= Swimming at the 2024 Summer Olympics – Women's 100-metre freestyle =

Women's 100-metre freestyle at the Games of the XXXIII Olympiad
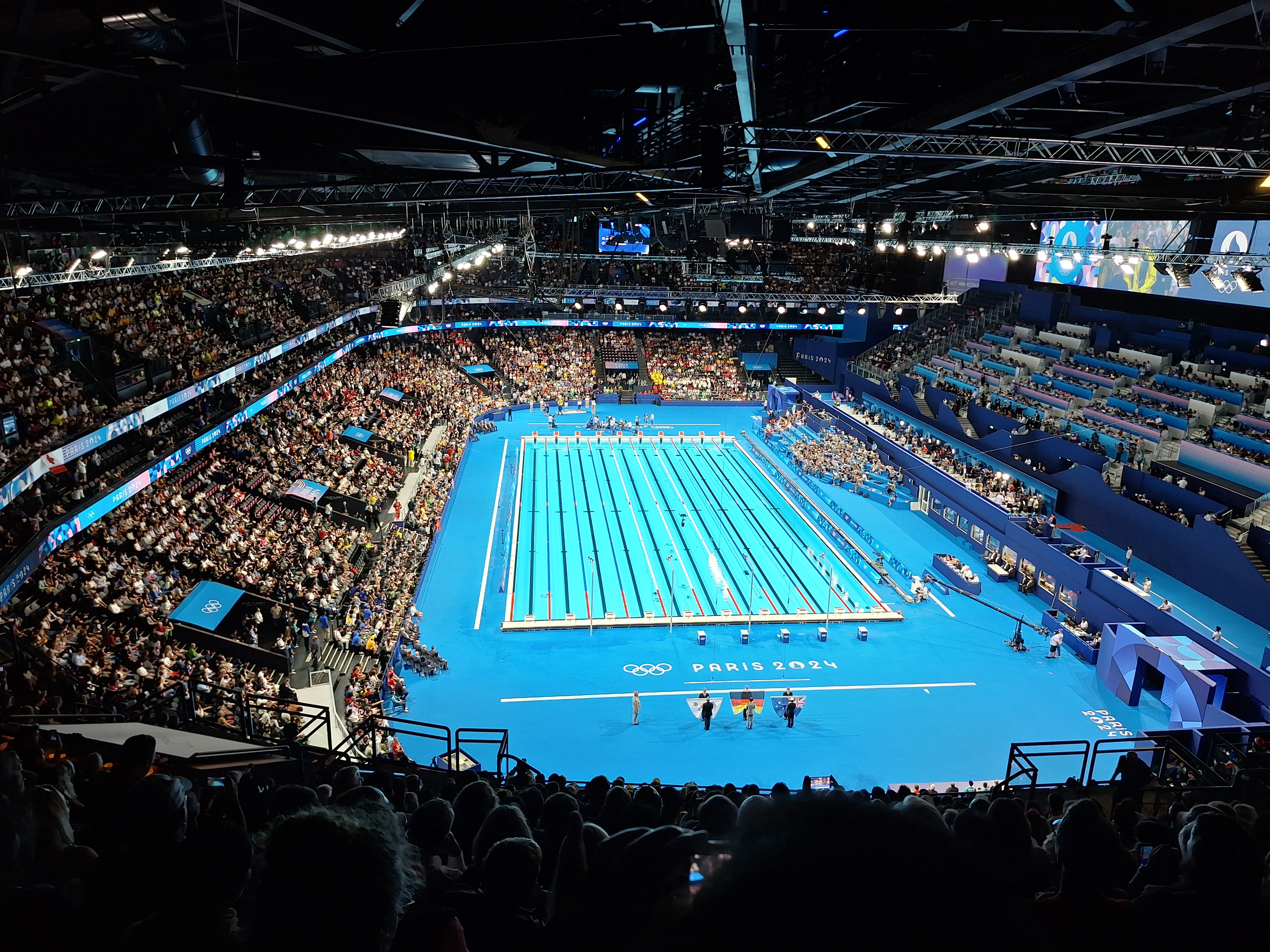
- Paris La Défense Arena after it was converted to a swimming pool for the swimming events
- Venue: Paris La Défense Arena
- Dates: 30 July 2024 (heats and semis); 31 July 2024 (final)
- Competitors: 29 from 24 nations
- Winning time: 52.16

Medalists
1st place, gold medalist(s)		Sarah Sjöström	Sweden
2nd place, silver medalist(s)		Torri Huske	United States
3rd place, bronze medalist(s)		Siobhán Haughey	Hong Kong

The women's 100-metre freestyle event at the 2024 Summer Olympics was held on 30 and 31 July 2024 at Paris La Défense Arena, which was converted to an Olympic 50m swimming pool for the swimming events.

Australian Mollie O'Callaghan was the favourite to win the event, though Hong Kong's Siobhán Haughey, the Netherlands' Marrit Steenbergen, Sweden's Sarah Sjöström and Australia's Shayna Jack were also in contention. All of those swimmers progressed through to the final.

In the final, Sjöström won gold with a time of 52.16, the US' Torri Huske swam 52.29 for silver and Haughey won bronze with 52.33—0.01 seconds ahead of O'Callaghan who finished fourth with 52.34. Sjöström's win made her the first person to win medals in this event at non-consecutive Olympics, and she was also more than four years older than the second-oldest competitor in the final. The Guardian called it an "exceptionally close race".

== Background ==
Australia's Mollie O'Callaghan won the event at the 2022 and 2023 World Championships, and had the second fastest qualifying time of 52.08. The fastest qualifying time belonged to Hong Kong's Siobhán Haughey who swam a time of 52.08 at the 2023 World Aquatics World Cup. Haughey was also the silver medallist at the 2020 Olympics, 2023 World Championships and 2024 World Championships. The Netherlands' Marrit Steenbergen won the event at the 2024 World Championships with the fourth fastest qualifying time of 52.26. Other contenders included Sweden's Sarah Sjöström and Australia's Shayna Jack, who swam the third and fifth fastest qualifying times, respectively, in relays at the 2023 World Championships. Sjöström initially planned not to swim the event, but changed her mind shortly before the event commenced.

The qualifying times of the top five qualifiers—Haughey, O'Callaghan, Sjöström, Steenbergen and Jack—were separated by 0.26 seconds. Olympic champion Emma McKeon failed to qualify for the event.

Both SwimSwam and Swimming World predicted O'Callaghan would win gold. SwimSwam predicted Sjöström would come second and Haughey would come third, while Swimming World predicted Haughey would come second and Steenbergen would come third.

The event was held at Paris La Défense Arena, which was converted to a swimming pool for the swimming events.

== Qualification ==
Each National Olympic Committee (NOC) was permitted to enter a maximum of two qualified athletes in each individual event, but only if both of them had attained the Olympic Qualifying Time (OQT). For this event, the OQT was 53.61 seconds. World Aquatics then considered athletes qualifying through universality; NOCs were given one event entry for each gender, which could be used by any athlete regardless of qualification time, providing the spaces had not already been taken by athletes from that nation who had achieved the OQT. Finally, the rest of the spaces were filled by athletes who had met the Olympic Consideration Time (OCT), which was 53.88 for this event. In total, 14 athletes qualified through achieving the OQT, 14 athletes qualified through universality places and one athlete qualified through achieving the OCT.

Top 10 fastest qualification times
Swimmer	Country	Time	Competition
Siobhán Haughey	Hong Kong	52.02	2023 World Aquatics World Cup
Mollie O'Callaghan	Australia	52.08	2023 World Aquatics Championships
Sarah Sjöström	Sweden	52.24	2023 World Aquatics Championships
Marrit Steenbergen	Netherlands	52.26	2024 World Aquatics Championships
Shayna Jack	Australia	52.28	2023 World Aquatics Championships
Yang Junxuan	China	52.68	2024 Chinese Championships
Torri Huske	United States	52.90	2024 United States Olympic Trials
Anna Hopkin	Great Britain	53.09	2024 World Aquatics Championships
Gretchen Walsh	United States	53.13	2024 United States Olympic Trials
Wu Qingfeng	China	53.25	2024 Chinese Championships

== Heats ==
Four heats (preliminary rounds) took place on 30 July 2024, starting at 12:47. (Note: All times are Central European Summer Time (UTC+2)) The swimmers with the best 16 times in the heats advanced to the semifinals. Sjöström swam the fastest qualifying time of 52.99, while Haughey, Steenbergen, O'Callaghan and Jack also all qualified. Kayla Sanchez of the Philippines swam a time of 53.67 to qualify in joint tenth and break her country's national record. Canada's Maggie Mac Neil qualified with the 16th fastest time, but withdrew from the event to focus on the relay events she was competing in.

Results
Rank	Heat	Lane	Swimmer	Nation	Time	Notes
1	2	4	Sarah Sjöström	Sweden	52.99	Q
2	4	4	Siobhán Haughey	Hong Kong	53.02	Q
3	2	5	Yang Junxuan	China	53.05	Q
4	4	5	Marrit Steenbergen	Netherlands	53.22	Q
5	3	4	Mollie O'Callaghan	Australia	53.27	Q
6	3	5	Shayna Jack	Australia	53.40	Q
7	4	3	Torri Huske	United States	53.53	Q
8	2	3	Gretchen Walsh	United States	53.54	Q
9	3	2	Béryl Gastaldello	France	53.65	Q
10	3	3	Anna Hopkin	Great Britain	53.67	Q
10	4	1	Kayla Sanchez	Philippines	53.67	Q, NR
12	4	2	Marie Wattel	France	53.70	Q
13	4	6	Wu Qingfeng	China	54.03	Q
14	3	6	Michelle Coleman	Sweden	54.10	Q
15	4	7	Neža Klančar	Slovenia	54.12	Q
16	2	2	Maggie Mac Neil	Canada	54.16	Q, WD
17	2	6	Barbora Seemanová	Czech Republic	54.66	Q
18	2	7	Kalia Antoniou	Cyprus	54.75	R
19	3	1	Snæfríður Jórunnardóttir	Iceland	54.85	
20	3	7	Kornelia Fiedkiewicz	Poland	55.25	
21	3	8	Jana Pavalić	Croatia	55.77	
22	4	8	Gloria Muzito	Uganda	55.95	NR
23	2	1	Jillian Crooks	Cayman Islands	56.15	
24	2	8	Nesrine Medjahed	Algeria	57.34	
25	1	4	Paige van der Westhuizen	Zimbabwe	58.19	
26	1	3	Tilly Collymore	Grenada	58.84	
27	1	5	Maxine Egner	Botswana	58.98	
28	1	6	Aleka Persaud	Guyana	1:01.29	
29	1	2	Rana Saadeldin	Sudan	1:04.72	

== Semifinals ==
Two semifinals took place on 30 July, starting at 21:33. The swimmers with the eight best times in the semifinals advanced to the final. Haughey won the first semifinal with the fastest qualifying time of 52.64, and Jack placed second to qualify with the second fastest time of 52.72. O'Callaghan won the second semifinal with the third fastest time of 52.75. China's Yang Junxuan qualified with the fourth fastest time, followed by Steenbergen, Sjöström, and then the US' Torri Huske and Gretchen Walsh. Slovenian Neža Klančar swam a time of 53.96, which tied the national record but did not qualify her for the final.

Results
Rank	Heat	Lane	Swimmer	Nation	Time	Notes
1	1	4	Siobhán Haughey	Hong Kong	52.64	Q
2	1	3	Shayna Jack	Australia	52.72	Q
3	2	3	Mollie O'Callaghan	Australia	52.75	Q
4	2	5	Yang Junxuan	China	52.81	Q
5	1	5	Marrit Steenbergen	Netherlands	52.86	Q
6	2	4	Sarah Sjöström	Sweden	52.87	Q
7	2	6	Torri Huske	United States	52.99	Q
8	1	6	Gretchen Walsh	United States	53.18	Q
9	2	1	Wu Qingfeng	China	53.34	
10	1	7	Marie Wattel	France	53.38	
11	1	2	Anna Hopkin	Great Britain	53.74	
12	1	1	Michelle Coleman	Sweden	53.75	
13	1	8	Barbora Seemanová	Czech Republic	53.94	
14	2	8	Neža Klančar	Slovenia	53.96	NR
15	2	7	Kayla Sanchez	Philippines	54.21	
16	2	2	Béryl Gastaldello	France	54.29	

== Final ==
The final took place at 20:30 on 31 July. Sjöström swam what SwimSwam called a "balanced race" to win gold with a time of 52.16, while Huske swam the fastest opening split and stayed ahead of everyone but Sjöström to win silver with 52.29. Haughey won bronze with 52.33—0.01 seconds ahead of O'Callaghan who finished fourth with 52.34. After the race, O'Callaghan said she "expected a lot more". The Guardian called the final an "exceptionally close race".

The gold was Sjöström's first Olympic medal in the event since 2016, when she won bronze at the Rio Olympics. This made her the first person to win medals in this event at non-consecutive Olympics, and she was also more than four years older than the second-oldest competitor in the final. It was Huske and Haughey's second Olympic medal of the games. Haughey became the first swimmer to medal in both the 100 metre freestyle and 200 metre freestyle events at consecutive Olympics, and it was her fourth Olympic medal—the most ever won by an athlete from Hong Kong.

Results
Rank	Lane	Swimmer	Nation	Time	Notes
1st place, gold medalist(s)	7	Sarah Sjöström	Sweden	52.16	
2nd place, silver medalist(s)	1	Torri Huske	United States	52.29	
3rd place, bronze medalist(s)	4	Siobhán Haughey	Hong Kong	52.33	
4	3	Mollie O'Callaghan	Australia	52.34	
5	5	Shayna Jack	Australia	52.72	
6	6	Yang Junxuan	China	52.82	
7	2	Marrit Steenbergen	Netherlands	52.83	
8	8	Gretchen Walsh	United States	53.04	

Statistics
Name	15 metre split (s)	50 metre split (s)	50–65 metre split (s)	Time (s)	Stroke rate (strokes/min)
Sarah Sjöström	6.18	25.26	7.56	52.16	51.6
Torri Huske	6.01	25.06	7.22	52.29	50.4
Siobhán Haughey	6.28	25.09	7.48	52.33	53.8
Mollie O'Callaghan	6.17	25.51	7.23	52.34	50.6
Shayna Jack	6.35	25.29	7.69	52.72	51.8
Yang Junxuan	6.36	25.51	7.85	52.82	54.0
Marrit Steenbergen	6.31	25.38	7.41	52.83	51.8
Gretchen Walsh	5.96	25.22	7.40	53.04	47.5
