= Swimming at the 2024 Summer Olympics – Women's 4 × 100-metre freestyle relay =

Women's 4 × 100-metre freestyle relay at the Games of the XXXIII Olympiad
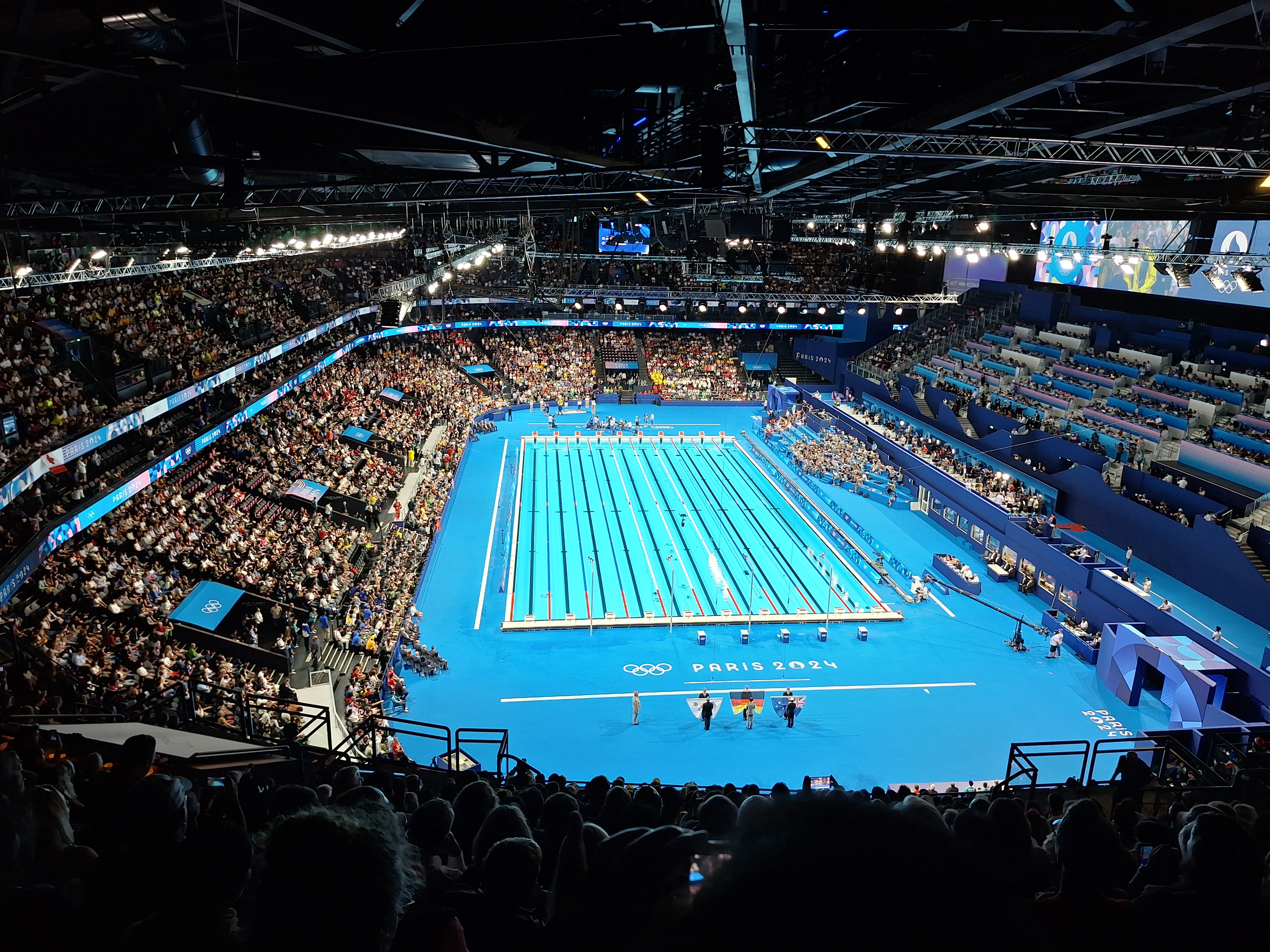
- Paris La Défense Arena after it was converted to a swimming pool for the swimming events
- Venue: Paris La Défense Arena
- Dates: 27 July 2024 (heats and final)
- Competitors: 73 from 16 nations
- Teams: 16 teams
- Winning time: 3:28.92 OR

Medalists
1st place, gold medalist(s)		Mollie O'Callaghan, Shayna Jack, Emma McKeon, Meg Harris, Olivia Wunsch*, Bronte Campbell*; Australia
2nd place, silver medalist(s)		Kate Douglass, Gretchen Walsh, Torri Huske, Simone Manuel, Abbey Weitzeil*, Erika Connolly*; United States
3rd place, bronze medalist(s)		Yang Junxuan, Cheng Yujie, Zhang Yufei, Wu Qingfeng, Yu Yiting*; China

The women's 4 × 100-metre freestyle relay event at the 2024 Summer Olympics was held on 27 July 2024 at Paris La Défense Arena, which was converted to a swimming pool for the swimming events.

Australia were the favourites to win the event, while the US, China and Canada were also in contention. All four teams progressed to the final.

In the final, Australia led from beginning to end to win with a new Olympic record of 3:28.92. The United States finished second with a new Americas record of 3:30.20 and China finished third with a new Asian record of 3:30.30. Australia's win gave them their fourth consecutive Olympic title in the event.

== Background ==
Australia won the event at the 2012, 2016 and 2020 Olympics, held the world record, and also won the event at the 2023 World Championships. Both SwimSwam and Swimming World opined that they would win, with SwimSwam calling them the "heavy favourite". Other contenders were the US, who Swimming World opined "could keep it close", China and Canada. SwimSwam and Swimming World both predicted the US would come second and China would take third.

The event was held at Paris La Défense Arena, which was converted to a swimming pool for the swimming events.

== Qualification ==
Each National Olympic Committee could enter one team, and there were a total of sixteen qualifications places available. The first three qualifying places were taken by the podium finishers at the 2023 World Championships, and the final thirteen qualifying places were allocated to the fastest performances at the 2023 and 2024 World Championships.

== Heats ==
Two heats (preliminary rounds) took place on 27 July 2024, starting at 12:15. (Note: All times are Central European Summer Time (UTC+2)) The teams with the best eight times in the heats advanced to the final. The United States won the first heat to qualify with the fastest time of 3:33.29, while Australia won the second heat to qualify with the fastest time of 3:31.57. China, Sweden, France, Canada, Great Britain and Italy also all qualified.

Results
Rank	Heat	Lane	Nation	Swimmers	Time	Notes
1	2	4	Australia	Olivia Wunsch (53.94); Bronte Campbell (53.46); Meg Harris (52.23); Emma McKeon (51.94)	3:31.57	Q
2	1	4	United States	Abbey Weitzeil (53.60); Simone Manuel (53.23); Erika Connolly (53.83); Kate Douglass (52.63)	3:33.29	Q
3	2	5	China	Cheng Yujie (53.95); Wu Qingfeng (53.84); Yu Yiting (54.05); Yang Junxuan (52.47)	3:34.31	Q
4	2	3	Sweden	Michelle Coleman (53.92); Sarah Sjöström (51.99); Sara Junevik (54.09); Sofia Åstedt (54.35)	3:34.35	Q
5	2	2	France	Béryl Gastaldello (53.54); Mary-Ambre Moluh (53.49); Lison Nowaczyk (54.67); Charlotte Bonnet (53.55)	3:35.25	Q
6	2	6	Canada	Penny Oleksiak (53.78); Mary-Sophie Harvey (54.15); Brooklyn Douthwright (53.81); Taylor Ruck (53.55)	3:35.29	Q
7	1	5	Great Britain	Anna Hopkin (54.08); Eva Okaro (53.84); Lucy Hope (54.74); Freya Anderson (53.47)	3:36.13	Q
8	1	6	Italy	Sofia Morini (53.92); Chiara Tarantino (54.14); Sara Curtis (53.93); Emma Virginia Menicucci (54.29)	3:36.28	Q
9	1	3	Netherlands	Tessa Giele (55.24); Kim Busch (54.86); Sam van Nunen (54.26); Marrit Steenbergen (52.42)	3:36.78	
10	2	1	Hungary	Petra Senánszky (54.91); Lilla Minna Ábrahám (54.36); Panna Ugrai (54.25); Nikolett Pádár (53.81)	3:37.33	
11	1	1	Denmark	Signe Bro (55.45); Julie Kepp Jensen (54.52); Elisabeth Sabroe Ebbesen (55.10); Martine Damborg (54.45)	3:39.52	
12	2	7	Brazil	Ana Carolina Vieira (54.81); Stephanie Balduccini (53.83); Giovana Reis (55.73); Maria Paula Heitmann (56.23)	3:40.60	
13	1	2	Poland	Katarzyna Wasick (54.71); Kornelia Fiedkiewicz (54.82); Julia Maik (55.57); Zuzanna Famulok (55.57)	3:40.67	
14	2	8	Slovenia	Neža Klančar (54.29); Janja Šegel (55.22); Katja Fain (55.43); Tjaša Pintar (56.35)	3:41.29	
15	1	7	Hong Kong	Natalie Kan (56.91); Tam Hoi Lam (55.01); Camille Cheng (55.12); Stephanie Au (55.38)	3:42.42	
16	1	8	Ireland	Danielle Hill (55.61); Grace Davison (55.44); Erin Riordan (55.95); Victoria Catterson (55.67)	3:42.67	

== Final ==
The final took place at 21:34 on 27 July. Australia led from beginning to end to win with a new Olympic record of 3:28.92, which broke their record of 3:29.69 set at the previous Olympics in Tokyo. The United States finished second with a new Americas record of 3:30.20, 0.10 seconds ahead of China, who finished third with a new Asian record of 3:30.30. Canada finished fourth with 3:32.99 and Sweden finished fifth with a new national record of 3:33.79.

Australia's win gave them their fourth consecutive Olympic win in the event, and Yang Junxuan's opening swim for China set a new national record of 52.48 in the individual version of the event.

Results
Rank	Lane	Nation	Swimmers	Time	Notes
1st place, gold medalist(s)	4	Australia	Mollie O'Callaghan (52.24); Shayna Jack (52.35); Emma McKeon (52.39); Meg Harris (51.94)	3:28.92	OR
2nd place, silver medalist(s)	5	United States	Kate Douglass (52.98); Gretchen Walsh (52.55); Torri Huske (52.06); Simone Manuel (52.61)	3:30.20	AM
3rd place, bronze medalist(s)	3	China	Yang Junxuan (52.48 NR); Cheng Yujie (52.76); Zhang Yufei (52.75); Wu Qingfeng (52.31)	3:30.30	AS
4	7	Canada	Maggie Mac Neil (53.31); Taylor Ruck (53.20); Summer McIntosh (53.22); Penny Oleksiak (53.26)	3:32.99	
5	6	Sweden	Sarah Sjöström (52.53); Michelle Coleman (52.98); Sara Junevik (54.41); Louise Hansson (53.87)	3:33.79	NR
6	2	France	Béryl Gastaldello (53.83); Charlotte Bonnet (54.14); Mary-Ambre Moluh (53.37); Marie Wattel (53.65)	3:34.99	
7	1	Great Britain	Anna Hopkin (53.31); Eva Okaro (53.75); Lucy Hope (54.95); Freya Anderson (53.24)	3:35.25	
8	8	Italy	Sofia Morini (54.16); Chiara Tarantino (54.27); Sara Curtis (54.24); Emma Virginia Menicucci (53.84)	3:36.51	
