= Madison Wilson =

Australian swimmer (born 1994)

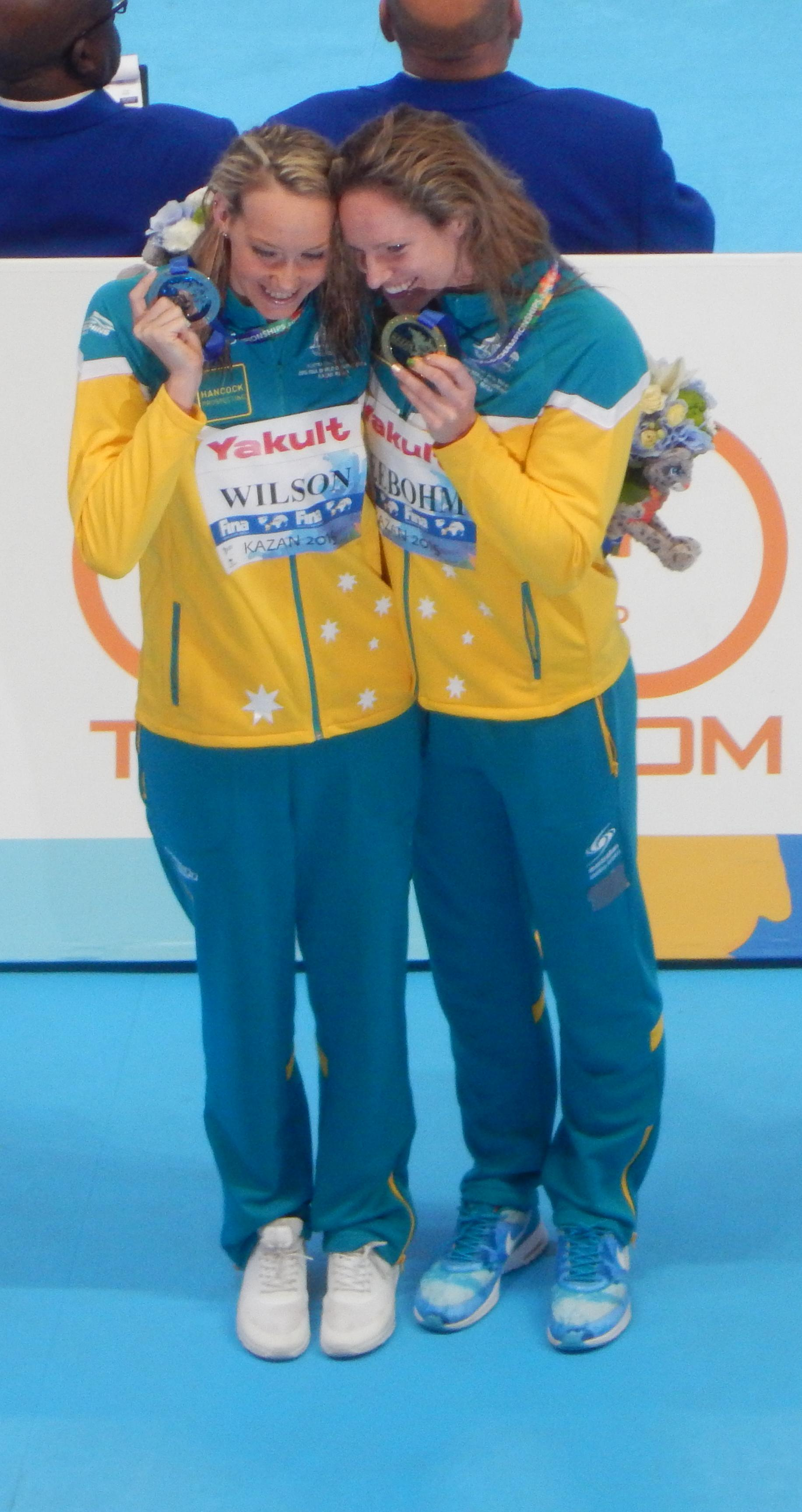
- Emily Seebohm with Wilson (left) in Kazan, 2015

Personal information
- Nickname: Madi
- National team: Australia
- Born: Madison Maree Wilson; 31 May 1994 (age 32) Roma, Queensland, Australia
- Height: 1.79 m (5 ft 10 in)
- Weight: 61 kg (134 lb)

Sport
- Sport: Swimming
- Strokes: Backstroke, freestyle
- Club: Marion
- Coach: Peter Bishop
Medal record
Women's swimming
Representing Australia
Event	1st	2nd	3rd
Olympic Games	2	1	1
World Championships (LC)	8	7	2
World Championships (SC)	3	3	1
Commonwealth Games	4	0	1
Youth Olympic Games	1	1	1
Universiade	1	0	2
Total	19	12	8
Olympic Games
Gold medal – first place	2016 Rio de Janeiro	4×100 m freestyle
Gold medal – first place	2020 Tokyo	4×100 m freestyle
Silver medal – second place	2016 Rio de Janeiro	4×100 m medley
Bronze medal – third place	2020 Tokyo	4×200 m freestyle
World Championships (LC)
Gold medal – first place	2015 Kazan	4×100 m freestyle
Gold medal – first place	2019 Gwangju	4×100 m freestyle
Gold medal – first place	2019 Gwangju	4×200 m freestyle
Gold medal – first place	2022 Budapest	4×100 m freestyle
Gold medal – first place	2022 Budapest	4×100 m mixed freestyle
Gold medal – first place	2023 Fukuoka	4×100 m freestyle
Gold medal – first place	2023 Fukuoka	4×200 m freestyle
Gold medal – first place	2023 Fukuoka	4×100 m mixed freestyle
Silver medal – second place	2015 Kazan	100 m backstroke
Silver medal – second place	2017 Budapest	4×100 m freestyle
Silver medal – second place	2019 Gwangju	4×100 m medley
Silver medal – second place	2019 Gwangju	4×100 m mixed freestyle
Silver medal – second place	2022 Budapest	4×200 m freestyle
Silver medal – second place	2022 Budapest	4×100 m medley
Silver medal – second place	2023 Fukuoka	4×100 m medley
Bronze medal – third place	2015 Kazan	4×100 m medley
Bronze medal – third place	2017 Budapest	4×200 m freestyle
World Championships (SC)
Gold medal – first place	2022 Melbourne	4×100 m freestyle
Gold medal – first place	2022 Melbourne	4×200 m freestyle
Gold medal – first place	2022 Melbourne	4×50 m medley
Silver medal – second place	2014 Doha	4×100 m medley
Silver medal – second place	2022 Melbourne	4×50 m freestyle
Silver medal – second place	2022 Melbourne	4×50 m mixed freestyle
Bronze medal – third place	2014 Doha	4×200 m freestyle
Commonwealth Games
Gold medal – first place	2022 Birmingham	4×100 m freestyle
Gold medal – first place	2022 Birmingham	4×200 m freestyle
Gold medal – first place	2022 Birmingham	4×100 m mixed freestyle
Gold medal – first place	2022 Birmingham	4×100 m mixed medley
Bronze medal – third place	2022 Birmingham	200 m freestyle
Universiade
Gold medal – first place	2013 Kazan	200 m backstroke
Bronze medal – third place	2013 Kazan	100 m backstroke
Bronze medal – third place	2013 Kazan	50 m backstroke
Junior Pan Pacific Championships
Bronze medal – third place	2012 Honolulu	100 m backstroke
Youth Olympic Games
Gold medal – first place	2010 Singapore	4×100 metre medley
Silver medal – second place	2010 Singapore	4×100m mixed freestyle
Bronze medal – third place	2010 Singapore	4×100m mixed medley

Madison Maree Short, OAM (née Wilson; born 31 May 1994) is a former Australian competitive swimmer who has participated in backstroke and freestyle events at the Olympic Games and the FINA world championships. Wilson has been a member of six world record Australian relay teams, most recently at the 2022 Short Course World Championships.

== Early and personal life ==
Although born in the South West Queensland town of Roma, Wilson grew up in Yeppoon on the Capricorn Coast where she attended Sacred Heart Catholic Primary School and swam with local swimming club Yeppoon Sharks where she was selected in her first Queensland team.

Wilson is married to Australian cricketer Matthew Short. The couple have a son, Austin Wilson Short.

== Swimming career ==
Wilson won two medals as a member of Australian relay teams at the 2014 FINA World Swimming Championships (25 m) in Doha, Qatar: a silver in the women's 4×100-metre medley relay, and a bronze in the women's 4×200-metre freestyle relay.

At the 2015 World Aquatics Championships in Kazan, Russia, Wilson won three medals: a gold as a member of the winning Australian team in the women's 4×100-metre freestyle relay; a silver in the women's 100-metre backstroke; and a bronze in the women's 4×100-metre medley relay.

At the 2016 Summer Olympics, Wilson represented Australia in the 100 m backstroke, where she finished 8th in the final. However, as a heat swimmer for the 4x100metre freestyle and medley relay teams, she received a gold and a silver medal after the teams placed first and second in their respective finals.

In recognition of her success at the 2016 Summer Olympics, Wilson was awarded a Medal of the Order of Australia in the 2017 Australia Day Honours.

Wilson again swam in the heats of the women's 4x100metre freestyle event at the 2020 Summer Olympics alongside Mollie O'Callaghan, Bronte Campbell and Meg Harris in July 2021, with the team posting the fastest qualifying time of 03:31:73. However, Wilson and O'Callaghan did not swim in the final with Emma McKeon and Cate Campbell selected to compete instead, taking the Australian relay team to victory. As heat swimmers, Wilson and O'Callaghan are still Olympic gold medal recipients.

== World records ==
=== Long course metres ===
No.	Event	Time	Meet	Location	Date	Status	Ref
1	4x200 m freestyle relay^{[a]}	7:41.50	2019 World Aquatic Championships	Gwangju, South Korea	25 July 2019	Former	
2	4x100 m mixed freestyle relay^{[b]}	3:19.38	2022 World Aquatics Championships	Budapest, Hungary	24 June 2022	Former	
3	4x200 m freestyle relay (2)^{[c]}	7:39.29	2022 Commonwealth Games	Birmingham, United Kingdom	31 July 2022	Former	

^{a} split 1:56.73 (2nd leg); with Ariarne Titmus (1st leg), Brianna Throssell (3rd leg), Emma McKeon (4th leg)
^{b} split 52.25 (3rd leg); with Jack Cartwright (1st leg), Kyle Chalmers (2nd leg), Mollie O'Callaghan (4th leg)
^{c} split 1:56.27 (1st leg); with Kiah Melverton (2nd leg), Mollie O'Callaghan (3rd leg), Ariarne Titmus (4th leg)

=== Short course metres ===
No.	Event	Time	Meet	Location	Date	Status	Ref
1	4x100 m freestyle relay^{[a]}	3:25.43	2022 World Championships (25 m)	Melbourne, Australia	13 December 2022	Former	
2	4x200 m freestyle relay^{[b]}	7:30.87	2022 World Championships (25 m)	Melbourne, Australia	14 December 2022	Former	
3	4x50 m medley relay^{[c]}	1:42.35	2022 World Championships (25 m)	Melbourne, Australia	17 December 2022	Current	

^{a} split 51.28 (2nd leg); with Mollie O'Callaghan (1st leg), Meg Harris (3rd leg), Emma McKeon (4th leg)
^{b} split 1:53.13 (1st leg), with Mollie O'Callaghan (2nd leg), Leah Neale (3rd leg), Lani Pallister (4th leg)
^{c} split 23.32 (freestyle leg); with Mollie O'Callaghan (backstroke leg), Chelsea Hodges (breaststroke leg), Emma McKeon (butterfly leg)

== Olympic records ==
=== Long course metres ===
No.	Event	Time		Meet	Location	Date	Status	Notes	Ref
1	4x100 m freestyle relay^{[a]}	3:32.39	h	2016 Summer Olympics	Rio de Janeiro, Brazil	6 August 2016	Former		

Legend: WR – World record; OC – Oceanian record; NR – Australian record; e – equalled existing record;
Records not set in finals: h – heat; sf – semifinal; r – relay 1st leg; rh – relay heat 1st leg; b – B final; † – en route to final mark; so – swim-off; tt – time trial

^{a} split 54.11 (1st leg); with Brittany Elmslie (2nd leg), Bronte Campbell (3rd leg), Cate Campbell (4th leg)

== See also ==
- List of Olympic medalists in swimming (women)
- List of Youth Olympic Games gold medalists who won Olympic gold medals
