= 2022 FINA World Swimming Championships (25 m) – Women's 50 metre freestyle =

Swimming competition

Women's 50 metre freestyle at the 2022 FINA World Swimming Championships (25 m)
- Venue: Melbourne Sports and Aquatic Centre
- Location: Melbourne, Australia
- Dates: 16 December (heats and semifinals); 17 December (final)
- Competitors: 58 from 54 nations
- Winning time: 23.04 CR

Medalists
gold medal	Emma McKeon	Australia
silver medal	Katarzyna Wasick	Poland
bronze medal	Anna Hopkin	Great Britain

The Women's 50 metre freestyle competition of the 2022 FINA World Swimming Championships (25 m) was held on 16 and 17 December 2022.

== Records ==
Prior to the competition, the existing world and championship records were as follows.

World record	Ranomi Kromowidjojo (NED)	22.93	Berlin, Germany	7 August 2017
Competition record	Sarah Sjöström (SWE)	23.08	Abu Dhabi, United Arab Emirates	21 December 2021

The following new records were set during this competition:

Date	Event	Name	Nationality	Time	Record
17 December	Final	Emma McKeon	Australia	23.04	CR

== Results ==
=== Heats ===
The heats were started on 16 December at 11:58.

Rank	Heat	Lane	Name	Nationality	Time	Notes
1	8	4	Katarzyna Wasick	Poland	23.74	Q
2	6	5	Meg Harris	Australia	23.77	Q
3	8	2	Julie Kepp Jensen	Denmark	23.79	Q
4	7	3	Anna Hopkin	Great Britain	23.86	Q
4	7	6	Melanie Henique	France	23.86	Q
6	7	4	Emma McKeon	Australia	23.93	Q
7	7	5	Michelle Coleman	Sweden	23.94	Q
8	6	6	Erika Brown	United States	23.98	Q
9	8	8	Neža Klančar	Slovenia	24.16	Q, NR
10	6	4	Claire Curzan	United States	24.17	Q
11	8	7	Barbora Seemanová	Czech Republic	24.24	Q
12	6	3	Valerie van Roon	Netherlands	24.33	Q
12	8	3	Wu Qingfeng	China	24.33	Q
14	7	2	Kim Busch	Netherlands	24.37	Q
15	6	1	Rebecca Moynihan	New Zealand	24.59	Q
16	5	4	Caitlin de Lange	South Africa	24.67	Q
17	8	1	Jenjira Srisa-Ard	Thailand	24.69	NR
18	7	7	Yume Jinno	Japan	24.74	
19	6	2	Isabella Hindley	Great Britain	24.86	
20	5	2	Anna Hadjiloizou	Cyprus	24.93	
20	5	5	Andrea Berrino	Argentina	24.93	
20	6	7	Lillian Slušná	Slovakia	24.93	
23	7	1	Diana Petkova	Bulgaria	24.96	
24	5	1	Hur Yeon-kyung	South Korea	24.99	
25	4	3	Huang Mei-chien	Chinese Taipei	25.07	NR
26	4	4	Amel Melih	Algeria	25.09	NR
27	6	8	Sirena Rowe	Colombia	25.19	
28	7	8	Stephanie Balduccini	Brazil	25.24	
29	5	6	Rafaela Fernandini	Peru	25.36	
30	5	3	Chan Kin Lok	Hong Kong	25.61	
31	4	6	Elisabeth Timmer	Aruba	25.64	NR
32	5	7	Jasmine Alkhaldi	Philippines	25.69	
33	5	8	Karen Torrez	Bolivia	26.09	
34	4	5	Kirabo Namutebi	Uganda	26.15	
35	4	7	Rhaniska Gibbs	Bahamas	26.16	
36	4	1	Aleka Persaud	Guyana	26.42	
36	4	2	Marie Khoury	Lebanon	26.42	
38	3	4	Hana Beiqi	Kosovo	26.84	
39	4	8	Nomvula Mjimba	Zimbabwe	27.15	
40	3	5	Kaiya Brown	Samoa	27.43	
41	3	2	Sophia Latiff	Tanzania	27.63	
42	2	1	Cassandre Zenon	Cameroon	27.87	
43	3	6	Noelani Day	Tonga	28.18	
44	1	5	Rachel Sanders	Gibraltar	28.73	
45	1	4	Taeyanna Adams	Federated States of Micronesia	28.84	
45	2	6	Jhnayali Tokome-Garap	Papua New Guinea	28.84	
47	2	4	Anushiya Tandukar	Nepal	28.92	
48	2	5	Saba Sultan	Kuwait	29.04	
49	3	1	Ammara Pinto	Malawi	29.71	
50	1	7	Sonia Aktar	Bangladesh	29.75	
51	3	7	Abbi Illis	Sint Maarten	29.77	
52	1	6	Mashael Al-Ayed	Saudi Arabia	29.87	
53	3	8	Kayla Hepler	Marshall Islands	30.31	
54	2	3	Hamna Ahmed	Maldives	30.35	
55	2	8	Ungilreng Ruluked	Palau	32.04	
56	2	2	Imelda Ximenes Belo	Timor-Leste	32.95	
57	2	7	Marie Amenou	Togo	34.70	
58	1	1	Mary Yongai	Sierra Leone	41.41	
	1	2	Mahra Al-Shehhi	United Arab Emirates	Did not start	
	1	3	Vanessa Bobimbo	Republic of the Congo	Did not start	
	3	3	Rosemarie Rova	Fiji	Did not start	
	8	5	Zhang Yufei	China	Did not start	
	8	6	Silvia Di Pietro	Italy	Did not start	

=== Semifinals ===
The semifinals were started on 16 December at 20:25.

Rank	Heat	Lane	Name	Nationality	Time	Notes
1	2	4	Katarzyna Wasick	Poland	23.37	Q
2	1	3	Emma McKeon	Australia	23.51	Q
3	2	6	Michelle Coleman	Sweden	23.77	Q
4	1	5	Anna Hopkin	Great Britain	23.79	Q
5	2	5	Julie Kepp Jensen	Denmark	23.93	Q
6	1	4	Meg Harris	Australia	23.97	Q
7	1	6	Erika Brown	United States	24.00	Q
7	2	3	Mélanie Henique	France	24.00	Q
9	2	2	Neža Klančar	Slovenia	24.13	NR
10	1	7	Valerie van Roon	Netherlands	24.19	
11	2	1	Wu Qingfeng	China	24.21	
12	1	2	Claire Curzan	United States	24.22	
13	2	7	Barbora Seemanová	Czech Republic	24.25	
14	1	1	Kim Busch	Netherlands	24.34	
15	1	8	Caitlin de Lange	South Africa	24.53	
16	2	8	Rebecca Moynihan	New Zealand	24.67	

=== Final ===
The final was held on 17 December at 21:33.

Rank	Lane	Name	Nationality	Time	Notes
1st place, gold medalist(s)	5	Emma McKeon	Australia	23.04	CR, OC
2nd place, silver medalist(s)	4	Katarzyna Wasick	Poland	23.55	
3rd place, bronze medalist(s)	6	Anna Hopkin	Great Britain	23.68	
4	2	Julie Kepp Jensen	Denmark	23.71	
5	3	Michelle Coleman	Sweden	23.72	
6	7	Meg Harris	Australia	23.73	
7	1	Erika Brown	United States	23.76	
8	8	Mélanie Henique	France	23.90	
