= Swimming at the 2022 Commonwealth Games – Women's 4 × 100 metre freestyle relay =

Women's 4 × 100 metre freestyle relay at the 2022 Commonwealth Games
- Venue: Sandwell Aquatics Centre
- Dates: 30 July
- Competitors: 28 from 7 nations
- Winning time: 3:30.64

Medalists
gold medal	Madison Wilson; Shayna Jack; Mollie O'Callaghan; Emma McKeon	Australia
silver medal	Anna Hopkin; Abbie Wood; Isabella Hindley; Freya Anderson	England
bronze medal	Summer McIntosh; Katerine Savard; Rebecca Smith; Maggie Mac Neil	Canada

The women's 4 × 100 metre freestyle relay event at the 2022 Commonwealth Games was held on 30 July at the Sandwell Aquatics Centre.

== Records ==
Prior to this competition, the existing world, Commonwealth and Games records were as follows:

World record	Australia (AUS); Bronte Campbell; Meg Harris; Emma McKeon; Cate Campbell	3:29.69	Tokyo, Japan	25 July 2021
Commonwealth record	Australia (AUS); Bronte Campbell; Meg Harris; Emma McKeon; Cate Campbell	3:29.69	Tokyo, Japan	25 July 2021
Games record	Australia; Shayna Jack; Bronte Campbell; Emma McKeon; Cate Campbell	3:30.05	Gold Coast, Australia	5 April 2018

== Schedule ==
The schedule is as follows:

All times are British Summer Time (UTC+1)

Date	Time	Round
Saturday 30 July 2022	21:26	Final

== Results ==
=== Final ===
Rank	Lane	Nation	Swimmers	Time	Notes
1st place, gold medalist(s)	4	Australia	Madison Wilson (53.22); Shayna Jack (52.72); Mollie O'Callaghan (52.66); Emma McKeon (52.04)	3:30.64	
2nd place, silver medalist(s)	3	England	Anna Hopkin (53.81); Abbie Wood (54.28); Isabella Hindley (55.10); Freya Anderson (53.43)	3:36.62	
3rd place, bronze medalist(s)	5	Canada	Summer McIntosh (54.62); Katerine Savard (54.44); Rebecca Smith (55.08); Maggie Mac Neil (53.11)	3:37.25	
4	7	South Africa	Aimee Canny (54.84); Emma Chelius (55.14); Olivia Nel (55.60); Erin Gallagher (54.73)	3:40.31	
5	2	Scotland	Lucy Hope (55.24); Emma Russell (55.45); Tain Bruce (55.20); Evie Davis (55.49)	3:41.38	NR
6	6	Northern Ireland	Victoria Catterson (55.21); Grace Davison (57.66); Mollie McAlorum (58.58); Danielle Hill (55.79)	3:47.24	
7	1	Guernsey	Laura le Cras (1:00.96); Molly Staples (1:00.41); Tatiana Tostevin (59.34); Orla Rabey (58.46)	3:59.17	
