= Shayna Jack =

Australian swimmer (born 1998)

Shayna Jack OAM
Personal information
- Nationality: Australian
- Born: 6 November 1998 (age 28) Brisbane, Australia
- Height: 1.80 m (5 ft 11 in)

Sport
- Sport: Swimming
- Strokes: Freestyle
- Coach: Dean Boxall
Medal record
Women's swimming
Representing Australia
Event	1st	2nd	3rd
Olympic Games	2	0	0
World Championships (LC)	5	8	4
Oceania Championships	3	0	2
Pan Pacific Championships	1	0	0
Commonwealth Games	4	1	3
Total	15	9	9
Olympic Games
Gold medal – first place	2024 Paris	4×100 m freestyle
Gold medal – first place	2024 Paris	4×200 m freestyle
World Championships (LC)
Gold medal – first place	2022 Budapest	4×100 m freestyle
Gold medal – first place	2023 Fukuoka	4×100 m freestyle
Gold medal – first place	2023 Fukuoka	4×200 m freestyle
Gold medal – first place	2023 Fukuoka	4×100 m mixed freestyle
Gold medal – first place	2024 Doha	4×100 m medley
Silver medal – second place	2017 Budapest	4×100 m freestyle
Silver medal – second place	2017 Budapest	4×100 m mixed medley
Silver medal – second place	2022 Budapest	4×100 m mixed medley
Silver medal – second place	2023 Fukuoka	50 m freestyle
Silver medal – second place	2023 Fukuoka	4×100 m mixed medley
Silver medal – second place	2024 Doha	4×100 m freestyle
Silver medal – second place	2024 Doha	4×100 m mixed freestyle
Silver medal – second place	2024 Doha	4×100 m mixed medley
Bronze medal – third place	2017 Budapest	4×200 m freestyle
Bronze medal – third place	2017 Budapest	4×100 m medley
Bronze medal – third place	2024 Doha	100 m freestyle
Bronze medal – third place	2024 Doha	4×200 m freestyle
Oceania Championships
Gold medal – first place	2014 Auckland	4×100 m freestyle
Gold medal – first place	2014 Auckland	4×200 m freestyle
Gold medal – first place	2014 Auckland	4×100 m mixed freestyle
Bronze medal – third place	2014 Auckland	200 m freestyle
Bronze medal – third place	2014 Auckland	4×100 m medley
Pan Pacific Championships
Gold medal – first place	2018 Tokyo	4×100 m freestyle
Commonwealth Games
Gold medal – first place	2018 Gold Coast	4×100 m freestyle
Gold medal – first place	2022 Birmingham	4×100 m freestyle
Gold medal – first place	2026 Glasgow	4×100 m freestyle
Gold medal – first place	2026 Glasgow	4×100 m mixed freestyle
Silver medal – second place	2022 Birmingham	100 m freestyle
Bronze medal – third place	2022 Birmingham	50 m freestyle
Bronze medal – third place	2026 Glasgow	50 m freestyle
Bronze medal – third place	2026 Glasgow	100 m freestyle
World Junior Championships
Gold medal – first place	2013 Dubai	4×100 m mixed freestyle
Gold medal – first place	2015 Singapore	4×100 m freestyle
Gold medal – first place	2015 Singapore	4×200 m freestyle
Silver medal – second place	2013 Dubai	4×100 m freestyle
Silver medal – second place	2013 Dubai	4×200 m freestyle
Silver medal – second place	2015 Singapore	4×100 m medley
Silver medal – second place	2015 Singapore	4×100 m mixed freestyle
Bronze medal – third place	2013 Dubai	100 m freestyle
Bronze medal – third place	2015 Singapore	50 m freestyle
Junior Pan Pacific Championships
Gold medal – first place	2014 Maui	100 m freestyle
Gold medal – first place	2014 Maui	4×100 m freestyle
Silver medal – second place	2014 Maui	200 m freestyle
Silver medal – second place	2014 Maui	4×200 m freestyle

Shayna Louise Jack (born 6 November 1998) is a retired Australian swimmer. She won gold medals in Women's 4 × 100 metre freestyle relay and Women's 4 × 200 metre freestyle relay at the 2024 Paris Olympics.

From 2019 to 2021, Jack served a 24-month competition ban for an anti-doping rule violation relating to unintentional use of Ligandrol.

== Early life ==
Jack was born in Brisbane. She started swimming at the age of 18 months, after her parents thought it would be helpful to teach her and her siblings how to be safe in water. She grew to enjoy the experience and at age 10, told her parents she wanted to be an Olympian.

== Career ==
=== 2014: Double Junior Pan Pacific champion at 15 years of age ===
At the 2014 Junior Pan Pacific Swimming Championships, held in August in Kihei, United States, 15-year-old Jack won a gold medal in the 4×100 meter freestyle relay with a Championships record time of 3:39.73, the gold medal in the 100 meter freestyle with a 54.82, the silver medal in the 200 meter freestyle with a 1:59.48, a silver medal in the 4×200 meter freestyle relay, and placed fifth in the 50 meter freestyle.

=== 2019–2021: Positive doping test and suspension ===
Jack pulled out of the 2019 World Aquatics Championships days before it started, citing "personal reasons". It was later revealed that Jack had tested positive for the anabolic agent ligandrol, which is popular with bodybuilders, during an out-of-competition test held by the Australian Sports Anti-Doping Authority (ASADA); a follow-up sample further confirmed the banned substance in her system, and she was subsequently suspended by Swimming Australia and investigated by ASADA. She posted on Instagram saying that she "would never intentionally take a banned substance that would disrespect my sport and jeopardise my career". The investigation by ASADA was ongoing as of 29 July 2019.

The result of the investigation was unintentional ingestion of ligandrol by Jack and a 24-month suspension by the Court of Arbitration for Sport running from 12 July 2019 through 11 July 2021 for the anti-doping rule violation. In September 2021, after Jack served the entirety of the imposed suspension, the Court of Arbitration for Sport upheld the suspension as served in full when challenged by Sport Integrity Australia and that Jack could return to competition.

=== 2022: Return to competition ===
==== 2022 Australian Swimming Championships ====
In May, at the 2022 Australian Swimming Championships, held in Adelaide, Jack achieved 2022 World Aquatics Championships and 2022 Commonwealth Games qualifying times in two individual events, winning the 50 metre freestyle with a time of 24.14 seconds, and placing second in the 100 metre freestyle behind Mollie O'Callaghan with a time of 52.60 seconds.

==== 2022 World Aquatics Championships ====
At the 2022 World Aquatics Championships, with swimming competition contested at Danube Arena in Budapest, Hungary in June, Jack won her first medal of the championships in the 4×100 metre freestyle relay, splitting a 52.65 for the fourth leg of the relay to help win the gold medal in a final time of 3:30.95. She won her second and final medal three days later in the 4×100 metre mixed medley relay, swimming the freestyle portion of the finals relay in 52.92 seconds to contribute to the silver medal-winning time of 3:41.34 along with finals relay teammates Kaylee McKeown (backstroke), Zac Stubblety-Cook (breaststroke), and Matthew Temple (butterfly).

==== 2022 Commonwealth Games ====
In the 4×100 metre freestyle relay at the 2022 Commonwealth Games, held in Birmingham, England, Jack helped win the gold medal in a time of 3:30.64 by splitting a 52.72 for the second leg of the relay in the final. For the 50 metre freestyle, she swam a time of 24.36 seconds in the final to win the bronze medal, securing the final podium spot by finishing 0.42 seconds ahead of fourth-place finisher Emma Chelius of South Africa. In the 100 metre freestyle, she finished 0.25 seconds behind gold medalist Mollie O'Callaghan with a time of 52.88 seconds to win the silver medal. On 10 August, following her medal-winning performances at the 2022 Commonwealth Games, Jack was named to the 2022 Duel in the Pool roster for Team Australia.

=== 2023: Australian Swimming Championships ===
At the 2023 Australian Swimming Championships, in Gold Coast, Queensland, Jack won the silver medal in the 100-metre freestyle with a 2023 World Aquatics Championships qualifying time of 52.64 seconds, finishing 0.01 seconds behind gold medalist Mollie O'Callaghan and 0.58 seconds ahead of the next-fastest competitor. On the second day, she won the gold medal in the 50 metre freestyle with a World Championships qualifying time of 24.45 seconds. On the fourth of four days, she won the bronze medal in the 200 metre freestyle with a 1:55.37.

Two months later, Jack won the B Final of the 200-metre freestyle at the 2023 Australian Swimming Trials with a time of 1:56.82.

=== 2024: Paris Olympics ===
Jack qualified for four events at the 2024 Paris Olympics. She won gold medals in the Women's 4 × 100 metre freestyle relay and Women's 4 × 200 metre freestyle relay. Individually, she finished 8th in the 50 m freestyle and 5th in the 100 m freestyle.

=== 2026: Final year ===
In June 2026, she was selected to represent Australia at the 2026 Commonwealth Games. On 14 July 2026, Jack announced that she will retire from competitive swimming upon the conclusion of the Commonwealth Games. During the Commonwealth Games she won gold medals in the 4 × 100 metre freestyle relay and 4 × 100 metre mixed freestyle relay. She also won a bronze medal in the 100 metre freestyle.

== Television appearances ==
In 2020, Jack participated on Seven Network's reality program SAS Australia.

In 2025, she participated on Network 10's reality series I'm a Celebrity...Get Me Out of Here! for its 11th season.

== Personal life ==
Jack is engaged to Australian field hockey player Joel Rintala. She was awarded a Medal of the Order of Australia in 2025 for her service to sport as a gold medallist at the 2024 Paris Olympic Games.

Jack's younger brother, Jamie, is also a swimmer.

== World records ==
=== Long course metres ===
No.	Event	Time	Meet	Location	Date	Status	Ref
1	4x100 m freestyle relay^{[a]}	3:30.05	2018 Commonwealth Games	Gold Coast, Queensland	5 April 2018	Former	
2	4×100 m freestyle relay^{[b]}	3:27.96	2023 World Aquatics Championships	Fukuoka, Japan	23 July 2023	Current	
3	4x200 m freestyle relay^{[c]}	7:37.50	2023 World Aquatics Championships	Fukuoka, Japan	27 July 2023	Current	
4	4x100 m mixed freestyle relay^{[d]}	3:18.83	2023 World Aquatics Championships	Fukuoka, Japan	29 July 2023	Former	

^{a} split 54.03 (1st leg); with Bronte Campbell (2nd leg), Emma McKeon (3rd leg), Cate Campbell (4th leg)
^{b} split 51.69 (2nd leg); with Mollie O'Callaghan (1st leg), Meg Harris (3rd leg), Emma McKeon (4th leg)
^{c} split 1:55.63 (2nd leg); with Mollie O'Callaghan (1st leg), Brianna Throssell (3rd leg), Ariarne Titmus (4th leg)
^{d} split 51.73 (3rd leg); with Jack Cartwright (1st leg), Kyle Chalmers (2nd leg), Mollie O'Callaghan (4th leg)

== Olympic records ==
=== Long course metres ===
No.	Event	Time	Meet	Location	Date	Age	Status	Notes	Ref
1	4x100 m freestyle relay^{[a]}	3:28.92	2024 Summer Olympics	Paris, France	27 July 2024	25	Current		

Legend: WR – World record; OC – Oceanian record; NR – Australian record; e – equalled existing record;
Records not set in finals: h – heat; sf – semifinal; r – relay 1st leg; rh – relay heat 1st leg; b – B final; † – en route to final mark; so – swim-off; tt – time trial

^{a} split 52.35 (2nd leg); with Mollie O'Callaghan (1st leg), Emma McKeon (3rd leg), Meg Harris (4th leg)
