= Swimming at the 2018 Commonwealth Games – Women's 4 × 100 metre freestyle relay =

Women's swimming event in the 2018 Commonwealth Games

Women's 4 × 100 metre freestyle relay at the 2018 Commonwealth Games
- Venue: Gold Coast Aquatic Centre
- Dates: 5 April
- Competitors: 20 from 5 nations
- Winning time: 3:30.05

Medalists
gold medal	Shayna Jack; Bronte Campbell; Emma McKeon; Cate Campbell	Australia
silver medal	Alexia Zevnik; Kayla Sanchez; Penny Oleksiak; Taylor Ruck	Canada
bronze medal	Siobhan-Marie O'Connor; Freya Anderson; Anna Hopkin; Eleanor Faulkner	England

The women's 4 × 100 metre freestyle relay event at the 2018 Commonwealth Games as part of the swimming program took place on 5 April at the Gold Coast Aquatic Centre. 20 athletes from 5 nations competed, with Australia setting a world record time of 3:30.05 in the final to win gold.

== Records ==
Prior to this competition, the existing world and Commonwealth Games records were as follows.

Record	Time	Athlete (nation)	Meet	Location	Date	Ref
World record	3:30.65	Australia (AUS); Emma McKeon (53.41); Brittany Elmslie (53.12); Bronte Campbell (52.15); Cate Campbell (51.97)		Rio de Janeiro, Brazil	6 August 2016	
Commonwealth record	3:30.65	Australia (AUS); Emma McKeon (53.41); Brittany Elmslie (53.12); Bronte Campbell (52.15); Cate Campbell (51.97)		Rio de Janeiro, Brazil	6 August 2016	
Games record	3:30.98	Australia; Bronte Campbell (53.15); Melanie Schlanger (52.76); Emma McKeon (52.91); Cate Campbell (52.16)		Glasgow, United Kingdom	24 July 2014	

The following records were established during the competition:

Date	Event	Nation	Swimmers	Time	Record
5 April	Final	Australia	Shayna Jack (54.03); Bronte Campbell (52.03); Emma McKeon (52.99); Cate Campbell (51.00)	3:30.05	WR

== Results ==
The final was held at 21:50.

Rank	Lane	Nation	Swimmers	Time	Notes
1st place, gold medalist(s)	4	Australia	Shayna Jack (54.03); Bronte Campbell (52.03); Emma McKeon (52.99); Cate Campbell (51.00)	3:30.05	WR
2nd place, silver medalist(s)	5	Canada	Alexia Zevnik (53.95); Kayla Sanchez (53.82); Penny Oleksiak (54.33); Taylor Ruck (51.82)	3:33.92	
3rd place, bronze medalist(s)	3	England	Siobhan-Marie O'Connor (54.34); Freya Anderson (54.95); Anna Hopkin (53.82); Eleanor Faulkner (55.29)	3:38.40	
4	6	New Zealand	Laticia Transom (55.75); Georgia Marris (56.95); Carina Doyle (55.36); Helena Gasson (55.71)	3:43.77	
5	2	South Africa	Emma Chelius (56.37); Erin Gallagher (54.66); Marlies Ross (57.05); Dune Coetzee (57.96)	3:46.04	
