= Emma McKeon =

Australian swimmer (born 1994)

Emma McKeon AM
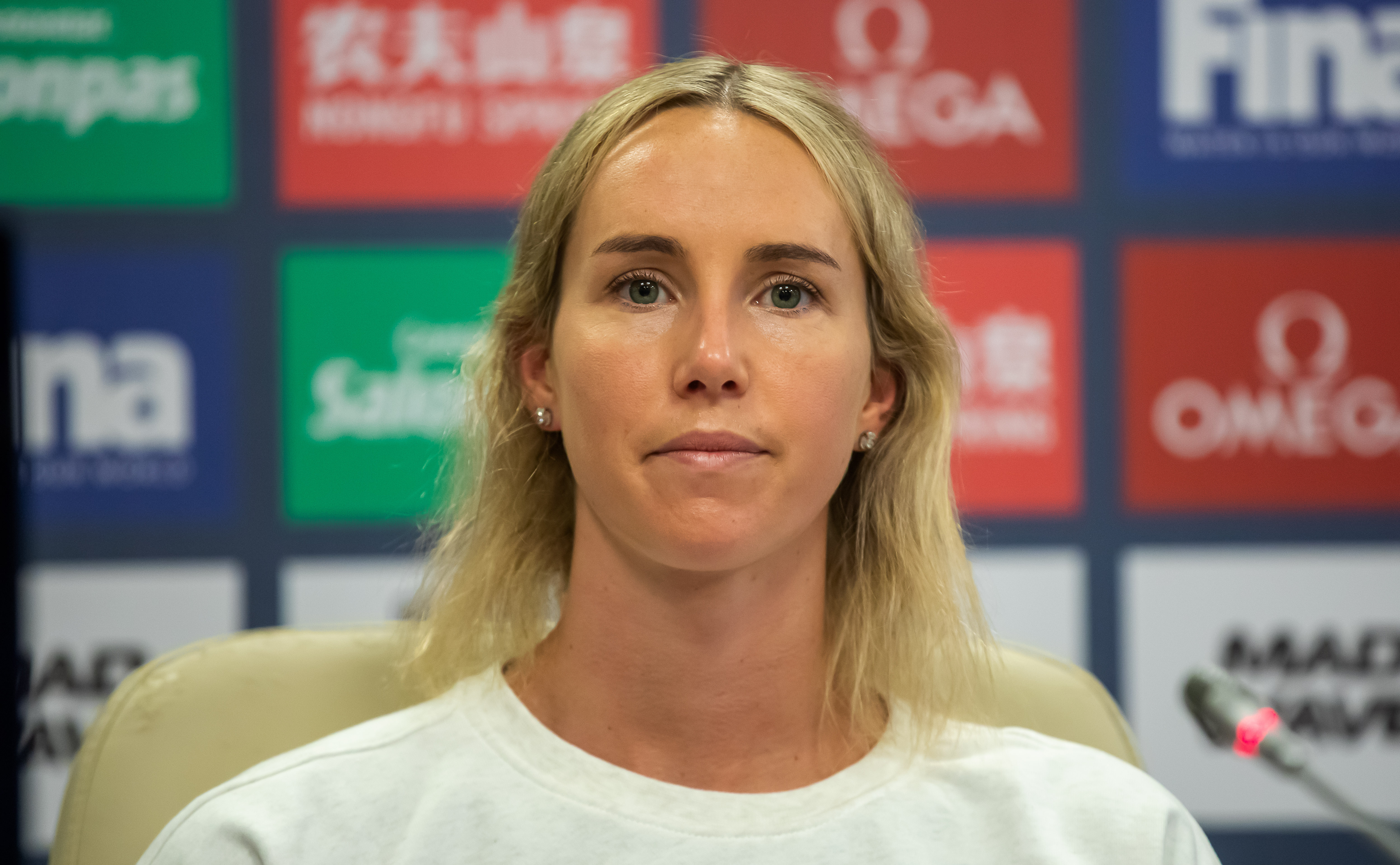
- McKeon in 2021

Personal information
- National team: Australia
- Born: Emma Jennifer McKeon; 24 May 1994 (age 32) Wollongong, New South Wales, Australia
- Height: 1.78 m (5 ft 10 in)
- Weight: 60 kg (132 lb)

Sport
- Sport: Swimming
- Strokes: Freestyle, butterfly
- Club: Griffith University
- Coach: Michael Bohl
Medal record
Women's swimming
Representing Australia
| Event | 1st | 2nd | 3rd |
|---|---|---|---|
| Olympic Games | 6 | 3 | 5 |
| World Championships (LC) | 5 | 11 | 4 |
| World Championships (SC) | 4 | 3 | 1 |
| Pan Pacific Championships | 4 | 1 | 2 |
| Commonwealth Games | 14 | 1 | 5 |
| Youth Olympic Games | 1 | 2 | 3 |
| Total | 34 | 21 | 20 |
Olympic Games
| Gold medal – first place | 2016 Rio de Janeiro | 4×100 m freestyle |
| Gold medal – first place | 2020 Tokyo | 50 m freestyle |
| Gold medal – first place | 2020 Tokyo | 100 m freestyle |
| Gold medal – first place | 2020 Tokyo | 4×100 m freestyle |
| Gold medal – first place | 2020 Tokyo | 4×100 m medley |
| Gold medal – first place | 2024 Paris | 4×100 m freestyle |
| Silver medal – second place | 2016 Rio de Janeiro | 4×200 m freestyle |
| Silver medal – second place | 2016 Rio de Janeiro | 4×100 m medley |
| Silver medal – second place | 2024 Paris | 4×100 m medley |
| Bronze medal – third place | 2016 Rio de Janeiro | 200 m freestyle |
| Bronze medal – third place | 2020 Tokyo | 100 m butterfly |
| Bronze medal – third place | 2020 Tokyo | 4×200 m freestyle |
| Bronze medal – third place | 2020 Tokyo | 4×100 m mixed medley |
| Bronze medal – third place | 2024 Paris | 4×100 m mixed medley |
World Championships (LC)
| Gold medal – first place | 2015 Kazan | 4×100 m freestyle |
| Gold medal – first place | 2019 Gwangju | 4×100 m freestyle |
| Gold medal – first place | 2019 Gwangju | 4×200 m freestyle |
| Gold medal – first place | 2019 Gwangju | 4×100 m mixed medley |
| Gold medal – first place | 2023 Fukuoka | 4×100 m freestyle |
| Silver medal – second place | 2013 Barcelona | 4×100 m freestyle |
| Silver medal – second place | 2013 Barcelona | 4×200 m freestyle |
| Silver medal – second place | 2013 Barcelona | 4×100 m medley |
| Silver medal – second place | 2017 Budapest | 200 m freestyle |
| Silver medal – second place | 2017 Budapest | 100 m butterfly |
| Silver medal – second place | 2017 Budapest | 4×100 m freestyle |
| Silver medal – second place | 2017 Budapest | 4×100 m mixed medley |
| Silver medal – second place | 2019 Gwangju | 4×100 m medley |
| Silver medal – second place | 2019 Gwangju | 4×100 m mixed freestyle |
| Silver medal – second place | 2023 Fukuoka | 4×100 m medley |
| Silver medal – second place | 2023 Fukuoka | 4×100 m mixed medley |
| Bronze medal – third place | 2015 Kazan | 4×100 m medley |
| Bronze medal – third place | 2017 Budapest | 4×200 m freestyle |
| Bronze medal – third place | 2017 Budapest | 4×100 m medley |
| Bronze medal – third place | 2019 Gwangju | 100 m butterfly |
World Championships (SC)
| Gold medal – first place | 2022 Melbourne | 50 m freestyle |
| Gold medal – first place | 2022 Melbourne | 100 m freestyle |
| Gold medal – first place | 2022 Melbourne | 4×100 m freestyle |
| Gold medal – first place | 2022 Melbourne | 4×50 m medley |
| Silver medal – second place | 2022 Melbourne | 4×50 m freestyle |
| Silver medal – second place | 2022 Melbourne | 4×100 m medley |
| Silver medal – second place | 2022 Melbourne | 4×50 m mixed freestyle |
| Bronze medal – third place | 2010 Dubai | 4×100 m medley |
Pan Pacific Championships
| Gold medal – first place | 2018 Tokyo | 4×100 m freestyle |
| Gold medal – first place | 2018 Tokyo | 4×200 m freestyle |
| Gold medal – first place | 2018 Tokyo | 4×100 m medley |
| Gold medal – first place | 2018 Tokyo | 4×100 m mixed medley |
| Silver medal – second place | 2014 Gold Coast | 4×200 m freestyle |
| Bronze medal – third place | 2018 Tokyo | 50 m freestyle |
| Bronze medal – third place | 2018 Tokyo | 100 m butterfly |
Commonwealth Games
| Gold medal – first place | 2014 Glasgow | 200 m freestyle |
| Gold medal – first place | 2014 Glasgow | 4×100 m freestyle |
| Gold medal – first place | 2014 Glasgow | 4×200 m freestyle |
| Gold medal – first place | 2014 Glasgow | 4×100 m medley |
| Gold medal – first place | 2018 Gold Coast | 100 m butterfly |
| Gold medal – first place | 2018 Gold Coast | 4×100 m freestyle |
| Gold medal – first place | 2018 Gold Coast | 4×200 m freestyle |
| Gold medal – first place | 2018 Gold Coast | 4×100 m medley |
| Gold medal – first place | 2022 Birmingham | 50 m freestyle |
| Gold medal – first place | 2022 Birmingham | 50 m butterfly |
| Gold medal – first place | 2022 Birmingham | 4×100 m freestyle |
| Gold medal – first place | 2022 Birmingham | 4×100 m medley |
| Gold medal – first place | 2022 Birmingham | 4×100 m mixed freestyle |
| Gold medal – first place | 2022 Birmingham | 4×100 m mixed medley |
| Silver medal – second place | 2022 Birmingham | 100 m butterfly |
| Bronze medal – third place | 2014 Glasgow | 100 m freestyle |
| Bronze medal – third place | 2014 Glasgow | 100 m butterfly |
| Bronze medal – third place | 2018 Gold Coast | 200 m freestyle |
| Bronze medal – third place | 2018 Gold Coast | 200 m butterfly |
| Bronze medal – third place | 2022 Birmingham | 100 m freestyle |
Youth Olympic Games
| Gold medal – first place | 2010 Singapore | 4×100 metre medley |
| Silver medal – second place | 2010 Singapore | 100 metre freestyle |
| Silver medal – second place | 2010 Singapore | 4×100m mixed freestyle |
| Bronze medal – third place | 2010 Singapore | 50 metre freestyle |
| Bronze medal – third place | 2010 Singapore | 200 metre freestyle |
| Bronze medal – third place | 2010 Singapore | 4×100m mixed medley |

Emma Jennifer McKeon, AM (born 24 May 1994) is an Australian retired competitive swimmer. She is an eight-time world record holder, three current and five former, in relays. Her total career haul of 14 Olympic medals following the 2024 Olympic Games includes one gold medal from the 2016 Summer Olympics in Rio de Janeiro, four gold medals from the 2020 Summer Olympics in Tokyo and one gold medal from the 2024 Summer Olympics in Paris. With four gold and three bronze medals she was the most decorated athlete across all sports at the 2020 Summer Olympics, and tied for the most medals won by a woman in a single Olympic Games. She also won 20 medals, including five gold medals, at the World Aquatics Championships; and a record 20 medals, including 14 gold, at the Commonwealth Games.

In 2024, McKeon surpassed Ian Thorpe for the most number of Olympic gold medals won over the course of an Australian athlete's career with six total gold medals earned at her three appearances at the Olympic Games. She was also the highest scoring competitor, male or female, for the 2021 FINA Swimming World Cup where she earned a total of fourteen medals, including ten gold medals and four silver medals. She is the most decorated Australian Olympian of all time and the eighth-most decorated Olympian of all time. She is widely considered one of the greatest swimmers of all time.

== Early life and education ==
McKeon was born on 24 May 1994 in Wollongong, New South Wales, Australia. She is the sister of Kaitlin and Olympian David McKeon, and the daughter of four-time Commonwealth gold medalist and two-time Olympian Ron McKeon, the latter two of whom are also swimmers. Her mother, Susie, was also a swimmer who competed in the Commonwealth Games and her uncle, Rob Woodhouse, was a two-time Olympian. She completed her secondary education in 2012 from The Illawarra Grammar School and following graduation, at the age of 18, relocated to Brisbane to train under Vince Raleigh at the Chandler Aquatic Centre in 2014. In 2015, McKeon switched coaches again and began training under Michael Bohl, initially at Brisbane's St Peters Western Swimming Club before the pair relocated to Griffith University on the Gold Coast in 2017 where McKeon studied a bachelor's degree in public health and health promotion with a major in nutrition.

== Swimming career ==
McKeon competed at the 2010 Summer Youth Olympics held in Singapore. She won a gold medal in the girls' 4 × 100 metre medley relay; silver medals in the 100 metre freestyle and the mixed 4 × 100 metre freestyle relay; and bronze medals in the 50 metre freestyle, 200 metre freestyle, and mixed 4 × 100 metre medley relay.

=== Olympic Games ===
==== 2012 Olympic Trials ====
McKeon missed out on being selected for the London 2012 Summer Olympics after failing to place in her freestyle and butterfly events at the 2012 Olympic Trials. The then 17-year-old agonisingly finished seventh in the 100 metres freestyle, one spot away from qualifying for her first Olympics in the 400 metres freestyle relay. As a result, she took a break from swimming to help rejuvenate her drive and love of the sport.

==== 2016 Summer Olympics ====
2016 Summer Olympics
| Gold medal – first place | 4x100 m freestyle relay | 3:30.65 (WR) |
| Silver medal – second place | 4x200 m freestyle relay | 7:44.87 |
| Silver medal – second place | 4x100 m medley relay | 3:55.00 |
| Bronze medal – third place | 200 m freestyle | 1:54.92 |

McKeon was selected as part of the Australian team for the 2016 Summer Olympics, held in Rio de Janeiro, Brazil. Her brother David was also selected meaning the pair were the first brother and sister to swim at an Olympic Games for Australia since John and Ilsa Konrads in 1960. McKeon led off the 4 × 100 metre freestyle relay in a 53.41 split, and with an overall world record time of 3:30.65, won a gold medal. In the 100 metre butterfly, McKeon swam a 57.33 to advance ninth into the semifinal where she placed second in a time of 56.81. In the final, McKeon finished in sixth place in a time of 57.05. McKeon swam a 1:55.80 in the 200 metre freestyle preliminary heats to continue into the semifinals where she qualified sixth with a time of 1:56.29. In the final, McKeon collected the bronze medal in a time of 1:54.92. As part of the 4 × 200 metre freestyle, McKeon swam the second leg of the race and with a split of 1:54.64, helped Australia earn a silver medal with an overall time of 7:44.87. McKeon swam a 56.95 in the butterfly leg of the 4 × 100 metre medley relay, collecting a silver medal as Australia finished with an overall time of 3:55.00.

==== 2020 Summer Olympics ====
2020 Summer Olympics
| Gold medal – first place | 4x100 m freestyle relay | 3:29.69 (WR) |
| Gold medal – first place | 100 m freestyle | 51.96 (OC, OR) |
| Gold medal – first place | 50 m freestyle | 23.81 (OR) |
| Gold medal – first place | 4x100 m medley relay | 3:51.60 (OR) |
| Bronze medal – third place | 100 m butterfly | 55.72 (OC) |
| Bronze medal – third place | 4x200 m freestyle relay | 7:41.29 (OC) |
| Bronze medal – third place | 4x100 m mixed medley relay | 3:38.95 |

At the 2020 Summer Olympics held in Tokyo, Japan, McKeon won seven medals, the most by a female swimmer at a single Olympic Games. Her feat equalled the most medals won by a female athlete in any sport at a single Olympic Games, tying Soviet gymnast Maria Gorokhovskaya. McKeon broke the record for the most Olympic medals ever received by an Australian, a title previously held by Ian Thorpe and Leisel Jones, after winning four gold and three bronze medals, and bringing her total medal count to 11.

In the 4 × 100 metre freestyle relay, McKeon swam a 51.35 split as the third relay leg, helping Australia to secure the gold medal and set a new world record with an overall time of 3:29.69. In the preliminary heats of the 100 metre butterfly, McKeon set a new Oceanian record with a time of 55.82 to advance into the semifinals, where she placed third with a time of 56.33. In the final, McKeon broke her Oceanian record with a time of 55.72, earning herself the bronze medal. McKeon swam the second leg of the 4 × 200 metre freestyle relay in a 1:55.31 split, helping Australia to win the bronze medal and set a new Oceanian record in an overall time of 7:41.29. In the 100 metre freestyle, McKeon advanced through to the semifinals after qualifying first in the preliminary heats with a time of 52.13. In the semifinal, she swam a 52.32 to make it through in first to the final, where she won the gold medal and set a new Olympic record with a time of 51.96, the second fastest time in history. McKeon anchored the mixed 4 × 100 metre medley relay final, and with a 51.73 freestyle split helped to win the bronze medal with an overall time of 3:38.95. In the 50 metre freestyle, McKeon swam a 24.02 in the preliminary heats to advance first into the semifinals, where she qualified first for the final in a time of 24.00. In the final, McKeon won gold and set a new Olympic record after swimming a time of 23.81. On the last day of competition, McKeon swam the butterfly leg of the 4 × 100 metre medley relay in a 55.91 split, her efforts helping Australia collect the gold medal and set a new Olympic record in an overall time of 3:51.60.

==== 2024 Summer Olympics ====
2024 Summer Olympics
| Gold medal – first place | 4x100 m freestyle relay | 3:28.92 (OR) |
| Silver medal – second place | 4x100 m medley relay | 3:53.11 |
| Bronze medal – third place | 4x100 m mixed medley relay | 3:38.76 (OC) |

At the 2024 Summer Olympic Games in Paris, France McKeon won 3 medals, one each of gold, silver and bronze. This brought her career Olympic medal tally to 14 medals equalling the total for most medals by a female swimmer.

On day 1 McKeon swam the fastest split (51.94) in the prelims of the 4×100 metre freestyle relay earning her a spot in the final swimming the 3rd leg for the Australian team. McKeon split 52.39 in the final with the Australians winning the gold medal with a time of 3:28.92. This was McKeon's 6th Olympic gold medal, the most gold medals won by any Australian Olympian.

The following day McKeon swam the final of the 100 metre butterfly finishing sixth with a time of 56.93. On day 7 she swam the butterfly leg in the prelims of the Mixed 4 × 100 metre medley relay with a 55.86 split earning a bronze medal when the Australians finished 3rd in the final.

On the final day of swimming at Paris McKeon swam the butterfly leg of the Women's 4 × 100 metre medley relay. The Australians finished 2nd in a time of 3:53.11 earning her a silver medal. McKeon's fly split was 56.25. This was the final swim of McKeon's career as she confirmed her retirement on 25 November 2024.

=== World Championships ===
==== 2013 ====
In 2013, McKeon won a silver medal in the 4 × 100 metre freestyle relay at the 15th FINA World Championships held in Barcelona, Spain. She also swam in the heats of the 4 × 100 metre medley relay and the 4 × 200 metre freestyle relay, helping Australia into the final, where they earned a silver medal in both events.

==== 2015 ====
In 2015, McKeon competed at the 16th FINA World Championships held in Kazan, Russia. She won a gold medal in the 4 × 100 metre freestyle relay, swimming a 53.57 split as the second leg of the race. The team swam an overall time of 3:31.48, setting a new World Championships record. In the 4 × 100 metre medley relay, McKeon swam a 57.59 split for the butterfly leg and with an overall time of 3:54.44, earned the bronze medal. McKeon also finished fourth in the 100 metre butterfly with a time of 57.67, and in a time of 1:56.41 placed seventh in the 200 metre freestyle.

==== 2017 ====
McKeon won four silver and two bronze medals at the 2017 World Swimming Championships in Budapest, Hungary. In the 100 m butterfly, McKeon advanced through to the semifinals after qualifying third in the preliminary heats with a time of 56.81. In the semifinal, she swam a time of 56.23, tying the Oceania record and placing second to make it through to the final. In the final, McKeon finished second behind Sarah Sjöström, with a time of 56.18, setting a new record of Oceania record and earning the silver medal. In the 200 m freestyle, McKeon swam a 1:56.61 in the preliminary heats to continue into the semifinals with the fourth fastest time. In the semifinals McKeon placed second in her heat and second overall with a time of 1:54.99 to advance into the final, where she finished equal second with a time of 1:55.15, sharing the silver medal with Katie Ledecky. McKeon anchored the 4×100 metre freestyle relay final and with a 52.29 split help to win a silver medal with an overall time of 3:32.01. As part of the 4 × 100 m mixed medley relay, McKeon swam the butterfly leg in a 56.51 split, and with an overall time of 3:41.21, the team set a new Oceanian record and helped themselves to the silver medal.

==== 2019 ====
At the 2019 World Aquatics Championships at Gwangju in South Korea McKeon won six medals. She won three gold medals for the 4×100 metre freestyle relay, 4×200 metre freestyle relay and 4 × 100 m mixed medley relay. In the 4x200 metre relay the Australians broke the world record setting a time of 7:41.50 with McKeon swimming the anchor leg in a split of 1:54.90. McKeon also collected two silver medals for the 4×100 metre medley relay and the 4 × 100 m mixed freestyle relay. In the mixed 4×100 metre freestyle relay final, McKeon split 1:54.90 as the third leg of the relay, and helped set a new Oceanian and Australian record with an overall time of 3:19.97. In her individual events, McKeon received a bronze medal for the 100 metre butterfly with a time of 56.61, and finished fourth in the 100 metre freestyle in a time of 52.75.

==== 2023 ====
McKeon won one gold and two silver medals at the 2023 World Aquatics Championships in Fukuoka, Japan. She won gold swimming the anchor leg for the Australian team in the 4×100 metre freestyle relay final with a 51.90 split. The Australians broke the world record by 1.73 seconds with a time of 3:27.96. McKeon also earned a silver medal swimming the butterfly leg of the 4×100 metre medley relay final with a 56.44 split with an overall time of 3:53.37. She also collected a silver medal for swimming the butterfly leg (56.70) in the preliminaries of the mixed 4 × 100 m medley relay.

In individual events McKeon finished fourth in the 100 metre butterfly with a time of 56.88, fifth in the 50 metre freestyle (24.35) and fifth in the 100 metre freestyle (52.83).

=== Commonwealth Games ===
==== 2014 ====
2014 Commonwealth Games
| Gold medal – first place | 200 m freestyle | 1:55.57 (GR) |
| Gold medal – first place | 100 m freestyle relay | 3:30.98 (WR) |
| Gold medal – first place | 200 m freestyle relay | 7:49.90 (GR) |
| Gold medal – first place | 100 m medley relay | 3:56.23 (GR) |
| Bronze medal – third place | 100 m freestyle | 53.61 |
| Bronze medal – third place | 100 m butterfly | 57.66 |

McKeon was selected as part of the Australian squad for the 2014 Commonwealth Games, held in Glasgow, Scotland. On the first day of competition, McKeon set a new Games record in the preliminary heats of the 200 metre freestyle with a time of 1:56.57. In the final, she broke that Games record with a new time of 1:55.57 to win the gold medal. As part of the 4 × 100 metre freestyle relay, McKeon swam the third leg and in a split of 52.91 helped Australia to the gold medal and set a new world record time of 3:30.98. In the 100 metre butterfly, McKeon placed sixth in the preliminary heats with a time of 58.83 to continue into the semifinal where she swam a 58.40, advancing into the final in fourth place. In the final, McKeon finished third in a time of 57.66 to earn the bronze medal. McKeon swam a time of 54.19 in the preliminary heats of the 100 metre freestyle to advance into the semifinals, where she finished in third place in a time of 53.92. In the final, McKeon swam a 53.61 to finish third behind the Campbell sisters as Australia took all podium positions. As part of the 4 × 200 metre freestyle relay, McKeon kicked off the race in a split of 1:56.01, and with an overall time of 7:49.90, Australia earned the gold medal and set a new Games record. In the 4 × 100 metre medley relay, McKeon swam the butterfly leg in a time of 56.95, to help Australia win the gold medal and set a new Games record in an overall time of 3:56.23. McKeon's six medals equalled a Commonwealth Games record for swimmers previously set by Ian Thorpe and Susie O'Neill.

==== 2018 ====
2018 Commonwealth Games
| Gold medal – first place | 100 m butterfly | 56.78 (GR) |
| Gold medal – first place | 4 × 100 m freestyle relay | 3:30.05 (WR) |
| Gold medal – first place | 4 × 200 m freestyle relay | 7:48.04 (GR) |
| Gold medal – first place | 4 × 100 m medley relay | 3:54.36 (GR) |
| Bronze medal – third place | 200 m freestyle | 1:56.26 |
| Bronze medal – third place | 200 m butterfly | 2:08.05 |

McKeon won the most number of medals in swimming at the 2018 Commonwealth Games in Gold Coast, Queensland, with four gold and two bronze medals; equalling her previous record set at the 2014 Commonwealth Games. Swimming in the 200 metre freestyle, McKeon placed second in the preliminary heats with a time of 1:57.40 to advance through to the final where earned the bronze medal in a time of 1:56.26. In the 4x100 metre freestyle relay, McKeon split a 52.99 as the third leg of the relay and with an overall time of 3:30.05, helped Australia win gold and set a new world record In the 100 metre butterfly, McKeon swam a time of 58.04 in the preliminary heats to continue into the semifinal where she finished third with a time of 57.94. In the final, McKeon swam 56.78 to win herself the gold medal and set a new Games record. McKeon started the 4 × 200 metre freestyle relay with a 1:56.62 split, which helped Australia win the gold medal and set a new Games record in an overall time of 7:48.04. McKeon qualified fourth in the 200 metre butterfly preliminary heats with a time of 2:09.55, making it through to the final where she picked up the bronze medal in a time of 2:08.05. As part of the 4x100 metre medley relay, McKeon split a 56.42 for the butterfly leg to help Australia win the gold medal and set a new Australian All Comers record with an overall time of 3:54.36.

==== 2022 ====
2022 Commonwealth Games
| Gold medal – first place | 50 m freestyle | 23.99 |
| Gold medal – first place | 50 m butterfly | 25.90 |
| Gold medal – first place | 4 × 100 m freestyle relay | 3:30.64 |
| Gold medal – first place | 4 × 100 m medley relay | 3:54.44 |
| Gold medal – first place | Mixed 4 × 100 m freestyle relay | 3:21.18 (GR) |
| Gold medal – first place | Mixed 4 × 100 m medley relay | 3:41.30 (GR) |
| Silver medal – second place | 100 m butterfly | 56.38 |
| Bronze medal – third place | 100 m freestyle | 52.94 |

As a result of her successful 2021 Olympics campaign, and under a new rule from Swimming Australia, McKeon was pre-selected for the 2022 Commonwealth Games in Birmingham, England without having to take part in the Australian Swimming Championships. Having also chosen to sit out of the 2022 World Aquatics Championships in Budapest, the Commonwealth Games was the first time McKeon raced competitively in 2022. McKeon broke the record for the most Commonwealth Games medals ever received after winning six gold, one silver and one bronze medals, and bringing her total medal count to 20. She also equalled the most gold medals won at a single Games previously set by Susie O'Neill and Ian Thorpe; and her eight medals equals the most medals won at a single Games, a record previously held by Susie O'Neill.

In the mixed 4 × 100 metre freestyle relay, a new event for the Games, McKeon split a 52.21 in the final leg, securing a gold medal and helping to set a Commonwealth Games record with an overall time of 3:21.18. McKeon anchored the women's 4 × 100 metre freestyle relay final and with a 52.04 split help to win a gold medal with an overall time of 3:30.64. In the 50 metre freestyle, McKeon advanced through to the semifinals after qualifying second in the preliminary heats with a time of 24.52. In the semifinal, she swam a time of 24.51, placing third and making it through to the final, where she won the gold medal in a time of 23.99. McKeon swam a 26.65 in the 50 metre butterfly preliminary heats to qualify fourth for the semifinal where she advanced through in a time of 26.02. In the final, McKeon earned herself a gold medal after finishing first in a time of 25.90. In another new event for the Games, McKeon anchored the mixed 4 × 100 metre medley relay, helping to win a gold medal and setting a Games record with a 51.88 split for her freestyle leg, and an overall time of 3:41.30. In the women's 4 × 100 metre medley relay, McKeon swam a 56.59 split for the butterfly leg and with an overall time of 3:54.44, earned the gold medal. In the 100 metre butterfly, McKeon swam a 57.34 in the preliminary heats to qualify first for the semifinal where she swam a 57.49 and again qualified first for the final. In the final, she finished in second place with a time of 56.38 securing a silver medal. In her final event of the program, McKeon swam a 55.36 in the 100 metre freestyle preliminary heats to advance through to the semifinals after qualifying in sixth position. In the semifinal, she swam a time of 53.1, qualifying first for the final, where she swam a 52.94 to finish in third place, earning a bronze medal.

=== International Swimming League (ISL) ===
McKeon was a member of the London Roar team and she competed in the 2019 and 2021 seasons of the International Swimming League (ISL). The ISL is an annual professional swimming league featuring a team-based competition format with fast-paced race sessions. 10 teams featuring the world's best swimmers compete.

=== 2021 Swimming World Cup ===
==== Stops 1—2: Berlin and Budapest ====
McKeon was the overall highest scoring female competitor at the short course 2021 FINA Swimming World Cup stop in Budapest, Hungary. Among the events she won in Budapest was the 50 metre butterfly in which she finished first with a time of 24.97 seconds. In the 100 metre freestyle, McKeon dropped almost half a second from her time at the first World Cup stop to win the gold medal in a time of 50.58 seconds which tied the World Cup record set by Sarah Sjöström of Sweden in 2017. Prior to stop two in Budapest, at the first stop in Berlin, she swam a personal best time in the 100 metre freestyle with a time of 50.96 seconds and won the gold medal. For the first two World Cup stops, Berlin and Budapest, McKeon was the highest scoring female competitor both at each individual stop and combined across both stops. McKeon's total score for the Budapest stop, 58.3 points, was the highest individual score by any competitor, male or female, for the first two stops of the World Cup circuit, with the only other competitors scoring in the 58 point range being Matthew Sates of South Africa who scored 58.2 points in Berlin, Tom Shields of the United States who scored 58.1 points in Budapest, and Kira Toussaint of the Netherlands who scored 58.1 points in Budapest. McKeon's moment where she tied the World Cup record set by Sarah Sjöström was ranked by FINA as the number five moment from the entire 2021 Swimming World Cup.

==== Stop 3: Doha ====
2021 World Cup — Doha
| Gold medal – first place | 100 m butterfly | 55.83 |
| Gold medal – first place | 100 m freestyle | 51.15 |
| Silver medal – second place | 50 m freestyle | 23.54 |
| Bronze medal – third place | 50 m butterfly | 25.07 |

Star status landed McKeon at the top of the list of athletes to watch at the third World Cup stop, held in Doha, Qatar, as named by Swimming World and FINA in advance of the start of competition. Going for building consistency in her four individual events, McKeon entered to compete in the 50 metre freestyle, 100 metre freestyle, 50 metre butterfly, and 100 metre butterfly in Doha. On day one of competition, McKeon swam a 24.09 in the prelims heats of the 50 metre freestyle in the morning, ranking second by a twenty-three hundredths of a seconds after Ranomi Kromowidjojo of the Netherlands and advancing to the final in the evening. Finishing in a time of 23.54 in the final, McKeon won her first medal of the Doha stop, a silver medal. Having won the gold medal in the 50 metre freestyle in Berlin and Budapest, the silver medal was her first non-gold medal finish in the event for the year's World Cup circuit. The next day, 22 October, McKeon raced in the timed final of the 50 metre butterfly, finishing in a time of 25.07 seconds and making the podium by winning the bronze medal. The third and final day of competition in Doha, she started off with 51.82 in the prelims of the 100 metre freestyle, ranking first overall and advancing to the final. In the evening finals session, McKeon swam a 55.83 and won the gold medal in her first race of the evening, the 100 metre butterfly. She finished off her events in Doha in the final of the 100 metre freestyle, swimming a 51.15 and finishing first to win the gold medal. When scores were tallied across the first three stops of the World Cup, McKeon retained her overall lead amongst female competitors with her total score of 170.0 points, though Kira Toussaint was not far behind in second-place with a score of 169.2 points.

==== Stop 4: Kazan ====
2021 World Cup — Kazan
| Gold medal – first place | 50 m freestyle | 23.53 |
| Gold medal – first place | 100 m butterfly | 55.63 |
| Gold medal – first place | 100 m freestyle | 50.67 |
| Silver medal – second place | 50 m butterfly | 24.94 |

Her entries in sprint events for both freestyle and butterfly at the fourth and final stop of the World Cup circuit, located at the Palace of Water Sports in Kazan, Russia for the year, were noted by FINA as races to watch during competition. McKeon spoke of competition for the last stop, providing context in terms of her history competing in Kazan and performance with a lack of spectators, at a FINA-hosted press conference preceding competition:

What I expect is a very hot week-end, and very interesting finals. I am happy to be back to Kazan as well. I hope to keep my lead. But I will mostly be focused on my own swimming, I will try to improve my time. First I visited the city in 2015, for the world championships, where I had my first individual races. Then we competed at the stadium, now – in the Aquatics Palace of Kazan. All in all, Russia is very different from Australia, but I like it. The competition will be held without spectators, like we did in Tokyo. That's our new reality. That does not help to swim, but there is no choice.

In the prelims heats of the 50 metre freestyle on day one of competition, McKeon was the only swimmer under 24 seconds and advanced to the final ranked first with her time of 23.98 seconds. She followed up her strong morning performance with a gold medal-winning time of 23.53 seconds in the final in the evening, just three hundredths of a second off her personal best time in the event. The morning of day two, McKeon tied for first in the prelims heats of the 50 metre butterfly with a time of 25.50 seconds and advanced to the final. Later in the day, she won the silver medal with a personal best time of 24.94 seconds in the final of the 50 metre butterfly. For the last day of competition of the World Cup circuit, McKeon had a busy morning, she started off by ranking first in the 100 metre butterfly prelims heats with a time of 57.35 seconds, which was about four tenths of a second ahead of second-ranked Maria Ugolkova of Switzerland. In the 100 metre freestyle prelims heats, her second race of the morning, McKeon ranked first again, this time by over a second ahead of second-ranked competitor Madison Wilson of Australia with her time of 51.94 seconds. McKeon won the gold medal in the final of the 100 metre butterfly later in the day, swimming a time of 55.63 seconds. She won her second gold medal of the day in the final of the 100 metre freestyle with a time of 50.67 seconds. Her time of 50.67 seconds registered as the fourth fastest swim in history and made two of the four fastest times in the event hers, she also had the second fastest swim of 50.58 seconds. Speaking of her wins, McKeon told FINA, "I am in pretty in good shape now. The preparations, which I took for the Olympics, still pay off." McKeon's performances across all four stops of the World Cup made her the highest overall scoring competitor of any gender, coming in at 228.3 total points and $144,000 of prize money. The only competitor to score higher than her at a single World Cup stop was male swimmer Daiya Seto of Japan who scored 58.9 points at the Kazan stop. In terms of total medals won by a female competitor, McKeon ranked third with her total of fourteen medals, which included ten gold medals, three silver medals, and one bronze medal, and in terms of similarity of medal count and breakdown with another competitor, male or female, she and Tom Shields of the United States had the exact same medal count and breakdown.

=== 2022 Short Course Championships ===
==== Australian Short Course Championships ====
At the Australian Short Course Swimming Championships held in Sydney, New South Wales in August 2022, McKeon swam a light schedule, competing in just two events. In the 100 metre freestyle, she swam 51.61 in the preliminary heats to qualify first for the final, where she won gold in a time of 51.03. McKeon again qualified first in the 50 metre freestyle preliminary heats with a time of 23.79. In the final, McKeon swam a 23.61 to finish first, earning herself a gold medal.

==== FINA World Short Course Championships ====
2022 Short Course Championships
| Gold medal – first place | 100 m freestyle | 50.77 (CR) |
| Gold medal – first place | 50 m freestyle | 23.04 (CR) |
| Gold medal – first place | 4 × 100 metre freestyle relay | 3:25.43 (WR) |
| Gold medal – first place | 4 × 50 metre medley relay | 1:42.35 (WR) |
| Silver medal – second place | 4 × 50 metre freestyle relay | 1:34.23 |
| Silver medal – second place | 4 × 100 metre medley relay | 3:44.92 |
| Silver medal – second place | Mixed 4 × 50 metre freestyle relay | 1:28.03 |

McKeon was selected as part of a 36-person team for the FINA World Swimming Championships held in Melbourne, Victoria in December 2022. McKeon started her campaign swimming a 51.76 split in the women's 4 × 100 metre freestyle relay in the preliminary heats to advance first through to the final. In the final, McKeon anchored the relay splitting a 49.96 and becoming the first woman to swim a sub-50 freestyle short course split. Her efforts earned Australia a gold medal and a new World Short Course record with an overall time of 3:25.43. In the 100 metre freestyle, McKeon advanced through to the semifinals after qualifying third in the preliminary heats with a time of 52.23. In the semifinal, she swam a 51.28 to make it through in first to the final, where she won the gold medal and set a new World Championships record with a time of 50.77. McKeon split a 22.73 in the last leg of the women's 4 × 50 metre freestyle relay final and with an overall time of 1:34.23, earned a silver medal. As part of the mixed 4 × 50 metre freestyle relay, McKeon swam the final leg of the preliminary heats in a time of 22.98 to see Australia qualify second for the final. In the final, McKeon anchored the relay and with a 22.62 split, she not only helped Australia win the silver medal, but she also become the fastest women in history to split a 50-free leg. In the 50 metre freestyle, McKeon swam a 23.93 in the preliminary heats to advance sixth into the semifinals, where she qualified second for the final in a time of 23.51. In the final, McKeon won gold and set a new World Championships record after swimming a time of 23.04. McKeon swam the butterfly leg of the women's 4 × 50 metre medley relay preliminary heat in a split of 23.23, and with an overall time of 1:44.78 qualified first for the final, where she again swam the butterfly leg in a time of 24.43. Her efforts helped Australia win a gold medal and with an overall time of 1:42.35 established a new World Short Course record. As part of the women's 4 × 100 metre medley relay, McKeon split a 53.93 for the butterfly leg and with an overall time of 3:44.92, collected a silver medal.

== Results in major championships ==
| Meet | 50 free | 100 free | 200 free | 50 fly | 100 fly | 200 fly | 4×50 free | 4×100 free | 4×200 free | 4×50 medley | 4×100 medley | 4×50 Mixed free | 4×100 Mixed free | 4×100 Mixed medley |
|---|---|---|---|---|---|---|---|---|---|---|---|---|---|---|
| WC 2013 | | | | | | | | 2nd place, silver medalist(s) | 2nd place, silver medalist(s) | | 2nd place, silver medalist(s) | | | |
| CG 2014 | | 3rd place, bronze medalist(s) | 1st place, gold medalist(s) | | 3rd place, bronze medalist(s) | | | 1st place, gold medalist(s) | 1st place, gold medalist(s) | | 1st place, gold medalist(s) | | | |
| PP 2014 | | 11th | 10th | | 4th | | | | 2nd place, silver medalist(s) | | | | | |
| WC 2015 | | | 7th | | 4th | | | 1st place, gold medalist(s) | 6th | | 3rd place, bronze medalist(s) | | | |
| OG 2016 | | | 3rd place, bronze medalist(s) | | 6th | | | 1st place, gold medalist(s) | 2nd place, silver medalist(s) | | 2nd place, silver medalist(s) | | | |
| WC 2017 | | 8th | 2nd place, silver medalist(s) | | 2nd place, silver medalist(s) | | | 2nd place, silver medalist(s) | 3rd place, bronze medalist(s) | | 3rd place, bronze medalist(s) | | | 2nd place, silver medalist(s) |
| CG 2018 | | | 3rd place, bronze medalist(s) | | 1st place, gold medalist(s) | 3rd place, bronze medalist(s) | | 1st place, gold medalist(s) | 1st place, gold medalist(s) | | 1st place, gold medalist(s) | | | |
| PP 2018 | 3rd place, bronze medalist(s) | 9th | | | 3rd place, bronze medalist(s) | | | 1st place, gold medalist(s) | 1st place, gold medalist(s) | | 1st place, gold medalist(s) | | | 1st place, gold medalist(s) |
| WC 2019 | | 4th | DNS | | 3rd place, bronze medalist(s) | | | 1st place, gold medalist(s) | 1st place, gold medalist(s) | | 2nd place, silver medalist(s) | | 2nd place, silver medalist(s) | 1st place, gold medalist(s) |
| OG 2021 | 1st place, gold medalist(s) | 1st place, gold medalist(s) | | | 3rd place, bronze medalist(s) | | | 1st place, gold medalist(s) | 3rd place, bronze medalist(s) | | 1st place, gold medalist(s) | | | 3rd place, bronze medalist(s) |
| CG 2022 | 1st place, gold medalist(s) | 3rd place, bronze medalist(s) | | 1st place, gold medalist(s) | 2nd place, silver medalist(s) | | | 1st place, gold medalist(s) | | | 1st place, gold medalist(s) | | 1st place, gold medalist(s) | 1st place, gold medalist(s) |
| SCW 2022 | 1st place, gold medalist(s) | 1st place, gold medalist(s) | | | | | 2nd place, silver medalist(s) | 1st place, gold medalist(s) | | 1st place, gold medalist(s) | 2nd place, silver medalist(s) | 2nd place, silver medalist(s) | | |
| WC 2023 | 5th | 5th | | | 4th | | | 1st place, gold medalist(s) | | | 2nd place, silver medalist(s) | | | 2nd place, silver medalist(s) |
| OG 2024 | | | | | 6th | | | 1st place, gold medalist(s) | | | 2nd place, silver medalist(s) | | | 3rd place, bronze medalist(s) |

== Career best times ==
=== Long course metres (50 m pool) ===
As of 1 August 2022

| Event | Time | Meet | Location | Date | Notes |
|---|---|---|---|---|---|
| 50 m freestyle | 23.81 | 2020 Summer Olympics | Tokyo, Japan | 1 August 2021 | Former OR |
| 100 m freestyle | 51.96 | 2020 Summer Olympics | Tokyo, Japan | 30 July 2021 | OC, NR, CR, OR |
| 200 m freestyle | 1:54.55 | 2019 Australian Swimming Trials | Brisbane, Australia | 11 June 2019 | |
| 400 m freestyle | 4:09.08 | 2013 McDonalds Queensland Championships | Brisbane, Australia | 14 December 2013 | |
| 200 m backstroke | 2:14.59 | 2010 Australian Age Group Championships | Sydney, Australia | 5 April 2010 | |
| 50 m butterfly | 25.70 | 2024 Australian Championships | Gold Coast | 19 April 2024 | |
| 100 m butterfly | 55.72 | 2020 Summer Olympics | Tokyo, Japan | 26 July 2021 | OC, NR |
| 200 m butterfly | 2:07.37 | 2017 Australian Swimming Championships | Brisbane, Queensland | 13 April 2017 | |

=== Short course metres (25 m pool) ===
As of 18 December 2022

| Event | Time | Meet | Location | Date | Notes |
|---|---|---|---|---|---|
| 50 m freestyle | 23.04 | 2022 World Championships (25 m) | Melbourne, Australia | 17 December 2022 | OC, NR, CR, ACR |
| 100 m freestyle | 50.58 | 2021 FINA Swimming World Cup | Budapest, Hungary | 9 October 2021 | Former =WCR |
| 200 m freestyle | 1:51.66 | 2015 Australian Championships (25m) | Sydney, Australia | 28 November 2015 | |
| 400 m freestyle | 4:00.63 | 2014 Australian Short Course Swimming Championships | Adelaide, Australia | 7 November 2014 | |
| 50 m backstroke | 26.88 | 2021 International Swimming League | Naples, Italy | 19 September 2021 | |
| 100 m backstroke | 58.68 | 2021 International Swimming League | Eindhoven, Netherlands | 4 December 2021 | |
| 50 m butterfly | 24.94 | 2021 FINA Swimming World Cup | Kazan, Russia | 29 October 2021 | |
| 100 m butterfly | 55.39 | 2019 International Swimming League | Budapest, Hungary | 26 October 2019 | |
| 200 m butterfly | 2:04.35 | 2017 Australian Championships (25m) | Adelaide, Australia | 28 October 2017 | |

== World records ==
=== Long course metres ===
| No. | Event | Time | Meet | Location | Date | Age | Status | Ref |
|---|---|---|---|---|---|---|---|---|
| 1 | 4x100 m freestyle relay^{[a]} | 3:30.98 | 2014 Commonwealth Games | Glasgow, Scotland | 24 July 2014 | 20 | Former | |
| 2 | 4x100 m freestyle relay (2)^{[b]} | 3:30.65 | 2016 Summer Olympics | Rio de Janeiro, Brazil | 6 August 2016 | 22 | Former | |
| 3 | 4x100 m freestyle relay (3)^{[c]} | 3:30.05 | 2018 Commonwealth Games | Gold Coast, Queensland | 5 April 2018 | 23 | Former | |
| 4 | 4x200 m freestyle relay^{[d]} | 7:41.50 | 2019 World Aquatic Championships | Gwangju, South Korea | 25 July 2019 | 25 | Former | |
| 5 | 4x100 m freestyle relay (4)^{[e]} | 3:29.69 | 2020 Summer Olympics | Tokyo, Japan | 25 July 2021 | 27 | Former | |
| 6 | 4x100 m freestyle relay (5)^{[f]} | 3:27.96 | 2023 World Aquatics Championships | Fukuoka, Japan | 23 July 2023 | 29 | Current | |

Legend: # – Record awaiting ratification by World Aquatics; e – equalled existing record;
Records not set in finals: h – heat; sf – semifinal; r – relay 1st leg; rh – relay heat 1st leg; b – B final; † – en route to final mark; so – swim-off; tt – time trial

^{a} split 52.91 (3rd leg); with Bronte Campbell (1st leg), Melanie Schlanger (2nd leg), Cate Campbell (4th leg)
^{b} split 53.41 (1st leg); with Brittany Elmslie (2nd leg), Bronte Campbell (3rd leg), Cate Campbell (4th leg)
^{c} split 52.99 (3rd leg); with Shayna Jack (1st leg), Bronte Campbell (2nd leg), Cate Campbell (4th leg)
^{d} split 1:54.90 (4th leg); with Ariarne Titmus (1st leg), Madison Wilson (2nd leg), Brianna Throssell (3rd leg)
^{e} split 51.35 (3rd leg); with Bronte Campbell (1st leg), Meg Harris (2nd leg), Cate Campbell (4th leg)
^{f} split 51.90 (4th leg); with Mollie O'Callaghan (1st leg), Shayna Jack (2nd leg), Meg Harris (3rd leg)

=== Short course metres ===
| No. | Event | Time | Meet | Location | Date | Age | Status | Ref |
|---|---|---|---|---|---|---|---|---|
| 1 | 4x100 m freestyle relay^{[a]} | 3:25.43 | 2022 World Championships (25 m) | Melbourne, Australia | 13 December 2022 | 28 | Former | |
| 2 | 4x50 m medley relay^{[b]} | 1:42.35 | 2022 World Championships (25 m) | Melbourne, Australia | 17 December 2022 | 28 | Current | |

^{a} split 49.96 (4th leg); with Mollie O'Callaghan (1st leg), Madison Wilson (2nd leg), Meg Harris (3rd leg)
^{b} split 24.43 (butterfly leg); with Mollie O'Callaghan (backstroke leg), Chelsea Hodges (breaststroke leg), Madison Wilson (freestyle leg)

== Olympic records ==
=== Long course metres ===
| No. | Event | Time | | Meet | Location | Date | Age | Status | Notes | Ref |
|---|---|---|---|---|---|---|---|---|---|---|
| 1 | 4x100 m freestyle relay^{[a]} | 3:30.65 | | 2016 Summer Olympics | Rio de Janeiro, Brazil | 6 August 2016 | 22 | Former | Former WR, OC, NR | |
| 2 | 4x100 m freestyle relay (2)^{[b]} | 3:29.69 | | 2020 Summer Olympics | Tokyo, Japan | 25 July 2021 | 27 | Former | Former WR, OC, NR | |
| 3 | 100 m freestyle | 52.13 | h | 2020 Summer Olympics | Tokyo, Japan | 28 July 2021 | 27 | Former | | |
| 4 | 100 m freestyle (2) | 51.96 | | 2020 Summer Olympics | Tokyo, Japan | 30 July 2021 | 27 | Current | OC, NR, CR | |
| 5 | 50 m freestyle | 24.02 | h | 2020 Summer Olympics | Tokyo, Japan | 30 July 2021 | 27 | Former | | |
| 6 | 50 m freestyle (2) | 24.00 | sf | 2020 Summer Olympics | Tokyo, Japan | 31 July 2021 | 27 | Former | | |
| 7 | 50 m freestyle (3) | 23.81 | | 2020 Summer Olympics | Tokyo, Japan | 1 August 2021 | 27 | Former | | |
| 8 | 4x100 m medley relay^{[c]} | 3:51.60 | | 2020 Summer Olympics | Tokyo, Japan | 1 August 2021 | 27 | Former | OC, NR | |
| 9 | 4x100 m freestyle relay (3)^{[d]} | 3:28.92 | | 2024 Summer Olympics | Paris, France | 27 July 2024 | 30 | Current | | |

Legend: WR – World record; OC – Oceanian record; NR – Australian record; e – equalled existing record;
Records not set in finals: h – heat; sf – semifinal; r – relay 1st leg; rh – relay heat 1st leg; b – B final; † – en route to final mark; so – swim-off; tt – time trial

^{a} split 53.41 (1st leg); with Brittany Elmslie (2nd leg), Bronte Campbell (3rd leg), Cate Campbell (4th leg)
^{b} split 51.35 (3rd leg); with Bronte Campbell (1st leg), Meg Harris (2nd leg), Cate Campbell (4th leg)
^{c} split 55.91 for butterfly leg; with Kaylee McKeown (backstroke), Chelsea Hodges (breaststroke), Cate Campbell (freestyle)
^{d} split 52.39 (3rd leg) with Mollie O'Callaghan (1st leg), Shayna Jack (2nd leg), Meg Harris (4th leg)

== Continental and national records ==
=== Long course metres ===
| No. | Event | Time | | Meet | Location | Date | Type | Status | Notes | Ref |
|---|---|---|---|---|---|---|---|---|---|---|
| 1 | 4x100 m freestyle relay | 3:32.43 | | 2013 World Championships | Barcelona, Spain | 28 July 2013 | OC, NR | Former | Former CR | |
| 2 | 4x100 m mixed medley relay | 3:46.52 | | BHP Billiton Aquatic Super Series | Perth, Australia | 31 January 2014 | OC, NR, ACR | Current ACR | | |
| 3 | 200 m freestyle | 1:55.68 | | 2014 Australian Championships | Brisbane, Australia | 1 April 2014 | OC, NR | Former | | |
| 4 | 200 m freestyle (2) | 1:55.57 | | 2014 Commonwealth Games | Glasgow, Scotland | 24 July 2014 | OC, NR | Former | | |
| 5 | 4x100 m freestyle relay (2) | 3:30.98 | | 2014 Commonwealth Games | Glasgow, Scotland | 24 July 2014 | OC, NR | Former | Former WR, CR | |
| 6 | 200 m freestyle (3) | 1:55.53 | | New South Wales Championships | Sydney, Australia | 6 March 2016 | OC, NR | Former | Former CR | |
| 7 | 200 m freestyle (4) | 1:54.83 | | 2016 Australian Olympic Trials | Adelaide | 9 April 2016 | OC, NR, ACR | Former | Former CR | |
| 8 | 4x100 m freestyle relay (3) | 3:30.65 | | 2016 Summer Olympics | Rio de Janeiro, Brazil | 6 August 2016 | OC, NR | Former | Former WR, CR | |
| 9 | 100 m butterfly | 56.23 | =, sf | 2017 World Championships | Budapest, Hungary | 23 July 2017 | OC, NR | Former | Former CR | |
| 10 | 100 m butterfly (2) | 56.18 | | 2017 World Championships | Budapest, Hungary | 24 July 2017 | OC, NR | Former | Former CR | |
| 11 | 4x100 m mixed medley relay (2) | 3:41.21 | | 2017 World Championships | Budapest, Hungary | 26 July 2017 | OC, NR | Former | Former CR | |
| 12 | 4x100 m freestyle relay (4) | 3:30.05 | | 2018 Commonwealth Games | Gold Coast | 5 April 2018 | OC, NR, ACR | Current ACR | Former WR, CR | |
| 13 | 4x100 m medley relay | 3:54.36 | | 2018 Commonwealth Games | Gold Coast | 10 April 2018 | ACR | Current | | |
| 14 | 4x100 m mixed medley relay (3) | 3:38.91 | | 2018 Pan Pacific Championships | Tokyo, Japan | 9 August 2018 | OC, NR | Former | Former CR | |
| 15 | 4x200 m freestyle relay | 7:44.12 | | 2018 Pan Pacific Championships | Tokyo, Japan | 10 August 2018 | OC, NR | Former | Former CR | |
| 16 | 4x200 m freestyle relay (2) | 7:41.50 | | 2019 World Championships | Gwangju, South Korea | 25 July 2019 | OC, NR | Former | Former WR, CR | |
| 17 | 4x100 m mixed freestyle relay | 3:19.97 | | 2019 World Championships | Gwangju, South Korea | 27 July 2019 | OC, NR | Former | CR | |
| 18 | 100 m butterfly (3) | 55.93 | | 2021 Australian Olympic Trials | Adelaide | 12 June 2021 | OC, NR, ACR | Current ACR | | |
| 19 | 100 m butterfly (4) | 55.82 | h | 2020 Summer Olympics | Tokyo, Japan | 24 July 2021 | OC, NR | Former | Former CR | |
| 20 | 4x100 m freestyle relay (5) | 3:29.69 | | 2020 Summer Olympics | Tokyo, Japan | 25 July 2021 | OC, NR | Former | Former WR, CR | |
| 21 | 100 m butterfly (5) | 55.72 | | 2020 Summer Olympics | Tokyo, Japan | 26 July 2021 | OC, NR | Current | | |
| 22 | 4x200 m freestyle relay (3) | 7:41.29 | | 2020 Summer Olympics | Tokyo, Japan | 29 July 2021 | OC, NR | Former | Former CR | |
| 23 | 100 m freestyle | 51.96 | | 2020 Summer Olympics | Tokyo, Japan | 30 July 2021 | OC, NR | Current | CR | |
| 24 | 4x100 m medley relay (2) | 3:51.60 | | 2020 Summer Olympics | Tokyo, Japan | 1 August 2021 | OC, NR | Current | CR | |
| 25 | 4x100 m freestyle relay (6) | 3:27.96 | | 2023 World Championships | Fukuoka, Japan | 23 July 2023 | OC, NR | Current | WR, CR | |

Legend: WR – World record; OC – Oceanian record; CR – Commonwealth record; NR – Australian record; e – equalled existing record; ACR – Australian All Comers record;
Records not set in finals: h – heat; sf – semifinal; r – relay 1st leg; rh – relay heat 1st leg; b – B final; † – en route to final mark; so – swim-off; tt – time trial

=== Short course metres ===
| No. | Event | Time | | Meet | Location | Date | Age | Type | Status | Notes | Ref |
|---|---|---|---|---|---|---|---|---|---|---|---|
| 1 | 4x100 m freestyle relay | 3:30.92 | | 2010 World Championships | Dubai, United Arab Emirates | 18 December 2010 | 16 | OC, NR | Former | Former CR | |
| 2 | 4x50 m mixed freestyle relay | 1:29.31 | | 2013 Swimming World Cup | Eindhoven, Netherlands | 8 August 2013 | 19 | OC, NR | Former | Former CR | |
| 3 | 200 m freestyle | 1:52.40 | | 2013 FINA World Cup | Singapore | 6 November 2013 | 19 | OC, NR | Former | Former CR | |
| 4 | 200 m freestyle | 1:52.59 | | 2014 Australian Championships | Adelaide, Australia | 9 November 2014 | 20 | ACR | Former | | |
| 5 | 200 m freestyle | 1:51.66 | | 2015 Australian Championships | Sydney | 28 November 2015 | 21 | ACR | Former | | |
| 6 | 4x100 m medley relay | 3:47.91 | | 2019 International Swimming League | Lewisville, United States | 20 October 2019 | 25 | OC, NR | Former | Former CR | |
| 7 | 4x100 m freestyle relay (2) | 3:28.77 | | 2019 International Swimming League | London, England | 23 November 2019 | 25 | OC, NR | Former | Former CR | |
| 8 | 100 m butterfly | 55.67 | | 2020 Australian Championships | Brisbane | 29 November 2020 | 26 | ACR | Former | | |
| 9 | 4x100 m freestyle relay (3) | 3:28.58 | h | 2022 World Championships (25 m) | Melbourne, Australia | 13 December 2022 | 28 | OC, NR, ACR | Former | | |
| 10 | 4x100 m freestyle relay (4) | 3:25.43 | | 2022 World Championships (25 m) | Melbourne, Australia | 13 December 2022 | 28 | OC, NR, ACR | Current | WR, CR | |
| 11 | 4x50 m freestyle relay | 1:34.23 | | 2022 World Championships (25 m) | Melbourne, Australia | 15 December 2022 | 28 | OC, NR | Current | CR | |
| 12 | 4x50 m mixed freestyle relay (2) | 1:28.03 | | 2022 World Championships (25 m) | Melbourne, Australia | 16 December 2022 | 28 | OC, NR | Current | CR | |
| 13 | 4x50 m medley relay | 1:44.78 | h | 2022 World Championships (25 m) | Melbourne, Australia | 17 December 2022 | 28 | OC, NR | Former | | |
| 14 | 4x50 m medley relay (2) | 1:42.35 | | 2022 World Championships (25 m) | Melbourne, Australia | 17 December 2022 | 28 | OC, NR, ACR | Current | WR, CR | |
| 15 | 50 m freestyle | 23.04 | | 2022 World Championships (25 m) | Melbourne, Australia | 17 December 2022 | 28 | OC, NR, ACR | Current | CR | |
| 16 | 4x100 m medley relay (2) | 3:44.92 | | 2022 World Championships (25 m) | Melbourne, Australia | 18 December 2022 | 28 | OC, NR | Current | CR | |

Legend: OC – Oceanian record; CR – Commonwealth record; NR – Australian record; e – equalled existing record; ACR – Australian All Comers record;
Records not set in finals: h – heat; sf – semifinal; r – relay 1st leg; rh – relay heat 1st leg; b – B final; † – en route to final mark; so – swim-off; tt – time trial

== Personal life ==
McKeon briefly dated fellow Australian swimmer Kyle Chalmers in 2021. In April 2022, McKeon began dating musician turned swimmer, Cody Simpson, although the couple did not confirm their relationship until July of the same year. It was confirmed in February 2026 the relationship with Simpson had ended.

At the 2022 'Better Future for All' forum held at Griffith University, McKeon suggested that while "you do want to be inclusive" it is "not fair" to expect cisgender women to compete against transgender women.

== Awards and honours ==
- Australian Women's Health Sport Awards, One to Watch: 2014
- Member of the Order of Australia (AM) in the 2022 Australia Day Honours for "significant service to swimming as a Gold Medallist at the Tokyo 2020 Olympic Games". McKeon was previously awarded the Medal of the Order of Australia in the 2017 Australia Day Honours for "service to sport as a gold medallist at the Rio 2016 Olympic Games".
- SwimSwam Top 100 (Women's): 2021 (#15), 2022 (#4)
- FINA, Top 10 Moments: 2021 Swimming World Cup (#5)
- FINA, Top 10 Moments: 2020 Summer Olympics (#8 for becoming the Australian athlete to win the most Olympic medals in any sport over the course of their career)
- Swimming World World Swimmer of the Year (female): 2021
- Swimming World Pacific Rim Swimmer of the Year (female): 2021
- FINA, Athlete of the Year, swimming (female): 2021
- SwimSwam Swammy Award, Oceania Swimmer of the Year (female): 2021
- SwimSwam Swammy Award, Swimmer of the Year (female): 2021
- The Australian, Australian of the Year nominee: 2021
- In 2022, McKeon received a nomination for the Laureus World Sports Award for Sportswoman of the Year.
- Swimming Australia, Olympic Program Swimmer of the Year: 2021
- Young Australian of the Year: 2024.

== See also ==
- List of Olympic medalists in swimming (women)
- List of multiple Olympic gold medalists
- List of multiple Olympic gold medalists at a single Games
- List of multiple Olympic medalists
- List of multiple Olympic medalists at a single Games
- List of multiple Summer Olympic medalists
- List of top Olympic gold medalists in swimming
- List of World Aquatics Championships medalists in swimming (women)
- List of Commonwealth Games medallists in swimming (women)
- List of Youth Olympic Games gold medalists who won Olympic gold medals
- World record progression 4 × 100 metres freestyle relay
- World and Olympic records set at the 2020 Summer Olympics

Sporting positions
| Preceded by Cate Campbell | FINA Swimming World Cup; Overall female winner 2021 | Succeeded by Beata Nelson |
Awards
| Preceded by Not awarded due to COVID-19 pandemic | FINA Swimmer of the Year; 2021 | Succeeded by Katie Ledecky |
| Preceded by Not awarded due to COVID-19 pandemic | Swimming World; Swimmer of the Year; 2021 | Succeeded by Ariarne Titmus |
| Preceded by Not awarded due to COVID-19 pandemic | Swimming World; Pacific Rim Swimmer of the Year; 2021 | Succeeded by Ariarne Titmus |
