= Swimming at the 2020 Summer Olympics – Mixed 4 × 100 metre medley relay =

Mixed 4 × 100 metre medley relay at the Games of the XXXII Olympiad
- Venue: Tokyo Aquatics Centre
- Dates: 29 July 2021 (heats); 31 July 2021 (final)
- Competitors: 76 from 16 nations
- Teams: 16
- Winning time: 3:37.58 WR

Medalists
1st place, gold medalist(s)		Kathleen Dawson, Adam Peaty, James Guy, Anna Hopkin, Freya Anderson*	Great Britain
2nd place, silver medalist(s)		Xu Jiayu, Yan Zibei, Zhang Yufei, Yang Junxuan	China
3rd place, bronze medalist(s)		Kaylee McKeown, Zac Stubblety-Cook, Matthew Temple, Emma McKeon, Isaac Cooper*, Brianna Throssell*, Bronte Campbell* *Indicates the swimmer only competed in the preliminary heats.	Australia

The mixed 4 × 100 metre medley relay event at the 2020 Summer Olympics was held in 2021 at the Tokyo Aquatics Centre. These Games marked the first time to feature a mixed-gender swimming event in the program. Each 4-person team features two male and two female swimmers in no particular order.

The medals for the competition were presented by Kirsty Coventry and the gifts bouquets were presented by Errol Clarke.

== Summary ==
Great Britain emerged as the inaugural Olympic champions in the mixed 4 × 100 metre medley relay as they put together a stunning all-round performance en route to a world record. Though 0.3 seconds off her time in the heats, Kathleen Dawson (58.80) nonetheless had the second-fastest female backstroke leg in the field before handing over to the British engine room of double Olympic champion in 100 metre breastroke, Adam Peaty (56.78) and renowned relay swimmer James Guy (50.00), who moved the British into the lead. Anna Hopkin (52.00) then extended Great Britain's margin over the field, touching for gold in 3:37.58 and lowering their Olympic record from the heats.

The world record holder coming into the meet, China was a shade off their former mark to take silver in 3:38.86. Leading off with two male swimmers, Xu Jiayu (52.56) and Yan Zibei (58.11), China were second behind Italy at the halfway mark. However, Zhang Yufei reeled off a strong 55.48 split to move the Chinese ahead of the Italians and only trail the British before Yang Junxuan (52.71) brought them home for second. As expected, 100 m backstroke champion Kaylee McKeown (58.14) led off the Australians in the fastest female backstroke leg in the field. With Australia in fourth after legs from Zac Stubblety-Cook (58.82) and Matthew Temple (50.26), 100 m freestyle champion Emma McKeon (51.73) blasted the fastest female anchor leg in the field to overtake Italy and claim bronze for the Australians in 3:38.95. In podium contention at the final changeover, Italy's Federica Pellegrini (52.70) could not hold off Australia's McKeon on the home stretch as Italy settled for fourth in a national record of 3:39.28.

As a relatively new event, tactical choice of male and female stroke remained a live issue, but a pattern had developed internationally of using a male breaststroker to reduce the disadvantage of the slowest of the four strokes. Opting against tradition by using a female breaststroker, albeit the Olympic women's champion, the decision backfired massively for the U.S. as they were left off the podium for only the second time in an entered relay event in Olympic swimming history after also failing to medal in the men's 4 × 200 metre freestyle relay a few days prior. Tied first following the backstroke leg alongside Italy's Thomas Ceccon, Ryan Murphy (52.23) handed over to 100 m breaststroke champion Lydia Jacoby (1:05.09), who shockingly swum with her goggles folded over her mouth. Covering the butterfly leg in 56.27, Torri Huske handed over the freestyle duties to Caeleb Dressel, in what would be his third race of the session. Despite being the only male anchor in the field, Dressel (46.99) could not overhaul the leaders as the U.S. claimed fifth in 3:40.58.

Meanwhile, the Netherlands clocked a national record of 3:41.25 to come sixth, ahead of ROC (3:42.45) and Israel (3:44.77).

== Records ==
Prior to this competition, the existing world and Olympic records were as follows.

World record	China (CHN); Xu Jiayu (52.45); Yan Zibei (57.96); Zhang Yufei (55.32); Yang Junxuan (52.68)	3:38.41	Qingdao, China	1 October 2020	
Olympic record	Inaugural event	—	—	—	—

The following records were established during the competition:

Date	Event	Name	Nation	Time	Record
29 July	Heat 1	Kathleen Dawson (58.50); Adam Peaty (57.08); James Guy (50.58); Freya Anderson (52.59)	Great Britain	3:38.75	OR
31 July	Final	Kathleen Dawson (58.80); Adam Peaty (56.78); James Guy (50.00); Anna Hopkin (52.00)	Great Britain	3:37.58	WR

== Qualification ==
The top 12 teams in this event at the 2019 World Aquatics Championships qualified for the Olympics. An additional 4 teams will qualify through having the fastest times at approved qualifying events during the qualifying period (1 March 2019 to 30 May 2020).

== Race rules ==
Each team has two male and two female swimmers. Each team decides whether a man or a woman will swim a specific stroke, which means men versus women is possible in a specific stroke, as happened in heats and in finals. Strokes order are in the same order as in a traditional medley race–backstroke, breaststroke, butterfly and freestyle.

The competition consists of two rounds: heats and a final. The relay teams with the best 8 times in the heats advance to the final. Swim-offs are used as necessary to break ties for advancement to the next round.

== Schedule ==
All times are Japan Standard Time (UTC+9)

Date	Time	Round
29 July	20:21	Heats
31 July	11:43	Final

== Results ==
=== Heats ===
The relay teams with the top 8 times, regardless of heat, advanced to the final.

Rank	Heat	Lane	Nation	Swimmers	Time	Notes
1	1	4	Great Britain	Kathleen Dawson (58.50); Adam Peaty (57.08); James Guy (50.58); Freya Anderson (52.59)	3:38.75	Q, OR, ER
2	1	5	United States	Regan Smith (57.64); Andrew Wilson (59.09); Tom Shields (50.87); Abbey Weitzeil (53.42)	3:41.02	Q
3	2	4	China	Xu Jiayu (52.67); Yan Zibei (58.61); Zhang Yufei (57.37); Yang Junxuan (53.64)	3:42.29	Q
4	2	5	Australia	Isaac Cooper (53.55); Zac Stubblety-Cook (58.80); Brianna Throssell (57.62); Bronte Campbell (52.38)	3:42.35	Q
5	2	6	Italy	Simone Sabbioni (53.96); Nicolò Martinenghi (58.38); Elena Di Liddo (57.29); Federica Pellegrini (53.02)	3:42.65	Q
6	1	3	Netherlands	Kira Toussaint (1:00.12); Arno Kamminga (58.15); Nyls Korstanje (51.86); Ranomi Kromowidjojo (53.12)	3:43.25	Q
7	2	3	ROC	Grigory Tarasevich (52.99); Kirill Prigoda (59.33); Arina Surkova (57.47); Maria Kameneva (53.94)	3:43.73	Q
8	2	8	Israel	Anastasia Gorbenko (59.59); Itay Goldfaden (59.65); Gal Cohen Groumi (51.06); Andrea Murez (53.64)	3:43.94	Q, NR
9	2	2	Japan	Anna Konishi (59.58); Shoma Sato (59.84); Katsuhiro Matsumoto (50.95); Rikako Ikee (53.78)	3:44.15	
10	1	2	Germany	Marek Ulrich (53.82); Fabian Schwingenschlögl (58.35); Lisa Höpink (58.06); Annika Bruhn (53.96)	3:44.19	
11	2	7	Greece	Apostolos Christou (53.18); Konstadinos Meretsolias (1:00.10); Anna Ntountounaki (57.08); Theodora Drakou (54.41)	3:44.77	NR
12	2	1	Belarus	Mikita Tsmyh (54.88); Ilya Shymanovich (58.85); Anastasiya Kuliashova (58.12); Anastasiya Shkurdai (54.50)	3:46.35	
13	1	6	Canada	Javier Acevedo (54.31); Gabe Mastromatteo (59.91); Katerine Savard (57.97); Rebecca Smith (54.35)	3:46.54	
14	1	7	Brazil	Guilherme Basseto (54.03); Felipe Lima (59.68); Giovanna Diamante (58.26); Stephanie Balduccini (54.77)	3:46.74	
15	1	8	Hungary	Benedek Kovács (53.76); Petra Halmai (1:08.11); Richárd Márton (51.49); Fanni Gyurinovics (53.79)	3:47.15	NR
	1	1	Poland	Paulina Peda (1:00.83); Jan Kozakiewicz (59.28); Jakub Majerski; Kornelia Fiedkiewicz	DSQ	

=== Final ===
Rank	Lane	Nation	Swimmers	Time	Notes
1st place, gold medalist(s)	4	Great Britain	Kathleen Dawson (58.80); Adam Peaty (56.78); James Guy (50.00); Anna Hopkin (52.00)	3:37.58	WR
2nd place, silver medalist(s)	3	China	Xu Jiayu (52.56); Yan Zibei (58.11); Zhang Yufei (55.48); Yang Junxuan (52.71)	3:38.86	
3rd place, bronze medalist(s)	6	Australia	Kaylee McKeown (58.14); Zac Stubblety-Cook (58.82); Matthew Temple (50.26); Emma McKeon (51.73)	3:38.95	
4	2	Italy	Thomas Ceccon (52.23); Nicolò Martinenghi (57.73); Elena Di Liddo (56.62); Federica Pellegrini (52.70)	3:39.28	NR
5	5	United States	Ryan Murphy (52.23); Lydia Jacoby (1:05.09); Torri Huske (56.27); Caeleb Dressel (46.99)	3:40.58	
6	7	Netherlands	Kira Toussaint (59.45); Arno Kamminga (57.89); Nyls Korstanje (51.34); Femke Heemskerk (52.57)	3:41.25	NR
7	1	ROC	Evgeny Rylov (52.79); Kirill Prigoda (59.15); Svetlana Chimrova (56.95); Maria Kameneva (53.56)	3:42.45	
8	8	Israel	Anastasia Gorbenko (59.55); Itay Goldfaden (59.86); Gal Cohen Groumi (51.58); Andrea Murez (53.78)	3:44.77	
