= St Michael's Church of England High School, Chorley =

Coordinates: 53.6616°N 2.6361°W

St Michael's CE High School
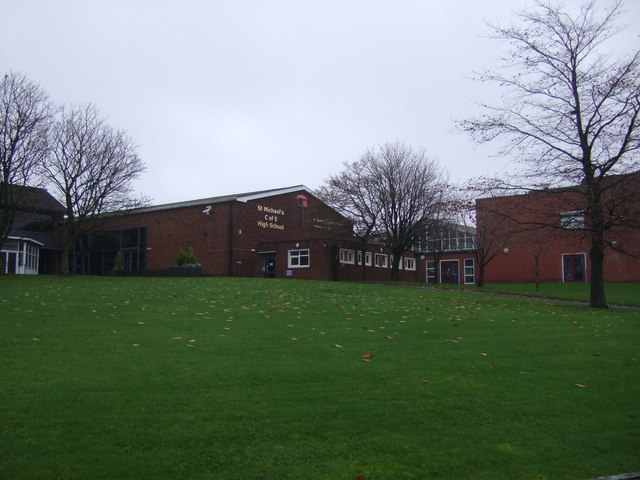
- View of the school grounds

Location
- Astley Road; Chorley, Lancashire, PR7 1RS; England

Information
- Type: Academy
- Religious affiliation: Church of England
- Established: 1956
- Department for Education URN: 136893 Tables
- Ofsted: Reports
- Head teacher: Rachel Rongong
- Staff: w
- Gender: Co-educational
- Age: 11 to 16
- Website: http://www.saint-michaels.com/

St Michael's is a Church of England secondary school located in the town of Chorley, Lancashire, England. The school is home to 1,200 pupils, and is a performing Arts College. Since January 2025, the headteacher has been Rachel Rongong, who took over from Jayne Jenks, who had occupied the post since 2016.

The school was established in 1964, as a Secondary Modern School. The first headteacher was Roy Moore. Educated at Lincoln College, Oxford he was an outlook, a Christian socialist, and a great believer in equality. A notable feature of the school, is that the houses and tutor groups are all named after people of notable Christian faith who have made significant personal, cultural, or religious contributions to society. The school became a comprehensive school in 1972, and an Academy in 2011.

The school's uniform is a maroon blazer incorporating the school logo and motto. The lower school tie is maroon, with multiple silver crosses. The upper school tie is the same however with a black background. Hughes or the Chapel Choir (for Years 9 to 11) have a silver tie with maroon crosses. An optional jumper for lower school is maroon with a silver logo, the higher school jumper is black with a silver logo.

== Notable former pupils ==
- Adam Henley, Welsh footballer
- Nick Anderton, English footballer
- Steve Pemberton, Actor
- Anna Hopkin, British Swimmer
- Emma Lamb, England Cricketer
