= Swimming at the 2023 World Aquatics Championships – Women's 4 × 100 metre freestyle relay =

Women's 4 × 100 metre freestyle relay at the 2023 World Aquatics Championships
- Venue: Marine Messe Fukuoka
- Location: Fukuoka, Japan
- Dates: 23 July (heats and final)
- Competitors: 80 from 18 nations
- Teams: 18
- Winning time: 3:27.96 WR

Medalists
| gold medal | Mollie O'Callaghan; Shayna Jack; Meg Harris; Emma McKeon; Brianna Throssell; Madison Wilson | Australia |
| silver medal | Gretchen Walsh; Abbey Weitzeil; Olivia Smoliga; Kate Douglass; Torri Huske; Maxine Parker | United States |
| bronze medal | Cheng Yujie; Yang Junxuan; Wu Qingfeng; Zhang Yufei; Ai Yanhan; Zhu Menghui | China |

The women's 4 × 100 metre freestyle relay competition at the 2023 World Aquatics Championships was held on 23 July 2023.

== Records ==
Prior to the competition, the existing world and championship records were as follows:

| World record | Australia; Bronte Campbell (53.01); Meg Harris (53.09); Emma McKeon (51.35); Cate Campbell (52.24) | 3:29.69 | Tokyo, Japan | 25 July 2021 |
| Competition record | Australia; Bronte Campbell (52.85); Brianna Throssell (53.34); Emma McKeon (52.57); Cate Campbell (51.45) | 3:30.21 | Gwangju, South Korea | 21 July 2019 |

The following new records were set during this competition:

| Date | Event | Nation | Swimmers | Time | Record |
|---|---|---|---|---|---|
| 23 July | Final | Australia | Mollie O'Callaghan (52.08); Shayna Jack (51.69); Meg Harris (52.29); Emma McKeon (51.90) | 3:27.96 | WR |

== Results ==
=== Heats ===
The heats were held at 13:03.

| Rank | Heat | Lane | Nation | Swimmers | Time | Notes |
|---|---|---|---|---|---|---|
| 1 | 2 | 4 | Australia | Shayna Jack (52.28); Brianna Throssell (53.95); Meg Harris (52.55); Madison Wilson (52.74) | 3:31.52 | Q |
| 2 | 2 | 5 | United States | Torri Huske (53.55); Olivia Smoliga (52.91); Maxine Parker (54.34); Abbey Weitzeil (52.54) | 3:33.34 | Q |
| 3 | 2 | 6 | Netherlands | Kim Busch (54.66); Milou van Wijk (54.84); Sam van Nunen (53.87); Marrit Steenbergen (52.13) | 3:35.50 | Q |
| 4 | 2 | 3 | Great Britain | Anna Hopkin (54.10); Lucy Hope (53.79); Abbie Wood (54.64); Freya Anderson (53.45) | 3:35.98 | Q |
| 5 | 1 | 5 | China | Yang Junxuan (54.20); Ai Yanhan (54.09); Zhu Menghui (54.56); Wu Qingfeng (53.41) | 3:36.26 | Q |
| 6 | 1 | 3 | Sweden | Sarah Sjöström (52.89); Michelle Coleman (53.20); Sara Junevik (54.96); Sofia Åstedt (55.24) | 3:36.29 | Q |
| 7 | 1 | 4 | Canada | Maggie Mac Neil (53.77); Mary-Sophie Harvey (53.99); Katerine Savard (54.47); Taylor Ruck (54.16) | 3:36.39 | Q |
| 8 | 2 | 8 | Japan | Rikako Ikee (54.51); Nagisa Ikemoto (53.96); Yume Jinno (55.02); Rio Shirai (54.22) | 3:37.71 | Q |
| 9 | 1 | 6 | Italy | Chiara Tarantino (54.95); Costanza Cocconcelli (54.14); Emma Menicucci (54.50); Sofia Morini (54.34) | 3:37.93 | |
| 10 | 2 | 7 | France | Béryl Gastaldello (54.50); Lison Nowaczyk (54.36); Mary-Ambre Moluh (55.05); Assia Touati (54.61) | 3:38.52 | |
| 11 | 2 | 2 | Brazil | Ana Carolina Vieira (54.46); Stephanie Balduccini (53.92); Celine Souza Bispo (55.20); Giovanna Diamante (55.41) | 3:38.99 | |
| 12 | 1 | 9 | Hong Kong | Camille Cheng (56.05); Siobhán Haughey (52.59); Tam Hoi Lam (55.36); Stephanie Au (55.93) | 3:39.93 | NR |
| 13 | 1 | 2 | Hungary | Petra Senánszky (55.10); Dóra Molnár (55.41); Lilla Minna Ábrahám (54.38); Nikolett Pádár (55.13) | 3:40.02 | |
| 14 | 1 | 0 | Denmark | Signe Bro (55.39); Julie Kepp Jensen (54.58); Emilie Beckmann (55.75); Helena Rosendahl Bach (55.49) | 3:41.21 | |
| 15 | 1 | 8 | Ireland | Mona McSharry (55.98); Danielle Hill (55.51); Erin Riordan (55.50); Victoria Catterson (54.76) | 3:41.75 | NR |
| 16 | 2 | 1 | Spain | Carmen Weiler (55.58); Ainhoa Campabadal (54.98); África Zamorano (55.61); Paula Juste (56.36) | 3:42.53 | |
| 17 | 1 | 7 | South Africa | Aimee Canny (54.95); Emma Chelius (56.28); Milla Drakopoulos (57.85); Trinity Hearne (56.46) | 3:45.54 | |
| 18 | 2 | 0 | Thailand | Kamonchanok Kwanmuang (57.70); Saovanee Boonamphai (59.86); Phiangkhwan Pawapotako (1:01.10); Jenjira Srisaard (58.18) | 3:56.84 | |
| | 1 | 1 | Singapore | DNS | | |
| | 2 | 9 | Mexico | DNS | | |

=== Final ===
The final was held at 21:32.

| Rank | Lane | Nation | Swimmers | Time | Notes |
|---|---|---|---|---|---|
| 1st place, gold medalist(s) | 4 | Australia | Mollie O'Callaghan (52.08); Shayna Jack (51.69); Meg Harris (52.29); Emma McKeon (51.90) | 3:27.96 | WR |
| 2nd place, silver medalist(s) | 5 | United States | Gretchen Walsh (54.06); Abbey Weitzeil (52.71); Olivia Smoliga (52.88); Kate Douglass (52.28) | 3:31.93 | |
| 3rd place, bronze medalist(s) | 2 | China | Cheng Yujie (53.39); Yang Junxuan (53.53); Wu Qingfeng (52.64); Zhang Yufei (52.84) | 3:32.40 | AS |
| 4 | 6 | Great Britain | Anna Hopkin (53.67); Lucy Hope (53.53); Abbie Wood (54.19); Freya Anderson (52.51) | 3:33.90 | NR |
| 5 | 7 | Sweden | Sarah Sjöström (52.24); Michelle Coleman (53.11); Sara Junevik (54.71); Louise Hansson (54.11) | 3:34.17 | |
| 6 | 3 | Netherlands | Kim Busch (55.05); Sam van Nunen (54.13); Milou van Wijk (54.39); Marrit Steenbergen (51.84) | 3:35.41 | |
| 7 | 1 | Canada | Summer McIntosh (54.99); Maggie Mac Neil (53.07); Mary-Sophie Harvey (54.57); Taylor Ruck (53.99) | 3:36.62 | |
| 8 | 8 | Japan | Rikako Ikee (55.09); Nagisa Ikemoto (53.62); Yume Jinno (55.26); Rio Shirai (54.64) | 3:38.61 | |
