= Swimming at the Summer Youth Olympics =

- Governing body: FINA
- Events: 28 (men: 14; women: 14)

Games
- 2010; 2014; 2018; 2026

Swimming was inducted at the Youth Olympic Games at the inaugural edition in 2010.

== Summary ==
Games	Year	Events	Best nation
1	2010	34	China
2	2014	36	China
3	2018	36	Russia
4	2026	28	Japan

== Medal table ==
As of the 2026 Summer Youth Olympics.

Rank	Nation	Gold	Silver	Bronze	Total
1	China	28	14	5	47
2	Russia	25	14	7	46
3	Hungary	15	4	4	23
4	Japan	9	4	5	18
5	Italy	6	6	9	21
6	Australia	5	10	17	32
7	Ukraine	5	3	2	10
8	United States	4	2	2	8
9	Croatia	4	2	0	6
10	Egypt	4	0	1	5
11	Lithuania	3	3	2	8
12	France	3	1	4	8
13	Czech Republic	3	0	2	5
14	South Africa	2	6	3	11
15	New Zealand	2	3	2	7
16	Romania	2	3	1	6
17	Canada	2	2	6	10
18	Vietnam	2	1	0	3
19	Brazil	1	6	1	8
20	Greece	1	4	1	6
20	South Korea	1	4	1	6
22	Great Britain	1	3	3	7
23	Argentina	1	2	2	5
23	Israel	1	2	2	5
25	Trinidad and Tobago	1	2	1	4
26	Norway	1	1	4	6
27	Netherlands	1	1	1	3
27	Sweden	1	1	1	3
29	Portugal	1	0	2	3
30	Ecuador	1	0	0	1
30	Moldova	1	0	0	1
30	Saudi Arabia	1	0	0	1
33	Germany	0	5	7	12
34	Serbia	0	4	1	5
35	Spain	0	3	3	6
36	Venezuela	0	3	2	5
37	Hong Kong	0	2	2	4
38	Belarus	0	1	3	4
38	Poland	0	1	3	4
40	El Salvador	0	1	0	1
40	Iran	0	1	0	1
40	Ireland	0	1	0	1
40	Kyrgyzstan	0	1	0	1
40	Lebanon	0	1	0	1
40	Singapore	0	1	0	1
40	Switzerland	0	1	0	1
40	Thailand	0	1	0	1
48	Slovenia	0	0	4	4
49	India	0	0	3	3
49	Mexico	0	0	3	3
51	Austria	0	0	2	2
51	Belgium	0	0	2	2
51	Cyprus	0	0	2	2
51	Slovakia	0	0	2	2
55	Bahamas	0	0	1	1
55	Chinese Taipei	0	0	1	1
55	Indonesia	0	0	1	1
55	Kuwait	0	0	1	1
55	Turkey	0	0	1	1
55	Uzbekistan	0	0	1	1
Totals (60 entries)		138	131	136	405

== See also ==
- Swimming at the Summer Olympics
- World Aquatics Junior Swimming Championships
