= Wu Qingfeng (swimmer) =

Chinese swimmer (born 2003)

Personal information
- Nationality: Chinese
- Born: 28 January 2003 (age 23) Shaoxing, Zhejiang, China
- Height: 180 cm (5 ft 11 in)

Sport
- Sport: Swimming
- Strokes: Freestyle
Medal record
Women's swimming
Representing China
Olympic Games
Bronze medal – third place	2024 Paris	4×100 m freestyle
Bronze medal – third place	2024 Paris	4x100 m medley
World Championships (LC)
Gold medal – first place	2023 Fukuoka	4×100 m mixed medley
Silver medal – second place	2025 Singapore	50 m freestyle
Silver medal – second place	2025 Singapore	4×100 m mixed medley
Bronze medal – third place	2023 Fukuoka	4×100 m freestyle
Bronze medal – third place	2025 Singapore	4×200 m freestyle
Bronze medal – third place	2025 Singapore	4×100 m medley
Asian Games
Gold medal – first place	2022 Hangzhou	4×100 m freestyle
Gold medal – first place	2022 Hangzhou	4×200 m freestyle
Gold medal – first place	2026 Aichi–Nagoya	50 m freestyle
Gold medal – first place	2026 Aichi–Nagoya	4×100 m freestyle
Silver medal – second place	2018 Jakarta	4×100 m freestyle
Silver medal – second place	2026 Aichi–Nagoya	50 m butterfly
Bronze medal – third place	2018 Jakarta	50 m freestyle

Wu Qingfeng (simplified Chinese: 吴卿风; traditional Chinese: 吳卿風; pinyin: Wú Qīngfēng; born 28 January 2003) is a Chinese swimmer and the reigning Asian Games champion in the women's 50 metre freestyle. She competed in the women's 4 × 100 metre freestyle relay event at the 2018 Asian Games, winning the silver medal. In 2019, she competed in the women's 50 metre freestyle at the 2019 World Aquatics Championships held in Gwangju, South Korea. She did not advance to compete in the semi-finals.
