= Anna Hopkin =

English swimmer (born 1996)

Anna Hopkin MBE
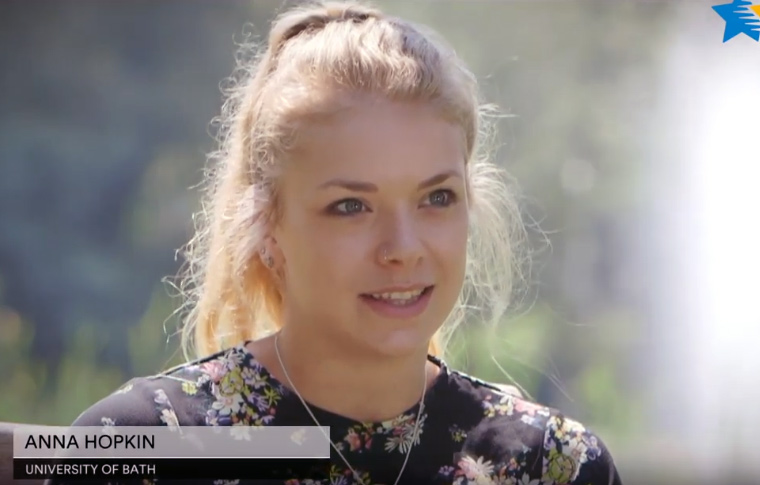
- Hopkin in an interview in 2017

Personal information
- Full name: Anna Elizabeth Hopkin
- Born: 24 April 1996 (age 30) Chorley, Lancashire, England
- Height: 1.65 m (5 ft 5 in)

Sport
- Sport: Swimming
- Strokes: Freestyle
- College team: TeamBath; Arkansas Razorbacks
Medal record
Women's swimming
Representing Great Britain
Olympic Games
Gold medal – first place	2020 Tokyo	4×100 m mixed medley
World Championships (LC)
Bronze medal – third place	2023 Fukuoka	4×100 m mixed freestyle
Bronze medal – third place	2024 Doha	4×100 m mixed medley
World Championships (SC)
Bronze medal – third place	2022 Melbourne	50 m freestyle
European Championships (LC)
Gold medal – first place	2020 Budapest	4×100 m freestyle
Gold medal – first place	2020 Budapest	4×100 m medley
Gold medal – first place	2020 Budapest	4×100 m mixed freestyle
Gold medal – first place	2020 Budapest	4×100 m mixed medley
Gold medal – first place	2022 Rome	4×100 m freestyle
Silver medal – second place	2022 Rome	4×100 m mixed freestyle
Bronze medal – third place	2020 Budapest	100 m freestyle
Bronze medal – third place	2022 Rome	4×100 m mixed medley
European Championships (SC)
Silver medal – second place	2019 Glasgow	4×50 m mixed freestyle
Representing England
Commonwealth Games
Silver medal – second place	2022 Birmingham	4×100 m freestyle
Silver medal – second place	2022 Birmingham	4×100 m mixed freestyle
Bronze medal – third place	2018 Gold Coast	4×100 m freestyle
Bronze medal – third place	2022 Birmingham	4×100 m medley

Anna Elizabeth Hopkin (born 24 April 1996) is a British swimmer. She won gold as part of the British team at the 2020 Tokyo Olympics in mixed 4 × 100 metre medley relay, setting a new world record time.

== Early life ==
Hopkin is from Chorley. She attended Withnell Fold Primary School and St Michael's C of E High School, and completed her A Levels at Runshaw College in 2014. She graduated from the University of Bath in 2018 with a degree in Sport and Exercise Science.

== Career ==
Hopkin competed for England in the women's 4 × 100 metre freestyle relay at the 2018 Commonwealth Games, winning a bronze medal.

In May 2021, at the European Championships held in Budapest, Hopkin won gold medals in women's 4 × 100 metre freestyle, women's 4 × 100 metre medley, mixed 4 × 100 metre freestyle and mixed 4 × 100 metre medley relays.

Hopkin was named as a member of the British team to go to the postponed 2020 Olympics in Tokyo. This would be her first Olympics and she joined as part of what was considered a "high quality" swimming team. Hopkin swam the anchor freestyle leg in the Mixed 4 x 100 metre medley relay, and won gold in a new world record time of 3 minutes 37.58 seconds together with Adam Peaty, James Guy and Kathleen Dawson.

In 2023, she won the gold medal at the 2023 British Swimming Championships in the 50 metres freestyle. It was the third consecutive time that she had won the 50 metres event. After winning both the 50 metres freestyle and the 100 metres freestyle at the 2024 Aquatics GB Swimming Championships, Hopkin sealed her place at the 2024 Summer Olympics.

At the 2024 Olympic Games in Paris, she participated in the women's 50 metre freestyle competition and women's 100 metre freestyle competition, where she was eliminated in the semifinals of both.

== Awards ==
Hopkin was appointed Member of the Order of the British Empire (MBE) in the 2022 New Year Honours for services to swimming.
