= Natalie Hinds =

American swimmer

Personal information
- Nationality: United States
- Born: December 7, 1993 (age 32) Midland, Texas, U.S.
- Height: 188 cm (6 ft 2 in)
- Weight: 76.2 kg (168 lb)

Sport
- Sport: Swimming
- Strokes: Freestyle, butterfly
- Club: Cali Condors; Gator Swim Club (2022–present); Athens Bulldog S.C. (2018–2021)
- College team: University of Florida
- Coach: Anthony Nesty (U. Florida)
Medal record
Women's swimming
Representing the United States
Event	1st	2nd	3rd
Olympic Games	0	0	1
World Championships (LC)	1	0	1
World Championships (SC)	1	2	0
Total	2	2	2
Olympic Games
Bronze medal – third place	2020 Tokyo	4×100 m freestyle
World Championships (LC)
Gold medal – first place	2022 Budapest	4×100 m medley
Bronze medal – third place	2022 Budapest	4×100 m freestyle
World Championships (SC)
Gold medal – first place	2022 Melbourne	4×50 m freestyle
Silver medal – second place	2022 Melbourne	4×100 m freestyle
Silver medal – second place	2022 Melbourne	4×50 m medley

Natalie Anisha Hinds is an American professional swimmer specializing in freestyle and butterfly events. She made her international championships debut at 27 years of age, winning a bronze medal in the 4×100 meter freestyle relay at the 2020 Summer Olympics, swimming in both the prelims and the final. In her first final at a World Championships in an individual event, she placed eighth in the 100 meter freestyle at the 2022 World Short Course Championships when she was 29 years old. At the 2022 US National Championships, she won the national title in the 100 meter freestyle. Between the 2022 World Aquatics Championships (long course) and the 2022 World Short Course Championships, she won a total of five medals in relay events as a prelims-only relay swimmer.

== Background ==
Hinds was born to parents Claudia Hinds and Melvin Hinds. She learned to swim early in life from her mom. She is a graduate of Midland High School. In college Hinds majored in Communication for her Bachelor of Arts degree from the University of Florida. She graduated with her degree in 2016.

After a break from swimming, Hinds trained with the Athens Bulldog Swim Club following her return to swimming in 2018 and through winning a medal at the 2020 Summer Olympics. In 2022, Hinds announced her return to Florida to train as part of the postgrad group at the University of Florida.

== Career ==
=== 2012–2018 ===
Hinds competed at her first US Olympic Team Trials in swimming in 2012 where she ranked 47th in the 100 meter butterfly with a time of 1:00.81 and did not advance to the 2012 Summer Olympics. In 2015, Hinds gained recognition from NBC, USA Swimming, and SwimSwam alongside Simone Manuel and Lia Neal for being the first trio of African-American swimmers at a Women's Division 1 NCAA Championship to sweep the podium, take first, second, and third place, in a single event. At the 2016 US Olympic Trials in swimming, Hinds ranked 40th in the 100 meter freestyle with a 56.31, 55th in the 50 meter freestyle with a time of 26.08 seconds, and 70th in the 100 meter butterfly with a 1:01.08, not qualifying for the 2016 Summer Olympics.

==== 2016–2018: Taking a break from swimming ====
In 2016 Hinds decided to take a break from swimming, transitioning to app development as part of her job at Turner Broadcasting based in Atlanta, Georgia. She returned to competitive swimming after being inspired by the 2018 USA National Championships.

=== 2020–2021: 27 years old at international championships debut ===
For the 2020—2021 time span, Hinds signed a professional endorsement deal with the United States division of swimwear company Arena.

==== 2020 US Olympic Trials ====
In the semifinals of the 100 meter freestyle at the 2020 US Olympic Trials in swimming, Hinds tied her training partner Olivia Smoliga for first place. Both Hinds and Olivia Smoliga touched in at 53.55 seconds in the first of two semifinals heats. In the final Hinds ranked fourth, qualifying for the U.S. Olympic Team in the 4×100 meter freestyle relay for the 2020 Summer Olympics. Her father was in the crowd in-person to see it happen, while her mother watched it play out on television as she was concerned about her anxiety and nerves potentially affecting her daughter's performance. In her other events, Hinds ranked 11th in the 100 meter butterfly semifinals with a time of 58.40 and ranked 11th in the 50 meter freestyle swimming a 25.14 in the semifinals.

==== 2020 Summer Olympics ====
2020 Summer Olympics
Bronze medal – third place	4×100 m freestyle relay	3:32.81

The 2020 Olympic Games in Tokyo, Japan were the first Olympic Games Hinds qualified to compete in and her first international championships, making her 27 years old at her international debut. Hinds swam in both the prelims and the final of the 4×100 meter freestyle relay. In the prelims, Hinds and her prelims relay teammates Olivia Smoliga, Catie DeLoof, and Allison Schmitt placed fifth overall and qualified the relay to swim in the final. Of the swimmers on her prelims relay, Hinds had the fastest individual time with a split of 53.28 seconds. She and her finals relay teammates Abbey Weitzeil, Simone Manuel, and Erika Brown swam a 3:32.81 and earned the bronze medal in the final. Hinds and Kieran Smith were the first two University of Florida Gators to win a medal at the 2020 Olympics.

==== International Swimming League ====
In 2021, Hinds was chosen to compete for California-based team Cali Condors in the 2021 International Swimming League. By the end of the 2021 season, Hinds had earned a total of 225 Most Valuable Player points over the 16 matches she had competed in since the debut of the International Swimming League in 2019, ranking her as 83rd out of 488 competitors in the history of the league in terms of total Most Valuable Player points earned.

=== 2022: First-time national champion at 28 years old ===
On day two of the 2022 Pro Swim Series in Westmont, Illinois in early March, Hinds placed fourth in the 100 meter freestyle with a time of 54.74 seconds. For the third day, she placed fifth in the final of the 100 meter butterfly with a time of 58.73 seconds, and on the fourth day she finished sixth in the final of the 50 meter freestyle with a 25.29 after swimming a 25.23 in the prelims heats.

==== Pro Swim Series – San Antonio ====
At the end of March, Hinds started competition at the 2022 Pro Swim Series stop held at Northside Swim Center in San Antonio, Texas by qualifying for the final of the 100 meter butterfly on day two with a 59.85 that ranked her eighth overall in the prelims heats. In the final, she placed sixth with a 59.37. In the morning prelims heats the next day, she swam a 25.39 to qualify for the final ranking third, 0.35 seconds behind first-ranked Claire Curzan and 0.04 seconds behind second-ranked Erika Brown. She placed fifth in the final with a time of 25.29 seconds. For the prelims heats of the 100 meter freestyle on day four, she qualified for the final ranking fourth with a time of 54.73 seconds. With a time of 54.30 seconds in the final, she placed third.

==== 2022 International Team Trials ====
In her first event of the 2022 US International Team Trials in Greensboro, North Carolina in April, the 100 meter freestyle on day one, Hinds ranked first in the prelims heats with a time of 53.77 seconds, qualifying for the final later the same day. She lowered her time to a 53.65 in the final to place fourth. On the second day, she ranked sixth and qualified for the final of the 50 meter butterfly with a personal best time of 26.07 seconds in the prelims heats. She swam a 26.18 in the final, finishing in sixth-place. The third day, she qualified for the final of the 100 meter butterfly, ranking sixth in the prelims heats with a time of 58.66 seconds. In the final, she swam a 58.45 to place seventh. On the final day, she qualified for the final of the 50 meter freestyle with a time of 25.16 in the prelims heats, which ranked her seventh across all prelims heats. For the final of the event, she finished less than half a second behind the first-place finisher to place seventh in a personal best time of 24.97 seconds. Her fourth-place finish in the 100 meter freestyle earned her a spot on the 2022 World Aquatics Championships team in the 4×100 meter freestyle relay.

==== 2022 World Aquatics Championships ====
2022 World Championships
Gold medal – first place	4×100 m medley	3:53.78 (h)
Bronze medal – third place	4×100 m freestyle	3:32.58 (h)

A week before the start of pool swimming competition at the 2022 World Aquatics Championships, Hinds was named as one of five captains for the swim team selected by USA Swimming. In the preliminaries of the 4×100 meter freestyle relay on June 18, she split a time of 53.89 seconds for the anchor leg of the relay to help advance the relay to the final ranking second. For the final, Claire Curzan substituted in and Hinds out for the anchor leg, and Hinds won a bronze medal for her efforts when the finals relay finished third with a time of 3:32.58. Swimming the butterfly leg of the 4×100 meter medley relay in the preliminaries, she split a 58.88 to help qualify the relay to the final ranking seventh. She won a gold medal for her efforts in the prelims when the finals relay, on which Torri Huske substituted in for her, placed first in 3:53.78.

==== 2022 National Championships ====
At the 2022 US National Swimming Championships, held in July in Irvine, California, Hinds won the national title and gold medal in the 100 meter freestyle with a personal best time of 53.53 seconds, finishing over three-tenths of a second ahead of silver medalist Gretchen Walsh. She also placed second in the B-final of the 200 meter freestyle with a personal best time of 1:59.82, which was 0.49 seconds behind B-final winner Lillie Nordmann.

==== 2022 Swimming World Cup ====
Approximately 1 year and 3 months after making her international championships debut at the 2020 Summer Olympics, Hinds entered to compete in her first FINA Swimming World Cup in the 50 meter butterfly and 50 meter, 100 meter, and 200 meter freestyle at the 2022 FINA Swimming World Cup held in her home country of the United States in the city of Indianapolis. On the first morning, she dropped 0.24 seconds from her personal best time in the 50 meter freestyle with a time of 24.47 seconds in the preliminary heats of the event, which qualified her for the final ranking seventh. In the evening final, she finished in a personal best time of 24.11 seconds and placed fifth. The morning of day two, she started off with a ninth-place ranking in the 200 meter freestyle with a personal best time of 1:56.51. Later in the session, she qualified for the final of the 50 meter butterfly with a time of 26.11 seconds and rank of eighth across all preliminary heats. In the evening final of the 50 meter butterfly, she achieved a sixth-place finish in a personal best time of 25.62 seconds. The third and final day, she ranked fourth in the preliminary heats of the 100 metre freestyle with a time of 52.31 seconds, qualifying for the final. In the evening, she placed fifth in the final with a time of 52.02 seconds, which was just one-hundredth of a second slower than her personal best time in the event.

==== 2022 World Short Course Championships ====
2022 World Championships (SC)
Gold medal – first place	4×50 m freestyle	1:33.89 (h)
Silver medal – second place	4×100 m freestyle	3:26.29 (h)
Silver medal – second place	4×50 m medley	1:42.41 (h)

Following her performances throughout the beginning of the 2022 year, Hinds earned a spot on the Team USA roster in the 100 meter freestyle for the 2022 World Short Course Championships in Melbourne, Australia. Her first day at the Championships, six days after she turned 29 years old, she started off with a time of 52.70 seconds for the third leg of the 4×100 meter freestyle relay in the preliminaries, contributing to a final-qualifying time of 3:31.11 that ranked the relay fourth overall. On the finals relay, Claire Curzan substituted in for her on the third leg and she won a silver medal for her efforts when the finals relay placed second in 3:26.29. In the morning of day two, she qualified for the semifinals of the 100 meter freestyle ranking eleventh with her time of 52.86 seconds from the preliminaries. Lowering her time to a 52.16 in the semifinals, she qualified for her first World Championships final in an individual event ranking seventh.

Day three of competition, Hinds and her prelims relay teammates in the 4×50 meter freestyle relay qualified the relay to the final ranking third with a time of 1:36.17, to which she contributed a split time of 23.92 seconds for the third leg. In the evening session, she placed eighth in the final of the 100 metre freestyle with a time of 52.24 seconds. When the finals relay for the 4×50 meter freestyle relay placed first in 1:33.89 later in the session, she won a gold medal for her prelims contribution. On day four, she split a 24.06 for the third leg of the 4×50 meter mixed freestyle relay, helping advance it to the final ranking fourth. She was substituted out for the finals relay, which finished in a time of 1:29.18 to place fourth. For her freestyle portion of the 4×50 meter medley relay the following morning in the event preliminaries, she split a time of 24.09 seconds, helping finish in 1:46.58 and qualify for the final ranking seventh. The finals relay, which she was not a member of, placed second in a time of 1:42.41 and she won a silver medal for her preliminary efforts.

== International championships (50 m) ==
Meet	4×100 freestyle relay	4×100 medley relay
OG 2020	3rd place, bronze medalist(s)	
WC 2022	(bronze) ^{[a]}	(gold) ^{[a]}

^{a} Hinds swam only in the preliminary heats.

== International championships (25 m) ==
Meet	100 freestyle	4×50 freestyle	4×100 freestyle	4×50 medley	4×50 mixed freestyle
WC 2022	8th	(gold) ^{[a]}	(silver) ^{[a]}	(silver) ^{[a]}	4th^{[a]}

^{a} Hinds swam only in the preliminary heats.

== Career best times ==
=== Long course meters (50 m pool) ===
Event	Time		Meet	Location	Date	Ref
50 m freestyle	24.97		2022 US International Team Trials	Greensboro, North Carolina	April 30, 2022	
100 m freestyle	53.53		2022 US National Championships	Irvine, California	July 26, 2022	
200 m freestyle	1:59.82	b	2022 US National Championships	Irvine, California	July 27, 2022	
50 m butterfly	26.07	h	2022 US International Team Trials	Greensboro, North Carolina	April 27, 2022	
100 m butterfly	58.40	sf	2020 US Olympic Trials	Omaha, Nebraska	June 13, 2021	

Legend: h – preliminary heat; sf – semifinal; b – B final

=== Short course meters (25 m pool) ===
Event	Time		Meet	Location	Date	Ref
50 m freestyle	24.11		2022 FINA Swimming World Cup	Indianapolis, Indiana	November 3, 2022	
100 m freestyle	52.01		2019 International Swimming League	Las Vegas, Nevada	December 21, 2019	
200 m freestyle	1:56.51	h	2022 FINA Swimming World Cup	Indianapolis, Indiana	November 4, 2022	
50 m butterfly	25.62		2022 FINA Swimming World Cup	Indianapolis, Indiana	November 4, 2022	
100 m butterfly	57.01		2019 International Swimming League	Las Vegas, Nevada	December 20, 2019	

Legend: h – preliminary heat

== See also ==
- List of Olympic medalists in swimming (women)
- List of people from Texas
- List of people from Midland, Texas
