= 2022 FINA World Swimming Championships (25 m) – Women's 100 metre freestyle =

Swimming competition

Women's 100 metre freestyle at the 2022 FINA World Swimming Championships (25 m)
- Venue: Melbourne Sports and Aquatic Centre
- Location: Melbourne, Australia
- Dates: 14 December (heats and semifinals); 15 December (final)
- Competitors: 63 from 55 nations
- Winning time: 50.77 CR

Medalists
gold medal	Emma McKeon	Australia
silver medal	Siobhán Haughey	Hong Kong
bronze medal	Marrit Steenbergen	Netherlands

The women's 100 metre freestyle competition of the 2022 FINA World Swimming Championships (25 m) was held on 14 and 15 December 2022.

== Records ==
Prior to the competition, the existing world and championship records were as follows.

World record	Cate Campbell (AUS)	50.25	Adelaide, Australia	26 October 2017
Competition record	Siobhán Haughey (HKG)	50.98	Abu Dhabi, United Arab Emirates	18 December 2021

The following new records were set during this competition:

Date	Event	Name	Nationality	Time	Record
15 December	Final	Emma McKeon	Australia	50.77	CR

== Results ==
=== Heats ===
The heats were started on 14 December at 11:41.

Rank	Heat	Lane	Name	Nationality	Time	Notes
1	8	4	Siobhán Haughey	Hong Kong	52.04	Q
2	9	3	Marrit Steenbergen	Netherlands	52.23	Q
2	9	4	Emma McKeon	Australia	52.23	Q
4	8	5	Béryl Gastaldello	France	52.34	Q
5	7	4	Madison Wilson	Australia	52.43	Q
6	8	3	Torri Huske	United States	52.48	Q
7	7	5	Barbora Seemanová	Czech Republic	52.54	Q
8	9	5	Katarzyna Wasick	Poland	52.56	Q
8	7	8	Taylor Ruck	Canada	52.56	Q
10	7	3	Michelle Coleman	Sweden	52.67	Q
11	8	6	Natalie Hinds	United States	52.86	Q
12	7	1	Sara Junevik	Sweden	52.91	Q
13	7	6	Cheng Yujie	China	53.03	Q
14	9	6	Anna Hopkin	Great Britain	53.06	Q
15	6	6	Snæfríður Jórunnardóttir	Iceland	53.21	Q, NR
16	9	1	Stephanie Balduccini	Brazil	53.32	Q
17	8	2	Chihiro Igarashi	Japan	53.38	
18	9	8	Barbora Janíčková	Czech Republic	53.45	
19	9	7	Katerine Savard	Canada	53.59	
20	8	1	Lena Kreundl	Austria	53.67	
21	8	8	Valentine Dumont	Belgium	53.77	
22	6	5	Neža Klančar	Slovenia	53.81	
23	8	7	Kim Busch	Netherlands	53.84	
24	7	2	Rio Shirai	Japan	53.88	
25	5	2	Anicka Delgado	Ecuador	54.19	NR
26	5	5	Jillian Crooks	Cayman Islands	54.20	NR
27	6	3	Teresa Ivanová	Slovakia	54.42	
28	5	6	Caitlin de Lange	South Africa	54.47	
29	5	8	Anna Hadjiloizou	Cyprus	54.52	
30	9	2	Isabella Hindley	Great Britain	54.57	
31	6	4	Diana Petkova	Bulgaria	54.58	
32	6	8	Hur Yeon-kyung	South Korea	54.59	
33	6	2	Lana Pudar	Bosnia and Herzegovina	54.76	
34	6	1	Elisbet Gámez	Cuba	54.87	
35	5	7	Inés Marín	Chile	55.28	NR
36	5	4	Amel Melih	Algeria	55.58	
37	6	7	Rafaela Fernandini	Peru	55.70	
38	5	1	Batbayaryn Enkhkhüslen	Mongolia	55.76	NR
39	4	7	Elisabeth Timmer	Aruba	55.88	NR
40	4	4	Vár Erlingsdóttir Eidesgaard	Faroe Islands	56.21	NR
41	4	5	Jasmine Alkhaldi	Philippines	56.51	
42	4	2	Karen Torrez	Bolivia	57.19	
43	2	7	María Castillo	Panama	57.58	
44	4	6	Ani Poghosyan	Armenia	57.91	
45	5	3	Arina Baikova	Latvia	58.27	
46	4	3	Oumy Diop	Senegal	58.47	
47	3	6	Hana Beiqi	Kosovo	59.03	
48	4	1	Aleka Persaud	Guyana	59.06	
49	3	3	Kaiya Brown	Samoa	59.17	
50	3	4	Darýa Semýonowa	Turkmenistan	59.20	
51	4	8	Nomvula Mjimba	Zimbabwe	59.81	
52	2	4	Mia Lee	Guam	1:00.38	
53	3	7	Lubaina Ali	Suspended Member Federation	1:00.63	
54	3	5	Georgia-Leigh Vele	Papua New Guinea	1:00.93	
55	3	2	Sophia Latiff	Tanzania	1:00.97	
56	3	1	Anushiya Tandukar	Nepal	1:02.49	
57	2	5	Charissa Panuve	Tonga	1:03.34	
58	2	3	Saba Sultan	Kuwait	1:04.62	
59	1	5	Sonia Aktar	Bangladesh	1:05.05	
60	1	4	Mashael Al-Ayed	Saudi Arabia	1:06.59	
61	3	8	Ammara Pinto	Malawi	1:07.47	
62	2	2	Abbi Illis	Sint Maarten	1:09.62	
63	2	6	Imelda Ximenes Belo	Timor-Leste	1:12.57	
	1	3	Mahra Al-Shehhi	United Arab Emirates	Did not start	
	7	7	Wu Qingfeng	China	Did not start	

=== Semifinals ===
The semifinals were started on 14 December at 19:57.

Rank	Heat	Lane	Name	Nationality	Time	Notes
1	2	5	Emma McKeon	Australia	51.28	Q
2	2	4	Siobhán Haughey	Hong Kong	51.69	Q
3	2	3	Madison Wilson	Australia	51.82	Q
4	1	4	Marrit Steenbergen	Netherlands	51.85	Q
5	1	5	Béryl Gastaldello	France	52.09	Q
6	1	3	Torri Huske	United States	52.11	Q
7	2	7	Natalie Hinds	United States	52.16	Q
8	1	6	Taylor Ruck	Canada	52.27	Q
9	2	2	Katarzyna Wasick	Poland	52.40	
10	1	2	Michelle Coleman	Sweden	52.44	
11	1	7	Sara Junevik	Sweden	52.50	
12	2	6	Barbora Seemanová	Czech Republic	52.59	
13	1	1	Anna Hopkin	Great Britain	52.74	
14	2	1	Cheng Yujie	China	52.90	
15	2	8	Snæfríður Jórunnardóttir	Iceland	53.19	NR
16	1	8	Stephanie Balduccini	Brazil	53.64	

=== Final ===
The final was held on 15 December at 19:42.

Rank	Lane	Name	Nationality	Time	Notes
1st place, gold medalist(s)	4	Emma McKeon	Australia	50.77	CR
2nd place, silver medalist(s)	5	Siobhán Haughey	Hong Kong	50.87	
3rd place, bronze medalist(s)	6	Marrit Steenbergen	Netherlands	51.25	
4	3	Madison Wilson	Australia	51.70	
5	7	Torri Huske	United States	52.04	
6	8	Taylor Ruck	Canada	52.08	
7	2	Béryl Gastaldello	France	52.13	
8	1	Natalie Hinds	United States	52.24	
