= Swimming at the 2020 Summer Olympics – Women's 4 × 100 metre freestyle relay =

Women's 4 × 100 metre freestyle relay at the Games of the XXXII Olympiad
- Venue: Tokyo Aquatics Centre
- Dates: 24 July 2021 (heats); 25 July 2021 (final)
- Competitors: 68 from 15 nations
- Teams: 15
- Winning time: 3:29.69 WR

Medalists
| 1st place, gold medalist(s) | | Bronte Campbell, Cate Campbell, Meg Harris, Emma McKeon, Mollie O'Callaghan*, Madison Wilson* | Australia |
| 2nd place, silver medalist(s) | | Kayla Sanchez, Maggie MacNeil, Rebecca Smith, Penny Oleksiak, Taylor Ruck* | Canada |
| 3rd place, bronze medalist(s) | | Erika Brown, Abbey Weitzeil, Natalie Hinds, Simone Manuel, Catie DeLoof*, Allison Schmitt*, Olivia Smoliga*; *Indicates the swimmer only competed in the preliminary heats. | United States |

The women's 4 × 100 metre freestyle relay event at the 2020 Summer Olympics will be held in 2021 at the Tokyo Aquatics Centre. It will be the event's twenty-fifth appearance at the Olympics, having been held at every edition since 1912.

== Swimming ==
Returning from their triumph five years earlier in Rio, the experienced trio of Emma McKeon and sisters Bronte and Cate Campbell joined with the youngster Meg Harris to win Australia's third consecutive Olympic title in dominating fashion. Bronte led off the quartet in 53.01 before handing over to Harris (53.09). Holding a marginal gap over the field, McKeon blasted a 51.35 split - the quickest in the field and fifth-fastest of all time - to give the Australians a monstrous lead of over two seconds. As she did in Rio, Cate (52.24) anchored Australia home to win gold in a world record of 3:29.69. Moreover, the Australians' victory margin of 3.09 seconds was the largest in the event since the U.S. won by 3.22 seconds in 2000.

Canada's Kayla Sanchez (53.42) and Maggie Mac Neil (53.47) handed the third-leg duties to Rebecca Smith (53.63), who moved the Canadians from fifth to fourth but still 0.67 seconds behind the pace of the Americans. However, in a thrilling duel between the 100 m freestyle defending champions Penny Oleksiak and Simone Manuel, Canada's Oleksiak split 52.26 to overtake the U.S.' Manuel (52.96) and secure Canada a surprise silver medal in 3:32.78 - their best finish in the event after three previous bronze-medal feats (1968, 1976, 2016). While Erika Brown's 54.02 lead-off had the U.S. in sixth, the remaining legs from Abbey Weitzeil (52.68), Natalie Hinds (53.15) and Manuel helped the U.S. to recover and win bronze in 3:32.81, just 0.03 seconds behind Canada.

Winners in 2008, the Netherlands (3:33.70) fell short of the podium to come fourth despite valiant efforts from the 2012 100 m freestyle champion Ranomi Kromowidjojo (52.87) and Femke Heemskerk (52.05), who had the second fastest split in the field behind McKeon. Great Britain (3:33.96) edged out Sweden (3:34.69), who were led off in an Olympic record of 52.69 by superstar Sarah Sjöström, for fifth place. China (3:34.76) and Denmark (3:35.70) rounded out the championship field.

== Records ==
Prior to this competition, the existing world and Olympic records were as follows.

| World record | Australia (AUS); Shayna Jack (54.03); Bronte Campbell (52.03); Emma McKeon (52.99); Cate Campbell (51.00) | 3:30.05 | Gold Coast, Australia | 5 April 2018 |
| Olympic record | Australia; Emma McKeon (53.41); Brittany Elmslie (53.12); Bronte Campbell (52.15); Cate Campbell (51.97) | 3:30.65 | Rio de Janeiro, Brazil | 6 August 2016 |

The following records were established during the competition:

| Date | Event | Name | Nationality | Time | Record |
|---|---|---|---|---|---|
| July 25 | Final | Bronte Campbell (53.01); Meg Harris (53.09); Emma McKeon (51.35); Cate Campbell (52.24) | Australia | 3:29.69 | WR |

== Qualification ==
The top 12 teams in this event at the 2019 World Aquatics Championships qualified for the Olympics. An additional 4 teams will qualify through having the fastest times at approved qualifying events during the qualifying period (1 March 2019 to 30 May 2020).

== Competition format ==
The competition consists of two rounds: heats and a final. The relay teams with the best 8 times in the heats advance to the final. Swim-offs are used as necessary to break ties for advancement to the next round.

== Schedule ==
All times are Japan Standard Time (UTC+9)

| Date | Time | Round |
|---|---|---|
| 24 July | 20:43 | Heats |
| 25 July | 11:45 | Final |

== Results ==
=== Heats ===
The relay teams with the top 8 times, regardless of heat, advance to the final.

| Rank | Heat | Lane | Nation | Swimmers | Time | Notes |
|---|---|---|---|---|---|---|
| 1 | 2 | 4 | Australia | Mollie O'Callaghan (53.08); Meg Harris (52.73); Madison Wilson (53.10); Bronte Campbell (52.82) | 3:31.73 | Q |
| 2 | 2 | 3 | Netherlands | Kim Busch (54.79); Ranomi Kromowidjojo (52.50); Marrit Steenbergen (54.32); Femke Heemskerk (51.90) | 3:33.51 | Q |
| 3 | 2 | 5 | Canada | Kayla Sanchez (53.45); Taylor Ruck (54.16); Rebecca Smith (53.73); Penny Oleksiak (52.38) | 3:33.72 | Q |
| 4 | 1 | 5 | Great Britain | Lucy Hope (54.37); Anna Hopkin (52.65); Abbie Wood (53.55); Freya Anderson (53.46) | 3:34.03 | Q, NR |
| 5 | 1 | 4 | United States | Olivia Smoliga (54.06); Catie DeLoof (53.42); Allison Schmitt (54.04); Natalie Hinds (53.28) | 3:34.80 | Q |
| 6 | 2 | 6 | China | Cheng Yujie (54.03); Zhu Menghui (53.48); Ai Yanhan (54.33); Wu Qingfeng (53.23) | 3:35.07 | Q, AS |
| 7 | 1 | 2 | Denmark | Pernille Blume (53.15); Signe Bro (53.19); Julie Kepp Jensen (54.72); Jeanette Ottesen (54.50) | 3:35.56 | Q, NR |
| 8 | 1 | 6 | Sweden | Sarah Sjöström (52.95); Michelle Coleman (53.44); Louise Hansson (53.68); Sara Junevik (55.86) | 3:35.93 | Q |
| 9 | 2 | 2 | Japan | Chihiro Igarashi (54.10); Rikako Ikee (53.63); Natsumi Sakai (54.70); Rika Omoto (53.77) | 3:36.20 | |
| 10 | 1 | 3 | France | Béryl Gastaldello (54.28); Charlotte Bonnet (53.05); Margaux Fabre (54.83); Anouchka Martin (54.45) | 3:36.61 | |
| 11 | 2 | 1 | ROC | Daria S. Ustinova (54.75); Arina Surkova (54.54); Elizaveta Klevanovich (54.57); Veronika Andrusenko (54.39) | 3:38.25 | |
| 12 | 1 | 7 | Brazil | Larissa Oliveira (54.79); Ana Carolina Vieira (54.92); Etiene Medeiros (55.42); Stephanie Balduccini (54.06) | 3:39.19 | |
| 13 | 2 | 7 | Germany | Lisa Höpink (54.83); Annika Bruhn (54.33); Marie Pietruschka (55.31); Hannah Küchler (54.86) | 3:39.33 | |
| 14 | 2 | 8 | Czech Republic | Barbora Seemanová (53.86); Kristýna Horská (56.72); Barbora Janíčková (55.89); Anika Apostalon (55.93) | 3:42.40 | |
| 15 | 1 | 1 | Hong Kong | Tam Hoi Lam (55.58); Camille Cheng (54.61); Stephanie Au (56.96); Ho Nam Wai (56.37) | 3:43.52 | |

=== Final ===
| Rank | Lane | Nation | Swimmers | Time | Notes |
|---|---|---|---|---|---|
| 1st place, gold medalist(s) | 4 | Australia | Bronte Campbell (53.01); Meg Harris (53.09); Emma McKeon (51.35); Cate Campbell (52.24) | 3:29.69 | WR |
| 2nd place, silver medalist(s) | 3 | Canada | Kayla Sanchez (53.42); Margaret MacNeil (53.47); Rebecca Smith (53.63); Penny Oleksiak (52.26) | 3:32.78 | |
| 3rd place, bronze medalist(s) | 2 | United States | Erika Brown (54.02); Abbey Weitzeil (52.68); Natalie Hinds (53.15); Simone Manuel (52.96) | 3:32.81 | |
| 4 | 5 | Netherlands | Kim Busch (54.64); Ranomi Kromowidjojo (52.87); Kira Toussaint (54.14); Femke Heemskerk (52.05) | 3:33.70 | |
| 5 | 6 | Great Britain | Anna Hopkin (53.16); Abbie Wood (53.23); Lucy Hope (54.73); Freya Anderson (52.84) | 3:33.96 | NR |
| 6 | 8 | Sweden | Sarah Sjöström (52.62) OR; Michelle Coleman (53.62); Louise Hansson (53.51); Sophie Hansson (54.94) | 3:34.69 | |
| 7 | 7 | China | Cheng Yujie (54.10); Zhu Menghui (53.54); Ai Yanhan (54.22); Wu Qingfeng (52.90) | 3:34.76 | AS |
| 8 | 1 | Denmark | Pernille Blume (53.07); Signe Bro (53.78); Julie Kepp Jensen (54.46); Jeanette Ottesen (54.39) | 3:35.70 | |
