= List of people from Midland, Texas =

This is a list of notable people who were born in, residents of, or otherwise closely associated with the American city of Midland, Texas.

== Armed forces ==
- Tommy Franks, retired General, United States Army
- George H. O'Brien Jr., Medal of Honor recipient
- Lisa Trubnikova, United States Coast Guard officer and murder victim

== Arts ==
=== Film, television, and theater ===
- Michael Arden, actor
- Kathy Baker, actress
- Jeannette Charles, actress
- Ed Graczyk, playwright
- Woody Harrelson, actor
- Tommy Lee Jones, actor
- Paul Brad Logan, screenwriter and author
- Bessie Love, actress
- Carolyn McCormick, actress
- Douglas McGrath, film writer and director
- Jackson Rathbone, actor and musician

=== Journalism and literature ===
- Raymond Benson, author of post-Ian Fleming James Bond novels
- Marilyn Buck, poet, translator, revolutionary, and political prisoner
- Tracy Daugherty, author and biographer
- John R. Erickson, author of the Hank the Cowdog book series
- Doyle Glass, historian and sculptor
- Stephen Graham Jones, writer
- Larry L. King, author
- Cathy Luchetti, writer
- Larry D. Thomas, 2008 Texas State Poet Laureate
- Eileen Wilks, romance and urban fantasy author

=== Music ===
- Kirk Covington, drummer with Tribal Tech
- Explosions in the Sky, three of the four members of indie rock group hail from Midland (Mark Smith - guitar, synthesizer; Michael James - guitar, bass, keyboards; and Munaf Rayani - guitar, keyboards, percussion)
- Susan Graham, mezzo-soprano
- Happy-Tom (Thomas Seltzer), bassist (originally drummer) and main songwriter in the band Turbonegro
- Sam Canty, vocalist and guitarist in the band Treaty Oak Revival

== Athletes ==
- Brett Anderson, MLB player
- Cedric Benson, NFL player
- Mookie Blaylock, NBA player
- Hal Dean, NFL player
- Antwan Goodley Jr., NFL player
- Jim Hall, race car designer, owner, driver
- Bobby Hillin, NASCAR driver
- Natalie Hinds, Olympic swimmer
- E. J. Holub, NFL player
- Bryce Hoppel, middle distance runner
- Herb Johnson, NBA player
- KC Jones, NBA player
- Wahoo McDaniel, AFL player and wrestler
- Jayson Nix, MLB player
- Laynce Nix, MLB player
- Max Muncy, MLB player
- Judy Rankin, LPGA all-time money winner
- Doug Russell, 1968 Olympic gold medalist
- Carson Smith, MLB player
- Mike Stanton, MLB player
- Mike Timlin, MLB player
- Rex Tucker, NFL player
- Ryan Tucker, NFL player
- Randy Velarde, MLB player
- Spud Webb, NBA player
- Eric Winston, NFL player
- Tyler Young, NASCAR driver
- James Zachery, CFL player

== Business ==
- Frederic C. Hamilton, businessman, philanthropist
- J. Hugh Liedtke, founder of Pennzoil
- Clarence Scharbauer (1879–1942), rancher, president of the First National Bank of Midland and the Midland Fair

== Government and politics ==
- Ernest Angelo, mayor of Midland, 1972–1980; Republican national committeeman, 1976–1996
- Barbara Bush, former first lady of the United States
- Barbara Pierce Bush, daughter of former president George W. Bush
- George H. W. Bush, 41st president of the United States
- George W. Bush, 43rd president of the United States
- Jeb Bush, former governor of Florida
- Jenna Bush Hager, daughter of former president George W. Bush
- Laura Bush, former first lady of the United States
- Frank Kell Cahoon, Midland oilman; the only Republican in the Texas legislature, 1965–1966; former Midland City Council member
- Mike Conaway, United States congressman
- Tom Craddick, District 82 state representative and former Speaker of the Texas House
- Donald Evans, former US Secretary of Commerce
- Deborah Fikes, executive advisor and representative to United Nations for World Evangelical Alliance
- Kenn George, former state representative from Dallas County and unsuccessful candidate for Texas land commissioner
- David J. Porter, Republican, Texas Railroad Commission member, 2010–2016
- Carol Schwartz, former member of the D.C. city council, raised in Midland
- W. E. "Pete" Snelson, member of both houses of the Texas State Legislature from Midland; later an educational consultant in Austin
- Clayton Williams, businessman and 1990 gubernatorial candidate
- Michael L. Williams, Texas Railroad Commission member

== Science and technology ==
- Leeon D. Davis, plane designer and builder
- Jim Hall, race car designer and builder using aerodynamics ground effect to produce winning race cars

== Other ==
- Bob Fu, pastor
- Jessica McClure, "Baby Jessica"
- Jack Monk Sr., Adrian Monk's father from the television series Monk (fictional)
- Kathleen Zellner, attorney
