= Meg Harris =

Australian swimmer (born 2002)

Meg Harris OAM
Personal information
- Nationality: Australian
- Born: 7 March 2002 (age 24) Wodonga, Victoria, Australia
- Height: 1.80 m (5 ft 11 in)

Sport
- Sport: Swimming
- Strokes: Freestyle
- Club: Rackley
- Coach: Damien Jones
Medal record
Women's swimming
Representing Australia
Event	1st	2nd	3rd
Olympic Games	2	2	1
World Championships (LC)	6	2	1
World Championships (SC)	2	4	0
Commonwealth Games	7	1	0
Pan Pacific Championships	1	3	1
World Junior Championships	0	1	2
Commonwealth Youth Games	1	0	0
Total	19	13	5
Olympic Games
Gold medal – first place	2020 Tokyo	4×100 m freestyle
Gold medal – first place	2024 Paris	4×100 m freestyle
Silver medal – second place	2024 Paris	50 m freestyle
Silver medal – second place	2024 Paris	4×100 m medley
Bronze medal – third place	2020 Tokyo	4×200 m freestyle
World Championships (LC)
Gold medal – first place	2022 Budapest	4×100 m freestyle
Gold medal – first place	2022 Budapest	4×100 m mixed freestyle
Gold medal – first place	2023 Fukuoka	4×100 m freestyle
Gold medal – first place	2023 Fukuoka	4×100 m mixed freestyle
Gold medal – first place	2025 Singapore	50 m freestyle
Gold medal – first place	2025 Singapore	4×100 m freestyle
Silver medal – second place	2022 Budapest	4×100 m mixed medley
Silver medal – second place	2023 Fukuoka	4×100 m medley
Bronze medal – third place	2022 Budapest	50 m freestyle
World Championships (SC)
Gold medal – first place	2022 Melbourne	4×100 m freestyle
Gold medal – first place	2022 Melbourne	4×200 m freestyle
Silver medal – second place	2022 Melbourne	4×50 m freestyle
Silver medal – second place	2022 Melbourne	4×100 m medley
Silver medal – second place	2022 Melbourne	4×50 m mixed freestyle
Silver medal – second place	2024 Budapest	4×100 m freestyle
Commonwealth Games
Gold medal – first place	2022 Birmingham	4×100 m mixed freestyle
Gold medal – first place	2026 Glasgow	50 m freestyle
Gold medal – first place	2026 Glasgow	100 m freestyle
Gold medal – first place	2026 Glasgow	4×100 m freestyle
Gold medal – first place	2026 Glasgow	4×100 m medley
Gold medal – first place	2026 Glasgow	4×100 m mixed freestyle
Gold medal – first place	2026 Glasgow	4×100 m mixed medley
Silver medal – second place	2022 Birmingham	50 m freestyle
Pan Pacific Championships
Gold medal – first place	2026 Irvine	100 m freestyle
Silver medal – second place	2026 Irvine	4×100 m freestyle
Silver medal – second place	2026 Irvine	4×100 m medley
Silver medal – second place	2026 Irvine	4×100 m mixed medley
Bronze medal – third place	2026 Irvine	50 m freestyle
World Junior Championships
Silver medal – second place	2019 Budapest	4×100 m freestyle
Bronze medal – third place	2019 Budapest	50 m freestyle
Bronze medal – third place	2019 Budapest	100 m freestyle
Commonwealth Youth Games
Gold medal – first place	2017 Nassau	50 m freestyle

Meg Harris, OAM (born 7 March 2002) is an Australian swimmer. She is a world record holder in the 4×100 metre freestyle relay. She competed in the 2020 Summer Olympics, where she won a gold medal in the 4×100 metre freestyle relay and a bronze medal in the 4×200 metre freestyle relay and also in the 2024 Summer Olympics, having won a gold medal in the 4×100 metre freestyle relay. Harris also won an individual silver medal at the 2024 Summer Olympics in the 50 m freestyle. She is also the co-founder of the clothing brand Dally&Co Label.

== Background ==
Harris was born in Wodonga and lived in Mackay until she was 13, where she practiced surf lifesaving. She was introduced to swimming by her mother, who worked as a swim teacher.

She attended high school at Mt St Michael's College in Ashgrove, Brisbane, and swam with St Peters Western Swimming club, coached by Dean Boxall.

== Career ==
=== 2020 Olympics ===
During the 2020 Summer Olympics in Tokyo, Harris swam the second leg for the gold medal-winning Australian Women's 4 × 100 metre freestyle relay team in the final. The Australian women broke the world record with a time of 3:29.69. Harris's split was 53.09. She also swam the heats of the 4 × 200 metre freestyle relay with a split of 1:57.01. Harris did not swim in the final where the Australians finished third, but received a bronze medal for swimming in the heats of the relay.

After the Olympics Harris moved from Brisbane to Adelaide, where she came under the tutelage of noted sprint coach Peter Bishop.

=== 2022 ===
In January 2022, Harris broke her arm and announced the injury on Instagram. Harris later announced the injury was not training related and she attained the broken arm when she accidentally ran a scooter into a rock.

In the 2022 Australia Day Honours, Harris was awarded a Medal of the Order of Australia.

=== 2023 ===
At the 2023 World Aquatics Championships, Harris swam the third leg in the Australia women’s 4x100m freestyle relay along with Shayna Jack, Mollie O’Callaghan and Emma McKeon to break the world record in a time of 3:27.96. The previous record also by an Australian team was 3:29.69. Harris also won another gold medal as an heat swimmer in the mixed 4x100m freestyle relay and silver medal as a heat swimmer in the women’s 4x100m medley relay.

In August Harris announced she would move from the South Australia Sports Institute (SASI) to join the Rackley Swim Team in Brisbane under Damien Jones.

=== 2024 Olympics ===
Harris was again a members of the winning 4×100 metre freestyle relay team, anchoring them in the final. She also swam in the heats of the 4x100 metre medley relay, earning a silver medal.

Harris won her first individual silver medal in the 50 m freestyle.

=== 2025 ===
At the 2025 World Aquatics Championships Harris won individual gold in the 50m free as well as swimming second leg in the winning 4x100m freestyle relay.

== Personal life ==
Harris has moderate hearing loss in both ears, possibly as a result of a virus when she was young, and uses hearing aids in daily life. She's commented that you "don't need to be able to hear to swim", however she had to practice listening for the starting gun as a young swimmer.

== Personal best times ==
=== Long course metres ===
Event	Time	Meet	Location	Date	Note(s)
50 m freestyle	23.97	2024 Olympics	Paris, France	4 August 2024	
100 m freestyle	52.52	2024 Australian Swimming Trials	Brisbane	14 June 2024	
200 m freestyle	1:55.97	2025 Queensland Championships	Brisbane	14 June 2021	
50 m backstroke	31.31	2020 Queensland Championships	Brisbane	16 December 2020	
50 m butterfly	26.63	2023 Australian Swimming Championships	Gold Coast	19 April 2023	
100 m butterfly	59.27	2023 Australian Swimming Trials	Adelaide	13 June 2023	
200 m individual medley	2:23.33	2023 South Australian Championships	Adelaide	22 January 2023	

Legend: AM – Americas record; e – equalled existing record; NR – American record; US – US Open record;
Records not set in finals: h – heat; sf – semifinal; r – relay 1st leg; rh – relay heat 1st leg; b – B final; † – en route to final mark; so – swim-off; tt – time trial

=== Short course metres ===
Event	Time		Meet	Location	Date	Note(s)
50 m freestyle	23.73		2022 Short Course World Championships	Melbourne	17 December 2022	
50 m freestyle	23.73		2024 Short Course World Championships	Budapest, Hungary	15 December 2024	
100 m freestyle	52.11	r	2022 Short Course World Championships	Melbourne	13 December 2022	
200 m freestyle	1:58.70		2022 World Cup	Indianapolis, United States	4 November 2022	
50 m butterfly	26.48		2022 World Cup	Berlin, Germany	22 October 2022	
100 m butterfly	1:02.45		2020 Queensland Short Course World Championships	Brisbane	26 September 2020	

== World records ==
=== Long course metres ===
No.	Event	Time	Meet	Location	Date	Status	Ref
1	4x100 m freestyle relay ^{[a]}	3:29.69	2020 Summer Olympics	Tokyo, Japan	25 July 2021	Former	
2	4x100 m freestyle relay ^{[b]}	3:27.96	2023 World Aquatics Championships	Fukuoka, Japan	23 July 2023	Current	

^{a} split 53.09 (2nd leg); with Bronte Campbell (1st leg), Emma McKeon (3rd leg), Cate Campbell (4th leg)
^{b} split 52.29 (3rd leg); with Mollie O'Callaghan (1st leg), Shayna Jack (2nd leg), Emma McKeon (4th leg)

=== Short course metres ===
No.	Event	Time	Meet	Location	Date	Status	Ref
1	4x100 m freestyle relay^{[a]}	3:25.43	2022 World Championships (25 m)	Melbourne, Australia	13 December 2022	Former	

^{a} split 52.00 (3rd leg); with Mollie O'Callaghan (1st leg), Madison Wilson (2nd leg), Emma McKeon (4th leg)

== Olympic records ==
=== Long course metres ===
No.	Event	Time	Meet	Location	Date	Age	Status	Notes	Ref
1	4x100 m freestyle relay ^{[a]}	3:29.69	2020 Summer Olympics	Tokyo, Japan	25 July 2021	19	Former	Former WR, OC, NR	
2	4x100 m freestyle relay (2)^{[b]}	3:28.92	2024 Summer Olympics	Paris, France	27 July 2024	22	Current		

Legend: WR – World record; OC – Oceanian record; NR – Australian record; e – equalled existing record;
Records not set in finals: h – heat; sf – semifinal; r – relay 1st leg; rh – relay heat 1st leg; b – B final; † – en route to final mark; so – swim-off; tt – time trial

^{a} split 53.09 (2nd leg); with Bronte Campbell (1st leg), Emma McKeon (3rd leg), Cate Campbell (4th leg)
^{b} split 51.94 (4th leg) with Mollie O'Callaghan (1st leg), Shayna Jack (2nd leg), Emma McKeon (3rd leg)

== See also ==
- List of Olympic medalists in swimming (women)
- World record progression 4 × 100 metres freestyle relay
