= 2022 FINA World Swimming Championships (25 m) – Women's 4 × 50 metre freestyle relay =

Swimming competition

Women's 4 × 50 metre freestyle relay at the 2022 FINA World Swimming Championships (25 m)
- Venue: Melbourne Sports and Aquatic Centre
- Location: Melbourne, Australia
- Dates: 15 December (heats and finals)
- Competitors: 57 from 12 nations
- Teams: 12
- Winning time: 1:33.89 CR

Medalists
gold medal	Torri Huske; Claire Curzan; Erika Brown; Kate Douglass; Erin Gemmell; Natalie Hinds; Alexandra Walsh	United States
silver medal	Meg Harris; Madison Wilson; Mollie O'Callaghan; Emma McKeon; Alexandria Perkins; Brittany Castelluzzo	Australia
bronze medal	Kim Busch; Maaike de Waard; Kira Toussaint; Valerie van Roon; Tessa Vermeulen	Netherlands

The Women's 4 × 50 metre freestyle relay competition of the 2022 FINA World Swimming Championships (25 m) was held on 15 December 2022.

== Records ==
Prior to the competition, the existing world and championship records were as follows.

World record	Netherlands (NED)	1:32.50	Eindhoven, Netherlands	12 December 2020
Competition record	United States (USA)	1:34.03	Hangzhou, China	16 December 2018

The following new records were set during this competition:

Date	Event	Name	Nation	Time	Record
15 December	Final	Torri Huske (24.08); Claire Curzan (23.30); Erika Brown (23.74); Kate Douglass (22.77)	United States	1:33.89	CR

== Results ==
=== Heats ===
The heats were started at 12:52.

Rank	Heat	Lane	Nation	Swimmers	Time	Notes
1	1	5	China	Zhang Yufei (23.76) NR; Liu Shuhan (24.06); Cheng Yujie (24.10); Yang Junxuan (24.16)	1:36.08	Q
2	1	2	Australia	Meg Harris (23.85); Alexandria Perkins (24.10); Brittany Castelluzzo (24.29); Mollie O'Callaghan (23.90)	1:36.14	Q, OC
3	1	3	United States	Erika Brown (24.16); Erin Gemmell (24.34); Natalie Hinds (23.92); Alexandra Walsh (23.75)	1:36.17	Q
4	1	4	Netherlands	Kim Busch (24.06); Maaike de Waard (23.65); Valerie van Roon (23.75); Tessa Vermeulen (24.86)	1:36.32	Q
5	1	6	Great Britain	Anna Hopkin (23.99); Isabella Hindley (24.19); Imogen Clark (24.60); Abbie Wood (24.63)	1:37.41	Q
6	1	7	Japan	Yume Jinno (24.76); Miki Takahashi (24.33); Chihiro Igarashi (24.35); Ai Soma (24.30)	1:37.74	Q
7	2	2	Sweden	Sara Junevik (24.30); Sofia Åstedt (24.53); Sophie Hansson (24.52); Hanna Rosvall (24.58)	1:37.93	Q
8	2	3	New Zealand	Helena Gasson (24.99); Rebecca Moynihan (24.10); Emma Godwin (24.38); Erika Fairweather (24.98)	1:38.45	Q, NR
9	2	3	Hong Kong	Sze Hang-yu (24.93); Stephanie Au (24.68); Ho Nam Wai (25.65); Chan Kin Lok (25.10)	1:40.36	
10	2	5	Slovakia	Teresa Ivanová (24.61) NR; Martina Cibulková (25.87); Zora Ripková (25.51); Lillian Slušná (24.79)	1:40.78	NR
11	2	6	South Africa	Caitlin de Lange (24.33) NR; Rebecca Meder (25.14); Emily Visagie (26.08); Milla Drakopoulos (25.25)	1:40.80	AF
12	2	7	Peru	Rafaela Fernandini (25.18) NR; McKenna DeBever (25.20); Maria Fe Muñoz (27.22); Alexia Sotomayor (26.24)	1:43.84	NR

=== Final ===
The final was held at 21:46.

Rank	Lane	Nation	Swimmers	Time	Notes
1st place, gold medalist(s)	3	United States	Torri Huske (24.08); Claire Curzan (23.30); Erika Brown (23.74); Kate Douglass (22.77)	1:33.89	CR, AM
2nd place, silver medalist(s)	5	Australia	Meg Harris (23.98); Madison Wilson (23.51); Mollie O'Callaghan (24.01); Emma McKeon (22.73)	1:34.23	OC
3rd place, bronze medalist(s)	6	Netherlands	Kim Busch (24.20); Maaike de Waard (23.47); Kira Toussaint (24.01); Valerie van Roon (23.68)	1:35.36	
4	1	Sweden	Sara Junevik (24.13); Michelle Coleman (23.28); Louise Hansson (23.78); Sophie Hansson (24.49)	1:35.68	
5	4	China	Yang Junxuan (24.24); Cheng Yujie (23.67); Liu Shuhan (24.06); Wang Yichun (24.15)	1:36.12	
6	2	Great Britain	Anna Hopkin (23.94); Isabella Hindley (24.37); Imogen Clark (24.18); Abbie Wood (24.62)	1:37.11	
7	7	Japan	Chihiro Igarashi (24.54); Miki Takahashi (24.43); Yume Jinno (24.47); Ai Soma (23.98)	1:37.42	
8	8	New Zealand	Helena Gasson (24.82); Rebecca Moynihan (24.13); Emma Godwin (24.40); Erika Fairweather (24.58)	1:37.93	NR
