= 2022 FINA World Swimming Championships (25 m) – Women's 4 × 200 metre freestyle relay =

Swimming competition

Women's 4 × 200 metre freestyle relay at the 2022 FINA World Swimming Championships (25 m)
- Venue: Melbourne Sports and Aquatic Centre
- Location: Melbourne, Australia
- Dates: 14 December (heats and finals)
- Competitors: 51 from 11 nations
- Teams: 11
- Winning time: 7:30.87 WR

Medalists
gold medal	Madison Wilson; Mollie O'Callaghan; Leah Neale; Lani Pallister; Meg Harris; Brittany Castelluzzo; Laura Taylor	Australia
silver medal	Rebecca Smith; Katerine Savard; Mary-Sophie Harvey; Taylor Ruck; Sydney Pickrem; Kelsey Wog	Canada
bronze medal	Alexandra Walsh; Hali Flickinger; Erin Gemmell; Leah Smith; Erika Brown; Jillian Cox	United States

The Women's 4 × 200 metre freestyle relay competition of the 2022 FINA World Swimming Championships (25 m) was held on 14 December 2022.

== Records ==
Prior to the competition, the existing world and championship records were as follows.

World record	Netherlands (NED)	7:32.85	Doha, Qatar	3 December 2014
Competition record	Netherlands (NED)	7:32.85	Doha, Qatar	3 December 2014

The following new records were set during this competition:

Date	Event	Name	Nation	Time	Record
14 December	Final	Madison Wilson (1:53.13); Mollie O'Callaghan (1:52.83); Leah Neale (1:52.67); Lani Pallister (1:52.24)	Australia	7:30.87	WR, CR

== Results ==
=== Heats ===
The heats were started at 13:10.

Rank	Heat	Lane	Nation	Swimmers	Time	Notes
1	1	4	United States	Erika Brown (1:56.61); Hali Flickinger (1:54.39); Jillian Cox (1:56.03); Leah Smith (1:55.88)	7:42.91	Q
2	2	5	Australia	Leah Neale (1:55.85); Meg Harris (1:54.26); Brittany Castelluzzo (1:56.17); Laura Taylor (1:58.49)	7:44.77	Q
3	1	3	Netherlands	Tessa Vermeulen (1:56.89); Imani de Jong (1:58.05); Silke Holkenborg (1:55.63); Marrit Steenbergen (1:55.16)	7:45.73	Q
4	1	5	China	Wu Qingfeng (1:57.89); Cheng Yujie (1:57.99); Liu Yaxin (1:53.90); Zhang Yifan (1:56.10)	7:45.88	Q
5	2	4	Canada	Mary-Sophie Harvey (1:55.58); Sydney Pickrem (1:57.07); Kelsey Wog (1:56.18); Rebecca Smith (1:57.87)	7:46.70	Q
6	2	3	Brazil	Stephanie Balduccini (1:56.55); Giovanna Diamante (1:56.79); Gabrielle Roncatto (1:56.57); Aline Rodrigues (1:58.51)	7:48.42	Q, SA
7	1	6	Japan	Chihiro Igarashi (1:57.05); Miyu Namba (1:56.81); Waka Kobori (1:56.69); Rio Shirai (1:59.21)	7:49.76	Q
8	2	2	New Zealand	Erika Fairweather (1:54.24) NR; Caitlin Deans (1:57.54); Summer Osborne (1:59.58); Ruby Heath (1:59.37)	7:50.73	Q, NR
9	2	7	Slovakia	Zora Ripková (1:59.78); Tamara Potocká (1:58.68); Teresa Ivanová (2:03.06); Martina Cibulková (2:00.19)	8:01.71	NR
10	1	2	South Africa	Hannah Pearse (2:02.67); Dakota Tucker (2:01.77); Emily Visagie (2:02.74); Rebecca Meder (1:57.67)	8:04.85	
11	2	6	Hong Kong	Ng Lai Wa (2:03.02); Ho Nam Wai (2:00.88); Sze Hang-yu (1:59.03); Lam Hoi Kiu (2:04.57)	8:07.50	

=== Final ===
The final was held at 21:32.

Rank	Lane	Nation	Swimmers	Time	Notes
1st place, gold medalist(s)	5	Australia	Madison Wilson (1:53.13); Mollie O'Callaghan (1:52.83); Leah Neale (1:52.67); Lani Pallister (1:52.24)	7:30.87	WR
2nd place, silver medalist(s)	2	Canada	Rebecca Smith (1:52.15) NR; Katerine Savard (1:54.78); Mary-Sophie Harvey (1:54.81); Taylor Ruck (1:52.73)	7:34.47	
3rd place, bronze medalist(s)	4	United States	Alex Walsh (1:53.90); Hali Flickinger (1:53.48); Erin Gemmell (1:52.23); Leah Smith (1:55.09)	7:34.70	NR
4	3	Netherlands	Tessa Vermeulen (1:56.88); Marrit Steenbergen (1:51.94); Silke Holkenborg (1:56.08); Imani de Jong (1:55.64)	7:40.54	
5	1	Japan	Chihiro Igarashi (1:56.41); Miyu Namba (1:54.70); Waka Kobori (1:56.46); Rio Shirai (1:57.30)	7:44.87	
6	6	China	Liu Yaxin (1:54.62); Wu Qingfeng (1:56.78); Cheng Yujie (1:59.69); Zhang Yifan (1:57.64)	7:48.73	
7	7	Brazil	Stephanie Balduccini (1:58.05); Giovanna Diamante (1:56.59); Gabrielle Roncatto (1:56.46); Aline Rodrigues (1:57.73)	7:48.83	
8	8	New Zealand	Erika Fairweather (1:54.46); Caitlin Deans (1:57.14); Summer Osborne (2:00.72); Ruby Heath (1:58.44)	7:50.76	
