= Max Muncy =

American baseball player (born 1990)

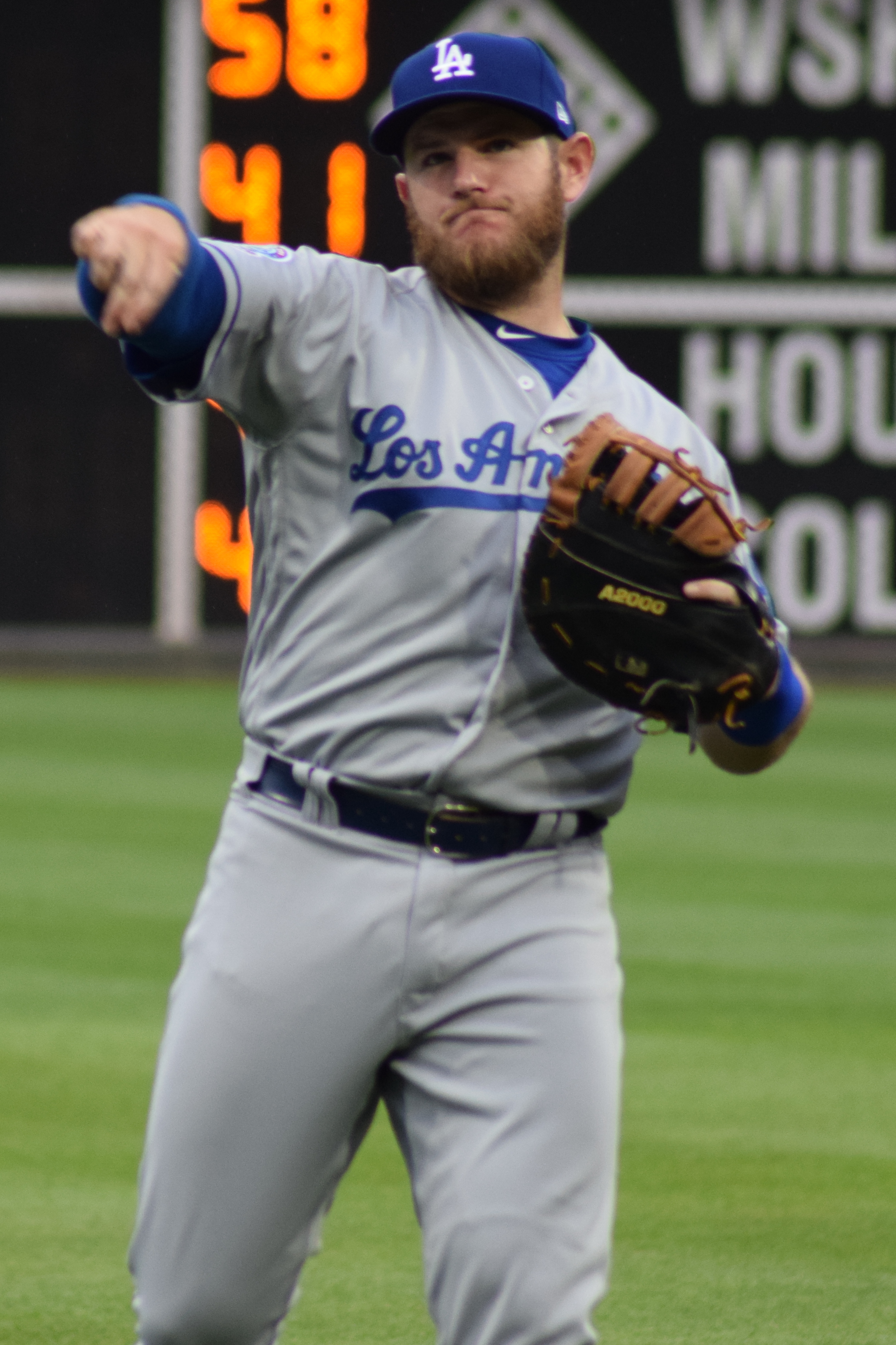
- Muncy with the Los Angeles Dodgers in 2018

Los Angeles Dodgers – No. 13
- Infielder
- Born: August 25, 1990 (age 36); Midland, Texas, U.S.
- Bats: Left Throws: Right

MLB debut
- April 25, 2015, for the Oakland Athletics

MLB statistics (through 2026 season)
- Batting average: .232
- Home runs: 243
- Runs batted in: 680
- Stats at Baseball Reference

Teams
- Oakland Athletics (2015–2016); Los Angeles Dodgers (2018–present)

Career highlights and awards
- 3× All-Star (2019, 2021, 2026); 3× World Series champion (2020, 2024, 2025)

Maxwell Steven Muncy (born August 25, 1990) is an American professional baseball infielder for the Los Angeles Dodgers of Major League Baseball (MLB). He played college baseball for the Baylor Bears. He was selected by the Oakland Athletics in the fifth round of the 2012 Major League Baseball draft. He played in MLB for the Athletics in 2015 and 2016 and later joined the Dodgers in 2018, winning the World Series with the team in 2020, 2024, and 2025. Muncy is a three-time All-Star.

== Career ==
=== Amateur career ===
Muncy attended Keller High School in Keller, Texas. The Cleveland Indians selected him in the 41st round of the 2009 Major League Baseball draft.

He did not sign with Cleveland and attended Baylor University. He played college baseball for the Baylor Bears from 2010 to 2012, and also played collegiate summer baseball for the Wareham Gatemen of the Cape Cod Baseball League in 2010 and 2011. In his three years at Baylor, Muncy had a .311 batting average with 27 home runs. He was twice chosen to the All-Big 12 Conference team.

=== Oakland Athletics ===
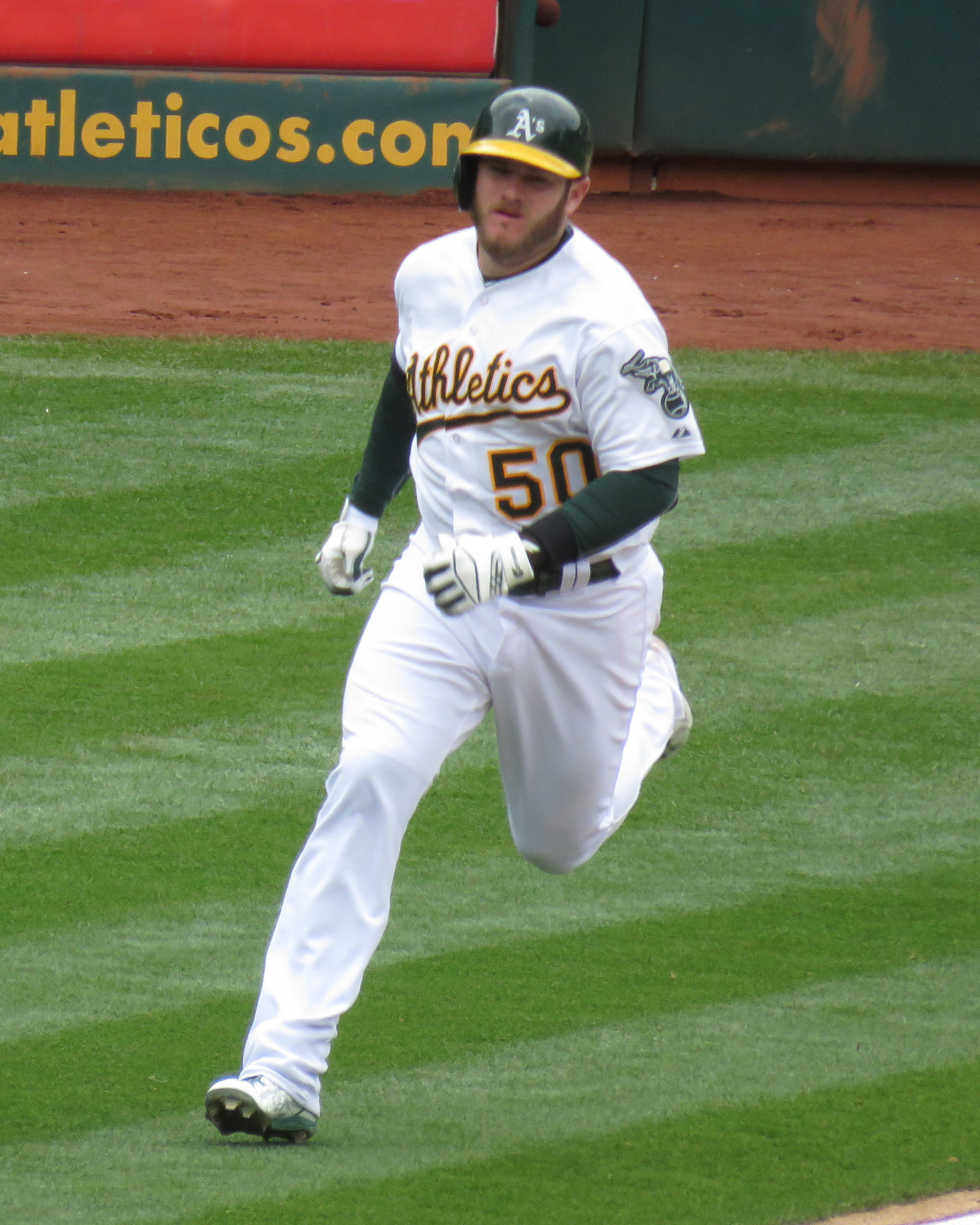
Muncy with the Oakland Athletics in 2015

The Oakland Athletics selected Muncy in the fifth round of the 2012 Major League Baseball draft. He made his professional debut with the Burlington Bees of the Single-A Midwest League, hitting .275 with four home runs in 64 games. He started the 2013 season with the Stockton Ports of the High-A California League before being promoted to the Midland RockHounds of the Double-A Texas League. At the time of his promotion he was leading the California League with 21 home runs and 76 runs batted in (RBIs). In total, Muncy hit .273 with 25 home runs and 100 RBIs. After the season, he played for the Mesa Solar Sox of the Arizona Fall League. He returned to Midland in 2014, where he hit .264 in 122 games.

Muncy began the 2015 season with the Nashville Sounds of the Triple-A Pacific Coast League (PCL), hitting .274 in 60 games. He was promoted to the major leagues on April 25 after an injury to second baseman Ben Zobrist. He made his debut as the starting third baseman against the Houston Astros and had one hit (a seventh inning single to center field off Scott Feldman) in four at-bats. On May 17, he hit his first major league home run off of Chicago White Sox pitcher Jeff Samardzija. He batted .206 in 45 games for Oakland in 2015 and split the 2016 season between Nashville and Oakland, batting .186 in 51 major league games and .251 in 64 minor league games.

During the 2015–16 offseason, Muncy played winter ball for the Charros de Jalisco of the Mexican Pacific Winter League in Guadalajara. He appeared in seven games, recording 27 plate appearances and 25 at-bats, with six runs scored, eight hits, one home run, two runs batted in, and a .320 batting average. His on-base percentage was .370, slugging percentage .480, and OPS .850.

On January 3, 2017, Muncy was designated for assignment, cleared waivers and was sent outright to Nashville on January 10. The Athletics released him towards the end of spring training on April 3.

=== Los Angeles Dodgers ===
Muncy signed a minor league contract with the Los Angeles Dodgers on April 27, 2017, and the organization assigned him to the Oklahoma City Dodgers of the PCL. In 109 games, he hit .309 with 12 homers and 44 RBIs.

==== 2018: Breakout season ====
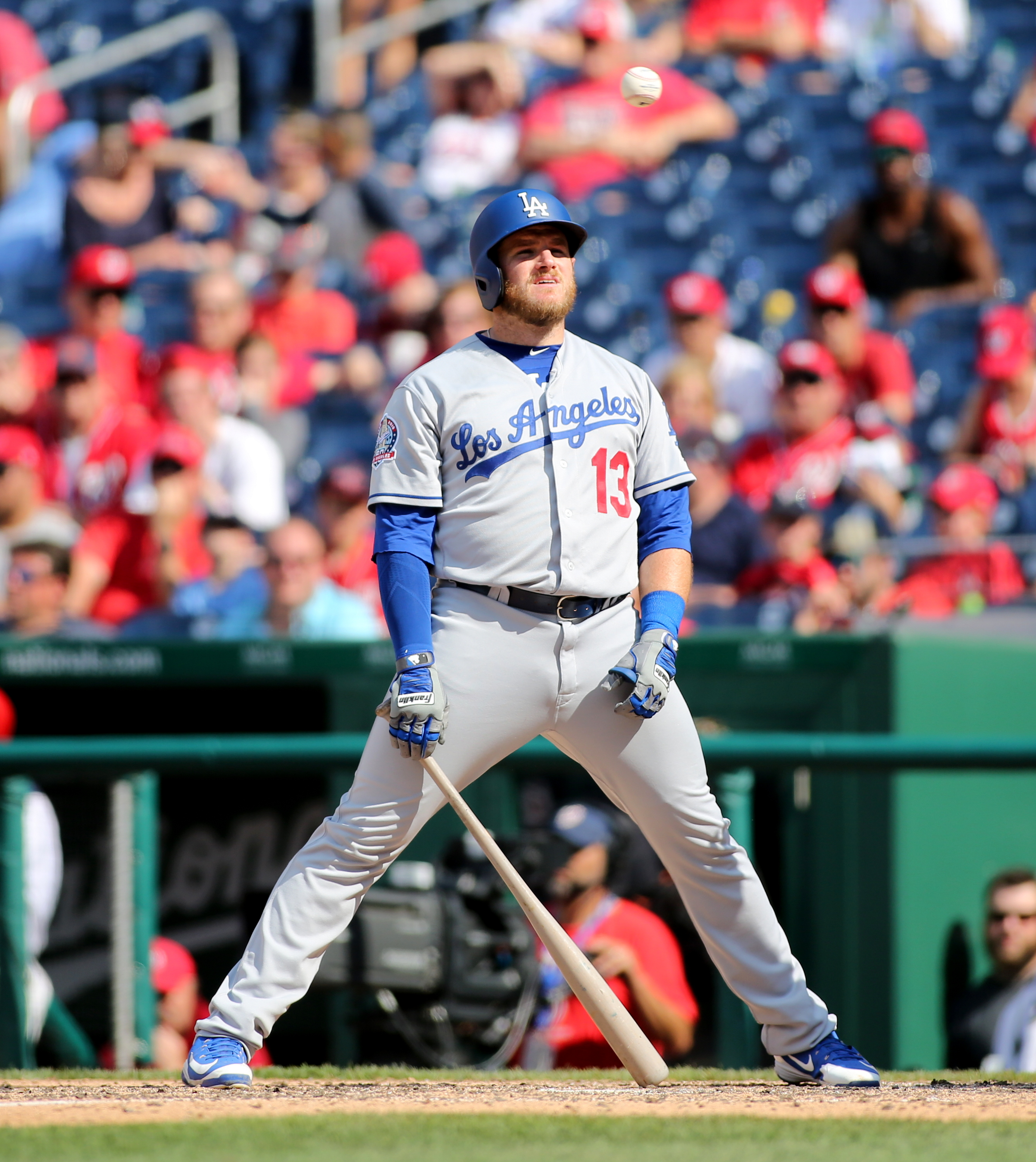
Muncy with the Dodgers in 2018

Muncy was called up to the Dodgers on April 17, 2018. He hit his 20th home run for the Dodgers in his 183rd at bat, setting a franchise record. Muncy was chosen as a candidate for the All-Star Final Vote for the 2018 MLB All-Star Game, but he finished in third place in the voting. He also accepted an offer to participate in the Home Run Derby during the All-Star break. After beating Javier Báez in the first round of the Derby, he lost to eventual champion Bryce Harper in the semifinals.

Muncy batted .263 and led the Dodgers in home runs and was fifth in the National League with 35. He was second in runs batted in for the Dodgers with 79, despite only playing in 137 games. Muncy also exhibited his versatility as he started games at first base (58), third base (30), and second base (13) and also played six games in the outfield. In the playoffs, he hit only .182 in both the Division Series and the National League Championship Series, though he did hit two home runs in the Division Series against the Atlanta Braves.

In the third game of 2018 World Series against the Boston Red Sox, Muncy scored the tying run in the 13th inning and then hit a walk-off home run in the 18th, concluding the longest game in World Series history after seven hours and 20 minutes. In the five games of the series, he hit .235 (four hits in 17 at-bats) with the one home run.

==== 2019: First all-star appearance ====
In 2019, Muncy was selected to the 2019 Major League Baseball All-Star Game as an injury replacement, his first all-star appearance, replacing Washington Nationals third baseman Anthony Rendon. On August 30, 2019, Muncy was placed on injured list with a wrist fracture. He finished the 2019 regular season, playing in 142 games, hitting .251/.374/.515 with 35 home runs (for the second season in a row) and a career-high 98 RBIs. Muncy also received two MVP votes.

==== 2020: First World Series championship ====
On February 6, 2020, the Dodgers and Muncy agreed to a three-year, $26 million contract extension with a $13 million option for a fourth year. The 2020 season was delayed due to the COVID-19 pandemic in North America. Muncy played in 58 of the Dodgers' 60 games and hit .192/.331/.389 with 12 homers and 27 RBIs. In Game 3 of the 2020 NLCS, Muncy hit a grand slam off of Grant Dayton, capping off scoring 11 runs in the first inning. Eventually, the Dodgers broke the record in that game hitting 5 home runs. They won 15–3 as they won the NLCS in seven games against the Atlanta Braves before advancing to the World Series for the third time in four years. In the 2020 World Series, he batted .318 with one home run and six RBIs and helped the Dodgers win the championship.

==== 2021: 100 career home runs and second all-star appearance ====
On May 30, 2021, Muncy hit his 100th career home run off of Zack Littell of the San Francisco Giants. In July, he was selected to represent the Dodgers at the All-Star Game. Muncy finished the 2021 season batting .249/.368/.527 with 36 home runs and 94 RBIs. In the final game of the regular season, Muncy dislocated his elbow when Jace Peterson of the Milwaukee Brewers collided with his arm while he was attempting to field the ball at first base, making him unavailable for the playoffs.

==== 2022 ====
Muncy played in 136 games in 2022, with most of his starts at third base after the team acquired Freddie Freeman to play first. He hit a career-low .196 with 21 homers and 69 RBIs. On August 22, 2022, he signed a one-year contract extension worth $13.5 million for the 2023 season, which also included a $10 million club option for 2024, with incentives. In the 2022 NLDS, Muncy had four hits including a home run in 14 at-bats.

==== 2023 ====
Muncy remained the primary third baseman in 2023, playing in 135 games with a .212 batting average, 36 homers and a career-high 105 RBI. He had 11 at-bats in three games as the Dodgers were swept in the 2023 NLDS by the Arizona Diamondbacks, recording only two hits. After the season, Muncy signed a two-year, $24 million contract extension with the Dodgers that also contained a $10 million club option for 2026.

==== 2024: Second World Series championship ====
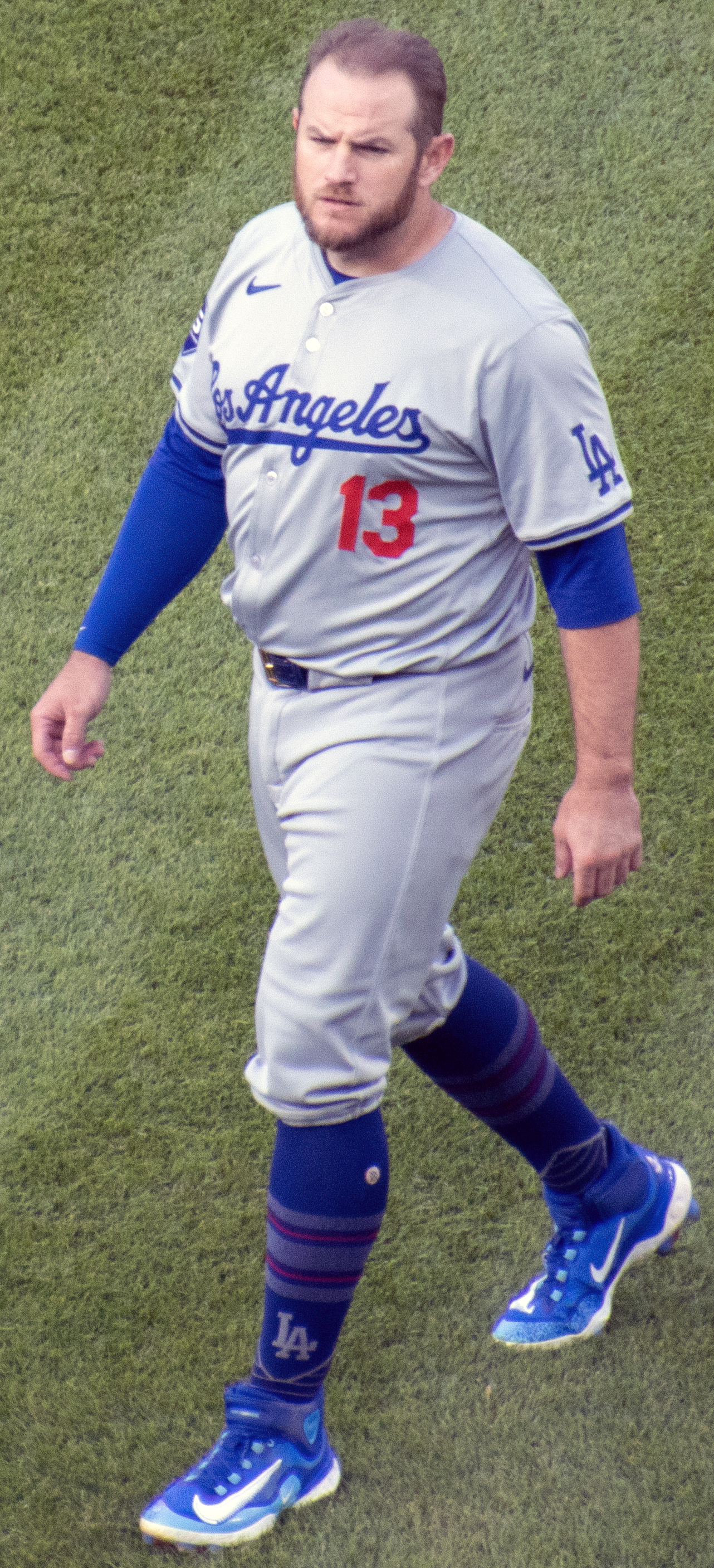
Muncy in April 2024

On May 5, 2024, Muncy had four hits, including a career-high three home runs against the Atlanta Braves. He was placed on the injured list with an oblique strain on May 17, and was transferred to the 60–day injured list following a setback on June 21. Muncy made his return on August 19 against the Seattle Mariners, hitting a two-run home run in the game. In 73 games, he batted .232 with 15 home runs and 48 RBI. Muncy had three hits (including a home run) in 18 at-bats in the 2024 NLDS.

In Game 3 of the 2024 NLCS against the New York Mets, Muncy hit his 13th career post-season homerun, tying the Dodgers franchise record (previously set by Justin Turner and Corey Seager). He also reached base all five times he came to bat in the game, with three walks, a single and the homer, becoming the fourth player in franchise history to accomplish that after Gil Hodges (Game 2 of the 1956 World Series), Manny Ramirez (Game 4 of the 2008 NLCS) and Will Smith (Game 3 of the 2020 NLDS). He reached base his first four at-bats in Game 4 as well, extending his on base streak to 12 straight appearances, a record for a single playoff series and tied with Reggie Jackson for overall playoff appearances. He hit .333 in the series, with two home runs, four RBI, and 11 walks. However, his success did not carry over to the 2024 World Series, where he was hitless in 16 at-bats with 10 strikeouts and only three walks. Despite the hitting slump, the Dodgers won the series over the New York Yankees in five games, giving Muncy his second World Series championship.

==== 2025: Third World Series championship ====
After playing in the 2025 Tokyo Series, Muncy became the fourth player in MLB history with a hit in five different countries, having played in the United States, Mexico, South Korea, Canada, and Japan. He joined Edgardo Alfonzo, Paul Goldschmidt, and Xander Bogaerts as the only players to achieve this feat. Following an early-season hitting slump, he notably switched to wearing glasses, after which his hitting improved. On May 31, he hit his 200th career home run off pitcher Will Warren of the Yankees. On June 22, Muncy hit his 200th home run as a Dodger, a grand slam home run in the sixth inning against the Nationals. That game was Muncy's 898th game with the Dodgers, and his 3,633 plate appearances are the fewest to reach 200 home runs in franchise history. On July 2, Muncy left a game against the Chicago White Sox with a left knee injury after a collision with Michael A. Taylor, who was trying to steal third. The following day, it was announced that he had suffered a bone bruise in his left knee and would be sidelined for about six weeks. He returned after only four weeks only to go back on to the injured list on August 12 with a grade 1 right oblique strain. Muncy rejoined the Dodgers on September 8 only to suffer a bone bruise as a result of being hit by a pitch on September 20, which sidelined him for the last few games of the regular season. On the season, he played in 100 games, with a slash line of .243/.376/.470, 19 home runs, and 67 RBI. Muncy had one hit in seven at-bats in the Wild Card Series and then four hits in nine at-bats in the 2025 NLDS. Muncy hit his 14th career postseason home run in the second game of the 2025 NLCS against the Brewers, setting a new franchise record. It was the only hit in 12 at-bats he had in the series.

In the 2025 World Series, Muncy hit two key homeruns, one in Game 2 and then another one in the deciding seventh game, to cut the Dodgers deficit at the time to one run. He had six hits in 28 at-bats in the series and walked four times as the Dodgers defeated the Toronto Blue Jays to repeat as champions and give Muncy his third-career championship. After the season, the Dodgers picked up his club option for the 2026 season.

==== 2026 ====
On February 12, 2026, the Dodgers signed Muncy to a one-year, $7 million contract extension for the 2027 season that also included a $10 million club option for 2028 (with a $3 million buy out).

On April 10, Muncy hit three home runs, including a walk-off home run in the bottom of the ninth inning to lift the Dodgers to victory over the Texas Rangers. He became the second player in Dodger history to accomplish this feat, joining Don Demeter. On August 13, he hit a three-run home run in the bottom of the sixth inning against the Milwaukee Brewers to break the all-time career home run record at Dodger Stadium with his 131st. For the season, he played in 149 games (the highest single season total of his career) while batting .252 with 29 home runs and 76 RBI.

In the National League Division Series against the Atlanta Braves, Muncy hit three home runs (his only three hits of the series) in 12 at-bats. The three home runs pushed his total postseason home run count to 19, moving him into to a 4-way tie with Corey Seager, Albert Pujols, and Alex Bregman for the 7th most postseason home runs.

== Personal life ==
Muncy and his wife, Kellie, were married in November 2018. They welcomed a daughter in July 2021.

In 2025, Muncy and Kellie partnered with the Los Angeles Dodgers Foundation to host Uncork for a Cause, a charity wine event at the InterContinental Los Angeles Downtown. The fundraiser supported the Dodgers Foundation and the YMCA of the Foothills’ wildfire relief programs.

Muncy has also taken part in Dodgers Foundation community outreach events, including reading sessions at Gabriella Charter School in Los Angeles to promote youth literacy and education initiatives.

== See also ==
- List of Baylor University people
- List of people from Midland, Texas
