= Swimming at the 2022 World Aquatics Championships – Women's 4 × 100 metre medley relay =

Women's 4 × 100 metre medley relay at the 2022 World Aquatics Championships
- Venue: Danube Arena
- Location: Budapest, Hungary
- Dates: 25 June (heats and final)
- Competitors: 59 from 12 nations
- Teams: 12
- Winning time: 3:53.78

Medalists
gold medal	Regan Smith; Lilly King; Torri Huske; Claire Curzan; Rhyan White; Alexandra Walsh; Natalie Hinds; Erika Brown	United States
silver medal	Kaylee McKeown; Jenna Strauch; Brianna Throssell; Mollie O'Callaghan; Madison Wilson	Australia
bronze medal	Kylie Masse; Rachel Nicol; Maggie Mac Neil; Penny Oleksiak; Ingrid Wilm; Kelsey Wog; Kayla Sanchez	Canada

The Women's 4 × 100 metre medley relay competition at the 2022 World Aquatics Championships was held on 25 June 2022.

== Records ==
Prior to the competition, the existing world and championship records were as follows.

World record	United States	3:50.40	Gwangju, South Korea	28 July 2019
Competition record	United States	3:50.40	Gwangju, South Korea	28 July 2019

== Results ==
=== Heats ===
The heats were started at 09:39.

Rank	Heat	Lane	Nation	Swimmers	Time	Notes
1	2	4	Australia	Kaylee McKeown (59.06); Jenna Strauch (1:07.79); Brianna Throssell (57.29); Madison Wilson (52.63)	3:56.77	Q
2	1	6	Netherlands	Kira Toussaint (59.75); Tes Schouten (1:06.83); Maaike de Waard (57.45); Marrit Steenbergen (53.45)	3:57.48	Q
3	1	3	Sweden	Hanna Rosvall (1:01.05); Sophie Hansson (1:06.94); Louise Hansson (56.71); Sarah Sjöström (53.11)	3:57.81	Q
4	2	5	Canada	Ingrid Wilm (59.54); Kelsey Wog (1:08.26); Maggie Mac Neil (57.23); Kayla Sanchez (53.35)	3:58.38	Q
5	2	6	Italy	Silvia Scalia (1:01.12); Arianna Castiglioni (1:06.29); Elena Di Liddo (57.79); Silvia Di Pietro (54.20)	3:59.40	Q
6	2	3	China	Peng Xuwei (1:00.29); Yu Jingyao (1:07.70); Zhang Yufei (57.47); Yang Junxuan (54.09)	3:59.55	Q
7	1	4	United States	Rhyan White (1:00.12); Alexandra Walsh (1:07.60); Natalie Hinds (58.88); Erika Brown (53.46)	4:00.06	Q
8	2	2	France	Emma Terebo (1:00.77); Adèle Blanchetière (1:08.99); Marie Wattel (57.83); Charlotte Bonnet (53.86)	4:01.45	Q
9	2	1	Israel	Aviv Barzelay (1:01.65); Anastasia Gorbenko (1:07.02); Lea Polonsky (59.42); Daria Golovaty (55.19)	4:03.28	NR
10	1	2	Brazil	Stephanie Balduccini (1:03.43); Jhennifer Conceição (1:07.30); Giovanna Diamante (58.37); Ana Carolina Vieira (55.49)	4:04.59	
11	2	7	South Korea	Lee Eun-ji (1:00.79); Moon Su-a (1:09.56); Jeong So-eun (59.49); Hur Yeon-kyung (55.45)	4:05.29	
–	1	5	Great Britain	Medi Harris (1:00.37); Molly Renshaw; Laura Stephens; Lucy Hope	Disqualified	
–	1	1	Thailand	Did not start		
–	1	7	Greece	Did not start		

=== Final ===
The final was held at 19:38.

Rank	Lane	Nation	Swimmers	Time	Notes
1st place, gold medalist(s)	1	United States	Regan Smith (58.40); Lilly King (1:05.89); Torri Huske (56.67); Claire Curzan (52.82)	3:53.78	
2nd place, silver medalist(s)	4	Australia	Kaylee McKeown (58.77); Jenna Strauch (1:05.99); Brianna Throssell (57.19); Mollie O'Callaghan (52.30)	3:54.25	
3rd place, bronze medalist(s)	6	Canada	Kylie Masse (58.39); Rachel Nicol (1:07.17); Maggie Mac Neil (56.80); Penny Oleksiak (52.65)	3:55.01	
4	3	Sweden	Hanna Rosvall (1:00.72); Sophie Hansson (1:06.20); Louise Hansson (56.38); Sarah Sjöström (52.66)	3:55.96	
5	5	Netherlands	Kira Toussaint (59.80); Tes Schouten (1:06.60); Maaike de Waard (57.39); Marrit Steenbergen (53.45)	3:57.24	
6	7	China	Peng Xuwei (59.96); Tang Qianting (1:06.62); Zhang Yufei (57.64); Yang Junxuan (53.51)	3:57.73	
7	2	Italy	Margherita Panziera (1:00.35); Benedetta Pilato (1:07.00); Elena Di Liddo (57.45); Silvia Di Pietro (54.06)	3:58.86	
8	8	France	Emma Terebo (1:00.58); Adèle Blanchetière (1:08.34); Marie Wattel (57.79); Charlotte Bonnet (53.23)	3:59.94	
