= 2022 FINA World Swimming Championships (25 m) – Women's 4 × 50 metre medley relay =

Swimming competition

Women's 4 × 50-metre medley relay at the 2022 FINA World Swimming Championships (25 m)
- Venue: Melbourne Sports and Aquatic Centre
- Location: Melbourne, Australia
- Dates: 17 December (heats and finals)
- Competitors: 71 from 14 nations
- Teams: 14
- Winning time: 1:42.35 WR

Medalists
gold medal	Mollie O'Callaghan; Chelsea Hodges; Emma McKeon; Madison Wilson; Kaylee McKeown; Jenna Strauch	Australia
silver medal	Claire Curzan; Lilly King; Torri Huske; Kate Douglass; Alex Walsh; Annie Lazor; Erika Brown; Natalie Hinds	United States
bronze medal	Louise Hansson; Klara Thormalm; Sara Junevik; Michelle Coleman; Hanna Rosvall; Sofia Åstedt	Sweden

The Women's 4 × 50-metre medley relay competition of the 2022 FINA World Swimming Championships (25 m) was held on 17 December 2022.

== Records ==
Prior to the competition, the existing world and championship records were as follows.

World record	USA SWE	1:42.38	Hangzhou, China Abu Dhabi, United Arab Emirates	12 December 2018 17 December 2021
Competition record	USA	1:42.38	Hangzhou, China	12 December 2018

The following new records were set during this competition:

Date	Event	Name	Nation	Time	Record
17 December	Final	Mollie O'Callaghan (25.49); Chelsea Hodges (29.11); Emma McKeon (24.43); Madison Wilson (23.32)	Australia	1:42.35	WR

== Results ==
=== Heats ===
The heats were started at 11:05.

Rank	Heat	Lane	Nation	Swimmers	Time	Notes
1	1	8	Australia	Kaylee McKeown (26.42); Jenna Strauch (30.21); Emma McKeon (24.79); Madison Wilson (23.36)	1:44.78	Q, OC
2	2	4	Sweden	Hanna Rosvall (26.49); Klara Thormalm (29.40); Sara Junevik (24.42); Sofia Åstedt (24.52)	1:44.83	Q
3	2	6	France	Analia Pigrée (26.49); Charlotte Bonnet (29.63); Mélanie Henique (25.36); Béryl Gastaldello (23.38)	1:44.86	Q, NR
4	1	1	Japan	Miki Takahashi (26.86); Reona Aoki (29.38); Moe Tsuda (24.73); Yume Jinno (24.44)	1:45.41	Q
5	2	5	Netherlands	Kira Toussaint (26.47); Tes Schouten (29.98); Kim Busch (25.41); Valerie van Roon (24.20)	1:46.06	Q
6	1	5	Canada	Ingrid Wilm (26.10); Rachel Nicol (30.08); Katerine Savard (25.52); Rebecca Smith (24.46)	1:46.16	Q
7	1	4	United States	Alex Walsh (27.18); Annie Lazor (30.14); Erika Brown (25.17); Natalie Hinds (24.09)	1:46.58	Q
8	1	7	Czech Republic	Simona Kubová (26.31); Kristýna Horská (30.82); Barbora Seemanová (25.52); Barbora Janíčková (24.08)	1:46.73	Q
9	2	1	Korea	Kim San-ha (26.67) NR; Moon Su-a (31.18); Kim Seo-yeong (25.83); Hur Yeon-kyung (24.56)	1:48.24	NR
10	2	3	China	Peng Xuwei (27.10); Yang Chang (30.48); Zhang Yifan (26.63); Liu Shuhan (24.11)	1:48.32	
11	2	2	Slovakia	Tamara Potocká (28.37); Andrea Podmaníková (29.79); Lillian Slušná (26.12); Teresa Ivanová (24.23)	1:48.51	NR
12	1	6	Hong Kong	Stephanie Au (27.45); Lam Hoi Kiu (31.68); Chan Kin Lok (27.26); Chang Yujuan (26.22)	1:52.61	
13	2	7	South Africa	Milla Drakopoulos (28.24); Emily Visagie (31.46); Caitlin de Lange (26.87); Hannah Pearse (27.19)	1:53.76	
14	1	2	Peru	Alexia Sotomayor (28.50); McKenna DeBever (32.35); María Fe Muñoz (28.21); Rafaela Fernandini (25.12)	1:54.18	NR
	1	3	Italy		Did not start	
	2	8	Great Britain		Did not start	

=== Final ===
The final was held at 19:35.

Rank	Lane	Nation	Swimmers	Time	Notes
1st place, gold medalist(s)	4	Australia	Mollie O'Callaghan (25.49) OC; Chelsea Hodges (29.11); Emma McKeon (24.43); Madison Wilson (23.32)	1:42.35	WR
2nd place, silver medalist(s)	1	United States	Claire Curzan (25.75); Lilly King (29.00); Torri Huske (24.94); Kate Douglass (22.72)	1:42.41	
3rd place, bronze medalist(s)	5	Sweden	Louise Hansson (25.86); Klara Thormalm (29.34); Sara Junevik (24.06); Michelle Coleman (23.17)	1:42.43	
4	7	Canada	Kylie Masse (25.84); Sydney Pickrem (29.69); Maggie Mac Neil (24.40); Taylor Ruck (23.63)	1:43.56	NR
5	2	Netherlands	Kira Toussaint (26.20); Tes Schouten (29.81); Maaike de Waard (24.39); Marrit Steenbergen (23.32)	1:43.72	
6	3	France	Analia Pigrée (26.30); Charlotte Bonnet (29.64); Mélanie Henique (24.78); Beryl Gastadello (23.24)	1:43.96	NR
7	6	Japan	Miki Takahashi (26.84); Reona Aoki (29.67); Moe Tsuda (24.74); Chihiro Igarashi (24.04)	1:45.29	
8	8	Czech Republic	Simona Kubová (26.40); Kristýna Horská (30.50); Barbora Seemanová (25.43); Barbora Janíčková (24.07)	1:46.40	
