= 2026 NCAA Division I Women's Swimming and Diving Championships =

American college aquatic sports competition

- Host city: Atlanta, Georgia
- Date: March 18–21, 2026
- Venue(s): McAuley Aquatic Center; Georgia Tech

The 2026 NCAA Division I Women's Swimming and Diving Championships took place on March 19–22, 2026 at the 43rd annual NCAA-sanctioned swim meet to determine the team and individual national champions of Division I women's collegiate swimming and diving in the United States.

Georgia Tech hosted the meet at the McAuley Aquatic Center in Atlanta, Georgia.

The University of Virginia won its sixth consecutive title, becoming the first program to achieve the feat.

== Team standings ==
- Note: Top 10 only
- (H) = Hosts
- ^{(DC)} = Defending champions

Rank	Team	Points
1st place, gold medalist(s)	Virginia ^{(DC)}	589.00
2nd place, silver medalist(s)	Stanford	380.50
3rd place, bronze medalist(s)	Texas	376.50
4	California	303.00
5	Tennessee	301.50
6	Michigan	296.00
7	Indiana	258.00
8	Louisville	201.50
9	NC State	196.50
10	Florida	125.50

== Swimming results ==
Full results:

Event	Gold		Silver		Bronze	
50 freestyle	Torri Huske; Stanford	20.66	Sara Curtis; Virginia	20.74	Camille Spink; Tennessee	20.98
100 freestyle	Torri Huske; Stanford	45.17	Anna Moesch; Virginia	45.54	Sara Curtis; Virginia	45.77
200 freestyle	Anna Moesch; Virginia	1:39.23	Liberty Clark; Indiana	1:39.88	Nikolett Pádár; Texas	1:40.78
500 freestyle	Claire Weinstein; California	4:30.09	Jillian Cox; Texas	4:31.56	Kennedi Dobson; Georgia	4:32.24
1650 freestyle	Jillian Cox; Texas	15:32.26	Claire Weinstein; California	15:36.52	Katie Grimes; Virginia	15:42.65
100 backstroke	Claire Curzan; Virginia	48.24; MR	Bella Sims; Michigan Maggie Wanezek; Wisconsin	49.62	Not awarded	
200 backstroke	Claire Curzan; Virginia	1:46.10; MR	Maggie Wanezek; Wisconsin	1:47.73	Erika Pelaez; NC State	1:49.08
100 breaststroke	Eneli Jefimova; NC State	56.30	McKenzie Siroky; Tennessee Anita Bottazzo; Florida	57.00	Not awarded	
200 breaststroke	Lucy Bell; Stanford	2:02.38	Aimee Canny; Virginia	2:03.09	Kaelyn Gridley; Duke	2:05.24
100 butterfly	Torri Huske; Stanford	48.49	Claire Curzan; Virginia	48.55	Alex Shackell; Indiana	49.82
200 butterfly	Campbell Stoll; Texas	1:50.26	Alex Shackell; Indiana	1:50.40	Hannah Bellard; Michigan	1:51.17
200 IM	Lucy Bell; Stanford	1:52.09	Teagan O'Dell; California	1:52.76	Mia West; California	1:52.96
400 IM	Bella Sims; Michigan	3:58.08	Lucy Bell; Stanford	3:58.72	Teagan O'Dell; California	3:59.43
200 freestyle relay	Virginia; Claire Curzan (20.85); Bryn Greenwaldt (21.75); Anna Moesch (20.96); Sara Curtis (20.55)	1:24.11	Stanford; Annam Olasewere (21.56); Torri Huske (20.58); Gigi Johnson (21.44); Lucy Thomas (21.99)	1:25.57	Indiana; Liberty Clark (21.27); Kristina Paegle (21.00); Grace Hoeper (22.05); Alex Shackell (21.35)	1:25.67
400 freestyle relay	Virginia; Claire Curzan (46.62); Madi Mintenko (46.73); Anna Moesch (45.61); Sara Curtis (46.30)	3:05.26; US	Stanford; Annam Olasewere (47.15); Torri Huske (45.83); Gigi Johnson (46.26); Lucy Bell (47.48)	3:06.72	Texas; Eva Okaro (46.55); Lillian Nesty (47.27); Nikolett Pádár (46.54); Erin Gemmell (46.66)	3:07.02
800 freestyle relay	Virginia; Aimee Canny (1:41.68); Madi Mintenko (1:41.43); Bailey Hartman (1:43.07); Anna Moesch (1:39.03)	6:45.21; MR	Texas; Nikolett Pádár (1:40.30); Lillian Nesty (1:41.95); Campbell Chase (1:43.03); Erin Gemmell (1:41.63)	6:46.91	California; Mia West (1:42.31); Claire Weinstein (1:41.44); Teagan O'Dell (1:41.27); Ella Cosgrove (1:42.66)	6:47.68
200 medley relay	Virginia; Sara Curtis (22.73); Emma Weber (26.42); Claire Curzan (21.51); Bryn Greenwaldt (21.01)	1:31.67	Stanford; Torri Huske (22.98); Lucy Thomas (25.88); Gigi Johnson (22.14); Annam Olasewere (21.35) Louisville; Julie Mishler (23.79); Anastasia Gorbenko (25.44); Caroline Larsen (22.41); Julia Dennis (20.71)	1:32.35	Not awarded	
400 medley relay	Virginia; Claire Curzan (49.47); Aimee Canny (56.63); Sara Curtis (48.82); Anna Moesch (45.74)	3:20.66	Tennessee; Jillian Crooks (50.94); McKenzie Siroky (56.97); Mizuki Hirai (50.10); Camille Spink (45.78)	3:23.79	Michigan; Bella Sims (49.79); Letitia Sim (57.58); Brady Kendall (50.23); Steanie Balduccini (46.84)	3:24.44

Legend: US – U.S. Open record; MR – Meet record;

== Diving results ==
Event	Gold		Silver		Bronze	
1 m diving	Chiara Pellacani; Miami (FL)	345.70	Sophie Verzyl; South Carolina	345.45	Bayleigh Cranford; Texas	320.65
3 m diving	Sophie Verzyl; South Carolina	387.90	Desharn Bent-Ashmeil; Tennessee	382.25	Elna Widerstrom; Minnesota	374.35
Platform diving	Ellie Cole; Stanford	399.80; MR	Daryn Wright; Purdue	343.45	Kayleigh Clark; Florida State	333.30

Legend: MR – Meet record;

== See also ==
- List of college swimming and diving teams
