= 2022 FINA World Swimming Championships (25 m) – Women's 4 × 100 metre freestyle relay =

Swimming competition

Women's 4 × 100 metre freestyle relay at the 2022 FINA World Swimming Championships (25 m)
- Venue: Melbourne Sports and Aquatic Centre
- Location: Melbourne, Australia
- Dates: 13 December (heats and finals)
- Competitors: 62 from 14 nations
- Teams: 14
- Winning time: 3:25.43 WR

Medalists
gold medal	Mollie O'Callaghan; Madison Wilson; Meg Harris; Emma McKeon; Leah Neale	Australia
silver medal	Torri Huske; Kate Douglass; Claire Curzan; Erika Brown; Erin Gemmell; Natalie Hinds	United States
bronze medal	Rebecca Smith; Taylor Ruck; Maggie Mac Neil; Katerine Savard; Mary-Sophie Harvey	Canada

The Women's 4 × 100 metre freestyle relay competition of the 2022 FINA World Swimming Championships (25 m) was held on 13 December 2022.

== Records ==
Prior to the competition, the existing world and championship records were as follows.

World record	Netherlands (NED)	3:26.53	Doha, Qatar	5 December 2014
Competition record	Netherlands (NED)	3:26.53	Doha, Qatar	5 December 2014

The following new records were set during this competition:

Date	Event	Name	Nation	Time	Record
13 December	Final	Mollie O'Callaghan (52.19); Madison Wilson (51.28); Meg Harris (52.00); Emma McKeon (49.96)	Australia	3:25.43	WR

== Results ==
=== Heats ===
The heats were started at 13:09.

Rank	Heat	Lane	Nation	Swimmers	Time	Notes
1	2	3	Australia	Meg Harris (52.11); Madison Wilson (51.43); Leah Neale (53.28); Emma McKeon (51.76)	3:28.58	Q, OC
2	1	5	Netherlands	Kim Busch (53.28); Valerie van Roon (53.12); Kira Toussaint (52.30); Marrit Steenbergen (51.72)	3:30.42	Q
3	2	4	Canada	Rebecca Smith (52.75); Katerine Savard (52.90); Mary-Sophie Harvey (53.13); Taylor Ruck (51.91)	3:30.69	Q
4	1	4	United States	Erika Brown (52.83); Erin Gemmell (52.84); Natalie Hinds (52.70); Torri Huske (52.74)	3:31.11	Q
5	1	3	China	Yang Junxuan (52.95); Liu Shuhan (52.94); Wu Qingfeng (52.96); Cheng Yujie (53.20)	3:32.05	Q
6	2	5	Sweden	Sara Junevik (52.79); Sofia Åstedt (53.65); Klara Thormalm (54.50); Michelle Coleman (52.23)	3:33.17	Q
7	2	6	Great Britain	Anna Hopkin (52.12); Isabella Hindley (53.55); Medi Harris (54.56); Abbie Wood (53.23)	3:33.46	Q
8	1	6	Japan	Rio Shirai (53.69); Chihiro Igarashi (52.63); Yume Jinno (53.49); Miki Takahashi (53.83)	3:33.64	Q
9	2	2	Brazil	Giovanna Diamante (53.99); Stephanie Balduccini (53.82); Aline Rodrigues (55.08); Gabrielle Roncatto (55.72)	3:38.61	
10	2	7	Slovakia	Lillian Slušná (55.34); Tamara Potocká (54.46); Zora Ripková (55.62); Teresa Ivanová (53.81)	3:39.23	NR
11	1	7	Hong Kong	Sze Hang-yu (54.12); Stephanie Au (55.15); Chan Kin Lok (55.82); Ho Nam Wai (55.19)	3:40.28	
12	1	1	New Zealand	Emma Godwin (54.56); Rebecca Moynihan (53.29); Hazel Ouwehand (56.54); Summer Osborne (56.08)	3:40.47	
13	1	2	South Africa	Milla Drakopoulos (56.97); Caitlin de Lange (53.33); Emily Visagie (57.08); Rebecca Meder (54.19)	3:41.57	AF
14	2	1	Peru	Rafaela Fernandini (55.43); McKenna DeBever (55.68); Alexia Sotomayor (57.86); María Fe Muñoz (58.25)	3:47.22	NR

=== Final ===
The final was held at 21:22.

Rank	Lane	Nation	Swimmers	Time	Notes
1st place, gold medalist(s)	4	Australia	Mollie O'Callaghan (52.19); Madison Wilson (51.28); Meg Harris (52.00); Emma McKeon (49.96)	3:25.43	WR
2nd place, silver medalist(s)	6	United States	Torri Huske (51.73); Kate Douglass (51.17); Claire Curzan (51.59); Erika Brown (51.80)	3:26.29	AM
3rd place, bronze medalist(s)	3	Canada	Rebecca Smith (52.68); Taylor Ruck (51.49); Maggie Mac Neil (51.11); Katerine Savard (52.78)	3:28.06	NR
4	7	Sweden	Sara Junevik (52.46); Michelle Coleman (51.76); Louise Hansson (52.15); Sofia Åstedt (52.98)	3:29.35	
5	5	Netherlands	Kim Busch (53.37); Kira Toussaint (52.33); Valerie van Roon (52.98); Marrit Steenbergen (50.91)	3:29.59	
6	2	China	Yang Junxuan (53.02); Cheng Yujie (52.51); Wu Qingfeng (52.52); Zhang Yufei (51.91)	3:29.96	
7	1	Great Britain	Anna Hopkin (51.81); Isabella Hindley (53.80); Medi Harris (54.03); Abbie Wood (53.83)	3:33.47	
8	8	Japan	Rio Shirai (53.95 ) Chihiro Igarashi (53.09); Yume Jinno (53.26); Miki Takahashi (54.48)	3:34.78	
