= Erika Connolly =

American swimmer (born 1998)

Personal information
- Born: Erika Jade Brown; August 27, 1998 (age 27) Modesto, California, U.S.
- Height: 5 ft 6 in (168 cm)

Sport
- Sport: Swimming
- Strokes: Freestyle
- College team: University of Tennessee
- Coach: Matt Kredich
Medal record
Women's swimming
Representing the United States
Event	1st	2nd	3rd
Olympic Games	0	2	1
World Championships (LC)	2	0	3
World Championships (SC)	5	3	1
Total	7	5	5
Olympic Games
Silver medal – second place	2020 Tokyo	4×100 m medley
Silver medal – second place	2024 Paris	4×100 m freestyle
Bronze medal – third place	2020 Tokyo	4×100 m freestyle
World Championships (LC)
Gold medal – first place	2022 Budapest	4×100 m medley
Gold medal – first place	2022 Budapest	4×100 m mixed medley
Bronze medal – third place	2022 Budapest	50 m freestyle
Bronze medal – third place	2022 Budapest	4×100 m freestyle
Bronze medal – third place	2022 Budapest	4×100 m mixed freestyle
World Championships (SC)
Gold medal – first place	2018 Hangzhou	4×50 m freestyle
Gold medal – first place	2018 Hangzhou	4×100 m freestyle
Gold medal – first place	2018 Hangzhou	4×50 m medley
Gold medal – first place	2022 Melbourne	4×50 m freestyle
Gold medal – first place	2022 Melbourne	4×100 m medley
Silver medal – second place	2018 Hangzhou	4×200 m freestyle
Silver medal – second place	2022 Melbourne	4×100 m freestyle
Silver medal – second place	2022 Melbourne	4×50 m medley
Bronze medal – third place	2022 Melbourne	4×200 m freestyle

Erika Jade Connolly (née Brown; born August 27, 1998) is a retired American swimmer. She competed at the 2020 Summer Olympics, winning one silver and one bronze medal. Connolly competed again at the 2024 Summer Olympics and won a silver medal.

== Career ==
=== Early career ===
Brown was born in Modesto, California, in 1998. She attended William A. Hough High School in Cornelius, North Carolina. While in high school, she was a four-time North Carolina state champion in swimming, winning twice in the 200 freestyle and 400 freestyle relay events. Brown then started competing for the University of Tennessee swim team in 2016.

=== 2018 ===
At the 2018 NCAA Division I Championships in March, Brown won two silver medals and one bronze medal. She was named Southeastern Conference Swimmer of the Year.

Brown competed at the 2018 World Championships (25 m) in December. She won three gold medals and one silver medal, all on relays.

=== 2019 ===
At the 2019 NCAA Division I Championships in March, Brown won a gold medal and a silver medal. She repeated as SEC Swimmer of the Year.

Brown competed at the 2019 U.S. National Championships in July and August. She won a gold medal in the 50 m freestyle, won a silver medal in the 100 m freestyle, and finished fifth in the 100 m backstroke.

=== 2020 ===
Brown was named SEC Swimmer of the Year for the third straight time in 2020. In May, she graduated from the University of Tennessee with a degree in kinesiology.

=== 2021 ===
Brown competed at the 2020 U.S. Olympic Trials in June and July 2021. She won a silver medal in the 100 m freestyle and qualified for the Olympic team.

Later in July, Brown competed at the 2020 Summer Olympics. She swam in the final of the women's 4 × 100 m freestyle relay and won a bronze medal. She then competed in the 100 m freestyle and made it to the semifinals. In the women's 4 × 100 meter medley relay, Brown swam in the heats, and the American team finished second in the final, earning her a silver medal.

=== 2022 ===
At the 2022 U.S. International Team Trials in April, Brown won a silver medal in the 50 m freestyle and a bronze medal in the 100 m freestyle. She was named to the World Championship team.

In June, Brown married Alec Connolly, a fellow University of Tennessee swimmer.

Later that month, Brown competed at the 2022 World Championships. She won a bronze medal in the 50 m freestyle and also won two gold medals and two bronze medals in relay events.

Brown competed at the 2022 World Championships (25 m) in December. She won two gold medals, two silver medals, and one bronze medal in relay events.

=== 2023 ===
Brown competed at the 2023 U.S. National Championships in June and July. She did not win any medals.

=== 2024 ===
Brown competed at the US Olympic Team Trials in Indianapolis, Indiana. After a series of swim-off's she eventually earned herself a second Olympic berth by way of her 6th place finish in the 100 Freestyle, earning her a spot on the 4 x 100 free relay.

At the 2024 Summer Olympics in Paris, she earned a silver medal by way of her preliminary swim in the 4 x 100 free relay.
