= Torri Huske =

American swimmer (born 2002)

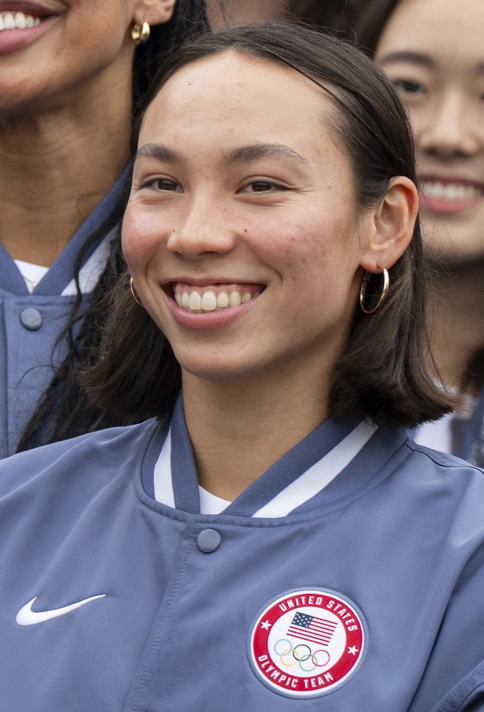
- Huske in 2024

Personal information
- National team: United States
- Born: December 7, 2002 (age 23) Arlington, Virginia, U.S.
- Height: 5 ft 9 in (175 cm)

Sport
- Sport: Swimming
- Strokes: Butterfly, freestyle, individual medley
- Club: Arlington Aquatic Club (AAC)
- College team: Stanford University
- Coach: Greg Meehan (Stanford, current); Evan Stiles (AAC, previous); Torey Ortmayer (Yorktown High School & Strength Coach, previous)
Medal record
Women's swimming
Representing the United States
Event	1st	2nd	3rd
Olympic Games	3	3	0
World Championships (LC)	6	2	6
World Championships (SC)	6	4	0
Pan Pacific Championships	1	0	0
World Junior Championships	5	1	0
Total	21	10	6
Olympic Games
Gold medal – first place	2024 Paris	100 m butterfly
Gold medal – first place	2024 Paris	4×100 m medley
Gold medal – first place	2024 Paris	4×100 m mixed medley
Silver medal – second place	2020 Tokyo	4×100 m medley
Silver medal – second place	2024 Paris	100 m freestyle
Silver medal – second place	2024 Paris	4×100 m freestyle
World Championships (LC)
Gold medal – first place	2022 Budapest	100 m butterfly
Gold medal – first place	2022 Budapest	4×100 m medley
Gold medal – first place	2022 Budapest	4×100 m mixed medley
Gold medal – first place	2023 Fukuoka	4×100 m medley
Gold medal – first place	2025 Singapore	4x100 m mixed freestyle
Gold medal – first place	2025 Singapore	4×100 m medley
Silver medal – second place	2023 Fukuoka	4×100 m freestyle
Silver medal – second place	2025 Singapore	4×100 m freestyle
Bronze medal – third place	2022 Budapest	100 m freestyle
Bronze medal – third place	2022 Budapest	4×100 m freestyle
Bronze medal – third place	2022 Budapest	4×100 m mixed freestyle
Bronze medal – third place	2023 Fukuoka	100 m butterfly
Bronze medal – third place	2023 Fukuoka	4×100 m mixed medley
Bronze medal – third place	2025 Singapore	100 m freestyle
World Championships (SC)
Gold medal – first place	2021 Abu Dhabi	4x100 m freestyle
Gold medal – first place	2021 Abu Dhabi	4×50 m freestyle
Gold medal – first place	2022 Melbourne	50 m butterfly
Gold medal – first place	2022 Melbourne	4×50 m freestyle
Gold medal – first place	2022 Melbourne	4×100 m medley
Gold medal – first place	2022 Melbourne	4×50 m mixed medley
Silver medal – second place	2021 Abu Dhabi	4×200 m freestyle
Silver medal – second place	2022 Melbourne	100 m butterfly
Silver medal – second place	2022 Melbourne	4×100 m freestyle
Silver medal – second place	2022 Melbourne	4×50 m medley
Pan Pacific Championships
Gold medal – first place	2026 Irvine	4×100 m freestyle
World Junior Championships
Gold medal – first place	2019 Budapest	50 m butterfly
Gold medal – first place	2019 Budapest	100 m butterfly
Gold medal – first place	2019 Budapest	4×100 m freestyle
Gold medal – first place	2019 Budapest	4×100 m medley
Gold medal – first place	2019 Budapest	4×100 m mixed medley
Silver medal – second place	2019 Budapest	100 m freestyle
Representing Stanford
NCAA championships
Gold medal – first place	2026 Atlanta	50 m freestyle
Gold medal – first place	2026 Atlanta	100 m freestyle
Gold medal – first place	2026 Atlanta	100 m butterfly
Gold medal – first place	2025 Federal Way	200 m medley
Bronze medal – third place	2022 Atlanta	4×200 freestyle
Silver medal – second place	2026 Atlanta	Team
Silver medal – second place	2026 Atlanta	4×50 m freestyle
Silver medal – second place	2026 Atlanta	4×100 m freestyle
Silver medal – second place	2026 Atlanta	4×50 m medley
Silver medal – second place	2025 Federal Way	Team
Silver medal – second place	2025 Federal Way	100 m freestyle
Silver medal – second place	2025 Federal Way	100 m butterfly
Silver medal – second place	2025 Federal Way	4×50 m medley
Silver medal – second place	2023 Knoxville	100 m freestyle
Silver medal – second place	2023 Knoxville	200 m medley
Silver medal – second place	2023 Knoxville	4×50 m freestyle
Silver medal – second place	2023 Knoxville	4×100 m freestyle
Silver medal – second place	2023 Knoxville	4×200 m freestyle
Silver medal – second place	2022 Atlanta	100 m butterfly
Silver medal – second place	2022 Atlanta	200 m medley
Silver medal – second place	2022 Atlanta	4×100 m freestyle
Bronze medal – third place	2025 Federal Way	4×50 m freestyle
Bronze medal – third place	2023 Knoxville	Team
Bronze medal – third place	2023 Knoxville	100 m butterfly
Bronze medal – third place	2022 Atlanta	Team
Bronze medal – third place	2022 Atlanta	4×100 medley

Victoria Huske (/ˈtɔːriː ˈhʌsk/ TOR-ee HUSK; Chinese given name: 簡愛, pinyin: Jiǎn’ài, born December 7, 2002) is an American competitive swimmer and the reigning Olympic champion in the 100-meter butterfly. She holds world records in two relays: the 4x100-meter medley and 4x100-meter mixed medley. She is the former American record holder in the 50- and 100-meter butterfly.

At 18, she competed at the 2020 Summer Olympics, winning a silver medal in the 4×100-meter medley relay, swimming the butterfly leg of the relay in the final. At the 2022 Fina World Swimming Championships in Budapest, Hungary, Huske won three gold and three bronze medals, joining just three other American women in winning six medals at a World Championships. At the 2024 Summer Olympics, Huske won three gold and two silver medals.

== Early life and education ==
Huske is from Arlington, Virginia. Her mother, Ying, is an IT professional who was an architect in Guangzhou, China, before immigrating to the United States in 1991. Her father, Jim Huske, works as an executive coach and organizational consultant. Torri is an only child. At age six, she began swimming with the Arlington Aquatic Club (AAC).

== Career ==
=== High school (2017–2021) ===
Torri attended Yorktown High School in Arlington, Virginia, from 2017 to 2021. While at high school, she was coached by Torey Ortmayer Her team finished first once (2021), second twice (2018–2020) and third in the Virginia State High School League (VHSL) Class 6 High School Swimming and Diving Championships.

At the VHSL State Championship Meet during her senior year Huske set the national high school record in the 200 Short Course Yards (SCY) Individual Medley (IM) with a time of 1:53.73, shaving a tenth of a second from the record held by Dagney Knutson since 2009. A half-hour later, Huske reclaimed the national high school record in the 100 (SCY) butterfly with a time of 49.95, taking down Claire Curzan's mark of 50.35 from 2020 and becoming the first woman to go under 50 seconds in a high school competition. She also set the 17–18 National Age Group record, breaking the 50.19 mark set by Olivia Bray in 2019.

Ultimately, she set six Virginia State (SCY) records: 50m freestyle, 100m freestyle, 200m freestyle, 100m butterfly, 200m individual medley, and the 4x50 medley relay. She won 15 VHSL Class 6 High School State Championships (eight individual and seven relay).

Huske was named a 2020–2021 high school All-American swimmer by the National Interscholastic Swimming Coaches Association (NISCA) in July 2021. By the end of her high school career, she had been named a 29-time NISCA All-American. In September 2021, USA Swimming named Huske as one of the recipients of Scholastic All-American honors for the 2020–2021 high school season. It was her fourth year receiving the honor.

In 2022, Torri became the youngest member ever inducted into the Yorktown High School Hall of Fame.

=== 2019 ===
At the 2019 US National Championships in Stanford, California, Huske broke the 38-year-old National Age Group record in the 100m butterfly for the girls 15–16 age group with a time of 57.80, 0.13 seconds faster than the previous record set by Mary Meagher in 1981.

==== 2019 World Junior Championships ====
2019 World Junior Championships
Gold medal – first place	4×100 m mixed medley	3:44.84 (WJ, CR)
Gold medal – first place	50 m butterfly	25.70
Gold medal – first place	4×100 m freestyle	3:37.61
Gold medal – first place	100 m butterfly	57.71
Gold medal – first place	4×100 m medley	3:59.13
Silver medal – second place	100 m freestyle	54.54

In August 2019, Huske won six medals at the 2019 World Junior Championships in Budapest, Hungary, five of which were gold medals and one of which was a silver medal. On August 21, Huske won a gold medal in the mixed 4 × 100 m medley relay, swimming the butterfly leg of the relay in 58.04 seconds and helping the relay finish in a new world junior record and Championships record time of 3:44.84. The next day, Huske won a silver medal in the 100m freestyle with a time of 54.54 seconds in the final that was 8-tenths of a second behind gold medalist and fellow American Gretchen Walsh. In the final of the 50-meter butterfly on August 23, Huske finished ahead of American teammate Claire Curzan, who won the bronze medal, to win the gold medal with a time of 25.70 seconds. Huske won her fourth medal of the Championships on August 24 in the 4×100m freestyle relay, splitting a 54.50 for the second leg to help the relay win the gold medal in a time of 3:37.61. On August 25, the final day of the Championships, Huske won the gold medal in the 100m butterfly with a time of 57.71 seconds, breaking her own National Age Group record in the event. For her sixth medal, Huske won a gold medal in the 4×100m medley relay, swimming the butterfly leg of the relay in 57.86 seconds and contributing to the total time of 3:59.13.

The day before she turned sixteen, Huske won LC 100M Butterfly at the Toyota U.S. Open Winter National Championships in Atlanta, GA with a LCM time of 57.48.

Huske's swims throughout the 2019 year earned her the Swammy Award from SwimSwam for "Age Group Swimmer of the Year" for the girls 15–16 age group.

=== 2020 ===
In November 2020, the Toyota US Open National Championships meet took place in nine locations due to COVID-19 and all races were timed finals (no prelims or semi-finals). Finishing times were compiled across all the locations and places were awarded. Huske swam at the Richmond, VA location and across all locations finished 1st in the 100m freestyle with a time of 54.04. In addition, Huske also finished 2nd in the 100m butterfly (57.36), 2nd in the 200m individual medley (2:11.18), 7th in the 200m butterfly (2:14.03), 9th in the 50m free (25.34), and 28th in the 100m backstroke (1:03.25).

Huske committed to swim for Stanford University in June 2020 and started attending in autumn 2021, competing collegiately as part of the Stanford Cardinal.

==== 2020 US Olympic Trials ====
At the 2020 U.S. Olympic Team Trials in Omaha, Nebraska, Huske swam a new Americas record, American record, US Open record, and Championships record time of 55.78 seconds in the 100m butterfly semifinals. Her new American record broke the record of 55.98 seconds set at the 2012 Summer Olympics by Dana Vollmer. The next day, June 14, Huske broke her own Americas, American, US Open, and Championships records from the day before, setting the new records in the final of the 100m butterfly at 55.66 seconds and swimming the third fastest performance in the event to date. Huske qualified for a spot on the 2020 USA Olympic Team, a noted accomplishment considering she was only able to train in a long course meters swimming pool once a week leading up to the Olympic Trials. During the meet Huske swam more races than any other women. In addition to the 100m butterfly, she also placed third in the 50m freestyle with a time of 24.46 and fourth in the 200m individual medley with a time of 2:10.38. Huske also qualified for Semi-Finals in the 100m freestyle (placing 10 overall) and the 200m freestyle (placing 11th overall).

Following her performances at the US Olympic Trials, national newspaper USA Today highlighted Huske as one of their "10 to watch", that is one of ten Olympians, selected from all sports, to keep an eye on during the 2020 Olympic Games.

==== 2020 Summer Olympics ====
2020 Summer Olympics
Silver medal – second place	4×100 m medley relay	3:51.73

On day three of the 2020 Summer Olympics in Tokyo, Japan, and postponed to 2021 due to the COVID-19 pandemic, Huske competed in the 100m butterfly final. The race would end up being the fastest 100m butterfly heat in history. Four of the eight finalists swam times which were ranked in the top ten for a female in the All-time history of the event. Huske finished that 100m butterfly heat in fourth, 1/100 of a second behind bronze medalist Emma McKeon of Australia., and just 14/100ths of a second behind Maggie Macneil who won the gold medal in 55.59.

In the final of the 4 × 100 m mixed medley relay on day eight, Huske and her finals relay teammates of Ryan Murphy, Lydia Jacoby, and Caeleb Dressel placed fifth. On the ninth and final day of competitive swimming at the Olympic Games, Huske competed in the 4×100m medley relay final for Team USA with teammates Regan Smith, Lydia Jacoby, and Abbey Weitzeil. Team USA finished second with a time of 3:51.73, just 0.13 seconds behind Australia's Olympic-record time of 3:51.60, earning Huske a silver medal.

=== 2021 ===
==== 2021–2022 fall collegiate season ====
In mid-August 2021, Huske became the first collegiate swimmer to sign a sponsorship deal, with swimwear company TYR Sport. Huske made her collegiate debut on October 1 in a dual meet against San Jose State University, winning the 500-yard freestyle in a time of 4:51.33 and the 50-yard freestyle with a time of 22.58 seconds for her school, Stanford University. In the second dual meet of her career against Utah in Salt Lake City, Torri finished 2nd in the 200 butterfly to teammate Lillie Nordmann with a time of 2:02.97. Later that meet, she won both the 100 free (50.67) and the 200 individual medley.

On the first day, November 18, of her first collegiate invitational, the 2021 North Carolina State Fall Invitational, Huske won the 200-yard individual medley with a time of 1:52.82, won the 50-yard freestyle in 21.70 seconds, and helped her relay finish second in the 4x50-yard freestyle relay. The next day, Huske helped her relay place second in the 4x50-yard medley relay, won the 100-yard butterfly in 50.30 seconds, and helped her relay win the 4x200-yard freestyle relay event by splitting a 1:42.59 lead-off leg. The third and final day of competition, Huske brought her tally of event wins to six and tally of first or second place finishes to eight by winning the 100-yard freestyle with a time of 47.39 seconds and helping win the 4x100-yard freestyle relay, splitting a 46.27 for the fourth leg of the relay.

==== 2021 World Short Course Championships ====
2021 SC World Championships (25m)
Gold medal – first place	4×100 m freestyle	3:28.52
Gold medal – first place	4×50 m freestyle	1:34.22
Silver medal – second place	4×200 m freestyle	7:36.53

On October 28, Huske was named to the 2021 World Short Course Championships team for the United States in four individual events, while the announcement of the team, including Huske, was ranked by Swimming World as number two for the week's "The Week That Was" honor. She entered to compete in the 100 meter freestyle, 50 meter butterfly, and 100 meter butterfly individual events.

Day one of competition, December 16, Huske anchored the 4 × 100 m freestyle relay in 53.01 seconds in the prelims heats, helping qualify the relay to the final ranked second behind the Netherlands relay team. In the final, Abbey Weitzeil substituted in for Huske and the relay won a gold medal in a time of 3:28.52 with Huske receiving a gold medal for her prelims contributions as well. The next day, Huske finished third in her heat of the prelims in the 100m freestyle with a 53.34 and qualified for the semifinals ranked eighth overall. In the same prelims session, she split a 24.23 on the anchor leg of the 4×50m mixed freestyle relay to help advance it to the final ranked fourth. For the finals relay, Kate Douglass substituted in for Huske and the relay placed fourth. Huske, qualified for the final of the 100m freestyle in the evening, swimming a 52.48 and ranking seventh overall.

The morning of day three, Huske swam in lane seven in prelims heat seven and qualified for the semifinals of the 50 meter butterfly ranking seventh with a 25.43. In the evening, she placed sixth in the final of the 100 meter freestyle in 51.93 seconds. Huske also qualified for the final of the 50 meter butterfly, tying in rank for fifth overall in the semifinals with Arina Surkova of Russia and Claire Curzan at 25.20 seconds. In the final of the 50 meter butterfly on day four Huske placed fourth, finishing less than four-tenths of a second behind bronze medalist and teammate Claire Curzan. The following morning, Huske qualified for the semifinals of the 100 meter butterfly with a 56.59 in the prelims that ranked her fourth overall. In the 4×200 metre freestyle relay, Huske led-off the relay in 1:56.41 to help qualify the relay to the final ranking second. In the evening, Huske swam a 56.13 in the semifinals of the 100 meter butterfly and qualified for the final ranking fourth. She split a 1:54.72 for the first leg of the 4×200 metre freestyle relay in the final, helping win the silver medal in a time of 7:36.53.

The final day of competition, day six, Huske helped qualify the 4×50 meter freestyle relay to the final ranking first with a split of 24.44 for the second leg of the relay in the prelims heats. In her second event of the morning, Huske split a 58.81 for the butterfly leg of the 4×100 meter medley relay, helping qualify the relay for the final ranking fourth. Huske was substituted out on the finals relay for the 4×50 meter freestyle relay in the evening and won a gold medal for her prelims contributions when the finals relay finished first. For the final of the 100 meter butterfly she swam a 55.75 and finished fourth behind teammate and bronze medalist Claire Curzan. In the final of the 4×100 meter medley relay, Claire Curzan substituted in for Huske on the butterfly leg of the relay and the relay placed fourth.

=== 2022 ===
==== 2021–2022 winter collegiate season ====
In January 2022 the Stanford Women's Swim and Dive Team traveled to Arizona for back-to-back meets against Arizona State and Arizona. In the meet against Arizona State on January 21, Huske began the meet by winning the 1,000 freestyle (9:51.06), before also winning the 50 freestyle (22.79) and the 200 individual medley (1:58.16). The next day against Arizona Huske finished 3rd in the 200 free (1:49.07) before swimming exhibition races in the 100 freestyle (49.79) and the 100 butterfly (53.19). Stanford finished January by traveling to Los Angeles, CA for back-to-back meets against U.C.L.A and U.S.C. On January 28, Huske won the 200 butterfly (1:59.22) and the 100 fly (53.19). The following day against U.S.C. Huske finished 2nd in the 200 freestyle (1:45.84), the 100 free (49.06) and the 200 individual medley (1:58.26). Stanford finished up the dual meet season by traveling to Berkeley, CA for a meet against Cal. During the meet Huske won the 50 freestyle (22.28) and the 100 butterfly (51.92).

==== 2022 Pac-12 Championships ====
The first day of the 2022 Pac-12 Conference Championships, Huske helped achieve a first-place finish in the 4×200 yard freestyle relay with a 6:50.21, swimming a personal best time of 1:42.51 for the lead-off leg of the relay. The second day, she won the 200 yard individual medley with a 1:52.42 and helped win the 4×50 yard freestyle relay, splitting a 21.43 for the first 50-yard portion of the relay. In her first event of the third day, Huske won the 100 yard butterfly in 49.43 seconds, finishing 0.44 seconds ahead of second-place finisher Regan Smith. For the 4×100 yard medley relay, her second and final event of the evening's finals session, she helped the Stanford relay team achieve the conference title in the event with a final time of 3:25.54, splitting a 50.28 for the butterfly leg of the relay. Huske achieved her first win of the fourth and final day in the 100 yard freestyle, finishing 0.27 seconds head of the second-place finisher with a time of 47.07 seconds. Her second win of the day was in the 4×100 yard freestyle relay, where she anchored the relay to a first-place finish in 3:09.06 with a 46.72. For her performance during the meet, Huske was named the Swimmer of the Meet by the Pac-12.

==== 2022 NCAA Championships ====
At the 2022 NCAA Championships in Atlanta, Huske started competition on day one with a win in the 4×200 yard freestyle relay, where she helped achieve a new pool record time of 6:48.30 with her split of 1:41.93 for the lead-off leg of the relay. In the morning of day two, she qualified for the final of the 200 yard individual medley ranking second with a time of 1:54.05. For the evening finals session, she achieved a second-place finish in the 200 yard individual medley in 1:51.81 and a sixth-place finish in the 4×50 yard freestyle relay, splitting a 21.76 for the lead-off leg of the relay. The following day, she placed second in the 100 yard butterfly behind only Kate Douglass with a time of 49.17 seconds. In the final of the 4×100 yard medley relay later in the same session, she split a 50.01 for the butterfly leg of the relay to contribute to a third-place finish in 3:25.63. On the final day of competition, she won the b-final of the 100 yard freestyle with a 46.98 and led-off the 4×100 yard freestyle relay in 46.82 seconds to help achieve a second-place finish in 3:08.97.

==== 2022 International Team Trials ====
In late April 2022 the International Team Trials were held in Greensboro, NC to select Team USA for the 2022 Fina LC World Championships to be held in Budapest, Hungary in June. Just a little over three weeks before the meet Huske contracted COVID, forcing her out of the pool, requiring rest, and putting her participation at the Trials at risk. Fortunately, Huske recovered quickly and participated fully at the meet.

On the first day of the competition, Huske began mornings preliminary session by finishing 2nd in the 100M freestyle to Natalie Hinds with a time of 54.16. Later that day in finals, Huske secured a spot on the Team USA's World Championship team by winning the 100M freestyle with a time of 53.35 ahead of Claire Curzan who placed second with a time of 53.58. In prelims on day two of the competition Huske finished 10th in the 200M freestyle with a time of 1:59.14. She also swam prelims in the 50M butterfly where she finished fourth with a time of 25.98. Later that day in finals she finished 2nd in the 50M butterfly with a time of 25.68, just behind Claire Curzan time of 25.49. On the third day of the competition Huske place first in prelims of the 100Mbutterfly with a time of 57.03. In finals, Huske won her second final of the competition by winning the 100M butterfly with a time of 56.28 to finish ahead of Claire Curzan who placed 2nd with a time of 56.25. On the final morning of the competition Huske finished 5th in the prelims of the 50M freestyle with a time of 24.76. In finals, Huske won her third event of the meet when she won the 50M free with a time of 24.50 just 2/100s of a second ahead of Erika Brown who finished 2nd with a time of 24.52.

==== 2022 FINA (LC) World Championships ====
2022 LC World Championships
Gold medal – first place	100 m butterfly	55.64
Gold medal – first place	4x100 m mixed medley	3:38.79
Gold medal – first place	4x100 m medley	3:53.79
Bronze medal – third place	4x100 m freestyle	3:32.58
Bronze medal – third place	100 m freestyle	52.92
Bronze medal – third place	4x100 m mixed Freestyle	3:21.09

On the morning of the first day of competition at the Fina LC World Championships held in Budapest, Hungary Huske swam prelims of the 100M butterfly finishing 1st with a time of 56.82. In the evening session Huske swam the 100m butterfly again and placed first in semi-finals with a time of 56.29. Later that night she swam the lead-off leg of the women's 4x100 freestyle relay with a time of 52.96. Huske won her first bronze of the meet when U.S. placed 3rd in this race with an overall time of 3:32.58. With her time in this race, Huske became the 3rd fastest woman in American history, and one of only four American women ever to go under 53 seconds in the 100M freestyle, the others being Simone Manuel, Mallroy Comerford, and Abbey Weitzeil.

The next day, the second of the meet, Huske won her first gold medal of the meet by placing 1st in the 100m butterfly with a time of 55.64, a half a second in front of second place finisher Marie Wattel of France. With this finish Huske became the 4th fastest women in World history and she also broke her own American record which she set a year earlier at the U.S. Olympic Trials in Omaha, Nebraska.

On the fourth day of the meet Huske earned her second gold medal when she swam the fly leg of the 4x100M mixed medley relay. Her split of 56.17 was the fastest female fly split by over a second and it helped the U.S. win with a time of 3:38.79, which was more than two and a half seconds in front of the 2nd place Australian team which finished with a time of 3:41.34.

On day five of the competition Huske started off swimming in the mornings prelim session by finishing 3rd in the 100M freestyle with a time of 53.72. In semi-finals later that night she again finished 3rd with a time of 53.04.

Day six began for Huske in the morning where she swam prelims in the 50M butterfly. She finished 10th in prelims with a time of 26.10 making it through to semi-finals. Later that night Huske swam the first race of the evening and won her second bronze of the meet when she finished 3rd in the 100m freestyle with a time of 52.92 behind Mollie O’Callahan of Australia and Sarah Sjostrom of Sweden. A bit later in the session Huske swam in the semi-final of the 50M butterfly where she finished 2nd in a time of 25.38 breaking the Americas and American record of 25.48 formerly owned by Kelsi Dahlia.

Huske started off swimming prelims in the morning session of day seven when she swam the 50m freestyle, finishing 8th with a time of 24.91. In Huske's first race of the evening session she swam the 50M butterfly final where she finished 5th with a time of 25.45. To complete a busy evening session with three events, Huske swam in the 4x100 freestyle relay earning her third bronze of the meet. Huske swam the third leg of the relay with a time of 52.50.

On the eighth and last day of the meet Huske swam two events in finals, the 50M freestyle where she finished 6th with a time of 24.64. Huske then completed her meet in the last race of the entire meet, the women's 4x100 medley relay. She earned her third gold medal when she helped the U.S. team by splitting 56.67 on the butterfly leg.

During the meet Huske swam a total of 16 races making her the busiest swimmer of the meet. With her medal count at the 2022 World Championships, Huske became one of only four American women in history to win six medals in a World Championship, the others being Katie Ledecky, Missy Franklin and Simone Manuel. In addition, for her performance named Ultra Swimmer of the Month for June 2022.

==== 2022–2023 fall collegiate season ====
Huske started her sophomore competition season on October 13, 2022, in a home dual meet against Utah. She started off the meet by swimming freestyle anchor as part of a winning 4x50 y medley relay team which went 1:39.93. In her second race of the meet, Huske faced freshman Clair Curzan in the 100y backstroke where she narrowly defeated the 2022 LC World Championships bronze medal winner in the event by .02 with a time of 52.62. In her third race of the competition Huske won the 200Y breaststroke with a time of 2:14.65. Huske capped off the competition by swimming the third leg of the winning 4x100 freestyle relay team where she split 51.29 and the team swam 3:20.46. She followed up the relay by finishing second in the 200y freestyle with a time of 1:48.80 before winning the 100y butterfly with a time of 53.72.

On the second day of the Greensboro, North Carolina NC State/GAC Invite competition, which was held from November 17–19, Huske led off finals by swimming the backstroke leg of the 4x50y medley relay with a time of 23.82. Stanford placed second in the event, earning an NCAA A cut with an overall time of 1:34.37. Later in the second day of finals Huske swam won the 100y butterfly with a time of 49.25. This time not only earned her another NCAA A cut, but it was also the fastest fall time in the NCAA, and fastest time in history in a non-NCAA Championship meet. Huske earned a B cut in the individual 200 freestyle of the NCAA Championship meet. On the third and last day of finals, Huske first race was the 100y freestyle where she won the event, while again posting an NCAA top fall time of 46.85, and earning yet another NCAA A cut.

In the final women's event of the meet, Huske swam anchor on the Women's 4x100Y freestyle relay. She posted a split of 46.96 and Stanford won the event with a top fall time in the NCAA with time of 3:10.72. Over the course of the NCAA/GAC Invite Huske earned six NCAA top times, three individual (100Y free, 100Y butterfly, and 200Y individual medley) and three relay (5x50 freestyle relay, 4x100 freestyle relay, and 4x200 freestyle relay). In addition, during the meet she qualified for her four individual NCAA A cuts (50 freestyle, 100 freestyle, 100 butterfly, 200 individual medley) and one NCAA B cut (200 freestyle).

==== 2022 FINA Short Course World Championships (25 m) ====
2022 SC World Championships (25m)
Gold medal – first place	50 m butterfly	24.64
Gold medal – first place	4x50 m mixed medley relay	1:35.15
Gold medal – first place	4x100 m medley relay	3:44.35
Gold medal – first place	4x50 m freestyle relay	1:33.89
Silver medal – second place	100 m butterfly	54.75
Silver medal – second place	4x100 m freestyle relay	3:26.29
Silver medal – second place	4x50 m medley relay	1:42.41

On October 19, Huske was named to the U.S. team for the 2022 World Swimming Short Course Championships team for the United States in 100m freestyle, 50m butterfly, and 100m butterfly. On the first day of competition, December 13, at the Fina SC World Championships in Melbourne, Australia, Huske began the preliminary session by finishing fourth in the 50m butterfly with a time of 25.11. Later that morning, Huske anchored the women's 4 × 100 m freestyle relay with a time of 52.74. The United States finished fourth in the relay with a time of 3:31.11. In the evening session, Huske won her semifinal heat and finished third overall in the 50m butterfly with a time of 24.86. Later, Huske earned her first medal of the meet (silver) when she led off in the finals of the women's 4x100m freestyle relay with a time of 51.73, the fastest leadoff split in the race. The United States team (Huske, Kate Douglass, Claire Curzan and Erika Brown) finished second while setting a new American record of 3:26.29. In the morning of the second day of competition Huske swam the 100m freestyle and finished sixth with a time of 52.48. Later, Huske won her second medal, and first gold of the meet. when she swam the freestyle leg of the 4x50m mixed medley in 23.73. The Americans (Ryan Murphy, Nic Fink, Huske and Kate Douglass ) won the race while breaking the world, championship and American records with a time of 1:35.15. After just one race (men's 800m freestyle), Huske swam the semifinal in the 100m freestyle. She swam in the first heat and moved on to finals by finishing sixth in semifinals with a time of 52.11. Huske swam three events in the evening of her busiest day of the competition. She capped off the evening by swimming the final of the women's 50m butterfly. Huske won her second gold and third medal of the meet, tying Maggie MacNeil with a time of 24.64. On the third day of the competition, Huske swam in the evening session's first event, the finals of the 100m freestyle, in which she finished fifth with a time of 52.04. Later in the evening session, Huske won her third gold medal and fourth medal of the meet when she led off with a time of 24.08 in the women's 4x50m freestyle relay. The American team (Huske, Claire Curzan, Erika Brown and Kate Douglass) earned gold and set championship and American records with a time of 1:33.89. On Saturday morning, the fifth day of the competition, Huske finished second in prelims of the 100m butterfly with a time of 56.01. That night, Huske won a silver medal, her fifth medal of the competition, when she swam the butterfly leg of the women's 4x50m medley relay in a time of 24.94. The American team (Claire Curzan, Lilly King, Huske and Kate Douglass) finished in 1:42.41. Later, swimming in lane four of heat one of semifinals. Huske won her heat and finished first overall in the 100m butterfly with a time of 55.23. On Sunday, the sixth and last day of the competition, Huske was in the first race of the evening session, the 100m butterfly. She won her third silver, and sixth medal of the competition, while finishing second with a time of 54.75. The penultimate race of the meet was a showdown between the Americans and the Australians in the women's 4x100m medley relay. Huske won her fourth gold and seventh medal of the competition, swimming butterfly leg as she had done in the mixed 4x50 medley relay and the women's 4x50m medley relay, in 54.53. The American team (Claire Curzan, Lilly King, Huske and Kate Douglass) won gold and set a world record with a time of 3:44.35.

Over the six-day competition, Huske won seven medals: four golds and three silvers. No woman in the competition won more medals than did Huske. She set or helped set two world records and four American records.

During the two Fina Swimming World Championships held in 2022, long course (held in Budapest, Hungary) and short course (held in Melbourne Australia) Huske won a total of 13 medals (seven gold, three silvers and three bronzes), more than any other woman. She set or helped set two world records and six American records.

=== 2024 Summer Olympics ===
2024 Summer Olympics
Gold medal – first place	100 m butterfly	55.59
Gold medal – first place	4x100 m medley	3:49.63 (WR)
Gold medal – first place	4x100 m mixed medley	3:37.43 (WR)
Silver medal – second place	100 m freestyle	52.29
Silver medal – second place	4x100 m freestyle	3:30.20 (AM)

At the 2024 Olympic Games, Huske won three gold medals and two silver medals. After missing the 100-meter butterfly podium by 0.01 at the previous Olympics, she won the 2024 race in 55.59, out-touching her teammate and world record holder Gretchen Walsh by 0.04. She also won a surprise silver in the 100-meter freestyle with a personal best of 52.29 behind Sarah Sjostrom. Huske, Walsh, Kate Douglass, and Simone Manuel took silver in the 4 × 100 m freestyle relay, setting an American record of 3:30.20; Huske swam the fastest American split of 52.06. She won another gold and set the world record in the 4x100m mixed medley relay with Walsh, Ryan Murphy, and Nic Fink, anchoring with a freestyle split of 51.88, the fastest in the field. In the final swimming event of the Games, Huske anchored the women's 4x100m medley relay to another world-record first-place finish with Regan Smith, Lilly King, and Walsh.

== World records ==
=== Short course (25 m) ===
No.	Event	Time	Meet	Date	Location	Type	Status	Ref
1	4x50m mixed medley	1:35.15	2022 SC World Championships	December 14, 2022	Melbourne, AUS	WR	Current	
2	4 × 100 m medley	3:44.35	2022 SC World Championships	December 14, 2022	Melbourne, AUS	WR	Current	

== Continental and national records ==
=== Long course (50 m) US records ===
No.	Event	Time		Meet	Date	Location	Type	Status	Ref
1	100 m butterfly	55.78	sf	2020 US Olympic Trials	June 13, 2021	Omaha, Nebraska	NR	Former	
2	100 m butterfly (2)	55.66		2020 US Olympic Trials	June 14, 2021	Omaha, Nebraska	NR	Former	
3	100 m butterfly (3)	55.64		2022 World Championships	June 19, 2022	Budapest, Hungary	NR	Former	
4	50m butterfly	25.38	sf	2022 World Championships	June 23, 2022	Budapest, Hungary	NR	Current	

=== Short course (25 m) US records ===
No.	Event	Time	Meet	Date	Location	Type	Status	Ref
1	4x50m freestyle	1:33.89	2022 SC World Championships	December 15, 2022	Melbourne, AUS	NR	Current	
2	4 × 100 m freestyle	3:26.29	2022 SC World Championships	December 15, 2022	Melbourne, AUS	NR	Current	
3	4 × 100 m medley	3:44.35	2022 SC World Championships	December 18, 2022	Melbourne, AUS	NR	Current	
4	4x50m mixed medley	1:35.15	2022 SC World Championships	December 14, 2022	Melbourne, AUS	NR	Current	

Legend: AM – Americas record; e – equalled existing record;
Records not set in finals: h – heat; sf – semifinal; r – relay 1st leg; rh – relay heat 1st leg; b – B final; † – en route to final mark; so – swim-off; tt – time trial

== Personal bests ==
=== Long course (50 m) ===
Event	Time	Date	Meet	Location	Ref
50 m freestyle	24.44	April 11, 2021	2021 TAC Titans Premier Invitational	Cary, North Carolina	
100 m freestyle	52.29	July 31, 2024	2024 Summer Olympics	Paris, France	
200 m freestyle	1:58.09	April 30, 2021	TYR Spring Cup	Richmond, VA	
50 m butterfly	25.38	June 23, 2022	2022 World Championships	Budapest, Hungary	
100 m butterfly	55.52	June 16, 2024	2024 United States Olympic trials	Indianapolis, Indiana	
200 m butterfly	2:09.97	April 9, 2021	2021 TAC Titans Premier Invitational	Cary, North Carolina	
200 m medley	2:10.38	June 6, 2021	2020 US Olympic Trials	Omaha, Nebraska	

=== Short course (25 m) ===
Event	Time		Date	Meet	Location	Ref
50 m freestyle	24.08	r	December 15, 2022	2022 SC World Championships	Melbourne, AUS	
100 m freestyle	51.93		December 12, 2021	2021 SC World Championships	Abu Dhabi, UAE	
200 m freestyle	1:54.72	r	December 21, 2021	2021 SC World Championships	Abu Dhabi, UAE	
50 m butterfly	24.64		December 14, 2022	2022 SC World Championships	Melbourne, AUS	
100 m butterfly	54.75		December 18, 2022	2022 SC World Championships	Melbourne, AUS	

=== Short course (25 y) ===
Event	Time		Date	Meet	Location	Ref
50 y freestyle	21.39		March 18, 2021	2021 PVS SC Championships Series	Manassas, VA	
100 y freestyle	46.82	r	March 19, 2022	2022 NCAA Swimming and Diving Championships	Atlanta, GA	
200 y freestyle	1:41.93		March 16, 2022	2022 NCAA Swimming and Diving Championships	Atlanta, GA	
100 y butterfly	49.17		March 18, 2022	2022 NCAA Swimming and Diving Championships	Atlanta, GA	
200 y medley	1:51.81		March 20, 2022	2022 NCAA Swimming and Diving Championships	Atlanta, GA	

=== U.S Olympic trials and International Team trials (50 m) ===
Meet	50 free	100 free	200 free	50 Fly	100 fly	200 medley	Ref
2020 U.S Olympic Trials	3rd	10th	11th		1st place, gold medalist(s)	4th	
2022 U.S. Team Trials	1st place, gold medalist(s)	1st place, gold medalist(s)	10th	2nd place, silver medalist(s)	1st place, gold medalist(s)		

=== International championships (50 m) ===
Meet	50 free	100 free	50 fly	100 fly	4x100 free	4x100 medley	4x100 mixed free	4x100 mixed medley	Ref
2019 World Junior Championships		2nd place, silver medalist(s)	1st place, gold medalist(s)	1st place, gold medalist(s)	1st place, gold medalist(s)	1st place, gold medalist(s)		1st place, gold medalist(s)	
2021 Olympic Games				4th		2nd place, silver medalist(s)		5th	
2022 World Championships	6th	3rd place, bronze medalist(s)	6th	1st place, gold medalist(s)	3rd place, bronze medalist(s)	1st place, gold medalist(s)	3rd place, bronze medalist(s)	1st place, gold medalist(s)	
2023 World Championships			5th	3rd place, bronze medalist(s)	2nd place, silver medalist(s)	1st place, gold medalist(s)		3rd place, bronze medalist(s)	
2024 Olympic Games		2nd place, silver medalist(s)		1st place, gold medalist(s)	2nd place, silver medalist(s)	1st place, gold medalist(s)		1st place, gold medalist(s)	
2025 World Championships	6th	3rd place, bronze medalist(s)		DNS	2nd place, silver medalist(s)	1st place, gold medalist(s)	1st place, gold medalist(s)	10th	

== Awards and honors ==
- Pac-12 Conference, Swimmer of the Meet: 2022 Women's Pac-12 Conference Championships
- Pac-12 Conference, Swimmer of the Month (female): November 2021
- Swimming World, The Week That Was: November 1, 2021 (#2)
- SwimSwam, Top 100 (Women's): 2022 (#21)
- SwimSwam, Swammy Award, Age Group Swimmer of the Year 17–18 (female): 2021
- SwimSwam, Swammy Award, Age Group Swimmer of the Year 15–16 (female): 2019
- USA Today, 10 to watch: 2020 Summer Olympics
- USA Swimming, Scholastic All-American: 4 time recipient (2017–2021)
- National Interscholastic Swimming Coaches Association (NISCA), Academic All-American High School Swimmer: 2020–2021
- Washington Post, Swimmer of the Year: 2018 & 2019
- Swimming World, High School Swimmer of the Year: 2019 & 2021
- Ultra Swim, Ultra Swim Swimmer of the Month: June 2021
- USA Today, High School Swimmer of the Year: 2021
- SwimSwam, SwimSwams Top 100 for 2022 (#21)
- College Swimming Coaches Association of America (CSCAA), Division I All-American (6 events)
- Swimming World, Pre-World Championships Rankings: The Top 25 Female swimmers in the World (#18)
- Stanford, Stanford Conference Athlete of the Year, Women's Swimming and Diving: 2022
- SwimSwam. Top 15 Women of the 2022 Fina World Championships (#4)
- Ultra Swim, Ultra Swim Swimmer of the Month: June 2022
- The Athletic. College Sports 40 Under 40-Top Young Coaches, Players and Execs, Influencers changing the game (Only swimmer named): August 23, 2022
- Golden Goggle Awards, Female Athlete of the Year: 2024
- Golden Goggle Awards, Female Race of the Year: 2024
- Golden Goggle Awards, Relay Performance of the Year: 2024, 2025

== See also ==
- List of World Swimming Championships (25 m) medalists (women)
