= Swimming at the 2016 Summer Olympics =

Swimming at the Games of the XXXI Olympiad
- Venue: Olympic Aquatics Stadium
- Dates: 6–13 August 2016
- No. of events: 32
- Competitors: 906 from 174 nations

The swimming competitions at the 2016 Summer Olympics in Rio de Janeiro took place from 6 to 13 August at the Olympic Aquatics Stadium.

== Events ==
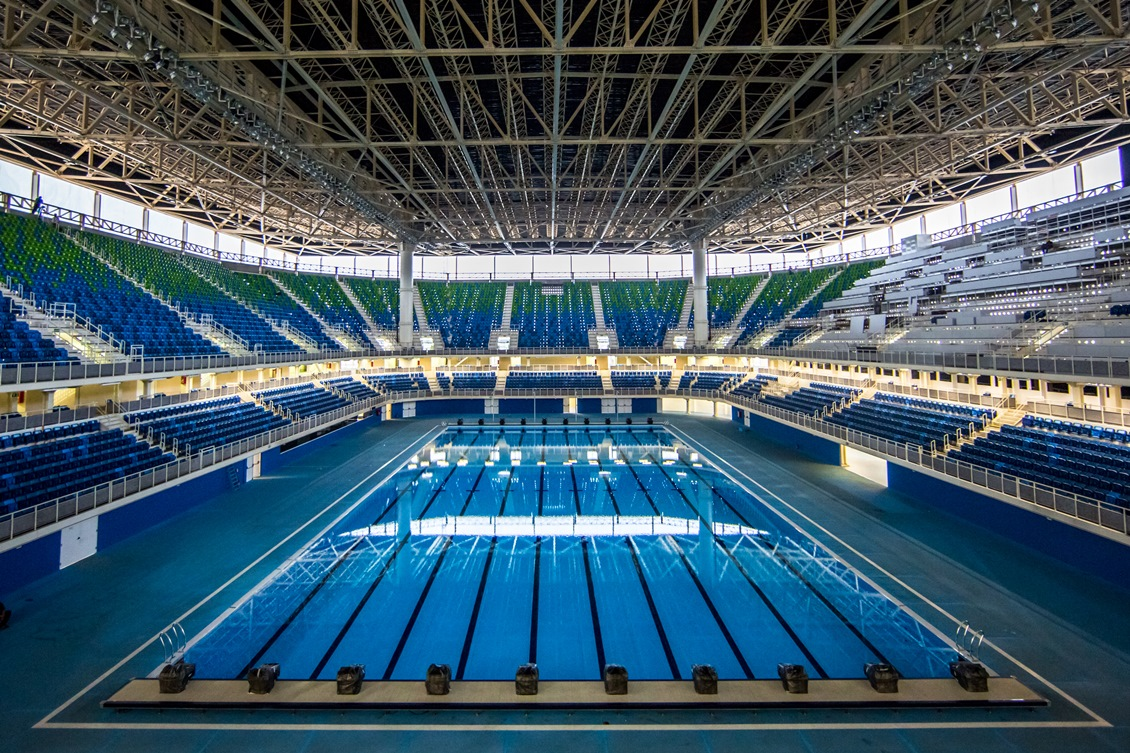
Interior view of the Olympic Aquatics Stadium, the temporary venue used for swimming at the 2016 Summer Olympics.

Similar to the program's format in 2012, swimming features a total of 32 events (16 each for men and women). The following events were contested (all pool events are long course, and distances are in metres unless stated):

- Freestyle: 50, 100, 200, 400, 800 (women), and 1500 (men);
- Backstroke: 100 and 200;
- Breaststroke: 100 and 200;
- Butterfly: 100 and 200;
- Individual medley: 200 and 400;
- Relays: 4 × 100 free, 4 × 200 free; 4 × 100 medley

=== Schedule ===
Similar to previous Olympics since 2000, with the exception of 2008, the swimming program schedule occurred in two segments. The prelims are held in the afternoon, followed by the semifinals and final in the evening and the night session (due to the substantial fees NBC has paid for rights to the Olympics, the IOC has allowed NBC to have influence on event scheduling to maximize U.S. television ratings when possible; NBC agreed to a $7.75 billion contract extension on May 7, 2014, to air the Olympics through the 2032 games and is also one of the major sources of revenue for the IOC). The dates in the table are for August.

Legend
H	Heats	½	Semi-finals	F	Final

A = Afternoon session, starting at 13:00 local time (16:00 UTC).
N = Night session, starting at 22:00 local time (01:00 UTC the next day).

Men
Date →	Aug 6		Aug 7		Aug 8		Aug 9		Aug 10		Aug 11		Aug 12		Aug 13	
Event ↓	A	N	A	N	A	N	A	N	A	N	A	N	A	N	A	N
50 m freestyle											H	½		F		
100 m freestyle							H	½		F						
200 m freestyle			H	½		F										
400 m freestyle	H	F														
1500 m freestyle													H			F
100 m backstroke			H	½		F										
200 m backstroke									H	½		F				
100 m breaststroke	H	½		F												
200 m breaststroke							H	½		F						
100 m butterfly											H	½		F		
200 m butterfly					H	½		F								
200 m individual medley									H	½		F				
400 m individual medley	H	F														
4 × 100 m freestyle relay			H	F												
4 × 200 m freestyle relay							H	F								
4 × 100 m medley relay													H			F

Women
Date →	Aug 6		Aug 7		Aug 8		Aug 9		Aug 10		Aug 11		Aug 12		Aug 13	
Event ↓	A	N	A	N	A	N	A	N	A	N	A	N	A	N	A	N
50 m freestyle													H	½		F
100 m freestyle									H	½		F				
200 m freestyle					H	½		F								
400 m freestyle			H	F												
800 m freestyle											H			F		
100 m backstroke			H	½		F										
200 m backstroke											H	½		F		
100 m breaststroke			H	½		F										
200 m breaststroke									H	½		F				
100 m butterfly	H	½		F												
200 m butterfly							H	½		F						
200 m individual medley					H	½		F								
400 m individual medley	H	F														
4 × 100 m freestyle relay	H	F														
4 × 200 m freestyle relay									H	F						
4 × 100 m medley relay													H			F

== Qualification ==
FINA By-Law BL 9.3.6.4 laid out the qualification procedures for the "Swimming" competition at the Olympics. Each country is allowed to enter up to two swimmers per individual event (provided they qualify), and one entry per relay; and a country may not have more than 26 males and 26 females (52 total) on its team.

=== Individual events ===
On January 15, 2015, FINA posted the qualifying times for individual events for the 2016 Summer Olympics. The time standards consisted of two types: an "Olympic Qualifying Time" (OQT) and an "Olympic Selection time" (OST). Each country was able to enter up to two swimmers per event, provided both swimmers met the (faster) qualifying time. A country was able to enter one swimmer per event that met the invitation standard. Any swimmer who met the "qualifying" time was entered in the event for the Games; a swimmer meeting the "invitation" standard was eligible for entry, and their entry was allotted/filled in by ranking.

If a country had had no swimmers who meet either qualifying standard, it may have entered one male and one female. A country that did not receive an allocation spot but had at least one swimmer who met a qualifying standard might have enter the swimmer with the highest ranking.

=== Relay events ===
Each relay event features 16 teams, composed of:

- 12: the top-12 finishers at the 2015 World Championships in each relay event.
- 4: the 4 fastest non-qualified teams, based on times in the 15-months preceding the Olympics.

== Participation ==
=== Participating nations ===
A total of 906 swimmers (489 men and 417 women) competed in the 32 events (26 individual, plus six relays) contested at the Aquatics Stadium in Rio. Brazil, as the host country, receives guaranteed quota place in case it would not qualify any qualification places.

- Albania (2)
- Algeria (1)
- Andorra (2)
- Angola (2)
- Antigua and Barbuda (2)
- Argentina (5)
- Armenia (2)
- Aruba (2)
- Australia (37)
- Austria (6)
- Azerbaijan (2)
- Bahamas (3)
- Bahrain (1)
- Bangladesh (2)
- Barbados (2)
- Belarus (8)
- Belgium (10)
- Benin (2)
- Bermuda (2)
- Bolivia (2)
- Bosnia and Herzegovina (2)
- Botswana (2)
- Brazil (33)
- British Virgin Islands (1)
- Bulgaria (2)
- Burkina Faso (2)
- Burundi (2)
- Cambodia (2)
- Canada (28)
- Cayman Islands (2)
- Central African Republic (2)
- Chile (2)
- China (43)
- Colombia (4)
- Comoros (2)
- Republic of the Congo (2)
- Cook Islands (2)
- Costa Rica (1)
- Croatia (2)
- Cuba (2)
- Cyprus (2)
- Czech Republic (7)
- Denmark (15)
- Djibouti (1)
- Dominican Republic (2)
- Ecuador (2)
- Egypt (5)
- El Salvador (2)
- Estonia (2)
- Ethiopia (2)
- Fiji (2)
- Finland (8)
- France (28)
- Gabon (1)
- The Gambia (1)
- Georgia (2)
- Germany (27)
- Great Britain (26)
- Ghana (2)
- Greece (13)
- Grenada (2)
- Guam (2)
- Guinea (2)
- Guatemala (2)
- Guyana (2)
- Haiti (2)
- Honduras (2)
- Hong Kong (7)
- Hungary (33)
- Iceland (3)
- India (2)
- Independent Olympic Athletes (2)
- Indonesia (2)
- Iran (1)
- Iraq (1)
- Ireland (3)
- Israel (7)
- Italy (35)
- Ivory Coast (2)
- Jamaica (2)
- Japan (34)
- Jordan (2)
- Kazakhstan (2)
- Kenya (2)
- Kosovo (2)
- Kyrgyzstan (2)
- Laos (2)
- Latvia (2)
- Lebanon (2)
- Libya (2)
- Liechtenstein (2)
- Lithuania (6)
- Luxembourg (3)
- Macedonia (2)
- Madagascar (2)
- Malaysia (2)
- Malawi (2)
- Maldives (2)
- Mali (2)
- Malta (2)
- Marshall Islands (2)
- Mauritius (2)
- Mexico (3)
- Federated States of Micronesia (2)
- Moldova (2)
- Mongolia (2)
- Montenegro (2)
- Morocco (2)
- Mozambique (2)
- Myanmar (1)
- Nepal (2)
- Netherlands (16)
- New Zealand (8)
- Nicaragua (2)
- Niger (2)
- Nigeria (2)
- Norway (2)
- Palau (2)
- Palestine (2)
- Pakistan (2)
- Panama (2)
- Papua New Guinea (1)
- Paraguay (2)
- Peru (2)
- Philippines (2)
- Poland (19)
- Portugal (4)
- Puerto Rico (2)
- Qatar (2)
- Refugee Olympic Team (2)
- Romania (6)
- Russia (34)
- Rwanda (2)
- Saint Lucia (1)
- Saint Vincent and the Grenadines (2)
- Samoa (2)
- Senegal (2)
- Serbia (6)
- Seychelles (2)
- Sierra Leone (2)
- Singapore (3)
- Slovakia (3)
- Slovenia (9)
- South Africa (11)
- South Korea (8)
- Spain (23)
- Sri Lanka (2)
- Sudan (2)
- Suriname (2)
- Sweden (11)
- Switzerland (8)
- Syria (2)
- Chinese Taipei (2)
- Tajikistan (2)
- Tanzania (2)
- Thailand (2)
- Togo (2)
- Tonga (2)
- Trinidad and Tobago (2)
- Tunisia (2)
- Turkey (4)
- Turkmenistan (2)
- Uganda (2)
- Ukraine (7)
- United Arab Emirates (2)
- United States (44)
- Uruguay (2)
- Uzbekistan (2)
- Venezuela (4)
- Vietnam (2)
- Virgin Islands (2)
- Yemen (1)
- Zambia (2)
- Zimbabwe (2)

== Medal summary ==
=== Medal table ===
Rank	Nation	Gold	Silver	Bronze	Total
1	United States	16	8	9	33
2	Australia	3	4	3	10
3	Hungary	3	2	2	7
4	Japan	2	2	3	7
5	Great Britain	1	5	0	6
6	China	1	2	3	6
7	Canada	1	1	4	6
8	Sweden	1	1	1	3
9	Italy	1	0	2	3
10	Denmark	1	0	1	2
10	Spain	1	0	1	2
12	Kazakhstan	1	0	0	1
12	Singapore	1	0	0	1
14	South Africa	0	3	0	3
15	Russia	0	2	2	4
16	France	0	2	0	2
17	Belgium	0	1	0	1
18	Belarus	0	0	1	1
Totals (18 entries)		33	33	32	98

=== Men's events ===
Games	Gold		Silver		Bronze	
50 m freestyle	Anthony Ervin; United States	21.40	Florent Manaudou; France	21.41	Nathan Adrian; United States	21.49
100 m freestyle	Kyle Chalmers; Australia	47.58 WJ	Pieter Timmers; Belgium	47.80 NR	Nathan Adrian; United States	47.85
200 m freestyle	Sun Yang; China	1:44.65	Chad le Clos; South Africa	1:45.20 AF	Conor Dwyer; United States	1:45.23
400 m freestyle	Mack Horton; Australia	3:41.55	Sun Yang; China	3:41.68	Gabriele Detti; Italy	3:43.49
1500 m freestyle	Gregorio Paltrinieri; Italy	14:34.57	Connor Jaeger; United States	14:39.48 AM	Gabriele Detti; Italy	14:40.86
100 m backstroke	Ryan Murphy; United States	51.97 OR	Xu Jiayu; China	52.31	David Plummer; United States	52.40
200 m backstroke	Ryan Murphy; United States	1:53.62	Mitch Larkin; Australia	1:53.96	Evgeny Rylov; Russia	1:53.97 ER
100 m breaststroke	Adam Peaty; Great Britain	57.13 WR	Cameron van der Burgh; South Africa	58.69	Cody Miller; United States	58.87 AM
200 m breaststroke	Dmitriy Balandin; Kazakhstan	2:07.46 NR	Josh Prenot; United States	2:07.53	Anton Chupkov; Russia	2:07.70 NR
100 m butterfly	Joseph Schooling; Singapore	50.39 OR, AS	Michael Phelps; United States Chad le Clos; South Africa László Cseh; Hungary	51.14	Not awarded as there was a tie for silver.	
200 m butterfly	Michael Phelps; United States	1:53.36	Masato Sakai; Japan	1:53.40	Tamás Kenderesi; Hungary	1:53.62
200 m individual medley	Michael Phelps; United States	1:54.66	Kosuke Hagino; Japan	1:56.61	Wang Shun; China	1:57.05
400 m individual medley	Kosuke Hagino; Japan	4:06.05 AS	Chase Kalisz; United States	4:06.75	Daiya Seto; Japan	4:09.71
4 × 100 m freestyle relay	United States; Caeleb Dressel (48.10); Michael Phelps (47.12); Ryan Held (47.73); Nathan Adrian (46.97); Jimmy Feigen^{[a]} Blake Pieroni^{[a]} Anthony Ervin^{[a]}	3:09.92	France; Mehdy Metella (48.08); Fabien Gilot (48.20); Florent Manaudou (47.14); Jérémy Stravius (47.11); Clément Mignon^{[a]} William Meynard^{[a]}	3:10.53	Australia; James Roberts (48.88); Kyle Chalmers (47.38); James Magnussen (48.11); Cameron McEvoy (47.00); Matthew Abood^{[a]}	3:11.37
4 × 200 m freestyle relay	United States; Conor Dwyer (1:45.23); Townley Haas (1:44.14); Ryan Lochte (1:46.03); Michael Phelps (1:45.26); Clark Smith^{[a]} Jack Conger^{[a]} Gunnar Bentz^{[a]}	7:00.66	Great Britain; Stephen Milne (1:46.97); Duncan Scott (1:45.05); Daniel Wallace (1:46.26); James Guy (1:44.85); Robbie Renwick^{[a]}	7:03.13 NR	Japan; Kosuke Hagino (1:45.34); Naito Ehara (1:46.11); Yuki Kobori (1:45.71); Takeshi Matsuda (1:46.34)	7:03.50
4 × 100 m medley relay	United States; Ryan Murphy (51.85) WR; Cody Miller (59.03); Michael Phelps (50.33); Nathan Adrian (46.74); David Plummer^{[a]} Kevin Cordes^{[a]} Tom Shields^{[a]} Caeleb Dressel^{[a]}	3:27.95 OR	Great Britain; Chris Walker-Hebborn (53.68); Adam Peaty (56.59); James Guy (51.35); Duncan Scott (47.62)	3:29.24 NR	Australia; Mitch Larkin (53.19); Jake Packard (58.84); David Morgan (51.18); Kyle Chalmers (46.72); Cameron McEvoy^{[a]}	3:29.93
AF African Record | AM Americas Record | SA South American Record | AS Asian Record | ER European Record | OC Oceanian Record | OR Olympic Record | WJR World Junior Record | WR World Record; NR National Record (any World Record is necessarily also an Olympic, area, and national record. Area records (for continental regions) are also national records)

^{a} Swimmers who participated in the heats only and received medals.

=== Women's events ===
Games	Gold		Silver		Bronze	
50 m freestyle	Pernille Blume; Denmark	24.07 NR	Simone Manuel; United States	24.09	Aliaksandra Herasimenia; Belarus	24.11 NR
100 m freestyle	Penny Oleksiak; Canada Simone Manuel; United States	52.70 OR, WJ, AM 52.70 OR, AM	Not awarded as there was a tie for gold.		Sarah Sjöström; Sweden	52.99
200 m freestyle	Katie Ledecky; United States	1:53.73	Sarah Sjöström; Sweden	1:54.08 NR	Emma McKeon; Australia	1:54.92
400 m freestyle	Katie Ledecky; United States	3:56.46 WR	Jazmin Carlin; Great Britain	4:01.23	Leah Smith; United States	4:01.92
800 m freestyle	Katie Ledecky; United States	8:04.79 WR	Jazmin Carlin; Great Britain	8:16.17	Boglárka Kapás; Hungary	8:16.37 NR
100 m backstroke	Katinka Hosszú; Hungary	58.45 NR	Kathleen Baker; United States	58.75	Kylie Masse; Canada Fu Yuanhui; China	58.76 NR 58.76 NR
200 m backstroke	Maya DiRado; United States	2:05.99	Katinka Hosszú; Hungary	2:06.05	Hilary Caldwell; Canada	2:07.54
100 m breaststroke	Lilly King; United States	1:04.93 OR	Yulia Efimova; Russia	1:05.50	Katie Meili; United States	1:05.69
200 m breaststroke	Rie Kaneto; Japan	2:20.30	Yulia Efimova; Russia	2:21.97	Shi Jinglin; China	2:22.28
100 m butterfly	Sarah Sjöström; Sweden	55.48 WR	Penny Oleksiak; Canada	56.46 WJ, NR	Dana Vollmer; United States	56.63
200 m butterfly	Mireia Belmonte García; Spain	2.04.85	Madeline Groves; Australia	2.04.88	Natsumi Hoshi; Japan	2.05.20
200 m individual medley	Katinka Hosszú; Hungary	2:06.58 OR	Siobhan-Marie O'Connor; Great Britain	2:06.88 NR	Maya DiRado; United States	2:08.79
400 m individual medley	Katinka Hosszú; Hungary	4:26.36 WR	Maya DiRado; United States	4:31.15	Mireia Belmonte García; Spain	4:32.39
4 × 100 m freestyle relay	Australia; Emma McKeon (53.41); Brittany Elmslie (53.12); Bronte Campbell (52.15); Cate Campbell (51.97); Madison Wilson^{[b]}	3:30.65 WR	United States; Simone Manuel (53.36); Abbey Weitzeil (52.56); Dana Vollmer (53.18); Katie Ledecky (52.79); Amanda Weir^{[b]} Lia Neal^{[b]} Allison Schmitt^{[b]}	3:31.89 AM	Canada; Sandrine Mainville (53.86); Chantal Van Landeghem (53.12); Taylor Ruck (53.19); Penny Oleksiak (52.72); Michelle Williams^{[b]}	3:32.89 NR
4 × 200 m freestyle relay	United States; Allison Schmitt (1:56.21); Leah Smith (1:56.69); Maya DiRado (1:56.39); Katie Ledecky (1:53.74); Missy Franklin^{[b]} Melanie Margalis^{[b]} Cierra Runge^{[b]}	7:43.03	Australia; Leah Neale (1:57.95); Emma McKeon (1:54.64); Bronte Barratt (1:55.81); Tamsin Cook (1:56.47); Jessica Ashwood^{[b]}	7:44.87	Canada; Katerine Savard (1:57.91); Taylor Ruck (1:56.18); Brittany MacLean (1:56.36); Penny Oleksiak (1:54.94); Kennedy Goss^{[b]} Emily Overholt^{[b]}	7:45.39 NR
4 × 100 m medley relay	United States; Kathleen Baker (59.00); Lilly King (1:05.70); Dana Vollmer (56.00); Simone Manuel (52.43); Olivia Smoliga^{[b]} Katie Meili^{[b]} Kelsi Worrell^{[b]} Abbey Weitzeil^{[b]}	3:53.13	Australia; Emily Seebohm (58.83); Taylor McKeown (1:07.05); Emma McKeon (56.95); Cate Campbell (52.17); Madison Wilson^{[b]} Madeline Groves^{[b]} Brittany Elmslie^{[b]}	3:55.00	Denmark; Mie Nielsen (58.75); Rikke Møller Pedersen (1:06.62); Jeanette Ottesen (56.43); Pernille Blume (53.21)	3:55.01 ER
AF African Record | AM Americas Record | SA South American Record | AS Asian Record | ER European Record | OC Oceanian Record | OR Olympic Record | WJR World Junior Record | WR World Record; NR National Record (any World Record is necessarily also an Olympic, area, and national record. Area records (for continental regions) are also national records)

^{b} Swimmers who participated in the heats only and received medals.

== Olympic and world records broken ==
=== Men ===
Event	Established for	Date	Round	Name	Nationality	Time	Record	Day
Men's 100 metre breaststroke	(same)	6 August	Heats	Adam Peaty	Great Britain	57.55	WR	1
Men's 100 metre breaststroke	(same)	7 August	Final	Adam Peaty	Great Britain	57.13	WR	2
Men's 100 metre backstroke	(same)	8 August	Final	Ryan Murphy	United States	51.97	OR	3
Men's 200 metre breaststroke	(same)	9 August	Semifinal	Ippei Watanabe	Japan	2:07.22	OR	4
Men's 100 metre butterfly	(same)	12 August	Final	Joseph Schooling	Singapore	50.39	OR	7
Men's 4 × 100 metre medley relay	Men's 100 metre backstroke	13 August	Final	Ryan Murphy	United States	51.85 r	WR	8
Men's 4 × 100 metre medley relay	(same)	13 August	Final	Ryan Murphy (51.85); Cody Miller (59.03); Michael Phelps (50.33); Nathan Adrian (46.74)	United States	3:27.95	OR	8

=== Women ===
Event	Date	Round	Name	Nationality	Time	Record	Day
Women's 4 × 100 metre freestyle relay	6 August	Heats	Madison Wilson (54.11); Brittany Elmslie (53.22); Bronte Campbell (53.26); Cate Campbell (51.80)	Australia	3:32.39	OR	1
Women's 100 metre butterfly	6 August	Semifinal	Sarah Sjöström	Sweden	55.84	OR	1
Women's 400 metre individual medley	6 August	Final	Katinka Hosszú	Hungary	4:26.36	WR	1
Women's 4 × 100 metre freestyle relay	6 August	Final	Emma McKeon (53.41); Brittany Elmslie (53.12); Bronte Campbell (52.15); Cate Campbell (51.97)	Australia	3:30.65	WR	1
Women's 400 metre freestyle	7 August	Heats	Katie Ledecky	United States	3:58.71	OR	2
Women's 100 metre butterfly	7 August	Final	Sarah Sjöström	Sweden	55.48	WR	2
Women's 400 metre freestyle	7 August	Final	Katie Ledecky	United States	3:56.46	WR	2
Women's 200 metre individual medley	8 August	Heats	Katinka Hosszú	Hungary	2:07.45	OR	3
Women's 100 metre breaststroke	8 August	Final	Lilly King	United States	1:04.93	OR	3
Women's 200 metre individual medley	9 August	Final	Katinka Hosszú	Hungary	2:06.58	OR	4
Women's 100 metre freestyle	10 August	Heats	Cate Campbell	Australia	52.78	OR	5
Women's 100 metre freestyle	10 August	Semifinals	Cate Campbell	Australia	52.71	OR	5
Women's 800 metre freestyle	11 August	Heats	Katie Ledecky	United States	8.12.86	OR	6
Women's 100 metre freestyle	11 August	Final	Simone Manuel	United States	52.70	OR	6
Women's 100 metre freestyle	11 August	Final	Penny Oleksiak	Canada	52.70	OR	6
Women's 800 metre freestyle	12 August	Final	Katie Ledecky	United States	8.04.79	WR	7

Legend: r – First leg of relay

- All world records (WR) are consequently Olympic records (OR).

== See also ==
- Swimming at the 2016 Summer Paralympics
