= 2026 Pan Pacific Swimming Championships – Women's 50 metre butterfly =

Women's 50 metre butterfly at the 2026 Pan Pacific Swimming Championships
- Venue: William Woollett Jr. Aquatics Center
- Dates: August 12
- Competitors: 20 from 10 nations
- Winning time: 24.65 CR

Medalists
gold medal	Gretchen Walsh	United States
silver medal	Kate Douglass	United States
bronze medal	Taylor Ruck	Canada

Official Video (heats)

Official Video (B and A final)

The women's 50 metre butterfly event at the 2026 Pan Pacific Swimming Championships was held on August 12 at the William Woollett Jr. Aquatics Center in Irvine, California. It was the first of 41 events on the four-day pool swimming program, and the second time the women's 50 metre butterfly had been contested at the championships, having previously been held in 2010. A total of 20 swimmers from 10 nations entered the competition. The event was won by American Gretchen Walsh, the reigning world champion, in a championship record time of 24.65 seconds. Her compatriot Kate Douglass claimed the silver medal in 25.06 seconds, while Canadian Taylor Ruck won bronze in a new Canadian record time of 25.23 seconds. Australia's Alexandria Perkins finished fourth in 25.34 seconds.

== Competition format and event history ==
The Pan Pacific Swimming Championships is an international long course swimming competition first held in 1985. It was established as an alternative to the European Championships and is open to nations that are not members of European Aquatics. (Note: At a meeting of the four charter nations of the Pan Pacific Swimming Association (the United States, Australia, Canada and Japan) on August 23, 2024, it was agreed that the 10 kilometre open water events at the 2026 championships would be open to all members of European Aquatics wishing to participate, with a maximum of two entries per nation in each event.) The 2026 championships featured 41 swimming events in the pool across four days, from August 12 to 15, preceded by the men's and women's 10 km open water swimming events on August 10. The women's 50 metre butterfly was the third event overall and the first on the pool swimming program.

The event consisted of preliminary heats followed by an A final and a B final, with no semifinals contested. Both the heats and finals were held on August 12, the opening day of pool competition. Under the championship regulations, each nation could enter an unlimited number of swimmers in the preliminary heats. However, only the two fastest eligible swimmers from each nation could advance to the A final, following any withdrawals. Each nation could also qualify up to two additional swimmers for the B final, regardless of whether it had one or two representatives in the A final. Consequently, a maximum of four swimmers per nation could compete across both finals. The eight A finalists contested the medals and championship points, while the B final determined the remaining eligible finishing positions.

The women's 50 metre butterfly was first contested at the 2010 championships, although the 50 metre butterfly, backstroke and breaststroke events were excluded from official championship scoring. In the preliminary heats, Australia's Emily Seebohm recorded 26.36 seconds in the opening heat, before compatriot Marieke Guehrer lowered the championship mark to 26.19 in the third heat. Later that day, Yolane Kukla established a championship record of 25.99 seconds in the B final, which Guehrer equalled in winning the A final. The event was not contested at the 2014 or 2018 championships, while the 2022 championships were cancelled due to the COVID-19 pandemic. The men's and women's 50 metre butterfly, backstroke and breaststroke events were included in the championship program in 2026, ahead of their introduction as Olympic medal events at the 2028 Summer Olympics in Los Angeles, following approval by the International Olympic Committee in April 2025. The official timing documentation for the 2026 championships listed a pre-competition championship record of 25.99 seconds, matching the performances of Kukla and Guehrer in 2010.

== Race summary ==
A total of 20 swimmers from 10 nations entered the event. American Claire Curzan withdrew from the event to focus on the women's 100 metre backstroke, which was also contested on the opening day. Curzan subsequently missed the A final of the 100 metre backstroke under the two-swimmers-per-nation restriction, but won the B final. Canada's Taylor Ruck was the first to break the championship record with a time of 25.61 seconds in the opening heat. This was also a new Canadian record, eclipsing Penny Oleksiak's 25.62 from 2017. American Kate Douglass lowered the championship mark to 24.99 in the second heat, becoming the third woman in history to complete the event in under 25 seconds. Her compatriot Gretchen Walsh subsequently recorded the fastest qualifying time of 24.91 in the third heat, setting the third successive improvement to the championship record of the morning. Australia's Alexandria Perkins qualified third overall in 25.57, followed by Ruck in fourth and South Africa's Erin Gallagher in fifth. Despite recording the seventh-fastest time of 26.19, American Torri Huske was assigned to the B final under the two-swimmers-per-nation restriction, alongside fellow American Phoebe Bacon, who qualified ninth overall in 26.48. Australia's Elizabeth Dekkers did not start her heat. In the evening session, New Zealand's Hazel Ouwehand won the B final in 26.13, ahead of Huske in 26.20 and Bacon in 26.32.

Walsh entered the A final as the fastest qualifier, having established an American record of 24.51 earlier in 2026. She improved on her preliminary time to win the gold medal in a championship record of 24.65, finishing 0.41 seconds ahead of Douglass, who claimed silver in 25.06. The result gave the United States a one-two finish in the first individual final of the championships. Ruck secured the bronze medal in 25.23, lowering her own Canadian record established during the heats. Perkins finished fourth in 25.34, followed by Gallagher in fifth with 25.43 and Japan's Rikako Ikee in sixth with 25.96. New Zealand's Zoe Pedersen and Canada's Leilani Fack completed the A final in seventh and eighth, respectively.

== Records ==
Prior to this competition, the existing records were as follows:

Records before the 2026 Pan Pacific Swimming Championships
Record	Time (s)	Athlete (nation)	Meet	Location	Date	Ref
World record	24.43	Sarah Sjöström (SWE)	Swedish Championships	Borås, Sweden	July 5, 2014	
Championship record	25.99	Record Mark				

== Schedule ==
The schedule was as follows:

All times are Pacific Daylight Time (UTC−7)

Schedule
Date	Time	Round
Wednesday, August 12, 2026	10:00	Heats
Wednesday, August 12, 2026	19:00	Finals

== Results ==
=== Heats ===
The heats were held at 10:00 on August 12, 2026.

Key: QA = Qualified for A final; QB = Qualified for B final; R = Reserve; CR = Championship record; NR = National record; DNS = Did not start.

Heat results
Rank	Heat	Lane	Swimmer	Nation	Time	Notes
1	3	4	Gretchen Walsh	United States	24.91	QA, CR
2	2	4	Kate Douglass	United States	24.99	QA, CR
3	3	5	Alexandria Perkins	Australia	25.57	QA
4	1	3	Taylor Ruck	Canada	25.61	QA, NR, CR
5	2	3	Erin Gallagher	South Africa	25.64	QA
6	1	4	Rikako Ikee	Japan	25.90	QA
7	2	5	Torri Huske	United States	26.19	QB
8	2	2	Leilani Fack	Canada	26.47	QA
9	2	6	Phoebe Bacon	United States	26.48	QB
10	3	3	Zoe Pedersen	New Zealand	26.62	QA
11	1	5	Hazel Ouwehand	New Zealand	26.72	QB
12	3	2	Celia Pulido	Mexico	26.88	QB
13	3	6	Matea Gigovic	Canada	26.89	QB
14	1	2	Ayu Mizoguchi	Japan	26.90	QB
15	1	6	Emma Harvey	Bermuda	26.91	QB
16	3	7	Liu Pei-yin	Chinese Taipei	27.33	QB
17	1	7	Maddy Moore	Bermuda	28.27	R
18	2	1	Christanya Shirley	Jamaica	28.29	R
19	3	1	Leigh McMorran	South Africa	28.81	
	2	7	Elizabeth Dekkers	Australia	DNS	

=== B final ===
The B final was held at 19:00 on August 12, 2026.

B final results
Rank	Lane	Swimmer	Nation	Time	Notes
9	3	Hazel Ouwehand	New Zealand	26.13	
10	4	Torri Huske	United States	26.20	
11	5	Phoebe Bacon	United States	26.32	
12	2	Matea Gigovic	Canada	26.52	
13	7	Ayu Mizoguchi	Japan	26.64	
14	1	Emma Harvey	Bermuda	26.83	
15	6	Celia Pulido	Mexico	26.84	
16	8	Liu Pei-yin	Chinese Taipei	26.95	

=== A final ===
The A final was held after the B final on August 12, 2026.

A final results
Rank	Lane	Swimmer	Nation	Time	Points (Note: A team trophy was awarded to the nation scoring the most points. In individual events, points were awarded on a 9–7–6–5–4–3–2–1 basis for first through eighth place in the A final. In relay events, points were awarded on an 18–14–12–10–8–6–4–2 basis for the first- through eighth-place teams in the A final. The United States won the team title with 540.5 points, ahead of Australia (409), Japan (228) and Canada (220).)	Notes
1st place, gold medalist(s)	4	Gretchen Walsh	United States	24.65	9	CR
2nd place, silver medalist(s)	5	Kate Douglass	United States	25.06	7	
3rd place, bronze medalist(s)	6	Taylor Ruck	Canada	25.23	6	NR
4	3	Alexandria Perkins	Australia	25.34	5	
5	2	Erin Gallagher	South Africa	25.43	4	
6	7	Rikako Ikee	Japan	25.96	3	
7	8	Zoe Pedersen	New Zealand	26.45	2	
8	1	Leilani Fack	Canada	26.63	1	
