= 2016 FINA World Swimming Championships (25 m) – Women's 4 × 200 metre freestyle relay =

Women's 4 × 200 metre freestyle relay at the 2016 FINA World Swimming Championships (25 m)
- Venue: WFCU Centre
- Dates: 10 December (heats and final)
- Competitors: 45 from 10 nations
- Teams: 10
- Winning time: 7:33.89 AM

Medalists
gold medal	Katerine Savard; Taylor Ruck; Kennedy Goss; Penny Oleksiak; Alexia Zevnik	Canada
silver medal	Leah Smith; Mallory Comerford; Sarah Gibson; Madisyn Cox; Katie Drabot	United States
bronze medal	Daria Mullakaeva; Daria Ustinova; Arina Openysheva; Veronika Popova; Irina Krivonogova	Russia

The Women's 4 × 200 metre freestyle relay competition of the 2016 FINA World Swimming Championships (25 m) was held on 10 December 2016.

== Records ==
Prior to the competition, the existing world and championship records were as follows.

	Nation	Time	Location	Date
World record Championship record	Netherlands	7:32.85	Doha	3 December 2014

== Results ==
=== Heats ===
The heats were held at 12:12.

Rank	Heat	Lane	Nation	Swimmers	Time	Notes
1	1	8	United States	Mallory Comerford (1:54.63); Sarah Gibson (1:55.46); Katie Drabot (1:56.18); Leah Smith (1:54.98)	7:41.25	Q
2	1	3	China	Zhang Yuhan (1:57.06); Ai Yanhan (1:56.65); Dong Jie (1:56.44); Shen Duo (1:56.10)	7:46.25	Q
3	1	7	Canada	Kennedy Goss (1:55.97); Alexia Zevnik (1:55.87); Taylor Ruck (1:56.79); Penny Oleksiak (1:57.70)	7:46.33	Q
4	1	2	Russia	Daria Mullakaeva (1:56.83); Irina Krivonogova (1:57.97); Daria Ustinova (1:54.92); Arina Openysheva (1:56.67)	7:46.39	Q
5	1	0	Japan	Tomomi Aoki (1:56.14); Chihiro Igarashi (1:56.00); Yui Yamane (1:58.32); Aya Takano (1:57.01)	7:47.47	Q
6	1	9	Australia	Carla Buchanan (1:57.00); Jemma Schlicht (1:57.95); Ariarne Titmus (1:56.71); Kiah Melverton (1:56.95)	7:48.61	Q
7	1	5	Germany	Annika Bruhn (1:56.94); Marlene Huther (1:57.65); Reva Foos (1:56.18); Celine Rieder (1:59.90)	7:48.67	Q, NR
8	1	4	Denmark	Signe Bro (1:57.11); Sarah Bro (1:59.37); Mie Nielsen (1:55.89); Maj Howardsen (1:59.39)	7:51.76	Q
9	1	1	Czech Republic	Barbora Seemanová (1:58.63); Simona Baumrtová (1:57.33); Barbora Závadová (1:58.15); Martina Elhenická (1:58.78)	7:52.89	Q, NR
10	1	6	Macau	Tan Chi Yan (2:07.03); Lei On Kei (2:10.06); Choi Weng Tong (2:13.81); Long Chi Wai (2:11.10)	8:42.00	Q, NR

=== Final ===
The final was held at 20:18.

Rank	Lane	Nation	Swimmers	Time	Notes
1st place, gold medalist(s)	3	Canada	Katerine Savard (1:55.53); Taylor Ruck (1:51.69); Kennedy Goss (1:54.62); Penny Oleksiak (1:52.05)	7:33.89	AM
2nd place, silver medalist(s)	4	United States	Leah Smith (1:54.87); Mallory Comerford (1:53.32); Sarah Gibson (1:55.43); Madisyn Cox (1:55.03)	7:38.65	
3rd place, bronze medalist(s)	6	Russia	Daria Mullakaeva (1:57.53); Daria Ustinova (1:55.13); Arina Openysheva (1:54.83); Veronika Popova (1:52.44)	7:39.93	NR
4	7	Australia	Brittany Elmslie (1:54.83); Carla Buchanan (1:54.65); Ariarne Titmus (1:55.14); Kiah Melverton (1:55.38)	7:40.00	
5	2	Japan	Tomomi Aoki (1:56.49); Chihiro Igarashi (1:54.93); Aya Takano (1:56.73); Rikako Ikee (1:53.82)	7:41.97	NR
6	5	China	Zhang Yuhan (1:56.50); Ai Yanhan (1:55.77); Dong Jie (1:56.53); Shen Duo (1:53.29)	7:42.09	
7	1	Germany	Annika Bruhn (1:56.79); Reva Foos (1:55.17); Marlene Huther (1:57.14); Celine Rieder (1:59.12)	7:48.22	NR
8	8	Denmark	Signe Bro (1:57.10); Mie Nielsen (1:55.15); Sarah Bro (1:58.37); Maj Howardsen (1:59.33)	7:49.95	
