= Taylor Ruck =

Canadian swimmer (born 2000)

Personal information
- Full name: Taylor Madison Ruck
- National team: Canada
- Born: May 28, 2000 (age 26) Kelowna, British Columbia, Canada
- Height: 184 cm (6 ft 0 in)

Sport
- Sport: Swimming
- Strokes: Freestyle, Backstroke
- Club: High Performance Center Ontario, Scottsdale Aquatic Club
- College team: Stanford University
- Coach: Ben Titley, Kevin Zacher
Medal record
Women's swimming
Representing Canada
Event	1st	2nd	3rd
Olympic Games	0	1	3
World Championships (LC)	0	2	7
World Championships (SC)	2	2	3
Commonwealth Games	1	5	2
Pan Pacific Championships	1	2	7
Total	4	12	22
Olympic Games
Silver medal – second place	2020 Tokyo	4×100 m freestyle
Bronze medal – third place	2016 Rio de Janeiro	4×100 m freestyle
Bronze medal – third place	2016 Rio de Janeiro	4×200 m freestyle
Bronze medal – third place	2020 Tokyo	4×100 m medley
World Championships (LC)
Silver medal – second place	2022 Budapest	4×100 m freestyle
Silver medal – second place	2022 Budapest	4×100 m mixed freestyle
Bronze medal – third place	2019 Gwangju	4×100 m freestyle
Bronze medal – third place	2019 Gwangju	4×200 m freestyle
Bronze medal – third place	2019 Gwangju	4×100 m medley
Bronze medal – third place	2022 Budapest	4×200 m freestyle
Bronze medal – third place	2024 Doha	4×100 m freestyle
Bronze medal – third place	2024 Doha	4×100 m medley
Bronze medal – third place	2025 Singapore	4×100 m mixed medley
World Championships (SC)
Gold medal – first place	2016 Windsor	4×50 m freestyle
Gold medal – first place	2016 Windsor	4×200 m freestyle
Silver medal – second place	2016 Windsor	4×100 m medley
Silver medal – second place	2022 Melbourne	4×200 m freestyle
Bronze medal – third place	2016 Windsor	200 m freestyle
Bronze medal – third place	2022 Melbourne	4×100 m freestyle
Bronze medal – third place	2022 Melbourne	4×100 m medley
Commonwealth Games
Gold medal – first place	2018 Gold Coast	200 m freestyle
Silver medal – second place	2018 Gold Coast	50 m freestyle
Silver medal – second place	2018 Gold Coast	200 m backstroke
Silver medal – second place	2018 Gold Coast	4×100 m freestyle
Silver medal – second place	2018 Gold Coast	4×200 m freestyle
Silver medal – second place	2018 Gold Coast	4×100 m medley
Bronze medal – third place	2018 Gold Coast	100 m freestyle
Bronze medal – third place	2018 Gold Coast	100 m backstroke
Pan Pacific Championships
Gold medal – first place	2018 Tokyo	200 m freestyle
Silver medal – second place	2018 Tokyo	200 m backstroke
Silver medal – second place	2026 Irvine	100 m butterfly
Bronze medal – third place	2018 Tokyo	100 m freestyle
Bronze medal – third place	2018 Tokyo	4×100 m freestyle
Bronze medal – third place	2018 Tokyo	4×200 m freestyle
Bronze medal – third place	2026 Irvine	100 m backstroke
Bronze medal – third place	2026 Irvine	50 m butterfly
Bronze medal – third place	2026 Irvine	4×100 m freestyle
Bronze medal – third place	2026 Irvine	4×100 m mixed medley
World Junior Championships
Gold medal – first place	2015 Singapore	100 m freestyle
Gold medal – first place	2015 Singapore	200 m freestyle
Gold medal – first place	2015 Singapore	4×100 m mixed freestyle
Gold medal – first place	2017 Indianapolis	200 m freestyle
Gold medal – first place	2017 Indianapolis	4×100 m freestyle
Gold medal – first place	2017 Indianapolis	4×200 m freestyle
Gold medal – first place	2017 Indianapolis	4×100 m medley
Gold medal – first place	2017 Indianapolis	4×100 m mixed freestyle
Gold medal – first place	2017 Indianapolis	4×100 m mixed medley
Silver medal – second place	2015 Singapore	4×200 m freestyle
Silver medal – second place	2017 Indianapolis	100 m backstroke
Bronze medal – third place	2015 Singapore	200 m backstroke
Bronze medal – third place	2015 Singapore	4×100 m freestyle

Taylor Madison Ruck (born May 28, 2000) is a Canadian competitive swimmer. She won two Olympic bronze medals as part of Canada's women's 4×100 metre and 4×200 metre freestyle relay teams at the 2016 Summer Olympics in Rio de Janeiro. Ruck won eight medals at the 2018 Commonwealth Games in Gold Coast, Australia. Her eight medal performance of one gold, five silver, and two bronze tied her with three other athletes for the most all-time at a single Commonwealth Games, as well as making her the most decorated Canadian female athlete ever at a single Commonwealth Games. Ruck is the all-time leading medallist at the FINA World Junior Swimming Championships having won nine gold, two silver, and two bronze over the course of the 2015 and 2017 editions.

== Career ==
Ruck won the gold medal in the 100 meter freestyle at the 2015 FINA World Junior Swimming Championships in Singapore, breaking the Championships record in both the heats and the final. She also won the 200 meter freestyle, again in a championship record. She would add a bronze medal in the 200 backstroke, as well as three relay a medals a gold in the mixed 4×100 m free, silver in the 4×200 m free, and a bronze in the women's 4×100 m freestyle event.

=== 2016 season ===
Ruck was suffering from bronchitis during the trials for Canada's Olympic team and did not initially qualify, but officials took her illness into account and named her to the team for the 2016 Summer Olympics.

There, as a sixteen year old Olympian, she swam the last leg in the heats and the second last leg of the finals in the women's 4×100 m relay final for Canada. Ruck competed with Penny Oleksiak, Chantal van Landeghem, Sandrine Mainville, and Michelle Williams and swam to a bronze medal, behind Australia and the United States. After the win Ruck said of "I’m definitely not one to cry easily but I was about to...I feel 110 per cent Canadian now!" The medal was the first Canadian women's freestyle relay medal at the Olympics in 40 years. She became the first athlete born in the 2000s to win an Olympic medal along with fellow Canadian swimmer and relay partner Penny Oleksiak.

Ruck then won her second bronze medal as a part of the 4×200 metres freestyle relay team. She swam in second spot in the heats alongside Katerine Savard, Emily Overholt and Kennedy Goss, and second again in the final event, with Brittany MacLean and Oleksiak replacing Overholt and Goss. She last competed in the 4×100 metres medley, swimming the anchor leg in the trials before being replaced for the finals, where the Canadian team placed fifth.

To end the 2016 season, Ruck and her teammates won a gold medal in the FINA short-course world swimming championships 4 × 200 m freestyle relay. Ruck, swimming the second leg, posted the fastest split time of the final with a 1:51.69. She also won a bronze medal in the individual 200 m freestyle. For the 2017 season, Ruck relocated back to Canada to train at the High Performance Centre – Ontario led by Ben Titley. There she began training with teammates Oleksiak, Toro, Van Landegham, Rebecca Smith, Sandrine Mainville, Kayla Sanchez, and Richard Funk.

=== 2017 season ===
Following her Olympic success in 2016, Ruck swam in the Canadian trials to compete at the 2017 World Aquatics Championships. There she was unable to place higher than fourth in any of the events, meaning she failed to qualify for the Canadian team in any of the events and missed worlds.

Ruck was part of the gold medal 4 × 200 m freestyle 2017 World Junior Swimming Championships team in Indianapolis. In the process the team broke the junior world record and championship record. Ruck would add gold medals and world junior records in both the 4×100 m relay and the 4×100 m medley. She set the world junior record in the girl's 100 m backstroke semis, but would lose the record and the gold medal to Regan Smith while winning the silver medal in the event. While swimming in the 200 m freestyle event, she lowered the championship record twice when she set a 1:57.08. Ruck also set a 100 m championship record while leading off the 4×100 m relay when she swam to a 53.63.

=== 2018 season ===
Ruck competed as part of Canada's 2018 Commonwealth Games team in her buildup to the 2020 Summer Olympics. The first day of competition in the Gold Coast was in fact a golden one when Ruck out-swam Ariarne Titmus and Emma McKeon to win the 200m freestyle in a Commonwealth Games record 1:54.81. The time was also a Canadian record. Later that night she added to her total with a silver in the 4×100 m freestyle relay together with Penny Oleksiak, Kayla Sanchez, and Alexia Zevnik. The next day Ruck kept amassing medals, winning three more Saturday evening. She started the night tying for silver in the 50 m freestyle event medaling with the Campbell sisters. Next Ruck won a bronze in the 100 m backstroke behind winner, teammate, and world record holder Kylie Masse. She would cap the night with a silver in the 4×200 m freestyle relay.

She went on to win a silver behind Masse in the 200 m backstroke, finishing ahead of Emily Seebohm, and a bronze medal in the 100 m backstroke. On the final day of competition, Ruck tied the Commonwealth Games record for total medals at a single games with eight, when she anchored the 4×100 m medley relay team to a silver medal. Her eight medals tied Canadian Ralph Hutton, and Australians Susie O'Neill and Emily Seebohm; it also made her the most decorated Canadian female athlete ever at a single Commonwealth Games. After her gold, five silvers, and two bronze medal performance at the games Ruck said that "I'm just so honoured to be able to win that many medals. This meet has been so much fun, and I'm so glad to finish it with these girls by my side."

Following the Commonwealth Games, Ruck carried her success that season into the 2018 Pan Pacific Swimming Championships in Tokyo. Ruck began the meet with a bronze medal in the women's 100 m freestyle, while adding bronzes in the 4×100 and 4 × 200 m freestyle relays. She then beat American star and fellow Stanford swimmer Katie Ledecky in the 200 m freestyle, leading from start to finish. CBC commentator Byron MacDonald said of Ruck's race and form that "anytime you beat the best female swimmer in the world… it's a huge step forward." Ruck finished the competition in the 200 m backstroke where she out-touched Regan Smith at the wall for silver in the event. This gave her five medals, the most by any Canadian at a single Pan Pacific championships. Ruck said of swimming in Tokyo, the site of the 2020 Olympics, that "this sets my expectations higher. I just love Japan and hopefully I'll be able to come back here in two years."

=== 2019 season ===
Competing as part of the Canadian team at the 2019 World Aquatics Championships in Gwangju, Ruck placed fifth in both the 100 m freestyle and 200 m backstroke events, and withdrew from the 200 m freestyle beforehand. Again a part of the Canadian women's relay teams, she won three bronze medals in the 4 × 100 m freestyle, 4 × 200 m freestyle, and 4 × 100 m medley relays, only swimming the freestyle leg of the heats in the latter before being replaced by Oleksiak in the final.

=== 2020–21 seasons ===
Ruck took a year off from Stanford to train in Toronto with the Canadian national team under Ben Titley in anticipation of the 2020 Summer Olympics in Tokyo. Around this time, she began to suffer from a number of injuries and mental health struggles with depression and eating disorder. The effects of these were aggravated by the onset of the COVID-19 pandemic, which resulted in the Olympics being delayed by a full year, as well as the city of Toronto being largely locked down, leading to greatly increased isolation. She subsequently began taking online courses at Stanford, which she considered to help. Her coach Titley would later say she had had "a really tough couple of years" and praised her resilience.

As a result of these challenges, Ruck performances going into the 2021 season were noticeably below her personal bests set in 2018 and 2019. While she was pre-selected for the 100 m freestyle event at the Olympics based on her 2019 World Championships result, she would subsequently drop out of this event, with her space being taken by Kayla Sanchez, who had finished second at the Canadian Olympic trials, where Ruck had finished fifth. She also qualified to compete in the backstroke events, and was named to the Canadian relay teams.

Ruck swam in the heats for the 4 × 100 m freestyle relay, but was replaced with Maggie Mac Neil in the event final. She shared in the silver medal won by the Canadian team. Ruck had the ninth-fastest time in the semi-finals of the 100 m backstroke, missing qualification to the final by 0.15 seconds. She went on to place sixth in the heats and seventh in the semi-finals of the 200 m backstroke, qualifying to her first individual Olympic final, where she placed sixth overall. Ruck expressed satisfaction with this, having noted that "this meet has been more downs than ups." Finally, Ruck performed the backstroke leg of the 4 × 100 m medley in the heats, helping the Canadian team to qualify in first place to the final. Kylie Masse replaced Ruck in the final, where they won the bronze medal, Ruck's second of the Games and fourth Olympic medal overall.

=== 2022 season ===
Following the Olympic season, Ruck returned to Stanford and enjoyed solid results in the college swimming season, ending with a gold medal in the 200 yard freestyle at the 2022 NCAA Division I Championships. She announced afterward that she would return to Stanford for a final year.

Beginning the 2022 World Aquatics Championships in the 4 × 100 m freestyle relay, Ruck was part of Canada's silver medal-winning team, a first for Canadian women at the World Championships. Her 52.92 split was her fastest time in several years, with SwimSwam noting "her improvements this year are a step forth in her journey." After placing fourteenth in the heats of the 200 m freestyle, she was sixth overall in the semi-finals, qualifying for the event final. She finished sixth, saying "I did the best I could and I'm going to use this as a building block." Ruck swam in both the heats and the event final of the 4 × 200 m freestyle relay, where the Canadian team won the bronze medal. Ruck swam the third leg for the Canadian team in the heats of the 4 × 100 m mixed freestyle relay, helping them qualify to the event final in second place. She was replaced by Kayla Sanchez in the final, but shared in the team's silver medal win.

Ruck finished the year at the 2022 FINA World Swimming Championships in Melbourne, winning three relay medals.

=== 2023 season ===
In her final season competing for Stanford, Ruck successfully defended her title in the women's 200 yard freestyle event at the 2023 NCAA Division I Women's Swimming and Diving Championships. She had initially intended to compete at the national swimming trials a few weeks later, but after resuming training in Toronto she determined that she had a "need to unplug for a little while, so I can come back refreshed and ready to be at my best in the pool." She was nevertheless named to the Canadian delegation to the 2023 World Aquatics Championships. Ruck subsequently broke her hand in a skateboarding accident.

Ruck recovered sufficiently in order to participate in the World Aquatics Championships, and was part of the Canadian 4 × 100 m freestyle relay team; with key member Oleksiak absent, the team finished seventh. She later participated in the heats of the mixed 4 × 100 m freestyle relay.

=== 2024 season ===
In advance of the Olympic season, Ruck moved to train at Arizona State University, and announced that she would forego participation in NCAA competition while preparing. She said she would primarily focus on preparation for the 100 metre freestyle and associated relay events. While many of Canada's top swimmers opted to skip the 2024 World Aquatics Championships in Doha, Ruck was named to the team. On the first day of swimming finals, Ruck participated in the 4 × 100 m freestyle relay, recording a 53.26 split on the anchor leg and leading the Canadian team to a bronze medal. Ruck remarked that "watching my teammates get in there and race hypes me up every time. Usually I don't go last so going last gave me a bit of that, which the coaches were planning on happening. I'm just so grateful again to share this medal with them." She swam the anchor leg for the 4 × 200 m freestyle relay team, which finished sixth. Ruck also swam the freestyle leg in the 4 × 100 m medley relay, winning a bronze medal win.

At the Canadian Olympic trials, Ruck came second in the 50 m freestyle event, qualifying to her third Olympic team. She was fourth in the 100 m freestyle and third in the 100 m backstroke. Competing at the 2024 Summer Olympics in Paris, she reached the 50 m freestyle semi-finals, coming thirteenth there and missing the final. She also swam with the Canadian team in the 4 × 100 m freestyle relay, and in the heats of the mixed 4 × 100 m medley relay.

=== 2025 season ===
Following the Paris Olympics, Ruck debated whether to continue competing, but ultimately decided in favour of doing so, while also exploring coaching.

At the 2025 World Aquatics Championships in Singapore, the Canadian team in the 4×100 me freestyle relay finished ninth in heats, missing the event final. She reached the final of the 100 m backstroke and finished seventh. Ruck then won a bronze medal swimming the freestyle leg for the Canadian team in the mixed 4 × 100 m medley relay. Her split of 52.94 improved on her time from the national swimming trials by over a second and a half. Ruck indicated that she was uncertain whether she would aim for the 2028 Summer Olympics, saying: "It is a big decision, and I think that's what I'm excited and nervous about in my late 20s: figuring out where life takes you, and having your priorities straight."

== Personal bests ==
=== Long course (50 m pool) ===
Event	Time	Venue	Date	Notes
50 m freestyle	24.26	2018 Commonwealth Games, Gold Coast Aquatic Centre, Southport	April 7, 2018	NR
100 m freestyle	52.72	2018 Pan Pacific Championships, Tastumi International Swimming Centre, Tokyo	August 10, 2018	
200 m freestyle	1:54.44	2018 Pan Pacific Championships, Tastumi International Swimming Centre, Tokyo	August 9, 2018	NR, CR
50 m backstroke	28.99	2018 TYR Pro Swim Series, Austin	January 13, 2018	
100 m backstroke	58.55	2019 Canadian Swimming Trials, Toronto Pan Am Sports Centre, Toronto	April 3, 2019	
200 m backstroke	2:06.36	2018 TYR Pro Swim Series, Georgia Tech Aquatic Center, Atlanta	March 2, 2018	
200 m IM	2:11.16	2018 TYR Pro Swim Series, Georgia Tech Aquatic Center, Atlanta	March 3, 2018	

Legend: WR – World record; AM – Americas record; CR – Commonwealth record; NR – Canadian record;
Records not set in finals: h – heat; sf – semifinal; r – relay 1st leg; rh – relay heat 1st leg; b – B final; † – en route to final mark; so – swim-off; tt – time trial

=== Short course (25 m pool) ===
Event	Time	Venue	Date	Notes
50 m freestyle	24.08	2017 Lausanne Cup, Lausanne, Switzerland	December 21, 2017	
100 m freestyle	52.09	2017 Lausanne Cup, Lausanne, Switzerland	December 20, 2017	
200 m freestyle	1:52.50	2016 World Championships, WFCU Centre, Windsor	December 6, 2016	NR
400 m freestyle	4:06.69	2016 World Championships, WFCU Centre, Windsor	December 9, 2016	
100 m backstroke	56.99	2017 Lausanne Cup, Lausanne, Switzerland	December 21, 2017	
200 m backstroke	2:01.66	2017 Lausanne Cup, Lausanne, Switzerland	December 20, 2017	NR

== Personal life ==
Ruck's family moved to Scottsdale, Arizona, U.S., before she was one year old. She does not hold American citizenship and continues to spend time in Canada while visiting family in Kelowna, Winnipeg, and Vancouver. She attended Chaparral High School in Scottsdale. She is a Stanford University alumni.
