= Swimming at the 2015 Pan American Games – Women's 4 × 100 metre freestyle relay =

Women's 4 × 100 metre freestyle relay at the 2015 Pan American Games
- Venue: CIBC Pan Am/Parapan Am Aquatics Centre and Field House
- Dates: July 14 (preliminaries and finals)
- Competitors: 42 from 8 nations
- Winning time: 3:36.80

Medalists
Gold medal	Sandrine Mainville, Michele Williams, Katerine Savard, Chantal van Landeghem, Alyson Ackman, Dominique Bouchard	Canada
Silver medal	Allison Schmitt, Amanda Weir, Madison Kennedy, Natalie Coughlin, Katie Meili, Kelsi Worrell	United States
Bronze medal	Larissa Oliveira, Graciele Herrmann, Etiene Medeiros, Daynara de Paula, Daiane Oliveira, Manuella Lyrio	Brazil

The women's 4 × 100 metre freestyle relay competition of the swimming events at the 2015 Pan American Games took place on July 14 at the CIBC Pan Am/Parapan Am Aquatics Centre and Field House in Toronto, Canada. The defending Pan American Games champion is the United States.

This race consisted of eight lengths of the pool. Each of the four swimmers completed two lengths of the pool. The first swimmer had to touch the wall before the second could leave the starting block.

== Records ==
Prior to this competition, the existing world and Pan American Games records were as follows:

World record	Australia (AUS); Bronte Campbell (53.15); Melanie Schlanger (52.76); Emma McKeon (52.91); Cate Campbell (52.16)	3:30.98	Glasgow, Scotland	July 24, 2014
Pan American Games record	United States (USA); Madison Kennedy (55.55); Elizabeth Pelton (55.25); Amanda Kendall (54.62); Erika Erndl (55.24)	3:40.66	Guadalajara, Mexico	October 15, 2011

The following new records were set during this competition.

Date	Event	Nation	Time	Record
14 July	Heat 1	United States	3:37.28	GR
14 July	Final	Canada	3:36.80	GR

== Schedule ==
All times are Eastern Time Zone (UTC-4).

Date	Time	Round
July 14, 2015	11:02	Heats
July 14, 2015	20:22	Final

== Results ==
=== Heats ===
The first round was held on July 14. As only eight teams had entered, the heats served as a ranking round with all eight teams advancing to the final.

Rank	Heat	Lane	Name	Nationality	Time	Notes
1	1	4	Katie Meili (55.51); Allison Schmitt (53.82); Madison Kennedy (53.92); Kelsi Worrell (54.03)	United States	3:37.28	Q, GR
2	1	5	Sandrine Mainville (54.89); Alyson Ackman (55.68); Katerine Savard (55.40); Dominique Bouchard (56.86)	Canada	3:42.83	Q
3	1	3	Daiane Oliveira (56.93); Manuella Lyrio (56.95); Etiene Medeiros (56.17); Daynara de Paula (56.68)	Brazil	3:46.73	Q
4	1	7	Carolina Colorado Henao (57.39); María Álvarez (57.48); Jessica Camposano (58.21); Isabella Arcila (56.53)	Colombia	3:49.61	Q
5	1	6	Jeserik Pinto (57.23); Andrea Garrido (58.35); Mercedes Toledo (57.64); Yennifer Marquez (56.67)	Venezuela	3:49.89	Q
6	1	2	Natalia Jaspeado (58.79); Moniika Gonzalez-Hermosillo (57.35); Natasha Gvakharia (57.47); Maria Hichaud (58.00)	Mexico	3:51.61	Q
7	1	8	Kaori Miyahara (59.63); Andrea Cedrón (58.34); Jessica Cattaneo (58.30); McKenna DeBever (58.17)	Peru	3:54.44	Q, NR
8	1	1	Breanna Roman (57.98); Alia Atkinson (57.09); Trudian Patrick (1:03.56); Danielle Boothe (1:00.46)	Jamaica	3:59.09	Q

=== Final ===
The final was held on July 14.

Rank	Lane	Name	Nationality	Time	Notes
1st place, gold medalist(s)	5	Sandrine Mainville (54.43); Michelle Williams (54.42); Katerine Savard (54.53); Chantal van Landeghem (53.42)	Canada	3:36.80	GR, NR
2nd place, silver medalist(s)	4	Allison Schmitt (54.46); Amanda Weir (54.79); Madison Kennedy (53.89); Natalie Coughlin (53.87)	United States	3:37.01	
3rd place, bronze medalist(s)	3	Larissa Oliveira (54.67); Graciele Herrmann (54.72); Etiene Medeiros (53.99); Daynara de Paula (54.01)	Brazil	3:37.39	SA
4	2	Yennifer Marquez (56.60); Andreina Pinto (56.27); Jeserik Pinto (56.77); Arlene Semeco (56.60)	Venezuela	3:46.24	NR
5	6	Carolina Colorado Henao (57.28); María Álvarez (57.26); Jessica Camposano (57.13); Isabella Arcila (55.63)	Colombia	3:47.30	NR
6	7	Maria Hichaud (57.48); Natasha Gvakharia (57.40); Esther González (56.83); Liliana Ibáñez (55.94)	Mexico	3:47.65	NR
7	1	Kaori Miyahara (59.28); Andrea Cedrón (58.11); Jessica Cattaneo (57.74); McKenna DeBever (57.30)	Peru	3:52.43	NR
8	8	Breanna Roman (58.03); Alia Atkinson (55.77); Danielle Boothe (1:00.22); Trudian Patrick (1:01.99)	Jamaica	3:56.01	
