= Penny Oleksiak =

Canadian swimmer (born 2000)

Penny Oleksiak OLY
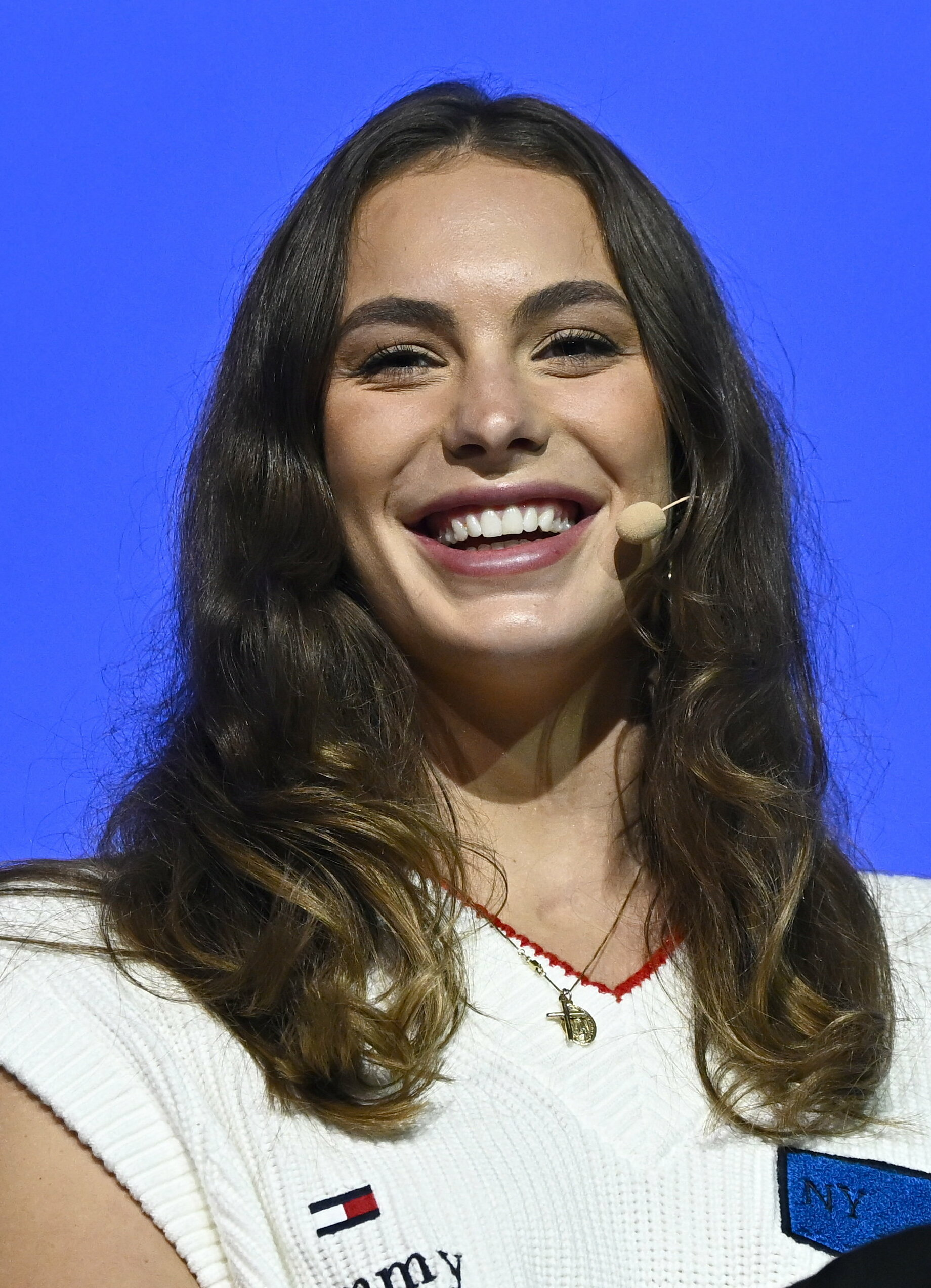
- Oleksiak in 2023

Personal information
- Born: Penelope Kwiatkowski Cassels Oleksiak; June 13, 2000 (age 26) Toronto, Ontario, Canada
- Height: 1.86 m (6 ft 1 in)

Sport
- Country: Canada
- Sport: Swimming
- Strokes: Freestyle, butterfly
- Club: Energy Standard; Toronto Swim Club, High Performance Centre – Ontario
- Coach: Bill O'Toole, Ben Titley, Ryan Mallette, Jeff Julian
Medal record
Women's swimming
Representing Canada
Event	1st	2nd	3rd
Olympic Games	1	2	4
World Championships (LC)	0	2	7
World Championships (SC)	2	2	3
World Junior Championships	6	4	1
Total	9	10	15
Olympic Games
Gold medal – first place	2016 Rio de Janeiro	100 m freestyle
Silver medal – second place	2016 Rio de Janeiro	100 m butterfly
Silver medal – second place	2020 Tokyo	4×100 m freestyle
Bronze medal – third place	2016 Rio de Janeiro	4×100 m freestyle
Bronze medal – third place	2016 Rio de Janeiro	4×200 m freestyle
Bronze medal – third place	2020 Tokyo	200 m freestyle
Bronze medal – third place	2020 Tokyo	4×100 m medley
World Championships (LC)
Silver medal – second place	2022 Budapest	4×100 m freestyle
Silver medal – second place	2022 Budapest	4×100 m mixed freestyle
Bronze medal – third place	2017 Budapest	4×100 m mixed freestyle
Bronze medal – third place	2017 Budapest	4×100 m mixed medley
Bronze medal – third place	2019 Gwangju	4×100 m freestyle
Bronze medal – third place	2019 Gwangju	4×200 m freestyle
Bronze medal – third place	2019 Gwangju	4×100 m medley
Bronze medal – third place	2022 Budapest	4×200 m freestyle
Bronze medal – third place	2022 Budapest	4×100 m medley
World Championships (SC)
Gold medal – first place	2016 Windsor	4x50 m freestyle
Gold medal – first place	2016 Windsor	4×200 m freestyle
Silver medal – second place	2016 Windsor	4×100 m medley
Silver medal – second place	2024 Budapest	4×50 m mixed freestyle
Bronze medal – third place	2016 Windsor	100 m freestyle
Bronze medal – third place	2024 Budapest	4×100 m freestyle
Bronze medal – third place	2024 Budapest	4×100 m mixed medley
Commonwealth Games
Silver medal – second place	2018 Gold Coast	4x100 m freestyle
Silver medal – second place	2018 Gold Coast	4×200 m freestyle
Silver medal – second place	2018 Gold Coast	4×100 m medley
World Junior Championships
Gold medal – first place	2015 Singapore	4×100 m mixed freestyle
Gold medal – first place	2017 Indianapolis	4×200 m freestyle
Gold medal – first place	2017 Indianapolis	4×100 m freestyle
Gold medal – first place	2017 Indianapolis	4×100 m medley
Gold medal – first place	2017 Indianapolis	4×100 m mixed freestyle
Gold medal – first place	2017 Indianapolis	4×100 m mixed medley
Silver medal – second place	2015 Singapore	100 m freestyle
Silver medal – second place	2015 Singapore	50 m butterfly
Silver medal – second place	2015 Singapore	100 m butterfly
Silver medal – second place	2015 Singapore	4×200 m freestyle
Bronze medal – third place	2015 Singapore	4×100 m freestyle

Penelope Oleksiak (born June 13, 2000) is a Canadian competitive swimmer. Nicknamed "Magic Penny", she is one of Canada's most decorated Olympians. Oleksiak rose to fame during the 2016 Summer Olympics, where she became the first Canadian to win four medals in the same Summer Games, and the country's youngest Olympic champion with her gold medal win in the 100 m freestyle. She was the first athlete born in the 2000s to claim an Olympic gold medal in an individual event. Her success led to her being awarded the 2016 Lou Marsh Trophy as Canada's top athlete, the Bobbie Rosenfeld Award as Canada's top female athlete for 2016, and a member of the Canadian Press team of the year. Five years later she won three additional medals at the 2020 Summer Olympics, breaking the national record for Olympic medals; joined in 2024 by sprinter Andre De Grasse, with seven Olympic medals each.

Oleksiak is widely considered as the face of the Canadian women's swimming team in the 2010s, she is also Canada's most decorated athlete at the World Aquatics Championships, and a multi-medallist at the World Swimming Championships, World Junior Championships, and Commonwealth Games.

She is the current junior world and Canadian record holder in the 100 m freestyle, and she formerly held the world junior and Canadian records in the 100 m butterfly, as well as the Olympic record in the 100 m freestyle alongside Simone Manuel.

Oleksiak is currently serving a two-year competition suspension set to expire in July 2027 for an anti-doping rule violation.

== Career ==
After learning to swim at a neighbour's pool, Oleksiak took up the sport at the age of 9 encouraged by her father. She had also taken up gymnastics and competitive dance. Oleksiak attempted to join several swim clubs in Toronto, but was rejected due to having trouble swimming the length of pool. She was eventually taken in by coach Gary Nolden at the Toronto Olympian Swim Team, where she gained the foundation that started her swimming career. Oleksiak said, "The coach there really helped me. He had a lot of faith in me. If I hadn't gone to that club, I don't think I would be where I am today." Within a year, a race by Oleksiak at the University of Toronto drew the attention of coach Ben Titley, who would go on to lead Canada's Olympic team. Titley would begin working with her, sporadically at first, then on a monthly and weekly basis. As a 14-year-old at the 2014 Canadian Age Group Championships, Oleksiak won 10 individual medals, five gold, three silver and two bronze, setting a personal best in every race, and then tacked on three relay golds.

Extra investments came as the data analytics division of Canadian Tire appointed Oleksiak, whose top FINA ranking at the time was 319th, as a possible Olympic medallist in the 2020 Summer Games.

=== 2015–16 seasons ===
First indications of great potential for Oleksiak were identified when, six weeks after fracturing her elbow in a cycling accident, she was still able to win six medals at the 2015 FINA World Junior Swimming Championships. This included a gold in the mixed 4 × 100 m freestyle relay; silver in her signature 100 m freestyle event; silver in the 50 and 100 m butterfly; a silver in the 4 × 200 m relay and a bronze in the 4 × 100 m freestyle events.

Her next goal was to qualify for the 2016 Summer Olympics in Rio de Janeiro as part of the Canadian national team; there she set the Junior world record in qualifying for the 100 m freestyle. After winning the race she said "Being able to get the world junior record means quite a bit to me". Oleksiak also beat Chantal Van Landeghem's Canadian record in the process; Van Landeghem joined Oleksiak in the 100 and 4 × 100 m freestyle events for the Olympics. Oleksiak also set the Canadian and World Junior records in the 100 m butterfly en route to the Olympics in that event. Before the Olympics, Oleksiak had risen to 49th in the 100-metre freestyle rankings and 37th in the 100-metre butterfly, and the Canadian Tire analysts appointed her to possibly win a medal in Rio.

==== 2016 Summer Olympics ====
Oleksiak would compete for Canada's swimming team at the Rio 2016 Olympics in five races. Her competition began on day one. In the heats of the 100 m butterfly, she broke the national record and world junior record with a time of 56.73 on her way to the semi-finals. Oleksiak also anchored the final leg of the women's 4×100 m freestyle relay team with Taylor Ruck, Chantal van Landeghem, Sandrine Mainville, and Michelle Williams with the latter only swimming in the heat. In the final of the relay event she held on to the third position against the United States and Australia, winning Canada's first Olympic medal in the women's freestyle relay in 40 years. After the race, the 16-year-old said, "No one expected this of Canada coming into the meet, but now that we are here, people are going to be surprised at what we do."

2016 Summer Olympics
Bronze medal – third place	4×100 m freestyle	3:32.89 (NR)
Silver medal – second place	100 m butterfly	56.46 (WJR)(NR)
Bronze medal – third place	4×200 m freestyle	7:45.39 (NR)
Gold medal – first place	100 m freestyle	52.70 (OR)(WJR)(AM)

The next night she competed in the 100 m butterfly final. Oleksiak started out fast, touching the halfway wall in third before finishing characteristically strong in second place, winning the silver medal. She again bettered her world junior record and Canadian record in the 100 m butterfly in the process. Oleksiak became the first Canadian to ever win a medal on each of the first two days of the Olympics. With the win, she exclaimed that "I'm just happy that I made Canada proud and getting to look up into the stands and find my parents, it's just amazing for me and it's such a great feeling."

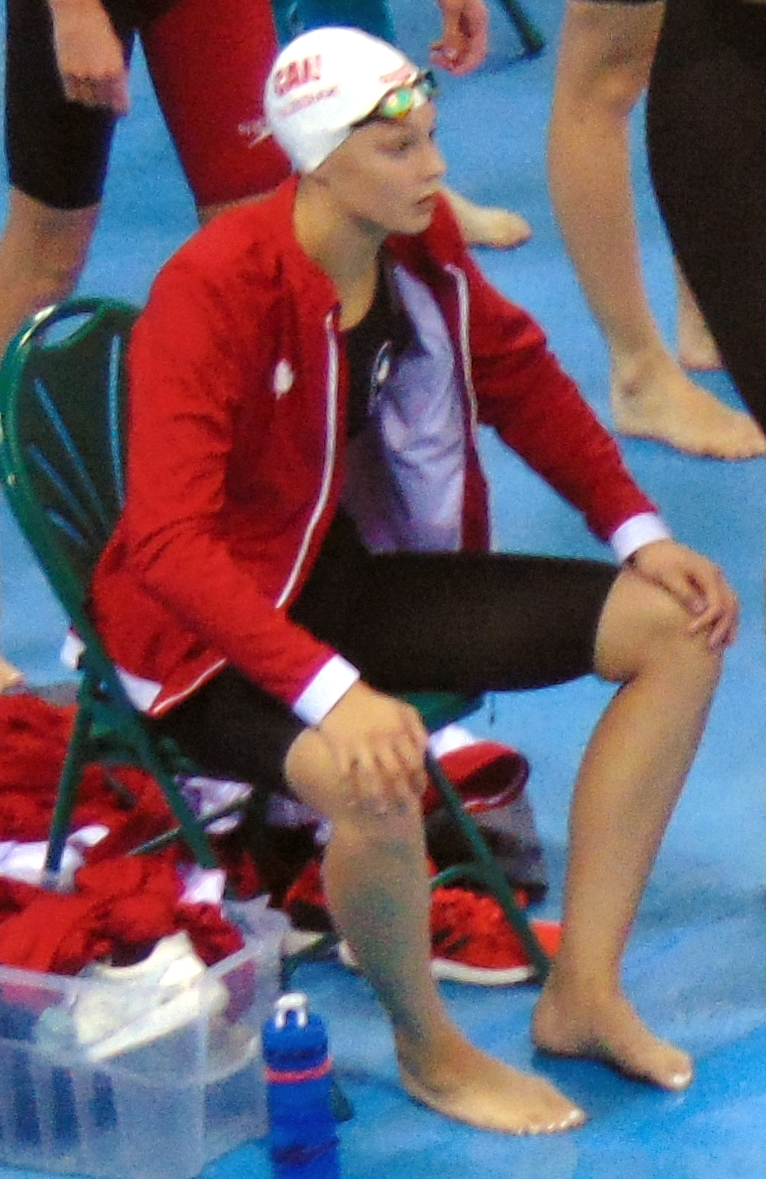
Oleksiak at the 2016 Summer Olympics.

Returning to the pool on day five, Oleksiak again had a record-breaking qualifier followed by a relay medal. She broke the world junior record of the 100 m freestyle with 52.72, the second fastest time of the qualifying heats, and anchored the 4×200 m freestyle relay, again winning the bronze (along with Katerine Savard, Taylor Ruck, and Brittany MacLean). Oleksiak's leg time of 1:54.94 was the 4th fastest in the field after the three medallists of the 200 m freestyle.

On day six, Oleksiak was seventh at the 50-metre turn of the 100 m freestyle, and eventually surged for a gold medal finish, tied with Simone Manuel and setting an Olympic record of 52.70. Oleksiak is the youngest Canadian to become an Olympic champion, the first to win four Summer Olympics medals in the same edition, and has the second most medals of the country in a single edition after Cindy Klassen in the 2006 Winter Olympics. She is also the first athlete born in the 2000s to win an individual Olympic gold. Day eight marked Oleksiak's fifth Olympic race and the only one she did not medal in that edition, being the butterfly swimmer of the 4 × 100 m medley relay that finished in fifth place. It was announced the morning of the closing ceremony that Oleksiak would be Canada's flag bearer for the event. Just days before the closing ceremony, Penny quietly returned to her home in Toronto for two days to go to Canada's Wonderland with her friends, before heading back to Rio.

==== 2016 World Swimming Championships ====
In December 2016 Oleksiak participated in the short course world championships in the Canadian city of Windsor. As the event was her first international competition following the Olympics, in front of her own crowd, Oleksiak was the centre of attentions of fans and media. Oleksiak won a bronze medal in the women's 100-metre freestyle on the third day of competition, breaking her 3rd World Junior record, and two days later helped the Canadian team win gold in the 4 × 200-metre freestyle relays. In the final day of competition, Oleksiak anchored Canada to another gold, in the 4 × 50-metre freestyle relay, and a silver medal at the 4 × 100-metre medley relay. Canada also finished third in the 4 × 100-metre freestyle relay, but wound up disqualified.

As a result of her performances at the 2016 Summer Olympics and the 2016 short course championships Oleksiak was awarded the Lou Marsh Award as Canada's top athlete of the year and was named CBC's athlete of the year as well. She was also given the Bobbie Rosenfeld Award as Canada's female athlete of the year, and was named in the team of the year, anchoring the Canadian women's swim team in Rio and Windsor.

=== 2017 season ===
Oleksiak's first competition in 2017 was the Arena Pro Swim Series in Mesa, Arizona, held in March. Hindered by injuries, she finished fourth in the 100 m freestyle. Oleksiak had troubles with a shoulder injury for most of the year before suffering a concussion when she was hit in the head with a medicine ball in the gym. Despite this she had more success at the Team Canada trials one month later, winning the 100m freestyle and butterfly races and earning spots for both in the 2017 World Aquatics Championships.

At the world championships Oleksiak anchored the team in the 4 x 100 m relay, though the team finished just off the podium in fourth place. In the 100 m butterfly Oleksiak just missed the podium getting fourth place when she swam in 56.94, followed by 5th in 50 m fly (25.62, a Canadian record), and 6th in the 100 m freestyle (52.94). However, she won two bronze medals in the mixed relays, after swimming the butterfly leg of the mixed 4 × 100 m medley – with the Canadian team tied for bronze with the Chinese team after Yuri Kisil swam the anchor leg - and as anchor of the 4 × 100 m freestyle.

Oleksiak competed at the World Junior Swimming Championships in Indianapolis. Oleksiak did not participate in any individual events, but swam in all five possible relay events helping Canada to win all five gold medals, breaking the junior world record and championship record in four of them. Following the junior championships Oleksiak switched coaches from Ben Titley to Bill O'Toole, her original age group coach in the Toronto Swim Club.

=== 2018–19 seasons ===
In September 2017, Oleksiak was named to Canada's 2018 Commonwealth Games team. While unsuccessful in the individual races, Oleksiak won three silvers in the relays.

Despite qualifying wins at the Canadian Swim Trials, Oleksiak opted not to compete in the 2018 Pan Pacific Swimming Championships in August, instead resting before resuming training in September. She would later say this was necessary as a way of dealing with the pressures of fame after the Rio Olympics, having found that "there was a lot of pressure behind my name. It wasn't really enjoyable for me, and no time was ever really good enough for me." She subsequently returned to training with Ben Titley at the national team training centre.

In the autumn of 2019 Oleksiak was member of the inaugural International Swimming League swimming for the Energy Standard Swim Club, who won the team title in Las Vegas, Nevada, in December.

With the onset of the COVID-19 pandemic in March 2020, Oleksiak took an enforced break from training, having no access to the pool for four months. She would subsequently cite this as an opportunity to rethink her approach to training, contemplating that on return "I knew that we would just be head-down training, and we weren't going to really have any racing opportunities, so I knew I had to change my mindset. Now, I love training, and I find a lot of joy in looking at technique stuff." The 2020 Summer Olympics in Tokyo were delayed by a full year. She also became the first female global ambassador for Phelps Brand, a swim gear company co-founded by famed Olympian Michael Phelps. Oleksiak called Phelps a valuable mentor.

=== 2020 Summer Olympics ===
2020 Summer Olympics
Silver medal – second place	4×100 m freestyle	3:32.78
Bronze medal – third place	200 m freestyle	1:54.70
Bronze medal – third place	4x100 m medley	3:52.60 (NR)

Appearing at the Canadian Olympic swim trials for her first proper competition since the pandemic, Oleksiak won the 100 m event with a time of 52.89 seconds, her fastest since the Rio Olympics and the fourth-best women's 100 m time to that point in the year. She came second at the 200 m trial, finishing behind 14-year-old training partner Summer McIntosh. Oleksiak joked afterward "I love Summer. I hate training with Summer." On June 24, 2021, Oleksiak was named to Canada's 2020 Olympic team.

Oleksiak began her Olympics swimming the anchor leg for Canada in the 4×100 m freestyle relay. The team qualified for the final in third place and when Oleksiak dove in to swim the last 100 m she was behind familiar rival Simone Manuel but managed to overtake her in the last touch for second place to win Canada's first medal of the games. Oleksiak next competed in the 200 m freestyle, an event she had not participated in during Rio Olympics. She had the fourth-fastest time in the heats, but only sixth in the semi-finals. In the event final, she set a new personal best time of 1:54.70 to take the bronze medal. This was her sixth Olympic medal, making her the most decorated Summer Olympian in Canadian history, and tying her with Clara Hughes and Cindy Klassen for the most Olympic medals won by a Canadian.

Oleksiak was again part of the Canadian team in the 4×200 m freestyle relay, but despite breaking the Canadian record in the event final, the team finished in fourth place, one ordinal lower than their bronze medal performance in Rio. She next competed in the 100 m freestyle, where she had won gold four years prior. Qualifying through the heats and semi-finals to the final round, she set a new personal best and national record with a 52.59-second final performance, finishing fourth behind bronze medallist Cate Campbell by 0.07 seconds. She described her turn as "frustrating", but "it's still fourth in the world so I'm not complaining." This was Oleksiak's highest placement in a major individual 100 m contest since her gold medal in Rio.

Her final event of the Games, and thus her final chance in Tokyo to break the national record for Olympic medals, was the 4 × 100 m medley relay, where the Canadian team had finished fifth five years earlier. Oleksiak had performed the butterfly leg of the relay in Rio, but in Tokyo that was assigned to Maggie Mac Neil, with Oleksiak anchoring the freestyle leg. They won the bronze medal and set a new national record in the process, with Oleksiak's 52.26 time being the second-fastest in the freestyle segment of the race. Reflecting on her becoming Canada's most-decorated Olympian, she said she preferred not to have achieved the result on an individual event, as it "makes it ten times sweeter knowing that I've accomplished this history with girls that are also making history."

=== 2022 season ===
Ben Titley, longtime coach of Canada's high performance program, unexpectedly left his post before the start of the 2022 season. Oleksiak, who had worked with Titley for most of the preceding ten years, acknowledged the change was "different" now, but said she had "a lot of faith and trust" in new head coach Ryan Mallette. Her preparations for the 2022 swimming season were complicated by contracting COVID-19 in early March, three weeks before the Canadian swimming trials. She nevertheless finished second in the 200 m race, behind Summer McIntosh and ahead of Taylor Ruck. She was second as well in the 100 m trial, 0.02 behind Kayla Sanchez.

Beginning the 2022 World Aquatics Championships in the 4×100 m freestyle relay, Oleksiak was part of Canada's silver medal-winning team, a first for Canadian women at the World Championships. Her time of 52.51 was the fastest for any swimmer in the event. Oleksiak posted the third-fastest time in the heats of the 200 m freestyle, but was disqualified in the semi-final after starting too quickly off the blocks. She said afterward that she had known the error before hitting the water, noting she had "never false started before in my life. Hopefully it never happens again." On June 22, she won her second medal of the championships in the 4×200 m freestyle relay, where the Canadian team finished third. On the same day, Oleksiak competed in the heats and semi-finals of the 100 m freestyle, qualifying to the event final in fourth place. She finished fourth in the event final, which she said was "a bit frustrating," noting another missed turn. She then recorded a personal best split time of 52.11 swimming the anchor leg in the 4×100 m mixed freestyle relay, taking the third-place Canadian team into the silver medal position in the final stretch. This was Oleksiak's eighth World medal, tying Ryan Cochrane as the most-decorated Canadian swimmer at those championships. She then won a record ninth medal as part of the Canadian team in the 4×100 m medley relay. On her success, noting that all her medals were in relay events, Oleksiak said it was "obvious at this point I wouldn't be here without the team, so it feels weird to claim that title on my own. I feel really lucky to be part of Team Canada."

Oleksiak announced that she would not compete at the 2022 Commonwealth Games, citing the compression of the international swimming calendar as a result of the pandemic. Later in the summer, she suffered a meniscus tear while vacationing in Florida. She immediately underwent knee surgery at Women's College Hospital in Toronto to repair it, and stated that the recovery process was "probably about to be the longest and most tentative" of her career.

=== 2023 season ===
Oleksiak did not attend the national swim trials while continuing to rehabilitate her knee, but was nevertheless provisionally named to the Canadian delegation for the 2023 World Aquatics Championships. She made her return to competition in May on the Mare Nostrum tour in Barcelona. However, she subsequently announced her withdrawal from the World Championships, citing both her ongoing knee recovery and a new shoulder ailment.

On September 12, it was announced that Oleksiak had moved to train under coach Jeff Julian in Mission Viejo, California. She competed at the 2023 U.S. Open Swimming Championships in November, but sustained a new knee injury there that would subsequently require surgery.

=== 2024 season ===
Following knee surgery recovery, Oleksiak made her return to competition at the inaugural edition of the Canadian Swimming Open. In advance of the event, she said that her recent experiences and new training environment had revived her love for swimming, and she now envisioned competing through to the 2028 Summer Olympics in Los Angeles: "I'm really happy with where I'm at right now and what I'm trying to do is going to be transcending the sport. Right now I'm content with where I'm at with my life and what I've accomplished and what I want to do in the future." In her first event at the Open, Oleksiak posted a 1:59.75 time in the final of the 200 m freestyle, which said "felt pretty good," adding "I just wanted to be under two minutes and I did it."

The national Olympic swimming trials began with disappointment for Oleksiak, who finished ninth in the 200 m freestyle final and missed qualification for the event. She went on to win the 100 m freestyle with a time of 53.66, coming 0.05 seconds short of the Olympic qualifying time to guarantee a competitive berth in the individual event. Oleksiak was nevertheless named to the relay team, and said she was "just excited to be part of the team right now. It definitely takes some weight off my shoulders knowing that I'm going." She concluded the trials with a win in the 50 m freestyle event, albeit again below the Olympic qualifying time. She explained her participation as "just kind of practice for the front end of my 100." Oleksiak indicated that she would seek to obtain the Olympic standard in the 100 m prior to the June 23 deadline. She would subsequently compete at the Sette Colli International in Rome, but came short of the Olympic standard again with a 53.77.

At the 2024 Summer Olympics, Oleksiak began by participating in both the heats and the final of the 4×100 m freestyle relay, where the Canadian team finished fourth. She swam the freestyle leg in the heats of the 4×100 m medley relay, helping Canada qualify to the final in second position. Summer McIntosh replaced her in the final, where the Canadian team came fourth.

It was announced that Oleksiak would compete at the 2024 World Aquatics Swimming Championships, her first appearance at the event since 2016. At the competition, she anchored the 4 x 100-metre freestyle team to a bronze medal.

=== 2025 season ===
In November 2025, Oleksiak was issued a two-year ban backdated to the start of voluntary provisional suspension in July 2025 for an anti-doping rule violation for whereabouts failures. She will be eligible for competition again on July 14, 2027.

== Personal life ==
Oleksiak was born to immigrant parents, a Polish American father and a Scottish mother, and is the youngest of five siblings, one of whom is NHL defenceman Jamie Oleksiak, who plays for the Vancouver Canucks. The rest of the family also has an athletic tradition: her father, Richard, is from Buffalo, New York and played basketball, football and field athletics and her mother held multiple Scottish Age Group swimming records in freestyle and backstroke. Older sister Hayley was a rower at Northeastern University, and older brother Jake played college hockey. She attended Monarch Park Collegiate Institute in Toronto, Ontario until leaving at the end of the 2016–17 school year.

== Personal bests ==
=== Long course (50-metre pool) ===
Event	Time	Venue	Date	Notes
50 m freestyle	25.38	26th International Meeting, Uster	February 4, 2018	
100 m freestyle	52.59	Tokyo Aquatics Centre, Tokyo	July 30, 2021	NR
200 m freestyle	1:54.70	Tokyo Aquatics Centre, Tokyo	July 27, 2021	
50 m butterfly	25.62	Danube Arena, Budapest	July 29, 2017	NR
100 m butterfly	56.46	Olympic Aquatics Stadium, Rio de Janeiro	August 7, 2016	former NR
200 m butterfly	2:09.96	University of British Columbia, Vancouver	June 3, 2018	

=== Short course (25-metre pool) ===
Event	Time	Venue	Date	Notes
100 m freestyle	52.01	WFCU Centre, Windsor	December 8, 2016	NR, WJR

== See also ==
- List of Olympic medalists in swimming (women)
