= Swimming at the 2022 World Aquatics Championships – Women's 4 × 100 metre freestyle relay =

Women's 4 × 100 metre freestyle relay at the 2022 World Aquatics Championships
- Venue: Danube Arena
- Location: Budapest, Hungary
- Dates: 18 June (heats and final)
- Competitors: 53 from 11 nations
- Teams: 11
- Winning time: 3:30.95

Medalists
gold medal	Mollie O'Callaghan; Madison Wilson; Meg Harris; Shayna Jack; Leah Neale; Brianna Throssell	Australia
silver medal	Kayla Sanchez; Taylor Ruck; Maggie Mac Neil; Penny Oleksiak; Rebecca Smith; Katerine Savard	Canada
bronze medal	Torri Huske; Erika Brown; Kate Douglass; Claire Curzan; Mallory Comerford; Natalie Hinds	United States

The Women's 4 × 100 metre freestyle relay competition at the 2022 World Aquatics Championships was held on 18 June 2022.

== Records ==
Prior to the competition, the existing world and championship records were as follows.

World record	Australia	3:29.69	Tokyo, Japan	25 July 2021
Competition record	Australia	3:30.21	Gwangju, South Korea	21 July 2019

== Results ==
=== Heats ===
The heats were started at 11:18.

Rank	Heat	Lane	Nation	Swimmers	Time	Notes
1	2	4	Australia	Madison Wilson (52.99); Meg Harris (52.98); Leah Neale (53.85); Brianna Throssell (53.92)	3:33.74	Q
2	2	5	United States	Kate Douglass (54.19); Mallory Comerford (53.86); Erika Brown (53.29); Natalie Hinds (53.89)	3:35.23	Q
3	1	4	Canada	Kayla Sanchez (53.51); Taylor Ruck (53.49); Rebecca Smith (54.29); Katerine Savard (54.05)	3:35.34	Q
4	2	3	Great Britain	Lucy Hope (55.12); Anna Hopkin (53.03); Medi Harris (54.92); Freya Anderson (53.17)	3:36.24	Q
5	1	3	China	Zhu Menghui (54.65); Ai Yanhan (54.31); Lao Lihui (54.26); Cheng Yujie (53.44)	3:36.66	Q
6	1	5	Netherlands	Kim Busch (55.45); Marrit Steenbergen (52.99); Tessa Giele (54.43); Valerie van Roon (54.69)	3:37.56	Q
7	2	6	Brazil	Ana Carolina Vieira (54.65); Stephanie Balduccini (54.09); Giovanna Diamante (53.98); Giovana Medeiros (55.32)	3:38.04	Q
8	1	6	Hungary	Nikolett Pádár (55.01); Petra Senánszky (55.26); Dóra Molnár (54.91); Fanni Gyurinovics (53.86)	3:39.04	Q
9	2	7	South Korea	Jeong So-eun (55.26); Hur Yeon-kyung (55.87); Jung Hyun-young (55.89); Ko Mi-so (55.92)	3:42.94	
10	2	2	Israel	Anastasia Gorbenko (54.35); Daria Golovaty (55.59); Aviv Barzelay (57.46); Lea Polonsky (56.19)	3:43.59	
11	1	2	Thailand	Jenjira Srisaard (58.96); Kamonchanok Kwanmuang (1:01.10); Phiangkhwan Pawapotako (1:01.56); Jinjutha Pholjamjumrus (58.60)	4:00.22	

=== Final ===
The final was held at 19:47.

Rank	Lane	Nation	Swimmers	Time	Notes
1st place, gold medalist(s)	4	Australia	Mollie O'Callaghan (52.70); Madison Wilson (52.60); Meg Harris (53.00); Shayna Jack (52.65)	3:30.95	
2nd place, silver medalist(s)	3	Canada	Kayla Sanchez (53.45); Taylor Ruck (52.92); Maggie Mac Neil (53.27); Penny Oleksiak (52.51)	3:32.15	
3rd place, bronze medalist(s)	5	United States	Torri Huske (52.96); Erika Brown (53.30); Kate Douglass (53.61); Claire Curzan (52.71)	3:32.58	
4	2	China	Zhang Yufei (54.81); Zhu Menghui (54.47); Yang Junxuan (52.79); Cheng Yujie (53.18)	3:35.25	
5	6	Great Britain	Anna Hopkin (53.70); Abbie Wood (55.03); Lucy Hope (54.00); Freya Anderson (52.70)	3:35.43	
6	1	Brazil	Ana Carolina Vieira (54.78); Stephanie Balduccini (53.97); Giovanna Diamante (54.09); Giovana Medeiros (55.26)	3:38.10	
7	7	Netherlands	Marrit Steenbergen (53.41); Tessa Giele (54.49); Kim Busch (55.47); Valerie van Roon (54.81)	3:38.18	
8	8	Hungary	Nikolett Pádár (55.16); Fanni Gyurinovics (54.15); Petra Senánszky (54.88); Dóra Molnár (54.01)	3:38.20	
