= 2010 Pan Pacific Swimming Championships – Women's 50 metre butterfly =

Women's 50 metre butterfly at the 2010 Pan Pacific Swimming Championships
- Venue: William Woollett Jr. Aquatics Center
- Dates: August 18, 2010 (heats & finals)
- Competitors: 21 from 8 nations
- Winning time: 25.99

Medalists
| gold medal | Marieke Guehrer | Australia |
| silver medal | Emily Seebohm | Australia |
| bronze medal | Christine Magnuson | United States |

The women's 50 metre butterfly competition at the 2010 Pan Pacific Swimming Championships took place on August 18 at the William Woollett Jr. Aquatics Center. It was the first appearance of this event in the Pan Pacific Swimming Championships.

== Records ==
Prior to this competition, the existing world record was as follows:

| World record | Therese Alshammar (SWE) | 25.07 | Rome, Italy | July 31, 2009 |

== Results ==
All times are in minutes and seconds.

| KEY: | q | Fastest non-qualifiers | Q | Qualified | CR | Championships record | NR | National record | PB | Personal best | SB | Seasonal best |

=== Heats ===
The first round was held on August 18, at 10:00.

| Rank | Heat | Lane | Name | Nationality | Time | Notes |
|---|---|---|---|---|---|---|
| 1 | 3 | 4 | Marieke Guehrer | Australia | 26.19 | QA |
| 2 | 1 | 5 | Emily Seebohm | Australia | 26.36 | QA |
| 3 | 2 | 5 | Yuka Kato | Japan | 26.40 | QA |
| 4 | 3 | 5 | Gabriella Silva | Brazil | 26.42 | QA |
| 5 | 2 | 3 | Jessica Hardy | United States | 26.52 | QA |
| 6 | 2 | 4 | Yolane Kukla | Australia | 26.56 | QA |
| 7 | 1 | 4 | Christine Magnuson | United States | 26.65 | QA |
| 8 | 2 | 6 | Stephanie Rice | Australia | 26.78 | QA |
| 9 | 3 | 6 | Hannah Wilson | Hong Kong | 26.86 | QB |
| 10 | 1 | 3 | Kara Lynn Joyce | United States | 27.01 | QB |
| 11 | 2 | 2 | Katerine Savard | Canada | 27.05 | QB |
| 12 | 1 | 6 | Jessicah Schipper | Australia | 27.22 | QB |
| 13 | 1 | 1 | Tessa Wallace | Australia | 27.25 | QB |
| 14 | 3 | 2 | Tomoyo Fukuda | Japan | 27.33 | QB |
| 15 | 3 | 7 | Hayley Palmer | New Zealand | 27.54 | QB |
| 16 | 3 | 3 | Ariana Kukors | United States | 27.63 | QB |
| 17 | 1 | 2 | Park Na-Ri | South Korea | 27.76 | |
| 17 | 2 | 7 | Ashley McGregor | Canada | 27.76 | |
| 19 | 1 | 7 | Hiroko Sugino | Japan | 27.81 | |
| 20 | 3 | 1 | Tianna Rissling | Canada | 28.60 | |
| 21 | 2 | 1 | Samantha Marshall | Australia | 29.31 | |

=== B Final ===
The B final was held on August 18, at 18:00.

| Rank | Lane | Name | Nationality | Time | Notes |
|---|---|---|---|---|---|
| 9 | 4 | Yolane Kukla | Australia | 25.99 | |
| 10 | 5 | Tomoyo Fukuda | Japan | 27.12 | |
| 11 | 3 | Hayley Palmer | New Zealand | 27.38 | |
| 12 | 6 | Ariana Kukors | United States | 27.52 | |
| 13 | 7 | Park Na-Ri | South Korea | 27.56 | |
| 14 | 2 | Ashley McGregor | Canada | 27.88 | |
| 15 | 1 | Hiroko Sugino | Japan | 28.31 | |
| 16 | 8 | Tianna Rissling | Canada | 28.46 | |

=== A Final ===
The A final was held on August 18, at 18:00.

| Rank | Lane | Name | Nationality | Time | Notes |
|---|---|---|---|---|---|
| 1st place, gold medalist(s) | 4 | Marieke Guehrer | Australia | 25.99 | |
| 2nd place, silver medalist(s) | 5 | Emily Seebohm | Australia | 26.08 | |
| 3rd place, bronze medalist(s) | 7 | Christine Magnuson | United States | 26.33 | |
| 4 | 3 | Yuka Kato | Japan | 26.38 | |
| 5 | 6 | Gabriella Silva | Brazil | 26.52 | |
| 6 | 2 | Jessica Hardy | United States | 26.61 | |
| 7 | 1 | Hannah Wilson | Hong Kong | 27.01 | |
| 8 | 8 | Katerine Savard | Canada | 27.16 | |
