= Swimming at the 2016 Summer Olympics – Women's 4 × 200 metre freestyle relay =

Women's 4 × 200 metre freestyle relay at the Games of the XXXI Olympiad
- Venue: Olympic Aquatics Stadium
- Dates: 10 August 2016 (heats & final)
- Competitors: 76 from 16 nations
- Teams: 16
- Winning time: 7:43.03

Medalists
| 1st place, gold medalist(s) | | Allison Schmitt, Leah Smith, Maya DiRado, Katie Ledecky, Missy Franklin*, Melanie Margalis*, Cierra Runge* | United States |
| 2nd place, silver medalist(s) | | Leah Neale, Emma McKeon, Bronte Barratt, Tamsin Cook, Jessica Ashwood* | Australia |
| 3rd place, bronze medalist(s) | | Katerine Savard, Taylor Ruck, Brittany MacLean, Penny Oleksiak, Emily Overholt*, Kennedy Goss*; *Indicates the swimmer only competed in the preliminary heats. | Canada |

The women's 4 × 200 metre freestyle relay event at the 2016 Summer Olympics took place on 10 August at the Olympic Aquatics Stadium.

== Summary ==
The U.S. women's team overhauled the rest of the field on the home stretch to defend their Olympic title with the help of a sterling anchor leg from Katie Ledecky. Trading the lead with Sweden, China, and Australia through the first three legs of the race, Ledecky left the field behind with an anchor split of 1:53.74 to deliver the American foursome of Allison Schmitt (1:56.21), Leah Smith (1:56.69), and Maya DiRado (1:56.39) a gold medal in 7:43.03. As the Americans celebrated their victory, Ledecky also added the relay gold to her individual triumphs in both the 200 and 400 m freestyle earlier.

Australia's Leah Neale (1:57.95), Emma McKeon (1:54.64), and Bronte Barratt (1:55.81) moved themselves to the front on the third leg. As the youngster Tamsin Cook dove into the pool at the final exchange with a 1:56.47 split, she could not catch Ledecky near the wall to reproduce her nation's silver-medal feat from London 2012 in 7:44.87. Meanwhile, Canada's Katerine Savard (1:57.91), Taylor Ruck (1:56.18), Brittany MacLean (1:56.36), and Penny Oleksiak (1:54.94) were unable to close the gap on the two leading teams at the anchor leg, leaving them with a bronze and a national record in 7:45.39.

Seizing a brief lead early in the race, the Chinese combination of Shen Duo (1:56.30), Ai Yanhan (1:57.79), Dong Jie (1:57.15), and Zhang Yuhan (1:56.72) slipped out of medals to fourth in 7:47.96. Sweden's Michelle Coleman (1:56.20), Ida Marko-Varga (1:59.46), Sarah Sjöström (1:54.88), and Louise Hansson (1:59.72) finished the race with a fifth-place time in 7:50.26, while Hungary (7:51.03), anchored by three-time gold medalist Katinka Hosszú, Russia (7:53.26), and Japan (7:56.76) rounded out the championship field.

== Records ==
Prior to this competition, the existing world and Olympic records were as follows.

| World record | China (CHN); Yang Yu (1:55.47); Zhu Qianwei (1:55.79); Liu Jing (1:56.09); Pang Jiaying (1:54.73) | 7:42.08 | Rome, Italy | 30 July 2009 |
| Olympic record | United States; Missy Franklin (1:55.96); Dana Vollmer (1:56.02); Shannon Vreeland (1:56.85); Allison Schmitt (1:54.09) | 7:42.92 | London, Great Britain | 1 August 2012 |

== Competition format ==
The competition consisted of two rounds: heats and a final. The relay teams with the best 8 times in the heats advanced to the final. Swim-offs were used as necessary to break ties for advancement to the next round.

== Results ==
=== Heats ===
A total of sixteen countries qualified to participate. The best eight from two heats advanced to the final.

| Rank | Heat | Lane | Nation | Swimmers | Time | Notes |
|---|---|---|---|---|---|---|
| 1 | 2 | 4 | United States | Allison Schmitt (1:55.95); Missy Franklin (1:57.03); Melanie Margalis (1:57.04); Cierra Runge (1:57.75) | 7:47.77 | Q |
| 2 | 1 | 3 | Australia | Leah Neale (1:57.06); Bronte Barratt (1:56.85); Tamsin Cook (1:57.35); Jessica Ashwood (1:57.98) | 7:49.24 | Q |
| 3 | 2 | 5 | China | Ai Yanhan (1:57.20); Zhang Yuhan (1:56.38); Dong Jie (1:57.45); Wang Shijia (1:58.55) | 7:49.58 | Q |
| 4 | 1 | 2 | Russia | Viktoriya Andreeva (1:57.82); Arina Openysheva (1:57.67); Daria Mullakaeva (1:57.85); Veronika Popova (1:57.18) | 7:50.52 | Q, NR |
| 5 | 2 | 8 | Hungary | Evelyn Verrasztó (1:58.81); Ajna Késely (1:58.93); Boglárka Kapás (1:57.77); Katinka Hosszú (1:55.66) | 7:51.17 | Q |
| 6 | 1 | 7 | Canada | Katerine Savard (1:57.96); Taylor Ruck (1:56.25); Emily Overholt (1:58.29); Kennedy Goss (1:59.49) | 7:51.99 | Q |
| 7 | 1 | 6 | Japan | Chihiro Igarashi (1:57.18) NR; Rikako Ikee (1:57.71); Tomomi Aoki (1:57.39); Sachi Mochida (2:00.22) | 7:52.50 | Q |
| 8 | 1 | 5 | Sweden | Louise Hansson (2:00.07); Michelle Coleman (1:56.93); Ida Marko-Varga (1:59.27); Sarah Sjöström (1:57.16) | 7:53.43 | Q |
| 9 | 2 | 3 | Great Britain | Siobhan-Marie O'Connor (1:57.47); Georgia Coates (1:58.59); Hannah Miley (1:58.66); Camilla Hattersley (1:59.45) | 7:54.17 | |
| 10 | 2 | 2 | France | Coralie Balmy (1:57.38); Cloé Hache (2:01.52); Charlotte Bonnet (1:58.15); Margaux Fabre (1:58.50) | 7:55.55 | |
| 11 | 2 | 7 | Brazil | Manuella Lyrio (1:58.39); Jéssica Cavalheiro (1:59.05); Gabrielle Roncatto (2:00.09); Larissa Oliveira (1:58.15) | 7:55.68 | SA |
| 12 | 2 | 1 | Germany | Annika Bruhn (1:59.28); Leonie Kullmann (1:59.04); Paulina Schmiedel (2:01.24); Sarah Köhler (1:57.18) | 7:56.74 | |
| 13 | 1 | 4 | Italy | Alice Mizzau (1:59.74); Martina de Memme (2:00.54); Chiara Masini Lucetti (2:00.98); Federica Pellegrini (1:56.48) | 7:57.74 | |
| 14 | 1 | 1 | Netherlands | Marrit Steenbergen (2:00.80); Esmee Vermeulen (1:59.07); Andrea Kneppers (1:59.86); Robin Neumann (1:59.01) | 7:58.74 | |
| 15 | 1 | 8 | Slovenia | Janja Šegel (1:59.81); Anja Klinar (2:00.74); Tjaša Pintar (1:59.25); Tjaša Oder (2:02.42) | 8:02.22 | |
| 16 | 2 | 6 | Spain | Melania Costa Schmid (2:00.02); Patricia Castro (1:59.91); Fátima Gallardo (2:00.02); África Zamorano (2:03.79) | 8:03.74 | |

=== Final ===
| Rank | Lane | Nation | Swimmers | Time | Notes |
|---|---|---|---|---|---|
| 1st place, gold medalist(s) | 4 | United States | Allison Schmitt (1:56.21); Leah Smith (1:56.69); Maya DiRado (1:56.39); Katie Ledecky (1:53.74) | 7:43.03 | |
| 2nd place, silver medalist(s) | 5 | Australia | Leah Neale (1:57.95); Emma McKeon (1:54.64); Bronte Barratt (1:55.81); Tamsin Cook (1:56.47) | 7:44.87 | |
| 3rd place, bronze medalist(s) | 7 | Canada | Katerine Savard (1:57.91); Taylor Ruck (1:56.18); Brittany MacLean (1:56.36); Penny Oleksiak (1:54.94) | 7:45.39 | NR |
| 4 | 3 | China | Shen Duo (1:56.30); Ai Yanhan (1:57.79); Dong Jie (1:57.15); Zhang Yuhan (1:56.72) | 7:47.96 | |
| 5 | 8 | Sweden | Michelle Coleman (1:56.20); Ida Marko-Varga (1:59.46); Sarah Sjöström (1:54.88); Louise Hansson (1:59.72) | 7:50.26 | |
| 6 | 2 | Hungary | Zsuzsanna Jakabos (1:58.90); Ajna Késely (1:58.74); Boglárka Kapás (1:57.65); Katinka Hosszú (1:55.74) | 7:51.03 | |
| 7 | 6 | Russia | Veronika Popova (1:57.52); Viktoriya Andreeva (1:58.10); Daria Ustinova (1:59.54); Arina Openysheva (1:58.10) | 7:53.26 | |
| 8 | 1 | Japan | Chihiro Igarashi (1:57.85); Sachi Mochida (2:02.00); Tomomi Aoki (1:58.66); Rikako Ikee (1:58.25) | 7:56.76 | |
