= Dong Jie (swimmer) =

Chinese swimmer (born 1998)

Personal information
- Nationality: Chinese
- Born: 31 October 1998 (age 27) Huai'an, China

Sport
- Sport: Swimming
- Strokes: Freestyle
Medal record
Women's swimming
Representing China
Olympic Games
Gold medal – first place	2020 Tokyo	4×200 m freestyle

Dong Jie (Chinese: 董洁, born 31 October 1998) is a Chinese swimmer. She competed in the women's 4 × 200 metre freestyle relay event at the 2016 Summer Olympics. She won the gold medal in the women's 4 × 200 metre freestyle relay at the 2020 Summer Olympics as a swimmer in the preliminary series.
