= Kennedy Goss =

Canadian swimmer (born 1996)

Personal information
- National team: Canada
- Born: August 19, 1996 (age 29) Toronto, Ontario, Canada

Sport
- Sport: Swimming
- Club: Granite Gators Swim Club
- College team: Indiana Hoosiers
Medal record
Women's swimming
Representing Canada
Olympic Games
Bronze medal – third place	2016 Rio de Janeiro	4×200 m freestyle
World Championships (SC)
Gold medal – first place	2016 Windsor	4×200 m freestyle
Representing the Indiana Hoosiers
NCAA Championships
Silver medal – second place	2018 Columbus	4×100 y medley
Bronze medal – third place	2016 Atlanta	200 y backstroke
Bronze medal – third place	2017 Indianapolis	500 y freestyle

Kennedy Goss (born August 19, 1996) is a Canadian competitive swimmer. Goss won 7 medals at the 2013 Canada Games, including 5 gold.

In 2016, she was named to Canada's Olympic team for the 2016 Summer Olympics as part of the 4x200 metre freestyle relay team.

== Personal life ==
Her father Sandy Goss is a former competitive swimmer for Canada, and competed at the 1984 Summer Olympics and 1988 Summer Olympics, winning two silver medals.

Kennedy competes for The Indiana University Hoosiers.
