= Leilani Fack =

Canadian swimmer

Personal information
- Full name: Leilani Ruvarashe Maya Fack
- Nationality: Canadian
- Born: August 29, 2006 (age 20) Surrey, British Columbia, Canada
- Education: University of Michigan

Sport
- Sport: Swimming
- Strokes: Freestyle, Butterfly
- Club: Langley Olympians Swim Club

Leilani (Leila) Fack (Leilani Ruvarashe Maya Fack), born 29 August 2006, is a Canadian swimmer who participated at the 2026 Pan Pacific Swimming Championships, winning a relay bronze medal, and reaching the final of the 50 m butterfly. Hailing from Surrey, British Columbia, she competes in the NCAA for the University of Michigan Wolverines, where she is enrolled in the College of Literature, Science, and the Arts.
