= Katerine Savard =

Canadian swimmer (born 1993)

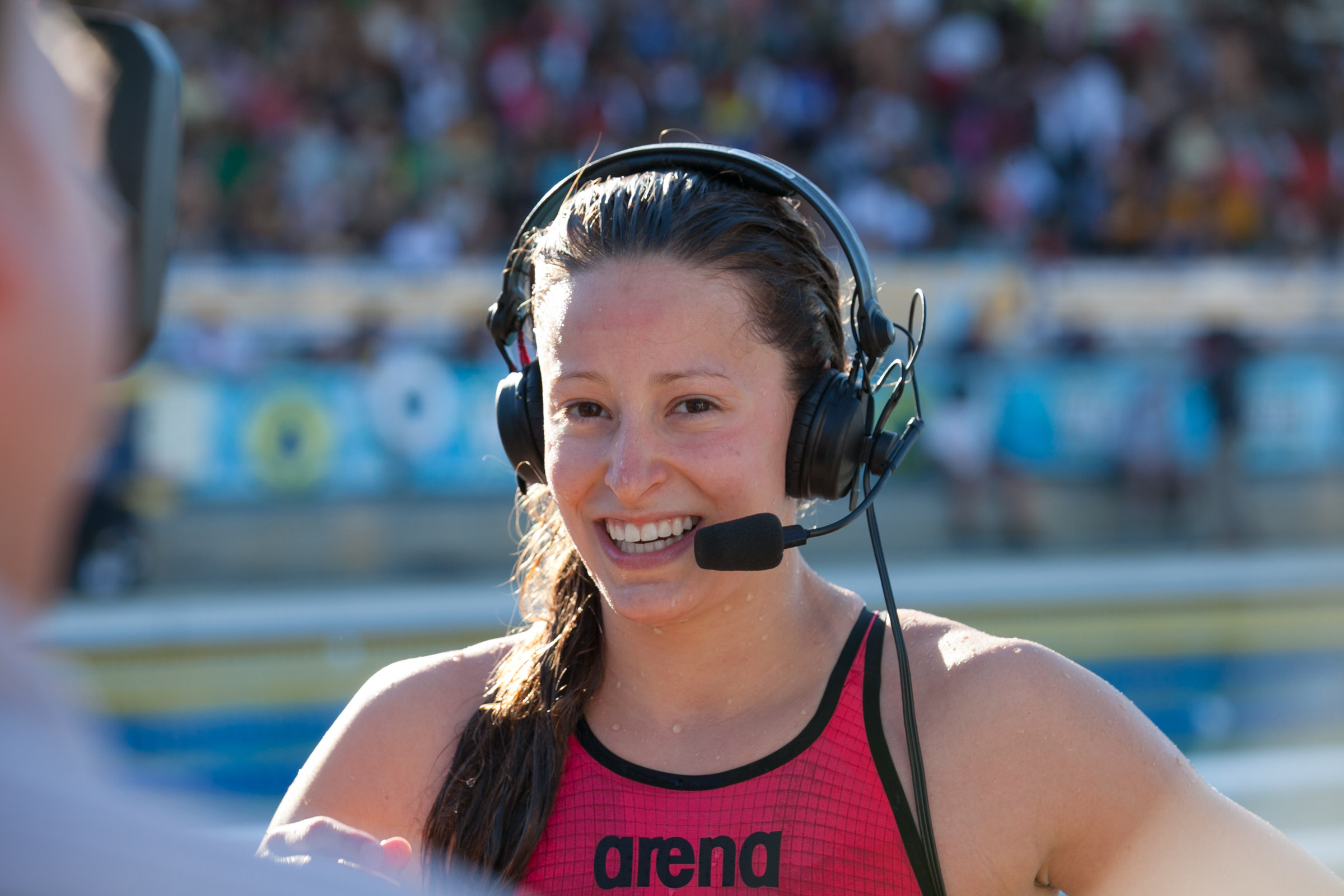
- Savard in 2013

Personal information
- Born: May 26, 1993 (age 33) Quebec City, Quebec, Canada
- Home town: Pont-Rouge, Quebec, Canada
- Height: 1.67 m (5 ft 6 in)
- Weight: 54 kg (119 lb)

Sport
- Country: Canada
- Sport: Swimming
- Strokes: Butterfly, freestyle
- Club: Club Aquatique Montreal CAMO
- Coach: Greg Arkhurst
Medal record
Women's swimming
Representing Canada
Event	1st	2nd	3rd
Olympic Games	0	0	1
World Championships (LC)	0	1	3
World Championships (SC)	4	3	2
Total	4	4	6
Olympic Games
Bronze medal – third place	2016 Rio de Janeiro	4×200 m freestyle
World Championships (LC)
Silver medal – second place	2022 Budapest	4×100 m freestyle
Bronze medal – third place	2022 Budapest	4×200 m freestyle
Bronze medal – third place	2024 Doha	4×100 m freestyle
Bronze medal – third place	2024 Doha	4×100 m medley
World Championships (SC)
Gold medal – first place	2016 Windsor	4×200 m freestyle
Gold medal – first place	2021 Abu Dhabi	4×100 m freestyle
Gold medal – first place	2021 Abu Dhabi	4×50 m mixed freestyle
Gold medal – first place	2021 Abu Dhabi	4×200 m freestyle
Silver medal – second place	2016 Windsor	4×100 m medley
Silver medal – second place	2021 Abu Dhabi	4×100 m medley
Silver medal – second place	2022 Melbourne	4×200 m freestyle
Bronze medal – third place	2022 Melbourne	4×100 m freestyle
Bronze medal – third place	2022 Melbourne	4×100 m medley
Pan Pacific Championships
Bronze medal – third place	2014 Gold Coast	4×100 m medley
Commonwealth Games
Gold medal – first place	2014 Glasgow	100 m butterfly
Silver medal – second place	2022 Birmingham	4×200 m freestyle
Bronze medal – third place	2014 Glasgow	4×100 m medley
Bronze medal – third place	2022 Birmingham	4×100 m freestyle
Pan American Games
Gold medal – first place	2015 Toronto	4×100 m freestyle
Gold medal – first place	2023 Santiago	4×100 m freestyle
Silver medal – second place	2019 Lima	4×200 m freestyle
Silver medal – second place	2019 Lima	4×100 m medley
Bronze medal – third place	2015 Toronto	100 m butterfly
Bronze medal – third place	2015 Toronto	4×200 m freestyle
Bronze medal – third place	2019 Lima	4×100 m freestyle
Summer Universiade
Gold medal – first place	2013 Kazan	100 m butterfly
Gold medal – first place	2017 Taipei	4×100 m freestyle relay
Silver medal – second place	2013 Kazan	50 m butterfly

Katerine Savard (born May 26, 1993) is a Canadian former competitive swimmer who specializes in women's butterfly events and freestyle relay. She holds several Canadian national records in the butterfly over the 50-, 100-, and 200-metre distances in both the short and long courses. Savard also holds the Canadian junior butterfly record in the 200-metre event. She won the gold medal at the 100-metre butterfly event at the 2013 Summer Universiade, held in Kazan. Savard also won gold at the 2014 Commonwealth Games in the 100-metre butterfly in Glasgow, where she set the Commonwealth record in the process. At the same games, she won a bronze medal as a member of the women's 4×100-metre medley relay team.

== Personal life ==
With her mother afraid of drowning, Savard began to swim early and dove into the water at the age of 8 months. At this time, she did not like water. She continued to meet her Aquaventure 4 certification, where she stands out for her excellent technique in several strokes and was invited to join the sports team Swim Club UNIK from Pont-Rouge. In 2004, at 10 years old, after a few medals in regional competitions, she received the title of succession of the year of this club.

She takes more taste for competitions and decided in 2006, at age 13, to join the swim club CSQ at Quebec City which offers the Sport-Study swimming in high school the Camaradière.

Within months, intensive training led her to achieve the standard Youth and to make her first provincial team, the "Triangulaire" in 2007. She made her first provincial record in 2008. She joined her first and only Canadian junior team in 2009 and made her first Canadian record in 2011. In 2010, her performances escalated on senior teams, despite her 16 years old age, becoming a national champion in the 100-metre butterfly. In 2016, she is part of the national team and has participated in many major games including London Olympics 2012 for which she was selected at just 18 years of age.

Since 2013, she stands out on the international scene and has established a world record of the Summer Universiade in 100-metre butterfly. For 2016, she achieved a bronze at the Rio Olympic Games.

== Career ==
At the 2015 FINA World Aquatics Championships in Kazan, Russia, she finished 5th in the 100-metre butterfly. She ended the year with the seventh world ranking position in this race. She also finished fifth in the 4×100-metre freestyle relay.

At the 2015 Pan American Games in Toronto, she won three medals. Gold and Canadian record in the 4×100-metre freestyle relay and two bronze medals in 100-metre butterfly and 200-metre freestyle relay.

In 2014 at 12th Pan Pacific Championships in Gold Coast, Australia, she won bronze medal in the 4×100-metre medley relay.

At the 2014 Commonwealth Games in Glasgow, Scotland, she won a gold medal and set a new Commonwealth record in the 100-metre butterfly and bronze medal in the 4×100-metre medley relay.

At the 2013 FINA Swimming World Cup series, she brought three silver medals in butterfly events. At Eindhoven, Netherlands, she took second place in 100-metre butterfly, and at Berlin, Germany, she had two second-place finishes in the 50-metre and 100-metre butterfly.

At the 2013 FINA World Aquatics Championships in Barcelona in Spain, she finished 5th with a Canadian record in the 100-metre butterfly. She ended the year with the fifth world ranking position in this race.

At the 2013 World Summer Universiade in Kazan, Russia, Savard broke the Universiade record in the 100-metre butterfly, while also acquiring a medal in the 50-metre butterfly at the games.

At the 2012 Summer Olympics in London, she finished 17th overall by only two hundredths of a second in the heats in the women's 100-metre butterfly. However, she still advanced to the semifinals, since Inge Dekker withdrew. She later failed to advance to the final finishing 8th in her heat and a 16th final placement.

She also participated in the 2012 Mare Nostrum where she won six medals. At Barcelona, Spain, she won gold in the 100-metre and 200-metre butterfly and silver in the 50-metre butterfly. At Canet in France, she won silver in the 100-metre butterfly and at Monte Carlo in Monaco she won gold in the 100-metre and bronze in the 200-metre butterfly. She completed the circuit as the third best swimmer. At the 2014 FINA World Swimming Championships, she finished in 10th place at the 100-metre butterfly and 13th place at the 200-metre butterfly.

In 2016, she was officially named to Canada's Olympic team for the 2016 Summer Olympics.

In April 2017, Savard was named to Canada's 2017 World Aquatics Championships team in Budapest, Hungary.

In September 2017, Savard was named to Canada's 2018 Commonwealth Games team.

At the 2022 World Aquatics Championships, Savard swam in the heats of the 4x100 m freestyle relay. She was replaced by Penny Oleksiak in the event final, but shared in the team's first-ever silver medal win at the World Championships in a relay. Savard competed in the heats of the 4×200 m freestyle relay for the Canadian team, helping to the event final, where she was replaced by Kayla Sanchez. She shared in the team's bronze medal win. A month later she was part of the Canadian team for the 2022 Commonwealth Games in Birmingham. On the second day of competition, she finished fifth in the 100 m butterfly and won a bronze medal in the 4×100 m freestyle relay. Teammates Maggie Mac Neil and Rebecca Smith did the same double, which Savard called "a hard double for the three of us. We did our best and it turned out pretty well." On the third day of competition she won a silver medal with the 4×200 m freestyle relay team, and qualified in eighth position to the final of the 50 m butterfly.

While many of Canada's top swimmers opted to skip the 2024 World Aquatics Championships in Doha, Savard was named to the team, cited in the media as a key veteran presence. She swam the freestyle leg in the heats of the 4×100 m medley relay. She was replaced in the final by Taylor Ruck, and shared in the team's bronze medal win.

=== Long course ===
Event	Time	Venue	Date	Notes
50 m butterfly	26.05	Kazan, Russia	July 1, 2013	List of Canadian records in swimming
100 m butterfly	57.27	Victoria, British Columbia, Canada	April 4, 2014	List of Canadian records in swimming
200 m butterfly	2:07.61	Victoria, British Columbia, Canada	April 5, 2014	
50 m freestyle	26.36	Montreal, Quebec, Canada	April 22, 2012	
100 m freestyle	55.14	Montreal, Quebec, Canada	June 26, 2015	
200 m freestyle	1.58.70	Toronto, Ontario, Canada	July 15, 2015	

=== Short course ===
Event	Time	Venue	Date	Notes
50 m butterfly	25.90	Eindhoven, Nederland	August 8, 2013	
100 m butterfly	56.35	Berlin, Germany	August 10, 2013	List of Canadian records in swimming
200 m butterfly	2.05.25	Tualatin Hills, USA	December 9, 2011	
50 m freestyle	25.15	Eindhoven, Nederland	August 7, 2013	
100 m freestyle	54.36	St-Hyacinthe, Canada	March 1, 2013	
200 m freestyle	1.55.87	Doha, Qatar	December 2, 2014	

== Acting career ==
She played the main role as a swimmer in Pascal Plante's film Nadia, Butterfly.

== See also ==
- List of Olympic medalists in swimming (women)
- List of Commonwealth Games medallists in swimming (women)
