= Michelle Toro =

Canadian swimmer (born 1991)

Personal information
- National team: Canada
- Born: Michelle Williams; January 2, 1991 (age 35) Pretoria, South Africa
- Height: 175 cm (5 ft 9 in)
- Weight: 67 kg (148 lb)
- Spouse: Guillermo Toro (m. 2016)

Sport
- Sport: Swimming
- Strokes: Freestyle
- Club: High Performance Centre - Ontario
Medal record
Women's swimming
Representing Canada
Olympic Games
Bronze medal – third place	2016 Rio de Janeiro	4×100 m freestyle
Pan American Games
Gold medal – first place	2015 Toronto	4×100 m freestyle
World Championships (SC)
Gold medal – first place	2016 Windsor	4x50 m freestyle
Bronze medal – third place	2016 Windsor	4x50 m mixed free
Commonwealth Games
Bronze medal – third place	2014 Glasgow	4×100 m freestyle
Bronze medal – third place	2014 Glasgow	4×100 m medley

Michelle Toro (née Williams; born January 2, 1991) is a Canadian competition swimmer who specializes in the freestyle in the sprint distances. She won a gold medal in the 2015 Pan American Games in Toronto in the 4 x 100 m freestyle and in the 4 x 100 m medley relay. She also won a bronze at the 2014 Commonwealth Games in the 4 x 100 m freestyle.

She competed as part of Canada's Olympic team for the 2016 Summer Olympics, commonly known as Rio 2016. Williams would help fellow Canadians Taylor Ruck, Chantal van Landeghem and Sandrine Mainville in the women's 4 x 100 m freestyle relay heats, with the team swimming the third fastest time. She then had to make way for teenage star Penelope Oleksiak in the final, where Oleksiak helped anchor the team to the bronze medal. In an interview after the event, Williams said "we've come a long way, this group of us. It's our medal and it's our medal for Canada, it's just so amazing."

== Personal ==
Williams was born in Pretoria, South Africa and speaks fluent Afrikaans alongside English, she often goes back to South Africa to visit her family in Jeffreys Bay. On December 17, 2016, shortly after the Short Course World Swimming Championships, she married her childhood teammate Guillermo (Billy) Toro. They met when she was 12 and he was 14 at the North York Aquatic Club and started dating six years later.

On December 7, 2020, the couple welcomed their first child, Jacob Murray Toro.

Toro's third child, named Samuel, was born in April 2024.

== See also ==
- List of Olympic medalists in swimming (women)
- List of Commonwealth Games medallists in swimming (women)
