= List of Canadian records in swimming =

This is a list of national swimming records for Canada. They are the fastest time ever recorded in each event by a swimmer representing Canada and are ratified by Swimming Canada.

All records were set in finals unless noted otherwise.

== Long Course (50 m) ==
=== Men ===
Event	Time		Name	Club	Date	Meet	Location	Ref
50 m freestyle	21.48		Joshua Liendo	North York Aquatic Club	18 May 2024	Canadian Trials	Toronto, Canada	
100 m freestyle	47.27		Brent Hayden	Canada	30 July 2009	World Championships	Rome, Italy	
200 m freestyle	1:46.39	b	Antoine Sauve	Club Aquatique Montreal	12 June 2025	Canadian Trials	Victoria, Canada	
400 m freestyle	3:43.46		Ryan Cochrane	Canada	24 July 2014	Commonwealth Games	Glasgow, Great Britain	
800 m freestyle	7:41.86		Ryan Cochrane	Canada	27 July 2011	World Championships	Shanghai, China	
1500 m freestyle	14:39.63		Ryan Cochrane	Canada	4 August 2012	Olympic Games	London, Great Britain	
50 m backstroke	24.90		Javier Acevedo	Ajax Aquatic Club	29 March 2023	Canadian Trials	Toronto, Canada	
100 m backstroke	52.95	rh	Blake Tierney	Canada	3 August 2025	World Championships	Singapore, Singapore	
200 m backstroke	1:55.03	sf	Blake Tierney	Canada	31 July 2025	World Championships	Singapore, Singapore	
50m breaststroke	27.28	b	Oliver Dawson	Canada	14 August 2026	Pan Pacific Championships	Irvine, United States	
100m breaststroke	59.33		Oliver Dawson	GPrairie Pir	24 May 2026	AP Race London International	London, Great Britain	
200m breaststroke	2:08.39		Oliver Dawson	Canada	28 July 2026	Commonwealth Games	Glasgow, United Kingdom	
50m butterfly	22.68	CR	Ilya Kharun	Unattached	12 June 2025	Canadian Trials	Victoria, Canada	
100m butterfly	49.99	CR	Joshua Liendo	Canada	3 August 2024	Olympic Games	Paris, France	
200m butterfly	1:52.80	CR	Ilya Kharun	Canada	31 July 2024	Olympic Games	Paris, France	
200m individual medley	1:56.07		Finlay Knox	Scarborough	18 May 2024	Canadian Trials	Toronto, Canada	
400m individual medley	4:11.32		Lorne Wigginton	Etobicoke	6 July 2026	Canadian Trials	Montreal, Canada	
4×50m freestyle relay	1:31.54		Mirando Jarry (23.03); Jonathan McGarrell (23.17); Karl Krug (22.17); Antoine Bernard-Lalonde (23.17)	Club Aquatique Montreal	20 February 2016	Speedo Eastern Canadian Open	Montreal, Canada	
4×100m freestyle relay	3:10.82		Brent Hayden (47.99); Joshua Liendo (47.51); Yuri Kisil (47.15); Markus Thormeyer (48.17)	Canada	26 July 2021	Olympic Games	Tokyo, Japan	
4×200m freestyle relay	7:05.77		Colin Russell (1:46.89); Brian Johns (1:47.61); Brent Hayden (1:44.42); Andrew Hurd (1:46.85)	Canada	13 August 2008	Olympic Games	Beijing, China	
4×50m medley relay	1:41.03		Chris Renaud; Russell Patrick; Curtis Myden; Etienne Caron	University Of Calgary Swim Club	5 August 1998	Canadian Championships	Etobicoke, Canada	
4×100m medley relay	3:29.75		Blake Tierney (53.03); Oliver Dawson (59.99); Ilya Kharun (49.83); Josh Liendo (46.90)	Canada	3 August 2025	World Championships	Singapore, Singapore	

Legend: # – Record awaiting ratification by Swimming Canada; WR – World record; AM – Americas record; CR – Commonwealth record;
Records not set in finals: h – heat; sf – semifinal; r – relay 1st leg; rh – relay heat 1st leg; b – B final; † – en route to final mark; so – swim-off; tt – time trial

=== Women ===
Event	Time		Name	Club	Date	Meet	Location	Ref
50m freestyle	24.23		Taylor Ruck	Canada	15 August 2026	Pan Pacific Championships	Irvine, United States	
100m freestyle	52.59		Penny Oleksiak	Canada	30 July 2021	Olympic Games	Tokyo, Japan	
200m freestyle	1:53.65		Summer McIntosh	Canada	26 July 2023	World Championships	Fukuoka, Japan	
400m freestyle	3:54.18	WR	Summer McIntosh	Unattached	7 June 2025	Canadian Trials	Victoria, Canada	
800m freestyle	8:05.07	CR	Summer McIntosh	Unattached	8 June 2025	Canadian Trials	Victoria, Canada	
1500m freestyle	15:57.15		Brittany MacLean	Canada	24 August 2014	Pan Pacific Championships	Gold Coast, Australia	
50m backstroke	27.13	h	Kylie Masse	Canada	1 May 2025	TYR Pro Swim Series	Fort Lauderdale, United States	
100m backstroke	57.70		Kylie Masse	Toronto Swim Club	19 June 2021	Canadian Olympic Trials	Toronto, Canada	
200m backstroke	2:05.42		Kylie Masse	Canada	31 July 2021	Olympic Games	Tokyo, Japan	
50m breaststroke	30.23		Amanda Reason	Etobicoke Swim Club	8 July 2009	Canadian World Championship Trials	Montreal, Canada	
100m breaststroke	1:05.74		Annamay Pierse	UBC Dolphins Swim Club	9 July 2009	Canadian World Championship Trials	Montreal, Canada	
200m breaststroke	2:20.12	sf	Annamay Pierse	Canada	30 July 2009	World Championships	Rome, Italy	
50m butterfly	25.23		Taylor Ruck	Canada	12 August 2026	Pan Pacific Championships	Irvine, United States	
100m butterfly	55.59	CR	Maggie Mac Neil	Canada	26 July 2021	Olympic Games	Tokyo, Japan	
200m butterfly	2:01.65	WR	Summer McIntosh	Unattached	5 July 2026	Canadian Trials	Montreal, Canada	
200m individual medley	2:05.70	WR	Summer McIntosh	Unattached	9 June 2025	Canadian Trials	Victoria, Canada	
400m individual medley	4:23.65	WR	Summer McIntosh	Unattached	11 June 2025	Canadian Trials	Victoria, Canada	
4×50m freestyle relay	1:40.46		Sandrine Mainville (25.71); Chantal Van Landeghem (24.51); Michelle Toro (24.77); Penny Oleksiak (25.47)	Canada	20 February 2016	Speedo Eastern Canadian Open	Montreal, Canada	
4×100m freestyle relay	3:31.78		Kayla Sanchez (53.72); Taylor Ruck (52.19); Penny Oleksiak (52.69); Maggie Mac Neil (53.18)	Canada	21 July 2019	World Championships	Gwangju, South Korea	
4×200m freestyle relay	7:43.77		Summer McIntosh (1:55.74); Rebecca Smith (1:57.30); Kayla Sanchez (1:55.59); Penny Oleksiak (1:55.14)	Canada	29 July 2021	Olympic Games	Tokyo, Japan	
4×50m medley relay	1:53.30		Julia Wilkinson (29.56); Annamay Pierse (31.13); Audrey Lacroix (27.71); Erica Morningstar (24.90)	Canada	20 July 2008	Canadian Summer Nationals	Winnipeg, Canada	
4×100m medley relay	3:52.60		Kylie Masse (57.90); Sydney Pickrem (1:07.17); Maggie Mac Neil (55.27); Penny Oleksiak (52.26)	Canada	1 August 2021	Olympic Games	Tokyo, Japan	

Legend: # – Record awaiting ratification by Swimming Canada; WR – World record; AM – Americas record; CR – Commonwealth record;
Records not set in finals: h – heat; sf – semifinal; r – relay 1st leg; rh – relay heat 1st leg; b – B final; † – en route to final mark; so – swim-off; tt – time trial

=== Mixed relay ===
Event	Time	Name	Club	Date	Meet	Location	Ref
4×100m freestyle relay	3:20.61	Joshua Liendo (48.02); Javier Acevedo (47.96); Kayla Sanchez (52.52); Penny Oleksiak (52.11)	Canada	24 June 2022	World Championships	Budapest, Hungary	
4×100m medley relay	3:40.90	Kylie Masse (58.69); Oliver Dawson (59.63); Joshua Liendo (49.64); Taylor Ruck (52.94)	Canada	30 July 2025	World Championships	Singapore, Singapore	

Legend: # – Record awaiting ratification by Swimming Canada; WR – World record; AM – Americas record; CR – Commonwealth record;
Records not set in finals: h – heat; so – swim-off

== Short Course (25 m) ==
=== Men ===
Event	Time		Name	Club	Date	Meet	Location	Ref
50 m freestyle	20.31		Joshua Liendo	Canada	23 October 2025	World Cup	Toronto, Canada	
100m freestyle	45.30		Joshua Liendo	Canada	24 October 2025	World Cup	Toronto, Canada	
200m freestyle	1:40.80		Brent Hayden	Canada	15 November 2009	World Cup	Berlin, Germany	
400m freestyle	3:39.10		Ryan Cochrane	Canada	6 August 2009	British Gas Grand Prix	Leeds, Great Britain	
800m freestyle	7:38.44	†	Ryan Cochrane	Canada	7 December 2014	World Championships	Doha, Qatar	
1500m freestyle	14:23.35		Ryan Cochrane	Canada	7 December 2014	World Championships	Doha, Qatar	
50m backstroke	23.03	sf	Finlay Knox	Canada	12 December 2024	World Championships	Budapest, Hungary	
100m backstroke	49.39		Blake Tierney	Canada	11 December 2024	World Championships	Budapest, Hungary	
200m backstroke	1:49.74		Javier Acevedo	Canada	3 November 2022	World Cup	Indianapolis, United States	
50m breaststroke	26.30	h	Finlay Knox	Canada	14 December 2024	World Championships	Budapest, Hungary	
100m breaststroke	57.10		Paul Kornfeld	Canada	7 August 2009	British Gas Grand Prix	Leeds, Great Britain	
200m breaststroke	2:03.26		Paul Kornfeld	Canada	9 August 2009	British Gas Grand Prix	Leeds, Great Britain	
50m butterfly	21.67	CR, AM	Ilya Kharun	Canada	11 December 2024	World Championships	Budapest, Hungary	
100m butterfly	47.68	WR	Joshua Liendo	Canada	23 October 2025	World Cup	Toronto, Canada	
200m butterfly	1:48.24	CR, AM	Ilya Kharun	Canada	12 December 2024	World Championships	Budapest, Hungary	
100m individual medley	51.05	=CR	Javier Acevedo	Canada	16 December 2022	World Championships	Melbourne, Australia	
100m individual medley	51.05	=CR	Finlay Knox	Canada	23 October 2025	World Cup	Toronto, Canada	
200m individual medley	1:50.90		Finlay Knox	Canada	10 December 2024	World Championships	Budapest, Hungary	
400m individual medley	4:00.57		Tristan Jankovics	Canada	14 December 2024	World Championships	Budapest, Hungary	
4×50m freestyle relay	1:26.94		Andrew Poznikoff (22.16); David Hibberd (21.16); Steven Hibberd (21.81); Ben Berg (21.81)	Simon Fraser Aquatics	1 August 2014	SFU Grand Prix	Burnaby, Canada	
4×100m freestyle relay	3:07.10		Ruslan Gaziev (47.08); Yuri Kisil (46.41); Javier Acevedo (46.18); Ilya Kharun (47.43)	Canada	13 December 2022	World Championships	Melbourne, Australia	
4×200m freestyle relay	6:51.05		Colin Russell (1:43.60); Stefan Hirniak (1:43.41); Brent Hayden (1:41.49); Joel Greenshields (1:42.55)	Canada	7 August 2009	British Gas Grand Prix	Leeds, United Kingdom	
4×50m medley relay	1:37.24		Markus Thormeyer (24.48); Jaren Lefranc (27.80); Josiah Binnema (23.17); Alex Loginov (21.79)	The University of British Columbia	3 November 2018	Odlum Brown Colleges Cup Pacific	Vancouver, Canada	
4×100m medley relay	3:21.17		Blake Tierney (49.87); Finlay Knox (56.71); Ilya Kharun (48.66); Yuri Kisil (45.93)	Canada	15 December 2024	World Championships	Budapest, Hungary	

Legend: # – Record awaiting ratification by Swimming Canada; WR – World record; AM – Americas record; CR – Commonwealth record;
Records not set in finals: h – heat; sf – semifinal; r – relay 1st leg; rh – relay heat 1st leg; b – B final; † – en route to final mark; so – swim-off; tt – time trial

=== Women ===
Event	Time		Name	Club	Date	Meet	Location	Ref
50m freestyle	23.49		Taylor Ruck	Canada	23 October 2025	World Cup	Toronto, Canada	
100m freestyle	51.45		Kayla Sanchez	HPC Ontario	14 December 2018	Swim England Winter Championships	Sheffield, Great Britain	
200m freestyle	1:51.49	AM	Mary-Sophie Harvey	Canada	15 December 2024	World Championships	Budapest, Hungary	
400m freestyle	3:50.25	WR	Summer McIntosh	Canada	10 December 2024	World Championships	Budapest, Hungary	
800m freestyle	8:07.12		Summer McIntosh	Canada	5 November 2022	World Cup	Indianapolis, United States	
1500m freestyle	15:49.06		Mary-Sophie Harvey	Canada	19 October 2025	World Cup	Westmont, United States	
50m backstroke	25.25	CR	Maggie Mac Neil	Canada	16 December 2022	World Championships	Melbourne, Australia	
100m backstroke	55.22		Kylie Masse	Canada	17 December 2021	World Championships	Abu Dhabi, United Arab Emirates	
200m backstroke	1:59.96		Summer McIntosh	Canada	15 December 2024	World Championships	Budapest, Hungary	
50m breaststroke	29.91	h	Alexanne Lepage	University of Calgary	14 March 2026	U SPORTS Championships	Markham, Canada	
100m breaststroke	1:04.11		Alexanne Lepage	University of Calgary	12 March 2026	U SPORTS Championships	Markham, Canada	
200m breaststroke	2:16.83		Annamay Pierse	Canada	7 August 2009	British Gas Grand Prix	Leeds, Great Britain	
50m butterfly	24.64	CR	Maggie Mac Neil	Canada	14 December 2022	World Championships	Melbourne, Australia	
100m butterfly	54.05	CR	Maggie Mac Neil	Canada	18 December 2022	World Championships	Melbourne, Australia	
200m butterfly	1:59.32	WR	Summer McIntosh	Canada	12 December 2024	World Championships	Budapest, Hungary	
100m individual medley	57.04	CR	Mary-Sophie Harvey	Canada	13 December 2024	World Championships	Budapest, Hungary	
200m individual medley	2:04.00		Sydney Pickrem	London Roar	21 November 2020	International Swimming League	Budapest, Hungary	
400m individual medley	4:15.48	WR	Summer McIntosh	Canada	14 December 2024	World Championships	Budapest, Hungary	
4×50m freestyle relay	1:35.00		Michelle Williams (24.07); Sandrine Mainville (23.62); Taylor Ruck (23.77); Penny Oleksiak (23.54)	Canada	11 December 2016	World Championships	Windsor, Canada	
4×100m freestyle relay	3:28.06		Rebecca Smith (52.68); Taylor Ruck (51.49); Maggie Mac Neil (51.11); Katerine Savard (52.78)	Canada	13 December 2022	World Championships	Melbourne, Australia	
4×200m freestyle relay	7:32.96		Summer McIntosh (1:54.30); Kayla Sanchez (1:52.97); Katerine Savard (1:54.01); Rebecca Smith (1:51.68)	Canada	20 December 2021	World Championships	Abu Dhabi, United Arab Emirates	
4×50m medley relay	1:43.56		Kylie Masse (25.84); Sydney Pickrem (29.69); Maggie Mac Neil (24.40); Taylor Ruck (23.63)	Canada	17 December 2022	World Championships	Melbourne, Australia	
4×100m medley relay	3:46.22		Ingrid Wilm (55.36); Sydney Pickrem (1:04.42); Maggie Mac Neil (54.59); Taylor Ruck (51.85)	Canada	18 December 2022	World Championships	Melbourne, Australia	

Legend: # – Record awaiting ratification by Swimming Canada; WR – World record; AM – Americas record; CR – Commonwealth record;
Records not set in finals: h – heat; sf – semifinal; r – relay 1st leg; rh – relay heat 1st leg; b – B final; † – en route to final mark; so – swim-off; tt – time trial

=== Mixed relay ===
Event	Time		Name	Club	Date	Meet	Location	Ref
4×50 m freestyle relay	1:28.55		Joshua Liendo (20.94); Yuri Kisil (20.99); Kayla Sanchez (23.51); Maggie Mac Neil (23.11)	Canada	17 December 2021	World Championships	Abu Dhabi, United Arab Emirates	
4×50 m medley relay	1:35.94	CR	Kylie Masse (25.87); Finlay Knox (25.53); Ilya Kharun (20.73); Ingrid Wilm (23.81)	Canada	11 December 2024	World Championships	Budapest, Hungary	
4×100 m medley relay	3:31.97	CR, not officially ratified	Ingrid Wilm (55.82); Finlay Knox (56.39); Ilya Kharun (48.27); Mary-Sophie Harvey (51.49)	Canada	14 December 2024	World Championships	Budapest, Hungary	

Legend: # – Record awaiting ratification by Swimming Canada; WR – World record; AM – Americas record; CR – Commonwealth record;
Records not set in finals: h – heat; so – swim-off
