= Brittany MacLean =

Canadian swimmer

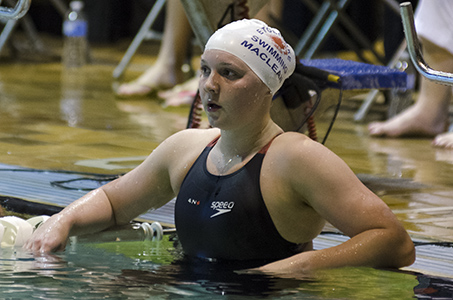

Personal information
- Full name: Brittany MacLean
- National team: Canada
- Born: March 3, 1994 (age 32) Etobicoke, Ontario, Canada
- Height: 1.73 m (5 ft 8 in)
- Weight: 70 kg (154 lb)

Sport
- Sport: Swimming
- Strokes: Freestyle
- Club: Etobicoke Swim Club
- College team: University of Georgia
Medal record
Women's swimming
Representing Canada
Olympic Games
Bronze medal – third place	2016 Rio de Janeiro	4×200 m freestyle
Pan Pacific Championships
Bronze medal – third place	2014 Gold Coast	800 m freestyle
Bronze medal – third place	2014 Gold Coast	1500 m freestyle
Bronze medal – third place	2014 Gold Coast	4×200 m freestyle
Pan American Games
Bronze medal – third place	2015 Toronto	4×200 m freestyle
Commonwealth Games
Silver medal – second place	2014 Glasgow	4×200 m freestyle
Bronze medal – third place	2014 Glasgow	800 m freestyle
Summer Universiade
Bronze medal – third place	2013 Kazan	4×100 m freestyle
Bronze medal – third place	2013 Kazan	4×200 m freestyle

Brittany MacLean (born March 3, 1994) is a Canadian retired competitive swimmer who has represented her country in the Summer Olympics and other international championships. She won a bronze medal in the women's 4 x 200 m freestyle relay at the 2016 Summer Olympics.

== Career ==
Brittany MacLean was first selected as a member of Canada's senior national team in 2011, when she swam at the 2011 World Aquatics Championships in Shanghai, China. She qualified for the 4x200-metre freestyle relay team that finished 7th in the event final. Also in 2011, MacLean was qualified for the 2011 3rd FINA World Junior Swimming Championships in Lima, Peru, where she claimed 2 golds, a silver and a bronze. She claimed gold in the 400-metre and the 200-metre freestyle, silver in the 4x100-metre freestyle relay, and bronze in the 4x200-metre freestyle relay. She set and new junior world record in the 200-metre freestyle with a time of 1.58.93. She attended the Silverthorn Collegiate Institute in Toronto.

She then made her way to the special events and marketing team at the Toronto Blue Jays. She led a team of employees to engage with fans and manage events.

=== 2012 Canadian Olympic Trials, Montreal, Quebec ===
On March 27, 2012, MacLean qualified to her first Olympic team by winning the Women's 400-metre freestyle final with a new Canadian record of 4.06.08. On the third day of the trials, she qualified for the 4x200-metre freestyle relay with her teammate Amanda Reason. Setting a new personal best of 1.58.09. All of this, Brittany wasn't happy with what she made as long as her sister, Heather was joining her on the team. Her sister Heather qualified for the team on her last event the 4x100-metre finishing 3rd with a securing spot to London.

=== 2012 Summer Olympics, London, England ===
At the 2012 Summer Olympics in London, MacLean swam the 400-metre freestyle heats as her first event, while breaking her Canadian record to 4.05.06 which qualified her to sixth in the final. In the final, she finished 7th with a 4.06.24. In her second event, the 4x200-metre freestyle relay, MacLean swam the anchor leg for the relay heats which qualified Canada to third for the final with her teammates Barbara Jardin, Samantha Cheverton and Amanda Reason with a time of 7.50.84. In the final, MacLean and her teammates finished fourth with a time of 7.50.65.

=== 2016 Summer Olympics ===
In 2016, she was officially named to Canada's Olympic team for the 2016 Summer Olympics. MacLean helped the Canadian team win a bronze in the 4x200-metre freestyle relay, but had her performance in individual races hindered by illness, which also had her miss the relay qualifiers. In October, MacLean announced her retirement as she decided to finish her degree in sport management at the University of Georgia. She would later go on to say that she had always planned to leave the sport after the 2016 Olympics stating that it was no longer healthy for her mentally to keep competing along with nagging injuries and that she had wanted to leave the sport while she still loved it.

=== Post-swimming ===
Following her career as a swimmer, MacLean served as a commentator and analyst for CBC Sports coverage of swimming including the 2020 Summer Olympics and the 2023 World Aquatics Championships.

== Personal Bests ==
=== Long course (50 m pool) ===
Event	Time	Venue	Date	Notes
200 m freestyle	1:56.96	2016 Canadian Olympic Trials, Toronto	7 April 2016	NR
400 m freestyle	4:03.84	2016 Canadian Olympic Trials, Toronto	5 April 2016	NR
800 m freestyle	8:20.02	2014 Pan Pacific Swimming Championships, Gold Coast	21 August 2014	NR
1500 m freestyle	15:57.15	2014 Pan Pacific Swimming Championships, Gold Coast	21 August 2014	NR

== Honours ==
In 2012 MacLean was awarded the Queen Elizabeth II Diamond Jubilee Medal.

== See also ==
- List of Olympic medalists in swimming (women)
- List of Commonwealth Games medallists in swimming (women)
- List of University of Georgia people
