= Chronological summary of the 2016 Summer Olympics =

This is a chronological summary of the medal events of the 2016 Summer Olympics in Rio de Janeiro, Brazil. With 306 sets of medals, the games featured 28 Olympic sports, including rugby sevens and golf, which were added to the Olympic program in 2009. These sporting events took place at 33 venues in the host city, and at five in São Paulo, Belo Horizonte, Salvador, Brasília, and Manaus.

Due to the European migrant crisis and other reasons, the International Olympic Committee (IOC) allowed athletes to compete under the Olympic Flag as part of the "Refugee Olympic Team" (ROT); out of 43 refugee athletes deemed potentially eligible, 10 were chosen to form this team. Due to the suspension of the National Olympic Committee of Kuwait, participants from Kuwait were allowed to participate under the Olympic Flag as "Independent Olympic Athletes" (IOA).

== Calendar ==
This is currently based on the schedule released on the same day as ticket sales began, 31 March 2015.

All dates are Brasília Time (UTC–3)

OC	Opening ceremony	●	Event competitions	1	Gold medal events	EG	Exhibition gala	CC	Closing ceremony

August 2016		3rd Wed	4th Thu	5th Fri	6th Sat	7th Sun	8th Mon	9th Tue	10th Wed	11th Thu	12th Fri	13th Sat	14th Sun	15th Mon	16th Tue	17th Wed	18th Thu	19th Fri	20th Sat	21st Sun	Events
Ceremonies				OC																CC	—N/a
Aquatics
Aquatics	Diving					1	1	1	1		●	●	1	●	1	●	1	●	1		46
Aquatics	Marathon swimming													1	1						46
Aquatics	Swimming				4	4	4	4	4	4	4	4									46
Aquatics	Synchronized swimming												●	●	1		●	1			46
Aquatics	Water polo				●		●	●	●	●	●	●	●	●	●	●	●	1	1		46
Archery				●	1	1	●	●	●	1	1										4
Athletics											3	5	4	5	5	4	6	7	7	1	47
Badminton										●	●	●	●	●	●	1	1	2	1		5
Basketball					●	●	●	●	●	●	●	●	●	●	●	●	●	●	1	1	2
Boxing					●	●	●	●	●	●	●	●	1	1	1	1	1	1	3	4	13
Canoeing	Slalom					●	●	1	1	2											16
Canoeing	Sprint													●	4	●	4	●	4		16
Cycling	Road cycling				1	1			2												18
Cycling	Track cycling									1	2	2	1	1	3						18
Cycling	BMX															●	●	2			18
Cycling	Mountain biking																		1	1	18
Equestrian					●	●	●	2	●	●	1		●	1	●	1		1			6
Fencing					1	1	1	1	2	1	1	1	1								10
Field hockey					●	●	●	●	●	●	●	●	●	●	●	●	1	1			2
Football		●	●		●	●		●	●		●	●			●	●		1	1		2
Golf										●	●	●	1			●	●	●	1		2
Gymnastics	Artistic				●	●	1	1	1	1			4	3	3	EG					18
Gymnastics	Rhythmic																	●	1	1	18
Gymnastics	Trampolining										1	1									18
Handball					●	●	●	●	●	●	●	●	●	●	●	●	●	●	1	1	2
Judo					2	2	2	2	2	2	2										14
Modern pentathlon																	●	1	1		2
Rowing					●	●	●	●	2	4	4	4									14
Rugby sevens					●	●	1	●	●	1											2
Sailing							●	●	●	●	●	●	2	2	2	2	2				10
Shooting					2	2	2	1	2	1	2	2	1								15
Table tennis					●	●	●	●	1	1	●	●	●	●	1	1					4
Taekwondo																2	2	2	2		8
Tennis					●	●	●	●	●	●	1	1	3								5
Triathlon																	1		1		2
Volleyball	Beach volleyball				●	●	●	●	●	●	●	●	●	●	●	1	1				4
Volleyball	Indoor volleyball				●	●	●	●	●	●	●	●	●	●	●	●	●	●	1	1	4
Weightlifting					1	2	2	2	2		2	1	1	1	1						15
Wrestling													2	2	2	3	3	2	2	2	18
Daily medal events					12	14	14	15	20	19	24	21	22	17	25	16	23	22	30	12	306
Cumulative total					12	26	40	55	75	94	118	139	161	178	203	219	242	264	294	306	306
August 2016		3rd Wed	4th Thu	5th Fri	6th Sat	7th Sun	8th Mon	9th Tue	10th Wed	11th Thu	12th Fri	13th Sat	14th Sun	15th Mon	16th Tue	17th Wed	18th Thu	19th Fri	20th Sat	21st Sun	Events

== Day-by-day summaries ==
=== Day 1: 6 August ===
Sport	Event	Gold medalist(s)			Silver medalist(s)		Bronze medalist(s)		Ref
Sport	Event	Competitor(s)	NOC	Rec	Competitor(s)	NOC	Competitor(s)	NOC	Ref
Archery	Men's team	Kim Woo-jin; Ku Bon-chan; Lee Seung-yun	South Korea		Brady Ellison; Zach Garrett; Jake Kaminski	United States	Alec Potts; Ryan Tyack; Taylor Worth	Australia	
Cycling	Men's road race	Greg Van Avermaet	Belgium		Jakob Fuglsang	Denmark	Rafał Majka	Poland	
Fencing	Women's épée	Emese Szász	Hungary		Rossella Fiamingo	Italy	Sun Yiwen	China	
Judo	Men's 60 kg	Beslan Mudranov	Russia		Yeldos Smetov	Kazakhstan	Naohisa Takato	Japan	
Judo	Men's 60 kg	Beslan Mudranov	Russia		Yeldos Smetov	Kazakhstan	Diyorbek Urozboev	Uzbekistan	
Judo	Women's 48 kg	Paula Pareto	Argentina		Jeong Bo-kyeong	South Korea	Ami Kondo	Japan	
Judo	Women's 48 kg	Paula Pareto	Argentina		Jeong Bo-kyeong	South Korea	Galbadrakhyn Otgontsetseg	Kazakhstan	
Shooting	Men's 10 m air pistol	Hoàng Xuân Vinh	Vietnam	OR	Felipe Almeida Wu	Brazil	Pang Wei	China	
Shooting	Women's 10 m air rifle	Virginia Thrasher	United States	OR	Du Li	China	Yi Siling	China	
Swimming	Men's 400 m freestyle	Mack Horton	Australia		Sun Yang	China	Gabriele Detti	Italy	
Swimming	Men's 400 m individual medley	Kosuke Hagino	Japan		Chase Kalisz	United States	Daiya Seto	Japan	
Swimming	Women's 400 m individual medley	Katinka Hosszú	Hungary	WR	Maya DiRado	United States	Mireia Belmonte	Spain	
Swimming	Women's 4 × 100 m freestyle relay	Emma McKeon; Brittany Elmslie; Bronte Campbell; Cate Campbell; Madison Wilson*	Australia	WR	Simone Manuel; Abbey Weitzeil; Dana Vollmer; Katie Ledecky; Amanda Weir*; Lia Neal*; Allison Schmitt*	United States	Sandrine Mainville; Chantal Van Landeghem; Taylor Ruck; Penny Oleksiak; Michelle Williams*	Canada	
Weightlifting	Women's 48 kg	Sopita Tanasan	Thailand		Sri Wahyuni Agustiani	Indonesia	Hiromi Miyake	Japan	

=== Day 2: 7 August ===
Sport	Event	Gold medalist(s)			Silver medalist(s)		Bronze medalist(s)		Ref
Sport	Event	Competitor(s)	NOC	Rec	Competitor(s)	NOC	Competitor(s)	NOC	Ref
Archery	Women's team	Chang Hye-jin; Choi Mi-sun; Ki Bo-bae	South Korea		Tuyana Dashidorzhieva; Ksenia Perova; Inna Stepanova	Russia	Le Chien-ying; Lin Shih-chia; Tan Ya-ting	Chinese Taipei	
Cycling	Women's road race	Anna van der Breggen	Netherlands		Emma Johansson	Sweden	Elisa Longo Borghini	Italy	
Diving	Women's synchronized 3 m springboard	Shi Tingmao; Wu Minxia	China		Tania Cagnotto; Francesca Dallapé	Italy	Maddison Keeney; Anabelle Smith	Australia	
Fencing	Men's foil	Daniele Garozzo	Italy		Alexander Massialas	United States	Timur Safin	Russia	
Judo	Men's 66 kg	Fabio Basile	Italy		An Ba-ul	South Korea	Rishod Sobirov	Uzbekistan	
Judo	Men's 66 kg	Fabio Basile	Italy		An Ba-ul	South Korea	Masashi Ebinuma	Japan	
Judo	Women's 52 kg	Majlinda Kelmendi	Kosovo		Odette Giuffrida	Italy	Misato Nakamura	Japan	
Judo	Women's 52 kg	Majlinda Kelmendi	Kosovo		Odette Giuffrida	Italy	Natalia Kuziutina	Russia	
Shooting	Women's 10 metre air pistol	Zhang Mengxue	China	OR	Vitalina Batsarashkina	Russia	Anna Korakaki	Greece	
Shooting	Women's trap	Catherine Skinner	Australia		Natalie Rooney	New Zealand	Corey Cogdell	United States	
Swimming	Men's 100 m breaststroke	Adam Peaty	Great Britain	WR	Cameron van der Burgh	South Africa	Cody Miller	United States	
Swimming	Men's 4 × 100 m freestyle relay	Ryan Held; Caeleb Dressel; Michael Phelps; Nathan Adrian; Jimmy Feigen*; Blake Pieroni*; Anthony Ervin*	United States		Mehdy Metella; Fabien Gilot; Florent Manaudou; Jérémy Stravius; Clément Mignon*; William Meynard*	France	James Roberts; Kyle Chalmers; James Magnussen; Cameron McEvoy; Matthew Abood*	Australia	
Swimming	Women's 400 m freestyle	Katie Ledecky	United States	WR	Jazmin Carlin	Great Britain	Leah Smith	United States	
Swimming	Women's 100 m butterfly	Sarah Sjöström	Sweden	WR	Penny Oleksiak	Canada	Dana Vollmer	United States	
Weightlifting	Men's 56 kg	Long Qingquan	China	WR	Om Yun-chol	North Korea	Sinphet Kruaithong	Thailand	
Weightlifting	Women's 53 kg	Hsu Shu-ching	Chinese Taipei		Hidilyn Diaz	Philippines	Yoon Jin-hee	South Korea	

=== Day 3: 8 August ===
Sport	Event	Gold medalist(s)			Silver medalist(s)		Bronze medalist(s)		Ref
Sport	Event	Competitor(s)	NOC	Rec	Competitor(s)	NOC	Competitor(s)	NOC	Ref
Diving	Men's synchronized 10 m platform	Chen Aysén; Lin Yue	China		David Boudia; Steele Johnson	United States	Tom Daley; Daniel Goodfellow	Great Britain	
Fencing	Women's sabre	Yana Egorian	Russia		Sofiya Velikaya	Russia	Olha Kharlan	Ukraine	
Gymnastics	Men's artistic team all-around	Ryōhei Katō; Kenzō Shirai; Yūsuke Tanaka; Koji Yamamuro; Kōhei Uchimura	Japan		Denis Ablyazin; David Belyavskiy; Ivan Stretovich; Nikolai Kuksenkov; Nikita Nagornyy	Russia	Deng Shudi; Lin Chaopan; Liu Yang; You Hao; Zhang Chenglong	China	
Judo	Men's 73 kg	Shohei Ono	Japan		Rustam Orujov	Azerbaijan	Lasha Shavdatuashvili	Georgia	
Judo	Men's 73 kg	Shohei Ono	Japan		Rustam Orujov	Azerbaijan	Dirk Van Tichelt	Belgium	
Judo	Women's 57 kg	Rafaela Silva	Brazil		Dorjsürengiin Sumiyaa	Mongolia	Telma Monteiro	Portugal	
Judo	Women's 57 kg	Rafaela Silva	Brazil		Dorjsürengiin Sumiyaa	Mongolia	Kaori Matsumoto	Japan	
Rugby sevens	Women's	Nicole Beck; Charlotte Caslick; Emilee Cherry; Chloe Dalton; Gemma Etheridge; Ellia Green; Shannon Parry; Evania Pelite; Alicia Quirk; Emma Tonegato; Amy Turner; Sharni Williams	Australia		Shakira Baker; Kelly Brazier; Gayle Broughton; Theresa Fitzpatrick; Sarah Goss; Huriana Manuel; Kayla McAlister; Tyla Nathan-Wong; Terina Te Tamaki; Ruby Tui; Niall Williams; Portia Woodman	New Zealand	Brittany Benn; Hannah Darling; Bianca Farella; Jen Kish; Ghislaine Landry; Megan Lukan; Kayla Moleschi; Karen Paquin; Kelly Russell; Ashley Steacy; Natasha Watcham-Roy; Charity Williams	Canada	
Shooting	Men's 10 m air rifle	Niccolò Campriani	Italy	OR	Serhiy Kulish	Ukraine	Vladimir Maslennikov	Russia	
Shooting	Men's trap	Josip Glasnović	Croatia		Giovanni Pellielo	Italy	Edward Ling	Great Britain	
Swimming	Men's 200 m freestyle	Sun Yang	China		Chad le Clos	South Africa	Conor Dwyer	United States	
Swimming	Men's 100 m backstroke	Ryan Murphy	United States	OR	Xu Jiayu	China	David Plummer	United States	
Swimming	Women's 100 m backstroke	Katinka Hosszú	Hungary		Kathleen Baker	United States	Kylie Masse	Canada	
Swimming	Women's 100 m backstroke	Katinka Hosszú	Hungary		Kathleen Baker	United States	Fu Yuanhui	China	
Swimming	Women's 100 m breaststroke	Lilly King	United States	OR	Yuliya Yefimova	Russia	Katie Meili	United States	
Weightlifting	Men's 62 kg	Óscar Figueroa	Colombia		Eko Yuli Irawan	Indonesia	Farkhad Kharki	Kazakhstan	
Weightlifting	Women's 58 kg	Sukanya Srisurat	Thailand	OR	Pimsiri Sirikaew	Thailand	Kuo Hsing-chun	Chinese Taipei	

=== Day 4: 9 August ===
Sport	Event	Gold medalist(s)			Silver medalist(s)		Bronze medalist(s)		Ref
Sport	Event	Competitor(s)	NOC	Rec	Competitor(s)	NOC	Competitor(s)	NOC	Ref
Canoeing	Men's slalom C-1	Denis Gargaud Chanut	France		Matej Beňuš	Slovakia	Takuya Haneda	Japan	
Diving	Women's synchronized 10 m platform	Chen Ruolin; Liu Huixia	China		Cheong Jun Hoong; Pandelela Rinong	Malaysia	Meaghan Benfeito; Roseline Filion	Canada	
Equestrian	Individual eventing	Michael Jung	Germany		Astier Nicolas	France	Phillip Dutton	United States	
Equestrian	Team eventing	Karim Laghouag; Thibaut Vallette; Mathieu Lemoine; Astier Nicolas	France		Julia Krajewski; Sandra Auffarth; Ingrid Klimke; Michael Jung	Germany	Shane Rose; Stuart Tinney; Sam Griffiths; Chris Burton	Australia	
Fencing	Men's épée	Park Sang-young	South Korea		Géza Imre	Hungary	Gauthier Grumier	France	
Gymnastics	Women's artistic team all-around	Simone Biles; Gabby Douglas; Laurie Hernandez; Madison Kocian; Aly Raisman	United States		Angelina Melnikova; Aliya Mustafina; Maria Paseka; Daria Spiridonova; Seda Tutkhalyan	Russia	Fan Yilin; Mao Yi; Shang Chunsong; Tan Jiaxin; Wang Yan	China	
Judo	Men's 81 kg	Khasan Khalmurzaev	Russia		Travis Stevens	United States	Sergiu Toma	United Arab Emirates	
Judo	Men's 81 kg	Khasan Khalmurzaev	Russia		Travis Stevens	United States	Takanori Nagase	Japan	
Judo	Women's 63 kg	Tina Trstenjak	Slovenia		Clarisse Agbegnenou	France	Yarden Gerbi	Israel	
Judo	Women's 63 kg	Tina Trstenjak	Slovenia		Clarisse Agbegnenou	France	Anicka van Emden	Netherlands	
Shooting	Women's 25 metre pistol	Anna Korakaki	Greece		Monika Karsch	Germany	Heidi Diethelm Gerber	Switzerland	
Swimming	Men's 200 m butterfly	Michael Phelps	United States		Masato Sakai	Japan	Tamás Kenderesi	Hungary	
Swimming	Men's 4 × 200 m freestyle relay	Conor Dwyer; Townley Haas; Ryan Lochte; Michael Phelps; Clark Smith*; Jack Conger*; Gunnar Bentz*	United States		Stephen Milne; Duncan Scott; Daniel Wallace; James Guy; Robbie Renwick *	Great Britain	Kosuke Hagino; Naito Ehara; Yuki Kobori; Takeshi Matsuda	Japan	
Swimming	Women's 200 metre freestyle	Katie Ledecky	United States		Sarah Sjöström	Sweden	Emma McKeon	Australia	
Swimming	Women's 200 metre individual medley	Katinka Hosszú	Hungary	OR	Siobhan-Marie O'Connor	Great Britain	Maya DiRado	United States	
Weightlifting	Men's 69 kg	Shi Zhiyong	China		Daniyar Ismayilov	Turkey	Luis Javier Mosquera	Colombia	
Weightlifting	Women's 63 kg	Deng Wei	China	WR	Choe Hyo-sim	North Korea	Karina Goricheva	Kazakhstan	

=== Day 5: 10 August ===
Sport	Event	Gold medalist(s)			Silver medalist(s)		Bronze medalist(s)		Ref
Sport	Event	Competitor(s)	NOC	Rec	Competitor(s)	NOC	Competitor(s)	NOC	Ref
Canoeing	Men's slalom K-1	Joe Clarke	Great Britain		Peter Kauzer	Slovenia	Jiří Prskavec	Czech Republic	
Cycling	Men's road time trial	Fabian Cancellara	Switzerland		Tom Dumoulin	Netherlands	Chris Froome	Great Britain	
Cycling	Women's road time trial	Kristin Armstrong	United States		Olga Zabelinskaya	Russia	Anna van der Breggen	Netherlands	
Diving	Men's synchronized 3 m springboard	Chris Mears; Jack Laugher	Great Britain		Sam Dorman; Michael Hixon	United States	Cao Yuan; Qin Kai	China	
Fencing	Men's sabre	Áron Szilágyi	Hungary		Daryl Homer	United States	Kim Jung-hwan	South Korea	
Fencing	Women's foil	Inna Deriglazova	Russia		Elisa Di Francisca	Italy	Inès Boubakri	Tunisia	
Gymnastics	Men's artistic individual all-around	Kōhei Uchimura	Japan		Oleg Verniaiev	Ukraine	Max Whitlock	Great Britain	
Judo	Men's 90 kg	Mashu Baker	Japan		Varlam Liparteliani	Georgia	Gwak Dong-han	South Korea	
Judo	Men's 90 kg	Mashu Baker	Japan		Varlam Liparteliani	Georgia	Cheng Xunzhao	China	
Judo	Women's 70 kg	Haruka Tachimoto	Japan		Yuri Alvear	Colombia	Sally Conway	Great Britain	
Judo	Women's 70 kg	Haruka Tachimoto	Japan		Yuri Alvear	Colombia	Laura Vargas Koch	Germany	
Rowing	Men's quadruple sculls	Postponed and rescheduled							
Rowing	Women's quadruple sculls	Postponed and rescheduled							
Shooting	Men's 50 m pistol	Jin Jong-oh	South Korea	OR	Hoàng Xuân Vinh	Vietnam	Kim Song-guk	North Korea	
Shooting	Men's double trap	Fehaid Al-Deehani	Independent Olympic Athletes		Marco Innocenti	Italy	Steven Scott	Great Britain	
Swimming	Men's 100 m freestyle	Kyle Chalmers	Australia		Pieter Timmers	Belgium	Nathan Adrian	United States	
Swimming	Men's 200 m breaststroke	Dmitriy Balandin	Kazakhstan		Josh Prenot	United States	Anton Chupkov	Russia	
Swimming	Women's 200 m butterfly	Mireia Belmonte	Spain		Madeline Groves	Australia	Natsumi Hoshi	Japan	
Swimming	Women's 4 × 200 m freestyle relay	Allison Schmitt; Leah Smith; Maya DiRado; Katie Ledecky; Missy Franklin*; Melanie Margalis*; Cierra Runge*	United States		Leah Neale; Emma McKeon; Bronte Barratt; Tamsin Cook; Jessica Ashwood*	Australia	Katerine Savard; Taylor Ruck; Penny Oleksiak; Brittany MacLean; Emily Overholt*; Kennedy Goss*	Canada	
Table tennis	Women's singles	Ding Ning	China		Li Xiaoxia	China	Kim Song-i	North Korea	
Weightlifting	Men's 77 kg	Nijat Rahimov	Kazakhstan	WR	Lü Xiaojun	China	Mohamed Mahmoud	Egypt	
Weightlifting	Women's 69 kg	Xiang Yanmei	China		Zhazira Zhapparkul	Kazakhstan	Sara Ahmed	Egypt	

=== Day 6: 11 August ===
Sport	Event	Gold medalist(s)			Silver medalist(s)		Bronze medalist(s)		Ref
Sport	Event	Competitor(s)	NOC	Rec	Competitor(s)	NOC	Competitor(s)	NOC	Ref
Archery	Women's individual	Chang Hye-jin	South Korea		Lisa Unruh	Germany	Ki Bo-bae	South Korea	
Canoeing	Men's slalom C-2	Ladislav Škantár; Peter Škantár	Slovakia		David Florence; Richard Hounslow	Great Britain	Gauthier Klauss; Matthieu Péché	France	
Canoeing	Women's slalom K-1	Maialen Chourraut	Spain		Luuka Jones	New Zealand	Jessica Fox	Australia	
Cycling	Men's team sprint	Philip Hindes; Jason Kenny; Callum Skinner	Great Britain		Eddie Dawkins; Ethan Mitchell; Sam Webster	New Zealand	Grégory Baugé; François Pervis; Michaël D'Almeida	France	
Fencing	Women's team épée	Simona Gherman; Simona Pop; Ana Maria Popescu	Romania		Hao Jialu; Sun Yiwen; Sun Yujie; Xu Anqi	China	Olga Kochneva; Violetta Kolobova; Tatiana Logunova; Lyubov Shutova	Russia	
Gymnastics	Women's artistic individual all-around	Simone Biles	United States		Aly Raisman	United States	Aliya Mustafina	Russia	
Judo	Men's 100 kg	Lukáš Krpálek	Czech Republic		Elmar Gasimov	Azerbaijan	Ryunosuke Haga	Japan	
Judo	Men's 100 kg	Lukáš Krpálek	Czech Republic		Elmar Gasimov	Azerbaijan	Cyrille Maret	France	
Judo	Women's 78 kg	Kayla Harrison	United States		Audrey Tcheuméo	France	Mayra Aguiar	Brazil	
Judo	Women's 78 kg	Kayla Harrison	United States		Audrey Tcheuméo	France	Anamari Velenšek	Slovenia	
Rowing	Men's coxless pair	Hamish Bond; Eric Murray	New Zealand		Lawrence Brittain; Shaun Keeling	South Africa	Giovanni Abagnale; Marco Di Costanzo	Italy	
Rowing	Men's double sculls	Martin Sinković; Valent Sinković	Croatia		Mindaugas Griškonis; Saulius Ritter	Lithuania	Kjetil Borch; Olaf Tufte	Norway	
Rowing	Men's quadruple sculls	Philipp Wende; Lauritz Schoof; Karl Schulze; Hans Gruhne	Germany		Karsten Forsterling; Alexander Belonogoff; Cameron Girdlestone; James McRae	Australia	Andrei Jämsä; Allar Raja; Tõnu Endrekson; Kaspar Taimsoo	Estonia	
Rowing	Men's lightweight coxless four	Mario Gyr; Simon Niepmann; Simon Schürch; Lucas Tramèr	Switzerland		Jacob Barsøe; Jacob Larsen; Kasper Winther Jørgensen; Morten Jørgensen	Denmark	Franck Solforosi; Thomas Baroukh; Guillaume Raineau; Thibault Colard	France	
Rowing	Women's double sculls	Magdalena Fularczyk-Kozłowska; Natalia Madaj	Poland		Victoria Thornley; Katherine Grainger	Great Britain	Donata Vištartaitė; Milda Valčiukaitė	Lithuania	
Rowing	Women's quadruple sculls	Carina Bär; Julia Lier; Lisa Schmidla; Annekatrin Thiele	Germany		Chantal Achterberg; Nicole Beukers; Inge Janssen; Carline Bouw	Netherlands	Maria Springwald; Joanna Leszczyńska; Agnieszka Kobus; Monika Ciaciuch	Poland	
Rugby sevens	Men's	Masivesi Dakuwaqa; Apisai Domolailai; Osea Kolinisau; Semi Kunatani; Viliame Mata; Leone Nakarawa; Vatemo Ravouvou; Savenaca Rawaca; Kitione Taliga; Josua Tuisova; Jerry Tuwai; Jasa Veremalua; Samisoni Viriviri	Fiji		Mark Robertson; Ruaridh McConnochie; Phil Burgess; Dan Norton; James Rodwell; Tom Mitchell; Dan Bibby; James Davies; Ollie Lindsay-Hague; Sam Cross; Marcus Watson; Mark Bennett	Great Britain	Cecil Afrika; Tim Agaba; Kyle Brown; Juan de Jongh; Justin Geduld; François Hougaard; Werner Kok; Cheslin Kolbe; Dylan Sage; Seabelo Senatla; Kwagga Smith; Philip Snyman; Rosko Specman	South Africa	
Shooting	Women's 50 m rifle three positions	Barbara Engleder	Germany		Zhang Binbin	China	Du Li	China	
Swimming	Men's 200 m backstroke	Ryan Murphy	United States		Mitch Larkin	Australia	Evgeny Rylov	Russia	
Swimming	Men's 200 m individual medley	Michael Phelps	United States		Kosuke Hagino	Japan	Wang Shun	China	
Swimming	Women's 100 m freestyle	Simone Manuel	United States	OR	Not awarded due to a tie for gold		Sarah Sjöström	Sweden	
Swimming	Women's 100 m freestyle	Penny Oleksiak	Canada	OR	Not awarded due to a tie for gold		Sarah Sjöström	Sweden	
Swimming	Women's 200 m breaststroke	Rie Kaneto	Japan		Yuliya Yefimova	Russia	Shi Jinglin	China	
Table tennis	Men's singles	Ma Long	China		Zhang Jike	China	Jun Mizutani	Japan	

=== Day 7: 12 August ===
Sport	Event	Gold medalist(s)			Silver medalist(s)		Bronze medalist(s)		Ref
Sport	Event	Competitor(s)	NOC	Rec	Competitor(s)	NOC	Competitor(s)	NOC	Ref
Archery	Men's individual	Ku Bon-chan	South Korea		Jean-Charles Valladont	France	Brady Ellison	United States	
Athletics	Men's 20 km walk	Wang Zhen	China		Cai Zelin	China	Dane Bird-Smith	Australia	
Athletics	Women's 10,000 m	Almaz Ayana	Ethiopia	WR	Vivian Cheruiyot	Kenya	Tirunesh Dibaba	Ethiopia	
Athletics	Women's shot put	Michelle Carter	United States		Valerie Adams	New Zealand	Anita Márton	Hungary	
Cycling	Men's team pursuit	Steven Burke; Ed Clancy; Owain Doull; Bradley Wiggins	Great Britain	WR	Alex Edmondson; Jack Bobridge; Michael Hepburn; Sam Welsford; Callum Scotson	Australia	Lasse Norman Hansen; Niklas Larsen; Frederik Madsen; Casper von Folsach; Rasmus Quaade	Denmark	
Cycling	Women's team sprint	Gong Jinjie; Zhong Tianshi	China		Daria Shmeleva; Anastasiia Voinova	Russia	Miriam Welte; Kristina Vogel	Germany	
Equestrian	Team dressage	Kristina Broring-Sprehe; Sonke Rothenberger; Dorothee Schneider; Isabell Werth	Germany		Spencer Wilton; Fiona Bigwood; Carl Hester; Charlotte Dujardin	Great Britain	Allison Brock; Kasey Perry-Glass; Steffen Peters; Laura Graves	United States	
Fencing	Men's team foil	Artur Akhmatkhuzin; Alexey Cheremisinov; Timur Safin	Russia		Enzo Lefort; Jérémy Cadot; Erwann Le Péchoux	France	Gerek Meinhardt; Alexander Massialas; Miles Chamley-Watson	United States	
Gymnastics	Women's trampoline	Rosannagh MacLennan	Canada		Bryony Page	Great Britain	Li Dan	China	
Judo	Men's +100 kg	Teddy Riner	France		Hisayoshi Harasawa	Japan	Or Sasson	Israel	
Judo	Men's +100 kg	Teddy Riner	France		Hisayoshi Harasawa	Japan	Rafael Silva	Brazil	
Judo	Women's +78 kg	Émilie Andéol	France		Idalys Ortiz	Cuba	Kanae Yamabe	Japan	
Judo	Women's +78 kg	Émilie Andéol	France		Idalys Ortiz	Cuba	Yu Song	China	
Rowing	Men's lightweight double sculls	Jérémie Azou; Pierre Houin	France		Gary O'Donovan; Paul O'Donovan	Ireland	Kristoffer Brun; Are Strandli	Norway	
Rowing	Men's coxless four	Alex Gregory; Constantine Louloudis; George Nash; Moe Sbihi	Great Britain		William Lockwood; Josh Dunkley-Smith; Josh Booth; Alexander Hill	Australia	Domenico Montrone; Matteo Castaldo; Matteo Lodo; Giuseppe Vicino	Italy	
Rowing	Women's coxless pair	Helen Glover; Heather Stanning	Great Britain		Genevieve Behrent; Rebecca Scown	New Zealand	Hedvig Rasmussen; Anne Andersen	Denmark	
Rowing	Women's lightweight double sculls	Maaike Head; Ilse Paulis	Netherlands		Lindsay Jennerich; Patricia Obee	Canada	Huang Wenyi; Pan Feihong	China	
Shooting	Men's 50 m rifle prone	Henri Junghänel	Germany		Kim Jong-hyun	South Korea	Kirill Grigoryan	Russia	
Shooting	Women's skeet	Diana Bacosi	Italy		Chiara Cainero	Italy	Kim Rhode	United States	
Swimming	Men's 50 m freestyle	Anthony Ervin	United States		Florent Manaudou	France	Nathan Adrian	United States	
Swimming	Men's 100 m butterfly	Joseph Schooling	Singapore	OR, AR	Michael Phelps	United States	Not awarded due to a tie for silver		
Swimming	Men's 100 m butterfly	Joseph Schooling	Singapore	OR, AR	Chad le Clos	South Africa	Not awarded due to a tie for silver		
Swimming	Men's 100 m butterfly	Joseph Schooling	Singapore	OR, AR	László Cseh	Hungary	Not awarded due to a tie for silver		
Swimming	Women's 800 m freestyle	Katie Ledecky	United States	WR	Jazmin Carlin	Great Britain	Boglárka Kapás	Hungary	
Swimming	Women's 200 m backstroke	Maya DiRado	United States		Katinka Hosszú	Hungary	Hilary Caldwell	Canada	
Tennis	Men's doubles	Marc López; Rafael Nadal	Spain		Florin Mergea; Horia Tecău	Romania	Steve Johnson; Jack Sock	United States	
Weightlifting	Men's 85 kg	Kianoush Rostami	Iran	WR	Tian Tao	China	Gabriel Sîncrăian	Romania	
Weightlifting	Women's 75 kg	Rim Jong-sim	North Korea		Darya Naumava	Belarus	Lydia Valentín	Spain	

=== Day 8: 13 August ===
Sport	Event	Gold medalist(s)			Silver medalist(s)		Bronze medalist(s)		Ref
Sport	Event	Competitor(s)	NOC	Rec	Competitor(s)	NOC	Competitor(s)	NOC	Ref
Athletics	Men's 10,000 m	Mo Farah	Great Britain		Paul Tanui	Kenya	Tamirat Tola	Ethiopia	
Athletics	Men's long jump	Jeff Henderson	United States		Luvo Manyonga	South Africa	Greg Rutherford	Great Britain	
Athletics	Men's discus throw	Christoph Harting	Germany		Piotr Małachowski	Poland	Daniel Jasinski	Germany	
Athletics	Women's 100 m	Elaine Thompson	Jamaica		Tori Bowie	United States	Shelly-Ann Fraser-Pryce	Jamaica	
Athletics	Women's heptathlon	Nafissatou Thiam	Belgium		Jessica Ennis-Hill	Great Britain	Brianne Theisen-Eaton	Canada	
Cycling	Women's Keirin	Elis Ligtlee	Netherlands		Becky James	Great Britain	Anna Meares	Australia	
Cycling	Women's team pursuit	Katie Archibald; Elinor Barker; Joanna Rowsell-Shand; Laura Trott	Great Britain	WR	Sarah Hammer; Kelly Catlin; Chloé Dygert; Jennifer Valente	United States	Allison Beveridge; Jasmin Glaesser; Kirsti Lay; Georgia Simmerling; Laura Brown	Canada	
Fencing	Women's team sabre	Yekaterina Dyachenko; Yana Egorian; Yuliya Gavrilova; Sofya Velikaya	Russia		Olha Kharlan; Olena Kravatska; Alina Komashchuk; Olena Voronina	Ukraine	Monica Aksamit; Ibtihaj Muhammad; Dagmara Wozniak; Mariel Zagunis	United States	
Gymnastics	Men's trampoline	Uladzislau Hancharou	Belarus		Dong Dong	China	Lei Gao	China	
Rowing	Men's single sculls	Mahé Drysdale	New Zealand		Damir Martin	Croatia	Ondřej Synek	Czech Republic	
Rowing	Men's eight	Paul Bennett; Scott Durant; Matt Gotrel; Phelan Hill; Matt Langridge; Tom Ransley; Pete Reed; Will Satch; Andrew Triggs Hodge	Great Britain		Maximilian Munski; Malte Jakschik; Andreas Kuffner; Eric Johannesen; Maximilian Reinelt; Felix Drahotta; Richard Schmidt; Hannes Ocik; Martin Sauer	Germany	Kaj Hendriks; Robert Lücken; Boaz Meylink; Boudewijn Röell; Olivier Siegelaar; Dirk Uittenbogaard; Mechiel Versluis; Tone Wieten; Peter Wiersum	Netherlands	
Rowing	Women's single sculls	Kim Brennan	Australia		Genevra Stone	United States	Duan Jingli	China	
Rowing	Women's eight	Amanda Elmore; Tessa Gobbo; Elle Logan; Meghan Musnicki; Amanda Polk; Emily Regan; Lauren Schmetterling; Kerry Simmonds; Katelin Snyder	United States		Katie Greves; Melanie Wilson; Frances Houghton; Polly Swann; Jessica Eddie; Olivia Carnegie-Brown; Karen Bennett; Zoe Lee; Zoe de Toledo	Great Britain	Roxana Cogianu; Ioana Strungaru; Mihaela Petrilă; Iuliana Popa; Mădălina Beres; Laura Oprea; Adelina Boguș; Andreea Boghian; Daniela Druncea	Romania	
Shooting	Men's 25 m rapid fire pistol	Christian Reitz	Germany		Jean Quiquampoix	France	Li Yuehong	China	
Shooting	Men's skeet	Gabriele Rossetti	Italy		Marcus Svensson	Sweden	Abdullah Al-Rashidi	Independent Olympic Athletes	
Swimming	Men's 1500 m freestyle	Gregorio Paltrinieri	Italy		Connor Jaeger	United States	Gabriele Detti	Italy	
Swimming	Men's 4 × 100 m medley relay	Ryan Murphy WR; Cody Miller; Michael Phelps; Nathan Adrian; David Plummer*; Kevin Cordes*; Tom Shields*; Caeleb Dressel*	United States	OR	Chris Walker-Hebborn; Adam Peaty; James Guy; Duncan Scott	Great Britain	Mitch Larkin; Jake Packard; David Morgan; Kyle Chalmers; Cameron McEvoy*	Australia	
Swimming	Women's 50 m freestyle	Pernille Blume	Denmark		Simone Manuel	United States	Aliaksandra Herasimenia	Belarus	
Swimming	Women's 4 × 100 m medley relay	Kathleen Baker; Lilly King; Dana Vollmer; Simone Manuel; Olivia Smoliga*; Katie Meili*; Kelsi Worrell*; Abbey Weitzeil*	United States		Emily Seebohm; Taylor McKeown; Emma McKeon; Cate Campbell; Madison Wilson*; Madeline Groves*; Brittany Elmslie*	Australia	Mie Nielsen; Rikke Møller Pedersen; Jeanette Ottesen; Pernille Blume	Denmark	
Tennis	Women's singles	Monica Puig	Puerto Rico		Angelique Kerber	Germany	Petra Kvitová	Czech Republic	
Weightlifting	Men's 94 kg	Sohrab Moradi	Iran		Vadzim Straltsou	Belarus	Aurimas Didžbalis	Lithuania	

=== Day 9: 14 August ===
Sport	Event	Gold medalist(s)			Silver medalist(s)		Bronze medalist(s)		Ref
Sport	Event	Competitor(s)	NOC	Rec	Competitor(s)	NOC	Competitor(s)	NOC	Ref
Athletics	Men's 100 m	Usain Bolt	Jamaica		Justin Gatlin	United States	Andre De Grasse	Canada	
Athletics	Men's 400 m	Wayde van Niekerk	South Africa	WR	Kirani James	Grenada	LaShawn Merritt	United States	
Athletics	Women's marathon	Jemima Sumgong	Kenya		Eunice Kirwa	Bahrain	Mare Dibaba	Ethiopia	
Athletics	Women's triple jump	Caterine Ibargüen	Colombia		Yulimar Rojas	Venezuela	Olga Rypakova	Kazakhstan	
Boxing	Men's light flyweight	Hasanboy Dusmatov	Uzbekistan		Yuberjén Martínez	Colombia	Joahnys Argilagos †	Cuba	
Boxing	Men's light flyweight	Hasanboy Dusmatov	Uzbekistan		Yuberjén Martínez	Colombia	Nico Hernández †	United States	
Cycling	Men's sprint	Jason Kenny	Great Britain		Callum Skinner	Great Britain	Denis Dmitriev	Russia	
Diving	Women's 3 m springboard	Shi Tingmao	China		He Zi	China	Tania Cagnotto	Italy	
Fencing	Men's team épée	Gauthier Grumier; Yannick Borel; Daniel Jérent; Jean-Michel Lucenay	France		Enrico Garozzo; Marco Fichera; Paolo Pizzo; Andrea Santarelli	Italy	Gábor Boczkó; Géza Imre; András Rédli; Péter Somfai	Hungary	
Golf	Men's	Justin Rose	Great Britain		Henrik Stenson	Sweden	Matt Kuchar	United States	
Gymnastics	Men's floor	Max Whitlock	Great Britain		Diego Hypólito	Brazil	Arthur Mariano	Brazil	
Gymnastics	Men's pommel horse	Max Whitlock	Great Britain		Louis Smith	Great Britain	Alexander Naddour	United States	
Gymnastics	Women's vault	Simone Biles	United States		Maria Paseka	Russia	Giulia Steingruber	Switzerland	
Gymnastics	Women's uneven bars	Aliya Mustafina	Russia		Madison Kocian	United States	Sophie Scheder	Germany	
Sailing	Men's RS:X	Dorian van Rijsselberghe	Netherlands		Nick Dempsey	Great Britain	Pierre Le Coq	France	
Sailing	Women's RS:X	Charline Picon	France		Chen Peina	China	Stefania Elfutina	Russia	
Shooting	Men's 50 m rifle three positions	Niccolò Campriani	Italy		Sergey Kamenskiy	Russia	Alexis Raynaud	France	
Tennis	Men's singles	Andy Murray	Great Britain		Juan Martín del Potro	Argentina	Kei Nishikori	Japan	
Tennis	Women's doubles	Ekaterina Makarova; Elena Vesnina	Russia		Timea Bacsinszky; Martina Hingis	Switzerland	Lucie Šafářová †; Barbora Strýcová †	Czech Republic	
Tennis	Mixed doubles	Bethanie Mattek-Sands; Jack Sock	United States		Venus Williams; Rajeev Ram	United States	Lucie Hradecká; Radek Štěpánek	Czech Republic	
Weightlifting	Women's +75 kg	Meng Suping	China		Kim Kuk-hyang	North Korea	Sarah Robles	United States	
Wrestling	Men's Greco-Roman 59 kg	Ismael Borrero	Cuba		Shinobu Ota	Japan	Elmurat Tasmuradov	Uzbekistan	
Wrestling	Men's Greco-Roman 59 kg	Ismael Borrero	Cuba		Shinobu Ota	Japan	Stig André Berge	Norway	
Wrestling	Men's Greco-Roman 75 kg	Roman Vlasov	Russia		Mark Madsen	Denmark	Kim Hyeon-woo	South Korea	
Wrestling	Men's Greco-Roman 75 kg	Roman Vlasov	Russia		Mark Madsen	Denmark	Saeid Abdevali	Iran	

=== Day 10: 15 August ===
Sport	Event	Gold medalist(s)			Silver medalist(s)		Bronze medalist(s)		Ref
Sport	Event	Competitor(s)	NOC	Rec	Competitor(s)	NOC	Competitor(s)	NOC	Ref
Athletics	Men's 800 m	David Rudisha	Kenya		Taoufik Makhloufi	Algeria	Clayton Murphy	United States	
Athletics	Men's pole vault	Thiago Braz da Silva	Brazil	OR	Renaud Lavillenie	France	Sam Kendricks	United States	
Athletics	Women's 400 m	Shaunae Miller	Bahamas		Allyson Felix	United States	Shericka Jackson	Jamaica	
Athletics	Women's 3000 m steeplechase	Ruth Jebet	Bahrain		Hyvin Jepkemoi	Kenya	Emma Coburn	United States	
Athletics	Women's hammer throw	Anita Włodarczyk	Poland	WR	Zhang Wenxiu	China	Sophie Hitchon	Great Britain	
Boxing	Men's heavyweight	Evgeny Tishchenko	Russia		Vassiliy Levit	Kazakhstan	Rustam Tulaganov †	Uzbekistan	
Boxing	Men's heavyweight	Evgeny Tishchenko	Russia		Vassiliy Levit	Kazakhstan	Erislandy Savón †	Cuba	
Cycling	Men's Omnium	Elia Viviani	Italy		Mark Cavendish	Great Britain	Lasse Norman Hansen	Denmark	
Equestrian	Individual dressage	Charlotte Dujardin	Great Britain		Isabell Werth	Germany	Kristina Bröring-Sprehe	Germany	
Gymnastics	Men's vault	Ri Se-gwang	North Korea		Denis Ablyazin	Russia	Kenzō Shirai	Japan	
Gymnastics	Men's rings	Eleftherios Petrounias	Greece		Arthur Zanetti	Brazil	Denis Ablyazin	Russia	
Gymnastics	Women's balance beam	Sanne Wevers	Netherlands		Laurie Hernandez	United States	Simone Biles	United States	
Sailing	Laser	Postponed and rescheduled							
Sailing	Laser Radial	Postponed and rescheduled							
Swimming	Women's marathon 10 km	Sharon van Rouwendaal	Netherlands		Rachele Bruni	Italy	Poliana Okimoto	Brazil	
Weightlifting	Men's 105 kg	Ruslan Nurudinov	Uzbekistan	OR	Simon Martirosyan	Armenia	Aleksandr Zaychikov	Kazakhstan	
Wrestling	Men's Greco-Roman 85 kg	Davit Chakvetadze	Russia		Zhan Beleniuk	Ukraine	Javid Hamzatau	Belarus	
Wrestling	Men's Greco-Roman 85 kg	Davit Chakvetadze	Russia		Zhan Beleniuk	Ukraine	Denis Kudla	Germany	
Wrestling	Men's Greco-Roman 130 kg	Mijaín López	Cuba		Rıza Kayaalp	Turkey	Sabah Shariati	Azerbaijan	
Wrestling	Men's Greco-Roman 130 kg	Mijaín López	Cuba		Rıza Kayaalp	Turkey	Sergey Semenov	Russia	

=== Day 11: 16 August ===
Sport	Event	Gold medalist(s)			Silver medalist(s)		Bronze medalist(s)		Ref
Sport	Event	Competitor(s)	NOC	Rec	Competitor(s)	NOC	Competitor(s)	NOC	Ref
Athletics	Men's 110 m hurdles	Omar McLeod	Jamaica		Orlando Ortega	Spain	Dimitri Bascou	France	
Athletics	Men's triple jump	Christian Taylor	United States		Will Claye	United States	Dong Bin	China	
Athletics	Men's high jump	Derek Drouin	Canada		Mutaz Essa Barshim	Qatar	Bohdan Bondarenko	Ukraine	
Athletics	Women's 1500 m	Faith Kipyegon	Kenya		Genzebe Dibaba	Ethiopia	Jennifer Simpson	United States	
Athletics	Women's discus throw	Sandra Perković	Croatia		Mélina Robert-Michon	France	Denia Caballero	Cuba	
Boxing	Men's lightweight	Robson Conceição	Brazil		Sofiane Oumiha	France	Lázaro Álvarez †	Cuba	
Boxing	Men's lightweight	Robson Conceição	Brazil		Sofiane Oumiha	France	Dorjnyambuugiin Otgondalai †	Mongolia	
Canoeing	Men's C-1 1000 m	Sebastian Brendel	Germany		Isaquias Queiroz	Brazil	Ilia Shtokalov	Russia	
Canoeing	Men's K-1 1000 m	Marcus Walz	Spain		Josef Dostál	Czech Republic	Roman Anoshkin	Russia	
Canoeing	Women's K-1 200 m	Lisa Carrington	New Zealand		Marta Walczykiewicz	Poland	Inna Osypenko-Radomska	Azerbaijan	
Canoeing	Women's K-2 500 m	Danuta Kozák; Gabriella Szabó	Hungary		Franziska Weber; Tina Dietze	Germany	Karolina Naja; Beata Mikołajczyk	Poland	
Cycling	Men's Keirin	Jason Kenny	Great Britain		Matthijs Büchli	Netherlands	Azizulhasni Awang	Malaysia	
Cycling	Women's Omnium	Laura Trott	Great Britain		Sarah Hammer	United States	Jolien D'Hoore	Belgium	
Cycling	Women's sprint	Kristina Vogel	Germany		Becky James	Great Britain	Katy Marchant	Great Britain	
Diving	Men's 3 m springboard	Cao Yuan	China		Jack Laugher	Great Britain	Patrick Hausding	Germany	
Gymnastics	Men's parallel bars	Oleg Verniaiev	Ukraine		Danell Leyva	United States	David Belyavskiy	Russia	
Gymnastics	Men's horizontal bar	Fabian Hambüchen	Germany		Danell Leyva	United States	Nile Wilson	Great Britain	
Gymnastics	Women's floor	Simone Biles	United States		Aly Raisman	United States	Amy Tinkler	Great Britain	
Sailing	Finn	Giles Scott	Great Britain		Vasilij Žbogar	Slovenia	Caleb Paine	United States	
Sailing	Laser	Tom Burton	Australia		Tonči Stipanović	Croatia	Sam Meech	New Zealand	
Sailing	Laser Radial	Marit Bouwmeester	Netherlands		Annalise Murphy	Ireland	Anne-Marie Rindom	Denmark	
Sailing	Nacra 17	Cecilia Carranza; Santiago Lange	Argentina		Lisa Darmanin; Jason Waterhouse	Australia	Tanja Frank; Thomas Zajac	Austria	
Swimming	Men's marathon 10 km	Ferry Weertman	Netherlands		Spyridon Gianniotis	Greece	Marc-Antoine Olivier	France	
Synchronized swimming	Duet	Natalia Ishchenko; Svetlana Romashina	Russia		Huang Xuechen; Sun Wenyan	China	Yukiko Inui; Risako Mitsui	Japan	
Table tennis	Women's team	Ding Ning; Liu Shiwen; Li Xiaoxia	China		Han Ying; Petrissa Solja; Shan Xiaona	Germany	Ai Fukuhara; Kasumi Ishikawa; Mima Ito	Japan	
Weightlifting	Men's +105 kg	Lasha Talakhadze	Georgia	WR	Gor Minasyan	Armenia	Irakli Turmanidze	Georgia	
Wrestling	Men's Greco-Roman 66 kg	Davor Štefanek	Serbia		Migran Arutyunyan	Armenia	Shmagi Bolkvadze	Georgia	
Wrestling	Men's Greco-Roman 66 kg	Davor Štefanek	Serbia		Migran Arutyunyan	Armenia	Rasul Chunayev	Azerbaijan	
Wrestling	Men's Greco-Roman 98 kg	Artur Aleksanyan	Armenia		Yasmany Lugo	Cuba	Cenk İldem	Turkey	
Wrestling	Men's Greco-Roman 98 kg	Artur Aleksanyan	Armenia		Yasmany Lugo	Cuba	Ghasem Rezaei	Iran	

=== Day 12: 17 August ===
Sport	Event	Gold medalist(s)			Silver medalist(s)		Bronze medalist(s)		Ref
Sport	Event	Competitor(s)	NOC	Rec	Competitor(s)	NOC	Competitor(s)	NOC	Ref
Athletics	Men's 3000 m steeplechase	Conseslus Kipruto	Kenya	OR	Evan Jager	United States	Mahiedine Mekhissi-Benabbad	France	
Athletics	Women's 200 m	Elaine Thompson	Jamaica		Dafne Schippers	Netherlands	Tori Bowie	United States	
Athletics	Women's 100 m hurdles	Brianna Rollins	United States		Nia Ali	United States	Kristi Castlin	United States	
Athletics	Women's long jump	Tianna Bartoletta	United States		Brittney Reese	United States	Ivana Španović	Serbia	
Badminton	Mixed doubles	Tontowi Ahmad; Liliyana Natsir	Indonesia		Chan Peng Soon; Goh Liu Ying	Malaysia	Zhang Nan †; Zhao Yunlei †	China	
Boxing	Men's welterweight	Daniyar Yeleussinov	Kazakhstan		Shakhram Giyasov	Uzbekistan	Mohammed Rabii †	Morocco	
Boxing	Men's welterweight	Daniyar Yeleussinov	Kazakhstan		Shakhram Giyasov	Uzbekistan	Souleymane Cissokho †	France	
Equestrian	Team jumping	Roger-Yves Bost; Pénélope Leprevost; Philippe Rozier; Kevin Staut	France		Kent Farrington; Lucy Davis; McLain Ward; Elizabeth Madden	United States	Daniel Deusser; Meredith Michaels-Beerbaum; Ludger Beerbaum; Christian Ahlmann	Germany	
Sailing	Men's 470	Postponed and rescheduled							
Sailing	Women's 470	Postponed and rescheduled							
Table tennis	Men's team	Ma Long; Zhang Jike; Xu Xin	China		Koki Niwa; Jun Mizutani; Maharu Yoshimura	Japan	Timo Boll; Dimitrij Ovtcharov; Bastian Steger	Germany	
Taekwondo	Men's 58 kg	Zhao Shuai	China		Tawin Hanprab	Thailand	Luisito Pié	Dominican Republic	
Taekwondo	Men's 58 kg	Zhao Shuai	China		Tawin Hanprab	Thailand	Kim Tae-hun	South Korea	
Taekwondo	Women's 49 kg	Kim So-hui	South Korea		Tijana Bogdanović	Serbia	Patimat Abakarova	Azerbaijan	
Taekwondo	Women's 49 kg	Kim So-hui	South Korea		Tijana Bogdanović	Serbia	Panipak Wongpattanakit	Thailand	
Volleyball	Women's beach	Laura Ludwig; Kira Walkenhorst	Germany		Ágatha Bednarczuk; Bárbara Seixas	Brazil	April Ross; Kerri Walsh Jennings	United States	
Wrestling	Women's freestyle 48 kg	Eri Tosaka	Japan		Mariya Stadnik	Azerbaijan	Sun Yanan	China	
Wrestling	Women's freestyle 48 kg	Eri Tosaka	Japan		Mariya Stadnik	Azerbaijan	Elitsa Yankova	Bulgaria	
Wrestling	Women's freestyle 58 kg	Kaori Icho	Japan		Valeria Koblova	Russia	Marwa Amri	Tunisia	
Wrestling	Women's freestyle 58 kg	Kaori Icho	Japan		Valeria Koblova	Russia	Sakshi Malik	India	
Wrestling	Women's freestyle 69 kg	Sara Dosho	Japan		Nataliya Vorobyova	Russia	Elmira Syzdykova	Kazakhstan	
Wrestling	Women's freestyle 69 kg	Sara Dosho	Japan		Nataliya Vorobyova	Russia	Jenny Fransson	Sweden	

=== Day 13: 18 August ===
Sport	Event	Gold medalist(s)			Silver medalist(s)		Bronze medalist(s)		Ref
Sport	Event	Competitor(s)	NOC	Rec	Competitor(s)	NOC	Competitor(s)	NOC	Ref
Athletics	Men's 200 m	Usain Bolt	Jamaica		Andre De Grasse	Canada	Christophe Lemaitre	France	
Athletics	Men's 400 m hurdles	Kerron Clement	United States		Boniface Mucheru Tumuti	Kenya	Yasmani Copello	Turkey	
Athletics	Men's shot put	Ryan Crouser	United States	OR	Joe Kovacs	United States	Tomas Walsh	New Zealand	
Athletics	Men's decathlon	Ashton Eaton	United States	OR	Kévin Mayer	France	Damian Warner	Canada	
Athletics	Women's 400 m hurdles	Dalilah Muhammad	United States		Sara Petersen	Denmark	Ashley Spencer	United States	
Athletics	Women's javelin throw	Sara Kolak	Croatia		Sunette Viljoen	South Africa	Barbora Špotáková	Czech Republic	
Badminton	Women's doubles	Misaki Matsutomo; Ayaka Takahashi	Japan		Christinna Pedersen; Kamilla Rytter Juhl	Denmark	Jung Kyung-eun; Shin Seung-chan	South Korea	
Boxing	Men's light heavyweight	Julio César La Cruz	Cuba		Adilbek Niyazymbetov	Kazakhstan	Mathieu Bauderlique †	France	
Boxing	Men's light heavyweight	Julio César La Cruz	Cuba		Adilbek Niyazymbetov	Kazakhstan	Joshua Buatsi †	Great Britain	
Canoeing	Men's C-1 200 m	Yuriy Cheban	Ukraine	OR	Valentin Demyanenko	Azerbaijan	Isaquias Queiroz	Brazil	
Canoeing	Men's K-2 200 m	Saúl Craviotto; Cristian Toro	Spain		Liam Heath; Jon Schofield	Great Britain	Aurimas Lankas; Edvinas Ramanauskas	Lithuania	
Canoeing	Men's K-2 1000 m	Marcus Gross; Max Rendschmidt	Germany		Marko Tomićević; Milenko Zorić	Serbia	Ken Wallace; Lachlan Tame	Australia	
Canoeing	Women's K-1 500 m	Danuta Kozak	Hungary		Emma Jørgensen	Denmark	Lisa Carrington	New Zealand	
Diving	Women's 10 m platform	Ren Qian	China		Si Yajie	China	Meaghan Benfeito	Canada	
Field hockey	Men's	Manuel Brunet; Facundo Callioni; Juan Gilardi; Isidoro Ibarra; Pedro Ibarra; Juan López; Luca Masso; Agustín Mazzilli; Joaquín Menini; Ignacio Ortíz; Gonzalo Peillat; Lucas Rey; Lucas Rossi; Juan Saladino; Lucas Vila; Juan Vivaldi	Argentina		Arthur Van Doren; John-John Dohmen; Florent Van Aubel; Sébastien Dockier; Cédric Charlier; Gauthier Boccard; Emmanuel Stockbroekx; Thomas Briels; Félix Denayer; Vincent Vanasch; Simon Gougnard; Loïck Luypaert; Tom Boon; Jérôme Truyens; Elliot Van Strydonck; Tanguy Cosyns	Belgium	Nicolas Jacobi; Mathias Müller; Linus Butt; Martin Häner; Moritz Trompertz; Mats Grambusch; Christopher Wesley; Timm Herzbruch; Tobias Hauke; Tom Grambusch; Christopher Rühr; Martin Zwicker; Moritz Fürste; Florian Fuchs; Timur Oruz; Niklas Wellen	Germany	
Sailing	Men's 470	Sime Fantela; Igor Marenic	Croatia		Mathew Belcher; William Ryan	Australia	Panagiotis Mantis; Pavlos Kagialis	Greece	
Sailing	Women's 470	Hannah Mills; Saskia Clark	Great Britain		Jo Aleh; Polly Powrie	New Zealand	Camille Lecointre; Hélène Defrance	France	
Sailing	49er	Peter Burling; Blair Tuke	New Zealand		Nathan Outteridge; Iain Jensen	Australia	Erik Heil; Thomas Plößel	Germany	
Sailing	49erFX	Martine Grael; Kahena Kunze	Brazil		Alex Maloney; Molly Meech	New Zealand	Jena Mai Hansen; Katja Salskov-Iversen	Denmark	
Taekwondo	Men's 68 kg	Ahmad Abughaush	Jordan		Alexey Denisenko	Russia	Lee Dae-hoon	South Korea	
Taekwondo	Men's 68 kg	Ahmad Abughaush	Jordan		Alexey Denisenko	Russia	Joel González	Spain	
Taekwondo	Women's 57 kg	Jade Jones	Great Britain		Eva Calvo	Spain	Hedaya Malak	Egypt	
Taekwondo	Women's 57 kg	Jade Jones	Great Britain		Eva Calvo	Spain	Kimia Alizadeh	Iran	
Triathlon	Men's triathlon	Alistair Brownlee	Great Britain		Jonathan Brownlee	Great Britain	Henri Schoeman	South Africa	
Volleyball	Men's beach	Alison Cerutti; Bruno Oscar Schmidt	Brazil		Paolo Nicolai; Daniele Lupo	Italy	Alexander Brouwer; Robert Meeuwsen	Netherlands	
Wrestling	Women's freestyle 53 kg	Helen Maroulis	United States		Saori Yoshida	Japan	Nataliya Synyshyn	Azerbaijan	
Wrestling	Women's freestyle 53 kg	Helen Maroulis	United States		Saori Yoshida	Japan	Sofia Mattsson	Sweden	
Wrestling	Women's freestyle 63 kg	Risako Kawai	Japan		Maryia Mamashuk	Belarus	Yekaterina Larionova	Kazakhstan	
Wrestling	Women's freestyle 63 kg	Risako Kawai	Japan		Maryia Mamashuk	Belarus	Monika Michalik	Poland	
Wrestling	Women's freestyle 75 kg	Erica Wiebe	Canada		Guzel Manyurova	Kazakhstan	Zhang Fengliu	China	
Wrestling	Women's freestyle 75 kg	Erica Wiebe	Canada		Guzel Manyurova	Kazakhstan	Ekaterina Bukina	Russia	

=== Day 14: 19 August ===
Sport	Event	Gold medalist(s)			Silver medalist(s)		Bronze medalist(s)		Ref
Sport	Event	Competitor(s)	NOC	Rec	Competitor(s)	NOC	Competitor(s)	NOC	Ref
Athletics	Men's 4 × 100 m relay	Asafa Powell; Yohan Blake; Nickel Ashmeade; Usain Bolt; Jevaughn Minzie*; Kemar Bailey-Cole*	Jamaica		Ryota Yamagata; Shota Iizuka; Yoshihide Kiryu; Aska Cambridge	Japan	Akeem Haynes; Aaron Brown; Brendon Rodney; Andre De Grasse; Mobolade Ajomale*	Canada	
Athletics	Men's 50 km walk	Matej Toth	Slovakia		Jared Tallent	Australia	Hirooki Arai	Japan	
Athletics	Men's hammer throw	Dilshod Nazarov	Tajikistan		Ivan Tsikhan	Belarus	Wojciech Nowicki	Poland	
Athletics	Women's 5000 m	Vivian Cheruiyot	Kenya	OR	Hellen Onsando Obiri	Kenya	Almaz Ayana	Ethiopia	
Athletics	Women's 4 × 100 m relay	Tianna Bartoletta; Allyson Felix; English Gardner; Tori Bowie; Morolake Akinosun*	United States		Christania Williams; Elaine Thompson; Veronica Campbell-Brown; Shelly-Ann Fraser; Simone Facey*; Sashalee Forbes*	Jamaica	Asha Philip; Desirèe Henry; Dina Asher-Smith; Daryll Neita	Great Britain	
Athletics	Women's 20 km walk	Liu Hong	China		Maria Guadalupe Gonzalez	Mexico	Lü Xiuzhi	China	
Athletics	Women's pole vault	Ekaterini Stefanidi	Greece		Sandi Morris	United States	Eliza McCartney	New Zealand	
Badminton	Men's doubles	Fu Haifeng; Zhang Nan	China		Goh V Shem; Tan Wee Kiong	Malaysia	Marcus Ellis; Chris Langridge†	Great Britain	
Badminton	Women's singles	Carolina Marín	Spain		P. V. Sindhu	India	Nozomi Okuhara	Japan	
Boxing	Women's lightweight	Estelle Mossely	France		Yin Junhua	China	Mira Potkonen †	Finland	
Boxing	Women's lightweight	Estelle Mossely	France		Yin Junhua	China	Anastasia Belyakova †	Russia	
Cycling	Men's BMX	Connor Fields	United States		Jelle van Gorkom	Netherlands	Carlos Ramírez	Colombia	
Cycling	Women's BMX	Mariana Pajón	Colombia		Alise Post	United States	Stefany Hernández	Venezuela	
Equestrian	Individual jumping	Nick Skelton	Great Britain		Peder Fredricson	Sweden	Eric Lamaze	Canada	
Field hockey	Women's	Maddie Hinch; Laura Unsworth; Crista Cullen; Hannah Macleod; Georgie Twigg; Helen Richardson-Walsh; Susannah Townsend; Kate Richardson-Walsh; Sam Quek; Alex Danson; Giselle Ansley; Sophie Bray; Hollie Webb; Shona McCallin; Lily Owsley; Nicola White	Great Britain		Joyce Sombroek; Xan de Waard; Kitty van Male; Laurien Leurink; Willemijn Bos; Marloes Keetels; Carlien Dirkse van den Heuvel; Kelly Jonker; Maria Verschoor; Lidewij Welten; Caia van Maasakker; Maartje Paumen; Naomi van As; Ellen Hoog; Margot van Geffen; Eva de Goede	Netherlands	Nike Lorenz; Selin Oruz; Anne Schröder; Lisa Schütze; Charlotte Stapenhorst; Janne Müller-Wieland; Hannah Krüger; Jana Teschke; Lisa Altenburg; Franzisca Hauke; Cécile Pieper; Marie Mävers; Annika Sprink; Julia Müller; Pia-Sophie Oldhafer; Kristina Reynolds; Katharina Otte	Germany	
Football	Women's	Almuth Schult; Josephine Henning; Saskia Bartusiak; Leonie Maier; Annike Krahn; Simone Laudehr; Melanie Behringer; Lena Goeßling; Alexandra Popp; Dzsenifer Marozsán; Anja Mittag; Tabea Kemme; Sara Däbritz; Babett Peter; Mandy Islacker; Melanie Leupolz; Isabel Kerschowski; Laura Benkarth; Svenja Huth	Germany		Hedvig Lindahl; Jonna Andersson; Linda Sembrant; Emma Berglund; Nilla Fischer; Magdalena Ericsson; Lisa Dahlkvist; Lotta Schelin; Kosovare Asllani; Sofia Jakobsson; Stina Blackstenius; Olivia Schough; Fridolina Rolfö; Emilia Appelqvist; Jessica Samuelsson; Elin Rubensson; Caroline Seger; Hilda Carlén; Pauline Hammarlund	Sweden	Stephanie Labbé; Allysha Chapman; Kadeisha Buchanan; Shelina Zadorsky; Quinn (Note: Then known as Rebecca Quinn); Deanne Rose; Rhian Wilkinson; Diana Matheson; Josée Bélanger; Ashley Lawrence; Desiree Scott; Christine Sinclair; Sophie Schmidt; Melissa Tancredi; Nichelle Prince; Janine Beckie; Jessie Fleming; Sabrina D'Angelo	Canada	
Modern pentathlon	Women's	Chloe Esposito	Australia	OR	Élodie Clouvel	France	Oktawia Nowacka	Poland	
Synchronized swimming	Women's team	Vlada Chigireva; Natalia Ishchenko; Svetlana Kolesnichenko; Aleksandra Patskevich; Elena Prokofyeva; Svetlana Romashina; Alla Shishkina; Maria Shurochkina; Gelena Topilina	Russia		Huang Xuechen; Sun Wenyan; Guo Li; Gu Xiao; Tang Mengni; Li Xiaolu; Zeng Zhen; Liang Xinping; Yin Chengxin	China	Aika Hakoyama; Yukiko Inui; Kei Marumo; Risako Mitsui; Kanami Nakamaki; Mai Nakamura; Omata Kano; Yoshida Kurumi; Aiko Hayashi	Japan	
Taekwondo	Men's 80 kg	Cheick Sallah Cisse	Ivory Coast		Lutalo Muhammad	Great Britain	Oussama Oueslati	Tunisia	
Taekwondo	Men's 80 kg	Cheick Sallah Cisse	Ivory Coast		Lutalo Muhammad	Great Britain	Milad Beigi	Azerbaijan	
Taekwondo	Women's 67 kg	Oh Hye-ri	South Korea		Haby Niaré	France	Ruth Gbagbi	Ivory Coast	
Taekwondo	Women's 67 kg	Oh Hye-ri	South Korea		Haby Niaré	France	Nur Tatar	Turkey	
Water polo	Women's	Samantha Hill; Madeline Musselmann; Melissa Seidemann; Rachel Fattal; Aria Fischer; Maggie Steffens; Courtney Mathewson; Kiley Neushul; Caroline Clark; Kaleigh Gilchrist; Makenzie Fischer; Kami Craig; Ashleigh Johnson	United States		Giulia Gorlero; Chiara Tabani; Arianna Garibotti; Elisa Queirolo; Federica Radicchi; Rosaria Aiello; Tania Di Mario; Roberta Bianconi; Giulia Enrica Emmolo; Francesca Pomeri; Aleksandra Cotti; Teresa Frassinetti; Laura Teani	Italy	Anna Ustyukhina; Maria Borisova; Ekaterina Prokofyeva; Elvina Karimova; Nadezhda Fedotova; Olga Belova; Ekaterina Lisunova; Anastasia Simanovich; Anna Timofeeva; Evgenia Soboleva; Evgeniya Ivanova; Anna Grineva; Anna Karnaukh	Russia	
Wrestling	Men's freestyle 57 kg	Vladimer Khinchegashvili	Georgia		Rei Higuchi	Japan	Haji Aliyev	Azerbaijan	
Wrestling	Men's freestyle 57 kg	Vladimer Khinchegashvili	Georgia		Rei Higuchi	Japan	Hassan Rahimi	Iran	
Wrestling	Men's freestyle 74 kg	Hassan Yazdani	Iran		Aniuar Geduev	Russia	Jabrayil Hasanov	Azerbaijan	
Wrestling	Men's freestyle 74 kg	Hassan Yazdani	Iran		Aniuar Geduev	Russia	Soner Demirtaş	Turkey	

=== Day 15: 20 August ===
Sport	Event	Gold medalist(s)			Silver medalist(s)		Bronze medalist(s)		Ref
Sport	Event	Competitor(s)	NOC	Rec	Competitor(s)	NOC	Competitor(s)	NOC	Ref
Athletics	Men's 1500 m	Matthew Centrowitz	United States		Taoufik Makhloufi	Algeria	Nicholas Willis	New Zealand	
Athletics	Men's 5000 m	Mo Farah	Great Britain		Paul Kipkemoi Chelimo	United States	Hagos Gebrhiwet	Ethiopia	
Athletics	Men's 4 × 400 m relay	Arman Hall; Tony McQuay; Gil Roberts; LaShawn Merritt; David Verburg*	United States		Peter Matthews; Nathon Allen; Fitzroy Dunkley; Javon Francis; Rusheen McDonald*	Jamaica	Alonzo Russell; Michael Mathieu; Steven Gardiner; Chris Brown; Stephen Newbold*	Bahamas	
Athletics	Men's javelin throw	Thomas Röhler	Germany		Julius Yego	Kenya	Keshorn Walcott	Trinidad and Tobago	
Athletics	Women's 800 m	Caster Semenya	South Africa		Francine Niyonsaba	Burundi	Margaret Wambui	Kenya	
Athletics	Women's 4 × 400 m relay	Allyson Felix; Phyllis Francis; Natasha Hastings; Courtney Okolo; Taylor Ellis-Watson*; Francena McCorory*	United States		Stephenie Ann McPherson; Anneisha McLaughlin-Whilby; Shericka Jackson; Novlene Williams-Mills; Christine Day*; Chrisann Gordon*	Jamaica	Eilidh Doyle; Emily Diamond; Anyika Onuora; Christine Ohuruogu; Kelly Massey*	Great Britain	
Athletics	Women's high jump	Ruth Beitia	Spain		Mirela Demireva	Bulgaria	Blanka Vlašić	Croatia	
Badminton	Men's singles	Chen Long	China		Lee Chong Wei	Malaysia	Viktor Axelsen	Denmark	
Basketball	Women's	Seimone Augustus; Sue Bird; Tamika Catchings; Tina Charles; Elena Delle Donne; Sylvia Fowles; Brittney Griner; Angel McCoughtry; Maya Moore; Breanna Stewart; Diana Taurasi; Lindsay Whalen	United States		Leticia Romero; Laura Nicholls; Silvia Domínguez; Alba Torrens; Laia Palau; Marta Xargay; Leonor Rodríguez; Lucila Pascua; Anna Cruz; Laura Quevedo; Laura Gil; Astou Ndour	Spain	Tamara Radočaj; Sonja Petrović; Saša Čađo; Sara Krnjić; Nevena Jovanović; Jelena Milovanović; Dajana Butulija; Dragana Stanković; Aleksandra Crvendakić; Milica Dabović; Ana Dabović; Danielle Page	Serbia	
Boxing	Men's bantamweight	Robeisy Ramírez	Cuba		Shakur Stevenson	United States	Vladimir Nikitin †	Russia	
Boxing	Men's bantamweight	Robeisy Ramírez	Cuba		Shakur Stevenson	United States	Murodjon Akhmadaliev †	Uzbekistan	
Boxing	Men's middleweight	Arlen López	Cuba		Bektemir Melikuziev	Uzbekistan	Kamran Shakhsuvarly †	Azerbaijan	
Boxing	Men's middleweight	Arlen López	Cuba		Bektemir Melikuziev	Uzbekistan	Misael Rodríguez †	Mexico	
Boxing	Women's flyweight	Nicola Adams	Great Britain		Sarah Ourahmoune	France	Ren Cancan †	China	
Boxing	Women's flyweight	Nicola Adams	Great Britain		Sarah Ourahmoune	France	Ingrit Valencia †	Colombia	
Canoeing	Men's C-2 1000 m	Sebastian Brendel; Jan Vandrey	Germany		Erlon Silva; Isaquias Queiroz	Brazil	Dmytro Ianchuk; Taras Mishchuk	Ukraine	
Canoeing	Men's K-1 200 m	Liam Heath	Great Britain		Maxime Beaumont	France	Saúl Craviotto	Spain	
Canoeing	Men's K-1 200 m	Liam Heath	Great Britain		Maxime Beaumont	France	Ronald Rauhe	Germany	
Canoeing	Men's K-4 1000 m	Marcus Gross; Max Hoff; Tom Liebscher; Max Rendschmidt	Germany		Denis Myšák; Erik Vlček; Juraj Tarr; Tibor Linka	Slovakia	Daniel Havel; Lukáš Trefil; Josef Dostál; Jan Štěrba	Czech Republic	
Canoeing	Women's K-4 500 m	Gabriella Szabó; Danuta Kozák; Tamara Csipes; Krisztina Fazekas	Hungary		Sabrina Hering; Franziska Weber; Steffi Kriegerstein; Tina Dietze	Germany	Marharyta Makhneva; Nadzeya Liapeshka; Volha Khudzenka; Maryna Litvinchuk	Belarus	
Cycling	Women's cross-country	Jenny Rissveds	Sweden		Maja Włoszczowska	Poland	Catharine Pendrel	Canada	
Diving	Men's 10 m platform	Chen Aysén	China		Germán Sánchez	Mexico	David Boudia	United States	
Football	Men's	Weverton; Zeca; Rodrigo Caio; Marquinhos; Renato Augusto; Douglas Santos; Luan; Rafinha; Gabriel; Neymar; Gabriel Jesus; Walace; William; Luan Garcia; Rodrigo Dourado; Thiago Maia; Felipe Anderson; Uilson	Brazil		Timo Horn; Jeremy Toljan; Lukas Klostermann; Matthias Ginter; Niklas Süle; Sven Bender; Max Meyer; Lars Bender; Davie Selke; Leon Goretzka; Julian Brandt; Jannik Huth; Philipp Max; Robert Bauer; Max Christiansen; Grischa Prömel; Serge Gnabry; Nils Petersen; Eric Oelschlägel	Germany	Daniel Akpeyi; Muenfuh Sincere; Kingsley Madu; Shehu Abdullahi; Saturday Erimuya; William Troost-Ekong; Aminu Umar; Oghenekaro Etebo; Imoh Ezekiel; John Obi Mikel; Junior Ajayi; Popoola Saliu; Umar Sadiq; Azubuike Okechukwu; Ndifreke Udo; Stanley Amuzie; Usman Mohammed; Emmanuel Daniel	Nigeria	
Golf	Women's	Inbee Park	South Korea		Lydia Ko	New Zealand	Shanshan Feng	China	
Gymnastics	Women's rhythmic individual all-around	Margarita Mamun	Russia		Yana Kudryavtseva	Russia	Ganna Rizatdinova	Ukraine	
Handball	Women's	Anna Sedoykina; Polina Kuznetsova; Daria Dmitrieva; Anna Sen; Olga Akopyan; Anna Vyakhireva; Marina Sudakova; Vladlena Bobrovnikova; Victoria Zhilinskayte; Yekaterina Marennikova; Irina Bliznova; Ekaterina Ilina; Maya Petrova; Tatyana Yerokhina; Victoriya Kalinina	Russia		Laura Glauser; Blandine Dancette; Camille Ayglon; Allison Pineau; Laurisa Landre; Grâce Zaadi; Amandine Leynaud; Manon Houette; Siraba Dembélé; Chloé Bulleux; Béatrice Edwige; Estelle Nze Minko; Gnonsiane Niombla; Alexandra Lacrabère	France	Kari Aalvik Grimsbø; Mari Molid; Emilie Hegh Arntzen; Ida Alstad; Veronica Kristiansen; Heidi Løke; Nora Mørk; Stine Bredal Oftedal; Marit Malm Frafjord; Katrine Lunde; Linn-Kristin Riegelhuth Koren; Amanda Kurtović; Camilla Herrem; Sanna Solberg	Norway	
Modern pentathlon	Men's	Aleksander Lesun	Russia		Pavlo Tymoshchenko	Ukraine	Ismael Hernández	Mexico	
Taekwondo	Men's +80 kg	Radik Isayev	Azerbaijan		Abdoul Issoufou	Niger	Maicon Siqueira	Brazil	
Taekwondo	Men's +80 kg	Radik Isayev	Azerbaijan		Abdoul Issoufou	Niger	Cha Dong-min	South Korea	
Taekwondo	Women's +67 kg	Zheng Shuyin	China		María Espinoza	Mexico	Bianca Walkden	Great Britain	
Taekwondo	Women's +67 kg	Zheng Shuyin	China		María Espinoza	Mexico	Jackie Galloway	United States	
Triathlon	Women's triathlon	Gwen Jorgensen	United States		Nicola Spirig	Switzerland	Vicky Holland	Great Britain	
Volleyball	Women's indoor	Ding Xia; Gong Xiangyu; Hui Ruoqi; Lin Li; Liu Xiaotong; Wei Qiuyue; Xu Yunli; Yan Ni; Yang Fangxu; Yuan Xinyue; Zhang Changning; Zhu Ting	China		Tijana Bošković; Jovana Brakočević; Bianka Buša; Tijana Malešević; Brankica Mihajlović; Jelena Nikolić; Maja Ognjenović; Silvija Popović; Milena Rašić; Jovana Stevanović; Stefana Veljković; Bojana Živković	Serbia	Rachael Adams; Foluke Akinradewo; Kayla Banwarth; Alisha Glass; Christa Harmotto; Kimberly Hill; Jordan Larson; Carli Lloyd; Karsta Lowe; Kelly Murphy; Kelsey Robinson; Courtney Thompson	United States	
Water polo	Men's	Gojko Pijetlović; Dušan Mandić; Živko Gocić; Sava Ranđelović; Miloš Ćuk; Duško Pijetlović; Slobodan Nikić; Milan Aleksić; Nikola Jakšić; Filip Filipović; Andrija Prlainović; Stefan Mitrović; Branislav Mitrović	Serbia		Josip Pavić; Damir Burić; Antonio Petković; Luka Lončar; Maro Joković; Luka Bukić; Xavier García; Andro Bušlje; Sandro Sukno; Ivan Krapić; Anđelo Šetka; Marko Macan; Marko Bijač	Croatia	Stefano Tempesti; Francesco Di Fulvio; Niccolò Gitto; Pietro Figlioli; Alessandro Velotto; Michael Bodegas; Andrea Fondelli; Valentino Gallo; Christian Presciutti; Nicholas Presciutti; Matteo Aicardi; Alessandro Nora; Marco Del Lungo	Italy	
Wrestling	Men's freestyle 86 kg	Abdulrashid Sadulaev	Russia		Selim Yaşar	Turkey	Sharif Sharifov	Azerbaijan	
Wrestling	Men's freestyle 86 kg	Abdulrashid Sadulaev	Russia		Selim Yaşar	Turkey	J'den Cox	United States	
Wrestling	Men's freestyle 125 kg	Taha Akgul	Turkey		Komeil Ghasemi	Iran	Ibrahim Saidau	Belarus	
Wrestling	Men's freestyle 125 kg	Taha Akgul	Turkey		Komeil Ghasemi	Iran	Geno Petriashvili	Georgia	

=== Day 16: 21 August ===
Sport	Event	Gold medalist(s)			Silver medalist(s)		Bronze medalist(s)		Ref
Sport	Event	Competitor(s)	NOC	Rec	Competitor(s)	NOC	Competitor(s)	NOC	Ref
Athletics	Men's marathon	Eliud Kipchoge	Kenya		Feyisa Lilesa	Ethiopia	Galen Rupp	United States	
Basketball	Men's	Jimmy Butler; Kevin Durant; DeAndre Jordan; Kyle Lowry; Harrison Barnes; DeMar DeRozan; Kyrie Irving; Klay Thompson; DeMarcus Cousins; Paul George; Draymond Green; Carmelo Anthony	United States		Miloš Teodosić; Marko Simonović; Bogdan Bogdanović; Stefan Marković; Nikola Kalinić; Nemanja Nedović; Stefan Birčević; Miroslav Raduljica; Nikola Jokić; Vladimir Štimac; Stefan Jović; Milan Mačvan	Serbia	Pau Gasol; Rudy Fernández; Sergio Rodríguez; Juan Carlos Navarro; José Calderón; Felipe Reyes; Víctor Claver; Willy Hernangómez; Álex Abrines; Sergio Llull; Nikola Mirotić; Ricky Rubio	Spain	
Boxing	Men's flyweight	Shakhobidin Zoirov	Uzbekistan		Misha Aloyan	Russia	Yoel Finol †	Venezuela	
Boxing	Men's flyweight	Shakhobidin Zoirov	Uzbekistan		Misha Aloyan	Russia	Hu Jianguan †	China	
Boxing	Men's light welterweight	Fazliddin Gaibnazarov	Uzbekistan		Lorenzo Sotomayor	Azerbaijan	Vitaly Dunaytsev †	Russia	
Boxing	Men's light welterweight	Fazliddin Gaibnazarov	Uzbekistan		Lorenzo Sotomayor	Azerbaijan	Artem Harutyunyan †	Germany	
Boxing	Men's super heavyweight	Tony Yoka	France		Joe Joyce	Great Britain	Filip Hrgović †	Croatia	
Boxing	Men's super heavyweight	Tony Yoka	France		Joe Joyce	Great Britain	Ivan Dychko †	Kazakhstan	
Boxing	Women's middleweight	Claressa Shields	United States		Nouchka Fontijn	Netherlands	Dariga Shakimova †	Kazakhstan	
Boxing	Women's middleweight	Claressa Shields	United States		Nouchka Fontijn	Netherlands	Li Qian †	China	
Cycling	Men's cross-country	Nino Schurter	Switzerland		Jaroslav Kulhavý	Czech Republic	Carlos Coloma Nicolás	Spain	
Gymnastics	Women's rhythmic group all-around	Vera Biriukova; Anastasia Bliznyuk; Anastasia Maksimova; Anastasiia Tatareva; Maria Tolkacheva	Russia		Sandra Aguilar; Artemi Gavezou; Elena López; Lourdes Mohedano; Alejandra Quereda	Spain	Reneta Kamberova; Lyubomira Kazanova; Mihaela Maevska-Velichkova; Tsvetelina Naydenova; Hristiana Todorova	Bulgaria	
Handball	Men's	Niklas Landin Jacobsen; Mads Christiansen; Mads Mensah Larsen; Casper Ulrich Mortensen; Jesper Nøddesbo; Jannick Green; Lasse Svan Hansen; René Toft Hansen; Henrik Møllgaard; Kasper Søndergaard; Henrik Toft Hansen; Mikkel Hansen; Morten Olsen; Michael Damgaard	Denmark		Daniel Narcisse; Vincent Gérard; Nikola Karabatić; Kentin Mahé; Mathieu Grébille; Thierry Omeyer; Timothey N'Guessan; Luc Abalo; Cédric Sorhaindo; Michaël Guigou; Luka Karabatić; Ludovic Fabregas; Adrien Dipanda; Valentin Porte	France	Uwe Gensheimer; Finn Lemke; Patrick Wiencek; Tobias Reichmann; Fabian Wiede; Silvio Heinevetter; Hendrik Pekeler; Steffen Weinhold; Martin Strobel; Patrick Groetzki; Kai Häfner; Andreas Wolff; Julius Kühn; Christian Dissinger; Paul Drux	Germany	
Volleyball	Men's indoor	Bruno Rezende; Éder Carbonera; Wallace de Souza; William Arjona; Sérgio Santos; Luiz Felipe Fonteles; Maurício Souza; Douglas Souza; Lucas Saatkamp; Evandro Guerra; Ricardo Lucarelli Souza; Maurício Silva	Brazil		Daniele Sottile; Luca Vettori; Osmany Juantorena; Simone Giannelli; Salvatore Rossini; Ivan Zaytsev; Filippo Lanza; Simone Buti; Massimo Colaci; Matteo Piano; Emanuele Birarelli; Oleg Antonov	Italy	Matt Anderson; Aaron Russell; Taylor Sander; David Lee (C); Kawika Shoji; William Priddy; Murphy Troy; Thomas Jaeschke; Micah Christenson; Maxwell Holt; David Smith; Erik Shoji	United States	
Wrestling	Men's freestyle 65 kg	Soslan Ramonov	Russia		Toghrul Asgarov	Azerbaijan	Frank Chamizo	Italy	
Wrestling	Men's freestyle 65 kg	Soslan Ramonov	Russia		Toghrul Asgarov	Azerbaijan	Ikhtiyor Navruzov	Uzbekistan	
Wrestling	Men's freestyle 97 kg	Kyle Snyder	United States		Khetag Gazyumov	Azerbaijan	Albert Saritov	Romania	
Wrestling	Men's freestyle 97 kg	Kyle Snyder	United States		Khetag Gazyumov	Azerbaijan	Magomed Ibragimov	Uzbekistan	

== Notes ==
* Athlete who participated in the heats only and received medals.
† Bronze medalist(s) were determined on the previous days.
