= Hungary at the 2016 Summer Olympics =

- IOC code: HUN
- NOC: Hungarian Olympic Committee
- Website: www.olimpia.hu (in Hungarian and English)

in Rio de Janeiro
- Competitors: 160 in 21 sports
- Flag bearers: Áron Szilágyi (opening); Katinka Hosszú (closing)
- Medals Ranked 12th: Gold 8 Silver 3 Bronze 4 Total 15

Summer Olympics appearances (overview)
- 1896; 1900; 1904; 1908; 1912; 1920; 1924; 1928; 1932; 1936; 1948; 1952; 1956; 1960; 1964; 1968; 1972; 1976; 1980; 1984; 1988; 1992; 1996; 2000; 2004; 2008; 2012; 2016; 2020; 2024; 2028

Other related appearances
- 1906 Intercalated Games

Hungary competed at the 2016 Summer Olympics in Rio de Janeiro, Brazil, from 5 to 21 August 2016. Hungarian athletes have appeared in every edition of the Summer Olympic Games, except for two occasions. Hungary was not invited to the 1920 Summer Olympics in Antwerp, because of its role in the first World War, and it was also part of the Soviet boycott, when Los Angeles hosted the 1984 Summer Olympics.

== Medalists ==
Medal	Name	Sport	Event	Date
Gold	Emese Szász	Fencing	Women's épée	6 August
Gold	Katinka Hosszú	Swimming	Women's 400 m individual medley	6 August
Gold	Katinka Hosszú	Swimming	Women's 100 m backstroke	8 August
Gold	Katinka Hosszú	Swimming	Women's 200 m individual medley	9 August
Gold	Áron Szilágyi	Fencing	Men's sabre	10 August
Gold	Gabriella Szabó; Danuta Kozák	Canoeing	Women's K-2 500 m	16 August
Gold	Danuta Kozák	Canoeing	Women's K-1 500 m	18 August
Gold	Gabriella Szabó; Danuta Kozák; Tamara Csipes; Krisztina Fazekas-Zur	Canoeing	Women's K-4 500 m	20 August
Silver	Géza Imre	Fencing	Men's épée	9 August
Silver	Katinka Hosszú	Swimming	Women's 200 m backstroke	12 August
Silver	László Cseh	Swimming	Men's 100 m butterfly	12 August
Bronze	Tamás Kenderesi	Swimming	Men's 200 m butterfly	9 August
Bronze	Anita Márton	Athletics	Women's shot put	12 August
Bronze	Boglárka Kapás	Swimming	Women's 800 m freestyle	12 August
Bronze	Gábor Boczkó; Géza Imre; András Rédli; Péter Somfai	Fencing	Men's team épée	14 August

Medals by sport
Sport	1st place, gold medalist(s)	2nd place, silver medalist(s)	3rd place, bronze medalist(s)	Total
Swimming	3	2	2	7
Canoeing	3	0	0	3
Fencing	2	1	1	4
Athletics	0	0	1	1
Total	8	3	4	15

Medals by gender
Gender	1st place, gold medalist(s)	2nd place, silver medalist(s)	3rd place, bronze medalist(s)	Total
Male	1	2	2	5
Female	7	1	2	10
Total	8	3	4	15

=== Multiple medallists ===
The following competitors won several medals at the 2016 Olympic Games.

Name	Medal	Sport	Event
Katinka Hosszú	Gold; Gold; Gold; Silver	Swimming	Women's 400 m individual medley Women's 100 m backstroke Women's 200 m individual medley Women's 200 m backstroke
Danuta Kozák	Gold; Gold; Gold	Canoeing	Women's K-2 500 m Women's K-1 500 m Women's K-4 500 m
Gabriella Szabó	Gold; Gold	Canoeing	Women's K-2 500 m Women's K-4 500 m
Géza Imre	Silver; Bronze	Fencing	Men's épée Men's team épée

== Competitors ==
The following is the list of number of competitors participating in the Games. Note that reserves in fencing, field hockey, football, and handball are not counted as athletes:

Sport	Men	Women	Total
Athletics	9	10	19
Badminton	0	1	1
Boxing	2	0	2
Canoeing	10	5	15
Cycling	1	0	1
Diving	0	1	1
Fencing	6	4	10
Gymnastics	1	1	2
Judo	5	3	8
Modern pentathlon	2	2	4
Rowing	3	0	3
Sailing	3	2	5
Shooting	4	4	8
Swimming	25	12	37
Table tennis	1	2	3
Tennis	0	2	2
Triathlon	2	2	4
Water polo	13	13	26
Weightlifting	1	0	1
Wrestling	6	2	8
Total	94	66	160

Medals by date
Day	Date	1st place, gold medalist(s)	2nd place, silver medalist(s)	3rd place, bronze medalist(s)	Total
Day 1	6 August	2	0	0	2
Day 2	7 August	0	0	0	0
Day 3	8 August	1	0	0	1
Day 4	9 August	1	1	1	3
Day 5	10 August	1	0	0	1
Day 6	11 August	0	0	0	0
Day 7	12 August	0	2	2	4
Day 8	13 August	0	0	0	0
Day 9	14 August	0	0	1	1
Day 10	15 August	0	0	0	0
Day 11	16 August	1	0	0	1
Day 12	17 August	0	0	0	0
Day 13	18 August	1	0	0	1
Day 14	19 August	0	0	0	0
Day 15	20 August	1	0	0	1
Day 16	21 August	0	0	0	0
Total		8	3	4	15

== Athletics ==
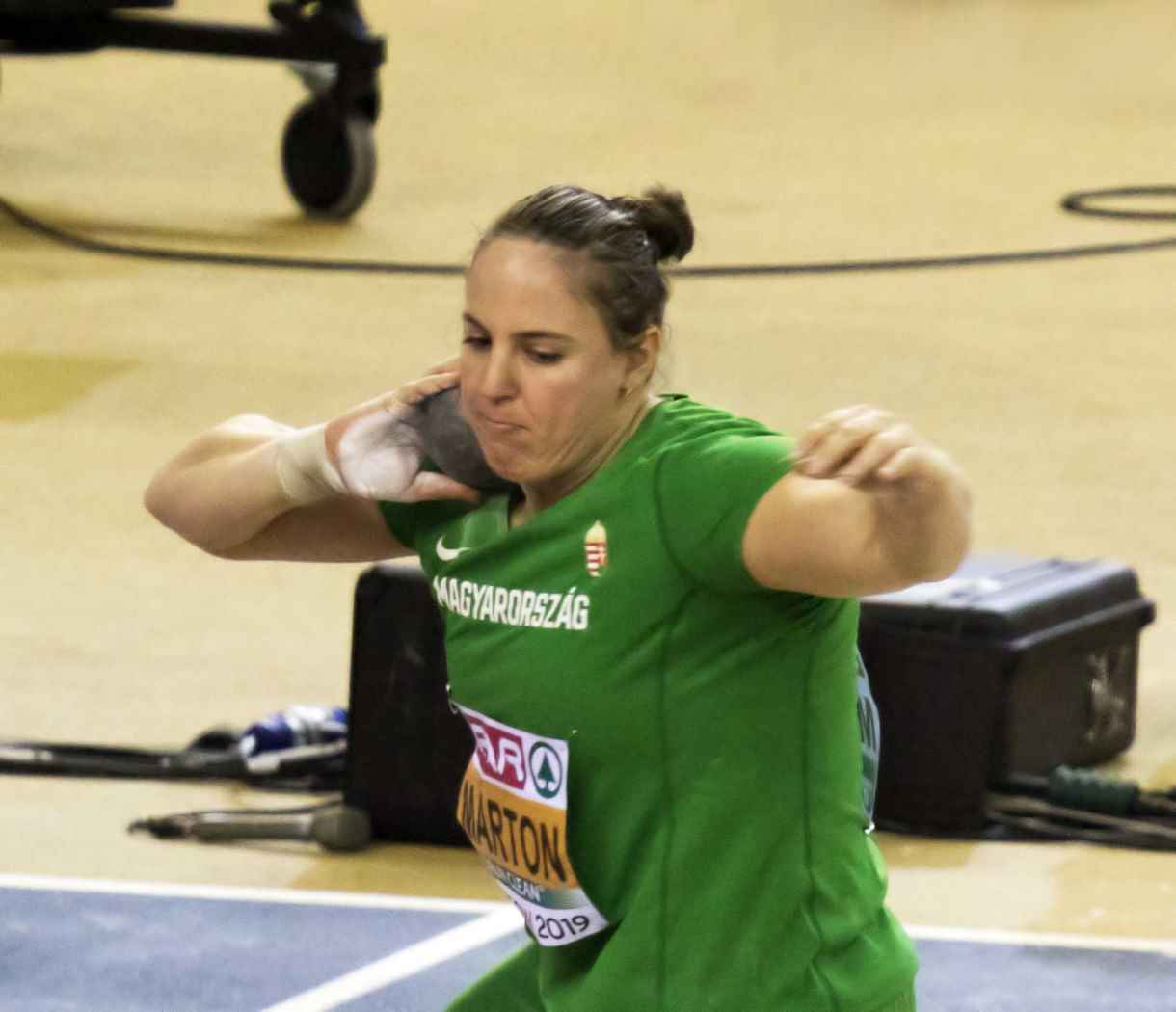
Anita Márton won a bronze medal in the Women's shot put

Hungarian athletes have so far achieved qualifying standards in the following athletics events (up to a maximum of 3 athletes in each event):

Key

- Note–Ranks given for track events are within the athlete's heat only
- Q = Qualified for the next round
- q = Qualified for the next round as a fastest loser or, in field events, by position without achieving the qualifying target
- NR = National record
- N/A = Round not applicable for the event
- Bye = Athlete not required to compete in round
- NM = No mark

Track & road events
Men

Athlete	Event	Heat		Semifinal		Final	
Athlete	Event	Result	Rank	Result	Rank	Result	Rank
Balázs Baji	110 m hurdles	13.52	2 Q	13.52	4	Did not advance	
Gáspár Csere	Marathon	—N/a				2:28:03	109
Máté Helebrandt	20 km walk	—N/a				1:22:31 PB	28
Gábor Józsa	Marathon	—N/a				2:23:22	87
Sándor Rácz	50 km walk	—N/a				DNF	
Miklós Srp	50 km walk	—N/a				DSQ	
Bence Venyercsán	50 km walk	—N/a				4:19:15	44

Women

Athlete	Event	Final	
Athlete	Event	Result	Rank
Zsófia Erdélyi	Marathon	2:39:04	52
Barbara Kovács	20 km walk	1:42:11	58
Viktória Madarász	20 km walk	1:33:59	25
Krisztina Papp	Marathon	2:42:03	65
Rita Récsei	20 km walk	1:42:41	59
Tünde Szabó	Marathon	2:45:37	83

Field events

Athlete	Event	Qualification		Final	
Athlete	Event	Distance	Position	Distance	Position
Zoltán Kővágó	Men's discus throw	63.34	9 q	64.50	7
Krisztián Pars	Men's hammer throw	75.49	4 q	75.28	7
Anita Márton	Women's shot put	18.51	6 Q	19.87	3rd place, bronze medalist(s)
Barbara Szabó	Women's high jump	1.80	=32	Did not advance	

Combined events – Women's heptathlon

Athlete	Event	100H	HJ	SP	200 m	LJ	JT	800 m	Final	Rank
Györgyi Farkas	Result	13.79 PB	1.86	14.39	25.38 SB	6.31 SB	48.07 SB	2:11.76 PB	6442 PB	8
Györgyi Farkas	Points	1008	1054	820	852	946	823	939	6442 PB	8
Xénia Krizsán	Result	13.66	1.77	13.78	25.24	6.08	49.78 SB	2:13.46 PB	6257	16
Xénia Krizsán	Points	1027	941	779	865	874	856	915	6257	16

== Badminton ==
Hungary has qualified one badminton player for the women's singles into the Olympic tournament. Laura Sarosi picked up one of the spare athlete berths freed by the Tripartite Commission as the next highest-ranked eligible player in the BWF World Rankings as of 5 May 2016.

Athlete	Event	Group Stage			Elimination	Quarterfinal	Semifinal	Final / BM	
Athlete	Event	Opposition Score	Opposition Score	Rank	Opposition Score	Opposition Score	Opposition Score	Opposition Score	Rank
Laura Sárosi	Women's singles	Sindhu (IND); L (8–21, 9–21)	Li (CAN); L (11–21, 8–21)	3	Did not advance				

== Boxing ==
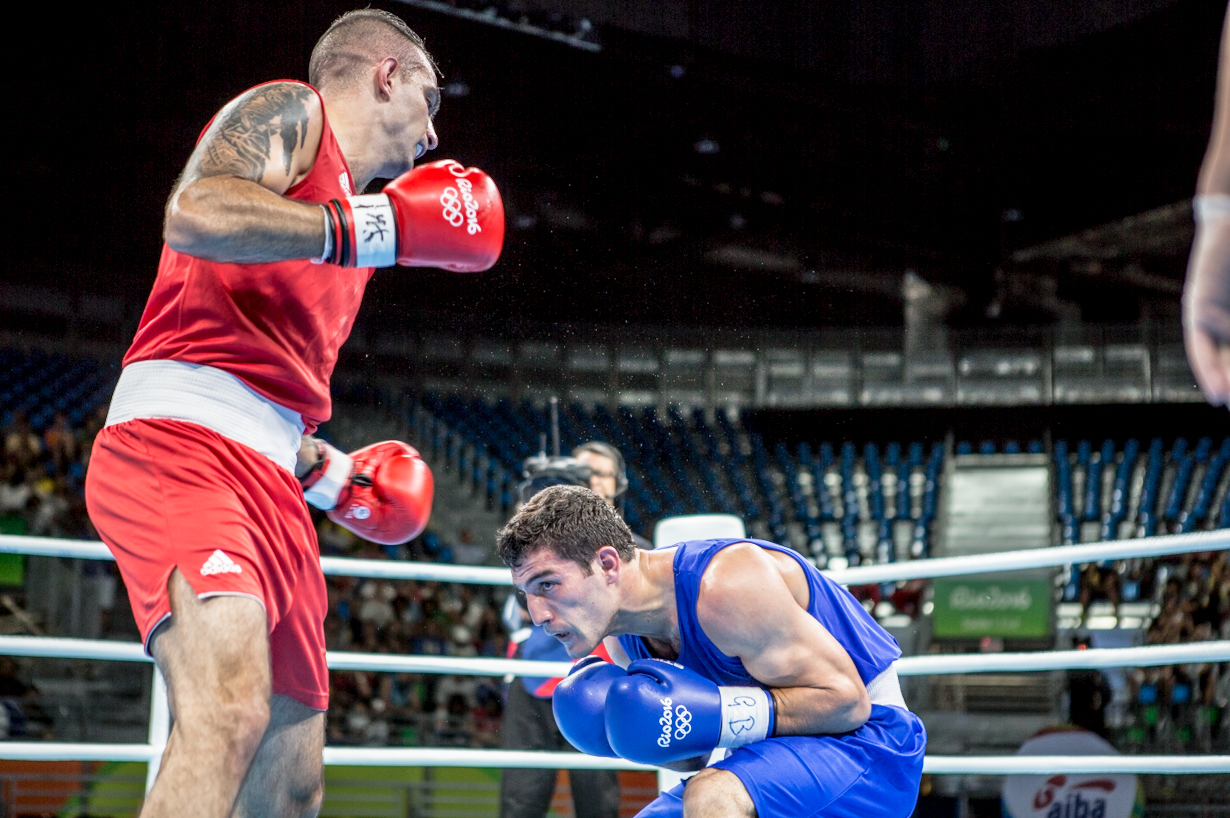
Zoltán Harcsa (left) in the first round match of the men's middleweight

Hungary has entered two boxers to compete in each of the following weight classes into the Olympic boxing tournament. London 2012 Olympian Zoltán Harcsa had claimed his Olympic spot with a semifinal victory in the men's middleweight division at the 2016 European Qualification Tournament in Samsun, Turkey, while welterweight boxer Imre Bacskai secured an additional place on the Hungarian roster with his quarterfinal triumph at the 2016 AIBA World Qualifying Tournament in Baku, Azerbaijan.

Athlete	Event	Round of 32	Round of 16	Quarterfinals	Semifinals	Final	
Athlete	Event	Opposition Result	Opposition Result	Opposition Result	Opposition Result	Opposition Result	Rank
Imre Bacskai	Men's welterweight	Cissokho (FRA); L 0–3	Did not advance				
Zoltán Harcsa	Men's middleweight	Achilov (TKM); W 2–1	López (CUB); L TKO	Did not advance			

== Canoeing ==
=== Sprint ===
Hungarian canoeists have qualified a total of eleven boats in each of the following distances for the Games through the 2015 ICF Canoe Sprint World Championships. Meanwhile, three additional boats (men's K-1 200 m, men's K-1 1000 m, and men's K-2 1000 m) were awarded to the Hungarian squad by virtue of a top two national finish at the 2016 European Qualification Regatta in Duisburg, Germany.

A total of 15 canoeists (ten men and five women) were selected to the Hungarian roster for the Olympics, following their internal selection trials (June 10 to 12). Meanwhile, the women's K-4 500 m crew (Csipes, Fazekas, Kozák, and Szabó) rounded out the flatwater canoeing lineup at the European Championships in Moscow, Russia on June 26, 2016. Missing in the roster was Beijing 2008 kayak champion Attila Vajda and four-time medalist Zoltán Kammerer in the men's kayak four.

Men

Athlete	Event	Heats		Semifinals		Final	
Athlete	Event	Time	Rank	Time	Rank	Time	Rank
Péter Molnár	K-1 200 m	35.102	3 Q	35.207	6 FB	37.896	15
Jonatán Hajdu	C-1 200 m	40.147	2 Q	40.718	4 FB	39.811	10
Bálint Kopasz	K-1 1000 m	3:38.011	5 Q	3:34.772	5 FB	3:32.392	10
Henrik Vasbányai	C-1 1000 m	4:01.953	3 Q	4:03.113	3 FB	DSQ	16
Benjámin Ceiner; Tibor Hufnágel	K-2 1000 m	3:25.580	3 Q	3:18.474	3 FA	3:15.387	7
Péter Molnár; Sándor Tótka	K-2 200 m	31.438	2 Q	32.138	1 FA	32.412	4
Róbert Mike; Henrik Vasbányai	C-2 1000 m	3:35.501	3 Q	3:56.126	3 FA	3:46.198	4
Benjámin Ceiner; Tibor Hufnágel; Attila Kugler; Tamás Somorácz	K-4 1000 m	3:00.369	5 Q	3:00.645	5 FB	3:10.388	11

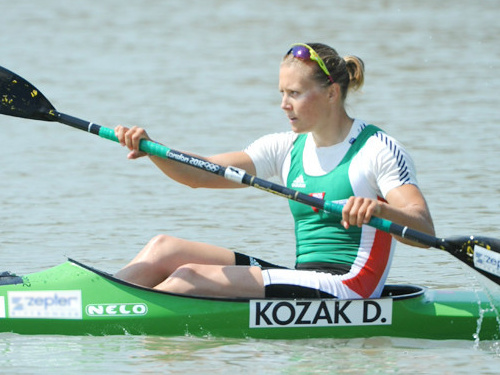
Danuta Kozák won three gold medals

Women

Athlete	Event	Heats		Semifinals		Final	
Athlete	Event	Time	Rank	Time	Rank	Time	Rank
Natasa Dusev-Janics	K-1 200 m	41.403	3 Q	40.962	4 FB	41.673	9
Danuta Kozák	K-1 500 m	1:53.427	1 Q	1:54.241	1 FA	1:52.494	1st place, gold medalist(s)
Gabriella Szabó; Danuta Kozák	K-2 500 m	1:41.092	1 FA	Bye		1:43.687	1st place, gold medalist(s)
Gabriella Szabó; Danuta Kozák; Tamara Csipes; Krisztina Fazekas-Zur	K-4 500 m	1:29.497	1 FA	Bye		1:31.48	1st place, gold medalist(s)

Qualification Legend: FA = Qualify to final (medal); FB = Qualify to final B (non-medal)

== Cycling ==
=== Mountain biking ===
Hungary has qualified one mountain biker for the men's Olympic cross-country race, by picking up the spare berth from host Brazil, as the next highest-ranked eligible NOC, not yet qualified, in the UCI Olympic Ranking List of May 25, 2016.

Athlete	Event	Time	Rank
András Parti	Men's cross-country	1:41:20	24

== Diving ==
Hungary has received an invitation from FINA to send a diver competing in the women's individual platform to the Olympics, based on her results at the 2016 FINA World Cup series.

Athlete	Event	Preliminaries		Semifinals		Final	
Athlete	Event	Points	Rank	Points	Rank	Points	Rank
Villő Kormos	Women's 10 m platform	227.70	27	Did not advance			

== Fencing ==
Hungarian fencers have qualified a full squad in the men's team épée by picking up the spare berth freed up by Africa for being the next highest ranking nation in the FIE Olympic Team Rankings.

Defending Olympic men's sabre champion Áron Szilágyi and foil fencer Aida Mohamed, who has been aiming to appear at four Olympics, secured their spots on the Hungarian team by finishing among the top 14 in the FIE Adjusted Official Rankings. Meanwhile, Tamás Decsi (men's sabre), Emese Szász (women's épée), two-time Olympian Edina Knapek (women's foil), and junior European women's sabre champion Anna Márton did the same feat as one of the two highest-ranked fencers coming from the Europe zone.

Men

Athlete	Event	Round of 64	Round of 32	Round of 16	Quarterfinal	Semifinal	Final / BM	
Athlete	Event	Opposition Score	Opposition Score	Opposition Score	Opposition Score	Opposition Score	Opposition Score	Rank
Gábor Boczkó	Épée	Bye	Bouzaid (SEN); W 15–9	Imre (HUN); L 8–15	Did not advance			
Géza Imre	Épée	Bye	Rodríguez (COL); W 15–8	Boczkó (HUN); W 15–8	Novosjolov (EST); W 15–9	Grumier (FRA); W 15–13	Park S-y (KOR); L 14–15	2nd place, silver medalist(s)
András Rédli	Épée	Al-Shatti (IOA); W 14–13	Borel (FRA); L 9–15	Did not advance				
Gábor Boczkó; Géza Imre; András Rédli; Péter Somfai	Team épée	—N/a		Bye	South Korea; W 45–42	France; L 40–45	Ukraine; W 39–37	3rd place, bronze medalist(s)
Tamás Decsi	Sabre	—N/a	Kovalev (RUS); L 10–15	Did not advance				
Áron Szilágyi	Sabre	—N/a	Ayala (MEX); W 15–9	Buikevich (BLR); W 15–12	Dolniceanu (ROU); W 15–10	Kim J-h (KOR); W 15–12	Homer (USA); W 15–8	1st place, gold medalist(s)

Women

Athlete	Event	Round of 64	Round of 32	Round of 16	Quarterfinal	Semifinal	Final / BM	
Athlete	Event	Opposition Score	Opposition Score	Opposition Score	Opposition Score	Opposition Score	Opposition Score	Rank
Emese Szász	Épée	Bye	Beljajeva (EST); W 15–11	Kang Y-m (KOR); W 15–11	Nakano (JPN); W 15–4	Rembi (FRA); W 10–6	Fiamingo (ITA); W 15–13	1st place, gold medalist(s)
Edina Knapek	Foil	Bye	Liu Ys (CHN); L 9–15	Did not advance				
Aida Mohamed	Foil	Bye	van Erven (COL); W 15–12	Deriglazova (RUS); L 6–15	Did not advance			
Anna Márton	Sabre	Bye	Benítez (VEN); W 15–14	Brunet (FRA); L 12–15	Did not advance			

== Gymnastics ==
=== Artistic ===
Hungary has entered one artistic gymnast into the Olympic competition. These Olympic berths had been awarded each to the Hungarian male and female gymnast, who both participated respectively in the apparatus and all-around events at the Olympic Test Event in Rio de Janeiro. On June 8, 2016, the Hungarian Gymnastics Federation had selected London 2012 top 8 finalist Vid Hidvégi (pommel horse), and rookie Zsófia Kovács (women's all-around) for the Olympics.

Men

Athlete	Event	Qualification								Final							
Athlete	Event	Apparatus						Total	Rank	Apparatus						Total	Rank
Athlete	Event	F	PH	R	V	PB	HB	Total	Rank	F	PH	R	V	PB	HB	Total	Rank
Vid Hidvégi	Pommel horse	—N/a	15.233	—N/a				15.233	9	Did not advance							

Women

Athlete	Event	Qualification						Final					
Athlete	Event	Apparatus				Total	Rank	Apparatus				Total	Rank
Athlete	Event	V	UB	BB	F	Total	Rank	V	UB	BB	F	Total	Rank
Zsófia Kovács	All-around	14.866	14.733	12.233	12.766	54.598	33	Did not advance					

== Judo ==
Hungary has qualified a total of eight judokas (five men and three women) for each of the following weight classes at the Games by virtue of their top 22 national finish for men and top 14 for women in the IJF World Ranking List of May 30, 2016.

Men

Athlete	Event	Round of 64	Round of 32	Round of 16	Quarterfinals	Semifinals	Repechage	Final / BM	
Athlete	Event	Opposition Result	Opposition Result	Opposition Result	Opposition Result	Opposition Result	Opposition Result	Opposition Result	Rank
Miklós Ungvári	−73 kg	Bye	Saraiva (POR); W 011–000	Elmont (NED); W 100–000	Orujov (AZE); L 000–010	Did not advance	Delpopolo (USA); W 000–000 S	van Tichelt (BEL); L 000–100	5
László Csoknyai	−81 kg	Bye	Nagase (JPN); L 000–001	Did not advance					
Krisztián Tóth	−90 kg	Bye	Sang (KEN); W 100–000	Cheng Xz (CHN); L 000–100	Did not advance				
Miklós Cirjenics	−100 kg	Bye	Frey (GER); L 000–100	Did not advance					
Barna Bor	+100 kg	—N/a	Jaballah (TUN); W 101–000	García (CUB); L 000–000 S	Did not advance				

Women

Athlete	Event	Round of 32	Round of 16	Quarterfinals	Semifinals	Repechage	Final / BM	
Athlete	Event	Opposition Result	Opposition Result	Opposition Result	Opposition Result	Opposition Result	Opposition Result	Rank
Éva Csernoviczki	−48 kg	Bye	Cherniak (UKR); W 003–000	Pareto (ARG); L 000–010	Did not advance	Galbadrakh (KAZ); L 000–100	Did not advance	7
Hedvig Karakas	−57 kg	Nurjavova (TKM); W 101–000	Beauchemin-Pinard (CAN); W 000–000 S	R Silva (BRA); L 000–010	Did not advance	Lien C-l (TPE); L 000–001	Did not advance	7
Abigél Joó	−78 kg	Pürevjargal (MGL); W 111–000	Umeki (JPN); W 002–000	Harrison (USA); L 000–100	Did not advance	Castillo (CUB); L 000–001	Did not advance	7

== Modern pentathlon ==
Hungarian athletes have qualified for the following spots to compete in modern pentathlon. Sarolta Kovács accepted an unused quota place in the women's event through her sixth-place finish at the 2015 World Championships, while her teammate Zsófia Földházi had claimed an Olympic spot as one of the three highest-ranked modern pentathletes, not yet qualified, at the 2016 World Championships. Bence Demeter and London 2012 bronze medalist Ádám Marosi were ranked among the top 10 modern pentathletes, not yet qualified, in the men's event based on the UIPM World Rankings as of June 1, 2016.

Athlete	Event	Fencing (épée one touch)				Swimming (200 m freestyle)			Riding (show jumping)			Combined: shooting/running (10 m air pistol)/(3200 m)			Total points	Final rank
Athlete	Event	RR	BR	Rank	MP points	Time	Rank	MP points	Penalties	Rank	MP points	Time	Rank	MP Points	Total points	Final rank
Bence Demeter	Men's	19–16	3	12	214	2:03.89	17	329	35	29	265	11:21.98	13	619	1430	17
Ádám Marosi	Men's	16–19	0	26	196	2:01.66	9	335	7	9	293	11:19.84	9	621	1445	12
Zsófia Földházi	Women's	11–24	2	33	168	2:12.05	7	304	78	29	222	12:46.02	10	534	1228	27
Sarolta Kovács	Women's	17–18	1	16	203	2:09.02	3	313	32	24	268	13:17.09	24	503	1287	17

== Rowing ==
Hungary has qualified two boats for each of the following rowing classes into the Olympic regatta. The men's single sculls and men's pair rowers had confirmed their Olympic boats by virtue of a top two national finish at the 2016 European & Final Qualification Regatta in Lucerne, Switzerland.

Athlete	Event	Heats		Repechage		Quarterfinals		Semifinals		Final	
Athlete	Event	Time	Rank	Time	Rank	Time	Rank	Time	Rank	Time	Rank
Bendegúz Pétervári-Molnár	Men's single sculls	7:12.86	2 QF	Bye		6:52.80	4 SC/D	7:18.88	1 FC	6:57.75	14
Adrián Juhász; Béla Simon	Men's pair	6:59.28	3 SA/B	Bye		—N/a		6:29.12	4 FB	7:03.34	9

Qualification Legend: FA=Final A (medal); FB=Final B (non-medal); FC=Final C (non-medal); FD=Final D (non-medal); FE=Final E (non-medal); FF=Final F (non-medal); SA/B=Semifinals A/B; SC/D=Semifinals C/D; SE/F=Semifinals E/F; QF=Quarterfinals; R=Repechage

== Sailing ==
Hungarian sailors have qualified one boat in each of the following classes through the 2014 ISAF Sailing World Championships, the individual fleet Worlds, and European qualifying regattas.

Athlete	Event	Race													Net points	Final rank
Athlete	Event	1	2	3	4	5	6	7	8	9	10	11	12	M*	Net points	Final rank
Áron Gádorfalvi	Men's RS:X	30	28	29	25	20	20	25	~~DNF~~	26	27	24	23	EL	277	25
Benjámin Vadnai	Men's Laser	9	44	21	21	~~DNF~~	30	30	39	29	25	—N/a		EL	248	33
Zsombor Berecz	Men's Finn	9	~~UFD~~	5	12	1	7	12	18	16	12	—N/a		EL	92	12
Sára Cholnoky	Women's RS:X	22	14	21	19	24	24	13	22	25	~~DNF~~	25	DNF	EL	235	23
Mária Érdi	Women's Laser Radial	20	22	1	5	~~26~~	20	10	18	9	20	—N/a		EL	125	14

M = Medal race; EL = Eliminated – did not advance into the medal race

== Shooting ==
Hungarian shooters have achieved quota places for the following events by virtue of their best finishes at the 2014 and 2015 ISSF World Championships, the 2015 ISSF World Cup series, and European Championships or Games, as long as they obtained a minimum qualifying score (MQS) by March 31, 2016. The shooting squad was announced on March 30, 2016, with the rifle specialist Péter Sidi remarkably going to his fifth Olympics, and pistol shooter Zsófia Csonka to her fourth.

Men

Athlete	Event	Qualification		Final	
Athlete	Event	Points	Rank	Points	Rank
István Péni	10 m air rifle	624.0	13	Did not advance	
István Péni	50 m rifle 3 positions	1172	12	Did not advance	
Péter Sidi	10 m air rifle	625.9	6 Q	142.7	5
Péter Sidi	50 m rifle prone	623.3	10	Did not advance	
Péter Sidi	50 m rifle 3 positions	1162	34	Did not advance	
Norbert Szabián	50 m rifle prone	617.3	42	Did not advance	
Miklós Tátrai	10 m air pistol	567	42	Did not advance	
Miklós Tátrai	50 m pistol	539	34	Did not advance	

Women

Athlete	Event	Qualification		Semifinal		Final	
Athlete	Event	Points	Rank	Points	Rank	Points	Rank
Zsófia Csonka	25 m pistol	581	10	Did not advance			
Viktória Egri	10 m air pistol	376	36	—N/a		Did not advance	
Julianna Miskolczi	10 m air rifle	414.0	22	—N/a		Did not advance	
Julianna Miskolczi	50 m rifle 3 positions	577	22	—N/a		Did not advance	
Renáta Tobai-Sike	10 m air pistol	380	17	—N/a		Did not advance	
Renáta Tobai-Sike	25 m pistol	577	16	Did not advance			

Qualification Legend: Q = Qualify for the next round; q = Qualify for the bronze medal (shotgun)

== Swimming ==
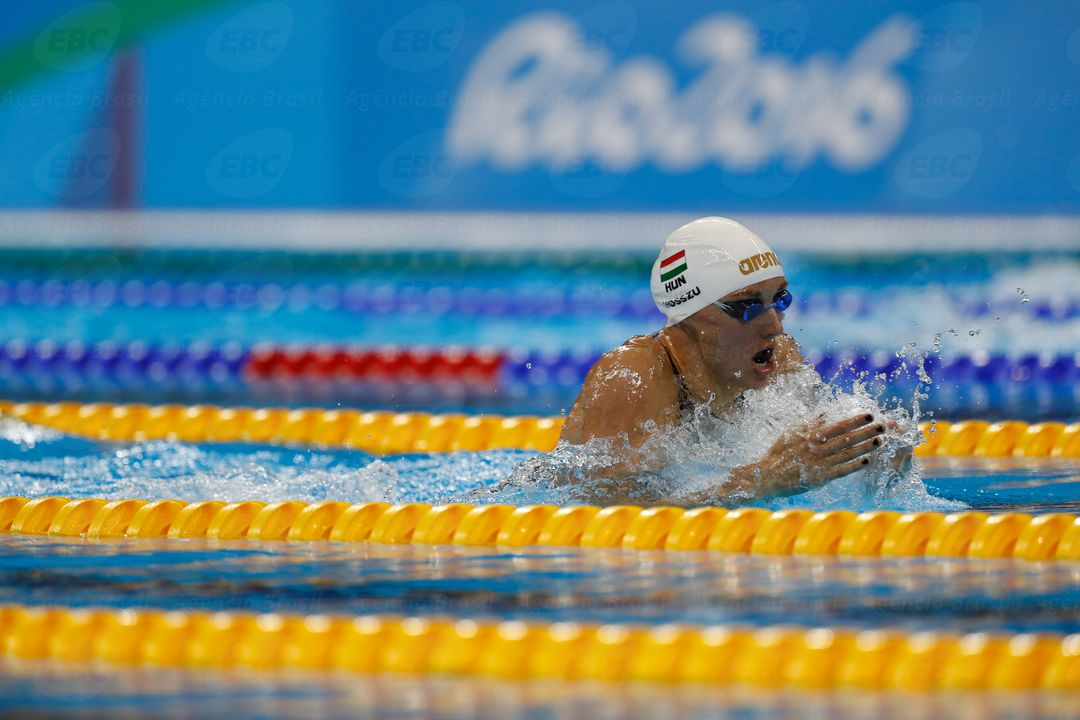
With 3 gold medals and 1 silver, Katinka Hosszú won more medals in individual events than any other swimmer in the Rio Olympics

Hungarian swimmers have so far achieved qualifying standards in the following events (up to a maximum of 2 swimmers in each event at the Olympic Qualifying Time (OQT), and potentially 1 at the Olympic Selection Time (OST)):

A total of 35 swimmers (24 men and 11 women) were named to the Hungarian roster for the Olympics at the end of the qualifying period, the largest ever in history, with London 2012 breaststroke champion Dániel Gyurta, five-time medalist László Cseh, and multiple-time World champion Katinka Hosszú racing in the pool at their fourth straight Games.

Men

Athlete	Event	Heat		Semifinal		Final	
Athlete	Event	Time	Rank	Time	Rank	Time	Rank
Gábor Balog	100 m backstroke	54.48	25	Did not advance			
Péter Bernek	200 m freestyle	1:49.73	37	Did not advance			
Péter Bernek	400 m freestyle	3:48.58	21	—N/a		Did not advance	
Richárd Bohus	100 m freestyle	48.86	24	Did not advance			
László Cseh	100 m butterfly	51.52	2 Q	51.57	4 Q	51.14	2nd place, silver medalist(s)
László Cseh	200 m butterfly	1:55.14	2 Q	1:55.18	3 Q	1:56.24	7
Dávid Földházi	200 m backstroke	1:59.69	22	Did not advance			
Dániel Gyurta	100 m breaststroke	1:00.26	16**	Did not advance			
Dániel Gyurta	200 m breaststroke	2:11.28	17	Did not advance			
Gergely Gyurta	1500 m freestyle	15:06.24	19	—N/a		Did not advance	
Gergely Gyurta	400 m individual medley	4:14.81	11	—N/a		Did not advance	
Dávid Horváth	200 m breaststroke	2:13.24	30	Did not advance			
Tamás Kenderesi	200 m butterfly	1:54.73	1 Q	1:53.96	1 Q	1:53.62	3rd place, bronze medalist(s)
Gergő Kis	400 m freestyle	3:54.15	38	—N/a		Did not advance	
Dominik Kozma	100 m freestyle	48.92	26	Did not advance			
Dominik Kozma	200 m freestyle	1:46.68	12 Q	1:47.53	15	Did not advance	
Márk Papp	10 km open water	—N/a				1:53:11.7	13
Bence Pulai	100 m butterfly	52.73	26	Did not advance			
Kristóf Rasovszky	1500 m freestyle	15:29.36	35	—N/a		Did not advance	
Krisztián Takács	50 m freestyle	22.12	17	Did not advance			
Ádám Telegdy	200 m backstroke	1:59.09	19	Did not advance			
Dávid Verrasztó	200 m individual medley	DNS		Did not advance			
Dávid Verrasztó	400 m individual medley	4:15.04	12	—N/a		Did not advance	
Richárd Bohus; Péter Holoda; Dominik Kozma; Krisztián Takács	4 × 100 m freestyle relay	3:15.21	12	—N/a		Did not advance	
Péter Bernek; Benjámin Grátz; Gergő Kis; Dominik Kozma	4 × 200 m freestyle relay	7:18.51	16	—N/a		Did not advance	
Gábor Balog; Richárd Bohus; László Cseh; Dániel Gyurta; Dominik Kozma*	4 × 100 m medley relay	3:33.89	9	—N/a		Did not advance	

** Gyurta was tied for sixteenth place, but withdrew from the swim-off.

Women

Athlete	Event	Heat		Semifinal		Final	
Athlete	Event	Time	Rank	Time	Rank	Time	Rank
Réka György	200 m backstroke	2:12.99	22	Did not advance			
Katinka Hosszú	100 m backstroke	59.13	4 Q	58.94	2 Q	58.45 NR	1st place, gold medalist(s)
Katinka Hosszú	200 m backstroke	2:06.09 NR	1 Q	2:06.03 NR	1 Q	2:06.05	2nd place, silver medalist(s)
Katinka Hosszú	200 m butterfly	DNS		Did not advance			
Katinka Hosszú	200 m individual medley	2:07.45 OR	1 Q	2:08.13	2 Q	2:06.58 OR	1st place, gold medalist(s)
Katinka Hosszú	400 m individual medley	4:28.58	1 Q	—N/a		4:26.36 WR	1st place, gold medalist(s)
Zsuzsanna Jakabos	200 m individual medley	2:11.69	9 Q	2:12.05	10	Did not advance	
Zsuzsanna Jakabos	400 m individual medley	4:38.52	13	—N/a		Did not advance	
Boglárka Kapás	400 m freestyle	4:04.11	7 Q	—N/a		4:02.37 NR	4
Boglárka Kapás	800 m freestyle	8:19.43	2 Q	—N/a		8:16.37 NR	3rd place, bronze medalist(s)
Ajna Késely	200 m freestyle	1:59.20	25	Did not advance			
Ajna Késely	400 m freestyle	4:12.40	21	—N/a		Did not advance	
Flóra Molnár	50 m freestyle	25.07	25	Did not advance			
Anna Olasz	10 km open water	—N/a				1:57:45.5	14
Éva Risztov	800 m freestyle	8:33.36	14	—N/a		Did not advance	
Éva Risztov	10 km open water	—N/a				1:57:42.8	13
Dalma Sebestyén	200 m breaststroke	2:27.94	19	Did not advance			
Liliána Szilágyi	100 m butterfly	57.70 NR	9 Q	58.31	12	Did not advance	
Liliána Szilágyi	200 m butterfly	2:06.99	4 Q	2:07.34	10	Did not advance	
Anna Sztankovics	100 m breaststroke	1:08.06	24	Did not advance			
Anna Sztankovics	200 m breaststroke	2:27.97	20	Did not advance			
Evelyn Verrasztó	200 m freestyle	1:59.44	28	Did not advance			
Katinka Hosszú; Zsuzsanna Jakabos; Boglárka Kapás; Ajna Késely*; Evelyn Verrasztó	4 × 200 m freestyle relay	7:51.17	5 Q	—N/a		7:51.03	6

== Table tennis ==
Hungary has entered three athletes into the table tennis competition at the Games. Remarkably going to her third Olympics, Georgina Póta was automatically selected among the top 22 eligible players in the women's singles based on the ITTF Olympic Rankings. Meanwhile, Póta's teammate Petra Lovas and London 2012 Olympian Ádám Pattantyús granted their invitations from ITTF to compete in their respective singles events, as one of the next seven highest-ranked eligible players, not yet qualified, on the Olympic Ranking List.

Athlete	Event	Preliminary	Round 1	Round 2	Round 3	Round of 16	Quarterfinals	Semifinals	Final / BM	
Athlete	Event	Opposition Result	Opposition Result	Opposition Result	Opposition Result	Opposition Result	Opposition Result	Opposition Result	Opposition Result	Rank
Ádám Pattantyús	Men's singles	Bye	Gerassimenko (KAZ); W 4–1	Li P (QAT); L 0–4	Did not advance					
Petra Lovas	Women's singles	Bye	El-Dawlatly (EGY); W 4–0	Ri M-s (PRK); L 1–4	Did not advance					
Georgina Póta	Women's singles	Bye		Zhang (CAN); W 4–1	Doo H K (HKG); L 2–4	Did not advance				

== Tennis ==
Hungary has entered two tennis player into the Olympic tournament. London 2012 Olympian Tímea Babos (world no. 39) qualified directly for the women's singles as one of the top 56 eligible players in the WTA World Rankings as of June 6, 2016. Having been directly entered to the singles, Babos also opted to play with her rookie partner Réka Luca Jani in the women's doubles.

Athlete	Event	Round of 64	Round of 32	Round of 16	Quarterfinals	Semifinals	Final / BM	
Athlete	Event	Opposition Score	Opposition Score	Opposition Score	Opposition Score	Opposition Score	Opposition Score	Rank
Tímea Babos	Women's singles	Kvitová (CZE); L 1–6, 2–6	Did not advance					
Tímea Babos; Réka Luca Jani	Women's doubles	—N/a	Mitu / Olaru (ROU); L 3–6, 4–6	Did not advance				

== Triathlon ==
Hungary has qualified a total of four triathletes for the following events at the Games. Gabon Faldum, Tamás Tóth, Margit Vanek, and London 2012 Olympian Zsófia Kovács were ranked among the top 40 eligible triathletes in the men's and women's event, respectively, based on the ITU Olympic Qualification List as of May 15, 2016.

Athlete	Event	Swim (1.5 km)	Trans 1	Bike (40 km)	Trans 2	Run (10 km)	Total Time	Rank
Gábor Faldum	Men's	18:00	0:45	55:56	0:33	33:06	1:48:20	20
Tamás Tóth	Men's	17:30	0:47	57:02	0:38	34:05	1:50:02	33
Zsófia Kovács	Women's	19:20	0:53	1:04:29	0:36	36:11	2:01:29	24
Margit Vanek	Women's	19:10	0:59	1:04:35	0:41	41:29	2:06:54	45

== Water polo ==
Summary

Key:

- FT – After full time.
- P – Match decided by penalty-shootout.

Team	Event	Group Stage						Quarterfinal	Semifinal	Final / BM	
Team	Event	Opposition Score	Opposition Score	Opposition Score	Opposition Score	Opposition Score	Rank	Opposition Score	Opposition Score	Opposition Score	Rank
Hungary men's	Men's tournament	Serbia; D 13–13	Australia; D 9–9	Greece; D 8–8	Japan; W 17–7	Brazil; W 10–6	1	Montenegro; L 2–4^{P} FT: 9–9	Brazil; W 13–4	Greece; W 12–10	5
Hungary women's	Women's tournament	China; W 13–11	Spain; L 10–11	United States; L 6–11	—N/a		3	Australia; W 5–3^{P} FT: 8–8	United States; L 10–14	Russia; L 6–7^{P} FT: 12–12	4

=== Men's tournament ===
Hungary men's water polo team qualified for the Olympics by virtue of a top four finish at the Olympic Qualification Tournament in Trieste.

Team roster

The following is the Hungarian roster in the men's water polo tournament of the 2016 Summer Olympics.

Head coach: Tibor Benedek

№	Name	Pos.	Height	Weight	Date of birth	2016 club
1	Viktor Nagy	GK	1.98 m (6 ft 6 in)	100 kg (220 lb)	24 July 1984	(Hungary) Szolnoki Dózsa
2	Gergő Zalánki	CB	1.92 m (6 ft 4 in)	85 kg (187 lb)	26 February 1995	(Hungary) Orvosegyetem
3	Krisztián Manhercz	D	1.85 m (6 ft 1 in)	84 kg (185 lb)	6 February 1997	(Hungary) Szeged
4	Balázs Erdélyi	D	1.96 m (6 ft 5 in)	94 kg (207 lb)	16 February 1990	(Hungary) Eger
5	Márton Vámos	D	1.99 m (6 ft 6 in)	105 kg (231 lb)	24 June 1992	(Hungary) Szolnoki Dózsa
6	Norbert Hosnyánszky	D	1.96 m (6 ft 5 in)	101 kg (223 lb)	4 March 1984	(Hungary) Eger
7	Ádám Decker	D	2.03 m (6 ft 8 in)	110 kg (243 lb)	29 February 1984	(Hungary) Eger
8	Márton Szívós	CB	1.92 m (6 ft 4 in)	95 kg (209 lb)	19 August 1981	(Hungary) Bp. Honvéd
9	Dániel Varga	D	2.01 m (6 ft 7 in)	96 kg (212 lb)	24 September 1983	(Hungary) Ferencváros
10	Dénes Varga (c)	D	1.93 m (6 ft 4 in)	97 kg (214 lb)	29 March 1987	(Hungary) Szolnoki Dózsa
11	Gábor Kis	CF	1.94 m (6 ft 4 in)	110 kg (243 lb)	27 September 1982	(Hungary) Szolnoki Dózsa
12	Balázs Hárai	CF	2.02 m (6 ft 8 in)	110 kg (243 lb)	5 April 1987	(Hungary) Eger
13	Attila Decker	GK	1.97 m (6 ft 6 in)	78 kg (172 lb)	25 August 1987	(Hungary) Bp. Honvéd

Group play

Pos	Team	Pld	W	D	L	GF	GA	GD	Pts	Qualification
1	Hungary	5	2	3	0	57	43	+14	7	Quarter-finals
2	Greece	5	2	2	1	41	40	+1	6	Quarter-finals
3	Brazil (H)	5	3	0	2	40	39	+1	6	Quarter-finals
4	Serbia	5	2	2	1	49	44	+5	6	Quarter-finals
5	Australia	5	2	1	2	44	40	+4	5	
6	Japan	5	0	0	5	36	61	−25	0	

Source: Rio2016
Rules for classification: 1) Points; 2) Head-to-head points; 3) Head-to-head goal difference; 4) Head-to-head goals scored; 5) Goal difference.
(H) Hosts

6 August 2016; 09:00	Report	Serbia	13–13	Hungary	Maria Lenk Aquatic Center, Rio de Janeiro; Referees: Adrian Alexandrescu (ROU), Radosław Koryzna (POL)
6 August 2016; 09:00	Report	Score by quarters: 3–5, 3–4, 3–2, 4–2			Maria Lenk Aquatic Center, Rio de Janeiro; Referees: Adrian Alexandrescu (ROU), Radosław Koryzna (POL)
6 August 2016; 09:00	Report	Filipović 3	Goals	Hosnyánszky 3	Maria Lenk Aquatic Center, Rio de Janeiro; Referees: Adrian Alexandrescu (ROU), Radosław Koryzna (POL)

8 August 2016; 13:00	Report	Hungary	9–9	Australia	Maria Lenk Aquatic Center, Rio de Janeiro; Referees: Boris Margeta (SLO), Filippo Gomez (ITA)
8 August 2016; 13:00	Report	Score by quarters: 4–3, 2–2, 1–3, 2–1			Maria Lenk Aquatic Center, Rio de Janeiro; Referees: Boris Margeta (SLO), Filippo Gomez (ITA)
8 August 2016; 13:00	Report	three players 2	Goals	Campbell 4	Maria Lenk Aquatic Center, Rio de Janeiro; Referees: Boris Margeta (SLO), Filippo Gomez (ITA)

10 August 2016; 10:20	Report	Greece	8–8	Hungary	Maria Lenk Aquatic Center, Rio de Janeiro; Referees: Nenad Peris (CRO), Mark Koganov (AZE)
10 August 2016; 10:20	Report	Score by quarters: 1–2, 1–1, 4–2, 2–3			Maria Lenk Aquatic Center, Rio de Janeiro; Referees: Nenad Peris (CRO), Mark Koganov (AZE)
10 August 2016; 10:20	Report	Vlachopoulos 3	Goals	Hárai 3	Maria Lenk Aquatic Center, Rio de Janeiro; Referees: Nenad Peris (CRO), Mark Koganov (AZE)

12 August 2016; 09:00	Report	Hungary	17–7	Japan	Maria Lenk Aquatic Center, Rio de Janeiro; Referees: Stanko Ivanovski (MNE), Masoud Rezvani (IRI)
12 August 2016; 09:00	Report	Score by quarters: 5–1, 6–2, 2–2, 4–2			Maria Lenk Aquatic Center, Rio de Janeiro; Referees: Stanko Ivanovski (MNE), Masoud Rezvani (IRI)
12 August 2016; 09:00	Report	Kis 5	Goals	Takei 3	Maria Lenk Aquatic Center, Rio de Janeiro; Referees: Stanko Ivanovski (MNE), Masoud Rezvani (IRI)

14 August 2016; 20:50	Report	Brazil	6–10	Hungary	Olympic Aquatics Stadium, Rio de Janeiro; Referees: Francesc Buch (ESP), Stanko Ivanovski (MNE)
14 August 2016; 20:50	Report	Score by quarters: 0–3, 1–2, 3–3, 2–2			Olympic Aquatics Stadium, Rio de Janeiro; Referees: Francesc Buch (ESP), Stanko Ivanovski (MNE)
14 August 2016; 20:50	Report	Gomes, Perrone 2	Goals	three players 2	Olympic Aquatics Stadium, Rio de Janeiro; Referees: Francesc Buch (ESP), Stanko Ivanovski (MNE)

Quarterfinal

16 August 2016; 11:00	Report	Hungary	9–9; PSO: 2–4	Montenegro	Olympic Aquatics Stadium, Rio de Janeiro; Referees: Mark Koganov (AZE), Joseph Peila (USA)
16 August 2016; 11:00	Report	Score by quarters: 1–2, 2–3, 3–3, 3–1			Olympic Aquatics Stadium, Rio de Janeiro; Referees: Mark Koganov (AZE), Joseph Peila (USA)
16 August 2016; 11:00	Report	Erdélyi, Vámos 3	Goals	Ivović 3	Olympic Aquatics Stadium, Rio de Janeiro; Referees: Mark Koganov (AZE), Joseph Peila (USA)

Classification semifinal (5–8)

18 August 2016; 11:00	Report	Hungary	13–4	Brazil	Olympic Aquatics Stadium, Rio de Janeiro; Referees: Filippo Gomez (ITA), Masoud Rezvani (IRI)
18 August 2016; 11:00	Report	Score by quarters: 4–1, 3–0, 4–3, 2–0			Olympic Aquatics Stadium, Rio de Janeiro; Referees: Filippo Gomez (ITA), Masoud Rezvani (IRI)
18 August 2016; 11:00	Report	Erdélyi 4	Goals	Delgado 2	Olympic Aquatics Stadium, Rio de Janeiro; Referees: Filippo Gomez (ITA), Masoud Rezvani (IRI)

Fifth place match

20 August 2016; 16:30	Report	Hungary	12–10	Greece	Olympic Aquatics Stadium, Rio de Janeiro; Referees: Mark Koganov (AZE), Joseph Peila (USA)
20 August 2016; 16:30	Report	Score by quarters: 2–1, 4–4, 3–3, 3–2			Olympic Aquatics Stadium, Rio de Janeiro; Referees: Mark Koganov (AZE), Joseph Peila (USA)
20 August 2016; 16:30	Report	Kis, Zalánki 3	Goals	four players 2	Olympic Aquatics Stadium, Rio de Janeiro; Referees: Mark Koganov (AZE), Joseph Peila (USA)

=== Women's tournament ===
Hungary women's water polo team qualified for the Olympics by attaining a top finish and securing a lone outright berth at the 2016 European Championships in Belgrade, Serbia.

Team roster

The following is the Hungarian roster in the women's water polo tournament of the 2016 Summer Olympics.

Head coach: Attila Bíró

№	Name	Pos.	Height	Weight	Date of birth	2016 club
1	Edina Gangl	GK	1.81 m (5 ft 11 in)	64 kg (141 lb)	25 June 1990	(Hungary) UVSE
2	Dóra Czigány	D	1.73 m (5 ft 8 in)	60 kg (132 lb)	23 October 1992	(Hungary) Eger
3	Dóra Antal	D	1.69 m (5 ft 7 in)	62 kg (137 lb)	9 September 1993	(Hungary) UVSE
4	Hanna Kisteleki	CF	1.72 m (5 ft 8 in)	63 kg (139 lb)	10 March 1991	(Hungary) UVSE
5	Gabriella Szűcs	D	1.83 m (6 ft 0 in)	74 kg (163 lb)	7 March 1988	(Hungary) UVSE
6	Orsolya Takács	CB	1.90 m (6 ft 3 in)	83 kg (183 lb)	20 May 1985	(Hungary) BVSC
7	Anna Illés	CB	1.80 m (5 ft 11 in)	73 kg (161 lb)	21 February 1994	(United States) California Golden Bears
8	Rita Keszthelyi (c)	D	1.78 m (5 ft 10 in)	67 kg (148 lb)	10 December 1991	(Hungary) UVSE
9	Ildikó Tóth	CF	1.75 m (5 ft 9 in)	72 kg (159 lb)	23 April 1987	(Hungary) UVSE
10	Barbara Bujka	CF	1.72 m (5 ft 8 in)	82 kg (181 lb)	5 September 1986	(Hungary) Szeged
11	Dóra Csabai	CB	1.75 m (5 ft 9 in)	63 kg (139 lb)	20 April 1989	(Hungary) UVSE
12	Krisztina Garda	CB	1.70 m (5 ft 7 in)	76 kg (168 lb)	16 July 1994	(Hungary) Dunaújvárosi Főiskola
13	Orsolya Kasó	GK	1.87 m (6 ft 2 in)	72 kg (159 lb)	22 November 1988	(Hungary) Dunaújvárosi Főiskola

Group play

Pos	Team	Pld	W	D	L	GF	GA	GD	Pts	Qualification
1	United States	3	3	0	0	34	14	+20	6	Quarter-finals
2	Spain	3	2	0	1	27	29	−2	4	Quarter-finals
3	Hungary	3	1	0	2	29	33	−4	2	Quarter-finals
4	China	3	0	0	3	23	37	−14	0	Quarter-finals

Source: Rio2016
Rules for classification: 1) Points; 2) Head-to-head points; 3) Head-to-head goal difference; 4) Head-to-head goals scored; 5) Goal difference.

9 August 2016; 09:00	Report	China	11–13	Hungary	Maria Lenk Aquatic Center, Rio de Janeiro; Referees: Nenad Peris (CRO), Georgios Stavridis (GRE)
9 August 2016; 09:00	Report	Score by quarters: 2–2, 4–4, 3–6, 2–1			Maria Lenk Aquatic Center, Rio de Janeiro; Referees: Nenad Peris (CRO), Georgios Stavridis (GRE)
9 August 2016; 09:00	Report	Ma Huanhuan, Niu Guannan 3	Goals	Czigány 4	Maria Lenk Aquatic Center, Rio de Janeiro; Referees: Nenad Peris (CRO), Georgios Stavridis (GRE)

11 August 2016; 13:00	Report	Spain	11–10	Hungary	Maria Lenk Aquatic Center, Rio de Janeiro; Referees: Marie-Claude Deslières (CAN), Vojin Putniković (SRB)
11 August 2016; 13:00	Report	Score by quarters: 2–2, 4–4, 4–1, 1–3			Maria Lenk Aquatic Center, Rio de Janeiro; Referees: Marie-Claude Deslières (CAN), Vojin Putniković (SRB)
11 August 2016; 13:00	Report	five players 2	Goals	Bujka 5	Maria Lenk Aquatic Center, Rio de Janeiro; Referees: Marie-Claude Deslières (CAN), Vojin Putniković (SRB)

13 August 2016; 13:00	Report	Hungary	6–11	United States	Maria Lenk Aquatic Center, Rio de Janeiro; Referees: Marie-Claude Deslières (CAN), Diana Dutilh-Dumas (NED)
13 August 2016; 13:00	Report	Score by quarters: 2–2, 1–5, 1–1, 2–3			Maria Lenk Aquatic Center, Rio de Janeiro; Referees: Marie-Claude Deslières (CAN), Diana Dutilh-Dumas (NED)
13 August 2016; 13:00	Report	Szűcs 2	Goals	Steffens 4	Maria Lenk Aquatic Center, Rio de Janeiro; Referees: Marie-Claude Deslières (CAN), Diana Dutilh-Dumas (NED)

Quarterfinal

15 August 2016; 15:30	Report	Australia	11–13 (PSO)	Hungary	Olympic Aquatics Stadium, Rio de Janeiro; Referees: Francesc Buch (ESP), Vojin Putniković (SRB)
15 August 2016; 15:30	Report	Score by quarters: 1–3, 2–2, 3–2, 2–1 PSO: 3–5			Olympic Aquatics Stadium, Rio de Janeiro; Referees: Francesc Buch (ESP), Vojin Putniković (SRB)
15 August 2016; 15:30	Report	Southern 3	Goals	Bujka, Keszthelyi 2	Olympic Aquatics Stadium, Rio de Janeiro; Referees: Francesc Buch (ESP), Vojin Putniković (SRB)

Semifinal

17 August 2016; 16:30	Report	Hungary	10–14	United States	Olympic Aquatics Stadium, Rio de Janeiro; Referees: Daniel Flahive (AUS), Georgios Stavridis (GRE)
17 August 2016; 16:30	Report	Score by quarters: 2–3, 3–5, 3–4, 2–2			Olympic Aquatics Stadium, Rio de Janeiro; Referees: Daniel Flahive (AUS), Georgios Stavridis (GRE)
17 August 2016; 16:30	Report	Keszthelyi 4	Goals	Steffens 4	Olympic Aquatics Stadium, Rio de Janeiro; Referees: Daniel Flahive (AUS), Georgios Stavridis (GRE)

Bronze medal match

19 August 2016; 11:20	Report	Hungary	18–19 (PSO)	Russia	Olympic Aquatics Stadium, Rio de Janeiro; Referees: Diana Dutilh-Dumas (NED), Fillippo Gomez (ITA)
19 August 2016; 11:20	Report	Score by quarters: 3–3, 3–4, 3–1, 3–4 PSO: 6–7			Olympic Aquatics Stadium, Rio de Janeiro; Referees: Diana Dutilh-Dumas (NED), Fillippo Gomez (ITA)
19 August 2016; 11:20	Report	Bujka 3	Goals	Fedotova 5	Olympic Aquatics Stadium, Rio de Janeiro; Referees: Diana Dutilh-Dumas (NED), Fillippo Gomez (ITA)

== Weightlifting ==
Hungary has qualified one male weightlifter for the Rio Olympics by virtue of a top seven national finish at the 2016 European Championships.

Athlete	Event	Snatch		Clean & Jerk		Total	Rank
Athlete	Event	Result	Rank	Result	Rank	Total	Rank
Péter Nagy	Men's +105 kg	193	7	227	10	420	10

== Wrestling ==
Hungary has qualified a total of ten wrestlers for each the following weight classes into the Olympic competition. One of them finished among the top six to book an Olympic spot in the men's Greco-Roman 85 kg at the 2015 World Championships, while four additional licenses were awarded to Hungarian wrestlers, who progressed to the top two finals at the 2016 European Qualification Tournament. Three further wrestlers had claimed the remaining Olympic slots to round out the Hungarian roster at the initial meet of the World Qualification Tournament.

The wrestling team was named to the Olympic roster on June 24, 2016, with London 2012 silver medalist Tamás Lőrincz and Péter Bácsi competing in the ring at their third straight Games.

Key:

- VT – Victory by fall.
- PP – Decision by points – the loser with technical points.
- PO – Decision by points – the loser without technical points.
- ST – Great superiority – the loser without technical points and a margin of victory of at least 8 (Greco-Roman) or 10 (freestyle) points.
- SP – Technical superiority – the loser with technical points and a margin of victory of at least 8 (Greco-Roman) or 10 (freestyle) points.

Men's freestyle

Athlete	Event	Qualification	Round of 16	Quarterfinal	Semifinal	Repechage 1	Repechage 2	Final / BM	
Athlete	Event	Opposition Result	Opposition Result	Opposition Result	Opposition Result	Opposition Result	Opposition Result	Opposition Result	Rank
István Veréb	−86 kg	Bye	Sadulaev (RUS); L 0–4 ^{ST}	Did not advance		Bye	Ceballos (VEN); L 1–3 ^{PP}	Did not advance	13
Dániel Ligeti	−125 kg	Bye	Temengil (PLW); W 4–0 ^{ST}	Berianidze (ARM); L 1–3 ^{PP}	Did not advance				7

Men's Greco-Roman

Athlete	Event	Qualification	Round of 16	Quarterfinal	Semifinal	Repechage 1	Repechage 2	Final / BM	
Athlete	Event	Opposition Result	Opposition Result	Opposition Result	Opposition Result	Opposition Result	Opposition Result	Opposition Result	Rank
Tamás Lőrincz	−66 kg	Bye	Ryu H-s (KOR); L 0–3 ^{PO}	Did not advance					16
Péter Bácsi	−75 kg	Muñoz (COL); W 4–0 ^{ST}	Aleksandrov (BUL); W 4–0 ^{ST}	Mursaliyev (AZE); W 3–0 ^{PO}	Madsen (DEN); L 0–3 ^{PO}	Bye		Abdevali (IRI); L 1–3 ^{PP}	5
Viktor Lőrincz	−85 kg	Manukyan (ARM); W 3–0 ^{PO}	Khatri (IND); W 4–0 ^{ST}	Assakalov (UZB); W 3–1 ^{PP}	Chakvetadze (RUS); L 1–3 ^{PP}	Bye		Kudla (GER); L 1–3 ^{PP}	5
Balázs Kiss	−98 kg	Timchenko (UKR); W 3–0 ^{PO}	Schön (SWE); L 1–3 ^{PP}	Did not advance					9

Women's freestyle

Athlete	Event	Qualification	Round of 16	Quarterfinal	Semifinal	Repechage 1	Repechage 2	Final / BM	
Athlete	Event	Opposition Result	Opposition Result	Opposition Result	Opposition Result	Opposition Result	Opposition Result	Opposition Result	Rank
Marianna Sastin	−63 kg	Trazhukova (RUS); L 0–3 ^{PO}	Did not advance						17
Zsanett Németh	−75 kg	Bye	Manyurova (KAZ); L 1–4 ^{SP}	Did not advance		Bye	Ali (CMR); L 1–3 ^{PP}	Did not advance	10

== See also ==
- Hungary at the 2016 Summer Paralympics
