= Kenya at the 2022 Commonwealth Games =

- Flag of Kenya
- CG code: KEN
- CGA: National Olympic Committee of Kenya
- Website: teamkenya.or.ke

in Birmingham, England 28 July 2022 – 8 August 2022
- Competitors: 123 (63 men and 60 women) in 17 sports
- Flag bearers: Ferdinand Omanyala; Carolina Wanjira
- Medals Ranked 13th: Gold 6 Silver 5 Bronze 10 Total 21

Commonwealth Games appearances (overview)
- 1954; 1958; 1962; 1966; 1970; 1974; 1978; 1982; 1986; 1990; 1994; 1998; 2002; 2006; 2010; 2014; 2018; 2022; 2026; 2030

Kenya competed at the 2022 Commonwealth Games at Birmingham, England from 28 July to 8 August 2022. It was Kenya's 17th appearance at the Games.

Ferdinand Omanyala and Carolina Wanjira were the country's opening ceremony flagbearers.

== Medalists ==
Medal	Name	Sport	Event	Date
Gold	Ferdinand Omurwa	Athletics	Men's 100 m	3 August
Gold	Jackline Chepkoech	Athletics	Women's 3000 m steeplechase	5 August
Gold	Abraham Kibiwot	Athletics	Men's 3000 m steeplechase	6 August
Gold	Mary Moraa	Athletics	Women's 800 m	6 August
Gold	Wycliffe Kinyama	Athletics	Men's 800 m	7 August
Gold	Beatrice Chebet	Athletics	Women's 5000 m	7 August
Silver	Margaret Wangari Muriuki	Athletics	Women's marathon	30 July
Silver	Daniel Simiu Ebenyo	Athletics	Men's 10,000 m	2 August
Silver	Irene Cheptai	Athletics	Women's 10,000 m	3 August
Silver	Timothy Cheruiyot	Athletics	Men's 1500 m	6 August
Silver	Nicholas Kimeli	Athletics	Men's 5000 m	6 August
Bronze	Michael Mugo Githae	Athletics	Men's marathon	30 July
Bronze	Kibiwott Kandie	Athletics	Men's 10,000 m	2 August
Bronze	Sheila Chepkirui	Athletics	Women's 10,000 m	3 August
Bronze	Hellen Kariuki	Para powerlifting	Women's lightweight	4 August
Bronze	Jacob Krop	Athletics	Men's 5000 m	6 August
Bronze	Amos Serem	Athletics	Men's 3000 m steeplechase	6 August
Bronze	Emily Ngii	Athletics	Women's 10,000 metres walk	6 August
Bronze	Wiseman Mukhobe; Mike Nyang'au; William Rayian; Boniface Mweresa; William Mutunga	Athletics	Men's 4 × 400 m relay	7 August
Bronze	Julius Yego	Athletics	Men's javelin throw	7 August
Bronze	Selah Jepleting	Athletics	Women's 5000 m	7 August

== Competitors ==
The following is the list of number of competitors participating at the Games per sport/discipline.

Sport	Men	Women	Total
Athletics	30	17	47
Badminton	1	1	2
3x3 basketball	4	8	12
Beach volleyball	0	2	2
Boxing	2	2	4
Cycling	3	1	4
Hockey	0	18	18
Judo	1	1	2
Lawn bowls	1	1	2
Para powerlifting	0	2	2
Rugby sevens	13	0	13
Squash	1	1	2
Swimming	2	2	4
Table tennis	1	1	2
Triathlon	1	1	2
Weightlifting	2	1	3
Wrestling	1	1	2
Total	63	60	123

== Athletics ==
Kenya selected a squad of six athletes (plus two reserves) for the marathons on 7 April 2022 (officially announced on 21 May 2022). Following the national trials, a squad of forty-three athletes and two more reserves was confirmed on 25 June 2022.

Men
Track & road events

Athlete	Event	Heat		Semifinal		Final	
Athlete	Event	Result	Rank	Result	Rank	Result	Rank
Ferdinand Omurwa	100 m	10.07	2 Q	10.02	1 Q	10.02	1st place, gold medalist(s)
Samuel Imeta	100 m	10.12	6 Q	10.24	10	did not advance	
Mike Nyang'au	200 m	20.82	7 Q	20.90	9	did not advance	
Dan Kiviasi Asamba	200 m	20.76	5 Q	20.99	13	did not advance	
Hesborn Ochieng	200 m	21.30	24 q	21.56	23	did not advance	
Emmanuel Korir	400 m	DQ		did not advance			
William Rayian	400 m	47.08	27	did not advance			
Boniface Mweresa	400 m	45.91	5 Q	45.85	5 Q	44.96	4
Wycliffe Kinyamal	800 m	1:48.15	5 Q	—N/a		1:47.52	1st place, gold medalist(s)
Cornelius Tuwei	800 m	1:48.66	8	—N/a		did not advance	
Elias Ngeny	800 m	1:49.53	12	—N/a		did not advance	
Timothy Cheruiyot	1500 m	3:37.82	2 Q	—N/a		3:30.21	2nd place, silver medalist(s)
Abel Kipsang	1500 m	3:48.63	12 Q	—N/a		3:30.82	4
Nicholas Kimeli	5000 m	—N/a				13:08.19	2nd place, silver medalist(s)
Jacob Krop	5000 m	—N/a				13:08.48	3rd place, bronze medalist(s)
Cornelius Kemboi	5000 m	—N/a				13:32.21	11
Kibiwott Kandie	10,000 m	—N/a				27:20.34	3rd place, bronze medalist(s)
Edward Zakayo	10,000 m	—N/a				27:39.03	4
Daniel Simiu Ebenyo	10,000 m	—N/a				27:11.26	2nd place, silver medalist(s)
Wiseman Were Mukhobe	400 m hurdles	50.03	4 Q	—N/a		50.27	4
William Mutunga	400 m hurdles	49.99	3 Q	—N/a		50.60	5
Amos Serem	3000 m steeplechase	—N/a				8:16.93	3rd place, bronze medalist(s)
Conseslus Kipruto	3000 m steeplechase	—N/a				8:34.96	6
Abraham Kibiwot	3000 m steeplechase	—N/a				8:11.15	1st place, gold medalist(s)
Samwel Imeta; Dan Asamba; Mike Nyang'au; Ferdinand Omanyala; Hesborn Ochieng	4 × 100 m relay	38.92	4 Q	—N/a		DNF	
Wiseman Mukhobe; Mike Nyang'au; William Rayian; Boniface Mweresa; William Mutunga	4 × 400 m relay	3:06.76	5 Q	—N/a		3:02.41	3rd place, bronze medalist(s)
Michael Mugo Githae	Marathon	—N/a				2:13:16	3rd place, bronze medalist(s)
Erick Kiplagat Sang	Marathon	—N/a				DNS	
Jonathon Kipleting Korir	Marathon	—N/a				2:14:06	5
Samuel Gathimba	10,000 m walk	—N/a				39:23.14	5

Field events

Athlete	Event	Final	
Athlete	Event	Distance	Rank
Alex Kiprotich	Javelin throw	77.93	8
Julius Yego	Javelin throw	85.70	3rd place, bronze medalist(s)

Women
Track & road events

Athlete	Event	Heat		Semifinal		Final	
Athlete	Event	Result	Rank	Result	Rank	Result	Rank
Maximila Imali	100 m	11.30	3 Q	11.35	5	did not advance	
Milicent Ndoro	100 m	11.76	5	did not advance			
Maximila Imali	200 m	DNS		did not advance			
Milicent Ndoro	200 m	24.03	3 Q	23.86	6	did not advance	
Mary Moraa	400 m	59.51	7	did not advance			
Veronica Mutua	400 m	53.02	4 q	54.80	8	did not advance	
Mary Moraa	800 m	1:59.22	1 Q	—N/a		1:57.07	1st place, gold medalist(s)
Jarinter Mawia	800 m	2:00.95	4	—N/a		did not advance	
Winny Chebet	1500 m	4:16.11	3 Q	—N/a		4:15.48	12
Edinah Jebitok	1500 m	4:13.84	3 Q	—N/a		4:08.33	9
Selah Jepleting	5000 m	—N/a				14:48.24	3rd place, bronze medalist(s)
Beatrice Chebet	5000 m	—N/a				14:38.21	1st place, gold medalist(s)
Sheila Chepkirui	10,000 m	—N/a				31:09.46	(bronze)
Irene Cheptai	10,000 m	—N/a				30:49.52	(silver)
Jackline Chepkoech	3000 m steeplechase	—N/a				9:15.68	1st place, gold medalist(s)
Milicent Ndoro; Jarinter Mwasya; Veronica Mutua; Mary Moraa	4 × 400 m relay	—N/a				3:32.28	5
Margaret Wangari Muriuki	Marathon	—N/a				2:28:00; PB	2nd place, silver medalist(s)
Emily Ngii	10,000 m walk	—N/a				43:50.86	3rd place, bronze medalist(s)

Field events

Athlete	Event	Qualification		Final	
Athlete	Event	Distance	Rank	Distance	Rank
Sylvia Olero	Discus throw F44/64	—N/a		20.57	8
Lucy Omondi	Hammer throw	48.33	15	did not advance	
Linda Oseso	Hammer throw	51.32	14	did not advance	

== Badminton ==
Badminton Kenya is currently suspended as a consequence of internal election disputes. Following an appeal by NOC-K, Kenya received special permission from the BWF to participate in the Commonwealth Games badminton competition.

Following the selection trials in June 2022, two players were selected to represent Kenya in the competition.

Athlete	Event	Round of 64	Round of 32	Round of 16	Quarterfinal	Semifinal	Final / BM	
Athlete	Event	Opposition Score	Opposition Score	Opposition Score	Opposition Score	Opposition Score	Opposition Score	Rank
Sammy Mdogo Sikoyo	Men's singles	Tang (AUS); L 0 - 2	did not advance					
Saumya Gupta	Women's singles	Bye	Kobygabe (UGA); L 0 - 2	did not advance				
Sammy Mdogo Sikoyo; Saumya Gupta	Mixed doubles	Lubah / Bodha (MRI); L 0 - 2	did not advance					

== 3x3 basketball ==
By virtue of its status as the top Commonwealth African nation in the respective FIBA 3x3 Federation Rankings for men and women (on 1 November 2021), Kenya qualified for both tournaments. On 27 April 2022, it was also confirmed that Kenya received a Bipartite Invitation for the women's wheelchair tournament.

Summary

Team	Event	Preliminary round				Quarterfinal	Semifinal	Final / BM / PM	
Team	Event	Opposition Result	Opposition Result	Opposition Result	Rank	Opposition Result	Opposition Result	Opposition Result	Rank
Kenya men	Men's tournament	Canada; L 12 - 15	Sri Lanka; W 21 - 18	Scotland; L 14 - 15	3 Q	Australia; L 15 - 20	did not advance		
Kenya women	Women's tournament	Sri Lanka; W 21 - 8	Australia; L 15 - 21	Scotland; L 14 - 15	3 Q	England; L 12 - 21	did not advance		
Kenya wheelchair women	Women's tournament	England; L 1 - 20	Canada; L 1 - 17	—N/a	3	—N/a	Did not advance	South Africa; L 5 - 6	6

=== Men's tournament ===
Roster

- Faheem Juma
- George Omondi
- Larry Shavanga
- John Wijass

Group A

Pos	Team	Pld	W	L	PF	PA	PD	Qualification
1	Scotland	3	3	0	52	43	+9	Direct to semi-finals
2	Canada	3	2	1	56	41	+15	Quarter-finals
3	Kenya	3	1	2	47	48	−1	Quarter-finals
4	Sri Lanka	3	0	3	35	58	−23	

Source: Birmingham 2022
Rules for classification: 1) Wins; 2) Head-to-head record; 3) Points scored.

29 July 2022
15:30

Report

Canada	15–12	Kenya
Pts: Gill 5		Pts: Omondi 6

Smithfield

29 July 2022
19:30

Report

Kenya	21–18	Sri Lanka
Pts: Juma 9		Pts: Yogananthan 13

Smithfield

31 July 2022
15:30

Report

Kenya	14–15	Scotland
Pts: Omondi 6		Pts: Murray 7

Smithfield

Quarterfinals

1 August 2022
17:00

Report

Australia	20–15	Kenya
Pts: Wright 8		Pts: Omondi 6

Smithfield

=== Women's tournament ===
Roster

- Victoria Reynolds
- Madina Okot
- Hilda Indasi
- Melissa Otieno

Group A

Pos	Team	Pld	W	L	PF	PA	PD	Qualification
1	Australia	3	3	0	63	26	+37	Direct to semi-finals
2	Scotland	3	2	1	45	40	+5	Quarter-finals
3	Kenya	3	1	2	50	44	+6	Quarter-finals
4	Sri Lanka	3	0	3	15	63	−48	

Source: Birmingham 2022
Rules for classification: 1) Wins; 2) Head-to-head record; 3) Points scored.

29 July 2022
15:30

Report

Kenya	21–8	Sri Lanka
Pts: Indasi, Okot 8		Pts: N.Perera, R.Perera 3

Smithfield

29 July 2022
19:30

Report

Australia	21–15	Kenya
Pts: Scherf 9		Pts: Otieno 5

Smithfield

31 July 2022
15:30

Report

Kenya	14–15	Scotland
Pts: Indasi 6		Pts: Leonard 9

Smithfield

Quarterfinals

1 August 2022
17:30

Report

England	21–12	Kenya
Pts: Jump 8		Pts: Otieno 4

Smithfield

=== Women's wheelchair ===
Roster

- Carolina Wanjira
- Eunice Otieno
- Rahel Alar
- Stella Tiyoy

Group A

Pos	Team	Pld	W	L	PF	PA	PD	Qualification
1	Canada	2	2	0	30	9	+21	Semi-finals
2	England (H)	2	1	1	28	14	+14	Semi-finals
3	Kenya	2	0	2	2	37	−35	5th place match

Source: Birmingham 2022
Rules for classification: 1) Wins; 2) Head-to-head record; 3) Points scored.
(H) Hosts

29 July 2022
15:30

Report

Kenya	1–20	England
Pts: Wanjira 1		Pts: Moore, Atkin 6

Smithfield

30 July 2022
15:30

Report

Canada	17–1	Kenya
Pts: Dandeneau 7		Pts: Alar 1

Smithfield

Fifth place match

2 August 2022
15:00

Report

South Africa	6–5	Kenya
Pts: Moeng 5		Pts: Alar 4

Smithfield

== Beach volleyball ==
Kenya was awarded a Bipartite Invitation for the women's tournament.

Athletes	Event	Preliminary Round				Quarterfinals	Semifinals	Final / BM	Rank
Athletes	Event	Opposition Score	Opposition Score	Opposition Score	Rank	Opposition Score	Opposition Score	Opposition Score	Rank
Brackcides Khadambi; Gaudencia Makokha	Women's	Zaimann / Polley (NZL); L 0 - 2	Melissa / Pavan (CAN); L 0 - 2	Aryee / Katadat (GHA); W 2 - 1	3	did not advance			

=== Women's tournament ===
Group A

Pos	Team	Pld	W	L	Pts	SW	SL	SR	SPW	SPL	SPR	Qualification
1	Humana-Paredes – Pavan (CAN)	3	3	0	6	6	0	MAX	137	73	1.877	Quarterfinals
2	Zeimann – Polley (NZL)	3	2	1	5	4	2	2.000	124	105	1.181	Quarterfinals
3	Khadambi – Makokha (KEN)	3	1	2	4	2	5	0.400	101	134	0.754	Ranking of third-placed teams
4	Aryee – Katadat (GHA)	3	0	3	3	1	6	0.167	86	138	0.623	

Source: birmingham2022.com

Qualified for the Quarterfinals

30 July 2022; 19:00	Zeimann – Polley (NZL)	2–0	Khadambi – Makokha (KEN)	Smithfield
30 July 2022; 19:00	(21–10, 21–19); Report			Smithfield

1 August 2022; 14:30	Humana-Paredes – Pavan (CAN)	2–0	Khadambi – Makokha (KEN)	Smithfield
1 August 2022; 14:30	(21–15, 21–5); Report			Smithfield

3 August 2022; 14:30	Khadambi – Makokha (KEN)	2–1	Aryee – Katadat (GHA)	Smithfield
3 August 2022; 14:30	(16–21, 21–13, 15–12); Report			Smithfield

== Boxing ==
Four boxers were selected for the competition on 4 July 2022.

Athlete	Event	Round of 32	Round of 16	Quarterfinals	Semifinals	Final	
Athlete	Event	Opposition Result	Opposition Result	Opposition Result	Opposition Result	Opposition Result	Rank
Shaffi Hassan	Men's Bantamweight	—N/a	Prasanna (SRI); L 2 - 3	did not advance			
Nicholas Okoth	Men's Featherweight	Allicock (GUY); L 0 - 5	did not advance				
Christine Ongare	Women's Minimumweight	—N/a	—N/a	Dhillon (CAN); L 1 - 4	did not advance		
Elizabeth Andiego	Women's Middleweight	—N/a	Bye	Parker (AUS); L 0 - 5	did not advance		

== Cycling ==
=== Track ===
Time trial

Athlete	Event	Time	Rank
Kennedy Ogada; Peter Mwangi Njoki (pilot)	Men's tandem time trial B	1:20.172	6

=== Mountain Biking ===
Athlete	Event	Time	Rank
Edwin Ndungu	Men's cross-country	LAP	
Nancy Debe	Women's cross-country	LAP	

== Hockey ==
By virtue of its position in the FIH Women's World Ranking (as of 1 February 2022), Kenya qualified for the women's tournament.

Detailed fixtures were released on 9 March 2022. Eighteen players and seven reserves were named on 16 June 2022.

=== Women's tournament ===
Summary

Key:

- FT = After full time
- P = Match decided by penalty-shootout

Team	Event	Preliminary round					Semifinal	Final / BM / PM	
Team	Event	Opposition Result	Opposition Result	Opposition Result	Opposition Result	Rank	Opposition Result	Opposition Result	Rank
Kenya women	Women's tournament	New Zealand; L 0 - 16	Australia; L 0 - 8	Scotland; L 0 - 11	South Africa; L 0 - 15	5	—N/a	Ghana; W 2 - 2 (PSO 3 - 2)	9

Squad

- Quinter Okore (gk)
- Millicent Adhiambo (gk)
- Beatrice Mbugua
- Lynn Mumbi
- Aurelia Opondo
- Joan Anjao
- Moureen Owiti
- Flavia Mutiva
- Caroline Guchu
- Lynn Tamunai Kipsang
- Maureen Okumu
- Alice Owiti
- Eleanor Chebet
- Gilly Okumu
- Jeriah Onsare
- Nichole Odhiambo
- Grace Bwire
- Naomi Kemunto

Reserves: Tracy Karanja, Gaudencia Ochieng, Elsie Jemutai, Vivian Onyango, Rhoda Kuira, Beverly Akoth, Maroline Wabomba

Group play

Pos	Team	Pld	W	D	L	GF	GA	GD	Pts	Qualification
1	Australia	4	4	0	0	16	0	+16	12	Semi-finals
2	New Zealand	4	3	0	1	21	2	+19	9	Semi-finals
3	Scotland	4	2	0	2	15	5	+10	6	Fifth place match
4	South Africa	4	1	0	3	18	13	+5	3	Seventh place match
5	Kenya	4	0	0	4	0	50	−50	0	Ninth place match

Source: Birmingham 2022
Rules for classification: 1) points; 2) number of wins; 3) goal difference; 4) goals scored; 5) head-to-head results.

29 July 2022
09:00

New Zealand	16–0	Kenya
Jaques 8', 30+'; Dickins 12', 28'; Shannon 13', 29', 45+'; Hull 18', 30'; Lukin 25'; Davies 37'; Tynan 43'; Cotter 46', 50'; Merry 53', 56'	Report

Umpires:
Rachel Williams (ENG)
Lelia Sacre (CAN)

30 July 2022
14:00

Australia	8–0	Kenya
Nobbs 5', 12', 60'; Tonkin 5', 32'; Kershaw 15'; Colwill 25'; Stewart 36'	Report

Umpires:
Cathy Wright (WAL)
Katrina Turner (NZL)

1 August 2022
11:00

Scotland	11–0	Kenya
Burnet 3', 45'; Watson 6', 27'; Eadie 7'; Jamieson 11', 42'; Campbell 13'; Costello 15+'; Shields 48'; K. Robertson 56'	Report

Umpires:
Hannah Harrison (ENG)
Rhiannon Murrie (AUS)

2 August 2022
16:00

Kenya	0–15	South Africa
	Report	Du Toit 4', 27', 43', 46', 57'; Lombard 11', 56'; Du Plessis 12', 40', 51', 53'; Hunter 14', 27'; Paton 35'; Coston 60'

Umpires:
Rebecca Woodcock (ENG)
Binish Hayat (PAK)

Ninth place match

5 August 2022
09:00

Ghana	2–2	Kenya
Umaru 26'; Berko 32'	Report	Bwire 5'; Mutiva 58'
Penalties
Umaru (penalty shoot-out scored); Opoku (penalty shoot-out missed); Berko (penalty shoot-out scored); Copson (penalty shoot-out missed); Narkuor (penalty shoot-out missed); Umaru (penalty shoot-out missed)	2–3	(penalty shoot-out missed) Okumu; (penalty shoot-out scored) Chebet; (penalty shoot-out missed) Okumu; (penalty shoot-out scored) Guchu; (penalty shoot-out missed) Owiti; (penalty shoot-out scored) Chebet

Umpires:
Rhiannon Murrie (AUS)
Rebecca Woodcock (ENG)

== Judo ==
Two judoka were selected as of 18 June 2022.

Athlete	Event	Round of 16	Quarterfinals	Semifinals	Repechage	Final/BM	
Athlete	Event	Opposition Result	Opposition Result	Opposition Result	Opposition Result	Opposition Result	Rank
Kalvin Afude	Men's +100 kg	Bye	Perrinne (MRI); L 00 - 10	Did not advance	Dugasse (SEY); L 00 - 10	Did not advance	7
Dianah Kana	Women's +78 kg	Pulamoeng (BOT); W 01 - 00	Adlington (SCO); L 00 - 10	Did not advance	Hawkes (NIR); L 00 - 10	Did not advance	7

== Lawn bowls ==
Athlete	Event	Group Stage					Quarterfinal	Semifinal	Final / BM	
Athlete	Event	Opposition Score	Opposition Score	Opposition Score	Opposition Score	Rank	Opposition Score	Opposition Score	Opposition Score	Rank
Cephas Kimani	Men's Singles	Evans (RSA); L 10 - 21	Jim (COK); L 17 - 21	Wilson (AUS); L 13 - 21	Priaulx (GGY); W 21 - 11	3	did not advance			
Eunice Mbugua	Women's Singles	Ryan (AUS); L 7 - 21	Kos (CAN); W 21 - 16	Beere (GGY); L 16 - 21	—N/a	3	did not advance			

== Para powerlifting ==
Athlete	Event	Result	Rank
Hellen Kariuki	Women's lightweight	98.5	3rd place, bronze medalist(s)
Joyce Njuguna	Women's heavyweight	83.4	5

== Rugby sevens ==
As of 9 November 2021, Kenya qualified for the men's tournament. This was achieved through their positions in the 2018–19 / 2019–20 World Rugby Sevens Series.

The thirteen-man roster was officially named on 12 July 2022.

Summary

Team	Event	Preliminary Round				Quarterfinal / CQ	Semifinal / CS	Final / BM / CF	
Team	Event	Opposition Result	Opposition Result	Opposition Result	Rank	Opposition Result	Opposition Result	Opposition Result	Rank
Kenya men's	Men's tournament	Uganda; W 27 - 14	Jamaica; W 45 - 0	Australia; L 5 - 7	2 Q	New Zealand; L 0 - 31	Scotland; L 12 - 22	—N/a	= 7

=== Men's tournament ===
Roster

- Nelson Oyoo (c)
- Herman Humwa
- Alvin Otieno
- Vincent Onyala
- Bush Mwale
- Kevin Wekesa
- Anthony Omondi
- Johnstone Olindi
- Billy Odhiambo
- Edmund Anya
- Daniel Taabu
- Levy Amunga
- Willy Ambaka

Pool D

Pos	Team	Pld	W	D	L	PF	PA	PD	Pts	Qualification
1	Australia	3	2	1	0	81	17	+64	8	Advance to Quarter-finals
2	Kenya	3	2	0	1	77	21	+56	7	Advance to Quarter-finals
3	Uganda	3	1	1	1	66	39	+27	6	Advance to classification Quarter-finals
4	Jamaica	3	0	0	3	0	147	−147	3	Advance to classification Quarter-finals

Updated to match(es) played on 29 July 2022. Source: Birmingham2022
Rules for classification: 1) Points; 2) Head-to-head result; 3) Point difference; 4) Points scored.

29 July 2022
10:50

Kenya	27–14	Uganda
Try: Olindi (2) 1' m, 12' m Humwa 2' c Odhiambo 4' m Wekesa 14' m Con: Olindi (1/3) 3'; Taabu (0/2)	Report	Try: Kisiga 5' c Wokorach 9' c Con: Wokorach (2/2) 5', 10'

Coventry Stadium, Coventry
Referee: Talal-Azmat Chaudhry (Canada)

29 July 2022
18:58

Kenya	45–0	Jamaica
Try: Oyoo 1' m Onyala 2' c Taabu 6' c Ambaka 7' m Wekesa 9' c Mwale 11' c Otieno 14' c Con: Taabu (2/4) 3', 6'; Olindi (1/1) 9'; Amunga (2/2) 11', 14'	Report

Coventry Stadium, Coventry
Referee: Tevita Rokovereni (Fiji)

30 July 2022
10:50

Australia	7–5	Kenya
Try: Toole 10' c Con: Roache (1/1) 11'; Cards: Nawaqanitawase (yellow card) 1'; Lawson (yellow card) 8'	Report	Try: Otieno 2' m Cards: Mwale (yellow card) 4'

Coventry Stadium, Coventry
Referee: Finlay Brown (Scotland)

Quarterfinals

30 July 2022
21:10

New Zealand	31–0	Kenya
Try: McGarvey-Black 3' c Ware (2) 7' m, 8' c Curry 10' m Collier 12' c Con: McGarvey-Black (3/5) 4', 9', 13'	Report

Coventry Stadium, Coventry
Referee: Morné Ferreira (South Africa)

5th-8th Semifinals

31 July 2022
11:58

Kenya	12–22	Scotland
Try: Oyoo 8' m Taabu 11' c Con: Omondi (1/2) 12'	Report	Try: Edmunds 4' m Barreto 7' m Elms 13' c McCann 14' m Con: Barreto (1/4) 13'

Coventry Stadium, Coventry
Referee: Nick Hogan (New Zealand)

== Squash ==
Athlete	Event	Round of 64	Round of 32	Round of 16	Quarterfinals	Semifinals	Final	
Athlete	Event	Opposition Score	Opposition Score	Opposition Score	Opposition Score	Opposition Score	Opposition Score	Rank
Muqtadir Nimji	Men's singles	Stewart (SCO); L 0 - 3	did not advance					
Khaaliqa Nimji	Women's singles	Best (BAR); L 0 - 3	did not advance					

== Swimming ==
Men

Athlete	Event	Heat		Semifinal		Final	
Athlete	Event	Time	Rank	Time	Rank	Time	Rank
Monyo Maina	100 m freestyle	53.96	48	did not advance			
Monyo Maina	200 m freestyle	1:59.72	32	—N/a		did not advance	
Ridhwan Mohamed	50 m freestyle	24.41	39	did not advance			
Ridhwan Mohamed	100 m freestyle	52.81	38	did not advance			
Ridhwan Mohamed	50 m butterfly	25.92	34	did not advance			

Women

Athlete	Event	Heat		Semifinal		Final	
Athlete	Event	Time	Rank	Time	Rank	Time	Rank
Emily Muteti	50 m freestyle	26.50	19	did not advance			
Emily Muteti	100 m freestyle	58.03	24	did not advance			
Emily Muteti	100 m butterfly	1:02.10	20	did not advance			
Imara Thorpe	50 m freestyle	27.25	29	did not advance			
Imara Thorpe	50 m butterfly	27.92	22	did not advance			
Imara Thorpe	100 m butterfly	1:02.16	21	did not advance			

Mixed

Athlete	Event	Heat		Final	
Athlete	Event	Time	Rank	Time	Rank
Ridhwan Mohamed; Monyo Maina; Emily Muteti; Imara Thorpe	4 × 100 m freestyle relay	3:45.36	8 Q	3:43.33 NR	8
Imara Thorpe; Emily Muteti; Ridhwan Mohamed; Monyo Maina	4 × 100 m medley relay	4:16.66	14	did not advance	

== Table tennis ==
Two players were officially selected as of 8 July 2022.

Singles

Athletes	Event	Group stage			Round of 32	Round of 16	Quarterfinal	Semifinal	Final / BM	
Athletes	Event	Opposition Score	Opposition Score	Rank	Opposition Score	Opposition Score	Opposition Score	Opposition Score	Opposition Score	Rank
Brian Mutua	Men's singles	Yogarajah (MRI); L 2 - 4	Maxwell (BAR); W 4 - 1	2	did not advance					
Jenny Amadi	Women's singles	Patel (RSA); L 0 - 4	Young (JAM); L 1 - 4	3	did not advance					

Doubles

Athletes	Event	Round of 64	Round of 32	Round of 16	Quarterfinal	Semifinal	Final / BM	
Athletes	Event	Opposition Score	Opposition Score	Opposition Score	Opposition Score	Opposition Score	Opposition Score	Rank
Jenny Amadi; Brian Mutua	Mixed doubles	Wu / Yee (FIJ); L 1 - 3	did not advance					

== Triathlon ==
Four triathletes (two per gender) were initially selected on 13 March 2022. Following a formal complaint, a second trials race was held (won by Aisha Nasser). The NOC-K ordered a third iteration as the swimming leg of the second race was not held in open water; Nasser won that race as well.

Individual

Athlete	Event	Swim (750 m)	Trans 1	Bike (20 km)	Trans 2	Run (5 km)	Total	Rank
Joseph Okal	Men's	11:07	1:30	31:48	0:34	19:00	1:03:59	35
Aisha Nasser	Women's	12:31	1:24	36:24	0:44	22:13	1:13:16	30

== Weightlifting ==
Athlete	Event	Weight Lifted		Total	Rank
Athlete	Event	Snatch	Clean & jerk	Total	Rank
Benjamin Ochoma	Men's -55 kg	65 kg	85 kg	150 kg	10
Anthony Masinde	Men's -73 kg	110 kg	140 kg	250 kg	11
Rachael Enock	Women's -64 kg	70 kg	85 kg	155 kg	11

== Wrestling ==
Key:

- VT - Victory by Fall.
- PP - Decision by Points - the loser with technical points.
- PO - Decision by Points - the loser without technical points.

Athlete	Event	Round of 16	Quarterfinal	Semifinal	Repechage	Final / BM	
Athlete	Event	Opposition Result	Opposition Result	Opposition Result	Opposition Result	Opposition Result	Rank
Mathayo Mahabila	Men's -74 kg	Hawkins (NZL); L 3 - 8	did not advance				
Sophia Ayieta	Women's -57 kg	Bye	Adekuoroye (NGR); L 0 - 10	Did not advance	Ayo (UGA); W 11 - 0	Taylor (CAN); L 0 - 4	5
