= Athletics at the 2022 Commonwealth Games =

Event at the 2022 Commonwealth Games

- Venue: Alexander Stadium (track and field); Smithfield (marathon start); Victoria Square (marathon finish)
- Dates: 30 July−7 August 2022
- Competitors: 905 from 68 nations

Athletics was one of the core sports that was held at the 2022 Commonwealth Games in Birmingham, England. As a founding sport, athletics had appeared consistently since its introduction at the 1911 Inter-Empire Games, the recognized precursor to the Commonwealth Games.

The competition was split in two parts:the four marathon events (including the wheelchair marathon) were scheduled to the day 30 July and the other 54 events were held between 2 and 7 August 2022, spread across 58 events (including 10 para athletics events).

== Schedule ==
The competition schedule was as follows:

| Qualifying / Heats | ½ | Semi-finals | F | Final |

Men
| Date Event | Sat 30 | Tue 2 | | Wed 3 | | | Thu 4 | | Fri 5 | | Sat 6 | | Sun 7 | |
| Session → | M | M | E | M | E | | M | E | M | E | M | E | M | E |
|---|---|---|---|---|---|---|---|---|---|---|---|---|---|---|
| 100 m | | H | | | ½ | F | | | | | | | | |
| 100 m (T12) | | | | H | | | | F | | | | | | |
| 100 m (T38) | | | | | F | | | | | | | | | |
| 100 m (T47) | | | F | | | | | | | | | | | |
| 200 m | | | | | | | H | | | ½ | | F | | |
| 400 m | | | | H | | | | | | ½ | | | F | |
| 800 m | | | | H | | | | | | | | | | F |
| 1500 m | | | | | | | H | | | | F | | | |
| 1500 m (T54) | | | | H | | | | | | F | | | | |
| 5000 m | | | | | | | | | | | | F | | |
| 10,000 m | | | F | | | | | | | | | | | |
| 110 m hurdles | | | H | | | | | F | | | | | | |
| 400 m hurdles | | | H | | | | | | | | | F | | |
| 3000 m steeplechase | | | | | | | | | | | F | | | |
| 4 × 100 m relay | | | | | | | | | | | H | | F | |
| 4 × 400 m relay | | | | | | | | | H | | | | | F |
| Marathon | F | | | | | | | | | | | | | |
| Marathon (T54) | F | | | | | | | | | | | | | |
| 10,000 m walk | | | | | | | | | | | | | F | |
| High jump | | | Q | | F | | | | | | | | | |
| Pole vault | | | | | | | | | | | | F | | |
| Long jump | | Q | | | | | | F | | | | | | |
| Triple jump | | | | | | | | | | | | | F | |
| Shot put | | | | | | | | | | F | | | | |
| Discus throw | | Q | | | | | | F | | | | | | |
| Discus throw (F44)/(F64) | | | | | F | | | | | | | | | |
| Hammer throw | | | | | | | | | | | F | | | |
| Javelin throw | | | | | | | | | | | | | | F |
| Decathlon | | | | | | | F | | | | | | | |

Women
| Date Event | Sat 30 | Tue 2 | | Wed 3 | | | Thu 4 | | Fri 5 | | Sat 6 | | Sun 7 | |
| Session → | M | M | E | M | E | | M | E | M | E | M | E | M | E |
|---|---|---|---|---|---|---|---|---|---|---|---|---|---|---|
| 100 m | | H | | | ½ | F | | | | | | | | |
| 100 m (T34) | | | F | | | | | | | | | | | |
| 100 m (T38) | | | F | | | | | | | | | | | |
| 200 m | | | | | | | H | | | ½ | | F | | |
| 400 m | | | | H | | | | | | ½ | | | F | |
| 800 m | | H | | | | | | ½ | | | | F | | |
| 1500 m | | | | | | | | | H | | | | | F |
| 1500 m (T54) | | H | | | | | | F | | | | | | |
| 5000 m | | | | | | | | | | | | | | F |
| 10,000 m | | | | | F | | | | | | | | | |
| 100 m hurdles | | | | | | | | | H | | | | F | |
| 400 m hurdles | | | | | | | | H | | | | F | | |
| 3000 m steeplechase | | | | | | | | | | F | | | | |
| 4 × 100 m relay | | | | | | | | | | | H | | F | |
| 4 × 400 m relay | | | | | | | | | | | | | | F |
| Marathon | F | | | | | | | | | | | | | |
| Marathon (T54) | F | | | | | | | | | | | | | |
| 10,000 m walk | | | | | | | | | | | F | | | |
| High jump | | | | | | | Q | | | | F | | | |
| Pole vault | | | F | | | | | | | | | | | |
| Long jump | | | | | | | | | Q | | | | | F |
| Triple jump | | | | Q | | | | | | F | | | | |
| Shot put | | | | | F | | | | | | | | | |
| Shot put (F57) | | | | | | | | | | | F | | | |
| Discus throw | | | F | | | | | | | | | | | |
| Discus throw (F44)/(F64) | | | | | | | | F | | | | | | |
| Hammer throw | | | | | | | | | | | | F | | |
| Javelin throw | | | | | | | | | | | | | F | |
| Heptathlon | | F | | | | | | | | | | | | |

== Venue ==
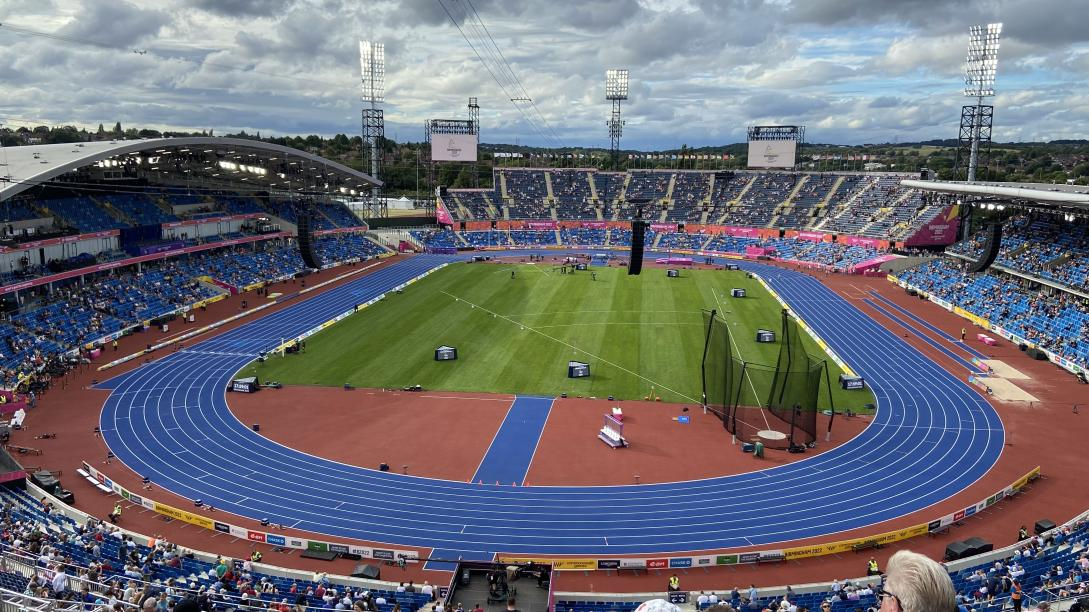
Alexander Stadium during the athletics events at the 2022 Commonwealth Games

Track and field events (including the race walks events start and the finish) were held at the Alexander Stadium, which was also the chosen venue for the opening and closing ceremonies. The marathons were held along a course that passed through streets in the city centre and famous locations including Smithfield / Victoria Square) and Bournville.

== Qualification ==
=== Race walks ===
In addition to the variations that traditionally occur for EAD events, there was a change in the athletics program in relation to the Gold Coast 2018, which was the reduction of the distance of race walking events from 20 km to 10 km.The athletes entered for the 10 km march had to meet the following Minimum Participation Standards between 1 January 2021 and 27 June 2022:

- Men – 44:00 (or 1:30:00 over 20 kilometres)
- Women – 51:00 (or 1:45:00 over 20 kilometres)

All selections were made from nations' open allocation quotas.

=== Parasport ===
A total of up to 96 para athletes (48 per gender) qualified to compete at the Games. Nations may earn three quotas per event, allocated as follows:

- Athletes in the World Para Athletics (WPA) World Rankings (for performances between 31 December 2020 and 25 April 2022).
- Recipients of a CGF/WPA Bipartite Invitation.

== Medal summary ==
=== Medal table ===
* Host nation (England)

| Rank | CGA | Gold | Silver | Bronze | Total |
|---|---|---|---|---|---|
| 1 | Australia | 10 | 10 | 5 | 25 |
| 2 | England* | 8 | 14 | 12 | 34 |
| 3 | Kenya | 6 | 5 | 9 | 20 |
| 4 | Jamaica | 6 | 5 | 2 | 13 |
| 5 | Nigeria | 5 | 1 | 3 | 9 |
| 6 | Canada | 4 | 1 | 2 | 7 |
| 7 | Uganda | 3 | 0 | 1 | 4 |
| 8 | Scotland | 2 | 2 | 4 | 8 |
| 9 | New Zealand | 2 | 2 | 2 | 6 |
| 10 | Trinidad and Tobago | 2 | 1 | 0 | 3 |
| 11 | Wales | 2 | 0 | 1 | 3 |
| 12 | India | 1 | 4 | 3 | 8 |
| 13 | South Africa | 1 | 2 | 2 | 5 |
| 14 | Barbados | 1 | 1 | 1 | 3 |
| 15 | Bahamas | 1 | 1 | 0 | 2 |
| 15 | Grenada | 1 | 1 | 0 | 2 |
| 17 | British Virgin Islands | 1 | 0 | 0 | 1 |
| 17 | Pakistan | 1 | 0 | 0 | 1 |
| 17 | Zambia | 1 | 0 | 0 | 1 |
| 20 | Northern Ireland | 0 | 2 | 0 | 2 |
| 21 | Sri Lanka | 0 | 1 | 1 | 2 |
| 22 | Botswana | 0 | 1 | 0 | 1 |
| 22 | Cameroon | 0 | 1 | 0 | 1 |
| 22 | Dominica | 0 | 1 | 0 | 1 |
| 22 | Saint Lucia | 0 | 1 | 0 | 1 |
| 22 | Tanzania | 0 | 1 | 0 | 1 |
| 27 | Namibia | 0 | 0 | 3 | 3 |
| 28 | Ghana | 0 | 0 | 2 | 2 |
| 29 | Bermuda | 0 | 0 | 1 | 1 |
| 29 | Cyprus | 0 | 0 | 1 | 1 |
| 29 | Fiji | 0 | 0 | 1 | 1 |
| 29 | Guernsey | 0 | 0 | 1 | 1 |
| Totals (32 entries) | | 58 | 58 | 57 | 173 |

=== Men ===
| Event | Gold | | Silver | | Bronze | |
|---|---|---|---|---|---|---|
| 100 metres | Ferdinand Omanyala; Kenya | 10.02 | Akani Simbine; South Africa | 10.13 | Yupun Abeykoon; Sri Lanka | 10.14 |
| 200 metres | Jereem Richards; Trinidad and Tobago | 19.80 GR, PB | Zharnel Hughes; England | 20.12 SB | Joseph Amoah; Ghana | 20.49 |
| 400 metres | Muzala Samukonga; Zambia | 44.66 NR | Matthew Hudson-Smith; England | 44.81 | Jonathan Jones; Barbados | 44.89 |
| 800 metres | Wyclife Kinyamal; Kenya | 1:47.52 | Peter Bol; Australia | 1:47.66 | Ben Pattison; England | 1:48.25 |
| 1500 metres | Oliver Hoare; Australia | 3:30.12 GR, PB | Timothy Cheruiyot; Kenya | 3:30.21 SB | Jake Wightman; Scotland | 3:30.53 |
| 5000 metres | Jacob Kiplimo; Uganda | 13:08.08 SB | Nicholas Kimeli; Kenya | 13:08.19 | Jacob Krop; Kenya | 13:08.48 |
| 10,000 metres | Jacob Kiplimo; Uganda | 27:09.19 GR SB | Daniel Ebenyo; Kenya | 27:11.26 PB | Kibiwott Kandie; Kenya | 27:20.34 PB |
| 110 metres hurdles | Rasheed Broadbell; Jamaica | 13.08 GR PB | Shane Brathwaite; Barbados | 13.30 SB | Andrew Pozzi; England | 13.37 |
| 400 metres hurdles | Kyron McMaster; British Virgin Islands | 48.93 | Jaheel Hyde; Jamaica | 49.78 | Alastair Chalmers; Guernsey | 49.97 |
| 3000 metres steeplechase | Abraham Kibiwot; Kenya | 8:11.15 | Avinash Sable; India | 8:11.20 PB | Amos Serem; Kenya | 8:16.83 |
| 4 × 100 metres relay | England; Jona Efoloko; Zharnel Hughes; Nethaneel Mitchell-Blake; Ojie Edoburun | 38.35 SB | Trinidad and Tobago; Jerod Elcock; Eric Harrison Jr. Kion Benjamin; Kyle Greaux | 38.70 SB | Nigeria; Udodi Onwuzurike; Favour Ashe; Alaba Akintola; Raymond Ekevwo | 38.81 |
| 4 × 400 metres relay | Trinidad and Tobago; Dwight St. Hillaire; Asa Guevara; Machel Cedenio; Jereem Richards | 3:01.29 | Botswana; Leungo Scotch; Zibane Ngozi; Anthony Pesela; Bayapo Ndori | 3:01.85 | Kenya; Wiseman Mukhobe; Mike Nyang'au; William Rayian; Boniface Mweresa | 3:02.41 SB |
| Marathon | Victor Kiplangat; Uganda | 2:10:55 | Alphonce Simbu; Tanzania | 2:12:29 | Michael Githae; Kenya | 2:13:16 |
| 10,000 metres walk | Evan Dunfee; Canada | 38:36.37 GR, PB | Declan Tingay; Australia | 38:42.33 PB | Sandeep Kumar; India | 38:49.21 PB |
| High jump | Hamish Kerr; New Zealand | 2.25 m | Brandon Starc; Australia | 2.25 m | Tejaswin Shankar; India | 2.22 m |
| Pole vault | Kurtis Marschall; Australia | 5.70 m | Adam Hague; England | 5.55 m =SB | Harry Coppell; England | 5.50 m |
| Long jump | LaQuan Nairn; Bahamas | 8.08 m | Murali Sreeshankar; India | 8.08 m | Jovan van Vuuren; South Africa | 8.06 m |
| Triple jump | Eldhose Paul; India | 17.03 m w | Abdulla Aboobacker; India | 17.02 m | Jah-Nhai Perinchief; Bermuda | 16.92 m |
| Shot put | Tom Walsh; New Zealand | 22.26 m | Jacko Gill; New Zealand | 21.90 m PB | Scott Lincoln; England | 20.57 m |
| Discus throw | Matthew Denny; Australia | 67.26 m PB | Lawrence Okoye; England | 64.99 m | Traves Smikle; Jamaica | 64.58 m |
| Hammer throw | Nick Miller; England | 76.43 m | Ethan Katzberg; Canada | 76.36 m | Alexandros Poursanidis; Cyprus | 73.97 m |
| Javelin throw | Arshad Nadeem; Pakistan | 90.18 m GR, NR | Anderson Peters; Grenada | 88.64 m | Julius Yego; Kenya | 85.70 m SB |
| Decathlon | Lindon Victor; Grenada | 8233 pts | Daniel Golubovic; Australia | 8197 pts SB | Cedric Dubler; Australia | 8030 pts |

==== Para Sport ====
| Event | Gold | | Silver | | Bronze | |
|---|---|---|---|---|---|---|
| 100 metres (T12) | Ndodomzi Ntutu; South Africa | 10.83 | Zachary Shaw; England | 10.90 | Ananias Shikongo; Namibia | 10.95 |
| 100 metres (T38) | Evan O'Hanlon; Australia | 11.24 GR SB | Charl du Toit; South Africa | 11.54 GR SB | Zachary Gingras; Canada | 11.65 |
| 100 metres (T47) | Emmanuel Oyinbo-Coker; England | 10.94 GR PB | Jaydon Page; Australia | 11.10 | Ola Abidogun; England | 11.14 PB |
| 1500 metres (T54) | Nathan Maguire; England | 3:11.83 | Daniel Sidbury; England | 3:12.15 | Samuel Carter; Australia | 3:12.82 |
| Marathon (T54) | John Charles Smith; England | 1:41:15 | Sean Frame; Scotland | 1:45:49 SB | Simon Lawson; England | 1:45:49 |
| Discus throw (F44)/(F64) | Aled Davies; Wales | 51.39 m | Palitha Bandara; Sri Lanka | 44.20 m PB | Harrison Walsh; Wales | 54.76 m |

=== Women ===
| Event | Gold | | Silver | | Bronze | |
|---|---|---|---|---|---|---|
| 100 metres | Elaine Thompson-Herah; Jamaica | 10.95 | Julien Alfred; Saint Lucia | 11.01 | Daryll Neita; England | 11.07 |
| 200 metres | Elaine Thompson-Herah; Jamaica | 22.02 GR | Favour Ofili; Nigeria | 22.51 | Christine Mboma; Namibia | 22.80 |
| 400 metres | Sada Williams; Barbados | 49.90 GR | Victoria Ohuruogu; England | 50.72 PB | Jodie Williams; England | 51.26 SB |
| 800 metres | Mary Moraa; Kenya | 1:57.07 | Keely Hodgkinson; England | 1:57.40 | Laura Muir; Scotland | 1:57.87 SB |
| 1500 metres | Laura Muir; Scotland | 4:02.75 | Ciara Mageean; Northern Ireland | 4:04.14 SB | Abbey Caldwell; Australia | 4:04.79 |
| 5000 metres | Beatrice Chebet; Kenya | 14:38.21 SB | Eilish McColgan; Scotland | 14:42.14 SB | Selah Busieni; Kenya | 14:48.24 PB |
| 10,000 metres | Eilish McColgan; Scotland | 30:48.60 GR | Irene Chepet Cheptai; Kenya | 30:49.52 SB | Sheila Chepkirui; Kenya | 31:09.46 SB |
| 100 metres hurdles | Tobi Amusan; Nigeria | 12.30 GR | Devynne Charlton; Bahamas | 12.58 | Cindy Sember; England | 12.59 |
| 400 metres hurdles | Janieve Russell; Jamaica | 54.14 | Shiann Salmon; Jamaica | 54.47 | Zeney van der Walt; South Africa | 54.47 PB |
| 3000 metres steeplechase | Jackline Chepkoech; Kenya | 9:15.68 GR, PB | Elizabeth Bird; England | 9:17.79 PB | Peruth Chemutai; Uganda | 9:23.24 |
| 4 × 100 metres relay | England; Asha Philip; Imani-Lara Lansiquot; Bianca Williams; Daryll Neita | 42.41 SB | Jamaica; Kemba Nelson; Natalliah Whyte; Remona Burchell; Elaine Thompson-Herah | 43.08 | Australia; Ella Connolly; Bree Masters; Jacinta Beecher; Naa Anang | 43.16 |
| 4 × 400 metres relay | Canada; Natassha McDonald; Aiyanna Stiverne; Micha Powell; Kyra Constantine | 3:25.84 | Jamaica; Shiann Salmon; Junelle Bromfield; Roneisha McGregor; Natoya Goule | 3:26.93 | Scotland; Zoey Clark; Beth Dobbin; Jill Cherry; Nicole Yeargin | 3:30.15 SB |
| Marathon | Jessica Stenson; Australia | 2:27:31 SB | Margaret Muriuki; Kenya | 2:28:00 PB | Helalia Johannes; Namibia | 2:28:39 SB |
| 10,000 metres walk | Jemima Montag; Australia | 42:34.30 GR, PB | Priyanka Goswami; India | 43:38.83 PB | Emily Wamusyi Ngii; Kenya | 43:50.86 AR, PB |
| High jump | Lamara Distin; Jamaica | 1.95 m | Eleanor Patterson; Australia | 1.92 m | Kimberly Williamson; Jamaica | 1.92 m |
| Pole vault | Nina Kennedy; Australia | 4.60 m | Molly Caudery; England | 4.45 m | Imogen Ayris; New Zealand | 4.45 m SB |
| Long jump | Ese Brume; Nigeria | 7.00 m GR | Brooke Buschkuehl; Australia | 6.95 m | Deborah Acquah; Ghana | 6.94 m PB |
| Triple jump | Shanieka Ricketts; Jamaica | 14.94 m GR, SB | Thea LaFond; Dominica | 14.39 m | Naomi Metzger; England | 14.37 m |
| Shot put | Sarah Mitton; Canada | 19.03 m | Danniel Thomas-Dodd; Jamaica | 18.98 m | Maddison-Lee Wesche; New Zealand | 18.84 m |
| Discus throw | Chioma Onyekwere; Nigeria | 61.70 m SB | Jade Lally; England | 58.42 m | Obiageri Amaechi; Nigeria | 56.99 m |
| Hammer throw | Camryn Rogers; Canada | 74.08 m | Julia Ratcliffe; New Zealand | 69.63 m | Jillian Weir; Canada | 67.35 m |
| Javelin throw | Kelsey-Lee Barber; Australia | 64.34 m | Mackenzie Little; Australia | 64.27 m PB | Annu Rani; India | 60.00 m |
| Heptathlon | Katarina Johnson-Thompson; England | 6377 pts SB | Kate O'Connor; Northern Ireland | 6233 pts SB | Jade O'Dowda; England | 6212 pts |

==== Para Sport ====
| Event | Gold | | Silver | | Bronze | |
|---|---|---|---|---|---|---|
| 100 metres (T34) | Hannah Cockroft; England | 16.84 GR | Kare Adenegan; England | 17.79 SB | Fabienne André; England | 19.58 |
| 100 metres (T38) | Olivia Breen; Wales | 12.83 PB | Sophie Hahn; England | 13.09 | Rhiannon Clarke; Australia | 13.13 |
| 1500 metres (T54) | Madison de Rozario; Australia | 3:53.03 | Angela Ballard; Australia | 3:53.30 | Samantha Kinghorn; Scotland | 3:53.38 |
| Marathon (T54) | Madison de Rozario; Australia | 1:56:00 GR | Eden Rainbow-Cooper; England | 1:59:45 PB | Not awarded (only 4 entries) | |
| Shot put (F57) | Eucharia Iyiazi; Nigeria | 10.03 GR, SB | Arlette Mawe Fokoa; Cameroon | 9.38 PB | Ugochi Alam; Nigeria | 9.30 |
| Discus throw (F44)/(F64) | Goodness Nwachukwu; Nigeria | 36.56 m WR, GR | Sarah Edmiston; Australia | 34.96 m | Naibili Vatunisolo; Fiji | 23.70 m PB |

== Participating nations ==
There were 68 participating Commonwealth Games Associations (CGA's) in athletics with a total of 905 (494 men and 411 women) athletes. The number of athletes a nation entered is in parentheses beside the name of the country. Brunei, Falkland Islands, Norfolk Island and Niue did not enter any athletes.

- Anguilla (4)
- Antigua and Barbuda (5)
- Australia (84)
- Bahamas (11)
- Bangladesh (5)
- Barbados (9)
- Belize (5)
- Bermuda (5)
- Botswana (17)
- British Virgin Islands (9)
- Cameroon (8)
- Canada (38)
- Cayman Islands (4)
- Cook Islands (1)
- Cyprus (11)
- Dominica (7)
- England (93)
- Eswatini (5)
- Fiji (3)
- The Gambia (7)
- Ghana (14)
- Gibraltar (2)
- Grenada (8)
- Guernsey (5)
- Guyana (10)
- India (42)
- Isle of Man (7)
- Jamaica (49)
- Jersey (3)
- Kenya (48)
- Kiribati (1)
- Lesotho (11)
- Malawi (3)
- Malaysia (8)
- Maldives (3)
- Malta (6)
- Mauritius (6)
- Montserrat (5)
- Mozambique (3)
- Namibia (12)
- Nauru (3)
- New Zealand (17)
- Nigeria (38)
- Northern Ireland (12)
- Pakistan (5)
- Papua New Guinea (18)
- Rwanda (4)
- Saint Helena (2)
- Saint Kitts and Nevis (4)
- Saint Lucia (7)
- Saint Vincent and the Grenadines (6)
- Samoa (9)
- Scotland (33)
- Seychelles (6)
- Sierra Leone (8)
- Singapore (14)
- Solomon Islands (6)
- South Africa (35)
- Sri Lanka (7)
- Tanzania (8)
- Tonga (2)
- Trinidad and Tobago (23)
- Turks and Caicos Islands (7)
- Tuvalu (1)
- Uganda (17)
- Vanuatu (4)
- Wales (24)
- Zambia (6)
