= Uganda at the 2022 Commonwealth Games =

- Flag of Uganda
- CGF code: UGA
- CGA: Commonwealth Games Association Uganda
- Website: nocuganda.org

in Birmingham, England 28 July 2022 – 8 August 2022
- Competitors: 72 (37 men and 35 women) in 12 sports
- Flag bearers: Michael Wokorach; Peace Proscovia
- Medals Ranked 16th: Gold 3 Silver 0 Bronze 2 Total 5

Commonwealth Games appearances (overview)
- 1954; 1958; 1962; 1966; 1970; 1974; 1978; 1982; 1986; 1990; 1994; 1998; 2002; 2006; 2010; 2014; 2018; 2022; 2026; 2030

Uganda competed at the 2022 Commonwealth Games in Birmingham, England between 28 July and 8 August 2022. It was Uganda's sixteenth appearance at the Games.

Michael Wokorach and Peace Proscovia were the country's flagbearers during the opening ceremony.

== Medalists ==
Medal	Name	Sport	Event	Date
Gold	Victor Kiplangat	Athletics	Men's marathon	30 July
Gold	Jacob Kiplimo	Athletics	Men's 10,000 m	2 August
Gold	Jacob Kiplimo	Athletics	Men's 5000 m	6 August
Bronze	Peruth Chemutai	Athletics	Women's 3000 m steeplechase	5 August
Bronze	Teddy Nakimuli	Boxing	Women's light flyweight	6 August

== Competitors ==
The following is the list of number of competitors participating at the Games per sport/discipline.

Sport	Men	Women	Total
Athletics	7	9	16
Badminton	4	4	8
Boxing	5	1	6
Cycling	1	1	2
Netball	—	12	12
Para powerlifting	1	0	1
Rugby sevens	13	0	13
Squash	2	0	2
Swimming	2	3	5
Table tennis	0	4	4
Weightlifting	1	0	1
Wrestling	1	1	2
Total	37	35	72

== Athletics ==
Men
Track and road events

Athlete	Event	Heat		Semifinal		Final	
Athlete	Event	Result	Rank	Result	Rank	Result	Rank
Fred Masisa	100 m (T12)	12.26	4	—		did not advance	
Haron Adoli	400 m	46.38	2 Q	45.80	1 Q	45.62	5
Tom Dradriga	800 m	1:51.40	5	—		Did not advance	
Abu Mayanja	1500 m	3:46.56	8	—		Did not advance	
Emmanuel Otim	1500 m	3:51.35	9	—		Did not advance	
Jacob Kiplimo	5000 m	—				13:08.08	1st place, gold medalist(s)
Jacob Kiplimo	10,000 m	—				27:09.19	(gold)
Victor Kiplangat	Marathon	—				2:10:55	1st place, gold medalist(s)

Women
Track and road events

Athlete	Event	Heat		Semifinal		Final	
Athlete	Event	Result	Rank	Result	Rank	Result	Rank
Jacent Nyamahunge	100 m	11.53	3 Q	11.58	8	did not advance	
Jacent Nyamahunge	200 m	24.07	3 Q	23.86	5	Did not advance	
Leni Shida	400 m	53.65	3 Q	53.77	7	Did not advance	
Halimah Nakaayi	800 m	1:59.35	2 Q	—		2:01.17	7
Winnie Nanyondo	1500 m	4:16.04	1 Q	—		4:05.68	6
Sarah Chelangat	5000 m	—				15:07.79	6
Stella Chesang	5000 m	—				15:19.01	9
Rachael Chebet	10,000 m	—				32:30.95	10
Stella Chesang	10,000 m	—				31:14.14	4
Peruth Chemutai	3000 m steeplechase	—				9:23.24	3rd place, bronze medalist(s)
Linet Chebet	Marathon	—				2:38:32	10

== Badminton ==
By virtue of its position in the combined BWF World Ranking (as of 1 February 2022), Uganda qualified for the mixed team event. Eight players were selected as of 11 July 2022.

Singles

Athlete	Event	Round of 64	Round of 32	Round of 16	Quarterfinal	Semifinal	Final / BM	
Athlete	Event	Opposition Score	Opposition Score	Opposition Score	Opposition Score	Opposition Score	Opposition Score	Rank
Friday Attama	Men's singles	Karunaratne (SRI); L (6–21, 6–21)	Did not advance					
Brian Kasirye	Men's singles	Bye	Mulenga (ZAM); L (19–21, 21–14, 14–21)	Did not advance				
Daniel Wanagaliya	Men's singles	King (BAR); W (21–13, 21–10)	Kidambi (IND); L (9–21, 9–21)	Did not advance				
Husina Kobugabe	Women's singles	Siamupangila (ZAM); W (21–9, 21–8)	Gupta (KEN); W (21–17, 21–10)	Sindhu (IND); L (10–21, 9–21)	Did not advance			
Justine Naluwooza	Women's singles	Laurens Jordaan (RSA); L (19–21, 10–21)	Did not advance					

Doubles

Athlete	Event	Round of 64	Round of 32	Round of 16	Quarterfinal	Semifinal	Final / BM	
Athlete	Event	Opposition Score	Opposition Score	Opposition Score	Opposition Score	Opposition Score	Opposition Score	Rank
Brian Kasirye; Daniel Wanagaliya	Men's doubles	—	Bye	C Mulenga & K Mulenga (ZAM); W (21–15, 21–15)	Chia & Soh (MAS); L (6-21, 12-21)	did not advance		
Friday Attama; Kenneth Mwambu	Men's doubles	—	Abela & Cassar (MLT); L (10–21, 18–21)	Did not advance				
Husina Kobugabe; Fadilah Moahmed Rafi	Women's doubles	—	Bye	Bodha & Dookhee (MRI); W (21–19, 21–19)	Birch & Smith (ENG); L (6-21, 4-21)	did not advance		
Sharifah Wanyana; Justine Naluwooza	Women's doubles	—	Leung & Mungrah (MRI); L (21–16, 18–21, 15–21)	Did not advance				
Brian Kasirye; Fadilah Mohamed Rafi	Mixed doubles	Bye	Lin & Somerville (AUS); L (10–21, 6–21)	Did not advance				
Daniel Wanagaliya; Husina Kobugabe	Mixed doubles	N Ramdhani & P Ramdhani (GUY); W (21–18, 21–10)	B Chater & V Chater (FLK); W (21–13, 21–7)	Ellis & Smith (ENG); L (5–21, 7–21)	Did not advance			
Friday Attama; Sharifah Wanyana	Mixed doubles	Bye	Alphous & Nantuo (GHA); W (21–17, 17–21, 21–14)	Hall & MacPherson (SCO); L (5–21, 6–21)	Did not advance			
Kenneth Mwambu; Justine Naluwooza	Mixed doubles	Bye	Pham & Yu (AUS); L (6–21, 7–21)	Did not advance				

Mixed team

Summary

Team	Event	Group stage				Quarterfinal	Semifinal	Final / BM	
Team	Event	Opposition Score	Opposition Score	Opposition Score	Rank	Opposition Score	Opposition Score	Opposition Score	Rank
Uganda	Mixed team	Canada; L 0–5	Scotland; L 1–4	Maldives; W 4–1	3	did not advance			

Squad

- Brian Kasirye
- Israel Wanagaliya
- Friday Attama
- Kenneth Mwambu
- Husna Kobugabe
- Tracy Naluwooza
- Fadilah Mohamed Rafi
- Sharifah Wanyana

Group stage

Pos	Team	Pld	W	L	MF	MA	MD	GF	GA	GD	PF	PA	PD	Pts	Qualification
1	Canada	3	3	0	13	2	+11	26	4	+22	610	319	+291	3	Knockout stage
2	Scotland	3	2	1	11	4	+7	22	8	+14	562	365	+197	2	Knockout stage
3	Uganda	3	1	2	5	10	−5	11	21	−10	416	597	−181	1	
4	Maldives	3	0	3	1	14	−13	3	29	−26	344	651	−307	0	

Source: BWF

Canada
5
National Exhibition Centre, Court 3
29 July 2022, 14:00 UTC+1

Uganda
0

			1	2	3
1	(Canada) (Uganda)	Ty Alexander Lindeman / Josephine Wu; Daniel Wanagaliya / Fadilah Mohamed Rafi	21; 13	21; 5
2	(Canada) (Uganda)	Brian Yang; Brian Kasirye	21; 12	21; 14
3	(Canada) (Uganda)	Michelle Li; Husina Kobugabe	21; 8	21; 8
4	(Canada) (Uganda)	Adam Dong / Nyl Yakura; Brian Kasirye / Daniel Wanagaliya	21; 2	21; 9
5	(Canada) (Uganda)	Rachel Honderich / Kristen Tsai; Husina Kobugabe / Fadilah Mohamed Rafi	21; 6	21; 10

Scotland
4
National Exhibition Centre, Court 4
30 July 2022, 09:00 UTC+1

Uganda
1

			1	2	3
1	(Scotland) (Uganda)	Christopher Grimley / Eleanor O'Donnell; Daniel Wanagaliya / Husina Kobugabe	21; 7	21; 7
2	(Scotland) (Uganda)	Callum Smith; Brian Kasirye	11; 21	19; 21
3	(Scotland) (Uganda)	Kirsty Gilmour; Fadilah Mohamed Rafi	21; 7	21; 11
4	(Scotland) (Uganda)	Adam Hall / Alexander Dunn; Brian Kasirye / Daniel Wanagaliya	21; 8	21; 5
5	(Scotland) (Uganda)	Ciara Torrance / Julie MacPherson; Husina Kobugabe / Tracy Naluwooza	21; 7	21; 4

Maldives
1
National Exhibition Centre, Court 4
30 July 2022, 19:00 UTC+1

Uganda
4

			1	2	3
1	(Maldives) (Uganda)	Zayan Zaki; Brian Kasirye	4; 21	4; 21
2	(Maldives) (Uganda)	Aminath Nabeeha Abdul Razzaq; Fadilah Mohamed Rafi	20; 22	17; 21
3	(Maldives) (Uganda)	Ahmed Nibal / Ajfan Rasheed; Brian Kasirye / Daniel Wanagaliya	14; 21	21; 14	15; 21
4	(Maldives) (Uganda)	Aminath Nabeeha Abdul Razzaq / Fathimath Nabaaha Abdul Razzaq; Husina Kobugabe / Fadilah Mohamed Rafi	17; 21	17; 21
5	(Maldives) (Uganda)	Zayan Zaki / Fathimath Nabaaha Abdul Razzaq; Daniel Wanagaliya / Husina Kobugabe	18; 21	21; 14	21; 14

== Boxing ==
As of 29 June 2022, six boxers will take part in the competition.

Athlete	Event	Round of 32	Round of 16	Quarterfinals	Semifinals	Final	
Athlete	Event	Opposition Result	Opposition Result	Opposition Result	Opposition Result	Opposition Result	Rank
Jonathan Kyobe	Men's Featherweight	Molwantwa (BOT); L 1 - 4	did not advance				
Joshua Tukamuhebwa	Men's Light welterweight	Hale (NIR); W 3 - 2	Polkinghorn (AUS); W 4 - 1	Sanford (CAN); L 1 - 4	did not advance		
Owen Kibira	Men's Welterweight	Bye	Ali (BAN); W 5 - 0	Zimba (ZAM); L 0 - 5	did not advance		
Isaac Ssenyange	Men's Light middleweight	Pakela (LES); L 1 - 4	did not advance				
Yusuf Nkobeza	Men's Middleweight	Bye	Richardson (ENG); L 1 - 4	did not advance			
Teddy Nakimuli	Women's Light flyweight	—	Bye	Haghighat-Joo (SLE); W WO	McNaul (NIR); L 0-5	Did not advance	3rd place, bronze medalist(s)

== Cycling ==
=== Road ===
Men

Athlete	Event	Time	Rank
Charles Kagimu	Road race	3:38:11	67
Charles Kagimu	Time trial	52:05.91	19

Women

Athlete	Event	Time	Rank
Sarah Nanyanzi	Time trial	1:04:35.27	31

== Netball ==
By virtue of its position in the World Netball Rankings (as of 31 January 2022), Uganda qualified for the tournament.

Complete fixtures were announced in March 2022.

Summary

Team	Event	Group stage						Semifinal	Final / BM / Cl.	
Team	Event	Opposition Result	Opposition Result	Opposition Result	Opposition Result	Opposition Result	Rank	Opposition Result	Opposition Result	Rank
Uganda women	Women's tournament	New Zealand; L 40 - 53	Trinidad and Tobago; W 62 - 28	England; L 35 - 56	Northern Ireland; W 63 - 26	Malawi; W 56 - 43	3	Did not advance	5th place match South Africa; W 54 - 48	5

Roster

Twelve players were officially selected on 13 July 2022.

- Peace Proscovia (c)
- Mary Cholhok Nuba
- Joan Nampungu (co-vc)
- Jesca Achan (co-vc)
- Shaffie Nalwanja
- Stella Oyella
- Norah Lunkuse
- Margaret Baagala
- Sandra Nambirige
- Shadia Nassanga
- Irene Eyaru
- Hanisha Muhameed

Reserves: Viola Asingo, Faridah Kadondi, Alice Wasagali, Shakira Nakanyike, Desire Birungi

Group play

Pos	Team	Pld	W	D	L	GF	GA	GD	Pts	Qualification
1	England (H)	5	5	0	0	321	169	+152	10	Semi-finals
2	New Zealand	5	4	0	1	325	188	+137	8	Semi-finals
3	Uganda	5	3	0	2	256	206	+50	6	Classification matches
4	Malawi	5	2	0	3	258	262	−4	4	Classification matches
5	Northern Ireland	5	1	0	4	155	299	−144	2	Classification matches
6	Trinidad and Tobago	5	0	0	5	136	327	−191	0	Classification matches

Source: Birmingham 2022
(H) Hosts

30 July 2022; 20:00	Report	New Zealand	53–40	Uganda	National Exhibition Centre; Umpires: Gary Burgess; Bronwen Adams
30 July 2022; 20:00	Report	Nweke 32/37 (86%); Selby-Rickit 7/8 (88%); Wilson 14/15 (93%)		Cholhok 19/22 (86%); Eyaru 16/21 (76%); Proscovia 5/8 (63%)	National Exhibition Centre; Umpires: Gary Burgess; Bronwen Adams

31 July 2022; 18:00	Report	Uganda	62–28	Trinidad and Tobago	National Exhibition Centre; Umpires: Louise Travis; Tara Warner
31 July 2022; 18:00	Report	Cholhok 28/32 (88%); Eyaru 9/11 (82%); Nassanga 25/25 (100%)		Cooper 8/13 (62%); Noel 20/23 (87%)	National Exhibition Centre; Umpires: Louise Travis; Tara Warner

2 August 2022; 18:00	Report	England	56–35	Uganda	National Exhibition Centre; Umpires: Tara Warner; Ken Metekingi
2 August 2022; 18:00	Report	Cardwell 27/30 (90%); Harten 14/17 (82%); Housby 15/15 (100%)		Cholhok 6/7 (86%); Eyaru 12/14 (86%); Nassanga 9/12 (75%); Proscovia 8/9 (89%)	National Exhibition Centre; Umpires: Tara Warner; Ken Metekingi

3 August 2022; 12:00	Report	Uganda	63–26	Northern Ireland	National Exhibition Centre; Umpires: Tracy-Ann Griffiths; Gary Burgess
3 August 2022; 12:00	Report	Cholhok 41/46 (89%); Eyaru 8/9 (89%); Nassanga 14/15 (93%)		Bowman 2/8 (25%); Crosbie 14/20 (70%); Magee 7/11 (64%); McGrath 3/5 (60%)	National Exhibition Centre; Umpires: Tracy-Ann Griffiths; Gary Burgess

4 August 2022; 16:00	Report	Malawi	43–56	Uganda	National Exhibition Centre; Umpires: Tara Warner; Gary Burgess
4 August 2022; 16:00	Report	Chimaliro 14/15 (93%); Kumwenda 22/23 (96%); Mvula 4/6 (67%); Simtowe 3/3 (100%)		Cholhok 31/33 (94%); Eyaru 22/23 (96%); Proscovia 3/3 (100%)	National Exhibition Centre; Umpires: Tara Warner; Gary Burgess

Fifth place match

5 August 2022; 17:00	Report	South Africa	48–54	Uganda	National Exhibition Centre; Umpires: Tara Warner; Gary Burgess
5 August 2022; 17:00	Report	Rademan 6/7 (86%) van der Berg 17/18 (94%); Venter 25/29 (86%)		Cholhok 31/35 (89%); Eyaru 21/24 (88%); Nassanga 2/2 (100%)	National Exhibition Centre; Umpires: Tara Warner; Gary Burgess

== Para powerlifting ==
Athlete	Event	Result	Rank
Dennis Mbaziira	Men's heavyweight	103.5	6

== Rugby sevens ==
As of 24 April 2022, Uganda qualified for the men's tournament. This was achieved through their position in the 2022 Africa Men's Sevens.

The thirteen-man roster was announced on 8 July 2022, with Levis Ocen named as a reserve.

Summary

Team	Event	Preliminary Round				Quarterfinal / CQ	Semifinal / CS	Final / BM / CF	
Team	Event	Opposition Result	Opposition Result	Opposition Result	Rank	Opposition Result	Opposition Result	Opposition Result	Rank
Uganda men's	Men's tournament	Kenya; L 14 -27	Australia; T 12 - 12	Jamaica; W 40 - 0	3	Sri Lanka; W 38 - 19	Tonga; W 27 - 7	England; L 17 - 31	10

=== Men's tournament ===
Roster

- Ian Munyani
- Adrian Kasito
- William Nkore
- Philip Wokorach
- Timothy Kisiga
- Michael Wokorach
- Desire Ayera
- Aaron Ofoyrowth
- Isaac Massanganzira
- Norbert Okeny
- Ivan Otema
- Karim Arinaitwe
- Alex Aturinda

Pool D

Pos	Team	Pld	W	D	L	PF	PA	PD	Pts	Qualification
1	Australia	3	2	1	0	81	17	+64	8	Advance to Quarter-finals
2	Kenya	3	2	0	1	77	21	+56	7	Advance to Quarter-finals
3	Uganda	3	1	1	1	66	39	+27	6	Advance to classification Quarter-finals
4	Jamaica	3	0	0	3	0	147	−147	3	Advance to classification Quarter-finals

Updated to match(es) played on 29 July 2022. Source: Birmingham2022
Rules for classification: 1) Points; 2) Head-to-head result; 3) Point difference; 4) Points scored.

29 July 2022
10:50

Kenya	27–14	Uganda
Try: Olindi (2) 1' m, 12' m Humwa 2' c Odhiambo 4' m Wekesa 14' m Con: Olindi (1/3) 3'; Taabu (0/2)	Report	Try: Kisiga 5' c Wokorach 9' c Con: Wokorach (2/2) 5', 10'

Coventry Stadium, Coventry
Referee: Talal-Azmat Chaudhry (Canada)

29 July 2022
19:20

Australia	12–12	Uganda
Try: Malouf 4' m Hutchison 9' c Con: Longbottom (0/1); Roache (1/1) 10'; Cards: Longbottom (yellow card) 11'; Roache (yellow card) 12'	Report	Try: Ayera 7' c Wokorach 12' m Con: Wokorach (1/2) 7'; Cards: Wokorach (0/1)

Coventry Stadium, Coventry
Referee: Morné Ferreira (South Africa)

30 July 2022
10:28

Uganda	40–0	Jamaica
Try: Kasito 1' c Munyani 4' c Ofoyrowth (2) 6' m, 9' c Wokorach 8' c Nkore 12' c Con: Wokorach (5/6) 1', 5', 8', 9', 13'	Report

Coventry Stadium, Coventry
Referee: Jordan Way (Australia)

Classification Quarterfinals

30 July 2022
18:58

Uganda	38–19	Sri Lanka
Try: Wokorach 3' c Ofoyrowth 4' c Munyani 7' m Okorach (3) 9' m, 10' c, 11' c Con: Wokorach (4/6) 3', 4', 10', 12'; Cards: Munyani (yellow card) 3'	Report	Try: Kudachchige 1' c Sooriyabandara 5' c Raffaideen 14' m Con: Sooriyabandara (2/3) 2', 6'

Coventry Stadium, Coventry
Referee: Tevita Rokovereni (Fiji)

Classification Semifinals

31 July 2022
11:36

Uganda	27–7	Tonga
Try: Okorach 1' m Kasito 7' m Wokorach (2) 8' m, 11' m Ofoyrwoth 14' c Con: Wokorach (0/4); Kisiga (1/1) 14'	Report	Try: Osika 4' c Con: Pakalani (1/1) 4'; Cards: Halafihi (yellow card) 10'

Coventry Stadium, Coventry
Referee: Tevita Rokovereni (Fiji)

Classification Finals

31 July 2022
18:44

England	31–17	Uganda
Try: Adamson (3) 3' c, 8' c, 9' m Emery 8' c Bowen 11' m Con: Roddick (1/1) 3'; Emery (2/4) 8', 8'	Report	Try: Ofoyrwoth 5' m Kisiga 12' c Arinaitwe 14' m Con: Wokorach (1/3) 12'

Coventry Stadium, Coventry
Referee: Tevita Rokovereni (Fiji)

== Squash ==
Athlete	Event	Round of 64	Round of 32	Round of 16	Quarterfinals	Semifinals	Final	
Athlete	Event	Opposition Score	Opposition Score	Opposition Score	Opposition Score	Opposition Score	Opposition Score	Rank
Paul Kadoma	Men's singles	Khalil (GUY); L 2 - 3	did not advance					
Michael Kawooya	Men's singles	Adela (SEY); W 3 - 0	Makin (WAL); L 0 - 3	did not advance				
Paul Kadoma; Michael Kawooya	Men's doubles	—	Sachvie / Baillargeon (CAN); L 0 - 2	did not advance				

== Swimming ==
Men

Athlete	Event	Heat		Semifinal		Final	
Athlete	Event	Time	Rank	Time	Rank	Time	Rank
Atuhaire Ambala	50 m freestyle	25.13	53	did not advance			
Atuhaire Ambala	100 m freestyle	54.04	49	did not advance			
Atuhaire Ambala	100 m backstroke	1:01.68	29	did not advance			
Tendo Mukalazi	50 m freestyle	24.37	37	did not advance			
Tendo Mukalazi	100 m freestyle	52.91	39	did not advance			
Tendo Mukalazi	50 m breaststroke	30.79	33	did not advance			

Women

Athlete	Event	Heat		Semifinal		Final	
Athlete	Event	Time	Rank	Time	Rank	Time	Rank
Kirabo Namutebi	50 m freestyle	26.54	20	did not advance			
Kirabo Namutebi	100 m freestyle	1:01.58	41	did not advance			
Kirabo Namutebi	50 m breaststroke	33.87	20	did not advance			
Avice Meya	100 m freestyle	1:03.01	49	did not advance			
Avice Meya	50 m backstroke	33.71	29	did not advance			
Avice Meya	100 m backstroke	1:10.35	24	did not advance			
Husnah Kukundakwe	100 m freestyle S9	1:19.01	9	—		did not advance	

Mixed

Athlete	Event	Heat		Final	
Athlete	Event	Time	Rank	Time	Rank
Atuhaire Ambala; Tendo Mukalzai; Kirabo Namutebi; Avice Meya	4 × 100 m freestyle relay	3:51.75	13	did not advance	
Avice Meya; Tendo Mukalazi; Atuhaire Ambala; Kirabo Namutebi	4 × 100 m medley relay	4:18.04	15	did not advance	

== Table tennis ==
Uganda qualified for the women's team event. Four women were selected following the selection trials that concluded on 29 May 2022.

Singles

Athletes	Event	Group stage			Round of 32	Round of 16	Quarterfinal	Semifinal	Final / BM	
Athletes	Event	Opposition Score	Opposition Score	Rank	Opposition Score	Opposition Score	Opposition Score	Opposition Score	Opposition Score	Rank
Rita Nakhumitsa	Women's singles	Sinon (SEY); W 4 - 0	Nazim (MDV); L 0 - 4	2	did not advance					
Judith Nangonzi	Women's singles	Tsaptsinos (ENG); L 0 - 4	Tee (MAS); L 0 - 4	3	did not advance					
Florence Seera	Women's singles	Hosenally (MRI); L 2 - 4	Silcock (JEY); L 1 - 4	3	did not advance					

Doubles

Athletes	Event	Round of 64	Round of 32	Round of 16	Quarterfinal	Semifinal	Final / BM	
Athletes	Event	Opposition Score	Opposition Score	Opposition Score	Opposition Score	Opposition Score	Opposition Score	Rank
Florence Seera; Rita Nakhumitsa	Women's doubles	Bye	Edwards / Kalam (RSA); L 1 - 3	did not advance				
Judith Nangonzi; Jemimah Nakawala	Women's doubles	Bye	Bardsley / Bolton (ENG); L 0 - 3	did not advance				

Team

Athletes	Event	Group Stage				Quarterfinal	Semifinal	Final	Rank
Athletes	Event	Opposition Score	Opposition Score	Opposition Score	Rank	Opposition Score	Opposition Score	Opposition Score	Rank
Florence Seera; Jemimah Nakawala; Judith Nangonzi; Rita Nakhumitsa	Women's team	Canada; L 0 - 3	Wales; L 0 - 3	Vanuatu; W 3 - 0	3	did not advance			

== Weightlifting ==
Athlete	Event	Weight Lifted		Total	Rank
Athlete	Event	Snatch	Clean & jerk	Total	Rank
Davis Niyoyita	Men's -55 kg	NM	DNS	DNF	

== Wrestling ==
Key:

- VT - Victory by Fall.
- PP - Decision by Points - the loser with technical points.
- PO - Decision by Points - the loser without technical points.

Athlete	Event	Round of 16	Quarterfinal	Semifinal	Repechage	Final / BM	
Athlete	Event	Opposition Result	Opposition Result	Opposition Result	Opposition Result	Opposition Result	Rank
Jacob Ntuyo	Men's -74 kg	Sesay (SLE); L 0 - 10	Did not advance				
Veronica Ayo	Women's -57 kg	Adekuoroye (NGR); L 0 - 2	did not advance		Ayieta (KEN); L 0 - 11	did not advance	
