= Athletics at the 2022 Commonwealth Games – Women's marathon =

Women's marathon at the 2022 Commonwealth Games
- Venue: Victoria Square
- Dates: 30 July 2022
- Competitors: 16 from 11 nations
- Winning time: 2:27:31

Medalists
gold medal	Jessica Stenson	Australia
silver medal	Margaret Wangari Muriuki	Kenya
bronze medal	Helalia Johannes	Namibia

The women's marathon at the 2022 Commonwealth Games, as part of the athletics programme, was held in Victoria Square, Birmingham on 30 July 2022.

== Records ==
Prior to this competition, the existing world and Games records were as follows:

World record	Brigid Kosgei (KEN)	2:14:04	Chicago, United States	13 October 2019
Commonwealth record	Brigid Kosgei (KEN)	2:14:04	Chicago, United States	13 October 2019
Games record	Lisa Martin (AUS)	2:25:28	Auckland, New Zealand	31 January 1990

== Schedule ==
The schedule was as follows:

Date	Time	Round
Saturday 30 July 2022	10:30	Race

All times are British Summer Time (UTC+1)

== Results ==
The results were as follows:

Rank	Athlete	Time	Notes
1st place, gold medalist(s)	Jessica Stenson (AUS)	2:27:31	SB
2nd place, silver medalist(s)	Margaret Wangari Muriuki (KEN)	2:28:00	PB
3rd place, bronze medalist(s)	Helalia Johannes (NAM)	2:28:39	SB
4	Eloise Wellings (AUS)	2:30:51	
5	Sinead Diver (AUS)	2:31:06	SB
6	Failuna Matanga (TAN)	2:31:29	SB
7	Alina Armas (NAM)	2:33:30	SB
8	Mokulubete Makatisi (LES)	2:36:05	PB
9	Clara Evans (WAL)	2:38:03	SB
10	Linet Toroitich Chebet (UGA)	2:38:32	
11	Georgina Schwiening (ENG)	2:40:09	
12	Natasha Cockram (WAL)	2:40:18	SB
13	Katie Mauthoor (MRI)	2:46:43	PB
14	Sarah Webster (IOM)	2:51:53	SB
15	Sharon Firisua (SOL)	3:02:07	PB
16	Jackline Sakilu (TAN)	3:02:33	SB
