= Athletics at the 2022 Commonwealth Games – Women's 5000 metres =

Women's 5000 metres at the 2022 Commonwealth Games
- Venue: Alexander Stadium
- Dates: 7 August
- Competitors: 22 from 13 nations
- Winning time: 14:38.21

Medalists
gold medal	Beatrice Chebet	Kenya
silver medal	Eilish McColgan	Scotland
bronze medal	Selah Jepleting Busienei	Kenya

The women's 5000 metres at the 2022 Commonwealth Games, as part of the athletics programme, took place in the Alexander Stadium on 7 August 2022.

== Records ==
Prior to this competition, the existing World and Games records were as follows:

World record	Letesenbet Gidey (ETH)	14:06.62	Valencia, Spain	7 October 2020
Commonwealth record	Hellen Obiri (KEN)	14:18.37	Rome, Italy	8 June 2017
Games record	Paula Radcliffe (ENG)	14:31.42	Manchester, United Kingdom	28 July 2002

== Schedule ==
The schedule was as follows:

Date	Time	Round
Sunday 7 August 2022	19:45	Final

All times are British Summer Time (UTC+1)

== Results ==
=== Final ===
The medals were determined in the final.

Rank	Name	Result	Notes
1st place, gold medalist(s)	Beatrice Chebet (KEN)	14:38.21	SB
2nd place, silver medalist(s)	Eilish McColgan (SCO)	14:42.14	SB
3rd place, bronze medalist(s)	Selah Jepleting Busienei (KEN)	14:48.24	PB
4	Amy-Eloise Markovc (ENG)	14:56.60	PB
5	Dominique Scott (RSA)	15:07.50	SB
6	Sarah Chelangat (UGA)	15:07.79	SB
7	Sarah Inglis (SCO)	15:08.36	
8	Isobel Batt-Doyle (AUS)	15:13.53	
9	Stella Chesang (UGA)	15:19.01	SB
10	Calli Thackery (ENG)	15:24.82	
11	Roisin Flanagan (NIR)	15:26.76	PB
12	Jennifer Nesbitt (WAL)	15:34.98	
13	Beth Kidger (WAL)	15:37.47	PB
14	Emeline Imanizabayo (RWA)	15:37.87	PB
15	Julie-Anne Staehli (CAN)	15:39.23	SB
16	Sarah Astin (IOM)	15:39.54	
17	Rose Davies (AUS)	15:41.23	
18	Natalie Rule (AUS)	15:51.31	
19	Rachael Franklin (IOM)	16:13.23	
20	Eloise Walker (SCO)	16:28.62	
21	Mathakane Letsie (LES)	17:35.32	SB
22	Dianah Matekali (SOL)	19:06.80	PB
