= Athletics at the 2022 Commonwealth Games – Men's 3000 metres steeplechase =

Men's 3000 metres steeplechase at the 2022 Commonwealth Games
- Venue: Alexander Stadium
- Dates: 6 August
- Competitors: 9 from 6 nations
- Winning time: 8:11.15

Medalists
gold medal	Abraham Kibiwot	Kenya
silver medal	Avinash Sable	India
bronze medal	Amos Serem	Kenya

The men's 3000 metres steeplechase at the 2022 Commonwealth Games, as part of the athletics programme, took place in the Alexander Stadium on 6 August 2022.

== Records ==
Prior to this competition, the existing world and Games records were as follows:

World record	Saif Saaeed Shaheen (QAT)	7:53.63	Brussels, Belgium	3 September 2003
Commonwealth record	Brimin Kipruto (KEN)	7:53.64	Monaco	22 July 2011
Games record	Conseslus Kipruto (KEN)	8:10.08	Gold Coast, Australia	13 April 2018

== Schedule ==
The schedule was as follows:

Date	Time	Round
Saturday 6 August 2022	11:50	Final

All times are British Summer Time (UTC+1)

== Results ==
=== Final ===
The medals were determined in the final.

Rank	Name	Result	Notes
1st place, gold medalist(s)	Abraham Kibiwot (KEN)	8:11.15	
2nd place, silver medalist(s)	Avinash Sable (IND)	8:11.20	NR
3rd place, bronze medalist(s)	Amos Serem (KEN)	8:16.83	
4	John Gay (CAN)	8:30.26	
5	Ben Buckingham (AUS)	8:34.17	
6	Conseslus Kipruto (KEN)	8:34.96	
7	Edward Trippas (AUS)	8:37.42	
8	Zak Seddon (ENG)	8:46.11	
9	Jonathan Hopkins (WAL)	9:06.95	
