= Athletics at the 2022 Commonwealth Games – Women's 3000 metres steeplechase =

Women's 3000 metres steeplechase at the 2022 Commonwealth Games
- Venue: Alexander Stadium
- Dates: 5 August
- Competitors: 8 from 6 nations
- Winning time: 9:15.68

Medalists
gold medal	Jackline Chepkoech	Kenya
silver medal	Elizabeth Bird	England
bronze medal	Peruth Chemutai	Uganda

The women's 3000 metres steeplechase at the 2022 Commonwealth Games, as part of the athletics programme, took place in the Alexander Stadium on 5 August 2022.

== Records ==
Prior to this competition, the existing world and Games records were as follows:

World record	Beatrice Chepkoech (KEN)	8:44.32	Monaco	20 July 2018
Commonwealth record	Beatrice Chepkoech (KEN)	8:44.32	Monaco	20 July 2018
Games record	Dorcus Inzikuru (UGA)	9:19.51	Melbourne, Australia	22 March 2006

== Schedule ==
The schedule was as follows:

Date	Time	Round
Friday 5 August 2022	21:42	Final

All times are British Summer Time (UTC+1)

== Results ==
=== Final ===
The medals were determined in the final.

Rank	Name	Result	Notes
1st place, gold medalist(s)	Jackline Chepkoech (KEN)	9:15.68	GR, PB
2nd place, silver medalist(s)	Elizabeth Bird (ENG)	9:17.79	PB
3rd place, bronze medalist(s)	Peruth Chemutai (UGA)	9:23.24	
4	Aimee Pratt (ENG)	9:27.41	
5	Amy Cashin (AUS)	9:35.63	
6	Eilish Flanagan (NIR)	9:57.18	SB
7	Nilani Ratnayake (SRI)	10:00.34	
8	Brielle Erbacher (AUS)	10:59.64	
