= Athletics at the 2022 Commonwealth Games – Men's 5000 metres =

Men's 5000 metres at the 2022 Commonwealth Games
- Venue: Alexander Stadium
- Dates: 6 August
- Competitors: 20 from 15 nations
- Winning time: 13:08.08

Medalists
gold medal	Jacob Kiplimo	Uganda
silver medal	Nicholas Kimeli	Kenya
bronze medal	Jacob Krop	Kenya

The men's 5000 metres at the 2022 Commonwealth Games, as part of the athletics programme, took place in the Alexander Stadium on 6 August 2022.

== Records ==
Prior to this competition, the existing World and Games records were as follows:

World record	Joshua Cheptegei (UGA)	12:35.36	Monaco	14 August 2020
Commonwealth record	Joshua Cheptegei (UGA)	12:35.36	Monaco	14 August 2020
Games record	Augustine Choge (KEN)	12:56.41	Melbourne, Australia	20 March 2006

== Schedule ==
The schedule was as follows:

Date	Time	Round
Saturday 6 August 2022	20:10	Final

All times are British Summer Time (UTC+1)

== Results ==
=== Final ===
The medals were determined in the final.

Rank	Name	Result	Notes
1st place, gold medalist(s)	Jacob Kiplimo (UGA)	13:08.08	SB
2nd place, silver medalist(s)	Nicholas Kimeli (KEN)	13:08.19	
3rd place, bronze medalist(s)	Jacob Krop (KEN)	13:08.48	
4	Marc Scott (ENG)	13:19.64	SB
5	Yves Nimubona (RWA)	13:20.20	
6	Geordie Beamish (NZL)	13:21.71	
7	Patrick Dever (ENG)	13:22.10	
8	Jack Rayner (AUS)	13:24.90	
9	John Gay (CAN)	13:29.82	PB
10	Matthew Ramsden (AUS)	13:30.38	
11	Cornelius Kemboi (KEN)	13:32.21	
12	David Mullarkey (IOM)	13:43.92	PB
13	William Amponsah (GHA)	13:51.63	NR
14	Daniel Paulus (NAM)	13:53.12	PB
15	Faraja Damasi (TAN)	13:59.16	PB
16	Josephat Gisemo (TAN)	14:05.82	SB
17	Tebello Ramakongoana (LES)	14:54.62	
18	Rosefelo Siosi (SOL)	17:26.93	SB
	Yeshnil Karan (FIJ)	DNF	
	Avinash Sable (IND)	DNF	
