= Athletics at the 2022 Commonwealth Games – Women's 800 metres =

Women's 800 metres at the 2022 Commonwealth Games
- Venue: Alexander Stadium
- Dates: 2 August (first round); 6 August (final)
- Competitors: 18 from 12 nations
- Winning time: 1:57.07

Medalists
| gold medal | Mary Moraa | Kenya |
| silver medal | Keely Hodgkinson | England |
| bronze medal | Laura Muir | Scotland |

The women's 800 metres at the 2022 Commonwealth Games, as part of the athletics programme, took place in the Alexander Stadium on 2 and 6 August 2022.

== Records ==
Prior to this competition, the existing world and Games records were as follows:

| World record | Jarmila Kratochvílová (TCH) | 1:53.28 | Munich, Germany | 26 July 1983 |
| Commonwealth record | Pamela Jelimo (KEN) | 1:54.01 | Zürich, Switzerland | 29 August 2008 |
| Games record | Caster Semenya (RSA) | 1:56.68 | Gold Coast, Australia | 13 April 2018 |

== Schedule ==
The schedule was as follows:

| Date | Time | Round |
|---|---|---|
| Tuesday 2 August 2022 | 11:50 | First round |
| Saturday 6 August 2022 | 19:45 | Final |

All times are British Summer Time (UTC+1)

== Results ==
=== First round ===
The first round consisted of three heats. The two fastest competitors per heat (plus next two fastest) advanced to the final.

| Rank | Heat | Name | Result | Notes |
|---|---|---|---|---|
| 1 | 2 | Natoya Goule (JAM) | 1:58.39 | Q |
| 2 | 2 | Laura Muir (SCO) | 1:58.84 | Q |
| 3 | 1 | Mary Moraa (KEN) | 1:59.22 | Q |
| 4 | 1 | Halimah Nakaayi (UGA) | 1:59.35 | Q |
| 5 | 2 | Alexandra Bell (ENG) | 1:59.76 | q, SB |
| 6 | 2 | Lindsey Butterworth (CAN) | 2:00.04 | q |
| 7 | 1 | Prudence Sekgodiso (RSA) | 2:00.17 | |
| 8 | 3 | Keely Hodgkinson (ENG) | 2:00.18 | Q |
| 9 | 1 | Georgia Griffith (AUS) | 2:00.36 | SB |
| 10 | 3 | Catriona Bisset (AUS) | 2:00.40 | Q |
| 11 | 3 | Jemma Reekie (SCO) | 2:00.68 | |
| 12 | 3 | Jarinter Mwasya (KEN) | 2:00.95 | |
| 13 | 2 | Gayanthika Abeyratne (SRI) | 2:01.20 | NR |
| 14 | 3 | Madeleine Kelly (CAN) | 2:02.99 | |
| 15 | 1 | Jenny Selman (SCO) | 2:06.53 | |
| 16 | 2 | Joanna Archer (GUY) | 2:07.24 | |
| 17 | 1 | Manqabang Tsibela (LES) | 2:13.34 | |
| 18 | 3 | Rebecca Bernardin (TCA) | 2:25.83 | |

=== Final ===
The medals were determined in the final.

| Rank | Name | Result | Notes |
|---|---|---|---|
| 1st place, gold medalist(s) | Mary Moraa (KEN) | 1:57.07 | |
| 2nd place, silver medalist(s) | Keely Hodgkinson (ENG) | 1:57.40 | |
| 3rd place, bronze medalist(s) | Laura Muir (SCO) | 1:57.87 | |
| 4 | Natoya Goule (JAM) | 1:57.88 | SB |
| 5 | Catriona Bisset (AUS) | 1:59.41 | |
| 6 | Alexandra Bell (ENG) | 2:00.52 | |
| 7 | Lindsey Butterworth (CAN) | 2:00.79 | |
| 8 | Halimah Nakaayi (UGA) | 2:01.17 | |
