= Athletics at the 2022 Commonwealth Games – Men's 10,000 metres =

Men's 10,000 metres at the 2022 Commonwealth Games
- Venue: Alexander Stadium
- Dates: 2 August
- Competitors: 9 from 7 nations
- Winning time: 27:09.19

Medalists
gold medal	Jacob Kiplimo	Uganda
silver medal	Daniel Ebenyo	Kenya
bronze medal	Kibiwott Kandie	Kenya

The men's 10,000 metres at the 2022 Commonwealth Games, as part of the athletics programme, took place in the Alexander Stadium on 2 August 2022.

== Records ==
Prior to this competition, the existing World and Games records were as follows:

World record	Joshua Cheptegei (UGA)	26:11.00	Valencia, Spain	7 October 2020
Commonwealth record	Joshua Cheptegei (UGA)	26:11.00	Valencia, Spain	7 October 2020
Games record	Joshua Cheptegei (UGA)	27:19.62	Gold Coast, Australia	13 April 2018

== Schedule ==
The schedule was as follows:

Date	Time	Round
Tuesday 2 August 2022	20:35	Final

All times are British Summer Time (UTC+1)

== Results ==
=== Final ===
The medals were determined in the final.

Rank	Name	Result	Notes
1st place, gold medalist(s)	Jacob Kiplimo (UGA)	27:09.19	GR, SB
2nd place, silver medalist(s)	Daniel Ebenyo (KEN)	27:11.26	PB
3rd place, bronze medalist(s)	Kibiwott Kandie (KEN)	27:20.34	PB
4	Edward Zakayo (KEN)	27:39.03	
5	Adriaan Wildschutt (RSA)	27:41.04	
6	Ky Robinson (AUS)	27:44.33	PB
7	Andrew Butchart (SCO)	27:53.57	
8	Joseph Tiophil Panga (TAN)	28:13.87	PB
	Sam Atkin (ENG)	DNF	
