= Priyanka Goswami =

Indian racewalker

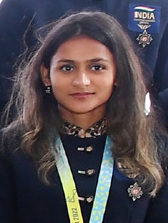
- Priyanka in 2022

Personal information
- Nationality: Indian
- Born: March 10, 1996 (age 30) Muzaffarnagar, Uttar Pradesh, India
- Employer: Indian Railways

Sport
- Sport: Race walk
- Coached by: Ronald Weigel
Medal record
Women's athletics
Representing India
Commonwealth Games
Silver medal – second place	2022 Birmingham	10km walk
Asian Championships
Silver medal – second place	2023 Bangkok	20km walk
World University Games
Bronze medal – third place	2021 Chengdu	20km walk team

Priyanka Goswami (born 10 March 1996) is an Indian race walk athlete. A two time Olympian, she represented India at the 2020 Tokyo Olympics where she finished 17th and the 2024 Paris Olympics where she finished 41st. At the 2022 Commonwealth Games, she became the first Indian woman to win a medal in a race walk event, with a silver in the 10 km event.

== Biography ==
Goswami practised gymnastics at school for a few months before switching to athletics. She was attracted to running because of the prize bags available to successful competitors.

In February 2021, she won the Indian Racewalking Championship in the 20 km race, with a new Indian record of 1:28.45, and qualified for the 2020 Summer Olympics. She previously won the Indian Racewalking Championship in 2017.

She works as an OS for Indian Railways.
