= Athletics at the 2022 Commonwealth Games – Men's 10,000 metres walk =

Men's 10,000 metres walk at the 2022 Commonwealth Games
- Venue: Alexander Stadium
- Dates: 7 August
- Competitors: 10 from 6 nations
- Winning time: 38:36.37

Medalists
gold medal	Evan Dunfee	Canada
silver medal	Declan Tingay	Australia
bronze medal	Sandeep Kumar	India

The Men's 10,000 metres walk at the 2022 Commonwealth Games, as part of the athletics programme, took place in the Alexander Stadium on 7 August 2022.

== Records ==
Prior to this competition, the existing world and Games records were as follows:

World record	Eiki Takahashi (JPN)	37:25.21	Inzai, Japan	14 November 2020
Commonwealth record	David Smith (AUS)	38:20.9	Sydney, Australia	15 September 1985
Games record	New event			

== Schedule ==
The schedule was as follows:

Date	Time	Round
Sunday 7 August 2022	11:20	Final

All times are British Summer Time (UTC+1)

== Results ==
=== Final ===
The medals were determined in the final.

Rank	Name	Result	Notes
1st place, gold medalist(s)	Evan Dunfee (CAN)	38:36.37	GR, PB
2nd place, silver medalist(s)	Declan Tingay (AUS)	38:42.33	PB
3rd place, bronze medalist(s)	Sandeep Kumar (IND)	38:49.21	PB
4	Callum Wilkinson (ENG)	39:06.28	SB
5	Samuel Gathimba (KEN)	39:23.14	PB
6	Kyle Swan (AUS)	40:49.79	
7	Tom Bosworth (ENG)	40:58.64	
8	Rhydian Cowley (AUS)	41:28.05	
9	Amit Khatri (IND)	43:04.97	SB
	Quentin Rew (NZL)	DQ	TR 54.7.5
