= Athletics at the 2022 Commonwealth Games – Women's 10,000 metres walk =

Women's 10,000 metres walk at the 2022 Commonwealth Games
- Venue: Alexander Stadium
- Dates: 6 August
- Competitors: 8 from 4 nations
- Winning time: 42:34.30

Medalists
gold medal	Jemima Montag	Australia
silver medal	Priyanka Goswami	India
bronze medal	Emily Wamusyi Ngii	Kenya

The Women's 10,000 metres walk at the 2022 Commonwealth Games, as part of the athletics programme, took place in the Alexander Stadium on 6 August 2022.

== Records ==
Prior to this competition, the existing world and Games records were as follows:

World record	Nadezhda Ryashkina (URS)	41:56.23	Seattle, United States	24 July 1990
Commonwealth record	Kerry Saxby (AUS)	41:57.22	Seattle, United States	24 July 1990
Games record	New event			

== Schedule ==
The schedule was as follows:

Date	Time	Round
Saturday 6 August 2022	10:30	Final

All times are British Summer Time (UTC+1)

== Results ==
=== Final ===
The medals were determined in the final.

Rank	Name	Result	Notes
1st place, gold medalist(s)	Jemima Montag (AUS)	42:34.30	GR, PB
2nd place, silver medalist(s)	Priyanka Goswami (IND)	43:38.83	NR
3rd place, bronze medalist(s)	Emily Wamusyi Ngii (KEN)	43:50.86	AR
4	Rebecca Henderson (AUS)	44:44.58	
5	Heather Lewis (WAL)	45:09.19	PB
6	Bethan Davies (WAL)	45:45.59	SB
7	Katie Hayward (AUS)	46:09.51	
8	Bhawna Jat (IND)	47:14.13	PB
