= 2021 World Athletics U20 Championships – Women's 3000 metres steeplechase =

Women's 3000 metres steeplechase at the 2021 World Athletics U20 Championships
- Venue: Kasarani Stadium
- Dates: 20 August
- Competitors: 16 from 12 nations
- Winning time: 9:27.40

Medalists
gold medal	Jackline Chepkoech	Kenya
silver medal	Zerfe Wondemagegn	Ethiopia
bronze medal	Faith Cherotich	Kenya

The women's 3000 metres steeplechase at the 2021 World Athletics U20 Championships was held at the Kasarani Stadium on 20 August.

== Records ==
Standing records prior to the 2021 World Athletics U20 Championships
World U20 Record	Celliphine Chespol (KEN)	8:58.78	Eugene, United States	26 May 2017
Championship Record	Celliphine Chespol (KEN)	9:12.78	Tampere, Finland	13 July 2018
World U20 Leading	Zerfe Wondemagegn (ETH)	9:16.41	Tokyo, Japan	4 August 2021

== Results ==
The final was held on 20 August at 18:05. (KEN)

Rank	Name	Nationality	Time	Note
1st place, gold medalist(s)	Jackline Chepkoech	Kenya	9:27.40	PB
2nd place, silver medalist(s)	Zerfe Wondemagegn	Ethiopia	9:35.22	
3rd place, bronze medalist(s)	Faith Cherotich	Kenya	9:44.76	
4	Emebet Kebede	Ethiopia	10:17.52	
5	Gréta Varga	Hungary	10:48.34	
6	Marta Serrano	Spain	10:49.14	
7	Şevval Özdoğan	Turkey	10:49.79	
8	Khadija Ennasri	Morocco	10:50.66	
9	Rihab Dhahri	Tunisia	10:52.12	
10	Soukaina Elhaji	Morocco	10:53.15	
11	Ekaterina Domnina	Authorised Neutral Athletes	10:55.48	
12	Natalia Bielak	Poland	10:57.21	
13	Katja Pattis	Italy	11:04.09	
14	Verónica Huacasi	Peru	11:04.88	
15	Julia Koralewska	Poland	11:22.23	
16	Venla Saari	Finland	11:34.95	
