= Athletics at the 2022 Commonwealth Games – Women's 10,000 metres =

Women's 10,000 metres at the 2022 Commonwealth Games
- Venue: Alexander Stadium
- Dates: 3 August
- Competitors: 14 from 9 nations
- Winning time: 30:48.60

Medalists
gold medal	Eilish McColgan	Scotland
silver medal	Irene Chepet Cheptai	Kenya
bronze medal	Sheila Chepkirui	Kenya

The women's 10,000 metres at the 2022 Commonwealth Games, as part of the athletics programme, took place in the Alexander Stadium on 3 August 2022.

Eilish McColgan won the gold medal in a new Commonwealth games record time. Her mother Liz McColgan won the same event at the 1986 and 1990 Commonwealth Games.

== Records ==
Prior to this competition, the existing world and Games records were as follows:

World record	Letesenbet Gidey (ETH)	29:01.03	Hengelo, Netherlands	8 June 2021
Commonwealth record	Vivian Cheruiyot (KEN)	29:32.53	Rio de Janeiro, Brazil	12 August 2016
Games record	Salina Kosgei (KEN)	31:27.83	Manchester, England	30 July 2002

== Schedule ==
The schedule was as follows:

Date	Time	Round
Wednesday 3 August 2022	20:00	Final

All times are British Summer Time (UTC+1)

== Results ==
=== Final ===
The medals were determined in the final.

Rank	Name	Result	Notes
1st place, gold medalist(s)	Eilish McColgan (SCO)	30:48.60	GR
2nd place, silver medalist(s)	Irene Chepet Cheptai (KEN)	30:49.52	SB
3rd place, bronze medalist(s)	Sheila Chepkirui (KEN)	31:09.46	SB
4	Stella Chesang (UGA)	31:14.14	
5	Jessica Judd (ENG)	31:18.47	
6	Samantha Harrison (ENG)	31:21.53	PB
7	Dominique Scott (RSA)	31:25.18	
8	Isobel Batt-Doyle (AUS)	32:04.52	
9	Sara Inglis (SCO)	32:04.74	
10	Rachael Zena Chebet (UGA)	32:30.95	
11	Celine Iranzi (RWA)	32:48.60	PB
12	Neheng Khatala (LES)	33:27.35	PB
13	Mathakane Letsie (LES)	36:50.62	PB
	Hannah Irwin (NIR)	DNF	
