= Bhawna Jat =

Indian racewalker

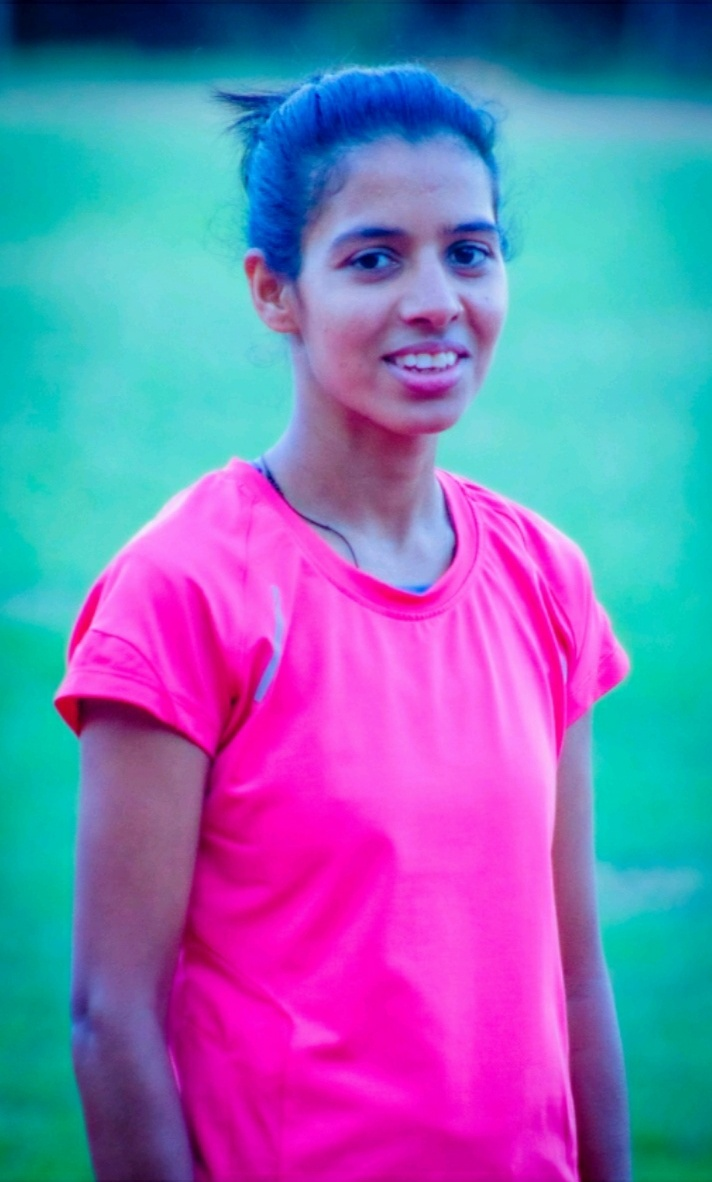
- Bhawna Jat in 2021

Personal information
- Born: 1 March 1996 (age 30) Kabra, Rajsamand district, Rajasthan, India

Sport
- Sport: Track and field
- Event: 20 kilometres race walk

Achievements and titles
- Personal best: 1:29:54 (2020 Ranchi)
- Updated on 26 February 2020

Bhawna Jat (born 1 March 1996) is an Indian racewalker from Rajasthan who participated in the 2020 Summer Olympics in Tokyo, finishing on 32nd position in 20 kilometres race walk.

== Early life ==
Jat was born on 3 January 1996 as the youngest of three children into a family of farmers. She picked up racewalking at the age of 13 when her physical education teacher took her to a district-level athletics competition where slots were available only in the 3000 metres race walk; she finished second in the event. In the subsequent years, she would train only in the early hours of the day in order to avoid conservative villagers from seeing her in shorts. As her family was financially weak, she had to quit studies in college and even compete barefoot during her early years.

== Career ==
Between 2014 and 2015, Jat won medals in zonal and national junior level competitions. In 2016, she landed a job with the Indian Railways as a ticket collector in Howrah, West Bengal.

At the National Open Championships in February 2020, Jat broke the national record by clocking 1:29:54 and qualified for the 2020 Summer Olympics which had a qualification standard of 1:31:00. The timing was an improvement of over eight minutes from her previous personal best set in October 2019 and over 23 minutes from her February 2019 National Open Championships time.

In the 2022 Commonwealth Games, she recorded her personal best in the 10000 meters race walk and ended 8th.

Jat was issued with a sixteen-month competition ban to run from August 2023 to December 2024 by the Indian National Anti-Doping Agency (NADA) in relation to an anti-doping rule violation due to whereabouts failures.
