= Sandeep Kumar (race walker) =

Indian racewalker (born 1986)

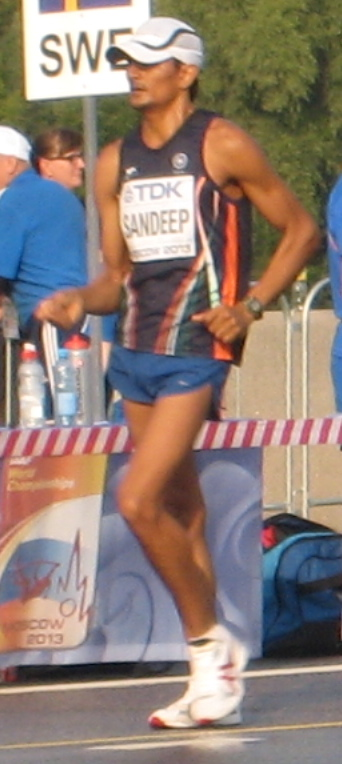
- Sandeep in 2013

Personal information
- Full name: Sandeep Kumar Punia
- Born: 1 May 1986 (age 40) Mahendragarh, Haryana, India
- Military career
- Branch: Indian Army
- Service years: 2006–present
- Rank: Subedar
- Unit: Jat Regiment

Sport
- Sport: Athletics
- Event: Race walk
- Coached by: Ronald Weigel

Achievements and titles
- Personal bests: 10 km race walk: 38:49.21 NR (2022); 50 km race walk: 3:55:59 NR (2017)
Medal record
Men's athletics
Representing India
Commonwealth Games
Bronze medal – third place	2022 Birmingham	10km walk

Sandeep Kumar Punia (born 1 May 1986) is an Indian race walker. Subedar Sandeep Serving in Jat Regiment (16) Indian Army represented India in the 50 km race walk event at the 2016 Rio Olympics and in the 20 km race walk event at the 2020 Tokyo Olympics. In the 2022 Commonwealth Games, he won a bronze in the 10 km race walk event.
