= Billy Odhiambo =

Kenyan rugby sevens player

- Full name: Lamech Billy Odhiambo
- Born: November 7, 1993 (age 33) Kisumu, Kenya
- Height: 1.84 m (6 ft 0 in)
- Weight: 95 kg (209 lb)

Rugby union career
National sevens team
Years	Team	Comps
- Kenya

Billy Odhiambo (born November 7, 1993) is a Kenyan rugby sevens player. He was named in Kenya 7s's squad for the 2016 Summer Olympics in Brazil. He was also selected for the 2014 Commonwealth Games in Scotland.

Odhiambo was part of Kenya's squad in the 2020 Summer Olympics. In 2022, He competed for Kenya at the Rugby World Cup Sevens in Cape Town.

He also represented Kenya at the 2018 Commonwealth Games and 2022 Commonwealth Games.
