= Michael Githae =

Kenyan runner

Personal information
- Born: 26 August 1994 (age 31)

Sport
- Country: Kenya
- Sport: Marathon running
Medal record
Men's Track and field
Representing Kenya
Commonwealth Games
Bronze medal – third place	2022 Birmingham	Marathon

Michael Mugo Githae is a Kenyan marathon winner, who won bronze at the 2022 Commonwealth Games in Birmingham, England. Githae's medal was the first medal won by Kenya at the games.
