= Jackline Chepkoech =

Kenyan steeplechase runner (born 2003)

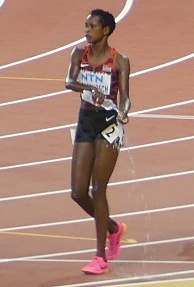
- Jackline Chepkoech in 2023

Personal information
- Nationality: Kenyan
- Born: 3 October 2003 (age 23) Olenguruone, Nakuru County, Kenya

Sport
- Country: Kenya
- Sport: Athletics
- Event: 3000 metres steeplechase

Achievements and titles
- Personal best: 3000 m st.: 8.57.35 (London 2023)
Medal record
Women's athletics
Representing Kenya
Commonwealth Games
Gold medal – first place	2022 Birmingham	3000 m st.
World U20 Championships
Gold medal – first place	2021 Nairobi	3000 m st.

Jackline Chepkoech (born 3 October 2003) is a Kenyan athlete who specializes in the 3000 metres steeplechase. At the age of 18, she won the gold medal at the 2022 Commonwealth Games in Birmingham, setting the Games record in the process.

Chepkoech was the 2021 World Under-20 champion.

== Achievements ==
=== Circuit wins, and National championships ===
- Diamond League
  - 2022 (3000 m st.): Brussels Memorial Van Damme (PB)
- Kenyan Athletics Championships
  - 3000 m steeplechase: 2022
