= Jacob Krop =

Kenyan middle-distance runner

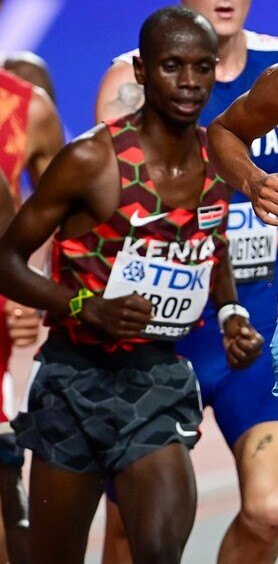
- Jacob Krop in 2023

Personal information
- Born: 4 June 2001 (age 25) West Pokot County, Kenya
- Employer: Adidas

Sport
- Country: Kenya
- Sport: Athletics
- Event: Long-distance running

Achievements and titles
- Highest world ranking: 1st (5000m, weeks 51)
- Personal bests: 3000 m: 7:28.83 (Paris 2024); 5000 m: 12:45.71 (Brussels 2022); Indoors; 3000 m: 7:31.35 (Liévin 2023); Road; 5 km: 13:02 (Zürich 2021); 10 km: 27:04 (Valencia 2023)
Medal record
Men's athletics
Representing Kenya
World Championships
Silver medal – second place	2022 Eugene	5000 m
Bronze medal – third place	2023 Budapest	5000 m
Commonwealth Games
Bronze medal – third place	2022 Birmingham	5000 m
African U20 Championships
Silver medal – second place	2019 Abidjan	5000 m

Jacob Krop (born 4 June 2001) is a Kenyan long-distance runner. He won the silver medal in the 5000 metres at the 2022 World Athletics Championships and bronze at the 2023 World Athletics Championships and the 2022 Commonwealth Games.

At age 17, Krop was the 5000 m silver medallist at the 2019 African Under-20 Championships.

== Career ==
In April 2019, 17-year-old Jacob Krop ran a new personal best in the 5000 metres of 13:14.44 to take the silver medal at the African U20 Championships in Athletics in Abidjan, Ivory Coast. After placing fourth in the event at the Kenyan Trials, he qualified for the Doha World Championships in Qatar as first and second runner did not comply with the AIU anti-doping rules. He finished sixth in Doha with a new personal best of 13:03.08.

Krop competed at the 2022 World Athletics Championships in the 5000 m event and won the silver medal in a time of 13:09.98.

== Achievements ==
=== International competitions ===
Representing Kenya
Year	Competition	Venue	Position	Event	Time
2019	African U18/U20 Championships, U20 events	Abidjan, Ivory Coast	2nd	5000 m	13:14.44
2019	World Championships	Doha, Qatar	6th	5000 m	13:03.08 PB
2022	World Indoor Championships	Belgrade, Serbia	5th	3000 m	7:43.26
2022	World Championships	Eugene, OR, United States	2nd	5000 m	13:09.98
2022	Commonwealth Games	Birmingham, United Kingdom	3rd	5000 m	13:08.48
2023	World Championships	Budapest, Hungary	3rd	5000 m	13:12.28
2024	Olympic Games	Paris, France	10th	5000 m	13:18.68
2025	World Championships	Tokyo, Japan	14th (h)	5000 m	13:28.73
2026	World Indoor Championships	Toruń, Poland	4th	3000 m	7:36.76
2026	World Ultimate Championship	Budapest, Hungary	10th	5000 m	13:06.62

=== Circuit wins ===
- Diamond League
  - 2022: Brussels Memorial Van Damme (5000 m, WL PB)
