= Kevin Wekesa =

Kenyan rugby sevens player (born 2000)

- Born: 7 August 2000 (age 26)
- Height: 185 cm (6 ft 1 in)
- Weight: 98 kg (216 lb; 15 st 6 lb)

Rugby union career
National sevens team
Years	Team	Comps
2021–Present	Kenya	

Kevin Wekesa (born 7 August 2000) is a Kenyan rugby sevens player. He represented Kenya at the 2024 Summer Olympics in Paris.

Activism

Working with children in rural Kenya, he learned about the impact of climate change and desertification which inspired him to start an initiative called Play Green, focusing on raising awareness of plastic pollution, growing trees, and greening spaces. For this work, he was among the winners of the 2025 IOC Climate Action Awards.
