= Daniel Ebenyo =

Kenyan athlete (born 1995)

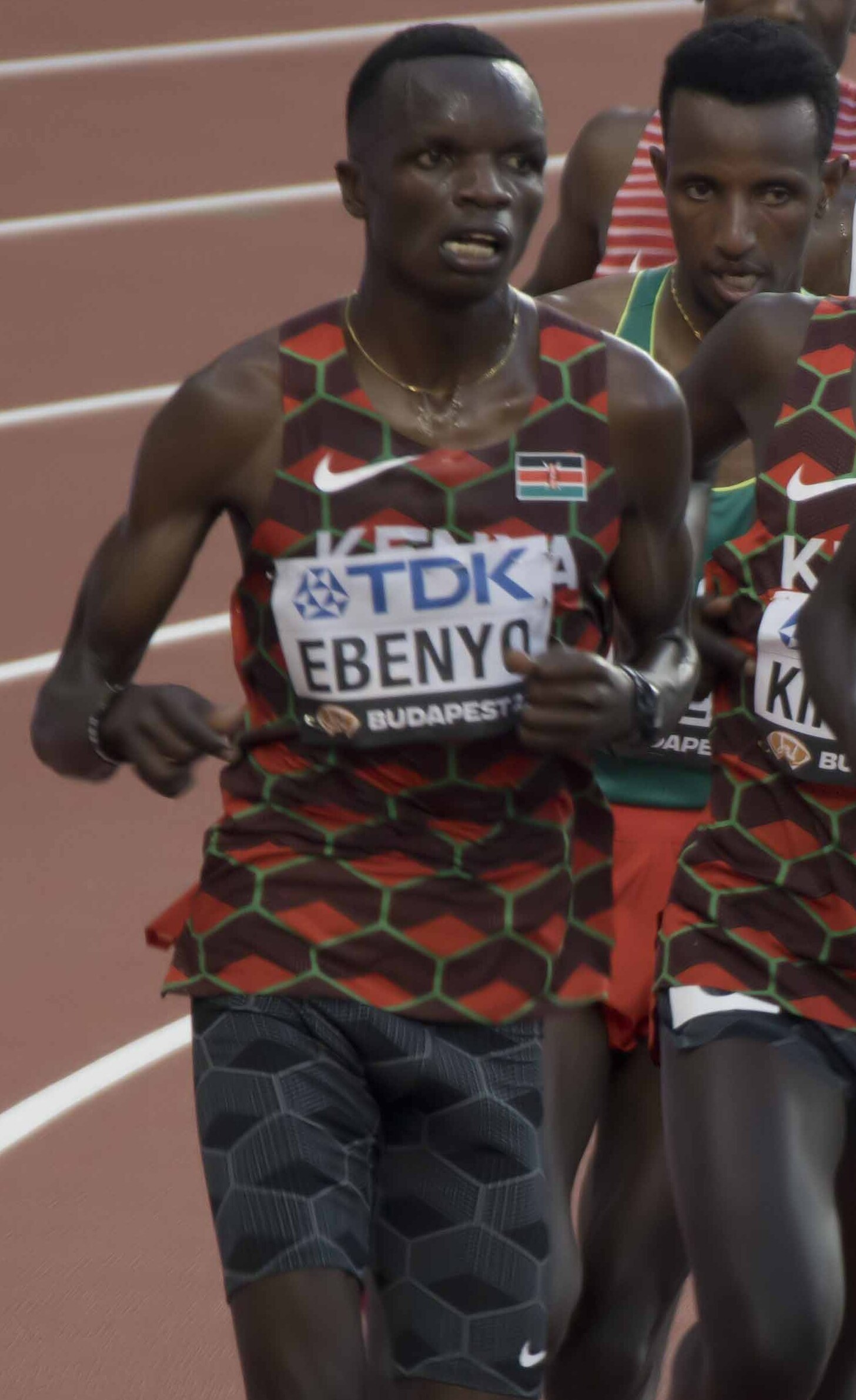
- Ebenyo in 2023

Personal information
- Full name: Daniel Simiu Ebenyo
- Nationality: Kenyan
- Born: 18 September 1995 (age 31)

Sport
- Sport: Track and Field
- Events: 5000m, 10000m
Medal record
Men's athletics
Representing Kenya
World Championships
| Silver medal – second place | 2023 Budapest | 10,000 m |
World Road Running Championships
| Silver medal – second place | 2023 Riga | Half-marathon |
Commonwealth Games
| Silver medal – second place | 2022 Birmingham | 10,000m |
African Championships
| Silver medal – second place | 2022 Port Louis | 5000m |
World Cross Country Championships
| Gold medal – first place | 2023 Bathurst | Senior team |
| Silver medal – second place | 2026 Tallahassee | Senior team |
| Bronze medal – third place | 2026 Tallahassee | Senior race |

Daniel Simiu Ebenyo (born 18 September 1995) is a Kenyan middle-distance and long-distance runner.

== Early life ==
Brought up in Baragoi, Samburu County, having lost his father early in life to cattle rustling, he was raised by his mother and later, grandmother. He has said that it was while at Aiyam Day secondary school a 24 km trek to the learning institution and back home would eventually make him an athlete as walking to school early in the morning and back in the evening was the most dangerous time to do the journey as they crossed bandits' battle grounds along the narrow paths to the school and even though he would set off at 5:30 am for an 8 am start at school, would sometimes be forced to take an even longer route. He now trains in Iten in the Rift Valley.

== Career ==
He finished in second place at the 2019 Kenya national World championships trials. However, he was unable to compete as he failed to meet some of the Athletes Integrity Unit (AIU) doping requirements. Simiyu did the in-competition test several times, but did not meet the required three out-of- competition tests that are mandatory for all athletes and include both urine and blood must include at least one Athlete Biological Passport (ABP) test and one Erythropoietin (Epo) test. Simiyu blamed Athletics Kenya for the debacle, claiming the federation did not inform him of the regulations before he signed up for the trials. He was so disappointed he contemplated quitting the track and venturing into road racing full time and he won the Safaricom Kisii 10 km road race in a time of 29:16.71 as well as winning the 10 km race at the Nairobi Marathon in an event record time of 28:23.

He started the 2021 season with a victory after winning the elite-only San Silvestre Vallecana 10 km in Spain on 3 January.

He earned a spot on the Kenyan team for the 2020 Summer Games in the 5000m after finishing in the top 2 at the Kenyan Olympic trials after running a personal best 13:05.05. behind Nicholas Kimeli, and was confirmed on the Kenyan team.

In March 2022, he finished fourth over 3000m at the 2022 World Athletics Indoor Championships in Belgrade. He then won the Kenyan 5000m title as well as winning silver at the 2022 African Athletics Championships. He qualified for the 5000m final at the 2023 World Athletics Championships in Eugene, Oregon. He won the silver medal over 10,000m at the 2022 Commonwealth Games held in Birmingham.

In the 10,000m race at the 2023 World Athletics Championships in Budapest, he placed second to win the silver medal. He was a silver medalist in the half marathon at the 2023 World Athletics Road Running Championships in Riga, Latvia in October 2023.

On 7 April 2024, he won the Berlin Half Marathon with a time of 59:30.

On 22 February 2025, he won the Sirikwa Classic, the World Athletics Cross Country Tour Gold meeting in Eldoret. He won the Kenyan Cross Country Championships over 10km in Eldoret on 25 October 2025. He was subsequently selected to represent Kenya at the 2026 World Athletics Cross Country Championships in Tallahassee, United States, winning the bronze medal in the individual race and silver with Kenya in the team competition.

In July 2026, he competed in the 10,000 metres at the 2026 Commonwealth Games in Glasgow, Scotland, placing sixth overall. Ebenyo competed in the half marathon at the 2026 World Athletics Road Running Championships in Copenhagen on 20 September 2026, placing ninth overall.

== Personal bests ==
Outdoor

- 3000 metres – 7:40.39 (Zagreb 2022)
- Two miles – 8:19.67 (Eugene 2021)
- 5000 metres – 12:54.90 (Brussels 2022)
- 10,000 metres – 27:11.26 (Birmingham 2022)

Indoor

- 3000 metres – 7:37.86 (Metz 2022)

Road

- 10K – 26:58 (Valencia 2022)
- Half marathon – 59:04 (Manama 2022)
