= List of Commonwealth Games records in athletics =

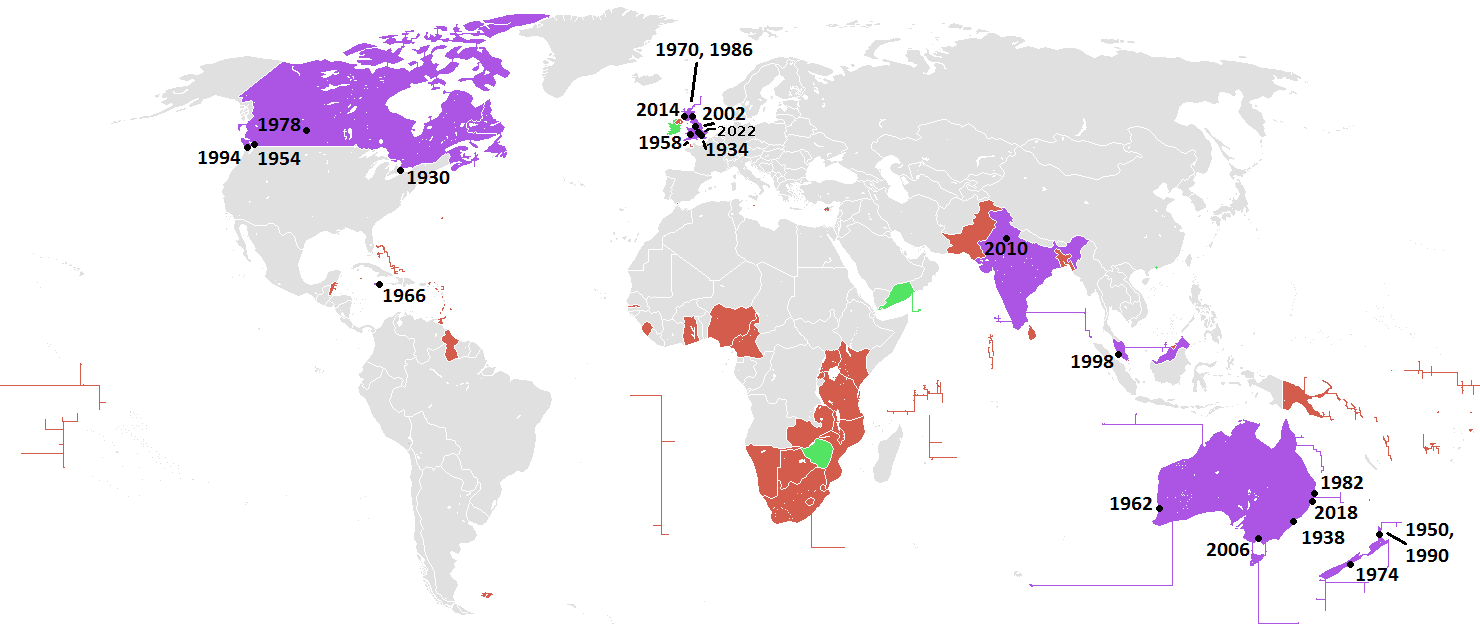
Commonwealth Games records in athletics are set by athletes competing from a range of nations within the Commonwealth of Nations.

The Commonwealth Games is a quadrennial event which began in 1930 as the British Empire Games. The Commonwealth Games Federation accepts only athletes from the Commonwealth of Nations and recognises records set at editions of the Commonwealth Games. The athletics events at the Games are divided into four groups: track events (including sprints, middle- and long-distance running, hurdling and relays), field events (including javelin, discus, hammer, pole vault, long and triple jumps), road events and combined events (triathlon, heptathlon and decathlon). There are also several track and field events held for disabled athletes.

Many Commonwealth Games records were set over distances using imperial measurements, such as the 100-yard dash, and (as a result of metric standardisation in 1966) many records belong to defunct events. The oldest record is George Bailey's 9:52.0 minutes in the seldom used men's two mile steeplechase, which was set at the inaugural Games. The two longest lasting records in current events were both set at the 1974 edition of the Games: Englishman Ian Thompson's record of 2:09:12 hours in the Marathon, and Tanzanian Filbert Bayi's record of 3:32.16 minutes in the 1500 metres, which was also a world record.

Nathan Deakes holds two Commonwealth Games records: the 20 km and 50 km walk events. Adekunle Adesoji and Chantal Petitclerc also hold two records each in the para-sports events.

== Men's records ==
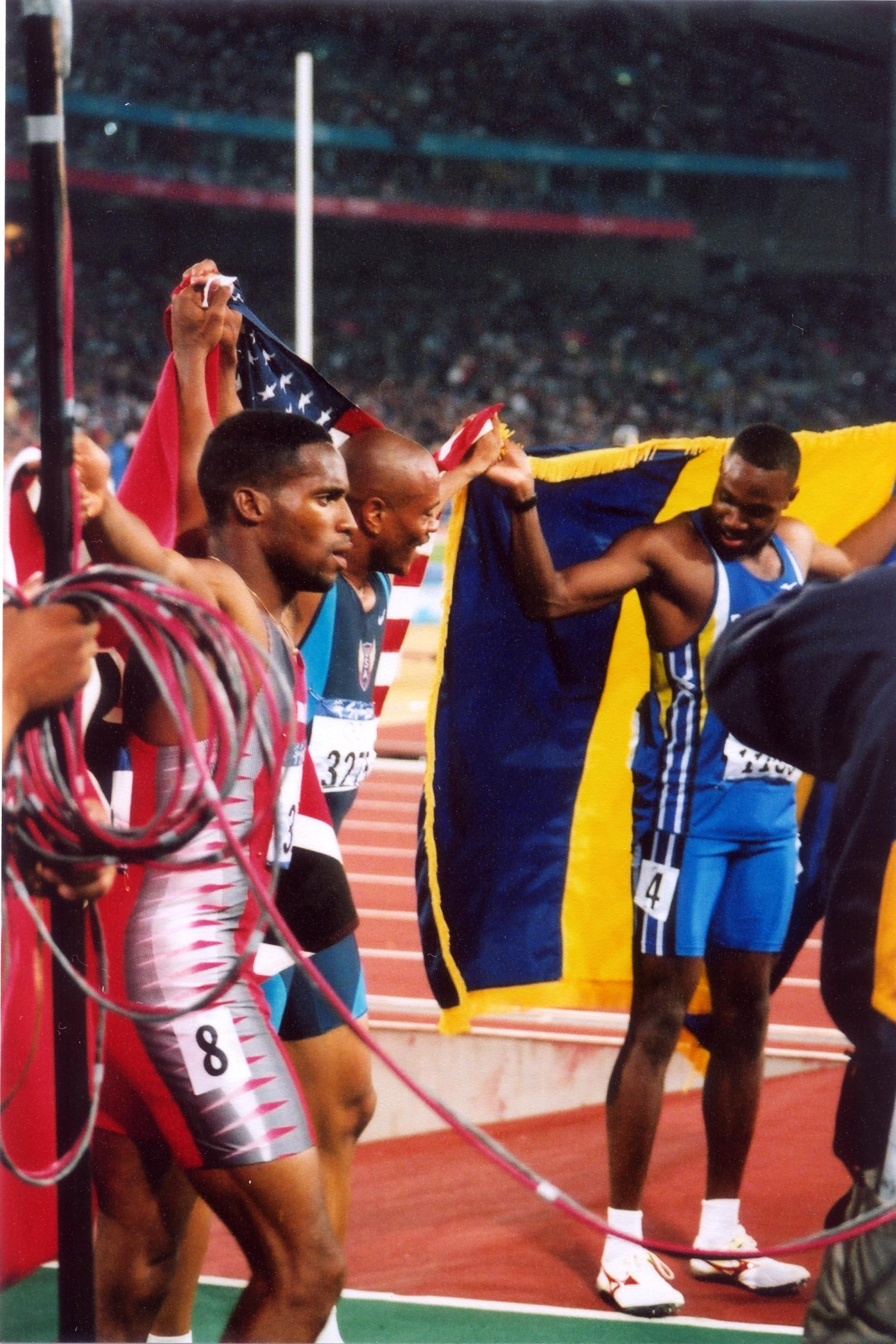
Ato Boldon (left) beat 200 m record holder Frankie Fredericks in 1998 to set the current 100 m record.

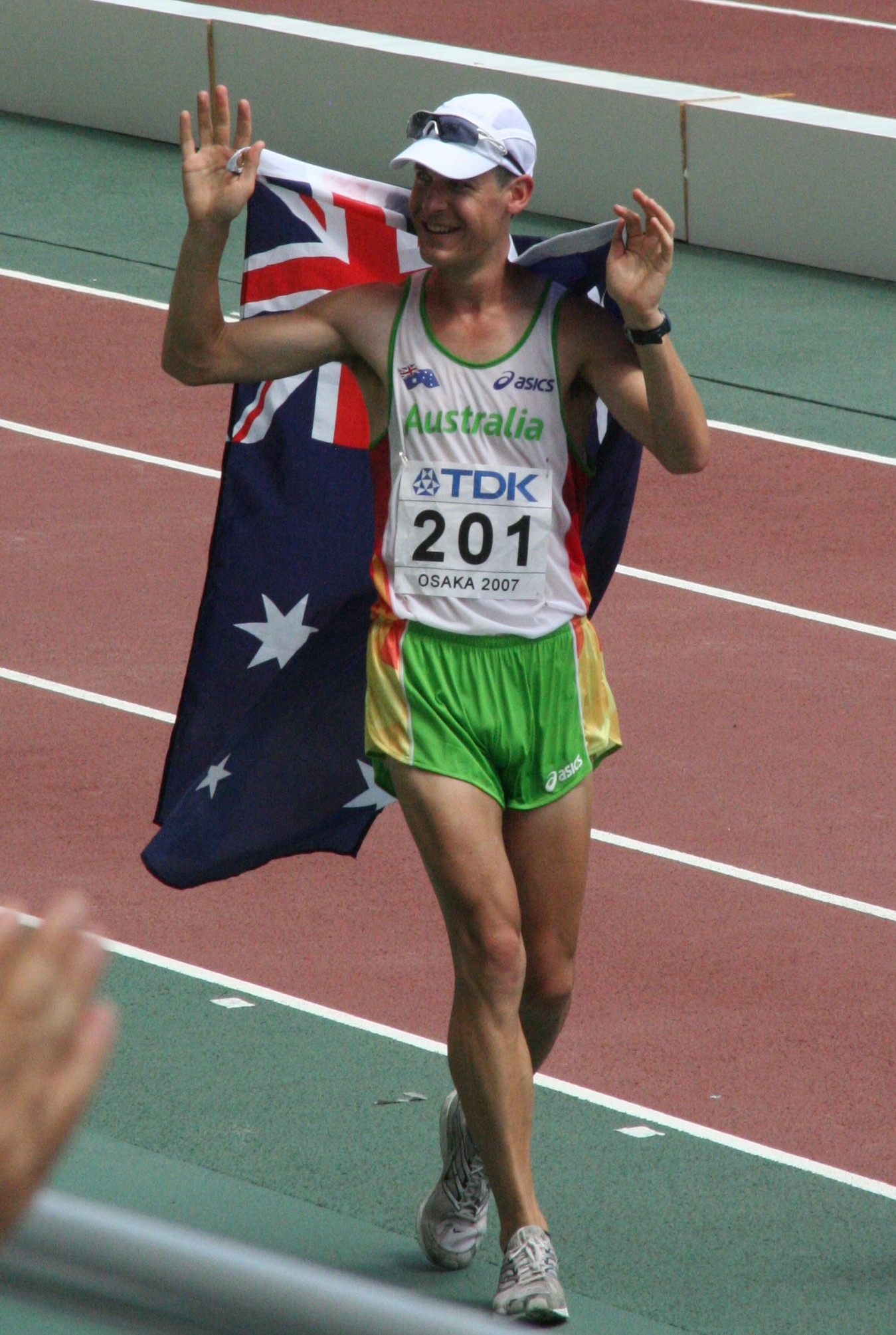
Former 50 km walk world record holder Nathan Deakes holds the record for the 50 km walk event.

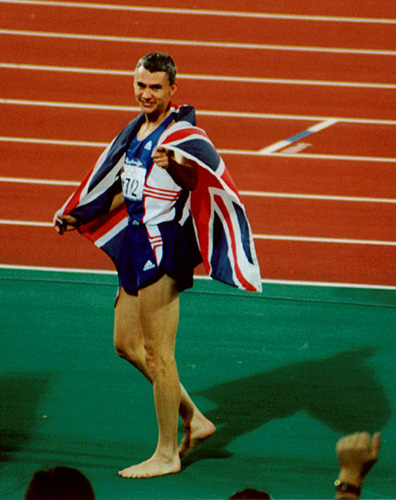
Current triple jump world record holder Jonathan Edwards set the triple jump Commonwealth record in his home nation in 2002.

Statistics are correct as of August 2026

Event	Record	Name	Nation	Date	Games	Ref.
100 m	9.83 (+1.3 m/s) NR	Emmanuel Eseme	Cameroon	28 July 2026	2026 Glasgow	
200 m	19.80 (+1.1 m/s)	Jereem Richards	Trinidad and Tobago	6 August 2022	2022 Birmingham	
400 m	44.24	Kirani James	Grenada	30 July 2014	2014 Glasgow	
800 m	1:43.22	Steve Cram	England	31 July 1986	1986 Edinburgh	
1500 m	3:30.12 PB	Oliver Hoare	Australia	6 August 2022	2022 Birmingham	
Mile	3:53.85	Cameron Myers	Australia	29 July 2026	2026 Glasgow	
5000 m	12:56.41	Augustine Choge	Kenya	20 March 2006	2006 Melbourne	
10,000 m	27:09.19	Jacob Kiplimo	Uganda	2 August 2022	2022 Birmingham	
Marathon	2:09:12 NR (Note: Thompson's run was the British record from 1974 until 1983 when it was beaten by Geoff Smith.)	Ian Thompson	England	31 January 1974	1974 Christchurch	
110 m hurdles	13.08 (+0.5 m/s)	Colin Jackson	Wales	28 January 1990	1990 Auckland	
110 m hurdles	13.08 (+1.6 m/s)	Colin Jackson	Wales	23 August 1994	1994 Victoria	
110 m hurdles	13.08 (+0.9 m/s) PB	Rasheed Broadbell	Jamaica	4 August 2022	2022 Birmingham	
400 m hurdles	48.05 PB	Louis van Zyl	South Africa	23 March 2006	2006 Melbourne	
3000 m steeplechase	8:10.08	Conseslus Kipruto	Kenya	13 April 2018	2018 Gold Coast	
High jump	2.36 m NR	Clarence Saunders	Bermuda	1 February 1990	1990 Auckland	
Pole vault	5.85 m	Kurtis Marschall	Australia	1 August 2026	2026 Glasgow	
Long jump	8.41 m (+0.6 m/s)	Luvo Manyonga	South Africa	11 April 2018	2018 Gold Coast	
Triple jump	17.86 m (+0.7 m/s)	Jonathan Edwards	England	28 July 2002	2002 Manchester	
Shot put	22.45 m	Tomas Walsh	New Zealand	8 April 2018	2018 Gold Coast	
Discus throw	68.20 m	Fedrick Dacres	Jamaica	13 April 2018	2018 Gold Coast	
Hammer throw	80.97 m	Ethan Katzberg	Canada	8 April 2018	2026 Glasgow	
Javelin throw	90.18 m NR	Arshad Nadeem	Pakistan	7 August 2022	2022 Birmingham	
Decathlon	8663 pts	Daley Thompson	England	27–28 July 1986	1986 Edinburgh	
10,000 m walk (track)	38:36.37 NR	Evan Dunfee	Canada	7 August 2022	2022 Birmingham	
20 km walk (road)	1:19:34	Dane Bird-Smith	Australia	8 April 2018	2018 Gold Coast	
50 km walk (road)	3:42:53	Nathan Deakes	Australia	24 March 2006	2006 Melbourne	
4 × 100 m relay	37.58	Usain Bolt; Kemar Bailey-Cole; Nickel Ashmeade; Jason Livermore	Jamaica	2 August 2014	2014 Glasgow	
4 × 400 m relay	2:59.03	Michael McDonald; Roxbert Martin; Gregory Haughton; Davian Clarke	Jamaica	21 September 1998	1998 Kuala Lumpur	

== Women's records ==
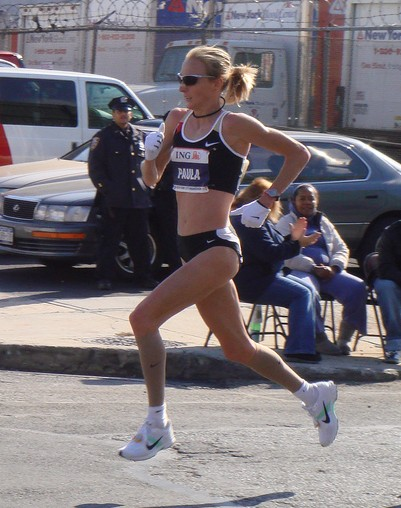
Former Marathon world record holder Paula Radcliffe broke the 5000 m record on home soil in 2002.

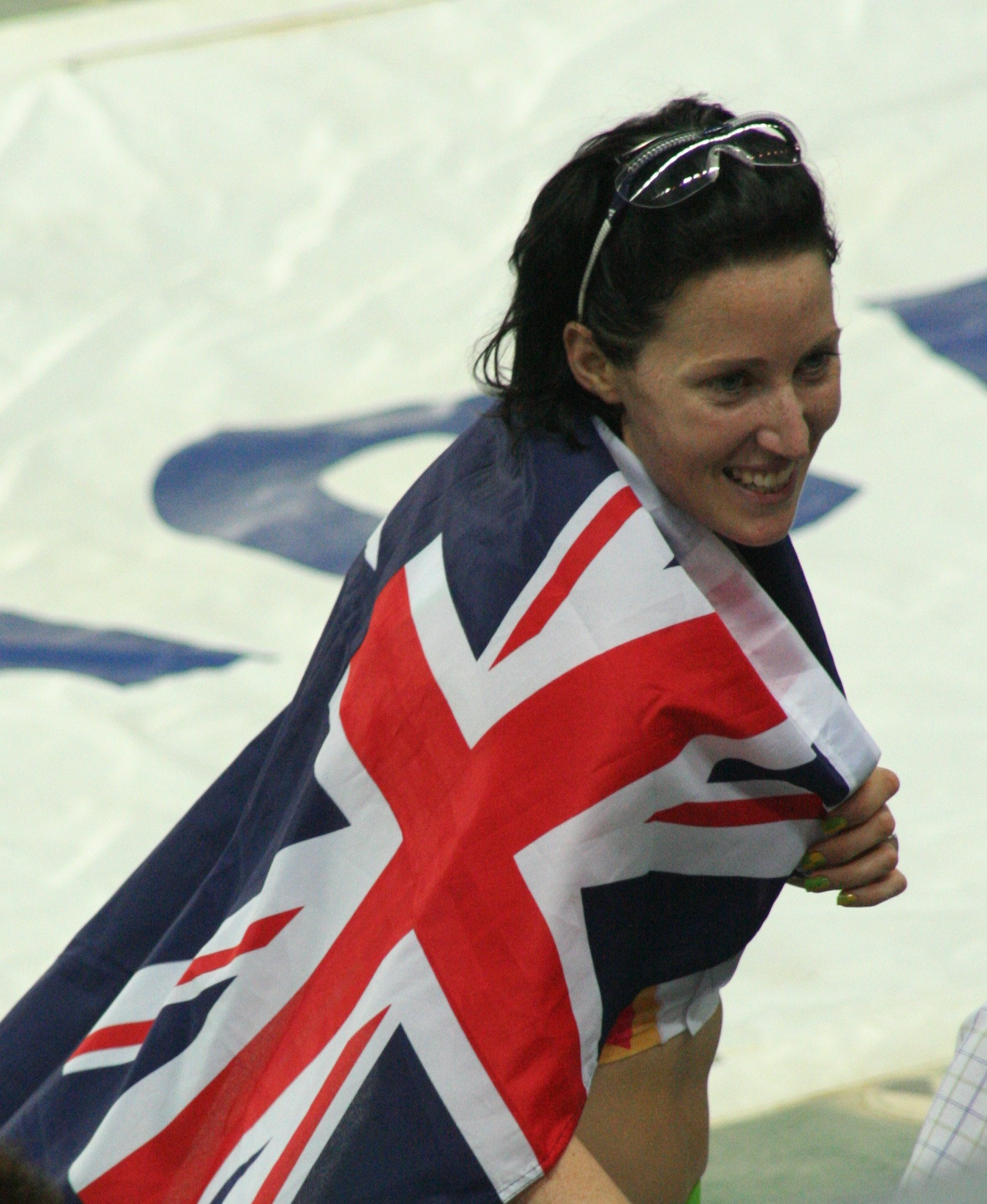
Jana Pittman retained her 400 m hurdles title with a record breaking run.

Statistics are correct as of August 2026

Event	Record	Name	Nation	Date	Games	Ref.
100 m	10.85 (+0.3 m/s)	Blessing Okagbare	Nigeria	28 July 2014	2014 Glasgow	
200 m	22.01 (+1.7 m/s)	Adaejah Hodge	British Virgin Islands	30 July 2026	2026 Glasgow	
400 m	49.90	Sada Williams	Barbados	7 August 2022	2022 Birmingham	
800 m	1:56.68	Caster Semenya	South Africa	13 April 2018	2018 Gold Coast	
1500 m	4:00.71 NR	Caster Semenya	South Africa	10 April 2018	2018 Gold Coast	
Mile	4:31.17	Claudia Hollingsworth	Australia	30 July 2026	2026 Glasgow	
3000 m	8:32.17	Angela Chalmers	Canada	23 August 1994	1994 Victoria	
5000 m	14:31.42 AR	Paula Radcliffe	England	28 July 2002	2002 Manchester	
10,000 m	30:48.50	Eilish McColgan	Scotland	3 August 2022	2022 Birmingham	
Marathon	2:25:28	Lisa Martin	Australia	31 January 1990	1990 Auckland	
100 m hurdles	12.30 (−0.2 m/s)	Tobi Amusan	Nigeria	7 August 2022	2022 Birmingham	
400 m hurdles	53.82	Jana Pittman	Australia	23 March 2006	2006 Melbourne	
3000 m steeplechase	9:01.76	Faith Cherotich	Kenya	29 July 2026	2026 Glasgow	
High jump	1.96 m	Hestrie Cloete	South Africa	30 July 2002	2002 Manchester	
High jump	1.96 m	Eleanor Patterson	Australia	28 July 2026	2026 Glasgow	
Pole vault	4.75 m	Alysha Newman	Canada	13 April 2018	2018 Gold Coast	
Long jump	7.00 m (+1.6 m/s)	Ese Brume	Nigeria	7 August 2022	2022 Birmingham	
Triple jump	14.94 m (+1.4 m/s)	Shanieka Ricketts	Jamaica	5 August 2022	2022 Birmingham	
Shot put	20.47 m	Valerie Adams	New Zealand	9 October 2010	2010 Delhi	
Discus throw	68.26 m	Dani Stevens	Australia	12 April 2018	2018 Gold Coast	
Hammer throw	74.91 m	Camryn Rogers	Canada	28 July 2026	2026 Glasgow	
Javelin throw	68.92 m AR	Kathryn Mitchell	Australia	11 April 2018	2018 Gold Coast	
Javelin throw(old design)	69.80 m	Tessa Sanderson	England	31 July 1986	1986 Edinburgh	
Heptathlon	6695 pts NR	Jane Flemming	Australia	27–28 January 1990	1990 Auckland	
10,000 m walk (track)	42:34.30	Jemima Montag	Australia	6 August 2022	2022 Birmingham	
20 km walk (road)	1:32:46	Jane Saville	Australia	20 March 2006	2006 Melbourne	
4 × 100 m relay	41.83	Kerron Stewart; Veronica Campbell-Brown; Schillonie Calvert; Shelly-Ann Fraser-Pryce	Jamaica	2 August 2014	2014 Glasgow	
4 × 400 m relay	3:23.83	Stephanie McPherson; Christine Day; Novlene Williams-Mills; Anastasia Le-Roy	Jamaica	2 August 2014	2014 Glasgow	

== Mixed ==
Event	Record	Athlete	Nationality	Date	Games	Ref.
4 × 400 m relay	3:10.97	Zandrion Barnes; Leah Anderson; Delano Kennedy; Dejanea Oakley	Jamaica	1 August 2026	2026 Glasgow	

Key:
^{WR} World record	^{AR} Area record	^{NR} National record	^{PB} Athlete's personal best

== Men's para-sports records ==
Event	Record	Name	Nation	Date	Games	Ref.
100 m T11	11.26 (+1.5 m/s)	Ananias Shikongo	Namibia	12 April 2018	2018 Gold Coast	
100 m EAD	10.76	Adekunle Adesoji	Nigeria		2002 Manchester	
100 m T12	10.80 (+1.5 m/s)	Ndodomzi Ntutu	South Africa	12 April 2018	2018 Gold Coast	
100 m T37	11.35 m (+0.8 m/s)	Charl du Toit	South Africa	9 April 2018	2018 Gold Coast	
200 m EAD T46	22.96	Heath Francis	Australia		2006 Melbourne	
800 m wheelchair	1:44.94	Jeff Adams	Canada		1994 Victoria	
1500 m T54	3:05.76	Richard Chiassaro	England	9 April 2018	2018 Gold Coast	
Marathon T54	1:30:26	Kurt Fearnley	Australia	15 April 2018	2018 Gold Coast	
Discus throw seated EAD F55–56	34.48 m	Tanto Campbell	Jamaica		2006 Melbourne	

== Women's para-sports records ==
Event	Record	Name	Nation	Date	Games	Ref.
100 m T38	12.46 (+0.9 m/s)	Sophie Hahn	England	12 April 2018	2018 Gold Coast	
800 m EAD T54	1:48.98	Chantal Petitclerc	Canada		2006 Melbourne	
800 m wheelchair	1:52.93	Chantal Petitclerc	Canada		2002 Manchester	
1500 m T54	3:36.97	Diane Roy	Canada	10 April 2018	2018 Gold Coast	
Long jump T38	4.86 m (+1.4 m/s)	Olivia Breen	Wales	8 April 2018	2018 Gold Coast	
Shot put seated EAD F54–58	9.76 m	Njideka Iyiazi	Nigeria		2006 Melbourne	
Javelin Throw F46	44.43 m	Hollie Arnold	Wales	9 April 2018	2018 Gold Coast	

== See also ==
- List of world records in athletics
- List of Olympic records in athletics
- List of World Championships in Athletics records
