= Swimming at the 2024 Summer Olympics – Men's 100-metre freestyle =

Men's 100 metre freestyle at the Games of the XXXIII Olympiad
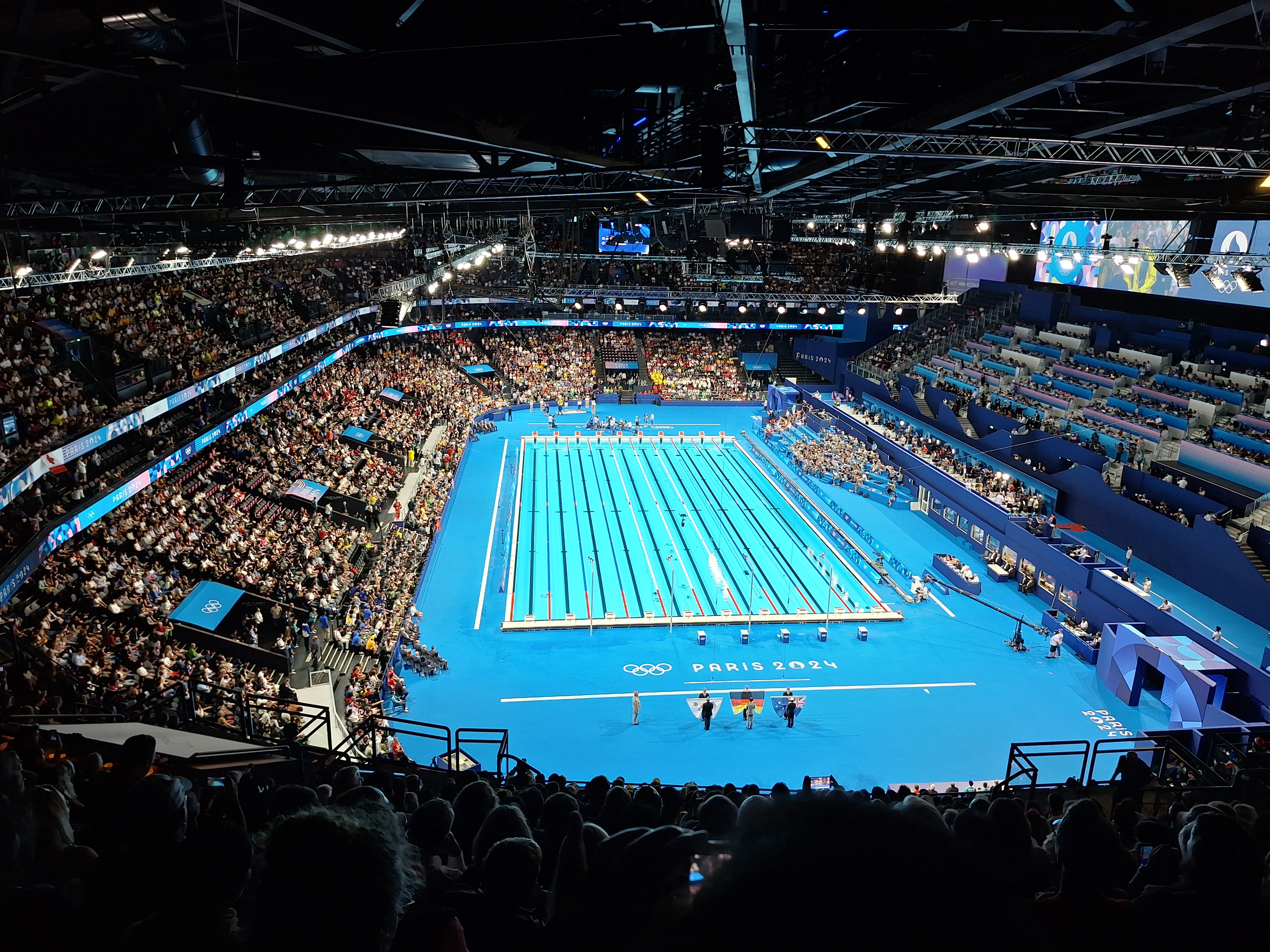
- Paris La Défense Arena after it was converted to a swimming pool for the swimming events
- Venue: Paris La Défense Arena
- Dates: 30 July 2024 (Heats and Semis); 31 July 2024 (Final)
- Competitors: 79 from 70 nations
- Winning time: 46.40 WR

Medalists
1st place, gold medalist(s)		Pan Zhanle	China
2nd place, silver medalist(s)		Kyle Chalmers	Australia
3rd place, bronze medalist(s)		David Popovici	Romania

The men's 100 metre freestyle event at the 2024 Summer Olympics was held on 30 and 31 July 2024 at Paris La Défense Arena, which was converted to a swimming pool for the swimming events.

Romanian David Popovici, China's Pan Zhanle, Australia's Kyle Chalmers, and France's Maxime Grousset were the favourites for the event, and they all progressed through to the final. In the heats, national records for Nepal and Vanuatu were broken.

In the final, Pan swam both the fastest opening split and fastest closing split to win with a new world record of 46.40. Chalmers won silver with 47.48 and Popovici won bronze with 47.49. All eight swimmers finished in under 48 seconds, which had never happened before in an Olympic final, and Pan's swim broke the first swimming world record of these Olympics. It was the biggest margin of victory in the event since the 1928 Olympics, and Pan later called it a "perfect performance".

== Background ==
In 2022, 17-year-old David Popovici of Romania had broken the world record in the event, lowering it to 46.86. Popovici also swam a 46.88 at the 2024 European Championships which was the second fastest qualifying time for the Olympics. At the 2024 World Championships, China's Pan Zhanle broke Popovici's record with a time of 46.80. That time had not been beaten since, and was the fastest qualification time.

Australian Kyle Chalmers was the 2016 Olympic champion and 2020 Olympic silver medallist. He won the World Championships in 2023, where he swam 47.15 to win gold; that time was the fourth fastest qualifying time for the Olympics. The third fastest qualifying time was held by the US' Jack Alexy, who swam 47.08 at the 2024 US Olympic Trials.

Other contenders were Maxime Grousset of France, the 2023 World Championships bronze medallist; Hungary's Nándor Németh, the 2024 World Championships bronze medallist; and Italy's Alessandro Miressi, the 2024 World Championships silver medallist. The US' Olympic champion Caeleb Dressel did not qualify for this event at these Games.

SwimSwam predicted that Chalmers would win, followed by Grousset in second and Popovici in third. Swimming World predicted Popovici would win, followed by Pan in second and Chalmers in third.

== Qualification ==
Each National Olympic Committee (NOC) was permitted to enter a maximum of two qualified athletes in each individual event, but only if both of them had attained the Olympic Qualifying Time (OQT). For this event, the OQT was 48.34 seconds. World Aquatics then considered athletes qualifying through universality; NOCs were given one event entry for each gender, which could be used by any athlete regardless of qualification time, providing the spaces had not already been taken by athletes from that nation who had achieved the OQT. Finally, the rest of the spaces were filled by athletes who had met the Olympic Consideration Time (OCT), which was 48.58 for this event. In total, 32 athletes qualified through achieving the OQT, 46 athletes qualified through universality places and one athlete qualified through achieving the OCT.

Top 10 fastest qualification times
Swimmer	Country	Time	Competition
Pan Zhanle	China	46.80	2024 World Aquatics Championships
David Popovici	Romania	46.88	2024 European Championships
Jack Alexy	United States	47.08	2024 United States Olympic Trials
Kyle Chalmers	Australia	47.15	2023 World Aquatics Championships
Chris Guiliano	United States	47.25	2024 United States Olympic Trials
Maxime Grousset	France	47.33	2024 French Elite Championships
Matthew Richards	Great Britain	47.45	2023 World Aquatics Championships
Nándor Németh	Hungary	47.49	2024 European Championships
Alessandro Miressi	Italy	47.54	2023 World Aquatics Championships
Joshua Liendo	Canada	47.55	2024 Canadian Olympic Trials

== Heats ==
The event was held at Paris La Défense Arena, which was converted to a swimming pool for the swimming events. Ten heats took place on 30 July 2024, starting at 11:17. (Note: All times are Central European Summer Time (UTC+2)) The swimmers with the best 16 times in the heats advanced to the semifinals. Alexy won the eighth heat with the fastest qualifying time of 47.57, while Grousset qualified with the second fastest time of 47.70. Popovici, Németh, Chalmers, Miressi and Pan all qualified. Pan Zhanle qualified with the joint thirteenth fastest qualifying time of 48.40, which SwimSwam commented "wasn’t a great swim" for him. Between the heats and semifinals of this event, Pan broke the event's Olympic record with his split of the 4 × 100 metre freestyle relay.

South Korean Hwang Sun-woo, who qualified with the sixteenth fastest qualifying time, withdrew from the semifinals in favour of resting for the 4 × 200 metre freestyle relay. This allowed Australian William Yang to compete in the semifinals instead. Nepal's Alexander Shah lowered his country's national record to 51.91, Johnathan Silas lowered Vanuatu's national record to 59.38, and Jayhan Odlum-Smith lowered Saint Lucia's national record to 50.39.

Results
Rank	Heat	Lane	Swimmer	Nation	Time	Notes
1	8	4	Jack Alexy	United States	47.57	Q
2	8	5	Maxime Grousset	France	47.70	Q
3	9	4	David Popovici	Romania	47.92	Q
4	9	3	Nándor Németh	Hungary	47.93	Q
5	8	6	Jordan Crooks	Cayman Islands	48.01	Q
6	10	5	Kyle Chalmers	Australia	48.07	Q
7	8	3	Alessandro Miressi	Italy	48.24	Q
8	9	5	Chris Guiliano	United States	48.25	Q
8	10	2	Josha Salchow	Germany	48.25	Q
10	9	6	Andrej Barna	Serbia	48.34	Q
10	10	6	Joshua Liendo	Canada	48.34	Q
12	10	7	Guilherme Caribé	Brazil	48.35	Q
13	8	7	Velimir Stjepanović	Serbia	48.40	Q
13	10	3	Matthew Richards	Great Britain	48.40	Q
13	10	4	Pan Zhanle	China	48.40	Q
16	8	2	Hwang Sun-woo	South Korea	48.41	Q, WD
17	10	8	William Yang	Australia	48.46	q
18	9	1	Jacob Whittle	Great Britain	48.47	
19	7	8	Sergio de Celis	Spain	48.49	
20	8	1	Danas Rapšys	Lithuania	48.53	
21	7	6	Tomer Frankel	Israel	48.66	
22	10	1	Wang Haoyu	China	48.79	
23	7	4	Sean Niewold	Netherlands	48.82	
23	7	5	Rafael Fente-Damers	France	48.82	
23	9	8	Leonardo Deplano	Italy	48.82	
26	5	5	Lamar Taylor	Bahamas	48.84	
26	6	4	Mikel Schreuders	Aruba	48.84	
28	9	7	Diogo Ribeiro	Portugal	48.88	
29	7	2	Yuri Kisil	Canada	49.06	
30	6	5	Ralph Daleiden	Luxembourg	49.12	
31	7	7	Cameron Gray	New Zealand	49.24	
32	7	1	Jorge Iga	Mexico	49.28	
33	8	8	Nikola Miljenić	Croatia	49.34	
34	7	3	Dylan Carter	Trinidad and Tobago	49.35	
35	9	2	Marcelo Chierighini	Brazil	49.38	
36	6	7	Jakub Majerski	Poland	49.44	
37	6	2	Alberto Mestre	Venezuela	49.51	
38	6	3	Jonathan Tan	Singapore	49.60	
39	6	1	Daniel Gracík	Czech Republic	49.65	
40	6	6	Björn Seeliger	Sweden	49.70	
41	6	8	Adilbek Mussin	Kazakhstan	49.92	
42	5	3	Simon Doueihy	Lebanon	50.10	
43	4	1	Nikolas Antoniou	Cyprus	50.35	
44	4	3	Jayhan Odlum-Smith	Saint Lucia	50.39	NR
44	4	5	Yousuf Al-Matrooshi	United Arab Emirates	50.39	NR
46	5	4	Jack Kirby	Barbados	50.42	
47	4	4	Leo Nolles	Uruguay	50.58	
48	5	8	Samyar Abdoli	Iran	50.63	
49	5	6	Dulyawat Kaewsriyong	Thailand	50.64	
50	4	8	Enkhtamir Batbayar	Mongolia	50.81	
51	4	2	Matthieu Seye	Senegal	50.84	
52	4	6	Harry Stacey	Ghana	51.12	
53	3	6	Zaid Al-Sarraj	Saudi Arabia	51.21	
54	4	7	Kyle Abeysinghe	Sri Lanka	51.42	
55	5	7	Ian Ho	Hong Kong	51.46	
56	5	2	Artur Barseghyan	Armenia	51.54	
57	5	1	Javier Núñez	Dominican Republic	51.55	
58	3	4	Adell Sabovic	Kosovo	51.77	NR
59	3	1	Alexander Shah	Nepal	51.91	NR
60	2	5	Ovesh Purahoo	Mauritius	52.22	
61	3	5	Musa Žalaýew	Turkmenistan	52.29	
62	3	7	Grisi Koxhaku	Albania	52.32	
63	3	8	Mohamad Zubaid	Kuwait	52.35	
64	3	3	Henrique Mascarenhas	Angola	52.52	
65	2	4	Nixon Hernández	El Salvador	52.73	
66	3	2	Johann Stickland	Samoa	52.94	
67	2	3	Antoine De Lapparent	Cambodia	52.95	
68	2	2	Irvin Hoost	Suriname	52.99	
69	2	6	Samiul Islam Rafi	Bangladesh	53.10	
70	2	7	Issa Al-Adawi	Oman	53.19	
71	2	1	Collins Saliboko	Tanzania	53.38	
72	1	4	Josh Tarere	Papua New Guinea	53.85	
73	1	6	Phone Pyae Han	Myanmar	55.56	
74	1	3	Sangay Tenzin	Bhutan	56.08	
75	2	8	Yousef Abubaker	Libya	56.19	
76	1	5	Alexien Kouma	Mali	56.34	
77	1	2	Johnathan Silas	Vanuatu	59.38	NR
78	1	7	Giorgio Kamogne	Cameroon	1:03.42	
79	1	1	Hadji Hassane	Comoros	1:07.21	

== Semifinals ==
Two semifinals took place on 30 July, starting at 20:30. The swimmers with the best eight times in the semifinals advanced to the final. Chalmers won the first heat to qualify with the second fastest time of 47.58, while Pan won the second heat to qualify with the fastest time of 47.21. The remaining finalists were: Németh, Grousset, Popovici, Alexy, the US' Chris Guiliano and Germany's Josha Salchow.

Results
Rank	Heat	Lane	Swimmer	Nation	Time	Notes
1	2	8	Pan Zhanle	China	47.21	Q
2	1	3	Kyle Chalmers	Australia	47.58	Q
3	1	5	Nándor Németh	Hungary	47.61	Q
4	1	4	Maxime Grousset	France	47.63	Q
5	2	5	David Popovici	Romania	47.66	Q
6	2	4	Jack Alexy	United States	47.68	Q
7	1	6	Chris Guiliano	United States	47.72	Q
8	2	2	Josha Salchow	Germany	47.94	Q
9	2	6	Alessandro Miressi	Italy	47.95	
10	1	7	Guilherme Caribé	Brazil	48.03	
11	2	7	Josh Liendo	Canada	48.06	
12	1	1	Matthew Richards	Great Britain	48.09	
13	2	3	Jordan Crooks	Cayman Islands	48.10	
14	1	2	Andrej Barna	Serbia	48.11	
15	1	8	William Yang	Australia	48.42	
16	2	1	Velimir Stjepanović	Serbia	48.78	

== Final ==
=== Race ===
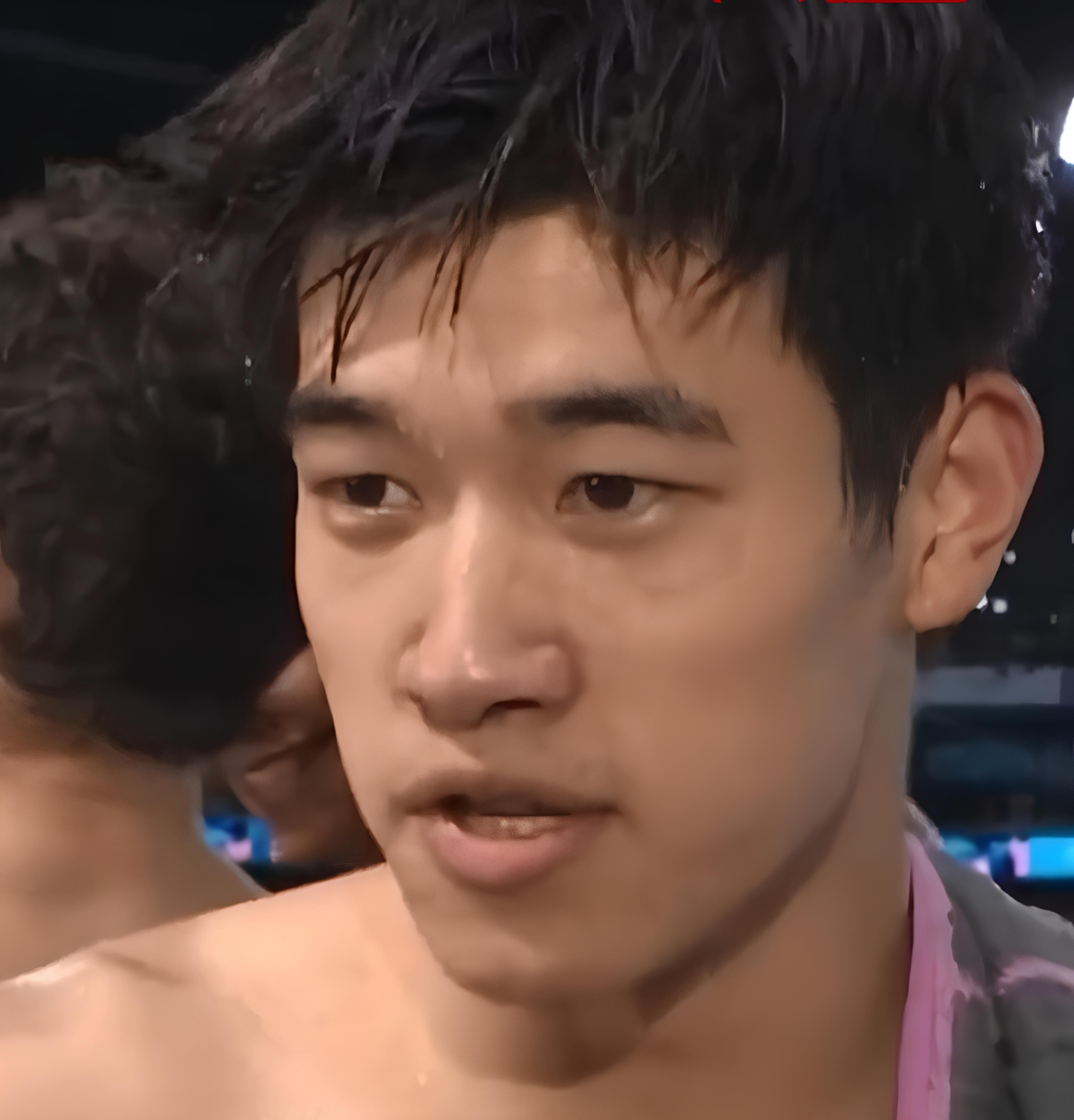
Pan Zhanle at this Olympic Games

The final took place at 22:39 on 31 July. Pan led the race from start to finish to claim a new world record of 46.40, which broke his previous world record of 46.80 set at the 2024 World Championships. He swam both the fastest opening half split of 22.28 and the fastest closing half split of 24.12. Chalmers was last at the halfway turn, but he swam the second fastest closing 50 metres to win silver with 47.48—his third Olympic medal in the event. Popovici finished 0.01 seconds behind Chalmers with 47.49 to win bronze, and Németh finished 0.01 seconds behind Popovici to finish fourth with 47.50. Salchow finished sixth with a German record of 47.80. All eight swimmers finished in under 48 seconds, which had never happened before in an Olympic final, and SwimSwam called it an "unbelievable race".

Pan's swim broke the first swimming world record of these Olympics, which re-ignited discussions over whether the Paris Olympic pool was "slow" or not. It was the biggest margin of victory in the event since the 1928 Olympics, and it was China's first medal in the event. After the race, Pan, through a translator, called the race a "perfect performance".

Results
Rank	Lane	Swimmer	Nation	Time	Notes
1st place, gold medalist(s)	4	Pan Zhanle	China	46.40	WR
2nd place, silver medalist(s)	5	Kyle Chalmers	Australia	47.48	
3rd place, bronze medalist(s)	2	David Popovici	Romania	47.49	
4	3	Nándor Németh	Hungary	47.50	
5	6	Maxime Grousset	France	47.71	
6	8	Josha Salchow	Germany	47.80	NR
7	7	Jack Alexy	United States	47.96	
8	1	Chris Guiliano	United States	47.98	

Statistics
Name	15 metre split (s)	50 metre split (s)	50–65 metre split (s)	Time (s)	Stroke rate (strokes/min)
Pan Zhanle	5.45	22.28	6.57	46.40	51.6
Kyle Chalmers	5.61	23.03	6.60	47.48	52.1
David Popovici	5.66	22.94	6.61	47.49	51.7
Nándor Németh	5.61	22.90	6.71	47.50	54.8
Maxime Grousset	5.33	22.61	6.60	47.71	53.0
Josha Salchow	5.62	22.93	6.88	47.80	50.6
Jack Alexy	5.55	22.63	6.82	47.96	48.0
Chris Guiliano	5.40	22.82	6.67	47.98	49.6
