= Swimming at the 2024 World Aquatics Championships – Men's 100 metre freestyle =

Men's 100 metre freestyle at the Swimming at the 2024 World Aquatics Championships
- Venue: Aspire Dome
- Location: Doha, Qatar
- Dates: 14 February (heats and semifinals); 15 February (final)
- Competitors: 108 from 104 nations
- Winning time: 47.53

Medalists
gold medal	Pan Zhanle	China
silver medal	Alessandro Miressi	Italy
bronze medal	Nándor Németh	Hungary

The Men's 100 metre freestyle competition at the 2024 World Aquatics Championships was held on 14 and 15 February 2024.

== Qualification ==
Each National Federation was permitted to enter a maximum of two qualified athletes in each individual event, but only if both of them had attained the "A" standard qualification time at approved qualifying events. For this event, the "A" standard qualification time was 48.51 seconds. Federations could enter one athlete into the event if they met the "B" standard qualification time. For this event, the "B" standard qualification time was 50.21. Athletes could also enter the event if they had met an "A" or "B" standard in a different event and their Federation had not entered anyone else. Additional considerations applied to Federations who had few swimmers enter through the standard qualification times. Federations in this category could at least enter two men and two women into the competition, all of whom could enter into up to two events.

== Records ==
Prior to the competition, the existing world and championship records were as follows.

World record	David Popovici (ROU)	46.86	Rome, Italy	13 August 2022
Competition record	César Cielo (BRA)	46.91	Rome, Italy	30 July 2009

The following records were established during the competition:

Date	Round	Name	Nationality	Time	Record
11 February	Final*	Pan Zhanle	China	46.80	WR

* Split from the men's 4 × 100 m freestyle relay

== Results ==
=== Heats ===
The heats were started on 14 February at 09:45.

Rank	Heat	Lane	Name	Nationality	Time	Notes
1	10	4	Pan Zhanle	China	47.82	Q
2	11	4	Alessandro Miressi	Italy	47.94	Q
3	12	5	Nándor Németh	Hungary	48.03	Q
4	12	4	Matt Richards	Great Britain	48.05	Q
5	10	5	Matt King	United States	48.11	Q
6	11	3	Hwang Sun-woo	South Korea	48.15	Q
7	10	3	Andrej Barna	Serbia	48.31	Q
8	11	7	Mikel Schreuders	Aruba	48.59	Q
9	11	6	Wang Haoyu	China	48.61	Q
10	11	2	Manuel Frigo	Italy	48.65	Q
11	11	1	Sergio De Celis Montalbán	Spain	48.68	Q
12	12	3	Diogo Ribeiro	Portugal	48.72	Q
13	12	6	Cameron Gray	New Zealand	48.81	Q
14	11	8	Björn Seeliger	Sweden	48.84	Q
15	12	2	Kai Taylor	Australia	48.88	Q
16	12	1	Kamil Sieradzki	Poland	48.93	Q
17	11	5	Jack Cartwright	Australia	49.01	
18	11	0	Chad le Clos	South Africa	49.04	
19	12	0	Alberto Mestre	Venezuela	49.09	
20	10	6	Szebasztián Szabó	Hungary	49.10	
21	9	7	Matej Duša	Slovakia	49.12	NR
22	10	7	Heiko Gigler	Austria	49.16	
23	10	9	Tomas Lukminas	Lithuania	49.18	
24	10	2	Javier Acevedo	Canada	49.19	
24	10	0	Shane Ryan	Ireland	49.19	
26	11	9	Vladyslav Bukhov	Ukraine	49.24	
27	10	8	Breno Correia	Brazil	49.29	
28	12	8	Jonathan Tan	Singapore	49.32	
29	10	1	Jorge Iga	Mexico	49.35	
30	9	6	Wesley Roberts	Cook Islands	49.41	
31	12	9	Adilbek Mussin	Kazakhstan	49.45	
32	12	7	Denis Loktev	Israel	49.50	
33	9	3	Patrick Dinu	Romania	49.53	
34	9	8	Kaloyan Bratanov	Bulgaria	49.67	
35	9	1	Artur Barseghyan	Armenia	50.19	
36	9	4	Dulyawat Kaewsriyong	Thailand	50.35	
37	7	6	Yousuf Al-Matrooshi	United Arab Emirates	50.49	
38	8	7	Javier Núñez	Dominican Republic	50.54	
39	9	9	Tanish Mathew	India	50.58	
40	8	3	Leo Nolles	Uruguay	50.73	
41	3	9	Kyle Abeysinghe	Sri Lanka	50.99	
42	8	6	Marvin Johnson	Bahamas	51.01	
43	8	5	Joe Kurniawan	Indonesia	51.15	
44	6	4	Benjamin Schnapp	Chile	51.29	
45	8	4	Samyar Abdoli	Iran	51.35	
46	7	4	Isaac Beitia	Panama	51.40	
47	7	5	Matthieu Seye	Senegal	51.47	
47	9	0	Adi Mešetović	Bosnia and Herzegovina	51.47	
49	8	8	Emad Zapen	Jordan	51.53	
50	7	1	Enkhtamir Batbayar	Mongolia	51.55	
50	8	1	Jayhan Odlum-Smith	Saint Lucia	51.55	
52	5	5	Mohamed Mahmoud	Qatar	51.71	
53	8	9	Reds Rullis	Latvia	51.72	
54	8	2	James Allison	Cayman Islands	51.75	
55	9	2	Ian Ho	Hong Kong	51.77	
55	6	3	Hansel McCaig	Fiji	51.77	
57	7	2	Egor Covaliov	Moldova	51.94	
58	1	3	Zaid Al-Sarraj	Saudi Arabia	52.04	
58	7	7	Musa Zhalayev	Turkmenistan	52.04	
60	8	0	Alaa Maso	Athlete Refugee Team	52.05	
61	3	0	Alex Sobers	Barbados	52.09	
62	5	4	Alexander Shah	Nepal	52.17	NR
62	6	8	Grisi Koxhaku	Albania	52.17	
64	7	0	Colins Ebingha	Nigeria	52.19	
65	5	3	Mohamad Zubaid	Kuwait	52.21	
66	6	5	Johann Stickland	Samoa	52.33	
67	6	7	Nixon Hernández	El Salvador	52.41	
68	2	2	Bernat Lomero	Andorra	52.53	
69	6	0	Ovesh Purahoo	Mauritius	52.55	
70	4	2	Raekwon Noel	Guyana	52.59	
71	6	6	Henrique Mascernhas	Angola	52.62	
72	6	2	Tendo Mukalazi	Uganda	52.63	
73	6	9	Ridhwan Mohamed	Kenya	52.71	
75	7	3	Stefano Mitchell	Antigua and Barbuda	52.86	
74	7	8	Sidrell Williams	Jamaica	52.76	
76	7	9	Yazan Al-Bawwab	Palestine	52.93	
77	5	6	José Alberto Quintanilla	Bolivia	53.08	
78	5	2	Issa Al-Adawi	Oman	53.29	
79	5	7	Syed Muhammad Haseeb Tariq	Pakistan	54.05	
80	5	1	Finau Ohuafi	Tonga	54.09	
81	6	1	Luka Kukhalashvili	Georgia	54.41	
82	3	7	Osama Trabulsi	Syria	54.49	
83	4	4	Josh Tarere	Papua New Guinea	54.72	
84	3	6	James Hendrix	Guam	55.03	
85	2	8	Alexien Kouma	Mali	55.13	
85	5	8	Jeno Heyns	Suriname	55.13	
87	5	0	Belly-Cresus Ganira	Burundi	55.29	
88	5	9	Haziq Samil	Brunei	55.36	
89	4	3	Sangay Tenzin	Bhutan	55.42	
90	4	5	Phansovannarun Montross	Cambodia	55.48	
91	2	6	Siraj Al-Sharif	Libya	56.27	
92	4	6	Cedrick Niyibizi	Rwanda	56.64	
93	4	7	Michael Joseph	Tanzania	57.30	
94	3	8	Jefferson Kpanou	Benin	57.54	
95	2	0	Camil Doua	Mauritania	57.80	
96	2	4	Asher Banda	Malawi	1:00.03	
97	4	1	Edgar Iro	Solomon Islands	1:00.62	
98	3	4	Elhadj Diallo	Guinea	1:01.68	
99	4	0	Johnathan Silas	Vanuatu	1:01.86	NR
100	4	8	Phillip Kinono	Marshall Islands	1:01.92	
101	1	5	Nguichie Ga	Cameroon	1:02.20	
102	4	9	Christian Nortey	Ghana	1:02.39	
103	1	4	Magnim Daou	Togo	1:02.48	
104	3	1	Ousman Jobe	Gambia	1:03.76	
105	2	3	Aseel Khousrof	Yemen	1:04.61	
106	3	2	Troy Nisbett	Saint Kitts and Nevis	1:05.84	
107	3	5	Jolanio Guterres	Timor-Leste	1:09.84	
108	2	1	Marouane Mamane	Niger	1:15.54	
	2	5	Jainny Pinto	São Tomé and Príncipe	Did not start	
	2	7	Freddy Mayala	Congo	Did not start	
	9	5	Kregor Zirk	Estonia	Did not start	
	3	3	Pedro Rogery	Guinea-Bissau	Disqualified	

=== Semifinals ===
The semifinals were started on 14 February at 19:26.

Rank	Heat	Lane	Name	Nationality	Time	Notes
1	2	4	Pan Zhanle	China	47.73	Q
2	1	4	Alessandro Miressi	Italy	47.88	Q
3	1	3	Hwang Sun-woo	South Korea	47.93	Q
4	2	5	Nándor Németh	Hungary	47.96	Q
5	2	6	Andrej Barna	Serbia	48.05	Q
6	2	2	Wang Haoyu	China	48.11	Q
7	2	3	Matt King	United States	48.17	Q
8	1	5	Matt Richards	Great Britain	48.22	Q
9	1	2	Manuel Frigo	Italy	48.25	
10	2	7	Sergio De Celis Montalbán	Spain	48.39	NR
11	1	7	Diogo Ribeiro	Portugal	48.44	
12	1	6	Mikel Schreuders	Aruba	48.46	
13	2	8	Kai Taylor	Australia	48.50	
14	2	1	Cameron Gray	New Zealand	48.73	
15	1	8	Kamil Sieradzki	Poland	48.80	
16	1	1	Björn Seeliger	Sweden	48.84	

=== Final ===
The final was held on 15 February at 19:21.

Rank	Lane	Name	Nationality	Time	Notes
1st place, gold medalist(s)	4	Pan Zhanle	China	47.53	
2nd place, silver medalist(s)	5	Alessandro Miressi	Italy	47.72	
3rd place, bronze medalist(s)	6	Nándor Németh	Hungary	47.78	
4	8	Matt Richards	Great Britain	47.82	
5	3	Hwang Sun-woo	South Korea	47.93	
6	2	Andrej Barna	Serbia	48.02	
7	1	Matt King	United States	48.06	
7	7	Wang Haoyu	China	48.06	

== Sources ==
- "Competition Regulations" (PDF). World Aquatics. Archived (PDF) from the original on 15 February 2026.
