= 2022 FINA World Swimming Championships (25 m) – Men's 100 metre freestyle =

Swimming competition

Men's 100 metre freestyle at the 2022 FINA World Swimming Championships (25 m)
- Venue: Melbourne Sports and Aquatic Centre
- Location: Melbourne, Australia
- Dates: 14 December (heats and semifinals); 15 December (final)
- Competitors: 84 from 76 nations
- Winning time: 45.16 CR

Medalists
gold medal	Kyle Chalmers	Australia
silver medal	Maxime Grousset	France
bronze medal	Alessandro Miressi	Italy

The Men's 100 metre freestyle competition of the 2022 FINA World Swimming Championships (25 m) was held on 14 and 15 December 2022.

== Records ==
Prior to the competition, the existing world and championship records were as follows.

World record	Kyle Chalmers (AUS)	44.84	Kazan, Russia	29 October 2021
Competition record	Vladimir Morozov (RUS)	45.51	Doha, Qatar	3 December 2014

The following new records were set during this competition:

Date	Event	Name	Nationality	Time	Record
15 December	Final	Kyle Chalmers	Australia	45.16	CR

== Results ==
=== Heats ===
The heats were started on 14 December at 12:03.

Rank	Heat	Lane	Name	Nationality	Time	Notes
1	6	6	Jordan Crooks	Cayman Islands	45.61	Q, NR
2	9	4	Maxime Grousset	France	45.77	Q
3	11	4	Kyle Chalmers	Australia	45.84	Q
4	9	6	David Popovici	Romania	46.15	Q, NR
5	10	4	Alessandro Miressi	Italy	46.22	Q
6	9	5	Hwang Sun-woo	South Korea	46.36	Q
7	11	5	Thomas Ceccon	Italy	46.41	Q
8	11	1	Youssef Ramadan	Egypt	46.51	Q, NR
9	8	2	Tom Dean	Great Britain	46.54	Q
10	10	6	Heiko Gigler	Austria	46.64	Q, NR
11	10	5	Pan Zhanle	China	46.79	Q
12	7	1	Sergio de Celis	Spain	46.80	Q
13	8	6	Lewis Burras	Great Britain	46.92	Q
14	11	6	Pedro Spajari	Brazil	46.94	Q
15	10	2	Matthew Temple	Australia	46.98	Q
16	10	1	Mikel Schreuders	Aruba	47.03	Q
17	9	2	Drew Kibler	United States	47.05	
18	10	8	Szebasztián Szabó	Hungary	47.09	
19	7	4	Hunter Armstrong	United States	47.11	
19	9	7	Karol Ostrowski	Poland	47.11	
19	10	7	Josha Salchow	Germany	47.11	
22	11	7	Katsuhiro Matsumoto	Japan	47.13	
23	10	3	Gabriel Santos	Brazil	47.14	
24	11	2	Wang Haoyu	China	47.17	
25	6	7	Deniel Nankov	Bulgaria	47.30	NR
25	7	7	Ruslan Gaziev	Canada	47.30	
27	9	8	Carter Swift	New Zealand	47.36	
28	11	8	Yuri Kisil	Canada	47.40	
29	9	1	Daniel Zaitsev	Estonia	47.46	
30	8	5	Nikola Miljenić	Croatia	47.51	
31	8	7	Nicholas Lia	Norway	47.55	NR
32	11	3	Stan Pijnenburg	Netherlands	47.56	
33	8	1	Ian Ho	Hong Kong	47.61	
34	8	4	Isak Eliasson	Sweden	47.73	
35	6	3	Matej Duša	Slovakia	47.75	NR
36	5	4	Lamar Taylor	Bahamas	47.76	NR
37	9	3	Katsumi Nakamura	Japan	47.79	
38	7	8	Aleksey Tarasenko	Uzbekistan	47.82	NR
39	8	8	Illia Linnyk	Ukraine	47.99	
40	7	5	Clayton Jimmie	South Africa	48.09	
41	7	6	Daniel Gracík	Czech Republic	48.14	
42	6	4	Meiron Cheruti	Israel	48.20	
43	8	3	Velimir Stjepanović	Serbia	48.42	
44	7	2	Xander Skinner	Namibia	48.45	
45	7	3	Ben Hockin	Paraguay	48.48	
46	5	6	Adi Mešetović	Bosnia and Herzegovina	48.97	
47	5	5	Wesley Roberts	Cook Islands	49.59	NR
47	6	8	Denzel González	Dominican Republic	49.59	NR
49	5	8	Hansell McCaig	Fiji	49.73	NR
50	4	1	Miguel Vázquez	Guatemala	49.77	NR
51	4	6	Omar Abbass	Syria	50.01	NR
52	6	2	Pedro Chiancone	Uruguay	50.28	
53	5	3	Tomàs Lomero	Andorra	50.32	NR
54	4	3	Jeancarlo Calderon	Panama	50.54	
55	4	8	Salem Sabt	United Arab Emirates	50.58	
56	6	1	Luka Kukhalashvili	Georgia	50.59	NR
57	5	2	Esteban Núñez	Bolivia	50.76	
58	4	2	Batbayaryn Enkhtamir	Mongolia	50.87	NR
59	4	5	Issa Al-Adawi	Oman	51.05	
60	5	1	James Freeman	Botswana	51.08	
61	4	4	Leon Seaton	Guyana	51.24	NR
62	3	4	Collins Saliboko	Tanzania	51.50	
63	3	2	Ahmed Al-Hasani	Iraq	51.96	
64	4	7	Paolo Priska	Albania	52.18	
65	3	8	Martin Muja	Kosovo	52.28	
66	1	1	Mahmoud Abu Gharbieh	Palestine	52.33	
67	3	1	Md Asif Reza	Bangladesh	52.91	
67	3	5	Finau Ohuafi	Tonga	52.91	
69	2	5	Matt Savitz	Gibraltar	53.37	
70	3	3	Marc Dansou	Benin	53.46	
71	3	7	Abdalla El-Ghamry	Qatar	53.57	
72	2	4	Jake Chee-A-Tow	Barbados	53.62	
73	1	4	Clinton Opute	Nigeria	53.66	
74	2	6	Josh Tarere	Papua New Guinea	54.13	
75	3	6	Jinnosuke Suzuki	Northern Mariana Islands	54.48	
76	2	7	Mohamad Zubaid	Kuwait	54.95	
77	1	8	Sangay Tenzin	Bhutan	55.46	
78	2	3	Cedrick Niyibizi	Rwanda	55.87	
79	1	2	Ervin Shrestha	Nepal	56.87	
80	2	2	Edgar Iro	Solomon Islands	58.43	
81	2	1	Shawn Dingilius-Wallace	Palau	58.57	
82	2	8	Kyler Kihleng	Federated States of Micronesia	58.58	
83	1	5	Phillip Kinono	Marshall Islands	1:01.29	
84	1	6	Jolanio Guterres	Timor-Leste	1:10.23	
	1	3	Hugo Nguichie	Cameroon	Did not start	
	1	7	Fodé Camara	Guinea	Did not start	
	5	7	Bradley Vincent	Mauritius	Did not start	
	6	5	Sina Gholampour	Iran	Did not start	

=== Semifinals ===
The semifinals were started on 14 December at 20:08.

Rank	Heat	Lane	Name	Nationality	Time	Notes
1	2	4	Jordan Crooks	Cayman Islands	45.55	Q, NR
2	1	4	Maxime Grousset	France	45.58	Q
3	2	5	Kyle Chalmers	Australia	45.66	Q
4	2	3	Alessandro Miressi	Italy	45.74	Q
5	1	5	David Popovici	Romania	45.91	Q, WJ, NR
6	2	6	Thomas Ceccon	Italy	46.13	Q
7	2	7	Pan Zhanle	China	46.19	Q
8	2	2	Tom Dean	Great Britain	46.20	Q
9	1	3	Hwang Sun-woo	South Korea	46.41	
10	1	6	Youssef Ramadan	Egypt	46.57	
11	1	7	Sergio de Celis	Spain	46.60	
12	2	1	Lewis Burras	Great Britain	46.61	
13	2	8	Matthew Temple	Australia	46.63	
14	1	2	Heiko Gigler	Austria	46.92	
15	1	8	Mikel Schreuders	Aruba	47.12	
16	1	1	Pedro Spajari	Brazil	47.32	

=== Final ===
The final was held on 15 December at 19:42.

Rank	Lane	Name	Nationality	Time	Notes
1st place, gold medalist(s)	3	Kyle Chalmers	Australia	45.16	CR
2nd place, silver medalist(s)	5	Maxime Grousset	France	45.41	
3rd place, bronze medalist(s)	6	Alessandro Miressi	Italy	45.57	=NR
4	2	David Popovici	Romania	45.64	WJ, NR
5	7	Thomas Ceccon	Italy	45.72	
6	1	Pan Zhanle	China	45.77	AS
6	4	Jordan Crooks	Cayman Islands	45.77	
8	8	Tom Dean	Great Britain	46.11	
