= Swimming at the 2024 Summer Olympics – Men's 4 × 100-metre freestyle relay =

Men's 4 × 100 metre freestyle relay at the Games of the XXXIII Olympiad
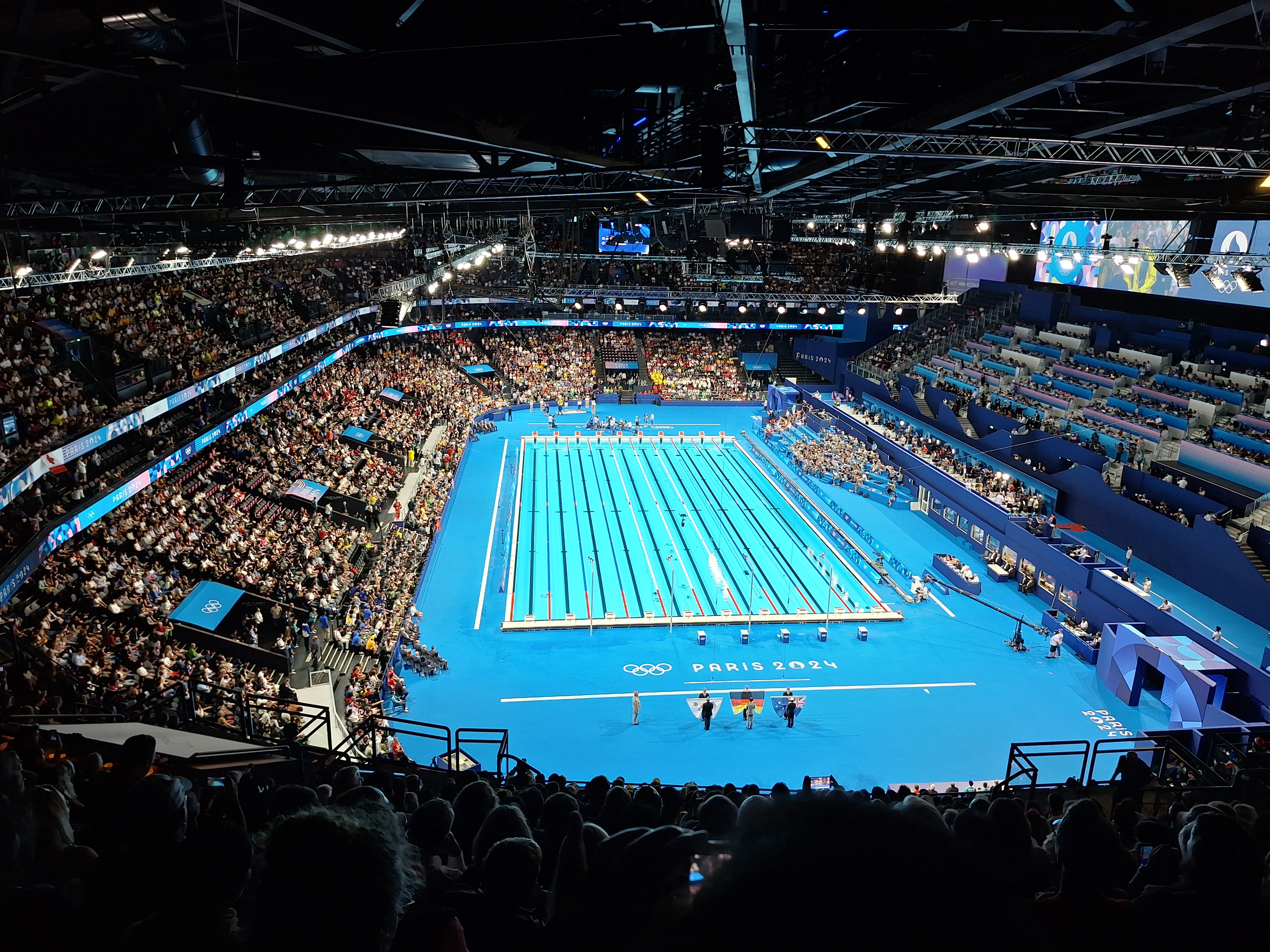
- Paris La Défense Arena after it was converted to a swimming pool for the swimming events
- Venue: Paris La Défense Arena
- Dates: 27 July 2024 (heats and final)
- Competitors: 70 from 16 nations
- Teams: 16 teams
- Winning time: 3:09.28

Medalists
1st place, gold medalist(s)		Jack Alexy, Chris Guiliano, Hunter Armstrong, Caeleb Dressel, Ryan Held*, Matthew King*	United States
2nd place, silver medalist(s)		Jack Cartwright, Flynn Southam, Kai Taylor, Kyle Chalmers, William Yang*	Australia
3rd place, bronze medalist(s)		Alessandro Miressi, Thomas Ceccon, Paolo Conte Bonin, Manuel Frigo, Lorenzo Zazzeri*, Leonardo Deplano* *Indicates the swimmer only competed in the preliminary heats.	Italy

The men's 4 × 100 metre freestyle relay event at the 2024 Summer Olympics was held on 27 July 2024 at Paris La Défense Arena, which was converted to a swimming pool for the swimming events.

The United States were considered the most likely to win the event by SwimSwam and Swimming World, though Australia, China and Great Britain were also considered likely to win medals. All four nations progressed to the final.

In the final, the US recorded 3:09.28 to win their first gold medal of the 2024 Games, with Australia taking silver with 3:10.35 and Italy winning bronze with 3:10.70. Pan Zhanle of China set a new 100 metre freestyle Olympic record of 46.92 on the first leg, however, China finished fourth overall.

== Background ==
The United States won the event at the previous Olympics, and won the event at the 2022 World Championships. Australia won the event at the 2023 World Championships and China won it at the 2024 World Championships. In the heats (preliminary rounds) of the 2023 World Championships, Great Britain registered the fastest time but were disqualified due to one of their swimmers starting just before the other one finished.

Both SwimSwam and Swimming World predicted the US would win, Great Britain would come second and Australia would come third.

The event was held at Paris La Défense Arena, which was converted to a swimming pool for the swimming events.

== Qualification ==
Each National Olympic Committee could enter one team, and there were a total of sixteen qualifications places available. The first three qualifying places were taken by the podium finishers at the 2023 World Championships, and the final thirteen qualifying places were allocated to the fastest performances at the 2023 and 2024 World Championships.

== Heats ==
Two heats (preliminary rounds) took place on 27 July 2024, starting at 12:26. (Note: All times are Central European Summer Time (UTC+2)) The teams with the best eight times in the heats advanced to the final. China won the first heat with the fastest qualifying time of 3:11.62, with Pan Zhanle of China swimming the fastest individual time of 46.98. Australia won the second heat with the second fastest qualifying time of 3:12.25. Great Britain, the US, Canada, Italy, Hungary and Germany were also among those that qualified, with Germany setting a new national record of 3:13.15. Spain also set a new national record of 3:13.19, but it was not fast enough to qualify.

Results
Rank	Heat	Lane	Nation	Swimmers	Time	Notes
1	1	5	China	Wang Haoyu (48.61); Chen Juner (48.10); Ji Xinjie (47.93); Pan Zhanle (46.98)	3:11.62	Q
2	2	4	Australia	Jack Cartwright (48.51); William Yang (48.39); Flynn Southam (47.91); Kyle Chalmers (47.44)	3:12.25	Q
3	1	3	Great Britain	Duncan Scott (48.61); Jacob Whittle (47.90); Alexander Cohoon (47.91); Tom Dean (48.07)	3:12.49	Q
4	2	5	United States	Ryan Held (48.52); Matthew King (48.40); Hunter Armstrong (47.50); Caeleb Dressel (48.19)	3:12.61	Q
5	2	3	Canada	Finlay Knox (49.03); Yuri Kisil (48.34); Javier Acevedo (48.15); Joshua Liendo (47.25)	3:12.77	Q
6	1	4	Italy	Lorenzo Zazzeri (48.88); Leonardo Deplano (48.23); Paolo Conte Bonin (48.03); Manuel Frigo (47.80)	3:12.94	Q
7	1	6	Hungary	Nándor Németh (48.07); Szebasztián Szabó (48.02); Adam Jaszo (48.74); Hubert Kós (48.13)	3:12.96	Q
8	1	7	Germany	Josha Salchow (48.56); Rafael Miroslaw (47.87); Luca Armbruster (48.29); Peter Varjasi (48.43)	3:13.15	Q, NR
9	1	2	Spain	Sergio de Celis (48.84); Luis Domínguez (48.27); César Castro (47.91); Mario Molla (48.17)	3:13.19	NR
10	2	6	Brazil	Guilherme Caribé (48.57); Marcelo Chierighini (48.21); Gabriel Santos (48.86); Breno Correia (48.58)	3:14.22	
11	2	1	Serbia	Velimir Stjepanović (49.10); Nikola Aćin (48.66); Justin Cvetkov (49.44); Andrej Barna (47.48)	3:14.68	
12	1	1	France	Hadrien Salvan (49.21); Rafael Fente-Damers (48.34); Guillaume Guth (48.66); Wissam-Amazigh Yebba (48.63)	3:14.84	
13	1	8	Poland	Mateusz Chowaniec (49.13); Dominik Dudys (48.75); Bartosz Piszczorowicz (48.39); Kamil Sieradzki (48.67)	3:14.94	
14	2	7	Israel	Tomer Frankel (48.60); Gal Cohen Groumi (48.22); Denis Loktev (48.87); Alexey Glivinskiy (49.72)	3:15.41	
15	2	8	Sweden	Robin Hanson (49.09); Björn Seeliger (48.61); Elias Persson (48.71); Isak Eliasson (49.30)	3:15.71	
16	2	2	Greece	Andreas Vazaios (49.50); Panagiotis Bolanos (49.68); Stergios Bilas (48.70); Odysseus Meladinis (49.59)	3:17.47	

== Final ==
The final took place at 21:44 on 27 July. China's Pan Zhanle set a new 100 metres freestyle Olympic record of 46.92 as China's first swimmer. The US was ahead after the second swimmers had swum, and they maintained their lead to the finish to win with a time of 3:09.28. Australia won silver with 3:10.35, Italy won bronze with 3:10.70, and China placed fourth with 3:11.28. Germany finished in seventh, setting a new national record of 3:12.29. The win gave the US their first gold of the 2024 Games.

Results
Rank	Lane	Nation	Swimmers	Time	Notes
1st place, gold medalist(s)	6	United States	Jack Alexy (47.67); Chris Guiliano (47.33); Hunter Armstrong (46.75); Caeleb Dressel (47.53)	3:09.28	
2nd place, silver medalist(s)	5	Australia	Jack Cartwright (48.03); Flynn Southam (48.00); Kai Taylor (47.73); Kyle Chalmers (46.59)	3:10.35	
3rd place, bronze medalist(s)	7	Italy	Alessandro Miressi (48.04); Thomas Ceccon (47.44); Paolo Conte Bonin (48.16); Manuel Frigo (47.06)	3:10.70	
4	4	China	Pan Zhanle (46.92) OR; Ji Xinjie (48.58); Chen Juner (48.10); Wang Haoyu (47.68)	3:11.28	
5	3	Great Britain	Matt Richards (47.83); Jacob Whittle (48.54); Tom Dean (47.72); Duncan Scott (47.52)	3:11.61	
6	2	Canada	Josh Liendo (47.93); Yuri Kisil (48.18); Finlay Knox (48.26); Javier Acevedo (47.81)	3:12.18	
7	8	Germany	Josha Salchow (48.28); Rafael Miroslaw (47.66); Luca Armbruster (48.43); Peter Varjasi (47.92)	3:12.29	NR
8	1	Hungary	Nándor Németh (47.76); Szebasztián Szabó (48.46); Ádám Jászó (48.38); Hubert Kós (48.51)	3:13.11	
