= Swimming at the 2023 World Aquatics Championships – Men's 4 × 100 metre freestyle relay =

Men's 4 × 100 metre freestyle relay at the 2023 World Aquatics Championships
- Venue: Marine Messe Fukuoka
- Location: Fukuoka, Japan
- Dates: 23 July (heats and final)
- Competitors: 94 from 22 nations
- Teams: 22
- Winning time: 3:10.16

Medalists
gold medal	Jack Cartwright; Flynn Southam; Kai Taylor; Kyle Chalmers; Matthew Temple	Australia
silver medal	Alessandro Miressi; Manuel Frigo; Lorenzo Zazzeri; Thomas Ceccon; Leonardo Deplano	Italy
bronze medal	Ryan Held; Jack Alexy; Chris Guiliano; Matt King; Destin Lasco; Justin Ress	United States

The men's 4 × 100 metre freestyle relay competition at the 2023 World Aquatics Championships will be held on 23 July 2023.

== Records ==
Prior to the competition, the existing world and championship records were as follows.

World record	United States; Michael Phelps (47.51); Garrett Weber-Gale (47.02); Cullen Jones (47.65); Jason Lezak (46.06)	3:08.24	Beijing, China	11 August 2008
Competition record	United States; Caeleb Dressel (47.63); Blake Pieroni (47.49); Zach Apple (46.86); Nathan Adrian (47.08)	3:09.06	Gwangju, South Korea	21 July 2019

== Results ==
=== Heats ===
The heats were held at 13:14.

Rank	Heat	Lane	Nation	Swimmers	Time	Notes
1	3	4	United States	Chris Guiliano (48.30); Destin Lasco (47.95); Matt King (47.50); Justin Ress (47.88)	3:11.63	Q
2	3	5	Australia	Jack Cartwright (48.29); Matthew Temple (48.19); Kai Taylor (47.59); Flynn Southam (47.57)	3:11.64	Q
3	2	4	Italy	Alessandro Miressi (48.10); Leonardo Deplano (48.42); Lorenzo Zazzeri (47.91); Manuel Frigo (48.10)	3:12.53	Q
4	2	3	Canada	Ruslan Gaziev (48.38); Javier Acevedo (48.55); Édouard Fullum-Huot (48.96); Joshua Liendo (47.60)	3:13.49	Q
5	3	7	China	Wang Haoyu (48.37); Chen Juner (48.26); Yang Jintong (49.54); Pan Zhanle (47.37)	3:13.54	Q
6	2	6	Spain	Sergio de Celis (48.81); Luis Domínguez (48.39); Mario Mollà (48.63); César Castro (47.94)	3:13.77	Q
7	3	6	Brazil	Marcelo Chierighini (48.87); Guilherme Caribé (47.84); Felipe Ribeiro (48.34); Victor Alcará (48.77)	3:13.82	Q
8	2	2	Israel	Denis Loktev (49.10); Tomer Frankel (48.01); Ron Polonsky (48.83); Gal Cohen Groumi (48.09)	3:14.03	Q, NR
9	2	0	Germany	Rafael Miroslaw (49.11); Josha Salchow (47.92); Luca Armbruster (48.82); Peter Varjasi (48.19)	3:14.04	
10	3	2	Serbia	Velimir Stjepanović (48.76); Andrej Barna (47.68); Nikola Aćin (49.01); Uroš Nikolić (48.91)	3:14.36	
11	3	3	Hungary	Nándor Németh (48.20); Szebasztián Szabó (48.43); Dániel Mészáros (48.96); Hubert Kós (48.83)	3:14.42	
12	3	8	France	Hadrien Salvan (48.70); Max Berg (48.62); Guillaume Guth (48.94); Florent Manaudou (48.28)	3:14.54	
13	3	9	Japan	Katsuhiro Matsumoto (48.54); Masahiro Kawane (49.35); Tomonobu Gomi (48.85); Katsumi Nakamura (48.10)	3:14.84	
14	2	1	Poland	Kamil Sieradzki (49.06); Kacper Stokowski (49.01); Adrian Jaskiewicz (49.62); Ksawery Masiuk (47.86)	3:15.55	
15	3	0	Greece	Andreas Vazaios (49.18); Apostolos Christou (49.30); Odyssefs Meladinis (48.99); Kristian Gkolomeev (48.39)	3:15.86	
16	2	7	Sweden	Björn Seeliger (49.07); Robin Hanson (48.77); Elias Funch Persson (49.47); Isak Eliasson (48.76)	3:16.07	
17	3	1	South Korea	Lee Ho-joon (49.21); Ji Yu-chan (48.81); Yang Jae-hoon (49.08); Kim Ji-heun (49.05)	3:16.15	
18	2	8	Singapore	Quah Zheng Wen (49.68); Jonathan Tan (48.62); Mikkel Lee (49.34); Glen Lim Jun Wei (50.25)	3:17.89	
19	1	4	Venezuela	Alberto Mestre (50.21); Emil Pérez (51.39); Jorge Otaiza (50.82); Alfonso Mestre (52.69)	3:25.11	
20	1	5	Thailand	Dulyawat Kaewsriyong (51.11); Navaphat Wongcharoen (52.12); Ratthawit Thammananthachote (52.50); Tonnam Kanteemool (51.45)	3:27.18	
21	2	9	Vietnam	Hoàng Quý Phước (51.32); Luong Jérémie Loïc Nino (50.76); Trần Hưng Nguyên (52.46); Nguyễn Quang Thuấn (53.09)	3:27.63	
	2	5	Great Britain	Lewis Burras (48.61); Matt Richards (46.89); Jacob Whittle (~~47.37~~); Duncan Scott (47.60)	DSQ	
	1	3	Mexico	DNS		

=== Final ===
The final was held at 21:43.

Rank	Lane	Nation	Swimmers	Time	Notes
1st place, gold medalist(s)	5	Australia	Jack Cartwright (47.84); Flynn Southam (47.85); Kai Taylor (47.91); Kyle Chalmers (46.56)	3:10.16	
2nd place, silver medalist(s)	3	Italy	Alessandro Miressi (47.54); Manuel Frigo (47.79); Lorenzo Zazzeri (48.13); Thomas Ceccon (47.03)	3:10.49	
3rd place, bronze medalist(s)	4	United States	Ryan Held (48.16); Jack Alexy (47.56); Chris Guiliano (47.77); Matt King (47.32)	3:10.81	
4	2	China	Pan Zhanle (47.67); Chen Juner (47.85); Wang Changhao (48.89); Wang Haoyu (46.97)	3:11.38	AS
5	6	Canada	Joshua Liendo (48.17); Ruslan Gaziev (47.30); Finlay Knox (48.70); Javier Acevedo (47.88)	3:12.05	
6	1	Brazil	Marcelo Chierighini (48.84); Guilherme Caribé (46.76); Felipe Ribeiro (48.40); Victor Alcará (48.71)	3:12.71	
7	8	Israel	Tomer Frankel (48.43); Denis Loktev (48.46); Ron Polonsky (49.07); Gal Cohen Groumi (48.57)	3:14.53	
8	7	Spain	Sergio de Celis (48.77); Luis Domínguez (48.47); Mario Mollà (48.86); César Castro (48.54)	3:14.64	
