= Paolo Conte Bonin =

Italian swimmer

Personal information
- National team: Italy
- Born: 9 February 2002 (age 24) Thiene, Italy

Sport
- Sport: Swimming
- Strokes: Freestyle
- Club: Team Veneto
Medal record
Men's swimming
Representing Italy
Olympic Games
| Event | 1st | 2nd | 3rd |
|---|---|---|---|
| Olympic Games | 0 | 0 | 1 |
| World Championships (LC) | 0 | 1 | 0 |
| World Championships (SC) | 1 | 1 | 2 |
| Total | 1 | 2 | 3 |
Olympic Games
| Bronze medal – third place | 2024 Paris | 4×100 m freestyle |
World Championships (LC)
| Silver medal – second place | 2024 Doha | 4×100 m freestyle |
World Championships (SC)
| Gold medal – first place | 2022 Melbourne | 4×100 m freestyle |
| Silver medal – second place | 2022 Melbourne | 4×50 m freestyle |
| Bronze medal – third place | 2022 Melbourne | 4×200 m freestyle |
| Bronze medal – third place | 2022 Melbourne | 4×100 m medley |
World University Games
| Silver medal – second place | 2021 Chengdu | 4×100 m mixed freestyle |
| Bronze medal – third place | 2021 Chengdu | 4×100 m freestyle |

Paolo Conte Bonin (born 9 February 2002) is an Italian swimmer.

== World records ==
=== Short course (25 m) ===
- 4 × 100 m freestyle relay: 3:02.75 (Melbourne, 13 December 2022) with Alessandro Miressi, Leonardo Deplano, Thomas Ceccon - Current holder.

== See also ==
- World record progression 4 × 100 metres freestyle relay - Men's short course
