= 2022 FINA World Swimming Championships (25 m) – Men's 4 × 100 metre freestyle relay =

Swimming competition

Men's 4 × 100 metre freestyle relay at the 2022 FINA World Swimming Championships (25 m)
- Venue: Melbourne Sports and Aquatic Centre
- Location: Melbourne, Australia
- Dates: 13 December (heats and finals)
- Competitors: 59 from 13 nations
- Teams: 13
- Winning time: 3:02.75

Medalists
gold medal	Alessandro Miressi; Paolo Conte Bonin; Leonardo Deplano; Thomas Ceccon; Manuel Frigo	Italy
silver medal	Flynn Southam; Matthew Temple; Thomas Neill; Kyle Chalmers; Shaun Champion	Australia
bronze medal	Drew Kibler; Shaine Casas; Carson Foster; Kieran Smith; David Curtiss; Trenton Julian	United States

The Men's 4 × 100 metre freestyle relay competition of the 2022 FINA World Swimming Championships (25 m) was held on 13 December 2022.

== Records ==
Prior to the competition, the existing world and championship records were as follows.

World record	United States (USA)	3:03.03	Hangzhou, China	11 December 2018
Competition record	United States (USA)	3:03.03	Hangzhou, China	11 December 2018

The following new records were set during this competition:

Date	Event	Name	Nation	Time	Record
13 December	Final	Alessandro Miressi (46.15); Paolo Conte Bonin (45.93); Leonardo Deplano (45.54); Thomas Ceccon (45.13)	Italy	3:02.75	WR

== Results ==
=== Heats ===
The heats were started at 13:26.

Rank	Heat	Lane	Nation	Swimmers	Time	Notes
1	2	4	Italy	Alessandro Miressi (46.08); Leonardo Deplano (46.19); Manuel Frigo (46.51); Paolo Conte Bonin (45.68)	3:04.46	Q
2	1	5	Brazil	Gabriel Santos (47.31); Breno Correia (45.96); Lucas Peixoto (46.76); Pedro Spajari (46.79)	3:06.82	Q
3	1	4	United States	David Curtiss (48.07); Drew Kibler (45.91); Trenton Julian (46.77); Kieran Smith (46.08)	3:06.83	Q
4	1	3	Australia	Thomas Neill (47.00); Flynn Southam (46.55); Shaun Champion (47.49); Matthew Temple (45.98)	3:07.02	Q
5	1	6	Spain	Sergio de Celis (46.71); Luis Domínguez (46.37); Mario Mollà (46.69); Carles Coll (47.98)	3:07.75	Q, NR
6	2	5	Netherlands	Stan Pijnenburg (47.24); Kenzo Simons (47.31); Caspar Corbeau (46.52); Luc Kroon (47.51)	3:08.58	Q
7	2	6	Canada	Ruslan Gaziev (47.32); Ilya Kharun (47.34); Yuri Kisil (46.57); Finlay Knox (47.57)	3:08.80	Q
8	2	2	Japan	Katsuhiro Matsumoto (47.90); Katsumi Nakamura (46.77); Masahiro Kawane (46.95); Hidenari Mano (47.63)	3:09.25	Q
9	1	7	New Zealand	Cameron Gray (47.93); Carter Swift (46.92); Zac Dell (47.59); George Williams (48.53)	3:10.97	NR
10	2	1	Bulgaria	Deniel Nankov (47.81); Josif Miladinov (48.16); Antani Ivanov (48.14); Kaloyan Bratanov (48.04)	3:12.15	NR
11	1	2	Hong Kong	Cheuk Ming Ho (48.71); Ian Ho (47.95); Ng Yan Kin (50.17); Ng Cheuk Yin (47.84)	3:14.67	NR
12	1	1	Chinese Taipei	Wang Kuan-hung (48.33) NR; Chuang Mu-lun (48.89); Cai Bing-rong (50.97); Wang Hsing-hao (49.06)	3:17.25	
13	2	7	South Africa	Simon Haddon (48.75); Clayton Jimmie (48.75); Kian Keylock (50.70); Matthew Sates (57.31)	3:25.51	
	2	3	China		Did not start	

=== Final ===
The final was held at 21:32.

Rank	Lane	Nation	Swimmers	Time	Notes
1st place, gold medalist(s)	4	Italy	Alessandro Miressi (46.15); Paolo Conte Bonin (45.93); Leonardo Deplano (45.54); Thomas Ceccon (45.13)	3:02.75	WR
2nd place, silver medalist(s)	6	Australia	Flynn Southam (47.04); Matthew Temple (46.06); Thomas Neill (46.55); Kyle Chalmers (44.98)	3:04.63	OC
3rd place, bronze medalist(s)	3	United States	Drew Kibler (46.84); Shaine Casas (45.90); Carson Foster (46.58); Kieran Smith (45.77)	3:05.09	
4	5	Brazil	Gabriel Santos (47.04); Breno Correia (46.64); Lucas Peixoto (46.54); Pedro Spajari (46.63)	3:06.85	
5	1	Canada	Ruslan Gaziev (47.08); Yuri Kisil (46.41); Javier Acevedo (46.18); Ilya Kharun (47.43)	3:07.10	NR
6	2	Spain	Sergio de Celis (46.90); Luis Domínguez (46.63); Mario Mollà (46.44 ) Carles Coll (47.22)	3:07.19	NR
7	8	Japan	Katsuhiro Matsumoto (46.72); Katsumi Nakamura (46.63); Masahiro Kawane (46.93); Hidenari Mano (47.65)	3:07.93	
8	7	Netherlands	Stan Pijnenburg (47.74); Caspar Corbeau (46.75); Nyls Korstanje (46.96); Thom de Boer (47.39)	3:08.84	
