= Pan Zhanle =

Chinese swimmer (born 2004)

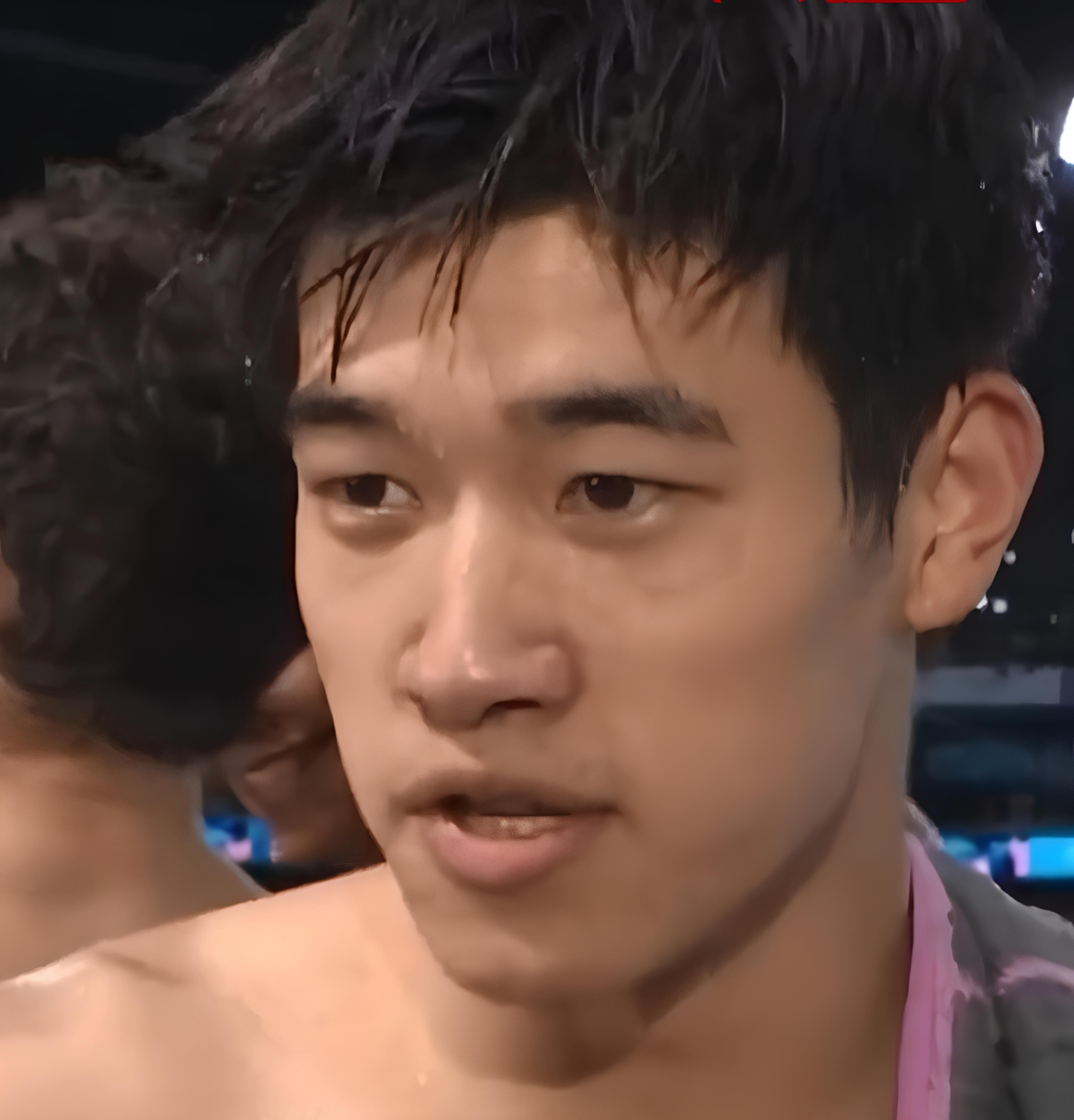
- Pan at the 2024 Summer Olympics

Personal information
- National team: China
- Born: 4 August 2004 (age 22) Wenzhou, Zhejiang, China
- Height: 1.90 m (6 ft 3 in)

Sport
- Sport: Swimming
- Strokes: Freestyle
- Club: Zhejiang Province Swim Team
- Coach: Zheng Kunliang
Medal record
Men's swimming
Representing China
Event	1st	2nd	3rd
Olympic Games	2	1	0
World Championships (LC)	4	2	0
Asian Games	7	3	1
Total	13	6	1
Olympic Games
Gold medal – first place	2024 Paris	100 m freestyle
Gold medal – first place	2024 Paris	4×100 m medley
Silver medal – second place	2024 Paris	4×100 m mixed medley
World Championships (LC)
Gold medal – first place	2024 Doha	100 m freestyle
Gold medal – first place	2024 Doha	4×100 m freestyle
Gold medal – first place	2024 Doha	4×200 m freestyle
Gold medal – first place	2024 Doha	4×100 m mixed freestyle
Silver medal – second place	2023 Fukuoka	4×100 m medley
Silver medal – second place	2025 Singapore	4×200 m freestyle
Asian Games
Gold medal – first place	2022 Hangzhou	100 m freestyle
Gold medal – first place	2022 Hangzhou	4 × 100 m freestyle relay
Gold medal – first place	2022 Hangzhou	4 × 100 m medley relay
Gold medal – first place	2026 Aichi–Nagoya	100 m freestyle
Gold medal – first place	2026 Aichi–Nagoya	4×100 m freestyle
Gold medal – first place	2026 Aichi–Nagoya	4×100 m medley
Gold medal – first place	2026 Aichi–Nagoya	4×200 m freestyle
Silver medal – second place	2022 Hangzhou	200 m freestyle
Silver medal – second place	2022 Hangzhou	400 m freestyle
Silver medal – second place	2022 Hangzhou	4 × 200 m freestyle relay
Bronze medal – third place	2022 Hangzhou	50 m freestyle

Pan Zhanle (Chinese: 潘展乐, born 4 August 2004) is a Chinese freestyle swimmer. At the 2024 Summer Olympics, he won a gold medal in the 100 metre freestyle. He is the world record holder in the long course 100 metre freestyle.

At the 2024 World Aquatics Championships, Pan broke the world record in the 100 metre freestyle as the lead-off leg in the 4 × 100 metre freestyle relay. He also won the individual 100 metre freestyle event. At the 2024 Summer Olympics, Pan won a gold medal in the 100 metre freestyle, breaking his world record. He also won a gold medal in the 4 × 100 metre medley relay, swimming the fastest split in history in the men’s 100 metre freestyle.

== Career ==
=== 2019 ===
In June 2019, at 14 years old, Pan participated in the Chinese Summer National Championships. He competed in the 1500 metre freestyle, winning with a time of 15:33.48.

=== 2021 ===
In April 2021, at 16 years old, Pan participated in the Chinese National Championships, aiming to qualify for the Summer Olympics. In the 100 m freestyle, Pan placed second with a time of 48.74 seconds, just 0.03 seconds behind He Junyi. He was within 0.2 seconds of the FINA “A” cut.

In May, Pan participated in the Chinese National Summer Championships. In the 100 m freestyle, he again took silver with a 49.02.

In September, at 17 years old, Pan competed in the National Games of China. In the 100 m freestyle, he won a bronze medal in 48.59.

In December, Pan competed in the World Swimming Championships (25m). In the 100 m freestyle, he placed 11th with a 47.09.

=== 2022 ===
In June 2022, Pan competed in the World Aquatics Championships. In the heats of the 100 m freestyle, he placed fifth with a time of 48.19. In the semifinals, he placed fifth in 47.65, tying the standing Chinese national record of 47.65, held by Ning Zetao since 2014. In the final, he claimed fourth in 47.79, just 0.08 seconds behind Josh Liendo of Canada who won bronze.

In October, Pan participated in the Chinese National Championships (25m). In the 100 m freestyle, he won with a time of 46.27.

In December, Pan competed in the World Swimming Championships (25m). In the 100 metre freestyle, he tied for sixth place in a time of 45.77, erasing the previous Asian Record of 46.14, set by Ning Zetao in 2017.

=== 2023 ===
In March 2023, Pan participated in the Chinese Spring National Championships. In the 400 m freestyle, he won the gold medal with a time of 3:47.22.

In May, Pan participated in the Chinese National Championships. In the 100 m freestyle, he posted the fastest swim of his life, taking the gold in a time of 47.22, breaking the Asian record of 47.56 that Hwang Sun-woo set in 2021. In the 50 m freestyle, he touched in 22.08 for silver. In the 200 m freestyle, he won with a time of 1:44.65. In the 400 m freestyle, he topped the event with a time of 3:46.40.

In July, Pan competed in the World Aquatics Championships. In the 4 × 100 m freestyle relay, he led off with a 47.67 to help China finish in 3:11.38, placing fourth and setting a new Asian record. In the 100 m freestyle, Pan placed fourth in 47.43, just 0.01 seconds behind Maxime Grousset of France who won bronze. In the 4 × 100 m medley relay, Pan anchored in 46.62 to help China win silver and finish in 3:29.00, breaking the Asian record.

In September, Pan competed in the Asian Games. In the 100 m freestyle, he took the gold in 46.97, establishing a new Asian Record. In the 50 m freestyle, he bagged the bronze in 21.92. In the 4 × 200 m freestyle relay, he anchored in 1:44.77, making China settle for silver in 7:03.40. In the 4 × 100 m medley relay, he anchored in 46.65 to help China win gold in 3:27.01, obliterating the Asian Record they just set at the World Championships. In the 200 m freestyle, he settled for silver in 1:45.28. In the 4 × 100 m freestyle relay, he led off in 47.06 to help China win in 3:10.88, knocking off the previous Asian record notched at the World Championships. In the 400 m freestyle, he clocked a 3:48.81 for the silver medal.

=== 2024 ===
In February 2024, Pan competed in the World Aquatics Championships. In the 4 × 100 m freestyle relay, he led off in 46.80 to help China win in 3:11.08. His swim of 46.80 broke David Popovici's world record of 46.86 which Popovici swam in 2022. In the 100 m freestyle, he took the gold in a time of 47.53. In the 4 × 200 m freestyle relay, he uploaded a 1:43.90 split on the third leg to help China win the gold medal in 7:01.84.

In April, Pan participated in the China National Swimming Championships. In the 400 m freestyle, he fired off a new lifetime best of 3:45.58 en route to gold. In the 200 m freestyle, he won gold in 1:45.68. In the 100 m freestyle, he unleashed a winning time of 46.97. In the 50 m freestyle, he got to the wall first in 22.06.

In July, Pan competed in the Summer Olympics. In the 4 x 100 m freestyle relay, he led off in 46.92, breaking the Olympic record of 47.02 that Caeleb Dressel swam in 2021. Despite that, China placed fourth in 3:11.28. In the semifinals of the 100 m freestyle, Pan touched in first in 47.21. In the final, he claimed gold in a time of 46.40, destroying his world record. His margin of victory, 1.08 seconds, was the largest in this event since the 1928 Summer Olympics, and his 0.40-second improvement on the world record was the biggest leap since 1976. In the 4 x 100 m medley relay, as the anchor leg, Pan entered the water in third place but overtook the swimmers from the United States and France in the final 100 meters, clocking a 45.92, the fastest split in history in the men’s 100 m freestyle, surpassing the previous all-time split of a 46.06 that Jason Lezak of the United States swam at the 2008 Summer Olympics wearing super suit. He brought China from third to first in a time of 3:27.46, delivering the first defeat to the United States in this event since it was included in the Olympic program at the 1960 Summer Olympics.

== Physical attributes ==
According to a Weibo post from Pan on February 29, 2024, his height is currently 189.5 cm, and his arm span is 190.5 cm.

== Personal bests ==
=== Long course (50-meter pool) ===
Event	Time	Meet	Date	Note(s)
50 m freestyle	21.92	2022 Asian Games	September 25, 2023	
100 m freestyle	46.40	2024 Paris Olympics	July 31, 2024	WR
200 m freestyle	1:44.65	2023 Chinese National Swimming Championships	May 4, 2023	
400 m freestyle	3:45.34	2025 Chinese National Swimming Championships	May 17, 2025	
800 m freestyle	7:57.92	2026 China Open Swimming Championships	March 22, 2026	
1500 m freestyle	15:28.83	2020 Chinese Spring National Swimming Championships	January 8, 2020	
50 m butterfly	23.80	2025 China National Championship	September 6, 2025	
200 m backstroke	1:58.54	2026 China National Swimming Championships	June 21, 2026	
200 m individual medley	2:01.92	2021 Chinese National Swimming Championships	January 1, 2021	
400 m individual medley	4:29.54	2019 Chinese National Youth Games	August 16, 2019	

=== Short course (25-meter pool) ===
As of November 4, 2024

Event	Time	Meet	Date	Note(s)
50 m freestyle	21.54	2022 Chinese National Championships	October 27, 2022	
100 m freestyle	45.77	2022 World Championships	December 15, 2022	AS
200 m freestyle	1:41.59	2024 World Cup	November 2, 2024	NR
400 m freestyle	3:36.43	2024 World Cup	October 24, 2024	
800 m freestyle	7:35.30	2024 World Cup	October 26, 2024	WC, NR
100 m individual medley	51.78	2024 World Cup	October 18, 2024	

Key: WR = World Record; AS = Asian Record; NR = National Record; WC = World Cup record

== Records ==
=== Long course (50 m) ===
No.	Event	Time		Meet	Location	Date	Age	Type	Status	Ref
1	100 m freestyle	47.22		2023 Chinese Championships	Hangzhou, China	1 May 2023	18	AS (not ratified)	Former	
2	4 × 100 m freestyle relay	3:11.38 (47.67, 1st leg)		2023 World Aquatics Championships	Fukuoka, Japan	23 July 2023	18	AS	Former	
3	4 × 100 m medley relay	3.29.00 (46.62, 4th leg)		2023 World Aquatics Championships	Fukuoka, Japan	30 July 2023	18	AS	Former	
4	100 m freestyle	46.97		2022 Asian Games	Hangzhou, China	24 September 2023	19	AS	Former	
5	4 × 200 m freestyle relay	7:03.40 (1:44.77, 4th leg)		2022 Asian Games	Hangzhou, China	25 September 2023	19	NR	Former	
6	4 × 100 m medley relay	3:27.01 (46.65, 4th leg)		2022 Asian Games	Hangzhou, China	26 September 2023	19	AS	Current	
7	4 × 100 m freestyle relay	3:10.88 (47.06, 1st leg)		2022 Asian Games	Hangzhou, China	28 September 2023	19	AS	Current	
8	100 m freestyle (1st leg)	46.80	r	2024 World Aquatics Championships	Doha, Qatar	11 February 2024	19	WR, AS	Former	
9	4 × 200 m freestyle relay	7:01.84 (1:43:90, 3rd leg)		2024 World Aquatics Championships	Doha, Qatar	16 February 2024	19	NR	Former	
10	4 × 100 m mixed freestyle	3:21.18 (47.29, 1st leg)		2024 World Aquatics Championships	Doha, Qatar	17 February 2024	19	AS	Current	
11	100 m freestyle (1st leg)	46.92	r	2024 Summer Olympics	Paris, France	27 July 2024	19	OR	Former	
12	100 m freestyle	46.40		2024 Olympic Games	Paris, France	31 July 2024	19	WR, OR, AS	Current	
13	4 x 200 m freestyle relay	7:00.91(1:44.41, 2nd leg)		2025 World Aquatics Championships	Singapore, Singapore	1 August 2025	20	AS, NR	Current	

=== Short course (25 m) ===
No.	Event	Time	Meet	Location	Date	Age	Type	Status	Ref
1	100 m freestyle	45.77	2022 World Swimming Championships	Melbourne, Australia	15 December 2022	18	AS	Current	
2	200 m freestyle	1:41.59	2024 Swimming World Cup	Singapore	2 November 2024	20	NR	Current	
3	800 m freestyle	7:35.30	2024 Swimming World Cup	Incheon, South Korea	26 October 2024	20	NR	Current	

Key: NR = National Record; AS = Asian Record; WJ = World Junior Record; WR = World Record; OR = Olympic Record; h = heats; sf = semifinal; r = Relay

Records
Preceded by (Romania) David Popovici	Men's 100-metre freestyle world record-holder (long course); 11 February 2024 – present	Succeeded by Incumbent
Preceded by (China) Ning Zetao	Men's 100-metre freestyle Asian record-holder (long course); 27 July 2023 – present	Succeeded by Incumbent
