= Jack Cartwright =

Australian swimmer (born 1998)

Personal information
- Nationality: Australian
- Born: 22 September 1998 (age 28) Auchenflower, Queensland, Australia
- Height: 1.91 m (6 ft 3 in)
- Weight: 81 kg (179 lb)

Sport
- Sport: Swimming
- Strokes: Freestyle
- Coach: Dean Boxall
Medal record
Men's swimming
Representing Australia
Olympic Games
Silver medal – second place	2024 Paris	4×100 m freestyle
World Championships (LC)
Gold medal – first place	2022 Budapest	4×100 m mixed freestyle
Gold medal – first place	2023 Fukuoka	4×100 m freestyle
Gold medal – first place	2023 Fukuoka	4×100 m mixed freestyle
Silver medal – second place	2022 Budapest	4×100 m freestyle
Silver medal – second place	2024 Doha	4×100 m mixed freestyle
Pan Pacific Championships
Silver medal – second place	2018 Tokyo	100 m freestyle
Silver medal – second place	2018 Tokyo	4×100 m freestyle
Silver medal – second place	2018 Tokyo	4×200 m freestyle
Commonwealth Games
Gold medal – first place	2018 Gold Coast	4×100 m freestyle
World Junior Championships
Gold medal – first place	2015 Singapore	4×100 m freestyle
Silver medal – second place	2015 Singapore	4×100 m freestyle mixed
Junior Pan Pac Championships
Gold medal – first place	2016 Maui	50 m freestyle
Gold medal – first place	2016 Maui	100 m freestyle
Gold medal – first place	2016 Maui	200 m freestyle
Gold medal – first place	2016 Maui	4×200 m freestyle
Silver medal – second place	2016 Maui	4×100 m freestyle
Bronze medal – third place	2016 Maui	4×100 m medley

Jack Cartwright (born 22 September 1998) is an Australian swimmer.

He is scheduled to make his Olympics debut at the 2024 Summer Olympics in Paris on 27 July 2024.

== Early life and career ==
Cartwright was raised in Biloela, Queensland where during his childhood he would travel to Gladstone for training, moving to the city in 2008 where he trained with the Gladstone Gladiators.

After securing a scholarship, Cartwright relocated to Brisbane in 2014 to attend private Lutheran school St Peters College.

At the 2016 Junior Pan Pacific Swimming Championships, Cartwright won gold medals in the 200 metre freestyle, 100 metre freestyle (where he set a Championships record of 48.91 seconds in the preliminaries), 50 metre freestyle, and the 4×200 metre freestyle relay, a silver medal in 4×100 metre freestyle relay, and a bronze medal in the 4×100 metre medley relay.

He competed in the men's 100 metre freestyle event at the 2017 World Aquatics Championships.

At the 2018 Commonwealth Games on the Gold Coast, Cartwright won two gold medals as part of the teams who won the 4x100m freestyle relay and the 4x100m medley relay.

Cartwright was part of the winning 4 x 100 metre relay and the 4 x 100 metre freestyle teams at the 2022 and 2023 World Aquatics Championships in Budapest and Fukushima respectively, winning a collective total of three gold medals and one silver medal. Following this success, Cartwright won another silver medal at the 2024 World Aquatics Championships in Doha as part of the mixed 4 x 100 metre freestyle relay team.

Following the 2024 Australian Swimming Trials in Brisbane, Cartwright was named as part of the Australian swimming team to compete in the 2024 Summer Olympics in Paris.

== World records ==
=== Long course metres ===
No.	Event	Time	Meet	Location	Date	Status	Ref
1	4x100 m mixed freestyle relay^{[a]}	3:19.38	2022 World Aquatics Championships	Budapest, Hungary	24 June 2022	Former	
2	4x100 m mixed freestyle relay^{[b]}	3:18.83	2023 World Aquatics Championships	Fukuoka, Japan	29 July 2023	Former	

Legend: OC – Oceanian record; NR – Australian record; e – equalled existing record;
Records not set in finals: h – heat; sf – semifinal; r – relay 1st leg; rh – relay heat 1st leg; b – B final; † – en route to final mark; so – swim-off; tt – time trial

^{a} split 48.12 (1st leg); with Kyle Chalmers (2nd leg), Madison Wilson (3rd leg), Mollie O'Callaghan (4th leg)
^{b} split 48.14 (1st leg); with Kyle Chalmers (2nd leg), Shayna Jack (3rd leg), Mollie O'Callaghan (4th leg)
