= Swimming at the 2022 Asian Games – Men's 100 metre freestyle =

Men's 100 metre freestyle at the 2022 Asian Games
- Venue: Hangzhou Olympic Expo Aquatics Center
- Date: 24 September 2023
- Competitors: 44 from 29 nations

Medalists
gold medal	Pan Zhanle	China
silver medal	Wang Haoyu	China
bronze medal	Hwang Sun-woo	South Korea

The men's 100 metre freestyle event at the 2022 Asian Games took place on 24 September 2023 at the Hangzhou Olympic Expo Center.

== Schedule ==
All times are China Standard Time (UTC+08:00)

Date	Time	Event
Sunday, 24 September 2023	10:49	Heats
Sunday, 24 September 2023	20:26	Final

== Records ==
Prior to this competition, the existing world, Asian and Games records were as follows.

World Record	David Popovici (ROU)	46.86	Rome, Italy	13 August 2022
Asian Record	Pan Zhanle (CHN)	47.43	Fukuoka, Japan	25 July 2023
Games Record	Ning Zetao (CHN)	47.70	Incheon, South Korea	25 September 2014

== Results ==
=== Heats ===
Rank	Heat	Athlete	Time	Notes
1	4	Wang Haoyu (CHN)	48.13	
2	6	Hwang Sun-woo (KOR)	48.54	
3	6	Pan Zhanle (CHN)	48.66	
3	5	Katsuhiro Matsumoto (JPN)	48.66	
5	4	Jonathan Tan (SGP)	49.12	
6	5	Adilbek Mussin (KAZ)	49.18	
7	6	Lee Ho-joon (KOR)	49.24	
8	5	Quah Zheng Wen (SGP)	49.28	
9	5	Tomonobu Gomi (JPN)	49.50	
10	4	Cheuk Ming Ho (HKG)	50.03	
11	4	Dulyawat Kaewsriyong (THA)	50.26	
12	4	Tanish George Mathew (IND)	50.61	
13	4	Lim Yin Chuen (MAS)	50.82	
14	6	Ian Ho (HKG)	50.90	
14	5	Jarod Hatch (PHI)	50.90	
16	5	Samyar Abdoli (IRI)	50.92	
17	6	Anand A. S. (IND)	50.94	
18	6	Waleed Abdulrazzaq (KUW)	50.98	
18	5	Arvin Shaun Singh Chahal (MAS)	50.98	
20	4	Joe Kurniawan (INA)	51.04	
21	6	Matthew Abeysinghe (SRI)	51.18	
22	5	Ngô Đình Chuyền (VIE)	51.42	
23	3	Musa Jalaýew (TKM)	51.63	
24	3	Karel Subagyo (INA)	52.11	
25	2	Yazan Al-Bawwab (PLE)	52.25	
26	3	Batbayaryn Enkhtamir (MGL)	52.55	
27	3	Ahmed Diab (QAT)	52.93	
28	1	Mahmoud Abugharbia (PLE)	53.20	
29	3	Tameem El-Hamayda (QAT)	53.37	
30	4	Issa Al-Adawi (OMA)	53.53	
31	3	Ng Chi Hin (MAC)	53.89	
32	3	Antoine de Lapparent (CAM)	53.93	
33	2	Muhammad Ahmed Durrani (PAK)	53.96	
34	3	Alexander Shah (NEP)	54.14	
35	6	Tonnam Kanteemool (THA)	54.87	
36	2	Muhammad Amaan Siddiqui (PAK)	55.03	
37	2	Ardasher Gadoev (TJK)	55.11	
38	2	Montross Phansovannarun (CAM)	55.35	
39	2	Sangay Tenzin (BHU)	55.94	
40	2	Rentsendorjiin Tamir (MGL)	56.11	
41	2	Mubal Azzam Ibrahim (MDV)	58.44	
42	1	Santisouk Inthavong (LAO)	58.48	
43	1	Nikita Borisov (TJK)	1:04.94	
44	1	Jolanio Guterres (TLS)	1:08.14	

=== Final ===
Rank	Athlete	Time	Notes
1st place, gold medalist(s)	Pan Zhanle (CHN)	46.97	AR
2nd place, silver medalist(s)	Wang Haoyu (CHN)	48.02	
3rd place, bronze medalist(s)	Hwang Sun-woo (KOR)	48.04	
4	Lee Ho-joon (KOR)	48.68	
5	Katsuhiro Matsumoto (JPN)	48.72	
6	Jonathan Tan (SGP)	48.94	
7	Adilbek Mussin (KAZ)	49.10	
8	Quah Zheng Wen (SGP)	49.27	
