= 2018 Pan Pacific Swimming Championships – Men's 4 × 200 metre freestyle relay =

Men's 2018 Pan Pacific Swimming Championship

Men's 4 × 200 metre freestyle relay at the 2018 Pan Pacific Swimming Championships
- Venue: Tokyo Tatsumi International Swimming Center
- Dates: 10 August
- Competitors: 20 from 5 nations
- Winning time: 7:04.36

Medalists
gold medal	Andrew Seliskar; Blake Pieroni; Zachary Apple; Townley Haas	United States
silver medal	Clyde Lewis; Kyle Chalmers; Alexander Graham; Jack Cartwright	Australia
bronze medal	Naito Ehara; Reo Sakata; Yuki Kobori; Katsuhiro Matsumoto	Japan

The men's 4 × 200 metre freestyle relay competition at the 2018 Pan Pacific Swimming Championships took place on August 10 at the Tokyo Tatsumi International Swimming Center. The defending champion was the United States.

== Records ==
Prior to this competition, the existing world and Pan Pacific records were as follows:

World record	United States (USA); Michael Phelps (1:44.49); Ricky Berens (1:44.13); David Walters (1:45.47); Ryan Lochte (1:44.46)	6:58.55	Rome, Italy	31 July 2009
Pan Pacific Championships record	United States (USA); Michael Phelps (1:45.62); Peter Vanderkaay (1:46.46); Ricky Berens (1:46.49); Ryan Lochte (1:45.27)	7:03.84	Irvine, United States	19 August 2010

== Results ==
All times are in minutes and seconds.

KEY:	CR	Championships record	NR	National record	PB	Personal best	SB	Seasonal best

=== Final ===
The final was held on 10 August from 18:00.

Rank	Lane	Nation	Swimmers	Time	Notes
1st place, gold medalist(s)	5	United States	Andrew Seliskar (1:46.75); Blake Pieroni (1:47.63); Zachary Apple (1:46.20); Townley Haas (1:43.78)	7:04.36	
2nd place, silver medalist(s)	3	Australia	Clyde Lewis (1:46.54); Kyle Chalmers (1:46.73); Alexander Graham (1:45.91); Jack Cartwright (1:45.52)	7:04.70	
3rd place, bronze medalist(s)	4	Japan	Naito Ehara (1:47.28); Reo Sakata (1:47.07); Yuki Kobori (1:48.41); Katsuhiro Matsumoto (1:45.31)	7:08.07	
4	6	Brazil	Luiz Altamir Melo (1:47.65); Fernando Scheffer (1:44.87); Leonardo de Deus (1:49.34); Guilherme Costa (1:49.79)	7:11.65	
5	2	Canada	Alex Pratt (1:48.32); Ruslan Gaziev (1:49.50); Markus Thormeyer (1:50.56); Javier Acevedo (1:49.87)	7:18.25	
