= Alessandro Miressi =

Italian swimmer (born 1998)

Personal information
- National team: Italy
- Born: 2 October 1998 (age 28) Turin, Italy
- Height: 2.02 m (6 ft 8 in)
- Weight: 99 kg (218 lb)

Sport
- Sport: Swimming
- Strokes: Freestyle
- Club: Fiamme Oro
- Coach: Antonio Satta
Medal record
Men's swimming
Representing Italy
Senior level
Event	1st	2nd	3rd
Olympic Games	0	1	2
World Championships (LC)	1	3	2
World Championships (SC)	6	3	4
European Championships (LC)	3	2	6
European Championships (SC)	0	9	1
European Games	0	2	0
Universiade	0	1	0
Mediterranean Games	0	1	0
Total	10	22	15
Olympic Games
Silver medal – second place	2020 Tokyo	4×100 m freestyle
Bronze medal – third place	2020 Tokyo	4×100 m medley
Bronze medal – third place	2024 Paris	4×100 m freestyle
World Championships (LC)
Gold medal – first place	2022 Budapest	4×100 m medley
Silver medal – second place	2023 Fukuoka	4×100 m freestyle
Silver medal – second place	2024 Doha	100 m freestyle
Silver medal – second place	2024 Doha	4×100 m freestyle
Bronze medal – third place	2022 Budapest	4×100 m freestyle
Bronze medal – third place	2024 Doha	4×100 m medley
World Championships (SC)
Gold medal – first place	2021 Abu Dhabi	100 m freestyle
Gold medal – first place	2021 Abu Dhabi	4×50 m freestyle
Gold medal – first place	2021 Abu Dhabi	4×100 m medley
Gold medal – first place	2022 Melbourne	4×100 m freestyle
Gold medal – first place	2022 Melbourne	4×50 m medley
Gold medal – first place	2024 Budapest	4×50 m mixed freestyle
Silver medal – second place	2021 Abu Dhabi	4×100 m freestyle
Silver medal – second place	2022 Melbourne	4×50 m freestyle
Silver medal – second place	2024 Budapest	4×100 m freestyle
Bronze medal – third place	2018 Hangzhou	4×50 m freestyle
Bronze medal – third place	2022 Melbourne	100 m freestyle
Bronze medal – third place	2022 Melbourne	4×100 m medley
Bronze medal – third place	2024 Budapest	4×100 m medley
European Championships (LC)
Gold medal – first place	2018 Glasgow	100 m freestyle
Gold medal – first place	2022 Rome	4×100 m freestyle
Gold medal – first place	2022 Rome	4×100 m medley
Silver medal – second place	2018 Glasgow	4×100 m freestyle
Silver medal – second place	2020 Budapest	100 m freestyle
Bronze medal – third place	2018 Glasgow	4×100 m mixed medley
Bronze medal – third place	2020 Budapest	4×100 m freestyle
Bronze medal – third place	2020 Budapest	4×100 m mixed medley
Bronze medal – third place	2020 Budapest	4×100 m mixed freestyle
Bronze medal – third place	2020 Budapest	4×100 m medley
Bronze medal – third place	2022 Rome	100 m freestyle
European Championships (SC)
Silver medal – second place	2017 Copenhagen	4×50 m freestyle
Silver medal – second place	2017 Copenhagen	4×50 m medley
Silver medal – second place	2019 Glasgow	100 m freestyle
Silver medal – second place	2021 Kazan	100 m freestyle
Silver medal – second place	2021 Kazan	4x50 m freestyle
Silver medal – second place	2021 Kazan	4x50 m mixed freestyle
Silver medal – second place	2023 Otopeni	100 m freestyle
Silver medal – second place	2023 Otopeni	4x50 m freestyle
Silver medal – second place	2023 Otopeni	4x50 m mixed freestyle
Bronze medal – third place	2019 Glasgow	4×50 m freestyle
European Games
Silver medal – second place	2015 Baku	100 m freestyle
Silver medal – second place	2015 Baku	4×100 m freestyle
Universiade
Silver medal – second place	2017 Taipei	4×100 m freestyle
Mediterranean Games
Silver medal – second place	2018 Tarragona	100 m freestyle
Junior level
Event	1st	2nd	3rd
World Junior Championships	0	0	1
European Junior Championships	3	1	1
Total	3	1	2
World Junior Championships
Bronze medal – third place	2015 Singapore	4×100 m freestyle
European Junior Championships
Gold medal – first place	2016 Hódmezővásárhely	100 m freestyle
Gold medal – first place	2016 Hódmezővásárhely	4×100 m medley
Gold medal – first place	2016 Hódmezővásárhely	4×100 m mixed medley
Silver medal – second place	2016 Hódmezővásárhely	4×100 m freestyle
Bronze medal – third place	2016 Hódmezővásárhely	4×100 m mixed freestyle

Alessandro Miressi (born 2 October 1998) is an Italian swimmer. He is a world record holder in the short course 4×100 metre freestyle relay and an Italian record holder in the long course and short course 100 metre freestyle. In the long course 100 metre freestyle, he was 2018 European champion, 2020 European Championships silver medalist, and 2022 European Championships bronze medalist. In the short course 100 metre freestyle, he was 2021 World champion, 2019 and 2021 European Championships silver medalist, and 2022 World Championships bronze medalist.

== Career ==
In 2018, Miressi competed in the men's 4 × 100 metre freestyle relay event at the European Championships, winning the silver medal. He then won a gold in the 100 metre freestyle, followed by a bronze in the mixed 4 × 100 metre medley relay. He is the holder of the Italian record in the 100 m freestyle, with 47.45 (2021). He competed at the 2020 Summer Olympics, in Men's 4 × 100 metre freestyle relay, winning a silver medal, the Men's 4 × 100 metre medley relay, winning a bronze medal, and the 100 metre freestyle, where he placed sixth.

=== 2021 World Short Course Championships ===
Day one of the 2021 World Short Course Championships, contested in December in Abu Dhabi, United Arab Emirates, Miressi led-off the 4×100 metre freestyle relay with a 46.12 in the final, contributing to a new Italian record time of 3:03.61 and a silver medal-win. The second day, he helped achieve a fifth-place finish in the 4×50 metre mixed freestyle relay, splitting a 21.18 for the second leg of the relay to contribute to the final time of 1:30.02. Anchoring the 4×50 metre freestyle relay in the final to a finish in 1:23.61 with a split time of 20.61, he helped finish 0.14 seconds ahead of the second-fastest relay team and win the gold medal in the event on day four. On the sixth and final evening, he won his first gold medal of the session in the 100 metre freestyle, winning the event with an Italian record time of 45.57, which broke the Italian record of 45.58 seconds he set in the semifinals of the event the day before. He won his second and final gold medal of the session in the 4×100 metre medley relay, anchoring the finals relay to a Championships record and Italian record time of 3:19.76 in 45.05 seconds.

=== 2022 World Championships ===
At the 2022 World Aquatics Championships, with swimming competition held in June at Danube Arena in Budapest, Hungary, Miressi won a bronze medal as part of the 4×100 metre freestyle relay in a time of 3:10.95. Swimming a time of 47.48 seconds for the freestyle leg of the 4×100 metre medley relay in the final, he helped tie the European record and set a new Italian record with a finals relay time of 3:27.51 to win the gold medal.

=== 2022 European Championships ===
On the second day of the 2022 European Aquatics Championships, held in Rome in August, Miressi ranked second in the preliminaries of the 100 metre freestyle, advancing to the semifinals with a time of 47.60 seconds. For the semifinals, he swam a 47.96 and qualified for the final ranking third behind David Popovici of Romania and Kristóf Milák of Hungary. Finishing third in the final behind the same duo as in the semifinals, Miressi won the bronze medal with a time of 47.63 seconds. The following day, day four, he led-off the 4×100 metre freestyle relay in the final with a 47.76, contributing to a gold medal-winning time of 3:10.50. Day five, he split a 47.38 for the second leg of the 4×100 metre mixed freestyle relay in the final to help place fourth with a time of 3:23.62, which was 0.22 seconds behind the bronze medal-winning team from Sweden.

In the preliminaries of the 50 metre freestyle on day six, Miressi was the third-fastest Italian with a time of 22.26 seconds, ranked eighteenth, and did not advance to the semifinals. The following day, he swam the 100 metre freestyle portion of the 4×100 metre medley relay in 47.17 seconds in the final, helping win the gold medal with a new Championships record time of 3:28.46.

=== 2022 Swimming World Cup ===
At the stop of the 2022 FINA Swimming World Cup circuit held in Berlin, Germany, Miressi competed in the 50 metre freestyle, placing twenty-fourth with a time of 21.94 seconds, and the 100 metre freestyle, where he placed fifth in the final with a time of 47.00 seconds, which was 1.12 seconds slower than gold medalist Kyle Chalmers of Australia.

=== 2022 World Short Course Championships ===
Day one in Melbourne, Australia for the 2022 World Short Course Championships in December, Miressi led-off the 4×100 metre freestyle relay in the preliminaries with a time of 46.08 seconds to contribute to a first-ranked time of 3:04.46 heading into the final. Later in the day, he helped set a new word record in the event with a 3:02.75 to win the gold medal, contributing a lead-off time of 46.15 seconds to the final mark. In the morning of day three, he swam the first 50 metre portion of the 4×50 metre freestyle relay in 21.26 seconds, helping achieve a third-rank time of 1:24.13 and qualify for the final. For the final of the 100 metre freestyle in the evening session, he won the bronze medal with a personal best time of 45.57 seconds that tied his Italian record in the event. Later in the session, he swam the lead-off leg of the 4×50 metre freestyle relay in 21.22 to contribute to the silver medal-winning time of 1:23.48.

For the preliminaries of the 50 metre freestyle on the fourth morning, Miressi achieved a personal best time of 21.17 seconds, qualifying for the semifinals tied in rank for twelfth overall. In the evening semifinals, he lowered his personal best time to a 21.13, ranked thirteenth, and did not qualify for the final. The following day, in the morning preliminaries, he contributed 20.84 seconds to the time of 1:32.31 for the 4×50 metre medley relay on the freestyle leg of the relay, helping advance the relay to the final ranked first. In the evening, he was substituted out and Leonardo Deplano substituted in on the finals relay, and when the finals relay placed first in a time of 1:29.72 he and the other prelims and finals relay members won the gold medal for their efforts. On the final day, he anchored the 4×100 metre medley relay in the final with a time of 45.56 seconds to help set a new European record with a time of 3:19.06.

=== 2023 ===
At the 2023 Italian National Spring Championships in April in Riccione, Miressi won the silver medal in the 50 metre freestyle on day one with a time of 22.12 seconds. In the final of the 100 metre freestyle on the third evening, he won the gold medal with a time of 48.61 seconds. Later in the evening, he won a gold medal in the 4×100 metre medley relay, splitting a 48.37 for the freestyle leg to help win in a final time of 3:34.68 with GS Fiamme Oro relay teammate Simone Stefani (backstroke), Simone Cerasuolo (breaststroke), and Thomas Ceccon (butterfly). On the fifth and final day, his lead-off leg of the 4×100 metre freestyle relay, a time of 48.37 seconds, contributed to a gold medal-win in an Italian club record time of 3:14.60 with GS Fiamme Oro relay teammates Manuel Frigo, Marco Orsi, and Thomas Ceccon.

== Personal life ==
Miressi is a cousin of canoeists Cristina and Maria Clara Giai Pron. He graduated in Exercise Science from the University of Turin.

== International championships (50 m) ==
Meet	50 freestyle	100 freestyle	200 freestyle	4×100 freestyle	4×200 freestyle	4×100 medley	4×100 mixed freestyle	4×100 mixed medley
Junior level
EG 2015		2nd place, silver medalist(s)	41st	2nd place, silver medalist(s)	5th	4th	4th	4th
WJC 2015		5th	20th	3rd place, bronze medalist(s)	10th		6th	
EJC 2016	15th	1st place, gold medalist(s)	44th	2nd place, silver medalist(s)	6th	1st place, gold medalist(s)	3rd place, bronze medalist(s)	1st place, gold medalist(s)
Senior level
WC 2017				DSQ		11th	5th	
WUG 2017		11th		2nd place, silver medalist(s)		4th		
MG 2018		2nd place, silver medalist(s)		7th		7th		
EC 2018	12th	1st place, gold medalist(s)		2nd place, silver medalist(s)			4th	3rd place, bronze medalist(s)
WC 2019		9th		4th			8th	
EC 2020	8th	2nd place, silver medalist(s)		3rd place, bronze medalist(s)		3rd place, bronze medalist(s)	3rd place, bronze medalist(s)	3rd place, bronze medalist(s)
OG 2020		6th		2nd place, silver medalist(s)		3rd place, bronze medalist(s)	—N/a	
WC 2022		8th		3rd place, bronze medalist(s)		1st place, gold medalist(s)	7th	
EC 2022	18th	3rd place, bronze medalist(s)		1st place, gold medalist(s)		1st place, gold medalist(s)	4th	
WC 2023		13th		2nd place, silver medalist(s)			5th	
WC 2024		2nd place, silver medalist(s)		2nd place, silver medalist(s)		3rd place, bronze medalist(s)	5th	

== International championships (25 m) ==
Meet	50 freestyle	100 freestyle	200 freestyle	4×50 freestyle	4×100 freestyle	4×50 medley	4×100 medley	4×50 mixed freestyle
EC 2017		10th (h)	9th	2nd place, silver medalist(s)	—N/a	5th^{[a]}	—N/a	
WC 2018		10th		3rd place, bronze medalist(s)	4th			9th
EC 2019	6th	2nd place, silver medalist(s)		3rd place, bronze medalist(s)	—N/a	4th	—N/a	5th
EC 2021	14th (h)	2nd place, silver medalist(s)		2nd place, silver medalist(s)	—N/a		—N/a	2nd place, silver medalist(s)
WC 2021		1st place, gold medalist(s)		1st place, gold medalist(s)	2nd place, silver medalist(s)		1st place, gold medalist(s)	5th
WC 2022	13th	3rd place, bronze medalist(s)		2nd place, silver medalist(s)	1st place, gold medalist(s)	(gold) ^{[a]}	3rd place, bronze medalist(s)	
EC 2023	4th	2nd place, silver medalist(s)		2nd place, silver medalist(s)	—N/a		—N/a	2nd place, silver medalist(s)

^{a} Miressi swam only in the preliminaries.

== Personal best times ==
=== Long course metres (50 m pool) ===
Event	Time		Meet	Location	Date	Notes	Ref
50 m freestyle	21.86	sf	2020 European Aquatics Championships	Budapest, Hungary	22 May 2021		
100 m freestyle	47.45		2020 European Aquatics Championships	Budapest, Hungary	19 May 2021	NR	

Legend: NR – Italian record; e – equalled existing record;
Records not set in finals: h – heat; sf – semifinal; r – relay 1st leg; rh – relay heat 1st leg; b – B final; † – en route to final mark; so – swim-off; tt – time trial

=== Short course metres (25 m pool) ===
Event	Time		Meet	Location	Date	Notes	Ref
50 m freestyle	20.87	sf	European Short Course Championships 2023	Otopeni, Romania	9 December 2023		
100 m freestyle	45.51		European Short Course Championships 2023	Otopeni, Romania	10 December 2023	NR	

Legend: NR – Italian record; e – equalled existing record;
Records not set in finals: h – heat; sf – semifinal; r – relay 1st leg; rh – relay heat 1st leg; b – B final; † – en route to final mark; so – swim-off; tt – time trial

== World records ==
=== Short course metres (25 m pool) ===
No.	Event	Time	Meet	Location	Date	Status	Ref
1	4×100 m freestyle	3:02.75	2022 World Short Course Championships	Melbourne, Australia	13 December 2022	Current	
