= Kyle Chalmers =

Australian swimmer (born 1998)

Personal information
- Nicknames: The Big Tuna, 'Ray' Chalmers, King Kyle, Super Nintendo Chalmers
- National team: Australia
- Born: 25 June 1998 (age 28) Ashford, South Australia, Australia
- Height: 1.94 m (6 ft 4 in)
- Weight: 93 kg (205 lb)

Sport
- Sport: Swimming
- Strokes: Butterfly, freestyle
- Club: Marion Swimming Club
- Coach: Peter 'Bish' Bishop
Medal record
Event	1st	2nd	3rd
Olympic Games	1	3	5
World Championships (LC)	6	4	4
World Championships (SC)	3	3	1
Oceania Championships	4	1	0
Pan Pacific Championships	1	2	1
Commonwealth Games	10	2	1
Total	25	15	12
Men's swimming
Representing Australia
Olympic Games
Gold medal – first place	2016 Rio de Janeiro	100 m freestyle
Silver medal – second place	2020 Tokyo	100 m freestyle
Silver medal – second place	2024 Paris	100 m freestyle
Silver medal – second place	2024 Paris	4×100 m freestyle
Bronze medal – third place	2016 Rio de Janeiro	4×100 m freestyle
Bronze medal – third place	2016 Rio de Janeiro	4×100 m medley
Bronze medal – third place	2020 Tokyo	4×100 m freestyle
Bronze medal – third place	2020 Tokyo	4×200 m freestyle
Bronze medal – third place	2024 Paris	4×100 m mixed medley
World Championships (LC)
Gold medal – first place	2019 Gwangju	4×200 m freestyle
Gold medal – first place	2022 Budapest	4×100 m mixed freestyle
Gold medal – first place	2023 Fukuoka	100 m freestyle
Gold medal – first place	2023 Fukuoka	4×100 m freestyle
Gold medal – first place	2023 Fukuoka	4×100 m mixed freestyle
Gold medal – first place	2025 Singapore	4×100 m freestyle
Silver medal – second place	2015 Kazan	4×100 m medley
Silver medal – second place	2019 Gwangju	100 m freestyle
Silver medal – second place	2019 Gwangju	4×100 m mixed freestyle
Silver medal – second place	2022 Budapest	4×100 m freestyle
Bronze medal – third place	2019 Gwangju	4×100 m freestyle
Bronze medal – third place	2023 Fukuoka	4×200 m freestyle
Bronze medal – third place	2023 Fukuoka	4×100 m medley
Bronze medal – third place	2025 Singapore	100 m freestyle
World Championships (SC)
Gold medal – first place	2022 Melbourne	100 m freestyle
Gold medal – first place	2022 Melbourne	4×50 m freestyle
Gold medal – first place	2022 Melbourne	4×100 m medley
Silver medal – second place	2022 Melbourne	4×100 m freestyle
Silver medal – second place	2022 Melbourne	4×200 m freestyle
Silver medal – second place	2022 Melbourne	4×50 m mixed freestyle
Bronze medal – third place	2022 Melbourne	4×50 m medley
Oceania Championships
Gold medal – first place	2014 Auckland	100 m freestyle
Gold medal – first place	2014 Auckland	50 m butterfly
Gold medal – first place	2014 Auckland	4×50 m mixed freestyle
Gold medal – first place	2014 Auckland	4×100 m mixed freestyle
Silver medal – second place	2014 Auckland	4×100 m freestyle
Pan Pacific Championships
Gold medal – first place	2018 Tokyo	100 m freestyle
Silver medal – second place	2018 Tokyo	4×100 m freestyle
Silver medal – second place	2018 Tokyo	4×200 m freestyle
Bronze medal – third place	2018 Tokyo	4×100 m medley
Commonwealth Games
Gold medal – first place	2018 Gold Coast	200 m freestyle
Gold medal – first place	2018 Gold Coast	4×100 m freestyle
Gold medal – first place	2018 Gold Coast	4×200 m freestyle
Gold medal – first place	2018 Gold Coast	4×100 m medley
Gold medal – first place	2022 Birmingham	4×100 m mixed freestyle
Gold medal – first place	2022 Birmingham	4×100 m freestyle
Gold medal – first place	2022 Birmingham	100 m freestyle
Gold medal – first place	2026 Glasgow	50 m butterfly
Gold medal – first place	2026 Glasgow	4×100 m freestyle
Gold medal – first place	2026 Glasgow	4×100 m mixed freestyle
Silver medal – second place	2018 Gold Coast	100 m freestyle
Silver medal – second place	2022 Birmingham	4×100 m medley
Bronze medal – third place	2026 Glasgow	100 m freestyle
World Junior Championships
Gold medal – first place	2015 Singapore	50 m freestyle
Gold medal – first place	2015 Singapore	100 m freestyle
Gold medal – first place	2015 Singapore	4×100 m freestyle
Silver medal – second place	2015 Singapore	4×200 m freestyle
Silver medal – second place	2015 Singapore	4×100 m mixed freestyle
Silver medal – second place	2015 Singapore	4×100 m mixed medley
Bronze medal – third place	2015 Singapore	4×100 m medley
Summer Youth Olympics
Bronze medal – third place	2014 Nanjing	4×100 m medley
Bronze medal – third place	2014 Nanjing	4×100 m mixed freestyle
Bronze medal – third place	2014 Nanjing	4×100 m mixed medley

Kyle Chalmers, OAM (born 25 June 1998) is an Australian competitive swimmer. He held the world record in the short course 100 metre freestyle from 2021 to 2026. He currently holds world records in the 4×100 metre medley relay, and long course 4×100 metre mixed freestyle relay. He is the Oceanian and Australian record holder in the short course 50 metre butterfly and 50 metre freestyle.

At the 2014 Oceania Swimming Championships, Chalmers won the Oceania title in the 50 metre butterfly and 100 metre freestyle. He was the 2016 Olympic champion in Rio de Janeiro in the 100 metre freestyle, winning the gold medal in world junior record time. In 2018, he was Commonwealth Games champion in the 200 metre freestyle. He also won a gold medal in the 100 metre freestyle at the 2018 Pan Pacific Swimming Championships and a silver medal at the 2019 World Aquatics Championships in Gwangju in the 100 metre freestyle. He won his second Olympic medal in the 100 metre freestyle Olympic Games event at the 2020 Tokyo Olympics, winning the silver medal with a time of 47.08 in the final. In 2022, he won the gold medal in the 100 metre freestyle at the 2022 Commonwealth Games and the 2022 World Short Course Championships. He is most well known for his clutch performing back-end splits.

At the 2024 Paris Olympics, Chalmers won the silver medal in the 100m freestyle with a time of 47.48 seconds. In the Men's 4x100m freestyle relay final, he delivered an anchor leg split of 46.59 seconds, the fastest of any swimmer in the race, helping his team secure the silver medal.

== Early life ==
Chalmers was born in Port Lincoln, South Australia and is the son of former Australian rules football player Brett Chalmers. He attended Saint Josephs School Port Lincoln as a young child, on the "Tenison" team. Having moved to Adelaide to pursue better schooling and sporting opportunities, he attended Immanuel College in South Australia. Chalmers has Supraventricular tachycardia.

== Career ==
=== 2014 ===
Medal record

2014 Oceania Championships
Gold medal – first place	100 m freestyle	50.71
Gold medal – first place	50 m butterfly	24.35
Gold medal – first place	4×50 m mixed freestyle	1:38.51
Gold medal – first place	4×100 m mixed freestyle	3:32.06
Silver medal – second place	4×100 m freestyle	3:26.66

In May 2014, Chalmers competed at the Oceania Championships in Auckland. He won the gold medal in the 50 m butterfly with a time of 24.35. He also won the gold medal in the 100 m freestyle, swimming a time of 50.71. In his other individual events, he placed fourth in the 50 m freestyle final, with a time of 23.48 seconds, and eighth in the preliminary heats of the 100 m butterfly with a time of 56.96 before withdrawing from the final. For his relay events, he won a gold medal as part of the mixed 4 × 50 m freestyle relay, splitting 23.26 for the second leg of the relay in the final; a silver medal leading-off the 4 × 100 m freestyle relay in 51.65 seconds in the final; and a gold medal in the mixed 4 × 100 m freestyle relay, splitting 50.84 on the third leg.

In August 2014, Chalmers competed at the Youth Olympics in Nanjing. He won three bronze medals, one in the 4 × 100 m medley relay, one in the mixed 4 × 100 m freestyle relay, and one in the mixed 4 × 100 m medley relay, as well as placing fifth in the 4 × 100 m freestyle relay, ninth in the 50 m butterfly, eleventh in the 50 m freestyle, fifteenth in the 100 m freestyle, and not starting the 200 m freestyle.

=== 2015 ===
In August 2015, Chalmers made his Australian team debut at the 2015 World Championships in Kazan. Swimming the heats of the 4 × 100 m freestyle relay, he split 47.92 on the second leg. Australia finished thirteenth in a time of 3:16.34. Chalmers' split was the fastest amongst the team, which led to his selection for the 4 × 100 m medley relay. He split 47.86 in the heats and was replaced by Cameron McEvoy in the final. Australia eventually won the silver medal.

2015 World Junior Championships
Gold medal – first place	50 m freestyle	22.19
Gold medal – first place	100 m freestyle	48.47 (CR)
Gold medal – first place	4×100 m freestyle	3:17.39
Silver medal – second place	4×200 m freestyle	7:17.76
Silver medal – second place	4×100 m mixed freestyle	3:28.59
Silver medal – second place	4×100 m mixed medley	3:48.27
Bronze medal – third place	4×100 m medley	3:40.21

Later in the month, Chalmers competed at the 2015 World Junior Championships in Singapore. His first event was the 4 × 100 m freestyle relay, where he split 48.41 on the second leg and won the gold medal in a time of 3:17.39. He then competed in the mixed 4 × 100 m medley relay, splitting 47.68 on the freestyle leg; Australia won the silver medal with a final time of 3:48.27. Swimming the second leg of the mixed 4 × 100 m freestyle relay, he split 48.89 and won the silver medal in an overall time of 3:28.59. Chalmers then recorded 22.19 to win the gold medal in the 50 m freestyle. Later in the session, he won a silver medal in 4 × 200 m freestyle relay in 7:17.76; he split 1:50.13 on the third leg. On the final day of competition, Chalmers competed in two events. First was the 100 m freestyle, where he won the gold medal in a time of 48.47, breaking the championship record of 48.87 seconds set by Brazil's Pedro Spajari in the semifinals. Chalmers' final event was the 4 × 100 m medley relay, where he split 48.38 on the freestyle leg. Australia won the bronze medal in 3:40.21.

=== 2016–2017 ===
2016 Summer Olympics
Gold medal – first place	100 m freestyle	47.58 (WJ)
Bronze medal – third place	4×100 m freestyle	3:11.37
Bronze medal – third place	4×100 m medley	3:29.93

At the 2016 Australian Championships in Adelaide, Chalmers qualified for the Olympics by finishing second in the 100 m freestyle. He broke the world junior record with a time of 48.03.

At the 2016 Olympics in Rio de Janeiro, Chalmers' first event was the 4 × 100 m freestyle relay. He split 47.37 on the second leg, and Australia won the bronze medal. Chalmers then competed in the 100 m freestyle. He broke the world junior record in the heats and semifinals, recording times of 47.90 and 47.88, respectively. In the final, Chalmers was in seventh place at the 50 m mark, but managed to win the gold medal in a time of 47.58. This broke the world junior record again, and made him the first Australian to win the event since Michael Wenden in 1968. Chalmers then competed in the 4 × 100 m medley relay. Splitting 46.72 on the anchor leg, he secured another bronze medal, in a final time of 3:29.93.

Chalmers then competed in the 2016 World Cup, which was held in short course. At the Singapore stop, he recorded 46.61 in the 100 m freestyle to break the world junior record. Four days later, at the Tokyo stop, he lowered the mark to 46.12.

In April 2017, Chalmers qualified for the World Championships in Budapest. However, in May, he withdrew from the team to undergo heart surgery. He returned to competition in October 2017.

=== 2018 ===
2018 Commonwealth Games
Gold medal – first place	200 m freestyle	1:45.56
Gold medal – first place	4×100 m freestyle	3:12.96
Gold medal – first place	4×200 m freestyle	7:05.97 (GR)
Gold medal – first place	4×100 m medley	3:31.04 (GR)
Silver medal – second place	100 m freestyle	48.15

In April 2018, Chalmers' competed at the Commonwealth Games on the Gold Coast, which was his first international competition post-operation. On the second day of competition, he competed in two events. The first of which was the 200 m freestyle, where he recorded a time of 1:45.56 to win the gold medal. He then anchored the 4 × 100 m freestyle relay, splitting 48.25; Australia won the gold medal in a time of 3:12.96. On day four, he again swam in two events. In the 100 m freestyle, he tied with South Africa's Chad le Clos to win the silver medal in a time of 48.15. He then split 1:46.47 on the second leg of the 4 × 200 m freestyle relay, winning the gold medal in a games record time of 7:05.97. On the final day of competition, Chalmers anchored the 4 × 100 m medley relay in 47.25, securing the gold medal in a games record time of 3:31.04.

In August 2018, Chalmers competed at the Pan Pacific Championships in Tokyo. On day one, he placed ninth in the 200 m freestyle heats, before withdrawing from the B-final. On day two, he won the gold medal in the 100 m freestyle with a time of 48.00 seconds. He then competed in the 4 × 200 m freestyle relay, splitting 1:46.73 on the second leg; Australia won the silver medal in a time of 7:04.70. The following day, he competed in the 4 × 100 m freestyle relay, splitting 47.50. Australia recorded an overall time of 3:12.53 to initially finished third, but were promoted to the silver medal position after the US were disqualified for failing to swim in their nominated order. Chalmers concluded the competition with the 4 × 100 m medley relay, splitting 46.91 on the freestyle leg. Australia won the bronze medal in a time of 3:30.52.

=== 2019–2020 ===
In July 2019, Chalmers competed at the World Championships in Gwangju, Chalmers won a bronze medal in the 4 × 100 m freestyle relay, splitting 47.06 on the anchor leg to record a final time of 3:11.22. The following day, he placed thirteenth in the semifinals of the 200 m freestyle with a time of 1:46.21. In the 100 m freestyle, he swam a personal best time of 47.08 seconds and won the silver medal. He later competed in the 4 × 200 m freestyle relay, splitting 1:45.37 on the second leg and winning the gold medal. Australia's time of 7:00.85 broke the national record of 7:01.65 from 2009. Chalmers swam the first leg of the mixed 4 × 100 m freestyle relay, splitting 47.37. Australia won the silver medal with a national record time of 3:19.97. On the final day of competition, Chalmers split 46.60 on the freestyle leg of the 4 × 100 m medley relay to place fifth in 3:30.42.

2020 Summer Olympics
Silver medal – second place	100 m freestyle	47.08
Bronze medal – third place	4×100 m freestyle	3:10.22
Bronze medal – third place	4×200 m freestyle	7:01.84

In August 2019, Chalmers had another heart surgery.

Chalmers competed in the inaugural season of the International Swimming League, representing London Roar; The competition took place in short course. In the final in Las Vegas, Chalmers went 20.74 to set a new Australian record in the 50 m freestyle.

In November 2020, Chalmers underwent shoulder surgery.

=== 2021 ===
For his first race of the 2020 Olympics, Chalmers anchored the Australian men's relay team to help win the bronze medal in the 4 × 100 m freestyle relay with a time of 3:10.22. Chalmers swam the anchor leg; his split of 46.44 was the fifth-fastest leg of all time. In his second event, the 4 × 200 m freestyle relay, Chalmers helped the Australian relay team secure the bronze medal in the final. He equalled his personal best time of 47.08 seconds in the 100 m freestyle, finishing 0.06 behind the US' Caeleb Dressel to win the silver medal. Chalmers' final event was the 4 × 100 m medley relay, in which he split 46.96 on the freestyle leg; Australia finished fifth in a time of 3:29.60.

In October 2021, Chalmers competed at the FINA World Cup. The series was held in short course. At the Berlin stop, Chalmers swam 1:40.82, surpassing his personal best of 1:41.50. His swim was 0.02 slower than the Australian record. At the Doha stop, Chalmers went 45.03 in the 100 m freestyle. This was the third-fastest performance in history, and it broke the Australian record of 45.46 set by Matthew Abood in 2009. In the 50 m butterfly, Chalmers went 22.24 to break Matt Jaukovic's Australian record of 22.28 from 2009. At the Kazan stop, Chalmers set a new Australian record in the 50 m freestyle, recording a time of 20.68. In the 100 m freestyle, Chalmers went 44.84. This was a new world record, breaking the mark of 44.94 set by France's Amaury Leveaux in 2008.

In early November, Chalmers was announced as one of two Australians entered to compete at the 2021 World Short Course Championships in Abu Dhabi in December. However, Chalmers later withdrew from the competition to address an ongoing shoulder injury.

=== 2022 ===
==== Long course ====
In May 2022, Chalmers competed at the Australian Championships in Adelaide. Chalmers automatically qualified for the Commonwealth Games in Birmingham, as per a selection clause granted to individual medalists from the Tokyo Olympics. Chalmers only contested the butterfly events, and was also selected for the World Championships in Budapest.

2022 World Championships
Gold medal – first place	4×100 m mixed freestyle	3:19.38 (WR)
Silver medal – second place	4×100 m freestyle	3:10.80

In June 2022, Chalmers competed at the World Championships. In the men's 4 × 100 m freestyle relay, he split 46.60 on the anchor leg, winning the silver medal in an overall time of 3:10.80. He placed twenty-second in the 100 m butterfly heats in a time of 52.70. Recording 46.98 on the second leg, Chalmers won the gold medal in the mixed 4 × 100 m freestyle relay, setting a world record of 3:19.38. Splitting 46.89 for the freestyle leg of the 4 × 100 m medley relay on the final day, he helped achieve a fourth-place finish in 3:31.81.

In July–August 2022, Chalmers competed at the Commonwealth Games. He placed tenth in the 50 m butterfly in a time of 23.65. Later in the session, he won a gold medal in the mixed 4 × 100 m freestyle relay, splitting 47.55 on the second leg. Australia established a games record of 3:21:18. The following day, he won a gold medal in the 4 × 100 m freestyle relay, splitting 47.02 on the anchor leg to win the gold medal in a games record time of 3:11.12. Chalmers qualified fastest for the 100 m freestyle final, recording a time of 47.36 to break Brent Hayden's games record of 47.98 from 2010. He won the gold medal the following evening in a time of 47.51. On the final day, he split a 46.86 for the freestyle leg of the 4 × 100 m medley relay, contributing to a silver medal result in a time of 3:31.88.

==== Short course ====
2022 World Championships (25 m)
Gold medal – first place	100 m freestyle	45.16 (CR)
Gold medal – first place	4×50 m freestyle	1:23.44 (OC)
Gold medal – first place	4×100 m medley	3:18.98 (WR)
Silver medal – second place	4×100 m freestyle	3:04.63 (OC)
Silver medal – second place	4×200 m freestyle	6:46.54 (OC)
Silver medal – second place	4×50 m mixed freestyle	1:28.03 (OC)
Bronze medal – third place	4×50 m medley	1:30.81 (OC)

Chalmers competed at the World Short Course Championships in Melbourne. On the first day, he split 44.98 on the anchor leg of the 4 × 100 m freestyle relay, winning the silver medal in an Oceanian record time of 3:04.63. Two days later, he won the gold medal in the 100 m freestyle with a championship record time of 45.16 seconds. Later in the session, he won a gold medal in the men's 4 × 50 m freestyle relay, anchoring the team to a new Oceanian record of 1:23.44.

On day four, Chalmers led off mixed 4 × 50 m freestyle relay, splitting 20.97 and winning the silver medal in an overall time of 1:28.03, which was a new Australian record. Later in the session, he split 1:40.35 on the second leg of the 4 × 200 m freestyle relay. Australia won the silver medal in 6:46.54, which was a new national record and the second-fastest time in history. The following day, he anchored the 4 × 50 m medley relay, splitting 20.48. Australia won the bronze medal in an Oceanian record time of 1:30.81. Later in the evening, he went 20.92 to place seventh in the 50 m freestyle. He swam the anchor leg of the 4 × 100 m medley relay. He trailed Italy and the US, but split 44.63 to break the world record of 3:19.16, set by Russia in 2009, and win in a dead-heat with the US in a time of 3:18.98.

=== 2023–2024 ===
In July 2023, Chalmers competed at the World Championships in Fukuoka. He swam in the men's 4 × 100 m freestyle relay, splitting 46.56 on the anchor leg; Australia won the gold medal in a time of 3:10.16. Chalmers' next event was the 100 m freestyle, in which he won the gold medal in a time of 47.15. He then competed in the mixed 4 × 100 m freestyle relay, splitting 47.25 on the second leg; Australia won the gold medal in a world record time of 3:18.83. Chalmers' final event was the 4 × 100 m medley relay, in which he split 46.89 on the freestyle leg; Australia won the bronze medal in a time of 3:29.62.

In August 2024, Chalmers competed in the Olympics in Paris. His first event was the 4 × 100 m freestyle relay, where he split 46.59 on the anchor leg; Australia won the silver medal in a time of 3:10.35. He then swam in the 100m freestyle, winning the silver medal in a time of 47.48. His final event was the 4 × 100 m medley relay. Swimming the freestyle leg, Chalmers split 47.43 to help Australia finish sixth in an overall time of 3:31.86.

=== 2025 ===
In July–August 2025, Chalmers competed at the World Championships in Singapore. His first event was the 4 × 100 m freestyle relay. He swam the anchor leg, diving in behind the US' Jonny Kulow. Chalmers split 46.53 to overtake Kulow and win the gold medal in a time of 3:08.97. Australia's time was a new championship record, surpassing the US' mark of 3:09.06 from 2019, and was also a new national record. Chalmers then competed in the 100 m freestyle, winning the bronze medal in a time of 47.17. His final event was the 4 × 100 m medley relay, in which he split 48.35 on the freestyle leg; Australia finished eleventh in a time of 3:32.87.

== Personal life ==
In June 2024, Chalmers announced his engagement to Norwegian swimmer Ingeborg Løyning. They have a daughter, born in August 2025. Chalmers and Løyning were married in Port Lincoln, South Australia in January 2026.

== International championships (50 m) ==
Meet	50 free	100 free	200 free	50 fly	100 fly	4×100 free	4×200 free	4×100 medley	4×50 mixed free	4×100 mixed free	4×100 mixed medley
Junior level
YOG 2014	11th	15th	DNS	9th		5th	—N/a	3rd place, bronze medalist(s)	—N/a	3rd place, bronze medalist(s)	(bronze) ^{[a]}
WJC 2015	1st place, gold medalist(s)	1st place, gold medalist(s)				1st place, gold medalist(s)	2nd place, silver medalist(s)	3rd place, bronze medalist(s)	—N/a	2nd place, silver medalist(s)	2nd place, silver medalist(s)
Senior level
OSC 2014	4th	1st place, gold medalist(s)		1st place, gold medalist(s)	8th (h)	2nd place, silver medalist(s)			1st place, gold medalist(s)	1st place, gold medalist(s)	
WC 2015						13th		(silver) ^{[a]}	—N/a		
OG 2016		1st place, gold medalist(s)		—N/a		3rd place, bronze medalist(s)		3rd place, bronze medalist(s)	—N/a	—N/a	—N/a
CG 2018		2nd place, silver medalist(s)	1st place, gold medalist(s)			1st place, gold medalist(s)	1st place, gold medalist(s)	1st place, gold medalist(s)	—N/a	—N/a	—N/a
PAC 2018		1st place, gold medalist(s)	9th (h)	—N/a		2nd place, silver medalist(s)	2nd place, silver medalist(s)	3rd place, bronze medalist(s)	—N/a	—N/a	
WC 2019		2nd place, silver medalist(s)	13th			3rd place, bronze medalist(s)	1st place, gold medalist(s)	5th	—N/a	2nd place, silver medalist(s)	
OG 2020		2nd place, silver medalist(s)		—N/a		3rd place, bronze medalist(s)	3rd place, bronze medalist(s)	5th	—N/a	—N/a	
WC 2022					22nd	2nd place, silver medalist(s)		4th	—N/a	1st place, gold medalist(s)	
CG 2022		1st place, gold medalist(s)		10th	DNS	1st place, gold medalist(s)		2nd place, silver medalist(s)	—N/a	1st place, gold medalist(s)	
WC 2023		1st place, gold medalist(s)				1st place, gold medalist(s)	3rd place, bronze medalist(s)	3rd place, bronze medalist(s)	—N/a	1st place, gold medalist(s)	
OG 2024		2nd place, silver medalist(s)		—N/a		2nd place, silver medalist(s)			—N/a	—N/a	3rd place, bronze medalist(s)
WC 2025	20th	3rd place, bronze medalist(s)				1st place, gold medalist(s)			—N/a		

^{a} Chalmers swam only in the preliminaries.

== International championships (25 m) ==
Meet	50 freestyle	100 freestyle	200 freestyle	4×50 freestyle	4×100 freestyle	4×200 freestyle	4×50 medley	4×100 medley	4×50 mixed freestyle
WC 2022	7th	1st place, gold medalist(s)	DNS	1st place, gold medalist(s)	2nd place, silver medalist(s)	2nd place, silver medalist(s)	3rd place, bronze medalist(s)	1st place, gold medalist(s)	2nd place, silver medalist(s)

== Personal best times ==
=== Long course metres (50 m pool) ===
Event	Time	Meet	Location	Date	Ref
50 m freestyle	21.98	2024 Australian Championships	Gold Coast, Queensland	19 April 2024	
100 m freestyle	47.08	2019 World Aquatics Championships 2020 Summer Olympics	Gwangju, South Korea Tokyo, Japan	25 July 2019 29 July 2021	
200 m freestyle	1:45.48	2021 Australian Olympic Trials	Adelaide, South Australia	13 June 2021	
50 m butterfly	23.10	2024 Australian Championships	Gold Coast, Queensland	17 April 2024	
100 m butterfly	51.37	2020 New South Wales Open Championships	Sydney, New South Wales	15 March 2020	

=== Short course metres (25 m pool) ===
Event	Time		Meet	Location	Date	Notes	Ref
50 m freestyle	20.68		2021 FINA Swimming World Cup	Kazan, Russia	28 October 2021	OC	
100 m freestyle	44.84		2021 FINA Swimming World Cup	Kazan, Russia	29 October 2021	WR	
200 m freestyle	1:40.82		2021 FINA Swimming World Cup	Berlin, Germany	3 October 2021		
50 m butterfly	22.24		2021 FINA Swimming World Cup	Doha, Qatar	23 October 2021	OC	
100 m butterfly	52.49	h	2016 FINA Swimming World Cup	Singapore	22 October 2016		

Legend: WR – World record; OC – Oceanian record; CR – Commonwealth record; NR – Australian record; e – equalled existing record;
Records not set in finals: h – heat; sf – semifinal; r – relay 1st leg; rh – relay heat 1st leg; b – B final; † – en route to final mark; so – swim-off; tt – time trial

== Swimming World Cup circuits ==
The following medals Chalmers has won at Swimming World Cup circuits.

Edition	Gold medals	Silver medals	Bronze medals	Total
2015	0	1	0	1
2016	5	1	0	6
2018	4	4	2	10
2021	7	4	1	12
2022	3	3	1	7
Total	19	13	4	36

== World records ==
=== World junior records ===
No.	Event	Format	Time		Meet	Location	Date	Age	Status	Ref
1	100 m freestyle	long course	48.03		2016 Australian Swimming Championships	Adelaide, South Australia	11 April 2016	17	Former	
2	100 m freestyle (2)	long course	47.90	h	2016 Summer Olympics	Rio de Janeiro, Brazil	9 August 2016	18	Former	
3	100 m freestyle (3)	long course	47.88	sf	2016 Summer Olympics	Rio de Janeiro, Brazil	9 August 2016	18	Former	
4	100 m freestyle (4)	long course	47.58		2016 Summer Olympics	Rio de Janeiro, Brazil	10 August 2016	18	Former	
5	100 m freestyle	short course	46.61		2016 FINA Swimming World Cup	Singapore	21 October 2016	18	Former	
6	100 m freestyle (2)	short course	46.12		2016 FINA Swimming World Cup	Tokyo, Japan	25 October 2016	18	Former	

Legend: h – heat; sf – semifinal

=== World records ===
No.	Event	Format	Time (Split)	Meet	Location	Date	Age	Status	Ref
1	100 m freestyle	short course	44.84	2021 FINA Swimming World Cup	Kazan, Russia	29 October 2021	23	Current	
2	4×100 m mixed freestyle	long course	3:19.38 (46.98)	2022 World Aquatics Championships	Budapest, Hungary	24 June 2022	24	Former	
3	4×100 m medley	short course	3:18.98 (44.63)	2022 World Short Course Championships	Melbourne	18 December 2022	24	Former	
4	4×100 m mixed freestyle	long course	3:18.83 (47.25)	2023 World Aquatics Championships	Fukuoka, Japan	29 July 2023	25	Former	

== Continental and national records ==
=== Long course metres (50 m pool) ===
No.	Event	Time (Split)	Meet	Location	Date	Age	Type	Status	Notes	Ref
1	4×100 m freestyle	3:12.26 (48.24)	2016 Australian Swimming Championships	Adelaide, South Australia	14 April 2016	17	ACR	Current		
2	4×200 m freestyle	7:00.85 (1:45.37)	2019 World Aquatics Championships	Gwangju, South Korea	26 July 2019	21	OC, NR	Current		
3	4×100 m mixed freestyle	3:19.97 (47.37)	2019 World Aquatics Championships	Gwangju, South Korea	27 July 2019	21	OC, NR	Former	Former CR	
4	4×100 m mixed freestyle (2)	3:19.38 (46.98)	2022 World Aquatics Championships	Budapest, Hungary	24 June 2022	24	OC, NR	Current	WR, CR	

Legend: WR – World record; OC – Oceanian record; CR – Commonwealth record; NR – Australian record; e – equalled existing record; ACR – Australian All Comers record;
Records not set in finals: h – heat; sf – semifinal; r – relay 1st leg; rh – relay heat 1st leg; b – B final; † – en route to final mark; so – swim-off; tt – time trial

=== Short course metres (25 m pool) ===
No.	Event	Time	Meet	Location	Date	Age	Type	Status	Notes	Ref
1	50 m freestyle	20.74	2019 International Swimming League	Las Vegas, United States	20 December 2019	21	OC, NR	Former		
2	100 m freestyle	45.03	2021 FINA Swimming World Cup	Doha, Qatar	22 October 2021	23	OC, NR	Former	Former CR	
3	50 m butterfly	22.24	2021 FINA Swimming World Cup	Doha, Qatar	23 October 2021	23	OC, NR	Current		
4	50 m freestyle (2)	20.68	2021 FINA Swimming World Cup	Kazan, Russia	28 October 2021	23	OC, NR	Current		
5	100 m freestyle (2)	44.84	2021 FINA Swimming World Cup	Kazan, Russia	29 October 2021	23	OC, NR	Current	WR, CR	
6	100 m freestyle (3)	45.55	2022 Australian Short Course Championships	Sydney	25 August 2022	24	ACR	Former		
7	4×100 m freestyle	3:04.63 (44.98)	2022 World Short Course Championships	Melbourne	13 December 2022	24	OC, NR	Current	CR	
8	100 m freestyle (3)	45.16	2022 World Short Course Championships	Melbourne	15 December 2022	24	ACR	Current		
9	4×50 m freestyle	1:23.44 (20.34)	2022 World Short Course Championships	Melbourne	15 December 2022	24	OC, NR, ACR	Current	CR	
10	4×50 m mixed freestyle	1:28.03 (20.97)	2022 World Short Course Championships	Melbourne	16 December 2022	24	OC, NR	Current	CR	
11	4×200 m freestyle	6:46.54 (1:40.35)	2022 World Short Course Championships	Melbourne	16 December 2022	24	OC, NR	Current	CR	
12	4×50 m medley	1:30.81 (20.48)	2022 World Short Course Championships	Melbourne	17 December 2022	24	OC, NR	Current	CR	
13	4×100 m medley	3:18.98 (44.63)	2022 World Short Course Championships	Melbourne	18 December 2022	24	OC, NR, ACR	Current	WR, CR	

Legend: WR – World record; OC – Oceanian record; CR – Commonwealth record; NR – Australian record; e – equalled existing record; ACR – Australian All Comers record;
Records not set in finals: h – heat; sf – semifinal; r – relay 1st leg; rh – relay heat 1st leg; b – B final; † – en route to final mark; so – swim-off; tt – time trial

== Recognition ==
- 2016 – Australian Institute of Sport Performance Awards – Male Athlete of the Year and Best Sporting Moment
- 2016 – Swimming Australia Awards – Olympic Swimmer of the Year and Golden Moment
- 2016 – South Australian Sports Star of the Year
- 2016, 2018 – SwimSwam Swammy Award – Oceania Male Swimmer of the Year
- 2016 – SwimSwam Swammy Award – Junior Male Swimmer of the Year
- 2019 – Swimming Australia Awards – Patron's Award
- 2019 – Australian Institute of Sport Awards – Finalist for Male Athlete of the Year
- 2021–2022 – SwimSwam – Top 100 (Men's): 2021 (#13), 2022 (#10)
- 2021 – Swimming World – The Week That Was: 1 November 2021 (#1), 8 November 2021 (#4)
- 2021 – FINA – Top 10 Moments: 2021 Swimming World Cup (#9)

== See also ==
- List of Olympic medalists in swimming (men)
- World record progression 100 metres freestyle
- World record progression 4 × 100 metres freestyle relay (mixed)
- List of Australian records in swimming
