= List of Vanuatuan records in swimming =

The Vanuatuan records in swimming are the fastest ever performances of swimmers from Vanuatu, which are recognised and ratified by the Vanuatu Aquatics Federation.

All records were set in finals unless noted otherwise.

== Long Course (50 m) ==
=== Men ===
Event	Time		Name	Club	Date	Meet	Location	Ref
50 m freestyle	25.83	h	Leo Lebot	Vanuatu	25 July 2026	Commonwealth Games	Glasgow, United Kingdom	
100 m freestyle	58.68	h	Leo Lebot	Vanuatu	24 July 2026	Commonwealth Games	Glasgow, United Kingdom	
200 m freestyle	2:46.58	h	Jessy Misak	Vanuatu	11 July 2019	Pacific Games	Apia, Samoa	
400 m freestyle	6:13.03		Noel Pakoa	Vanuatu Sharks	14 April 2018	Grand Prix 3	Suva, Fiji	
800 m freestyle								
1500 m freestyle								
50 m backstroke	34.68	h	Leo Lebot	Vanuatu	7 August 2023	Commonwealth Youth Games	Trinidad, Trinidad and Tobago	
100 m backstroke	1:27.85	b	Vasir Edmond	Vanuatu	June 2018	Oceania Championships	Port Moresby, Papua New Guinea	
200 m backstroke								
50 m breaststroke	37.24	h	Leo Lebot	Vanuatu	21 November 2023	Pacific Games	Honiara, Solomon Islands	
100 m breaststroke	1:26.21	h	Leo Lebot	Vanuatu	8 August 2023	Commonwealth Youth Games	Trinidad, Trinidad and Tobago	
200 m breaststroke								
50 m butterfly	28.67	h	Leo Lebot	Vanuatu	28 July 2026	Commonwealth Games	Glasgow, United Kingdom	
100 m butterfly	1:14.05		Noel Pakoa	-				
200 m butterfly								
200 m individual medley	2:37.04	h	Hollingsword Wolul	Vanuatu	12 July 2019	Pacific Games	Apia, Samoa	
400 m individual medley								
4×100 m freestyle relay								
4×200 m freestyle relay								
4×100 m medley relay								

Legend: # – Record awaiting ratification by Vanuatu Aquatics Federation; WR – World record; OC – Oceanian record;
Records not set in finals: h – heat; sf – semifinal; r – relay 1st leg; rh – relay heat 1st leg; b – B final; † – en route to final mark; so – swim-off; tt – time trial

=== Women ===
Event	Time		Name	Club	Date	Meet	Location	Ref
50 m freestyle	28.11	h	Loane Russet	Vanuatu	28 July 2026	Commonwealth Games	Glasgow, United Kingdom	
100 m freestyle	1:03.13	h	Loane Russet	Vanuatu	31 July 2025	World Championships	Singapore, Singapore	
200 m freestyle								
400 m freestyle								
800 m freestyle								
1500 m freestyle								
50 m backstroke	42.84	h	Pamela Mesa	Vanuatu	7 August 2023	Commonwealth Youth Games	Trinidad, Trinidad and Tobago	
100 m backstroke	1:38.71	h	Chloe Ameara	Vanuatu	24 November 2023	Pacific Games	Honiara, Solomon Islands	
200 m backstroke								
50 m breaststroke	48.32	h	Chloe Ameara	Vanuatu	21 November 2023	Pacific Games	Honiara, Solomon Islands	
100 m breaststroke	1:52.66		Joeline Tasso	Vanuatu Sharks	14 April 2018	Grand Prix 3	Suva, Fiji	
200 m breaststroke								
50 m butterfly	30.69	h	Loane Russet	Vanuatu	1 August 2025	World Championships	Singapore, Singapore	
100 m butterfly								
200 m butterfly								
200 m individual medley	3:33.55		Chloe Ameara	Vanuatu	21 November 2023	Pacific Games	Honiara, Solomon Islands	
400 m individual medley								
4×100 m freestyle relay								
4×200 m freestyle relay								
4×100 m medley relay								

Legend: # – Record awaiting ratification by Vanuatu Aquatics Federation; WR – World record; OC – Oceanian record;
Records not set in finals: h – heat; sf – semifinal; r – relay 1st leg; rh – relay heat 1st leg; b – B final; † – en route to final mark; so – swim-off; tt – time trial

== Short Course (25 m) ==
=== Men ===
Event	Time		Name	Club	Date	Meet	Location	Ref
50 m freestyle	29.76	h	Jessy Misak	Vanuatu	13 December 2018	World Championships	Hangzhou, China	
100 m freestyle								
200 m freestyle								
400 m freestyle								
800 m freestyle								
1500 m freestyle								
50 m backstroke	37.46	h	Hollingsword Wolul	Vanuatu	13 December 2018	World Championships	Hangzhou, China	
100 m backstroke								
200 m backstroke								
50 m breaststroke	36.39	h	Hollingsword Wolul	Vanuatu	15 December 2018	World Championships	Hangzhou, China	
100 m breaststroke								
200 m breaststroke								
50 m butterfly	33.19	h	Jessy Misak	Vanuatu	14 December 2018	World Championships	Hangzhou, China	
100 m butterfly								
200 m butterfly								
100 m individual medley								
200 m individual medley								
400 m individual medley								
4×50 m freestyle relay								
4×100 m freestyle relay								
4×200 m freestyle relay								
4×50 m medley relay								
4×100 m medley relay								

Legend: # – Record awaiting ratification by Vanuatu Aquatics Federation; WR – World record; OC – Oceanian record;
Records not set in finals: h – heat; sf – semifinal; r – relay 1st leg; rh – relay heat 1st leg; b – B final; † – en route to final mark; so – swim-off; tt – time trial

=== Women ===
Event	Time	Name	Club	Date	Meet	Location	Ref
50 m freestyle							
100 m freestyle							
200 m freestyle							
400 m freestyle							
800 m freestyle							
1500 m freestyle							
50 m backstroke							
100 m backstroke							
200 m backstroke							
50 m breaststroke							
100 m breaststroke							
200 m breaststroke							
50 m butterfly							
100 m butterfly							
200 m butterfly							
100 m individual medley							
200 m individual medley							
400 m individual medley							
4×50 m freestyle relay							
4×100 m freestyle relay							
4×200 m freestyle relay							
4×50 m medley relay							
4×100 m medley relay							

Legend: # – Record awaiting ratification by Vanuatu Aquatics Federation; WR – World record; OC – Oceanian record;
Records not set in finals: h – heat; sf – semifinal; r – relay 1st leg; rh – relay heat 1st leg; b – B final; † – en route to final mark; so – swim-off; tt – time trial
