= Josha Salchow =

German swimmer

Personal information
- Nationality: German
- Born: 2 July 1999 (age 27) Troisdorf, Germany
- Height: 2.01 m (6 ft 7 in)

Sport
- Sport: Swimming

Josha Salchow (born 2 July 1999) is a German competitive swimmer. He represented Germany at the 2024 Summer Olympics.
