= Wang Haoyu (swimmer) =

Chinese swimmer (born 2005)

Personal information
- Nationality: Chinese
- Born: 27 July 2005 (age 21) Jiaozuo, Henan, China

Sport
- Sport: Swimming
- Strokes: Freestyle
Medal record
Men's swimming
Representing China
World Championships (LC)
Gold medal – first place	2024 Doha	4×100 m freestyle
Gold medal – first place	2024 Doha	4×200 m freestyle
Gold medal – first place	2024 Doha	4×100 m mixed freestyle
Asian Games
Gold medal – first place	2022 Hangzhou	4×100 m freestyle
Gold medal – first place	2022 Hangzhou	4×100 m medley
Gold medal – first place	2026 Aichi–Nagoya	4×100 m freestyle
Gold medal – first place	2026 Aichi–Nagoya	4×200 m freestyle
Silver medal – second place	2022 Hangzhou	100 m freestyle
Silver medal – second place	2022 Hangzhou	4×200 m freestyle

Wang Haoyu (born 27 July 2005) is a Chinese swimmer.

He won gold medals in the 4 × 100-metre freestyle and 4 × 200-metre freestyle relays at the 2024 World Championships in Doha, Qatar.

At the 2023 Chinese Spring Championships, at age 17, he won a gold medal in the 100-meter freestyle with a time of 47.89.

== Personal bests ==
=== Long course (50-meter pool) ===
Event	Time	Meet	Date	Note(s)
50 m freestyle	22.42	2023 Chinese National Championships	May 2, 2023	
100 m freestyle	47.89	2023 Chinese Spring National Championships	March 19, 2023	
200 m freestyle	1:47.45	2023 Chinese Spring National Championships	March 22, 2023	
400 m freestyle	3:55.96	2023 Chinese National Championships	May 6, 2023	
800 m freestyle	8:06.76	2023 Chinese Spring National Championships	March 23, 2023	
1500 m freestyle	16:20.98	2021 Chinese Summer National Championships	June 6, 2021	
100 m backstroke	55.74	2021 Chinese Summer National Championships	June 2, 2021	
50 m butterfly	24.76	2023 Chinese Spring National Championships	March 23, 2023	
100 m butterfly	55.00	2021 Chinese Summer National Championships	June 4, 2021	
200 m butterfly	2:07.15	2021 Chinese Summer National Championships	June 2, 2021	
200 m individual medley	2:06.23	2020 Chinese National Championships	October 1, 2020	
400 m individual medley	4:42.466	2020 Chinese National Championships	September 27, 2020	

=== Short course (25-meter pool) ===
Event	Time	Meet	Date	Note(s)
50 m freestyle	21.60	2022 World Championships	December 16, 2022	
100 m freestyle	46.78	2022 Chinese National Swimming Championships	October 28, 2022	
200 m freestyle	1:51.46	2022 Chinese National Swimming Championships	October 29, 2022	
