= Sergio de Celis =

Spanish swimmer (born 2000)

Personal information
- Full name: Sergio de Celis Montalbán
- Born: 18 January 2000 (age 26) Palma, Spain
- Height: 1.95 m (6 ft 5 in)

Sport
- Sport: Swimming
Medal record
Representing Spain
European Championships (SC)
Bronze medal – third place	2025 Lublin	4×50 m medley

Sergio de Celis Montalbán (Note: In this Spanish name, the first or paternal surname is de Celis and the second or maternal family name is Montalbán.) (born 18 January 2000) is a Spanish competitive swimmer. He represented Spain at the 2024 Summer Olympics.
