= New Zealand at the 2023 World Aquatics Championships =

- Flag of New Zealand
- World Aquatics code: NZL
- National federation: Swimming New Zealand
- Website: swimmingnz.org

in Fukuoka, Japan
- Competitors: 49 in 5 sports
- Medals Ranked 26th: Gold 0 Silver 0 Bronze 1 Total 1

World Aquatics Championships appearances
- 1973; 1975; 1978; 1982; 1986; 1991; 1994; 1998; 2001; 2003; 2005; 2007; 2009; 2011; 2013; 2015; 2017; 2019; 2022; 2023; 2024; 2025

New Zealand competed at the 2023 World Aquatics Championships in Fukuoka, Japan from 14 to 30 July.

== Medalists ==
| Medal | Name | Sport | Event | Date |
|---|---|---|---|---|
| Bronze | Erika Fairweather | Swimming | Women's 400 m freestyle | July 23 |

== Athletes by discipline ==
The following is the list of number of competitors who participated at the Championships per discipline.

| Sport | Men | Women | Total |
|---|---|---|---|
| Artistic swimming | 0 | 10 | 10 |
| Diving | 6 | 3 | 9 |
| High diving | 1 | 0 | 1 |
| Swimming | 8 | 7 | 15 |
| Water polo | 0 | 14 | 14 |
| Total | 15 | 34 | 49 |

== Artistic swimming ==
New Zealand entered 10 artistic swimmers.

Women

| Athlete | Event | Preliminaries | | Final | |
| Athlete | Event | Points | Rank | Points | Rank |
|---|---|---|---|---|---|
| Eva Morris; Eden Worsley | Duet technical routine | 157.3483 | 34 | Did not advance | |
| Eva Morris; Eden Worsley | Duet free routine | 127.0959 | 27 | Did not advance | |

Mixed

| Athlete | Event | Preliminaries | | Final | |
| Athlete | Event | Points | Rank | Points | Rank |
|---|---|---|---|---|---|
| Ashley Armstrong; Chloe Boyt; Ariel Chen; Avalee Donovan-Trewhella; Isabelle Hitchen; Eva Morris; Karlina Steiner; Eden Worsley | Team acrobatic routine | 153.0934 | 17 | Did not advance | |
| Ashley Armstrong; Chloe Boyt; Evie Caple; Ariel Chen; Avalee Donovan-Trewhella; Sascha Fox; Eva Morris; Eden Worsley | Team technical routine | 162.9192 | 19 | Did not advance | |
| Ashley Armstrong; Chloe Boyt; Evie Caple; Ariel Chen; Sascha Fox; Eva Morris; Karlina Steiner; Eden Worsley | Team free routine | 150.0363 | 17 | Did not advance | |

== Diving ==
New Zealand entered 9 divers.

Men

| Athlete | Event | Preliminaries | | Semifinal | | Final | |
| Athlete | Event | Points | Rank | Points | Rank | Points | Rank |
|---|---|---|---|---|---|---|---|
| Nathan Brown | 10 m platform | 351.15 | 24 | Did not advance | | | |
| Anton Down-Jenkins | 3 m springboard | 353.55 | 34 | Did not advance | | | |
| Luke Sipkes | 10 m platform | 315.35 | 37 | Did not advance | | | |
| Liam Stone | 3 m springboard | 381.25 | 20 | Did not advance | | | |
| Liam Stone; Frazer Tavener | 3 m synchronized springboard | 325.32 | 20 | — | | Did not advance | |
| Arno Lee; Luke Sipkes | 10 m synchronized platform | 306.81 | 15 | — | | Did not advance | |

Women

| Athlete | Event | Preliminaries | | Semifinal | | Final | |
| Athlete | Event | Points | Rank | Points | Rank | Points | Rank |
|---|---|---|---|---|---|---|---|
| Mikali Dawson | 10 m platform | 228.75 | 32 | Did not advance | | | |
| Elizabeth Roussel | 1 m springboard | 235.65 | 13 | — | | Did not advance | |
| Elizabeth Roussel | 3 m springboard | 277.10 | 17 Q | 287.60 | 14 | Did not advance | |
| Maggie Squire | 3 m springboard | Did not start | | | | | |
| Elizabeth Roussel; Maggie Squire | 3 m synchronized springboard | 230.40 | 16 | — | | Did not advance | |

Mixed

| Athlete | Event | Final | |
| Athlete | Event | Points | Rank |
|---|---|---|---|
| Maggie Squire; Frazer Tavener | 3 m synchronized springboard | 241.50 | 13 |
| Mikali Dawson; Anton Down-Jenkins; Elizabeth Roussel; Luke Sipkes | Team event | 270.90 | 13 |

== High diving ==
New Zealand entered 1 male high diver.

| Athlete | Event | Points | Rank |
|---|---|---|---|
| Braden Rumpit | Men's high diving | 269.20 | 17 |

== Swimming ==
New Zealand entered 16 swimmers.

Men

| Athlete | Event | Heat | | Semifinal | | Final | |
| Athlete | Event | Time | Rank | Time | Rank | Time | Rank |
|---|---|---|---|---|---|---|---|
| Lewis Clareburt | 100 metre butterfly | 52.89 | 33 | Did not advance | | | |
| Lewis Clareburt | 200 metre butterfly | 1:56.23 | 15 Q | 1:56.44 | 13 | Did not advance | |
| Lewis Clareburt | 200 metre individual medley | 1:58.08 | 5 Q | 1:58.01 | 12 | Did not advance | |
| Lewis Clareburt | 400 metre individual medley | 4:12.85 | 8 Q | — | | 4:11.29 | 6 |
| Joshua Gilbert | 50 metre breaststroke | 27.59 | 23 | Did not advance | | | |
| Joshua Gilbert | 100 metre breaststroke | 1:01.79 | 33 | Did not advance | | | |
| Joshua Gilbert | 200 metre breaststroke | 2:13.59 | 29 | Did not advance | | | |
| Cameron Gray | 100 metre freestyle | 48.43 | 19 | Did not advance | | | |
| Cameron Gray | 50 metre butterfly | 23.57 | 25 | Did not advance | | | |
| Luan Grobbelaar | 400 metre individual medley | 4:21.54 | 20 | — | | Did not advance | |
| Andrew Jeffcoat | 50 metre backstroke | 24.95 | 11 Q | 24.81 | 8 Q | 24.66 | 7 |
| Andrew Jeffcoat | 100 metre backstroke | 53.82 | 13 Q | 53.46 | 12 | Did not advance | |
| Andrew Jeffcoat | 200 metre backstroke | 1:59.01 | 18 | Did not advance | | | |
| Michael Pickett | 50 metre freestyle | 22.41 | 35 | Did not advance | | | |
| Zac Reid | 200 metre freestyle | 1:51.66 | 41 | Did not advance | | | |
| Zac Reid | 400 metre freestyle | 3:55.55 | 32 | — | | Did not advance | |
| Zac Reid | 800 metre freestyle | 8:06.94 | 30 | — | | Did not advance | |
| Lewis Clareburt; Joshua Gilbert; Cameron Gray; Andrew Jeffcoat | 4 × 100 m medley relay | Disqualified | | — | | Did not advance | |

Women

| Athlete | Event | Heat | | Semifinal | | Final | |
| Athlete | Event | Time | Rank | Time | Rank | Time | Rank |
|---|---|---|---|---|---|---|---|
| Caitlin Deans | 1500 metre freestyle | 16:24.56 | 16 | — | | Did not advance | |
| Chelsey Edwards | 100 metre freestyle | 56.04 | 29 | Did not advance | | | |
| Erika Fairweather | 200 metre freestyle | 1:57.36 | 10 Q | 1:56.87 | 11 | Did not advance | |
| Erika Fairweather | 400 metre freestyle | 4:03.07 | 5 Q | — | | 3:59.59 | 3rd place, bronze medalist(s) |
| Erika Fairweather | 800 metre freestyle | 8:21.06 | 3 Q | — | | 8:28.21 | 8 |
| Helena Gasson | 100 metre backstroke | 1:00.83 | 19 | Did not advance | | | |
| Helena Gasson | 50 metre butterfly | 26.29 | 17 | Did not advance | | | |
| Hazel Ouwehand | 50 metre butterfly | 26.57 | 24 | Did not advance | | | |
| Hazel Ouwehand | 100 metre butterfly | 59.81 | 26 | Did not advance | | | |
| Eve Thomas | 400 metre freestyle | 4:11.33 | 20 | — | | Did not advance | |
| Eve Thomas | 800 metre freestyle | 8:31.72 | 12 | — | | Did not advance | |
| Eve Thomas | 1500 metre freestyle | 16:24.88 | 17 | — | | Did not advance | |
| Monique Wieruszowski | 50 metre breaststroke | | | | | | |
| Caitlin Deans; Erika Fairweather; Summer Osborne; Eve Thomas | 4 × 200 m freestyle relay | 8:00.11 | 11 | — | | Did not advance | |

Mixed

| Athlete | Event | Heat | | Final | |
| Athlete | Event | Time | Rank | Time | Rank |
|---|---|---|---|---|---|
| Cameron Gray; Carter Swift; Helena Gasson; Chelsey Edwards | 4 × 100 m freestyle relay | 3:29.05 | 16 | Did not advance | |
| Helena Gasson; Joshua Gilbert; Vanessa Ouwehand; Carter Swift | 4 × 100 m medley relay | 3:49.26 | 17 | Did not advance | |

== Water polo ==
Summary

| Team | Event | Group stage | | | | Playoff | Quarterfinal | Semifinal | Final / BM | |
| Team | Event | Opposition Score | Opposition Score | Opposition Score | Rank | Opposition Score | Opposition Score | Opposition Score | Opposition Score | Rank |
|---|---|---|---|---|---|---|---|---|---|---|
| New Zealand | Women's tournament | Japan; W 17–16 | Canada; L 11–13 | Hungary; L 5–23 | 3 QP | Italy; L 7–14 | — | Israel; L 12–15 | South Africa; W 25–6 | 11 |

=== Women's tournament ===
Team roster

The following is the New Zealand roster.

Head coach: Angela Winstanley-Smith

- 1 Jessica Milicich GK
- 2 Emily Nicholson FP
- 3 Bernadette Doyle FP
- 4 Libby Gault FP
- 5 Gabrielle Milicich FP
- 6 Aggie Weston FP
- 7 Emmerson Houghton FP
- 8 Katie McKenty FP
- 9 Sophie Shorter-Robinson FP
- 10 Gabriella MacDonald FP
- 11 Kaitlin Howarth FP
- 12 Millie Quin FP
- 13 Samantha Bright GK
- Isabelle Jackson FP

Group play

| Pos | Team | Pld | W | PSW | PSL | L | GF | GA | GD | Pts | Qualification |
|---|---|---|---|---|---|---|---|---|---|---|---|
| 1 | Hungary | 3 | 3 | 0 | 0 | 0 | 60 | 36 | +24 | 9 | Quarterfinals |
| 2 | Canada | 3 | 2 | 0 | 0 | 1 | 40 | 34 | +6 | 6 | Playoffs |
| 3 | New Zealand | 3 | 1 | 0 | 0 | 2 | 33 | 52 | −19 | 3 | Playoffs |
| 4 | Japan (H) | 3 | 0 | 0 | 0 | 3 | 49 | 60 | −11 | 0 | |

Source: Sportresult
Rules for classification: 1) points; 2) head-to-head points; 3) head-to-head goal difference; 4) head-to-head number of goals scored; 5) Goal difference.
(H) Host

| 16 July 2023; 19:00 | Report | New Zealand | 17–16 | Japan | Marine Messe Fukuoka, Fukuoka; Referees: Jennifer McCall (USA), Matan Schwartz (ISR) |
| 16 July 2023; 19:00 | Report | Score by quarters: 5–5, 4–3, 4–5, 4–3 | | | Marine Messe Fukuoka, Fukuoka; Referees: Jennifer McCall (USA), Matan Schwartz (ISR) |
| 16 July 2023; 19:00 | Report | Doyle 5 | Goals | Ura 5 | Marine Messe Fukuoka, Fukuoka; Referees: Jennifer McCall (USA), Matan Schwartz (ISR) |

| 18 July 2023; 16:00 | Report | Canada | 13–11 | New Zealand | Marine Messe Fukuoka, Fukuoka; Referees: Marta Cabanas (ESP), Darren Spiritsanto (USA) |
| 18 July 2023; 16:00 | Report | Score by quarters: 7–4, 1–3, 3–0, 2–4 | | | Marine Messe Fukuoka, Fukuoka; Referees: Marta Cabanas (ESP), Darren Spiritsanto (USA) |
| 18 July 2023; 16:00 | Report | La Roche 3 | Goals | Howarth 4 | Marine Messe Fukuoka, Fukuoka; Referees: Marta Cabanas (ESP), Darren Spiritsanto (USA) |

| 20 July 2023; 12:00 | Report | New Zealand | 5–23 | Hungary | Marine Messe Fukuoka, Fukuoka; Referees: Veselin Mišković (MNE), Marta Cabanas (ESP), |
| 20 July 2023; 12:00 | Report | Score by quarters: 3–6, 0–3, 2–9, 0–5 | | | Marine Messe Fukuoka, Fukuoka; Referees: Veselin Mišković (MNE), Marta Cabanas (ESP), |
| 20 July 2023; 12:00 | Report | Doyle, Houghton 2 | Goals | Szilágyi 5 | Marine Messe Fukuoka, Fukuoka; Referees: Veselin Mišković (MNE), Marta Cabanas (ESP), |

Playoffs

| 22 July 2023; 17:00 | Report | Italy | 14–7 | New Zealand | Marine Messe Fukuoka, Fukuoka; Referees: Germán Moller (ARG), Chisato Kurosaki (JPN) |
| 22 July 2023; 17:00 | Report | Score by quarters: 4–1, 6–2, 1–3, 3–1 | | | Marine Messe Fukuoka, Fukuoka; Referees: Germán Moller (ARG), Chisato Kurosaki (JPN) |
| 22 July 2023; 17:00 | Report | Bettini 3 | Goals | Doyle 2 | Marine Messe Fukuoka, Fukuoka; Referees: Germán Moller (ARG), Chisato Kurosaki (JPN) |

9–12th place semifinals

| 24 July 2023; 12:00 | Report | Israel | 15–12 | New Zealand | Marine Messe Fukuoka, Fukuoka; Referees: Nóra Debreceni (HUN), Chisato Kurosaki (JPN) |
| 24 July 2023; 12:00 | Report | Score by quarters: 3–1, 5–3, 5–2, 2–6 | | | Marine Messe Fukuoka, Fukuoka; Referees: Nóra Debreceni (HUN), Chisato Kurosaki (JPN) |
| 24 July 2023; 12:00 | Report | Strugo 4 | Goals | Houghton, Nicholson 3 | Marine Messe Fukuoka, Fukuoka; Referees: Nóra Debreceni (HUN), Chisato Kurosaki (JPN) |

Eleventh place game

| 26 July 2023; 09:00 | Report | New Zealand | 25–6 | South Africa | Marine Messe Fukuoka, Fukuoka; Referees: Chisato Kurosaki (JPN), Adil Aimbetov (KAZ) |
| 26 July 2023; 09:00 | Report | Score by quarters: 7–0, 6–3, 6–1, 6–2 | | | Marine Messe Fukuoka, Fukuoka; Referees: Chisato Kurosaki (JPN), Adil Aimbetov (KAZ) |
| 26 July 2023; 09:00 | Report | Houghton 7 | Goals | Meecham, Versfeld 2 | Marine Messe Fukuoka, Fukuoka; Referees: Chisato Kurosaki (JPN), Adil Aimbetov (KAZ) |
