= List of New Zealand records in swimming =

Below is a list of current New Zealand swimming records as ratified by the national governing body, Swimming New Zealand.

== Long course (50 m) ==
=== Men ===
| Event | Time | | Name | Club | Date | Meet | Location | Ref |
|---|---|---|---|---|---|---|---|---|
| 50 m freestyle | 21.86 | h | Taiko Torepe-Ormsby | Wharenui | 13 April 2023 | New Zealand Championships | Hawke's Bay, New Zealand | |
| 100 m freestyle | 48.26 | h | Cameron Gray | Coast Swimming Club | 12 April 2024 | New Zealand Championships | Hawke's Bay, New Zealand | |
| 200 m freestyle | 1:45.57 | | Lewis Clareburt | New Zealand | 7 April 2026 | Australian Open | Gold Coast, Australia | |
| 400 m freestyle | 3:46.85 | | Lewis Clareburt | Club 37 | 11 April 2024 | New Zealand Championships | Hawke's Bay, New Zealand | |
| 800 m freestyle | 7:53.06 | h | Zac Reid | New Zealand | 27 July 2021 | Olympic Games | Tokyo, Japan | |
| 1500 m freestyle | 15:15.50 | | Nathan Capp | Greerton | 17 April 2015 | New Zealand Championships | Auckland, New Zealand | |
| 50 m backstroke | 24.65 | | Andrew Jeffcoat | New Zealand | 1 August 2022 | Commonwealth Games | Birmingham, United Kingdom | |
| 100 m backstroke | 53.32 | r | Gareth Kean | Capital | 30 March 2012 | New Zealand Championships | Auckland, New Zealand | |
| 200 m backstroke | 1:57.13 | | Kane Follows | Neptune Swim Club | 12 April 2024 | New Zealand Championships | Hawke's Bay, New Zealand | |
| 50 m breaststroke | 27.06 | | Glenn Snyders | North Shore | 27 March 2012 | New Zealand Championships | Auckland, New Zealand | |
| 100 m breaststroke | 59.78 | h | Glenn Snyders | New Zealand | 28 July 2012 | Olympic Games | London, United Kingdom | |
| 200 m breaststroke | 2:10.55 | h | Glenn Snyders | New Zealand | 29 July 2012 | Olympic Games | London, United Kingdom | |
| 50m butterfly | 23.27 | | Cameron Gray | New Zealand | 30 July 2022 | Commonwealth Games | Birmingham, United Kingdom | |
| 100m butterfly | 51.61 | | Corney Swanepoel | North Shore | 1 April 2009 | New Zealand Championships | Christchurch, New Zealand | |
| 200m butterfly | 1:54.15 | OC | Moss Burmester | New Zealand | 4 April 2009 | New Zealand Championships | Christchurch, New Zealand | |
| 200m individual medley | 1:56.77 | | Lewis Clareburt | New Zealand | 24 July 2026 | Commonwealth Games | Glasgow, United Kingdom | |
| 400m individual medley | 4:08.70 | OC, CR | Lewis Clareburt | New Zealand | 30 July 2022 | Commonwealth Games | Birmingham, United Kingdom | |
| 4×100m freestyle relay | 3:14.07 | | Carter Swift (48.68); Cameron Gray (47.81); Lewis Clareburt (48.43); Zac Dell (49.15) | United Swimming Club | 13 May 2026 | New Zealand Championships | Auckland, New Zealand | |
| 4×200m freestyle relay | 7:13.06 | h | Lewis Clareburt (1:47.97); Matthew Stanley (1:48.10); Daniel Hunter (1:48.88); Zac Reid (1:48.11) | New Zealand | 26 July 2019 | World Championships | Gwangju, South Korea | |
| 4×100m medley relay | 3:31.58 | h | Daniel Bell (53.85); Glenn Snyders (59.75); Corney Swanepoel (50.45); Cameron Gibson (47.53) | New Zealand | 2 August 2009 | World Championships | Rome, Italy | |

Legend: # – Record awaiting ratification by Swimming New Zealand; WR – World record; OC – Oceanian record; CR – Commonwealth record; e – equalled existing record;
Records not set in finals: h – heat; sf – semifinal; r – relay 1st leg; rh – relay heat 1st leg; b – B final; † – en route to final mark; so – swim-off; tt – time trial

=== Women ===
| Event | Time | | Name | Club | Date | Meet | Location | Ref |
|---|---|---|---|---|---|---|---|---|
| 50 m freestyle | 24.97 | | Chelsey Edwards | New Zealand | 23 May 2026 | Mare Nostrum | Monte Carlo, Monaco | |
| 100 m freestyle | 53.91 | sf | Hayley Palmer | New Zealand | 30 July 2009 | World Championships | Rome, Italy | |
| 200 m freestyle | 1:55.05 | | Erika Fairweather | New Zealand | 12 August 2026 | Pan Pacific Championships | Irvine, United States | |
| 400 m freestyle | 3:59.44 | | Erika Fairweather | New Zealand | 11 February 2024 | World Championships | Doha, Qatar | |
| 800 m freestyle | 8:17.65 | | Lauren Boyle | New Zealand | 8 August 2015 | World Championships | Kazan, Russia | |
| 1500 m freestyle | 15:40.14 | | Lauren Boyle | New Zealand | 4 August 2015 | World Championships | Kazan, Russia | |
| 50m backstroke | 27.81 | | Gabrielle Fa'amausili | New Zealand | 29 August 2015 | World Junior Championships | Singapore, Singapore | |
| 100m backstroke | 1:00.22 | = | Emily Thomas | North Shore Swimming | 13 December 2009 | Queensland State Championships | Brisbane, Australia | |
| 100m backstroke | 1:00.22 | h, = | Milan Glintmeyer | Coast | 14 May 2026 | New Zealand Championships | Auckland, New Zealand | |
| 200m backstroke | 2:09.13 | | Melissa Ingram | North Shore Swimming | 15 December 2009 | Queensland State Championships | Brisbane, Australia | |
| 50m breaststroke | 30.38 | | Monique Wieruszowski | North Shore | 13 April 2024 | New Zealand Championships | Hawke's Bay, New Zealand | |
| 100m breaststroke | 1:07.67 | | Monique Wieruszowski | North Shore | 15 March 2024 | Auckland Championships | Auckland, New Zealand | |
| 200m breaststroke | 2:29.09 | h | Brearna Crawford | Indian University | 18 November 2023 | Ohio State Fall Invitational | Columbus, United States | |
| 50m butterfly | 25.43 | | Hazel Ouwehand | Phoenix Aquatics | 23 May 2025 | New Zealand Championships | Auckland, New Zealand | |
| 100m butterfly | 57.43 | h | Hazel Ouwehand | Phoenix Aquatics | 11 April 2024 | New Zealand Championships | Hawke's Bay, New Zealand | |
| 200m butterfly | 2:09.84 | h | Helena Gasson | North Shore Swimming | 28 March 2016 | New Zealand Championships | Auckland, New Zealand | |
| 200m individual medley | 2:12.12 | | Natalie Wiegersma | New Zealand | 4 October 2010 | Commonwealth Games | Delhi, India | |
| 400m individual medley | 4:39.07 | h | Helen Norfolk | - | 25 March 2008 | New Zealand Olympic Trials | Auckland, New Zealand | |
| 4×100m freestyle relay | 3:38.38 | | Erika Fairweather (54.25); Chelsey Edwards (54.29); Zoe Pedersen (54.54); Milan Glintmeyer (55.30) | New Zealand | 14 August 2026 | Pan Pacific Championships | Irvine, United States | |
| 4×200m freestyle relay | 7:51.94 | | Erika Fairweather (1:55.92); Caitlin Deans (1:58.12); Eve Thomas (1:59.57); Milana Tapper (1:58.33) | New Zealand | 27 July 2026 | Commonwealth Games | Glasgow, United Kingdom | |
| 4×100m medley relay | 4:00.82 | | Helena Gasson (1:01.58); Monique Wieruszowski (1:07.84); Hazel Ouwehand (57.40); Laticia-Leigh Transom (54.00) | New Zealand | 13 April 2024 | New Zealand Championships | Hawke's Bay, New Zealand | |

Legend: # – Record awaiting ratification by Swimming New Zealand; WR – World record; OC – Oceanian record; CR – Commonwealth record; e – equalled existing record;
Records not set in finals: h – heat; sf – semifinal; r – relay 1st leg; rh – relay heat 1st leg; b – B final; † – en route to final mark; so – swim-off; tt – time trial

=== Mixed relay ===
| Event | Time | | Name | Club | Date | Meet | Location | Ref |
|---|---|---|---|---|---|---|---|---|
| 4×100 m freestyle relay | 3:24.82 | | Carter Swift (48.67); Cameron Gray (48.33); Chelsey Edwards (54.23); Erika Fairweather (53.59) | New Zealand | 25 July 2026 | Commonwealth Games | Glasgow, United Kingdom | |
| 4×100 m medley relay | 3:49.26 | h | Helena Gasson (1:00.68); Joshua Gilbert (1:01.03); Hazel Ouwehand (59.07); Carter Swift (48.48) | New Zealand | 26 July 2023 | World Championships | Fukuoka, Japan | |

Legend: # – Record awaiting ratification by Swimming New Zealand; WR – World record; OC – Oceanian record; e – equalled existing record;
Records not set in finals: h – heat; so – swim-off

== Short course (25 m) ==
=== Men ===
| Event | Time | | Name | Club | Date | Meet | Location | Ref |
|---|---|---|---|---|---|---|---|---|
| 50m freestyle | 21.17 | | Cameron Gray | New Zealand | 23 October 2025 | World Cup | Toronto, Canada | |
| 100m freestyle | 46.96 | | Carter Swift | New Zealand | 1 November 2024 | World Cup | Singapore, Singapore | |
| 200m freestyle | 1:43.21 | | Lewis Clareburt | New Zealand | 20 October 2024 | World Cup | Shanghai, China | |
| 400m freestyle | 3:40.46 | | Danyon Loader | New Zealand | 11 February 1995 | World Cup | Sheffield, United Kingdom | |
| 800m freestyle | 7:38.85 | | Zac Reid | Aquabladz New Plymouth | 6 October 2020 | New Zealand Championships | Hamilton, New Zealand | |
| 1500m freestyle | 14:38.74 | | Nathan Capp | Greerton | 6 September 2014 | New Zealand Championships | Wellington, New Zealand | |
| 50m backstroke | 22.99 | r | Andrew Jeffcoat | Club 37 | 11 August 2023 | New Zealand Championships | Hawke's Bay, New Zealand | |
| 100m backstroke | 50.83 | r | Andrew Jeffcoat | Club 37 | 9 August 2023 | New Zealand Championships | Hawke's Bay, New Zealand | |
| 200m backstroke | 1:51.91 | | Andrew Jeffcoat | Pukekohe Swimming club | 10 October 2020 | North Shore Invitational | Auckland, New Zealand | |
| 50m breaststroke | 26.58 | h, = | Glenn Snyders | North Shore | 3 September 2014 | New Zealand Championships | Wellington, New Zealand | |
| 50m breaststroke | 26.58 | sf, = | Glenn Snyders | North Shore | 6 December 2014 | World Championships | Doha, Qatar | |
| 100m breaststroke | 57.57 | | Joshua Gilbert | Club 37 | 23 August 2024 | New Zealand Championships | Auckland, New Zealand | |
| 200m breaststroke | 2:04.57 | | Joshua Gilbert | Club 37 | 20 August 2024 | New Zealand Championships | Auckland, New Zealand | |
| 50m butterfly | 22.60 | | Corney Swanepoel | North Shore | 11 August 2009 | Australian Championships | Hobart, Australia | |
| 100m butterfly | 50.42 | | Corney Swanepoel | North Shore | 9 August 2009 | Australian Championships | Hobart, Australia | |
| 200m butterfly | 1:51.05 | | Moss Burmester | New Zealand | 13 April 2008 | World Championships | Manchester, United Kingdom | |
| 100m individual medley | 52.73 | | Bradlee Ashby | North Shore Swimming Club | 8 October 2020 | North Shore Invitational | Auckland, New Zealand | |
| 200m individual medley | 1:53.64 | | Lewis Clareburt | New Zealand | 2 October 2026 | World Cup | Baku, Azerbaijan | |
| 400m individual medley | 4:03.02 | | Lewis Clareburt | New Zealand | 3 October 2026 | World Cup | Baku, Azerbaijan | |
| 4×50m freestyle relay | 1:25.98 | | Carter Swift (21.72); Michael Pickett (21.07); Zac Dell (21.54); Andrew Jeffcoat (21.65) | Club 37 | 10 August 2023 | New Zealand Championships | Hawke's Bay, New Zealand | |
| 4×100m freestyle relay | 3:10.97 | h | Cameron Gray (47.93); Carter Swift (46.92); Zac Dell (47.59); George Williams (48.53) | New Zealand | 13 December 2022 | World Championships | Melbourne, Australia | |
| 4×200m freestyle relay | 7:03.11 | h | Ben Littlejohn (1:44.60); Carter Swift (1:45.68); Cameron Gray (1:46.07); Louis Clark (1:46.76) | New Zealand | 16 December 2022 | World Championships | Melbourne, Australia | |
| 4×50m medley relay | 1:34.77 | | Andrew Jeffcoat (22.99); Josh Pickett (27.26); Carter Swift (23.38); Michael Pickett (21.14) | Club 37 | 11 August 2023 | New Zealand Championships | Hawke's Bay, New Zealand | |
| 4×100m medley relay | 3:26.68 | h | Zac Dell (52.19); Joshua Gilbert (57.83); Cameron Gray (50.40); Carter Swift (46.26) | New Zealand | 18 December 2022 | World Championships | Melbourne, Australia | |

Legend: # – Record awaiting ratification by Swimming New Zealand; WR – World record; OC – Oceanian record; CR – Commonwealth record; e – equalled existing record;
Records not set in finals: h – heat; sf – semifinal; r – relay 1st leg; rh – relay heat 1st leg; b – B final; † – en route to final mark; so – swim-off; tt – time trial

=== Women ===
| Event | Time | | Name | Club | Date | Meet | Location | Ref |
|---|---|---|---|---|---|---|---|---|
| 50m freestyle | 24.11 | | Chelsey Edwards | New Zealand | 10 October 2025 | World Cup | Carmel, United States | |
| 100m freestyle | 53.06 | r | Chelsey Edwards | North Shore | 21 September 2025 | New Zealand Championships | Auckland, New Zealand | |
| 200m freestyle | 1:52.66 | | Erika Fairweather | New Zealand | 18 October 2025 | World Cup | Westmont, United States | |
| 400m freestyle | 3:55.16 | | Lauren Boyle | New Zealand | 8 August 2013 | World Cup | Eindhoven, Netherlands | |
| 800m freestyle | 8:01.22 | | Lauren Boyle | New Zealand | 7 August 2013 | World Cup | Eindhoven, Netherlands | |
| 1500m freestyle | 15:22.68 | | Lauren Boyle | North Shore | 9 August 2014 | Wellington Winter Championships | Wellington, New Zealand | |
| 50m backstroke | 26.45 | | Amber George | Coast | 30 September 2026 | New Zealand Championships | Auckland, New Zealand | |
| 100m backstroke | 57.04 | rh | Helena Gasson | New Zealand | 15 December 2024 | World Championships | Budapest, Hungary | |
| 200m backstroke | 2:03.00 | | Melissa Ingram | New Zealand | 8 November 2011 | World Cup | Beijing, China | |
| 50m breaststroke | 30.27 | sf | Zoe Baker | New Zealand | 9 April 2008 | World Championships | Manchester, United Kingdom | |
| 100m breaststroke | 1:06.38 | h | Zyleika Pratt-Smith | Coast | 30 September 2026 | New Zealand Championships | Auckland, New Zealand | |
| 200m breaststroke | 2:23.15 | | Zyleika Pratt-Smith | Coast | 21 September 2025 | New Zealand Championships | Auckland, New Zealand | |
| 50m butterfly | 25.24 | sf | Helena Gasson | New Zealand | 10 December 2024 | World Championships | Budapest, Hungary | |
| 100m butterfly | 56.60 | sf | Hazel Ouwehand | New Zealand | 13 December 2024 | World Championships | Budapest, Hungary | |
| 200m butterfly | 2:07.14 | | Helena Gasson | LA Current | 16 November 2020 | International Swimming League | Budapest, Hungary | |
| 100m individual medley | 58.40 | | Helena Gasson | New Zealand | 16 December 2022 | World Championships | Melbourne, Australia | |
| 200m individual medley | 2:07.78 | | Helena Gasson | LA Current | 15 November 2020 | International Swimming League | Budapest, Hungary | |
| 400m individual medley | 4:32.48 | | Helena Gasson | LA Current | 31 October 2020 | International Swimming League | Budapest, Hungary | |
| 4×50m freestyle relay | 1:37.93 (Note: by official result source; 1:39.53 by SNZ source, a typo) | | Helena Gasson (24.82); Rebecca Moynihan (24.13); Emma Godwin (24.40); Erika Fairweather (24.58) | New Zealand | 15 December 2022 | World Championships | Melbourne, Australia | |
| 4×100m freestyle relay | 3:37.70 | | Lauren Boyle (55.16); Alison Fitch (53.94); Helen Norfolk (54.81); Hannah McLean (53.79) | New Zealand | 8 April 2006 | World Championships | Shanghai, China | |
| 4×200m freestyle relay | 7:50.73 | h | Erika Fairweather (1:54.24); Caitlin Deans (1:57.54); Summer Osborne (1:59.58); Ruby Heath (1:59.37) | New Zealand | 14 December 2022 | World Championships | Melbourne, Australia | |
| 4×50m medley relay | 1:47.83 | | Savannah-eve Martin (26.66); Zyleika Pratt-Smith (30.22); Zoe Pedersen (25.96); Amber George (24.99) | Coast | 30 September 2026 | New Zealand Championships | Auckland, New Zealand | |
| 4×100m medley relay | 3:57.02 | h | Helena Gasson (57.04); Brearna Crawford (1:07.13); Hazel Ouwehand (59.27); Zoe Pedersen (53.58) | New Zealand | 15 December 2024 | World Championships | Budapest, Hungary | |

Legend: # – Record awaiting ratification by Swimming New Zealand; WR – World record; OC – Oceanian record; CR – Commonwealth record; e – equalled existing record;
Records not set in finals: h – heat; sf – semifinal; r – relay 1st leg; rh – relay heat 1st leg; b – B final; † – en route to final mark; so – swim-off; tt – time trial

=== Mixed relay ===
| Event | Time | | Name | Club | Date | Meet | Location | Ref |
|---|---|---|---|---|---|---|---|---|
| 4×50 m freestyle relay | 1:30.38 | | Carter Swift (21.52); Cameron Gray (20.75); Rebecca Moynihan (24.10); Emma Godwin (24.01) | New Zealand | 16 December 2022 | World Championships | Melbourne, Australia | |
| 4×50 m medley relay | 1:39.53 | h | Zac Dell (24.07); Joshua Gilbert (26.11); Helena Gasson (25.39); Rebecca Moynihan (23.96) | New Zealand | 14 December 2022 | World Championships | Melbourne, Australia | |
| 4×100 m medley relay | 3:45.00 | h | Cooper Morley (51.76); Brearna Crawford (1:07.70); Ben Littlejohn (52.14); Zoe Pedersen (53.40) | New Zealand | 14 December 2024 | World Championships | Budapest, Hungary | |

Legend: # – Record awaiting ratification by Swimming New Zealand; WR – World record; OC – Oceanian record; CR – Commonwealth record; e – equalled existing record;
Records not set in finals: h – heat; so – swim-off
