= 2022 FINA World Swimming Championships (25 m) – Men's 4 × 100 metre medley relay =

Swimming competition

Men's 4 × 100-metre medley relay at the 2022 FINA World Swimming Championships (25 m)
- Venue: Melbourne Sports and Aquatic Centre
- Location: Melbourne, Australia
- Dates: 18 December (heats and finals)
- Competitors: 76 from 16 nations
- Teams: 16
- Winning time: 3:18.98 WR

Medalists
gold medal	Isaac Cooper; Joshua Yong; Matthew Temple; Kyle Chalmers; Shaun Champion	Australia
gold medal	Ryan Murphy; Nic Fink; Trenton Julian; Kieran Smith; Hunter Armstrong; Carson Foster	United States
bronze medal	Lorenzo Mora; Nicolò Martinenghi; Matteo Rivolta; Alessandro Miressi; Thomas Ceccon; Simone Cerasuolo; Alberto Razzetti; Paolo Conte Bonin	Italy

The Men's 4 × 100-metre medley relay competition of the 2022 FINA World Swimming Championships (25 m) was held on 18 December 2022.

== Records ==
Prior to the competition, the existing world and championship records were as follows.

World record	RUS	3:19.16	Saint Petersburg, Russia	20 December 2009
Competition record	ITA	3:19.76	Abu Dhabi, United Arab Emirates	21 December 2021

The following record was established during the competition:

Date	Event	Name	Nation	Time	Record
18 December	Final	Isaac Cooper (49.46); Joshua Yong (56.55); Matthew Temple (48.34); Kyle Chalmers (44.63)	Australia	3:18.98	WR
18 December	Final	Ryan Murphy (48.96); Nic Fink (54.88); Trenton Julian (49.19); Kieran Smith (45.95)	United States	3:18.98	WR

== Results ==
=== Heats ===
The heats were started at 12:29.

Rank	Heat	Lane	Nation	Swimmers	Time	Notes
1	3	4	United States	Hunter Armstrong (50.68); Nic Fink (56.71); Trenton Julian (49.12); Carson Foster (47.04)	3:23.55	Q
2	2	6	Japan	Ryosuke Irie (50.43); Ippei Watanabe (56.49); Yuya Tanaka (50.06); Katsumi Nakamura (46.70)	3:23.68	Q
3	2	4	Italy	Thomas Ceccon (49.59); Simone Cerasuolo (57.83); Alberto Razzetti (50.24); Paolo Conte Bonin (46.15)	3:23.81	Q
4	2	7	Germany	Ole Braunschweig (50.63); Lucas Matzerath (57.77); Marius Kusch (49.44); Josha Salchow (46.67)	3:24.51	Q
5	3	6	Australia	Isaac Cooper (50.42); Joshua Yong (57.38); Shaun Champion (50.32); Kyle Chalmers (46.90)	3:25.02	Q
6	3	7	Canada	Finlay Knox (50.40); James Dergousoff (58.38); Ilya Kharun (49.76); Yuri Kisil (46.79)	3:25.33	Q
7	2	2	China	Wang Gukailai (51.82); Qin Haiyang (57.61); Chen Juner (50.30); Pan Zhanle (46.28)	3:26.01	Q, NR
8	1	5	Czech Republic	Tomáš Franta (50.42); Matěj Zábojník (57.42); Jan Šefl (50.48); Daniel Gracík (47.86)	3:26.18	Q, NR
9	2	1	Spain	Hugo González (51.86); Carles Coll (58.24); Mario Mollà (50.36); Sergio de Celis (46.02)	3:26.48	NR
10	1	3	New Zealand	Zac Dell (52.19); Josh Gilbert (57.83); Cameron Gray (50.40); Carter Swift (46.26)	3:26.68	NR
11	3	3	Netherlands	Stan Pijnenburg (54.41); Caspar Corbeau (57.34 ) Nyls Korstanje (50.12); Kenzo Simons (46.74)	3:28.61	
12	2	5	Norway	Markus Lie (50.76); Christoffer Tofte Haarsaker (58.11); Jon Jøntvedt (53.58); Nicholas Lia (46.52)	3:28.97	
13	3	8	Hong Kong	Hayden Kwan (52.96); Adam Chillingworth (59.41); Ng Cheuk Yin (51.13); Ian Ho (47.23)	3:30.73	NR
14	2	8	Bulgaria	Kaloyan Levterov (55.02); Tonislav Sabev (58.42); Antani Ivanov (51.88); Deniel Nankov (47.73)	3:33.05	NR
15	3	2	Turkey	Doruk Tekin (55.10); Berkay Ömer Öğretir (57.61); Rasim Oğulcan Gör (52.14); Umitcan Gures (50.04)	3:34.89	
16	3	1	Ukraine	Oleksandr Zheltiakov (54.47); Volodymyr Lisovets (1:00.65); Andriy Govorov (54.50); Illia Linnyk (48.22)	3:37.84	
	1	4	Chinese Taipei		Did not start	
	2	3	Great Britain		Did not start	
	3	5	Brazil		Did not start	

=== Final ===
The final was held at 21:19.

Rank	Lane	Nation	Swimmers	Time	Notes
1st place, gold medalist(s)	2	Australia	Isaac Cooper (49.46); Joshua Yong (56.55); Matthew Temple (48.34); Kyle Chalmers (44.63)	3:18.98	WR
1st place, gold medalist(s)	4	United States	Ryan Murphy (48.96); Nic Fink (54.88); Trenton Julian (49.19); Kieran Smith (45.95)	3:18.98	WR
3rd place, bronze medalist(s)	3	Italy	Lorenzo Mora (49.48); Nicolò Martinenghi (55.52); Matteo Rivolta (48.50); Alessandro Miressi (45.56)	3:19.06	ER
4	5	Japan	Ryosuke Irie (49.98); Yuya Hinomoto (56.27); Yuya Sakamoto (50.06); Katsuhiro Matsumoto (46.39)	3:22.70	
5	6	Germany	Ole Braunschweig (50.68); Lucas Matzerath (56.96); Marius Kusch (48.72); Josha Salchow (46.68)	3:23.04	
6	7	Canada	Finlay Knox (50.46); Javier Acevedo (57.21); Ilya Kharun (49.54); Ruslan Gaziev (46.23)	3:23.44	
7	1	China	Wang Gukailai (51.54); Qin Haiyang (57.36); Chen Juner (50.16); Pan Zhanle (46.09)	3:25.15	NR
8	8	Czech Republic	Tomáš Franta (50.48); Matěj Zábojník (57.49); Jan Šefl (50.78); Daniel Gracík (47.62)	3:26.37	
