= 2022 FINA World Swimming Championships (25 m) – Mixed 4 × 50 metre freestyle relay =

Swimming competition

Mixed 4 × 50 metre freestyle relay at the 2022 FINA World Swimming Championships (25 m)
- Venue: Melbourne Sports and Aquatic Centre
- Location: Melbourne, Australia
- Dates: 16 December (heats and finals)
- Competitors: 119 from 27 nations
- Teams: 27
- Winning time: 1:27.33 WR

Medalists
gold medal	Maxime Grousset; Florent Manaudou; Béryl Gastaldello; Mélanie Henique; Mary-Ambre Moluh	France
silver medal	Kyle Chalmers; Matthew Temple; Meg Harris; Emma McKeon; Flynn Southam; Madison Wilson	Australia
bronze medal	Kenzo Simons; Thom de Boer; Maaike de Waard; Marrit Steenbergen; Stan Pijnenburg; Nyls Korstanje	Netherlands

The Mixed 4 × 50 metre freestyle relay competition of the 2022 FINA World Swimming Championships (25 m) was held on 16 December 2022.

== Records ==
Prior to the competition, the existing world and championship records were as follows.

World record	United States (USA)	1:27.89	Hangzhou, China	12 December 2018
Competition record	United States (USA)	1:27.89	Hangzhou, China	12 December 2018

The following new records were set during this competition:

Date	Event	Name	Nation	Time	Record
16 December	Final	Maxime Grousset (20.92); Florent Manaudou (20.26); Béryl Gastaldello (23.00); Mélanie Henique (23.15)	France	1:27.33	WR

== Results ==
=== Heats ===
The heats were started at 11:05.

Rank	Heat	Lane	Nation	Swimmers	Time	Notes
1	3	5	France	Florent Manaudou (21.10); Maxime Grousset (20.76); Mélanie Henique (23.86); Mary-Ambre Moluh (23.97)	1:29.69	Q
2	1	2	Australia	Flynn Southam (22.04); Matthew Temple (20.97); Madison Wilson (23.83); Emma McKeon (22.98)	1:29.82	Q
3	3	4	Netherlands	Stan Pijnenburg (21.71); Nyls Korstanje (20.96); Maaike de Waard (23.61); Marrit Steenbergen (23.67)	1:29.95	Q
4	2	4	United States	Shaine Casas (21.37); Hunter Armstrong (20.81); Natalie Hinds (24.06); Alexandra Walsh (23.73)	1:29.97	Q
5	3	7	China	Pan Zhanle (21.53); Wang Haoyu (21.14); Wang Yichun (24.36); Liu Shuhan (24.18)	1:31.21	Q
6	1	7	New Zealand	Carter Swift (21.65); Zac Dell (21.32); Rebecca Moynihan (23.96); Emma Godwin (24.46)	1:31.39	Q, NR
7	1	6	Japan	Masahiro Kawane (21.57); Takeshi Kawamoto (21.28); Chichiro Igarashi (24.10); Miki Takahashi (24.54)	1:31.49	Q
8	2	8	Brazil	Lucas Peixoto (21.73); Pedro Spajari (21.40); Stephanie Balduccini (24.33); Giovanna Diamante (24.69)	1:32.15	Q
9	2	5	Sweden	Oskar Hoff (22.46); Isak Eliasson (20.79); Sofia Åstedt (24.28); Klara Thormalm (24.81)	1:32.34	
10	3	3	Slovakia	Matej Duša (21.58); Ádám Halás (21.89); Teresa Ivanová (24.26); Lillian Slušná (24.65)	1:32.38	NR
11	2	3	South Africa	Clayton Jimmie (21.83); Simon Haddon (21.84); Caitlin de Lange (24.29); Milla Drakopoulos (25.32)	1:33.28	
12	4	8	Chinese Taipei	Wang Kuan-hung (22.47); Wu Chun-feng (21.77); Chen Szu-an (25.77); Huang Mei-chien (24.86)	1:34.87	
13	4	3	Hong Kong	Ng Cheuk Yin (22.48); Hayden Kwan (22.36); Sze Hang Yu (24.80); Ho Nam Wai (25.34)	1:34.98	
14	1	5	Colombia	Santiago Corredor (22.99); Jorge Murillo (22.78); Stefanía Gómez (25.06); Sirena Rowe (24.24)	1:35.07	NR
15	2	1	Peru	Javier Matta (22.05); Joaquín Vargas (22.91); Rafaela Fernandini (24.99); McKenna DeBever (25.46)	1:35.41	NR
16	4	6	Bahamas	Lamar Taylor (21.65); Luke Thompson (23.30); Rhaniska Gibbs (25.70); Victoria Russell (26.30)	1:36.95	
17	3	6	Dominican Republic	Josué Domínguez (22.95); Elizabeth Jiménez (26.47); Krystal Lara (25.35); Denzel González (22.48)	1:37.25	NR
18	3	1	Macau	Chao Man Hou (22.60); Lin Sizhuang (22.97); Cheang Weng Lam (26.64); Chen Pui Lam (26.70)	1:38.91	
19	3	8	Samoa	Kokoro Frost (24.02); Brandon Schuster (23.02); Kaiya Brown (27.06); Olivia Borg (25.39)	1:39.49	
20	2	6	Mongolia	Batbayaryn Enkhtamir (23.54); Myagmaryn Delgerkhüü (23.81); Batbayaryn Enkhkhüslen (25.83); Enkh-Amgalangiin Ariuntamir (27.28)	1:40.46	
21	3	2	Guam	James Hendrix (24.10); Mia Lee (27.12); Amaya Bollinger (28.97); Israel Poppe (23.67)	1:43.86	
22	2	7	Tanzania	Sophia Latiff (27.88); Hilal Hilal (24.72); Ria Save (28.49); Collins Saliboko (23.34)	1:44.43	
23	1	3	Papua New Guinea	Josh Tarere (24.36); Nathaniel Noka (24.88); Jhnayali Tokome-Garap (28.74); Georgia-Leigh Vele (27.48)	1:45.46	
24	4	2	Northern Mariana Islands	Isaiah Alexsenko (23.31); Jinnosuke Suzuki (25.20); Maria Batallones (28.32); Shoko Litulumar (29.96)	1:46.79	
25	4	1	Federated States of Micronesia	Tasi Limtiaco (24.21); Taeyanna Adams (29.11); Kestra Kihleng (29.19); Kyler Kihleng (26.02)	1:48.53	
26	2	2	Maldives	Mubal Azzam Ibrahim (26.14); Aishath Sausan (29.92); Hamna Ahmed (30.88); Mohamed Rihan Shiham (25.98)	1:52.92	
27	1	4	Palau	Ungilreng Ruluked (32.35); Galyah Mikel (31.30); Travis Sakurai (25.56); Shawn Dingilius-Wallace (26.72)	1:55.93	
	4	4	Canada		Did not start	
	4	5	Italy		Did not start	
	4	7	Philippines		Did not start	

=== Final ===
The final was held at 19:35.

Rank	Lane	Nation	Swimmers	Time	Notes
1st place, gold medalist(s)	4	France	Maxime Grousset (20.92); Florent Manaudou (20.26); Béryl Gastaldello (23.00); Mélanie Henique (23.15)	1:27.33	WR
2nd place, silver medalist(s)	5	Australia	Kyle Chalmers (20.97); Matthew Temple (20.71); Meg Harris (23.73); Emma McKeon (22.62)	1:28.03	OC
3rd place, bronze medalist(s)	3	Netherlands	Kenzo Simons (21.14); Thom de Boer (20.61); Maaike de Waard (23.35); Marrit Steenbergen (23.43)	1:28.53	
4	6	United States	Michael Andrew (20.81); David Curtiss (20.89); Erika Brown (23.53); Alexandra Walsh (23.95)	1:29.18	
5	1	Japan	Kosuke Matsui (21.24); Masahiro Kawane (20.81); Chichiro Igarashi (24.02); Ai Soma (23.98)	1:30.05	
6	2	China	Pan Zhanle (21.49); Wang Haoyu (20.89); Wang Yichun (23.98); Liu Shuhan (23.82)	1:30.18	NR
7	7	New Zealand	Carter Swift (21.52); Cameron Gray (20.75); Rebecca Moynihan (24.10); Emma Godwin (24.01)	1:30.38	NR
8	8	Brazil	Lucas Peixoto (21.85); Pedro Spajari (21.17); Stephanie Balduccini (24.83); Giovanna Diamante (24.32)	1:32.17	
