= Swimming at the 2023 World Aquatics Championships – Men's 4 × 100 metre medley relay =

Men's 4 × 100 metre medley relay at the 2023 World Aquatics Championships
- Venue: Marine Messe Fukuoka
- Location: Fukuoka, Japan
- Dates: 30 July (heats and final)
- Competitors: 109 from 24 nations
- Teams: 24
- Winning time: 3:27.20 CR

Medalists
gold medal	Ryan Murphy; Nic Fink; Dare Rose; Jack Alexy; Hunter Armstrong; Josh Matheny; Thomas Heilman; Matt King	United States
silver medal	Xu Jiayu; Qin Haiyang; Wang Changhao; Pan Zhanle; Yan Zibei; Sun Jiajun; Wang Haoyu	China
bronze medal	Bradley Woodward; Zac Stubblety-Cook; Matthew Temple; Kyle Chalmers; Samuel Williamson; Kai Taylor	Australia

The men's 4 × 100 metre medley relay competition at the 2023 World Aquatics Championships was held on 30 July 2023.

== Records ==
Prior to the competition, the existing world and championship records were as follows:

World record	United States; Ryan Murphy (52.31); Michael Andrew (58.49); Caeleb Dressel (49.03); Zach Apple (46.95)	3:26.78	Tokyo, Japan	1 August 2021
Competition record	United States; Aaron Peirsol (52.19); Eric Shanteau (58.57); Michael Phelps (49.72); David Walters (46.80)	3:27.28	Rome, Italy	2 August 2009

The following new records were set during this competition.

Date	Event	Nation	Swimmers	Time	Record
30 July	Final	United States	Ryan Murphy (52.04); Nic Fink (58.03); Dare Rose (50.13); Jack Alexy (47.00)	3:27.20	CR

== Results ==
=== Heats ===
The heats were held at 10:58.

Rank	Heat	Lane	Nation	Swimmers	Time	Notes
1	2	4	United States	Hunter Armstrong (52.45); Josh Matheny (59.12); Thomas Heilman (51.61); Matt King (47.33)	3:30.51	Q
2	3	3	France	Mewen Tomac (53.40); Léon Marchand (59.57); Maxime Grousset (50.47); Hadrien Salvan (48.17)	3:31.61	Q
3	2	5	Australia	Bradley Woodward (53.64); Samuel Williamson (59.60); Matthew Temple (50.82); Kai Taylor (47.69)	3:31.75	Q
4	2	6	China	Xu Jiayu (53.16); Yan Zibei (59.04); Sun Jiajun (52.35); Wang Haoyu (47.34)	3:31.89	Q
5	2	3	Germany	Ole Braunschweig (53.96); Lucas Matzerath (58.87); Jan Eric Friese (51.29); Josha Salchow (47.99)	3:32.11	Q
5	2	7	Canada	Javier Acevedo (54.35); James Dergousoff (1:00.10); Joshua Liendo (50.02); Ruslan Gaziev (47.64)	3:32.11	Q
7	2	2	Japan	Ryosuke Irie (54.00); Ippei Watanabe (59.58); Naoki Mizunuma (51.34); Katsuhiro Matsumoto (47.44)	3:32.36	Q
8	3	5	Great Britain	Oliver Morgan (53.74); James Wilby (59.81); James Guy (51.36); Tom Dean (48.36)	3:33.27	Q
9	3	4	Italy	Thomas Ceccon (53.67); Nicolò Martinenghi (59.65); Piero Codia (51.81); Manuel Frigo (48.41)	3:33.54	
10	2	1	South Korea	Lee Ju-ho (54.51); Choi Dong-yeol (59.45); Kim Young-beom (52.06); Hwang Sun-woo (48.23)	3:34.25	NR
11	3	6	Austria	Bernhard Reitshammer (54.72); Valentin Bayer (59.68); Simon Bucher (51.87); Heiko Gigler (48.31)	3:34.58	
12	3	2	Poland	Ksawery Masiuk (54.55); Dawid Wiekiera (1:00.53); Adrian Jaskiewicz (51.84); Kamil Sieradzki (47.74)	3:34.66	
13	1	4	Ireland	Conor Ferguson (54.14); Darragh Greene (1:00.03); Max McCusker (52.27); Shane Ryan (48.59)	3:35.03	
14	3	1	Spain	Hugo González (53.64); Carles Coll (1:00.45); Mario Mollà (51.78); César Castro (49.26)	3:35.13	
15	1	5	Switzerland	Roman Mityukov (54.47); Jérémy Desplanches (1:00.96); Noè Ponti (51.33); Antonio Djakovic (48.70)	3:35.46	NR
16	1	6	Portugal	João Costa (54.13); Gabriel Lopes (1:00.57); Diogo Ribeiro (51.76); Miguel Nascimento (49.17)	3:35.63	NR
17	2	9	Israel	Michael Laitarovsky (54.72); Ron Polonsky (1:00.36); Gal Cohen Groumi (51.80); Tomer Frankel (49.59)	3:36.47	
18	1	3	Mexico	Diego Camacho (56.03); Miguel de Lara (1:00.87); Jorge Iga (52.65); Andres Dupont (47.70)	3:37.25	NR
19	2	0	Sweden	Björn Seeliger (56.38); Erik Persson (1:00.26); Oskar Hoff (53.96); Robin Hanson (48.97)	3:39.57	
20	3	8	Greece	Apostolos Siskos (56.65); Arkadios Aspougalis (1:01.64); Andreas Vazaios (53.75); Kristian Gkolomeev (49.98)	3:42.02	
21	3	9	Thailand	Tonnam Kanteemool (58.20); Dulyawat Kaewsriyong (1:07.13); Navaphat Wongcharoen (54.90); Ratthawit Thammananthachote (52.30)	3:52.53	
22	3	0	Vietnam	Mai Trần Tuấn Anh (1:00.62); Phạm Thanh Bảo (1:04.92); Hồ Nguyễn Duy Khoa (58.64); Luong Jérémie Loïc Nino (52.00)	3:56.18	
	1	2	New Zealand	Andrew Jeffcoat (54.37); Joshua Gilbert (1:00.91); Lewis Clareburt (52.47); Cameron Gray	DSQ	
	3	7	Brazil	Guilherme Basseto (54.18); João Gomes Júnior (1:00.08); Kayky Mota; Marcelo Chierighini	DSQ	
	2	8	Singapore	DNS		

=== Final ===
The final was held at 21:19.

Rank	Lane	Nation	Swimmers	Time	Notes
1st place, gold medalist(s)	4	United States	Ryan Murphy (52.04); Nic Fink (58.03); Dare Rose (50.13); Jack Alexy (47.00)	3:27.20	CR
2nd place, silver medalist(s)	6	China	Xu Jiayu (53.39); Qin Haiyang (57.43); Wang Changhao (51.56); Pan Zhanle (46.62)	3:29.00	AS
3rd place, bronze medalist(s)	3	Australia	Bradley Woodward (53.38); Zac Stubblety-Cook (59.25); Matthew Temple (50.10); Kyle Chalmers (46.89)	3:29.62	
4	5	France	Yohann Ndoye-Brouard (53.21); Léon Marchand (59.00); Maxime Grousset (49.27); Hadrien Salvan (48.40)	3:29.88	
5	8	Great Britain	Oliver Morgan (53.25); James Wilby (58.48); Jacob Peters (51.50); Matt Richards (46.93)	3:30.16	
6	1	Japan	Ryosuke Irie (53.71); Ippei Watanabe (59.41); Naoki Mizunuma (51.26); Katsuhiro Matsumoto (48.20)	3:32.58	
7	7	Canada	Javier Acevedo (54.35); James Dergousoff (1:00.03); Joshua Liendo (50.66); Ruslan Gaziev (47.57)	3:32.61	
8	2	Germany	Ole Braunschweig (54.16); Lucas Matzerath (58.70); Jan Eric Friese (52.16); Josha Salchow (47.89)	3:32.91	
