= Swimming at the 2023 World Aquatics Championships – Mixed 4 × 100 metre medley relay =

Mixed 4 × 100 metre medley relay at the 2023 World Aquatics Championships
- Venue: Marine Messe Fukuoka
- Location: Fukuoka, Japan
- Dates: 26 July (heats and final)
- Competitors: 184 from 43 nations
- Teams: 43
- Winning time: 3:38.57

Medalists
gold medal	Xu Jiayu; Qin Haiyang; Zhang Yufei; Cheng Yujie; Yan Zibei; Wang Yichun; Wu Qingfeng	China
silver medal	Kaylee McKeown; Zac Stubblety-Cook; Matthew Temple; Shayna Jack; Bradley Woodward; Samuel Williamson; Emma McKeon	Australia
bronze medal	Ryan Murphy; Nic Fink; Torri Huske; Kate Douglass; Katharine Berkoff; Josh Matheny; Dare Rose; Abbey Weitzeil	United States

The mixed 4 × 100 metre medley relay competition at the 2023 World Aquatics Championships was held on 26 July 2023.

== Records ==
Prior to the competition, the existing world and championship records were as follows.

World record	Great Britain	3:37.58	Tokyo, Japan	31 July 2021
Competition record	United States	3:38.56	Budapest, Hungary	26 July 2017

== Results ==
=== Heats ===
The heats were held at 11:56.

Rank	Heat	Lane	Nation	Swimmers	Time	Notes
1	5	4	United States	Katharine Berkoff (59.12); Josh Matheny (58.45); Dare Rose (50.50); Abbey Weitzeil (52.40)	3:40.47	Q
2	4	4	Australia	Bradley Woodward (53.63); Samuel Williamson (58.88); Emma McKeon (56.70); Shayna Jack (51.66)	3:40.87	Q
3	5	5	Netherlands	Maaike de Waard (1:00.07); Arno Kamminga (58.72); Nyls Korstanje (50.53); Marrit Steenbergen (52.13)	3:41.45	Q
4	4	3	China	Xu Jiayu (52.68); Yan Zibei (59.00); Wang Yichun (57.46); Wu Qingfeng (53.35)	3:42.49	Q
5	4	5	Great Britain	Medi Harris (59.71); James Wilby (59.34); Jacob Peters (51.03); Anna Hopkin (53.39)	3:43.47	Q
6	5	6	Canada	Ingrid Wilm (59.68); James Dergousoff (1:00.24); Margaret MacNeil (56.74); Ruslan Gaziev (47.66)	3:44.32	Q
7	4	6	Japan	Ryosuke Irie (53.63); Ippei Watanabe (59.48); Ai Soma (57.73); Rikako Ikee (53.95)	3:44.79	Q
8	4	2	Germany	Ole Braunschweig (53.66); Lucas Matzerath (58.97); Angelina Köhler (56.65); Lisa-Marie Finger (56.06)	3:45.34	Q
9	4	8	Sweden	Hanna Rosvall (1:00.37); Erik Persson (1:00.12); Louise Hansson (57.05); Björn Seeliger (48.31)	3:45.85	
10	5	7	France	Pauline Mahieu (1:00.45); Clement Bidard (1:00.11); Stanislas Huille (51.69); Beryl Gastaldello (52.82)	3:46.07	
11	5	3	Italy	Lorenzo Mora (54.69); Federico Poggio (58.87); Ilaria Bianchi (58.39); Costanza Cocconcelli (54.13)	3:46.08	
12	5	2	Poland	Ksawery Masiuk (53.88); Dominika Sztandera (1:06.61); Adrian Jaskiewicz (51.35); Kornelia Fiedkiewicz (54.45)	3:46.29	
13	3	5	South Korea	Lee Eun-ji (1:00.41); Choi Dong-yeol (59.50); Kim Young-beom (52.25); Hur Yeon-kyung (54.93)	3:47.09	
14	4	7	Greece	Apostolos Christou (52.99); Arkadios Aspougalis (1:01.30); Anna Ntountounaki (57.40); Maria Drasidou (55.88)	3:47.57	
15	4	1	Israel	Anastasia Gorbenko (1:00.13); Ron Polonsky (1:00.17); Tomer Frankel (52.15); Daria Golovaty (55.31)	3:47.76	
16	5	1	Brazil	Guilherme Basseto (54.28); Jhennifer Conceição (1:08.07); Kayky Mota (51.51); Stephanie Balduccini (54.14)	3:48.00	
17	3	3	New Zealand	Helena Gasson (1:00.68); Josh Gilbert (1:01.03); Vanessa Ouwehand (59.07); Carter Swift (48.48)	3:49.26	
18	1	4	Mexico	Miranda Grana (1:03.11); Miguel de Lara (1:00.94); Athena Meneses (1:00.75); Andres Dupont (48.58)	3:53.38	
19	5	9	Estonia	Armin Evert Lelle (57.16); Eneli Jefimova (1:06.83); Daniel Zaitsev (52.61); Aleksa Gold (56.90)	3:53.50	
20	1	2	Belgium	Stan Franckx (56.25); Florine Gaspard (1:08.80); Valentine Dumont (59.67); Lucas Henveaux (49.34)	3:54.06	
21	4	0	Hungary	Áron Székely (55.96); Dalma Sebestyén (1:09.75); Lora Komoróczy (1:00.86); Dániel Mészáros (50.25)	3:56.82	
22	5	0	Colombia	Santiago Corredor (57.59); Jorge Murillo (1:01.41); Karen Durango (1:01.89); Sirena Rowe (56.58)	3:57.47	
23	3	4	Slovakia	Teresa Ivan (1:03.44); František Jablčník (1:06.21); Andrea Podmaníková (1:02.11); Matej Duša (49.93)	4:01.69	
24	3	7	Bahamas	Lamar Taylor (55.03); Rhanishka Gibbs (1:15.42); Davante Carey (54.80); Zaylie Thompson (58.73)	4:03.98	
25	3	6	Peru	Alexia Sotomayor (1:05.21); McKenna DeBever (1:14.36); Diego Balbi (54.18); Joaquín Vargas (51.25)	4:05.00	
26	4	9	Thailand	Saovanee Boonamphai (1:06.29); Dulyawat Kaewsriyong (1:05.50); Navaphat Wongcharoen (54.85); Kamonchanok Kwanmuang (58.49)	4:05.03	
27	1	7	Panama	Carolina Cermelli (1:04.75); Emily Santos (1:10.68); Jeancarlo Calderon Harper (56.95); Tyler Christianson (54.70)	4:07.08	
28	2	1	Armenia	Artur Barseghyan (1:02.72); Ashot Chakhoyan (1:05.45); Varsenik Manucharyan (1:03.02); Ani Poghosyan (58.64)	4:09.83	NR
29	1	6	Mongolia	Ariuntamir Enkh-Amgalan (1:08.41); Batbayar Enkhtamir (1:06.87); Enkhtur Erkhes (58.15); Batbayar Enkhkhuslen (57.02)	4:10.45	NR
30	3	1	Suspended Member Federation	Swaleh Abubakar Talib (1:06.03); Maria Brunlehner (1:13.83); Emily Muteti (1:02.71); Monyo Maina (52.79)	4:15.36	
31	3	8	Uganda	Adnan Kabuye (1:03.60); Tendo Mukalazi (1:07.40); Tara Naluwoza (1:09.31); Kirabo Namutebi (59.39)	4:19.70	
32	3	0	Angola	Salvador Gordo (1:01.31); Maria Lopes Freitas (1:20.21); Lia Ana Lima (1:07.36); Henrique Mascarenhas (52.27)	4:21.15	
33	2	2	Bahrain	Asma Lefahler (1:13.55); Abdulla Khalid Jamal (1:06.11); Ali Sadeq Alawi (1:00.75); Ayah Binrajab (1:03.99)	4:24.40	
34	2	7	Nigeria	Clinton Opute (1:07.38); Adaku Nwandu (1:23.16); Dorcas Abeng (57.10); Colins Obi Ebingha (1:01.26)	4:28.90	
35	3	9	Northern Mariana Islands	Isaiah Aleksenko (58.58); Maria Batallones (1:21.15); Anthony Deleon (1:03.42); Shoko Litulumar (1:08.78)	4:31.93	
36	2	9	Papua New Guinea	Abigail Ai Tom (1:15.56); Georgia-Leigh Vele (1:17.41); Nathaniel Noka (1:03.88); Josh Tarere (55.46)	4:32.31	
37	2	8	Federated States of Micronesia	Kyler Anthony Kihleng (1:12.03); Tasi Limtiaco (1:04.17); Kestra Kihleng (1:14.09); Taeyanna Adams (1:06.67)	4:36.96	
38	2	0	Cape Verde	La Troya Pina (1:16.55); Jayla Pina (1:14.28); Troy Pina (1:06.82); Ailton Lima (59.46)	4:37.11	
39	2	3	Tanzania	Ria Save (1:16.14); Hilal Hemed Hilal (1:15.91); Collins Saliboko (58.97); Sophia Latiff (1:06.33)	4:37.35	
40	1	3	Tonga	Kapeli Siua (1:10.09); Noelani Day (1:25.13); Finau Ohuafi (1:00.29); Charissa Panuve (1:03.91)	4:39.42	
41	2	4	Guam	Israel Poppe (1:03.93); Amaya Bollinger (1:38.00); James Hendrix (57.58); Mia Lee (1:01.17)	4:40.68	NR
42	2	5	Maldives	Ali Imaan (1:05.47); Hamna Ahmed (1:31.10); Mohamed Rihan Shiham (1:03.93); Meral Ayn Latheef (1:10.14)	4:50.64	
	1	5	Antigua and Barbuda	Did not start		
	3	2	Spain	Did not start		
	5	8	Singapore	Did not start		
	2	6	Malawi	Ammara Pinto (1:19.09); Filipe Gomes; Muhammad Ali Moosa; Tayamika Chang'Anamuno	Disqualified	

=== Final ===
The final was held at 21:48.

Rank	Lane	Nation	Swimmers	Time	Notes
1st place, gold medalist(s)	6	China	Xu Jiayu (52.42); Qin Haiyang (57.31); Zhang Yufei (55.69); Cheng Yujie (53.15)	3:38.57	
2nd place, silver medalist(s)	5	Australia	Kaylee McKeown (58.03); Zac Stubblety-Cook (58.84); Matthew Temple (50.63); Shayna Jack (51.53)	3:39.03	
3rd place, bronze medalist(s)	4	United States	Ryan Murphy (52.02); Nic Fink (58.19); Torri Huske (58.19); Kate Douglass (51.79)	3:40.19	
4	3	Netherlands	Maaike de Waard (1:00.05); Arno Kamminga (59.00); Nyls Korstanje (50.67); Marrit Steenbergen (52.09)	3:41.81	
5	2	Great Britain	Medi Harris (59.76); James Wilby (59.47); Jacob Peters (51.11); Anna Hopkin (52.86)	3:43.20	
6	7	Canada	Kylie Masse (59.19); James Dergousoff (1:00.69); Margaret MacNeil (56.30); Ruslan Gaziev (47.54)	3:43.72	
7	1	Japan	Ryosuke Irie (53.42); Ippei Watanabe (59.60); Ai Soma (58.40); Rikako Ikee (53.91)	3:45.33	
8	8	Germany	Ole Braunschweig (54.00); Lucas Matzerath (59.97); Angelina Köhler (56.74); Nele Schulze (54.91)	3:45.62	
