= Swimming at the 2022 Commonwealth Games – Women's 50 metre butterfly =

Women's 50 metre butterfly at the 2022 Commonwealth Games
- Venue: Sandwell Aquatics Centre
- Dates: 31 July (heats, semifinals); 1 August (final)
- Competitors: 53 from 35 nations
- Winning time: 25.90

Medalists
gold medal	Emma McKeon	Australia
silver medal	Erin Gallagher	South Africa
silver medal	Holly Barratt	Australia

The women's 50 metre butterfly event at the 2022 Commonwealth Games will be held on 30 July and 1 August at the Sandwell Aquatics Centre.

== Records ==
Prior to this competition, the existing world, Commonwealth and Games records were as follows:

World record	Sarah Sjöström (SWE)	24.43	Borås, Sweden	5 July 2014
Commonwealth record	Fran Halsall (ENG)	25.20	Glasgow, United Kingdom	27 July 2014
Games record	Fran Halsall (ENG)	25.20	Glasgow, United Kingdom	27 July 2014

== Schedule ==
The schedule is as follows:

All times are British Summer Time (UTC+1)

Date	Time	Round
Sunday 31 July 2022	11:03	Qualifying
Sunday 31 July 2022	19:17	Semifinals
Monday 1 August 2022	20:43	Final

== Results ==
=== Heats ===
Rank	Heat	Lane	Name	Nationality	Time	Notes
1	5	4	Maggie Mac Neil	Canada	26.24	Q
2	7	6	Helena Gasson	New Zealand	26.52	Q
3	7	5	Katerine Savard	Canada	26.57	Q
4	6	4	Emma McKeon	Australia	26.65	Q
5	5	5	Harriet Jones	Wales	26.68	Q
6	6	5	Alex Perkins	Australia	26.73	Q
7	7	4	Holly Barratt	Australia	26.86	Q
8	6	2	Quah Jing Wen	Singapore	26.88	Q
9	5	6	Danielle Hill	Northern Ireland	26.92	Q
10	7	3	Erin Gallagher	South Africa	26.96	Q
11	5	3	Quah Ting Wen	Singapore	27.16	Q
11	5	7	Rebecca Meder	South Africa	27.16	Q
13	7	2	Keanna Macinnes	Scotland	27.18	Q
14	5	2	Maddy Moore	Bermuda	27.33	Q
15	6	3	Vanessa Ouwehand	New Zealand	27.38	Q
16	6	7	Olivia Borg	Samoa	27.42	Q
17	6	6	Alys Thomas	Wales	27.52	R
18	7	7	Tain Bruce	Scotland	27.56	R
19	7	1	Emma Harvey	Bermuda	27.78	
20	6	8	Trinity Hearne	South Africa	27.83	
21	5	1	Zaneta Alvaranga	Jamaica	27.89	
22	4	1	Imara Thorpe	Kenya	27.92	
23	7	8	Kaitlyn McCaw	Northern Ireland	28.07	
24	6	1	Mackenzie Headley	Jamaica	28.12	
25	4	5	Orla Rabey	Guernsey	28.45	
26	4	7	Mikaili Charlemagne	Saint Lucia	28.48	
27	4	3	Gemma Atherley	Jersey	28.51	
28	4	4	Norah Milanesi	Cameroon	28.53	
29	4	8	Lanihei Connolly	Cook Islands	28.84	
30	2	4	Lily Scott	Jersey	29.05	
31	3	3	Jade Phiri	Zambia	29.15	
32	3	4	Molly Staples	Guernsey	29.29	
33	3	6	Bisma Khan	Pakistan	29.43	
34	3	5	Katelyn Cabral	Bahamas	29.56	
35	2	8	Rosemarie Rova	Fiji	29.90	
36	3	1	Nubia Adjei	Ghana	30.16	
37	2	6	Abigail Deshong	Saint Vincent and the Grenadines	30.20	
38	2	2	Aleka Persaud	Guyana	30.23	
39	2	3	Georgia-Leigh Vele	Papua New Guinea	30.34	
40	2	1	Tilly Collymore	Grenada	30.38	
41	1	4	Jamie Joachim	Saint Vincent and the Grenadines	30.90	
42	3	2	Mst Sonia Khatun	Bangladesh	30.94	
43	3	7	Aaliyah Palestrini	Seychelles	31.24	
44	2	7	Alicia Mateus	Mozambique	31.28	
45	2	5	Hayley Hoy	Eswatini	31.32	
46	3	8	Mishael Aisha Hyat Ayub	Pakistan	31.44	
47	1	5	Arleigha Hall	Turks and Caicos Islands	32.12	
48	1	3	Charissa Panuve	Tonga	32.56	
49	1	7	Aishath Sausan	Maldives	32.94	
50	1	2	Hamna Ahmed	Maldives	34.16	
51	1	1	Tity Dumbuya	Sierra Leone	34.17	
52	1	6	Jessica Makwenda	Malawi	34.75	
	4	2	Laura le Cras	Guernsey	DSQ	
	4	6	Kelsie Campbell	Jamaica	DNS	
	5	8	Grace Davison	Northern Ireland	DNS	

=== Semifinals ===
Rank	Heat	Lane	Name	Nationality	Time	Notes
1	1	5	Emma McKeon	Australia	26.02	Q
2	1	2	Erin Gallagher	South Africa	26.17	Q, NR
3	2	4	Maggie Mac Neil	Canada	26.19	Q
4	2	6	Holly Barratt	Australia	26.28	Q
5	1	3	Alex Perkins	Australia	26.29	Q
6	1	4	Helena Gasson	New Zealand	26.36	Q
7	2	3	Harriet Jones	Wales	26.39	Q
8	2	5	Katerine Savard	Canada	26.42	Q
9	2	2	Danielle Hill	Northern Ireland	26.65	R
10	1	6	Quah Jing Wen	Singapore	26.88	R
11	1	7	Rebecca Meder	South Africa	26.84	
12	2	1	Keanna Macinnes	Scotland	26.98	
13	2	7	Quah Ting Wen	Singapore	27.00	
14	2	8	Vanessa Ouwehand	New Zealand	27.01	
15	1	8	Olivia Borg	Samoa	27.37	
16	1	1	Maddy Moore	Bermuda	27.42	

=== Final ===
Rank	Lane	Name	Nationality	Time	Notes
1st place, gold medalist(s)	4	Emma McKeon	Australia	25.90	
2nd place, silver medalist(s)	5	Erin Gallagher	South Africa	26.05	NR
2nd place, silver medalist(s)	6	Holly Barratt	Australia	26.05	
4	3	Maggie Mac Neil	Canada	26.17	
5	2	Alex Perkins	Australia	26.19	
6	1	Harriet Jones	Wales	26.20	
7	7	Helena Gasson	New Zealand	26.24	NR
8	8	Katerine Savard	Canada	26.43	
