= Bahamas at the 2022 Commonwealth Games =

- Flag of the Bahamas
- CG code: BAH
- CGA: Bahamas Olympic Committee
- Website: bahamasolympiccommittee.org

in Birmingham, England 28 July 2022 – 8 August 2022
- Competitors: 28 (20 men and 8 women) in 7 sports
- Flag bearers: Izaak Bastian; Lilly Higgs
- Medals Ranked =23rd: Gold 1 Silver 1 Bronze 0 Total 2

Commonwealth Games appearances (overview)
- 1954; 1958; 1962; 1966; 1970; 1974; 1978; 1982; 1986; 1990; 1994; 1998; 2002; 2006; 2010; 2014; 2018; 2022; 2026; 2030

The Bahamas competed at the 2022 Commonwealth Games in Birmingham, England between 28 July and 8 August 2022. It was the team's sixteenth appearance at the Games.

In June 2022, a team of 28 athletes was announced. Swimmers Izaak Bastian and Lilly Higgs were the country's flagbearers during the opening ceremony.

== Medalists ==
Medal	Name	Sport	Event	Date
Gold	LaQuan Nairn	Athletics	Men's long jump	4 August
Silver	Devynne Charlton	Athletics	Women's 100m Hurdles	7 August

== Competitors ==
The Bahamas will send a contingent of 28 competitors to the Games.

The following is the list of number of competitors participating at the Games per sport/discipline.

Sport	Men	Women	Total
Athletics	8	3	11
Boxing	2	0	2
Cycling	2	0	2
Judo	1	1	2
Swimming	4	4	8
Triathlon	1	0	1
Wrestling	2	0	2
Total	20	8	28

== Athletics ==
As of 14 June 2022, a squad of eleven athletes – including Tokyo 2020 champion Steven Gardiner – will take part in the competition.

Men
Track and road events

Athlete	Event	Heat		Semifinal		Final	
Athlete	Event	Result	Rank	Result	Rank	Result	Rank
Terrence Jones	100 m	DNS		Did not advance			
Alonzo Russell	400 m	46.41	3 Q	46.40	4	Did not advance	
Jahmaal Wilson	110 m hurdles	DSQ		—N/a		Did not advance	

Field events

Athlete	Event	Qualification		Final	
Athlete	Event	Distance	Rank	Distance	Rank
Shaun Miller	High jump	—N/a		2.10	10
Donald Thomas	High jump	—N/a		2.22	4
LaQuan Nairn	Long jump	7.90	2 q	8.08	1st place, gold medalist(s)
Kaiwan Culmer	Triple jump	—N/a		16.04	7

Combined events – Decathlon

Athlete	Event	100 m	LJ	SP	HJ	400 m	110H	DT	PV	JT	1500 m	Final	Rank
Kendrick Thompson	Result	11.18	7.43	11.63	1.94	50.07	14.72	38.35	4.20	50.66	DNS	DNF	
Kendrick Thompson	Points	821	918	584	749	811	884	631	673	598	DNS	DNF	

Women
Track and road events

Athlete	Event	Heat		Semifinal		Final	
Athlete	Event	Result	Rank	Result	Rank	Result	Rank
Tynia Gaither	100 m	11.19	2 Q	11.17	3 q	11.23	7
Denisha Cartwright	100 m	11.85	4	Did not advance			
Tynia Gaither	200 m	DNS		Did not advance			
Denisha Cartwright	200 m	24.49	5	Did not advance			
Devynne Charlton	100 m hurdles	12.70	2 Q	—N/a		12.58	2nd place, silver medalist(s)

== Boxing ==
As of 14 June 2022, a squad of two boxers will take part in the competition.

Men

Athlete	Event	Round of 32	Round of 16	Quarterfinals	Semifinals	Final	
Athlete	Event	Opposition Result	Opposition Result	Opposition Result	Opposition Result	Opposition Result	Rank
Rasheild Williams	Light welterweight	Bye	Jonas (NAM); L 0 - 5	Did not advance			
Carl Hield	Light middleweight	Osoba (NGR); L KO	Did not advance				

== Cycling ==
As of 14 June 2022, a squad of two cyclists will take part in the competition.

=== Road ===
Men

Athlete	Event	Time	Rank
Felix Neely	Road race	DNF	
Lorin Sawyer	Road race	DNF	
Felix Neely	Time trial	1:07:58.03	54
Lorin Sawyer	Time trial	1:02:19.72	44

== Judo ==
As of 14 June 2022, a squad of two judoka will take part in the competition.

Athlete	Event	Round of 16	Quarterfinals	Semifinals	Repechage	Final/BM	
Athlete	Event	Opposition Result	Opposition Result	Opposition Result	Opposition Result	Opposition Result	Rank
Andrew Munnings	Men's -73 kg	Powell (ENG); L 00 - 10	Did not advance				9
Cynthia Rahming	Women's -63 kg	Bye	B-Pinard (CAN); L 00 - 10	Did not advance	Semple (JAM); L 00 - 10	Did not advance	7

== Swimming ==
As of 14 June 2022, a squad of eight swimmers will take part in the competition.

Men

Athlete	Event	Heat		Semifinal		Final	
Athlete	Event	Time	Rank	Time	Rank	Time	Rank
Lamar Taylor	50 m freestyle	22.59	7 Q	22.45	7 Q	22.51	7
Lamar Taylor	100 m freestyle	51.10	23	Did not advance			
Luke-Kennedy Thompson	200 m freestyle	1:55.44	26	—N/a		Did not advance	
Luke-Kennedy Thompson	400 m freestyle	4:04.90	19	—N/a		Did not advance	
Devante Carey	50 m backstroke	25.86	16 Q	25.98	16	Did not advance	
Lamar Taylor	50 m backstroke	26.12	20	Did not advance			
Devante Carey	100 m backstroke	57.27	19	Did not advance			
Lamar Taylor	100 m backstroke	57.51	21	Did not advance			
Devante Carey	200 m backstroke	2:12.22	18	—N/a		Did not advance	
Izaak Bastian	50 m breaststroke	28.74	20	Did not advance			
Luke-Kennedy Thompson	50 m breaststroke	29.30	24	Did not advance			
Izaak Bastian	100 m breaststroke	1:04.07	23	Did not advance			
Lamar Taylor	50 m butterfly	24.21	18	Did not advance			
Devante Carey	100 m butterfly	56.58	25	Did not advance			

Women

Athlete	Event	Heat		Semifinal		Final	
Athlete	Event	Time	Rank	Time	Rank	Time	Rank
Katelyn Cabral	50 m freestyle	28.15	46	Did not advance			
Rhanishka Gibbs	50 m freestyle	26.85	22	Did not advance			
Zaylie-Elizabeth Thompson	100 m freestyle	1:00.60	34	Did not advance			
Rhanishka Gibbs	100 m freestyle	1:01.74	43	Did not advance			
Zaylie-Elizabeth Thompson	200 m freestyle	2:11.34	21	—N/a		Did not advance	
Katelyn Cabral	50 m backstroke	32.27	24	Did not advance			
Katelyn Cabral	200 m backstroke	2:33.19	12	—N/a		Did not advance	
Lilly Higgs	50 m breaststroke	33.18	16 Q	33.10	15	Did not advance	
Rhanishka Gibbs	50 m breaststroke	33.28	17	Did not advance			
Lilly Higgs	100 m breaststroke	1:12.67	16 Q	1:12.97	16	Did not advance	
Rhanishka Gibbs	100 m breaststroke	1:18.44	23	Did not advance			
Zaylie-Elizabeth Thompson	200 m breaststroke	2:51.09	13	—N/a		Did not advance	
Katelyn Cabral	50 m butterfly	29.56	34	Did not advance			
Katelyn Cabral	100 m butterfly	1:06.86	28	Did not advance			

Mixed

Athlete	Event	Heat		Final	
Athlete	Event	Time	Rank	Time	Rank
Lamar Taylor; Davante Carey; Zaylie-Elizabeth Thompson; Lillian Higgs	4 × 100 m freestyle relay	3:47.16	9	Did not advance	
Davante Carey; Lillian Higgs; Katelyn Cabral; Lamar Taylor	4 × 100 m medley relay	4:08.80	11	Did not advance	

== Triathlon ==
As of 14 June 2022, one triathlete will take part in the competition.

Individual

Athlete	Event	Swim (750 m)	Trans 1	Bike (20 km)	Trans 2	Run (5 km)	Total	Rank
Armando Moss	Men's	11:10	1:22	32:34	0:37	21:43	1:07:26	38

== Wrestling ==
As of 14 June 2022, a squad of two wrestlers will take part in the competition.

Key:

- VT - Victory by Fall.
- PP - Decision by Points - the loser with technical points.
- PO - Decision by Points - the loser without technical points.

Athlete	Event	Round of 16	Quarterfinal	Semifinal	Repechage	Final / BM	
Athlete	Event	Opposition Result	Opposition Result	Opposition Result	Opposition Result	Opposition Result	Rank
Thorn Demeritte	Men's -74 kg	Bowling (ENG); L 0 - 10	Did not advance				12
Rashji Mackey	Men's -97 kg	Raza (PAK); L 0 - 10	Did not advance				8
