= Swimming at the 2022 Commonwealth Games – Women's 100 metre butterfly =

Women's 100 metre butterfly at the 2022 Commonwealth Games
- Venue: Sandwell Aquatics Centre
- Dates: 29 July (heats, semifinals); 30 July (final)
- Competitors: 38 from 23 nations
- Winning time: 56.36

Medalists
gold medal	Maggie Mac Neil	Canada
silver medal	Emma McKeon	Australia
bronze medal	Brianna Throssell	Australia

The women's 100 metre butterfly event at the 2022 Commonwealth Games will be held on 29 and 30 July at the Sandwell Aquatics Centre.

== Records ==
Prior to this competition, the existing world, Commonwealth and Games records were as follows:

World record	Sarah Sjöström (SWE)	55.48	Rio de Janeiro, Brazil	7 August 2016
Commonwealth record	Maggie Mac Neil (CAN)	55.59	Tokyo, Japan	26 July 2021
Games record	Emma McKeon (AUS)	56.78	Brisbane, Australia	6 April 2018

The following records were established during the competition:

Date	Event	Name	Nationality	Time	Record
30 July	Final	Maggie Mac Neil	Canada	56.36	GR

== Schedule ==
The schedule is as follows:

All times are British Summer Time (UTC+1)

Date	Time	Round
Friday 29 July 2022	12:02	Qualifying
Friday 29 July 2022	20:56	Semifinals
Saturday 30 July 2022	20:58	Final

== Results ==
=== Heats ===
Rank	Heat	Lane	Name	Nationality	Time	Notes
1	4	4	Emma McKeon	Australia	57.34	Q
2	5	4	Maggie Mac Neil	Canada	57.94	Q
3	3	4	Brianna Throssell	Australia	58.40	Q
4	5	3	Alex Perkins	Australia	58.55	Q
5	4	5	Katerine Savard	Canada	58.56	Q
6	3	5	Rebecca Smith	Canada	58.89	Q
7	4	3	Alys Thomas	Wales	59.11	Q
8	5	5	Harriet Jones	Wales	59.25	Q
9	5	7	Erin Gallagher	South Africa	59.29	Q
10	4	7	Holly Hibbott	England	59.33	Q
11	5	6	Helena Gasson	New Zealand	59.37	Q
12	4	6	Quah Jing Wen	Singapore	59.51	Q
13	3	3	Keanna Macinnes	Scotland	59.56	Q
14	4	2	Tain Bruce	Scotland	59.77	Q
15	3	2	Duné Coetzee	South Africa	1:00.19	Q
16	4	1	Trinity Hearne	South Africa	1:00.42	Q
17	5	2	Quah Ting Wen	Singapore	1:00.52	R
18	3	6	Vanessa Ouwehand	New Zealand	1:01.03	R
19	5	1	Letitia Sim	Singapore	1:01.05	
20	4	8	Emily Muteti	Kenya	1:02.10	
21	2	1	Imara Thorpe	Kenya	1:02.16	
22	3	1	Emma Harvey	Bermuda	1:02.27	
23	2	4	Orla Rabey	Guernsey	1:02.37	
24	3	8	Kaitlyn McCaw	Northern Ireland	1:02.60	
25	3	7	Olivia Borg	Samoa	1:02.62	
26	2	5	Zaneta Alvaranga	Jamaica	1:03.02	
27	5	8	Kelsie Campbell	Jamaica	1:04.32	
28	2	3	Katelyn Cabral	Bahamas	1:06.86	
29	1	4	Aleka Persaud	Guyana	1:07.24	NR
30	2	2	Molly Staples	Guernsey	1:07.54	
31	2	6	Bisma Khan	Pakistan	1:08.21	
32	2	7	Rosemarie Rova	Fiji	1:08.95	
33	1	5	Alicia Mateus	Mozambique	1:10.69	
34	2	8	Hayley Hoy	Eswatini	1:12.21	
35	1	2	Tilly Collymore	Grenada	1:12.23	
36	1	3	Jamie Joachim	Saint Vincent and the Grenadines	1:12.81	
37	1	6	Charissa Panuve	Tonga	1:17.96	
38	1	7	Poppy Davis-Coyle	Saint Helena	1:20.02	

=== Semifinals ===
Rank	Heat	Lane	Name	Nationality	Time	Notes
1	2	4	Emma McKeon	Australia	57.49	Q
2	1	4	Maggie Mac Neil	Canada	57.72	Q
3	2	5	Brianna Throssell	Australia	57.99	Q
4	1	5	Alex Perkins	Australia	58.22	Q
5	2	3	Katerine Savard	Canada	58.57	Q
6	1	3	Rebecca Smith	Canada	58.59	Q
7	1	6	Harriet Jones	Wales	58.90	Q
8	1	2	Holly Hibbott	England	58.97	Q
9	2	2	Erin Gallagher	South Africa	59.02	R
10	1	7	Quah Jing Wen	Singapore	59.09	R
11	2	6	Alys Thomas	Wales	59.16	
12	2	7	Helena Gasson	New Zealand	59.39	
13	2	1	Keanna Macinnes	Scotland	59.57	
14	1	1	Tain Bruce	Scotland	59.99	
15	2	8	Duné Coetzee	South Africa	1:00.51	
16	1	8	Trinity Hearne	South Africa	1:00.60	

=== Final ===
Rank	Lane	Name	Nationality	Time	Notes
1st place, gold medalist(s)	5	Maggie Mac Neil	Canada	56.36	GR
2nd place, silver medalist(s)	4	Emma McKeon	Australia	56.38	
3rd place, bronze medalist(s)	3	Brianna Throssell	Australia	57.50	
4	6	Alex Perkins	Australia	57.87	
5	2	Katerine Savard	Canada	58.09	
6	1	Harriet Jones	Wales	59.02	
7	8	Holly Hibbott	England	59.28	
8	7	Rebecca Smith	Canada	59.54	
