= Chelsey Edwards =

New Zealand swimmer

Personal information
- Born: 15 June 2001 (age 25) Lower Hutt, New Zealand
- Height: 166 cm (5 ft 5 in)

Sport
- Sport: Swimming
- Strokes: Freestyle
- Club: SwimZone Racing, Capital Swim Club, Coast Swim Club, North Shore Swimming CLub
- Coach: Frank Tourelle, Gary Hollywood, Michael Weston, Graham Hill
Medal record
Commonwealth Youth Games
Gold medal – first place	2017 Nassau	4×200 m mixed freestyle

Chelsey Edwards (born 15 June 2001) is a New Zealand competitive swimmer who has represented New Zealand at three different world championship events and is a Commonwealth Youth Games gold medalist. Edwards competed at her first Commonwealth Games at the Glasgow 2026 Commonwealth Games, placing seventh in the women's 50 metre freestyle. She also finished fourth in the mixed 4 × 100 metre freestyle relay alongside Erika Fairweather, Carter Swift and Cameron Gray, with the team setting a New Zealand record of 3:24.82. Outside of swimming, Edwards works as a financial adviser in the personal insurance industry with I'n'I Advise.

Edwards attended Chilton Saint James School in Lower Hutt.

== Swimming career ==
=== 2017 Commonwealth Youth Games ===
At the 2017 Commonwealth Youth Games, held in Nassau, Edwards, alongside teammates Lewis Clareburt, Zac Reid and Laticia-Leigh Transom, claimed gold in the 4x200 metre freestyle relay in a time of 7:50.85 despite Edwards battling with sickness throughout the meet.

=== 2018 Junior Pan Pacific Championships ===
Edwards raced at the 2018 Junior Pan Pacific Swimming Championships in Suva with an 8th place finish in the A final of the 50 metre freestyle in a time of 26.60, an overall 13th place finish in the 200 metre freestyle in a time of 2:03.67, and an overall 15th place finish in the 100m freestyle in a time of 57.06.

=== 2019 World Championships ===
Edwards qualified to compete at the 2019 World Aquatics Championships held in Gwangju where she finished in 37th in a time of 26.05 in the 50m freestyle and was part of the 4x200 metre freestyle relay which finished 10th alongside Erika Fairweather, Carina Doyle and Eve Thomas.

=== 2022 World Championships ===
At the 2022 World Aquatics Championships held in Budapest, Edwards finished 23rd in the 50 metre freestyle in a time of 25.91. She also took part in the 4x100 metre mixed freestyle relay alongside Lewis Clareburt, Carter Swift and Laura Littlejohn which set a new national record in a time of 3:27.91 and narrowly missed out on a spot in the final.

=== 2023 World Championships ===
Racing at her third world championships, Edwards finished 29th in the 100 metre freestyle in a time of 56.04 and was part of the 4x100 metre mixed freestyle alongside Cameron Gray, Carter Swift and Helena Gasson that finished 16th.

=== 2025 ===
In June 2025, Edwards became the first New Zealand woman to break the 25-second barrier in the long-course 50 metre freestyle, swimming 24.99 at the Rossini Swim Cup in Pesaro, Italy. The performance set a new New Zealand record.

At the 2025 New Zealand Short Course Swimming Championships in Auckland, Edwards set a New Zealand record in the 100 metre freestyle while leading off North Shore's 4 × 100 metre freestyle relay, recording a time of 53.06. She went on to win the national title in the individual 100 metre freestyle in 53.20 and the 50 metre freestyle in 24.64.

In October, Edwards competed at the 2025 World Aquatics Swimming World Cup in Carmel, Indiana. In the women's 50 metre freestyle, she broke the New Zealand short-course record twice in the same day, first swimming 24.27 in the heats before lowering the record to 24.11 in the final, where she finished sixth. At the Carmel leg, Edwards also finished ninth in the 100 metre freestyle in 53.30 and recorded a personal best of 1:56.00 in the 200 metre freestyle, finishing 11th overall.

=== 2026 Mare Nostrum ===
At the 2026 Mare Nostrum meeting in Monaco, Edwards lowered her own New Zealand record in the women's 50 metre freestyle, swimming 24.97 during the quarter-finals of the event's speed tournament. The performance improved on her previous national record of 24.99, set in Italy in 2025. Edwards also recorded a personal best of 54.68 in the heats of the women's 100 metre freestyle, qualifying for the A final, where she finished sixth.

=== 2026 Commonwealth Games ===
Edwards competed at her first Commonwealth Games at the 2026 Commonwealth Games in Glasgow. She competed in the women's 50 metre freestyle, women's 100 metre freestyle and mixed 4 × 100 metre freestyle relay. Edwards finished seventh in the women's 50 metre freestyle and 22nd in the women's 100 metre freestyle. She also competed alongside Cameron Gray, Carter Swift and Erika Fairweather in the mixed 4 × 100 metre freestyle relay, with the team finishing fourth and setting a New Zealand record of 3:24.82.

=== 2026 Pan Pacific Championships ===
At the 2026 Pan Pacific Swimming Championships in Irvine, California, Edwards recorded two personal bests in the women's 100 metre freestyle. She swam 54.66 in the heats, finishing equal eighth and advancing to a swim-off against China's Fan Yaqi for a place in the championship final. Edwards lowered her personal best to 54.47 in the swim-off, narrowly missing a place in the A final by 0.09 seconds. She later finished fourth in the B final in 54.82.

Edwards also competed in the women's 4 × 100 metre freestyle relay alongside Erika Fairweather, Zoe Pedersen and Milan Glintmeyer. The team finished fourth in 3:38.38, breaking the New Zealand record by almost three seconds. Edwards recorded a 54.29 split on the second leg.
