= Swimming at the 2023 World Aquatics Championships – Women's 50 metre butterfly =

Women's 50 metre butterfly at the 2023 World Aquatics Championships
- Venue: Marine Messe Fukuoka
- Location: Fukuoka, Japan
- Dates: 28 July (heats and semifinals); 29 July (final)
- Competitors: 64 from 58 nations
- Winning time: 24.77

Medalists
gold medal	Sarah Sjöström	Sweden
silver medal	Zhang Yufei	China
bronze medal	Gretchen Walsh	United States

The women's 50 metre butterfly competition at the 2023 World Aquatics Championships was held on 28 and 29 July 2023.

== Records ==
Prior to the competition, the existing world and championship records were as follows.

World record	Sarah Sjöström (SWE)	24.43	Borås, Sweden	5 July 2014
Competition record	Sarah Sjöström (SWE)	24.60	Budapest, Hungary	29 July 2017

== Results ==
=== Heats ===
The heats were started on 28 July at 11:39.

Rank	Heat	Lane	Name	Nationality	Time	Notes
1	7	4	Sarah Sjöström	Sweden	25.04	Q
2	7	5	Zhang Yufei	China	25.33	Q
3	7	3	Rikako Ikee	Japan	25.50	Q
4	5	4	Mélanie Henique	France	25.75	Q
5	5	5	Farida Osman	Egypt	25.77	Q
6	6	4	Gretchen Walsh	United States	25.78	Q
7	5	8	Neža Klančar	Slovenia	25.81	Q, NR
8	7	6	Ai Soma	Japan	25.96	Q
9	6	5	Torri Huske	United States	25.98	Q
10	5	3	Angelina Köhler	Germany	26.02	Q
11	6	6	Sara Junevik	Sweden	26.04	Q
12	5	6	Anna Ntountounaki	Greece	26.14	Q
13	6	3	Maaike de Waard	Netherlands	26.17	Q
14	7	2	Yu Yiting	China	26.21	Q
15	5	1	Kim Busch	Netherlands	26.23	Q
15	7	1	Katerine Savard	Canada	26.23	Q
17	7	8	Helena Gasson	New Zealand	26.29	
18	6	7	Brianna Throssell	Australia	26.30	
19	6	2	Margaret MacNeil	Canada	26.33	
20	6	1	Julie Kepp Jensen	Denmark	26.36	
21	7	7	Emilie Beckmann	Denmark	26.43	
22	6	8	Celine Souza Bispo	Brazil	26.55	
22	7	0	Tamara Potocká	Slovakia	26.55	
24	5	7	Vanessa Ouwehand	New Zealand	26.57	
25	6	9	Quah Ting Wen	Singapore	26.67	
26	5	2	Paulina Peda	Poland	26.71	
27	4	6	Huang Mei-chien	Chinese Taipei	26.73	
28	5	0	Jenjira Srisa-Ard	Thailand	26.78	
29	5	9	Tayde Sansores	Mexico	26.82	
30	4	4	Danielle Hill	Ireland	26.90	
31	7	9	Tam Hoi Lam	Hong Kong	26.91	
32	6	0	Barbora Seemanová	Czech Republic	27.02	
33	4	5	Sirena Rowe	Colombia	27.19	
34	4	3	Lismar Lyon	Venezuela	27.53	
35	4	1	Olivia Borg	Samoa	27.77	NR
36	4	2	Amel Melih	Algeria	27.79	
37	4	8	Oumy Diop	Senegal	27.86	
38	4	7	Luana Alonso	Paraguay	28.13	
39	3	5	Rhanishka Gibbs	Bahamas	28.43	
40	4	0	Emily Muteti	Suspended Member Federation	28.46	
41	3	3	María José Ribera	Bolivia	28.58	
41	4	9	Maria Schutzmeier	Nicaragua	28.58	
43	3	7	Cherelle Thompson	Trinidad and Tobago	28.84	
44	3	6	Tara Naluwoza	Uganda	29.07	
45	1	7	Adaku Nwandu	Nigeria	29.38	
46	3	4	Mikaili Charlemagne	Saint Lucia	29.39	
47	3	2	Chloe Farro	Aruba	29.41	
48	3	1	Nubia Adjei	Ghana	29.54	
49	3	8	Bisma Khan	Pakistan	29.63	
50	3	0	Kennice Greene	Saint Vincent and the Grenadines	29.90	
51	3	9	Bianca Mitchell	Antigua and Barbuda	29.97	
52	2	4	Hayley Hoy	Eswatini	30.73	
53	2	5	Ayah Binrajab	Bahrain	30.86	
54	2	0	Abigail Ai Tom	Papua New Guinea	31.46	
55	2	3	Sonia Khatun	Bangladesh	31.51	
56	2	2	Ekaterina Bordachyova	Tajikistan	32.09	
57	1	4	Taeyanna Adams	Micronesia	32.53	
58	2	7	Arleigha Hall	Turks and Caicos Islands	32.55	
59	1	5	Maria Batallones	Northern Mariana Islands	33.49	
60	2	9	Alyse Maniriho	Burundi	36.57	
61	1	6	Lina Selo	Ethiopia	37.68	
62	2	1	Galyah Mikel	Palau	38.22	
63	2	8	Marie Amenou	Togo	39.50	
64	1	2	Claudette Ishimwe	Rwanda	41.44	
	1	3	Ruth Turay	Sierra Leone	DNS	
	2	6	Taffi Illis	Sint Maarten	DNS	

=== Semifinals ===
The semifinals were held on 28 July at 21:08.

Rank	Heat	Lane	Name	Nationality	Time	Notes
1	2	4	Sarah Sjöström	Sweden	24.74	Q
2	1	4	Zhang Yufei	China	25.17	Q, NR
3	1	3	Gretchen Walsh	United States	25.48	Q
4	1	5	Mélanie Henique	France	25.70	Q
5	2	5	Rikako Ikee	Japan	25.72	Q
6	2	3	Farida Osman	Egypt	25.74	Q
7	2	2	Torri Huske	United States	25.75	Q
8	2	7	Sara Junevik	Sweden	25.77	Q
9	1	7	Anna Ntountounaki	Greece	25.82	
10	2	6	Neža Klančar	Slovenia	25.83	
11	1	2	Angelina Köhler	Germany	25.88	
12	1	8	Katerine Savard	Canada	25.98	
13	2	1	Maaike de Waard	Netherlands	26.02	
14	2	8	Kim Busch	Netherlands	26.14	
15	1	6	Ai Soma	Japan	26.18	
16	1	1	Yu Yiting	China	26.27	

=== Final ===
The final was held on 29 July at 20:02.

Rank	Lane	Name	Nationality	Time	Notes
1st place, gold medalist(s)	4	Sarah Sjöström	Sweden	24.77	
2nd place, silver medalist(s)	5	Zhang Yufei	China	25.05	AS
3rd place, bronze medalist(s)	3	Gretchen Walsh	United States	25.46	
4	7	Farida Osman	Egypt	25.62	
5	1	Torri Huske	United States	25.64	
6	8	Sara Junevik	Sweden	25.74	
7	2	Rikako Ikee	Japan	25.78	
8	6	Mélanie Henique	France	25.80	
