= Swimming at the 2022 Commonwealth Games – Men's 50 metre butterfly =

Men's 50 metre butterfly at the 2022 Commonwealth Games
- Venue: Sandwell Aquatics Centre
- Dates: 29 July (heats, semifinals); 30 July (final)
- Competitors: 55 from 38 nations
- Winning time: 22.81 GR

Medalists
gold medal	Benjamin Proud	England
silver medal	Teong Tzen Wei	Singapore
bronze medal	Cameron Gray	New Zealand

The men's 50 metre butterfly event at the 2022 Commonwealth Games was held on 29 and 30 July at the Sandwell Aquatics Centre.

== Records ==
Prior to this competition, the existing world, Commonwealth and Games records were as follows:

World record	Andriy Govorov (UKR)	22.27	Rome, Italy	1 July 2018
Commonwealth record	Matt Targett (AUS)	22.73	Rome, Italy	27 July 2009
Games record	Benjamin Proud (ENG)	22.93	Glasgow, United Kingdom	25 July 2014

The following records were established during the competition:

Date	Event	Name	Nationality	Time	Record
30 July	Final	Benjamin Proud	England	22.81	GR

== Schedule ==
The schedule is as follows:

All times are British Summer Time (UTC+1)

Date	Time	Round
Friday 29 July 2022	11:24	Qualifying
Friday 29 July 2022	20:08	Semifinals
Saturday 30 July 2022	19:07	Final

== Results ==
=== Heats ===
Rank	Heat	Lane	Name	Nationality	Time	Notes
1	7	5	Kyle Chalmers	Australia	23.45	Q
2	5	4	Benjamin Proud	England	23.46	Q
3	7	4	Dylan Carter	Trinidad and Tobago	23.59	Q
4	6	5	Jacob Peters	England	23.64	Q
5	5	3	Matthew Temple	Australia	23.70	Q
6	7	6	Lewis Fraser	Wales	23.73	Q
7	7	3	Mikkel Lee	Singapore	23.79	Q
8	7	2	Chad Le Clos	South Africa	23.80	Q
9	5	5	Joshua Liendo	Canada	23.82	Q
10	6	3	Cody Simpson	Australia	23.84	Q
11	6	4	Teong Tzen Wei	Singapore	23.88	Q
12	6	2	Gregor Swinney	Scotland	23.91	Q, NR
13	5	6	Adam Barrett	England	23.98	Q
14	6	6	Cameron Gray	New Zealand	24.02	Q
15	5	7	Finlay Knox	Canada	24.14	Q
16	6	7	Clayton Jimmie	South Africa	24.17	Q
17	5	2	Abeiku Jackson	Ghana	24.19	R
18	4	5	Lamar Taylor	Bahamas	24.21	R
19	7	7	Tom Carswell	Wales	24.29	
20	6	1	Bryan Leong	Malaysia	24.50	
21	7	8	Joel Watterson	Isle of Man	24.67	
22	4	3	Akalanka Peiris	Sri Lanka	24.89	NR
23	5	8	Matthew Lawrence	Mozambique	25.00	
24	6	8	Sajan Prakash	India	25.01	
25	4	4	Hansel McCaig	Fiji	25.14	
26	4	2	Harry Robinson	Isle of Man	25.21	
27	5	1	Sidrell Williams	Jamaica	25.32	
28	4	7	Jack Allen	Jersey	25.51	
29	3	4	Collins Saliboko	Tanzania	25.52	
30	4	6	Adam Moncherry	Seychelles	25.67	
31	3	5	Peter Allen	Isle of Man	25.74	
32	3	6	Aidan Carroll	Gibraltar	25.84	
32	3	8	Tyler Fred	Seychelles	25.84	
34	3	2	Ridhwan Mohamed	Kenya	25.92	
35	2	4	Syed Tariq	Pakistan	25.97	NR
36	3	7	Kokoro Frost	Samoa	26.00	
37	1	4	Epeli Rabua	Fiji	26.01	
38	2	5	Temafa Yalimaiwai	Fiji	26.04	
39	4	1	Mathieu Bachmann	Seychelles	26.16	
40	3	1	Warren Lawrence	Dominica	26.19	
41	4	8	Md Nahid	Bangladesh	26.25	
42	3	3	Shane Caddgan	Saint Vincent and the Grenadines	26.39	
43	1	7	Johnpaul Balloqui	Gibraltar	26.51	
44	2	1	Ollie Brehaut	Jersey	26.72	
45	2	3	Alan Uhi	Tonga	26.83	
46	2	2	Isihaka Isihaka	Rwanda	26.84	
47	2	6	Paul Mahaica	Guyana	26.88	
48	2	7	Kumaren Naidu	Zambia	27.39	
49	2	8	Bryson George	Saint Vincent and the Grenadines	27.44	
50	1	3	Simanga Dlamini	Eswatini	28.98	
51	1	2	Edgar Iro	Solomon Islands	29.50	
52	1	6	Joshua Wyse	Sierra Leone	29.71	
53	1	5	Charly Ndjoume	Cameroon	30.28	
54	1	1	Tsinde Kumbatira	Malawi	31.04	
	7	1	Jayhan Odlum-Smith	Saint Lucia	DNS	

=== Semifinals ===
Rank	Heat	Lane	Name	Nationality	Time	Notes
1	1	4	Benjamin Proud	England	23.06	Q
2	2	7	Teong Tzen Wei	Singapore	23.24	Q
3	2	5	Dylan Carter	Trinidad and Tobago	23.41	Q
4	1	5	Jacob Peters	England	23.51	Q
4	2	2	Joshua Liendo	Canada	23.51	Q
6	1	3	Lewis Fraser	Wales	23.56	Q
7	1	1	Cameron Gray	New Zealand	23.58	Q
8	2	1	Adam Barrett	England	23.59	Q
9	2	3	Matthew Temple	Australia	23.63	R
10	2	4	Kyle Chalmers	Australia	23.65	R
11	1	6	Chad Le Clos	South Africa	23.67	
12	2	6	Mikkel Lee	Singapore	23.76	
13	2	8	Finlay Knox	Canada	23.77	
14	1	2	Cody Simpson	Australia	23.87	
15	1	8	Clayton Jimmie	South Africa	24.09	
16	1	7	Gregor Swinney	Scotland	24.21	

=== Final ===
Rank	Lane	Name	Nationality	Time	Notes
1st place, gold medalist(s)	4	Benjamin Proud	England	22.81	GR
2nd place, silver medalist(s)	5	Teong Tzen Wei	Singapore	23.21	
3rd place, bronze medalist(s)	1	Cameron Gray	New Zealand	23.27	NR
4	3	Dylan Carter	Trinidad and Tobago	23.28	
5	6	Jacob Peters	England	23.29	
6	2	Joshua Liendo	Canada	23.42	
7	8	Adam Barrett	England	23.57	
8	7	Lewis Fraser	Wales	23.71	
