= Hazel Ouwehand =

New Zealand swimmer (born 1999)

Personal information
- Full name: Vanessa Hazel Ouwehand
- Born: 30 December 1999 (age 26) Hamilton, New Zealand
- Height: 1.93 m (6 ft 4 in)

Sport
- Country: New Zealand
- Sport: Swimming
- Strokes: Butterfly
- Club: Phoenix Aquatics
- Coach: David Lyles
Medal record
Women's swimming
Representing New Zealand
Commonwealth Games
Bronze medal – third place	2026 Glasgow	50 m butterfly

Vanessa Hazel Ouwehand (born 30 December 1999) is a New Zealand competitive swimmer who has represented New Zealand at Olympics, World Championships and Commonwealth Games.

== Early life ==
Ouwehand was educated at Te Pahū Primary School and Te Awamutu College. In 2018, she moved to Auckland to study for a Bachelor of Accountancy degree at Massey University. She is of Dutch descent.

== Swimming career ==
=== 2018 World Championships ===
Ouwehand made her senior national debut at the 2018 FINA World Swimming Championships (25 m) held in Hangzhou, China. Individually, Ouwehand's best performance was the 100 metre butterfly which she finished 29th in a time of 1:01.46, followed by a 24th place finish in the 200 metre butterfly in a time of 2:17.52 and 39th in the 50m butterfly in a time of 27.85.

She was also involved in a number of relays including the 4x100 metre freestyle that finished 9th overall alongside Rebecca Moynihan, Paige Flynn and Emma Godwin, the 4x50 metre freestyle relay that finished 10th with Flynn, Moynihan and Godwin, the 4x100 metre medley relay with Godwin, Smith and Flynn that finished 13th and the 4x50 metre medley relay that finished 15th with Godwin, Ciara Smith and Moynihan.

=== 2022 Commonwealth Games ===
Ouwehand competed at the 2022 Commonwealth Games held in Birmingham, England where she made semi-finals in the 50 metre butterfly, 50 metre backstroke and 100 metre backstroke. Despite narrowly missing the qualification mark at the trials event in New Zealand, Ouwehand was selected for the team based on her rankings inside the Commonwealth in her 50 metre butterfly and given permission to start in the other events.

Swimming 29.05 in the heats of the 50 metre backstroke, Ouwehand finished 5th in the semi-final in a time of 28.85 and 10th overall in her best performance of the meet. She also made the semi-final of the 100 metre backstroke after swimming 1:03.86 in the heats, finishing 7th with a 1:04.10 in the semi-final. In the 50 metre butterfly, Ouwehand made the semi-final alongside teammate Helena Gasson although 27.01 was not enough for her to progress to the final. She also swum the 100 metre butterfly finishing 5th in her heat in a 1:01.03.

=== 2022 World Championships ===
Competing at her second short course World Championships, Ouwehand raced at the 2022 FINA World Swimming Championships (25 m) held in Melbourne, Australia. Ouwehand raced in the 100 metre backstroke finishing 25th in a time of 58.56. She was also part of the 4x100 metre freestyle relay with Godwin, Moynihan and Summer Osborne that finished 12th and the 4x100 metre medley relay with Godwin, Gasson and Moynihan.

=== 2023 World Championships ===
Ouwehand competed at the 2023 World Aquatics Championships held in Fukuoka, Japan. Here she finished 24th in the heats of the 50 metre butterfly in a time of 26.57 and 26th in the heats of the 100 metre butterfly in a time of 59.81. She was also part of the 4x100 mixed medley relay alongside Gasson, Josh Gilbert and Carter Swift that finished 17th.

=== 2024 Summer Olympics ===
At the New Zealand trials event for the 2024 Olympics, Ouwehand went under the qualification time for the 100 metre butterfly clocking a 57.43 and was later confirmed onto the team to attend the 2024 Summer Olympics held in Paris, France.

At the games, Ouwehand finished in 18th in the 100 metre butterfly in a time of 58.03.

Ouwehand is the current New Zealand record holder for the 100 metre butterfly both long course and short course, the 50 metre butterfly long course record holder, and was part of numerous female and mixed relays records. She was also the first New Zealand women to break 26 seconds in the 50m butterfly and the first New Zealand women to break 58 seconds in the 100m butterfly.
