= Swimming at the 2022 Commonwealth Games – Men's 50 metre backstroke =

Men's 50 metre backstroke at the 2022 Commonwealth Games
- Venue: Sandwell Aquatics Centre
- Dates: 31 July (heats, semifinals); 1 August (final)
- Competitors: 45 from 33 nations
- Winning time: 24.65

Medalists
gold medal	Andrew Jeffcoat	New Zealand
silver medal	Pieter Coetze	South Africa
bronze medal	Javier Acevedo	Canada

The men's 50 metre backstroke event at the 2022 Commonwealth Games will be held between 31 July 2022 and 1 August 2022 at the Sandwell Aquatics Centre.

== Records ==
Prior to this competition, the existing world, Commonwealth and Games records were as follows:

World record	Hunter Armstrong (USA)	23.71	Greensboro, United States	28 April 2022
Commonwealth record	Johannes Zandberg (RSA)	24.34	Rome, Italy	2 August 2009
Games record	Liam Tancock (ENG)	24.62	Delhi, India	5 October 2010

== Schedule ==
The schedule is as follows:

All times are British Summer Time (UTC+1)

Date	Time	Round
Sunday 31 July 2022	10:51	Heats
Sunday 31 July 2022	19:07	Semi-final
Monday 1 August 2022	20:37	Final

== Results ==
=== Heats ===
Rank	Heat	Lane	Name	Nationality	Time	Notes
1	5	4	Pieter Coetze	South Africa	24.95	Q
2	4	4	Andrew Jeffcoat	New Zealand	25.04	Q
3	5	5	Ben Armbruster	Australia	25.18	Q
4	6	2	Scott Gibson	Scotland	25.26	Q
5	4	3	Liam White	Wales	25.30	Q
6	4	6	Bradley Woodward	Australia	25.39	Q
7	4	5	Javier Acevedo	Canada	25.48	Q
8	6	3	Srihari Nataraj	India	25.52	Q
8	6	4	Mitch Larkin	Australia	25.52	Q
10	5	2	Joe Small	Wales	25.60	Q
11	6	7	Martyn Walton	Scotland	25.62	Q
12	5	3	Cameron Gray	New Zealand	25.67	Q
13	6	5	Quah Zheng Wen	Singapore	25.78	Q
14	5	6	Joe Litchfield	England	25.80	Q
15	4	7	Dylan Carter	Trinidad and Tobago	25.81	WD
16	4	1	Davante Carey	Bahamas	25.86	Q, NR
17	4	2	Harry Shalamon	Jersey	25.93	R, Q
18	5	7	Craig McNally	Scotland	26.03	R
19	6	8	Jack Kirby	Barbados	26.10	
20	3	4	Lamar Taylor	Bahamas	26.12	
21	5	1	Filippos Iakovidis	Cyprus	26.15	
21	6	6	Akalanka Peiris	Sri Lanka	26.15	NR
23	4	8	Sofoklis Mougis	Cyprus	26.40	
24	3	5	Harry Robinson	Isle of Man	26.72	
25	5	8	Jack Harvey	Bermuda	26.88	NR
26	6	1	Jeron Thompson	Trinidad and Tobago	26.93	
27	3	2	Warren Lawrence	Dominica	27.32	
28	3	6	Nathaniel Thomas	Jamaica	27.60	
29	2	2	Robbie Jones	Jersey	27.70	
30	2	5	Alan Koti Lopeti Uhi	Tonga	27.79	
31	3	1	Bede Aitu	Cook Islands	27.89	NR
31	3	3	Syed Muhammad Haseeb Tariq	Pakistan	27.89	
33	2	3	Tyler Fred	Seychelles	28.05	
34	3	7	Zackary Gresham	Grenada	28.09	
35	2	4	Kokoro Frost	Samoa	28.37	
36	2	1	Caio Lobo	Mozambique	28.65	
37	2	7	Rohan Shearer	Turks and Caicos Islands	28.69	
38	2	6	Sekhel Tzedeq	Guyana	28.74	
39	3	8	Jordan Gonzalez	Gibraltar	28.94	
40	1	4	Kenale Alleyne	Saint Vincent and the Grenadines	29.71	
41	2	8	Mohamed Aan Hussain	Maldives	30.08	
42	1	2	Alex Lake	Anguilla	31.06	
43	1	3	Bryson George	Saint Vincent and the Grenadines	31.35	
44	1	5	Mohamed Rihan Shiham	Maldives	32.41	
45	1	6	Joshua Yon	Saint Helena	33.37	

=== Semifinals ===
Rank	Heat	Lane	Name	Nationality	Time	Notes
1	2	4	Pieter Coetze	South Africa	24.81	Q
2	1	4	Andrew Jeffcoat	New Zealand	24.82	Q, NR
3	2	5	Ben Armbruster	Australia	25.21	Q
4	1	3	Bradley Woodward	Australia	25.25	Q
5	1	5	Scott Gibson	Scotland	25.29	Q
5	2	6	Javier Acevedo	Canada	25.29	Q
7	1	2	Joe Small	Wales	25.36	Q
8	1	6	Srihari Nataraj	India	25.38	Q
9	1	1	Joe Litchfield	England	25.44	R
10	2	3	Liam White	Wales	25.48	R
11	2	2	Mitch Larkin	Australia	25.53	
12	2	7	Martyn Walton	Scotland	25.58	
13	1	7	Cameron Gray	New Zealand	25.76	
14	1	8	Harry Shalamon	Jersey	25.85	
15	2	1	Quah Zheng Wen	Singapore	25.90	
16	2	8	Davante Carey	Bahamas	25.98	

=== Final ===
Rank	Lane	Name	Nationality	Time	Notes
1st place, gold medalist(s)	5	Andrew Jeffcoat	New Zealand	24.65	NR
2nd place, silver medalist(s)	4	Pieter Coetze	South Africa	24.77	
3rd place, bronze medalist(s)	7	Javier Acevedo	Canada	24.97	NR
4	6	Bradley Woodward	Australia	25.08	
5	8	Srihari Nataraj	India	25.23	
6	2	Scott Gibson	Scotland	25.34	
7	3	Ben Armbruster	Australia	25.37	
8	1	Joe Small	Wales	25.44	
