= Matthew Temple (swimmer) =

Australian swimmer

Personal information
- Nationality: Australian
- Born: 20 June 1999 (age 27) Bundoora, Australia
- Height: 1.87 m (6 ft 2 in)

Sport
- Sport: Swimming
- Strokes: Butterfly, freestyle
- Club: Marion Swim Club
- Coach: Peter Bishop
Medal record
Men's swimming
Representing Australia
Olympic Games
Bronze medal – third place	2020 Tokyo	4×100 m freestyle
Bronze medal – third place	2020 Tokyo	4×100 m mixed medley
Bronze medal – third place	2024 Paris	4×100 m mixed medley
World Championships (LC)
Gold medal – first place	2019 Gwangju	4×100 m mixed medley
Gold medal – first place	2023 Fukuoka	4×100 m freestyle
Silver medal – second place	2022 Budapest	4×100 m freestyle
Silver medal – second place	2022 Budapest	4×100 m mixed medley
Silver medal – second place	2023 Fukuoka	4×100 m mixed medley
Bronze medal – third place	2023 Fukuoka	4×100 m medley
World Championships (SC)
Gold medal – first place	2022 Melbourne	4×50 m freestyle
Gold medal – first place	2022 Melbourne	4×100 m medley
Silver medal – second place	2022 Melbourne	4×100 m freestyle
Silver medal – second place	2022 Melbourne	4×50 m mixed freestyle
Bronze medal – third place	2022 Melbourne	4×50 m medley
Bronze medal – third place	2024 Budapest	100 m butterfly
Commonwealth Games
Gold medal – first place	2022 Birmingham	4×100 m freestyle
Gold medal – first place	2022 Birmingham	4×100 m mixed medley
Gold medal – first place	2026 Glasgow	4×100 m freestyle
Gold medal – first place	2026 Glasgow	4×100 m medley
Silver medal – second place	2022 Birmingham	100 m butterfly
Silver medal – second place	2022 Birmingham	4×100 m medley
Silver medal – second place	2026 Glasgow	100 m butterfly
Bronze medal – third place	2026 Glasgow	200 m butterfly
Pan Pacific Championships
Gold medal – first place	2026 Irvine	100 m butterfly
Silver medal – second place	2026 Irvine	4×100 m medley
Silver medal – second place	2026 Irvine	4×100 m mixed medley

Matthew Temple (born 20 June 1999) is an Australian swimmer. He won 3 bronze medals at the Summer Olympics, and is the Australian record holder in the 100 m butterfly.

== Career ==
=== 2019–2021 ===
At the 2019 Australian Trials in Brisbane, Temple qualified for his first Australian team. He won the 100 m butterfly, tying with David Morgan in a personal best time of 51.47.

At the 2019 World Championships in Gwangju, Temple came 11th in the 200 m butterfly. He swam in the heats of the mixed 4 × 100 m medley relay, winning a gold medal after Australia finished first in the final. In the 100 m butterfly, he finished 6th in the final in a time of 51.51. He concluded the championships with the 4 × 100 m medley relay, where he split 50.99 and finished 5th.

At the 2021 Australian Trials in Adelaide, Temple qualified for his first Olympic team, doing so with personal bests in three events. The first was the 200 m butterfly, which he won in a time of 1:55.25. He then recorded 48.32 to finish second in the 100 m freestyle. On the final day of competition, Temple went 50.45 in the 100 m butterfly. This was a new Australian record, surpassing Andrew Lauterstein's mark of 50.85 from 2009.

At Tokyo Olympics, Temple's first event was the 4 × 100 m freestyle relay. He swam the first leg in a time of 48.07, and Australia won the bronze medal overall. He finished 18th in the 200 m butterfly and did not advance to the semifinals. In the seventh finals session, Temple swam two events. First was the 100 m butterfly final, where he finished equal-5th in a time of 50.92. He concluded the night by swimming the mixed 4 × 100 m medley relay, where Australia won the bronze medal. His final event was the men's 4 × 100 m medley relay, where Australia finished 5th.

=== 2022–Present ===
At the 2022 World Championships in Budapest, Temple competed in the 4 × 100 m freestyle relay, winning the silver medal. Swimming the mixed 4 × 100 m medley relay, Temple won his second silver of the championships. Individually, he finished 5th in the 100 m butterfly in a time of 51.15. He later competed in the 4 × 100 m medley relay, finishing 4th.

At the 2022 Short Course World Championships in Melbourne, Temple swam the second leg of the 4 × 50 m freestyle relay. Australia won the gold medal in a time of 1:23.44. On the final day of competition, Temple competed in two events. First was the 100 m butterfly, where he came 7th in a time of 49.67. He then swam the butterfly leg of the 4 × 100 m medley relay. Splitting 48.34, Temple worked to close a deficit between Australia and the USA. After a close final leg between Australia, USA and Italy, Australia and the USA dead-heated for the gold medal. Both teams broke the world record of 3:19.16 from 2009, and they finished 0.08 seconds ahead of Italy.

At the 2023 World Championships in Fukuoka, Temple swam in the heats of the 4 × 100 m freestyle relay. He won a gold medal after Australia placed first in the final. He swam the butterfly leg of the mixed medley relay, winning the silver medal. He finished 4th in the 100 m butterfly, recording a time of 50.81. His final event was the 4 × 100 m medley relay, where he won the bronze medal.

In December 2023, Temple competed at the Japan Open in Tokyo. Swimming the 100 m butterfly, he went 50.25 to break his own Australian record. Days later, he swam a time trial of the short course 100 m butterfly, recording a time of 48.62. This broke the Australian record of 49.31 held by Morgan.

At the 2024 Olympics, Temple came 7th in the 100 m butterfly with a time of 51.10. Swimming butterfly, he won the bronze medal in the mixed 4 × 100 m medley relay.

Temple qualified for the 2025 World Championships in Singapore. There, he came 5th in the 100 m butterfly.

== World records ==
=== Short course metres ===
No.	Event	Time	Meet	Location	Date	Status	Ref
1	4x100 m medley relay^{[a]}	3:18.98	2022 World Championships (25 m)	Melbourne, Australia	18 December 2022	Former	

^{a} split 48.34 (butterfly leg); with Isaac Cooper (backstroke leg), Joshua Yong (breaststroke leg), Kyle Chalmers (freestyle leg)

== Awards and honours ==
- Swimming Australia AIS Discovery of the Year: 2019
