= Emma Godwin =

New Zealand swimmer

Personal information
- Nationality: New Zealand
- Born: 24 April 1997 (age 29) Gisborne, New Zealand

Sport
- Sport: Swimming
- Strokes: Backstroke
- Club: Heretaunga Sundevils | North Shore
- Coach: Willy Benson

Emma Godwin (born 24 April 1997) is a competitive swimmer for New Zealand. She has represented New Zealand at three World championships during her career.

Godwin attended Iona College in Havelock North and Massey University in Auckland.

== Swimming career ==
=== 2018 World championships ===
Godwin qualified for her first senior international meet at the 2018 New Zealand Short Course Championship. At the 2018 FINA World Swimming Championships (25 m) held in Hangzhou, China, Godwin finished fifteenth in the 200 metre backstroke in a time of 2:08.31. She was also part of the 4x100 metre freestyle relay that finished ninth in a time of 3:42.69 alongside Paige Flynn, Rebecca Moynihan and Vanessa Ouwehand, the 4x50 metre freestyle relay that finished tenth in a time of 1:41.28 alongside Flynn, Moynihan and Ouwehand, the 4x200 metre freestyle relay that finished tenth in a time of 8:01.26 alongside Hayley McIntosh, Flynn and Caitlin Deans, the 4x100 metre medley relay that finished thirteenth in a time of 4:04.38 alongside Ciara Smith, Ouwehand and Flynn, the 4x50 metre medley relay that finished fifteenth in a time of 1:52.45 alongside Smith, Ouwehand and Moynihan.

=== 2022 World championships ===
Godwin returned to the New Zealand team in 2022 at the 2022 FINA World Swimming Championships (25 m) held in Melbourne, Australia. She competed in the 200 metre backstroke, finishing in twenty third in a time of 2:07.91 and the 50 metre backstroke, finishing 28th in a time of 27.37.

During the meet, Godwin also took part in a number of relays including the 4x50 metre freestyle relay alongside Helena Gasson, Rebecca Moynihan and Erika Fairweather. The relay team qualified for the final finishing eighth in a time of 1:37.93 in a new New Zealand record that continues to stand. The 4x100 metre freestyle relay team of Moynihan, Summer Osbourne and Hazel Ouwehand finished twelfth in a time of 3:40.47 and the 4x100 metre medley relay team of Gasson, Ouwehand and Moynihan finished thirteenth in a time of 4:00.92, a further national record.

=== 2024 World championships ===
Godwin would become a three-time World Champion representative when she competed at the 2024 World Aquatics Swimming Championships (25 m) held in Budapest, Hungary. She finished twentieth in the 200 metre backstroke in a time of 2:06.96. Godwin also was part of the 4x50 metre mixed relay team that finished sixteenth in a time of 1:32.74 alongside Jack Hendry, Hugo Wrathall and Zoe Pederson.
