= Lamar Taylor =

Bahamian swimmer (born 2003)

Personal information
- Nationality: Bahamas
- Born: 21 June 2003 (age 23) Freeport, Bahamas
- Height: 1.88 m (6 ft 2 in)

Sport
- Sport: Swimming
- Strokes: freestyle, backstroke
- College team: Henderson State Reddies
Medal record
Men's swimming
Representing the Bahamas
Pan American Games
Bronze medal – third place	2023 Santiago	50 m freestyle
Central American and Caribbean Games
Gold medal – first place	2023 San Salvador	50m backstroke
Bronze medal – third place	2023 San Salvador	50m freestyle
Junior Pan American Games
Silver medal – second place	2025 Asuncion	50 m freestyle
Bronze medal – third place	2025 Asuncion	100 m freestyle

Lamar Taylor (born 21 June 2003) is a Bahamian swimmer. He competed at the 2022 World Aquatics Championships, the 2022 Commonwealth Games and the 2024 Summer Olympics where he placed 26th in the 100m freestyle with a time of 48.84. He advanced to the final of the 2022 Commonwealth Games in the 50 m freestyle event.

== Major results ==
=== Individual ===
==== Long course ====
Year	Competition	Venue	Position	Event	Notes
Representing Bahamas
2022	Commonwealth Games	(United Kingdom) Birmingham, Great Britain	7th	50 m freestyle	22.51
2022	Commonwealth Games	(United Kingdom) Birmingham, Great Britain	23rd (h)	100 m freestyle	51.10
2022	Commonwealth Games	(United Kingdom) Birmingham, Great Britain	20th (h)	50 m backstroke	26.12
2022	Commonwealth Games	(United Kingdom) Birmingham, Great Britain	21st (h)	100 m backstroke	57.51
2022	Commonwealth Games	(United Kingdom) Birmingham, Great Britain	18th (h)	50 m butterfly	24.21

=== Relay ===
==== Long course ====
Year	Competition	Venue	Team	Position	Event	Notes
Representing Bahamas
2022	Commonwealth Games	(United Kingdom) Birmingham, Great Britain	Taylor / Carey / Thompson / Higgs	9th (h)	Mixed 4 × 100 m freestyle	3:47.16
2022	Commonwealth Games	(United Kingdom) Birmingham, Great Britain	Carey / Higgs / Cabral / Taylor	11th (h)	Mixed 4 × 100 m medley	4:08.80 NR

==== Short course ====
Year	Competition	Venue	Team	Position	Event	Notes
Representing Bahamas
2021	World Championships	Abu Dhabi, United Arab Emirates	Taylor / Bastian / Higgs / Evans	12th (h)	Mixed 4 × 50 m freestyle	1:36.43
2022	World Championships	Melbourne, Australia	Taylor / Thompson / Gibbs / Russell	16th (h)	Mixed 4 × 50 m freestyle	1:36.95
2022	World Championships	Melbourne, Australia	Taylor / Russell / Thompson / Gibbs	22nd (h)	Mixed 4 × 50 m medley	1:46.93
