= Michael Pickett (swimmer) =

New Zealand swimmer (born 2002)

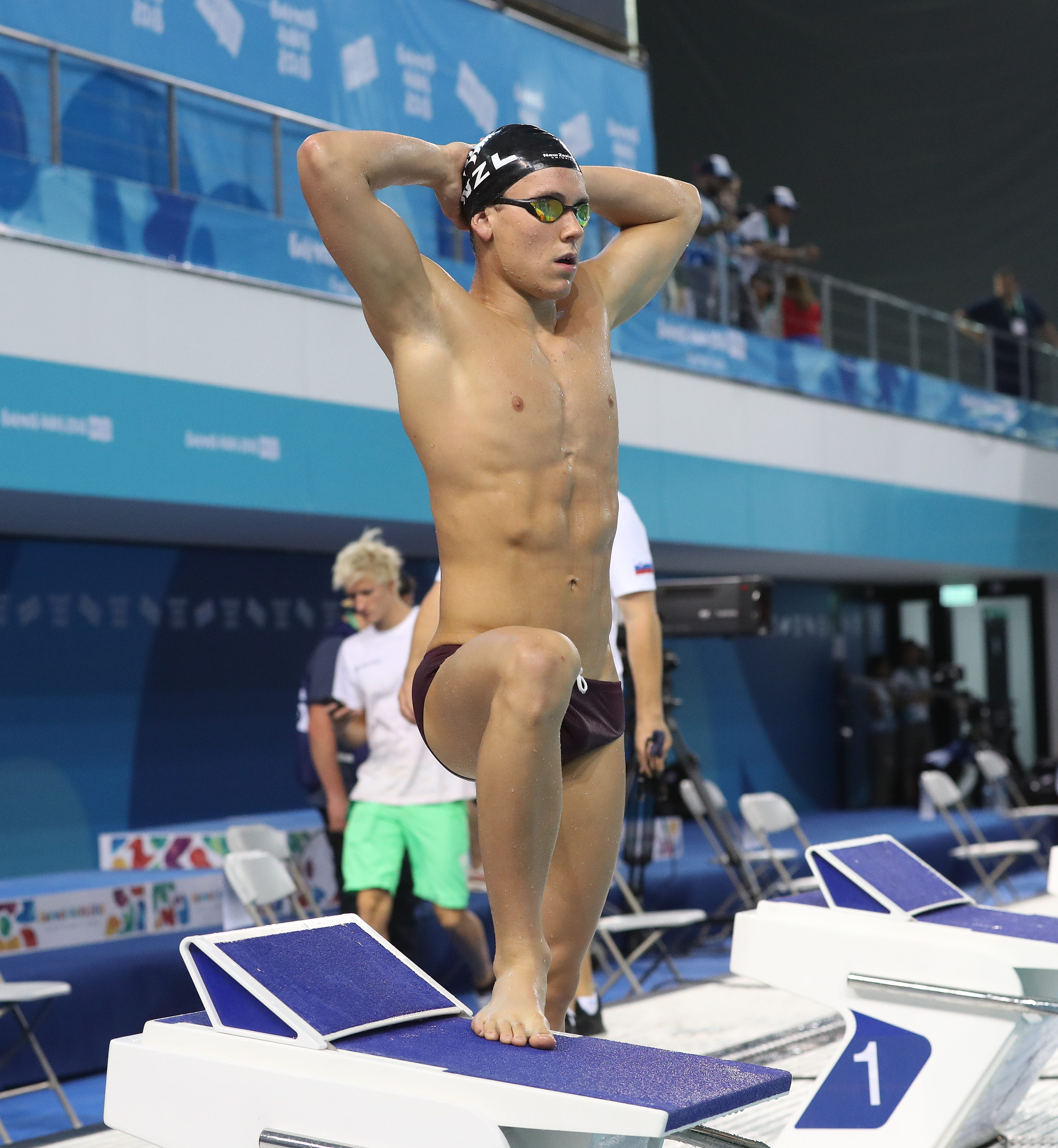
- Michael Pickett at the 2018 Youth Olympics

Personal information
- Born: 17 August 2002 (age 23)
- Height: 1.84 m (6 ft 0.4 in)
- Weight: 83 kg (183 lb)

Sport
- Sport: Swimming
- Strokes: Freestyle
- Club: Pukekohe Swimming Club, St Peters Western
Medal record
Men's swimming
Representing New Zealand
Junior Pan Pacific Championships
Bronze medal – third place	2018 Suva	50 m freestyle

Michael Pickett (born 17 August 2002) is a New Zealand swimmer. He represented New Zealand at the 2019 World Aquatics Championships held in Gwangju, South Korea and he finished in 38th place in the heats in the men's 50 metre freestyle event.

In 2018, he competed in the boys' 50 metre freestyle at the Summer Youth Olympics held in Buenos Aires, Argentina. He also competed in the boys' 100 metre freestyle and mixed 4 × 100 metre freestyle relay events. In both the 50 metre and 100 metre events he advanced to the semi-finals and he did not advance to compete in the final.

He also competed in the men's 50 metre freestyle event at the 2022 World Aquatics Championships and the men's 50 metre freestyle event at the 2023 World Aquatics Championships.
