= Andrew Jeffcoat =

New Zealand swimmer

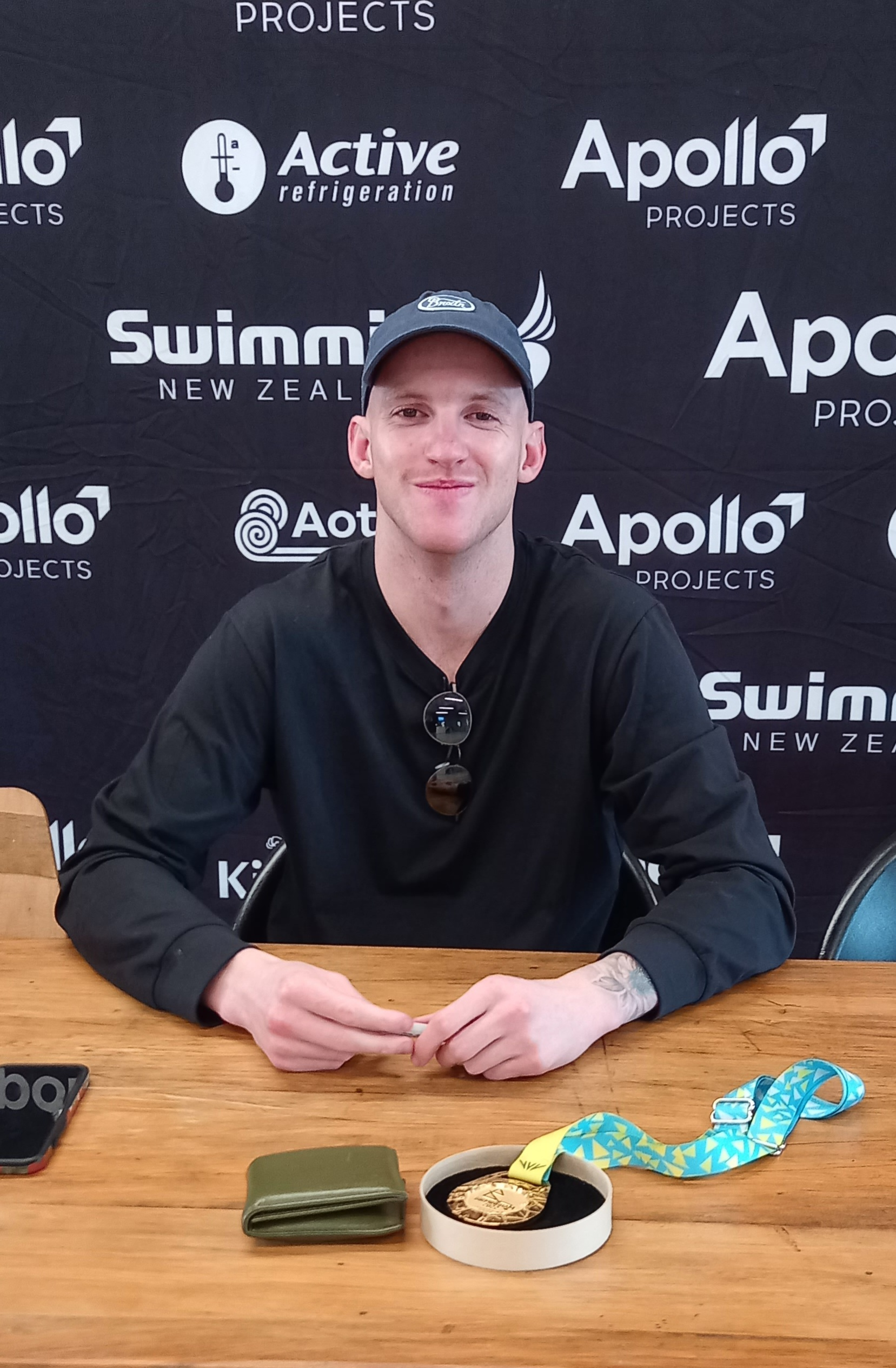

Personal information
- Full name: Andrew Trevor Jeffcoat
- Nationality: New Zealand
- Born: 22 July 1999 (age 27) Port Macquarie
- Height: 187 cm (6 ft 2 in)
- Weight: 82 kg (181 lb)

Sport
- Sport: Swimming
- Strokes: Backstroke
- Club: Club^{37}
- Coach: Mitchell Nairn
Medal record
Men's swimming
Representing New Zealand
Commonwealth Games
Gold medal – first place	2022 Birmingham	50 m backstroke
Oceania Championships
Silver medal – second place	2018 Port Moresby	100 m backstroke
Silver medal – second place	2018 Port Moresby	200 m backstroke
Bronze medal – third place	2018 Port Moresby	50 m backstroke

Andrew Jeffcoat (born 22 July 1999) is a New Zealand swimmer. He competed in the men's 50 metre backstroke event at the 2018 FINA World Swimming Championships (25 m), in Hangzhou, China. As of November 2022, he holds all three backstroke overall short course New Zealand records.

In April 2022 Jeffcoat was selected alongside six other debutants in a twelve-strong team to compete at the 2022 Commonwealth Games. He competed in all of the backstroke events, the 50, 100, and 200, and he won gold in the 50.

== Personal best times ==
As of 27 November 2022.

Long Course
Event	Time	Meet	Date	Note(s)	ref
50 m backstroke	24.65	2022 Commonwealth Games	1 August 2022	NR	
100 m backstroke	53.72	2021 Waikato Championships	29 May 2021		
200 m backstroke	1:58.51	2019 McDonald's Queensland Championships	17 December 2019		

Short Course
Event	Time	Meet	Date	Note(s)	ref
50 m backstroke	23.46	NSS SC Invitational	9 October 2020	NR	
100 m backstroke	51.02	NSS SC Invitational	6 October 2020	NR	
200 m backstroke	1:53.57	NSS SC Invitational	10 October 2020	NR	
