= Joshua Gilbert (swimmer) =

New Zealand swimmer (born 2001)

Joshua Donald Gilbert (born 9 June 2001) is a New Zealand swimmer specialising in breaststroke.

== Swimming career ==
Gilbert began swimming at a young age under Clive Wheeler at Stratford Flyers swimming club in Taranaki, New Zealand. Gilbert later joined Evolution Aquatics Tauranga before becoming one of the first swimmers to join Club 37 in Auckland, New Zealand.

Gilbert was a highly successful junior swimmer medaling in age-group state and national championships in New Zealand and Australia and setting multiple regional and national age-group records as a junior swimmer. Gilbert is a multiple national champion and has achieved multiple clean-sweeps in the breaststroke events at the New Zealand short-course and long-course Championships.

Gilbert represents New Zealand at international competitions including the 2022 FINA short-course World Championships in Melbourne, Australia and the 2023 FINA World Championships in Fukuoka, Japan where he was part of relay teams setting national records. In Melbourne, Gilbert swam in the breaststroke legs for the 4 × 100 m and 4 x 50m medley relays, with both teams swimming New Zealand record times. In Fukuoka, Gilbert swam the breaststroke leg of the 4 × 100 m mixed medley relay, with the team again setting a New Zealand record with a time of 3:49.26.

On 21 August 2024 Gilbert set the New Zealand short-course record for 200m breaststroke in a time of 2:04.57, a record previously held by Glenn Snyders since 2008.

On 23 August 2024 Gilbert set the New Zealand short-course record for 100m breaststroke in a time of 57.57, a record previously held by Glenn Snyders since 2014. In his post-race interview Gilbert stated he had been present as a 13-year-old in Wellington, New Zealand to witness Snyders set the record he had just taken from him.
