= Cameron Gray (swimmer) =

New Zealand swimmer (born 2003)

Personal information
- Born: 13 August 2003 (age 23) Auckland, New Zealand
- Height: 1.96 m (6 ft 5 in)
- Weight: 91 kg (201 lb)

Sport
- Sport: Swimming
- Strokes: Freestyle; Butterfly; Backstroke
- Club: United swim Club
- Coach: Andy McMillan
Medal record
Men's swimming
Representing New Zealand
Commonwealth Games
Bronze medal – third place	2022 Birmingham	50 m butterfly

Cameron Gray (born 13 August 2003) is a New Zealand swimmer specialising in sprint events. He first represented his country at the 2024 Summer Olympics, and won a bronze medal in the 50 metre butterfly at the 2022 Commonwealth Games.

== Biography ==
Born in Auckland on 13 August 2003, Gray was educated at Westlake Boys High School. He began his swimming career at the North Shore Swimming Club under the tutelage of former New Zealand swimmer Andy McMillan.

He made his senior international debut in 2022 at the 2022 World Aquatics Championships, finishing 35th in the 50 m butterfly and 39th in the 200 m freestyle.

Gray represented his country at the 2022 Commonwealth Games. In the 50 metre butterfly, he recorded a time of 24.02 seconds in the heats to qualify 14th fastest for the semifinals. He then was seventh fastest in the semifinals, with a time of 23.58 seconds, and swam a time of 23.27 seconds in the final to win the bronze medal and set a new New Zealand Record. Gray also competed in the 50 metre backstroke, 50 metre freestyle, 100 metre freestyle and 200 metre freestyle.

Gray would cap off his year at the 2022 FINA World Swimming Championships (25m) with some strong performances including a 30th in the 50 metre freestyle, 18th in the 50 metre backstroke, 26th in 50 metre butterfly and multiple relays.

At the 2023 World Aquatics Championships in Fukuoka, Gray, now swimming at the Coast Swimming club in Auckland under Michael Weston, finished 19th in the 100 metre freestyle and 25th in the 50 metre butterfly.

Moving into 2024, Gray competed at the 2024 World Aquatics Championships in Doha headlined with a semi-final appearance in the 100 metre freestyle where he finished in 14th, as well as a 20th-place finish in the 50m butterfly and 38th-place finish in the 50 metre freestyle.

At the 2024 Summer Olympics, Gray finished 31st in the 100 metre freestyle and 32nd in the 100 metre butterfly.
