= Carter Swift =

New Zealand swimmer

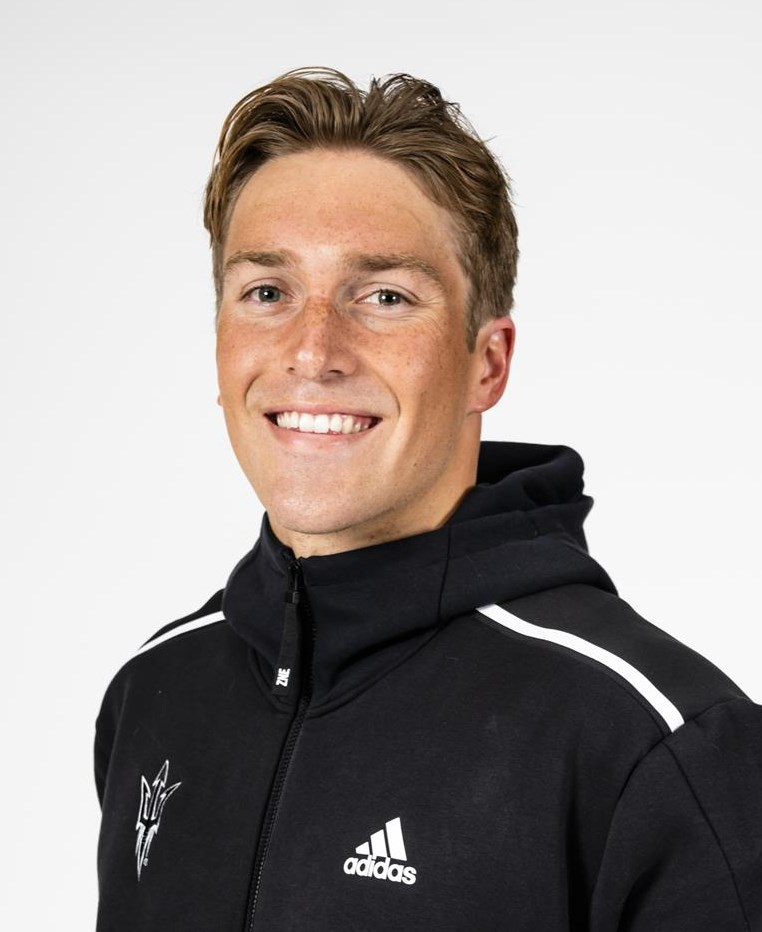
- Swift in 2023

Personal information
- Full name: Carter Owen Barrie Swift
- Born: 1 December 1998 (age 27) Manaia, Taranaki, New Zealand
- Height: 184 cm (6 ft 0 in)
- Weight: 89 kg (196 lb)

Sport
- Country: New Zealand
- Sport: Swimming
- Strokes: Freestyle
- Club: Club^{37}
- College team: Arizona State Sun Devils
- Coach: Mitchell Nairn, Herbert Behm

Carter Owen Barrie Swift (born 1 December 1998) is a New Zealand swimmer who specialises in Freestyle.

== Swimming career ==
Swift began swimming at a young age under Wilhemnia O'Callaghan and his mother Michelle Swift, who was the head coach of Shepparton Swimming Club. Swift later joined Eastern Michigan University's men's swim and dive team in the latter half of 2017. He transferred to Arizona State University following his freshman year.

Throughout his College Career, Swift went on to become a 9-time NCAA Division 1 All-American with the Sun Devils penultimately finishing his career with a runner-up finish in the 4x100 Freestyle relay at the NCAA Division 1 Championships.

Swift has gone on the be one of the fastest Freestyle sprinters in New Zealand, holding multiple national records across individual and relay events. He has become a staple name in the 100m Freestyle on the domestic and international stage.

He is the current national record holder in the 100m Freestyle(SCM)

== Personal bests ==
As of 13 April 2024.

Long Course
Event	Time	Meet	Date	Note(s)	ref
50 m freestyle	22.67	TYR Pro Swim Series San Antonio 2022	1 April 2022		
100 m freestyle	48.66	2024 Swimming New Zealand Olympic Trials	9 April 2024		
200 m freestyle	1:50.80	Victorian Open Championships 2024	24 February 2024		

Short Course
Event	Time	Meet	Date	Note(s)	ref
50 m freestyle	21.52	2022 World Aquatics Short Course Swimming Championships	16 December 2022		
100 m freestyle	47.17	2022 Apollo Projects New Zealand Short Course Swimming Championships	26 August 2022	NR	
200 m freestyle	1:44.88	2022 World Aquatics Short Course Swimming Championships	18 December 2022		
