= Helena Gasson =

New Zealand swimmer (born 1994)

Personal information
- Born: 8 December 1994 (age 31)
- Height: 5 ft 8 in (1.73 m)
- Weight: 70 kg (150 lb)

Sport
- Country: New Zealand
- Sport: Swimming
- Event: Individual Medley
- League: ISL
- Club: Coast Swimming Club
- Team: LA Current
- Coached by: Michael Weston

Helena Gasson (born 8 December 1994) is a New Zealand Olympic swimmer representing her country at the 2016 Rio Olympic Games. She has also competed internationally at the 2015 World University Games, the 2017 World Swimming Championships and the 2018 Commonwealth Games. Helena is currently part of the Coast Swim Club Elite Team and the LA Current (Season 2) in the ISL.

== Personal life ==
Gasson was born on 8 December 1994 in Auckland, New Zealand, and grew up in Waikato. She attended the University of Waikato where she studied a bachelor's degree in Sport and Leisure Studies as part of the Sir Edmund Hillary Scholarship Programme. Gasson has four siblings Jacqlyn, Natalie, Deliah and William.

== Career ==
Gasson is currently a member of the Coast Swimming Club as part of their Elite Team training out of Northern Arena in the north of Auckland. She is currently coached by her partner Michael Weston.

In 2013, she won a silver medal in the 200 metre butterfly event at the New Zealand Open Championships. In 2014, she again won the 200 metre butterfly silver medal and also finished second in the 400 metre individual medley event. At the 2015 Championships she won four national titles, in the 200 metre and 400 metre individual medley and the 100 metre and 200 metre butterfly.

At the 2016 New Zealand open swimming championships she broke the national record in the women's 100 metre butterfly in her heat, reaching the qualification standard for the 2016 Summer Olympics in the process. Her finishing time of 58.66 seconds was 8/100ths of a second under the qualifying time for the Olympics, and 5/100ths of a second faster than the previous national record set by Sophia Batchelor in 2012. She broke her own national record in the heats of the 200 metre butterfly; her time of two minutes 9.84 seconds was over a second faster than her previous best but she missed out on the qualifying time for Olympics by under half a second. She went on to win national titles in the 100 metre butterfly, 400 metre individual medley and the 50 metre butterfly and finished second in the 200 metre butterfly.

On 15 April 2016 Gasson was named as one of five Olympic debutants in a squad of eight swimmers to represent New Zealand at the 2016 Summer Olympics in Rio de Janeiro, Brazil, where she competed in the women's 100 metre butterfly and women's 200 metre butterfly.

In 2017 Gasson qualified for the World Swimming Championships where she competed in the 200 and 400 IM, and the 50 and 200 butterfly.

In 2018 Gasson represented New Zealand again at the Commonwealth Games competing in the 50, 100 and 200 butterfly, as well as the 4 x 100 Medley and 4 x 100 Freestyle relay teams.

In 2019 Gasson broke 7 New Zealand Short Course Records at the 2019 New Zealand Short Course Championships in the 50, 100 and 200 butterfly, and the 100 and 200 IM races. For this, Gasson was awarded Joint Domestic Swimmer of the Year in 2019.

In 2020 she was selected as part of the LA Current team to compete in Season 2 of the International Swim League competing in Budapest, Hungary.
