= Swimming at the 2022 Commonwealth Games =

- Venue: Sandwell Aquatics Centre
- Dates: 29 July – 3 August 2022
- Competitors: 449 from 57 nations

Swimming at the 2022 Commonwealth Games was the 22nd appearance of Swimming at the Commonwealth Games. The swimming events at the 2022 Commonwealth Games were held in Birmingham, England. The sport had been staged in all twenty-one previous editions of the Games thus far, and will be contested in England for the third time.

The competition took place between 29 July and 3 August 2022, spread across fifty-two events (including twelve parasport events). For the first time, visually impaired swimming was held at the Commonwealth Games.

== Schedule ==
The competition schedule was as follows:

H	Heats	½	Semi-finals	F	Final

Men
Date Event	Fri 29		Sat 30		Sun 31		Mon 1		Tue 2		Wed 3	
Session →	M	E	M	E	M	E	M	E	M	E	M	E
50 m freestyle									H	½		F
50 m freestyle S7							H	F				
50 m freestyle S13			H	F								
100 m freestyle					H	½		F				
200 m freestyle			H	F								
200 m freestyle S14											H	F
400 m freestyle	H	F										
1500 m freestyle									H			F
50 m backstroke					H	½		F				
100 m backstroke	H	½		F								
100 m backstroke S9	H	F										
200 m backstroke									H	F		
50 m breaststroke							H	½		F		
100 m breaststroke			H	½		F						
100 m breaststroke SB8					H	F						
200 m breaststroke	H	F										
50 m butterfly	H	½		F								
100 m butterfly							H	½		F		
100 m butterfly S10									H	F		
200 m butterfly					H	F						
200 m individual medley											H	F
400 m individual medley			H	F								
4×100 m freestyle relay			H	F								
4×200 m freestyle relay							H	F				
4×100 m medley relay											H	F

Women
Date Event	Fri 29		Sat 30		Sun 31		Mon 1		Tue 2		Wed 3	
Session →	M	E	M	E	M	E	M	E	M	E	M	E
50 m freestyle			H	½		F						
50 m freestyle S13			H	F								
100 m freestyle							H	½		F		
100 m freestyle S9	H	F										
200 m freestyle	H	F										
200 m freestyle S14											H	F
400 m freestyle											H	F
800 m freestyle							H			F		
50 m backstroke									H	½		F
100 m backstroke			H	½		F						
100 m backstroke S8					H	F						
200 m backstroke							H	F				
50 m breaststroke	H	½		F								
100 m breaststroke							H	½		F		
100 m breaststroke SB6							H	F				
200 m breaststroke					H	F						
50 m butterfly					H	½		F				
100 m butterfly	H	½		F								
200 m butterfly									H	F		
200 m individual medley							H	F				
200 m individual medley SM10									H	F		
400 m individual medley	H	F										
4×100 m freestyle relay			H	F								
4×200 m freestyle relay					H	F						
4×100 m medley relay											H	F

Mixed
Date Event	Fri 29		Tue 2	
Session →	M	E	M	E
4×100 m freestyle relay	H	F		
4×100 m medley relay			H	F

== Venue ==
The swimming competitions were held at the Sandwell Aquatics Centre, the only new-build permanent venue constructed for the Games. The diving competition also took place there.

== Qualification (parasport) ==
A total of up to 96 para swimmers (48 per gender) qualified to compete at the Games. Nations may earn three quotas per event, allocated as follows:

- Athletes in the World Para Swimming (WPS) World Rankings (for performances between 31 December 2020 and 18 April 2022).
- Recipients of a CGF/WPS Bipartite Invitation.

== Medal summary ==
=== Medal table ===
* Host nation (England)

Rank	CGA	Gold	Silver	Bronze	Total
1	Australia	25	21	19	65
2	England*	8	16	8	32
3	Canada	7	7	6	20
4	New Zealand	5	2	2	9
5	South Africa	4	4	3	11
6	Scotland	2	1	9	12
7	Northern Ireland	1	1	1	3
8	Singapore	0	2	0	2
9	Wales	0	0	2	2
Totals (9 entries)		52	54	50	156

=== Medalists ===
==== Men ====
Event	Gold		Silver		Bronze	
50 metre freestyle	Benjamin Proud; England	21.36	Lewis Burras; England	21.88	Joshua Liendo; Canada	22.02
100 metre freestyle	Kyle Chalmers; Australia	47.51	Tom Dean; England	47.89	Duncan Scott; Scotland	48.27
200 metre freestyle	Duncan Scott; Scotland	1:45.02	Tom Dean; England	1:45.41	Elijah Winnington; Australia	1:45.62
400 metre freestyle	Elijah Winnington; Australia	3:43.06	Samuel Short; Australia	3:45.07	Mack Horton; Australia	3:46.49
1500 metre freestyle	Samuel Short; Australia	14:48.54	Daniel Wiffen; Northern Ireland	14:51.79; NR	Luke Turley; England	15:12.78
50 metre backstroke	Andrew Jeffcoat; New Zealand	24.65; NR	Pieter Coetze; South Africa	24.77	Javier Acevedo; Canada	24.97; NR
100 metre backstroke	Pieter Coetze; South Africa	53.78	Brodie Williams; England	53.91	Bradley Woodward; Australia	54.06
200 metre backstroke	Brodie Williams; England	1:56.40	Bradley Woodward; Australia	1:56.41	Pieter Coetze; South Africa	1:56.77
50 metre breaststroke	Adam Peaty; England	26.76	Samuel Williamson; Australia	26.97	Ross Murdoch; Scotland	27.32
100 metre breaststroke	James Wilby; England	59.25	Zac Stubblety-Cook; Australia	59.52	Samuel Williamson; Australia	59.82
200 metre breaststroke	Zac Stubblety-Cook; Australia	2:08.07	James Wilby; England	2:08.59	Ross Murdoch; Scotland	2:10.41
50 metre butterfly	Benjamin Proud; England	22.81; GR	Tzen Wei Teong; Singapore	23.21	Cameron Gray; New Zealand	23.27; NR
100 metre butterfly	Joshua Liendo; Canada	51.24	James Guy; England Matthew Temple; Australia	51.40	Not awarded as there was a tie for silver.	
200 metre butterfly	Lewis Clareburt; New Zealand	1:55.60	Chad Le Clos; South Africa	1:55.89	James Guy; England	1:56.77
200 metre individual medley	Duncan Scott; Scotland	1:56.88; GR	Tom Dean; England	1:57.01	Lewis Clareburt; New Zealand	1:57.59
400 metre individual medley	Lewis Clareburt; New Zealand	4:08.70; CR, OC	Brendon Smith; Australia	4:10.15	Duncan Scott; Scotland	4:11.27
4 × 100 metre freestyle relay	Australia; Flynn Southam (48.54); Zac Incerti (47.96); William Yang (47.60); Kyle Chalmers (47.02); Matthew Temple^{[a]} Cody Simpson^{[a]} Elijah Winnington^{[a]}	3:11.12; GR	England; Lewis Burras (48.39); Jacob Whittle (47.94); James Guy (48.70); Tom Dean (46.70); Edward Mildred^{[a]} Joe Litchfield^{[a]} Jamie Ingram^{[a]} Cameron Kurle^{[a]}	3:11.73	Canada; Joshua Liendo (48.33); Ruslan Gaziev (48.13); Finlay Knox (48.82); Javier Acevedo (47.73); Stephen Calkins^{[a]} Jeremy Bagshaw^{[a]} Eric Brown^{[a]}	3:13.01
4 × 200 metre freestyle relay	Australia; Elijah Winnington (1:46.36); Flynn Southam (1:46.08); Zac Incerti (1:46.08); Mack Horton (1:46.44)	7:04.96; GR	England; James Guy (1:46.87); Jacob Whittle (1:47.89); Joe Litchfield (1:47.59); Tom Dean (1:45.15)	7:07.50	Scotland; Stephen Milne (1:49.30); Evan Jones (1:47.64); Mark Szaranek (1:47.91); Duncan Scott (1:44.48)	7:09.33
4 × 100 metre medley relay	England; Brodie Williams (54.02); James Wilby (59.22); James Guy (51.22); Tom Dean (47.34); Luke Greenbank^{[a]} Greg Butler^{[a]} Jacob Peters^{[a]} Jacob Whittle^{[a]}	3:31.80	Australia; Bradley Woodward (54.07); Zac Stubblety-Cook (59.92); Matthew Temple (51.03); Kyle Chalmers (46.86); Mitch Larkin^{[a]} Samuel Williamson^{[a]} Cody Simpson^{[a]} William Yang^{[a]}	3:31.88	Scotland; Craig McNally (54.79); Ross Murdoch (59.59); Duncan Scott (51.74); Evan Jones (48.99); Martyn Walton^{[a]} Craig Benson^{[a]} Greg Swinney^{[a]} Stephen Milne^{[a]}	3:35.11

==== Parasport ====
Event	Gold		Silver		Bronze	
50 metre freestyle S7	Matthew Levy; Australia	28.95	Toh Wei Soong; Singapore	29.10	Christian Sadie; South Africa	29.78
50 metre freestyle S13	Nicolas-Guy Turbide; Canada	24.32	Stephen Clegg; Scotland	24.33	Jacob Templeton; Australia	24.47
200 metre freestyle S14	Nicholas Bennett; Canada	1:54.97; GR	Benjamin Hance; Australia	1:55.50	Jack Ireland; Australia	1:56.15
100 metre backstroke S9	Timothy Hodge; Australia	1:01.88; GR	Jesse Reynolds; New Zealand	1:03.65	Barry McClements; Northern Ireland	1:05.09
100 metre breaststroke SB8	Joshua Willmer; New Zealand	1:14.12	Timothy Hodge; Australia	1:14.19	Blake Cochrane; Australia	1:18.97
100 metre butterfly S10	Col Pearse; Australia	56.91	Alex Saffy; Australia	57.53	James Hollis; England	58.55

==== Women ====
Event	Gold		Silver		Bronze	
50 metre freestyle	Emma McKeon; Australia	23.99	Meg Harris; Australia	24.32	Shayna Jack; Australia	24.36
100 metre freestyle	Mollie O'Callaghan; Australia	52.63	Shayna Jack; Australia	52.88	Emma McKeon; Australia	52.94
200 metre freestyle	Ariarne Titmus; Australia	1:53.89; GR	Mollie O'Callaghan; Australia	1:54.01	Madison Wilson; Australia	1:56.17
400 metre freestyle	Ariarne Titmus; Australia	3:58.06; GR	Summer McIntosh; Canada	3:59.32; NR	Kiah Melverton; Australia	4:03.12
800 metre freestyle	Ariarne Titmus; Australia	8:13.59; CR, OC	Kiah Melverton; Australia	8:16.79	Lani Pallister; Australia	8:19.16
50 metre backstroke	Kylie Masse; Canada	27.31; GR	Mollie O'Callaghan; Australia	27.47	Kaylee McKeown; Australia	27.58
100 metre backstroke	Kaylee McKeown; Australia	58.60; GR	Kylie Masse; Canada	58.73	Medi Harris; Wales	59.62
200 metre backstroke	Kaylee McKeown; Australia	2:05.60; GR	Kylie Masse; Canada	2:07.81	Katie Shanahan; Scotland	2:09.22
50 metre breaststroke	Lara van Niekerk; South Africa	29.73; GR	Imogen Clark; England	30.02; NR	Chelsea Hodges; Australia	30.05; OC
100 metre breaststroke	Lara van Niekerk; South Africa	1:05.47	Tatjana Schoenmaker; South Africa	1:06.68	Chelsea Hodges; Australia	1:07.05
200 metre breaststroke	Tatjana Schoenmaker; South Africa	2:21.92	Jenna Strauch; Australia	2:23.65	Kaylene Corbett; South Africa	2:23.67
50 metre butterfly	Emma McKeon; Australia	25.90	Erin Gallagher; South Africa Holly Barratt; Australia	26.05	Not awarded as there was a tie for silver.	
100 metre butterfly	Maggie Mac Neil; Canada	56.36; GR	Emma McKeon; Australia	56.38	Brianna Throssell; Australia	57.50
200 metre butterfly	Elizabeth Dekkers; Australia	2:07.28	Laura Stephens; England	2:07.90	Brianna Throssell; Australia	2:08.32
200 metre individual medley	Summer McIntosh; Canada	2:08.70; WJ	Kaylee McKeown; Australia	2:09.52	Abbie Wood; England	2:10.68
400 metre individual medley	Summer McIntosh; Canada	4:29.01; WJ, CR, AM	Kiah Melverton; Australia	4:36.78	Katie Shanahan; Scotland	4:39.37
4 × 100 metre freestyle relay	Australia; Madison Wilson (53.22); Shayna Jack (52.72); Mollie O'Callaghan (52.66); Emma McKeon (52.04)	3:30.64	England; Anna Hopkin (53.81); Abbie Wood (54.28); Isabella Hindley (55.10); Freya Anderson (53.43)	3:36.62	Canada; Summer McIntosh (54.62); Katerine Savard (54.44); Rebecca Smith (55.08); Maggie Mac Neil (53.11)	3:37.25
4 × 200 metre freestyle relay	Australia; Madison Wilson (1:56.27); Kiah Melverton (1:55.40); Mollie O'Callaghan (1:54.80); Ariarne Titmus (1:52.82)	7:39.29; WR	Canada; Summer McIntosh (1:55.24); Ella Jansen (1:57.83); Mary-Sophie Harvey (1:59.65); Katerine Savard (1:59.28)	7:51.98	England; Freya Colbert (1:57.85); Tamryn van Selm (2:02.60); Abbie Wood (1:58.99); Freya Anderson (1:57.67)	7:57.11
4 × 100 metre medley relay	Australia; Kaylee McKeown (58.79); Chelsea Hodges (1:06.68); Emma McKeon (56.59); Mollie O'Callaghan (52.38)	3:54.44	Canada; Kylie Masse (59.01); Sophie Angus (1:07.66); Maggie Mac Neil (56.59); Summer McIntosh (53.33)	3:56.59	England; Lauren Cox (1:00.72); Molly Renshaw (1:06.61); Laura Stephens (58.96); Anna Hopkin (53.15)	3:59.44

==== Parasport ====
Event	Gold		Silver		Bronze	
50 metre freestyle S13	Katja Dedekind; Australia	26.56; WR	Hannah Russell; England	27.67	Kirralee Hayes; Australia	28.24
100 metre freestyle S9	Sophie Pascoe; New Zealand	1:02.95	Emily Beecroft; Australia	1:03.74	Toni Shaw; Scotland	1:03.75
200 metre freestyle S14	Bethany Firth; Northern Ireland	2:07.02	Jessica-Jane Applegate; England	2:08.58	Louise Fiddes; England	2:11.22
100 metre backstroke S8	Alice Tai; England	1:13.64	Tupou Neiufi; New Zealand	1:17.91	Lily Rice; Wales	1:23.06
100 metre breaststroke SB6	Maisie Summers-Newton; England	1:32.72	Grace Harvey; England	1:43.29	Camille Bérubé; Canada	1:43.81
200 metre individual medley SM10	Jasmine Greenwood; Australia	2:33.29	Aurélie Rivard; Canada	2:34.26	Keira Stephens; Australia	2:36.68

==== Mixed ====
Event	Gold		Silver		Bronze	
4 × 100 metre freestyle relay	Australia; William Yang (48.80); Kyle Chalmers (47.55); Mollie O'Callaghan (52.62); Emma McKeon (52.21); Flynn Southam^{[a]} Zac Incerti^{[a]} Meg Harris^{[a]} Madison Wilson^{[a]}	3:21.18; GR	England; Lewis Burras (48.28); Tom Dean (48.12); Anna Hopkin (53.27); Freya Anderson (52.78); Edward Mildred^{[a]} Jacob Whittle^{[a]} Isabella Hindley^{[a]} Abbie Wood^{[a]}	3:22.45	Canada; Javier Acevedo (49.05); Joshua Liendo (47.89); Rebecca Smith (54.41); Maggie Mac Neil (53.51); Ruslan Gaziev^{[a]} Stephen Calkins^{[a]} Ella Jansen^{[a]} Mary-Sophie Harvey^{[a]}	3:24.86
4 × 100 metre medley relay	Australia; Kaylee McKeown (59.01); Zac Stubblety-Cook (59.52); Matthew Temple (50.89); Emma McKeon (51.88); Mitch Larkin^{[a]} Samuel Williamson^{[a]} Alex Perkins^{[a]} Madison Wilson^{[a]}	3:41.30; GR	Canada; Kylie Masse (59.11); James Dergousoff (1:00.57); Maggie Mac Neil (56.50); Ruslan Gaziev (47.80); Javier Acevedo^{[a]} Sophie Angus^{[a]} Patrick Hussey^{[a]} Rebecca Smith^{[a]}	3:43.98	England; Lauren Cox (1:00.81); James Wilby (58.94); James Guy (51.19); Freya Anderson (53.09); Alicia Wilson^{[a]} Greg Butler^{[a]} Edward Mildred^{[a]} Abbie Wood^{[a]}	3:44.03

^{a} Swimmers who participated in the heats only and received medals.

== Participating nations ==
There were 57 participating Commonwealth Games Associations (CGA's) in swimming with a total of 449 (246 men and 203 women) athletes. The number of athletes a nation entered is in parentheses beside the name of the country. This marked Dominica's sport debut in the sport at the Commonwealth Games.

- Anguilla (1)
- Antigua and Barbuda (4)
- Australia (74)
- Bahamas (8)
- Bangladesh (5)
- Barbados (5)
- Bermuda (3)
- Botswana (3)
- Cameroon (2)
- Canada (28)
- Cayman Islands (5)
- Cook Islands (4)
- Cyprus (6)
- Dominica (1)
- England (47)
- Eswatini (2)
- Fiji (8)
- The Gambia (2)
- Ghana (5)
- Gibraltar (5)
- Grenada (2)
- Guernsey (8)
- Guyana (4)
- India (7)
- Isle of Man (7)
- Jamaica (7)
- Jersey (7)
- Kenya (4)
- Malawi (2)
- Malaysia (4)
- Maldives (5)
- Mauritius (4)
- Mozambique (2)
- Namibia (2)
- New Zealand (12)
- Northern Ireland (10)
- Pakistan (4)
- Papua New Guinea (2)
- Rwanda (2)
- Saint Helena (7)
- Saint Lucia (2)
- Saint Vincent and the Grenadines (6)
- Samoa (4)
- Scotland (26)
- Seychelles (6)
- Sierra Leone (4)
- Singapore (11)
- Solomon Islands (3)
- South Africa (22)
- Sri Lanka (2)
- Tanzania (2)
- Tonga (4)
- Trinidad and Tobago (6)
- Turks and Caicos Islands (2)
- Uganda (5)
- Wales (13)
- Zambia (4)
