= Swimming at the 2022 Commonwealth Games – Men's 100 metre freestyle =

Men's 100 metre freestyle at the 2022 Commonwealth Games
- Venue: Sandwell Aquatics Centre
- Dates: 31 July (heats, semifinals); 1 August (final)
- Competitors: 69 from 44 nations
- Winning time: 47.51

Medalists
| gold medal | Kyle Chalmers | Australia |
| silver medal | Tom Dean | England |
| bronze medal | Duncan Scott | Scotland |

The men's 100 metre freestyle event at the 2022 Commonwealth Games will be held on 31 July and 1 August at the Sandwell Aquatics Centre.

== Records ==
Prior to this competition, the existing world, Commonwealth and Games records were as follows:

| World record | César Cielo (BRA) | 46.91 | Rome, Italy | 30 July 2009 |
| Commonwealth record | Cameron McEvoy (AUS) | 47.04 | Adelaide, Australia | 11 April 2016 |
| Games record | Brent Hayden (CAN) | 47.98 | Delhi, India | 7 October 2010 |

The following records were established during the competition:

| Date | Event | Name | Nationality | Time | Record |
|---|---|---|---|---|---|
| 31 July | Semifinal 1 | Kyle Chalmers | Australia | 47.36 | GR |

== Schedule ==
The schedule is as follows:

All times are British Summer Time (UTC+1)

| Date | Time | Round |
|---|---|---|
| Sunday 31 July 2022 | 11:18 | Qualifying |
| Sunday 31 July 2022 | 20:11 | Semifinals |
| Monday 30 July 2022 | 19:07 | Final |

== Results ==
=== Heats ===
| Rank | Heat | Lane | Name | Nationality | Time | Notes |
|---|---|---|---|---|---|---|
| 1 | 8 | 4 | Joshua Liendo | Canada | 48.54 | Q |
| 2 | 8 | 5 | Tom Dean | England | 48.61 | Q |
| 3 | 7 | 3 | Ruslan Gaziev | Canada | 48.84 | Q |
| 4 | 8 | 6 | Zac Incerti | Australia | 48.84 | Q |
| 5 | 9 | 1 | Stephen Calkins | Canada | 48.96 | Q |
| 6 | 9 | 4 | Kyle Chalmers | Australia | 48.98 | Q |
| 7 | 9 | 3 | Matt Richards | Wales | 49.19 | Q |
| 8 | 7 | 5 | Jacob Whittle | England | 49.26 | Q |
| 9 | 9 | 5 | Duncan Scott | Scotland | 49.31 | Q |
| 10 | 9 | 6 | William Yang | Australia | 49.49 | Q |
| 11 | 8 | 2 | Jack McMillan | Northern Ireland | 49.61 | Q |
| 12 | 7 | 4 | Lewis Burras | England | 49.70 | Q |
| 13 | 9 | 2 | Jonathan Tan | Singapore | 49.85 | Q |
| 14 | 8 | 1 | Mikkel Lee | Singapore | 50.21 | Q |
| 14 | 8 | 7 | Cameron Gray | New Zealand | 50.21 | Q |
| 16 | 9 | 8 | Pieter Coetze | South Africa | 50.33 | WD |
| 17 | 8 | 3 | Xander Skinner | Namibia | 50.40 | R, Q, NR |
| 18 | 7 | 1 | Khiew Hoe Yean | Malaysia | 50.47 | R |
| 19 | 7 | 7 | Guy Brooks | South Africa | 50.68 | |
| 20 | 8 | 8 | Wesley Roberts | Cook Islands | 50.75 | |
| 21 | 6 | 1 | Arvin Chahal | Malaysia | 50.84 | |
| 22 | 6 | 5 | Joel Watterson | Isle of Man | 50.98 | |
| 23 | 6 | 4 | Lamar Taylor | Bahamas | 51.10 | |
| 24 | 7 | 8 | Bradley Vincent | Mauritius | 51.29 | |
| 25 | 4 | 2 | James Freeman | Botswana | 51.37 | |
| 26 | 9 | 7 | Darren Chua | Singapore | 51.38 | |
| 27 | 5 | 5 | Stefano Mitchell | Antigua and Barbuda | 51.42 | |
| 28 | 5 | 8 | Hansel McCaig | Fiji | 51.78 | |
| 29 | 5 | 4 | Alex Bregazzi | Isle of Man | 51.82 | |
| 30 | 5 | 3 | Harry Robinson | Isle of Man | 51.98 | |
| 31 | 4 | 4 | David Young | Fiji | 52.47 | |
| 32 | 6 | 6 | Ollie Brehaut | Jersey | 52.52 | |
| 33 | 3 | 6 | Collins Saliboko | Tanzania | 52.54 | |
| 34 | 2 | 2 | Adam Moncherry | Seychelles | 52.59 | |
| 35 | 5 | 7 | Nathaniel Thomas | Jamaica | 52.64 | |
| 36 | 4 | 7 | Matthew Lawrence | Mozambique | 52.70 | |
| 37 | 6 | 2 | Gregory Anodin | Mauritius | 52.76 | |
| 38 | 5 | 2 | Ridhwan Mohamed | Kenya | 52.81 | |
| 39 | 4 | 3 | Tendo Mukalazi | Uganda | 52.91 | NR |
| 40 | 6 | 7 | Jayhan Odlum-Smith | Saint Lucia | 53.04 | |
| 41 | 5 | 1 | James Allison | Cayman Islands | 53.08 | |
| 42 | 6 | 8 | Brandon Schuster | Samoa | 53.17 | |
| 43 | 4 | 6 | Christos Manoli | Cyprus | 53.18 | |
| 44 | 5 | 6 | Sidrell Williams | Jamaica | 53.54 | |
| 45 | 3 | 7 | Warren Lawrence | Dominica | 53.59 | |
| 46 | 6 | 3 | Mathieu Bachmann | Seychelles | 53.72 | |
| 47 | 3 | 4 | Tyler Fred | Seychelles | 53.79 | |
| 48 | 3 | 5 | Monyo Maina | Kenya | 53.96 | |
| 49 | 3 | 3 | Atuhaire Ambala | Uganda | 54.04 | |
| 50 | 4 | 5 | Md Asif Reza | Bangladesh | 54.24 | |
| 51 | 3 | 8 | Finau Ohuafi | Tonga | 54.51 | |
| 52 | 2 | 4 | Jack Allan | Jersey | 54.67 | |
| 53 | 2 | 7 | Paul Mahaica | Guyana | 54.79 | |
| 54 | 2 | 3 | Kenale Alleyne | Saint Vincent and the Grenadines | 54.80 | |
| 55 | 4 | 8 | Jonathan Beck | Guernsey | 54.94 | |
| 56 | 4 | 1 | Shane Cadogan | Saint Vincent and the Grenadines | 54.95 | |
| 57 | 2 | 6 | Zackary Gresham | Grenada | 55.07 | |
| 58 | 3 | 1 | Mohamed Aan Hussain | Maldives | 55.49 | |
| 59 | 2 | 5 | Matt Savitz | Gibraltar | 55.53 | |
| 60 | 3 | 2 | Epeli Rabua | Fiji | 55.83 | |
| 61 | 2 | 1 | Kow Jackson | Ghana | 56.27 | |
| 62 | 1 | 5 | Rohan Karim Shearer | Turks and Caicos Islands | 56.78 | |
| 63 | 2 | 8 | Eloi Maniraguha | Rwanda | 57.79 | |
| 64 | 1 | 4 | Sekhel Tzedeq | Guyana | 58.03 | |
| 65 | 1 | 6 | Stefan Thomas | Saint Helena | 58.98 | |
| 66 | 1 | 3 | Alex Lake | Anguilla | 1:00.36 | |
| 67 | 1 | 2 | William Caswell | Saint Helena | 1:01.74 | |
| 68 | 1 | 7 | Ebrima Buaro | The Gambia | 1:05.15 | |
| 69 | 1 | 1 | Omar Darboe | The Gambia | 1:06.44 | |
| | 7 | 2 | Dan Jones | Wales | DNS | |
| | 7 | 6 | Matthew Sates | South Africa | DNS | |

=== Semifinals ===
| Rank | Heat | Lane | Name | Nationality | Time | Notes |
|---|---|---|---|---|---|---|
| 1 | 1 | 3 | Kyle Chalmers | Australia | 47.36 | Q, GR |
| 2 | 1 | 4 | Tom Dean | England | 47.83 | Q |
| 3 | 1 | 2 | William Yang | Australia | 48.38 | Q |
| 4 | 2 | 5 | Ruslan Gaziev | Canada | 48.54 | Q |
| 5 | 2 | 4 | Joshua Liendo | Canada | 48.78 | Q |
| 6 | 2 | 2 | Duncan Scott | Scotland | 48.78 | Q |
| 7 | 1 | 6 | Jacob Whittle | England | 48.82 | Q |
| 8 | 1 | 5 | Zac Incerti | Australia | 48.91 | Q |
| 9 | 2 | 6 | Matt Richards | Wales | 49.13 | R |
| 10 | 2 | 3 | Stephen Calkins | Canada | 49.42 | R |
| 11 | 2 | 7 | Jack McMillan | Northern Ireland | 49.69 | |
| 12 | 2 | 8 | Cameron Gray | New Zealand | 49.89 | |
| 13 | 1 | 7 | Lewis Burras | England | 49.96 | |
| 14 | 2 | 1 | Jonathan Tan | Singapore | 50.03 | |
| 15 | 1 | 8 | Xander Skinner | Namibia | 50.06 | NR |
| 16 | 1 | 1 | Mikkel Lee | Singapore | 50.30 | |

=== Final ===
| Rank | Lane | Name | Nationality | Time | Notes |
|---|---|---|---|---|---|
| 1st place, gold medalist(s) | 4 | Kyle Chalmers | Australia | 47.51 | |
| 2nd place, silver medalist(s) | 5 | Tom Dean | England | 47.89 | |
| 3rd place, bronze medalist(s) | 7 | Duncan Scott | Scotland | 48.27 | |
| 4 | 6 | Ruslan Gaziev | Canada | 48.54 | |
| 5 | 3 | William Yang | Australia | 48.55 | |
| 6 | 1 | Jacob Whittle | England | 48.61 | |
| 7 | 2 | Joshua Liendo | Canada | 48.66 | |
| 8 | 8 | Zac Incerti | Australia | 49.09 | |
