= Swimming at the 2022 World Aquatics Championships – Men's 4 × 100 metre freestyle relay =

Men's 4 × 100 metre freestyle relay at the 2022 World Aquatics Championships
- Venue: Danube Arena
- Location: Budapest, Hungary
- Dates: 18 June (heats and final)
- Competitors: 74 from 18 nations
- Teams: 18
- Winning time: 3:09.34

Medalists
gold medal	Caeleb Dressel; Ryan Held; Justin Ress; Brooks Curry; Hunter Armstrong	United States
silver medal	William Yang; Matthew Temple; Jack Cartwright; Kyle Chalmers	Australia
bronze medal	Alessandro Miressi; Thomas Ceccon; Lorenzo Zazzeri; Manuel Frigo	Italy

The Men's 4 × 100 metre freestyle relay competition at the 2022 World Aquatics Championships was held on 18 June 2022.

== Records ==
Prior to the competition, the existing world and championship records were as follows.

World record	United States	3:08.24	Beijing, China	11 August 2008
Competition record	United States	3:09.06	Gwangju, South Korea	21 July 2019

== Results ==
=== Heats ===
The heats were started at 11:29.

Rank	Heat	Lane	Nation	Swimmers	Time	Notes
1	2	4	United States	Hunter Armstrong (48.34); Ryan Held (47.13); Justin Ress (47.57); Brooks Curry (47.76)	3:10.80	Q
2	2	5	Australia	William Yang (48.63); Matthew Temple (48.40); Jack Cartwright (47.83); Kyle Chalmers (47.11)	3:11.97	Q
3	2	3	Hungary	Szebasztián Szabó (48.61); Kristóf Milák (47.36); Richárd Bohus (48.71); Nándor Németh (47.70)	3:12.38	Q
4	1	3	Great Britain	Lewis Burras (48.69); James Guy (48.29); Matt Richards (47.99); Jacob Whittle (47.58)	3:12.55	Q
5	1	5	Canada	Ruslan Gaziev (48.78); Yuri Kisil (48.75); Javier Acevedo (48.27); Joshua Liendo (47.28)	3:13.08	Q
6	1	4	Italy	Alessandro Miressi (48.32); Thomas Ceccon (49.00); Lorenzo Zazzeri (47.95); Manuel Frigo (47.86)	3:13.13	Q
7	2	6	Brazil	Gabriel Santos (49.04); Marcelo Chierighini (48.07); Felipe Souza (48.74); Vinicius Assunção (47.91)	3:13.76	Q
8	2	2	Serbia	Velimir Stjepanović (48.98); Uroš Nikolić (48.93); Andrej Barna (47.25); Nikola Aćin (49.10)	3:14.26	Q
9	2	7	Israel	Tomer Frankel (49.08); Gal Cohen Groumi (48.28); Denis Loktev (48.86); Meiron Cheruti (49.13)	3:15.35	NR
10	2	8	China	Yang Jintong (49.39); Hou Yujie (50.07); Hong Jinquan (48.28); Pan Zhanle (47.65)	3:15.39	
11	1	2	Sweden	Björn Seeliger (49.06); Isak Eliasson (48.46); Robin Hanson (48.45); Elias Persson (49.49)	3:15.46	
12	1	8	South Korea	Hwang Sun-woo (48.07); Lee Yoo-yeon (49.09); Kim Ji-hun (49.23); Kim Min-joon (49.29)	3:15.68	NR
13	1	6	Greece	Odysseus Meladinis (49.34); Stergios Bilas (48.87); Evangelos Makrygiannis (49.88); Dimitrios Markos (49.74)	3:17.83	
14	1	0	Singapore	Quah Zheng Wen (49.25); Jonathan Tan (49.08); Mikkel Lee (49.99); Darren Chua (50.44)	3:18.76	
15	1	7	Egypt	Youssef Ramadan (48.90 NR); Marwan Elkamash (50.08); Abdelrahman Sameh (50.88); Mohamed Samy (49.60)	3:19.46	
16	1	1	Thailand	Dulyawat Kaewsriyong (50.67); Tonnam Kanteemool (51.95); Ratthawit Thammananthachote (53.19); Navaphat Wongcharoen (51.04)	3:26.85	
17	2	1	Vietnam	Trần Hưng Nguyên (51.85); Hồ Nguyễn Duy Khoa (53.47); Hoàng Quý Phước (50.56); Nguyễn Hữu Kim Sơn (52.32)	3:28.20	
—	2	0	Hong Kong	Nicholas Lim (52.08); Ian Ho; Lau Shiu Yue; Cheuk Ming Ho	DSQ	

=== Final ===
The final was held at 19:36.

Rank	Lane	Nation	Swimmers	Time	Notes
1st place, gold medalist(s)	4	United States	Caeleb Dressel (47.67); Ryan Held (46.99); Justin Ress (47.48); Brooks Curry (47.20)	3:09.34	
2nd place, silver medalist(s)	5	Australia	William Yang (48.41); Matthew Temple (48.17); Jack Cartwright (47.62); Kyle Chalmers (46.60)	3:10.80	
3rd place, bronze medalist(s)	7	Italy	Alessandro Miressi (48.38); Thomas Ceccon (47.57); Lorenzo Zazzeri (47.35); Manuel Frigo (47.65)	3:10.95	
4	6	Great Britain	Lewis Burras (48.09); Jacob Whittle (47.91); Matt Richards (48.19); Tom Dean (46.95)	3:11.14	NR
5	3	Hungary	Nándor Németh (47.97); Szebasztián Szabó (47.37); Richárd Bohus (49.01); Kristóf Milák (46.89)	3:11.24	
6	2	Canada	Joshua Liendo (47.87); Ruslan Gaziev (48.02); Javier Acevedo (47.97); Yuri Kisil (48.13)	3:11.99	
7	1	Brazil	Gabriel Santos (48.63); Marcelo Chierighini (47.77); Felipe Souza (48.18); Vinicius Assunção (47.63)	3:12.21	
8	8	Serbia	Velimir Stjepanović (48.99); Andrej Barna (47.06); Uroš Nikolić (48.65); Nikola Aćin (49.13)	3:13.83	
