= Swimming at the 2022 World Aquatics Championships – 4 × 100 metre mixed freestyle relay =

4 × 100 metre mixed freestyle relay at the 2022 World Aquatics Championships
- Venue: Danube Arena
- Location: Budapest, Hungary
- Dates: 24 June (heats and final)
- Competitors: 122 from 27 nations
- Teams: 27
- Winning time: 3:19.38 WR

Medalists
gold medal	Jack Cartwright; Kyle Chalmers; Madison Wilson; Mollie O'Callaghan; Zac Incerti; William Yang; Meg Harris; Leah Neale	Australia
silver medal	Joshua Liendo; Javier Acevedo; Kayla Sanchez; Penny Oleksiak; Ruslan Gaziev; Taylor Ruck; Maggie Mac Neil	Canada
bronze medal	Ryan Held; Brooks Curry; Torri Huske; Claire Curzan; Drew Kibler; Erika Brown; Kate Douglass	United States

The 4 × 100 metre mixed freestyle relay competition at the 2022 World Aquatics Championships was held on 24 June 2022.

== Records ==
Prior to the competition, the existing world and championship records were as follows.

World record	United States	3:19.40	Gwangju, South Korea	27 July 2019
Competition record	United States	3:19.40	Gwangju, South Korea	27 July 2019

The following new records were set during this competition.

Date	Event	Nationality	Time	Record
24 June	Final	Australia	3:19.38	WR

== Results ==
=== Heats ===
The heats were started at 09:53.

Rank	Heat	Lane	Nation	Swimmers	Time	Notes
1	2	0	United States	Ryan Held (47.85); Drew Kibler (48.26); Erika Brown (53.73); Kate Douglass (54.64)	3:24.48	Q
2	2	9	Canada	Ruslan Gaziev (49.16); Javier Acevedo (48.34); Taylor Ruck (53.92); Maggie Mac Neil (53.88)	3:25.30	Q
3	3	0	Australia	Zac Incerti (49.28); William Yang (48.39); Meg Harris (53.97); Leah Neale (53.91)	3:25.55	Q
4	2	4	Netherlands	Stan Pijnenburg (48.79); Jesse Puts (48.54); Tessa Giele (55.47); Marrit Steenbergen (53.06)	3:25.86	Q
5	3	5	Italy	Leonardo Deplano (48.92); Alessandro Miressi (48.16); Silvia Di Pietro (54.62); Chiara Tarantino (54.30)	3:26.00	Q
6	3	4	Great Britain	Jacob Whittle (49.04); Matt Richards (48.57); Freya Anderson (54.03); Lucy Hope (54.46)	3:26.10	Q
7	3	3	Brazil	Vinicius Assunção (48.95); Gabriel Santos (48.70); Stephanie Balduccini (54.29); Giovanna Diamante (54.37)	3:26.31	Q
8	3	1	China	Hong Jinquan (49.26); Wang Changhao (49.20); Lao Lihui (54.40); Ai Yanhan (54.34)	3:27.20	Q
9	1	1	New Zealand	Lewis Clareburt (49.55); Carter Swift (48.39); Chelsey Edwards (55.39); Laura Littlejohn (54.58)	3:27.91	NR
10	2	5	Sweden	Robin Hanson (49.31); Isak Eliasson (48.78); Sofia Åstedt (55.71); Sara Junevik (55.23)	3:29.03	
11	3	8	South Korea	Hwang Sun-woo (49.18); Lee Yoo-yeon (49.64); Jeong So-eun (55.42); Hur Yeon-kyung (55.11)	3:29.35	NR
12	1	2	Israel	Tomer Frankel (49.45); Ron Polonsky (48.92); Lea Polonsky (56.59); Daria Golovaty (55.28)	3:30.24	
13	1	6	Singapore	Jonathan Tan (49.72); Ardi Mohamed Azman (50.46); Quah Jing Wen (56.21); Amanda Lim (56.74)	3:33.13	
14	2	3	Greece	Stergios Bilas (49.80); Odysseus Meladinis (49.30); Maria Drasidou (58.36); Anna Ntountounaki (56.95)	3:34.41	
15	1	5	Chinese Taipei	Wang Kuan-hung (50.49); Wang Hsing-hao (50.08); Hsu An (57.08); Huang Mei-chien (57.03)	3:34.68	NR
16	3	9	Hong Kong	Ian Ho (50.12); Nicholas Lim (51.30); Camille Cheng (56.67); Chloe Cheng (57.17)	3:35.26	
17	1	7	Latvia	Ģirts Feldbergs (51.95); Daniils Bobrovs (53.72); Ieva Maļuka (55.78); Gabriela Ņikitina (56.78)	3:38.23	
18	1	8	Thailand	Dulyawat Kaewsriyong (51.71); Navaphat Wongcharoen (51.84); Jinjutha Pholjamjumrus (58.05); Jenjira Srisaard (1:01.73)	3:43.33	
18	3	2	Morocco	Samy Boutouil (50.42); Souhail Hamouchane (52.76); Lina Khiyara (1:00.53); Imane El Barodi (59.62)	3:43.33	
20	1	4	Vietnam	Nguyễn Quang Thuấn (52.06); Nguyễn Hữu Kim Sơn (52.12); Võ Thị Mỹ Tiên (1:00.62); Lê Thị Thảo My (1:01.08)	3:45.88	
21	1	3	Seychelles	Mathieu Bachmann (53.54); Therese Soukup (1:02.27); Simon Bachmann (53.91); Khema Elizabeth (1:03.53)	3:53.25	
22	2	8	Mongolia	Batbayaryn Enkhkhüslen (59.59); Batbayaryn Enkhtamir (52.94); Enkh-Amgalangiin Ariuntamir (1:04.74); Zandanbal Gunsennorov (56.69)	3:53.96	
23	2	2	Uganda	Adnan Kabuye (56.00); Kirabo Namutebi (1:03.73); Tendo Mukalazi (53.16); Avice Meya (1:03.15)	3:56.04	
24	1	0	Guam	Israel Poppe (56.29); Mia Lee (1:03.46); Keana Santos (1:09.57); Benjamin Ko (56.89)	4:06.21	
25	1	9	Northern Mariana Islands	Taiyo Akimaru (57.63); Maria Batallones (1:06.75); Jinie Thompson (1:10.06); Juhn Tenorio (58.51)	4:12.95	
26	2	1	Maldives	Mohamed Aan Hussain (56.96); Aishath Sausan (1:10.71); Hamna Ahmed (1:13.88); Mubal Azzam Ibrahim (56.89)	4:18.44	
	3	7	Tanzania	Dennis Mhini (59.10); Eunike Fugo (1:15.13; Kayla Temba (1:23.02); Collins Saliboko	Disqualified	
	2	6	Bahamas		Did not start	
	2	7	France		Did not start	
	3	6	Angola		Did not start	

=== Final ===
The final was held at 19:49.

Rank	Lane	Nation	Swimmers	Time	Notes
1st place, gold medalist(s)	3	Australia	Jack Cartwright (48.12); Kyle Chalmers (46.98); Madison Wilson (52.25); Mollie O'Callaghan (52.03)	3:19.38	WR
2nd place, silver medalist(s)	5	Canada	Joshua Liendo (48.02); Javier Acevedo (47.96); Kayla Sanchez (52.52); Penny Oleksiak (52.11)	3:20.61	NR
3rd place, bronze medalist(s)	4	United States	Ryan Held (47.93); Brooks Curry (47.72); Torri Huske (52.70); Claire Curzan (52.84)	3:21.09	
4	7	Great Britain	Tom Dean (48.25); Lewis Burras (47.86); Anna Hopkin (53.27); Freya Anderson (53.06)	3:22.44	
5	6	Netherlands	Stan Pijnenburg (48.80); Jesse Puts (48.29); Tessa Giele (54.58); Marrit Steenbergen (52.57)	3:24.24	
6	1	Brazil	Gabriel Santos (48.73); Vinicius Assunção (48.03); Giovanna Diamante (53.98); Stephanie Balduccini (54.04)	3:24.78	SA
7	2	Italy	Lorenzo Zazzeri (48.69); Alessandro Miressi (47.50); Silvia Di Pietro (54.19); Chiara Tarantino (55.45)	3:25.83	
8	8	China	Hong Jinquan (48.88); Wang Changhao (48.86); Lao Lihui (54.60); Ai Yanhan (54.58)	3:26.92	
