= 2021 FINA World Swimming Championships (25 m) – Men's 100 metre freestyle =

Swimming competition

Men's 100 metre freestyle at the 2021 FINA World Swimming Championships (25 m)
- Venue: Etihad Arena
- Location: Abu Dhabi, United Arab Emirates
- Dates: 20 December (heats and semifinals); 21 December (final)
- Competitors: 100 from 95 nations
- Winning time: 45.57

Medalists
| gold medal | Alessandro Miressi | Italy |
| silver medal | Ryan Held | United States |
| bronze medal | Joshua Liendo | Canada |

The Men's 100 metre freestyle competition of the 2021 FINA World Swimming Championships (25 m) was held on 20 and 21 December 2021.

== Records ==
Prior to the competition, the existing world and championship records were as follows.

| World record | Kyle Chalmers (AUS) | 44.84 | Kazan, Russia | 29 October 2021 |
| Competition record | Vladimir Morozov (RUS) | 45.51 | Doha, Qatar | 3 December 2014 |

== Results ==
=== Heats ===
The heats were started on 20 December at 10:26.

| Rank | Heat | Lane | Name | Nationality | Time | Notes |
|---|---|---|---|---|---|---|
| 1 | 10 | 9 | Joshua Liendo | Canada | 46.26 | Q |
| 2 | 10 | 4 | Alessandro Miressi | Italy | 46.30 | Q |
| 3 | 12 | 5 | Vladislav Grinev | Russian Swimming Federation | 46.32 | Q |
| 4 | 11 | 5 | Maxime Grousset | France | 46.52 | Q |
| 5 | 12 | 1 | Ryan Held | United States | 46.72 | Q |
| 6 | 9 | 1 | Pan Zhanle | China | 46.92 | Q |
| 7 | 10 | 2 | Gabriel Santos | Brazil | 46.95 | Q |
| 8 | 6 | 4 | Youssef Ramadan | Egypt | 46.98 | Q, NR |
| 9 | 12 | 0 | Jack McMillan | Ireland | 47.04 | Q |
| 10 | 11 | 4 | Zach Apple | United States | 47.05 | Q |
| 11 | 10 | 7 | Heiko Gigler | Austria | 47.07 | Q |
| 12 | 12 | 8 | Daniel Zaitsev | Estonia | 47.08 | Q, NR |
| 13 | 12 | 3 | Stan Pijnenburg | Netherlands | 47.13 | Q |
| 14 | 12 | 4 | Kliment Kolesnikov | Russian Swimming Federation | 47.19 | Q, WD |
| 15 | 10 | 5 | Lorenzo Zazzeri | Italy | 47.27 | Q |
| 16 | 10 | 3 | Hwang Sun-woo | South Korea | 47.31 | Q |
| 17 | 8 | 7 | Mikel Schreuders | Aruba | 47.36 | Q, NR |
| 18 | 8 | 6 | Nikola Miljenić | Croatia | 47.37 | |
| 19 | 10 | 1 | Velimir Stjepanović | Serbia | 47.51 | |
| 19 | 11 | 9 | Miguel Nascimento | Portugal | 47.51 | |
| 21 | 11 | 7 | Jasper Aerents | Belgium | 47.67 | |
| 22 | 9 | 4 | Roman Mityukov | Switzerland | 47.77 | |
| 23 | 11 | 8 | Chad le Clos | South Africa | 47.83 | |
| 24 | 9 | 2 | Denis Loktev | Israel | 47.86 | |
| 25 | 10 | 0 | Nicholas Lia | Norway | 47.92 | |
| 26 | 12 | 6 | Jesse Puts | Netherlands | 47.97 | |
| 27 | 11 | 6 | Simonas Bilis | Lithuania | 48.11 | |
| 28 | 10 | 8 | Jakub Majerski | Poland | 48.25 | |
| 29 | 8 | 4 | Ben Hockin | Paraguay | 48.35 | |
| 30 | 9 | 6 | Emir Muratović | Bosnia and Herzegovina | 48.38 | |
| 31 | 6 | 5 | Xander Skinner | Namibia | 48.40 | NR |
| 32 | 12 | 9 | Artur Barseghyan | Armenia | 48.42 | |
| 33 | 7 | 9 | Aleksey Tarasenko | Uzbekistan | 48.45 | NR |
| 34 | 11 | 0 | Guido Buscaglia | Argentina | 48.52 | |
| 35 | 7 | 0 | George Stoica-Constantin | Romania | 48.59 | |
| 36 | 7 | 4 | Kaloyan Bratanov | Bulgaria | 48.62 | |
| 36 | 11 | 1 | Oussama Sahnoune | Algeria | 48.62 | |
| 38 | 7 | 2 | Srihari Nataraj | India | 48.65 | NR |
| 39 | 10 | 6 | Sergii Shevtsov | Ukraine | 48.77 | |
| 40 | 9 | 0 | Ralph Daleiden Ciuferri | Luxembourg | 48.80 | |
| 41 | 7 | 5 | Alex Sobers | Barbados | 48.83 | NR |
| 42 | 8 | 0 | Samy Boutouil | Morocco | 48.88 | NR |
| 43 | 9 | 7 | Yang Jintong | China | 48.92 | |
| 44 | 6 | 1 | Louis Ortiz | Puerto Rico | 49.06 | |
| 45 | 7 | 8 | Nikolas Antoniou | Cyprus | 49.15 | NR |
| 46 | 6 | 7 | Stefano Mitchell | Antigua and Barbuda | 49.21 | NR |
| 47 | 8 | 2 | Alberto Mestre | Venezuela | 49.34 | |
| 48 | 8 | 3 | Cheuk Ming Ho | Hong Kong | 49.39 | |
| 49 | 6 | 3 | Lamar Taylor | Bahamas | 49.52 | NR |
| 50 | 7 | 3 | Constantin Malachi | Moldova | 49.83 | |
| 51 | 8 | 5 | Yousuf Al-Matrooshi | United Arab Emirates | 50.06 | |
| 52 | 5 | 5 | Jayhan Odlum-Smith | Saint Lucia | 50.12 | NR |
| 53 | 6 | 0 | Denzel González | Dominican Republic | 50.13 | NR |
| 54 | 8 | 8 | Alaa Masoo | FINA Refugee Team | 50.16 | |
| 55 | 8 | 9 | Supha Sangaworawong | Thailand | 50.20 | |
| 56 | 5 | 4 | Kledi Kadiu | Albania | 50.22 | |
| 57 | 6 | 9 | Gregory Anodin | Mauritius | 50.27 | |
| 58 | 8 | 1 | Luka Kukhalashvili | Georgia | 50.39 | |
| 59 | 1 | 6 | Seggio Bernardina | Curaçao | 50.40 | |
| 60 | 2 | 1 | Mohammed Bedour | Jordan | 50.44 | |
| 61 | 7 | 1 | Alexander Varakin | Kazakhstan | 50.52 | |
| 62 | 5 | 9 | Nixon Hernández | El Salvador | 50.79 | |
| 63 | 5 | 0 | Adama Niane | Senegal | 50.94 | |
| 64 | 6 | 8 | Mathieu Bachmann | Seychelles | 51.03 | |
| 65 | 4 | 1 | James Allison | Cayman Islands | 51.16 | |
| 66 | 4 | 4 | Ridhwan Mohamed | Kenya | 51.39 | |
| 67 | 6 | 2 | Tendo Mukalazi | Uganda | 51.46 | |
| 68 | 5 | 1 | Bartal Erlingsson Eidesgaard | Faroe Islands | 51.52 | |
| 69 | 4 | 6 | Delron Felix | Grenada | 51.74 | |
| 70 | 2 | 4 | Batbayaryn Enkhtamir | Mongolia | 52.09 | |
| 71 | 5 | 7 | Miguel Mena | Nicaragua | 52.12 | |
| 72 | 5 | 2 | Cherantha de Silva | Sri Lanka | 52.29 | |
| 73 | 4 | 7 | Alexander Shah | Nepal | 52.30 | NR |
| 74 | 4 | 5 | Ahmed Al-Mutairy | Iraq | 52.41 | |
| 75 | 1 | 5 | Andrey Villarreal | Panama | 52.77 | |
| 76 | 4 | 3 | Finau Ohuafi | Tonga | 52.82 | |
| 77 | 4 | 8 | Alassane Seydou | Niger | 52.87 | |
| 78 | 3 | 5 | Marc Dansou | Benin | 53.06 | |
| 79 | 4 | 0 | Raphael Grand'Pierre | Haiti | 53.23 | |
| 80 | 3 | 2 | Carel Irakoze | Burundi | 53.49 | |
| 81 | 4 | 2 | Vasilije Andrić | Montenegro | 53.52 | |
| 82 | 2 | 8 | Jinnosuke Suzuki | Northern Mariana Islands | 53.72 | |
| 83 | 4 | 9 | Christian Nikles | Brunei | 53.83 | |
| 84 | 3 | 3 | Martin Muja | Kosovo | 54.30 | |
| 85 | 2 | 0 | Israel Poppe | Guam | 55.21 | |
| 86 | 3 | 6 | Eloi Maniraguha | Rwanda | 55.67 | |
| 87 | 3 | 4 | Phansovannarun Montross | Cambodia | 55.71 | NR |
| 88 | 2 | 9 | Siraj AI-Sharif | Libya | 56.95 | |
| 89 | 3 | 7 | Sangay Tenzin | Bhutan | 57.05 | |
| 90 | 3 | 0 | Papa Poku Dwumoh | Ghana | 57.68 | |
| 91 | 3 | 8 | Edgar Iro | Solomon Islands | 57.90 | |
| 92 | 3 | 1 | Saddam Ramziyorzoda | Tajikistan | 58.29 | |
| 93 | 1 | 8 | Shawn Dingilius-Wallace | Palau | 1:00.01 | |
| 94 | 2 | 7 | Charly Ndjoume | Cameroon | 1:00.42 | |
| 95 | 3 | 9 | Mamadou Bah | Guinea | 1:00.55 | |
| 96 | 2 | 5 | Houssein Gaber Ibrahim | Djibouti | 1:00.85 | |
| 97 | 2 | 2 | Muhammad Ali Moosa | Malawi | 1:02.47 | |
| 98 | 2 | 3 | Ebrima Buaro | Gambia | 1:02.79 | |
| 99 | 1 | 2 | Phillip Kinono | Marshall Islands | 1:03.19 | |
| 100 | 1 | 4 | Tilahun Malede | Ethiopia | 1:07.48 | |
| | 1 | 1 | Komi Amegashie | Togo | DNS | |
| | 1 | 3 | Md Asif Reza | Bangladesh | DNS | |
| | 1 | 7 | Higinio Ndong Obama | Equatorial Guinea | DNS | |
| | 2 | 6 | Ailton Lima | Cape Verde | DNS | |
| | 5 | 3 | Issa Al-Adawi | Oman | DNS | |
| | 5 | 6 | Pedro Chiancone | Uruguay | DNS | |
| | 5 | 8 | Danilo Rosafio | Kenya | DNS | |
| | 6 | 6 | Colins Ebingha | Nigeria | DNS | |
| | 7 | 6 | Hugo González | Spain | DNS | |
| | 7 | 7 | Matej Duša | Slovakia | DNS | |
| | 9 | 3 | Mikkel Lee | Singapore | DNS | |
| | 9 | 5 | Tom Dean | Great Britain | DNS | |
| | 9 | 8 | Sina Gholampour | Iran | DNS | |
| | 9 | 9 | Waleed Abdulrazzaq | Kuwait | DNS | |
| | 11 | 2 | Szebasztián Szabó | Hungary | DNS | |
| | 11 | 3 | Dylan Carter | Trinidad and Tobago | DNS | |
| | 12 | 2 | Yuri Kisil | Canada | DNS | |
| | 12 | 7 | Matthew Richards | Great Britain | DNS | |

=== Semifinals ===
The semifinals were started on 20 December at 18:14.

| Rank | Heat | Lane | Name | Nationality | Time | Notes |
|---|---|---|---|---|---|---|
| 1 | 1 | 4 | Alessandro Miressi | Italy | 45.58 | Q, NR |
| 2 | 2 | 4 | Joshua Liendo | Canada | 46.29 | Q |
| 3 | 1 | 5 | Maxime Grousset | France | 46.35 | Q |
| 4 | 2 | 3 | Ryan Held | United States | 46.36 | Q |
| 5 | 2 | 8 | Hwang Sun-woo | South Korea | 46.46 | Q, NR |
| 6 | 2 | 5 | Vladislav Grinev | Russian Swimming Federation | 46.49 | Q |
| 7 | 2 | 1 | Stan Pijnenburg | Netherlands | 46.60 | Q |
| 8 | 2 | 2 | Jack McMillan | Ireland | 46.70 | Q |
| 9 | 2 | 7 | Heiko Gigler | Austria | 46.74 | NR |
| 10 | 1 | 8 | Mikel Schreuders | Aruba | 47.01 | |
| 11 | 1 | 3 | Pan Zhanle | China | 47.09 | |
| 12 | 1 | 2 | Zach Apple | United States | 47.33 | |
| 13 | 1 | 6 | Youssef Ramadan | Egypt | 47.36 | |
| 14 | 2 | 6 | Gabriel Santos | Brazil | 47.37 | |
| 15 | 1 | 7 | Daniel Zaitsev | Estonia | 47.42 | |
| 16 | 1 | 1 | Lorenzo Zazzeri | Italy | 47.50 | |

=== Final ===
The final was held on 21 December at 18:35.

| Rank | Lane | Name | Nationality | Time | Notes |
|---|---|---|---|---|---|
| 1st place, gold medalist(s) | 4 | Alessandro Miressi | Italy | 45.57 | NR |
| 2nd place, silver medalist(s) | 6 | Ryan Held | United States | 45.63 | |
| 3rd place, bronze medalist(s) | 5 | Joshua Liendo | Canada | 45.82 | |
| 4 | 7 | Vladislav Grinev | Russian Swimming Federation | 46.05 | |
| 5 | 3 | Maxime Grousset | France | 46.20 | |
| 6 | 2 | Hwang Sun-woo | South Korea | 46.34 | NR |
| 7 | 8 | Jack McMillan | Ireland | 46.97 | |
| 8 | 1 | Stan Pijnenburg | Netherlands | 47.07 | |
