= Gibraltar at the 2022 Commonwealth Games =

- Flag of Gibraltar
- CG code: GIB
- CGA: Gibraltar Commonwealth Games Association
- Website: facebook.com/TeamGibraltarCGA (Facebook)

in Birmingham, England 28 July 2022 – 8 August 2022
- Competitors: 23 (17 men and 6 women) in 7 sports
- Flag bearers (opening): Derek Barbara; Holly O'Shea
- Flag bearer (closing): TBD
- Medals: Gold 0 Silver 0 Bronze 0 Total 0

Commonwealth Games appearances (overview)
- 1958; 1962; 1966; 1970; 1974; 1978; 1982; 1986; 1990; 1994; 1998; 2002; 2006; 2010; 2014; 2018; 2022; 2026; 2030

Gibraltar competed at the 2022 Commonwealth Games in Birmingham, England between 28 July and 8 August 2022. Having made its Games debut in 1958, it was Gibraltar's seventeenth appearance to date.

Cyclist Derek Barbara and weightlifter Holly O'Shea were the country's flagbearers during the opening ceremony.

== Competitors ==
Gibraltar received a quota of 22 open allocation slots from Commonwealth Sport. This quota is used to determine the overall team in sports lacking a qualifying system.

The following is the list of number of competitors participating at the Games per sport/discipline.

Sport	Men	Women	Total
Athletics	2	0	2
Cycling	7	2	9
Gymnastics	0	2	2
Squash	1	0	1
Swimming	4	1	5
Triathlon	3	0	3
Weightlifting	0	1	1
Total	17	6	23

== Athletics ==
One athlete was selected on 5 April 2022.

Men
Track and road events

Athlete	Event	Heat		Semifinal		Final	
Athlete	Event	Result	Rank	Result	Rank	Result	Rank
Craig Gill	100 m	11.09	8	did not advance			
Craig Gill	200 m	22.74	6	did not advance			
Arnold Rogers	Marathon	—N/a				2:37:11	16

== Cycling ==
Seven cyclists were selected on 5 April 2022.

=== Road ===
Men

Athlete	Event	Time	Rank
Derek Barbara	Road race	DNF	
Juan Guzman	Road race	DNF	
Mark Lett	Road race	3:39:10	69
Samuel O'Shea	Road race	DNF	
John Pratts	Road race	DNF	
Derek Barbara	Time trial	1:05:05.87	53
Mark Lett	Time trial	53:56.84	28
Samuel O'Shea	Time trial	54:59.17	30

Women

Athlete	Event	Time	Rank
Olivia Lett	Road race	2:50:30	42
Elaine Pratts	Road race	DNF	
Olivia Lett	Time trial	48:53.14	28
Elaine Pratts	Time trial	48:14.65	27

=== Mountain Biking ===
Athlete	Event	Time	Rank
Giles Cerisola	Men’s cross-country	LAP	
Karl Sciortino	Men’s cross-country	LAP	

== Gymnastics ==
One gymnast was selected on 5 April 2022.

=== Rhythmic ===
Individual Qualification

Athlete	Event	Apparatus				Total	Rank
Athlete	Event	Hoop	Ball	Clubs	Ribbon	Total	Rank
Mie Alvarez	Qualification	17.100	18.400	19.00	15.100	69.600	29
Kylie Gaiviso	Qualification	19.700	20.100	17.900	16.400	74.100	27

== Squash ==
One player was selected on 5 April 2022.

Athlete	Event	Round of 64	Round of 32	Round of 16	Quarterfinals	Semifinals	Final	
Athlete	Event	Opposition Score	Opposition Score	Opposition Score	Opposition Score	Opposition Score	Opposition Score	Rank
Christian Navas	Men's singles	Jervis (CAY); W 3 - 1	Willstrop (ENG); L 0 - 3	did not advance				

== Swimming ==
Five swimmers were selected on 5 April 2022.

Men

Athlete	Event	Heat		Semifinal		Final	
Athlete	Event	Time	Rank	Time	Rank	Time	Rank
Aidan Carroll	50 m freestyle	25.16	56	did not advance			
Jordan Gonzalez	50 m freestyle	26.36	60	did not advance			
Matt Savitz	100 m freestyle	55.53	59	did not advance			
Matt Savitz	200 m freestyle	2:01.46	35	—N/a		did not advance	
Jordan Gonzalez	50 m backstroke	28.94	39	did not advance			
Jordan Gonzalez	100 m backstroke	1:02.10	31	did not advance			
Johnpaul Balloqui	50 m butterfly	26.51	43	did not advance			
Aidan Carroll	50 m butterfly	25.84	32	did not advance			
Johnpaul Balloqui	100 m butterfly	57.98	38	did not advance			
Aidan Carroll	100 m butterfly	57.17	33	did not advance			
Johnpaul Balloqui	200 m butterfly	2:10.50	18	—N/a		did not advance	
Aidan Carroll	200 m butterfly	2:12.47	19	—N/a		did not advance	
Jordan Gonzalez; Johnpaul Balloqui; Aidan Carroll; Matt Savitz	4 × 100 m freestyle relay	Disqualified		—N/a		did not advance	
Matt Savitz; Jordan Gonzalez; Aidan Carroll; Johnpaul Balloqui	4 × 200 m freestyle relay	—N/a				8:08.83	8

Women

Athlete	Event	Heat		Semifinal		Final	
Athlete	Event	Time	Rank	Time	Rank	Time	Rank
Asia Kent	50 m freestyle	29.17	55	did not advance			
Asia Kent	50 m breaststroke	34.47	24	did not advance			
Asia Kent	100 m breaststroke	1:15.80	21	did not advance			
Asia Kent	200 m breaststroke	2:43.98	11	—N/a		did not advance	

== Triathlon ==
Three triathletes were selected on 5 April 2022.

Athlete	Event	Swim (750 m)	Trans 1	Bike (20 km)	Trans 2	Run (5 km)	Total	Rank
Kelvin Gomez	Men's	10:49	1:02	30:14	0:28	17:29	1:00:02	29
Andrew Gordon	Men's	9:54	0:55	29:22	0:20	17:33	58:04	27
Robert Matto	Men's	11:47	1:06	31:32	0:30	19:36	1:04:31	36

== Weightlifting ==
One weightlifter qualified through their position in the IWF Commonwealth Ranking List (as of 9 March 2022). This will mark the country's sport debut at the Commonwealth Games.

Athlete	Event	Weight lifted		Total	Rank
Athlete	Event	Snatch	Clean & jerk	Total	Rank
Holly O'Shea	Women's 71 kg	74	97	171	10
