= 2021 FINA World Swimming Championships (25 m) – Men's 50 metre freestyle =

Swimming competition

Men's 50 metre freestyle at the 2021 FINA World Swimming Championships (25 m)
- Venue: Etihad Arena
- Location: Abu Dhabi, United Arab Emirates
- Dates: 18 December (heats and semifinals); 19 December (final)
- Competitors: 99 from 93 nations
- Winning time: 20.45

Medalists
gold medal	Ben Proud	Great Britain
silver medal	Ryan Held	United States
bronze medal	Joshua Liendo	Canada

The Men's 50 metre freestyle competition of the 2021 FINA World Swimming Championships (25 m) was held on 18 and 19 December 2021.

== Records ==
Prior to the competition, the existing world and championship records were as follows.

World record	Caeleb Dressel (USA)	20.16	Budapest, Hungary	21 November 2020
Competition record	Florent Manaudou (FRA)	20.26	Doha, Qatar	5 December 2014

== Results ==
=== Heats ===
The heats were started on 18 December at 10:26.

Rank	Heat	Lane	Name	Nationality	Time	Notes
1	10	4	Ben Proud	Great Britain	20.91	Q
2	11	5	Thom de Boer	Netherlands	20.94	Q
3	10	8	Ryan Held	United States	21.01	Q
3	11	0	Joshua Liendo	Canada	21.01	Q, NR
5	10	5	Lorenzo Zazzeri	Italy	21.08	Q
6	11	8	Leonardo Deplano	Italy	21.33	Q
7	9	9	Ian Ho	Hong Kong	21.36	Q, NR
8	10	3	Jesse Puts	Netherlands	21.39	Q
9	7	4	Matej Duša	Slovakia	21.44	Q
9	8	3	Nicholas Lia	Norway	21.44	Q, NR
9	9	2	Daniel Zaitsev	Estonia	21.44	Q
9	10	6	Maxime Grousset	France	21.44	Q
13	9	4	Szebasztián Szabó	Hungary	21.46	Q
14	11	7	Daniil Markov	Russian Swimming Federation	21.50	Q
15	11	6	Michael Andrew	United States	21.52	Q
16	8	9	Abdelrahman Sameh	Egypt	21.53	Q
17	11	4	Vladimir Morozov	Russian Swimming Federation	21.54	
18	9	6	Emre Sakçı	Turkey	21.55	
19	9	3	Vladyslav Bukhov	Ukraine	21.59	
20	10	7	Calum Bain	Ireland	21.61	
21	9	5	Paweł Juraszek	Poland	21.68	
22	10	2	Jasper Aerents	Belgium	21.70	
23	8	2	Miguel Nascimento	Portugal	21.72	
24	11	3	Simonas Bilis	Lithuania	21.74	
25	8	4	Wang Changhao	China	21.78	
25	8	7	Zhang Zhoujian	China	21.78	
27	10	9	Nikola Miljenić	Croatia	21.79	
28	7	2	Mikel Schreuders	Aruba	21.80	NR
29	10	0	Bradley Tandy	South Africa	21.87	
30	7	8	Aleksey Tarasenko	Uzbekistan	21.91	NR
31	11	2	Yuri Kisil	Canada	21.93	
32	9	7	Oussama Sahnoune	Algeria	21.96	
33	9	8	Gabriel Santos	Brazil	21.98	
34	9	1	Emir Muratović	Bosnia and Herzegovina	22.00	
35	8	1	Kaloyan Bratanov	Bulgaria	22.05	
35	10	1	Guido Buscaglia	Argentina	22.05	
37	11	1	Julien Henx	Luxembourg	22.08	
38	9	0	Alberto Mestre	Venezuela	22.16	
39	8	5	Thomas Hallock	Switzerland	22.23	
40	7	0	Nikolas Antoniou	Cyprus	22.33	NR
41	7	1	Lamar Taylor	Bahamas	22.38	
42	8	6	Alexandr Varakin	Kazakhstan	22.40	
43	7	6	Louis Ortiz	Puerto Rico	22.41	
44	7	9	George Stoica-Constantin	Romania	22.43	
45	8	8	Sina Gholampour	Iran	22.61	
46	8	0	Mohammed Bedour	Jordan	22.72	
47	7	5	Souhail Hamouchane	Morocco	22.81	
48	7	3	Alaa Masoo	FINA Refugee Team	22.87	
49	6	5	Adama Niane	Senegal	22.90	
50	6	8	Nixon Hernández	El Salvador	23.22	
51	6	6	Sidrell Williams	Jamaica	23.23	
52	6	7	José Quintanilla	Bolivia	23.42	
53	6	1	Gregory Anodin	Mauritius	23.46	
54	6	3	Vladimir Mamikonyan	Armenia	23.54	
55	6	4	Tendo Mukalazi	Uganda	23.56	
56	6	0	Kerry Ollivierre	Grenada	23.58	
57	5	5	Alassane Seydou	Niger	23.61	
58	6	9	Miguel Mena	Nicaragua	23.79	
59	1	3	Julio Rodríguez	Panama	23.85	
60	1	5	Juhn Tenorio	Northern Mariana Islands	23.97	
61	4	4	Alexander Shah	Nepal	24.07	
62	5	6	Christian Nikles	Brunei	24.11	
63	5	2	Belly-Cresus Ganira	Burundi	24.22	
64	4	2	Yousef Al-Khulaifi	Qatar	24.23	
65	5	3	Dalvi Elezi	Albania	24.24	
65	5	4	Raphael Grand'Pierre	Haiti	24.24	
67	2	0	Md Asif Reza	Bangladesh	24.28	
68	5	1	Hilal Hemed Hilal	Tanzania	24.38	
69	1	6	Eltonte Leonard	Saint Vincent and the Grenadines	24.52	
70	5	8	Andrew Fowler	Guyana	24.58	
71	5	0	Eloi Maniraguha	Rwanda	24.60	
72	4	6	Martin Muja	Kosovo	24.61	
73	5	7	Jefferson Kpanou	Benin	24.65	
74	2	5	Ahmed Al-Hasani	Iraq	24.74	
75	5	9	Vasilije Andrić	Montenegro	24.90	
76	2	3	Mahmoud Abu Gharbieh	Palestine	24.95	
77	1	4	Mohamed Aan Hussain	Maldives	25.00	
77	2	2	Terrel Monplaisir	Saint Lucia	25.00	
79	4	3	Phansovannarun Montross	Cambodia	25.28	NR
80	2	9	Matt Savitz	Gibraltar	25.38	
81	2	8	Rohan Shearer	Turks and Caicos Islands	25.47	
82	4	5	Troy Pina	Cape Verde	25.61	
83	3	4	Sangay Tenzin	Bhutan	26.29	
84	3	3	Mamadou Bah	Guinea	26.48	
85	4	8	Edgar Iro	Solomon Islands	26.52	
86	2	7	Yann Douma	Republic of the Congo	26.73	
87	4	7	Saddam Ramziyorzoda	Tajikistan	26.81	
88	3	5	Shawn Dingilius-Wallace	Palau	27.10	
88	4	0	Houssein Gaber Ibrahim	Djibouti	27.10	
90	4	1	Joshua Wyse	Sierra Leone	27.12	
91	3	7	Phillip Kinono	Marshall Islands	27.78	
92	3	2	Achala Gekabel	Ethiopia	27.98	
93	3	8	Hakim Youssouf	Comoros	28.05	
94	3	1	Muhammad Moosa	Malawi	28.16	
95	2	1	Ebrahim Al-Maleki	Yemen	28.32	
96	3	0	Omar Darboe	Gambia	28.59	
97	3	6	Adam Mpali	Gabon	28.71	
98	1	7	Jolanio Guterres	Timor-Leste	32.33	
99	2	4	Terence Tengue	Central African Republic	34.27	
	1	2	Higinio Ndong Obama	Equatorial Guinea	DNS	
	2	6	Loic Leenaerts	Togo	DNS	
	3	9	Yves Munyu Kupiata	Democratic Republic of the Congo	DNS	
	4	9	Souleymane Napare	Burkina Faso	DNS	
	6	2	Danilo Rosafio	Kenya	DNS	
	7	7	Colins Ebingha	Nigeria	DNS	
	11	9	Mikkel Lee	Singapore	DNS	

=== Semifinals ===
The semifinals were started on 18 December at 18:38.

Rank	Heat	Lane	Name	Nationality	Time	Notes
1	2	5	Ryan Held	United States	20.81	Q
2	1	5	Joshua Liendo	Canada	20.88	Q, NR
3	2	4	Ben Proud	Great Britain	20.95	Q
4	1	4	Thom de Boer	Netherlands	20.98	Q
5	2	3	Lorenzo Zazzeri	Italy	21.02	Q
6	2	1	Szebasztián Szabó	Hungary	21.06	Q
7	1	7	Maxime Grousset	France	21.16	Q
8	2	6	Ian Ho	Hong Kong	21.22	Q, NR
9	1	3	Leonardo Deplano	Italy	21.27	
10	1	1	Daniil Markov	Russian Swimming Federation	21.33	
11	2	2	Matej Duša	Slovakia	21.38	NR
11	2	7	Daniel Zaitsev	Estonia	21.38	NR
13	1	6	Jesse Puts	Netherlands	21.41	
14	1	8	Abdelrahman Sameh	Egypt	21.43	
15	1	2	Nicholas Lia	Norway	21.44	=NR
16	2	8	Michael Andrew	United States	21.63	

=== Final ===
The final was held on 19 December at 19:06.

Rank	Lane	Name	Nationality	Time	Notes
1st place, gold medalist(s)	3	Ben Proud	Great Britain	20.45	
2nd place, silver medalist(s)	4	Ryan Held	United States	20.70	
3rd place, bronze medalist(s)	5	Joshua Liendo	Canada	20.76	NR
4	2	Lorenzo Zazzeri	Italy	20.94	
5	6	Thom de Boer	Netherlands	21.07	
6	1	Maxime Grousset	France	21.08	
7	7	Szebasztián Szabó	Hungary	21.26	
8	8	Ian Ho	Hong Kong	21.27	
