= Swimming at the 2022 Commonwealth Games – Men's 50 metre freestyle =

Men's 50 metre freestyle at the 2022 Commonwealth Games
- Venue: Sandwell Aquatics Centre
- Dates: 2 August (heats, semifinals); 3 August (final)
- Competitors: 71 from 45 nations
- Winning time: 21.36

Medalists
gold medal	Ben Proud	England
silver medal	Lewis Burras	England
bronze medal	Joshua Liendo	Canada

The men's 50 metre freestyle event at the 2022 Commonwealth Games will be held on 2 and 3 August at the Sandwell Aquatics Centre.

== Records ==
Prior to this competition, the existing world, Commonwealth and Games records were as follows:

World record	César Cielo (BRA)	20.91	São Paulo, Brazil	18 December 2009
Commonwealth record	Ben Proud (GBR)	21.11	Glasgow, United Kingdom	8 August 2018
Games record	Ben Proud (ENG)	21.30	Gold Coast, Australia	9 April 2018

== Schedule ==
The schedule is as follows:

All times are British Summer Time (UTC+1)

Date	Time	Round
Tuesday 2 August 2022	10:51	Qualifying
Tuesday 2 August 2022	20:11	Semifinals
Wednesday 3 August 2022	19:45	Final

== Results ==
=== Heats ===
Rank	Heat	Lane	Name	Nationality	Time	Notes
1	9	5	Lewis Burras	England	22.09	Q
2	8	5	Tom Nowakowski	Australia	22.42	Q
3	7	4	Ben Proud	England	22.44	Q
4	9	4	Dylan Carter	Trinidad and Tobago	22.48	Q
5	8	4	Joshua Liendo	Canada	22.49	Q
6	8	3	Jonathan Tan	Singapore	22.53	Q
7	7	2	Lamar Taylor	Bahamas	22.59	Q
8	7	5	Teong Tzen Wei	Singapore	22.62	Q
9	9	3	Grayson Bell	Australia	22.64	Q
10	9	2	Dan Jones	Wales	22.65	Q
11	7	3	Mikkel Lee	Singapore	22.69	Q
12	9	6	Flynn Southam	Australia	22.79	Q
13	7	6	Adam Barrett	England	22.89	Q
14	8	2	Clayton Jimmie	South Africa	22.98	Q
15	8	6	Cameron Gray	New Zealand	23.00	Q
16	8	7	Stephen Calkins	Canada	23.01	Q
17	9	1	Joel Watterson	Isle of Man	23.20	R
18	5	2	Hansel McCaig	Fiji	23.29	R?
18	9	8	Stefano Mitchell	Antigua and Barbuda	23.29	R?
20	5	7	Bradley Vincent	Mauritius	23.34	
21	7	8	Harry Robinson	Isle of Man	23.56	
22	5	3	Jack Kirby	Barbados	23.59	
23	5	5	David Young	Fiji	23.62	
23	9	7	Abeiku Jackson	Ghana	23.62	
25	7	7	Bryan Leong	Malaysia	23.64	
26	7	1	Markos Iakovidis	Cyprus	23.72	
27	6	3	Nathaniel Thomas	Jamaica	23.89	
28	8	1	Sidrell Williams	Jamaica	23.94	
29	5	4	Harry Shalamon	Jersey	24.04	
30	4	6	Adam Moncherry	Seychelles	24.10	
31	4	2	Ronny Hallett	Guernsey	24.15	
31	6	1	Ollie Brehaut	Jersey	24.15	
33	6	6	Jonathan Beck	Guernsey	24.18	
34	5	1	James Allison	Cayman Islands	24.21	
35	6	8	Matthew Lawrence	Mozambique	24.23	
36	6	4	Gregory Anodin	Mauritius	24.33	
37	6	7	Tendo Mukalazi	Uganda	24.37	
38	6	5	Shane Cadogan	Saint Vincent and the Grenadines	24.38	
39	5	6	Ridhwan Mohamed	Kenya	24.41	
40	4	7	Collins Saliboko	Tanzania	24.44	
41	4	5	Adrian Robinson	Botswana	24.57	
42	3	3	Warren Lawrence	Dominica	24.63	
43	4	3	Syed Muhammad Haseeb Tariq	Pakistan	24.65	
44	6	2	Md Asif Reza	Bangladesh	24.67	
45	8	8	Mathieu Bachmann	Seychelles	24.71	
46	4	1	Mohamed Aan Hussain	Maldives	24.82	
47	2	8	Christos Manoli	Cyprus	24.87	
48	5	8	Epeli Rabua	Fiji	24.88	
49	3	6	Alan Uhil	Tonga	24.92	
49	4	4	Finau Ohuafi	Tonga	24.92	
51	3	4	Jack Allan	Jersey	24.98	
52	3	1	Kenale Alleyne	Saint Vincent and the Grenadines	25.04	
53	4	8	Atuhaire Ambala	Uganda	25.13	
54	3	2	Eloi Maniraguha	Rwanda	25.15	
54	3	5	Paul Mahaica	Guyana	25.15	
56	2	4	Aidan Carroll	Gibraltar	25.16	
57	3	7	Rohan Karim Shearer	Turks and Caicos Islands	25.64	
58	2	3	Bryson George	Saint Vincent and the Grenadines	26.08	
59	2	5	Sekhel Tzedeq	Guyana	26.27	
60	3	8	Jordan Gonzalez	Gibraltar	26.36	
61	2	6	Duwaine Yon	Saint Helena	27.01	
62	2	7	Alex Lake	Anguilla	27.16	
63	1	5	Charly Ndjoume	Cameroon	27.39	
64	1	4	Joshua Wyse	Sierra Leone	27.40	
65	2	2	Edgar Iro	Solomon Islands	27.42	
66	2	1	Simanga Dlamini	Eswatini	27.47	
67	1	1	Mohamed Kamara	Sierra Leone	27.69	
68	1	7	William Caswell	Saint Helena	27.80	
69	1	6	Tsinde Kumbatira	Malawi	27.84	
70	1	3	Ebrima Buaro	The Gambia	27.95	
71	1	8	Matthew Tiako	Solomon Islands	32.29	
	1	2	Stefan Thomas	Saint Helena	DNS	

=== Semifinals ===
Rank	Heat	Lane	Name	Nationality	Time	Notes
1	2	5	Ben Proud	England	21.63	Q
2	2	3	Joshua Liendo	Canada	21.92	Q
2	2	4	Lewis Burras	England	21.92	Q
4	1	4	Tom Nowakowski	Australia	22.20	Q
5	1	5	Dylan Carter	Trinidad and Tobago	22.35	Q
6	1	6	Teong Tzen Wei	Singapore	22.36	Q
7	2	6	Lamar Taylor	Bahamas	22.45	Q
8	2	2	Grayson Bell	Australia	22.55	Q
9	1	3	Jonathan Tan	Singapore	22.57	R
10	1	7	Flynn Southam	Australia	22.60	R
11	1	1	Clayton Jimmie	South Africa	22.62	
12	1	8	Stephen Calkins	Canada	22.66	
13	1	2	Dan Jones	Wales	22.76	
14	2	7	Mikkel Lee	Singapore	22.77	
14	2	8	Cameron Gray	New Zealand	22.77	
16	2	1	Adam Barrett	England	22.86	

=== Final ===
Rank	Lane	Name	Nationality	Time	Notes
1st place, gold medalist(s)	4	Ben Proud	England	21.36	
2nd place, silver medalist(s)	3	Lewis Burras	England	21.68	
3rd place, bronze medalist(s)	5	Joshua Liendo	Canada	22.02	
4	2	Dylan Carter	Trinidad and Tobago	22.10	
5	7	Teong Tzen Wei	Singapore	22.26	
6	6	Tom Nowakowski	Australia	22.37	
7	1	Lamar Taylor	Bahamas	22.51	
8	8	Grayson Bell	Australia	22.53	
