= Ruslan Gaziev =

Canadian swimmer (born 1999)

Personal information
- National team: Canada
- Born: August 16, 1999 (age 27) Moscow, Russia
- Height: 1.91 m (6 ft 3 in)

Sport
- Sport: Swimming
- Strokes: Freestyle
- Club: Etobicoke Swim Club
- College team: Ohio State Buckeyes; Toronto Varsity Blues
- Coach: Brian Schrader
Medal record
Men's swimming
Representing Canada
World Championships (LC)
Silver medal – second place	2022 Budapest	4×100 m mixed freestyle
Commonwealth Games
Silver medal – second place	2022 Birmingham	4×100 m mixed medley
Bronze medal – third place	2022 Birmingham	4×100 m freestyle
Bronze medal – third place	2022 Birmingham	4×100 m mixed freestyle
World Junior Championships
Gold medal – first place	2017 Indianapolis	4×100 m mixed freestyle
Gold medal – first place	2017 Indianapolis	4×100 m mixed medley

Ruslan Gaziev (born August 16, 1999) is a Canadian competitive swimmer of Avar descent who specializes in the freestyle. Gaziev currently resides and trains in Columbus, Ohio.

== Career ==
In 2017, Gaziev won two gold medals as part of mixed relay teams at the 2017 FINA World Junior Swimming Championships, including breaking the World Junior record in the 4x100 freestyle relay.

In 2018, Gaziev was named to his first senior team at the 2018 Commonwealth Games in Australia. Gaziev also competed at the 2018 Pan Pacific Swimming Championships.

As part of the 2021 Canadian Olympic swimming trials in Toronto, Gaziev finished in third in the 100m freestyle. This qualified him for the 2020 Summer Olympics in Tokyo.

Gaziev competed collegiately for the Ohio State University and the University of Toronto, studying social science at the latter's Mississauga campus.

At the 2022 World Aquatics Championships, Gaziev swam the lead-off for the Canadian team in the heats of the 4×100 m mixed freestyle relay, helping them qualify to the event final in second place. He was replaced by Joshua Liendo in the final, but shared in the team's silver medal win, his first World medal. That same summer Gaziev participated in his second Commonwealth Games team, for the 2022 edition in Birmingham. He swam in the heats of the mixed 4×100 m freestyle relay for the Canadian team, being replaced in the event final by Javier Acevedo, and shared in the team's bronze medal win.

The following day he won a bronze with the men's team in the 4×100 m freestyle. This was the first men's relay medal for Canada at a major event since the 2015 Pan American Games, and the first at the Commonwealth Games since 2006. Gaziev said afterward that "I told the boys this is two years out of the Olympics. We might not have won but we are building momentum. We're young and we have so much there." He went on to reach the final of the 100 m freestyle, and placed fourth, 0.27 seconds behind bronze medalist Duncan Scott. He noted "four years ago at this meet I didn't even reach the semifinal so I've come a long way." Gaziev then distinguished himself swimming the anchor leg for Canada in the 4×100 m mixed medley, narrowly out-touching Freya Anderson of England to take the silver medal for the team.

In May 2024, he was suspended for 18 months for anti-doping violations.
