= Swimming at the 2022 Commonwealth Games – Mixed 4 × 100 metre freestyle relay =

Mixed 4 × 100 metre freestyle relay at the 2022 Commonwealth Games
- Venue: Sandwell Aquatics Centre
- Dates: 29 July
- Competitors: 91 from 19 nations
- Winning time: 3:21.18

Medalists
gold medal	William Yang; Kyle Chalmers; Mollie O'Callaghan; Emma McKeon; Flynn Southam*; Zac Incerti*; Meg Harris*; Madison Wilson*	Australia
silver medal	Lewis Burras; Tom Dean; Anna Hopkin; Freya Anderson; Edward Mildred*; Jacob Whittle*; Isabella Hindley*; Abbie Wood*	England
bronze medal	Javier Acevedo; Joshua Liendo; Rebecca Smith; Maggie Mac Neil; Ruslan Gaziev*; Stephen Calkins*; Ella Jansen*; Mary-Sophie Harvey*	Canada

The mixed 4 × 100 metre freestyle relay event at the 2022 Commonwealth Games will be held on 29 July at the Sandwell Aquatics Centre.

== Records ==
Prior to this competition, the existing world, Commonwealth and Games records were as follows:

Record	Time	Athlete (nation)	Meet	Location	Date	Ref
World record	3:19.38	Australia (AUS); Jack Cartwright; Kyle Chalmers; Madison Wilson; Mollie O'Callaghan		Budapest, Hungary	24 June 2022	
Commonwealth record	3:19.38	Australia (AUS); Jack Cartwright; Kyle Chalmers; Madison Wilson; Mollie O'Callaghan		Budapest, Hungary	24 June 2022	
Games record		New event				

== Schedule ==
The schedule is as follows:

All times are British Summer Time (UTC+1)

Date	Time	Round
Friday 29 July 2022	12:30	Heats
Friday 29 July 2022	21:15	Final

== Results ==
=== Heats ===
Rank	Heat	Lane	Nation	Swimmers	Time	Notes
1	3	4	Australia	Flynn Southam (49.21); Zac Incerti (48.02); Meg Harris (52.59); Madison Wilson (52.32)	3:22.14	Q, GR
2	2	4	England	Edward Mildred (48.99); Jacob Whittle (48.92); Isabella Hindley (55.76); Abbie Wood (54.36)	3:28.03	Q
3	3	5	Canada	Ruslan Gaziev (48.90); Stephen Calkins (48.80); Ella Jansen (55.47); Mary-Sophie Harvey (55.03)	3:28.20	Q
4	2	5	Wales	Dan Jones (49.29); Calum Jarvis (48.96); Rebecca Sutton (55.75); Medi Harris (55.66)	3:29.66	Q
5	2	3	Scotland	Stephen Milne (50.60); Evan Jones (49.61); Emma Russell (55.45); Evie Davis (55.43)	3:31.09	Q
6	1	5	Singapore	Darren Chua (50.97); Jonathan Tan (49.81); Quah Jing Wen (56.44); Amanda Lim (56.49)	3:33.71	Q
7	3	6	Jersey	Ollie Brehaut (53.00); Jack Allan (53.80); Gemma Atherley (57.72); Lily Scott (58.40)	3:42.92	Q
8	1	3	Kenya	Ridhwan Mohamed (53.23); Monyo Maina (54.06); Emily Muteti (58.33); Imara Thorpe (59.74)	3:45.36	Q, NR
9	1	4	Bahamas	Lamar Taylor (52.09); Davante Carey (53.20); Zaylie-Elizabeth Thompson (59.94); Lillian Higgs (1:01.93)	3:47.16	R
10	3	2	Isle of Man	Harry Robinson (52.60); Alex Bregazzi (51.81); Kiera Prentice (1:03.32); Emma Hodgson (1:00.72)	3:48.45	R
11	2	2	Guernsey	Tatiana Tostevin (59.70); Jonathan Beck (54.16); Orla Rabey (58.76); Ronny Hallett (56.35)	3:48.97	
12	3	1	Fiji	David Young (52.20); Cheyenne Rova (1:03.72); Rosemarie Rova (1:02.35); Hansel McCaig (51.68)	3:49.95	NR
13	2	7	Uganda	Atuhaire Ambala (55.64); Tendo Mukalazi (53.10); Kirabo Namutebi (1:00.14); Avice Meya (1:02.87)	3:51.75	NR
14	2	6	Barbados	Jack Kirby (52.24); Luis Sebastian Weekes (58.54); Danielle Treasure (1:00.02); Adara Stoddard (1:01.66)	3:52.46	NR
15	2	8	Samoa	Brandon Schuster (54.62); Kokoro Frost (56.82); Olivia Borg (59.22); Lushavel Stickland (1:02.01)	3:52.67	
16	3	7	Seychelles	Therese Soukup (1:03.96); Aaliyah Palestrini (1:02.43); Simon Bachmann (54.46); Adam Moncherry (53.36)	3:54.21	
17	3	8	Maldives	Hamna Ahmed (1:10.93); Mubal Azzam Ibrahim (57.09); Aishath Sausan (1:10.60); Mohamed Aan Hussain (56.29)	4:14.91	
18	2	2	Saint Helena	William Caswell (1:01.86); Stefan Thomas (57.85); Vivienne Ponsford (1:11.20); Poppy Davis-Coyle (1:09.67)	4:20.58	
	3	3	South Africa	Clayton Jimmie (50.03); Guy Brooks; Emma Chelius; Olivia Nel	DSQ	

=== Final ===
Rank	Lane	Nation	Swimmers	Time	Notes
1st place, gold medalist(s)	4	Australia	William Yang (48.80); Kyle Chalmers (47.55); Mollie O'Callaghan (52.62); Emma McKeon (52.21)	3:21.18	GR
2nd place, silver medalist(s)	5	England	Lewis Burras (48.28); Tom Dean (48.12); Anna Hopkin (53.27); Freya Anderson (52.78)	3:22.45	
3rd place, bronze medalist(s)	3	Canada	Javier Acevedo (49.05); Joshua Liendo (47.89); Rebecca Smith (54.41); Maggie Mac Neil (53.51)	3:24.86	
4	6	Wales	Dan Jones (49.41); Matt Richards (47.51); Medi Harris (54.33); Rebecca Sutton (55.33)	3:26.58	
5	2	Scotland	Stephen Milne (50.61); Evan Jones (49.64); Emma Russell (55.22); Evie Davis (55.24)	3:30.71	
6	7	Singapore	Jonathan Tan (49.96); Quah Zheng Wen (48.80); Quah Ting Wen (56.40); Quah Jing Wen (56.74)	3:31.90	
7	1	Jersey	Ollie Brehaut (52.50); Jack Allan (54.08); Gemma Atherley (57.61); Lily Scott (58.02)	3:42.21	
8	8	Kenya	Ridhwan Mohamed (52.75); Monyo Maina (53.30); Emily Muteti (57.70); Imara Thorpe (59.58)	3:43.33	NR
