= Lewis Burras =

British swimmer (born 2000)

Personal information
- Full name: Lewis Edward Burras
- National team: (United Kingdom) Great Britain, England
- Born: 12 February 2000 (age 26) Winchester, Hampshire, England
- Height: 6 ft 4 in (193 cm)

Sport
- Sport: Swimming
- Strokes: Freestyle
- Club: Loughborough University (current), Hamilton Aquatics Dubai (former)
- College team: University of South Carolina
Medal record
Men's swimming
Event	1st	2nd	3rd
World Championships (LC)	0	0	1
Commonwealth Games	0	3	0
Total	0	3	1
Representing Great Britain
World Championships (LC)
Bronze medal – third place	2022 Budapest	4×100 m medley
European Junior Championships
Silver medal – second place	2018 Helsinki	4×100 m mixed medley
Bronze medal – third place	2018 Helsinki	50 m freestyle
Representing England
Commonwealth Games
Silver medal – second place	2022 Birmingham	4×100 m mixed freestyle
Silver medal – second place	2022 Birmingham	4×100 m freestyle
Silver medal – second place	2022 Birmingham	50 m freestyle

Lewis Edward Burras (born 12 February 2000) is a British competitive swimmer. He is the former British record holder in the long course 100-metre freestyle. He is a 2022 Commonwealth Games silver medalist in the 50-metre freestyle, 4 × 100-metre freestyle relay, and 4×100-metre mixed freestyle relay, swimming on the finals relay for both relay events. At the 2022 World Aquatics Championships, he won a bronze medal in the 4×100-metre medley relay, swimming freestyle on the prelims relay, placed seventh in the 50-metre freestyle and seventh in the 100-metre freestyle. He placed eighth in the final of the 50-metre freestyle and twelfth in the semi-finals of the 100-metre freestyle at the 2022 World Short Course Championships.

== Background ==
Burras was born 12 February 2000. He attended Jumeirah English Speaking School in Dubai, United Arab Emirates for high school, where he competed scholastically as part of the school swim team, and attended the University of South Carolina in the United States for university, where he competed collegiately as part of the South Carolina Gamecocks swim team. In international competition, he competes representing Great Britain and England.

== Career ==
=== 2017–2018 ===
2018 European Junior Championships
Silver medal – second place	4 × 100 m mixed medley	3:51.43 (h)
Bronze medal – third place	50 m freestyle	22.69

For the 2017 FINA World Junior Swimming Championships, held in August in Indianapolis, United States, Burras placed 24th in the 100-metre freestyle with a time of 51.03 seconds, and ranked seventh in the preliminaries of the 50-metre freestyle with a 22.70 before being disqualified in the semi-finals.

At the 2018 European Junior Swimming Championships, held in Helsinki, Finland in July, Burras won two medals. In the 50-metre freestyle, he won the bronze medal with a time of 22.69 seconds, finishing within one-tenth of a second of silver medalist Kliment Kolesnikov of Russia. He won his second medal in the 4×100-metre mixed medley relay, splitting a 49.13 for the freestyle leg of the relay in the preliminaries to help qualify the relay to the final ranking first, where the finals relay placed second in a time of 3:51.43 and Burras won a silver medal for his contributions in the preliminaries.

=== 2022 ===
==== 2022 British Swimming Championships ====
In April 2022, at the year's British Swimming Championships, held at Ponds Forge in Sheffield, Burras won the gold medal in the 100-metre freestyle with a personal best time of 47.88 seconds. A few days later, he won the gold medal in the 50-metre freestyle with a personal best time of 21.77 seconds. Based on his results at the Championships, he was named to the 2022 World Aquatics Championships team representing Great Britain and the 2022 Commonwealth Games team representing England.

==== 2022 World Aquatics Championships ====
2022 World Championships (LC)
Bronze medal – third place	4×100 m medley	3:31.31 (h)

Burras started off on the first day of pool swimming competition, day two overall, at the 2022 World Aquatics Championships, held at Danube Arena in June in Budapest, Hungary, with a fourth-place finish in the 4×100-metre freestyle relay, helping achieve a new British record and English record time of 3:11:14 with a lead-off time of 48.09 seconds. Three days later, in the semi-finals of the 100-metre freestyle, he swam a personal best time of 47.63 seconds to set new British and English records in the event and qualify for the final ranking fourth. The following day, he placed seventh in the final with a time of 48.23 seconds. In the 50-metre freestyle final two days later, he achieved a time of 21.81 seconds to place seventh and finish 0.24 seconds behind bronze medalist Maxime Grousset of France. For the final day of pool swimming, the next day, he helped achieve a fourth-place finish in the 4×100-metre mixed freestyle relay in a time of 3:22.44, swimming the second 100 metres portion of the relay in 47.86 seconds. He also split a 47.90 for the freestyle leg of the 4×100-metre medley relay in the preliminaries, helping qualify the relay to the final ranking fifth. On the finals relay in the evening, he was substituted out, Tom Dean was substituted in, and all preliminaries and finals relay members won a bronze medal when the finals relay finished third in 3:31.31.

==== 2022 Commonwealth Games ====
2022 Commonwealth Games
Silver medal – second place	4×100 m mixed freestyle	3:22.45
Silver medal – second place	4×100 m freestyle	3:11.73
Silver medal – second place	50 m freestyle	21.68

In his first event of swimming at the 2022 Commonwealth Games, the 4×100-metre mixed freestyle relay on day one of competition, conducted at Sandwell Aquatics Centre in Birmingham, Burras led-off the finals relay with a time of 48.28 seconds to help win the silver medal in 3:22.45. Leading off the 4×100-metre freestyle relay in the final of the event the following day, he swam a 48.39 to help achieve a time of 3:11.73 and win the silver medal. In the preliminaries of the 100-metre freestyle the following day, he was one of three swimmers representing England to qualify for the semi-finals, ranking twelfth overall with his time of 49.70 seconds. He placed thirteenth in the semi-finals with a time of 49.96 seconds.

For the preliminaries of the 50-metre freestyle on day five, Burras ranked as the fastest swimmer across all heats with a time of 22.09 seconds, which was 0.45 seconds faster than fellow semi-finals qualifier and Englishman Ben Proud, who ranked third overall. Lowering his time to a 21.92 in the semi-finals, he qualified for the final ranking second. In the final, he finished in a person best time of 21.68 seconds to win the silver medal behind Ben Proud.

==== 2022 World Short Course Championships ====
In October, Burras was named to the British Swimming roster for the 2022 World Short Course Championships, held in December following the transplanting of the meet from the Palace of Water Sports in Kazan, Russia, to the Melbourne Sports and Aquatic Centre in Melbourne, Australia. For the 50-metre butterfly on day one, 13 December, he placed thirty-fifth overall with a personal best time of 23.18 seconds. The second morning, he swam a personal best time of 46.92 seconds in the preliminaries of the 100-metre freestyle, dropping 3.99 seconds from his previous best mark of 50.91 seconds to qualify for the semi-finals ranking thirteenth. He placed twelfth in the semi-finals with a personal best time of 46.61 seconds. Day four, he achieved a 2.52-second drop from his personal best time of 23.52 seconds from 2016 in the preliminaries of the 50-metre freestyle, qualifying for the semi-finals ranking sixth with his new personal best time of 21.00 seconds. He further lowered his personal best time in the semi-finals, achieving a time of 20.94 seconds to qualify for the final tied in rank for fifth with Dylan Carter of Trinidad and Tobago. In the final of the 50-metre freestyle the following day he placed eighth, finishing 0.03 seconds behind seventh-place finisher Kyle Chalmers of Australia and 0.49 seconds behind gold medalist Jordan Crooks of the Cayman Islands with a time of 20.95 seconds.

=== 2023 ===
In March, at the 2023 New South Wales State Open Championships in Sydney, Burras placed fourth in the final of the 50-metre freestyle with a 22.41, finishing 0.04 seconds behind bronze medalist Kyle Chalmers, and sixth in the preliminaries of the 100-metre freestyle with a 49.80 before withdrawing from further competition in the event. On day three of the 2023 British Swimming Championships in Sheffield in April, he ranked fifth in the preliminaries of the 100-metre freestyle, qualifying for the final with a time of 48.77 seconds. He won the final with a 2023 World Aquatics Championships qualifying time of 47.99 seconds, finishing 0.01 seconds ahead of second-place finisher Duncan Scott. It marked his second-consecutive national title in the event. On day five, he swam a time of 21.95 seconds in the preliminaries of the 50-metre freestyle and qualified for the final ranking first overall. He won the silver medal in the final with a World Championships qualifying time of 21.92 seconds, finishing second and 0.21 seconds behind Ben Proud. Following the completion of the Championships, he was named to the Great Britain roster for the 2023 World Aquatics Championships, marking his second time being on a senior long course World Aquatics Championships roster.

== International championships (50 m) ==
Meet	50 free	100 free	4×100 free	4×100 medley	4×100 mixed free	4×100 mixed medley
Junior level
WJC 2017	DSQ	24th				
EJC 2018	3rd place, bronze medalist(s)		7th	5th		(silver) ^{[a]}
Senior level
WC 2022	7th	7th	4th	(bronze) ^{[a]}	4th	
CG 2022	2nd place, silver medalist(s)	13th	2nd place, silver medalist(s)		2nd place, silver medalist(s)	

^{a} Burras swam only in the prelims heats.

== International championships (25 m) ==
Meet	50 freestyle	100 freestyle	50 butterfly
WC 2022	8th	12th	35th

== Personal best times ==
=== Long course metres (50 m pool) ===
Event	Time		Meet	Location	Date	Notes	Ref
50 m freestyle	21.68		2022 Commonwealth Games	Birmingham	3 August 2022		
100 m freestyle	47.63	sf	2022 World Aquatics Championships	Budapest, Hungary	21 June 2022	British record, English record	

Legend: sf – semifinal

=== Short course metres (25 m pool) ===
Event	Time		Meet	Location	Date	Ref
50 m freestyle	20.94	sf	2022 World Short Course Championships	Melbourne, Australia	16 December 2022	
100 m freestyle	46.61	sf	2022 World Short Course Championships	Melbourne, Australia	14 December 2022	
50 m butterfly	23.18	h	2022 World Short Course Championships	Melbourne, Australia	13 December 2022	

Legend: h – preliminary heat; sf – semifinal

== National records ==
=== Long course metres (50 m pool) ===
No.	Event	Time		Meet	Location	Date	Type	Status	Ref
1	4×100 m freestyle	3:11.14		2022 World Aquatics Championships	Budapest, Hungary	18 June 2022	British record, English record	Current	
2	100 m freestyle	47.63	sf	2022 World Aquatics Championships	Budapest, Hungary	21 June 2022	British record, English record	Current	

Legend: sf – semifinal

== Awards and honours ==
- Southeastern Conference, All-SEC Team, Second Team: 2020
- Southeastern Conference, SEC Academic Honour Roll: 2019–2020
