= Swimming at the 2022 Commonwealth Games – Men's 100 metre butterfly =

Men's 100 metre butterfly at the 2022 Commonwealth Games
- Venue: Sandwell Aquatics Centre
- Dates: 1 August (heats, semifinals); 2 August (final)
- Competitors: 47 from 31 nations
- Winning time: 51.24

Medalists
gold medal	Joshua Liendo	Canada
silver medal	James Guy	England
silver medal	Matthew Temple	Australia

The men's 100 metre butterfly event at the 2022 Commonwealth Games was held on 1 and 2 August at the Sandwell Aquatics Centre.

== Records ==
Prior to this competition, the existing world, Commonwealth and Games records were as follows:

Record	Time	Athlete (nation)	Meet	Location	Date	Ref
World record	49.45	Caeleb Dressel (USA)		Tokyo, Japan	31 July 2021	
Commonwealth record	50.39	Joseph Schooling (SGP)		Rio de Janeiro, Brazil	12 August 2016	
Games record	50.65	Chad le Clos (RSA)		Gold Coast, Australia	7 April 2018	

== Schedule ==
The schedule is as follows:

All times are British Summer Time (UTC+1)

Date	Time	Round
Monday 1 July 2022	11:09	Qualifying
Monday 1 July 2022	19:57	Semifinals
Tuesday 2 August 2022	19:49	Final

== Results ==
=== Heats ===
Rank	Heat	Lane	Name	Nationality	Time	Notes
1	6	4	Joshua Liendo	Canada	51.36	Q
2	5	6	Jamie Ingram	England	52.17	Q
3	5	4	Jacob Peters	England	52.18	Q
4	7	4	Matthew Temple	Australia	52.28	Q
5	5	5	Cody Simpson	Australia	52.47	Q
6	7	5	James Guy	England	52.49	Q
7	6	6	Teong Tzen Wei	Singapore	52.58	Q
8	7	6	Quah Zheng Wen	Singapore	52.63	Q
9	7	3	Chad Le Clos	South Africa	52.65	Q
10	5	3	Finlay Knox	Canada	52.97	Q
11	7	2	Lewis Fraser	Wales	53.16	Q
12	5	2	Abeiku Jackson	Ghana	53.60	Q
13	7	1	Bryan Leong	Malaysia	53.94	Q
14	6	3	Matthew Sates	South Africa	54.02	WD
15	6	7	Gregor Swinney	Scotland	54.05	Q
16	6	1	Evan Jones	Scotland	54.06	WD
17	7	8	Tom Beeley	Scotland	54.15	R, Q
18	6	8	Andrew Ross	South Africa	54.26	R
19	6	2	Sajan Prakash	India	54.36	Q
20	7	7	Tom Carswell	Wales	54.60	
21	5	7	Kael Yorke	Trinidad and Tobago	54.62	
22	5	1	Cadell Lyons	Trinidad and Tobago	54.63	
23	4	4	Harry Shalamon	Jersey	54.89	
24	4	1	Matthew Lawrence	Mozambique	56.52	
25	4	3	Davante Carey	Bahamas	56.58	
26	4	5	Md Nahid	Bangladesh	56.78	
27	4	7	Peter Allen	Isle of Man	56.80	
28	3	5	Robbie Jones	Jersey	56.83	
28	4	2	Charlie-Joe Hallett	Guernsey	56.83	
30	4	6	Sidrell Williams	Jamaica	56.84	
31	3	7	Collins Saliboko	Tanzania	56.86	
32	4	8	Jack Allen	Jersey	57.10	
33	3	3	Aidan Carroll	Gibraltar	57.17	NR
34	2	4	Adam Moncherry	Seychelles	57.22	
35	5	8	Mathieu Bachmann	Seychelles	57.55	
36	3	8	Zackary Gresham	Grenada	57.80	NR
37	3	6	Temafa Yalimaiwai	Fiji	57.90	
38	1	5	Johnpaul Balloqui	Gibraltar	57.98	
39	3	1	Ethan Stubbs-Green	Antigua and Barbuda	57.99	
40	2	2	Paul Mahaica	Guyana	58.96	
41	3	2	James Allison	Cayman Islands	59.21	
42	2	3	Finau Ohuafi	Tonga	59.45	
43	2	5	Kokoro Frost	Samoa	1:00.53	
44	2	7	Isihaka Isihaka	Rwanda	1:00.95	
45	2	6	Mohamed Aan Hussain	Maldives	1:03.35	
46	1	4	Simanga Dlamini	Eswatini	1:04.99	
47	1	3	Mohamed Rihan Shiham	Maldives	1:05.12	
	3	4	Keanan Dols	Jamaica	DNS	
	6	5	Kyle Chalmers	Australia	DNS	

=== Semifinals ===
Rank	Heat	Lane	Name	Nationality	Time	Notes
1	1	5	Matthew Temple	Australia	51.52	Q
2	2	2	Chad Le Clos	South Africa	51.64	Q
3	1	3	James Guy	England	51.82	Q
4	2	4	Joshua Liendo	Canada	51.85	Q
5	2	3	Cody Simpson	Australia	52.16	Q
6	1	2	Finlay Knox	Canada	52.19	Q
7	2	5	Jacob Peters	England	52.23	Q
8	1	4	Jamie Ingram	England	52.27	Q
9	1	6	Quah Zheng Wen	Singapore	52.53	R
10	2	7	Lewis Fraser	Wales	52.81	R
11	2	6	Teong Tzen Wei	Singapore	52.88	
12	1	7	Abeiku Jackson	Ghana	53.79	
13	2	1	Bryan Leong	Malaysia	53.87	
14	1	1	Gregor Swinney	Scotland	53.95	
15	2	8	Tom Beeley	Scotland	54.15	
16	1	8	Sajan Prakash	India	54.24	

=== Final ===
Rank	Lane	Name	Nationality	Time	Notes
1st place, gold medalist(s)	6	Joshua Liendo	Canada	51.24	
2nd place, silver medalist(s)	3	James Guy	England	51.40	
2nd place, silver medalist(s)	4	Matthew Temple	Australia	51.40	
4	5	Chad Le Clos	South Africa	51.61	
5	2	Cody Simpson	Australia	52.06	
6	1	Jacob Peters	England	52.16	
7	7	Finlay Knox	Canada	52.20	
8	8	Jamie Ingram	England	52.33	
