= Swimming at the 2022 Commonwealth Games – Men's 4 × 100 metre freestyle relay =

Men's 4 × 100 metre freestyle relay at the 2022 Commonwealth Games
- Venue: Sandwell Aquatics Centre
- Dates: 30 July
- Competitors: 65 from 13 nations
- Winning time: 3:11.12

Medalists
gold medal	Flynn Southam; Zac Incerti; William Yang; Kyle Chalmers; Matthew Temple*; Cody Simpson*; Elijah Winnington*	Australia
silver medal	Lewis Burras; Jacob Whittle; James Guy; Tom Dean; Edward Mildred*; Joe Litchfield * Jamie Ingram * Cameron Kurle*	England
bronze medal	Joshua Liendo; Ruslan Gaziev; Finlay Knox; Javier Acevedo; Stephen Calkins*; Jeremy Bagshaw * Eric Brown*	Canada

The men's 4 × 100 metre freestyle relay event at the 2022 Commonwealth Games was held on 30 July at the Sandwell Aquatics Centre.

== Records ==
Prior to this competition, the existing world, Commonwealth and Games records were as follows:

World record	United States (USA); Michael Phelps; Garrett Weber-Gale; Cullen Jones; Jason Lezak	3:08.24	Beijing, China	11 August 2008
Commonwealth record	Australia (AUS); Eamon Sullivan; Andrew Lauterstein; Ashley Callus; Matt Targett	3:09.91	Beijing, China	11 August 2008
Games record	Australia; Cameron McEvoy; James Magnussen; Jack Cartwright; James Roberts	3:12.72	Gold Coast, Australia	6 April 2018

== Schedule ==
The schedule is as follows:

All times are British Summer Time (UTC+1)

Date	Time	Round
Saturday 30 July 2022	11:44	Heats
Saturday 30 July 2022	21:43	Final

== Results ==
=== Heats ===
Rank	Heat	Lane	Nation	Swimmers	Time	Notes
1	2	4	Australia	Matthew Temple (49.01); Cody Simpson (48.86); Flynn Southam (47.89); Elijah Winnington (49.88)	3:15.64	Q
2	2	5	England	Edward Mildred (49.22); Joe Litchfield (48.95); Jamie Ingram (49.15); Cameron Kurle (49.61)	3:16.93	Q
3	1	5	Wales	Tom Carswell (50.05); Lewis Fraser (49.84); Liam White (49.69); Dan Jones (49.11)	3:18.69	Q
4	1	4	Canada	Finlay Knox (49.26); Stephen Calkins (48.95); Jeremy Bagshaw (50.46); Eric Brown (51.57)	3:20.24	Q
5	1	1	Singapore	Jonathan Tan (50.65); Quah Zheng Wen (48.64); Mikkel Lee (50.51); Darren Chua (50.94)	3:20.74	Q
6	2	3	South Africa	Guy Brooks (50.13); Clayton Jimmie (50.28); Andrew Ross (50.29); Brenden Crawford (53.98)	3:24.68	Q
7	2	6	Isle of Man	Joel Watterson (50.63); Alex Bregazzi (52.65); Harry Robinson (51.29); Peter Allen (52.73)	3:27.30	Q
8	2	2	Fiji	Hansel McCaig (51.40); Epeli Rabua (54.74); Temafa Yalimaiwai (54.38); David Young (51.66)	3:32.18	Q, NR
9	1	6	Jersey	Robbie Jones (53.37); Harry Shalamon (51.59); Ollie Brehaut (53.82); Isaac Dodds (54.68)	3:33.46	R
10	1	2	Guernsey	Charlie-Joe Hallett (53.57); Samuel Lowe (54.17); Ronny Hallett (53.50); Jonathan Beck (54.03)	3:35.27	R
11	1	7	Seychelles	Adam Moncherry (53.26); Tyler Fred (53.16); Simon Bachmann (54.04); Mathieu Bachmann (55.32)	3:35.78	
12	2	1	Saint Helena	Stefan Thomas (58.87); William Caswell (1:01.86); Duwaine Yon (1:04.31); Joshua Yon (1:05.68)	4:10.72	
	2	7	Gibraltar	Jordan Gonzalez (57.22); Johnpaul Balloqui; Aidan Carroll; Matt Savitz	DSQ	
	1	3	Scotland		DNS	

=== Final ===
Rank	Lane	Nation	Swimmers	Time	Notes
1st place, gold medalist(s)	4	Australia	Flynn Southam (48.54); Zac Incerti (47.96); William Yang (47.60); Kyle Chalmers (47.02)	3:11.12	GR
2nd place, silver medalist(s)	5	England	Lewis Burras (48.39); Jacob Whittle (47.94); James Guy (48.70); Tom Dean (46.70)	3:11.73	
3rd place, bronze medalist(s)	6	Canada	Joshua Liendo (48.33); Ruslan Gaziev (48.13); Finlay Knox (48.82); Javier Acevedo (47.73)	3:13.01	
4	3	Wales	Dan Jones (49.71); Matt Richards (47.49); Tom Carswell (49.50); Calum Jarvis (49.09)	3:15.79	
5	2	Singapore	Jonathan Tan (50.16); Quah Zheng Wen (48.41); Mikkel Lee (49.08); Darren Chua (50.28)	3:17.93	
6	7	South Africa	Guy Brooks (49.97); Clayton Jimmie (50.12); Andrew Ross (50.24); Brenden Crawford (53.08)	3:23.41	
7	1	Isle of Man	Joel Watterson (50.70); Alex Bregazzi (51.73); Harry Robinson (51.40); Peter Allen (52.61)	3:26.44	
8	8	Fiji	Hansel McCaig (51.43); Epeli Rabua (54.22); Temafa Yalimaiwai (54.34); David Young (51.47)	3:31.46	NR
