= Edward Mildred =

British swimmer

Personal information
- Nationality: British (English)
- Born: 10 April 2003 (age 23) Northampton, England
- Height: 1.91 m (6 ft 3 in)

Sport
- Sport: Swimming
- Strokes: butterfly
Medal record
Men's swimming
Representing Great Britain
European Championships (LC)
Silver medal – second place	2022 Rome	4×100 m mixed freestyle
Bronze medal – third place	2022 Rome	4×100 m freestyle
European U-23 Championships
Gold medal – first place	2023 Dublin	100 m freestyle
Silver medal – second place	2023 Dublin	4×100 m mixed medley
Bronze medal – third place	2023 Dublin	100 m butterfly
European Junior Championships
Silver medal – second place	2021 Rome	100 m freestyle
Silver medal – second place	2021 Rome	4×100 m mixed medley
Bronze medal – third place	2019 Kazan	4x100 m freestyle
Bronze medal – third place	2021 Rome	100 m butterfly
European Youth Olympic Festival
Gold medal – first place	2019 Baku	200 m freestyle
Gold medal – first place	2019 Baku	4×100 m freestyle
Gold medal – first place	2019 Baku	4×100 m mixed freestyle
Silver medal – second place	2019 Baku	200 m butterfly
Silver medal – second place	2019 Baku	4×100 m medley
Silver medal – second place	2019 Baku	4×100 m mixed medley
Representing England
Commonwealth Games
Silver medal – second place	2022 Birmingham	4×100 m freestyle
Silver medal – second place	2022 Birmingham	4×100 m mixed freestyle
Silver medal – second place	2026 Glasgow	4×100 m freestyle
Bronze medal – third place	2022 Birmingham	4×100 m mixed medley

Edward Mildred (born 10 April 2003) is a British swimmer who won three medals at the 2022 Commonwealth Games.

== Career ==
Mildred competed in the men's 200 metre butterfly event at the 2021 FINA World Swimming Championships (25 m) in Abu Dhabi.

He produced a personal best of 52.19 seconds in the men's 100 metre butterfly at the 2022 European Aquatics Championships in Rome.

who won the gold medal in the 100 metre freestyle at the inaugural U-23 European Championships in 2023.

In 2025, Mildred successfully defended his 100 metres butterfly title at the 2025 Aquatics GB Swimming Championships, which sealed a qualification place for the 2025 World Aquatics Championships in Singapore.
