= Jamie Ingram =

English swimmer

Personal information
- Nationality: British (English)
- Born: 23 March 1998 (age 28) South Wingfield, Derbyshire, England

Sport
- Sport: Swimming
- Strokes: Butterfly
- Club: City of Manchester
Medal record
Men's swimming
Representing England
Commonwealth Games
Silver medal – second place	2022 Birmingham	4×100 m freestyle

Jamie Ingram (born 23 March 1998) is an English international swimmer. He has represented England at the Commonwealth Games and won a silver medal.

== Biography ==
Ingram educated at the University of Manchester won the bronze medal in the 100 metres butterfly, posting a personal best of 52.46 at the 2022 British Swimming Championships. He had previously won a gold & a silver in the 100m freestyle and butterfly at the British Universities and Colleges Championships.

In 2022, he was selected for the 2022 Commonwealth Games in Birmingham where he competed in two events; the men's 100 metres butterfly and the men's 4 × 100 m freestyle relay, winning a silver medal as part of the team.
