= Joshua Liendo =

Canadian swimmer (born 2002)

- Liendo in 2026

Personal information
- Full name: Joshua Ismael Liendo Edwards
- National team: Canada
- Born: August 20, 2002 (age 24) Toronto, Ontario, Canada
- Height: 1.92 m (6 ft 4 in)

Sport
- Sport: Swimming
- Strokes: Freestyle, butterfly
- Club: High Performance Centre – Ontario
- College team: University of Florida
- Coach: Anthony Nesty
Medal record
Men's swimming
Representing Canada
| Event | 1st | 2nd | 3rd |
|---|---|---|---|
| Olympic Games | 0 | 1 | 0 |
| World Championships (LC) | 0 | 2 | 3 |
| World Championships (SC) | 1 | 0 | 2 |
| World Junior Championships | 0 | 1 | 2 |
| Commonwealth Games | 2 | 0 | 3 |
| Total | 3 | 4 | 10 |
Olympic Games
| Silver medal – second place | 2024 Paris | 100 m butterfly |
World Championships (LC)
| Silver medal – second place | 2022 Budapest | 4×100 m mixed freestyle |
| Silver medal – second place | 2023 Fukuoka | 100 m butterfly |
| Bronze medal – third place | 2022 Budapest | 100 m freestyle |
| Bronze medal – third place | 2022 Budapest | 100 m butterfly |
| Bronze medal – third place | 2025 Singapore | 4×100 m mixed medley |
World Championships (SC)
| Gold medal – first place | 2021 Abu Dhabi | 4×50 m mixed freestyle |
| Bronze medal – third place | 2021 Abu Dhabi | 50 m freestyle |
| Bronze medal – third place | 2021 Abu Dhabi | 100 m freestyle |
Commonwealth Games
| Gold medal – first place | 2022 Birmingham | 100 m butterfly |
| Gold medal – first place | 2026 Glasgow | 100 m butterfly |
| Bronze medal – third place | 2022 Birmingham | 50 m freestyle |
| Bronze medal – third place | 2022 Birmingham | 4×100 m freestyle |
| Bronze medal – third place | 2022 Birmingham | 4×100 m mixed freestyle |
World Junior Championships
| Silver medal – second place | 2019 Budapest | 100 m freestyle |
| Bronze medal – third place | 2019 Budapest | 4×100 m medley |
| Bronze medal – third place | 2019 Budapest | 4×100 m mixed medley |
Junior Pan Pacific Championships
| Bronze medal – third place | 2018 Suva | 4×100 m medley |

Joshua Ismael Liendo Edwards (born August 20, 2002) is a Canadian competitive swimmer. The 2024 Olympic silver medalist in the men's 100 metre butterfly, he is also a five-time World Aquatics Championships medallist and three-time FINA World Swimming Championships medallist, as well as the 2022 Commonwealth champion in the 100 metre butterfly.

Liendo is the first Black Canadian swimmer to win an individual medal at a major international championship, and the first to medal at the Olympic Games. He represented Canada at the 2020 and 2024 Summer Olympics.

== Career ==
=== Early life ===
Liendo was born in Toronto, Ontario to a Vincentian Mother and Venezuelan Father. He spent his early childhood in Trinidad and Tobago, beginning his swimming journey there with the Silver Sharks Swim Club.

His family relocated to Scarborough when he was nine years old. He began club swimming with the Toronto Olympian Swim Team, before moving to the North York Aquatic Club. He would later cite Michael Phelps as his inspiration to focus on the butterfly discipline.

At the 2017 Canadian junior championships, Liendo set an age group record in the 100 m butterfly, swimming it in 54.76 seconds, which he would later cite as the moment he knew he could go far in the sport. At the 2018 Junior Pan Pacific Swimming Championships, held in August in Suva, Fiji, he won a bronze medal in the 400 metre medley relay, splitting a 53.65 for the butterfly leg of the relay to contribute to the final time of 3:21.32. Liendo was named to his first national team for the 2018 Summer Youth Olympics held in October in Buenos Aires, Argentina.

=== 2019 season ===
Liendo's first senior team was at the 2019 World Aquatics Championships, where he competed in the 4×100 men's medley relay. The team finished in tenth place and did not qualify for the finals.

Later in the year, Liendo won three medals at the 2019 FINA World Junior Swimming Championships in Budapest, and for that performance was named as Swimming Canada's junior male swimmer of the year. At a time when Swimming Canada was enjoying enormous success with its women's program while the men's program was struggling, Liendo was widely identified as perhaps the most promising emerging talent on the men's side.

=== 2021 season ===
As part of the 2021 Canadian Olympic swimming trials in Toronto, Liendo broke the national record in the 100 m butterfly event, with a time of 51.40. This qualified him for the 2020 Summer Olympics in Tokyo.

Liendo competed in three individual events in Tokyo (the 50 m and 100 m freestyle and the 100 m butterfly), but did not advance beyond the semi-finals in any of them. He was part of the Canadian team in the 4 × 100 m freestyle relay that unexpectedly qualified to the event final and the finished in fourth place, 0.60 seconds back of a bronze medal. He also swam the butterfly leg of the 4 × 100 m medley relay, where the Canadian team finished seventh.

Following the Olympics, Liendo competed at the FINA World Swimming Championships in Abu Dhabi. He won individual bronze medals in the 50 m and 100 m freestyle events, and was part of the gold medal-winning Canadian team in the 4×50 m mixed freestyle relay. Of the gold medal, he remarked "I wasn't expecting a gold medal going into it. To look at the board and see gold medal, world champion, looking back on that it was a crazy moment being on top of that board and hearing that anthem. It definitely made me want more."

=== 2022 season ===
Liendo began the 2022 World Aquatics Championships as part of the Canadian team for the 4 × 100 m freestyle relay, where they finished in sixth place. He then qualified to an individual World Championship event final for the first time in the 100 m freestyle, ranking third in the semi-finals with another personal best time. In the event final, Liendo led at the halfway mark, finishing third to take the bronze medal in a close contest, with only 0.07 seconds separating him and silver medalist Maxime Grousset of France. This was the first individual medal at the World Championships for a Canadian man since Ryan Cochrane's final bronze medal in 2015. On the day after his bronze medal, the championships' schedule called on Liendo to perform a "double-double," swimming in two heats in the morning session and two semi-finals in the evening session to qualify for the finals of both the 100 m butterfly and the 50 m freestyle. He was third among semi-finalists in both. The following day, Liendo competed in three finals in the evening session, finishing fifth in the 50 m freestyle before winning his second bronze medal in the 100 m butterfly. He then joined the Canadian team in the 4 × 100 m mixed freestyle relay, leading off the event and helping win a silver medal. He remarked "it was a fun night."

Named to Canada's team for the 2022 Commonwealth Games, Liendo began the first day of the championships by winning the bronze medal in the mixed 4 × 100 m freestyle relay, and qualifying to the event final of the 50 m butterfly by placing ninth in the heats and fourth in the semi-finals. The following day he placed sixth in the 50 m butterfly final with a new personal best time of 23.42, and won a bronze with the men's team in the 4 × 100 m freestyle. This was the first men's relay medal for Canada at a major event since the 2015 Pan American Games, and the first at the Commonwealth Games since 2006. On the fourth day, Liendo finished seventh in the 100 m freestyle final, and qualified to the 100 m butterfly with the fourth-fastest time in the semi-finals. He noted that "the butterfly feels a lot better than freestyle right now." He went on to win gold in the 100 m butterfly final, his first individual gold at a major championship. On the final day of the swimming competitions, he won a bronze medal in the 50 m freestyle, his fourth medal of the Games. Liendo admitted afterward that there's been some ups and downs at these Games but I'm glad to finish it off like this against a great field."

In the fall, Liendo began attending the University of Florida where he competes collegiately for the Florida Gators, having committed to attend in mid-August.

=== 2023 season ===
Liendo started his 2023 season by competing at the 2023 SEC Swimming and Diving Championships, where he won the men's 100-yard butterfly title in a time of 44.11 and placed second in both the 50- and 100-yard freestyles, going 18.39 and 42.24, respectively. He also won 2 SEC relay titles. In the 200-yard freestyle relay, he split 18.02 and the relay broke the SEC Meet Record in a time of 1:14.19; in the 400-yard medley relay, he split 43.35 on the butterfly leg to go 0.01 off of the fastest 100 butterfly relay split ever, and the relay broke the SEC record in a time of 2:59.48. At the 2023 NCAA Division I Championships, Liendo won gold in the 100-yard freestyle and silver in the 50-yard freestyle and 100-yard butterfly events, and helped the Florida relay teams to three gold medals and a bronze medal in relay events. Following the end of the collegiate season, Liendo broke the Canadian record in the 100 m butterfly twice at the Canadian trials, posting a 50.78 in the heats and a 50.36 in the evening final. He later set a world-leading time in the 50 m freestyle, swimming a 21.80.

In his first day of competition at the 2023 World Aquatics Championships in Budapest, Liendo was part of the Canadian men's fifth-place 4×100 m freestyle relay team, and came fifteenth in the semi-finals of the 50 m butterfly. He was fourteenth in the semi-finals of the 100 m freestyle, missing that final as well. Liendo noted he had "changed a lot of things in my freestyle this year," adding "I have some work to do." In the semi-finals of the 100 m butterfly, he finished in third place to qualify to the final, and on the same day placed eighth in the semi-finals of the 50 m freestyle, qualifying to that final by a narrow 0.03 margin over American Ryan Held and Ukraine's Vladyslav Bukhov. However, he opted against participating in the latter final, wanting to focus on the butterfly. The following day he won silver in the 100 m butterfly final with a new national record time of 50.34, and was part of a fourth-place mixed 4×100 freestyle relay team. In his final swim of the championships, he and the men's 4 × 100 m medley relay team came seventh.

=== 2024 season ===
Liendo was named to his second Canadian Olympic team, for the 2024 Summer Olympics in Paris, citing the experience he had gained in the years since Tokyo as a crucial difference for him. He was considered the top medal contender among Canadian male swimmers going into the Games. In his first individual event, he did not reach the final of the 100 m freestyle, coming eleventh in the semi-finals. Ninth in the semi-finals of the 50 m freestyle, he nevertheless advanced to the final following the withdrawal of Frenchman Maxime Grousset, and placed fourth in the event, 0.02 seconds back of French bronze medalist Florent Manaudou.

Reaching the final of the 100 m butterfly, Liendo won the silver medal with a time of 49.99, 0.09 seconds behind gold medalist Kristóf Milák of Hungary. He became the first Black Canadian swimmer to win an Olympic medal. With teammate Ilya Kharun joining him on the podium as bronze medalist, this was the first double-podium for Canada at a Summer Olympics since the women's 400 m individual medley in 1976.

=== 2025 season ===
To conclude his third collegiate season, at the 2025 NCAA Division I Championships Liendo won the 100-yard freestyle title for a third consecutive year, and collected his second consecutive gold in the 100-yard butterfly event.

At the 2025 World Aquatics Championships in Singapore, Liendo won a bronze medal swimming the butterfly leg for the Canadian team in the mixed 4 × 100 m medley relay. He came thirtieth in the heats of the 50 m freestyle, missing the semi-finals, and thirteenth in the semi-finals of the 50 m butterfly.

At the final meet of 2025 Swimming World Cup, that was held in Toronto, Liendo broke the world short course record at the 100 m butterfly with a 47.68 time, beating his compatriot Ilya Kharun (silver) and the reigning world record holder Noe Ponti (bronze).

== Personal bests ==
=== Long course (50-metre pool) ===
| Event | Time | Venue | Date | Notes | Ref |
|---|---|---|---|---|---|
| 50 m freestyle | 21.48 | Toronto Pan Am Sports Centre, Toronto | May 18, 2024 | NR | |
| 100 m freestyle | 47.55 | Duna Aréna, Budapest | June 21, 2022 | | |
| 50 m butterfly | 23.27 | Toronto Pan Am Sports Centre, Toronto | April 3, 2023 | | |
| 100 m butterfly | 49.99 | Paris La Défense Arena, Paris | August 3, 2024 | NR | |

=== Short course meters (25-metre pool) ===
| Event | Time | Venue | Date | Notes | Ref |
|---|---|---|---|---|---|
| 50 m freestyle | 20.31 | Toronto Pan Am Sports Centre, Toronto | October 23, 2025 | NR | |
| 100 m freestyle | 45.30 | Toronto Pan Am Sports Centre, Toronto | October 24, 2025 | NR | |
| 50 m butterfly | 21.91 | Toronto Pan Am Sports Centre, Toronto | October 25, 2025 | | |
| 100 m butterfly | 47.68 | Toronto Pan Am Sports Centre, Toronto | October 23, 2025 | WR | |
