= William Yang (swimmer) =

Australian swimmer (born 1998)

Personal information
- Full name: William Xu Yang
- Born: 11 October 1998 (age 27) Sydney, Australia
- Height: 1.90 m (6 ft 3 in)

Sport
- Sport: Swimming
- Strokes: Freestyle
Medal record
Representing Australia
Olympic Games
Silver medal – second place	2024 Paris	4×100 m freestyle
World Championships (LC)
Silver medal – second place	2022 Budapest	4×100 m freestyle
Commonwealth Games
Gold medal – first place	2022 Birmingham	4×100 m freestyle
Gold medal – first place	2022 Birmingham	4×100 m mixed freestyle

William Xu Yang (born 11 October 1998) is an Australian swimmer. He participated in the 2022 World Aquatics Championships and 2022 Commonwealth Games.

== Personal life ==
William's parents both are Chinese and he finished his primary school in Guangzhou. William graduated from Knox Grammar School in Sydney in 2016. He is of Chinese descent.

== Career ==
In May 2023, William had a benign tumor in his spinal canal, impinging on a nerve which required immediate surgery.

William came second at the 100m freestyle at the 2024 Australian Swimming Trials, achieving a personal best time of 48.08, 0.02 seconds slower than the Swimming Australia Olympic Qualifying Time of 48.06. He was selected in the Australian team for the 2024 Paris Olympics. At the 2024 Paris Olympics, William finished 15th overall with a time of 48.48 at the preliminary heats and a time of 48.42 at the first semi-final heat in his individual efforts in the 100 m freestyle.

== Personal best times ==
=== Long course metres (50 m pool) ===
Event	Time	Meet	Location	Date	Age	Ref
50 m freestyle	22.23	2024 Australian Swimming Trials	Brisbane, Australia	12 June 2024	25	
100 m freestyle	48.08	2024 Australian Swimming Trials	Brisbane, Australia	13 June 2024	25	
50 m backstroke	24.98	Hancock Prospecting Australian National Championships	Melbourne, Australia	11 April 2019	20	
