= Zac Incerti =

Australian swimmer (born 1996)

Personal information
- Nationality: Australian
- Born: 13 July 1996 (age 29) Mount Lawley, Australia

Sport
- Sport: Swimming
- Strokes: Freestyle, backstroke
Medal record
Representing Australia
Men's swimming
Olympic Games
Bronze medal – third place	2020 Tokyo	4×100 m freestyle
Bronze medal – third place	2020 Tokyo	4×200 m freestyle
Bronze medal – third place	2024 Paris	4x200 m freestyle
World Championships (LC)
Gold medal – first place	2022 Budapest	4×100 m mixed freestyle
Silver medal – second place	2022 Budapest	4×200 m freestyle
Commonwealth Games
Gold medal – first place	2022 Birmingham	4×100 m freestyle
Gold medal – first place	2022 Birmingham	4×200 m freestyle
Gold medal – first place	2022 Birmingham	4×100 m mixed freestyle
Bronze medal – third place	2018 Gold Coast	50 m backstroke
Oceania Championships
Gold medal – first place	2016 Suva	50 m backstroke
Gold medal – first place	2016 Suva	100 m backstroke
Gold medal – first place	2016 Suva	4×100 m freestyle
Gold medal – first place	2016 Suva	4×200 m freestyle
Gold medal – first place	2016 Suva	4×100 m medley
Silver medal – second place	2016 Suva	4×100 m mixed medley

Zac Incerti (born 13 July 1996) is a retired Australian swimmer. He competed in the men's 100 metre backstroke event at the 2017 World Aquatics Championships. He also competed at the 2020 Summer Olympics in Tokyo, where he won two bronze medals.

== Reality television ==
On 13 October 2025, Incerti was announced as a contestant on the seventh season of Love Island Australia.
