= Ebrima Buaro =

Gambian swimmer

Personal information
- Full name: Ebrima Sorry Buaro
- Nationality: Gambia
- Born: 16 September 2000 (age 24); Tanji, The Gambia

Sport
- Sport: Swimming

Ebrima Sorry Buaro (born 16 September 2000) is a Gambian swimmer. He competed in the 2020 Summer Olympics.
