= Javier Acevedo =

Canadian swimmer (born 1998)

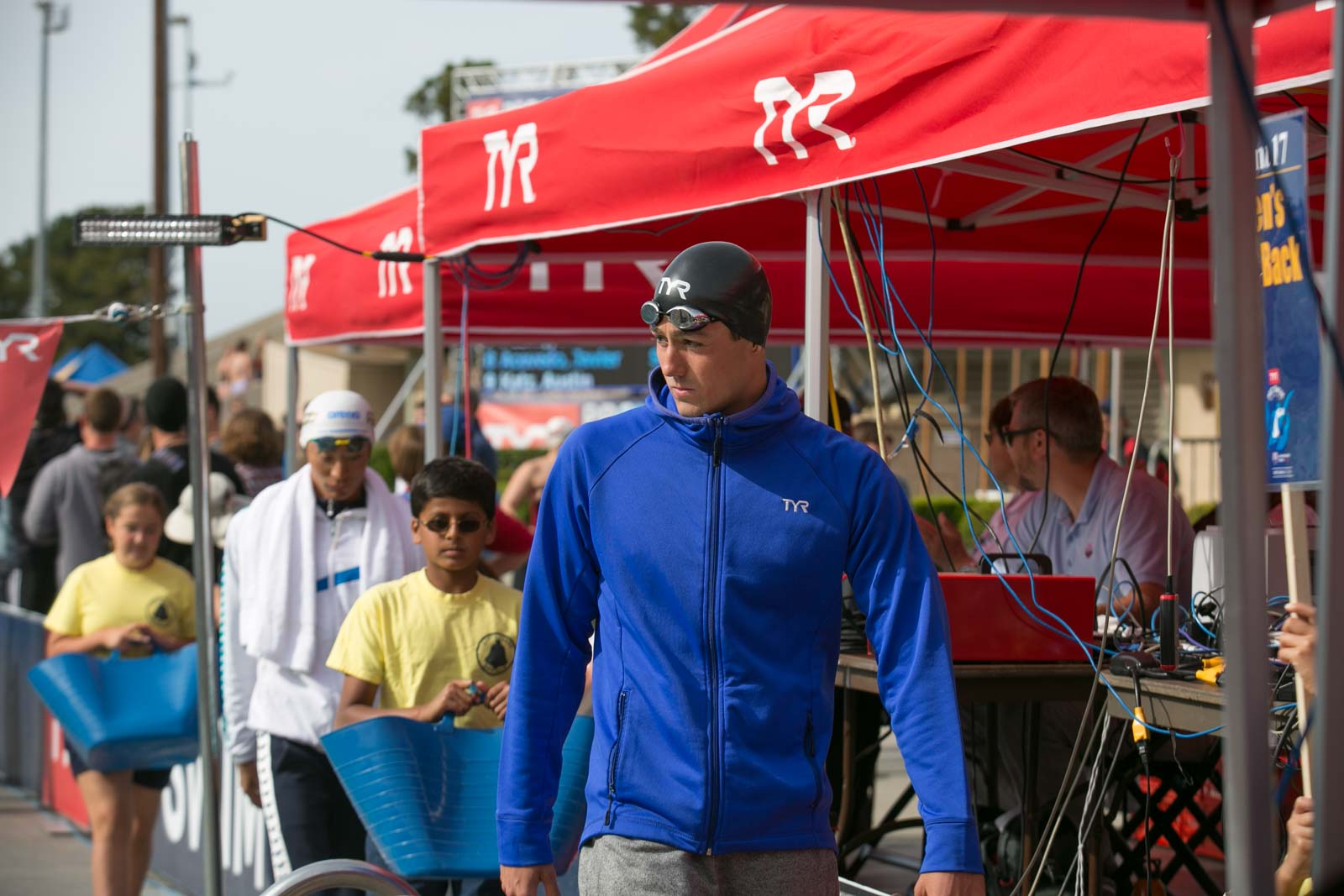
- Acevedo in 2018

Personal information
- Full name: Javier Carlos Acevedo
- National team: Canada
- Born: 28 January 1998 (age 28) Scarborough, Ontario, Canada
- Height: 187 cm (6 ft 2 in)
- Weight: 78.1 kg (172 lb)

Sport
- Sport: Swimming
- Strokes: Backstroke
- College team: University of Georgia
- Coach: Jack Bauerle (U. Georgia)
Medal record
Men's swimming
Representing Canada
World Championships (LC)
Silver medal – second place	2022 Budapest	4×100 m mixed freestyle
Bronze medal – third place	2017 Budapest	4×100 m mixed freestyle
Bronze medal – third place	2017 Budapest	4×100 m mixed medley
World Championships (SC)
Silver medal – second place	2022 Melbourne	100 m medley
Bronze medal – third place	2022 Melbourne	4×50 m mixed medley
Commonwealth Games
Silver medal – second place	2022 Birmingham	4×100 m mixed medley
Bronze medal – third place	2022 Birmingham	4×100 m mixed freestyle
Bronze medal – third place	2022 Birmingham	4×100 m freestyle
Bronze medal – third place	2022 Birmingham	50 m backstroke
Pan American Games
Silver medal – second place	2019 Lima	4×100 m mixed medley
Silver medal – second place	2023 Santiago	4×100 m mixed medley
Bronze medal – third place	2023 Santiago	4×100 m mixed freestyle
Bronze medal – third place	2023 Santiago	4×100 m medley
Bronze medal – third place	2023 Santiago	4×100 m freestyle
Bronze medal – third place	2023 Santiago	4×200 m freestyle
World Junior Championships
Gold medal – first place	2015 Singapore	4×100 m mixed freestyle
Silver medal – second place	2015 Singapore	50 m backstroke

Javier Carlos Acevedo (born 28 January 1998) is a Canadian competitive swimmer. He competes primarily in the backstroke events. Acevedo won two bronze medals at the 2017 World Aquatics Championships as part of both the mixed 4×100 m freestyle relay and the 4×100 m mixed medley relay. He has also won a gold medal at the 2015 FINA World Junior Swimming Championships in the 4×100 m mixed freestyle relay and a silver in the 50 m backstroke. Acevado was a former Junior world record holder in the 100 m backstroke event.

== Career ==
The 2015 FINA World Junior Swimming Championships were Acevedo's first opportunity to compete for the national team on a world stage. At the junior championships he won the silver medal in the 50 m metre backstroke, while setting a personal best. This was his first individual international medal, Acevedo said that "I touched the wall properly which helped get the silver in a very tight race. It was very important because I know that I will have more out speed the next time I do it. I made sure I was mentally prepared before the race. I was confident." As part of Canada's mixed 4×100 m relay team at the junior worlds, he was the gold medal winner and world junior champ. He swam in that final together with Markus Thormeyer, Penny Oleksiak, and Taylor Ruck.

He set the Junior world record in the 100 m backstroke on his way to qualifying for the event at the 2016 Summer Olympics in the Canadian Olympic Trials. In 2016, he was named to Canada's Olympic team for the 2016 Summer Olympics where he swam to a 17th-place finish in the 100 m backstroke, failing to qualify for the semi-finals. He was the youngest male swimmer on Canada's Olympic team at these games, competing at the age of 18.

Acevedo was next named to Canada's 2017 World Aquatics Championships team in Budapest, Hungary. He made it through to the semi-finals but finished with the 14th best time and out of the finals. On the same day he would compete in the 4×100 m mixed freestyle relay helping the team to a bronze. In regard to racing twice in the same night and still performing well enough to medal, Acevedo said that "It was pretty difficult, but I've done a lot of work in my training to be able to do that kind of stuff...I just had to work hard and get through it." Acevedo also competed in the 50 m backstroke, but once again failed to qualify for the finals finishing 16th in the semi-finals.

In June 2021, Acevedo was named to his second Canadian Olympic team. He competed in the Olympic debut of the mixed medley relay, but the Canadian team finished thirteenth in the heats and did not advance to the final.

At the 2022 World Aquatics Championships, Acevedo was part of the Canadian team for the 4 × 100 m mixed freestyle relay, winning the silver medal. He was the lone member of the Canadian team to participate in both the heats and the event final. He did not advance out of the heats of either the 50 or 100 m backstroke.

Named to Canada's team for the 2022 Commonwealth Games, Acevedo began the first day of the championships by winning the bronze medal in the mixed 4 × 100 m freestyle relay. The following day he won a bronze with the men's team in the 4 × 100 m freestyle. This was the first men's relay medal for Canada at a major event since the 2015 Pan American Games, and the first at the Commonwealth Games since 2006. Acevedo said on the occasion "this team is so strong and it gives us hope we can improve in the future." He went on to win an individual bronze medal in the 50 m backstroke in 24.97 seconds, lowering his own Canadian record from five years earlier. Acevedo swam the backstroke segment for Canada in the heats of the 4 × 100 m mixed medley. He was replaced by Kylie Masse in the final, but received a silver medal after the team finished second there.

== Personal bests ==
As of 11 October 2024

Long course
Event	Time	Meet	Date	Note(s)
100 m freestyle	48.50	2023 Canadian Swimming Trials	31 March 2023	
50 m backstroke	24.90	2023 Canadian Trials	29 March 2023	NR
100 m backstroke	53.55	2024 Canadian Swimming Trials	14 May 2024	
200 m backstroke	1:58.36	2018 Pan Pacific Championships	12 August 2018	

Short course
Event	Time	Meet	Date	Note(s)
50 m freestyle	21.85	Age Group International SC	11 November 2023	
100 m backstroke	49.71	FINA World Cup 2022 No 3	5 November 2022	
