= Scotland at the 2022 Commonwealth Games =

- Flag of Scotland
- CG code: SCO
- CGA: Commonwealth Games Scotland
- Website: teamscotland.scot

in Birmingham, England 28 July 2022 – 8 August 2022
- Competitors: 254 (125 men and 129 women) in 20 sports
- Flag bearers: Opening: Kirsty Gilmour and Micky Yule; Closing: Eilish McColgan
- Medals Ranked 6th: Gold 13 Silver 12 Bronze 26 Total 51

Commonwealth Games appearances (overview)
- 1930; 1934; 1938; 1950; 1954; 1958; 1962; 1966; 1970; 1974; 1978; 1982; 1986; 1990; 1994; 1998; 2002; 2006; 2010; 2014; 2018; 2022; 2026; 2030

Scotland competed at the 2022 Commonwealth Games at Birmingham, England from 28 July to 8 August 2022. Having competed at every Games since their 1930 inauguration, it was Scotland's twenty-second appearance.

== Medallists ==
| Medal | Name | Sport | Event | Date |
|---|---|---|---|---|
| Gold | Neil Fachie | Cycling | Men's tandem 1 km time trial B | 29 July |
| Gold | Duncan Scott | Swimming | Men's 200 metre freestyle | 30 July |
| Gold | Garry Brown; Kevin Wallace | Lawn bowls | Men's pairs B6–8 | 2 August |
| Gold | Rosemary Lenton; Pauline Wilson | Lawn bowls | Women's pairs B6–8 | 3 August |
| Gold | Sarah Adlington | Judo | Women's +78 kg | 3 August |
| Gold | Duncan Scott | Swimming | Men's 200 metre individual medley | 3 August |
| Gold | Eilish McColgan | Athletics | Women's 10,000 metres | 3 August |
| Gold | Robert Barr directed by Sarah Jane Ewing; Melanie Inness directed by George Miller | Lawn bowls | Mixed pairs B2–3 | 5 August |
| Gold | Sam Hickey | Boxing | Men's middleweight | 7 August |
| Gold | Sean Lazzerini | Boxing | Men's light heavyweight | 7 August |
| Gold | Reese Lynch | Boxing | Men's light welterweight | 7 August |
| Gold | Laura Muir | Athletics | Women's 1500 metres | 7 August |
| Gold | James Heatly; Grace Reid | Diving | Mixed synchronised 3 metre springboard | 8 August |
| Silver | Aileen McGlynn | Cycling | Women's tandem sprint B | 29 July |
| Silver | Sean Frame | Athletics | Men's marathon (T54) | 30 July |
| Silver | Jack Carlin | Cycling | Men's keirin | 30 July |
| Silver | Stephen Clegg | Swimming | Men's 50 metre freestyle S13 | 30 July |
| Silver | Neil Fachie | Cycling | Men's tandem sprint B | 31 July |
| Silver | Neah Evans | Cycling | Women's points race | 31 July |
| Silver | John Archibald | Cycling | Men's scratch race | 31 July |
| Silver | Finlay Allan | Judo | Men's 66 kg | 1 August |
| Silver | Micky Yule | Para powerlifting | Men's heavyweight | 4 August |
| Silver | Louise Christie | Gymnastics | Women's rhythmic individual ribbon | 6 August |
| Silver | Neah Evans | Cycling | Women's road race | 7 August |
| Silver | Eilish McColgan | Athletics | Women's 5000 metres | 7 August |
| Bronze | Beth Potter | Triathlon | Women's | 29 July |
| Bronze | Katie Shanahan | Swimming | Women's 400 metre individual medley | 29 July |
| Bronze | Toni Shaw | Swimming | Women's 100 metre freestyle S9 | 29 July |
| Bronze | Ross Murdoch | Swimming | Men's 200 metre breaststroke | 29 July |
| Bronze | Neah Evans | Cycling | Women's individual pursuit | 30 July |
| Bronze | Duncan Scott | Swimming | Men's 400 metre individual medley | 30 July |
| Bronze | Aileen McGlynn | Cycling | Women's tandem 1 km time trial B | 31 July |
| Bronze | Jack Carlin | Cycling | Men's sprint | 31 July |
| Bronze | Duncan Scott | Swimming | Men's 100 metre freestyle | 1 August |
| Bronze | Katie Shanahan | Swimming | Women's 200 metre backstroke | 1 August |
| Bronze | Shannon Archer | Gymnastics | Women's vault | 1 August |
| Bronze | Malin Wilson | Judo | Women's 57 kg | 1 August |
| Bronze | Stephen Milne; Evan Jones; Mark Szaranek; Duncan Scott | Swimming | Men's 4 × 200 metre freestyle relay | 1 August |
| Bronze | Paul Foster; Alex Marshall | Lawn bowls | Men's pairs | 2 August |
| Bronze | Ross Murdoch | Swimming | Men's 50 metre breaststroke | 2 August |
| Bronze | Rachel Tytler | Judo | Women's 78 kg | 3 August |
| Bronze | Craig McNally; Ross Murdoch; Duncan Scott; Evan Jones | Swimming | Men's 4 × 100 metre medley relay | 3 August |
| Bronze | Samantha Kinghorn | Athletics | Women's 1500 metres (T54) | 4 August |
| Bronze | Jake Wightman | Athletics | Men's 1500 metres | 6 August |
| Bronze | Laura Muir | Athletics | Women's 800 metres | 6 August |
| Bronze | Iain McLean | Lawn bowls | Men's singles | 6 August |
| Bronze | Matthew McHale | Boxing | Men's bantamweight | 6 August |
| Bronze | Tyler Jolly | Boxing | Men's welterweight | 6 August |
| Bronze | Finn Crockett | Cycling | Men's road race | 7 August |
| Bronze | Zoey Clark; Beth Dobbin; Jill Cherry; Nicole Yeargin | Athletics | Women's 4 × 400 metres relay | 7 August |
| Bronze | Rory Stewart; Greg Lobban | Squash | Men's doubles | 8 August |

Medals by sport
| Sport | Gold medal | Silver medal | Bronze medal | Total |
| Boxing | 3 | 0 | 2 | 5 |
| Lawn bowls | 3 | 0 | 2 | 5 |
| Athletics | 2 | 2 | 4 | 8 |
| Swimming | 2 | 1 | 9 | 12 |
| Cycling | 1 | 6 | 4 | 11 |
| Judo | 1 | 1 | 2 | 4 |
| Diving | 1 | 0 | 0 | 1 |
| Gymnastics | 0 | 1 | 1 | 2 |
| Para powerlifting | 0 | 1 | 0 | 1 |
| Squash | 0 | 0 | 1 | 1 |
| Triathlon | 0 | 0 | 1 | 1 |
| Total | 13 | 12 | 26 | 51 |

Medals by date
| Date | Gold medal | Silver medal | Bronze medal | Total |
| 29 July | 1 | 1 | 4 | 6 |
| 30 July | 1 | 3 | 2 | 6 |
| 31 July | 0 | 3 | 2 | 5 |
| 1 August | 0 | 1 | 5 | 6 |
| 2 August | 1 | 0 | 2 | 3 |
| 3 August | 4 | 0 | 2 | 6 |
| 4 August | 0 | 1 | 1 | 2 |
| 5 August | 1 | 0 | 0 | 1 |
| 6 August | 0 | 1 | 5 | 6 |
| 7 August | 3 | 2 | 2 | 7 |
| 8 August | 1 | 0 | 1 | 2 |
| Total | 13 | 12 | 26 | 51 |

Medals by gender
| Gender | Gold medal | Silver medal | Bronze medal | Total |
| Male | 7 | 7 | 14 | 28 |
| Female | 4 | 5 | 12 | 21 |
| Mixed / open | 2 | 0 | 0 | 2 |
| Total | 13 | 12 | 26 | 51 |

== Competitors ==
The following is the list of number of competitors participating at the Games per sport/discipline.

| Sport | Men | Women | Total |
|---|---|---|---|
| Athletics | 14 | 19 | 33 |
| Badminton | 5 | 4 | 9 |
| 3x3 basketball | 4 | 8 | 12 |
| Beach volleyball | 0 | 2 | 2 |
| Boxing | 7 | 1 | 8 |
| Cycling | 10 | 8 | 18 (Note: Plus 3 pilots) |
| Diving | 5 | 3 | 8 |
| Gymnastics | 5 | 5 | 10 |
| Hockey | 18 | 18 | 36 |
| Judo | 6 | 5 | 11 |
| Lawn bowls | 8 | 8 | 16 (Note: Plus 2 directors) |
| Netball | —N/a | 12 | 12 |
| Para powerlifting | 1 | 0 | 1 |
| Rugby sevens | 13 | 13 | 26 |
| Squash | 4 | 2 | 6 |
| Swimming | 15 | 11 | 26 |
| Table tennis | 2 | 2 | 4 |
| Triathlon | 2 | 3 | 5 (Note: Plus 1 guide) |
| Weightlifting | 2 | 3 | 5 |
| Wrestling | 4 | 2 | 6 |
| Total | 125 | 129 | 254 |

== Athletics ==
Six athletes were officially selected on 5 October 2021, though their chosen events were yet to be decided. A marathon athlete was added on 28 April 2022, followed by five para athletes on 10 June 2022 (the latter qualified via the World Para Athletics World Rankings for performances registered between 31 December 2020 and 25 April 2022).

A squad of thirty-three athletes and para athletes was confirmed on 1 July 2022, as was Stephanie Davis' withdrawal (owing to a foot injury).

Men
Track and road events

| Athlete | Event | Heat | | Semifinal | | Final | |
| Athlete | Event | Result | Rank | Result | Rank | Result | Rank |
|---|---|---|---|---|---|---|---|
| Adam Thomas | 100 m | 10.30 | 2 Q | 10.40 | 7 | did not advance | |
| Alexander Thomson | 100 m (T38) | —N/a | | | | 12.23 | 7 |
| Ross Paterson | 100 m (T38) | —N/a | | | | 11.95 | 5 |
| Guy Learmonth | 800 m | 1:49.15 | 2 Q | —N/a | | 1:48.82 | 6 |
| Neil Gourley | 1500 m | 3:48.64 | 4 Q | —N/a | | 3:32.93 | 8 |
| Josh Kerr | 1500 m | 3:37.84 | 4 Q | —N/a | | 3:35.72 | 12 |
| Jake Wightman | 1500 m | 3:48.34 | 1 Q | —N/a | | 3:30.53 | 3rd place, bronze medalist(s) |
| Andrew Butchart | 10,000 m | —N/a | | | | 27:53.57 | 7 |
| Sean Frame | Marathon (T54) | —N/a | | | | 1:45:49 | (silver) |

Field events

| Athlete | Event | Qualification | | Final | |
| Athlete | Event | Distance | Rank | Distance | Rank |
|---|---|---|---|---|---|
| Will Grimsey | High jump | —N/a | | 2.19 | 7 |
| David Smith | High jump | —N/a | | 2.15 | 9 |
| Nicholas Percy | Discus throw | 60.68 | 5 q | 63.53 | 5 |
| Chris Bennett | Hammer throw | —N/a | | 66.48 | 12 |
| Mark Dry | Hammer throw | —N/a | | 66.86 | 10 |

Women
Track and road events

| Athlete | Event | Heat | | Semifinal | | Final | |
| Athlete | Event | Result | Rank | Result | Rank | Result | Rank |
|---|---|---|---|---|---|---|---|
| Alisha Rees | 100 m | 11.36 | 4 q | 11.47 | 7 | did not advance | |
| Beth Dobbin | 200 m | 23.10 | 2 Q | 23.28 | 3 q | 23.40 | 8 |
| Zoey Clark | 400 m | 51.84 | 2 Q | 51.99 | 4 q | 51.90 | 8 |
| Nicole Yeargin | 400 m | 52.52 | 3 Q | 52.24 | 5 | did not advance | |
| Laura Muir | 800 m | 1:58.84 | 2 Q | —N/a | | 1:57.87 | 3rd place, bronze medalist(s) |
| Jemma Reekie | 800 m | 2:00.68 | 3 | —N/a | | did not advance | |
| Jenny Selman | 800 m | 2:06.53 | 5 | —N/a | | did not advance | |
| Laura Muir | 1500 m | 4:14.11 | 5 Q | —N/a | | 4:02.75 | 1st place, gold medalist(s) |
| Jemma Reekie | 1500 m | 4:16.23 | 6 q | —N/a | | 4:05.33 | 5 |
| Melanie Woods | 1500 m (T54) | —N/a | | | | 3:56.52 | 4 |
| Samantha Kinghorn | 1500 m (T54) | —N/a | | | | 3:53.38 | 3rd place, bronze medalist(s) |
| Sarah Inglis | 5000 m | —N/a | | | | 15:08.36 | 7 |
| Eilish McColgan | 5000 m | —N/a | | | | 14:42.14 | 2nd place, silver medalist(s) |
| Eloise Walker | 5000 m | —N/a | | | | 16:28.62 | 20 |
| Sarah Inglis | 10,000 m | —N/a | | | | 32:04.74 | 9 |
| Eilish McColgan | 10,000 m | —N/a | | | | 30:48.60 | (gold) |
| Heather Paton | 100 m hurdles | 13.39 | 5 | —N/a | | did not advance | |
| Rebecca Matheson; Alisha Rees; Sarah Malone; Taylah Spence | 4 × 100 m relay | 45.39 | 3 Q | —N/a | | 45.01 | 8 |
| Zoey Clark; Beth Dobbin; Jill Cherry; Nicole Yeargin | 4 × 400 m relay | —N/a | | | | 3:30.15 | 3rd place, bronze medalist(s) |

Field events

| Athlete | Event | Final | |
| Athlete | Event | Distance | Rank |
|---|---|---|---|
| Kirsty Law | Discus throw | 54.38 | 7 |

== Badminton ==
As of 1 June 2022, Scotland qualified for the mixed team event via the BWF World Rankings. A squad of nine players was officially selected on 8 June 2022.

Singles

| Athlete | Event | Round of 64 | Round of 32 | Round of 16 | Quarterfinal | Semifinal | Final / BM | |
| Athlete | Event | Opposition Score | Opposition Score | Opposition Score | Opposition Score | Opposition Score | Opposition Score | Rank |
|---|---|---|---|---|---|---|---|---|
| Callum Smith | Men's singles | March (FLK); W (21–3, 21–4) | Alphous (GHA); W (21–6, 21–7) | Penty (ENG); L (23–25, 12–21) | did not advance | | | |
| Kirsty Gilmour | Women's singles | Bye | Ho (AUS); W (21–6, 21–14) | Li (IOM); W (21–8, 21–12) | Kashyap (IND); W (21-10, 21-7) | Li (CAN); L (23-21, 21-23, 18-21) | Yeo (SGP); L (14-21, 20-22) | 4 |

Doubles

| Athlete | Event | Round of 64 | Round of 32 | Round of 16 | Quarterfinal | Semifinal | Final / BM | |
| Athlete | Event | Opposition Score | Opposition Score | Opposition Score | Opposition Score | Opposition Score | Opposition Score | Rank |
|---|---|---|---|---|---|---|---|---|
| Alexander Dunn; Adam Hall | Men's doubles | —N/a | Bye | Chan & Tan (MAS); L (21–18, 23–25, 15–21) | did not advance | | | |
| Christopher Grimley; Matthew Grimley | Men's doubles | —N/a | Shiyam & Zaki (MDV); W (21–5, 21–7) | Chia & Soh (MAS); L (19–21, 16–21) | did not advance | | | |
| Julie MacPherson; Ciara Torrance | Women's doubles | —N/a | Harada & Williams (FLK); W (21–4, 21–5) | Honderich & Tsai (CAN); L (12–21, 15–21) | did not advance | | | |
| Adam Hall; Julie MacPherson | Mixed doubles | Bye | Paul & Dookhee (MRI); W (21–7, 21–8) | Attama & Wanyana (UGA); W (21–5, 21–6) | Chan & Cheah (MAS); W (21-15, 21-19) | Ellis & Smith (ENG); L (14-21, 7-21) | Tan & Lai (MAS); L (15-21, 17-21) | 4 |
| Christopher Grimley; Eleanor O'Donnell | Mixed doubles | Zaki & F N Abdul Razzaq (MDV); W (21–8, 21–9) | Elliott & Laurens Jordaan (RSA); W (21–8, 21–10) | Hee & Tan (SGP); L (15–21, 11–21) | did not advance | | | |

Mixed team
Summary

| Team | Event | Group stage | | | | Quarterfinal | Semifinal | Final / BM | |
| Team | Event | Opposition Score | Opposition Score | Opposition Score | Rank | Opposition Score | Opposition Score | Opposition Score | Rank |
|---|---|---|---|---|---|---|---|---|---|
| Scotland | Mixed team | Maldives; W 5―0 | Uganda; W 4―1 | Canada; L 2―3 | 2 Q | Singapore; L 0-3 | did not advance | | |

Squad

- Alexander Dunn
- Christopher Grimley
- Matthew Grimley
- Adam Hall
- Callum Smith
- Kirsty Gilmour
- Julie MacPherson
- Eleanor O'Donnell
- Ciara Torrance

Group stage

| Pos | Team | Pld | W | L | MF | MA | MD | GF | GA | GD | PF | PA | PD | Pts | Qualification |
|---|---|---|---|---|---|---|---|---|---|---|---|---|---|---|---|
| 1 | Canada | 3 | 3 | 0 | 13 | 2 | +11 | 26 | 4 | +22 | 610 | 319 | +291 | 3 | Knockout stage |
| 2 | Scotland | 3 | 2 | 1 | 11 | 4 | +7 | 22 | 8 | +14 | 562 | 365 | +197 | 2 | Knockout stage |
| 3 | Uganda | 3 | 1 | 2 | 5 | 10 | −5 | 11 | 21 | −10 | 416 | 597 | −181 | 1 | |
| 4 | Maldives | 3 | 0 | 3 | 1 | 14 | −13 | 3 | 29 | −26 | 344 | 651 | −307 | 0 | |

Source: BWF

Scotland
5
National Exhibition Centre, Court 1
29 July 2022, 14:00 UTC+1

Maldives
0

| | | | 1 | 2 | 3 |
|---|---|---|---|---|---|
| 1 | (Scotland) (Maldives) | Kirsty Gilmour; Aminath Nabeeha Abdul Razzaq | 21; 4 | 21; 10 |
| 2 | (Scotland) (Maldives) | Callum Smith; Zayan Zaki | 21; 6 | 21; 10 |
| 3 | (Scotland) (Maldives) | Eleanor O'Donnell / Ciara Torrance; Aminath Nabeeha Abdul Razzaq / Fathimath Nabaaha Abdul Razzaq | 21; 12 | 21; 5 |
| 4 | (Scotland) (Maldives) | Alexander Dunn / Matthew Grimley; Ahmed Nibal / Ajfan Rasheed | 21; 12 | 21; 5 |
| 5 | (Scotland) (Maldives) | Adam Hall / Julie MacPherson; Zayan Zaki / Fathimath Nabaaha Abdul Razzaq | 21; 7 | 21; 6 |

Scotland
4
National Exhibition Centre, Court 4
30 July 2022, 09:00 UTC+1

Uganda
1

| | | | 1 | 2 | 3 |
|---|---|---|---|---|---|
| 1 | (Scotland) (Uganda) | Christopher Grimley / Eleanor O'Donnell; Daniel Wanagaliya / Husina Kobugabe | 21; 7 | 21; 7 |
| 2 | (Scotland) (Uganda) | Callum Smith; Brian Kasirye | 11; 21 | 19; 21 |
| 3 | (Scotland) (Uganda) | Kirsty Gilmour; Fadilah Mohamed Rafi | 21; 7 | 21; 11 |
| 4 | (Scotland) (Uganda) | Adam Hall / Alexander Dunn; Brian Kasirye / Daniel Wanagaliya | 21; 8 | 21; 5 |
| 5 | (Scotland) (Uganda) | Ciara Torrance / Julie MacPherson; Husina Kobugabe / Tracy Naluwooza | 21; 7 | 21; 4 |

Canada
3
National Exhibition Centre, Court 1
30 July 2022, 19:00 UTC+1

Scotland
2

| | | | 1 | 2 | 3 |
|---|---|---|---|---|---|
| 1 | (Canada) (Scotland) | Ty Alexander Lindeman / Josephine Wu; Adam Hall / Julie MacPherson | 12; 21 | 18; 21 |
| 2 | (Canada) (Scotland) | Michelle Li; Kirsty Gilmour | 21; 10 | 21; 15 |
| 3 | (Canada) (Scotland) | Brian Yang; Callum Smith | 21; 11 | 21; 9 |
| 4 | (Canada) (Scotland) | Rachel Honderich / Kristen Tsai; Julie MacPherson / Ciara Torrance | 21; 12 | 21; 13 |
| 5 | (Canada) (Scotland) | Adam Dong / Nyl Yakura; Alexander Dunn / Adam Hall | 16; 21 | 18; 21 |

Quarter Finals

Scotland
0
National Exhibition Centre, Court 1
31 July 2022, 17:30 UTC+1

Singapore
3

| | | | 1 | 2 | 3 |
|---|---|---|---|---|---|---|
| 1 | (Scotland) (Singapore) | Adam Hall / Julie MacPherson; Terry Hee / Tan Wei Han | 18; 21 | 17; 21 |
| 2 | (Scotland) (Singapore) | Callum Smith; Loh Kean Yew | 8; 21 | 5; 21 |
| 3 | (Scotland) (Singapore) | Kirsty Gilmour; Yeo Jia Min | 15; 21 | 21; 12 | 11; 21 |
| 4 | (Scotland) (Singapore) | Alexander Dunn / Matthew Grimley; Terry Hee / Loh Kean Hean | | | | not played |
| 5 | (Scotland) (Singapore) | Julie MacPherson / Ciara Torrance; Jin Yujia / Crystal Wong | | | | not played |

== 3x3 basketball ==
Great Britain was the top Commonwealth European nation in the respective FIBA 3x3 Federation Rankings for men and women (on 1 November 2021), necessitating qualifiers to determine which Home Nations would receive the associated quota places. On 6 April 2022, Scotland won both (which were held in Largs) and therefore qualified for both Commonwealth Games tournaments.

Scotland won the women's IWBF European Qualifier (also held in Largs) on 14 April 2022, thereby qualifying for the women's 3x3 wheelchair basketball tournament as well.

Squad selections were announced on 4 July 2022.

Summary

| Team | Event | Group stage | | | | Quarterfinal | Semifinal | Final / BM / CM | |
| Team | Event | Opposition Score | Opposition Score | Opposition Score | Rank | Opposition Score | Opposition Score | Opposition Score | Rank |
|---|---|---|---|---|---|---|---|---|---|
| Scotland men's | Men's tournament | Sri Lanka; W 16 - 9 | Canada; W 21 - 20 | Kenya; W 15 - 14 | 1 Q | Bye | Australia; L 15 - 20 | Canada; L 12 - 13 | 4 |
| Scotland women's | Women's tournament | Australia; L 9 - 21 | Sri Lanka; W 21 - 5 | Kenya; W 15 - 14 | 2 Q | Canada; L 11 - 17 | did not advance | | |
| Scotland women's (WC) | Women's wheelchair tournament | Australia; L 5 - 12 | South Africa; W 16 - 2 | —N/a | 2 Q | —N/a | Canada; L 5 - 12 | England; L 10 - 12 | 4 |

=== Men's tournament ===
Roster

- Gareth Murray
- Fraser Malcolm
- Jonathan Bunyan
- Kyle Jimenez

Group A

| Pos | Team | Pld | W | L | PF | PA | PD | Qualification |
|---|---|---|---|---|---|---|---|---|
| 1 | Scotland | 3 | 3 | 0 | 52 | 43 | +9 | Direct to semi-finals |
| 2 | Canada | 3 | 2 | 1 | 56 | 41 | +15 | Quarter-finals |
| 3 | Kenya | 3 | 1 | 2 | 47 | 48 | −1 | Quarter-finals |
| 4 | Sri Lanka | 3 | 0 | 3 | 35 | 58 | −23 | |

Source: Birmingham 2022
Rules for classification: 1) Wins; 2) Head-to-head record; 3) Points scored.

29 July 2022
15:30

Report

| Sri Lanka | 9–16 | Scotland |
| Pts: Yogananthan 5 | | Pts: Malcolm 8 |

Smithfield

29 July 2022
19:30

Report

| Scotland | 21–20 | Canada |
| Pts: Malcolm 9 | | Pts: Gill, Jensen-Whyte, Johnson 6 |

Smithfield

31 July 2022
15:30

Report

| Kenya | 14–15 | Scotland |
| Pts: Omondi 6 | | Pts: Murray 7 |

Smithfield

Semifinals

1 August 2022
19:30

Report

| Scotland | 15–20 | Australia |
| Pts: Jimenez 11 | | Pts: Wagstaff 9 |

Smithfield

Bronze medal match

2 August 2022
15:00

Report

| Scotland | 12–13 | Canada |
| Pts: Jimenez 7 | | Pts: Gill 5 |

Smithfield

=== Women's tournament ===
Roster

- Hannah Robb
- Sian Phillips
- Claire Paxton
- Kennedy Leonard

Group A

| Pos | Team | Pld | W | L | PF | PA | PD | Qualification |
|---|---|---|---|---|---|---|---|---|
| 1 | Australia | 3 | 3 | 0 | 63 | 26 | +37 | Direct to semi-finals |
| 2 | Scotland | 3 | 2 | 1 | 45 | 40 | +5 | Quarter-finals |
| 3 | Kenya | 3 | 1 | 2 | 50 | 44 | +6 | Quarter-finals |
| 4 | Sri Lanka | 3 | 0 | 3 | 15 | 63 | −48 | |

Source: Birmingham 2022
Rules for classification: 1) Wins; 2) Head-to-head record; 3) Points scored.

29 July 2022
15:30

Report

| Australia | 21–9 | Scotland |
| Pts: Wilson 7 | | Pts: Leonard 5 |

Smithfield

29 July 2022
19:30

Report

| Scotland | 21–5 | Sri Lanka |
| Pts: Leonard 8 | | Pts: R.Perera 3 |

Smithfield

31 July 2022
15:30

Report

| Kenya | 14–15 | Scotland |
| Pts: Indasi 6 | | Pts: Leonard 9 |

Smithfield

Quarterfinals

1 August 2022
15:30

Report

| Scotland | 11–17 | Canada |
| Pts: Paxton, Phillips, Leonard 3 | | Pts: Wallack 6 |

Smithfield

=== Women's wheelchair tournament ===
Roster

- Robyn Love
- Judith Hamer
- Jessica Whyte
- Lynsey Speirs

Group B

| Pos | Team | Pld | W | L | PF | PA | PD | Qualification |
|---|---|---|---|---|---|---|---|---|
| 1 | Australia | 2 | 2 | 0 | 33 | 8 | +25 | Semi-finals |
| 2 | Scotland | 2 | 1 | 1 | 21 | 14 | +7 | Semi-finals |
| 3 | South Africa | 2 | 0 | 2 | 5 | 37 | −32 | 5th place match |

Source: Birmingham 2022
Rules for classification: 1) Wins; 2) Head-to-head record; 3) Points scored.

29 July 2022
19:30

Report

| Australia | 12–5 | Scotland |
| Pts: Merrit 5 | | Pts: Hamer 5 |

Smithfield

30 July 2022
19:30

Report

| Scotland | 16–2 | South Africa |
| Pts: Hamer 10 | | Pts: Moeng 2 |

Smithfield

Semifinals

1 August 2022
15:00

Report

| Canada | 12–5 | Scotland |
| Pts: Tessier, Dandeneau 5 | | Pts: Love 3 |

Smithfield

Bronze medal match

2 August 2022
15:00

Report

| Scotland | 10–12 | England |
| Pts: Hamer 5 | | Pts: Conroy 4 |

Smithfield

== Beach volleyball ==
As of 26 April 2022, Scotland qualified for the women's tournament; this was achieved through their position at the European Qualifier in Edinburgh.

Two players were officially selected on 1 June 2022.

| Athlete | Event | Preliminary Round | | | | Quarterfinals | Semifinals | Finals | Rank |
| Athlete | Event | Opposition Score | Opposition Score | Opposition Score | Rank | Opposition Score | Opposition Score | Opposition Score | Rank |
|---|---|---|---|---|---|---|---|---|---|
| Lynne Beattie; Melissa Coutts | Women's tournament | Pata / Toko (VAN); L 0 - 2 | Grimson / Mumby (ENG); L 0 - 2 | Gwali / Donga (SOL); W 2 - 0 | 3 Q | Artacho / Clancy (AUS); L 0 - 2 | did not advance | | |

=== Women's tournament ===
Group C

| Pos | Team | Pld | W | L | Pts | SW | SL | SR | SPW | SPL | SPR | Qualification |
|---|---|---|---|---|---|---|---|---|---|---|---|---|
| 1 | Pata – Toko (VAN) | 3 | 3 | 0 | 6 | 6 | 0 | MAX | 126 | 67 | 1.881 | Quarterfinals |
| 2 | Grimson – Mumby (ENG) | 3 | 2 | 1 | 5 | 4 | 2 | 2.000 | 112 | 90 | 1.244 | Quarterfinals |
| 3 | Beattie – Coutts (SCO) | 3 | 1 | 2 | 4 | 2 | 4 | 0.500 | 98 | 106 | 0.925 | Ranking of third-placed teams |
| 4 | Gwali – Donga (SOL) | 3 | 0 | 3 | 3 | 0 | 6 | 0.000 | 53 | 126 | 0.421 | |

Source: birmingham2022.com

| 31 July 2022; 14:30 | Pata – Toko (VAN) | 2–0 | Beattie – Coutts (SCO) | Smithfield |
| 31 July 2022; 14:30 | (21–10, 21–14); Report | | | Smithfield |

| 2 August 2022; 19:00 | Grimson – Mumby (ENG) | 2–0 | Beattie – Coutts (SCO) | Smithfield |
| 2 August 2022; 19:00 | (21–17, 21–15); Report | | | Smithfield |

| 4 August 2022; 14:30 | Beattie – Coutts (SCO) | 2–0 | Gwali – Donga (SOL) | Smithfield |
| 4 August 2022; 14:30 | (21–6, 21–16); Report | | | Smithfield |

Quarterfinals

| 5 August 2022; 14:30 | Beattie – Coutts (SCO) | 0–2 | Artacho – Clancy (AUS) | Smithfield |
| 5 August 2022; 14:30 | (11–21, 11–21); Report | | | Smithfield |

== Boxing ==
A squad of eight boxers was officially selected on 8 June 2022.

Men

| Athlete | Event | Round of 32 | Round of 16 | Quarterfinals | Semifinals | Final | |
| Athlete | Event | Opposition Result | Opposition Result | Opposition Result | Opposition Result | Opposition Result | Rank |
|---|---|---|---|---|---|---|---|
| Lennon Mulligan | Flyweight | —N/a | Temakau (KIR); W 5 - 0 | Panghal (IND); L 0 - 5 | did not advance | | |
| Matthew McHale | Bantamweight | —N/a | Breedy (BAR); W 3 - 2 | Shaharom (MAS); W RSC | Eagleson (NIR); L 2 - 3 | Did not advance | 3rd place, bronze medalist(s) |
| Reese Lynch | Light welterweight | Aaree (KIR); W RSC | Thapa (IND); W 4 - 1 | Jonas (NAM); W 5 - 0 | Sanford (CAN); W 5 - 0 | Colin (MRI); W 4 - 1 | 1st place, gold medalist(s) |
| Tyler Jolly | Welterweight | Bye | Hylton (JAM); W KO | Warupi (PNG); W 5 - 0 | Croft (WAL); L 1 - 4 | Did not advance | 3rd place, bronze medalist(s) |
| Stephen Newns | Light middleweight | Mengue (CMR); L 2 - 3 | did not advance | | | | |
| Sam Hickey | Middleweight | Bye | Mortley (LCA); W 5 - 0 | Benson (NGR); W RSC | Richardson (ENG); W RSC | Peters (AUS); W 3 - 2 | 1st place, gold medalist(s) |
| Sean Lazzerini | Light heavyweight | Bye | Rosalba (MRI); W RSC | Beausejour (CAN); W 5 - 0 | Changalawe (TAN); W 4 - 1 | Bevan (WAL); W 4 - 1 | 1st place, gold medalist(s) |

Women

| Athlete | Event | Round of 16 | Quarterfinals | Semifinals | Final | |
| Athlete | Event | Opposition Result | Opposition Result | Opposition Result | Opposition Result | Rank |
|---|---|---|---|---|---|---|
| Megan Reid | Lightweight | Richardson (ENG); L 0 - 5 | did not advance | | | |

== Cycling ==
A squad of seventeen cyclists and para cyclists (plus three pilots) was officially selected on 26 May 2022. Two cyclists were added to the squad on 24 June 2022.

On 13 July 2022 Team Scotland announced that Katie Archibald would not take part in the Games.

=== Road ===
Men

| Athlete | Event | Time | Rank |
|---|---|---|---|
| Charlie Aldridge | Road race | 3:37:08 | 45 |
| John Archibald | Road race | 3:37:08 | 26 |
| Finn Crockett | Road race | 3:28:29 | 3rd place, bronze medalist(s) |
| Sean Flynn | Road race | 3:28:55 | 10 |
| Miles Scotson | Road race | 3:36:46 | 16 |
| Mark Stewart | Road race | 3:36:46 | 18 |
| John Archibald | Time trial | 48:54.55 | 6 |
| Finn Crockett | Time trial | 52:42.37 | 22 |
| Mark Stewart | Time trial | 50:38.79 | 14 |

Women

| Athlete | Event | Time | Rank |
|---|---|---|---|
| Neah Evans | Road race | 2:44:46 | 2nd place, silver medalist(s) |
| Anna Shackley | Road race | 2:44:46 | 21 |
| Neah Evans | Time trial | 43:45.34 | 17 |
| Anna Shackley | Time trial | 42:48.77 | 10 |

=== Track ===
Sprint

| Athlete | Event | Qualification | | Round 1 | Quarterfinals | Semifinals | Final | |
| Athlete | Event | Time | Rank | Opposition Time | Opposition Time | Opposition Time | Opposition Time | Rank |
|---|---|---|---|---|---|---|---|---|
| Jack Carlin | Men's sprint | 9.599 | 3 Q | Fielding (SCO); W | Turnbull (ENG); W | Richardson (AUS); L | Glaetzer (AUS); W | 3rd place, bronze medalist(s) |
| Alistair Fielding | Men's sprint | 10.020 | 14 Q | Jack Carlin (SCO); L | did not advance | | | |
| Lauren Bell | Women's sprint | 10.956 | 10 Q | Orban (CAN); L | did not advance | | | |
| Iona Moir | Women's sprint | 11.193 | 15 Q | Capewell (ENG); L | did not advance | | | |
| Lusia Steele | Women's sprint | 11.171 | 13 Q | Finucane (WAL); L | did not advance | | | |
| Iona Moir; Lauren Bell; Lusia Steele | Women's team sprint | 48.650 | 6 | —N/a | | | did not advance | |
| Neil Fachie; Lewis Stewart (pilot) | Men's tandem sprint B | 9.807 | 1 Q | —N/a | | Pope/ Steffan (pilot) (WAL); W | Ball/ Rotherham (pilot) (WAL); L | 2nd place, silver medalist(s) |
| Libby Clegg; Jenny Holl (pilot) | Women's tandem sprint B | 11.898 | 4 Q | —N/a | | Gallagher/ Ward (pilot) (AUS); L | Unwin/ Holl (pilot) (ENG); L | 4 |
| Aileen McGlynn; Ellie Stone (pilot) | Women's tandem sprint B | 11.145 | 2 Q | —N/a | | Unwin/ Holl (pilot) (ENG); W | Gallagher/ Ward (pilot) (AUS); L | 2nd place, silver medalist(s) |

Keirin

| Athlete | Event | 1st Round | Repechage | Semifinals | Final |
| Athlete | Event | Rank | Rank | Rank | Rank |
|---|---|---|---|---|---|
| Jack Carlin | Men's keirin | 2 Q | Bye | 3 | 2nd place, silver medalist(s) |
| Alistair Fielding | Men's keirin | 4 R | 2 | did not advance | |
| Lauren Bell | Women's keirin | 3 R | 1 Q | 5 | 10 |
| Iona Moir | Women's keirin | 5 R | 4 | did not advance | |
| Lusia Steele | Women's keirin | 3 R | 2 | did not advance | |

Time trial

| Athlete | Event | Time | Rank |
|---|---|---|---|
| Jonny Wale | Men's time trial | DNS | |
| Lauren Bell | Women's time trial | 33.954 | 6 |
| Iona Moir | Women's time trial | 34.687 | 9 |
| Lusia Steele | Women's time trial | 35.002 | 12 |
| Neil Fachie; Lewis Stewart (pilot) | Men's tandem time trial B | 59.938 | 1st place, gold medalist(s) |
| Libby Clegg; Jenny Holl (pilot) | Women's tandem time trial B | 1:09.953 | 4 |
| Aileen McGlynn; Ellie Stone (pilot) | Women's tandem time trial B | 1:07.578 | 3rd place, bronze medalist(s) |

Pursuit

| Athlete | Event | Qualification | | Final | |
| Athlete | Event | Time | Rank | Opponent Results | Rank |
|---|---|---|---|---|---|
| John Archibald | Men's individual pursuit | 4:12.541 | 7 | did not advance | |
| Kyle Gordon | Men's individual pursuit | 4:10.592 | 5 | did not advance | |
| Jonny Wale | Men's individual pursuit | 4:23.353 | 15 | did not advance | |
| Neah Evans | Women's individual pursuit | 3:23.476 | 3 QB | Roy (AUS); W | 3rd place, bronze medalist(s) |

Points race

| Athlete | Event | Final | |
| Athlete | Event | Points | Rank |
|---|---|---|---|
| John Archibald | Men's point race | 16 | 4 |
| Kyle Gordon | Men's point race | DNS | |
| Mark Stewart | Men's point race | 15 | 5 |
| Neah Evans | Women's points race | 36 | 2nd place, silver medalist(s) |

Scratch race

| Athlete | Event | Qualification | Final |
|---|---|---|---|
| John Archibald | Men's scratch race | 4 Q | 2nd place, silver medalist(s) |
| Kyle Gordon | Men's scratch race | 7 Q | DNS |
| Mark Stewart | Men's scratch race | 8 Q | 11 |
| Neah Evans | Women's scratch race | —N/a | 4 |

=== Mountain Biking ===
| Athlete | Event | Time | Rank |
|---|---|---|---|
| Charlie Aldridge | Men’s cross-country | LAP | |
| Isla Short | Women’s cross-country | 1:37:07 | 4 |

== Diving ==
One diver was officially selected on 13 December 2021. A squad of seven divers was later confirmed on 16 June 2022, with an eighth diver added on 11 July 2022.

Men

| Athlete | Events | Semifinal | | Final | |
| Athlete | Events | Points | Rank | Points | Rank |
|---|---|---|---|---|---|
| Ross Beattie | 1 m springboard | 308.55 | 9 Q | 300.60 | 10 |
| James Heatly | 1 m springboard | 387.55 | 2 Q | 401.00 | 4 |
| Danny Mabbott | 1 m springboard | 287.25 | 10 Q | 318.45 | 9 |
| Ross Beattie | 3 m springboard | 377.00 | 9 Q | 365.00 | 11 |
| Cameron Gammage | 3 m springboard | 325.50 | 13 R | did not advance | |
| James Heatly | 3 m springboard | 423.40 | 4 Q | 460.40 | 4 |
| Angus Menmuir | 10 m platform | 341.55 | 10 Q | 354.20 | 11 |
| Ross Beattie; James Heatly | 3 m synchronised springboard | —N/a | | 369.27 | 4 |

Women

| Athlete | Events | Semifinal | | Final | |
| Athlete | Events | Points | Rank | Points | Rank |
|---|---|---|---|---|---|
| Clara Kerr | 1 m springboard | 206.65 | 11 Q | 239.95 | 8 |
| Grace Reid | 1 m springboard | 259.10 | 5 Q | 268.15 | 4 |
| Clara Kerr | 3 m springboard | 235.10 | 11 Q | 264.00 | 11 |
| Grace Reid | 3 m springboard | 285.55 | 4 Q | 300.60 | 8 |
| Gemma McArthur | 10 m platform | 290.55 | 6 Q | 290.90 | 9 |

Mixed

| Athlete | Events | Final | |
| Athlete | Events | Points | Rank |
|---|---|---|---|
| Danny Mabbott; Clara Kerr | 3 m synchronised springboard | 212.70 | 10 |
| James Heatly; Grace Reid | 3 m synchronised springboard | 306.00 | 1st place, gold medalist(s) |
| Angus Menmuir; Gemma McArthur | 10 m synchronised platform | 289.62 | 7 |

== Gymnastics ==
A squad of seven gymnasts was officially selected on 6 June 2022. Another three gymnasts were added on 1 July 2022.

=== Artistic ===
Men
Team Final & Individual Qualification

| Athlete | Event | Apparatus | | | | | | Total | Rank |
| Athlete | Event | F | PH | R | V | PB | HB | Total | Rank |
|---|---|---|---|---|---|---|---|---|---|
| Frank Baines | Team | 13.300 Q | 12.650 | 13.200 | 14.150 | 13.350 | 13.250 Q | 79.900 | 6 Q |
| Hamish Carter | Team | 11.800 | 12.850 | ~~12.900~~ | 13.800 | 13.600 | 13.500 Q | 78.450 | 10 |
| Pavel Karnejenko | Team | ~~11.650~~ | ~~12.300~~ | 14.200 Q | 13.950 | 13.800 | 12.550 | 78.450 | 9 Q |
| Cameron Lynn | Team | —N/a | 13.000 | 13.000 | —N/a | ~~12.650~~ | ~~12.050~~ | —N/a | |
| David Weir | Team | 11.850 | —N/a | | ~~12.950~~ | —N/a | | | |
| Total | Team | 36.950 | 38.500 | 40.400 | 41.900 | 40.750 | 39.300 | 237.800 | 5 |

Individual Finals

| Athlete | Event | Apparatus | | | | | | Total | Rank |
| Athlete | Event | F | PH | R | V | PB | HB | Total | Rank |
|---|---|---|---|---|---|---|---|---|---|
| Frank Baines | All-around | 13.350 | 12.900 | 12.950 | 13.750 | 13.250 | 13.250 | 79.450 | 7 |
| Frank Baines | Floor | 13.566 | —N/a | | | | | 13.566 | 6 |
| Frank Baines | Horizontal bar | —N/a | | | | | 11.900 | 11.900 | 8 |
| Hamish Carter | Horizontal bar | —N/a | | | | | 12.433 | 12.433 | 6 |
| Pavel Karnejenko | All-around | 12.750 | 13.150 | 14.150 | 14.300 | 13.400 | 12.900 | 80.650 | 5 |
| Pavel Karnejenko | Rings | —N/a | | 13.766 | —N/a | | | 13.766 | 6 |

Women
Team Final & Individual Qualification

| Athlete | Event | Apparatus | | | | Total | Rank |
| Athlete | Event | V | UB | BB | F | Total | Rank |
|---|---|---|---|---|---|---|---|
| Shannon Archer | Team | 13.900 Q | 12.250 Q | 11.950 | 12.400 | 50.500 | 6 Q |
| Cara Kennedy | Team | 13.350 Q | ~~10.700~~ | 11.700 | 12.250 | 48.000 | 14 Q |
| Eilidh Gorrell | Team | ~~11.700~~ | 10.750 | ~~11.350~~ | ~~11.700~~ | 45.500 | 18 |
| Emily Bremner | Team | 12.850 | 11.550 | 11.500 | 12.050 | 47.950 | 15 |
| Total | Team | 40.100 | 34.550 | 35.150 | 36.700 | 146.500 | 6 |

Individual Finals

| Athlete | Event | Apparatus | | | | Total | Rank |
| Athlete | Event | V | UB | BB | F | Total | Rank |
|---|---|---|---|---|---|---|---|
| Shannon Archer | All-around | 13.700 | 11.400 | 12.700 | 11.500 | 49.300 | 8 |
| Shannon Archer | Vault | 13.083 | —N/a | | | 13.083 | 3rd place, bronze medalist(s) |
| Shannon Archer | Uneven bars | —N/a | 12.366 | —N/a | | 12.366 | 8 |
| Cara Kennedy | All-around | 12.200 | 11.450 | 10.850 | 12.200 | 46.700 | 14 |
| Cara Kennedy | Vault | 12.633 | —N/a | | | 12.633 | 6 |

=== Rhythmic ===
Individual Qualification

| Athlete | Event | Apparatus | | | | Total | Rank |
| Athlete | Event | Hoop | Ball | Clubs | Ribbon | Total | Rank |
|---|---|---|---|---|---|---|---|
| Louise Christie | Qualification | 25.300 | 25.050 | 27.650 Q | 25.900 Q | 103.900 | 11 Q |

Individual Finals

| Athlete | Event | Apparatus | | | | Total | Rank |
| Athlete | Event | Hoop | Ball | Clubs | Ribbon | Total | Rank |
|---|---|---|---|---|---|---|---|
| Louise Christie | All-around | 27.000 | 25.700 | 27.600 | 24.300 | 104.600 | 10 |

| Athlete | Apparatus | Score | Rank |
|---|---|---|---|
| Louise Christie | Clubs | 27.550 | 6 |
| Louise Christie | Ribbon | 27.550 | 2nd place, silver medalist(s) |

== Hockey ==
By virtue of their position in the FIH World Rankings for men and women respectively (as of 1 February 2022), Scotland qualified for both tournaments.

Detailed fixtures were released on 9 March 2022. The women's squad was announced on 13 June 2022, followed by the men's squad on 5 July 2022.

Summary

Key:

- FT = After full time
- P = Match decided by penalty-shootout

| Team | Event | Preliminary round | | | | | Semifinal | Final / BM / PM | |
| Team | Event | Opposition Result | Opposition Result | Opposition Result | Opposition Result | Rank | Opposition Result | Opposition Result | Rank |
|---|---|---|---|---|---|---|---|---|---|
| Scotland men | Men's tournament | New Zealand; D 5–5 | Australia; L 0–12 | South Africa; L 4–5 | Pakistan; L 2–3 | 5 | —N/a | Ghana; W 7–2 | 9 |
| Scotland women | Women's tournament | South Africa; W 4–2 | New Zealand; L 0–1 | Kenya; W 11–0 | Australia; L 0-2 | 3 | —N/a | Canada; L 1-3 | 6 |

=== Men's tournament ===
- Tommy Alexander
- Michael Bremner
- Andy Bull
- Murray Collins
- Callum Duke
- Rob Field
- David Forrester
- Alan Forsyth (c)
- Cammy Golden
- Jamie Golden
- Ed Greaves
- Rob Harwood
- Callum Mackenzie
- Andy McConnell
- Lee Morton
- Duncan Riddell
- Robbie Shepherdson
- Struan Walker

Group play

| Pos | Team | Pld | W | D | L | GF | GA | GD | Pts | Qualification |
|---|---|---|---|---|---|---|---|---|---|---|
| 1 | Australia | 4 | 4 | 0 | 0 | 29 | 2 | +27 | 12 | Semi-finals |
| 2 | South Africa | 4 | 2 | 1 | 1 | 11 | 12 | −1 | 7 | Semi-finals |
| 3 | New Zealand | 4 | 1 | 1 | 2 | 14 | 17 | −3 | 4 | Fifth place match |
| 4 | Pakistan | 4 | 1 | 1 | 2 | 6 | 15 | −9 | 4 | Seventh place match |
| 5 | Scotland | 4 | 0 | 1 | 3 | 11 | 25 | −14 | 1 | Ninth place match |

Source: Birmingham 2022
Rules for classification: 1) points; 2) number of wins; 3) goal difference; 4) goals scored; 5) head-to-head results.

29 July 2022
21:00

| New Zealand | 5–5 | Scotland |
|---|---|---|
| Russell 26'; Lane 43'; Smith 47'; Inglis 49'; Hiha 51' | Report | Harwood 6'; Mackenzie 17'; J. Golden 20', 28'; C. Golden 24' |

Umpires:
Tyler Klenk (CAN)
Peter Kabaso (KEN)

31 July 2022
11:00

| Australia | 12–0 | Scotland |
|---|---|---|
| Govers 9'; Brand 13', 32'; Hayward 13', 25', 37', 53'; Wickham 16', 18'; Simmonds 33'; Ephraums 35', 50' | Report |

Umpires:
Deepak Joshi (IND)
Bruce Bale (ENG)

1 August 2022
14:00

| Scotland | 4–5 | South Africa |
|---|---|---|
| McConnell 33'; Forsyth 35'; C. Golden 38'; Walker 43' | Report | D. Cassiem 2'; Spooner 24'; Ntuli 43'; Guise-Brown 56'; Paton 60' |

Umpires:
Nick Bennett (ENG)
Steve Rogers (AUS)

3 August 2022
19:00

| Pakistan | 3–2 | Scotland |
|---|---|---|
| Hakeem 22'; Shahid 23'; Khan 55' | Report | C. Golden 9'; Walker 38' |

Umpires:
Tyler Klenk (CAN)
Sean Rapaport (RSA)

Ninth place match

6 August 2022
09:00

| Scotland | 7–2 | Ghana |
|---|---|---|
| Walker 7'; C. Golden 19'; J. Golden 36', 51'; Harwood 46'; Duke 47'; Morton 53' | Report | Ankomah 33'; Tettey 54' |

Umpires:
Peter Kabaso (KEN)
Ilanggo Kanabathu (MAS)

=== Women's tournament ===
Roster

- Amy Costello
- Amy Gibson
- Becky Ward
- Bronwyn Shields
- Charlotte Watson
- Ellie Wilson
- Eve Pearson
- Fiona Burnet
- Heather McEwan
- Jennifer Eadie
- Jessica Ross
- Katie Robertson (vc)
- Louise Campbell
- Millie Steiger
- Nicki Cochrane
- Robyn Collins
- Sarah Jamieson
- Sarah Robertson (c)

Group play

| Pos | Team | Pld | W | D | L | GF | GA | GD | Pts | Qualification |
|---|---|---|---|---|---|---|---|---|---|---|
| 1 | Australia | 4 | 4 | 0 | 0 | 16 | 0 | +16 | 12 | Semi-finals |
| 2 | New Zealand | 4 | 3 | 0 | 1 | 21 | 2 | +19 | 9 | Semi-finals |
| 3 | Scotland | 4 | 2 | 0 | 2 | 15 | 5 | +10 | 6 | Fifth place match |
| 4 | South Africa | 4 | 1 | 0 | 3 | 18 | 13 | +5 | 3 | Seventh place match |
| 5 | Kenya | 4 | 0 | 0 | 4 | 0 | 50 | −50 | 0 | Ninth place match |

Source: Birmingham 2022
Rules for classification: 1) points; 2) number of wins; 3) goal difference; 4) goals scored; 5) head-to-head results.

29 July 2022
11:00

| South Africa | 2–4 | Scotland |
|---|---|---|
| Deetlefs 8', 12' | Report | Watson 7'; S. Robertson 19'; Burnet 32'; Eadie 53' |

Umpires:
Hannah Harrison (ENG)
Cathy Wright (WAL)

30 July 2022
21:00

| New Zealand | 1–0 | Scotland |
|---|---|---|
| Tynan 9' | Report |

Umpires:
Aleisha Neumann (AUS)
Rebecca Woodcock (ENG)

1 August 2022
11:00

| Scotland | 11–0 | Kenya |
|---|---|---|
| Burnet 3', 45'; Watson 6', 27'; Eadie 7'; Jamieson 11', 42'; Campbell 13'; Costello 15+'; Shields 48'; K. Robertson 56' | Report |

Umpires:
Hannah Harrison (ENG)
Rhiannon Murrie (AUS)

3 August 2022
09:00

| Australia | 2–0 | Scotland |
|---|---|---|
| Stewart 28'; Tonkin 47' | Report |

Umpires:
Cathy Wright (WAL)
Amber Church (NZL)

Fifth place match

7 August 2022
11:15

| Canada | 3–1 | Scotland |
|---|---|---|
| Haughn 4', 17'; Johansen 41' | Report | Costello 15' |

Umpires:
Katrina Turner (NZL)
Hannah Harrison (ENG)

== Judo ==
A squad of eleven judoka was officially selected on 8 June 2022.

Men

| Athlete | Event | Round of 32 | Round of 16 | Quarterfinals | Semifinals | Repechage | Final/BM | |
| Athlete | Event | Opposition Result | Opposition Result | Opposition Result | Opposition Result | Opposition Result | Opposition Result | Rank |
|---|---|---|---|---|---|---|---|---|
| David Ferguson | -60 kg | Bye | Rabbitt (WAL); L 00 - 10 | did not advance | | | | |
| Dylan Munro | -60 kg | Bye | Wimukthi (SRI); W 10 - 00 | McKenzie (ENG); L 00 - 01 | Did not advance | Yadav (IND); L 00 - 01 | Did not advance | 7 |
| Finlay Allan | -66 kg | —N/a | Nassone (MOZ); W 10 - 00 | Mungandu (ZAM); W 10 - 00 | Saini (IND); W 10 - 00 | —N/a | Balarjishvili (CYP); L 00 - 10 | 2nd place, silver medalist(s) |
| Alexander Short | -66 kg | —N/a | Chikwapula (MAW); W 10 - 00 | Varey (WAL); W 10 - 00 | Balarjishvili (CYP); L 00 - 01 | —N/a | Burns (NIR); L 00 - 10 | 5 |
| Billy Rodman | -73 kg | —N/a | Bensted (AUS); L 00 - 01 | did not advance | | | | |
| Andrew McWatt | +100 kg | —N/a | Bye | Park (AUS); L 00 - 10 | Did not advance | Antoniou (CYP); W 10 - 00 | Perrinne (MRI); L 00 - 01 | 5 |

Women

| Athlete | Event | Round of 16 | Quarterfinals | Semifinals | Repechage | Final/BM | |
| Athlete | Event | Opposition Result | Opposition Result | Opposition Result | Opposition Result | Opposition Result | Rank |
|---|---|---|---|---|---|---|---|
| Kirsty Marsh | -52 kg | Kalomor (VAN); W 11 - 00 | Deguchi (CAN); L 00 - 10 | Did not advance | Ferreira (MOZ); L 00 - 10 | Did not advance | 7 |
| Kimberley Renicks | -52 kg | Asvesta (CYP); L 00 - 10 | did not advance | | | | |
| Malin Wilson | -57 kg | Segaran (MAS); W 10 - 00 | Toprak (ENG); L 00 - 10 | Did not advance | Christie (NZL); W 10 - 00 | Nairne (ENG); W 10 - 00 | 3rd place, bronze medalist(s) |
| Rachel Tytler | -78 kg | —N/a | Reid (ENG); L 00 - 10 | Did not advance | Mackey (NZL); W 11 - 00 | Godbout (CAN); W 10 - 00 | 3rd place, bronze medalist(s) |
| Sarah Adlington | +78 kg | Bye | Kana (KEN); W 10 - 00 | Paduch (AUS); W 01 - 00 | —N/a | Maan (IND); W 10 - 01 | 1st place, gold medalist(s) |

== Lawn bowls ==
A squad of ten bowlers (five per gender) was officially selected on 15 December 2021. Eight para bowlers (four per gender) were added on 18 February 2022.

Among those chosen was George Miller, potentially the oldest Team Scotland competitor in history (he was 75 years and 8 months of age during the Games).

Men

| Athlete | Event | Group Stage | | | | | Quarterfinal | Semifinal | Final / BM | |
| Athlete | Event | Opposition Score | Opposition Score | Opposition Score | Opposition Score | Rank | Opposition Score | Opposition Score | Opposition Score | Rank |
|---|---|---|---|---|---|---|---|---|---|---|
| Iain McLean | Singles | Locke (FLK); W 21 - 5 | Borgohain (IND); L 19 - 21 | Davis (JEY); W 21 - 13 | McIlroy (NZL); W 21 - 4 | 1 Q | Bester (CAN); W 21 - 4 | Wilson (AUS); L 9 - 21 | Abd Muin (MAS); W 21 - 11 | 3rd place, bronze medalist(s) |
| Paul Foster; Alex Marshall | Pairs | Jersey; W 22 - 7 | Niue; W 23 - 10 | Canada; W 18 - 11 | New Zealand; W 15 - 11 | 1 Q | Fiji; W 20 - 7 | England; L 13 - 19 | Northern Ireland; W 25 - 5 | 3rd place, bronze medalist(s) |
| Stewart Anderson; Darren Burnett; Iain McLean | Triples | Malta; W 28 - 6 | India; W 19 - 12 | New Zealand; W 15 - 14 | —N/a | 1 Q | Wales; L 12 - 17 | did not advance | | |
| Stewart Anderson; Darren Burnett; Paul Foster; Alex Marshall | Fours | Malta; W 17 - 9 | Jersey; L 8 - 13 | South Africa; W 15 - 10 | New Zealand; W 18 - 10 | 1 Q | Northern Ireland; L 15 - 18 | did not advance | | |

Women

| Athlete | Event | Group Stage | | | | | Quarterfinal | Semifinal | Final / BM | |
| Athlete | Event | Opposition Score | Opposition Score | Opposition Score | Opposition Score | Rank | Opposition Score | Opposition Score | Opposition Score | Rank |
|---|---|---|---|---|---|---|---|---|---|---|
| Dee Hoggan | Singles | Choudhury (IND); W 21 - 10 | O'Neill (NIR); W 21 - 14 | A-Almond (FLK); W 21 - 5 | Daniels (WAL); W 21 - 14 | 1 Q | Ryan (AUS); L 9 - 21 | did not advance | | |
| Claire Johnston; Hannah Smith | Pairs | Fiji; W 16 - 13 | Northern Ireland; L 12 - 18 | England; L 7 - 19 | —N/a | 4 | did not advance | | | |
| Lauren Baillie; Caroline Brown; Dee Hoggan | Triples | Botswana; W 25 - 5 | Cook Islands; L 13 - 24 | Wales; L 14 - 16 | —N/a | 3 | did not advance | | | |
| Lauren Baillie; Caroline Brown; Claire Johnston; Hannah Smith | Fours | Fiji; L 12 - 13 | Botswana; L 11 - 21 | Australia; W 16 - 9 | —N/a | 4 | did not advance | | | |

Parasport

| Athlete | Event | Group Stage | | | | | | Semifinal | Final / BM | |
| Athlete | Event | Opposition Score | Opposition Score | Opposition Score | Opposition Score | Opposition Score | Rank | Opposition Score | Opposition Score | Rank |
|---|---|---|---|---|---|---|---|---|---|---|
| Garry Brown; Kevin Wallace | Men's pairs B6-8 | England; W 23 - 12 | Wales; W 19 - 9 | South Africa; W 18 - 10 | Australia; L 15 - 21 | New Zealand; W 25 - 5 | 1 Q | New Zealand; W 18 - 10 | Australia; W 16 - 7 | 1st place, gold medalist(s) |
| Rosemary Lenton; Pauline Wilson | Women's pairs B6-8 | Australia; L 15 - 16 | South Africa; L 11 - 23 | New Zealand; W 15 - 12 | England; L 7 - 19 | —N/a | 4 Q | England; W 16 - 10 | Australia; W 17 - 5 | 1st place, gold medalist(s) |
| Robert Barr directed by Sarah Jane Ewing; Melanie Inness directed by George Miller | Mixed pairs B2-3 | South Africa; W 28 - 6 | New Zealand; W 18 - 11 | Australia; W 10 - 8 | England; W 17 - 9 | Wales; W 15 - 8 | 1 Q | England; W 21 - 6 | Wales; W 16 - 9 | 1st place, gold medalist(s) |

== Netball ==
By virtue of its position in the World Netball Rankings (as of 31 January 2022), Scotland qualified for the tournament.

Complete fixtures were announced in March 2022.

Summary

| Team | Event | Group stage | | | | | | Semifinal | Final / BM / Cl. | |
| Team | Event | Opposition Result | Opposition Result | Opposition Result | Opposition Result | Opposition Result | Rank | Opposition Result | Opposition Result | Rank |
|---|---|---|---|---|---|---|---|---|---|---|
| Scotland women | Women's tournament | Australia; L 30 - 83 | Wales; L 42 - 48 | Jamaica; L 34 - 76 | Barbados; W 72 - 28 | South Africa; L 46 - 65 | 5 | —N/a | Northern Ireland; W 43 - 33 | 9 |

Roster

Twelve players were selected on 8 June 2022.

- Claire Maxwell (c)
- Emily Nicholl (vc)
- Lynsey Gallagher
- Niamh McCall
- Emma Barrie
- Iona Christian
- Hannah Leighton
- Sarah MacPhail
- Lauren Tait
- Rachel Conway
- Bethan Goodwin
- Kelly Boyle

Group play

| Pos | Team | Pld | W | D | L | GF | GA | GD | Pts | Qualification |
|---|---|---|---|---|---|---|---|---|---|---|
| 1 | Jamaica | 5 | 5 | 0 | 0 | 378 | 205 | +173 | 10 | Semi-finals |
| 2 | Australia | 5 | 4 | 0 | 1 | 386 | 187 | +199 | 8 | Semi-finals |
| 3 | South Africa | 5 | 3 | 0 | 2 | 323 | 275 | +48 | 6 | Classification matches |
| 4 | Wales | 5 | 2 | 0 | 3 | 235 | 306 | −71 | 4 | Classification matches |
| 5 | Scotland | 5 | 1 | 0 | 4 | 224 | 302 | −78 | 2 | Classification matches |
| 6 | Barbados | 5 | 0 | 0 | 5 | 150 | 421 | −271 | 0 | Classification matches |

Source: Birmingham 2022

| 30 July 2022; 12:00 | Report | Australia | 83–30 | Scotland | National Exhibition Centre; Umpires: Tracy-Ann Griffiths; Anso Kemp |
| 30 July 2022; 12:00 | Report | Austin 10/13 (77%); Bueta 33/34 (97%); Koenen 36/37 (97%); Wood 4/4 (100%) | | Barrie 7/8 (88%); Goodwin 15/16 (94%); Love 2/4 (50%); McCall 6/10 (60%) | National Exhibition Centre; Umpires: Tracy-Ann Griffiths; Anso Kemp |

| 31 July 2022; 20:00 | Report | Scotland | 42–48 | Wales | National Exhibition Centre; Umpires: Ken Metekingi; Kate Wright |
| 31 July 2022; 20:00 | Report | Barrie 15/22 (68%); Goodwin 20/27 (74%); McCall 7/13 (54%) | | Creak 12/16 (75%); Rowe 36/38 (95%) | National Exhibition Centre; Umpires: Ken Metekingi; Kate Wright |

| 2 August 2022; 14:00 | Report | Jamaica | 78–34 | Scotland | National Exhibition Centre; Umpires: Joshua Bowring; Alison Harrison |
| 2 August 2022; 14:00 | Report | Beckford 5/6 (83%); Fowler 37/37 (100%); Nelson 33/35 (94%); Robison 3/6 (50%) | | Barrie 12/17 (71%); Goodwin 18/19 (95%); McCall 4/8 (50%) | National Exhibition Centre; Umpires: Joshua Bowring; Alison Harrison |

| 3 August 2022; 18:00 | Report | Scotland | 72–28 | Barbados | National Exhibition Centre; Umpires: Tara Warner; Kate Wright |
| 3 August 2022; 18:00 | Report | Barrie 20/25 (80%); Goodwin 30/34 (88%); McCall 22/25 (88%) | | Agard 19/23 (83%); Holder 4/6 (67%); Wharton 5/8 (63%) | National Exhibition Centre; Umpires: Tara Warner; Kate Wright |

| 4 August 2022; 19:00 | Report | South Africa | 65–46 | Scotland | National Exhibition Centre; Umpires: Ken Metekingi; Kate Wright |
| 4 August 2022; 19:00 | Report | Rademan 6/7 (86%) van der Berg 17/17 (100%); Venter 42/44 (95%) | | Barrie 12/14 (86%); Goodwin 21/25 (84%); McCall 13/15 (87%) | National Exhibition Centre; Umpires: Ken Metekingi; Kate Wright |

Ninth place match

| 5 August 2022; 11:30 | Report | Scotland | 43–33 | Northern Ireland | National Exhibition Centre; Umpires: Louise Travis; Alison Harrison |
| 5 August 2022; 11:30 | Report | Goodwin 23/27 (85%); McCall 20/26 (77%) | | Bowman 4/8 (50%); Crosbie 17/24 (71%); Magee 12/17 (71%) | National Exhibition Centre; Umpires: Louise Travis; Alison Harrison |

== Para powerlifting ==
As of 8 June 2022, Scotland qualified one powerlifter through the World Para Powerlifting Commonwealth Rankings (for performances between 1 January 2020 and 25 April 2022).

| Athlete | Event | Result | Rank |
|---|---|---|---|
| Micky Yule (Note: In the men's heavyweight category in the para powerlifting, gold medal winner Sudhir was later disqualified for doping violations, and stripped off his medal. Hence, Nigeria's Ikechukwu Obichukwu was upgraded to gold, Scotland's Micky Yule to silver, and Australia's Ben Wright was awarded the bronze medal.) | Men's heavyweight | 130.9 | 2nd place, silver medalist(s) |

== Rugby sevens ==
As of 26 October 2021, Scotland officially qualified for both the men's and women's tournaments. The men achieved qualification through their positions in the 2018–19 / 2019–20 World Rugby Sevens Series, whereas the women achieved qualification via the Moscow round of the 2021 Rugby Europe Women's Sevens Championship Series.

Both squads were confirmed on 8 July 2022.

Summary

| Team | Event | Preliminary Round | | | | Quarterfinal / CQ | Semifinal / CS | Final / BM / CF | |
| Team | Event | Opposition Result | Opposition Result | Opposition Result | Rank | Opposition Result | Opposition Result | Opposition Result | Rank |
|---|---|---|---|---|---|---|---|---|---|
| Scotland men's | Men's tournament | Tonga; W 41–0 | Malaysia; W 50–12 | South Africa; L 0–34 | 2 Q | Fiji; L 7–34 | Classification semifinal Kenya; W 22–12 | 5th place final Samoa; L 19–24 | 6 |
| Scotland women's | Women's tournament | Fiji; L 12–31 | Australia; L 0–50 | South Africa; W 33–12 | 3 | —N/a | Classification semifinal Sri Lanka; W 58–0 | 5th place final England; L 5–29 | 6 |

=== Men's tournament ===
Roster

- Jamie Farndale (c)
- Alec Coombes
- Ross McCann
- Grant Hughes
- Paddy Kelly
- Kaleem Barreto
- Robbie Fergusson
- Matt Davidson
- Harvey Elms
- Lee Jones
- Jordan Edmunds
- Femi Sofolarin
- Jacob Henry

Pool B

| Pos | Team | Pld | W | D | L | PF | PA | PD | Pts | Qualification |
|---|---|---|---|---|---|---|---|---|---|---|
| 1 | South Africa | 3 | 3 | 0 | 0 | 116 | 5 | +111 | 9 | Advance to Quarter-finals |
| 2 | Scotland | 3 | 2 | 0 | 1 | 91 | 46 | +45 | 7 | Advance to Quarter-finals |
| 3 | Tonga | 3 | 1 | 0 | 2 | 36 | 84 | −48 | 5 | Advance to classification Quarter-finals |
| 4 | Malaysia | 3 | 0 | 0 | 3 | 19 | 127 | −108 | 3 | Advance to classification Quarter-finals |

Source: Birmingham2022
Rules for classification: 1) Points; 2) Head-to-head result; 3) Point difference; 4) Points scored.

29 July 2022
12:18

| Scotland | 41–0 | Tonga |
| Try: Sofolarin (3) 1' c, 4' m, 7' m Henry 8' c Edmunds 9' m Farndale 12' m Coombes 14' c Con: Barreto (2/4) 1', 9'; Elms (0/2); Barreto (1/1) 14'; Cards: Elms (yellow card) 13' | Report |

Coventry Stadium, Coventry
Referee: Adam Leal (England)

29 July 2022
20:26

| Scotland | 50–12 | Malaysia |
| Try: Davidson 1' c Jones (2) 2' c, 5' c Coombes 6' m Henry (3) 8' m, 9 m, 10' c Sofolarin 13' c Con: Davidson (5/8) 1', 2', 5', 10', 14' | Report | Try: Mat Zizi 3' c Nasarrudin 7' m Con: Mat Zizi (1/2) 4' |

Coventry Stadium, Coventry
Referee: Talal-Azmat Chaudhry (Canada)

30 July 2022
12:18

| South Africa | 34–0 | Scotland |
| Try: S. Davids 4' m Pretorius 6' m A. Davids (3) 8' c, 10' m, 12' m Williams 14' c Con: Brown (0/2); S. Davids (1/1) 9'; Williams (0/1); Human (1/2) 14' | Report |

Coventry Stadium, Coventry
Referee: Nick Hogan (New Zealand)

Quarterfinals

30 July 2022
20:26

| Fiji | 34–7 | Scotland |
| Try: Nacuqu (2) 2' m, 8' c Rasaku 5' c Mocenacagi 7' m Matana 10' m Maqala 12' m Con: Nacuqu (1/3) 8'; Rasaku (1/2) 5'; Sauturaga (0/1) | Report | Try: Edmunds 14' c Con: Davidson (1/1) 14' |

Coventry Stadium, Coventry
Referee: Ben Breakspear (Wales)

5th-8th Semifinals

31 July 2022
11:58

| Kenya | 12–22 | Scotland |
| Try: Oyoo 8' m Taabu 11' c Con: Omondi (1/2) 12' | Report | Try: Edmunds 4' m Barreto 7' m Elms 13' c McCann 14' m Con: Barreto (1/4) 13' |

Coventry Stadium, Coventry
Referee: Nick Hogan (New Zealand)

Fifth place match

31 July 2022
19:28

| Scotland | 19–24 | Samoa |
| Try: Fergusson 6' m Sofolarin 8' c, 9' c Con: Barreto (2/3) 8', 9' | Report | Try: Niue 1' c Onosai 7' m Leitufia 11' c, 12' m Con: Matavao (1/1) 1'; Purcell (1/3) 11' |

Coventry Stadium, Coventry
Referee: Morné Ferreira (South Africa)

=== Women's tournament ===
Roster

- Rachel McLachlan
- Emma Orr
- Megan Gaffney
- Eilidh Sinclair
- Evie Gallagher
- Lisa Thomson (co-c)
- Helen Nelson (co-c)
- Caity Mattinson
- Chloe Rollie
- Meryl Smith
- Shona Campbell
- Liz Musgrove
- Rhona Lloyd

Pool B

| Pos | Team | Pld | W | D | L | PF | PA | PD | Pts | Qualification |
|---|---|---|---|---|---|---|---|---|---|---|
| 1 | Fiji | 3 | 3 | 0 | 0 | 91 | 24 | +67 | 9 | Semi-finals |
| 2 | Australia | 3 | 2 | 0 | 1 | 100 | 19 | +81 | 7 | Semi-finals |
| 3 | Scotland | 3 | 1 | 0 | 2 | 45 | 93 | −48 | 5 | Classification semi-finals |
| 4 | South Africa | 3 | 0 | 0 | 3 | 12 | 112 | −100 | 3 | Classification semi-finals |

Updated to match(es) played on 29 July 2022. Source: Birmingham2022
Rules for classification: 1) Points; 2) Head-to-head result; 3) Point difference; 4) Points scored.

29 July 2022
09:22

| Fiji | 31–12 | Scotland |
| Try: Uluinisau 3' c Buleki 7' c Cavuru 8' c Donu 12' m Riwai 14' m Con: Cavuru (2/2) 3', 8'; Naimasi (1/2) 9'; Uluinisau (0/1) | Report | Try: Campbell 5' m Lloyd 10' c Con: Thomson (0/1); Nelson (1/1) 11' |

Coventry Stadium, Coventry
Referee: Ashleigh Murray-Pretorius (South Africa)

29 July 2022
17:52

| Australia | 50–0 | Scotland |
| Try: Levi (3) 1' c, 7' c, 9' m Paki (2) 3' c, 10' m Williams 6' c Nathan 8' m Southwell 13' c Con: Hinds (2/2) 2', 4'; Williams (2/5) 7', 7'; Southwell (1/1) 13' | Report |

Coventry Stadium, Coventry
Referee: Selica Winiata (New Zealand)

30 July 2022
09:00

| Scotland | 33–12 | South Africa |
| Try: Lloyd (3) 2' c, 4' m, 13' c McLachlan 3' c Orr 7' c Con: Thomson (3/4) 3', 4', 7'; Smith (1/1) 14' | Report | Try: Lategan 1' m Snyders 10' c Con: Shongwe (0/1); Snyders (1/1) 10'; Cards: Masuku (yellow card) 12' |

Coventry Stadium, Coventry
Referee: Tyler Miller (Australia)

5th-8th Semifinals

30 July 2022
17:52

| Scotland | 58–0 | Sri Lanka |
| Try: Lloyd (4) 1' m, 6' c, 7' c, 8' m Thomson 1' m Gaffney (2) 2' c, 10' m Campbell 4' c Sinclair 9' m Mattinson 12' m Con: Thomson (4/9) 3', 5', 6', 7'; Smith (0/1) | Report | Cards: Kanchana (yellow card) 2' |

Coventry Stadium, Coventry
Referee: Holly Wood (England)

Fifth place match

31 July 2022
18:22

| England | 29–5 | Scotland |
| Try: Quansah 2' c Boatman 8' m Crompton (2) 10' m, 14' m Jones 12' c Con: Norman-Bell (1/2) 2'; Jones (1/3) 13' | Report | Con: Rollie 8' m Cards: Thomson (0/1) |

Coventry Stadium, Coventry
Referee: Ashleigh Murray-Pretorius (South Africa)

== Squash ==
A squad of six players was officially selected on 8 June 2022.

Singles

| Athlete | Event | Round of 64 | Round of 32 | Round of 16 | Quarterfinals | Semifinals | Final | |
| Athlete | Event | Opposition Score | Opposition Score | Opposition Score | Opposition Score | Opposition Score | Opposition Score | Rank |
|---|---|---|---|---|---|---|---|---|
| Alan Clyne | Men's singles | Bye | Singh (IND); W 2 - 0 Ret | Makin (WAL); L 0 - 3 | did not advance | | | |
| Greg Lobban | Men's singles | Bye | Laksiri (SRI); W 3 - 0 | Yuen (MAS); W 3 - 2 | Ghosal (IND); L 1 - 3 | did not advance | | |
| Rory Stewart | Men's singles | Nimji (KEN); W 3 - 0 | Chileche (NZL); W 3 - 1 | Rooney (ENG); W 3 - 2 | Willstrop (ENG); L 2 - 3 | did not advance | | |
| Georgia Adderley | Women's singles | Bye | Keane (BER); W 3 - 0 | King (NZL); L 0 - 3 | did not advance | | | |

Doubles

| Athlete | Event | Round of 32 | Round of 16 | Quarterfinals | Semifinals | Third place | |
| Athlete | Event | Opposition Score | Opposition Score | Opposition Score | Opposition Score | Opposition Score | Rank |
|---|---|---|---|---|---|---|---|
| Douglas Kempsell; Alan Clyne | Men's doubles | Bye | Senthilkumar / Singh (IND); L 1 - 2 | did not advance | | | |
| Greg Lobban; Rory Stewart | Men's doubles | Bye | Aslam / Iqbal (PAK); W 2 - 1 | Alexander / Cuskelly (AUS); W 2 - 0 | Selby / Waller (ENG); L 1 - 2 | Ng / Yuen (MAS); W 2 - 0 | 3rd place, bronze medalist(s) |
| Lisa Aitken; Georgia Adderley | Women's doubles | Bye | Palmer / Watts (NZL); W 2 - 0 | Perry / Waters (ENG); L 0 - 2 | did not advance | | |
| Georgia Adderley; Rory Stewart | Mixed doubles | Haywood / Simpson (BAR); W 2 - 0 | Naughton / Sachvie (CAN); W 2 - 0 | Coll / King (NZL); L 0 - 2 | did not advance | | |
| Greg Lobban; Lisa Aitken | Mixed doubles | Bye | West / Stafford (CAY); W 2 - 0 | Lobban / Pilley (AUS); L 1 - 2 | did not advance | | |

== Swimming ==
Two swimmers were officially selected on 16 December 2021. Twenty-four swimmers (including Tokyo 2020 relay champion Duncan Scott) were confirmed on 16 June 2022, though Kathleen Dawson had to withdraw from the squad back to a back injury. Another two swimmers were added to the squad on 11 July 2022.

Those picked for the parasport events had qualified via the World Para Swimming Para Rankings for performances between 31 December 2020 and 18 April 2022.

Men

| Athlete | Event | Heat | | Semifinal | | Final | |
| Athlete | Event | Time | Rank | Time | Rank | Time | Rank |
|---|---|---|---|---|---|---|---|
| Stephen Clegg | 50 m freestyle S13 | —N/a | | | | 24.33 | 2nd place, silver medalist(s) |
| Duncan Scott | 100 m freestyle | 49.31 | 9 Q | 48.78 | 6 Q | 48.27 | 3rd place, bronze medalist(s) |
| Evan Jones | 200 m freestyle | 1:49.00 | 14 | —N/a | | did not advance | |
| Stephen Milne | 200 m freestyle | 1:49.56 | 16 | —N/a | | did not advance | |
| Duncan Scott | 200 m freestyle | 1:47.16 | 2 Q | —N/a | | 1:45.02 | 1st place, gold medalist(s) |
| Stephen Milne | 400 m freestyle | 3:54.35 | 13 | —N/a | | did not advance | |
| Scott Gibson | 50 m backstroke | 25.26 | 4 Q | 25.29 | 5 Q | 25.34 | 6 |
| Craig McNally | 50 m backstroke | 26.03 | 18 | did not advance | | | |
| Martyn Walton | 50 m backstroke | 25.62 | 11 Q | 25.58 | 12 | did not advance | |
| Scott Gibson | 100 m backstroke | 56.54 | 17 | did not advance | | | |
| Craig McNally | 100 m backstroke | 55.09 | 11 Q | 54.86 | 10 | did not advance | |
| Martyn Walton | 100 m backstroke | 55.01 | 10 Q | 55.50 | 12 | did not advance | |
| Samuel Downie | 100 m backstroke S9 | —N/a | | | | 1:11.536 | 6 |
| Craig McNally | 200 m backstroke | 1:58.36 | 5 Q | —N/a | | 1:58.65 | 7 |
| Craig Benson | 50 m breaststroke | 27.72 | 7 Q | 27.64 | 4 Q | 27.43 | 5 |
| Archie Goodburn | 50 m breaststroke | 27.68 | 6 Q | 27.72 | 9 | did not advance | |
| Ross Murdoch | 50 m breaststroke | 27.58 | 4 Q | 27.69 | 8 Q | 27.32 | 3rd place, bronze medalist(s) |
| Craig Benson | 100 m breaststroke | 1:01.14 | 9 Q | 1:00.61 | 7 Q | 1:00.53 | 6 |
| Archie Goodburn | 100 m breaststroke | 1:00.92 | 5 Q | 1:00.75 | 9 | did not advance | |
| Ross Murdoch | 100 m breaststroke | 1:01.10 | 7 Q | 1:00.36 | 6 Q | 1:00.04 | 5 |
| Ross Murdoch | 200 m breaststroke | 2:11.35 | 2 Q | —N/a | | 2:10.41 | 3rd place, bronze medalist(s) |
| Gregor Swinney | 50 m butterfly | 23.91 | 12 Q | 24.21 | 16 | did not advance | |
| Tom Beeley | 100 m butterfly | 54.15 | 17 Q | 54.15 | 15 | did not advance | |
| Evan Jones | 100 m butterfly | 54.06 | 16 Q | DNS | | did not advance | |
| Gregor Swinney | 100 m butterfly | 54.05 | 15 Q | 53.95 | 14 | did not advance | |
| Oliver Carter | 100 m butterfly S10 | —N/a | | | | 1:04.67 | 7 |
| Tom Beeley | 200 m butterfly | 1:59.40 | 11 | —N/a | | did not advance | |
| Duncan Scott | 200 m butterfly | 1:57.48 | 3 Q | —N/a | | 1:56.89 | 5 |
| Evan Jones | 200 m individual medley | 2:01.79 | 10 | —N/a | | did not advance | |
| Duncan Scott | 200 m individual medley | 2:00.41 | 3 Q | —N/a | | 1:56.88 | 1st place, gold medalist(s) |
| Mark Szaranek | 200 m individual medley | 2:00.81 | 5 Q | —N/a | | 2:00.73 | 8 |
| Duncan Scott | 400 m individual medley | 4:20.92 | 7 Q | —N/a | | 4:11.27 | 3rd place, bronze medalist(s) |
| Mark Szaranek | 400 m individual medley | 4:21.34 | 8 Q | —N/a | | 4:19.62 | 8 |
| | 4 × 100 m freestyle relay | DNS | | —N/a | | did not advance | |
| Stephen Milne; Evan Jones; Mark Szaranek; Duncan Scott | 4 × 200 m freestyle relay | —N/a | | | | 7:09.33 | 3rd place, bronze medalist(s) |
| Craig McNally; Ross Murdoch; Duncan Scott; Evan Jones; Martyn Walton; Craig Benson; Gregor Swinney; Stephen Milne | 4 × 100 m medley relay | 3:40.41 | 3 Q | —N/a | | 3:35.11 | 3rd place, bronze medalist(s) |

Women

| Athlete | Event | Heat | | Semifinal | | Final | |
| Athlete | Event | Time | Rank | Time | Rank | Time | Rank |
|---|---|---|---|---|---|---|---|
| Evie Davis | 50 m freestyle | 26.01 | 16 Q | 25.96 | 15 | did not advance | |
| Emma Russell | 50 m freestyle | 25.87 | 14 Q | 25.65 | 12 | did not advance | |
| Abby Kane | 50 m freestyle S13 | —N/a | | | | 30.26 | 6 |
| Evie Davis | 100 m freestyle | 56.89 | 17 Q | 56.35 | 14 | did not advance | |
| Lucy Hope | 100 m freestyle | 55.87 | 11 Q | 55.63 | 10 | did not advance | |
| Emma Russell | 100 m freestyle | 56.12 | 14 Q | 56.43 | 15 | did not advance | |
| Toni Shaw | 100 m freestyle S9 | 1:04.28 | 2 Q | —N/a | | 1:03.75 | 3rd place, bronze medalist(s) |
| Lucy Hope | 200 m freestyle | 2:00.01 | 8 Q | —N/a | | 1:59.74 | 6 |
| Cassie Wild | 50 m backstroke | 29.19 | 10 Q | Withdrew | | did not advance | |
| Holly McGill | 100 m backstroke | 1:02.41 | 11 Q | 1:02.54 | 11 | did not advance | |
| Katie Shanahan | 100 m backstroke | 1:02.86 | 12 Q | 1:01.66 | 7 Q | 1:02.09 | 8 |
| Cassie Wild | 100 m backstroke | 1:02.06 | 9 Q | 1:01.81 | 10 | did not advance | |
| Holly McGill | 200 m backstroke | 2:13.03 | 5 Q | —N/a | | 2:13.00 | 5 |
| Katie Shanahan | 200 m backstroke | 2:11.48 | 4 Q | —N/a | | 2:09.22 | 3rd place, bronze medalist(s) |
| Cassie Wild | 200 m backstroke | 2:17.94 | 8 Q | —N/a | | 2:18.32 | 7 |
| Kara Hanlon | 50 m breaststroke | 30.99 | 6 Q | 31.20 | 6 Q | 31.39 | 8 |
| Kara Hanlon | 100 m breaststroke | 1:07.99 | 7 Q | 1:08.08 | 8 Q | 1:08.67 | 8 |
| Tain Bruce | 50 m butterfly | 27.56 | 18 | did not advance | | | |
| Keanna Macinnes | 50 m butterfly | 27.18 | 13 Q | 26.98 | 12 | did not advance | |
| Tain Bruce | 100 m butterfly | 59.77 | 14 Q | 59.99 | 14 | did not advance | |
| Keanna Macinnes | 100 m butterfly | 59.56 | 13 Q | 59.57 | 13 | did not advance | |
| Keanna Macinnes | 200 m butterfly | 2:11.15 | 7 Q | —N/a | | 2:10.79 | 7 |
| Katie Shanahan | 200 m individual medley | 2:15.12 | 9 | —N/a | | did not advance | |
| Toni Shaw | 200 m individual medley SM10 | —N/a | | | | 2:39.39 | 4 |
| Katie Shanahan | 400 m individual medley | 4:46.19 | 7 Q | —N/a | | 4:39.37 | 3rd place, bronze medalist(s) |
| Lucy Hope; Emma Russell; Tain Bruce; Evie Davis | 4 × 100 m freestyle relay | —N/a | | | | 3:41.38 | 5 |
| Lucy Hope; Emma Russell; Tain Bruce; Evie Davis | 4 × 200 m freestyle relay | —N/a | | | | 8:13.84 | 5 |
| Katie Shanahan; Kara Hanlon; Keanna Macinnes; Lucy Hope | 4 × 100 m medley relay | —N/a | | | | 4:04.83 | 5 |

Mixed

| Athlete | Event | Heat | | Final | |
| Athlete | Event | Time | Rank | Time | Rank |
|---|---|---|---|---|---|
| Stephen Milne; Evan Jones; Emma Russell; Evie Davis | 4 × 100 m freestyle relay | 3:31.09 | 5 Q | 3:30.71 | 5 |
| Craig McNally; Ross Murdoch; Keanna Macinnes; Lucy Hope; Martyn Walton; Archie Goodburn; Tain Bruce | 4 × 100 m medley relay | 3:52.32 | 5 Q | 3:48.55 | 6 |

== Table tennis ==
Four players were officially selected on 29 April 2022.

Singles

| Athletes | Event | Group stage | | | | Round of 32 | Round of 16 | Quarterfinal | Semifinal | Final / BM | |
| Athletes | Event | Opposition Score | Opposition Score | Opposition Score | Rank | Opposition Score | Opposition Score | Opposition Score | Opposition Score | Opposition Score | Rank |
|---|---|---|---|---|---|---|---|---|---|---|---|
| Colin Dalgleish | Men's singles | Commey (GHA); W 4 - 0 | Wu (FIJ); W 4 - 0 | Nuopula (SOL); W 4 - 0 | 1 Q | Abiodun (NGR); L 2 - 4 | did not advance | | | | |
| Gavin Rumgay | Men's singles | Baboolall (MRI); W 4 - 0 | Wykes (JEY); W 4 - 0 | —N/a | 1 Q | Chan (MRI); W 4 - 0 | Aruna (NGR); L 0 - 4 | did not advance | | | |
| Lucy Elliott | Women's singles | Ho (MAS); L 0 - 4 | Yee (FIJ); W 4 - 1 | Mawa (VAN); W 4 - 0 | 2 | did not advance | | | | | |
| Rebecca Plaistow | Women's singles | Kwabi (GHA); W 4 - 0 | Lyne (MAS); L 1 - 4 | —N/a | 2 | did not advance | | | | | |

Doubles

| Athletes | Event | Round of 64 | Round of 32 | Round of 16 | Quarterfinal | Semifinal | Final / BM | |
| Athletes | Event | Opposition Score | Opposition Score | Opposition Score | Opposition Score | Opposition Score | Opposition Score | Rank |
|---|---|---|---|---|---|---|---|---|
| Colin Dalgleish; Gavin Rumgay | Men's doubles | Bye | Pitchford / Drinkhall (ENG); L 1 - 3 | did not advance | | | | |
| Lucy Elliott; Rebecca Plaistow | Women's doubles | Bye | Akula / Tennison (IND); L 0 - 3 | did not advance | | | | |
| Colin Dalgleish; Rebecca Plaistow | Mixed doubles | Douglas / Chung (TTO); W 3 - 2 | Luu / Liu (AUS); L 0 - 3 | did not advance | | | | |

== Triathlon ==
One triathlete was officially selected on 14 December 2021, followed by the selection of one paratriathlete on 9 May 2022 (their guide was later confirmed on 1 July 2022).

Three more triathletes were added to complete the five-strong squad on 8 June 2022.

Individual

| Athlete | Event | Swim (750 m) | Trans 1 | Bike (20 km) | Trans 2 | Run (5 km) | Total | Rank |
|---|---|---|---|---|---|---|---|---|
| Cameron Main | Men's | 8:40 | 0:54 | 26:14 | 0:19 | 16:12 | 52:19 | 14 |
| Grant Sheldon | Men's | 8:41 | 0:52 | 26:16 | 0:20 | 15:15 | 51:24 | 5 |
| Beth Potter | Women's | 9:20 | 0:52 | 29:22 | 0:19 | 16:53 | 56:46 | 3rd place, bronze medalist(s) |
| Sophia Green | Women's | 9:39 | 0:59 | 29:20 | 0:22 | 18:13 | 58:33 | 17 |

Paratriathlon

| Athlete | Event | Comp | Swim (750 m) | Trans 1 | Bike (20 km) | Trans 2 | Run (5 km) | Total | Rank |
|---|---|---|---|---|---|---|---|---|---|
| Alison Peasgood; Guide: Hazel MacLeod | Women's PTVI | 3:19 | 11:27 | 1:24 | did not finish | | | | |

Mixed Relay

| Athletes | Event | Total Times per Athlete (Swim 250 m, Bike 7 km, Run 1.5 km) | Total Group Time | Rank |
|---|---|---|---|---|
| Cameron Main; Sophia Green; Grant Sheldon; Beth Potter | Mixed relay | 18:13; 19:59; 19:19; 21:04 | 1:18:35 | 5 |

== Weightlifting ==
Courtesy of their positions on the IWF Commonwealth Ranking List (which was finalised on 9 March 2022), a squad of five weightlifters (two men, three women) was officially selected on 21 April 2022.

Men

| Athlete | Event | Weight Lifted | | Total | Rank |
| Athlete | Event | Snatch | Clean & jerk | Total | Rank |
|---|---|---|---|---|---|
| Jason Epton | 81 kg | 120 | 157 | 277 | 10 |

Women

| Athlete | Event | Weight Lifted | | Total | Rank |
| Athlete | Event | Snatch | Clean & Jerk | Total | Rank |
|---|---|---|---|---|---|
| Jodey Hughes | 55 kg | NM | DNS | DNF | |
| Alice Aitchison | 71 kg | NM | DNS | DNF | |
| Agata Herbert | 76 kg | 86 | 113 | 199 | 7 |

== Wrestling ==
A squad of five wrestlers was officially selected on 22 June 2022, followed by the addition of a sixth on 1 July 2022.

Key:

- VT - Victory by Fall.
- PP - Decision by Points - the loser with technical points.
- PO - Decision by Points - the loser without technical points.

Repechage Format

| Athlete | Event | Round of 16 | Quarterfinal | Semifinal | Repechage | Final / BM | |
| Athlete | Event | Opposition Result | Opposition Result | Opposition Result | Opposition Result | Opposition Result | Rank |
|---|---|---|---|---|---|---|---|
| Ross Connelly | Men's -65 kg | Richards (NZL); W 10 - 0 | McNeil (CAN); L 0 - 10 | Did not advance | Bye | Ullah (PAK); L 0 - 10 | 5 |
| Nicolae Cojocaru | Men's -74 kg | Phulka (CAN); L 5 - 7 | did not advance | | | | |
| Kieran Malone | Men's -86 kg | Inam (PAK); L 0 - 11 | did not advance | | Lawrence (AUS); L 0 - 10 | Did not advance | 7 |
| Cameron Nicol | Men's -97 kg | Bye | Raza (PAK); L 0 - 10 | did not advance | | | |
| Abbie Fountain | Women's -62 kg | —N/a | Godinez (CAN); L 0 - 10 | Did not advance | —N/a | Kolawole (NGR); L 0 - 10 | 5 |

Group Stage Format

| Athlete | Event | Group Stage | | | Semifinal | Final / BM | |
| Athlete | Event | Opposition Result | Opposition Result | Rank | Opposition Result | Opposition Result | Rank |
|---|---|---|---|---|---|---|---|
| Christelle Letchidjio | Women's -50 kg | Gehlot (IND); L 2 - 12 | Muambo (CMR); W VFO | 2 Q | Genesis (NGR); L 0 - 10 | Gehlot (IND); L 2 - 12 | 4 |

== Feats and milestones ==
Team Scotland produced a record medal haul outwith a home games of 51 medals and its second largest total ever behind Glasgow 2014. Eilish McColgan (10,000 m silver) won the 500th Commonwealth Games medal for Scotland since it began in 1930.

Scottish Cycling secured a record medal haul with 11 in total. Neah Evans became the first Scottish cyclist to win three medals at the same Games.

Scottish Athletics achieved its best medal total with eight since 10 medals in 1982. Laura Muir was the first Scottish woman to win the 1500 metres at the Games. The women's 4 x 100 metres relay had also qualified for the Games for first time in 36 years.

Scotland won three good medals in boxing for the first time. With five medals in total, it was the best total since 1986.
