= Swimming at the 2022 Commonwealth Games – Men's 200 metre individual medley =

Men's 200 metre individual medley at the 2022 Commonwealth Games
- Venue: Sandwell Aquatics Centre
- Dates: August 3
- Competitors: 22 from 14 nations
- Winning time: 1:56.88

Medalists
| gold medal | Duncan Scott | Scotland |
| silver medal | Tom Dean | England |
| bronze medal | Lewis Clareburt | New Zealand |

The men's 200 metre individual medley event at the 2022 Commonwealth Games was held on 3 August at the Sandwell Aquatics Centre.

== Schedule ==
The schedule is as follows:

All times are British Summer Time (UTC+1)

| Date | Time | Round |
|---|---|---|
| Wednesday 3 August 2022 | 10:30 | Heats |
| Wednesday 3 August 2022 | 19:07 | Final |

== Records ==
Prior to this competition, the existing world, Commonwealth and Games records were as follows:

| World record | Ryan Lochte (USA) | 1:54.00 | Shanghai, China | 28 July 2011 |
| Commonwealth record | Duncan Scott (GBR) | 1:55.28 | Tokyo, Japan | 30 July 2021 |
| Games record | Mitch Larkin (AUS) | 1:57.67 | Gold Coast, Australia | 10 April 2018 |

The following records were established during the competition:

| Date | Event | Name | Nationality | Time | Record |
|---|---|---|---|---|---|
| 3 August | Final | Duncan Scott | Scotland | 1:56.88 | GR |

== Results ==
=== Heats ===
| Rank | Heat | Lane | Name | Nation | Result | Notes |
|---|---|---|---|---|---|---|
| 1 | 2 | 4 | Tom Dean | England | 1:59.36 | Q |
| 2 | 2 | 5 | Finlay Knox | Canada | 1:59.67 | Q |
| 3 | 4 | 4 | Duncan Scott | Scotland | 2:00.41 | Q |
| 4 | 2 | 3 | Se-Bom Lee | Australia | 2:00.62 | Q |
| 5 | 2 | 6 | Mark Szaranek | Scotland | 2:00.81 | Q |
| 6 | 4 | 5 | Lewis Clareburt | New Zealand | 2:01.12 | Q |
| 7 | 4 | 3 | Brendon Smith | Australia | 2:01.17 | Q |
| 8 | 2 | 3 | James McFadzen | England | 2:01.44 | Q |
| 9 | 3 | 4 | Mitch Larkin | Australia | 2:01.59 | R |
| 10 | 3 | 2 | Evan Jones | Scotland | 2:01.79 | R |
| 11 | 4 | 6 | Collyn Gagne | Canada | 2:01.82 | |
| 12 | 3 | 5 | Matthew Sates | South Africa | 2:01.99 | |
| 13 | 4 | 7 | Andrew Ross | South Africa | 2:03.47 | |
| 14 | 4 | 1 | Arvin Chahal | Malaysia | 2:05.65 | |
| 15 | 2 | 2 | Robbie Jones | Jersey | 2:08.02 | |
| 16 | 2 | 7 | Isaac Dodds | Jersey | 2:09.11 | |
| 17 | 3 | 7 | Brandon Schuster | Samoa | 2:09.85 | |
| 18 | 3 | 1 | Simon Bachmann | Seychelles | 2:11.96 | |
| 19 | 1 | 5 | Samuel Lowe | Guernsey | 2:13.06 | |
| 20 | 1 | 4 | Zackary Gresham | Grenada | 2:13.13 | NR |
| 21 | 3 | 8 | Caio Lobo | Mozambique | 2:13.46 | |
| 22 | 1 | 3 | Mubal Azzam Ibrahim | Maldives | 2:23.69 | |
| | 2 | 1 | Jack McMillan | Northern Ireland | DNS | |
| | 3 | 6 | Javier Acevedo | Canada | DNS | |
| | 4 | 2 | Keanan Dols | Jamaica | DNS | |
| | 4 | 8 | Guy Brooks | South Africa | DNS | |

=== Final ===
| Rank | Lane | Name | Nation | Result | Notes |
|---|---|---|---|---|---|
| 1st place, gold medalist(s) | 3 | Duncan Scott | Scotland | 1:56.88 | GR |
| 2nd place, silver medalist(s) | 4 | Tom Dean | England | 1:57.01 | |
| 3rd place, bronze medalist(s) | 7 | Lewis Clareburt | New Zealand | 1:57.59 | |
| 4 | 5 | Finlay Knox | Canada | 1:58.95 | |
| 5 | 1 | Brendon Smith | Australia | 1:59.57 | |
| 6 | 6 | Se-Bom Lee | Australia | 1:59.86 | |
| 7 | 8 | James McFadzen | England | 1:59.87 | |
| 8 | 2 | Mark Szaranek | Scotland | 2:00.73 | |
