= Swimming at the 2022 Commonwealth Games – Men's 400 metre individual medley =

Men's 400 metre individual medley at the 2022 Commonwealth Games
- Venue: Sandwell Aquatics Centre
- Dates: July 30
- Competitors: 10 from 7 nations
- Winning time: 4:08.70

Medalists
gold medal	Lewis Clareburt	New Zealand
silver medal	Brendon Smith	Australia
bronze medal	Duncan Scott	Scotland

The men's 400 metre individual medley event at the 2022 Commonwealth Games was held on 30 July at the Sandwell Aquatics Centre. New Zealand's Lewis Clareburt won the event, from Australia's Brendon Smith and Scotland's Duncan Scott, setting a new Commonwealth record, Oceanian record, and New Zealand record. He also became the first New Zealand swimmer in 16 years since Moss Burmester did in 2006 to claim a Commonwealth gold medal.

== Schedule ==
The schedule is as follows:

All times are British Summer Time (UTC+1)

Date	Time	Round
Sunday 30 July 2022	10:30	Heats
Sunday 30 July 2022	20:49	Final

== Records ==
Prior to this competition, the existing world, Commonwealth and Games records were as follows:

World record	Michael Phelps (USA)	4:03.84	Beijing, China	10 August 2008
Commonwealth record	Duncan Scott (GBR)	4:09.18	Sheffield, United Kingdom	7 April 2022
Games record	Dan Wallace (SCO)	4:11.04	Glasgow, United Kingdom	25 July 2014

The following records were established during the competition:

Date	Event	Name	Nationality	Time	Record
30 July	Final	Lewis Clareburt	New Zealand	4:08.70	CR

== Results ==
=== Heats ===
Rank	Heat	Lane	Name	Nation	Result	Notes
1	2	5	Lewis Clareburt	New Zealand	4:17.72	Q
2	1	4	Brendon Smith	Australia	4:18.32	Q
3	1	5	Matthew Sates	South Africa	4:19.04	Q
4	1	6	Collyn Gagne	Canada	4:19.63	Q
5	2	6	Kieren Pollard	Australia	4:19.64	Q
6	1	3	Se-Bom Lee	Australia	4:19.66	Q
7	2	4	Duncan Scott	Scotland	4:20.92	Q
8	2	2	Mark Szaranek	Scotland	4:21.34	Q
9	1	2	Isaac Dodds	Jersey	4:29.70	R
10	2	7	Mohamed Rihan Shiham	Maldives	5:35.70	R
	2	3	Brodie Williams	England	DNS	

=== Final ===
Rank	Lane	Name	Nation	Result	Notes
1st place, gold medalist(s)	4	Lewis Clareburt	New Zealand	4:08.70	CR, OC
2nd place, silver medalist(s)	5	Brendon Smith	Australia	4:10.15	
3rd place, bronze medalist(s)	1	Duncan Scott	Scotland	4:11.27	
4	3	Matthew Sates	South Africa	4:16.61	
5	7	Se-Bom Lee	Australia	4:16.68	
6	2	Kieren Pollard	Australia	4:17.02	
7	6	Collyn Gagne	Canada	4:19.32	
8	8	Mark Szaranek	Scotland	4:19.62	
