= Swimming at the 2022 Commonwealth Games – Men's 4 × 200 metre freestyle relay =

Men's 4 × 200 metre freestyle relay at the 2022 Commonwealth Games
- Venue: Sandwell Aquatics Centre
- Dates: 1 August
- Competitors: 32 from 8 nations
- Winning time: 7:04.96

Medalists
gold medal	Elijah Winnington; Flynn Southam; Zac Incerti; Mack Horton	Australia
silver medal	James Guy; Jacob Whittle; Joe Litchfield; Tom Dean	England
bronze medal	Stephen Milne; Evan Jones; Mark Szaranek; Duncan Scott	Scotland

The men's 4 × 200 metre freestyle relay event at the 2022 Commonwealth Games was held on 1 August at the Sandwell Aquatics Centre.

== Records ==
Prior to this competition, the existing world, Commonwealth and Games records were as follows:

World record	United States (USA); Michael Phelps; Ricky Berens; David Walters; Ryan Lochte	6:58.55	Rome, Italy	31 July 2009
Commonwealth record	Great Britain (GBR); Thomas Dean; James Guy; Matthew Richards; Duncan Scott	6:58.58	Tokyo, Japan	28 July 2021
Games record	Australia; Alexander Graham; Kyle Chalmers; Elijah Winnington; Mack Horton	7:05.97	Gold Coast, Australia	8 April 2018

The following records were established during the competition:

Date	Event	Name	Nationality	Time	Record
1 August	Final	Elijah Winnington; Flynn Southam; Zac Incerti; Mack Horton	Australia	7:04.96	GR

== Schedule ==
The schedule is as follows:

All times are British Summer Time (UTC+1)

Date	Time	Round
Monday 1 August 2022	21:16	Final

== Results ==
=== Final ===
Rank	Lane	Nation	Swimmers	Time	Notes
1st place, gold medalist(s)	4	Australia	Elijah Winnington (1:46.36); Flynn Southam (1:46.08); Zac Incerti (1:46.08); Mack Horton (1:46.44)	7:04.96	GR
2nd place, silver medalist(s)	5	England	James Guy (1:46.87); Jacob Whittle (1:47.89); Joe Litchfield (1:47.59); Tom Dean (1:45.15)	7:07.50	
3rd place, bronze medalist(s)	2	Scotland	Stephen Milne (1:49.30); Evan Jones (1:47.64); Mark Szaranek (1:47.91); Duncan Scott (1:44.48)	7:09.33	
4	3	Wales	Calum Jarvis (1:47.38); Matt Richards (1:46.47); Dan Jones (1:48.79); Kieran Bird (1:48.00)	7:10.64	
5	8	Canada	Ruslan Gaziev (1:48.73); Finlay Knox (1:48.03); Jeremy Bagshaw (1:49.22); Javier Acevedo (1:46.70)	7:12.68	
6	6	South Africa	Matthew Sates (1:47.07); Chad le Clos (1:47.47); Andrew Ross (1:49.36); Pieter Coetze (1:49.86)	7:13.76	
7	7	Isle of Man	Alex Bregazzi (1:52.20); Joel Watterson (1:55.65); Peter Allen (1:57.48); Harry Robinson (1:58.37)	7:43.70	
8	1	Gibraltar	Matt Savitz (2:01.67); Jordan Gonzalez (2:04.87); Aidan Carroll (2:01.58); Johnpaul Balloqui (2:00.71)	8:08.83	
