= Swimming at the 2022 Commonwealth Games – Women's 100 metre freestyle =

Women's 100 metre freestyle at the 2022 Commonwealth Games
- Venue: Sandwell Aquatics Centre
- Dates: 1 August (heats, semifinals); 2 August (final)
- Competitors: 55 from 33 nations
- Winning time: 52.63

Medalists
gold medal	Mollie O'Callaghan	Australia
silver medal	Shayna Jack	Australia
bronze medal	Emma McKeon	Australia

The women's 100 metre freestyle event at the 2022 Commonwealth Games will be held on 1 and 2 August at the Sandwell Aquatics Centre.

== Records ==
Prior to this competition, the existing world, Commonwealth and Games records were as follows:

Record	Time	Athlete (nation)	Meet	Location	Date	Ref
World record	51.71	Sarah Sjöström (SWE)		Budapest, Hungary	23 July 2017	
Commonwealth record	51.96	Emma McKeon (AUS)		Tokyo, Japan	30 July 2021	
Games record	52.27	Bronte Campbell (AUS)		Gold Coast, Australia	9 April 2018	

== Schedule ==
The schedule is as follows:

All times are British Summer Time (UTC+1)

Date	Time	Round
Monday 1 August 2022	10:51	Qualifying
Monday 1 August 2022	19:31	Semifinals
Tuesday 2 August 2022	19:43	Final

== Results ==
=== Heats ===
Rank	Heat	Lane	Name	Nationality	Time	Notes
1	7	4	Mollie O'Callaghan	Australia	54.28	Q
2	7	5	Freya Anderson	England	54.83	Q
3	6	4	Shayna Jack	Australia	55.20	Q
4	8	6	Aimee Canny	South Africa	55.27	Q
5	8	3	Rebecca Smith	Canada	55.32	Q
6	8	4	Emma McKeon	Australia	55.36	Q
7	8	5	Anna Hopkin	England	55.50	Q
8	7	3	Katerine Savard	Canada	55.61	Q
9	7	7	Emma Chelius	South Africa	55.63	Q
10	8	2	Isabella Hindley	England	55.83	Q
11	6	5	Lucy Hope	Scotland	55.87	Q
12	6	2	Victoria Catterson	Northern Ireland	55.97	Q
13	7	6	Erin Gallagher	South Africa	56.10	WD
14	8	7	Emma Russell	Scotland	56.12	Q
15	6	7	Rebecca Sutton	Wales	56.37	Q
16	8	8	Anna Hadjiloizou	Cyprus	56.48	Q
17	7	2	Evie Davis	Scotland	56.89	R, Q
18	6	3	Quah Ting Wen	Singapore	56.97	R
19	7	1	Maddy Moore	Bermuda	56.98	
20	6	1	Amanda Lim	Singapore	57.08	
21	6	8	Mackenzie Headley	Jamaica	57.37	
22	5	2	Olivia Borg	Samoa	57.53	NR
23	5	6	Lily Scott	Jersey	57.84	
24	5	5	Emily Muteti	Kenya	58.03	
25	5	4	Kaitlyn McCaw	Northern Ireland	58.26	
26	7	8	Maxine Egner	Botswana	58.46	
27	5	8	Orla Rabey	Guernsey	58.67	
28	5	1	Zaneta Alvaranga	Jamaica	58.80	
29	4	7	Norah Milanesi	Cameroon	59.06	
30	5	7	Kyra Rabess	Cayman Islands	59.29	
31	5	3	Gemma Atherley	Jersey	59.74	
32	4	3	Tatiana Tostevin	Guernsey	1:00.05	
33	4	6	Olivia Fuller	Antigua and Barbuda	1:00.56	
34	4	4	Zaylie-Elizabeth Thompson	Bahamas	1:00.60	
35	3	8	Molly Staples	Guernsey	1:00.65	
36	4	2	Rosemarie Rova	Fiji	1:00.78	
37	3	4	Alicia Kok Shun	Mauritius	1:00.80	
38	3	7	Sierrah Broadbelt	Cayman Islands	1:00.82	
39	3	5	Aleka Persaud	Guyana	1:01.03	NR
40	2	5	Jehanara Nabi	Pakistan	1:01.51	NR
41	4	5	Kirabo Namutebi	Uganda	1:01.58	
42	3	1	Georgia-Leigh Vele	Papua New Guinea	1:01.60	
43	3	2	Rhanishka Gibbs	Bahamas	1:01.74	
44	4	8	Cheyenne Rova	Fiji	1:01.81	
45	4	1	Therese Soukup	Seychelles	1:02.09	
46	3	3	Aaliyah Palestrini	Seychelles	1:02.51	
47	2	4	Bisma Khan	Pakistan	1:02.59	
48	3	6	Tilly Collymore	Grenada	1:02.68	
49	2	6	Avice Meya	Uganda	1:03.01	
50	2	3	Jamie Joachim	Saint Vincent and the Grenadines	1:03.66	
51	1	5	Unilez Takyi	Ghana	1:03.79	
52	2	2	Alicia Mateus	Mozambique	1:03.89	
53	2	7	Patrice Mahaica	Guyana	1:04.60	
54	1	4	Charissa Panuve	Tonga	1:05.87	
55	1	3	Vivienne Ponsford	Saint Helena	1:09.31	
	6	6	Danielle Hill	Northern Ireland	DNS	
	8	1	Quah Jing Wen	Singapore	DNS	

=== Semifinals ===
Rank	Heat	Lane	Name	Nationality	Time	Notes
1	1	3	Emma McKeon	Australia	53.12	Q
2	2	4	Mollie O'Callaghan	Australia	53.33	Q
3	2	5	Shayna Jack	Australia	53.43	Q
4	2	6	Anna Hopkin	England	53.96	Q
5	1	4	Freya Anderson	England	54.15	Q
6	1	5	Aimee Canny	South Africa	54.78	Q
7	2	3	Rebecca Smith	Canada	55.03	Q
8	1	6	Katerine Savard	Canada	55.41	Q
9	1	2	Isabella Hindley	England	55.60	R
10	2	7	Lucy Hope	Scotland	55.63	R
11	2	2	Emma Chelius	South Africa	55.80	
12	1	1	Rebecca Sutton	Wales	56.02	
13	1	7	Victoria Catterson	Northern Ireland	56.04	
14	1	8	Evie Davis	Scotland	56.35	
15	2	1	Emma Russell	Scotland	56.43	
16	2	8	Anna Hadjiloizou	Cyprus	56.92	

=== Final ===
Rank	Lane	Name	Nationality	Time	Notes
1st place, gold medalist(s)	5	Mollie O'Callaghan	Australia	52.63	
2nd place, silver medalist(s)	3	Shayna Jack	Australia	52.88	
3rd place, bronze medalist(s)	4	Emma McKeon	Australia	52.94	
4	6	Anna Hopkin	England	53.57	
5	2	Freya Anderson	England	54.00	
6	7	Aimee Canny	South Africa	54.88	
7	1	Rebecca Smith	Canada	55.09	
8	8	Katerine Savard	Canada	55.22	
