= Swimming at the 2022 Commonwealth Games – Women's 50 metre freestyle =

Women's 50 metre freestyle at the 2022 Commonwealth Games
- Venue: Sandwell Aquatics Centre
- Dates: 30 July (heats, semifinals); 31 July (final)
- Competitors: 69 from 44 nations
- Winning time: 23.99

Medalists
gold medal	Emma McKeon	Australia
silver medal	Meg Harris	Australia
bronze medal	Shayna Jack	Australia

The women's 50 metre freestyle event at the 2022 Commonwealth Games will be held on 30 and 31 July at the Sandwell Aquatics Centre.

== Records ==
Prior to this competition, the existing world, Commonwealth and Games records were as follows:

World record	Sarah Sjöström (SWE)	23.67	Budapest, Hungary	29 July 2017
Commonwealth record	Cate Campbell (AUS)	23.78	Gold Coast, Australia	7 April 2018
Games record	Cate Campbell (AUS)	23.78	Gold Coast, Australia	7 April 2018

== Schedule ==
The schedule is as follows:

All times are British Summer Time (UTC+1)

Date	Time	Round
Saturday 30 July 2022	10:47	Qualifying
Saturday 30 July 2022	19:18	Semifinals
Sunday 31 July 2022	20:05	Final

== Results ==
=== Heats ===
Rank	Heat	Lane	Name	Nationality	Time	Notes
1	8	4	Shayna Jack	Australia	24.31	Q
2	9	4	Emma McKeon	Australia	24.52	Q
3	7	4	Meg Harris	Australia	24.57	Q
4	8	5	Anna Hopkin	England	24.77	Q
5	9	5	Emma Chelius	South Africa	25.11	Q
6	9	6	Danielle Hill	Northern Ireland	25.29	Q
7	8	3	Isabella Hindley	England	25.31	Q
8	8	2	Olivia Nel	South Africa	25.40	Q
9	9	7	Anna Hadjiloizou	Cyprus	25.44	Q
10	8	6	Erin Gallagher	South Africa	25.54	Q
11	7	3	Cherelle Thompson	Trinidad and Tobago	25.64	Q
12	9	3	Amanda Lim	Singapore	25.68	Q
13	7	2	Maddy Moore	Bermuda	25.85	Q
14	9	2	Emma Russell	Scotland	25.87	Q
15	8	1	Mackenzie Headley	Jamaica	25.95	Q
16	7	6	Evie Davis	Scotland	26.01	Q
17	7	5	Quah Ting Wen	Singapore	26.03	R
18	9	8	Zaneta Alvaranga	Jamaica	26.49	R
19	7	7	Emily Muteti	Kenya	26.50	
20	8	7	Kirabo Namutebi	Uganda	26.54	
21	6	6	Mikaili Charlemagne	Saint Lucia	26.75	
22	6	5	Rhanishka Gibbs	Bahamas	26.85	
23	5	5	Lily Scott	Jersey	26.95	
24	8	8	Kelsie Campbell	Jamaica	27.03	
25	7	8	Grace Davison	Northern Ireland	27.08	
26	9	1	Norah Milanesi	Cameroon	27.13	
27	6	2	Mollie McAlorum	Northern Ireland	27.15	
28	7	1	Maxine Egner	Botswana	27.24	
29	5	1	Imara Thorpe	Kenya	27.25	
30	4	6	Alicia Kok Shun	Mauritius	27.29	
30	6	1	Kyra Rabess	Cayman Islands	27.29	
32	5	7	Lanihei Connolly	Cook Islands	27.30	
33	3	5	Orla Rabey	Guernsey	27.47	
34	5	6	Laura le Cras	Guernsey	27.72	
35	4	4	Olivia Fuller	Antigua and Barbuda	27.76	
36	4	1	Georgia-Leigh Vele	Papua New Guinea	27.80	
37	6	4	Aleka Persaud	Guyana	27.81	
38	5	8	Bisma Khan	Pakistan	27.82	
39	4	3	Tilka Paljk	Zambia	27.94	
40	4	7	Molly Staples	Guernsey	28.02	
41	6	7	Cheyenne Rova	Fiji	28.03	
42	1	5	Rosemarie Rova	Fiji	28.08	
42	5	4	Lushavel Stickland	Samoa	28.08	
44	5	2	Unilez Takyi	Ghana	28.12	
45	2	2	Sierrah Broadbelt	Cayman Islands	28.13	
46	5	3	Katelyn Cabral	Bahamas	28.15	
47	3	3	Jade Phiri	Zambia	28.16	
48	4	8	Tilly Collymore	Grenada	28.24	
49	3	4	Tessa Ip Hen Cheung	Mauritius	28.30	
50	4	2	Therese Soukup	Seychelles	28.60	
51	6	8	Gemma Atherley	Jersey	28.76	
52	1	4	Tia Gun-Munro	Saint Vincent and the Grenadines	28.84	
53	2	3	Jamie Joachim	Saint Vincent and the Grenadines	28.88	
54	4	5	Aaliyah Palestrini	Seychelles	28.98	
55	2	4	Asia Kent	Gibraltar	29.17	
56	3	2	Alicia Mateus	Mozambique	29.26	
57	2	6	Abigail Deshong	Saint Vincent and the Grenadines	29.37	
58	2	5	Arleigha Hall	Turks and Caicos Islands	29.45	
59	3	8	Patrice Mahaica	Guyana	29.46	
60	3	7	Hayley Hoy	Eswatini	29.98	
61	3	1	Mst Sonia Khatun	Bangladesh	30.22	
62	2	7	Charissa Panuve	Tonga	30.35	
63	1	6	Aishath Sausan	Maldives	30.81	
64	2	8	Hamna Ahmed	Maldives	30.88	
65	1	2	Vivienne Ponsford	Saint Helena	31.22	
66	2	1	Tity Dumbuya	Sierra Leone	31.27	
67	1	3	Kayla Temba	Tanzania	33.08	
68	1	7	Wendy Charles	Solomon Islands	34.02	
	6	3	Olivia Borg	Samoa	DNS	
	3	6	Jessica Makwenda	Malawi	DSQ	

=== Semifinals ===
Rank	Heat	Lane	Name	Nationality	Time	Notes
1	2	4	Shayna Jack	Australia	24.33	Q
2	2	5	Meg Harris	Australia	24.41	Q
3	1	4	Emma McKeon	Australia	24.51	Q
4	1	5	Anna Hopkin	England	24.66	Q
5	2	3	Emma Chelius	South Africa	24.94	Q
6	1	3	Danielle Hill	Northern Ireland	25.15	Q, NR
7	1	2	Erin Gallagher	South Africa	25.31	Q
8	2	6	Isabella Hindley	England	25.36	Q
9	1	6	Olivia Nel	South Africa	25.38	R
10	2	2	Anna Hadjiloizou	Cyprus	25.56	R
11	1	7	Amanda Lim	Singapore	25.62	
12	1	1	Emma Russell	Scotland	25.65	
13	2	7	Cherelle Thompson	Trinidad and Tobago	25.70	
14	2	1	Maddy Moore	Bermuda	25.72	NR
15	1	8	Evie Davis	Scotland	25.96	
16	2	8	Mackenzie Headley	Jamaica	25.97	

=== Final ===
Rank	Lane	Name	Nationality	Time	Notes
1st place, gold medalist(s)	3	Emma McKeon	Australia	23.99	
2nd place, silver medalist(s)	5	Meg Harris	Australia	24.32	
3rd place, bronze medalist(s)	4	Shayna Jack	Australia	24.36	
4	2	Emma Chelius	South Africa	24.78	
5	6	Anna Hopkin	England	24.83	
6	8	Isabella Hindley	England	25.25	
7	7	Danielle Hill	Northern Ireland	25.36	
8	1	Erin Gallagher	South Africa	25.39	
