= Swimming at the 2022 Commonwealth Games – Men's 200 metre freestyle =

Men's 200 metre freestyle at the 2022 Commonwealth Games
- Venue: Sandwell Aquatics Centre
- Dates: 30 July
- Competitors: 38 from 25 nations
- Winning time: 1:45.02

Medalists
gold medal	Duncan Scott	Scotland
silver medal	Tom Dean	England
bronze medal	Elijah Winnington	Australia

The men's 200 metre freestyle event at the 2022 Commonwealth Games will be held on 30 July at the Sandwell Aquatics Centre.

== Records ==
Prior to this competition, the existing world, Commonwealth and Games records were as follows:

World record	Paul Biedermann (GER)	1:42.00	Rome, Italy	28 July 2009
Commonwealth record	Ian Thorpe (AUS)	1:44.06	Fukuoka, Japan	25 July 2001
Games record	Ian Thorpe (AUS)	1:44.71	Manchester, United Kingdom	31 July 2002

== Schedule ==
The schedule is as follows:

All times are British Summer Time (UTC+1)

Date	Time	Round
Saturday 30 July 2022	10:30	Heats
Saturday 30 July 2022	19:43	Final

== Results ==
=== Heats ===
Rank	Heat	Lane	Name	Nationality	Time	Notes
1	3	4	Elijah Winnington	Australia	1:46.87	Q
2	4	4	Duncan Scott	Scotland	1:47.16	Q
3	5	4	Tom Dean	England	1:47.19	Q
4	5	3	Mack Horton	Australia	1:47.37	Q
5	5	5	Matt Richards	Wales	1:47.59	Q
6	4	3	Calum Jarvis	Wales	1:48.22	Q
7	3	5	Matthew Sates	South Africa	1:48.25	Q
8	4	6	Joe Litchfield	England	1:48.44	Q
9	5	6	Jack McMillan	Northern Ireland	1:48.51	R
10	3	6	Ruslan Gaziev	Canada	1:48.59	R
11	5	2	Khiew Hoe Yean	Malaysia	1:48.85	
12	3	3	Cameron Kurle	England	1:48.94	
13	4	7	Kieran Bird	Wales	1:48.99	
14	4	1	Evan Jones	Scotland	1:49.00	
15	4	5	Zac Incerti	Australia	1:49.54	
16	5	1	Stephen Milne	Scotland	1:49.56	
17	5	7	Jeremy Bagshaw	Canada	1:49.57	
18	3	7	Andrew Ross	South Africa	1:49.75	
19	4	2	Wesley Roberts	Cook Islands	1:49.83	
20	3	2	Cameron Gray	New Zealand	1:50.35	
21	3	1	James Freeman	Botswana	1:50.63	NR
22	4	8	Arvin Chahal	Malaysia	1:51.73	
23	5	8	Alex Bregazzi	Isle of Man	1:52.339	
24	2	4	James Allison	Cayman Islands	1:54.14	
25	3	8	Kushagra Rawat	India	1:54.56	
26	2	2	Luke-Kennedy Thompson	Bahamas	1:55.44	
27	2	6	Christos Manoli	Cyprus	1:56.16	
28	2	3	Peter Allen	Isle of Man	1:57.48	
29	2	1	Collins Saliboko	Tanzania	1:57.76	
30	1	6	Tyler Fred	Seychelles	1:58.46	
31	1	5	Samuel Lowe	Guernsey	1:59.45	
32	2	7	Monyo Maina	Kenya	1:59.72	
33	2	5	Ollie Brehaut	Jersey	2:00.62	
34	1	4	Temafa Yalimaiwai	Fiji	2:00.87	
35	2	8	Matt Savitz	Gibraltar	2:01.46	
36	1	3	Kow Jackson	Ghana	2:10.24	
37	1	2	Stefan Thomas	Saint Helena	2:12.70	
38	1	7	William Caswell	Saint Helena	1:57.48	

=== Final ===
Rank	Lane	Name	Nationality	Time	Notes
1st place, gold medalist(s)	5	Duncan Scott	Scotland	1:45.02	
2nd place, silver medalist(s)	3	Tom Dean	England	1:45.41	
3rd place, bronze medalist(s)	4	Elijah Winnington	Australia	1:45.62	
4	6	Mack Horton	Australia	1:46.78	
5	2	Matt Richards	Wales	1:47.19	
6	1	Matthew Sates	South Africa	1:47.75	
7	7	Calum Jarvis	Wales	1:47.84	
8	8	Joe Litchfield	England	1:48.87	
