= Judo at the 2022 Commonwealth Games – Women's 78 kg =

Judo competition

Judo – Women's 78 kg at the 2022 Commonwealth Games
- Venue: Coventry Arena
- Dates: 3 August 2022
- Competitors: 8 from 7 nations

Medalists
gold medal	Emma Reid	England
silver medal	Natalie Powell	Wales
bronze medal	Moira de Villiers	New Zealand
bronze medal	Rachel Tytler	Scotland

The women's 78 kg judo competitions at the 2022 Commonwealth Games in Birmingham, England took place on August 3 at the Coventry Arena. A total of eight competitors from seven nations took part.

== Results ==
The draw is as follows:

Quarter-finals
Natalie Powell (WAL)	10
Franceska Agathe (MRI)	00
Ayuk Sophina (CMR)	00
Coralie Godbout (CAN)	10
Emma Reid (ENG)	10
Rachel Tytler (SCO)	00
Moira de Villiers (NZL)	10
Hayley Mackey (NZL)	00 (yellow card)

Semi-finals
Natalie Powell (WAL)	10
Coralie Godbout (CAN)	00
Emma Reid (ENG)	01 (yellow card)
Moira de Villiers (NZL)	00

Final
Natalie Powell (WAL)	00
Emma Reid (ENG)	01 (yellow card)

=== Repechages ===
Repechage
Rachel Tytler (SCO)	11
Hayley Mackey (NZL)	00
Franceska Agathe (MRI)	00
Ayuk Sophina (CMR)	10

Bronze medal
Rachel Tytler (SCO)	10
Coralie Godbout (CAN)	00
Ayuk Sophina (CMR)	00 (yellow card)
Moira de Villiers (NZL)	10
