= Emma Russell =

Emma Russell may refer to:

- Emma Russell (swimmer)
- Emma Russell (ice hockey)
