= Swimming at the 2022 Commonwealth Games – Men's 4 × 100 metre medley relay =

Men's 4 × 100 metre medley relay at the 2022 Commonwealth Games
- Venue: Sandwell Aquatics Centre
- Dates: 3 August
- Competitors: 49 from 8 nations
- Winning time: 3:31.80

Medalists
gold medal	Brodie Williams; James Wilby; James Guy; Tom Dean; Luke Greenbank*; Greg Butler*; Jacob Peters*; Jacob Whittle*	England
silver medal	Bradley Woodward; Zac Stubblety-Cook; Matthew Temple; Kyle Chalmers; Mitch Larkin*; Sam Williamson*; Cody Simpson*; William Yang*	Australia
bronze medal	Craig McNally; Ross Murdoch; Duncan Scott; Evan Jones; Martyn Walton*; Craig Benson*; Gregor Swinney*; Stephen Milne*	Scotland

The men's 4 × 100 metre medley relay event at the 2022 Commonwealth Games was held on 3 August at the Sandwell Aquatics Centre.

== Records ==
Prior to this competition, the existing world, Commonwealth and Games records were as follows:

World record	United States (USA); Ryan Murphy; Michael Andrew; Caeleb Dressel; Zach Apple	3:26.78	Tokyo, Japan	1 August 2021
Commonwealth record	Great Britain (GBR); Luke Greenbank; Adam Peaty; James Guy; Duncan Scott	3:27.51	Tokyo, Japan	1 August 2021
Games record	Australia; Mitch Larkin; Jake Packard; Grant Irvine; Kyle Chalmers	3:31.04	Gold Coast, Australia	10 April 2018

== Schedule ==
The schedule is as follows:

All times are British Summer Time (UTC+1)

Date	Time	Round
Wednesday 3 August 2022	11:10	Heats
Wednesday 3 August 2022	20:58	Final

== Results ==
=== Heats ===
Rank	Heat	Lane	Nation	Swimmers	Time	Notes
1	1	4	Australia	Mitch Larkin (54.46); Sam Williamson (1:00.15); Cody Simpson (51.49); William Yang (48.25)	3:34.35	Q
2	2	4	England	Luke Greenbank (54.28); Greg Butler (1:00.79); Jacob Peters (52.30); Jacob Whittle (48.51)	3:35.88	Q
3	1	6	Scotland	Martyn Walton (55.10); Craig Benson (1:00.25); Gregor Swinney (54.05); Stephen Milne (51.01)	3:40.41	Q
4	2	3	Wales	Liam White (55.54); Bradley Newman (1:02.67); Tom Carswell (54.78); Dan Jones (48.63)	3:41.62	Q
5	2	6	Jersey	Harry Shalamon (56.80); Robbie Jones (1:05.89); Jack Allan (56.67); Ollie Brehaut (53.32)	3:52.68	Q
6	2	2	Fiji	Hansel McCaig (1:01.37); Epeli Rabua (1:05.67); Temafa Yalimaiwai (58.05); David Young (52.34)	3:57.43	Q
7	1	2	Guernsey	Samuel Lowe (1:00.38); Ronny Hallett (1:06.67); Charlie-Joe Hallett (57.02); Jonathan Beck (55.40)	3:59.47	Q
	1	3	Singapore		DNS	
	1	5	South Africa	Andrew Ross; Michael Houlie; Guy Brooks; Clayton Jimmie	DNS	
	2	7	Seychelles		DNS	
	2	5	Canada	Javier Acevedo; James Dergousoff; Patrick Hussey; Stephen Calkins	DSQ	

=== Final ===
Rank	Lane	Nation	Swimmers	Time	Notes
1st place, gold medalist(s)	5	England	Brodie Williams (54.02); James Wilby (59.22); James Guy (51.22); Tom Dean (47.34)	3:31.80	
2nd place, silver medalist(s)	4	Australia	Bradley Woodward (54.07); Zac Stubblety-Cook (59.92); Matthew Temple (51.03); Kyle Chalmers (46.86)	3:31.88	
3rd place, bronze medalist(s)	3	Scotland	Craig McNally (54.79); Ross Murdoch (59.59); Duncan Scott (51.74); Evan Jones (48.99)	3:35.11	NR
4	6	Wales	Joe Small (55.02); Kyle Booth (1:01.12); Lewis Fraser (52.31); Matt Richards (47.98)	3:36.43	
5	2	Jersey	Harry Shalamon (56.18); Robbie Jones (1:04.17); Isaac Dodds (56.50); Ollie Brehaut (52.86)	3:49.71	
6	7	Fiji	Hansel McCaig (1:00.70); Epeli Rabua (1:05.08); Temafa Yalimaiwai (57.78); David Young (51.75)	3:55.31	
7	1	Guernsey	Samuel Lowe (1:00.74); Ronny Hallett (1:04.96); Charlie-Joe Hallett (56.15); Jonathan Beck (54.42)	3:56.27	
