= Jersey at the 2022 Commonwealth Games =

- Flag of Jersey
- CGF code: JEY
- CGA: Commonwealth Games Association of Jersey
- Website: cgaj.org

in Birmingham, England 28 July 2022 – 8 August 2022
- Competitors: 27 (21 men and 6 women) in 8 sports
- Flag bearer (opening): Rhys Hidrio
- Flag bearer (closing): TBD
- Medals: Gold 0 Silver 0 Bronze 0 Total 0

Commonwealth Games appearances (overview)
- 1958; 1962; 1966; 1970; 1974; 1978; 1982; 1986; 1990; 1994; 1998; 2002; 2006; 2010; 2014; 2018; 2022; 2026; 2030

Jersey competed at the 2022 Commonwealth Games in Birmingham, England between 28 July and 8 August 2022. Having made its Games debut in 1958, it was Jersey's seventeenth appearance to date.

Cyclist Rhys Hidrio was the delegation's opening ceremony flagbearer.

== Competitors ==
Jersey received a quota of 30 open allocation slots from Commonwealth Sport, of which 26 were accepted. This quota is used to determine the overall team in sports lacking a qualifying system.

The following is the list of number of competitors participating at the Games per sport/discipline.

Sport	Men	Women	Total
Athletics	2	1	3
Boxing	1	0	1
Cycling	5	2	7
Gymnastics	1	0	1
Lawn bowls	5	0	5
Swimming	5	2	7
Table tennis	1	1	2
Triathlon	1	0	1
Total	21	6	27

== Athletics ==
Two athletes were officially selected on 16 October 2021. Two more were added on 8 April 2022.

Men
Track & road events

Athlete	Event	Heat		Semifinal		Final	
Athlete	Event	Result	Rank	Result	Rank	Result	Rank
Zachary Saunders	100 m	10.76	5	did not advance			
Zachary Saunders	200 m	21.35	4	did not advance			

Field events

Athlete	Event	Qualification		Final	
Athlete	Event	Distance	Rank	Distance	Rank
Zane Duquemin	Discus throw	58.87	7 q	57.97	11

Women
Field events

Athlete	Event	Final	
Athlete	Event	Distance	Rank
Shadine Duquemin	Discus throw	52.87	10

== Boxing ==
On 27 April 2022, Jersey selected Tom Frame for the men's light-welterweight (63.5 kg) division.

Men

Athlete	Event	Round of 32	Round of 16	Quarterfinals	Semifinals	Final	
Athlete	Event	Opposition Result	Opposition Result	Opposition Result	Opposition Result	Opposition Result	Rank
Tom Frame	Light welterweight	Colin (MRI); L 0 - 5	did not advance				

== Cycling ==
Four cyclists were officially selected on 16 October 2021. Two more were added on 8 April 2022 and another on 2 June 2022.

=== Road ===
Men

Athlete	Event	Time	Rank
Zack Hamon	Road race	3:43:19	72
Rhys Hidrio	Road race	3:37:08	28
Rhys Pilley	Road race	DNF	
Jack Rebours	Road race	DNF	
Dean Robson	Road race	3:37:08	41
Jack Rebours	Time trial	53:21.99	25
Dean Robson	Time trial	54:39.14	29

Women

Athlete	Event	Time	Rank
Emily Bridson	Road race	DNF	

=== Track ===
Time trial

Athlete	Event	Time	Rank
Rhys Pilley	Men's time trial	1:05.630	16

Pursuit

Athlete	Event	Qualification		Final	
Athlete	Event	Time	Rank	Opponent Results	Rank
Rhys Pilley	Men's individual pursuit	4:34.787	17	did not advance	

=== Mountain Biking ===
Athlete	Event	Time	Rank
Rhys Hidrio	Men’s cross-country	1:41:20	10
Emily Bridson	Women’s cross-country	DNF	
Lisa Mansell	Women’s cross-country	LAP	

== Gymnastics ==
One gymnast was officially selected on 16 October 2021.

=== Artistic ===
Men
Individual Qualification

Athlete	Event	Apparatus						Total	Rank
Athlete	Event	F	PH	R	V	PB	HB	Total	Rank
Daniel Lee	Qualification	12.850	11.900	13.300	14.350	13.600	12.050	78.050	11 Q

Individual Finals

Athlete	Event	Apparatus						Total	Rank
Athlete	Event	F	PH	R	V	PB	HB	Total	Rank
Daniel Lee	All-around	12.700	12.450	12.900	14.150	14.000	13.250	79.450	6
Daniel Lee	Rings	—		12.900	—			12.900	7

== Lawn bowls ==
A squad of five men was officially selected on 16 October 2021. Event-specific selections will be made in due course.

Athlete	Event	Group Stage					Quarterfinal	Semifinal	Final / BM	
Athlete	Event	Opposition Score	Opposition Score	Opposition Score	Opposition Score	Rank	Opposition Score	Opposition Score	Opposition Score	Rank
Ross Davis	Men's Singles	McIlroy (NZL); W 21 - 19	Locke (FLK); W 21 - 7	McLean (SCO); L 13 - 21	Borgohain (IND); W 21 - 13	2 Q	Abd Muin (MAS); L 12 - 21	did not advance		
Derek Boswell; Ross Davis	Men's Pairs	Scotland; L 7 - 22	Niue; W 27 - 9	Canada; W 20 - 13	New Zealand; T 15 - 15	2 Q	England; L 6 - 19	did not advance		
Scott Ruderham; Greg Davis; Malcolm De Sousa	Men's Triples	Cook Islands; W 19 - 11	Niue; W 26 - 9	Australia; L 14 - 15	—	2 Q	England; L 11 - 16	did not advance		
Scott Ruderham; Malcolm De Sousa; Greg Davis; Derek Boswell	Men's Fours	New Zealand; L 9 - 22	Malta; W 19 - 11	Scotland; W 13 - 8	South Africa; L 10 - 17	4	did not advance			

== Swimming ==
Three swimmers were officially selected on 16 October 2021, with a fourth added on 27 April 2022, and three more on 3 June 2022.

Men

Athlete	Event	Heat		Semifinal		Final	
Athlete	Event	Time	Rank	Time	Rank	Time	Rank
Jack Allan	50 m freestyle	24.98	51	did not advance			
Ollie Brehaut	50 m freestyle	24.15	31	did not advance			
Harry Shalamon	50 m freestyle	24.04	29	did not advance			
Jack Allan	100 m freestyle	54.67	52	did not advance			
Ollie Brehaut	100 m freestyle	52.52	32	did not advance			
Ollie Brehaut	200 m freestyle	2:00.62	33	—		did not advance	
Isaac Dodds	400 m freestyle	4:01.50	18	—		did not advance	
Isaac Dodds	1500 m freestyle	16:21.80	10	—		did not advance	
Robbie Jones	50 m backstroke	27.70	29	did not advance			
Harry Shalamon	50 m backstroke	25.93	17 R	25.85	14	did not advance	
Harry Shalamon	100 m backstroke	56.07	16 Q	56.25	15	did not advance	
Isaac Dodds	200 m backstroke	2:10.80	15	—		did not advance	
Robbie Jonees	100 m breaststroke	1:04.06	22	did not advance			
Robbie Jonees	200 m breaststroke	2:20.11	11	—		did not advance	
Jack Allan	50 m butterfly	25.51	28	did not advance			
Ollie Brehaut	50 m butterfly	26.72	44	did not advance			
Jack Allan	100 m butterfly	57.10	32	did not advance			
Robbie Jones	100 m butterfly	56.83	28	did not advance			
Harry Shalamon	100 m butterfly	54.89	23	did not advance			
Isaac Dodds	200 m butterfly	2:06.41	14	—		did not advance	
Isaac Dodds	200 m individual medley	2:09.11	16	—		did not advance	
Robbie Jones	200 m individual medley	2:08.02	15	—		did not advance	
Isaac Dodds	400 m individual medley	4:29.70	9	—		did not advance	
Robbie Jones; Harry Shalamon; Ollie Brehaut; Isaac Dodds	4 × 100 m freestyle relay	3:33.46	9	—		did not advance	
Harry Shalamon; Robbie Jones; Jack Allan; Ollie Brehaut	4 × 100 m medley relay	3:52.68	5 Q	—		3:49.71	5

Women

Athlete	Event	Heat		Semifinal		Final	
Athlete	Event	Time	Rank	Time	Rank	Time	Rank
Gemma Atherley	50 m freestyle	28.76	51	did not advance			
Gemma Atherley	100 m freestyle	59.74	31	did not advance			
Gemma Atherley	200 m freestyle	2:06.47	15	—		did not advance	
Gemma Atherley	50 m backstroke	29.93	14 Q	30.06	16	did not advance	
Gemma Atherley	100 m backstroke	1:04.20	17	did not advance			
Gemma Atherley	200 m backstroke	2:17.47	7 Q	—		2:18.53	8
Gemma Atherley	50 m butterfly	28.51	27	did not advance			
Lily Scott	50 m freestyle	26.95	23	did not advance			
Lily Scott	100 m freestyle	57.84	23	did not advance			
Lily Scott	200 m freestyle	2:05.25	14	—		did not advance	
Lily Scott	400 m freestyle	4:35.04	16	—		did not advance	
Lily Scott	800 m freestyle	9:27.99	9	—		did not advance	
Lily Scott	50 m butterfly	29.05	30	did not advance			

Mixed

Athlete	Event	Heat		Final	
Athlete	Event	Time	Rank	Time	Rank
Ollie Brehaut; Jack Allan; Gemma Atherley; Lily Scott	4 × 100 m freestyle relay	3:42.92	7 Q	3:42.21	7
Gemma Atherley; Robbie Jones; Harry Shalamon; Lily Scott	4 × 100 m medley relay	4:00.49	7 Q	4:01.10	7

== Table tennis ==
Two players were officially selected on 3 April 2022.

Singles

Athletes	Event	Group stage			Round of 32	Round of 16	Quarterfinal	Semifinal	Final / BM	
Athletes	Event	Opposition Score	Opposition Score	Rank	Opposition Score	Opposition Score	Opposition Score	Opposition Score	Opposition Score	Rank
Jordan Wykes	Men's singles	Rumgay (SCO); L 0 - 4	Baboolall (MRI); W 4 - 2	2	did not advance					
Hannah Silcock	Women's singles	Hosenally (MRI); W 4 - 1	Seera (UGA); W 4 - 1	1 Q	Ho (ENG); L 2 - 4	did not advance				

Doubles

Athletes	Event	Round of 64	Round of 32	Round of 16	Quarterfinal	Semifinal	Final / BM	
Athletes	Event	Opposition Score	Opposition Score	Opposition Score	Opposition Score	Opposition Score	Opposition Score	Rank
Jordan Wykes; Hannah Silcock	Mixed doubles	Yiangou / Meletie (CYP); W 3 - 1	Ly / Gauthier (CAN); L 0 - 3	did not advance				

== Triathlon ==
One triathlete was officially selected on 16 October 2021.

Individual

Athlete	Event	Swim (750 m)	Trans 1	Bike (20 km)	Trans 2	Run (5 km)	Total	Rank
Oliver Turner	Men's	8:41	0:52	26:17	0:16	16:38	52:44	15
