= Alicia Kok Shun =

Mauritian swimmer (born 2004)

Personal information
- Full name: Alicia Kimberley Kok Shun
- Nationality: Mauritian
- Born: 20 November 2004 (age 21)

Sport
- Sport: Swimming
Medal record
Women's swimming
Representing Mauritius
African Championships
Silver medal – second place	2022 Tunis	50 m breaststroke

Alicia Kimberley Kok Shun (born 20 November 2004) is a Mauritian swimmer. She competed for Mauritius at the 2020 Summer Olympics in the women's 100 metre breaststroke.

She also competed for Mauritius at the 2022 Commonwealth Games in the women's 50 metre freestyle and women's 100 metre freestyle events.
