= Unilez Takyi =

Ghanaian swimmer (born 2004)

Personal information
- Full name: Unilez Yebowaah Takyi
- Nationality: Ghanaian
- Born: 20 August 2004 (age 22) Mantua, Italy
- Height: 1.72 m (5 ft 8 in)

Sport
- Sport: Swimming
- Strokes: Freestyle (50 m & 100 m); Breaststroke (50 m & 100 m)

Unilez Yebowaah Takyi (born 20 August 2004) is a Ghanaian swimmer who was born in Italy. She competed in the women's 50 metre freestyle at the delayed 2020 Summer Olympics, held in 2021. At the 2021 FINA World Swimming Championships (25 m), Takyi competed in the women's 50 metre freestyle and 100 metre breaststroke.

Takyi was a competitor at the 2022 Commonwealth Games in the women's 50 metre freestyle, 50 metre breaststroke, and 100 metre freestyle events. She competed in the same three events at the delayed 2023 African Games, held in 2024, where she was the teammate of Joselle Mensah. At the 2024 World Aquatics Championships, she competed in the women's 50 metre freestyle and 100 metre freestyle events.

== Early life and education ==
Takyi was born in Italy to Ychetche Kodjo Rosine and Takyi Agyepong. As at 2021, she attends Alessandra Manzoni Scientific School where she is studying minerals.
