= Rachel Tytler =

British judoka (born 1997)

Personal information
- Nationality: British (Scottish)
- Born: 25 June 1997 (age 29) Scotland

Sport
- Sport: Judo
- Event: -78kg
- Club: ProJudo
Medal record
Women's judo
Representing Scotland
Commonwealth Games
Bronze medal – third place	2022 Birmingham	-78 kg

Rachel Tytler (born 25 June 1997) is a Scottish international judoka. She has represented Scotland at the Commonwealth Games and won a bronze medal.

== Biography ==
Tytler educated at the University of Stirling won a bronze medal at the 2021 British Championships.

In 2022, she was selected for the 2022 Commonwealth Games in Birmingham, where she competed in the women's -78 kg category, winning the bronze medal.
