= Sophia Green =

Scottish triathlete

Personal information
- Born: 2000
- Home town: Elgin

Sport
- Country: Scotland
- Sport: Triathlon

Sophia Green (born 2000) is a Scottish triathlete. She competed at the 2022 Commonwealth Games in Women's Triathlon .

She studied at University of Stirling.

She competed at 2021 Europe Triathlon Cup Coimbra finishing first, and 2022 Europe Triathlon Cup Coimbra finishing 15th.

She trains with Moray Road Runners, and Moray Firth Triathlon Club.

She competed at the 2022 Commonwealth Games where she came 17th in the women's event.
