= Collyn Gagne =

Canadian swimmer (born 2001)

Personal information
- Born: November 20, 2000 (age 25)
- Home town: Milton, Ontario, Canada
- Height: 182 cm (6 ft 0 in)

Sport
- Country: Canada
- Sport: Swimming
- Strokes: Backstroke, medleys
- Club: Simon Fraser Aquatics
- Coach: Liam Donnelly
Medal record
Men's swimming
Representing Canada
Pan American Games
Silver medal – second place	2023 Santiago	400 m medley

Collyn Gagne (born November 20, 2000) is a Canadian swimmer. He won a silver in the 400 m individual medley at the 2023 Pan American Games in Santiago. Gagne was born in Milton, Ontario and grew up in Oakville, Ontario, he went to Simon Fraser University where he was a member of their swim team.
