= Hayley Mackey =

New Zealand judoka

Personal information
- Full name: Hayley Mackey
- Nationality: New Zealand
- Born: 4 May 2001 (age 25)

Sport
- Country: New Zealand
- Sport: Judo
- Event: Women's Under 78 kg
- Updated on 10 July 2022

Hayley Mackey (born 4 May 2001) is a New Zealand judoka.

In 2022, Mackey won a bronze medal at the Tunis Open. She has been selected to represent New Zealand at the 2022 Commonwealth Games.
