= Evan Jones (swimmer) =

Scottish swimmer (born 2004)

Personal information
- Born: 5 June 2004 (age 22)

Sport
- Country: Great Britain; Scotland
- Sport: Swimming
- Event: Freestyle / Butterfly
Medal record
Representing Great Britain
World Championships (LC)
Gold medal – first place	2025 Singapore	4×200 m freestyle
European Junior Championships
Gold medal – first place	2022 Otopeni	4x100 m medley
Silver medal – second place	2021 Rome	4x100 m mixed medley
Silver medal – second place	2022 Otopeni	4x100 m freestyle
Representing Scotland
Commonwealth Games
Bronze medal – third place	2022 Birmingham	4 × 200 m freestyle
Bronze medal – third place	2022 Birmingham	4 × 100 m medley

Evan Jones (born 5 June 2004) is a Scottish swimmer.

Jones was born in Scotland to English parents.

In 2022, Jones swam butterfly in the British 4 × 100 medley relay team which won gold at the European Junior Swimming Championships. At the Commonwealth Games in Birmingham, Jones was a bronze medalist in the 4 × 200 m freestyle and 4 × 100 m medley relays, swimming the freestyle leg of the latter.
