= Mark Szaranek =

Scottish swimmer (born 1995)

Personal information
- Nationality: Scottish
- Born: 16 August 1995 (age 31) Kirkcaldy, Scotland
- Height: 1.89 m (6 ft 2 in)
- Weight: 86 kg (190 lb)

Sport
- Sport: Swimming
- Club: Cali Condors; University of Stirling
- College team: University of Florida
- Coach: John Szaranek; Gregg Troy
Medal record
Men's swimming
Representing Great Britain
European Junior Championships
Bronze medal – third place	2013 Poznan	200 m medley
Bronze medal – third place	2013 Poznan	4x100 m mixed freestyle
Representing Scotland
Commonwealth Games
Silver medal – second place	2018 Gold Coast	400 m medley
Bronze medal – third place	2018 Gold Coast	4×200 m freestyle
Bronze medal – third place	2022 Birmingham	4×200 m freestyle
Representing the Florida Gators
Event	1st	2nd	3rd
NCAA Championships	2	2	6
Total	2	2	6
By race
Event	1st	2nd	3rd
200 y breaststroke	0	0	1
200 y medley	1	0	1
400 y medley	0	0	1
4×50 y freestyle	1	0	0
4×100 y freestyle	0	2	1
4×200 y freestyle	0	0	1
4×50 y medley	0	0	1
Total	2	2	6
NCAA Championships
Gold medal – first place	2017 Indianapolis	200 y medley
Gold medal – first place	2018 Minneapolis	4×50 y freestyle
Silver medal – second place	2017 Indianapolis	4×100 y freestyle
Silver medal – second place	2018 Minneapolis	4×100 y freestyle
Bronze medal – third place	2016 Atlanta	4×100 y freestyle
Bronze medal – third place	2017 Indianapolis	400 y medley
Bronze medal – third place	2017 Indianapolis	4×200 y freestyle
Bronze medal – third place	2018 Minneapolis	200 y breaststroke
Bronze medal – third place	2018 Minneapolis	200 y medley
Bronze medal – third place	2018 Minneapolis	4x50 y medley

Mark Szaranek (born 16 August 1995) is a Scottish swimmer. He currently represents the Cali Condors which is part of the International Swimming League. Szaranek's swimming career began with his father, John, as coach. He first trained at Glenrothes Swimming Club and was coached by his father at Carnegie swimming club and then the University of Edinburgh where he is performance coach.

== Career ==
At the 2017 World Championships, Budapest he competed in the British team in the Men's 200 meter and 400 meter Individual medley events.

At the 2018 Commonwealth Games Szaranek won a silver medal in the Men's 400 meter individual medley with a personal best time of 4:13.72.

In 2019, he was a member of the inaugural International Swimming League representing the Cali Condors, who finished third place in the final match in Las Vegas, Nevada in December. Szaranek placed 2nd in the 400 meter IM two times during the season as well as strong finishes in the 200 meter IM and 200 meter butterfly.
