= Emma Russell (swimmer) =

Scottish swimmer

Personal information
- Nationality: Scottish
- Born: 27 December 2003 (age 22)

Sport
- Sport: Swimming
Medal record
European Championships (LC)
Gold medal – first place	2020 Budapest	4×100m freestyle
Gold medal – first place	2020 Budapest	4×200 m freestyle
European Junior Championships
Silver medal – second place	2019 Kazan	4x200 m freestyle

Emma Russell (born 27 December 2003) is a Scottish swimmer. She competed in the women's 50 metre freestyle event at the 2020 European Aquatics Championships, in Budapest, Hungary.
