= Sandwell Aquatics Centre =

Swimming venue in Birmingham, England

Coordinates: 52.489600°N 1.989395°W

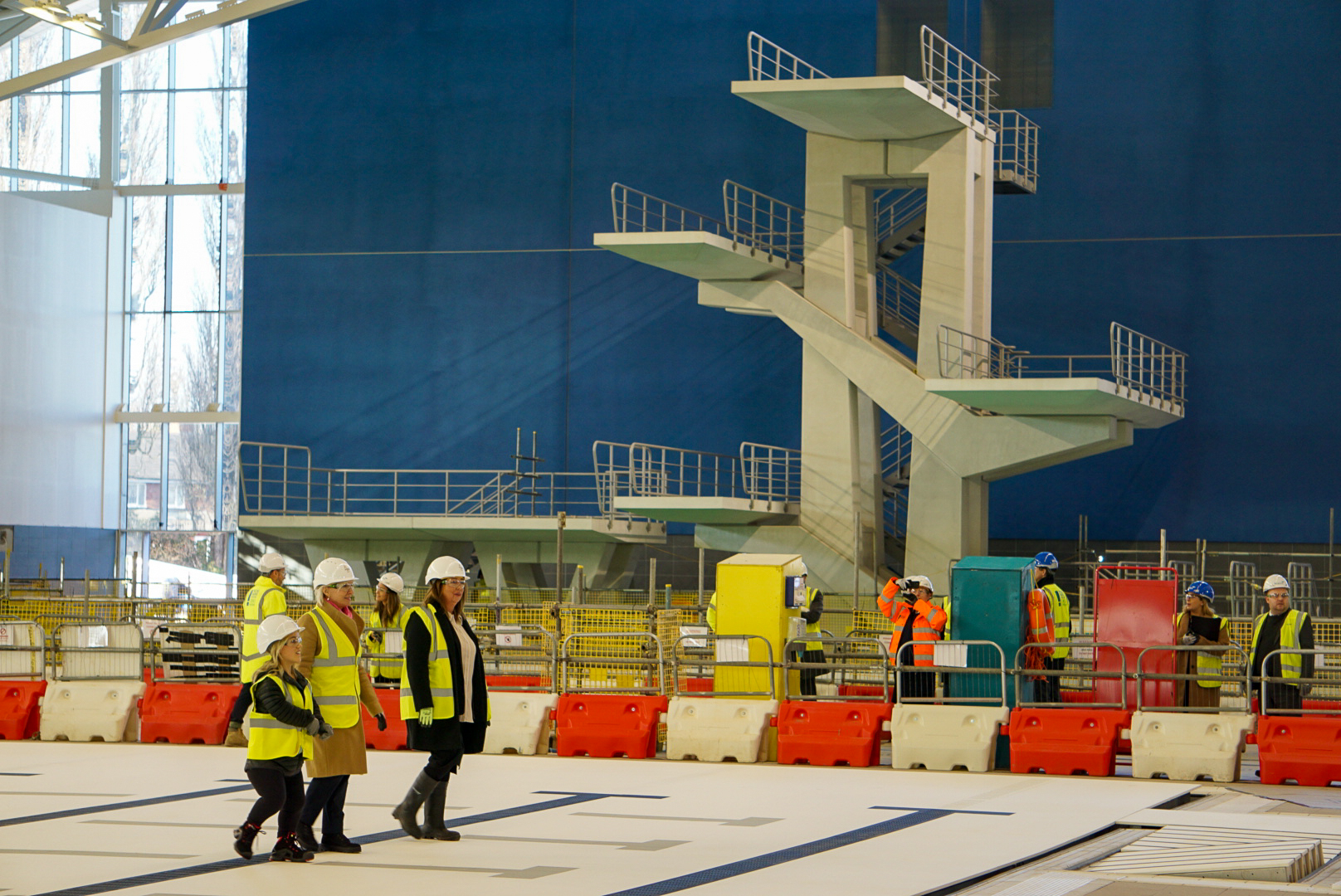
- Venue under construction
- Interactive map of Sandwell Aquatics Centre
- Location: Smethwick, B67 7EP
- Operator: Sandwell Leisure Trust
- Capacity: 5,000 (1,000 post Commonwealth Games)

Construction
- Groundbreaking: January 2020
- Opened: May 2023
- Cost: £73 million
- Architect: Roberts Limbrick Architects

Tenant
- 2022 Commonwealth Games

Sandwell Aquatics Centre is an indoor facility located in Londonderry, Smethwick, West Midlands, England. It contains an Olympic-size swimming pool (one of only two in the West Midlands region), a 10-metre diving board with 25-metre pool (the only one in the whole of the Midlands), a community swimming pool and permanent seating for 1,000 spectators with an additional 4,000 seats during the Games. Construction began in January 2020 and opened on 12 April 2022 to mark 100 days until the start of the Commonwealth Games in Birmingham.

The centre was initially used for the 2022 Commonwealth Games and was the only venue constructed for the games. After the games, the centre is scheduled to be redeveloped and will officially open for public use in May 2023 when it will be operated by the Sandwell Leisure Trust. During the redevelopment, seating used for the Games will be removed and two 4-court sports halls, a 108-station gym, a 28-station ladies-only gym, three activity studios, an indoor cycling studio, a sauna, a steam room, a football pitch with changing facilities, a dry diving area, an urban park and children's playground, and café will be created.

Funding for the centre comes from several sources. Sandwell Metropolitan Borough Council is contributing £27 million, with £38.5 million coming from the overall Birmingham 2022 Commonwealth Games budget. A further £7.6 million is from Sport England, Black Country LEP, Sandwell Leisure Trust (SLT) and University of Wolverhampton.

The venue hosted its first major event since the Commonwealth Games on 4 and 5 November 2023, the Swim England West Midlands Winter Championships. Then on 18 May 2024, the pool hosted its first underwater hockey tournament.

== See also ==
- List of long course swimming pools in the United Kingdom
