= 2026 Aquatics GB Swimming Championships =

British swimming event

- Venue: London Aquatics Centre
- Location: London
- Start date: 14 April
- End date: 21 April

The 2026 Aquatics GB Swimming Championships (sponsored by Speedo) were held at the London Aquatics Centre in London from 14 to 21 April 2026. They were organised by Aquatics GB, formerly British Swimming, and were the third edition of the event to be held under the new name.

As there are neither Olympic Games nor World Championships in the even numbered non-Olympic years, the event also acts as the main qualification event for the Great Britain team for the 2026 European Aquatics Championships in Paris. The top two finishers in each race, if they meet the qualification time are automatically selected for Paris (from a possible four berths per event).

Additionally, the event is also the main qualification event for the England, Scotland and Wales teams at the 2026 Commonwealth Games in Glasgow. Anyone meeting the qualification time for the European Championships will automatically meet their nations standard for the Commonwealth Games.

For Northern Ireland swimmers it is one of two such Commonwealth Games qualification events, along with the 2026 Irish Open Swimming Championships, in recognition of the fact that Northern Ireland swimmers can represent either Great Britain or Ireland at European and Olympic level, but will represent Northern Ireland together at the Commonwealth Games. While the event is also open to swimmers from the Isle of Man, Jersey and Guernsey, who are eligible for the Great Britain team, it is not a direct qualification event for those nations at Commonwealth level.

In addition, aggregated times of the top four swimmers in a relay event could qualify a swimmer via a relay slot at the European Championships.

All 2025 World medallists also had automatic qualification in their event. The sprinter Ben Proud, having left 'traditional' swimming to join the controversial Enhanced Games, was ineligible, so the only medallists eligible were the World gold medal-winning 4 x 200 freestyle relay team of James Guy, Jack McMillan, Matt Richards, Duncan Scott, Evan Jones and Tom Dean. In the event, the top four swimmers in the 200m freestyle matched he four final swimmers from the 2025 World final, and combined for a qualification time.

== Medal winners ==
Key:Qualification for European Aquatics Championships
: qualified for European Championships
Key:Qualification for Commonwealth Games
: qualified for England CWG team ; : qualified for Scotland CWG team. ; : qualified for Wales CWG team; qualified for Northern Ireland CWG team

=== Men's events ===
Event	Gold		Silver		Bronze	
50 m freestyle	Jacob Mills	21.91	Matt Richards	22.07	Gabriel Shepherd	22.12
100 m freestyle	Matt Richards	47.53	Jacob Mills	48.09	Jacob Whittle	48.52
200 m freestyle	Matt Richards	1:44.77	James Guy	1:45.38	Duncan Scott	1:45.44
400 m freestyle	James Guy	3:44.04	Jack McMillan	3:46.82	Tyler Melbourne-Smith	3:47.17
800 m freestyle	Reece Grady	7:56.42	Luke Hornsey	8:00.18	Sean McCann	8:00.45
1500 m freestyle	Reece Grady	15:14.76	Alexander Sargeant	15:20.49	Luke Hornsey	15:23.73
50 m backstroke	Oliver Morgan	24.36	Jack Skerry	24.66	Cameron Brooker	24.85
100 m backstroke	Oliver Morgan	52.41	Matthew Ward	53.58	Cameron Brooker	53.69
200 m backstroke	Oliver Morgan	1:55.86	Luke Greenbank	1:56.01	Jack Skerry	1:57.60
50m breaststroke	Adam Peaty	26.64	Filip Nowacki	27.10	Max Morgan	27.22
50m breaststroke	Adam Peaty	26.64	Filip Nowacki	27.10	Archie Goodburn	27.22
100 m breaststroke	Adam Peaty	58.97	Filip Nowacki	59.39	Max Morgan	59.56
200 m breaststroke	Filip Nowacki	2:08.52	Greg Butler	2:09.51	Christian Ryan	2:12.09
50 m butterfly	Joshua Gammon	23.10	Jacob Peters	23.11	Kieran Grant	23.24
100 m butterfly	Edward Mildred	51.02	Jacob Peters	51.34	Lewis Fraser	51.81
200 m butterfly	Duncan Scott	1:54.97	Ed Mildred	1:55.03	Luke Greenbank	1:57.80
200 m ind. medley	Duncan Scott	1:56.08	Evan Jones	1:58.09	Max Litchfield	1:58.70
400 m ind. medley	Max Litchfield	4:11.69	Charlie Hutchinson	4:15.79	George Smith	4:18.39

=== Women's events ===
Event	Gold		Silver		Bronze	
50 m freestyle	Eva Okaro	24.42	Theodora Taylor	24.59	Darcy Revitt	24.77
100 m freestyle	Eva Okaro	53.75	Evelyn Davis	53.99	Freya Colbert	54.02
200 m freestyle	Freya Colbert	1:54.34 NR	Freya Anderson	1:57.00	Leah Schlosshan	1:57.49
400 m freestyle	Freya Colbert	4:06.91	Lucy Fox	4:10.08	Amalie Smith	4:11.13
800 m freestyle	Amelie Blocksidge	8:33.02	Alexandra Bastone	8:40.79	Lucy Parsons	8:40.93
1500 m freestyle	Amelie Blocksidge	16:22.93	Abbie Roscoe	16:32.58	Lucy Parsons	16:36.79
50 m backstroke	Lauren Cox	27.39	Blythe Kinsman	28.10	Medi Harris	28.67
100 m backstroke	Lauren Cox	59.66	Blythe Kinsman	1:00.84	Katie Shanahan	1:01.10
200 m backstroke	Katie Shanahan	2:09.89	Honey Osrin	2:10.12	Holly McGill	2:11.71
50 m breaststroke	Imogen Clark	30.69	Anna Morgan	30.83	Gabrielle Idle-Beavers	31.11
100 m breaststroke	Angharad Evans	1:04.96 NR	Gabrielle Idle-Beavers	1:07.69	not awarded	
100 m breaststroke	Angharad Evans	1:04.96 NR	Anna Morgan	1:07.69	not awarded	
200 m breaststroke	Angharad Evans	2:19.70 NR	Abbie Wood	2:24.72	Anna Morgan	2:26.40
50 m butterfly	Eva Okaro	25.95	Harriet Rogers	26.28	Ciara Schlosshan	26.38
100 m butterfly	Keanna Macinnes	57.57	Ciara Schlosshan	58.41	Lucy Grieve	58.56
200 m butterfly	Keanna Macinnes	2:07.02	Emily Richards	2:07.70	Ciara Schlosshan	2:08.63
200 m ind. medley	Abbie Wood	2:08.17	Freya Colbert	2:10.82	Amalie Smith	2:11.18
400 m ind. medley	Amalie Smith	4:35.46	Suzie McNair	4:47.32	Evi Mackie	4:47.87

== Relay qualification ==
Relay events were not held, but the total times of swimmers in relevant events - 100 m freestyle, 200 metre freestyle and 100 metre in each of the three stroke events were aggregate for relay consideration for the 2026 European Aquatics Championships:

	Men			Women			Mixed
	4 x 100 m freestyle	4 x 200 m freestyle	4 x 100 m medley	4 x 100 m freestyle	4 x 200 m freestyle	4 x 100 m medley	4 x 100 m medley
Relay consideration times	3:14.01	7:08.47	3:33.15	3:37.48	7:54.25	3:58.07	3:44.10
Swimmers	Matt Richards; Jacob Mills; Jacob Whittle; Gabriel Shepherd	James Guy; Matt Richards; Duncan Scott; Jack McMillan Evan Jones; Tom Dean	Oliver Morgan; Adam Peaty; Edward Mildred; Matt Richards	Eva Okaro; Evelyn Davis; Freya Colbert; Freya Anderson	Freya Colbert; Freya Anderson; Leah Schlosshan; Theodora Taylor	Lauren Cox; Angharad Evans; Keanna Macinnes; Eva Okaro	Lauren Cox*; Oliver Morgan; Angharad Evans; Adam Peaty*; Keanna Macinnes; Edward Mildred*; Eva Okaro*; Matt Richards
Aggregate time	3:12.67 Q	7:01.50 Q	3:29.93 Q	3:35.95 Q	7:47.14 Q	3:55.94 Q	3:42.27 Q

== Para-swimming championships ==
Mixed classification para-swimming championships were also held alongside the main elite championships, employing the British para-swimming points system.

=== Men's events ===
Event	Gold				Silver				Bronze			
Event	Swimmer	Points	Class	Time	Swimmer	Points	Class	Time	Swimmer	Points	Class	Time
50m freestyle	Matthew Redfern	768 pts	S13	25.45	Stephen Clegg	760 pts	S12	25.19	Bruce Dee	749 pts	S6	31.45
100m freestyle	Kieran Williams	772 pts	S10	55.26	Bruce Dee	741 pts	S6	1:09.26	Matthew Redfern	704 pts	S13	56.93
100m freestyle S14	William Ellard	1010 pts	S14	50.41	Rhys Darbey	869 pts	S14	53.00	Dylan Broom	854 pts	S14	53.31
200m freestyle	William Ellard	958 pts	S14	1:52.65	Dylan Broom	861 pts	S14	1:56.75	Rhys Darbey	839 pts	S14	1:57.76
400m freestyle	Sam Downie	795 pts	S8	4:44.07	Kieran Williams	776 pts	S10	4:18.67	Max Davies	756 pts	S8	4:48.94
100m backstroke	Mark Tompsett	884 pts	S14	58.32	Stephen Clegg	863 pts	S12	1:01.98	Sam Downie	740 pts	S8	1:10.53
100m breaststroke	Bruce Dee	870 pts	S6	1:21.25	Harry Stewart	849 pts	S14	1:06.02	Kai Bradford	799 pts	S8	1:13.72
50m butterfly	Bruce Dee	838 pts	S6	32.91	none awarded							
100m butterfly	William Ellard	965 pts	S14	54.81	Stephen Clegg	859 pts	S12	59.74	Mark Tompsett	841 pts	S14	57.39
200m ind. medley	Rhys Darbey	955 pts	S14	2:07.33	Bruce Dee	883 pts	S6	2:43.32	Dylan Broom	808 pts	S14	2:14.62

=== Women's events ===
Event	Gold				Silver				Bronze			
Event	Swimmer	Points	Class	Time	Swimmer	Points	Class	Time	Swimmer	Points	Class	Time
50m freestyle	CA Warrington	943 pts	S10	27.63	Alice Tai	933 pts	S8	30.60	Scarlett Humphrey	862 pts	S11	30.42
100m freestyle	Faye Rogers	921 pts	S10	1:00.72	CA Warrington	906 pts	S10	1:01.05	Scarlett Humphrey	810 pts	S11	1:09.60
100m freestyle S14	Poppy Maskill	974 pts	S14	57.06	Bethany Firth	918 pts	S14	58.20	Georgia Sheffield	913 pts	S14	58.32
200m freestyle	Georgia Sheffield	923 pts	S14	2:07.65	Olivia Newman-B	916 pts	S14	2:07.97	Bethany Firth	903 pts	S14	2:08.60
400m freestyle	Alice Tai	917 pts	S8	4:55.52	Faye Rogers	911 pts	S10	4:37.67	Brooklyn Hale	841 pts	S9	4:56.00
100m backstroke	Bethany Firth	1021 pts	S14	1:04.19	Alice Tai	937 pts	S8	1:10.55	Poppy Maskill	922 pts	S14	1:06.42
100m breaststroke	Brock Whiston	978 pts	S8	1:20.32	Grace Harvey	973 pts	S5	1:41.62	Iona Winnifrith	840 pts	S7	1:29.56
50m butterfly	Iona Winnifrith	669 pts	S7	37.72	Nancy Jubb	550 pts	S6	42.16	not awarded			
100m butterfly	Poppy Maskill	1052 pts	S14	1:01.52	Faye Rogers	992 pts	S10	1:04.48	Alice Tai	956 pts	S8	1:10.76
200m ind. medley	Olivia Newman-B	952 pts	S14	2:24.22	Faye Rogers	903 pts	S10	2:31.87	Alice Tai	897 pts	S8	2:46.12

== See also ==
- List of British champions in swimming
