= Swimming at the 2026 Commonwealth Games – Women's 4 × 100 metre freestyle relay =

Women's 4 × 100 metre freestyle relay at the 2026 Commonwealth Games
- Venue: Tollcross International Swimming Centre
- Dates: 24 July
- Nations: 10
- Winning time: 3:31.40

Medalists
gold medal	Meg Harris; Shayna Jack; Alexandria Perkins; Mollie O'Callaghan; Hannah Casey; Brittany Castelluzzo; Inez Miller; Jessica Cole	Australia
silver medal	Eva Okaro; Freya Colbert; Leah Schlosshan; Freya Anderson; Abbie Wood; Erin Little; Darcy Revitt; Amalie Smith	England
bronze medal	Aimee Canny; Rebecca Meder; Erin Gallagher; Olivia Nel; Georgia Nel; Jessica Thompson; Caitlin de Lange	South Africa

The women's 4 × 100 metre freestyle relay event at the 2026 Commonwealth Games will be held on 24 July at the Tollcross International Swimming Centre.

== Schedule ==
The schedule is as follows:

All times are British Summer Time (UTC+1)

Date	Time	Round
Friday 24 July 2026	10:30	Heats
Friday 24 July 2026	19:00	Final

== Results ==
=== Heats ===
The heats were held on the morning of 24 July 2026.

Heat results
Rank	Heat	Lane	Nation	Swimmers	Time	Notes
1	2	4	Australia	Hannah Casey; Brittany Castelluzzo; Inez Miller; Jessica Cole	3:37.95	Q
2	1	4	England	Abbie Wood; Erin Little; Darcy Revitt; Amalie Smith	3:40.92	Q
3	2	3	Wales	Meghan Higgs; Medi Harris; Bex Sutton; Sophie Davies	3:42.41	Q
4	1	5	Scotland	Megan Barnes; Lucy Hope; Evi Mackie; Lucy Grieve	3:43.69	Q
5	2	6	South Africa	Georgia Nel; Rebecca Meder; Jessica Thompson; Caitlin de Lange	3:43.87	Q
6	1	3	Northern Ireland	Danielle Hill; Emily Hughes; Ellie McCartney; Victoria Catterson	3:44.08	Q
7	2	2	Guernsey	Tatiana Tostevin; Tallulah-Mae Rautenbach; Emma Bourgaize; Orla Rabey	3:55.88	Q
8	1	6	Cayman Islands	Kyra Rabess; Sierrah Broadbelt; Harper Barrowman; Riley Watson	3:58.11	Q
9	1	2	Isle of Man	Ella Justice; Kiera Prentice; Lauren Dennett; Elizabeth Curphey	4:01.51	R
	2	5	Canada			DNS

=== Final ===
The final will take place during of the evening of 24 July 2026.

Final results
Rank	Lane	Nation	Swimmers	Time	Notes
1st place, gold medalist(s)	4	Australia	Meg Harris; Shayna Jack; Alexandria Perkins; Mollie O'Callaghan	3:31.40	
2nd place, silver medalist(s)	5	England	Eva Okaro; Freya Colbert; Leah Schlosshan; Freya Anderson	3:35.66	
3rd place, bronze medalist(s)	2	South Africa	Aimee Canny; Rebecca Meder; Erin Gallagher; Olivia Nel	3:38.67	AF
4	6	Scotland	Evelyn Davis Emma Wood; Lucy Hope; Katie Shanahan	3:39.03	
5	3	Wales	Theodora Taylor Meghan Higgs; Bex Sutton; Sophie Davies	3:39.81	
6	7	Northern Ireland	Danielle Hill; Emily Hughes; Ellie McCartney; Victoria Catterson	3:41.39	NR
7	8	Cayman Islands	Kyra Rabess; Sierrah Broadbelt; Harper Barrowman; Riley Watson	3:56.61	NR
8	1	Guernsey	Tatiana Tostevin; Tallulah-Mae Rautenbach; Emma Bourgaize; Orla Rabey	3:56.64	
