= Swimming at the 2026 Commonwealth Games – Men's 200 metre freestyle =

Men's 200 metre freestyle at the 2026 Commonwealth Games
- Venue: Tollcross International Swimming Centre
- Dates: 29 July
- Winning time: 1:45.22

Medalists
gold medal	Kai Taylor	Australia
silver medal	James Guy	England
silver medal	Matt Richards	Wales

The men's 200 metre freestyle event at the 2026 Commonwealth Games was held on 29 July at the Tollcross International Swimming Centre.

== Records ==
Prior to this competition, the existing world, Commonwealth and Games records were as follows:

Records before the 2026 Commonwealth Games
Record	Time	Athlete (nation)	Meet	Location	Date	Ref
World record	1:42.00	Paul Biedermann (GER)	2009 World Championships	Rome, Italy	28 July 2009	
Commonwealth record	1:44.06	Ian Thorpe (AUS)	2001 World Championships	Fukuoka, Japan	25 July 2001	
Games record	1:44.71	Ian Thorpe (AUS)	2002 Commonwealth Games	Manchester, England	31 July 2002	

== Schedule ==
The schedule is as follows:

All times are British Summer Time (UTC+1)

Date	Time	Round
Wednesday 29 July 2026	10:30	Heats
Wednesday 29 July 2026	19:00	Final

== Results ==
=== Heats ===
The heats was held on the morning of 29 July 2026.

Heat results
Rank	Heat	Lane	Swimmer	Nation	Time	Notes
1	4	5	James Guy	England	1:45.69	Q
2	4	4	Sam Short	Australia	1:45.90	Q
3	5	3	Harrison Turner	Australia	1:46.08	Q
4	6	4	Matt Richards	Wales	1:46.50	Q
5	6	5	Jack McMillan	Northern Ireland	1:46.72	Q
6	6	3	Lewis Clareburt	New Zealand	1:46.92	Q
7	5	5	Kai Taylor	Australia	1:47.23	Q
8	6	2	Thomas Dean	England	1:47.46	Q
9	5	6	Tyler Melbourne-Smith	Wales	1:47.61	R
10	5	4	Duncan Scott	Scotland	1:47.83	R
11	4	3	Gabriel Shepherd	England	1:48.99	
12	4	2	Kieran Bird	Wales	1:49.18	
13	6	6	Evan Jones	Scotland	1:49.19	
14	6	7	Antoine Sauve	Canada	1:49.24	
15	5	7	Lorne Wigginton	Canada	1:49.48	
16	5	2	Kris Mihaylov	South Africa	1:50.01	
17	1	5	Arvin Singh Chahal	Malaysia	1:51.21	
18	5	1	Aneesh Sunil Kumar Gowda	India	1:51.64	
19	1	2	Yin Chuen Lim	Malaysia	1:51.76	
20	4	1	Sajan Prakash	India	1:51.99	
21	4	6	Charlie Hutchison	Scotland	1:52.20	
22	6	8	Oliver Durand	Namibia	1:52.53	
23	5	8	Samuel Sterry	Jersey	1:53.15	
24	2	4	Luke Beukes	Namibia	1:54.51	
25	3	3	Ethan Stubbs-Green	Antigua and Barbuda	1:55.32	
26	2	8	Muhammad Durrani	Pakistan	1:55.98	
27	3	6	Collins Saliboko	Tanzania	1:56.20	
28	3	7	Jose Canjulo	Namibia	1:56.35	
29	3	1	Elijah Bain	Cayman Islands	1:59.25	
30	4	8	Matthew Deffains	Jersey	1:59.47	
31	2	7	Oscar Dodds	Jersey	2:00.06	
32	2	5	Henry Bolton	Guernsey	2:00.90	
33	4	7	Guy Brooks	South Africa	2:01.94	
34	2	3	Zachary Maiden	Guernsey	2:03.22	
35	1	6	Clinton Opute	Nigeria	2:03.35	
36	2	1	William Caswell	Saint Helena	2:09.21	
37	2	2	Adam Burns	Gibraltar	2:10.13	
38	2	6	Murenzi Sheja	Rwanda	2:11.02	
39	1	4	Christian Chang-Chipolina	Gibraltar	2:11.95	
40	1	3	Nolan George	Saint Helena	2:21.77	
	3	2	Connor Macdonald	Cayman Islands	DNS	
	3	4	Peter Allen	Isle of Man	DNS	
	3	5	Joel Watterson	Isle of Man	DNS	
	3	8	Magnus Kelly	Isle of Man	DNS	
	6	1	James Allison	Cayman Islands	DNS	

=== Final ===
The final took place during of the evening of 29 July 2026.

Heat results
Rank	Lane	Swimmer	Nation	Time	Notes
1st place, gold medalist(s)	1	Kai Taylor	Australia	1:45.22	
2nd place, silver medalist(s)	4	James Guy	England	1:45.72	
2nd place, silver medalist(s)	6	Matt Richards	Wales	1:45.72	
4	3	Harrison Turner	Australia	1:45.93	
5	5	Sam Short	Australia	1:45.94	
6	2	Jack McMillan	Northern Ireland	1:46.29	
7	7	Lewis Clareburt	New Zealand	1:46.40	
8	8	Thomas Dean	England	1:46.86	
