= 2024 Aquatics GB Swimming Championships =

British swimming event

- Venue: London Aquatics Centre
- Location: London
- Start date: 3 April
- End date: 8 April

The 2024 Aquatics GB Swimming Championships (sponsored by Speedo) were held at the London Aquatics Centre in London, from 3 April to 8 April 2024. They also doubled as the trials for the 2024 Summer Olympics. They were organised by Aquatics GB, formerly British Swimming and was the first time the event had been held under the new name.

The championships did not include the non-Olympic 50 metre sprint events (but included Olympic 50 metre freestyles), and also fully integrated the British Para Swimming Championships in mixed classifications for the first times, with para-swimmers seeking nomination times for the Paralympic Games, although there are no automatic or guaranteed berths.

== Medal winners ==
Auto-qualified for 2024 Summer Olympics
Met British Consideration time
Auto-qualified for 2024 Summer Olympics as a relay swimmer
Selected for 2024 Summer Olympics

Locations refer to swimming clubs or performance centres.

- NR: national record
- NAGR^{ux}: national age-group record in the specified age range

=== Men's events ===
| Event | Gold | | Silver | | Bronze | |
|---|---|---|---|---|---|---|
| 50 m freestyle | Ben Proud; Bath U | 21.25 | Matthew Richards; Millfield | 21.83 | Alexander Cohoon; Loughborough U | 21.90 |
| 100 m freestyle | Matthew Richards; Millfield | 47.84 | Duncan Scott; Stirling U | 47.92 | Tom Dean; Bath | 47.94 |
| 200 m freestyle | Matthew Richards; Millfield | 1:44.69 | Duncan Scott; Stirling U | 1:44.75 | Tom Dean; Bath | 1:45.09 |
| 400 m freestyle | Kieran Bird; Bath | 3:45.63 | Luke Turley; Bath | 3:48.93 | Tyler Melbourne-Smith; Loughborough | 3:50.45 |
| 800 m freestyle | Tobias Robinson; Loughborough U | 7:51.51 | Tyler Melbourne-Smith; Loughborough | 7:59.89 | Reece Grady; Stockport | 7:59.71 |
| 1500 m freestyle | Daniel Jervis; Swansea U | 14:47.94 | Tobias Robinson; Loughborough U | 14:54.75 | Alexander Sargeant; Millfield | 15.19.84 |
| 100 m backstroke | Oliver Morgan; Birmingham | 52.70 NR | Jonathon Marshall; Carnegie | 53.03 | Luke Greenbank; Loughborough | 53.82 |
| 200 m backstroke | Oliver Morgan; Birmingham | 1:56.27 | Luke Greenbank; Carnegie | 1:56.39 | Brodie Williams; Bath | 1:57.02 |
| 100 m breaststroke | Adam Peaty; Loughborough | 57.94 | James Wilby; Loughborough | 59.47 | Archie Goodburn; Edinburgh University | 1:00.03 |
| 200 m breaststroke | James Wilby; Loughborough | 2:10.03 | Greg Butler; Loughborough | 2:10.48 | George Smith; Stirling U | 2:12.79 |
| 100 m butterfly | Joe Litchfield; Loughborough | 51.71 | Joshua Gammon; Bath | 51.82 | Jacob Peters; Bath | 51.88 |
| 200 m butterfly | Joshua Gammon; Bath | 1:56.94 | Thomas Beeley; Aberdeen | 1:59.65 | Henry Gray; Chelsea & West | 2:00.97 |
| 200 m individual medley | Duncan Scott; Stirling U | 1:55.91 | Tom Dean; Bath | 1:56.44 | Max Litchfield; Loughborough | 1:58.11 |
| 400 m individual medley | Max Litchfield; Loughborough | 4:09.14 NR | Charlie Hutchison; Loughborough | 4:15.72 | George Smith; Stirling U | 4:17.31 |

=== Women's events ===
Locations refer to swimming clubs or performance centres.

| Event | Gold | | Silver | | Bronze | |
|---|---|---|---|---|---|---|
| 50 m freestyle | Holly Cameron; Sterling | 24.54 | Eva Okaro; Repton | 24.96 | Isabella Hindley; Loughborough | 25.25 |
| 100 m freestyle | Anna Hopkin; Loughborough | 53.33 | Eva Okaro; Repton | 54.46 | Freya Anderson; Repton | 54.59 |
| 200 m freestyle | Freya Colbert; Loughborough | 1:56.22 | Abbie Wood; Loughborough | 1:56.62 | Medi Harris; Loughborough | 1:58.10 |
| 400 m freestyle | Holly Hibbott; Bath | 4:11.67 | Amelie Blocksidge; Salford | 4:12.09; NAGR^{u14} | Fleur Lewis; Loughborough | 4:14.10 |
| 800 m freestyle | Amelie Blocksidge; Salford | 8:32.61; NAGR^{u14} | Fleur Lewis; Loughborough | 8:36.41 | Michaella Glenister; Stirling | 8:43.00 |
| 1500 m freestyle | Amelie Blocksidge; Salford | 16:13.39 | Fleur Lewis; Loughborough | 16:17.36 | Michaella Glenister; Stirling | 16:40.43 |
| 100 m backstroke | Kathleen Dawson; Stirling U | 59.74 | Lauren Cox; Loughborough | 1:00.15 | Holly Cameron; Sterling | 1:00.58 |
| 200 m backstroke | Honey Osrin; Loughborough | 2:08.37 | Katie Shanahan; Stirling U | 2:08.53 | Holly Cameron; Stirling | 2:09.10 |
| 100 m breaststroke | Angharad Evans; Stirling U | 1:06.54 | Kara Hanlon; Edinburgh U | 1:06.60 | Imogen Clark; Derby | 1:07.37 |
| 200 m breaststroke | Kara Hanlon; Edinburgh | 2:24.59 | Elizabeth Booker; Loughborough | 2:25.75 | Gilian Kay Davey; Loughborough Uni | 2:26.75 |
| 100 m butterfly | Keanna Macinnes; University of Stirling | 57.92 | Lucy Grieve; University of Stirling | 58.31 | Laura Stephens; Loughborough | 58.68 |
| 200 m butterfly | Keanna Macinnes; University of Stirling | 2:07.24 | Laura Stephens; Loughborough | 2:07.37 | Emily Large; Millfield | 2:09.02 |
| 200 m individual medley | Abbie Wood; Loughborough | 2:08.91 | Freya Colbert; Loughborough | 2:10.46 | Katie Shanahan; Stirling U | 2:11.39 |
| 400 m individual medley | Freya Colbert; Loughborough | 4:34.01 | Katie Shanahan; Stirling U | 4:36.67 | Beatrice Varley; Plymouth Leander | 4:46.34 |

== Para swimming Championships ==
Para swimming races have been folded into the Championships as a series of multi-classification events, and these events act as partial qualifiers for the 2024 Summer Paralympics. Unlike the able-bodied events, a different system means no guaranteed places are created, but a swimmer wishing to be considered needs to meet a qualification time known as a 'nomination time', calculated on a points basis within their classification.

The following para-swimmers gained a nomination time in these events:

| Athlete | Classification | Event |
|---|---|---|
| Alice Tai | S8 | 100 Backstroke |
| Alice Tai | S8 | 400 Freestyle |
| Brock Whiston | S8 | 100 Butterfly |
| Brock Whiston | S8 | 400 Freestyle |
| Brock Whiston | SB8 | 100 Breaststroke |
| Brock Whiston | SM8 | 200 Individual Medley |
| Callie-Ann Warrington | S10 | 100 Butterfly |
| Cameron Vearncombe | SM14 | 200 Individual Medley |
| Eliza Humphrey | S11 | 400 Freestyle |
| Ellie Challis | S3 | 50 Backstroke |
| Faye Rogers | S10 | 100 Butterfly |
| Grace Harvey | SB5 | 100 Breaststroke |
| Louise Fiddes | S14 | 200 Freestyle |
| Louise Fiddes | SB14 | 200 Breaststroke |
| Maisie Summers-Newton | SB6 | 100 Breaststroke |
| Maisie Summers-Newton | SM6 | 200 Individual Medley |
| Mark Tompsett | S14 | 100 Backstroke |
| Megan Neave | S14 | 100 Backstroke |
| Olivia Newman-Baronius | S14 | 100 Backstroke |
| Olivia Newman-Baronius | S14 | 100 Butterfly |
| Olivia Newman-Baronius | S14 | 200 Freestyle |
| Olivia Newman-Baronius | SM14 | 200 Individual Medley |
| Poppy Maskill | S14 | 100 Backstroke |
| Poppy Maskill | S14 | 100 Butterfly |
| Poppy Maskill | S14 | 200 Freestyle |
| Poppy Maskill | SM14 | 200 Individual Medley |
| Rebecca Redfern | SB13 | 100 Breaststroke |
| Rhys Darbey | SM14 | 200 Individual Medley |
| Scarlett Humphrey | S11 | 400 Freestyle |
| Stephen Clegg | S12 | 100 Backstroke |
| Stephen Clegg | S12 | 100 Butterfly |
| Susanna Hext | S6 | 200 Freestyle |
| Toni Shaw | S9 | 400 Freestyle |
| Tully Kearney | S5 | 100 Freestyle |
| Tully Kearney | S5 | 200 Freestyle |
| Tully Kearney | S5 | 50 Backstroke |
| William Ellard | S14 | 100 Backstroke |
| William Ellard | S14 | 100 Butterfly |
| William Ellard | SM14 | 200 Individual Medley |

== See also ==
- List of British champions in swimming
