= Swimming at the 2026 Commonwealth Games – Women's 4 × 200 metre freestyle relay =

Women's 4 × 200 metre freestyle relay at the 2026 Commonwealth Games
- Venue: Tollcross International Swimming Centre
- Dates: 27 July
- Competitors: 32 from 8 nations
- Winning time: 7:42.53

Medalists
gold medal	Lani Pallister; Hannah Casey; Inez Miller; Mollie O'Callaghan	Australia
silver medal	Freya Colbert; Abbie Wood; Leah Schlosshan; Freya Anderson	England
bronze medal	Erika Fairweather; Caitlin Deans; Eve Thomas; Milana Tapper	New Zealand

The women's 4 × 200 metre freestyle relay event at the 2026 Commonwealth Games was held on 27 July at the Tollcross International Swimming Centre.

== Schedule ==
The schedule is as follows:

All times are British Summer Time (UTC+1)

Date	Time	Round
Monday 27 July 2026	19:00	Final

== Results ==
=== Final ===
The straight final took place during of the evening of 27 July 2026.

Heat results
Rank	Lane	Nation	Swimmers	Time	Notes
1st place, gold medalist(s)	4	Australia	Lani Pallister (1:55.13); Hannah Casey (1:55.43); Inez Miller (1:55.78); Mollie O'Callaghan (1:56.19)	7:42.53	
2nd place, silver medalist(s)	5	England	Freya Colbert (1:55.98); Abbie Wood (1:58.15); Leah Schlosshan (1:58.22); Freya Anderson (1:57.75)	7:50.10	
3rd place, bronze medalist(s)	3	New Zealand	Erika Fairweather (1:55.92); Caitlin Deans (1:58.12); Eve Thomas (1:59.57); Milana Tapper (1:58.33)	7:51.94	
4	2	Scotland	Megan Barnes (1:59.82); Lucy Hope (2:01.15); Evi Mackie (2:01.34); Evie Davis (2:01.27)	8:03.58	
5	6	Canada	Julie Brousseau (2:02.07); Madison Kryger (2:00.41); Delia Lloyd (2:06.45); Ella Jansen (1:58.14)	8:07.07	
6	1	South Africa	Duné Coetzee (2:00.22); Georgia Nel (2:02.60); Hannah Robertson (2:02.03); Hannah Pearse (2:04.31)	8:09.16	
7	7	Wales	Theodora Taylor (2:00.97); Medi Harris (2:04.40); Alexandra Bastone (2:01.65); Sophie Davies (2:02.36)	8:09.38	
8	8	Cayman Islands	Kyra Rabess (2:06.44); Harper Barrowman (2:07.33); Sierrah Broadbelt (2:12.11); Riley Watson (2:15.96)	8:41.84	
