= 2024 Junior Pan Pacific Swimming Championships =

Long course swimming event

- Host city: Canberra, Australia
- Date: 21–24 August
- Venue: AIS Aquatic Centre
- Events: 35

The 2024 Junior Pan Pacific Swimming Championships were held from 21 to 24 August 2024 at AIS Aquatic Centre in Canberra, Australia.

== Results ==
=== Men ===
Event	Gold		Silver		Bronze	
50 m freestyle	Joshua Conias; Australia	22.70	Quin Seider; United States	22.72	Josh Howat; United States	22.87
100 m freestyle	Kim Young-beom; South Korea	48.66	Laon Kim; Canada Marcus Da Silva; Australia	49.37	Not awarded	
200 m freestyle	Luka Mijatovic; United States	1:48.05	Ethan Ekk; Canada	1:48.76	Marcus Da Silva; Australia	1:49.02
400 m freestyle	Luka Mijatovic; United States	3:49.24	Asaki Nishikawa; Japan	3:51.28	Aiden Hammer; United States	3:52.06
800 m freestyle	Luke Ellis; United States	7:52.40; CR	Kazushi Imafuku; Japan	7:53.99	Kaito Tsujimori; Japan	7:54.50
1500 m freestyle	Kazushi Imafuku; Japan	14:59.97; CR	Luke Ellis; United States	15:00.24	Kaito Tsujimori; Japan	15:15.04
100 m backstroke	Aiden Norman; Canada	54.10	Blake Amlicke; United States	55.16	Jack Morrow; Australia	55.59
200 m backstroke	Aiden Norman; Canada	1:57.67	Gavin Keogh; United States	1:58.19	Ethan Ekk; Canada	1:58.28
100 m breaststroke	Shin Ohashi; Japan	1:01.08	Campbell McKean; United States	1:01.13	Oliver Dawson; Canada	1:01.27
200 m breaststroke	Shin Ohashi; Japan	2:10.88	Josh Bey; United States	2:11.96	Jordan Willis; United States	2:13.45
100 m butterfly	Kim Young-beom; South Korea	52.51	Rowan Cox; United States	52.59	Ulises Cazau; Argentina	52.87
200 m butterfly	Logan Robinson; United States	1:57.27	Riki Abe; Japan	1:57.83	Michitora Kono; Japan	1:58.60
200 m individual medley	Gregg Enoch; United States	2:00.58	Joshua Kerr; Australia	2:01.07	Asaki Nishikawa; Japan	2:01.18
400 m individual medley	Asaki Nishikawa; Japan	4:16.64	Luke Ellis; United States	4:16.84	Gregg Enoch; United States	4:20.46
4×100 m freestyle relay	Australia; Joshua Conias (50.57); Thomas Booth (49.63); Xavier Collins (49.79); Marcus Da Silva (48.55)	3:18.54	United States; Quin Seider (50.10); August Vetsch (50.04); Jason Zhao (48.61); Campbell Mckean (50.22)	3:18.97	Canada; Laon Kim (49.45); Ethan Ekk (50.06); Francis Brennan (50.16); Aiden Norman (49.40)	3:19.07
4×200 m freestyle relay	United States; Luka Mijatovic (1:48.66); Norvin Clontz (1:49.67); Gregg Enoch (1:48.68); Jason Zhao (1:49.11)	7:15.82	Australia; Tex Cross (1:49.55); Xavier Collins (1:50.17); Lucas Fackerell (1:50.20); Marcus Da Silva (1:47.74)	7:17.66	Canada; Ethan Ekk (1:48.68); Laon Kim (1:49.63); Alexander Miao (1:50.14); Aiden Norman (1:49.28)	7:17.73
4×100 m medley relay	United States; Gavin Keogh (54.74); Joe Polyak (1:00.18); Rowan Cox (51.89); Jason Zhao (48.79)	3:35.60; CR	Canada; Aiden Norman (53.73); Oliver Dawson (1:00.77); Nicholas Duncan (53.07); Laon Kim (48.56)	3:36.13	Australia; Jack Morrow (55.34); Nicholas Stoupas (1:02.26); Thomas Pattison (53.52); Marcus Da Silva (48.29)	3:39.41

=== Women ===
Event	Gold		Silver		Bronze	
50 m freestyle	Milla Jansen; Australia	24.76	Rylee Erisman; United States	24.78	Hannah Casey; Australia	25.04
100 m freestyle	Rylee Erisman; United States	53.76; CR	Milla Jansen; Australia	54.18	Hannah Casey; Australia	54.74
200 m freestyle	Inez Miller; Australia	1:57.72	Madi Mintenko; United States	1:58.02	Milla Jansen; Australia	1:58.26
400 m freestyle	Kennedi Dobson; United States	4:09.46	Madi Mintenko; United States	4:10.98	Julia Strojnowska; Canada	4:11.52
800 m freestyle	Kayla Han; United States	8:36.77	Kennedi Dobson; United States	8:39.61	Ella Cosgrove; Canada	8:40.00
1500 m freestyle	Paige Downey; United States	16:24.58	Julia Strojnowska; Canada	16:37.72	Haruka Taka; Japan	16:42.56
100 m backstroke	Leah Shackley; United States	59.46; CR	Charlotte Crush; United States	1:00.19	Madison Kryger; Canada	1:00.69
200 m backstroke	Leah Shackley; United States	2:08.19; CR	Teagan O'Dell; United States	2:08.31	Chiaki Yamaoto; Japan	2:11.22
100 m breaststroke	Kotomi Kato; Japan	1:07.45; CR	Sienna Toohey; Australia	1:08.34	Elle Scott; United States	1:08.59
200 m breaststroke	Kotomi Kato; Japan	2:24.73; CR	Julia Remington; Australia	2:27.53	Addie Robillard; United States	2:30.20
100 m butterfly	Audrey Derivaux; United States	57.99; CR	Charlotte Crush; United States	58.19	Kim Doyeon; South Korea	59.23
200 m butterfly	Audrey Derivaux; United States	2:09.14	Misa Okuzono; Japan	2:10.92	Jessica Cole; Australia	2:11.23
200 m individual medley	Teagan O'Dell; United States	2:11.57	Lilla Bognar; United States	2:11.77	Misuzu Nagaoka; Japan	2:12.31
400 m individual medley	Lilla Bognar; United States	4:40.06	Misuzu Nagaoka; Japan	4:41.57	Shuna Sasaki; Japan	4:43.66
4×100 m freestyle relay	United States; Rylee Erisman (53.75) CR; Erika Pelaez (53.89); Teagan O'Dell (54.50); Madi Mintenko (54.35)	3:36.49; CR	Australia; Milla Jansen (53.81); Hannah Casey (54.84); Lillie Mcpherson (56.32); Inez Miller (54.12)	3:39.09	Canada; Delia Lloyd (55.73); Jenna Walters (55.42); Matea Gigovic (56.05); Reina Liu (55.14)	3:42.34
4×200 m freestyle relay	United States; Kennedi Dobson (1:57.79); Rylee Erisman (1:59.10); Teagan O'Dell (1:58.19); Madi Mintenko (1:58.48)	7:53.56; CR	Canada; Julia Strojnowska (1:59.21); Ella Cosgrove (2:00.42); Mia West (2:01.55); Jenna Walters (2:01.59)	8:02.77	Australia; Milla Jansen (2:01.23); Hannah Casey (2:01.65); Amelia Weber (2:02.06); Inez Miller (1:58.05)	8:02.99
4×100 m medley relay	United States; Leah Shackley (59.05) CR; Elle Scott (1:07.78); Audrey Derivaux (58.37); Rylee Erisman (53.68)	3:58.88; CR	Australia; Inez Miller (1:00.72); Sienna Toohey (1:08.52); Jessica Cole (58.93); Milla Jansen (53.27)	4:01.44	Japan; Chiaki Yamaoto (1:00.89); Kotomi Kato (1:07.48); Chisa Sakamoto (1:00.01); Haruka Yoshinaga (54.80)	4:03.18

=== Mixed ===
Event	Gold		Silver		Bronze	
4×100 m medley relay	United States; Leah Shackley (59.26); Campbell McKean (1:00.35); Rowan Cox (51.88); Rylee Erisman (53.72)	3:45.21; CR	Canada; Aiden Norman (53.86); Oliver Dawson (1:00.22); Leilani Fack (59.83); Delia Lloyd (55.25)	3:49.16	Japan; Chiaki Yamamoto (1:01.10); Shin Ohashi (1:00.52); Chisa Sakamoto (1:00.11); Kazusa Kuroda (49.12)	3:50.85

== Medal table ==
* Host nation (Australia)

Rank	Nation	Gold	Silver	Bronze	Total
1	United States	21	17	6	44
2	Japan	6	5	10	21
3	Australia*	4	8	8	20
4	Canada	2	6	8	16
5	South Korea	2	0	1	3
6	Argentina	0	0	1	1
Totals (6 entries)		35	36	34	105
