= 2025 Aquatics GB Swimming Championships =

British swimming event

- Venue: London Aquatics Centre
- Location: London
- Start date: 15 April
- End date: 22 April

The 2025 Aquatics GB Swimming Championships (sponsored by Speedo) were held at the London Aquatics Centre in London, from 15 April to 22 April 2025. They were organised by Aquatics GB, formerly British Swimming and was the second time the event had been held under the new name.

They also doubled as the trials for the 2025 World Aquatics Championships in Singapore. Swimmers who won their event beneath the Aquatics GB consideration time automatically booked their ticket to Singapore. In addition, aggregated times of the top four swimmers in a relay event could qualify a swimmer via a relay slot. All Olympic medallists also had automatic qualification in their event; in individual events this meant Ben Proud, Matt Richards and Duncan Scott, while the number also included James Guy and Tom Dean in relay events. Adam Peaty was likewise automatically qualified for the 100 metre breaststroke event as an Olympic medalist, but had previously announced his intention not to race in 2025.

== Medal winners ==
Key:Qualification for World Aquatics Championships : qualified for individual event ; : qualified for relay. ; : also selected. ; +preselected

=== Men's events ===
| Event | Gold | | Silver | | Bronze | |
|---|---|---|---|---|---|---|
| 50 m freestyle | Ben Proud^{+} | 21.67 | Jacob Mills | 21.99 | Alexander Painter | 22.01 |
| 100 m freestyle | Matt Richards | 47.92 | Jacob Mills | 48.03 | Tom Dean^{+} | 48.40 |
| 200 m freestyle | James Guy^{+} Duncan Scott^{+} | 1:45.08 | not awarded | | Matt Richards^{+} | 1:45.38 |
| 400 m freestyle | James Guy | 3:46.64 | Tyler Melbourne-Smith | 3:49.38 | Jack McMillan | 3:50.05 |
| 800 m freestyle | Tyler Melbourne-Smith | 7:58.68 | Luke Hornsey | 8:03.11 | Alexander Sargeant | 8:04.28 |
| 1500 m freestyle | Reece Grady | 15:21.54 | Alexander Sargeant | 15:25.47 | Luke Hornsey | 15:26.14 |
| 50 m backstroke | Oliver Morgan | 24.43 | Jonathon Marshall | 24.88 | Cameron Brooker | 25.02 |
| 100 m backstroke | Oliver Morgan | 52.12 NR | Jonathon Marshall | 53.21 | Matthew Ward | 53.52 |
| 200 m backstroke | Oliver Morgan | 1:55.55 | Luke Greenbank | 1:56.20 | Jonathon Marshall | 1:58.31 |
| 50m breaststroke | Max Morgan | 27.69 | Archie Goodburn | 27.76 | Filip Nowacki | 27.87 |
| 100 m breaststroke | Greg Butler | 59:93 | Max Morgan | 1:00.10 | Filip Nowacki | 1:00.28 |
| 200 m breaststroke | Greg Butler | 2:10.17 | Filip Nowacki | 2:11.09 | George Smith | 2:12.67 |
| 50 m butterfly | Ben Proud | 23.21 | Jacob Peters; Joshua Gammon | 23.44 | not awarded | |
| 100 m butterfly | Edward Mildred | 51.80 | Jack Brown | 51.87 | Jacob Peters | 51.91 |
| 200 m butterfly | Duncan Scott | 1:54.89 | Edward Mildred | 1:56.21 | James Guy | 1:59.44 |
| 200 m individual medley | Duncan Scott^{+} | 1:56.44 | Matthew Ward | 1:59.13 | Evan Jones | 1:59.21 |
| 400 m individual medley | Max Litchfield | 4:11.59 | Charlie Hutchison | 4:14.92 | George Smith | 4:18.48 |

=== Women's events ===
| Event | Gold | | Silver | | Bronze | |
|---|---|---|---|---|---|---|
| 50 m freestyle | Eva Okaro | 24.48 | Rebecca Guy | 25.02 | Darcy Revitt; Skye Carter | 25.19 |
| 100 m freestyle | Freya Anderson | 54.09 | Eva Okaro | 54.10 | Freya Colbert | 54.54 |
| 200 m freestyle | Freya Colbert | 1:55.76 | Leah Schlosshan | 1:57.80 | Abbie Wood | 1:57.98 |
| 400 m freestyle | Megan Barnes | 4:12.66 | Amelie Blocksidge | 4:12.78 | Hollie Wilson | 4:13.60 |
| 800 m freestyle | Amelie Blocksidge | 8:37.95 | Fleur Lewis | 8:42.34 | Lucy Fox | 8:47.39 |
| 1500 m freestyle | Amelie Blocksidge | 16:23.54 | Fleur Lewis | 16:33.63 | Leah Crisp | 16:40.00 |
| 50 m backstroke | Lauren Cox | 27.72 | Blythe Kinsman | 27.93 | Kathleen Dawson | 28.48 |
| 100 m backstroke | Katie Shanahan | 1:00.03 | Lauren Cox | 1:00.49 | Holly McGill | 1:00.70 |
| 200 m backstroke | Katie Shanahan | 2:07.91 | Holly McGill | 2:08.20 | Honey Osrin | 2:10.60 |
| 50 m breaststroke | Kara Hanlon | 30.80 | Anna Morgan | 31.28 | Jasmine Carter | 31.40 |
| 100 m breaststroke | Angharad Evans | 1:05.37 NR | Kara Hanlon | 1:06.93 | Anna Morgan | 1:08.39 |
| 200 m breaststroke | Angharad Evans | 2:21.86 | Kara Hanlon | 2:24.07 | Sienna Robinson | 2:29.14 |
| 50 m butterfly | Eva Okaro | 26.19 | Laura Stephens | 26.62 | Ciara Schlosshan | 26.68 |
| 100 m butterfly | Keanna Macinnes | 58.03 | Lucy Grieve | 58.09 | Emily Richards | 58.46 |
| 200 m butterfly | Keanna Macinnes | 2:07.14 | Emily Richards | 2:08.25 | Laura Stephens | 2:09.70 |
| 200 m individual medley | Abbie Wood | 2:08.85 | Katie Shanahan | 2:09.88 | Leah Schlosshan | 2:13.14 |
| 400 m individual medley | Abbie Wood | 4:36.66 | Freya Colbert | 4:36.83 | Amalie Smith | 4:44.34 |

=== Relay qualification ===
Relay events were not held, but the total times of swimmers in relevant events - 100 m freestyle, 200 metre freestyle and 100 metre in each of the three stroke events were aggregate for relay consideration:

| | Men | | | Women | | | Mixed |
|---|---|---|---|---|---|---|---|
| | 4 x 100 m freestyle | 4 x 200 m freestyle | 4 x 100 m medley | 4 x 100 m freestyle | 4 x 200 m freestyle | 4 x 100 m medley | 4 x 100 m medley |
| Relay consideration times | 3:13.04 | 7:06.34 | 3:33.15 | 3:36.40 | 7:51.89 | 3:56.89 | 3:44.10 |
| Swimmers | Matt Richards (47.92); Jacob Mills (48.03); Tom Dean (48.40); Jacob Whittle (48.45) | James Guy; Tom Dean; Matt Richards; Duncan Scott; Jack McMillan | Oliver Morgan (52.12); Greg Butler (59.93); Edward Mildred(51.80); Matt Richards (47.92) | Freya Anderson (54.09 ) Eva Okaro (54.10); Freya Colbert (54.54); Theodora Taylor (54.59) | Freya Colbert (1:55.76); Leah Schlosshan (1: 57.80); Abbie Wood (1:57.98); Lucy Hope (1:59.24) | Katie Shanahan (1:00.03); Angharad Evans (1:05.37); Keanna Macinnes(58.03); Freya Anderson (54.09) | Oliver Morgan (52.12); Katie Shanahan (1:00.03); Greg Butler (59.93); Angharad Evans (1:05.37); Edward Mildred (51.80); Keanna Macinnes (58.03); Matt Richards (47.92); Freya Anderson (54.09) |
| Aggregate time | 3:12.80 Q | Preselected Q | 3:31.77 Q | 3:37.32 | 7:50.78 Q | 3:57.52* | 3:43.44 Q |

- although the combined times did not meet the Aquatics GB standard, all would-be members of the team qualified by other routes, and the team had the World Aquatics qualification time; the team was therefore added to the schedule for Sinpapore. In addition, a team was entered in the non-Olympic relay event of the mixed 4 x 100 metres freestyle.

== See also ==
- List of British champions in swimming
