= British swimming champions – 1500 metres freestyle winners =

British swimming event

The British swimming champions over 1500 metres freestyle, formerly the (Amateur Swimming Association (ASA) National Championships) are listed below.

The event was originally contested over the mile and then 1,650 yards and then switched to the metric conversion of 1,500 metres in 1971. Throughout much of the history of the event it was contested by men only because the women competed in the 800 metres freestyle but more recently both events are now contested by both sexes.

The most successful male and female competitors in the history of the event are Graeme Smith with seven titles, and Amelie Blocksidge with three. Daniel Jervis has won the most consecutive titles, six from 2018 to 2024. The current champions (2025) are Reece Grady and Amelie Blocksidge.

== 1,500 metres freestyle champions ==
Year	Men's champion	Women's champion
	Mile	Mile
1961	Richard Campion	not contested
1962	Richard Campion	not contested
1963	John Martin-Dye	not contested
1964	Geoff Grylls	not contested
	1,650 yards	1,650 yards
1965	Sandy Gilchrist	not contested
1966	Alan Kimber	not contested
1967	Alan Kimber	not contested
1968	Alan Kimber	not contested
1969	Ron Jacks	not contested
1970	Mark Treffers	not contested
	1,500 metres	1,500 metres
1971	John Mills	not contested
1972	Brian Brinkley	not contested
1973	Jim Carter	not contested
1974	Jim Carter	not contested
1975	David Parker	not contested
1976	David Parker	not contested
1977	Paul Sparkes	not contested
1978	Simon Gray	not contested
1979		
1980	Andrew Astbury	not contested
1981	Andrew Astbury	not contested
1982	Andrew Astbury	not contested
1983	Andrew Astbury	not contested
1984	Tony Day	not contested
1985	David Stacey	not contested
1986	David Stacey	not contested
1987	Kevin Boyd	not contested
1988	Tony Day	not contested
1989	Kevin Boyd	not contested
1990	Ian Wilson	not contested
1991	Ian Wilson	not contested
1992	Ian Wilson	not contested
1993	Graeme Smith	not contested
1994	Ian Wilson	not contested
1995	Ian Wilson	not contested
1996	Ian Wilson	not contested
1997	Graeme Smith	not contested
1998	Graeme Smith	not contested
1999	Graeme Smith	not contested
2000	Paul Palmer	not contested
2001	Graeme Smith	Rebecca Cooke
2002	Graeme Smith	not contested
2003	Graeme Smith	Rebecca Cooke
2004	David Davies	not contested
2005	David Davies	not contested
2006	David Davies	not contested
2007	Christopher Alderton	Aynsley Heseltine
2008	Richard Charlesworth	not contested
2009	David Davies	not contested
2010	Daniel Fogg	not contested
2011	David Davies	Keri-Anne Payne
2012	Daniel Fogg	not contested
2013	Daniel Fogg	Jazmin Carlin
2014	Daniel Fogg	not contested
2015	Stephen Milne	Danielle Huskisson
2016	Timothy Shuttleworth	not contested
2017	Daniel Jervis	Danielle Huskisson
2018	Daniel Jervis	Mireia Belmonte
2019	Daniel Jervis	Leah Crisp
Not held during 2020 and 2021 due to the COVID-19 pandemic
2022	Daniel Jervis	Fleur Lewis
2023	Daniel Jervis	Amelie Blocksidge
2024	Daniel Jervis	Amelie Blocksidge
2025	Reece Grady	Amelie Blocksidge
2026	Reece Grady	Amelie Blocksidge

== See also ==
- Aquatics GB
- List of British Swimming champions
