= British swimming champions – 800 metres freestyle winners =

British swimming event

The British swimming champions over 800 metres freestyle, formerly the (Amateur Swimming Association (ASA) National Championships) are listed below.

The event was originally contested over 880 yards and then switched to the metric conversion of 800 metres in 1971. Throughout much of the history of the event it was contested by women only because the men competed in the 1,500 metres freestyle.

The most successful male and female competitors in the history of the event are Alan Kimber and Daniel Jervis with three titles each, and Rebecca Adlington and Rebecca Cooke with six titles each. Cooke has won the most consecutive titles, all six coming between 2000 and 2004.

== 800 metres freestyle champions ==
Year	Men's champion	Women's champion
	880 yards	880 yards
1964	Geoff Grylls	not contested
1965	Geoff Grylls	not contested
1966	Alan Kimber	Jeanette Cave
1967	Alan Kimber	Susan Williams
1968	Alan Kimber	Sally Davison
1969	Ron Jacks	Susan Williams
1970	Mark Treffers	Judith Wright
	800 metres	800 metres
1971	not contested	June Green
1972	not contested	June Green
1973	not contested	June Green
1974	not contested	Leslie Cliff
1975	not contested	Diane Walker
1976	not contested	Ann Nelson
1977	not contested	Lindsay Heggie
1978	not contested	Sharron Davies
1979	not contested	
1980	not contested	Jackie Willmott
1981	not contested	Jackie Willmott
1982	not contested	Jackie Willmott
1983	not contested	Jackie Willmott
1984	not contested	Sarah Hardcastle
1985	not contested	Karen Mellor
1986	not contested	Sarah Hardcastle
1987	not contested	Karen Mellor
1988	not contested	Karen Mellor
1989	not contested	Karen Mellor
1990	not contested	Karen Mellor
1991	not contested	Samantha Foggo
1992	not contested	Elizabeth Arnold
1993	not contested	Sarah Hardcastle
1994	not contested	Sarah Collings
1995	not contested	Sarah Hardcastle
1996	not contested	Sarah Collings
1997	not contested	Helen Billington
1998	not contested	Sarah Collings
1999	not contested	Sarah Collings
2000	not contested	Rebecca Cooke
2001	Adam Faulkner	Rebecca Cooke
2002	not contested	Rebecca Cooke
2003	Graeme Smith	Rebecca Cooke
2004	not contested	Rebecca Cooke
2005	not contested	Rebecca Cooke
2006	not contested	Rebecca Adlington
2007	Allen Lindenberg	Cassandra Patten
2008	not contested	Rebecca Adlington
2009	not contested	Rebecca Adlington
2010	not contested	Rebecca Adlington
2011	Tom Allen	Rebecca Adlington
2012	not contested	Rebecca Adlington
2013	Daniel Fogg	Jazmin Carlin
2014	not contested	Jazmin Carlin
2015	Jay Lelliott	Jazmin Carlin
2016	not contested	Jazmin Carlin
2017	Daniel Jervis	Jazmin Carlin
2018	Jay Lelliott	Mireia Belmonte
2019	Samuel Budd	Leah Crisp
Not held during 2020 and 2021 due to the COVID-19 pandemic
2022	Daniel Jervis	Leah Crisp
2023	Daniel Jervis	Freya Colbert
2024	Tobias Robertson	Amelie Blocksidge
2025	Tyler Melbourne-Smith	Amelie Blocksidge
2026	Reece Grady	Amelie Blocksidge

== See also ==
- Aquatics GB
- List of British Swimming champions
