= Honey Osrin =

British swimmer

Personal information
- Nationality: British (English)
- Born: 24 February 2003 (age 23) South Africa

Sport
- Sport: Swimming
- Event: Backstroke
- University team: Loughborough
- Club: Loughborough
Medal record
Women's swimming
Representing United Kingdom
European U23 Championships
Gold medal – first place	2025 Samorin	200 m backstroke
European Junior Championships
Silver medal – second place	2019 Kazan	200 m backstroke
Silver medal – second place	2019 Kazan	4x200 m freestyle

Honey Osrin (born 24 February 2003 in South Africa) is a British swimmer who competed in swimming at the 2024 Summer Olympics.

== Early life ==
Osrin was born in South Africa, moving to Plymouth at the age of 13. She attended Plymouth College.

== Career ==
Osrin studied at Loughborough University.

In 2024, she won the 200 metres backstroke title at the 2024 Aquatics GB Swimming Championships and after setting a time of 2.08.37 she qualified for the British team for the 2024 Summer Olympics. She qualified for the backstroke final with the third fastest time, and finished fifth in the final itself.

In 2025, Osirin finished third behind Katie Shanahan in the 200 metres backstroke at the 2025 Aquatics GB Swimming Championships, missing out on a place for the 2025 World Aquatics Championships in Singapore.
