= 2026 Junior Pan Pacific Swimming Championships =

Swimming championships held in Vancouver in 2026

- Host city: Vancouver, Canada
- Date: 17–20 August
- Venue: UBC Aquatic Centre
- Events: 41

The 2026 Junior Pan Pacific Swimming Championships were held from 17 to 20 August 2026 at UBC Aquatic Centre in Vancouver, Canada.

== Results ==
=== Men ===
Event	Gold		Silver		Bronze	
50 m freestyle	Celso Luis Santos; Brazil	22.48	Christopher Montana; Australia	22.54	Jake Lloyd; United States	22.55
100 m freestyle	Luka Mijatovic; United States	49.53	Matias Chaillou; Argentina	49.56	Jordan Ragland; United States	49.65
200 m freestyle	Luka Mijatovic; United States	1:46.04 CR	Eita Kawaura; Japan	1:47.95	Kai Joyner; United States	1:48.38
400 m freestyle	Luka Mijatovic; United States	3:43.67 CR	Lincoln Wearing; Australia	3:47.85	Raito Numata; Japan	3:48.55
800 m freestyle	Luka Mijatovic; United States	7:44.52 CR	Lincoln Wearing; Australia	7:52.04	Lke Higs; Australia	7:52.29
1500 m freestyle	Luka Mijatovic; United States	14:57.45 CR	Lincoln Wearing; Australia	15:03.47	Luke Higgs; Australia	15:11.23
50 m backstroke	Toya Hirata; Japan	25.16 CR	Davi Vallim Costa De Carvalho; Brazil	25.49	Lucas Bell; New Zealand Tedd Windsor Chan; Singapore	25.66
100 m backstroke	Toya Hirata; Japan	54.43	Ariel Muchirahondo; New Zealand	54.63	Davi Vallhim Costa De Carvalho; Brazil	54.84
200 m backstroke	Davis Jackson; United States	1:59.21	David Sammons; United States	1:59.59	Rui Yoshida; Japan	2:00.54
50 m breaststroke	Yusei Imaizumi; Japan	27.55 CR	Kauã Santos Carvalho; Brazil	27.74	Ian Call; United States	27.77
100 m breaststroke	Yusei Imaizumi; Japan	59.98	Wilson York; United States	1:00.65	Kaua Santos Carvalho; Brazil	1:00.87
200 m breaststroke	Iori Miyazaki; Japan	2:10.10	Wilson York; United States	2:10.15	Rio Omori; Japan	2:13.47
50 m butterfly	Michika Enomoto; Japan	24.13	Issa Kawai; Japan	24.19	Celso Luis Santos; Brazil	24.21
100 m butterfly	Michika Enomoto; Japan	52.46	Charlie Cancelmo; United States	52.69	Mike Rice; United States	53.15
200 m butterfly	Ewan Dalrymple; United States	1:56.41	David Sammons; United States	1:57.95	Ayumu Negishi; Japan	1:58.67
200 m individual medley	Raito Numata; Japan	1:59.31	Zheng Yi; United States	2:00.45	Haru Hirayama; Japan	2:00.49
400 m individual medley	Raito Numata; Japan	4:09.82 CR	Zheng Yi; United States	4:14.94	Ayumu Negiushi; Japan	4:15.44
4×100 m freestyle relay	United States; Mike Rice (49.54); Jordan Ragland (49.49); Ty Thomas (49.95); Luka Mijatovic (49.47)	3:18.45	Australia; Christopher Montana (49.95); Cashy Luo (50.31); Tristen Waugh (49.84); Maxwell Cunningham (49.34)	3:19.44	Japan; Toya Hirata (49.78); Eita Kawaura (50.26); Hinata Ando (50.37); Raito Numata (49.50)	3:19.91
4×200 m freestyle relay	United States; Kai Joyner (1:48.99); Trent Allen (1:49.18); Ellis Crisci (1:49.61); Luka Mijatovic (1:45.44)	7:13.22	Japan; Eita Kawaura (1:49.08); Ryo Furue (1:49.08); Raito Numata (1:47.82); Hinata Ando (1:49.64)	7:15.62	Canada; Simon Fonseca Florez (1:49.20); Adrian Cheung (1:50.51); Eitan Issakov (1:49.65); Gabriel Ardeleanu (1:51.97)	7:21.33
4×100 m medley relay	Japan; Toya Hirata (54.59); Yusei Imaizumi (59.54); Michika Enomoto (51.47); Eita Kawaura (49.54)	3:35.14 CR	United States; Davis Jackson (55.13); Wilson York (1:00.42); Charlie Cancelmo (52.94); Mike Rice (49.31)	3:37.80	Brazil; Davi Valli Costa de Carvalho (55.07); Kauã Santos Carvalho (1:00.76); Alex Muller Anorim (53.99); Celso Luis Santos (49.15)	3:38.97

=== Women ===
Event	Gold		Silver		Bronze	
50 m freestyle	Gabi Brito; United States	25.33	Kate McKinnon; United States	25.39	Hina Nakamura; Japan	25.43
100 m freestyle	Ranumi Eashwarage; Canada	55.00	Aria Grossenbach; United States	55.07	Abi Burke; United States	55.19
200 m freestyle	Abi Burke; United States	1:58.34	Jodie Mead; Australia	1:59.95	Haruno Tanimoto; Japan	2:00.15
400 m freestyle	Vivienne Zangaro; United States	4:09.81	Haruno Tanimoto; Japan	4:09.92	Zayda Miehl; United States	4:13.46
800 m freestyle	Haruno Tanimoto; Japan	8:29.88	Zayda Miehl; United States	8:30.07	Ava Hogan; Australia	8:38.66
1500 m freestyle	Zayda Miehl; United States	16:08.91	Ava Hogan; Australia	16:25.16	Paige Downey; United States	16:26.53
50 m backstroke	Alyssa Sagle; United States	28.54 CR	Lucy Wiens; Canada	28.86	Cecilia Dieleke; Argentina	28.87
100 m backstroke	Lane Francis; United States	1:00.47	Alyssa Sagle; United States	1:00.83	Heidi Shumack; Australia	1:00.90
200 m backstroke	Audrey Derivaux; United States	2:10.35	Lane Francis; United States	2:11.78	Cecilia Dieleke; Argentina	2:12.12
50 m breaststroke	Maddie Moreth; United States	31.58 CR	Lilla Ribot-de-Bresac; Australia Brielle Dredge; Australia	31.63	Not awarded	
100 m breaststroke	Lilla Ribot De Bresac; Australia	1:07.17 CR	Mana Ishikawa; Japan	1:07.79	Mikayla Tan; Singapore	1:08.18
200 m breaststroke	Amelie Smith; Australia	2:24.71 CR	Mana Ishikawa; Japan	2:25.11	Lilla Ribot De Bresac; Australia	2:26.08
50 m butterfly	Gabi Brito; United States	26.51	Olivia Hine; Australia	26.62	Kennedi Southern; United States	26.87
100 m butterfly	Gabi Brito; United States	59.41	Umi Ishizuka; Japan	59.59	Zara Kocak; United States	59.73
200 m butterfly	Umi Ishizuka; Japan	2:08.42	Audrey Derivaux; United States	2:09.37	Ellie Clark; United States	2:11.65
200 m individual medley	Audrey Derivaux; United States	2:12.10	Sydney Hardy; United States	2:13.44	Shuna Sasaki; Japan	2:13.91
400 m individual medley	Shuna Sasaki; Japan	4:39.36	Amelie Smith; Australia	4:40.40	Sydney Hardy; United States	4:40.70
4×100 m freestyle relay	United States; Aria Grossenbach (55.43); Kate McKinnon (55.04); Gabi Brito (55.37); Abi Burke (54.75)	3:40.59	Australia; Kira Long (55.66); Asha Ring (55.24); Lillie McPherson (55.31); Jodie Mead (54.80)	3:41.01	Canada; Ranumi Eashwarage (55.33); Kelly Choi (55.69); Marlee Winser (56.03); Kaede Taka (55.44)	3:42.49
4×200 m freestyle relay	United States; Vivienne Zangaro (2:00.70); Abi Burke (1:58.91); Ellie Clarke (2:00.65); Sydney Hardy (2:00.78)	8:01.04	Australia; Asha Ring (2:02.10); Lillie Mcpherson (2:01.43); Anouk Potter (2:00.98); Jodie Mead (2:00.58)	8:05.09	Japan; Jun Fujiwara (2:01.63); Mimi Gonda (2:04.28); Ruka Yamazaki (2:00.73); Haruno Tanimoto (1:58.95)	8:05.59
4×100 m medley relay	United States; Lane Francis (1:00.51); Maddie Moreth (1:08.05); Audrey Derivaux (59.25); Abi Burke (54.71)	4:02.52	Japan; Misaki Kahshara (1:02.04); Mana Ishikawa (1:07.20); Umi Ishizuka (59.26); Hina Nakamura (54.81)	4:03.31	Australia; Heidi Shumack (1:01.88); Lilla Ribot-de-Bresac (1:07.57); Olivia Hine (59.45); Jodie Mead (55.29)	4:04.19

=== Mixed ===
Event	Gold		Silver		Bronze	
4×100 m medley relay	Japan; Misaki Kasahara (1:01.95); Yusei Imaizumi (59.32); Michika Enomoto (52.23); Hina Nakamura (54.95)	3:48.45	United States; Davis Jackson (54.85); Ian Call (1:01.31); Audrey Derivaux (58.37); Gabi Brito (55.14)	3:49.67	Australia; Heidi Shumack (1:01.33); Leny Grigor (1:01.39); Maxell Cunningham (54.02); Kira Long (54.85)	3:51.59

== Medal table ==
* Host nation (Canada)

Rank	Nation	Gold	Silver	Bronze	Total
1	United States	23	16	12	51
2	Japan	14	8	11	33
3	Australia	2	13	7	22
4	Brazil	1	2	4	7
5	Canada*	1	1	2	4
6	Argentina	0	1	2	3
7	New Zealand	0	1	1	2
8	Singapore	0	0	2	2
Totals (8 entries)		41	42	41	124
