= Mana Ishikawa =

Japanese swimmer (born 2009)

Personal information
- Native name: 石川 真菜
- Nationality: Japanese
- Born: 3 March 2009 (age 17)

Sport
- Sport: Swimming
- Strokes: Breaststroke
Medal record
Women's swimming
Representing Japan
Asian Championships
| Gold medal – first place | 2025 Ahmedabad | 200 m breaststroke |
| Gold medal – first place | 2025 Ahmedabad | 200 m medley |
| Silver medal – second place | 2025 Ahmedabad | 4×100 m medley |
| Silver medal – second place | 2025 Ahmedabad | 4×100 m mixed medley |
Junior Pan Pacific Championships
| Silver medal – second place | 2026 Vancouver | 100 m breaststroke |
| Silver medal – second place | 2026 Vancouver | 200 m breaststroke |
| Silver medal – second place | 2026 Vancouver | 4×100 m medley |
Youth Olympic Games
| Gold medal – first place | 2026 Dakar | 50 m breaststroke |
| Gold medal – first place | 2026 Dakar | 100 m breaststroke |
| Gold medal – first place | 2026 Dakar | 200 m breaststroke |
| Gold medal – first place | 2026 Dakar | 200 m medley |

Mana Ishikawa (Japanese: 石川 真菜, born 3 March 2009) is a Japanese swimmer.

== Career ==
In August 2026, Ishikawa competed at the 2026 Junior Pan Pacific Swimming Championships and won silver medals in the 100 metre breaststroke, 200 metre breaststroke and 4×100 metre medley relay. In November 2026, she represented Japan at the 2026 Summer Youth Olympics and won a gold medal in the 200 metre breaststroke event with a time of 2:26.50. This was Japan's first gold medal of the 2026 Summer Youth Olympics. The next day she won a gold medal in 100 metre breaststroke with a time of 1:08.81. She then won a gold medal in the 200 metre individual medley with a time of 2:13.06.
