= British swimming champions – 50 metres freestyle winners =

British swimming event

The British swimming champions over 50 metres freestyle winners are listed below.

The event first appeared at the 1984 Championships. Mark Foster, with 14 wins, and Francesca Halsall with eleven are the most successful male and female swimmers in the event, with Hansell's nne-in-a-row a record for consecutive titles. The reigning men's and women's champions (2025) are Ben Proud (his seventh) and Eva Okaro (her first) respectively.

== 50 metres freestyle champions ==
Year	Men's champion	Women's champion
1984	David Lowe	Nicola Fibbens
1985	Mark Reynolds	Alyson Jones
1986	Mark Foster	Nicola Fibbens
1987	Mark Foster	Nicola Kennedy
1988	Mark Foster	(Netherlands) Conny van Bentum
1989	Mike Fibbens	Caroline Woodcock
1990	(New Zealand) Nicholas Sanders	Caroline Woodcock
1991	Mike Fibbens	Alison Sheppard
1992	Mark Foster	Karen Pickering
1993	Mike Fibbens	Karen Pickering
1994	Mike Fibbens	Sue Rolph
1995	Mark Foster	Sue Rolph
1996	Nicholas Osborn	Rosalind Brett
1997	Mark Foster	Sue Rolph
1998	Mark Foster	Sue Rolph
1999	Mark Foster	Alison Sheppard
2000	Mark Foster	Alison Sheppard
2001	Mark Foster	Alison Sheppard
2002	Mark Foster	Alison Sheppard
2003	Mark Foster	Alison Sheppard
2004	Mark Foster	Alison Sheppard
2005	Matthew Tutty	Francesca Halsall
2006	Matthew Tutty	Francesca Halsall
2007	Matthew Tutty	Georgina Heyn
2008	Mark Foster	Francesca Halsall
2009	Adam Brown	Francesca Halsall
2010	Simon Burnett	Francesca Halsall
2011	Adam Brown	Francesca Halsall
2012	Adam Brown	Francesca Halsall
2013	Adam Brown	Francesca Halsall
2014	Adam Brown	Francesca Halsall
2015	Ben Proud	Francesca Halsall
2016	Ben Proud	Francesca Halsall
2017	Ben Proud	Anna Hopkin
2018	David Cumberlidge	(Spain) Lidón Muñoz
2019	Ben Proud	Anna Hopkin
Not held during 2020 and 2021 due to the COVID-19 pandemic
2022	Lewis Burras	Anna Hopkin
2023	Ben Proud	Anna Hopkin
2024	Ben Proud	Anna Hopkin
2025	Ben Proud	Eva Okaro
2026	Jacob Mills	Eva Okaro

== See also ==
- Aquatics GB
- List of British Swimming champions
