= David Stacey =

British swimmer (born 1965)

Personal information
- Born: 22 February 1965 (age 61) High Wycombe, Buckinghamshire, England

Sport
- Sport: Swimming

David Stacey (born 22 February 1965) is a British swimmer.

== Swimming career ==
Stacey competed in the men's 1500 metre freestyle at the 1984 Summer Olympics. He represented England in the 400 metres and 1500 metres freestyle events, at the 1982 Commonwealth Games in Brisbane, Queensland, Australia. Four years later he represented England in the same events, at the 1986 Commonwealth Games in Edinburgh, Scotland. He also won the 1985 and 1986 ASA National Championship title in the 1500 metres freestyle event.
