= Swimming at the 2024 European Aquatics Championships – Women's 1500 metre freestyle =

Women's 1500 metre freestyle at the 2024 European Aquatics Championships
- Venue: Sports Centre Milan Gale Muškatirović
- Dates: 20 June (heats); 21 June (final)
- Competitors: 12 from 7 nations
- Winning time: 16:06.37

Medalists
gold medal	Vivien Jackl	Hungary
silver medal	Celine Rieder	Germany
bronze medal	Fleur Lewis	Great Britain

The Women's 1500 metre freestyle competition of the 2024 European Aquatics Championships was held on 20 and 21 June 2024.

== Records ==
Prior to the competition, the existing world, European and championship records were as follows.

	Name	Nation	Time	Location	Date
World record	Katie Ledecky	United States	15:20.48	Indianapolis	16 May 2018
European record	Lotte Friis	Denmark	15:38.88	Barcelona	30 July 2013
Championship record	Boglárka Kapás	Hungary	15:50.22	London	21 May 2016

== Results ==
=== Heats ===
The heats were started on 20 June at 10:40.
Qualification Rules: The 8 fastest from the heats qualify to the final.

Rank	Heat	Lane	Name	Nationality	Time	Notes
1	2	4	Viktória Mihályvári-Farkas	Hungary	16:21.92	Q
2	2	3	Fleur Lewis	Great Britain	16:35.91	Q
3	1	5	Jeannette Spiwoks	Germany	16:35.99	Q
4	1	4	Celine Rieder	Germany	16:38.15	Q
5	2	5	Vivien Jackl	Hungary	16:44.13	Q
6	1	6	Lucie Hanquet	Belgium	16:45.48	Q
7	1	3	Merve Tuncel	Turkey	16:53.82	Q
8	1	2	Ada Hakkarainen	Finland	16:53.95	Q
9	2	6	Nora Fluck	Hungary	17:00.38	
10	1	7	Leonie-Sarah Tenzer	Finland	17:03.25	
11	2	7	Louna Kasvio	Finland	17:10.91	
12	2	1	Katarina Ćorović	Serbia	18:03.15	
	2	2	Deniz Ertan	Turkey	DNS	

=== Final ===
The final was held on 21 June at 19:59.

Rank	Lane	Name	Nationality	Time	Notes
1st place, gold medalist(s)	2	Vivien Jackl	Hungary	16:06.37	
2nd place, silver medalist(s)	6	Celine Rieder	Germany	16:15.98	
3rd place, bronze medalist(s)	5	Fleur Lewis	Great Britain	16:17.53	
4	4	Viktória Mihályvári-Farkas	Hungary	16:19.83	
5	3	Jeannette Spiwoks	Germany	16:33.57	
6	7	Lucie Hanquet	Belgium	16:52.87	
7	8	Leonie-Sarah Tenzer	Finland	16:58.44	
8	1	Ada Hakkarainen	Finland	17:09.51	
