= Holly McGill =

British swimmer

Personal information
- Nationality: British (Scottish)
- Born: 11 June 2005 (age 21) Edinburgh, Scotland

Sport
- Sport: Swimming
- Event: Backstroke
- University team: University of Stirling
- Club: Heart of Midlothian
Medal record
Representing Great Britain
European Junior Championships
Silver medal – second place	2023 Belgrade	200m backstroke
Representing Scotland
Commonwealth Youth Games
Gold medal – first place	2023 Trinidad	100m backstroke
Gold medal – first place	2023 Trinidad	200m backstroke

Holly McGill (born 11 June 2005) is a swimmer from Scotland.

== Biography ==
McGill was educated at the University of Stirling, where she studied business. She swims for the university having previously swam for Heart of Midlothian.

McGill came to prominence when she was selected for the Scottish team for the 2022 Commonwealth Games in Birmingham. She reached the semi finals of the 100 backstroke and finished fifth in the final of the 200 metres backstroke.

McGill won a silver medal behind Dóra Molnár in the 200 metres backstroke at the 2023 European Junior Swimming Championships in Belgrade. This was quickly followed by double gold at the 2023 Commonwealth Youth Games in the 100 and 200 metres backstroke events. She made her Great Britain senior debut at the 2024 European Aquatics Championships and finished fourth in the 200 backstroke final.

In 2025, McGill was selected for Team GB's world class programme and finished runner-up and third respectively behind Katie Shanahan in 200 and 100 backstroke events at the 2025 Aquatics GB Swimming Championships, which earned selection for the 2025 World Aquatics Championships in Singapore.
