= Swimming at the 2023 Commonwealth Youth Games =

- Venue: National Aquatics Stadium
- Dates: 6–9 August 2023

Swimming at the 2023 Commonwealth Youth Games was held at National Aquatics Stadium, Trinidad from 6 to 9 August 2023. A total of 35 events to be contested.

Maximum 2 athletes will be allowed per individual event while only 1 team will be allowed in relay races.

== Medal table ==
* Host nation (Trinidad and Tobago)

Rank	Nation	Gold	Silver	Bronze	Total
1	England	9	10	4	23
2	Australia	7	6	7	20
3	Scotland	7	3	1	11
4	Trinidad and Tobago*	4	1	1	6
5	Northern Ireland	3	2	2	7
6	Wales	2	3	5	10
7	South Africa	1	2	3	6
8	Cayman Islands	1	1	3	5
9	Malaysia	1	0	0	1
10	New Zealand	0	3	4	7
11	Jersey	0	2	1	3
12	Bahamas	0	1	2	3
13	India	0	1	0	1
14	Barbados	0	0	1	1
14	Fiji	0	0	1	1
Totals (15 entries)		35	35	35	105

== Medalists ==
=== Boys ===
Event	Gold		Silver		Bronze	
50 m freestyle	Nikoli Blackman; Trinidad and Tobago	22.36	Marvin Johnson Jr. Bahamas	22.54	Zarek Wilson; Trinidad and Tobago	22.95
100 m freestyle	Nukoli Blackman; Trinidad and Tobago	49.60	Mathew Ward; Scotland	50.26	Marvin Johnson Jr. Bahamas	50.41
200 m freestyle	Nukoli Blackman; Trinidad and Tobago	1:49.94	James Ellison; Cayman Islands	1:50.97	Harvey Larke; England	1:51.64
400 m freestyle	Tyler Melbourne-Smith; Wales	3:54.19	Reece Grady; England	3:54.74	Harry Wynne-Jones; England	3:56.29
1500 m freestyle	Tyler Melbourne-Smith; Wales	15:30.80	Reece Grady; England	15:31.22	Harry Wynne-Jones; England	15:31.38
50 m backstroke	Mathew Ward; Scotland	25.51	Zarek Wilson; Trinidad and Tobago	26.18	Nigel Forbes; Bahamas	26.32
100 m backstroke	Mathew Ward; Scotland	54.57	Brandon Biss; Northern Ireland	56.29	Adam Graham; England	56.39
200 m backstroke	Matthew Ward; Scotland	1:59.21	Adam Graham; England	2:02.05	Brandon Biss; Northern Ireland	2:03.84
50 m breaststroke	Oscar Bilbao; England	28.60	Filip Nowacki; Jersey	29.08	Caleb Carlisle; New Zealand	29.24
100 m breaststroke	Oscar Bilbao; England	1:03.12	Filip Nowacki; Jersey	1:03.16	Kian Craig Keylock; South Africa	1:03.46
200 m breaststroke	Oscar Bilbao; England	2:15.57	Maxwell Anderson; Wales	2:16.03	Filip Nowascki; Jersey	2:16.20
50 m butterfly	Dean Fearn; Scotland	24.43	Nick Finch; England	24.46	David Young; Fiji	24.48
100 m butterfly	Zarek Wilson; Trinidad and Tobago	53.70	Nick Finch; England	53.95	Jarden Eaton; South Africa	54.41
200 m butterfly	Goh Li Hen; Malaysia	2:03.63	Reuben Rowbatham-Keating; England	2:03.84	Jarden Eaton; South Africa	2:06.07
200 m medley	Matthew Ward; Scotland	2:01.70	Kian Craig Keylock; South Africa	2:03.84	Kevin Zhang; New Zealand	2:04.42
400 m medley	Reece Grady; England	4:25.16	Shoan Ganguly; India	4:25.47	Evan Davidson; Trinidad and Tobago	4:25.58

=== Girls ===
Event	Gold		Silver		Bronze	
50 m freestyle	Skye Carter; England	25.15	Theodora Taylor; Wales	25.54	Inez Miller; Australia	25.59
100 m freestyle	Jillian Crooks; Cayman Islands	55.18 NR	Inez Miller; Australia	55.59	Skye Carter; England	56.21
200 m freestyle	Inez Miller; Australia	2:00.36	Erin Little; England	2:01.58	Mikayla Bird; Australia	2:01.73
400 m freestyle	Inez Miller; Australia	4:14.97	Hannah Allen; Australia	4:18.72	Heidi Stoute; Barbados	4:25.21
800 m freestyle	Hannah Allen; Australia	8:48.66	Hannah Abdou; New Zealand	9:10.56	Harper Barrowman; Cayman Islands	9:11.72
50 m backstroke	Zoe Ammundsen; Australia	28.71	Blythe Kinsman; England	28.73	Jillian Crooks; Cayman Islands	29.51 NR
100 m backstroke	Holly McGill; Scotland	1:01.96	Zoe Ammundsen; Australia	1:01.98	Jillian Crooks; Cayman Islands	1:02.10 NR
200 m backstroke	Holly McGill; Scotland	2:12.06	Zoe Ammundsen; Australia	2:16.42	Hope Chmeil; New Zealand	2:17.78
50 m breaststroke	Sienna Robinson; England	32.09	Simone Moll; South Africa	32.34	Theodora Taylor; Wales	32.60
100 m breaststroke	Sienna Robinson; England	1:10.29	Theodora Taylor; Wales	1:10.39	Ellie McCartney; Northern Ireland	1:10.46
200 m breaststroke	Ellie McCartney; Northern Ireland	2:30.74	Siena Robinson; England	2:31.61	Theodora Taylor; Wales	2:32.91
50 m butterfly	Jessica Leigh Thompson; South Africa	26.84	Amelia Bray; New Zealand	27.00	Mikayla Bird; Australia	27.07
100 m butterfly	Mikayla Bird; Australia	1:00.15	Lillie McPherson; Australia	1:00.80	Amelia Bray; New Zealand	1:01.32
200 m butterfly	Mikayla Bird; Australia	2:12.66	Poppy Stephen; Australia	2:13.34	Ashleigh Baillie; England	2:16.74
200 m medley	Ellie McCartney; Northern Ireland	2:15.65	Grace Davison; Northern Ireland	2:18.75	Theodora Taylor; Wales	2:19.59
400 m medley	Grace Davison; Northern Ireland	4:57.68	Daniel Asiata; New Zealand	4:58.00	Holly Marshall; Wales	5:01.30

=== Mixed ===
Event	Gold		Silver		Bronze	
4×100 m freestyle relay	England (ENG); Reuben Rowbotham-Keating; Nick Finch; Skye Carter; Erin Little	3:33.44	Scotland (SCO); Matthew Ward; Stefan Krawiek; Drew McKenzie; Laurie Devine	3:35.60	Australia (AUS); Jye Bennion; Harvey Larke; Mikayla Bird; Inez Miller	3:36.03
4×200 m freestyle relay	Australia (AUS); Jye Bennion; Harvey Larke; Mikayla Bird; Inez Miller	7:45.74	England (ENG); Harry Wynne-Jones; Reuben Rowbotham-Keating; Ashleigh Baillie; Erin Little	7:51.41	Wales (WAL); Tyler Melbourne-Smith; Solomon Williams; Sophie Davies; Theodora Taylor	7:53.44
4×100 m medley relay	England (ENG); Blythe Kinsman; Oscar Bilbao; Nick Finch; Skye Carter	3:54.02	Scotland (SCO); Matthew Ward; Evan Davidson; Drew McKenzie; Laurie Devine	3:58.03	Australia (AUS); Clancy Luscombe; Samuel Higgs; Mikayla Bird; Inez Miller	3:59.12
