= Swimming at the 2024 European Aquatics Championships – Women's 200 metre backstroke =

Women's 200 metre backstroke at the 2024 European Aquatics Championships
- Venue: Sports Centre Milan Gale Muškatirović
- Dates: 17 June (heats); 18 June (final)
- Competitors: 16 from 13 nations
- Winning time: 2:08.95

Medalists
gold medal	Camila Rebelo	Portugal
silver medal	Dóra Molnár	Hungary
bronze medal	Eszter Szabó-Feltóthy	Hungary

The Women's 200 metre backstroke competition of the 2024 European Aquatics Championships was held on 17 and 18 June 2024.

== Records ==
Prior to the competition, the existing world, European and championship records were as follows.

	Name	Nation	Time	Location	Date
World record	Kaylee McKeown	Australia	2:03.14	Sydney	10 March 2023
European record	Anastasia Zuyeva	Russia	2:04.94	Rome	1 August 2009
Championship record	Margherita Panziera	Italy	2:06.08	Budapest	23 May 2021

== Results ==
=== Heats ===
The heats were started on 17 June at 10:07.
Qualification Rules: The 16 fastest from the heats qualify to semifinals.

=== Semifinals ===
The heats were started on 17 June at 18:55.
Qualification Rules: The 8 fastest from the heats qualify to the final.

Rank	Heat	Lane	Name	Nationality	Time	Notes
1	1	1	Dóra Molnár	Hungary	2:09.67	Q
2	2	4	Eszter Szabó-Feltóthy	Hungary	2:10.21	Q
3	1	2	Adela Piskorska	Poland	2:10.26	Q
4	2	5	Holly McGill	Great Britain	2:10.59	Q
5	2	3	Camila Rebelo	Portugal	2:10.73	Q
6	1	3	Aviv Barzelay	Israel	2:11.38	Q
7	1	4	Aissia-Claudia Prisesariu	Romania	2:11.63	Q
8	1	5	Nika Sharafutdinova	Ukraine	2:11.88	Q
9	2	6	Gabriela Georgieva	Bulgaria	2:12.56	
10	2	2	Tatiana Salcutan	Moldova	2:12.73	
11	2	7	Laura Bernat	Poland	2:13.40	
12	1	6	Justine Murdock	Lithuania	2:14.75	
13	1	7	Lena Grabowski	Austria	2:15.29	
14	2	1	Lottie Cullen	Ireland	2:15.57	
15	1	8	Karoline Sørensen	Denmark	2:17.02	
16	2	8	Tom Mienis	Israel	2:17.39	

=== Final ===
The final was held on 18 June at 18:30.

Rank	Lane	Name	Nationality	Time	Notes
1st place, gold medalist(s)	2	Camila Rebelo	Portugal	2:08.95	NR
2nd place, silver medalist(s)	4	Dóra Molnár	Hungary	2:09.02	
3rd place, bronze medalist(s)	5	Eszter Szabó-Feltóthy	Hungary	2:09.21	
4	6	Holly McGill	Great Britain	2:09.74	
5	7	Aviv Barzelay	Israel	2:10.06	
6	3	Adela Piskorska	Poland	2:10.85	
7	1	Aissia-Claudia Prisesariu	Romania	2:11.00	
8	8	Nika Sharafutdinova	Ukraine	2:13.76	
