= Reece Grady =

British swimmer

Personal information
- Nationality: British (English)
- Born: 12 April 2005 (age 21)

Sport
- Sport: Swimming
- Event: freestyle / medley
- University team: Arizona State University
- Club: Stockport Metro SC
Medal record
Representing Great Britain
British Championships
Gold medal – first place	2026 London	800m freestyle
Gold medal – first place	2026 London	1500m freestyle
Gold medal – first place	2025 London	1500m freestyle
Bronze medal – third place	2024 London	800m freestyle
Representing England
Commonwealth Youth Games
Gold medal – first place	2023 Trinbago	400m medley
Silver medal – second place	2023 Trinbago	400m freestyle
Silver medal – second place	2023 Trinbago	1500m freestyle

Reece Grady (born 12 April 2005) is a swimmer from England who is a British champion and Commonwealth Youth gold medallist.

== Career ==
Grady was educated at King's School, Macclesfield and Arizona State University.

As a Stockport Metro SC member he represented England and won a gold medal and two silvers at the Swimming at the 2023 Commonwealth Youth Games. The gold came in the 400 metres medley and the silver medals came in the 400 metres and 1500 metres freestyle events.

In 2025, Grady became the British champion after winning the 1500 metres freestyle title at the 2025 Aquatics GB Swimming Championships.

In 2026, Grady became a double British champion retaining the 1500 metres freestyle title and also adding the 800 metres freestyle title at the 2026 Aquatics GB Swimming Championships.
