= Luka Mijatovic =

American swimmer (born 2009)

Personal information
- Full name: Luka Mijatovic
- Nationality: United States
- Born: April 22, 2009 (age 17) Pleasanton, California, United States

Sport
- Sport: Swimming
- Strokes: Freestyle
Medal record
Representing United States
Junior Pan Pacific Championships
Gold medal – first place	2024 Canberra	200 m freestyle
Gold medal – first place	2024 Canberra	400 m freestyle
Gold medal – first place	2024 Canberra	4x200 m freestyle
Gold medal – first place	2026 Vancouver	100 m freestyle
Gold medal – first place	2026 Vancouver	200 m freestyle
Gold medal – first place	2026 Vancouver	400 m freestyle
Gold medal – first place	2026 Vancouver	800 m freestyle
Gold medal – first place	2026 Vancouver	1500 m freestyle
Gold medal – first place	2026 Vancouver	4x100 m freestyle
Gold medal – first place	2026 Vancouver	4x200 m freestyle

Luka Mijatovic (born April 22, 2009) is an American swimmer specializing in freestyle. He won five individual gold medals at the 2026 Junior Pan Pacific Swimming Championships, winning every freestyle event from 100 meters to 1500 meters. He also holds national 17-18 age group records in the 400 meters and 800 meters.

At the 2026 USA Swimming Championships, Mijatovic won his first senior national title in the 400 meters, becoming the youngest man to win a national swimming titles since Michael Phelps in 2002.

Considered the top swimming prospect for the high school class of 2027, Mijatovic is committed to swim for the University of Texas.
