= Ian Wilson (swimmer) =

British swimmer

Personal information
- Nationality: English
- Born: 19 December 1970 (age 55) Sunderland, Tyne and Wear

Sport
- Sport: freestyle swimming
- Club: Borough of Sunderland
Medal record
Men's swimming
Representing Great Britain
World Championships (SC)
Silver medal – second place	1995 Rio de Janeiro	1500 m freestyle
European Championships - Long Course
Silver medal – second place	1991 Athens	1500 m freestyle
European Championships - Short Course
Silver medal – second place	1996 Rostock	1500 m freestyle
Summer Universiade
Gold medal – first place	1991 Sheffield	1500 m freestyle

Ian Wilson (born 19 December 1970) is a retired long-distance freestyle swimmer from Great Britain.

== Swimming career ==
He represented his native country at the 1992 Summer Olympics in Barcelona, Spain. There he finished in fifth place in the men's 1500-metre freestyle event. The previous year he won the silver medal at the 1991 European Long Course Championships in the same event.

He represented England in the 400 metres and 1,500 freestyle events, at the 1990 Commonwealth Games in Auckland, New Zealand. Four years later he competed in the 1,500 metres freestyle during the 1994 Commonwealth Games and then took part in a third Games when he swam once again in the 1,500 metres freestyle at the 1998 Commonwealth Games. He also won the ASA National Championship in the 1500 metres freestyle on six occasions (1990, 1991, 1992, 1994, 1995, 1996) and also won the 400 metres freestyle title in 1995 and 1996.
