= Caroline Woodcock =

English swimmer

Personal information
- Nationality: English
- Born: 1973 (age 52–53) Sussex

Sport
- Club: Barnet & Haywards Heath

Caroline Woodcock (born 1973), is a female former swimmer who competed for England.

== Swimming career ==
Woodcock became a National champion after winning the 1989 ASA National Championship in the 50 metres freestyle and successfully defended her title the following year. She represented England in the 50 metres freestyle, at the 1990 Commonwealth Games in Auckland, New Zealand.
