= Inez Miller =

Australian swimmer (born 2006)

Personal information
- Full name: Inez Elizabeth Argyle Miller
- Nationality: Australian
- Born: 8 November 2006 (age 19)

Sport
- Sport: Swimming
- Strokes: Freestyle
- Club: Fenix Swim Club
- College team: University of Texas at Austin
Medal record
Women's swimming
Representing Australia
Commonwealth Games
Gold medal – first place	2026 Glasgow	4×200 m freestyle
Gold medal – first place	2026 Glasgow	4×100 m freestyle
Pan Pacific Championships
Gold medal – first place	2026 Irvine	4×200 m freestyle
Junior Pan Pacific Championships
Gold medal – first place	2024 Canberra	200 m freestyle
Silver medal – second place	2024 Canberra	4×100 m freestyle
Silver medal – second place	2024 Canberra	4×100 m medley
Bronze medal – third place	2024 Canberra	4×200 m freestyle

Inez Elizabeth Argyle Miller (born 8 November 2006) is an Australian swimmer. She currently competes at the collegiate level for the Texas Longhorns.

== Career ==
In June 2026, she competed at the 2026 Australian Swimming Trials and was selected to represent Australia at the 2026 Commonwealth Games and 2026 Pan Pacific Swimming Championships. During the Commonwealth Games she won a gold medal in the 4 × 200 metre freestyle relay on 24 July 2026. On 27 July 2026, she won a gold medal in the 4 × 200 metre freestyle relay. In August 2026, she competed at the Pan Pacific Swimming Championships and won a gold medal in the 4 × 200 metre freestyle relay with a Pan Pacific Championships record time of 7:42.40.

== Personal life ==
Miller's mother, Fiona Argyle, was the mayor of City of Nedlands.
