= Shannon Smith (swimmer) =

Canadian swimmer

Personal information
- Full name: Shannon Smith
- National team: Canada
- Born: September 28, 1961 (age 64) Vancouver, British Columbia
- Height: 1.74 m (5 ft 9 in)
- Weight: 63 kg (139 lb)

Sport
- Sport: Swimming
- Strokes: Freestyle
- Club: Hyack Swim Club, Pacific Coast Swimming
- Coach: Ron Jacks
Medal record
Women's swimming
Representing Canada
Olympic Games
Bronze medal – third place	Montreal 1976	400 m freestyle

Shannon Smith (born September 28, 1961) is a former competition swimmer who represented Canada as a 14-year-old at the 1976 Summer Olympics in Montreal, Quebec where she captured a bronze medal in the 400-meter freestyle. During her stellar career, she captured a total of 34 Canadian open and age group medals, and between 1975-78 was world-ranked in seven events.

== Early life ==
Smith was born September 28, 1961 in Vancouver, British Columbia to Marshall and Pat Smith and attended Lord Byng Secondary. Part of an athletic family, her older sister Tricia Smith by five years, swam at the national level before switching to rowing, and winning a silver medal in coxless pairs at the 1984 Olympics. Shannon began to compete at age 11 with the Canadian Dolphin Swim Club, and with the Byng Swim Club, and may have trained briefly with Ron Jacks' Arbutus Swim Club. At 12, she set five national records and won eight events including the overall title at the British Columbia Winter Age Group Swimming Championships. At 14 she completed a 25 mile round trip twice a day to train with the Hyack Swim Club at the Canada Games Pool in New Westminster under Canadian Hall of Fame Head Coach Ron Jacks. She later swam with Jacks' Pacific Swim Club in Victoria, British Columbia. As a ninth-grader in mid-March 1976 at an international meet hosted by the Canadian Dolphins, she swam the 200-meter freestyle in a Canadian record time of 2:03.426, and the 1500 freestyle with a Canadian record time of 16:47.105, shattering the former record. She bettered her own Canadian record in the 800-meter freestyle with a time of 8:57.29 and broke the Canadian record in the 400-meter freestyle with a time of 4:19.069.

== 1976 Montreal Olympics ==
At the early June, 1976 Canadian Olympic trials in Etobicoke, Ontario, Smith placed second in the 400-meter freestyle final with a time of 4:19.91, edged out of first by a tenth of a second by Wendy Quirk of Quebec who swam a 4:19.81. Smith's mother, Pat Smith, acted as an assistant mission chief for the Canadian Olympic team which might include help with arranging public appearances, interviews, and assuming a small role in helping with administrative matters. Shannon was rated the top in the world prior to the 800-meter freestyle trials that week. As many had expected, Smith placed first in the trial finals for the 800-meter freestyle with a time of 8:49.11, securing a berth with the Canadian team in the event. Some controversy existed as to why Smith's coach Ron Jacks had not been invited as an Assistant coach to the Olympic Canadian team, which was headed by Vancouver's Derek Snelling.

At only 14, Smith won a bronze medal for her third-place performance in the women's 400-metre freestyle at the 1976 Olympics with a time 4:14.60, coming behind East German Petra Thumer (4:09.89) and American Shirley Babashoff (4:10.46). Smith had to fight off a challenge for the bronze medal from Rebecca of New Zealand, who finished only .16 seconds behind her, taking fourth place with a time of 4:14.60. Petra Thumer's gold medal, with a world record time of 4:09.89 was around a half a second ahead of American Shirley Babashoff, but was later tainted by accusations of steroid doping by Babashoff which after 1991 with the unification of East Germany, was found to have authenticity. Smith also competed in the Women's 800-metre freestyle, finishing sixth in the event final and clocking a time of 8:48.15. She led through the first three hundred meters, but Petra Thumer and American Shirley Babashoff soon passed her in a very close race for first and second place. In a close finish, Germany's Thumer finished first for the gold with an 8:37.14, with American Shirley Babashoff taking second for the bronze with a 8:37.59, less than half a second behind.

In 1976, Smith captured the gold medal in the 800-meter freestyle at the US national championships. She broke her own 1500-meter Canadian record with a time 16:35.9 of at the Canadian Dolphin Invitational meet on February 26, 1977. At the Canada Cup competition in Calgary from May 1-3, 1977, Shannon had five first place finishes including her wins in the 400-meter freestyle in 5:06.8, the 100-meter freestyle in 59:83, and the 200-meter Individual Medley in 2:07.02. She placed second in the 200-meter backstroke.

She retired from swimming shortly before the 1978 Commonwealth Games, and competed in cycling and rowing as had her sister Pat, though never reached her prior levels of success.

== Honors ==
In 1983, she was admitted to the British Columbia Sports Hall of Fame.
