= Swimming at the 2026 European Aquatics Championships – Women's 200 metre backstroke =

Women's 200 metre backstroke at the 2026 European Aquatics Championships
- Venue: Paris Aquatic Centre
- Dates: 10 August (heats and semifinals); 11 August (final)
- Competitors: 29 from 19 nations
- Winning time: 2:06.13

Medalists
gold medal	Katie Shanahan	Great Britain
silver medal	Camila Rebelo	Portugal
bronze medal	Pauline Mahieu	France

The Women's 200 metre backstroke competition of the 2026 European Aquatics Championships was held on 10 and 11 August 2026.

== Records ==
Prior to the competition, the existing world, European and championship records were as follows:

	Name	Nation	Time	Location	Date
World record	Kaylee McKeown	Australia	2:03.14	Sydney	10 March 2023
European record	Anastasia Zuyeva	Russia	2:04.94	Rome	1 August 2009
Championship record	Margherita Panziera	Italy	2:06.08	Budapest	23 May 2021

== Results ==
=== Heats ===
The heats were started at 10:26.

Rank	Heat	Lane	Swimmer	Nation	Time	Notes
1	1	5	Katie Shanahan	Great Britain	2:09.29	Q
2	2	5	Lise Seidel	Germany	2:10.02	Q
3	2	4	Estella Tonrath	Spain	2:10.22	Q
4	1	4	Pauline Mahieu	France	2:10.62	Q
5	3	3	Camila Rebelo	Portugal	2:10.67	Q
6	2	3	Eszter Szabó-Feltóthy	Hungary	2:10.74	Q
7	3	4	Anastasiya Shkurdai	Neutral Athletes A	2:10.97	Q
8	1	6	Jeanne Lechevalier	France	2:11.30	Q
9	3	6	Gabriela Georgieva	Bulgaria	2:11.48	Q
10	1	2	Aviv Barzelay	Israel	2:11.55	Q
11	2	7	Federica Toma	Italy	2:11.58	Q
12	3	5	Bertille Cousson	France	2:11.94	
13	2	2	Fanni Kokas	Hungary	2:12.16	Q
14	2	6	Adela Piskorska	Poland	2:12.32	Q
15	2	1	Tom Mienis	Israel	2:12.40	Q
16	1	7	Lottie Cullen	Ireland	2:12.84	Q
17	3	7	Alessia Bianchi	Italy	2:13.56	Q
18	3	2	Sara Costa	Spain	2:13.61	R
19	1	8	Eleni Antoniadou	Greece	2:13.79	R
20	3	8	Fanny Borer	Switzerland	2:14.12	
21	3	1	Schastine Tabor	Denmark	2:14.77	
22	1	1	Gaia Rasmussen	Switzerland	2:14.82	
23	2	8	Emma Brogaard Krogh	Denmark	2:15.75	
24	1	0	Emilija Pociūtė	Lithuania	2:16.55	
25	2	0	Manon Richard	Switzerland	2:17.11	
26	3	0	Ana Nizharadze	Georgia	2:17.92	
27	1	3	Laura Bernat	Poland	2:18.58	
28	2	9	Iman Avdić	Bosnia and Herzegovina	2:22.34	
29	3	9	Erina Idrizaj	Kosovo	2:28.80	

=== Semifinals ===
Rank	Heat	Lane	Swimmer	Nation	Time	Notes
1	2	4	Katie Shanahan	Great Britain	2:07.61	Q
2	2	3	Camila Rebelo	Portugal	2:08.48	Q
3	2	5	Estella Tonrath	Spain	2:08.99	Q
4	1	5	Pauline Mahieu	France	2:09.20	Q
5	1	4	Lise Seidel	Germany	2:09.43	Q
6	1	3	Eszter Szabó-Feltóthy	Hungary	2:09.84	Q
7	2	6	Anastasiya Shkurdai	Neutral Athletes A	2:10.76	Q
8	1	2	Aviv Barzelay	Israel	2:11.01	Q
9	1	1	Tom Mienis	Israel	2:11.07	
10	1	6	Jeanne Lechevalier	France	2:11.15	
11	2	2	Gabriela Georgieva	Bulgaria	2:11.20	
12	2	8	Lottie Cullen	Ireland	2:12.22	
13	2	1	Adela Piskorska	Poland	2:12.43	
14	2	7	Federica Toma	Italy	2:13.96	
15	1	8	Alessia Bianchi	Italy	2:14.14	
16	1	7	Fanni Kokas	Hungary	2:15.00	

=== Final ===
Rank	Lane	Swimmer	Nation	Time	Notes
1st place, gold medalist(s)	4	Katie Shanahan	Great Britain	2:06.13	NR
2nd place, silver medalist(s)	5	Camila Rebelo	Portugal	2:07.62	
3rd place, bronze medalist(s)	6	Pauline Mahieu	France	2:08.63	
4	2	Lise Seidel	Germany	2:08.86	
5	3	Estella Tonrath	Spain	2:09.05	
6	7	Eszter Szabó-Feltóthy	Hungary	2:09.96	
7	8	Aviv Barzelay	Israel	2:11.66	
8	1	Anastasiya Shkurdai	Neutral Athletes A	2:13.03	
