= 2025 European U-23 Swimming Championships =

International swimming competition

- Host city: Šamorín, Slovakia
- Dates: 26–28 June
- Main venue: National Aquatics Training Centre, Samorin

The 2025 European U-23 Swimming Championships were held from 26 to 28 June 2025 in Šamorín, Slovakia. This was the second edition of these championships. The Championships were for swimmers aged 19 to 23.

== Results ==
=== Men ===
Games	Gold		Silver		Bronze	
50 m freestyle	Diogo Ribeiro; Portugal	21.67 NR	Vladyslav Bukhov; Ukraine	21.74	David Popovici; Romania	21.86
50 m freestyle skins	Filippos Andriadakis; Greece	—N/a	Bjørnar Grytnes Laskerud; Norway	—N/a	Božo Puhalović; Croatia	—N/a
100 m freestyle	David Popovici; Romania	46.71 ER	Jere Hribar; Croatia	48.33	Toni Dragoja; Croatia	48.67
200 m freestyle	David Popovici; Romania	1:43.64	Petar Mitsin; Bulgaria	1:46.48 NR	Charlie Hutchison; Great Britain	1:46.84
400 m freestyle	Petar Mitsin; Bulgaria	3:46.66	Tyler Melbourne-Smith; Great Britain	3:48.69	Sašo Boškan; Slovenia	3:49.26 NR
800 m freestyle	Swen Schwarz; Germany	7:38.98	Petar Mitsin; Bulgaria	7:52.32	Émile Vincent; France	7:53.58
1500 m freestyle	Swen Schwarz; Germany	14:38.96	Émile Vincent; France	14:59.62	Filippo Bertoni; Italy	15:10.31
50 m backstroke	Ksawery Masiuk; Poland	24.82	Lysander Osman; France	24.88	Ádám Jászó; Hungary	25.02
100 m backstroke	Jack Skerry; Great Britain	53.35	Oleksandr Zheltyakov; Ukraine	53.93	Matthew Ward; Great Britain	54.29
200 m backstroke	Apostolos Siskos; Greece	1:55.84	Oleksandr Zheltyakov; Ukraine	1:57.34	Cameron Brooker; Great Britain	1:58.45
50 m breaststroke	Luka Mladenovic; Austria	26.72 NR	Volodymyr Lisovets; Ukraine	27.29	Dawid Wiekiera; Poland	27.58
100 m breaststroke	Luka Mladenovic; Austria	59.97	Volodymyr Lisovets; Ukraine	1:00.36	Ivo Kroes; Netherlands	1:00.62
200 m breaststroke	Luka Mladenovic; Austria	2:10.08	Eoin Corby; Ireland	2:10.50	Maksym Ovchinnikov; Ukraine	2:10.77
50 m butterfly	Diogo Ribeiro; Portugal	23.01	Vladyslav Bukhov; Ukraine	23.09	Denis Popescu; Romania	23.43
100 m butterfly	Denis Popescu; Romania	51.48 NR	Diogo Ribeiro; Portugal	51.73	Vili Sivec; Croatia	52.22
200 m butterfly	Krzysztof Chmielewski; Poland	1:54.91	Andrea Camozzi; Italy	1:56.94	Apostolos Siskos; Greece	1:57.23
200 m individual medley	Dominik Török; Hungary	2:00.00	Vadym Naumenko; Ukraine	2:00.51	Daniil Giourtzidis; Greece	2:00.56
400 m individual medley	Cedric Bussing; Germany	4:13.93	Charlie Hutchinson; Great Britain	4:14.12	Dominik Török; Hungary	4:15.17

=== Women ===
Games	Gold		Silver		Bronze	
50 m freestyle	Milou van Wijk; Netherlands	24.23	Roos Vanotterdijk; Belgium	28.23	Darcy Revitt; Great Britain	28.35
50 m freestyle skins	Milou van Wijk; Netherlands	—N/a	Nikolett Pádár; Hungary	—N/a	Iris Julia Berger; Austria	—N/a
100 m freestyle	Milou van Wijk; Netherlands	53.66	Nina Jane Holt; Germany	54.01	Lilla Minna Ábrahám; Hungary	54.36
200 m freestyle	Nikolett Pádár; Hungary Lilla Minna Ábrahám; Hungary	1:56.03	Not awarded		Justina Kozan; Poland	1:58.26
400 m freestyle	Maya Werner; Germany	4:07.89	Francisca Martins; Portugal	4:09.03	Lilla Minna Ábrahám; Hungary	4:09.56
800 m freestyle	Maya Werner; Germany	8:29.53	Klaudia Tarasiewicz; Poland	8:33.93 NR	Artemis Vasilaki; Greece	8:34.35
1500 m freestyle	Artemis Vasilaki; Greece	16:22.20	Klaudia Tarasiewicz; Poland	16:26.58 NR	Marian Plöger; Germany	16:32.40
50 m backstroke	Roos Vanotterdijk; Belgium	28.05	Adela Piskorska; Poland	28.23	Zoé Carlos-Broc; France	28.35
100 m backstroke	Adela Piskorska; Poland	1:00.01	Roos Vanotterdijk; Belgium	1:00.27	Bertille Cousson; France	1:00.90
200 m backstroke	Honey Osrin; Great Britain	2:11.28	Adela Piskorska; Poland	2:11.50	Bertille Cousson; France	2:11.65
50 m breaststroke	Eneli Jefimova; Estonia	30.03	Silje Slyngstadli; Norway	30.55 NR	Kotryna Teterevkova; Lithuania	30.68
100 m breaststroke	Eneli Jefimova; Estonia	1:06.30	Kotryna Teterevkova; Lithuania	1:07.50	Ellie McCartney; Ireland	1:07.58
200 m breaststroke	Clara Rybak-Andersen; Denmark	2:23.89	Ellie McCartney; Ireland	2:24.02	Kotryna Teterevkova; Lithuania	2:24.86
50 m butterfly	Roos Vanotterdijk; Belgium	25.63 NR	Tamara Potocká; Slovakia	25.86 NR	Daryna Nabojčenko; Czech Republic	25.90 NR
100 m butterfly	Roos Vanotterdijk; Belgium	57.10	Georgia Damasioti; Greece	58.06	Lucy Grieve; Great Britain	58.71
200 m butterfly	Georgia Damasioti; Greece	2:09.21 NR	Lana Pudar; Bosnia and Herzegovina	2:10.85	Laura Lahtinen; Finland	2:12.05
200 m individual medley	Ellie McCartney; Ireland	2:12.50	Bertille Cousson; France	2:13.72	Tamara Potocká; Slovakia	2:13.82
400 m individual medley	Justina Kozan; Poland	4:41.57	Giada Alzetta; Italy	4:44.31	Eszter Szabó-Feltóthy; Hungary	4:47.23

=== Mixed events ===
Games	Gold		Silver		Bronze	
Mixed 4 × 100 m medley	Poland	3:48.25	Great Britain	3:48.27	Greece	3:48.54
Mixed 4 × 100 m freestyle	Hungary	3:27.13	Germany	3:27.16	Great Britain	3:27.93

== Medal table ==
2025 European U-23 Swimming Championships

* Host nation (Slovakia)

Rank	Nation	Gold	Silver	Bronze	Total
1	Poland (POL)	5	4	2	11
2	Germany (GER)	5	2	1	8
3	Hungary (HUN)	4	1	5	10
4	Greece (GRE)	4	1	4	9
5	Belgium (BEL)	3	2	0	5
6	Romania (ROU)	3	0	2	5
7	Austria (AUT)	3	0	1	4
7	Netherlands (NED)	3	0	1	4
9	Great Britain (GBR)	2	3	6	11
10	Portugal (POR)	2	2	0	4
11	Estonia (EST)	2	0	0	2
12	Ireland (IRL)	1	2	1	4
13	Bulgaria (BUL)	1	2	0	3
14	Denmark (DEN)	1	0	0	1
15	Ukraine (UKR)	0	7	1	8
16	France (FRA)	0	3	4	7
17	Italy (ITA)	0	2	1	3
18	Norway (NOR)	0	2	0	2
19	Croatia (CRO)	0	1	3	4
20	Lithuania (LTU)	0	1	2	3
21	Slovakia (SVK)*	0	1	1	2
22	Bosnia and Herzegovina (BIH)	0	1	0	1
23	Czech Republic (CZE)	0	0	1	1
23	Finland (FIN)	0	0	1	1
23	Slovenia (SLO)	0	0	1	1
Totals (25 entries)		39	37	38	114

Source: European Aquatics U23 Swimming Championships, Samorin 2025 - Medal table
