= Swimming at the 2026 European Aquatics Championships – Mixed 4 × 200 metre freestyle relay =

Mixed 4 × 200 metre freestyle relay at the 2026 European Aquatics Championships
- Venue: Paris Aquatic Centre
- Dates: 15 August
- Competitors: 57 from 11 nations
- Teams: 11
- Winning time: 7:24.13 CR

Medalists
gold medal	Jack McMillan; Matt Richards; Freya Colbert; Freya Anderson; Leah Schlosshan; Tyler Melbourne-Smith	Great Britain
silver medal	Lukas Märtens; Jarno Baschnitt; Linda Roth; Maya Tobehn; Timo Sorgius; Nicole Maier	Germany
bronze medal	Grigorii Vekovishchev; Ivan Giryov; Daria Klepikova; Kseniia Misharina; Roman Akimov; Andrei Cherepkov; Sofia Diakova

The Mixed 4 × 200 metre freestyle relay competition of the 2026 European Aquatics Championships was held on 15 August 2026.

== Records ==
Prior to the competition, the existing European and championship records were as follows.

	Team	Time	Location	Date
European record	Target time	7:22.33		
Championship record	Great Britain	7:26.67	Budapest	18 May 2021

== Results ==
=== Heats ===
The heats were started at 10:57.

Rank	Heat	Lane	Nation	Swimmers	Time	Notes
1	2	3	Great Britain	Tyler Melbourne-Smith (1:46.97); Jack McMillan (1:47.18); Leah Schlosshan (1:59.19); Freya Anderson (1:58.05)	7:31.39	Q
2	1	2	Lithuania	Kristupas Trepočka (1:48.59); Tajus Juška (1:48.34); Sylvia Statkevičius (1:58.44); Ieva Jurkūnaitė (1:56.60)	7:31.97	Q
3	2	5	Germany	Jarno Baschnitt (1:46.77); Timo Sorgius (1:47.19); Nicole Maier (1:59.99); Maya Tobehn (1:58.12)	7:32.07	Q
4	2	6	Italy	Filippo Megli (1:46.95); Marco De Tullio (1:47.04); Matilde Biagiotti (1:59.95); Anna Chiara Mascolo (1:58.56)	7:32.50	Q
5	1	5	France	Roman Fuchs (1:47.45); Sauveur Cristofini (1:47.78); Giulia Rossi-Bene (1:59.62); Lucile Tessariol (1:57.66)	7:32.51	Q
6	1	6	Neutral Athletes B	Roman Akimov (1:47.14); Andrei Cherepkov (1:48.11); Sofia Diakova (1:59.62); Kseniia Misharina (1:57.76)	7:32.63	Q
7	2	4	Sweden	Ludvig Bartolek (1:47.45); Robin Hanson (1:48.20); Elvira Mörtstrand (1:59.36); Sofia Åstedt (2:00.73)	7:35.74	Q, NR
8	1	3	Spain	Carlos Garach (1:48.32); Miguel Pérez-Godoy (1:48.03); Ainhoa Campabadal (1:59.44); María Daza (2:00.19)	7:35.98	Q
9	1	4	Greece	Konstantinos Englezakis (1:48.96); Konstantinos Stamou (1:49.15); Nikoletta Pavlopoulou (2:02.69); Artemis Vasilaki (2:04.37)	7:45.17	NR
10	2	7	Switzerland	Tiago Behar (1:50.81); Marius Toscan (1:51.06); Gaia Rasmussen (2:02.89); Manon Richard (2:06.49)	7:51.25	
11	2	2	Armenia	Gevorg Tonoyan (2:05.15); Ashot Chakhoyan (2:01.92); Varsenik Manucharyan (2:13.10); Milania Gunko (2:15.52)	8:35.69	

=== Final ===
The final was held at 20:47.

Rank	Lane	Nation	Swimmers	Time	Notes
1st place, gold medalist(s)	4	Great Britain	Jack McMillan (1:47.09); Matthew Richards (1:45.85); Freya Colbert (1:55.23); Freya Anderson (1:55.96)	7:24.13	CR
2nd place, silver medalist(s)	3	Germany	Lukas Märtens (1:46.73); Jarno Baschnitt (1:45.87); Linda Roth (1:57.18); Maya Tobehn (1:55.65)	7:25.43	NR
3rd place, bronze medalist(s)	7	Neutral Athletes B	Grigorii Vekovishchev (1:47.52); Ivan Giryov (1:45.65); Daria Klepikova (1:55.98); Kseniia Misharina (1:57.20)	7:26.35	
4	5	Lithuania	Danas Rapšys (1:47.38); Tomas Navikonis (1:45.59); Sylvia Statkevičius (1:58.68); Ieva Jurkūnaitė (1:56.40)	7:28.35	
5	2	France	Roman Fuchs (1:46.98); Sauveur Cristofini (1:46.46); Giulia Rossi-Bene (1:59.18); Lucile Tessariol (1:58.08)	7:30.70	
6	1	Sweden	Robin Hanson (1:46.71); Ludvig Bartolek (1:48.10); Elvira Mörtstrand (1:59.04); Sofia Åstedt (1:58.25)	7:32.10	NR
7	8	Spain	Miguel Pérez-Godoy (1:47.54); César Castro (1:48.05); Ainhoa Campabadal (1:59.09); Alba Herrero (1:59.73)	7:34.41	
8	6	Italy	Filippo Megli (1:47.11); Jacopo Barbotti (1:50.84); Anna Chiara Mascolo (1:58.66); Bianca Nannucci (1:59.09)	7:35.70	
