= Alison Sheppard =

British swimmer

Alison Sheppard MBE
Personal information
- Full name: Alison Sheppard
- Born: 5 November 1972 (age 53) Glasgow, Scotland
- Height: 1.76 m (5 ft 9 in)
- Weight: 65 kg (143 lb)

Sport
- Sport: Swimming
- Strokes: Freestyle
- Club: Milngavie & Bearsden ASC
Medal record
Representing Great Britain
World Championships (LC)
Silver medal – second place	2001 Fukuoka	4×100 m freestyle
World Championships (SC)
Gold medal – first place	1999 Hong Kong	4×100 m freestyle
Silver medal – second place	2002 Moscow	50 m freestyle
Bronze medal – third place	1999 Hong Kong	50 m freestyle
Bronze medal – third place	2000 Athens	50 m freestyle
Bronze medal – third place	2000 Athens	4×100 m freestyle
Bronze medal – third place	2002 Moscow	100 m medley
European Championships (LC)
Bronze medal – third place	1999 Istanbul	50 m freestyle
Bronze medal – third place	1999 Istanbul	4×100 m freestyle
European Championships (SC)
Gold medal – first place	2002 Riesa	50 m freestyle
Gold medal – first place	2003 Dublin	100 m indiv. medley
Silver medal – second place	2000 Valencia	50 m freestyle
Silver medal – second place	2000 Valencia	4×50 m freestyle
Silver medal – second place	2002 Riesa	100 m indiv. medley
Silver medal – second place	2003 Dublin	50 m freestyle
Bronze medal – third place	1998 Sheffield	4×50 m freestyle
Bronze medal – third place	1999 Lisbon	4×50 m freestyle
Bronze medal – third place	2000 Valencia	4×50 m medley
Representing Scotland
Commonwealth Games
Gold medal – first place	2002 Manchester	50 m freestyle
Silver medal – second place	1998 Kuala Lumpur	50 m freestyle
Bronze medal – third place	2002 Manchester	50 m butterfly

Alison Sheppard, MBE (born 5 November 1972) is a freestyle swimmer from Scotland.

== Swimming career ==
She competed in five consecutive Summer Olympics for Great Britain, starting in 1988.

She is a seven times winner of the British Championship in 50 metres freestyle (1991 and 1999–2004) and the 2003 100 metres freestyle.

Sheppard was appointed Member of the Order of the British Empire (MBE) in the 2003 Birthday Honours for services to swimming.

She retired from competitive swimming in 2005 and teaches swimming in Stirling in her own swimming school.

=== Personal bests and records held ===
Event	Long course	Short course
50 m freestyle	24.68 (2002) ^{NR}	24.06 (2003) ^{NR}
100 m freestyle	55.38 (2003)	53.91 (2002)
50 m butterfly	27.05 (2001)	27.13 (2001)
100 m individual medley		1:00.76 (2002) ^{NR}
Record Key NR:British

== See also ==
- List of World Aquatics Championships medalists in swimming (women)
- List of Commonwealth Games medallists in swimming (women)

Sporting positions
Preceded by (Slovenia) Martina Moravcová	Female World Cup Overall Winner; 2002/2003	Succeeded by (Slovenia) Martina Moravcová
