= Celine Rieder =

German swimmer (born 2001)

Personal information
- Born: 18 January 2001 (age 25) Wittlich, Germany

Sport
- Sport: Swimming
Medal record
Representing Germany
World Championships (LC)
| Gold medal – first place | 2025 Singapore | Team open water |
European Championships (LC)
| Silver medal – second place | 2024 Belgrade | 1500 m freestyle |
European Junior Championships
| Silver medal – second place | 2016 Hódmezővásárhely | 1500 m freestyle |
| Silver medal – second place | 2018 Helsinki | 800 m freestyle |
| Silver medal – second place | 2018 Helsinki | 1500 m freestyle |
| Silver medal – second place | 2018 Helsinki | 4×200 m freestyle |

Celine Rieder (born 18 January 2001) is a German swimmer. She competed in the women's 1500 metre freestyle event at the 2017 World Aquatics Championships.
