= Ron Jacks =

Canadian swimmer (born 1948)

Biographical details
- Born: January 23, 1948 (age 78); Winnipeg, Manitoba
- Height: 1.85 m (6 ft 1 in)
- Weight: 71 kg (157 lb)
- Education: Indiana University

Playing career
- 1965-1972: Indiana University; Coach James "Doc" Counsilman; 1964, 1968, 1972 Olympics
- Positions: Butterfly, freestyle

Coaching career (HC unless noted)
- 1972-1974: Arbutus Swim Club; Vancouver Pacific SC; Vancouver, B.C.
- 1974-1984: Hyack Swim Club; New Westminster, Vancouver
- 1984-1988: Victoria Amateur Swim Club; Victoria, B.C.
- 1988-2002: Island Swimming Club; Victoria B.C.
- 2002-2022: Pacific Coast Swimming; Victoria B.C. Director, Coach
- 2005-2013: Swimming Canada Open Water Coach
- 2022-: Pacific Coast Swimming; Coach Emeritus
Medal record
Men's swimming
Representing Canada
Pan American Games
| Silver medal – second place | 1967 Winnipeg | 4×100 m freestyle |
| Silver medal – second place | 1967 Winnipeg | 4×200 m freestyle |
| Silver medal – second place | 1967 Winnipeg | 4×100 m medley |
| Silver medal – second place | 1971 Cali | 4×200 m freestyle |
Commonwealth Games
| Gold medal – first place | 1966 Kingston | 110 yd butterfly |
| Gold medal – first place | 1966 Kingston | 4×110 yd medley |
| Silver medal – second place | 1966 Kingston | 4×110 yd freestyle |
| Silver medal – second place | 1966 Kingston | 4×220 yd freestyle |
| Silver medal – second place | 1970 Edinburgh | 4×100 m freestyle |
| Silver medal – second place | 1970 Edinburgh | 4×200 m freestyle |
| Bronze medal – third place | 1970 Edinburgh | 100 m butterfly |

Ronald Brian Jacks (born January 23, 1948) is a Canadian Olympic and international swimmer who competed in the 1960s and 1970s and later a Hall of Fame Canadian coach. In his collegiate career, he swam for the University of Indiana under legendary Hall of Fame Coach "Doc" James Counsilman. Jacks's coaching has produced finalists or semi-finalists at every Olympic Games since 1976. Since 2002, he has been a leading coach for Canadian swimmers such as Richard Weinberger through Victoria, British Columbia's Pacific Coast Swimming, which he helped to found. Pacific Coast Swimming has included many top-rated University of Victoria swimmers among its members. To date, Jacks has had three Olympic bronze medalists, which include Shannon Smith, Pam Rai and Richard Weinberger.

Jacks was born January 23, 1948, in Winnipeg, Manitoba, and began swimming by the age of six. After moving with his family to Vancouver, British Columbia. in 1955, he trained and competed with the Vancouver 'Y' swim club, where he was managed by Canadian coach Ted Simpson. As a member of the "Y" club, Jacks won numerous medals at the 1964, 1965, and 1966 Canadian age-group national swimming championships.

He attended and swam for Indiana University from around 1966 to 1971, where he trained under James "Doc" Counsilman. An exceptional team during his swimming tenure, Indiana University won the NCAA Swimming and Diving Division I National Championship every year from 1968 to 1972. Among his teammates was Olympian Mark Spitz, who captured seven gold medals at the 1972 Summer Olympics. Jacks graduated from Indiana with a Bachelor of Science degree in zoology in 1971.

== 1964-72 Olympics ==
At 15, he represented Canada at the 1964 Summer Olympics in Tokyo, where he swam the 400 meter freestyle placing 20th, the 4x100 Meter freestyle relay placing 11th, the 4x200 Meter freestyle relay placing 9th, the 200 meter backstroke placing 22nd, and the 4x100 meter Medley relay placing 10th.

Having enrolled at Indiana University, Jacks again represented Canada in the 1968 Summer Olympics in Mexico City, placing 16th in the 400 metres Freestyle, a notable 4th in the 4 × 200 metres Freestyle Relay with a combined team time of 8:03.2, 19th in the 100 metres Butterfly, and 20th in the 200 metres Butterfly.

At the 1972 Summer Olympics in Munich, he placed 23rd in the 400 metres freestyle, and 15th in the 200 meter freestyle.

== International swimming ==
At the 1966 British Empire and Commonwealth Games held in Kingston, Jamaica, he won a gold medal in the 110 yard butterfly. In the 1970 British Commonwealth Games in Edinburgh, Scotland, he won a bronze medal in the 100 metre butterfly. As part of the National team, he represented Canada at the 1967 and 1971 Pan-Am Games.

Between 1964 and 1972, Jacks set seven Canadian records and won numerous Canadian National Championships. He is a member of the Canadian Swimming Hall of Fame, the BC Sports Hall of Fame and the Swim BC Halls of Fame. He won the 1969 British 'Open' ASA National Championship 440 yards freestyle title and the 1650 yards freestyle title.

In his final years of competition, Jacks swam with Nort Thornton at the University of California, Berkeley.

Around 1969, Jacks married his wife, Patricia Ann, before fully retiring as a swimming competitor. Two of his sons would later swim in their youths by 1993.

== Coaching ==
In 1972, Jacks retired from competitive swimming and turned his attention to coaching, starting in Vancouver as the head coach for the Arbutus Swim Club. He later founded the Vancouver Pacific Swim Club. Jacks became head coach with the Hyack Swim Club from around 1974 to 1984, where Shannon Smith was one of his first outstanding swimmers and future Olympic medalists.

Jacks then moved to Victoria to become the head coach of the Victoria Amateur Swim Club from 1984 to 1988. In 1984, the club was sometimes known as the Vic-O's, and would later become a division of Victoria Island Swimming. In 1988, he helped in the formation of Victoria's Island Swimming and held the position of Director of Swimming until 2002. After 1994, Island Swimming had the use of Greater Victoria's Saanich Commonwealth Place pool, a premier facility with a 25 meter competition pool, a 25 meter lap pool, a diving well, and an extensive weight room. Saanich Commonwealth Place was affiliated with the University of Victoria and had served as the host facility for the Commonwealth Games. Island Swimming had a number of Olympians and University of Victoria swim competitors as members. In 2002, he and fellow coaches Rod Barratt and Mark Lancaster formed Pacific Coast Swimming in Victoria, where Ron served as Director of Swimming through 2022. One of the facilities for Pacific Coast Swimming in Victoria has been the McKinnon pool on the University of Victoria Campus, a six lane pool with a diving well. In 2022, Jacks moved from Director of swimming of Pacific Coast Swimming to a Coach/Emeritus position for the club.

Jacks was the Paralympic Coach for the 2004 Athens Games and was the Canadian Open Water Head Coach at the 2005 World Aquatic Championships in Montreal and 2006 Pan Pacific Championships in Victoria. He served as Swimming Canada's Open Water Head Coach from 2005-2013.

Jacks is a Canadian NCCP Level IV and NCI Master Coach. He has received numerous recognitions for coaching excellence by Swim BC, the BC Swim Coaches Association, the Canadian Swim Coaches and Teachers Association, and Swim-Natation Canada.

== Coaching achievements ==
Ron has produced finalists or semi-finalists at every Olympic Games from 1976–2004, and to date has coached three Olympians to Bronze medals, including Shannon Smith, Pam Rai, and Richard Weinberger. He coached two World Champion Open Water swimmers (Kim Dyke - 1993 Open Water World Cup Series Champion and Greg Streppel - 1994 World Open Water Champion). He is one of the very few coaches who has completed a three-way achievement at the International level, with medalists among able-bodied swimmers, swimmers with a disability, and open-water swimmers. From 1984-1994 in Victoria he also coached 1988 butterfly Olympian Jon Kelly, Anne Barnes, and 200 backstroke specialist Nikki Dryden.

== Jacks's top swimmers and their achievements ==
- Olympians Bronze medals - Shannon Smith, Pam Rai and, Richard Weinberger
- World Champion Open Water swimmers: Kim Dyke, 1993 Open Water World Cup Series Champion, Greg Streppel - 1994 World Open Water Champion;
- Paralympic Gold Medalist/World Record Holder: Stephanie Dixon;
- Olympic Finalists: Christin Petelski (1996, 2000), Nikki Dryden, and Jon Kelly;
- Commonwealth Games athletes: Danielle Bell, John Stamhuis, Philip Weiss, Suzanne Weckend, Dino Verbrugge and Anne Barnes;
- FINA Open Water Championship competitor: David Creel, Karley Stutzel, Richard Weinberger.

=== Honors ===
He is a member of the Canadian Swimming Hall of Fame, the BC Sports Hall of Fame and the Swim BC Halls of Fame. Jacks received a National Domestic Excellence in Coaching Award in 2003 and 2004, a Petro-Canada National Coaching Excellence Award in 2004, and a 2004 International CSCTA Team Award. He was also awarded the 2004 and 2005 BC Coach of the Year (SWAD), and the 2002 BC Coach of the Year (16 and under age group). He is a 2022 Inductee to the Canadian Swimming Coaches Association Hall of Fame. He was named as the National Open Water Coach of the Year in 2002, 2003, 2004 and 2005. In 2005, he was named the Swimming Canada National Open Water Head Coach.

== See also ==
- List of Commonwealth Games medallists in swimming (men)
