= Hannah Casey (swimmer) =

Australian swimmer (born 2006)

Personal information
- Nationality: Australian
- Born: 27 April 2006 (age 20) Brisbane, Australia

Sport
- Sport: Swimming
- Strokes: Freestyle
Medal record
Women's swimming
Representing Australia
World Championships (LC)
Gold medal – first place	2025 Singapore	4×100 m freestyle
Gold medal – first place	2025 Singapore	4×200 m freestyle
Commonwealth Games
Gold medal – first place	2026 Glasgow	4×200 m freestyle
Gold medal – first place	2026 Glasgow	4×100 m freestyle
Gold medal – first place	2026 Glasgow	4×100 m mixed freestyle
Pan Pacific Championships
Gold medal – first place	2026 Irvine	4×200 m freestyle
World Junior Championships
Gold medal – first place	2023 Netanya	4×100 m freestyle
Gold medal – first place	2023 Netanya	4×100 m mixed freestyle
Silver medal – second place	2023 Netanya	4×200 m freestyle
Bronze medal – third place	2023 Netanya	50 m freestyle

Hannah Casey (born 27 April 2006) is an Australian swimmer.

== Career ==
Casey competed at the 2023 World Aquatics Junior Swimming Championships and won gold medals in the 4×100 metre freestyle and 4×100 metre mixed freestyle relays, a silver medal in the 4×200 metre freestyle and a bronze medal in the 50 metre freestyle.

She made her World Aquatics Championships debut at the 2025 World Aquatics Championships and won gold medals in the 4 × 100 metre freestyle relay and 4 × 200 metre freestyle relay events.

In June 2026, she competed at the 2026 Australian Swimming Trials and was selected to represent Australia at the 2026 Commonwealth Games and 2026 Pan Pacific Swimming Championships. During the Commonwealth Games she won a gold medal in the 4 × 200 metre freestyle relay on 24 July 2026. The next day she won a gold medal in the 4 × 100 metre mixed freestyle relay. On 27 July 2026, she won a gold medal in the 4 × 200 metre freestyle relay. She finished the second leg in 1:55.43, six tenths of a second faster than her career-best of 1:56.09. In August 2026, she competed at the 2026 Pan Pacific Swimming Championships and won a gold medal in the 4 × 200 metre freestyle relay with a Pan Pacific Championships record time of 7:42.40.
