= Fleur Lewis =

British swimmer (born 2003)

Personal information
- Nationality: British (English)
- Born: 3 December 2003 (age 22) Barnet, England

Sport
- Sport: Swimming
- Event: 1500m freestyle / butterfly
- Club: Barnet Copthall SC
Medal record
Women's swimming
Representing Great Britain
European Championships
Silver medal – second place	2024 Belgrade	800 m freestyle
Bronze medal – third place	2024 Belgrade	1500 m freestyle

Fleur Lewis (3 December 2003) is a British champion and British international swimmer.

== Biography ==
Lewis, at age 10 transferred to the competitive programme at the Barnet Copthall SC. She competed for Barnet Copthall SC until age 16 when she transferred to Ellesmere College and competed for Great Britain at the 2019 European Junior Championships.

At the 2022 British Swimming Championships Lewis won the 1500 metres event, to claim her first senior national title. She also claimed a silver medal in the 800 metres.

Lewis won her first major international honours when winning two medals at the 2024 European Aquatics Championships.

In 2025, Lewis finished runner-up to Amelie Blocksidge in the 800 and 1500 metres freestyle events at the 2025 Aquatics GB Swimming Championships.
