= Dylan Broom =

Welsh para swimmer (born 2002)

Personal information
- Nickname: Broomy
- Nationality: British
- Born: 3 February 2002 (age 24) Abersychan, Wales

Sport
- Sport: Para swimming
- Disability class: S14, SM14 and SB14
- Club: Swansea University
- Coached by: Grahame Antwhistle
Medal record
Men's paralympic swimming
Representing United Kingdom
World Championships
Gold medal – first place	2025 Singapore	Mixed 4 × 100 m freestyle relay S14

Dylan Broom (born 3 February 2002) is a Welsh para swimmer. He competes in the S14 classification for swimmers with intellectual disabilities.

== Early life ==
Broom was born on 3 February 2002, in Abersychan, Torfaen, Wales. He was inspired to start swimming after watching the 2012 Summer Olympics and that year, he joined the Torfaen Dolphins.

== Career ==
Broom was given the S14 classification in September 2017. Two months later, he entered the national championships in the junior category, winning three golds and one silver. By September 2018, he competed in the British Nationals for the first time as a senior.

At the 2022 Commonwealth Games, Broom made his Commonwealth Games debut and finished 7th in the 200 m freestyle S14.

In August 2025, Broom was named to the British para swimming team for the 2025 World Para Swimming Championships held in Singapore, making it his first major international competition. The following month, he was part of the team that won the mixed 4 × 100 m freestyle relay S14 event.
