= Megan Barnes =

British swimmer

Personal information
- Nationality: British
- Born: 19 September 2003 (age 22) London, England

Sport
- Sport: Swimming
- Event: freestyle
- University team: Louisiana State University
- Club: Mount Kelly Swimming
Medal record
Representing Great Britain
British Championships
Gold medal – first place	2025 London	400m freestyle

Megan McKenzie Barnes (born 19 September 2003) is a swimmer who is a British champion.

== Career ==
Barnes was educated at Mount Kelly School and Louisiana State University. In 2022 she won 400m Freestyle gold medal at the Swim England National Summer Meet.

In 2025, Barnes became the British champion after winning the 400 metres freestyle title at the 2025 Aquatics GB Swimming Championships.
