= Jack McMillan (swimmer) =

Northern Irish swimmer (born 2000)

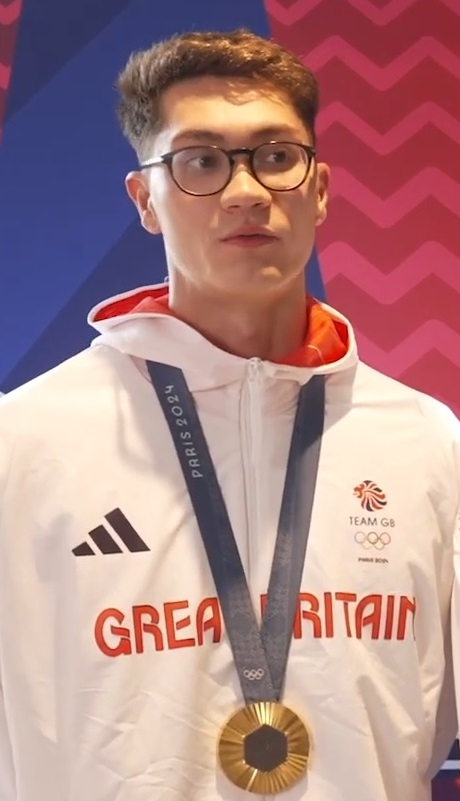
- McMillan at the 2024 Summer Olympics

Personal information
- Nationality: Irish, British
- Born: 14 January 2000 (age 26) Belfast, County Antrim, Northern Ireland
- Height: 1.91 m (6 ft 3 in)

Sport
- Sport: Swimming
- Strokes: freestyle
- Club: University of Stirling
Medal record
Men's swimming
Representing Great Britain
Olympic Games
Gold medal – first place	2024 Paris	4×200 m freestyle
World Championships (LC)
Gold medal – first place	2025 Singapore	4×200 m freestyle
European Championships (LC)
Gold medal – first place	2026 Paris	4×200 m freestyle
Gold medal – first place	2026 Paris	4×200 m mixed freestyle
European Championships (SC)
Gold medal – first place	2025 Lublin	400 m freestyle
Silver medal – second place	2025 Lublin	200 m freestyle
Representing Northern Ireland
Commonwealth Youth Games
Bronze medal – third place	2017 Nassau	200 m freestyle

Jack McMillan (born 14 January 2000) is a swimmer from Belfast, Northern Ireland, who competed for Ireland in the men's 4 × 200 metre freestyle relay at the 2020 Summer Olympics and in the same event for Great Britain at the 2024 Summer Olympics. McMillan won gold in the latter event as a heat swimmer. In 2025 he won his first major international individual title, taking gold in the 400 metre freestyle at the 2025 European Short Course Swimming Championships in Lublin.

== Biography ==
McMillan swam in the heats of the 4 × 200 metre freestyle relay and although he was swapped out of the final for Duncan Scott, McMillan was awarded a gold medal as a heat swimmer when the British team won the final. In doing so he became only the second Northern Irish swimmer ever to win an Olympic gold medal in 128 years; the first had been his friend and former Team Ireland teammate Daniel Wiffen, in the same pool some 20 minutes earlier in the 800 metres freestyle.

In 2025, McMillan finished third behind James Guy in the 400 metres freestyle title at the 2025 Aquatics GB Swimming Championships and earned selection for the 2025 World Aquatics Championships in Singapore. Subsequently at the World Championships, he won the gold medal as part of the 4×200 metres freestyle team, alongside Matt Richards, James Guy, and Duncan Scott.
