= Eva Okaro =

English swimmer (born 2006)

Personal information
- Born: 10 November 2006 (age 20) Sevenoaks, England
- Education: Repton School

Sport
- Sport: Swimming
- Strokes: Freestyle
- Club: Repton Swimming; Sevenoaks SC
Medal record
Women's swimming
Representing Great Britain
World Championships (SC)
Silver medal – second place	2024 Budapest	4×100 m medley
European Junior Championships
Silver medal – second place	2021 Rome	4x100 m freestyle
Bronze medal – third place	2021 Rome	50 m freestyle
Bronze medal – third place	2021 Rome	4x100 m medley

Eva Okaro (born 10 November 2006) is a British swimmer who competed at the 2024 Summer Olympics.

== Early life ==
From Kent, Eva and her twin sister Izabelle are both members of Sevenoaks Swimming Club. Previously, they were part of the Black Lions Swimming Club in Medway. She is coached by Ash Morris at Repton School, in Derbyshire.

== Career ==
She won the 50m freestyle and 50m butterfly events at the Winter Regionals in November 2019. Subsequently, she competed at the EURO Meet in Luxembourg in January 2020, representing the Swim England South East team in the 100m backstroke, 50m and 100m butterfly, 50m, 100m and 200m freestyle, as well as the 4 × 100 m freestyle relay. She won gold in the relay and silver in the 50m butterfly, 100m butterfly and 100m freestyle.

When she was 14 years old she won a 50m Freestyle bronze medal at the 2021 European Junior Swimming Championships in Rome, and won silver in the 4 × 100 m freestyle relay. In so doing, she set a British age record with her time of 55.36sec, which was 1.4sec faster than the previous best, set by Fran Halsall. Following that she joined elite training weekends with the Britain senior team at the Loughborough Performance Centre.

In July 2022, she won the 50m freestyle and the 100m freestyle at the U16 British National Championships.

In December 2023, she participated in the Ontario Junior International and was part of the mixed 50m Freestyle team that won gold and came inside the world junior record time. She also won the gold medal in the women's 4 × 100 m freestyle and won gold in the 4 × 100 m mixed medley, which set a new European junior record time. She also set a new British junior record in the heats for the 50m freestyle.

In March 2024, she set a new personal best winning the 100m freestyle at the 2024 City of Sheffield Premier Meet.

In April 2024, Okaro finished second behind Anna Hopkin in the 50m and 100m freestyle at the British Championships and Paris trials in London. Subsequently, she was selected as part of the 2024 British Olympic team to participate in the 50m and 100m freestyle events, as well as the 4 × 100 m freestyle relay.

In 2025, Okaro won the 50 metres freestyle title at the 2025 Aquatics GB Swimming Championships, which sealed a qualification place for the 2025 World Aquatics Championships in Singapore. She also won the 50 metres butterfly.

Competing for the University of Texas, she won silver medals in the 50m and 100m freestyle at the 2026 SEC Championships. At the 2026 Aquatics GB Swimming Championships, she won three gold medals. She was selected to represent England at the 2026 Commonwealth Games in Glasgow.

== Personal life ==
Her father, Abuchi, is Nigerian and mother, Helena, is Polish.
