= Charlie Hutchison (swimmer) =

British swimmer (born 2003)

Personal information
- Nationality: British (Scottish)
- Born: 28 November 2003 (age 22) Palnackie, Scotland

Sport
- Sport: Swimming
- Event: Medley
- University team: Loughborough University
Medal record
Representing Scotland
European U-23 Championships
Silver medal – second place	2025 Samorin	400 m medley
Bronze medal – third place	2025 Samorin	200 m freestyle
European Youth Olympic Festival
Bronze medal – third place	2017 Győr	400 m medley
British Swimming Championships
Gold medal – first place	2023 Sheffield	400 m medley
Silver medal – second place	2024 London	400 m medley
Silver medal – second place	2025 London	400 m medley
Bronze medal – third place	2023 Sheffield	400 m freestyle

Charlie Hutchison (born 28 November 2003) is a swimmer from Scotland, who is a British Champion.

== Career ==
When swimming for Ellesmere College Titans in 2016, he won four gold medals at the all ages British Summer Championships. Hutchison represented Great Britain at the 2017 European Youth Olympics, winning a bronze medal. He later competed at both the 2018 and 2019 European Junior Championships.

He came to prominence in 2023, after winning the gold medal at the 2023 British Swimming Championships in the 400 metres medley.
