= Mark Tompsett =

British Paralympic swimmer (born 2006)

Personal information
- Nationality: British
- Born: 23 November 2006 (age 19) Chorley, Lancashire, England

Sport
- Sport: Para swimming
- Disability class: S14
Medal record
Men's paralympic swimming
Representing United Kingdom
Paralympic Games
| Bronze medal – third place | 2024 Paris | 100 m backstroke S14 |
European Championships
| Gold medal – first place | 2024 Funchal | 100 m backstroke S14 |

Mark Tompsett (born 23 November 2006) is an English Paralympic swimmer. He competes in the S14 classification for swimmers with intellectual disabilities. He represented Great Britain at the 2024 Summer Paralympics, winning a bronze medal.

== Early life ==
Mark Tompsett was born on 23 November 2006, in Chorley, Lancashire, England.

== Career ==
In April 2024, Tompsett competed at the 2024 World Para Swimming European Open Championships and won a gold medal in the 100 metre backstroke SB14 event. He then represented Great Britain at the 2024 Summer Paralympics and won a bronze medal in the 100 m backstroke S14 event.
