= Joshua Gammon =

British swimmer

Personal information
- Nationality: British (English)
- Born: 2003 (age 22–23) Barnstaple, Devon, England

Sport
- Sport: Swimming
- Event: Butterfly
- University team: University of Bath
- Club: Plymouth Leander / Barnstaple SC
Medal record
Representing England
British Swimming Championships
Gold medal – first place	2023 Sheffield	200m butterfly

Joshua Gammon (born 2003) is a swimmer from England, who is a British Champion.

== Career ==
Gammon won four medals at the 2021 British Universities and Colleges Sport short course championships, winning silver in the 400m freestyle relay and bronze in the 50m and 200m butterfly and 400m medley relay. Gammon also competes in Lifesaving (sport). He represented Great Britain at the 2022 Lifesaving World Championships, where he became a World Champion in the 4x50m Obstacle Relay and a vice-World Champion in the Board Rescue.

He won the gold medal at the 2023 British Swimming Championships in the 200 metres butterfly.

Gammon won the 200 metres butterfly at the 2024 Aquatics GB Swimming Championships but missed out on a place at the 2024 Summer Olympics.
