= Amelie Blocksidge =

British swimmer

Personal information
- Nationality: British (English)
- Born: 9 April 2009 (age 17) Salford, England

Sport
- Sport: Swimming
- Event: Freestyle
- Club: City of Salford SC
Medal record
Representing Great Britain
British Swimming Championships
Gold medal – first place	2023 Sheffield	1500m freestyle
Gold medal – first place	2024 London	800m freestyle
Gold medal – first place	2024 London	1500m freestyle
Gold medal – first place	2025 London	800m freestyle
Gold medal – first place	2025 London	1500m freestyle
Silver medal – second place	2023 Sheffield	800m freestyle
Silver medal – second place	2024 London	400m freestyle
Silver medal – second place	2025 London	400m freestyle
European Junior Championships
Gold medal – first place	2024 Vilnius	800 m freestyle
Gold medal – first place	2024 Vilnius	1500 m freestyle
Gold medal – first place	2025 Samorin	1500 m freestyle
Silver medal – second place	2023 Belgrade	1500 m freestyle
Bronze medal – third place	2025 Samorin	800 m freestyle
European Youth Olympic Festival
Gold medal – first place	2023 Maribor	800 m freestyle
Silver medal – second place	2023 Maribor	400 m freestyle

Amelie Blocksidge (born 9 April 2009) is a swimmer from England, who is a British Champion.

== Career ==
In 2022, Blocksidge won five events at the all ages British Summer Championships and also won the open water event. She was the youngest member of the England Youth Squad that raced in Sweden.

She came to prominence in 2023, after winning the gold medal at the 2023 British Swimming Championships in the 1500 metres freestyle. During the title win she broke the national record, after recording a time of 16 minutes, 19.67 seconds.

Blocksidge won both the 800 metres freestyle and the 1500 metres freestyle at the 2024 Aquatics GB Swimming Championships. Despite setting a national age-group record in the 800, Blocksidge missed out on a place at the 2024 Summer Olympics.

In 2025, Blocksidge successfully won her third successive 1500 metres freestyle title and second 800 metres title at the 2025 Aquatics GB Swimming Championships.
