= Tyler Melbourne-Smith =

British swimmer

Personal information
- Nationality: British
- Born: 7 August 2005 (age 21) Warrington, England

Sport
- Sport: Swimming
- Event: freestyle
- University team: Loughborough University
- Club: City of Liverpool SC
Medal record
Representing Great Britain
European Championships (LC)
Gold medal – first place	2026 Paris	4×200 m freestyle
Gold medal – first place	2026 Paris	4×200 m mixed freestyle
European U-23 Championships
Silver medal – second place	2025 Samorin	400 m freestyle
Representing Wales
Commonwealth Youth Games
Gold medal – first place	2023 Trinbago	400m freestyle
Gold medal – first place	2023 Trinbago	1500m freestyle

Tyler Melbourne-Smith (born 7 July 2005) is a swimmer from the United Kingdom who is a British champion and Commonwealth Youth gold medallist.

== Career ==
Melbourne-Smith was born in Warrington, England, and spent some early years in Dubai, but represents Wales through family heritage. In 2022, he was named Swim Wales Junior Performance Athlete of the Year and in the following year won two gold medals at the Swimming at the 2023 Commonwealth Youth Games, in the 400 metres and 1500 metres freestyle events.

In 2025, Melbourne-Smith became the British champion after winning the 800 metres freestyle title at the 2025 Aquatics GB Swimming Championships. He also finished runner-up to James Guy in the 400 metres freestyle.
