= Katie Shanahan =

British swimmer (born 2004)

Personal information
- Nationality: British (Scottish)
- Born: 25 June 2004 (age 22) Glasgow, Scotland

Sport
- Sport: Swimming
- Strokes: backstroke
- Club: University of Stirling; City of Glasgow
Medal record
Women's swimming
Representing Great Britain
European Championships (LC)
Gold medal – first place	2026 Paris	200 m backstroke
Gold medal – first place	2026 Paris	4×100 m medley
Silver medal – second place	2022 Rome	200 m backstroke
European Championships (SC)
Silver medal – second place	2025 Lublin	200 m backstroke
European Junior Championships
Gold medal – first place	2021 Rome	200 m medley
Gold medal – first place	2021 Rome	400 m medley
Silver medal – second place	2021 Rome	100 m backstroke
Silver medal – second place	2021 Rome	200 m backstroke
Silver medal – second place	2021 Rome	4×100 m mixed medley
Bronze medal – third place	2019 Kazan	400 m medley
Bronze medal – third place	2021 Rome	4×100 m medley
European Youth Olympic Festival
Gold medal – first place	2019 Baku	200 m backstroke
Gold medal – first place	2019 Baku	200 m medley
Gold medal – first place	2019 Baku	400 m medley
Silver medal – second place	2019 Baku	4×100 m freestyle
Silver medal – second place	2019 Baku	4×100 m medley
Silver medal – second place	2019 Baku	4×100 m mixed medley
Representing Scotland
Commonwealth Games
Silver medal – second place	2026 Glasgow	200 m backstroke
Bronze medal – third place	2022 Birmingham	400 m medley
Bronze medal – third place	2022 Birmingham	200 m backstroke

Katie Shanahan (born 25 June 2004) is a Scottish professional swimmer specialising in backstroke. She is the 2026 European Champion in the 200 metre backstroke, and has represented Great Britain at the 2024 Summer Olympics and Scotland at the Commonwealth Games in 2022 and 2026.

== Career ==
Shanahan competed in the women's 400 metre individual medley event at the 2021 FINA World Swimming Championships (25 m) in Abu Dhabi.

At the 2022 Commonwealth Games, held in Birmingham, England, starting in July, Shanahan won the bronze medal in the 400 metre individual medley with a time of 4:39.37. Three days later, she won the bronze medal in the 200 metre backstroke with a personal best time of 2:09.22.

In 2023, she won two gold medals at the 2023 British Swimming Championships in the 200 metres backstroke and the 200 metres medley. It was the second successive time that she had won the 200 backstroke title.

After finishing second in both the 200 metres backstroke and the 400 metres medley at the 2024 Aquatics GB Swimming Championships, Shanahan recorded times that met the British Consideration criteria for a place at the 2024 Summer Olympics. She was subsequently named in the British team for the Olympics, where she reached the Olympic final, finishing fifth in the women's 200 metre backstroke.

In 2025, Shanahan won both the 100 and 200 metres backstroke titles at the 2025 Aquatics GB Swimming Championships, which sealed a qualification place for the 2025 World Aquatics Championships in Singapore. However, her championships were hampered by illness, forcing her to withdraw from the semi-finals of the 200 metre backstroke.

After a season filled with injuries, Shanahan defended her 200 metre backstroke title at the 2026 Aquatics GB Swimming Championships, securing her spot on the team for her home Commonwealth games in Glasgow, where she claimed a Silver medal in the event. She then went on to lower the 200 metre backstroke British record on her way to the title at the 2026 European Aquatics Championships, marking her first senior major championship gold medal.
