= Leah Schlosshan =

British swimmer

Personal information
- Nationality: British (English)
- Born: 26 March 2005 (age 21) Adel, Leeds, England

Sport
- Sport: Swimming
- Event: Freestyle
- Club: City of Leeds
Medal record
Representing Great Britain
European Championships (LC)
| Gold medal – first place | 2026 Paris | 4×200 m freestyle |
| Gold medal – first place | 2026 Paris | 4×200 m mixed freestyle |
European Junior Championships
| Gold medal – first place | 2023 Belgrade | 200m medley |
| Gold medal – first place | 2022 Otopeni | 200m medley |
| Bronze medal – third place | 2021 Rome | 4×100 m medley |

Leah Schlosshan (born 26 March 2005) is a swimmer from England.

== Biography ==
Schlosshan was educated at Bradford Grammar School and swims for the City of Leeds.

Schlosshan came to prominence when winning double gold at the Irish National Winter Championships in 2022 and followed up this success by winning the 2023 British Summer Championships 400 medley title and won the gold medal at the 2023 European Junior Swimming Championships in Belgrade in the 200 metres individual medley.

In 2024, Schlosshan reached the final of the women's 200 metre freestyle at the 2024 European Aquatics Championships

In 2025, Schlosshan finished second behind Freya Colbert in the 200 metres freestyle at the 2025 Aquatics GB Swimming Championships, which sealed a qualification place for the 2025 World Aquatics Championships in Singapore. Subsequently at the World Championships, she reached the final of the 4×200 metres freestyle relay.
