= Swimming at the 2014 Commonwealth Games – Women's 100 metre butterfly =

Women's 100 metre butterfly at the 2014 Commonwealth Games
- Venue: Tollcross International Swimming Centre
- Dates: 24 July 2014 (heats & semis); 25 July 2014 (final)
- Competitors: 31 from 20 nations
- Winning time: 57.40 GR

Medalists
gold medal	Katerine Savard	Canada
silver medal	Siobhan-Marie O'Connor	England
bronze medal	Emma McKeon	Australia

The women's 100 metre butterfly event at the 2014 Commonwealth Games as part of the swimming programme took place on 24 and 25 July at the Tollcross International Swimming Centre in Glasgow, Scotland.

The medals were presented by Pamela Young, Chef de mission of Saint Helena at the 2014 Commonwealth Games and Secretary of the National Sports Association of Saint Helena and the quaichs were presented by Perry Crosswhite, Chief Executive Officer of the Australian Commonwealth Games Association.

== Records ==
Prior to this competition, the existing world and Commonwealth Games records were as follows.

World record	Dana Vollmer (USA)	55.98	London, England	29 July 2012
Commonwealth record	Jessicah Schipper (AUS)	56.23	Rome, Italy	27 July 2009
Games record	Jessicah Schipper (AUS)	57.48	Melbourne, Australia	19 March 2006

The following records were established during the competition:

Date	Event	Name	Nationality	Time	Record
25 July	Final	Katerine Savard	Canada	57.40	GR

== Results ==
=== Heats ===
Rank	Heat	Lane	Name	Nationality	Time	Notes
1	4	4	Alicia Coutts	Australia	57.93	Q
2	3	4	Katerine Savard	Canada	58.13	Q
3	4	3	Siobhan-Marie O'Connor	England	58.24	Q
4	3	5	Jemma Lowe	Wales	58.61	Q
5	3	3	Rachael Kelly	England	58.67	Q
6	4	5	Emma McKeon	Australia	58.83	Q
7	2	4	Ellen Gandy	Australia	58.92	Q
8	4	6	Alys Thomas	Wales	59.01	Q
9	2	3	Audrey Lacroix	Canada	59.14	Q
10	4	2	Tao Li	Singapore	59.22	Q
11	2	5	Charlotte Atkinson	Isle of Man	59.80	Q
12	3	2	Samantha Lee	New Zealand	1:00.29	Q
13	3	6	Tilly Gray	England	1:01.03	Q
14	2	6	Marne Erasmus	South Africa	1:01.81	Q
15	2	2	Quah Ting Wen	Singapore	1:01.90	Q
16	2	7	Gemma Kane	Northern Ireland	1:02.51	Q
17	3	7	Trudiann Patrick	Jamaica	1:02.82	
18	4	7	Yap Siew Hui	Malaysia	1:03.55	
19	4	1	Jannah Sonnenschein	Mozambique	1:03.98	
20	3	8	Zara Bailey	Jamaica	1:04.25	
21	3	1	Caroline Puamau	Fiji	1:04.72	
22	4	8	Felicity Passon	Seychelles	1:04.81	
23	2	1	Lara Butler	Cayman Islands	1:05.69	
24	2	8	Emily Chan Chee	Mauritius	1:07.39	
25	1	4	Tieri Erasito	Fiji	1:08.08	
26	1	2	Amarah Phillip	British Virgin Islands	1:09.19	
27	1	3	Tegan McCarthy	Papua New Guinea	1:10.20	
28	1	5	Martha Opiyo	Kenya	1:10.21	
29	1	6	Kiran Khan	Pakistan	1:12.14	
30	1	1	Ger Ogot	Kenya	1:12.81	
31	1	7	Areeba Shaikh	Pakistan	1:16.02	

=== Semifinals ===
Rank	Heat	Lane	Name	Nationality	Time	Notes
1	2	5	Siobhan-Marie O'Connor	England	57.57	Q
2	1	4	Katerine Savard	Canada	57.83	Q
3	2	4	Alicia Coutts	Australia	58.07	Q
4	1	3	Emma McKeon	Australia	58.40	Q
5	1	5	Jemma Lowe	Wales	58.47	Q
6	2	6	Ellen Gandy	Australia	58.48	Q
7	2	2	Audrey Lacroix	Canada	58.69	Q
8	2	3	Rachael Kelly	England	59.02	Q
9	1	6	Alys Thomas	Wales	59.52	
10	1	2	Tao Li	Singapore	59.82	
11	2	7	Charlotte Atkinson	Isle of Man	1:00.12	
12	1	7	Samantha Lee	New Zealand	1:00.27	
13	2	1	Tilly Gray	England	1:00.66	
14	1	1	Marne Erasmus	South Africa	1:00.72	
15	2	8	Quah Ting Wen	Singapore	1:01.48	
16	1	8	Gemma Kane	Northern Ireland	1:02.74	

=== Final ===
Rank	Lane	Name	Nationality	Time	Notes
1st place, gold medalist(s)	5	Katerine Savard	Canada	57.40	GR
2nd place, silver medalist(s)	4	Siobhan-Marie O'Connor	England	57.45	
3rd place, bronze medalist(s)	6	Emma McKeon	Australia	57.66	
4	3	Alicia Coutts	Australia	58.21	
5	8	Rachael Kelly	England	58.61	
6	2	Jemma Lowe	Wales	58.63	
7	1	Audrey Lacroix	Canada	58.78	
8	7	Ellen Gandy	Australia	58.93	
