= Saint Helena at the 2018 Commonwealth Games =

- Flag of Saint Helena
- CG code: SHN
- CGA: National Sports Association of Saint Helena

in Gold Coast, Australia 4 April 2018 – 15 April 2018
- Competitors: 9 in 4 sports
- Flag bearer: Ben Dillon (opening)
- Medals: Gold 0 Silver 0 Bronze 0 Total 0

Commonwealth Games appearances (overview)
- 1982; 1986–1994; 1998; 2002; 2006; 2010; 2014; 2018; 2022; 2026; 2030

Saint Helena competed at the 2018 Commonwealth Games in the Gold Coast, Australia from April 4 to April 15, 2018.

The Saint Helena team consisted of nine athletes (all male) that competed in four sports.

Swimmer Ben Dillon was the island's flag bearer during the opening ceremony.

== Competitors ==
The following is the list of number of competitors participating at the Games per sport/discipline.

Sport	Men	Women	Total
Athletics (track and field)	1	0	1
Badminton	1	0	1
Shooting	2	0	2
Swimming	5	0	5
Total	9	0	9

== Athletics ==
Men
Track & road events

Athlete	Event	Heat		Semifinal		Final	
Athlete	Event	Result	Rank	Result	Rank	Result	Rank
Sean Crowie	100 m	10.84	6	did not advance			
Sean Crowie	200 m	DNS		did not advance			

== Badminton ==
Saint Helena participated with one athlete (one man).

Singles

Athlete	Event	Round of 64	Round of 32	Round of 16	Quarterfinal	Semifinal	Final / BM	
Athlete	Event	Opposition Score	Opposition Score	Opposition Score	Opposition Score	Opposition Score	Opposition Score	Rank
Vernon Smeed	Men's singles	Narayan Ramdhani (GUY); L 0 - 2	did not advance					

== Shooting ==
Saint Helena participated with two athletes (two men).

Men

Athlete	Event	Qualification		Final	
Athlete	Event	Points	Rank	Points	Rank
Simon Henry	50 metre rifle 3 positions	1112	15	did not advance	
Simon Henry	50 metre rifle prone	603.4	21	did not advance	
Carlos Yon	50 metre rifle 3 positions	1003	18	did not advance	
Carlos Yon	50 metre rifle prone	584.6	28	did not advance	

== Swimming ==
Saint Helena participated with five male swimmers.

Men

Athlete	Event	Heat		Semifinal		Final	
Athlete	Event	Time	Rank	Time	Rank	Time	Rank
Ben Dillon	50 m freestyle	26.28	56	did not advance			
Colby Thomas	50 m freestyle	27.88	59	did not advance			
Duwaine Yon	50 m freestyle	26.47	57	did not advance			
Ben Dillon	100 m freestyle	58.95	54	did not advance			
Colby Thomas	100 m freestyle	1:03.36	56	did not advance			
Duwaine Yon	100 m freestyle	1:00.47	55	did not advance			
Joshua Yon	50 m backstroke	34.30	19	did not advance			
Joshua Yon	100 m backstroke	1:13.01	24	did not advance			
Scott George	50 m breaststroke	40.58	34	did not advance			
Colby Thomas	50 m breaststroke	37.41	32	did not advance			
Duwaine Yon	50 m breaststroke	36.52	31	did not advance			
Scott George	100 m breaststroke	1:31.57	29	did not advance			
Colby Thomas	100 m breaststroke	1:22.77	28	did not advance			
Ben Dillon	50 m butterfly	29.71	54	did not advance			
Duwaine Yon; Joshua Yon; Colby Thomas; Ben Dillon	4 × 100 m freestyle relay	4:06.33	11	—N/a		did not advance	
