= Saint Helena at the 2026 Commonwealth Games =

- Flag of Saint Helena
- CG code: SHN
- CGA: National Sports Association of Saint Helena
- Website: nsash.org.sh

in Glasgow, Scotland 23 July 2026 – 2 August 2026
- Competitors: 7 in 2 sports
- Flag bearer: Sean Crowie
- Baton bearer: William Caswell
- Medals: Gold 0 Silver 0 Bronze 0 Total 0

Commonwealth Games appearances (overview)
- 1982; 1986–1994; 1998; 2002; 2006; 2010; 2014; 2018; 2022; 2026; 2030

Saint Helena competed at the 2026 Commonwealth Games in Glasgow, Scotland. This marked Saint Helena's ninth participation at the games, after making its debut at the 1982 Commonwealth Games.

The King's Baton relay stopped in Saint Helena in April 2026.

Saint Helena team consisted of seven athletes (all men), competing in two sports. The team was officially named in January 2026. Sprinter Sean Crowie was the country's opening ceremony flagbearer. Meanwhile, swimmer William Caswell was the baton bearer during the opening ceremony.

Saint Helena finished the games with no medals. The dependency is yet to win a Commonwealth Games medal.

== Competitors ==
The following is the list of number of competitors participating at the Games per sport/discipline.

Sport	Men	Women	Total
Athletics	4	0	4
Swimming	3	0	3
Total	7	0	7

== Athletics ==
Saint Helena entered four male athletes.

Key

Ranks given for track events are within the athlete's heat only.

- Q = Qualified for the next round
- q = Qualified for the next round as a fastest loser or, in field events, by position without achieving the qualifying target

Men
Track events

Athlete	Event	Round one		Semifinal		Final	
Athlete	Event	Result	Rank	Result	Rank	Result	Rank
Tyler Anthony	100 m	11.46	7	Did not advance			
Sean Crowie	100 m	10.61	5	Did not advance			
Tye Leo-Stroud	100 m	11.85	7	Did not advance			
Tyler Anthony	200 m	DQ		Did not advance			
Baze Baldwin	200 m	23.98 PB	6	Did not advance			
Sean Crowie	200 m	21.80 SB	5	Did not advance			
Tyler Anthony; Baze Baldwin; Sean Crowie; Tye Leo-Stroud	4 × 100 m relay	43.85 SB	7	—N/a		Did not advance	

== Swimming ==
Saint Helena entered three male swimmers.

Men

Athlete	Event	Heat		Semifinal		Final	
Athlete	Event	Time	Rank	Time	Rank	Time	Rank
William Caswell	50 m freestyle	26.22	57	Did not advance			
Nolan George	50 m freestyle	29.03	65	Did not advance			
Lucas Robertse	50 m freestyle	27.56	62	Did not advance			
William Caswell	100 m freestyle	58.46	57	Did not advance			
Nolan George	100 m freestyle	1:02.85	63	Did not advance			
Lucas Robertse	100 m freestyle	1:03.83	64	Did not advance			
William Caswell	200 m freestyle	2:09.21	36	—N/a		Did not advance	
Nolan George	200 m freestyle	2:21.77	40	—N/a		Did not advance	
William Caswell	400 m freestyle	4:38.43	27	—N/a		Did not advance	
William Caswell	800 m freestyle	—N/a				DNS	
Nolan George	50 m backstroke	38.10	40	Did not advance			
Lucas Robertse	50 m backstroke	34.62	37	Did not advance			
Nolan George	50 m breaststroke	37.10	54	Did not advance			
Lucas Robertse	50 m breaststroke	34.20	51	Did not advance			
Nolan George	100 m breaststroke	DNS					
William Caswell	50 m butterfly	28.50	59	Did not advance			
Nolan George	50 m butterfly	31.45	68	Did not advance			
