= Saint Helena at the 2022 Commonwealth Games =

- Flag of Saint Helena
- CG code: SHN
- CGA: National Sports Association of Saint Helena
- Website: nsash.org.sh

in Birmingham, England 28 July 2022 – 8 August 2022
- Competitors: 10 (7 men and 3 women) in 3 sports
- Medals: Gold 0 Silver 0 Bronze 0 Total 0

Commonwealth Games appearances (overview)
- 1982; 1986–1994; 1998; 2002; 2006; 2010; 2014; 2018; 2022; 2026; 2030

Saint Helena competed at the 2022 Commonwealth Games in Birmingham, England between 28 July and 8 August 2022. It was Saint Helena's eighth appearance at the Games.

== Competitors ==
The following is the list of number of competitors participating at the Games per sport/discipline.

Sport	Men	Women	Total
Athletics	2	0	2
Badminton	1	0	1
Swimming	4	3	7
Total	7	3	10

== Athletics ==
Two athletes were officially selected on 18 February 2022.

Men
Track and road events

Athlete	Event	Heat		Semifinal		Final	
Athlete	Event	Result	Rank	Result	Rank	Result	Rank
Sean Crowie	100 m	10.74	5	Did not advance			
Aiden Yon-Stevens	100 m	11.90	7	Did not advance			
Sean Crowie	200 m	21.94	6	Did not advance			
Aiden Yon-Stevens	200 m	23.70	8	Did not advance			

== Badminton ==
One player was officially selected on 18 February 2022.

Athlete	Event	Round of 64	Round of 32	Round of 16	Quarterfinal	Semifinal	Final / BM
Athlete	Event	Opposition Score	Opposition Score	Opposition Score	Opposition Score	Opposition Score	Rank
Vernon Smeed	Men's singles	Bye	Sen (IND); L 0 - 2	Did not advance			

== Swimming ==
Seven swimmers were officially selected on 18 February 2022.

Men

Athlete	Event	Heat		Semifinal		Final	
Athlete	Event	Time	Rank	Time	Rank	Time	Rank
William Caswell	50 m freestyle	27.80	68	Did not advance			
Stefan Thomas	50 m freestyle	Did not start		Did not advance			
Duwaine Yon	50 m freestyle	26.01	61	Did not advance			
William Caswell	100 m freestyle	1:01.74	67	Did not advance			
Stefan Thomas	100 m freestyle	58.98	65	Did not advance			
William Caswell	200 m freestyle	2:15.39	38	—N/a		Did not advance	
Stefan Thomas	200 m freestyle	2:12.70	37	—N/a		Did not advance	
Joshua Yon	50 m backstroke	33.37	45	Did not advance			
Joshua Yon	100 m backstroke	1:12.95	38	Did not advance			
Duwaine Yon	50 m breaststroke	Disqualified		Did not advance			
Stefan Thomas; William Caswell; Duwaine Yon; Joshua Yon	4 × 100 m freestyle relay	4:10.72	12	—N/a		Did not advance	

Women

Athlete	Event	Heat		Semifinal		Final	
Athlete	Event	Time	Rank	Time	Rank	Time	Rank
Vivienne Ponsford	50 m freestyle	31.22	65	Did not advance			
Vivienne Ponsford	100 m freestyle	1:09.31	55	Did not advance			
Poppy Davis-Coyle	200 m freestyle	2:26.18	28	—N/a		Did not advance	
Vivienne Ponsford	200 m freestyle	2:32.23	30	—N/a		Did not advance	
Poppy Davis-Coyle	400 m freestyle	5:09.83	22	—N/a		Did not advance	
Brooke Yon	50 m backstroke	34.19	33	Did not advance			
Poppy Davis-Coyle	100 m backstroke	1:17.90	28	Did not advance			
Poppy Davis-Coyle	200 m backstroke	2:48.18	14	—N/a		Did not advance	
Brooke Yon	50 m breaststroke	37.51	28	Did not advance			
Brooke Yon	100 m breaststroke	1:22.99	27	Did not advance			
Poppy Davis-Coyle	100 m butterfly	1:20.02	38	Did not advance			

Mixed

Athlete	Event	Heat		Final	
Athlete	Event	Time	Rank	Time	Rank
William Caswell; Stefan Thomas; Vivienne Ponsford; Poppy Davis-Coyle	4 × 100 m freestyle relay	4:20.58	18	Did not advance	
	4 × 100 m medley relay	Did not start		Did not advance	
