= Swimming at the 2018 Commonwealth Games – Men's 100 metre freestyle =

Men's 100 metre freestyle at the 2018 Commonwealth Games
- Venue: Gold Coast Aquatic Centre
- Dates: 7 April (heats, semifinals); 8 April (final)
- Competitors: 56 from 30 nations
- Winning time: 48.02

Medalists
gold medal	Duncan Scott	Scotland
silver medal	Chad le Clos	South Africa
silver medal	Kyle Chalmers	Australia

The men's 100 metre freestyle event at the 2018 Commonwealth Games was held on 7 and 8 April at the Gold Coast Aquatic Centre.

== Records ==
Prior to this competition, the existing world, Commonwealth and Games records were as follows:

World record	César Cielo (BRA)	46.91	Rome, Italy	30 July 2009
Commonwealth record	Cameron McEvoy (AUS)	47.04	Adelaide, Australia	11 April 2016
Games record	Brent Hayden (CAN)	47.98	Delhi, India	7 October 2010

== Results ==
=== Heats ===
The heats were held on 7 April at 11:37.

Rank	Heat	Lane	Name	Nationality	Time	Notes
1	8	5	Kyle Chalmers	Australia	48.81	Q
2	6	4	Jack Cartwright	Australia	48.85	Q
3	8	3	Dylan Carter	Trinidad and Tobago	48.96	Q
4	8	4	Duncan Scott	Scotland	48.99	Q
5	7	5	Yuri Kisil	Canada	49.06	Q
6	7	3	Matthew Abeysinghe	Sri Lanka	49.11	Q, NR
7	6	5	Chad le Clos	South Africa	49.17	Q
8	7	4	Cameron McEvoy	Australia	49.20	Q
9	6	3	Markus Thormeyer	Canada	49.41	Q
10	7	6	Calum Jarvis	Wales	49.65	Q
10	8	7	Daniel Hunter	New Zealand	49.65	Q
12	7	2	Jordan Sloan	Northern Ireland	49.72	Q
13	6	7	David Cumberlidge	England	49.77	Q
14	6	2	Matthew Stanley	New Zealand	49.79	Q
15	8	6	Jack Thorpe	Scotland	49.82	Q
16	6	6	Sam Perry	New Zealand	49.90	Q
17	5	4	Bradley Vincent	Mauritius	49.93	
18	7	7	Kieran McGuckin	Scotland	50.02	
19	7	1	Ruslan Gaziev	Canada	50.04	
20	6	8	Calvyn Justus	South Africa	50.06	
21	7	8	David Thompson	Northern Ireland	50.22	
22	5	2	Calum Bain	Northern Ireland	50.47	
23	6	1	Elliot Clogg	England	50.56	
24	5	3	Igor Mogne	Mozambique	50.74	
25	8	2	Darren Lim	Singapore	50.79	
26	8	1	Miles Munro	Guernsey	50.80	
27	5	5	Welson Sim	Malaysia	50.91	
28	5	6	Keith Kit Sern Lim	Malaysia	51.04	
29	4	4	Alex Sobers	Barbados	51.12	
30	5	8	Jean-Luc Zephir	Saint Lucia	51.66	
31	4	3	Mathieu Marquet	Mauritius	51.71	
32	5	1	Samuel Seghers	Papua New Guinea	51.94	
33	3	7	Brandon Schuster	Samoa	51.95	
34	8	8	Cherantha de Silva	Sri Lanka	52.08	
35	5	7	Kyle Abeysinghe	Sri Lanka	52.20	
36	4	6	Gregory Anodin	Mauritius	52.97	
37	4	7	Denilson da Costa	Mozambique	53.30	
38	2	6	Steven Maina	Kenya	53.53	
39	2	3	Paul Elaisa	Fiji	53.96	
40	3	4	Epeli Rabua Herbert	Fiji	54.02	
41	4	8	Syed Muhammad Haseeb Tariq	Pakistan	54.21	
42	3	6	Dean Hoffman	Seychelles	54.35	
43	3	3	Iain McCallum	Cayman Islands	54.56	
44	3	5	James Sanderson	Gibraltar	54.57	
45	2	1	Leonard Kalate	Papua New Guinea	54.91	
46	4	2	Stefano Mitchell	Antigua and Barbuda	54.95	
47	2	5	Jadon Wuilliez	Antigua and Barbuda	55.21	
48	2	4	Adam Moncherry	Seychelles	55.90	
49	3	8	Josh Tarere	Papua New Guinea	56.12	
50	3	1	Andrew Fowler	Guyana	56.33	
51	3	2	Temaruata Strickland	Cook Islands	57.33	
52	2	7	Alexander Cyrus	Saint Vincent and the Grenadines	57.56	
53	2	2	Nikolas Sylvester	Saint Vincent and the Grenadines	58.67	
54	1	3	Ben Dillon	Saint Helena	58.95	
55	1	4	Duwaine Yon	Saint Helena	1:00.47	
56	1	5	Colby Thomas	Saint Helena	1:03.36	
	4	1	Issa Mohamed	Kenya	DNS	
	4	5	N'Nhyn Fernander	Bahamas	DNS	

=== Semifinals ===
The semifinals were held on 7 April at 20:59.

==== Semifinal 1 ====
Rank	Lane	Name	Nationality	Time	Notes
1	6	Cameron McEvoy	Australia	48.50	Q
2	5	Duncan Scott	Scotland	48.72	Q
3	4	Jack Cartwright	Australia	48.73	Q
4	3	Matthew Abeysinghe	Sri Lanka	49.43	
5	1	Matthew Stanley	New Zealand	49.61	
6	2	Calum Jarvis	Wales	49.77	
7	8	Sam Perry	New Zealand	49.83	
8	7	Jordan Sloan	Northern Ireland	49.88	

==== Semifinal 2 ====
Rank	Lane	Name	Nationality	Time	Notes
1	6	Chad le Clos	South Africa	48.61	Q
2	4	Kyle Chalmers	Australia	48.70	Q
2	3	Yuri Kisil	Canada	48.79	Q
4	5	Dylan Carter	Trinidad and Tobago	49.06	Q
5	7	Daniel Hunter	New Zealand	49.11	Q
6	2	Markus Thormeyer	Canada	49.22	
7	8	Jack Thorpe	Scotland	49.75	
8	1	David Cumberlidge	England	49.90	

=== Final ===
The final was held on 8 April at 19:43.

Rank	Lane	Name	Nationality	Time	Notes
1st place, gold medalist(s)	6	Duncan Scott	Scotland	48.02	
2nd place, silver medalist(s)	5	Chad le Clos	South Africa	48.15	
2nd place, silver medalist(s)	3	Kyle Chalmers	Australia	48.15	
4	4	Cameron McEvoy	Australia	48.44	
5	1	Dylan Carter	Trinidad and Tobago	48.60	
6	2	Jack Cartwright	Australia	48.62	
7	7	Yuri Kisil	Canada	48.80	
8	8	Daniel Hunter	New Zealand	49.30	
