= Barbados at the 2022 Commonwealth Games =

- Flag of Barbados
- CG code: BAR
- CGA: Commonwealth Games Barbados
- Website: olympic.org.bb

in Birmingham, England 28 July 2022 – 8 August 2022
- Competitors: 64 (22 men and 42 women) in 12 sports
- Flag bearers: Matthew Wright; Latonia Blackman
- Medals Ranked =20th: Gold 1 Silver 1 Bronze 1 Total 3

Commonwealth Games appearances (overview)
- 1954; 1958; 1962; 1966; 1970; 1974; 1978; 1982; 1986; 1990; 1994; 1998; 2002; 2006; 2010; 2014; 2018; 2022; 2026; 2030

Barbados competed at the 2022 Commonwealth Games at Birmingham, England from 28 July – 8 August 2022. It was their 17th appearance at the Commonwealth Games, and their first since becoming a republic on 30 November 2021.

On 15 July 2022, a team of 65 athletes (23 men and 42 women) competing in 12 sports was named.

Matthew Wright and Latonia Blackman were the country's flagbearers during the opening ceremony.

== Medalists ==
Medal	Name	Sport	Event	Date
Gold	Sada Williams	Athletics	Women's 400 m	7 August
Silver	Shane Brathwaite	Athletics	Men's 110 m hurdles	4 August
Bronze	Jonathan Jones	Athletics	Men's 400 m	7 August

== Competitors ==
The following is the list of number of competitors participating at the Games per sport/discipline.

Sport	Men	Women	Total
Athletics	6	2	8
Badminton	2	2	4
Boxing	2	1	3
Cricket	—N/a	15	15
Cycling	1	1	2
Gymnastics	0	1	1
Judo	1	0	1
Netball	—N/a	12	12
Squash	2	3	5
Swimming	2	3	5
Table tennis	4	0	4
Triathlon	2	2	4
Total	22	42	64

== Athletics ==
A squad of nine athletes was officially announced on 15 July 2022.

Men
Track and road events

Athlete	Event	Heat		Semifinal		Final	
Athlete	Event	Result	Rank	Result	Rank	Result	Rank
Kyle Gale	400 m	46.66	4 q	46.78	5	Did not advance	
Jonathan Jones	400 m	45.39	1 Q	45.82	1 Q	44.89	3rd place, bronze medalist(s)
Shane Brathwaite	110 m hurdles	13.42	4 q	—N/a		13.30	2nd place, silver medalist(s)
Miguel Nicholas; Jonathan Jones; Rasheeme Griffith; Kyle Gale	4 × 400 m relay	3:07.23	4 q	—N/a		3:03.92	4

Field events

Athlete	Event	Final	
Athlete	Event	Distance	Rank
Nathan Crawford-Wallis	Triple jump	16.11	6

Women
Track and road events

Athlete	Event	Heat		Semifinal		Final	
Athlete	Event	Result	Rank	Result	Rank	Result	Rank
Sada Williams	400 m	51.66	1 Q	51.59	1 Q	49.90	1st place, gold medalist(s)
Hannah Connell	100 m hurdles	13.35	4	—N/a		Did not advance	

== Badminton ==
As of 1 June 2022, Barbados qualified for the mixed team event via the BWF World Rankings. Four players were officially announced on 15 July 2022.

Singles

Athlete	Event	Round of 64	Round of 32	Round of 16	Quarterfinal	Semifinal	Final / BM	
Athlete	Event	Opposition Score	Opposition Score	Opposition Score	Opposition Score	Opposition Score	Opposition Score	Rank
Kennie King	Men's singles	Wanagaliya (UGA); L (13–21, 10–21)	Did not advance					
Shae Martin	Men's singles	Bye	Karunaratne (SRI); L (6–21, 5–21)	Did not advance				
Sabrina Scott	Women's singles	Bye	Li (IOM); L (10–21, 15–21)	Did not advance				
Tamisha Williams	Women's singles	Williams (FLK); W (21–8, 21–10)	Leung (MRI); W (21–17, 10–21, 21–19)	Goh (MAS); L (Walkover)	Did not advance			

Doubles

Athlete	Event	Round of 64	Round of 32	Round of 16	Quarterfinal	Semifinal	Final / BM	
Athlete	Event	Opposition Score	Opposition Score	Opposition Score	Opposition Score	Opposition Score	Opposition Score	Rank
Shae Martin; Kennie King	Men's doubles	—N/a	Dias & Goonethilleka (SRI); L (12–21, 9–21)	Did not advance				
Tamisha Williams; Sabrina Scott	Women's doubles	—N/a	Cheah & Lai (MAS); L (5–21, 6–21)	Did not advance				
Kennie King; Tamisha Williams	Mixed doubles	Angus & Wynter (JAM); L (12–21, 19–21)	Did not advance					
Shae Martin; Sabrina Scott	Mixed doubles	Bye	Ellis & Smith (ENG); L (8–21, 8–21)	Did not advance				

Mixed team

Summary

Team	Event	Group stage				Quarterfinal	Semifinal	Final / BM	
Team	Event	Opposition Score	Opposition Score	Opposition Score	Rank	Opposition Score	Opposition Score	Opposition Score	Rank
Barbados	Mixed team	England; L 0–5	Singapore; L 0–5	Mauritius; L 1–4	4	Did not advance			

Squad

- Kennie King
- Shae Martin
- Tamisha Williams
- Sabrina Scott

Group stage

Pos	Team	Pld	W	L	MF	MA	MD	GF	GA	GD	PF	PA	PD	Pts	Qualification
1	Singapore	3	3	0	14	1	+13	29	2	+27	639	301	+338	3	Knockout stage
2	England	3	2	1	11	4	+7	22	9	+13	577	367	+210	2	Knockout stage
3	Mauritius	3	1	2	4	11	−7	9	22	−13	386	583	−197	1	
4	Barbados	3	0	3	1	14	−13	2	29	−27	296	647	−351	0	

Source: BWF

England
5
National Exhibition Centre, Court 1
29 July 2022, 09:00 UTC+1

Barbados
0

			1	2	3
1	(England) (Barbados)	Marcus Ellis / Lauren Smith; Shae Martin / Sabrina Scott	21; 5	21; 9
2	(England) (Barbados)	Toby Penty; Kennie Maarten King	21; 5	21; 9
3	(England) (Barbados)	Freya Patel-Redfearn; Tamisha Williams	21; 6	21; 3
4	(England) (Barbados)	Ben Lane / Sean Vendy; Kennie Maarten King / Shae Martin	21; 5	21; 10
5	(England) (Barbados)	Chloe Birch / Jessica Pugh; Sabrina Scott / Tamisha Williams	21; 6	21; 9

Singapore
5
National Exhibition Centre, Court 3
29 July 2022, 19:00 UTC+1

Barbados
0

			1	2	3
1	(Singapore) (Barbados)	Terry Hee / Tan Wei Han; Shae Martin / Tamisha Williams	21; 5	21; 10
2	(Singapore) (Barbados)	Jason Teh; Kennie Maarten King	21; 9	21; 7
3	(Singapore) (Barbados)	Insyirah Khan; Sabrina Scott	21; 1	21; 4
4	(Singapore) (Barbados)	Loh Kean Hean / Andy Kwek; Kennie Maarten King / Shae Martin	21; 6	21; 10
5	(Singapore) (Barbados)	Crystal Wong / Jin Yujia; Tamisha Williams / Sabrina Scott	21; 5	21; 9

Mauritius
4
National Exhibition Centre, Court 4
30 July 2022, 14:00 UTC+1

Barbados
1

			1	2	3
1	(Mauritius) (Barbados)	Tejraj Pultoo / Kobita Dookhee; Shae Martin / Sabrina Scott	17; 21	21; 16	19; 21
2	(Mauritius) (Barbados)	Alexandre Bongout; Kennie Maarten King	23; 21	21; 18
3	(Mauritius) (Barbados)	Aatish Lubah / Julien Paul; Kennie Maarten King / Shae Martin	21; 6	21; 15
4	(Mauritius) (Barbados)	Lorna Bodha; Tamisha Williams	21; 11	21; 12
5	(Mauritius) (Barbados)	Lorna Bodha / Kobita Dookhee; Sabrina Scott / Tamisha Williams	21; 14	21; 8

== Boxing ==
A squad of three boxers was officially announced on 15 July 2022.

Athlete	Event	Round of 32	Round of 16	Quarterfinals	Semifinals	Final	
Athlete	Event	Opposition Result	Opposition Result	Opposition Result	Opposition Result	Opposition Result	Rank
Jabali Breedy	Men's Bantamweight	—N/a	McHale (SCO); L 2-3	Did not advance			
Charles Cox	Men's Light heavyweight	Bye	Beausejour (CAN); L 0-5	Did not advance			
Kimberly Gittens	Women's Light middleweight	—N/a	Essiane (CMR); L 0-5	Did not advance			

== Cricket ==
By virtue of their position in the ICC Women's T20I rankings (as of 1 April 2021), the West Indies qualified for the tournament; their status as a multinational Caribbean team meant the associated quota had to be awarded to one of the associated countries. Following the cancellation of the 2021 Twenty20 Blaze tournament (the intended qualifier), Cricket West Indies declared the quota would go to Barbados, the reigning Twenty20 Blaze champions from 2018–19.

Fixtures were announced in November 2021.

Summary

Team	Event	Group stage				Semifinal	Final / BM	
Team	Event	Opposition Result	Opposition Result	Opposition Result	Rank	Opposition Result	Opposition Result	Rank
Barbados women	Women's tournament	Pakistan; W by 15 runs	Australia; L by 9 wickets	India; L by 100 runs	3	Did not advance		

Roster

Fifteen players were officially selected on 15 July 2022.

- Hayley Matthews (c)
- Aaliyah Alleyne
- Shanika Bruce
- Shai Carrington
- Shaunte Carrington
- Shamilia Connell
- Deandra Dottin
- Keila Elliott
- Trishan Holder
- Kycia Knight
- Kyshona Knight
- Alisa Scantlebury
- Shakera Selman
- Tiffany Thorpe
- Aaliyah Williams

Group play

Pos	Team	Pld	W	L	NR	Pts	NRR
1	Australia	3	3	0	0	6	2.832
2	India	3	2	1	0	4	2.511
3	Barbados	3	1	2	0	2	−2.953
4	Pakistan	3	0	3	0	0	−1.768

Source: ESPNcricinfo

29 July 2022
18:00 (D/N)
Scorecard

Barbados; 144/4 (20 overs)	v	Pakistan; 129/6 (20 overs)
Kycia Knight 62* (56); Fatima Sana 2/41 (4 overs)		Nida Dar 50* (31); Hayley Matthews 1/13 (4 overs)

Barbados won by 15 runs
Edgbaston, Birmingham
Umpires: Kim Cotton (NZ) and Shivani Mishra (Qat)
Player of the match: Hayley Matthews (Bar)

- Pakistan won the toss and elected to field.
- Shanika Bruce, Trishan Holder, Alisa Scantlebury and Aaliyah Williams (Bar) all made their WT20I debuts. (Note: Aaliyah Alleyne, Shamilia Connell, Deandra Dottin, Kycia Knight, Kyshona Knight, Hayley Matthews and Shakera Selman – all capped in WT20Is for the West Indies – also made their WT20I debuts for Barbados.)

31 July 2022
18:00 (D/N)
Scorecard

Barbados; 64 (20 overs)	v	Australia; 68/1 (8.1 overs)
Hayley Matthews 18 (13); Alana King 4/8 (4 overs)		Meg Lanning 36* (21); Shanika Bruce 1/7 (2 overs)

Australia won by 9 wickets
Edgbaston, Birmingham
Umpires: Shivani Mishra (Qat) and Sue Redfern (Eng)
Player of the match: Alana King (Aus)

- Australia won the toss and elected to field.
- Keila Elliott (Bar) made her WT20I debut.

3 August 2022
18:00 (D/N)
Scorecard

India; 162/4 (20 overs)	v	Barbados; 62/8 (20 overs)
Jemimah Rodrigues 56* (46); Shanika Bruce 1/17 (2 overs)		Kyshona Knight 16 (20); Renuka Singh Thakur 4/10 (4 overs)

India won by 100 runs
Edgbaston, Birmingham
Umpires: Kim Cotton (NZ) and Shivani Mishra (Qat)
Player of the match: Renuka Singh Thakur (Ind)

- Barbados won the toss and elected to field.
- Shaunte Carrington (Bar) made her WT20I debut.

== Cycling ==
A squad of two cyclists was officially announced on 15 July 2022.

=== Track ===
Sprint

Athlete	Event	Qualification		Round 1	Quarterfinals	Semifinals	Final	
Athlete	Event	Time	Rank	Opposition Time	Opposition Time	Opposition Time	Opposition Time	Rank
Amber Joseph	Women's sprint	Did not start		Did not advance				

Points race

Athlete	Event	Final	
Athlete	Event	Points	Rank
Jamol Eastmond	Men's point race	DNF	
Amber Joseph	Women's points race	-20	17

Scratch race

Athlete	Event	Qualification	Final
Jamol Eastmond	Men's scratch race	9 Q	DNF
Amber Joseph	Women's scratch race	—N/a	9

== Gymnastics ==
One gymnast was officially announced on 15 July 2022.

=== Artistic ===
Women
Individual Qualification

Athlete	Event	Apparatus				Total	Rank
Athlete	Event	V	UB	BB	F	Total	Rank
Erin Pinder	Qualification	12.150	7.500	6.800	8.350	34.800	28

== Judo ==
One judoka was officially announced on 15 July 2022.

Athlete	Event	Round of 16	Quarterfinals	Semifinals	Repechage	Final/BM	
Athlete	Event	Opposition Result	Opposition Result	Opposition Result	Opposition Result	Opposition Result	Rank
Asa Weithers	Men's -81 kg	Jones (TTO); W 10 - 00	G-Drapeau (CAN); L 00 - 10	Did not advance	Kosam (NRU); W 10 - 00	Elnahas (CAN); L 00 - 10	5

== Netball ==
By virtue of its position in the World Netball Rankings (as of 31 January 2022), Barbados qualified for the tournament.

Complete fixtures were announced in March 2022.

Summary

Team	Event	Group stage						Semifinal	Final / BM / Cl.	
Team	Event	Opposition Result	Opposition Result	Opposition Result	Opposition Result	Opposition Result	Rank	Opposition Result	Opposition Result	Rank
Barbados women	Women's tournament	Australia; L 18 - 95	South Africa; L 36 - 91	Jamaica; L 24 - 103	Scotland; L 28 - 72	Wales; L 44 - 60	6	Did not advance	11th place match Trinidad and Tobago; L 31 - 63	12

Roster

Twelve players were selected on 11 July 2022.

- Latonia Blackman (co-c)
- Shonette Azore-Bruce (co-c)
- Faye Agard
- Vanessa Bobb
- Samantha Browne
- Brianna Holder
- Zakiya Kirton
- Tonisha Rock-Yaw
- Stephian Shepherd
- Akeena Stoute
- Sabreena Smith
- Shonica Wharton

Group play

Pos	Team	Pld	W	D	L	GF	GA	GD	Pts	Qualification
1	Jamaica	5	5	0	0	378	205	+173	10	Semi-finals
2	Australia	5	4	0	1	386	187	+199	8	Semi-finals
3	South Africa	5	3	0	2	323	275	+48	6	Classification matches
4	Wales	5	2	0	3	235	306	−71	4	Classification matches
5	Scotland	5	1	0	4	224	302	−78	2	Classification matches
6	Barbados	5	0	0	5	150	421	−271	0	Classification matches

Source: Birmingham 2022

29 July 2022; 14:00	Report	Australia	95–18	Barbados	National Exhibition Centre; Umpires: Gary Burgess; Alison Harrison
29 July 2022; 14:00	Report	Austin 6/6 (100%); Bueta 44/48 (92%); Koenen 35/38 (92%); Wood 10/15 (67%)		Agard 4/7 (57%); Blackman 6/8 (75%); Holder 2/3 (67%); Wharton 6/13 (46%)	National Exhibition Centre; Umpires: Gary Burgess; Alison Harrison

31 July 2022; 14:00	Report	South Africa	91–36	Barbados	National Exhibition Centre; Umpires: Gareth Fowler; Bronwen Adams
31 July 2022; 14:00	Report	Rademan 12/16 (75%); Taljaard 18/20 (90%) van der Berg 47/49 (96%); Venter 14/16 (88%)		Blackman 21/24 (88%); Wharton 15/21 (71%)	National Exhibition Centre; Umpires: Gareth Fowler; Bronwen Adams

1 August 2022; 14:00	Report	Jamaica	103–24	Barbados	National Exhibition Centre; Umpires: Elizna Van Den Berg; Anso Kemp
1 August 2022; 14:00	Report	Beckford 12/13 (92%); Fowler 24/27 (89%); Nelson 58/60 (97%); Robison 9/9 (100%)		Agard 10/12 (83%); Blackman 3/3 (100%); Holder 1/3 (33%); Wharton 10/15 (67%)	National Exhibition Centre; Umpires: Elizna Van Den Berg; Anso Kemp

3 August 2022; 18:00	Report	Scotland	72–28	Barbados	National Exhibition Centre; Umpires: Tara Warner; Kate Wright
3 August 2022; 18:00	Report	Barrie 20/25 (80%); Goodwin 30/34 (88%); McCall 22/25 (88%)		Agard 19/23 (83%); Holder 4/6 (67%); Wharton 5/8 (63%)	National Exhibition Centre; Umpires: Tara Warner; Kate Wright

4 August 2022; 11:00	Report	Wales	60–44	Barbados	National Exhibition Centre; Umpires: Louise Travis; Elizna Van Den Berg
4 August 2022; 11:00	Report	Creak 30/33 (91%); Roberts 9/14 (64%); Rowe 21/24 (88%)		Agard 4/5 (80%); Blackman 19/19 (100%); Wharton 21/27 (78%)	National Exhibition Centre; Umpires: Louise Travis; Elizna Van Den Berg

Eleventh place match

5 August 2022; 09:00	Report	Barbados	31–63	Trinidad and Tobago	National Exhibition Centre; Umpires: Tracy-Ann Griffiths; Anso Kemp
5 August 2022; 09:00	Report	Agard 14/19 (74%); Blackman 9/10 (90%); Holder 1/1 (100%); Wharton 7/11 (64%)		Cooper 25/31 (81%); Noel 38/43 (88%)	National Exhibition Centre; Umpires: Tracy-Ann Griffiths; Anso Kemp

== Squash ==
A squad of five players was officially announced on 15 July 2022.

Singles

Athlete	Event	Round of 64	Round of 32	Round of 16	Quarterfinals	Semifinals	Final	
Athlete	Event	Opposition Score	Opposition Score	Opposition Score	Opposition Score	Opposition Score	Opposition Score	Rank
Khamal Cumberbatch	Men's singles	Yuen (MAS); L 0 - 3	Did not advance					
Shawn Simpson	Men's singles	Wakeel (SRI); L 2 - 3	Did not advance					
Meagan Best	Women's singles	Nimji (KEN); W 3 - 0	Chinappa (IND); L 0 - 3	Did not advance				
Amanda Haywood	Women's singles	Neo Phatsima (BOT); W 3 - 0	Evans (WAL); L 0 - 3	Did not advance				
Jada Smith-Padmore	Women's singles	Pitcairn (CAY); L 0 - 3	Did not advance					

Doubles

Athlete	Event	Round of 32	Round of 16	Quarterfinals	Semifinals	Final	
Athlete	Event	Opposition Score	Opposition Score	Opposition Score	Opposition Score	Opposition Score	Rank
Shawn Simpson; Khamal Cumberbatch	Men's doubles	Kamal / Ong (MAS); L 0 - 2	Did not advance				
Meagan Best; Amanda Haywood	Women's doubles	Sultana / Sultana (MLT); W 2 - 1	Chinappa / Pallikall (IND); L 0 - 2	Did not advance			
Shawn Simpson; Amanda Haywood	Mixed doubles	Adderley / Stewart (SCO); L 0 - 2	Did not advance				
Meagan Best; Khamal Cumberbatch	Mixed doubles	Fayyaz / Aslam (PAK); W 2 - 0	Waters / Waller (ENG); L 0 - 2	Did not advance			

== Swimming ==
A squad of five swimmers was officially announced on 15 July 2022.

Men

Athlete	Event	Heat		Semifinal		Final	
Athlete	Event	Time	Rank	Time	Rank	Time	Rank
Jack Kirby	50 m freestyle	23.59	22	Did not advance			
Jack Kirby	50 m backstroke	26.10	19	Did not advance			
Jack Kirby	100 m backstroke	56.55	18	Did not advance			
Luis Sebastian Weekes	50 m breaststroke	29.40	25	Did not advance			
Luis Sebastian Weekes	100 m breaststroke	1:04.96	25	Did not advance			
Luis Sebastian Weekes	200 m breaststroke	2:22.71	13	—N/a		Did not advance	

Women

Athlete	Event	Heat		Semifinal		Final	
Athlete	Event	Time	Rank	Time	Rank	Time	Rank
Danielle Treasure	200 m freestyle	2:10.17	20	—N/a		Did not advance	
Danielle Titus	50 m backstroke	30.13	17 R	30.00	15	Did not advance	
Danielle Treasure	50 m backstroke	32.76	26	Did not advance			
Danielle Titus	100 m backstroke	1:04.18	16 Q	1:05.24	16	Did not advance	
Danielle Treasure	100 m backstroke	1:09.08	22	Did not advance			
Danielle Titus	200 m backstroke	2:19.35	9	—N/a		Did not advance	
Danielle Treasure	200 m backstroke	2:26.72	11	—N/a		Did not advance	
Adara Stoddard	200 m breaststroke	2:46.15	12	—N/a		Did not advance	
Adara Stoddard	200 m individual medley	2:34.33	13	—N/a		Did not advance	
Adara Stoddard	400 m individual medley	5:24.94	10	—N/a		Did not advance	

Mixed

Athlete	Event	Heat		Final	
Athlete	Event	Time	Rank	Time	Rank
Jack Kirby; Luis Sebastian Weekes; Danielle Treasure; Adara Stoddard	4 × 100 m freestyle relay	3:52.46	14	Did not advance	
Danielle Titus; Luis Sebastian Weekes; Adara Stoddard; Jack Kirby	4 × 100 m medley relay	4:08.59	10	Did not advance	

== Table tennis ==
Barbados qualified a men's team for the table tennis competition. Four players were officially announced on 15 July 2022.

Singles

Athletes	Event	Group stage			Round of 32	Round of 16	Quarterfinal	Semifinal	Final / BM	
Athletes	Event	Opposition Score	Opposition Score	Rank	Opposition Score	Opposition Score	Opposition Score	Opposition Score	Opposition Score	Rank
Kevin Farley	Men's singles	Nathoo (RSA); W 4 - 3	Reilly (FIJ); W 4 - 0	1 Q	Walker (ENG); L 0 - 4	Did not advance				
Tyrese Knight	Men's singles	Loi (PNG); W 4 - 0	Wong (MAS); L 0 - 4	2	Did not advance					
Ramon Maxwell	Men's singles	Yogarajah (MRI); L 0 - 4	Mutua (KEN); L 1 - 4	3	Did not advance					

Doubles

Athletes	Event	Round of 64	Round of 32	Round of 16	Quarterfinal	Semifinal	Final / BM	
Athletes	Event	Opposition Score	Opposition Score	Opposition Score	Opposition Score	Opposition Score	Opposition Score	Rank
Tre Riley; Kevin Farley	Men's doubles	Bye	Jarvis / Walker (ENG); L 0 - 3	Did not advance				
Tyrese Knight; Ramon Maxwell	Men's doubles	Bye	Jones / Steyn (RSA); W 3 - 1	Pitchford / Drinkhall (ENG); L 0 - 3	Did not advance			

Team

Athletes	Event	Group stage				Quarterfinal	Semifinal	Final	Rank
Athletes	Event	Opposition Score	Opposition Score	Opposition Score	Rank	Opposition Score	Opposition Score	Opposition Score	Rank
Tre Riley; Tyrese Knight; Ramon Maxwell; Kevin Farley	Men's team	India(IND); L 0-3	Northern Ireland(NIR); L 0-3	Singapore(SGP); L 0-3	4	Did not advance			

== Triathlon ==
A squad of four triathletes was officially selected on 15 July 2022.

Individual

Athlete	Event	Swim (750 m)	Trans 1	Bike (20 km)	Trans 2	Run (5 km)	Total	Rank
Matthew Wright	Men's	8:52	0:51	26:05	0:22	17:11	53:21	17

Mixed Relay

Athletes	Event	Total Times per Athlete (Swim 250 m, Bike 7 km, Run 1.5 km)	Total Group Time	Rank
Matthew Wright; Zahra Gaskin; Niel Skinner; Chara Hinds	Mixed relay	18:22; 27:25; 23:29; 27:04	1:36:20	12
