= Barbados at the 2006 Commonwealth Games =

- CGF code: BAR
- CGA: Barbados Olympic Association
- Website: olympic.org.bb

in Melbourne, Australia
- Competitors: 21
- Flag bearers: Opening: Closing:
- Medals: Gold 0 Silver 0 Bronze 1 Total 1

Commonwealth Games appearances (overview)
- 1954; 1958; 1962; 1966; 1970; 1974; 1978; 1982; 1986; 1990; 1994; 1998; 2002; 2006; 2010; 2014; 2018; 2022; 2026; 2030

Barbados was represented at the 2006 Commonwealth Games in Melbourne.

== Medals ==
	(gold)	(silver)	(bronze)	Total
Barbados	0	0	1	1

=== Bronze ===
- Anderson Fitzgerald Emmanuel, Boxing, Heavyweight 91 kg

== Competitions ==
=== Women's field Hockey ===
- Lana Als
- Ann-Marie Alleyne
- Dionne Clarke
- Joana Davis
- Chiaka Drakes
- Deborah-Ann Holder
- Maria Browne
- Reyna Farnum
- Tricia-Ann Greaves
- Patrina Braithwaite
- Allison Haynes
- Cher King
- Lisa Crichlow
- Charlia Warner
- Nicole Tempro
- Tara Howard

=== Netball ===
Barbados finished 10th in the netball at the 2006 Commonwealth Games. In the 9th/10th playoff, they lost 69–45 to Fiji.

Pool 2

Saturday 18 March; 18:30 (UTC+11)	Stats	Jamaica	69–30	Barbados	Umpires: Bobbi Brown; Sharon Kelly; Reserve umpire: Stacey Campton
Saturday 18 March; 18:30 (UTC+11)	Stats	Scoring by quarter: 22-5, 18-5, 15-9, 14-11			Umpires: Bobbi Brown; Sharon Kelly; Reserve umpire: Stacey Campton
Saturday 18 March; 18:30 (UTC+11)	Stats	Latoya Thomas 25/32 (78%); Elaine Davis 22/28 (79%); Simone Forbes 22/30 (73%)		Lydia Bishop 18/26 (69%); Laurel Browne 12/18 (67%)	Umpires: Bobbi Brown; Sharon Kelly; Reserve umpire: Stacey Campton

Sunday 19 March; 13:00 (UTC+11)	Report; Stats	Australia	70–27	Barbados	Umpires: Bronwyn Meek; Bill Alexander; Reserve umpire: Bobbi Brown
Sunday 19 March; 13:00 (UTC+11)	Report; Stats	Scoring by quarter: 22-6, 16-6, 15-10, 17-5			Umpires: Bronwyn Meek; Bill Alexander; Reserve umpire: Bobbi Brown
Sunday 19 March; 13:00 (UTC+11)	Report; Stats	Catherine Cox 30/37 (81%); Susan Pratley 20/21 (95%); Sharelle McMahon 15/17 (88%); Megan Dehn 5/9 (56%)		Lydia Bishop 14/23 (61%); Laurel Browne 13/15 (87%)	Umpires: Bronwyn Meek; Bill Alexander; Reserve umpire: Bobbi Brown

Monday 20 March; 20:30 (UTC+11)	Stats	Barbados	51–40	Singapore	Umpires: Bronwyn Meek; Michelle Phippard; Reserve umpire: Bill Alexander
Monday 20 March; 20:30 (UTC+11)	Stats	Scoring by quarter: 7-14, 15-9, 17-8, 12-9			Umpires: Bronwyn Meek; Michelle Phippard; Reserve umpire: Bill Alexander
Monday 20 March; 20:30 (UTC+11)	Stats	Laurel Browne 37/40 (93%); Lydia Bishop 14/20 (70%)		Tan Hui Yan 22/32 (69%); Li Ling 14/19 (74%); Jeanine Heng Wei Ping 4/7 (57%)	Umpires: Bronwyn Meek; Michelle Phippard; Reserve umpire: Bill Alexander

Wednesday 22 March; 13:00 (UTC+11)	Stats	Samoa	45–41	Barbados	Umpires: Stacey Campton; Pauline Sciascia; Reserve umpire: Carolene Logan
Wednesday 22 March; 13:00 (UTC+11)	Stats	Scoring by quarter: 13-9, 13-7, 12-14, 8-11			Umpires: Stacey Campton; Pauline Sciascia; Reserve umpire: Carolene Logan
Wednesday 22 March; 13:00 (UTC+11)	Stats	Monika Fuimaono 28/41 (68%); Malu Fa'asavalu 17/23 (74%)		Lydia Bishop 27/33 (82%); Latonia Blackman 7/8 (88%); Laurel Browne 7/11 (64%)	Umpires: Stacey Campton; Pauline Sciascia; Reserve umpire: Carolene Logan

Thursday 23 March; 09:00 (UTC+11)	Stats	Barbados	34–55	Wales	Umpires: Jacqui Jashari; Sharon Kelly; Reserve umpire: Chris Campbell
Thursday 23 March; 09:00 (UTC+11)	Stats	Scoring by quarter: 8-15, 8-13, 9-13, 9-14			Umpires: Jacqui Jashari; Sharon Kelly; Reserve umpire: Chris Campbell
Thursday 23 March; 09:00 (UTC+11)	Stats	Lydia Bishop 21/24 (88%); Latonia Blackman 8/15 (53%); Laurel Browne 5/5 (100%)		Rebecca James 38/43 (88%); Rhiannon Ace 17/28 (61%)	Umpires: Jacqui Jashari; Sharon Kelly; Reserve umpire: Chris Campbell

Table

Pos	Team	P	W	D	L	GF	GA	GD	Pts
1	Australia	5	4	1	0	387	169	+218	9
2	Jamaica	5	4	1	0	324	174	+150	9
3	Samoa	5	3	0	2	264	254	+10	6
4	Wales	5	2	0	3	185	271	-86	4
5	Barbados	5	2	0	3	183	279	-96	4
6	Singapore	5	0	0	5	150	346	-196	0

Qualified for Semi-finals
Qualified for Classification

9th/10th playoff

Friday 24 March; 18:30 (UTC+11)	Report; Stats	Fiji	69–45	Barbados	Umpires: Amanda Nottingham; Jacqui Jashari; Reserve umpire: Bill Alexander
Friday 24 March; 18:30 (UTC+11)	Report; Stats	Scoring by quarter: 17-10, 17-6, 18-15, 17-14			Umpires: Amanda Nottingham; Jacqui Jashari; Reserve umpire: Bill Alexander
Friday 24 March; 18:30 (UTC+11)	Report; Stats	Taraima Rara 50/55 (91%); Matelita Shaw 19/24 (79%)		Lydia Bishop 24/31 (77%); Wanda Agard-Belgrave 16/20 (80%); Laurel Browne 4/5 (80%); Denise Alleyne 1/1 (100%)	Umpires: Amanda Nottingham; Jacqui Jashari; Reserve umpire: Bill Alexander

Squad

Barbados roster
Players
Coaches

Pos.	Name	Age - DOB	Ht.	Club	Club nat.
Wanda Agard-Belgrave	GK	8 December 1978 (aged 27)	1.85 m (6 ft 1 in)	Advil Rockers
Denese Alleyne (vc)	GA, GS	24 June 1976 (aged 29)	1.78 m (5 ft 10 in)	St Barnabas
Lydia Bishop	GS, GA	1 August 1974 (aged 31)	1.75 m (5 ft 9 in)	Spooners Hill
Latonia Blackman	WD, GD, GK	6 October 1982 (aged 23)	1.77 m (5 ft 10 in)	Pride of Villa
Jacqueline Browne	GD	25 May 1969 (aged 36)	1.78 m (5 ft 10 in)	St Barnabas
Laurel Browne	GS, GK	2 August 1976 (aged 29)	1.89 m (6 ft 2 in)	Silver Raiders
Samantha Browne	WD	3 July 1989 (aged 16)	1.72 m (5 ft 8 in)	St Barnabas
Alicia Harding	WD, GD, GK	20 December 1984 (aged 21)	1.73 m (5 ft 8 in)	St Barnabas
Irecka Louis	WD	30 July 1981 (aged 24)	1.72 m (5 ft 8 in)	Advil Rockers
Julie Phillips (c)	WA, WD	17 December 1972 (aged 33)	1.72 m (5 ft 8 in)	St. Barnabas
Janelle Sealy	GD	19 February 1985 (aged 21)	1.69 m (5 ft 7 in)	UWI Eagles
Chekirah Shepherd	WA, C	26 September 1987 (aged 18)	1.75 m (5 ft 9 in)	Banks Spurs

Head coach

- Anna Shepherd

Assistant coach

- Maureen Bourne

Manager:
Vaneisha Cadogan
Team Doctor:
Llewyn Harper

Notes

- (c) – Captain
- (cc) – Co-captain
- (vc) – Vice-captain
- – Injury / maternity leave
- (TRP) – Temporary Replacement Player

=== Swimming ===
- Bradley Ally
- Andrei Cross
- Alexis Jordan
- Nicholas Neckles
