= Swimming at the 2022 Commonwealth Games – Women's 50 metre backstroke =

Women's 50 metre backstroke at the 2022 Commonwealth Games
- Venue: Sandwell Aquatics Centre
- Dates: 2 August (heats, semifinals); 3 August (final)
- Competitors: 38 from 27 nations
- Winning time: 27.31

Medalists
gold medal	Kylie Masse	Canada
silver medal	Mollie O'Callaghan	Australia
bronze medal	Kaylee McKeown	Australia

The women's 50 metre backstroke event at the 2022 Commonwealth Games was held on 2 and 3 August at the Sandwell Aquatics Centre.

== Records ==
Prior to this competition, the existing world, Commonwealth and Games records were as follows:

World record	Liu Xiang (CHN)	26.98	Jakarta, Indonesia	21 August 2018
Commonwealth record	Kaylee McKeown (AUS)	27.16	Sydney, Australia	16 May 2021
Games record	Georgia Davies (WAL)	27.56	Glasgow, United Kingdom	29 July 2014

The following records were established during the competition:

Date	Event	Name	Nationality	Time	Record
2 August	Semifinal 2	Kylie Masse	Canada	27.47	GR
3 August	Final	Kylie Masse	Canada	27.31	GR

== Schedule ==
The schedule is as follows:

All times are British Summer Time (UTC+1)

Date	Time	Round
Tuesday 2 August 2022	11:08	Qualifying
Tuesday 2 August 2022	20:34	Semifinals
Wednesday 3 August 2022	19:51	Final

== Results ==
=== Heats ===
Rank	Heat	Lane	Name	Nationality	Time	Notes
1	4	4	Kylie Masse	Canada	27.57	Q
2	4	5	Bronte Job	Australia	27.65	Q
3	5	5	Medi Harris	Wales	28.03	Q
4	5	4	Kaylee McKeown	Australia	28.09	Q
5	3	4	Mollie O'Callaghan	Australia	28.13	Q
6	3	5	Lauren Cox	England	28.30	Q
7	4	3	Danielle Hil	Northern Ireland	28.32	Q
8	5	6	Olivia Nel	South Africa	28.79	Q
9	3	3	Hazel Ouwehand	New Zealand	29.05	Q
10	5	3	Cassie Wild	Scotland	29.19	WD
11	4	2	Maddy Moore	Bermuda	29.29	Q
12	5	2	Emma Harvey	Bermuda	29.38	Q
13	4	6	Rebecca Meder	South Africa	29.55	Q
14	5	1	Gemma Atherley	Jersey	29.93	Q
15	3	6	Isabella Hindley	England	29.99	Q
16	4	7	Tatiana Tostevin	Guernsey	30.06	Q
17	3	2	Danielle Titus	Barbados	30.13	R, W
18	4	8	Emma Hodgson	Isle of Man	30.25	R
19	3	7	Lushavel Stickland	Samoa	30.46	
20	5	7	Grace Davison	Northern Ireland	30.49	
21	3	1	Nubia Adjei	Ghana	30.97	
22	2	4	Mollie McAlorum	Northern Ireland	31.77	
23	3	8	Aaliyah Palestrini	Seychelles	32.02	
24	4	1	Katelyn Cabral	Bahamas	32.27	
25	2	2	Cheyenne Rova	Fiji	32.34	
26	2	6	Danielle Treasure	Barbados	32.76	
27	2	5	Therese Soukup	Seychelles	32.95	
28	1	2	Tilly Collymore	Grenada	33.25	
29	2	7	Avice Meya	Uganda	33.71	
30	1	6	Kiera Prentice	Isle of Man	33.86	
31	2	1	Jamie Joachim	Saint Vincent and the Grenadines	33.90	
32	2	8	Patrice Mahaica	Guyana	34.06	
33	1	5	Brooke Yon	Saint Helena	34.19	
34	2	3	Arleigha Hall	Turks and Caicos Islands	34.20	
35	1	3	Hamna Ahmed	Maldives	34.51	
36	1	4	Aishath Sausan	Maldives	34.76	
37	1	7	Kayla Temba	Tanzania	39.76	
38	1	1	Kanu Isha	Sierra Leone	44.57	
	5	8	Maggie Mac Neil	Canada	DNS	

=== Semifinals ===
Rank	Heat	Lane	Name	Nationality	Time	Notes
1	2	4	Kylie Masse	Canada	27.47	Q, GR
2	2	5	Medi Harris	Wales	27.64	Q
3	1	5	Kaylee McKeown	Australia	27.75	Q
4	2	3	Mollie O'Callaghan	Australia	27.76	Q
5	1	4	Bronte Job	Australia	27.79	Q
6	1	3	Lauren Cox	England	27.91	Q
7	2	6	Danielle Hil	Northern Ireland	28.28	Q
8	1	7	Rebecca Meder	South Africa	28.69	Q
9	1	6	Olivia Nel	South Africa	28.73	R
10	2	2	Hazel Ouwehand	New Zealand	28.85	R
11	1	2	Maddy Moore	Bermuda	29.18	NR
12	2	7	Emma Harvey	Bermuda	29.27	
13	1	1	Isabella Hindley	England	29.75	
14	2	8	Tatiana Tostevin	Guernsey	29.90	
15	1	8	Danielle Titus	Barbados	30.00	
16	2	1	Gemma Atherley	Jersey	30.06	

=== Final ===
Rank	Lane	Name	Nationality	Time	Notes
1st place, gold medalist(s)	4	Kylie Masse	Canada	27.31	GR
2nd place, silver medalist(s)	6	Mollie O'Callaghan	Australia	27.47	
3rd place, bronze medalist(s)	3	Kaylee McKeown	Australia	27.58	
4	7	Lauren Cox	England	27.61	
5	5	Medi Harris	Wales	27.62	
6	2	Bronte Job	Australia	27.85	
7	1	Danielle Hil	Northern Ireland	28.29	
8	8	Rebecca Meder	South Africa	28.66	
