= Athletics at the 1962 British Empire and Commonwealth Games – Men's high jump =

Men's high jump at the 1962 British Empire and Commonwealth Games
- Venue: Perry Lakes Stadium
- Date: 24 November 1962
- Competitors: 13 from 8 nations
- Winning height: 6 ft 11 in (2.11 m) GR

Medalists
| gold medal | Percy Hobson | Australia |
| silver medal | Chilla Porter | Australia |
| bronze medal | Anton Norris | Barbados |

The men's high jump at the 1962 British Empire and Commonwealth Games as part of the athletics programme was held at the Perry Lakes Stadium on Saturday 24 November 1962.

The event was won by Australian Percy Hobson with a jump of 6 ft 11 in (2.11 m), setting a new Games record. Hobson won by one inch ahead of fellow countryman Chilla Porter and Anton Norris from Barbados who won the bronze medal.

== Records ==
| World record | Valeriy Brumel (URS) | 7 ft 5 in (2.26 m) | Palo Alto, California, United States | 22 July 1962 |
| Commonwealth record | | | | |
| Games record | Ernle Haisley (JAM) | 6 ft 9 in (2.06 m) | Cardiff, Wales | 20 July 1958 |

== Final ==
| Rank | Name | Nationality | Result | Notes |
|---|---|---|---|---|
| 1st place, gold medalist(s) | Percy Hobson | Australia | 6 ft 11 in (2.11 m) | GR |
| 2nd place, silver medalist(s) | Chilla Porter | Australia | 6 ft 10 in (2.08 m) | |
| 3rd place, bronze medalist(s) | Anton Norris | Barbados | 6 ft 8 in (2.03 m) | |
| 4 | Gordon Miller | England | 6 ft 8 in (2.03 m) | |
| 5 | Joseph Leresae | Kenya | 6 ft 8 in (2.03 m) | |
| 6 | Lawrie Peckham | Australia | 6 ft 8 in (2.03 m) | |
| 7 | Tony Sneazwell | Australia | 6 ft 7 in (2.01 m) | |
| 8 | Crawford Fairbrother | Scotland | 6 ft 6 in (1.98 m) | |
| 9 | Patrick Etolu | Uganda | 6 ft 6 in (1.98 m) | |
| 10 | Leroy Lucas | British Honduras | 6 ft 4 in (1.93 m) | |
| 11 | Edward Laboran | Papua New Guinea | 6 ft 4 in (1.93 m) | |
| | Laurie Taitt | England | | DNS |
| | John Howell | England | | DNS |
