= Swimming at the 2022 Commonwealth Games – Women's 200 metre backstroke =

Women's 200 metre backstroke at the 2022 Commonwealth Games
- Venue: Sandwell Aquatics Centre
- Dates: 1 August
- Competitors: 15 from 11 nations
- Winning time: 2:05.60 GR

Medalists
gold medal	Kaylee McKeown	Australia
silver medal	Kylie Masse	Canada
bronze medal	Katie Shanahan	Scotland

The women's 200 metre backstroke event at the 2022 Commonwealth Games was held on 1 August at the Sandwell Aquatics Centre.

== Records ==
Prior to this competition, the existing world, Commonwealth and Games records were as follows:

World record	Regan Smith (USA)	2:03.35	Gwangju, South Korea	26 July 2019
Commonwealth record	Kaylee McKeown (AUS)	2:04.28	Adelaide, Australia	17 June 2021
Games record	Kylie Masse (CAN)	2:05.98	Gold Coast, Australia	8 April 2018

The following records were established during the competition:

Date	Event	Name	Nationality	Time	Record
1 August	Final	Kaylee McKeown	Australia	2:05.60	GR

== Schedule ==
The schedule is as follows:

All times are British Summer Time (UTC+1)

Date	Time	Round
Monday 1 August 2022	10:30	Qualifying
Monday 1 August 2022	19:13	Final

== Results ==
=== Heats ===
Rank	Heat	Lane	Name	Nationality	Time	Notes
1	2	4	Kaylee McKeown	Australia	2:10.95	Q
2	1	4	Kylie Masse	Canada	2:11.27	Q
3	1	5	Minna Atherton	Australia	2:11.38	Q
4	2	3	Katie Shanahan	Scotland	2:11.48	Q
5	1	3	Holly McGill	Scotland	2:13.03	Q
6	2	6	Charlotte Evans	Wales	2:14.68	Q
7	1	6	Gemma Atherley	Jersey	2:17.47	Q
8	2	5	Cassie Wild	Scotland	2:17.94	Q
9	2	2	Danielle Titus	Barbados	2:19.35	R
10	2	7	Ganga Senavirathne	Sri Lanka	2:26.63	R
11	1	2	Danielle Treasure	Barbados	2:26.72	
12	1	7	Katelyn Cabral	Bahamas	2:33.19	
13	2	1	Kiera Prentice	Isle of Man	2:38.01	
14	1	1	Poppy Davis-Coyle	Saint Helena	2:48.18	
15	2	8	Aishath Sausan	Maldives	2:58.24	

=== Final ===
Rank	Lane	Name	Nationality	Time	Notes
1st place, gold medalist(s)	4	Kaylee McKeown	Australia	2:05.60	GR
2nd place, silver medalist(s)	5	Kylie Masse	Canada	2:07.81	
3rd place, bronze medalist(s)	6	Katie Shanahan	Scotland	2:09.22	
4	3	Minna Atherton	Australia	2:09.40	
5	2	Holly McGill	Scotland	2:13.00	
6	7	Charlotte Evans	Wales	2:14.26	
7	8	Cassie Wild	Scotland	2:18.32	
8	1	Gemma Atherley	Jersey	2:18.53	
