= Swimming at the 2022 Commonwealth Games – Women's 100 metre backstroke =

Women's 100 metre backstroke at the 2022 Commonwealth Games
- Venue: Sandwell Aquatics Centre
- Dates: 30 July (heats, semifinals); 31 July (final)
- Competitors: 30 from 21 nations
- Winning time: 58.60

Medalists
gold medal	Kaylee McKeown	Australia
silver medal	Kylie Masse	Canada
bronze medal	Medi Harris	Wales

The women's 100 metre backstroke event at the 2022 Commonwealth Games will be held on 30 and 31 July at the Sandwell Aquatics Centre.

== Records ==
Prior to this competition, the existing world, Commonwealth and Games records were as follows:

World record	Kaylee McKeown (AUS)	57.45	Adelaide, Australia	13 June 2021
Commonwealth record	Kaylee McKeown (AUS)	57.45	Adelaide, Australia	13 June 2021
Games record	Kylie Masse (CAN)	58.63	Gold Coast, Australia	7 April 2018

== Schedule ==
The schedule is as follows:

All times are British Summer Time (UTC+1)

Date	Time	Round
Saturday 30 July 2022	11:18	Qualifying
Saturday 30 July 2022	20:22	Semifinals
Sunday 31 July 2022	20:45	Final

== Results ==
=== Heats ===
Rank	Heat	Lane	Name	Nationality	Time	Notes
1	3	4	Kylie Masse	Canada	58.93	Q
2	4	4	Kaylee McKeown	Australia	59.58	Q
3	4	5	Medi Harris	Wales	1:00.02	Q
4	3	5	Minna Atherton	Australia	1:00.65	Q
5	2	3	Lauren Cox	England	1:00.77	Q
6	4	3	Mary-Sophie Harvey	Canada	1:00.98	Q
7	4	2	Rebecca Meder	South Africa	1:01.78	Q
8	3	3	Danielle Hil	Northern Ireland	1:01.85	Q
9	2	5	Cassie Wild	Scotland	1:02.06	Q
10	2	6	Charlotte Evans	Wales	1:02.31	Q
11	3	2	Holly McGill	Scotland	1:02.41	Q
12	4	6	Katie Shanahan	Scotland	1:02.86	Q
13	4	7	Tatiana Tostevin	Guernsey	1:03.50	Q
14	3	6	Hazel Ouwehand	New Zealand	1:03.86	Q
15	2	7	Emma Harvey	Bermuda	1:04.17	Q
16	2	2	Danielle Titus	Barbados	1:04.18	Q
17	3	7	Gemma Atherley	Jersey	1:04.20	R
18	3	1	Emma Hodgson	Isle of Man	1:04.82	R
19	2	1	Maddy Moore	Bermuda	1:04.84	
20	4	8	Ganga Senavirathne	Sri Lanka	1:06.17	
21	4	1	Lushavel Stickland	Samoa	1:07.51	
22	3	8	Danielle Treasure	Barbados	1:09.08	
23	2	8	Nubia Adjei	Ghana	1:09.12	
24	1	3	Avice Meya	Uganda	1:10.35	
25	1	4	Kiera Prentice	Isle of Man	1:12.19	
26	1	5	Jamie Joachim	Saint Vincent and the Grenadines	1:12.40	
27	1	2	Tilly Collymore	Grenada	1:13.41	
28	1	6	Poppy Davis-Coyle	Saint Helena	1:17.90	
29	1	1	Aishath Sausan	Maldives	1:20.49	
30	1	7	Hamna Ahmed	Maldives	1:22.02	
	2	4	Mollie O'Callaghan	Australia	DNS	

=== Semifinals ===
Rank	Heat	Lane	Name	Nationality	Time	Notes
1	2	4	Kylie Masse	Canada	58.83	Q
2	1	4	Kaylee McKeown	Australia	59.08	Q
3	2	5	Medi Harris	Wales	59.64	Q
4	2	3	Lauren Cox	England	1:00.36	Q
5	1	5	Minna Atherton	Australia	1:00.50	Q
6	1	3	Mary-Sophie Harvey	Canada	1:00.59	Q
7	1	7	Katie Shanahan	Scotland	1:01.66	Q
8	2	6	Rebecca Meder	South Africa	1:01.71	Q
9	1	6	Danielle Hil	Northern Ireland	1:01.74	R
10	2	2	Cassie Wild	Scotland	1:01.81	R
11	2	7	Holly McGill	Scotland	1:02.54	
12	1	2	Charlotte Evans	Wales	1:02.76	
13	2	8	Emma Harvey	Bermuda	1:03.82	
14	2	1	Tatiana Tostevin	Guernsey	1:03.99	
15	1	1	Hazel Ouwehand	New Zealand	1:04.10	
16	1	8	Danielle Titus	Barbados	1:05.24	

=== Final ===
Rank	Lane	Name	Nationality	Time	Notes
1st place, gold medalist(s)	5	Kaylee McKeown	Australia	58.60	GR
2nd place, silver medalist(s)	4	Kylie Masse	Canada	58.73	
3rd place, bronze medalist(s)	3	Medi Harris	Wales	59.62	
4	2	Minna Atherton	Australia	1:00.02	
5	6	Lauren Cox	England	1:00.17	
6	7	Mary-Sophie Harvey	Canada	1:00.72	
7	8	Rebecca Meder	South Africa	1:02.06	
8	1	Katie Shanahan	Scotland	1:02.09	
