= Saint Helena at the 2014 Commonwealth Games =

- CGF code: SHN
- CGA: National Sports Association of Saint Helena

in Glasgow, Scotland
- Competitors: 10 in 3 sports
- Flag bearer: Simon Henry
- Medals: Gold 0 Silver 0 Bronze 0 Total 0

Commonwealth Games appearances (overview)
- 1982; 1986–1994; 1998; 2002; 2006; 2010; 2014; 2018; 2022; 2026; 2030

Saint Helena competed in the 2014 Commonwealth Games in Glasgow, Scotland from 23 July to 3 August 2014. A team of 10 athletes represented the country in swimming, badminton and shooting. The return trip to Saint Helena takes 19 days.

== Badminton ==
Singles

Athlete	Event	Round of 64	Round of 32	Round of 16	Quarterfinals	Semifinals	Final	Rank
Athlete	Event	Opposition Score	Opposition Score	Opposition Score	Opposition Score	Opposition Score	Opposition Score	Rank
Ryan Benjamin	Men's Singles	Sharafuddeen (MDV); L 0 - 2	did not advance					
Dwayne March	Men's Singles	Kidambi (IND); L 0 - 2	did not advance					
Lee Yon	Men's Singles	Daren (MAS); L 0 - 2	did not advance					

Doubles

Athlete	Event	Round of 64	Round of 32	Round of 16	Quarterfinals	Semifinals	Final	Rank
Athlete	Event	Opposition Score	Opposition Score	Opposition Score	Opposition Score	Opposition Score	Opposition Score	Rank
Dwayne March; Vernon Smeed	Men's Doubles	Bye	Northern Ireland; L 0 - 2	did not advance				
Ryan Benjamin; Lee Yon	Men's Doubles	Bye	Mauritius; L 0 - 2	did not advance				

== Shooting ==
Athlete	Event	Qualification		Final	
Athlete	Event	Points	Rank	Points	Rank
Jordie Andrews	Men's 50 metre rifle prone	607.9	22	did not advance	
Jordie Andrews	Men's 50 metre rifle three positions	950.0	16	did not advance	
Simon Henry	Men's 50 metre rifle three positions	1109.0	12	did not advance	
Simon Henry	Men's 10 metre air rifle	596.8	16	did not advance	
Patrick Young	Men's 50 metre rifle prone	550.0	36	did not advance	
Madolyn Andrews	Women's 50 metre rifle prone	593.2	25	did not advance	
Chelsea Benjamin	Women's 50 metre rifle prone	598.7	23	did not advance	

== Swimming ==
Men

Athlete	Event	Heat		Semifinal		Final	
Athlete	Event	Time	Rank	Time	Rank	Time	Rank
Ben Dillon	50 m freestyle	27.14	=62	did not advance			
Ben Dillon	100 m freestyle	1:01.94	62	did not advance			
