= Percy Hobson (high jumper) =

Australian high jumper (1942–2022)

Personal information
- Full name: Percy Francis Hobson
- Nationality: Australian
- Born: 5 November 1942 Bourke, New South Wales, Australia
- Died: 4 January 2022 (aged 79) Melbourne, Victoria, Australia
- Height: 178 cm (5 ft 10 in)

Sport
- Sport: Athletics
- Event: High jump
Medal record
Men's athletics
Representing Australia
British Empire and Commonwealth Games
Gold medal – first place	1962 Perth	High jump

Percy Francis Hobson (5 November 1942 – 4 January 2022) was an Australian high jumper. He won the men's event at the 1962 British Empire and Commonwealth Games in Perth, making him the first Indigenous Australian to earn a gold medal at the Commonwealth Games.

== Early life ==
Hobson was born on 5 November 1942 in Bourke, New South Wales, to Fanny Williams and Percy Hobson. Fanny was the daughter of a respected NSW Police Aboriginal tracker, Frank Williams, who was a Ngemba man. One of ten children, Hobson was named Percy after his father and Francis after his grandfather and uncle who was killed while on active service in Malaya around the time of his birth. His mother Fanny was from Brewarrina. During his youth Hobson trained using a makeshift high-jump.

== Career ==
In November 1961, Percy Hobson broke the NSW resident high-jump record with a leap of 6 ft 8 in (2.03 m). In March 1962, at the Australian Athletics Championships, Hobson won the high jump event with a jump of 6 ft 7 in (2.01 m), defeating Tony Sneazwell on a countback. Eight months later at the 1962 British Empire and Commonwealth Games in Perth, Hobson, aged 20 years, won gold in the high jump clearing the bar at 6 ft 11 in (2.11 m), setting a new Commonwealth Games record. In doing so, he became the first Indigenous Australian to win a gold medal for Australia at the Commonwealth Games. Hobson received a hero's welcome when he returned to Bourke and the local brass band played "Hail, the Conquering Hero".

== Death ==
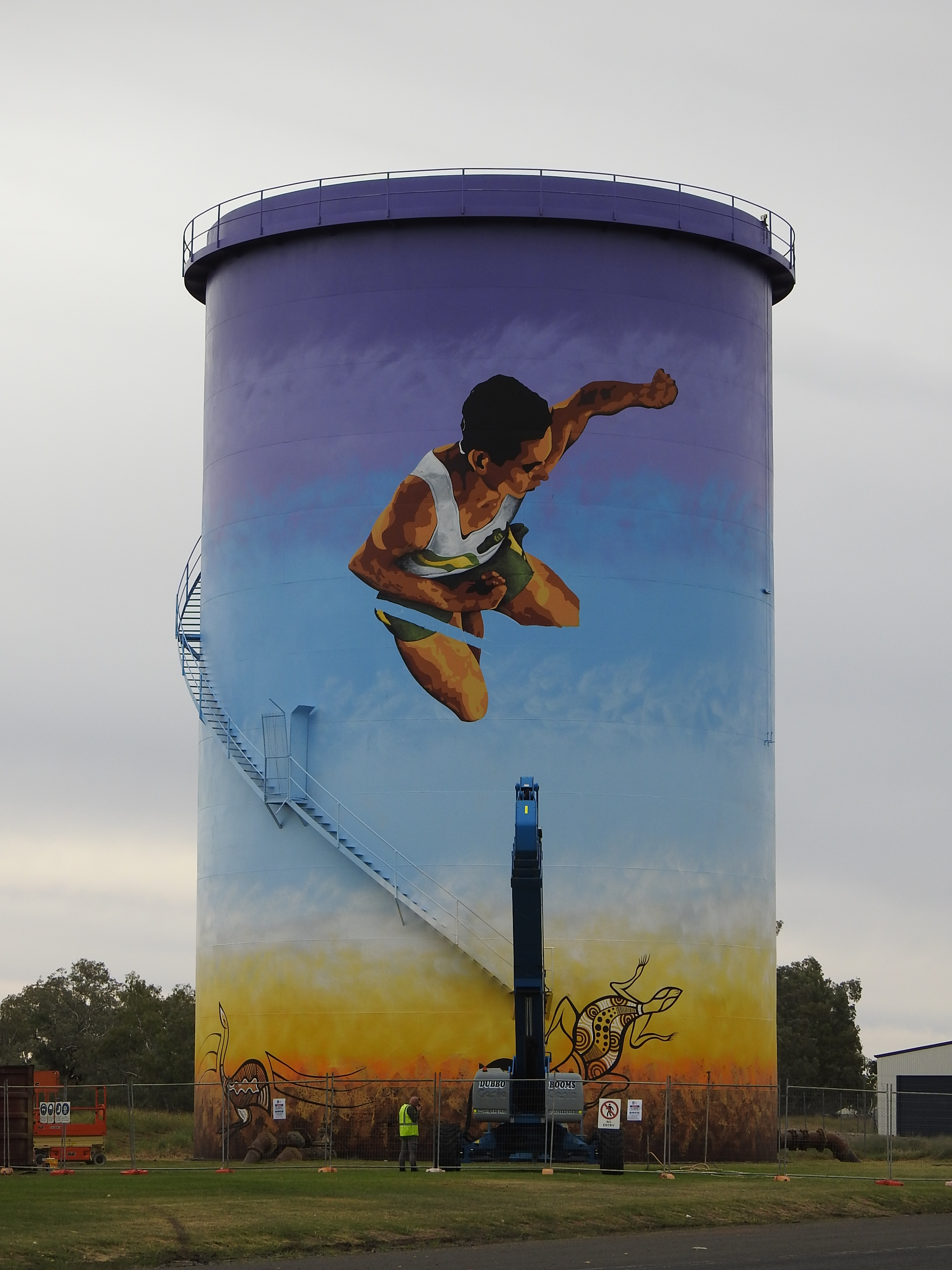
A mural of Hobson in Bourke, 2021

Hobson died in Mooroolbark, a suburb of Melbourne, Victoria, on 4 January 2022, at the age of 79.

== Legacy ==
A local park in Bourke was later renamed Percy Hobson Park in his honour.

A small standing exhibit on Hobson is at Bourke's The Back 'O Bourke Exhibition Centre.

On the park's water tower, a mural project was commenced prior to July 2020 to raise funds to paint a mural on the tower, supported by Hobson's sisters Freda Harvey and Heather Mieni. With the base coats applied, the mural started in April 2021, a re-creation of an iconic photo of the moment Hobson earned his first gold medal.
