= Saint Helena at the Commonwealth Games =

- CGF code: SHN
- CGA: National Sports Association of Saint Helena
- Website: nsash.org.sh
- Medals Ranked 0th: Gold 0 Silver 0 Bronze 0 Total 0

Commonwealth Games appearances (overview)
- 1982; 1986–1994; 1998; 2002; 2006; 2010; 2014; 2018; 2022; 2026; 2030

The British overseas territory of Saint Helena, Ascension and Tristan da Cunha, simply known as "Saint Helena", the most populous region in the territory, has competed in five Commonwealth Games. The first was in 1982, after which they were absent from the Games for sixteen years, before returning in 1998. They have competed in every subsequent Games to date. Saint Helena has never won a medal at the Commonwealth Games.

Athletes from Ascension Island have participated on the Saint Helena Commonwealth Games team in the past, while Tristan da Cunha is not known to have ever sent any athletes.

The territory changed its name in 2009 — previously it was known as "St Helena and Dependencies". The remoteness of the territory and lack of transport links to the rest of the world has made it difficult for teams to reach the Commonwealth Games.
