= Swimming at the 2022 Commonwealth Games – Women's 200 metre freestyle =

Event held on 29 July at the Sandwell Aquatics Centre

Women's 200 metre freestyle at the 2022 Commonwealth Games
- Venue: Sandwell Aquatics Centre
- Dates: 29 July
- Competitors: 30 from 19 nations
- Winning time: 1:53.89

Medalists
gold medal	Ariarne Titmus	Australia
silver medal	Mollie O'Callaghan	Australia
bronze medal	Madison Wilson	Australia

The women's 200 metre freestyle event at the 2022 Commonwealth Games will be held on 29 July at the Sandwell Aquatics Centre.

== Records ==
Prior to this competition, the existing world, Commonwealth and Games records were as follows:

World record	Federica Pellegrini (ITA)	1:52.98	Rome, Italy	29 July 2009
Commonwealth record	Ariarne Titmus (AUS)	1:53.09	Adelaide, Australia	14 June 2021
Games record	Taylor Ruck (CAN)	1:54.81	Gold Coast, Australia	5 April 2018

== Schedule ==
The schedule is as follows:

All times are British Summer Time (UTC+1)

Date	Time	Round
Friday 29 July 2022	11:01	Qualifying
Friday 29 July 2022	19:25	Final

== Results ==
=== Heats ===
Rank	Heat	Lane	Name	Nationality	Time	Notes
1	4	4	Ariarne Titmus	Australia	1:55.68	Q
2	3	4	Mollie O'Callaghan	Australia	1:56.65	Q
3	2	4	Madison Wilson	Australia	1:56.93	Q
4	4	5	Freya Anderson	England	1:57.59	Q
5	3	5	Erika Fairweather	New Zealand	1:58.18	Q
6	4	6	Katrina Bellio	Canada	1:59.78	Q
7	4	2	Victoria Catterson	Northern Ireland	1:59.86	Q, NR
8	2	5	Lucy Hope	Scotland	2:00.01	Q
9	3	3	Aimee Canny	South Africa	2:00.10	R
10	3	6	Eve Thomas	New Zealand	2:00.27	R
11	4	3	Mary-Sophie Harvey	Canada	2:00.35	
12	2	6	Michaela Pulford	South Africa	2:01.21	
13	2	3	Tamryn van Selm	England	2:01.50	
14	3	7	Lily Scott	Jersey	2:05.25	
15	2	2	Gemma Atherley	Jersey	2:06.47	
16	2	7	Kyra Rabess	Cayman Islands	2:07.67	
17	1	4	Harper Barrowman	Cayman Islands	2:07.98	
18	3	2	Bethany Firth	Northern Ireland	2:08.34	
19	4	7	Grace Davison	Northern Ireland	2:10.00	
20	3	1	Danielle Treasure	Barbados	2:10.17	
21	4	1	Zaylie-Elizabeth Thompson	Bahamas	2:11.34	
22	2	1	Jehanara Nabi	Pakistan	2:13.38	
23	2	8	Kiera Prentice	Isle of Man	2:14.61	
24	3	8	Tilly Collymore	Grenada	2:17.13	
25	4	8	Therese Soukup	Seychelles	2:17.89	
26	1	6	Zaira Forson	Ghana	2:19.02	
27	1	5	Jamie Joachim	Saint Vincent and the Grenadines	2:21.47	
28	1	2	Poppy Davis-Coyle	Saint Helena	2:26.18	
29	1	3	Charissa Panuve	Tonga	2:26.19	
30	1	7	Vivienne Ponsford	Saint Helena	2:32.23	

=== Final ===
Rank	Lane	Name	Nationality	Time	Notes
1st place, gold medalist(s)	4	Ariarne Titmus	Australia	1:53.89	GR
2nd place, silver medalist(s)	5	Mollie O'Callaghan	Australia	1:54.01	
3rd place, bronze medalist(s)	3	Madison Wilson	Australia	1:56.17	
4	6	Freya Anderson	England	1:56.83	
5	2	Erika Fairweather	New Zealand	1:57.08	
6	8	Lucy Hope	Scotland	1:59.74	
7	7	Katrina Bellio	Canada	2:00.05	
8	1	Victoria Catterson	Northern Ireland	2:00.65	
