= Barbados at the 2010 Commonwealth Games =

- CGF code: BAR
- CGA: Barbados Olympic Association
- Website: olympic.org.bb

in Delhi, India
- Competitors: 39 in 11 sports
- Flag bearers: Opening:Laurel Browne; Closing:
- Medals: Gold 0 Silver 0 Bronze 0 Total 0

Commonwealth Games appearances (overview)
- 1954; 1958; 1962; 1966; 1970; 1974; 1978; 1982; 1986; 1990; 1994; 1998; 2002; 2006; 2010; 2014; 2018; 2022; 2026; 2030

Barbados competed in the 2010 Commonwealth Games held in Delhi, India, from 3 to 14 October 2010.

Barbados athletes.

== Athletics ==
- Stephen Headley
- Shakera Reece

== Badminton ==
- Mariama Eastmond
- Nicholas Reifer
- Dakeil Thorpe
- Shari Watson

== Boxing ==
- Cobia Breedy
- Anderson Emmanuel

== Cycling ==
=== Road ===
- Darren Matthews

=== Track ===
- Barry Forde
- Christian Lyte
- Darren Matthews

== Netball ==
- Lydia Bishop
- Latonia Blackman
- Nadia Blackman
- Shakera Reece
- Laurel Browne
- Samantha Browne
- Makeba Clarke
- Damisha Croney
- Kizzy Marville
- Nikita Piggott
- Lisa Puckerin
- Yvette Sealy
- Sabreena Smith

== Shooting ==
- Junior Benskin
- Bernard Chase
- Chester Foster
- Calvert Herbert
- Jennifer Jordan-Cousins
- William Murrell

== Squash ==
- Shawn Simpson

== Swimming ==
- Raymond Edwards

== Table Tennis ==
- Mark-Anthony Dowell
- Kevin Farley
- Sherrice Felix
- Sabrina Worrell

== Tennis ==
- Darian King
- Haydn Lewis

== Weightlifting ==
- Kristin Edwards

== See also ==
- 2010 Commonwealth Games
