= Barbados at the 1998 Commonwealth Games =

- Flag of Barbados
- CG code: BAR
- CGA: Barbados Olympic Association
- Website: olympic.org.bb

in Kuala Lumpur, Malaysia 11 September 1998 – 21 September 1998
- Medals Ranked 22nd: Gold 1 Silver 0 Bronze 2 Total 3

Commonwealth Games appearances (overview)
- 1954; 1958; 1962; 1966; 1970; 1974; 1978; 1982; 1986; 1990; 1994; 1998; 2002; 2006; 2010; 2014; 2018; 2022; 2026; 2030

Barbados competed at the 1998 Commonwealth Games in Kuala Lumpur, Malaysia from 11 to 21 September 1998. It was Barbados's 11th appearance at the Commonwealth Games.

== Medalists ==
The following Barbadian competitors won medals at the games. In the discipline sections below, the medalists' names are bolded.

Medal	Name	Sport	Event
Gold	Andrea Blackett	Athletics	Women's 400 metres hurdles
Bronze	Obadele Thompson	Athletics	Men's 100 metres
Bronze	Barry Forde	Cycling	Men's sprint

== Cricket ==
Barbados named the below squad for the tournament.

Roster

- Philo Wallace (c)
- Henderson Bryan
- Sherwin Campbell
- Pedro Collins
- Vasbert Drakes
- Ottis Gibson
- Adrian Griffith
- Ryan Hinds
- Roland Holder
- Ricky Hoyte (wk)
- Mark Lavine
- Winston Reid
- Floyd Reifer
- Horace Walrond

Summary

Team	Event	Group stage				Semifinal	Final / BM	
Team	Event	Opposition Result	Opposition Result	Opposition Result	Rank	Opposition Result	Opposition Result	Rank
Barbados men	Men's tournament	Bangladesh; **W** by 4 wickets (D/L)	Northern Ireland; **W** by 176 runs	South Africa; **L** by 4 wickets	2	did not advance		6

Group stage

Group C
Pos	Team	Pld	W	L	T	NR	Pts	NRR
1	South Africa	3	3	0	0	0	**6**	1.143
2	Barbados	3	2	1	0	0	**4**	1.330
3	Northern Ireland	3	1	2	0	0	**2**	−0.643
4	Bangladesh	3	0	3	0	0	**0**	−1.547

Source: ESPNcricinfo

10 September 1998
10:00
Scorecard

**Bangladesh**; 144/7 (47 overs)	**v**	**Barbados**; 160/6 (41.3 overs)
Shahriar Hossain 70* (123); Henderson Bryan 3/32 (10 overs)		Adrian Griffith 31; Naimur Rahman 2/30 (9 overs)

**Barbados won by 4 wickets (D/L method)**
Royal Selangor Club, Kuala Lumpur
Umpires: Russell Tiffin (Zim) and Saleem Badar (Pak)

- Barbados won the toss and elected to field.
- The match was reduced to 47 overs per side due to rain, Barbados target was 160 runs.
- Points: Barbados 2, Bangladesh 0.

13 September 1998
10:00
Scorecard

**Barbados**; 296/5 (50 overs)	**v**	**Northern Ireland**; 120/7 (50 overs)
Philo Wallace 92; Dekker Curry 2/42 (10 overs)		Stephen Smyth 58; Ottis Gibson 2/18 (7 overs)

**Barbados won by 176 runs**
Rubber Research Institute Ground, Shah Alam
Umpires: Javed Akhtar (Pak) and William Smith (Sco)

- Northern Ireland won the toss and elected to field.
- Ryan Hinds (Bar) made his List A debut.
- Points: Barbados 2, Northern Ireland 0.
- Northern Ireland were eliminated as a result of this match.

15 September 1998
10:00
Scorecard

**Barbados**; 254/6 (50 overs)	**v**	**South Africa**; 257/6 (48.2 overs)
Philo Wallace 74 (73); Alan Dawson 2/47 (8 overs)		Jacques Kallis 71 (96); Ottis Gibson 3/38 (9 overs)

**South Africa won by 4 wickets**
Kelab Aman, Kuala Lumpur
Umpires: K. T. Francis (SL) and V. K. Ramaswamy (Ind)

- Barbados won the toss and elected to bat.
- Points: South Africa 2, Barbados 0.
- South Africa qualified for the semi-finals and Barbados were eliminated as a result of this match.

== Netball ==
Squad

- Denese Alleyne
- Lydia Bishop
- Latonia Blackman
- Jacqueline Browne
- Sandra Harper
- Marion Johnson
- Sherry Ann Martindale
- Julie Phillips
- Shonette Azore
- Joan Scantlebury
- Don Small
- Olivia Walcott
- Linda Wilson

Summary

Barbados finished eighth in the netball at the 1998 Commonwealth Games. In the group stages, they won two of their five matches.

Group A

14 September 1998	**England**	**51–29**	**Barbados**

15 September 1998	**Malaysia**	**30–58**	**Barbados**

16 September 1998	**Australia**	**71–36**	**Barbados**

17 September 1998	**Barbados**	**57–44**	**Canada**

18 September 1998	**Jamaica**	**71–39**	**Barbados**

Pos	Team	P	W	D	L	GF	GA	GD	Pts
1	Australia	5	5	0	0	377	145	+232	10
2	England	5	4	0	1	257	197	+60	8
3	Jamaica	5	3	0	2	317	223	-94	6
4	Barbados	5	2	0	3	219	267	-48	4
5	Canada	5	1	0	4	195	306	-111	2
6	Malaysia	5	0	0	5	120	347	-227	0

Qualified for Semi-final 1
Qualified for Semi-final 2
