= Shooting at the 2018 Commonwealth Games – Men's 50 metre rifle three positions =

Men's 50 metre rifle three positions at the 2018 Commonwealth Games
- Venue: Belmont Shooting Centre, Brisbane
- Dates: 14 April
- Competitors: 19 from 12 nations

Medalists
gold medal	Sanjeev Rajput	India
silver medal	Grzegorz Sych	Canada
bronze medal	Dean Bale	England

The Men's 50 metre rifle three positions event at the 2018 Commonwealth Games was held on 14 April at the Belmont Shooting Centre, Brisbane.

== Results ==
=== Qualification ===
Shooters fired at the target 40 times each in the kneeling / prone / standing positions (120 shots in total). The top eight shooters advanced to the final.

Rank	Name	Kneeling							Prone							Kneeling & Prone	Standing							Total	Notes
Rank	Name	1	2	1-2	3	1-3	4	Result	1	2	1-2	3	1-3	4	Result	Kneeling & Prone	1	2	1-2	3	1-3	4	Result	Total	Notes
1	Sanjeev Rajput (IND)	97	98	195	98	293	98	391	100	100	200	100	300	99	399	790	96	98	194	98	292	98	390	1180-58x	Q, QGR
2	Chain Singh (IND)	99	96	195	97	292	97	389	100	99	199	99	298	100	398	787	93	96	189	95	284	95	379	1166-50x	Q
3	Dean Bale (ENG)	99	98	197	99	296	96	392	100	99	199	94	293	100	393	785	91	97	188	95	283	95	378	1163-55x	Q
4	Kenneth Parr (ENG)	99	97	196	94	290	98	388	100	100	200	98	298	100	398	786	93	93	186	96	282	90	372	1158-62x	Q
5	Dane Sampson (AUS)	96	94	190	94	284	93	377	99	96	195	98	293	99	392	769	94	98	192	98	290	95	385	1154-51x	Q
6	Cameron Pirouet (JEY)	97	95	192	96	288	96	384	97	97	194	95	289	96	385	769	88	97	185	99	284	96	380	1149-44x	Q
7	Grzegorz Sych (CAN)	98	94	192	97	289	97	386	99	98	197	98	295	96	391	777	93	94	187	92	279	89	368	1145-45x	Q
8	Ghufran Adil (PAK)	93	97	190	95	285	97	382	94	96	190	98	288	99	387	769	92	97	189	96	285	91	376	1145-44x	Q
9	Michael Bamsey (WAL)	95	97	192	96	288	97	385	99	98	197	96	293	96	389	774	93	93	186	92	278	93	371	1145-40x	
10	Mohammad Chowdhury (BAN)	93	97	190	95	285	94	379	96	97	193	97	290	97	387	766	96	96	192	93	285	93	378	1144-38x	
11	Neil Stirton (SCO)	93	93	186	95	281	97	378	100	98	198	97	295	99	394	772	94	93	187	89	276	92	368	1140-44x	
12	William Godward (AUS)	93	94	187	93	280	97	377	96	98	194	96	290	95	385	762	92	92	184	97	281	92	373	1135-28x	
13	Gulraaj Sehmi (KEN)	97	91	188	93	281	93	374	100	98	198	100	298	100	398	772	88	93	181	90	271	89	360	1132-36x	
14	Rory Hamilton (NIR)	98	95	193	95	288	95	383	95	98	193	100	293	100	393	776	82	87	169	93	262	91	353	1129-42x	
15	Simon Henry (SHN)	94	92	186	95	281	92	373	97	96	193	97	290	97	387	760	87	88	175	89	264	88	352	1112-30x	
16	Stuart Hill (NIR)	95	93	188	92	280	92	372	97	95	192	95	287	99	386	758	86	80	166	87	253	85	338	1096-36x	
17	Gurupreet Dhanjal (KEN)	93	90	183	91	274	88	362	97	96	193	97	290	98	388	750	75	80	155	81	236	82	318	1068-24x	
18	Carlos Yon (SHN)	80	84	164	84	248	81	329	99	98	197	95	292	93	385	714	68	77	145	70	215	74	289	1003-22x	
–	Abdullah Hel Baki (BAN)	—																						DNS	

=== Final ===
Shooters fired at the target 15 times each in the kneeling / prone positions, then 10 times in the standing position (after which the two lowest-ranked shooters were eliminated). The lowest-ranked shooter was then eliminated for each of the last five shots taken.

Rank	Name	Kneeling					Prone					Kneeling & Prone	Standing (Elimination)																		Total	Notes
Rank	Name	1	2	1-2	3	Result	1	2	1-2	3	Result	Kneeling & Prone	1	2	1-2	Total	3	1-3	Total	4	1-4	Total	5	1-5	Total	6	1-6	Total	7	Result	Total	Notes
1st place, gold medalist(s)	Sanjeev Rajput (IND)	51.1	49.4	100.5	50.0	150.5	51.8	52.4	104.2	52.2	156.4	306.9	49.2	49.5	98.7	405.6	10.3	109.0	415.9	10.1	119.1	426.0	9.0	128.1	435.0	9.2	137.3	444.2	10.3	147.6	454.5	FGR
2nd place, silver medalist(s)	Grzegorz Sych (CAN)	51.0	50.7	101.7	53.1	154.8	49.7	51.8	101.5	52.0	153.5	308.3	46.9	48.1	95.0	403.3	10.7	105.7	414.0	9.2	114.9	423.2	10.1	125.0	433.3	9.1	134.1	442.4	6.0	140.1	448.4	
3rd place, bronze medalist(s)	Dean Bale (ENG)	48.9	50.0	98.9	49.9	148.8	51.2	51.0	102.2	50.9	153.1	301.9	51.2	49.2	100.4	402.3	9.6	110.0	411.9	10.4	120.4	422.3	9.7	130.1	432.0	9.2	139.3	441.2	-	-	441.2	
4	Cameron Pirouet (JEY)	51.8	50.1	101.9	50.8	152.7	51.8	49.4	101.2	50.4	151.6	304.3	48.4	47.4	95.8	400.1	9.4	105.2	409.5	9.8	115.0	419.3	9.5	124.5	428.8	-	-	-	-	-	428.8	
5	Chain Singh (IND)	48.5	51.0	99.5	49.8	149.3	52.5	52.2	104.7	52.3	157.0	306.3	46.9	47.9	94.8	401.1	9.4	104.2	410.5	8.6	112.8	419.1	-	-	-	-	-	-	-	-	419.1	
6	Kenneth Parr (ENG)	48.2	49.3	97.5	50.9	148.4	51.7	51.6	103.3	52.4	155.7	304.1	46.0	47.6	93.6	397.7	9.0	102.6	406.7	-	-	-	-	-	-	-	-	-	-	-	406.7	
7	Dane Sampson (AUS)	47.4	48.9	96.3	48.1	144.4	51.7	52.1	103.8	50.8	154.6	299.0	49.6	48.5	98.1	397.1	-	-	-	-	-	-	-	-	-	-	-	-	-	-	397.1	
8	Ghufran Adil (PAK)	48.5	49.1	97.6	50.3	147.9	50.7	50.7	101.4	50.5	151.9	299.8	44.8	45.9	90.7	390.5	-	-	-	-	-	-	-	-	-	-	-	-	-	-	390.5	
