= Barbados at the Commonwealth Games =

- CG code: BAR
- CGA: Barbados Olympic Association
- Website: olympic.org.bb
- Medals Ranked 34th: Gold 3 Silver 4 Bronze 8 Total 15

Commonwealth Games appearances (overview)
- 1954; 1958; 1962; 1966; 1970; 1974; 1978; 1982; 1986; 1990; 1994; 1998; 2002; 2006; 2010; 2014; 2018; 2022; 2026; 2030

Barbados have sent teams to fifteen Commonwealth Games. The first Games at which they competed were in 1954, and the only event since they have not attended was the 1986 Games. They have won fifteen medals, with a twenty-eight-year medal drought between 1970 and 1998.

On 30 November 2021, Barbados became a republic since the removal of Queen Elizabeth II as head of state after 55 years as monarchy.

== Medals ==
Games	Gold	Silver	Bronze	Total
1954 Vancouver	0	1	0	1
1958 Cardiff	1	1	0	2
1962 Perth	0	0	1	1
1966 Kingston	0	0	1	1
1970 Edinburgh	0	1	0	1
1974 Christchurch	0	0	0	0
1978 Edmonton	0	0	0	0
1982 Brisbane	0	0	0	0
1986 Edinburgh	did not attend			
1990 Auckland	0	0	0	0
1994 Victoria	0	0	0	0
1998 Kuala Lumpur	1	0	2	3
2002 Manchester	0	0	1	1
2006 Melbourne	0	0	1	1
2010 Delhi	0	0	0	0
2014 Glasgow	0	0	1	1
2018 Gold Coast	0	0	0	0
2022 Birmingham	1	1	1	3
Total	3	4	8	15

== See also ==
- Sport in Barbados
- Barbados at the Olympics
- Barbados at the Pan American Games
- Barbados at the Paralympics
