= Bill Sneazwell =

Australian rules footballer, born 1906

William (Bill) Sneazwell
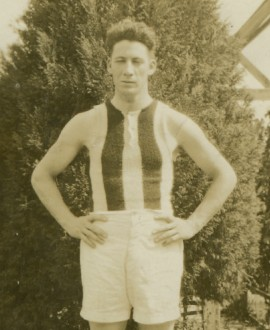
- Sneazwell during his Collingwood career

Personal information
- Full name: William Henry John Sneazwell
- Born: 3 April 1906; South Melbourne, Victoria
- Died: 14 December 1967 (aged 61); Fitzroy, Victoria
- Original team: Thornbury CYMS (CYMSFA)
- Height: 182 cm (6 ft 0 in)
- Weight: 74 kg (163 lb)

Playing career^{1}
Years	Club	Games (Goals)
1926–1928	Collingwood	20 (0)
- ^{1} Playing statistics correct to the end of 1928.

William Henry John Sneazwell (3 April 1906 – 14 December 1967) was a former Australian rules footballer who played for the Collingwood Football Club in the Victorian Football League (VFL).

== Family ==
The son of Henry Bow Sneazwell (1882-1941), and Mary Frances Sneazwell (1876-1970), née O'Connor, William Henry John Sneazwell was born at South Melbourne, Victoria on 3 April 1906.

He married Eileen Mary Keenan (1908-1932) in 1928.

He married Veronica Hanlon (1915-2001) on 22 March 1941; their son, Anthony Howard "Tony" Sneazwell (1942-), a former champion Australian high jumper, competed at the 1964 and 1968 Summer Olympics.

== Death ==
He died, of lymphoma, at St Vincent's Hospital, in Fitzroy on 14 December 1967.
