= Isle of Man at the 2022 Commonwealth Games =

- Flag of the Isle of Man
- CGF code: IOM
- CGA: Commonwealth Games Association of the Isle of Man
- Website: cga.im

in Birmingham, England 28 July 2022 – 8 August 2022
- Competitors: 34 (19 men and 15 women) in 8 sports
- Flag bearers: Mark Cavendish; Laura Kinley
- Medals: Gold 0 Silver 0 Bronze 0 Total 0

Commonwealth Games appearances (overview)
- 1958; 1962; 1966; 1970; 1974; 1978; 1982; 1986; 1990; 1994; 1998; 2002; 2006; 2010; 2014; 2018; 2022; 2026; 2030

The Isle of Man competed at the 2022 Commonwealth Games in Birmingham, England between 28 July and 8 August 2022. Having made its Games debut in 1958, it was the Isle of Man's seventeenth appearance at the Games.

Cyclist Mark Cavendish and swimmer Laura Kinley were the country's flagbearers during the opening ceremony.

The Games marked the first time since 2002 that the Isle of Man failed to win any medals.

== Competitors ==
The following is the list of number of competitors participating at the Games per sport/discipline.

Sport	Men	Women	Total
Athletics	4	3	7
Badminton	0	1	1
Boxing	1	1	2
Cycling	8	5	13
Gymnastics	0	1	1
Para powerlifting	0	1	1
Swimming	4	3	7
Triathlon	2	0	2
Total	19	15	34

== Athletics ==
Two athletes were selected on 14 September 2021; a further two were added on 25 January 2022 and three more on 5 May 2022.

Men
Track and road events

Athlete	Event	Heat		Final	
Athlete	Event	Result	Rank	Result	Rank
David Mullarkey	1500 m	3:50.06	8	Did not advance	
David Mullarkey	5000 m	—		13:43.92	12
Oliver Lockley	Marathon	—		2:25:52	14

Field events

Athlete	Event	Final	
Athlete	Event	Distance	Rank
Glen Quayle	Pole vault	4.95	8
Joe Harris	Javelin throw	67.91	11

Women
Track and road events

Athlete	Event	Final	
Athlete	Event	Result	Rank
Sarah Astin	5000 m	15:39.54	16
Rachael Franklin	5000 m	16:13.23	19
Sarah Webster	Marathon	2:51:53	14

== Badminton ==
One player was selected on 3 May 2022.

Singles

Athlete	Event	Round of 64	Round of 32	Round of 16	Quarterfinal	Semifinal	Final / BM	
Athlete	Event	Opposition Score	Opposition Score	Opposition Score	Opposition Score	Opposition Score	Opposition Score	Rank
Jessica Li	Women's singles	Chipeleme (ZAM); W (21–15, 21–8)	Scott (BAR); W (21–10, 21–15)	Gilmour (SCO); L (8―21, 12―21)	Did not advance			

== Boxing ==
Two boxers were selected on 3 May 2022.

Athlete	Event	Round of 32	Round of 16	Quarterfinals	Semifinals	Final	
Athlete	Event	Opposition Result	Opposition Result	Opposition Result	Opposition Result	Opposition Result	Rank
Jamie Devine	Men's Light welterweight	Omar (GHA); L 1-4	Did not advance				
Jade Burden	Women's Lightweight	—	Bye	Richardson (ENG); L 0-5	Did not advance		

== Cycling ==
Eight cyclists were selected on 14 September 2021; a further three were added on 25 January 2022 and two more on 5 May 2022.

=== Road ===
Men

Athlete	Event	Time	Rank
Matthew Bostock	Road race	DNF	
Samuel Brand	Road race	3:38:11	63
Mark Cavendish	Road race	3:37:08	44
Mark Christian	Road race	3:37:08	42
Thomas Mazzone	Road race	3:37:08	38
Ben Swift	Road race	3:32:23	15
Tyler Hannay	Time trial	51:02.83	16
Leon Mazzone	Time trial	52:28.38	20

Women

Athlete	Event	Time	Rank
Jessica Carridge	Road race	2:44:46	22
Anna Christian	Road race	DNF	
Lizzie Holden	Road race	2:44:46	19
Amelia Sharpe	Road race	DNF	
Rebecca Storrie	Road race	2:44:53	26
Jessica Carridge	Time trial	46:42.04	24
Lizzie Holden	Time trial	41:48.78	5
Rebecca Storrie	Time trial	41:53.49	6

=== Track ===
Scratch race

Athlete	Event	Qualification	Final
Matthew Bostock	Men's scratch race	DNF	Did not advance

== Gymnastics ==
One gymnast was selected on 25 January 2022.

=== Artistic ===
Women
Individual Qualification

Athlete	Event	Apparatus				Total	Rank
Athlete	Event	V	UB	BB	F	Total	Rank
Tara Donnelly	Qualification	10.950	11.050	10.100	11.600	43.700	23 Q

Individual Finals

Athlete	Event	Apparatus				Total	Rank
Athlete	Event	V	UB	BB	F	Total	Rank
Tara Donnelly	All-around	12.800	11.100	11.850	11.300	47.050	13

== Para powerlifting ==
One powerlifter was selected on 3 May 2022.

Athlete	Event	Result	Rank
Kimberley Dean	Women's lightweight	73.7	8

== Swimming ==
Two swimmers were selected on 14 September 2021; a further two were added on 25 January 2022 and two more on 5 May 2022.

A seventh swimmer was added on 22 June 2022.

Men

Athlete	Event	Heat		Semifinal		Final	
Athlete	Event	Time	Rank	Time	Rank	Time	Rank
Harry Robinson	50 m freestyle	23.56	21	Did not advance			
Joel Watterson	50 m freestyle	23.20	17	Did not advance			
Alex Bregazzi	100 m freestyle	51.82	29	Did not advance			
Harry Robinson	100 m freestyle	51.98	30	Did not advance			
Joel Watterson	100 m freestyle	50.98	22	Did not advance			
Peter Allen	200 m freestyle	1:57.48	28	—		Did not advance	
Alex Bregazzi	200 m freestyle	1:52.33	23	—		Did not advance	
Harry Robinson	50 m backstroke	26.72	24	Did not advance			
Harry Robinson	100 m backstroke	59.66	25	Did not advance			
Peter Allen	50 m butterfly	25.74	31	Did not advance			
Harry Robinson	50 m butterfly	25.21	26	Did not advance			
Joel Watterson	50 m butterfly	24.67	21	Did not advance			
Peter Allen	100 m butterfly	56.80	27	Did not advance			
Peter Allen	200 m butterfly	2:09.37	16	—		Did not advance	
Joel Watterson; Alex Bregazzi; Harry Robinson; Peter Allen	4 × 100 m freestyle relay	3:27.30	7 Q	—		3:26.44	7
Alex Bregazzi; Joel Watterson; Peter Allen; Harry Robinson	4 × 200 m freestyle relay	—				7:43.70	7

Women

Athlete	Event	Heat		Semifinal		Final	
Athlete	Event	Time	Rank	Time	Rank	Time	Rank
Kiera Prentice	200 m freestyle	2:14.61	23	—		Did not advance	
Kiera Prentice	400 m freestyle	4:48.86	19	—		Did not advance	
Kiera Prentice	50 m backstroke	33.86	30	Did not advance			
Kiera Prentice	100 m backstroke	1:12.19	25	Did not advance			
Kiera Prentice	200 m backstroke	2:38.01	13	—		Did not advance	
Emma Hodgson	50 m backstroke	30.25	18	Did not advance			
Emma Hodgson	100 m backstroke	1:04.82	18	Did not advance			
Laura Kinley	50 m breaststroke	32.34	12 Q	32.47	12	Did not advance	
Laura Kinley	100 m breaststroke	1:10.66	13 Q	1:10.77	13	Did not advance	

Mixed

Athlete	Event	Heat		Final	
Athlete	Event	Time	Rank	Time	Rank
Harry Robinson; Alex Bregazzi; Kiera Prentice; Emma Hodgson	4 × 100 m freestyle relay	3:48.45	10	Did not advance	
Emma Hodgson; Laura Kinley; Peter Allen; Joel Watterson	4 × 100 m medley relay	4:04.59	9	Did not advance	

== Triathlon ==
One triathlete was selected on 25 January 2022, followed by a second on 2 June 2022.

Individual

Athlete	Event	Swim (750 m)	Trans 1	Bike (20 km)	Trans 2	Run (5 km)	Total	Rank
Niall Caley	Men's	8:56	0:55	27:36	0:20	16:13	54:00	20
Will Draper	Men's	9:49	0:53	28:07	0:18	16:50	55:57	24
