= Medi Harris =

Welsh swimmer (born 2002)

Personal information
- Full name: Medi Eira Harris
- Nationality: British; Welsh
- Born: 15 September 2002 (age 24) Porthmadog, Gwynedd, Wales

Sport
- Country: Great Britain/Wales
- Sport: Swimming
- Events: Backstroke, Freestyle
Medal record
Women's swimming
Representing Great Britain
World Championships (LC)
Silver medal – second place	2024 Doha	4×200 m freestyle
Bronze medal – third place	2024 Doha	4×100 m mixed medley
European Championships (LC)
Gold medal – first place	2022 Rome	4×100 m freestyle
Silver medal – second place	2022 Rome	100 m backstroke
Silver medal – second place	2022 Rome	4×200 m freestyle
Bronze medal – third place	2022 Rome	4×100 m mixed medley
European Junior Championships
Bronze medal – third place	2019 Kazan	4x100 m medley
Representing Wales
Commonwealth Games
Bronze medal – third place	2022 Birmingham	100 m backstroke

Medi Eira Harris (born 15 September 2002) is a Welsh international swimmer competing for Great Britain and Wales in backstroke and freestyle. She was part of the gold medal-winning women's 4x100 freestyle relay team at the 2022 European Aquatics Championships. Representing Wales at the 2022 Commonwealth Games, she won a bronze medal in the women's 100 metre backstroke.

== Biography ==
Harris won two medals at the 2022 British Swimming Championships: gold in the 100m backstroke, and silver in the 50m backstroke She subsequently represented Great Britain at the 2022 World Aquatics Championships.

She was selected for the 2022 Commonwealth Games in Birmingham, where she competed in two events: the women's 50m backstroke and the women's 100m backstroke, winning a bronze medal in the latter.

At the 2022 European Aquatics Championships in Rome, she won a silver medal in the final of the Women's 100 metre backstroke and another as a member of the British team in the Women's 4 × 200 metre freestyle relay. At the same championships, she won gold as a member of the British Women's 4 × 100 metre freestyle relay team, and bronze as a member of the Mixed 4 × 100 metre medley relay team.

In 2023, she won the gold medal at the 2023 British Swimming Championships in the 100 metres backstroke. It was the second time that she had won the 100 metres title. After finishing third in the 200 metres freestyle at the 2024 Aquatics GB Swimming Championships, Harris qualified for the 2024 Summer Olympics.

At the 2024 Olympic Games in Paris, she participated in the women's 100 metre backstroke competition, where she was eliminated in the heats.
