= Barbados at the 1962 British Empire and Commonwealth Games =

- CGF code: BAR
- CGA: Barbados Olympic Association
- Website: olympic.org.bb

in Perth, Western Australia
- Competitors: 1 in 1 sport
- Flag bearers: Opening: Closing:
- Medals Ranked =17thth: Gold 0 Silver 0 Bronze 1 Total 1

British Empire and Commonwealth Games appearances
- 1954; 1958; 1962; 1966; 1970; 1974; 1978; 1982; 1986; 1990; 1994; 1998; 2002; 2006; 2010; 2014; 2018; 2022; 2026; 2030

Barbados competed at the 1962 British Empire and Commonwealth Games in Perth, Western Australia, from 22 November to 1 December 1962. It won one bronze medal at the games.

== Medalists ==
Medal	Name	Sport	Event	Date
Bronze	Anton Norris	Athletics	Men's high jump	24 November

== Athletics ==
Men
Field events

Athlete	Event	Final	
Athlete	Event	Distance	Rank
Anton Norris	High jump	6 ft 8 in (2.03 m)	3rd place, bronze medalist(s)
