= Tony Sneazwell =

Australian high jumper (born 1942)

Personal information
- Nationality: Australian
- Born: 4 October 1942 (age 83) Melbourne, Australia
- Height: 187 cm (6 ft 2 in)
- Weight: 81 kg (179 lb)

Sport
- Sport: Athletics
- Event: high jump

Anthony Howard Sneazwell (4 October 1942) is an Australian former high jumper who competed in the 1964 Summer Olympics and in the 1968 Summer Olympics. He was also the team dentist of the Edmonton Oilers in the NHL from 1988 until he retired in 2011.

== Biography ==
Sneazwell won the 1963 Helms Award as the most outstanding amateur athlete in Australasia. Track & Field News ranked him as the #2 high jumper in the world that year, behind only Valeriy Brumel.

Sneazwell finished second behind Chris Dunn in the high jump event at the British 1973 AAA Championships.

== Family ==
The son of former Collingwood footballer, William Henry John Sneazwell (1906-1967), and Veronica Sneazwell (1915-2001).
