= List of Commonwealth Games records in swimming =

Below is a complete list of the Commonwealth Games records in swimming, ratified by the Commonwealth Games Federation (CGF). Competition is held in long course (50 m) pools.

This is not to be confused with Commonwealth records, which are records by athletes from Commonwealth nations, but performed in any meet or competition.

== Men's events ==
Event	Time		Name	Nationality	Date	Meet	Location	Ref
50 m freestyle	20.97		Cameron McEvoy	Australia	26 July 2026	2026 Commonwealth Games	Glasgow, Scotland	
100 m freestyle	47.09	r	Flynn Southam	Australia	24 July 2026	2026 Commonwealth Games	Glasgow, Scotland	
200 m freestyle	1:44.71		Ian Thorpe	Australia	31 July 2002	2002 Commonwealth Games	Manchester, England	
400 m freestyle	3:40.08	CR	Ian Thorpe	Australia	30 July 2002	2002 Commonwealth Games	Manchester, England	
800 m freestyle	7:39.81		Samuel Short	Australia	27 July 2026	2026 Commonwealth Games	Glasgow, Scotland	
1500 m freestyle	14:41.66		Kieren Perkins	Australia	24 August 1994	1994 Commonwealth Games	Victoria, Canada	
50 m backstroke	24.18		Pieter Coetze	South Africa	25 July 2026	2026 Commonwealth Games	Glasgow, Scotland	
100 m backstroke	51.71	r	Pieter Coetze	South Africa	29 July 2026	2026 Commonwealth Games	Glasgow, Scotland	
200 m backstroke	1:54.22		Pieter Coetze	South Africa	26 July 2026	2026 Commonwealth Games	Glasgow, Scotland	
50 m breaststroke	26.38	sf, †	Michael Houlie	South Africa	24 July 2026	2026 Commonwealth Games	Glasgow, Scotland	
100 m breaststroke	58.59	sf	Adam Peaty	England	6 April 2018	2018 Commonwealth Games	Gold Coast, Australia	
200 m breaststroke	2:07.30		Ross Murdoch	Scotland	24 July 2014	2014 Commonwealth Games	Glasgow, Scotland	
50m butterfly	22.73	=, =OC	Kyle Chalmers	Australia	29 July 2026	2026 Commonwealth Games	Glasgow, Scotland	
50m butterfly	22.73	=, =OC	Ben Armbruster	Australia	29 July 2026	2026 Commonwealth Games	Glasgow, Scotland	
100m butterfly	50.42		Josh Liendo	Canada	26 July 2026	2026 Commonwealth Games	Glasgow, Scotland	
200m butterfly	1:54.00		Chad le Clos	South Africa	7 April 2018	2018 Commonwealth Games	Gold Coast, Australia	
200m individual medley	1:56.38		Duncan Scott	Scotland	24 July 2026	2026 Commonwealth Games	Glasgow, Scotland	
400m individual medley	4:08.70	CR	Lewis Clareburt	New Zealand	30 July 2022	2022 Commonwealth Games	Birmingham, England	
4×100m freestyle relay	3:09.49		Flynn Southam (47.09); Kai Taylor (47.53); Harrison Turner (47.94); Kyle Chalmers (46.93)	Australia	24 July 2026	2026 Commonwealth Games	Glasgow, Scotland	
4×200m freestyle relay	7:01.47		Samuel Short (1:46.08); Harrison Turner (1:45.95); Edward Sommerville (1:45.04); Kai Taylor (1:44.10)	Australia	26 July 2026	2026 Commonwealth Games	Glasgow, Scotland	
4×100m medley relay	3:28.71		Henry Allan (53.58); Samuel Williamson (58.40); Matthew Temple (50.18); Flynn Southam (46.55)	Australia	29 July 2026	2026 Commonwealth Games	Glasgow, Scotland	

Legend: # – Record awaiting ratification by Commonwealth Games Federation; WR – World record; CR – Commonwealth record;
Records not set in finals: h – heat; sf – semifinal; r – relay 1st leg; rh – relay heat 1st leg; so – swim-off

== Women's events ==
Event	Time		Name	Nationality	Date	Meet	Location	Ref
50m freestyle	23.78	CR	Cate Campbell	Australia	7 April 2018	2018 Commonwealth Games	Gold Coast, Australia	
100m freestyle	52.27		Bronte Campbell	Australia	9 April 2018	2018 Commonwealth Games	Gold Coast, Australia	
200m freestyle	1:53.89		Ariarne Titmus	Australia	29 July 2022	2022 Commonwealth Games	Birmingham, England	
400m freestyle	3:58.06		Ariarne Titmus	Australia	3 August 2022	2022 Commonwealth Games	Birmingham, England	
800m freestyle	8:11.12		Lani Pallister	Australia	28 July 2026	2026 Commonwealth Games	Glasgow, Scotland	
1500m freestyle	15:41.03		Lani Pallister	Australia	26 July 2026	2026 Commonwealth Games	Glasgow, Scotland	
50m backstroke	27.31		Kylie Masse	Canada	3 August 2022	2022 Commonwealth Games	Birmingham, England	
100m backstroke	58.60		Kaylee McKeown	Australia	31 July 2022	2022 Commonwealth Games	Birmingham, England	
200m backstroke	2:05.60		Kaylee McKeown	Australia	1 August 2022	2022 Commonwealth Games	Birmingham, England	
50m breaststroke	29.73		Lara van Niekerk	South Africa	30 July 2022	2022 Commonwealth Games	Birmingham, England	
100m breaststroke	1:05.09		Leisel Jones	Australia	20 March 2006	2006 Commonwealth Games	Melbourne, Australia	
200m breaststroke	2:20.72		Leisel Jones	Australia	18 March 2006	2006 Commonwealth Games	Melbourne, Australia	
50m butterfly	25.20	CR	Francesca Halsall	England	27 July 2014	2014 Commonwealth Games	Glasgow, Scotland	
100m butterfly	56.36		Maggie Mac Neil	Canada	30 July 2022	2022 Commonwealth Games	Birmingham, England	
200m butterfly	2:05.45		Alys Thomas	Wales	9 April 2018	2018 Commonwealth Games	Gold Coast, Australia	
200m individual medley	2:08.21		Siobhan-Marie O'Connor	England	27 July 2014	2014 Commonwealth Games	Glasgow, Scotland	
400m individual medley	4:29.01		Summer McIntosh	Canada	29 July 2022	2022 Commonwealth Games	Birmingham, England	
4×100m freestyle relay	3:30.05		Shayna Jack (54.03); Bronte Campbell (52.03); Emma McKeon (52.99); Cate Campbell (51.00)	Australia	5 April 2018	2018 Commonwealth Games	Gold Coast, Australia	
4×200m freestyle relay	7:39.29		Madison Wilson (1:56.27); Kiah Melverton (1:55.40); Mollie O'Callaghan (1:54.80); Ariarne Titmus (1:52.82)	Australia	31 July 2022	2022 Commonwealth Games	Birmingham, England	
4×100m medley relay	3:54.25		Iona Anderson (58.83); Sienna Toohey (1:06.75); Alexandria Perkins (56.30); Meg Harris (52.37)	Australia	29 July 2026	2026 Commonwealth Games	Glasgow, Scotland	

Legend: # – Record awaiting ratification by Commonwealth Games Federation; WR – World record; CR – Commonwealth record;
Records not set in finals: h – heat; sf – semifinal; r – relay 1st leg; rh – relay heat 1st leg; so – swim-off

== Mixed relay ==
Event	Time	Name	Nationality	Date	Meet	Location	Ref
4×100 m freestyle relay	3:19.36	Flynn Southam (47.29); Kyle Chalmers (47.62); Shayna Jack (52.42); Meg Harris (52.03)	Australia	25 July 2026	2026 Commonwealth Games	Glasgow, Scotland	
4×100 m medley relay	3:40.46	Iona Anderson (59.44); Samuel Williamson (58.81); Matthew Temple (50.05); Meg Harris (52.16)	Australia	28 July 2026	2026 Commonwealth Games	Glasgow, Scotland	

Legend: # – Record awaiting ratification by Commonwealth Games Federation; WR – World record; CR – Commonwealth record;
Records not set in finals: h – heat; sf – semifinal; r – relay 1st leg; rh – relay heat 1st leg; so – swim-off

== Record holder's gallery ==
Some of the current Commonwealth Games record holders in swimming:

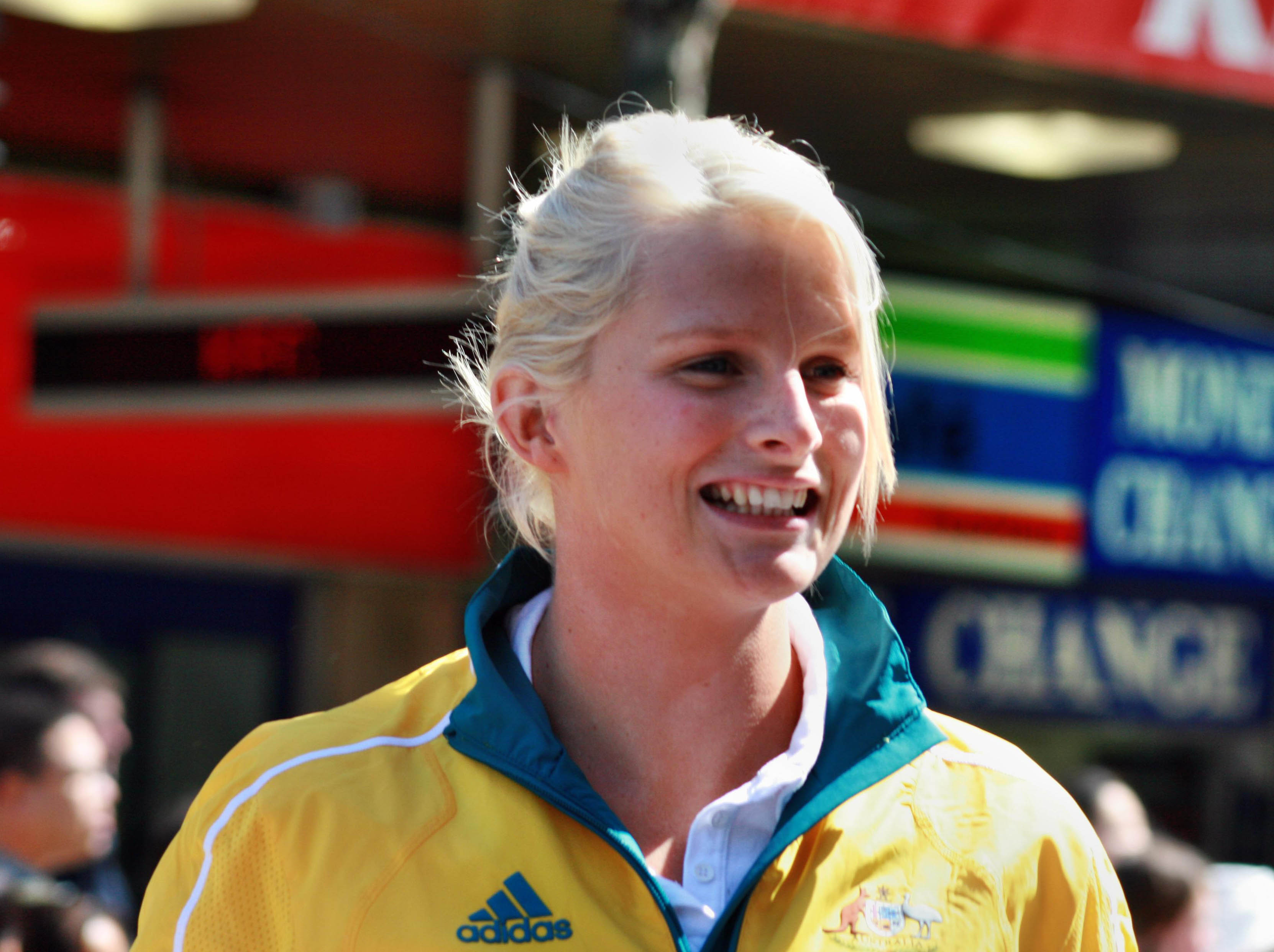
Leisel Jones

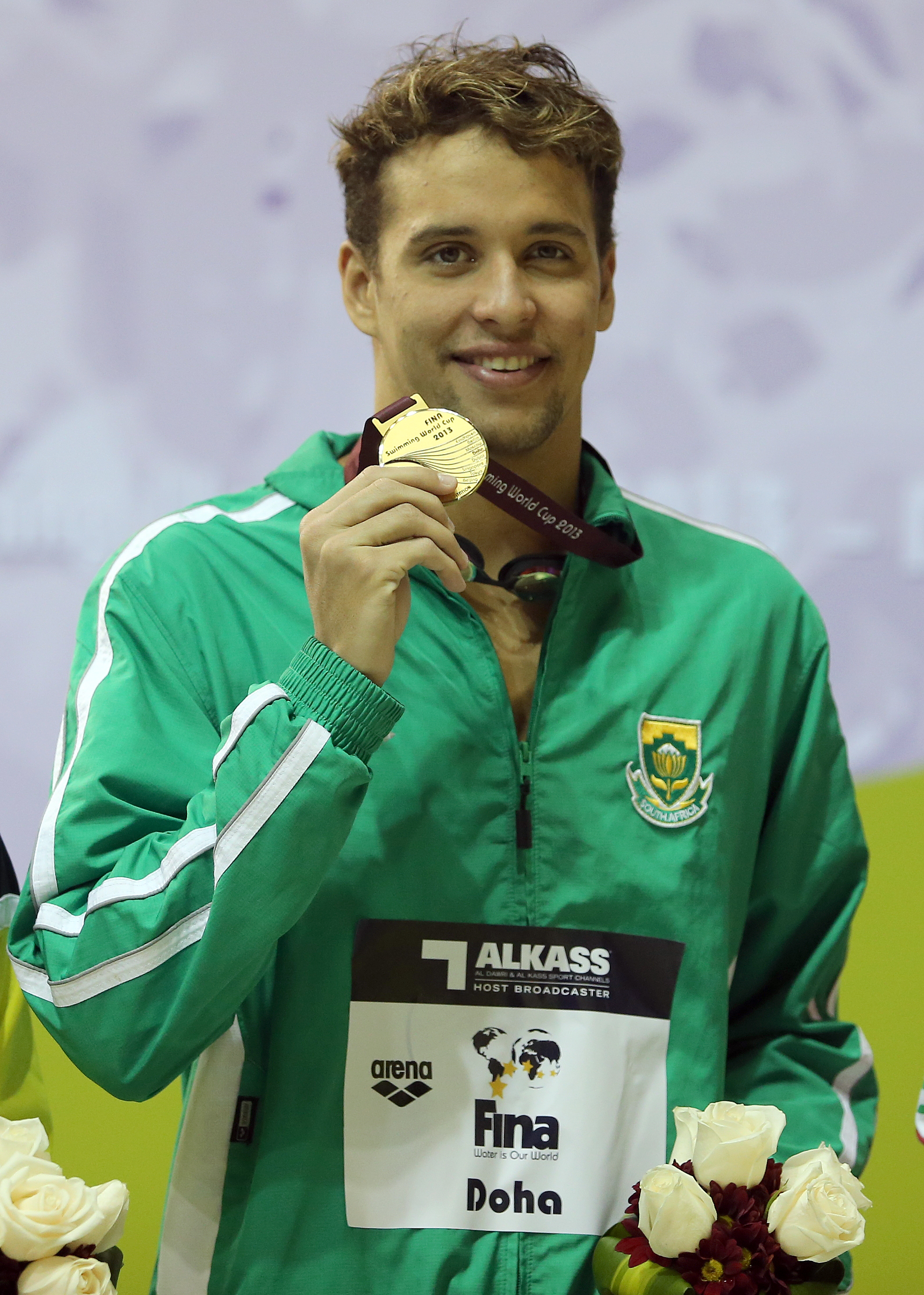
Chad le Clos

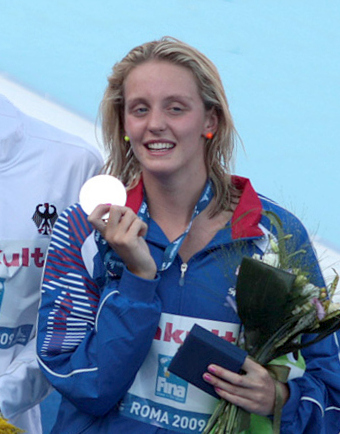
Fran Halsall

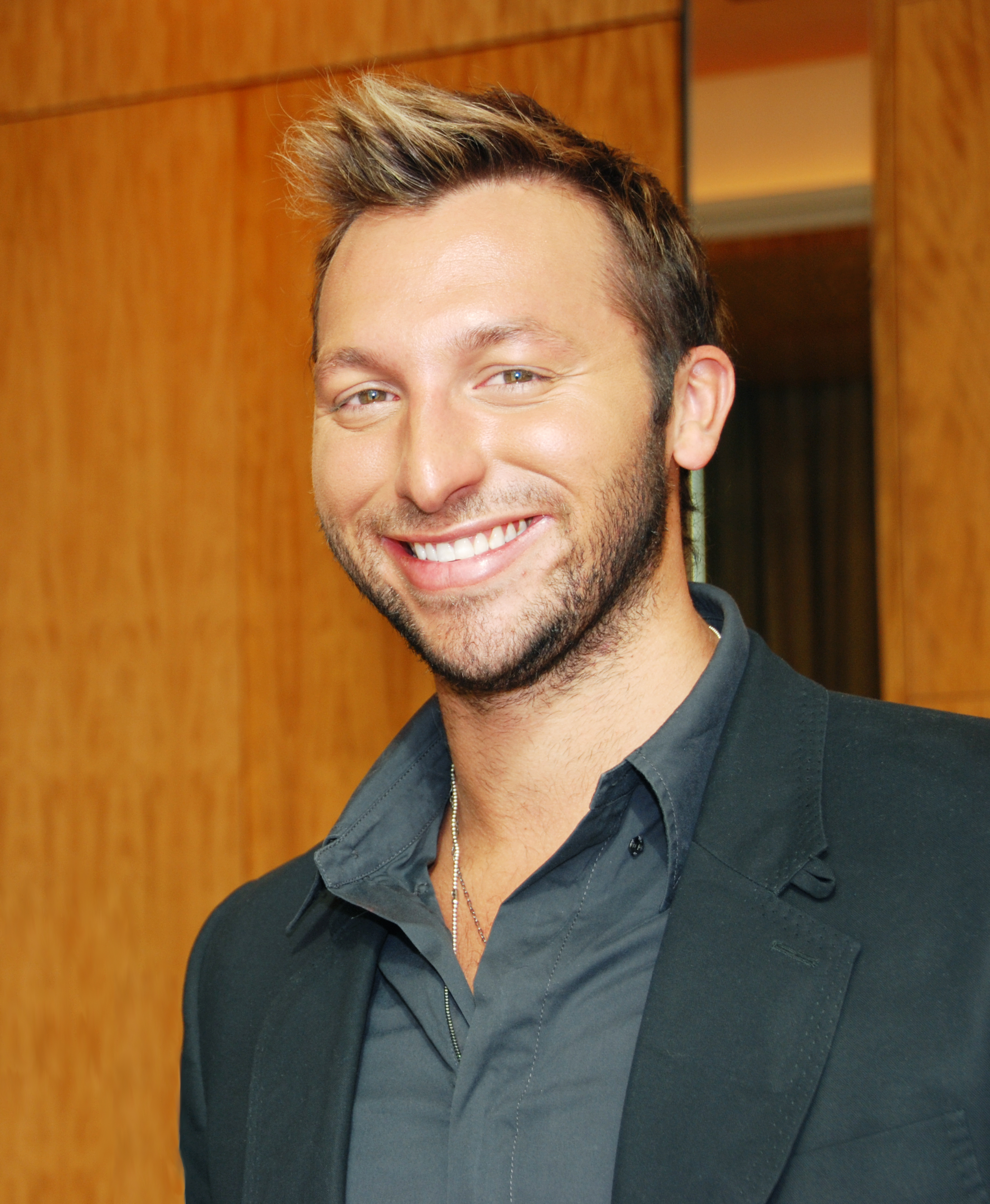
Ian Thorpe

== See also ==
- Commonwealth Games records
