= Colby Thomas =

American baseball player (born 2001)

Philadelphia Phillies
- Outfielder
- Born: January 26, 2001 (age 25); Valdosta, Georgia, U.S.
- Bats: Right Throws: Right

MLB debut
- June 30, 2025, for the Athletics

MLB statistics (through 2026 season)
- Batting average: .214
- Home runs: 10
- Runs batted in: 30
- Stats at Baseball Reference

Teams
- Athletics (2025–2026)
Medals
Men's baseball
Representing United States
WBSC Premier12
| Bronze medal – third place | 2024 Tokyo | Team |

Colby Grant Thomas (born January 26, 2001) is an American professional baseball outfielder for the Philadelphia Phillies of Major League Baseball (MLB). He made his MLB debut in 2025 for the Athletics.

== Amateur career ==
Thomas attended Valdosta High School in Valdosta, Georgia, where he played baseball. As a senior in 2019, he hit .416 with 13 home runs, 45 RBIs, and 17 stolen bases. Thomas was selected by the Baltimore Orioles in the 37th round of the 2019 Major League Baseball draft, but did not sign and instead enrolled at Mercer University to play college baseball.

Thomas played in 16 games as a freshman for Mercer in 2020 before the season was cancelled, batting .333 with five home runs and 18 RBIs. He hit .247 with ten home runs and 37 RBIs over 53 games as a sophomore in 2021. Thomas then played collegiate summer baseball in the Cape Cod Baseball League for the Bourne Braves where he batted .228 with four home runs over 29 games. As a junior in 2022, he hit .325 with 17 home runs and 45 RBIs over 42 games before a shoulder injury ended his season. He committed to transfer to the University of Florida following the season's end.

== Professional career ==
=== Oakland Athletics / Athletics ===
The Oakland Athletics selected Thomas in the third round (95th overall) of the 2022 Major League Baseball draft and he signed with the team. He made his professional debut in 2023 with the Single-A Stockton Ports and was promoted to the High-A Lansing Lugnuts in early July. Over 126 appearances for the two affiliates, Thomas slashed .286/.351/.493 with 18 home runs, 82 RBI, 39 doubles, and 25 stolen bases.

Thomas was assigned to the Double-A Midland RockHounds to open the 2024 season. In mid-June, he was promoted to the Triple-A Las Vegas Aviators. In 132 games split between the two affiliates, Thomas batted .277 with 31 home runs, 92 RBI, and 15 stolen bases. During the offseason he played for Team USA in the Premier 12 Tournament.

Thomas was assigned to Las Vegas to open the 2025 season and hit a home run in the team's season opener. In 76 appearances for the Aviators, he slashed .297/.365/.542 with 17 home runs, 70 RBI, and seven stolen bases.

On June 30, 2025, Thomas was selected to the 40-man roster and promoted to the major leagues for the first time. He made his MLB debut that night as a pinch-hitter versus the Tampa Bay Rays at George M. Steinbrenner Field. Thomas recorded his first MLB hit the next day, a double off of Shane Baz. He hit his first MLB home run on August 9, a two-run home run off of Mitchell Parker of the Washington Nationals. Thomas appeared in 49 games for the Athletics and hit .225 with six home runs and 19 RBI.

Thomas was optioned to Triple-A Las Vegas to begin the 2026 season. He was recalled by the Athletics on April 22. Across 55 games played with the Athletics, Thomas batted .202 with four home runs and 11 RBI.

=== Philadlephia Phillies ===
On August 3, 2026, Thomas was traded to the Philadelphia Phillies in exchange for Seth Johnson. The Phillies subsequently assigned him to the Triple-A Lehigh Valley IronPigs. Thomas played the remainder of the 2026 season with Lehigh Valley and batted .143 with one home run and eight RBI across 32 games.
