= Samantha Browne =

Barbadian netball player

Personal information
- Born: 3 July 1989 (age 36)
- Height: 1.69 m (5 ft 6 1/2 in)
- Occupation: netball player

Netball career
- Playing position(s): wing attack, centre, wing defense

Samantha Browne (born 3 July 1989) is a Barbadian netball player who represents Barbados internationally and plays in the positions of wing attack, centre and wing defense. She competed at the Netball World Cup on four occasions in 2007, 2011, 2015 and 2019. She also represented Barbados at the Commonwealth Games in 2014, which also marked her maiden Commonwealth Games appearance.
