= Saint Helena at the 2010 Commonwealth Games =

Sporting event delegation

Flag of Saint Helena

Saint Helena, part of the British overseas territory of Saint Helena, Ascension and Tristan da Cunha, competed in the 2010 Commonwealth Games held in Delhi, India, from 3 to 14 October 2010. Saint Helena sent a team of four shooters.

== Shooting ==
Saint Helena's team consisted of 4 shooters.

- Rico Yon
- Cyril Leo
- Collin Knipe
- Carlos Yon

== See also ==
- 2010 Commonwealth Games
