= National Sports Association of Saint Helena =

The National Amateur Sports Association of Saint Helena or N.A.S.A.S. is the governing body of sport in the British Overseas Territories of Saint Helena, Ascension and Tristan da Cunha. The association organises the island teams which compete in the Commonwealth Games and in their youth version. The headquarters of the organisation are located in the capital of Saint Helena, Jamestown. The chairman of the organisation is Eric Benjamin and the secretary is Pamela Young.

== National stadium ==
Stadium	Capacity	City
Francis Plain Playing Field	2,000	Francis Plain

== See also ==
- Saint Helena at the Commonwealth Games
