= Danielle Treasure =

Barbadian swimmer (born 2003)

Personal information
- Nationality: Barbadian
- Born: 3 September 2003 (age 22)

Sport
- Sport: Swimming

Danielle Treasure (born 3 September 2003) is a Barbadian swimmer. She competed in the women's 200 metre backstroke event at the 2018 FINA World Swimming Championships (25 m), in Hangzhou, China. In 2019, she represented Barbados at the 2019 World Aquatics Championships in Gwangju, South Korea. She competed in the women's 200 metre freestyle and women's 400 metre freestyle events.
