= List of Scottish records in swimming =

Scottish records in swimming are ratified by Scottish's governing body in swimming, Scottish Swimming. Records can be set in long course (50 metres) or short course (25 metres) swimming pools, with records currently recorded in the following events for both men and women.

- Freestyle: 50 m, 100 m, 200 m, 400 m, 800 m, 1500 m
- Backstroke: 50 m, 100 m, 200 m
- Breaststroke: 50 m, 100 m, 200 m
- Butterfly: 50 m, 100 m, 200 m
- Individual medley: 100 m (short course only), 200 m, 400 m
- Relays: 4×50 m freestyle (short course only), 4 × 100 m freestyle, 4 × 200 m freestyle, 4×50 m freestyle (short course only), 4 × 100 m medley

Records can be set at intermediate distances in an individual race and for the first leg of a relay race.

The ratification process involves submission of an application by the swimmer to Scottish Swimming detailing the name(s) of the swimmer, time swum, date and location of the swim, names of officials and the swimsuit model worn. Upon ratification, the records appear on the official records listing. Records which have not yet been fully ratified are marked with a '#' symbol in these lists, and all records were achieved in finals unless otherwise noted.

== Long course (50 m) ==
=== Men ===
Event	Time		Name	Club	Date	Meet	Location	Ref
50 m freestyle	22.21		Duncan Scott	University of Stirling	14 March 2020	Edinburgh International Meet	Edinburgh, Great Britain	
100 m freestyle	47.87	=	Duncan Scott	University of Stirling	18 April 2019	British Championships	Glasgow, Great Britain	
100 m freestyle	47.87	=	Duncan Scott	University of Stirling	16 April 2021	British Swimming Selection Trials	London, Great Britain	
200 m freestyle	1:44.26		Duncan Scott	Great Britain	27 July 2021	Olympic Games	Tokyo, Japan	
400 m freestyle	3:46.00	h	Stephen Milne	Great Britain	6 August 2016	Olympic Games	Rio de Janeiro, Brazil	
800 m freestyle	7:46.41	h	Stephen Milne	Great Britain	4 August 2015	World Championships	Kazan, Russia	
1500 m freestyle	14:53.83		Stephen Milne	Great Britain	20 August 2014	European Championships	Berlin, Germany	
50 m backstroke	24.75		Matthew Ward	Scotland	25 July 2026	Commonwealth Games	Glasgow, United Kingdom	
100 m backstroke	53.52		Matthew Ward	Bath PC	17 April 2025	British Championships	London, United Kingdom	
200 m backstroke	1:55.67		Craig McNally	Great Britain	2 August 2013	World Championships	Barcelona, Spain	
50 m breaststroke	27.12		Archie Goodburn	University of Edinburgh	13 February 2026	BUCS Championships	Sheffield, Great Britain	
100 m breaststroke	59.09		Ross Murdoch	Great Britain	3 August 2015	World Championships	Kazan, Russia	
200 m breaststroke	2:07.30		Ross Murdoch	Scotland	24 July 2014	Commonwealth Games	Glasgow, Great Britain	
50 m butterfly	23.29		Dean Fearn	Great Britain	6 July 2025	European Junior Championships	Šamorín, Slovakia	
100 m butterfly	52.25		Duncan Scott	University of Stirling	19 April 2019	British Championships	Glasgow, Great Britain	
200 m butterfly	1:54.89		Duncan Scott	University of Stirling	16 April 2025	British Championships	London, United Kingdom	
200 m individual medley	1:55.28	CR	Duncan Scott	Great Britain	30 July 2021	Olympic Games	Tokyo, Japan	
400 m individual medley	4:09.18		Duncan Scott	University of Stirling	7 April 2022	British Championships	Sheffield, Great Britain	
4×50m freestyle relay	1:32.94		Richard Schafers; Patrick MacLachlan; Greg Watson; David Cumberlidge	Edinburgh University	24 January 2016	-	Edinburgh, Great Britain	
4×100m freestyle relay	3:15.27		Evan Jones (49.26); Duncan Scott (47.48); Matthew Ward (49.27); Dean Fearn (49.26)	Scotland	24 July 2026	Commonwealth Games	Glasgow, Scotland	
4×100m freestyle relay	3:25.64	Club	Kieran McGuckin (50.80); Matthew Parks (51.97); James Thomson (52.46); Jack Thorpe (50.41)	University of Edinburgh	15 June 2013	Scottish Championships	Glasgow, Great Britain	
4×200m freestyle relay	7:06.31	h	Stephen Milne (1:46.70); Robert Renwick (1:48.17); Daniel Wallace (1:46.39); Duncan Scott (1:45.05)	Great Britain	9 August 2016	Olympic Games	Rio de Janeiro, Brazil	
4×200m freestyle relay	7:34.63	Club	Alasdair Stirling (1:54.46); Andrew Donaldson (1:54.79); Ian Porteous (1:54.89); Robert Renwick (1:50.49)	City of Glasgow	1 July 2011	Scottish Championships	Glasgow, United Kingdom	
4×50m medley relay	1:42.11		Stuart McIntosh (26.98); Mark Campbell (27.70); Robert Bryce (24.66); Eddie Watson (22.77)	Aberdeen Dolphins	4 February 2018	North District Age Group Championships	Aberdeen, Great Britain	
4×100m medley relay	3:34.67		Matthew Ward (53.73); Archie Goodburn (1:00.25); Dean Fearn (52.31); Duncan Scott (48.38)	Scotland	29 July 2026	Commonwealth Games	Glasgow, United Kingdom	
4×100m medley relay	3:39.98	Club	Zach Speakman; Rory Dickson; Jamie Robertson; Arun Oelkers	University of Stirling	26 July 2024	-	Sheffield, Great Britain	

Legend: # – Record awaiting ratification by Scottish Swimming; e – equalled existing record; BR – British record; Club – Scottish club record;
Records not set in finals: h – heat; sf – semifinal; r – relay 1st leg; rh – relay heat 1st leg; b – B final; † – en route to final mark; so – swim-off; tt – time trial

=== Women ===
Event	Time		Name	Club	Date	Meet	Location	Ref
50m freestyle	24.68	h	Alison Sheppard	Scotland	2 August 2002	Commonwealth Games	Manchester, Great Britain	
100m freestyle	53.89	r	Lucy Hope	Great Britain	17 May 2021	European Championships	Budapest, Hungary	
200m freestyle	1:56.97	h	Caitlin McClatchey	Great Britain	11 August 2008	Olympic Games	Beijing, China	
400m freestyle	4:06.21		Hannah Miley	Scotland	29 July 2014	Commonwealth Games	Glasgow, Great Britain	
800m freestyle	8:28.15		Hannah Miley	Scotland	28 July 2014	Commonwealth Games	Glasgow, Great Britain	
1500m freestyle	16:16.72		Camilla Hattersley	Co Glasgow	3 July 2016	Scottish Championships	Glasgow, Great Britain	
50m backstroke	27.19	sf	Kathleen Dawson	Great Britain	18 May 2021	European Championships	Budapest, Hungary	
100m backstroke	58.08	r, ER	Kathleen Dawson	Great Britain	23 May 2021	European Championships	Budapest, Hungary	
200m backstroke	2:07.45		Katie Shanahan	Great Britain	29 July 2023	World Championships	Fukuoka, Japan	
200m backstroke	2:06.13	#	Katie Shanahan	Great Britain	11 August 2026	European Championships	Paris, France	
50m breaststroke	30.50		Kara Hanlon	University of Edinburgh	4 April 2023	British Championships	Sheffield, Great Britain	
100m breaststroke	1:04.96		Angharad Evans	University of Stirling	19 April 2026	British Championships	London, United Kingdom	
100m breaststroke	1:04.87	#	Angharad Evans	Great Britain	12 August 2026	European Championships	Paris, France	
200m breaststroke	2:19.70		Angharad Evans	University of Stirling	16 April 2026	British Championships	London, United Kingdom	
50m butterfly	26.38		Ciara Schlosshan	University of Edinburgh	17 April 2026	British Championships	London, United Kingdom	
100m butterfly	57.33		Keanna MacInnes	Scotland	27 July 2026	Commonwealth Games	Glasgow, United Kingdom	
100m butterfly	57.25	#	Keanna MacInnes	Great Britain	14 August 2026	European Championships	Paris, France	
200m butterfly	2:06.76		Keanna MacInnes	Scotland	29 July 2026	Commonwealth Games	Glasgow, United Kingdom	
200m butterfly	2:05.90	#	Keanna MacInnes	Great Britain	16 August 2026	European Championships	Paris, France	
200m individual medley	2:09.40		Katie Shanahan	University of Stirling	9 April 2023	British Championships	Sheffield, Great Britain	
400m individual medley	4:31.33		Hannah Miley	Garioch	20 March 2009	British Championships	Sheffield, United Kingdom	
4×100m freestyle relay	3:39.03		Evelyn Davis (54.32); Emma Wood (54.84); Lucy Hope (55.22); Katie Shanahan (54.65)	Scotland	24 July 2026	Commonwealth Games	Glasgow, United Kingdom	
4×100m freestyle relay	3:49.54	Club	Hayley Monteith (57.98); Caitlin McClatchey (55.67); Jessica Wilkie (58.70); Kathryn Johnstone (57.19)	University of Edinburgh	15 June 2013	Scottish Championships	Glasgow, United Kingdom	
4×200m freestyle relay	7:59.06		Caitlin McClatchey (1:58.54); Hannah Miley (1:58.18); Megan Gilchrist (2:02.24); Rachel Masson (2:00.10)	Scotland	26 July 2014	Commonwealth Games	Glasgow, United Kingdom	
4×200m freestyle relay	8:24.39	Club	Jessica Wilkie (2:06.68); Emma Bird (2:07.53); Amy Harper (2:05.32); Sarah Eaglesham (2:04.86)	University of Edinburgh	28 June 2012	Scottish Championships	Edinburgh, United Kingdom	
4×100m medley relay	3:57.02		Katie Shanahan (1:00.66); Angharad Evans (1:04.83); Keanna MacInnes (57.67); Evie Davis (53.86)	Scotland	29 July 2026	Commonwealth Games	Glasgow, United Kingdom	

Legend: # – Record awaiting ratification by Scottish Swimming; e – equalled existing record; BR – British record; Club – Scottish club record;
Records not set in finals: h – heat; sf – semifinal; r – relay 1st leg; rh – relay heat 1st leg; b – B final; † – en route to final mark; so – swim-off; tt – time trial

=== Mixed relay ===
Event	Time	Name	Club	Date	Meet	Location	Ref
4×100 m freestyle relay	3:26.20	Evan Jones (49.41); Duncan Scott (47.66); Evelyn Davis (53.96); Katie Shanahan (55.17)	Scotland	25 July 2026	Commonwealth Games	Glasgow, United Kingdom	
4×100 m medley relay	3:43.70	Matthew Ward (53.55); Angharad Evans (1:04.52); Keanna MacInnes (57.60); Duncan Scott (48.03)	Scotland	28 July 2026	Commonwealth Games	Glasgow, United Kingdom	

Legend: # – Record awaiting ratification by Scottish Swimming; e – equalled existing record;
Records not set in finals: h – heat; sf – semifinal; r – relay 1st leg; rh – relay heat 1st leg; b – B final; † – en route to final mark; so – swim-off; tt – time trial

== Short course (25 m) ==
=== Men ===
Event	Time		Name	Club	Date	Meet	Location	Ref
50m freestyle	21.25		Duncan Scott	University of Stirling	4 December 2019	-	Glasgow, United Kingdom	<
100m freestyle	46.09		Duncan Scott	London Roar	21 December 2019	International Swimming League	Las Vegas, United States	
200m freestyle	1:39.83	CR	Duncan Scott	Great Britain	2 November 2024	World Cup	Incheon, South Korea	
400m freestyle	3:34.46	CR	Duncan Scott	Great Britain	31 October 2024	World Cup	Singapore, Singapore	
800m freestyle	7:44.58		Graeme Smith	Great Britain	3 August 2001	Australian Championships	Perth, Australia	
1500m freestyle	14:36.55		Stephen Milne	Perth	12 December 2015	Scottish Championships	Edinburgh, United Kingdom	
50m backstroke	23.60		Matthew Ward	Bath PC	13 December 2025	Scottish Championships	Edinburgh, United Kingdom	
100m backstroke	51.08		Matthew Ward	Bath PC	14 December 2025	Scottish Championships	Edinburgh, United Kingdom	
200m backstroke	1:50.37		Matthew Ward	Bath PC	12 December 2025	Scottish Championships	Edinburgh, United Kingdom	
50m breaststroke	26.26	=	Ross Murdoch	University of Stirling	13 December 2019	Scottish Championships	Edinburgh, Great Britain	
50m breaststroke	26.26	sf, =	Archie Goodburn	Great Britain	9 December 2023	European Championships	Otopeni, Romania	
100m breaststroke	56.67		Ross Murdoch	University of Stirling	14 December 2019	Scottish Championships	Edinburgh, Great Britain	
200m breaststroke	2:01.43	CR	Michael Jamieson	Great Britain	15 December 2013	European Championships	Herning, Denmark	
50m butterfly	23.24		Brodie Gordon-Gibson	Edinburgh University	15 November 2025	BUCS Championships	Sheffield, United Kingdom	
100m butterfly	50.80		Evan Jones	Manchester PC	13 December 2025	Swim England National Winter Championships	Sheffield, United Kingdom	
200m butterfly	1:54.43		Duncan Scott	University of Stirling	17 November 2019	BUCS Championships	Sheffield, Great Britain	
100m individual medley	51.14		Duncan Scott	Great Britain	18 October 2024	World Cup	Shanghai, China	
200m individual medley	1:50.98		Duncan Scott	Great Britain	8 December 2023 (Note: by official result source; 5 December by Scottish Swimming, a typo)	European Championships	Otopeni, Romania	
400m individual medley	3:59.81		Duncan Scott	London Roar	20 December 2019	International Swimming League	Las Vegas, United States	
4×50m freestyle relay	1:24.61	Club	Duncan Scott (21.44); Martyn Walton (21.34); Scott McLay (20.85); Craig McLean (20.98)	University of Stirling	14 December 2019	Scottish Championships	Edinburgh, Great Britain	
4×100m freestyle relay	3:11.37	Club	Duncan Scott (47.37); Craig McLean (47.75); Martyn Walton (47.86); Callum Lawrie (48.39)	University of Stirling	8 December 2018	Scottish Championships	Edinburgh, Great Britain	
4×200m freestyle relay	7:12.77	Club	Iain Macmillan (1.48.04); Alistair Brown (1.46.99); Michael Jamieson (1.51.30); Kristopher Gilchrist (1.46.44)	University of Edinburgh	7 August 2009	British Grand Prix	Leeds, Great Britain	
4×50m medley relay	1:33.52	Club	Martyn Walton (23.80); Ross Murdoch (26.02); Duncan Scott (22.53); Scott McLay (21.17)	University of Stirling	13 December 2019	Scottish Championships	Edinburgh, Great Britain	
4×100m medley relay	3:34.22	Club	Kieran McGuckin (53.41); Calum Tait (59.47); Craig Bowman (53.24); Jack Thorpe (48.10)	University of Edinburgh	17 December 2015	National Winter Meet	Sheffield, Great Britain	

Legend: # – Record awaiting ratification by Scottish Swimming; CR – Commonwealth record; e – equalled existing record; Club – Scottish club record;
Records not set in finals: h – heat; sf – semifinal; r – relay 1st leg; rh – relay heat 1st leg; b – B final; † – en route to final mark; so – swim-off; tt – time trial

=== Women ===
Event	Time		Name	Club	Date	Meet	Location	Ref
50m freestyle	24.06		Alison Sheppard	Great Britain	25 January 2003	World Cup	Berlin, Germany	
100m freestyle	52.83	r	Lucy Hope	Energy Standard	21 November 2020	International Swimming League	Budapest, Hungary	
200m freestyle	1:55.15		Caitlin McClatchey	Great Britain	13 April 2008	World Championships	Manchester, Great Britain	
400m freestyle	4:00.39		Hannah Miley	Great Britain	24 November 2012	European Championships	Chartres, France	
800m freestyle	8:15.66		Hannah Miley	Great Britain	23 November 2012	European Championships	Chartres, France	
1500m freestyle	16:17.05		Hannah Miley	Garioch ASC	4 November 2012	North District Distance Meet	Westhill, Great Britain	
50m backstroke	26.42		Kathleen Dawson	Great Britain	10 December 2016	World Championships	Windsor, Canada	
100m backstroke	56.73		Kathleen Dawson	Great Britain	7 December 2016	World Championships	Windsor, Canada	
200m backstroke	2:02.79		Katie Shanahan	Great Britain	3 December 2025	European Championships	Lublin, Poland	
50m breaststroke	29.92	h	Angharad Evans	Great Britain	14 December 2024	World Championships	Budapest, Hungary	
100m breaststroke	1:03.45	h	Angharad Evans	Great Britain	11 December 2024	World Championships	Budapest, Hungary	
200m breaststroke	2:18.77		Angharad Evans	Great Britain	13 December 2024	World Championships	Budapest, Hungary	
50m butterfly	25.78		Lucy Grieve	University of Stirling	12 December 2025	Scottish Championships	Edinburgh, United Kingdom	
100m butterfly	56.17		Lucy Grieve	University of Stirling	13 December 2025	Scottish Championships	Edinburgh, United Kingdom	
200m butterfly	2:05.26		Keanna MacInnes	University of Stirling	14 December 2025	Scottish Championships	Edinburgh, United Kingdom	
100m individual medley	59.72		Katie Shanahan	University of Stirling	16 November 2025	BUCS Championships	Sheffield, United Kingdom	
200m individual medley	2:06.21		Hannah Miley	Great Britain	22 November 2012	European Championships	Chartres, France	
400m individual medley	4:23.14		Hannah Miley	Great Britain	12 December 2012	World Championships	Istanbul, Turkey	
4×50m freestyle relay	1:40.06	Club	Katherine Renfrew (25.10); Ciara Schlosshan (25.21); Katie Goodburn (25.03); Morgan Brophy (25.05)	University of Edinburgh	15 November 2025	BUCS Championships	Sheffield, United Kingdom	
4×100m freestyle relay	3:38.64	Club	Tain Bruce (55.25); Sophie Smith (54.64); Rachel Masson (55.45); Lucy Hope (53.30)	Edinburgh	3 November 2019	North Sea Meet	Stavanger, Norway	
4×200m freestyle relay	8:34.98	Club		Tayside Swim Team	7 March 2004	Scottish Championships	Glasgow, Great Britain	
4×50m medley relay	1:47.37	Club	Katie Shanahan (27.49); Angharad Evans (29.75); Keanna MacInnes (25.42); Evie Davis (24.71)	University of Stirling	19 November 2023	BUCS Championships	Sheffield, Great Britain	
4×100m medley relay	4:09.51	Club	Fiona Booth (1:03.16); Louise Henley (1:11.30); Louise Pate (58.53); Kathryn Johnstone (56.52)	University of Edinburgh	9 August 2009	British Grand Prix	Leeds, Great Britain	

Legend: # – Record awaiting ratification by Scottish Swimming; e – equalled existing record; BR – British record; Club – Scottish club record;
Records not set in finals: h – heat; sf – semifinal; r – relay 1st leg; rh – relay heat 1st leg; b – B final; † – en route to final mark; so – swim-off; tt – time trial

=== Mixed relay ===
Event	Time	Name	Club	Date	Meet	Location	Ref
4×50 m freestyle relay	1:35.36	Richard Schafers (22.12); Lucy Hope (25.57); Lauren Averell (25.69); Mark Szaranek (21.98)	Scotland 2	14 December 2013	Scottish Championships	Edinburgh, Great Britain	
4×50 m medley relay	1:44.53	Rory Lamont (24.56); Kathryn Johnstone (30.73); Daniel Scott (24.01); Eloise Barber (25.23)	Scotland 3	15 December 2013	Scottish Championships	Edinburgh, Great Britain	

Legend: # – Record awaiting ratification by Scottish Swimming; e – equalled existing record;
Records not set in finals: h – heat; sf – semifinal; r – relay 1st leg; rh – relay heat 1st leg; b – B final; † – en route to final mark; so – swim-off; tt – time trial

== Gallery ==
Some of the current Scottish record holders:

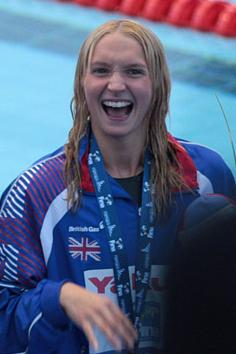
Caitlin McClatchey, current long and short course record holder in the 200 metre freestyle.

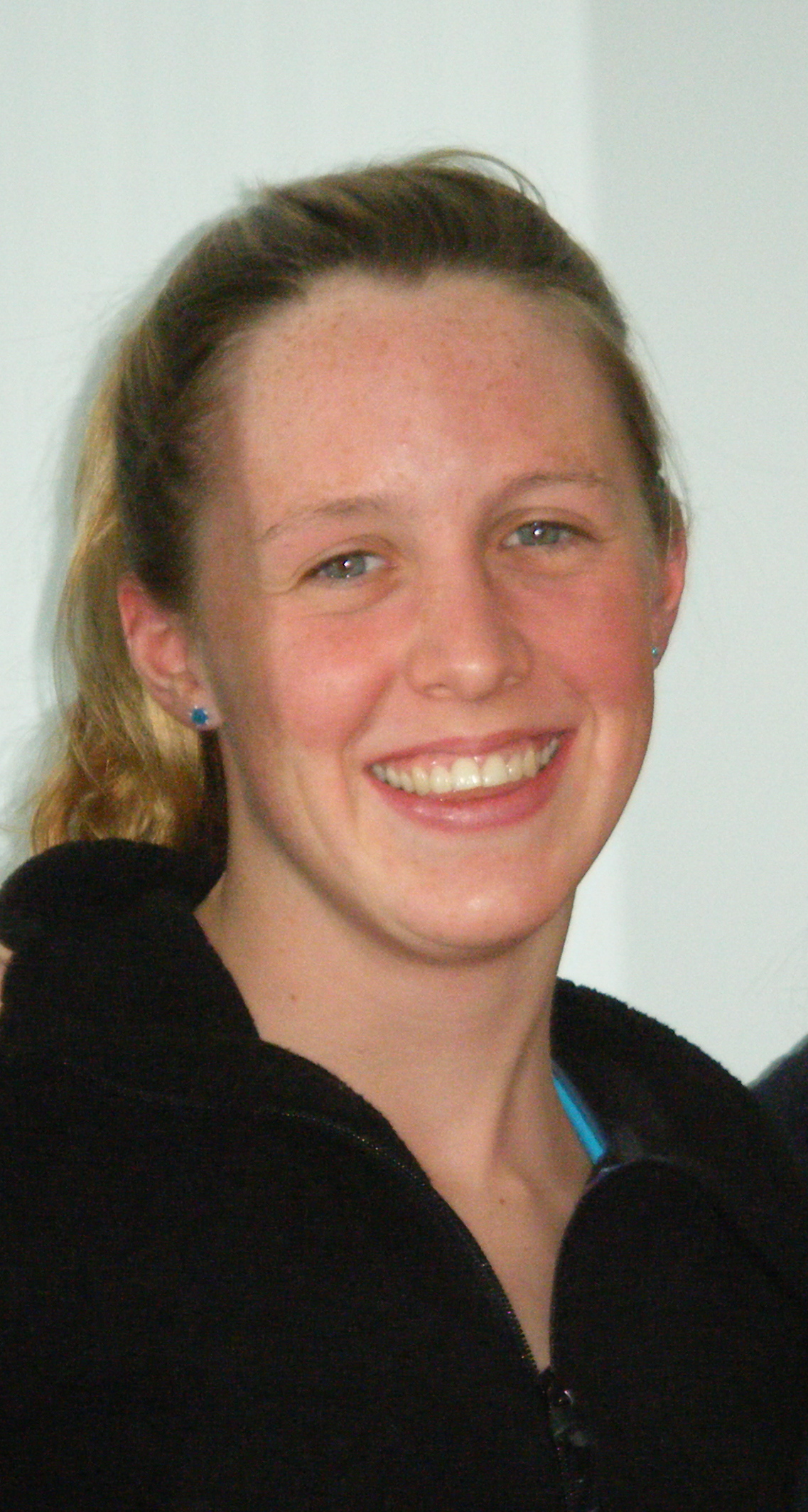
Hannah Miley, current long course and short course record holder in the 400 and 800 metre freestyle and 400 metre individual medley, as well as the short course record holder in 1500 metre freestyle, 200 metre breaststroke and the 200 metre individual medley.
