= 2022 British Swimming Championships =

- Venue: Ponds Forge International Sports Centre
- Location: Sheffield
- Start date: 5 April
- End date: 10 April

The 2022 British Swimming Championships were held at the Ponds Forge International Sports Centre in Sheffield, from 5 April to the 10 April 2022. They also doubled as the trials for the 2022 Commonwealth Games and the World Championships. They were organised by British Swimming.

== Medal winners ==
=== Men's events ===
Event	Gold		Silver		Bronze	
50 m freestyle	Lewis Burras; Winchester	21.77	Ben Proud; University of Bath	21.91	Adam Barrett; Wycombe District	22.52
100 m freestyle	Lewis Burras; Winchester	47.88	Tom Dean; Bath National Centre	48.06	Jacob Whittle; Derventio Excel	48.24
200 m freestyle	Duncan Scott; University of Stirling	1:45.54	Tom Dean; Bath National Centre	1:45.73	James Guy; Bath National Centre	1:46.44
400 m freestyle	Daniel Jervis; Swansea University	3:46.44	Luke Turley; Bath National Centre	3:48.52	Kieran Bird; Bath National Centre	3:48.58
800 m freestyle	Daniel Jervis; Swansea University	7:50.35	Luke Turley; Bath National Centre	7:54.52	Kieran Bird; Bath National Centre	7:55.95
1500 m freestyle	Daniel Jervis; Swansea University	14:58.63	Toby Robinson; Wolverhampton	15:12.24	Luke Turley; Bath National Centre	15:20.77
50 m backstroke	Sebastian Somerset; Loughborough University	25.30	Scott Gibson; University of Edinburgh	25.45	Liam White; Swansea University	25.46
100 m backstroke	Luke Greenbank; Loughborough National Centre	54.56	Brodie Williams; Bath National Centre	54.68	Jonathon Adam; Bath National Centre	54.75
200 m backstroke	Luke Greenbank; Loughborough National Centre	1:57.57	Brodie Williams; Bath National Centre	1:57.90	Jay Lelliott; City of Sheffield	1:58.80
50 m breaststroke	Adam Peaty; Loughborough National Centre	26.91	James Wilby; Loughborough National Centre	27.16	Craig Benson; City of Glasgow	27.55
100 m breaststroke	Adam Peaty; Loughborough National Centre	58.58	James Wilby; Loughborough National Centre	59.17	Greg Butler; Loughborough National Centre	1:00.04
200 m breaststroke	James Wilby; Loughborough National Centre	2:09.48	Adam Chillingworth; Plymouth Leander	2:12.17	Greg Butler; Loughborough National Centre	2:12.30
50 m butterfly	Ben Proud; University of Bath	23.09	Jacob Peters; Bath National Centre	23.47	Adam Barrett; Wycombe District	23.80
100 m butterfly	James Guy; Bath National Centre	51.69	Jacob Peters; Bath National Centre	51.93	Jamie Ingram; City of Manchester Aquatics	52.46
200 m butterfly	James Guy; Bath National Centre	1:56.31	Mason Wilby; Loughborough University	1:57.31	Jay Lelliott; City of Sheffield	1:57.77
200 m individual medley	Duncan Scott; University of Stirling	1:56.08	Tom Dean; Bath National Centre	1:57.18	James McFadzen; Loughborough University	1:59.60
400 m individual medley	Duncan Scott; University of Stirling	4:09.18 GBR	Brodie Williams; Bath National Centre	4:14.69	Jacob Greenow; University of Bath	4:18.41

=== Women's events ===
Event	Gold		Silver		Bronze	
50 m freestyle	Anna Hopkin; Loughborough National Centre	24.85	Isabella Hindley; Brompton	25.25	Evelyn Davis; Bromley	25.39
100 m freestyle	Anna Hopkin; Loughborough National Centre	53.45	Freya Anderson; Bath National Centre	53.92	Lucy Hope; University of Stirling	55.14
200 m freestyle	Abbie Wood; Loughborough National Centre	1:57.61	Freya Anderson; Bath National Centre	1:57.63	Freya Colbert; Nova Centurion	1:57.90
400 m freestyle	Freya Anderson; Bath National Centre	4:08.46	Freya Colbert; Nova Centurion	4:09.04	Mia Slevin; Derventio Excel	4:13.24
800 m freestyle	Leah Crisp; Bath National Centre	8:45.98	Fleur Lewis; Barnet Copthall	8:49.80	Ashleigh Baillie; City of Sheffield	8:51.34
1500 m freestyle	Fleur Lewis; Barnet Copthall	16:45.51	Amber Keegan; City of Sheffield	16:48.33	Leah Crisp; Bath National Centre	16:56.30
50 m backstroke	Lauren Cox; Loughborough University	27.83	Medi Harris; Swansea University	27.84	Kathleen Dawson; University of Stirling	28.31
100 m backstroke	Medi Harris; Swansea University	59.95	Lauren Cox; Loughborough University	1:00.84	Kathleen Dawson; University of Stirling	1:01.05
200 m backstroke	Katie Shanahan; City of Glasgow	2:11.25	Holly McGill; Heart of Midlothian	2:11.84	Honey Osrin; Loughborough University	2:12.12
50 m breaststroke	Imogen Clark; Derventio Excel	30.10	Sarah Vasey; Loughborough National Centre	31.02	Kara Hanlon; University of Edinburgh	31.13
100 m breaststroke	Kara Hanlon; University of Edinburgh	1:07.52	Sarah Vasey; Loughborough National Centre	1:07.60	Imogen Clark; Derventio Excel	1:07.63
200 m breaststroke	Abbie Wood; Loughborough National Centre	2:24.28	Lily Booker; Loughborough National Centre	2:27.34	Kara Hanlon; University of Edinburgh	2:27.61
50 m butterfly	Harriet Jones; City of Cardiff	26.48	Sophie Yendell; Derventio Excel	26.67	Georgina Pryor; Derventio Excel	26.77
100 m butterfly	Laura Stephens; Loughborough National Centre	58.43	Harriet Jones; City of Cardiff	59.10	Keanna Macinnes; University of Stirling	59.24
200 m butterfly	Laura Stephens; Loughborough National Centre	2:08.11	Keanna Macinnes; University of Stirling	2:10.02	Holly Hibbott; Bath National Centre	2:10.27
200 m individual medley	Abbie Wood; Loughborough National Centre	2:11.03	Lily Booker; Loughborough National Centre	2:13.41	Katie Shanahan; City of Glasgow	2:13.63
400 m individual medley	Freya Colbert; Nova Centurion	4:41.27	Lily Booker; Loughborough National Centre	4:43.96	Katie Shanahan; City of Glasgow	4:44.01

== See also ==
- List of British Swimming Championships champions
