= 2023 British Swimming Championships =

- Venue: Ponds Forge International Sports Centre
- Location: Sheffield
- Start date: 4 April
- End date: 9 April

The 2023 British Swimming Championships were held at the Ponds Forge International Sports Centre in Sheffield, from 4 April to 9 April 2023. They also doubled as the trials for the World Championships. They were organised by British Swimming.

== Medal winners ==
=== Men's events ===
Event	Gold		Silver		Bronze	
50 m freestyle	Ben Proud; University of Bath	21.71	Lewis Burras; Repton	21.92	Matthew Richards; Millfield	21.98
100 m freestyle	Lewis Burras; Repton	47.99	Duncan Scott; University of Stirling	48.00	Matthew Richards; Millfield	48.02
200 m freestyle	Matthew Richards; Millfield	1:44.83	Tom Dean; Bath Performance Centre	1:44.93	James Guy; Bath Performance Centre	1:45.85
400 m freestyle	Luke Turley; Bath Performance Centre	3:48.31	Kieran Bird; Bath Performance Centre	3:48.61	Charlie Hutchison; Loughborough Performance Centre	3:52.41
800 m freestyle	Daniel Jervis; Swansea University	7:47.81	Luke Turley; Bath Performance Centre	7:52.10	Toby Robinson; Loughborough University	7:56.86
1500 m freestyle	Daniel Jervis; Swansea University	14:46.95	Toby Robinson; Loughborough University	15:04.76	Nathan Hughes; Swansea University	15:29.63
50 m backstroke	Oliver Morgan; University of Birmingham	24.84	Sebastian Somerset; Loughborough University	25.21	Cameron Brooker; Bath Performance Centre	25.23
100 m backstroke	Oliver Morgan; University of Birmingham	53.92	Cameron Brooker; Bath Performance Centre	53.94	Luke Greenbank; Loughborough Performance Centre	54.30
200 m backstroke	Oliver Morgan; University of Birmingham	1:57.17	Brodie Williams; Bath Performance Centre	1:57.18	Luke Greenbank; Loughborough Performance Centre	1:57.67
50 m breaststroke	Archie Goodburn; University of Edinburgh	27.24	James Wilby; Loughborough Performance Centre	27.62	Greg Butler; Loughborough Performance Centre	27.76
100 m breaststroke	James Wilby; Loughborough Performance Centre	59.94	Greg Butler; Loughborough Performance Centre	1:00.03	Archie Goodburn; University of Edinburgh	1:00.20
200 m breaststroke	James Wilby; Loughborough Performance Centre	2:09.88	Greg Butler; Loughborough Performance Centre	2:10.69	George Smith; University of Stirling	2:13.10
50 m butterfly	Jacob Peters; Bath Performance Centre	22.89	Ben Proud; University of Bath	23.37	Lewis Fraser; Swansea University	23.62
100 m butterfly	Jacob Peters; Bath Performance Centre	51.16	James Guy; Bath Performance Centre	51.63	Jamie Ingram; City of Manchester Aquatics	51.98
200 m butterfly	Joshua Gammon; University of Bath	1:58.88	Thomas Beeley; University of Aberdeen Performance	1:58.99	Reuben Rowbotham-Keating; City of Manchester Aquatics	2:00.83
200 m individual medley	Tom Dean; Bath Performance Centre	1:56.65	Duncan Scott; University of Stirling	1:56.72	Mark Szaranek; Carnegie	2:00.59
400 m individual medley	Charlie Hutchison; Loughborough Performance Centre	4:17.89	William Ryley; City of Cardiff	4:19.11	Mark Szaranek; Carnegie	4:19.56

=== Women's events ===
Event	Gold		Silver		Bronze	
50 m freestyle	Anna Hopkin; Loughborough Performance Centre	24.51	Rebecca Guy; Bristol Henleaze	25.30	Eva Okaro; Sevenoaks	25.36
100 m freestyle	Freya Anderson; Bath Performance Centre	53.48	Anna Hopkin; Loughborough Performance Centre	53.52	Lucy Hope; University of Stirling	54.34
200 m freestyle	Freya Anderson; Bath Performance Centre	1:55.89	Abbie Wood; Loughborough Performance Centre	1:57.21	Lucy Hope; University of Stirling	1:58.03
400 m freestyle	Freya Colbert; Loughborough Performance Centre	4:06.80	Leah Crisp; Bath Performance Centre	4:12.85	Shannon Stott; Hatfield	4:13.87
800 m freestyle	Freya Colbert; Loughborough Performance Centre	8:35.02	Amelie Blocksidge; City of Salford	8:38.33	Fleur Lewis; Loughborough University	8:40.14
1500 m freestyle	Amelie Blocksidge; City of Salford	16:19.67	Fleur Lewis; Loughborough University	16:25.78	Michaella Glenister; University of Stirling	16:44.51
50 m backstroke	Lauren Cox; Loughborough University	27.81	Medi Harris; Swansea University	27.86	Blythe Kinsman; Mount Kelly	28.32
100 m backstroke	Medi Harris; Swansea University	59.82	Lauren Cox; Loughborough University	1:00.01	Kathleen Dawson; University of Stirling	1:00.50
200 m backstroke	Katie Shanahan; University of Stirling	2:07.81	Freya Colbert; Loughborough Performance Centre	2:08.73	Evie Dilley; Millfield	2:12.70
50 m breaststroke	Kara Hanlon; University of Edinburgh	30.50	Sienna Robinson; City of Sheffield	31.46	Angharad Evans; West Suffolk	31.72
100 m breaststroke	Kara Hanlon; University of Edinburgh	1:06.83	Imogen Clark; Derventio Excel	1:07.92	Angharad Evans; West Suffolk	1:08.05
200 m breaststroke	Gillian Kay Davey; Loughborough University	2:25.07	Kara Hanlon; University of Edinburgh	2:25.12	Lily Booker; Loughborough Performance Centre	2:25.96
50 m butterfly	Sophie Yendell; Derventio Excel	26.16	Harriet Jones; City of Cardiff	26.49	Lucy Grieve; University of Stirling	26.83
100 m butterfly	Keanna Macinnes; University of Stirling	57.97	Laura Stephens; Loughborough Performance Centre	58.14	Harriet Jones; City of Cardiff	58.49
200 m butterfly	Laura Stephens; Loughborough Performance Centre	2:06.62	Emily Large; Millfield	2:07.33	Keanna Macinnes; University of Stirling	2:08.05
200 m individual medley	Katie Shanahan; University of Stirling	2:09.40	Abbie Wood; Loughborough Performance Centre	2:09.46	Leah Schlosshan; City of Leeds	2:11.72
400 m individual medley	Freya Colbert; Loughborough Performance Centre	4:35.50	Katie Shanahan; University of Stirling	4:36.74	Leah Schlosshan; City of Leeds	4:46.40

== See also ==
- List of British Swimming Championships champions
