= British swimming champions – 200 metres breaststroke winners =

Annual British swimming event

The British swimming champions over 200 metres breaststroke, formerly the (Amateur Swimming Association (ASA) National Championships) are listed below. The event was originally contested over 220 yards and then switched to the metric conversion of 200 metres in 1971.

In 1962 Anita Lonsbrough set a world record of 2.52.2 sec in the final.

== 200 metres breaststroke champions ==
Year	Men's champion	Women's champion
	220 yards	220 yards
1946	Goldup Davies	
1947	Roy Romain	Elizabeth Church
1948	Roy Romain	Elizabeth Church
1949	Roy Romain	Hanne Caspers
1950	Peter Jervis	Elenor Gordon
1951	Derek Snelling	Elenor Gordon
1952	Peter Jervis	Elenor Gordon
1953	Peter Jervis	Margaret Grundy
1954	Peter Jervis	Margaret Grundy
1955	Chris Walkden	Elenor Gordon
1956	Chris Walkden	Elenor Gordon
1957	Brian Day	Christine Gosden
1958	Chris Walkden	Anita Lonsbrough
1959	Gerard Rowlinson	Anita Lonsbrough
1960	Gerard Rowlinson	Anita Lonsbrough
1961	Chris Wilkinson	Anita Lonsbrough
1962	Chris Wilkinson	Anita Lonsbrough
1963	Neil Nicholson	Stella Mitchell
1964	Basil Hotz	Stella Mitchell
1965	Basil Hotz	Stella Mitchell
1966	David Finnigan	Stella Mitchell
1967	Roger Roberts	Jill Slattery
1968	Stuart Roberts	Jill Slattery
1969	Bill Mahony	Dorothy Harrison
1970	Nigel Johnson	Dorothy Harrison
	200 metres	200 metres
1971	Malcolm O'Connell	Dorothy Harrison
1972		Jean Jeavons
1973	David Wilkie	Caroline Tamlyn
1974	David Wilkie	Marion Stuart
1975	David Wilkie	Helen Burnham
1976	Duncan Goodhew	Debbie Rudd
1977	Paul Naisby	Margaret Kelly
1978	Duncan Goodhew	Margaret Kelly
1979		
1980	Duncan Goodhew	Margaret Kelly
1981	Adrian Moorhouse	Suki Brownsdon
1982	Adrian Moorhouse	Gaynor Stanley
1983	Adrian Moorhouse	Jackie Willmott
1984	Murray Buswell	Nina Herbert
1985	Adrian Moorhouse	
1986	Adrian Moorhouse	Suki Brownsdon
1987	Nick Gillingham	Suki Brownsdon
1988	Nick Gillingham	Suki Brownsdon
1989	Nick Gillingham	Suki Brownsdon
1990	Nick Gillingham	Suki Brownsdon
1991	Nick Gillingham	Jean Hill
1992	Nick Gillingham	Sharlene Brown
1993	Nick Gillingham	Marie Hardiman
1994	Alexander Clapper	Marie Hardiman
1995	Nick Gillingham	Marie Hardiman
1996	Jonny Tunstall	Linda Hindmarsh
1997	Richard Maden	Linda Hindmarsh
1998	Adam Whitehead	Linda Hindmarsh
1999	Adam Whitehead	Linda Hindmarsh
2000	Adam Whitehead	Heidi Earp
2001	Ian Edmond	Jaime King
2002	Ian Edmond	Jaime King
2003	Ian Edmond	Jaime King
2004	Ian Edmond	Kirsty Balfour
2005	Kristopher Gilchrist	Kirsty Balfour
2006	James Kirton	Kirsty Balfour
2007	Richard Webb	Kerry Buchan
2008	Kristopher Gilchrist	Georgina Holderness
2009	Kristopher Gilchrist	Hannah Miley
2010	Michael Jamieson	Stacey Tadd
2011	Michael Jamieson	Stacey Tadd
2012	Andrew Willis	Stacey Tadd
2013	Michael Jamieson	Stacey Tadd
2014	Michael Jamieson	Sophie Taylor
2015	Adam Peaty	Molly Renshaw
2016	Andrew Willis	Chloé Tutton
2017	Ross Murdoch	Jocelyn Ulyett
2018	James Wilby	Jessica Vall
2019	James Wilby	Molly Renshaw
Not held during 2020 and 2021 due to the COVID-19 pandemic
2022	James Wilby	Abbie Wood
2023	James Wilby	Gillian Kay Davey
2024	James Wilby	Kara Hanlon
2025	Greg Butler	Angharad Evans
2026	Filip Nowacki	Angharad Evans

== See also ==
- Aquatics GB
- List of British Swimming champions
