= Swimming at the 2022 Commonwealth Games – Mixed 4 × 100 metre medley relay =

Event which was part of the 2022 Commonwealth Games

Mixed 4 × 100 metre medley relay at the 2022 Commonwealth Games
- Venue: Sandwell Aquatics Centre
- Dates: 2 August
- Competitors: 89 from 17 nations
- Winning time: 3:41.30

Medalists
| gold medal | Kaylee McKeown; Zac Stubblety-Cook; Matthew Temple; Emma McKeon; Mitch Larkin*; Sam Williamson*; Alexandria Perkins*; Madison Wilson* | Australia |
| silver medal | Kylie Masse; James Dergousoff; Maggie Mac Neil; Ruslan Gaziev; Javier Acevedo*; Sophie Angus*; Patrick Hussey*; Rebecca Smith* | Canada |
| bronze medal | Lauren Cox; James Wilby; James Guy; Freya Anderson; Alicia Wilson*; Greg Butler*; Edward Mildred*; Abbie Wood* | England |

The mixed 4 × 100 metre medley relay event at the 2022 Commonwealth Games will be held on 2 August at the Sandwell Aquatics Centre.

== Records ==
Prior to this competition, the existing world, Commonwealth and Games records were as follows:

| Record | Time | Athlete (nation) | Meet | Location | Date | Ref |
|---|---|---|---|---|---|---|
| World record | 3:37.58 | Great Britain (GBR); Kathleen Dawson; Adam Peaty; James Guy; Anna Hopkin | | Tokyo, Japan | 31 July 2021 | |
| Commonwealth record | 3:37.58 | Great Britain (GBR); Kathleen Dawson; Adam Peaty; James Guy; Anna Hopkin | | Tokyo, Japan | 31 July 2021 | |
| Games record | | New event | | | | |

== Schedule ==
The schedule is as follows:

All times are British Summer Time (UTC+1)

| Date | Time | Round |
|---|---|---|
| Tuesday 2 August 2022 | 11:19 | Heats |
| Tuesday 2 August 2022 | 21:36 | Final |

== Results ==
=== Heats ===
| Rank | Heat | Lane | Nation | Swimmers | Time | Notes |
|---|---|---|---|---|---|---|
| 1 | 3 | 4 | Australia | Mitch Larkin (54.32); Sam Williamson (1:00.40); Alexandria Perkins (57.94); Madison Wilson (52.68) | 3:45.34 | Q, GR |
| 2 | 2 | 4 | England | Alicia Wilson (1:02.93); Greg Butler (1:01.45); Edward Mildred (51.58); Abbie Wood (55.12) | 3:51.08 | Q |
| 3 | 3 | 5 | Canada | Javier Acevedo (54.59); Sophie Angus (1:08.08); Patrick Hussey (53.44); Rebecca Smith (55.32) | 3:51.43 | Q |
| 4 | 2 | 5 | South Africa | Rebecca Meder (1:02.50); Brenden Crawford (1:00.70); Matthew Sates (53.57); Emma Chelius (54.79) | 3:51.56 | Q |
| 5 | 2 | 3 | Scotland | Martyn Walton (55.60); Archie Goodburn (1:01.60); Tain Bruce (59.80); Lucy Hope (55.32) | 3:52.32 | Q |
| 6 | 3 | 3 | Wales | Charlotte Evans (1:02.67); Kyle Booth (1:02.00); Harriet Jones (58.54); Liam White (49.84) | 3:53.05 | Q |
| 7 | 3 | 6 | Jersey | Gemma Atherley (1:03.73); Robbie Jones (1:03.86); Harry Shalamon (54.99); Lily Scott (57.91) | 4:00.49 | Q |
| 8 | 3 | 2 | Guernsey | Tatiana Tostevin (1:03.83); Ronny Hallett (1:05.37); Charlie-Joe Hallett (56.49); Orla Rabey (58.33) | 4:04.02 | Q |
| 9 | 2 | 6 | Isle of Man | Emma Hodgson (1:05.93); Laura Kinley (1:10.79); Peter Allen (56.20); Joel Watterson (51.67) | 4:04.59 | R |
| 10 | 2 | 2 | Barbados | Danielle Titus (1:05.06); Luis Sebastian Weekes (1:04.84); Adara Stoddard (1:07.82); Jack Kirby (50.87) | 4:08.59 | R, NR |
| 11 | 2 | 8 | Bahamas | Davante Carey (58.96); Lillian Higgs (1:13.22); Katelyn Cabral (1:05.67); Lamar Taylor (50.95) | 4:08.80 | NR |
| 12 | 3 | 7 | Cook Islands | Bede Aitu (1:00.91); Kirsten Fisher-Marsters (1:15.81); Lanihei Connolly (1:05.68); Wesley Roberts (50.69) | 4:13.09 | |
| 13 | 1 | 5 | Samoa | Lushavel Stickland (1:12.25); Brandon Schuster (1:04.33); Olivia Borg (1:01.20); Kokoro Frost (55.88) | 4:13.66 | NR |
| 14 | 3 | 8 | Kenya | Imara Thorpe (1:08.33); Emily Muteti (1:15.87); Ridhwan Mohamed (58.29); Monyo Maina (54.17) | 4:16.66 | |
| 15 | 3 | 1 | Uganda | Avice Meya (1:10.68); Tendo Mukalazi (1:08.54); Atuhaire Ambala (59.29); Kirabo Namutebi (59.53) | 4:18.04 | NR |
| 16 | 1 | 6 | Zambia | Kumaren Naidu (1:06.81); Zach Moyo (1:12.31); Jade Phiri (1:08.09); Tilka Paljk (1:03.22) | 4:30.43 | |
| 17 | 1 | 4 | Maldives | Aishath Sausan (1:21.70); Mohamed Aan Hussain (1:16.95); Mubal Azzam Ibrahim (1:06.09); Hamna Ahmed (1:12.48) | 4:57.22 | |
| | 1 | 3 | Singapore | | DNS | |
| | 2 | 1 | Saint Helena | | DNS | |
| | 2 | 7 | Fiji | | DNS | |

=== Final ===
| Rank | Lane | Nation | Swimmers | Time | Notes |
|---|---|---|---|---|---|
| 1st place, gold medalist(s) | 4 | Australia | Kaylee McKeown (59.01); Zac Stubblety-Cook (59.52); Matthew Temple (50.89); Emma McKeon (51.88) | 3:41.30 | GR |
| 2nd place, silver medalist(s) | 3 | Canada | Kylie Masse (59.11); James Dergousoff (1:00.57); Maggie Mac Neil (56.50); Ruslan Gaziev (47.80) | 3:43.98 | |
| 3rd place, bronze medalist(s) | 5 | England | Lauren Cox (1:00.81); James Wilby (58.94); James Guy (51.19); Freya Anderson (53.09) | 3:44.03 | |
| 4 | 6 | South Africa | Pieter Coetze (53.42); Lara van Niekerk (1:05.41); Chad le Clos (50.94); Aimee Canny (54.61) | 3:44.38 | AF |
| 5 | 7 | Wales | Medi Harris (59.48); Kyle Booth (1:01.68); Harriet Jones (58.26); Matt Richards (48.34) | 3:47.76 | |
| 6 | 2 | Scotland | Craig McNally (54.50); Ross Murdoch (59.45); Keanna Macinnes (59.52); Lucy Hope (55.08) | 3:48.55 | |
| 7 | 1 | Jersey | Gemma Atherley (1:04.21); Robbie Jones (1:03.78); Harry Shalamon (55.10); Lily Scott (58.01) | 4:01.10 | |
| 8 | 8 | Guernsey | Tatiana Tostevin (1:03.95); Ronny Hallett (1:04.45); Charlie-Joe Hallett (56.14); Orla Rabey (58.25) | 4:02.79 | |
