= British swimming champions – 50 metres butterfly winners =

British swimming event

The British swimming champions over 50 metres butterfly, formerly the (Amateur Swimming Association (ASA) National Championships) are listed below.

The event first appeared at the 1991 Championships.

== 50 metres butterfly champions ==
Year	Men's champion	Women's champion
1991	Mike Fibbens	Nicola Kennedy
1992	Mark Foster	Sharron Davies
1993	Mark Foster	Maxine Lock
1994	Mike Fibbens	Sue Rolph
1995	Mark Foster	Sarah Massey
1996	David Jones	Sarah Massey
1997	David Jones	Caroline Foot
1998	Mark Foster	Yvetta Hlaváčová
1999	Mark Foster	Nicola Jackson
2000	Mark Foster	Caroline Foot
2001	Mark Foster	Rosalind Brett
2002	Mark Foster	Rosalind Brett
2003	Mark Foster	Rosalind Brett
2004	N/A	N/A
2005	Mark Foster	Rosalind Brett
2006	Todd Cooper	Rosalind Brett
2007	Andrew Mayor & Owen Morgan	Ellen Gandy
Not held in 2008 and 2009
2010	Ian Hulme	Amy Smith
2011	Jack Marriott	Jessica Sylvester
Not held in 2012
2013	Ben Proud	Francesca Halsall
2014	Ben Proud	Francesca Halsall
2015	Ben Proud	Rachael Kelly
2016	N/A	N/A
2017	Ben Proud	Charlotte Atkinson
2018	James Guy	Harriet Jones
2019	Ben Proud	Charlotte Atkinson
Not held during 2020 and 2021 due to the COVID-19 pandemic
2022	Ben Proud	Harriet Jones
2023	Jacob Peters	Sophie Yendell
Not held during 2024 due to it being a non-Olympic event
2025	Ben Proud	Eva Okaro
2026	Joshua Gammon	Eva Okaro

== See also ==
- Aquatics GB
- List of British Swimming champions
