= Swimming at the 2022 Commonwealth Games – Men's 100 metre breaststroke =

Men's 100 metre breaststroke at the 2022 Commonwealth Games
- Venue: Sandwell Aquatics Centre
- Dates: 30 July (heats, semifinals); 31 July (final)
- Competitors: 36 from 24 nations
- Winning time: 59.25

Medalists
gold medal	James Wilby	England
silver medal	Zac Stubblety-Cook	Australia
bronze medal	Sam Williamson	Australia

The men's 100 metre breaststroke event at the 2022 Commonwealth Games will be held on 30 and 31 July at the Sandwell Aquatics Centre.

== Records ==
Prior to this competition, the existing world, Commonwealth and Games records were as follows:

World record	Adam Peaty (GBR)	56.88	Gwangju, South Korea	21 July 2019
Commonwealth record	Adam Peaty (GBR)	56.88	Gwangju, South Korea	21 July 2019
Games record	Adam Peaty (ENG)	58.59	Gold Coast, Australia	6 April 2018

== Schedule ==
The schedule is as follows:

All times are British Summer Time (UTC+1)

Date	Time	Round
Saturday 30 July 2022	11:05	Qualifying
Saturday 30 July 2022	20:03	Semifinals
Sunday 31 July 2022	20:51	Final

== Results ==
=== Heats ===
Rank	Heat	Lane	Name	Nationality	Time	Notes
1	5	4	Adam Peaty	England	59.92	Q
2	5	3	Sam Williamson	Australia	1:00.16	Q
3	3	4	Zac Stubblety-Cook	Australia	1:00.18	Q
4	4	4	James Wilby	England	1:00.62	Q
5	3	3	Archie Goodburn	Scotland	1:00.92	Q
6	4	5	Joshua Yong	Australia	1:00.93	Q
7	4	3	Ross Murdoch	Scotland	1:01.10	Q
8	5	2	Brenden Crawford	South Africa	1:01.11	Q
9	3	5	Craig Benson	Scotland	1:01.14	Q
10	5	7	Maximillian Ang Wei	Singapore	1:01.54	Q
11	5	5	Greg Butler	England	1:01.59	Q
12	5	6	Michael Houlie	South Africa	1:01.62	Q
13	3	6	James Dergousoff	Canada	1:01.79	Q
14	3	2	Kyle Booth	Wales	1:02.00	Q
15	3	1	Jadon Wuilliez	Antigua and Barbuda	1:02.38	Q, NR
16	3	7	Panayiotis Panaretos	Cyprus	1:02.83	Q
17	5	8	Adrian Robinson	Botswana	1:03.13	R, NR
18	4	2	Ronan Wantenaar	Namibia	1:03.14	R
19	2	8	Ryan Maskelyne	Papua New Guinea	1:03.31	NR
20	5	1	Taichi Vakasama	Fiji	1:03.53	
21	4	1	Charlie-Joe Hallett	Guernsey	1:03.82	
22	4	8	Robbie Jones	Jersey	1:04.06	
23	4	6	Izaak Bastian	Bahamas	1:04.07	
24	4	7	Bradley Newman	Wales	1:04.12	
25	3	8	Luis Sebastian Weekes	Barbados	1:04.96	
26	2	4	Kito Campbell	Jamaica	1:05.04	
27	2	6	Epeli Rabua	Fiji	1:05.25	
28	2	5	Ronny Hallett	Guernsey	1:05.85	
29	2	2	Caio Lobo	Mozambique	1:05.92	
30	2	3	Sukumar Rajbonashi	Bangladesh	1:07.92	
31	2	7	Shane Cadogan	Saint Vincent and the Grenadines	1:08.53	
32	1	5	Kumaren Naidu	Zambia	1:11.79	
33	1	4	Zach Moyo	Zambia	1:12.83	
34	2	1	Bryson George	Saint Vincent and the Grenadines	1:13.19	
35	1	3	Mubal Azzam Ibrahim	Maldives	1:17.19	
36	1	6	Alex Lake	Anguilla	1:19.00	

=== Semifinals ===
Rank	Heat	Lane	Name	Nationality	Time	Notes
1	2	4	Adam Peaty	England	59.02	Q
2	2	5	Zac Stubblety-Cook	Australia	59.80	Q
3	1	5	James Wilby	England	59.85	Q
4	1	4	Sam Williamson	Australia	59.98	Q
5	1	3	Joshua Yong	Australia	59.99	Q
6	2	6	Ross Murdoch	Scotland	1:00.36	Q
7	2	2	Craig Benson	Scotland	1:00.61	Q
8	1	6	Brenden Crawford	South Africa	1:00.64	Q
9	2	3	Archie Goodburn	Scotland	1:00.75	R
10	2	1	James Dergousoff	Canada	1:00.86	R
11	2	7	Greg Butler	England	1:00.90	
12	1	7	Michael Houlie	South Africa	1:01.24	
13	1	2	Maximillian Ang Wei	Singapore	1:01.42	
14	2	8	Jadon Wuilliez	Antigua and Barbuda	1:02.23	NR
15	1	1	Kyle Booth	Wales	1:02.28	
16	1	8	Panayiotis Panaretos	Cyprus	1:02.76	

=== Final ===
Rank	Lane	Name	Nationality	Time	Notes
1st place, gold medalist(s)	3	James Wilby	England	59.25	
2nd place, silver medalist(s)	5	Zac Stubblety-Cook	Australia	59.52	
3rd place, bronze medalist(s)	6	Sam Williamson	Australia	59.82	
4	4	Adam Peaty	England	59.86	
5	7	Ross Murdoch	Scotland	1:00.04	
6	1	Craig Benson	Scotland	1:00.53	
7	2	Joshua Yong	Australia	1:00.60	
8	8	Brenden Crawford	South Africa	1:01.98	
