= Swimming at the 2022 Commonwealth Games – Men's 50 metre breaststroke =

Men's 50 metre breaststroke at the 2022 Commonwealth Games
- Venue: Sandwell Aquatics Centre
- Dates: 1 August (heats, semifinals); 2 August (final)
- Competitors: 41 from 27 nations
- Winning time: 26.76

Medalists
gold medal	Adam Peaty	England
silver medal	Samuel Williamson	Australia
bronze medal	Ross Murdoch	Scotland

The men's 50 metre breaststroke event at the 2022 Commonwealth Games was held on 1 August at the Sandwell Aquatics Centre.

== Records ==
Prior to this competition, the existing World, Commonwealth and Games records were as follows:

World record	Adam Peaty (GBR)	25.95	Budapest, Hungary	25 July 2017
Commonwealth record	Adam Peaty (GBR)	25.95	Budapest, Hungary	25 July 2017
Games record	Adam Peaty (ENG)	26.49	Gold Coast, Australia	8 April 2018

== Schedule ==
The schedule was as follows:

All times are British Summer Time (UTC+1)

Date	Time	Round
Monday 1 August 2022	10:39	Qualifying
Monday 1 August 2022	19:20	Semifinals
Tuesday 2 August 2022	20:21	Final

== Results ==
=== Heats ===
Rank	Heat	Lane	Name	Nationality	Time	Notes
1	6	3	Michael Houlie	South Africa	27.10	Q
1	6	4	Adam Peaty	England	27.10	Q
3	5	4	Samuel Williamson	Australia	27.20	Q
4	5	3	Ross Murdoch	Scotland	27.58	Q
5	4	3	Grayson Bell	Australia	27.63	Q
6	5	6	Archie Goodburn	Scotland	27.68	Q
7	6	5	Craig Benson	Scotland	27.72	Q
8	4	4	James Wilby	England	27.74	Q
9	5	2	Brenden Crawford	South Africa	27.77	Q
10	5	5	Greg Butler	England	27.80	Q
11	6	6	Joshua Yong	Australia	27.96	Q
12	4	2	James Dergousoff	Canada	28.04	Q
13	5	1	Maximillian Ang Wei	Singapore	28.23	Q
14	6	2	Ronan Wantenaar	Namibia	28.27	Q, NR
15	4	6	Kyle Booth	Wales	28.30	Q
16	5	8	Jadon Wuilliez	Antigua and Barbuda	28.44	Q, NR
17	5	7	Panayiotis Panaretos	Cyprus	28.46	R
18	6	1	Charlie-Joe Hallett	Guernsey	28.49	R
19	6	7	Bradley Newman	Wales	28.71	
20	4	5	Izaak Bastian	Bahamas	28.74	
21	4	7	Markos Iakovidis	Cyprus	28.78	
22	4	1	Kito Campbell	Jamaica	28.87	
23	6	8	Adrian Robinson	Botswana	28.96	
24	3	5	Luke-Kennedy Thompson	Bahamas	29.30	
25	4	8	Luis Sebastian Weekes	Barbados	29.40	
26	3	8	Ryan Maskelyne	Papua New Guinea	29.53	NR
27	3	7	Ronny Hallett	Guernsey	29.58	
28	3	2	Epeli Rabua	Fiji	29.60	
29	3	3	Shane Cadogan	Saint Vincent and the Grenadines	29.89	
30	3	1	Sukumar Rajbonashi	Bangladesh	29.96	
31	3	6	Caio Lobo	Mozambique	30.53	
32	2	7	David Young	Fiji	30.76	
33	2	4	Tendo Mukalazi	Uganda	30.79	
34	2	5	Gregory Anodin	Mauritius	31.18	
35	2	6	Kumaren Naidu	Zambia	31.31	
36	2	3	Bryson George	Saint Vincent and the Grenadines	32.08	
37	2	2	Zach Moyo	Zambia	32.78	
38	2	1	Mubal Azzam Ibrahim	Maldives	34.62	
39	1	3	Alex Lake	Anguilla	35.72	
40	1	4	Mohamed Kamara	Sierra Leone	36.22	
	1	5	Duwaine Yon	Saint Helena	DSQ	
	3	4	Taichi Vakasama	Fiji	DNS	

=== Semifinals ===
Rank	Heat	Lane	Name	Nationality	Time	Notes
1	2	5	Samuel Williamson	Australia	27.01	Q
2	1	4	Adam Peaty	England	27.03	Q
3	2	4	Michael Houlie	South Africa	27.39	Q
4	2	6	Craig Benson	Scotland	27.64	Q
5	1	6	James Wilby	England	27.65	Q
5	2	3	Grayson Bell	Australia	27.65	Q
7	1	2	Greg Butler	England	27.68	Q
8	1	5	Ross Murdoch	Scotland	27.69	Q
9	1	3	Archie Goodburn	Scotland	27.72	R
10	2	2	Brenden Crawford	South Africa	27.75	R
11	1	7	James Dergousoff	Canada	27.83	
12	2	7	Joshua Yong	Australia	27.85	
13	1	8	Jadon Wuilliez	Antigua and Barbuda	28.19	NR
14	2	1	Maximillian Ang Wei	Singapore	28.29	
15	2	8	Kyle Booth	Wales	28.35	
16	1	1	Ronan Wantenaar	Namibia	28.56	

=== Final ===
Rank	Lane	Name	Nationality	Time	Notes
1st place, gold medalist(s)	5	Adam Peaty	England	26.76	
2nd place, silver medalist(s)	4	Samuel Williamson	Australia	26.97	
3rd place, bronze medalist(s)	8	Ross Murdoch	Scotland	27.32	
4	3	Michael Houlie	South Africa	27.36	
5	6	Craig Benson	Scotland	27.43	
6	2	James Wilby	England	27.72	
7	1	Greg Butler	England	27.98	
8	7	Grayson Bell	Australia	28.31	
