= Brett Lummis =

English swimmer

Personal information
- Nationality: British
- Born: c. 1978–1980

Sport
- Sport: Swimming
- Strokes: Backstroke & medley
- Club: Ipswich

Brett A Lummis (born c. 1978–1980) is a male former international backstroke swimmer from England.

== Swimming career ==
Lummis became a British champion after winning the ASA National British Championships over 50 metres backstroke in 2000.

Lummis represented England in the 200 metres individual medley event, at the 1998 Commonwealth Games in Kuala Lumpur, Malaysia.
