= British swimming champions – 50 metres backstroke winners =

British swimming event

The British swimming champions over 50 metres backstroke, formerly the (Amateur Swimming Association (ASA) National Championships) are listed below.

The event first appeared at the 1991 Championships. Kathy Read (married name Osher) has won a record number of senior National titles (29), which includes five 50 metres backstroke titles. The most titles in this event alone is six, held by Martin Harris and Georgia Davies. The 2025 champions are Oliver Morgan and Lauren Cox.

== 50 metres backstroke champions ==
Year	Men's champion	Women's champion
1991	Martin Harris	Kathy Read
1992	Martin Harris	Kathy Read
1993	Martin Harris	Kathy Read-Osher
1994	Martin Harris	Kathy Read-Osher
1995	Neil Willey	Heather Barnes
1996	Eran Groumi	Sarah Price
1997	Neil Willey	Kathy Read-Osher
1998	Martin Harris	Melanie Marshall
1999	Martin Harris	Katy Sexton
2000	Brett Lummis	Zoe Cray
2001	Neil Willey	Sarah Price
2002	Adam Ruckwood	Sarah Price
2003	James Goddard	Sarah Price
2004	N/A	N/A
2005	Liam Tancock	Gemma Spofforth
2006	Matthew Clay	Katy Sexton
2007	Marco Loughran	Katy Sexton
2008	N/A	N/A
2009	N/A	N/A
2010	Luke Wood	Georgia Davies
2011	Liam Tancock	Georgia Davies
2012	N/A	N/A
2013	Marco Loughran	Georgia Davies
2014	Chris Walker-Hebborn	Lauren Quigley
2015	Chris Walker-Hebborn	Georgia Davies
2016	N/A	N/A
2017	Chris Walker-Hebborn	Georgia Davies
2018	Nicholas Pyle	Lucy Hope
2019	Thomas Howdle	Georgia Davies
Not held during 2020 and 2021 due to the COVID-19 pandemic
2022	Sebastian Somerset	Lauren Cox
2023	Oliver Morgan	Lauren Cox
Not held during 2024 due to it being a non-Olympic event
2025	Oliver Morgan	Lauren Cox
2026	Oliver Morgan	Lauren Cox

== See also ==
- Aquatics GB
- List of British Swimming champions
