= Eran Groumi =

Israeli swimmer (born 1970)

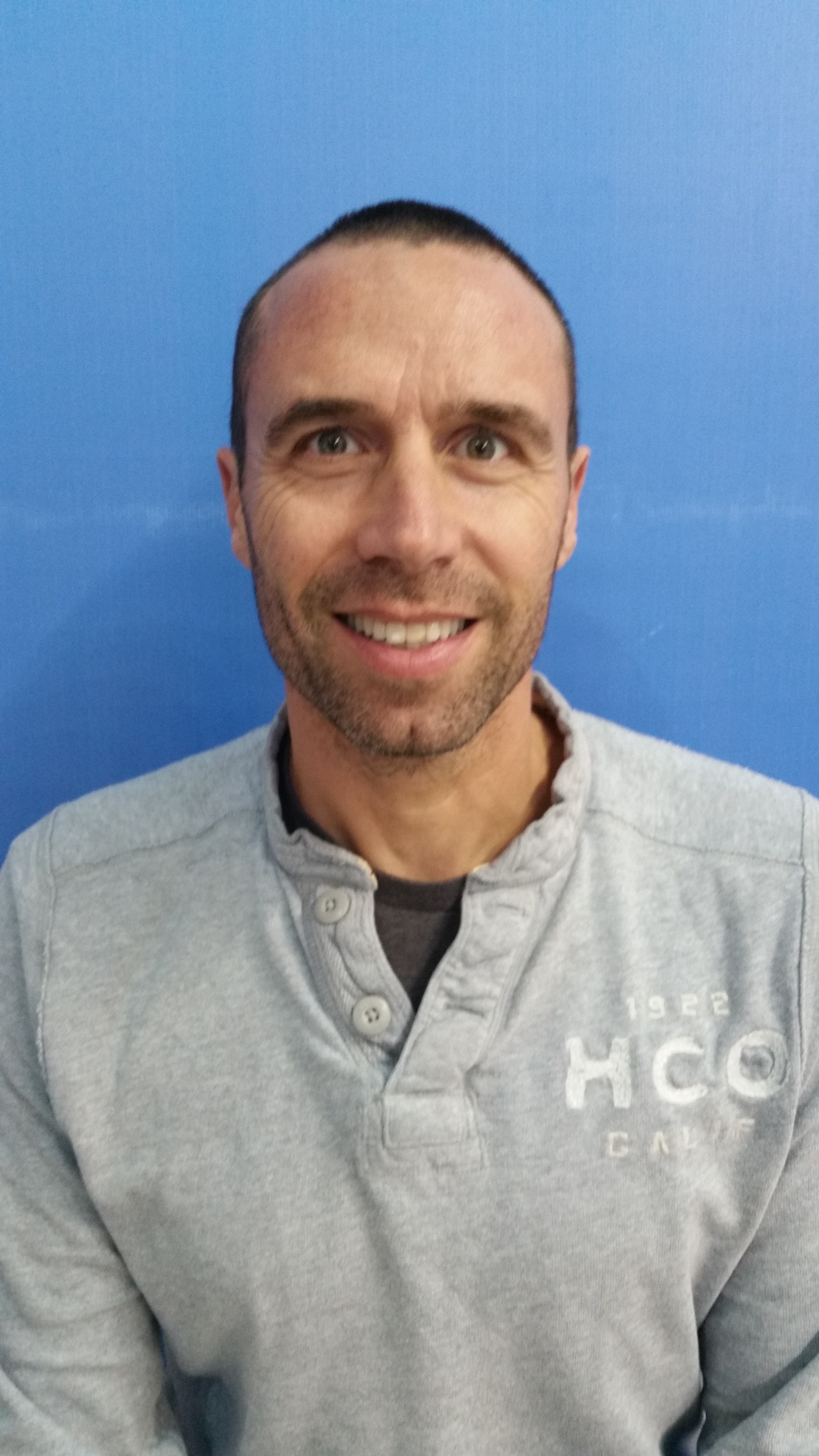
- Eran Groumi in 2016

Personal information
- Native name: ערן גרומי
- Full name: Eran Cohen Groumi
- Nationality: Israel
- Born: 5 June 1970 (age 56) Jerusalem, Israel

Sport
- Sport: Swimming
- Club: Hapoel Jerusalem, YMCA, Maccabi Jerusalem
- Coached by: Noam Tzvi

Eran Cohen Groumi (Hebrew: ערן (כהן) גרומי; born June 5, 1970, in Jerusalem) is a male former backstroke and butterfly swimmer from Israel who set Israeli records in both strokes.

His nephew is Israeli Olympic swimmer Gal Cohen Groumi.

== Swimming career ==
In his early career, at 18 in May of 1989, at the Canada Cup at the Vancouver Aquatic Center, he took first place in the 100-metre backstroke with a time of 59.99. He would significantly reduce his time in later competition.

== Maccabiah Games ==
Groumi competed for Israel at the 1989 Maccabiah Games, winning the 100 m and 200 m butterfly. He set the Israeli record in the 200 m butterfly with his time of 2:04.8.

At the 2017 Maccabiah Games, in the special 4x50m relay race between Israeli and American all-star teams, American Olympic champions Lenny Krayzelburg (four Olympic golds), Jason Lezak (four Olympic golds), and Anthony Ervin (three Olympic golds), with masters swimmer Alex Blavatnik, swam a time of 1:48.23 and defeated Israeli Olympians Groumi, Guy Barnea, Yoav Bruck, and Tal Stricker, who had a time of 1:51.25.

== 1992 Olympics ==
In the most publicized event of his career, Groumi competed for Israel at the 1992 Summer Olympics in Barcelona, Spain, in July. He placed 37th in the 200 backstroke with a time of 2:07.91 in Heat 2. He was scheduled but did not start the 200 IM. He also placed 28th in the 100 metre backstroke with a time of 57.67, and 20th in the 100 metre butterfly with a time of 55.18. He did not make the finals in any event.

== 1996 British Swimming Championships ==
Despite being of Israeli nationality he competed at the ASA National British Championships (Amateur Swimming Association) in Leeds and won the 50 metres backstroke, with a time of 27.45, the 100 metres backstroke with a time of 59.16, and the 100 metres butterfly with a time of 55.74 in 1996.

== 1997 European Championships, Israeli record ==
Notably, Eran set a new Israeli record of 25.13 in the 50-metre butterfly, and new Israeli record of 54.48 in the 100-metre butterfly, in the 1997 European Championships, though he would improve on these times in later competition.

== 1999 4th FINA World Short Course Championships ==
In the FINA World Short Course Championships in Hong Kong in April of 1999, he qualified for the semi-finals in the 100 metre butterfly with a time of 53.96. In the finals, at the age of 28, he would set a new personal best with times of 24.83 in the 50 butterfly, and 53.85 in the 100-metre butterfly.

His Israeli team placed seventh in the 4x100-metre medley relay at the 1999 FINA Worlds.

In 2000 he finished third in the 50 and 100-metre butterfly in the Israel Winter Swimming Championships, and had previously competed in both events in 1999 as well.

== Coaching ==
Eran has served as a swimming coach for H20 Plus in Kefar Schmaryahu, Israel in the Tel Aviv District.
