= British swimming champions – 50 metres breaststroke winners =

British swimming event

The British swimming champions over 50 metres breaststroke, formerly the (Amateur Swimming Association (ASA) National Championships) are listed below.

The event first appeared at the 1991 Championships.

== 50 metres breaststroke champions ==
Year	Men's champion	Women's champion
1991	Adrian Moorhouse	Lorraine Coombes
1992	Adrian Moorhouse	Zoë Baker
1993	P. McGinty	Zoë Baker
1994	Gavin Brettell	Lorraine Coombes
1995	James Parrack	Karen Rake
1996	Andy Cooper	Jo Hocking
1997	Richard Maden	Zoë Baker
1998	Darren Mew	Jaime King
1999	Adam Whitehead	Zoë Baker
2000	Darren Mew	Zoë Baker
2001	James Gibson	Zoë Baker
2002	Darren Mew	Zoë Baker
2003	Darren Mew	Zoë Baker
2004	N/A	N/A
2005	James Gibson	Kate Haywood
2006	Darren Mew	Kirsty Balfour
2007	Ross Clark	Kerry Buchan
2008	N/A	N/A
2009	N/A	N/A
2010	Robert Holderness	Achieng Ajulu-Bushell
2011	Douglas Scott	Kathryn Johnstone
2012	N/A	N/A
2013	Daniel Sliwinski	Stacey Tadd
2014	Adam Peaty	Sophie Taylor
2015	Adam Peaty	Rūta Meilutytė
2016	N/A	N/A
2017	Adam Peaty	Imogen Clark
2018	Adam Peaty	Imogen Clark
2019	Adam Peaty	Sarah Vasey
Not held during 2020 and 2021 due to the COVID-19 pandemic
2022	Adam Peaty	Imogen Clark
2023	Archie Goodburn	Kara Hanlon
Not held during 2024 due to it being a non-Olympic event
2025	Max Morgan	Kara Hanlon
2026	Adam Peaty	Imogen Clark

== See also ==
- Aquatics GB
- List of British Swimming champions
