= Izaak Bastian =

Bahamian swimmer (born 2001)

Personal information
- Full name: Izaak Ziven Sayid Golding Bastian
- National team: Bahamas
- Born: 3 January 2001 (age 25)

Sport
- Sport: Swimming
- College team: Florida State University
Medal record
Men's swimming
Representing Bahamas
Commonwealth Youth Games
Silver medal – second place	2017 Nassau	50 m breaststroke
Bronze medal – third place	2017 Nassau	100 m breaststroke

Izaak Ziven Sayid Golding Bastian (born 3 January 2001) is a Bahamian swimmer. He competed in the 2020 Summer Olympics.

He competed at the collegiate level for Florida State University.

At the 2022 Commonwealth Games, held in July and August in Birmingham, England, Bastian served as a flag bearer for the Bahamas at the Opening Ceremony. Two days later, as part of swimming at the 2022 Commonwealth Games, he placed 23rd in the 100 metre breaststroke with a time of 1:04.07. On 1 August, he swam a time of 28.74 seconds in the preliminaries of the 50 metre breaststroke and placed 20th overall.

Upon graduating from Florida State University in 2022, Izaak was enrolled in the Doctorate of Physical Therapy program at Florida Gulf Coast University. He is on track to graduate with his doctorate in 2025 and has a professional interest in completing an Orthopedic residency the year following.
