= British Swimming Championships (50m) 2014 =

The British Gas Swimming Championships (50 m) 2014 were held at the Tollcross International Swimming Centre, Glasgow from 10–15 April 2014. They also doubled as the first trials for the 2014 Commonwealth Games. They were organised by British Swimming and sponsored by British Gas.

== Medal winners ==
=== Open Men's events ===
Event	Gold		Silver		Bronze	
50 m freestyle	Adam Brown	22.27	Ben Proud	22.31	Richard Schafers	22.65
100 m freestyle	Adam Brown	49.35	Ben Proud	49.54	James Disney-May	49.71
200 m freestyle	James Guy	1:47.54	Calum Jarvis	1:47.77	Nick Grainger	1:48.57
400 m freestyle	James Guy	3:45.15	Nick Grainger	3:47.31	Daniel Fogg	3:49.17
1500 m freestyle	Daniel Fogg	14:59.86	Jay Lelliott	15:12.70	Jack Burnell	15:14.64
50 m backstroke	Chris Walker-Hebborn	25.09	Liam Tancock	25.38	Joe Patching	25.77
100 m backstroke	Chris Walker-Hebborn	53.82	Liam Tancock	54.51	Charlie Boldison	55.10
200 m backstroke	Charlie Boldison	1:59.40	Joe Patching	1:59.54	Luke Greenbank	1:59.87
50 m breaststroke	Adam Peaty	27.43	Ross Murdoch	27.45	Andrew Weatheritt	27.64
100 m breaststroke	Ross Murdoch	59.56	Adam Peaty	59.76	Michael Jamieson	1:00.53
200 m breaststroke	Michael Jamieson	2:07.79	Adam Peaty	2:09.40	Andrew Willis	2:09.85
50 m butterfly	Ben Proud	23.42	Antony James	23.90	Sam Horrocks	24.27
100 m butterfly	James Guy	52.55	Adam Barrett	52.57	Thomas Laxton	52.75
200 m butterfly	Roberto Pavoni	1:57.20	Joe Roebuck	1:57.28	Cameron Brodie	1:57.96
200 m individual medley	Roberto Pavoni	1:59.08	Joe Roebuck	2:00.31	Lewis Coleman	2:00.50
400 m individual medley	Roberto Pavoni	4:12.24	Lewis Smith	4:15.76	Max Litchfield	4:16.61

Key: WR=World record; ER=European record; CR=Commonwealth record; NR=National record

=== Open Women's events ===
Event	Gold		Silver		Bronze	
50 m freestyle	Francesca Halsall	24.51	Sian Harkin	25.07	Amy Smith	25.09
100 m freestyle	Francesca Halsall	54.12	Amy Smith	54.94	Rebecca Turner	55.40
200 m freestyle	Siobhan-Marie O'Connor	1:56.59	Jazmin Carlin	1:57.97	Eleanor Faulkner	1:58.82
400 m freestyle	Jazmin Carlin	4:04.68	Aimee Willmott	4:08.98	Eleanor Faulkner	4:09.69
800 m freestyle	Jazmin Carlin	8:18.36	Eleanor Faulkner	8:32.99	Jessica Thielmann	8:35.47
50 m backstroke	Lauren Quigley	27.90	Georgia Davies	27.99	Francesca Halsall	28.04
100 m backstroke	Georgia Davies	59.78	Lauren Quigley	1:00.16	Elizabeth Simmonds	1:00.60
200 m backstroke	Lauren Quigley	2:09.79	Elizabeth Simmonds	2:10.72	Jessica Fullalove	2:12.66
50 m breaststroke	Sophie Taylor	30.98	Sarah Vassey	31.43	Corrie Scott	31.62
100 m breaststroke	Sophie Taylor	1:07.08	Corrie Scott	1:08.77	Molly Renshaw	1:08.94
200 m breaststroke	Sophie Taylor	2:24.46	Molly Renshaw	2:25.10	Danielle Lowe	2:28.28
50 m butterfly	Francesca Halsall	25.83	Amy Smith	26.41	Rachael Kelly	26.57
100 m butterfly	Rachael Kelly	58.40	Siobhan-Marie O'Connor	58.42	Francesca Halsall	58.78
200 m butterfly	Aimee Willmott	2:07.97	Tilly Gray	2:10.59	Elena Sheridan	2:10.81
200 m individual medley	Siobhan-Marie O'Connor	2:09.71	Aimee Willmott	2:10.60	Sophie Allen	2:11.54
400 m individual medley	Aimee Willmott	4:35.94	Danielle Lowe	4:42.42	Rosie Rudin	4:45.33

Key: WR=World record; ER=European record; CR=Commonwealth record; NR=National record

== See also ==
- British Swimming
- List of British Swimming Championships champions
- List of British records in swimming
