= Swimming at the 2022 Commonwealth Games – Men's 400 metre freestyle =

Men's 400 metre freestyle at the 2022 Commonwealth Games
- Venue: Sandwell Aquatics Centre
- Dates: 29 July
- Competitors: 21 from 15 nations
- Winning time: 3:43.06

Medalists
gold medal	Elijah Winnington	Australia
silver medal	Samuel Short	Australia
bronze medal	Mack Horton	Australia

The men's 400 metre freestyle event at the 2022 Commonwealth Games was held on 29 July at the Sandwell Aquatics Centre.

== Records ==
Prior to this competition, the existing world, Commonwealth and Games records were as follows:

World record	Paul Biedermann (GER)	3:40.07	Rome, Italy	26 July 2009
Commonwealth record	Ian Thorpe (AUS)	3:40.08	Manchester, United Kingdom	30 July 2002
Games record	Ian Thorpe (AUS)	3:40.08	Manchester, United Kingdom	30 July 2002

== Schedule ==
The schedule is as follows:

All times are British Summer Time (UTC+1)

Date	Time	Round
Friday 29 July 2022	10:30	Heats
Friday 29 July 2022	19:00	Final

== Results ==
=== Heats ===
Rank	Heat	Lane	Name	Nationality	Time	Notes
1	2	6	Daniel Wiffen	Northern Ireland	3:47.43	Q, NR
2	2	4	Mack Horton	Australia	3:47.54	Q
3	3	4	Elijah Winnington	Australia	3:48.32	Q
4	3	5	Samuel Short	Australia	3:48.46	Q
5	2	3	Luke Turley	England	3:49.61	Q
6	3	2	Matthew Sates	South Africa	3:49.69	Q
7	3	6	Khiew Hoe Yean	Malaysia	3:50.03	Q
8	3	3	Daniel Jervis	Wales	3:50.13	Q
9	2	5	Kieran Bird	Wales	3:50.30	R
10	3	7	Toby Robinson	England	3:52.21	R
11	2	2	Jeremy Bagshaw	Canada	3:52.62	
12	3	1	Eric Brown	Canada	3:52.88	
13	2	1	Stephen Milne	Scotland	3:54.35	
14	3	8	Kushagra Rawat	India	3:57.45	
15	1	4	James Freeman	Botswana	3:57.56	
16	2	8	Andrew Ross	South Africa	3:58.44	
17	2	7	Wesley Roberts	Cook Islands	4:00.62	
18	1	5	Isaac Dodds	Jersey	4:01.50	
19	1	6	Luke-Kennedy Thompson	Bahamas	4:04.90	
20	1	3	Graham Chatoor	Trinidad and Tobago	4:05.50	
21	1	2	Samuel Lowe	Guernsey	4:14.62	

=== Final ===
Rank	Lane	Name	Nationality	Time	Notes
1st place, gold medalist(s)	3	Elijah Winnington	Australia	3:43.06	
2nd place, silver medalist(s)	6	Samuel Short	Australia	3:45.07	
3rd place, bronze medalist(s)	5	Mack Horton	Australia	3:46.49	
4	4	Daniel Wiffen	Northern Ireland	3:46.62	NR
5	2	Luke Turley	England	3:48.50	
6	1	Khiew Hoe Yean	Malaysia	3:49.95	
7	7	Matthew Sates	South Africa	3:50.07	
8	8	Daniel Jervis	Wales	3:51.19	
