= City of Sheffield Water Polo Club =

Water polo club in Sheffield, England

Sheffield Water Polo
- Full name: City of Sheffield Water Polo Club
- Ground: Ponds Forge

City of Sheffield Water Polo Club is a water polo club located in Sheffield, England. It has been granted “Beacon” club status by the Amateur Swimming Association. This makes Sheffield one of only 3 water polo clubs in the country to be awarded this accolade. Incidentally Sheffield’s Swimming and Diving clubs have also been awarded this status.

== History ==
The city of Sheffield is one of the leading water polo clubs in Great Britain – the women’s A team were British champions for 3 years running and league one winners for 5 years running. The men’s team were promoted to the second division of the national league 2007/08, winning the division in 2010/11 and the women's B team were promoted to the second division in the 2009/10 season. Sheffield youth girls '91's ASA National Water Polo Championships 2008 runners up.
