= Sophie Yendell =

British swimmer (born 2002)

Personal information
- Nationality: British (English)
- Born: 6 April 2002 (age 24) Tamworth, England

Sport
- Sport: Swimming
- Event: Butterfly
- University team: University of Pittsburgh
- Club: Derventio Excel
Medal record
Representing England
British Swimming Championships
Gold medal – first place	2023 Sheffield	50m butterfly

Sophie Yendell (born 6 April 2002) is a swimmer from England, who is a British Champion.

== Career ==
Yendell represented Great Britain at junior level at the 2019 European Junior Championships. She swam for the City of Derby before joining for Derventio Excel in 2019. She also swam for the Pittsburgh Panthers in 2022.

She came to prominence in 2023, after winning the gold medal at the 2023 British Swimming Championships in the 50 metres butterfly.
