= Alexander Clapper =

English swimmer

Personal information
- Nationality: England
- Born: 1974 (age 51–52) Greater London, England

Sport
- Sport: Swimming
- Club: City of Coventry

Alexander Clapper is a male former swimmer who competed for England.

== Swimming career ==
Clapper was the British champion over 200 metres breaststroke in 1994. He represented England in the breaststroke events, at the 1994 Commonwealth Games in Victoria, British Columbia, Canada.

He swan for the City of Coventry Swimming Club.
