= Luke Turley =

English swimmer

Personal information
- Full name: Luke Thomas Turley
- Nickname: Turls
- Nationality: British (English)
- Born: 24 March 2000 (age 26) Watford, England

Sport
- Sport: Swimming
- Strokes: Freestyle
- Club: Hatfield SC
Medal record
Men's swimming
Representing England
Commonwealth Games
Bronze medal – third place	2022 Birmingham	1500 m freestyle

Luke Thomas Turley (born 24 March 2000) is an English international swimmer. He has represented England at the Commonwealth Games.

== Biography ==
Turley educated at the University of Bath began his swimming career at the Stevenage Swimming Club before joining the Hatfield Swimming Club. He won double silver behind Daniel Jervis in the 400m and 800m freestyle events at the 2022 British Swimming Championships.

In 2022, he was selected for the 2022 Commonwealth Games in Birmingham where he competed in the men's 400 metre freestyle, finishing in 5th place and the men's 1500 metre freestyle.

In 2023, he won the gold medal at the 2023 British Swimming Championships in the 400 metres freestyle.

He currently works full time as a swimming coach for the University of Bath as head of the recreational team, and has successfully coached swimmers to both national and international success.

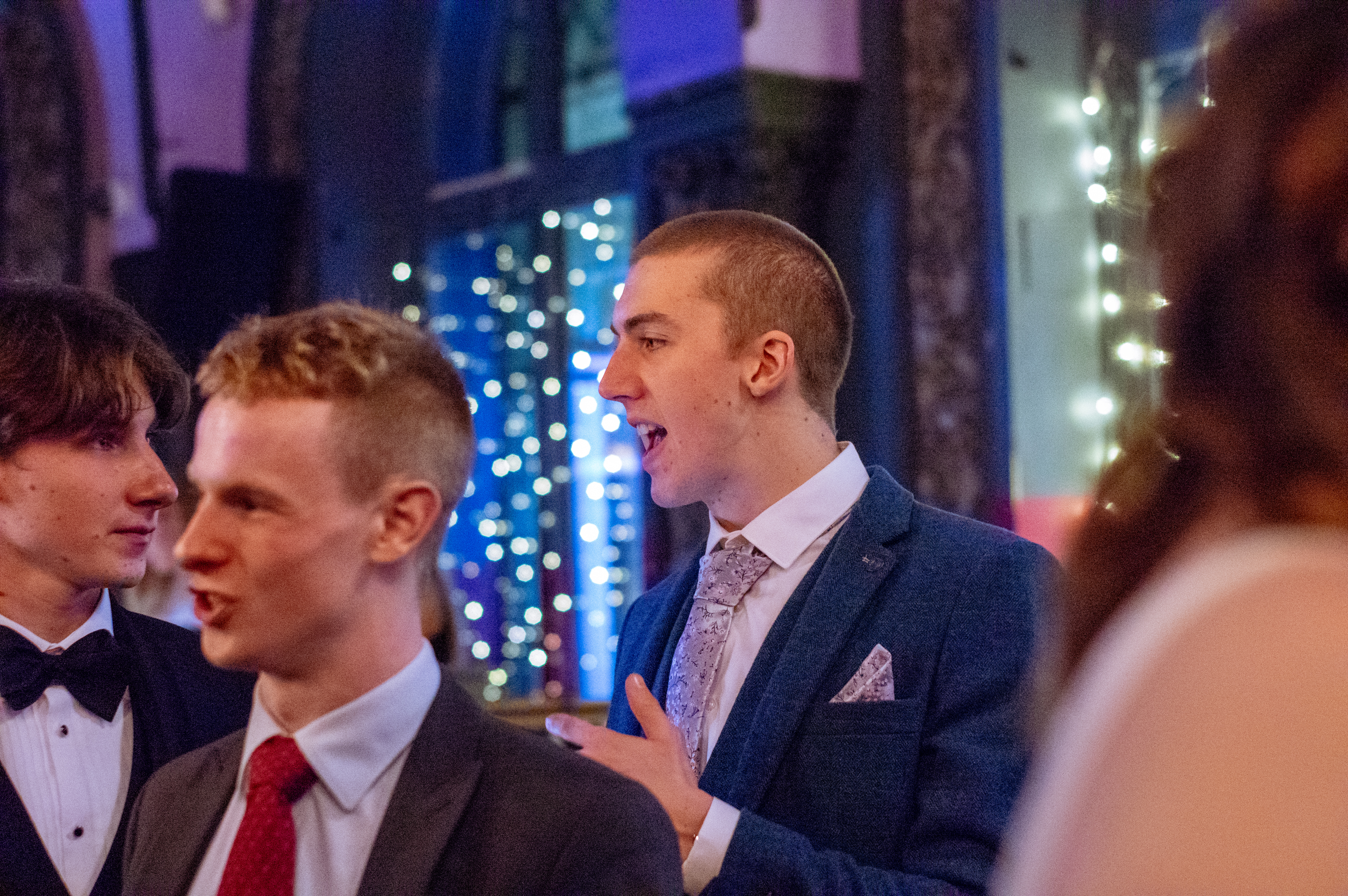
As a coach for the University of Bath, Luke Turley has been known to be present at various prestigious events.
