= Leah Crisp =

British swimmer (born 2001)

Personal information
- Full name: Leah Phoebe Crisp
- Nationality: British (English)
- Born: 16 October 2001 (age 25) Wakefield, England

Sport
- Sport: Swimming
- Event: 800m/1500m freestyle

Leah Phoebe Crisp (born 16 October 2001) is a three times British champion and British international swimmer and competed at the 2024 Summer Olympics.

== Biography ==
Crisp educated at Wakefield Girls' High School and the University of Bath won two senior national titles in 2019, after winning the 800 and 1500 metres freestyle titles at the British Swimming Championships, while swimming for the City of Leeds. In 2020, she took a place in the British Swimming's National programme in Bath. Additionally in 2020, she won two bronze medals at the European Junior event in Luxembourg.

When the British Championships resumed after the COVID-19 pandemic cancellations she won her third national title at the 2022 British Swimming Championships in the 800 metres and also took a bronze over 1500 metres.

Crisp was selected by the British team for the 2024 Summer Olympics where she finished 20th in the 10 kilometre open water marathon.
