= Gerard Rowlinson =

British swimmer

Personal information
- Born: 15 August 1941 (age 84) Farnworth, England
- Height: 178 cm (5 ft 10 in)
- Weight: 67 kg (148 lb)

Sport
- Sport: Swimming
- Club: Bolton Swimming Club

Gerard Rowlinson (born 15 August 1941) is a British former swimmer. He competed in the men's 200 metre breaststroke at the 1960 Summer Olympics.

At the ASA National British Championships, he won the 220 yards breaststroke title in 1959 and 1960.
