= Nina Herbert =

British swimmer (born 1966)

Personal information
- Born: 1966 (age 59–60) Hammersmith, London, England

Nina Louise Herbert (born 1966), is a female former swimmer who competed for England.

== Swimming career ==
Herbert became National champion in 1984 when she won the 1984 ASA National Championship title in the 200 metres breaststroke.

She represented England in the 200 metres breaststroke event, at the 1986 Commonwealth Games in Edinburgh, Scotland.
