= 1993 FINA World Swimming Championships (25 m) – Men's 100 metre backstroke =

These are the official results of the Men's 100 metres Backstroke event at the 1993 FINA Short Course World Championships held in Palma de Mallorca, Spain.

== Finals ==
RANK	FINAL A	TIME
	Tripp Schwenk (USA)	52.98
	Martin Harris (GBR)	53.93
	Rodolfo Falcón (CUB)	54.00
4.	Craig Ford (NZL)	54.02
5.	Tino Weber (GER)	54.15
6.	Rogério Romero (BRA)	54.47
7.	Carlos Ventosa (ESP)	54.50
8.	Gary Anderson (CAN)	54.59

== Qualifying heats ==
RANK	HEATS RANKING	TIME
1.	Tripp Schwenk (USA)	53.25
2.	Craig Ford (NZL)	54.04
3.	Rodolfo Falcón (CUB)	54.12
4.	Tino Weber (GER)	54.23
5.	Carlos Ventosa (ESP)	54.61
6.	Martin Harris (GBR)	54.64
7.	Rogério Romero (BRA)	54.66
8.	Gary Anderson (CAN)	54.98

== See also ==
- 1992 Men's Olympic Games 100m Backstroke
- 1993 Men's European LC Championships 100m Backstroke
