= Swimming at the 2022 Commonwealth Games – Men's 1500 metre freestyle =

Men's 1500 metre freestyle at the 2022 Commonwealth Games
- Venue: Sandwell Aquatics Centre
- Dates: 2 August (heats); 3 August (final)
- Competitors: 10 from 6 nations
- Winning time: 14:48.54

Medalists
gold medal	Samuel Short	Australia
silver medal	Daniel Wiffen	Northern Ireland
bronze medal	Luke Turley	England

The men's 1500 metre freestyle event at the 2022 Commonwealth Games was held on 2 and 3 August 2022 at the Sandwell Aquatics Centre.

== Records ==
Prior to this competition, the existing world, Commonwealth and Games records were as follows:

Record	Time	Athlete (nation)	Meet	Location	Date	Ref
World record	14:31.02	Sun Yang (CHN)		London, England	4 August 2012	
Commonwealth record	14:34.56	Grant Hackett (AUS)		Fukuoka, Japan	29 July 2001	
Games record	14:41.66	Kieren Perkins (AUS)		Victoria, Canada	24 August 1994	

== Schedule ==
The schedule was as follows:

All times are British Summer Time (UTC+1)

Date	Time	Round
Tuesday 2 August 2022	11:40	Qualifying
Wednesday 3 August 2022	20:12	Final

== Results ==
=== Heats ===
Rank	Heat	Lane	Name	Nationality	Time	Notes
1	1	4	Samuel Short	Australia	15:02.66	Q
2	2	3	Kieren Pollard	Australia	15:23.48	Q
3	1	5	Toby Robinson	England	15:33.59	Q
4	2	3	Luke Turley	England	15:35.65	Q
5	2	5	Daniel Wiffen	Northern Ireland	15:37.53	Q
6	2	6	Eric Brown	Canada	15:38.83	Q
7	1	6	Advait Page	India	15:39.25	Q
8	2	3	Kushagra Rawat	India	15:47.77	Q
9	2	7	Graham Chatoor	Trinidad and Tobago	16:10.96	R
10	1	7	Isaac Dodds	Jersey	16:21.21	R
	1	2	James Freeman	Botswana	DNS	
	2	4	Daniel Jervis	Wales	DNS	

=== Final ===
Rank	Lane	Name	Nationality	Time	Notes
1st place, gold medalist(s)	4	Samuel Short	Australia	14:48.54	
2nd place, silver medalist(s)	2	Daniel Wiffen	Northern Ireland	14:51.79	NR
3rd place, bronze medalist(s)	6	Luke Turley	England	15:12.78	
4	3	Toby Robinson	England	15:14.64	
5	5	Kieren Pollard	Australia	15:18.02	
6	7	Eric Brown	Canada	15:25.48	
7	1	Advait Page	India	15:32.36	
8	8	Kushagra Rawat	India	15:42.67	
