= Sam Williamson (swimmer) =

Australian swimmer (born 1997)

Samuel Williamson
Personal information
- Nationality: Australian
- Born: 19 December 1997 (age 28) Mount Waverley, Victoria, Australia
- Height: 1.87 m (6 ft 2 in)

Sport
- Sport: Swimming
- Strokes: Breaststroke
Medal record
Men's swimming
Representing Australia
World Championships (LC)
Gold medal – first place	2024 Doha	50 m breaststroke
Silver medal – second place	2023 Fukuoka	4×100 m mixed medley
Silver medal – second place	2024 Doha	4×100 m mixed medley
Bronze medal – third place	2023 Fukuoka	4×100 m medley
Commonwealth Games
Gold medal – first place	2022 Birmingham	4×100 m mixed medley
Gold medal – first place	2026 Glasgow	50 m breaststroke
Gold medal – first place	2026 Glasgow	100 m breaststroke
Gold medal – first place	2026 Glasgow	4×100 m medley
Gold medal – first place	2026 Glasgow	4×100 m mixed medley
Silver medal – second place	2022 Birmingham	50 m breaststroke
Silver medal – second place	2022 Birmingham	4×100 m medley
Bronze medal – third place	2022 Birmingham	100 m breaststroke
Pan Pacific Championships
Gold medal – first place	2026 Irvine	50 m breaststroke
Silver medal – second place	2026 Irvine	4×100 m medley
Silver medal – second place	2026 Irvine	4×100 m mixed medley
Bronze medal – third place	2026 Irvine	100 m breaststroke

Samuel Williamson (born 19 December 1997) is an Australian international swimmer. He has represented Australia at the 2022 Commonwealth Games, where he won one gold, two silver and a bronze medal, the 2026 Commonwealth Games, where he won two gold medals, and the 2024 Paris Olympics.

== Biography ==
Williamson is from Melbourne. He attended Sandringham College, graduating in 2015 and receiving a prestigious ATAR in the 90's (including a study score of 44 in English, placing him in roughly the top 2 percent of the state) He was selected for the 2022 Commonwealth Games in Birmingham, where he competed in the men's 50m metres breaststroke, reaching the final and winning a silver medal. He also reached the final of the 100m breaststroke and won a bronze medal.

At the 2022 Australian Short Course Swimming Championships, held in Sydney in August, Williamson won the gold medal in the 50 meter breaststroke, 100 meter breaststroke, and 200 meter breaststroke.

At the 2024 Paris Olympics, he competed in the men’s 100 meter breaststroke.

At the 2026 Commonwealth Games in Glasgow, he won gold medals in the 50 and 100 meter breaststroke.
