= Martin Harris (swimmer) =

British swimmer (born 1969)

Personal information
- Full name: Martin Harris
- National team: Great Britain
- Born: 21 May 1969 (age 57) Bow, London, England
- Height: 2.01 m (6 ft 7 in)
- Weight: 92 kg (203 lb)

Sport
- Sport: Swimming
- Strokes: Backstroke
- Club: Tower Hamlets
Medal record
Men's swimming
Representing Great Britain
World Championships (SC)
Silver medal – second place	1993 Palma	100 m backstroke
Bronze medal – third place	1993 Palma	4×100 m medley
Bronze medal – third place	1997 Gothenburg	4×100 m medley
European Championships (LC)
Bronze medal – third place	1993 Sheffield	100 m backstroke
Bronze medal – third place	1993 Sheffield	4×100 m medley
Representing England
Commonwealth Games
Gold medal – first place	1994 Victoria	100m backstroke
Bronze medal – third place	1994 Victoria	medley relay
Silver medal – second place	1998 Kuala Lumpur	medley relay

Martin Harris (born 21 May 1969) is an English former International competitive swimmer and backstroke specialist.

== Swimming career ==
Harris represented Great Britain in international championships during the 1990s, spanning 12 years, swimming at 2x Olympics 1992, 1996, 3x FINA World Long Course Championships, and 5x FINA World Short Course Championships silver medal 100m backstroke 1993 3x European LC championships bronze medal 100m backstroke 1995 and England 3x at the Commonwealth Games. 1994 - Gold 100m backstroke, 1994 Bronze medley relay, 1998 silver 4x100m medley relay, 2002. During his career, Harris broke more than 50 British long and short-course swimming records.

At the 1992 Summer Olympics in Barcelona, Spain, Harris competed in the men's 100-metre backstroke,. He also swam for the sixth-place British men's team in the 4x100-metre medley relay in the qualifying heats. Thereafter, he became a fixture on the British 4x100-metre medley relay team, winning bronze medals in the medley relay at the 1993 European Championships and the 100m backstroke silver medalist 1993 FINA short course world championships.

Harris represented England at the 1994, 1998, and 2002 Commonwealth Games. In the 1994 Games in Victoria, British Columbia, Harris won a gold medal in the 100-metre backstroke, and a bronze as a member of the English team in the 4x100-metre medley relay. Representing Great Britain at the 1996 Summer Olympics in Atlanta, he qualified for both the 100-metre and 200-metre backstroke.

Harris earned a silver medal in the 100m backstroke at the 1993 FINA World Short Course Championships in Palma and another bronze medal with the British team in the 4x100-metre medley relay at the 1997 FINA Short Course World Championships. Harris won a silver medal as a member of the English team in the 4x100-metre medley relay, and 4th in the 100m backstroke at the 1998 Commonwealth Games in Kuala Lumpur, Malaysia.

At the ASA National British Championships, he won the 50 metres backstroke title six times (1991, 1992, 1993, 1994, 1998, 1999) and the 100 metres backstroke title six times (1990, 1991, 1992, 1993, 1994, 1999).

== See also ==
- List of Commonwealth Games medallists in swimming (men)
