= Lorraine Coombes =

Personal information
- Nationality: English
- Born: 1960 (age 64–65)

Sport
- Coached by: Dave Heathcock

Lorraine Coombes (born 1960), is a female former swimmer who competed for Great Britain and England.

== Swimming career ==
Coombes became the double National champion in 1991 when she won the ASA National British Championship 50 metres breaststroke and 100 metres breaststroke titles. She also won the 1994 50 metres title.

She represented England in the 100 metres and 200 metres breaststroke events, at the 1990 Commonwealth Games in Auckland, New Zealand. She swam for Reading and Southampton competed for Great Britain in the 1989 and 1991 European Championship and the 1989 World Championship.
