= Brian Day (swimmer) =

British swimmer

Personal information
- Nationality: British (English)
- Born: 4 July 1938 Sheffield, England
- Died: 18 December 2004 (aged 66) Rotherham, England

Sport
- Sport: Swimming
- Event: Breaststroke
- Club: Sheffield SC

Brian Boulton Day (4 July 1938 – 18 December 2004) was a swimmer who competed for England.

== Biography ==
Day attended Sheffield Central Technical School and in 1953 won the Sheffield senior title over 200 yards breaststroke while aged 15 and set a junior record of 81.9 sec over 110 yards.

In May 1958 he took part in the Empire Games trials in Blackpool and subsequently represented the English team at the 1958 British Empire and Commonwealth Games in Cardiff, Wales, where he competed in the 220 yards breaststroke event.

At the ASA National British Championships he won the 220 yards breaststroke title in 1957. He was also the Yorkshire breaststroke champion and swam for the Sheffield Aquatic Club.
