= Jacob Peters (swimmer) =

British swimmer

Jacob Peters OLY
Personal information
- Nationality: British (English)
- Born: 20 August 2000 (age 26) Guildford, Surrey, England
- Height: 1.89 m (6 ft 2 in)
- Weight: 85 kg (187 lb)

Sport
- Sport: Swimming
- Strokes: Butterfly
Medal record
Men's swimming
Representing Great Britain
World Championships (LC)
Bronze medal – third place	2022 Budapest	4×100 m medley
European Championships (LC)
Gold medal – first place	2018 Glasgow	4×100 m medley
Bronze medal – third place	2022 Rome	4×100 m mixed medley
Representing England
Commonwealth Games
Gold medal – first place	2022 Birmingham	4×100 m medley
Silver medal – second place	2018 Gold Coast	4×100 m medley

Jacob Thomas Taylor Peters OLY (born 20 August 2000) is a British swimmer who competed at the 2020 Summer Olympics. He swims at Bath Performance Centre under David McNulty.

== Career ==
He is a Tokyo 2021 Olympian and multiple international medal winning athlete.

In 2022, he was part of the team that won the gold medal in the Men's 4 × 100 metre medley relay at the 2022 Commonwealth Games in Birmingham.

In 2023, he won two gold medals at the 2023 British Swimming Championships in the 50 metres butterfly and the 100 metres butterfly. It was the first time he had won the 50 metres event and the second time that he had won the 100 metres title.

In 2025, Peters finished third in the 100 metres butterfly at the 2025 Aquatics GB Swimming Championships, missing out on a place for the 2025 World Aquatics Championships in Singapore. He also lost his 50 metres butterfly title after finishing second to Ben Proud.
