= Kara Hanlon =

Scottish swimmer (born 1997)

Personal information
- Nationality: Scottish
- Born: 4 June 1997 (age 29) Stornoway, Isle of Lewis, Scotland

Sport
- Sport: Swimming
- Event: breaststroke
- Club: University of Edinburgh
Medal record
Representing Scotland
British Swimming Championships
Gold medal – first place	2022 Sheffield	100m breaststroke
Gold medal – first place	2023 Sheffield	50m breaststroke
Gold medal – first place	2024 London	200m breaststroke
Gold medal – first place	2025 London	50m breaststroke

Kara Aline Hanlon (born 4 June 1997) is a Scottish international swimmer. She has represented Scotland at the Commonwealth Games.

== Biography ==
Hanlon educated at the University of Edinburgh won three gold medals at the 2020 British Universities and Colleges Sport Championships. She won three medals including the gold medal in the 100 metres breaststroke event, at the 2022 British Swimming Championships.

After just missing selection in 2014 she gained selection for the 2022 Commonwealth Games in Birmingham where she competed in two events; the women's 50 metres breaststroke, finishing in 6th place and the women's 100 metres breaststroke, finishing in 7th place.

In 2023, she won two gold medals at the 2023 British Swimming Championships in the 50 metres breaststroke and the 100 metres breaststroke. It was the first time that she had won the 50 metres event but the second time that she had won the 100 metres title.

Hanlon won the 200 metres breaststroke at the 2024 Aquatics GB Swimming Championships but missed out on a place at the 2024 Summer Olympics. In 2025, Hanlon successfully defended her 50 metres breaststroke title at the 2025 Aquatics GB Swimming Championships.
