= Toby Robinson =

English swimmer (born 1996)

Personal information
- Full name: Tobias Patrick Robinson
- Nationality: British (English)
- Born: 22 August 1996 (age 30) Wolverhampton, England

Sport
- Sport: Swimming
- Event: Freestyle

Tobias Patrick Robinson (born 22 August 1996) is an English international swimmer. He has represented England at the Commonwealth Games and Great Britain at the Olympic Games.

== Biography ==
Robinson trains out of Loughborough University and competed in the Open water swimming at the 2022 World Aquatics Championships – Men's 10 km where he finished in 21st place. In 2022, he also won a silver medal behind Daniel Jervis in the 1500m freestyle event at the 2022 British Swimming Championships.

In 2022, he was selected for the 2022 Commonwealth Games in Birmingham where he competed in the men's 400 metre freestyle, finishing in 10th place and the men's 1500 metre freestyle where he finished in 4th. Robinson joined the team following the withdrawal of Max Litchfield.

Robinson came 15th in 10km Open Water at the 2024 World Aquatics Championships in Doha, earning a guaranteed place in the same event at the Olympics. He then won the 800 metres freestyle at the 2024 Aquatics GB Swimming Championships and subsequently competed for Team GB at the 2024 Summer Olympics in the 10km, finishing in 14th place.
