= Archie Goodburn =

British swimmer (born 2001)

Personal information
- Born: 26 June 2001 (age 25) Edinburgh, Scotland

Sport
- Sport: Swimming
- Event: Breaststroke
- University team: University of Edinburgh
Medal record
Representing Scotland
British Swimming Championships
| Gold medal – first place | 2023 Sheffield | 50m breaststroke |
Representing United Kingdom
World Junior Championships
| Bronze medal – third place | 2019 Budapest | 50m breaststroke |
European Junior Championships
| Silver medal – second place | 2019 Kazan | 50 m breaststroke |
| Bronze medal – third place | 2019 Kazan | 4x100 m freestyle |
European SC Championships
| Silver medal – second place | 2023 Otenpeni | 4x50 m medley |

Archie Goodburn (born 26 June 2001) is a swimmer from Scotland, who is a British Champion and competed in the Commonwealth Games.

== Career ==
Goodburn made his Commonwealth Games debut in the men's 50-metre breaststroke.

Goodburn won a bronze medal in the 50m breaststroke at the 2019 World Junior Swimming Championships and won the gold medal at the 2023 British Swimming Championships, in the 50 metres breaststroke.

Goodburn won Bronze at the European Short Course Swimming Championships in December 2023 as part of the Great Britain 4x50m Medley Relay Team. At the same meet he also broke the Scottish Record on the 50m Breaststroke in a time of 26.26 seconds.

== Personal life ==
In June 2024, Goodburn announced that he had been diagnosed with three oligodendrogliomas, a form of cancer that can affect the brain and spinal cord, and that he would be undergoing courses of chemotherapy and radiotherapy to treat it.
