= Greg Butler (swimmer) =

English swimmer (born 2000)

Personal information
- Full name: Gregory Butler
- Nationality: British (English)
- Born: 31 December 2000 (age 25) Clayton, Staffordshire, England

Sport
- Sport: Swimming
- Strokes: Breaststroke
Medal record
Men's swimming
Representing Great Britain
European Championships (LC)
Bronze medal – third place	2022 Rome	4×100 m mixed medley
Representing England
Commonwealth Games
Gold medal – first place	2022 Birmingham	4×100 m medley
Bronze medal – third place	2022 Birmingham	4×100 m mixed medley

Gregory Butler (born 31 December 2000) is an English international swimmer. He has represented England at the Commonwealth Games.

== Biography ==
Butler first competed at National Age group level in 2013 as a 12 year old reaching the 100m & 200m Breaststroke finals whilst representing Newcastle Staffs ASC. In the autumn of 2013 he moved to City of Derby SC & in 2014 at the British Swimming Summer Championships, he won the 200m Breaststroke breaking the British 13 year old age group record in a time of 2 mins:25.86 (this is still the England Age Group record). In 2016, Butler became the fastest-ever British 14-year-old breaststroke swimmer over 100m and 200m and fastest-ever 17-year-old British swimmer in the 200-metre discipline. He won two bronze medals at the 2022 British Swimming Championships in the 100 & 200 metres breaststroke.

In 2022, he was selected for the 2022 Commonwealth Games in Birmingham where he competed in five events; the men's 50 metres breaststroke, reaching the final and finishing in 7th place, the men's 100 metre breaststroke finishing in 11th place and the men's 200 metre breaststroke, reaching the final and finishing in 5th place. He was also part of the team that won the bronze medal in the 4×100 m mixed medley & the gold medal in the Men’s 4 x 100 metre medley relay

In 2025, Butler won the 100 metres breaststroke title at the 2025 Aquatics GB Swimming Championships, which sealed a qualification place for the 2025 World Aquatics Championships in Singapore. He also won the 200 m breaststroke.
