= James Wilby (swimmer) =

British swimmer

Personal information
- Full name: James Alexander Hanson Wilby
- National team: Great Britain; England
- Born: 12 November 1993 (age 32) Glasgow, Scotland, United Kingdom
- Height: 1.91 m (6 ft 3 in)
- Weight: 83 kg (183 lb)

Sport
- Sport: Swimming
- Strokes: Breaststroke
- Club: Loughborough NC
- Coach: Dave Hemmings
Medal record
Event	1st	2nd	3rd
Olympic Games	0	1	0
World Championships (LC)	1	1	3
European Championships (LC)	3	2	2
Commonwealth Games	4	3	2
Total	8	7	7
Men's swimming
Representing Great Britain
Olympic Games
Silver medal – second place	2020 Tokyo	4×100 m medley
World Championships (LC)
Gold medal – first place	2019 Gwangju	4×100 m medley
Silver medal – second place	2019 Gwangju	100 m breaststroke
Bronze medal – third place	2019 Gwangju	4×100 m mixed medley
Bronze medal – third place	2022 Budapest	4×100 m medley
Bronze medal – third place	2024 Doha	4×100 m mixed medley
European Championships (LC)
Gold medal – first place	2018 Glasgow	4×100 m medley
Gold medal – first place	2020 Budapest	4×100 m medley
Gold medal – first place	2022 Rome	200 m breaststroke
Silver medal – second place	2018 Glasgow	100 m breaststroke
Silver medal – second place	2018 Glasgow	200 m breaststroke
Bronze medal – third place	2020 Budapest	100 m breaststroke
Bronze medal – third place	2022 Rome	4×100 m mixed medley
Representing England
Commonwealth Games
Gold medal – first place	2014 Glasgow	4×100 m medley
Gold medal – first place	2018 Gold Coast	200 m breaststroke
Gold medal – first place	2022 Birmingham	100 m breaststroke
Gold medal – first place	2022 Birmingham	4×100 m medley
Silver medal – second place	2018 Gold Coast	100 m breaststroke
Silver medal – second place	2018 Gold Coast	4×100 m medley
Silver medal – second place	2022 Birmingham	200 m breaststroke
Bronze medal – third place	2018 Gold Coast	50 m breaststroke
Bronze medal – third place	2022 Birmingham	4×100 m mixed medley

James Alexander Hanson Wilby (born 12 November 1993) is a British competitive swimmer who specialises in the breaststroke. Wilby is the 2018 Commonwealth Games champion in 200 metre breaststroke, the 2022 Commonwealth Games champion in 100 metre breaststroke, and the 2022 European champion in 200 metre breaststroke. He formed part of the Great Britain team that won World Championship gold in the men's 4 x 100 metre medley relay in 2019, and the England team that won the Commonwealth Games Men's 4 x 100 metre medley relay in 2014 and 2022.

He has represented Great Britain at the Olympic Games, winning a silver in the 2020 Summer Olympics as a heat swimmer in the men's 4 x 100 metre medley relay, three FINA World Aquatics Championships, winning a further silver in the 100m breaststroke, and two bronze medals, and England at three Commonwealth Games, where he has won four other medals aside from his four gold medals.

Wilby's career has overlapped those of several other internationally significant British breaststrokers, notably Olympic and Commonwealth medalist Michael Jamieson, Commonwealth and European champion Ross Murdoch and multiple Olympic and World champion Adam Peaty. In 2022 Wilby became the first swimmer to defeat Peaty in an international 100 metres breaststroke race since Peaty first won the World title, claiming the Commonwealth gold medal in the event in Birmingham in 2022. Weeks later, he won his first individual European title in the 200 metres breaststroke.

== Career ==
=== 2010 ===
Finishing the 2009 season with a modest personal best time of 2:32.64 in the 200 metres breaststroke, Wilby took a chunk off this in May, swimming a 2:26.60 to qualify for the National Youth Championships. A then 16-year-old Wilby came in under the radar, setting a new personal best of 2:24.89 in the heats – qualifying 6th fastest for the semi-finals. A small improvement of 2:24.70 was enough to finish in 9th place in the semi-final, beating a then-unknown Adam Peaty. In the final, Wilby swam the best race of his life so far, again surpassing his PB and winning the National 15/16 years title in an impressive 2:20.13.

Wilby went on to win bronze in the 100 metres breaststroke with a time of 1:04.57 – the gold on this occasion going to Rio Olympian Craig Benson.

=== 2014 ===
At the 2014 Commonwealth Games, Wilby competed in all three breaststroke events; qualifying for the final in the 200 m - where he placed 6th in a time of 2:11.53 and the 100 m where he placed 7th in a time of 1:01.07. He was also part of the English team that won gold in the 4 × 100 meter medley relay event, swimming in the heats but not in the final.

=== 2018 ===
At the 2018 Commonwealth Games, Wilby won a surprise gold in the 200 metre breaststroke event with a winning time of 2:08.05, which is the fourth fastest time in the world this year (correct as of 3 August 2018). He also won a silver behind compatriot Adam Peaty in the 100 meter breaststroke with a personal best time of 59.43 seconds, and a bronze in the 50 metre breaststroke.

At the 2018 European Aquatics Championships, Wilby won heat four in the 100 metre breaststroke in a new personal best time of 59.12 qualifying second fastest for the final in 59.23. In the final, Wilby set a personal best time of 58.64 to win the silver medal, and became the equal fourth fastest 100m breaststroker in history; behind Brendan Rickard (58.58), Cameron Van Der Burgh's Olympic Gold from 2012 (58.44) and the winner of the European 100m title itself, Adam Peaty, who won in a world record time of 57.10*. The following day he added another silver medal in the 200 metre breaststroke.

=== 2019 ===
Wilby opened his 2019 long course season, with a 59.42 in the 100m and 2:09.71 in the 200m, taking three British University titles and records. At the World Championship Trials, Wilby took silver behind Adam Peaty, in the 100m in the third fastest time in the world this year of 58.66, then took the British title in the 200m with a time of 2:07.49. Wilby also had a 27.20 heat swim in the 50 breaststroke.

At the 2019 World Aquatics Championships, Wilby won his first World Championships medal after he won silver behind Peaty. He became the equal third fastest 100m breaststroke swimmer in history with a time of 58.46 that matches Cameron Van Der Bergh's London Olympic gold medal swim, which was a world record at the time. He also won a bronze as part of the team in the 4 × 100 m mixed medley relay. He swam in the heats but not in the final. Wilby also swam in the heats of the men's 4 × 100 meter medley relay. The final was won by Luke Greenbank, Adam Peaty, Duncan Scott, Duncan Scott in a European record time of three minutes, 28.10 seconds, and the gold medal is Britain's first in the event at the World Championships.

=== 2020 ===
Wilby joined the US-based team - New York Breakers - for the second season of the International Swimming League.

Wilby was one of the 2019 individual world championship medal-winners who were pre-selected for the postponed 2020 Tokyo Olympics.

=== 2021–2022 ===
In May 2021, Wilby won a bronze medal in 100m breaststroke at the European Championships.

At the 2022 World Aquatics Championships held in Budapest, Wilby won a bronze as part of the team in Men's 4 × 100 metre medley relay.

At the 2022 Commonwealth Games, Wilby pulled off a surprise win in 100 m breaststroke, beating reigning champion Adam Peaty to fourth.

=== 2023–2024 ===
In 2023, he won two gold medals at the 2023 British Swimming Championships in the 100 metres breaststroke and the 200 metres breaststroke. It was the first time he had won the 100 metres event but the fourth consecutive time that he had won the 200 metres title.

Wilby won the 200 metres breaststroke at the 2024 Aquatics GB Swimming Championships and was subsequently named in the British team for the 2024 Summer Olympics. At the 2024 Olympic Games in Paris, he participated in the men's 100 metre breaststroke competition, where he was eliminated in the semi-finals.

== Career best times ==
=== Long course (50-metre pool) ===
All details correct as of 15 May 2019

Event	Time	Venue	Date
200 m breaststroke	2:07.49	Tolcross, Glasgow	19 April 2019
100 m breaststroke	58.46	Gwangju, South Korea	22 July 2019
50 m breaststroke	27.20	Tolcross, Glasgow	17 April 2019

Wilby's 100 metres breaststroke personal best of 58.46 puts him second on the British all-time list behind world record holder Adam Peaty. Over 200 metres, Wilby is ranked third on the British all-time list, 0.06 behind the 2012 Olympic Silver medal winning performance from Michael Jamieson, and Ross Murdoch, who set the British record on his way to triumph at the 2014 Commonwealth Games.

Wilby made a huge breakthrough at the start of the 2018 season in the 50 metres, smashing through the 28-second barrier for the first time in his career. Then in 2019, took another 0.17 off his best time to become the second fastest in British history, behind World record holder Adam Peaty.
