= Ponds Forge =

Pool and sport hall in Sheffield, South Yorkshire, England

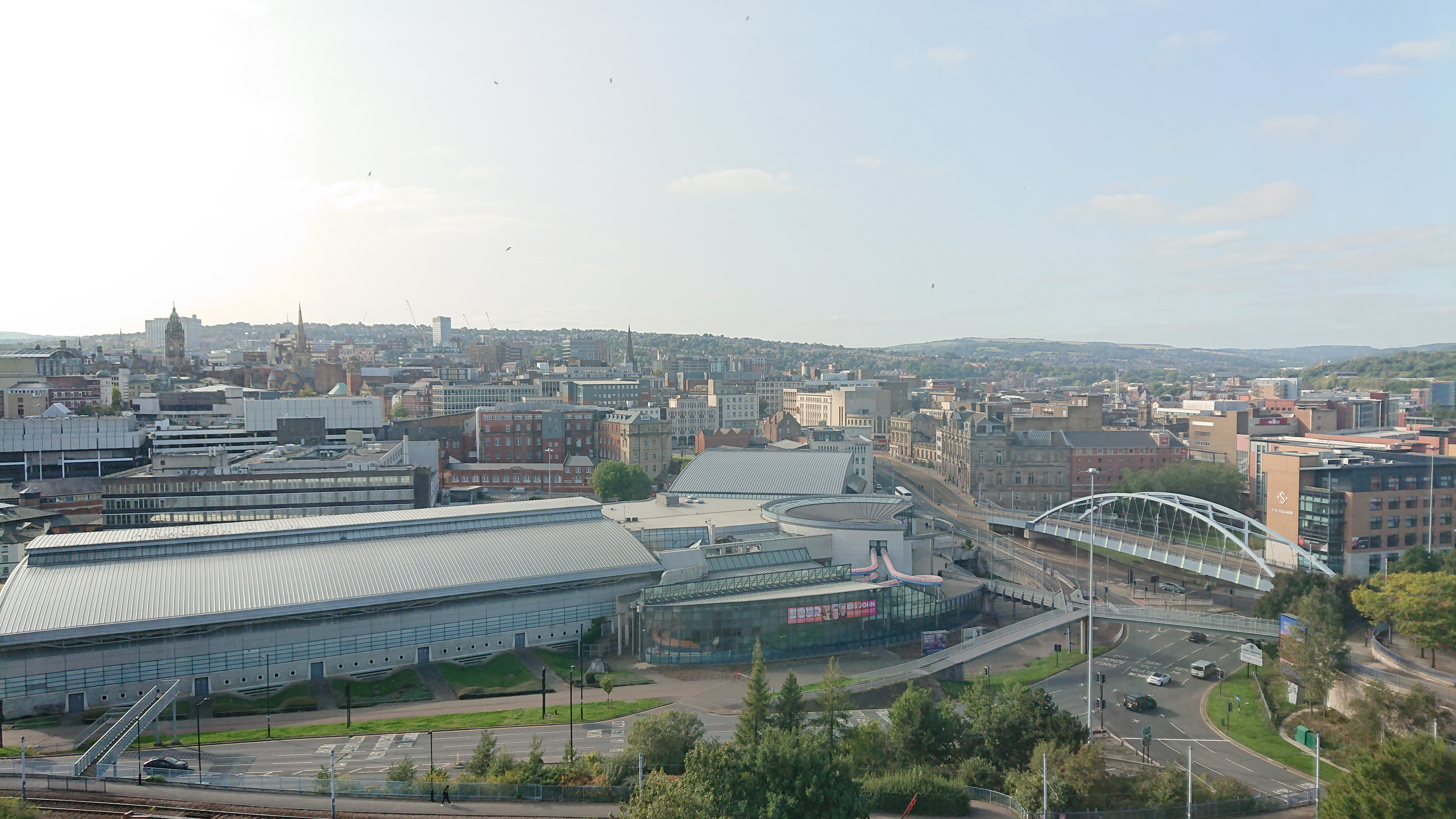
- Ponds Forge in the left of the foreground as viewed from Park Hill
- Interactive map of Ponds Forge
- Full name: Ponds Forge International Sports Centre
- Location: Sheffield, England
- Coordinates: 53°22′56″N 1°27′43″W
- Owner: Sheffield City Council
- Operator: Everyone Active
- Public transit: B P Y TT; Fitzalan Square / Ponds Forge

Construction
- Opened: May 1991

Ponds Forge International Sports Centre is a multipurpose sports centre and leisure complex in Sheffield, England. The facility has a 2,600 seating capacity Olympic-sized swimming pool and diving pit, a leisure pool, a 10-court indoor sports hall, in addition to multiple gyms and fitness studios.

== History ==
Ponds Forge was opened in 1991 ahead of the 1991 Summer Universiade, which the facility was a host venue.

The 1993 European Swimming Championships were held at the pool. During the event Karoly Guttler of Hungary went 1.00.95 in the heats of the Mens 100m Breast stroke to set a new world record. As of May 2026 it has been the only Long Course world record set at Ponds Forge.

In the 1994 UK Sports Design Awards, Ponds Forge won British Steel award for the best use of steel in construction, and was highly commented in the overall category.

In the 2000s Ponds Forge was a venue for Channel 4 series The Games, in which celebrities competed against each other in a wide range of events.

== Facilities ==
=== Olympic-sized swimming pool ===
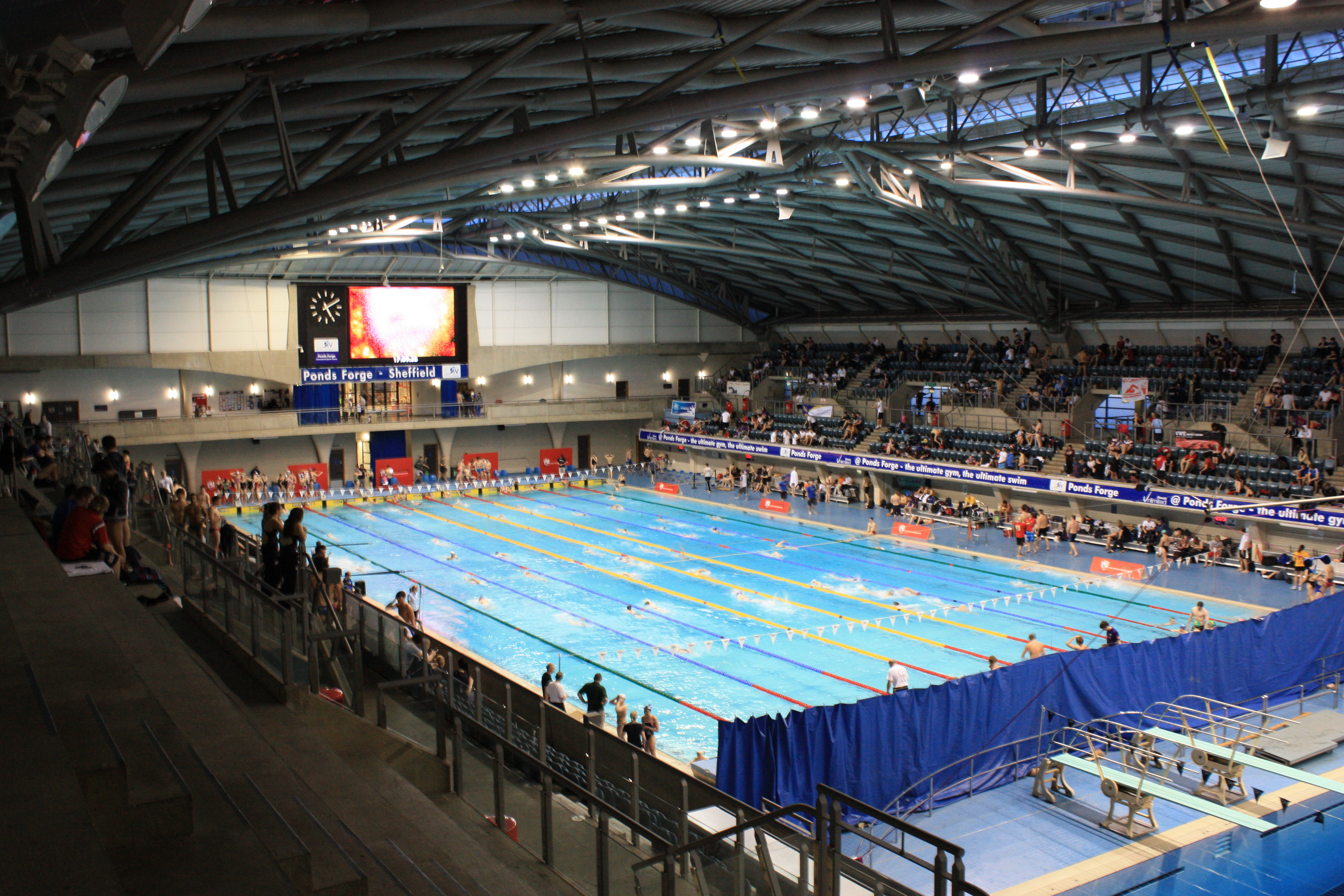
The swimming pool at Ponds Forge

The swimming pool hosted the 1993 European Aquatics Championships (including the Men's European Water Polo Championship). It has also hosted the 2006 Underwater Hockey World Championships, in addition to the junior world championships in 2019. The pool is also used for the national underwater hockey competitions run by the British Octopush Association.

=== Diving pool ===
Ponds Forge has Europe's deepest diving pool at 5.85 metres. This pool hosted the FINA World Diving Series Championships in April 2011 and was home to USA Diving Squad for the London 2012 Olympic and Paralympic Games. It is also home to the City of Sheffield Water Polo Club, a first division water polo team.

=== Surf City leisure pool ===
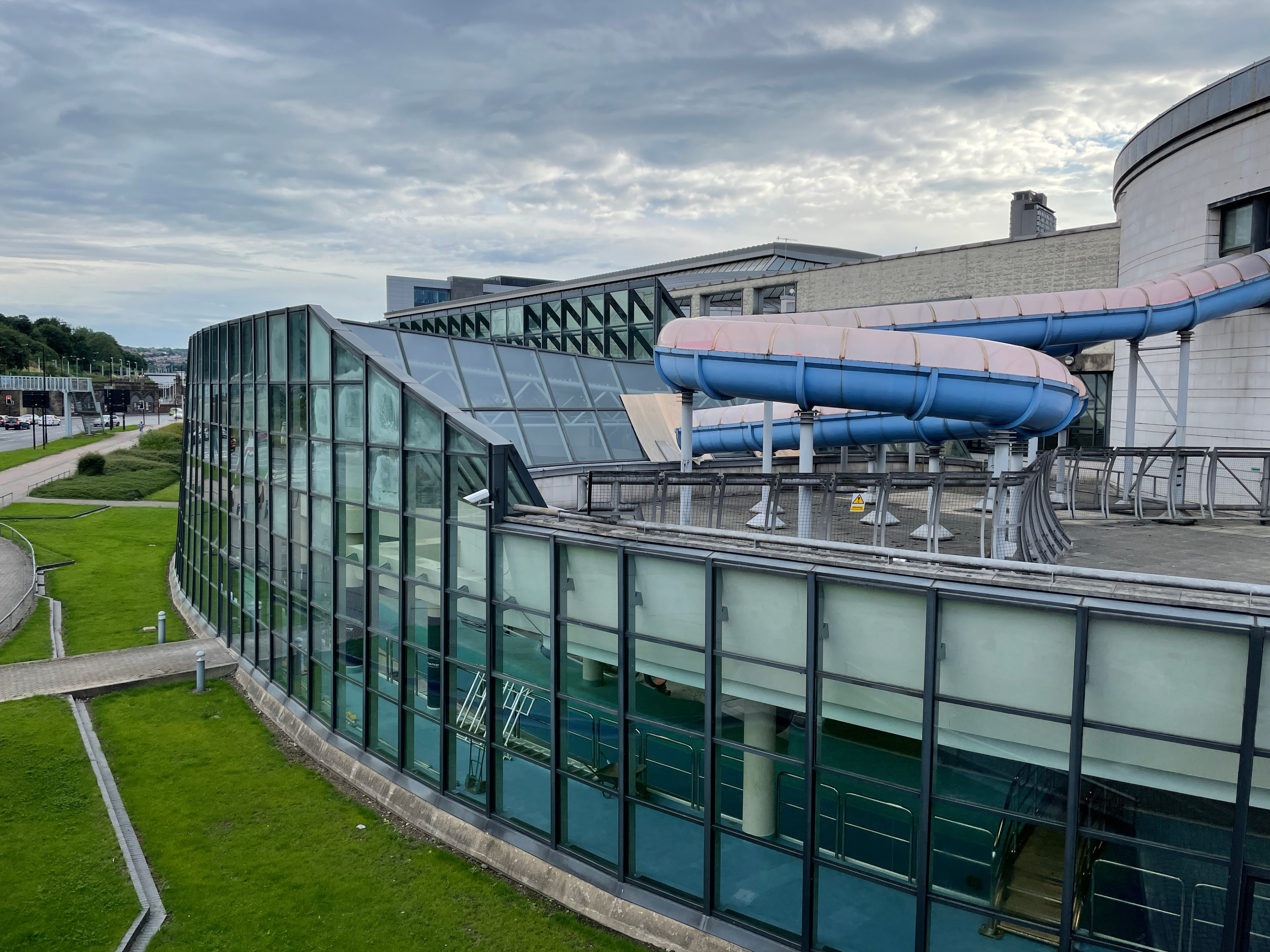
Exterior of Surf City leisure pool

Surf City leisure pool includeds a 25 metre lane pool, a lazy river that goes around the outside of the pool, slides, a smaller and shallower children's with, a sensory wall, fountains, and a mini slide, and a leisure pod for disabled swimmers equipped with a disabled hoist.

=== Gym ===
The 140-piece gym was refurbished in 2008.

=== Sports hall ===
The 10-court sports hall can facilitate badminton, table tennis, netball, volleyball, basketball, and indoor football. In 2026, the sports hall became the home venue of Sheffield Eagles wheelchair rugby league team who play in the RFL Wheelchair Super League.

== See also ==
- List of long-course swimming pools in the United Kingdom
