= Harriet Jones (swimmer) =

Welsh swimmer (born 1997)

Personal information
- Full name: Harriet Zoe H. Jones
- Nationality: British (Welsh)
- Born: 27 May 1997 (age 29) Cardiff, Wales

Sport
- Sport: Swimming
Medal record
Representing Great Britain
European Championships (LC)
Gold medal – first place	2020 Budapest	4×100 m medley
Gold medal – first place	2020 Budapest	4×100 m mixed medley

Harriet Zoe H. Jones (born 27 May 1997) is a Welsh swimmer. She competed in the women's 100 metre butterfly event at the 2020 European Aquatics Championships, in Budapest, Hungary, reaching the semi-finals.

Jones who became the 50m Butterfly Welsh record holder in 2021 and she won the 100m Butterfly Olympic trial and she was named as a member of the British team to go to the postponed 2020 Olympics in April.
