= Aquatics GB Swimming Championships =

Series of British Swimming Championships

- Date: Usually April
- Frequency: Annual
- Venue: London
- Inaugurated: 1946
- Organiser: Aquatics GB

The Aquatics GB Swimming Championships are the national swimming championships of Great Britain, organised by Aquatics GB, the national governing body for swimming, diving, artistic swimming and para-swimming in Great Britain. The championships bring together the country's best swimmers to compete for national titles and, in selected years, serve as the principal selection event for representing Great Britain major international competition.

== History ==
The event is usually held in April each year annually in a long course (50 m) swimming pool, with the results usually acting as selection trials for upcoming international level competitions due to be held in the following summer season.Over its history, the championships have therefore served both as the principal national championship for British swimmers and as an important selection event for Great Britain and Great Britain teams competing at major international competitions.

Previously the event was known as the Amateur Swimming Association (ASA) National Championships from 1946 until 2014 and then the British Swimming Championships from 2015 until 2023. A list of past winners shows the winners of all disciplines.

From 2024, the championships underwent a significant change with the introduction of a fully integrated swimming and para-swimming programme. The 2024 edition at the London Aquatics Centre combined Olympic and Paralympic swimming events within the same six-day competition programme for the first time. The event served as a selection opportunity for both the British Olympic and Paralympic swimming teams for the 2024 Summer Olympics and 2024 Summer Paralympics.

== Venues and dates ==
Year	Dates	Venue	Notes
1946	15–17 August	New Brighton, Cheshire	
1947	23–26 July	St Leonards-on-Sea	
1948	7–10 July	South and North Bay Open Air Pools, Scarborough	
1949	21–23 July	Derby	
1950	27–29 July	Lancaster	
1951	23–25 August	Lancaster	
1952	24–27 September	King Alfred Baths, Hove	
1953	31 August – 5 September	Derby Baths, Blackpool	
1954	13–18 September	Derby Baths, Blackpool	
1955	29 August – 5 September	Derby Baths, Blackpool	
1956	3–8 September	Derby Baths, Blackpool	
1957	9–14 September	Derby Baths, Blackpool	
1958	18-23 August	Derby Baths, Blackpool	
1959	1–5 September	Derby Baths, Blackpool	
1960	19–24 September	Derby Baths, Blackpool	
1961	27 August – 2 September	Derby Baths, Blackpool	
1962	10–14 September	Derby Baths, Blackpool	
1963	28–31 August	Derby Baths, Blackpool	
1964	18–22 August	Crystal Palace National Sports Centre	
1965	9–14 August	Derby Baths, Blackpool	
1966	6–10 September	Derby Baths, Blackpool	
1967	9–12 August	Derby Baths, Blackpool	
1968	5–10 August	Derby Baths, Blackpool	Olympic Games Trials
1969	4–10 August	Derby Baths, Blackpool	
1970	5–8 August	Derby Baths, Blackpool	
1971	5–9 August	Leeds International Pool	
1972	12–15 July	Crystal Palace National Sports Centre	
1973	1–4 August	Coventry	
1974	17–20 July	Derby Baths, Blackpool	
1975	21–25 May	Crystal Palace National Sports Centre	World Championships Trials
1976	25–29 August	Crystal Palace National Sports Centre	
1977	20–23 July	Leeds International Pool	
1978	26–29 May	Derby Baths, Blackpool	
1979			
1980	23–27 May	Derby Baths, Blackpool	
1981	5–8 August	Leeds International Pool	
1982	19–22 August	Crystal Palace National Sports Centre	
1983	21–24 July	Coventry	
1984	15–18 August	Derby Baths, Blackpool	
1985	22–27 August	Leeds International Pool	
1986	31 May – 2 June	Coventry	Commonwealth Games Trials
1987	29 July – 1 Aug	Crystal Palace National Sports Centre	
1988	27–31 July	Leeds International Pool	
1989	12–15 July	Coventry	
1990	26–30 July	Crystal Palace National Sports Centre	European Cup Trials
1991	1–4 August	Leeds International Pool	
1992	11–14 June	Ponds Forge, Sheffield	
1993	10–13 June	Ponds Forge, Sheffield	
1994	28–31 July	Crystal Palace National Sports Centre	
1995	19–22 July	Coventry	
1996	11–13 July	Leeds International Pool	
1997	17–20 July	Crystal Palace National Sports Centre	
1998	8–11 July	Ponds Forge, Sheffield	Commonwealth Games Trials
1999	8–11 July	Ponds Forge, Sheffield	
2000	25–30 July	Ponds Forge, Sheffield	Olympic Games Trials
2001	10–15 April	Manchester Aquatics Centre	World Championships Trials
2002	10–15 April	Manchester Aquatics Centre	Commonwealth Games Trials
2003	19–23 March	Ponds Forge, Sheffield	World Championships Trials
2004	7–11 April	Ponds Forge, Sheffield	Olympic Games Trials
2005	16–20 March	Manchester Aquatics Centre	World Championships Trials
2006	4–9 April	Ponds Forge, Sheffield	European Championships and European Junior Championships Trials
2007	26 March – 1 April	Manchester Aquatics Centre	
2008	31 March – 6 April	Ponds Forge, Sheffield	Olympic Games Trials
2009	16–20 March	Ponds Forge, Sheffield	World Championships Trials
2010	29 March – 3 April	Ponds Forge, Sheffield	European Championships Trials, Commonwealth Games Trials
2011	5–12 March	Manchester Aquatics Centre	World Championships Trials
2012	3–10 March	London Aquatics Centre	Olympic Trials, London Prepares series
2013	26–30 June	Ponds Forge, Sheffield	World Championships Trials
2014	10–15 April	Tollcross International Swimming Centre, Glasgow	Commonwealth Games Trials
2015	14–18 April	London Aquatics Centre	World Championships Trials
2016	12–17 April	Tollcross International Swimming Centre, Glasgow	Olympic Games Trials
2017	18–23 April	Ponds Forge, Sheffield	
2018	1–4 March	Royal Commonwealth Pool, Edinburgh	Merged with the Edinburgh International meet
2019	16–21 April	Tollcross International Swimming Centre, Glasgow	
2020	Cancelled due to the COVID-19 pandemic.		
2021	Replaced by selection trials for the delayed 2020 Summer Olympics.		
2022	5–10 April	Ponds Forge, Sheffield	World Championships Trials, Commonwealth Games Trials
2023	4–9 April	Ponds Forge, Sheffield	World Championships Trials
2024	2–7 April	London Aquatics Centre	Olympic Games Trials
2025	15–22 April	London Aquatics Centre	World Championships Trials
2026	14–21 April	London Aquatics Centre	European Championships Trials

== Sponsors ==
- 1971–1984 (Optrex)
- 1985–1987 (Hewlett-Packard)
- 1988–1990 (TSB)
- 1992–1992 (Optrex)
- 1993–1994 (Mycil)
- 2024–2026 (Speedo)

== See also ==
- Aquatics GB
- List of British Swimming champions
