= List of British Swimming champions =

British swimming champions

British swimming champions
- Frequency: annual
- Organiser: Aquatics GB

The governing body of swimming in the UK, Aquatics GB, organises annual British Championships in swimming. The event is usually held in March or April each year in a long course (50 m) swimming pool, with the results usually acting as selection trials for upcoming international level competitions due to be held in the following summer season.

This is a list of the British champions in the events held at these annual championships. The event remains 'Open' which has resulted in many swimmers of various nationalities claiming the title over the years.

== Venues and dates ==
For venues and dates see British Swimming Championships.

== See also ==
- British Swimming
