= Swimming at the 2018 European Aquatics Championships – Men's 200 metre freestyle =

Men's 200 metre freestyle at the 2018 European Aquatics Championships
- Venue: Tollcross International Swimming Centre
- Dates: 6 August (heats and semifinals); 7 August (final)
- Competitors: 62 from 27 nations
- Winning time: 1:45.34

Medalists
gold medal	Duncan Scott	Great Britain
silver medal	Danas Rapšys	Lithuania
bronze medal	Mikhail Dovgalyuk	Russia

The Men's 200 metre freestyle competition of the 2018 European Aquatics Championships was held on 6 and 7 August 2018.

== Records ==
Prior to the competition, the existing world and championship records were as follows.

	Name	Nation	Time	Location	Date
World record European record	Paul Biedermann	Germany	1:42.00	Rome	28 July 2009
Championship record	Pieter van den Hoogenband	Netherlands	1:44.89	Berlin	2 August 2002

== Results ==
=== Heats ===
The heats were started on 6 August at 09:30.

Rank	Heat	Lane	Name	Nationality	Time	Notes
1	7	4	Danas Rapšys	Lithuania	1:46.55	Q
2	7	3	Mikhail Vekovishchev	Russia	1:46.67	Q
3	5	4	James Guy	Great Britain	1:47.67	Q
4	7	2	Jan Świtkowski	Poland	1:48.09	Q
5	5	3	Filippo Megli	Italy	1:48.15	Q
6	6	6	Velimir Stjepanović	Serbia	1:48.22	Q
7	6	5	Mikhail Dovgalyuk	Russia	1:48.24	Q
8	6	2	Jacob Heidtmann	Germany	1:48.34	Q
9	5	2	Felix Auböck	Austria	1:48.37	Q
10	7	1	Denis Loktev	Israel	1:48.42	Q
11	6	4	Duncan Scott	Great Britain	1:48.53	Q
12	6	7	Jonathan Atsu	France	1:48.62	Q
13	6	9	Maarten Brzoskowski	Netherlands	1:48.72	Q
14	7	8	Nils Liess	Switzerland	1:49.00	Q
15	6	3	Calum Jarvis	Great Britain	1:49.19	
16	5	6	Viacheslav Andrusenko	Russia	1:49.21	
17	5	5	Kacper Majchrzak	Poland	1:49.23	Q
18	7	7	Kyle Stolk	Netherlands	1:49.34	Q
19	7	6	Nándor Németh	Hungary	1:49.41	
19	7	9	Robin Hanson	Sweden	1:49.41	
21	7	0	Alexandre Marcourt	Belgium	1:49.46	
22	5	9	Matteo Ciampi	Italy	1:49.47	
23	3	5	Álex Rámos	Spain	1:49.50	
24	3	4	Jan Hołub	Poland	1:49.55	
25	5	8	Roman Fuchs	France	1:49.61	
26	5	1	Jordan Pothain	France	1:49.62	
27	6	0	César Castro Valle	Spain	1:49.63	
28	4	1	Thomas Thijs	Belgium	1:49.69	
29	4	5	Mattia Zuin	Italy	1:49.72	
30	3	8	Erge Can Gezmiş	Turkey	1:49.88	
31	3	1	Miguel Nascimento	Portugal	1:49.90	
32	6	1	Martin Malyutin	Russia	1:49.97	
33	4	2	Stan Pijnenburg	Netherlands	1:50.02	
34	3	0	Alexander Trampitsch	Austria	1:50.06	
35	5	7	Cameron Kurle	Great Britain	1:50.08	
35	3	6	Daniel Namir	Israel	1:50.08	
37	3	2	Kregor Zirk	Estonia	1:50.21	
38	3	3	Marc Sánchez	Spain	1:50.22	
39	4	8	Miguel Durán	Spain	1:50.31	
40	4	6	Lorenz Weiremans	Belgium	1:50.35	
41	4	3	Dion Dreesens	Netherlands	1:50.47	
42	4	0	Sebastien De Meulemeester	Belgium	1:50.52	
43	4	7	Gustaf Dahlman	Sweden	1:50.53	
44	4	9	Adam Paulsson	Sweden	1:50.74	
45	6	8	Jordan Sloan	Ireland	1:50.76	
46	4	4	Stefano Di Cola	Italy	1:51.06	
47	3	7	Markus Lie	Norway	1:51.10	
48	2	3	Bence Biczó	Hungary	1:51.12	
49	2	8	Batuhan Hakan	Turkey	1:51.76	
50	2	5	Filip Zelić	Croatia	1:52.18	
51	2	4	Tomas Sungaila	Lithuania	1:53.17	
52	2	7	Irakli Revishvili	Georgia	1:54.58	
53	3	9	Yonatan Batsha	Israel	1:54.62	
54	2	6	Doğa Çelik	Turkey	1:54.91	
55	2	2	Andri Aedma	Estonia	1:55.10	
56	2	1	Nikita Tsernosev	Estonia	1:55.11	
57	2	9	Cristian Santi	San Marino	1:59.05	
58	1	5	Franc Aleksi	Albania	1:59.23	
59	1	4	Gianluca Pasolini	San Marino	1:59.36	
60	2	0	Matthew Galea	Malta	2:00.65	
61	1	6	Dren Ukimeraj	Kosovo	2:03.04	
62	1	3	Dijon Kadriju	Kosovo	2:05.00	
	7	5	Dominik Kozma	Hungary	Did not start	

=== Semifinals ===
The semifinals were started on 6 August at 17:21.

==== Semifinal 1 ====
Rank	Lane	Name	Nationality	Time	Notes
1	4	Mikhail Vekovishchev	Russia	1:46.70	Q
2	6	Jacob Heidtmann	Germany	1:46.83	Q
3	3	Velimir Stjepanović	Serbia	1:46.84	Q
4	5	Jan Świtkowski	Poland	1:47.77	
5	2	Denis Loktev	Israel	1:48.48	
6	7	Jonathan Atsu	France	1:48.62	
7	8	Kyle Stolk	Netherlands	1:48.63	
8	1	Nils Liess	Switzerland	1:48.76	

==== Semifinal 2 ====
Rank	Lane	Name	Nationality	Time	Notes
1	4	Danas Rapšys	Lithuania	1:45.33	Q
2	5	James Guy	Great Britain	1:46.44	Q
3	6	Mikhail Dovgalyuk	Russia	1:46.69	Q
4	3	Filippo Megli	Italy	1:46.70	Q
5	7	Duncan Scott	Great Britain	1:46.97	Q
6	8	Kacper Majchrzak	Poland	1:47.64	
7	2	Felix Auböck	Austria	1:47.81	
8	1	Maarten Brzoskowski	Netherlands	1:49.33	

=== Final ===
The final was started on 7 August at 17:18.

Rank	Lane	Name	Nationality	Time	Notes
1st place, gold medalist(s)	8	Duncan Scott	Great Britain	1:45.34	
2nd place, silver medalist(s)	4	Danas Rapšys	Lithuania	1:46.07	
3rd place, bronze medalist(s)	3	Mikhail Dovgalyuk	Russia	1:46.15	
4	5	James Guy	Great Britain	1:46.20	
5	2	Filippo Megli	Italy	1:46.60	
6	6	Mikhail Vekovishchev	Russia	1:46.79	
7	1	Velimir Stjepanović	Serbia	1:47.00	
8	7	Jacob Heidtmann	Germany	1:47.26	
