= Swimming at the 2019 World Aquatics Championships – Men's 4 × 200 metre freestyle relay =

International Event

Men's 4 × 200 metre freestyle relay at the 2019 World Aquatics Championships
- Venue: Nambu University Municipal Aquatics Center
- Location: Gwangju, South Korea
- Dates: 26 July (heats and final)
- Competitors: 96 from 22 nations
- Teams: 22
- Winning time: 7:00.85

Medalists
gold medal	Clyde Lewis; Kyle Chalmers; Alexander Graham; Mack Horton; Jack McLoughlin; Thomas Fraser-Holmes	Australia
silver medal	Mikhail Dovgalyuk; Mikhail Vekovishchev; Aleksandr Krasnykh; Martin Malyutin; Ivan Girev	Russia
bronze medal	Andrew Seliskar; Blake Pieroni; Zach Apple; Townley Haas; Jack Conger; Jack LeVant	United States

The Men's 4 × 200 metre freestyle relay competition at the 2019 World Championships was held on 26 July 2019.

== Records ==
Prior to the competition, the existing world and championship records were as follows.

World record	United States	6:58.55	Rome, Italy	31 July 2009
Competition record	United States	6:58.55	Rome, Italy	31 July 2009

== Results ==
=== Heats ===
The heats were held on 26 July at 11:26.

Rank	Heat	Lane	Nation	Swimmers	Time	Notes
1	3	6	Italy	Filippo Megli (1:46.79); Matteo Ciampi (1:46.42); Stefano Ballo (1:45.66); Stefano Di Cola (1:46.10)	7:04.97	Q
2	2	3	Russia	Aleksandr Krasnykh (1:46.58); Mikhail Dovgalyuk (1:46.28); Ivan Girev (1:47.01); Mikhail Vekovishchev (1:45.41)	7:05.28	Q
3	3	4	United States	Andrew Seliskar (1:45.71); Jack Conger (1:47.99); Jack LeVant (1:47.57); Zach Apple (1:45.59)	7:06.86	Q
4	2	4	Australia	Alexander Graham (1:46.41); Jack McLoughlin (1:46.80); Thomas Fraser-Holmes (1:47.20); Mack Horton (1:46.56)	7:06.97	Q
5	3	3	China	Ji Xinjie (1:46.26); Wang Shun (1:47.40); Sun Yang (1:46.08); Xu Jiayu (1:47.31)	7:07.05	Q
6	3	2	Brazil	Luiz Altamir Melo (1:47.51); Fernando Scheffer (1:45.94); João de Lucca (1:47.64); Breno Correia (1:46.03)	7:07.12	Q, SA
7	2	5	Great Britain	Thomas Dean (1:47.34); Calum Jarvis (1:45.94); Max Litchfield (1:48.20); Cameron Kurle (1:46.97)	7:08.45	Q
7	2	6	Germany	Poul Zellmann (1:48.29); Rafael Miroslaw (1:46.89); Jacob Heidtmann (1:45.78); Damian Wierling (1:47.49)	7:08.45	Q
9	3	5	Japan	Kotaro Takahashi (1:48.18); Katsuhiro Matsumoto (1:45.31); Keisuke Yoshida (1:47.72); Daiya Seto (1:48.02)	7:09.23	
10	3	1	Israel	Denis Loktev (1:48.55); Daniel Namir (1:47.96); Tomer Frankel (1:47.95); Gal Cohen Groumi (1:47.53)	7:11.99	NR
11	2	9	Poland	Jan Świtkowski (1:48.20); Jan Holub (1:48.51); Jakub Kraska (1:47.30); Kacper Majchrzak (1:48.00)	7:12.01	
12	2	8	Switzerland	Antonio Djakovic (1:47.62); Nils Liess (1:47.28); Aleksi Schmid (1:48.22); Jérémy Desplanches (1:48.96)	7:12.08	NR
13	3	8	Belgium	Louis Croenen (1:48.26); Alexandre Marcourt (1:48.33); Thomas Thijs (1:49.48); Sebastien De Meulemeester (1:46.92)	7:12.99	
14	1	5	New Zealand	Lewis Clareburt (1:47.97); Matthew Stanley (1:48.10); Daniel Hunter (1:48.88); Zac Reid (1:48.11)	7:13.06	NR
15	2	1	Hungary	Dominik Kozma (1:46.33); Péter Bernek (1:48.98); Ákos Kalmár (1:51.41); Nándor Németh (1:46.92)	7:13.64	
16	1	4	Ireland	Jack McMillan (1:48.00); Robert Powell (1:48.84); Jordan Sloan (1:47.84); Brendan Hyland (1:49.23)	7:13.91	NR
17	2	2	Canada	Markus Thormeyer (1:48.37); Alexander Pratt (1:49.45); Jeremy Bagshaw (1:48.07); Carson Olafson (1:48.12)	7:14.01	
18	2	7	South Korea	Lee Yoo-yeon (1:48.30); Jang Dong-hyeok (1:49.13); Hwang Sun-woo (1:49.78); Lee Ho-joon (1:47.84)	7:15.05	NR
19	1	3	Serbia	Velimir Stjepanović (1:47.79); Aleksa Bobar (1:49.43); Vuk Čelić (1:48.79); Andrej Barna (1:49.30)	7:15.31	NR
20	2	0	Portugal	Miguel Nascimento (1:48.00); Alexis Santos (1:47.68); Tomás Veloso (1:49.83); Diogo Carvalho (1:52.41)	7:17.92	
21	3	7	Singapore	Quah Zheng Wen (1:48.29); Darren Chua Yi Shou (1:48.69); Jonathan Tan Eu Jin (1:50.19); Glen Lim Jun Wei (1:50.95)	7:18.12	
22	3	0	Chinese Taipei	Wang Hao (1:51.61); Wang Kuan-hung (1:51.68); An Ting-yao (1:51.21); Wang Hsing-hao (1:49.28)	7:23.78	
	3	9	Egypt		DNS	

=== Final ===
The final was held on 26 July at 21:42.

Rank	Lane	Name	Nationality	Time	Notes
1st place, gold medalist(s)	6	Australia	Clyde Lewis (1:45.58); Kyle Chalmers (1:45.37); Alexander Graham (1:45.05); Mack Horton (1:44.85)	7:00.85	OC
2nd place, silver medalist(s)	5	Russia	Mikhail Dovgalyuk (1:45.56); Mikhail Vekovishchev (1:45.45); Aleksandr Krasnykh (1:45.38); Martin Malyutin (1:45.42)	7:01.81	
3rd place, bronze medalist(s)	3	United States	Andrew Seliskar (1:45.81); Blake Pieroni (1:44.98); Zach Apple (1:46.03); Townley Haas (1:45.16)	7:01.98	
4	4	Italy	Filippo Megli (1:45.86); Gabriele Detti (1:45.30); Stefano Ballo (1:45.27); Stefano Di Cola (1:45.58)	7:02.01	NR
5	1	Great Britain	Duncan Scott (1:44.91) NR; Calum Jarvis (1:45.58); Thomas Dean (1:46.10); James Guy (1:45.45)	7:02.04	
6	2	China	Ji Xinjie (1:45.48); Wang Shun (1:46.17); Xu Jiayu (1:48.13); Sun Yang (1:44.96)	7:04.74	=NR
7	7	Brazil	Luiz Altamir Melo (1:47.72); Fernando Scheffer (1:45.97); João de Lucca (1:47.11); Breno Correia (1:46.84)	7:07.64	
8	8	Germany	Poul Zellmann (1:47.19); Rafael Miroslaw (1:47.20); Jacob Heidtmann (1:46.16); Damian Wierling (1:47.10)	7:07.65	
