= Swimming at the 2020 Summer Olympics – Men's 4 × 200 metre freestyle relay =

Men's 4 × 200 metre freestyle relay at the Games of the XXXII Olympiad
- Venue: Tokyo Aquatics Centre
- Dates: 27 July 2021 (heats); 28 July 2021 (final)
- Competitors: 73 from 16 nations
- Teams: 16
- Winning time: 6:58.58 ER

Medalists
1st place, gold medalist(s)		Thomas Dean, James Guy, Matthew Richards, Duncan Scott, Calum Jarvis*	Great Britain
2nd place, silver medalist(s)		Martin Malyutin, Ivan Girev, Evgeny Rylov, Mikhail Dovgalyuk, Aleksandr Krasnykh*, Mikhail Vekovishchev*	ROC
3rd place, bronze medalist(s)		Alexander Graham, Kyle Chalmers, Zac Incerti, Thomas Neill, Mack Horton*, Elijah Winnington*; *Indicates the swimmer only competed in the preliminary heats.	Australia

The Men's 4 × 200 metre freestyle relay was a swimming event at the 2020 Summer Olympics and occurred on 27 and 28 July 2021 at the Tokyo Aquatics Centre. It was the event's twenty-sixth consecutive appearance, having been held at every edition since 1908.

The medals for competition were presented by IOC Member David Haggerty, and the gifts were presented by Qatar's FINA Bureau Member Khaleel Al Jabir.

== Summary ==
After achieving a quinella in the individual 200 m freestyle, Great Britain duly upgraded their silver from Rio five years earlier with an Olympic title. Led off by the 200 freestyle Olympic champion Tom Dean in a time of 1:45.72 – 1.5 seconds off his winning time – Great Britain fell almost a second behind the pace of the Americans. However, the British team's cumulative depth eventually told as the 2015 World champion at the distance, James Guy (1:44.40), moved the team into the lead before youngster Matthew Richards (1:45.01) extended the margin over the field from 0.13 to 1.45 seconds. Duncan Scott, the silver medallist behind Dean, split a sterling 1:43.45 – the quickest in the field – to anchor the British home to an Olympic record of 6:58.58, just 0.03 seconds outside the world record.

Meanwhile, Russia's Martin Malyutin (1:45.69), Ivan Giryov (1:45.63) and 100 m backstroke champion Evgeny Rylov (1:45.26) handed over the anchor leg duties to Mikhail Dovgalyuk (1:45.23), who held off Australia's Thomas Neill by 0.03 seconds to secure the ROC the silver in 7:01.81. With Australia in fourth heading into the final changeover after swims from Alexander Graham (1:46.00), Kyle Chalmers (1:45.35) and Zac Incerti (1:45.75), Neill blasted a 1:44.74 split to deliver the quartet a bronze medal in 7:01.84.

The U.S. failed to win a relay medal (when entering an event) for the first time in Olympic swimming history. Kieran Smith (1:44.81) had the U.S. in the lead before handing over to Drew Kibler (1:45.51), who was overtaken by Great Britain's Guy to touch in second. Coming off the 100 free semi-finals earlier in the session, third swimmer Zach Apple (1:47.31) faded over the closing stages of his leg to fall behind the Italians and Australians. Though the U.S.' anchor Townley Haas (1:44.87) surpassed Italy's Stefano Di Cola (1:46.26), he could not close the gap on the Australians as the U.S. settled for fourth in 7:02.43. In podium contention at the final changeover, Italy's foursome of Stefano Ballo (1:45.77), Matteo Ciampi (1:45.88), Filippo Megli (1:45.33) and Di Cola missed the medals to take fifth in 7:03.24.

Led off by Antonio Djakovic, who clocked a Swiss record of 1:45.77, Switzerland's quartet also touched in a national record of 7:06.12 to claim sixth. Germany (7:06.51) and Brazil (7:08.22), led off by the bronze medalist in the individual 200 m Fernando Scheffer, rounded out the championship field.

== Records ==
Prior to this competition, the existing world and Olympic records were as follows.

World record	United States (USA); Michael Phelps (1:44.49); Ricky Berens (1:44.13); David Walters (1:45.47); Ryan Lochte (1:44.46)	6:58.55	Rome, Italy	31 July 2009
Olympic record	United States; Michael Phelps (1:43.31); Ryan Lochte (1:44.28); Ricky Berens (1:46.29); Peter Vanderkaay (1:44.68)	6:58.56	Beijing, China	13 August 2008

No new Olympic or World records were set during the competition.

Great Britain set a European record in the final, the third-fastest time ever (behind only the Olympic and World records) and the fastest time ever swum in a textile suit. Israel and Switzerland (twice) set national records.

== Qualification ==
The top 12 teams in this event at the 2019 World Aquatics Championships qualified for the Olympics. An additional 4 teams will qualify through having the fastest times at approved qualifying events during the qualifying period (1 March 2019 to 30 May 2020).

== Competition format ==
The competition consists of two rounds: heats and a final. The relay teams with the best 8 times in the heats advance to the final. Swim-offs are used as necessary to break ties for advancement to the next round.

== Schedule ==
All times are Japan Standard Time (UTC+9)

Date	Time	Round
27 July	19:58	Heats
28 July	12:26	Final

== Results ==
=== Heats ===
The relay teams with the top 8 times, regardless of heat, advanced to the final.

Rank	Heat	Lane	Nation	Swimmers	Time	Notes
1	2	3	Great Britain	Matthew Richards (1:46.35); James Guy (1:44.66); Calum Jarvis (1:45.53); Thomas Dean (1:46.71)	7:03.25	Q
2	2	4	Australia	Alexander Graham (1:45.72); Mack Horton (1:47.51); Elijah Winnington (1:46.19); Zac Incerti (1:45.58)	7:05.00	Q
3	1	5	Italy	Stefano Di Cola (1:47.00); Matteo Ciampi (1:45.64); Marco De Tullio (1:46.78); Filippo Megli (1:45.63)	7:05.05	Q
4	1	4	ROC	Mikhail Dovgalyuk (1:46.56); Aleksandr Krasnykh (1:46.78); Ivan Girev (1:45.71); Mikhail Vekovishchev (1:46.11)	7:05.16	Q
5	2	5	United States	Drew Kibler (1:46.12); Andrew Seliskar (1:46.17); Patrick Callan (1:47.12); Blake Pieroni (1:46.21)	7:05.62	Q
6	1	7	Switzerland	Antonio Djakovic (1:46.41); Nils Liess (1:47.23); Noè Ponti (1:47.11); Roman Mityukov (1:45.84)	7:06.59	Q, NR
7	2	2	Germany	Lukas Märtens (1:47.27); Poul Zellmann (1:45.80); Henning Mühlleitner (1:48.11); Jacob Heidtmann (1:45.58)	7:06.76	Q
8	2	6	Brazil	Luiz Altamir Melo (1:48.01); Fernando Scheffer (1:46.09); Murilo Sartori (1:46.76); Breno Correia (1:46.87)	7:07.73	Q
9	1	3	China	Ji Xinjie (1:47.14); Hong Jinquan (1:48.17); Zhang Ziyang (1:46.89); Wang Shun (1:46.07)	7:08.27	
10	1	1	Israel	Denis Loktev (1:46.64 NR); Daniel Namir (1:47.41); Tomer Frankel (1:48.19); Gal Cohen Groumi (1:46.41)	7:08.65	NR
11	1	6	France	Jordan Pothain (1:47.30); Hadrien Salvan (1:48.09); Enzo Tesic (1:46.84); Jonathan Atsu (1:46.65)	7:08.88	
12	2	7	Japan	Konosuke Yanagimoto (1:48.50); Katsuhiro Matsumoto (1:45.35); Kosuke Hagino (1:47.90); Kotaro Takahashi (1:47.78)	7:09.53	
13	2	1	South Korea	Lee Yoo-yeon (1:49.55); Hwang Sun-woo (1:48.88); Kim Woo-min (1:49.24); Lee Ho-joon (1:47.36)	7:15.03	
14	2	8	Ireland	Jack McMillan (1:46.66 NR); Finn McGeever (1:48.46); Brendan Hyland (1:51.28); Shane Ryan (1:49.08)	7:15.48	
15	1	8	Poland	Kacper Majchrzak (1:49.32); Jakub Kraska (1:47.94); Kamil Sieradzki (1:50.44); Radosław Kawęcki (1:51.21)	7:18.91	
	1	2	Hungary	Balázs Holló (1:47.41); Gabor Zombori (1:47.27); Dominik Kozma; Richárd Márton	DSQ	

=== Final ===
Rank	Lane	Nation	Swimmers	Time	Notes
1st place, gold medalist(s)	4	Great Britain	Thomas Dean (1:45.72); James Guy (1:44.40); Matthew Richards (1:45.01); Duncan Scott (1:43.45)	6:58.58	ER
2nd place, silver medalist(s)	6	ROC	Martin Malyutin (1:45.69); Ivan Giryov (1:45.63); Evgeny Rylov (1:45.26); Mikhail Dovgalyuk (1:45.23)	7:01.81	
3rd place, bronze medalist(s)	5	Australia	Alexander Graham (1:46.00); Kyle Chalmers (1:45.35); Zac Incerti (1:45.75); Thomas Neill (1:44.74)	7:01.84	
4	2	United States	Kieran Smith (1:44.74); Drew Kibler (1:45.51); Zach Apple (1:47.31); Townley Haas (1:44.87)	7:02.43	
5	3	Italy	Stefano Ballo (1:45.77); Matteo Ciampi (1:45.88); Filippo Megli (1:45.33); Stefano Di Cola (1:46.26)	7:03.24	
6	7	Switzerland	Antonio Djakovic (1:45.77 NR); Nils Liess (1:47.74); Noè Ponti (1:46.93); Roman Mityukov (1:45.68)	7:06.12	NR
7	1	Germany	Lukas Märtens (1:46.68); Poul Zellmann (1:46.30); Henning Mühlleitner (1:48.04); Jacob Heidtmann (1:45.49)	7:06.51	
8	8	Brazil	Fernando Scheffer (1:45.93); Murilo Sartori (1:46.09); Breno Correia (1:48.11); Luiz Altamir Melo (1:48.09)	7:08.22	
