= 2018 FINA World Swimming Championships (25 m) – Men's 4 × 200 metre freestyle relay =

Men's 4 × 200 metre freestyle relay at the 2018 FINA World Swimming Championships (25 m)
- Venue: Hangzhou Sports Park Stadium
- Dates: 14 December (heats and final)
- Nations: 13
- Winning time: 6:46.81 WR

Medalists
gold medal	Luiz Altamir Melo; Fernando Scheffer; Leonardo Coelho Santos; Breno Correia; Leonardo de Deus	Brazil
silver medal	Martin Malyutin; Mikhail Vekovishchev; Ivan Girev; Aleksandr Krasnykh; Mikhail Dovgalyuk; Vladislav Grinev	Russia
bronze medal	Ji Xinjie; Xu Jiayu; Sun Yang; Wang Shun; Shang Keyuan; Qian Zhiyong	China

The Men's 4 × 200 metre freestyle relay competition of the 2018 FINA World Swimming Championships (25 m) was held on 14 December 2018.

== Records ==
Prior to the competition, the existing world and championship records were as follows.

	Name	Nation	Time	Location	Date
World record Championship record	Nikita Lobintsev (1:42.10); Danila Izotov (1:42.15); Yevgeny Lagunov (1:42.32); Alexander Sukhorukov (1:42.47)	Russia	6:49.04	Dubai, UAE	16 December 2010

The following records were established during the competition:

Date	Event	Name	Nation	Time	Record
14 December	Final	Luiz Altamir Melo (1:42.03); Fernando Scheffer (1:40.99); Leonardo Coelho Santos (1:42.81); Breno Correia (1:40.87)	Brazil	6:46.81	WR

== Results ==
=== Heats ===
The heats were started on 14 December at 11:10.

Rank	Heat	Lane	Nation	Swimmers	Time	Notes
1	2	5	Russia	Mikhail Dovgalyuk (1:43.58); Ivan Girev (1:42.31); Vladislav Grinev (1:43.02); Aleksandr Krasnykh (1:42.26)	6:51.17	Q
2	1	5	United States	Kieran Smith (1:43.30); Jack Conger (1:43.33); Jacob Pebley (1:43.50); Zach Harting (1:42.68)	6:52.81	Q
3	1	3	Italy	Filippo Megli (1:43.31); Matteo Ciampi (1:43.40); Alessio Proietti Colonna (1:44.75); Mattia Zuin (1:44.51)	6:55.97	Q
4	1	4	China	Ji Xinjie (1:43.04); Sun Yang (1:43.01); Shang Keyuan (1:45.34); Qian Zhiyong (1:44.69)	6:56.08	Q
5	2	4	Australia	Thomas Fraser-Holmes (1:44.20); Jack Gerrard (1:42.94); Louis Townsend (1:46.32); Alexander Graham (1:44.28)	6:57.74	Q
6	2	1	Brazil	Fernando Scheffer (1:43.40); Luiz Altamir Melo (1:43.64); Leonardo de Deus (1:46.29); Breno Correia (1:44.93)	6:58.26	Q
7	2	6	Sweden	Gustaf Dahlman (1:45.23); Simon Sjödin (1:44.74); Adam Paulsson (1:46.03); Christoffer Carlsen (1:43.91)	6:59.91	Q
8	2	2	Portugal	Miguel Nascimento (1:44.92); Alexis Santos (1:44.48); Gabriel Lópes (1:47.44); Diogo Carvalho (1:45.35)	7:02.19	Q
9	1	2	Lithuania	Danas Rapšys (1:40.95) CR; Deividas Margevičius (1:45.75); Andrius Šidlauskas (1:49.36); Tadas Duškinas (1:47.33)	7:03.39	R, NR
10	1	7	New Zealand	Bradlee Ashby (1:46.27); Daniel Hunter (1:46.08); Matthew Hyde (1:48.60); Wilrich Coetzee (1:47.20)	7:08.15	R
11	1	6	Chinese Taipei	Wang Hsing-hao (1:45.96); Wang Kuan-hung (1:46.95); Huang Yen-hsin (1:48.94); An Ting-yao (1:48.17)	7:10.02	
12	2	7	Bulgaria	Antani Ivanov (1:45.87); Yordan Yanchev (1:49.61); Kaloyan Bratanov (1:50.86); Svetlozar Nikolov (1:49.51)	7:15.85	NR
–	2	3	Japan	Fuyu Yoshida (1:46.15); Tomoya Takeuchi (1:45.62); Daiya Seto (1:44.56); Hiromasa Fujimori (1:46.32)	DSQ	

=== Final ===
The final was held on 14 December at 20:52.

Rank	Lane	Nation	Swimmers	Time	Notes
1st place, gold medalist(s)	7	Brazil	Luiz Altamir Melo (1:42.03); Fernando Scheffer (1:40.99); Leonardo Coelho Santos (1:42.81); Breno Correia (1:40.98)	6:46.81	WR
2nd place, silver medalist(s)	4	Russia	Martin Malyutin (1:42.34); Mikhail Vekovishchev (1:41.57); Ivan Girev (1:41.85); Aleksandr Krasnykh (1:41.08)	6:46.84	ER
3rd place, bronze medalist(s)	6	China	Ji Xinjie (1:42.67); Xu Jiayu (1:41.68); Sun Yang (1:41.25); Wang Shun (1:41.93)	6:47.53	AS
4	5	United States	Blake Pieroni (1:41.85); Ryan Held (1:43.05); Zach Harting (1:42.92); Zane Grothe (1:42.02)	6:49.84	
5	2	Australia	Alexander Graham (1:42.24); Jack Gerrard (1:44.18); Cameron McEvoy (1:43.74); Thomas Fraser-Holmes (1:42.89)	6:53.05	
6	3	Italy	Filippo Megli (1:42.62); Matteo Ciampi (1:43.59); Alessio Colonna (1:44.39); Mattia Zuin (1:45.07)	6:55.67	
7	8	Portugal	Miguel Nascimento (1:43.16); Alexis Santos (1:43.43); Gabriel Lópes (1:46.06); Diogo Carvalho (1:46.63)	6:59.28	NR
8	1	Sweden	Gustaf Dahlman (1:46.79); Christoffer Carlsen (1:42.53); Simon Sjödin (1:44.18); Adam Paulsson (1:45.85)	6:59.35	NR
