= Swimming at the 2020 European Aquatics Championships – Men's 4 × 200 metre freestyle relay =

Men's 4 × 200 metre freestyle relay at the 2020 European Aquatics Championships
- Venue: Danube Arena
- Dates: 19 May 2021
- Competitors: 66 from 15 nations
- Teams: 15
- Winning time: 7:03.48

Medalists
gold medal	Martin Malyutin; Aleksandr Shchegolev; Aleksandr Krasnykh; Mikhail Vekovishchev; Ivan Girev	Russia
silver medal	Thomas Dean; Matthew Richards; James Guy; Duncan Scott; Max Litchfield; Calum Jarvis	Great Britain
bronze medal	Stefano Ballo; Matteo Ciampi; Marco De Tullio; Stefano Di Cola; Manuel Frigo; Filippo Megli	Italy

The Men's 4 × 200 metre freestyle relay competition of the 2020 European Aquatics Championships was held on 19 May 2021.

== Records ==
Before the competition, the existing world, European and championship records were as follows.

	Team	Time	Location	Date
World record	United States	6:58.55	Rome	31 July 2009
European record	Russia	6:59.15	Rome	31 July 2009
Championship record	Great Britain	7:05.32	Glasgow	5 August 2018

The following new records were set during this competition.

Date	Event	Team	Time	Record
19 May	Final	Russia	7:03.48	CR

== Results ==
=== Heats ===
The heats were held at 11:26.

Rank	Heat	Lane	Nation	Swimmers	Time	Notes
1	1	4	Great Britain	Max Litchfield (1:47.70); Calum Jarvis (1:48.47); Matthew Richards (1:46.69); James Guy (1:45.72)	7:08.58	Q
2	2	2	Russia	Mikhail Vekovishchev (1:46.91); Aleksandr Krasnykh (1:47.07); Ivan Girev (1:48.17); Aleksandr Shchegolev (1:47.53)	7:09.68	Q
3	1	6	Italy	Manuel Frigo (1:49.46); Matteo Ciampi (1:46.85); Filippo Megli (1:47.07); Marco De Tullio (1:46.88)	7:10.26	Q
4	2	5	France	Jonathan Atsu (1:48.26); Enzo Tesic (1:46.87); Roman Fuchs (1:48.97); Jordan Pothain (1:46.34)	7:10.44	Q
5	1	3	Switzerland	Nils Liess (1:49.10); Antonio Djakovic (1:45.71); Roman Mityukov (1:48.49); Noè Ponti (1:47.85)	7:11.15	Q
6	1	5	Ireland	Finn McGeever (1:49.60); Jack McMillan (1:46.78); Gerry Quinn (1:48.70); Jordan Sloan (1:47.65)	7:12.73	Q, NR
7	2	7	Spain	César Castro (1:47.46); Moritz Berg (1:47.77); Miguel Durán (1:49.19); Mario Mollà (1:48.66)	7:13.08	Q
8	2	6	Belgium	Alexandre Marcourt (1:48.24); Lorenz Weiremans (1:49.57); Thomas Thijs (1:48.57); Sebastien De Meulemeester (1:46.81)	7:13.19	Q
9	2	8	Israel	Tomer Frankel (1:50.20); Denis Loktev (1:48.36); Daniel Namir (1:48.58); Gal Cohen Groumi (1:48.65)	7:15.79	
10	2	3	Hungary	Dominik Kozma (1:48.14); Gábor Zombori (1:50.96); Richárd Márton (1:49.54); Nándor Németh (1:47.41)	7:16.05	
11	2	4	Poland	Jakub Majerski (1:49.24); Bartosz Piszczorowicz (1:49.52); Jan Świtkowski (1:50.73); Jan Hołub (1:46.82)	7:16.31	
12	1	7	Serbia	Aleksa Bobar (1:51.25); Velimir Stjepanović (1:47.03); Vuk Čelić (1:51.32); Andrej Barna (1:48.30)	7:17.90	
13	1	1	Greece	Konstantinos Englezakis (1:47.57); Dimitrios Markos (1:47.24); Dimitrios Negris (1:50.78); Apostolos Papastamos (1:52.51)	7:18.10	
14	1	2	Turkey	Efe Turan (1:51.59); Doğa Çelik (1:52.68); Yiğit Aslan (1:51.92); Melikşah Düğen (1:51.33)	7:27.52	
15	2	1	Slovakia	Jakub Poliačik (1:54.31); Richard Nagy (1:53.50); Ádám Halás (1:58.15); Matej Duša (1:58.43)	7:44.39	

=== Final ===
The final was held at 19:50.

Rank	Lane	Nation	Swimmers	Time	Notes
1st place, gold medalist(s)	5	Russia	Martin Malyutin (1:45.15); Aleksandr Shchegolev (1:45.39); Aleksandr Krasnykh (1:46.52); Mikhail Vekovishchev (1:46.42)	7:03.48	CR
2nd place, silver medalist(s)	4	Great Britain	Thomas Dean (1:46.47); Matthew Richards (1:46.97); James Guy (1:45.88); Duncan Scott (1:45.29)	7:04.61	
3rd place, bronze medalist(s)	3	Italy	Stefano Ballo (1:47.30); Matteo Ciampi (1:46.17); Marco De Tullio (1:46.02); Stefano Di Cola (1:46.56)	7:06.05	
4	6	France	Jordan Pothain (1:46.91); Enzo Tesic (1:46.88); Mewen Tomac (1:46.96); Jonathan Atsu (1:46.49)	7:07.24	
5	7	Ireland	Jack McMillan (1:47.46); Jordan Sloan (1:47.81); Finn McGeever (1:48.65); Gerry Quinn (1:48.08)	7:12.00	NR
6	1	Spain	César Castro (1:47.13 NR); Moritz Berg (1:48.34); Mario Mollà (1:49.08); Miguel Durán (1:48.94)	7:13.49	
7	8	Belgium	Alexandre Marcourt (1:48.17); Sebastien De Meulemeester (1:47.57); Thomas Thijs (1:50.30); Lorenz Weiremans (1:50.35)	7:16.39	
	2	Switzerland	Antonio Djakovic (1:46.75); Nils Liess (1:45.90); Noè Ponti (1:57.23); Roman Mityukov (DSQ)	Disqualified	
