= Swimming at the 2018 European Aquatics Championships – Men's 4 × 200 metre freestyle relay =

Men's 4 × 200 metre freestyle relay at the 2018 European Aquatics Championships
- Venue: Tollcross International Swimming Centre
- Dates: 5 August
- Competitors: 58 from 13 nations
- Teams: 13
- Winning time: 7:05.32

Medalists
gold medal	Calum Jarvis; Duncan Scott; Thomas Dean; James Guy; Stephen Milne; Cameron Kurle	Great Britain
silver medal	Mikhail Vekovishchev; Martin Malyutin; Danila Izotov; Mikhail Dovgalyuk; Viacheslav Andrusenko	Russia
bronze medal	Alessio Proietti Colonna; Filippo Megli; Matteo Ciampi; Mattia Zuin; Stefano Di Cola	Italy

The Men's 4 × 200 metre freestyle relay competition of the 2018 European Aquatics Championships was held on 5 August 2018.

== Records ==
Before the competition, the existing world and championship records were as follows.

	Team	Time	Location	Date
World record	United States	6:58.55	Rome	31 July 2009
European record	Russia	6:59.15	Rome	31 July 2009
Championship record	Russia	7:06.71	Budapest	14 August 2010

The following new records were set during this competition.

Date	Event	Nation	Time	Record
5 August	Final	Great Britain	7:05.32	CR

== Results ==
=== Heats ===
The heats were started at 10:48.

Rank	Heat	Lane	Nation	Swimmers	Time	Notes
1	2	1	Russia	Martin Malyutin (1:47.54); Viacheslav Andrusenko (1:48.14); Danila Izotov (1:46.18); Mikhail Vekovishchev (1:47.14)	7:09.00	Q
2	1	2	Great Britain	Stephen Milne (1:48.64); Cameron Kurle (1:49.08); Thomas Dean (1:47.64); Calum Jarvis (1:46.55)	7:11.91	Q
3	1	5	Italy	Stefano Di Cola (1:49.58); Matteo Ciampi (1:47.11); Alessio Proietti Colonna (1:47.76); Mattia Zuin (1:48.01)	7:12.46	Q
4	1	1	Germany	Poul Zellmann (1:48.05); Marius Zobel (1:49.83); Henning Mühlleitner (1:48.03); Jacob Heidtmann (1:46.84)	7:12.75	Q
5	2	5	Netherlands	Kyle Stolk (1:48.71); Stan Pijnenburg (1:48.86); Ferry Weertman (1:48.96); Maarten Brzoskowski (1:48.33)	7:14.86	Q
6	1	6	France	Alexandre Derache (1:49.07); Jordan Pothain (1:48.50); Roman Fuchs (1:48.52); Lorys Bourelly (1:49.17)	7:15.26	Q
7	2	7	Sweden	Victor Johansson (1:48.67); Robin Hanson (1:48.45); Gustaf Dalman (1:49.55); Adam Paulsson (1:48.88)	7:15.55	Q
8	2	6	Spain	César Castro (1:48.35); Alex Ramos (1:48.76); Miguel Durán (1:49.91); Marc Sánchez (1:48.63)	7:15.65	Q
9	2	3	Hungary	Balázs Holló (1:50.10); Ádám Telegdy (1:48.93); Benjámin Grátz (1:50.21); Bence Biczó (1:48.95)	7:18.19	
10	1	3	Belgium	Sebastien De Meulemeester (1:49.15); Alexandre Marcourt (1:51.25); Thomas Thijs (1:49.67); Lorenz Weiremans (1:48.68)	7:18.75	
11	1	7	Israel	Daniel Namir (1:50.19); Denis Loktev (1:48.83); David Gamburg (1:50.91); Yonatan Batsha (1:52.78)	7:22.71	
12	2	4	Lithuania	Danas Rapšys (1:49.36); Simonas Bilis (1:50.31); Tomas Sungaila (1:52.50); Povilas Strazdas (1:51.34)	7:23.51	
	1	4	Poland	Jan Hołub (1:49.24); Filip Zaborowski (1:49.17); Jakub Kraska; Kacper Majchrzak	DSQ	

=== Final ===
The final was held at 18:52.

Rank	Lane	Nation	Swimmers	Time	Notes
1st place, gold medalist(s)	3	Great Britain	Calum Jarvis (1:47.17); Duncan Scott (1:45.48); Thomas Dean (1:47.07); James Guy (1:45.60)	7:05.32	CR
2nd place, silver medalist(s)	4	Russia	Mikhail Vekovishchev (1:46.78); Martin Malyutin (1:46.84); Danila Izotov (1:46.86); Mikhail Dovgalyuk (1:46.18)	7:06.66	
3rd place, bronze medalist(s)	5	Italy	Alessio Proietti Colonna (1:48.20); Filippo Megli (1:45.44); Matteo Ciampi (1:46.49); Mattia Zuin (1:47.45)	7:07.58	
4	6	Germany	Damian Wierling (1:48.86); Henning Mühlleitner (1:46.94); Poul Zellmann (1:47.57); Jacob Heidtmann (1:45.94)	7:09.31	
5	8	Spain	César Castro (1:47.85); Alex Ramos (1:48.14); Marc Sánchez (1:48.63); Miguel Durán (1:48.45)	7:13.07	
6	7	France	Jordan Pothain (1:48.94); Alexandre Derache (1:48.32); Roman Fuchs (1:47.88); Jonathan Atsu (1:47.98)	7:13.12	
7	2	Netherlands	Kyle Stolk (1:48.46); Ferry Weertman (1:48.75); Stan Pijnenburg (1:48.16); Maarten Brzoskowski (1:48.09)	7:13.46	
8	1	Sweden	Victor Johansson (1:48.68); Robin Hanson (1:48.56); Gustaf Dalman (1:47.84); Adam Paulsson (1:48.95)	7:14.03	
