= Swimming at the 2017 World Aquatics Championships – Men's 4 × 200 metre freestyle relay =

Men's 4 × 200 metre freestyle relay at the 2017 World Aquatics Championships
- Venue: Danube Arena
- Location: Budapest, Hungary
- Dates: 28 July (heats and final)
- Competitors: 74 from 17 nations
- Teams: 17
- Winning time: 7:01.70

Medalists
gold medal	Stephen Milne; Nicholas Grainger; Duncan Scott; James Guy; Calum Jarvis	Great Britain
silver medal	Mikhail Dovgalyuk; Mikhail Vekovishchev; Danila Izotov; Aleksandr Krasnykh; Nikita Lobintsev	Russia
bronze medal	Blake Pieroni; Townley Haas; Jack Conger; Zane Grothe; Conor Dwyer; Clark Smith; Jay Litherland	United States

The Men's 4 × 200 metre freestyle relay competition at the 2017 World Championships was held on 28 July 2017. .

== Records ==
Prior to the competition, the existing world and championship records were as follows.

World record	United States	6:58.55	Rome, Italy	31 July 2009
Competition record	United States	6:58.55	Rome, Italy	31 July 2009

== Results ==
=== Heats ===
The heats were held on 28 July at 10:47.

Rank	Heat	Lane	Nation	Swimmers	Time	Notes
1	1	5	Australia	Clyde Lewis (1:46.79); David McKeon (1:46.72); Alexander Graham (1:46.52); Jack Cartwright (1:45.65)	7:05.68	Q
2	1	4	Great Britain	Stephen Milne (1:46.78); Nicholas Grainger (1:46.19); Calum Jarvis (1:46.32); Duncan Scott (1:46.50)	7:05.79	Q
3	2	3	Russia	Mikhail Vekovishchev (1:46.78); Danila Izotov (1:45.91); Nikita Lobintsev (1:48.51); Mikhail Dovgalyuk (1:46.01)	7:07.21	Q
4	2	6	Netherlands	Kyle Stolk (1:47.45); Ferry Weertman (1:47.42); Stan Pijnenburg (1:47.56); Maarten Brzoskowski (1:46.79)	7:09.22	Q
5	1	6	Italy	Filippo Megli (1:47.59); Filippo Magnini (1:47.35); Luca Dotto (1:47.64); Gabriele Detti (1:46.95)	7:09.53	Q
6	2	5	Japan	Kosuke Hagino (1:47.51); Naito Ehara (1:46.40); Tsubasa Amai (1:48.28); Katsuhiro Matsumoto (1:47.47)	7:09.66	Q
7	2	4	United States	Conor Dwyer (1:47.77); Clark Smith (1:47.57); Jay Litherland (1:47.48); Zane Grothe (1:46.96)	7:09.78	Q
8	1	1	Poland	Kacper Majchrzak (1:46.74); Filip Zaborowski (1:48.42); Antoni Kałużyński (1:48.52); Jan Świtkowski (1:46.85)	7:10.53	Q
9	1	3	Germany	Philip Heintz (1:48.65); Poul Zellmann (1:47.32); Clemens Rapp (1:48.20); Jacob Heidtmann (1:46.86)	7:11.03	
10	2	2	Hungary	Nándor Németh (1:47.84); Benjámin Grátz (1:49.43); Ádám Telegdy (1:49.02); Dominik Kozma (1:44.81)	7:11.10	
11	2	7	China	Wang Shun (1:48.56); Ji Xinjie (1:49.08); Ma Tianchi (1:49.40); Qian Zhiyong (1:48.58)	7:15.62	
12	1	2	Denmark	Anders Lie (1:47.74); Daniel Skaaning (1:47.40); Marcus Krøyer (1:49.85); Sebastian Ovesen (1:50.96)	7:15.95	
13	2	1	Egypt	Marwan El-Kamash (1:48.80); Mohamed Samy (1:48.27); Ahmed Akram (1:48.89); Marwan El-Amrawy (1:50.99)	7:16.95	NR
14	1	7	Canada	Jeremy Bagshaw (1:49.03); Markus Thormeyer (1:50.46); Yuri Kisil (1:49.23); Carson Olafson (1:48.64)	7:17.36	
15	2	0	Serbia	Velimir Stjepanović (1:47.87); Uroš Nikolić (1:51.89); Stefan Šorak (1:49.95); Ivan Lenđer (1:49.47)	7:18.68	
16	1	8	Israel	Denis Loktev (1:50.07); Liran Konovalov (1:50.11); Tomer Frankel (1:49.80); Daniel Namir (1:49.34)	7:19.32	
17	2	8	Greece	Andreas Vazaios (1:47.48 NR); Dimitrios Dimitriou (1:50.56); Dimitrios Negris (1:51.25); Christos Katranzis (1:51.26)	7:20.55	

=== Final ===
The final was held on 28 July at 19:12.

Rank	Lane	Nation	Swimmers	Time	Notes
1st place, gold medalist(s)	5	Great Britain	Stephen Milne (1:47.25); Nicholas Grainger (1:46.05); Duncan Scott (1:44.60); James Guy (1:43.80)	7:01.70	NR
2nd place, silver medalist(s)	3	Russia	Mikhail Dovgalyuk (1:46.00); Mikhail Vekovishchev (1:45.91); Danila Izotov (1:45.97); Aleksandr Krasnykh (1:44.80)	7:02.68	
3rd place, bronze medalist(s)	1	United States	Blake Pieroni (1:46.33); Townley Haas (1:44.58); Jack Conger (1:45.37); Zane Grothe (1:46.90)	7:03.18	
4	4	Australia	Clyde Lewis (1:46.81); Mack Horton (1:46.25); Alexander Graham (1:46.59); Jack Cartwright (1:46.33)	7:05.98	
5	7	Japan	Kosuke Hagino (1:47.32); Naito Ehara (1:46.60); Tsubasa Amai (1:47.30); Katsuhiro Matsumoto (1:46.46)	7:07.68	
6	2	Italy	Filippo Megli (1:47.34); Gabriele Detti (1:46.08); Filippo Magnini (1:49.09); Luca Dotto (1:46.93)	7:09.44	
7	8	Poland	Kacper Majchrzak (1:46.46); Filip Zaborowski (1:47.58); Antoni Kałużyński (1:48.12); Jan Świtkowski (1:47.46)	7:09.62	
8	6	Netherlands	Kyle Stolk (1:47.73); Ferry Weertman (1:48.23); Stan Pijnenburg (1:47.60); Maarten Brzoskowski (1:49.20)	7:12.76	
