= Swimming at the 2018 Mediterranean Games – Men's 4 × 200 metre freestyle relay =

Men's 4 × 200 metre freestyle relay at the 2018 Mediterranean Games
- Venue: Campclar Aquatic Center
- Location: Tarragona, Spain
- Dates: 24 June
- Competitors: 24 from 6 nations
- Winning time: 7:11.66

Medalists
gold medal	Matteo Ciampi; Stefano Di Cola; Filippo Megli; Mattia Zuin	Italy
silver medal	Velimir Stjepanović; Aleksa Bobar; Andrej Barna; Uroš Nikolić	Serbia
bronze medal	Marc Sánchez; Moritz Berg; Hugo González; Miguel Durán	Spain

The men's 4 × 200 metre freestyle relay event at the 2018 Mediterranean Games was held on 24 June 2018 at the Campclar Aquatic Center.

== Records ==
Prior to this competition, the existing world and Mediterranean Games records were as follows:

World record	United States	6:58.55	Rome, Italy	31 July 2009
Mediterranean Games record	Italy	7:09.44	Pescara, Italy	29 June 2009

== Results ==
The final was held at 19:12.

Rank	Lane	Nation	Swimmers	Time	Notes
1st place, gold medalist(s)	1	Italy	Matteo Ciampi (1:48.70); Stefano Di Cola (1:48.08); Filippo Megli (1:46.80); Mattia Zuin (1:48.08)	7:11.66	
2nd place, silver medalist(s)	2	Serbia	Velimir Stjepanović (1:46.81); Aleksa Bobar (1:50.79); Andrej Barna (1:50.16); Uroš Nikolić (1:50.81)	7:18.57	
3rd place, bronze medalist(s)	5	Spain	Marc Sánchez (1:50.26); Moritz Berg (1:49.10); Hugo González (1:49.92); Miguel Durán (1:51.13)	7:20.41	
4	6	Greece	Andreas Vazaios (1:49.55); Dimitrios Dimitriou (1:50.03); Georgios Spanoudakis (1:52.61); Dimitrios Negris (1:52.19)	7:24.38	
5	4	Portugal	Miguel Nascimento (1:50.08); Gabriel Lópes (1:52.56); Tomás Veloso (1:53.44); Alexis Santos (1:51.31)	7:27.39	
6	7	Turkey	Erge Can Gezmiş (1:51.91); Doğa Çelik (1:54.93); Efe Turan (1:51.88); Kemal Arda Gürdal (1:55.52)	7:34.24	
	3	Cyprus		DNS	
