= Duncan Scott (swimmer) =

Scottish swimmer (born 1997)

Duncan Scott OBE
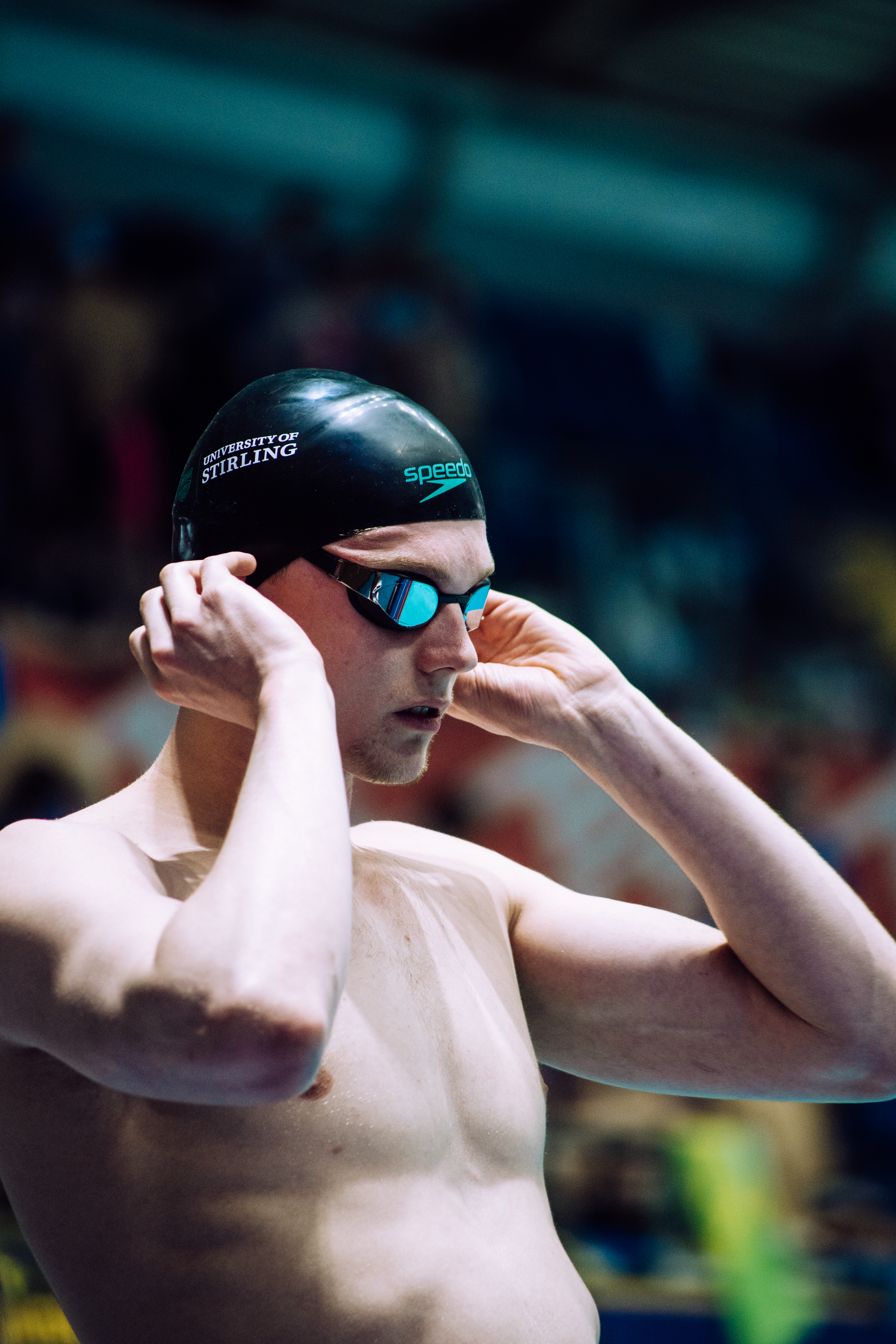
- Scott at the BUCS Nationals 2020

Personal information
- Full name: Duncan William MacNaughton Scott
- Nicknames: Slam, Dunks
- National team: Great Britain; Scotland
- Born: 6 May 1997 (age 29) Glasgow, Scotland
- Height: 1.90 m (6 ft 3 in)
- Weight: 81 kg (179 lb)

Sport
- Sport: Swimming
- Strokes: Butterfly, Freestyle, Medley
- Club: University of Stirling
- Coach: Ben Higson
Medal record
Event	1st	2nd	3rd
Olympic Games	2	6	0
World Championships (LC)	5	2	3
European Championships (LC)	8	4	0
European Championships (SC)	3	2	2
Commonwealth Games	4	2	9
Total	22	16	14
Men's swimming
Representing Great Britain
Olympic Games
Gold medal – first place	2020 Tokyo	4×200 m freestyle
Gold medal – first place	2024 Paris	4×200 m freestyle
Silver medal – second place	2016 Rio de Janeiro	4×200 m freestyle
Silver medal – second place	2016 Rio de Janeiro	4×100 m medley
Silver medal – second place	2020 Tokyo	200 m freestyle
Silver medal – second place	2020 Tokyo	200 m medley
Silver medal – second place	2020 Tokyo	4×100 m medley
Silver medal – second place	2024 Paris	200 m medley
World Championships (LC)
Gold medal – first place	2015 Kazan	4×200 m freestyle
Gold medal – first place	2017 Budapest	4×200 m freestyle
Gold medal – first place	2019 Gwangju	4×100 m medley
Gold medal – first place	2023 Fukuoka	4×200 m freestyle
Gold medal – first place	2025 Singapore	4×200 m freestyle
Silver medal – second place	2017 Budapest	4×100 m medley
Silver medal – second place	2023 Fukuoka	200 m medley
Bronze medal – third place	2019 Gwangju	200 m freestyle
Bronze medal – third place	2023 Fukuoka	4×100 m mixed freestyle
Bronze medal – third place	2024 Doha	4×100 m mixed medley
European Championships (LC)
Gold medal – first place	2016 London	4×100 m medley
Gold medal – first place	2016 London	4×100 m mixed medley
Gold medal – first place	2018 Glasgow	200 m freestyle
Gold medal – first place	2018 Glasgow	4×200 m freestyle
Gold medal – first place	2018 Glasgow	4×100 m medley
Gold medal – first place	2020 Budapest	4×100 m medley
Gold medal – first place	2020 Budapest	4×100 m mixed freestyle
Gold medal – first place	2026 Paris	4×200 m freestyle
Silver medal – second place	2018 Glasgow	100 m freestyle
Silver medal – second place	2020 Budapest	200 m freestyle
Silver medal – second place	2020 Budapest	4×100 m freestyle
Silver medal – second place	2020 Budapest	4×200 m freestyle
European Championships (SC)
Gold medal – first place	2025 Lublin	200 m freestyle
Gold medal – first place	2023 Otopeni	200 m medley
Gold medal – first place	2023 Otopeni	4 x 50 m freestyle relay
Silver medal – second place	2019 Glasgow	200 m freestyle
Silver medal – second place	2019 Glasgow	4x50 m mixed freestyle
Bronze medal – third place	2017 Copenhagen	100 m freestyle
Bronze medal – third place	2017 Copenhagen	200 m freestyle
European Games
Gold medal – first place	2015 Baku (Note: Swimming programme limited to juniors - doubled up as the 2015 European Junior Swimming Championships)	100 m freestyle
Gold medal – first place	2015 Baku	200 m freestyle
Gold medal – first place	2015 Baku	4×100 m freestyle
Silver medal – second place	2015 Baku	4×200 m freestyle
Silver medal – second place	2015 Baku	4×100 m medley
Silver medal – second place	2015 Baku	4×100 m mixed freestyle
Youth Olympic Games
Gold medal – first place	2014 Nanjing	4 x 100 m freestyle relay
European Youth Olympic Festival
Gold medal – first place	2013 Utrecht	200 m medley
Silver medal – second place	2013 Utrecht	200 m freestyle
Silver medal – second place	2013 Utrecht	4 x 100 m freestyle relay
Bronze medal – third place	2013 Utrecht	4 x 100 m freestyle mixed relay
European Junior Championships
Gold medal – first place	2014 Dordrecht	200 m medley
Gold medal – first place	2014 Dordrecht	4 x 100 m freestyle relay
Bronze medal – third place	2014 Dordrecht	4 x 200 m freestyle relay
Representing Scotland
Commonwealth Games
Gold medal – first place	2018 Gold Coast	100 m freestyle
Gold medal – first place	2022 Birmingham	200 m freestyle
Gold medal – first place	2022 Birmingham	200 m medley
Gold medal – first place	2026 Glasgow	200 m medley
Silver medal – second place	2014 Glasgow	4×200 m freestyle
Silver medal – second place	2018 Gold Coast	200 m medley
Bronze medal – third place	2018 Gold Coast	200 m freestyle
Bronze medal – third place	2018 Gold Coast	200 m butterfly
Bronze medal – third place	2018 Gold Coast	4×100 m freestyle
Bronze medal – third place	2018 Gold Coast	4×200 m freestyle
Bronze medal – third place	2022 Birmingham	400 m medley
Bronze medal – third place	2022 Birmingham	100 m freestyle
Bronze medal – third place	2022 Birmingham	4×200 m freestyle
Bronze medal – third place	2022 Birmingham	4×100 m medley
Bronze medal – third place	2026 Glasgow	4×100 m mixed medley

Duncan William MacNaughton Scott (born 6 May 1997) is a Scottish swimmer representing Great Britain at the FINA World Aquatics Championships, LEN European Aquatics Championships, European Games and the Olympic Games, and Scotland at the Commonwealth Games. Scott made history after winning four medals - more than any other British athlete at a single Olympic Games - in Tokyo 2020, simultaneously becoming Great Britain's most decorated swimmer in Olympic history. With an additional gold and silver medal in Paris 2024 bringing his total to eight, Scott became Scotland's most-decorated Olympian (surpassing Chris Hoy), and is currently tied with Bradley Wiggins as the second most-decorated Olympian in British history. Scott is the only athlete in the top three to still be actively competing, and the only member of the top four (Hoy, Scott, Wiggins and Jason Kenny) who is not a track cyclist.

An all-rounder in the pool, Scott has swum internationally in 100 and 200 metres freestyle and butterfly, and 200 metres individual medley. He has won gold at the Olympics, three golds at the World Championships in 4 x 200 metre freestyle relay, a World Championship gold in the men's 4 x 100 metre medley relay, as well as silvers at the World Championships and Olympics in freestyle and medley relay. Individually, Scott was the 100 metre freestyle champion at the 2015 European Games and 2018 Commonwealth Games, and the 200 metre freestyle champion at the same European Games and the 2018 European Aquatics Championships. He is an Olympic silver medalist in the individual 200 metres freestyle and 200 metres individual medley, and a World silver medalist in the 200 metres individual medley.

Winning three gold medals in the (100 m and 200 m freestyle, and 4 × 100 m freestyle relay) at the 2015 European Games, he was the most successful British athlete at the Games. A month later, he formed part of the Great Britain squad that won the gold medal at the 2015 World Aquatics Championships in the men's 4 x 200 metre freestyle relay as the 4th leg swimmer in the heat. In 2016, he was a member of the Great Britain team that won silver in the final of the same event at the Olympic Games as well as the men's 4 x 100 metre medley relay. The same team also won the 4 x 100 metre medley relay silver in the 2017 World Championships. A noted relay swimmer, Scott broke the individual British 200 metre freestyle record leading off in the men's 4 x 200 metre relay, before anchoring the team that won gold in 4 x 100 metre medley relay at the 2019 World Championships. His anchor splits in a number of global relays are among the fastest in history - as of 2024, Scott has both the second fastest 100 metre freestyle anchor leg in history, and the third fastest 200 metre freestyle anchor leg.

== Early life ==
Scott grew up in Alloa, moving to Strathallan School on a sport scholarship at the beginning of secondary. He trained daily throughout his high school years.

== Career ==
Scott came to public attention when he won eight gold medals at the 2013 Scottish Age Group Championships in Edinburgh. Later that year he competed at the 2013 European Youth Summer Olympic Festival taking gold in the 200 m medley, silvers in the (400 m medley, 4 × 100 m mixed freestyle) and bronze in the 4 × 100 m freestyle.

In July 2014, at the 2014 European Junior Championships, Scott won a gold medal in the (200 m individual medley, 4 × 100 m freestyle) and bronze in the 4 × 200 m freestyle. A few weeks later he won a silver medal in the 4 × 200 m freestyle relay with Scotland at the 2014 Commonwealth Games. He then competed at the 2014 Youth Olympics in Nanjing taking gold in the 4 × 100 m freestyle (with Luke Greenbank, Miles Munro, and Martyn Walton).

At the inaugural 2015 European Games in Baku (a junior event for swimmers), he won three gold medals in the (100 m freestyle, 200 m freestyle and 4 × 100 m freestyle relay) and three silver medals in the 4 × 200 m freestyle, 4 × 100 m mixed freestyle, and 4 × 100 m medley (with Greenbank, Charlie Attwood, and Walton).

=== 2016 ===
In the 2016 Rio Olympics, he won a silver in the 4 × 200 m freestyle relay with Stephen Milne, James Guy, and Dan Wallace. He also won another silver in the 4 × 100 m medley relay with Chris Walker-Hebborn, James Guy and Adam Peaty. He was placed 5th in the final of the individual men's 100 metres freestyle.

=== 2017 ===
In the 2017 World Aquatics Championships. He won gold in the 4 × 200 m freestyle with James Guy, Stephen Milne and Nick Grainger in a time of seven minutes 1.70 seconds. He won a further silver in the 4 × 100 m medley relay at the World Championship with same Olympic line-up of Walker-Hebborn, Guy and Peaty.

=== 2018 ===
At the 2018 Commonwealth Games, Scott won the gold medal in the 100 metre freestyle in a time of 48.02 seconds. He also won four bronze medals at the Games: in the 200 metre butterfly, 200 metre freestyle, 4 × 100 metre freestyle relay, and 4 × 200 metre freestyle relay, and became the first Scottish athlete to win five medals a single Commonwealth Games. He added a sixth medal when he won the silver medal in the 200 metre individual medley.

At the 2018 European Championships, Scott won a silver in the 100 metre freestyle. Later the same day he won gold as part of the relay team in the 4 × 200 metre freestyle relay with Calum Jarvis, Thomas Dean and James Guy. He also won gold in the 200 metre freestyle, despite only having just made the final in 8th place. He added a third gold in the final day of the championships, winning the men's 4 × 100 metre medley relay as part of the British team with Adam Peaty, James Guy and Nicholas Pyle.

On 13 September he was named Scottish Sportsperson of the Year at the Team Scotland Scottish Sports Awards.

=== 2019 ===
At the 2019 World Aquatics Championships held in Gwangju, South Korea, Scott came joint fourth in the 200 m freestyle, but the first-placed finisher Danas Rapšys was disqualified for a false start, and Scott was awarded a bronze medal together with Martin Malyutin. After the medal ceremony, Scott refused to shake hands and take pictures with the gold medallist Sun Yang, who had previously been banned for a trimetazidine drug offence in 2014 for three months and was involved in an ongoing doping case controversy. This transpired following Australian Mack Horton's refusal to share a podium with Sun at the medal ceremony when the Chinese national anthem was played. Both Sun and Scott were given official warnings from FINA; Scott was subjected to death threats from Sun's fans on social media.

In the lead-off leg in the men's 4 × 200 m freestyle relay final, Scott broke the British national record with a time of 1:44:91; the team finished fifth in the race. In the men's 4 × 100 metre medley relay together with Adam Peaty, James Guy and Luke Greenbank, he swam the anchor leg in 46.14 seconds, the second fastest freestyle relay split of all time, and the fastest in textile. He managed to overcome a 1.11 second deficit to finish in front of the United States team, thereby winning Britain's first gold medal in the event in the World Championships in a European record time of three minutes, 28.10 seconds.

=== 2020 ===
Scott competed for London Roar during the 2020 International Swim League once again and during the tournament in Budapest he set a new British Record in the 200 Individual Medley and broke the British Record for the 200m freestyle twice, a week apart from each other.

Based on his 2019 individual world championship result, Scott was pre-selected for the postponed 2020 Tokyo Olympics.

=== 2021 ===
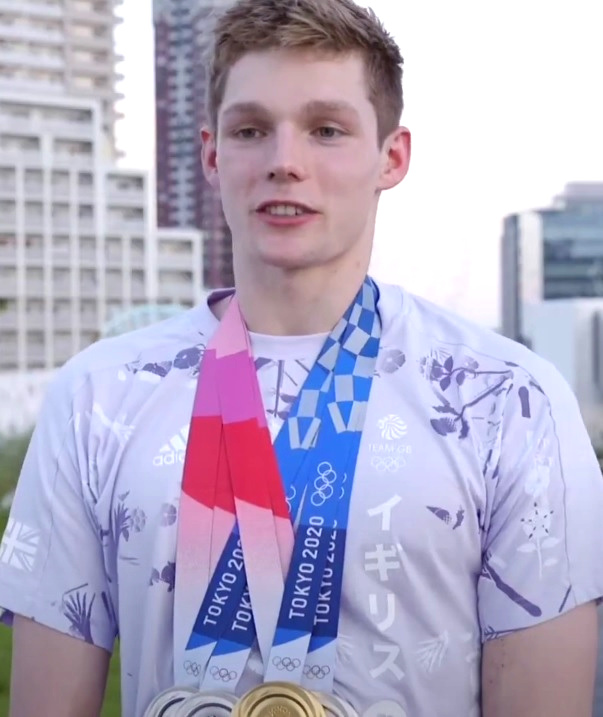
Scott and his haul of medals from the Tokyo Olympics

At the 2021 British Swimming Olympic trials, Scott broke the British record in the 200m individual medley with a time of 1:55.90. In May 2021, Scott won a silver medal in 200m freestyle at the European Championships. He also won two gold medals in the men's 4 x 100 m medley and mixed 4 × 100 metre freestyle relays, as well as two silvers in the men's 4 × 100 metre freestyle and 4 × 200 metre freestyle relays.

At the 2021 British Championships, Scott set a new British Record of 1:55:90 in the 200IM, then went onto equal his existing British Record in the 100m Freestyle and finished off with a new British Record in the 200m Freestyle with a time of 1:44:47.

A month later in May 2021, the LEN European Aquatics Championships saw Scott win Gold in the mixed 4×100 free relay and men’s 4×100 medley relay; He also achieved Silver medals in the 200m freestyle, men’s 4x 100 freestyle relay and men’s 4×200 freestyle relay.

At the delayed Tokyo 2020 Olympics Scott made history with his medals.

He won gold in the men’s 4 x 200m freestyle relay and silver in the men’s medley relay which set a new European record of 3:27.51. He also took silver in the individual 200m freestyle and 200 IM where he set a new British Record of 1:55.28. These achievements made him Great Britain’s most decorated athlete in any sport at one Olympic Games and Great Britain’s most decorated Olympic swimmer ever.

Scott won silver in 200m freestyle, finishing 0.04 seconds behind the winner and teammate, Tom Dean. He followed it up with a gold as part of the 4×200m freestyle relay team with Tom Dean, James Guy, and Matt Richards, winning it in a European record of 6 minutes 58.58 seconds. He also claimed a silver in men's 200 metre individual medley, and another in the 4 × 100 metre medley relay with Luke Greenbank, Adam Peaty, and James Guy, making him the first British athlete to win four medals in a single Games leading to calls for him to be nominated for a knighthood.

In the 2021 International Swimming League, Scott won match most valuable player honours for the fifteenth match of the overall season, which was the fourth match of the playoffs season, narrowly winning top honours over Ryan Murphy of LA Current by 4.0 points.

=== 2022 ===
At the 2022 British Swimming Championships in April, Scott won the 400 metre individual medley with a Commonwealth record, British record, 2022 World Aquatics Championships and 2022 Commonwealth Games qualifying time of 4:09.18. On 2 May, he was officially nominated by Scottish Swimming to be a member of Team Scotland for the 2022 Commonwealth Games. He withdrew from the 2022 World Championships in advance of the start of competition due to training difficulties leading up to the start of the Championships in June. In mid-July, approximately a week before the start of swimming competition at the 2022 Commonwealth Games, he withdrew from the 2022 European Aquatics Championships.

2022 Commonwealth Games

2022 Commonwealth Games
Gold medal – first place	200 m freestyle	1:45.02
Gold medal – first place	200 m individual medley	1:56.88 (GR)
Bronze medal – third place	400 m individual medley	4:11.27
Bronze medal – third place	100 m freestyle	48.27
Bronze medal – third place	4×200 m freestyle	7:09.33
Bronze medal – third place	4×100 m medley	3:35.11 (NR)

Once again Scott made history at the Birmingham 2022 Commonwealth Games. He amassed 2 gold medals in his signature 200m freestyle and 200m IM in addition to 4 bronze medals, making him Scotland’s most decorated athlete ever in the Commonwealth Games.

On the second day of swimming competition at the 2022 Commonwealth Games, held in Birmingham, England in July and August, Scott swam a 1:47.16 in the preliminaries of the 200 metre freestyle, qualifying for the final ranking second. Later in the morning, he ranked seventh in the preliminaries of the 400 metre individual medley, swimming a time of 4:20.92 to qualify for the final. In the final of the 200 metre freestyle, he won the gold medal with a time of 1:45.02. He followed his gold medal up with a bronze medal in the 400 metre individual medley with a time of 4:11.27. The following day, Scott ranked third in the preliminaries of the 200 metre butterfly and advanced to the final with his time of 1:57.48. In his second event of the morning, the 100 metre freestyle, he qualified for the semifinals. For the evening finals session, he started off with a fifth-place finish in the 200 metre butterfly in a time of 1:56.89. Less than an hour later, he ranked sixth in the semifinals of the 100 metre freestyle with a 48.78 and qualified for the final.

In the final of the 100 metre freestyle on day four, Scott finished in a time of 48.27 seconds and won the bronze medal. Later in the session, he won a bronze medal in the 4×200 metre freestyle relay, splitting a 1:44.48 for the fourth leg of the relay to help finish in 7:09.33. His relay bronze medal marked his eleventh total medal at the Commonwealth Games and he became the most decorated Scottish competitor across all Commonwealth Games, breaking the former record of ten total medals set by shooter Alister Allan in 1994. Two days later, on the sixth and final day, he qualified for the final of the 200 metre individual medley along with fellow Scotsman Mark Szaranek, ranking third with a time of 2:00.41. In the final, he won the gold medal with a Games record time of 1:56.88. For his final event of the Games, he split a 51.74 for the butterfly leg of the 4×100 metre medley relay in the final to help win the bronze medal with a Scottish record time of 3:35.11.

2022 Swimming World Cup At his first FINA Swimming World Cup, the 2022 FINA Swimming World Cup stop held in November in Indianapolis, United States, Scott placed eighth in the 400 metre freestyle with a 3:45.35 on day one, twelfth in the 200 metre individual medley with a time of 1:58.50 on day two, tenth in the 400 metre individual medley on day three with a 4:12.98, and fifteenth in the 200 metre freestyle with a 1:44.80, also on day three.

=== 2024 ===
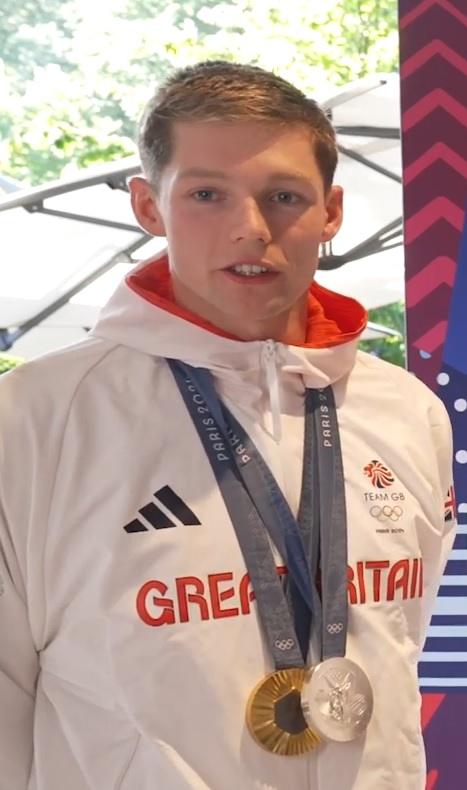
Scott won a gold and a silver at the 2024 Olympics

Scott won the 200 metres medley at the 2024 Aquatics GB Swimming Championships sealing his place at the 2024 Summer Olympics. At the Olympics he came in 4th in the 200 metre freestyle event with a time of 1:44.87. He won silver medal in the 200 metres individual medley event with a time of 1:55.31. Scott was in the final of the Men's 4 × 200 metre freestyle relay together with James Guy, Tom Dean, and Matt Richards, the same four quartet who won in the same event at the Tokyo Olympics. They won the relay with a time of six minutes and 59.43 seconds, and became the first team to have successfully defended an Olympic swimming relay title with the same four swimmers. They are also the first British team to have defended an Olympic relay title in swimming or athletics. This was also Scott's seventh Olympic medal, which made him Britain's 3rd most decorated Olympian.

=== 2025 ===
In 2025, Scott successfully defended his 200 metres medley title and won the 200 metres butterfly title at the 2025 Aquatics GB Swimming Championships, which sealed a qualification place for the 2025 World Aquatics Championships in Singapore. On the final day of competition, Scott won the 200 metres freestyle title, in an unprecedented dead heat with James Guy. Subsequently at the World Championships, he won the gold medal as part of the 4x200 metres freestyle team, alongside Matt Richards, James Guy and Jack McMillan and reached the final of the 200 metres medley. In November 2025, Scott was the first Scottish swimmer selected for the 2026 Commonwealth Games in Glasgow.

=== 2026 ===
In April 2026, Scott, representing the University of Stirling, won the 200m mens butterfly title in 1:54:97 at the British Swimming Championships, held 14-19 April at Queen Elizabeth Olympic Pack in London. Scott also won the 200IM in 1:55:28 and finished third, after James Guy and Matt Richards in the 200 freestyle at the same event. After the Championships Duncan Scott joined Adam Peaty's AP Race team to deliver Individual Medley and Freestyle Clinics in England and Scotland for the first time.

== Awards ==
Scott was appointed Member of the Order of the British Empire (MBE) in the 2022 New Year Honours and Officer of the Order of the British Empire (OBE) in the 2025 New Year Honours, both for services to swimming.

== International championships ==
=== Long course metres (50 m pool) ===
Meet	Individual events						Relay events				
Meet	50 free	100 free	200 free	200 fly	200 medley	400 medley	4×100 free	4×200 free	4×100 medley	4×100 mixed free	4×100 mixed medley
Junior level
EYOF 2013					1st place, gold medalist(s)	2nd place, silver medalist(s)	3rd place, bronze medalist(s)	—N/a		2nd place, silver medalist(s)	
EJC 2014			4th		1st place, gold medalist(s)		1st place, gold medalist(s)	3rd place, bronze medalist(s)			
YOG 2014	8th	6th	4th		9th		1st place, gold medalist(s)	—N/a		6th	6th
EG 2015		1st place, gold medalist(s)	1st place, gold medalist(s)				1st place, gold medalist(s)	2nd place, silver medalist(s)	2nd place, silver medalist(s)	2nd place, silver medalist(s)	
Senior level
CG 2014							4th	2nd place, silver medalist(s)		—N/a	—N/a
WC 2015							10th	(gold) ^{[a]}			
EC 2016		13th	30th		DNS		7th	6th	1st place, gold medalist(s)		(gold) ^{[a]}
OG 2016		5th						2nd place, silver medalist(s)	2nd place, silver medalist(s)	—N/a	—N/a
WC 2017		5th	4th					1st place, gold medalist(s)	2nd place, silver medalist(s)		
CG 2018		1st place, gold medalist(s)	3rd place, bronze medalist(s)	3rd place, bronze medalist(s)	2nd place, silver medalist(s)		3rd place, bronze medalist(s)	3rd place, bronze medalist(s)	4th	—N/a	—N/a
EC 2018		2nd place, silver medalist(s)	1st place, gold medalist(s)		3rd^{[a]}			1st place, gold medalist(s)	1st place, gold medalist(s)		
WC 2019		DNS	3rd place, bronze medalist(s)		5th		5th	5th	1st place, gold medalist(s)		
EC 2020		DNS	2nd place, silver medalist(s)		6th		2nd place, silver medalist(s)	2nd place, silver medalist(s)	1st place, gold medalist(s)	1st place, gold medalist(s)	
OG 2020			2nd place, silver medalist(s)		2nd place, silver medalist(s)			1st place, gold medalist(s)	2nd place, silver medalist(s)	—N/a	
CG 2022		3rd place, bronze medalist(s)	1st place, gold medalist(s)	5th	1st place, gold medalist(s)	3rd place, bronze medalist(s)		3rd place, bronze medalist(s)	3rd place, bronze medalist(s)		
WC 2023					2nd place, silver medalist(s)		DSQ	1st place, gold medalist(s)		3rd place, bronze medalist(s)	
WC 2024			6th		6th		4th	4th			(bronze) ^{[a]}
OG 2024			4th		2nd place, silver medalist(s)		5th	1st place, gold medalist(s)	4th		7th
WC 2025					4th		4th	1st place, gold medalist(s)	6th		

^{a} Scott swam only in the prelims heats.

=== Short course metres (25 m pool) ===
Meet	100 free	200 free	200 fly	100 medley	200 medley	400 medley	4×50 free	4×50 medley	4×50 mixed free
EC 2017	3rd place, bronze medalist(s)	3rd place, bronze medalist(s)	DNS		9th				
EC 2019	5th	2nd place, silver medalist(s)		8th	4th	1st (h)	4th	13th	2nd place, silver medalist(s)
EC 2023					1st place, gold medalist(s)		1st place, gold medalist(s)		
EC 2025		1st place, gold medalist(s)							
WC 2021		4th		DNS	7th	DNS			

== Personal best times ==
=== Long course metres (50 m pool) ===
Event	Time	Meet	Location	Date	Notes	Ref
100 m freestyle	47.87	2019 British Swimming Championships	Glasgow, Scotland	18 April 2019	NR	
200 m freestyle	1:44.26	2020 Summer Olympics	Tokyo, Japan	27 July 2021	NR	
100 m butterfly	52.25	2019 British Swimming Championships	Glasgow, Scotland	19 April 2019	NR	
200 m butterfly	1:56.60	2018 Commonwealth Games	Gold Coast, Australia	7 April 2018		
200 m individual medley	1:55.28	2020 Summer Olympics	Tokyo, Japan	30 July 2021	CR, NR	
400 m individual medley	4:09.18	2022 British Swimming Championships	Sheffield, England	7 April 2022	NR, Former CR	
4x200m Men's Freestyle Relay	6:59.43	2024 Summer Olympic Games	Paris, France	30 July 2024	Along with Matthew Richards, James Guy and Tom Dean	

Legend: CR – Commonwealth record; NR – Scottish record; e – equalled existing record;
Records not set in finals: h – heat; sf – semifinal; r – relay 1st leg; rh – relay heat 1st leg; b – B final; † – en route to final mark; so – swim-off; tt – time trial

=== Short course metres (25 m pool) ===
Event	Time	Meet	Location	Date	Notes	Ref
100 m freestyle	46.09	2019 International Swimming League	Las Vegas, United States	21 December 2019	NR	
200 m freestyle	1:39.83	2024 World Aquatics Swimming World Cup	Singapore	2 November 2024	CR, NR	
400 m freestyle	3:34.46	2024 World Aquatics Swimming World Cup	Singapore	31 October 2024	CR, NR	
100 m individual medley	51.14	2024 World Aquatics Swimming World Cup	Shanghai, China	18 October 2024	NR	
200 m individual medley	1:51.53	2021 International Swimming League	Eindhoven, Netherlands	3 December 2021	NR	
400 m individual medley	3:59.81	2019 International Swimming League	Las Vegas, United States	20 December 2019	NR	

Legend: CR – Commonwealth record; NR – Scottish record; e – equalled existing record;
Records not set in finals: h – heat; sf – semifinal; r – relay 1st leg; rh – relay heat 1st leg; b – B final; † – en route to final mark; so – swim-off; tt – time trial

== Awards and honours ==
- International Swimming League, Match Most Valuable Player: 2021 Match 15

== See also ==
- List of Commonwealth Games medallists in swimming (men)
- List of 2015 European Games medal winners
- List of World Aquatics Championships medalists in swimming (men)
- List of Youth Olympic Games gold medalists who won Olympic gold medals
