= Kotaro Takahashi =

Japanese swimmer (born 1994)

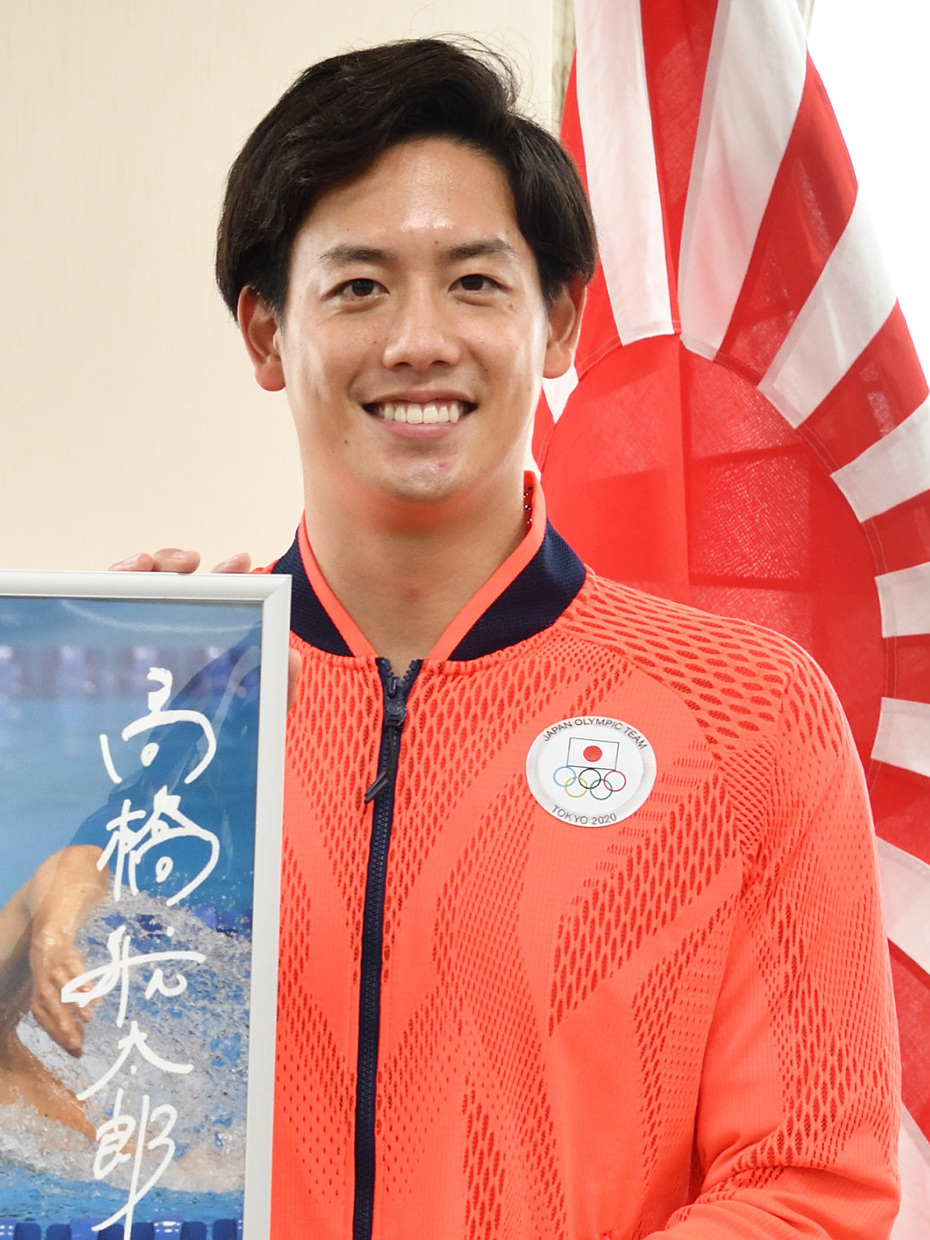

Personal information
- Nationality: Japanese
- Born: 15 March 1994 (age 31); Shizuoka, Japan

Sport
- Sport: Swimming

Kotaro Takahashi (高橋航太郎, Takahashi Kōtarō, born 15 March 1994) is a Japanese swimmer. He competed in the men's 4 × 200 metre freestyle relay at the 2020 Summer Olympics.
