= Finn McGeever =

Irish swimmer

Personal information
- Nationality: Irish
- Born: 20 October 2000 (age 25)
- Home town: Ballina, County Tipperary

Sport
- Country: Ireland
- Sport: Swimming
- Team: National Centre Limerick
- Coached by: John Szaranek

Finn McGeever (born 20 October 2000) is an Irish swimmer. He competed in the men's 4 × 200 metre freestyle relay for Team Ireland at the 2020 Summer Olympics.

He and his teammates became the first ever Irish quartet to compete in the 4 × 200 m freestyle relay at an Olympic Games.

The Tokyo Olympics were only his second senior competitive swimming event, having previous competed at the European Aquatics Championships in 2021. He previously broke his first Irish senior record in the 400m freestyle final at the Irish National Team Trials in April 2021.

McGeever is also a student at the University of Limerick, studying Physics and Mathematics.
