= Alessio Proietti Colonna =

Italian swimmer (born 1998)

Personal information
- Nationality: Italian
- Born: 7 May 1998 (age 28)

Sport
- Sport: Swimming
- Strokes: Freestyle
- Club: G.S. Marina Militare
Medal record
European Championships (LC)
Bronze medal – third place	2018 Glasgow	4×200 m freestyle
World University Games
Silver medal – second place	2021 Chengdu	4×200 m freestyle

Alessio Proietti Colonna (born 7 May 1998) is an Italian swimmer.

Proietti Colonna is an athlete of the Gruppo Sportivo della Marina Militare.

== Biography ==
He competed in the 4 × 200 m freestyle relay event at the 2018 European Aquatics Championships, winning the bronze medal.
