= 2020 European Aquatics Championships =

Water sport competitions

35th European Aquatics Championships
- Host city: Budapest, Hungary
- Date: 10–23 May 2021
- Venue(s): Danube Arena (swimming, diving, artistic swimming); Lupa Lake (open water swimming)
- Nations: 51
- Events: 73

The 2020 European Aquatics Championships (also known as the 2021 European Aquatics Championships; 35th) were scheduled to take place in Budapest, Hungary, from 11 to 24 May 2020. However, on 5 May it was announced that the event had been postponed due to the COVID-19 pandemic, with 10 to 23 May 2021 set as replacement dates.

== Schedule ==
A total of 73 medal events were held across 4 disciplines. Competition dates by discipline are:

- Swimming: 17–23 May
- Open water swimming: 12–16 May
- Artistic swimming: 10–15 May
- Diving: 10–16 May

●	Finals

May	10	11	12	13	14	15	16	17	18	19	20	21	22	23	Total
Swimming								4	6	6	6	6	6	9	43
Open water swimming			2	2		1	2								7
Artistic swimming	1	1	2	2	3	1									10
Diving	1	2	2	2	2	2	2								13
Total	2	3	6	6	5	4	4	4	6	6	6	6	6	9	73
Cumulative Total	2	5	11	17	22	26	30	34	40	46	52	58	64	73	73

== Venues ==
The venues of the competition will be the Danube Arena, in central Budapest, for swimming, diving and artistic swimming events and the Lupa Lake, located in the town of Budakalász (part of the Budapest metropolitan area) for open water swimming events. Three other venues will be used for practice and training: the Komjádi Pool, the BVSC Pool and the Széchy Tamás Pool.

Budapest	Budakalász	2020 European Aquatics Championships is located in Hungary
Danube Arena	Lupa Lake	2020 European Aquatics Championships is located in Hungary
Capacity: 5,300		2020 European Aquatics Championships is located in Hungary

== Overall medal table ==
* Host nation (Hungary)

Rank	Nation	Gold	Silver	Bronze	Total
1	Russia	20	9	13	42
2	Great Britain	12	13	7	32
3	Italy	10	14	20	44
4	Ukraine	7	5	2	14
5	Netherlands	6	5	1	12
6	Hungary*	5	4	6	15
7	Germany	5	2	4	11
8	France	2	5	3	10
9	Spain	1	4	2	7
10	Greece	1	2	3	6
11	Finland	1	1	0	2
11	Romania	1	1	0	2
13	Sweden	1	0	3	4
14	Israel	1	0	1	2
15	Czech Republic	1	0	0	1
16	Switzerland	0	3	1	4
17	Belarus	0	2	2	4
18	Austria	0	1	2	3
19	Denmark	0	1	1	2
20	Bulgaria	0	1	0	1
20	Poland	0	1	0	1
22	Lithuania	0	0	1	1
Totals (22 entries)		74	74	72	220

== Team trophy ==
Results:

=== Swimming (50 m) ===
Rank	Team	Points
1	Italy	951
2	Great Britain	869
3	Russia	766
4	Hungary	623
5	Netherlands	420
6	France	350
7	Poland	264
8	Sweden	247
9	Denmark	246
10	Spain	231

=== Open water swimming ===
Rank	Team	Points
1	Italy	199
2	France	154
3	Hungary	138
4	Germany	126
5	Russia	120
6	Netherlands	68
7	Czech Republic	53
8	Spain	31
9	Austria	23
10	Portugal	22

=== Artistic swimming ===
Rank	Team	Points
1	Ukraine	1140
2	Belarus	1088
3	Spain	771
4	Russia	744
5	Hungary	688
6	Israel	660
7	Great Britain	610
8	Slovakia	503
9	Switzerland	475
10	Italy	447

=== Diving ===
Rank	Team	Points
1	Russia	267
2	Germany	219
3	Great Britain	209
4	Italy	197
5	Ukraine	173
6	Sweden	37
7	Switzerland	30
8	Hungary	28
8	Norway	28
10	Poland	24

== Swimming ==
=== Medal table ===
* Host nation (Hungary)

Rank	Nation	Gold	Silver	Bronze	Total
1	Great Britain	11	9	6	26
2	Russia	9	5	8	22
3	Italy	5	9	13	27
4	Hungary*	5	3	4	12
5	Netherlands	4	5	1	10
6	Ukraine	2	1	0	3
7	France	1	2	2	5
8	Spain	1	1	1	3
9	Finland	1	1	0	2
9	Romania	1	1	0	2
11	Greece	1	0	2	3
11	Sweden	1	0	2	3
13	Czech Republic	1	0	0	1
13	Israel	1	0	0	1
15	Switzerland	0	2	1	3
16	Denmark	0	1	1	2
17	Austria	0	1	0	1
17	Belarus	0	1	0	1
17	Bulgaria	0	1	0	1
17	Poland	0	1	0	1
21	Lithuania	0	0	1	1
Totals (21 entries)		44	44	42	130

=== Men ===
Event	Gold		Silver		Bronze	
50 m freestyle	Ari-Pekka Liukkonen; Finland	21.61	Ben Proud; Great Britain	21.69	Kristian Golomeev; Greece	21.73
100 m freestyle	Kliment Kolesnikov; Russia	47.37; CR	Alessandro Miressi; Italy	47.45; NR	Andrey Minakov; Russia	47.74
200 m freestyle	Martin Malyutin; Russia	1:44.79; CR	Duncan Scott; Great Britain	1:45.19	Tom Dean; Great Britain	1:45.34
400 m freestyle	Martin Malyutin; Russia	3:44.18	Felix Auböck; Austria	3:44.63	Danas Rapšys; Lithuania	3:45.39
800 m freestyle	Mykhailo Romanchuk; Ukraine	7:42.61	Gregorio Paltrinieri; Italy	7:43.62	Gabriele Detti; Italy	7:46.10
1500 m freestyle	Mykhailo Romanchuk; Ukraine	14:39.89	Gregorio Paltrinieri; Italy	14:42.91	Domenico Acerenza; Italy	14:54.36
50 m backstroke	Kliment Kolesnikov; Russia	23.80; WR	Robert Glință; Romania	24.42	Hugo González; Spain	24.47; NR
100 m backstroke	Robert Glință; Romania	52.88; NR	Hugo González; Spain	52.90	Apostolos Christou; Greece Yohann Ndoye-Brouard; France	52.97
200 m backstroke	Evgeny Rylov; Russia	1:54.46	Luke Greenbank; Great Britain	1:54.62	Roman Mityukov; Switzerland	1:56.33; NR
50 m breaststroke	Adam Peaty; Great Britain	26.21	Ilya Shymanovich; Belarus	26.55	Nicolò Martinenghi; Italy	26.68
100 m breaststroke	Adam Peaty; Great Britain	57.66	Arno Kamminga; Netherlands	58.10	James Wilby; Great Britain	58.58
200 m breaststroke	Anton Chupkov; Russia	2:06.99	Arno Kamminga; Netherlands	2:07.35	Erik Persson; Sweden	2:07.66; NR
50 m butterfly	Szebasztián Szabó; Hungary	23.00	Andriy Govorov; Ukraine	23.01	Andrey Zhilkin; Russia	23.08
100 m butterfly	Kristóf Milák; Hungary	50.18; CR, NR	Josif Miladinov; Bulgaria	50.93; NR	James Guy; Great Britain	50.99
200 m butterfly	Kristóf Milák; Hungary	1:51.10; CR	Federico Burdisso; Italy	1:54.28	Tamás Kenderesi; Hungary	1:54.43
200 m individual medley	Hugo González; Spain	1:56.76; NR	Jérémy Desplanches; Switzerland	1:56.95	Alberto Razzetti; Italy	1:57.25
400 m individual medley	Ilya Borodin; Russia	4:10.02; WJ, NR	Alberto Razzetti; Italy	4:11.17	Max Litchfield; Great Britain	4:11.56
4 × 100 m freestyle relay	Russia; Andrey Minakov (48.18); Aleksandr Shchegolev (47.64); Vladislav Grinev (47.49); Kliment Kolesnikov (47.10); Andrey Zhilkin^{[a]} Mikhail Vekovishchev^{[a]} Ivan Girev^{[a]} Evgeny Rylov^{[a]}	3:10.41; CR	Great Britain; Tom Dean (48.32); Matthew Richards (48.13); James Guy (47.92); Duncan Scott (47.19); Jacob Whittle^{[a]} Joe Litchfield^{[a]}	3:11.56; NR	Italy; Alessandro Miressi (47.74); Lorenzo Zazzeri (48.30); Thomas Ceccon (47.98); Manuel Frigo (47.85); Leonardo Deplano^{[a]}	3:11.87
4 × 200 m freestyle relay	Russia; Martin Malyutin (1:45.15); Aleksandr Shchegolev (1:45.39); Aleksandr Krasnykh (1:46.52); Mikhail Vekovishchev (1:46.42); Ivan Girev^{[a]}	7:03.48; CR	Great Britain; Tom Dean (1:46.47); Matthew Richards (1:46.97); James Guy (1:45.88); Duncan Scott (1:45.29); Max Litchfield^{[a]} Calum Jarvis^{[a]}	7:04.61	Italy; Stefano Ballo (1:47.30); Matteo Ciampi (1:46.17); Marco De Tullio (1:46.02); Stefano Di Cola (1:46.56); Manuel Frigo^{[a]} Filippo Megli^{[a]}	7:06.05
4 × 100 m medley relay	Great Britain; Luke Greenbank (53.64); Adam Peaty (57.38); James Guy (50.65); Duncan Scott (46.92); Joe Litchfield^{[a]} James Wilby^{[a]} Tom Dean^{[a]}	3:28.59; CR	Russia; Kliment Kolesnikov (52.13); Kirill Prigoda (59.02); Mikhail Vekovishchev (50.94); Andrey Minakov (47.41); Evgeny Rylov^{[a]} Anton Chupkov^{[a]} Alexander Kudashev^{[a]} Aleksandr Shchegolev^{[a]}	3:29.50	Italy; Thomas Ceccon (53.59); Nicolò Martinenghi (57.84); Federico Burdisso (51.29); Alessandro Miressi (47.21); Alessandro Pinzuti^{[a]} Piero Codia^{[a]}	3:29.93; NR

^{a} Swimmers who participated in the heats only and received medals.

=== Women ===
Event	Gold		Silver		Bronze	
50 m freestyle	Ranomi Kromowidjojo; Netherlands	23.97	Pernille Blume; Denmark Katarzyna Wasick; Poland	24.17 24.17; NR	None awarded	
100 m freestyle	Femke Heemskerk; Netherlands	53.05	Marie Wattel; France	53.32	Anna Hopkin; Great Britain	53.43
200 m freestyle	Barbora Seemanová; Czech Republic	1:56.27; NR	Federica Pellegrini; Italy	1:56.29	Freya Anderson; Great Britain	1:56.42
400 m freestyle	Simona Quadarella; Italy	4:04.66	Anna Egorova; Russia	4:06.05	Boglárka Kapás; Hungary	4:06.90
800 metre freestyle	Simona Quadarella; Italy	8:20.23	Anastasiya Kirpichnikova; Russia	8:21.86	Anna Egorova; Russia	8:26.56
1500 m freestyle	Simona Quadarella; Italy	15:53.59	Anastasiya Kirpichnikova; Russia	16:01.06	Martina Caramignoli; Italy	16:05.81
50 m backstroke	Kira Toussaint; Netherlands	27.36	Kathleen Dawson; Great Britain	27.46	Maaike de Waard; Netherlands	27.74
100 m backstroke	Kathleen Dawson; Great Britain	58.49	Margherita Panziera; Italy	59.01	Maria Kameneva; Russia	59.22
200 m backstroke	Margherita Panziera; Italy	2:06.08; CR	Cassie Wild; Great Britain	2:07.74	Katalin Burián; Hungary	2:07.87
50 m breaststroke	Benedetta Pilato; Italy	29.35	Ida Hulkko; Finland	30.19; NR	Yuliya Yefimova; Russia	30.22
100 m breaststroke	Sophie Hansson; Sweden	1:05.69 =NR	Arianna Castiglioni; Italy	1:06.13	Martina Carraro; Italy	1:06.21
200 m breaststroke	Molly Renshaw; Great Britain	2:21.34	Lisa Mamié; Switzerland	2:22.05; NR	Yuliya Yefimova; Russia	2:22.16
50 m butterfly	Ranomi Kromowidjojo; Netherlands	25.30	Mélanie Henique; France	25.46	Emilie Beckmann; Denmark	25.59
100 m butterfly	Anna Doudounaki; Greece Marie Wattel; France	57.37; NR 57.37	None awarded		Louise Hansson; Sweden	57.56
200 m butterfly	Boglárka Kapás; Hungary	2:06.50	Katinka Hosszú; Hungary	2:08.14	Svetlana Chimrova; Russia	2:08.55
200 m individual medley	Anastasia Gorbenko; Israel	2:09.99; NR	Abbie Wood; Great Britain	2:10.03	Katinka Hosszú; Hungary	2:10.12
400 m individual medley	Katinka Hosszú; Hungary	4:34.76	Viktória Mihályvári-Farkas; Hungary Aimee Willmott; Great Britain	4:36.81	None awarded	
4 × 100 m freestyle relay	Great Britain; Lucy Hope (53.89); Anna Hopkin (53.59); Abbie Wood (53.90); Freya Anderson (52.79); Evelyn Davis^{[b]} Emma Russell^{[b]}	3:34.17; NR	Netherlands; Ranomi Kromowidjojo (53.56); Kira Toussaint (54.61); Marrit Steenbergen (54.13); Femke Heemskerk (51.99); Kim Busch^{[b]} Robin Neumann^{[b]}	3:34.29	France; Marie Wattel (53.97); Charlotte Bonnet (53.36); Anouchka Martin (54.25); Assia Touati (54.34); Lison Nowaczyk^{[b]}	3:35.92
4 × 200 m freestyle relay	Great Britain; Lucy Hope (1:58.45); Tamryn van Selm (1:58.59); Holly Hibbott (1:59.71); Freya Anderson (1:56.40); Emma Russell^{[b]}	7:53.15	Hungary; Zsuzsanna Jakabos (1:59.34); Fanni Fábián (2:00.19); Laura Veres (1:59.23); Boglárka Kapás (1:57.50); Evelyn Verrasztó^{[b]}	7:56.26	Italy; Stefania Pirozzi (1:59.3); Sara Gailli (1:59.94); Simona Quadarella (2:00.61); Federica Pellegrini (1:56.54); Lisa Angiolini^{[b]}	7:56.72
4 × 100 m medley relay	Great Britain; Kathleen Dawson (58.08) ER; Molly Renshaw (1:05.72); Laura Stephens (57.55); Anna Hopkin (52.66); Cassie Wild^{[b]} Sarah Vasey^{[b]} Harriet Jones^{[b]} Freya Anderson^{[b]}	3:54.01; CR, NR	Russia; Maria Kameneva (59.47); Yuliya Yefimova (1:05.77); Svetlana Chimrova (56.78); Arina Surkova (54.23); Anastasia Fesikova^{[b]} Evgeniia Chikunova^{[b]}	3:56.25	Italy; Margherita Panziera (59.71); Arianna Castiglioni (1:05.66); Elena Di Liddo (57.27); Federica Pellegrini (53.66); Silvia Scalia^{[b]} Martina Carraro^{[b]} Silvia Di Pietro^{[b]}	3:56.30; NR

^{b} Swimmers who participated in the heats only and received medals.

=== Mixed events ===
Event	Gold		Silver		Bronze	
4 × 100 m mixed freestyle relay	Great Britain; Duncan Scott (48.20); Tom Dean (48.11); Anna Hopkin (52.88); Freya Anderson (52.88); Matthew Richards^{[c]} Jacob Whittle^{[c]} Evelyn Davis^{[c]} Lucy Hope^{[c]}	3:22.07 =CR, NR	Netherlands; Stan Pijnenburg (48.55); Jesse Puts (48.39); Ranomi Kromowidjojo (53.59); Femke Heemskerk (51.73); Luc Kroon^{[c]} Marrit Steenbergen^{[c]} Kim Busch^{[c]}	3:22.26	Italy; Alessandro Miressi (47.63); Thomas Ceccon (47.59); Federica Pellegrini (53.58); Silvia Di Pietro (53.84); Manuel Frigo^{[c]} Chiara Tarantino^{[c]}	3:22.64; NR
4 × 200 m mixed freestyle relay	Great Britain; Thomas Dean (1:46.54); James Guy (1:45.43); Abbie Wood (1:56.67); Freya Anderson (1:58.03); Calum Jarvis^{[c]} Joe Litchfield^{[c]} Lucy Hope^{[c]}	7:26.67; CR	Italy; Stefano Ballo (1:46.96); Stefano Di Cola (1:46.16); Federica Pellegrini (1:55.66); Margherita Panziera (2:00.57); Stefania Pirozzi^{[c]} Filippo Megli^{[c]} Sara Gailli^{[c]}	7:29.35	Russia; Aleksandr Shchegolev (1:46.66); Aleksandr Krasnykh (1:47.05); Anna Egorova (1:58.52); Anastasiya Kirpichnikova (1:59.31); Ivan Girev^{[c]} Evgeny Rylov^{[c]} Maria Kameneva^{[c]} Arina Surkova^{[c]}	7:31.54
4 × 100 m mixed medley relay	Great Britain; Kathleen Dawson (58.43); Adam Peaty (57.13); James Guy (50.61); Anna Hopkin (52.65); Joe Litchfield^{[c]} Harriet Jones^{[c]}	3:38.82; ER	Netherlands; Kira Toussaint (59.59); Arno Kamminga (58.37); Nyls Korstanje (51.45); Femke Heemskerk (51.87); Ranomi Kromowidjojo^{[c]}	3:41.28; NR	Italy; Margherita Panziera (59.55); Nicolò Martinenghi (58.05); Elena Di Liddo (57.54); Alessandro Miressi (47.16); Simone Sabbioni^{[c]} Silvia Di Pietro^{[c]}	3:42.30; NR

^{c} Swimmers who participated in the heats only and received medals.

== Diving ==
=== Medal table ===
Rank	Nation	Gold	Silver	Bronze	Total
1	Russia	5	4	4	13
2	Germany	4	1	3	8
3	Italy	2	3	2	7
4	Great Britain	1	4	1	6
5	Ukraine	1	0	2	3
6	Switzerland	0	1	0	1
7	Sweden	0	0	1	1
Totals (7 entries)		13	13	13	39

=== Men ===
Event	Gold		Silver		Bronze	
1 m springboard	Patrick Hausding; Germany	427.75	Jack Laugher; Great Britain	402.90	Giovanni Tocci; Italy	402.50
3 m springboard	Evgeny Kuznetsov; Russia	525.20	Nikita Shleikher; Russia	505.80	Martin Wolfram; Germany	484.65
3 m springboard synchro	Germany; Patrick Hausding; Lars Rüdiger	426.78	Russia; Evgeny Kuznetsov; Nikita Shleikher	415.47	Ukraine; Oleksandr Horshkovozov; Oleh Kolodiy	409.92
10 m platform	Aleksandr Bondar; Russia	564.35	Tom Daley; Great Britain	533.30	Viktor Minibaev; Russia	530.05
10 m platform synchro	Great Britain; Tom Daley; Matty Lee	477.57	Russia; Aleksandr Bondar; Viktor Minibaev	471.96	Germany; Timo Barthel; Patrick Hausding	424.32

=== Women ===
Event	Gold		Silver		Bronze	
1 m springboard	Elena Bertocchi; Italy	259.90	Michelle Heimberg; Switzerland	255.55	Chiara Pellacani; Italy	254.15
3 m springboard	Tina Punzel; Germany	330.85	Chiara Pellacani; Italy	321.15	Emma Gullstrand; Sweden	319.60
3 m springboard synchro	Germany; Lena Hentschel; Tina Punzel	307.29	Italy; Elena Bertocchi; Chiara Pellacani	307.20	Russia; Uliana Kliueva; Vitaliia Koroleva	291.00
10 m platform	Anna Konanykhina; Russia	365.25	Yulia Timoshinina; Russia	329.20	Andrea Spendolini-Sirieix; Great Britain	326.60
10 m platform synchro	Russia; Ekaterina Beliaeva; Yulia Timoshinina	307.44	Great Britain; Eden Cheng; Lois Toulson	290.58	Ukraine; Kseniya Baylo; Sofiya Lyskun	286.74

=== Mixed events ===
Event	Gold		Silver		Bronze	
Mixed 3 m springboard synchro	Italy; Chiara Pellacani; Matteo Santoro	300.69	Germany; Tina Punzel; Lou Massenberg	294.27	Russia; Vitaliia Koroleva; Ilia Molchanov	289.50
Mixed 10 m platform synchro	Ukraine; Kseniya Baylo; Oleksiy Sereda	325.68	Great Britain; Andrea Spendolini-Sirieix; Noah Williams	307.32	Russia; Ekaterina Beliaeva; Viktor Minibaev	302.58
Team event	Russia; Kristina Ilinykh; Evgeny Kuznetsov; Ekaterina Beliaeva; Viktor Minibaev	431.80	Italy; Chiara Pellacani; Andreas Sargent Larsen; Sarah Jodoin Di Maria; Riccardo Giovannini	428.00	Germany; Tina Punzel; Patrick Hausding; Christina Wassen; Lou Massenberg	421.00

== Open water swimming ==
=== Medal table ===
* Host nation (Hungary)

Rank	Nation	Gold	Silver	Bronze	Total
1	Italy	3	2	3	8
2	Netherlands	2	0	0	2
3	France	1	3	1	5
4	Germany	1	1	1	3
5	Hungary*	0	1	1	2
6	Russia	0	0	1	1
Totals (6 entries)		7	7	7	21

=== Men ===
Event	Gold		Silver		Bronze	
5 km	Gregorio Paltrinieri; Italy	55:43.3	Marc-Antoine Olivier; France	55:45.1	Dario Verani; Italy	55:46.6
10 km	Gregorio Paltrinieri; Italy	1:51:30.6	Marc-Antoine Olivier; France	1:51:41.7	Florian Wellbrock; Germany	1:51:42.0
25 km	Axel Reymond; France	4:35:59.8	Matteo Furlan; Italy	4:36:05.1	Kirill Abrosimov; Russia	4:36:06.2

=== Women ===
Event	Gold		Silver		Bronze	
5 km	Sharon van Rouwendaal; Netherlands	58:45.2	Giulia Gabbrielleschi; Italy	58:49.3	Océane Cassignol; France	58:51.4
10 km	Sharon van Rouwendaal; Netherlands	1:59:12.7	Anna Olasz; Hungary	1:59:13.0	Rachele Bruni; Italy	1:59:15.1
25 km	Lea Boy; Germany	4:53:57.0	Lara Grangeon; France	4:54:58.4	Barbara Pozzobon; Italy	4:54:58.7

=== Mixed events ===
Event	Gold		Silver		Bronze	
Team event	Italy; Rachele Bruni; Giulia Gabbrielleschi; Gregorio Paltrinieri; Domenico Acerenza	54:09.0	Germany; Lea Boy; Leonie Beck; Rob Muffels; Florian Wellbrock	54:18.0	Hungary; Réka Rohács; Anna Olasz; Dávid Betlehem; Kristóf Rasovszky	54:18.5

== Artistic swimming ==
=== Medal table ===
* Host nation (Hungary)

Rank	Nation	Gold	Silver	Bronze	Total
1	Russia	6	0	0	6
2	Ukraine	4	4	0	8
3	Spain	0	3	1	4
4	Greece	0	2	1	3
5	Belarus	0	1	2	3
6	Austria	0	0	2	2
6	Italy	0	0	2	2
8	Hungary*	0	0	1	1
8	Israel	0	0	1	1
Totals (9 entries)		10	10	10	30

=== Results ===
Event	Gold		Silver		Bronze	
Solo free routine	Varvara Subbotina; Russia	96.4333	Marta Fiedina; Ukraine	93.7000	Evangelia Platanioti; Greece	90.8000
Solo technical routine	Marta Fiedina; Ukraine	91.8445	Evangelia Platanioti; Greece	89.2897	Vasilina Khandoshka; Belarus	87.7173
Duet free routine	Russia; Svetlana Kolesnichenko; Svetlana Romashina	97.9000	Ukraine; Marta Fiedina; Anastasiya Savchuk	94.3333	Austria; Anna-Maria Alexandri; Eirini-Marina Alexandri	90.8667
Duet technical routine	Russia; Svetlana Kolesnichenko; Svetlana Romashina	96.2904	Ukraine; Marta Fiedina; Anastasiya Savchuk	92.6862	Austria; Anna-Maria Alexandri; Eirini-Marina Alexandri	89.4592
Team free routine	Ukraine; Maryna Aleksiyiva; Vladyslava Aleksiyiva; Marta Fiedina; Kateryna Reznik; Anastasiya Savchuk; Alina Shynkarenko; Kseniya Sydorenko; Yelyzaveta Yakhno	95.0667	Spain; Abril Conesa; Berta Ferreras; Meritxell Mas; Alisa Ozhogina; Paula Ramírez; Sara Saldaña; Iris Tió; Blanca Toledano	91.2333	Israel; Eden Blecher; Shelly Bobritsky; Maya Dorf; Noy Gazala; Catherine Kunin; Nikol Nahshonov; Ariel Nassee; Polina Prikazchikova	86.8000
Team technical routine	Russia; Vlada Chigireva; Marina Goliadkina; Veronika Kalinina; Svetlana Kolesnichenko; Polina Komar; Svetlana Romashina; Alla Shishkina; Maria Shurochkina	95.6705	Ukraine; Maryna Aleksiyiva; Vladyslava Aleksiyiva; Marta Fiedina; Kateryna Reznik; Anastasiya Savchuk; Alina Shynkarenko; Kseniya Sydorenko; Yelyzaveta Yakhno	92.3920	Spain; Ona Carbonell; Berta Ferreras; Meritxell Mas; Alisa Ozhogina; Paula Ramírez; Sara Saldaña; Iris Tió; Blanca Toledano	89.7700
Combination routine	Ukraine; Maryna Aleksiyiva; Vladyslava Aleksiyiva; Olesia Derevianchenko; Marta Fiedina; Veronika Hryshko; Kateryna Reznik; Anastasiya Savchuk; Alina Shynkarenko; Kseniya Sydorenko; Yelyzaveta Yakhno	94.7000	Greece; Maria Alzigkouzi Kominea; Eleni Deligianni; Eleni Fragkaki; Krystalenia Gialama; Pinelopi Karamesiou; Zoe Karangelou; Dane Kariori; Andriana Misikevych; Georgia Vasilopoulou; Violeta Zouzouni	89.1000	Belarus; Vera Butsel; Marharyta Kiryliuk; Hanna Koutsun; Yana Kudzina; Kseniya Kuliashova; Anastasiya Navasiolava; Valeryia Puz; Anastasiya Suvalava; Kseniya Tratseuskaya; Aliaksandra Vysotskaya	86.0667
Highlights routine	Ukraine; Maryna Aleksiyiva; Vladyslava Aleksiyiva; Marta Fiedina; Veronika Hryshko; Anna Nosova; Kateryna Reznik; Anastasiya Savchuk; Alina Shynkarenko; Kseniya Sydorenko; Yelyzaveta Yakhno	95.3000	Belarus; Vera Butsel; Marharyta Kiryliuk; Hanna Koutsun; Yana Kudzina; Kseniya Kuliashova; Anastasiya Navasiolava; Valeryia Puz; Anastasiya Suvalava; Kseniya Tratseuskaya; Aliaksandra Vysotskaya	86.5667	Hungary; Niké Barta; Katalin Csilling; Linda Farkas; Boglárka Gács; Lilien Götz; Hanna Hatala; Szabina Hungler; Adelin Regényi; Luca Rényi; Anna Viktória Szabó	79.1000
Mixed free routine	Russia; Olesya Platonova; Aleksandr Maltsev	93.9333	Spain; Emma García; Pau Ribes	86.5333	Italy; Isotta Sportelli; Nicolò Ogliari	81.8667
Mixed technical routine	Russia; Mayya Gurbanberdieva; Aleksandr Maltsev	91.7963	Spain; Emma García; Pau Ribes	84.8697	Italy; Isotta Sportelli; Nicolò Ogliari	77.4281
