= Mikhail Vekovishchev =

Russian swimmer (born 1998)

Personal information
- Full name: Mikhail Dmitriyevich Vekovishchev
- National team: Russia
- Born: 5 August 1998 (age 27) Obninsk, Kaluga Oblast, Russia
- Height: 1.85 m (6 ft 1 in)
- Weight: 83 kg (183 lb)

Sport
- Sport: Swimming
- Strokes: Freestyle
Medal record
Men's swimming
Representing (Russia) ROC
Olympic Games
| Silver medal – second place | 2020 Tokyo | 4×200 m freestyle |
Representing Russian Swimming Federation
World Championships (SC)
| Silver medal – second place | 2021 Abu Dhabi | 4×200 m freestyle |
Representing Neutral Athletes B
World Masters Championships
| Gold medal – first place | 2025 Singapore | 100 m freestyle |
| Gold medal – first place | 2025 Singapore | 50 m butterfly |
| Gold medal – first place | 2025 Singapore | 100 m butterfly |
Representing Russia
World Championships (LC)
| Silver medal – second place | 2017 Budapest | 4×200 m freestyle |
| Silver medal – second place | 2019 Gwangju | 4×200 m freestyle |
| Bronze medal – third place | 2019 Gwangju | 4×100 m medley |
World Championships (SC)
| Gold medal – first place | 2016 Windsor | 4×100 m freestyle |
| Disqualified | 2016 Windsor | 4×200 m freestyle |
| Gold medal – first place | 2018 Hangzhou | 4×50 m medley |
| Silver medal – second place | 2018 Hangzhou | 4×100 m freestyle |
| Silver medal – second place | 2018 Hangzhou | 4×200 m freestyle |
| Silver medal – second place | 2018 Hangzhou | 4×100 m medley |
European Championships (LC)
| Gold medal – first place | 2020 Budapest | 4×100 m freestyle |
| Gold medal – first place | 2020 Budapest | 4×200 m freestyle |
| Silver medal – second place | 2018 Glasgow | 4×200 m freestyle |
| Silver medal – second place | 2018 Glasgow | 4×200 m mixed freestyle |
| Silver medal – second place | 2020 Budapest | 4×100 m medley |
European Championships (SC)
| Gold medal – first place | 2017 Copenhagen | 4×50 m freestyle |
| Gold medal – first place | 2017 Copenhagen | 4×50 m medley |
| Gold medal – first place | 2019 Glasgow | 4×50 m freestyle |
| Gold medal – first place | 2019 Glasgow | 4×50 m medley relay |
| Gold medal – first place | 2019 Glasgow | 4×50 m mixed freestyle |
| Silver medal – second place | 2017 Copenhagen | 4×50 m mixed freestyle |
| Silver medal – second place | 2019 Glasgow | 100 m butterfly |
| Bronze medal – third place | 2019 Glasgow | 200 m freestyle |
Summer Universiade
| Silver medal – second place | 2017 Taipei | 4x100 m medley |
| Bronze medal – third place | 2017 Taipei | 200 m freestyle |
| Bronze medal – third place | 2017 Taipei | 4×100 m freestyle |
| Bronze medal – third place | 2017 Taipei | 4×200 m freestyle |

Mikhail Dmitriyevich Vekovishchev (Russian: Михаил Дмитриевич Вековищев, IPA: [mʲɪxɐˈil vʲɪkɐˈvʲiɕːɪf]; born 5 August 1998) is a Russian swimmer.

He competed at the 2018 European Aquatics Championships, winning the silver medal in both 4×200 m men's freestyle relay and 4×200 m mixed freestyle relay events.
