= Calum Jarvis =

Welsh swimmer

Calum Jarvis MBE
Personal information
- National team: Great Britain
- Born: 12 May 1992 (age 34) Ystrad, Rhondda, Wales, United Kingdom
- Height: 1.93 m (6 ft 4 in)
- Weight: 86 kg (190 lb)

Sport
- Sport: Swimming
- Strokes: Freestyle, Backstroke
Medal record
Men's swimming
Representing Great Britain
Olympic Games
Gold medal – first place	2020 Tokyo	4×200 m freestyle
World Championships (LC)
Gold medal – first place	2015 Kazan	4×200 m freestyle
Gold medal – first place	2017 Budapest	4×200 m freestyle
European Championships (LC)
Gold medal – first place	2018 Glasgow	4×200 m freestyle
Gold medal – first place	2020 Budapest	4×200m mixed freestyle
Silver medal – second place	2020 Budapest	4×200 m freestyle
Bronze medal – third place	2018 Glasgow	4×200m mixed freestyle
Representing Wales
Commonwealth Games
Bronze medal – third place	2014 Glasgow	200 m freestyle

Calum George Jarvis (born 12 May 1992) is a Welsh competitive swimmer who has represented Great Britain in World Championships and the Olympics, and Wales in the Commonwealth Games. Jarvis competes primarily in freestyle and backstroke events. In 2014, he competed at the Commonwealth Games in Glasgow as part of the Welsh team, winning the bronze medal in the 200m freestyle.

In 2015 at the World Championships, he formed part of the Great Britain gold medal-winning men's 4 x 200-metre freestyle relay team. In doing so, he became the first Welsh world champion in swimming In 2021, Jarvis swam the heat of the men's 4 x 200 metres freestyle relay at the 2020 Summer Olympics for the gold medal-winning Great Britain team, making him an Olympic champion in the event; along with Matt Richards, they became the first Welsh swimming Olympic champions in over 100 years.

== Career history ==
He came to note in British swimming when he finished fifth in 200m backstroke in the 2010 British Championships. The next year he bettered this by finishing fourth in the same event in the 2011 British Championship in Manchester. In 2012 he was selected to trial for the British Team for the 2012 Summer Olympics. Held at the London Aquatics Centre, Jarvis entered four events and took gold position in his favoured 200m backstroke, although his time was under the Olympic qualification time and he failed to be selected for the British team.

2012 saw Jarvis enter his first senior international championship when he represented Great Britain at the 2012 European Short Course Championships in Chartres in France. Two years later, he won his second British Championship medal when he took silver in the 200m freestyle. At the same Championship he also set a new Welsh record in the 100m freestyle. These results saw him qualify for the Wales team at the 2014 Commonwealth Games in Glasgow. Jarvis entered three events at Glasgow, the 100m and 200m freestyle and the men's 4 × 100 m freestyle relay. In the 200m freestyle he won his heat to compete in the finals. Jarvis recorded a time of 1:46.53 in the 200m final to finish third to take the bronze medal, Wales' first swimming medal of the Games.

At the 2017 World Championships, he was part of the team that won gold in the 200-metre freestyle relay. He swam in the heats but not in the final.

At the 2018 European Championships, Jarvis won a gold as part of the relay team in the 4 × 200-metre freestyle relay with Duncan Scott, Thomas Dean and James Guy.

At the 2020 Tokyo Olympics, Jarvis was part of the British team that won the men's 4 × 200 metre freestyle relay. He swam in the heats but not in the final.

Jarvis was appointed Member of the Order of the British Empire (MBE) in the 2022 New Year Honours for services to swimming.

== Personal life ==
Jarvis was born in Ystrad in the Rhondda, Wales in 1992, to Deborah Rees and John Jarvis. He was educated at St Minver Primary School then spent a year at Wadebridge School before moving to Plymouth College to pursue swimming at Plymouth Leander Swimming Club. He studied at University of Bath.

== See also ==
- List of Commonwealth Games medallists in swimming (men)
