= James Guy (swimmer) =

British swimmer (born 1995)

James Guy MBE
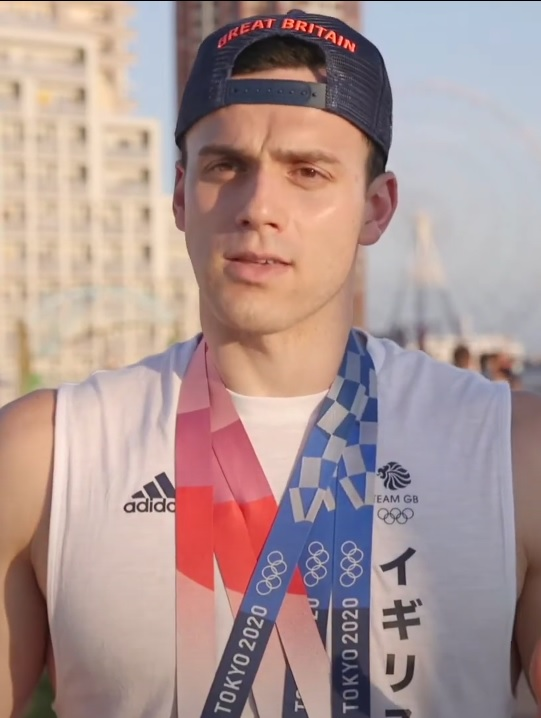
- Guy in 2021 after the 2020 Summer Olympics

Personal information
- Full name: James George Guy
- Nickname: "Jimmy"
- National team: Great Britain
- Born: 26 November 1995 (age 30) Bury, Greater Manchester, England, UK
- Height: 1.88 m (6 ft 2 in)
- Weight: 85 kg (187 lb)
- Spouse: Courtney Guy

Sport
- Sport: Swimming
- Strokes: Butterfly, freestyle
- Club: Team Bath
- Coach: Ryan Livingstone
Medal record
Event	1st	2nd	3rd
Olympic Games	3	3	0
World Championships (LC)	6	2	4
World Championships (SC)	0	1	0
European Championships (LC)	8	2	4
European Championships (SC)	0	2	1
Commonwealth Games	2	10	4
Total	19	20	13
Men's swimming
Representing Great Britain
Olympic Games
Gold medal – first place	2020 Tokyo	4×200 m freestyle
Gold medal – first place	2020 Tokyo	4×100 m mixed medley
Gold medal – first place	2024 Paris	4×200 m freestyle
Silver medal – second place	2016 Rio de Janeiro	4×200 m freestyle
Silver medal – second place	2016 Rio de Janeiro	4×100 m medley
Silver medal – second place	2020 Tokyo	4×100 m medley
World Championships (LC)
Gold medal – first place	2015 Kazan	200 m freestyle
Gold medal – first place	2015 Kazan	4×200 m freestyle
Gold medal – first place	2017 Budapest	4×200 m freestyle
Gold medal – first place	2019 Gwangju	4×100 m medley
Gold medal – first place	2023 Fukuoka	4×200 m freestyle
Gold medal – first place	2025 Singapore	4×200 m freestyle
Silver medal – second place	2015 Kazan	400 m freestyle
Silver medal – second place	2017 Budapest	4×100 m medley
Bronze medal – third place	2017 Budapest	100 m butterfly
Bronze medal – third place	2019 Gwangju	4×100 m mixed medley
Bronze medal – third place	2022 Budapest	4×200 m freestyle
Bronze medal – third place	2022 Budapest	4×100 m medley
World Championships (SC)
Silver medal – second place	2014 Doha	400 m freestyle
European Championships (LC)
Gold medal – first place	2016 London	4×100 m medley
Gold medal – first place	2018 Glasgow	4×200 m freestyle
Gold medal – first place	2018 Glasgow	4×100 m mixed medley
Gold medal – first place	2018 Glasgow	4×100 m medley
Gold medal – first place	2020 Budapest	4×100 m medley
Gold medal – first place	2020 Budapest	4×200 m mixed freestyle
Gold medal – first place	2020 Budapest	4×100 m mixed medley
Gold medal – first place	2026 Paris	4×200 m freestyle
Silver medal – second place	2020 Budapest	4×100 m freestyle
Silver medal – second place	2020 Budapest	4×200 m freestyle
Bronze medal – third place	2016 London	200 m freestyle
Bronze medal – third place	2018 Glasgow	100 m butterfly
Bronze medal – third place	2020 Budapest	100 m butterfly
Bronze medal – third place	2026 Paris	200 m freestyle
European Championships (SC)
Silver medal – second place	2019 Glasgow	4×50 m mixed freestyle
Silver medal – second place	2023 Otopeni	200 m freestyle
Bronze medal – third place	2019 Glasgow	200 m butterfly
European Junior Championships
Gold medal – first place	2013 Poznan	200 m freestyle
Gold medal – first place	2013 Poznan	4x200 m freestyle
Bronze medal – third place	2012 Antwerp	400 m freestyle
Representing England
Commonwealth Games
Gold medal – first place	2014 Glasgow	4×100 m medley
Gold medal – first place	2022 Birmingham	4×100 m medley
Silver medal – second place	2018 Gold Coast	100 m butterfly
Silver medal – second place	2018 Gold Coast	4×100 m freestyle
Silver medal – second place	2018 Gold Coast	4×200 m freestyle
Silver medal – second place	2018 Gold Coast	4×100 m medley
Silver medal – second place	2022 Birmingham	100 m butterfly
Silver medal – second place	2022 Birmingham	4×100 m freestyle
Silver medal – second place	2022 Birmingham	4×200 m freestyle
Silver medal – second place	2026 Glasgow	200 m freestyle
Silver medal – second place	2026 Glasgow	4×100 m freestyle
Silver medal – second place	2026 Glasgow	2×100 m freestyle
Bronze medal – third place	2014 Glasgow	400 m freestyle
Bronze medal – third place	2018 Gold Coast	400 m freestyle
Bronze medal – third place	2022 Birmingham	200 m butterfly
Bronze medal – third place	2022 Birmingham	4×100 m mixed medley

James George Guy (born 26 November 1995) is an English competitive swimmer who specialises in freestyle and butterfly. Guy has won multiple gold medals at each of the major international meets available to him, including for Great Britain at the Olympic Games (3), the World (6) and European Championships (8), and for England in the Commonwealth Games (2). In addition to further medals in those events, he has also reached the podium at both the World and European short-course championships. With over 50 major medals at international championship meets, 19 at global level, and nine global titles, he is one of the most decorated swimmers in British history.

Guy came to international prominence when he won two World Championship gold medals in the 200-metre freestyle and 4 × 200-metre freestyle relay event at the 2015 World Aquatics Championships, and silver in the 400 metre freestyle behind controversial Chinese swimmer Sun Yang. A prodigious relay swimmer, in 2016, he won silver in the 4 × 200 m freestyle relay and the 4 × 100 m medley relay at the Rio Olympics, finishing 4th in the individual 200 metre freestyle event. He helped defend the men's 4 × 200 metre freestyle relay world title in 2017, and swam the butterfly leg to help Great Britain to gold in the 4 × 100 metre medley relay at the 2019 World Aquatics Championships. Guy is a Commonwealth Games and seven-time European champion across various relay events. Guy competes in 4 × 100 m freestyle, 4 × 200 m freestyle, and on the butterfly legs of 4 × 100 m medley relays.

In 2021, at the 2020 Summer Olympics, Guy became Olympic champion, winning gold in the 4 × 200 metres freestyle relay for Great Britain with Tom Dean, Duncan Scott, Matt Richards and Calum Jarvis. He won a second Olympic title, the inaugural mixed medley relay, with Adam Peaty, Anna Hopkin, Kathleen Dawson and Freya Anderson. His third Olympic title, and sixth Olympic medal came once more in the 4 × 200 metres freestyle relay at the 2024 Summer Olympics, alongside Dean, Scott and Richards, (with Keiran Bird and Jack McMillan now taking heat swims). It was the first time in the history of the event that the exact same four swimmers had defended the Olympic title.

Cited for his career longevity, consistency and relay prowess, in 2026, he swam a personal best of 1:44.87 to win the bronze medal in the men's individual 200 metres freestyle at the 2026 European Aquatics Championships. In doing so, he became the only swimmer in history to swim competitively under 1:45.00 for the distance when over the age of 30, and the oldest swimmer to achieve it by over three years (next to then 27 year old Danas Rapsys. His time placed him over half a second ahead of the previous record holder for over 30 competitive swimmers, Ryan Lochte.

== Early life ==
Guy was born in Bury to Cath and Andrew Guy and has a younger brother whose name is Luke Guy. Guy was educated at Forest Preparatory School, Timperley in Trafford, Greater Manchester. When he was 13, he received a swimming scholarship to Millfield in Somerset. He was a member of Trafford Metros swimming club before he moved to Somerset.

== Career ==
Guy won his first major medal at the 2012 European Junior Championships in Antwerp where he finished in the bronze medal position in the 400 m freestyle.

In his breakthrough season in 2013, he won three medals at the World Junior Championships in Dubai, landing silver over 200 m and 400 m Freestyle then anchoring the British quartet to 4 × 200 m Freestyle Relay gold in a Championship record. He followed that up with double gold (200 m Freestyle, 4 × 200 m Freestyle) at his second European Junior Championships in Poznan.

He made his senior international debut at the 2013 World Aquatics Championships in Barcelona, lowering his British Age Group record (17 yrs) to finish fifth in the 400 m Freestyle, then setting another British Age Group record (17 yrs) as the lead-off in the 4 × 200 m Freestyle Relay as the British quartet finished seventh. James became the European and World Junior Champion in the 4 × 200 and holds the Word Junior Record in those Events.

=== 2014–15: Emergence and World titles ===
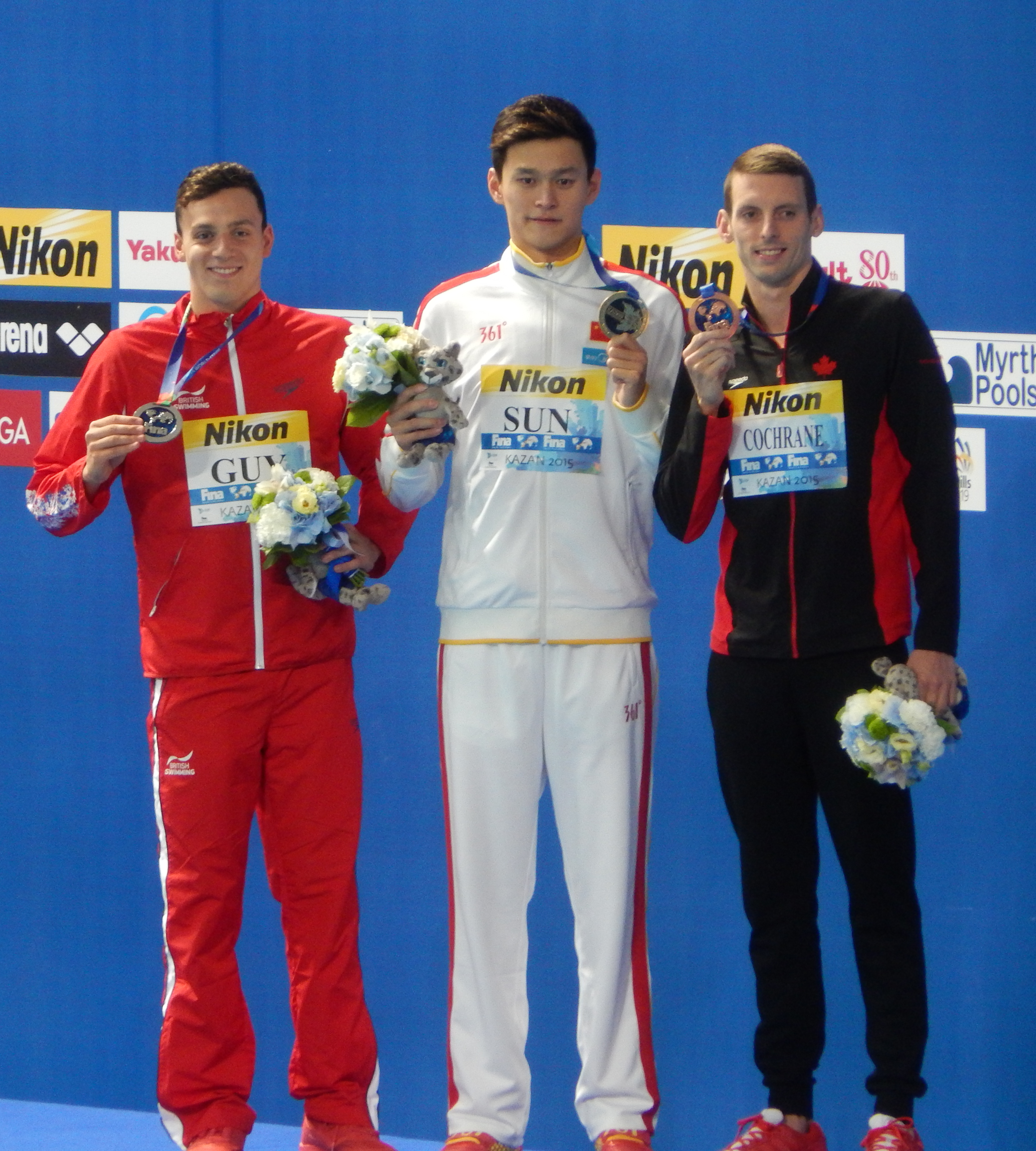
Medal ceremony for 400 m freestyle at the 2015 World Aquatics Championships

He came to senior prominence in 2014, Guy laid down a signal of intent with a hat-trick of golds at the British Gas Swimming Championships, taking the touch in the 200 m Free, 400 m Free and 200 m Fly, and breaking the British record in the 400 m Free. He represented England at the 2014 Commonwealth Games, winning two relay medals, lowering the British record again to claim 400 m Freestyle bronze for England. Thereafter, representing Great Britain, he took silver medals in the 400-metre freestyle at the FINA World Championships in both the short course (25 metre) and long course formats. On 4 August 2015, he won the 200-metre freestyle at the 2015 World Aquatics Championships, the first British swimmer to win the event in its history.

He competed for England in the 4 × 100-metre medley relay and the 400-metre freestyle events at the 2014 Commonwealth Games where he won a gold and bronze medal respectively.

At the 200-metre freestyle event at the 2015 World Aquatics Championships, Guy won the gold medal beating Olympic silver medallist Sun Yang of China by six hundredths of a second.

At the same event, Guy struck gold again in the 4 × 200 m freestyle relay. Team GB was third at the last take over, when Guy took over. He swam his 200 in a 1:44.7, the quickest time across the pool and securing Great Britain the gold medal for the first time at the worlds in this event.

=== 2016: Relay success in Olympics debut ===
At the Rio Olympics in 2016, Guy won silver in the 4 × 200 m freestyle relay with Stephen Milne, Duncan Scott, and Dan Wallace, and a further silver in the 4 × 100 m medley relay with Chris Walker-Hebborn, Adam Peaty and Duncan Scott. He came fourth in the individual 200 m freestyle event.

=== 2017: World relay gold and transition to butterfly ===
In February 2017 Guy, alongside coach Jol Fincke, moved his training base to the National Centre for Swimming at the University of Bath.

At the 2017 World Aquatics Championships. Guy won gold in the 4 × 200 m freestyle with Duncan Scott, Stephen Milne and Nick Grainger in a time of seven minutes 1.70 seconds. He shared the 100m butterfly bronze with Joseph Schooling of Singapore, both recording a time of 50.83 seconds. In the 4 × 100 m medley relay, he again won silver with the same Olympic line-up of Walker-Hebborn, Peaty and Scott.

=== 2018: Europeans, Commonwealth relay success and final 400 m free ===
At the 2018 Commonwealth Games held at the Gold Coast, Australia, Guy was part of the teams that won silver in the 4 × 200 m freestyle, the 4 × 100 m freestyle, as well as in the 4 × 100 m medley, finishing behind Australia in all three. He also won a silver in the 100 m butterfly, and a bronze on 400 m freestyle, after which he announced that he would no longer swim the 400 metre freestyle event in competition, focusing instead on the 100 metre butterfly.

At the 2018 European Championships, Guy swam the anchor leg in the 4 × 200 metre freestyle relay, and won the gold medal with Duncan Scott, Thomas Dean and Calum Jarvis. The following day he won a second gold as part of the team in the mixed 4 × 100 m medley, then added a third on the final day of the competition by winning as part of the British team the men's 4 × 100 metre medley relay. Individually, he took the bronze medal in the 100 metres butterfly on the final night.

=== 2019: Further World Championships success ===
At the 2019 World Aquatics Championships held in Gwangju, South Korea, Guy won a bronze as part of the GB team in the 4 × 100 m mixed medley relay.

In the men's 4 × 100 metre medley relay, he was part of the team together with Adam Peaty, Duncan Scott and Luke Greenbank. They won the final in a European record time of three minutes, 28.10 seconds, and the win is Britain's first gold medal in the event at the World Championships.

=== 2021: European Championships and Olympic gold ===
At the European Championships held in Budapest in May 2021, Guy won three gold medals as part of the British team in the men's 4 × 100 m medley, mixed 4 × 100 metre medley, and mixed 4 × 200 metre freestyle relays. He also won two silvers in both the men's 4 × 100 metre and 4 × 200 metre freestyle relays, as well as an individual bronze in 100m butterfly.

At the Tokyo Olympics, Guy swam the second leg in the final of the men's 4 × 200 metre freestyle relay, and won his first Olympic gold with Tom Dean, Duncan Scott, and Matt Richards in a time of six minutes 58.58 seconds. He then won a second gold, swimming the butterfly leg in the mixed 4 × 100 metre medley relay, and set a world record time of 3 minutes 37.58 seconds together with Kathleen Dawson, Adam Peaty, and Anna Hopkin.

Guy was appointed Member of the Order of the British Empire (MBE) in the 2022 New Year Honours for services to swimming.

=== 2022 ===
At the 2022 World Aquatics Championships held in Budapest, Guy won two bronzes as part of the team, in Men's 4 × 100 metre medley relay and Men's 4 × 200 metre freestyle relay. In 2022, he was part of the team that won the gold medal in the Men's 4 × 100 metre medley relay at the 2022 Commonwealth Games in Birmingham.

=== 2024: Olympic gold ===
At the 2024 Summer Olympics held in Paris, Guy was in the final of the Men's 4 × 200 metre freestyle relay together with Duncan Scott, Tom Dean, and Matt Richards, the same quartet who won in the same event at the Tokyo Olympics. They won the relay with a time of six minutes and 59.43 seconds, and became the first team to have successfully defended an Olympic swimming relay title with the same four swimmers. They are also the first British team to have defended an Olympic relay title in swimming or athletics.

=== 2025 ===
In 2025, Guy regained the 400 metres freestyle title at the 2025 Aquatics GB Swimming Championships, having previously won the title four years in succession from 2014 to 2017. He also dead-heated with Duncan Scott in the 200 metres freestyle, which sealed a qualification place for the 2025 World Aquatics Championships in Singapore. In Singapore, Guy swam second leg as the British team once more won the gold medal in the 4 × 200 m freestyle, his sixth World title.

== See also ==
- List of Commonwealth Games medallists in swimming (men)
