= Gustaf Dahlman =

Swedish swimmer (born 1997)

Personal information
- Nationality: Swedish
- Born: 3 January 1997 (age 29)

Sport
- Sport: Swimming

Gustaf Dahlman (born 3 January 1997) is a Swedish swimmer. He competed in the men's 200 metre freestyle event at the 2018 FINA World Swimming Championships (25 m), in Hangzhou, China.
