= Mattia Zuin =

Italian swimmer (born 1996)

Personal information
- Nationality: Italian
- Born: 8 March 1996 (age 30)

Sport
- Sport: Swimming
- Strokes: Freestyle
Medal record
European Championships (LC)
Bronze medal – third place	2018 Glasgow	4×200 m freestyle
Mediterranean Games
Gold medal – first place	2018 Tarragona	4×200 m freestyle

Mattia Zuin (born 8 March 1996) is an Italian swimmer.

He competed in the 4×200 m freestyle relay event at the 2018 European Aquatics Championships, winning the bronze medal.
