= Stefano Ballo =

Italian swimmer (born 1993)

Personal information
- Nationality: Italian
- Born: 18 February 1993 (age 33) Bolzano, Italy
- Height: 1.88 m (6 ft 2 in)
- Weight: 83 kg (183 lb)

Sport
- Sport: Swimming
Medal record
Men's swimming
Representing Italy
European Championships (LC)
Silver medal – second place	2020 Budapest	Mixed 4×200 m freestyle
Bronze medal – third place	2020 Budapest	4×200 m freestyle

Stefano Ballo (born 18 February 1993) is an Italian swimmer. He competed in the men's 200 metre freestyle at the 2020 Summer Olympics.
