= Miguel Durán =

Spanish swimmer (born 1995)

Personal information
- Full name: Miguel Durán Navia
- Nationality: Spanish
- Born: 2 September 1995 (age 31)

Sport
- Sport: Swimming
Medal record
Mediterranean Games
Bronze medal – third place	2018 Tarragona	4×200 m freestyle

Miguel Durán Navia (born 2 September 1995) is a Spanish swimmer. He competed in the men's 400 metre freestyle event at the 2016 Summer Olympics.
