= Marc Sánchez =

Spanish swimmer

Personal information
- Born: 6 November 1992 (age 33)

Sport
- Sport: Swimming
Medal record
Representing Spain
Mediterranean Games
Bronze medal – third place	2018 Tarragona	4x200 m freestyle

Marc Sánchez (born 6 November 1992) is a Spanish swimmer. He competed in the men's 4 × 200 metre freestyle relay event at the 2016 Summer Olympics. He is affiliated with Club Natació Sabadell. Sánchez had also claimed a bronze medal at the 2018 Mediterranean Games in Tarragona.
