= Matteo Ciampi =

Italian swimmer (born 1996)

Personal information
- Nationality: Italian
- Born: 3 November 1996 (age 29) Rome, Italy

Sport
- Sport: Swimming
- Strokes: Freestyle
Medal record
Men's swimming
Representing Italy
World Championships (SC)
| Bronze medal – third place | 2022 Melbourne | 4×200 m freestyle |
European Championships (LC)
| Silver medal – second place | 2022 Rome | 4×200 m freestyle |
| Bronze medal – third place | 2018 Glasgow | 4×200 m freestyle |
| Bronze medal – third place | 2020 Budapest | 4×200 m freestyle |
| Bronze medal – third place | 2022 Rome | 4×200 m mixed freestyle |
European Championships (SC)
| Silver medal – second place | 2021 Kazan | 400 m freestyle |
Universiade
| Silver medal – second place | 2019 Naples | 400 m freestyle |
| Silver medal – second place | 2019 Naples | 4×200 m freestyle |
Mediterranean Games
| Gold medal – first place | 2018 Tarragona | 4×200 m freestyle |

Matteo Ciampi (born 3 November 1996) is an Italian swimmer. He competed at the 2020 Summer Olympics in 4 × 200 m freestyle relay.

He competed in the 4 × 200 m freestyle relay event at the 2018 European Aquatics Championships, winning the bronze medal.
