= Stefano Di Cola =

Italian swimmer (born 1998)

Personal information
- Nationality: Italian
- Born: 11 December 1998 (age 27) San Benedetto del Tronto, Italy

Sport
- Sport: Swimming
- Strokes: Freestyle
- Club: G.S. Marina Militare
Medal record
Men's swimming
Representing Italy
European Championships (LC)
Silver medal – second place	2020 Budapest	4×200 m mixed freestyle
Silver medal – second place	2022 Rome	4×200 m freestyle
Bronze medal – third place	2018 Glasgow	4×200 m freestyle
Bronze medal – third place	2020 Budapest	4×200 m freestyle
Bronze medal – third place	2022 Rome	4×200 m mixed freestyle
Mediterranean Games
Gold medal – first place	2018 Tarragona	4×200 m freestyle
Universiade
Silver medal – second place	2019 Naples	4×200 m freestyle
Bronze medal – third place	2019 Naples	200 m freestyle

Stefano Di Cola (born 11 December 1998) is an Italian swimmer. He competed at the 2020 Summer Olympics.

Di Cola is an athlete of the Gruppo Sportivo della Marina Militare.

== Biography ==
He competed in the 4 × 200 m freestyle relay event at the 2018 European Aquatics Championships, winning the bronze medal.
