= Dimitrios Negris =

Greek swimmer

Personal information
- Born: 14 March 1998 (age 28)

Sport
- Sport: Swimming

Dimitrios Negris (born 14 March 1998) is a Greek swimmer. He competed in the men's 1500 metre freestyle event at the 2017 World Aquatics Championships. In 2019, he competed in three events at the 2019 World Aquatics Championships held in Gwangju, South Korea.
