= Poul Zellmann =

German swimmer

Personal information
- Nationality: German
- Born: 2 September 1995 (age 31) Potsdam, Brandenburg, Germany

Sport
- Sport: Swimming
- Strokes: Freestyle
Medal record
Men's swimming
Representing Germany
European Junior Championships
Silver medal – second place	2012 Antwerp	4×200 m freestyle
Bronze medal – third place	2013 Poznań	4×100 m freestyle
Bronze medal – third place	2013 Poznań	4×200 m freestyle

Poul Zellmann (born 2 September 1995) is a German swimmer. He competed in the men's 200 metre freestyle event at the 2017 World Aquatics Championships. In 2019, he competed in two events at the 2019 World Aquatics Championships held in Gwangju, South Korea.
