= Jonathan Atsu =

French swimmer

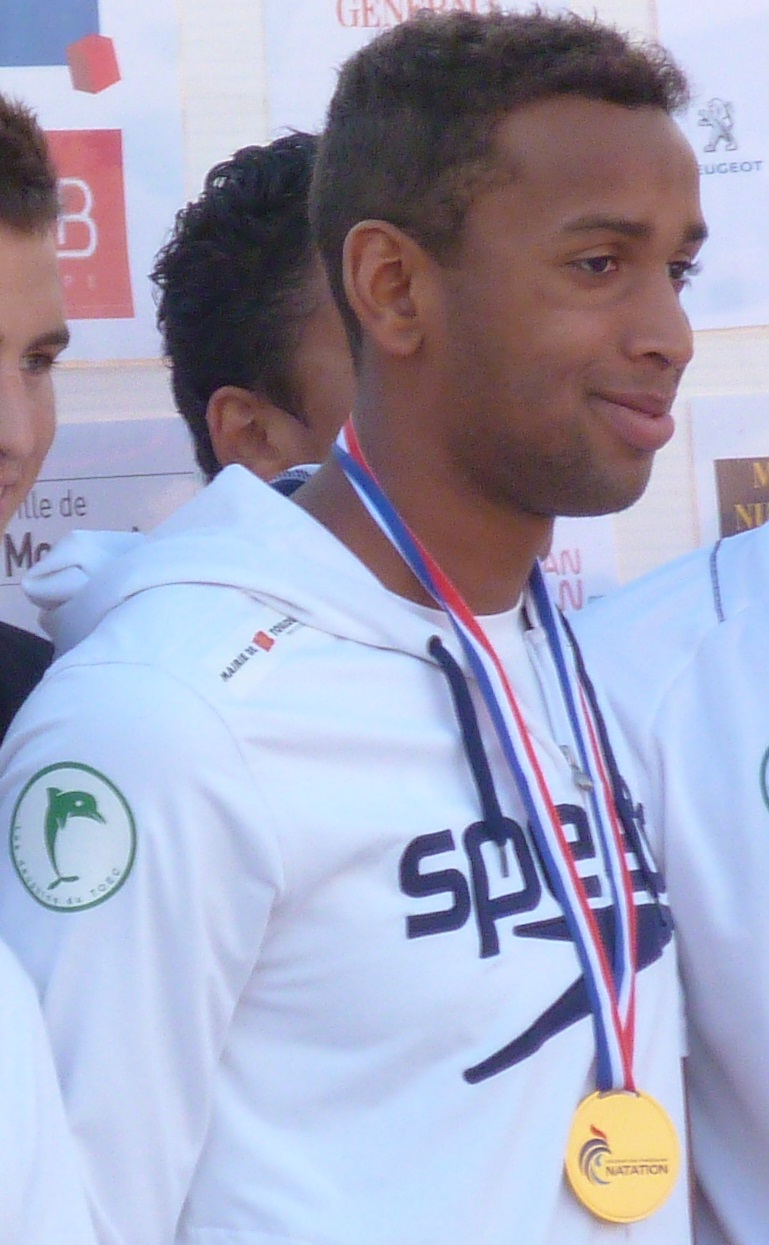
- Atsu in 2015

Personal information
- Nationality: French
- Born: 27 September 1996 (age 30) Carhaix-Plouguer, France

Sport
- Sport: Swimming

Jonathan Atsu (born 27 September 1996) is a French swimmer. He competed in the men's 200 metre freestyle at the 2020 Summer Olympics.
