= Filippo Megli =

Italian swimmer (born 1997)

Personal information
- Nationality: Italian
- Born: 10 May 1997 (age 29) Florence, Italy
- Height: 1.95 m (6 ft 5 in)

Sport
- Sport: Swimming
- Strokes: Freestyle
Medal record
Men's swimming
Representing Italy
World Championships (SC)
Bronze medal – third place	2024 Budapest	4×200 m freestyle
European Championships (LC)
Gold medal – first place	2022 Rome	4×100 m freestyle
Silver medal – second place	2020 Budapest	4×200 m mixed freestyle
Silver medal – second place	2022 Rome	4×200 m freestyle
Bronze medal – third place	2018 Glasgow	4×200 m freestyle
Bronze medal – third place	2020 Budapest	4×200 m freestyle
Bronze medal – third place	2022 Rome	4×200 m mixed freestyle
Mediterranean Games
Gold medal – first place	2022 Oran	100 m freestyle
Gold medal – first place	2022 Oran	200 m freestyle
Gold medal – first place	2022 Oran	4×100 m freestyle
Gold medal – first place	2022 Oran	4×100 m medley
Gold medal – first place	2018 Tarragona	4×200 m freestyle
Silver medal – second place	2018 Tarragona	200 m freestyle

Filippo Megli (born 10 May 1997) is an Italian swimmer. He competed at the 2020 Summer Olympics in 4 × 200 m freestyle relay.

He competed in the men's 200 metre freestyle event at the 2017 World Aquatics Championships.
