= Swimming at the 2022 European Aquatics Championships – Men's 200 metre freestyle =

Men's 200 metre freestyle at the 2022 European Aquatics Championships
- Venue: Foro Italico
- Dates: 14 August (heats and semifinals); 15 August (final)
- Competitors: 46 from 26 nations
- Winning time: 1:42.97 CR

Medalists
gold medal	David Popovici	Romania
silver medal	Antonio Djakovic	Switzerland
bronze medal	Felix Auböck	Austria

The Men's 200 metre freestyle competition of the 2022 European Aquatics Championships was held on 14 and 15 August 2022.

== Records ==
Prior to the competition, the existing world, European and championship records were as follows.

	Name	Nationality	Time	Location	Date
World record	Paul Biedermann	Germany	1:42.00	Rome	28 July 2009
European record	Paul Biedermann	Germany	1:42.00	Rome	28 July 2009
Championship record	Martin Malyutin	Russia	1:44.79	Budapest	21 May 2021

The following new records were set during this competition.

Date	Event	Name	Nationality	Time	Record
15 August	Final	David Popovici	Romania	1:42.97	CR

== Results ==
=== Heats ===
The heats were started on 14 August at 09:00.

Rank	Heat	Lane	Name	Nationality	Time	Notes
1	4	5	Kristóf Milák	Hungary	1:46.26	Q
2	6	4	David Popovici	Romania	1:46.87	Q
3	6	7	Hadrien Salvan	France	1:47.06	Q
4	6	6	Marco De Tullio	Italy	1:47.07	Q
5	5	5	Lukas Märtens	Germany	1:47.24	Q
6	4	2	Stefano Di Cola	Italy	1:47.49	Q
7	6	5	Danas Rapšys	Lithuania	1:47.71	Q
8	6	3	Antonio Djakovic	Switzerland	1:47.78	Q
9	4	4	Felix Auböck	Austria	1:47.97	Q
10	4	3	Nándor Németh	Hungary	1:48.04	Q
11	3	8	Sašo Boškan	Slovenia	1:48.08	Q, NR
12	6	2	Richárd Márton	Hungary	1:48.13	
13	6	0	Dimitrios Markos	Greece	1:48.18	Q
13	5	8	Poul Zellmann	Germany	1:48.18	Q
15	4	8	Luc Kroon	Netherlands	1:48.29	Q
16	3	5	Luis Domínguez	Spain	1:48.34	Q
17	4	7	Filippo Megli	Italy	1:48.40	
18	3	4	Lucas Henveaux	Belgium	1:48.56	Q
19	5	7	Andreas Vazaios	Greece	1:48.71	
20	5	0	Wissam-Amazigh Yebba	France	1:48.81	
21	4	9	Enzo Tesic	France	1:48.89	
22	5	2	Denis Loktev	Israel	1:48.93	
23	5	1	Roman Fuchs	France	1:49.12	
24	4	6	Robin Hanson	Sweden	1:49.20	
25	3	1	Petar Mitsin	Bulgaria	1:49.31	
26	3	6	Andreas Hansen	Denmark	1:49.90	
27	5	9	Bar Soloveychik	Israel	1:50.15	
28	3	2	Dániel Mészáros	Hungary	1:50.60	
29	2	2	Pit Brandenburger	Luxembourg	1:50.62	
30	2	7	Eitan Ben Shitrit	Israel	1:50.63	
31	2	1	Konstantinos Stamou	Greece	1:50.86	
32	3	3	Tomas Navikonis	Lithuania	1:51.02	
33	1	3	Primož Šenica Pavletič	Slovenia	1:51.06	
34	2	9	Marcus Holmquis	Sweden	1:51.09	
35	2	4	Mikkel Gadgaard	Denmark	1:51.12	
36	3	0	Finn McGeever	Ireland	1:51.32	
37	1	5	Vadym Naumenko	Ukraine	1:51.37	
38	2	0	František Jablčník	Slovakia	1:52.05	
39	2	6	Max Mannes	Luxembourg	1:52.34	
40	2	5	Tomas Sungaila	Lithuania	1:52.37	
41	1	4	Luka Kukhalashvili	Georgia	1:53.69	
42	2	8	Robert Powell	Ireland	1:54.25	
43	3	9	Jon Jøntvedt	Norway	1:55.62	
44	1	7	Zhulian Lavdaniti	Albania	1:56.24	
45	1	2	Ado Gargović	Montenegro	1:57.28	
46	1	6	Dylan Cachia	Malta	1:59.84	
	2	3	Edward Mildred	Great Britain	Did not start	
	3	7	Sergio de Celis	Spain	Did not start	
	4	0	Jacob Whittle	Great Britain	Did not start	
	4	1	Lorenzo Galossi	Italy	Did not start	
	5	3	Kregor Zirk	Estonia	Did not start	
	5	4	Tom Dean	Great Britain	Did not start	
	5	6	Matt Richards	Great Britain	Did not start	
	6	1	Nils Liess	Switzerland	Did not start	
	6	8	Roman Mityukov	Switzerland	Did not start	
	6	9	Daniel Namir	Israel	Did not start	

=== Semifinals ===
The semifinals were started on 14 August at 18:11.

Rank	Heat	Lane	Name	Nationality	Time	Notes
1	1	4	David Popovici	Romania	1:44.91	Q
2	1	6	Antonio Djakovic	Switzerland	1:45.32	Q, NR
3	1	5	Marco De Tullio	Italy	1:45.70	Q
4	2	3	Lukas Märtens	Germany	1:46.29	Q
5	1	3	Stefano Di Cola	Italy	1:46.41	Q
6	2	2	Felix Auböck	Austria	1:46.60	Q
7	2	6	Danas Rapšys	Lithuania	1:46.77	Q
8	1	7	Dimitrios Markos	Greece	1:47.12	Q
9	1	2	Nándor Németh	Hungary	1:47.15	
10	2	4	Kristóf Milák	Hungary	1:47.37	
11	2	5	Hadrien Salvan	France	1:47.79	
12	2	1	Poul Zellmann	Germany	1:48.17	
13	2	7	Sašo Boškan	Slovenia	1:48.49	
14	1	1	Luc Kroon	Netherlands	1:48.64	
15	1	8	Lucas Henveaux	Belgium	1:48.96	
16	2	8	Luis Domínguez	Spain	1:49.48	

=== Final ===
The final was held on 15 August at 18:06.

Rank	Lane	Name	Nationality	Time	Notes
1st place, gold medalist(s)	4	David Popovici	Romania	1:42.97	WJ, CR, NR
2nd place, silver medalist(s)	5	Antonio Djakovic	Switzerland	1:45.60	
3rd place, bronze medalist(s)	7	Felix Auböck	Austria	1:45.89	
4	3	Marco De Tullio	Italy	1:46.37	
5	1	Danas Rapšys	Lithuania	1:46.48	
6	2	Stefano Di Cola	Italy	1:46.74	
7	6	Lukas Märtens	Germany	1:46.80	
8	8	Dimitrios Markos	Greece	1:48.05	
