= Swimming at the 2022 European Aquatics Championships – Men's 4 × 200 metre freestyle relay =

Men's 4 × 200 metre freestyle relay at the 2022 European Aquatics Championships
- Venue: Foro Italico
- Dates: 11 August
- Competitors: 47 from 10 nations
- Teams: 10
- Winning time: 7:05.38

Medalists
gold medal	Nándor Németh; Richárd Márton; Balázs Holló; Kristóf Milák; Dániel Mészáros	Hungary
silver medal	Marco De Tullio; Lorenzo Galossi; Gabriele Detti; Stefano Di Cola; Filippo Megli; Matteo Ciampi	Italy
bronze medal	Hadrien Salvan; Wissam-Amazigh Yebba; Enzo Tesic; Roman Fuchs; Mewen Tomac	France

The Men's 4 × 200 metre freestyle relay competition of the 2022 European Aquatics Championships was held on 11 August 2022.

== Records ==
Before the competition, the existing world, European and championship records were as follows.

	Team	Time	Location	Date
World record	United States	6:58.55	Rome	31 July 2009
European record	Great Britain	6:58.58	Tokyo	28 July 2021
Championship record	Russia	7:03.48	Eindhoven	19 May 2021

== Results ==
=== Heats ===
The heats were held at 11:26.

Rank	Lane	Nation	Swimmers	Time	Notes
1	2	Italy	Filippo Megli (1:48.26); Matteo Ciampi (1:47.20); Gabriele Detti (1:46.57); Lorenzo Galossi (1:47.00)	7:09.03	Q
2	6	France	Mewen Tomac (1:48.42); Wissam-Amazigh Yebba (1:46.15); Enzo Tesic (1:47.37); Roman Fuchs (1:47.65)	7:09.59	Q
3	5	Germany	Lukas Märtens (1:47.31); Poul Zellmann (1:47.73); Henning Mühlleitner (1:49.35); Timo Sorgius (1:49.88)	7:14.27	Q
4	0	Switzerland	Antonio Djakovic (1:47.22); Nils Liess (1:48.88); Jérémy Desplanches (1:49.32); Roman Mityukov (1:49.31)	7:14.73	Q
5	9	Israel	Bar Soloveychik (1:49.02); Ron Polonsky (1:48.77); Daniel Namir (1:49.14); Denis Loktev (1:48.78)	7:15.71	Q
6	3	Hungary	Richárd Márton (1:48.57); Dániel Mészáros (1:49.48); Balázs Holló (1:48.12); Nándor Németh (1:49.74)	7:15.91	Q
7	4	Sweden	Robin Hanson (1:49.58); Victor Johansson (1:47.94); Marcus Holmquist (1:49.71); Elias Persson (1:51.25)	7:18.48	Q
8	1	Great Britain	Cameron Kurle (1:50.29); Edward Mildred (1:50.49); Kieran Bird (1:48.05); Jacob Whittle (1:49.78)	7:18.61	Q
9	8	Bulgaria	Antani Ivanov (1:49.00) NR; Petar Mitsin (1:49.08); Kaloyan Levterov (1:51.10); Yordan Yanchev (1:49.65)	7:18.83	NR
10	7	Lithuania	Danas Rapšys (1:48.39); Daniil Pancerevas (1:50.19); Tomas Sungaila (1:51.71); Tomas Navikonis (1:50.75)	7:21.04	NR

=== Final ===
The final was held at 19:04.

Rank	Lane	Nation	Swimmers	Time	Notes
1st place, gold medalist(s)	7	Hungary	Nándor Németh (1:46.28); Richárd Márton (1:47.01); Balázs Holló (1:47.67); Kristóf Milák (1:44.42)	7:05.38	NR
2nd place, silver medalist(s)	4	Italy	Marco De Tullio (1:46.47); Lorenzo Galossi (1:47.91); Gabriele Detti (1:46.51); Stefano Di Cola (1:45.36)	7:06.25	
3rd place, bronze medalist(s)	5	France	Hadrien Salvan (1:46.50); Wissam-Amazigh Yebba (1:45.92); Enzo Tesic (1:47.51); Roman Fuchs (1:47.04)	7:06.97	
4	6	Switzerland	Antonio Djakovic (1:46.10); Nils Liess (1:49.35); Noè Ponti (1:46.42); Roman Mityukov (1:46.39)	7:08.26	
5	2	Israel	Denis Loktev (1:48.78); Daniel Namir (1:48.43); Bar Soloveychik (1:47.53); Ron Polonsky (1:47.24)	7:11.98	
6	8	Great Britain	Matthew Richards (1:48.16); Kieran Bird (1:48.09); Jacob Whittle (1:49.44); Thomas Dean (1:46.69)	7:12.38	
7	3	Germany	Lukas Märtens (1:46.22); Poul Zellmann (1:48.45); Henning Mühlleitner (1:48.92); Timo Sorgius (1:49.99)	7:13.58	
8	1	Sweden	Robin Hanson (1:48.56); Victor Johansson (1:48.56); Marcus Holmquist (1:50.26); Elias Persson (1:51.35)	7:18.73	
