= Swimming at the 2020 European Aquatics Championships – Men's 200 metre freestyle =

2021 swimming competition

Men's 200 metre freestyle at the 2020 European Aquatics Championships
- Venue: Danube Arena
- Dates: 20 May 2021 (heats and semifinals); 21 May 2021 (final)
- Competitors: 76 from 34 nations
- Winning time: 1:44.79

Medalists
| gold medal | Martin Malyutin | Russia |
| silver medal | Duncan Scott | Great Britain |
| bronze medal | Thomas Dean | Great Britain |

The Men's 200 metre freestyle competition of the 2020 European Aquatics Championships was held on 20 and 21 May 2021.

== Records ==
Prior to the competition, the existing world, European and championship records were as follows.

| | Name | Nationality | Time | Location | Date |
|---|---|---|---|---|---|
| World record | Paul Biedermann | Germany | 1:42.00 | Rome | 28 July 2009 |
| European record | Paul Biedermann | Germany | 1:42.00 | Rome | 28 July 2009 |
| Championship record | Pieter van den Hoogenband | Netherlands | 1:44.89 | Berlin | 2 August 2002 |

The following new records were set during this competition.

| Date | Event | Name | Nationality | Time | Record |
|---|---|---|---|---|---|
| 21 May | Final | Martin Malyutin | Russia | 1:44.79 | CR |

== Results ==
=== Heats ===
The heats were started on 20 May at 10:00.

| Rank | Heat | Lane | Name | Nationality | Time | Notes |
|---|---|---|---|---|---|---|
| 1 | 8 | 5 | Martin Malyutin | Russia | 1:46.30 | Q |
| 2 | 8 | 4 | Danas Rapšys | Lithuania | 1:46.85 | Q |
| 3 | 6 | 4 | Thomas Dean | Great Britain | 1:46.88 | Q |
| 4 | 7 | 6 | Kristóf Milák | Hungary | 1:47.27 | Q |
| 5 | 7 | 2 | Antonio Djakovic | Switzerland | 1:47.28 | Q |
| 6 | 8 | 7 | Robin Hanson | Sweden | 1:47.31 | Q |
| 7 | 6 | 5 | Filippo Megli | Italy | 1:47.35 | Q |
| 8 | 7 | 8 | Jordan Pothain | France | 1:47.44 | Q |
| 9 | 7 | 4 | Duncan Scott | Great Britain | 1:47.45 | Q |
| 10 | 8 | 2 | Stefano Ballo | Italy | 1:47.66 | Q |
| 11 | 7 | 5 | Ivan Girev | Russia | 1:47.69 | Q |
| 12 | 8 | 1 | Kregor Zirk | Estonia | 1:47.78 | Q |
| 13 | 7 | 7 | Velimir Stjepanović | Serbia | 1:47.83 | Q |
| 14 | 8 | 0 | Jonathan Atsu | France | 1:47.84 | Q |
| 15 | 6 | 6 | Marco De Tullio | Italy | 1:48.05 | |
| 16 | 7 | 3 | Aleksandr Shchegolev | Russia | 1:48.12 | |
| 17 | 7 | 1 | Nils Liess | Switzerland | 1:48.13 | Q |
| 18 | 6 | 3 | Aleksandr Krasnykh | Russia | 1:48.32 | |
| 19 | 8 | 9 | César Castro | Spain | 1:48.37 | Q |
| 20 | 5 | 1 | David Popovici | Romania | 1:48.38 | NR |
| 21 | 5 | 6 | Alexei Sancov | Moldova | 1:48.42 | |
| 22 | 6 | 1 | Baturalp Ünlü | Turkey | 1:48.44 | |
| 23 | 5 | 4 | Enzo Tesic | France | 1:48.47 | |
| 24 | 7 | 9 | Sebastien De Meulemeester | Belgium | 1:48.48 | |
| 25 | 6 | 0 | Gábor Zombori | Hungary | 1:48.84 | |
| 26 | 5 | 2 | Denis Loktev | Israel | 1:48.97 | |
| 27 | 3 | 4 | Andreas Hansen | Denmark | 1:48.99 | |
| 28 | 8 | 8 | Kacper Majchrzak | Poland | 1:49.14 | |
| 29 | 6 | 9 | Luc Kroon | Netherlands | 1:49.16 | |
| 30 | 5 | 5 | Alexandre Marcourt | Belgium | 1:49.29 | |
| 31 | 4 | 6 | Jan Hołub | Poland | 1:49.39 | |
| 32 | 3 | 5 | Bartosz Piszczorowicz | Poland | 1:49.43 | |
| 33 | 5 | 9 | Mikkel Gadgaard | Denmark | 1:49.53 | |
| 34 | 4 | 0 | Adam Hlobeň | Czech Republic | 1:49.66 | |
| 35 | 4 | 2 | Moritz Berg | Spain | 1:49.76 | |
| 36 | 6 | 8 | Stefano Di Cola | Italy | 1:49.81 | |
| 37 | 5 | 8 | Gal Cohen Groumi | Israel | 1:49.91 | |
| 38 | 8 | 3 | Matthew Richards | Great Britain | 1:50.17 | |
| 39 | 5 | 0 | Daniel Namir | Israel | 1:50.24 | |
| 40 | 4 | 5 | Thomas Thijs | Belgium | 1:50.26 | |
| 41 | 5 | 7 | Roman Fuchs | France | 1:50.41 | |
| 42 | 3 | 2 | Adam Paulsson | Sweden | 1:50.59 | |
| 43 | 4 | 3 | Mario Mollà | Spain | 1:50.68 | |
| 44 | 4 | 8 | Daniil Pancerevas | Lithuania | 1:50.78 | |
| 45 | 2 | 4 | Christoffer Andersen | Denmark | 1:50.88 | |
| 46 | 4 | 4 | Miguel Durán | Spain | 1:50.91 | |
| 47 | 3 | 9 | Tomás Veloso | Portugal | 1:51.10 | |
| 48 | 4 | 7 | Ron Polonsky | Israel | 1:51.27 | |
| 49 | 2 | 1 | Sašo Boškan | Slovenia | 1:51.44 | |
| 50 | 3 | 3 | Jakub Štemberk | Czech Republic | 1:51.65 | |
| 51 | 4 | 1 | Yordan Yanchev | Bulgaria | 1:51.89 | |
| 52 | 3 | 6 | Markus Lie | Norway | 1:51.98 | |
| 52 | 3 | 0 | Max Mannes | Luxembourg | 1:51.98 | |
| 54 | 3 | 8 | Efe Turan | Turkey | 1:52.02 | |
| 55 | 3 | 7 | Pit Brandenburger | Luxembourg | 1:52.14 | |
| 56 | 4 | 9 | Lorenz Weiremans | Belgium | 1:52.15 | |
| 57 | 2 | 6 | Marcus Holmquist | Sweden | 1:52.26 | |
| 58 | 2 | 3 | Doğa Çelik | Turkey | 1:52.34 | |
| 59 | 5 | 3 | Jan Świtkowski | Poland | 1:52.45 | |
| 60 | 2 | 9 | Nikolas Antoniou | Cyprus | 1:52.55 | NR |
| 61 | 2 | 7 | Melikşah Düğen | Turkey | 1:52.66 | |
| 62 | 2 | 5 | Tomas Navikonis | Lithuania | 1:52.76 | |
| 63 | 3 | 1 | Aleksa Bobar | Serbia | 1:53.11 | |
| 64 | 2 | 2 | Jakub Poliačik | Slovakia | 1:53.41 | |
| 65 | 1 | 4 | Ralph Daleiden | Luxembourg | 1:53.71 | |
| 66 | 2 | 8 | Jon Jøntvedt | Norway | 1:53.76 | |
| 67 | 2 | 0 | Irakli Revishvili | Georgia | 1:54.38 | |
| 68 | 1 | 7 | David Abesadze | Georgia | 1:55.20 | |
| 69 | 1 | 2 | Filip Derkoski | North Macedonia | 1:55.67 | |
| 70 | 1 | 9 | Artur Barseghyan | Armenia | 1:56.01 | |
| 71 | 1 | 6 | Ado Gargović | Montenegro | 1:56.45 | |
| 72 | 1 | 3 | Dylan Cachia | Malta | 1:56.81 | |
| 73 | 1 | 5 | Arti Krasniqi | Kosovo | 1:58.03 | |
| 74 | 1 | 0 | Eduard Tshagharyan | Armenia | 1:59.21 | |
| 75 | 1 | 1 | Olt Kondirolli | Kosovo | 2:00.45 | |
| 76 | 1 | 8 | Paolo Priska | Albania | 2:05.14 | |
| | 6 | 2 | Nándor Németh | Hungary | Did not start | |
| | 6 | 7 | Roman Mityukov | Switzerland | Did not start | |
| | 7 | 0 | Balázs Holló | Hungary | Did not start | |
| | 8 | 6 | James Guy | Great Britain | Did not start | |

=== Semifinals ===
The semifinals were started on 20 May at 18:20.

==== Semifinal 1 ====
| Rank | Lane | Name | Nationality | Time | Notes |
|---|---|---|---|---|---|
| 1 | 4 | Danas Rapšys | Lithuania | 1:46.19 | Q |
| 2 | 3 | Robin Hanson | Sweden | 1:46.50 | Q, NR |
| 3 | 5 | Kristóf Milák | Hungary | 1:46.77 | q |
| 4 | 2 | Stefano Ballo | Italy | 1:47.10 | |
| 5 | 7 | Kregor Zirk | Estonia | 1:47.16 | |
| 6 | 8 | César Castro | Spain | 1:47.18 | |
| 7 | 6 | Jordan Pothain | France | 1:47.60 | |
| 8 | 1 | Jonathan Atsu | France | 1:48.07 | |

==== Semifinal 2 ====
| Rank | Lane | Name | Nationality | Time | Notes |
|---|---|---|---|---|---|
| 1 | 4 | Martin Malyutin | Russia | 1:45.60 | Q |
| 2 | 2 | Duncan Scott | Great Britain | 1:46.15 | Q |
| 3 | 5 | Thomas Dean | Great Britain | 1:46.17 | q |
| 4 | 3 | Antonio Djakovic | Switzerland | 1:46.26 | q |
| 5 | 1 | Velimir Stjepanović | Serbia | 1:47.08 | q |
| 6 | 8 | Nils Liess | Switzerland | 1:47.16 | |
| 7 | 6 | Filippo Megli | Italy | 1:47.74 | |
| 8 | 7 | Ivan Girev | Russia | 1:47.95 | |

=== Final ===
The final was held on 21 May at 19:28.

| Rank | Lane | Name | Nationality | Time | Notes |
|---|---|---|---|---|---|
| 1st place, gold medalist(s) | 4 | Martin Malyutin | Russia | 1:44.79 | CR |
| 2nd place, silver medalist(s) | 5 | Duncan Scott | Great Britain | 1:45.19 | |
| 3rd place, bronze medalist(s) | 3 | Thomas Dean | Great Britain | 1:45.34 | |
| 4 | 6 | Danas Rapšys | Lithuania | 1:45.72 | |
| 5 | 1 | Kristóf Milák | Hungary | 1:45.74 | |
| 6 | 2 | Antonio Djakovic | Switzerland | 1:46.10 | |
| 7 | 7 | Robin Hanson | Sweden | 1:47.34 | |
| 8 | 8 | Velimir Stjepanović | Serbia | 1:47.66 | |
