= Swimming at the 2023 World Aquatics Championships – Men's 4 × 200 metre freestyle relay =

Men's 4 × 200 metre freestyle relay at the 2023 World Aquatics Championships
- Venue: Marine Messe Fukuoka
- Location: Fukuoka, Japan
- Dates: 28 July (heats and final)
- Competitors: 75 from 17 nations
- Teams: 17
- Winning time: 6:59.08

Medalists
gold medal	Duncan Scott; Matthew Richards; James Guy; Tom Dean; Joe Litchfield	Great Britain
silver medal	Luke Hobson; Carson Foster; Jake Mitchell; Kieran Smith; Drew Kibler; Baylor Nelson; Henry McFadden	United States
bronze medal	Kai Taylor; Kyle Chalmers; Alexander Graham; Thomas Neill; Flynn Southam; Elijah Winnington	Australia

The men's 4 × 200 metre freestyle relay competition at the 2023 World Aquatics Championships was held on 28 July 2023.

== Records ==
Prior to the competition, the existing world and championship records were as follows.

World record	United States; Michael Phelps (1:44.49); Ricky Berens (1:44.13); David Walters (1:45.47); Ryan Lochte (1:44.46)	6:58.55	Rome, Italy	31 July 2009
Competition record	United States; Michael Phelps (1:44.49); Ricky Berens (1:44.13); David Walters (1:45.47); Ryan Lochte (1:44.46)	6:58.55	Rome, Italy	31 July 2009

== Results ==
=== Heats ===
The heats started at 11:55.

Rank	Heat	Lane	Nation	Swimmers	Time	Notes
1	1	4	Australia	Flynn Southam (1:47.85); Elijah Winnington (1:46.27); Kai Taylor (1:44.56); Thomas Neill (1:45.69)	7:04.37	Q
2	2	4	United States	Drew Kibler (1:46.44); Baylor Nelson (1:47.13); Henry McFadden (1:46.39); Jake Mitchell (1:46.11)	7:06.12	Q
3	1	3	Italy	Marco De Tullio (1:47.77); Matteo Ciampi (1:46.89); Filippo Megli (1:45.62); Stefano Di Cola (1:45.84)	7:06.12	Q
4	2	5	Great Britain	Joe Litchfield (1:47.14); Duncan Scott (1:46.21); Tom Dean (1:46.85); Matthew Richards (1:46.00)	7:06.20	Q
5	1	6	France	Hadrien Salvan (1:47.03); Wissam-Amazigh Yebba (1:45.70); Roman Fuchs (1:47.09); Enzo Tesic (1:46.58)	7:06.40	Q
6	2	6	South Korea	Hwang Sun-woo (1:47.29); Kim Woo-min (1:46.02); Yang Jae-hoon (1:47.31); Lee Ho-joon (1:46.20)	7:06.82	Q, NR
7	2	1	Germany	Lukas Martens (1:45.60); Rafael Miroslaw (1:46.74); Josha Salchow (1:47.39); Timo Sorgius (1:47.77)	7:07.50	Q
8	1	5	Brazil	Luiz Altamir Melo (1:47.73); Fernando Scheffer (1:47.12); Murilo Sartori (1:46.57); Guilherme Costa (1:46.32)	7:07.74	Q
9	2	8	Japan	Hidenari Mano (1:47.25); Katsuhiro Matsumoto (1:45.60); Taikan Tanaka (1:48.23); Fuyu Yoshida (1:47.62)	7:08.70	
10	2	7	Israel	Denis Loktev (1:47.38); Tomer Frankel (1:48.39); Daniel Namir (1:47.19); Gal Cohen Groumi (1:46.82)	7:09.78	
11	1	2	China	Ji Xinjie (1:47.29); Hong Jinquan (1:47.69); Zhang Ziyang (1:48.46); Wang Haoyu (1:46.44)	7:09.99	
12	1	7	Canada	Ruslan Gaziev (1:47.73); Patrick Hussey (1:48.33); Finlay Knox (1:47.57); Javier Acevedo (1:47.04)	7:10.67	
13	1	8	Spain	Cesar Castro (1:47.35); Luis Dominguez (1:46.97); Sergio De Celis (1:47.74); Carlos Quijada (1:48.79)	7:10.85	NR
14	2	2	Switzerland	Antonio Djakovic (1:46.37); Roman Mityukov (1:48.53); Noe Ponti (1:46.79); Nils Liess (1:49.18)	7:10.87	
15	2	3	Hungary	Nándor Németh (1:47.98); Richárd Márton (1:48.63); Balázs Holló (1:47.18); Kristóf Rasovszky (1:47.78)	7:11.57	
16	2	0	Thailand	Dulyawat Kaewsriyong (1:53.44); Tonnam Kanteemool (1:53.40); Ratthawit Thammananthachote (1:54.80); Navaphat Wongcharoen (1:57.64)	7:39.28	
17	1	1	Vietnam	Do Ngoc Vinh (1:53.65); Nguyễn Hữu Kim Sơn (1:55.04); Mai Tran Tuan Anh (1:57.64); Nguyen Quang Thuan (1:58.00)	7:44.33	

=== Final ===
The final was held at 21:40.

Rank	Lane	Nation	Swimmers	Time	Notes
1st place, gold medalist(s)	6	Great Britain	Duncan Scott (1:45.42); Matthew Richards (1:44.65); James Guy (1:45.17); Tom Dean (1:43.84)	6:59.08	
2nd place, silver medalist(s)	5	United States	Luke Hobson (1:46.00); Carson Foster (1:44.49); Jake Mitchell (1:45.06); Kieran Smith (1:44.47)	7:00.02	
3rd place, bronze medalist(s)	4	Australia	Kai Taylor (1:45.79); Kyle Chalmers (1:45.19); Alexander Graham (1:45.55); Thomas Neill (1:45.60)	7:02.13	
4	2	France	Hadrien Salvan (1:46.73); Wissam-Amazigh Yebba (1:45.54); Enzo Tesic (1:46.70); Léon Marchand (1:44.89)	7:03.86	
5	3	Italy	Marco De Tullio (1:47.43); Filippo Megli (1:44.94); Matteo Ciampi (1:46.03); Stefano Di Cola (1:45.55)	7:03.95	
6	7	South Korea	Hwang Sun-woo (1:46.35); Kim Woo-min (1:44.84); Yang Jae-hoon (1:48.35); Lee Ho-joon (1:44.53)	7:04.07	NR
7	1	Germany	Lukas Martens (1:44.79); Rafael Miroslaw (1:45.79); Josha Salchow (1:47.35); Timo Sorgius (1:48.21)	7:06.14	
8	8	Brazil	Murilo Sartori (1:46.70); Guilherme Costa (1:46.05); Fernando Scheffer (1:46.96); Luiz Altamir Melo (1:46.72)	7:06.43	
