= List of textile best times in swimming =

Many of the world records in swimming were established by swimmers wearing bodysuits or suits made of polyurethane or other non-textile materials allowed in the race pool from February 2008 until December 2009. These suits seemed to improve the performance for top athletes, especially those with larger physiques. The times shown below are the fastest in the world set by swimmers wearing suits made of textile materials.

== Long course ==
=== Men ===
Event	Time		Name	Nationality	Date	Meet	Location	Ref
200 m freestyle	1:42.97	+0.97	David Popovici	Romania	15 August 2022	European Championships	Rome, Italy	
800 m freestyle	7:36.73	+4.61	Samuel Short	Australia	10 June 2026	Australian Trials	Sydney, Australia	
200 m backstroke	1:52.30	+0.38, sf	Hubert Kós	Hungary	11 August 2026	European Championships	Paris, France	
4 × 100 m freestyle relay	3:08.97	+0.73	Caeleb Dressel (47.26); Blake Pieroni (47.58); Bowe Becker (47.44); Zach Apple (46.69)	United States	26 July 2021	Olympic Games	Tokyo, Japan	
4 × 100 m freestyle relay	3:08.97	+0.73	Flynn Southam (47.77); Kai Taylor (47.04); Maximillian Giuliani (47.63); Kyle Chalmers (46.53)	Australia	27 July 2025	World Championships	Singapore, Singapore	
4 × 200 m freestyle relay	6:58.58	+0.03	Tom Dean (1:45.72); James Guy (1:44.40); Matthew Richards (1:45.01); Duncan Scott (1:43.45)	Great Britain	28 July 2021	Olympic Games	Tokyo, Japan	

Legend: # – Record awaiting ratification by World Aquatics; e – equalled existing record;
Records not set in finals: h – heat; sf – semifinal; r – relay 1st leg; rh – relay heat 1st leg; b – B final; † – en route to final mark; so – swim-off; tt – time trial

=== Women ===
All women textile best times are also world records.

=== Mixed relay ===
All mixed relays textile best times are also world records.

== Short course ==
All textile best short course times are also world records.

=== Men's 4 × 50 m freestyle relay ===
For the men's 4 × 50 m freestyle relay, the fastest time ever recorded (1:20.77 by France in 2008) is not the official world record. The event was not officially recognized by World Aquatics as a world record event at that time. The French performance is still recognized as the European record, while the official world record is held by the United States.

Event	Time		Name	Nationality	Date	Meet	Location	Ref
4 × 50 m freestyle relay	1:21.80	+1.03	Caeleb Dressel (20.43); Ryan Held (20.25); Jack Conger (20.59); Michael Chadwick (20.53)	United States	14 December 2018	World Championships	Hangzhou, China	

Legend: # – Record awaiting ratification by World Aquatics; e – equalled existing record;
Records not set in finals: h – heat; so – swim-off
