= Swimming at the 2026 Commonwealth Games – Mixed 4 × 100 metre freestyle relay =

Mixed 4 × 100 metre freestyle relay at the 2026 Commonwealth Games
- Venue: Tollcross International Swimming Centre
- Dates: 25 July
- Nations: 20
- Winning time: 3:19.36 GR

Medalists
gold medal	Flynn Southam; Kyle Chalmers; Shayna Jack; Meg Harris; Kai Taylor; Harrison Turner; Hannah Casey; Alex Perkins	Australia
silver medal	Jacob Mills; Jacob Whittle; Freya Anderson; Freya Colbert; Gabriel Shephard; Tom Dean; Abbie Wood; Erin Little	England
bronze medal	Matt Richards; Dan Jones; Bex Sutton; Theodora Taylor; Harry Milne; Kieran Bird; Medi Harris; Meghan Higgs	Wales

The mixed 4 × 100 metre freestyle relay event at the 2026 Commonwealth Games will be held on 25 July at the Tollcross International Swimming Centre. 20 nations entered a team.

== Schedule ==
The schedule is as follows:

All times are British Summer Time (UTC+1)

Date	Time	Round
Saturday 25 July 2026	10:30	Heats
Saturday 25 July 2026	19:00	Final

== Results ==
=== Heats ===
The heats will be held on the morning of 25 July 2026.

Heat results
Rank	Heat	Lane	Nation	Swimmers	Time	Notes
1	2	5	Australia		3:24.83	Q
2	2	4	England		3:26.56	Q
3	3	5	New Zealand		3:28.19	Q
4	2	3	Wales		3:31.46	Q
5	3	3	Scotland		3:31.79	Q
6	2	7	Uganda		3:37.11	Q
7	2	6	Cayman Islands		3:37.90	Q
8	1	2	Isle of Man		3:39.22	Q
9	1	7	Kenya		3:42.79	R
10	3	7	Jamaica		3:43.07	R
11	1	6	Samoa		3:45.13	NR
12	2	8	Jersey		3:45.26	
13	3	8	Cook Islands		3:45.81	
14	2	1	Guernsey		3:46.15	
15	3	1	Ghana		3:53.60	
16	1	3	Seychelles		3:57.35	
17	1	4	Papua New Guinea		3:57.71	
18	1	5	Maldives		4:00.64	NR
	3	2	Bahamas			DNS
	3	4	Canada			DNS
	3	6	South Africa			DNS

=== Final ===
The final took place during of the evening of 25 July 2026.

Final results
Rank	Lane	Nation	Swimmers	Time	Notes
1st place, gold medalist(s)	4	Australia	Flynn Southam (47.29); Kyle Chalmers (47.62); Shayna Jack (52.42); Meg Harris (52.03)	3:19.36	GR
2nd place, silver medalist(s)	5	England	Jacob Mills (48.22); Jacob Whittle (48.25); Freya Anderson (53.98); Freya Colbert (53.46)	3:23.91	
3rd place, bronze medalist(s)	6	Wales	Matt Richards (47.62); Dan Jones (49.17); Bex Sutton (54.91); Theodora Taylor (52.63)	3:24.33	
4	3	New Zealand	Carter Swift (48.67); Cameron Gray (48.33); Chelsey Edwards (54.23); Erika Fairweather (53.59)	3:24.82	
5	2	Scotland	Evan Jones (49.41); Duncan Scott (47.66); Evelyn Davis (53.96); Katie Shanahan (55.17)	3:26.20	
6	1	Cayman Islands	James Allison (49.56); Daniel Kish (51.49); Kyra Rabess (57.00); Sierrah Broadbelt (58.13)	3:36.18	NR
7	7	Uganda	Tendo Kaumi (51.34); Jesse Ssengonzi (52.67); Gloria Muzito (54.95); Namutebi Kirabo (58.18)	3:37.14	
8	8	Isle of Man	Joel Watterson (51.12); Harry Robinson (50.69); Ella Justice (56.38); Kiera Prentice (1:00.46)	3:38.65	
