= Swimming at the 2025 World Aquatics Championships – Men's 4 × 100 metre freestyle relay =

Men's 4 × 100 metre freestyle relay at the 2025 World Aquatics Championships
- Venue: World Aquatics Championships Arena
- Location: Singapore Sports Hub, Kallang
- Dates: 27 July
- Competitors: 86 from 20 nations
- Teams: 20
- Winning time: 3:08.97

Medalists
gold medal	Flynn Southam; Kai Taylor; Maximillian Giuliani; Kyle Chalmers	Australia
silver medal	Carlos D'Ambrosio; Thomas Ceccon; Lorenzo Zazzeri; Manuel Frigo; Leonardo Deplano	Italy
bronze medal	Jack Alexy; Patrick Sammon; Chris Guiliano; Jonny Kulow; Shaine Casas; Destin Lasco	United States

The men's 4 × 100 metre freestyle relay at the 2025 World Aquatics Championships was held on 27 July 2025 at the World Aquatics Championships Arena at the Singapore Sports Hub in Kallang, Singapore.

== Background ==
The United States, Australia, and Italy have consistently medalled in recent years, while China will attempt to challenge again after winning the event at the 2024 World Championships. The United States will likely field Jack Alexy, who swam 46.99 at US Nationals, and Patrick Sammon, who recorded 47.47, alongside Chris Guiliano, Destin Lasco, Jonny Kulow, and Shaine Casas; their aggregate times suggest they could approach 3:08. Australia, led by Kyle Chalmers, who swam 47.27 in April, will also likely include Flynn Southam, Kai Taylor, and Maximilian Giuliani. Italy will rely on Manuel Frigo, Thomas Ceccon, Carlos D’Ambrosio, and likely Lorenzo Zazzeri. China, with Pan Zhanle capable of 45-second relay splits, could also contend for gold.

== Qualification ==
Each National Federation could enter one team in the relay. The team had to be composed of swimmers who were also competing in the individual events, along with relay only swimmers who had to have met a specific qualifying time for the corresponding stroke and distance they would be swimming in the relay. Federations were only allowed to enter two relay-only swimmers for each relay they entered, though they could also enter relay-only swimmers from other relays which did not count toward this limitation.

== Records ==
Prior to the competition, the existing world and championship records were as follows.

World record	United States; Michael Phelps (47.51); Garrett Weber-Gale (47.02); Cullen Jones (47.65); Jason Lezak (46.06)	3:08.24	Beijing, China	11 August 2008
Competition record	United States; Caeleb Dressel (47.63); Blake Pieroni (47.49); Zach Apple (46.86); Nathan Adrian (47.08)	3:09.06	Gwangju, South Korea	21 July 2019

The following record was established during the competition:

Date	Event	Nation	Swimmers	Time	Record
27 July	Final	Australia	Flynn Southam (47.77); Kai Taylor (47.04); Maximillian Giuliani (47.63); Kyle Chalmers (46.53)	3:08.97	CR

== Heats ==
The heats took place on 27 July at 12:45.

Rank	Heat	Lane	Nation	Swimmers	Time	Notes
1	3	4	United States	Shaine Casas (48.58); Jonny Kulow (47.51); Destin Lasco (47.60); Patrick Sammon (47.48)	3:11.17	Q
2	2	4	Australia	Flynn Southam (48.12); Kai Taylor (47.55); Maximillian Giuliani (48.08); Kyle Chalmers (47.54)	3:11.29	Q
3	3	5	Italy	Carlos D'Ambrosio (47.96); Lorenzo Zazzeri (47.63); Leonardo Deplano (48.29); Manuel Frigo (48.14)	3:12.02	Q
4	2	5	China	Chen Juner (48.56); Wang Haoyu (47.59); Liu Wudi (48.38); Pan Zhanle (47.73)	3:12.26	Q
5	2	3	Canada	Ruslan Gaziev (48.75); Joshua Liendo (47.26); Antoine Sauve (48.37); Filip Senc-Samardzic (48.26)	3:12.64	Q
6	3	3	Great Britain	Jacob Mills (48.34); Duncan Scott (47.56); Jacob Whittle (48.11); Tom Dean (48.68)	3:12.69	Q
7	3	2	Hungary	Nándor Németh (47.87); Hubert Kós (47.71); Dániel Mészáros (48.56); Ádám Jászó (48.57)	3:12.71	Q
8	2	8	Lithuania	Tajus Juska (48.60); Tomas Navikonis (47.47); Tomas Lukminas (47.83); Danas Rapšys (48.84)	3:12.74	Q, NR
9	1	3	Neutral Athlete B	Kliment Kolesnikov (48.59); Vladislav Grinev (48.00); Ivan Girev (47.90); Vasilii Kukushkin (48.38)	3:12.87	
10	3	6	Germany	Josha Salchow (48.21); Rafael Miroslaw (48.32); Kaii Winkler (47.52); Luca Armbruster (48.84)	3:12.89	
11	3	1	France	Rafael Fente-Damers (48.58); Nans Mazellier (48.52); Ethan Dumesnil (48.27); Yann Le Goff (47.55)	3:12.92	
12	2	1	Israel	Alexey Glivinsky (48.72); Denis Loktev (48.12); Daniel Krichevsky (48.01); Martin Kartavi (48.54)	3:13.39	NR
13	3	7	Poland	Kamil Sieradzki (48.39); Jakub Majerski (48.16); Ksawery Masiuk (47.48); Karol Ostrowski (49.57)	3:13.60	
14	2	7	Croatia	Jere Hribar (47.93 NR); Nikola Miljenić (48.57); Vlaho Nenadić (48.82); Toni Dragoja (48.70)	3:14.02	
15	2	6	Serbia	Nikola Aćin (48.78); Velimir Stjepanović (48.10); Luka Jovanović (49.16); Justin Cvetkov (48.07)	3:14.11	
16	2	2	Spain	Sergio de Celis (48.24 NR); Luca Hoek Le Guenedal (47.68); Miguel Pérez-Godoy (48.86); Nacho Campos Beas (49.56)	3:14.34	
17	3	0	Norway	Sander Sorensen (48.73 NR); Markus Lie (49.10); Jakob Harlem (49.84); Bjørnar Laskerud (48.99)	3:16.66	NR
18	2	0	Singapore	Ardi Azman (50.03); Mikkel Lee (48.91); Jonathan Tan (48.94); Glen Lim (50.50)	3:18.38	
19	1	4	Mexico	Andres Dupont (48.48); Jorge Iga (48.37); Marcus Reyes-Gentry (50.36); Héctor Ruvalcaba (51.60)	3:18.81	
20	3	8	Luxembourg	Ralph Daleiden (48.60 NR); Remi Fabiani (49.37); João Carneiro (51.86); Julien Henx (51.56)	3:21.39	
—	1	5	Kenya	Did not start		

== Final ==
The final took place at 10:51.

Rank	Lane	Nation	Swimmers	Time	Notes
1st place, gold medalist(s)	5	Australia	Flynn Southam (47.77); Kai Taylor (47.04); Maximillian Giuliani (47.63); Kyle Chalmers (46.53)	3:08.97	CR, OC
2nd place, silver medalist(s)	3	Italy	Carlos D'Ambrosio (47.78); Thomas Ceccon (47.10); Lorenzo Zazzeri (47.36); Manuel Frigo (47.34)	3:09.58	NR
3rd place, bronze medalist(s)	4	United States	Jack Alexy (47.24); Patrick Sammon (47.03); Chris Guiliano (47.43); Jonny Kulow (47.94)	3:09.64	
4	7	Great Britain	Jacob Mills (48.51); Matthew Richards (47.32); Jacob Whittle (47.67); Duncan Scott (47.23)	3:10.73	NR
5	6	China	Chen Juner (48.58); Wang Haoyu (47.91); Liu Wudi (48.03); Pan Zhanle (46.63)	3:11.15	
6	1	Hungary	Nandor Nemeth (47.89); Szebasztián Szabó (48.11); Dániel Mészáros (48.48); Adam Jaszo (48.27)	3:12.75	
7	8	Lithuania	Tomas Navikonis (48.37); Tomas Lukminas (47.89); Tajus Juska (48.26); Danas Rapšys (48.32)	3:12.84	
8	2	Canada	Ruslan Gaziev (48.37); Joshua Liendo (47.08); Antoine Sauve (48.18); Filip Senc-Samardzic (49.26)	3:12.89	
