= Swimming at the 2022 World Aquatics Championships – Men's 4 × 200 metre freestyle relay =

Men's 4 × 200 metre freestyle relay at the 2022 World Aquatics Championships
- Venue: Danube Arena
- Location: Budapest, Hungary
- Dates: 23 June (heats and final)
- Competitors: 61 from 14 nations
- Teams: 14
- Winning time: 7:00.24

Medalists
gold medal	Drew Kibler; Carson Foster; Trenton Julian; Kieran Smith; Trey Freeman; Coby Carrozza	United States
silver medal	Elijah Winnington; Zac Incerti; Samuel Short; Mack Horton; Brendon Smith	Australia
bronze medal	James Guy; Jacob Whittle; Joe Litchfield; Tom Dean; Matthew Richards	Great Britain

The Men's 4 × 200 metre freestyle relay competition at the 2022 World Aquatics Championships was held on 23 June 2022.

== Records ==
Prior to the competition, the existing world and championship records were as follows.

World record	United States	6:58.55	Rome, Italy	31 July 2009
Competition record	United States	6:58.55	Rome, Italy	31 July 2009

== Results ==
=== Heats ===
The heats started at 10:13.

Rank	Heat	Lane	Nation	Swimmers	Time	Notes
1	2	5	United States	Carson Foster (1:45.62); Trey Freeman (1:46.91); Coby Carrozza (1:46.22); Trenton Julian (1:45.64)	7:04.39	Q
2	2	6	Brazil	Fernando Scheffer (1:46.33); Vinicius Assunção (1:46.81); Murilo Sartori (1:47.11); Breno Correia (1:46.73)	7:06.98	Q, SA
3	1	3	Hungary	Richárd Márton (1:46.52); Nándor Németh (1:47.17); Balázs Holló (1:47.03); Kristóf Milák (1:46.74)	7:07.46	Q
4	1	2	South Korea	Hwang Sun-woo (1:46.42); Kim Woo-min (1:46.65); Lee Yoo-yeon (1:48.04); Lee Ho-joon (1:47.38)	7:08.49	Q, NR
5	1	6	China	Hong Jinquan (1:47.54); Zhang Ziyang (1:47.34); Chen Juner (1:48.45); Pan Zhanle (1:46.20)	7:09.53	Q
6	2	4	Great Britain	Tom Dean (1:46.71); Matthew Richards (1:48.21); Joe Litchfield (1:47.36); Jacob Whittle (1:47.48)	7:09.76	Q
7	2	3	France	Jordan Pothain (1:47.99); Hadrien Salvan (1:46.55); Roman Fuchs (1:46.97); Enzo Tesic (1:48.44)	7:09.95	Q
8	1	4	Australia	Brendon Smith (1:49.14); Zac Incerti (1:46.44); Samuel Short (1:46.97); Mack Horton (1:47.43)	7:09.98	Q
9	1	5	Italy	Stefano Ballo (1:47.63); Matteo Ciampi (1:47.27); Gabriele Detti (1:47.89); Stefano Di Cola (1:47.37)	7:10.16	
10	2	2	Israel	Denis Loktev (1:48.74); Bar Soloveychik (1:48.53); Daniel Namir (1:47.55); Gal Cohen Groumi (1:47.88)	7:12.70	
11	2	1	Canada	Ruslan Gaziev (1:48.57); Finlay Knox (1:48.48); Jeremy Bagshaw (1:49.23); Patrick Hussey (1:52.06)	7:18.34	
12	2	7	Singapore	Glen Lim Jun Wei (1:50.64); Ardi Mohamed Azman (1:49.69); Jonathan Tan (1:51.31); Quah Zheng Wen (1:48.67)	7:20.31	
13	1	1	Vietnam	Trần Hưng Nguyên (1:51.27); Nguyễn Hữu Kim Sơn (1:52.86); Hoàng Quý Phước (1:50.79); Nguyễn Huy Hoàng (1:54.82)	7:29.74	
14	1	7	Thailand	Tonnam Kanteemool (1:52.01); Dulyawat Kaewsriyong (1:54.33); Ratthawit Thammananthachote (1:57.29); Navaphat Wongcharoen (1:56.64)	7:40.27	

=== Final ===
The final started at 19:37.

Rank	Lane	Nation	Swimmers	Time	Notes
1st place, gold medalist(s)	4	United States	Drew Kibler (1:45.54); Carson Foster (1:45.04); Trenton Julian (1:45.31); Kieran Smith (1:44.35)	7:00.24	
2nd place, silver medalist(s)	8	Australia	Elijah Winnington (1:45.83); Zac Incerti (1:45.51); Samuel Short (1:46.44); Mack Horton (1:45.72)	7:03.50	
3rd place, bronze medalist(s)	7	Great Britain	James Guy (1:46.31); Jacob Whittle (1:46.80); Joe Litchfield (1:47.36); Tom Dean (1:43.53)	7:04.00	
4	5	Brazil	Fernando Scheffer (1:45.52); Vinicius Assunção (1:46.44); Murilo Sartori (1:46.34); Breno Correia (1:46.39)	7:04.69	SA
5	3	Hungary	Richárd Márton (1:48.12); Nándor Németh (1:45.73); Balázs Holló (1:47.74); Kristóf Milák (1:44.68)	7:06.27	
6	6	South Korea	Hwang Sun-woo (1:45.30); Kim Woo-min (1:46.57); Lee Yoo-yeon (1:48.28); Lee Ho-joon (1:46.78)	7:06.93	NR
7	1	France	Jordan Pothain (1:48.41); Léon Marchand (1:47.59); Roman Fuchs (1:46.27); Hadrien Salvan (1:46.51)	7:08.78	
8	2	China	Hong Jinquan (1:47.74); Zhang Ziyang (1:47.95); Chen Juner (1:49.53); Pan Zhanle (1:45.71)	7:10.93	
