= Swimming at the 2020 European Aquatics Championships – Men's 400 metre freestyle =

Men's 400 metre freestyle at the 2020 European Aquatics Championships
- Venue: Danube Arena
- Dates: 17 May 2021
- Competitors: 49 from 29 nations
- Winning time: 3:44.18

Medalists
gold medal	Martin Malyutin	Russia
silver medal	Felix Auböck	Austria
bronze medal	Danas Rapšys	Lithuania

The Men's 400 metre freestyle competition of the 2020 European Aquatics Championships was held on 17 May 2021.

== Records ==
Before the competition, the existing world, European and championship records were as follows.

	Name	Nationality	Time	Location	Date
World record European record	Paul Biedermann	Germany	3:40.07	Rome	26 July 2009
Championship record	Gabriele Detti	Italy	3:44.01	London	16 May 2016

== Results ==
=== Heats ===
The heats were started at 10:14.

Rank	Heat	Lane	Name	Nationality	Time	Notes
1	4	7	Antonio Djakovic	Switzerland	3:47.23	Q
2	4	2	Henrik Christiansen	Norway	3:47.51	Q
3	5	4	Gabriele Detti	Italy	3:47.56	Q
4	5	5	Felix Auböck	Austria	3:47.61	Q
5	4	5	Marco De Tullio	Italy	3:47.81	Q
6	4	3	Martin Malyutin	Russia	3:47.95	Q
7	4	4	Danas Rapšys	Lithuania	3:48.05	Q
8	3	1	Kregor Zirk	Estonia	3:48.39	Q, NR
9	3	8	Max Litchfield	Great Britain	3:48.41	
10	5	7	Matteo Ciampi	Italy	3:48.57	
11	4	8	Konstantinos Englezakis	Greece	3:48.59	NR
12	4	6	Gábor Zombori	Hungary	3:48.88	
13	2	5	Dimitrios Markos	Greece	3:49.22	
14	5	2	Aleksandr Egorov	Russia	3:49.42	
15	2	3	Mikkel Gadgaard	Denmark	3:49.93	
16	4	0	Balázs Holló	Hungary	3:50.06	
17	5	1	Joris Bouchaut	France	3:50.48	
18	3	7	Yiğit Aslan	Turkey	3:50.59	
19	5	3	Alexander Krasnykh	Russia	3:50.77	
20	4	1	Kristóf Milák	Hungary	3:51.59	
21	3	5	Yordan Yanchev	Bulgaria	3:51.79	
22	3	9	Martin Bau	Slovenia	3:51.89	
23	2	6	Christoffer Andersen	Denmark	3:52.29	
24	3	6	Luc Kroon	Netherlands	3:52.93	
25	5	6	Kieran Bird	Great Britain	3:53.97	
26	4	9	Ákos Kalmár	Hungary	3:54.18	
27	3	3	Robin Hanson	Sweden	3:54.48	
28	5	8	Miguel Durán	Spain	3:54.72	
29	5	9	Bar Soloveychik	Israel	3:55.18	
30	1	3	Ilya Borodin	Russia	3:55.46	
31	1	4	Oskar Lindholm	Denmark	3:55.89	
32	1	5	Ondřej Gemov	Czech Republic	3:56.37	
33	2	4	Arthur Ellegaard	Denmark	3:56.82	
34	3	4	Jan Micka	Czech Republic	3:57.62	
35	3	2	Efe Turan	Turkey	3:58.13	
36	2	0	Jakub Štemberk	Czech Republic	3:58.38	
37	2	2	Baturalp Ünlü	Turkey	3:58.57	
38	1	6	Jakub Poliačik	Slovakia	4:01.56	
39	2	8	Mert Kılavuz	Turkey	4:01.97	
40	2	7	Daniel Namir	Israel	4:02.39	
41	1	2	Arti Krasniqi	Kosovo	4:03.39	
42	5	0	Marin Mogić	Croatia	4:03.67	
43	1	8	Loris Bianchi	San Marino	4:03.69	
44	2	9	Pit Brandenburger	Luxembourg	4:03.71	
45	2	1	Jon Jøntvedt	Norway	4:03.92	
46	1	0	Filip Derkoski	North Macedonia	4:04.10	
47	1	7	Dylan Cachia	Malta	4:06.91	
48	1	1	Franc Aleksi	Albania	4:11.45	
49	1	9	Théo Druenne	Monaco	4:15.17	
	3	0	Franko Grgić	Croatia	Did not start	

=== Final ===
The final was held at 18:09.

Rank	Lane	Name	Nationality	Time	Notes
1st place, gold medalist(s)	7	Martin Malyutin	Russia	3:44.18	
2nd place, silver medalist(s)	6	Felix Auböck	Austria	3:44.63	
3rd place, bronze medalist(s)	1	Danas Rapšys	Lithuania	3:45.39	
4	3	Gabriele Detti	Italy	3:46.07	
5	2	Marco De Tullio	Italy	3:46.36	
6	4	Antonio Djakovic	Switzerland	3:46.54	
7	5	Henrik Christiansen	Norway	3:46.87	
8	8	Kregor Zirk	Estonia	3:48.35	NR
