= Swimming at the 2022 European Aquatics Championships – Men's 4 × 100 metre freestyle relay =

Men's 4 × 100 metre freestyle relay at the 2022 European Aquatics Championships
- Venue: Foro Italico
- Dates: 14 August
- Competitors: 74 from 17 nations
- Teams: 17
- Winning time: 3:10.50

Medalists
gold medal	Alessandro Miressi; Thomas Ceccon; Lorenzo Zazzeri; Manuel Frigo; Alessandro Bori; Filippo Megli; Leonardo Deplano	Italy
silver medal	Nándor Németh; Szebasztián Szabó; Dániel Mészáros; Kristóf Milák	Hungary
bronze medal	Jacob Whittle; Matthew Richards; Thomas Dean; Edward Mildred	Great Britain

The Men's 4 × 100 metre freestyle relay competition of the 2022 European Aquatics Championships was held on 14 August 2022.

== Records ==
Before the competition, the existing world, European and championship records were as follows.

	Team	Time	Location	Date
World record	United States	3:08.24	Beijing	11 August 2008
European record	France	3:08.32	Beijing	11 August 2008
Championship record	Russia	3:10.41	Budapest	17 May 2021

== Results ==
=== Heats ===
The heats were started at 10:02.

Rank	Heat	Lane	Nation	Swimmers	Time	Notes
1	1	3	Hungary	Nándor Németh (48.54); Szebasztián Szabó (48.54); Dániel Mészáros (48.70); Kristóf Milák (48.84)	3:14.62	Q
2	2	1	Italy	Alessandro Bori (48.69); Filippo Megli (49.09); Leonardo Deplano (48.31); Manuel Frigo (48.91)	3:15.00	Q
3	1	8	Great Britain	Edward Mildred (49.41); Jacob Whittle (48.01); Matthew Richards (49.00); Thomas Dean (48.60)	3:15.02	Q
4	2	2	Spain	Sergio de Celis (48.82) NR; Carles Coll (48.99); Mario Mollà (49.48); Luis Domínguez (47.95)	3:15.24	Q, NR
5	1	6	Netherlands	Stan Pijnenburg (48.87); Jesse Puts (48.95); Luc Kroon (48.93); Sean Niewold (48.72)	3:15.47	Q
6	1	1	France	Charles Rihoux (49.04); Guillaume Guth (48.77); Thomas Piron (49.08); Julien Berol (49.24)	3:16.13	Q
7	2	5	Poland	Karol Ostrowski (49.42); Kamil Sieradzki (48.57); Konrad Czerniak (49.08); Mateusz Chowaniec (49.37)	3:16.44	Q
8	1	2	Ukraine	Vladyslav Bukhov (49.90); Sergii Shevtsov (48.72); Illya Linnyk (48.84); Valentyn Nesterkin (49.05)	3:16.51	Q
9	1	4	Sweden	Björn Seeliger (48.46); Robin Hanson (50.02); Elias Persson (49.57); Marcus Holmquist (49.42)	3:17.47	
10	1	5	Germany	Peter Varjasi (49.05); Timo Sorgius (49.02); Sebastian Pierre-Louis (49.65); Björn Kammann (50.15)	3:17.87	
11	2	0	Romania	David Popovici (47.85); George Stoica-Constantin (49.82); Patrick Dinu (50.20); Mihai Gergely (50.07)	3:17.94	
12	2	7	Serbia	Nikola Aćin (50.20); Andrej Barna (48.01); Uroš Nikolić (49.35); Uroš Živanović (50.59)	3:18.15	
13	2	6	Israel	Denis Loktev (49.97); Ron Polonsky (49.08); Meiron Cheruti (49.22); Martin Kartavi (49.96)	3:18.23	
14	1	7	Luxembourg	Rémi Fabiani (49.74); Pit Brandenburger (49.76); Max Mannes (51.08); Julien Henx (50.34)	3:20.92	NR
15	2	4	Malta	Matthew Galea (53.50); Rudi Spiteri (52.59); Raoul Stafrace (52.76); Thomas Wareing (54.63)	3:33.48	
16	2	8	Albania	Zhulian Lavdaniti (53.25); Franc Aleksi (56.61); Even Qarri (58.83); Endi Kola (57.35)	3:46.04	
	2	3	Greece	Apostolos Christou (50.59); Kristian Gkolomeev (48.38); Stergios Bilas; Andreas Vazaios	Disqualified	

=== Final ===
The final was held at 19:15.

Rank	Lane	Nation	Swimmers	Time	Notes
1st place, gold medalist(s)	5	Italy	Alessandro Miressi (47.76); Thomas Ceccon (47.88); Lorenzo Zazzeri (47.60); Manuel Frigo (47.26)	3:10.50	
2nd place, silver medalist(s)	4	Hungary	Nándor Németh (47.86); Szebasztián Szabó (48.42); Dániel Mészáros (48.91); Kristóf Milák (47.24)	3:12.43	
3rd place, bronze medalist(s)	3	Great Britain	Jacob Whittle (48.72); Matthew Richards (47.88); Thomas Dean (47.74); Edward Mildred (48.36)	3:12.70	
4	6	Spain	Sergio de Celis (48.41) NR; Luis Domínguez (47.89); Mario Mollà (49.30); Carles Coll (48.13)	3:13.73	NR
5	2	Netherlands	Stan Pijnenburg (48.99); Jesse Puts (48.70); Luc Kroon (49.09); Sean Niewold (48.97)	3:15.75	
6	8	Ukraine	Vladyslav Bukhov (49.46); Sergii Shevtsov (48.51); Illya Linnyk (48.73); Valentyn Nesterkin (49.24)	3:15.94	NR
7	1	Poland	Ksawery Masiuk (49.41); Kamil Sieradzki (48.85); Konrad Czerniak (49.04); Karol Ostrowski (48.67)	3:15.97	
8	7	France	Maxime Grousset (47.69); Guillaume Guth; Charles Rihoux; Hadrien Salvan	Disqualified	
