= 2024 World Aquatics Swimming Championships (25 m) – Men's 200 metre freestyle =

Swimming competition

Men's 200 metre freestyle at the 2024 World Aquatics Swimming Championships (25 m)
- Venue: Duna Arena
- Location: Budapest, Hungary
- Dates: 15 December
- Competitors: 68 from 62 nations
- Winning time: 1:38.61 WR

Medalists
gold medal	Luke Hobson	United States
silver medal	Maximillian Giuliani	Australia
bronze medal	Lucas Henveaux	Belgium

The men's 200 metre freestyle event at the 2024 World Aquatics Swimming Championships (25 m) was held on 15 December 2024 at the Duna Arena in Budapest, Hungary.

== Records ==
Prior to the competition, the existing world and championship records were as follows.

World record	Paul Biedermann (GER)	1:39.37	Berlin, Germany	15 November 2009
Competition record	Hwang Sun-woo (KOR)	1:39.72	Melbourne, Australia	18 December 2022

The following records were established during this competition:

Date	Event	Name	Nationality	Time	Record
13 December	Final*	Luke Hobson	United States	1:38.91	WR
15 December	Final	Luke Hobson	United States	1:38.61	WR

* Split from the men's 4 × 200 m freestyle relay

== Background ==
The event field featured limited carryover from the 2022 Short Course World Championships. Lithuania’s Danas Rapšys, a five-time Short Course Worlds medalist, was the only swimmer from the Melbourne final entered in Budapest. Rapsys’s lifetime best stood at 1:40.85 from 2017; his season best was 1:42.00, recorded at the Incheon stop of the 2024 World Cup. Kieran Smith of the United States, who finished ninth in Melbourne, recorded a personal best of 1:41.04 while leading off the USA's 4×200 m freestyle relay and was expected to contend for a place in the final.

Olympic bronze medalist Luke Hobson also entered the event, though he had limited short-course meters experience. He was the current American record holder in the 200-yard freestyle (1:28.81). Australia’s Edward Sommerville had the fastest qualifying time with a 1:40.64 from the 2024 Australian Short Course Championships, where Max Giuliani also swam a personal best of 1:41.39. Other notable entries included Lukas Märtens, Lucas Henveaux, Tatsuya Murasa, Antonio Djakovic, and Aleksandr Shchegolev.

SwimSwam predicted Edward Sommerville would win, Luke Hobson would take second, and Max Giuliani would finish third.

== Results ==
=== Heats ===
The heats were started at 9:21.

Rank	Heat	Lane	Name	Nationality	Time	Notes
1	7	8	Luke Hobson	United States	1:41.55	Q
2	6	5	Lucas Henveaux	Belgium	1:41.58	Q, NR
3	6	9	Tomas Koski	Finland	1:41.92	Q, NR
4	7	3	Kieran Smith	United States	1:42.22	Q
5	7	5	Tatsuya Murasa	Japan	1:42.28	Q
6	7	6	Rafael Miroslaw	Germany	1:42.38	Q
7	5	4	Maximillian Giuliani	Australia	1:42.67	Q
8	6	4	Danas Rapšys	Lithuania	1:42.84	Q
9	7	4	Edward Sommerville	Australia	1:42.87	R
10	5	5	Roman Fuchs	France	1:42.93	R
11	4	4	Kamil Sieradzki	Poland	1:42.94	
12	4	8	Robin Hanson	Sweden	1:43.21	NR
13	5	2	Carlos D'Ambrosio	Italy	1:43.25	
14	5	3	Roman Akimov	Neutral Athletes B	1:43.32	
15	7	2	Aleksandr Shchegolev	Neutral Athletes B	1:43.40	
16	6	3	Kaique Alves	Brazil	1:43.48	
17	3	7	Max Litchfield	Great Britain	1:43.59	
18	6	1	Evan Bailey	Ireland	1:43.61	
19	4	5	Velimir Stjepanović	Serbia	1:43.67	
20	7	1	Dimitrios Markos	Greece	1:43.89	NR
21	7	9	Alessandro Ragaini	Italy	1:43.92	
22	3	4	Kregor Zirk	Estonia	1:43.96	
23	2	5	Nikoli Blackman	Trinidad and Tobago	1:44.05	
24	3	1	Petar Mitsin	Bulgaria	1:44.07	
25	4	2	Sašo Boškan	Slovenia	1:44.12	NR
26	7	7	Xu Yizhou	China	1:44.23	
27	5	6	Lee Ho-joon	South Korea	1:44.41	
28	6	2	Miguel Pérez-Godoy	Spain	1:44.52	
29	6	7	Richárd Márton	Hungary	1:44.61	
30	5	7	Sergio de Celis	Spain	1:44.67	
31	4	3	Konstantinos Englezakis	Greece	1:44.75	
32	7	0	Alexander Trampitsch	Austria	1:44.94	
33	6	6	Antonio Djakovic	Switzerland	1:45.03	
34	2	3	Abdalla Youssef Nasr	Egypt	1:45.04	NR
35	2	4	Jovan Lekić	Bosnia and Herzegovina	1:45.07	NR
36	5	9	Niko Janković	Croatia	1:45.31	
37	2	6	Simon Doueihy	Lebanon	1:45.32	NR
38	6	8	Markus Lie	Norway	1:45.44	
39	6	0	Jakub Poliačik	Slovakia	1:45.85	
40	5	8	Ondřej Gemov	Czech Republic	1:45.95	
41	3	5	Rafael Ponce	Peru	1:46.51	
42	4	6	Juan Morales	Colombia	1:46.61	
43	4	7	Galymzhan Balabek	Kazakhstan	1:46.76	NR
44	5	1	Kris Mihaylov	South Africa	1:47.00	
45	3	2	Ben Littlejohn	New Zealand	1:47.01	
46	5	0	Ardi Azman	Singapore	1:47.40	
47	4	1	Surasit Thongdeang	Thailand	1:47.62	
48	4	9	Terence Ng	Malaysia	1:48.12	
49	4	0	Rami Rahmouni	Tunisia	1:48.44	
50	3	8	Batbayaryn Enkhtamir	Mongolia	1:48.63	
51	3	9	He Shing Ip	Hong Kong	1:49.30	
52	2	1	Aryaan Din	Pakistan	1:49.49	NR
52	3	0	Luka Kukhalashvili	Georgia	1:49.49	
54	3	6	Caleb Romero	Puerto Rico	1:49.51	
55	2	2	Omar Abbass	Syria	1:50.05	
56	1	4	Kaeden Gleason	United States Virgin Islands	1:53.29	
57	2	9	Reidi Resuli	Albania	1:53.76	
58	1	6	Mohammed Jibali	Libya	1:54.21	
59	2	0	Stefano Mitchell	Antigua and Barbuda	1:54.49	
60	1	3	Andile Bekker	Botswana	1:55.76	
61	1	5	Rony Daher	Bolivia	1:57.06	
62	1	1	Soud Alenezi	Kuwait	1:57.09	
63	2	8	Arion Budima	Kosovo	1:57.49	
64	1	2	Baritiana Andriampenomanana	Madagascar	1:58.34	
65	1	8	Atharva Singh	Nepal	2:01.16	
66	1	7	Haziq Samil	Brunei	2:01.34	
67	1	0	Isihaka Isihaka	Rwanda	2:06.20	
68	1	9	Magnim Jordano Daou	Togo	2:35.51	
	2	7	Adrian Eichler	Philippines	Did not start	
	3	3	Alex Axon	Canada	Did not start	

=== Final ===
The final was held at 18:40.

Rank	Lane	Name	Nationality	Time	Notes
1st place, gold medalist(s)	4	Luke Hobson	United States	1:38.61	WR
2nd place, silver medalist(s)	1	Maximillian Giuliani	Australia	1:40.36	OC
3rd place, bronze medalist(s)	5	Lucas Henveaux	Belgium	1:41.13	NR
4	8	Danas Rapšys	Lithuania	1:41.24	
5	6	Kieran Smith	United States	1:41.57	
6	7	Rafael Miroslaw	Germany	1:41.71	
7	3	Tomas Koski	Finland	1:42.47	
8	2	Tatsuya Murasa	Japan	1:42.95	
