= Swimming at the 2022 European Aquatics Championships – Mixed 4 × 200 metre freestyle relay =

Mixed 4 × 200 metre freestyle relay at the 2022 European Aquatics Championships
- Venue: Foro Italico
- Dates: 16 August
- Competitors: 52 from 10 nations
- Teams: 10
- Winning time: 7:28.16

Medalists
gold medal	Thomas Dean; Matthew Richards; Freya Colbert; Freya Anderson; Kieran Bird; Jacob Whittle; Lucy Hope	Great Britain
silver medal	Hadrien Salvan; Wissam-Amazigh Yebba; Charlotte Bonnet; Lucile Tessariol; Roman Fuchs; Giulia Rossi-Bene	France
bronze medal	Stefano Di Cola; Matteo Ciampi; Alice Mizzau; Noemi Cesarano; Filippo Megli; Linda Caponi	Italy

The Mixed 4 × 200 metre freestyle relay competition of the 2022 European Aquatics Championships was held on 16 August 2022.

== Records ==
Prior to the competition, the existing world, European and championship records were as follows.

	Team	Time	Location	Date
European record	Target time	7:22.33		
Championship record	Great Britain	7:26.67	Budapest	18 May 2021

== Results ==
=== Heats ===
The heats were started at 09:58.

Rank	Heat	Lane	Nation	Swimmers	Time	Notes
1	1	2	France	Roman Fuchs (1:48.04); Wissam-Amazigh Yebba (1:46.86); Giulia Rossi-Bene (2:02.39); Lucile Tessariol (2:01.53)	7:38.82	Q
2	1	4	Great Britain	Kieran Bird (1:49.64); Jacob Whittle (1:49.54); Lucy Hope (2:00.41); Freya Colbert (2:01.25)	7:40.84	Q
3	1	5	Italy	Matteo Ciampi (1:49.55); Filippo Megli (1:49.44); Noemi Cesarano (2:01.17); Linda Caponi (2:01.06)	7:41.22	Q
4	1	6	Poland	Kamil Sieradzki (1:49.57); Mateusz Chowaniec (1:50.07); Marta Klimek (2:03.38); Aleksandra Polańska (1:58.31)	7:41.33	Q
5	1	9	Netherlands	Stan Pijnenburg (1:51.99); Luc Kroon (1:49.26); Imani de Jong (2:00.20); Silke Holkenborg (2:00.06)	7:41.51	Q
6	1	8	Hungary	Gábor Zombori (1:50.33); Dániel Mészáros (1:49.02); Katinka Hosszú (2:01.99); Zsuzsanna Jakabos (2:00.53)	7:41.87	Q
7	1	1	Israel	Denis Loktev (1:49.20); Bar Soloveychik (1:49.28); Daria Golovati (2:01.76); Lea Polonsky (2:03.82)	7:44.06	Q
8	1	0	Denmark	Andreas Hansen (1:50.02); Mikkel Gadgaard (1:51.13); Marina Heller Hansen (2:02.24); Caroline Wiuff Jensen (2:03.97)	7:47.36	Q
9	1	3	Sweden	Victor Johansson (1:49.32); Robin Hanson (1:50.14); Sofia Åstedt (2:03.53); Hanna Bergman (2:04.66)	7:47.65	
10	1	7	Slovakia	František Jablčník (1:51.58); Richard Nagy (1:55.19); Nikoleta Trniková (2:07.01); Tamara Potocká (2:07.46)	8:01.24	

=== Final ===
The final was held at 20:01.

Rank	Lane	Nation	Swimmers	Time	Notes
1st place, gold medalist(s)	5	Great Britain	Thomas Dean (1:46.15); Matthew Richards (1:46.91); Freya Colbert (1:57.29); Freya Anderson (1:57.81)	7:28.16	
2nd place, silver medalist(s)	4	France	Hadrien Salvan (1:47.63); Wissam-Amazigh Yebba (1:46.53); Charlotte Bonnet (1:56.39); Lucile Tessariol (1:58.70)	7:29.25	
3rd place, bronze medalist(s)	3	Italy	Stefano Di Cola (1:47.00); Matteo Ciampi (1:47.69); Alice Mizzau (1:58.73); Noemi Cesarano (1:58.43)	7:31.85	
4	7	Hungary	Richárd Márton (1:48.70); Dániel Mészáros (1:49.01); Nikolett Pádár (1:58.70); Lilla Minna Ábrahám (1:58.14)	7:34.55	
5	2	Netherlands	Luc Kroon (1:48.28); Stan Pijnenburg (1:48.93); Imani de Jong (1:58.93); Silke Holkenborg (1:58.54)	7:34.68	
6	1	Israel	Denis Loktev (1:47.66); Bar Soloveychik (1:48.89); Daria Golovati (2:01.40); Anastasia Gorbenko (2:00.50)	7:38.45	
7	6	Poland	Kamil Sieradzki (1:49.04); Mateusz Chowaniec (1:50.94); Aleksandra Knop (2:02.31); Aleksandra Polańska (1:59.00)	7:41.29	
8	8	Denmark	Andreas Hansen (1:50.73); Mikkel Gadgaard (1:51.17); Marina Heller Hansen (2:02.27); Caroline Wiuff Jensen (2:03.63)	7:47.80	
