= Swimming at the 2023 World Aquatics Championships – Mixed 4 × 100 metre freestyle relay =

Mixed 4 × 100 metre freestyle relay at the 2023 World Aquatics Championships
- Venue: Marine Messe Fukuoka
- Location: Fukuoka, Japan
- Dates: 29 July (heats and final)
- Competitors: 184 from 43 nations
- Teams: 43
- Winning time: 3:18.83 WR

Medalists
gold medal	Jack Cartwright; Kyle Chalmers; Shayna Jack; Mollie O'Callaghan; Flynn Southam; Madison Wilson; Meg Harris	Australia
silver medal	Jack Alexy; Matt King; Abbey Weitzeil; Kate Douglass; Chris Guiliano; Olivia Smoliga; Bella Sims	United States
bronze medal	Matt Richards; Duncan Scott; Anna Hopkin; Freya Anderson; Jacob Whittle; Tom Dean; Lucy Hope	Great Britain

The mixed 4 × 100 metre freestyle relay competition at the 2023 World Aquatics Championships was held on 29 July 2023.

== Records ==
Prior to the competition, the existing world and championship records were as follows.

World record	Australia	3:19.38	Budapest, Hungary	24 June 2022
Competition record	Australia	3:19.38	Budapest, Hungary	24 June 2022

== Results ==
=== Heats ===
The heats were started at 11:23.

Rank	Heat	Lane	Nation	Swimmers	Time	Notes
1	5	4	Australia	Flynn Southam (48.69); Jack Cartwright (47.81); Madison Wilson (52.98); Meg Harris (52.40)	3:21.88	Q
2	5	5	United States	Matt King (48.32); Chris Guiliano (48.18); Olivia Smoliga (53.30); Bella Sims (54.05)	3:23.85	Q
3	5	6	Italy	Manuel Frigo (48.54); Alessandro Miressi (47.56); Costanza Cocconcelli (54.41); Sofia Morini (53.88)	3:24.39	Q
4	4	5	Great Britain	Jacob Whittle (48.84); Tom Dean (47.93); Lucy Hope (53.87); Freya Anderson (53.77)	3:24.41	Q
5	4	4	Canada	Ruslan Gaziev (48.27); Javier Acevedo (48.07); Mary-Sophie Harvey (54.13); Taylor Ruck (54.16)	3:24.63	Q
6	4	0	Japan	Tomonobu Gomi (49.65); Katsumi Nakamura (48.59); Nagisa Ikemoto (53.79); Yume Jinno (54.44)	3:26.47	Q
7	5	2	Brazil	Guilherme Caribé Santos (48.67); Felipe Ribeiro (48.95); Ana Carolina Vieira (54.64); Stephanie Balduccini (54.22)	3:26.48	Q
8	3	4	Germany	Peter Varjasi (48.93); Rafael Miroslaw (48.40); Nele Schulze (54.58); Nina Holt (54.87)	3:26.78	Q
9	4	2	China	Yang Jintong (49.91); Ji Yicun (49.32); Yang Junxuan (54.47); Wu Qingfeng (53.38)	3:27.08	
10	5	3	France	Max Berg (49.36); Guillaume Guth (48.74); Assia Touati (55.09); Lison Nowaczyk (54.43)	3:27.62	
11	4	3	Sweden	Robin Hanson (49.46); Björn Seeliger (48.93); Louise Hansson (54.31); Sofia Åstedt (54.94)	3:27.64	
12	4	6	Netherlands	Kenzo Simons (49.67); Caspar Corbeau (49.28); Milou van Wijk (54.34); Sam van Nunen (54.54)	3:27.83	
13	5	1	South Korea	Ji Yu-chan (49.11); Yang Jae-hoon (49.17); Hur Yeon-kyung (54.43); Jeong So-eun (55.28)	3:27.99	NR
14	4	1	Israel	Denis Loktev (49.69); Meiron Cheruti (49.36); Anastasia Gorbenko (54.44); Daria Golovaty (55.29)	3:28.78	NR
15	4	8	Greece	Andreas Vazaios (49.19); Stergios Bilas (48.49); Theodora Drakou (55.05); Maria-Thaleia Drasidou (56.23)	3:28.96	NR
16	4	7	New Zealand	Cameron Gray (48.77); Carter Swift (49.06); Helena Gasson (55.79); Chelsey Edwards (55.43)	3:29.05	
17	5	7	Spain	Sergio de Celis (48.88); Carles Coll (49.27); Carmen Weiler (55.27); Ainhoa Campabadal (55.64)	3:29.06	
18	5	9	South Africa	Clayton Jimmie (50.04); Aimee Canny (54.58); Roland Schoeman (50.48); Rebecca Meder (55.06)	3:30.16	AF
19	1	6	Mexico	Jorge Iga (48.76); Andres Dupont (48.77); Athena Meneses (56.59); Tayde Revilak (56.65)	3:30.77	NR
20	5	8	Singapore	Jonathan Tan (49.24); Mikkel Lee (49.30); Quah Ting Wen (55.65); Quah Jing Wen (56.70)	3:30.89	
21	3	7	Slovakia	Matej Duša (49.89); František Jablčník (50.82); Tamara Potocká (55.04); Teresa Ivan (55.66)	3:31.41	NR
22	5	0	Hong Kong	Lau Shiu Yue (52.28); Ian Ho (49.16); Camille Cheng (55.69); Chloe Cheng (57.83)	3:34.96	NR
23	2	0	Aruba	Mikel Schreuders (49.15); Bransly Dirksz (52.97); Elisabeth Timmer (57.77); Chloe Farro (58.00)	3:37.89	NR
24	2	7	Bermuda	Benedict Parfit (52.54); Jack Harvey (51.94); Maddy Moore (57.75); Emma Harvey (56.63)	3:38.86	NR
25	3	6	Thailand	Dulyawat Kaewsriyong (50.70); Tonnam Kanteemool (51.27); Kamonchanok Kwanmuang (57.06); Jenjira Srisaard (1:00.35)	3:39.38	
26	3	3	Suspended Member Federation	Monyo Maina (53.08); Swaleh Abubakar Talib (54.34); Emily Muteti (57.78); Maria Brunlehner (57.38)	3:42.58	
27	3	2	Bahamas	Lamar Taylor (50.10); Davante Carey (51.84); Rhanishka Gibbs (1:02.16); Zaylie Thompson (59.09)	3:43.19	
28	3	5	Armenia	Artur Barseghyan (51.71); Ashot Chakhoyan (55.59); Ani Poghosyan (58.85); Varsenik Manucharyan (58.80)	3:44.95	
29	2	2	Antigua and Barbuda	Stefano Mitchell (51.74); Jadon Wuilliez (51.42); Bianca Mitchell (1:01.05); Aunjelique Liddie (1:01.17)	3:45.38	
30	3	1	Uganda	Tendo Mukalazi (52.57); Adnan Kabuye (53.71); Tara Naluwoza (1:02.05); Kirabo Namutebi (59.47)	3:47.80	NR
31	1	5	Nigeria	Clinton Opute (52.71); Colins Obi Ebingha (51.52); Dorcas Abeng (1:02.21); Adaku Nwandu (1:02.39)	3:48.83	NR
32	3	8	Samoa	Olivia Borg (58.90); Brandon Schuster (53.51); Kaiya Brown (1:01.92); Kokoro Frost (54.96)	3:49.29	NR
33	2	9	Panama	Jeancarlo Calderon Harper (53.33); Emily Santos (1:01.94); Carolina Cermelli (1:04.25); Tyler Christianson (53.67)	3:53.19	
34	3	9	Guam	James Hendrix (53.80); Mia Lee (1:01.82); Amaya Bollinger (1:04.92); Israel Poppe (54.00)	3:54.54	NR
35	2	1	Bahrain	Ali Sadeq Alawi (54.62); Abdulla Khalid Jamal (54.27); Asma Lefahler (1:01.36); Ayah Binrajab (1:04.52)	3:54.77	
36	3	0	Angola	Henrique Mascarenhas (52.76); Salvador Gordo (55.17); Maria Lopes Freitas (1:03.19); Lia Ana Lima (1:07.72)	3:58.84	
37	1	4	Papua New Guinea	Nathaniel Noka (57.02); Josh Tarere (56.89); Abigail Ai Tom (1:08.45); Georgia-Leigh Vele (1:00.78)	4:03.14	
38	1	3	Federated States of Micronesia	Taeyanna Adams (1:06.22); Tasi Limtiaco (54.87); Kyler Anthony Kihleng (58.46); Kestra Kihleng (1:04.32)	4:03.87	
39	2	4	Northern Mariana Islands	Isaiah Aleksenko (52.29); Anthony Deleon (56.51); Shoko Litulumar (1:09.97); Maria Batallones (1:06.85)	4:05.62	
40	2	6	Cape Verde	Jayla Pina (59.84); Ailton Lima (1:00.04); La Troya Pina (1:07.62); Troy Pina (59.85)	4:07.35	
41	2	8	Malawi	Filipe Gomes (53.49); Ammara Pinto (1:11.36); Tayamika Chang'Anamuno (1:06.13); Muhammad Ali Moosa (1:03.45)	4:14.43	
42	2	5	Maldives	Hamna Ahmed (1:10.02); Ali Imaan (58.07); Mohamed Rihan Shiham (1:09.78); Meral Ayn Latheef (59.87)	4:17.74	
43	2	3	Palau	Jion Hosei (58.52); Travis Dui Sakurai (57.70); Galyah Ngerchesiuch Mikel (1:11.78); Yuri Hosei (1:09.91)	4:17.91	
	4	9	Colombia		Did not start	

=== Final ===
The final was held at 21:45.

Rank	Lane	Nation	Swimmers	Time	Notes
1st place, gold medalist(s)	4	Australia	Jack Cartwright (48.14); Kyle Chalmers (47.25); Shayna Jack (51.73); Mollie O'Callaghan (51.71)	3:18.83	WR
2nd place, silver medalist(s)	5	United States	Jack Alexy (47.68); Matt King (47.78); Abbey Weitzeil (52.94); Kate Douglass (52.42)	3:20.82	
3rd place, bronze medalist(s)	6	Great Britain	Matt Richards (47.83); Duncan Scott (47.46); Anna Hopkin (53.30); Freya Anderson (53.09)	3:21.68	ER
4	2	Canada	Joshua Liendo (48.65); Ruslan Gaziev (47.58); Maggie Mac Neil (53.59); Mary-Sophie Harvey (54.00)	3:23.82	
5	3	Italy	Alessandro Miressi (47.97); Thomas Ceccon (47.93); Costanza Cocconcelli (54.84); Sofia Morini (53.79)	3:24.53	
6	1	Brazil	Guilherme Caribé Santos (48.32); Felipe Ribeiro (48.31); Ana Carolina Vieira (54.47); Stephanie Balduccini (54.11)	3:25.21	
7	7	Japan	Tomonobu Gomi (49.58); Katsumi Nakamura (48.60); Nagisa Ikemoto (53.67); Yume Jinno (55.11)	3:26.96	
8	8	Germany	Peter Varjasi (49.06); Rafael Miroslaw (48.73); Nele Schulze (54.65); Nina Holt (54.74)	3:27.18	
