= Joe Litchfield =

British swimmer (born 1998)

Personal information
- Full name: Joe Richard Litchfield
- Nationality: British
- Born: 8 July 1998 (age 28) Pontefract, West Yorkshire, England

Sport
- Sport: Swimming
- Strokes: Freestyle, medley
Medal record
Men's swimming
Representing Great Britain
World Championships (LC)
Gold medal – first place	2023 Fukuoka	4×200 m freestyle
Bronze medal – third place	2022 Budapest	4×200 m freestyle
European Championships (LC)
Gold medal – first place	2020 Budapest	4×200 m mixed freestyle
Gold medal – first place	2020 Budapest	4×100 m mixed medley
Silver medal – second place	2020 Budapest	4×100 m freestyle
Universiade
Silver medal – second place	2019 Naples	200 m medley
Bronze medal – third place	2017 Taipei	200 m medley
European Games
Silver medal – second place	2015 Baku	4×100 m medley
European Junior Championships
Gold medal – first place	2016 Hódmezővásárhely	200 m medley
Representing England
Commonwealth Games
Silver medal – second place	2022 Birmingham	4×100 m freestyle
Silver medal – second place	2022 Birmingham	4×200 m freestyle

Joe Richard Litchfield (born 8 July 1998) is a British swimmer. He has won gold medals as part of a team at the European Championship, and a team bronze at the World Championship and competed at the 2020 Summer Olympics and 2024 Summer Olympics.

== Career ==
Litchfield was born in Pontefract, West Yorkshire, the son of former professional footballer, Peter Litchfield and his older brother Max Litchfield is also a swimmer.

He competed in the men's 100 metre backstroke event at the 2020 European Aquatics Championships, in Budapest, Hungary. He won two gold medals as part of the team, swimming in the heats but not in finals, in 4 × 200 m mixed freestyle and 4 × 100 m mixed medley. He was also part of the team that won a silver in Men's 4 × 100 metre freestyle relay.

In the 2020 Summer Olympics that were held in Tokyo in 2021 due to the COVID-19 pandemic, the swimmer made his Olympic debut. Litchfield was a part of the Men's 4 × 100 m Freestyle Relay team at the 2020 Summer Olympics, narrowly missing out on a placing in the final. Individually, he also competed in the 200m Individual Medley.

At the 2022 World Aquatics Championships held in Budapest, Litchfield won a bronze as in the Men's 4 × 200 metre freestyle relay.

After winning the 100 metres butterfly at the 2024 Aquatics GB Swimming Championships, Litchfield sealed his place at the 2024 Summer Olympics for the relay event. At the 2024 Olympic Games in Paris, he participated in the men's 4 x 100 metre medley relay and mixed 4 × 100 metre medley relay.
