= Kieran Bird =

British swimmer (born 1999)

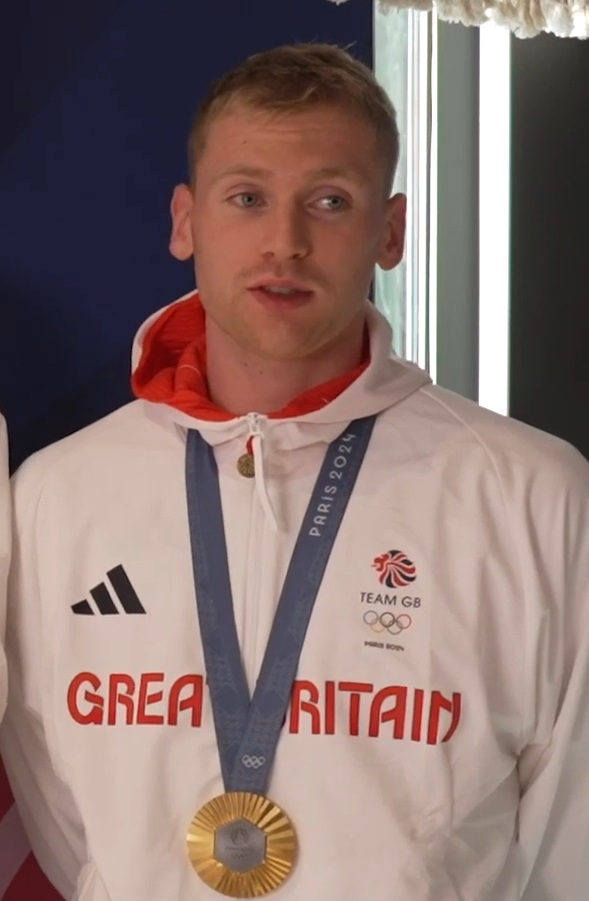
- Bird at the 2024 Summer Olympics

Personal information
- Full name: Kieran James Bird
- Nationality: British
- Born: 2 September 1999 (age 27) Bicester, Oxfordshire, England

Sport
- Sport: Swimming
- Strokes: freestyle
Medal record
Men's swimming
Representing Great Britain
Olympic Games
| Gold medal – first place | 2024 Paris | 4×200 m freestyle |
European Championships (LC)
| Gold medal – first place | 2022 Rome | 4×200 m mixed freestyle |

Kieran James Bird (born 2 September 1999) is a British swimmer who competed at the 2020 Summer Olympics and 2024 Summer Olympics.

== Biography ==
Bird attended Millfield School. he is of Welsh descent through his father.

He competed in the men's 400 metre freestyle event at the 2020 European Aquatics Championships, in Budapest, Hungary.

Bird won the 400 metres freestyle at the 2024 Aquatics GB Swimming Championships and was subsequently named in the British team for the 2024 Summer Olympics. He swam in the heats of the 4 × 200 metre freestyle relay and while he was replaced by Matt Richards for the final, as a heat swimmer he was awarded a gold medal when the British team won.
