= Martin Malyutin =

Russian swimmer

Personal information
- Full name: Martin Vladimirovich Malyutin
- Nationality: Russian
- Born: 5 July 1999 (age 26) Omsk, Russia

Sport
- Sport: Swimming
- Strokes: Freestyle
Medal record
Representing (Russia) ROC
Olympic Games
Silver medal – second place	2020 Tokyo	4×200 m freestyle
Representing Russia
World Championships (LC)
Silver medal – second place	2019 Gwangju	4×200 m freestyle
Bronze medal – third place	2019 Gwangju	200 m freestyle
World Championships (SC)
Silver medal – second place	2018 Hangzhou	4×200 m freestyle
European Championships (LC)
Gold medal – first place	2020 Budapest	200 m freestyle
Gold medal – first place	2020 Budapest	400 m freestyle
Gold medal – first place	2020 Budapest	4×200 m freestyle
Silver medal – second place	2018 Glasgow	4×200 m freestyle
Silver medal – second place	2018 Glasgow	4×200 m mixed freestyle
World Junior Championships
Bronze medal – third place	2017 Indianapolis	4×200 m freestyle

Martin Vladimirovich Malyutin (Russian: Мартин Владимирович Малютин, IPA: [ˈmartʲɪn mɐˈlʲʉtʲɪn]; born 5 July 1999) is a Russian swimmer. He has won medals at the European and World Championships.

== Career ==
He competed at the 2018 European Aquatics Championships, winning the silver medal in both 4×200 m men's freestyle relay and 4×200 m mixed freestyle relay events.

At the 2019 World Aquatics Championships held in Gwangju, South Korea, Malyutin and Duncan Scott came joint fourth in the 200 m freestyle, but the first-placed finisher Danas Rapšys was disqualified for a false start, so both Malyutin and Scott were awarded a bronze medal.
