= Dániel Mészáros =

Hungarian swimmer

Personal information
- Born: 27 September 2004 (age 21) Budapest, Hungary

Sport
- Sport: Swimming
- Strokes: Freestyle
- Club: Ferencvárosi TC
Medal record
Men's swimming
Representing Hungary
| Event | 1st | 2nd | 3rd |
|---|---|---|---|
| European Championships (LC) | 1 | 0 | 0 |
| World Junior Championships | 1 | 2 | 0 |
| European Junior Championships | 0 | 0 | 1 |
| Total | 2 | 2 | 1 |
European Championships (LC)
| Gold medal – first place | 2022 Rome | 4×200 m freestyle |
World Junior Championships
| Gold medal – first place | 2022 Lima | 4×100 m mixed freestyle |
| Silver medal – second place | 2022 Lima | 200 m freestyle |
| Silver medal – second place | 2022 Lima | 4×200 m freestyle |
European Junior Championships
| Bronze medal – third place | 2021 Rome | 4×100 m mixed freestyle |

Dániel Mészáros (born 27 September 2004) is a Hungarian competitive swimmer. He is a 2022 European Aquatics Championships gold medalist in the 4×200-metre freestyle relay. At the 2022 World Junior Championships, he won a gold medal in the 4×100-metre mixed freestyle relay and silver medals in the 200-metre freestyle and 4×200-metre freestyle relay.

== Background ==
Mészáros was born 27 September 2004 in Budapest and trains with Ferencvárosi TC swim club.

== Career ==
=== 2021–2022 ===
At the 2021 European Junior Swimming Championships, held in July in Rome, Italy, Mészáros won a bronze medal in the 4×100-metre mixed freestyle relay, swimming the lead-off leg of the relay in the final in 50.43 seconds to contribute to the final mark of 3:31.85, and placed sixth in the 4×200-metre freestyle relay, ninth in the 4×100-metre medley relay, tenth in the 4×100-metre freestyle relay, 20th in the 400-metre freestyle, and 30th in the 200-metre individual medley. The following year, at the 2022 European Junior Swimming Championships held in July in Otopeni, Romania, he placed fourth in the 200-metre freestyle, with a time of 1:48.89 that equalled his personal best time in the event, placed sixth in the 4×200-metre freestyle relay, contributing to the final time of 7:24.64 with a lead-off time of 1:49.98, and placed seventh in the 400-metre freestyle with a time of 3:53.54.

==== 2022 European Aquatics Championships ====
2022 European Championships (LC)
| Gold medal – first place | 4×200 m freestyle | 7:05.38 (h) |

On the first day of swimming competition at the 2022 European Aquatics Championships, held in August at Foro Italico in Rome, Italy, Mészáros won a gold medal as part of the 4×200-metre freestyle relay, splitting a 1:49.48 for the seconds leg of the relay in the preliminary heats to help qualify the relay to the final ranking sixth, where the finals relay finished first in a time of 7:05.38. Three days later, on 14 August, he placed 28th in the 200-metre freestyle with a time of 1:50.60. For his final two events, he placed fourth in the 4×200-metre mixed freestyle relay with a final mark of 7:34.55, swimming on both the prelims relay and the finals relay on 16 August, and 26th in the 400-metre freestyle on 17 August with a time of 3:54.70.

==== 2022 World Junior Championships ====
2022 World Junior Championships
| Gold medal – first place | 4×100 m mixed freestyle | 3:30.03 |
| Silver medal – second place | 200 m freestyle | 1:48.98 |
| Silver medal – second place | 4×200 m freestyle | 7:17.55 |

Starting his competition on day one of the 2022 FINA World Junior Swimming Championships, held starting 30 August in Lima, Peru, Mészáros swam on both the prelims and finals relays in the 4×100-metre freestyle relay, helping place fifth in the final in 3:20.59 by splitting a 49.55 for the anchor leg of the relay. The following day, he won the silver medal in the 200-metre freestyle with a time of 1:48.98, which was 2.80 seconds behind gold medalist David Popovici of Romania and 0.07 seconds ahead of bronze medalist Filippo Bertoni of Italy. The third day, he won a gold medal in the 4×100-metre mixed freestyle relay, contributing a lead-off time of 50.79 seconds to the final mark of 3:30.03 achieved by him and his finals relay teammates Benedek Bóna, Nikolett Pádár, and Dóra Molnár. On 2 September, he split a 1:48.01 for the fourth leg of the 4×200-metre freestyle relay in the final to help win the silver medal with a time of 7:17.55, which was less than half a second behind the gold medal-winning team from Italy. Day six of six, 4 September, he contributed a time of 51.10 seconds for the freestyle leg of the 4×100-metre medley relay in the preliminaries to help qualify the relay to the final ranking fifth before Benedek Bóna substituted in for him on the finals relay and the finals relay was disqualified for an early start by the second leg swimmer.

==== 2022 Hungarian Short Course Championships ====
In November, at the 2022 Hungarian National Short Course Championships in Kaposvár, Mészáros placed sixth in the final of the 400-metre freestyle on the first day of competition with a time of 3:47.99. The second day of competition, he followed up with a personal best time of 23.00 seconds in the 50-metre freestyle to place sixth in the b-final. In his final event, the 200-metre freestyle on day three, he achieved a personal best time of 1:45.40 in the final to place fifth, finishing 1.86 seconds behind gold medalist Kristóf Milák. The following month, he won the bronze medal in the 100-metre freestyle on day one of the 2023 Hungarian Junior National Short Course Championships with a personal best time of 49.07 seconds. On the second day, he won the gold medal in the 400-metre freestyle with a personal best time of 3:44.36, which was 1.14 seconds faster than the silver medalist. In the 200-metre freestyle on the third day, he lowered his personal best time to a 1:44.92 and won the gold medal, finishing 1.61 seconds ahead of silver medalist Benedek Bóna. He placed fourth in the 800-metre freestyle on the final day with a personal best time of 8:01.14.

== International championships (50 m) ==
| Meet | 200 free | 400 free | 200 medley | 4×100 free | 4×200 free | 4×100 medley | 4×100 mixed free | 4×200 mixed free |
|---|---|---|---|---|---|---|---|---|
Junior level
| EJC 2021 | | 20th | 30th | 10th | 6th | 9th | 3rd place, bronze medalist(s) | —N/a |
| EJC 2022 | 4th | 7th | | | 6th | | | —N/a |
| WJC 2022 | 2nd place, silver medalist(s) | | | 5th | 2nd place, silver medalist(s) | DSQ^{[a]}^{[b]} | 1st place, gold medalist(s) | —N/a |
Senior level
| EC 2022 | 28th | 26th | | | (gold) ^{[a]} | | | 4th |

^{a} Mészáros swam only in the preliminary heats.
^{b} Mészáros was not a member of the finals relay that was disqualified.

== Personal best times ==
=== Long course metres (50 m pool) ===
| Event | Time | Meet | Location | Date | Age | Ref |
|---|---|---|---|---|---|---|
| 50 m freestyle | 23.68 | 2022 Hungarian Youth Championships | Kaposvár | 2 June 2022 | 17 | |
| 100 m freestyle | 50.71 | 2022 Hungarian Youth Championships | Kaposvár | 3 June 2022 | 17 | |
| 200 m freestyle | 1:48.89 | 2022 European Junior Championships | Otopeni, Romania | 6 July 2022 | 17 | |
| 400 m freestyle | 3:52.57 | 15th Gyor Open | Győr | 17 December 2021 | 17 | |

=== Short course metres (25 m pool) ===
| Event | Time | | Meet | Location | Date | Age | Ref |
|---|---|---|---|---|---|---|---|
| 50 m freestyle | 23.00 | b | 2022 Hungarian National Short Course Championships | Kaposvár | 17 November 2022 | 18 | |
| 100 m freestyle | 49.07 | | 2022 Hungarian Junior National Short Course Championships | Szeged | 7 December 2022 | 18 | |
| 200 m freestyle | 1:44.92 | | 2022 Hungarian Junior National Short Course Championships | Szeged | 9 December 2022 | 18 | |
| 400 m freestyle | 3:44.36 | | 2022 Hungarian Junior National Short Course Championships | Szeged | 8 December 2022 | 18 | |
| 800 m freestyle | 8:01.14 | | 2022 Hungarian Junior National Short Course Championships | Szeged | 10 December 2022 | 18 | |

Legend: b – b-final

== Awards and honours ==
- M4 Sport, Hungarian Youth Athletes Performance of the Year (individual sports, mixed team): 2022 (4×100-metre mixed freestyle relay at the 2022 World Junior Championships)
