= Kai Taylor =

Australian swimmer (born 2003)

Personal information
- Nationality: Australian
- Born: 18 August 2003 (age 23) South Brisbane, Australia

Sport
- Sport: Swimming
- Strokes: Freestyle
- Coach: Dean Boxall
Medal record
Men's swimming
Representing Australia
Olympic Games
Silver medal – second place	2024 Paris	4×100 m freestyle
Bronze medal – third place	2024 Paris	4×200 m freestyle
Commonwealth Games
Gold medal – first place	2026 Glasgow	200 m freestyle
Gold medal – first place	2026 Glasgow	4×100 m freestyle
Gold medal – first place	2026 Glasgow	4×200 m freestyle
Gold medal – first place	2026 Glasgow	4×100 m mixed freestyle
World Championships (LC)
Gold medal – first place	2023 Fukuoka	4×100 m freestyle
Gold medal – first place	2025 Singapore	4×100 m freestyle
Silver medal – second place	2024 Doha	4×100 m mixed freestyle
Bronze medal – third place	2023 Fukuoka	4×200 m freestyle
Bronze medal – third place	2023 Fukuoka	4×100 m medley
Bronze medal – third place	2025 Singapore	4×200 m freestyle
Pan Pacific Championships
Silver medal – second place	2026 Irvine	4×100 m freestyle
Silver medal – second place	2026 Irvine	4×200 m freestyle

Kai Taylor (born 18 August 2003) is an Australian swimmer. He won two medals the 2024 Summer Olympics, and a gold medal in the 200m Freestyle at the 2026 Commonwealth Games.

== Early life ==
Taylor is the son of Australian swimming Olympic medallist Hayley Lewis.

== Swimming career ==
Taylor competed at the 2023 Australian Trials in Melbourne. He finished ninth in the 200 m freestyle heats, initially missing the A final. However, he was promoted to the A final after Kyle Chalmers, the fastest qualifier, withdrew. Taylor finished first from lane 8, recording a time of 1:46.25. He later came fourth in the 100 m freestyle with a time of 48.60. These performances qualified him for the 2023 World Championships in Fukuoka.

In Fukuoka, Taylor's first event was the 4 × 100 m freestyle relay. He swam the third leg and split 47.91. Australia won the gold medal in a final time of 3:10.16. His next event was the 200 m freestyle, where he recorded a time of 1:46.94 to finish twentieth in the heats. In the 4 × 200 m freestyle relay, Taylor swam the third leg in the heats, splitting 1:44.56. He swam the first leg in the final with a split of 1:45.79. Australia won the bronze medal with an overall time of 7:02.13. Taylor's final event was the 4 × 100 m medley relay, where he swam the freestyle leg in the heats. He was replaced by Chalmers in the final and Australia ultimately won the bronze medal.

Taylor competed at the 2024 World Championships in Doha. He went 1:46.37 in the 200 m freestyle to finish ninth. He then competed in the 100 m freestyle, finishing thirteenth in a time of 48.50. His final event was the mixed 4 × 100 m freestyle relay, where he split 48.01 on the first leg, winning the silver medal in a time of 3:21.78.

Taylor qualified for the 2024 Olympics in Paris. He swam in the 4 × 100 m freestyle relay, splitting 47.72 on the third leg to move Australia into fourth place at the 300 m mark. Australia eventually won the silver medal in a time of 3:10.35. Taylor later competed in the heats of the 4 × 200 m freestyle relay and split 1:47.60 on the first leg. He was replaced in the final, and Australia eventually won the bronze medal.

At the 2025 World Championships in Singapore, Taylor competed in the 4 × 100 m freestyle relay. He swam the second leg and split 47.04 to keep Australia in second place at the 200 m mark. Australia won the gold medal in a championship and Australian record time of 3:08.97. Taylor then swam the third leg of the 4 × 200 m freestyle relay. Australia was in fourth place at the 400 m mark, but a 1:44.64 split from Taylor moved the team to third place upon the completion of his leg. Australia won bronze in a time of 7:00.98.

At the 2026 Commonwealth Games, Taylor competed in the 200m Freestyle. He qualified for the final in 7th place, with a time of 1:47.23, meaning he would race the final in lane 1. In the final, Taylor set out at a blistering pace, turning at the 100m mark 0.1 seconds under the World Record time. He was able to hold his lead over the field for the duration of the race, winning his first Commonwealth Games gold medal in a time of 1:45.22.
