= Maximillian Giuliani =

Australian swimmer (born 2003)

Personal information
- Nationality: Australian
- Born: 3 July 2003 (age 23)
- Height: 1.92 m (6 ft 4 in)

Sport
- Sport: Swimming
- Strokes: Freestyle
Medal record
Men's swimming
Representing Australia
Olympic Games
Bronze medal – third place	2024 Paris	4×200 m freestyle
World Championships (LC)
Gold medal – first place	2025 Singapore	4×100 m freestyle
Bronze medal – third place	2025 Singapore	4×200 m freestyle
World Championships (SC)
Silver medal – second place	2024 Budapest	200 m freestyle
Silver medal – second place	2024 Budapest	4×200 m freestyle
Pan Pacific Championships
Silver medal – second place	2026 Irvine	4×200 m freestyle

Maximillian Giuliani (born 3 July 2003) is an Australian swimmer. He competed at the Olympics, where he won the bronze medal in the 4 × 200 m freestyle relay. He is the reigning world champion in the 4 × 100 m freestyle relay, and holds the World Championship and Australian records in event.

== Early life ==
Giuliani grew up in Carlton, Tasmania, swimming for Hobart Aquatic Club. In 2022, he relocated to Queensland to join Richard Scarce's program at Miami.

== Career ==
At the 2023 Queensland Championships, Giuliani went 1:44.79 in the 200 m freestyle. This made him the second-fastest Australian in the history of the event.

Giuliani made his Olympic debut in 2024. Competing in the 200 m freestyle, he finished 7th in a time of 1:45.57. He swam in the 4 × 200 m freestyle relay, where Australia won the bronze medal in a time of 7:01.98.

Giuliani later competed at the 2024 Short Course World Championships in Budapest. In the 4 × 200 m freestyle relay, he led off in a time of 1:40.73. The team set an Oceanian record time of 6:45.54 to win the silver medal. In the 200 m freestyle, Giuliani recorded 1:40.36 to win another silver medal. This was a new Australian record, surpassing Edward Sommerville's mark of 1:40.64 from September 2024.

At the 2025 World Championships in Singapore, Giuliani competed in the 4 × 100 m freestyle relay. He swam the third leg, splitting 47.63. Australia won the gold medal in a time of 3:08.97, breaking the championship and Australian records in the process. Giuliani later swam the anchor leg of the 4 × 200 m freestyle relay, splitting 1:44.92. Australia won bronze in a time of 7:00.98.
