= Balázs Holló =

Hungarian swimmer (born 1999)

Personal information
- Nationality: Hungarian
- Born: 10 February 1999 (age 27) Eger, Hungary

Sport
- Sport: Swimming
Medal record
Men's swimming
Representing Hungary
European Championships (LC)
Gold medal – first place	2022 Rome	4×200 m freestyle
Gold medal – first place	2024 Belgrade	4×200 m mixed freestyle
Silver medal – second place	2024 Belgrade	400 m medley
Silver medal – second place	2024 Belgrade	4×200 m freestyle

Balázs Holló (born 10 February 1999) is a Hungarian swimmer. He competed in the men's 4 × 200 metre freestyle relay at the 2020 Summer Olympics.
