= Nándor Németh =

Hungarian swimmer

Personal information
- Nationality: Hungarian
- Born: 19 November 1999 (age 26) Siófok, Hungary
- Height: 1.91 m (6 ft 3 in)
- Weight: 80 kg (176 lb)

Sport
- Sport: Swimming
- Strokes: Freestyle
- Club: Ezüstpart SE (–2013); Érdi Úszó Sport Kft. Egri ÚK (2014–2018); BVSC-Zugló (2019–present)
- Coach: Zsolt Plagányi, Ottó Kovács
Medal record
Men's swimming
Representing Hungary
World Championships (LC)
Bronze medal – third place	2017 Budapest	4×100 m freestyle
Bronze medal – third place	2024 Doha	100 m freestyle
European Championships (LC)
Gold medal – first place	2022 Rome	4×200 m freestyle
Gold medal – first place	2026 Paris	4×100 m freestyle
Silver medal – second place	2022 Rome	4×100 m freestyle
Silver medal – second place	2024 Belgrade	4×200 m freestyle
Silver medal – second place	2024 Belgrade	100 m freestyle
European Championships (SC)
Silver medal – second place	2025 Lublin	4×50 m mixed freestyle
World Junior Championships
Gold medal – first place	2017 Indianapolis	4×100 m freestyle
Gold medal – first place	2017 Indianapolis	4×200 m freestyle
Silver medal – second place	2017 Indianapolis	100 m freestyle
Silver medal – second place	2017 Indianapolis	200 m freestyle

Nándor Németh (born 19 November 1999) is a Hungarian swimmer. He competed in the men's 4 × 100 metre freestyle relay event at the 2017 World Aquatics Championships.

== Major results ==
=== Individual ===
Year	Competition	Venue	Position	Event	Notes
Representing Hungary
2018	European Championships	Glasgow, United Kingdom	26th (h)	50 m freestyle	22.77
2018	European Championships	Glasgow, United Kingdom	6th	100 m freestyle	48.55
2018	European Championships	Glasgow, United Kingdom	19th (h)	200 m freestyle	1:49.41
2019	World Championships	Gwangju, South Korea	30th (h)	50 m freestyle	22.51
2019	World Championships	Gwangju, South Korea	6th	100 m freestyle	48.10
2020	European Championships	Budapest, Hungary	25th (h)	50 m freestyle	22.44
2020	European Championships	Budapest, Hungary	4th	100 m freestyle	47.84 NR
2020	Olympic Games	Tokyo, Japan	8th	100 m freestyle	48.10
2020	Olympic Games	Tokyo, Japan	15th (sf)	200 m freestyle	1:47.20
2022	World Championships	Budapest, Hungary	6th	100 m freestyle	48.13
2022	World Championships	Budapest, Hungary	19th (h)	200 m freestyle	1:47.71
2022	European Championships	Rome, Italy	25th (h)	50 m freestyle	22.44
2022	European Championships	Rome, Italy	9th	200 m freestyle	1:47.15
2023	World Championships	Fukuoka, Japan	8th	100 m freestyle	48.17
2023	World Championships	Fukuoka, Japan	23rd (h)	200 m freestyle	1:47.11
2024	World Championships	Doha, Qatar	3rd	100 m freestyle	47.78
2024	World Championships	Doha, Qatar	19th (h)	200 m freestyle	1:47.52
2024	Olympic Games	Paris, France	4th	100 m freestyle	47.50
2025	World Championships	Singapore		100 m freestyle	.

=== Relay ===
Year	Competition	Venue	Position	Event	Notes
Representing Hungary
2017	World Championships	Budapest, Hungary	3rd	4 × 100 m freestyle	3:11.99
2017	World Championships	Budapest, Hungary	10th (h)	4 × 200 m freestyle	7:11.10
2018	European Championships	Glasgow, United Kingdom	4th	4 × 100 m freestyle	3:14.51
2018	European Championships	Glasgow, United Kingdom	4th	4 × 200 m mixed freestyle	7:31.19
2018	European Championships	Glasgow, United Kingdom	5th	4 × 100 m medley	3:34.24
2019	World Championships	Gwangju, South Korea	7th	4 × 100 m freestyle	3:12.85
2019	World Championships	Gwangju, South Korea	15th (h)	4 × 200 m freestyle	7:13.64
2020	European Championships	Budapest, Hungary	4th	4 × 100 m freestyle	3:12.50
2020	European Championships	Budapest, Hungary	10th (h)	4 × 200 m freestyle	7:16.05
2020	European Championships	Budapest, Hungary	10th (h)	4 × 100 m medley	3:36.05
2020	European Championships	Budapest, Hungary	5th	4 × 100 m mixed freestyle	3:26.27
2020	Olympic Games	Tokyo, Japan	5th	4 × 100 m freestyle	3:11.06 NR
2022	World Championships	Budapest, Hungary	5th	4 × 100 m freestyle	3:11.24
2022	World Championships	Budapest, Hungary	5th	4 × 200 m freestyle	7:06.27
2022	European Championships	Rome, Italy	2nd	4 × 100 m freestyle	3:12.43
2022	European Championships	Rome, Italy	1st	4 × 200 m freestyle	7:05.38 NR
2022	European Championships	Rome, Italy	7th	4 × 100 m mixed freestyle	3:26.54
2023	World Championships	Fukuoka, Japan	11th (h)	4 × 100 m freestyle	3:14.42
2024	World Championships	Doha, Qatar	5th	4 × 100 m freestyle	3:13.66
