= Jacob Whittle =

British competitive swimmer (born 2004)

Personal information
- Full name: Jacob Henry Whittle
- Nationality: British (English)
- Born: 25 September 2004 (age 21) Alfreton, England
- Height: 1.94 m (6 ft 4 in)

Sport
- Sport: Swimming
- Strokes: Freestyle
- Club: Loughborough University; Derby Excel SC
Medal record
Men's swimming
Representing Great Britain
World Championships (LC)
Bronze medal – third place	2022 Budapest	4×200 m freestyle
Bronze medal – third place	2023 Fukuoka	4×100 m mixed freestyle
European Championships (LC)
Gold medal – first place	2020 Budapest	4×100 m mixed freestyle
Gold medal – first place	2022 Rome	4×200 m mixed freestyle
Silver medal – second place	2020 Budapest	4×100 m freestyle
Silver medal – second place	2022 Rome	4×100 m mixed freestyle
Bronze medal – third place	2022 Rome	4×100 m freestyle
European Youth Olympic Festival
Gold medal – first place	2019 Baku	4×100 m freestyle
Gold medal – first place	2019 Baku	4×100 m mixed freestyle
Silver medal – second place	2019 Baku	100 m freestyle
Silver medal – second place	2019 Baku	4×100 m medley
Silver medal – second place	2019 Baku	4×100 m mixed medley
European Junior Championships
Gold medal – first place	2022 Otopeni	4x100 m medley
Silver medal – second place	2022 Otopeni	100 m freestyle
Silver medal – second place	2022 Otopeni	4x100 m freestyle
Bronze medal – third place	2019 Kazan	4x100 m freestyle
Bronze medal – third place	2022 Otopeni	200 m freestyle
Representing England
Commonwealth Games
Gold medal – first place	2022 Birmingham	4×100 m medley
Silver medal – second place	2022 Birmingham	4×100 m freestyle
Silver medal – second place	2022 Birmingham	4×200 m freestyle
Silver medal – second place	2022 Birmingham	4×100 m mixed freestyle
Silver medal – second place	2026 Glasgow	4×100 m freestyle

Jacob Henry Whittle (born 25 September 2004) is a British competitive swimmer from Alfreton who specializes in freestyle swimming and competed at the 2020 Summer Olympics and the 2024 Summer Olympics.

== Biography ==
In 2020 he joined as the youngest member of the New York Breakers in the International Swimming League as a professional athlete. Whittle was included in April 2021 as a member of the British team to go to the postponed 2020 Olympics in Tokyo. He joined an "exceptionally high quality" swimming team which included Sarah Vasey, Abbie Wood and Molly Renshaw who are all from Derbyshire and also at their first Olympics.

In 2024, he was named in the British team for the 2024 Summer Olympics. At the 2024 Olympic Games in Paris, he participated in the men's 100 metre freestyle competition, where he was eliminated in the heats.

In 2025, Whittle swan 48.45 at the 2025 Aquatics GB Swimming Championships earning selection for the 2025 World Aquatics Championships in Singapore. Subsequently at the World Championships, he reached placed fourth in the final of the 4x100 freestyle relay.
