= Luc Kroon =

Dutch swimmer (born 2001)

Personal information
- Nationality: Dutch
- Born: 30 August 2001 (age 24)
- Height: 6’7
- Weight: 92 kg (203 lb)

Sport
- Sport: Swimming
- Coached by: Mark Faber
Medal record
Men's swimming
Representing Netherlands
European Championships (LC)
Silver medal – second place	2020 Budapest	4×100 m mixed freestyle
European Championships (SC)
Gold medal – first place	2021 Kazan	400 metre freestyle
Silver medal – second place	2021 Kazan	200 metre freestyle

Luc Kroon (born 30 August 2001) is a Dutch former swimmer from Volendam. He is the current holder of the Dutch records in swimming in the 400m freestyle and 800m freestyle short-course. He competed at the 2020 European Aquatics Championships in the 400 metre freestyle event. He won with the team the silver medal in the mixed 4 × 100 metre freestyle relay event.

== Personal bests ==
Short course
Event	Time	Date	Location
200 m freestyle	1:42.20	2021-11-06	Kazan, Russia
400 m freestyle	3:38.33NR	2021-11-02	Kazan, Russia
800 m freestyle	7:44.18NR	2019-12-21	Tilburg, Netherlands

Long course
Event	Time	Date	Location
200 m freestyle	1:47.85	2020-12-04	Amsterdam, Netherlands
400 m freestyle	3:50.91	2019-07-03	Kazan, Russia
