= Nils Liess =

Swiss swimmer (born 1996)

Personal information
- Nationality: Swiss
- Born: 24 August 1996 (age 29) Geneva, Switzerland

Sport
- Sport: Swimming
- Club: Genève Natation 1885

Nils Liess (born 24 August 1996) is a Swiss swimmer. He competed in the men's 200 metre freestyle event at the 2017 World Aquatics Championships. In 2014, he represented Switzerland at the 2014 Summer Youth Olympics held in Nanjing, China.
