= Hadrien Salvan =

French swimmer (born 1997)

Personal information
- Nationality: French
- Born: 10 July 1997 (age 29) Paris, France
- Height: 1.94 m (6 ft 4 in)
- Weight: 74 kg (163 lb)

Sport
- Sport: Swimming
Medal record
Men's swimming
Representing France
European Championships (LC)
Gold medal – first place	2022 Rome	4×100 m mixed freestyle
Silver medal – second place	2022 Rome	4×200 m mixed freestyle
Bronze medal – third place	2022 Rome	4×200 m freestyle

Hadrien Salvan (born 10 July 1997) is a French swimmer. He competed in the men's 4 × 200 metre freestyle relay at the 2020 Summer Olympics.
