= Rafael Miroslaw =

German swimmer

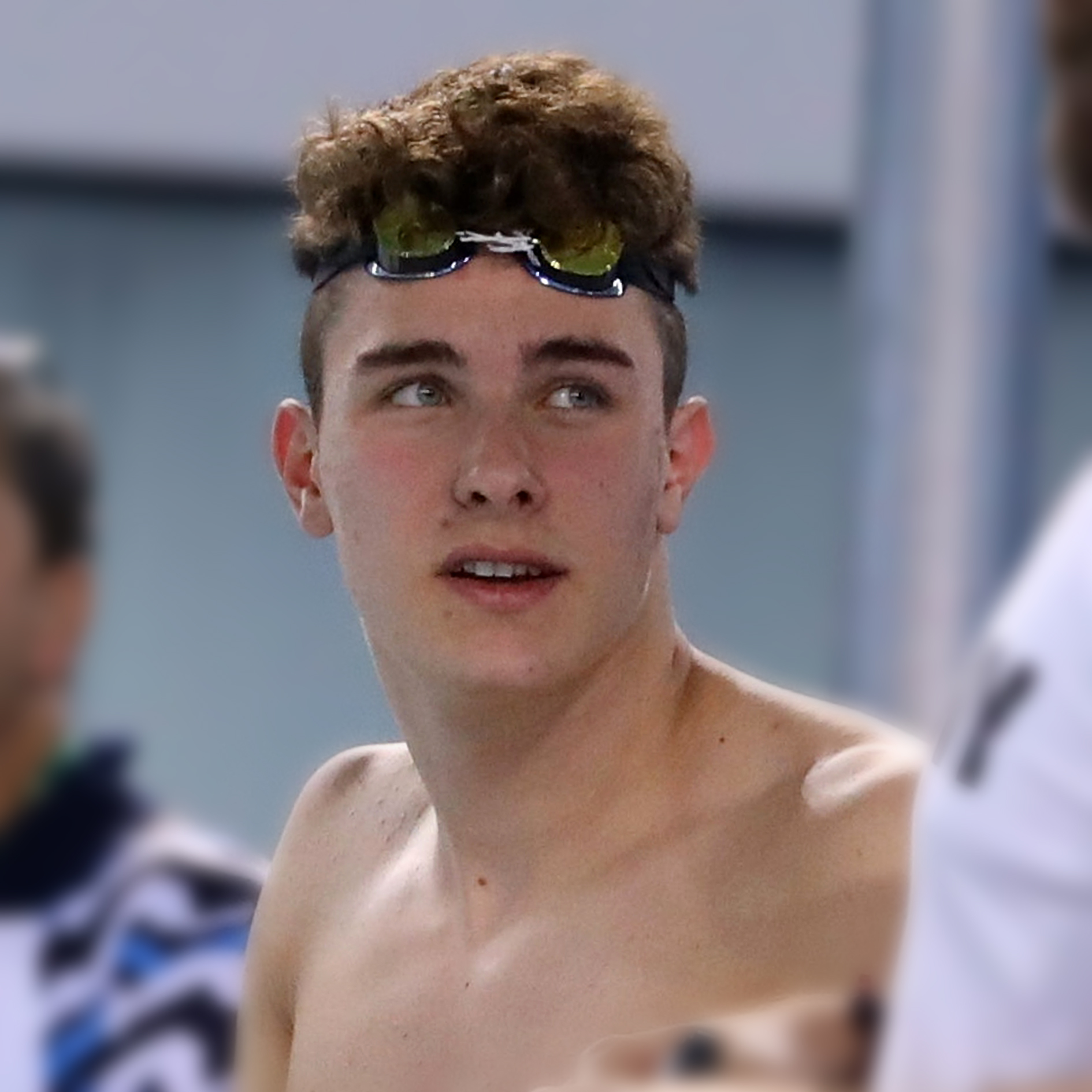
- Rafael Miroslaw (2018)

Personal information
- Nationality: German
- Born: 25 March 2001 (age 24); Hamburg

Sport
- Sport: Swimming

Rafael Miroslaw (born 25 March 2001) is a German competitive swimmer. He represented Germany at the 2024 Summer Olympics.
