= Enzo Tesic =

French swimmer

Personal information
- Nationality: French
- Born: 7 January 2000 (age 26)

Sport
- Sport: Swimming
Medal record
Men's swimming
Representing France
European Championships (LC)
Bronze medal – third place	2022 Rome	4×200 m freestyle

Enzo Tesic (born 7 January 2000) is a French swimmer. He competed in the men's 4 × 200 metre freestyle relay at the 2020 Summer Olympics.
