= Antonio Djakovic =

Swiss swimmer (born 2002)

Personal information
- Nationality: Swiss
- Born: 8 October 2002 (age 23) Frauenfeld, Switzerland

Sport
- Sport: Swimming
Medal record
Men's swimming
Representing Switzerland
World Championships (SC)
Bronze medal – third place	2021 Abu Dhabi	400 m freestyle
European Championships (LC)
Silver medal – second place	2022 Rome	200 m freestyle
Silver medal – second place	2022 Rome	400 m freestyle
Bronze medal – third place	2024 Belgrade	200 m freestyle
Bronze medal – third place	2024 Belgrade	400 m freestyle
European Youth Olympic Festival
Bronze medal – third place	2017 Győr	200 m freestyle
Bronze medal – third place	2017 Győr	400 m freestyle

Antonio Djakovic (born 8 October 2002) is a Swiss freestyle swimmer. He competed at the 2020 Summer Olympic Games in Tokyo and the 2024 Summer Olympic Games in Paris.

He competed at the 2019 World Aquatics Championships. He made the final of the men's 400 m freestyle at the 2023 World Aquatics Championships in Fukuoka, Japan.

At the 2021 FINA World Swimming Championships (25 m) he won bronze in the 400 metres freestyle.

He has won four medals at the European Championships. He won silver in the 200 metres freestyle and the 400 metres freestyle at the 2022 European Championships and bronze in the same events at the 2024 edition.

His parents, Goran and Kata are of Croatian origin. His sister, Vanna is also a swimmer.
