= Bar Soloveychik =

Israeli swimmer (born 2000)

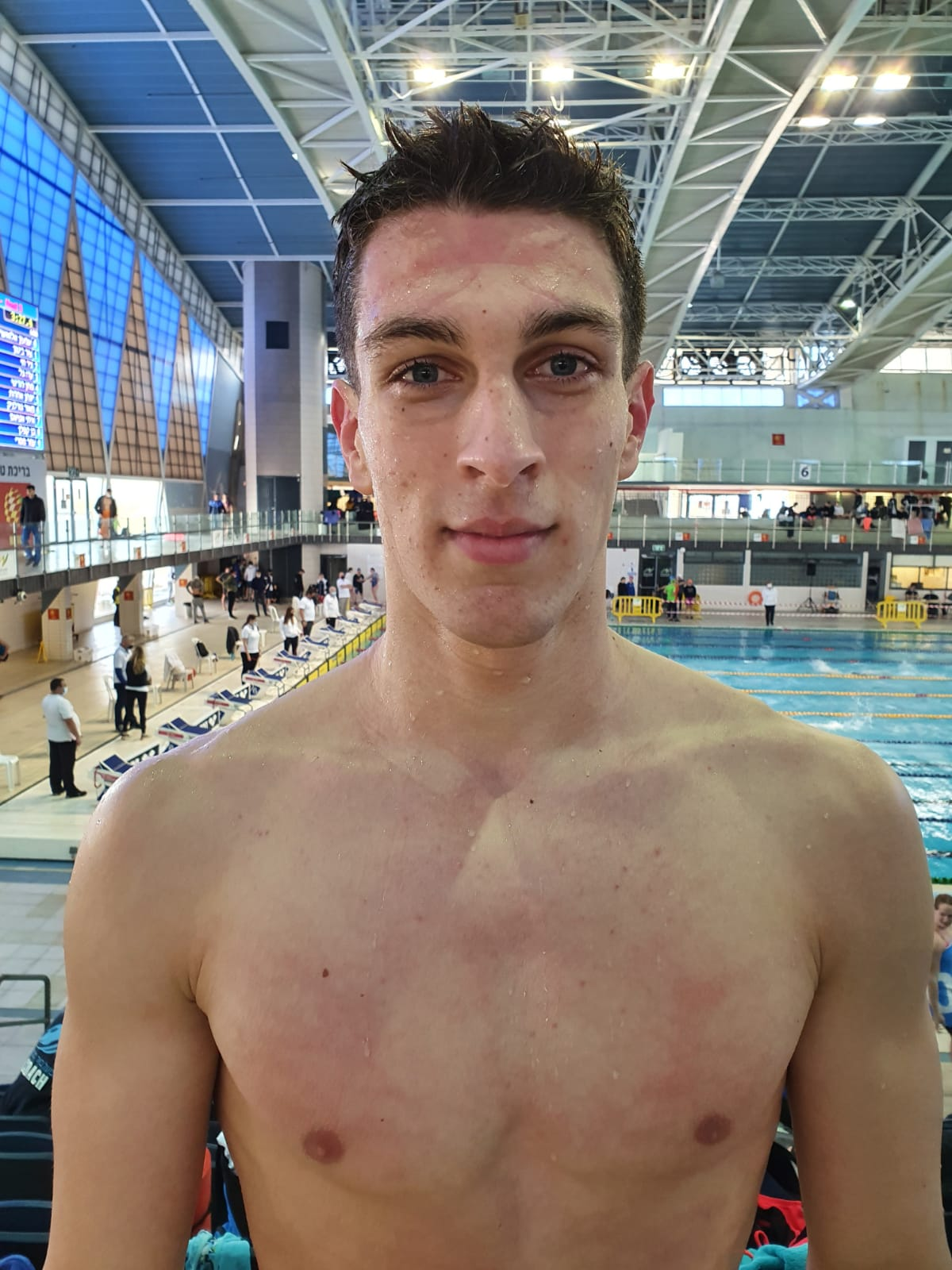

Personal information
- Native name: בר סולובייצ'יק
- National team: Israel
- Born: August 15, 2000 (age 26) Kiryat Motzkin, Israel

Sport
- Sport: Swimming
- Strokes: Freestyle
- Club: Maccabi Kiryat Bialik swim club
- College team: University of Minnesota
Medal record
European Junior Swimming Championships
Gold medal – first place	2018 Helsinki	4x200m freestyle

Bar Soloveychik (Hebrew: בר סולובייצ'יק; born August 15, 2000) is an Israeli swimmer. He holds the Israeli national records in both the 400m freestyle, and the 800m free. At the 2018 European Junior Swimming Championships, he won a gold medal as part of Israel's 4 × 200 m freestyle relay. He attends the University of Minnesota, where he has swum sprint, mid-distance, and distance events, and holds school records in the 200 free and 500 free. He won a gold medal at the 2022 Maccabiah Games in the 400 m freestyle. He competes in freestyle and open water. Soloveychik represented Israel at the 2024 Paris Olympics in the Men's 4×200 metre freestyle relay.

== Early life ==
His parents are Anatoly and Marina Soloveychik, and he is a native of Kiryat Motzkin, Israel, outside of Haifa. His parents emigrated from the Donbas region of Ukraine to Israel in 1999, and he was born in Israel two years later. He has two siblings, Itay and Aviel. He graduated in 2021 from Makif Hof HaSharon.

== Swimming career ==
Soloveychik is a member of Maccabi Kiryat Bialik swim club. He trained at the Wingate Institute. He competes in 1500 m freestyle, 200 m freestyle, 400 m freestyle, 7.5 km open water, 800 m freestyle, 4 × 200 m freestyle, and 4 × 200 m freestyle mixed.

He holds the Israeli national records in both the 400m freestyle (3:49.77 in March 2021 at the 2021 Union Cup in Israel, when he was 20 years old), and the 800m free (7:55.48 in June 2021, beating his own record by four seconds).

=== 2017–20 ===
He competed at the 2017 European Junior Swimming Championships. He competed at the 2017 Maccabiah Games.

At the 2018 European Junior Swimming Championships, in Helsinki, Finland, Soloveychik won a gold medal as part of Israel's 4 × 200 m freestyle relay at 17 years of age.

At the 2019 Israeli Short Course Championships, Soloveychik won a bronze medal in the 400 freestyle (3:47.82), and a silver medal in the 1,500 freestyle (15:14.13). At the Swim Cup Amsterdam meet, he took 4th place in the 400 and 1,500 freestyles (3:53.94 and 15:34.87 respectively), and 5th place in the 800 LCM freestyle (8:08.00).

In December 2020, he won the Israel Winter Olympic Trials title in the 800, with a 8:01.83, and the 1500 free.

=== 2021–22 ===
Soloveychik placed first in the 800m free (7:55.48), and third in the 200m free (1:48.63), at the 2021 Israeli National Summer Championships in June. He took first in both the 400m and 800m freestyles at the 2021 Israeli Union Cup. He competed at the 2019 World University Games, in Naples, Italy.

At the 2022 Maccabiah Games, Soloveychik broke the record that had stood for 33 years in the 400 m freestyle, winning in a record time of 3:54.75. After the race, he said: “I feel very proud to compete in the Maccabiah and break the Maccabiah record, especially since it is a very special record that has stood for decades."

Soloveychik attends the University of Minnesota where he is studying computer science, and competing for the Minnesota Golden Gophers he has swum sprint, mid-distance, and distance events. He is coached most closely at the school by Jeff Kostoff and Maddy Olson. He holds school record in 200 free (1:33.56) and 500 free (4:12.76) At his NCAA Championships debut at the 2022 NCAA Division I Men's Swimming and Diving Championships in Atlanta, Georgia, Soloveychik placed 13th in the 500 free (4:13.51), 41st in the 200 free (1:34.32), and set the school record in the 500 free prelims (4:12.76).

At the 2022 Big Ten Men's Swimming and Diving Championships in West Lafayette, Indiana in February, he was a three-time finalist, as Soloveychik finished fourth in the 500 y free finals (a school record 4:13.85), fifth in the 200 y free finals (1:33.80), and eighth in the 1650 y free (15:00.14). He was also part of the 800 free relay that placed fifth (6:22.25), leading off with a school record 1:33.56 in the 200 free.

Soloveychik was named College Swimming Coaches Association of America (CSCAA) 2021-22 First Team Scholar All-American He was named 2022 Honorable Mention All-American.

At the May 2022 Israel Swimming Cup in Netanya, Israel, Soloveychik won the 400 freestyle in a time of 3:51.95.

=== 2023–present ===
In his sophomore season at Minnesota in 2022–23, at the Big Ten championships he came in second in the 500 free (4:14.45) and the 1650 free (14:50.93). He was named a CSC Academic All-District honoree, an Academic All-Big Ten honoree, and a CSCAA First Team Scholar All-American.

At the Israel Adults Championships - Criteria Competition in June 2023 he won a gold medal in the Men 400m Freestyle (3:48.55), and a silver medal in the 800m Freestyle (7:57.26).

In his junior season in 2023–24, at the Big Ten championships he came in second in both the 500 free (4:11.49) and the 1650 free (14:45.59). He was named an All-American in the 1650 free, Honorable Mention All-American in the 500 free, Second Team All-Big Ten, Third Team Academic All-American, and an Academic All-Big Ten. He holds the university records in the 200 Free (1:33.41), 500 Free (4:11.33), 1000 free (8:52.95), 1650 free (14:41.40), and 800 free relay (6:16.25).

At the Israel Olympic Trials in June 2024 he won gold medals in the 200m Freestyle (1:47.57), 400m Freestyle (3:47.32), and 800m Freestyle (7:56.90).

His personal best in the 200 metre freestyle is 1:47.28, which he swam at the Israeli Olympic Trials, on June 7, 2024.

=== 2024 Paris Olympics ===
Soloveychik represented Israel at the 2024 Paris Olympics in the Men's 4×200 metre freestyle relay. He is the second Minnesota Gopher male ever to swim for Israel at the Olympics, joining Yoav Meiri who did so in 2000.

== See also ==
- List of Israeli records in swimming
