= Tom Dean (swimmer) =

English swimmer (born 2000)

Tom Dean MBE
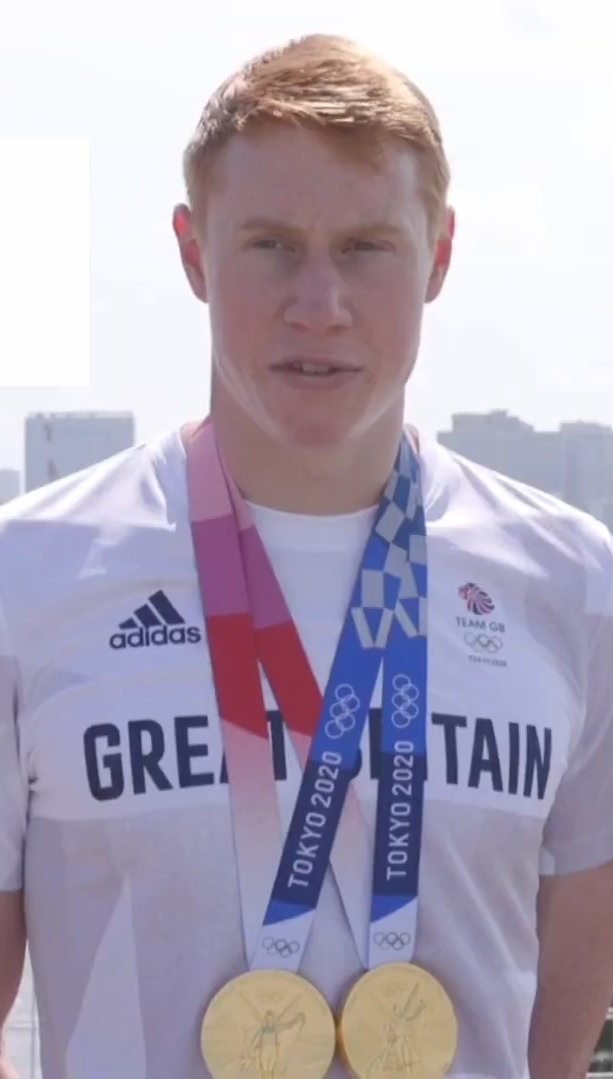
- Dean at the 2020 Summer Olympics

Personal information
- Full name: Thomas William Darnton Dean
- National team: Great Britain; England
- Born: 2 May 2000 (age 26) London, England
- Height: 1.94 m (6 ft 4 in)
- Weight: 88 kg (194 lb)

Sport
- Sport: Swimming
- Strokes: Medley, freestyle
- Club: Bath National Centre
- Coach: David McNulty
Medal record
Men's swimming
Representing Great Britain
Olympic Games
Gold medal – first place	2020 Tokyo	200 m freestyle
Gold medal – first place	2020 Tokyo	4×200 m freestyle
Gold medal – first place	2024 Paris	4×200 m freestyle
World Championships (LC)
Gold medal – first place	2023 Fukuoka	4×200 m freestyle
Gold medal – first place	2025 Singapore	4×200 m freestyle
Silver medal – second place	2023 Fukuoka	200 m freestyle
Bronze medal – third place	2022 Budapest	200 m freestyle
Bronze medal – third place	2022 Budapest	4×200 m freestyle
Bronze medal – third place	2022 Budapest	4×100 m medley
Bronze medal – third place	2023 Fukuoka	200 m medley
Bronze medal – third place	2023 Fukuoka	4×100 m mixed freestyle
World Championships (SC)
Bronze medal – third place	2022 Melbourne	200 m freestyle
European Championships (LC)
Gold medal – first place	2018 Glasgow	4×200 m freestyle
Gold medal – first place	2020 Budapest	4×100 m mixed freestyle
Gold medal – first place	2020 Budapest	4×200 m mixed freestyle
Gold medal – first place	2020 Budapest	4×100 m medley
Gold medal – first place	2022 Rome	4×200 m mixed freestyle
Gold medal – first place	2026 Paris	4×200 m freestyle
Silver medal – second place	2020 Budapest	4×100 m freestyle
Silver medal – second place	2020 Budapest	4×200 m freestyle
Silver medal – second place	2022 Rome	4×100 m mixed freestyle
Bronze medal – third place	2020 Budapest	200 m freestyle
Bronze medal – third place	2022 Rome	4×100 m freestyle
European Championships (SC)
Silver medal – second place	2019 Glasgow	400 m freestyle
European Junior Championships
Gold medal – first place	2018 Helsinki	200 m medley
Gold medal – first place	2017 Netanya	200 m medley
Silver medal – second place	2017 Netanya	400 m medley
Bronze medal – third place	2018 Helsinki	4×200 m freestyle
Bronze medal – third place	2018 Helsinki	400 m medley
Representing England
Commonwealth Games
Gold medal – first place	2022 Birmingham	4×100 m medley
Silver medal – second place	2022 Birmingham	100 m freestyle
Silver medal – second place	2022 Birmingham	200 m freestyle
Silver medal – second place	2022 Birmingham	200 m medley
Silver medal – second place	2022 Birmingham	4×100 m freestyle
Silver medal – second place	2022 Birmingham	4×200 m freestyle
Silver medal – second place	2022 Birmingham	4×100 m mixed freestyle
Silver medal – second place	2026 Glasgow	4×100 m freestyle
Bronze medal – third place	2026 Glasgow	200 m medley
Commonwealth Youth Games
Gold medal – first place	2017 Nassau	200 m medley
Silver medal – second place	2017 Nassau	400 m medley

Thomas William Darnton Dean (born 2 May 2000) is a British competitive freestyle swimmer. He is a triple Olympic gold medallist, winning gold individually in 200 metre freestyle at the 2020 Summer Olympics and as part of a team in 4 × 200 m freestyle relay at the 2020 Summer Olympics and the 2024 Summer Olympics.

Dean has represented Great Britain at the European Junior Championships and the European Championships. He also competed at the 2020 European Championships where he won three gold and two silver medals in the team events and one individual bronze in 200m freestyle. Dean has won relay gold at all four major events available to him – at the World Championships, Olympic Games and European Championships and, for England, at the Commonwealth Games.

== Early life ==
Dean was born to Jacquie Hughes and Jonathan Dean in London, the second of five children. He grew up in Maidenhead, Berkshire, and was a pupil at the Sir William Borlase's Grammar School in Marlow, Buckinghamshire. He took up swimming when he was eight, and joined the Maidenhead Marlins. He went to study mechanical engineering at the University of Bath in 2018 while training at the National Centre for Swimming in Bath.

== Career ==
At the 2017 European Junior Championships, Dean won the gold medal in the 200m Individual Medley and the silver medal in the 400m Individual Medley. At the 2018 European Junior Championships, Dean retained the gold medal in the 200m Individual Medley, breaking a European Junior record in the process. He also won two bronze medals, in the 400m Individual Medley and the 4 × 200 m Freestyle relay.

Dean was selected for the British team for the 2018 European Championships, his first senior competition, where he participated in the 200m Individual medley, 400m Individual medley, and won gold as part of the 4 × 200 m freestyle team.

=== 2021 – Olympic gold medals ===
In May 2021, Dean won gold as part of a team in mixed 4 × 100 metre and mixed 4 × 200 metre freestyle, as well as silver in the men's 4 × 100 metre freestyle and 4 × 200 metre freestyle relays at the European Championships. He also won an individual bronze medal in the 200m freestyle.

On 27 July 2021, at the 2020 Summer Olympic Games in Tokyo, Dean won the gold medal in the 200m freestyle, with his teammate Duncan Scott winning the silver medal. He then won gold in the men's 4 × 200 metre freestyle relay together with James Guy, Duncan Scott, and Matt Richards in a time of six minutes 58.58 seconds. Dean became the first male British swimmer to win two gold Olympic medals at the same games in 113 years, a feat later equalled in the same week by James Guy and Adam Peaty.

Dean was appointed Member of the Order of the British Empire (MBE) in the 2022 New Year Honours for services to swimming.

=== 2022 ===
At the 2022 World Aquatics Championships, Dean won the bronze medal in the 200 metre freestyle with a time of 1:44.98. His bronze medal was the first medal won by a swimmer representing Great Britain at the 2022 World Aquatics Championships. He won his second bronze medal of the Championships in the 4×200 metre freestyle relay, splitting a 1:43.53 for the anchor leg of the relay to finish in a final time of 7:04.00. In the 4×100 metre medley relay he won his third bronze medal of the Championships, helping achieve a third-place finish in the final in 3:31.31 by swimming the anchor leg of the relay in 47.45 seconds.

Also in 2022, he was part of the team that won the gold medal in the Men's 4 × 100 metre medley relay at the 2022 Commonwealth Games in Birmingham.

=== 2023 ===
In 2023, he won the gold medal at the 2023 British Swimming Championships in the 200 metres medley. It was the first time he had won the 200 metres event and his second British title, having previously won the 400 metres event in 2018. At the subsequent World Championships, Dean won four medals; his first World Championship gold in the men's 4 x 200 metre freestyle relay, silver in the 200 metres freestyle behind teammate Matt Richards, bronze behind Léon Marchand of France, and teammate Duncan Scott in the 200 metres individual medley and a further bronze in the mixed 4 x 100 metre freestyle relay behind Australia and the United States.

=== 2024 ===
After finishing second in the 200 metres medley at the 2024 Aquatics GB Swimming Championships, Dean recorded a time that met the British Consideration criteria for a place at the 2024 Summer Olympics and was subsequently named in the British team for the Olympics. Dean did not qualify to defend his individual 200m freestyle at the Paris Olympics. In the men's 4 × 200 metre freestyle relay, the same quartet of British swimmers who won in the same event at the Tokyo Olympics – James Guy, Duncan Scott, Matt Richards and Dean – swam in the final. They won the relay with a time of six minutes and 59.43 seconds, becoming the first team to successfully defend an Olympic swimming relay title with the same four swimmers. They are also the first British team to have defended an Olympic relay title in swimming or athletics. Following their win, Dean confirmed he would be participating in the twenty-second series of Strictly Come Dancing. Dean was partnered with Nadiya Bychkova and they were the first couple eliminated in week two, after losing the dance-off to Toyah Willcox and Neil Jones.
