= Matt Richards (swimmer) =

British swimmer (born 2002)

Matthew Richards MBE
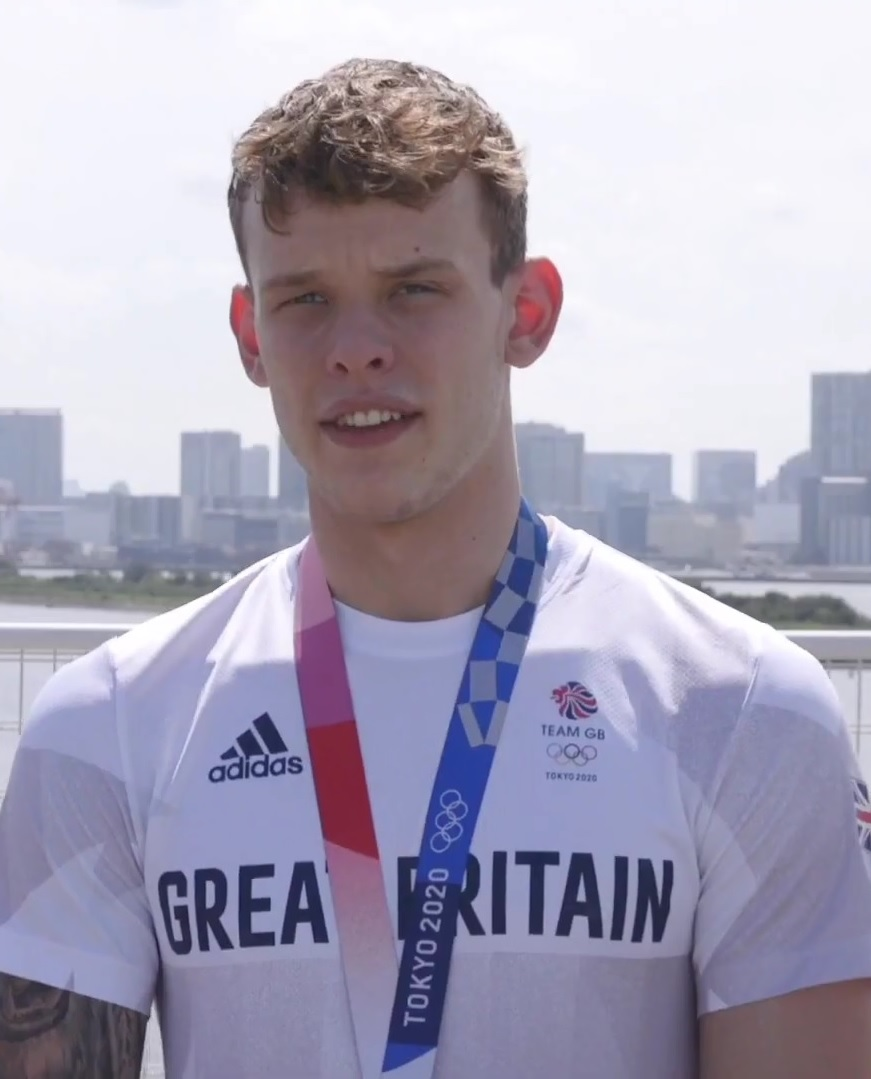
- Richards in 2021

Personal information
- Nationality: British
- Born: 17 December 2002 (age 23) Droitwich Spa, Worcestershire, England
- Height: 1.88 m (6 ft 2 in)
- Weight: 90 kg (198 lb)
- Spouse: Emily Large (m. 2024)

Sport
- Sport: Swimming
- Strokes: Freestyle
- Club: AP Race Academy
Medal record
Men's swimming
Representing Great Britain
Event	1st	2nd	3rd
Olympic Games	2	1	0
World Championships (LC)	3	0	3
European Championships (LC)	4	3	1
European Championships (SC)	2	1	0
Total	11	5	4
Olympic Games
Gold medal – first place	2020 Tokyo	4×200 m freestyle
Gold medal – first place	2024 Paris	4×200 m freestyle
Silver medal – second place	2024 Paris	200 m freestyle
World Championships (LC)
Gold medal – first place	2023 Fukuoka	200 m freestyle
Gold medal – first place	2023 Fukuoka	4×200 m freestyle
Gold medal – first place	2025 Singapore	4×200 m freestyle
Bronze medal – third place	2022 Budapest	4×200 m freestyle
Bronze medal – third place	2023 Fukuoka	4×100 m mixed freestyle
Bronze medal – third place	2024 Doha	4×100 m mixed medley
European Championships (LC)
Gold medal – first place	2020 Budapest	4×100 m mixed freestyle
Gold medal – first place	2022 Rome	4×200 m mixed freestyle
Gold medal – first place	2026 Paris	4×200 m freestyle
Gold medal – first place	2026 Paris	4×200 m mixed freestyle
Silver medal – second place	2020 Budapest	4×100 m freestyle
Silver medal – second place	2020 Budapest	4×200 m freestyle
Silver medal – second place	2022 Rome	4×100 m mixed freestyle
Bronze medal – third place	2022 Rome	4×100 m freestyle
European Championships (SC)
Gold medal – first place	2023 Otopeni	200 m freestyle
Gold medal – first place	2023 Otopeni	4x50 m freestyle
Silver medal – second place	2023 Otopeni	4×50 m medley
Bronze medal – third place	2025 Lublin	100 m freestyle
European Junior Championships
Gold medal – first place	2019 Kazan	100 m freestyle
Silver medal – second place	2019 Kazan	200 m freestyle
Bronze medal – third place	2019 Kazan	4x100 m freestyle
Representing Wales
Commonwealth Games
Silver medal – second place	2026 Glasgow	100m freestyle
Silver medal – second place	2026 Glasgow	200m freestyle
Bronze medal – third place	2026 Glasgow	4×100 m mixed freestyle
Bronze medal – third place	2026 Glasgow	4×200 m freestyle

Matthew Richards (born 17 December 2002) is a British swimmer specialising in 100 and 200 metre freestyle, active internationally from 2020. He won the gold medal in the 200 metre freestyle at 2023 World Aquatics Championships, a silver in the 200 m freestyle at the 2024 Summer Olympics, Olympic gold in the 4 x 200 metre freestyle relay at the 2020 Summer Olympics and World gold in the same event at the 2023 World Championships.

Richards swam the third leg of the gold-medal winning Great Britain 4 x 200 metre freestyle relay at the 2020 Summer Olympics, the first British team to win the event since 1908. Previously, he had won two silver medals in team freestyle relays at the European Championships. In 2023 he won the British Championships in the 200 metres for the first time, holding off Olympic champion Tom Dean, former World Champion James Guy and multiple Olympic and World medalist Duncan Scott, all teammates from the 2020 relay squad. In July 2023, Richards again held off Dean as well as defending World champion David Popovici to win the gold medal in the 2023 World Championships, before following up with gold in the men's 4 x 200 metre freestyle relay and bronze in the mixed 4 x 100 metre freestyle relay. In 2026, he represented Wales at the Commonwealth Games, becoming the first swimmer competing for Wales to win four medals in a single Games.

== Early life ==
Richards was born in Droitwich, Worcestershire, England, to Amanda and Simon Richards. He started swimming when he was five years old at Droitwich Leisure Centre, and joined the Droitwich Dolphins Swimming Club when he was eight, later moving to Worcester Swimming Club aged ten. He played other sports such as rugby and tae kwon do but gave them up to concentrate on swimming.

== Career ==
Although born in England, Richards represented Wales as his father was born there. He broke the Welsh records in 100 and 200 metre freestyle. He became the junior champion in 100 m freestyle at the 2019 European Junior Swimming Championships held in Kazan.

He competed in the men's 100 metre freestyle event at the 2020 European Aquatics Championships, in Budapest, Hungary, and won two silver as part of the British team in the men's 4 × 100 metre freestyle and 4 × 200 metre freestyle relays. He was also part of the team that won gold in 4×100 m mixed freestyle, although he swam in the heats and did not swim in the finals.

At the 2020 Tokyo Olympics, he was in the men's 4 × 200 metre freestyle relay together with James Guy, Duncan Scott, and Tom Dean. He swam the third leg in 1 minute 45.01 seconds, a performance that helped the team win gold with a time of six minutes 58.58 seconds. The gold is Britain's first in 4 × 200 metre freestyle relay at the Olympics since 1908.

In 2023, he won the gold medal at the 2023 British Swimming Championships in the 200 metres freestyle. He won gold in the 200m freestyle as well as the 4 × 200 metre freestyle relay at the 2023 World Aquatics Championships held in Japan.

After winning both the 100 metres freestyle and the 200 metres freestyle at the 2024 Aquatics GB Swimming Championships, Richards sealed his place at the 2024 Summer Olympics.

At the 2024 Summer Olympics held in Paris, Richards was only the seventh fastest qualifier for the 200 m freestyle final. However, Richards swam a fast race in the final, and was beaten to second place by only 0.02 of a second by David Popovici. In the Men's 4 × 200 metre freestyle relay, the same four quartet of British swimmers who won in the same event at the Tokyo Olympics, James Guy, Duncan Scott, Tom Dean and Richards contested in the final. They won the relay with a time of six minutes and 59.43 seconds, and became the first team to have successfully defended an Olympic swimming relay title with the same four swimmers. They are also the first British team to have defended an Olympic relay title in swimming or athletics.

Shortly after the Olympics on 22 August 2024, Richards married fellow Team GB swimmer Emily Large. In 2025, Richards successfully defended his 100 metres freestyle title at the 2025 Aquatics GB Swimming Championships, which sealed a qualification place for the 2025 World Aquatics Championships in Singapore. Subsequently at the World Championships, he won the gold medal as part of the 4x200 metres freestyle team, alongside James Guy, Jack McMillan and Duncan Scott.

== Awards ==
Richards was appointed Member of the Order of the British Empire (MBE) in the 2022 New Year Honours for services to swimming.
