= 2016 FINA World Swimming Championships (25 m) – Men's 400 metre freestyle =

Men's 400 metre freestyle at the 2016 FINA World Swimming Championships (25 m)
- Venue: WFCU Centre
- Dates: 6 December (heats and final)
- Competitors: 72 from 54 nations
- Winning time: 3:34.59

Medalists
gold medal	Park Tae-hwan	South Korea
silver medal	Aleksandr Krasnykh	Russia
bronze medal	Péter Bernek	Hungary

The Men's 400 metre freestyle competition of the 2016 FINA World Swimming Championships (25 m) was held on 6 December 2016, in Ontario, Canada.

== Records ==
Prior to the competition, the existing world and championship records were as follows.

	Name	Nation	Time	Location	Date
World record	Yannick Agnel	France	3:32.25	Angers	15 November 2012
Championship record	Péter Bernek	Hungary	3:34.32	Doha	5 December 2014

== Results ==
=== Heats ===
The heats were held at 09:30.

Rank	Heat	Lane	Name	Nationality	Time	Notes
1	7	5	Alexander Krasnykh	Russia	3:38.40	Q
2	7	9	Park Tae-Hwan	South Korea	3:38.47	Q
3	7	3	Zane Grothe	United States	3:38.70	Q
4	8	4	Péter Bernek	Hungary	3:39.08	Q
5	7	6	Jordan Pothain	France	3:39.31	Q
6	8	3	Wojciech Wojdak	Poland	3:40.49	Q
7	7	2	Maarten Brzoskowski	Netherlands	3:40.80	Q
8	8	2	Stephen Milne	Great Britain	3:40.87	Q
9	8	5	Henrik Christiansen	Norway	3:41.18	
10	8	6	Myles Brown	South Africa	3:41.49	
11	8	1	Daniel Smith	Australia	3:42.02	
12	7	4	Gabriele Detti	Italy	3:42.58	
13	6	9	Max Litchfield	Great Britain	3:42.98	
14	7	0	Katsuhiro Matsumoto	Japan	3:43.32	
15	6	5	Felix Auböck	Austria	3:43.42	
16	8	7	Poul Zellmann	Germany	3:44.09	
17	6	2	Qiu Ziao	China	3:44.43	
17	6	3	Reed Malone	United States	3:44.43	
19	7	8	Victor Johansson	Sweden	3:44.63	
20	6	7	Lucas Kanieski	Brazil	3:45.38	
21	5	6	Jeremy Bagshaw	Canada	3:45.54	
22	6	8	Frans Johannessen	Denmark	3:45.56	
23	7	7	Adam Paulsson	Sweden	3:45.99	
24	6	0	Richárd Nagy	Slovakia	3:46.28	
25	6	1	Richárd Márton	Hungary	3:46.52	
26	8	9	Martin Bau	Slovenia	3:46.77	
27	6	4	Lander Hendrickx	Belgium	3:46.91	
28	4	1	Peter Brothers	Canada	3:46.99	
28	5	2	Jordan Sloan	Ireland	3:46.99	
30	8	8	Yuki Kobori	Japan	3:47.25	
31	5	4	Brent Szurdoki	South Africa	3:47.29	
32	5	5	Florian Wellbrock	Germany	3:47.30	
33	3	3	Fernando Scheffer	Brazil	3:47.42	
34	7	1	Jan Micka	Czech Republic	3:47.47	
DSQ (35)	5	8	Artem Lobuzov	Russia	~~3:47.67~~	
36	5	1	Marcus Krøyer	Denmark	3:48.20	
37	5	9	Erik Gidskehaug	Norway	3:48.27	
38	4	2	Wu Yuhang	China	3:48.45	
39	4	3	Bogdan Scarlat	Romania	3:49.18	
40	8	0	Joris Bouchaut	France	3:49.55	
41	3	6	Christian Punter	Puerto Rico	3:50.53	
42	4	8	Khader Baqlah	Jordan	3:50.58	
43	4	6	Pang Sheng Jun	Singapore	3:50.70	
44	6	6	Pál Joensen	Faroe Islands	3:50.95	
45	5	0	Michael Mincham	New Zealand	3:50.98	
46	4	5	Oil Mortensen	Faroe Islands	3:52.26	
47	4	7	Pit Brandenburger	Luxembourg	3:53.53	
48	3	3	Irakli Revishvili	Georgia	3:53.89	
49	1	3	Igor Mogne	Mozambique	3:54.44	
50	3	9	Cho Cheng-chi	Chinese Taipei	3:55.06	
51	3	5	Matías López	Paraguay	3:55.42	
52	3	2	Felipe Tapia	Chile	3:55.90	
53	3	4	Angelo Šimić	Bosnia and Herzegovina	3:57.75	
54	4	9	Alex Sobers	Barbados	3:58.13	
55	5	7	An Ting-yao	Chinese Taipei	3:59.29	
56	2	2	Jarod Alexander Arroyo	Puerto Rico	4:00.16	
57	3	7	Wesley Roberts	Cook Islands	4:00.17	NR
58	3	1	Dioser Nunez	Dominican Republic	4:00.65	
59	3	8	Lin Sizhuang	Macau	4:02.55	
60	2	1	Emilio Ávila	Guatemala	4:03.08	
61	4	0	Dominic Walter	Jamaica	4:03.16	
62	2	4	Antonio González	Costa Rica	4:03.35	
63	2	6	Brandon Schuster	Samoa	4:04.74	
64	2	3	Walter Caballero	Bolivia	4:07.73	
65	3	0	Constantinos Hadjittooulis	Cyprus	4:07.74	
66	2	5	Axel Ngui	Philippines	4:10.35	
67	2	7	Franci Aleksi	Albania	4:10.84	
68	1	4	Amir Amrollahi Biuoki	Iran	4:10.88	
69	4	4	Lâm Quang Nhật	Vietnam	4:14.36	
70	2	8	Frenc Berdaku	Albania	4:15.84	
71	2	0	Dean Hoffman	Seychelles	4:18.11	
72	2	9	Tanner Poppe	Guam	4:54.15	
	1	5	Oussama Mellouli	Tunisia	DNS	

=== Final ===
The final was held at 18:30.

Rank	Lane	Name	Nationality	Time	Notes
1st place, gold medalist(s)	5	Park Tae-hwan	South Korea	3:34.59	AS
2nd place, silver medalist(s)	4	Aleksandr Krasnykh	Russia	3:35.30	NR
3rd place, bronze medalist(s)	6	Péter Bernek	Hungary	3:37.65	
4	7	Wojciech Wojdak	Poland	3:37.90	
5	2	Jordan Pothain	France	3:39.35	
6	1	Maarten Brzoskowski	Netherlands	3:39.91	NR
7	3	Zane Grothe	United States	3:40.20	
8	8	Stephen Milne	Great Britain	3:43.63	
