= 2016 FINA World Swimming Championships (25 m) – Men's 200 metre freestyle =

Men's 200 metre freestyle at the 2016 FINA World Swimming Championships (25 m)
- Venue: WFCU Centre
- Dates: 7 December (heats and final)
- Competitors: 106 from 80 nations
- Winning time: 1:41.03 CR

Medalists
gold medal	Park Tae-hwan	South Korea
silver medal	Chad le Clos	South Africa
bronze medal	Aleksandr Krasnykh	Russia

The Men's 200 metre freestyle competition of the 2016 FINA World Swimming Championships (25 m) was held on 7 December 2016.

== Records ==
Prior to the competition, the existing world and championship records were as follows.

	Name	Nation	Time	Location	Date
World record	Paul Biedermann	Germany	1:39.37	Berlin	15 November 2009
Championship record	Ryan Lochte	United States	1:41.08	Dubai	15 December 2010

The following records were established during the competition:

Date	Event	Name	Nation	Time	Record
7 December	Final	Park Tae-hwan	South Korea	1:41.03	CR

== Results ==
=== Heats ===
The heats were held at 09:41.

Rank	Heat	Lane	Name	Nationality	Time	Notes
1	9	0	Dylan Carter	Trinidad and Tobago	1:42.90	Q, NR
2	11	4	Aleksandr Krasnykh	Russia	1:43.08	Q
3	11	5	Myles Brown	South Africa	1:43.50	Q
4	7	4	Matias Koski	Finland	1:43.68	Q
5	1	0	Anders Lie	Denmark	1:43.98	Q
5	10	4	Chad le Clos	South Africa	1:43.98	Q
7	9	8	Park Tae-hwan	South Korea	1:44.09	Q
8	10	5	Daniel Smith	Australia	1:44.20	Q
9	11	7	Luca Dotto	Italy	1:44.27	
10	9	4	Pieter Timmers	Belgium	1:44.29	
11	10	6	Maarten Brzoskowski	Netherlands	1:44.34	
12	10	1	Péter Bernek	Hungary	1:44.44	
13	9	7	Zane Grothe	United States	1:44.53	
14	11	6	Jordan Pothain	France	1:44.83	
15	9	6	Daiya Seto	Japan	1:44.93	
16	10	3	Mikhail Dovgalyuk	Russia	1:45.02	
17	8	0	Jordan Sloan	Ireland	1:45.16	
18	8	5	Danas Rapšys	Lithuania	1:45.19	
19	9	3	Stephen Milne	Great Britain	1:45.22	
20	9	5	Yuki Kobori	Japan	1:45.32	
21	8	7	Qian Zhiyong	China	1:45.34	
22	9	9	Markus Thormeyer	Canada	1:45.36	
23	8	1	Henrik Christiansen	Norway	1:45.53	
23	11	2	Kyle Stolk	Netherlands	1:45.53	
25	11	3	Fernando Scheffer	Brazil	1:45.54	
26	11	1	Jack Gerrard	Australia	1:45.63	
27	8	3	Shang Keyuan	China	1:45.69	
28	1	2	Simonas Bilis	Lithuania	1:45.81	
29	8	2	Daniel Skaaning	Denmark	1:46.04	
30	10	8	Felix Auböck	Austria	1:46.16	
31	8	8	Ádám Telegdy	Hungary	1:46.19	
32	10	9	Markus Lie	Norway	1:46.38	
33	8	4	Daniel Hunter	New Zealand	1:46.51	
34	7	2	Jeremy Bagshaw	Canada	1:46.54	
35	11	0	Reed Malone	United States	1:46.58	
36	11	9	Adam Paulsson	Sweden	1:46.79	
37	9	1	David Gamburg	Israel	1:46.88	
38	8	9	Cheung Kin Tat Kent	Hong Kong	1:46.93	
38	10	0	Poul Zellmann	Germany	1:46.93	
40	10	2	Khader Baqlah	Jordan	1:47.07	
41	7	5	Yeo Kai Quan	Singapore	1:47.08	
42	3	8	Gabriel Lopes	Portugal	1:47.31	
42	8	6	Miguel Nascimento	Portugal	1:47.31	
44	9	2	Ben Hockin	Paraguay	1:47.41	
45	11	8	Daniel Wallace	Great Britain	1:47.70	
46	6	3	Uvis Kalniņš	Latvia	1:47.73	
47	6	2	Mokhtar Al-Yamani	Yemen	1:47.78	
48	7	6	Pang Sheng Jun	Singapore	1:47.88	
49	7	3	Martin Bau	Slovenia	1:48.17	
50	1	7	Jean Dencausse	France	1:48.29	
51	7	8	Tomas Peribonio	Ecuador	1:48.48	
52	1	8	Igor Mogne	Mozambique	1:48.60	
53	7	7	Pit Brandenburger	Luxembourg	1:48.95	
54	6	7	An Ting-Yao	Chinese Taipei	1:49.24	
55	6	4	Vladimír Štefánik	Slovakia	1:49.32	
56	1	1	Teimuraz Kobakhidze	Georgia	1:49.54	
57	5	7	Alex Sobers	Barbados	1:49.69	
58	4	9	Kyle Abeysinghe	Sri Lanka	1:50.15	
59	6	5	Ilijan Malčić	Bosnia and Herzegovina	1:50.36	
60	5	5	Angelo Šimić	Bosnia and Herzegovina	1:50.37	
61	5	6	Wesley Roberts	Cook Islands	1:50.63	NR
62	7	0	Pál Joensen	Faroe Islands	1:50.69	
63	4	4	Christian Bayo Punter	Puerto Rico	1:51.08	
64	5	4	Oli Mortensen	Faroe Islands	1:51.12	
65	6	9	Matias Pinto	Chile	1:51.20	
66	4	1	Brandon Schuster	Samoa	1:51.26	
67	3	7	Gabriel Fleitas	Uruguay	1:51.39	
68	3	4	Alex Ngui	Philippines	1:51.40	
68	4	5	Dioser Nunez	Dominican Republic	1:51.40	
70	4	3	Sam Seghers	Papua New Guinea	1:52.08	
71	4	8	Kevin Avila Soto	Guatemala	1:52.22	
72	5	9	Irakli Revishvili	Georgia	1:52.23	
73	7	9	Dominic Walter	Jamaica	1:52.43	
74	6	1	Mathieu Marquet	Mauritius	1:52.44	
75	4	7	Lin Sizhuang	Macau	1:52.62	
76	5	1	Yeziel Morales Miranda	Puerto Rico	1:52.87	
77	5	0	Matt Galea	Malta	1:52.98	
78	4	6	Steven Maina	Kenya	1:53.23	
79	6	0	Mazen Elkamash	Egypt	1:53.37	
80	5	3	Xander Skinner	Namibia	1:53.47	
81	3	6	Adel Elfakir	Libya	1:53.50	
82	3	2	Said Saber	Morocco	1:53.72	
83	5	8	Jean-Luc Zephir	Saint Lucia	1:53.79	
84	3	0	Mathias Zacarias	Paraguay	1:53.90	
85	3	5	Antonio Gonzalez	Costa Rica	1:54.82	
86	6	8	Stanislav Karnaukhov	Kyrgyzstan	1:55.01	
87	2	4	Emilio Avila	Guatemala	1:55.55	
88	2	5	Jeremy Lim	Philippines	1:55.71	
89	6	6	Lâm Quang Nhật	Vietnam	1:56.23	
90	4	2	Constantinos Hadjittooulis	Cyprus	1:57.13	
91	3	9	Walter Caballero Quilla	Bolivia	1:57.32	
92	2	0	Stanford Kawale	Papua New Guinea	1:57.95	
93	2	6	Zandanbal Gunsennorov	Mongolia	1:58.03	
94	3	3	Eisner Barberena Espinoza	Nicaragua	1:59.64	
95	2	7	David Hitchcock	Gibraltar	2:00.53	
96	2	8	Dean Hoffman	Seychelles	2:01.05	
97	3	1	Franci Aleksi	Albania	2:01.26	
98	2	2	Stefano Mitchell	Antigua and Barbuda	2:02.27	
99	2	3	Nabeel Hatoum	Palau	2:03.30	
100	2	1	Josue Portillo	Honduras	2:05.12	
101	1	3	Temaruata Strickland	Cook Islands	2:06.04	
102	1	4	Tanner Poppe	Guam	2:06.36	
103	1	9	Tongli Panuve	Tonga	2:08.83	
104	1	5	Salofi Welch	Northern Mariana Islands	2:10.87	
105	2	9	Christian Villacrusis	Northern Mariana Islands	2:11.82	
106	1	6	Joseph Sumari	Tanzania	2:30.15	
	4	0	Bakr Salam Ali Al-Dulaimi	Iraq		DNS
	5	2	Joseph Macias Rubio	Ecuador		DNS
	7	1	Aleksey Tarasenko	Uzbekistan		DNS
	10	7	Christoffer Carlsen	Sweden		DNS

=== Final ===
The final was held at 19:23.

Rank	Lane	Name	Nationality	Time	Notes
1st place, gold medalist(s)	1	Park Tae-hwan	South Korea	1:41.03	CR, AS
2nd place, silver medalist(s)	7	Chad le Clos	South Africa	1:41.65	
3rd place, bronze medalist(s)	5	Aleksandr Krasnykh	Russia	1:41.95	
4	4	Dylan Carter	Trinidad and Tobago	1:42.48	NR
5	3	Myles Brown	South Africa	1:43.22	
5	8	Daniel Smith	Australia	1:43.22	
7	6	Matias Koski	Finland	1:43.51	
8	2	Anders Lie	Denmark	1:43.69	NR
