= 2016 FINA World Swimming Championships (25 m) – Men's 4 × 200 metre freestyle relay =

Men's 4 × 200 metre freestyle relay at the 2016 FINA World Swimming Championships (25 m)
- Venue: WFCU Centre
- Dates: 9 December (heats and final)
- Competitors: 82 from 20 nations
- Teams: 20
- Winning time: 6:53.34

Medalists
gold medal	Blake Pieroni; Jacob Pebley; Pace Clark; Zane Grothe	United States
silver medal	Yuki Kobori; Daiya Seto; Tsubasa Amai; Katsuhiro Matsumoto	Japan
bronze medal	Clyde Lewis; Mitch Larkin; Daniel Smith; Alexander Graham; Jack Gerrard	Australia

The Men's 4 × 200 metre freestyle relay competition of the 2016 FINA World Swimming Championships (25 m) was held on 9 December 2016.

== Records ==
Prior to the competition, the existing world and championship records were as follows.

	Nation	Time	Location	Date
World record Championship record	Russia	6:49.04	Dubai	16 December 2010

== Results ==
=== Heats ===
The heats were held at 11:18.

Rank	Heat	Lane	Nation	Swimmers	Time	Notes
1	1	4	United States	Blake Pieroni (1:43.37); Jacob Pebley (1:43.89); Pace Clark (1:44.05); Zane Grothe (1:42.60)	6:53.91	Q
2	3	8	Australia	Clyde Lewis (1:44.07); Alexander Graham (1:43.39); Daniel Smith (1:42.97); Jack Gerrard (1:44.29)	6:54.72	Q
3	1	5	Denmark	Sebastian Ovesen (1:43.93); Daniel Skaaning (1:44.01); Anders Lie (1:42.64); Frans Johannessen (1:44.30)	6:54.88	Q, NR
4	3	3	Japan	Yuki Kobori (1:44.36); Daiya Seto (1:44.54); Katsuhiro Matsumoto (1:44.01); Tsubasa Amai (1:44.58)	6:57.49	Q, AS
5	2	2	Russia	Daniil Pasynkov (1:45.37); Artem Lobuzov (1:44.79); Mikhail Dovgalyuk (1:44.19); Mikhail Vekovishchev (1:43.39)	6:57.74	Q
6	2	1	China	Qiu Ziao (1:46.01); Shang Keyuan (1:45.18); Qian Zhiyong (1:43.81); Wang Shun (1:43.03)	6:58.03	Q, NR
7	1	3	Netherlands	Dion Dreesens (1:44.86); Maarten Brzoskowski (1:44.56); Ben Schwietert (1:45.32); Kyle Stolk (1:43.81)	6:58.55	Q, NR
8	3	5	Great Britain	Adam Barrett (1:45.98); Mark Szaranek (1:46.01); Max Litchfield (1:44.49); Stephen Milne (1:44.55)	7:01.03	Q, WD
9	2	7	Belgium	Louis Croenen (1:45.14); Thomas Thijs (1:47.63); Pieter Timmers (1:42.51); Lorenz Weiremans (1:47.06)	7:02.34	Q
10	3	6	Sweden	Adam Paulsson (1:45.58); Christoffer Carlssen (1:45.60); Victor Johansson (1:45.62); Mattias Carlsson (1:45.55)	7:02.35	NR
11	3	7	Hungary	Péter Bernek (1:45.44); Ádám Telegdy (1:45.80); Richárd Márton (1:45.01); Tamás Kenderesi (1:47.41)	7:03.66	NR
12	2	8	Canada	Markus Thormeyer (1:45.76); Stefan Milosevic (1:46.25); Javier Acevedo (1:47.67); Jeremy Bagshaw (1:45.10)	7:04.78	
13	3	0	Portugal	Miguel Nascimento (1:46.56); Gabriel Lopes (1:46.99); Diogo Carvalho (1:46.31); Alexis Santos (1:45.07)	7:04.93	NR
14	3	1	Norway	Henrik Christiansen (1:45.40); Markus Lie (1:45.09); Truls Wigdel (1:46.86); Erik Arsland (1:47.84)	7:05.19	NR
15	3	9	France	Jordan Pothain (1:43.70); Oleg Garasymovytch (1:47.38); Jean Dencausse (1:48.97); Joris Bouchaut (1:46.93)	7:06.98	
16	2	5	Czech Republic	Jan Micka (1:47.09); Tomáš Franta (1:48.50); Jan Šefl (1:48.72); Tomáš Havránek (1:48.30)	7:12.61	
17	3	2	Chile	Matias Pinto (1:51.15); Felipe Quiroz Uteau (1:54.87); Felipe Tapia Salinas (1:52.89); Joaquin Sepulveda Parra (1:57.06)	7:35.97	
18	3	4	Costa Rica	Antonio Gonzales (1:55.29); Bryan Alvarez (1:55.90); Arnoldo Herrera (1:55.53); Esteban Araya (1:54.38)	7:41.10	NR
19	2	4	Macau	Lin Sizhuang (1:52.78); Ngou Pok Man (1:56.12); Yum Cheng Man (2:00.32); Chao Man Hou (1:56.83)	7:46.05	NR
20	2	6	Gibraltar	David Hitchcock (1:58.84); Colin Bensadon (1:55.61); James Sanderson (1:57.01); Matt Savitz (1:57.60)	7:49.06	NR
	2	0	South Africa			DNS
	2	3	Venezuela			DNS

=== Final ===
The final was held at 20:19.

Rank	Lane	Nation	Swimmers	Time	Notes
1st place, gold medalist(s)	4	United States	Blake Pieroni (1:43.14); Jacob Pebley (1:43.38); Pace Clark (1:44.16); Zane Grothe (1:42.66)	6:53.34	
2nd place, silver medalist(s)	6	Japan	Yuki Kobori (1:43.97); Daiya Seto (1:42.54); Tsubasa Amai (1:44.11); Katsuhiro Matsumoto (1:42.92)	6:53.54	AS
3rd place, bronze medalist(s)	5	Australia	Clyde Lewis (1:43.64); Mitch Larkin (1:45.20); Daniel Smith (1:41.58); Alexander Graham (1:43.30)	6:53.72	
4	3	Denmark	Sebastian Ovesen (1:44.75); Daniel Skaaning (1:44.15); Frans Johannessen (1:43.70); Anders Lie (1:41.89)	6:54.49	NR
5	1	Netherlands	Kyle Stolk (1:45.58); Maarten Brzoskowski (1:43.90); Ben Schwietert (1:46.27); Dion Dreesens (1:43.35)	6:59.10	
6	7	China	Qiu Ziao (1:45.37); Shang Keyuan (1:45.78); Qian Zhiyong (1:45.67); Wang Shun (1:44.75)	7:01.57	
7	8	Belgium	Louis Croenen (1:45.32); Thomas Thijs (1:46.66); Pieter Timmers (1:44.01); Lorenz Weiremans (1:46.37)	7:02.36	
DSQ	2	Russia	Mikhail Dovgalyuk (1:44.27); Mikhail Vekovishchev (1:42.86); Artem Lobuzov (1:44.04); Aleksandr Krasnykh (1:40.93)	~~6:52.10~~	^{[a]}

^{a} Russia initially won the gold medal in the event. However, in 2022, Artem Lobuzov was found guilty of a doping violation, so the Russian relay was retroactively disqualified and the medals were reallocated.
