= Swimming at the 2006 Asian Games – Men's 200 metre freestyle =

Men's 200 metre freestyle at the 2006 Asian Games
- Venue: Hamad Aquatic Centre
- Date: 3 December 2006
- Competitors: 35 from 21 nations

Medalists
gold medal	Park Tae-hwan	South Korea
silver medal	Zhang Lin	China
bronze medal	Daisuke Hosokawa	Japan

The men's 200m freestyle swimming event at the 2006 Asian Games was held on December 3, 2006 at the Hamad Aquatic Centre in Doha, Qatar.

== Schedule ==
All times are Arabia Standard Time (UTC+03:00)

Date	Time	Event
Sunday, 3 December 2006	10:28	Heats
Sunday, 3 December 2006	18:13	Final

== Records ==
Prior to this competition, the existing world, Asian and Games records were as follows.

World Record	Ian Thorpe (AUS)	1:44.06	Fukuoka, Japan	25 July 2001
Asian Record	Park Tae-hwan (KOR)	1:47.51	Victoria, Canada	17 August 2006
Games Record	Liu Yu (CHN)	1:49.29	Busan, South Korea	1 October 2002

== Results ==
=== Heats ===
Rank	Heat	Athlete	Time	Notes
1	5	Park Tae-hwan (KOR)	1:49.75	
2	5	Daisuke Hosokawa (JPN)	1:50.14	
3	3	Zhang Enjian (CHN)	1:50.71	
4	4	Zhang Lin (CHN)	1:50.96	
5	3	Lim Nam-gyun (KOR)	1:51.07	
6	4	Takamitsu Kojima (JPN)	1:51.47	
7	4	Bryan Tay (SIN)	1:53.04	
8	5	Daniel Bego (MAS)	1:54.37	
9	3	Virdhawal Khade (IND)	1:54.44	
10	3	Miguel Molina (PHI)	1:54.62	
11	4	Tang Sheng-chieh (TPE)	1:55.32	
12	4	Cheung Siu Hang (HKG)	1:55.57	
13	4	Timur Irgashev (UZB)	1:55.73	
14	5	Mohammad Madwa (KUW)	1:55.86	
15	4	Marcus Cheah (SIN)	1:55.99	
16	3	Tharnawat Thanakornworakiart (THA)	1:56.23	
17	1	Vyacheslav Titarenko (KAZ)	1:56.39	
18	5	Petr Vasiliev (UZB)	1:56.66	
19	3	Mohammad Bidarian (IRI)	1:56.84	
20	3	Waleed Al-Qahtani (KUW)	1:56.99	
21	5	Chen Te-tung (TPE)	1:57.96	
22	5	Soheil Maleka Ashtiani (IRI)	1:58.17	
23	5	Chung Kwok Ting (HKG)	1:58.55	
24	3	Anas Abu Yousuf (QAT)	1:58.87	
25	2	Daniel Lee (SRI)	2:01.02	
26	2	Moyssara El-Aarag (QAT)	2:01.03	
27	2	Heshan Unamboowe (SRI)	2:01.60	
28	2	Jamil Yamout (LIB)	2:01.89	
29	2	Rashid Iunusov (KGZ)	2:02.48	
30	2	Antonio Tong (MAC)	2:03.19	
31	4	Kendrick Uy (PHI)	2:04.80	
32	2	Lao Kuan Fong (MAC)	2:06.72	
33	2	Ali Adel (IRQ)	2:10.87	
34	1	Ali Majeed (IRQ)	2:17.00	
35	1	Ali Mohamed Raaidh (MDV)	2:30.12	

=== Final ===
Rank	Athlete	Time	Notes
1st place, gold medalist(s)	Park Tae-hwan (KOR)	1:47.12	AR
2nd place, silver medalist(s)	Zhang Lin (CHN)	1:47.85	
3rd place, bronze medalist(s)	Daisuke Hosokawa (JPN)	1:49.62	
4	Zhang Enjian (CHN)	1:49.92	
5	Takamitsu Kojima (JPN)	1:50.37	
6	Lim Nam-gyun (KOR)	1:51.67	
7	Bryan Tay (SIN)	1:52.09	
8	Daniel Bego (MAS)	1:56.25	
