= Swimming at the 2016 Summer Olympics – Men's 4 × 200 metre freestyle relay =

Men's 4 × 200 metre freestyle relay at the Games of the XXXI Olympiad
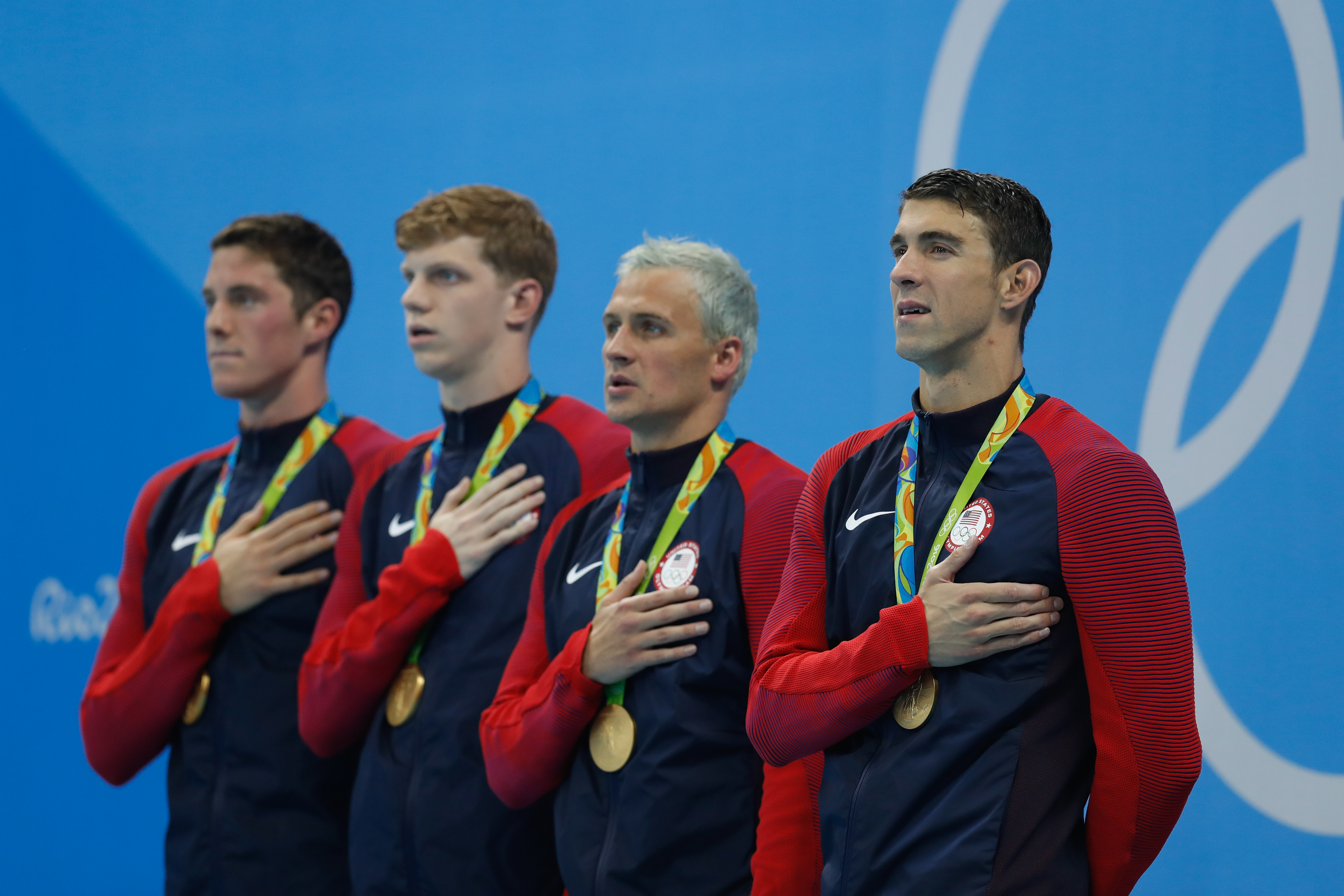
- The American final team (Dwyer, Haas, Lochte, and Phelps), during the medal ceremony.
- Venue: Olympic Aquatics Stadium
- Dates: 9 August 2016 (heats & final)
- Competitors: 73 from 16 nations
- Teams: 16
- Winning time: 7:00.66

Medalists
1st place, gold medalist(s)		Conor Dwyer, Townley Haas, Ryan Lochte, Michael Phelps, Clark Smith*, Jack Conger*, Gunnar Bentz*	United States
2nd place, silver medalist(s)		Stephen Milne, Duncan Scott, Daniel Wallace, James Guy, Robbie Renwick*	Australia
3rd place, bronze medalist(s)		Japan; Kosuke Hagino, Naito Ehara, Yuki Kobori, Takeshi Matsuda; *Indicates the swimmer only competed in the preliminary heats.	Japan

The men's 4 × 200 metre freestyle relay event at the 2016 Summer Olympics took place on 9 August at the Olympic Aquatics Stadium.

== Summary ==
After winning the 200 m butterfly title less than an hour earlier, the double gold rush continued for U.S. swimming icon Michael Phelps, as he helped his teammates Conor Dwyer, youngster Townley Haas, and eleven-time medalist Ryan Lochte solidify their historic seventeenth Olympic title in this event. The American foursome of Dwyer (1:45.23), Haas (1:44.14), Lochte (1:46.03), and Phelps (1:45.26) dominated the race from the start to put together a first-place finish in 7:00.26. As the Americans defended their Olympic title, Phelps also earned a twenty-first gold to raise his overall medal tally to twenty-five.

Great Britain's Stephen Milne (1:46.97), Duncan Scott (1:45.05), and Daniel Wallace (1:46.26) struggled to chase against the rest of the teams throughout the race, until anchor James Guy launched a late attack on the home stretch with a 1:44.85 split to deliver the British quartet a historic relay silver medal in 7:03.13. Meanwhile, Japan's Kosuke Hagino (1:45.34), along with his teammates Naito Ehara (1:46.11) and Yuki Kobori (1:45.71) held the runner-up spot for three-fourths of the race, but their anchor and four-time Olympian Takeshi Matsuda (1:46.34) could not keep off Guy towards a close finish, leaving the Japanese with a bronze in a final time of 7:03.50.

Australia's Thomas Fraser-Holmes (1:45.81), David McKeon (1:45.63), Daniel Smith (1:47.37), and Mack Horton (1:45.37) missed the podium by nearly three tenths of a second behind Japan, finishing with a fourth-place time in 7:04.18. The Russian team of Danila Izotov (1:46.72), Aleksandr Krasnykh (1:45.67), Nikita Lobintsev (1:46.31), and Mikhail Dovgalyuk (1:47.00) picked up the fifth spot in 7:05.70, with Germany (7:07.28), the Netherlands (7:09.10), and Belgium (7:11.64) following them by a couple of seconds to round out the top eight.

In the medal ceremony, the medals for the competition were presented by Karl Stoss, Austria, IOC member, and the gifts were presented by Pipat Panangvait, Thailand, Honorary Treasurer of FINA.

== Records ==
Prior to this competition, the existing world and Olympic records were as follows.

World record	United States (USA); Michael Phelps (1:44.49); Ricky Berens (1:44.13); David Walters (1:45.47); Ryan Lochte (1:44.46)	6:58.55	Rome, Italy	31 July 2009
Olympic record	United States; Michael Phelps (1:43.31); Ryan Lochte (1:44.28); Ricky Berens (1:46.29); Peter Vanderkaay (1:44.68)	6:58.56	Beijing, China	13 August 2008

== Competition format ==
The competition consisted of two rounds: heats and a final. The relay teams with the best 8 times in the heats advanced to the final. Swim-offs were used as necessary to break ties for advancement to the next round.

== Results ==
=== Heats ===
A total of sixteen countries have qualified to participate. The best eight from two heats advanced to the final.

Rank	Heat	Lane	Nation	Swimmers	Time	Notes
1	2	4	Great Britain	Stephen Milne (1:46.70); Robbie Renwick (1:48.17); Daniel Wallace (1:46.39); Duncan Scott (1:45.05)	7:06.31	Q
2	1	4	United States	Clark Smith (1:47.20); Jack Conger (1:45.73); Gunnar Bentz (1:48.01); Ryan Lochte (1:45.80)	7:06.74	Q
3	2	2	Russia	Mikhail Dovgalyuk (1:46.91); Vyacheslav Andrusenko (1:47.50); Nikita Lobintsev (1:46.42); Aleksandr Krasnykh (1:45.98)	7:06.81	Q
4	2	6	Germany	Florian Vogel (1:47.16); Jacob Heidtmann (1:47.17); Clemens Rapp (1:46.61); Paul Biedermann (1:46.72)	7:07.66	Q
5	2	7	Japan	Kosuke Hagino (1:46.60); Naito Ehara (1:47.12); Yuki Kobori (1:47.60); Takeshi Matsuda (1:46.36)	7:07.68	Q
6	2	5	Australia	Daniel Smith (1:47.55); Mack Horton (1:46.32); Jacob Hansford (1:47.70); Thomas Fraser-Holmes (1:46.41)	7:07.98	Q
7	2	3	Belgium	Louis Croenen (1:48.35); Dieter Dekoninck (1:46.57); Emmanuel Vanluchene (1:47.79); Glenn Surgeloose (1:46.01)	7:08.72	Q
8	1	5	Netherlands	Dion Dreesens (1:47.86); Kyle Stolk (1:47.13); Ben Schwietert (1:47.92); Maarten Brzoskowski (1:46.25)	7:09.16	Q
9	1	8	Italy	Andrea Mitchell D'Arrigo (1:47.65); Alex di Giorgio (1:47.74); Marco Belotti (1:47.01); Gabriele Detti (1:46.80)	7:09.20	
10	1	7	South Africa	Myles Brown (1:46.47); Sebastien Rousseau (1:48.35); Calvyn Justus (1:49.04); Dylan Bosch (1:48.75)	7:12.61	
11	1	2	Spain	Victor Martín (1:48.74); Miguel Durán (1:48.10); Albert Puig (1:48.13); Marc Sánchez (1:47.65)	7:12.62	
12	2	1	Denmark	Anders Lie Nielsen (1:47.62); Daniel Skaaning (1:46.78); Søren Dahl (1:47.43); Magnus Westermann (1:50.83)	7:12.66	NR
13	1	6	France	Jordan Pothain (1:46.56); Grégory Mallet (1:47.60); Lorys Bourelly (1:48.62); Damien Joly (1:50.93)	7:13.71	
14	1	1	Brazil	Luiz Altamir Melo (1:48.19); João de Lucca (1:47.77); André Pereira (1:49.19); Nicolas Oliveira (1:48.69)	7:13.84	
	1	3	Poland	Jan Świtkowski (1:47.95); Paweł Korzeniowski (1:48.14); Kacper Klich (1:49.52); Kacper Majchrzak (1:45.50)	~~7:11.11~~	DSQ
	2	8	Hungary	Péter Bernek (1:47.69); Gergő Kis (1:51.02); Benjámin Grátz (1:48.71); Dominik Kozma (1:51.09)	~~7:18.51~~	DSQ

=== Final ===
Rank	Lane	Nation	Swimmers	Time	Notes
1st place, gold medalist(s)	5	United States	Conor Dwyer (1:45.23); Townley Haas (1:44.14); Ryan Lochte (1:46.03); Michael Phelps (1:45.26)	7:00.66	
2nd place, silver medalist(s)	4	Great Britain	Stephen Milne (1:46.97); Duncan Scott (1:45.05); Daniel Wallace (1:46.26); James Guy (1:44.85)	7:03.13	NR
3rd place, bronze medalist(s)	2	Japan	Kosuke Hagino (1:45.34); Naito Ehara (1:46.11); Yuki Kobori (1:45.71); Takeshi Matsuda (1:46.34)	7:03.50	
4	7	Australia	Thomas Fraser-Holmes (1:45.81); David McKeon (1:45.63); Daniel Smith (1:47.37); Mack Horton (1:45.37)	7:04.18	
5	3	Russia	Danila Izotov (1:46.72); Aleksandr Krasnykh (1:45.67); Nikita Lobintsev (1:46.31); Mikhail Dovgalyuk (1:47.00)	7:05.70	
6	6	Germany	Florian Vogel (1:47.16); Christoph Fildebrandt (1:47.91); Clemens Rapp (1:46.12); Paul Biedermann (1:46.09)	7:07.28	
7	8	Netherlands	Dion Dreesens (1:47.58); Maarten Brzoskowski (1:46.87); Kyle Stolk (1:47.59); Sebastiaan Verschuren (1:47.06)	7:09.10	
8	1	Belgium	Louis Croenen (1:48.95); Dieter Dekoninck (1:47.50); Glenn Surgeloose (1:46.91); Pieter Timmers (1:48.28)	7:11.64	
