= Swimming at the 2015 World Aquatics Championships – Men's 4 × 200 metre freestyle relay =

Men's 4 × 200 metre freestyle relay at the 2015 World Aquatics Championships
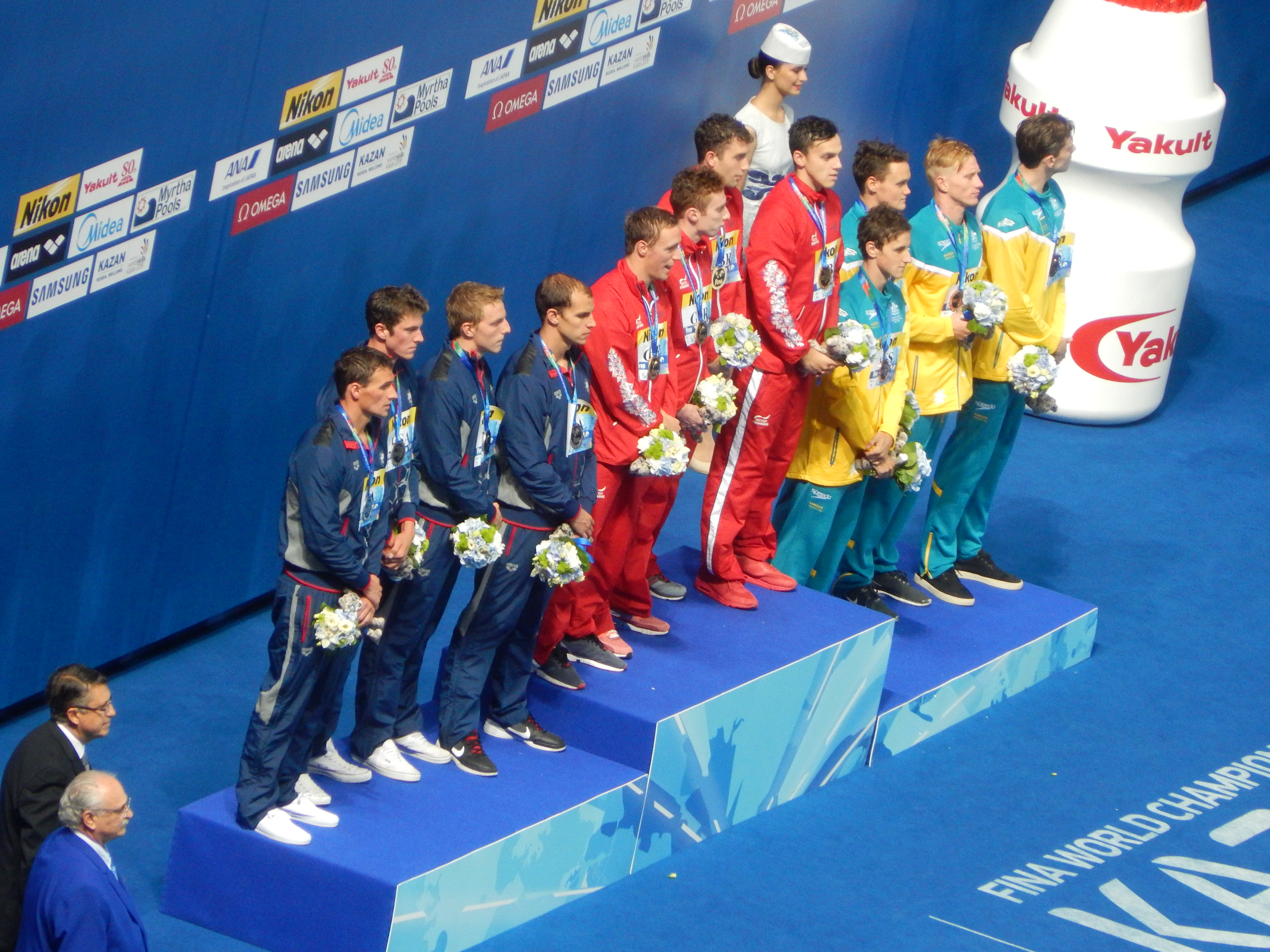
- Victory Ceremony
- Dates: 7 August (heats and final)
- Competitors: 96 from 22 nations
- Winning time: 7:04.33

Medalists
| gold medal | Daniel Wallace; Robert Renwick; Calum Jarvis; James Guy; Nicholas Grainger; Duncan Scott | Great Britain |
| silver medal | Ryan Lochte; Conor Dwyer; Reed Malone; Michael Weiss; Michael Klueh | United States |
| bronze medal | Cameron McEvoy; David McKeon; Daniel Smith; Thomas Fraser-Holmes; Grant Hackett; Kurt Herzog | Australia |

The Men's 4 × 200 metre freestyle relay competition of the swimming events at the 2015 World Aquatics Championships was held on 7 August with the heats and final.

== Records ==
Prior to the competition, the existing world and championship records were as follows.

| World record | United States | 6:58.55 | Rome, Italy | 31 July 2009 |
| Competition record | United States | 6:58.55 | Rome, Italy | 31 July 2009 |

== Results ==
=== Heats ===
The heats were held at 10:50

| Rank | Heat | Lane | Nation | Swimmers | Time | Notes |
|---|---|---|---|---|---|---|
| 1 | 2 | 3 | Australia | Grant Hackett (1:47.83); Kurt Herzog (1:47.96); Daniel Smith (1:46.02); Thomas Fraser-Holmes (1:46.59) | 7:08.40 | Q |
| 2 | 2 | 7 | United States | Reed Malone (1:48.21); Michael Weiss (1:46.14); Michael Klueh (1:47.67); Conor Dwyer (1:46.53) | 7:08.55 | Q |
| 3 | 2 | 1 | Great Britain | Robert Renwick (1:47.43); Nicholas Grainger (1:47.19); Daniel Wallace (1:46.03); Duncan Scott (1:48.35) | 7:09.00 | Q |
| 4 | 1 | 4 | Germany | Jacob Heidtmann (1:47.86); Florian Vogel (1:48.31); Clemens Rapp (1:47.14); Paul Biedermann (1:46.03) | 7:09.34 | Q |
| 5 | 1 | 5 | Poland | Jan Świtkowski (1:47.17); Kacper Klich (1:48.86); Michael Domagala (1:47.81); Kacper Majchrzak (1:46.36) | 7:10.20 | Q, NR |
| 6 | 3 | 9 | Netherlands | Dion Dreesens (1:47.73); Kyle Stolk (1:48.52); Joost Reijns (1:48.20); Sebastiaan Verschuren (1:46.38) | 7:10.83 | Q, NR |
| 7 | 3 | 0 | Russia | Nikita Lobintsev (1:48.29); Aleksandr Krasnykh (1:46.99); Mikhail Dovgalyuk (1:47.59); Artem Lobuzov (1:47.97) | 7:10.84 | Q |
| 8 | 2 | 9 | Belgium | Louis Croenen (1:48.74); Glenn Surgeloose (1:47.48); Dieter Dekoninck (1:47.45); Pieter Timmers (1:47.25) | 7:10.92 | Q |
| 9 | 2 | 2 | Spain | Miguel Duran (1:49.45); Victor Martin (1:46.92); Albert Puig (1:48.04); Marc Sánchez (1:46.98) | 7:11.39 | NR |
| 10 | 3 | 8 | Japan | Yuki Kobori (1:47.51); Tsubasa Amai (1:48.56); Naito Ehara (1:47.64); Daiya Seto (1:47.88) | 7:11.59 | |
| 11 | 3 | 7 | France | Jordan Pothain (1:48.34); Grégory Mallet (1:48.41); Lorys Bourelly (1:47.45); Clément Mignon (1:48.48) | 7:12.68 | |
| 12 | 3 | 4 | Denmark | Daniel Skaaning (1:48.71); Magnus Westermann (1:49.72); Søren Dahl (1:48.55); Anders Lie (1:46.74) | 7:13.72 | NR |
| 13 | 3 | 5 | Italy | Gianluca Maglia (1:48.64); Marco Belotti (1:49.44); Damiano Lestingi (1:47.91); Filippo Magnini (1:47.78) | 7:13.77 | |
| 14 | 2 | 5 | China | Xu Qiheng (1:49.71); He Tianqi (1:49.93); Shang Keyuan (1:48.37); Zhang Jie (1:48.66) | 7:16.67 | |
| 15 | 2 | 0 | Brazil | Luiz Altamir Melo (1:48.80); João de Lucca (1:50.25); Thiago Pereira (1:49.45); Nicolas Oliveira (1:48.35) | 7:16.85 | |
| 16 | 2 | 8 | Switzerland | Alexandre Haldemann (1:48.90); Nils Liess (1:49.99); Jérémy Desplanches (1:49.50); Jean-Baptiste Febo (1:49.60) | 7:17.99 | NR |
| 17 | 3 | 1 | Austria | Felix Auböck (1:48.30); David Brandl (1:48.66); Sebastian Steffan (1:50.51); Christian Scherübl (1:51.50) | 7:18.97 | |
| 18 | 2 | 6 | Serbia | Stefan Šorak (1:50.67); Velimir Stjepanović (1:46.08); Uroš Nikolić (1:51.87); Vuk Čelić (1:51.67) | 7:20.29 | |
| 19 | 1 | 6 | Ukraine | Illia Teslenko (1:49.34); Mykhailo Romanchuk (1:51.14); Serhiy Frolov (1:50.18); Anton Goncharov (1:51.08) | 7:21.74 | |
| 20 | 3 | 2 | Egypt | Marwan El-Kamash (1:49.36); Mohamed Khaled (1:50.64); Akram Ahmed (1:50.04); Ahmed Hamdy (1:51.82) | 7:21.86 | |
| 21 | 1 | 3 | Turkey | Nezir Karap (1:50.00); Doğa Çelik (1:49.75); Kaan Türker Ayar (1:51.58); Kemal Arda Gürdal (1:50.82) | 7:22.15 | |
| 22 | 2 | 4 | Venezuela | Cristian Quintero (1:48.04); Marcos Lavado (1:49.94); Daniele Tirabassi (1:52.23); Andy Arteta (1:54.92) | 7:25.13 | |
| | 3 | 3 | India | | | DNS |
| | 3 | 6 | Singapore | | | DNS |

=== Final ===
The final was held at 19:11.

| Rank | Lane | Nation | Swimmers | Time | Notes |
|---|---|---|---|---|---|
| 1st place, gold medalist(s) | 3 | Great Britain | Daniel Wallace (1:47.04); Robert Renwick (1:45.98); Calum Jarvis (1:46.57); James Guy (1:44.74) | 7:04.33 | NR |
| 2nd place, silver medalist(s) | 5 | United States | Ryan Lochte (1:45.71); Conor Dwyer (1:45.33); Reed Malone (1:46.92); Michael Weiss (1:46.79) | 7:04.75 | |
| 3rd place, bronze medalist(s) | 4 | Australia | Cameron McEvoy (1:46.46); David McKeon (1:47.05); Daniel Smith (1:46.38); Thomas Fraser-Holmes (1:45.45) | 7:05.34 | |
| 4 | 1 | Russia | Danila Izotov (1:46.25); Aleksandr Krasnykh (1:45.64); Mikhail Dovgalyuk (1:47.45); Alexandr Sukhorukov (1:47.55) | 7:06.89 | |
| 5 | 6 | Germany | Jacob Heidtmann (1:47.94); Clemens Rapp (1:46.88); Christoph Fildebrandt (1:49.39); Paul Biedermann (1:44.80) | 7:09.01 | |
| 6 | 8 | Belgium | Louis Croenen (1:48.43); Glenn Surgeloose (1:47.41); Dieter Dekoninck (1:47.29); Pieter Timmers (1:46.51) | 7:09.64 | NR |
| 7 | 7 | Netherlands | Dion Dreesens (1:47.20); Kyle Stolk (1:48.87); Joost Reijns (1:47.55); Sebastiaan Verschuren (1:46.13) | 7:09.75 | NR |
| 8 | 2 | Poland | Jan Świtkowski (1:47.03); Kacper Klich (1:49.33); Michael Domagala (1:46.90); Kacper Majchrzak (1:47.08) | 7:10.34 | |
