= Swimming at the 2006 Asian Games – Men's 400 metre freestyle =

Men's 400 metre freestyle at the 2006 Asian Games
- Venue: Hamad Aquatic Centre
- Date: 5 December 2006
- Competitors: 26 from 18 nations

Medalists
| gold medal | Park Tae-hwan | South Korea |
| silver medal | Zhang Lin | China |
| bronze medal | Takeshi Matsuda | Japan |

The men's 400m freestyle swimming event at the 2006 Asian Games was held on December 5, 2006 at the Hamad Aquatic Centre in Doha, Qatar.

== Schedule ==
All times are Arabia Standard Time (UTC+03:00)

| Date | Time | Event |
|---|---|---|
| Tuesday, 5 December 2006 | 10:22 | Heats |
| Tuesday, 5 December 2006 | 18:10 | Final |

== Records ==
Prior to this competition, the existing world, Asian and Games records were as follows.

| World Record | Ian Thorpe (AUS) | 3:40.08 | Manchester, United Kingdom | 30 July 2002 |
| Asian Record | Park Tae-hwan (KOR) | 3:45.72 | Victoria, Canada | 20 August 2006 |
| Games Record | Shunichi Fujita (JPN) | 3:50.41 | Busan, South Korea | 2 October 2002 |

== Results ==
Legend

- DNS — Did not start

=== Heats ===
| Rank | Heat | Athlete | Time | Notes |
|---|---|---|---|---|
| 1 | 2 | Zhang Lin (CHN) | 3:54.09 | |
| 2 | 3 | Takeshi Matsuda (JPN) | 3:55.36 | |
| 3 | 4 | Park Tae-hwan (KOR) | 3:56.46 | |
| 4 | 3 | Kang Yong-hwan (KOR) | 3:57.42 | |
| 5 | 2 | Kenichi Doki (JPN) | 3:58.20 | |
| 6 | 4 | Zhang Enjian (CHN) | 3:59.62 | |
| 7 | 2 | Daniel Bego (MAS) | 4:01.17 | |
| 8 | 3 | Tharnawat Thanakornworakiart (THA) | 4:01.92 | |
| 9 | 3 | Marcus Cheah (SIN) | 4:03.94 | |
| 10 | 4 | Naeem Al-Masri (SYR) | 4:05.17 | |
| 11 | 4 | Tang Sheng-chieh (TPE) | 4:05.18 | |
| 12 | 3 | Ryan Arabejo (PHI) | 4:05.60 | |
| 13 | 2 | Nawaf Al-Wazan (KUW) | 4:06.93 | |
| 14 | 2 | Rehan Poncha (IND) | 4:07.72 | |
| 15 | 4 | Timur Irgashev (UZB) | 4:08.86 | |
| 16 | 4 | Ibrahim Nazarov (UZB) | 4:09.40 | |
| 17 | 4 | Chen Te-tung (TPE) | 4:10.42 | |
| 18 | 2 | Chung Kwok Ting (HKG) | 4:13.71 | |
| 19 | 3 | Anas Abu Yousuf (QAT) | 4:15.14 | |
| 20 | 2 | Rashid Iunusov (KGZ) | 4:25.25 | |
| 21 | 1 | Jamil Yamout (LIB) | 4:25.42 | |
| 22 | 4 | Timur Kartabaev (KGZ) | 4:31.23 | |
| 23 | 3 | Soheil Maleka Ashtiani (IRI) | 4:31.66 | |
| 24 | 1 | Ali Adel (IRQ) | 4:38.86 | |
| 25 | 1 | Ali Majeed (IRQ) | 4:51.69 | |
| — | 3 | Sng Ju Wei (SIN) | DNS | |

=== Final ===
| Rank | Athlete | Time | Notes |
|---|---|---|---|
| 1st place, gold medalist(s) | Park Tae-hwan (KOR) | 3:48.44 | GR |
| 2nd place, silver medalist(s) | Zhang Lin (CHN) | 3:49.03 | |
| 3rd place, bronze medalist(s) | Takeshi Matsuda (JPN) | 3:49.38 | |
| 4 | Zhang Enjian (CHN) | 3:53.49 | |
| 5 | Kenichi Doki (JPN) | 3:53.61 | |
| 6 | Kang Yong-hwan (KOR) | 3:53.66 | |
| 7 | Daniel Bego (MAS) | 3:57.34 | |
| 8 | Tharnawat Thanakornworakiart (THA) | 4:03.52 | |
