= 2016 FINA World Swimming Championships (25 m) – Men's 1500 metre freestyle =

Men's 1500 metre freestyle at the 2016 FINA World Swimming Championships (25 m)
- Venue: WFCU Centre
- Dates: 10 December (heats); 11 December (final)
- Competitors: 42 from 34 nations
- Winning time: 14:15.51 CR

Medalists
gold medal	Park Tae-hwan	South Korea
silver medal	Gregorio Paltrinieri	Italy
bronze medal	Wojciech Wojdak	Poland

The Men's 1500 metre freestyle competition of the 2016 FINA World Swimming Championships (25 m) was held on 8 and 9 December 2016.

== Records ==
Prior to the competition, the existing world and championship records were as follows.

	Name	Nation	Time	Location	Date
World record	Gregorio Paltrinieri	Italy	14:08.06	Netanya	4 December 2015
Championship record	Gregorio Paltrinieri	Italy	14:16.10	Doha	7 December 2014

The following records were established during the competition:

Date	Event	Name	Nation	Time	Record
11 December	Final	Park Tae-hwan	South Korea	14:15.51	CR

== Results ==
=== Heats ===
The heats were held at 12:31.

Rank	Heat	Lane	Name	Nationality	Time	Notes
1	5	4	Gregorio Paltrinieri	Italy	14:24.39	Q
2	3	7	Park Tae-hwan	South Korea	14:30.14	Q
3	3	6	Anton Ipsen	Denmark	14:30.92	Q
4	4	5	Wojciech Wojdak	Poland	14:31.06	Q
5	5	5	Henrik Christiansen	Norway	14:33.13	Q
6	4	7	Nicolas Sweetser	United States	14:34.05	Q
7	4	4	Gabriele Detti	Italy	14:34.11	Q
8	5	3	Gergely Gyurta	Hungary	14:38.07	Q
9	4	3	Poul Zellmann	Germany	14:42.28	
10	5	2	Jan Micka	Czech Republic	14:43.30	
11	4	2	Qiu Ziao	China	14:43.43	
12	3	4	Brent Szurdoki	South Africa	14:43.51	
13	5	8	Patrick Ransford	United States	14:47.13	
14	3	5	Michael Mincham	New Zealand	14:47.85	
15	4	0	Shogo Takeda	Japan	14:47.94	
16	4	6	Joris Bouchaut	France	14:49.29	
17	5	6	Florian Wellbrock	Germany	14:52.00	
18	3	9	Felix Auböck	Austria	14:52.90	NR
19	5	9	Victor Johansson	Sweden	14:55.68	
20	5	0	Ayatsugu Hirai	Japan	14:56.55	
21	3	1	Bogdan Scarlat	Romania	15:00.27	
22	2	1	Jarryd Baxter	South Africa	15:00.36	
23	4	8	Martin Bau	Slovenia	15:02.12	
24	4	9	Kristóf Rasovszky	Hungary	15:03.43	
25	2	4	Cho Cheng-Chi	Chinese Taipei	15:04.92	
26	4	1	Lander Hendrickx	Belgium	15:05.10	
27	5	7	Lucas Kanieski	Brazil	15:05.46	
28	3	3	Erik Gidskehaug	Norway	15:07.46	
29	3	0	Peter Brothers	Canada	15:09.34	
30	5	1	Pál Joensen	Faroe Islands	15:13.84	
31	3	8	Oli Mortensen	Faroe Islands	15:24.57	
32	3	2	Pang Sheng Jun	Singapore	15:27.61	
33	2	2	Christian Bayo Punter	Puerto Rico	15:33.52	
34	2	3	Wesley Roberts	Cook Islands	15:36.13	NR
35	2	5	Felipe Tapia Salinas	Chile	15:36.79	NR
36	2	9	Emilio Avila	Guatemala	15:57.90	NR
37	2	7	Russell Brown	Costa Rica	16:10.47	NR
38	2	8	Walter Caballero Quilla	Bolivia	16:10.91	NR
39	1	5	Gabriel Siwady	Honduras	16:32.62	NR
40	2	0	Amir Amrollahi Biuoki	Iran	16:37.69	NR
41	1	4	Frenc Berdaku	Albania	16:37.77	NR
42	1	3	Josue Portillo	Honduras	18:03.62	
	1	6	Oussama Mellouli	Tunisia		DNS
	2	6	Joseph Macías Rubio	Ecuador		DNS

=== Final ===
The final was held at 18:37.

Rank	Lane	Name	Nationality	Time	Notes
1st place, gold medalist(s)	5	Park Tae-hwan	South Korea	14:15.51	CR, AS
2nd place, silver medalist(s)	4	Gregorio Paltrinieri	Italy	14:21.94	
3rd place, bronze medalist(s)	6	Wojciech Wojdak	Poland	14:25.37	
4	3	Anton Ipsen	Denmark	14:31.53	
5	2	Henrik Christiansen	Norway	14:33.56	
6	7	Nicolas Sweetser	United States	14:35.51	
7	8	Gergely Gyurta	Hungary	14:39.01	
8	1	Gabriele Detti	Italy	14:39.34	
