= Swimming at the 2006 Asian Games – Men's 4 × 200 metre freestyle relay =

Men's 4 × 200 metre freestyle relay at the 2006 Asian Games
- Venue: Hamad Aquatic Centre
- Date: 4 December 2006
- Competitors: 61 from 14 nations

Medalists
gold medal	Japan; Takeshi Matsuda, Yuji Sakurai, Takamitsu Kojima, Daisuke Hosokawa
silver medal	China; Yu Chenglong, Zhang Enjian, Chen Zuo, Zhang Lin
bronze medal	South Korea; Lim Nam-gyun, Han Kyu-chul, Kang Yong-hwan, Park Tae-hwan

The men's 4 × 200 m freestyle relay swimming event at the 2006 Asian Games was held on December 4, 2006, at the Hamad Aquatic Centre in Doha, Qatar.

== Schedule ==
All times are Arabia Standard Time (UTC+03:00)

Date	Time	Event
Monday, 4 December 2006	11:15	Heats
Monday, 4 December 2006	19:25	Final

== Records ==
Prior to this competition, the existing world, Asian and Games records were as follows.

World Record	Australia	7:04.66	Fukuoka, Japan	21 July 2001
Asian Record	Japan	7:13.60	Montreal, Canada	29 July 2005
Games Record	Japan	7:20.59	Busan, South Korea	30 September 2002

== Results ==
Legend

- DSQ — Disqualified

=== Heats ===
Rank	Heat	Team	Time	Notes
1	1	China (CHN)	7:24.05	
		Zhang Enjian	1:51.67	
		Chen Zuo	1:50.99	
		Yu Chenglong	1:49.81	
		Wu Peng	1:51.58	
2	2	Japan (JPN)	7:26.01	
		Yuji Sakurai	1:52.09	
		Hiroaki Yamamoto	1:50.32	
		Kenichi Doki	1:52.52	
		Takeshi Matsuda	1:51.08	
3	2	South Korea (KOR)	7:35.62	
		Chung Yong	1:56.17	
		Lim Nam-gyun	1:53.83	
		Kang Yong-hwan	1:52.44	
		Han Kyu-chul	1:53.18	
4	1	Singapore (SIN)	7:42.74	
		Sng Ju Wei	1:56.73	
		Bryan Tay	1:55.47	
		Gary Tan	1:54.93	
		Marcus Cheah	1:55.61	
5	1	Uzbekistan (UZB)	7:44.88	
		Timur Irgashev	1:57.28	
		Ibrahim Nazarov	1:56.23	
		Petr Romashkin	1:55.71	
		Petr Vasiliev	1:55.66	
6	1	Philippines (PHI)	7:44.98	
		Miguel Molina	1:53.21	
		Enchong Dee	1:59.41	
		James Walsh	1:55.62	
		Ryan Arabejo	1:56.74	
7	2	Kuwait (KUW)	7:45.26	
		Waleed Al-Qahtani	1:56.69	
		Mohammad Madwa	1:56.42	
		Nawaf Al-Wazan	1:56.17	
		Marzouq Al-Salem	1:55.98	
8	2	Iran (IRI)	7:45.54	
		Emin Noshadi	1:56.97	
		Mohammad Bidarian	1:56.97	
		Saeid Maleka Ashtiani	1:55.23	
		Soheil Maleka Ashtiani	1:56.37	
9	2	Chinese Taipei (TPE)	7:50.03	
		Tang Sheng-chieh	1:55.64	
		Tsai Kuo-chuan	1:56.07	
		Chen Te-tung	1:56.20	
		Yuan Ping	2:02.12	
10	1	Hong Kong (HKG)	7:51.22	
		Cheung Siu Hang	1:56.22	
		Philip Yee	1:58.83	
		Kevin Chu	1:59.04	
		David Wong	1:57.13	
11	2	Kyrgyzstan (KGZ)	8:04.66	
		Vasilii Danilov	1:56.22	
		Iurii Zakharov	1:59.62	
		Timur Kartabaev	2:06.81	
		Rashid Iunusov	2:02.01	
12	1	India (IND)	8:10.12	
		Virdhawal Khade	1:56.31	
		Rehan Poncha	2:09.72	
		Arjun Muralidharan	2:02.86	
		Ankur Poseria	2:01.23	
13	1	Qatar (QAT)	8:17.27	
		Anas Abu Yousuf	1:58.72	
		Moyssara El-Aarag	2:02.41	
		Osama El-Aarag	2:08.29	
		Ahmed Salamoun	2:07.85	
14	2	Macau (MAC)	8:21.69	
		Victor Wong	1:58.85	
		Lei Chi Lon	2:09.39	
		Lao Kuan Fong	2:04.11	
		Antonio Tong	2:09.34	

=== Final ===
Rank	Team	Time	Notes
1st place, gold medalist(s)	Japan (JPN)	7:14.86	GR
	Takeshi Matsuda	1:47.83	
	Yuji Sakurai	1:48.73	
	Takamitsu Kojima	1:49.94	
	Daisuke Hosokawa	1:48.36	
2nd place, silver medalist(s)	China (CHN)	7:15.13	
	Yu Chenglong	1:50.13	
	Zhang Enjian	1:48.64	
	Chen Zuo	1:49.45	
	Zhang Lin	1:46.91	
3rd place, bronze medalist(s)	South Korea (KOR)	7:23.61	
	Lim Nam-gyun	1:51.51	
	Han Kyu-chul	1:51.46	
	Kang Yong-hwan	1:50.85	
	Park Tae-hwan	1:49.79	
4	Singapore (SIN)	7:39.61	
	Bryan Tay	1:52.15	
	Sng Ju Wei	1:56.69	
	Gary Tan	1:55.29	
	Marcus Cheah	1:55.48	
5	Uzbekistan (UZB)	7:43.07	
	Petr Romashkin	1:56.19	
	Timur Irgashev	1:55.41	
	Danil Bugakov	1:56.26	
	Petr Vasiliev	1:55.21	
6	Philippines (PHI)	7:44.93	
	Miguel Molina	1:53.39	
	Ryan Arabejo	1:57.06	
	Enchong Dee	1:59.27	
	James Walsh	1:55.21	
7	Iran (IRI)	7:50.10	
	Emin Noshadi	1:57.71	
	Mohammad Bidarian	1:57.72	
	Saeid Maleka Ashtiani	1:56.85	
	Soheil Maleka Ashtiani	1:57.82	
—	Kuwait (KUW)	DSQ	
	Waleed Al-Qahtani		
	Mohammad Madwa		
	Nawaf Al-Wazan		
	Marzouq Al-Salem		
