= 2016 FINA World Swimming Championships (25 m) – Men's 4 × 100 metre freestyle relay =

Men's 4 × 100 metre freestyle relay at the 2016 FINA World Swimming Championships (25 m)
- Venue: WFCU Centre
- Dates: 6 December (heats and final)
- Competitors: 68 from 17 nations
- Teams: 17
- Winning time: 3:05.90

Medalists
gold medal	Nikita Lobintsev; Mikhail Vekovishchev; Vladimir Morozov; Aleksandr Popkov; Aleksei Brianskiy	Russia
silver medal	Clément Mignon; Jérémy Stravius; Jordan Pothain; Mehdy Metella; Yonel Govindin	France
bronze medal	Brayden McCarthy; Daniel Smith; David Morgan; Tommaso D'Orsogna	Australia
bronze medal	Michael Chadwick; Tom Shields; Paul Powers; Blake Pieroni; Matthew Josa	United States

The Men's 4 × 100 metre freestyle relay competition of the 2016 FINA World Swimming Championships (25 m) was held on 6 December 2016.

== Records ==
Prior to the competition, the existing world and championship records were as follows.

	Nation	Time	Location	Date
World record	United States	3:03.30	Manchester	19 December 2009
Championship record	France	3:03.78	Doha	3 December 2014

== Results ==
=== Heats ===
The heats were held at 13:37.

Rank	Heat	Lane	Nation	Swimmers	Time	Notes
1	3	6	France	Clément Mignon (46.75); Medhy Metella (46.38); Jérémy Stravius (46.56); Yonel Govindin (48.36)	3:08.05	Q
2	1	8	Russia	Nikita Lobintsev (47.76); Aleksei Brianskiy (47.39); Mikhail Vekovishchev (46.84); Aleksandr Popkov (46.40)	3:08.39	Q
3	1	9	Australia	Breyden McCarthy (47.36); Jack Gerrard (47.61); David Morgan (47.50); Tommaso D'Orsogna (46.50)	3:08.97	Q
4	2	5	United States	Paul Powers (48.24); Matthew Josa (47.78); Michael Chadwick (46.66); Blake Pieroni (46.34)	3:09.02	Q
5	2	0	Canada	Yuri Kisil (47.26); Markus Thormeyer (47.92); Evan van Moerkerke (48.06); Javier Acevedo (47.56)	3:10.80	Q
6	1	0	Japan	Shinri Shioura (47.58); Kenta Ito (47.43); Kosuke Matsui (48.52); Katsuhiro Matsumoto (47.80)	3:11.33	Q
7	2	2	Netherlands	Nyls Korstanje (47.99); Ben Schwietert (47.55); Dion Dreesens (47.72); Kyle Stolk (48.81)	3:12.07	Q
8	1	4	Belarus	Yauhen Tsurkin (48.64); Anton Latkin (47.97); Viktar Staselovich (48.71); Artsiom Machekin (47.57)	3:12.89	Q
9	1	6	China	Li Zhuhao (48.59); Lin Yongqing (47.49); Yu Hexin (48.73); Liu Zhaochen (48.16)	3:12.97	
10	1	5	Finland	Ari-Pekka Liukkonen (48.51); Matias Koski (47.63); Andrei Tuomola (48.39); Riku Poytakivi (48.53)	3:13.06	NR
11	1	7	Sweden	Christoffer Carlsen (48.00); Axel Pettersson (47.98); Daniel Forndal (49.08); Robin Andreasson (48.30)	3:13.36	
12	2	9	Hungary	Ádám Telegdy (48.40); Maksim Lobanovskii (47.17); Richárd Márton (49.20); Márton Barta (50.47)	3:15.24	NR
13	1	1	South Africa	Douglas Erasmus (47.96); Alaric Basson (50.27); Alard Basson (50.65); Eben Vorster (50.26)	3:19.14	
14	2	1	Paraguay	Benjamin Hockin (48.21); Ivo Kunzle Savastano (51.79); Mathias Zacarias (52.35); Charles Hockin (48.10)	3:20.45	
15	1	2	Macau	Man Hou Chao (50.49); Pok Man Ngou (51.62); Cheng Man Yum (53.39); Sizhuang Lin (51.22)	3:26.72	NR
16	2	7	Papua New Guinea	Sam Seghers (50.84); Stanford Kawale (52.78); Livingston Aika (54.08); Ryan Pini (49.06)	3:26.76	NR
17	2	4	Costa Rica	Esteban Araya (53.31); José David Solis Rosales (55.26); Arnoldo Herrera (52.62); Juan Dobles (51.47)	3:32.66	NR
—	1	3	Dominican Republic			DNS
—	2	3	Singapore			DNS
—	2	8	Uzbekistan			DNS

=== Final ===
The final was held at 20:22.

Rank	Lane	Nation	Swimmers	Time	Notes
1st place, gold medalist(s)	5	Russia	Nikita Lobintsev (47.34); Mikhail Vekovishchev (46.96); Vladimir Morozov (45.42); Aleksandr Popkov (46.18)	3:05.90	
2nd place, silver medalist(s)	4	France	Clément Mignon (46.91); Jérémy Stravius (46.21); Jordan Pothain (47.90); Mehdy Metella (46.33)	3:07.35	
3rd place, bronze medalist(s)	3	Australia	Brayden McCarthy (47.57); Daniel Smith (46.84); David Morgan (47.48); Tommaso D'Orsogna (45.87)	3:07.76	
3rd place, bronze medalist(s)	6	United States	Michael Chadwick (47.56); Tom Shields (46.59); Paul Powers (47.59); Blake Pieroni (46.02)	3:07.76	
5	7	Japan	Shinri Shioura (47.48); Kenta Ito (47.10); Kosuke Matsui (47.66); Katsuhiro Matsumoto (47.51)	3:09.75	
6	1	Netherlands	Nyls Korstanje (47.59); Ben Schwietert (47.83); Dion Dreesens (47.40); Kyle Stolk (47.05)	3:09.87	
7	2	Canada	Yuri Kisil (47.03); Markus Thormeyer (47.57); Evan van Moerkerke (48.05); Javier Acevedo (47.31)	3:09.96	
8	8	Belarus	Yauhen Tsurkin (48.43); Anton Latkin (48.07); Viktar Staselovich (48.50); Artsiom Machekin (47.77)	3:12.77	
