= Swimming at the 2017 World Aquatics Championships – Men's 800 metre freestyle =

Men's 800 metre freestyle at the 2017 World Aquatics Championships
- Venue: Danube Arena
- Location: Budapest, Hungary
- Dates: 25 July (heats); 26 July (final)
- Competitors: 30 from 27 nations
- Winning time: 7:40.77

Medalists
gold medal	Gabriele Detti	Italy
silver medal	Wojciech Wojdak	Poland
bronze medal	Gregorio Paltrinieri	Italy

The Men's 800 metre freestyle competition at the 2017 World Championships was held on 25 and 26 July 2017.

== Records ==
Prior to the competition, the existing world and championship records were as follows.

World record	Zhang Lin (CHN)	7:32.12	Rome, Italy	29 July 2009
Competition record	Zhang Lin (CHN)	7:32.12	Rome, Italy	29 July 2009

== Results ==
=== Heats ===
The heats were held on 25 July at 10:31.

Rank	Heat	Lane	Name	Nationality	Time	Notes
1	3	4	Gregorio Paltrinieri	Italy	7:45.31	Q
2	3	3	Wojciech Wojdak	Poland	7:46.39	Q
3	3	5	Henrik Christiansen	Norway	7:47.61	Q
4	3	1	Felix Auböck	Austria	7:49.24	Q, NR
5	4	3	Sun Yang	China	7:49.28	Q
6	4	4	Gabriele Detti	Italy	7:49.67	Q
7	4	1	Florian Wellbrock	Germany	7:50.89	Q
8	4	2	Zane Grothe	United States	7:50.97	Q
9	4	0	Ahmed Akram	Egypt	7:51.41	
10	3	6	Clark Smith	United States	7:51.83	
11	4	8	Victor Johansson	Sweden	7:52.66	NR
12	4	9	Anton Ipsen	Denmark	7:53.37	
13	4	7	Jack McLoughlin	Australia	7:53.51	
14	2	3	Marcelo Acosta	El Salvador	7:55.70	
15	2	1	Ferry Weertman	Netherlands	7:56.44	
16	4	6	Jan Micka	Czech Republic	7:56.71	
17	3	7	Qiu Ziao	China	7:57.47	
18	3	8	Ilya Druzhinin	Russia	8:00.27	
19	3	0	Martin Bau	Slovenia	8:00.32	
20	2	4	Richard Nagy	Slovakia	8:01.42	
21	3	2	Gergely Gyurta	Hungary	8:03.87	
22	2	2	Ricardo Vargas	Mexico	8:04.17	
23	3	9	Antonio Arroyo	Spain	8:04.68	
24	2	6	Dimitrios Negris	Greece	8:05.88	
25	2	8	Guilherme Pina	Portugal	8:08.96	
26	2	5	Martín Naidich	Argentina	8:12.00	
27	2	7	Marc Hinawi	Israel	8:12.39	
28	1	4	Óli Mortensen	Faroe Islands	8:16.25	
29	1	5	Constantinos Hadjittooulis	Cyprus	8:23.30	
30	1	3	Franci Aleksi	Albania	8:37.23	
	4	5	Mack Horton	Australia	DNS	

=== Final ===
The final was held on 26 July at 19:05.

Rank	Lane	Name	Nationality	Time	Notes
1st place, gold medalist(s)	7	Gabriele Detti	Italy	7:40.77	ER
2nd place, silver medalist(s)	5	Wojciech Wojdak	Poland	7:41.73	NR
3rd place, bronze medalist(s)	4	Gregorio Paltrinieri	Italy	7:42.44	
4	3	Henrik Christiansen	Norway	7:44.21	NR
5	2	Sun Yang	China	7:48.87	
6	6	Felix Auböck	Austria	7:51.20	
7	1	Florian Wellbrock	Germany	7:52.27	
8	8	Zane Grothe	United States	7:52.43	
