= Krasnykh =

Krasnykh (Russian: Красных, from красный meaning red) is a gender-neutral Russian surname. It may refer to

- Aleksandr Krasnykh (born 1995), Russian swimmer
