= André Pereira (swimmer) =

Brazilian swimmer (born 1993)

Personal information
- Full name: André Linhares Pereira
- Born: 7 December 1993 (age 32) Osório, Rio Grande do Sul, Brazil
- Height: 185 cm (6 ft 1 in)
- Weight: 84 kg (185 lb)

Sport
- Sport: Swimming
- Club: Grêmio Náutico União

André Linhares Pereira (born 7 December 1993) is a Brazilian swimmer. He competed in the men's 4 × 200 metre freestyle relay event at the 2016 Summer Olympics. At the 2016 Summer Olympics, he competed in the Men's 4 × 200 metre freestyle relay, where the Brazilian relay finished in 15th place.
