= Wojciech Wojdak =

Polish swimmer

Personal information
- Full name: Wojciech Jacek Wojdak
- Nationality: Polish
- Born: 13 March 1996 (age 30) Brzesko, Lesser Poland
- Height: 1.86 m (6 ft 1 in)
- Weight: 84 kg (185 lb)

Sport
- Sport: Swimming
- Strokes: Freestyle
Medal record
Men's swimming
Representing Poland
World Championships (LC)
Silver medal – second place	2017 Budapest	800 m freestyle
World Championships (SC)
Bronze medal – third place	2016 Windsor	1500 m freestyle

Wojciech Wojdak (born 13 March 1996) is a Polish swimmer. He competed in the men's 400 metre freestyle event at the 2016 Summer Olympics. He won silver medal at the 2017 World Aquatics Championships in Budapest in the 800 metre freestyle.
