= Jack Gerrard =

Australian swimmer

Personal information
- Nationality: Australian
- Born: 18 October 1994 (age 31)

Sport
- Sport: Swimming
- Strokes: Freestyle
Medal record
Men's swimming
Representing Australia
World Championships (SC)
Bronze medal – third place	2016 Windsor	4×100 m freestyle
Bronze medal – third place	2016 Windsor	4×200 m freestyle

Jack Gerrard (born 18 October 1994) is an Australian swimmer. He competed in the men's 200 metre freestyle event at the 2018 FINA World Swimming Championships (25 m), in Hangzhou, China.
