= Lim Nam-gyun =

South Korean swimmer (born 1987)

Personal information
- Full name: Lim Nam-gyun
- National team: South Korea
- Born: 4 March 1987 (age 39) Incheon, South Korea
- Height: 1.82 m (6 ft 0 in)
- Weight: 68 kg (150 lb)

Sport
- Sport: Swimming
- Strokes: Freestyle
Medal record
Men's swimming
Representing South Korea
Asian Games
Bronze medal – third place	2006 Doha	4×100 m freestyle
Bronze medal – third place	2006 Doha	4×200 m freestyle

Lim Nam-gyun (also Im Nam-gyun, Korean: 임남균; born March 4, 1987) is a South Korean swimmer, who specialized in sprint freestyle events. He represented his nation South Korea at the 2008 Summer Olympics, and has won two bronze medals, as a member of the men's 400 and 800 m freestyle relay teams at the 2006 Asian Games in Doha, Qatar.

Lim competed for the South Korean swimming team in the men's 100 m freestyle at the 2008 Summer Olympics in Beijing. Leading up to the Games, he finished outside the top-eight final time in 50.82 to set a new national mark and register under the FINA B-cut (50.95) by 0.13 of a second at the 2007 Summer Universiade in Bangkok, Thailand. Coming from sixth at the halfway turn in heat three, Lim edged out the Uzbek swimmer Petr Romashkin by just 0.03 of a second on the final stretch to hit the wall with a fifth-place time in 51.80, almost a second off his entry mark. Lim failed to advance into the semifinals, as he placed fifty-fourth out of 64 swimmers in the prelims.
