= Zhang Enjian =

Chinese swimmer (born 1987)

Personal information
- Born: 12 December 1987 (age 38) Tianjin, China
- Height: 188 cm (6 ft 2 in)
- Weight: 79 kg (174 lb)

Sport
- Sport: Swimming
Medal record
Representing China
Men's swimming
Asian Games
Gold medal – first place	2010 Guangzhou	4×200m freestyle relay
Silver medal – second place	2006 Doha	4×200m freestyle relay
Men's lifesaving
The World Games
Gold medal – first place	2009 Kaohsiung	200m Obstacle Swim

Zhang Enjian (born 12 December 1987 in Tianjin) is a Chinese swimmer, who competed for Team China at the 2008 and 2012 Summer Olympics.

== Major achievements ==
- 2006 Asian Games – 2nd 4 × 200 m freestyle relay;
- 2007 Japan Open – 2nd 200m freestyle;
- 2007 National Intercity Games – 1st 200m freestyle;
- 2008 National Champions Tournament – 1st 100m freestyle
