= Mikhail Dovgalyuk =

Russian swimmer (born 1995)

Personal information
- Full name: Mikhail Dzhavanchirovich Dovgalyuk
- Nationality: Russian
- Born: 3 June 1995 (age 31) Moscow, Russia
- Height: 1.83 m (6 ft 0 in)
- Weight: 82 kg (181 lb)

Sport
- Sport: Swimming
- Strokes: Freestyle
Medal record
Representing (Russia) ROC
Olympic Games
Silver medal – second place	2020 Tokyo	4×200 m freestyle
Representing Russia
World Championships (LC)
Silver medal – second place	2017 Budapest	4×200 m freestyle
Silver medal – second place	2019 Gwangju	4×200 m freestyle
World Championships (SC)
Disqualified	2016 Windsor	4×200 m freestyle
Silver medal – second place	2018 Hangzhou	4×200 m freestyle
European Championships (LC)
Silver medal – second place	2018 Glasgow	4×200 m freestyle
Silver medal – second place	2018 Glasgow	4×200 m mixed freestyle
Bronze medal – third place	2018 Glasgow	200 m freestyle

Mikhail Dzhavanchirovich Dovgalyuk (Russian: Михаил Джаванчирович Довгалюк, IPA: [mʲɪxɐˈil dəvɡɐˈlʲuk]; born 3 June 1995) is a Russian swimmer. He competed in the men's 4 × 200 metre freestyle relay event at the 2016 Summer Olympics.
