= Daniel Smith (swimmer) =

Australian swimmer

Personal information
- Born: 28 May 1991 (age 35) Australia
- Height: 190 cm (6 ft 3 in)
- Weight: 83 kg (183 lb)

Sport
- Sport: Swimming
- Strokes: Freestyle
Medal record
Men's swimming
Representing Australia
World Championships (LC)
Bronze medal – third place	2015 Kazan	4×200 m freestyle
World Championships (SC)
Silver medal – second place	2016 Windsor	4x100 m medley
Bronze medal – third place	2016 Windsor	4x100 m freestyle
Bronze medal – third place	2016 Windsor	4×200 m freestyle

Daniel Smith (born 28 May 1991) is an Australian swimmer. He competed in the men's 4 × 200 metre freestyle relay event at the 2016 Summer Olympics.
