= Ben Schwietert =

Dutch swimmer

Personal information
- National team: Netherlands
- Born: 16 February 1997 (age 29) Nijmegen, Netherlands

Sport
- Sport: Swimming
- Strokes: Freestyle
- Coach: Mark Faber
Medal record
Men's swimming
Representing the Netherlands
World Championships (LC)
Silver medal – second place	2017 Budapest	4x100 m mixed freestyle
European Championships (LC)
Gold medal – first place	2016 London	4×200 m freestyle
Gold medal – first place	2016 London	4×100 m mixed freestyle
European Championships (SC)
Bronze medal – third place	2015 Netanya	4×50 m mixed freestyle

Ben Schwietert (born 16 February 1997) is a Dutch competitive swimmer who specializes in freestyle.

== Career ==
Schwietert participated in his first international championships at the 2015 European Short Course Championships in Netanya, Israel. He was eliminated in the heats of the 50, 100, and 200 meter freestyle. In the 4×50 m mixed freestyle relay, he won the bronze medal together with Jesse Puts, Inge Dekker, and Ranomi Kromowidjojo.

At the 2016 European Aquatics Championships in London, he won the gold medal in the 4 × 100 m mixed freestyle relay together with Sebastiaan Verschuren, Maud van der Meer, and Kromowidjojo. He also won a gold medal in the 4 × 200 meter freestyle relay for swimming in the heats. Individually Schwietert competed in the 100 meter freestyle.

Schwietert qualified for the 2016 Summer Olympics in Rio de Janeiro in the 4 × 200 meter freestyle relay. He swam in the heats and helped the relay team qualify for the final, where it finished 7th.

== Personal life ==
Schwietert was born in the Netherlands, but between ages 1 to 14 he lived abroad with his family. He learned to swim in Moscow, Russia, and started swimming competitively in Shanghai, China. In 2011 he moved back to the Netherlands.
