= Chen Te-tung =

Taiwanese swimmer

Personal information
- Full name: Chen Te-tung
- National team: Chinese Taipei
- Born: 15 October 1985 (age 40)
- Height: 1.84 m (6 ft 1/2 in)
- Weight: 82 kg (181 lb)

Sport
- Sport: Swimming
- Strokes: Freestyle

Chen Te-tung (Chinese: 陳德同; pinyin: Chén Détóng; born October 15, 1985) is a Taiwanese former swimmer, who specialized in freestyle events. Chen qualified for two swimming events, as a member of the Chinese Taipei team, at the 2004 Summer Olympics in Athens. He posted FINA B-standard entry times of 1:53.29 (200 m freestyle) and 4:02.24 (400 m freestyle) from the National University Games in Taipei. On the first day of the Games, Chen placed fortieth in the 400 m freestyle. He pulled off a second-place effort in heat one by a 1.72-second margin behind Philippines' Miguel Mendoza with a time of 4:03.71. The following day, Chen delivered a forty-seventh-place finish in the 200 m freestyle. Swimming in heat three, he raced to a sixth seed by 0.24 of a second behind Cyprus' Alexandros Aresti in 1:54.14.
