= Felipe Tapia =

Chilean swimmer

Personal information
- Born: 25 April 1995 (age 31)

Sport
- Sport: Swimming

Felipe Tapia (born 25 April 1995) is a Chilean swimmer. He competed in the men's 1500 metre freestyle event at the 2016 Summer Olympics.
