= Aleksandr Krasnykh =

Russian swimmer (born 1995)

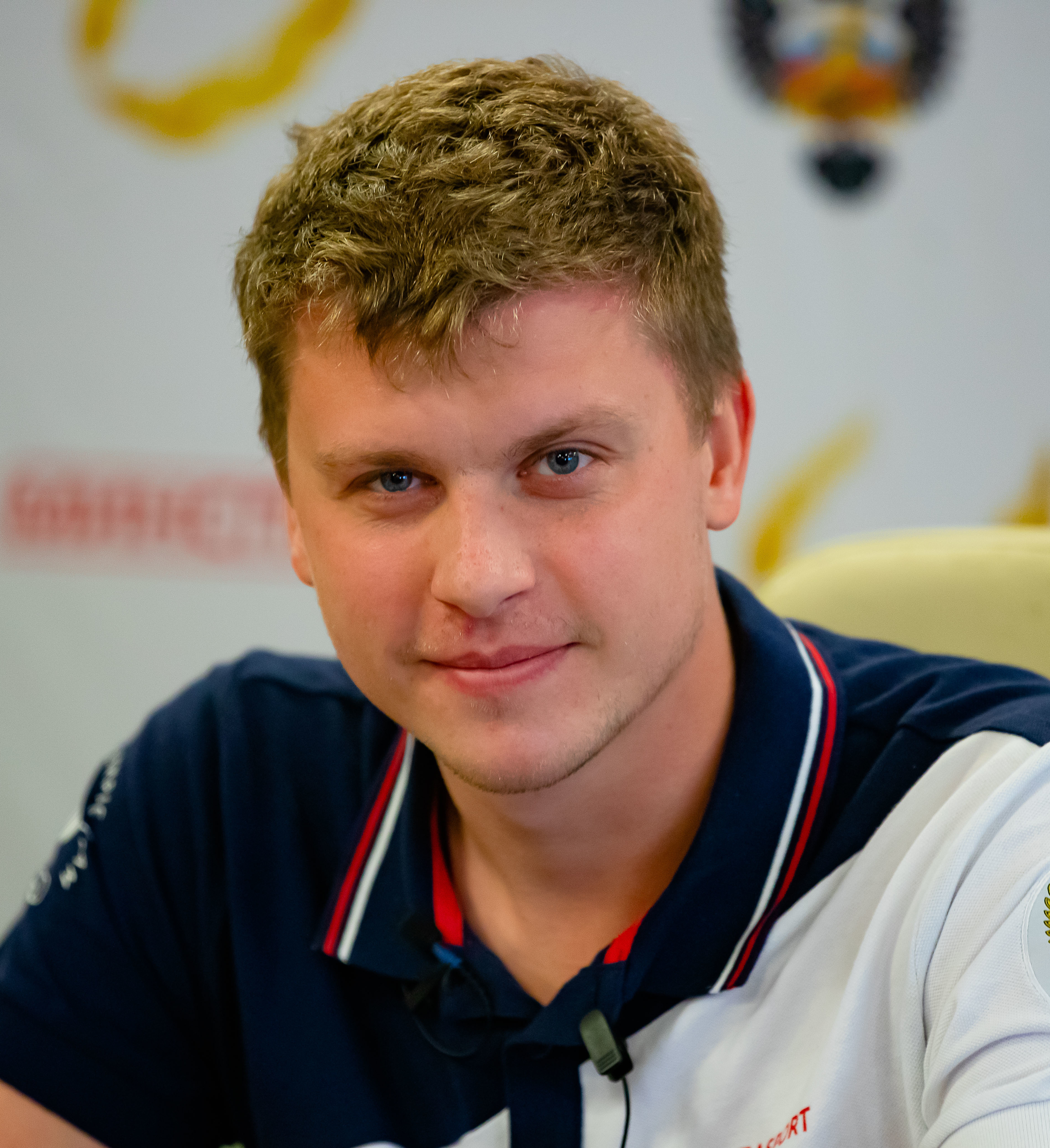
- Krasnykh in 2021

Personal information
- Native name: Александр Владимирович Красных
- Full name: Aleksandr Vladimirovich Krasnykh
- National team: Russia
- Born: 19 June 1995 (age 31) Bugulma, Russia
- Height: 1.88 m (6 ft 2 in)
- Weight: 83 kg (183 lb)

Sport
- Sport: Swimming
- Strokes: Freestyle
Medal record
Men's swimming
Representing (Russia) ROC
Olympic Games
Silver medal – second place	2020 Tokyo	4×200 m freestyle
Representing Russia
World Championships (LC)
Silver medal – second place	2017 Budapest	4×200 m freestyle
Silver medal – second place	2019 Gwangju	4×200 m freestyle
Bronze medal – third place	2017 Budapest	200 m freestyle
World Championships (SC)
Disqualified	2016 Windsor	4×200 m freestyle
Silver medal – second place	2016 Windsor	400 m freestyle
Silver medal – second place	2018 Hangzhou	4×200 m freestyle
Disqualified	2014 Doha	4×200 m freestyle
Bronze medal – third place	2016 Windsor	200 m freestyle
European Championships (LC)
Gold medal – first place	2020 Budapest	4×200 m freestyle
Silver medal – second place	2014 Berlin	4×200 m freestyle
Bronze medal – third place	2020 Budapest	4×200 m mixed freestyle
European Championships (SC)
Gold medal – first place	2017 Copenhagen	400 m freestyle
Silver medal – second place	2017 Copenhagen	200 m freestyle

Aleksandr Vladimirovich Krasnykh (Russian: Александр Владимирович Красных, IPA: [ɐlʲɪˈksandr krɐˈsnɨx]; born 19 June 1995) is a Russian swimmer. He competed in the men's 400 metre freestyle event at the 2016 Summer Olympics.
