= Martin Bau =

Slovenian swimmer (born 1994)

Personal information
- Born: 8 October 1994 (age 31) Maribor, Slovenia

Sport
- Sport: Swimming

Martin Bau (born 8 October 1994) is a Slovenian swimmer. He competed in the men's 1500 metre freestyle event at the 2016 Summer Olympics.
