= Jordan Pothain =

French swimmer

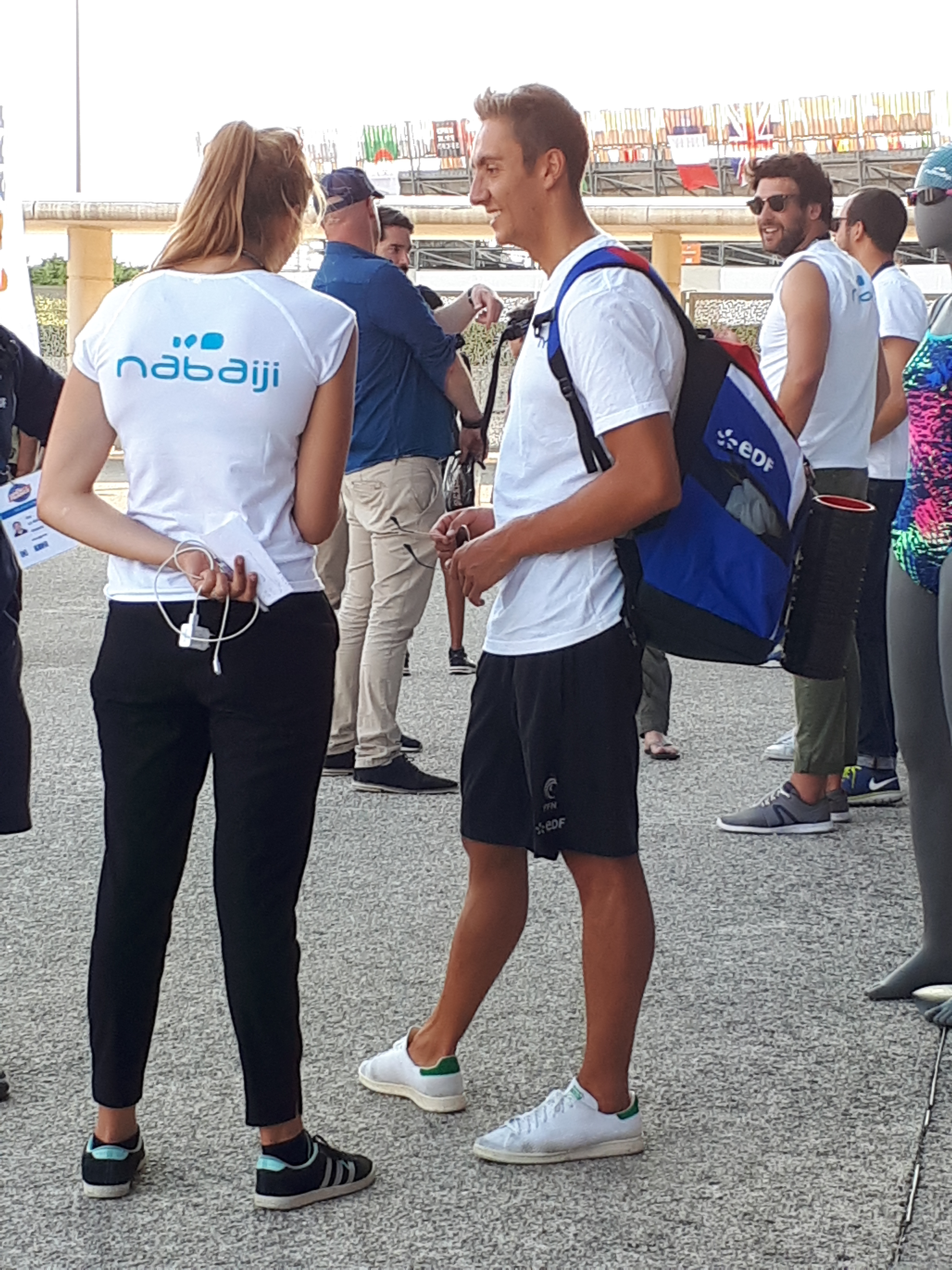
- Pothain at the 2018 Open in France

Personal information
- Nationality: French
- Born: 14 October 1994 (age 32) Échirolles, Isère, France
- Height: 1.87 m (6 ft 2 in)
- Weight: 74 kg (163 lb)

Sport
- Sport: Swimming
Medal record
World Championships (SC)
Silver medal – second place	2016 Windsor	4×100 m freestyle

Jordan Pothain (born 14 October 1994) is a French swimmer.

He competes at the 2016 Summer Olympics in Rio de Janeiro where he qualifies to the final of the 400m freestyle, finishing 8th.
