= South Korea at the 2022 Asian Games =

- IOC code: KOR
- NOC: Korean Olympic Committee

in Hangzhou, China 23 September 2023 – 8 October 2023
- Competitors: 872 (430 men & 440 women) in 39 sports
- Flag bearers: Gu Bon-gil; Kim Seo-yeong (opening)
- Medals Ranked 3rd: Gold 42 Silver 59 Bronze 89 Total 190

Asian Games appearances (overview)
- 1954; 1958; 1962; 1966; 1970; 1974; 1978; 1982; 1986; 1990; 1994; 1998; 2002; 2006; 2010; 2014; 2018; 2022; 2026

South Korea competed at the 2022 Asian Games in Hangzhou, China. Earlier the event was scheduled to held in September 2022 but due to COVID-19 pandemic cases rising in China the event was postponed and rescheduled to September–October 2023.

== Background ==
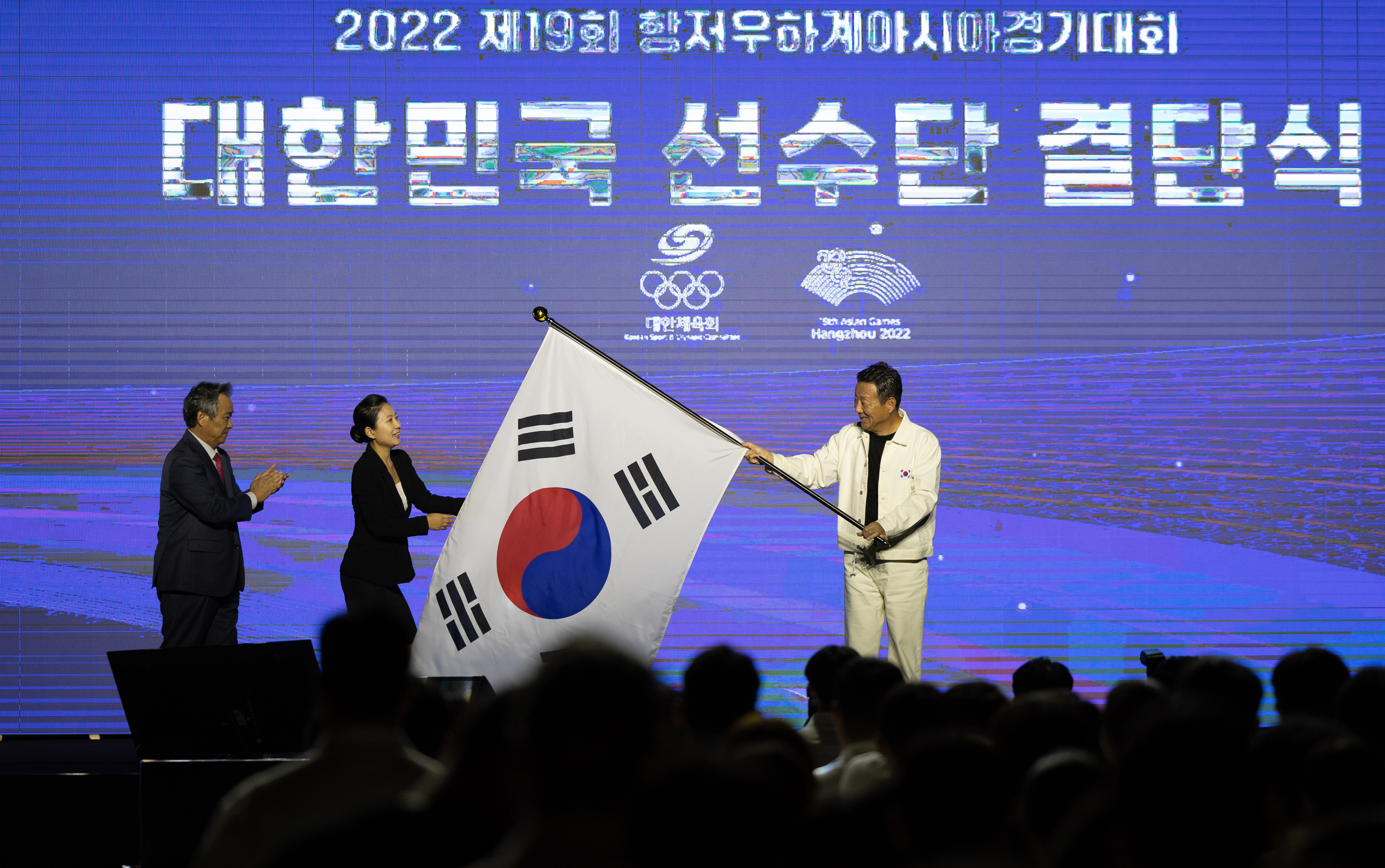
Sending off ceremony of the South Korean delegation to the 2022 Asian Games.

=== Broadcasters ===
Name	Type	Ref.
KBS	Terrestrial	
MBC	Terrestrial	
SBS	Terrestrial	
TV Chosun	Cable	
SPOTV	Pay	
KBS America	Overseas (United States and Canada)	

== Medalists ==
The following South Korea competitors won medals at the Games.

Medal	Name	Sport	Event	Date
Gold	Choi In-jeong	Fencing	Women's individual épée	24 September
Gold	Jun Woong-tae	Modern pentathlon	Men's individual	24 September
Gold	Jun Woong-tae; Lee Ji-hun; Jung Jin-hwa	Modern pentathlon	Men's team	24 September
Gold	Kang Wan-jin	Taekwondo	Men's individual poomsae	24 September
Gold	Cha Yea-eun	Taekwondo	Women's individual poomsae	24 September
Gold	Oh Sang-uk	Fencing	Men's individual sabre	25 September
Gold	Kwak Yong-bin; Jeong You-jin; Ha Kwang-chul	Shooting	Men's 10 metre running target team	25 September
Gold	Ji Yu-chan	Swimming	Men's 50 metre freestyle	25 September
Gold	Yang Jae-hoon; Lee Ho-joon; Kim Woo-min; Hwang Sun-woo; Lee Yoo-yeon; Kim Gun-woo	Swimming	Men's 4 × 200 metre freestyle relay	25 September
Gold	Jang Jun	Taekwondo	Men's 58 kg	25 September
Gold	Yoon Ji-su	Fencing	Women's individual sabre	26 September
Gold	Kim Ha-yun	Judo	Women's +78 kg	26 September
Gold	Cho Won-woo	Sailing	Men's RS:X	26 September
Gold	Jeong You-jin; Ha Kwang-chul; Kwak Yong-bin	Shooting	Men's 10 metre running target mixed team	26 September
Gold	Park Hye-jin	Taekwondo	Women's 53 kg	26 September
Gold	Ha Tae-gyu; Heo Jun; Im Cheol-woo; Lee Kwang-hyun	Fencing	Men's team foil	27 September
Gold	Choi In-jeong; Kang Young-mi; Lee Hye-in; Song Se-ra	Fencing	Women's team épée	27 September
Gold	Hwang Sun-woo	Swimming	Men's 200 metre freestyle	27 September
Gold	Park Woo-hyeok	Taekwondo	Men's 80 kg	25 September
Gold	Gu Bon-gil; Kim Jung-hwan; Kim Jun-ho; Oh Sang-uk	Fencing	Men's team sabre	28 September
Gold	Kim Han-sol	Gymnastics	Men's floor	28 September
Gold	Kim Kwan-woo	Esports	Street Fighter V	28 September
Gold	Kim Woo-min	Swimming	Men's 800 metre freestyle	28 September
Gold	Baek In-chul	Swimming	Men's 50 metre butterfly	28 September
Gold	Seo Jin-hyeok; Park Jae-hyeok; Jung Ji-hun; Lee Sang-hyeok; Ryu Min-seok; Choi Woo-je	Esports	League of Legends	29 September
Gold	Kim Woo-min	Swimming	Men's 400 metre freestyle	29 September
Gold	Jeong Byeong-hee	Roller sports	Men's 10000 metres points elimination	30 September
Gold	Kim Si-woo; Jang Yu-bin; Im Sung-jae; Cho Woo-young	Golf	Men's team	1 October
Gold	An Se-young; Kim Ga-eun; Kim Ga-ram; Baek Ha-na; Lee So-hee; Kim So-yeong; Kong Hee-yong; Jeong Na-eun; Kim Hye-jeong; Chae Yoo-jung	Badminton	Women's team	1 October
Gold	Choi Gwang-ho	Roller sports	Men's 1000 metres sprint	1 October
Gold	Jeon Ji-hee; Shin Yu-bin	Table tennis	Women's doubles	2 October
Gold	Byeon Sang-il; Kim Myung-hun; Park Jeong-hwan; Shin Jin-seo; Shin Min-jun; Lee Ji-hyun	Go	Men's team	3 October
Gold	Oh Jin-hyek; Lee Woo-seok; Kim Je-deok	Archery	Men's team recurve	6 October
Gold	Lim Si-hyeon; An San; Choi Mi-sun	Archery	Women's team recurve	6 October
Gold	Koo Bon-cheol	Ju-jitsu	Men's ne-waza 77 kg	6 October
Gold	Lim Si-hyeon	Archery	Women's individual recurve	7 October
Gold	Lim Si-hyeon; Lee Woo-seok	Archery	Mixed team recurve	7 October
Gold	An Se-young	Badminton	Women's singles	7 October
Gold	Moon Dong-ju; Park Seong-han; Kim Hye-seong; Kim Ju-won; Roh Si-hwan; Kim Seong-yoon; Moon Bo-gyeong; Jang Hyun-seok; Jung Woo-young; Kim Young-kyu; Won Tae-in; Go Woo-suk; Park Se-woong; Kim Dong-heon; Kim Hyung-jun; Choi Won-jun; Choi Ji-min; Na Gyun-an; Gwak Been; Kang Baek-ho; Choi Ji-hoon; Kim Ji-chan; Park Yeong-hyun; Yoon Dong-hee	Baseball	Men	7 October
Gold	Lee Gwang-yeon; Hwang Jae-won; Choi Jun; Park Jin-seop; Lee Jae-ik; Hong Hyun-seok; Jeong Woo-yeong; Paik Seung-ho; Park Jae-yong; Cho Young-wook; Um Won-sang; Min Seong-jun; Goh Young-joon; Lee Han-beom; Jeong Ho-yeon; Kim Tae-hyeon; Song Min-kyu; Lee Kang-in; Seol Young-woo; An Jae-jun; Kim Jeong-hoon; Park Kyu-hyun	Football	Men's tournament	7 October
Gold	Mun Hye-gyeong	Soft tennis	Women's singles	7 October
Gold	Park Hye-jeong	Weightlifting	Women's +87 kg	7 October
Silver	Song Se-ra	Fencing	Women's individual épée	24 September
Silver	Lee Ha-rim	Judo	Men's 60 kg	24 September
Silver	Lee Ji-hun	Modern pentathlon	Men's individual	24 September
Silver	Kim Sun-woo	Modern pentathlon	Women's individual	24 September
Silver	Gu Bon-gil	Fencing	Men's individual sabre	25 September
Silver	Lee Joon-hwan	Judo	Men's 81 kg	25 September
Silver	Song Jong-ho; Lee Gun-hyeok; Kim Seo-jun	Shooting	Men's 25 metre rapid fire pistol team	25 September
Silver	Park Ha-jun	Shooting	Men's 10 metre air rifle	25 September
Silver	Kim Sang-do; Nam Tae-yun; Park Hyeon-jun	Shooting	Men's 10 metre air rifle team	25 September
Silver	Park Woo-hyeok; Seo Geon-woo; Kim Jan-di; Lee Da-bin	Taekwondo	Mixed team	25 September
Silver	Cho Sun-young; Hwang Hyeon-seo; Kim Ha-eun; Lee Hye-jin	Cycling	Women's team sprint	26 September
Silver	Kim Chan-ju; Lee Jin-kyu; Han Kun-kyu; Chang Yong-heung; Kim Nam-uk; Kim Hyun-soo; Jeong Yeon-sik; Park Wan-yong; Lee Geon; Hwang In-jo; Jang Jeong-min; Kim Eui-tae	Rugby sevens	Men	26 September
Silver	Kim Woo-min	Swimming	Men's 1500 metre freestyle	26 September
Silver	Lee Ju-ho; Choi Dong-yeol; Kim Young-beom; Hwang Sun-woo; Cho Sung-jae; Kim Ji-hun; Lee Ho-joon	Swimming	Men's 4 × 100 metre medley relay	26 September
Silver	An Jae-hyun; Jang Woo-jin; Lim Jong-hoon; Oh Jun-sung; Park Gang-hyeon	Table tennis	Men's team	26 September
Silver	Lee Yong-mun	Wushu	Wushu at the 2022 Asian Games – Men's nanquan	26 September
Silver	Lee Tae-hoon	Sailing	Men's iQFoil	27 September
Silver	Ha Jee-min	Sailing	ILKA7	27 September
Silver	Chae Song-oh; Hong Hyo-jin; Hong Se-na; Hong Seo-in	Fencing	Women's team foil	28 September
Silver	Lee Won-ho	Shooting	Men's 10 metre air pistol	28 September
Silver	Ji Yu-chan; Lee Ho-joon; Kim Ji-hun; Hwang Sun-woo; Yang Jae-hoon; Lee Yoo-yeon; Kim Young-beom	Swimming	Men's 4 × 100 metre freestyle relay	28 September
Silver	Kwon Se-hyun	Swimming	Women's 200 metre breaststroke	28 September
Silver	Lee Da-bin	Taekwondo	Women's +67 kg	28 September
Silver	Kang Seo-jun	Cycling	Men's keirin	29 September
Silver	Kim Eu-ro; Shin Dong-in	Cycling	Men's madison	29 September
Silver	IPark Seon-ju; Kim Se-young; Jeon Gyu-mi; Bae Han-oul; Lee Min-ju; Bae Chae-eun; Wi Ji-seon; Choi Ji-na; Kim Ji-eun; Han Ye-ji; Park Sung-gyung; Jo Seo-hyeon	Sepak takraw	Women's team regu	29 September
Silver	Lee Ju-ho	Swimming	Men's 200 metre backstroke	29 September
Silver	Lee Eun-ji; Ho Ka-ru; Kim Seo-yeong; Hur Yeong-kyung; Kim Hye-jin; Park Su-jin; Jeong So-eun	Swimming	Women's 4 × 100 metre medley relay	29 September
Silver	Yi Jae-gyeong; Woo Ha-ram	Diving	Men's synchronized 3 metre springboard	30 September
Silver	Yi Jae-gyeong; Kim Yeong-nam	Diving	Men's synchronized 10 metre platform	1 October
Silver	Im Sung-jae	Golf	Men's individual	1 October
Silver	Yoo Hyun-jo; Lim Ji-yoo; Kim Min-sol	Golf	Women's team	1 October
Silver	Park Sang-cheol; Kwon Soon-bin; Kim Dong-hyeon; Kim Sung-hyun; Choi Young-jae	Esports	PUBG Mobile	1 October
Silver	Jung Cheol-won	Roller sports	Men's 1000 metres sprint	1 October
Silver	Jang Woo-jin; Lim Jong-hoon	Table tennis	Men's doubles	1 October
Silver	Cho Gwang-hee; Jang Sang-won	Canoeing	Men's K-2 500 metres	2 October
Silver	Kim Min-gyu	Kurash	Men's 90 kg	2 October
Silver	Choi In-ho, Choi; Gwang-ho; Jung Cheol-won	Roller sports	Men's 3000 metres relay	2 October
Silver	Lee Seul; Park Min-jeong; Lee Ye-rim	Roller sports	Women's 3000 metres relay	2 October
Silver	Cho Gwang-hee; Jo Hyun-hee; Jang Sang-won; Jeong Ju-hwan	Canoeing	Men's K-4 500 metres	3 October
Silver	Choi Ran; Lee Han-sol; Jo Shin-young; Lee Ha-lin	Canoeing	Women's K-4 500 metres	3 October
Silver	Kim Eun-ji; Oh Yu-jin; Choi Jeong; Kim Chae-young	Go	Women's team	3 October
Silver	So Chae-won; Joo Jae-hoon	Archery	Mixed team compound	4 October
Silver	Woo Sang-hyeok	Athletics	Men's high jump	4 October
Silver	Na Ah-reum	Cycling	Women's road race	4 October
Silver	Joo Jae-hoon; Yang Jae-won; Kim Jong-ho	Archery	Men's team compound	5 October
Silver	Kim Seon-hwa; Song Ji-young; Shin Eun-joo; Kim Min-seo; Ryu Eun-hee; Jeong Jin-hui; Park Sae-young; Jo Su-yeon; Kang Eun-hye; Song Hye-soo; Lee Mi-gyeong; Kang Kyung-min; Kang Eun-seo; Yun Ye-jin; Gim Boe-un; Park Joe-un	Handball	Women	5 October
Silver	Lee Do-hyun	Sport climbing	Men's combined	6 October
Silver	Yun Ha-je	Weightlifting	Women's 87 kg	6 October
Silver	An San	Archery	Women's individual recurve	7 October
Silver	So Chae-won	Archery	Women's individual compound	7 October
Silver	Choi Sol-gyu; Kim Won-ho	Badminton	Men's doubles	7 October
Silver	Baek Ha-na; Lee So-hee	Badminton	Women's doubles	7 October
Silver	Kim Hong-yul	Breaking	B-Boys	7 October
Silver	Seo Jung-eun; An Hyo-ju; Kang Ji-na; Cheon Eun-bi; Cho Hye-jin; Kim Min-jeong; Cho Eun-ji; Lee Yu-ri; Choi Su-ji; Kim Jeong-ihn; Seo Su-young; Park Seung-ae; Baek Ee-seul; Kim Eun-ji; An Su-jin; Pak Ho-jeong; Lee Jin-min; Kim Eun-ji	Field hockey	Women's tournament	7 October
Silver	Kim Hee-seoung	Ju-jitsu	Men's ne-waza 85 kg	7 October
Silver	Sung Ki-ra	Ju-jitsu	Women's ne-waza 63 kg	7 October
Silver	Seo Chae-hyun	Sport climbing	Women's combined	7 October
Silver	Son Young-hee	Weightlifting	Women's +87 kg	6 October
Bronze	An Ba-ul	Judo	Men's 66 kg	24 September
Bronze	Jung Ye-rin	Judo	Women's 52 kg	24 September
Bronze	Kim Sun-woo; Kim Se-hee; Seong Seung-min	Modern pentathlon	Women's team	24 September
Bronze	Hwang Sun-woo	Swimming	Men's 100 metre freestyle	24 September
Bronze	Lee Ju-ho	Swimming	Men's 100 metre backstroke	24 September
Bronze	Hong Se-na	Fencing	Women's individual foil	25 September
Bronze	Park Eun-song	Judo	Women's 57 kg	25 September
Bronze	Kim Ji-jeong	Judo	Women's 63 kg	25 September
Bronze	Kim Ha-yeong; Lee Soo-bin	Rowing	Women's coxless pair	25 September
Bronze	Jeong You-jin	Shooting	Men's 10 metre running target	25 September
Bronze	Choi Dong-yeol	Swimming	Men's 100 metre breaststroke	25 September
Bronze	Kim Seo-yeong	Swimming	Women's 200 metre individual medley	25 September
Bronze	Kim Min-jong	Judo	Men's +100 kg	26 September
Bronze	Yoon Hyun-ji	Judo	Women's 78 kg	26 September
Bronze	Kim Jia; Cho Sung-min	Sailing	470	26 September
Bronze	Jeong You-jin	Shooting	Men's 10 metre running target mixed	26 September
Bronze	Lee Eun-seo; Park Ha-jun	Shooting	Mixed 10 metre air rifle team	26 September
Bronze	Lee Eun-ji	Swimming	Women's 20 metre backstroke	26 September
Bronze	Jeon Ji-hee; Lee Eun-hye; Shin Yu-bin; Suh Hyo-won; Yang Ha-eun	Table tennis	Women's team	26 September
Bronze	Kim Yu-jin	Taekwondo	Women's 57 kg	26 September
Bronze	Jang Hun; Kim Hyeon-seok; Min Kyeong-ho; Shin Dong-in	Cycling	Men's team pursuit	27 September
Bronze	Kwak Jun-hyouk	Esports	EA Sports FC Online	27 September
Bronze	Lee Young-eun	Sailing	Women's Kite	27 September
Bronze	Yang Ji-in	Shooting	Women's 25 metre pistol	27 September
Bronze	Yang Ji-in; Sim Eun-ji; Kim Lan-a	Shooting	Women's 25 metre pistol team	27 September
Bronze	Lee Kye-rim; Bae Sang-hee; Lee Eun-seo	Shooting	Women's 50 metre rifle three positions team	27 September
Bronze	Lee Ho-joon	Swimming	Men's 200 metre freestyle	27 September
Bronze	Lee Eun-ji	Swimming	Women's 100 metre backstroke	27 September
Bronze	Lee Eun-ji; Choi Dong-yeol; Kim Seo-yong; Hwang Sun-woo; Lee Ju-ho; Hur Yeon-kyung	Swimming	Mixed 4 × 100 metre medley relay	27 September
Bronze	Jin Ho-jun	Taekwondo	Men's 68 kg	27 September
Bronze	Lee Ju-mi; Na Ah-reum	Cycling	Women's madison	28 September
Bronze	Shin Jin-seo	Go	Men's individual	28 September
Bronze	Kim Seo-yeong; Hur Yeon-kyung; Park Su-jin; Han Da-kyung; Lee Eun-ji; Jeong So-eun	Swimming	Women's 4 × 200 metre freestyle relay	28 September
Bronze	Kim Min-soo	Wushu	Men's sanda 60 kg	28 September
Bronze	Jeon Seong-jin	Wushu	Men's sanda 65 kg	28 September
Bronze	Lee Jeong-tae; Kim Kuk-young; Lee Jae-seong; Ko Seung-hwan	Athletics	Women's hammer throw	29 September
Bronze	Kweon Young-jun; Kim Jae-won; Son Tae-jin; Ma Se-geon	Fencing	Men's team épée	29 September
Bronze	Hong Hae-un; Choi Se-bin; Yoon Ji-su; Jeon Eun-hye	Fencing	Women's team sabre	29 September
Bronze	Lim Su-min	Gymnastics	Women's floor	29 September
Bronze	Im An-soo; Seonwoo Young-su; Jeong Ha-sung; Lee Min-ju; Kim Jung-man; Kim Young-cheol; Lee Woo-jin; Lim Tae-gyun; Lee Jae-seong; Seo Seung-beom; Lee Jun-uk; Kim Hyun-soo	Sepak takraw	Men's team regu	29 September
Bronze	Mo Dai-seong; Kim Sang-do; Kim Jong-hyun	Shooting	Men's 50 metre three positions team	29 September
Bronze	Choi Dong-yeol	Swimming	Men's 50 metre breaststroke	29 September
Bronze	Hong Seong-chan; Kwon Soon-woo	Tennis	Men's doubles	29 September
Bronze	Kwon Jae-deog	Kurash	Men's 66 kg	30 September
Bronze	Jeong Jun-yong	Kurash	Men's +90 kg	30 September
Bronze	Choi In-ho	Roller sports	Men's 10000 metres points elimination	30 September
Bronze	Yu Ga-ram	Roller sports	Women's 10000 metres points elimination	30 September
Bronze	Lee Won-ho; Kim Bo-mi	Shooting	Mixed 10 metre air pistol team	30 September
Bronze	Heo Ming-yeong; Lee Ji-hyun; Yang Yeon-soo	Squash	Women's team	30 September
Bronze	Lim Jong-hoon; Shin Yu-bin	Table tennis	Mixed doubles	30 September
Bronze	Jang Woo-jin; Jeon Ji-hee	Table tennis	Mixed doubles	30 September
Bronze	Hong Seong-chan	Tennis	Men's singles	30 September
Bronze	Back Da-yeon; Jeong Bo-young	Tennis	Women's doubles	30 September
Bronze	Seo Seung-jae; Lee Yun-gyu; Kim Won-ho; Kim Young-hyuk; Kang Min-hyuk; Jeon Hyeok-jin; Jin Yong; Cho Geon-yeop; Choi Sol-gyu; Na Sung-seung	Badminton	Men's team	1 October
Bronze	Park Ha-reum; Kim Su-ji	Diving	Women's synchronized 3 metre springboard	1 October
Bronze	Yoo Hyun-jo	Golf	Women's individual	1 October
Bronze	Lee Ye-rim	Roller sports	Women's 1000 metres sprint	1 October
Bronze	Shin Yu-bin	Table tennis	Women's singles	1 October
Bronze	Lee Sang-yeon	Weightlifting	Men's 67 kg	1 October
Bronze	Woo Ha-ram	Diving	Men's 1 metre springboard	2 October
Bronze	Kim Su-ji	Diving	Women's 1 metre springboard	2 October
Bronze	Jang Woo-jin	Table tennis	Men's singles	2 October
Bronze	Kim Tae-hui	Athletics	Men's 4 × 100 metres relay	3 October
Bronze	Jeong Jae-min	Boxing	Men's 92 kg	3 October
Bronze	Yi Jae-gyeong	Diving	Men's 3 metre springboard	3 October
Bronze	Jung Yong-jun; Lee Seung-beom; Lee Yong-su	Sport climbing	Men's speed relay	4 October
Bronze	Choi Na-woo; Jeong Ji-min; Noh Hee-ju	Sport climbing	Women's speed relay	4 October
Bronze	Kim Byung-gook; Kim Hyun-soo; Kim Tae-min; Lee Hyeon-su; Yoon Hyoung-wook	Soft tennis	Men's team	4 October
Bronze	Ji Da-young; Ko Eun-ji; Lee Min-seon; Lim Jin-ah; Mun Hye-gyeong	Soft tennis	Women's team	4 October
Bronze	Chung Han-jae	Wrestling	Men's Greco-Roman 60 kg	4 October
Bronze	So Chae-won; Oh Yoohyun; Cho Sua	Archery	Women's team compound	5 October
Bronze	Shin Ji-hyun; Kang Lee-seul; An He-ji; Lee So-hee; Park Ji-su; Lee Kyung-eun; Kang Yoo-lim; Park Ji-hyun; Lee Hae-ran; Kim Dan-bi; Yang In-young; Jin An	Basketball	Women	5 October
Bronze	Joo Seong-hyeon	Ju-jitsu	Men's ne-waza 69 kg	5 October
Bronze	Park Hee-jun	Karate	Men's kata	5 October
Bronze	Kim Hyun-soo; Mun Hye-gyeong	Soft tennis	Mixed doubles	5 October
Bronze	Kim Su-hyeon	Weightlifting	Women's 76 kg	5 October
Bronze	Kim Min-seok	Wrestling	Men's Greco-Roman 130 kg	5 October
Bronze	Byun Eun-jeong; Cha Tae-hee; Cho Soo-bin; Han Sol-hee; Jeong Ji-won; Ju Hee; Ju Yun-woo; Kim Da-bin; Kim Hyeon-hee; Kim Yeo-jin; Lee Hyeon-joo; Lim Sung-hwa; Tak Su-jin; Yun Ye-bom	Dragon boat	Women's 1000 metres	6 October
Bronze	Hwang Tae-il; Jang Jong-hyun; Jeong Jun-woo; Ji Woo-cheon; Jung Man-jae; Kang Young-bin; Kim Hyeong-jin; Kim Jae-hyeon; Kim Jung-hoo; Kim Sung-hyun; Lee Hye-seung; Lee Jung-jun; Lee Ju-young; Lee Nam-yong; Lee Seung-hoon; Park Cheo-leon; Son Da-in; Yang Ji-hun	Field hockey	Men's tournament	6 October
Bronze	Park Jeong-hye	Ju-jitsu	Women's ne-waza 52 kg	6 October
Bronze	Jung A-ram	Weightlifting	Women's 87 kg	6 October
Bronze	Lee Woo-seok	Archery	Men's individual recurve	7 October
Bronze	Yang Jae-won	Archery	Men's individual compound	7 October
Bronze	Kim So-yeong; Kong Hee-yong	Badminton	Women's doubles	7 October
Bronze	Seo Seung-jae; Chae Yoo-jung	Badminton	Mixed doubles	7 October
Bronze	Choi Hee-joo	Ju-jitsu	Women's ne-waza 63 kg	7 October
Bronze	Jeon Gyu-mi; Bae Han-oul; Wi Ji-seon; Park Seon-ju; Lee Jin-hee	Sepak takraw	Women's regu	7 October
Bronze	Park Jae-hun	Marathon swimming	Men's marathon 10 kilometre	7 October
Bronze	Yoon Hyoung-wook	Soft tennis	Men's singles	7 October

== Medals by sport ==
Medals by sport
Sport	Gold	Silver	Bronze	Total
Archery	4	4	3	11
Athletics	0	1	2	3
Badminton	2	2	3	7
Baseball	1	0	0	1
Basketball	0	0	1	1
Boxing	0	0	1	1
Breakdancing	0	1	0	1
Canoeing	0	3	0	3
Cycling Track	0	3	2	5
Cycling Road	0	1	0	1
Diving	0	2	4	6
Dragon boat	0	0	1	1
Fencing	6	3	3	12
Field hockey	0	1	1	2
Football	1	0	0	1
Golf	1	2	1	4
Gymnastics	1	0	1	2
Handball	0	1	0	1
Judo	1	2	6	9
Ju-jitsu	1	2	3	6
Karate	0	0	1	1
Kurash	0	1	2	3
Mind sports Esports	2	1	1	4
Mind sports Go	1	1	1	3
Modern pentathlon	2	2	1	5
Roller sports Skateboarding	2	3	3	8
Rugby sevens	0	1	0	1
Rowing	0	0	1	1
Sailing	1	2	2	5
Sepak takraw	0	1	2	3
Shooting	2	4	8	14
Sport climbing	0	2	2	4
Squash	0	0	1	1
Swimming	6	6	10	22
Swimming Marathon	0	0	1	1
Table tennis	1	2	5	8
Tennis	0	0	3	3
Soft Tennis	1	0	4	5
Taekwondo	5	2	2	9
Weightlifting	1	2	3	6
Wrestling	0	0	2	2
Wushu	0	1	2	3
Total	42	59	89	190

=== Medals by gender ===
Medals by gender
Gender	Gold	Silver	Bronze	Total
Male	26	34	40	100
Female	13	22	40	75
Mixed/Open	3	3	9	14
Total	42	59	89	190

== Archery ==
Recurve

Athlete	Event	Ranking round		Round of 64	Round of 32	Round of 16	Quarterfinals	Semifinals	Final / GM / BM	
Athlete	Event	Score	Seed	Opposition Score	Opposition Score	Opposition Score	Opposition Score	Opposition Score	Opposition Score	Rank
Lee Woo-seok	Men's individual	690	1 A	Bye	Pathairat (THA); W 6–2	Baasith (INA); W 7–1	Sadikov (UZB); W 6–2	Qi Xiangshuo (CHN); L 5–6	Ilfat Abdullin (KAZ); W 7–1	3rd place, bronze medalist(s)
Oh Jin-hyek	Men's individual	681	3 A	Bye	Tilak Pun Magar (NEP); W 6–0	Ilfat Abdullin (KAZ); L 5–6	Did not advanced			
Kim Woo-jin	Men's individual	675	8	Did not advance						
Kim Je-deok	Men's individual	677	6	Did not advance						

Compound

Athlete	Event	Ranking round		Round of 32	Round of 16	Quarterfinals	Semifinals	Final / BM	
Athlete	Event	Score	Seed	Opposition Score	Opposition Score	Opposition Score	Opposition Score	Opposition Score	Rank
Joo Jae-hun; Yang jae-won Kim Jong-ho	Men's team	2117 GR	1 Q	—N/a	Bye	Thailand (THA); W 228–222	Malaysia (MAS); W 232–230	India (IND); L 230–235	2nd place, silver medalist(s)
So Chae-won; Oh Yoo-hyun; Cho Su-a	Women's team	2087 GR	2 Q	—N/a	Bye	Vietnam (VIE); W 236–211	Chinese Taipei (TPE); L 224–230	Indonesia (INA); W 232–229	3rd place, bronze medalist(s)
Joo Jae-hun	Men's individual	712	1 Q	—N/a	Alshalahi (KUW); W 147–146	Mohd Juwaidi Mazuki (MAS); W 148–135	Abhishek Verma (IND); L 145–147	Yang Jae-won (KOR); L 146–147	4

== Baseball ==
Team	Event	Preliminary round				Super round			Final	
Team	Event	Opposition Score	Opposition Score	Opposition Score	Rank	Opposition Score	Opposition Score	Rank	Opposition Score	Rank
South Korea men's	Men's tournament	Hong Kong; W 10–0	Chinese Taipei; L 0–4	Thailand; W 17–0	2 Q	Japan; W 2–0	China; W 8–1	2 Q	Chinese Taipei; W 2–0	1st place, gold medalist(s)

== Canoeing ==
=== Slalom ===
Athlete	Event	Heats		Semifinal		Final	
Athlete	Event	Best	Rank	Time	Rank	Time	Rank
Baik Seung-cheol	Men's C-1	274.47	12	Did not advance			
Baek Jeong-hyeon	Men's C-1	285.10	13	Did not advance			

=== Sprint ===
Athlete	Event	Heats		Final	
Athlete	Event	Time	Rank	Time	Rank
Kim Yi-yeol	Men's C-1 1000 m	4:42.382	3 QF	5:12.471	9
Hwang Seon-hong; Kim Yi-yeol	Men's C-2 500 m	1:53.470	3 QF	1:53.412	5

== Football ==
Both of South Korea men's team and women's team were drawn in Group E at the Games.

Team	Event	Group Stage				Round of 16	Quarterfinals	Semifinals	Final / BM	
Team	Event	Opposition Score	Opposition Score	Opposition Score	Rank	Opposition Score	Opposition Score	Opposition Score	Opposition Score	Rank
South Korea men's	Men's tournament	Kuwait; W 9–0	Thailand; W 4–0	Bahrain; W 3–0	1 Q	Kyrgyzstan; W 5–1	China; W 2–0	Uzbekistan; W 2–1	Japan; W 2–1	1st place, gold medalist(s)
South Korea women's	Women's tournament	Myanmar; W 3–0	Philippines; W 5–1	Hong Kong; W 5–0	1 Q	—N/a	North Korea; L 1–4	Did not advance		5

=== Men's tournament ===
Roster

The following 22 players list is the South Korea squad for the 2022 Asian Games.

Head Coach: (South Korea) Hwang Sun-hong

No.	Pos.	Player	Date of birth (age)	Club
1	GK	Lee Gwang-yeon	11 September 1999 (aged 24)	(Korea Football Association) Gangwon FC
2	DF	Hwang Jae-won	16 August 2002 (aged 21)	(Korea Football Association) Daegu FC
3	DF	Choi Jun	17 April 1999 (aged 24)	(Korea Football Association) Busan IPark
4	DF	Park Jin-seob*	23 October 1995 (aged 27)	(Korea Football Association) Jeonbuk Hyundai Motors
5	DF	Lee Jae-ik	21 May 1999 (aged 24)	(Korea Football Association) Seoul E-Land
6	MF	Hong Hyun-seok	16 June 1999 (aged 24)	(Royal Belgian Football Association) Gent
7	MF	Jeong Woo-yeong	20 September 1999 (aged 23)	(German Football Association) VfB Stuttgart
8	MF	Paik Seung-ho*	17 March 1997 (aged 26)	(Korea Football Association) Jeonbuk Hyundai Motors
9	FW	Park Jae-yong	13 March 2000 (aged 23)	(Korea Football Association) Jeonbuk Hyundai Motors
10	MF	Cho Young-wook	5 February 1999 (aged 24)	(Korea Football Association) Gimcheon Sangmu
11	MF	Um Won-sang	6 January 1999 (aged 24)	(Korea Football Association) Ulsan Hyundai
12	GK	Min Seong-jun	22 July 1999 (aged 24)	(Korea Football Association) Incheon United
13	MF	Goh Young-jun	9 July 2001 (aged 22)	(Korea Football Association) Pohang Steelers
14	DF	Lee Han-beom	17 June 2002 (aged 21)	(Danish Football Association) Midtjylland
15	MF	Jeong Ho-yeon	28 September 2000 (aged 22)	(Korea Football Association) Gwangju FC
16	DF	Kim Tae-hyeon	17 September 2000 (aged 23)	(Japan Football Association) Vegalta Sendai
17	MF	Song Min-kyu	12 September 1999 (aged 24)	(Korea Football Association) Jeonbuk Hyundai Motors
18	MF	Lee Kang-in	19 February 2001 (aged 22)	(French Football Federation) Paris Saint-Germain
19	DF	Seol Young-woo*	5 December 1998 (aged 24)	(Korea Football Association) Ulsan Hyundai
20	FW	An Jae-jun	3 April 2001 (aged 22)	(Korea Football Association) Bucheon FC 1995
21	GK	Kim Jeong-hoon	20 April 2001 (aged 22)	(Korea Football Association) Jeonbuk Hyundai Motors
22	DF	Park Kyu-hyun	14 April 2001 (aged 22)	(German Football Association) Dynamo Dresden

* Over-aged player.

Group E

Pos	Team	Pld	W	D	L	GF	GA	GD	Pts	Qualification
1	South Korea	3	3	0	0	16	0	+16	9	Knockout stage
2	Bahrain	3	0	2	1	2	5	−3	2	Knockout stage
3	Thailand	3	0	2	1	2	6	−4	2	Knockout stage
4	Kuwait	3	0	2	1	2	11	−9	2	

Source: Football – Men – Groups
Rules for classification: Group stage tiebreakers
19 September 2023
19:30

South Korea	9–0	Kuwait
Jeong Woo-yeong 3', 45', 48'; Cho Young-wook 19', 74'; Paik Seung-ho 44'; Um Won-sang 52'; Park Jae-yong 80'; An Jae-jun 90+6'	Report

Jinhua Stadium, Jinhua
Attendance: 2,936
Referee: Hasan Akrami (Iran)

21 September 2023
19:30

Thailand	0–4	South Korea
	Report	Hong Hyun-seok 15'; An Jae-jun 20'; Um Won-sang 39'; Lee Jae-ik 45+1'

Jinhua Stadium, Jinhua
Attendance: 3,166
Referee: Ahmad Yacoub Ibrahim (Jordan)

24 September 2023
19:30

South Korea	3–0	Bahrain
Lee Han-beom 61'; Paik Seung-ho 74'; Goh Young-jun 84'	Report

Jinhua Stadium, Jinhua
Attendance: 19,084
Referee: Yousif Saeed Hasan (Iraq)

Round of 16

27 September 2023
19:30 UTC+8

South Korea	5–1	Kyrgyzstan
Paik Seung-ho 11' (pen.); Jeong Woo-yeong 12', 74' (pen.); Cho Young-wook 79'; Hong Hyun-seok 85'	Report	Alygulov 28'

Jinhua Stadium, Jinhua
Attendance: 18,393
Referee: Alex King (Australia)

Quarterfinal

1 October 2023
20:00 UTC+8

China	0–2	South Korea
	Report	Hong Hyun-seok 18'; Song Min-kyu 35'

Huanglong Sports Centre Stadium, Hangzhou
Attendance: 38,158
Referee: Qasim Al-Hatmi (Oman)

Semifinal

4 October 2023
20:00 UTC+8

South Korea	2–1	Uzbekistan
Jeong Woo-yeong 3', 38'	Report	Jaloliddinov 25'

Huanglong Sports Centre Stadium, Hangzhou
Attendance: 38,019
Referee: Ammar Ashkanani (Kuwait)

Final

7 October 2023
20:00 UTC+8

(gold) South Korea	2–1	Japan (silver)
Jeong Woo-yeong 27'; Cho Young-wook 56'	Report	Uchino 2'

Huanglong Sports Centre Stadium, Hangzhou
Attendance: 38,018
Referee: Ammar Mahfoodh (Bahrain)

=== Women's tournament ===
Roster

The following 22 players were called up for the 2022 Asian Games.

Head Coach: (England) Colin Bell

No.	Pos.	Player	Date of birth (age)	Caps	Goals	Club
1	GK	Choi Ye-seul (최예슬)	12 March 1997 (aged 26)	1	0	(Korea Football Association) Changnyeong WFC
18	GK	Kim Jung-mi (김정미)	16 October 1984 (aged 38)	138	0	(Korea Football Association) Incheon Hyundai SRA
21	GK	Ryu Ji-soo (류지수)	3 September 1997 (aged 26)	0	0	(Korea Football Association) Seoul WFC
2	DF	Choo Hyo-joo (추효주)	29 July 2000 (aged 23)	34	3	(Korea Football Association) Suwon UDC
3	DF	Kim Hye-yeong (김혜영)	26 February 1995 (aged 28)	10	1	(Korea Football Association) Gyeongju KHNP WFC
4	DF	Shim Seo-yeon (심서연)	15 April 1989 (aged 34)	80	0	(Korea Football Association) Suwon UDC
6	DF	Lim Seon-joo (임선주)	27 November 1990 (aged 32)	105	6	(Korea Football Association) Incheon Hyundai SRA
16	DF	Jang Sel-gi (장슬기)	31 May 1994 (aged 29)	93	13	(Korea Football Association) Incheon Hyundai SRA
20	DF	Kim Hye-ri (김혜리) (captain)	25 June 1990 (aged 33)	115	1	(Korea Football Association) Incheon Hyundai SRA
5	MF	Kwon Hah-nul (권하늘)	7 March 1988 (aged 35)	105	15	(Korea Football Association) Mungyeong Sangmu
8	MF	Lee Min-a (이민아)	8 November 1991 (aged 31)	76	17	(Korea Football Association) Incheon Hyundai SRA
10	MF	Ji So-yun (지소연)	21 February 1991 (aged 32)	148	67	(Korea Football Association) Suwon UDC
14	MF	Jeon Eun-ha (전은하)	28 January 1993 (aged 30)	14	0	(Korea Football Association) Suwon UDC
15	MF	Chun Ga-ram (천가람)	19 October 2002 (aged 20)	6	0	(Korea Football Association) Hwacheon KSPO
22	MF	Bae Ye-bin (배예빈)	7 December 2004 (aged 18)	2	0	(Korea Football Association) Uiduk University
7	FW	Son Hwa-yeon (손화연)	15 March 1997 (aged 26)	51	8	(Korea Football Association) Incheon Hyundai SRA
9	FW	Mun Eun-ju (문은주)	1 September 2000 (aged 23)	5	1	(Korea Football Association) Hwacheon KSPO
11	FW	Choe Yu-ri (최유리)	16 September 1994 (aged 29)	54	9	(The Football Association) Birmingham City
12	FW	Moon Mi-ra (문미라)	28 February 1992 (aged 31)	32	16	(Korea Football Association) Suwon UDC
13	FW	Park Eun-sun (박은선)	25 December 1986 (aged 36)	45	20	(Korea Football Association) Seoul WFC
17	FW	Jung Seol-bin (정설빈)	6 January 1990 (aged 33)	82	22	(Korea Football Association) Incheon Hyundai SRA
19	FW	Lee Eun-young (이은영)	31 March 2002 (aged 21)	2	0	(Korea Football Association) Korea University-Sejong

Group E

Pos	Team	Pld	W	D	L	GF	GA	GD	Pts	Qualification
1	South Korea	3	3	0	0	13	1	+12	9	Knockout stage
2	Philippines	3	2	0	1	7	6	+1	6	Knockout stage
3	Myanmar	3	1	0	2	1	6	−5	3	
4	Hong Kong	3	0	0	3	1	9	−8	0	

Source: Football – Women – Groups
Rules for classification: Group stage tiebreakers
22 September 2023
19:30 UTC+8

South Korea	3–0	Myanmar
Lee Eun-young 24'; Ji So-yun 60'; Jeon Eun-ha 68'	Report

Wenzhou Sports Center Stadium, Wenzhou
Attendance: 3,234
Referee: Doumouh Al Bakkar (Lebanon)

25 September 2023
19:30 UTC+8

Philippines	1–5	South Korea
Bolden 8'	Report	Chun Ga-ram 12'; Son Hwa-yeon 44', 56', 70'; Ji So-yun 52' (pen.)

Wenzhou Sports Center Stadium, Wenzhou
Attendance: 2,974
Referee: Asaka Koizumi (Japan)

28 September 2023
19:30 UTC+8

South Korea	5–0	Hong Kong
Moon Mi-ra 29', 45+1'; Mun Eun-ju 47', 70'; Wu Choi Yiu 52' (o.g.)	Report

Wenzhou Olympic Sports Center Stadium, Wenzhou
Attendance: 22,083
Referee: Le Thi Ly (Vietnam)

Quarterfinal

30 September 2023
16:30 UTC+8

South Korea	1–4	North Korea
An Myong-song 11' (o.g.)	Report	Ri Hak 20', 90'; An Myong-song 81'; Kim Kyong-yong 90+5' (pen.)

Wenzhou Sports Centre, Wenzhou
Attendance: 6,171
Referee: Chaisanit Pansa (Thailand)

== Kurash ==
Men

Athlete	Event	Round of 16	Quarter-finals	Semi-finals	Final	
Athlete	Event	Opposition Score	Opposition Score	Opposition Score	Opposition Score	Rank
Kwon Jae-deog	–66 kg	Keshav (IND); W 10–0	Kurbanov (TKM); W 8–0	Shturbabin (UZB); L 0–10	Did not advance	3rd place, bronze medalist(s)
Kim Min-gyu	–90 kg	Bye	Ishaq Zai (AFG)			
Jeong Jun-yong	+90 kg	Misri (KUW); W 5−0	Nacif (LBN); W 5−0	Tejenov (TKM); L 0−10	Did not advance	3rd place, bronze medalist(s)

Women

Athlete	Event	Round of 32	Round of 16	Quarter-finals	Semi-finals	Final	
Athlete	Event	Opposition Score	Opposition Score	Opposition Score	Opposition Score	Opposition Score	Rank
Oh Yeong-ji	–52 kg	Bye	Raksat (THA); W 3–3	Amanova (TKM); L 0–3	Did not advance		
Lee Ye-joo	–52 kg	Bye	Balhara (IND); L 3−5	Did not advance			
An Ye-seul	–70 kg	—N/a	Tsogt-Ochir (MGL); L 0−10	Did not advance			
Lee Sun-ah	–70 kg	—N/a	Kakhorova (UZB); L 0−10	Did not advance			

== Sport climbing ==
Speed

Athlete	Event	Qualification		Round of 16	Quarter-finals	Semi-finals	Final / BM	
Athlete	Event	Best	Rank	Opposition Time	Opposition Time	Opposition Time	Opposition Time	Rank
Lee Seung-beom	Men's	5.351	5 Q	Lee Y-s (KOR); W 5.525–6.105	R Alipour (IRI); L 5.417–5.162	Did not advance		
Lee Yong-su	Men's	5.650	12 Q	Lee S-b (KOR); L 6.105–5.525	Did not advance			
Noh Hee-ju	Women's	8.154	8 Q	Marlenova (KAZ); W 8.017–8.508	Dewi (INA); L 8.017–6.703	Did not advance		
Jeong Ji-min	Women's	8.712	11 Q	Darabian (IRI); W 7.062–7.943	Sallsabillah (INA); L 9.801–6.733	Did not advance		

Speed relay

Athlete	Event	Qualification		Quarter-finals	Semi-finals	Final / BM	
Athlete	Event	Time	Rank	Opposition Time	Opposition Time	Opposition Time	Rank
Jung Yong-jun; Lee Seung-beom; Lee Yong-su	Men's	20.201	5 Q	Kazakhstan (KAZ); W 18.025–18.691	Indonesia (INA); L 16.650–16.289	Singapore (SGP); W 17.827–23.169	3rd place, bronze medalist(s)
Choi Na-woo; Jeong Ji-min; Noh Hee-ju	Women's	25.151	2 Q	—N/a	Indonesia (INA); L 26.954–21.869	Kazakhstan (KAZ); W 26.901–27.998	3rd place, bronze medalist(s)

Combined

Athlete	Event	Qualification				Semi-finals				Final			
Athlete	Event	Boulder Point	Lead Point	Total	Rank	Boulder Point	Lead Point	Total	Rank	Boulder Point	Lead Point	Total	Rank
Chon Jong-won	Men's	99.9	64.1	164.0	5 Q	84.4	42.1	126.5	4 Q	69.6	16	85.6	4
Lee Do-hyun	Men's	100	100	200	1 Q	69.3	72	141.3	2 Q	64.6	54.1	118.7	2nd place, silver medalist(s)
Sa Sol	Women's	79.6	39	118.6	4 Q	59.46	64	123.46	5	Cancelled (Note: The women's boulder and lead final has been cancelled due to rain and safety of the athletes. The semi-finals result would be used as final result.)			
Seo Chae-hyun	Women's	79.9	96.1	176.0	2 Q	99.73	100	199.73	2nd place, silver medalist(s)	Cancelled			

== Tennis ==
Men

Athlete	Event	Round of 64	Round of 32	Round of 16	Quarter-finals	Semi-finals	Final	
Athlete	Event	Opposition Score	Opposition Score	Opposition Score	Opposition Score	Opposition Score	Opposition Score	Rank
Hong Seong-chan	Singles	Bye	Fomin (UZB); W 6–1, 4–1^{r}	Lý (VIE); W 6–1, 6–4	Wong (HKG); W 4–6, 6–4, 6–3	Watanuki (JPN); L 2–6, 1–6	Did not advance	3rd place, bronze medalist(s)
Kwon Soon-woo	Singles	Bye	Samrej (THA); L 3–6, 7–5, 4–6	Did not advance				
Hong Seong-chan; Kwon Soon-woo	Doubles	—N/a	Wong / Wong (HKG); W 6–2, 6–2	Suksumrarn / Trongcharoenchaikul (THA); W 6–3, 6–3	Hazawa / Uesugi (JPN); W 6–2, 6–4	Myneni / Ramanathan (IND); L 1–6, 7–6^{(8–6)}, [0–10]	Did not advance	3rd place, bronze medalist(s)
Nam Ji-sung; Song Min-kyu	Doubles	—N/a	Lý / Nguyễn (VIE); W 6–4, 7–5	Lomakin / Popko (KAZ); W 6–3, 5–7, [10–7]	Isaro / Jones (THA); L 4–6, 6–3, [7–10]	Did not advance		

Women

Athlete	Event	Round of 64	Round of 32	Round of 16	Quarter-finals	Semi-finals	Final	
Athlete	Event	Opposition Score	Opposition Score	Opposition Score	Opposition Score	Opposition Score	Opposition Score	Rank
Han Na-lae	Singles	Bye	Chogsomjav (MGL); W 6–1, 6–3	Sawangkaew (THA); W 1–6, 6–2, 7–5	Zhu (CHN); L 6–7^{(3–7)}, 3–6	Did not advance		
Park So-hyun	Singles	Bye	Rana (NEP); W 6–0, 6–1	Chong (HKG); W 6–3, 6–3	Zheng (CHN); L 6–7^{(4–7)}, 0–6	Did not advance		
Back Da-yeon; Jeong Bo-young	Doubles	—N/a	Bista / Rana (NEP); W 6–1, 6–0	Wang / Yang (CHN); W 3–5^{r}	Gumulya / Rompies (INA); W 4–6, 7–6^{(7–4)}, [10–4]	Lee / Liang (TPE); L 2–6, 6–4, [9–11]	Did not advance	3rd place, bronze medalist(s)
Ku Yeon-woo; Park So-hyun	Doubles	—N/a	Iu / Leong (MAC); W 6–0, 6–0	Kobori / Shimizu (JPN); W 6–4, 6–4	Sutjiadi / Tjen (INA); L 2–6, 4–6	Did not advance		

Mixed

Athlete	Event	Round of 64	Round of 32	Round of 16	Quarter-finals	Semi-finals	Final	
Athlete	Event	Opposition Score	Opposition Score	Opposition Score	Opposition Score	Opposition Score	Opposition Score	Rank
Han Na-lae; Chung Yun-seong	Doubles	Bye	C Wong / Wong H-k (HKG); W 6–2, 6–1	Rompies / Susanto (INA); W 6–1, 6–2	Liang / Huang (TPE); L 5–7, 7–5, [4–10]	Did not advance		
Kim Da-bin; Lee Jea-moon	Doubles	Bye	Kulambayeva / Lomakin (KAZ); L 6–7^{(5–7)}, 5–7	Did not advance				

== Wushu ==
=== Taolu ===
Athlete	Event	Event 1		Event 2		Total	Rank
Athlete	Event	Result	Rank	Result	Rank	Total	Rank
Park Geun-woo	Men's changquan	9.413	11	—N/a		9.413	11
Lee Yong-mun	Men's nanquan and nangun	9.736	2	9.736	3	19.472	2nd place, silver medalist(s)
Yun Dong-hae	Men's nanquan and nangun	9.703	8	9.706	8	19.409	7
An Hyeong-gi	Men's taijiquan and taijijian	9.736	5	9.630	10	19.366	9
Yu Won-hee	Men's taijiquan and taijijian	9.746	2	9.723	7	19.469	4
Lee Yong-hyun	Men's daoshu and gunshu	9.386	9	9.586	7	18.972	8
Seo Hee-ju	Women's jianshu and qiangshu	9.713	4	9.710	4	19.423	4

=== Sanda ===
Athlete	Event	Round of 16	Quarter-finals	Semi-finals	Final	
Athlete	Event	Opposition Score	Opposition Score	Opposition Score	Opposition Score	Rank
Hong Min-jun	Men's –56 kg	Alsendi (YEM); W 2–0	Hứa (VIE); L 0–2	Did not advance		
Kim Min-soo	Men's –60 kg	Balawardana (SRI); W 2–1	Singh (IND); W 2–0	Wang (CHN); L 0–2	Did not advance	3rd place, bronze medalist(s)
Jeon Seong-jin	Men's –65 kg	Rasoli (AFG); W 2–0	Kamolklang (THA); W KO	Salimi (IRI); L 0–2	Did not advance	3rd place, bronze medalist(s)
Song Gi-cheol	Men's –70 kg	Mohammadseifi (IRI); L 0–2	Did not advance			
