= Shooting at the 2022 Asian Games =

- Venue: Fuyang Yinhu Sports Centre
- Dates: 24 September – 1 October 2023
- Competitors: 470 from 36 nations

Shooting at the 2022 Asian Games was held in Fuyang Yinhu Sports Centre in Hangzhou, China between 24 September and 1 October 2023.

== Schedule ==
●	1st day	●	Final day	Q	Qualification	F	Final

Event↓/Date →	24th Sun		25th Mon		26th Tue		27th Wed		28th Thu		29th Fri		30th Sat		1st Sun	
Men's 10 m air pistol									Q	F						
Men's 10 m air pistol team									●							
Men's 25 m air rapid fire pistol	Q		Q	F												
Men's 25 m air rapid fire pistol team	●		●													
Men's 10 m air rifle			Q	F												
Men's 10 m air rifle team			●													
Men's 50 m rifle 3 positions											Q	F				
Men's 50 m rifle 3 positions team											●					
Men's 10 m running target			●													
Men's 10 m running target team			●													
Men's 10 m running target mixed					●											
Men's 10 m running target mixed team					●											
Men's trap													Q		Q	F
Men's trap team													●		●	
Men's skeet					Q		Q	F								
Men's skeet team					●		●									
Women's 10 m air pistol											Q	F				
Women's 10 m air pistol team											●					
Women's 25 m pistol					Q		Q	F								
Women's 25 m pistol team					●		●									
Women's 10 m air rifle	Q	F														
Women's 10 m air rifle team	●															
Women's 50 m rifle 3 positions							Q	F								
Women's 50 m rifle 3 positions team							●									
Women's 10 m running target									●							
Women's 10 m running target team									●							
Women's trap													Q		Q	F
Women's trap team													●		●	
Women's skeet					Q		Q	F								
Women's skeet team					●		●									
Mixed 10 m air pistol team													Q	F		
Mixed 10 m air rifle team					Q	F										
Mixed skeet team									Q	F						

== Medalists ==
=== Men ===
Event	Gold	Silver	Bronze
10 m air pistol	Phạm Quang Huy; Vietnam	Lee Won-ho; South Korea	Vladimir Svechnikov; Uzbekistan
10 m air pistol team	India; Arjun Singh Cheema; Shiva Narwal; Sarabjot Singh	China; Liu Jinyao; Xie Yu; Zhang Bowen	Vietnam; Lại Công Minh; Phạm Quang Huy; Phan Công Minh
25 m rapid fire pistol	Li Yuehong; China	Liu Yangpan; China	Nikita Chiryukin; Kazakhstan
25 m rapid fire pistol team	China; Li Yuehong; Liu Yangpan; Wang Xinjie	South Korea; Kim Seo-jun; Lee Gun-hyeok; Song Jong-ho	India; Anish Bhanwala; Vijayveer Sidhu; Adarsh Singh
10 m air rifle	Sheng Lihao; China	Park Ha-jun; South Korea	Aishwary Pratap Singh Tomar; India
10 m air rifle team	India; Divyansh Singh Panwar; Rudrankksh Patil; Aishwary Pratap Singh Tomar	South Korea; Kim Sang-do; Nam Tae-yun; Park Ha-jun	China; Du Linshu; Sheng Lihao; Yu Haonan
50 m rifle 3 positions	Du Linshu; China	Aishwary Pratap Singh Tomar; India	Tian Jiaming; China
50 m rifle 3 positions team	India; Swapnil Kusale; Akhil Sheoran; Aishwary Pratap Singh Tomar	China; Du Linshu; Tian Jiaming; Yu Hao	South Korea; Kim Jong-hyun; Kim Sang-do; Mo Dai-seong
10 m running target	Muhammad Sejahtera Dwi Putra; Indonesia	Ngô Hữu Vượng; Vietnam	Jeong You-jin; South Korea
10 m running target team	South Korea; Ha Kwang-chul; Jeong You-jin; Kwak Yong-bin	North Korea; Kwon Kwang-il; Pak Myong-won; Yu Song-jun	Indonesia; Muhammad Badri Akbar; Irfandi Julio; Muhammad Sejahtera Dwi Putra
10 m running target mixed	Muhammad Sejahtera Dwi Putra; Indonesia	Kwon Kwang-il; North Korea	Jeong You-jin; South Korea
10 m running target mixed team	South Korea; Ha Kwang-chul; Jeong You-jin; Kwak Yong-bin	Kazakhstan; Bakhtiyar Ibrayev; Andrey Khudyakov; Assadbek Nazirkulyev	Indonesia; Muhammad Badri Akbar; Irfandi Julio; Muhammad Sejahtera Dwi Putra
Trap	Qi Ying; China	Talal Al-Rashidi; Kuwait	Kynan Chenai; India
Trap team	India; Kynan Chenai; Zoravar Singh Sandhu; Prithviraj Tondaiman	Kuwait; Abdulrahman Al-Faihan; Khaled Al-Mudhaf; Talal Al-Rashidi	China; Guo Yuhao; Qi Ying; Wang Yuhao
Skeet	Abdullah Al-Rashidi; Kuwait	Anantjeet Singh Naruka; India	Nasser Al-Attiyah; Qatar
Skeet team	China; Han Xu; Liu Jiangchi; Wu Yunxuan	Qatar; Masoud Saleh Al-Athba; Rashid Saleh Al-Athba; Nasser Al-Attiyah	India; Angad Vir Singh Bajwa; Gurjoat Siingh Khangura; Anantjeet Singh Naruka

=== Women ===
Event	Gold	Silver	Bronze
10 m air pistol	Palak Gulia; India	Esha Singh; India	Kishmala Talat; Pakistan
10 m air pistol team	China; Jiang Ranxin; Li Xue; Zhao Nan	India; Palak Gulia; Esha Singh; Divya T. S.	Chinese Taipei; Liu Heng-yu; Wu Chia-ying; Yu Ai-wen
25 m pistol	Liu Rui; China	Esha Singh; India	Yang Ji-in; South Korea
25 m pistol team	India; Manu Bhaker; Rhythm Sangwan; Esha Singh	China; Feng Sixuan; Liu Rui; Zhao Nan	South Korea; Kim Lan-a; Sim Eun-ji; Yang Ji-in
10 m air rifle	Huang Yuting; China	Han Jiayu; China	Ramita Jindal; India
10 m air rifle team	China; Han Jiayu; Huang Yuting; Wang Zhilin	India; Ashi Chouksey; Mehuli Ghosh; Ramita Jindal	Mongolia; Gankhuyagiin Nandinzayaa; Chuluunbadrakhyn Narantuyaa; Oyuunbatyn Yesügen
50 m rifle 3 positions	Sift Kaur Samra; India	Zhang Qiongyue; China	Ashi Chouksey; India
50 m rifle 3 positions team	China; Han Jiayu; Xia Siyu; Zhang Qiongyue	India; Ashi Chouksey; Manini Kaushik; Sift Kaur Samra	South Korea; Bae Sang-hee; Lee Eun-seo; Lee Kye-rim
10 m running target	Zukhra Irnazarova; Kazakhstan	Ri Ji-ye; North Korea	Paek Ok-sim; North Korea
10 m running target team	North Korea; Paek Ok-sim; Pang Myong-hyang; Ri Ji-ye	Kazakhstan; Fatima Irnazarova; Zukhra Irnazarova; Alexandra Saduakassova	Indonesia; Rica Nensi Perangin Angin; Feny Bachtiar; Nourma Try Indriani
Trap	Zhang Xinqiu; China	Wu Cuicui; China	Mariya Dmitriyenko; Kazakhstan
Trap team	China; Li Qingnian; Wu Cuicui; Zhang Xinqiu	India; Manisha Keer; Rajeshwari Kumari; Preeti Rajak	Kazakhstan; Mariya Dmitriyenko; Aizhan Dosmagambetova; Anastassiya Prilepina
Skeet	Jiang Yiting; China	Gao Jinmei; China	Assem Orynbay; Kazakhstan
Skeet team	Kazakhstan; Zoya Kravchenko; Assem Orynbay; Olga Panarina	China; Gao Jinmei; Huang Sixue; Jiang Yiting	Thailand; Isarapa Imprasertsuk; Sutiya Jiewchaloemmit; Nutchaya Sutarporn

=== Mixed ===
Event	Gold	Silver	Bronze
10 m air pistol team	China; Zhang Bowen; Jiang Ranxin	India; Sarabjot Singh; Divya T. S.	South Korea; Lee Won-ho; Kim Bo-mi
10 m air pistol team	China; Zhang Bowen; Jiang Ranxin	India; Sarabjot Singh; Divya T. S.	Iran; Amir Joharikhoo; Hanieh Rostamian
10 m air rifle team	China; Sheng Lihao; Huang Yuting	Uzbekistan; Javokhir Sokhibov; Mukhtasar Tokhirova	Kazakhstan; Islam Satpayev; Alexandra Le
10 m air rifle team	China; Sheng Lihao; Huang Yuting	Uzbekistan; Javokhir Sokhibov; Mukhtasar Tokhirova	South Korea; Park Ha-jun; Lee Eun-seo
Skeet team	Kazakhstan; Eduard Yechshenko; Assem Orynbay	Kuwait; Abdullah Al-Rashidi; Eman Al-Shamaa	Qatar; Rashid Saleh Al-Athba; Reem Al-Sharshani
Skeet team	Kazakhstan; Eduard Yechshenko; Assem Orynbay	Kuwait; Abdullah Al-Rashidi; Eman Al-Shamaa	China; Liu Jiangchi; Jiang Yiting

== Medal table ==
Rank	Nation	Gold	Silver	Bronze	Total
1	China (CHN)	16	9	4	29
2	India (IND)	7	9	6	22
3	Kazakhstan (KAZ)	3	2	5	10
4	South Korea (KOR)	2	4	8	14
5	Indonesia (INA)	2	0	3	5
6	North Korea (PRK)	1	3	1	5
7	Kuwait (KUW)	1	3	0	4
8	Vietnam (VIE)	1	1	1	3
9	Qatar (QAT)	0	1	2	3
10	Uzbekistan (UZB)	0	1	1	2
11	Chinese Taipei (TPE)	0	0	1	1
11	Iran (IRI)	0	0	1	1
11	Mongolia (MGL)	0	0	1	1
11	Pakistan (PAK)	0	0	1	1
11	Thailand (THA)	0	0	1	1
Totals (15 entries)		33	33	36	102

== Participating nations ==
A total of 470 athletes from 36 nations competed in shooting at the 2022 Asian Games:

- Bahrain (13)
- Bangladesh (15)
- Bhutan (2)
- China (33)
- Chinese Taipei (18)
- Hong Kong (2)
- India (33)
- Indonesia (23)
- Iran (16)
- Japan (14)
- Jordan (6)
- Kazakhstan (33)
- Kuwait (19)
- Kyrgyzstan (4)
- Laos (3)
- Lebanon (6)
- Macau (6)
- Malaysia (10)
- Maldives (5)
- Mongolia (15)
- Nepal (2)
- North Korea (9)
- Oman (6)
- Pakistan (10)
- Philippines (10)
- Qatar (25)
- Saudi Arabia (12)
- Singapore (12)
- South Korea (35)
- Tajikistan (4)
- Thailand (28)
- Timor-Leste (2)
- United Arab Emirates (8)
- Uzbekistan (7)
- Vietnam (22)
- Yemen (2)
