= Shooting at the 2022 Asian Games – Men's 10 metre running target =

Men's 10 metre running target at the 2022 Asian Games
- Venue: Fuyang Yinhu Sports Centre
- Dates: 25 September 2023
- Competitors: 18 from 7 nations

Medalists
gold medal	Muhammad Sejahtera Dwi Putra	Indonesia
silver medal	Ngô Hữu Vượng	Vietnam
bronze medal	Jeong You-jin	South Korea

The men's 10 metre running target competition at the 2022 Asian Games in Hangzhou, China was held on 25 September 2023 at Fuyang Yinhu Sports Centre.

== Schedule ==
All times are China Standard Time (UTC+08:00)

Date	Time	Event
Monday, 25 September 2023	09:00	Final

== Records ==
Prior to this competition, the existing world, Asian and Games records were as follows.

World Record	Manfred Kurzer (GER)	590	Athens, Greece	19 August 2004
Asian Record	Zhai Yujia (CHN)	590	Guangzhou, China	16 November 2010
Games Record	Zhai Yujia (CHN)	590	Guangzhou, China	16 November 2010

== Results ==
Rank	Athlete	Slow			Fast			Total	Xs	S-off	Notes
Rank	Athlete	1	2	3	1	2	3	Total	Xs	S-off	Notes
1st place, gold medalist(s)	Muhammad Sejahtera Dwi Putra (INA)	99	97	95	95	94	98	578	15		
2nd place, silver medalist(s)	Ngô Hữu Vượng (VIE)	98	91	96	94	93	99	571	10		
3rd place, bronze medalist(s)	Jeong You-jin (KOR)	95	92	96	92	96	94	565	14	19	
4	Nguyễn Tuấn Anh (VIE)	98	94	95	92	89	97	565	12	18	
5	Pak Myong-won (PRK)	93	98	96	88	92	94	561	11		
6	Andrey Khudyakov (KAZ)	91	97	97	91	92	93	561	7		
7	Kwon Kwang-il (PRK)	96	97	91	91	92	92	559	12		
8	Kwak Yong-bin (KOR)	95	97	95	85	90	92	554	14		
9	Assadbek Nazirkulyev (KAZ)	96	92	92	88	95	91	554	12		
10	Li Jie (SGP)	92	97	99	86	92	87	553	8		
11	Bakhtiyar Ibrayev (KAZ)	93	90	94	91	88	93	549	12		
12	Ha Kwang-chul (KOR)	95	93	92	87	89	93	549	11		
13	Yu Song-jun (PRK)	93	96	95	91	86	87	548	6		
14	Muhammad Badri Akbar (INA)	95	96	93	83	87	92	546	7		
15	Mohammed Amin Sobhi (QAT)	90	97	95	83	92	87	544	10		
16	Irfandi Julio (INA)	95	93	90	88	92	85	543	11		
17	Mohammed Abouteama (QAT)	97	91	90	86	82	89	535	8		
18	Nguyễn Công Dậu (VIE)	95	88	88	82	89	89	531	6		
