= Shooting at the 2022 Asian Games – Men's 10 metre running target mixed =

Men's 10 metre running target mixed at the 2022 Asian Games
- Venue: Fuyang Yinhu Sports Centre
- Dates: 26 September 2023
- Competitors: 18 from 7 nations

Medalists
| gold medal | Muhammad Sejahtera Dwi Putra | Indonesia |
| silver medal | Kwon Kwang-il | North Korea |
| bronze medal | Jeong You-jin | South Korea |

The men's 10 metre running target mixed competition at the 2022 Asian Games in Hangzhou, China was held on 26 September 2023 at Fuyang Yinhu Sports Centre.

== Schedule ==
All times are China Standard Time (UTC+08:00)

| Date | Time | Event |
|---|---|---|
| Tuesday, 26 September 2023 | 09:00 | Final |

== Records ==
Prior to this competition, the existing world, Asian and Games records were as follows.

| World Record | Vladislav Prianishnikov (UKR) | 393 | Winterthur, Switzerland | 26 February 2008 |
| Asian Record | Niu Zhiyuan (CHN) | 390 | Barcelona, Spain | 20 July 1998 |
| Games Record | Gan Lin (CHN) | 389 | Doha, Qatar | 6 December 2006 |

== Results ==
| Rank | Athlete | Stage 1 | | Stage 2 | | Total | Xs | S-off | Notes |
| Rank | Athlete | 1 | 2 | 1 | 2 | Total | Xs | S-off | Notes |
|---|---|---|---|---|---|---|---|---|---|
| 1st place, gold medalist(s) | Muhammad Sejahtera Dwi Putra (INA) | 92 | 97 | 94 | 95 | 378 | 11 | | |
| 2nd place, silver medalist(s) | Kwon Kwang-il (PRK) | 95 | 91 | 95 | 96 | 377 | 9 | 18 | |
| 3rd place, bronze medalist(s) | Jeong You-jin (KOR) | 92 | 96 | 97 | 92 | 377 | 6 | 17 | |
| 4 | Assadbek Nazirkulyev (KAZ) | 90 | 93 | 96 | 95 | 374 | 10 | | |
| 5 | Li Jie (SGP) | 91 | 95 | 96 | 92 | 374 | 8 | | |
| 6 | Nguyễn Tuấn Anh (VIE) | 95 | 92 | 94 | 93 | 374 | 7 | | |
| 7 | Ha Kwang-chul (KOR) | 94 | 92 | 93 | 94 | 373 | 9 | | |
| 8 | Bakhtiyar Ibrayev (KAZ) | 91 | 96 | 89 | 95 | 371 | 5 | | |
| 9 | Pak Myong-won (PRK) | 96 | 93 | 89 | 91 | 369 | 8 | | |
| 10 | Ngô Hữu Vượng (VIE) | 86 | 97 | 95 | 90 | 368 | 4 | | |
| 11 | Kwak Yong-bin (KOR) | 96 | 92 | 90 | 88 | 366 | 6 | | |
| 12 | Andrey Khudyakov (KAZ) | 88 | 90 | 95 | 93 | 366 | 5 | | |
| 13 | Irfandi Julio (INA) | 90 | 91 | 91 | 90 | 362 | 5 | | |
| 14 | Mohammed Amin Sobhi (QAT) | 85 | 90 | 96 | 90 | 361 | 4 | | |
| 15 | Mohammed Abouteama (QAT) | 93 | 88 | 90 | 89 | 360 | 3 | | |
| 16 | Muhammad Badri Akbar (INA) | 88 | 84 | 98 | 88 | 358 | 6 | | |
| 17 | Yu Song-jun (PRK) | 90 | 92 | 84 | 85 | 351 | 6 | | |
| 18 | Nguyễn Công Dậu (VIE) | 91 | 88 | 84 | 87 | 350 | 3 | | |
