= Swimming at the 2024 Summer Olympics – Men's 200-metre freestyle =

Men's 200 metre freestyle at the Games of the XXXIII Olympiad
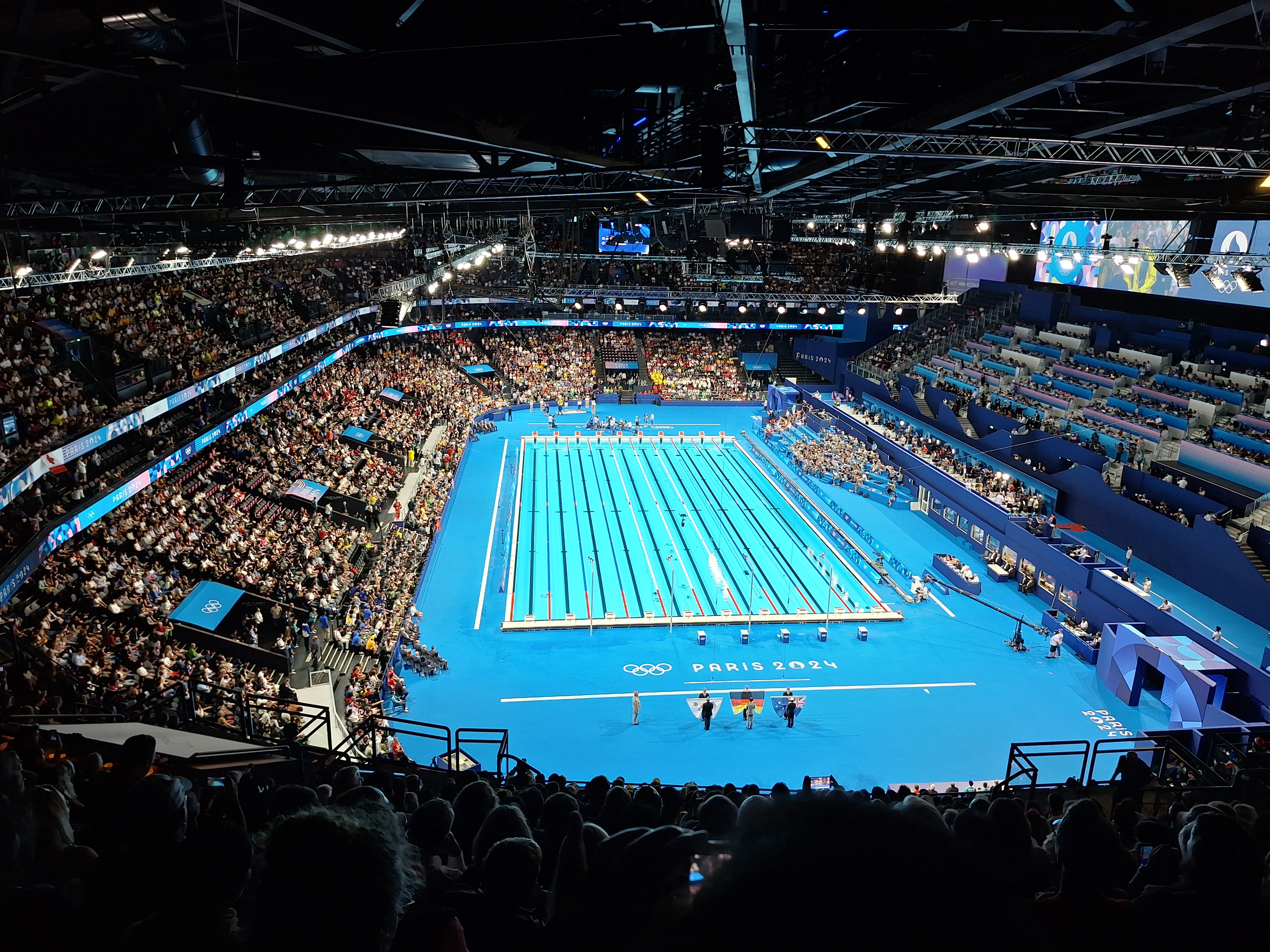
- Paris La Défense Arena after it was converted to a swimming pool for the swimming events
- Venue: Paris La Défense Arena
- Dates: 28 July 2024 (Heats and Semis); 29 July 2024 (Final)
- Competitors: 28 from 21 nations
- Winning time: 1:44.72

Medalists
1st place, gold medalist(s)		David Popovici	Romania
2nd place, silver medalist(s)		Matthew Richards	Great Britain
3rd place, bronze medalist(s)		Luke Hobson	United States

The men's 200 metre freestyle event at the 2024 Summer Olympics was held on 28 and 29 July 2024 at Paris La Défense Arena, which was converted to an Olympic-size swimming pool for the swimming events.

Romanian David Popovici was considered by SwimSwam and Swimming World as the most likely to win the event, while Matt Richards and Duncan Scott of Great Britain, Hwang Sun-woo of South Korea, Danas Rapšys of Lithuania, Lukas Märtens of Germany and the US' Luke Hobson were also possible contenders for medals. All except Hwang made it through to the final.

In the final, Märtens was in first place up until the final turn, when Hobson took the lead. Richards overtook him during the final length, and 195 metres into the race, Richards was in first, Hobson was in second and Popovici was in third. Over the final five metres Popovici overtook both to win gold with a time of 1:44.72, while Richards won silver with 1:44.74 and Hobson won bronze with 1:44.79. The 0.02 margin of victory was the smallest ever seen in this event at the Olympics, and Popovici's gold was the first Olympic medal for Romania since 2004.

== Background ==
Romanian David Popovici won the event at the 2022 World Championships, while Great Britain's Matt Richards won it at the 2023 Championships. Duncan Scott, also from Great Britain, won silver at the 2023 Championships. South Korea's Hwang won the 2024 World Championships, ahead of Lithuania's Danas Rapšys in second and the US' Luke Hobson in third. Great Britain's Tom Dean won the event at the previous Olympics, but since each competing nation was only allowed to enter two athletes, and Richards and Scott had been chosen to swim instead of him, he did not compete. Popovici won the 2024 European Championships with a time of 1:43.13, which was the fastest qualifying time ahead of German Lukas Märtens' time of 1:44.14. Both SwimSwam and Swimming World predicted Popovici would win the event.

Prior to the event, the world record was 1:42.00, set by Paul Biedermann of Germany in 2009. The Olympic record was 1:42.96, set by Michael Phelps of the US in 2008.

The event was held at Paris La Défense Arena, which was converted to a swimming pool for the swimming events.

== Qualification ==
Each National Olympic Committee (NOC) was permitted to enter a maximum of two qualified athletes in each individual event, but only if both of them had attained the Olympic Qualifying Time (OQT). For this event, the OQT was 1:46.26. World Aquatics then considered athletes qualifying through universality; NOCs were given one event entry for each gender, which could be used by any athlete regardless of qualification time, providing the spaces had not already been taken by athletes from that nation who had achieved the OQT. Finally, the rest of the spaces were filled by athletes who had met the Olympic Consideration Time (OCT), which was 1:46.79 for this event. In total, 21 athletes qualified through achieving the OQT, four athletes qualified through universality places and three athletes qualified through achieving the OCT.

Top 10 fastest qualification times
Swimmer	Country	Time	Competition
David Popovici	Romania	1:43.13	2024 European Aquatics Championships
Lukas Märtens	Germany	1:44.14	2024 German Championships
Matthew Richards	Great Britain	1:44.30	2023 World Aquatics Championships
Hwang Sun-woo	South Korea	1:44.40	2022 Asian Games
Duncan Scott	Great Britain	1:44.75	2024 Aquatics GB Swimming Championships
Maximillian Giuliani	Australia	1:44.79	Hancock Prospecting Queensland Championships 2023
Luke Hobson	United States	1:44.87	2023 World Aquatics Championships
Danas Rapšys	Lithuania	1:44.96	2024 World Aquatics Championships
Katsuhiro Matsumoto	Japan	1:44.98	2024 Japanese Championships
Pan Zhanle	China	1:45.28	2022 Asian Games

== Heats ==
Four heats (preliminary rounds) took place on 28 July 2024, starting at 11:00. (Note: All times are Central European Summer Time (UTC+2)) The swimmers with the best 16 times in the heats advanced to the semifinals. Popovici led heat four from beginning to end to finish with the fastest qualifying time of 1:45.65, while Rapšys won heat three with the second fastest qualifying time of 1:45.91. Belgian Lucas Henveaux swam a national record of 1:46.04 to qualify third.

Results
Rank	Heat	Lane	Swimmer	Nation	Time	Notes
1	4	4	David Popovici	Romania	1:45.65	Q
2	3	3	Danas Rapšys	Lithuania	1:45.91	Q
3	4	8	Lucas Henveaux	Belgium	1:46.04	Q, NR
4	4	5	Hwang Sun-woo	South Korea	1:46.13	Q
5	2	5	Maximillian Giuliani	Australia	1:46.15	Q
6	2	4	Matthew Richards	Great Britain	1:46.19	Q
7	2	3	Katsuhiro Matsumoto	Japan	1:46.23	Q
7	4	3	Luke Hobson	United States	1:46.23	Q
9	4	2	Thomas Neill	Australia	1:46.27	Q
10	3	4	Lukas Märtens	Germany	1:46.33	Q
11	3	5	Duncan Scott	Great Britain	1:46.34	Q
12	2	6	Kim Woo-min	South Korea	1:46.64	Q
13	2	2	Rafael Miroslaw	Germany	1:46.81	Q
14	2	1	Denis Loktev	Israel	1:47.01	Q
15	3	2	Alessandro Ragaini	Italy	1:47.31	Q
16	3	7	Filippo Megli	Italy	1:47.39	Q
17	2	8	Antonio Djakovic	Switzerland	1:47.46	
18	1	4	Velimir Stjepanović	Serbia	1:47.56	
19	3	6	Chris Guiliano	United States	1:47.60	
20	3	8	Jorge Iga	Mexico	1:48.38	
21	1	5	Saso Boskan	Slovenia	1:48.75	
22	4	6	Pan Zhanle	China	1:49.47	
23	4	7	Ji Xinjie	China	1:49.88	
24	1	3	Omar Abbass	Syria	1:53.01	
25	1	6	Muhammad Ahmed Durrani	Pakistan	1:58.67	
	4	1	Guilherme Costa	Brazil	DNS	
	3	1	Nándor Németh	Hungary	DNS	
	2	7	Felix Auböck	Austria	DNS	

== Semifinals ==
Two semifinals took place on 28 July, starting at 20:46. The swimmers with the best eight times in the semifinals advanced to the final. Popovici led from beginning to end to win the second semifinal with the fastest qualifying time of 1:44.53, while Scott finished behind him with the second fastest qualifying time of 1:44.94. Hobson won the first semifinal with 1:45.19, which was the third fastest qualifying time. Hobson, Märtens, Australian Maximillian Giuliani, Rapšys, Richards and Japan's Katsuhiro Matsumoto also qualified. Hwang did not qualify.

Results
Rank	Heat	Lane	Swimmer	Nation	Time	Notes
1	2	4	David Popovici	Romania	1:44.53	Q
2	2	7	Duncan Scott	Great Britain	1:44.94	Q
3	1	6	Luke Hobson	United States	1:45.19	Q
4	1	2	Lukas Märtens	Germany	1:45.36	Q
5	2	3	Maximillian Giuliani	Australia	1:45.37	Q
6	1	4	Danas Rapšys	Lithuania	1:45.48	Q
7	1	3	Matthew Richards	Great Britain	1:45.63	Q
8	2	6	Katsuhiro Matsumoto	Japan	1:45.88	Q
9	1	5	Hwang Sun-woo	South Korea	1:45.92	
10	2	2	Thomas Neill	Australia	1:46.18	
11	2	5	Lucas Henveaux	Belgium	1:46.20	
12	1	7	Kim Woo-min	South Korea	1:46.58	
13	1	8	Filippo Megli	Italy	1:46.87	
14	2	8	Alessandro Ragaini	Italy	1:47.08	
15	2	1	Rafael Miroslaw	Germany	1:47.34	
16	1	1	Denis Loktev	Israel	1:47.93	

== Final ==
The final took place at 20:41 on 29 July. After Richards had the fastest start, Märtens overtook him and retained the lead up until the 150 metre mark, which was three quarters of the way through the race. SwimSwam later opined that Märtens lost his chance at a medal due to his slow last tumble turn and underwater.

At 165 metres, Hobson had taken the lead, but by 175 metres Richards was first. At the 195 metre mark Richards was first, Hobson was second and Popovici was third. In what SwimSwam called a "wild finish", Popovici won gold with a time of 1:44.72, 0.02 seconds ahead of Richards in second, who in turn was 0.05 seconds ahead of Hobson, who came third. The 0.02 margin of victory was the smallest ever seen in this event at the Olympics.

During the race, Hobson had the fastest tumble turns and underwaters, while Popovici swam the fastest during the front crawl sections. Popovici's gold was the first Olympic swimming medal for Romania since 2004, and after the race he called winning a "dream come true", adding, "I don't know how to describe it. It's so simple, yet so beautiful."

Results
Rank	Lane	Swimmer	Nation	Time	Notes
1st place, gold medalist(s)	4	David Popovici	Romania	1:44.72	
2nd place, silver medalist(s)	1	Matthew Richards	Great Britain	1:44.74	
3rd place, bronze medalist(s)	3	Luke Hobson	United States	1:44.79	
4	5	Duncan Scott	Great Britain	1:44.87	
5	6	Lukas Märtens	Germany	1:45.46	
5	7	Danas Rapšys	Lithuania	1:45.46	
7	2	Maximillian Giuliani	Australia	1:45.57	
8	8	Katsuhiro Matsumoto	Japan	1:46.26	

Statistics
Name	50 metre split	100 metre split	150 metre split	Time	Stroke rate (strokes/min)
David Popovici	24.10	51.12	1:17.98	1:44.72	44.6
Matthew Richards	24.16	50.92	1:17.99	1:44.74	40.9
Luke Hobson	24.70	51.37	1:18.00	1:44.79	40.3
Duncan Scott	24.46	51.21	1:18.10	1:44.87	45.5
Lukas Märtens	24.05	50.52	1:17.61	1:45.46	44.2
Danas Rapšys	24.67	51.23	1:18.37	1:45.46	42.4
Maximillian Giuliani	24.61	51.66	1:18.51	1:45.57	42.2
Katsuhiro Matsumoto	24.36	51.12	1:18.87	1:46.26	38.4
