= Kurash at the 2022 Asian Games – Men's 90 kg =

Men's 90 kg at the 2022 Asian Games
- Venue: Xiaoshan Linpu Gymnasium
- Dates: 2 October 2023
- Competitors: 9 from 9 nations

Medalists
gold medal	Sadegh Azarang	Iran
silver medal	Kim Min-gyu	South Korea
bronze medal	Khaknazar Nazarov	Tajikistan
bronze medal	Işanmyrat Ataýew	Turkmenistan

The men's 90 kilograms kurash competition at the 2022 Asian Games in Hangzhou was held on 2 October 2023 at the Xiaoshan Linpu Gymnasium.

Kurash is a traditional martial art from Uzbekistan that resembles wrestling. There are three assessment systems in Kurash, namely Halal, Yambosh, and Chala.

== Schedule ==
All times are China Standard Time (UTC+08:00)

Date	Time	Event
Monday, 2 October 2023	09:30	Round of 16
Monday, 2 October 2023	09:30	Quarterfinals
Monday, 2 October 2023	14:00	Semifinals
Monday, 2 October 2023	14:00	Final

== Results ==
Round of 16
Khaknazar Nazarov (TJK)	001
Zhamalbek Asylbek Uulu (KGZ)	001

Quarterfinals
Chisato Komatsu (JPN)	000
Khaknazar Nazarov (TJK)	100
Kim Min-gyu (KOR)	111
Ajmal Ishaqzai (AFG)	000
Sadegh Azarang (IRI)	101
Yash Kumar Chauhan (IND)	000
Bùi Minh Quân (VIE)	000
Işanmyrat Ataýew (TKM)	010

Semifinals
Khaknazar Nazarov (TJK)	002
Kim Min-gyu (KOR)	002
Sadegh Azarang (IRI)	101
Işanmyrat Ataýew (TKM)	000

Final
Kim Min-gyu (KOR)	000
Sadegh Azarang (IRI)	100
