= Ju-jitsu at the 2022 Asian Games – Women's 63 kg =

Women's jiu-jitsu 63 kg at the 2022 Asian Games
- Venue: Xiaoshan Linpu Gymnasium
- Dates: 7 October 2023
- Competitors: 16 from 11 nations

Medalists
gold medal	Shamma Al-Kalbani	United Arab Emirates
silver medal	Sung Ki-ra	South Korea
bronze medal	Marian Urdabayeva	Kazakhstan
bronze medal	Choi Hee-joo	South Korea

The women's jiu-jitsu (ne-waza) 63 kilograms Ju-jitsu competition at the 2022 Asian Games in Hangzhou was held on 7 October 2023 at Xiaoshan Linpu Gymnasium.

== Schedule ==
All times are China Standard Time (UTC+08:00)

Date	Time	Event
Saturday, 7 October 2023	09:00	Elimination round of 16
Saturday, 7 October 2023	09:00	Quarterfinals
Saturday, 7 October 2023	09:00	Semifinals
Saturday, 7 October 2023	09:00	Repechage round 1
Saturday, 7 October 2023	15:00	Finals

== Results ==
Legend

- SU — Won by submission (50–0)

=== Main bracket ===
Elimination round of 16
Shamma Al-Kalbani (UAE)	2^{SU}
Hoàng Thị Nhật Quế (VIE)	2
Bayarmaagiin Khongorzul (MGL)	21^{SU}
Kiran Kumari (IND)	0
Azhar Salykova (KAZ)	3^{SU}
Onanong Sangsirichok (THA)	0
Choi Hee-joo (KOR)	2^{SU}
Ilma Yeni Megawati (INA)	2
Sung Ki-ra (KOR)	20
Titapa Junsookplung (THA)	0
Muhra Mahfoodh (UAE)	6^{SU}
Ozoda Nurmatova (UZB)	2
Yara Kakish (JOR)	0
Andrea Lao (PHI)	0
Battsogtyn Buyandelger (MGL)	0
Marian Urdabayeva (KAZ)	0

Quarterfinals
Shamma Al-Kalbani (UAE)	0^{SU}
Bayarmaagiin Khongorzul (MGL)	0
Azhar Salykova (KAZ)	0
Choi Hee-joo (KOR)	2
Sung Ki-ra (KOR)	4^{SU}
Muhra Mahfoodh (UAE)	2
Andrea Lao (PHI)	0
Marian Urdabayeva (KAZ)	3

Semifinals
Shamma Al-Kalbani (UAE)	6
Choi Hee-joo (KOR)	0
Sung Ki-ra (KOR)	9
Marian Urdabayeva (KAZ)	2

Final
Shamma Al-Kalbani (UAE)	8
Sung Ki-ra (KOR)	4

=== Repechage ===
Repechage round 1
Bayarmaagiin Khongorzul (MGL)	0
Azhar Salykova (KAZ)	4^{SU}
Muhra Mahfoodh (UAE)	0
Andrea Lao (PHI)	6^{SU}

Contests for bronze medals
Azhar Salykova (KAZ)	0
Marian Urdabayeva (KAZ)	7
Andrea Lao (PHI)	0
Choi Hee-joo (KOR)	4
