= Shooting at the 2022 Asian Games – Men's 10 metre running target mixed team =

Men's 10 metre running target mixed team at the 2022 Asian Games
- Venue: Fuyang Yinhu Sports Centre
- Dates: 26 September 2023
- Competitors: 15 from 5 nations

Medalists
gold medal	South Korea; Ha Kwang-chul, Jeong You-jin, Kwak Yong-bin
silver medal	Kazakhstan; Bakhtiyar Ibrayev, Andrey Khudyakov, Assadbek Nazirkulyev
bronze medal	Indonesia; Muhammad Badri Akbar, Irfandi Julio, Muhammad Sejahtera Dwi Putra

The men's 10 metre running target mixed team competition at the 2022 Asian Games in Hangzhou, China was held on 26 September 2023 at the Fuyang Yinhu Sports Centre.

== Schedule ==
All times are China Standard Time (UTC+08:00)

Date	Time	Event
Tuesday, 26 September 2023	09:00	Final

== Records ==
Prior to this competition, the existing world, Asian and Games records were as follows.

World Record	Russia	1158	Thessaloniki, Greece	22 March 2002
Asian Record	China	1145	Lahti, Finland	6 July 2002
Games Record	North Korea	1141	Guangzhou, China	17 November 2010

== Results ==
Rank	Team	Stage 1		Stage 2		Total	Xs	Notes
Rank	Team	1	2	1	2	Total	Xs	Notes
1st place, gold medalist(s)	South Korea (KOR)	282	280	280	274	1116	21	
	Ha Kwang-chul	94	92	93	94	373	9	
	Jeong You-jin	92	96	97	92	377	6	
	Kwak Yong-bin	96	92	90	88	366	6	
2nd place, silver medalist(s)	Kazakhstan (KAZ)	269	279	280	283	1111	20	
	Bakhtiyar Ibrayev	91	96	89	95	371	5	
	Andrey Khudyakov	88	90	95	93	366	5	
	Assadbek Nazirkulyev	90	93	96	95	374	10	
3rd place, bronze medalist(s)	Indonesia (INA)	270	272	283	273	1098	22	
	Muhammad Badri Akbar	88	84	98	88	358	6	
	Irfandi Julio	90	91	91	90	362	5	
	Muhammad Sejahtera Dwi Putra	92	97	94	95	378	11	
4	North Korea (PRK)	281	276	268	272	1097	23	
	Kwon Kwang-il	95	91	95	96	377	9	
	Pak Myong-won	96	93	89	91	369	8	
	Yu Song-jun	90	92	84	85	351	6	
5	Vietnam (VIE)	272	277	273	270	1092	14	
	Ngô Hữu Vượng	86	97	95	90	368	4	
	Nguyễn Công Dậu	91	88	84	87	350	3	
	Nguyễn Tuấn Anh	95	92	94	93	374	7	
