= Muhammad Sejahtera Dwi Putra =

Indonesian sport shooter

Personal information
- Nationality: Indonesian
- Born: 13 April 1997 (age 29) Jakarta, Indonesia
- Height: 1.68 m (5 ft 6 in)

Sport
- Country: Indonesia
- Sport: Shooting
- Event: Running target shooting
Medal record
Men's shooting
Representing Indonesia
Asian Games
Gold medal – first place	2022 Hangzhou	10 m running target
Gold medal – first place	2022 Hangzhou	10 m running target mixed
Silver medal – second place	2018 Jakarta–Palembang	10 m running target mixed
Bronze medal – third place	2022 Hangzhou	10 m running target team
Bronze medal – third place	2022 Hangzhou	10 m running target mixed team
Asian Championships
Silver medal – second place	2025 Shymkent	10 m running target
Asian Airgun Championships
Gold medal – first place	2021 Shymkent	10 m running target
Gold medal – first place	2021 Shymkent	10 m running target mixed
SEA Games
Gold medal – first place	2021 Vietnam	10 m running target
Silver medal – second place	2021 Vietnam	10 m running target team

Muhammad Sejahtera Dwi Putra (born 13 April 1997) is an Indonesian sport shooter. He won the gold medal in the 10 m running target event at the 2022 Asian Games held in Hangzhou, China. It was Indonesia's first gold medal in shooting at the Asian Games. He participated in 2022 World Running Target Championships in Châteauroux, France, finishing in fifth place.
