= Roller speed skating at the 2022 Asian Games – Men's 10000 metres points elimination =

Men's 10000 metres points elimination at the 2022 Asian Games
- Venue: Qiantang Roller Sports Centre
- Date: 30 September 2023
- Competitors: 14 from 8 nations

Medalists
gold medal	Jeong Byeong-hee	South Korea
silver medal	Zhang Zhenhai	China
bronze medal	Choi In-ho	South Korea

The Men's 10000 metres points elimination event at the 2022 Asian Games was held in Qiantang Roller Sports Centre, Hangzhou on 30 September 2023.

== Schedule ==
All times are China Standard Time (UTC+08:00)

Date	Time	Event
Saturday, 30 September 2023	09:35	Final

== Results ==
- EL — Eliminated

Rank	Athlete	Time	Score
1st place, gold medalist(s)	Jeong Byeong-hee (KOR)	15:39.867	19
2nd place, silver medalist(s)	Zhang Zhenhai (CHN)	15:41.727	14
3rd place, bronze medalist(s)	Choi In-ho (KOR)	15:41.883	11
4	Ko Fu-shiuan (TPE)	15:40.387	10
5	Chen Yan-cheng (TPE)	15:41.459	7
6	Anandkumar Velkumar (IND)	15:40.978	4
7	Siddhant Kamble (IND)	15:57.944	4
8	Amir Behzadi (IRI)	EL	
9	Katsuki Kato (JPN)	EL	
10	Pumipit Sintong (THA)	EL	
11	Suttikan Puakukam (THA)	EL	
12	Azad Hemmati (IRI)	EL	
13	Mai Hoài Phương (VIE)	EL	
14	Phạm Nhật Minh Quang (VIE)	EL	
