= 2022 FINA World Swimming Championships (25 m) – Men's 200 metre freestyle =

Swimming competition

Men's 200 metre freestyle at the 2022 FINA World Swimming Championships (25 m)
- Venue: Melbourne Sports and Aquatic Centre
- Location: Melbourne, Australia
- Dates: 18 December (heats and final)
- Competitors: 46 from 43 nations
- Winning time: 1:39.72 CR

Medalists
gold medal	Hwang Sun-woo	South Korea
silver medal	David Popovici	Romania
bronze medal	Tom Dean	Great Britain

The Men's 200 metre freestyle competition of the 2022 FINA World Swimming Championships (25 m) was held on 18 December 2022.

== Records ==
Prior to the competition, the existing world and championship records were as follows.

World record	Paul Biedermann (GER)	1:39.37	Berlin, Germany	15 November 2009
Competition record	Danas Rapšys (LTU)	1:40.95	Hangzhou, China	14 December 2018

The following new records were set during this competition:

Date	Event	Name	Nationality	Time	Record
18 December	Final	Hwang Sun-woo	South Korea	1:39.72	CR

== Results ==
=== Heats ===
The heats were started at 11:23.

Rank	Heat	Lane	Name	Nationality	Time	Notes
1	5	7	Tom Dean	Great Britain	1:40.98	Q
2	5	5	Katsuhiro Matsumoto	Japan	1:41.29	Q, NR
3	5	3	Maxime Grousset	France	1:41.79	Q
4	6	3	Drew Kibler	United States	1:41.88	Q
5	6	5	Danas Rapšys	Lithuania	1:42.21	Q
6	4	3	David Popovici	Romania	1:42.31	Q
7	4	6	Thomas Neill	Australia	1:42.38	Q
8	4	4	Hwang Sun-woo	South Korea	1:42.44	Q
9	4	5	Kieran Smith	United States	1:42.54	
10	5	6	Antonio Djakovic	Switzerland	1:43.04	
11	5	1	Kregor Zirk	Estonia	1:43.16	
12	6	7	Roman Fuchs	France	1:43.17	
13	6	4	Matthew Sates	South Africa	1:43.22	
14	4	1	Petar Mitsin	Bulgaria	1:43.48	NR
14	4	2	Breno Correia	Brazil	1:43.48	
14	6	2	Pan Zhanle	China	1:43.48	
17	5	2	Matteo Ciampi	Italy	1:43.51	
18	6	6	Luc Kroon	Netherlands	1:43.86	
19	4	7	Hidenari Mano	Japan	1:44.20	
20	3	4	Luis Domínguez	Spain	1:44.25	
21	6	1	Velimir Stjepanović	Serbia	1:44.73	
22	4	8	Carter Swift	New Zealand	1:44.88	
23	2	5	Ruslan Gaziev	Canada	1:44.97	
24	6	8	Josha Salchow	Germany	1:45.01	
25	5	8	Isak Eliasson	Sweden	1:45.17	
26	3	6	Ronny Brännkärr	Finland	1:45.42	
27	3	5	Joaquín Vargas	Peru	1:45.69	
28	3	1	Ksawery Masiuk	Poland	1:46.51	
29	2	4	Wesley Roberts	Cook Islands	1:46.67	NR
30	3	7	Cheuk Ming Ho	Hong Kong	1:47.30	
31	2	6	Max Mannes	Luxembourg	1:47.41	
32	2	2	Santiago Corredor	Colombia	1:47.47	
33	3	3	Jakub Poliačik	Slovakia	1:47.48	
34	3	8	Illia Linnyk	Ukraine	1:47.72	
35	3	2	Mikel Schreuders	Aruba	1:47.74	
36	2	1	Omar Abbass	Syria	1:48.73	NR
37	2	3	Luka Kukhalashvili	Georgia	1:49.38	
38	2	7	Mark Ducaj	Albania	1:50.38	
39	2	8	James Freeman	Botswana	1:51.02	NR
40	1	5	Luke Thompson	Bahamas	1:51.31	NR
41	1	4	Pavel Alovațki	Moldova	1:51.42	
42	1	6	Matt Savitz	Gibraltar	1:54.02	NR
43	1	3	Jinnosuke Suzuki	Northern Mariana Islands	1:56.27	
44	1	2	Israel Poppe	Guam	1:57.67	
45	1	7	Sangay Tenzin	Bhutan	2:03.80	
46	1	1	Ervin Shrestha	Nepal	2:05.03	
	1	8	Jeancarlo Calderon	Panama	Did not start	
	5	4	Kyle Chalmers	Australia	Did not start	

=== Final ===
The final was held at 20:50.

Rank	Lane	Name	Nationality	Time	Notes
1st place, gold medalist(s)	8	Hwang Sun-woo	South Korea	1:39.72	CR, AS
2nd place, silver medalist(s)	7	David Popovici	Romania	1:40.79	NR
3rd place, bronze medalist(s)	4	Tom Dean	Great Britain	1:40.86	
4	6	Drew Kibler	United States	1:41.44	
5	1	Thomas Neill	Australia	1:41.55	
6	3	Maxime Grousset	France	1:41.56	
7	2	Danas Rapšys	Lithuania	1:41.74	
8	5	Katsuhiro Matsumoto	Japan	1:41.91	
