= Swimming at the 2022 Asian Games – Men's 4 × 200 metre freestyle relay =

Men's 4 × 200 metre freestyle relay at the 2022 Asian Games
- Venue: Hangzhou Olympic Expo Aquatics Center
- Date: 25 September 2023
- Competitors: 59 from 13 nations

Medalists
gold medal	South Korea; Yang Jae-hoon, Lee Ho-joon, Kim Woo-min, Hwang Sun-woo, Lee Yoo-yeon, Kim Gun-woo
silver medal	China; Wang Shun, Niu Guangsheng, Wang Haoyu, Pan Zhanle, Fei Liwei, Hong Jinquan, Zhang Ziyang
bronze medal	Japan; Hidenari Mano, Tomoru Honda, Taikan Tanaka, Katsuhiro Matsumoto, So Ogata

The men's 4 × 200 metre freestyle relay event at the 2022 Asian Games took place on 25 September 2023 at the Hangzhou Olympic Expo Center.

== Schedule ==
All times are China Standard Time (UTC+08:00)

Date	Time	Event
Monday, 25 September 2023	11:21	Heats
Monday, 25 September 2023	20:54	Final

== Records ==
Prior to this competition, the existing world, Asian and Games records were as follows.

World Record	United States	6:58.55	Rome, Italy	31 July 2009
Asian Record	Japan	7:02.26	Rome, Italy	31 July 2009
Games Record	Japan	7:05.17	Jakarta, Indonesia	20 August 2018

== Results ==
Legend

- DSQ — Disqualified

=== Heats ===
Rank	Heat	Team	Time	Notes
1	2	South Korea (KOR)	7:12.84	
		Lee Yoo-yeon	1:48.24	
		Kim Gun-woo	1:49.53	
		Yang Jae-hoon	1:49.00	
		Kim Woo-min	1:46.07	
2	1	China (CHN)	7:12.96	
		Fei Liwei	1:49.36	
		Hong Jinquan	1:47.72	
		Niu Guangsheng	1:47.78	
		Zhang Ziyang	1:48.10	
3	2	Japan (JPN)	7:13.38	
		Hidenari Mano	1:46.92	
		Tomoru Honda	1:48.09	
		Taikan Tanaka	1:48.95	
		So Ogata	1:49.42	
4	1	Singapore (SGP)	7:21.57	
		Glen Lim	1:49.85	
		Ardi Zulhilmi Azman	1:49.21	
		Jerald Lium	1:50.21	
		Darren Chua	1:52.30	
5	2	Malaysia (MAS)	7:26.17	
		Khiew Hoe Yean	1:49.29	
		Arvin Shaun Singh Chahal	1:49.62	
		Lim Yin Chuen	1:52.28	
		Tan Khai Xin	1:54.98	
6	2	India (IND)	7:29.04	
		Aryan Nehra	1:52.93	
		Aneesh S. Gowda	1:52.57	
		Kushagra Rawat	1:52.41	
		Tanish George Mathew	1:51.13	
7	1	Vietnam (VIE)	7:29.99	
		Đỗ Ngọc Vinh	1:53.26	
		Ngô Đình Chuyền	1:52.10	
		Trần Hưng Nguyên	1:51.66	
		Nguyễn Quang Thuấn	1:52.97	
8	2	Hong Kong (HKG)	7:32.79	
		Cheuk Ming Ho	1:51.12	
		Lau Ping Chi	1:53.79	
		He Shing Ip	1:54.04	
		Lau Shiu Yue	1:53.84	
9	1	Thailand (THA)	7:33.79	
		Dulyawat Kaewsriyong	1:55.08	
		Pongpanod Trithan	1:53.49	
		Ratthawit Thammananthachote	1:51.70	
		Tonnam Kanteemool	1:53.52	
10	2	Qatar (QAT)	8:03.38	
		Mohamed Ismail	1:59.88	
		Tameem El-Hamayda	2:03.68	
		Abdalla El-Ghamry	1:59.92	
		Ahmed Diab	1:59.90	
11	1	Macau (MAC)	8:23.17	
		Ng Chi Hin	2:02.20	
		Lam Chi Chong	2:05.65	
		Chan Si Chon	2:07.99	
		Choi Ngou Fai	2:07.33	
12	1	Pakistan (PAK)	8:44.27	
		Muhammad Amaan Siddiqui	2:03.34	
		Azhar Abbas	2:20.41	
		Muhammad Hamza Anwar	2:17.95	
		Muhammad Ahmed Durrani	2:02.57	
13	2	Maldives (MDV)	8:50.22	
		Mubal Azzam Ibrahim	2:08.22	
		Mohamed Rihan Shiham	2:09.55	
		Ahmed Neeq Niyaz	2:22.65	
		Ali Imaan	2:09.80	

=== Final ===
Rank	Team	Time	Notes
1st place, gold medalist(s)	South Korea (KOR)	7:01.73	AR
	Yang Jae-hoon	1:46.83	
	Lee Ho-joon	1:45.36	
	Kim Woo-min	1:44.50	
	Hwang Sun-woo	1:45.04	
2nd place, silver medalist(s)	China (CHN)	7:03.40	
	Wang Shun	1:45.96	
	Niu Guangsheng	1:46.68	
	Wang Haoyu	1:45.99	
	Pan Zhanle	1:44.77	
3rd place, bronze medalist(s)	Japan (JPN)	7:06.29	
	Hidenari Mano	1:47.11	
	Tomoru Honda	1:45.59	
	Taikan Tanaka	1:48.00	
	Katsuhiro Matsumoto	1:45.59	
4	Singapore (SGP)	7:17.98	
	Glen Lim	1:49.30	
	Ardi Zulhilmi Azman	1:48.07	
	Jerald Lium	1:50.75	
	Jonathan Tan	1:49.86	
5	Malaysia (MAS)	7:22.08	
	Khiew Hoe Yean	1:49.55	
	Tan Khai Xin	1:51.63	
	Arvin Shaun Singh Chahal	1:50.54	
	Lim Yin Chuen	1:50.36	
6	Vietnam (VIE)	7:24.92	
	Trần Hưng Nguyên	1:49.73	
	Ngô Đình Chuyền	1:50.91	
	Nguyễn Quang Thuấn	1:51.73	
	Đỗ Ngọc Vinh	1:52.55	
7	India (IND)	7:29.23	
	Aryan Nehra	1:51.89	
	Aneesh S. Gowda	1:52.35	
	Kushagra Rawat	1:52.19	
	Tanish George Mathew	1:52.80	
—	Hong Kong (HKG)	DSQ	
	Cheuk Ming Ho	1:50.92	
	Lau Ping Chi	1:53.03	
	He Shing Ip		
	Lau Shiu Yue		
