= Swimming at the 2022 Asian Games – Men's 4 × 100 metre freestyle relay =

Men's 4 × 100 metre freestyle relay at the 2022 Asian Games
- Venue: Hangzhou Olympic Expo Aquatics Center
- Date: 28 September 2023
- Competitors: 66 from 14 nations

Medalists
gold medal	China; Pan Zhanle, Chen Juner, Hong Jinquan, Wang Haoyu, Wang Shun, Wang Changhao, Yang Jintong
silver medal	South Korea; Ji Yu-chan, Lee Ho-joon, Kim Ji-hun, Hwang Sun-woo, Yang Jae-hoon, Lee Yoo-yeon, Kim Young-beom≠
bronze medal	Japan; Katsumi Nakamura, Katsuhiro Matsumoto, Taikan Tanaka, Tomonobu Gomi, Shinri Shioura

The men's 4 × 100 metre freestyle relay event at the 2022 Asian Games took place on 28 September 2023 at the Hangzhou Olympic Expo Center.

== Schedule ==
All times are China Standard Time (UTC+08:00)

Date	Time	Event
Thursday, 28 September 2023	11:21	Heats
Thursday, 28 September 2023	20:48	Final

== Records ==
Prior to this competition, the existing world, Asian and Games records were as follows.

World Record	United States	3:08.24	Beijing, China	11 August 2008
Asian Record	China	3:11.38	Fukuoka, Japan	23 July 2023
Games Record	Japan	3:12.68	Jakarta, Indonesia	22 August 2018

== Results ==
=== Heats ===
Rank	Heat	Team	Time	Notes
1	1	South Korea (KOR)	3:16.96	
		Yang Jae-hoon	49.40	
		Ji Yu-chan	50.57	
		Lee Yoo-yeon	48.61	
		Kim Young-beom	48.38	
2	2	China (CHN)	3:17.17	
		Wang Shun	49.12	
		Hong Jinquan	48.70	
		Wang Changhao	49.05	
		Yang Jintong	50.30	
3	1	Singapore (SGP)	3:18.21	
		Ardi Zulhilmi Azman	50.28	
		Darren Chua	50.53	
		Quah Zheng Wen	48.17	
		Jonathan Tan	49.23	
4	2	Japan (JPN)	3:18.32	
		Taikan Tanaka	49.44	
		Tomonobu Gomi	49.28	
		Katsumi Nakamura	50.25	
		Shinri Shioura	49.35	
5	2	India (IND)	3:21.22	
		Tanish George Mathew	50.88	
		Vishal Grewal	50.97	
		Anand A. S.	50.37	
		Srihari Nataraj	49.00	
6	2	Malaysia (MAS)	3:22.50	
		Arvin Shaun Singh Chahal	50.68	
		Lim Yin Chuen	50.45	
		Bryan Leong	51.29	
		Khiew Hoe Yean	50.08	
7	1	Thailand (THA)	3:23.15	
		Dulyawat Kaewsriyong	50.34	
		Pongpanod Trithan	50.35	
		Navaphat Wongcharoen	52.31	
		Tonnam Kanteemool	50.15	
8	1	Hong Kong (HKG)	3:23.35	
		Cheuk Ming Ho	51.12	
		Ian Ho	49.48	
		Lau Ping Chi	51.55	
		Ng Cheuk Yin	51.20	
9	2	Vietnam (VIE)	3:27.18	
		Ngô Đình Chuyền	51.53	
		Nguyễn Quang Thuấn	52.44	
		Đỗ Ngọc Vinh	51.93	
		Trần Hưng Nguyên	51.28	
10	2	Qatar (QAT)	3:38.14	
		Tameem El-Hamayda	52.82	
		Abdulla Al-Khaldi	56.49	
		Abdalla El-Ghamry	54.49	
		Ahmed Diab	54.34	
11	1	Macau (MAC)	3:38.90	
		Ng Chi Hin	52.98	
		Choi Ngou Fai	54.37	
		Chan Si Chon	56.31	
		Lam Chi Chong	55.24	
12	2	Mongolia (MGL)	3:39.31	
		Batbayaryn Enkhtamir	52.08	
		Rentsendorjiin Tamir	55.30	
		Khash-Erdeniin Tselmeg	55.54	
		Sodovjamtsyn Sodmandakh	56.39	
13	1	Pakistan (PAK)	3:50.13	
		Muhammad Amaan Siddiqui	53.97	
		Muhammad Ahmed Durrani	54.11	
		Muhammad Hamza Anwar	59.69	
		Azhar Abbas	1:02.36	
14	1	Maldives (MDV)	3:57.16	
		Mubal Azzam Ibrahim	57.90	
		Mohamed Rihan Shiham	58.71	
		Ahmed Neeq Niyaz	1:03.04	
		Ali Imaan	57.51	

=== Final ===
Rank	Team	Time	Notes
1st place, gold medalist(s)	China (CHN)	3:10.88	AR
	Pan Zhanle	47.06	
	Chen Juner	48.00	
	Hong Jinquan	48.27	
	Wang Haoyu	47.55	
2nd place, silver medalist(s)	South Korea (KOR)	3:12.96	
	Ji Yu-chan	48.90	
	Lee Ho-joon	47.79	
	Kim Ji-hun	48.66	
	Hwang Sun-woo	47.61	
3rd place, bronze medalist(s)	Japan (JPN)	3:14.26	
	Katsumi Nakamura	48.75	
	Katsuhiro Matsumoto	47.97	
	Taikan Tanaka	48.82	
	Tomonobu Gomi	48.72	
4	Singapore (SGP)	3:14.77	
	Jonathan Tan	49.13	
	Quah Zheng Wen	48.31	
	Ardi Zulhilmi Azman	50.08	
	Mikkel Lee	47.25	
5	Hong Kong (HKG)	3:21.26	
	Cheuk Ming Ho	50.62	
	Ian Ho	49.22	
	Lau Ping Chi	50.40	
	Ng Cheuk Yin	51.02	
6	India (IND)	3:21.46	
	Srihari Nataraj	50.00	
	Anand A. S.	50.73	
	Vishal Grewal	50.76	
	Tanish George Mathew	49.97	
7	Thailand (THA)	3:22.24	
	Dulyawat Kaewsriyong	50.19	
	Pongpanod Trithan	50.26	
	Ratthawit Thammananthachote	51.78	
	Tonnam Kanteemool	50.01	
8	Malaysia (MAS)	3:24.78	
	Arvin Shaun Singh Chahal	50.44	
	Tan Khai Xin	51.54	
	Bryan Leong	52.07	
	Lim Yin Chuen	50.73	
