= Swimming at the 2022 Asian Games – Men's 200 metre freestyle =

Men's 200 metre freestyle at the 2022 Asian Games
- Venue: Hangzhou Olympic Expo Aquatics Center
- Date: 27 September 2023
- Competitors: 36 from 24 nations

Medalists
gold medal	Hwang Sun-woo	South Korea
silver medal	Pan Zhanle	China
bronze medal	Lee Ho-joon	South Korea

The men's 200 metre freestyle event at the 2022 Asian Games took place on 27 September 2023 at the Hangzhou Olympic Expo Center.

== Schedule ==
All times are China Standard Time (UTC+08:00)

Date	Time	Event
Wednesday, 27 September 2023	10:42	Heats
Wednesday, 27 September 2023	19:48	Final

== Records ==
Prior to this competition, the existing world, Asian and Games records were as follows.

World Record	Paul Biedermann (GER)	1:42.00	Rome, Italy	28 July 2009
Asian Record	Sun Yang (CHN)	1:44.39	Budapest, Hungary	25 July 2017
Games Record	Park Tae-hwan (KOR)	1:44.80	Guangzhou, China	14 November 2010

== Results ==
=== Heats ===
Rank	Heat	Athlete	Time	Notes
1	3	Hwang Sun-woo (KOR)	1:47.08	
2	3	Hidenari Mano (JPN)	1:47.79	
3	5	Lee Ho-joon (KOR)	1:48.13	
4	4	Pan Zhanle (CHN)	1:48.42	
5	5	Katsuhiro Matsumoto (JPN)	1:48.44	
6	4	Hong Jinquan (CHN)	1:48.46	
7	3	Glen Lim (SGP)	1:48.76	
8	4	Ardi Zulhilmi Azman (SGP)	1:48.86	
9	4	Khiew Hoe Yean (MAS)	1:48.97	
10	3	Srihari Nataraj (IND)	1:49.05	
11	5	Lim Yin Chuen (MAS)	1:51.18	
12	5	Cheuk Ming Ho (HKG)	1:51.40	
13	4	Tonnam Kanteemool (THA)	1:51.42	
14	4	Ngô Đình Chuyền (VIE)	1:51.74	
15	5	Karel Subagyo (INA)	1:51.99	
15	5	Dulyawat Kaewsriyong (THA)	1:51.99	
17	2	Egor Petryakov (UZB)	1:52.00	
18	3	Đỗ Ngọc Vinh (VIE)	1:52.29	
19	4	Tanish George Mathew (IND)	1:52.39	
20	3	Matin Sohran (IRI)	1:53.57	
21	5	Sauod Al-Shamroukh (KUW)	1:54.21	
22	4	Batbayaryn Enkhtamir (MGL)	1:54.38	
23	3	He Shing Ip (HKG)	1:55.12	
24	3	Issa Al-Adawi (OMA)	1:56.52	
25	2	Musa Jalaýew (TKM)	1:56.78	
26	1	Mahmoud Abugharbia (PLE)	1:58.40	
27	2	Ng Chi Hin (MAC)	1:59.07	
28	2	Ahmed Diab (QAT)	1:59.09	
29	2	Muhammad Ahmed Durrani (PAK)	1:59.29	
30	5	Abdalla El-Ghamry (QAT)	1:59.38	
31	2	Muhammad Amaan Siddiqui (PAK)	1:59.77	
32	2	Nasir Yahya Hussain (NEP)	2:00.14	
33	1	Ardasher Gadoev (TJK)	2:02.84	
34	1	Enkhbaataryn Ninjin (MGL)	2:03.29	
35	1	Sangay Tenzin (BHU)	2:07.61	
36	2	Mubal Azzam Ibrahim (MDV)	2:08.33	

=== Final ===
Rank	Athlete	Time	Notes
1st place, gold medalist(s)	Hwang Sun-woo (KOR)	1:44.40	GR
2nd place, silver medalist(s)	Pan Zhanle (CHN)	1:45.28	
3rd place, bronze medalist(s)	Lee Ho-joon (KOR)	1:45.56	
4	Hidenari Mano (JPN)	1:46.15	
5	Hong Jinquan (CHN)	1:47.70	
6	Katsuhiro Matsumoto (JPN)	1:48.95	
7	Glen Lim (SGP)	1:49.00	
8	Ardi Zulhilmi Azman (SGP)	1:49.22	
