= Shooting at the 2022 Asian Games – Men's 10 metre running target team =

Men's 10 metre running target team at the 2022 Asian Games
- Venue: Fuyang Yinhu Sports Centre
- Dates: 25 September 2023
- Competitors: 15 from 5 nations

Medalists
gold medal	South Korea; Ha Kwang-chul, Jeong You-jin, Kwak Yong-bin
silver medal	North Korea; Kwon Kwang-il, Pak Myong-won, Yu Song-jun
bronze medal	Indonesia; Muhammad Badri Akbar, Irfandi Julio, Muhammad Sejahtera Dwi Putra

The men's 10 metre running target team competition at the 2022 Asian Games in Hangzhou, China was held on 25 September 2023 at Fuyang Yinhu Sports Centre.

== Schedule ==
All times are China Standard Time (UTC+08:00)

Date	Time	Event
Monday, 25 September 2023	09:00	Final

== Records ==
Prior to this competition, the existing world, Asian and Games records were as follows.

World Record	Russia	1739	Maribor, Slovenia	10 March 2017
Asian Record	China	1734	Kuala Lumpur, Malaysia	16 February 2004
Games Record	China	1720	Busan, South Korea	4 October 2002

== Results ==
Rank	Team	Slow			Fast			Total	Xs	Notes
Rank	Team	1	2	3	1	2	3	Total	Xs	Notes
1st place, gold medalist(s)	South Korea (KOR)	285	282	283	264	275	279	1668	39	
	Ha Kwang-chul	95	93	92	87	89	93	549	11	
	Jeong You-jin	95	92	96	92	96	94	565	14	
	Kwak Yong-bin	95	97	95	85	90	92	554	14	
2nd place, silver medalist(s)	North Korea (PRK)	282	291	282	270	270	273	1668	29	
	Kwon Kwang-il	96	97	91	91	92	92	559	12	
	Pak Myong-won	93	98	96	88	92	94	561	11	
	Yu Song-jun	93	96	95	91	86	87	548	6	
3rd place, bronze medalist(s)	Indonesia (INA)	289	286	278	266	273	275	1667	33	
	Muhammad Badri Akbar	95	96	93	83	87	92	546	7	
	Irfandi Julio	95	93	90	88	92	85	543	11	
	Muhammad Sejahtera Dwi Putra	99	97	95	95	94	98	578	15	
4	Vietnam (VIE)	291	273	279	268	271	285	1667	28	
	Ngô Hữu Vượng	98	91	96	94	93	99	571	10	
	Nguyễn Công Dậu	95	88	88	82	89	89	531	6	
	Nguyễn Tuấn Anh	98	94	95	92	89	97	565	12	
5	Kazakhstan (KAZ)	280	279	283	270	275	277	1664	31	
	Bakhtiyar Ibrayev	93	90	94	91	88	93	549	12	
	Andrey Khudyakov	91	97	97	91	92	93	561	7	
	Assadbek Nazirkulyev	96	92	92	88	95	91	554	12	
