= Yang Jae-hoon =

South Korean swimmer (born 1998)

Personal information
- Nationality: South Korean
- Born: 7 May 1998 (age 28)

Sport
- Country: South Korea
- Sport: Swimming
- Event: Freestyle relay
Medal record
Men's swimming
Representing South Korea
World Championships
Silver medal – second place	2024 Doha	4×200 m freestyle
Asian Games
Gold medal – first place	2022 Hangzhou	4 x 200 m freestyle
Silver medal – second place	2022 Hangzhou	4 x 100 m freestyle
Silver medal – second place	2026 Aichi–Nagoya	4×100 m freestyle
Bronze medal – third place	2026 Aichi–Nagoya	4×100 m medley
Bronze medal – third place	2026 Aichi–Nagoya	4×200 m freestyle

Yang Jae-hoon (born 7 May 1998) is a South Korean swimmer.

== Career ==
At the Swimming at the 2023 World Aquatics Championships he was part of the South Korean Men's 4 × 200 metre freestyle relay team that set a new national record time.

He won a gold medal at the delayed 2022 Asian Games in Hangzhou in the 4 × 200 metre freestyle relay, in an Asian record time.

In October 2023, he lowered the South Korean 100m butterfly national record to 51.85 seconds.

He won a silver medal at the 2024 World Aquatics Championships in the Men's 4 × 200 metre freestyle relay.

He competed at the 2024 Summer Olympics as was part of the South Korean team that reached the Men's 4 × 200 metre freestyle relay final.
