= Hwang Sun-woo =

South Korean swimmer (born 2003)

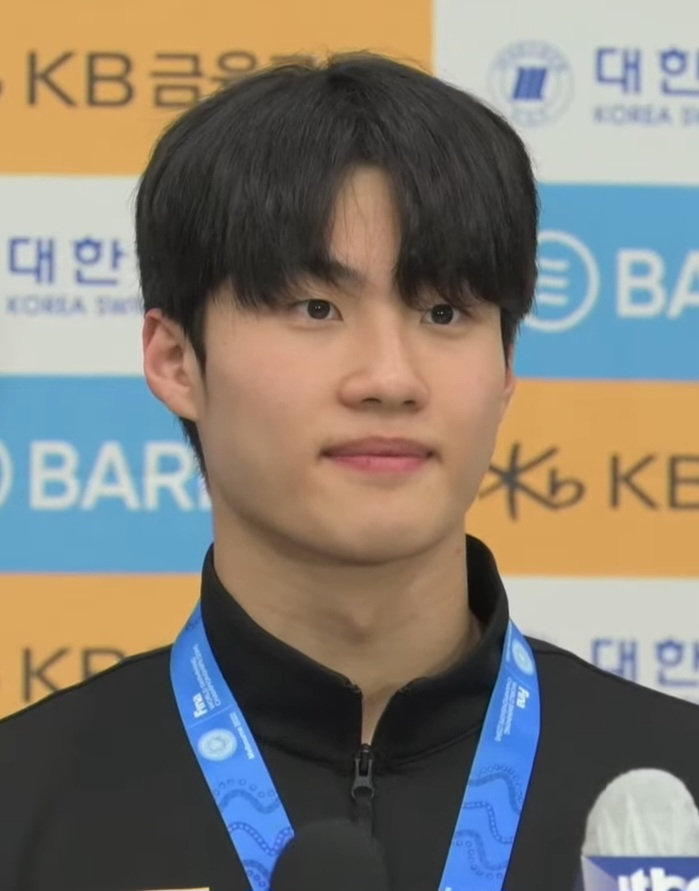

Personal information
- Nationality: South Korean
- Born: 21 May 2003 (age 23) Suwon, South Korea
- Height: 1.87 m (6 ft 2 in)
- Weight: 76 kg (168 lb)

Sport
- Sport: Swimming
- Strokes: Freestyle
Medal record
Men's swimming
Representing South Korea
World Championships (LC)
Gold medal – first place	2024 Doha	200 m freestyle
Silver medal – second place	2022 Budapest	200 m freestyle
Silver medal – second place	2024 Doha	4×200 m freestyle
Bronze medal – third place	2023 Fukuoka	200 m freestyle
World Championships (SC)
Gold medal – first place	2021 Abu Dhabi	200 m freestyle
Gold medal – first place	2022 Melbourne	200 m freestyle
Asian Games
Gold medal – first place	2022 Hangzhou	200 m freestyle
Gold medal – first place	2022 Hangzhou	4x200 m freestyle
Silver medal – second place	2022 Hangzhou	4×100 m medley
Silver medal – second place	2022 Hangzhou	4 × 100 m freestyle
Silver medal – second place	2026 Aichi–Nagoya	200 m freestyle
Silver medal – second place	2026 Aichi–Nagoya	4×100 m freestyle
Bronze medal – third place	2022 Hangzhou	4×100 m mixed medley
Bronze medal – third place	2022 Hangzhou	100 m freestyle
Bronze medal – third place	2026 Aichi–Nagoya	100 m freestyle
Bronze medal – third place	2026 Aichi–Nagoya	4×100 m medley
Bronze medal – third place	2026 Aichi–Nagoya	4×100 m mixed medley
Bronze medal – third place	2026 Aichi–Nagoya	4×200 m freestyle

Korean name
- Hangul: 황선우
- RR: Hwang Seonu
- MR: Hwang Sŏnu

Hwang Sun-woo (Korean: 황선우; born 21 May 2003) is a South Korean swimmer. He is the 2024 World Champion in the men's 200m freestyle and won 6 medals in the 2022 Hangzhou Asian Games.

== Career ==
=== 2021 ===
In April 2021, Hwang competed at the Korean trials. He set a new South Korean record in the 100 m freestyle with a time of 48.04. He then broke the world junior record in the 200 m freestyle with a time of 1:44.96.

In July 2021, at the Tokyo Olympics, Hwang was the flagbearer for South Korea together with volleyballer Kim Yeon-koung. In the 200 m freestyle, Hwang went 1:44.62 in the heats and qualified fastest for the semifinals. His time lowered his own world junior record, and broke Park Tae-hwan's national record of 1:44.80 from 2010. In the final, Hwang finished seventh in a time of 1:45.26. In the 100 m freestyle, he went 47.56 in the semifinals, breaking the Asian record of 47.65 set by China's Ning Zetao in 2014. Hwang later placed fifth in the final with a time of 47.82.

At the 2021 World Championships (25 m) in Abu Dhabi, Hwang won the 200 m freestyle in 1:41.60.

=== 2022 ===
At the 2022 World Championships in Budapest, Hwang won the silver medal in the 200 m freestyle in a national record time of 1:44.47. In the 100 m freestyle, he came eleventh with a time of 48.08.

At the 2022 World Championships (25 m) in Melbourne, Hwang swam in the 4 × 200 m freestyle relay. He split 1:40.99 on the first leg, breaking Park's Asian record of 1:41.03 from 2016. The relay finished fourth in a time of 6:49.67. In the 200 m freestyle, he won the gold medal in a time of 1:39.72, lowering the Asian record again, and breaking the championship record of 1:40.95 set by Lithuanian Danas Rapšys in 2018.

=== 2023 ===
In July 2023, Hwang competed at the 2023 World Championships in Fukuoka. He won the bronze medal in the 200 m freestyle, lowering his national record to 1:44.42. He then finished ninth in the 100 m freestyle in a time of 48.08.

In September 2023, Hwang competed at the Asian Games in Hangzhou. He won the bronze medal in the 100 m freestyle in a time of 48.04. The following day, he swam in the men's 4 × 200 m freestyle relay. South Korea won the gold medal in a time of 7:01.73, breaking the Asian record of 7:02.26 set by Japan in 2009. On day three, he swam in the men's 4 × 100 m medley relay, winning the silver medal in a national record time of 3:32.05. Hwang then won the gold medal in the 200 m freestyle in a time of 1:44.40, breaking the South Korean and games records in the event. Later in the session, he swam in the mixed 4 × 100 m medley relay, winning the bronze medal in 3:46.78 to set another national record. The following day, he concluded the competition with the 4 × 100 m freestyle relay, where South Korea won the silver medal in a national record time of 3:12.96.

=== 2024 ===
In February 2024, at the 2024 World Championships in Doha, Hwang won the gold medal in the 200 m freestyle in a time of 1:44.75. He then swam the 4 × 200 m freestyle relay. The race was led by China and the US, but Hwang put South Korea in gold medal contention on the anchor leg. He split 1:43.76 and overtook the US, but finished 0.10 seconds behind China; South Korea won the silver medal in 7:01.94.

In July 2024, Hwang competed at the 2024 Olympics in Paris. He finished ninth in the 200 m freestyle and missed the final; his time of 1:45.92 was 0.04 seconds slower than the eighth qualifier. He swam in the 4 × 200 m freestyle relay, splitting 1:45.99 on the anchor leg to contribute to a seventh place finish; South Korea's overall time was 7:07.26.

=== 2025 ===
At the 2025 World Championships in Singapore, Hwang came fourth in the 200 m freestyle in a time of 1:44.72. He finished thirteenth in the 100 m freestyle in a time of 47.94.

In October 2025, at the National Sports Festival in Busan, Hwang went 1:43.92 in the 200 m freestyle, breaking the Asian record of 1:44.39 set by China's Sun Yang in 2017.

== Personal best times ==
Long course (50 metre pool)
Event	Time	Meet	Date	Note (s)
50 m freestyle	22.39	Korean National Trials	16 May 2021	
100 m freestyle	47.56	Olympic Games	28 July 2021	^{[a]}
200 m freestyle	1:43.92	Korean National Sports Festival	20 September 2025	AS

Short course (25 metre pool)
Event	Time	Meet	Date	Note (s)
50m freestyle	21.72	World Championships	19 December 2021	^{[b]}
100m freestyle	46.34	World Championships	21 December 2021	NR
200m freestyle	1:39.72	World Championships	18 December 2022	AS
100m individual medley	52.13	World Championships	18 December 2021	^{[b]}

Legend: AS – Asian record; NR – South Korean record;

^{a} Former Asian record
^{b} Former South Korean record

== Honours ==
- 19th Korea Image Awards (2023) – Korea Image Budding Youth Award
