= Lee Yoo-yeon =

South Korean swimmer (born 2000)

Personal information
- Nationality: South Korean
- Born: September 4, 2000 (age 25) Anyang, South Korea

Sport
- Country: South Korea
- Sport: Swimming
- Event: Freestyle
Medal record
World Championships (LC)
Silver medal – second place	2024 Doha	4×200 m freestyle
Asian Games
Gold medal – first place	2022 Hangzhou	4×200 m freestyle
Silver medal – second place	2022 Hangzhou	4x100 m freestyle

Korean name
- Hangul: 이유연
- RR: I Yuyeon
- MR: I Yuyŏn

Lee Yoo-yeon (Korean: 이유연; born September 4, 2000) is a South Korean swimmer specialized in freestyle.

== Career ==
In October 2018, he represented South Korea at the 2018 Summer Youth Olympics held in Buenos Aires, Argentina. He competed in 50m freestyle, 100m freestyle, 200m freestyle and mixed 4 × 100m freestyle relay events. In the 50m freestyle heats event, he completed at rank 9, allowing him to advance to compete in the semifinal. In the 50m freestyle semifinal event, he completed at rank 8 with Robin Hanson. In semifinal swim-off against Robin, he completed at rank 2 hence did not advance to compete in the final. In the 100m freestyle heats event, he completed at rank 1, allowing him to advance to compete in the semifinal. In the 100m freestyle semifinal event, he completed at rank 3, allowing him to compete in the final which he completed at rank 5. In the 200m freestyle heats event, he completed at rank 7, allowing him to compete in the final which he completed at rank 8. In the freestyle relay event, the team did not advance to compete in the final.

In July 2019, he represented South Korea at the 2019 Summer Universiade held in Naples, Italy. He competed in the 50m freestyle, 100m freestyle, 200m freestyle, 400m freestyle, 4 × 100m freestyle relay, 4 × 200m freestyle relay and 4 × 100m medley relay at the . In the same month, he represented South Korea at the 2019 World Aquatics Championships. He competed in 4 × 200m freestyle relay, the team did not advance to compete in the final and qualify for the 2020 Summer Olympics which are awarded to top 12 teams in the standings.

In July 2021, he represented South Korea at the 2020 Summer Olympics held in Tokyo, Japan. He competed in 4 × 200m freestyle relay event. The team did not advance to compete in the final.
