= Jeong You-jin =

South Korean sport shooter (born 1983)

Personal information
- Nationality: South Korean
- Born: 18 December 1983 (age 42) North Chungcheong Province, South Korea
- Height: 1.84 m (6 ft 0 in)
- Weight: 73 kg (161 lb)

Sport
- Country: South Korea
- Sport: Shooting
- Event: Running target shooting
Medal record
World Championships
Bronze medal – third place	2018 Changwon	50 m running target team
Bronze medal – third place	2023 Baku	10 m running target
Bronze medal – third place	2023 Baku	10 m running target mixed team
Asian Games
Gold medal – first place	2022 Hangzhou	10 m running target team
Gold medal – first place	2022 Hangzhou	10 m running target mixed team
Bronze medal – third place	2022 Hangzhou	10 m running target
Bronze medal – third place	2022 Hangzhou	10 m running target mixed run
Asian Championships
Silver medal – second place	2023 Changwon	10 m running target mixed

Korean name
- Hangul: 정유진
- RR: Jeong Yujin
- MR: Chŏng Yujin

Jeong You-jin (born 18 December 1983) is a South Korean sport shooter.

He participated at the 2018 ISSF World Shooting Championships, winning a medal.
