= Kwon Kwang-il =

North Korean sport shooter (born 1990)

Personal information
- Nationality: North Korean
- Born: 9 May 1990 (age 36)
- Height: 1.75 m (5 ft 9 in)
- Weight: 78 kg (172 lb)

Sport
- Country: North Korea
- Sport: Shooting
- Event: Running target shooting
Medal record
World Championships
Silver medal – second place	2018 Changwon	10 m team running target
Bronze medal – third place	2018 Changwon	10 m team running target mixed
Bronze medal – third place	2018 Changwon	50 m team running target mixed
Asian Games
Silver medal – second place	2022 Hangzhou	10 m running target team
Silver medal – second place	2022 Hangzhou	10 m running target mixed
Asian Championships
Gold medal – first place	2019 Doha	10 m running target team
Gold medal – first place	2019 Doha	10 m running target mixed team
Silver medal – second place	2019 Doha	10 m running target mixed

Kwon Kwang-il (born 9 May 1990) is a North Korean sport shooter.

He participated at the 2018 ISSF World Shooting Championships, winning a medal.
