= Kim Min-gyu (judoka) =

South Korean judoka (born 1982)

Medal record

Representing South Korea

Men's Judo

World Team Championships Cairo
Gold medal – first place	2005 Cairo, Egypt	Team

East Asian Judo Championships
Gold medal – first place	2006 Ulan Bator	–‍81 kg

Men's kurash

Asian Games
Silver medal – second place	2022 Hangzhou	–‍90 kg

- Korean name
- Hangul: 김민규
- Hanja: 金旼奎
- RR: Gim Mingyu
- MR: Kim Min'gyu

Kim Min-gyu (born May 14, 1982 in South Korea) is a male South Korean judoka who competed in the half-middleweight category.

He participated in 2005 World Judo Championships, but ended at fifth.
