= Ha Kwang-chul =

South Korean sport shooter (born 1990)

Personal information
- Nationality: South Korean
- Born: 27 March 1990 (age 36)

Sport
- Country: South Korea
- Sport: Shooting
- Event: Running target shooting
Medal record
World Championships
Bronze medal – third place	2018 Changwon	50 m team running target
Bronze medal – third place	2023 Baku	10 m running target mixed team
Asian Games
Gold medal – first place	2022 Hangzhou	10 m running target team
Gold medal – first place	2022 Hangzhou	10 m running target mixed team
Asian Championships
Bronze medal – third place	2023 Changwon	10 m running target mixed

Ha Kwang-chul (born 27 March 1990) is a South Korean sport shooter. He won the gold medals in the 10 m running target team and mixed team at the 2022 Asian Games.

He participated at the 2018 ISSF World Shooting Championships, winning a medal.
