= 2021 World Athletics U20 Championships – Men's 5000 metres =

Men's 5000 metres at the 2021 World Athletics U20 Championships
- Venue: Kasarani Stadium
- Dates: 19 August
- Competitors: 10 from 6 nations
- Winning time: 13:20.37

Medalists
gold medal	Benson Kiplangat	Kenya
silver medal	Tadese Worku	Ethiopia
bronze medal	Levy Kibet	Kenya

The men's 5000 metres at the 2021 World Athletics U20 Championships was held at the Kasarani Stadium on 19 August.

== Records ==
Standing records prior to the 2021 World Athletics U20 Championships
World U20 Record	Selemon Barega (ETH)	12:43.02	Brussels, Belgium	31 August 2018
Championship Record	Abreham Cherkos (ETH)	13:08.57	Bydgoszcz, Poland	13 July 2008
World U20 Leading	Addisu Yihune (ETH)	12:58.99	Hengelo, Netherlands	8 June 2021

== Results ==
The final was held on 19 August at 17:10.

Rank	Name	Nationality	Time	Note
1st place, gold medalist(s)	Benson Kiplangat	Kenya	13:20.37	PB
2nd place, silver medalist(s)	Tadese Worku	Ethiopia	13:20.65	
3rd place, bronze medalist(s)	Levy Kibet	Kenya	13:26.01	PB
4	Addisu Yihune	Ethiopia	13:32.76	
5	Merhawi Mebrahtu	Eritrea	13:40.63	PB
6	Habtom Samuel	Eritrea	13:45.65	
7	Rodgers Kibet	Uganda	13:57.97	
8	Ajan Jacob Chol	South Sudan	14:14.37	
9	Martin Magengo Kiprotich	Uganda	14:15.62	
10	Jean Marie Bukuru	Burundi	14:28.55	
