= 2021 World Athletics U20 Championships – Women's 100 metres =

Women's 100 metres at the 2021 World Athletics U20 Championships
- Venue: Kasarani Stadium
- Dates: 18 August (heats and semifinals); 19 August (final)
- Competitors: 36 from 27 nations
- Winning time: 11.09

Medalists
gold medal	Tina Clayton	Jamaica
silver medal	Beatrice Masilingi	Namibia
bronze medal	Mélissa Gutschmidt	Switzerland

The women's 100 metres at the 2021 World Athletics U20 Championships was held at the Kasarani Stadium on 18 and 19 August.

== Records ==
Standing records prior to the 2021 World Athletics U20 Championships
World U20 Record	Marlies Göhr (GDR)	10.88	Dresden, East Germany	1 July 1977
Championship Record	Twanisha Terry (USA)	11.03	Tampere Finland	12 July 2018
World U20 Leading	Briana Williams (JAM)	10.97	Miramar, United States	5 June 2021

== Results ==
=== Heats ===
Qualification: First 4 of each heat (Q) and the 4 fastest times (q) qualified for the semifinal.

Wind:
Heat 1: +0.5 m/s, Heat 2: +0.5 m/s, Heat 3: +1.0 m/s, Heat 4: -0.1 m/s, Heat 5: -0.9 m/s

Rank	Heat	Name	Nationality	Time	Note
1	3	Beatrice Masilingi	Namibia	11.20	Q, NU20R, NR
2	4	Tina Clayton	Jamaica	11.50	Q
3	1	Camille Rutherford	Bahamas	11.59	Q
4	3	Tima Seikeseye Godbless	Nigeria	11.59	Q
5	2	Praise Ofoku	Nigeria	11.65	Q
6	2	Kerrica Hill	Jamaica	11.65	Q
7	1	Maria Mihalache	Romania	11.71	Q
8	5	Ivana Ilić	Serbia	11.75	Q
8	4	Eva Kubíčková	Czech Republic	11.75	Q, SB
10	1	Liranyi Alonso	Dominican Republic	11.75	Q
11	4	Viktória Forster	Slovakia	11.75	Q
12	3	Mélissa Gutschmidt	Switzerland	11.80	Q
13	2	Johanna Kylmänen	Finland	11.80	Q
14	3	Charlize Eilerd	South Africa	11.84	Q
15	3	Anna Pursiainen	Finland	11.85	q
16	4	Gaya Bertello	Italy	11.86	Q
16	2	Mariandreé Chacón	Guatemala	11.86	Q
18	1	Andrė Ožechauskaitė	Lithuania	11.88	Q
19	5	Leah Bertrand	Trinidad and Tobago	11.88	Q
20	4	Isabella Goudros	Canada	11.91	q
21	5	Lucie Mičunková	Czech Republic	11.93	Q
22	5	Magdalena Niemczyk	Poland	11.98	Q
23	2	Monika Romaszko	Poland	12.00	q
24	4	Medhani Batuwanage	Sri Lanka	12.01	q
25	1	Kayla La Grange	South Africa	12.02	
26	2	Simay Özçiftçi	Turkey	12.04	
27	3	Yanina Yurchenko	Ukraine	12.05	
28	5	Nemata Nikiema	Burkina Faso	12.10	
29	1	Zülha Armutçu	Turkey	12.14	
30	5	Antonella Todisco	Italy	12.15	
31	1	Boitshepiso Kelapile	Botswana	12.16	SB
32	2	Mayssa Mouawad	Lebanon	12.19	PB
33	4	Lacarthea Cooper	Bahamas	12.30	
34	3	Mercy Chebet	Kenya	12.39	PB
35	5	Charlotte Afriat	Monaco	12.66	
36	3	Sumaya Dewan	Bangladesh	12.91	PB

=== Semifinals ===
Qualification: First 2 of each heat (Q) and the 2 fastest times (q) qualified for the final.

Wind:
Heat 1: 0.0 m/s, Heat 2: +0.3 m/s, Heat 3: -0.5 m/s

Rank	Heat	Name	Nationality	Time	Note
1	1	Tina Clayton	Jamaica	11.34	Q
2	2	Beatrice Masilingi	Namibia	11.35	Q
3	2	Mélissa Gutschmidt	Switzerland	11.50	Q
4	1	Ivana Ilić	Serbia	11.50	Q
5	2	Viktória Forster	Slovakia	11.54	q, NU20R
6	3	Praise Ofoku	Nigeria	11.57	Q
7	2	Kerrica Hill	Jamaica	11.60	q
8	2	Tima Seikeseye Godbless	Nigeria	11.61	
9	3	Eva Kubíčková	Czech Republic	11.64	Q, SB
10	1	Maria Mihalache	Romania	11.64	
11	1	Johanna Kylmänen	Finland	11.70	
12	3	Camille Rutherford	Bahamas	11.72	
13	1	Liranyi Alonso	Dominican Republic	11.73	
14	2	Andrė Ožechauskaitė	Lithuania	11.79	
15	3	Leah Bertrand	Trinidad and Tobago	11.80	
16	3	Isabella Goudros	Canada	11.87	
17	2	Gaya Bertello	Italy	11.88	
18	1	Lucie Mičunková	Czech Republic	11.90	
19	3	Anna Pursiainen	Finland	11.90	
20	2	Monika Romaszko	Poland	11.91	
21	1	Medhani Batuwanage	Sri Lanka	11.96	
22	3	Charlize Eilerd	South Africa	11.97	
23	3	Mariandreé Chacón	Guatemala	11.99	
24	1	Magdalena Niemczyk	Poland	12.10	

=== Final ===
The final was held on 19 August at 18:10.

Wind: -0.6 m/s

Rank	Lane	Name	Nationality	Time	Note
1st place, gold medalist(s)	5	Tina Clayton	Jamaica	11.09	PB
2nd place, silver medalist(s)	4	Beatrice Masilingi	Namibia	11.39	
3rd place, bronze medalist(s)	7	Mélissa Gutschmidt	Switzerland	11.51	
4	6	Praise Ofoku	Nigeria	11.53	
5	9	Ivana Ilić	Serbia	11.54(.533)	
6	2	Viktória Forster	Slovakia	11.54(.537)	NU20R
7	3	Kerrica Hill	Jamaica	11.67	
8	8	Eva Kubíčková	Czech Republic	11.76	
