= 2021 World Athletics U20 Championships – Women's 200 metres =

Women's 200 metres at the 2021 World Athletics U20 Championships
- Venue: Kasarani Stadium
- Dates: 20 August (heats and semifinals); 21 August (final)
- Competitors: 32 from 24 nations
- Winning time: 21.84

Medalists
gold medal	Christine Mboma	Namibia
silver medal	Beatrice Masilingi	Namibia
bronze medal	Favour Ofili	Nigeria

The women's 200 metres at the 2021 World Athletics U20 Championships was held at the Kasarani Stadium on 20 and 21 August.

== Records ==
Standing records prior to the 2021 World Athletics U20 Championships
World U20 Record	Allyson Felix (USA)	22.18	Athens, Greece	25 August 2004
Championship Record	Briana Williams (JAM)	22.50	Tampere Finland	14 July 2018
World U20 Leading	Christine Mboma (NAM)	21.81	Tokyo, Japan	3 August 2021

== Results ==
=== Heats ===
Qualification: First 4 of each heat (Q) and the 4 fastest times (q) qualified for the semifinals.

Wind:
Heat 1: +0.2 m/s, Heat 2: +0.2 m/s, Heat 3: -0.1 m/s, Heat 4: +0.4 m/s, Heat 5: +0.1 m/s

Rank	Heat	Name	Nationality	Time	Note
1	2	Beatrice Masilingi	Namibia	22.65	Q
2	5	Favour Ofili	Nigeria	22.74	Q
3	4	Brianna Lyston	Jamaica	23.18	Q, PB
4	1	Christine Mboma	Namibia	23.23	Q
5	5	Lucia Carrillo	Spain	23.62	Q
6	4	Camille Rutherford	Bahamas	23.62	Q
7	2	Ivana Ilić	Serbia	23.71	Q
8	3	Viwe Jingqi	South Africa	23.84	Q, PB
9	4	Polyniki Emmanouilidou	Greece	23.87	Q
10	1	Barbora Šplechtnová	Czech Republic	23.92	Q
11	3	Isabella Goudros	Canada	23.95	Q
12	2	Marta Zimna	Poland	23.95	Q
13	3	Anita Taviore	Nigeria	23.97	Q
14	1	Maria Mihalache	Romania	23.98	Q
15	4	Alessandra Iezzi	Italy	23.99	Q
16	2	Medhani Batuwanage	Sri Lanka	24.01	Q, PB
17	5	Aalliyah Francis	Jamaica	24.06	Q
18	5	Elisa Visentin	Italy	24.14	Q
19	2	Tereza Lamačová	Czech Republic	24.23	q
20	1	Kayla la Grange	South Africa	24.31	Q
21	3	Lukrecija Sabaitytė	Lithuania	24.35	Q
22	3	Simay Özçiftçi	Turkey	24.36	q
23	4	Erica Barbosa	Brazil	24.37	q
24	1	Mariandré Chacón	Guatemala	24.42	q
25	1	Edmary Alma	Puerto Rico	24.56	PB
26	3	Sofia Provotorova	Authorised Neutral Athletes	24.72	
27	5	Maram Mahmoud Ahmed	Egypt	24.78	
28	4	Zülha Armutçu	Turkey	25.15	
29	1	Loice Nyanchoka Morara	Kenya	25.17	PB
30	5	Emmaculate Napeyok	ART	29.50	PB
	5	Lacarthea Cooper	Bahamas	DQ	TR17.3.1
	2	Samukeliso Ndebele	Zimbabwe	DQ	TR17.3.1
	2	Viktória Forster	Slovakia	DNS	

=== Semifinals ===
Qualification: First 2 of each heat (Q) and the 2 fastest times (q) qualified for the final.

Wind:
Heat 1: +0.9 m/s, Heat 2: +1.3 m/s, Heat 3: -0.1 m/s

Rank	Heat	Name	Nationality	Time	Note
1	2	Beatrice Masilingi	Namibia	22.19	Q, CR
2	3	Favour Ofili	Nigeria	22.37	Q
3	1	Christine Mboma	Namibia	22.41	Q, CR
4	1	Brianna Lyston	Jamaica	23.18	Q, PB
5	2	Lucia Carrillo	Spain	23.32	Q, PB
6	2	Marta Zimna	Poland	23.57	q, PB
7	1	Barbora Šplechtnová	Czech Republic	23.64	q, PB
8	3	Aalliyah Francis	Jamaica	23.70	Q, PB
9	2	Camille Rutherford	Bahamas	23.76	
10	3	Polyniki Emmanouilidou	Greece	23.77	NU20R
11	2	Elisa Visentin	Italy	23.81	PB
12	3	Maria Mihalache	Romania	23.82	
13	1	Medhani Batuwanage	Sri Lanka	23.95	PB
14	1	Isabella Goudros	Canada	23.98	
15	1	Alessandra Iezzi	Italy	24.03	
16	3	Viwe Jingqi	South Africa	24.04	
17	3	Tereza Lamačová	Czech Republic	24.11	
18	2	Kayla la Grange	South Africa	24.26	
19	3	Lukrecija Sabaitytė	Lithuania	24.28	
20	2	Mariandré Chacón	Guatemala	24.36	
21	2	Anita Taviore	Nigeria	24.37	
22	1	Simay Özçiftçi	Turkey	24.38	
23	1	Erica Barbosa	Brazil	24.54	
	3	Ivana Ilić	Serbia	DNF	

=== Final ===
The final was held on 21 August at 18:03.

Wind: +1.1 m/s

Rank	Lane	Name	Nationality	Time	Note
1st place, gold medalist(s)	6	Christine Mboma	Namibia	21.84	CR
2nd place, silver medalist(s)	4	Beatrice Masilingi	Namibia	22.18	PB
3rd place, bronze medalist(s)	5	Favour Ofili	Nigeria	22.23	NU20R
4	7	Lucia Carrillo	Spain	23.51	
5	1	Barbora Šplechtnová	Czech Republic	23.79	
6	2	Marta Zimna	Poland	23.85	
7	8	Aalliyah Francis	Jamaica	23.96	
	3	Brianna Lyston	Jamaica	DQ	TR17.3.1
