= Athletics at the 2020 Summer Olympics – Women's 200 metres =

Women's 200 metres at the Games of the XXXII Olympiad
- Olympic Athletics
- Venue: Japan National Stadium
- Dates: 2 August 2021 (heats & semifinals); 3 August 2021 (final)
- Competitors: 41 from 31 nations
- Winning time: 21.53

Medalists
| 1st place, gold medalist(s) | | Elaine Thompson-Herah | Jamaica |
| 2nd place, silver medalist(s) | | Christine Mboma | Namibia |
| 3rd place, bronze medalist(s) | | Gabrielle Thomas | United States |

The women's 200 metres event at the 2020 Summer Olympics took place on 2 and 3 August 2021 at the Japan National Stadium. 41 athletes from 31 nations competed. In successfully defending her title, Elaine Thompson-Herah became the first woman in history to win both the 100 and 200 metres titles at successive games. Her winning time of 21.53 secs, moved her to second on the world all-time list behind Florence Griffith Joyner, and broke Merlene Ottey's 30-year-old Jamaican record. The winning margin was 0.28 seconds. Surprisingly, Thompson-Herah had the slowest reaction time in the final.

== Summary ==
The field included six of the top 25 women in history, three of whom set their personal bests earlier in the season. The defending champion Elaine Thompson-Herah was rounding into form having defended her 100m title three days earlier. The world leader coming into the Olympics was Gabrielle Thomas, who ran the #2 time in history to win the US Trials. Two unknown commodities were Namibian teenagers Beatrice Masilingi and Christine Mboma, who had run exceptional 400m times earlier in the season, but less than a month before the Olympics, they were blocked from running in that event due to their having excess natural testosterone. The 200 metres was their back up event because it is exempted from the rule's limited range of events.

In the second heat, Masilingi set the National Record. In the fourth heat, Mboma broke it, in the process surprising Thomas. What was particularly shocking was the terrible start of Mboma, with Thomas making up the stagger in the first few steps of the race, and the awkward but blazing speed she had in the last half of the race. Returning silver medalist Dafne Schippers failed to qualify in the first semi-final, where Shelly-Ann Fraser-Pryce and Masilingi did. In the second semi, Thompson-Herah equalled her personal best, but behind her with superior top end speed was Mboma, again beating Thomas while setting the world junior record at 21.97.

In the final, Fraser-Pryce had a rocket start as would be predictable considering her history, three lanes outside of her in a matching Jamaican uniform, Thompson-Herah was keeping pace. In stark contrast, Mboma trailed the field with Shaunae Miller-Uibo and Masilingi. Coming off the turn, Thomas was barely behind Fraser-Pryce and Thompson-Herah. From there, Thompson-Herah pulled away as Thomas slowly chipped away at Fraser-Pryce's slight advantage. Miller-Uibo's closing speed was not present, but Mboma's was, rocketing past four of the top sprinters in the world in a different gear. Mboma passed Fraser-Pryce and Thomas ten metres out, beating Thomas for the third time to take silver. Thomas beat Fraser-Pryce for bronze.

== Background ==
This was the 19th time the event was held, having appeared at every Olympics since 1948.

== Qualification ==
A National Olympic Committee (NOC) could enter up to 3 qualified athletes in the women's 200 metres event if all athletes meet the entry standard or qualify by ranking during the qualifying period. (The limit of 3 has been in place since the 1930 Olympic Congress.) The qualifying standard is 22.80 seconds. This standard was "set for the sole purpose of qualifying athletes with exceptional performances unable to qualify through the IAAF World Rankings pathway." The world rankings, based on the average of the best five results for the athlete over the qualifying period and weighted by the importance of the meet, will then be used to qualify athletes until the cap of 56 is reached.

The qualifying period was originally from 1 May 2019 to 29 June 2020. Due to the COVID-19 pandemic, the period was suspended from 6 April 2020 to 30 November 2020, with the end date extended to 29 June 2021. The world rankings period start date was also changed from 1 May 2019 to 30 June 2020; athletes who had met the qualifying standard during that time were still qualified, but those using world rankings would not be able to count performances during that time. The qualifying time standards could be obtained in various meets during the given period that have the approval of the IAAF. Both indoor and outdoor meets were eligible for qualification. The most recent Area Championships may be counted in the ranking, even if not during the qualifying period.

NOCs can also use their universality place—each NOC can enter one female athlete regardless of time if they had no female athletes meeting the entry standard for an athletics event—in the 200 metres.

== Competition format ==
The event continued to use the three-round format introduced in 2012.

== Records ==
Prior to this competition, the existing global and area records were as follows.

| World record | Florence Griffith Joyner (USA) | 21.34 s | Seoul, South Korea | 29 September 1988 |
| Olympic record | Florence Griffith Joyner (USA) | 21.34 s | Seoul, South Korea | 29 September 1988 |
| World Leading | Gabrielle Thomas (USA) | 21.61 s | Eugene, Oregon, United States | 26 June 2021 |

| Area | Time (s) | Wind | Athlete | Nation |
|---|---|---|---|---|
| Africa (records) | 22.04 | +0.5 | Blessing Okagbare | Nigeria |
| Asia (records) | 22.01 | +0.0 | Li Xuemei | China |
| Europe (records) | 21.63 | +0.3 | Dafne Schippers | Netherlands |
| North, Central America and Caribbean (records) | 21.34 WR | +1.3 | Florence Griffith Joyner | United States |
| Oceania (records) | 22.23 | +0.8 | Melinda Gainsford-Taylor | Australia |
| South America (records) | 22.48 | +1.0 | Ana Cláudia Lemos | Brazil |

The following national records were established during the competition:

| Country | Athlete | Round | Time | Notes |
|---|---|---|---|---|
| Namibia | Beatrice Masilingi | Round 1 | 22.63 | |
| Namibia | Christine Mboma | Round 1 | 22.11 | |
| Namibia | Christine Mboma | Semifinals | 21.97 | WU20R, AR |
| Namibia | Christine Mboma | Final | 21.81 | WU20R, AR |
| Switzerland | Mujinga Kambundji | Round 1 | 22.26 | |
| Switzerland | Mujinga Kambundji | Semifinals | 22.26 | |
| Niger | Aminatou Seyni | Semifinals | 22.54 | |
| Jamaica | Elaine Thompson-Herah | Final | 21.53 | |

== Schedule ==
All times are Japan Standard Time (UTC+9)

The women's 200 metres took place over two consecutive days.

| Date | Time | Round |
|---|---|---|
| Monday, 2 August 2021 | 9:00; 19:00 | Round 1 Semifinals |
| Tuesday, 3 August 2021 | 19:00 | Final |

== Results ==
=== Round 1 ===
Qualification rule: first three finishers of each heat (Q) plus the next three fastest times (q) qualify to the semifinals.

==== Heat 1 ====
| Rank | Lane | Athlete | Nation | Reaction | Time | Notes |
|---|---|---|---|---|---|---|
| 1 | 6 | Marie-Josée Ta Lou | Ivory Coast | 0.170 | 22.30 | Q |
| 2 | 3 | Shaunae Miller-Uibo | Bahamas | 0.137 | 22.40 | Q |
| 3 | 8 | Nzubechi Grace Nwokocha | Nigeria | 0.156 | 22.47 | Q, PB |
| 4 | 4 | Gloria Hooper | Italy | 0.191 | 23.16 | q, SB |
| 5 | 2 | Ana Azevedo | Brazil | 0.192 | 23.20 | SB |
| 6 | 5 | Olga Safronova | Kazakhstan | 0.162 | 23.64 | |
| | | | | Wind: +0.3 m/s | | |

==== Heat 2 ====
| Rank | Lane | Athlete | Nation | Reaction | Time | Notes |
|---|---|---|---|---|---|---|
| 1 | 6 | Shelly-Ann Fraser-Pryce | Jamaica | 0.140 | 22.22 | Q |
| 2 | 3 | Beatrice Masilingi | Namibia | 0.185 | 22.63 | Q, NR |
| 3 | 2 | Dafne Schippers | Netherlands | 0.151 | 23.13 | Q |
| 4 | 8 | Lisa-Marie Kwayie | Germany | 0.169 | 23.14 | q |
| 5 | 7 | Rafaéla Spanoudaki-Hatziriga | Greece | 0.131 | 23.16 | q |
| 6 | 4 | Lucia Moris | South Sudan | 0.149 | 25.24 | |
| 7 | 5 | Najma Parveen | Pakistan | 0.173 | 28.12 | SB |
| | | | | Wind: +0.4 m/s | | |

==== Heat 3 ====
| Rank | Lane | Athlete | Nation | Reaction | Time | Notes |
|---|---|---|---|---|---|---|
| 1 | 8 | Mujinga Kambundji | Switzerland | 0.129 | 22.26 | Q, =NR |
| 2 | 5 | Anavia Battle | United States | 0.129 | 22.54 | Q |
| 3 | 4 | Gémima Joseph | France | 0.153 | 22.94 | Q |
| 4 | 7 | Jaël Bestué | Spain | 0.171 | 23.19 | PB |
| 5 | 6 | Inna Eftimova | Bulgaria | 0.141 | 23.42 | |
| | | | | Wind: -0.2 m/s | | |

==== Heat 4 ====
| Rank | Lane | Athlete | Nation | Reaction | Time | Notes |
|---|---|---|---|---|---|---|
| 1 | 3 | Christine Mboma | Namibia | 0.275 | 22.11 | Q, WU20R, NR |
| 2 | 2 | Gabrielle Thomas | United States | 0.172 | 22.20 | Q |
| 3 | 5 | Aminatou Seyni | Niger | 0.144 | 22.72 | Q, SB |
| 4 | 8 | Rhoda Njobvu | Zambia | 0.145 | 23.33 | |
| 5 | 6 | Jessica-Bianca Wessolly | Germany | 0.176 | 23.41 | |
| 6 | 4 | Vitória Cristina Rosa | Brazil | 0.187 | 23.59 | |
| 7 | 7 | Dutee Chand | India | 0.140 | 23.85 | SB |
| | | | | Wind: +0.7 m/s | | |

==== Heat 5 ====
| Rank | Lane | Athlete | Nation | Reaction | Time | Notes |
|---|---|---|---|---|---|---|
| 1 | 4 | Anthonique Strachan | Bahamas | 0.155 | 22.76 | Q, =SB |
| 2 | 6 | Lorène Bazolo | Portugal | 0.130 | 23.21 | Q |
| 3 | 7 | Dalia Kaddari | Italy | 0.144 | 23.26 (23.251) | Q |
| 4 | 2 | Shericka Jackson | Jamaica | 0.167 | 23.26 (23.255) | |
| 5 | 3 | Ivet Lalova-Collio | Bulgaria | 0.158 | 23.39 | SB |
| 6 | 5 | Shanti Pereira | Singapore | 0.164 | 23.96 | SB |
| | | | | Wind: -0.3 m/s | | |

==== Heat 6 ====
| Rank | Lane | Athlete | Nation | Reaction | Time | Notes |
|---|---|---|---|---|---|---|
| 1 | 6 | Crystal Emmanuel | Canada | 0.157 | 22.74 | Q, SB |
| 2 | 8 | Beth Dobbin | Great Britain | 0.136 | 22.78 | Q, =SB |
| 3 | 5 | Elaine Thompson-Herah | Jamaica | 0.165 | 22.86 | Q |
| 4 | 4 | Imke Vervaet | Belgium | 0.138 | 23.05 | q, PB |
| 5 | 7 | Phil Healy | Ireland | 0.140 | 23.21 | SB |
| | | | | Wind: +0.4 m/s | | |

==== Heat 7 ====
| Rank | Lane | Athlete | Nation | Reaction | Time | Notes |
|---|---|---|---|---|---|---|
| 1 | 2 | Jenna Prandini | United States | 0.163 | 22.56 | Q |
| 2 | 6 | Gina Bass | The Gambia | 0.158 | 22.74 | Q |
| 3 | 7 | Riley Day | Australia | 0.155 | 22.94 | Q |
| 4 | 5 | Maja Mihalinec Zidar | Slovenia | 0.145 | 23.62 | SB |
| 5 | 4 | Kristina Knott | Philippines | 0.133 | 23.80 | |
| | 8 | Jamile Samuel | Netherlands | | | DNS |
| | | | | Wind: +0.9 m/s | | |

=== Semifinals ===
Qualification rule: first 2 of each heat (Q) plus the 2 fastest times (q) qualified.

==== Semifinal 1 ====
| Rank | Lane | Athlete | Nation | Reaction | Time | Notes |
|---|---|---|---|---|---|---|
| 1 | 6 | Shelly-Ann Fraser-Pryce | Jamaica | 0.143 | 22.13 | Q |
| 2 | 4 | Beatrice Masilingi | Namibia | 0.181 | 22.40 | Q, PB |
| 3 | 5 | Anthonique Strachan | Bahamas | 0.153 | 22.56 (22.551) | SB |
| 4 | 9 | Riley Day | Australia | 0.147 | 22.56 (22.557) | PB |
| 5 | 7 | Jenna Prandini | United States | 0.142 | 22.57 | |
| 6 | 2 | Dafne Schippers | Netherlands | 0.151 | 23.03 | |
| 7 | 8 | Lorène Bazolo | Portugal | 0.138 | 23.20 | |
| 8 | 3 | Lisa Marie Kwayie | Germany | 0.169 | 23.42 | |
| | | | | Wind: +0.3 m/s | | |

==== Semifinal 2 ====
| Rank | Lane | Athlete | Nation | Reaction | Time | Notes |
|---|---|---|---|---|---|---|
| 1 | 9 | Elaine Thompson-Herah | Jamaica | 0.165 | 21.66 | Q, =PB |
| 2 | 4 | Christine Mboma | Namibia | 0.212 | 21.97 | Q, WU20R, AR |
| 3 | 6 | Gabrielle Thomas | United States | 0.156 | 22.01 | q |
| 4 | 5 | Gina Bass | The Gambia | 0.144 | 22.67 | |
| 5 | 8 | Beth Dobbin | Great Britain | 0.145 | 22.85 | |
| 6 | 7 | Crystal Emmanuel | Canada | 0.166 | 23.05 | |
| 7 | 2 | Gemima Joseph | France | 0.168 | 23.19 | |
| 8 | 1 | Gloria Hooper | Italy | 0.197 | 23.28 | |
| 9 | 3 | Rafaéla Spanoudaki-Hatziriga | Greece | 0.117 | 23.38 | |
| | | | | Wind: +0.3 m/s | | |

==== Semifinal 3 ====
| Rank | Lane | Athlete | Nation | Reaction | Time | Notes |
|---|---|---|---|---|---|---|
| 1 | 6 | Marie-Josée Ta Lou | Ivory Coast | 0.178 | 22.11 | Q, SB |
| 2 | 5 | Shaunae Miller-Uibo | Bahamas | 0.154 | 22.14 | Q |
| 3 | 7 | Mujinga Kambundji | Switzerland | 0.139 | 22.26 | q, =NR |
| 4 | 9 | Nzubechi Grace Nwokocha | Nigeria | 0.172 | 22.47 | =PB |
| 5 | 8 | Aminatou Seyni | Niger | 0.156 | 22.54 | NR |
| 6 | 4 | Anavia Battle | United States | 0.167 | 23.02 | |
| 7 | 2 | Imke Vervaet | Belgium | 0.139 | 23.31 | |
| 8 | 3 | Dalia Kaddari | Italy | 0.134 | 23.41 | |
| | | | | Wind: +0.1 m/s | | |

=== Final ===
| Rank | Lane | Athlete | Nation | Reaction | Time | Notes |
|---|---|---|---|---|---|---|
| 1st place, gold medalist(s) | 7 | Elaine Thompson-Herah | Jamaica | 0.173 | 21.53 | NR |
| 2nd place, silver medalist(s) | 5 | Christine Mboma | Namibia | 0.169 | 21.81 | WU20R, AR |
| 3rd place, bronze medalist(s) | 3 | Gabrielle Thomas | United States | 0.159 | 21.87 | |
| 4 | 4 | Shelly-Ann Fraser-Pryce | Jamaica | 0.141 | 21.94 | |
| 5 | 6 | Marie-Josée Ta Lou | Ivory Coast | 0.150 | 22.27 | |
| 6 | 8 | Beatrice Masilingi | Namibia | 0.166 | 22.28 | PB |
| 7 | 2 | Mujinga Kambundji | Switzerland | 0.147 | 22.30 | |
| 8 | 9 | Shaunae Miller-Uibo | Bahamas | 0.145 | 24.00 | |
| | | | | Wind: +0.8 m/s | | |
