= 2021 World Athletics U20 Championships – Men's 3000 metres =

Men's 3000 metres at the 2021 World Athletics U20 Championships
- Venue: Kasarani Stadium
- Dates: 18 August
- Competitors: 16 from 12 nations
- Winning time: 7:42.09

Medalists
gold medal	Tadese Worku	Ethiopia
silver medal	Ali Abdilmana	Ethiopia
bronze medal	Habtom Samuel	Eritrea

The men's 3000 metres at the 2021 World Athletics U20 Championships was held at the Kasarani Stadium on 18 August.

== Records ==
Standing records prior to the 2021 World Athletics U20 Championships
World U20 Record	Yomif Kejelcha (ETH)	7:28.19	Paris, France	27 August 2016
Championship Record	New event			
World U20 Leading	Tadese Worku (ETH)	7:34.75	Székesfehérvár, Hungary	6 July 2021

== Results ==
The final was held on 18 August at 17:50.

Rank	Name	Nationality	Time	Note
1st place, gold medalist(s)	Tadese Worku	Ethiopia	7:42.09	CR
2nd place, silver medalist(s)	Ali Abdilmana	Ethiopia	7:44.55	PB
3rd place, bronze medalist(s)	Habtom Samuel	Eritrea	7:52.69	PB
4	Merhawi Mebrahtu	Eritrea	7:55.50	PB
5	Lionel Nihimbazwe	Burundi	8:04.07	PB
6	Dismas Yeko	Uganda	8:08.76	
7	Daniel Kinyanjui	Kenya	8:09.40	
8	Dan Kibet	Uganda	8:09.98	
9	Benard Kibet Yegon	Kenya	8:12.96	
10	Yassine Laarj	Morocco	8:27.59	
11	Jason Bowers	South Africa	8:30.76	
12	Devrim Kazan	Turkey	8:52.01	
13	Vid Botolin	Slovenia	9:10.10	
14	Ajit Yadav	Nepal	9:15.27	SB
	Abdifatah Aden Hassan	Somalia	DNF	
	Joseph Loboi Morris	Athlete Refugee Team	DQ	TR17.3.2
