= Tadese Worku =

Ethiopian long-distance runner

Personal information
- National team: Ethiopia
- Born: 20 January 2002 (age 24) Ethiopia
- Agent: Gianni Demadonna

Sport
- Sport: Athletics
- Event: Long-distance running

Achievements and titles
- Personal bests: 3000 m: 7:34.75 (Székesfehérvár 2021); 5000 m: 13:18.17 (Rovereto 2019); 10,000 m: 26:45.91 (Hengelo 2022); 5km: 13:23 (Bolzano 2020); 10km: 26:56 (Herzogenaurach 2021) NR
Medal record
Men's athletics
Representing Ethiopia
World Cross Country Championships
Gold medal – first place	2026 Tallahassee	Senior team
World U20 Championships
Gold medal – first place	2021 Nairobi	3000 m
Silver medal – second place	2021 Nairobi	5000 m
World Road Running Championships
Silver medal – second place	2026 Copenhagen	Half marathon team

Tadese Worku Gebresilasie (born 20 January 2002) is an Ethiopian long-distance runner. He won the 3000 metres at the 2021 World Athletics U20 Championships.
