= 2022 World Athletics U20 Championships – Men's 5000 metres =

Men's 5000 metres at the 2022 World Athletics U20 Championships
- Venue: Estadio Olímpico Pascual Guerrero
- Dates: 1 August
- Competitors: 22 from 16 nations
- Winning time: 14:03.05

Medalists
| gold medal | Addisu Yihune | Ethiopia |
| silver medal | Merhawi Mebrahtu | Eritrea |
| bronze medal | Habtom Samuel | Eritrea |

The men's 5000 metres at the 2022 World Athletics U20 Championships was held at the Estadio Olímpico Pascual Guerrero in Cali, Colombia on 1 August 2022.

22 athletes from 16 countries entered to the competition.

== Records ==
U20 standing records prior to the 2022 World Athletics U20 Championships were as follows:

| Record | Athlete & Nationality | Mark | Location | Date |
|---|---|---|---|---|
| World U20 Record | Selemon Barega (ETH) | 12:43.02 | Brussels, Belgium | 31 August 2018 |
| Championship Record | Abreham Cherkos (ETH) | 13:08.57 | Bydgoszcz, Poland | 13 July 2008 |
| World U20 Leading | Levy Kibet (KEN) | 13:01.32 | Rome, Italy | 9 June 2022 |

== Results ==
The final race started at 17:26 on 1 August 2022. The results were as follows:

| Rank | Name | Nationality | Time | Note |
|---|---|---|---|---|
| 1st place, gold medalist(s) | Addisu Yihune | Ethiopia | 14:03.05 | |
| 2nd place, silver medalist(s) | Merhawi Mebrahtu | Eritrea | 14:03.33 | |
| 3rd place, bronze medalist(s) | Habtom Samuel | Eritrea | 14:03.67 | |
| 4 | Gebeyehu Belay | Ethiopia | 14:04.55 | |
| 5 | Rogers Kibet | Uganda | 14:07.71 | |
| 6 | Samuel Kibathi | Kenya | 14:07.82 | |
| 7 | Hiroto Yoshioka | Japan | 14:10.68 | |
| 8 | Nelson Mandela | Kenya | 14:13.21 | |
| 9 | Peter Maru | Uganda | 14:13.71 | |
| 10 | Abdikani Mohamed Hamid | Bahrain | 14:22.32 | |
| 11 | Keita Satoh | Japan | 14:26.19 | |
| 12 | Tyrone Gorze | United States | 14:32.23 | |
| 13 | Dean Casey | Ireland | 14:37.79 | |
| 14 | Jaime Migallón | Spain | 14:40.45 | |
| 15 | Ateka Demisie | Israel | 14:40.68 | |
| 16 | David Ninavia | Bolivia | 14:42.76 | |
| 17 | Niel van der Merwe | South Africa | 14:59.04 | |
| 18 | Archie Noakes | Australia | 15:00.22 | |
| 19 | Johnny Livingstone | Great Britain | 15:01.59 | |
| 20 | Joad Martinho | France | 15:04.13 | |
| 21 | Konrad Pogorzelski | Poland | 15:23.03 | |
| | Dylan Throop | United States | DNF | |
