= Beatrice Masilingi =

Namibian sprinter

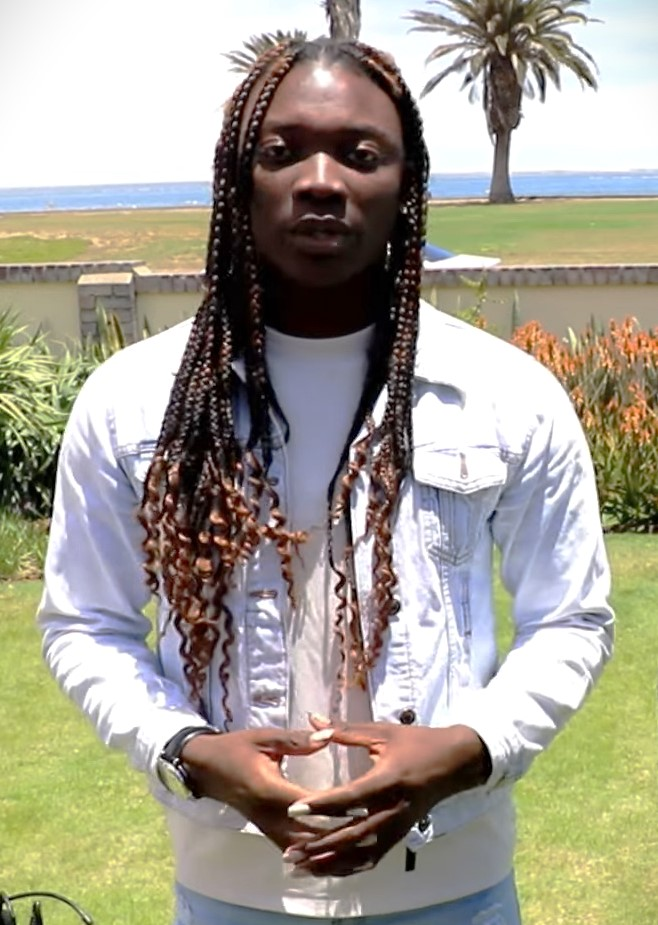
- Masilingi in 2021

Personal information
- Born: 10 April 2003 (age 23) Katima Mulilo, Zambezi Region, Namibia
- Height: 1.72 m (5 ft 8 in)

Sport
- Country: Namibia
- Sport: Track and field
- Event: Sprints
- Club: Quinton-Steele Botes AC
- Coached by: Henk Botha

Achievements and titles
- Personal bests: 100 m: 11.20 NU20R NR (Nairobi 2021); 200 m: 22.18 (Nairobi 2021); 400 m: 49.53 (Lusaka 2021)
Medal record
Women's athletics
Representing Namibia
World U20 Championships
Silver medal – second place	2021 Nairobi	100 m
Silver medal – second place	2021 Nairobi	200 m
Silver medal – second place	2021 Nairobi	4×100 m

Beatrice Masilingi (born 10 April 2003) is a Namibian sprinter. At the age of 18, she placed sixth in the 200 metres at the 2020 Tokyo Olympics, having made the final along with fellow Namibian sprinter and eventual silver medallist Christine Mboma. Masilingi won silver medals in both the 100 metres and 200 m at the 2021 World Under-20 Championships.

Masilingi achieved in the 400 metres the second-fastest world under-18 time, and the third-fastest world under-20 time in history, with her marks of 50.42 and 49.53 seconds set in December 2020 and April 2021, respectively.

Weeks before the 2021 Tokyo Games, World Athletics had announced that both Masilingi and Mboma would not be allowed to compete under the female classification in events between 400 metres and one mile due to its regulations on testosterone levels for athletes with XY disorders of sex development.

== Early life ==
Masilingi was born on 10 April 2003 in Katima Mulilo, a town in the Zambezi Region of Namibia. She was raised by her grandmother Elizabeth Muwaye Kamwi and attended Grootfontein Agricultural College in Grootfontein.

== Career ==
=== Junior career ===
In May 2019, 16-year-old Masilingi won four gold medals at the school's Cossasa Games in Manzini, Eswatini, setting records in the 100, 200, and 400 metres. In the latter, she clocked a personal best time of 53.09 s (no WA recognition, its database shows 52.33 on 18 May in Windhoek, Namibia). In July, at the Southern Africa Athletics Championships in Moka, Mauritius, she won gold medals in both the 200 and 400 metres and set the former distance PB of 23.76 s. She took part in the 2019 African Games in Rabat, Morocco in August, and finished 7th in the 400 m with a time of 52.56 s.

On 7 March 2020, the sprinter timed her new personal best of 52.19 seconds in Swakopmund, Namibia. On 3 October, Masilingi competed at the Kip Keino Classic meet in Nairobi, Kenya and improved greatly to set an African U18 best and Namibian senior record of 50.99 s. Afterwards, she was offered a full scholarship from the University of Oklahoma. In November, she won gold medals in the 100, 200, and 400 metres races at the Namibian Championships in Windhoek. In December, she improved in these events to 11.38 s (Windhoek), 22.71 s (Pretoria, illegal wind), 50.44 s and then 50.42 s (Pretoria), respectively. Her result in the 400 m was the 2020 world-leading time, the new national senior and also the African U20 record.

==== 2021 ====
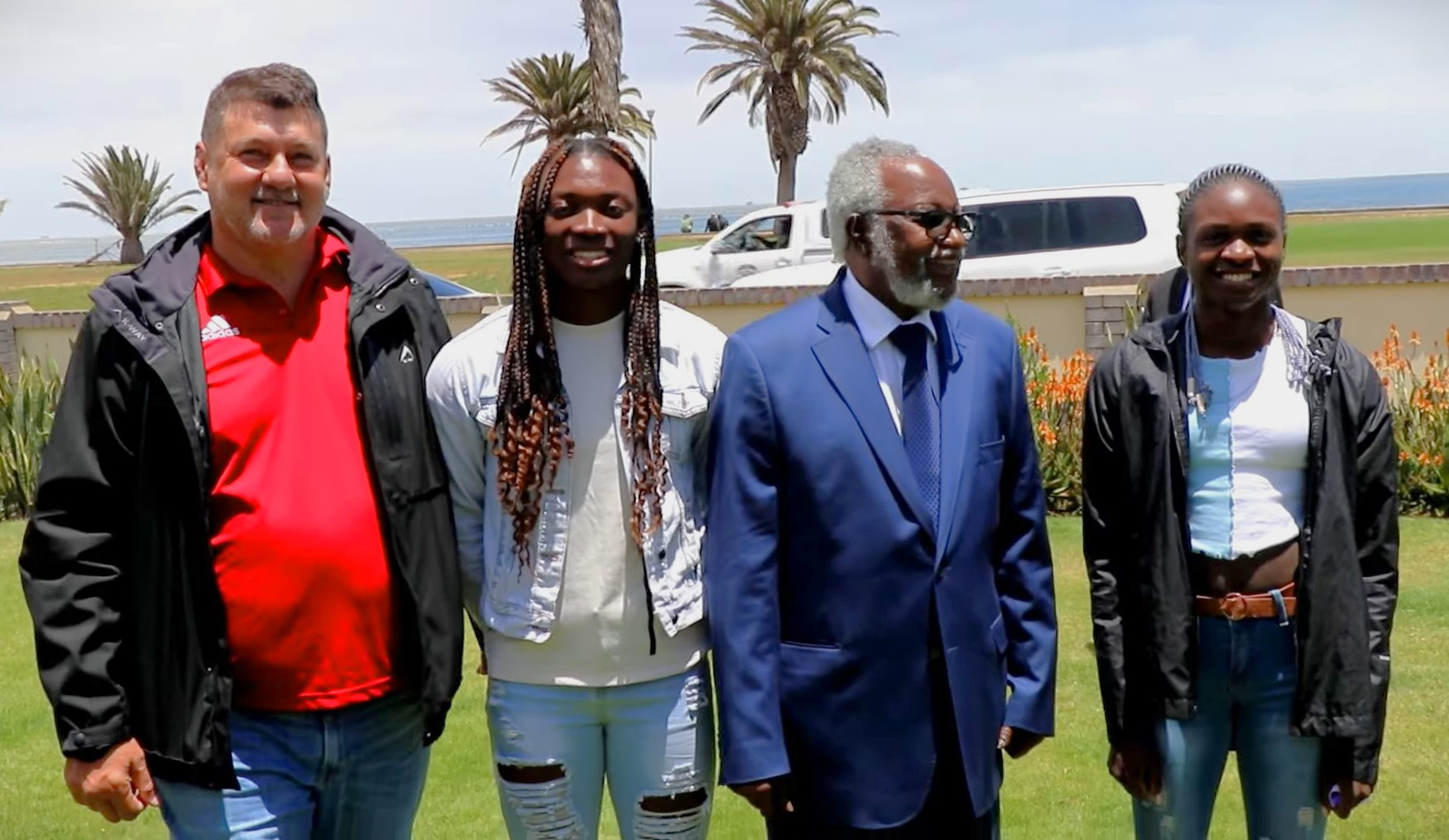
L to R: Coach Henk Botha, Masilingi, former president Sam Nujoma, runner Christine Mboma at the Sam Nujoma Foundation, Walvis Bay, in 2021

On 10 April, at the All-Comers Meet in Lusaka, Zambia, Masilingi set a new personal best and Namibian record in the 200 metres, running 22.72 s. On 11 April, she greatly lowered her best in the 400 m to 49.53 s – the third-fastest world U20 time in history; she lost only to her compatriot, Christine Mboma, who set an unofficial world u20 record. On 20 June, Masilingi confirmed her form in Europe at the Kusociński Memorial in Chorzów, Poland, winning 400 m with a time of 49.88 s. She set a stadium record, and her time was only 0.13 s slower than the 1976 meet and world record of 49.75 s, which was set by Irena Szewińska when she was 30 years old.

She was withdrawn from the 400 metres race at the postponed 2020 Tokyo Olympics; the Namibian athletics federation announced that she would compete in the 200 m event for which she also qualified. At the Games Masilingi placed sixth in the women's 200 m, running a personal best time of 22.28 s in the final.

== Testosterone levels controversy ==
In July 2021, the Namibian National Olympic Committee announced that Masilingi and fellow Namibian sprinter Christine Mboma would not be allowed to compete in the 400 m event at the Tokyo Olympics, due to World Athletics rules introduced in 2018 requiring that athletes with certain XY DSDs participating in women's running events from 400 metres to one mile cannot have blood testosterone levels above 5 nmol/L. Masilingi and Mboma underwent a medical assessment at a training camp in Italy in early 2021, at which they tested positive for elevated testosterone levels due to a naturally occurring genetic condition. Both sprinters had been unaware of the condition before the evaluation.

Parallels were drawn between Masilingi, Mboma and South African middle-distance runner Caster Semenya, who was the most prominent athlete to be affected by the World Athletics 2018 rule change, and who also did not participate in the 2020 Olympics. The controversy around Masilingi's withdrawal centred on the fact that the 2018 rule on testosterone levels explicitly applies to intersex athletes with XY DSDs such as Semenya, while Abner Xoagub, president of the Namibia National Olympic Committee, at first said in a voice clip that Masilingi and Mboma "have XX chromosomes." The World Athletics regulations in question, however, apply only to athletes with an XY karyotype and a DSD diagnosis, casting doubt on Xoagub's statement. Xoagub also accused World Athletics of breaking a confidentiality agreement concerning the results of the initial medical assessment. Before the Tokyo Olympics, the Namibia NOC issued an official statement acknowledging the assessment of World Athletics while stating that the athletes had previously been unaware of their condition.

== Achievements ==
All information is taken from the World Athletics profile.

=== International competitions ===
Representing Namibia
Year	Competition	Venue	Position	Event	Time	Notes
2021	Olympic Games	Tokyo, Japan	6th	200 m	22.28	(+0.8 m/s) PB
2021	World U20 Championships	Nairobi, Kenya	2nd	100 m	11.39	(-0.6 m/s) (NU20R NR h (Note: In the heats Masilingi set personal best time of 11.20 seconds))
2021	World U20 Championships	Nairobi, Kenya	2nd	200 m	22.18	(+1.1 m/s) PB
2021	World U20 Championships	Nairobi, Kenya	2nd	4 × 100 m relay	43.76	NU20R NR
2022	World Championships	Eugene, OR, United States	24th (sf)	200 m	24.78	(22.27 h)

=== Personal bests ===
Event	Time (s)	Wind (m/s)	Venue	Date	Notes
100 metres	11.20	+1.0	Nairobi, Kenya	18 August 2021	NU20R NR
200 metres	22.18	+1.1	Nairobi, Kenya	21 August 2021	
400 metres	49.53	—N/a	Lusaka, Zambia	11 April 2021	A
4x100 m relay	43.76	—N/a	Nairobi, Kenya	22 August 2021	A NU20R NR

=== Season's bests ===
Year	400 m	Notes	200 m	Notes	100 m	Notes
2018	–		25.06		–	
2019	52.33		23.76		11.93	
2020	50.42	#2 U18 all time	22.94		11.38	
2021	49.53	#3 U20 all time	22.18		11.20	NU20R NR
2022	–		22.27		11.24	
