= Testosterone regulations in women's athletics =

The testosterone regulations in women's athletics are a series of policies limiting blood testosterone levels for female athletics competitors as a means of sex verification. They were first published in 2011 by the IAAF (now World Athletics) and last updated following a court victory against the athlete Caster Semenya in May 2019. The first version of the rules applied to all women with high testosterone, but the current version of the rules only applies to athletes with certain XY disorders of sexual development.

Specifically, they set a limit of 5 nmol/L testosterone, which applies only to distances between 400 m and 1 mile (inclusive), other events being unrestricted. Athletes are allowed to compete in the restricted events with medical suppression of testosterone (by contraceptive injections or pills, or physical castration), although in practice many have chosen to switch to unaffected events, most notably the 200 m.

== Semenya case ==
In 2009, 18-year-old Caster Semenya won the women's 800 m World Championship. This caused international headlines, when it was reported that she would be subject to sex testing.

Semenya was cleared to compete again almost a year later. However, she had been told by the IAAF that she would have to suppress her testosterone below 10 nmol/L using medication.

== 2011 rules ==
In April 2011, the IOC and IAAF issued statements following meetings between the two. The IAAF issued a new policy for male-to-female transgender athletes, and a second policy on the 'eligibility of females with hyperandrogenism to compete in women's competition'.

The 2011 IAAF 'hyperandrogenism policy' stated that:

- These regulations replace the IAAF's previous Gender Verification Policy and the IAAF has now abandoned all reference to the terminology 'gender verification' and 'gender policy' in its Rules.

The policy mentioned a three step process, the first a physical examination 'including clinical signs of virilization (physical appearance, deepness of voice, body hair etc), genital characteristics (clitoral hypertrophy)', the second a hormone test, principally the androgenic sex steroids, but also possibly other hormones, and the final stage a full genetic test.

An athlete would be eligible to compete if her testosterone level was below 10 nmol/L, or if she could prove that 'she has an androgen resistance such that she derives no competitive advantage'.

A non-exhaustive list of conditions said to cause hyperandrogenism was provided:

- Congenital adrenal hyperplasia due to 21-hydroxylase deficiency
- Congenital adrenal hyperplasia due to 11β-hydroxylase deficiency
- Congenital adrenal hyperplasia due to 3β-hydroxysteroid dehydrogenase deficiency
- 5α-Reductase deficiency
- Androgen insensitivity syndrome
- Ovotesticular disorder
- 17β-Hydroxysteroid dehydrogenase III deficiency
- Polyendocrine metabolic ovarian syndrome (PMOS)
- Adrenocortical carcinoma
- Luteoma of pregnancy

Some of these conditions are XY DSDs, while others are XX conditions.

The permissible testosterone limit was set based on the testosterone levels of women with PMOS, plus a further five standard deviations. 99% of the female athletes at those competitions had testosterone levels below 3.08 nmol/L. However, a study of endocrine profiles in 693 elite female and male athletes published in 2014 found that only 13.7% of the elite female athletes had high levels of testosterone while as many as 16.5% of the elite male athletes had low levels of testosterone. The authors noted that there is "complete overlap of the range of concentrations seen [between the genders]. This shows that the recent decision of the IOC and IAAF to limit participation in elite events to women with a 'normal' serum testosterone is unsustainable."

The rules are and were controversial, with suggestions that such restrictions are discriminatory. There is evidence that women with DSDs from developing countries were subjected to partial clitoridectomies and gonadectomies following the introduction of the regulations.

== Dutee Chand case ==
In 2013 Indian government introduced 'hyperandrogenism regulations' more restrictive than those published by the IAAF. These regulations stated that "intersex female sports persons with elevated androgen production give rise to a particular concern". The regulations provided that such intersex athletes could compete if their testosterone was less than 2 nmol/L, and where the testosterone level was higher than that, they would be subject to a medical panel which would evaluate based on such factors as lack of secondary female sexual characteristics, undescended testes, and other factors.

In June 2014, Dutee Chand, an Indian athlete, was investigated under these regulations, and subsequently excluded from selection for the Indian team. A case was filed with the Court of Arbitration for Sport, and it was found that the IAAF and Indian authorities had failed to prove that the regulations were proportionate, fair and necessary. Therefore, the rules were suspended from 24 July 2015 in an interim ruling.

== Controversy at the 2016 Olympics ==
The suspension of the IAAF test for testosterone levels led to controversy in the Rio 2016 Olympic Games, in particular related to the participation and performance of South African middle distance runner Caster Semenya. Competitors Lynsey Sharp and Joanna Jóźwik spoke out about their belief that Semenya has a competitive advantage. This brought into question the legitimacy of the silver and bronze medallists who were suspected of also having XY-specific Disorders of sex development (DSD) like Semenya. Silver medalist Francine Niyonsaba later confirmed having an XY-specific DSD in a 2019 interview.

== 2017 testosterone study ==
The 2015 interim CAS ruling gave the IAAF two years to find evidence that endogenous (as distinct from exogenous, aka doping) testosterone is a benefit to female athletes. This was published 10 July 2017, almost two years from the ruling.

The study found that there was no correlation between endogenous testosterone and sporting performance for women in most events. However, for the 400m, 400m hurdles, 800m, hammer and pole vault, a correlation was shown.

The study covered the 2011 and 2013 World Championships. Further to a previous study by the same author covering the 2011 WCs only, where it was noted that there were several samples with testosterone above the normal female level, at least five due to doping, and at least five due to an intersex condition, the 2013 WC was found to have no cases of athletes with high testosterone, as the IAAF rules were being enforced at that time. An accompanying opinion noted that intersex athletes were 140 times more represented in female athletics than in the wider population.

== 2018 rules ==
Although the 2017 study found justification for a link between endogenous testosterone and sporting performance 400-800m events, and the hammer and pole vault, the IAAF's next set of rules, published April 2018, covered events 400 m to 1 mile, inclusive, and did not include the hammer or pole vault. Because of this, it was widely suggested that the IAAF were specifically targeting Caster Semenya.

The IAAF rules excluded athletes from competing in the specified events, unless they reduced their testosterone below 5 nmol/L, a lower level of testosterone than previously, suggested to be a more realistic limit for testosterone for women without DSDs. The regulations were published 23 April 2018, to be effective from 1 November 2018.

Unlike the previous regulations, conditions such as polyendocrine metabolic ovarian syndrome (PMOS) and tumours were no longer included in the restricted conditions, which were:

- Congenital adrenal hyperplasia
- 5α-Reductase deficiency
- Partial androgen insensitivity syndrome
- Ovotesticular disorder
- 17β-Hydroxysteroid dehydrogenase III deficiency
- Any other DSD involving disordered gonadal steroidogenesis

The list of conditions were now mostly XY DSD, but congenital adrenal hyperplasia was still included.

On 19 June 2018, Semenya announced that she would legally challenge the IAAF rules, and the rules were suspended pending the resolution of the case.

== Revised 2019 rules ==
Semenya lost her case, in the Court of Arbitration for Sport on 1 May 2019. During proceedings it was revealed that Semenya has 5α-reductase deficiency, and it was argued that although her hormones are different from both normal male and normal female biology, the advantage afforded by testosterone in the male level is sufficient as to justify the restrictions.

The IAAF also revealed that:

"The DSD Regulations expressly and emphatically stress that they do not connote any judgment or questioning of an individual's sex or gender identity. They are also careful not to spell out that they apply only to 46 XY individuals with fully functioning testes."

Despite this, the IAAF revised the rules to exclude the XX DSD CAH, and released an accompanying statement and FAQ explaining that the regulations ONLY apply to individuals with XY DSDs and testes.

These new rules came into effect on 8 May 2019. The legal case divided commentators such as Doriane Coleman, who testified for the IAAF, arguing that women's sport requires certain biological traits, from commentators such as Eric Vilain, who testified for Semenya, arguing that "sex is not defined by one particular parameter ... for many human reasons, it's so difficult to exclude women who've always lived their entire lives as women — to suddenly tell them 'you just don't belong here.'"

Semenya appealed the decision to the Federal Supreme Court of Switzerland. On 3 June 2019, the Swiss Federal Supreme Court advised that they had "super-provisionally instructed the IAAF to suspend the application of the 'Eligibility Regulations for the Female Classification for athletes with differences of sex development' with respect to the claimant [Semenya]" until the court decides whether to issue an interlocutory injunction. On July 30, 2019, the Swiss Federal Supreme Court reversed its earlier ruling that had suspended the Court of Arbitration for Sport decision and the IAAF rules. For that reason, Semenya, silver medalist Francine Niyonsaba and Olympic bronze medalist Margaret Wambui missed the 2019 World Athletics Championships in Doha in October 2019, while continuing legal appeals. The number 3 ranked 400 meter runner for 2019, Aminatou Seyni had to switch events to a weaker event, the 200 metres, in order to adhere to this rule. On September 8, 2020, the Swiss Federal Supreme Court issued a ruling denying Caster Semenya's appeal. In November 2020 Semenya announced that she will file an appeal against the IAAF testosterone rule at the European Court of Human Rights.

In July 2019, Semenya said that the ongoing issue has "destroyed" her "mentally and physically".

== At the 2020 Olympics ==
At the 2020 Olympics a number of athletes, all from African countries, were withdrawn from their events because they did not meet the eligibility regulations:

- Christine Mboma (Namibia, 400m)
- Beatrice Masilingi (Namibia, 400m)
- Aminatou Seyni (Niger, 400m)
- Caster Semenya (South Africa, 800m)
- Margaret Wambui (Kenya, 800m)
- Francine Niyonsaba (Burundi, 800m)

The three 400m runners switched to the 200 m, where Mboma won the silver medal, with Masilingi also reaching the finals, while Seyni was eliminated in the semi-finals. The success of 18-year-old Mboma resulted in further debate about the eligibility of DSD athletes to compete in women's sport, with World Athletics President Sebastian Coe saying that WA would continue to monitor the situation.

Niyonsaba competed in the 5000 m, where she was disqualified for lane infringement after running among the leaders in her heat. Niyonsaba also competed in the 10000 m, where she finished 5th in a National Record.
