= Athletics at the 2019 African Games – Women's 400 metres =

The women's 400 metres event at the 2019 African Games was held on 26, 27 and 28 August in Rabat.

== Medalists ==
Gold	Silver	Bronze
Galefele Moroko; Botswana	Favour Ofili; Nigeria	Grace Obour; Ghana

== Results ==
=== Heats ===
Qualification: First 3 in each heat (Q) and the next 4 fastest (q) advanced to the semifinals.

Rank	Heat	Name	Nationality	Time	Notes
1	1	Favour Ofili	Nigeria	52.20	Q
2	3	Mary Moraa	Kenya	52.31	Q
3	1	Grace Obour	Ghana	52.53	Q
4	2	Galefele Moroko	Botswana	52.70	Q
5	3	Leni Shida	Uganda	53.31	Q
6	4	Beatrice Masilingi	Namibia	53.33	Q
7	3	Assia Raziki	Morocco	53.43	Q
8	1	Tjipekapora Herunga	Namibia	53.45	Q
9	4	Patience Okon George	Nigeria	53.55	Q
10	3	Eman Elbashl	Egypt	53.68	q
11	4	Linda Kageha	Kenya	54.12	Q
12	1	Marcelle Bouele Bondo	Republic of the Congo	54.20	q
13	1	Nasiba Nabirye	Uganda	54.30	q
14	4	Maggie Barrie	Sierra Leone	54.39	q
15	1	Souliath Saka	Benin	54.70	
16	2	Stella Wonruku	Uganda	54.99	Q
17	2	Amarachukwu Jecinta Obi	Nigeria	55.24	Q
18	2	Linda Angounou Ngouayaka	Cameroon	55.62	
19	2	Worknesh Mesele	Ethiopia	55.79	
20	3	Mariama Mamoudou Ittatou	Niger	55.86	
21	1	Fatou Gaye	Senegal	56.30	
22	3	Tsige Duguma	Ethiopia	56.37	
23	1	Kadia Dembele	Mali	56.59	
24	4	Danel Holton	South Africa	56.91	
25	4	Tlhomphang Basele	Botswana	57.00	
26	4	Msgana Haylu	Ethiopia	57.29	
27	2	Mary Thomas Tarawally	Sierra Leone	57.43	
28	2	Hellen Syombua	Kenya	58.83	
29	3	Mamakoli Senauoane	Lesotho	58.90	
30	4	Tasabih Mahdi	Sudan	1:03.90	
	2	Nafy Mane	Senegal	DQ	R162.7

=== Semifinals ===
Qualification: First 4 in each semifinal (Q) advanced directly to the final.

Rank	Heat	Name	Nationality	Time	Notes
1	1	Galefele Moroko	Botswana	51.53	Q
2	1	Mary Moraa	Kenya	51.75	Q
3	2	Favour Ofili	Nigeria	51.94	Q
4	1	Patience Okon George	Nigeria	51.96	Q
5	1	Leni Shida	Uganda	51.99	Q
6	2	Grace Obour	Ghana	52.14	Q
7	2	Beatrice Masilingi	Namibia	52.39	Q
8	2	Assia Raziki	Morocco	53.07	Q
9	1	Tjipekapora Herunga	Namibia	53.49	
10	1	Nasiba Nabirye	Uganda	53.71	
11	2	Eman Elbashl	Egypt	53.84	
12	2	Stella Wonruku	Uganda	54.11	
13	1	Linda Kageha	Kenya	54.12	
14	1	Marcelle Bouele Bondo	Republic of the Congo	54.65	
15	2	Amarachukwu Jecinta Obi	Nigeria	54.93	
	2	Maggie Barrie	Sierra Leone	DNS	

=== Final ===
Rank	Lane	Name	Nationality	Time	Notes
1st place, gold medalist(s)	3	Galefele Moroko	Botswana	51.30	
2nd place, silver medalist(s)	4	Favour Ofili	Nigeria	51.68	
3rd place, bronze medalist(s)	5	Grace Obour	Ghana	51.86	
4	6	Mary Moraa	Kenya	51.97	
5	8	Patience Okon George	Nigeria	52.18	
6	1	Leni Shida	Uganda	52.47	
7	7	Beatrice Masilingi	Namibia	52.56	
8	2	Assia Raziki	Morocco	53.24	
