= Benson Kiplangat =

Kenyan long-distance runner

Personal information
- National team: Kenyan
- Born: 17 June 2003 (age 23)

Sport
- Country: Kenya
- Sport: Athletics
- Event: long-distance running

Achievements and titles
- Personal best: 5000 m: 13:20.37 (2021)
Medal record
World U20 Championships
Gold medal – first place	2021 Nairobi	5000 m

Benson Kiplangat (born 17 June 2003) is a Kenyan long-distance runner who specializes in the 5000 metres. He was the gold medallist at the World Athletics U20 Championships in 2021.
