= Christine Mboma =

Namibian sprinter

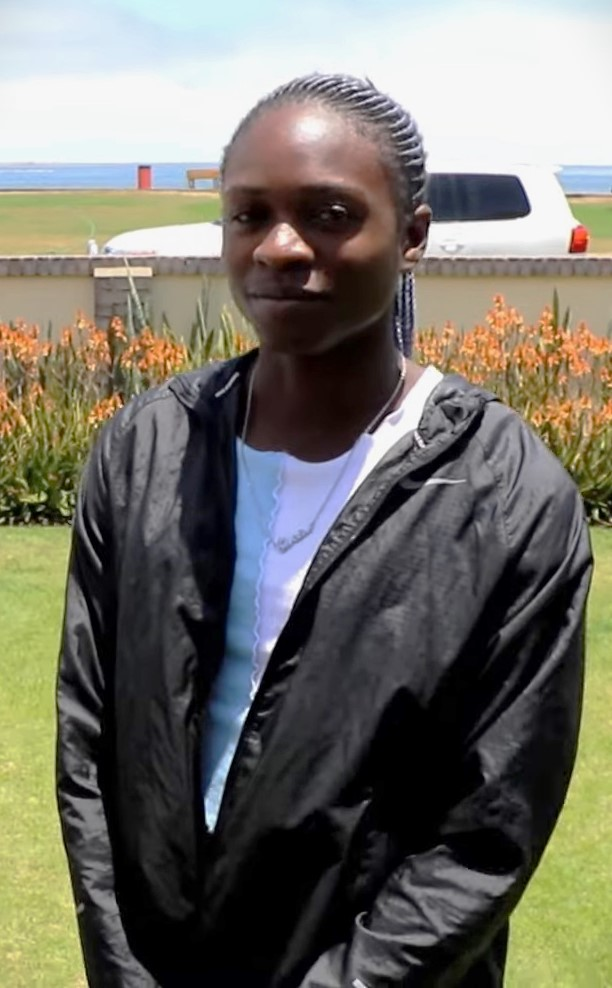
- Mboma in 2021

Personal information
- Full name: Christine Katiku Mboma
- Born: 22 May 2003 (age 23) Shinyungwe, Kavango East, Namibia

Sport
- Country: Namibia
- Sport: Athletics
- Club: Quinton-Steele Botes AC
- Coached by: Henk Botha

Achievements and titles
- Personal bests: 100 m: 10.97 (Gaborone 2022); 200 m: 21.78 (21.81 WU20R) AR (Zürich 2021); 400 m: 49.22 (2021, also 48.54 not recognized); 800 m: 2:03.27 (Lusaka 2021)
Medal record
Women's athletics
Representing Namibia
Olympic Games
Silver medal – second place	2020 Tokyo	200 m
Diamond League
First place	2021	200 m
Commonwealth Games
Bronze medal – third place	2022 Birmingham	200 m
World U20 Championships
Gold medal – first place	2021 Nairobi	200 m
Silver medal – second place	2021 Nairobi	4 × 100 m

Christine Mboma (born 22 May 2003) is a Namibian (Kavango) sprinter who competes in the 100 metres and 200 m. At the age of 18, she won a silver medal in the 200 metres at the 2020 Tokyo Olympics, becoming the first ever Namibian woman to win an Olympic medal and breaking the world under-20 and African senior record. Mboma also won the event at the 2021 World Under-20 Championships and Diamond League final, improving her record mark to 21.78 seconds.

In 2021, the 18-year-old set an unratified world under-20 and African senior record of 48.54 s in the 400 metres, which made her the seventh-fastest woman of all time at the event. The mark was established in June, while Mboma had previously twice broken a world U20 record in April of that year.

Prior to the Tokyo Games, World Athletics had announced that Mboma and fellow Namibian sprinter Beatrice Masilingi would not be allowed to compete under the female classification in events between 400 metres and one mile due to its regulations on testosterone levels for athletes with XY disorders of sex development. Christine Mboma has joined the American-based international CLD Sports marketing and management agency.

== Early life ==
Mboma grew up in Shinyungwe, a village in the Kavango East region of Namibia, as the eldest of three daughters. Her father abandoned her as a baby, and her mother, Patricia, died in 2016 while giving birth, leaving Christine to take care of her younger siblings. Mboma attended Shinyungwe Combined School and then Rocky Crest High School in 2017 and took up athletics. As of 2021 she attends, together with fellow Namibian Olympian Beatrice Masilingi, Grootfontein Agricultural College.

== Career ==
=== Junior career ===
In May 2019, 16-year-old (Note: Age described according to the rules of World Athletics. Technically, for age categories such as U18, U20 and U23, it is calculated "on 31 December of the year of competition" to avoid age group switching during a competitive season) Mboma won the 800 and 1500 metres events at the school's Cossasa Games in Manzini, Eswatini (no WA recognition, its database shows 2m 18.68s in the 800 m on 18 May in Windhoek, Namibia). In July, at the Southern Africa Championships in Moka, Mauritius, she won a bronze medal in the 800 m, clocking 2:17.11.

In November 2020, Mboma won gold medals in the 800 and 1500 m races at the Namibian Championships in Windhoek. On 9 December, she won the 400 and 800 m events in Pretoria, South Africa; in the former distance she set her personal best of 51.81 s. She clocked an even better time of 51.57 s at the Namibian Youth Games in Windhoek on 17 December.

==== 2021 ====
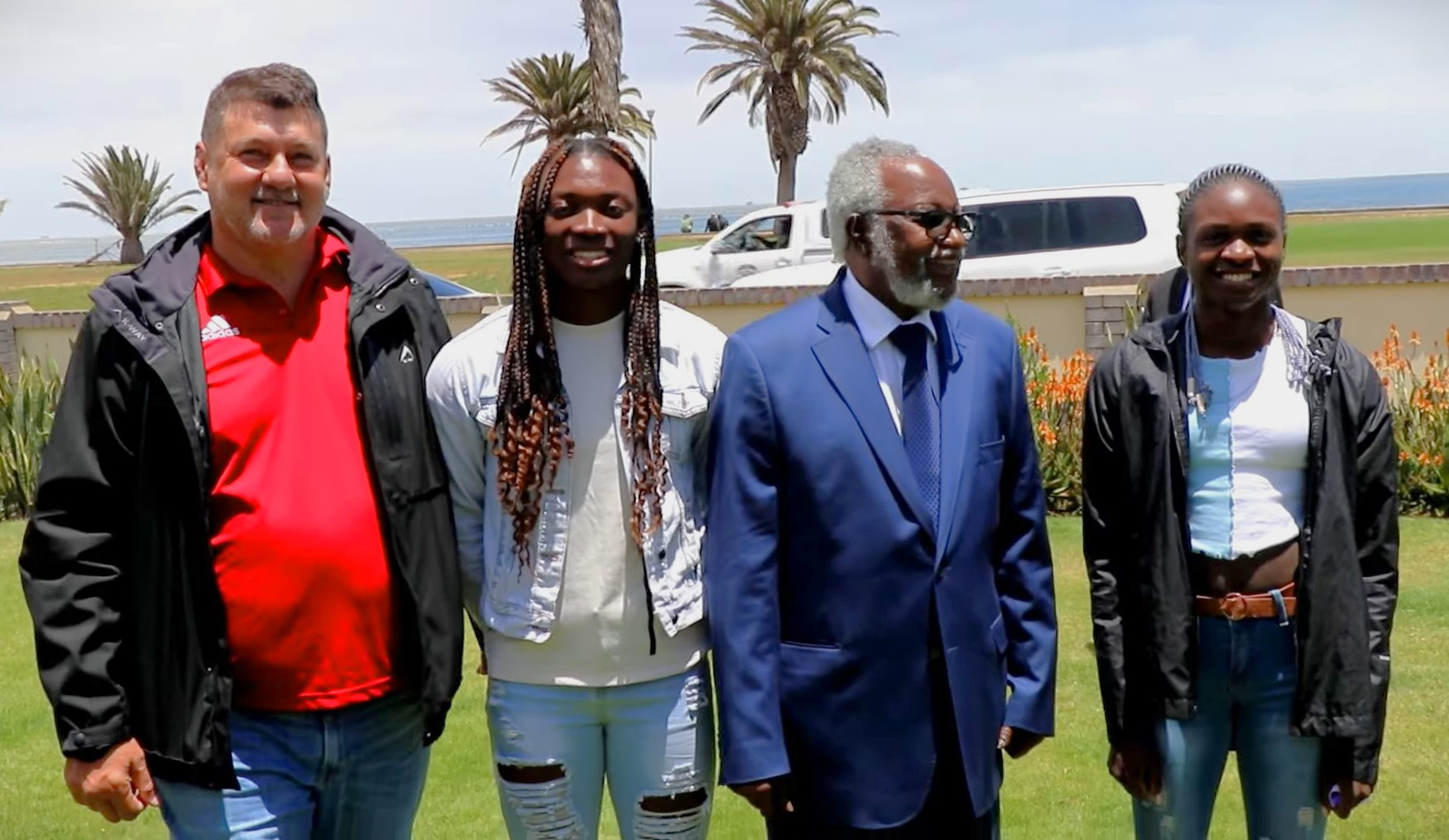
L to R: Coach Henk Botha, runner Beatrice Masilingi, and former president Sam Nujoma with Mboma at the Sam Nujoma Foundation, Walvis Bay, in 2021

On 27 March, the 18-year-old improved to 50.97 s and won the 400 m race at the Grand Prix Meet in Oshakati, Namibia. On 11 April, at the All Comers Meet in Lusaka, Zambia, she massively lowered her PB to 49.24 s. She set the Namibian senior and unofficial world under-20 record, breaking previous WU20R mark of 49.42, which was set in 1991 by Gritt Breuer. Beatrice Masilingi came second in 49.53 s. A week later, on 17 April, at the Namibian Championships in Windhoek, Mboma took 0.2 s off her record, stopping the clock at 49.22 s. The next day, the women's 4 × 100 m relay team set the Namibian record at 44.78 s. On 7 June, Mboma set new PB, Namibian and a meet record of 22.67 s in the 200 m at the Josef Odložil Memorial in Prague to take a gold medal.

On 30 June, Mboma set an unratified African senior and new world U20 record in the 400 m greatly lowering her PB even further. She timed 48.54 seconds to break the 49.10 s 1996's mark of Falilat Ogunkoya-Osheku and win the Irena Szewińska Memorial in Bydgoszcz, Poland, becoming the 7th fastest woman of all time in the event with the 12th fastest result ever.

She was withdrawn from the 400 metres race at the delayed 2020 Tokyo Olympics; the Namibian athletics federation announced that she would compete in the 200 m event for which she also qualified. In the 200 m final on 3 August 2021, Mboma won a silver medal, coming in 0.28 seconds behind winner Elaine Thompson-Herah. She became the first Namibian woman ever to win an Olympic medal and the first Namibian medallist since 1996. On 3 September 2021, she won the 200 m event during her debut Diamond League race in Brussels. She concluded her very successful season with a win on 9 September at the Diamond League final in Zürich, clocking 21.78 s to take her first Diamond Trophy. In the process, she also set a new World under 20 and African record by breaking her own record from the Olympics by 0.03 seconds.

Following her record-breaking season, Mboma was awarded the BBC African Sports Personality of the Year award. She also won the Confederation of African Athletics (CAA) African Female Hope Athlete award beating competition from Kenya's Jackline Chepkoech, and Nigeria's Tobi Amusan and Imaobong Uko.

==== 2022 ====
Mboma opened up the season on 15 January with a 11.25 s 100 m performance in Swakopmund.

She became a brand ambassador for Marathon Sugar in 2022.

=== Testosterone levels controversy ===
In July 2021, the Namibian National Olympic Committee announced that Mboma and fellow Namibian sprinter Beatrice Masilingi would not be allowed to compete in the 400 m competition at the Tokyo Olympics, due to World Athletics rules requiring that athletes with certain DSDs participating in women's running events from 400 metres to one mile cannot have blood testosterone levels above 5 nmol/L. Mboma and Masilingi had undergone a medical assessment at a training camp in Italy in early 2021, at which they tested positive for elevated testosterone levels due to a naturally occurring genetic condition. Both sprinters had been unaware of the condition prior to the evaluation.

Parallels were drawn between Mboma and Masilingi and South African middle-distance runner Caster Semenya, who was the most prominent athlete to be affected by the World Athletics 2018 rule change, and who also did not participate in the 2020 Olympics. The controversy around Mboma's withdrawal centered on the fact that the 2018 rule on testosterone levels explicitly applies to intersex athletes with DSDs such as Semenya, while Abner Xoagub, president of the Namibia National Olympic Committee, at first said in a voice clip that Mboma and Masilingi "have XX chromosomes." The World Athletics regulations in question, however, apply only to athletes with an XY karyotype and a DSD diagnosis, casting doubt on Xoagub's statement. Xoagub also accused World Athletics of breaking a confidentiality agreement concerning the results of the initial medical assessment. Prior to the 2020 Olympics, the Namibia NOC issued an official statement acknowledging the assessment of World Athletics while stating that the athletes had previously been unaware of their condition.

She was one of the athletes whose cases were profiled in Phyllis Ellis's 2022 documentary film Category: Woman.

== Achievements ==
All information taken from World Athletics profile.

=== Personal bests ===
Event	Time (s)	Wind	Venue	Date	Notes
100 metres	10.97	+1.6 m/s	Gaborone, Botswana	30 April 2022	
200 metres	21.78	+0.6 m/s	Zürich, Switzerland	9 September 2021	World under-20 record (21.81) (Note: Mboma's 21.81 seconds mark from the Tokyo Games was ratified as the world u20 record. Her 21.78 s result from the Diamond League final in Zürich was recognized as an "only" African record due to lack of doping control.) African record
400 metres	49.22		Windhoek, Namibia	17 April 2021	(also 48.54 s not recognised)
800 metres	2:03.27		Lusaka, Zambia	10 April 2021	A
4 × 100 m relay	43.76		Nairobi, Kenya	22 August 2021	A NU20R NR

=== International competitions ===
Representing Namibia
Year	Competition	Venue	Position	Event	Time	Notes
2021	Olympic Games	Tokyo, Japan	2nd	200 m	21.81	(+0.8 m/s) WU20R AR
2021	World U20 Championships	Nairobi, Kenya	1st	200 m	21.84	(+1.1 m/s) CR
2021	World U20 Championships	Nairobi, Kenya	2nd	4 × 100 m	43.76	NU20R NR
2022	Commonwealth Games	Birmingham, United Kingdom	3rd	200 m	22.80	

=== Circuit wins and titles ===
- Diamond League champion 200 m: 2021
  - 2021 200 m: Brussels Memorial Van Damme (21.84), Zürich Weltklasse (21.78 AU20R AR)
- World Continental Tour
  - 2021 (400 m): Gold level–Bydgoszcz Irena Szewińska Memorial
  - 2021 (200 m): Bronze level–Prague Josef Odložil Memorial, Silver level–Madrid Meeting

=== Season's bests ===
Year	400 m	Notes	200 m	Notes	100 m	Notes
2020	51.57	A, PB	25.05		–	
2021	49.22	48.54 unratified	21.78	WU20R AR	–	
