= Favour Ofili =

Nigerian sprinter (born 2002)

Personal information
- Full name: Favour Chukwuka Ofili
- Nickname: Star Girl
- Born: 31 December 2002 (age 23) Port Harcourt, Rivers, Nigeria
- Education: University of Port Harcourt; Louisiana State University
- Height: 1.7 m (5 ft 7 in)

Sport
- Country: Nigeria
- Sport: Track and field
- Event: Sprints
- College team: LSU Lady Tigers (2021)

Achievements and titles
- Personal bests: 100 m: 10.87 (2025); 150 m: 15.85 WR (2025); 200 m: 21.96 NR (2022); 60 m (i): 7.15 (2023); 200 m (i): 22.11 AR (2023)
Medal record
Women's athletics
Representing Nigeria
Commonwealth Games
Silver medal – second place	2022 Birmingham	200 m
African Games
Gold medal – first place	2019 Rabat	4×400m relay
Silver medal – second place	2019 Rabat	400 m
World U20 Championships
Gold medal – first place	2021 Nairobi	4x400m relay
Bronze medal – third place	2021 Nairobi	200 m
Bronze medal – third place	2021 Nairobi	4x100m relay
African Youth Games
Gold medal – first place	2018 Algiers	400 m
African Youth Championships
Gold medal – first place	2019 Abidjan	200 m
Gold medal – first place	2019 Abidjan	400 m

Favour Ofili (born 31 December 2002) is a Nigerian sprinter who competes in the 100 m, 200 m and 4x100 m relay. Ofili made her Olympic debut in women's 200m at the 2024 Paris Olympics, where she finished sixth in the finals.

She won a silver medal for the 400 metres at the 2019 African Games. Ofili won silver for the 200 metres at the 2022 Commonwealth Games. She was the 2021 World Under-20 Championship bronze medallist in the 200 m.

Ofili is the African indoor record holder in the 200 m event and holds a Nigerian record (also at U20 level) over the distance with a time of 21.96 seconds, making her the first Nigerian woman in history (and second African woman) to break the 22-second barrier. She also ran 10.93 seconds in the 100 m in April 2022, becoming the first female NCAA athlete to run sub 11s and sub 22s.

Ofili is the current 150 m world record holder having broken the world record on 17th May 2025 at the Adidas Atlanta City Games in a time of 15.85s. By so doing, she also became the first woman ever to run 150 metres in under 16 seconds breaking Shaunae Miller-Uibo's previous record of 16.23s. In 2025, she attempted to switch her sporting allegiance to Turkey, but the move was blocked by World Athletics.

== Career ==
=== Early career ===
Favour Ofili began athletics in 2014 while in high school in Delta State, Nigeria. Her high school coach, Anne Otutu, helped ignite a firm belief in her talent. She later trained in Port Harcourt with coach George Obiano until she moved to the United States.

=== 2019 ===
Ofili was named the female athlete of the meet at the 2019 African Under-18 Championships after winning the 200 and 400 metres with new personal bests in both. Still 16, she represented her country at the World Relays in Yokohama a month later, running in the 4 × 100 m and 4 × 400 m relays. She won the 200 m and finished second behind Patience George in the 400 m at the Nigerian Championships in July, running under 52 seconds at the longer event for the first time. Ofili bettered this mark at the African Games a month later, finishing second with 51.68 s and qualifying for the World Athletics Championships in Doha. She also anchored the Nigerian team (Kemi Francis, Patience George and Blessing Oladoye) to a gold medal in the women's 4 x 400 m relay at the Games. This secured a second senior medal for the young athlete. As the youngest athlete at the World Championships in September, she improved her 400 m personal best to 51.51 s but was eliminated in the semi-finals.

=== 2020–2021 ===
Ofili earned a scholarship at the Louisiana State University (USA) in 2020, after her performance at the 2019 World Championships, which caught the attention of sprint coach Dennis Shaver, who became her personal coach. On 27 February 2021, she set an African indoor record in the 200 m with a time of 22.75 s at the SEC Indoor Championship in Fayetteville, Arkansas.

Despite having qualified for the 2020 Summer Olympics, Ofili was ruled out of Tokyo 2020 after arriving in Japan due to the Nigerian federation failing to ensure they met the minimum drug-testing requirements. Nine other athletes were also disqualified. She was able to participate at the World U20 Championships a few weeks later in Nairobi, where she won bronze in the 200 m and two medals for relays, with her mark in her individual event being the third-fastest ever by a U20 woman.

=== 2022 ===
In February 2022, Ofili outdid her African indoor 200 m record three times, improving it ultimately to 22.46 s. She held the NCAA collegiate record in the outdoor event with her time of 21.96 s set on 15 April that year, until Abby Steiner broke the record two months later. Ofili's mark set at the Tom Jones Memorial Invitational in Gainesville, Florida surpassed 14-year-old Blessing Okagbare's Nigerian record and was also an African record at the time.

=== 2023 ===
She became the second-fastest indoor 200 m runner in collegiate history (after Abby Steiner) in February 2023, setting an African indoor record of 22.36 s at the Tyson Invitational in Fayetteville, Arkansas. In December 2023, Ofili graduated with a bachelor's degree in Sport and Fitness Administration/Management from Louisiana State University (USA). Following college, Ofili signed a sponsorship with Adidas.

=== 2024 ===
==== 2024 Paris Olympics ====
Ofili made her Olympic finals debut in the 200m at the Paris 2024 games finishing in 6th position with a time of 22.24 seconds Ofili was also part of Nigerian team in the 4 × 100 m relay where they achieved a season-best time of 42.70s, but did not proceed past the heats.

Ofili intended to participate in the 100 m event. However, due to administrative errors by the Athletics Federation of Nigeria, her name was not submitted and she was unable to take part. After an investigation that took place following the games, it was recommended that Ofili should be compenstated ₦8,000,000 for "the disappointment and depression she experienced due to her omission from the event."

Following the Olympics, the Athletics Federation of Nigeria accused Ofili of being an uncontrollable athlete after rumours of her changing her nationality surfaced online.

== Statistics ==
=== Circuit performances ===
Grand Slam Track results
Slam	Race group	Event	Pl.	Time	Prize money
2025 Miami Slam	Short sprints	100 m	3rd	10.94	US$25,000
2025 Miami Slam	Short sprints	200 m	4th	22.27	US$25,000

=== International competitions ===
Representing Nigeria
Year	Competition	Venue	Position	Event	Time
2018	African Youth Games	Algiers, Algeria	1st	400 m	53.57
2018	Youth Olympic Games	Buenos Aires, Argentina	10th	400 m	tot. 1:53.02
2019	African U18 Championships	Abidjan, Ivory Coast	1st	200 m	23.38 CR
2019	African U18 Championships	Abidjan, Ivory Coast	1st	400 m	52.28 CR
2019	World Relays	Yokohama, Japan	17th (h)	4 × 100 m relay	45.07 SB
2019	World Relays	Yokohama, Japan	18th (h)	4 × 400 m relay	3:32.10 SB
2019	African Games	Rabat, Morocco	2nd	400 m	51.68
2019	African Games	Rabat, Morocco	1st	4 × 400 m relay	3:30.32
2019	World Championships	Doha, Qatar	21st (sf)	400 m	52.58
2019	World Championships	Doha, Qatar	15th (h)	4 × 400 m relay	3:35.90
2021	World U20 Championships	Nairobi, Kenya	3rd	200 m	22.23 NU20R
2021	World U20 Championships	Nairobi, Kenya	3rd	4 × 100 m relay	43.90 SB
2021	World U20 Championships	Nairobi, Kenya	1st	4 × 400 m relay	3:31.46 WU20L
2022	World Championships	Eugene, OR, United States	10th (sf)	200 m	22.30
2022	World Championships	Eugene, OR, United States	4th	4 × 100 m relay	42.22 AR
2022	Commonwealth Games	Birmingham, United Kingdom	2nd	200 m	22.51
2022	Commonwealth Games	Birmingham, United Kingdom	1st	4 × 100 m relay	42.10 AR
2023	World Championships	Budapest, Hungary	18th (sf)	200 m	22.86
2023	World Championships	Budapest, Hungary	–	4 × 100 m relay	DNF
2024	African Championships	Douala, Cameroon	2nd (h)	100 m	11.22^{1}
2024	Paris Olympics	Paris, France	6th	200 m	22.24
2024	Paris Olympics	Paris, France	9th	4 × 100 m relay	42.70

^{1}Did not start in the semifinals

=== National titles ===
- 200 meters: 2019
- 4 × 400 m relay: 2021
- 4 × 400 m mixed: 2021

=== Personal bests ===
- 60 metres indoor – 7.15 (Fayetteville, AR 2023)

- 100 metres – 10.93 (+2.0 m/s, Baton Rouge, LA 2022)
- 150 metres - 15.85 (2.0 m/s, Atlanta, GA 2025) WR
- 200 metres – 21.96 (+1.3 m/s, Gainesville, FL 2022) NR
- 200 metres U20 – 22.23 (+1.1 m/s, Nairobi 2021) NU20R
  - 200 metres indoor – 22.11 (Albuquerque, NM 2023) AR
- 400 metres – 51.49 (Baton Rouge, LA 2021)
