= 2021 World Athletics U20 Championships – Women's 4 × 400 metres relay =

Women's 4 × 400 metres relay at the 2021 World Athletics U20 Championships
- Venue: Kasarani Stadium
- Dates: 22 August
- Competitors: 32 from 8 nations
- Winning time: 3:31.46

Medalists
gold medal	Opeyemi Deborah Oke; Imaobong Nse Uko; Ella Onojuvwevwo; Favour Ofili	Nigeria
silver medal	Annalee Robinson; Aalliyah Francis; Alliah Baker; Daena Dyer	Jamaica
bronze medal	Alessandra Iezzi; Federica Pansini; Angelica Ghergo; Alexandra Almici	Italy

The women's 4 × 400 metres relay at the 2021 World Athletics U20 Championships was held at the Kasarani Stadium on 22 August.

== Records ==
Standing records prior to the 2021 World Athletics U20 Championships
World U20 Record	United States	3:27.60	Grosseto, Italy	18 July 2004
Championship Record	United States	3:27.60	Grosseto, Italy	18 July 2004
World U20 Leading	Germany	3:35.38	Tallinn, Estonia	18 July 2021

== Results ==
The final was held on 22 August at 17:55.

Rank	Nation	Athletes	Time	Notes
1st place, gold medalist(s)	Nigeria	Opeyemi Deborah Oke, Imaobong Nse Uko, Ella Onojuvwevwo, Favour Ofili	3:31.46	WU20L
2nd place, silver medalist(s)	Jamaica	Annalee Robinson, Aalliyah Francis, Alliah Baker, Daena Dyer	3:36.57	SB
3rd place, bronze medalist(s)	Italy	Alessandra Iezzi, Federica Pansini, Angelica Ghergo, Alexandra Almici	3:37.18	
4	India	Payal Vohra, Summy, Rajitha Kunja, Priya Mohan	3:40.45	SB
5	Czech Republic	Nikola Bišová, Karolína Mitanová, Kateřina Matoušková, Lucie Zavadilová	3:41.59	
6	South Africa	Precious Molepo, Angelique Strydom, Charlize Eilerd, Jada van Staden	3:43.16	SB
7	Ethiopia	Amarech Zago, Hana Tadesse, Meheret Ashamo, Nigist Getachew	3:43.37	SB
8	Slovenia	Eva Murn, Veronika Sadek, Neža Dolenc, Petja Klojčnik	3:49.36	
