= Shinyungwe =

- Settlement
- Location in Namibia
- Coordinates: 18°01′32″S 20°53′35″E
- Country: Namibia
- Region: Kavango East
- Time zone: UTC+2 (South African Standard Time)

Shinyungwe is a settlement that is situated 130 miles (210 km) east of Rundu in the Kavango East region of Namibia.

Shinyungwe Combined School is located at the village. Namibian athlete Christine Mboma is from Shinyungwe.
