= 2021 World Athletics U20 Championships – Women's 4 × 100 metres relay =

Women's 4 × 100 metres relay at the 2021 World Athletics U20 Championships
- Venue: Kasarani Stadium
- Dates: 22 August
- Competitors: 32 from 8 nations
- Winning time: 42.94

Medalists
| gold medal | Serena Cole; Tina Clayton; Kerrica Hill; Tia Clayton | Jamaica |
| silver medal | Ndawana Haitembu; Beatrice Masilingi; Nandi Tjanjeua Vass; Christine Mboma | Namibia |
| bronze medal | Praise Ofoku; Favour Ofili; Anita Taviore; Tima Seikeseye Godbless | Nigeria |

The women's 4 × 100 metres relay at the 2021 World Athletics U20 Championships was held at the Kasarani Stadium on 22 August.

== Records ==
Standing records prior to the 2021 World Athletics U20 Championships
| World U20 Record | Germany | 43.27 | Grosseto, Italy | 23 July 2017 |
| Championship Record | Jamaica | 43.40 | Kingston, Jamaica | 21 July 2002 |
| World U20 Leading | United States | 43.71 | Austin, United States | 27 March 2021 |

== Results ==
The final was held on 22 August at 16:32.

| Rank | Lane | Nation | Athletes | Time | Notes |
|---|---|---|---|---|---|
| 1st place, gold medalist(s) | 5 | Jamaica | Serena Cole, Tina Clayton, Kerrica Hill, Tia Clayton | 42.94 | WU20R |
| 2nd place, silver medalist(s) | 2 | Namibia | Ndawana Haitembu, Beatrice Masilingi, Nandi Tjanjeua Vass, Christine Mboma | 43.76 | NU20R NR |
| 3rd place, bronze medalist(s) | 4 | Nigeria | Praise Ofoku, Favour Ofili, Anita Taviore, Tima Seikeseye Godbless | 43.90 | SB |
| 4 | 3 | Poland | Dorota Puzio, Monika Romaszko, Marta Zimna, Magdalena Niemczyk | 44.31 | NU20R |
| 5 | 7 | Czech Republic | Eva Kubíčková, Tereza Lamačová, Barbora Šplechtnová, Lucie Mičunková | 44.35 | NU20R |
| 6 | 1 | South Africa | Marione Fourie, Charlize Eilerd, Kayla La Grange, Viwe Jingqi | 45.05 | NU20R |
| | 8 | Finland | Tanja Kokkonen, Anna Pursiainen, Johanna Kylmänen, Sonja Stång | DNF | |
| | 6 | Italy | Gaya Bertello, Elisa Visentin, Alessandra Iezzi, Arianna Battistella | DQ | TR24.7 |
