= List of Namibian records in athletics =

The following are the national records in athletics in Namibia maintained by Namibia's national athletics federation, Athletics Namibia (AN).

== Outdoor ==
Key to tables: Awaiting ratification Record not kept by AN Not ratified or later rescinded by AN

=== Men ===
Event	Record	Athlete	Date	Meet	Place	Ref.
100 m	9.86 (−0.4 m/s)	Frankie Fredericks	3 July 1996	Athletissima	Lausanne, Switzerland	
150 m (bend)	14.99+ (+0.3 m/s)	Frankie Fredericks	20 August 1993	World Championships	Stuttgart, Germany	
200 m	19.68 (+0.4 m/s)	Frankie Fredericks	1 August 1996	Olympic Games	Atlanta, United States	
300 m	32.68	Gideon Ernst Narib	17 October 2020	Narib Golden Spikes GP 1	Windhoek, Namibia	
400 m	45.80 A	Mahmad Bock	30 April 2022		Gaborone, Botswana	
800 m	1:46.62	Daniel Nghipandulwa	10 April 2011	Yellow Pages South African Championships	Durban, South Africa	
1500 m	3:45.35	Reinholdt Iita	5 June 1998		Kotka, Finland	
3000 m	8:13.86	Ruben Indongo	9 June 2004		Saint-Maur, France	
5000 m	13:46.91	Luketz Swartbooi	12 March 1994		Fullerton, United States	
5 km (road)	14:04	Luketz Swartbooi	2 April 1995	Carlsbad 5000	Carlsbad, United States	
10,000 m	28:38.2 h	Mynhardt Mbeumuna Kauanivi	9 April 2016		Swakopmund, Namibia	
10 km (road)	27:51	Luketz Swartbooi	26 March 1994		Mobile, United States	
15 km (road)	42:44	Luketz Swartbooi	26 February 1994		Tampa, United States	
10 miles (road)	47:47	Luketz Swartbooi	8 April 1995	Trevira Twosome	New York City, United States	
20 km (road)	59:05	Ruben Indongo	12 October 2008		Paris, France	
Half marathon	1:01:10	Daniel Paulus	4 June 2022	Nelson Mandela Bay Half Marathon	Gqeberha, South Africa	
Marathon	2:09:08 a dh	Luketz Swartbooi	18 April 1994	Boston Marathon	Boston, United States	
Marathon	2:08:40	Daniel Paulus	2 April 2023	Daegu Marathon	Daegu, South Korea	
110 m hurdles	14.12 NWI	Flip Bredenhann	19 November 1980		Sasolburg, South Africa	
400 m hurdles	49.05	Willie Smith	16 March 2001		Roodepoort, South Africa	
400 m hurdles	49.05	Willie Smith	5 April 2002		Germiston, South Africa	
3000 m steeplechase	9:31.23	Frank Tuihaleni Kayele	19 June 1992		Windhoek, Namibia	
High jump	2.18 m	Max Schäfer	16 April 1988		Bloemfontein, South Africa	
Pole vault	4.84 m	Johan Mostert	25 February 1984		Windhoek, South West Africa	
Long jump	8.24 m A (+0.4 m/s)	Stephan Louw	12 January 2008		Germiston, South Africa	
Long jump	8.27 m A (+0.7 m/s)	Chenault Lionel Coetzee	15 April 2023	Namibian Championships	Windhoek, Namibia	
Triple jump	16.78 m A (+0.8 m/s)	Roger Haitengi	13 February 2016	Nkwalu Invitational	Johannesburg, South Africa	
Shot put	17.10 m	Derreck Wiggill	19 April 1969		Bloemfontein, South Africa	
Shot put	18.09 m	Cornelius Coenraad Kuhn	25 January 2025	Swakopmund, Namibia	Athletics Namibia Grand Prix 1	
Discus throw	61.15 m	Ryan Williams	26 April 2023	ASA Athletics Grand Prix 3	Potchefstroom, South Africa	
Hammer throw	52.78 m	Walter Mostert	23 January 1982		Windhoek, South West Africa	
Javelin throw	78.32 m A	Strydom van der Wath	9 May 2015	South African Open Championships	Potchefstroom, South Africa	
Decathlon	6647 pts	Timon Dresselhaus	14–15 May 2021	Southland Conference Championships	Humble, United States	
Decathlon	100m / Long jump / Shot put / High jump / 400m / 110m H / Discus / Pole vault / Javelin / 1500m; 11.36 (+0.7 m/s) / 6.36 m (−1.2 m/s) / 12.24 m / 1.90 m / 51.39 / 15.09 (+0.1 m/s) / 40.09 m / 4.00 m / 41.24 m / 5:05.30 (Note: by result source; 5:05.36 by World Athletics source)					
20 km walk (road)	1:42:05	Elvin Alberts	1 July 1995		Windhoek, Namibia	
50 km walk (road)						
4 × 100 m relay	39.22	Namibia; Even Tjiviju; Hitjivirue Kaanjuka; Dantago Gurirab; Jesse Urikhob	15 September 2015	African Games	Brazzaville, Republic of the Congo	
4 × 400 m relay	3:07.83 A	Namibia; Thasiso Auchamub; Warren Goreseb; Ernst Narib; Mahmad Bock	27 April 2019	International Meet	Gaborone, Botswana	

=== Women ===
Event	Record	Athlete	Date	Meet	Place	Ref.
60 m	7.57 (+1.0 m/s)	Keshia Kalomo	30 January 2016		Kingston, Jamaica	
100 m	10.97 A (+1.6 m/s)	Christine Mboma	30 April 2022	Gaborone International Meet	Gaborone, Botswana	
200 m	21.78 (+0.6 m/s)	Christine Mboma	9 September 2021	Weltklasse Zürich	Zürich, Switzerland	
300 m	34.60 A	Beatrice Masilingi	18 February 2023	Curro Simbine Classic Shoot Out	Pretoria, South Africa	
400 m	49.22 A	Christine Mboma	17 April 2021	Namibian Championships	Windhoek, Namibia	
400 m	48.54 (Note: irregular)	Christine Mboma	30 June 2021	Irena Szewińska Memorial	Bydgoszcz, Poland	
800 m	1:59.15	Agnes Samaria	29 July 2002	Commonwealth Games	Manchester, United Kingdom	
1000 m	2:34.19	Agnes Samaria	30 August 2002	Memorial Van Damme	Brussels, Belgium	
1500 m	4:05.30	Agnes Samaria	29 July 2008	Herculis	Fontvieille, Monaco	
Mile	4:25.01	Agnes Samaria	14 September 2007	Memorial Van Damme	Brussels, Belgium	
3000 m	9:21.58	Beata Naigambo	3 May 2005		Windhoek, Namibia	
3000 m	9:20.34 (Note: not ratified by Athletics Namibia, but recognised by World Athletics)	Beata Naigambo	14 January 2012	Bank Windhoek Grand Prix	Windhoek, Namibia	
5000 m	15:14.23	Helalia Johannes	24 October 2019	Military World Games	Wuhan, China	
5 km (road)	16:36+	Helalia Johannes	6 December 2020	Valencia Marathon	Valencia, Spain	
10,000 m	33:42.19	Elizabeth Mongudhi	25 July 1999		Windhoek, Namibia	
10 km (road)	30:59	Helalia Johannes	23 June 2019	Spar Grand Prix Series 10K	Durban, South Africa	
15 km (road)	49:14+	Helalia Johannes	6 December 2020	Valencia Marathon	Valencia, Spain	
20 km (road)	1:07:37+	Helalia Johannes	10 March 2019	Nagoya Women's Marathon	Nagoya, Japan	
Half marathon	1:07:49	Helalia Johannes	4 June 2022	Nelson Mandela Bay Half Marathon	Gqeberha, South Africa	
25 km (road)	1:21:48+	Helalia Johannes	6 December 2020	Valencia Marathon	Valencia, Spain	
30 km (road)	1:38:31+	Helalia Johannes	6 December 2020	Valencia Marathon	Valencia, Spain	
Marathon	2:19:52	Helalia Johannes	6 December 2020	Valencia Marathon	Valencia, Spain	
100 m hurdles	14.34 A (+1.2 m/s)	Steffi van Wyk	27 April 2012		Johannesburg, South Africa	
100 m hurdles	14.10 A NWI	Mercia Venter	18 March 2016	Varsity Athletics Meeting	Johannesburg, South Africa	
400 m hurdles	58.68	Lilanne Klaasman	17 September 2015	All-Africa Games	Brazzaville, Republic of the Congo	
3000 m steeplechase	11:17.84 A	Shiivomwene Shilongo	28 April 2012		Windhoek, Namibia	
High jump	1.82 m A	Orla Venter	30 April 1993		Gaborone, Botswana	
Pole vault	2.30 m A	Chenè de Wet	6 April 2013	Top 10 Club Championships	Windhoek, Namibia	
Long jump	6.05 m A NWI	Ronel Moolman	9 April 1994		Windhoek, Namibia	
Triple jump	12.11 m A NWI	Frieda Iithete	1 April 2022		Windhoek, Namibia	
Shot put	15.24 m A	Tuane Silver	9 February 2022		Pretoria, South Africa	
Shot put	17.11 m	Tuane Silver	23 May 2024	NCAA Division I West First Rounds	Fayetteville, United States	
Discus throw	49.98 m	Charlene Engelbrecht	21 April 2014		Stellenbosch, South Africa	
Hammer throw	38.57 m A	Karlien Botha	20/21 April 2018		Windhoek, Namibia	
Javelin throw	49.41 m A	Daria Smith	1 June 2002		Windhoek, Namibia	
Heptathlon	4844 pts	Corlia Kruger	24–25 April 2015	USSA Championships	Stellenbosch, South Africa	
Heptathlon	100m H / High jump / Shot put / 200m / Long jump / Javelin / 800m; 14.81 (−0.2 m/s) / 1.67 m / 9.94 m / 26.49 (−0.9 m/s) / 5.52 m (+1.5 m/s) / 31.87 m / 2:32.67					
Heptathlon	5069 pts A (Note: no details available for a conversion from 1971 tables to 1984 tables)	Santie Binneman	2–3 December 1983		Windhoek, South West Africa	
Heptathlon	100m H / High jump / Shot put / 200m / Long jump / Javelin / 800m					
20 km walk (road)						
35 km walk (road)						
50 km walk (road)						
4 × 100 m relay	43.76 A	Namibia; Ndawana Haitembu; Beatrice Masilingi; Nandi Vass; Christine Mboma	22 August 2021	World U20 Championships	Nairobi, Kenya	
4 × 400 m relay	3:40.21	Namibia; Tjipekapora Herunga; Globine Mayova; Mberihonga Kandovasu; Lilianne Klaasman	3 May 2015	IAAF World Relays	Nassau, Bahamas	

=== Mixed ===
Event	Record	Athlete	Date	Meet	Place	Ref.
4 × 400 m relay	3:41.83 A	M. Bock; W. Goreseb; N. Vass; H. Fikunawa	12 March 2022		Windhoek, Namibia	
4 × 400 m relay	3:35.29	Namibia; Ivan Geldenhuys; Marry-Angel Khachas; Mervin Appolus; Mudi-Inosensia Haingura	29 April 2023	Botswana Golden Grand Prix	Gaborone, Botswana	
4 × 400 m relay	3:30.00	Namibia	19 March 2024	African Games	Accra, Ghana	

== Indoor ==
=== Men ===
Event	Record	Athlete	Date	Meet	Place	Ref.
50 m	5.71	Frankie Fredericks	29 January 1995		Grenoble, France	
55 m	6.13 A	Frankie Fredericks	30 January 1993		Provo, United States	
60 m	6.51	Frankie Fredericks	12 March 1993	World Championships	Toronto, Canada	
100 m	10.05	Frankie Fredericks	12 February 1996		Tampere, Finland	
200 m	19.92	Frankie Fredericks	18 February 1996	Meeting Pas de Calais	Liévin, France	
300 m	32.36	Frankie Fredericks	28 February 2003		Karlsruhe, Germany	
400 m	47.35	Dasheek Akwenye	16 February 2008		Nampa, United States	
800 m	1:51.27 A	Mao Tjiroze	2 February 2002		Pocatello, United States	
1000 m	3:01.28 (Note: record set during heptathlon competition)	Timon Dresselhaus	25 February 2020		Birmingham, United States	
1500 m						
3000 m	8:24.59 A	Luketz Swartbooi	10 February 1995		Pocatello, United States	
55 m hurdles		Timon Dresselhaus	13 December 2020	ASU Kickoff Klassic	Jonesboro, United States	
60 m hurdles	8.45	Timon Dresselhaus	18 January 2020	Samford Indoor Clash	Birmingham, United States	
60 m hurdles	8.45	Timon Dresselhaus	16 January 2021	Arkansas Invitational	Fayetteville, United States	
60 m hurdles	8.36	Timon Dresselhaus	11 February 2022	7th Annual Indoor Gorilla Classic	Pittsburgh, United States	
High jump	2.08 m	Johannes Blaauw	27 January 2018		Ancona, Italy	
Pole vault	4.20 m (Note: record set during heptathlon competition)	Timon Dresselhaus	1 March 2021	Southland Conference Championships	Birmingham, United States	
Long jump	7.88 m	Stephan Louw	27 February 2004		Chemnitz, Germany	
Triple jump						
Shot put	13.19 m (Note: record set during heptathlon competition)	Timon Dresselhaus	24 February 2019	Southland Conference Championships	Birmingham, United States	
Heptathlon	4980 pts	Timon Dresselhaus	24–25 February 2019	Southland Conference Championships	Birmingham, United States	
Heptathlon	60m / Long jump / Shot put / High jump / 60m H / Pole vault / 1000m; 7.21 / 6.51 m / 13.19 m / 1.85 m / 8.65 / 4.10 m / 3:01.28					
5000 m walk						
4 × 400 m relay						

=== Women ===
Event	Record	Athlete	Date	Meet	Place	Ref.
60 m	7.46	Jolene Jacobs	9 February 2020	Midland Championships	Birmingham, United Kingdom	
200 m	26.77	L. van Rensburg	27 February 1999		Birmingham, United Kingdom	
200 m	25.71 OT	Danica van Wyk	4 February 2006		Lubbock, United States	
400 m	55.40	Tjipekapora Herunga	12 March 2010	World Championships	Doha, Qatar	
800 m	1:59.91	Agnes Samaria	15 February 2005		Stockholm, Sweden	
1000 m	2:36.99	Agnes Samaria	18 February 2005	Norwich Union Indoor Grand Prix	Birmingham, United Kingdom	
1500 m						
3000 m						
60 m hurdles	9.41 (Note: record set during pentathlon competition)	Natalie Louw	28 February 2021		Birmingham, United States	
High jump	1.65 m (Note: record set during pentathlon competition)	Natalie Louw	28 February 2021		Birmingham, United States	
Pole vault						
Long jump	5.41 m (Note: record set during pentathlon competition)	Natalie Louw	28 February 2021		Birmingham, United States	
Triple jump	10.61 m	Angelicque Rall	12 March 2004	World Masters Championships	Sindelfingen, Germany	
Shot put	11.76 m (Note: record set during pentathlon competition)	Natalie Louw	28 February 2021		Birmingham, United States	
Pentathlon	3339 pts	Natalie Louw	28 February 2021		Birmingham, United States	
Pentathlon	60m H / High jump / Shot put / Long jump / 800m; 9.41 / 1.65m / 11.76m / 5.41m / 2:56.46					
3000 m walk						
4 × 400 m relay						
