= 2021 World Athletics U20 Championships =

Sports competition in Nairobi, Kenya

- Host city: Nairobi, Kenya
- Nations: 116 National Associations
- Athletes: 958
- Events: 45
- Dates: 18–22 August 2021
- Opened by: Uhuru Kenyatta
- Main venue: Moi International Sports Center, Kasarani

The 2021 World Athletics U20 Championships, also known as the World Junior Championships, was an international athletics competition for athletes qualifying as juniors (born no earlier than 1 January 2002), which was held from 18 to 22 August 2021 at the Moi International Sports Centre in Nairobi, Kenya.

== Schedule ==
Q	Qualification	H	Heats	S	Semifinals	F	Final
M = morning session, A = afternoon session

Men
Date →	18 Aug		19 Aug		20 Aug		21 Aug		22 Aug
Event ↓	M	A	M	A	M	A	M	A	A
100 m	H	S		F					
200 m					H	S		F	
400 m	H							F	
800 m			H					S	F
1500 m				H				F	
3000 m		F							
5000 m				F					
3000 m SC						H			F
110 m hurdles					H	S		F	
400 m hurdles			H					S	F
Decathlon					F				
High jump								F	
Pole vault					F				
Long jump						F			
Triple jump									F
Shot put	Q			F					
Discus throw							Q		F
Hammer throw	Q					F			
Javelin throw		Q				F			
10,000 m walk							F		
4 × 100 m relay							H		F
4 × 400 m relay							H		F

Women
Date →	18 Aug		19 Aug		20 Aug		21 Aug		22 Aug
Event ↓	M	A	M	A	M	A	M	A	A
100 m	H	S		F					
200 m					H	S		F	
400 m	H							F	
800 m			H			S		F	
1500 m					H				F
3000 m				F					
5000 m									F
3000 m SC						F			
100 m hurdles					H	S		F	
400 m hurdles			H						F
Heptathlon	F								
High jump					Q				F
Pole vault		F							
Long jump					Q				F
Triple jump				Q		F			
Shot put								F	
Discus throw					F				
Hammer throw					Q			F	
Javelin throw				F					
10,000 m walk							F		
4 × 100 m relay							H		F
4 × 400 m relay							H		F

Mixed
Date →	18 Aug		19 Aug		20 Aug		21 Aug		22 Aug
Event ↓	M	A	M	A	M	A	M	A	A
4 × 400 m relay	H	F							

Event schedule
DAY ONE—WEDNESDAY, AUGUST 18TH
Time (UTC+3)	DIVISION	EVENT	Round
09:00	X	4 × 400 Metres Relay	Heats
09:08	M	Hammer Throw (6 kg)	Qualification Group A
09:25	W	100 Metres Hurdles	Heptathlon
09:35	W	100 Metres	Heats
09:47	M	Shot Put (6 kg)	Qualification
10:15	W	High Jump	Heptathlon
10:20	M	100 Metres	Heats
10:25	M	Hammer Throw (6 kg)	Qualification Group B
11:15	W	400 Metres	Heats
11:40	M	400 Metres	Heats
16:00	W	Pole Vault	Final
16:05	W	Shot Put	Heptathlon
16:10	W	100 Metres	Semi-Final
16:14	M	Javelin Throw	Qualification Group A
16:40	M	100 Metres	Semi-Final
17:05	M	Javelin Throw	Qualification Group B
17:15	X	4 × 400 Metres Relay	Final
17:35	W	200 Metres	Heptathlon
17:45	M	3000 Metres	Final
END OF DAY ONE
DAY TWO—THURSDAY, AUGUST 19TH
09:00	W	400 Metres Hurdles	Heats
09:12	W	Long Jump	Heptathlon
09:25	M	400 Metres Hurdles	Heats
10:05	M	800 Metres	Heats
10:39	W	Javelin Throw	Heptathlon
10:50	W	800 Metres	Heats
14:40	W	Javelin Throw	Final
15:00	M	Pole Vault	Final
15:20	M	Shot Put (6 kg)	Final
15:40	M	1500 Metres	Heats
16:00	W	Triple Jump	Qualification
16:05	W	800 Metres	Heptathlon
16:25	W	Discus Throw	Final
16:30	M	5000 Metres	Final
17:00	W	3000 Metres	Final
17:30	W	100 Metres	Final
17:50	M	100 Metres	Final
END OF DAY TWO
DAY THREE—FRIDAY, AUGUST 20TH
09:00	M	100 Metres	Decathlon U20
09:10	W	Hammer Throw	Qualification Group A
09:15	W	100 Metres Hurdles	Heats
09:40	M	Long Jump	Decathlon U20
09:55	M	110 m Hurdles (99.0 cm)	Heats
10:00	W	Hammer Throw	Qualification Group B
10:13	W	High Jump	Qualification
10:30	W	1500 Metres	Heats
10:50	M	Shot Put (6 kg)	Decathlon U20
10:55	W	Long Jump	Qualification
11:00	W	200 Metres	Heats
11:40	M	200 Metres	Heats
14:20	M	Javelin Throw	Final
14:25	W	Triple Jump	Final
14:29	M	3000 Metres Steeplechase	Heats
15:05	W	100 Metres Hurdles	Semi-Final
15:17	M	High Jump	Decathlon U20
15:30	M	110 m Hurdles (99.0 cm)	Semi-Final
16:15	M	Hammer Throw (6 kg)	Final
16:20	W	800 Metres	Semi-Final
16:35	M	Long Jump	Final
16:40	W	200 Metres	Semi-Final
17:05	M	200 Metres	Semi-Final
17:35	M	400 Metres	Decathlon U20
18:05	W	3000 Metres Steeplechase	Final
END OF DAY THREE
DAY FOUR—SATURDAY, AUGUST 21ST
09:00	M	110 m Hurdles (99.0 cm)	Decathlon U20
09:15	M	10,000 Metres Race Walk	Final
09:50	M	Discus Throw (1.750 kg)	Decathlon U20
10:20	W	10,000 Metres Race Walk	Final
10:45	M	Discus Throw (1.750 kg)	Qualification Group A
11:22	W	4 × 400 Metres Relay	Heats
11:36	M	Discus Throw (1.750 kg)	Qualification Group B
11:50	M	Pole Vault	Decathlon U20
11:55	M	4 × 400 Metres Relay	Heats
12:20	W	4 × 100 Metres Relay	Heats
12:40	M	4 × 100 Metres Relay	Heats
15:00	M	400 Metres Hurdles	Semi-Final
15:05	M	Javelin Throw	Decathlon U20
15:30	M	800 Metres	Semi-Final
15:55	M	High Jump	Final
16:00	W	100 Metres Hurdles	Final
16:10	W	Hammer Throw	Final
16:15	M	110 m Hurdles (99.0 cm)	Final
16:30	M	1500 Metres	Final
16:40	W	Shot Put	Final
16:45	W	800 Metres	Final
17:00	W	400 Metres	Final
17:20	M	400 Metres	Final
17:45	M	1500 Metres	Decathlon U20
18:00	W	200 Metres	Final
18:10	M	200 Metres	Final
END OF DAY FOUR
DAY FIVE—SUNDAY, AUGUST 22ND
14:30	M	Triple Jump	Final
15:00	W	400 Metres Hurdles	Final
15:15	M	400 Metres Hurdles	Final
15:25	W	High Jump	Final
15:30	M	800 Metres	Final
15:50	W	1500 Metres	Final
16:00	M	Discus Throw (1.750 kg)	Final
16:05	M	3000 Metres Steeplechase	Final
16:25	W	Long Jump	Final
16:30	W	4 × 100 Metres Relay	Final
16:45	M	4 × 100 Metres Relay	Final
17:10	W	5000 Metres	Final
17:55	W	4 × 400 Metres Relay	Final
18:10	M	4 × 400 Metres Relay	Final
END OF DAY FIVE

== Qualifying Standards ==
Event	Men	Women
100 m	10.58	11.85
200 m	21.38	24.35
400 m	47.35	54.85
800 m	1:50.80	2:08.70
1500 m	3:48.00	4:28.00
3000 m	8:14.00	9:25.00
5000 m	14:12.00	16:35.00
3000 m sc	9:07.00	10:35.00
100 mH	–	14.15
110 mH	14.15	–
400 mH	53.10	60.75
10,000 m RW	43:40.00	50:30.00
4 × 100 m Relay	No standard	No standard
4 × 400 m Relay	No standard	No standard
4 × 400 m Mixed Relay	No standard	No standard
Heptathlon	–	5350 points
Decathlon	7100 points	–
High Jump	2.16 m (7 ft 1 in)	1.82 m (5 ft 11 1/2 in)
Pole Vault	5.10 m (16 ft 8 3/4 in)	4.07 m (13 ft 4 in)
Long Jump	7.58 m (24 ft 10 1/4 in)	6.15 m (20 ft 2 in)
Triple Jump	15.60 m (51 ft 2 in)	12.90 m (42 ft 3 3/4 in)
Shot Put	18.30 m (60 ft 1/4 in) (6 kg)	14.60 m (47 ft 10 3/4 in) (4 kg)
Discus	57.00 m (187 ft 0 in)	49.00 m (160 ft 9 in)
Hammer	68.50 m (224 ft 8 3/4 in) (6 kg)	58.00 m (190 ft 3 1/4 in)
Javelin	69.50 m (228 ft 0 in)	50.50 m (165 ft 8 in)

== Men's results ==
=== Track ===
Event	Gold		Silver		Bronze	
100 m	Letsile Tebogo; Botswana	10.19	Benjamin Richardson; South Africa	10.28	Shainer Reginfo; Cuba	10.32
200 m	Udodi Onwuzurike; Nigeria	20.21 NU20R	Letsile Tebogo; Botswana	20.38	Sinesipho Dambile; South Africa	20.48 SB
400 m	Anthony Pesela; Botswana	44.58 CR	Luis Avilés; Mexico	44.95 NU20R	Antonie Nortje; South Africa	45.32 PB
800 m	Emmanuel Wanyonyi; Kenya	1:43.76 CR	Mohamed Ali Gouaned; Algeria	1:44.45 NU20R	Noah Kibet; Kenya	1:44.88 PB
1500 m	Vincent Keter; Kenya	3:37.24	Wegene Addisu; Ethiopia	3:37.86	Melkeneh Azize; Ethiopia	3:40.22
3000 m	Tadese Worku; Ethiopia	7:42.09 CR	Ali Abdilmana; Ethiopia	7:44.55 PB	Habtom Samuel; Eritrea	7:52.69 PB
5000 m	Benson Kiplangat; Kenya	13:20.37 PB	Tadese Worku; Ethiopia	13:20.65	Levy Kibet; Kenya	13:26.01 PB
110 m hurdles (99.0 cm)	Sasha Zhoya; France	12.72 WU20R	Vashaun Vascianna; Jamaica	13.25 PB	Jakub Szymański; Poland	13.43 PB
400 m hurdles	Berke Akçam; Turkey	49.38 NU20R	Denis Novoseltsev; Authorised Neutral Athletes	49.62 PB	Devontie Archer; Jamaica	49.78 PB
400 m hurdles	Swedish Oskar Edlund originally arrived first, but was later disqualified for not clearing a hurdle properly.					
3000 m steeplechase	Amos Serem; Kenya	8:30.72	Tadese Takele; Ethiopia	8:33.15	Simon Koech; Kenya	8:34.79
4 × 100 m relay	South Africa; Mihlali Xhotyeni; Sinesipho Dambile; Letlhogonolo Moleyane; Benjamin Richardson; *Henru Olivier; *Bradley Oliphant	38.51 WU20R	Jamaica; Alexavier Monfried; Bryan Levell; Andrew Gilipps; Sandrey Davison	38.61 AU20R	Poland; Dominik Łuczynski; Patryk Krupa; Jakub Pietrusa; Oliwer Wdowik	38.90 AU20R
4 × 400 m relay	Botswana; Busang Collen Kebinatshipi; Anthony Pesela; Oreeditse Masede; Phenyo Bongani Majama; *Thusoyaone Gabanatlhong	3:05.22 WU20L	Jamaica; Malachi Johnson; Jeremy Bembridge; Tahj Hamm; Devontie Archer; *Antonio Hanson	3:05.76 SB	Kenya; Joshua Wanyonyi; Elkanah Kiprotich Chemelil; Kennedy Kimeu; Peter Kithome	3:05.94
10,000 m walk	Heristone Wanyonyi; Kenya	42:10.84 PB	Amit; India	42:17.94	Paul McGrath; Spain	42:26.11 PB

- WU20R (World U20 Record), WU20L (World U20 Leading), CR (Championships Record), AU20R (Area U20 Record), NU20R (National U20 Record), PB (Personal Best), SB (Season Best)

=== Field ===
Event	Gold		Silver		Bronze	
High jump	Yonathan Kapitolnik; Israel	2.26 PB	Massimiliano Luiu; Italy	2.17 PB	Mateusz Kołodziejski; Poland	2.17
Pole vault	Matvei Volkov; Belarus	5.45	Juho Alasaari; Finland	5.35	Kyle Rademeyer; South Africa	5.30
Long jump	Erwan Konaté; France	8.12 WU20L	Jhon Berrío; Colombia	7.97 NU20R	Kavian Kerr; Jamaica	7.90 PB
Triple jump	Gabriel Wallmark; Sweden	16.43 NU20R	Jaydon Hibbert; Jamaica	16.05 PB	Simon Gore; France	15.85 PB
Shot put (6 kg)	Juan Carley Vázquez; Cuba	19.73	Yauheni Bryhi; Belarus	19.70 PB	Jephté Vogel; Switzerland	19.16
Discus throw (1.750 kg)	Mykolas Alekna; Lithuania	69.81 CR	Ralford Mullings; Jamaica	66.68	Raman Khartanovich; Belarus	62.19
Hammer throw (6 kg)	Jan Doležálek; Czech Republic	77.83 NU20R	Orestis Dousakis; Greece	77.78	Jean-Baptiste Bruxelle; France	77.70
Javelin throw	Janne Läspä; Finland	76.46	Artur Felfner; Ukraine	76.32	Chinecherem Nnamdi; Nigeria	74.48
Decathlon (junior)	František Doubek; Czech Republic	8169 WU20L NU20R	Jente Hauttekeete; Belgium	8053	José San Pastor; Spain	7430 NU20R

- WU20R (World U20 Record), WU20L (World U20 Leading), CR (Championships Record), AU20R (Area U20 Record), NU20R (National U20 Record), PB (Personal Best), SB (Season Best)

== Women's results ==
=== Track ===
Event	Gold		Silver		Bronze	
100 m	Tina Clayton; Jamaica	11.09 PB	Beatrice Masilingi; Namibia	11.39	Mélissa Gutschmidt; Switzerland	11.51
200 m	Christine Mboma; Namibia	21.84 WU20R	Beatrice Masilingi; Namibia	22.18 PB	Favour Ofili; Nigeria	22.23 NU20R
400 m	Imaobong Nse Uko; Nigeria	51.55 PB	Kornelia Lesiewicz; Poland	51.97 PB	Sylvia Chelangat; Kenya	52.23 PB
800 m	Ayal Dagnachew; Ethiopia	2:02.96	Valentina Rosamilia; Switzerland	2:04.29	Elli Eftychia Deligianni; Greece	2:04.66
1500 m	Purity Chepkirui; Kenya	4:16.07	Diribe Welteji; Ethiopia	4:16.39	Winnie Jemutai; Kenya	4:18.99
3000 m	Teresia Muthoni Gateri; Kenya	8:57.78	Zenah Jemutai Yego; Kenya	8:59.59	Melknat Wudu; Ethiopia	9:00.12 PB
5000 m	Mizan Alem; Ethiopia	16:05.61	Melknat Wudu; Ethiopia	16:13.16	Prisca Chesang; Uganda	16:21.78
5000 m	Wudu and Chesang were originally disqualified for stepping out of the track, but after a protest, they were reinstated.					
100 m hurdles	Ackera Nugent; Jamaica	12.95	Anna Maria Millend; Estonia	13.45	Anna Tóth; Hungary	13.58
400 m hurdles	Heidi Salminen; Finland	56.94 PB	Ludivine Aubert; France	57.16 PB	Savannah Sutherland; Canada	57.27 PB
3000 m steeplechase	Jackline Chepkoech; Kenya	9:27.40 PB	Zerfe Wondemagegn; Ethiopia	9:35.22	Faith Cherotich; Kenya	9:44.76
4 × 100 m relay	Jamaica; Serena Cole; Tina Clayton; Kerrica Hill; Tia Clayton	42.94 WU20R	Namibia; Ndawana Haitembu; Beatrice Masilingi; Nandi Tjanjeua Vass; Christine Mboma	43.76 NU20R	Nigeria; Praise Ofoku; Favour Ofili; Anita Taviore; Tima Seikeseye Godbless	43.90 SB
4 × 400 m relay	Nigeria; Opeyemi Deborah Oke; Imaobong Nse Uko; Ella Onojuvwevwo; Favour Ofili	3:31.46 WU20L	Jamaica; Annalee Robinson; Aalliyah Francis; Alliah Baker; Daena Dyer	3:36.57 SB	Italy; Alessandra Iezzi; Federica Pansini; Angelica Ghergo; Alexandra Almici	3:37.18
10,000 m walk	Sofía Ramos Rodríguez; Mexico	46:23.01	Maële Biré-Heslouis; France	47:43.87	Eliška Martínková; Czech Republic	47:46.28

- WU20R (World U20 Record), WU20L (World U20 Leading), CR (Championships Record), AU20R (Area U20 Record), NU20R (National U20 Record), PB (Personal Best), SB (Season Best)

=== Field ===
Event	Gold		Silver		Bronze	
High jump	Natalya Spiridonova; Authorised Neutral Athletes	1.91	Marithé Engondo; Switzerland	1.89	Styliana Ioannidou; Cyprus	1.87
Pole vault	Mirè Reinstorf; South Africa	4.15 AU20R	Élise Russis; France	4.15	Heather Abadie; Canada	4.05
Long jump	Maja Åskag; Sweden	6.60 PB	Shaili Singh; India	6.59 PB	Mariia Horielova; Ukraine	6.50 PB
Triple jump	Maja Åskag; Sweden	13.75	Tessy Ebosele; Spain	13.63 PB	Darja Sopova; Latvia	13.60
Shot put	Miné de Klerk; South Africa	17.40	Pınar Akyol; Turkey	16.72	Dane Roets; South Africa	15.61
Discus throw	Violetta Ignatyeva; Authorised Neutral Athletes	57.84	Miné de Klerk; South Africa	53.50 AU20R	Alina Nikitsenka; Belarus	51.47
Hammer throw	Silja Kosonen; Finland	71.64 CR	Rose Loga; France	67.11	Maryola Bukel; Belarus	65.20
Javelin throw	Adriana Vilagoš; Serbia	61.46 WU20L	Elina Tzengko; Greece	57.91	Yiselena Ballar Rojas; Cuba	55.48
Heptathlon	Saga Vanninen; Finland	5997	Pippi Lotta Enok; Estonia	5746 PB	Szabina Szűcs; Hungary	5674 PB

- WU20R (World U20 Record), WU20L (World U20 Leading), CR (Championships Record), AU20R (Area U20 Record), NU20R (National U20 Record), PB (Personal Best), SB (Season Best)

== Mixed results ==
=== Track ===
Event	Gold		Silver		Bronze	
4 × 400 m relay	Nigeria; Johnson Nnamani; Imaobong Nse Uko; Opeyemi Deborah Oke; Bamidele Ajayi; *Ella Onojuvwevwo	3:19.70 CR	Poland; Kornelia Lesiewicz; Alicja Kaczmarek; Michał Wróbel; Patryk Grzegorzewicz; *Olga Rzeszewska; *Mateusz Matera	3:19.80 SB	India; Barath Sridhar; Priya Mohan; Summy; Kapil; *Abdul Razak Cherankulangara Rasheed	3:20.60 SB

- WU20R (World U20 Record), WU20L (World U20 Leading), CR (Championships Record), AU20R (Area U20 Record), NU20R (National U20 Record), PB (Personal Best), SB (Season Best)

== Records set ==
- 4 world U20 records: (Sasha Zhoya (FRA) in the 110 m hurdles - 12.93 semifinal and 12.72 final; Jamaica in the women's 4 × 100 m relay – 42.94; South Africa in the men's 4 × 100 m relay – 38.51).
- 15 championship records: (Anthony Pesela BOT in the men's 400 m - 44.58; Emmanuel Wanyonyi KEN in the men's 800 m – 1:43.76; Tadese Worku ETH in the men's 3000 m - 7:42.09; Sasha Zhoya FRA in the 110 m hurdles - 12.93 and 12.72; Mykolas Alekna LTU in the men's Discus Throw – 69.81; South Africa in the men's 4 × 100 m – 38.51; Christine Mboma NAM 22.41 semifinal, Beatrice Masiilingi NAM 22.19 semifinal and Mboma 21.84 final in the women's 200 m; Silja Kosonen FIN in the women's hammer - 71.64 m; Jamaica in the women's 4 × 100 m – 42.94; Mixed 4 × 400 m (new event) India in heat 1 - 3:23.36, Nigeria in heat 2 - 3:21.66 and Nigeria in final - 3:19.70).
- 11 area U20 records: (Mirè Reinstorf RSA in the women's pole vault – 4.15 m; Mine De Klerk RSA in the women's discus – 53.50 m; Jamaica in the women's 4 × 100 m – 42.94; Sasha Zhoya FRA in the 110 m hurdles - 12.93 semifinal and 12.72 final; men's 4 × 100 m Poland with 38.93 in the heat and 38.90 in the final, South Africa and Nigeria =AR both 39.33 in the heats, South Africa 38.51 and Jamaica 38.61 in the final)
- 68 national U20 records.
- 10 national senior records.
- 259 personal bests.

== Medal table ==
* Host nation (Kenya)

Rank	Nation	Gold	Silver	Bronze	Total
1	Kenya*	8	1	7	16
2	Finland	4	1	0	5
3	Nigeria	4	0	3	7
4	Ethiopia	3	7	2	12
5	Jamaica	3	6	2	11
6	South Africa	3	2	4	9
7	Botswana	3	1	0	4
8	Sweden	3	0	0	3
9	France	2	4	2	8
–	Authorised Neutral Athletes^{[1]}	2	1	0	3
10	Czech Republic	2	0	1	3
11	Namibia	1	3	0	4
12	Belarus	1	1	3	5
13	Mexico	1	1	0	2
13	Turkey	1	1	0	2
15	Cuba	1	0	2	3
16	Israel	1	0	0	1
16	Lithuania	1	0	0	1
16	Serbia	1	0	0	1
19	Poland	0	2	3	5
20	Switzerland	0	2	2	4
21	Greece	0	2	1	3
21	India	0	2	1	3
23	Estonia	0	2	0	2
24	Spain	0	1	2	3
25	Italy	0	1	1	2
25	Ukraine	0	1	1	2
27	Algeria	0	1	0	1
27	Belgium	0	1	0	1
27	Colombia	0	1	0	1
30	Canada	0	0	2	2
30	Hungary	0	0	2	2
32	Cyprus	0	0	1	1
32	Eritrea	0	0	1	1
32	Latvia	0	0	1	1
32	Uganda	0	0	1	1
Totals (35 entries)		45	45	45	135

Notes

^[1] Not included in the official medal table.

== Placing table ==
Kenya won the ranking in the placing table.

Rank	Country	1st place, gold medalist(s)	2nd place, silver medalist(s)	3rd place, bronze medalist(s)	4	5	6	7	8	Points
1	Kenya	8	1	7	1	0	2	1	2	128
2	Ethiopia	3	7	2	4	1	0	1	0	111
3	Jamaica	3	6	2	2	0	1	4	1	100
4	South Africa	3	2	4	1	3	3	1	2	92
5	France	2	4	2	3	2	0	1	2	83
6	Nigeria	4	0	3	4	0	0	0	3	73
7	Poland	0	2	3	3	1	4	2	1	68
8	Finland	4	1	0	2	2	0	0	2	59
9	Italy	0	1	1	2	2	5	1	3	51
10	Czech Republic	2	0	1	1	4	0	1	5	50
11	Spain	0	1	2	2	2	3	0	0	46
12	India	0	2	1	3	1	1	1	1	45
13	Greece	0	2	1	2	1	3	0	0	43
14	Belarus	1	1	3	0	0	1	0	0	36
15	Ukraine	0	1	1	1	2	1	2	0	33
16	Botswana	3	1	0	0	0	0	0	0	31
16	Uganda	0	0	1	2	1	2	2	1	31
18	Namibia	1	3	0	0	0	0	0	0	29
19	Eritrea	0	0	1	1	2	2	1	1	28
20	Switzerland	0	2	2	0	0	0	0	0	26
20	Turkey	1	1	0	0	0	1	3	2	26
22	Cuba	1	0	2	0	0	1	1	0	25
23	Sweden	3	0	0	0	0	0	0	0	24
24	Canada	0	0	2	0	0	1	3	0	21
24	Hungary	0	0	2	0	2	0	0	1	21
26	Estonia	0	2	0	1	0	0	0	0	19
27	Colombia	0	1	0	0	2	1	0	0	18
28	Iran	0	0	0	2	1	1	0	0	17
29	Belgium	0	1	0	0	1	1	0	1	15
29	Mexico	1	1	0	0	0	0	0	0	15
29	Serbia	1	0	0	0	1	1	0	0	15
32	Cyprus	0	0	1	0	1	1	0	0	13
33	Lithuania	1	0	0	0	0	1	0	0	11
34	Israel	1	0	0	0	0	0	1	0	10
34	Slovenia	0	0	0	1	1	0	0	1	10
36	Austria	0	0	0	1	1	0	0	0	9
36	Brazil	0	0	0	1	0	1	0	1	9
36	Latvia	0	0	1	0	0	1	0	0	9
39	Croatia	0	0	0	0	1	0	2	0	8
39	Romania	0	0	0	0	0	0	4	0	8
41	Algeria	0	1	0	0	0	0	0	0	7
41	Bahamas	0	0	0	1	0	0	1	0	7
41	Morocco	0	0	0	0	1	0	1	1	7
44	Burundi	0	0	0	0	1	0	0	1	5
44	Denmark	0	0	0	0	1	0	0	1	5
44	Iceland	0	0	0	1	0	0	0	0	5
44	Oman	0	0	0	1	0	0	0	0	5
44	Qatar	0	0	0	1	0	0	0	0	5
49	Ecuador	0	0	0	0	1	0	0	0	4
49	Zambia	0	0	0	0	1	0	0	0	4
51	Argentina	0	0	0	0	0	1	0	0	3
51	Armenia	0	0	0	0	0	1	0	0	3
51	Slovakia	0	0	0	0	0	1	0	0	3
54	Ivory Coast	0	0	0	0	0	0	1	0	2
54	Grenada	0	0	0	0	0	0	1	0	2
54	Hong Kong	0	0	0	0	0	0	1	0	2
54	Kosovo	0	0	0	0	0	0	1	0	2
54	Malta	0	0	0	0	0	0	1	0	2
54	Portugal	0	0	0	0	0	0	1	0	2
54	Sri Lanka	0	0	0	0	0	0	1	0	2
61	Guatemala	0	0	0	0	0	0	0	1	1
61	Senegal	0	0	0	0	0	0	0	1	1
61	South Sudan	0	0	0	0	0	0	0	1	1

== Participation ==
The following is a list of participating nations with the number of qualified athletes in brackets. A country without any qualified athlete could enter either one male or one female. A total 114 National Associations (plus the teams from Authorized Neutral Athletes and Athlete Refugee Team) and 897 athletes are scheduled to compete. A number of notable athletics nations chose not to send a team, including the United States, Australia, People's Republic of China, Japan, Great Britain, the Netherlands and Germany.

- Algeria (11)
- Authorised Neutral Athletes (25)
- Argentina (5)
- Armenia (2)
- ART (3)
- Austria (2)
- Azerbaijan (1)
- Bahamas (9)
- Bangladesh (1)
- Burundi (5)
- Belgium (5)
- Bermuda (1)
- Belarus (8)
- Bolivia (3)
- Botswana (13)
- Brazil (19)
- Bulgaria (3)
- Burkina Faso (2)
- Canada (14)
- Republic of the Congo (1)
- Chile (2)
- Ivory Coast (1)
- Cameroon (1)
- Democratic Republic of the Congo (1)
- Colombia (8)
- Comoros (1)
- Costa Rica (2)
- Croatia (7)
- Cuba (5)
- Cyprus (5)
- Czech Republic (29)
- Denmark (5)
- Djibouti (2)
- Dominica (1)
- Dominican Republic (1)
- Ecuador (7)
- Egypt (4)
- Eritrea (12)
- El Salvador (1)
- Spain (16)
- Estonia (5)
- Ethiopia (25)
- Finland (30)
- France (27)
- Georgia (1)
- Equatorial Guinea (1)
- Greece (22)
- Grenada (1)
- Guatemala (4)
- Guyana (1)
- Hong Kong (1)
- Honduras (1)
- Hungary (17)
- India (28)
- Iran (9)
- Iraq (4)
- Iceland (2)
- Israel (3)
- United States Virgin Islands (1)
- Italy (43)
- Jamaica (40)
- Kazakhstan (1)
- Kenya (46)
- Kosovo (1)
- Saudi Arabia (6)
- Latvia (7)
- Libya (1)
- Lebanon (2)
- Liberia (1)
- Lesotho (1)
- Lithuania (6)
- Morocco (9)
- Malawi (1)
- Maldives (1)
- Mexico (10)
- Mali (1)
- Malta (1)
- Montenegro (1)
- Monaco (1)
- Namibia (6)
- Nicaragua (1)
- Nepal (1)
- Nigeria (32)
- Niger (1)
- Oman (2)
- Peru (3)
- Poland (36)
- Portugal (8)
- Puerto Rico (2)
- Qatar (7)
- Romania (16)
- South Africa (50)
- Senegal (1)
- Seychelles (1)
- Singapore (1)
- Sierra Leone (1)
- Slovenia (10)
- Somalia (1)
- Serbia (10)
- Sri Lanka (7)
- South Sudan (3)
- Sudan (1)
- Switzerland (5)
- Slovakia (5)
- Sweden (3)
- Eswatini (5)
- Trinidad and Tobago (3)
- Tunisia (8)
- Turkey (25)
- Uganda (10)
- Ukraine (21)
- Venezuela (1)
- Saint Vincent and the Grenadines (1)
- Yemen (1)
- Zambia (3)
- Zimbabwe (2)
