= Addisu Yihune =

Ethiopian runner

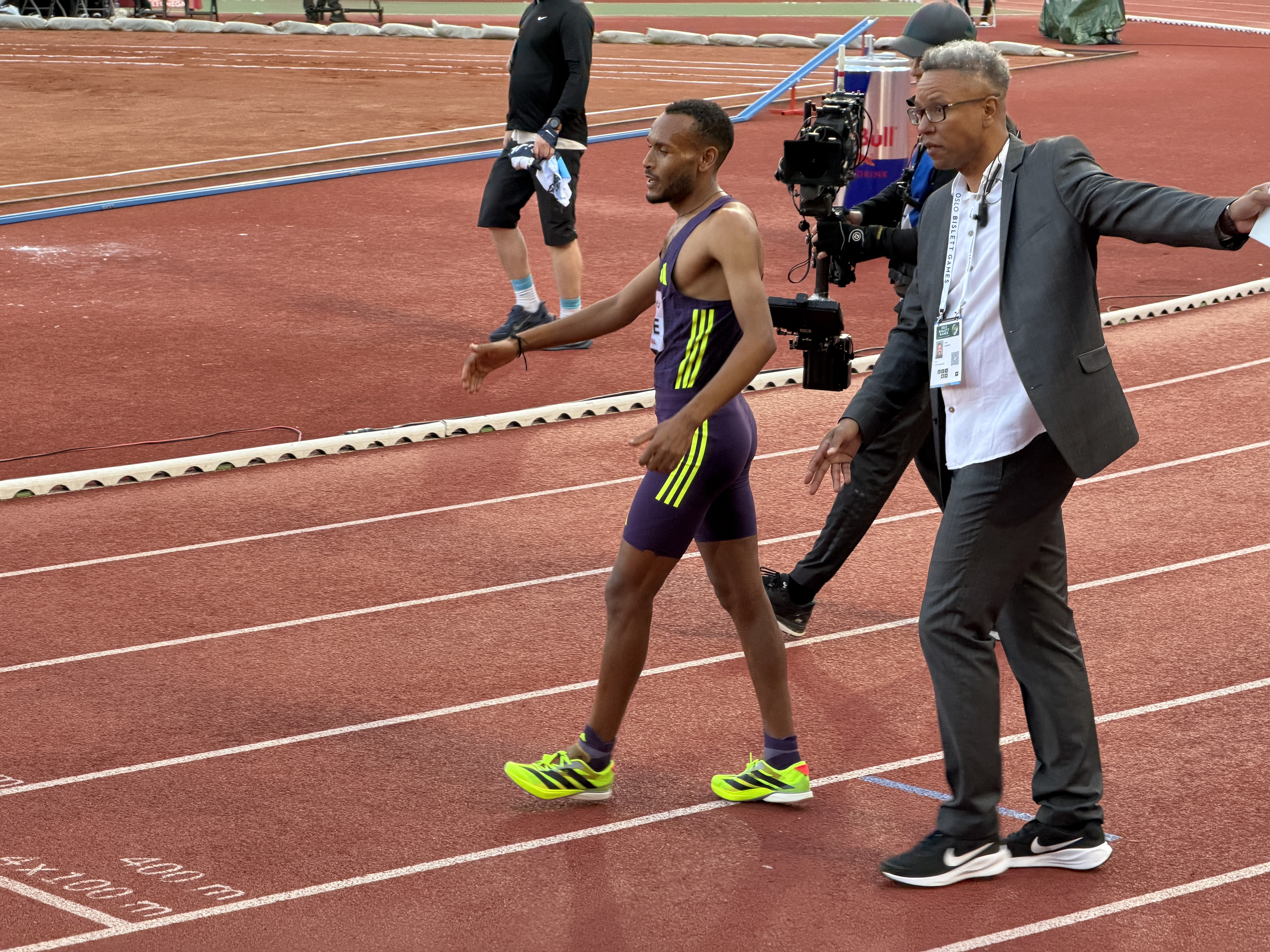

Personal information
- Born: 17 March 2003 (age 23) Dega Damot, Amhara Region, Ethiopia

Sport
- Country: Ethiopia
- Sport: Track and field
- Events: 3000 m, 5000 m

Achievements and titles
- Personal bests: Outdoor; 3000 m: 7:33.94 (Chorzów 2024); 5000 m: 12:49.65 (Oslo 2024); 5K (road): 13:12 (Herzogenaurach 2022); Indoor; 3000 m: 7:36.13 (Boston 2023)
Medal record
Representing Ethiopia
Men's athletics
World U20 Championships
Gold medal – first place	2022 Cali	5000 m
World Road Running Championships
Gold medal – first place	2026 Copenhagen	5K mixed team

Addisu Yihune (born 17 March 2003) is an Ethiopian long-distance runner. He notably won the 5000 metres at the 2022 World Athletics U20 Championships. He also won the 2022 Cross de San Sebastián and Campaccio cross-country races.
