= Tima Godbless =

Nigerian sprinter (born 2004)

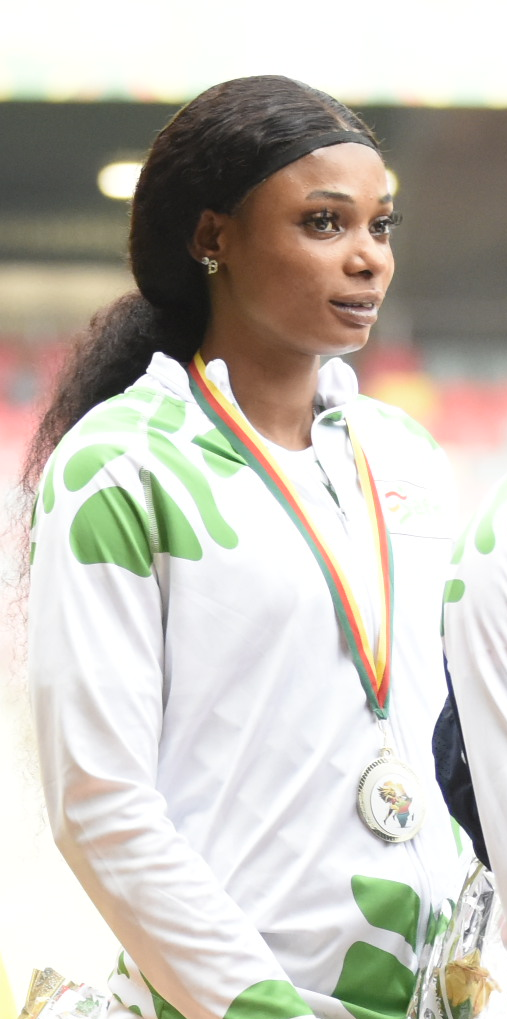

Personal information
- Nationality: Nigerian
- Born: Tima Seikeseye Godbless; 14 July 2004 (age 22)

Sport
- Sport: Athletics
- Event: Sprinter

Achievements and titles
- Personal bests: 60 m 7.08i (Fayetteville, 2025); 100 m 10.91 (Jacksonville, 2025); 200 m 22.55 (Gainesville, 2025)
Medal record
Women's athletics
Representing Nigeria
African Championships
Gold medal – first place	2022 Mauritius	4 × 100 m relay
Gold medal – first place	2024 Douala	4 × 100 m relay
World Athletics U20 Championships
Bronze medal – third place	2021 Nairobi	4 × 100 m relay
African U20 Championships
Gold medal – first place	2023 Ndola	100 m
Gold medal – first place	2023 Ndola	200 m

Tima Seikeseye Godbless (born 14 July 2004) is a Nigerian sprinter.

== Early life ==
Tima Seikeseye Godbless was born on July 14, 2004, in Bebelebiri, Yenagoa, Nigeria. Godbless joined Louisiana State University in 2022.

== Career ==
=== 2021 ===
In 2021, she won bronze as part of the Nigerian 4 × 100 m relay team at the 2021 World Athletics U20 Championships in Nairobi. She was a semi finalist in the individual event at the championship.

=== 2022 ===
She finished fourth in the 2022 African Championships in Athletics – Women's 100 metres. She won gold at the championship as part of the Nigerian 4 × 100 m relay team.

She ran a time of 11.09 seconds during the 2022 World Athletics U20 Championships – Women's 100 metres in Cali, a national U20 record.

In December 2022, she won gold in the 100 metres at the Asaba 2022 Sports Festival in 11.32 seconds. At the festival she also ran a personal best 22.07 to win the 200 m.

=== 2023 ===
In 2023, she won a sprint double at the 2023 African U20 Championships in Ndola, winning both 100 m and 200 m gold medals, running 11.43 seconds for the 100 m title and 23.28 s in the 200 m. However, an injury suffered at the Nigerian National Championships in Benin City ended her season.

=== 2024 ===
Godbless ran a time of 11.24s to win the women's 100 m at the Keyth Talley Invitational in Baton Rouge, in March 2024. She ran as part of the Nigerian 4 × 100 m relay team which qualified for the 2024 Paris Olympics at the 2024 World Relays Championships in Nassau, Bahamas. She competed in the 100 metres at the 2024 Paris Olympics. She also competed in the 4 × 100 m relay at the Games.

=== 2025 ===
In May 2025, at the NCAA East Preliminary event she ran a new personal best time for the 100 metres of 10.91 seconds (1.2 m/s). The time moved her to fourth on the all-time Nigerian list. She finished third in the NCAA Outdoor Championships final over 100 metres in a time of 11.19 seconds.

=== 2026 ===
In June 2026, Godbless qualified for the 2026 NCAA Outdoor Championships.
