= Maria Mihalache =

Romanian sprinter (born 2003)

Personal information
- Born: 11 May 2003 (age 23)

Sport
- Sport: Athletics
- Event: Sprint

Achievements and titles
- Personal bests: 60m: 7.26 (Apeldoorn, 2025); 100m: 11.58 (Cluj, 2024); 200m: 23.67 (Tallinn, 2021)

Maria Mihalache (born 11 May 2003) is a Romanian sprinter and model. She is a multiple-time national champion over 60 metres, 100 metres and 200 metres. She won the 60m at the 2025 Balkan Athletics Indoor Championships.

== Early life ==
From Bucharest, she started training in athletics at a young age when she would regularly beat her older brother in races and was taken to a local track. She participated in endurance events, where she won several cross-country races, but was more passionate about sprint events and became leading Romanian sprinter at junior level.

== Career ==
She is a member of CS Olimpia-CS Rapid where she is coached by Mihăiță Băloi. She finished ninth overall at the 2021 World Athletics U20 Championships in the 100 metres in Nairobi.

She won her first senior national titles in 2022, winning in both the 100 metres and the 200 metres.

She won the senior national title in 2024, as well as winning multiple medals at the Romanian junior championships. In 2024, she had to recover from suffering a concussion that year after winning at the Jerusalem Grand Prix, but hitting her head on the floor at the finish.

In February 2025, she won the 60 metres at the 2025 Balkan Athletics Indoor Championships in Belgrade. She competed in the 60 metres at the 2025 European Athletics Indoor Championships in Apeldoorn, reaching the semi-finals with a personal best 7.26 seconds. That month, she ran for Romania at the 2025 World Athletics Indoor Championships in Nanjing.

== Personal life ==
She has also worked as a model and has a strong interest in fashion. She studies for a master's degree at Romanian Facultatea de Sport.
