= Habtom Samuel =

Eritrean runner

Personal information
- Born: 30 November 2003 (age 22)
- Height: 5 ft 9 in (175 cm)

Sport
- Country: Eritrea
- Sport: Track and field
- Events: 3000 m, 5000 m, 10,000 m
- College team: New Mexico Lobos
Medal record
Representing Eritrea
Men's athletics
World U20 Championships
Bronze medal – third place	2021 Nairobi	3000 m
Bronze medal – third place	2022 Cali	5000 m

Habtom Samuel (born 30 November 2003) is an Eritrean long-distance runner. He won a bronze medal in the 3000 metres at the 2021 World Athletics U20 Championships and in the 5000 metres at the 2022 World Athletics U20 Championships. He placed 17th in both the 10,000 metres at the 2022 World Athletics Championships and the senior race at the 2023 World Athletics Cross Country Championships.

== College ==
Since 2023, he has competed collegiately for the University of New Mexico, where he has won multiple national titles. In his first appearance at an NCAA Outdoor championship, the 2024 NCAA Outdoor Track and Field Championships, he won the men's 10,000 meters with a time of 28:07.82, despite falling 900 meters from the finish. The following year, he won the NCAA Division I Cross Country Championships. Samuel finished second in both the 5,000 and 10,000 meters at the 2025 NCAA Outdoor Championships, as well as a silver medal in the 5,000 meters at the 2025 NCAA Indoor Championships. His senior year would see him sweep the long-distance events at the NCAA Championships, with 5,000 meter gold at the 2026 NCAA Indoor Championships and titles in both the 5,000 meters and 10,000 meters at the 2026 NCAA Outdoor Championships, becoming the first man to complete the "distance double" since Ky Robinson in 2023.

== Professional ==
In the summer of 2026, Samuel transitioned to road racing and won both the Beach to Beacon 10K and Falmouth Road Race. On 8 November 2026, Samuel won the BAA Boston Half Marathon with a time of 59:49, which is the fastest half marathon ever recorded in Massachusetts.

== Personal bests ==
- 3000 metres indoor – 7:40.63 (Boston 2024) NR
- 5000 metres – 12:57.22 (Los Angeles, CA 2026)
  - 5000 metres indoor – 13:04.92 (Boston 2025) NR
- 10,000 metres – 26:51.06 (San Juan Capistrano, CA 2025)
- 10K (road) – 27:40 (Cape Elizabeth, ME 2026)
- Half Marathon – 59:01 (Houston, TX 2026)
