= Merhawi Mebrahtu =

Eritrean runner (born 2003)

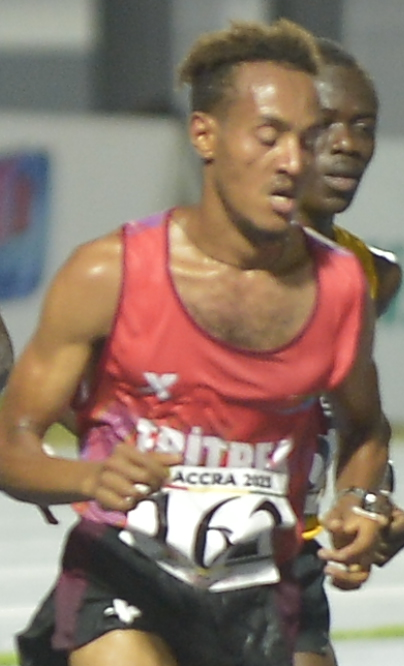

Personal information
- Born: 21 September 2003 (age 22)

Sport
- Country: Eritrea
- Sport: Track and field
- Events: 5000 m, 10,000 m
Medal record
Representing Eritrea
Men's athletics
World U20 Championships
Silver medal – second place	2022 Cali	5000 m

Merhawi Mebrahtu (born 21 September 2003) is an Eritrean long-distance runner. He won a silver medal in the 5000 metres at the 2022 World Athletics U20 Championships. He placed 17th in the 5000 metres at the 2022 World Athletics Championships and 19th in the 10,000 metres at the 2023 World Athletics Championships. At the Paris Olympics in August 2024 10,000 meter run he finished in 15th place in the final with a time of 27:24.25.

== Personal bests ==
Outdoor

- 3000 metres – 7:55.50 (Nairobi 2021)
- 5000 metres – 13:04.49 (Huelva 2022) NU20R
- 10,000 metres – 26:55.51 (Nerja 2024)

Road

- 5K – 13:29 (Boston 2023)
- 10K – 28:18 (Valencia 2024)
- Half marathon – 59:06 (Valencia 2023)
