= List of flag bearers for the Gambia at the Olympics =

The Gambia at the Olympics
- Flag of the Gambia
- IOC code: GAM
- NOC: The Gambia National Olympic Committee
- Website: www.gnoc.gm
- Medals: Gold 0 Silver 0 Bronze 0 Total 0

Summer appearances
- 1984; 1988; 1992; 1996; 2000; 2004; 2008; 2012; 2016; 2020; 2024

This is a list of flag bearers who have represented the Gambia at the Olympics.

Flag bearers carry the national flag of their country at the opening ceremony of the Olympic Games.

#	Event year	Season	Flag bearer	Sport
1	1984	Summer	Oumar Fye	Athletics
2	1988	Summer	Dawda Jallow	Athletics
3	1992	Summer	Dawda Jallow	Athletics
4	1996	Summer	Dawda Jallow	Athletics
5	2000	Summer	Adama N'Jie	Athletics
6	2004	Summer	Jaysuma Saidy Ndure	Athletics
7	2008	Summer	Badou Jack	Boxing
8	2012	Summer	Suwaibou Sanneh	Athletics
9	2016	Summer	Gina Bass	Athletics
10	2020	Summer	Gina Bass	Athletics
10	2020	Summer	Ebrima Camara	Athletics
11	2024	Summer	Gina Mariam Bass Bittaye	Athletics
11	2024	Summer	Faye Njie	Judo

== See also ==
- Gambia at the Olympics
