= The Gambia at the Olympics =

- Flag of the Gambia
- IOC code: GAM
- NOC: The Gambia National Olympic Committee
- Website: www.gnoc.gm
- Medals: Gold 0 Silver 0 Bronze 0 Total 0

Summer appearances
- 1984; 1988; 1992; 1996; 2000; 2004; 2008; 2012; 2016; 2020; 2024

The Gambia has sent athletes to every Summer Olympic Games held since 1984, although the country has never won an Olympic medal. The nation has never competed at the Winter Olympic Games.

The Gambia National Olympic Committee (GNOC) was formed in 1972 and recognised by the International Olympic Committee (IOC) in 1976. The country boycotted the first two games for which it was eligible (1976 and 1980). Its first delegation consisted of ten athletes, all of whom were runners. Subsequent delegations have included wrestlers (1988), a long jumper (1996), a boxer (2008), a judoka (2016), and a swimmer (2016). In all other years, the Gambia has been represented solely by runners.

== National Olympic Committee ==
The Gambia National Olympic Committee (GNOC) was formed in 1972, but not recognised by the International Olympic Committee (IOC) until 1976. The GNOC is based at Olympic House, Bakau. In April 2014, on government orders, police seized the building and barred GNOC employees from entering. At the same time, the Ministry of Youth and Sports placed a travel ban on GNOC officials. The disruption meant that the Gambia did not send athletes to the 2014 African Youth Games in Botswana. Following condemnation from the IOC, Olympic House was reopened in August, but the government continued to control access to the building. A crisis meeting was held the following month, in which the GNOC was threatened with suspension if the government did not refrain from interference. Despite an initial deadline for the reopening of Olympic House not being met, the situation was eventually resolved without a suspension being issued.

== History ==
=== Early years ===
The 1976 Summer Olympics in Montreal, would have been The Gambia's inaugural competition but it joined 28 countries in a boycott (most of which were also African). This boycott was to protest the IOC's decision to allow New Zealand to compete at the games, despite its rugby union team breaking the international sporting boycott of South Africa earlier in the year. The Gambia was also invited to the Moscow 1980 Summer Olympics, but declined the invitation and joined the American-led boycott. The country finally made its debut at the Los Angeles 1984 Summer Olympics, sending ten athletes (six men and four women) who all competed in running. Amie N'Dow was the only Gambian to progress past the first heats, reaching the quarter-finals of the women's 200 metres. At the Seoul 1988 Summer Olympics, the Gambia sent six athletes – three athletes (two men and one woman) and three wrestlers (all male). Flagbearer Dawda Jallow made the quarter-finals of the men's 400 metres.

=== 1990s ===
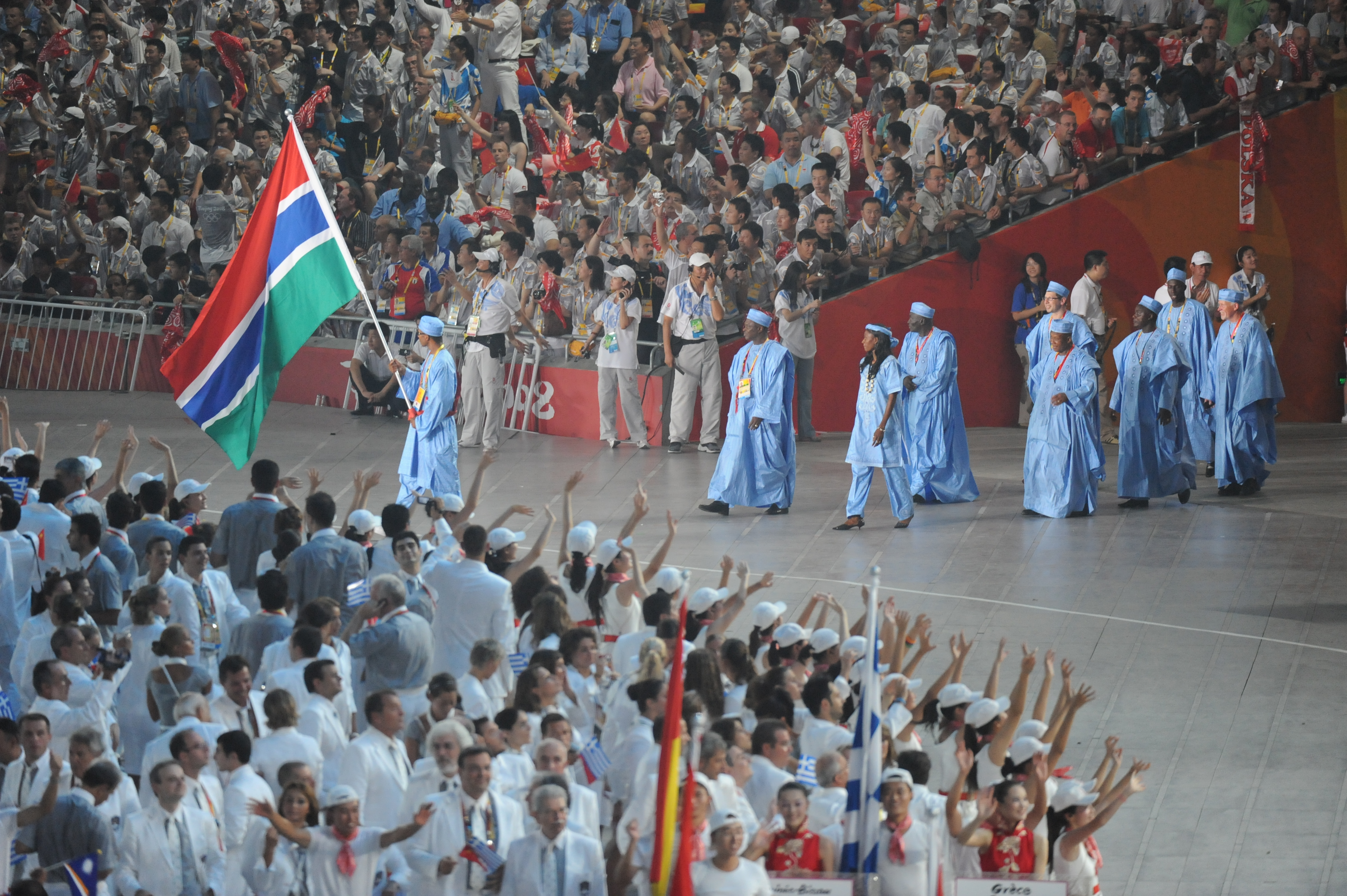
Gambia at the 2008 Summer Olympics - Opening Ceremony - Beijing, China

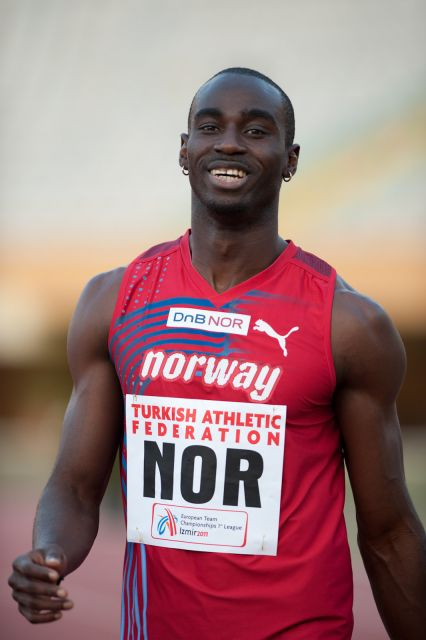
Jaysuma Saidy Ndure (pictured in 2011) ran for The Gambia at the Athens 2004 Summer Olympics, but later switched nationalities and competed for Norway in 2008, 2012 and 2016.

At the 1992 Summer Olympics, the Gambian delegation (consisting of five athletes) was all-male for the first and only time. It again consisted entirely of runners, four of whom ran the men's 4 × 100 metres relay. Bangladesh and San Marino were the only countries to record slower times in the event. The Atlanta 1996 Summer Olympics saw the Gambian delegation increase to nine athletes, although the only woman was Adama Njie. Ousman Sallah (a long jumper) was the only non-runner, while Dawda Jallow was flag-bearer for a third consecutive occasion, and became the only Gambian to compete in four games.

=== 2000s ===
For the Sydney 2000 Summer Olympics, The Gambia sent just two athletes (Adama Njie and Pa Mamadou Gai), with Njie becoming the country's first female flag-bearer. There was no increase in the size of the delegation for the 2004 Summer Olympics in Athens, with Njie returning for a third games and being joined by Jaysuma Saidy Ndure, who was made the flag-bearer. Ndure, aged 20, reached the quarter-finals of both the 100 metres and the 200 metres, but later transferred nationalities and competed for Norway. The 2008 Summer Olympics in Beijing saw the Gambia send three athletes (two men and one woman), including the country's first Olympic boxer, Badou Jack, who was made the flag-bearer. He lost to India's Vijender Singh in the opening round, while neither of the other two athletes (runners Suwaibou Sanneh and Fatou Tiyana made it past their first heats.

=== 2010s ===
The Gambian delegation for the London 2012 Summer Olympics was of two track and field athletes, Suwaibou Sanneh and Saruba Colley. Colley failed to progress past the first round of the women's 100 metres, but Sanneh made the semi-finals of the men's 100 metres, running a national record time of 10.18 seconds. For the Rio 2016 Summer Olympics, the Gambia sent its largest delegation since 1996, and its first to contain athletes from more than two sports. Adama Jammeh and Gina Bass (the flag-bearer and only woman on the team) ran in the respective 200 metres events, while Faye Njie and Pap Jonga became the first Gambians to compete in Olympic judo and Olympic swimming, respectively.

== Medal table ==
Games	Athletes	Gold	Silver	Bronze	Total	Rank
1984 Los Angeles	10	0	0	0	0	–
1988 Seoul	6	0	0	0	0	–
1992 Barcelona	5	0	0	0	0	–
1996 Atlanta	9	0	0	0	0	–
2000 Sydney	2	0	0	0	0	–
2004 Athens	2	0	0	0	0	–
2008 Beijing	3	0	0	0	0	–
2012 London	2	0	0	0	0	–
2016 Rio de Janeiro	4	0	0	0	0	–
2020 Tokyo	4	0	0	0	0	–
2024 Paris	7	0	0	0	0	–
2028 Los Angeles	future event					
2032 Brisbane	future event					
Total		0	0	0	0	–

== See also ==
- List of flag bearers for the Gambia at the Olympics
