= The Gambia at the 2018 Commonwealth Games =

- Flag of the Gambia
- CGF code: GAM
- CGA: Gambia National Olympic Committee
- Website: gnoc.gm

in Gold Coast, Australia 4 April 2018 – 15 April 2018
- Competitors: 6 in 1 sport
- Medals: Gold 0 Silver 0 Bronze 0 Total 0

Commonwealth Games appearances (overview)
- 1970; 1974; 1978; 1982; 1986; 1990; 1994; 1998; 2002; 2006; 2010; 2014; 2018; 2022; 2026; 2030

The Gambia competed at the 2018 Commonwealth Games in the Gold Coast, Australia from April 4 to April 15, 2018. It was The Gambia's 11th appearance at the Commonwealth Games.

== Competitors ==
The following is the list of number of competitors participating at the Games per sport/discipline.

| Sport | Men | Women | Total |
|---|---|---|---|
| Athletics | 4 | 2 | 6 |
| Total | 4 | 2 | 6 |

== Athletics ==
The Gambia participated with 6 athletes (4 men and 2 women).

Men
Track & road events

| Athlete | Event | Heat | | Semifinal | | Final | |
| Athlete | Event | Result | Rank | Result | Rank | Result | Rank |
|---|---|---|---|---|---|---|---|
| Ebrahima Camara | 100 m | 10.50 | 4 | did not advance | | | |
| Assan Faye | 100 m | 10.52 | 5 | did not advance | | | |
| Adama Jammeh | 100 m | 10.59 | 3 | did not advance | | | |
| Abdoulie Asim | 200 m | 21.79 | 6 | did not advance | | | |
| Ebrahima Camara | 200 m | 21.58 | 6 | did not advance | | | |
| Adama Jammeh | 200 m | 21.11 | 3 | did not advance | | | |
| Abdoulie Asim; Ebrahima Camara; Assan Faye; Adama Jammeh | 4 × 100 m relay | 40.57 | 4 | — | | did not advance | |

Women
Track & road events

| Athlete | Event | Heat | | Semifinal | | Final | |
| Athlete | Event | Result | Rank | Result | Rank | Result | Rank |
|---|---|---|---|---|---|---|---|
| Gina Bass | 100 m | 11.50 | 2 Q | 11.64 | 3 | did not advance | |
| Ola Buwaro | 100 m | 12.11 | 6 | did not advance | | | |
| Gina Bass | 200 m | 23.24 | 3 Q | 23.60 | 5 | did not advance | |
| Ola Buwaro | 200 m | 24.66 | 7 | did not advance | | | |

== See also ==
- Gambia at the 2018 Summer Youth Olympics
