= The Gambia at the 2020 Summer Olympics =

- IOC code: GAM
- NOC: Gambia National Olympic Committee

in Tokyo, Japan July 23, 2021 – August 8, 2021
- Competitors: 4 in 3 sports
- Flag bearers (opening): Gina Bass; Ebrima Camara
- Flag bearer (closing): Ebrima Camara
- Medals: Gold 0 Silver 0 Bronze 0 Total 0

Summer Olympics appearances (overview)
- 1984; 1988; 1992; 1996; 2000; 2004; 2008; 2012; 2016; 2020; 2024

The Gambia competed at the 2020 Summer Olympics in Tokyo. Originally scheduled to take place from 24 July to 9 August 2020, the Games were postponed to 23 July to 8 August 2021, due to the COVID-19 pandemic. It was the nation's tenth consecutive appearance at the Summer Olympics since its debut at the 1984 Summer Olympics.

== Competitors ==
The following is the list of number of competitors in the Games.

| Sport | Men | Women | Total |
|---|---|---|---|
| Athletics | 1 | 1 | 2 |
| Judo | 1 | 0 | 1 |
| Swimming | 1 | 0 | 1 |
| Total | 3 | 1 | 4 |

== Athletics ==
Gambian athletes achieved the entry standards, either by qualifying time or by world ranking, in the following track and field events (up to a maximum of 3 athletes in each event):

Key

- Note–Ranks given for track events are within the athlete's heat only
- Q = Qualified for the next round
- q = Qualified for the next round as a fastest loser or, in field events, by position without achieving the qualifying target
- NR = National record
- N/A = Round not applicable for the event
- Bye = Athlete not required to compete in round

Track & road events

| Athlete | Event | Heat | | Quarterfinal | | Semifinal | | Final | |
| Athlete | Event | Result | Rank | Result | Rank | Result | Rank | Result | Rank |
|---|---|---|---|---|---|---|---|---|---|
| Ebrima Camara | Men's 100 m | Bye | | 10.33 | 6 | Did not advance | | | |
| Gina Bass | Women's 100 m | Bye | | 11.12 NR | 4 q | 11.16 | 6 | Did not advance | |
| Gina Bass | Women's 200 m | 22.74 | 2 Q | — | | 22.67 | 4 | Did not advance | |

== Judo ==
The Gambia qualified one judoka for the men's lightweight category (73 kg) at the Games. Rio 2016 Olympian Faye Njie accepted a continental berth from Africa as the nation's top-ranked judoka outside of direct qualifying position in the IJF World Ranking List of June 28, 2021.

| Athlete | Event | Round of 64 | Round of 32 | Round of 16 | Quarterfinals | Semifinals | Repechage | Final / BM | |
| Athlete | Event | Opposition Result | Opposition Result | Opposition Result | Opposition Result | Opposition Result | Opposition Result | Opposition Result | Rank |
|---|---|---|---|---|---|---|---|---|---|
| Faye Njie | Men's −73 kg | Bye | Makhmadbekov (TJK); L 00–10 | Did not advance | | | | | |

== Swimming ==
The Gambia received a universality invitation from FINA to send a top-ranked male swimmer in his respective individual events to the Olympics, based on the FINA Points System of June 28, 2021.

| Athlete | Event | Heat | | Semifinal | | Final | |
| Athlete | Event | Time | Rank | Time | Rank | Time | Rank |
|---|---|---|---|---|---|---|---|
| Ebrima Buaro | Men's 50 m freestyle | 27.44 | 66 | Did not advance | | | |
