= The Gambia at the 1984 Summer Olympics =

- Flag of the Gambia
- IOC code: GAM
- NOC: Gambia National Olympic Committee

in Los Angeles
- Competitors: 10 in 1 sport
- Flag bearer: Oumar Fye
- Medals: Gold 0 Silver 0 Bronze 0 Total 0

Summer Olympics appearances (overview)
- 1984; 1988; 1992; 1996; 2000; 2004; 2008; 2012; 2016; 2020; 2024

The Gambia competed in the Olympic Games for the first time at the 1984 Summer Olympics in Los Angeles, United States.

== Athletics ==
Key

- Note – Ranks given for track events are within the athlete's heat only
- Q = Qualified for the next round
- q = Qualified for the next round as a fastest loser or, in field events, by position without achieving the qualifying target
- NR = National record
- N/A = Round not applicable for the event
- Bye = Athlete not required to compete in round

Men
Track & road events

Athlete	Event	Heat		Quarterfinal		Semifinal		Final	
Athlete	Event	Result	Rank	Result	Rank	Result	Rank	Result	Rank
Bakary Jarjue	100 m	10.68	4	did not advance					
Omar Faye	100 m	10.87	6	did not advance					
Omar Faye	200 m	21.56	5	did not advance					
Dawda Jallow	400 m	48.36	7	did not advance					
Peter Ceesay	800 m	1:55.35	7	did not advance					
Peter Ceesay	1500 m	3:59.14	7	n/a		did not advance			
Bakary Jarjue; Dawda Jallow; Abdurahman Jallow; Omar Faye	4 × 100 m relay	40.73	7	n/a		did not advance			

Women
Track & road events

Athlete	Event	Heat		Quarterfinal		Semifinal		Final	
Athlete	Event	Result	Rank	Result	Rank	Result	Rank	Result	Rank
Jabou Jawo	100 m	12.10 NR	7	did not advance					
Amie N'Dow	200 m	25.41	5 Q	25.24	8	did not advance			
Jabou Jawo; Amie N'Dow; Victoria Decka; Georgiana Freeman	4 × 100 m relay	47.18	6	n/a				did not advance	
