= The Gambia at the 2004 Summer Olympics =

- Flag of the Gambia
- IOC code: GAM
- NOC: The Gambia National Olympic Committee
- Website: www.gnoc.gm

in Athens
- Competitors: 2 in 1 sport
- Flag bearer: Jaysuma Saidy Ndure
- Medals: Gold 0 Silver 0 Bronze 0 Total 0

Summer Olympics appearances (overview)
- 1984; 1988; 1992; 1996; 2000; 2004; 2008; 2012; 2016; 2020; 2024

Gambia was represented at the 2004 Summer Olympics in Athens, Greece by the Gambia National Olympic Committee.

In total, two athletes including one man and one woman represented Gambia in one sport: athletics.

== Competitors ==
In total, two athletes represented Gambia at the 2004 Summer Olympics in Athens, Greece in one sport.

| Sport | Men | Women | Total |
|---|---|---|---|
| Athletics | 1 | 1 | 2 |
| Total | 1 | 1 | 2 |

== Athletics ==
In total, two Gambian athletes participated in the athletics events – Jaysuma Saidy Ndure contested the men's 100 m and the men's 200 m and Adama Njie contested the women's 800 m.

Most of the athletics events – including those which Gambian athletes took part in – took place at the Athens Olympic Stadium in Marousi, Athens from 18 to 29 August 2004.

The heats for the men's 100 m took place on 21 August 2004. Ndure finished third in his heat in a time of 10.26 seconds and he advanced to the quarter-finals. The quarter-finals took place later the same day. Ndure finished eighth in his quarter-final in a time of 10.39 seconds and he did not advance to the semi-finals.

The heats for the men's 200 m took place on 24 August 2004. Ndure finished fifth in his heat in a time of 20.78 seconds and he advanced to the quarter-finals as one of the fastest losers. The quarter-finals took place later the same day. Ndure finished sixth in his quarter-final in a time of 20.73 seconds and he did not advance to the semi-finals

| Athlete | Event | Heat | | Quarterfinal | | Semifinal | | Final | |
| Athlete | Event | Result | Rank | Result | Rank | Result | Rank | Result | Rank |
|---|---|---|---|---|---|---|---|---|---|
| Jaysuma Saidy Ndure | 100 m | 10.26 NR | 3 Q | 10.39 | 8 | Did not advance | | | |
| Jaysuma Saidy Ndure | 200 m | 20.78 | 5 q | 20.73 | 6 | Did not advance | | | |

The heats for the women's 800 m took place on 20 August 2004. Njie finished seventh in her heat in a time of two minutes 10.02 seconds and she did not advance to the semi-finals.

| Athlete | Event | Heat | | Semifinal | | Final | |
| Athlete | Event | Result | Rank | Result | Rank | Result | Rank |
|---|---|---|---|---|---|---|---|
| Adama Njie | 800 m | 2:10.02 | 7 | Did not advance | | | |
