= The Gambia at the 2012 Summer Olympics =

- Flag of the Gambia
- IOC code: GAM
- NOC: Gambia National Olympic Committee
- Website: www.gnoc.gm

in London
- Competitors: 2 in 1 sport
- Flag bearer: Suwaibou Sanneh
- Medals: Gold 0 Silver 0 Bronze 0 Total 0

Summer Olympics appearances (overview)
- 1984; 1988; 1992; 1996; 2000; 2004; 2008; 2012; 2016; 2020; 2024

The Gambia competed at the 2012 Summer Olympics in London, which was held from 27 July to 12 August 2012. The country's participation at London marked its eighth appearance in the Summer Olympics since its début at the 1984 Summer Olympics. The delegation included two athletes, Suwaibou Sanneh and Saruba Colley; the former had qualified by setting a qualifying time that fell within the required standard and the latter entered via a wildcard place. Sanneh was selected as the flag bearer for both the opening and closing ceremonies. Sanneh became the first Gambian athlete to advance into the semi-finals of the men's 100 metres, while Colley was eliminated after the quarter-final stages of the Women's 100 metres.

== Background ==
The Gambia participated in eight Summer Olympic Games between its début at the 1984 Summer Olympics in Los Angeles, United States and the 2012 Summer Olympics in London, England. No Gambian athlete has ever won a medal at the Olympics. The Gambia participated in the London Summer Olympics from 27 July to 12 August 2012. The Gambia National Olympic Committee (NOC) selected sprinters Suwaibou Sanneh in the men's 100 metres and Saruba Colley in the women's 100 metres. Sanneh was the flag bearer for both the opening and closing ceremonies. The athletes were due to train in York at various facilities in the city, including the Huntingdon athletics stadium and the University of York but withdrew due to financial issues. Along with the two athletes, a delegation led by the Gambia National Olympic Committee president Momodou Demba attended the London Games. The delegation consisted of Beatrice Allen, the vice-president, secretary general Peter Prom and treasurer Ousman Wadda.

== Athletics ==
Suwaibou Sanneh was the only male athlete representing The Gambia at the London Olympics. He previously competed in the 2008 Olympic Games in Beijing, China. Sanneh qualified for the London Olympics by securing the required qualifying time in the 'B' standard in an event in Jamaica. He competed in the men's 100 metres race on 4 August in the third heat of the quarter-finals, finishing fifth out of eight athletes with a time of 10.21 seconds. Sanneh became the first Gambian athlete to qualify for the semi-finals of the event, and the second time a competitor from the country advanced into the semi-finals of any Olympic event. In the semi-finals on 5 August, Sanneh achieved a Gambian national record of 10.18 seconds, but did not advance to the final after finishing eighth (and last) in her heat.

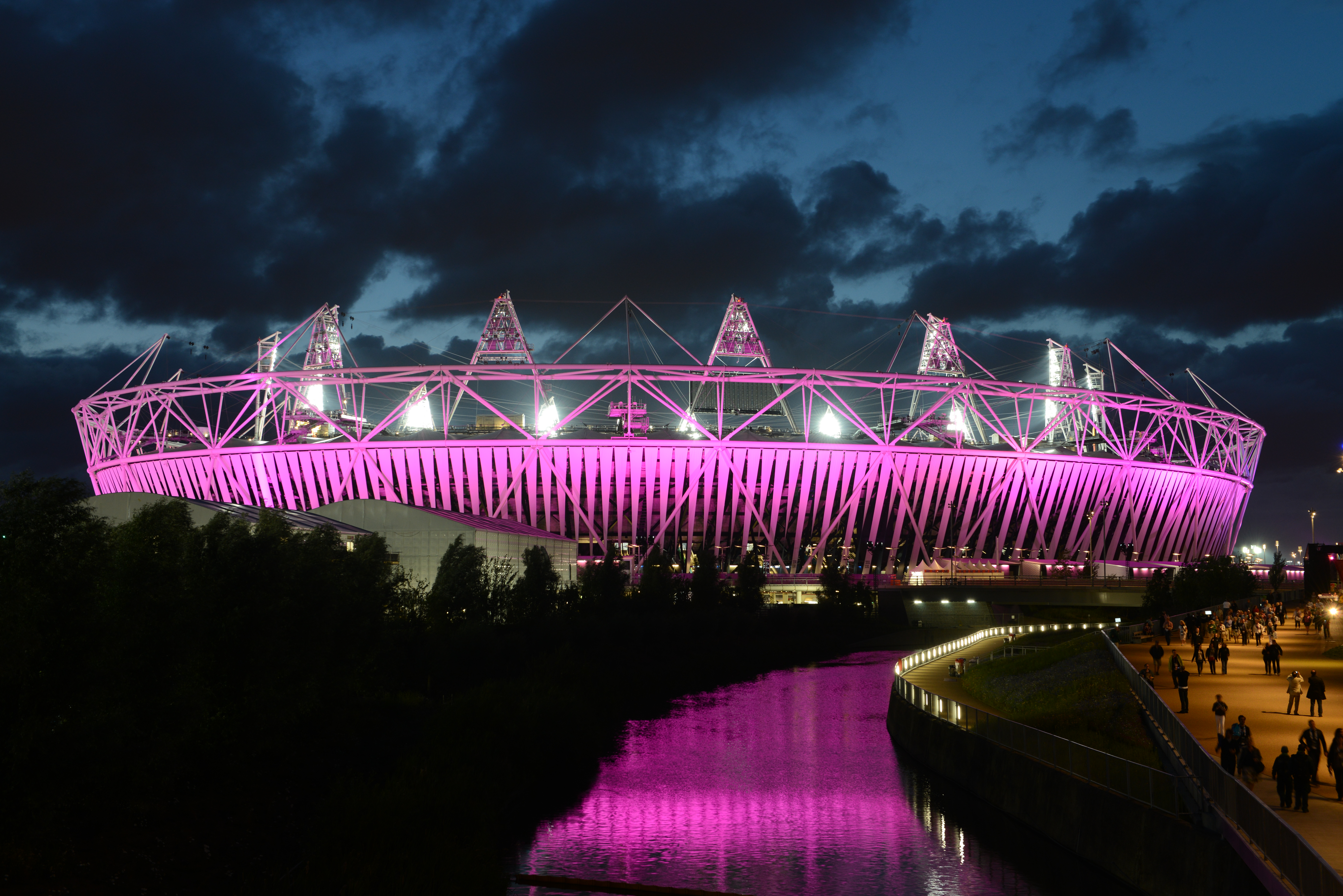
The London Olympic Stadium, where Sanneh and Colley competed in athletics events

Competing at her first Summer Olympics, Saruba Colley qualified for the London Games as a wildcard, as her best time for the 100 metres event, 12.37 seconds, set in the 2010 Commonwealth Games in New Delhi, was nearly one second slower than the "B" qualifying standard. She competed in the preliminary round on 3 August and was drawn in the fourth heat. Colley finished second with a time of 12.21 seconds, behind heat winner Toea Wisil from Papua New Guinea (11.60 seconds), advancing her to the quarter-finals. Colley was placed in heat three along with seven other athletes. She posted a time of 12.06 seconds, finishing eighth with a new national record. She finished 55th out of 56 athletes overall and did not qualify for the later rounds.

Key

- Note–Ranks given for track events are within the athlete's heat only
- Q = Qualified for the next round
- q = Qualified for the next round as a fastest loser or, in field events, by position without achieving the qualifying target
- NR = National record
- Bye = Athlete not required to compete in round

Men

Athlete	Event	Heat		Quarterfinal		Semifinal		Final	
Athlete	Event	Result	Rank	Result	Rank	Result	Rank	Result	Rank
Suwaibou Sanneh	100 m	Bye		10.21	5 q	10.18 NR	8	did not advance	

Women

Athlete	Event	Heat		Quarterfinal		Semifinal		Final	
Athlete	Event	Result	Rank	Result	Rank	Result	Rank	Result	Rank
Saruba Colley	100 m	12.21	2 Q	12.06 NR	8	did not advance			

== See also ==
- The Gambia at the 2012 Summer Paralympics
