= The Gambia at the 2000 Summer Olympics =

- Flag of the Gambia
- IOC code: GAM
- NOC: Gambia National Olympic Committee
- Website: www.gnoc.gm

in Sydney
- Competitors: 2 in 1 sport
- Flag bearer: Adama Njie
- Medals: Gold 0 Silver 0 Bronze 0 Total 0

Summer Olympics appearances (overview)
- 1984; 1988; 1992; 1996; 2000; 2004; 2008; 2012; 2016; 2020; 2024

The Gambia sent a delegation to compete at the 2000 Summer Olympics in Sydney, Australia from 15 September to 1 October 2000. This was the African nation's fifth time competing at a Summer Olympic Games. The Gambian delegation consisted of two track and field athletes, Pa Mamadou Gai and Adama Njie. Neither advanced beyond the first round heats of their events.

== Background ==
The Gambia National Olympic Committee was recognized by the International Olympic Committee on 1 January 1976. The nation boycotted the first two Summer Olympic Games held after their recognition. They boycotted the 1976 Summer Olympics over New Zealand's participation, and joined a United States-led boycott of the 1980 Moscow Olympics. Therefore, they did not make their Olympic debut until the 1984 Summer Olympics, and have participated in every Summer Olympics since then. Sydney was their fifth consecutive appearance at the Summer Games. The 2000 Summer Olympics were held from 15 September to 1 October 2000; a total of 10,651 athletes represented 199 National Olympic Committees. The Gambian delegation consisted of two track and field athletes, Pa Mamadou Gai and Adama Njie. The flag bearing duties at the opening ceremony were performed by Njie.

== Competitors ==
The following is the list of number of competitors in the Games.

| Sport | Men | Women | Total |
|---|---|---|---|
| Athletics | 1 | 1 | 2 |
| Total | 1 | 1 | 2 |

== Athletics ==
Pa Mamadou Gai was 22 years old at the time of the Sydney Olympics, and was making his second Olympic appearance, having previously represented The Gambia at the 1996 Summer Olympics. On 22 September, he participated in the first round of the men's 100 meters race, and was drawn into heat eight. He finished the race in 11.03 seconds, eighth out of nine competitors in his heat, and was eliminated. The gold medal was eventually won in 9.87 seconds by Maurice Greene of the United States; the silver was won by Ato Boldon of Trinidad and Tobago, and the bronze was earned by Obadele Thompson of Barbados.

Adama Njie was 22 years old at the time of the Sydney Olympics, and was making the second of her three consecutive Olympic appearances; she had previously competed in the 1996 Atlanta Olympics, and would go on to represent The Gambia at the 2004 Summer Olympics. On 22 September, she participated in the first round of the women's 800 meters competition, and was drawn into heat five. She finished the race in a time of 2 minutes and 7.90 seconds, which put her sixth out of seven competitors in her heat, and she was eliminated. The gold medal was eventually won by Maria Mutola of Mozambique in 1 minute and 56.15 seconds; the silver medal was won by Stephanie Graf of Austria, and the bronze was earned by Kelly Holmes of Great Britain.

| Athlete(s) | Events | Heats | | Quarterfinals | | Semifinals | | Final | |
| Athlete(s) | Events | Result | Rank | Result | Rank | Result | Rank | Result | Rank |
|---|---|---|---|---|---|---|---|---|---|
| Pa Mamadou Gai | Men's 100 m | 11.03 | 8 | did not advance | | | | | |
| Adama Njie | Women's 800 m | 2:07.90 | 6 | N/A | | did not advance | | | |
