= The Gambia at the 1996 Summer Olympics =

- Flag of the Gambia
- IOC code: GAM
- NOC: Gambia National Olympic Committee

in Atlanta
- Competitors: 9 in 1 sport
- Flag bearer: Dawda Jallow
- Medals: Gold 0 Silver 0 Bronze 0 Total 0

Summer Olympics appearances (overview)
- 1984; 1988; 1992; 1996; 2000; 2004; 2008; 2012; 2016; 2020; 2024

The Gambia competed at the 1996 Summer Olympics in Atlanta, United States.

== Competitors ==
The following is the list of number of competitors in the Games.

Sport	Men	Women	Total
Athletics	8	1	9
Total	8	1	9

== Results by event ==
=== Athletics ===
==== Men ====
Track and road events

Athletes	Events	Heat Round 1		Heat Round 2		Semifinal		Final	
Athletes	Events	Time	Rank	Time	Rank	Time	Rank	Time	Rank
Pa Mamadou Gai	100 metres	10.72	78	did not advance					
Dawda Jallow	400 metres	46.73	40	did not advance					
Momodou Sarr; Dawda Jallow; Cherno Sowe; Pa Mamadou Gai	4 x 100 metres relay	41.80	30	N/A		did not advance			
Dawda Jallow; Momodou Drammeh; Lamin Drammeh; Assan John	4 x 400 metres relay	did not finish		N/A		did not advance			

Field events

Athlete	Event	Qualification		Final	
Athlete	Event	Result	Rank	Result	Rank
Ousman Sallah	Long jump	No mark		did not advance	

==== Women ====
Track and road events

Athletes	Events	Heat Round 1		Heat Round 2		Semifinal		Final	
Athletes	Events	Time	Rank	Time	Rank	Time	Rank	Time	Rank
Adama N'Jie	800 metres	did not finish		N/A		did not advance			
