= The Gambia at the 2024 Summer Olympics =

- IOC code: GAM
- NOC: Gambia National Olympic Committee

in Paris, France 26 July 2024 – 11 August 2024
- Competitors: 7 (4 men and 3 women) in 4 sports
- Flag bearers (opening): Faye Njie & Gina Bass
- Flag bearers (closing): Alasan Ann & Gina Bass
- Officials: Ebrima Jawara (chef de mission)
- Medals: Gold 0 Silver 0 Bronze 0 Total 0

Summer Olympics appearances (overview)
- 1984; 1988; 1992; 1996; 2000; 2004; 2008; 2012; 2016; 2020; 2024

The Gambia competed at the 2024 Summer Olympics in Paris from 26 July to 11 August 2024. It was the nation's eleventh consecutive appearance at the Summer Olympics.

== Administration ==
The Gambia National Olympic Committee, designates Ebrima Jawara, the President of Gambia Golf Association, as the team's chef de mission in Paris.

== Competitors ==
The following is the list of number of competitors in the Games.

Sport	Men	Women	Total
Athletics	1	2	3
Judo	1	0	1
Swimming	1	1	2
Taekwondo	1	0	1
Total	4	3	7

== Athletics ==
Gambian track and field athletes achieved the entry standards for Paris 2024, either by passing the direct qualifying mark (or time for track and road races) or by world ranking, in the following events (a maximum of 3 athletes each):

Key

- Note–Ranks given for track events are within the athlete's heat only
- Q = Qualified for the next round
- q = Qualified for the next round as a fastest loser or, in field events, by position without achieving the qualifying target
- NR = National record
- N/A = Round not applicable for the event
- Bye = Athlete not required to compete in round

Track & road events

Athlete	Event	Preliminary		Round 1		Repechage		Semifinal		Final	
Athlete	Event	Result	Rank	Result	Rank	Result	Rank	Result	Rank	Result	Rank
Ebrahima Camara	Men's 100 m	10.29	1 Q	10.21	4	Did not advance					
Gina Bass	Women's 100 m	Bye		11.01	1 Q	—N/a		11.10	3	Did not advance	
Gina Bass	Women's 200 m	—N/a		22.84	3 Q	Bye		22.64	4	Did not advance	
Sanu Jallow	Women's 800 m	—N/a		2:03.91 NR	7	2:04.44	6	Did not advance			

== Judo ==
The Gambia qualified one judoka for the following weight class at the Games. Faye Njie (men's lightweight, 73 kg) got qualified via continental quota based on Olympic point rankings.

Athlete	Event	Round of 32	Round of 16	Quarterfinals	Semifinals	Repechage	Final / BM	
Athlete	Event	Opposition Result	Opposition Result	Opposition Result	Opposition Result	Opposition Result	Opposition Result	Rank
Faye Njie	Men's –73 kg	Cases (ESP); L 00–10	Did not advance					

== Swimming ==
The Gambia sent two swimmers to compete at the 2024 Paris Olympics, through the allocation of universality places.

Athlete	Event	Heat		Semifinal		Final	
Athlete	Event	Time	Rank	Time	Rank	Time	Rank
Ousman Jobe	Men's 50 m freestyle	26.97	61	Did not advance			
Aminata Barrow	Women's 100 m breaststroke	1:15.12	36	Did not advance			

== Taekwondo ==
For the first time in history, The Gambia qualified one athlete to compete at the games. Alasan Ann qualified for Paris 2024 following his victory in the semifinal round in above 80 kg class, at the 2024 African Qualification Tournament in Dakar, Senegal.

Athlete	Event	Qualification	Round of 16	Quarterfinals	Semifinals	Repechage	Final / BM	
Athlete	Event	Opposition Result	Opposition Result	Opposition Result	Opposition Result	Opposition Result	Opposition Result	Rank
Alasan Ann	Men's +80 kg	Bye	Šapina (CRO); L 0–2	Did not advance				
