= The Gambia at the 2008 Summer Olympics =

- Flag of the Gambia
- IOC code: GAM
- NOC: Gambia National Olympic Committee
- Website: www.gnoc.gm

in Beijing
- Competitors: 3 in 2 sports
- Flag bearer: Badou Jack
- Medals: Gold 0 Silver 0 Bronze 0 Total 0

Summer Olympics appearances (overview)
- 1984; 1988; 1992; 1996; 2000; 2004; 2008; 2012; 2016; 2020; 2024; 2028

Gambia took part in the 2008 Summer Olympics, held in Beijing, China, from 8 to 24 August 2008. It was Gambia's seventh appearance in the summer Olympics since its debut in 1984. The Gambia team included three athletes; runners Suwaibou Sanneh and Fatou Tiyana as well as boxer Badou Jack. Jack, a middleweight at his first Olympics, was selected as flag bearer for both the opening and closing ceremonies. None of the Gambia athletes progressed further than the qualifying heats.

== Background ==
Gambia had participated in six previous Summer Olympics, between its debut in the 1984 Summer Olympics in Los Angeles, United States and the 2008 Summer Olympics in Beijing. At its debut, the country sent ten athletes to the games, all of whom competed in athletics. As of 2012, 10 remains the largest number of Gambian athletes participating in the summer games. No Gambian has ever won a summer Olympics medal. Three athletes from Gambia were selected to compete in the 2008 Olympics: Suwaibou Sanneh in the men's track and field 100 metres, Fatou Tiyana in the women's track and field 100 metres and Badou Jack in the men's middleweight boxing competition.

== Athletics ==
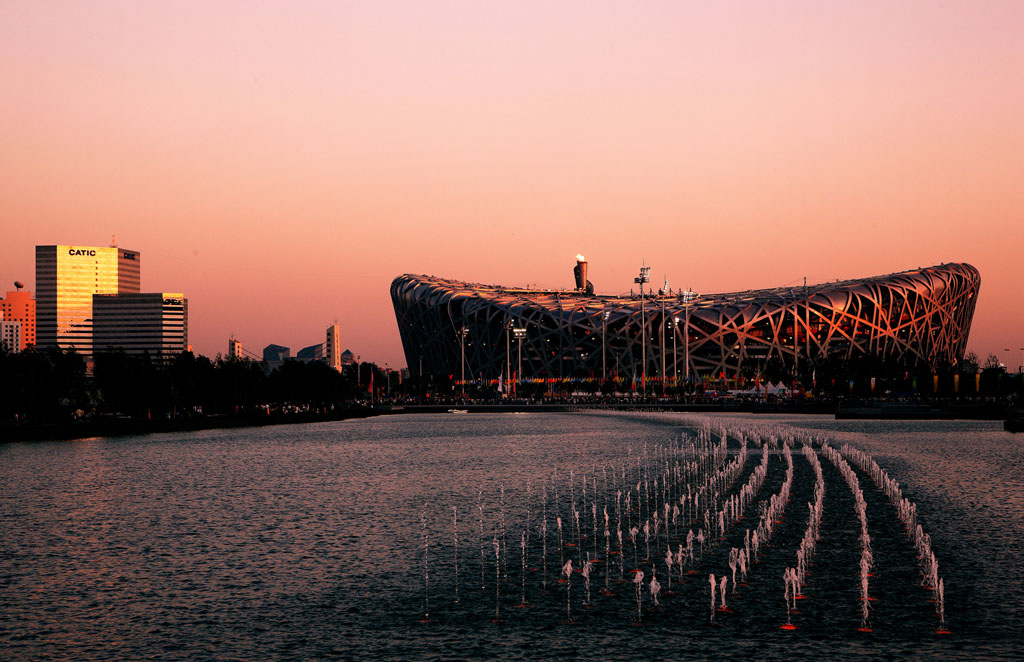
The Beijing National Stadium, where Sanneh and Tiyana competed in track and field events.

At the 2008 Olympics, Gambia was represented by one male athlete in athletics, 100 metres sprinter Suwaibou Sanneh. At age 17, Sanneh was the country's youngest competitor, and was competing at his first Olympics. He competed on 15 August in Beijing, and finished 5th out of 8 in heat eight. His time of 10.52 seconds placed him 46th out of 80 competitors overall. The fastest athlete was Tyrone Edgar (10.13 seconds) and the slowest athlete that progressed to the semi-finals was Uchenna Emedolu (10.46 seconds). Youssouf, who was 0.06 seconds behind Emedolu, did not progress to the semi-finals.

Competing at her first Olympics, Fatou Tiyana was the only female competing in the track and field events at the 2008 Summer Olympics for Gambia. She competed in the 100 meters on 19 August. Tiyana was drawn into heat seven for the event. She ran a personal best time of 12.25 seconds and finished seventh in her heat, 0.92 seconds behind the winner, Ivet Lalova. She finished 58th out of 85 athletes overall and was 2.55 seconds faster than the slowest athlete, Robina Muqimyar. Tiyana was 1.12 seconds behind the fastest athlete (Oludamola Osayomi) and 0.60 seconds behind the slowest athlete who progressed to the semi-finals, Thi Huong Vu. Therefore, Tiyana did not progress to the semi-finals.

Men

Athlete	Event	Heat		Quarterfinal		Semifinal		Final	
Athlete	Event	Result	Rank	Result	Rank	Result	Rank	Result	Rank
Suwaibou Sanneh	100 m	10.52	5	Did not advance					

Women

Athlete	Event	Heat		Quarterfinal		Semifinal		Final	
Athlete	Event	Result	Rank	Result	Rank	Result	Rank	Result	Rank
Fatou Tiyana	100 m	12.25	7	Did not advance					

== Boxing ==
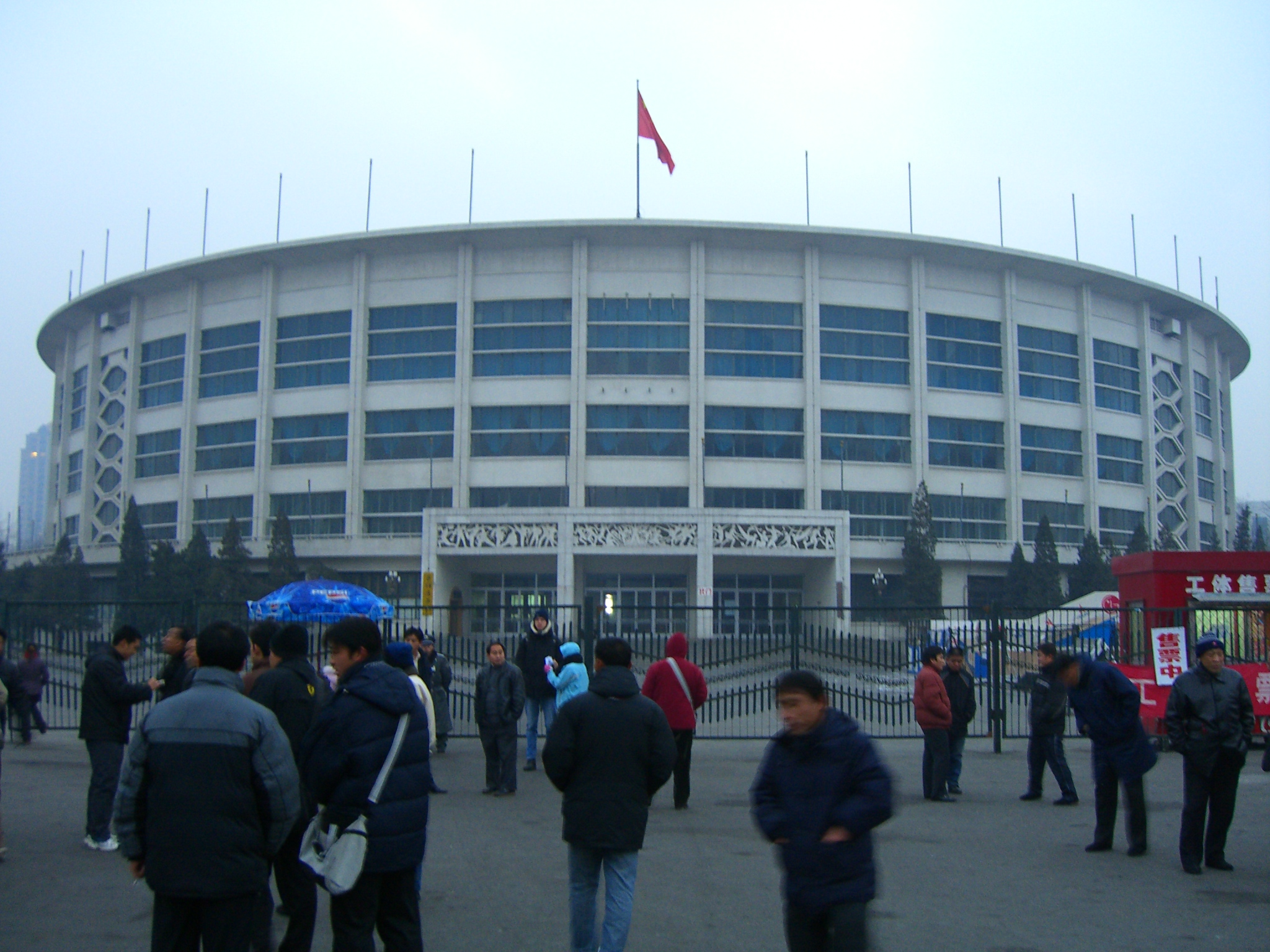
The Workers Indoor Arena, where Jack competed in his boxing bout.

Gambia's only boxer at the Beijing Olympics, Badou Jack, qualified in the middleweight class at the second African continental qualifying tournament. Jack competed at age 24 and was Gambia's oldest competitor. He was selected as the Gambian flag bearer for the opening ceremony. His first fight was against Indian Vijender Singh. Kumar won the fight 13-2 and Jack was eliminated from the competition.

Athlete	Event	Round of 32	Round of 16	Quarterfinals	Semifinals	Final	
Athlete	Event	Opposition Result	Opposition Result	Opposition Result	Opposition Result	Opposition Result	Rank
Badou Jack	Middleweight	Singh (IND); L 2–13	Did not advance				
