= Athletics at the 2020 Summer Olympics – Women's 100 metres =

Women's 100 metres at the Games of the XXXII Olympiad
- Olympic Athletics
- Venue: Japan National Stadium
- Dates: 30 July 2021 (preliminary & heats); 31 July 2021 (semifinals & final)
- Competitors: 71 from 55 nations
- Winning time: 10.61 s OR

Medalists
| 1st place, gold medalist(s) | | Elaine Thompson-Herah | Jamaica |
| 2nd place, silver medalist(s) | | Shelly-Ann Fraser-Pryce | Jamaica |
| 3rd place, bronze medalist(s) | | Shericka Jackson | Jamaica |

The women's 100 metres event at the 2020 Summer Olympics took place on 30 and 31 July 2021 at the Japan National Stadium. 71 athletes from 55 nations competed at the event.

The defending champion, Elaine Thompson-Herah, won the event in 10.61 secs, to break Florence Griffith Joyner's 33-year-old Olympic record. This was her third Olympic gold medal. The silver medal went to 2016 bronze medalist and the 2008 and 2012 champion in this event, Shelly-Ann Fraser-Pryce, while Shericka Jackson won the bronze medal, completing the podium sweep for Jamaica. The winning margin was 0.13 seconds. The winner had the sixth fastest reaction time in the final.

== Summary ==
Early in May, two time Olympic Champion Shelly-Ann Fraser-Pryce made a categorical statement that her career is not over. Thirteen years after her first gold medal, she ran not only her personal best, but the number 2 mark of all time 10.63. She took the Jamaican Olympic Trials, while the defending Olympic Champion Elaine Thompson-Herah didn't show the same kind of form, finishing as the last qualifier in third place. At the U.S. Trials, Sha'Carri Richardson ran 10.86 potentially setting up a close race in Tokyo until Richardson was taken out of the competition after a drug test came up positive for cannabis.

The heats revealed Marie-Josée Ta Lou was ready to be in the mix, setting the African record at 10.78 to lead the round. Fraser-Pryce led the semi-final round at 10.73 over Thompson-Herah. Ta-Lou and Jamaican Trials runner-up Shericka Jackson were all under 10.80. Daryll Neita was the final qualifier at 10.992, while Michelle-Lee Ahye missed the final with 10.993.

Fraser-Pryce is known for her fast starts. In the final she was out well, but Thompson-Herah was out quickly with her. By 30 metres, Thompson-Herah took the lead, with Jackson and Ta Lou battling for bronze. From there Thompson-Herah separated from Fraser-Pryce. Jackson separated from Ta Lou and gained on Fraser-Pryce. Three metres out from the finish, Thompson-Herah held up her left arm celebrating a clear victory. Fraser-Pryce had too much of a lead for Jackson to reach her but she completed the sweep for Jamaica, the trio .15 ahead of the next competitor Ta Lou. Thompson-Herah's 10.61 was not just a clear victory, it was a .09 improvement on her personal best. It beat Florence Griffith Joyner's 1988 Olympic Record and tied Griffith Joyner's second fastest race ever while displacing Fraser-Pryce from the number 2 position on the all-time list.

Thompson-Herah joined Wyomia Tyus, Gail Devers and Fraser-Pryce as the only women to defend their 100 metres title. By winning the silver medal, Fraser-Pryce became the first person, man or woman, to win 4 Olympic medals in the blue-ribbon event of the 100m.

== Background ==
This was the 22nd time the event was held, since women's athletics were introduced in 1928.

== Qualification ==
A National Olympic Committee (NOC) could enter up to 3 qualified athletes in the women's 100 metres event if all athletes meet the entry standard or qualify by ranking during the qualifying period. (The limit of 3 has been in place since the 1930 Olympic Congress.) The qualifying standard is 11.15 seconds. This standard was "set for the sole purpose of qualifying athletes with exceptional performances unable to qualify through the IAAF World Rankings pathway." The world rankings, based on the average of the best five results for the athlete over the qualifying period and weighted by the importance of the meet, will then be used to qualify athletes until the cap of 56 is reached.

The qualifying period was originally from 1 May 2019 to 29 June 2020. Due to the COVID-19 pandemic, the period was suspended from 6 April 2020 to 30 November 2020, with the end date extended to 29 June 2021. The world rankings period start date was also changed from 1 May 2019 to 30 June 2020; athletes who had met the qualifying standard during that time were still qualified, but those using world rankings would not be able to count performances during that time. The qualifying time standards could be obtained in various meets during the given period that have the approval of the IAAF. Only outdoor meets were eligible for the sprints and short hurdles, including the 100 metres. The most recent Area Championships may be counted in the ranking, even if not during the qualifying period.

NOCs can also use their universality place—each NOC can enter one female athlete regardless of time if they had no female athletes meeting the entry standard for an athletics event—in the 100 metres.

== Competition format ==
The event continued to use the preliminaries plus three main rounds format introduced in 2012. Athletes not meeting the qualification standard (that is, were entered through universality places) will compete in the preliminaries; those who met the standard started in the first round.

== Records ==
Prior to this competition, the existing global and area records were as follows:

| World record | Florence Griffith Joyner (USA) | 10.49 s | Indianapolis, United States | 16 July 1988 |
| Olympic record | Florence Griffith Joyner (USA) | 10.62 s | Seoul, South Korea | 24 September 1988 |
| World Leading | Shelly-Ann Fraser-Pryce (JAM) | 10.63 s | Kingston, Jamaica | 5 June 2021 |

| Area | Time (s) | Wind | Athlete | Nation |
|---|---|---|---|---|
| Africa (records) | 10.78 | +1.6 | Murielle Ahouré | Ivory Coast |
| Asia (records) | 10.79 | +0.0 | Li Xuemei | China |
| Europe (records) | 10.73 | +2.0 | Christine Arron | France |
| North, Central America and Caribbean (records) | 10.49 WR | +0.0 | Florence Griffith Joyner | United States |
| Oceania (records) | 11.11 | +1.9 | Melissa Breen | Australia |
| Oceania (records) | 11.11 | +0.0 | Denise Robertson | Australia |
| South America (records) | 10.91 | -0.2 | Rosângela Santos | Brazil |

The following records were established during the competition:

| Date | Event | Athlete | Nation | Time | Record |
|---|---|---|---|---|---|
| 31 July | Final | Elaine Thompson-Herah | Jamaica | 10.61 | OR |

In the final, Elaine Thompson-Herah set the new Olympic record, improving Griffith Joyner's 1988 time by 0.01 seconds. This was the fourth oldest Olympic record in athletics.

The following national records were established during the competition:

| Nation | Athlete | Round | Time | Notes |
|---|---|---|---|---|
| Afghanistan | Kamia Yousufi | Preliminaries | 13.29 | |
| Malawi | Asimenye Simwaka | Preliminaries | 11.76 | |
| Malawi | Asimenye Simwaka | Round 1 | 11.68 | |
| Palestine | Hanna Barakat | Preliminaries | 12.16 | |
| Switzerland | Mujinga Kambundji | Round 1 | 10.95 | |
| Switzerland | Ajla del Ponte | Round 1 | 10.91 | |
| Ivory Coast | Marie-Josée Ta Lou | Round 1 | 10.78 | AR |
| The Gambia | Gina Bass | Round 1 | 11.12 | |
| Jamaica | Elaine Thompson-Herah | Final | 10.61 | OR |

== Schedule ==
All times are Japan Standard Time (UTC+9)

The women's 100 metres took place over two consecutive days.

| Date | Time | Round |
|---|---|---|
| Friday, 30 July 2021 | 9:00; 19:00 | Preliminaries; Round 1 |
| Saturday, 31 July 2021 | 19:00; 21:50 | Semifinals; Final |

== Results ==
=== Preliminaries ===
The preliminary round of the competition featured athletes who had not achieved the required qualifying time for the event. Athletes who had achieved that time received a bye into the first round proper.

Qualification rule: first 3 of each heat (Q) plus the fastest time (q) qualified.

==== Preliminary Heat 1 ====
| Rank | Lane | Athlete | Nation | Reaction | Time | Notes |
|---|---|---|---|---|---|---|
| 1 | 6 | Natacha Ngoye Akamabi | Republic of the Congo | 0.124 | 11.47 | Q, SB |
| 2 | 8 | Margaret Vanessa Barrie | Sierra Leone | 0.142 | 11.53 | Q, SB |
| 3 | 5 | Amya Clarke | Saint Kitts and Nevis | 0.155 | 11.67 | Q |
| 4 | 9 | Djénébou Danté | Mali | 0.169 | 12.12 | SB |
| 5 | 1 | Hadel Aboud | Libya | 0.126 | 12.70 | PB |
| 6 | 2 | Bashair Obaid Al-Manwari | Qatar | 0.142 | 13.12 | PB |
| 7 | 7 | Kamia Yousufi | Afghanistan | 0.157 | 13.29 | NR |
| 8 | 3 | Alba Mbo Nchama | Equatorial Guinea | 0.148 | 13.36 | PB |
| 9 | 4 | Amed Elna | Comoros | 0.161 | 14.30 | PB |
| | | | | Wind: +0.3 m/s | | |

==== Preliminary Heat 2 ====
| Rank | Lane | Athlete | Nation | Reaction | Time | Notes |
|---|---|---|---|---|---|---|
| 1 | 3 | Farzaneh Fasihi | Iran | 0.142 | 11.76 | Q |
| 2 | 8 | Azreen Nabila Alias | Malaysia | 0.168 | 11.77 | Q, PB |
| 3 | 4 | Mudhawi Al-Shammari | Kuwait | 0.167 | 11.82 | Q |
| 4 | 5 | Regine Tugade-Watson | Guam | 0.135 | 12.17 | SB |
| 5 | 7 | Charlotte Afriat | Monaco | 0.131 | 12.35 | |
| 6 | 9 | Silina Pha Aphay | Laos | 0.170 | 12.41 | SB |
| 7 | 6 | Hsieh Hsi-en | Chinese Taipei | 0.171 | 12.49 | PB |
| 8 | 2 | Sarswati Chaudhary | Nepal | 0.158 | 12.91 | SB |
| 9 | 1 | Yasmeen Al-Dabbagh | Saudi Arabia | 0.153 | 13.34 | |
| | | | | Wind: +0.5 m/s | | |

==== Preliminary Heat 3 ====
| Rank | Lane | Athlete | Nation | Reaction | Time | Notes |
|---|---|---|---|---|---|---|
| 1 | 9 | Joella Lloyd | Antigua and Barbuda | 0.179 | 11.55 | Q |
| 2 | 5 | Asimenye Simwaka | Malawi | 0.164 | 11.76 | Q, NR |
| 3 | 7 | Alvin Tehupeiory | Indonesia | 0.194 | 11.89 | Q, SB |
| 4 | 1 | Carla Scicluna | Malta | 0.152 | 12.11 | q |
| 5 | 4 | Hanna Barakat | Palestine | 0.164 | 12.16 | NR |
| 6 | 8 | Mazoon Al-Alawi | Oman | 0.191 | 12.35 | |
| 7 | 3 | Aissata Deen Conte | Guinea | 0.157 | 12.43 | PB |
| 8 | 6 | Matie Stanley | Tuvalu | 0.159 | 14.52 | PB |
| 9 | 2 | Houlèye Ba | Mauritania | 0.147 | 15.26 | PB |
| | | | | Wind: +0.8 m/s | | |

=== Heats ===
Qualification Rules: First 3 in each heat (Q) and the next 3 fastest (q) advance to the Semifinals.

Wind readings- Heat 1: -0.1 m/s; Heat 2: +0.1 m/s; Heat 3: -0.4 m/s; Heat 4: -0.3 m/s; Heat 5: +1.3 m/s; Heat 6: -0.1 m/s; Heat 7: -0.2 m/s

==== Heat 1 ====
| Rank | Lane | Athlete | Nation | Reaction | Time | Notes |
|---|---|---|---|---|---|---|
| 1 | 5 | Teahna Daniels | United States | 0.136 | 11.04 | Q |
| 2 | 4 | Dina Asher-Smith | Great Britain | 0.103 | 11.07 | Q |
| 3 | 8 | Murielle Ahouré | Ivory Coast | 0.132 | 11.16 | Q, SB |
| 4 | 7 | Ge Manqi | China | 0.149 | 11.20 | q |
| 5 | 6 | Salomé Kora | Switzerland | 0.146 | 11.25 | |
| 6 | 9 | Marije van Hunenstijn | Netherlands | 0.158 | 11.27 | SB |
| 7 | 2 | Joella Lloyd | Antigua and Barbuda | 0.173 | 11.54 | |
| 8 | 3 | Asimenye Simwaka | Malawi | 0.161 | 11.68 | NR |

==== Heat 2 ====
| Rank | Lane | Athlete | Nation | Reaction | Time | Notes |
|---|---|---|---|---|---|---|
| 1 | 7 | Elaine Thompson-Herah | Jamaica | 0.158 | 10.82 | Q |
| 2 | 5 | Mujinga Kambundji | Switzerland | 0.111 | 10.95 | Q, =NR |
| 3 | 6 | Tatjana Pinto | Germany | 0.164 | 11.16 | Q |
| 4 | 4 | Khamica Bingham | Canada | 0.156 | 11.21 | q |
| 5 | 3 | Rosângela Santos | Brazil | 0.180 | 11.33 | SB |
| 6 | 9 | Kelly-Ann Baptiste | Trinidad and Tobago | 0.150 | 11.48 | |
| 7 | 8 | Vittoria Fontana | Italy | 0.149 | 11.53 | |
| 8 | 2 | Alvin Tehupeiory | Indonesia | 0.189 | 11.92 | |

==== Heat 3 ====
| Rank | Lane | Athlete | Nation | Reaction | Time | Notes |
|---|---|---|---|---|---|---|
| 1 | 4 | Alexandra Burghardt | Germany | 0.133 | 11.08 | Q |
| 2 | 6 | Javianne Oliver | United States | 0.150 | 11.15 | Q |
| 3 | 9 | Anna Bongiorni | Italy | 0.147 | 11.35 | Q |
| 4 | 7 | Rhoda Njobvu | Zambia | 0.130 | 11.40 | (.394) |
| 5 | 8 | Liang Xiaojing | China | 0.159 | 11.40 | (.396) |
| 6 | 5 | Tristan Evelyn | Barbados | 0.125 | 11.42 | |
| 7 | 3 | Margaret Barrie | Sierra Leone | 0.148 | 11.45 | SB |
| 8 | 2 | Farzaneh Fasihi | Iran | 0.143 | 11.79 | |

==== Heat 4 ====
| Rank | Lane | Athlete | Nation | Reaction | Time | Notes |
|---|---|---|---|---|---|---|
| 1 | 4 | Marie-Josée Ta Lou | Ivory Coast | 0.161 | 10.78 | Q, =AR |
| 2 | 7 | Daryll Neita | Great Britain | 0.107 | 10.96 | Q, PB |
| 3 | 5 | Crystal Emmanuel | Canada | 0.148 | 11.18 | Q |
| 4 | 6 | Lorène Bazolo | Portugal | 0.134 | 11.31 | |
| 5 | 3 | Maja Mihalinec Zidar | Slovenia | 0.130 | 11.54 | SB |
| 6 | 9 | Ángela Tenorio | Ecuador | 0.137 | 11.59 | |
| 7 | 2 | Amya Clarke | Saint Kitts and Nevis | 0.153 | 11.71 | |
| - | 8 | Vitória Cristina Rosa | Brazil | - | DNS | - |

==== Heat 5 ====
| Rank | Lane | Athlete | Nation | Reaction | Time | Notes |
|---|---|---|---|---|---|---|
| 1 | 4 | Shelly-Ann Fraser-Pryce | Jamaica | 0.128 | 10.84 | Q |
| 2 | 5 | Ajla Del Ponte | Switzerland | 0.131 | 10.91 | Q, NR |
| 3 | 6 | Nzubechi Grace Nwokocha | Nigeria | 0.161 | 11.00 | Q, PB |
| 4 | 7 | Gina Bass | The Gambia | 0.134 | 11.12 | q, NR |
| 5 | 2 | Rafaéla Spanoudaki-Hatziriga | Greece | 0.133 | 11.45 | |
| 6 | 8 | Inna Eftimova | Bulgaria | 0.145 | 11.46 | |
| 7 | 9 | Dutee Chand | India | 0.148 | 11.54 | |
| 8 | 3 | Carla Scicluna | Malta | 0.178 | 12.16 | |

==== Heat 6 ====
| Rank | Lane | Athlete | Nation | Reaction | Time | Notes |
|---|---|---|---|---|---|---|
| 1 | 5 | Asha Philip | Great Britain | 0.110 | 11.31 | Q |
| 2 | 6 | Tynia Gaither | Bahamas | 0.141 | 11.34 | Q |
| 3 | 9 | Krystsina Tsimanouskaya | Belarus | 0.149 | 11.47 | |
| 4 | 8 | María Isabel Pérez | Spain | 0.151 | 11.51 | |
| 5 | 3 | Natacha Ngoye Akamabi | Republic of the Congo | 0.137 | 11.52 | |
| 6 | 2 | Azreen Nabila Alias | Malaysia | 0.173 | 11.91 | |
| - | 7 | Blessing Okagbare | Nigeria | ~~0.147~~ | ~~11.05~~ | DQ |

In 2022, Blessing Okagbare was retrospectively disqualified from the games for anti-doping rule violations.

==== Heat 7 ====
| Rank | Lane | Athlete | Nation | Reaction | Time | Notes |
|---|---|---|---|---|---|---|
| 1 | 6 | Michelle-Lee Ahye | Trinidad and Tobago | 0.123 | 11.06 | Q |
| 2 | 5 | Shericka Jackson | Jamaica | 0.170 | 11.07 | Q |
| 3 | 7 | Jenna Prandini | United States | 0.148 | 11.11 | =SB, Q |
| 4 | 8 | Diana Vaisman | Israel | 0.132 | 11.27 | SB |
| 5 | 4 | Hana Basic | Australia | 0.147 | 11.32 | |
| 6 | 2 | Wei Yongli | China | 0.174 | 11.48 | SB |
| 7 | 9 | Jasmine Abrams | Guyana | 0.148 | 11.49 | |
| 8 | 3 | Mudhawi Al-Shammari | Kuwait | 0.167 | 11.81 | |

=== Semi-finals ===
Qualification Rules: First 2 in each heat (Q) and the next 2 fastest (q) advance to the final.

Wind readings- Heat 1: +0.0 m/s; Heat 2: -0.2 m/s; Heat 3: +0.3 m/s

==== Semifinal 1 ====
| Rank | Lane | Athlete | Nation | Reaction | Time | Notes |
|---|---|---|---|---|---|---|
| 1 | 4 | Elaine Thompson-Herah | Jamaica | 0.157 | 10.76 | Q |
| 2 | 6 | Ajla Del Ponte | Switzerland | 0.109 | 11.01 | Q |
| 3 | 7 | Dina Asher-Smith | Great Britain | 0.148 | 11.05 | |
| 4 | 8 | Jenna Prandini | United States | 0.149 | 11.11 | =SB |
| 5 | 2 | Khamica Bingham | Canada | 0.150 | 11.22 | |
| 6 | 3 | Tynia Gaither | Bahamas | 0.130 | 11.31 | |
| 7 | 9 | Tatjana Pinto | Germany | 0.163 | 11.35 | |
| — | 5 | Blessing Okagbare | Nigeria | — | — | DNSDQ |

Notes: Blessing Okagbare did not start as she was issued with a provisional suspension announced on the day of the race for failing a doping test held shortly before to the Olympics. She was later disqualified and issued with an 11-year ban for multiple doping violations.

==== Semifinal 2 ====
| Rank | Lane | Athlete | Nation | Reaction | Time | Notes |
|---|---|---|---|---|---|---|
| 1 | 5 | Marie-Josée Ta Lou | Ivory Coast | 0.147 | 10.79 | (.784), Q |
| 2 | 6 | Shericka Jackson | Jamaica | 0.147 | 10.79 | (.787), Q |
| 3 | 4 | Michelle-Lee Ahye | Trinidad and Tobago | 0.132 | 11.00 | SB |
| 4 | 7 | Alexandra Burghardt | Germany | 0.151 | 11.07 | |
| 5 | 9 | Javianne Oliver | United States | 0.166 | 11.08 | |
| 6 | 2 | Crystal Emmanuel | Canada | 0.149 | 11.21 | |
| 7 | 3 | Ge Manqi | China | 0.145 | 11.22 | |
| 8 | 8 | Asha Philip | Great Britain | 0.134 | 11.30 | |

==== Semifinal 3 ====
| Rank | Lane | Athlete | Nation | Reaction | Time | Notes |
|---|---|---|---|---|---|---|
| 1 | 5 | Shelly-Ann Fraser-Pryce | Jamaica | 0.136 | 10.73 | Q |
| 2 | 7 | Mujinga Kambundji | Switzerland | 0.128 | 10.96 | Q |
| 3 | 6 | Teahna Daniels | United States | 0.144 | 10.98 | q, PB |
| 4 | 4 | Daryll Neita | Great Britain | 0.135 | 11.00 | q |
| 5 | 9 | Nzubechi Grace Nwokocha | Nigeria | 0.142 | 11.07 | |
| 6 | 2 | Gina Bass | The Gambia | 0.140 | 11.16 | |
| 7 | 8 | Murielle Ahouré | Ivory Coast | 0.124 | 11.28 | |
| 8 | 3 | Anna Bongiorni | Italy | 0.159 | 11.38 | |

=== Final ===
Wind reading: -0.6 m/s

| Rank | Lane | Athlete | Nation | Reaction | Time | Notes |
|---|---|---|---|---|---|---|
| 1st place, gold medalist(s) | 4 | Elaine Thompson-Herah | Jamaica | 0.150 | 10.61 | OR, NR |
| 2nd place, silver medalist(s) | 5 | Shelly-Ann Fraser-Pryce | Jamaica | 0.139 | 10.74 | |
| 3rd place, bronze medalist(s) | 7 | Shericka Jackson | Jamaica | 0.152 | 10.76 | PB |
| 4 | 6 | Marie-Josée Ta Lou | Ivory Coast | 0.158 | 10.91 | |
| 5 | 8 | Ajla Del Ponte | Switzerland | 0.129 | 10.97 | |
| 6 | 9 | Mujinga Kambundji | Switzerland | 0.138 | 10.99 | |
| 7 | 3 | Teahna Daniels | United States | 0.144 | 11.02 | |
| 8 | 2 | Daryll Neita | Great Britain | 0.108 | 11.12 | |
