= The Gambia at the Commonwealth Games =

- Flag of the Gambia
- CG code: GAM
- CGA: The Gambia National Olympic Committee
- Website: gambianoc.gm
- Medals: Gold 0 Silver 1 Bronze 2 Total 3

Commonwealth Games appearances (overview)
- 1970; 1974; 1978; 1982; 1986; 1990; 1994; 1998; 2002; 2006; 2010; 2014; 2018; 2022; 2026; 2030

The Gambia has sent a team to every Commonwealth Games from 1970 except the boycotted 1986 Games. The only medal for the Gambia was won in their first appearance in 1970, a bronze by Sheikh Tidiane Faye in the men's high jump.

The Gambia withdrew from the Commonwealth in October 2013, so it was not represented at the 2014 Commonwealth Games in Glasgow, Scotland.

The Gambia returned to the Commonwealth on 8 February 2018, as Adama Barrow had promised to do as part of his campaign in 2016 in which he was elected as the third President of the Gambia.

A team from The Gambia competed at the 2018 Commonwealth Games, having been restored to its membership of the Commonwealth Games Federation on 31 March 2018.

== Medals ==
Games	Gold	Silver	Bronze	Total
1970 Edinburgh	0	0	1	1
1974 Christchurch	0	0	0	0
1978 Edmonton	0	0	0	0
1982 Brisbane	0	0	0	0
1986 Edinburgh	did not attend			
1990 Auckland	0	0	0	0
1994 Victoria	0	0	0	0
1998 Kuala Lumpur	0	0	0	0
2002 Manchester	0	0	0	0
2006 Melbourne	0	0	0	0
2010 Delhi	0	0	0	0
2014 Glasgow	did not attend			
2018 Gold Coast	0	0	0	0
2022 Birmingham	0	1	0	1
2026 Glasgow	0	0	1	1
Total	0	1	2	3

== Medallists ==
Medal	Name	Games	Sport	Event	Ref.
Silver	Faye Njie	2022 Birmingham	Judo	Men's 73 kg	
Bronze	Sheikh Faye	1970 Edinburgh	Athletics	Men's high jump	
Bronze	Faye Njie	2026 Glasgow	Judo	Men's 73 kg	
