= The Gambia at the 1992 Summer Olympics =

- Flag of the Gambia
- IOC code: GAM
- NOC: Gambia National Olympic Committee

in Barcelona
- Competitors: 5 in 1 sport
- Flag bearer: Dawda Jallow
- Medals: Gold 0 Silver 0 Bronze 0 Total 0

Summer Olympics appearances (overview)
- 1984; 1988; 1992; 1996; 2000; 2004; 2008; 2012; 2016; 2020; 2024

The Gambia competed at the 1992 Summer Olympics in Barcelona, Spain.

== Competitors ==
The following is the list of number of competitors in the Games.

Sport	Men	Women	Total
Athletics	5	0	5
Total	5	0	5

== Athletics ==
Key

- Note–Ranks given for track events are within the athlete's heat only
- Q = Qualified for the next round
- q = Qualified for the next round as a fastest loser or, in field events, by position without achieving the qualifying target
- NR = National record
- N/A = Round not applicable for the event
- Bye = Athlete not required to compete in round

Men
Track & road events

Athlete	Event	Heat		Quarterfinal		Semifinal		Final	
Athlete	Event	Result	Rank	Result	Rank	Result	Rank	Result	Rank
Abdulieh Janneh	100 m	10.71	4	did not advance					
Lamin Marikong	200 m	22.33	6	did not advance					
Lamin Marikong	400 m	Disq		did not advance					
Momodou Bello N'Jie	1500 m	bye		n/a		4:13.52	7	did not advance	
Dawda Jallow; Momodou Sarr; Abdulieh Janneh; Lamin Marikong	4 × 100 m relay	40.98	6	n/a		did not advance			
