= The Gambia at the 2016 Summer Olympics =

- Flag of the Gambia
- IOC code: GAM
- NOC: Gambia National Olympic Committee
- Website: www.gnoc.gm

in Rio de Janeiro
- Competitors: 4 in 3 sports
- Flag bearer: Gina Bass
- Medals: Gold 0 Silver 0 Bronze 0 Total 0

Summer Olympics appearances (overview)
- 1984; 1988; 1992; 1996; 2000; 2004; 2008; 2012; 2016; 2020; 2024

The Gambia, officially the Republic of the Gambia, competed at the 2016 Summer Olympics in Rio de Janeiro, which was held from 5 to 21 August 2016. The country's participation at Rio marked its ninth appearance at the Summer Olympic Games since its début at the 1984 Summer Olympics. The delegation included two track and field athletes, Adama Jammeh and Gina Bass, who both qualified after meeting the qualification standards for their respective events, one judoka, Faye Njie, who made the Games through a quota place and one swimmer, Pap Jonga, who earned a universality place to enter the Games. The Gambia made their début appearances in the judo and swimming events. Bass was selected as the flag bearer for the opening and closing ceremonies. All four athletes were eliminated from the first rounds of their events.

== Background ==
The Gambia participated in nine Summer Olympic Games between its début at the 1984 Summer Olympics in Los Angeles, United States and the 2016 Summer Olympics in Rio de Janeiro, Brazil. No Gambian athlete has ever won a medal at the Olympics and the country has not debuted at the Winter Olympic Games. The Gambia participated in the Rio Olympic Games from 5 to 21 August 2016. The four athletes that were chosen to compete in the Rio Games were athletes Adama Jammeh and Gina Bass, judoka Faye Njie and swimmer Pap Jonga. Three of the team's competitors trained at the Centro di Preparazione Olimpica di Formia after The Gambia's NOC secured funding for overseas training. Along with the four athletes, the country's delegation consisted of the NOC development officer and team leader Alhagie Dodou Capi Joo, athletics coach Mariama Sallah Saine, and swimming coach Arfang Y. Jobe. Bass was selected as the flag bearer for both the opening and closing ceremonies.

== Athletics (track and field) ==
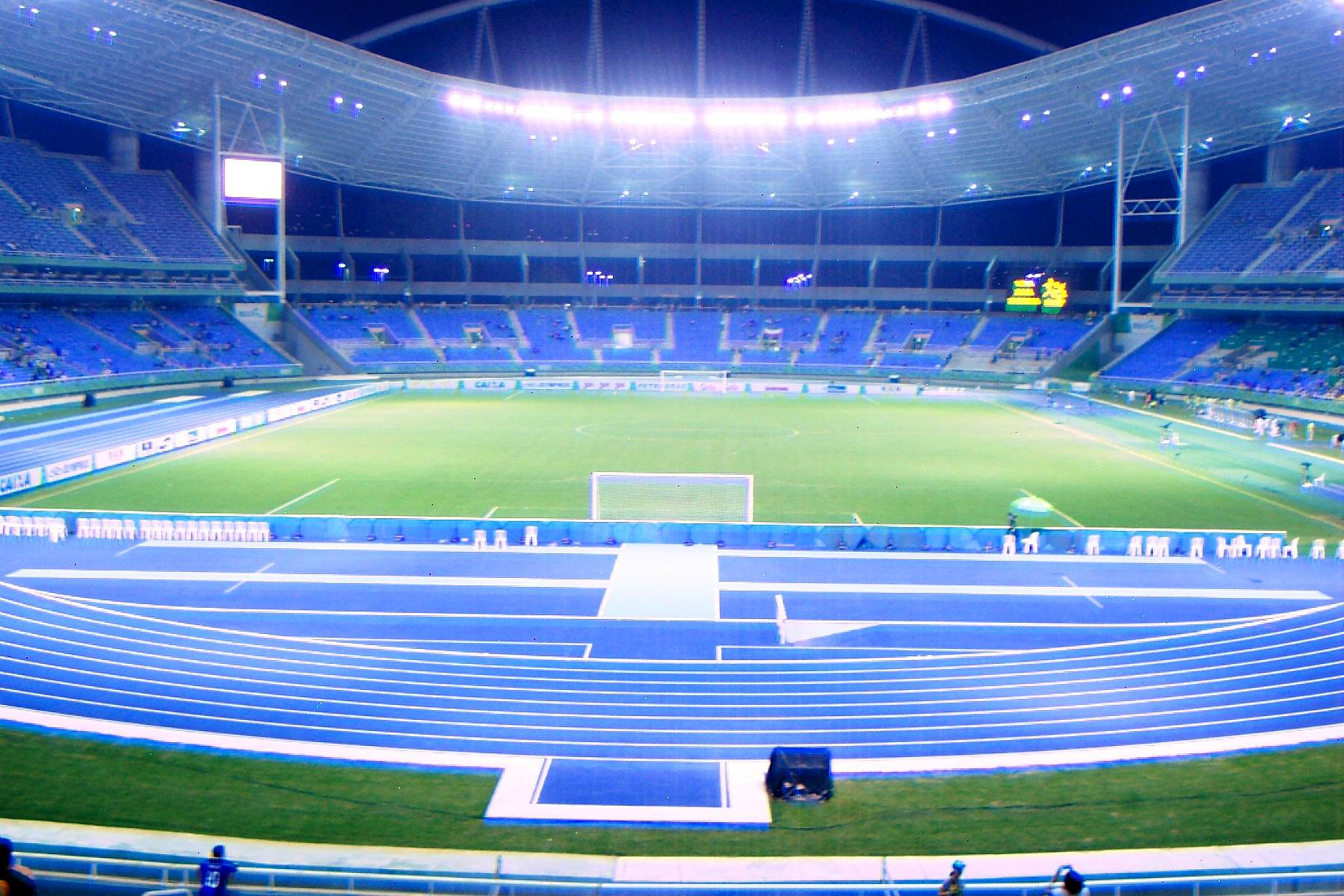
The Estádio Olímpico João Havelange, where Jammeh and Bass competed in track and field events.

Adama Jammeh was the oldest competitor to represent The Gambia at the Olympic Games at age 23. He had not participated in any previous Summer Games. Jammeh qualified for the Games because his fastest time of 20.45 seconds, set at the 2016 African Championships in Athletics Men's 200 metres, was 0.05 seconds faster than the required qualifying standard for his event, the men's 200 metres. In an interview with The Point before the Games he said, "I've competed at the World Athletics Championship in Beijing, China, and two African Championships and the Olympic Games will complete the set. I'm going to be so happy about it." Jammeh was drawn in the seventh heat on 16 August, finishing fifth out of eight athletes, with a time of 20.55 seconds. He finished 39th out of 75 participants overall, (Note: Two other athletes did not start, and one was disqualified.) and did not progress to the semi-finals because he was 0.26 seconds slower than the slowest athlete in his heat who made the event's later stages.

At the age of 21, Gina Bass was the only Gambian female competing in athletics and was making her début appearance in the quadrennial event. She secured qualification to the Games because her time of 23.14 seconds, recorded at the Edmar Stade Lama in Remire-Montjoly in June 2016, exceeded the qualifying standard for her event, the women's 200 metres. Bass was the first Gambian athlete to secure qualification for the Rio Olympics and the second in her country's history to achieve the feat. Before the Games she said that she was "excited and focused for the road ahead" and did not think that she would take part in the Olympics while growing up. Bass participated in the event's fifth heat on 15 August, finishing fifth out of eight runners, with a time of 23.43 seconds. Overall she finished 52nd out of 72 athletes and was unable to advance to the semi-finals after being 0.66 seconds slower than the slowest participant in her heat who progressed to the next round. After the Games Bass stated the lack of running she had beforehand was partially responsible for her finishing position.

Key

- Note–Ranks given for track events are within the athlete's heat only

Track & road events

| Athlete | Event | Heat | | Semifinal | | Final | |
| Athlete | Event | Result | Rank | Result | Rank | Result | Rank |
|---|---|---|---|---|---|---|---|
| Adama Jammeh | Men's 200 m | 20.55 | 5 | Did not advance | | | |
| Gina Bass | Women's 200 m | 23.43 | 5 | Did not advance | | | |

== Judo ==
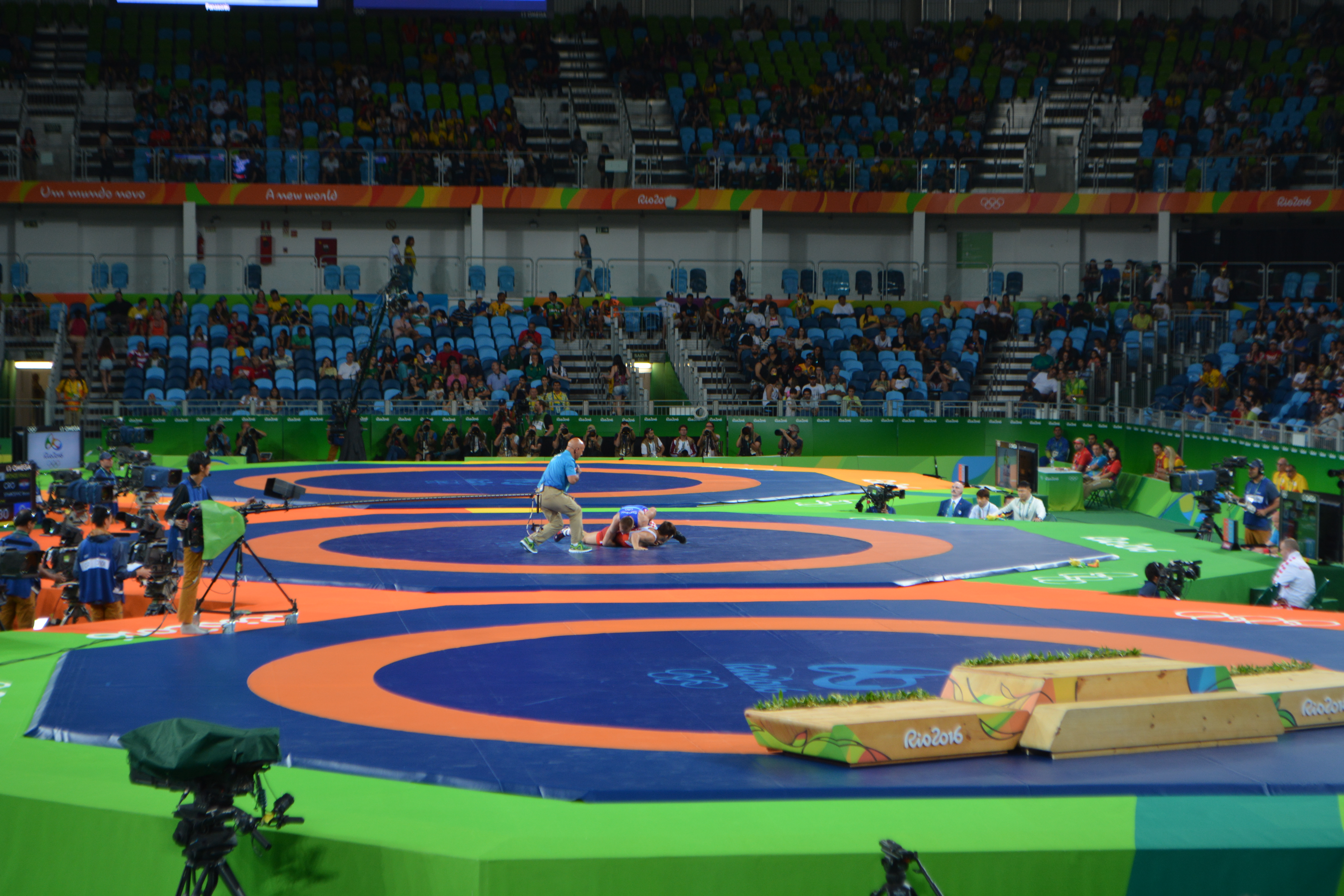
The Arena Carioca 2, where Njie participated in judo

Faye Njie represented The Gambia in men's judo. He gained qualification into the men's lightweight (73kg) judo competition by earning a continental quota place from the African region at the Rio Games during the 2016 African Judo Championships, signifying the country's first Olympic appearance in the sport. Before his event Njie said that he was proud to represent his country and commented his opponent was "good" but not undefeatable. He was narrowly defeated by his opponent Kazakhstan's Didar Khamza in a five-minute closely contested match on technical point.

| Athlete | Event | Round of 64 | Round of 32 | Round of 16 | Quarterfinals | Semifinals | Repechage | Final / BM | |
| Athlete | Event | Opposition Result | Opposition Result | Opposition Result | Opposition Result | Opposition Result | Opposition Result | Opposition Result | Rank |
|---|---|---|---|---|---|---|---|---|---|
| Faye Njie | Men's −73 kg | Khamza (KAZ); L 000–002 | Did not advance | | | | | | |

== Swimming ==
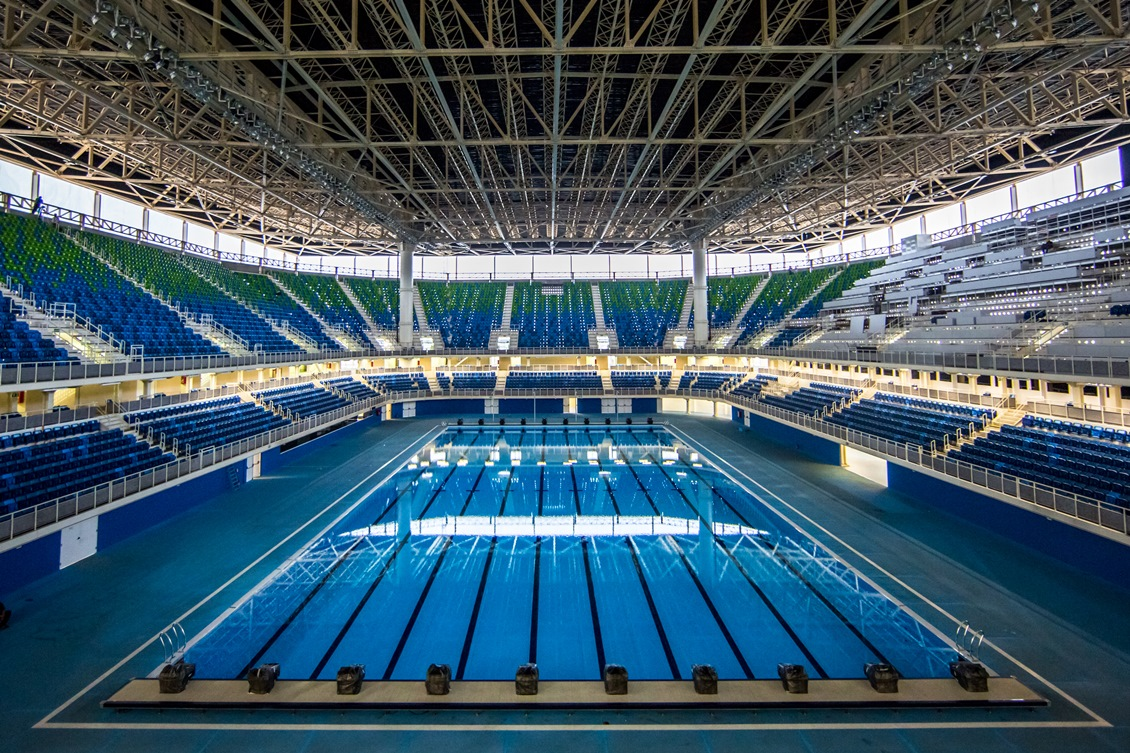
The Olympic Aquatics Stadium, where Jonga took part in swimming events.

Pap Jonga was the youngest athlete to represent The Gambia at the Rio Games at age 19. He had not participated in any previous Olympic Games. Jonga qualified for the Games by earning a universality place from swimming's governing body FINA because his fastest time of 27.24 seconds was 4.19 seconds slower than the required qualifying standard for his event, the men's 50 metre freestyle. He became the first Gambian swimmer to qualify for an Olympic event. He was drawn in the third heat on 11 August, finishing eighth (and last) of all competitors, with a time of 27.48 seconds. Jonga finished 79th out of 85 swimmers overall, (Note: One swimmer, Erik Risolvato, did not start.) and did not progress to the semi-finals after he was 6.38 seconds slower than the slowest competitor who advanced to the later stages.

| Athlete | Event | Heat | | Semifinal | | Final | |
| Athlete | Event | Time | Rank | Time | Rank | Time | Rank |
|---|---|---|---|---|---|---|---|
| Pap Jonga | Men's 50 m freestyle | 27.48 | 79 | Did not advance | | | |

== See also ==
- The Gambia at the 2016 Summer Paralympics
