= Beatrice Allen =

Vice president of the Gambia National Olympic Committee

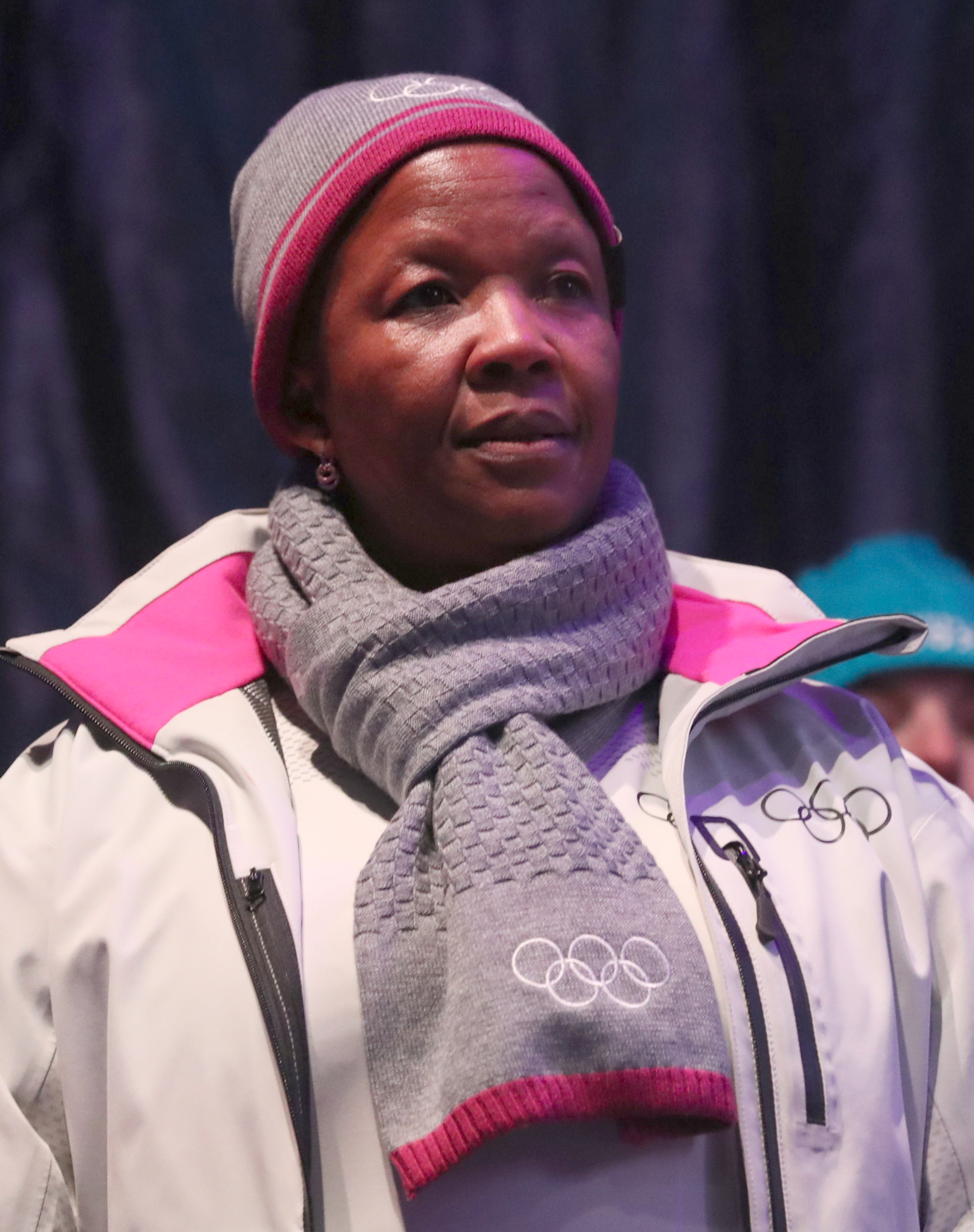
- Allen at the 2020 Winter Youth Olympics

Vice President of the Gambia National Olympic Committee
- Incumbent
- Assumed office June 2009

Personal details
- Born: 8 August 1950 (age 75)

Beatrice Allen (born 8 August 1950) has been the vice president of the Gambia National Olympic Committee since 2009 and a member of the International Olympic Committee starting in 2006. She has served as vice president of the World Baseball Softball Confederation (WBSC), one of the biggest international sports federations, since 2017.

== Early life and education ==
Beatrice Allen was born on 8 August 1950. Allen graduated with a Bachelor of Arts in international development and received subsequent diplomas in gender development and gender project execution.

== Career ==
Allen started her career at the United Nations Development Programme in 1974. In 1990, she was named an officer of the UNDP and remained in her position until 2002. Starting in 2006, Allen was named a member of the International Olympic Committee. During her time at the IOC, she was a member of multiple IOC commissions including the Women and Sport Commission and the organization of the 2016 Summer Olympics.

In June 2009, Allen was elected as the Gambia National Olympic Committee's vice president. Months later in November 2009, Allen was named interim president after GNOC's president Lang Tombong Tamba was arrested. Before the election to replace Tamba, she was charged for theft in 2011 and found not guilty.

In 2012, Allen awarded the medals at the 2012 Summer Olympics to the winners of the women's 400 metres event. Following her reelection to the IOC in 2014, Allen was selected onto various IOC committees including Olympic Education and Women in Sports. Other sports positions that Allen held for Gambia include head of the Gambia Softball Association and chair for the Special Olympics.

== Awards and honours ==
Allen was awarded a lifetime achievement award by the Sports Journalists Association of The Gambia in 2012 for her part in sports of The Gambia.
