= The Gambia at the 1988 Summer Olympics =

- Flag of the Gambia
- IOC code: GAM
- NOC: Gambia National Olympic Committee

in Seoul
- Competitors: 6 in 2 sports
- Flag bearer: Dawda Jallow
- Medals: Gold 0 Silver 0 Bronze 0 Total 0

Summer Olympics appearances (overview)
- 1984; 1988; 1992; 1996; 2000; 2004; 2008; 2012; 2016; 2020; 2024

The Gambia competed at the 1988 Summer Olympics in Seoul, South Korea. The Gambia sent 6 athletes, 5 male and 1 female to compete in two sports, athletics and wrestling.

== Competitors ==
The following is the list of number of competitors in the Games.

Sport	Men	Women	Total
Athletics	2	1	3
Wrestling	3	–	3
Total	5	1	6

== Athletics ==
The Gambia sent three athletes.

Men

Athlete(s)	Events	Heats		Quarterfinals		Semifinals		Final	
Athlete(s)	Events	Result	Rank	Result	Rank	Result	Rank	Result	Rank
Dawda Jallow	400 m	46.91	3	46.35	7	Did not advance			
Momodou N'Jie	800 m	1:55.57	7	Did not advance					

Women

Athlete(s)	Events	Heats		Quarterfinals		Semifinals		Final	
Athlete(s)	Events	Result	Rank	Result	Rank	Result	Rank	Result	Rank
Jabou Jawo	100 m	12.27	8	Did not advance					

== Wrestling ==
The Gambia sent three wrestlers.

Men's freestyle

Athlete	Event	Elimination Pool								Final round	
Athlete	Event	Round 1 Result	Round 2 Result	Round 3 Result	Round 4 Result	Round 5 Result	Round 6 Result	Round 7 Result	Rank	Final round Result	Rank
Adama Damballey	−74 kg	Iutaga (SAM); W 4-0 T	BYE	Sejdi (YUG); L 0-4 T	Rauhala (FIN); L 0-4 T	—			7	Did not advance	
Matarr Jarju	−82 kg	Iglesias (ARG); L 0-4 T	Ito (JPN); L 0-4 T	—					13	Did not advance	
Bakary Sanneh	−90 kg	Lins (AUT); L 0-4 T	Al-Shamy (SYR); L 0-4 T	—					13	Did not advance	
