= The Gambia at the 2010 Commonwealth Games =

- CGF code: GAM
- Competitors: 17

Commonwealth Games appearances (overview)
- 1970; 1974; 1978; 1982; 1986; 1990; 1994; 1998; 2002; 2006; 2010; 2014; 2018; 2022; 2026; 2030

The Gambia competed in the 2010 Commonwealth Games held in Delhi, India, from 3 to 14 October 2010. The Queen's baton traveled to the Gambia as part of the Queen's Baton Relay in anticipation of the games. The 2008 Commonwealth Games Federation General Assembly was hosted by Gambia, hosting members from the Commonwealth Games Associations. It sent 17 players.

== See also ==
- 2010 Commonwealth Games
