= Bakary Jarjue =

Gambian sprinter

Bakary Banana Jarjue
Personal information
- Nationality: Gambian
- Born: 3 June 1949 (age 77)

Sport
- Sport: Sprinting
- Event: 100 metres

Bakary Banana Jarjue (born 3 June 1949), also spelt as Bakary Jarju, (Note: Cited to the International Olympic Committee.) is a Gambian sprinter. Jarjue was initially entered for two relay events at the 1976 Summer Olympics though would not compete in either event. He would instead represent the Gambia at the 1978 Commonwealth Games and the 1982 Commonwealth Games, though would not medal in either event.

He would then compete at the 1983 World Championships in Athletics, again not medaling. Finally, he made his Olympic debut at the 1984 Summer Olympics for Gabon. He would compete in the men's 100 metres and was part of the men's 4 × 100 metres relay team. He would not medal in either event.

== Biography ==
Bakary Banana Jarjue was born on 3 June 1949. As a sprinter, he was entered to compete for the Gambia at the 1976 Summer Olympics in Montreal, Canada. He was set to be part of the men's 4 × 100 metres and men's 4 × 400 metres relay teams but did not start in either event. He would only start his career in 1977 and was the top ranked sprinter in Gambia the following year.

He would eventually represent the Gambia at the 1978 Commonwealth Games in Edmonton, Canada. His first event would be the men's 100 metres on 6 August. He would run in a time of 10.98 seconds and qualify for the quarterfinals. In the next round, he would run in a time of 10.91 seconds and not advance further. Two days later, he would compete in the men's 200 metres, though would run in a time of 22.10 seconds and not advance further. He would also be part of the men's 4 × 100 metres relay team and would finish last in the heats with a time of 43.17 seconds, not advancing further.

The following year, Jarjue would set a personal best in the 100 metres with a time of 10.3 seconds. He would also compete at the 1982 Commonwealth Games in Brisbane, Australia. He would first compete in the men's 100 metres on 3 October. In the heats, he would run in a time of 10.88 seconds and qualify for the quarterfinals. There, he would run in a time of 10.99 seconds and not advance further. He would also be part of the men's 4 × 100 metres relay team on 8 October, though they would place last in the heats with a time of 43.30 seconds.

His first and only appearance at the World Championships would be at the 1983 World Championships in Athletics in Helsinki, Finland, the first edition of the event. He would compete in the heats of the men's 100 metres on 7 August and run in a time of 11.04 seconds, not advancing further. At the 1984 Summer Olympics in Los Angeles, he would compete in his first and only Olympic Games. There, he would compete first in the heats of the men's 100 metres on 3 August. He would run in a time of 10.68 seconds and not advance to the quarterfinals. Furthermore, he was also part of the Gambian men's 4 × 100 metres relay team. The team would finish last in their heat with a time of 40.73 seconds and not advance further.

He had also competed in the All-Africa Games during his career. Jarjue would eventually retire from the sport in 1988. In 2010, he was admitted to The Gambia National Olympic Committee's sports merit list due to his service in sport.
