= Alvin Tehupeiory =

Indonesian sprinter

Personal information
- Nationality: Indonesian
- Born: 5 April 1995 (age 31) Hutumuri, Ambon, Maluku, Indonesia

Sport
- Sport: Athletics
- Events: 100 m, 200 m, 400 m, 400 m hurdles
Medal record
Women's athletics
Representing Indonesia
Arafura Games
Silver medal – second place	2011 Darwin	4x400 m relay open
Asian Junior Championships
Bronze medal – third place	2014 Taipei	400 m hurdles

Alvin Tehupeiory (born 5 April 1995) is an Indonesian sprinter.

From Maluku, Tehupeiory broke the 20 year old national record of Irene Joseph for the 200m in 2019, and was selected by the executive board of the All-Indonesia Athletics Association to fill their quota of athletes for the delayed 2020 Tokyo Olympics. She joined Lalu Muhammad Zohri as part of the Indonesian team.

She has been a multiple national champion in sprinting events at 100m, 200m and 400m hurdles. She won bronze medal at the 2014 Asian Junior Athletics Championships in the 400m hurdles.
