= Sheikh Omar Faye =

Gambian ambassador to Mauritania (born 1960)

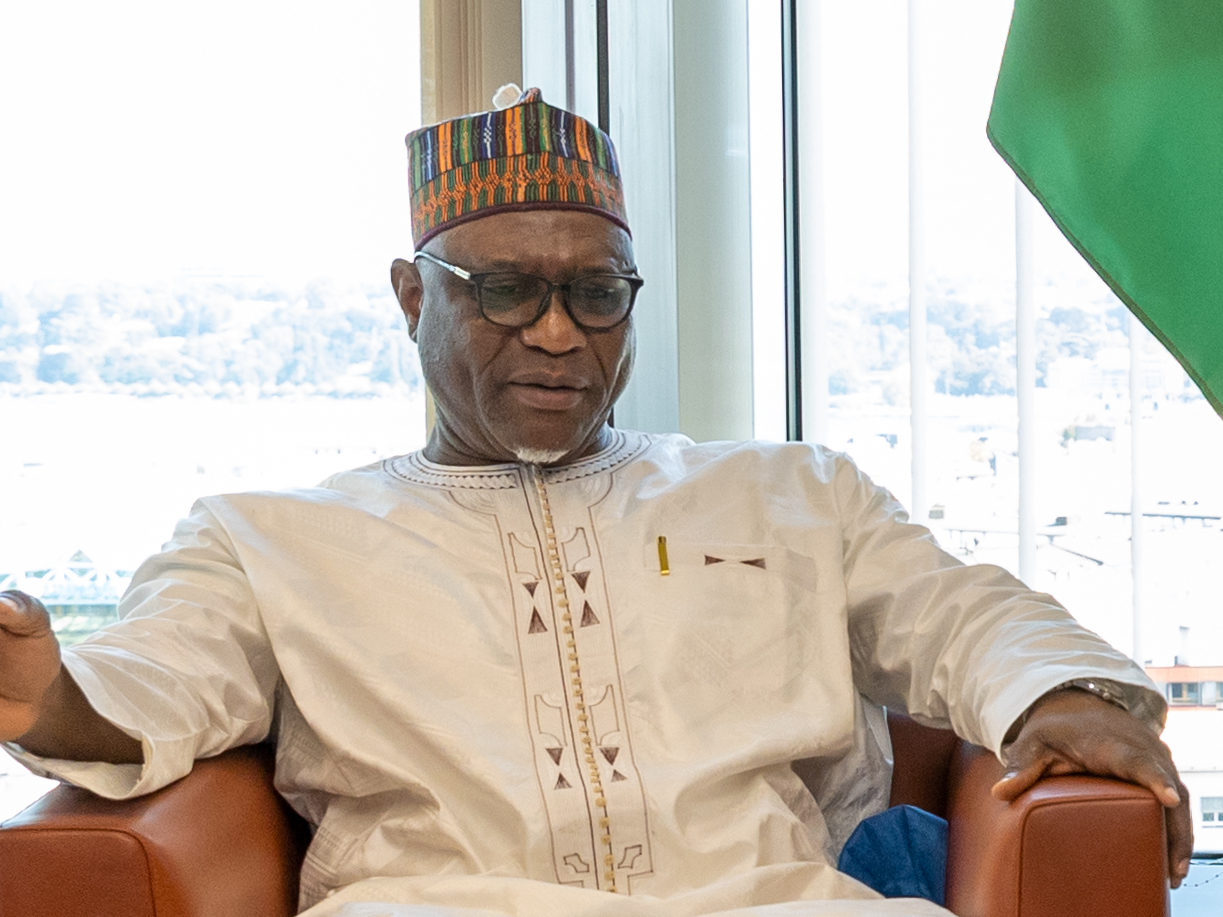
- Sheikh Omar Faye

Minister of Defence
- Incumbent
- Assumed office 22 August 2019
- President: Adama Barrow
- Preceded by: Position established

Gambian Ambassador to the United States
- In office 3 August 2015 – 19 December 2016
- President: Yahya Jammeh
- Preceded by: Neneh Macdouall-Gaye
- Succeeded by: Ebraima Manneh

Minister of Youth, Sports and Religious Affairs
- In office June 2006 – September 2007
- President: Yahya Jammeh
- Preceded by: Musa Mohammed

Personal details
- Born: 10 January 1960 (age 66) Banjul, the Gambia

Military service
- Allegiance: The Gambia
- Branch/service: Gambian National Army
- Years of service: 1983–1994
- Rank: Major

Sheikh Omar Faye (born 10 January 1960) is the Gambian ambassador to Mauritania. Prior to this position, he was Gambian Minister of Defence, as well as a former diplomat who served as the Gambian Ambassador to the United States from 2015 to 2016, and an athlete who represented the Gambia in the 1984 Olympic games.

== Early life and education ==
Faye was born on 10 January 1960 in Banjul, the Gambia, to Ajaratou Ramatoulie Tambedou and Alhagi Tijan Faye. His grandfather, also named Sheikh Omar Faye, was an Islamic scholar who was involved in Gambian politics in the early days of the country. The younger Faye attended Windley primary school in Half-Die, and Crab Island Junior Secondary School. He then attended St Augustine's High School on a sports scholarship, graduating in 1979. At St Augustine's, he competed in football, basketball, volleyball, rugby, and track.

== Career ==
=== Athlete ===
Faye began his career as an athlete and held the Gambian records in the 100m and 200m sprint for some time. He represented the Gambia internationally, including at the 1984 Olympic Games where he was the team captain. At the Games, he competed in the 100m and 200m races, as well as the 4 × 100 metres relay. He also played rugby for the Gambian national team at this time. Concurrently, from 1981 to 1983, he worked as a tutor at the Muslim High School in Banjul.

=== Military service ===
Faye joined the Gambian National Army in 1983 and became an officer cadet that year. In 1984, he was sent to Royal Military Academy Sandhurst to train for two years. Later in his army career, he also trained at the United States Army Command and General Staff College. Part of his service was spent as part of a peacekeeping force in Liberia. He left the army in 1994, and was in Atlanta, Georgia, at the time of Yahya Jammeh's coup. He worked as a security supervisor and utility line locator in the United States until 2005, when he returned to the Gambia.

=== Politics and diplomacy ===
Upon returning to the Gambia, Faye was appointed as Director of Information in the office of President Jammeh. He was appointed as Minister of Youth, Sports and Religious Affairs in 2006, and remained in that post until 2007 when he was sent to Mauritania as the deputy chief of mission at the Gambian embassy there. He remained in Mauritania until 2014, when he was sent to the Gambian embassy in Washington, D.C. He formally became the chargé d'affaires on 1 April 2014, and officially became the ambassador after presenting his credentials to President Barack Obama on 3 August 2015. On 19 December, he was recalled to the Gambia. This came after calling for Jammeh to step down following Adama Barrow's victory in the 2016 presidential election.

Faye was later appointed by the Barrow administration as the Deputy Head of Mission at the Gambian Embassy in Dubai, and most recently as the Consul General of the Gambian Consulate in Jeddah, Saudi Arabia, the primary consulate in charge of serving Muslim citizens of The Gambia on pilgrimage to Mecca for the Hajj.

=== Minister of Defence ===
While Faye was serving as Consul General in Jeddah, Saudi Arabia, President Barrow appointed Faye as the Gambia's first Minister of Defence under his administration. The appointment was made as part of a broader cabinet reshuffling announced via press release from the Office of the President on August 22, 2019.

== International competitions ==
Representing the Gambia
Year	Competition	Venue	Position	Event	Result	Wind (m/s)	Notes
1983	World Championships	Helsinki, Finland	5th (q)	100 m	10.76	+1.8	heat 2

Olympic Games
Preceded by First	Flagbearer for Gambia; Los Angeles 1984	Succeeded by Dawda Jallow
