= Saruba Colley =

Gambian sprinter (born 1989)

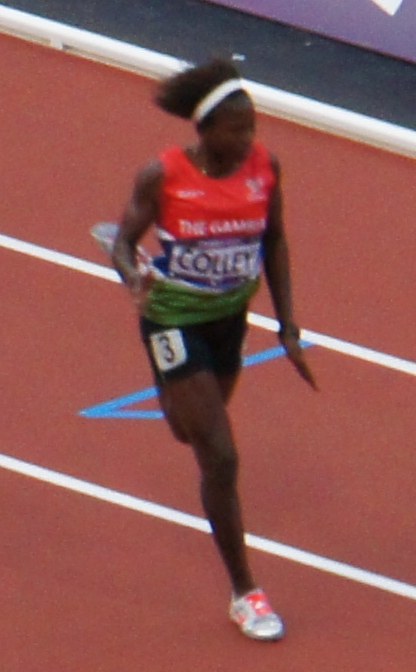
Saruba Colley at the 2012 Summer Olympics

Saruba Colley (born February 5, 1989, in Sibanor) is a Gambian sprinter. She competed in the 100 metres competition at the 2012 Summer Olympics; she ran the preliminaries in 12.21 seconds, qualifying her for Round 1, and Round 1 in 12.06 seconds, which set a Gambian national record but did not qualify her for the semifinals.
