= Adama Njie =

Gambian middle-distance runner

Personal information
- Full name: Adama Njie
- Born: 7 February 1978 (age 48) The Gambia
- Height: 163 cm (5 ft 4 in)
- Weight: 50 kg (110 lb)
Medal record
Women's athletics
Representing Gambia
African Championships
| Bronze medal – third place | 1996 Yaoundé | 800 m |

Adama Njie (or N'Jie; born 7 February 1978) is a retired Gambian middle-distance runner who specialised in the 800 metres. She represented her country in three Olympic Games and one Commonwealth Games, and was the flag-bearer for the Gambia at the 2000 Summer Olympics.

== 1996 ==
At the 1996 African Championships in Athletics, aged 18, Njie won a bronze medal in the women's 800 metres (with a time of 2:10.10). She was the first Gambian runner to win a medal at the championships for an individual performance, as the country's only other medal had come in the 4 × 100 metres relay (at the 1984 event). A few weeks after her medal at the African Championships, Njie was a member of the nine-athlete Gambian delegation at the 1996 Summer Olympics in Atlanta, as the only female competitor for her country. Her only race was the 800 metres, where she failed to finish the race. She was the third-youngest runner in the event, after Ethiopia's Kutre Dulecha and Yaznee Nasheeda of the Maldives.

== 1997–2000 ==
Running in the 800 metres at the 1997 World Championships in Athletics, Njie placed last in her heat and finished 31st in a field of 36 runners. She fared better in the 800 metres at the 1998 Commonwealth Games in Kuala Lumpur, placing 17th in a field of 25 runners where the top 16 qualified for the semi-finals. For the 2000 Summer Olympics in Sydney, Njie was one of only two Gambian athletes (along with Pa Mamadou Gai, and became the country's first female flag-bearer. She again ran the 800 metres, and finished second-last in her heat with a time of 2:07.90, which placed her 31st out of 37 runners overall.

== 2001–2004 ==
In the 800 metres at the 2001 World Championships in Athletics, Njie ran the slowest time in her heat and the fourth-slowest overall. She did improve at the 2003 World Championships, finishing over nine seconds slower than she had two years previous. At the 2004 Summer Olympics in Athens, Njie was again the only woman in the Gambian delegation. She was only invited to compete a month before the games were due to start, as another Gambian athlete, Mama Gassama, had been withdrawn. Njie placed last in her heat with a time of 2:10.02, more than ten seconds behind the heat winner, Maria Cioncan of Romania. However, she became the first Gambian woman to participate in three Olympic Games, with sprinter Jabou Jawo being the only other Gambian woman to have previously participated in multiple editions.

== See also ==
- The Gambia at the Olympics
- List of flag bearers for the Gambia at the Olympics
- 2000 Summer Olympics national flag bearers

Olympic Games
| Preceded by Dawda Jallow | Flagbearer for Gambia; Sydney 2000 | Succeeded by Jaysuma Saidy Ndure |
