= Suwaibou Sanneh =

Gambian sprinter

Personal information
- Nationality: Gambian
- Born: 30 October 1990 (age 35) Soma
- Height: 1.83 m (6 ft 0 in)
- Weight: 80 kg (176 lb)

Sport
- Country: Gambia
- Sport: Athletics
- Event: 100 metres

Achievements and titles
- Personal best: 100 m: 10.16 s
- Updated on 8 August 2012

Suwaibou Sanneh (born 30 October 1990) is a Gambian sprinter who specializes in the 100 metres. He was born in Soma. He set a personal best and national record time of 10.16 seconds during the Twilight Series Meet #3 on 30 May 2013 in New York City.

He reached the semi-final at the 2008 World Junior Championships and competed at the 2008 Olympic Games without progressing to the second round. Finishing fifth in his heat with a time of 10.52 seconds.

Sanneh competed at the 2012 Summer Olympics in the Men's 100m event and set a new Gambian record in the event with 10.21, managing to advance to the semifinals, where he again set the national Men's 100m record with 10.18, before being eliminated.

Olympic Games
Preceded by Badou Jack	Flagbearer for Gambia; London 2012	Succeeded by Gina Bass
