= Fatou Tiyana =

Gambian sprinter

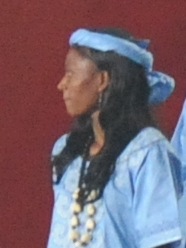

Fatou Tiyana (born February 24, 1987) is a track and field sprint athlete who competed internationally for the Gambian Olympic team.

Tiyana represented the Gambia at the 2008 Summer Olympics in Beijing. She competed at the 100 metres sprint and placed seventh in her heat without advancing to the second round. She ran the distance in a time of 12.25 seconds.
