= List of Gambian records in athletics =

The following are the national records in athletics in the Gambia maintained by the Gambia Athletics Association (GAA).

== Outdoor ==
Key to tables: Awaiting ratification Record not kept by GAA Not ratified or later rescinded by GAA

=== Men ===
Event	Record	Athlete	Date	Meet	Place	Ref.
100 m	9.98 (+1.9 m/s)	Ebrahima Camara	14 July 2024	Résisprint International	La Chaux-de-Fonds, Switzerland	
150 m	15.68 (+1.0 m/s)	Tijan Ketia	22 September 2020	Miting Ciutat de Barcelona	Barcelona, Spain	
200 m	20.45 (+1.8 m/s)	Adama Jammeh	26 June 2016	African Championships	Durban, South Africa	
400 m	45.48	Dawda Jallow	3 April 1993		Atlanta, United States	
600 m	1:16.54	Sampierre Gomez	26 June 2024	Avondmeeting	Gentbrugge, Belgium	
800 m	1:47.20	Edrissa Marong	20 April 2019	African U18 and U20 Championships	Abidjan, Ivory Coast	
1500 m	3:50.77	Ansu Sowe	25 August 2007	World Championships	Osaka, Japan	
3000 m	8:32.8 h	Nfamara Njie	18 April 2015		Lecce, Italy	
5000 m	14:11.13	Nfamara Njie	18 October 2020	Italian Championships	Modena, Italy	
10,000 m	29:24.43	Nfamara Njie	10 April 2022	Regional 10000m Championships	Correggio, Emilia-Romagna, Italy	
10 km (road)	29:51	Muhammad Lamin Bah	30 October 2022	1st Marathon Lleida 10k	Lleida, Spain	
10 km (road)	29:51	Nfamara Njie	6 October 2024	Arezzo 10	Arezzo, Italy	
15 km (road)
15 km (road)	49:49+	Muhammad Lamin Bah (Note: citizenship unclear; ESP by official result source)	16 March 2025	Barcelona Marathon	Barcelona, Spain	
20 km (road)
20 km (road)	1:06:17+	Muhammad Lamin Bah (Note: citizenship unclear; ESP by official result source)	16 March 2025	Barcelona Marathon	Barcelona, Spain	
Half marathon	1:04:20	Nfamara Njie	16 February 2020	Gensan Giulietta & Romeo Half Marathon	Verona, Italy	
25 km (road)
25 km (road)	1:22:47+	Muhammad Lamin Bah (Note: citizenship unclear; ESP by official result source)	16 March 2025	Barcelona Marathon	Barcelona, Spain	
Marathon	2:18:42	Ousman Jaiteh	8 December 2019		Reggio Emilia, Italy	
Marathon	2:18:40	Muhammad Lamin Bah (Note: citizenship unclear; ESP by official result source)	16 March 2025	Barcelona Marathon	Barcelona, Spain	
110 m hurdles	14.70 (−1.6 m/s)	Menseh Elliot	30 June 2012	African Championships	Porto-Novo, Benin	
400 m hurdles	55.43	Lamin Sanneh	16 May 2015		Dakar, Senegal	
400 m hurdles	54.26	Habib Jallow	13 May 2017	NSIC Conference Championship	Saint Paul, United States	
3000 m steeplechase	9:25.03	Nfamara Njie	24 September 2017	Ravenna Italian Club Championships	Ravenna, Italy	
High jump	2.18 m	Sheikh Tidiane Faye	November 1974		Banjul, The Gambia	
Pole vault	5.40 m	Lamin Krubally	19 September 2020		Zweibrücken, Germany	
Pole vault	5.50 m	Lamin Krubally	18 August 2019	CAS International Meeting	Schifflange, Luxembourg	
Long jump	7.95 m	Babou Saine	26 April 1991		Springfield, United States	
Triple jump	15.05 m	Jim Malleh Wadda	July 1978		Banjul, the Gambia	
Shot put	12.62 m	Ismaila Kah	31 July 1993		Banjul, the Gambia	
Discus throw	36.94 m	Dodou Jatta	4 April 1970		Dakar, Senegal	
Hammer throw						
Javelin throw	49.60 m	Ismaila Kah	26 June 1993		Banjul, The Gambia	
Javelin throw	50.26 m	Abdourahman Gumaneh	7 September 2019	Campionati Nazionali AICS	Cervia, Italy	
Decathlon						
Decathlon	100m / Long jump / Shot put / High jump / 400m / 110m H / Discus / Pole vault / Javelin / 1500m					
20 km walk (road)						
50 km walk (road)						
4 × 100 m relay	39.24	The Gambia; Sencan Jobe; Ali̇eu Joof; Ebrahima Camara; Adama Jammeh	20 March 2024	African Games	Accra, Ghana	
4 × 400 m relay	3:13.21	The Gambia; K.M. Lamine; M. Ismaila; J. Bakary; Ebrima Ceesay	21 July 2007	All-Africa Games	Algiers, Algeria	

=== Women ===
Event	Record	Athlete	Date	Meet	Place	Ref.
100 m	10.93 (+0.5 m/s)	Gina Bass	18 May 2024	Meeting de la Martinique	Fort-de-France, France	
200 m	22.58 (+1.8 m/s)	Gina Bass	30 August 2019	African Games	Rabat, Morocco	
400 m	51.10	Sanu Jallow-Lockhart	11 April 2026	44 Farms Team Invitational	College Station, United States	
800 m	1:56.85	Sanu Jallow-Lockhart	13 June 2026	NCAA Division I Championships	Eugene, United States	
1500 m	4:45.3 h	Sokhna Saho	12 May 2017	West Africa Championship	Conakry, Guinea	
1500 m	4:28.26	Sanu Jallow-Lockhart	12 April 2025	Arkansas Spring Invitational	Fayetteville, United States	
3000 m	10:39.20	Mam Touray	11 June 2016		Banjul, The Gambia	
5000 m						
10,000 m						
10 km (road)	37:25	Mariama T Jallow	26 May 2013	Great Manchester Run	Manchester, United Kingdom	
Half marathon	1:22:08	Mariama T Jallow	12 May 2013	Sheffield Half Marathon	Sheffield, United Kingdom	
Marathon	2:45:00	Mariama Jallow	18 September 2016	Kassel Marathon	Kassel, Germany	
100 m hurdles	14.70 (−1.4 m/s)	Nusrat Ceesay	12 June 2013		Huelva, Spain	
400 m hurdles	57.24	Nusrat Ceesay	20 April 2012	Azusa Pacific Bryan Clay Invitational	Azusa, United States	
3000 m steeplechase						
High jump	1.65 m	Mama Gassama	11 May 2001		Bakau, The Gambia	
High jump	1.65 m	Mama Gassama	12 October 2003	All-Africa Games	Abuja, Nigeria	
High jump	1.65 m	Mama Gassama	10 July 2004		Dakar, Senegal	
Pole vault	1.50 m	Hadja Fanta Sidibeh Jambo	19 April 2009		Castellar del Vallès, Spain	
Long jump	5.73 m	Fatou Tiyana	29 June 2007		Bakau, The Gambia	
Long jump	5.91 m	Rohey Singhateh	6 May 2018	MIAA Outdoor Championships	Kearney, United States	
Triple jump	11.02 m	Nusrat Ceesay	4 August 2013		Kingston upon Thames, United Kingdom	
Triple jump	12.05 m	Rohey Singhateh	5 May 2019	MIAA Outdoor Championships	Warrensburg, Missouri	
Shot put	10.72 m	Mariama Conteh	13 May 2017	West Africa Championships	Conakry, Guinea	
Discus throw	21.24 m	Fatou Ceesay	13 April 1968		Dakar, Senegal	
Hammer throw						
Javelin throw	25.52 m	Jankey Sowe Dem	5 May 2013		Barcelona, Spain	
Heptathlon						
Heptathlon	100m H / High jump / Shot put / 200m / Long jump / Javelin / 800m					
20 km walk (road)						
50 km walk (road)						
4 × 100 m relay	43.83	The Gambia; Ola Buwaro; Wurrie Njadoe; Maimuna Jallou; Gina Bass	12 August 2022	Islamic Solidarity Games	Konya, Turkey	
4 × 400 m relay	3:52.8	The Gambia	14 May 2017		Conakry, Guinea	

== Indoor ==
=== Men ===
Event	Record	Athlete	Date	Meet	Place	Ref.
50 m	5.89	Mustapha Manga	21 December 2019	Parmameeting di Natale open	Parma, Italy	
60 m	6.63	Ebrahima Camara	13 February 2024	Belgrade Indoor Meeting	Belgrade, Serbia	
200 m	21.30	Momodou Sey	30 January 2022		Boston, United States	
400 m	46.62	Dawda Jallow	28 February 1991		Gainesville, United States	
800 m	1:51.92	Omar Jammeh	21 January 2018	Baden-Württemberg Championships	Mannheim, Germany	
1500 m	4:06.32	Nfamara Njie	31 January 2015		Bari, Italy	
3000 m						
60 m hurdles						
High jump						
Pole vault	5.30 m	Lamin Krubally	23 February 2020	German Championships	Leipzig, Germany	
Pole vault	5.30 m (Note: not recognized by World Athletics)	Lamin Krubally	31 January 2020	VIACTIVE RaceArt Meeting	Bochum, Germany	
Long jump	7.81 m	Sheikh Tidiane Faye	5 February 1977		Bloomington, United States	
Triple jump	14.91 m	Jim Wadda	25 January 1980		Cosford, United Kingdom	
Shot put						
Heptathlon						
Heptathlon	60m / Long jump / Shot put / High jump / 60m H / Pole vault / 1000m					
5000 m walk						
4 × 400 m relay						

=== Women ===
Event	Record	Athlete	Date	Meet	Place	Ref.
60 m	7.11	Gina Bass	19 February 2020	Meeting Hauts de France Pas de Calais	Liévin, France	
200 m	28.25	Hadja Sidibeh Jambo	11 January 2009		Vilafranca, Spain	
400 m	52.06	Sanu Jallow-Lockhart	7 February 2026	Wooo Pig Classic	Fayetteville, United States	
600 m	1:24.19	Sanu Jallow-Lockhart	16 January 2026	Arkansas Invitational	Fayetteville, United States	
800 m	1:59.76	Sanu Jallow-Lockhart	14 February 2026	Tyson Invitational	Fayetteville, United States	
1500 m						
Mile	4:40.21	Sanu Jallow-Lockhart	7 February 2026	Wooo Pig Classic	Fayetteville, United States	
3000 m						
60 m hurdles	11.16	Hadja Sidibeh Jambo	17 January 2009		Vilafranca, Spain	
High jump	1.41 m	Hawa Sawaneh	8 February 2015		Val-de-Reuil, France	
Pole vault						
Long jump	5.05 m	Jankey Sowe	30 January 2010		Vilafranca, Spain	
Long jump	5.70 m	Rohey Singhateh	6 February 2016	UNK Indoor Invitational	Kearney, United States	
Triple jump	12.13 m	Rohey Singhateh	24 February 2019	MIAA Indoor Championship	Maryville, United States	
Shot put						
Pentathlon						
Pentathlon	60m H / High jump / Shot put / Long jump / 800m					
3000 m walk						
4 × 400 m relay						
