= Pa Mamadou Gai =

Gambian sprinter

Medal record

Men's athletics

Representing Gambia

African Championships
Bronze medal – third place	1996 Yaoundé	Long jump

Pa Mamadou Gai (born 10 October 1977) is a former Gambian sprinter who competed in the men's 100m competition at the 1996 Summer Olympics. He recorded a 10.72, not enough to qualify for the next round past the heats. His personal best is 10.72, set during that race. In 1996 he was also a part of the Gambian 4 × 100 m team, which finished 7th in its heat with a score of 41.80. He also competed in the 100m at the 2000 Summer Olympics, recording an 11.03
