= Ebrahima Camara =

Gambian sprinter

Personal information
- Nationality: Gambian
- Born: 18 September 1996 (age 29)

Sport
- Sport: Athletics
- Event: Sprinting

Ebrahima Camara (born 18 September 1996) is a Gambian athlete. He competed in the men's 100 metres event at the 2019 World Athletics Championships.

He competed in the men's 100 metres event at the 2020 Summer Olympics.

He is currently the Gambian national record holder in the 100m sprint with a best of 9.98. He is also the first Gambian sprinter to go under 10 seconds.

Olympic Games
Preceded by Gina Bass	Flag bearer for Gambia; Tokyo 2020 with Gina Bass	Succeeded by Gina Mariam Bass Bittaye; Faye Njie
