= Faye Njie =

Finnish–Gambian judoka

Personal information
- Nationality: Finnish, Gambian
- Born: 23 November 1993 (age 32) Helsinki, Finland
- Occupation: Judoka

Sport
- Country: The Gambia
- Sport: Judo
- Weight class: ‍–‍73 kg

Achievements and titles
- Olympic Games: R32 (2020, 2024)
- World Champ.: R32 (2017, 2021, 2023, 2025, 2026)
- African Champ.: (silver) (2017, 2021)
- Commonwealth Games: (silver) (2022)
Medal record
Men's judo
Representing Gambia
African Games
Silver medal – second place	2015 Brazzaville	‍–‍73 kg
African Championships
Silver medal – second place	2017 Antananarivo	‍–‍73 kg
Silver medal – second place	2021 Dakar	‍–‍73 kg
Bronze medal – third place	2019 Cape Town	‍–‍73 kg
Bronze medal – third place	2023 Casablanca	‍–‍73 kg
Bronze medal – third place	2024 Cairo	‍–‍73 kg
Commonwealth Games
Silver medal – second place	2022 Birmingham	‍–‍73 kg
Bronze medal – third place	2026 Glasgow	‍–‍73 kg

Profile at external databases
- IJF: 27553
- JudoInside.com: 54772
- Updated on 6 October 2026

Faye Njie (born 23 November 1993) is a Finnish-born Gambian judoka. He was born in Helsinki, Finland to a Finnish mother and a Gambian father, and has represented both countries.

He represented Finland in the 2009 European Cadet Championships, the 2009 EYOF, the 2011, and the 2012 European Junior Championships before switching to fight for the Gambia.

Njie was the first-ever Olympic judoka for the Gambia. He competed at the 2016 Summer Olympics in Rio de Janeiro, in the men's 73 kg, where he was eliminated by Didar Khamza in the first round.

He competed in the men's 73 kg event at the 2020 Summer Olympics.

He competed in the men's 73 kg event at the 2022 Commonwealth Games, winning the country's first-ever silver medal in the Games. Njie was also a silver medalist at the 2015 African Games.

Njie was the flag bearer for the Gambia at the 2024 Summer Olympics Parade of Nations. He competed for the Gambia at the 2024 Summer Olympics in the men's 73 kg event.

Olympic Games
Preceded by Gina Mariam Bass Bittaye; Ebrima Camara	Flagbearer for Gambia; Paris 2024 with Gina Mariam Bass Bittaye	Succeeded by Incumbent
