= Gina Mariam Bass Bittaye =

Gambian sprinter (born 1995)

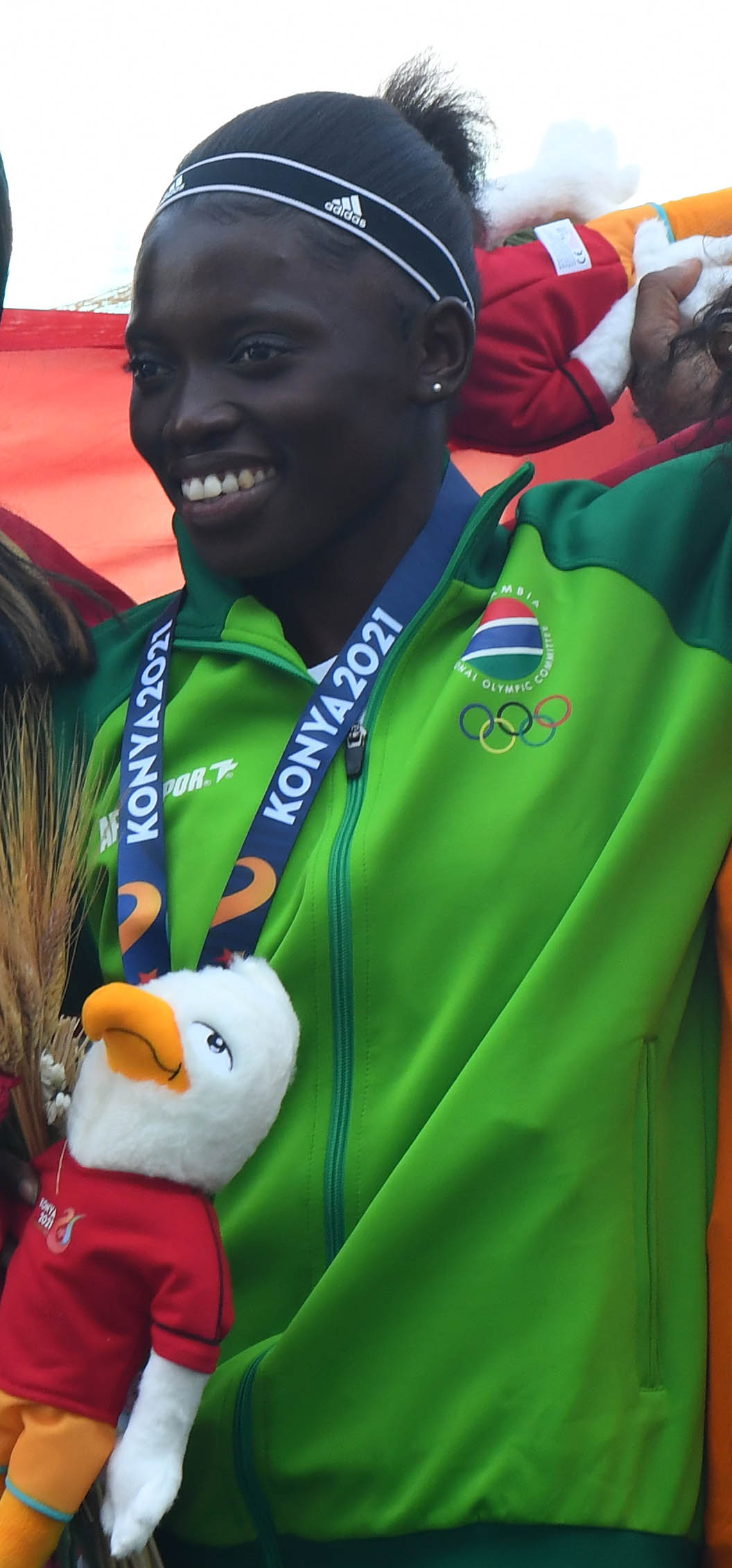
- Bass in 2022

Personal information
- Born: 3 May 1995 (age 31) Tubakuta, Gambia

Sport
- Sport: Athletics
- Events: 100 m, 200 m

Achievements and titles
- Personal bests: 100m, 10.93 2024, Fort-de-France 200m 22.58 2019, Rabat
Medal record
Women's athletics
Representing Gambia
African Games
Gold medal – first place	2019 Rabat	200 m
Gold medal – first place	2023 Accra	100 m
Gold medal – first place	2023 Accra	200 m
Silver medal – second place	2019 Rabat	100 m
African Championships
Gold medal – first place	2022 Saint Pierre	100 m
Gold medal – first place	2024 Douala	100 m
Bronze medal – third place	2016 Durban	200 m
Bronze medal – third place	2022 Saint Pierre	4×100 m relay

Gina Mariam Bass Bittaye, commonly known as Gina Bass (born 3 May 1995) is a Gambian athlete competing in sprinting events.

== Early life and career ==
Gina Bass was born in May 1995 in Tubakuta in the West Coast Division. Her talent was sported very early when she used to participate in schools athletic competition.

She won the bronze medal in the 200 metres at the 2016 African Championships. Bass qualified for the 2016 Summer Olympics and was the Gambian flag bearer.

At the 2016 Summer Olympics, she placed 52nd in the 200 metres heats and did not qualify for the semi-finals.

She is the first-ever Gambian to qualify for the final at the World Athletics Championships.

She currently holds national records in the 100 and 200 metres.

She qualified to represent Gambia at the 2020 Summer Olympics in the women's 100 metre and 200 metre events. In the 100 metres race, she set a new national record of 11.12 seconds.

== International competitions ==
Year	Competition	Venue	Position	Event	Notes
Representing the Gambia
2011	World Youth Championships	Lille, France	38th (h)	100 m	12.44
2015	African Games	Brazzaville, Republic of the Congo	13th (sf)	100 m	11.97
2015	African Games	Brazzaville, Republic of the Congo	13th (sf)	200 m	24.13
2016	African Championships	Durban, South Africa	10th (sf)	100 m	11.63
2016	African Championships	Durban, South Africa	3rd	200 m	22.92
2016	Olympic Games	Rio de Janeiro, Brazil	52nd (h)	200 m	23.43
2017	Islamic Solidarity Games	Baku, Azerbaijan	1st	100 m	11.56
2017	Islamic Solidarity Games	Baku, Azerbaijan	2nd	200 m	23.15
2017	World Championships	London, United Kingdom	31st (h)	200 m	23.56
2018	Commonwealth Games	Gold Coast, Australia	14th (sf)	100 m	11.64
2018	Commonwealth Games	Gold Coast, Australia	13th (sf)	200 m	23.60
2018	African Championships	Asaba, Nigeria	8th	100 m	11.85
2018	African Championships	Asaba, Nigeria	4th	200 m	23.40
2019	African Games	Rabat, Morocco	2nd	100 m	11.13
2019	African Games	Rabat, Morocco	1st	200 m	22.58
2019	World Championships	Doha, Qatar	15th (sf)	100 m	11.24
2019	World Championships	Doha, Qatar	6th	200 m	22.71
2020	Olympic Games	Tokyo, Japan	15th (sf)	100 m	11.16
2020	Olympic Games	Tokyo, Japan	14th (sf)	200 m	22.67
2022	World Indoor Championships	Belgrade, Serbia	23rd (sf)	60 m	7.31
2022	African Championships	Port Louis, Mauritius	1st	100 m	11.06
2022	African Championships	Port Louis, Mauritius	3rd	4 × 100 m relay	44.97
2022	World Championships	Eugene, United States	14th (sf)	200 m	22.71
2022	Islamic Solidarity Games	Konya, Turkey	1st	200 m	22.63 (w)
2022	Islamic Solidarity Games	Konya, Turkey	1st	4 × 100 m relay	43.83
2023	World Championships	Budapest, Hungary	18th (sf)	100 m	11.19
2023	World Championships	Budapest, Hungary	21st (sf)	200 m	23.10
2024	World Indoor Championships	Glasgow, United Kingdom	18th (sf)	60 m	7.21
2024	African Games	Accra, Ghana	1st	100 m	11.36
2024	African Games	Accra, Ghana	1st	200 m	23.13
2024	African Championships	Douala, Cameroon	1st	100 m	11.14
2024	African Championships	Douala, Cameroon	9th (h)	4 × 100 m relay	55.21
2024	Olympic Games	Paris, France	13th (sf)	100 m	11.10
2024	Olympic Games	Paris, France	14th (sf)	200 m	22.66
2026	Commonwealth Games	Glasgow, United Kingdom	12th (sf)	100 m	11.29
2026	Commonwealth Games	Glasgow, United Kingdom	8th	4 × 100 m relay	44.85

== Personal bests ==
Outdoor

- 100 metres – 10.93 (+0.5 m/s, Port-de-France 2024) NR
- 200 metres – 22.58 (+1.8 m/s, Rabat 2019) NR

Olympic Games
Preceded by Suwaibou Sanneh	Flagbearer for Gambia; Rio de Janeiro 2016 Tokyo 2020 with Ebrima Camara; Paris 2024 with Faye Njie	Succeeded by Incumbent
