= Dawda Jallow =

Gambian sprinter

Personal information
- Nationality: Gambian
- Born: 22 December 1966 (age 59)

Sport
- Sport: Sprinting
- Event: 400 metres

Dawda Jallow (born 22 December 1966) is a Gambian sprinter. He competed in the 400 metres at the 1984, 1988 and the 1996 Summer Olympics.

Jallow competed for the Georgia Bulldogs track and field team in the NCAA.

Olympic Games
Preceded by Oumar Fye	Flagbearer for Gambia; Seoul 1988; Barcelona 1992; Atlanta 1996	Succeeded by Adama N'Jie
