= The Gambia National Olympic Committee =

National Olympic Committee

- Country/Region: The Gambia
- Code: GAM
- Created: 1972
- Recognized: 1976
- Continental Association: ANOCA
- Headquarters: Bakau, Gambia
- President: Alhaji Dodou J. Joof
- Secretary General: Abdoulie Mb Jallow
- Website: gambianoc.gm

The Gambia National Olympic Committee (IOC code: GAM) is the National Olympic Committee representing the Gambia. It is also the body responsible for the Gambia's representation at the Olympic Games.

The Gambia National Olympic Committee is also The Gambia's Commonwealth Games Association as well.

== History ==
The Gambia National Olympic Committee was founded in 1972 and recognised by the International Olympic Committee in 1976.

== See also ==
- The Gambia at the Commonwealth Games
- The Gambia at the Olympics
