= Flag of the Gambia =

Republic of The Gambia
- Use: National flag and ensign
- Proportion: 2:3
- Adopted: 18 February 1965; 61 years ago
- Design: A horizontal tricolour of red, blue and green; each band of colour is separated by a narrow band of white
- Designed by: Pa Louis Thomasi
- Standard of the President
- Design: A blue flag with the national coat of arms charged in the center.

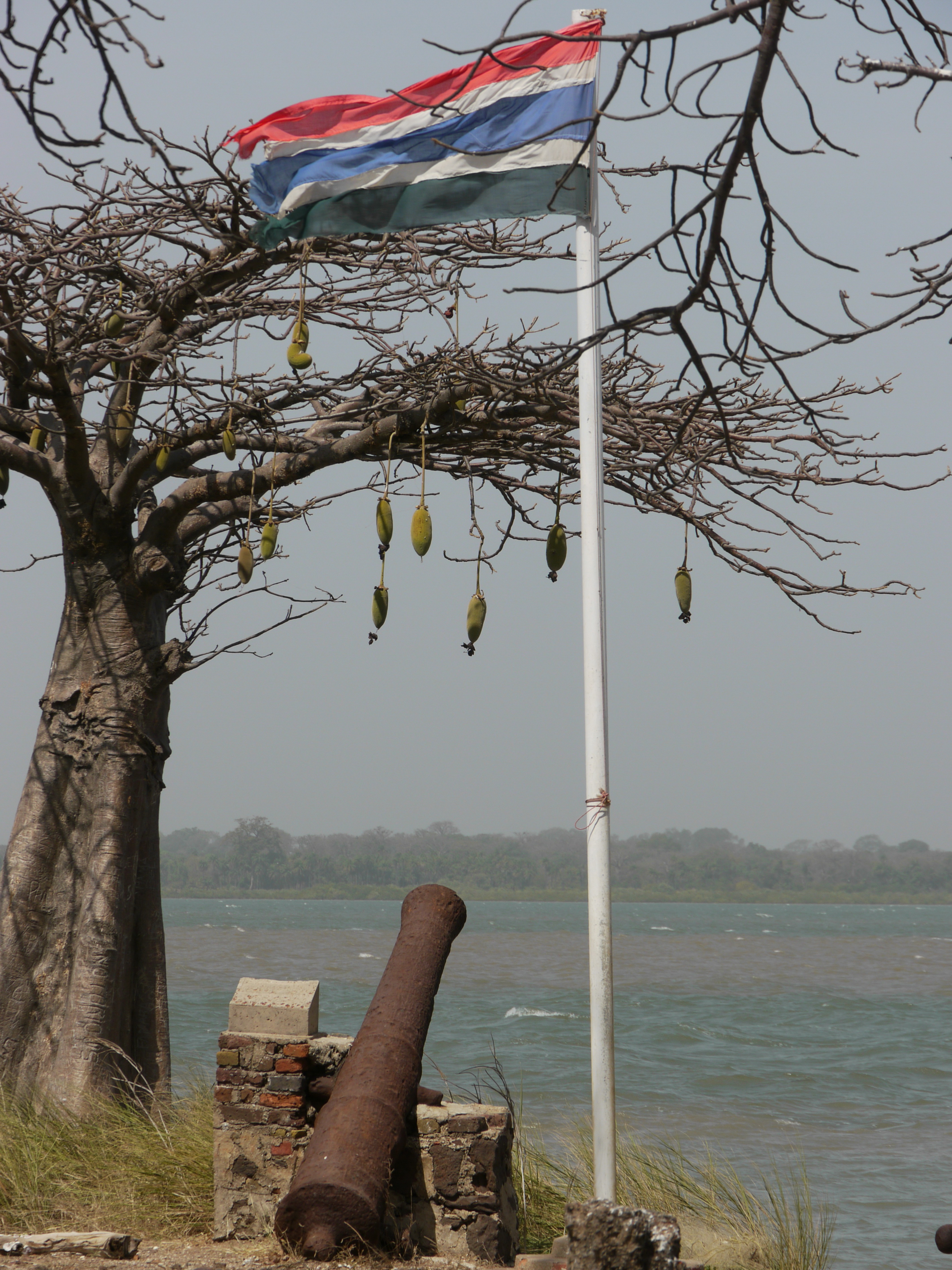
Gambian flag on Kunta Kinteh Island

The national flag of The Gambia consists of three horizontal red, blue and green bands separated by two thin white stripes. Adopted in 1965 to replace the British Blue Ensign defaced with the arms of the Gambia Colony and Protectorate, it has been the flag of the Republic of the Gambia since the country gained independence that year. It remained unchanged throughout the Gambia's seven-year confederation with Senegal.

== History ==
The British first arrived in what is now modern-day Gambia in 1661, when they conquered James Island. They built forts around the confluence of the Gambia River with the Atlantic Ocean, and gradually expanded their control upstream. This area became a protectorate in the 1820s under the jurisdiction of Sierra Leone, and eventually emerged as a separate crown colony of the United Kingdom within its colonial empire in 1888. This newfound status gave the Gambia its own "distinctive" colonial flag. This is because colonies were permitted to utilize the British Blue Ensign and deface it with the arms of the territory under the Colonial Naval Defence Act 1865. The arms of the Gambia at the time consisted of a circle depicting an elephant, a palm tree and hills, along with the letter "G" standing for the first letter of the territory's name.

The Gambia was granted self-governance in 1963. The defaced blue ensign continued to be used until full independence was granted in 1965. The winning design for the new flag was created by Louis Thomasi, who worked as an accountant. It is one of the few African flags that does not utilize the colours of the country's leading political party, since its design "has no political basis". It was first hoisted at midnight on February 18, 1965, the day the Gambia became an independent country. In 1982, the Gambia formed a confederation with Senegal, which lasted for seven years before its dissolution in 1989. However, this closer union did not result in change of national symbols, and the Gambian flag continued to be flown during this time.

== Design ==
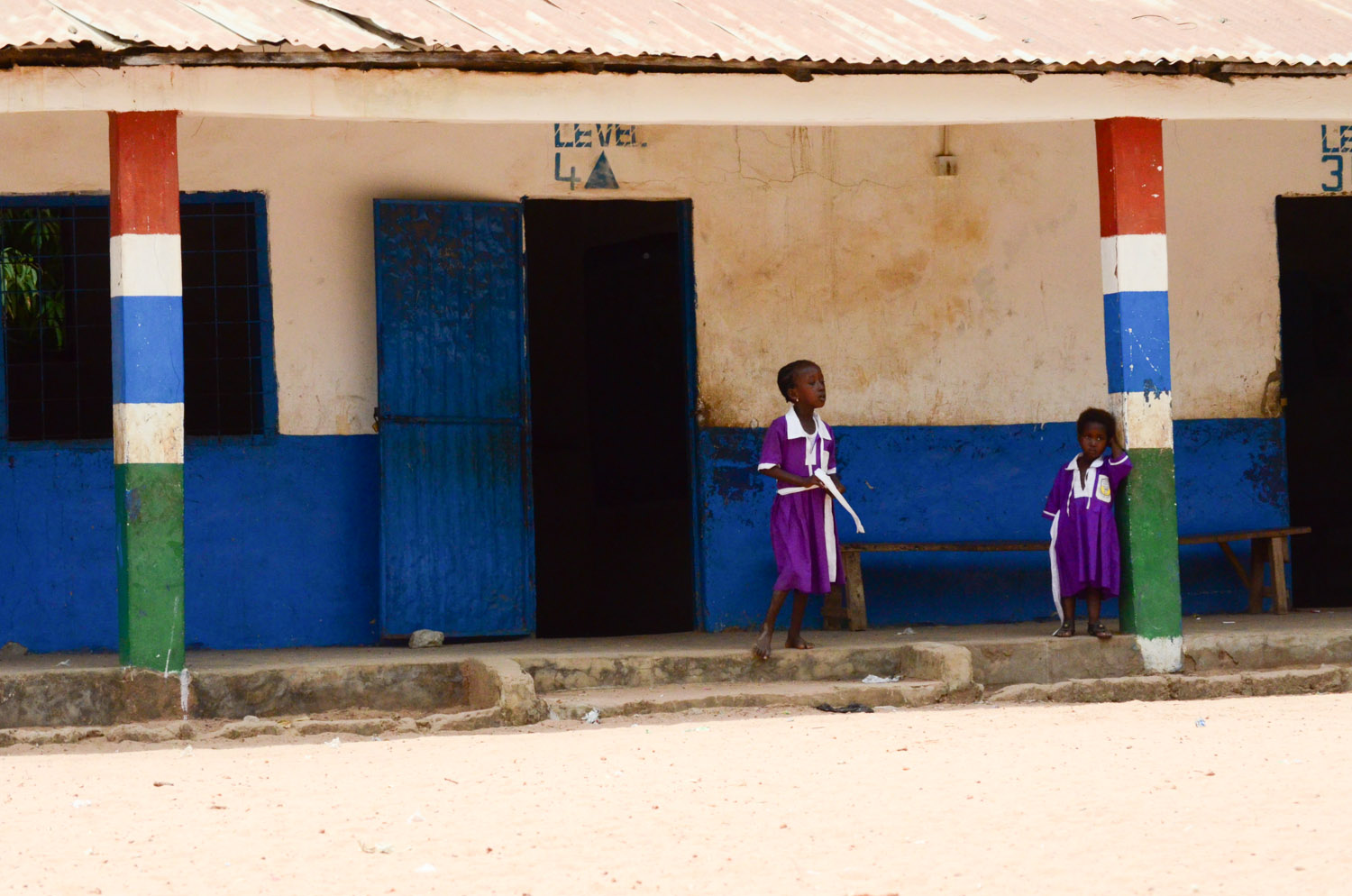
Pillars painted with the Gambian flag colors

=== Symbolism ===
The colours of the flag carry cultural, political, and regional meanings. The blue alludes to the Gambia River, which is the nation's key geographical feature and from which the country derives its name. The red evokes the sun – given the Gambia's close proximity to the Equator – as well as the savanna, while the thin white stripes represent "unity and peace". The green symbolizes the forest and the agricultural goods that the Gambian people are heavily dependent on, both for exports and their personal use.

=== Similarities ===
The flag's colour scheme of red, blue, green and white is the same as the one featured on the coat of arms of the Gambia.

=== Construction sheet ===
flag construction sheet

== Governmental flags ==
Flag	Date	Use	Description
		Standard of the President	A blue flag with the national coat of arms charged in the centre.
		Standard of Gambian Ambassadors	The national flag with the coat of arms of the Gambia in the centre.

== Other uses ==
Following the 2013 general election in Luxembourg, a three-party coalition between the Luxembourg Socialist Workers' Party (LSAP), the Democratic Party (DP) and The Greens was formed. It was labelled a "Gambia coalition", because the colours of the three political parties are identical to the ones on the flag of the Gambia – red (LSAP), blue (DP) and Green (The Greens).

== Military flags and ensigns ==
Military flags and ensigns of the Gambia are following British practice but different from British military flags and ensigns.

== See also ==
- Coat of arms of the Gambia
- List of Gambian flags
- Flags of Africa
