= 2023 London Athletics Meet =

- Dates: 23 July 2023
- Host city: London
- Venue: London Stadium
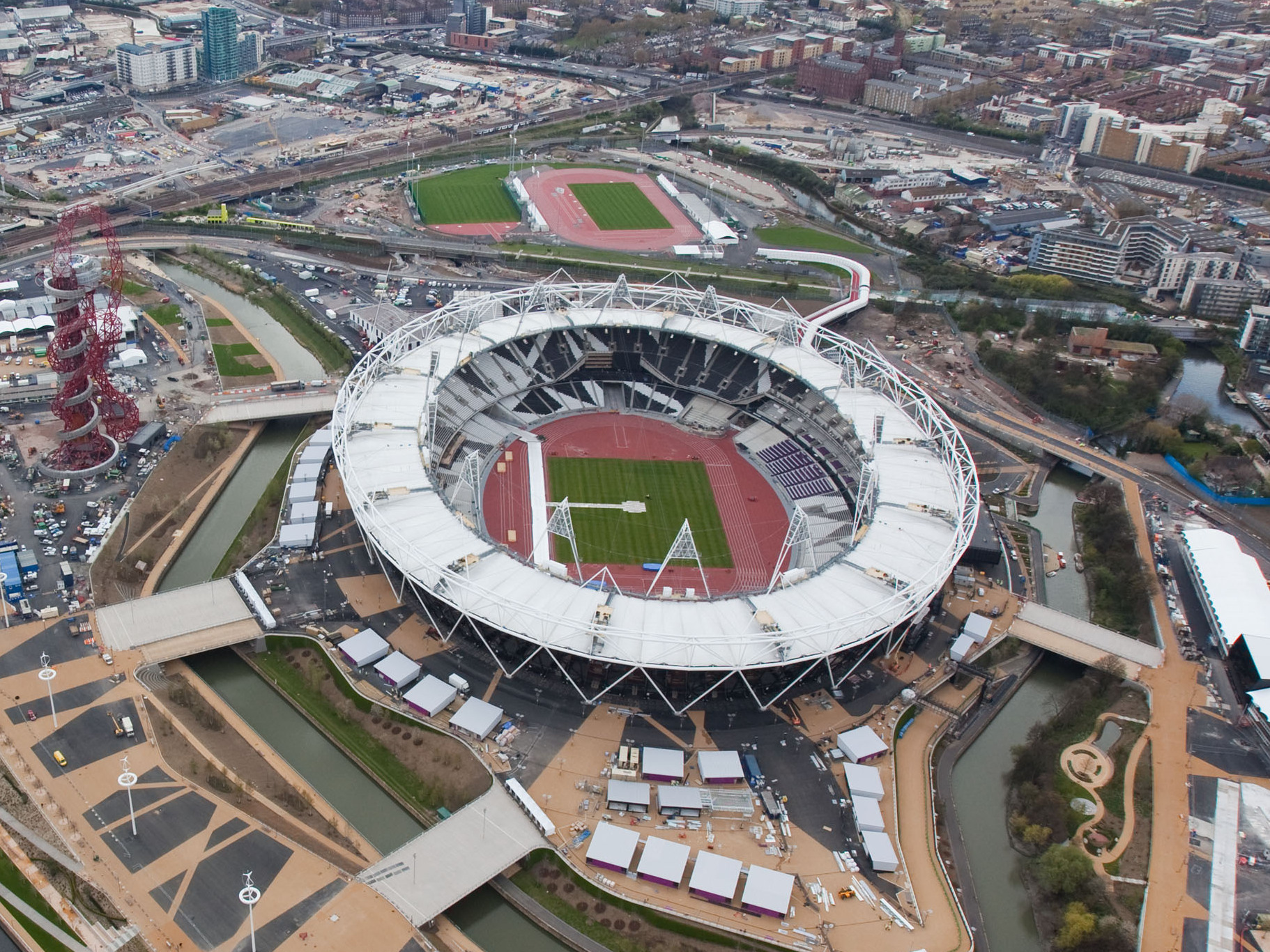
- Level: 2023 Diamond League

The 2023 London Athletics Meet, also known as London Diamond League, was the 70th edition of the annual outdoor track and field meeting held in London. Held on 23 July at London Stadium, it was the tenth leg of the 2023 Diamond League – the highest level international track and field circuit.

The meeting was highlighted by Gudaf Tsegay beating Sifan Hassan over 5000 metres, with Alicia Monson setting the American record in tow. Over 50,000 people were in attendance, among the highest of any athletics meeting in 2023.

== Results ==
Athletes competing in the Diamond League disciplines earned extra compensation and points which went towards qualifying for the 2023 Diamond League finals. First place earned 8 points, with each step down in place earning one less point than the previous, until no points are awarded in 9th place or lower.

=== Diamond Discipline ===
Men's 200m (+1.6 m/s)
Place	Athlete	Country	Time	Points
1st place, gold medalist(s)	Noah Lyles	United States	19.47	8
2nd place, silver medalist(s)	Letsile Tebogo	Botswana	19.50	7
3rd place, bronze medalist(s)	Zharnel Hughes	Great Britain	19.73	6
4	Kyree King	United States	20.01	5
5	Alexander Ogando	Dominican Republic	20.14	4
6	Emmanuel Matadi	Liberia	20.35	3
7	Joe Ferguson	Great Britain	20.44	2
8	Jona Efoloko	Great Britain	20.56	1

Men's 400m
Place	Athlete	Country	Time	Points
1st place, gold medalist(s)	Wayde van Niekerk	South Africa	44.36	8
2nd place, silver medalist(s)	Bryce Deadmon	United States	44.40	7
3rd place, bronze medalist(s)	Vernon Norwood	United States	44.46	6
4	Matthew Hudson-Smith	Great Britain	44.72	5
5	Leungo Scotch	Botswana	44.98	4
6	Ryan Willie	United States	45.39	3
7	Liemarvin Bonevacia	Netherlands	45.51	2
8	Alex Haydock-Wilson	Great Britain	45.59	1

Men's 1500m
Place	Athlete	Country	Time	Points
1st place, gold medalist(s)	Yared Nuguse	United States	3:30.44	8
2nd place, silver medalist(s)	Narve Gilje Nordås	Norway	3:30.58	7
3rd place, bronze medalist(s)	Neil Gourley	Great Britain	3:30.60	6
4	Elliot Giles	Great Britain	3:30.92	5
5	Matthew Stonier	Great Britain	3:31.30	4
6	Stewart McSweyn	Australia	3:31.42	3
7	Adel Mechaal	Spain	3:31.43	2
8	Timothy Cheruiyot	Kenya	3:31.44	1
9	Azeddine Habz	France	3:31.58	
10	Sam Tanner	New Zealand	3:31.60	
11	Mario García	Spain	3:31.68	
12	Adam Spencer	Australia	3:31.81	
13	Cole Hocker	United States	3:32.14	
14	Andrew Coscoran	Ireland	3:32.42	
15	George Mills	Great Britain	3:35.76	
	Erik Sowinski	United States	DNF	

Men's 110mH (+1.3 m/s)
Place	Athlete	Country	Time	Points
1st place, gold medalist(s)	Grant Holloway	United States	13.01	8
2nd place, silver medalist(s)	Shunsuke Izumiya	Japan	13.06	7
3rd place, bronze medalist(s)	Jamal Britt	United States	13.25	6
4	Hansle Parchment	Jamaica	13.26	5
5	Tade Ojora	Great Britain	13.27	4
6	Joshua Zeller	Great Britain	13.82	3
7	Freddie Crittenden	United States	14.83	2

Men's High Jump
Place	Athlete	Country	Mark	Points
1st place, gold medalist(s)	JuVaughn Harrison	United States	2.35 m	8
2nd place, silver medalist(s)	Mutaz Barsham	Qatar	2.33 m	7
3rd place, bronze medalist(s)	Thomas Carmoy	Belgium	2.27 m	6
4	Joel Clarke-Khan	Great Britain	2.27 m	5
5	Andriy Protsenko	Ukraine	2.24 m	4
6	Hamish Kerr	New Zealand	2.24 m	3
7	Tobias Potye	Germany	2.20 m	2
8	Donald Thomas	Bahamas	2.20 m	1
9	Joel Baden	Australia	2.16 m	

Men's Shot Put
Place	Athlete	Country	Mark	Points
1st place, gold medalist(s)	Ryan Crouser	United States	23.07 m	8
2nd place, silver medalist(s)	Tom Walsh	New Zealand	22.58 m	7
3rd place, bronze medalist(s)	Joe Kovacs	United States	21.87 m	6
4	Payton Otterdahl	United States	21.74 m	5
5	Jacko Gill	New Zealand	21.11 m	4
6	Filip Mihaljević	Croatia	21.06 m	3
7	Tomáš Staněk	Czech Republic	21.04 m	2
8	Leonardo Fabbri	Italy	20.97 m	1
9	Scott Lincoln	Great Britain	20.48 m	
	Josh Awotunde	United States	NM	

Men's Discus Throw
Place	Athlete	Country	Mark	Points
1st place, gold medalist(s)	Daniel Ståhl	Sweden	67.03 m	8
2nd place, silver medalist(s)	Matthew Denny	Australia	66.77 m	7
3rd place, bronze medalist(s)	Kristjan Čeh	Slovenia	66.02 m	6
4	Alex Rose	Samoa	65.56 m	5
5	Andrius Gudžius	Lithuania	65.47 m	4
6	Lawrence Okoye	Great Britain	62.59 m	3
7	Sam Mattis	United States	61.83 m	2
8	Simon Pettersson	Sweden	61.48 m	1

Women's 100m (+1.2 m/s)
Place	Athlete	Country	Time	Points
1st place, gold medalist(s)	Marie-Josée Ta Lou	Ivory Coast	10.75	8
2nd place, silver medalist(s)	Dina Asher-Smith	Great Britain	10.85	7
3rd place, bronze medalist(s)	Shericka Jackson	Jamaica	10.94	6
4	Daryll Neita	Great Britain	10.96	5
5	Aleia Hobbs	United States	10.99	4
6	Twanisha Terry	United States	10.99	3
7	Melissa Jefferson	United States	11.09	2
8	Anthonique Strachan	Bahamas	11.13	1

Women's 800m
Place	Athlete	Country	Time	Points
1st place, gold medalist(s)	Jemma Reekie	Great Britain	1:57.30	8
2nd place, silver medalist(s)	Natoya Goule	Jamaica	1:57.61	7
3rd place, bronze medalist(s)	Halimah Nakaayi	Uganda	1:57.62	6
4	Catriona Bisset	Australia	1:57.78	5
5	Katie Snowden	Great Britain	1:58.00	4
6	Rénelle Lamote	France	1:58.64	3
7	Raevyn Rogers	United States	1:58.98	2
8	Sage Hurta	United States	2:03.98	1
	Anita Horvat	Slovenia	DNF	
	Aneta Lemiesz	Poland	DNF	
	Diribe Welteji	Ethiopia	DNF	

Women's 5000m
Place	Athlete	Country	Time	Points
1st place, gold medalist(s)	Gudaf Tsegay	Ethiopia	14:12.29	8
2nd place, silver medalist(s)	Beatrice Chebet	Kenya	14:12.92	7
3rd place, bronze medalist(s)	Sifan Hassan	Netherlands	14:13.42	6
4	Medina Eisa	Ethiopia	14:16.54	5
5	Alicia Monson	United States	14:19.45	4
6	Birke Haylom	Ethiopia	14:37.94	3
7	Melknat Wudu	Ethiopia	14:39.36	2
8	Nadia Battocletti	Italy	14:41.30	1
9	Karoline Bjerkeli Grøvdal	Norway	14:45.24	
10	Senayet Getachew	Ethiopia	14:46.25	
11	Elly Henes	United States	14:47.15	
12	Maureen Koster	Netherlands	14:47.52	
13	Teresia Muthoni Gateri	Kenya	14:53.62	
14	Girmawit Gebrzihair	Ethiopia	14:54.01	
15	Megan Keith	Great Britain	14:56.98	
16	Josette Andrews	United States	15:04.39	
17	Jessica Warner-Judd	Great Britain	15:06.21	
	Margaret Akidor	Kenya	DNF	
	Mizan Alem	Ethiopia	DNF	
	Rose Davies	Australia	DNF	

Women's 400mH
Place	Athlete	Country	Time	Points
1st place, gold medalist(s)	Femke Bol	Netherlands	51.45	8
2nd place, silver medalist(s)	Janieve Russell	Jamaica	53.75	7
3rd place, bronze medalist(s)	Shamier Little	United States	53.76	6
4	Rushell Clayton	Jamaica	53.97	5
5	Jessie Knight	Great Britain	54.09	4
6	Viktoriya Tkachuk	Ukraine	54.25	3
7	Anna Ryzhykova	Ukraine	54.53	2
8	Gianna Woodruff	Panama	55.52	1

Women's 3000mSC
Place	Athlete	Country	Time	Points
1st place, gold medalist(s)	Jackline Chepkoech	Kenya	8:57.35	8
2nd place, silver medalist(s)	Beatrice Chepkoech	Kenya	9:04.34	7
3rd place, bronze medalist(s)	Aimee Pratt	Great Britain	9:16.10	6
4	Courtney Wayment	United States	9:17.21	5
5	Flavie Renouard	France	9:19.07	4
6	Krissy Gear	United States	9:25.49	3
7	Alicja Konieczek	Poland	9:30.19	2
8	Juliane Hvid	Denmark	9:33.40	1
9	Irene Sánchez-Escribano	Spain	9:33.64	
10	Michelle Finn	Ireland	9:34.76	
11	Elizabeth Bird	Great Britain	9:59.12	
12	Poppy Tank	Great Britain	10:05.59	
	Fancy Cherono	Kenya	DNF	

Women's Pole Vault
Place	Athlete	Country	Mark	Points
1st place, gold medalist(s)	Wilma Murto	Finland	4.80 m	8
2nd place, silver medalist(s)	Katie Moon	United States	4.80 m	7
3rd place, bronze medalist(s)	Tina Šutej	Slovenia	4.71 m	6
4	Nina Kennedy	Australia	4.71 m	5
5	Katerina Stefanidi	Greece	4.62 m	4
6	Sandi Morris	United States	4.51 m	3
7	Roberta Bruni	Italy	4.51 m	2
8	Molly Caudery	Great Britain	4.51 m	1
9	Alysha Newman	Canada	4.36 m	
	Holly Bradshaw	Great Britain	NM	

Women's Long Jump
Place	Athlete	Country	Mark	Points
1st place, gold medalist(s)	Quanesha Burks	United States	6.98 m (+0.6 m/s)	8
2nd place, silver medalist(s)	Brooke Buschkuehl	Australia	6.72 m (NWI)	7
3rd place, bronze medalist(s)	Tara Davis-Woodhall	United States	6.72 m (NWI)	6
4	Jazmin Sawyers	Great Britain	6.67 m (−1.6 m/s)	5
5	Katarina Johnson-Thompson	Great Britain	6.60 m (+1.2 m/s)	4
6	Maryna Bekh-Romanchuk	Ukraine	6.52 m (−0.6 m/s)	3
7	Ivana Španović	Serbia	6.51 m (−1.8 m/s)	2
8	Leticia Oro Melo	Brazil	6.28 m (−1.0 m/s)	1

=== Promotional events ===
Men's 800m
Place	Athlete	Country	Time
1st place, gold medalist(s)	Max Burgin	Great Britain	1:43.85
2nd place, silver medalist(s)	Ben Pattison	Great Britain	1:44.02
3rd place, bronze medalist(s)	Alex Botterill	Great Britain	1:44.75
4	Guy Learmonth	Great Britain	1:44.80
5	Thomas Randolph	Great Britain	1:44.88
6	Ethan Hussey	Great Britain	1:44.96
7	Archie Davis	Great Britain	1:45.39
8	Reece Sharman-Newell	Great Britain	1:45.49
9	Samuel Reardon	Great Britain	1:48.50
10	Yusuf Bizimana	Great Britain	1:49.37
	Erik Sowinski	United States	DNF

Men's 4 × 100 m
Place	Athlete	Country	Time
1st place, gold medalist(s)	Ryuichiro Sakai; Hiroki Yanagita; Yuki Koike; Koki Ueyama	Japan	37.80
2nd place, silver medalist(s)	Jeremiah Azu; Zharnel Hughes; Jona Efoloko; Tommy Ramdhan	Great Britain	38.00
3rd place, bronze medalist(s)	Adam Gemili; Oliver Bromby; Richard Kilty; Joe Ferguson	Great Britain	38.14
4	Kevin Kranz; Lucas Ansah-Peprah; Joshua Hartmann; Yannik Wolf	Germany	38.21
5	Pascal Mancini; Timothé Mumenthaler; Bradley Lestrade; Silvan Wicki	Switzerland	38.53
6	Lachlan Kennedy; Jacob Despard; Christopher Ius; Jake Penny	Australia	38.62
7	Simon Hansen; Tazana Kamanga-Dyrbak; Tobias Larsen; Kojo Musah	Denmark	39.16
	Hensley Paulina; Taymir Burnet; Nsikak Ekpo; Raphael Bouju	Netherlands	DNF

Women's 4 × 100 m
Place	Athlete	Country	Time
1st place, gold medalist(s)	N'Ketia Seedo; Marije van Hunenstijn; Jamile Samuel; Tasa Jiya	Netherlands	42.38
2nd place, silver medalist(s)	Melissa Jefferson; Twanisha Terry; Dezerea Bryant; Aleia Hobbs	United States	42.47
3rd place, bronze medalist(s)	Annie Tagoe; Imani-Lara Lansiquot; Bianca Williams; Kristal Awuah	Great Britain	42.59
4	Cassie-Ann Pemberton; Amy Hunt; Alyson Bell; Aleeya Sibbons	Great Britain	42.92
5	Ebony Lane; Bree Masters; Kristie Edwards; Ella Connolly	Australia	43.46
6	Alizee Morency Poilvache; Janie de Naeyer; Rani Vincke; Elise Mehuys	Belgium	43.90
	Jennifer Montag; Sina Mayer; Gina Lückenkemper; Rebekka Haase	Germany	DNF

=== U20 events ===
Men's 4 × 100 m
Place	Athlete	Country	Time
1st place, gold medalist(s)		Great Britain	41.52
2nd place, silver medalist(s)		Great Britain	41.93
3rd place, bronze medalist(s)		Great Britain	42.06

Women's 4 × 100 m
Place	Athlete	Country	Time
1st place, gold medalist(s)		Great Britain	45.90
2nd place, silver medalist(s)		Great Britain	46.24
3rd place, bronze medalist(s)		Great Britain	48.00
4		Great Britain	48.40

=== U18 events ===
Men's 4 × 100 m
Place	Athlete	Country	Time
1st place, gold medalist(s)		Great Britain	41.20
2nd place, silver medalist(s)		Great Britain	41.23
3rd place, bronze medalist(s)		Great Britain	42.23

Women's 4 × 100 m
Place	Athlete	Country	Time
1st place, gold medalist(s)		Great Britain	47.48
2nd place, silver medalist(s)		Great Britain	47.57
3rd place, bronze medalist(s)		Great Britain	47.61
4		Great Britain	47.81

== See also ==
- 2023 Diamond League
