= 2023 Birmingham Indoor Grand Prix =

Athletics meeting in Birmingham, England

- Dates: 25 February 2023
- Host city: Birmingham, United Kingdom
- Venue: Arena Birmingham
- Level: 2023 World Athletics Indoor Tour

The 2023 Birmingham Indoor Grand Prix was the 18th edition of the annual indoor athletics meeting in Birmingham, United Kingdom. Held on 25 February, it was the final leg of the 2023 World Athletics Indoor Tour Gold series – the highest-level international indoor track and field athletics circuit.

Meeting records were set in the men's 60 m hurdles and women's 800 m and 3000 m. Neil Gourley and Keely Hodgkinson both set British indoor records at 1500 m and 800 m respectively.

== Results ==
=== World Athletics Indoor Tour ===
Men's 400m
Place	Athlete	Country	Time	Points
1st place, gold medalist(s)	Jereem Richards	Trinidad and Tobago	45.74	10
2nd place, silver medalist(s)	Vernon Norwood	United States	45.92	7
3rd place, bronze medalist(s)	Jack Raftery	Ireland	46.66	5
4	Ben Higgins	Great Britain	46.66	3
5	Gustav Lundholm Nielsen	Denmark	46.87	
6	Samuel Reardon	Great Britain	47.02	

Men's 1500m
Place	Athlete	Country	Time	Points
1st place, gold medalist(s)	Neil Gourley	Great Britain	3:32.48	10
2nd place, silver medalist(s)	Adel Mechaal	Spain	3:33.28	7
3rd place, bronze medalist(s)	Andrew Coscoran	Ireland	3:33.49	5
4	Luke McCann	Ireland	3:34.76	3
5	Josh Kerr	Great Britain	3:34.93	
6	Ossama Meslek	Italy	3:37.50	
7	Nick Griggs	Ireland	3:39.94	
8	Piers Copeland	Great Britain	3:40.64	
	Erik Sowinski	United States	DNF	

Men's 60mH
Place	Athlete	Country	Time	Points
1st place, gold medalist(s)	Grant Holloway	United States	7.35	10
2nd place, silver medalist(s)	Daniel Roberts	United States	7.47	7
3rd place, bronze medalist(s)	Roger Iribarne	Cuba	7.58	5
4	Michael Dickson	United States	7.60	3
5	Freddie Crittenden	United States	7.61	
6	David King	Great Britain	7.70	
7	Damian Czykier	Poland	7.80	
8	Andrew Pozzi	Great Britain	7.80	

Men's High Jump
Place	Athlete	Country	Mark	Points
1st place, gold medalist(s)	Hamish Kerr	New Zealand	2.28 m	10
2nd place, silver medalist(s)	Erik Portillo	Mexico	2.28 m	7
3rd place, bronze medalist(s)	Edgar Rivera	Mexico	2.25 m	5
4	Tobias Potye	Germany	2.25 m	3
5	Marco Fassinotti	Italy	2.22 m	
6	Norbert Kobielski	Poland	2.22 m	
7	Thomas Carmoy	Belgium	2.18 m	
8	William Grimsey	Great Britain	2.14 m	

Men's Long Jump
Place	Athlete	Country	Mark	Points
1st place, gold medalist(s)	Marquis Dendy	United States	8.28 m	10
2nd place, silver medalist(s)	Tajay Gayle	Jamaica	8.13 m	7
3rd place, bronze medalist(s)	William Williams	United States	8.03 m	5
4	Erwan Konaté	France	7.82 m	3
5	Reynold Banigo	Great Britain	7.81 m	
6	Thobias Montler	Sweden	7.63 m	
7	Jack Roach	Great Britain	7.60 m	
8	Marko Čeko	Croatia	7.41 m	

Women's 60m
Place	Athlete	Country	Time	Points
1st place, gold medalist(s)	Dina Asher-Smith	Great Britain	7.05	10
2nd place, silver medalist(s)	Daryll Neita	Great Britain	7.13	7
3rd place, bronze medalist(s)	Destiny Smith-Barnett	United States	7.15	5
4	Shericka Jackson	Jamaica	7.18	3
5	Natasha Morrison	Jamaica	7.24	
6	Anthonique Strachan	Bahamas	7.25	
7	Gina Lückenkemper	Germany	7.28	
8	Asha Philip	Great Britain	7.30	

Women's 60m Round 1
Place	Athlete	Country	Time	Heat
1	Dina Asher-Smith	Great Britain	7.03	2
2	Daryll Neita	Great Britain	7.14	1
3	Destiny Smith-Barnett	United States	7.19	2
4	Shericka Jackson	Jamaica	7.23	1
5	Anthonique Strachan	Bahamas	7.27	1
6	Gina Lückenkemper	Germany	7.27	2
7	Asha Philip	Great Britain	7.28	2
8	Natasha Morrison	Jamaica	7.29	2
9	Olivia Fotopoulou	Cyprus	7.36	1
10	Arialis Gandulla	Portugal	7.37	1
11	Bianca Williams	Great Britain	7.37	2
12	Alisha Rees	Great Britain	7.41	2
13	Gloria Hooper	Italy	7.44	2
14	Diani Walker	Great Britain	7.47	1
15	Cassie-Ann Pemberton	Great Britain	7.47	1

Women's 800m
Place	Athlete	Country	Time	Points
1st place, gold medalist(s)	Keely Hodgkinson	Great Britain	1:57.18	10
2nd place, silver medalist(s)	Catriona Bisset	Australia	1:59.83	7
3rd place, bronze medalist(s)	Isabelle Boffey	Great Britain	2:00.25	5
4	Anita Horvat	Slovenia	2:00.62	3
5	Ellie Baker	Great Britain	2:00.86	
6	Allie Wilson	United States	2:01.13	
7	Noélie Yarigo	Benin	2:01.18	
	Aneta Lemiesz	Poland	DNF	

Women's 3000m
Place	Athlete	Country	Time	Points
1st place, gold medalist(s)	Gudaf Tsegay	Ethiopia	8:16.69	10
2nd place, silver medalist(s)	Mizan Alem	Ethiopia	8:31.20	7
3rd place, bronze medalist(s)	Konstanze Klosterhalfen	Germany	8:35.14	5
4	Teresia Muthoni Gateri	Kenya	8:36.64	3
5	Margaret Akidor	Kenya	8:40.24	
6	Martyna Galant	Poland	8:43.08	
7	Alice Finot	France	8:44.47	
8	Klara Lukan	Slovenia	8:44.80	
9	Marta Pen	Portugal	8:47.07	
10	Eloise Walker	Great Britain	9:02.80	
	Birke Haylom	Ethiopia	DNF	
	Nadia Power	Ireland	DNF	

Women's Pole Vault
Place	Athlete	Country	Mark	Points
1st place, gold medalist(s)	Alysha Newman	Canada	4.78 m	10
2nd place, silver medalist(s)	Tina Šutej	Slovenia	4.71 m	7
3rd place, bronze medalist(s)	Gabriela Leon	United States	4.61 m	5
4	Roberta Bruni	Italy	4.61 m	3
5	Katerina Stefanidi	Greece	4.51 m	
6	Bridget Williams	United States	4.51 m	
7	Wilma Murto	Finland	4.51 m	
8	Sophie Cook	Great Britain	4.41 m	
	Jade Ive	Great Britain	NM	

=== Indoor Meeting ===
Men's 60m
Place	Athlete	Country	Time
1st place, gold medalist(s)	Charlie Dobson	Great Britain	6.64
2nd place, silver medalist(s)	Adam Gemili	Great Britain	6.68
3rd place, bronze medalist(s)	Sam Gordon	Great Britain	6.70
4	Adam Thomas	Great Britain	6.70
5	Jona Efoloko	Great Britain	6.71
	Jeremiah Azu	Great Britain	DQ
	Ojie Edoburun	Great Britain	DQ
	Richard Akinyebo	Great Britain	DQ

Women's 1000m
Place	Athlete	Country	Time
1st place, gold medalist(s)	Laura Muir	Great Britain	2:34.53
2nd place, silver medalist(s)	Claudia Bobocea	Romania	2:35.35
3rd place, bronze medalist(s)	Sofia Ennaoui	Poland	2:35.69
4	Elena Bellò	Italy	2:37.09
5	Katie Snowden	Great Britain	2:37.46
6	Maureen Koster	Netherlands	2:37.85
7	Kristie Schoffield	United States	2:39.31
8	Petja Klojčnik	Slovenia	2:40.43
	Jenny Selman	Great Britain	DNF
