= Athletics at the 2024 Summer Olympics – Women's 5000 metres =

Women's 5000 metres at the Games of the XXXIII Olympiad
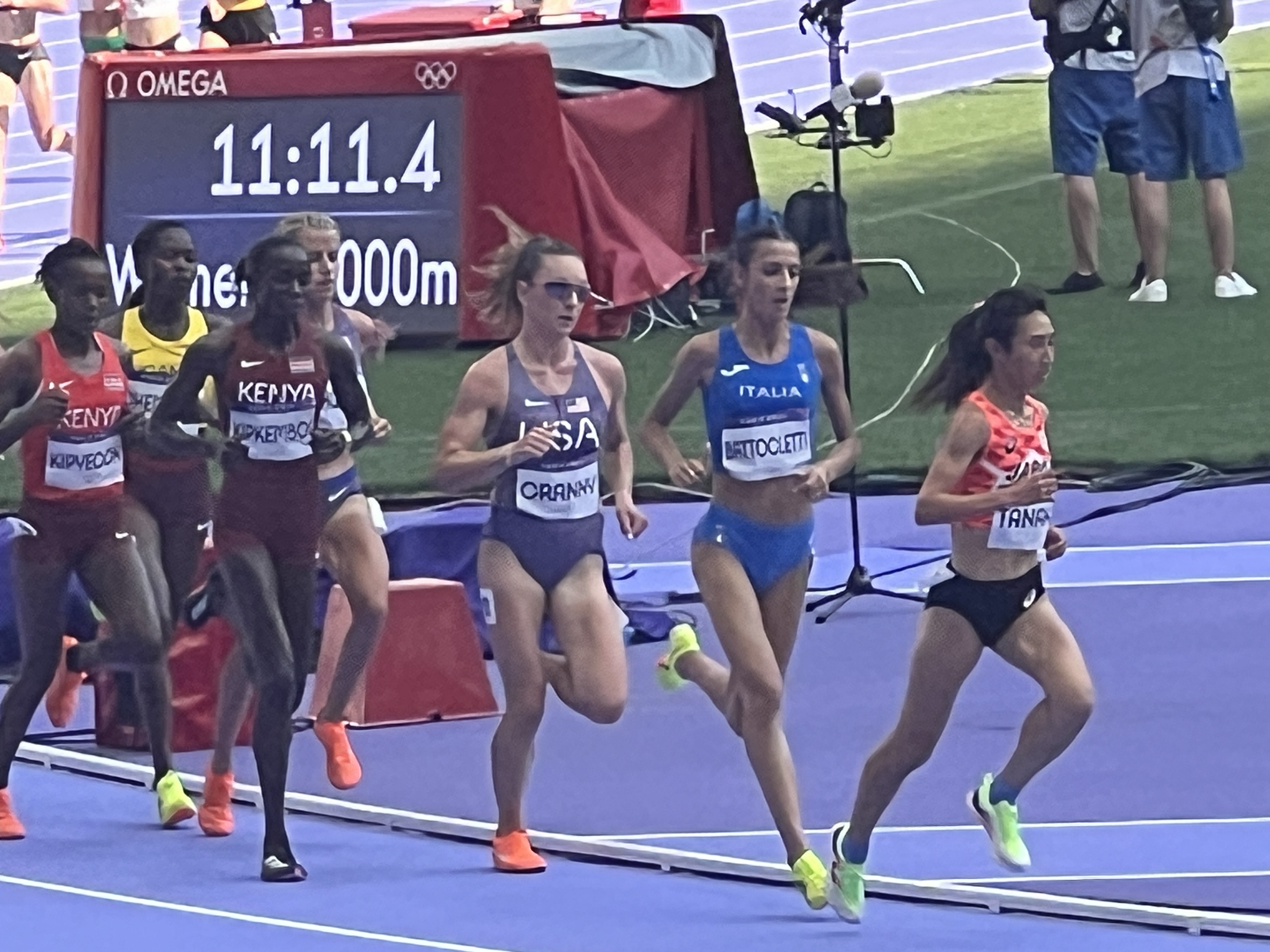
- Heat 1 of the women's 5000 meters at the Paris 2024 Summer Olympic Games.
- Venue: Stade de France, Paris, France
- Dates: 2 August 2024 (round 1); 5 August 2024 (final)
- Competitors: 41 from 25 nations
- Winning time: 14:28.56

Medalists
1st place, gold medalist(s)		Beatrice Chebet	Kenya
2nd place, silver medalist(s)		Faith Kipyegon	Kenya
3rd place, bronze medalist(s)		Sifan Hassan	Netherlands

The women's 5000 metres at the 2024 Summer Olympics was held in two rounds at the Stade de France in Paris, France, on 2 and 5 August 2024. This was the eighth time that the women's 5000 metres is contested at the Summer Olympics. A total of 43 athletes were to qualify for the event by entry standard or ranking.

== Summary ==
2020 Olympic champion, Sifan Hassan returned to defend her title. Gudaf Tsegay, bronze medallist in 2020, and 2022 World Champion, also returned. 2023 World Champion, and 1500 m world record holder Faith Kipyegon was also viewed as a favourite for the medals, with two-time cross-country champion Beatrice Chebet, European champion Nadia Battocletti, and African Games champion Medina Eisa also billed as strong contenders.

At the gun in the final, Kipyegon led from the front and controlled the pace. Karoline Bjerkeli Grøvdal later moved to the front, with Battocletti dropped in behind her. At the 300 m stage, Ejgayehu Taye moved to the front, followed by her Ethiopian teammate Tsegay. Kipyegon then moved back to the front, increasing the pace. With just under three laps to go, Tsegay moved to the front to challenge Kipyegon, with the two exchanging elbows. As the pace quickened, Hassan moved from the back of the leading pack to third. At the bell, the three Kenyans lead with Kipyegon followed closely by Chebet and Margaret Kipkemboi. In the final straight, Chebet outkicked Kipyegon to win in 14:28.56. Kipyegon took silver in 14:29.60 with Hassan securing bronze in 14:30.61.

Kipyegon was originally disqualified after the race for an earlier race incident with Tsegay. Battocletti had finished fourth and was advanced to the bronze behind Hassan. However, after a protest, Kipyegon was reinstated as the silver medallist and the original results were restored.

== Background ==
The women's 5000 metres has been present on the Olympic athletics programme since 1996, when the event replaced the women's 3000 metres to match the men's event.

Global records before the 2024 Summer Olympics
Record	Athlete (nation)	Time (s)	Location	Date
World record	Gudaf Tsegay (ETH)	14:00.21	Eugene, United States	17 September 2023
Olympic record	Vivian Cheruiyot (KEN)	14:26.72	Rio de Janeiro, Brazil	19 August 2016
World leading	Tsigie Gebreselama (ETH)	14:18.76	Eugene, United States	25 May 2024

Area records before the 2024 Summer Olympics
Area record	Athlete (nation)	Time (s)
Africa (records)	Gudaf Tsegay (ETH)	14:00.21 WR
Asia (records)	Bo Jiang (CHN)	14:28.09
Europe (records)	Sifan Hassan (NED)	14:13.42
North, Central America and Caribbean (records)	Alicia Monson (USA)	14:19.45
Oceania (records)	Kimberley Smith (AUS)	14:39.89
South America (records)	Joselyn Brea (VEN)	14:36.59

== Qualification ==
For the women's 5000 metres event, the qualification period was between 1 July 2023 and 30 June 2024. 45 athletes were able to qualify for the event, with a maximum of three athletes per nation, by running the entry standard of 14:52.00 seconds or faster or by their World Athletics Ranking for this event.

== Results ==
=== Round 1 ===
Round 1 was held on 2 August, starting at 18:10 (UTC+2) in the evening. First 8 in each heat (Q) advance to the final.

==== Heat 1 ====
Rank	Athlete	Nation	Time	Notes
1	Faith Kipyegon	Kenya	14:57.56	Q
2	Sifan Hassan	Netherlands	14:57.65 (.641)	Q
3	Nadia Battocletti	Italy	14:57.65 (.647)	Q
4	Margaret Kipkemboi	Kenya	14:57.70	Q
5	Gudaf Tsegay	Ethiopia	14:57.84	Q, SB
6	Ejgayehu Taye	Ethiopia	14:57.97	Q
7	Elise Cranny	United States	14:58.55	Q
8	Karissa Schweizer	United States	14:59.64	Q
9	Nozomi Tanaka	Japan	15:00.62	
10	Marta García	Spain	15:08.87	
11	Mariana Machado	Portugal	15:23.26	
-	Belinda Chemutai	Uganda	15:23.90	DSQ
12	Lauren Ryan	Australia	15:29.35	
13	Hanna Klein	Germany	15:31.85	
14	Lisa Rooms	Belgium	15:37.55	
15	Agate Caune	Latvia	15:38.19	
16	Yuma Yamamoto	Japan	15:43.67	
17	Alma Delia Cortés	Mexico	15:45.33	
18	Briana Scott	Canada	15:47.30	
19	Ankita Dhyani	India	16:19.38	
	Joy Cheptoyek	Uganda	DNS	

==== Heat 2 ====
Rank	Athlete	Nation	Time	Notes
1	Beatrice Chebet	Kenya	15:00.73	Q
2	Medina Eisa	Ethiopia	15:00.82	Q
3	Rose Davies	Australia	15:00.86	Q
4	Karoline Bjerkeli Grøvdal	Norway	15:01.14	Q
5	Francine Niyomukunzi	Burundi	15:01.42	Q
6	Whittni Morgan	United States	15:02.14	Q, SB
7	Nathalie Blomqvist	Finland	15:02.75	Q
8	Joselyn Brea	Venezuela	15:02.89	Q
9	Isobel Batt-Doyle	Australia	15:03.64	
10	Maureen Koster	Netherlands	15:03.66	
11	Laura Galván	Mexico	15:05.20	SB
12	Klara Lukan	Slovenia	15:09.61	
13	Esther Chebet	Uganda	15:10.46	
14	Parul Chaudhary	India	15:10.68	SB
15	Samiyah Hassan Nour	Djibouti	15:13.63	
16	Federica Del Buono	Italy	15:15.54	
17	Sarah Madeleine	France	15:18.62	
18	Viktória Wagner-Gyürkés	Hungary	15:48.24	
19	Wakana Kabasawa	Japan	15:50.86	
20	Jodie McCann	Ireland	15:55.08	

=== Final ===
The final was held on 5 August, starting at 21:10 (UTC+2) in the evening.

Rank	Athlete	Nation	Time	Notes
1st place, gold medalist(s)	Beatrice Chebet	Kenya	14:28.56	
2nd place, silver medalist(s)	Faith Kipyegon	Kenya	14:29.60	SB
3rd place, bronze medalist(s)	Sifan Hassan	Netherlands	14:30.61	SB
4	Nadia Battocletti	Italy	14:31.64	NR
5	Margaret Kipkemboi	Kenya	14:32.23	SB
6	Ejgayehu Taye	Ethiopia	14:32.98	
7	Medina Eisa	Ethiopia	14:35.43	
8	Karoline Bjerkeli Grøvdal	Norway	14:43.21	
9	Gudaf Tsegay	Ethiopia	14:45.21	SB
10	Karissa Schweizer	United States	14:45.57	
11	Elise Cranny	United States	14:48.06	
12	Rose Davies	Australia	14:49.67	
13	Nathalie Blomqvist	Finland	14:53.10	
14	Whittni Morgan	United States	14:53.57	PB
15	Joselyn Brea	Venezuela	15:17.04	
16	Francine Niyomukunzi	Burundi	15:22.40	
