= Agate Caune =

Latvian middle - and long-distance runner (born 2004)

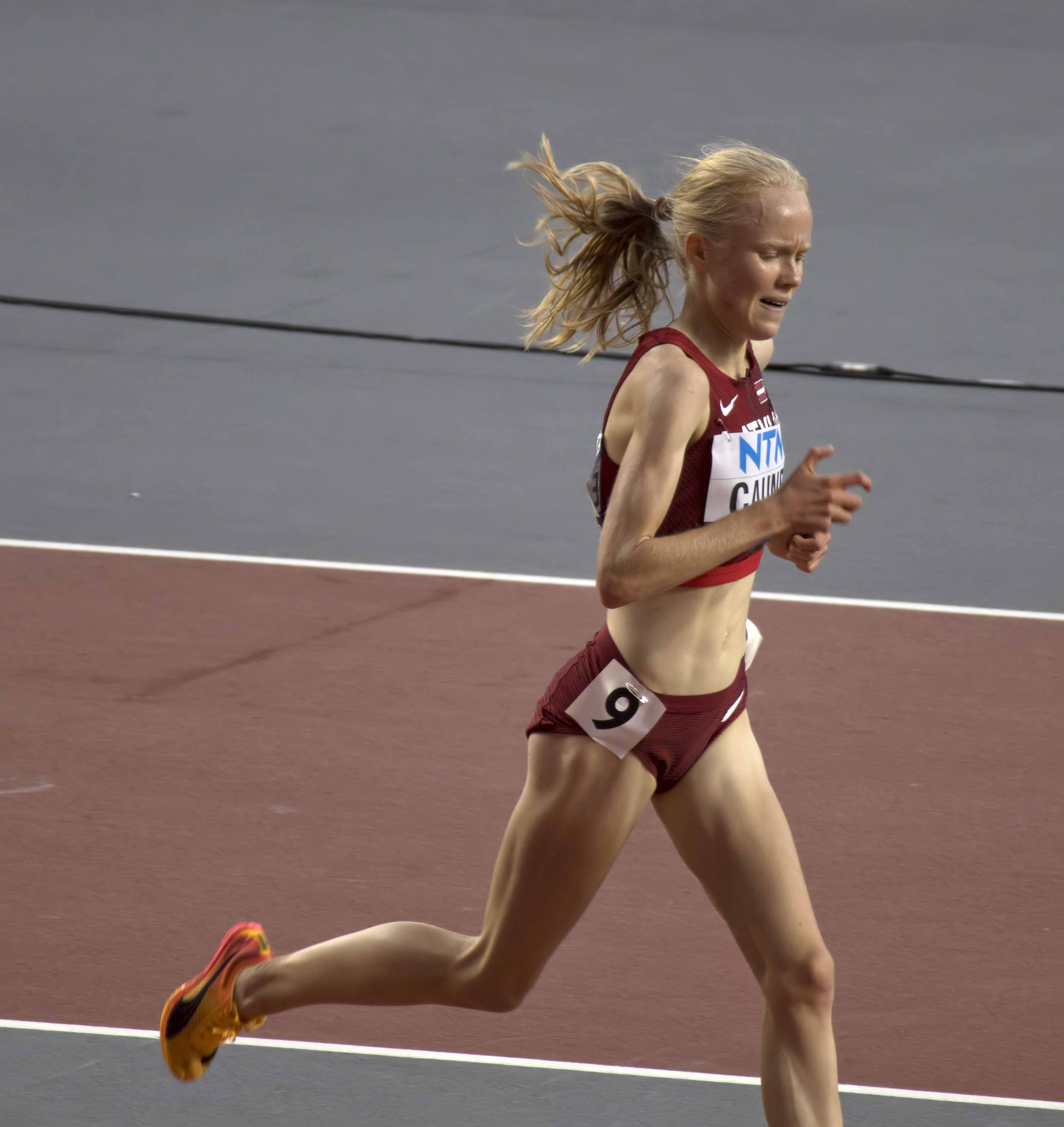
- Agate Caune in 2023

Personal information
- Nationality: Latvian
- Born: 7 August 2004 (age 22) Valmiera, Latvia

Sport
- Country: Latvia
- Sport: Athletics
- Events: 3000m, 5000m
- Club: Valmieras Sporta Skola
- Coached by: Līga Dzene; Raitis Ravinskis

Achievements and titles
- Personal bests: 3000 m: 8:39.78 (Chorzów 2023) NR NU20R; 5000 m: 15:00.48 (Budapest 2023); 10,000 m: 31:55.79 (Valmiera 2022) NU20R
Medal record
Women's athletics
Representing Latvia
World U20 Championships
Silver medal – second place	2022 Cali	5000 m
European Games
Gold medal – first place	2023 Kraków-Małopolska	5000 m
European U20 Championships
Gold medal – first place	2023 Jerusalem	3000 m
Gold medal – first place	2023 Jerusalem	5000 m
Silver medal – second place	2021 Tallinn	5000 m

Agate Caune (Latvian pronunciation: [ɑːgɑːtɛ t͡saʊnɛ] ah-GAH-teh tsown-eh; born 7 August 2004 in Valmiera, Latvia) is a Latvian former track and field athlete. A multiple national champion, she is also the Latvian national record holder over 3000 metres. She was named the Rising Star of the Year and the female U20 Track and Field Athlete of the Year in 2022.

She announced her retirement from the sport in November 2026.

== Biography ==
=== Early career ===
Caune started out in 2019 as the Latvian U16 champion in the 1500 metres and 3000 metres events. Gradually, she became the 2020 Latvian U18 champion in the indoor and outdoor 3000 metres. During the following 2021 Latvian U18 Championships, she won gold in the 800 metres and 1500 metres. Additionally, she gained her first national title in the 5000 metres the same year.

=== 2021 ===
From Valmiera, Caune won the silver medal in the 5000m at the 2021 European Athletics U20 Championships in Tallinn, whilst just 16 years-old. She then went to the 2021 World Athletics U20 Championships in Nairobi and finished fifth in the 3000m.

=== 2022 ===
She was the national champion in the 5000 metres for the second time, as well as the Latvian 10,000 metres champion in 2022. Throughout the year, she was declared the Latvian U20 champion for distances such as the: indoor 800 metres, indoor and outdoor 1500 metres, and outdoor 3000 metres.

Competing at the 2022 World U20 Championships, held in Cali, Colombia, she finished sixth in the 3000m final and ran 15:43.56 to win a silver medal in the 5000m (originally finished fourth behind Medina Eisa and Melknat Wudu, but Eisa and Wudu were later given a two-year ban for age falsification violations and stripped of their gold and silver medals). Caune ran 15:12.94 for the 5000m in Karlsruhe, Germany in May 2023.

=== 2023 ===
She remains the champion of the 2023 Latvian 10,000 metres. Currently, she has national titles in the outdoor 1500 metres and indoor 3000 metres. She received further awards at the 2023 Latvian U20 Championships when she won in categories like the indoor 800 metres and the indoor and outdoor 1500 metres.

At the 2023 European Indoor Championships held in Istanbul in March 2023, Caune qualified for the final, where she set a new Latvian U20 record for the 3000m, clocking 8:56.88 to finish in eleventh place.

In May 2023, Caune won a 5k event at the Riga Marathon, running it in 15:23 seconds, beating the previous Latvian record set by Jeļena Prokopčuka in 2009, by seven seconds. Caune then won a gold medal in the 5000 meters at the 2023 European Team Games running 15:15.21 in the Second Division race.

On 16 July 2023, in Silesia, Caune made her Diamond League debut and finished in seventh place in the 3000m, running 8:39.78 to break the Latvian national record.

In August 2023, Caune won gold medals in the 3000 metres and 5000 metres at the European U20 Championships in Jerusalem. She set a new championship record of 15:03.38 in the 5000 metres. Caune subsequently went on to the 2023 World Championships in Budapest. She used a bold strategy—heading straight to the front of the pack and not slowing down as the distance between her and her competitors increased—that helped her advance to the next round of the 5000 metres. However, prior to the final event, Caune withdrew due to a pelvic injury that had been present from the past few days. Upon the recommendation of her doctors, she elected to miss the race and not risk worsening her condition if she were to run.

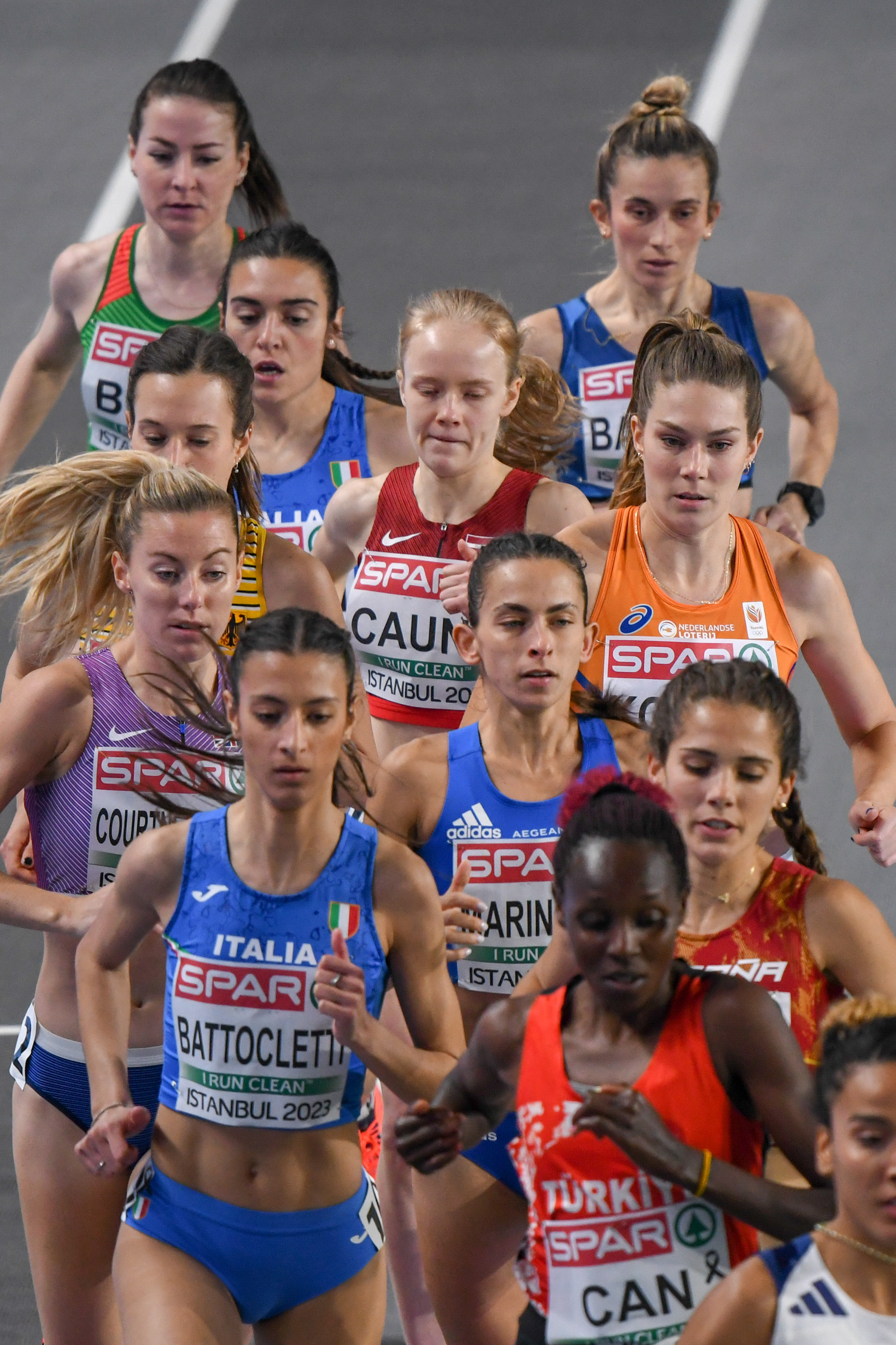
Caune (centre) at the 2023 European Indoor Championships

=== 2024 ===
She was selected to compete for Latvia at the 2024 Olympic 5000 meters in Paris. Caune finished sixteenth in her heat (and thirty-third overall) in a time of 15:38.19.

=== 2025 ===
Caune competed in the 3000 metres at the 2025 European Athletics Indoor Championships in Apeldoorn, Netherlands, finushing twelfth in her heat snd not making the final. In July 2025, Caune finished seventh in the 10,000 metres and ninth three days later in the 5000 metres at the European U23 Champio ships in Bergen, Norway.

=== 2026 ===
Caune won Apkārt Cēsīm over 5km race in 2026, with a new course record. That year, she placed first at the Rimi Riga Marathon 10km race. She represented Latvia at the European 10,000m Cup in May, and won the Latvian national 10,000 metres title in June.

== Achievements ==
Information from her World Athletics profile unless otherwise noted.

=== Personal bests ===
- 800 metres – 2:12.76 (Pärnu 2022)
  - 800 metres indoor – 2:10.24 (Valmiera 2023)
- 1500 metres – 4:14.79 (Valmiera 2023)
  - 1500 metres indoor – 4:17.01 (Valmiera 2023) NU20R
- 1000 metres indoor – 2:46.58 (Valmiera 2023) NU20R
- 2000 metres indoor – 5:55.29 (Valmiera 2023) AU20B
- 3000 metres – 8:39.78 (Chorzów 2023) NR NU20R
  - 3000 metres indoor – 8:56.88 (Istanbul 2023)
- 5000 metres – 15:00.48 (Budapest 2023)

=== International competitions ===
Year	Competition	Venue	Position	Event	Time	Notes
Representing Latvia
2021	European Team Championships Second League	Stara Zagora, Bulgaria	4th	3000 m	9:38.23	
2021	European U20 Championships	Tallinn, Estonia	8th	3000 m	9:21.52	PB SB
2021	European U20 Championships	Tallinn, Estonia	2nd	5000 m	16.17.56	EU18L
2021	World U20 Championships	Nairobi, Kenya	18th (h)	1500 m	4:37.49	
2021	World U20 Championships	Nairobi, Kenya	5th	3000 m	9:45.26	
2022	World U20 Championships	Cali, Colombia	6th	3000 m	9.25.92	
2022	World U20 Championships	Cali, Colombia	2nd	5000 m	15:43.56	PB SB
2023	European Indoor Championships	Istanbul, Turkey	11th	3000 m	9:01.33	EU20L
2023	European Team Championships Second Division	Chorzów, Poland	1st	5000 m	15:15.21	
2023	European U20 Championships	Jerusalem, Israel	1st	3000 m	8:53.20	
2023	European U20 Championships	Jerusalem, Israel	1st	5000 m	15:03.85	CR
2023	World Championships	Budapest, Hungary	12th (h)	5000 m	15:00.48	
2024	European Championships	Rome, Italy	16th	5000 m	15:28.04	
2024	Olympic Games	Paris, France	33rd (h)	5000 m	15:38.19	
2025	European Indoor Championships	Apeldoorn, Netherlands	22nd (h)	3000 m	9:22.00	
2025	European Running Championships	Leuven, Belgium	21st	10 km	32:38	
2025	European U23 Championships	Bergen, Norway	9th	5000 m	16:17.24	
2025	European U23 Championships	Bergen, Norway	7th	10,000 m	33:47.08	

=== National titles ===
- Latvian Championships (5)
  - 1500 metres: 2023
  - 5000 metres: 2021, 2022
  - 10000 metres: 2022, 2023
- Latvian Indoor Championships (2)
  - 3000 metres: 2022, 2023

== See also ==
- List of Latvian records in athletics
- List of Baltic records in athletics
- European Athletics U20 Championships
