= 2023 World Athletics Championships – Women's 5000 metres =

Women's 5000 metres at the 2023 World Championships
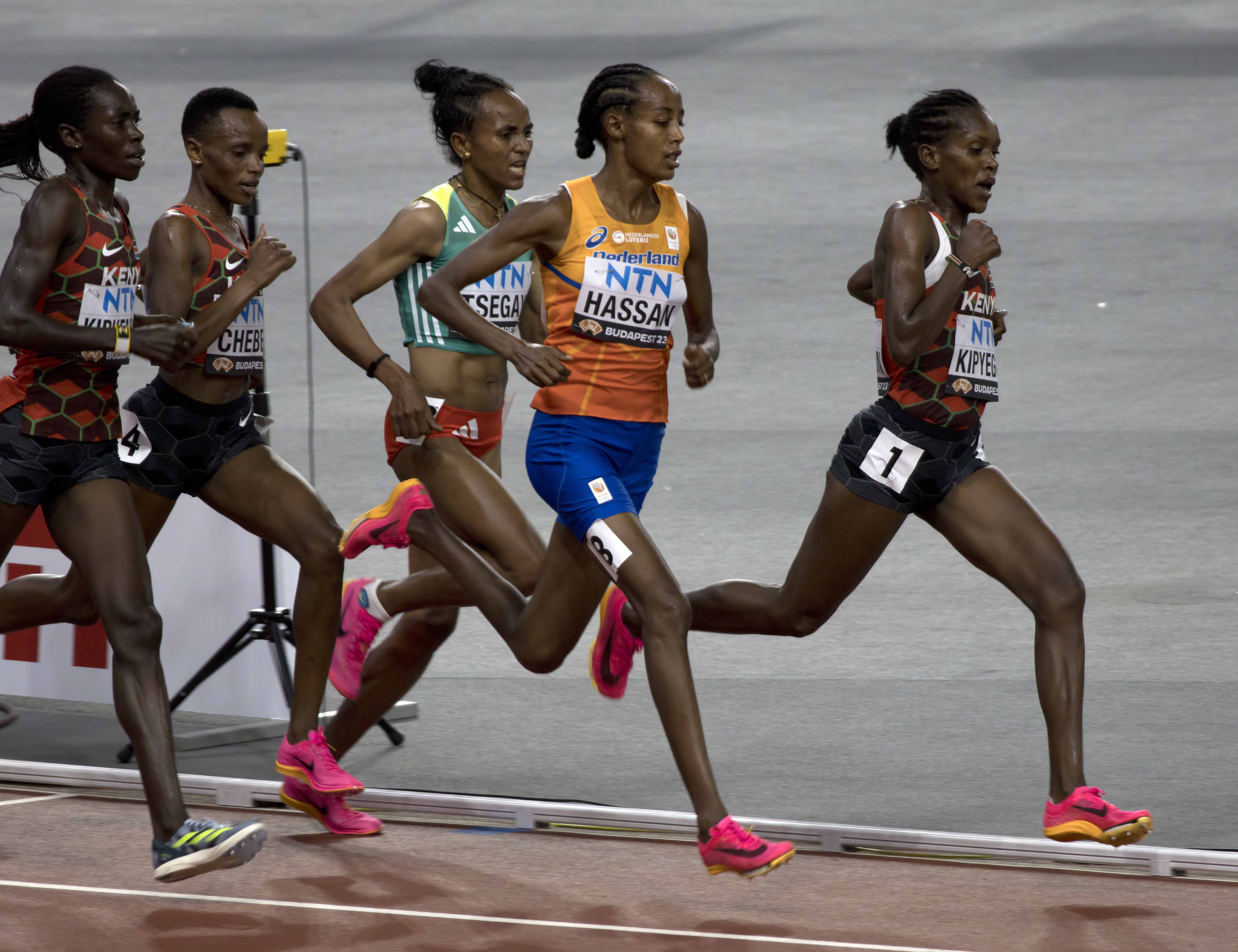
- The final underway.
- Venue: National Athletics Centre
- Dates: 23 August (heats); 26 August (final)
- Competitors: 40 from 23 nations
- Winning time: 14:53.88

Medalists
gold medal	Faith Kipyegon	Kenya
silver medal	Sifan Hassan	Netherlands
bronze medal	Beatrice Chebet	Kenya

The women's 5000 metres at the 2023 World Athletics Championships was held at the National Athletics Centre in Budapest on 23 and 26 August 2023.

The winning margin was 0.23 seconds which as of 2024 is the narrowest winning margin in the women's 5,000 metres at these championships.

== Summary ==
As temperatures rose in Budapest, meet officials moved the heats from Tuesday morning to Wednesday evening. Still, with the heats being conducted in the heat of 31°C (88°F) temperatures, the elite athletes had little interest in running a hard race except World U20 double Champion Agate Caune. In the first heat, the 19 year old captured the crowd by taking the pace out. After getting jostled in a tight slow moving pack for the first 200 metres, she stepped to the side and around the pack. Quickly, she separated from the pack, clicking off 70 second laps, while the peloton was doing more relaxed 73s. By the ninth lap, she had a 23 second, about 150 metre, advantage. Slowly the peloton began to reel in the rebellious teenager as the strain began to show on her face. 600 metres from the finish, 10,000 metre gold medalist Gudaf Tsegay started an extended kick for home. Returning silver medalist Beatrice Chebet and 2019 silver medalist Margaret Kipkemboi followed her and the pack stretched out, the gap to Caune was shrinking. She eventually was caught but kept her wits about her. Caune continued on to finish in fourth place qualifying her for the finals with a new personal best. In the second heat, they ran about 25 seconds faster, with the two favorites; new world record holder Faith Kipyegon and triple threat Olympic Champion Sifan Hassan sprinting it out to satisfy their competitive juices. Hassan won the heat by .02 seconds.

With all the drama just to qualify for the final, could the final live up? Even before the start, Caune did not appear due to a pelvic injury. With new rules in place, she was replaced at the last minute by the #17 qualifier Francine Niyomukunzi. The race started off with Tsegay moving out to a 65-second first lap opening up a gap. Then she backed off the accelerator, letting Ejgayehu Taye take the pace down to 75. Then she sped up to a 70 as both the Ethiopian and Kenyan teams dominated the front, then slowed down to 77. Kipyegon came forward to guide the pace to the slower speeds. Lilian Kasait Rengeruk took a couple of laps until Tsegay moved up to the 71 and a couple of 70-second laps. Through all these maneuvers, 14 women were still in contact with the lead, waiting. With a lap and a half to home, it was racing time. Kipyegon hit the front. Hassan moved up from mid-pack to Kipyegon's shoulder. The pace was quickening but only a few were dropping off the back. From 300 to 200 to go, they sped into a controlled sprint. Tsegay couldn't keep up. A gap appeared with Kipyegon, Hassan, and Chebet as the likely medalists. All three sprinted for home but the order and spacing didn't change. 13 women finished in less than 7 and a half seconds. Kipyegon got her double. After falling in the 10,000 finish, Hassan is leaving with medals in her other two events, anticipating running the Chicago Marathon in just 6 weeks.

== Records ==
Before the competition records were as follows:

Record	Athlete & Nat.	Perf.	Location	Date
World record	Faith Kipyegon (KEN)	14:05.20	Paris, France	9 June 2023
Championship record	Hellen Obiri (KEN)	14:26.72	Doha, Qatar	5 October 2019
World Leading	Faith Kipyegon (KEN)	14:05.20	Paris, France	9 June 2023
African Record	Faith Kipyegon (KEN)	14:05.20	Paris, France	9 June 2023
Asian Record	Bo Jiang (CHN)	14:28.09	Shanghai, China	23 October 1997
North, Central American and Caribbean record	Alicia Monson (USA)	14:19.45	London, United Kingdom	23 July 2023
South American Record	Joselyn Daniely Brea (VEN)	14:47.76	Walnut, United States	6 May 2023
European Record	Sifan Hassan (NED)	14:13.42	London, United Kingdom	23 July 2023
Oceanian record	Kim Smith (NZL)	14:39.89	New York, United States	27 February 2009

== Qualification standard ==
The standard to qualify automatically for entry was 14:57.00.

== Schedule ==
The event schedule, in local time (UTC +2), was as follows:

Date	Time	Round
23 August	19:02	Heats
26 August	20:50	Final

== Results ==
=== Heats ===
First 8 of each heat (Q) qualified to the final.

Rank	Heat	Name	Nationality	Time	Notes
1	2	Sifan Hassan	Netherlands	14:32.29	Q
2	2	Faith Kipyegon	Kenya	14:32.31	Q
3	2	Ejgayehu Taye	Ethiopia	14:33.23	Q
4	2	Freweyni Hailu	Ethiopia	14:34.16	Q
5	2	Lilian Kasait Rengeruk	Kenya	14:36.61	Q
6	2	Nozomi Tanaka	Japan	14:37.98	Q, NR
7	2	Nadia Battocletti	Italy	14:41.78	Q
8	2	Laura Galván	Mexico	14:43.94	Q, NR
9	1	Beatrice Chebet	Kenya	14:57.70	Q
10	1	Gudaf Tsegay	Ethiopia	14:57.72	Q
11	1	Margaret Chelimo Kipkemboi	Kenya	15:00.10	Q
12	1	Agate Caune	Latvia	15:00.48	WD, PB
13	1	Elise Cranny	United States	15:01.53	Q
14	1	Medina Eisa	Ethiopia	15:03.07	Q
15	1	Alicia Monson	United States	15:03.35	Q
16	1	Maureen Koster	Netherlands	15:05.13	Q
17	1	Francine Niyomukunzi	Burundi	15:05.24	Q
18	2	Natosha Rogers	United States	15:06.58	
19	1	Rose Davies	Australia	15:07.93	SB
20	1	Karoline Bjerkeli Grøvdal	Norway	15:08.96	
21	1	Ririka Hironaka	Japan	15:11.16	SB
22	2	Joselyn Daniely Brea	Venezuela	15:11.16	
23	2	Amy-Eloise Markovc	Great Britain & N.I.	15:13.66	SB
24	2	Camilla Richardsson	Finland	15:13.84	
25	1	Sarah Chelangat	Uganda	15:14.89	
26	2	Jessica Hull	Australia	15:15.89	
27	1	Megan Keith	Great Britain & N.I.	15:21.94	
28	1	Julie-Anne Staehli	Canada	15:24.09	
29	2	Mariana Machado	Portugal	15:28.97	
30	1	Viktória Wagner-Gyürkés	Hungary	15:29.42	
31	1	Ludovica Cavalli	Italy	15:32.95	
32	2	Anjelina Nadai Lohalith	Athlete Refugee Team	15:35.25	
33	2	Prisca Chesang	Uganda	15:37.02	
34	1	Lauren Ryan	Australia	15:40.23	
35	1	Briana Scott	Canada	15:42.56	
36	2	He Wuga	China	15:54.30	
37	2	Erin Teschuk	Canada	15:56.54	
38	1	Yuma Yamamoto	Japan	16:05.57	
	2	Fedra Aldana Luna Sambran	Argentina	DNF	
	2	Sarah Lahti	Sweden	DNS	

=== Final ===
The final was started on 26 August at 20:50.

Rank	Name	Nationality	Time	Notes
1st place, gold medalist(s)	Faith Kipyegon	Kenya	14:53.88	
2nd place, silver medalist(s)	Sifan Hassan	Netherlands	14:54.11	
3rd place, bronze medalist(s)	Beatrice Chebet	Kenya	14:54.33	
4	Margaret Chelimo Kipkemboi	Kenya	14:56.62	
5	Ejgayehu Taye	Ethiopia	14:56.85	
6	Medina Eisa	Ethiopia	14:58.23	
7	Freweyni Hailu	Ethiopia	14:58.31	
8	Nozomi Tanaka	Japan	14:58.99	
9	Elise Cranny	United States	14:59.22	
10	Laura Galván	Mexico	14:59.32	
10	Lilian Kasait Rengeruk	Kenya	14:59.32	
12	Maureen Koster	Netherlands	15:00.78	
13	Gudaf Tsegay	Ethiopia	15:01.13	
14	Alicia Monson	United States	15:04.08	
15	Francine Niyomukunzi	Burundi	15:15.01	
16	Nadia Battocletti	Italy	15:27.86	
