= 2021 World Athletics U20 Championships – Women's 5000 metres =

Women's 5000 metres at the 2021 World Athletics U20 Championships
- Venue: Kasarani Stadium
- Dates: 22 August
- Competitors: 10 from 7 nations
- Winning time: 16:05.61

Medalists
| gold medal | Mizan Alem | Ethiopia |
| silver medal | Prisca Chesang | Uganda |
| bronze medal | Zenah Cheptoo | Kenya |

The women's 5000 metres at the 2021 World Athletics U20 Championships was held at the Kasarani Stadium on 22 August.

== Records ==
Standing records prior to the 2021 World Athletics U20 Championships
| World U20 Record | Tirunesh Dibaba (ETH) | 14:30.88 | Bergen, Norway | 11 June 2004 |
| Championship Record | Genzebe Dibaba (ETH) | 15:08.06 | Moncton, Canada | 21 July 2010 |
| World U20 Leading | Mizan Alem (ETH) | 14:46.20 | Hengelo, Netherlands | 8 June 2021 |

== Results ==
The final was held on 22 August at 17:10.

| Rank | Name | Nationality | Time | Notes |
|---|---|---|---|---|
| 1st place, gold medalist(s) | Mizan Alem | Ethiopia | 16:05.61 | |
| 2nd place, silver medalist(s) | Prisca Chesang | Uganda | 16:21.78 | |
| 3rd place, bronze medalist(s) | Zenah Cheptoo | Kenya | 16:29.44 | |
| 4 | Carla Domínguez | Spain | 16:45.79 | |
| 5 | Maureen Cherotich | Kenya | 16:58.95 | |
| 6 | Oliwia Wawrzyniak | Poland | 17:17.59 | |
| 7 | Ankita | India | 17:17.68 | |
| 8 | Fiori Ghebrehiwot | Eritrea | 17:22.65 | |
| 9 | Scarlett Chebet | Uganda | 17:36.26 | |
| DSQ | Melknat Wudu | Ethiopia | ~~16:13.16~~ | DQ |
