= Aviva Grand Prix =

Aviva Grand Prix may refer to:

- Aviva Indoor Grand Prix, an annual indoor athletics meeting at the National Indoor Arena in Birmingham
- Aviva Birmingham Grand Prix, an annual outdoor athletics meeting held at Alexander Stadium
- Aviva London Grand Prix, an annual outdoor athletics meeting held at Crystal Palace
