= 2021 World Athletics U20 Championships – Women's 3000 metres =

Women's 3000 metres at the 2021 World Athletics U20 Championships
- Venue: Kasarani Stadium
- Dates: 19 August
- Competitors: 10 from 9 nations
- Winning time: 8:57.78

Medalists
gold medal	Teresia Muthoni Gateri	Kenya
silver medal	Zenah Jemutai Yego	Kenya
bronze medal	Prisca Chesang	Uganda

The women's 3000 metres at the 2021 World Athletics U20 Championships was held at the Kasarani Stadium on 19 August.

== Records ==
Standing records prior to the 2021 World Athletics U20 Championships
World U20 Record	Zola Pieterse (GBR)	8:28.83	Rome, Italy	7 September 1985
Championship Record	Beyenu Degefa (ETH)	8:41.76	Bydgoszcz, Poland	20 July 2016
World U20 Leading	Agnes Mwikali (KEN)	8:46.31	Abashiri, Japan	10 July 2021

== Results ==
The final was held on 19 August at 17:40.

Rank	Name	Nationality	Time	Note
1st place, gold medalist(s)	Teresia Muthoni Gateri	Kenya	8:57.78	
2nd place, silver medalist(s)	Zenah Jemutai Yego	Kenya	8:59.59	
3rd place, bronze medalist(s)	Prisca Chesang	Uganda	9:03.44	PB
4	Ilona Mononen	Finland	9:30.63	
5	Agate Caune	Latvia	9:45.26	
6	Semhar Mekonen	Eritrea	9:46.35	
7	Naledi Makgatha	South Africa	9:55.08	
8	Olimpia Breza	Poland	10:16.03	
9	Jeanine Kezimana	Burundi	10:33.47	
DSQ	Melknat Wudu	Ethiopia	~~9:00.12~~	DQ
