= 2022 World Athletics U20 Championships – Women's 5000 metres =

Women's 5000 metres at the 2022 World Athletics U20 Championships
- Venue: Estadio Olímpico Pascual Guerrero
- Dates: 6 August
- Competitors: 19 from 13 nations
- Winning time: 15:31.17

Medalists
gold medal	Prisca Chesang	Uganda
silver medal	Agate Caune	Latvia
bronze medal	Maria Forero	Spain

The women's 5000 metres at the 2022 World Athletics U20 Championships was held at the Estadio Olímpico Pascual Guerrero in Cali, Colombia on 6 August 2022.

19 athletes from 13 countries entered to the competition.

== Records ==
U20 standing records prior to the 2022 World Athletics U20 Championships were as follows:

Record	Athlete & Nationality	Mark	Location	Date
World U20 Record	Tirunesh Dibaba (ETH)	14:30.88	Bergen, Norway	11 June 2004
Championship Record	Genzebe Dibaba (ETH)	15:08.06	Moncton, Canada	21 July 2010
World U20 Leading	Janet Nyiva Mutungi (KEN)	15:03.34	Nobeoka, Japan	4 May 2022

== Results ==
The final race started at 16:27 on 6 August 2022. The results were as follows:

Rank	Name	Nationality	Time	Note
1st place, gold medalist(s)	Prisca Chesang	Uganda	15:31.17	
2nd place, silver medalist(s)	Agate Caune	Latvia	15:43.56	PB
3rd place, bronze medalist(s)	Maria Forero	Spain	16:26.39	
4	Jane Ghat Chacha	Kenya	16:29.62	
5	Maureen Cherotich	Kenya	16:33.30	
6	Analee Weaver	United States	16:35.74	
7	Maria Kassou	Greece	16:37.09	
8	Sadie Sigfstead	Canada	16:53.99	
9	Scarlet Chebet	Uganda	16:57.54	
10	Kira Weis	Germany	16:57.63	
11	Heidi Nielson	United States	17:13.97	
12	Linda Meier	Germany	17:19.94	
13	Laura Roderick	Australia	17:21.07	
14	Carla Domínguez	Spain	17:35.61	
15	Supriti Kachhap	India	17:44.58	
16	Karabo Motsoeneng	South Africa	18:35.51	
17	Chloe Turner	Canada	19:30.41	
DSQ	Medina Eisa	Ethiopia	~~15:29.71~~	DQ
DSQ	Melknat Wudu	Ethiopia	~~15:30.06~~	DQ
