= Briana Scott (runner) =

Canadian long-distance runner

Personal information
- Born: June 27, 1990 (age 36) Vancouver, British Columbia, Canada
- Education: McGill University
- Height: 6 ft 0 in (183 cm)

Sport
- Sport: Track and field
- Event: 5000 m
- University team: McGill Martlets (volleyball)
- Club: Mile2Marathon

Achievements and titles
- Personal bests: 1500 m: 4:12.61 (Victoria 2023); 3000 m: 8:57.52 (Seattle 2024); 5000 m: 15:19.51 (Langley 2023); 10,000 m: 33:14.99 (Burnaby 2021)

Briana Scott (née Hungerford; born 27 June 1990) is a Canadian long-distance runner. She is the 2023 Canadian 5000 m champion and represented Canada at the 2023 World Athletics Championships.

== Biography ==
Born and raised in Vancouver, British Columbia, Scott attended West Point Grey Academy before enrolling at McGill University in 2008. While at McGill, she competed for the McGill Martlets women's volleyball team.

After a long hiatus from sports, Scott took up running in 2018. Initially running half-marathons, she quickly improved, running a time of 1:18:21 in June 2019.

In 2020, without many races due to the ongoing pandemic, Scott turned to time trials. She ran 4:44 over the mile and later that summer, she improved her time to 4:39.

In 2021, Scott began training with the BC Endurance Project and quickly improved her times on the track. On May 29, she ran a time of 15:46.75 over 5000 m at Swangard Stadium in Burnaby. On June 18, she finished second to Malindi Elmore at the Canadian 10,000 m Championships, with a personal best of 33:14.99.

After a year off from competitive running due to the birth of her and her husband Derek's first child, Bennett in 2022, Scott returned to the track in 2023. In her second race of the season on May 6, she set a personal best of 15:40.58 in the 5000 m. The next month, she shaved 15 seconds off that time with a mark of 15:25.77 at the Portland Track Festival. On July 14, she ran another 5000 m, this time taking the win at the Harry Jerome Track Classic in 15:19.51. On July 27, competing at the Canadian Championships, Scott won her first national title, winning the 5000 m in 15:46.72.

Later that summer, Scott was selected to represent Canada at the 2023 World Athletics Championships in Budapest, Hungary. She ran 15:42.56 in her 5000 m heat.

In November, Scott competed at the Pan American Games in Santiago, Chile, placing 7th in the 5000 m.

== Competition record ==
Representing Canada
Year	Competition	Venue	Position	Event	Time
2023	World Championships	Budapest, Hungary	35th (h)	5000 m	15:42.56
2023	Pan American Games	Santiago, Chile	7th	5000 m	16:27.79
2024	Olympic Games	Paris, France	36th (h)	5000 m	15:47.30
