= Elise Cranny =

American middle and long-distance runner

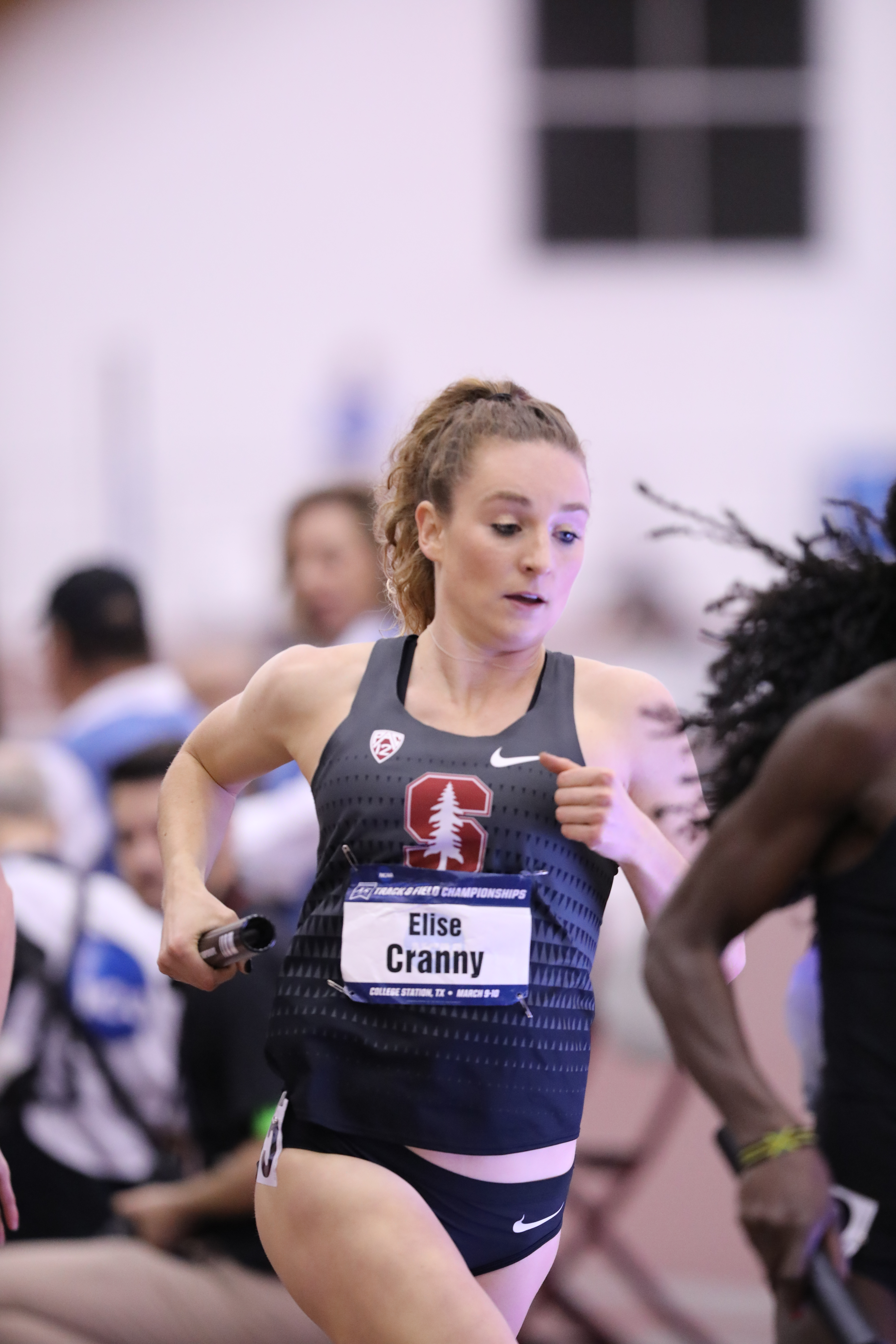
- Cranny in 2018

Personal information
- Nationality: American
- Born: May 9, 1996 (age 30)
- Home town: Niwot, Colorado, U.S.
- Height: 5 ft 4 in (163 cm)

Sport
- Sport: Track and field
- Events: 1500 m, 3000 m, 5000 m, 10,000 m
- College team: Stanford Cardinal
- Turned pro: 2018

Achievements and titles
- Olympic finals: 2020; 5,000 m, 13th 2024; 5,000 m, 11th
- World finals: 2022; 5,000 m, 9th 2023; 5,000 m, 9th 10,000 m, 12th 2025; 10,000 m, 12th
- Highest world ranking: 9th (5,000 m)
- Personal bests: Outdoor; 1500 m: 3:57.87 (Eugene 2024); Mile: 4:16.47 (Monaco 2023); 3000 m: 8:25.10 (Lausanne 2024); 5000 m: 14:40.36 (Eugene 2024); 10,000 m: 30:14.66 (San Juan Capistrano 2021); Indoor; Mile: 4:20.83 (Boston 2025); 3000 m: 8:29.87 (New York City 2025); 5000 m: 14:33.17 NR (Boston 2022)

Elise Cranny (born May 9, 1996) is an American middle and long-distance runner. She competed at the 2020 Summer Olympics and 2024 Summer Olympics. She is a four-time national champion and holds the American record in the indoor 5000 metres. She is also the third-fastest all-time American in the 10,000 meters.

== High school ==
Cranny attended Niwot High School in Colorado, where she won two cross country state championships, as well as two state track titles in the 800, 1600, and 3200. Cranny competed at the 2014 World Junior Championships and finished fourth in the 1500 m.

== College ==
Cranny attended Stanford University and competed for the Cardinal from 2014 to 2018. At the 2015 NCAA Division I Indoor Championships, she won the silver medal in the 3000 m. At the 2016 NCAA Division I Outdoor Championships, she won the silver medal in the 1500 m. At the 2018 NCAA Division I Indoor Championships, she finished fifth in the mile. At the 2018 NCAA Division I Outdoor Championships, she won the bronze medal in the 1500 m.

== Professional ==
After graduating from college in 2018, Cranny turned professional with the Bowerman Track Club. At a Bowerman inter-squad meet on July 31, 2020, she competed as a member of the 4 × 1500 m relay team alongside Colleen Quigley, Karissa Schweizer, and Shelby Houlihan. The team ran a time of 16:27.02, which broke the previous world record of 16:33.58 from Kenya.

=== 2021 ===
Cranny competed at the 2020 U.S. Olympic Trials, and she won the gold medal in the 5000 m to qualify for the Olympic team. Running in 94 degree heat, Cranny won the race with a time of 15:27.81, 0.3 seconds ahead of Bowerman teammate Karissa Schweizer. At the 2020 Summer Olympics, Cranny finished 13th in the 5000 m.

=== 2022 ===
In February, Cranny broke the American indoor record in the 5000 m at the David Hemery Valentine Invitational at Boston University. She had a time of 14:33.17, which was 14 seconds faster than Shalane Flanagan's mark of 14:47.

Cranny competed at the 2022 USA Outdoor Championships and won the gold medal in the 5000 m. At the 2022 World Championships, she finished ninth in the 5000 m.

=== 2023 ===
At the 2023 USA Outdoor Championships, Cranny won gold medals in the 5000 m and 10,000 m. She then competed at the 2023 World Championships, where she finished ninth in the 5000 m and 12th in the 10,000 m. After the 2023 season, Cranny left the Bowerman Track Club and returned to Boulder, Colorado to join Team Boss under coach Joe Bosshard.

=== 2024 ===
After only a few months with Team Boss, Cranny left the team at the end of February to be coached by Northern Arizona University associate head coach Jarred Cornfield. She then competed in the 2024 US Olympic Trials, placing second in the 5000m. At the 2024 Summer Olympics, she placed 11th in the 5000m.

In November 2024, it was announced that she had signed up for the inaugural season of the Michael Johnson founded Grand Slam Track.

=== 2025 ===
Cranny competed at the 2025 World Athletics Championships in Japan, placing 12th in the 10,000 meters. She also raced the 5,000 meters but did not advance out of the preliminary heats.

=== 2026 ===
In February, Cranny finished fifth in the 3,000 meters at the USA Indoor Track Championships. On the roads, she placed second at the Beach to Beacon 10K and seventh at the Falmouth Road Race.

== Competition record ==
=== Circuit performances ===
Grand Slam Track results
Slam	Race group	Event	Pl.	Time	Prize money
2025 Kingston Slam	Long distance	3000 m	6th	8:44.03	US$15,000
2025 Kingston Slam	Long distance	5000 m	6th	15:31.61	US$15,000
2025 Miami Slam	Long distance	5000 m	8th	15:15.31	US$10,000
2025 Miami Slam	Long distance	3000 m	7th	8:42.30	US$10,000
2025 Philadelphia Slam	Long distance	3000 m	5th	8:45.44	US$10,000

=== International competitions ===
Representing the United States
Year	Competition	Venue	Position	Event	Time
2021	Olympic Games	Tokyo, Japan	13th	5000 m	14:55.98
2022	World Athletics Championships	Eugene, Oregon	9th	5000 m	14:59.99
2023	World Athletics Championships	Budapest, Hungary	9th	5000 m	14:59.22
2023	World Athletics Championships	Budapest, Hungary	12th	10,000 m	31:57.51
2024	Olympic Games	Paris, France	11th	5000 m	14:48.06
2025	World Championships	Tokyo, Japan	18th (h)	5000 m	15:00.23
2025	World Championships	Tokyo, Japan	12th	10,000 m	31:40.07

=== National championships ===
Year	Competition	Venue	Position	Event	Notes
2014	US Junior Championships	Hayward Field; Eugene, Oregon	2nd	1500 m	4:17.40
2016	US Olympic Trials	Hayward Field; Eugene, Oregon	18th	1500 m	4:14.20
2019	2019 USA Outdoor Track and Field Championships	Drake Stadium; Des Moines, Iowa	9th	1500 m	4:06.19
2019	2019 USA Outdoor Track and Field Championships	Drake Stadium; Des Moines, Iowa	7th	5000 m	15:25.66
2021	US Olympic Trials	Hayward Field; Eugene, Oregon	1st	5000 m	15:27.81
2021	US Olympic Trials	Hayward Field; Eugene, Oregon	4th	10,000 m	31:35.22
2022	2022 USA Outdoor Track and Field Championships	Hayward Field; Eugene, Oregon	1st	5000 m	15:49.15
2023	2023 USA Outdoor Track and Field Championships	Hayward Field; Eugene, Oregon	1st	10,000 m	32:12.30
2023	2023 USA Outdoor Track and Field Championships	Hayward Field; Eugene, Oregon	1st	5000 m	14:52.66
2024	USA Olympic Trials	Hayward Field; Eugene, Oregon	2nd	5000 m	14:40.36
2024	USA Olympic Trials	Hayward Field; Eugene, Oregon	6th	1500 m	3:57.87
2025	2025 USA Outdoor Track and Field Championships	Hayward Field; Eugene, Oregon	2nd	10,000 m	31:44.24
2025	2025 USA Outdoor Track and Field Championships	Hayward Field; Eugene, Oregon	2nd	5,000 m	15:14.26
