= 2021 European Athletics U23 Championships – Men's 800 metres =

U23 event at 2021 European Athletics

Men's 800 metres at the 2021 European Athletics U23 Championships
- Venue: Kadriorg Stadium, Tallinn
- Dates: 9, 11 July
- Competitors: 26 from 15 nations
- Winning time: 1:46.20

Medalists
| gold medal | Simone Barontini | Italy |
| silver medal | Eliott Crestan | Belgium |
| bronze medal | Thomas Randolph | Great Britain |

The men's 800 metres event at the 2021 European Athletics U23 Championships was held in Tallinn, Estonia, at Kadriorg Stadium on 9 and 11 July.

== Records ==
Prior to the competition, the records were as follows:

| European U23 record | Yuriy Borzakovskiy (RUS) | 1:42.47 | Brussels, Belgium | 4 July 2012 |
| Championship U23 record | Nils Schumann (GER) | 1:45.21 | Gothenburg, Sweden | 1 August 1999 |

== Results ==
=== Round 1 ===
Qualification rule: First 2 in each heat (Q) and the next 2 fastest (q) advance to the Final.

| Rank | Heat | Name | Nationality | Time | Notes |
|---|---|---|---|---|---|
| 1 | 3 | Djoao Lobles | Netherlands | 1:46.73 | Q |
| 2 | 3 | Ben Pattison | Great Britain | 1:46.81 | Q |
| 3 | 3 | Pieter Sisk | Belgium | 1:46.88 | q |
| 4 | 3 | Jan Vukovič | Slovenia | 1:47.01 | q, PB |
| 5 | 1 | Eliott Crestan | Belgium | 1:47.43 | Q |
| 6 | 2 | Simone Barontini | Italy | 1:47.52 | Q |
| 7 | 1 | Thomas Randolph | Great Britain | 1:48.04 | Q |
| 8 | 2 | Finley McLear | Great Britain | 1:48.16 | Q |
| 9 | 3 | Kevin McGrath | Ireland | 1:48.68 | |
| 10 | 2 | Tibo De Smet | Belgium | 1:48.70 | |
| 11 | 1 | Mehmet Çelik | Turkey | 1:48.70 | |
| 12 | 1 | Ludo Van Nieuwenhuizen | Netherlands | 1:49.01 | |
| 13 | 2 | Louis O'Loughlin | Ireland | 1:49.43 | |
| 14 | 1 | Sacha Cultru | France | 1:49.68 | |
| 15 | 1 | José Ignacio Pérez | Spain | 1:49.94 | |
| 16 | 3 | Manuel Di Primio | Italy | 1:50.03 | |
| 17 | 2 | Cristian Gabriel Voicu | Romania | 1:50.20 | |
| 18 | 1 | Eduardas Rimas Survilas | Lithuania | 1:50.34 | |
| 19 | 1 | Robin Oester | Switzerland | 1:50.50 | |
| 20 | 3 | Elian Numa López Iglesias | Spain | 1:50.86 | |
| 21 | 2 | Stavros Spyrou | Cyprus | 1:51.62 | |
| 22 | 1 | Mark Milner | Ireland | 1:52.69 | |
| 23 | 3 | Murat Yalçınkaya | Turkey | 1:52.96 | |
| 24 | 2 | Karel-Sander Kljuzin | Estonia | 1:53.87 | |
| 25 | 2 | Anicet Kozar | France | 2:28.09 | |
| 26 | 2 | Oskar Schwarzer | Germany | 2:28.11 | |

=== Final ===
| Rank | Name | Nationality | Time | Notes |
|---|---|---|---|---|
| 1st place, gold medalist(s) | Simone Barontini | Italy | 1:46.20 | |
| 2nd place, silver medalist(s) | Eliott Crestan | Belgium | 1:46.32 | |
| 3rd place, bronze medalist(s) | Thomas Randolph | Great Britain | 1:46.41 | PB |
| 4 | Ben Pattison | Great Britain | 1:46.48 | |
| 5 | Djoao Lobles | Netherlands | 1:46.48 | |
| 6 | Finley McLear | Great Britain | 1:47.52 | |
| 7 | Pieter Sisk | Belgium | 1:47.99 | |
| 8 | Jan Vukovič | Slovenia | 1:48.26 | |
