= Athletics at the 2023 Pan American Games – Women's 5000 metres =

Women's 5000 metres at the 2023 Pan American Games
- Venue: Julio Martínez National Stadium
- Date: November 2, 2023
- Competitors: 7 from 5 nations
- Winning time: 16:04.12

Medalists
Gold medal	Joselyn Brea	Venezuela
Silver medal	Taylor Werner	United States
Bronze medal	Julie-Anne Staehli	Canada

The women's 5000 metres competition of the athletics events at the 2023 Pan American Games was held on November 2 at the Julio Martínez National Stadium.

== Records ==
Prior to this competition, the existing world and Pan American Games records were as follows:

World record	Gudaf Tsegai (ETH)	14:00.21	Orlando, Florida, United States	September 17, 2023
Pan American Games record	Adriana Fernández (MEX)	15:30.65	Santo Domingo, Dominican Republic	August 6, 2003

== Schedule ==
Date	Time	Round
November 2, 2023	19:25	Final

== Results ==
All times shown are in seconds.

KEY:	q	Fastest non-qualifiers	Q	Qualified	NR	National record	PB	Personal best	SB	Seasonal best	DQ	Disqualified

=== Final ===
The results were as follows:

Rank	Name	Nationality	Time	Notes
1st place, gold medalist(s)	Joselyn Brea	Venezuela	16:04.12	
2nd place, silver medalist(s)	Taylor Werner	United States	16:06.48	
3rd place, bronze medalist(s)	Julie-Anne Staehli	Canada	16:06.75	
4	Emily Infeld	United States	16:09.53	
5	Anahi Álvarez	Mexico	16:20.71	
6	Aisha Praught	Jamaica	16:23.06	
7	Briana Scott	Canada	16:27.79	
