= 2024 Meeting International Mohammed VI d'Athlétisme =

- Dates: 19 May 2024
- Host city: Marrakesh, Morocco
- Venue: Stade de Marrakech
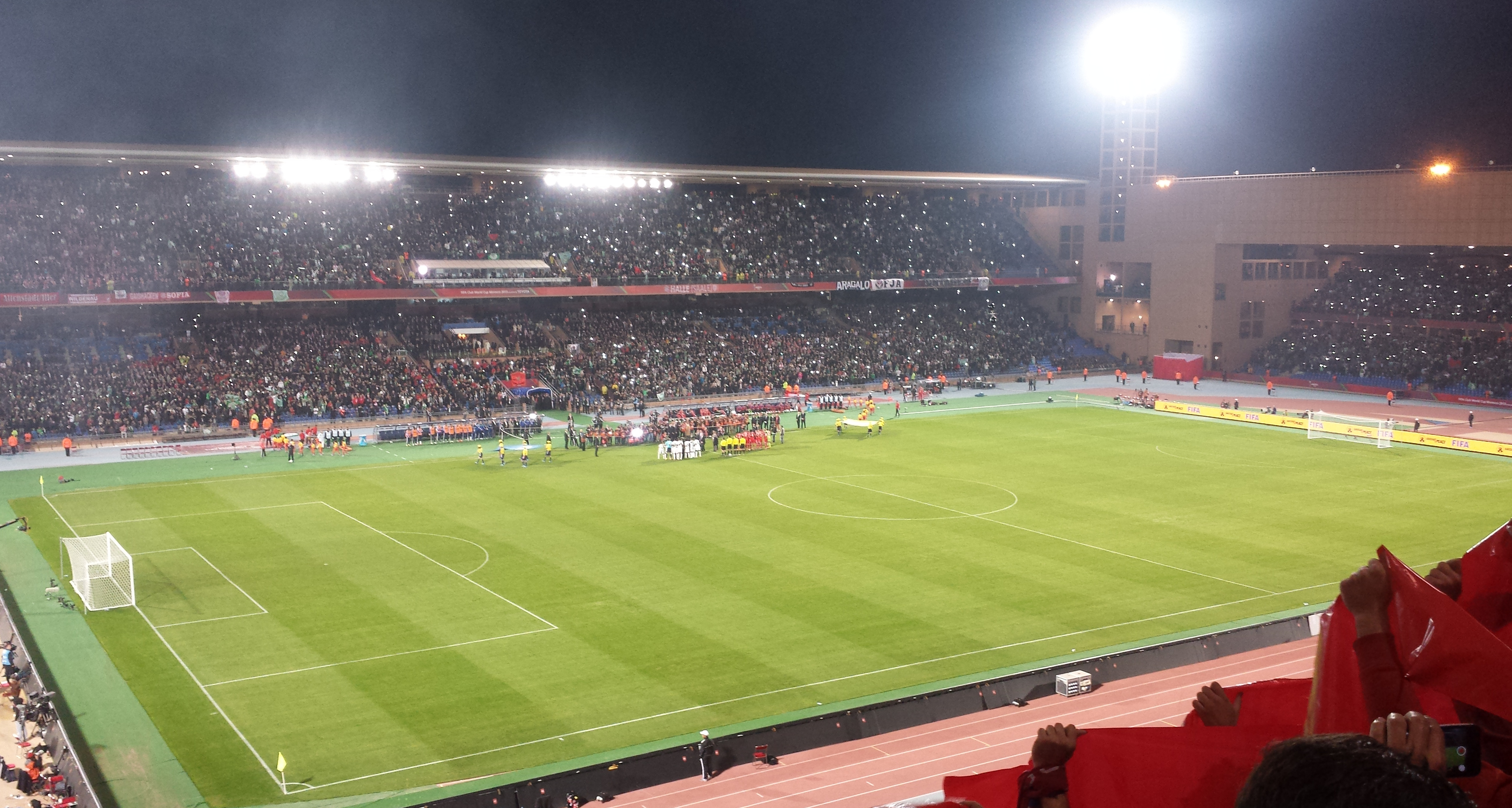
- Level: 2024 Diamond League

The 2024 Meeting International Mohammed VI d'Athlétisme was the 15th edition of the annual outdoor track and field meeting in Morocco. Held on 19 May at the Stade de Marrakech, it was the fourth leg of the 2024 Diamond League – the highest level international track and field circuit. Though the meeting is typically held in Rabat, in 2024 it was held in Marrakesh.

At the meeting, Prudence Sekgodiso set an 800 m world lead while Shericka Jackson won her Diamond League opener at 200 m, although her time of 22.82 seconds was not as fast as expected.

== Diamond events results ==
Athletes competing in the Diamond League disciplines earned extra compensation and points which went towards qualifying for the 2024 Diamond League finals. First place earned 8 points, with each step down in place earning one less point than the previous, until no points are awarded in 9th place or lower. In the case of a tie, each tying athlete earns the full amount of points for the place.

=== Men ===
100 Metres
Place	Athlete	Nation	Time	Points	Notes
1st place, gold medalist(s)	Emmanuel Eseme	Cameroon	10.11	8	SB
2nd place, silver medalist(s)	Andre De Grasse	Canada	10.19	7	
3rd place, bronze medalist(s)	Jeremiah Azu	Great Britain	10.25	6	
4	Brandon Hicklin	United States	10.26 [.256]	5	
5	Rohan Watson	Jamaica	10.26 [.259]	4	
6	PJ Austin	United States	10.29	3	
7	Jona Efoloko	Great Britain	10.36	2	
8	Yohan Blake	Jamaica	10.41	1	SB
9	Chakir Machmour	Morocco	10.69		
			Wind: (−0.8 m/s)		

400 Metres
Place	Athlete	Nation	Time	Points	Notes
1st place, gold medalist(s)	Alexander Doom	Belgium	44.51	8	PB
2nd place, silver medalist(s)	Muzala Samukonga	Zambia	44.54	7	SB
3rd place, bronze medalist(s)	Bayapo Ndori	Botswana	44.59	6	
4	Lythe Pillay	South Africa	44.78	5	
5	Emmanuel Bamidele	Nigeria	44.88	4	SB
6	Quincy Hall	United States	45.52	3	SB
7	Gilles Biron	France	45.71	2	
8	Hamza Dair	Morocco	46.48	1	

800 Metres
Place	Athlete	Nation	Time	Points	Notes
1st place, gold medalist(s)	Emmanuel Wanyonyi	Kenya	1:43.84	8	
2nd place, silver medalist(s)	Wyclife Kinyamal	Kenya	1:43.98	7	
3rd place, bronze medalist(s)	Yanis Meziane	France	1:44.13	6	SB
4	Tshepiso Masalela	Botswana	1:44.14	5	
5	Ben Pattison	Great Britain	1:44.75	4	SB
6	Adrián Ben	Spain	1:45.21	3	SB
7	Daniel Rowden	Great Britain	1:45.37	2	SB
8	Abdelati El Guesse	Morocco	1:45.70	1	
9	Emmanuel Korir	Kenya	1:52.14		SB
—	Ludovic Le Meur	France	DNF		PM

1500 Metres
Place	Athlete	Nation	Time	Points	Notes
1st place, gold medalist(s)	Azeddine Habz	France	3:32.86	8	SB
2nd place, silver medalist(s)		Great Britain	3:33.47	7	SB
3rd place, bronze medalist(s)	Elliot Giles	Great Britain	3:33.50	6	SB
4	Lamecha Girma	Ethiopia	3:33.54	5	SB
5	Adel Mechaal	Spain	3:34.22	4	SB
6	Hafid Rizqy	Morocco	3:34.52	3	PB
7	Teddese Lemi	Ethiopia	3:34.83	2	SB
8	Tshepo Tshite	South Africa	3:35.21	1	
9	Kuma Girma	Ethiopia	3:36.60		PB
10	Elhassane Moujahid	Morocco	3:37.01		SB
11	Ryan Mphahlele	South Africa	3:39.34		
12	Abdelatif Sadiki	Morocco	3:40.38		SB
13	Charles Grethen	Luxembourg	3:40.90		SB
14	Vincent Kibet Keter	Kenya	3:46.75		
—	Mounir Akbache	France	DNF		PM
—	Alexandre Selles	France	DNF		PM

3000 Metres steeplechase
Place	Athlete	Nation	Time	Points	Notes
1st place, gold medalist(s)	Soufiane El Bakkali	Morocco	8:09.40	8	SB
2nd place, silver medalist(s)	Getnet Wale	Ethiopia	8:09.78	7	
3rd place, bronze medalist(s)	Amos Serem	Kenya	8:10.82	6	SB
4	Samuel Firewu	Ethiopia	8:11.73	5	
5	Daniel Arce	Spain	8:12.28	4	SB
6	Hillary Bor	United States	8:13.30	3	SB
7	Djilali Bedrani	France	8:13.73	2	SB
8	Mohamed Amin Jhinaoui	Tunisia	8:13.86	1	SB
9	Abraham Kibiwot	Kenya	8:17.07		
10	Mohamed Tindouft	Morocco	8:17.22		SB
11	Osama Zoghlami	Italy	8:19.54		SB
12	Salaheddine Ben Yazide	Morocco	8:20.06		SB
13	Ahmed Jaziri	Tunisia	8:20.49		SB
14	Ryuji Miura	Japan	8:21.74		
15	Abrham Sime	Ethiopia	8:23.74		SB
16	Faid El Mostafa	Morocco	8:24.51		PB
17	Benjamin Kigen	Kenya	8:28.69		
18	Conseslus Kipruto	Kenya	8:43.61		SB
—	Simon Sundström	Sweden	DNF		
—	Abderrafia Bouassel	Morocco	DNF		PM

Triple jump
Place	Athlete	Nation	Distance	Points	Notes
1st place, gold medalist(s)		Cuba	17.10 m (−0.4 m/s)	8	MR, SB
2nd place, silver medalist(s)	Pedro Pichardo	Portugal	16.92 m (−0.2 m/s)	7	
3rd place, bronze medalist(s)	Almir dos Santos	Brazil	16.90 m (−0.7 m/s)	6	
4	Max Heß	Germany	16.85 m (+0.2 m/s)	5	SB
5	Jean-Marc Pontvianne	France	16.42 m (−1.2 m/s)	4	
6		Portugal	16.31 m (+0.5 m/s)	3	
7		United States	16.16 m (−0.1 m/s)	2	
8	Benjamin Compaoré	France	16.10 m (+0.1 m/s)	1	

Discus throw
Place	Athlete	Nation	Distance	Points	Notes
1st place, gold medalist(s)	Mykolas Alekna	Lithuania	70.70 m	8	
2nd place, silver medalist(s)	Matthew Denny	Australia	67.74 m	7	
3rd place, bronze medalist(s)	Daniel Ståhl	Sweden	67.49 m	6	
4	Traves Smikle	Jamaica	66.04 m	5	
5	Andrius Gudžius	Lithuania	65.21 m	4	SB
6	Fedrick Dacres	Jamaica	65.05 m	3	
7	Kristjan Čeh	Slovenia	64.64 m	2	
8	Lukas Weißhaidinger	Austria	64.44 m	1	
9	Martynas Alekna	Lithuania	63.93 m		
10	Sam Mattis	United States	62.73 m		
—	Lawrence Okoye	Great Britain	NM		

=== Women ===
200 Metres
Place	Athlete	Nation	Time	Points	Notes
1st place, gold medalist(s)	Shericka Jackson	Jamaica	22.82	8	SB
2nd place, silver medalist(s)	Maboundou Koné	Ivory Coast	22.96	7	
3rd place, bronze medalist(s)	Hélène Parisot	France	23.02	6	PB
4	Caisja Chandler	United States	23.06	5	SB
5	Mujinga Kambundji	Switzerland	23.14	4	
6	Ida Karstoft	Denmark	23.40	3	
7	Dalia Kaddari	Italy	23.48	2	SB
8	Sara El-Hachimi	Morocco	24.21	1	SB
			Wind: (−1.0 m/s)		

800 Metres
Place	Athlete	Nation	Time	Points	Notes
1st place, gold medalist(s)	Prudence Sekgodiso	South Africa	1:57.26	8	WL, PB
2nd place, silver medalist(s)	Habitam Alemu	Ethiopia	1:57.70	7	SB
3rd place, bronze medalist(s)	Noélie Yarigo	Benin	1:59.96	6	
4	Gabriela Gajanová	Slovakia	2:00.30	5	SB
5	Eloisa Coiro	Italy	2:00.35	4	SB
6	Rachel Klopfenstein	Switzerland	2:00.95	3	SB
7	Anita Horvat	Slovenia	2:01.38	2	SB
8	Assia Raziki	Morocco	2:01.42	1	SB
9	Soukaina Hajji	Morocco	2:03.05		SB
10	Kristie Schoffield	United States	2:03.25		
—	Firezewid Tesfaye	Ethiopia	DNF		PM

5000 Metres
Place	Athlete	Nation	Time	Points	Notes
1st place, gold medalist(s)	Medina Eisa	Ethiopia	14:34.16	8	
2nd place, silver medalist(s)	Fotyen Tesfay	Ethiopia	14:34.21	7	PB
3rd place, bronze medalist(s)	Edinah Jebitok	Kenya	14:35.64	6	PB
4	Melknat Wudu	Ethiopia	14:39.79	5	SB
5	Likina Amebaw	Ethiopia	14:44.06	4	PB
6	Maureen Koster	Netherlands	14:50.74	3	SB
7	Nadia Battocletti	Italy	15:02.69	2	SB
8	Gela Hambese	Ethiopia	15:06.24	1	
9	Esther Chebet	Uganda	15:09.48		SB
10	Frehiwot Gesese	Ethiopia	15:26.22		SB
11	Bontu Rebitu	Bahrain	15:49.07		SB
—	Diane van Es	Netherlands	DNF		
—	Tegab Berhe	Ethiopia	DNF		PM
—	Alganesh Berehe	Ethiopia	DNF		PM

400 Metres hurdles
Place	Athlete	Nation	Time	Points	Notes
1st place, gold medalist(s)	Rushell Clayton	Jamaica	53.98	8	
2nd place, silver medalist(s)	Shiann Salmon	Jamaica	54.27	7	SB
3rd place, bronze medalist(s)	Anna Ryzhykova	Ukraine	55.09	6	SB
4	Zenéy Geldenhuys	South Africa	55.28	5	
5	Janieve Russell	Jamaica	55.74	4	SB
6	Viivi Lehikoinen	Finland	55.81	3	SB
7	Noura Ennadi	Morocco	56.15	2	
8		Great Britain	56.71	1	

High jump
Place	Athlete	Nation	Height	Points	Notes
1st place, gold medalist(s)	Angelina Topić	Serbia	1.98 m	8	NR
2nd place, silver medalist(s)	Christina Honsel	Germany	1.91 m	7	SB
3rd place, bronze medalist(s)	Lia Apostolovski	Slovenia	1.91 m	6	SB
4	Buse Savaşkan	Turkey	1.87 m	5	
4	Nawal Meniker	France	1.87 m	5	
4	Morgan Lake	Great Britain	1.87 m	5	
4	Safina Sadullayeva	Uzbekistan	1.87 m	5	SB
8	Solène Gicquel	France	1.87 m	1	
9	Nadezhda Dubovitskaya	Kazakhstan	1.81 m		
10	Safae Maskani	Morocco	1.75 m		=PB

Pole vault
Place	Athlete	Nation	Height	Points	Notes
1st place, gold medalist(s)	Angelica Moser	Switzerland	4.73 m	8	SB
2nd place, silver medalist(s)	Roberta Bruni	Italy	4.65 m	7	SB
3rd place, bronze medalist(s)	Elisa Molinarolo	Italy	4.55 m	6	SB
3rd place, bronze medalist(s)	Katerina Stefanidi	Greece	4.55 m	6	
5	Alix Dehaynain	France	4.45 m	4	PB
6	Tina Šutej	Slovenia	4.45 m	3	
7	Olivia McTaggart	New Zealand	4.45 m	2	SB
8	Imogen Ayris	New Zealand	4.45 m	1	

Shot put
Place	Athlete	Nation	Distance	Points	Notes
1st place, gold medalist(s)	Chase Jackson	United States	20.00 m	8	MR
2nd place, silver medalist(s)	Yemisi Mabry	Germany	19.40 m	7	SB
3rd place, bronze medalist(s)	Sarah Mitton	Canada	19.36 m	6	
4	Danniel Thomas-Dodd	Jamaica	18.54 m	5	
5	Maggie Ewen	United States	18.37 m	4	
6	Adelaide Aquilla	United States	18.13 m	3	
7	Jessica Schilder	Netherlands	18.11 m	2	
8	Jessica Woodard	United States	17.91 m	1	

== National events results ==
=== Men ===
200 Metres
Place	Athlete	Nation	Time	Notes
1st place, gold medalist(s)	Amine Ait Elhadj	Morocco	21.25	
2nd place, silver medalist(s)	Mustapha Ibenkhaldoun	Morocco	21.48	
3rd place, bronze medalist(s)	Abdelkarim Bebouchaibe	Morocco	21.68	
4	Walid El Boussiri	Morocco	21.74	
5	Yassine Akkad	Morocco	22.01	
6	Adam Fourar	Morocco	22.07	
7	Mohamed Eddraoui	Morocco	22.45	
			Wind: (+0.3 m/s)	

400 Metres
Place	Athlete	Nation	Time	Notes
1st place, gold medalist(s)	Mohamed Yassine Zerhoumi	Morocco	46.74	
2nd place, silver medalist(s)	Rachid Mhamdi	Morocco	47.10	
3rd place, bronze medalist(s)	Said el Guebbaz	Morocco	47.73	
4	Yassine Hssine	Morocco	48.16	
5	Lahssen Taleb	Morocco	48.35	
6	Aymen Dkouk	Morocco	48.78	
—	Elmehdi Dimmokrati	Morocco	DNF	
—	Kamal Mottakil	Morocco	DQ	TR 16.8

800 Metres
Place	Athlete	Nation	Time	Notes
1st place, gold medalist(s)	Abderahmane Laasal	Morocco	1:47.52	
2nd place, silver medalist(s)	Salah-Eddine Boussaad	Morocco	1:49.03	
3rd place, bronze medalist(s)	Marouane Ennadi	Morocco	1:49.09	
4	Imad Bouchajda	Morocco	1:49.55	
5	Ayoub Elfakhar	Morocco	1:49.89	
6	Mohamed Dahmouch	Morocco	1:50.15	
7	Yassine Benyoussef	Morocco	1:50.78	
8	Ahmed Rahioui	Morocco	1:50.95	
9	Taha Ouchen	Morocco	1:52.17	
10	Soufiane Zraidi	Morocco	1:52.55	
11	Aziz Haiti	Morocco	1:53.07	
12	Hamid Boutfidi	Morocco	1:54.31	
13	Oussama Fagrach	Morocco	1:54.39	
14	Ayoub Lalij	Morocco	1:56.47	
15	Abdelhafed Ahajri	Morocco	1:56.86	
—	Mohamed Lagraini	Morocco	DNF	

=== Women ===
200 Metres
Place	Athlete	Nation	Time	Notes
1st place, gold medalist(s)	Natacha Ngoye Akamabi	Congo	23.28	
2nd place, silver medalist(s)	Salma Lehlali	Morocco	24.20	
3rd place, bronze medalist(s)	Houda Nouiri	Morocco	24.57	
4	Hajar Eddou	Morocco	24.73	
5	Salma el Ouarrate	Morocco	25.59	
6	Loubna Housaini	Morocco	25.80	
7	Nihal Ghoudrani	Morocco	26.04	
8	Kaltoum el Barbouchi	Morocco	26.11	
			Wind: (+0.5 m/s)	

800 Metres
Place	Athlete	Nation	Time	Notes
1st place, gold medalist(s)	Souad Elhaddad	Morocco	2:06.95	
2nd place, silver medalist(s)	Lamyae Abbassi	Morocco	2:08.75	
3rd place, bronze medalist(s)	Fatima Aafir	Morocco	2:10.09	
4	Kawtar Elhirach	Morocco	2:10.33	
5	Ahlam Barghout	Morocco	2:11.12	
6	Slimi Douae	Morocco	2:15.84	
7	Hasnaa Essadik	Morocco	2:16.42	
8	Aya Ammari	Morocco	2:18.85	
9	Wijdane Inzaline	Morocco	2:19.02	

== See also ==
- 2024 Diamond League
