= Prisca Chesang =

Ugandan long-distance runner

Personal information
- Nationality: Ugandan
- Born: 7 August 2003 (age 22)

Sport
- Country: Uganda
- Sport: Athletics
- Events: Middle-, Long-distance running
Medal record
Women's athletics
Representing Uganda
World U20 Championships
Gold medal – first place	2022 Cali	5000 m
Silver medal – second place	2021 Nairobi	5000 m
Bronze medal – third place	2021 Nairobi	3000 m
World Cross Country Championships
Bronze medal – third place	2023 Bathurst	Senior team

Prisca Chesang (born 7 August 2003) is a Ugandan middle- and long-distance runner. She won the gold medal in the 5000 metres at the 2022 World Athletics Under-20 Championships and the silver medal in the 5000 metres and the bronze medal in the 3000 metres at the 2021 World Athletics Under-20 Championships (after Medina Eisa and Melknat Wudu were given a two-year ban for age falsification violations and stripped of their medals in those events).

== Career ==
Chesang represented Uganda at the 2020 Tokyo Olympics, competing in the women's 5000 metres event.

She competed in the 3000 metres at the 2021 World Athletics Under-20 Championships, winning the bronze medal with a personal best time of 9:03.44 (originally finishing fourth, however Melknat Wudu was given a two-year ban for age falsification violations and stripped of her bronze medal). She competed also in the 5000 metres at the 2021 World Athletics Under-20 Championships and won the silver medal (originally finished third, however Melknat Wudu was given a two-year ban for age falsification violations and stripped of her silver medal).

Chesang won the gold medal in the 5000 metres at the 2022 World Athletics Under-20 Championships (originally finished second, however Medina Eisa was given a two-year ban for age falsification violations and stripped of her gold medal). The 19-year-old won the 2022 San Silvestre Vallecana road 10 km (not eligible for record purposes) in a time of 30:19, beating Francine Niyonsaba, fifth in the 10,000 m at the Tokyo Games, and Beatrice Chepkoech, world record holder in the 3000 m steeplechase.

== Doping ban ==
In January 2024 Chesang received a two year competition ban after testing positive for furosemide in September 2023. The ban is set to run from 6 December 2023.

== Achievements ==
=== Personal bests ===
- 1500 metres – 4:08.15 (Nice 2021)
- 3000 metres – 9:03.44 (Nairobi 2021)
- 10,000 metres – 15:05.39 (Hengelo 2021)

Road

- 10 kilometres – 32:42 (Bengaluru 2022)

=== National titles ===
- Ugandan Championships
  - 1500 metres: 2022
  - 5000 metres: 2022
