= Thomas Randolph (runner) =

British athlete (born 1999)

Personal information
- Born: 7 February 1999 (age 27)

Sport
- Sport: Athletics
- Event: Middle distance running

Achievements and titles
- Personal best(s): 800m: 1:44.88 (London, 2023)
Medal record
Men's athletics
Representing Great Britain
European U23 Championships
Bronze medal – third place	2021 Tallinn	800 m

Thomas Randolph (born 7 February 1999) is a British middle distance runner.

== Career ==
He was a bronze medalist in the 800 metres at the 2021 European Athletics U23 Championships in Tallinn. In August 2021, he won the British Milers Club points title.

After his 2022 season was affected by injury, he ran close to his personal best in Oslo in June 2023, with a time of 1:45.75 for the 800 metres. In July 2023, he ran a personal best time of 1:44.88 at the London Diamond League event. He won the Tampere Motonet Grand Prix, in Finland on August 8, 2023 with an 800m time of 1:45.35.

In November 2023, he was named by British Athletics among the athletes on the Olympic Futures Programme for 2023-24.

In May 2024, he finished second to Callum Dodds at the Belfast Milers Meet, finishing just outside his personal best in 1:44.91. That month, he was selected to run the 800 metres for Britain at the 2024 European Athletics Championships in Rome.

He finished third over 800 metres whilst competing at the 2025 British Indoor Athletics Championships in Birmingham, on 23 February 2025. He was selected for the British team for the 2025 European Athletics Indoor Championships in Apeldoorn.

== Personal life ==
He is from Tamworth, Staffordshire.
