= Athletics at the 2023 African Games – Women's 5000 metres =

The women's 5000 metres event at the 2023 African Games was held on 18 March 2024 in Accra, Ghana.

== Results ==
Rank	Name	Nationality	Time	Notes
1st place, gold medalist(s)	Medina Eisa	Ethiopia	15:04.32	
2nd place, silver medalist(s)	Birtukan Molla	Ethiopia	15:05.32	
3rd place, bronze medalist(s)	Melknat Wudu	Ethiopia	15:07.04	
4	Beatrice Chepkoech	Kenya	15:13.71	
5	Francine Niyomukunzi	Burundi	15:33.17	
6	Samia Hassan	Djibouti	15:35.14	
7	Ahmed Djama Habone	Djibouti	15:49.82	
8	Emeline Imanizabayo	Rwanda	15:56.20	
9	Hamida Nassoro	Tanzania	16:14.78	
10	Micheline Niyomahoro	Burundi	16:37.12	
11	Yordanos Habteslassie	Eritrea	16:41.05	
12	Awa Kleinmann	Mali	17:10.25	
13	Theresa Kargbo	Sierra Leone	17:38.82	
14	Nyima Camara	The Gambia	18:33.80	NR
	Mussa Transfora	Tanzania	DNS	
