= Julie-Anne Staehli =

Canadian athlete

Julie-Anne Staehli OLY
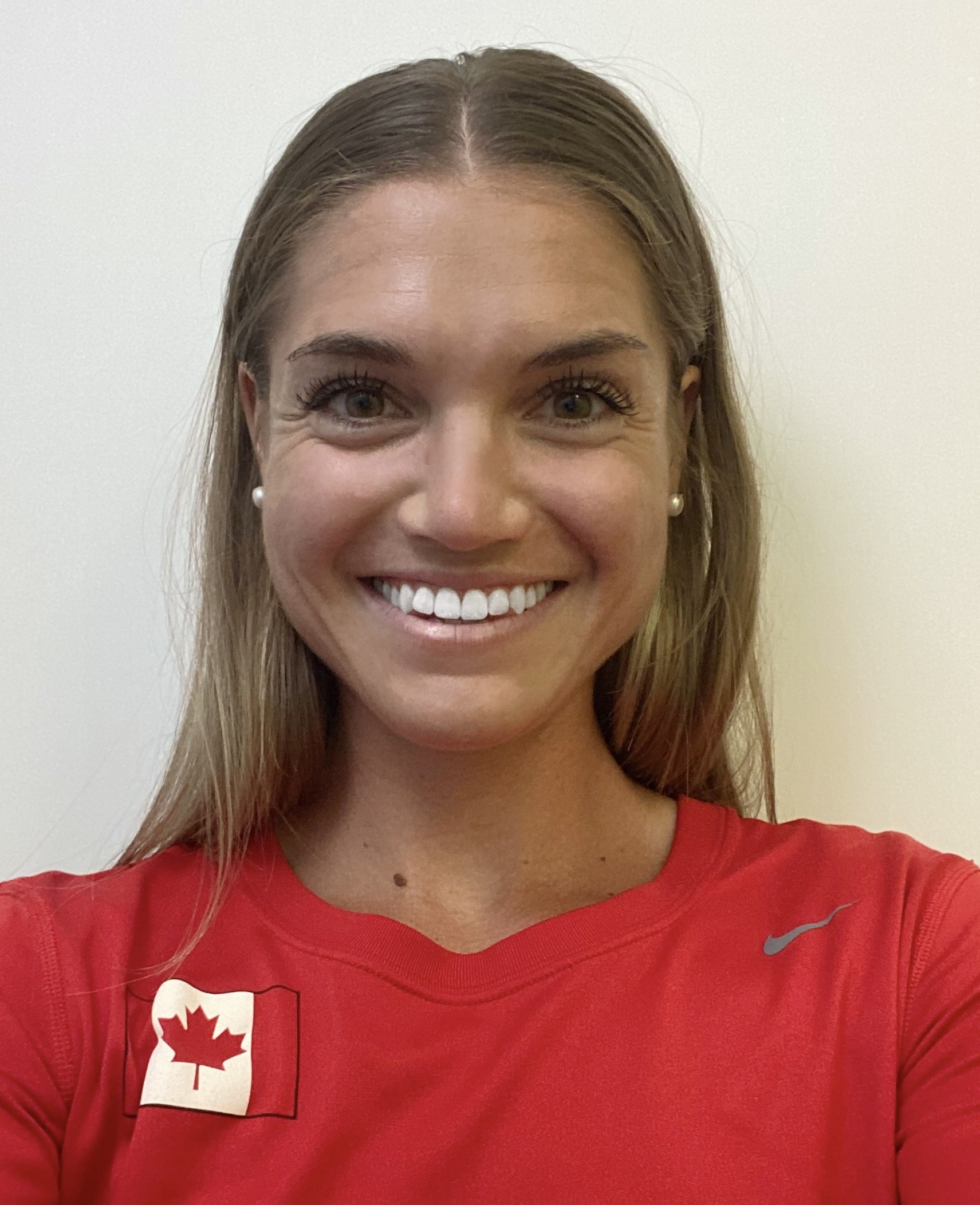
- Staehli in 2021

Personal information
- Born: December 21, 1993 (age 32) Goderich, Ontario, Canada
- Occupations: Athlete (Team Canada) & Co-Founder The ReRun Shoe Project)
- Height: 165 cm (5 ft 5 in)
- Weight: 57 kg (126 lb)
- Website: www.jastaehli.com

Sport
- Sport: Track and Field
- Event: Middle Distance
- Team: New Balance Boston
- Coached by: Mark Coogan (2021 - Present), Steve Boyd (2012 - 2021)

Achievements and titles
- Personal bests: 1,500 m: 4:04.82 (Mission Viejo, CA, 2001); 1 mile: 4:34.00 (Washington DC, 2019); 3,000 m: 8:51.98 (Montreal, 2021); 2 mile: 9:22.66i (Staten Island, NY, 2021); 5,000 m: 14:57.50 (Portland, OR, 2021)
Medal record
Women's track and field
Representing Canada
Pan American Games
Bronze medal – third place	2023 Santiago	5000 m
NACAC U23 Championships in Athletics
Bronze medal – third place	2014 Kamloops	3000 metres steeplechase

Julie-Anne Staehli (born December 21, 1993) is a Canadian Olympian, professional track and field athlete, and runner representing Team New Balance Boston, specializing in the 5,000 m event.

== Early life ==
Julie-Anne grew up on a farm outside of the small town of Lucknow, Ontario, where she began running on the backroads. Over the course of her elementary and high school years, she participated in various sports, including cross-country running, skiing and snowboarding in the fall/winter and track, triathlon and soccer in the summer. Running became the focus in her senior year of high school when she led her team to an OFSAA cross country title and won the individual gold in the 1,500m steeplechase.

== Running career ==
In 2012, Julie-Anne moved to Kingston, ON, to attend Queen's University. During her five years as a varsity athlete, she achieved 12 podium finishes, becoming the first 5-Time All Canadian in the history of the school, and made her first National Team, representing Canada at the 2014 FISU World University Cross Country Championships. At the 2014 NACAC U23 Championships in Athletics in Kamloops, Staehli won the bronze medal in the 3000 metres steeplechase.

Since then, Julie-Anne has made 5 Senior National Teams and made the Canada's 2020 Olympic team in the women's 5,000 metres at the Tokyo 2020 Olympic Games. She moved to Boston in the fall of 2021 to run professionally with Team New Balance Boston and has recently competed at the 2022 World Indoor Championships and Commonwealth Games. Julie-Anne competed at the 2020 Summer Olympics in the 5,000m, is the Canadian record holder in the indoor 2 Mile, has the second fastest Canadian indoor 3,000m and is the 4th fastest Canadian of all time in the 5,000m. She is also a two-time Canadian Champion (2021 Olympic Trials / 2022 5K Road Championships).

Julie-Anne represented Canada in events worldwide, including the Commonwealth Games, World Indoor Championships, World Cross Country Championships, Pan American Cross Country Cup, NACAC Track Championships, and the FISU World Cross Country Championships.

== Education ==
Alongside Julie-Anne's running career, she completed her Bachelor of Arts Honours in Health Studies at the School of Kinesiology and Health Studies, Queen's University (2016), her Master of Science in Sport Psychology, specializing in team leadership and organization in the high-performance sport context, from the School of Kinesiology and Health Studies at Queen's University (2020), and her Bachelor of Education, Intermediate-Senior at Western University (2021).

== Coaching ==
=== Queen's University (2014–2017) ===
Julie-Anne initially began her coaching and mentoring opportunities at Queen's University in 2014 as a Student-Athlete Academic Mentor with the Queen's University Athlete Services assisting first-year student-athletes transitioning from high school to university in both their academics and athletics. Between 2013 and 2017, Julie-Anne was also heavily involved with the Queen's University Varsity Leadership Council as a Team Lead, supporting fundraisers and volunteer programs in the Kingston, Ontario, community. In 2017, Julie-Anne stepped into an Assistant Cross Country Coach role with the Queen's University Gaels. Throughout her university career, she was also the Head Lifeguard and Advanced Instructor with the Queen's University Athletics & Recreation facility, teaching beginner and advanced swim lessons.

=== Western University (2018–2019) ===
Julie-Anne Staehli entered her first season as Assistant Coach of the Western Mustang's Cross Country Team for the 2018–19 season.

== The ReRUN Shoe Project ==
Co-Founded alongside Kurtis Marlow, Julie-Anne started The ReRUN Shoe Project in 2016 to get shoes in the hands of Canadians in need who might not otherwise have a quality pair of shoes to participate in an active lifestyle. By establishing ongoing drop-off locations where runners can bring their lightly used shoes, The ReRUN Shoe Project hopes to connect with fellow athletes and help them give back to their local communities. In doing so, together, they look to reduce, reuse, and pass on the gift of running.

== Theses and dissertations ==
- Staehli, J., Martin, L.M., Côté, J. (2018). A Blueprint for Student-Athlete Success: Understanding the Conditions Implemented by High Performance Coaches. Paper presented at the Eastern Canada Sport and Exercise Psychology Symposium, Montreal, QC, Canada.
- Staehli, J., Martin, L.J, & Côté, J. (2021). Condition Setting in Sport: A Case Study Approach to Explore Program Planning by Canadian University Coaches. International Sport Coaching Journal, 9(1).
