= Mizan Alem =

Ethiopian long-distance runner

Personal information
- Full name: Mizan Alem Adane
- Nationality: Ethiopian
- Born: 22 January 2002 (age 24)

Sport
- Country: Ethiopia
- Sport: Athletics
- Event: Long-distance running
Medal record
Women's athletics
Representing Ethiopia
World U20 Championships
Gold medal – first place	2021 Nairobi	5000 m

Mizan Alem (born 22 January 2002) is an Ethiopian long-distance runner. She won the gold medal in the 5000 metres at the 2021 World Under-20 Championships.

== Career ==
Alem gained her first international experience at age 17, in March 2019, finishing seventh in the under-20 women's race (5.856 km) at the World Cross Country Championships held in Aarhus, Denmark.

In August 2021, she claimed the gold medal in the 5000 metres at the World U20 Championships in Nairobi, Kenya.

The 21-year-old placed second in the 3000 metres standings of the 2023 World Athletics Indoor Tour, finishing also second behind only Gudaf Tsegay at the tour's Birmingham Final with a new personal best of 8:31.20. In May that year, at a London meet called "The Night of the 10,000m PBs", Alem set a UK all-comers' record (best performance on country's soil) of 29:59.03 to win the women's race. She became the 12th woman in history to break the 30-minute barrier, moving up to 11th place on the world all-time list.

== Personal bests ==
- 3000 metres indoor – 8:31.20 (Birmingham 2023)
- 5000 metres – 14:46.20 (Hengelo 2021)
- 10,000 metres – 29:59.03 (London 2023) 11th woman of all time
