= Birmingham Indoor Grand Prix =

Annual indoor track and field competition

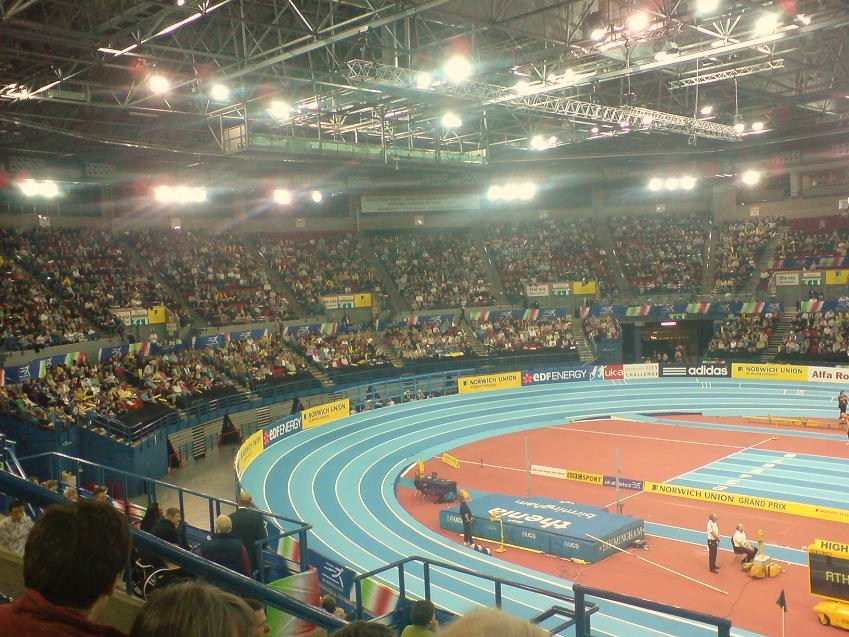
- The NIA Arena hosts the meeting
- Date: Mid-February
- Location: Birmingham, United Kingdom
- Event type: Athletics
- Established: 2006
- Last held: 2023 Birmingham Indoor Grand Prix
- Website: UKA page

The Birmingham Indoor Grand Prix, formerly known as Aviva Indoor Grand Prix, is an annual indoor athletics competition which was last held in mid-February 2023 at the Arena Birmingham in Birmingham, England. It is one of a handful of events to hold IAAF Indoor Permit Meetings status. As one of the later major meetings of the indoor athletics season, it often serves as preparation for the biennial European Athletics Indoor Championships and IAAF World Indoor Championships. The meeting is directed by former athlete Ian Stewart and attracts numerous high calibre athletes including World and Olympic medallists.

The event is one of three indoor athletics competitions in the United Kingdom which are sponsored by Müller, alongside the Müller Birmingham Grand Prix and the Müller Anniversary Games in London. The Müller Indoor Grand Prix was previously known as the Norwich Union Indoor Grand Prix prior to the sponsor's rebranding as Aviva in 2009.

In 2016 the meeting was staged at the Emirates Arena under new sponsorship (Sainsbury's) in Glasgow instead of Birmingham. The 2016 edition was part of the inaugural IAAF World Indoor Tour. The 2017 edition moved back to Birmingham, and venue will alternate in future years.

The Indoor Grand Prix venue has also been used for international level competitions, hosting the 2003 IAAF World Indoor Championships and the 2007 European Athletics Indoor Championships.

== World records ==
Over the course of its history, five world records and three world bests have been set at the Birmingham Indoor Grand Prix.

World records & bests set at the Birmingham Indoor Grand Prix
Year	Event	Record	Athlete	Nationality
2000	1000 m	2:14.96	Wilson Kipketer	Denmark
2001	3000 m	8:32.88	Gabriela Szabo	Romania
2004	5000 m	12:49.60	Kenenisa Bekele	Ethiopia
2007	2000 m	4:49.99	Kenenisa Bekele	Ethiopia
2008	Two miles	8:04.35 ^{[WB]}	Kenenisa Bekele	Ethiopia
2014	Two miles	9:00.48 ^{[WB]}	Genzebe Dibaba	Ethiopia
2015	Two miles	8:03.40 ^{[WB]}	Mo Farah	United Kingdom
2019	1500 m	3:31.04	Samuel Tefera	Ethiopia

== Meeting records ==
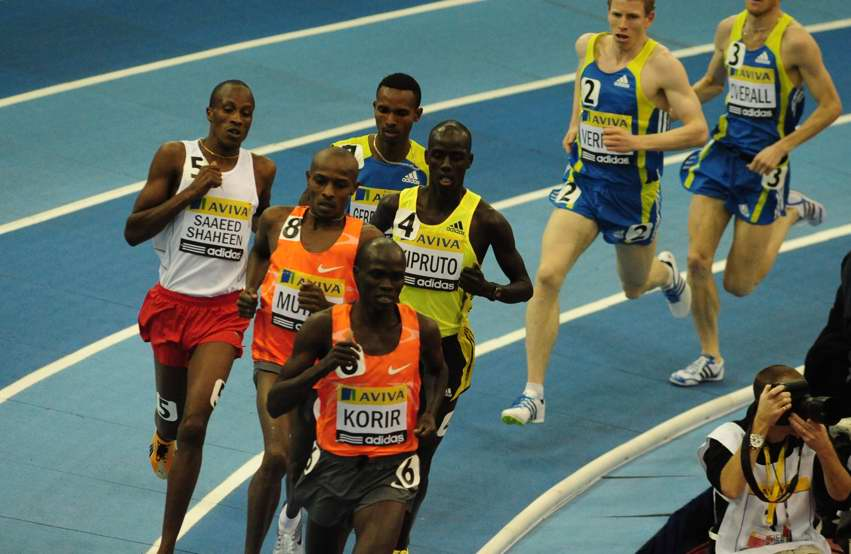
The men's 3000 metres race at the 2010 edition

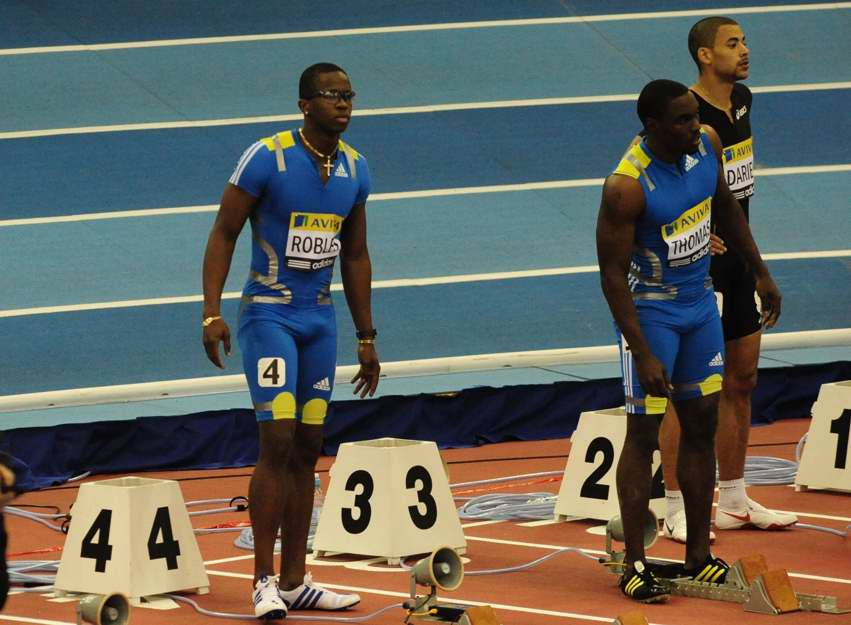
Dayron Robles, 2008 Olympic champion, lining up for the 60 metres hurdles

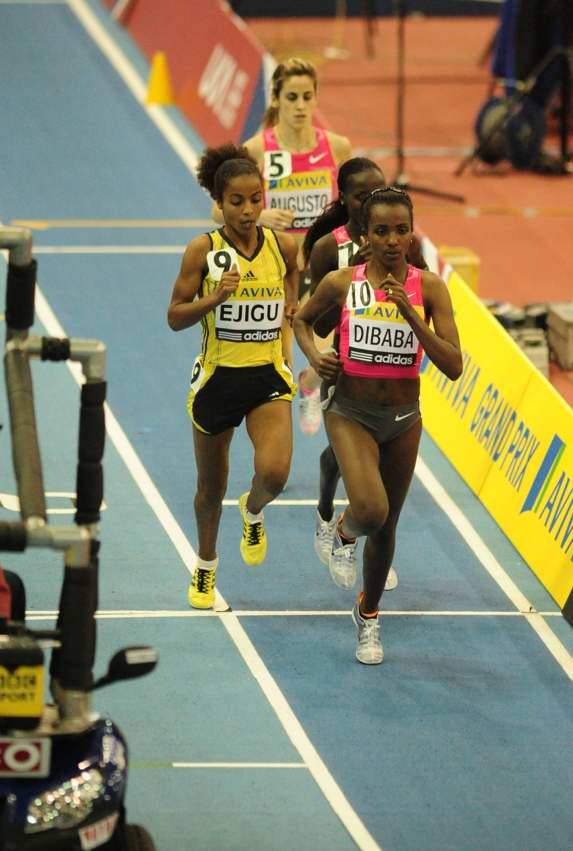
Tirunesh Dibaba competing against Sentayehu Ejigu in Birmingham

=== Men ===
Men's meeting records of the Birmingham Indoor Grand Prix
Event	Record	Athlete	Nationality	Date	Ref.	Video
60 m	6.47	Lerone Clarke	Jamaica	18 February 2012		
60 m	6.47	Su Bingtian	China	16 February 2019		
200 m	20.30	Shawn Crawford	United States	17 February 2002		
400 m	45.14	Michael Johnson	United States	20 February 1993		
800 m	1:44.52	Mohamed Aman	Ethiopia	15 February 2014		
1000 m	2:14.96	Wilson Kipketer	Denmark	20 February 2000		
1500 m	3:31.04 WR	Samuel Tefera	Ethiopia	16 February 2019		
2000 m	4:49.99 WR	Kenenisa Bekele	Ethiopia	17 February 2007		
3000 m	7:32.43	Bernard Lagat	United States	17 February 2007		
Two miles	8:03.40 ^{[WB]}	Mo Farah	Great Britain	21 February 2015		
5000 m	12:49.60 WR	Kenenisa Bekele	Ethiopia	20 February 2004		
60 m hurdles	7.35	Grant Holloway	United States	25 February 2023		
400 m hurdles	49.76	Felix Sanchez	Dominican Republic	19 February 2011		
High jump	2.40 m	Javier Sotomayor	Cuba	26 February 1994		
Pole vault	6.05 m	Armand Duplantis	Sweden	19 February 2022		
Long jump	8.31 m	Irving Saladino	Panama	17 February 2007		
Triple jump	17.57 m	Phillips Idowu	Great Britain	19 February 2011		
Shot put	21.12 m	Reese Hoffa	United States	17 February 2007		

=== Women ===
Women's meeting records of the Birmingham Indoor Grand Prix
Event	Record	Athlete	Nationality	Date	Ref.
60 m	6.98	Elaine Thompson	Jamaica	18 February 2017	
200 m	22.38	Veronica Campbell	Jamaica	18 February 2005	
400 m	50.60	Nicola Sanders	Great Britain	17 February 2007	
800 m	1:57.18	Keely Hodgkinson	Great Britain	25 February 2023	
1000 m	2:31.93 AR	Laura Muir	Great Britain	18 February 2017	
1500 m	4:00.83	Genzebe Dibaba	Ethiopia	16 February 2013	
Mile	4:18.75	Laura Muir	Great Britain	16 February 2019	
3000 m	8:16.69	Gudaf Tsegay	Ethiopia	25 February 2023	
Two miles	9:00.48 ^{[WB]}	Genzebe Dibaba	Ethiopia	15 February 2014	
60 m hurdles	7.75	Susanna Kallur	Sweden	18 February 2008	
High jump	1.97 m	Eleanor Patterson	Australia	19 February 2022	
Pole vault	4.88 m	Yelena Isinbayeva	Russia	18 February 2005	
Long jump	6.93 m	Katarina Johnson-Thompson	Great Britain	21 February 2015	
Shot put	18.97 m	Anita Márton	Hungary	18 February 2017	
