= Medina Eisa =

Ethiopian track and field athlete

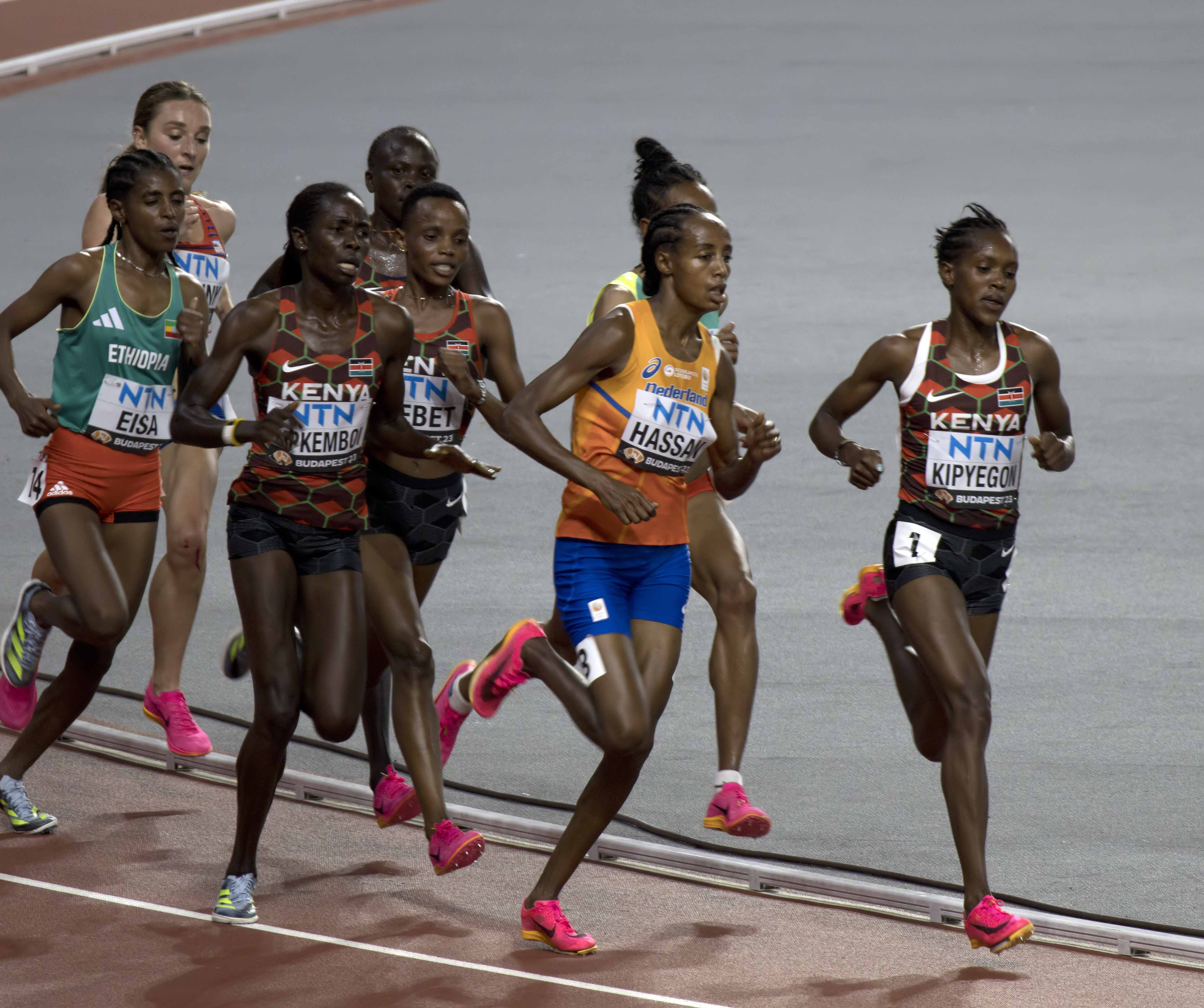
- Eisa at the 2023 World Championships

Personal information
- Full name: Medina Eisa Kumanda
- Born: 17 October 2002 (age 24) Debre Markos, Amhara Region, Ethiopia

Sport
- Sport: Athletics
- Event: Long-distance running
Medal record
Women's athletics
Representing Ethiopia
African Games
Gold medal – first place	2023 Accra	5000 m

Medina Eisa Kumanda (born 17 October 2002) is an Ethiopian long-distance runner. She won the gold medal over 5000 metres at the 2023 African Games.

Initially thought to have been born on 3 January 2005, she won the gold medal in the 5000 metres at the 2022 and 2024 World Under-20 Championships and silver in the junior women's race at the 2023 World Cross Country Championships. Nevertheless, World Athletics determined in 2026 that she was actually born on 17 October 2002 and retroactively nullified her under-20 records.

== Biography ==
In June 2021, Medina Eisa placed tenth in the 5000 metres race at the Ethiopian Olympic trials ahead of the delayed 2020 Summer Olympics in Tokyo.

In April 2022, she finished fourth in the event at the Ethiopian Athletics Championships held in Hawassa, running a time of 15:50.3. She claimed the gold medal for the women's 5000 m at the World Under-20 Championships in Cali, Colombia in August, clocking 15:29.71 ahead of compatriot Melknat Wudu and third-placed Uganda's Prisca Chesang. In October, Eisa won the Northern Ireland International Cross Country 6 km race held in Dundoland, Belfast in a time of 21:07.

=== 2023 ===
In February 2023, she earned the silver medal in the junior women's race at the World Cross Country Championships, running 21:00 to finish seven seconds behind compatriot Senayet Getachew. With the one-two Ethiopia took gold in the team standings. In April, she set a world U20 best in the 5 kilometres road race with a time of 14:46 for a win at the Adizero Road to Records event in Herzogenaurach, Germany. She beat her compatriot Senbere Teferi, women's only race world record-holder, in a photo finish.

In July 2023, Eisa competed at the Diamond League event in London and ran 5000 m in 14:16.54 to better the world U20 record of 14:30.88, held by Tirunesh Dibaba, but the record was not ratified as no anti-doping test was taken after the event. In August, she placed sixth over 5000 metres at the 2023 World Athletics Championships in Budapest. In December 2023, she won the 15 kilometres road race Montferland Run held in 's-Heerenberg with a time of 47:40.

=== 2024 ===
In February 2024, she set a new 3000 metres personal best time of 8:32.35 in Boston at the 2024 New Balance Indoor Grand Prix. She won the 2024 Millrose Games two miles in 9:04.39, the second-fastest short track time ever, but was later disqualified for cutting inside her staggered lane immediately after the race started, and thus not running the full distance.

In March 2024, she won gold in the 5000 metres at the African Games. In May 2024, she finished third in the 5000 metres at the 2024 Doha Diamond League. She won the 5000 metres at the 2024 Meeting International Mohammed VI d'Athlétisme in Rabat.

She competed in the 5000 metres at the 2024 Summer Olympics in Paris in August 2024, placing seventh in the final. Later that month, she retained her 5000m title at the 2024 World Athletics U20 Championships in Lima, Peru. She was runner-up to Beatrice Chebet at the Barcelona 5 km road race on 31 December 2024.

=== 2025 ===
She ran 14:25.92 to finish runner-up in the women's 5000 metres race at the Grand Slam Track event in Miami on 2 May 2025, in a sprint finish with race winner Agnes Jebet Ngetich. She then also finished runner-up in the 3000 metres race at the event, in 8:23.08. She won the 10 km race at the Great Manchester Run in England on 18 May 2025. That month, she was named as a challenger again for the long distance category at the 2025 Grand Slam Track event in Philadelphia. She placed sixth over 5000 metres at the 2025 Prefontaine Classic on 5 July and won the 5000 metres at the London Athletics Meet on 19 July.

In September 2025, she was a finalist over 5000 metres at the World Championships in Tokyo, Japan. In October, she won the tRUNsylvania 10K – a World Athletics Elite Label road race in Brasov, finishing ahead of Kenyan Brenda Jepchumba Kenei.

=== 2026 ===
On 4 June, Eisa placed fifth in the 5000 metres at the Golden Gala in Rome, part of the 2026 Diamond League. On 19 June, she ran 14:53.91 to win ahead of Likina Amebaw in the 5000 metres at the Doha Diamond League. At the Diamond League Final in Brussels in September, she placed eighth in the 5000 metres.

== Statistics ==
=== Circuit performances ===
Grand Slam Track results
Slam	Race group	Event	Pl.	Time	Prize money
2025 Miami Slam	Long distance	5000 m	2nd	14:25.92	US$30,000
2025 Miami Slam	Long distance	3000 m	2nd	8:23.08	US$30,000
2025 Philadelphia Slam	Long distance	3000 m	6th	8:48.26	US$7,500

=== Personal bests ===
- 3000 metres – 8:32.25 (Boston 2024)
- 5000 metres – 14:16.54 (London 2023)

Road

- 5 kilometres – 14:46 (Herzogenaurach 2023) WU20B
- 15 kilometres – 47.40 ('s-Heerenberg 2023)
- 5 kilometres U18 – 14:53 (Herzogenaurach 2022) AU18B
