= Teresia Muthoni Gateri =

Kenyan long-distance runner (born 2002)

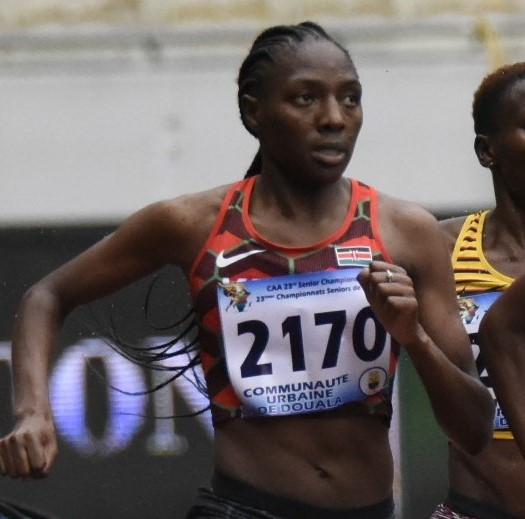
- 2024 African championships in Athletics

Personal information
- National team: Kenyan
- Born: 5 January 2002 (age 24)

Sport
- Country: Kenya
- Sport: Athletics
- Event: 3000 metres

Achievements and titles
- Personal bests: 1500 m : 4:02.54 (2024); 3000 m : 8:29.48 (2023); 5000 m : 14:44.89 (2022)
Medal record
World U20 Championships
Gold medal – first place	2021 Nairobi	3000 m

Teresia Muthoni Gateri (born 5 January 2002) is a Kenyan long-distance runner who specializes in the 3000 metres. She was the gold medallist at the World Athletics U20 Championships in 2021.
