= Melknat Wudu =

Ethiopian track and field athlete

Personal information
- Full name: Melknat Wudu Shaarew
- Nationality: Ethiopian
- Born: 3 January 2005 (age 21)

Sport
- Sport: Athletics
- Event: Long-distance running

Achievements and titles
- Personal bests: 3000m: 8:32.34 (Boston, 2024); 5000m: 14:39.36 (London, 2023)
Medal record
Women's athletics
Representing Ethiopia
African Games
| Bronze medal – third place | 2023 Accra | 5000 m |

Melknat Wudu Shaarew (born 3 January 2005) is an Ethiopian long-distance and cross country runner. She won the bronze medal over 5000 metres at the 2023 African Games.

In February 2024, she set a new world U20 3000 metres indoor record. However, this was not ratified by World Athletics amid uncertainty over her age.

== Career ==
=== 2021 ===
Melknat claimed the silver for the women's 5000 m at the 2021 World Under-20 Championships in Nairobi. She also won the bronze medal in the 3000 m in the same competition.

=== 2022 ===
At the 2022 World Under-20 Championships in Cali, Colombia, she won silver in the 5000m for the second consecutive year. In 2022, she also finished fourth in the 5000m at the 2022 African Championships held in Saint Pierre, Mauritius. In October 2022, she won silver at the Northern Ireland International Cross Country 6 km race held in Dundoland, Belfast.

=== 2023 ===
In February 2023, she competed in the junior women's race at the World Cross Country Championships, and her Ethiopian team took gold in the team standings. She finished seventh in the 5000m at the Diamond League event in Stockholm. In July 2023, competing at the Diamond League event in London, she set a new 5000m personal best time of 14:39.36. In December 2023, she finished fifth in the 15 kilometres road race Montferland Run in 's-Heerenberg with a time of 49:22.

=== 2024 ===
In February 2024 in Boston, Massachusetts, she ran a new personal best over 3000 metres, running 8:32.34. On 11 February 2024, at the Millrose Games recorded the fourth fastest time in history over two miles, running 9:07.12.

In March 2024, she won the bronze medal in the 5000 metres at the African Games. She finished fourth in the 5000 metres at the 2024 Diamond League event 2024 Meeting International Mohammed VI d'Athlétisme in Rabat.

=== 2025-present ===
In January 2025, she was runner-up to Beatrice Chebet at the Cross Internacional Juan Muguerza in Elgoibar. In August 2025, she won the Falmouth Road Race in Falmouth, Massachusetts.

On 13 September, Wudu placed third in 69:37 at the Great North Run in England.
