= Athletics at the 2022 Commonwealth Games – Women's 200 metres =

Sporting event

Women's 200 metres at the 2022 Commonwealth Games
- Venue: Alexander Stadium
- Dates: 4 August (first round); 5 August (semifinals); 6 August (final)
- Competitors: 36 from 28 nations
- Winning time: 22.02

Medalists
gold medal	Elaine Thompson-Herah	Jamaica
silver medal	Favour Ofili	Nigeria
bronze medal	Christine Mboma	Namibia

The women's 200 metres at the 2022 Commonwealth Games, as part of the athletics programme, took place in the Alexander Stadium in Birmingham on 4-6 August 2022.

The winning margin was 0.49 seconds which as of 2024 remains the only time the women's 200 metres was won by more than 0.4 seconds at these games since the introduction of fully automatic timing.

== Records ==
Prior to this competition, the existing world and Games records were as follows:

World record	Florence Griffith Joyner (USA)	21.34	Seoul, South Korea	29 September 1988
Commonwealth record	Shericka Jackson (JAM)	21.45	Eugene, United States	21 July 2022
Games record	Shaunae Miller-Uibo (BAH)	22.09	Gold Coast, Australia	12 April 2018

== Schedule ==
The schedule was as follows:

Date	Time	Round
Thursday 4 August 2022	10:25	First round
Friday 5 August 2022	20:15	First round
Saturday 6 August 2022	21:44	Final

All times are British Summer Time (UTC+1)

== Results ==
=== First round ===
First 3 in each heat (Q) and the next 6 fastest (q) advance to the Semifinals.

Wind:

Heat 1: 0.0 m/s, Heat 2: –0.1 m/s, Heat 3: +0.7 m/s, Heat 4: +1.3 m/s, Heat 5: +2.9 m/s, Heat 6: +2.7 m/s

Rank	Heat	Lane	Name	Nation	Result	Notes
1	4	3	Favour Ofili	Nigeria	22.71	Q
2	5	2	Elaine Thompson-Herah	Jamaica	22.80	Q
3	4	8	Gina Bass	The Gambia	22.87	Q
4	5	4	Beth Dobbin	Scotland	23.10	Q
5	5	6	Jacinta Beecher	Australia	23.13	Q
6	1	5	Christine Mboma	Namibia	23.20	Q
7	4	6	Asimenye Simwaka	Malawi	23.28	Q, PB
8	2	5	Hima Das	India	23.42	Q
9	6	5	Natassha McDonald	Canada	23.45	Q
10	4	7	Shanti Pereira	Singapore	23.46	q, PB
11	1	3	Ella Connolly	Australia	23.56	Q
12	3	2	Natalliah Whyte	Jamaica	23.61	Q
13	5	5	Mauricia Prieto	Trinidad and Tobago	23.69	q
14	2	4	Rhoda Njobvu	Zambia	23.85	Q
15	6	4	Beyoncé Defreitas	British Virgin Islands	23.99	Q
16	1	4	Millicent Ndoro	Kenya	24.03	Q
17	3	8	Hannah Brier	Wales	24.04	Q
18	2	8	Jacent Nyamahunge	Uganda	24.07	Q
19	1	2	Wurrie Njadoe	The Gambia	24.12	q
20	4	4	Kenisha Phillips	Guyana	24.13	q
21	4	5	Linda Angounou	Cameroon	24.14	q, SB
22	6	3	Toea Wisil	Papua New Guinea	24.42	Q
23	6	7	Charlotte Wingfield	Malta	24.47 (.461)	q
24	3	4	Abi Galpin	Guernsey	24.47 (.466)	Q
25	5	3	Denisha Cartwright	Bahamas	24.49	
26	6	2	Winifrida Makenji	Tanzania	24.74	
27	6	6	Kadiatu Kanu	Sierra Leone	24.76	
28	5	7	Isila Apkup	Papua New Guinea	24.97	
29	1	8	Hafsatu Kamara	Sierra Leone	25.05	
30	2	3	Leonie Beu	Papua New Guinea	25.29	
31	3	6	Bongiwe Mahlalela	Eswatini	25.31	
32	6	8	Nzubechi Grace Nwokocha	Nigeria	25.34	
33	3	7	Ancha Mandlate	Mozambique	25.43	PB
34	1	7	Chloe David	Vanuatu	26.75	
35	5	8	Aminath Mohamed	Maldives	26.79	
36	2	7	Rifa Mohamed	Maldives	26.87	PB
	6	9	Julien Alfred	Saint Lucia	DNS	
	3	3	Tynia Gaither	Bahamas	DNS	
	3	5	Maximila Imali	Kenya	DNS	
	2	6	Joella Lloyd	Antigua and Barbuda	DNS	
	1	6	Zoe Sherar	Canada	DNS	

=== Semifinals ===
First 2 in each heat (Q) and the next 2 fastest (q) advance to the Final.

Wind:

Heat 1: +1.9 m/s, Heat 2: 0.0 m/s, Heat 3: +1.5 m/s

Rank	Heat	Lane	Name	Nation	Result	Notes
1	3	5	Elaine Thompson-Herah	Jamaica	22.63	Q
2	1	5	Favour Ofili	Nigeria	22.66	Q
3	2	6	Christine Mboma	Namibia	22.93	Q
4	1	6	Natalliah Whyte	Jamaica	23.09	Q
5	1	4	Gina Bass	The Gambia	23.10	q
6	3	7	Natassha McDonald	Canada	23.21	Q, SB
7	3	4	Beth Dobbin	Scotland	23.28	q
8	1	9	Jacinta Beecher	Australia	23.40	
9	2	4	Ella Connolly	Australia	23.41	Q
10	2	7	Hima Das	India	23.42	
11	1	2	Shanti Pereira	Singapore	23.46	=PB
12	3	2	Mauricia Prieto	Trinidad and Tobago	23.58	
13	3	8	Asimenye Simwaka	Malawi	23.59	
14	2	5	Rhoda Njobvu	Zambia	23.72	
15	3	6	Beyoncé Defreitas	British Virgin Islands	23.81	
16	1	7	Hannah Brier	Wales	23.84	
17	2	9	Jacent Nyamahunge	Uganda	23.86	
18	2	8	Millicent Ndoro	Kenya	23.87	
19	2	2	Wurrie Njadoe	The Gambia	23.95	
20	1	8	Abi Galpin	Guernsey	24.10	
21	3	3	Linda Angounou	Cameroon	24.32	
22	2	3	Kenisha Phillips	Guyana	24.35	
23	3	9	Toea Wisil	Papua New Guinea	24.43	
24	1	3	Charlotte Wingfield	Malta	24.52	

=== Final ===
The medals were determined in the final.

Wind: +0.6m/s

Rank	Lane	Name	Result	Notes
1st place, gold medalist(s)	7	Elaine Thompson-Herah (JAM)	22.02	GR
2nd place, silver medalist(s)	6	Favour Ofili (NGR)	22.51	
3rd place, bronze medalist(s)	4	Christine Mboma (NAM)	22.80	
4	5	Natalliah Whyte (JAM)	23.06	
5	2	Gina Bass (GAM)	23.13	
6	8	Ella Connolly (AUS)	23.21 (.204)	
7	9	Natassha McDonald (CAN)	23.21 (.205)	=SB
8	3	Beth Dobbin (SCO)	23.40	
