= Athletics at the 2022 Commonwealth Games – Women's 100 metres =

Women's 100 metres at the 2022 Commonwealth Games
- Venue: Alexander Stadium
- Dates: 2 August (first round); 3 August (semifinals); 3 August (final)
- Competitors: 49
- Winning time: 10.95

Medalists
gold medal	Elaine Thompson-Herah	Jamaica
silver medal	Julien Alfred	Saint Lucia
bronze medal	Daryll Neita	England

The women's 100 metres at the 2022 Commonwealth Games, as part of the athletics programme, was held at Alexander Stadium on 2 and 3 August 2022.

The original fifth placed finisher in the final, Nzubechi Grace Nwokocha, was provisionally suspended for doping in September 2022 and subsequently disqualified by the Commonwealth Games Federation.

== Records ==
Prior to this competition, the existing world and Games records were as follows:

World record	Florence Griffith Joyner (USA)	10.49	Indianapolis, United States	16 July 1988
Commonwealth record	Elaine Thompson-Herah (JAM)	10.54	Eugene, United States	21 August 2021
Games record	Blessing Okagbare (NGR)	10.85	Glasgow, Scotland	28 July 2014

== Schedule ==
The schedule was as follows:

Date	Time	Round
Tuesday 2 August 2022	12:15	First round
Wednesday 3 August 2022	19:35	Semifinals
Wednesday 3 August 2022	20:05	Final

All times are British Summer Time (UTC+1)

== Results ==
=== First round ===
The first round consisted of seven heats. The three fastest competitors per heat (plus three fastest non-automatic qualifiers) advanced to the semifinals.

==== Heat 1 ====
Rank	Lane	Athlete	Nation	Result	Notes
1	1	Zoe Hobbs	New Zealand	11.09	Q
2	8	Asha Philip	England	11.27	Q
3	7	Alisha Rees	Scotland	11.36	q
4	6	Veronica Shanti Pereira	Singapore	11.48	q, NR
5	2	Bongiwe Mahlalela	Eswatini	12.05	
6	5	Aishath Himna Hassan	Maldives	12.17	NR
―	4	Winifrida Makenji	Tanzania	DQ	
DQ	8	Nzubechi Grace Nwokocha	Nigeria	~~10.99~~	
				Wind: +1.4 m/s	

==== Heat 2 ====
Rank	Lane	Athlete	Nation	Result	Notes
1	7	Elaine Thompson-Herah	Jamaica	10.99	Q
2	4	Imani-Lara Lansiquot	England	11.15	Q
3	6	Maximila Imali	Kenya	11.30	Q
4	8	Wurrie Njadoe	The Gambia	11.50	
5	2	Amya Clarke	Saint Kitts and Nevis	11.97	
6	3	Hilary Gladden	Belize	12.72	
7	5	Wena Gobure	Nauru	13.21	
				Wind: +0.6 m/s	

==== Heat 3 ====
Rank	Lane	Athlete	Nation	Result	Notes
1	2	Daryll Neita	England	11.02	Q
2	7	Bree Masters	Australia	11.41	Q
3	4	Joella Lloyd	Antigua and Barbuda	11.42	Q
4	3	Khalifa St. Fort	Trinidad and Tobago	11.49	
5	6	Milicent Ndoro	Kenya	11.76	
6	8	Tri-Tania Lowe	Anguilla	12.11	
7	5	Sumaya Dewan	Bangladesh	12.42	
				Wind: -0.2 m/s	

==== Heat 4 ====
Rank	Lane	Athlete	Nation	Result	Notes
1	2	Rosemary Chukwuma	Nigeria	11.02	Q
2	5	Oarabile Tshosa	Botswana	11.40	Q
3	3	Jasmine Abrams	Guyana	11.41	Q
4	4	Hannah Brier	Wales	11.48	q
5	6	Toea Wisil	Papua New Guinea	11.79	
6	7	Carla Scicluna	Malta	11.89	
7	8	Mariyam Alhaa Hussain	Maldives	12.86	
8	1	Aneela Gulzar	Pakistan	14.01	
				Wind: -0.2 m/s	

==== Heat 5 ====
Rank	Lane	Athlete	Nation	Result	Notes
1	3	Michelle-Lee Ahye	Trinidad and Tobago	11.14	Q
2	7	Tynia Gaither	Bahamas	11.19	Q
3	4	Joy Chinenye Udo Gabriel	Nigeria	11.43	Q
4	2	Dutee Chand	India	11.55	
5	6	Rhoda Njobvu	Zambia	11.57	
6	5	Ancha Ernesto Mandalate	Mozambique	12.14	
7	8	Kugapriya Chandran	Singapore	12.34	
				Wind: +0.1 m/s	

==== Heat 6 ====
Rank	Lane	Athlete	Nation	Result	Notes
1	2	Natalliah Whyte	Jamaica	11.31	Q
2	5	Naa Anang	Australia	11.37	Q
3	7	Jacent Nyamahunge	Uganda	11.53	Q
4	3	Hafsatu Kamara	Sierra Leone	11.80	
5	4	Bernice Yee Ling Liew	Singapore	12.12	
6	6	Mariyam Ru Ya Ali	Maldives	12.80	
				Wind: 0.0 m/s	

==== Heat 7 ====
Rank	Lane	Athlete	Nation	Result	Notes
1	5	Julien Alfred	Saint Lucia	11.24	Q
2	7	Remona Burchell	Jamaica	11.46	Q
3	6	Tsaone Bakani Sebele	Botswana	11.52	Q
4	2	Denisha Cartwright	Bahamas	11.85	
5	8	Jenifer Fatmata Bangura	Sierra Leone	12.00	
6	3	Chloe David	Vanuatu	12.60	
―	4	Leah Bertrand	Trinidad and Tobago	DNS	
				Wind: +0.7 m/s	

=== Semifinals ===
Three semi-finals were held. The two fastest competitors per semi (plus two fastest non-automatic qualifiers) advanced to the final.

==== Semifinal 1 ====
Rank	Lane	Athlete	Nation	Result	Notes
1	3	Julien Alfred	Saint Lucia	11.04	Q
2	5	Imani-Lara Lansiquot	England	11.18	
3	8	Remona Burchell	Jamaica	11.48	
4	7	Joella Lloyd	Antigua and Barbuda	11.49	
5	4	Oarabile Tshosa	Botswana	11.53	
6	2	Veronica Shanti Pereira	Singapore	11.57	
7	1	Hannah Brier	Wales	11.61	
DQ	8	Nzubechi Grace Nwokocha	Nigeria	~~11.06~~	
				Wind: +0.3 m/s	

==== Semifinal 2 ====
Rank	Lane	Athlete	Nation	Result	Notes
1	4	Elaine Thompson-Herah	Jamaica	11.05	Q
2	6	Zoe Hobbs	New Zealand	11.15	Q
3	5	Michelle-Lee Ahye	Trinidad and Tobago	11.29	
4	8	Asha Philip	England	11.35	
5	3	Naa Anang	Australia	11.39	
6	1	Joy Chinenye Udo Gabriel	Nigeria	11.45	
7	7	Jasmine Abrams	Guyana	11.60	
8	2	Tsaone Bakani Sebele	Botswana	11.71	
				Wind: 0.0 m/s	

==== Semifinal 3 ====
Rank	Lane	Athlete	Nation	Result	Notes
1	3	Daryll Neita	England	10.90	Q, PB
2	6	Rosemary Chukwuma	Nigeria	11.05	Q
3	5	Tynia Gaither	Bahamas	11.17	q
4	4	Natalliah Whyte	Jamaica	11.17	q
5	7	Maximila Imali	Kenya	11.35	
6	8	Bree Masters	Australia	11.36	
7	1	Alisha Rees	Scotland	11.47	
8	2	Jacent Nyamahunge	Uganda	11.58	
				Wind: +1.1 m/s	

=== Final ===
Wednesday 3 August 2022 at ~20.05

Rank	Lane	Athlete	Nation	Result	Notes
1st place, gold medalist(s)	4	Elaine Thompson-Herah	Jamaica	10.95	
2nd place, silver medalist(s)	6	Julien Alfred	Saint Lucia	11.01	
3rd place, bronze medalist(s)	5	Daryll Neita	England	11.07	
4	3	Rosemary Chukwuma	Nigeria	11.17	
5	7	Zoe Hobbs	New Zealand	11.19	
6	2	Tynia Gaither	Bahamas	11.23	
7	1	Natalliah Whyte	Jamaica	11.32	
DQ	8	Nzubechi Grace Nwokocha	Nigeria	~~11.18~~	
				Wind: +0.4 m/s	
