= 2019 Athletissima =

- Dates: 4–5 July 2019
- Host city: Lausanne, Switzerland
- Venue: Stade Olympique de la Pontaise
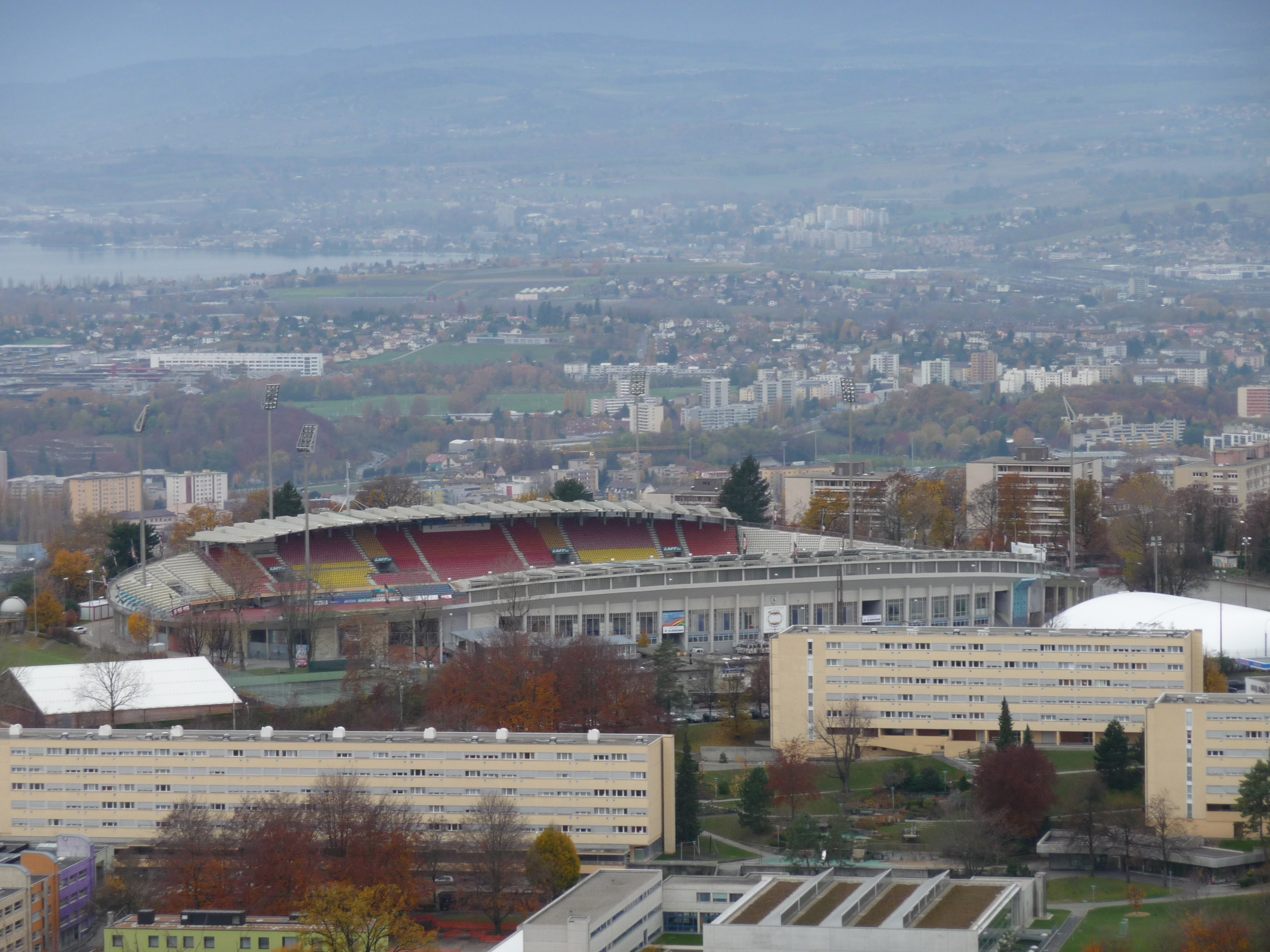
- Level: 2019 IAAF Diamond League
- Events: 28 (14 Diamond League)

The 2019 Athletissima was the 43rd edition of the annual outdoor track and field meeting in Lausanne, Switzerland. Held from 4–5 July primarily at the Stade Olympique de la Pontaise, it was the eighth leg of the 2019 IAAF Diamond League – the highest level international track and field circuit. The women's pole vault (the City Event) was held on 4 July at the esplanade of the Le Flon district, with the other events following the next day at the Stade Olympique. 28 events total were contested with 14 of them being point-scoring Diamond League disciplines.

The last race of the meet staged the eighth fastest men's 200 m performance in history by Noah Lyles, who broke Usain Bolt's meeting record with world-leading time of 19.50 seconds. That made him the fourth fastest man over 200 m in history, and the second fastest American ever after former world record holder Michael Johnson. Meeting records and world leads were also set in the men's 1500 m and pole vault events by Timothy Cheruiyot (3:28.77) and Piotr Lisek (6.01 m) respectively, the latter also a Polish record. Hagos Gebrhiwet notably finished and celebrated one lap early in the men's 5000 m, causing him to fall back to tenth place once he realized his mistake and to cede the race to Ethiopian teammate Yomif Kejelcha.

On the women's side, Shelly-Ann Fraser-Pryce finished the Diamond League 100 m with a time of 10.74 seconds, winning by a 0.17-second margin ahead of last year's joint-fastest women Dina Asher-Smith and Marie-Josée Ta Lou. It was Fraser-Pryce's 13th race under 10.80 seconds in her career and tied Marion Jones' record for the most races under the same time. In the Diamond League 400 m, Salwa Eid Naser almost handed Aminatou Seyni a win while relaxing in the home straight, but Naser was able to narrowly hold off Seyni (49.17 to 49.19) after Naser realized her mistake. Naser's time broke Marie-José Pérec's 23-year-old meeting record of 49.45 seconds, and Seyni's new Nigerien record was the second fastest ever run by an African woman.

== Diamond League results ==
Athletes competing in the Diamond League disciplines earned extra compensation and points which went towards qualifying for one of two Diamond League finals (either Zürich or Brussels depending on the discipline). First place earned 8 points, with each step down in place earning one less point than the previous, until no points are awarded in 9th place or lower.

=== Men ===
200 m (−0.1 m/s)
Place	Athlete	Time	Points
1	Noah Lyles (USA)	19.50 WL MR PB	15 (+8)
2	Álex Quiñónez (ECU)	19.87 NR PB	31 (+7)
3	Andre De Grasse (CAN)	19.92	14 (+6)
4	Aaron Brown (CAN)	19.95 PB	19(+5)
5	Ramil Guliyev (TUR)	20.01	31 (+4)
6	Alex Wilson (SUI)	20.29	3 (+3)
7	Xie Zhenye (CHN)	20.32	2 (+2)
8	Sydney Siame (ZAM)	20.47	1 (+1)

800 m
Place	Athlete	Time	Points
1	Wycliffe Kinyamal (KEN)	1:43.78	12 (+8)
2	Ferguson Cheruiyot Rotich (KEN)	1:43.93	17 (+7)
3	Emmanuel Kipkurui Korir (KEN)	1:44.01	20 (+6)
4	Brandon McBride (CAN)	1:44.14	11 (+5)
5	Clayton Murphy (USA)	1:44.47	14 (+4)
6	Amel Tuka (BIH)	1:44.87	3 (+3)
7	Wesley Vázquez (PUR)	1:45.16	2 (+2)
8	Marcin Lewandowski (POL)	1:45.23	2 (+1)
9	Adam Kszczot (POL)	1:45.75	4
10	Guy Learmonth (GBR)	1:45.86	0
DNF (PM)	Harun Abda (USA)	Did not finish (pace maker)	0

1500 m
Place	Athlete	Time	Points
1	Timothy Cheruiyot (KEN)	3:28.77 WL MR	31 (+8)
2	Jakob Ingebrigtsen (NOR)	3:30.16 PB	21 (+7)
3	Ayanleh Souleiman (DJI)	3:30.79	26 (+6)
4	Filip Ingebrigtsen (NOR)	3:30.82	11 (+5)
5	Ronald Musagala (UGA)	3:31.33 NR PB	4 (+4)
6	Samuel Tefera (ETH)	3:31.39 PB	8 (+3)
7	Vincent Kibet (KEN)	3:33.79	14 (+2)
8	Adel Mechaal (ESP)	3:33.91 PB	1 (+1)
9	Jake Wightman (GBR)	3:34.40	0
10	Kevin López (ESP)	3:34.83 PB	0
11	Bethwell Birgen (KEN)	3:35.04	11
12	Aman Wote (ETH)	3:36.68	2
13	Justus Soget (KEN)	3:38.79	0
DNF	Ronald Kwemoi (KEN)	Did not finish	3
DNF (PM)	Boaz Kiprugut (KEN)	Did not finish (pace maker)	0
DNF (PM)	Timothy Sein (KEN)	Did not finish (pace maker)	0

5000 m
Place	Athlete	Time	Points
1	Yomif Kejelcha (ETH)	13:00.56	16 (+8)
2	Selemon Barega (ETH)	13:01.99	29 (+7)
3	Telahun Haile Bekele (ETH)	13:03.09	18 (+6)
4	Joshua Cheptegei (UGA)	13:03.59	14 (+5)
5	Abadi Hadis (ETH)	13:04.50	8 (+4)
6	Paul Chelimo (USA)	13:05.70	3 (+3)
7	Paul Kipngetich Tanui (KEN)	13:06.10	2 (+2)
8	Nicholas Kipkorir Kimeli (KEN)	13:07.35	10 (+1)
9	Davis Kiplangat (KEN)	13:08.09	0
10	Hagos Gebrhiwet (ETH)	13:09.59	12
11	Richard Yator (KEN)	13:09.79	0
12	Dawit Fikadu (BHR)	13:10.40 PB	0
13	Solomon Berihu (ETH)	13:11.70	0
14	Julien Wanders (SUI)	13:13.84 PB	0
15	Tsegay Kidanu (ETH)	13:14.68	0
16	Birhanu Balew (BHR)	13:17.82	14
17	Albert Rop (BHR)	13:18.25	0
18	Muktar Edris (ETH)	13:29.53	0
19	Aron Kifle (ERI)	13:36.42	0
20	Richard Ringer (GER)	13:44.58	0
DNF	Soufiyan Bouqantar (MAR)	Did not finish	0
DNF	Abdalaati Iguider (MAR)	Did not finish	0
DNF (PM)	Cornelius Kangogo (KEN)	Did not finish (pace maker)	0
DNF (PM)	Thierry Ndikumwenayo (BDI)	Did not finish (pace maker)	0
DNS	Getaneh Molla (ETH)	Did not start	0

110 m hurdles (+1.0 m/s)
Place	Athlete	Time	Points
1	Orlando Ortega (ESP)	13.05	21 (+8)
2	Daniel Roberts (USA)	13.11	7 (+7)
3	Ronald Levy (JAM)	13.25	11 (+6)
4	Andy Pozzi (GBR)	13.28	22 (+5)
5	Xie Wenjun (CHN)	13.29	14 (+4)
6	Pascal Martinot-Lagarde (FRA)	13.34	3 (+3)
7	Devon Allen (USA)	13.35	6 (+2)
8	Jason Joseph (SUI)	13.80	1 (+1)

Pole vault
Place	Athlete	Mark	Points
1	Piotr Lisek (POL)	6.01 m WL MR NR PB	33 (+8)
2	Sam Kendricks (USA)	5.95 m	38 (+7)
3	Mondo Duplantis (SWE)	5.81 m	19 (+6)
3	Renaud Lavillenie (FRA)	5.81 m	7 (+6)
5	Cole Walsh (USA)	5.71 m	14 (+4)
6	Paweł Wojciechowski (POL)	5.61 m	11 (+3)
7	Alioune Sene (FRA)	5.61 m	3 (+2)
8	Valentin Lavillenie (FRA)	5.51 m	4 (+1)
8	Bo Kanda Lita Baehre (GER)	5.51 m	3 (+1)
NM	Thiago Braz (BRA)	No mark	9

Long jump
Place	Athlete	Mark	Points
1	Juan Miguel Echevarría (CUB)	8.32 m (+0.5 m/s)	23 (+8)
2	Miltiadis Tentoglou (GRE)	8.19 m (+0.5 m/s)	14 (+7)
3	Luvo Manyonga (RSA)	8.13 m (+0.1 m/s)	18 (+6)
4	Tajay Gayle (JAM)	8.13 m (−0.9 m/s)	17 (+5)
5	Ruswahl Samaai (RSA)	8.08 m (+0.7 m/s)	16 (+4)
6	Darcy Roper (AUS)	8.05 m (+0.7 m/s)	3 (+3)
7	Will Claye (USA)	7.74 m (+0.6 m/s)	2 (+2)
8	Benjamin Gföhler (SUI)	7.68 m (+1.5 m/s)	1 (+1)

=== Women ===
100 m (+0.2 m/s)
Place	Athlete	Time	Points
1	Shelly-Ann Fraser-Pryce (JAM)	10.74	8 (+8)
2	Dina Asher-Smith (GBR)	10.91	14 (+7)
3	Marie-Josée Ta Lou (CIV)	10.93	18 (+6)
4	Dafne Schippers (NED)	11.04	9 (+5)
5	Kayla White (USA)	11.16 (.157)	4 (+4)
6	Gina Lückenkemper (GER)	11.16 (.158)	6 (+3)
7	Mujinga Kambundji (SUI)	11.27	2 (+2)
8	Salomé Kora (SUI)	11.29	1 (+1)

400 m
Place	Athlete	Time	Points
1	Salwa Eid Naser (BHR)	49.17 MR	32 (+8)
2	Aminatou Seyni (NIG)	49.19 NR PB	14 (+7)
3	Stephenie Ann McPherson (JAM)	50.88	17 (+6)
4	Laviai Nielsen (GBR)	51.31	5 (+5)
5	Christine Botlogetswe (BOT)	51.50	16 (+4)
6	Justyna Święty-Ersetic (POL)	51.73	9 (+3)
7	Courtney Okolo (USA)	51.85	3 (+2)
8	Shericka Jackson (JAM)	52.35	8 (+1)

400 m hurdles
Place	Athlete	Time	Points
1	Shamier Little (USA)	53.73	21 (+8)
2	Zuzana Hejnová (CZE)	54.11 (.101)	13 (+7)
3	Ashley Spencer (USA)	54.11 (.107)	13 (+6)
4	Janieve Russell (JAM)	55.13	14 (+5)
5	Léa Sprunger (SUI)	55.24	6 (+4)
6	Amalie Iuel (NOR)	55.48	7 (+3)
7	Kori Carter (USA)	55.55	12 (+2)
8	Cassandra Tate (USA)	56.90	1 (+1)

High jump
Place	Athlete	Mark	Points
1	Mariya Lasitskene (ANA)	2.02 m	32 (+8)
2	Karyna Taranda (BLR)	2.00 m =NR PB	12 (+7)
3	Mirela Demireva (BUL)	1.97 m	23 (+6)
4	Yuliya Levchenko (UKR)	1.94 m	20 (+5)
5	Kamila Lićwinko (POL)	1.94 m	4 (+4)
6	Iryna Gerashchenko (UKR)	1.94 m	7 (+3)
7	Erika Kinsey (SWE)	1.91 m	26 (+2)
7	Nicola McDermott (AUS)	1.91 m	5 (+2)
9	Salome Lang (SUI)	1.88 m	0

Triple jump
Place	Athlete	Mark	Points
1	Caterine Ibargüen (COL)	14.89 m (±0.0 m/s)	16 (+8)
2	Yulimar Rojas (VEN)	14.82 m (−0.6 m/s)	7 (+7)
3	Liadagmis Povea (CUB)	14.77 m (+0.9 m/s) PB	6 (+6)
4	Shanieka Ricketts (JAM)	14.65 m (+0.2 m/s)	11 (+5)
5	Kimberly Williams (JAM)	14.52 m (+0.6 m/s)	9 (+4)
6	Paraskevi Papachristou (GRE)	14.51 m (+1.0 m/s)	7 (+3)
7	Olha Saladukha (UKR)	14.49 m (+0.5 m/s)	5 (+2)
8	Olga Rypakova (KAZ)	14.35 m (−0.1 m/s)	1 +1)
9	Ana Peleteiro (ESP)	14.16 m (+0.3 m/s)	0
10	Patricia Mamona (POR)	13.94 m (−0.4 m/s)	2
11	Kristin Gierisch (GER)	13.88 m (+0.1 m/s)	1

Shot put
Place	Athlete	Mark	Points
1	Christina Schwanitz (GER)	19.04 m	16 (+8)
2	Brittany Crew (CAN)	18.46 m	7 (+7)
3	Fanny Roos (SWE)	18.41 m	14 (+6)
4	Danniel Thomas-Dodd (JAM)	18.36 m	21 (+5)
5	Aliona Dubitskaya (BLR)	18.27 m	18 (+4)
6	Chase Ealey (USA)	18.15 m	24 (+3)
7	Paulina Guba (POL)	17.67 m	4 (+2)
NM	Jessica Ramsey (USA)	No mark	7

Javelin throw
Place	Athlete	Mark	Points
1	Christin Hussong (GER)	66.59 m	18 (+8)
2	Kelsey-Lee Barber (AUS)	65.63 m PB	10 (+7)
3	Barbora Špotáková (CZE)	63.79 m	8 (+6)
4	Liu Shiying (CHN)	62.63 m	5 (+5)
5	Tatsiana Khaladovich (BLR)	62.07 m	5 (+4)
6	Līna Mūze (LAT)	60.18 m	16 (+3)
7	Annu Rani (IND)	59.35 m	2 (+2)
8	Elizabeth Gleadle (CAN)	58.76 m	1 (+1)
9	Kara Winger (USA)	56.99 m	5
10	Sara Kolak (CRO)	56.19 m	0
NM	Liina Laasma (EST)	No Mark	0
NM	Eda Tuğsuz (TUR)	No mark	7

== Non-Diamond League results ==
=== Men ===
Event	First		Second		Third	
100 m (+0.2 m/s)	Justin Gatlin (USA)	9.92	Mike Rodgers (USA)	10.01	Aaron Brown (CAN)	10.07
400 m	Terrence Agard (NED)	45.65	Liemarvin Bonevacia (NED)	45.69	Ricky Petrucciani (SUI)	46.64
800 m	Jonas Schöpper (SUI)	1:49.01	Pascal Furtwängler (SUI)	1:49.82	Joaquim Jaegar (SUI)	1:49.89
400 m hurdles	Luke Campbell (GER)	49.54 (.534)	Rasmus Mägi (EST)	49.54 (.536)	Mamadou Kassé Hann (FRA)	49.90
1500 m wheelchair	Marcel Hug (SUI)	3:04.78	Yassine Gharbi (TUN)	3:04.89	Alhassane Baldé (GER)	3:05.24

=== Women ===
Event	First		Second		Third	
100 m (+0.4 m/s)	Ge Manqi (CHN)	11.04 PB	Liang Xiaojing (CHN)	11.19 PB	Marije van Hunenstijn (NED)	11.28
200 m (+1.0 m/s)	Gabrielle Thomas (USA)	22.69	Jodie Williams (GBR)	22.75	Anthonique Strachan (BAH)	22.81
400 m	Yasmin Giger (SUI)	52.91 PB	Femke Bol (NED)	52.98	Rachel Pellaud (SUI)	54.06
800 m	Nelly Jepkosgei (KEN)	1:59.54	Halimah Nakaayi (UGA)	1:59.97	Gabriela Gajanová (SVK)	2:01.25
4×100 m relay	The Netherlands	42.33	China	42.50	Switzerland	42.60
Pole vault	Katie Nageotte (USA)	4.82 m PB	Anzhelika Sidorova (ANA)	4.72 m	Holly Bradshaw (GBR)	4.72 m

=== Swiss under-18 ===
Event	First		Second		Third	
1500 m boys	Abdi-Salam Ali	4:12.69	Colin Maneff	4:13.15	Antoine Tâche	4:13.62
1500 m girls	Lilly Nägeli	4:33.91	Juliette Morath	4:35.46	Shirley Lang	4:36.74

=== Swiss under-14 ===
Event	First		Second		Third	
5×80 m relay mixed	Lausanne-Sports	50.21	ST Bern	52.26	COA Valais Romand	52.43

== See also ==
- 2019 Weltklasse Zürich (first half of the Diamond League final)
- 2019 Memorial Van Damme (second half of the Diamond League final)
