= 2022 World Athletics Championships – Women's 200 metres =

Athletics event

Women's 200 metres at the 2022 World Championships
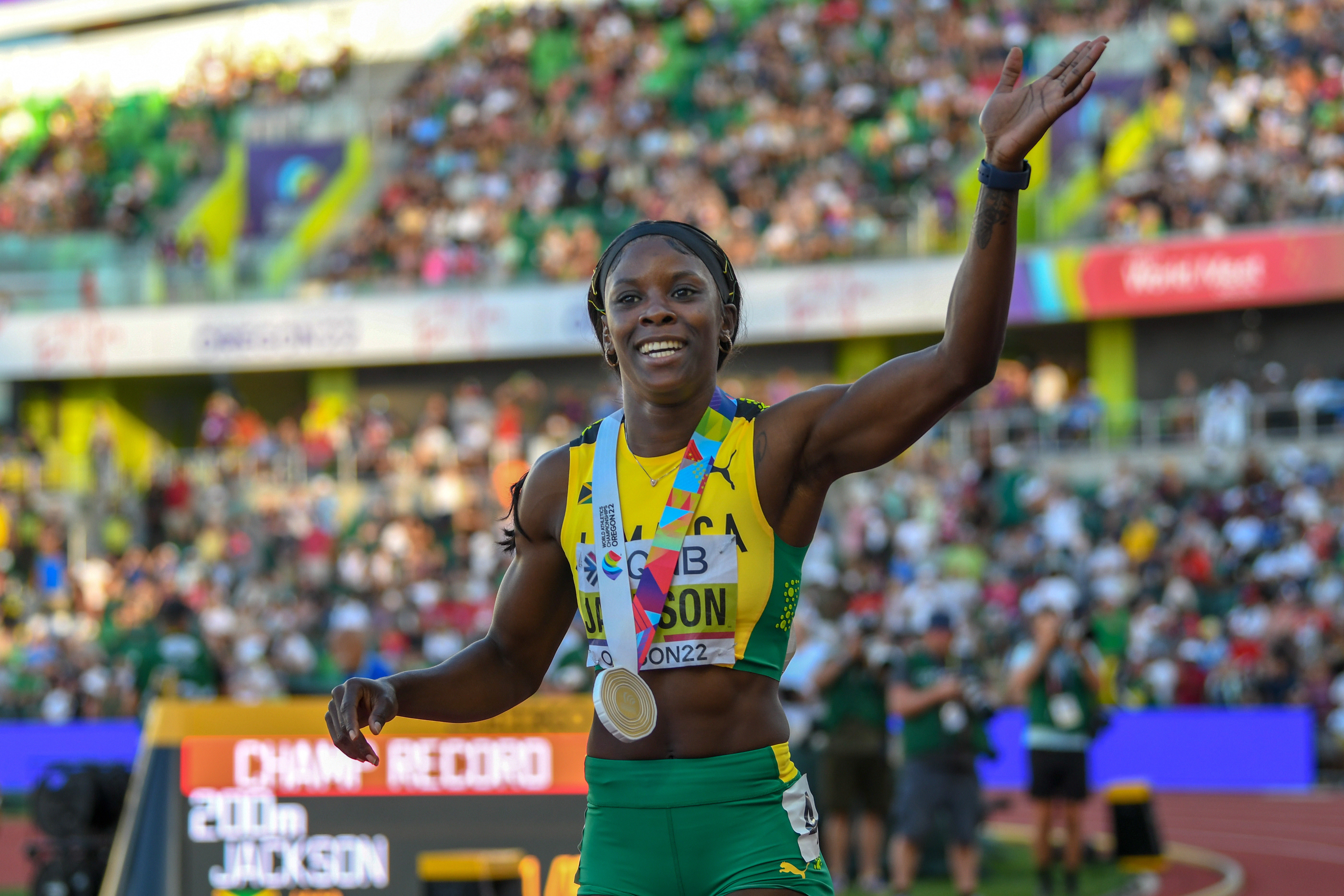
- Shericka Jackson shortly after winning the final.
- Venue: Hayward Field
- Dates: 18 July (heats); 19 July (semi-finals); 21 July (final)
- Competitors: 51 from 32 nations
- Winning time: 21.45 CR

Medalists
gold medal	Shericka Jackson	Jamaica
silver medal	Shelly-Ann Fraser-Pryce	Jamaica
bronze medal	Dina Asher-Smith	Great Britain

Video on YouTube Official Video

The women's 200 metres at the 2022 World Athletics Championships was held at the Hayward Field in Eugene, Oregon, U.S. from 18 to 21 July 2022.

== Summary ==
Coming into the championships, Shericka Jackson was the world leader at 21.55 from her Jamaican National Championships, making her the third fastest 200m runner ever. Lined up to her inside was #2, the Olympic Champion Elaine Thompson-Herah. Between them was the defending champion Dina Asher-Smith. And to their outside, separated by #3 semi-finalist Tamara Clark was 100 metre champion Shelly-Ann Fraser-Pryce who had set the Masters World Record in the semis. All 5 had run under 22 seconds just to get here.

Fraser-Pryce was first out of the blocks, which is her forté. Asher-Smith was not too far behind and Jackson did not lose too much relative to the stagger. Two thirds of the way through the turn, Fraser-Pryce had already passed Aminatou Seyni. Almost a metre behind at the 80 metre mark on the track, as they exited the turn Jackson accelerated to even up with Fraser-Pryce. From there she continued to pull away. Asher-Smith tried to make some ground on Fraser-Pryce but only maintained the gap at the first half of the straightaway before Fraser-Pryce pulled away to a clear second place, three metres behind Jackson. Asher-Smith's only challenge for bronze was a late run by Seyni, but she missed by a metre.

Jackson's 21.45 was the second fastest of all time, the Championship record, a .1 improvement over her Jamaican Championship time and only .11 shy of FloJo's enduring world record from 1988. Jackson also became the first person to win medals in all three sprinting events, a feat Fred Kerley was also attempting and failed to accomplish this year. In second, "Mommy Rocket" Fraser-Pryce's 21.81 took another .01 off the Masters record she had set the day earlier.

== Records ==
Before the competition records were as follows:

Record	Athlete & Nat.	Perf.	Location	Date
World record	Florence Griffith-Joyner (USA)	21.34	Seoul, South Korea	29 September 1988
Championship record	Dafne Schippers (NED)	21.63	Beijing, China	28 August 2015
World Leading	Shericka Jackson (JAM)	21.55	Kingston, Jamaica	26 June 2022
African Record	Christine Mboma (NAM)	21.78	Zürich, Switzerland	9 September 2021
Asian Record	Li Xuemei (CHN)	22.01	Shanghai, China	22 October 1997
North, Central American and Caribbean record	Florence Griffith-Joyner (USA)	21.34	Seoul, South Korea	29 September 1988
South American Record	Ana Claudia Lemos (BRA)	22.48	São Paulo, Brazil	6 August 2011
European Record	Dafne Schippers (NED)	21.63	Beijing, China	28 August 2015
Oceanian record	Melinda Gainsford (AUS)	22.23	Stuttgart, Germany	13 July 1997

== Qualification standard ==
The standard to qualify automatically for entry was 22.80.

== Schedule ==
The event schedule, in local time (UTC−7), was as follows:

Date	Time	Round
18 July	18:00	Heats
19 July	18:05	Semi-finals
21 July	19:35	Final

== Results ==
=== Heats ===
The first 3 athletes in each heat (Q) and the next 6 fastest (q) qualify for the semi-finals.

Wind:
Heat 1: +2.5 m/s, Heat 2: -0.2 m/s, Heat 3: +1.1 m/s, Heat 4: +0.4 m/s, Heat 5: +0.9 m/s, Heat 6: +1.9 m/s

Rank	Heat	Name	Nationality	Time	Notes
1	3	Aminatou Seyni	Niger	21.98	Q, NR
2	6	Favour Ofili	Nigeria	22.24	Q
3	5	Abby Steiner	United States	22.26	Q
4	3	Shelly-Ann Fraser-Pryce	Jamaica	22.26	Q
5	4	Tamara Clark	United States	22.27	Q
6	2	Beatrice Masilingi	Namibia	22.27	Q SB
7	1	Shericka Jackson	Jamaica	22.33	Q
8	5	Mujinga Kambundji	Switzerland	22.34	Q
9	6	Jenna Prandini	United States	22.38	Q
10	2	Elaine Thompson-Herah	Jamaica	22.41	Q
11	4	Dina Asher-Smith	Great Britain & N.I.	22.56	Q
12	1	Anahí Suárez	Ecuador	22.56	Q
13	4	Tynia Gaither	Bahamas	22.61	Q
14	5	Nzubechi Grace Nwokocha	Nigeria	22.61	Q
15	1	Dalia Kaddari	Italy	22.75	Q
16	4	Gina Bass	Gambia	22.78	q SB
17	3	Vitoria Cristina Rosa	Brazil	22.84	Q
18	2	Ida Karstoft	Denmark	22.85	Q
19	1	Jessica-Bianca Wessolly	Germany	22.87	q
20	4	Jessika Gbai	Ivory Coast	22.89	q
21	1	Rosemary Chukwuma	Nigeria	22.93	q
22	1	Edidiong Odiong	Bahrain	22.98	q
23	2	Joella Lloyd	Antigua and Barbuda	22.99	q
24	3	Beth Dobbin	Great Britain & N.I.	23.04	
25	5	Lauren Gale	Canada	23.08	
26	6	Jacinta Beecher	Australia	23.22	Q
27	6	Olivia Fotopoulou	Cyprus	23.25	
28	2	Sophia Junk	Germany	23.27	SB
29	5	Ella Connolly	Australia	23.27	
30	3	Imke Vervaet	Belgium	23.28	
31	5	Maboundou Koné	Ivory Coast	23.32	
32	6	Catherine Léger	Canada	23.35	
33	2	Lorène Bazolo	Portugal	23.41	
34	4	Ana Carolina Azevedo	Brazil	23.45	
35	6	Georgia Hulls	New Zealand	23.46	
36	4	Shirley Nekhubui	South Africa	23.46	
37	1	Olga Safronova	Kazakhstan	23.50	
38	2	Anniina Kortetmaa	Finland	23.51	
39	3	Veronica Shanti Pereira	Singapore	23.53	
40	3	Elisabeth Slettum	Norway	23.55	
41	2	Lorraine Martins	Brazil	23.60	
42	5	Beyoncé Defreitas	British Virgin Islands	23.81	
43	6	Hanna Barakat	Palestine	26.33	NR
44	6	Anthonique Strachan	Bahamas	1:50.06	
	3	Marie-Josée Ta Lou	Ivory Coast		DNS

=== Semi-finals ===
The first 2 athletes in each heat (Q) and the next 2 fastest (q) qualify for the final.

Wind:
Heat 1: +2.0 m/s, Heat 2: +1.4 m/s, Heat 3: -0.1 m/s

Rank	Heat	Name	Nationality	Time	Notes
1	1	Shericka Jackson	Jamaica	21.67	Q
2	3	Shelly-Ann Fraser-Pryce	Jamaica	21.82	Q, SB
3	2	Tamara Clark	United States	21.95	Q
4	2	Dina Asher-Smith	Great Britain & N.I.	21.96	Q, SB
5	2	Elaine Thompson-Herah	Jamaica	21.97	q, SB
6	1	Aminatou Seyni	Niger	22.04	Q
7	1	Mujinga Kambundji	Switzerland	22.05	q, NR
8	1	Jenna Prandini	United States	22.08	
9	3	Abby Steiner	United States	22.15	Q
10	3	Favour Ofili	Nigeria	22.30	
11	1	Tynia Gaither	Bahamas	22.41	PB
12	2	Vitoria Cristina Rosa	Brazil	22.47	AR
13	2	Nzubechi Grace Nwokocha	Nigeria	22.49	
14	1	Gina Bass	Gambia	22.71	SB
15	1	Rosemary Chukwuma	Nigeria	22.72	
16	3	Anahí Suárez	Ecuador	22.74	NR
17	3	Ida Karstoft	Denmark	22.84	
18	2	Jessika Gbai	Ivory Coast	22.84	
19	3	Dalia Kaddari	Italy	22.86	
20	1	Jacinta Beecher	Australia	23.14	
21	2	Edidiong Odiong	Bahrain	23.31	
22	3	Jessica-Bianca Wessolly	Germany	23.33	
23	3	Joella Lloyd	Antigua and Barbuda	23.38	
24	2	Beatrice Masilingi	Namibia	24.78	

=== Final ===
The final was started at 19:35 on 21 July. The results were as follows:

Wind: +0.6 m/s

Rank	Name	Nationality	Time	Notes
1st place, gold medalist(s)	Shericka Jackson	Jamaica	21.45	CR, NR
2nd place, silver medalist(s)	Shelly-Ann Fraser-Pryce	Jamaica	21.81	SB
3rd place, bronze medalist(s)	Dina Asher-Smith	Great Britain & N.I.	22.02	
4	Aminatou Seyni	Niger	22.12	
5	Abby Steiner	United States	22.26	
6	Tamara Clark	United States	22.32	
7	Elaine Thompson-Herah	Jamaica	22.39	
8	Mujinga Kambundji	Switzerland	22.55	
