= Athletics at the 2022 Commonwealth Games – Women's 4 × 100 metres relay =

Women's 4 × 100 metres relay at the 2022 Commonwealth Games
- Venue: Alexander Stadium
- Dates: 6 August (first round); 7 August (final)
- Competitors: 53 from 12 nations
- Winning time: 42.41

Medalists
| gold medal | Asha Philip; Imani-Lara Lansiquot; Bianca Williams; Daryll Neita; Ashleigh Nelson | England |
| silver medal | Kemba Nelson; Natalliah Whyte; Remona Burchell; Elaine Thompson-Herah; *Roneisha McGregor | Jamaica |
| bronze medal | Ella Connolly; Bree Masters; Jacinta Beecher; Naa Anang; Mia Gross | Australia |

The women's 4 × 100 metres relay at the 2022 Commonwealth Games, as part of the athletics programme, is taking place at the Alexander Stadium on 6 August & 7 August 2022.

On 14 July 2023, it was confirmed that the Nigerian team had been disqualified for an anti-doping infringement. As a result, England were promoted to gold, Jamaica to silver and Australia to bronze.

== Records ==
Prior to this competition, the existing world and Games records were as follows:

| World record | United States (Tianna Madison, Allyson Felix, Bianca Knight, Carmelita Jeter) | 40.82 | London, United Kingdom | 10 August 2012 |
| Commonwealth record | Jamaica (Briana Williams, Elaine Thompson-Herah, Shelly-Ann Fraser-Pryce, Shericka Jackson) | 41.02 | Tokyo, Japan | 6 August 2021 |
| Games record | Jamaica (Kerron Stewart, Veronica Campbell-Brown, Schillonie Calvert, Shelly-Ann Fraser-Pryce) | 41.83 | Glasgow, Scotland | 2 August 2014 |

== Schedule ==
The schedule was as follows:

| Date | Time | Round |
|---|---|---|
| Saturday 6 August 2022 | 12:15 | First round |
| Sunday 7 August 2022 | 12:54 | Final |

== Results ==
=== First round ===
The first three in each heat (Q) and the next two fastest (q) qualified for the final.

| Rank | Heat | Lane | Nation | Athletes | Time | Notes |
|---|---|---|---|---|---|---|
| 2 | 2 | 2 | England | Asha Philip, Imani-Lara Lansiquot, Bianca Williams, Ashleigh Nelson | 42.72 | Q, SB |
| 3 | 2 | 3 | Australia | Mia Gross, Bree Masters, Jacinta Beecher, Naa Anang | 43.47 | Q |
| 4 | 2 | 4 | Trinidad and Tobago | Khalifa St. Fort, Mauricia Prieto, Akilah Lewis, Michelle-Lee Ahye | 43.48 | q, SB |
| 5 | 1 | 4 | Jamaica | Kemba Nelson, Natalliah Whyte, Remona Burchell, Roneisha McGregor | 43.66 | Q |
| 6 | 2 | 6 | Ghana | Mary Boakye, Latifa Ali, Gifty Oku, Halutie Hor | 44.32 | q, SB |
| 7 | 1 | 7 | India | Dutee Chand, Hima Das, Srabani Nanda, Jyothi Yarraji | 44.45 | Q |
| 8 | 2 | 5 | Papua New Guinea | Adrine Monagi, Toea Wisil, Isila Apkup, Leonie Beu | 45.38 | NR |
| 9 | 1 | 5 | Scotland | Rebecca Matheson, Alisha Rees, Sarah Malone, Taylah Spence | 45.39 | Q |
| 10 | 1 | 6 | Singapore | Shanti Pereira, Nur Izlyn Zaini, Kugapriya Chandran, Bernice Liew Yee Ling | 45.58 | SB |
| 11 | 1 | 3 | Malta | Claire Azzopardi, Janet Richard, Carla Scicluna, Charlotte Wingfield | 45.59 | NR |
| 12 | 1 | 2 | Maldives | Mariyam Hussain, Rifa Mohamed, Aishath Hassan, Aminath Mohamed | 49.19 | NR |
| - | 2 | 7 | Nigeria | Joy Udo-Gabriel, Favour Ofili, Rosemary Chukwuma, Nzubechi Grace Nwokocha | DQ | |

=== Final ===
The medals were determined in the final.

| Rank | Lane | Nation | Athletes | Time | Notes |
|---|---|---|---|---|---|
| 1st place, gold medalist(s) | 5 | England | Asha Philip, Imani-Lara Lansiquot, Bianca Williams, Daryll Neita | 42.41 | SB |
| 2nd place, silver medalist(s) | 6 | Jamaica | Kemba Nelson, Natalliah Whyte, Remona Burchell, Elaine Thompson-Herah | 43.08 | |
| 3rd place, bronze medalist(s) | 8 | Australia | Ella Connolly, Bree Masters, Jacinta Beecher, Naa Anang | 43.16 | |
| 4 | 7 | India | Dutee Chand, Hima Das, Srabani Nanda, Jyothi Yarraji | 43.81 | |
| 5 | 2 | Trinidad and Tobago | Khalifa St. Fort, Michelle-Lee Ahye, Mauricia Prieto, Leah Bertrand | 43.86 | |
| 6 | 3 | Ghana | Mary Boakye, Latifa Ali, Gifty Oku, Halutie Hor | 44.86 | |
| 7 | 9 | Scotland | Rebecca Matheson, Alisha Rees, Sarah Malone, Taylah Spence | 45.01 | |
| - | 4 | Nigeria | Tobi Amusan, Favour Ofili, Rosemary Chukwuma, Nzubechi Grace Nwokocha | ~~42.10~~ | DQ |
