= 2019 World Athletics Championships – Women's 200 metres =

Women's 200 metres at the 2019 World Championships
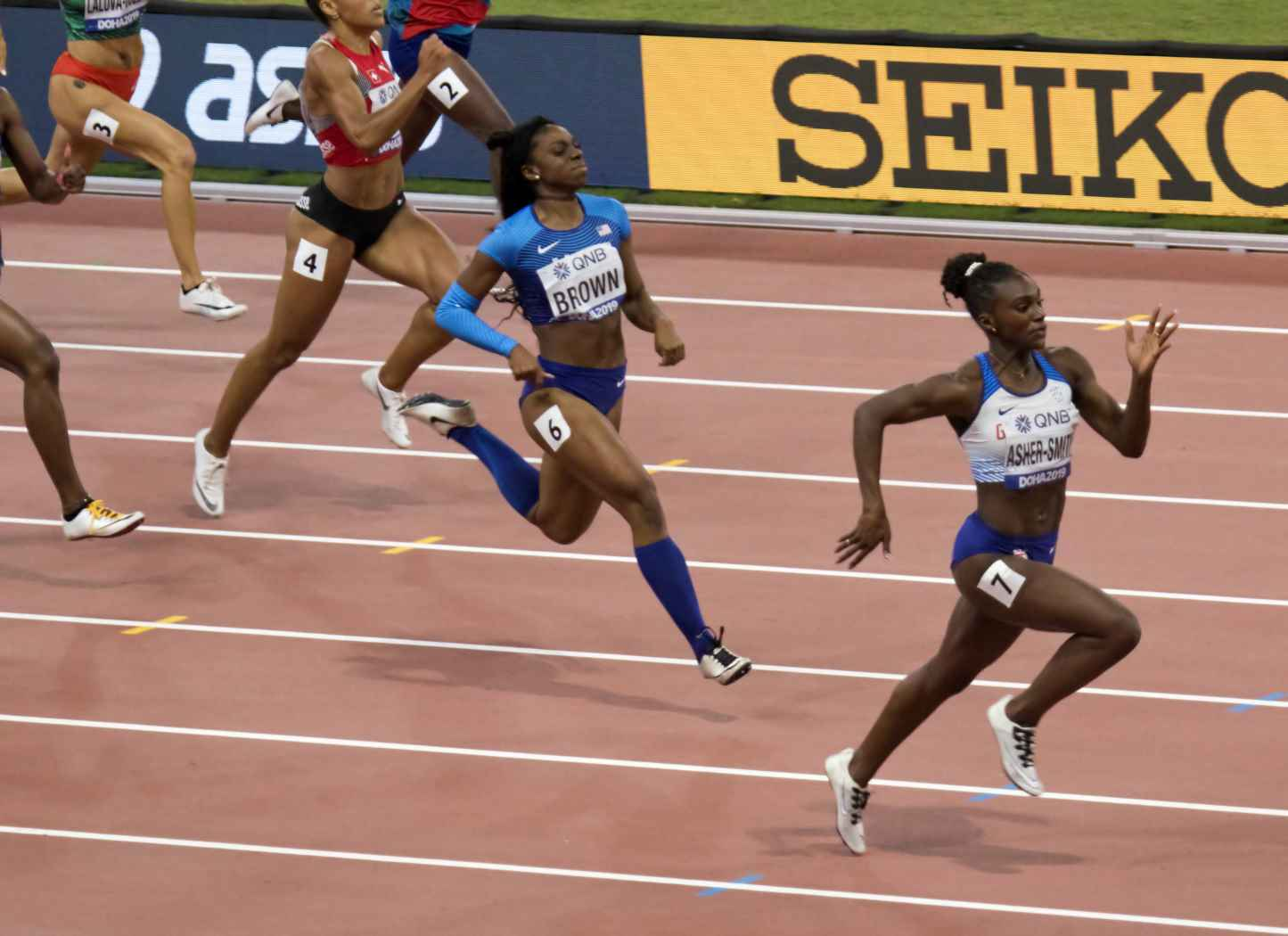
- The final of the event.
- Venue: Khalifa International Stadium
- Dates: 30 September (heats); 1 October (semi-final); 2 October (final)
- Competitors: 45 from 31 nations
- Winning time: 21.88

Medalists
gold medal	Dina Asher-Smith	Great Britain
silver medal	Brittany Brown	United States
bronze medal	Mujinga Kambundji	Switzerland

The women's 200 metres at the 2019 World Athletics Championships was held at the Khalifa International Stadium in Doha, Qatar, from 30 September to 2 October 2019.

== Summary ==
The season world No. 1 and previous bronze medalist Shaunae Miller-Uibo concentrated on the 400 metres and did not enter. The defending champion and world No. 13 Dafne Schippers and previous silver medalist and world No. 9 Marie-Josée Ta Lou opted not to start in the heats. Olympic champion and world No. 2 Elaine Thompson didn't start in the semi-finals. 2013 bronze medallist and world No. 3 Blessing Okagbare was disqualified in the heats due to a lane infringement. 2013 champion and world No. 7 Shelly-Ann Fraser-Pryce focused on 100m. The only athlete in the field with a personal best below 22 seconds was Dina Asher-Smith, making her the overwhelming favorite going into the Championships.

In the first steps of the final, Asher-Smith took a clear lead, making up the stagger on Dezerea Bryant to her outside just after halfway through the turn. As the stagger resolved coming onto the straight, it revealed Bryant was in second place, slightly ahead of Brittany Brown and Mujinga Kambundji, meaning Asher-Smith had a huge lead. Down the straight, the only athlete looking like she was making any progress cutting down the gap was Brown. Asher-Smith didn't let up, crossing the finish line with a clear win by 3 metres, Brown also clearly ahead by another 3 metres over Kambundji.

Asher-Smith's 21.88 was a new British national record. Kambundji won the first sprint medal for Switzerland at a global outdoor championship. The closest was Marcel Schelbert who also took a bronze in the 400 hurdles in 1999.

In the semi-finals, winner Asher-Smith returned to the track to assist an injured rival, Anthonique Strachan, a gesture which earned her a nomination for the International Fair Play Award.

== Records ==
Before the competition records were as follows:

Record	Perf.	Athlete	Nat.	Date	Location
World	21.34	Florence Griffith Joyner	USA	29 Sep 1988	Seoul, South Korea
Championship	21.63	Dafne Schippers	NED	28 Aug 2015	Beijing, China
World leading	21.74	Shaunae Miller-Uibo	BAH	29 Aug 2019	Zürich, Switzerland
African	22.04	Blessing Okagbare	NGA	24 Mar 2018	Abilene, United States
Asian	22.01	Li Xuemei	CHN	24 Mar 2018	Shanghai, China
NACAC	21.34	Florence Griffith Joyner	USA	29 Sep 1988	Seoul, South Korea
South American	22.48	Ana Cláudia Lemos	BRA	6 Aug 2011	São Paulo, Brazil
European	21.63	Dafne Schippers	NED	28 Aug 2015	Beijing, China
Oceanian	22.23	Melinda Gainsford-Taylor	AUS	13 Jul 1997	Stuttgart, Germany

The following records were set at the competition:

Record	Perf.	Athlete	Nat.	Date
Nigerien	22.58	Aminatou Seyni	NIG	30 Sep 2019
British	21.88	Dina Asher-Smith	GBR	2 Oct 2019

== Schedule ==
The event schedule, in local time (UTC+3), was as follows:

Date	Time	Round
30 September	17:05	Heats
1 October	21:35	Semi-finals
2 October	22:35	Final

== Results ==
=== Heats ===
The first three in each heat (Q) and the next six fastest (q) qualify for the semifinal.

Wind:
Heat 1: -0.3 m/s, Heat 2: +0.2 m/s, Heat 3: +0.7 m/s, Heat 4: +0.4 m/s, Heat 5: +0.8 m/s, Heat 6: -0.1 m/s

Rank	Heat	Lane	Name	Nationality	Time	Notes
1	4	7	Dina Asher-Smith	Great Britain & N.I.	22.32	Q
2	3	9	Brittany Brown	United States	22.33	Q, PB
3	6	8	Anglerne Annelus	United States	22.56	Q
4	4	6	Dezerea Bryant	United States	22.56	Q
5	4	5	Tynia Gaither	Bahamas	22.57	Q, SB
6	5	2	Aminatou Seyni	Niger	22.58	Q, NR
7	3	5	Elaine Thompson	Jamaica	22.61	Q
8	5	4	Tatjana Pinto	Germany	22.63	Q, PB
9	5	8	Gina Bass	Gambia	22.67	Q
10	3	3	Lisa-Marie Kwayie	Germany	22.77	Q, PB
11	3	6	Maja Mihalinec	Slovenia	22.78	q, PB
12	2	7	Ivet Lalova-Collio	Bulgaria	22.79	Q
13	2	5	Jodie Williams	Great Britain & N.I.	22.80	Q
14	2	2	Mujinga Kambundji	Switzerland	22.81	Q
15	1	2	Anthonique Strachan	Bahamas	22.86	Q
16	2	6	Basant Hemida	Egypt	22.88	q
17	4	3	Jamile Samuel	Netherlands	22.90	q, SB
18	6	9	Carolle Zahi	France	22.99	Q
19	4	8	Crystal Emmanuel	Canada	23.00	q
20	3	2	Marileidy Paulino	Dominican Republic	23.04	q, SB
21	1	4	Kamaria Durant	Trinidad and Tobago	23.08	Q
22	4	4	Jessica-Bianca Wessolly	Germany	23.10	q
23	6	3	Beth Dobbin	Great Britain & N.I.	23.14	Q
24	1	3	Shashalee Forbes	Jamaica	23.15	Q
25	5	3	Olga Safronova	Kazakhstan	23.16	
26	6	4	Krystsina Tsimanouskaya	Belarus	23.22	
27	6	5	Imke Vervaet	Belgium	23.24	PB
28	2	9	Liang Xiaojing	China	23.27	
29	1	6	Sarah Atcho	Switzerland	23.29	
30	3	8	Gunta Vaičule	Latvia	23.32	
31	2	3	Mauricia Prieto	Trinidad and Tobago	23.33	
32	4	2	Gloria Hooper	Italy	23.33	
33	4	9	Gulsumbi Sharifova	Tajikistan	23.45	
34	6	7	Rafaéla Spanoudaki-Hatziriga	Greece	23.48	
35	6	2	Schillonie Calvert-Powell	Jamaica	23.52	
36	2	8	Sindija Bukša	Latvia	23.53	
37	1	5	Phil Healy	Ireland	23.56	
38	5	6	Lorraine Martins	Brazil	23.56	
39	5	5	Zhang Man	China	23.60	
40	2	4	Archana Suseendran	India	23.65	
41	3	7	Vitória Cristina Rosa	Brazil	23.81	
42	1	8	Zoe Hobbs	New Zealand	23.94	
43	5	7	Shanti Pereira	Singapore	24.00	
	5	9	Blessing Okagbare	Nigeria	DQ	163.3(a)
	6	6	Natacha Ngoye Akamabi	Congo	DQ	163.3(a)
	1	7	Marie-Josée Ta Lou	Ivory Coast	DNS	
	1	9	Dafne Schippers	Netherlands	DNS	
	3	4	Ketura Ndoye Ti Nzapa	Central African Republic	DNS	

=== Semi-finals ===
The first two in each heat (Q) and the next two fastest (q) qualified for the final.

Wind:
Heat 1: +0.4 m/s, Heat 2: +0.4 m/s, Heat 3: +0.5 m/s

Rank	Heat	Lane	Name	Nationality	Time	Notes
1	3	6	Dina Asher-Smith	Great Britain & N.I.	22.16	Q
2	2	5	Brittany Brown	United States	22.46	Q
3	1	5	Anglerne Annelus	United States	22.49	Q
4	1	9	Mujinga Kambundji	Switzerland	22.49	Q
5	3	4	Dezerea Bryant	United States	22.56	Q
6	2	9	Tynia Gaither	Bahamas	22.57	Q, SB
7	2	7	Ivet Lalova-Collio	Bulgaria	22.58	q
8	3	9	Gina Bass	Gambia	22.60	q
9	1	3	Crystal Emmanuel	Canada	22.65	SB
10	1	6	Aminatou Seyni	Niger	22.77	
11	1	4	Jodie Williams	Great Britain & N.I.	22.78	
12	3	3	Maja Mihalinec	Slovenia	22.81	
13	3	8	Lisa-Marie Kwayie	Germany	22.83	
14	2	2	Basant Hemida	Egypt	22.92	
15	1	2	Jamile Samuel	Netherlands	23.02	
16	2	4	Carolle Zahi	France	23.03	
17	3	2	Marileidy Paulino	Dominican Republic	23.03	SB
18	1	7	Tatjana Pinto	Germany	23.11	
19	2	8	Beth Dobbin	Great Britain & N.I.	23.11	
20	1	8	Shashalee Forbes	Jamaica	23.14	
21	2	3	Jessica-Bianca Wessolly	Germany	23.37	
22	3	5	Kamaria Durant	Trinidad and Tobago	23.44	
23	3	7	Anthonique Strachan	Bahamas	25.44	
	2	6	Elaine Thompson	Jamaica	DNS	

=== Final ===
The final was started on 2 October 22:35.

Wind: +0.9 m/s

Rank	Lane	Name	Nationality	Time	Notes
1st place, gold medalist(s)	7	Dina Asher-Smith	Great Britain & N.I.	21.88	NR
2nd place, silver medalist(s)	6	Brittany Brown	United States	22.22	PB
3rd place, bronze medalist(s)	4	Mujinga Kambundji	Switzerland	22.51	
4	5	Anglerne Annelus	United States	22.59	
5	8	Dezerea Bryant	United States	22.63	
6	2	Gina Bass	Gambia	22.71	
7	3	Ivet Lalova-Collio	Bulgaria	22.77	
8	9	Tynia Gaither	Bahamas	22.90	
