= 2022 African Championships in Athletics – Women's 100 metres =

The women's 100 metres event at the 2022 African Championships in Athletics was held on 8 and 9 June in Port Louis, Mauritius.

== Medalists ==
| Gold | Silver | Bronze |
|---|---|---|
| Gina Bass; Gambia | Aminatou Seyni; Niger | Carina Horn; South Africa |

== Results ==
=== Heats ===
Held on 8 June

Qualification: First 3 of each heat (Q) and the next 6 fastest (q) qualified for the semifinals.

Wind:
Heat 1: +1.5 m/s, Heat 2: -0.3 m/s, Heat 3: +1.1 m/s, Heat 4: -0.5 m/s, Heat 5: +0.5 m/s, Heat 6: +2.2 m/s, Heat 7: +1.9 m/s

| Rank | Heat | Name | Nationality | Time | Notes |
|---|---|---|---|---|---|
| 1 | 7 | Aminatou Seyni | Niger | 11.07 | Q |
| 2 | 4 | Carina Horn | South Africa | 11.27 | Q |
| 3 | 1 | Gina Bass | Gambia | 11.36 | Q |
| 4 | 1 | Maximila Imali | Kenya | 11.50 | Q |
| 5 | 3 | Quincy Malekani | Zambia | 11.52 | Q |
| 6 | 6 | Hellen Makumba | Zambia | 11.57 | Q |
| 7 | 1 | Loungo Matlhaku | Botswana | 11.59 | Q |
| 8 | 1 | Phindile Khubheka | South Africa | 11.64 | q |
| 9 | 2 | Tima Godbless | Nigeria | 11.71 | Q |
| 10 | 4 | Oarabile Tshosa | Botswana | 11.72 | Q |
| 11 | 7 | Balikis Yakubu | Nigeria | 11.76 | Q |
| 12 | 2 | Jacent Nyamahunge | Uganda | 11.78 | Q |
| 12 | 4 | Maboundou Koné | Ivory Coast | 11.78 | Q |
| 14 | 5 | Praise Ofoku | Nigeria | 11.80 | Q |
| 15 | 7 | Claudine Nomenjanahary | Madagascar | 11.86 | Q |
| 16 | 5 | Maimuna Jallow | Gambia | 11.88 | Q |
| 17 | 6 | Karel Elodie Ziketh | Ivory Coast | 11.89 | Q |
| 18 | 5 | Pierrick Linda Moulin | Gabon | 11.91 | Q |
| 19 | 4 | Natacha Ngoye Akamabi | Republic of the Congo | 11.96 | q |
| 20 | 3 | Eunice Murandafu | Kenya | 12.00 | Q |
| 21 | 2 | Yabsira Jarso | Ethiopia | 12.01 | Q |
| 22 | 4 | Fatou Sowe | Gambia | 12.02 | q |
| 23 | 1 | Bonguwe Mahlalela | Eswatini | 12.03 | |
| 23 | 5 | Amelie Anthony | Mauritius | 12.03 | |
| 25 | 7 | Michelle Zuze | Zimbabwe | 12.10 | |
| 26 | 6 | Astrid van Hoorn | Mozambique | 12.19 | Q |
| 27 | 6 | Rahel Tesfaye | Ethiopia | 12.21 | |
| 28 | 4 | Monica Safania | Kenya | 12.23 | |
| 29 | 1 | Zo Henintsoa Rakotonary | Madagascar | 12.29 | |
| 30 | 6 | Nyimasata Jawneh | Gambia | 12.32 | |
| 31 | 2 | Akouvi Koumedzina | Togo | 12.37 | |
| 32 | 7 | Fatoumata Koala | Burkina Faso | 12.47 | |
| 33 | 3 | Sade Amor De Sousa | Namibia | 12.52 | Q |
| 34 | 3 | Nancy Tokpah | Liberia | 12.67 | |
| 35 | 3 | Beatrice Midomide | Benin | 12.84 | |
| 36 | 6 | Aissata Deen Conte | Guinea | 12.92 | |
| 37 | 2 | Françoise Kumi | Democratic Republic of the Congo | 13.10 | |
| 38 | 2 | Victória Cassinda | Angola | 13.43 | |
| | 4 | Lucia Moris | South Sudan | DQ | FS |
| | 7 | Rhoda Njobvu | Zambia | DQ | FS |
| | 6 | Tsaone Sebele | Botswana | DNF | |
| | 1 | Latifa Ali | Ghana | DNS | |
| | 1 | Ndèye Arame | Senegal | DNS | |
| | 2 | Ainess Tibishubwamu | Tanzania | DNS | |
| | 3 | Erica Mouwangui | Equatorial Guinea | DNS | |
| | 3 | Halutie Hor | Ghana | DNS | |
| | 4 | Gifty Kwakyewaa Oku | Ghana | DNS | |
| | 5 | Jacira Martins | Guinea-Bissau | DNS | |
| | 5 | Winifrida Makenji | Tanzania | DNS | |
| | 6 | Germaine Abessolo Bivina | Cameroon | DNS | |

=== Semifinals ===
Held on 8 June

Qualification: First 2 of each semifinal (Q) and the next 2 fastest (q) qualified for the final.

Wind:
Heat 1: +0.1 m/s, Heat 2: +3.2 m/s, Heat 3: +1.5 m/s

| Rank | Heat | Name | Nationality | Time | Notes |
|---|---|---|---|---|---|
| 1 | 2 | Aminatou Seyni | Niger | 11.05 | Q |
| 2 | 1 | Gina Bass | Gambia | 11.08 | Q, NR |
| 2 | 3 | Carina Horn | South Africa | 11.08 | Q |
| 4 | 3 | Tima Godbless | Nigeria | 11.25 | Q |
| 5 | 3 | Maximila Imali | Kenya | 11.26 | q |
| 6 | 1 | Quincy Malekani | Zambia | 11.32 | Q |
| 7 | 1 | Oarabile Tshosa | Botswana | 11.33 | q |
| 8 | 2 | Hellen Makumba | Zambia | 11.42 | Q |
| 9 | 2 | Phindile Khubheka | South Africa | 11.44 | |
| 10 | 1 | Maboundou Koné | Ivory Coast | 11.53 | |
| 11 | 3 | Loungo Matlhaku | Botswana | 11.59 | |
| 12 | 2 | Praise Ofoku | Nigeria | 11.62 | |
| 12 | 3 | Jacent Nyamahunge | Uganda | 11.62 | |
| 14 | 1 | Balikis Yakubu | Nigeria | 11.63 | |
| 15 | 2 | Maimuna Jallow | Gambia | 11.71 | |
| 16 | 2 | Karel Elodie Ziketh | Ivory Coast | 11.78 | |
| 17 | 2 | Pierrick Linda Moulin | Gabon | 11.79 | |
| 18 | 3 | Claudine Nomenjanahary | Madagascar | 11.85 | |
| 19 | 2 | Yabsira Jarso | Ethiopia | 11.93 | |
| 20 | 3 | Fatou Sowe | Gambia | 11.95 | |
| 21 | 1 | Eunice Murandafu | Kenya | 11.99 | |
| 22 | 3 | Astrid van Hoorn | Mozambique | 12.13 | |
| 23 | 1 | Sade Amor De Sousa | Namibia | 12.59 | |
| | 1 | Natacha Ngoye Akamabi | Republic of the Congo | DNF | |

=== Final ===
Held on 9 June

Wind: +4.8 m/s

| Rank | Lane | Athlete | Nationality | Time | Notes |
|---|---|---|---|---|---|
| 1st place, gold medalist(s) | 6 | Gina Bass | Gambia | 11.06 | |
| 2nd place, silver medalist(s) | 6 | Aminatou Seyni | Niger | 11.09 | |
| 3rd place, bronze medalist(s) | 6 | Carina Horn | South Africa | 11.14 | |
| 4 | 6 | Tima Godbless | Nigeria | 11.27 | |
| 5 | 6 | Maximila Imali | Kenya | 11.29 | |
| 6 | 6 | Quincy Malekani | Zambia | 11.30 | |
| 7 | 6 | Hellen Makumba | Zambia | 11.50 | |
| | 6 | Oarabile Tshosa | Botswana | DNF | |
