= Niger at the 2022 World Athletics Championships =

- Flag of Niger
- WA code: NIG

in Eugene, United States July 15, 2022 – July 24, 2022
- Competitors: 1 (1 woman)
- Medals: Gold 0 Silver 0 Bronze 0 Total 0

World Athletics Championships appearances
- 1991; 1993; 1995; 1997; 1999; 2001; 2003; 2005; 2007; 2009; 2011; 2013; 2015–2017; 2019; 2022; 2023; 2025

Niger competed at the 2022 World Athletics Championships in Eugene, United States, from 15 to 24 July 2022.

== Results ==
Niger entered 1 athlete, Aminatou Seyni, in both the 100 and 200 metres.

Key

- Q = Qualified for the next round
- q = Qualified for the next round as a fastest loser or, in field events, by position without achieving the qualifying target
- NR = National record
- PB = Personal best
- SB = Season best
- N/A = Round not applicable for the event

=== Women ===
Track and road events

Athlete	Event	Preliminary		Heat		Semi-final		Final	
Athlete	Event	Result	Rank	Result	Rank	Result	Rank	Result	Rank
Aminatou Seyni	100 metres	—N/a		11.09 (+1.2)	14	11.21 (−0.2)	17	did not advance	
Aminatou Seyni	200 metres	—N/a		21.98 (+1.1) NR	1 Q	22.04 (+2.0)	6 Q	22.12 (−0.2)	4
