= Gulsumbi Sharifova =

Tajikistani sprinter

Personal information
- Nationality: Tajikistani
- Born: 2 December 1997 (age 27)

Sport
- Sport: Athletics
- Event: Sprinting

Gulsumbi Sharifova (born 2 December 1997) is a Tajikistani athlete. She competed in the women's 200 metres event at the 2019 World Athletics Championships. She did not advance to compete in the semi-finals.
