= Switzerland at the 2019 World Athletics Championships =

- WA code: SUI
- Website: www.swiss-athletics.ch

in Doha, Qatar
- Competitors: 17 (5 men and 12 women) in 14 events
- Medals Ranked 31st: Gold 0 Silver 0 Bronze 1 Total 1

World Athletics Championships appearances
- 1976; 1980; 1983; 1987; 1991; 1993; 1995; 1997; 1999; 2001; 2003; 2005; 2007; 2009; 2011; 2013; 2015; 2017; 2019; 2022; 2023

Switzerland competed at the 2019 World Athletics Championships in Doha, Qatar from 27 September to 6 October 2019. The country finished in 31st place in the medal table.

== Medalists ==
Medal	Athlete	Event	Date
Bronze	Mujinga Kambundji	Women's 200 metres	October 2

== Results ==
(q – qualified, NM – no mark, SB – season best)

=== Men ===
Track and road events

Athlete	Event	Heat		Semifinal		Final	
Athlete	Event	Result	Rank	Result	Rank	Result	Rank
Alex Wilson	100 m	10.38	38	did not advance			
Alex Wilson	200 m	20.40	20 Q	did not start		did not advance	
Julien Wanders	5000 m	13:38.95	25	—		did not advance	
Tadesse Abraham	Marathon	—				2:11:58	9
Jason Joseph	110 m hurdles	13.39 NR	8 Q	13.53	13	did not advance	
Kariem Hussein	400 m hurdles	50.62	28	did not advance			

=== Women ===
Track and road events

Athlete	Event	Heat		Semifinal		Final	
Athlete	Event	Result	Rank	Result	Rank	Result	Rank
Ajla Del Ponte	100 m	11.36	29	did not advance			
Salomé Kora	100 m	11.48	36	did not advance			
Mujinga Kambundji	100 m	11.17	7 Q	11.10	9	did not advance	
Mujinga Kambundji	200 m	22.81	14 Q	22.49	4 Q	22.51	3rd place, bronze medalist(s)
Sarah Atcho	200 m	23.29	29	did not advance			
Selina Büchel	800 m	2:03.38	25	did not advance			
Lore Hoffmann	800 m	2:03.40	26	did not advance			
Léa Sprunger	400 m hurdles	54.98 SB	4 Q	54.52 SB	8 Q	54.06 NR	4
Ajla Del Ponte; Sarah Atcho; Mujinga Kambundji; Salomé Kora	4 × 100 m relay	42.82	6 Q	—		42.18	4 NR
Léa Sprunger; Fanette Humair; Rachel Pellaud; Yasmin Giger	4 × 400 m relay	3:30.63	14	—		did not advance	

Field events

Athlete	Event	Qualification		Final	
Athlete	Event	Result	Rank	Result	Rank
Nicole Büchler	Pole vault	4.55 SB	18	did not advance	

Combined events – Heptathlon

Athlete	Event	100H	HJ	SP	200 m	LJ	JT	800 m	Final	Rank
Géraldine Ruckstuhl	Result	13.84	1.71	14.28	25.21	5.73	55.35	2:16.02	6159	9
Géraldine Ruckstuhl	Points	1001	867	813	868	768	964	878	6159	9
