= Zhang Man =

Chinese sprinter

Personal information
- Nationality: Chinese
- Born: 20 April 1997 (age 28)

Sport
- Sport: Athletics
- Event: Sprinting

Zhang Man (born 20 April 1997) is a Chinese athlete. She competed in the women's 200 metres event at the 2019 World Athletics Championships. She did not advance to compete in the semi-finals.
