= Carina Horn =

South African sprinter (born 1989)

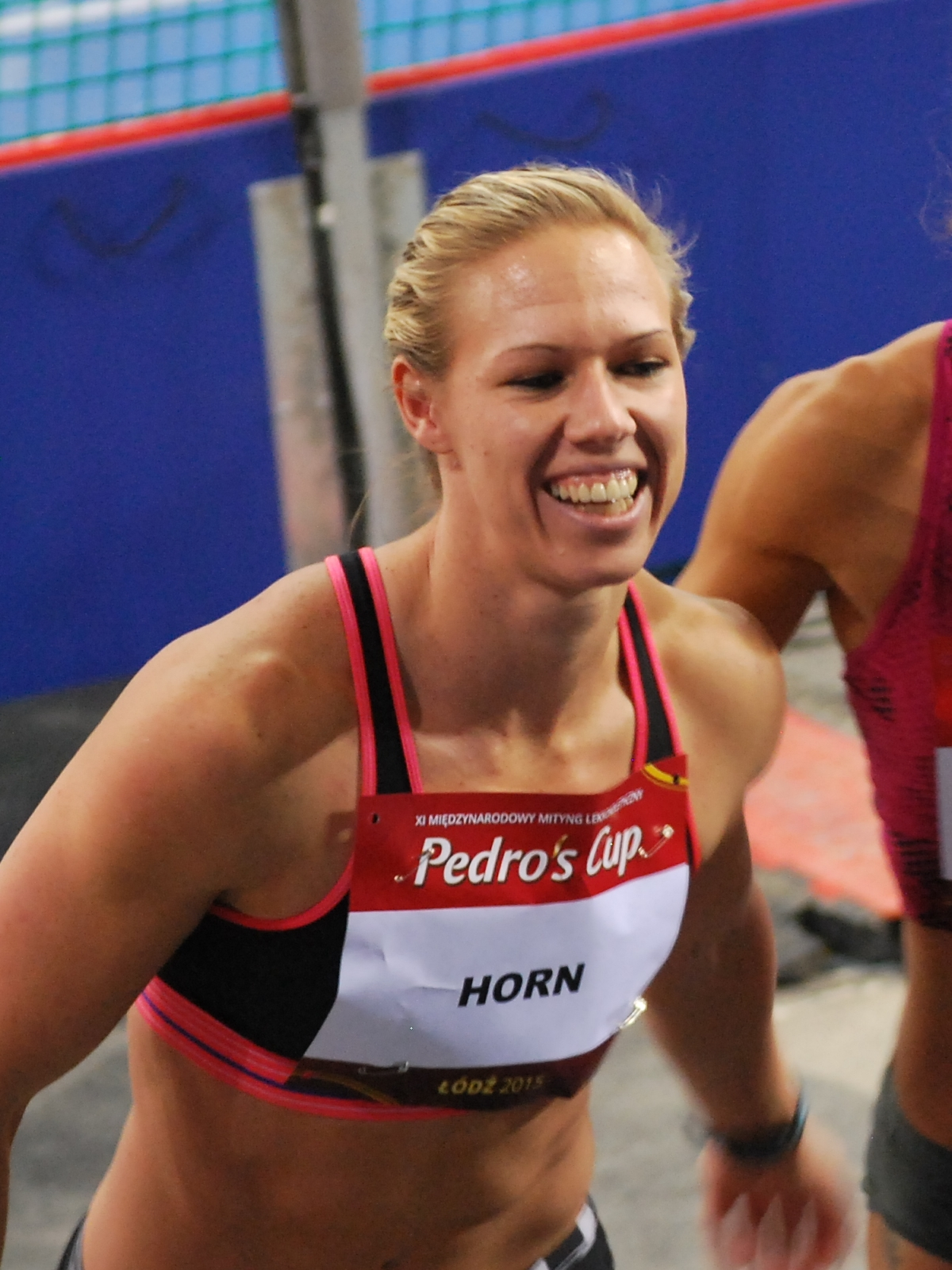
- Horn at the 2015 Pedros Cup

Personal information
- Nationality: South African
- Born: 9 March 1989 (age 37) Ladysmith, South Africa
- Height: 1.68 m (5 ft 6 in)
- Weight: 64 kg (141 lb)

Sport
- Sport: Athletics
- Events: 60 metres 100 metres 4 × 100m Relay
- Coached by: Rainer Schopf
Medal record
Women's athletics
Representing South Africa
African Championships
Gold medal – first place	2016 Durban	4×100 m
Silver medal – second place	2016 Durban	100 m
Bronze medal – third place	2022 Mauritius	100 m

Carina Horn (born 9 March 1989) is a South African sprinter. She competed in the 60 metres at the 2014 IAAF World Indoor Championships reaching the semifinals.

Horn is currently serving a six year competition ban due to expire in March 2029 following an anti-doping rule violation sanction.

== Anti-doping rule violations ==
Horn has been issued with two anti-doping rule violations during her career. Her first ban from 2019 to 2021 was for the unintentional use of LGD-4033 and Ibutamore. Her second ban of six years followed an anti-doping rule violation after testing positive for clenbuterol at a race meet in Spain in 2022.

== International competitions ==
Year	Competition	Venue	Position	Event	Notes
Representing South Africa
2009	Universiade	Belgrade, Serbia	11th (sf)	200 m	24.05
2009	Universiade	Belgrade, Serbia	7th	4 × 100 m relay	45.01
2010	African Championships	Nairobi, Kenya	7th	200 m	24.04
2014	World Indoor Championships	Sopot, Poland	20th (sf)	60 m	7.34
2015	World Championships	Beijing, China	17th (sf)	100 m	11.15
2016	African Championships	Durban, South Africa	2nd	100 m	11.07
2016	African Championships	Durban, South Africa	1st	4 × 100 m relay	43.66
2016	Olympic Games	Rio de Janeiro, Brazil	17th (sf)	100 m	11.20
2017	World Championships	London, United Kingdom	20th (sf)	100 m	11.26
2018	World Indoor Championships	Birmingham, United Kingdom	11th (sf)	60 m	7.18
2022	African Championships	Saint Pierre, Mauritius	3rd	100 m	11.09
2022	World Championships	Eugene, United States	32nd (h)	100 m	11.29

== Personal bests ==
Outdoor

- 100 metres – 10.98 (1.5 m/s, Doha 2018) NR
- 200 metres – 23.43 (Réduit 2011)

Indoor

- 60 metres – 7.09 (Metz 2018)
