= The Gambia at the 1983 World Championships in Athletics =

- Flag of the Gambia
- WA code: GAM

in Helsinki, Finland August 7–14, 1983
- Competitors: 3 (2 men and 1 woman) in 4 events
- Medals: Gold 0 Silver 0 Bronze 0 Total 0

World Championships in Athletics appearances
- 1976; 1980; 1983; 1987; 1991; 1993; 1995; 1997; 1999; 2001; 2003; 2005; 2007; 2009; 2011; 2013; 2015; 2017; 2019; 2022; 2023; 2025

The Gambia competed at the 1983 World Championships in Athletics in Helsinki, Finland, from August 7 to 14, 1983.

== Men ==
Track and road events

Athlete	Event	Heat		Quarterfinal		Semifinal		Final	
Athlete	Event	Result	Rank	Result	Rank	Result	Rank	Result	Rank
Banana Jarjue	100 metres	11.04	54	Did not advance					
Sheikh Omar Faye	100 metres	10.76	39	Did not advance					
Sheikh Omar Faye	200 metres	22.30	40	Did not advance					

== Women ==
Track and road events

Athlete	Event	Heat		Quarterfinal		Semifinal		Final	
Athlete	Event	Result	Rank	Result	Rank	Result	Rank	Result	Rank
Amie N'Dow	100 metres	12.63	35	Did not advance					
Amie N'Dow	200 metres	DQ		Did not advance					
