= Beth Dobbin =

British sprinter (born 1994)

- Dobbin in 2012

Personal information
- Full name: Bethany Mae Dobbin
- Born: 7 June 1994 (age 32) Doncaster, South Yorkshire, England

Sport
- Country: Great Britain; Scotland
- Sport: Women's athletics
- Events: 200 m, 4 x 100 m, 4 x 400 m
Medal record
Representing Scotland
Commonwealth Games
Bronze medal – third place	2022 Birmingham	4x400 m
Representing Great Britain
Athletics World Cup
Bronze medal – third place	2018 London	200 m

Bethany Mae Dobbin (born 7 June 1994) is a British former sprinter who competed mainly in the 200 metres. She is the Scottish record holder for the 200 metres with a time of 22.50 secs. She represented Great Britain at the Tokyo Olympics in 2021.

== Personal life ==
Dobbin was born on 7 June 1994 in Doncaster. She is the daughter of former Celtic, Grimsby Town, Barnsley and Doncaster Rovers footballer Jim Dobbin. She currently suffers from the chronic illness ME/CFS, spending more than 22 hours in bed most days, and is advocating for UK research funding for the disease.

== Career ==
Dobbin's season best for the 200 metres in 2016 was 23.94 secs at Loughbrough in June. In 2017, she improved her best to 23.31 secs in her heat at the British Championships in July, going on to finish sixth in the final in 23.42.

Dobbin broke the Scottish 200m record four times in June/July 2018. Sandra Whittaker's previous record of 22.98 secs had stood since 1984. Dobbin ran 22.84 at Eton on 2 June, 22.83 at the Diamond League in Stockholm on 10 June, then improved the record twice more at the British Championships in Birmingham on 1 July, running 22.75 in her heat, before winning the final in 22.59. Her other best times include 11.64 secs for the 100 metres (2018) and 53.21 secs for the 400 metres (2018 indoors).

On 15 July 2018, Dobbin finished third in the 200 metres at the Athletics World Cup in London in 22.95 secs. She competed a month later at the European Championships in Berlin, and finished second in her 200 metres semi-final in 22.84 secs on 10 August, to automatically qualify for the following days final, where she finished seventh in a time of 22.93 secs.

On 20 July 2019, Dobbin finished third in the 200 metres at the Müller Anniversary Games in London in a new personal best of 22.50 secs, improving her own Scottish Record by 0.09 secs.

Dobbin was selected to run in the women's 200 metres at the 2020 Summer Olympics. She qualified from her heat but was eliminated in the semi-final in a time of 22.78 secs.

Dobbin was part of the British 4 x 100 metres quartet than ran a world leading time and set a new meeting record at the British Grand Prix of 42.29 seconds in May 2022.

In April 2026, Dobbin announced her retirement from athletics after what she said had been a three-year battle with a "serious and life-changing health issue." In October 2026, Dobbin shared that her illness is myalgic encephalomyelitis/chronic fatigue syndrome, which she developed after a COVID-19 infection and glandular fever, and that she spent 22 hours a day in bed. On 21 October, she wrote to Prime Minister Andy Burnham to request more funding into ME research. Over 360 sportspeople including Tom Daley and Dina Asher-Smith then signed another letter, asking Burnham to meet Dobbin and commit to increased funding for ME research.

== International competitions ==
Year	Competition	Venue	Position	Event	Notes
Representing Great Britain and Scotland
2018	World Cup	London, United Kingdom	3rd	200 m	22.95
2018	European Championships	Berlin, Germany	7th	200 m	22.93
2019	World Championships	Doha, Qatar	19th (sf)	200 m	23.11
2021	European Team Championships	Chorzów, Poland	1st	200 m	22.78
2021	Olympic Games	Tokyo, Japan	15th (sf)	200 m	22.85
2021	Diamond League Final	Brussels, Belgium	6th	200 m	22.88
2022	World Championships	Eugene, United States	24th (h)	200 m	23.04
2022	Commonwealth Games	Birmingham, United Kingdom	8th	200 m	23.40
2022	Commonwealth Games	Birmingham, United Kingdom	3rd	4 x 400 m	3:30.15
2022	European Championships	Munich, Germany	–	200 m	DQ
2022	Diamond League Final	Zurich, Switzerland	8th	200 m	23.83

== Domestic medal record ==
Competition		Pos	Pos	Years
Outdoor	British Championships	1st	200 m	2018
Outdoor	British Championships	2nd	200 m	2019, 2021, 2022
Outdoor	CAU Inter-County Championships	2nd	200 m	2016, 2017
Outdoor	Scottish Championships	2nd	200 m	2016, 2017
Indoor	BUCS Championships	2nd	200 m	2015, 2016
Indoor	Scottish Championships	2nd	200 m	2015
Indoor	Scottish Championships	3rd	200 m	2014
Indoor	England Athletics U20 Championships	2nd	200 m	2013
