= The Gambia at the 2011 World Championships in Athletics =

- WA code: GAM
- National federation: The Gambia Athletics Association

in Daegu
- Competitors: 2
- Medals: Gold 0 Silver 0 Bronze 0 Total 0

World Championships in Athletics appearances
- 1976; 1980; 1983; 1987; 1991; 1993; 1995; 1997; 1999; 2001; 2003; 2005; 2007; 2009; 2011; 2013; 2015; 2017; 2019; 2022; 2023; 2025

The Gambia competed at the 2011 World Championships in Athletics from August 27 to September 4 in Daegu, South Korea. A team of 2 athletes was announced to represent the country in the event.

== Results ==
=== Men ===
| Athlete | Event | Preliminaries | | Heats | | Semifinals | | Final | |
| Athlete | Event | Time Width Height | Rank | Time Width Height | Rank | Time Width Height | Rank | Time Width Height | Rank |
|---|---|---|---|---|---|---|---|---|---|
| Suwaibou Sanneh | 100 metres | | | 10.50 | 30 | Did not advance | | | |

=== Women ===
| Athlete | Event | Preliminaries | | Heats | | Semifinals | | Final | |
| Athlete | Event | Time Width Height | Rank | Time Width Height | Rank | Time Width Height | Rank | Time Width Height | Rank |
|---|---|---|---|---|---|---|---|---|---|
| Fanny Shonobi | 200 metres | | | 25.55 SB | 36 | Did not advance | | | |
