= Inni Aboubacar =

Nigerien long-distance runner (born 1948)

Personal information
- Nationality: Nigerien
- Born: 1948 (age 77–78)

Sport
- Sport: Long-distance running
- Event: Marathon

Inni Aboubacar (born 1948) is a Nigerien long-distance runner. He competed in the men's marathon at the 1988 Summer Olympics.
