= Latifa Ali =

Ghanaian sprinter

Personal information
- Nationality: Ghanaian
- Born: 15 December 1998 (age 27) Kumasi

Sport
- Sport: Track and field
- Event(s): 100 metres, 200 metres, 400 metres

Latifa Ali (born 15 December 1998) is a Ghanaian track and field sprinter. She competed for Ghana at the 2022 Commonwealth Games in Birmingham, England.

== Education ==
Ali attended T.I. Ahmadiyya Senior High School in Kumasi and University of Cape Coast, where she was an athlete in both schools. She competed in multiple events including 100 m and 200 m sprints, relays, pole vault and high jump. In 2020, she secured a US Athletics Scholarship to Coppin State University.

== Career ==
Ali twice won gold at the grand finals of the Ghana Fastest Human Competition, women's category, in 2014 and 2019. She placed second in the 2017 and 2018 editions of the competition.

She competed for Ghana at the 2019 Summer Universiade, competing in the 100 metres, 200 metres, long jump, 4 × 100 metres relay and 4 × 400 metres relay. She was the Ghana University Students Association (GUSA) 200m champion in 2019. In 2020, she secured a US Athletics Scholarship to Coppin State University.

She competed for Ghana for the first time at the 2021 World Athletics Relays in the Women's 4 × 100 metres relay. In 2022, she competed at the Commonwealth Games in Birmingham, England. She was a member of the quartet who competed for Ghana in the Women's 4 × 100 metres relay. They qualified for the finals as one of the two fastest times in the heats. They placed 7th in the finals, however after Nigeria was disqualified, they moved in to 6th.

In 2020, Ali moved to Coppin State University. In February 2023, she set a university record after she won the 400m in Last Chance Indoor National Qualifier at Boston University Track & Tennis Center clocking 52.60 seconds and this unofficially broke the Ghanaian indoor record.
