= The Gambia at the 2019 World Athletics Championships =

The Gambia at the 2019 World Championships in Athletics
- WA code: GAM

in Doha, Qatar
- Competitors: 2
- Medals: Gold 0 Silver 0 Bronze 0 Total 0

World Championships in Athletics appearances
- 1976; 1980; 1983; 1987; 1991; 1993; 1995; 1997; 1999; 2001; 2003; 2005; 2007; 2009; 2011; 2013; 2015; 2017; 2019; 2022; 2023

The Gambia competed at the 2019 World Championships in Athletics in Doha, Qatar, from 27 September–6 October 2019.

== Results ==
(q – qualified, NM – no mark, SB – season best)

=== Men ===
Track and road events

| Athlete | Event | Preliminary | | Heat | | Semi-final | | Final | |
| Athlete | Event | Result | Rank | Result | Rank | Result | Rank | Result | Rank |
|---|---|---|---|---|---|---|---|---|---|
| Ebrima Camara | 100 metres | 10.36 | 4 Q | 10.38 | 39 | Did not advance | | | |

=== Women ===
Track and road events

| Athlete | Event | Heat | | Semi-final | | Final | |
| Athlete | Event | Result | Rank | Result | Rank | Result | Rank |
|---|---|---|---|---|---|---|---|
| Gina Bass | 100 metres | 11.25 | 17 Q | 11.24 | 15 | Did not advance | |
| Gina Bass | 200 metres | 22.67 | 9 Q | 22.60 | 8 q | 22.71 | 6 |
