= Ella Connolly =

Australian sprinter (born 2000)

Personal information
- Born: 13 July 2000 (age 26) Rockhampton, Queensland, Australia
- Height: 1.74 m (5 ft 9 in)

Sport
- Country: Australia
- Sport: Sprinting
- Events: 60 metres, 100 metres, 200 metres, 400 metres, 4 × 100 metres, 4 × 400 metres
Medal record
Women's athletics
Representing Australia
World Indoor Championships
Bronze medal – third place	2025 Nanjing	4 × 400 m relay
World U20 Championships
Silver medal – second place	2018 Finland	4 × 400 metres relay
Commonwealth Games
Bronze medal – third place	2022 Birmingham	4 × 100 m relay
Oceania Championships
Gold medal – first place	2024 Suva	100 m
Commonwealth Youth Games
Gold medal – first place	2017 Nassau	4x100 m mixed relay
Silver medal – second place	2017 Nassau	400 m
Bronze medal – third place	2017 Nassau	200 m

Ella Connolly (born 13 July 2000) is an Australian sprinter.

== Early life ==
Connolly was born in Rockhampton, Queensland and moved to the Moreton Bay region at a young age where she attended St Eugene College and St Columban's College throughout her upbringing. She began competing in athletics events at the age of 10 when she signed up to participate in the Queensland Little Athletics program in Deception Bay. In 2021, she moved to the Gold Coast to begin training under 1996 Olympian Mark Ladbrook at Griffith University's Gold Coast campus. Connolly briefly relocated to Sydney in 2023 to train under Andrew Murphy before returning to her home state in 2025 to train under coach Andrew Iselin at the Queensland Academy of Sport. She is currently in a relationship with professional AFL player Nick Blakey.

== Athletics career ==
She competed in the women's 4 × 400 metres relay at the 2017 World Championships in Athletics and at the 2018 IAAF World U20 Championships, with the latter Australian team and this Connolly winning the silver medal.

Connolly was the national 100 m and 200 m champion in 2022 and part of the Australian 4 × 100 m relay team which set a championship record in winning the 2022 Oceania Athletics Championships. She made her individual debut at the World Athletics Championships in 2022 in the 200 metres. A couple of weeks later, Connolly was part of the Australian sprint relay team which finished third in the 4 × 100 m relay at the 2022 Commonwealth Games.

Connolly was a member of the relay teams that broke the Australian 4 × 100 m record three times in 2024: first in March at the Sydney Track Classic; then in May in the heats of the World Relay Championships in the Thomas Robinson Stadium, Nassau, Bahamas; and then in July at the London Diamond Leagues Athletics Meet where they ran 42.48 seconds.

She was Oceania 100 m champion in 2024 and competed in the individual 100 metres and the 4 × 100 m relay races at the 2024 Summer Olympics held in Paris.

== Personal bests ==
Event	Time (s)	Wind (m/s)	Location	Date	Notes
60 metres	7.16	+1.3	Sydney, Australia	1 February 2025	
100 metres	11.21wi	+2.1	Brisbane, Australia	23 January 2021	
	11.25=	+0.1	Brisbane, Australia	4 December 2021	
	11.25=	-0.5	Brisbane, Australia	5 March 2022	
200 metres	22.95	+0.6	Brisbane, Australia	6 March 2022	
400 metres	52.21	n/a	Sydney, Australia	12 March 2022	
4 × 100 metres	42.48	n/a	London, England	20 July 2024	AR
