= Jacinta Beecher =

Australian sprinter (born 1998)

Personal information
- Nationality: Australian
- Born: 31 January 1998 (age 28)

Sport
- Sport: Track and Field
- Event: 200 metres
Medal record
Women's athletics
Representing AUS
Commonwealth Games
Bronze medal – third place	2022 Birmingham	4 × 100 m relay

Jacinta Beecher (born 31 January 1998) is an Australian sprinter.

Beecher was a promising junior but the Queenslander suffered 4 years of injuries before posting a new personal best time over 200 metres of 23.28 in Canberra in 2021.

Beecher moved into the top 10 of all time Australian 200 metres runners when she ran a time of 22.70 in May 2022 in Shizuoka, Japan. With that time Beecher achieved the qualifying standard for the 2022 Commonwealth Games as well as the World Championships. Beecher was part of the Australian 4 x 100m sprint relay team that finished third at the 2022 Commonwealth Games. Whilst competing at the 2022 World Athletics Championships – Women's 200 metres Beecher qualified for the semi-finals with a third-place heat run of 23.22 behind Jenna Prandini and Favour Ofili.

== Personal bests ==
Event	Time (s)	Wind (m/s)	Location	Date	Notes
100 metres	11.44	+1.2	Trieste, Italy	23 January 2021	
200 metres	22.705	-0.2	Fukuroi, Japan	3 May 2022	
