= Imani-Lara Lansiquot =

British sprinter

Imani-Lara Lansiquot OLY
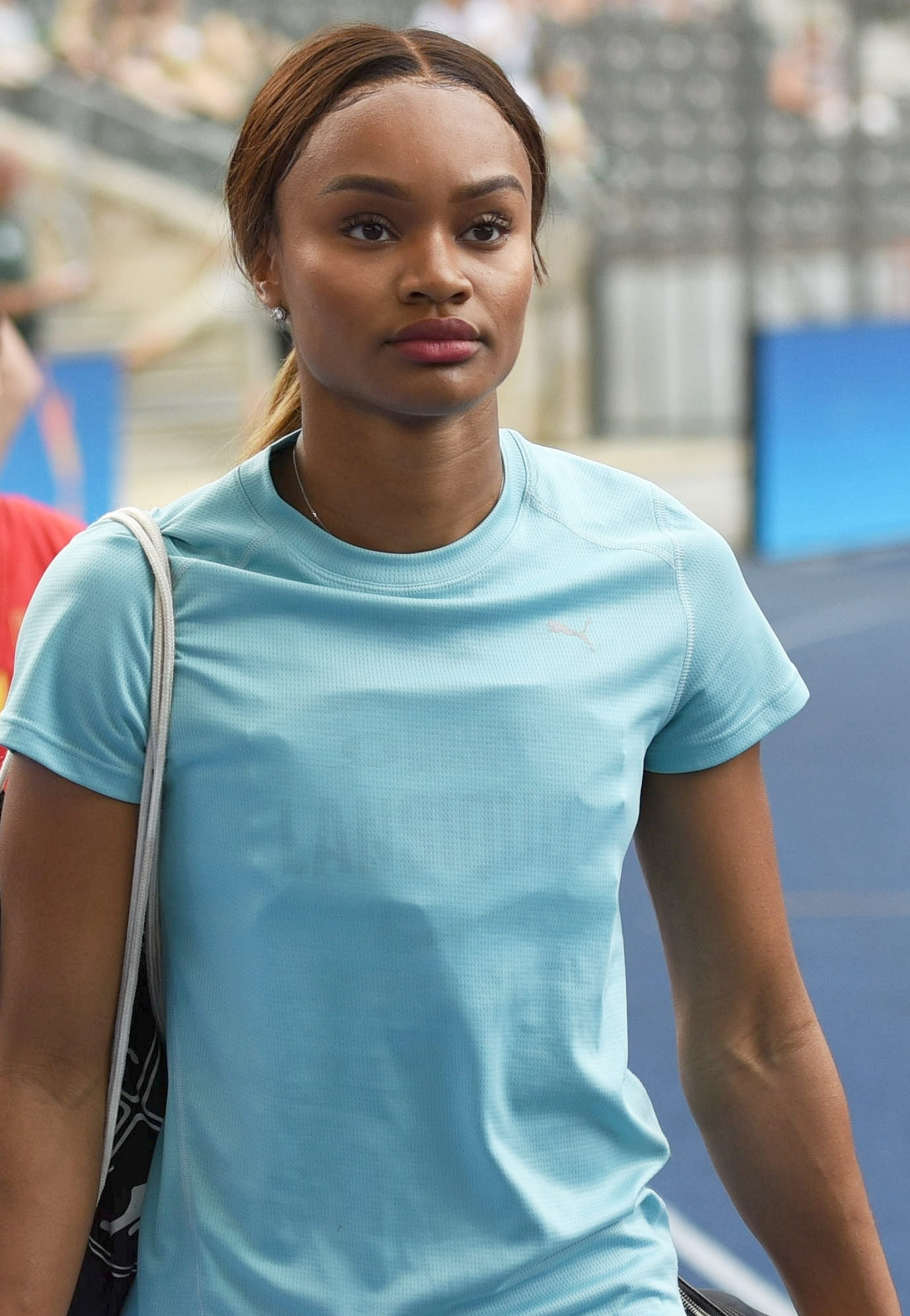
- Lansiquot in 2019

Personal information
- Nationality: British; English
- Born: 17 December 1997 (age 28) Peckham, England

Sport
- Country: Great Britain; England
- Sport: Athletics
- Event: Sprinting
- Club: Sutton and District Athletics Club
Medal record
Women's athletics
Representing Great Britain
Olympic Games
Silver medal – second place	2024 Paris	4 × 100 m relay
Bronze medal – third place	2020 Tokyo	4 × 100 m relay
World Championships
Silver medal – second place	2019 Doha	4 × 100 m relay
Bronze medal – third place	2023 Budapest	4 × 100 m relay
World Ultimate Championship
Third place	2026 Budapest	Mixed 4 × 100 m relay
European Championships
Gold medal – first place	2018 Berlin	4 × 100 m relay
Gold medal – first place	2026 Birmingham	4 × 100 m relay
Representing England
Commonwealth Games
Gold medal – first place	2022 Birmingham	4 × 100 m relay

Imani-Lara Lansiquot (born 17 December 1997) is an English sprinter who competes mainly in the 100 metres. She finished fourth in the 100 metres finals at both the 2016 IAAF World U20 Championships and the 2017 European U23 Championships. In the 4 × 100 metres relay, she won a gold medal at the 2018 European Championships, silver at the 2019 World Championships (where she ran in the heats but not the final), and bronze at the 2020 Tokyo Olympics. Her 100 metres personal best of 10.99 secs, ranks her fourth on the UK all-time list.

== Career ==
Born in Peckham, Lansiquot first ran inside 12 seconds for the 100 metres as a 15-year-old, winning the Surrey Schools Championships in 11.98 in June 2013 and winning the English Schools Championships in 11.91 in July 2013.

Lansiquot ran 11.56 secs in her heat at the 2015 European Junior Championships, before going on to finish fifth in the final in 11.74. She then won a gold medal in the 4 × 100 metres relay. The following year, she ran 11.17 secs in her heat at the 2016 World U20 Championships, to move to second on the UK under 20 all-time list behind Dina Asher-Smith (11.14 in 2014). She finished fourth in the final with 11.37 secs. She also finished fourth in the 100 metres final at the 2017 European U23 Championships in 11.58.

At the 2018 Anniversary Games in London, Lansiquot ran a season's best of 11.19 secs in her heat, before improving her personal best to 11.11 in the final, to move to sixth on the UK all-time list. She ranks eighth on the UK all-time 60 metres list with 7.21 secs (2018).

In August 2018 at the European Championships in Berlin, Lansiquot finished sixth in the 100 metres final in 11.14 secs, before winning a gold medal in the 4 × 100 metres relay.

At the 2019 World Championships in Doha, she reached the 100 metres semi-finals and ran 11.35 secs, having run 11.31 to qualify as a fastest loser from the heats. She went on to win a silver medal in the 4 × 100 m relay, where she ran in the heats before having to withdraw from the final due to injury.

In 2020 she became British champion when winning the 100 metres event at the 2020 British Athletics Championships with a time of 11.26 sec.

In 2023, she improved her 100 m personal best to 10.99 seconds, becoming the third British woman ever to go under 11 seconds. She was selected for the World Championships in the 100 m, however she was disqualified for a false start. She won a bronze medal in the 4 × 100 m relay, where she ran on the second leg.

After winning the 100 metres bronze medal at the 2024 British Athletics Championships, Lansiquot was subsequently named in the Great Britain team for the 2024 Summer Olympics where she went out in the semi-finals. Later at the Games she won a silver medal in the 4 × 100 metres relay.

== Personal life ==
Lansiquot attended Coloma Convent Girls' School and Trinity School, and went on to study psychology at King's College London.

She has written a play, titled "Armour of Gaza" which explores "her identity, career and culture" and celebrates her Peckham roots. Her father is of Saint Lucian descent, and her mother is of Nigerian descent. She is named after the Trinidadian cricketer Brian Lara.

== Athletic Achievements ==
=== Personal bests ===
Type	Distance	Time (s)	Wind (m/s)	Venue	Date	Notes
Individual events
Indoor	50 metres	6.36	—N/a	Ostrava, Czech Republic	3 February 2026	
Indoor	60 metres	7.17	—N/a	London, United Kingdom	1 February 2023	
Outdoor	100 metres	10.99	0.0	Bellinzona, Switzerland	4 September 2023	
Outdoor	150 metres	17.21	+0.3	London, United Kingdom	21 April 2025	
Outdoor	200 metres	22.93	+1.4	Poznań, Poland	27 May 2022	
Team events
Outdoor	4x100 metres relay	41.55	—N/a	Tokyo, Japan	5 August 2021	NR

=== International competitions ===
Year	Competition	Venue	Position	Event	Notes
2015	European Junior Championships	Eskilstuna, Sweden	5th	100 m	11.74
2015	European Junior Championships	Eskilstuna, Sweden	1st	4 × 100 m	44.18
2016	World U20 Championships	Bydgoszcz, Poland	4th	100 m	11.37
2017	European U23 Championships	Bydgoszcz, Poland	4th	100 m	11.58
2018	Athletics World Cup	London, United Kingdom	1st	4 × 100 m	42.52
2018	European Championships	Berlin, Germany	6th	100 m	11.14
2018	European Championships	Berlin, Germany	1st	4 × 100 m	41.80
2019	World Championships	Doha, Qatar	22nd (sf)	100 m	11.35
2019	World Championships	Doha, Qatar	2nd	4 × 100 m	42.25 (h)
2021	Olympic Games	Tokyo, Japan	3rd	4 × 100 m	41.88
2022	World Championships	Eugene, United States	24th (h)	100 m	11.24
2022	World Championships	Eugene, United States	6th	4 × 100 m	42.75
2022	European Championships	Munich, Germany	5th	100 m	11.21
2023	World Championships	Budapest, Hungary	–	100 m	DQ
2023	World Championships	Budapest, Hungary	3rd	4 × 100 m	41.97
2024	Olympic Games	Paris, France	17th (sf)	100 m	11.21
2024	Olympic Games	Paris, France	2nd	4 × 100 m	41.85
2026	Commonwealth Games	Glasgow, United Kingdom	4th	100 m	11.02
2026	European Championships	Birmingham, United Kingdom	10th (sf)	100 m	11.16
2026	European Championships	Birmingham, United Kingdom	1st	4 × 100 m	42.05
