= Singapore at the 2022 World Athletics Championships =

- Flag of Singapore
- WA code: SGP
- National federation: Singapore Athletic Association
- Website: www.singaporeathletics.org.sg

in Eugene, United States 15–24 July 2022
- Competitors: 1 (1 woman) in 1 event
- Medals: Gold 0 Silver 0 Bronze 0 Total 0

World Athletics Championships appearances
- 1983; 1987; 1991; 1993; 1995; 1997; 1999; 2001; 2003; 2005; 2007; 2009; 2011; 2013; 2015; 2017; 2019; 2022; 2023

Singapore competed at the 2022 World Athletics Championships in Eugene, Oregon from 15 to 24 July 2022. Singapore had entered 1 athlete.

== Results ==
Key

- Q = Qualified for the next round
- q = Not qualified for the next round as a fastest loser or, in field events, by position without achieving the qualifying target
- NR = National record
- PB = Personal best
- SB = Season best
- N/A = Round not applicable for the event

=== Women ===
Track and road events

Athlete	Event	Heat		Semi-final		Final	
Athlete	Event	Result	Rank	Result	Rank	Result	Rank
Veronica Shanti Pereira	200 metres	23.53	39	Did not advance			
