= Natalliah Whyte =

Jamaican sprinter

Personal information
- Nationality: Jamaican
- Born: 9 August 1997 (age 28)

Sport
- Country: Jamaica
- Sport: Track and field
- Event: Sprinting
- College team: Auburn Tigers; Florida Atlantic Owls
Medal record
Women's athletics
Representing Jamaica
World Championships
Gold medal – first place	2019 Doha	4 × 100 m relay
Silver medal – second place	2022 Eugene	4 × 100 m relay
Commonwealth Games
Silver medal – second place	2022 Birmingham	4 × 100 m relay
NACAC Championships
Bronze medal – third place	2022 Freeport	4 × 100 m relay
Summer Youth Olympics
Gold medal – first place	2014 Nanjing	200 m
Carifta Games Junior (U20)
Gold medal – first place	2015 Basse-Terre	100 m
Gold medal – first place	2015 Basse-Terre	4 × 100 m relay

Natalliah Whyte (born 9 August 1997) is a Jamaican track and field athlete who specializes in sprint. She represented the Jamaica at the 2019 World Athletics Championships, winning a gold medal in 4 × 100 metres relay.

In 2014, she competed in the girls' 200 metres event at the 2014 Summer Youth Olympics held in Nanjing, China.

== Career ==
She won gold with team Jamaica in the women's 4 × 100 metres relay at the 2019 World Championships, and was also a 100 metres finalist.

She attended Auburn University, competing for the Auburn Tigers from 2017 to 2018, before transferring to Florida Atlantic University. She now trains at MVP International in Florida, an extension of the Jamaica-based MVP Track Club. She is coached by Henry Rolle who originally recruited her to Auburn.
