= Mauricia Prieto =

Trinidad and Tobago sprinter

Personal information
- Nationality: Trinidad and Tobago
- Born: 20 November 1995 (age 29)

Sport
- Sport: Athletics
- Events: 100 metres; 200 metres

Mauricia Prieto (born 20 November 1995) is a Trinidad and Tobago track and field athlete who specializes in sprint. She placed fourth in women's 4 × 100 metres relay with the Trinidadian team at the 2019 Pan American Games, and also competed in women's 200 metres. Representing Trinidad and Tobago at the 2019 World Athletics Championships, she competed in women's 200 metres and women's 4 × 100 metres relay. In the 200 metres event she did not advance to compete in the semi-finals.
