= List of Nigerien records in athletics =

The following are the records of Niger in athletics recognized by Fédération Nigérienne d'Athlétisme (FNA).

== Outdoor ==
Key to tables: Awaiting ratification Record not kept by FNA Not ratified or later rescinded by FNA

=== Men ===
Event	Record	Athlete	Date	Meet	Place	Ref.
100 m	10.52	Yacouba Bello	29 May 2005		Niamey, Niger	
200 m	21.24	Yacouba Bello	29 May 2005		Niamey, Niger	
400 m	48.06	Issa Bello	27 May 2005		Niamey, Niger	
800 m	1:50.8	Moussa Daweye	13 July 1983		Saint-Maur, France	
1500 m	3:52.55	Adamou Dogo	13 April 2008		Bamako, Mali	
3000 m	8:15.0	Oumarou Souley	13 May 2000		Niamey, Niger	
5000 m	14:21.4	Inni Aboubacar	6 July 1983		Saint-Maur, France	
10,000 m	30:18.5	Inni Aboubacar	11 July 1980		Grasse, France	
Half marathon	1:06:28	Souley Oumarou	17 December 1995		Niamey, Niger	
Marathon	2:25:05	Abdou Manzo	2 October 1988	Olympic Games	Seoul, South Korea	
110 m hurdles	13.72 (+0.9 m/s)	Badamassi Saguirou	16 June 2021	Meeting Elite de Cergy-Pontoise	Cergy-Pontoise, France	
400 m hurdles	52.33	Nasser Dan Matha	13 December 2005	Jeux de la Francophonie	Niamey, Niger	
3000 m steeplechase	9:14.16	El Hadj Issa Abdoulaye	20 July 2019	Tournoi de la Solidarité	Niamey, Niger	
High jump	2.08 m	Abdou Mahmane Sani	16 May 2004		Cotonou, Benin	
Pole vault	4.90 m	Smaël Madougou	16 June 1999		Meylan, France	
Long jump	7.27 m	Abdoulaye Garba	13 December 2005		Niamey, Niger	
Triple jump	15.40 m	Harouna Doulla	28 May 1994		Niamey, Niger	
Shot put	13.24 m	Lawali Gamji	3 May 1980		Bamako, Mali	
Discus throw	38.94 m	Chaibou Yahaya	18 May 2013		Bamako, Mali	
Hammer throw						
Javelin throw	56.36 m	Abdoulaziz Garba	27 April 2010	CAA Grand Meet	Bamako, Mali	
Decathlon	6235 pts	Smaël Madougou	2-3 June 2001		Saint-Étienne, France	
Decathlon	100m / Long jump / Shot put / High jump / 400m / 110m H / Discus / Pole vault / Javelin / 1500m; 11.70 / 6.55 m w / 10.95 m / 1.77 m / 53.68 / 16.55w / 33.17 m / 4.40 m / 47.07 m / 5:03.17					
20 km walk (road)						
50 km walk (road)						
4 × 100 m relay	41.13	Niger; David Aliou; Yacouba Bello; Abdoulaye Garba; Idrissa Saadou	13 December 2005		Niamey, Niger	
4 × 400 m relay	3:14.07	Niger	20 July 2019	Tournoi de la Solidarité	Niamey, Niger	

=== Women ===
Event	Record	Athlete	Date	Meet	Place	Ref.
100 m	11.07 (+1.9 m/s)	Aminatou Seyni	8 June 2022	African Championships	Saint Pierre, Mauritius	
200 m	21.98 (+1.1 m/s)	Aminatou Seyni	18 July 2022	World Championships	Eugene, United States	
400 m	49.19	Aminatou Seyni	5 July 2019	Diamond League	Lausanne, Switzerland	
800 m	2:12.8	Ramatoulaye Moumouni	11 July 1980		Grasse, France	
1500 m	4:46.8	Ramatoulaye Moumouni	6 July 1980		La Seyne-sur-Mer, France	
3000 m	10:28.09	Rachida Mamane	20 July 1995		Bouaké, Côte d'Ivoire	
5000 m	18:15.7	Rachida Mamane	20 May 1995		Cotonou, Benin	
10,000 m						
Half marathon	1:27:57	Balkissa Abdoulaye	17 September 2015	All-Africa Games	Brazzaville, Republic of the Congo	
Marathon						
100 m hurdles						
400 m hurdles	1:07.39	Rachida Seyni Maikido	16 May 2010	Solidarity Tournament	Niamey, Niger	
3000 m steeplechase						
High jump	1.55 m	Malika Abdou	19 July 2019	Tournoi de la Solidarité	Niamey, Niger	
Pole vault						
Long jump	5.21 m	Yahanatou Ibrahim	27-29 May 2005		Niamey, Niger	
Triple jump	10.04 m	Farida Illaoua	31 May 1998		Niamey, Niger	
Shot put	13.37 m	Leila Yahaya	25 July 2019	West African Championships	Niamey, Niger	
Discus throw	30.83 m	Leila Yahaya	27 July 2019	West African Championships	Niamey, Niger	
Hammer throw						
Javelin throw	32.13 m	Hassia Hassan	16 May 2010	Solidarity Tournament	Niamey, Niger	
Heptathlon						
Heptathlon	100m H / High jump / Shot put / 200m / Long jump / Javelin / 800m					
20 km walk (road)						
50 km walk (road)						
4 × 100 m relay	49.08	Niger	19 May 2001		Ouagadougou, Burkina Faso	
4 × 400 m relay	3:50.30	Niger Aminatou Seyni	21 July 2019	Tournoi de la Solidarité	Niamey, Niger	

== Indoor ==
=== Men ===
Event	Record	Athlete	Date	Meet	Place	Ref.
60 m	7.47	Smaël Madougou	21 January 2006		Aubière, France	
200 m						
400 m						
800 m						
1500 m						
3000 m	8:44.25	Oumarou Souley	9 March 2001	World Championships	Lisbon, Portugal	
60 m hurdles	7.63	Badamassi Saguirou	21 March 2026	World Championships	Toruń, Poland	
High jump	1.89 m	Smaël Madougou	15 December 2007		Aubière, France	
Pole vault	4.80 m	Smaël Madougou	16 January 2000		Faverges, France	
Long jump	6.50 m (Note: record set during heptathlon competition)	Smaël Madougou	26 January 2008		Aubière, France	
Triple jump	14.37 m	Smaël Madougou	18 January 2003		Aubière, France	
Shot put	11.73 m	Smaël Madougou	16 December 2005		Aubière, France	
Heptathlon	4375 pts	Smaël Madougou	25-26 January 2008		Aubière, France	
Heptathlon	60m / Long jump / Shot put / High jump / 60m H / Pole vault / 1000m; 7.67 / 6.50 m / 11.47 m / 1.86 m / 9.74 / 4.10 m / 3:14.46					
5000 m walk						
4 × 400 m relay						

=== Women ===
Event	Record	Athlete	Date	Meet	Place	Ref.
60 m	7.08	Aminatou Seyni	22 February 2023	Villa de Madrid Indoor Meeting	Madrid, Spain	
200 m	22.69	Aminatou Seyni	5 February 2023	Championnats Aura	Lyon, France	
400 m						
800 m						
1500 m						
3000 m						
60 m hurdles						
High jump						
Pole vault						
Long jump						
Triple jump						
Shot put						
Pentathlon						
Pentathlon	60m H / High jump / Shot put / Long jump / 800m					
3000 m walk						
4 × 400 m relay						
