= Nzubechi Grace Nwokocha =

Nigerian sprinter

Personal information
- Nationality: Nigerian
- Born: 7 April 2001 (age 25)

Sport
- Sport: Track and Field
- Events: 100m, 200m

Achievements and titles
- Personal bests: 60M: 7.36 (Clemson Indoor Track & Field Complex, 2022); 100M: 10.97 (Hayward Field, Eugene, 2022); 200M: 22.44 (Hayward Field, Eugene, 2022)

Nzubechi Grace Nwokocha (born 7 April 2001) is a Nigerian sprinter, a multiple time national champion over 100 metres. She was banned following a doping violation at the 2022 Commonwealth Games which caused her country to be stripped of the gold medal in the 4 × 100 m relay. She returned to racing in American Junior College races in 2026.

== Career ==
In 2021, she posted a new personal best time in the 100m of 11.09 and, in the process, became the first Nigerian athlete to qualify for the delayed 2020 Tokyo Olympics. She also won the 100m at the National Sports Festival in Benin.

At the Athletics at the 2020 Summer Olympics – Women's 100 metres, she ran a new personal best time of 11.00 seconds in her heat to qualify for the semi-finals.

In 2022 she came sixth in the final of the NCAA championship in both the 100 metres and the 200 metres. She entered both the 100m and the 200m at the 2022 World Athletics Championships and reached the semi-finals at both events. She also won the Nigerian National Championships over 100 metres.

On 3 September 2022, she was provisionally suspended for the use of banned substances Ostarine and Ligandrol by the Athletics Integrity Unit (AIU). A three-year ban was confirmed the following year, with the start of the ban backdated to the date the positive sample was collected, 3 August 2022.

In August 2025, she completed her doping ban, and in February 2026, she officially announced her return to track. She competed for Allen Community College in the United States in the 2026 National Junior College Athletic Association (NJCAA) championships.
