= Aminatou Seyni =

Nigerien sprinter

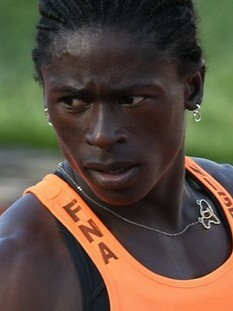

Personal information
- Nationality: Nigerien
- Born: 24 October 1996 (age 30)

Sport
- Country: Niger
- Sport: Athletics
- Event: Sprint

Achievements and titles
- Personal bests: 100 m: 11.07 NR (2022); 200 m: 21.98 NR (2022); 400 m: 50.69 (2018); Indoors; 60 m: 7.08i NR (2023)
Medal record
Women's Athletics
Representing Niger
African Championships
Gold medal – first place	2022 Saint Pierre	200 m
Silver medal – second place	2022 Saint Pierre	100 m

Aminatou Seyni (born 24 October 1996) is a Nigerien track and field sprinter.

She has the Nigerien national records for the 200 metres and 400 metres.

Seyni competed in the women's 100 metres and 200 metres at the 2019 African Games. She reached the semifinals in the women's 100 metres. She finished in 4th place in the women's 200 metres final.

She competed in the women's 200 metres at the 2019 World Athletics Championships. She could not compete in the women's 400 metres due to the IAAF's regulations on testosterone levels for athletes with XY disorders of sex development in women's competition.

She competed in the women's 200 metres at the 2020 Summer Olympics.

== Achievements ==
=== International competitions ===
Representing Niger
Year	Competition	Venue	Position	Event	Notes
2019	African Games	Rabat, Morocco	13rd (sf)	100 m	11.93
2019	African Games	Rabat, Morocco	4th	200 m	23.05
2019	World Championships	Doha, Qatar	10th (sf)	200 m	22.77

=== Personal bests ===
Event	Time (s)	Place	Date	Notes
60 metres indoor	7.08	Madrid, Spain	22 February 2023	NR
100 metres	11.07	St. Pierre, Mauritius	8 June 2022	NR
200 metres	21.98	Eugene, United States	18 July 2022	NR
400 metres	50.69	Rovereto, Italy	23 August 2018	
