= Norfolk Island at the Commonwealth Games =

- CG code: NFK (NFI used at these Games)
- CGA: Norfolk Island Amateur Sports & Commonwealth Games Association
- Website: facebook.com/teamnorfolkisland/
- Medals: Gold 0 Silver 0 Bronze 3 Total 3

Commonwealth Games appearances (overview)
- 1986; 1990; 1994; 1998; 2002; 2006; 2010; 2014; 2018; 2022; 2026; 2030

Norfolk Island, an external territory of Australia, has competed in every Commonwealth Games, held every four years, from 1986 onwards. In 1979, Australia granted the territory limited self-government, and the Commonwealth Games permit certain non-state territories to compete on their own. So it is the Norfolk Island Amateur Sports & Commonwealth Games Association, not the Australian Olympic Committee, that is the organisation responsible for the island's participation in the Games.

Norfolk Island has won three bronze medals, all in bowls. Carmen Anderson won a bronze in the women's singles at the 1994 Commonwealth Games, while Ryan Dixon, Hadyn Evans, and Phillip Jones won bronze in the men's triples at the 2018 Commonwealth Games. Shae Wilson won bronze in the women's singles at the 2026 Commonwealth Games which was played on indoor rinks.

== 1986 Commonwealth Games ==
Due to a boycott by 32 countries over Britain's refusal to impose sanctions on apartheid South Africa, only 27 teams competed at the Edinburgh Games in Norfolk Island's debut.

== 1994 Commonwealth Games ==
The Norfolk Island contingent numbered 22; of the 16 athletes, 14 competed in bowls, while 2 competed in shooting in Victoria, British Columbia, Canada.

In the women's singles lawn bowling event, Carmen Anderson finished with seven points in the round robin, second in pool B behind Rita Jones of Wales. Anderson shared the bronze medal with Norma Shaw of England, who finished second in pool A, earning the first Commonwealth Games medal for Norfolk Island.

== 2002 Commonwealth Games ==
Seventy-nine-year-old bowler Joyce Dyer was the oldest competitor at the Games in Manchester, part of a twenty-five member Norfolk Island contingent.

== 2010 Commonwealth Games ==
At Delhi, India, the athletes consisted of 13 men and 9 women; 9 competed in bowls, 5 in archery, and 4 each in squash and shooting.

== 2018 Commonwealth Games ==
At the Gold Coast, Queensland, Australia, Ryan Dixon, Hadyn Evans and Phillip Jones won the country's second Commonwealth Games medal, bronze in the men's triples lawn bowls event.

== 2022 Commonwealth Games ==
Norfolk Island's contingent to the Games in Birmingham consisted of five men and five women competing in one sport: bowls.

In the four men's events, Norfolk Island representatives were eliminated at the group stage. In men's triples, they lost all three matches, while the rest only recorded one win in the group stage. In the women's events, only the triples were eliminated at the group stage, with one win and two losses. Shae Wilson and Carmen Anderson lost to Australia in the pairs quarter-finals, and the fours lost to India in the quarter-finals. In the singles, Wilson reached the semi-finals, but lost to Ellen Ryan of Australia. In the bronze medal match, she lost to Siti Zalina Ahmad of Malaysia.

== 2026 Commonwealth Games ==
In Glasgow, Scotland, Norfolk Island claimed its third medal when Shae Wilson in the women's singles bowls event, defeating Emma Firyana Saroji of Malaysia 2-0.

== Overall medal tally ==
Games	Gold	Silver	Bronze	Total
1986 Edinburgh	0	0	0	0
1990 Auckland	0	0	0	0
1994 Victoria	0	0	1	1
1998 Kuala Lumpur	0	0	0	0
2002 Manchester	0	0	0	0
2006 Melbourne	0	0	0	0
2010 Delhi	0	0	0	0
2014 Glasgow	0	0	0	0
2018 Gold Coast	0	0	1	1
2022 Birmingham	0	0	0	0
2026 Glasgow	0	0	1	1
Total	0	0	3	3

== See also ==
- Sport in Norfolk Island
