= Malaysia at the 2022 Commonwealth Games =

- Flag of Malaysia
- CG code: MAS
- CGA: Olympic Council of Malaysia
- Website: olympic.org.my

in Birmingham, England 28 July 2022 – 8 August 2022
- Competitors: 104 (67 men and 37 women) in 16 sports
- Flag bearers (opening): Bonnie Bunyau Gustin; Aifa Azman
- Flag bearers (closing): Russel Taib; Gabriel Gilbert Daim
- Medals Ranked 10th: Gold 7 Silver 8 Bronze 8 Total 23

Commonwealth Games appearances (overview)
- 1950; 1954; 1958; 1962; 1966; 1970; 1974; 1978; 1982; 1986; 1990; 1994; 1998; 2002; 2006; 2010; 2014; 2018; 2022; 2026; 2030

Other related appearances
- British North Borneo (1958, 1962); Sarawak (1958, 1962)

Malaysia competed at the 2022 Commonwealth Games in Birmingham, England, from 28 July to 8 August 2022. It is Malaysia's 14th appearance at the Commonwealth Games.

Powerlifter Bonnie Bunyau Gustin and squash athlete Aifa Azman were the country's opening ceremony flagbearers.

== Background ==
=== Preparations ===
Shahrul Zaman Yahya was appointed as the chef-de-mission of the delegation on 25 September 2021 during the 198th Olympic Council of Malaysia (OCM) Executive Council meeting which was held on virtual basis.

On 29 December 2021, the OCM Selection Committee under the Chairmanship of OCM President Tan Sri Dato’ Sri Norza Zakaria held a meeting to discuss the selection criteria for the 2022 Commonwealth Games and decided that:

- For Category A, athletes and teams will have to be in the top 4;
- For Category B, athletes and teams will have to be in the top 8 (reduced from top 16 due to tightened criteria); And,
- The Committee will utilise competitions from 2018 to May 2022, including 2021 Southeast Asian Games as basis for selection.

On 14 June 2022, in a selection committee meeting, the OCM initially set a seven-gold medal target for the contingent and chose Bonnie Bunyau Gustin and Sivasangari Subramaniam as flag bearers. However, Sivasangari had to withdraw after she was involved in a road accident. Aifa Azman was announced as Sivasangari's replacement. The gold medal target for the contingent was reduced to six on 19 July 2022 after taking into consideration the personal records and current status of the national athletes. The Malaysian delegation managed to win seven golds, eight silvers and eight bronzes, equalling the achievement of seven golds, five silvers and 12 bronzes at the 2018 edition and surpassing the six-gold target, as well as improving its position from 12th to 10th place.

During the opening ceremony, the Malaysian delegation was represented by 40 athletes and officials wearing white five-button baju Melayu and short modern kebaya featuring the national flower - hibiscus with a hand-painted batik-like abstract interpretation by a local designer.

Russel Taib and Gilbert Daim were the flag bearers at the closing ceremony.

=== Broadcasters ===
Name	Type	Ref
Astro	Pay and over-the-top	
RTM (via ABU)	Free-to-air and over-the-top	

== Medalists ==
Medal	Name	Sport	Event	Date
1st place, gold medalist(s)	Aniq Kasdan	Weightlifting	Men's 55 kg	30 July 2022
1st place, gold medalist(s)	Aznil Bidin	Weightlifting	Men's 61 kg	30 July 2022
1st place, gold medalist(s)	Ng Tze Yong; Aaron Chia; Soh Wooi Yik; Chan Peng Soon; Tan Kian Meng; Goh Jin Wei; Pearly Tan; Thinaah Muralitharan; Cheah Yee See; Lai Pei Jing	Badminton	Mixed team	2 August 2022
1st place, gold medalist(s)	Bonnie Bunyau Gustin	Para powerlifting	Men's lightweight	4 August 2022
1st place, gold medalist(s)	Ng Joe Ee	Gymnastics	Ball	6 August 2022
1st place, gold medalist(s)	Ng Joe Ee	Gymnastics	Ribbon	6 August 2022
1st place, gold medalist(s)	Pearly Tan; Thinaah Muralitharan	Badminton	Women's doubles	8 August 2022
2nd place, silver medalist(s)	Muhammad Erry Hidayat	Weightlifting	Men's 73 kg	31 July 2022
2nd place, silver medalist(s)	Tee Ai Xin; Karen Lyne; Alice Chang; Ho Ying	Table tennis	Women's team	1 August 2022
2nd place, silver medalist(s)	Muhammad Syafiq Puteh; Gabriel Gilbert Daim	Diving	Men's synchronised 3 metre springboard	5 August 2022
2nd place, silver medalist(s)	Azlina Arshad; Syafiqa Rahman; Nur Tarmizi	Lawn bowls	Women's triples	5 August 2022
2nd place, silver medalist(s)	Ng Yan Yee; Nur Dhabitah Sabri	Diving	Women's synchronised 3 metre springboard	6 August 2022
2nd place, silver medalist(s)	Nur Dhabitah Sabri	Diving	Women's 3 metre springboard	7 August 2022
2nd place, silver medalist(s)	Javen Choong; Karen Lyne	Table tennis	Mixed doubles	7 August 2022
2nd place, silver medalist(s)	Ng Tze Yong	Badminton	Men's singles	8 August 2022
3rd place, bronze medalist(s)	Shah Firdaus Sahrom	Cycling	Men's keirin	30 July 2022
3rd place, bronze medalist(s)	Siti Zalina Ahmad	Lawn bowls	Women's singles	1 August 2022
3rd place, bronze medalist(s)	Amir Daniel Abdul Majeed	Judo	Men's –73 kg	2 August 2022
3rd place, bronze medalist(s)	Izzah Amzan	Gymnastics	Clubs	6 August 2022
3rd place, bronze medalist(s)	Tan Kian Meng; Lai Pei Jing	Badminton	Mixed doubles	7 August 2022
3rd place, bronze medalist(s)	Aaron Chia; Soh Wooi Yik	Badminton	Men's doubles	7 August 2022
3rd place, bronze medalist(s)	Rachel Arnold; Aifa Azman	Squash	Women's doubles	8 August 2022
3rd place, bronze medalist(s)	Muhammad Syafiq Puteh; Nur Dhabitah Sabri	Diving	Mixed synchronised 3 metre springboard	8 August 2022

Medals by sport
Sport	gold	silver	bronze	Total
Badminton	2	1	2	5
Cycling	0	0	1	1
Diving	0	3	1	4
Gymnastics	2	0	1	3
Judo	0	0	1	1
Lawn bowls	0	1	1	2
Para powerlifting	1	0	0	1
Squash	0	0	1	1
Table tennis	0	2	0	2
Weightlifting	2	1	0	3
Total	7	8	8	23

Medals by gender
Gender	1st place, gold medalist(s)	2nd place, silver medalist(s)	3rd place, bronze medalist(s)	Total
Male	3	3	3	9
Female	3	4	3	10
Mixed	1	1	2	4
Total	7	8	8	23

Medals by date
Day	Date	Gold medal	Silver medal	Bronze medal	Total
Day 1	29 Jul	0	0	0	0
Day 2	30 Jul	2	0	1	3
Day 3	31 Jul	0	1	0	1
Day 4	1 Aug	0	1	1	2
Day 5	2 Aug	1	0	1	2
Day 6	3 Aug	0	0	0	0
Day 7	4 Aug	1	0	0	1
Day 8	5 Aug	0	2	0	2
Day 9	6 Aug	2	1	1	4
Day 10	7 Aug	0	2	2	4
Day 11	8 Aug	1	1	2	4
Total		7	8	8	23

== Competitors ==
Malaysia received a quota of 92 open allocation slots from Commonwealth Sport. This quota is used to determine the overall team in sports lacking a qualifying system. A total of 107 competitors are set to compete in the Games.

The following is the list of number of competitors participating at the Games per sport/discipline.

Sport	Men	Women	Total
Athletics	6	2	8
Badminton	5	5	10
3x3 basketball	4	0	4
Boxing	2	0	2
Cycling	3	3	6
Diving	7	5	12
Gymnastics	1	4	5
Judo	1	1	2
Lawn bowls	5	5	10
Para powerlifting	1	0	1
Rugby sevens	13	0	13
Squash	5	4	9
Swimming	3	1	4
Table tennis	5	5	10
Triathlon	1	0	1
Weightlifting	5	2	7
Total	67	37	104

== Athletics ==
A squad of seven athletes was confirmed as of 13 July 2022.

Men
Track and road events

Athlete	Event	Heat		Semifinal		Final	
Athlete	Event	Result	Rank	Result	Rank	Result	Rank
Afiq Hanafiah	100 m T12	11.29	4 Q	—N/a		11.10	4
Russel Taib	200 m	21.13	2 Q	21.32	6	did not advance	

Field events

Athlete	Event	Qualification		Final	
Athlete	Event	Distance	Rank	Distance	Rank
Nauraj Singh Randhawa	High jump	—N/a		2.05	13
Andre Anura	Triple jump	—N/a		NM	―
Irfan Shamshuddin	Discus throw	57.93	10 Q	59.53	9
Jackie Wong	Hammer throw	—N/a		61.40	14

Women
Track and road events

Athlete	Event	Heat		Semifinal		Final	
Athlete	Event	Result	Rank	Result	Rank	Result	Rank
Shereen Vallabouy	400 m	53.92	18	did not advance			

Field events

Athlete	Event	Qualification		Final	
Athlete	Event	Distance	Rank	Distance	Rank
Grace Wong	Hammer throw	59.53	12 Q	61.30	10

== Badminton ==
As of 1 June 2022, Malaysia qualified for the mixed team event via the BWF World Rankings. A full squad of ten players was revealed on 18 June 2022. However, Lee Zii Jia announced his withdrawal from the squad on 23 June 2022 to focus on the World Championships. Ng Tze Yong was then announced as Lee's replacement.

Singles

Athlete	Event	Round of 64	Round of 32	Round of 16	Quarterfinal	Semifinal	Final / BM	
Athlete	Event	Opposition Score	Opposition Score	Opposition Score	Opposition Score	Opposition Score	Opposition Score	Rank
Ng Tze Yong	Men's singles	Bye	M I S Bhatti (PAK); W (21–10, 21–9)	A Rasheed (MDV); W (21–7, 21–9)	KY Loh (SGP); W (15–21, 21–14, 21–11)	S Kidambi (IND); W (13–21, 21–19, 21–10)	L Sen (IND); L (21–19, 9–21, 16–21)	2nd place, silver medalist(s)
Goh Jin Wei	Women's singles	Bye	C Tornyenyor (GHA); W (21–3, 21–1)	T Williams (BAR); W (W/O)	P. V. Sindhu (IND); L (21–19, 14–21, 18–21)	did not advance		

Doubles

Athlete	Event	Round of 64	Round of 32	Round of 16	Quarterfinal	Semifinal	Final / BM	
Athlete	Event	Opposition Score	Opposition Score	Opposition Score	Opposition Score	Opposition Score	Opposition Score	Rank
Chan Peng Soon; Tan Kian Meng	Men's doubles	—N/a	A Lubah & J Paul (MRI); W (21–12, 21–11)	A Dunn & A Hall (SCO); W (18–21, 25–23, 21–15)	S Dias & B Goonethilleka (SRI); W (21–16, 21–12)	S Rankireddy & C Shetty (IND); L (6–21, 15–21)	A Chia & WY Soh (MAS); L (19–21, 21–11, 11–21)	4
Aaron Chia; Soh Wooi Yik	Men's doubles	—N/a	Bye	M Grimley & C Grimley (SCO); W (21–19, 21–16)	B Kasirye & D Wanagaliya (UGA); W (21–6, 21–12)	B Lane & S Vendy (ENG); L (21–18, 17–21, 4–21)	PS Chan & KM Tan (MAS); W (21–19, 11–21, 21–11)	3rd place, bronze medalist(s)
Pearly Tan; Thinaah Muralitharan	Women's doubles	—N/a	Bye	D Laurens Jordaan & J Scholtz (RSA); W (21–6, 21–4)	YJ Jin & C Wong (SGP); W (21–15, 11–21, 21–15)	T Jolly & G Gopichand (IND); W (21–13, 21–16)	C Birch & L Smith (ENG); W (21–5, 21–8)	1st place, gold medalist(s)
Cheah Yee See; Lai Pei Jing	Women's doubles	—N/a	S Scott & T Williams (BAR); W (21–2, 21–1)	C Birch & L Smith (ENG); L (19–21, 16–21)	did not advance			
Tan Kian Meng; Lai Pei Jing	Mixed doubles	Bye	T Pultoo & G Mungrah (MRI); W (21–5, 21–6)	YX Lin & G Somerville (AUS); W (21–10, 21–11)	C Hemming & J Pugh (ENG); W (22–20, 21–11)	T Hee & WH Tan (SGP); L (23–25, 18–21)	A Hall & J MacPherson (SCO); W (21–15, 21–17)	3rd place, bronze medalist(s)
Chan Peng Soon; Cheah Yee See	Mixed doubles	Bye	A Kwek & YJ Jin (SGP); W (21–8, 21–13)	J Yu & K Ea (AUS); W (21–16, 21–12)	A Hall & J MacPherson (SCO); L (15–21, 19–21)	did not advance		

Mixed team

Summary

Team	Event	Group stage				Quarterfinal	Semifinal	Final / BM	
Team	Event	Opposition Score	Opposition Score	Opposition Score	Rank	Opposition Score	Opposition Score	Opposition Score	Rank
Malaysia	Mixed team	Zambia; W 5–0	Jamaica; W 5–0	South Africa; W 5–0	1 Q	Sri Lanka; W 3–0	England; W 3–0	India; W 3–1	1st place, gold medalist(s)

Squad

- Ng Tze Yong
- Aaron Chia
- Soh Wooi Yik
- Chan Peng Soon
- Tan Kian Meng
- Goh Jin Wei
- Pearly Tan
- Thinaah Muralitharan
- Cheah Yee See
- Lai Pei Jing

Group stage

Pos	Team	Pld	W	L	MF	MA	MD	GF	GA	GD	PF	PA	PD	Pts	Qualification
1	Malaysia	3	3	0	15	0	+15	30	0	+30	630	228	+402	3	Knockout stage
2	South Africa	3	2	1	7	8	−1	15	17	−2	509	540	−31	2	Knockout stage
3	Jamaica	3	1	2	6	9	−3	12	18	−6	457	546	−89	1	
4	Zambia	3	0	3	2	13	−11	5	27	−22	368	650	−282	0	

Source: BWF

Malaysia
5
National Exhibition Centre, Court 4
29 July 2022, 09:00 UTC+1

Zambia
0

			1	2	3
1	(Malaysia) (Zambia)	Tan Kian Meng / Lai Pei Jing; Kalombo Mulenga / Ogar Siamupangila	21; 6	21; 3
2	(Malaysia) (Zambia)	Ng Tze Yong; Chongo Mulenga	21; 9	21; 8
3	(Malaysia) (Zambia)	Goh Jin Wei; Elizaberth Chipeleme	21; 1	21; 2
4	(Malaysia) (Zambia)	Aaron Chia / Soh Wooi Yik; Kalombo Mulenga / Chongo Mulenga	21; 13	21; 9
5	(Malaysia) (Zambia)	Pearly Tan / Thinaah Muralitharan; Ogar Siamupangila / Elizaberth Chipeleme	21; 3	21; 5

Malaysia
5
National Exhibition Centre, Court 1
29 July 2022, 19:00 UTC+1

Jamaica
0

			1	2	3
1	(Malaysia) (Jamaica)	Chan Peng Soon / Cheah Yee See; Joel Angus / Katherine Wynter	21; 5	21; 12
2	(Malaysia) (Jamaica)	Ng Tze Yong; Samuel Ricketts	21; 12	21; 16
3	(Malaysia) (Jamaica)	Goh Jin Wei; Tahlia Richardson	21; 2	21; 5
4	(Malaysia) (Jamaica)	Aaron Chia / Soh Wooi Yik; Joel Angus / Samuel Ricketts	21; 7	21; 11
5	(Malaysia) (Jamaica)	Pearly Tan / Thinaah Muralitharan; Tahlia Richardson / Katherine Wynter	21; 8	21; 2

Malaysia
5
National Exhibition Centre, Court 2
30 July 2022, 14:00 UTC+1

South Africa
0

			1	2	3
1	(Malaysia) (South Africa)	Aaron Chia / Pearly Tan; Jarred Elliot / Deidre Laurens Jordaan	21; 7	21; 8
2	(Malaysia) (South Africa)	Ng Tze Yong; Carden Kakora	21; 11	21; 8
3	(Malaysia) (South Africa)	Goh Jin Wei; Johanita Scholtz	21; 5	21; 4
4	(Malaysia) (South Africa)	Tan Kian Meng / Chan Peng Soon; Jarred Elliot / Robert Summers	21; 6	21; 9
5	(Malaysia) (South Africa)	Lai Pei Jing / Cheah Yee See; Deidre Laurens Jordaan / Johanita Scholtz	21; 18	21; 13

Quarterfinal

Malaysia
3
National Exhibition Centre, Court 2
31 July 2022, 11:00 UTC+1

Sri Lanka
0

			1	2	3
1	(Malaysia) (Sri Lanka)	Tan Kian Meng / Lai Pei Jing; Sachin Dias / Thilini Hendahewa	21; 14	21; 14
2	(Malaysia) (Sri Lanka)	Ng Tze Yong; Niluka Karunaratne	21; 5	21; 14
3	(Malaysia) (Sri Lanka)	Goh Jin Wei; Suhasni Vidanage	21; 9	21; 5
4	(Malaysia) (Sri Lanka)	Aaron Chia / Soh Wooi Yik; Sachin Dias / Dumindu Abeywickrama				not played
5	(Malaysia) (Sri Lanka)	Pearly Tan / Thinaah Muralitharan; Suhasni Vidanage / Thilini Hendahewa				not played

Semifinal

Malaysia
3
National Exhibition Centre, Court 1
1 August 2022, 11:00 UTC+1

England
0

			1	2	3
1	(Malaysia) (England)	Chan Peng Soon / Cheah Yee See; Marcus Ellis / Lauren Smith	12; 21	21; 18	21; 13
2	(Malaysia) (England)	Ng Tze Yong; Toby Penty	21; 13	21; 14
3	(Malaysia) (England)	Aaron Chia / Soh Wooi Yik; Ben Lane / Sean Vendy	21; 17	21; 18
4	(Malaysia) (England)	Goh Jin Wei; Freya Patel-Redfearn				not played
5	(Malaysia) (England)	Pearly Tan / Thinaah Muralitharan; Chloe Birch / Lauren Smith				not played

Final

Malaysia
3
National Exhibition Centre, Court 1
2 August 2022, 17:30 UTC+1

India
1

			1	2	3
1	(Malaysia) (India)	Aaron Chia / Soh Wooi Yik; Satwiksairaj Rankireddy / Chirag Shetty	21; 18	21; 15
2	(Malaysia) (India)	Goh Jin Wei; P. V. Sindhu	20; 22	17; 21
3	(Malaysia) (India)	Ng Tze Yong; Srikanth Kidambi	21; 19	6; 21	21; 16
4	(Malaysia) (India)	Pearly Tan / Thinaah Muralitharan; Treesa Jolly / Gayatri Gopichand	21; 18	21; 17
5	(Malaysia) (India)	Tan Kian Meng / Lai Pei Jing; Satwiksairaj Rankireddy / Ashwini Ponnappa				not played

== 3x3 basketball ==
As of 19 May 2022, Malaysia accepted a Bipartite Invitation for the men's wheelchair tournament.

Summary

Team	Event	Preliminary round			Semifinal	Final / BM / PM	
Team	Event	Opposition Result	Opposition Result	Rank	Opposition Result	Opposition Result	Rank
Malaysia wheelchair men	Men's wheelchair tournament	England; L 9–19	South Africa; W 13–6	2 Q	Canada; L 9–14	England; L 11–21	4

=== Men's wheelchair ===
Roster

- Ahmad Nazri Hamzah
- Muhammad Roozaimi Johari
- Muhamad Atib Zakaria
- Freday Tan Yei Bing

Group A

Pos	Team	Pld	W	L	PF	PA	PD	Qualification
1	England (H)	2	2	0	38	11	+27	Semi-finals
2	Malaysia	2	1	1	22	25	−3	Semi-finals
3	South Africa	2	0	2	8	30	−22	5th place match

Source: Birmingham 2022
Rules for classification: 1) Wins; 2) Head-to-head record; 3) Points scored.
(H) Hosts

30 July 2022
15:30

Report

Malaysia	9–19	England
Pts: Zakaria 5		Pts: Manning 9

Smithfield

31 July 2022
15:30

Report

South Africa	6–13	Malaysia
Pts: Dumond 3		Pts: Hamzah 5

Smithfield

Semifinal

1 August 2022
19:30

Report

Canada	14–9	Malaysia
Pts: Hedges 5		Pts: Johari, Tan Yei Bing 3

Smithfield

Bronze medal match

2 August 2022
15:00

Report

England	21–11	Malaysia
Pts: McIntyre 8		Pts: Zakaria 6

Smithfield

== Boxing ==
As of 30 June 2022, two boxers will take part in the competition.

Men

Athlete	Event	Round of 16	Quarterfinals	Semifinals	Final	
Athlete	Event	Opposition Result	Opposition Result	Opposition Result	Opposition Result	Rank
Qaiyum Ariffin	Flyweight	O R Mahommed (BOT); L 0–5	did not advance			
Imdad Ahmad Shaharom	Bantamweight	M McHale (SCO); L RSC	did not advance			

== Cycling ==
As of 4 July 2022, six cyclists will take part in the competition.

=== Track ===
Sprint

Athlete	Event	Qualification		Round 1	Quarterfinals	Semifinals	Final	
Athlete	Event	Time	Rank	Opposition Time	Opposition Time	Opposition Time	Opposition Time	Rank
Fadhil Zonis	Men's sprint	10.310	21	did not advance				
Ridwan Sahrom	Men's sprint	10.226	20	did not advance				
Shah Firdaus Sahrom	Men's sprint	9.848	7 Q	1 Q	2	did not advance		
Shah Firdaus Sahrom; Ridwan Sahrom; Fadhil Zonis	Men's team sprint	44.496	5	—N/a			did not advance	
Nurul Aliana Syafika Azizan	Women's sprint	11.990	24	did not advance				
Nurul Izzah	Women's sprint	11.681	22	did not advance				
Anis Amira Rosidi	Women's sprint	11.302	18	did not advance				
Nurul Izzah; Nurul Aliana Syafika Azizan; Anis Amira Rosidi	Women's team sprint	REL		—N/a			did not advance	

Keirin

Athlete	Event	1st round	Repechage	Semifinals	Final
Athlete	Event	Rank	Rank	Rank	Rank
Fadhil Zonis	Men's keirin	5 R	3	did not advance	
Ridwan Sahrom	Men's keirin	5 R	3	did not advance	
Shah Firdaus Sahrom	Men's keirin	1 Q	Bye	1 Q	3rd place, bronze medalist(s)
Nurul Aliana Syafika Azizan	Women's keirin	DNS			
Nurul Izzah	Women's keirin	5 R	3	did not advance	
Anis Amira Rosidi	Women's keirin	4 R	2	did not advance	

Time trial

Athlete	Event	Time	Rank
Fadhil Zonis	Men's time trial	1:01.734	10
Ridwan Sahrom	Men's time trial	1:03.093	14
Nurul Aliana Syafika Azizan	Women's time trial	DNS	
Nurul Izzah	Women's time trial	35.871	16
Anis Amira Rosidi	Women's time trial	35.503	15

== Diving ==
A squad of twelve divers was confirmed as of 11 July 2022.

Men

Athlete	Events	Preliminary		Final	
Athlete	Events	Points	Rank	Points	Rank
Ooi Tze Liang	3 m springboard	394.85	6 Q	427.70	7
Bertrand Rhodict	10 m platform	396.60	6 Q	419.60	6
Hanis Jaya Surya	10 m platform	300.90	14	did not advance	
Chew Yiwei; Ooi Tze Liang	3 m synchronised springboard	—N/a		366.09	5
Muhammad Syafiq Puteh; Gabriel Gilbert Daim	3 m synchronised springboard	—N/a		376.77	2nd place, silver medalist(s)
Jellson Jabillin; Hanis Jaya Surya	10 m synchronised platform	—N/a		365.64	5

Women

Athlete	Events	Preliminary		Final	
Athlete	Events	Points	Rank	Points	Rank
Kimberly Bong	1 m springboard	204.75	12 Q	225.00	11
Ong Ker Ying	1 m springboard	207.50	10 Q	206.80	12
Ong Ker Ying	3 m springboard	257.70	10 Q	231.60	12
Nur Dhabitah Sabri	3 m springboard	276.25	6 Q	330.90	2nd place, silver medalist(s)
Pandelela Rinong	10 m platform	283.50	7 Q	260.90	11
Nur Dhabitah Sabri; Ng Yan Yee	3 m synchronised springboard	—N/a		299.85	2nd place, silver medalist(s)
Pandelela Rinong; Nur Dhabitah Sabri	10 m synchronised platform	—N/a		286.92	4

Mixed

Athlete	Events	Final	
Athlete	Events	Points	Rank
Ng Yan Yee; Muhammad Syafiq Puteh	3 m synchronised springboard	273.06	7
Nur Dhabitah Sabri; Gabriel Gilbert Daim	3 m synchronised springboard	299.04	3rd place, bronze medalist(s)
Pandelela Rinong; Jellson Jabillin	10 m synchronised platform	302.82	4

== Gymnastics ==
As of 20 June 2022, three gymnasts will take part in the competition.

=== Artistic ===
Men
Individual Qualification

Athlete	Event	Apparatus						Total	Rank
Athlete	Event	F	PH	R	V	PB	HB	Total	Rank
Sharul Aimy	Qualification	10.900	12.000	—N/a	13.950 Q	—N/a	—N/a		

Individual Finals

Athlete	Apparatus	Score	Rank
Sharul Aimy	Vault	13.699	7

Women
Individual Qualification

Athlete	Event	Apparatus				Total	Rank
Athlete	Event	V	UB	BB	F	Total	Rank
Rachel Yeoh Li Wen	Qualification	—N/a	11.800	—N/a	—N/a		

=== Rhythmic ===
Team Final & Individual Qualification

Athlete	Event	Apparatus				Total	Rank
Athlete	Event	Hoop	Ball	Clubs	Ribbon	Total	Rank
Koi Sie Yan	Team	26.700	25.900	~~23.950~~	25.750 Q	102.300	15
Ng Joe Ee	Team	24.600	28.600 Q	~~23.100~~	28.000 Q	104.300 Q	9
Izzah Amzan	Team	27.500 Q	26.800	27.100 Q	24.300	105.700 Q	5
Total	Team	78.800	81.300	27.100	78.050	265.250	4

Individual Finals

Athlete	Event	Apparatus				Total	Rank
Athlete	Event	Hoop	Ball	Clubs	Ribbon	Total	Rank
Ng Joe Ee	All-around	26.700	27.700	26.700	27.100	108.200	5
Izzah Amzan	All-around	26.100	27.600	28.200	26.400	108.300	4

Athlete	Apparatus	Score	Rank
Izzah Amzan	Hoop	25.700	7
Ng Joe Ee	Ball	29.700	1st place, gold medalist(s)
Izzah Amzan	Clubs	28.600	3rd place, bronze medalist(s)
Ng Joe Ee	Ribbon	27.800	1st place, gold medalist(s)
Koi Sie Yan	Ribbon	27.200	4

== Judo ==
Malaysia entered two judoka (one man and one woman) into the Commonwealth tournament.

Athlete	Event	Round of 32	Round of 16	Quarterfinals	Semifinals	Rephecage	Final/BM	
Athlete	Event	Opposition Result	Opposition Result	Opposition Result	Opposition Result	Opposition Result	Opposition Result	Rank
Amir Daniel Abdul Majeed	Men's –73 kg	W Tai Tin (SAM); W 10–0	J Bensted (AUS); L 0s3–10s1	—N/a		N Matos (MOZ); W 10–0	D Matsoukatov (CYP); W 10–0	3rd place, bronze medalist(s)
Kamini Sri Segaran	Women's –57 kg	M Wilson (SCO); L 0s1–10	did not advance					

== Lawn bowls ==
Men

Athlete	Event	Group Stage					Quarterfinal	Semifinal	Final / BM	
Athlete	Event	Opposition Score	Opposition Score	Opposition Score	Opposition Score	Rank	Opposition Score	Opposition Score	Opposition Score	Rank
Fairul Muin	Singles	R Simpson (JAM); W 21–4	S Naiseruvati (FIJ); W 21–14	Olivier (NAM); L 12-21	Walker (ENG); W 21-8	1 Q	Davis (JEY); W 21–12	Kelly (NIR); L 15-21	McLean (SCO); L 11-21	4
Idham Ramlan; Fairul Muin	Pairs	India (IND); W 17–14	England (ENG); L 10–21	Falkland Islands (FLK); W 35–6	Cook Islands (COK); W 19–15	3	did not advance			
Izzat Dzulkeple; Soufi Rusli; Syamil Ramli	Triples	England (ENG); L 13–12	Canada (CAN); W 15–14	South Africa (RSA); L 12–17	—N/a	2 Q	Australia (AUS); L 14–24	did not advance		
Izzat Dzulkeple; Soufi Rusli; Syamil Ramli; Idham Ramlan	Fours	Brunei (BRU); W 21–8	Norfolk Islands (NFK); W 19–11	Wales (WAL); D 12-12	—N/a	2 Q	England (ENG); L 10–16	did not advance		

Women

Athlete	Event	Group Stage					Quarterfinal	Semifinal	Final / BM	
Athlete	Event	Opposition Score	Opposition Score	Opposition Score	Opposition Score	Rank	Opposition Score	Opposition Score	Opposition Score	Rank
Siti Zalina Ahmad	Singles	O E Buckingham (NIU); W 21–7	A Pharaoh (ENG); W 21–11	S Lim (SGP); W 21–17	K Inch (NZL); W 21–20	1 Q	N Mataio (COK); W 21–14	L Beere (GGY); L 15–21	S Wilson (NFK); W 21–10	3rd place, bronze medalist(s)
Siti Zalina Ahmad; Emma Saroji	Pairs	Guernsey (GGY); W 22–18	Cook Islands (COK); W 22–6	Malta (MLT); W 20–16	Norfolk Islands (NFK); L 17-22	1 Q	Northern Ireland (NIR); W 15–11	Australia (AUS); L 10-13	New Zealand (NZL); L 15-20	4
Azlina Arshad; Syafiqa Rahman; Nur Tarmizi	Triples	Fiji (FIJ); L 14–17	Norfolk Islands (NFK); W 24–8	Canada (CAN); W 18–17	—N/a	1 Q	Wales (WAL); W 25-22	New Zealand (NZL); W 16–9	England (ENG); L 9-17	2nd place, silver medalist(s)
Emma Saroji; Azlina Arshad; Syafiqa Rahman; Nur Tarmizi	Fours	Norfolk Islands (NFK); L 12–21	Northern Ireland (NIR); L 10–13	Malta (MLT); W 22–6	—N/a	3	did not advance			

== Para powerlifting ==
Athlete	Event	Result	Rank
Bonnie Bunyau Gustin	Men's lightweight	154.60 GR	1st place, gold medalist(s)

== Rugby sevens ==
As of 28 November 2021, Malaysia qualified for the men's tournament. This was achieved through their position in the 2021 Asia Rugby Sevens Series.

The fifteen-man roster was officially named as of 9 July 2022. It was later reduced to 13 athletes.

Summary

Team	Event	Preliminary Round				Quarterfinal / CQ	Semifinal / CS	Final / BM / CF	
Team	Event	Opposition Result	Opposition Result	Opposition Result	Rank	Opposition Result	Opposition Result	Opposition Result	Rank
Malaysia men's	Men's tournament	South Africa (RSA); L 0–46	Scotland (SCO); L 12–50	Tonga (TGA); L 7–31	4	Wales (WAL); L 14–33	Jamaica (JAM); L 7–28	Did not advance	15

=== Men's tournament ===
Roster

- Ameer Nasrun Zulkefli
- Kamal Hamidi
- Shah Izwan Nordin
- Wan Azley Wan Omar
- Azizul Hakim Che Oon
- Safiy Md Said
- Azwan Zuwairi Mat Zizi
- Eddie Ariff Ferdaus Freedy
- Adam Ariff Alias
- Amalul Hazim Nasarrudin
- Daim Zainuddin
- Hafiezie Sudin
- Zulhilmi Azizad

Reserves

- Suhairi Effendi Mohd Othman
- Harith Iqbal

Pool B

Pos	Team	Pld	W	D	L	PF	PA	PD	Pts	Qualification
1	South Africa	3	3	0	0	116	5	+111	9	Advance to Quarter-finals
2	Scotland	3	2	0	1	91	46	+45	7	Advance to Quarter-finals
3	Tonga	3	1	0	2	36	84	−48	5	Advance to classification Quarter-finals
4	Malaysia	3	0	0	3	19	127	−108	3	Advance to classification Quarter-finals

Source: Birmingham2022
Rules for classification: 1) Points; 2) Head-to-head result; 3) Point difference; 4) Points scored.

29 July 2022
11:56

South Africa	46–0	Malaysia
Try: A. Davids (3) 1' m, 6' m, 11' m du Plessis 5' c S. Davids 7' m Soyizwapi 8' c Human 10' m S. Davids 14' c Con: Brown (2/6) 5', 9'; Williams (0/1); Human (1/1) 14'	Report

Coventry Stadium, Coventry
Referee: Tevita Rokovereni (Fiji)

29 July 2022
20:26

Scotland	50–12	Malaysia
Try: Davidson 1' c Jones (2) 2' c, 5' c Coombes 6' m Henry (3) 8' m, 9 m, 10' c Sofolarin 13' c Con: Davidson (5/8) 1', 2', 5', 10', 14'	Report	Try: Mat Zizi 3' c Nasarrudin 7' m Con: Mat Zizi (1/2) 4'

Coventry Stadium, Coventry
Referee: Talal-Azmat Chaudhry (Canada)

30 July 2022
11:56

Tonga	31–7	Malaysia
Try: Asi 1' c Pakalani (2) 3' c, 4 m Vailea 9' c Halafihi 14' m Con: Pakalani (2/3) 1', 3'; Asi (1/2) 10'	Report	Try: Nasarrudin 13' c Con: Said (1/1) 13'

Coventry Stadium, Coventry
Referee: Ben Breakspear (Wales)

Classification Quarterfinals

30 July 2022
18:36

Wales	33–14	Malaysia
Try: C. Williams (3) 4' m, 8' c, 9' c Lewis 13' c Carson 14' c Con: T. Williams (3/4) 8', 9', 13'; Swannack (1/1) 14'	Report	Try: Sudin 2' c Nordin 7' c Con: Mat Zizi (2/2) 2', 7'

Coventry Stadium, Coventry
Referee: Talal-Azmat Chaudhry (Canada)

13-16 Semifinals

31 July 2022
10:30

Jamaica	28–7	Malaysia
Try: Bush 4' c Turner 9' c Caton-Brown (2) 9' c, 13' c Con: Stoppani (2/2) 4', 9'; Adamson (1/1) 10'; Roy-Smith (1/1) 13' c Cards: Adamson (red card) 11'	Report	Try: Nasarrudin 8' c Con: Mat Zizi (1/1) 8'

Coventry Stadium, Coventry
Referee: Finlay Brown (Scotland)

== Squash ==
A squad of nine players was confirmed on 15 June 2022. Sivasangari Subramaniam then had to withdraw due to injuries from a road accident.

Singles

Athlete	Event	Round of 64	Round of 32	Round of 16	Quarterfinals	Semifinals	Final	
Athlete	Event	Opposition Score	Opposition Score	Opposition Score	Opposition Score	Opposition Score	Opposition Score	Rank
Mohd Syafiq Kamal	Men's singles	M Suari (PNG); W 3–0	E Evans (WAL); L 1–3	did not advance				
Ng Eain Yow	Men's singles	Bye	Jason Ray K (GUY); W 3-0	N Sachvie (CAN); W 3–0	J Makin (WAL); L 1–3	did not advance		
Ivan Yuen	Men's singles	K Cumberbatch (BAR); W 3–0	R Dowling (AUS); W 3–1	G Lobban (SCO); L 2–3	did not advance			
Rachel Arnold	Women's singles	—N/a	A Fayyaz (PAK); W 3–0	T Evans (WAL); W 3–0	G Kennedy (ENG); L 0–3	did not advance		
Aifa Azman	Women's singles	—N/a	S Kuruvilla (IND); W 3–0	H Naughton (CAN); L 0–3	did not advance			
Chan Yiwen	Women's singles	—N/a	F Zafar (PAK); W 3-0	Sarah-Jane P (ENG); L 0–3	did not advance			

Doubles

Athlete	Event	Round of 32	Round of 16	Quarterfinals	Semifinals	Final	
Athlete	Event	Opposition Score	Opposition Score	Opposition Score	Opposition Score	Opposition Score	Rank
Ng Eain Yow; Ivan Yuen	Men's doubles	—N/a	L Chileshe; T Chileshe (NZL); W 2–1	V Senthilkumar; A Singh (IND); W 2–0	J Willstrop; D James (ENG); L 1-2	G Lobban; R Stewart (SCO); L 0-2	4
Ong Sai Hung; Mohd Syafiq Kamal	Men's doubles	S Simpson; K Cumberbatch (BAR); W 2–0	D Selby; A Waller (ENG); L 1–2	did not advance			
Rachel Arnold; Aifa Azman	Women's doubles	Bye	F Zaffar; A Fayyaz (PAK); W 2-0	D Lobban; R Grinham (AUS); W 2-1	S Perry; A Waters (ENG); L 1–2	Chan Yw; A Ampandi (MAS); W 2–0	3rd place, bronze medalist(s)
Chan Yiwen; Ainaa Ampandi	Women's doubles	Bye	N Bunyan; H Naughton (CAN); W 2-0	J Chinappa; D P Karthik (IND); W 2-0	J King; A Landers-Murphy (NZL); L 0–2	R Arnold; A Azman (MAS); L 0–2	4
Addeen Idrakie; Ainaa Ampandi	Mixed doubles	T Evans; J Makin (WAL); L 0–2	did not advance				

== Swimming ==
A squad of four swimmers was confirmed as of 12 July 2022.

Men

Athlete	Event	Heat		Semifinal		Final	
Athlete	Event	Time	Rank	Time	Rank	Time	Rank
Arvin Chahal	100 m freestyle	50.84	22	did not advance			
Arvin Chahal	200 m freestyle	1:51.73	22	—N/a		did not advance	
Arvin Chahal	200 m individual medley	2:05.65	14	—N/a		did not advance	
Khiew Hoe Yean	100 m freestyle	50.47	18	did not advance			
Khiew Hoe Yean	200 m freestyle	1:48.85	11	—N/a		did not advance	
Khiew Hoe Yean	400 m freestyle	3:50.03	7 Q	—N/a		3:49.95	6
Khiew Hoe Yean	200 m backstroke	2:02.01	10	—N/a		did not advance	
Bryan Leong	50 m freestyle	23.64	25	did not advance			
Bryan Leong	50 m butterfly	24.50	20	did not advance			
Bryan Leong	100 m butterfly	53.94	13 Q	53.87	13	did not advance	

Women

Athlete	Event	Heat		Semifinal		Final	
Athlete	Event	Time	Rank	Time	Rank	Time	Rank
Phee Jinq En	50 m breaststroke	32.80	14 Q	32.54	13	did not advance	
Phee Jinq En	100 m breaststroke	1:11.32	14 Q	1:11.42	14	did not advance	

== Table tennis ==
As of 11 February 2022, Malaysia qualified for the men's and women's team events via the ITTF World Rankings. Eight players were selected as of 7 July 2022.

Singles

Athletes	Event	Group stage				Round of 32	Round of 16	Quarterfinal	Semifinal	Final / BM	
Athletes	Event	Opposition Score	Opposition Score	Opposition Score	Rank	Opposition Score	Opposition Score	Opposition Score	Opposition Score	Opposition Score	Rank
Javen Choong	Men's singles	E Asante (GHA); W 4–0	J Chauhan (FIJ); W 4–0	—N/a	1 Q	N Lum (AUS); L 0–4	did not advance				
Leong Chee Feng	Men's singles	D A Calderon (LCA); W 4–0	K Watson (JAM); W 4–0	—N/a	1 Q	O Omotayo (NGR); L 3–4	did not advance				
Wong Qi Shen	Men's singles	G Loi (PNG); W 4–0	T Knight (BAR); W 4–0	—N/a	1 Q	L Pitchford (ENG); L 1–4	did not advance				
Chee Chao Ming	Men's singles C8–10	J Stacey (WAL); L 1–3	P Kailis (CYP); W 3–0	T Agunbiade (NGR)	3	—N/a			did not advance		
Ho Ying	Women's singles	L Elliott (SCO); W 4–0	T Mawa (VAN); W 4–0	G Rosi Yee (FIJ); W 4–1	1 Q	Liu Yz (AUS); L 3–4	did not advance				
Karen Lyne	Women's singles	R Plaistow (SCO); W 4–1	C Kwabi (ENG); W 4–3	—N/a	1 Q	S Akula (IND); L 1–4	did not advance				
Tee Ai Xin	Women's singles	J Nangonzi (UGA); W 3–0	M Tsaptsinos (ENG); W 4–3	—N/a	1 Q	Jian Z (SGP); L 0–4	did not advance				
Gloria Wong Sze	Women's singles C6–10	Q Yang (AUS); L 0–3	B S Ravi (IND); W 3–2	F Obazuaye (NGR); L 0–3	3	—N/a			did not advance		

Doubles

Athletes	Event	Round of 64	Round of 32	Round of 16	Quarterfinal	Semifinal	Final / BM	
Athletes	Event	Opposition Score	Opposition Score	Opposition Score	Opposition Score	Opposition Score	Opposition Score	Rank
Lee Yong Yi; Leong Chee Feng	Men's doubles	Bye	C Chew; P S F Ethan (SGP); L 1–3	did not advance				
Javen Choong; Wong Qi Shen	Men's doubles	M Paul; W Zak (NIR); L 2–3	did not advance					
Alice Chang; Tee Ai Xin	Women's doubles	Bye	Fu C N Z Mo (CAN); L 2–3	did not advance				
Ho Ying; Karen Lyne	Women's doubles	K Cynthia; A Millicent (GHA); W 3–0	J Minghyung; Lay J F (AUS); L 2–3	did not advance				
Wong Qi Shen; Tee Ai Xin	Mixed doubles	S Sanil; T Reeth (IND); W 3–2	S Britton; C Edghill (GUY); W 3–0	C Chew; Jian Z (SGP); L 0–3	did not advance			
Ho Ying; Leong Chee Feng	Mixed doubles	J v Lange; T Thuraia (GUY); W 3–0	Brian C Y F O Hosenally (MRI); W 3–0	S Kamal; S Akula (IND); L 1–3	did not advance			
Javen Choong; Karen Lyne	Mixed doubles	Y Xin; Lay J F (AUS); W 3–1	N C Ooka; P D Jayavant (RSA); W 3–0	Fu C N Z Mo (CAN); W 3–2	S Gnanasekaran; M Batran (IND); W 3–2	C Chew; Jian Z (SGP); W 3–1	S Kamal; S Akula (IND); L 1-3	2nd place, silver medalist(s)

Team

Athletes	Event	Group stage				Quarterfinal	Semifinal	Final / BM	
Athletes	Event	Opposition Score	Opposition Score	Opposition Score	Rank	Opposition Score	Opposition Score	Opposition Score	Rank
Chee Feng Leong; Javen Choong; Wong Qi Shen; Lee Yong Yi	Men's team	Australia (AUS); W 3–1	Mauritius (MRI); W 3–0	Canada (CAN); L 1–3	2 Q	Nigeria (NGR); L 2–3	did not advance		
Tee Ai Xin; Karen Lyne; Alice Chang; Ho Ying	Women's team	Australia (AUS); L 0–3	Maldives (MDV); W 3–0	Mauritius (MRI); W 3–0	2 Q	India (IND); W 3–2	Wales (WAL); W 3–2	Singapore (SGP); L 0–3	2nd place, silver medalist(s)

== Triathlon ==
As of 6 July 2022, two triathletes will take part in the competition. However, Chong Xian Hao announced his withdrawal on 23 July 2022 because suffered an injury during a training session.

Individual

Athlete	Event	Swim (750 m)	Trans 1	Bike (20 km)	Trans 2	Run (5 km)	Total	Rank
Isaac Tan	Men's	9:48	1:21	33:02	0:24	18:23	1:02:58	34

== Weightlifting ==
Aniq Kasdan and Aznil Bidin qualified by winning their categories at the 2021 Commonwealth Weightlifting Championships in Tashkent, Uzbekistan. Five others qualified via the IWF Commonwealth Ranking List, which was finalised on 9 March 2022.

Men

Athlete	Event	Weight lifted		Total	Rank
Athlete	Event	Snatch	Clean & jerk	Total	Rank
Aniq Kasdan	55 kg	107	142 GR	249	1st place, gold medalist(s)
Aznil Bidin	61 kg	127 GR	158 GR	285 GR	1st place, gold medalist(s)
Erry Hidayat	73 kg	138	165	303	2nd place, silver medalist(s)
Nasir Roslan	81 kg	135	165	300	7
Hafiz Shamsuddin	109 kg	148	NM	DNF	―

Women

Athlete	Event	Weight lifted		Total	Rank
Athlete	Event	Snatch	Clean & jerk	Total	Rank
Elly Cascandra Engelbert	55 kg	78	96	174	5
Marcetta Marlyne Marcus	59 kg	73	102	175	9

== See also ==
- Malaysia at the 2022 Winter Olympics
