= Norfolk Island at the 2022 Commonwealth Games =

- Flag of Norfolk Island
- CG code: NFK
- CGA: Norfolk Island Amateur Sports and Commonwealth Games Association
- Website: facebook.com/teamnorfolkisland (Facebook)

in Birmingham, England 28 July 2022 – 8 August 2022
- Competitors: 10 (5 men and 5 women) in 1 sport
- Flag bearers (opening): Tim Sheridan; Shae Wilson
- Flag bearer (closing): Ellie Dixon
- Medals: Gold 0 Silver 0 Bronze 0 Total 0

Commonwealth Games appearances (overview)
- 1986; 1990; 1994; 1998; 2002; 2006; 2010; 2014; 2018; 2022; 2026; 2030

Norfolk Island was represented at the 2022 Commonwealth Games in Birmingham, England, United Kingdom by the Norfolk Island Amateur Sports and Commonwealth Games Association.

In total, 10 athletes including five men and five women represented Norfolk Island in one sport: lawn bowls.

Lawn bowlers Tim Sheridan and Shae Wilson were the delegated flagbearers during the opening ceremony.

== Competitors ==
In total, 10 athletes represented Norfolk Islands at the 2022 Commonwealth Games in Birmingham, England, United Kingdom across one sport.

Sport	Men	Women	Total
Lawn bowls	5	5	10
Total	5	5	10

== Lawn bowls ==
In total, 10 Norfolk Islander athletes participated in the lawn bowls events – Ryan Dixon in the men's singles and the men's triples, Tim Sheridan and John Christian in the men's pairs and the men's fours, Trevor Gow and Hadyn Evans in the men's triples and the men's fours, Shae Wilson in the women's singles and the women's pairs, Carmen Anderson in the women's pairs and the women's fours and Christine Jones, Essie Sanchez and Ellie Dixonin the women's triples and the women's fours.

The lawn bowls events took place at Victoria Park in Leamington Spa between 29 July and 6 August 2022.

Norfolk Island had mixed success in the lawn bowls events. In the four men's events, Norfolk Islands representatives were eliminated at the group stage. The men's triples lost all of their matches while the rest only recorded one win in the group stage. In the women's events, only the triples were eliminated at the group stage. Wilson and Anderson lost to Australia in the pairs quarter-finals and, similarly, the fours lost to India in the quarter-finals. In the singles, Wilson reached the semi-finals but lost Ellen Ryan of Australia. In the bronze medal match, she lost to Siti Zalina Ahmad of Malaysia.

Men

Athlete	Event	Group Stage					Quarterfinal	Semifinal	Final / BM	
Athlete	Event	Opposition Score	Opposition Score	Opposition Score	Opposition Score	Rank	Opposition Score	Opposition Score	Opposition Score	Rank
Ryan Dixon	Singles	Kelly (NIR); L 12 - 21	Tagelagi (NIU); W 21 - 13	Bester (CAN); L 8 - 21	Salmon (WAL); L 11 - 21	4	did not advance			
Tim Sheridan; John Christian	Pairs	Jamaica; L 16–17	Northern Ireland; W 20–15	Namibia; L 12–19	Wales; L 16–19	4	did not advance			
Trevor Gow; Hadyn Evans; Ryan Dixon	Triples	Northern Ireland; L 10–24	Fiji; L 12–20	Wales; L 10–31	—N/a	4	did not advance			
John Christian; Trevor Gow; Hadyn Evans; Tim Sheridan	Fours	Wales; L 8―19	Malaysia; L 11―19	Brunei; W 17―4	—N/a	3	did not advance			

Women

Athlete	Event	Group Stage					Quarterfinal	Semifinal	Final / BM	
Athlete	Event	Opposition Score	Opposition Score	Opposition Score	Opposition Score	Rank	Opposition Score	Opposition Score	Opposition Score	Rank
Shae Wilson	Singles	Tikoisuva (FIJ); W 21–16	Mataio (COK); W 21–13	Piketh (RSA); W 21–18	—N/a	1 Q	Daniels (WAL); W 21–11	Ryan (AUS); L 17–21	Ahmad (MAS); L 10–21	4
Shae Wilson; Carmen Anderson	Pairs	Cook Islands; W 26―14	Malta; W 21―18	Guernsey; L 10―20	Malaysia; W 22―17	2 Q	Australia; L 12―19	did not advance		
Christine Jones; Essie Sanchez; Ellie Dixon	Triples	Canada; L 10 - 22	Malaysia; L 8 - 24	Fiji; W 16 - 13	—N/a	4	did not advance			
Christine Jones; Carmen Anderson; Essie Sanchez; Ellie Dixon	Fours	Malaysia; W 21–12	Malta; W 16–12	Northern Ireland; W 17–6	—N/a	1 Q	India; L 9–17	did not advance		
