= Wales at the 2022 Commonwealth Games =

- Flag of Wales
- CG code: WAL
- CGA: Commonwealth Games Wales
- Website: teamwales.cymru/en

in Birmingham, England 28 July 2022 – 8 August 2022
- Competitors: 201 (99 men and 102 women) in 16 sports
- Flag bearers: Geraint Thomas; Tesni Evans
- Medals Ranked 8th: Gold 8 Silver 6 Bronze 14 Total 28

Commonwealth Games appearances (overview)
- 1930; 1934; 1938; 1950; 1954; 1958; 1962; 1966; 1970; 1974; 1978; 1982; 1986; 1990; 1994; 1998; 2002; 2006; 2010; 2014; 2018; 2022; 2026; 2030

Wales competed at the 2022 Commonwealth Games in Birmingham, England, between 28 July and 8 August 2022. Having competed at every Games since their 1930 inauguration, it was Wales' twenty-second appearance.

Geraint Thomas and Tesni Evans served as the delegation's flagbearers during the opening ceremony. Rosie Eccles carried the flag at the closing ceremony.

== Medal tables ==
Wales finished tenth in the medal table, with a total of 28 medals, including 8 golds.

Medal	Name	Sport	Event	Date
Gold	James Ball	Cycling	Men's tandem sprint B	31 July
Gold	Jarrad Breen; Daniel Salmon	Lawn bowls	Men's pairs	2 August
Gold	Olivia Breen	Athletics	Women's 100 metres (T38)	2 August
Gold	Aled Davies	Athletics	Men's discus throw (F44)/(F64)	3 August
Gold	Gemma Frizelle	Gymnastics	Women's rhythmic individual hoop	6 August
Gold	Rosie Eccles	Boxing	Women's light middleweight	7 August
Gold	Joshua Stacey	Table tennis	Men's singles C8–10	7 August
Gold	Ioan Croft	Boxing	Men's welterweight	7 August
Silver	James Ball	Cycling	Men's tandem 1 km time trial B	29 July
Silver	Dominic Coy; Iestyn Harrett; Olivia Mathias; Non Stanford	Triathlon	Mixed relay	31 July
Silver	Natalie Powell	Judo	Women's 78kg	3 August
Silver	Joel Makin	Squash	Men's singles	3 August
Silver	Julie Thomas; Mark Adams; Gordon LLewellyn; John Wilson	Lawn bowls	Mixed pairs B2–3	5 August
Silver	Taylor Bevan	Boxing	Men's light heavyweight	7 August
Bronze	Rhian Edmunds; Emma Finucane; Lowri Thomas	Cycling	Women's team sprint	29 July
Bronze	Emma Finucane	Cycling	Women's sprint	30 July
Bronze	Eluned King	Cycling	Women's points race	31 July
Bronze	Will Roberts	Cycling	Men's scratch race	31 July
Bronze	Medi Harris	Swimming	100 m backstroke women	31 July
Bronze	Lily Rice	Swimming	100 m backstroke women S8	31 July
Bronze	Owain Dando; Ross Owen; Jonathan Tomlinson	Lawn bowls	Men's triples	1 August
Bronze	Jasmine Hacker-Jones	Judo	Women's 63 kg	2 August
Bronze	Harrison Walsh	Athletics	Men's discus throw (F44)/(F64)	3 August
Bronze	Geraint Thomas	Cycling	Men's road time trial	4 August
Bronze	Jake Dodd	Boxing	Men's flyweight	6 August
Bronze	Garan Croft	Boxing	Men's light middleweight	6 August
Bronze	Owain Harris-Allan	Boxing	Men's bantamweight	6 August
Bronze	Charlotte Carey; Anna Hursey	Table tennis	Women's doubles	7 August

Medals by sport
Sport	Gold medal	Silver medal	Bronze medal	Total
Athletics	2	0	1	3
Boxing	2	1	3	6
Cycling	1	1	5	7
Gymnastics	1	0	0	1
Judo	0	1	1	2
Lawn bowls	1	1	1	3
Squash	0	1	0	1
Swimming	0	0	2	2
Table tennis	1	0	1	2
Triathlon	0	1	0	1
Total	8	6	14	28

Medals by date
Date	Gold medal	Silver medal	Bronze medal	Total
29 July	0	1	1	2
30 July	0	0	1	1
31 July	1	1	4	6
1 August	0	0	1	1
2 August	2	0	1	3
3 August	1	2	1	4
4 August	0	0	1	1
5 August	0	1	0	1
6 August	1	0	3	4
7 August	3	1	1	4
Total	8	6	14	28

Medals by gender
Gender	Gold medal	Silver medal	Bronze medal	Total
Male	5	3	7	9
Female	3	1	7	9
Mixed / open	0	2	0	2
Total	8	6	14	28

== Competitors ==
The following is the list of number of competitors participating at the Games per sport/discipline.

Sport	Men	Women	Total
Athletics	11	13	24
Boxing	6	3	9
Cycling	11	13	24 (Note: Plus 3 pilots)
Diving	1	2	3
Gymnastics	5	8	13
Hockey	18	18	36
Judo	3	3	6
Lawn bowls	8	6	14 (Note: Plus 2 directors)
Netball	—N/a	12	12
Rugby sevens	13	0	13
Squash	3	2	5
Swimming	12	8	20
Table tennis	2	5	7
Triathlon	3	3	6 (Note: Plus 1 guide)
Weightlifting	2	5	7
Wrestling	1	1	2
Total	99	102	201

== Athletics ==
A squad of twenty-two athletes and para athletes was officially selected on 8 June 2022. The para athletes all qualified via the World Para Athletics World Rankings (for performances registered between 31 December 2020 and 25 April 2022).

Two more athletes have since been added to the squad.

Men
Track and road events

Athlete	Event	Heat		Semifinal		Final	
Athlete	Event	Result	Rank	Result	Rank	Result	Rank
Jeremiah Azu	100 m	10.35	2 Q	10.15	2 Q	10.19	5
Rhys Jones	100 m T38	—N/a				12.09	6
Joe Brier	400 m	46.84	3 Q	47.50	8	Did not advance	
Piers Copeland	1500 m	3:49.18	7	—N/a		Did not advance	
Jake Heyward	1500 m	3:37.83	3 Q	—N/a		3:31.08	5
Jon Hopkins	3000 m steeplechase	—N/a				9:06.95	9
Dewi Griffiths	Marathon	—N/a				2:17:58	11

Field events

Athlete	Event	Final	
Athlete	Event	Distance	Rank
Harrison Walsh	Discus throw F44/64	54.76	3rd place, bronze medalist(s)
Aled Davies	Discus throw F44/64	51.39	1st place, gold medalist(s)
Osian Jones	Hammer throw	69.15	6
Jac Palmer	Hammer throw	66.63	11

Women
Track and road events

Athlete	Event	Heat		Semifinal		Final	
Athlete	Event	Result	Rank	Result	Rank	Result	Rank
Hannah Brier	100 m	11.48	4 q	11.61	8	Did not advance	
Olivia Breen	100 m T38	13.03	2 Q	—N/a		12.83	(gold)
Hannah Brier	200 m	24.04	2 Q	23.84	6	Did not advance	
Melissa Courtney-Bryant	1500 m	4:14.46	6 q	—N/a		4:10.86	10
Beth Kidger	5000 m	—N/a				15:37.47	13
Jennifer Nesbitt	5000 m	—N/a				15:34.98	12
Natasha Cockram	Marathon	—N/a				2:40:18	12
Clara Evans	Marathon	—N/a				2:38:03	9
Bethan Davies	10,000 m walk	—N/a				45:45.59	6
Heather Lewis	10,000 m walk	—N/a				45:09.19	5

Field events

Athlete	Event	Qualification		Final	
Athlete	Event	Distance	Rank	Distance	Rank
Adele Nicoll	Shot put	17.30	2 q	17.08	8
Julie Rogers	Discus throw F44/64	—N/a		20.57	8
Amber Simpson	Hammer throw	65.67	5 q	66.52	5

Combined events – Heptathlon

Athlete	Event	100H	HJ	SP	200 m	LJ	JT	800 m	Final	Rank
Lauren Evans	Result	13.89	1.72	10.13	25.80	5.61	30.17	2:23.89	5209	7
Lauren Evans	Points	994	879	538	815	732	480	771	5209	7

== Boxing ==
A squad of nine boxers was officially selected on 8 June 2022.

Men

Athlete	Event	Round of 32	Round of 16	Quarterfinals	Semifinals	Final	
Athlete	Event	Opposition Result	Opposition Result	Opposition Result	Opposition Result	Opposition Result	Rank
Jake Dodd	Flyweight	—N/a	Kolobe (LES); W RSC	Paiva (NIR); W RSC	MacDonald (ENG); L RSC	Did not advance	3rd place, bronze medalist(s)
Owain Harris-Allan	Bantamweight	—N/a	Lengola (LES); W 4–1	Chang (PNG); W 5–0	Mensah (GHA); L 0–3	Did not advance	3rd place, bronze medalist(s)
Ioan Croft	Welterweight	Bye	Vadamootoo (MRI); W 5–0	Mbewe (MAW); W RSC	Jolly (SCO); W 4–1	Zimba (ZAM); W 5–0	1st place, gold medalist(s)
Garan Croft	Light middleweight	Bye	Osoba (NGR); W 5–0	Clair (MRI); W 5–0	Walsh (NIR); L 1–4	Did not advance	3rd place, bronze medalist(s)
Haaris Khan	Middleweight	Richardson (ENG); L 0–5	Did not advance				
Taylor Bevan	Light heavyweight	Lye (NZL); W KO	Poutoa (SAM); W RSC	Ennis (JAM); W 5–0	Bowen (ENG); W 5–0	Lazzerini (SCO); L 1–4	2nd place, silver medalist(s)

Women

Athlete	Event	Round of 16	Quarterfinals	Semifinals	Final	
Athlete	Event	Opposition Result	Opposition Result	Opposition Result	Opposition Result	Rank
Helen Jones	Light flyweight	Bye	Nikhat (IND); L 0–5	Did not advance		
Zoe Andrews	Featherweight	Toussaint (ENG); L 1–4	Did not advance			
Rosie Eccles	Light middleweight	Bye	Borgohain (IND); W 3–2	Nugent (NIR); W 5–0	Scott (AUS); W RSC	1st place, gold medalist(s)

== Cycling ==
A squad of twenty-four cyclists and para cyclists (plus three pilots) was officially selected on 8 June 2022. The para cyclists were awarded with quota places earned via the UCI Individual Tandem B Track Para Rankings (for performances registered between 1 January 2021 and 18 April 2022).

The selection of Elinor Barker was particularly notable as she will take part in the road race less than five months after giving birth.

=== Road ===
Men

Athlete	Event	Time	Rank
Owain Doull	Road race	3:37:20	58
Joe Holt	Road race	3:38:11	65
William Roberts	Road race	3:37:08	25
Luke Rowe	Road race	3:37:08	51
Geraint Thomas	Road race	3:28:51	8
Stephen Williams	Road race	Did not finish	
Owain Doull	Time trial	49:05.46	7
Geraint Thomas	Time trial	46:49.73	3rd place, bronze medalist(s)

Women

Athlete	Event	Time	Rank
Elynor Bäckstedt	Road race	2:45:45	38
Elinor Barker	Road race	2:50:03	41
Megan Barker	Road race	Did not finish	
Leah Dixon	Road race	2:44:53	27
Eluned King	Road race	2:44:46	8
Jessica Roberts	Road race	2:44:46	18
Elynor Bäckstedt	Time trial	42:15.16	8
Leah Dixon	Time trial	43:16.80	15
Anna Morris	Time trial	43:22.08	16

=== Track ===
Sprint

Athlete	Event	Qualification		Round of 16	Quarterfinals	Semifinals	Final / BM	
Athlete	Event	Time	Rank	Opposition Time	Opposition Time	Opposition Time	Opposition Time	Rank
James Ball piloted by Matt Rotherham	Men's tandem sprint B	9.851	2 Q	—N/a		Beau Wootton (AUS); W 2–0	Neil Fachie (SCO); W 2–0	1st place, gold medalist(s)
Alex Pope piloted by Steff Lloyd	Men's tandem sprint B	10.401	4 Q	—N/a		Neil Fachie (SCO); L 0–2	Beau Wootton (AUS); L 0–2	4
Rhian Edmunds	Women's sprint	10.933	9 Q	Lowri Thomas (WAL); W	Kelsey Mitchell (CAN); L 0–2	Did not advance		
Emma Finucane	Women's sprint	10.804	4 Q	Lusia Steele (SCO); W	Kristina Clonan (AUS); W 2–1	Kelsey Mitchell (CAN); L 0–2	Sophie Capewell (ENG); W 2–1	3rd place, bronze medalist(s)
Lowri Thomas	Women's sprint	10.888	8 Q	Rhian Edmunds (WAL); L	Did not advance			
Eleanor Coster; Rhian Edmunds; Emma Finucane; Lowri Thomas	Women's team sprint	48.095	3 QB	—N/a			Australia; W	3rd place, bronze medalist(s)

Keirin

Athlete	Event	Round 1	Repechage	Semifinals	Final / MF
Eleanor Coster	Women's keirin	5 R	3	Did not advance	
Rhian Edmunds	Women's keirin	3 R	1 Q	2 Q	6
Emma Finucane	Women's keirin	2 Q	–	3 Q	4

Time trial

Athlete	Event	Time	Rank
Joe Holt	Men's time trial	1:01.422	8
Harvey McNaughton	Men's time trial	1:02.659	13
James Ball piloted by Matt Rotherham	Men's tandem time trial B	1:00.053	2nd place, silver medalist(s)
Alex Pope piloted by Steff Lloyd	Men's tandem time trial B	1:03.912	5
Eleanor Coster	Women's time trial	35.116	13
Emma Finucane	Women's time trial	33.916	5
Lowri Thomas	Women's time trial	DNS	
Nia Holt piloted by Amy Cole	Women's tandem time trial B	1:13.435	5

Pursuit

Athlete	Event	Qualification		Final / BM	
Athlete	Event	Time	Rank	Opponent Results	Rank
William Roberts	Men's pursuit	4:16.036	11	Did not advance	
Joshua Tarling	Men's pursuit	4:16.873	12	Did not advance	
Rhys Britton; Joe Holt; Harvey McNaughton; William Roberts; Joshua Tarling	Men's team pursuit	3:54.613	4 QB	Australia; L	4
Ella Barnwell	Women's pursuit	3:34.064	11	Did not advance	
Anna Morris	Women's pursuit	3:26.386	6	Did not advance	
Megan Barker; Ella Barnwell; Eluned King; Anna Morris; Jessica Roberts	Women's team pursuit	4:20.398	4 QB	England; L	4

Points race

Athlete	Event	Final	
Athlete	Event	Points	Rank
Rhys Britton	Men's points race	DNF	
William Roberts	Men's points race	DNF	
Joshua Tarling	Men's points race	9	7
Eluned King	Women's points race	32	3rd place, bronze medalist(s)
Anna Morris	Women's points race	0	15
Jessica Roberts	Women's points race	21	10

Scratch race

Athlete	Event	Qualification	Final
Rhys Britton	Men's scratch race	1 Q	5
Joe Holt	Men's scratch race	6 Q	9
William Roberts	Men's scratch race	3 Q	3rd place, bronze medalist(s)
Ella Barnwell	Women's scratch race	—N/a	7
Megan Barker	Women's scratch race	—N/a	12
Anna Morris	Women's scratch race	—N/a	8

== Diving ==
A squad of three divers was officially selected on 8 June 2022.

Athlete	Event	Preliminaries		Final	
Athlete	Event	Points	Rank	Points	Rank
Aidan Heslop	Men's 10 m platform	341.60	9 Q	408.00	8
Lucy Hawkins	Women's 10 m platform	274.70	9 Q	257.95	12
Aidan Heslop; Ruby Thorne	Mixed 10 m synchronised platform	—N/a		284.28	8

== Gymnastics ==
A squad of thirteen gymnasts was officially selected on 15 June 2022.

=== Artistic ===
Men
Team Final & Individual Qualification

Athlete	Event	Apparatus						Total	Rank
Athlete	Event	F	PH	R	V	PB	HB	Total	Rank
Brinn Bevan	Team	–	12.500	13.100	–	14.450 Q	12.800	—N/a	
Joe Cemlyn-Jones	Team	13.400 Q	12.750	13.100	13.150	13.300	~~11.350~~	77.050	12 Q
Josh Cook	Team	~~12.600~~	12.300	~~12.100~~	13.600	~~12.200~~	13.100	75.900	15 Q
Emil Barber	Team	13.650 Q	–	–	14.150 Q	–	–	—N/a	
Jacob Edwards	Team	13.200	~~11.850~~	12.950	~~13.050~~	12.600	12.200	75.850	16
Total	Team	40.250	37.550	39.150	40.900	40.350	38.100	236.300	6

Individual Finals

Athlete	Event	Apparatus						Total	Rank
Athlete	Event	F	PH	R	V	PB	HB	Total	Rank
Josh Cook	All-around	13.100	11.800	13.000	13.800	12.200	12.000	75.900	12
Jacob Edwards	All-around	13.350	12.850	12.800	13.600	12.100	12.200	76.900	10

Athlete	Apparatus	Score	Rank
Emil Barber	Floor	13.800	4
Joe Cemlyn-Jones	Floor	11.366	8
Emil Barber	Vault	13.033	8
Brinn Bevan	Parallel bars	13.400	7

Women
Team Final & Individual Qualification

Athlete	Event	Apparatus				Total	Rank
Athlete	Event	V	UB	BB	F	Total	Rank
Mia Evans	Team	13.100	11.600	~~10.550~~	~~10.400~~	45.650	17
Jea Maracha	Team	~~12.950~~	11.750	12.550 Q	10.950	48.200	13 Q
Sofia Micallef	Team	–	11.700	12.450 Q	11.800	—N/a	
Mali Morgan	Team	13.000	–	–	–	—N/a	
Poppy Stickler	Team	13.000	~~11.250~~	12.450	12.700 Q	49.400	11 Q
Total	Team	39.100	35.050	37.450	35.450	147.050	5

Individual Finals

Athlete	Event	Apparatus				Total	Rank
Athlete	Event	V	UB	BB	F	Total	Rank
Jea Maracha	All-around	11.650	12.400	12.200	11.850	48.100	10
Poppy Stickler	All-around	12.850	12.700	12.150	12.500	50.200	5

Athlete	Apparatus	Score	Rank
Jea Maracha	Balance Beam	12.666	6
Sofia Micallef	Balance Beam	12.500	7
Poppy Stickler	Floor	12.566	6

=== Rhythmic ===
Team Final & Individual Qualification

Athlete	Event	Apparatus				Total	Rank
Athlete	Event	Hoop	Ball	Clubs	Ribbon	Total	Rank
Gemma Frizelle	Team	27.650 Q	27.300 Q	26.700	23.250	104.900	8 Q
Elizabeth Popova	Team	23.400	27.100 Q	27.700 Q	~~22.300~~	100.500	18 Q
Lauryn Carpenter	Team	23.000	23.250	22.600	~~20.100~~	88.950	24
Total	Team	74.050	77.650	77.000	23.250	251.950	6

Individual Finals

Athlete	Event	Apparatus				Total	Rank
Athlete	Event	Hoop	Ball	Clubs	Ribbon	Total	Rank
Gemma Frizelle	All-around	25.050	25.800	26.450	21.000	98.300	13
Elizabeth Popova	All-around	26.400	26.600	25.500	24.250	102.750	12

Athlete	Apparatus	Score	Rank
Gemma Frizelle	Hoop	28.700	1st place, gold medalist(s)
Gemma Frizelle	Ball	26.500	8
Elizabeth Popova	Ball	26.600	7
Elizabeth Popova	Clubs	27.700	5

== Hockey ==
By virtue of its position in the FIH World Rankings for men and women respectively (as of 1 February 2022), Wales qualified for both tournaments.

Detailed fixtures were released on 9 March 2022, followed by both rosters on 15 June 2022.

Summary

Key:

- FT = After full time
- P = Match decided by penalty-shootout

Team	Event	Preliminary round					Semifinal	Final / BM / PM	
Team	Event	Opposition Result	Opposition Result	Opposition Result	Opposition Result	Rank	Opposition Result	Opposition Result	Rank
Wales men	Men's tournament	Canada; W 5–1	England; L 2–4	Ghana; W 6–1	India; L 1–4	3	Did not advance	Classification 5–6; New Zealand; L 1–2	6
Wales women	Women's tournament	Canada; L 0–4	India; L 1–3	Ghana; W 4–0	England; L 0–5	4	Did not advance	Classification 7-8; South Africa; L 0–1	8

=== Men's tournament ===
Roster

- Toby Reynolds-Cotterill (gk)
- Dewi Roblin (gk)
- Gareth Furlong
- Daniel Kyriakides
- Hywel Jones
- Ioan Wall
- Steve Kelly
- Lewis Prosser (co-c)
- Jacob Draper
- Dale Hutchinson
- Rupert Shipperley (co-c)
- Joe Naughalty
- Gareth Griffiths
- Rhys Bradshaw
- Luke Hawker (co-c)
- James Carson
- Ben Francis
- Owain Dolan-Gray
- Alf Dinnie

Group play

Pos	Team	Pld	W	D	L	GF	GA	GD	Pts	Qualification
1	India	4	3	1	0	27	5	+22	10	Semi-finals
2	England (H)	4	3	1	0	25	8	+17	10	Semi-finals
3	Wales	4	2	0	2	14	10	+4	6	Fifth place match
4	Canada	4	0	1	3	4	25	−21	1	Seventh place match
5	Ghana	4	0	1	3	2	24	−22	1	Ninth place match

Source: Birmingham 2022
Rules for classification: 1) points; 2) number of wins; 3) goal difference; 4) goals scored; 5) head-to-head results.
(H) Hosts

30 July 2022
11:00

Canada	1–5	Wales
Sarmento 59'	Report	Furlong 8', 12', 14', 49'; Griffiths 45'

Umpires:
David Tomlinson (NZL)
Fraser Bell (SCO)

31 July 2022
14:00

England	4–2	Wales
Ward 2'; Bandurak 41', 57'; Roper 53'	Report	Prosser 19'; Carson 52'

Umpires:
Steve Rogers (AUS)
Sean Rapaport (RSA)

3 August 2022
16:00

Wales	6–1	Ghana
Furlong 26', 38', 44'; Francis 48'; Kyriakides 58'; Dolan-Gray 58'	Report	Kwofie 21'

Umpires:
Tim Bond (NZL)
Nick Bennett (ENG)

4 August 2022
14:00

India	4–1	Wales
Harmanpreet 18', 19', 41'; Gurjant 49'	Report	Furlong 55'

Umpires:
Nick Bennett (ENG)
Tyler Klenk (CAN)

Fifth place match

7 August 2022
18:00

New Zealand	2–1	Wales
Woods 7'; Findlay 41'	Report	Furlong 24'

Umpires:
Bruce Bale (ENG)
Nick Bennett (ENG)

=== Women's tournament ===
Roster

- Beth Bingham (co-c)
- Ella Jackson (gk)
- Eloise Laity
- Hannah Cozens
- Holly Munro
- Izzie Howell
- Izzy Webb
- Jo Westwood
- Leah Wilkinson (co-c)
- Livvy Hoskins
- Millie Holme
- Phoebe Richards
- Rebecca Daniel
- Rose Thomas (gk)
- Sarah Jones
- Sian French (co-c)
- Sophie Robinson
- Xenna Hughes

Group play

Pos	Team	Pld	W	D	L	GF	GA	GD	Pts	Qualification
1	England (H)	4	4	0	0	21	1	+20	12	Semi-finals
2	India	4	3	0	1	12	6	+6	9	Semi-finals
3	Canada	4	2	0	2	14	5	+9	6	Fifth place match
4	Wales	4	1	0	3	5	12	−7	3	Seventh place match
5	Ghana	4	0	0	4	1	29	−28	0	Ninth place match

Source: Birmingham 2022
Rules for classification: 1) points; 2) number of wins; 3) goal difference; 4) goals scored; 5) head-to-head results.
(H) Hosts

29 July 2022
16:00

Canada	4–0	Wales
Haughn 21'; Stairs 33', 50'; McManus 45'	Report

Umpires:
Amber Church (NZL)
Binish Hayat (PAK)

30 July 2022
19:00

India	3–1	Wales
Vandana 26', 48'; Gurjit 28'	Report	Hughes 45'

Umpires:
Cookie Tan (SGP)
Lelia Sacre (CAN)

1 August 2022
09:00

Wales	4–0	Ghana
Wilkinson 40'; Webb 50'; Holme 52'; Bingham 58'	Report

Umpires:
Binish Hayat (PAK)
Rebecca Woodcock (ENG)

4 August 2022
11:00

England	5–0	Wales
Balsdon 18', 34', 58'; Martin 28'; Ansley 54'	Report

Umpires:
Wanri Venter (RSA)
Binish Hayat (PAK)

Seventh place match

5 August 2022
11:15

Wales	0–1	South Africa
	Report	Du Plessis 38'

Umpires:
Lelia Sacre (CAN)
Cookie Tan (SGP)

== Judo ==
A squad of six judoka was officially selected on 8 June 2022.

Men

Athlete	Event	Round of 32	Round of 16	Quarterfinals	Semifinals	Repechage	Final/BM	
Athlete	Event	Opposition Result	Opposition Result	Opposition Result	Opposition Result	Opposition Result	Opposition Result	Rank
Callum Bennett	-60 kg	Mwenda (TAN); W 10–0	J Katz (AUS); L 0–10	Did not advance				
Daniel Rabbitt	-60 kg	Agudoo (GHA); W 10–0	Ferguson (SCO); W 10s2–0s2	Hall (ENG); L 0–10	Did not advance	Zulu (ZAM); L 0s1–10	Did not advance	
Gregg Varey	-66 kg	—N/a	Yartey (GHA); W 10s2–0s3	Short (SCO); L 0s3–10s2	Did not advance	N Katz (AUS); L 0s3–10	Did not advance	

Women

Athlete	Event	Round of 16	Quarterfinals	Semifinals	Repechage	Final/BM	
Athlete	Event	Opposition Result	Opposition Result	Opposition Result	Opposition Result	Opposition Result	Rank
Ashleigh-Anne Barnikel	-48 kg	Marappulige (SRI); W 10–0	Whitebooi (RSA); L 0–10	Did not advance	Esposito (MLT); L 0–10	Did not advance	
Jasmine Hacker-Jones	-63 kg	—N/a	Howell (ENG); L 0s2–10	Did not advance	James (NGR); W 10s2–0s3	Etoua Biock (CMR); W 10–1	3rd place, bronze medalist(s)
Natalie Powell	-78 kg	—N/a	Agathe (MRI); W 10–0	Godbout (CAN); W 10–0	—N/a	Reid (ENG); L 0–1s1	2nd place, silver medalist(s)

== Lawn bowls ==
A squad of four parasport players (plus two directors) was officially selected on 27 May 2022.

Ten players were added to the squad on 8 June 2022.

Men

Athlete	Event	Group stage					Quarterfinal	Semifinal	Final / BM	
Athlete	Event	Opposition Score	Opposition Score	Opposition Score	Opposition Score	Rank	Opposition Score	Opposition Score	Opposition Score	Rank
Daniel Salmon	Singles	Kelly (NIR); L 12–21	Tagelagi (NIU); W 21–9	Bester (CAN); L 10–21	Dixon (NFK); W 21–11	3	Did not advance			
Jarrad Breen; Daniel Salmon	Pairs	Namibia; W 16–14	Jamaica; W 33–8	Northern Ireland; L 11–14	Norfolk Island; W 19–16	2 Q	South Africa; W 16–11	Northern Ireland; W 22–14	England; W 19–18	1st place, gold medalist(s)
Owain Dando; Ross Owen; Jon Tomlinson	Triples	Fiji; L 12–13	Northern Ireland; D 15–15	Norfolk Island; W 31–10	—N/a	2 Q	Scotland; W 17–12	England; L 5–17	Fiji; W 21–7	3rd place, bronze medalist(s)
Jarrad Breen; Owain Dando; Ross Owen; Jon Tomlinson	Fours	Norfolk Island; W 19–8	Brunei; W 28–2	Malaysia; D 12–12	—N/a	1 Q	New Zealand; W 18–16	Northern Ireland; L 9–18	England; L 12–17	4

Women

Athlete	Event	Group stage					Quarterfinal	Semifinal	Final / BM	
Athlete	Event	Opposition Score	Opposition Score	Opposition Score	Opposition Score	Rank	Opposition Score	Opposition Score	Opposition Score	Rank
Laura Daniels	Singles	Arthur-Almond (FLK); W 21–2	Choudhury (IND); W 21–10	O'Neill (NIR); W 21–19	Hoggan (SCO); L 14–21	2 Q	Wilson (NFK); L 11–21	Did not advance		
Sara Nicholls; Caroline Taylor	Pairs	Canada; D 16–16	Australia; L 15–21	Brunei; W 27–8	—N/a	2 Q	New Zealand; L 15–16	Did not advance		
Anwen Butten; Laura Daniels; Ysie White	Triples	Cook Islands; L 11–14	Botswana; D 16–16	Scotland; W 16–14	—N/a	2 Q	Malaysia; L 22–25	Did not advance		
Anwen Butten; Sara Nicholls; Caroline Taylor; Ysie White	Fours	New Zealand; L 12–18	South Africa; L 15–16	Niue; W 28–6	—N/a	3	Did not advance			

Parasport

Athlete	Event	Group stage						Semifinal	Final / BM	
Athlete	Event	Opposition Score	Opposition Score	Opposition Score	Opposition Score	Opposition Score	Rank	Opposition Score	Opposition Score	Rank
Paul Brown; Chris Spriggs	Men's pairs B6–8	South Africa; W 14–9	Scotland; L 9–19	New Zealand; L 12–20	England; L 11–12	Australia; L 11–15	5	Did not advance		
Julie Thomas directed by Mark Adams; Gordon Llewellyn directed by John Wilson	Mixed pairs B2–3	England; L 9–18	South Africa; W 15–8	New Zealand; W 18–8	Australia; L 13–18	Scotland; L 8–15	3 Q	Australia; W 13–10	Scotland; L 9–16	2nd place, silver medalist(s)

== Netball ==
By virtue of its position in the World Netball Rankings (as of 31 January 2022), Wales qualified for the tournament.

Complete fixtures were announced in March 2022, followed by the chosen squad on 5 July 2022.

Summary

Team	Event	Group stage						Semifinal	Final / BM / Cl.	
Team	Event	Opposition Result	Opposition Result	Opposition Result	Opposition Result	Opposition Result	Rank	Opposition Result	Opposition Result	Rank
Wales women	Women's tournament	Jamaica; L 43–72	Scotland; W 48–42	Australia; L 33–79	South Africa; L 51–69	Barbados; W 60–44	4	Did not advance	Classification 7–8; Malawi; L 56–62	8

Roster

- Betsy Creak
- Georgia Rowe
- Zoe Matthewman
- Eleanor Roberts
- Suzy Drane (co-c)
- Bethan Dyke
- Clare Jones (co-vc)
- Shona O'Dwyer
- Nia Jones (co-c)
- Christina Shaw
- Leila Thomas
- Ella Powell-Davies (co-vc)

Group play

Pos	Team	Pld	W	D	L	GF	GA	GD	Pts	Qualification
1	Jamaica	5	5	0	0	378	205	+173	10	Semi-finals
2	Australia	5	4	0	1	386	187	+199	8	Semi-finals
3	South Africa	5	3	0	2	323	275	+48	6	Classification matches
4	Wales	5	2	0	3	235	306	−71	4	Classification matches
5	Scotland	5	1	0	4	224	302	−78	2	Classification matches
6	Barbados	5	0	0	5	150	421	−271	0	Classification matches

Source: Birmingham 2022

29 July 2022; 18:00	Report	Jamaica	72–43	Wales	National Exhibition Centre; Umpires: Louise Travis; Ken Metekingi
29 July 2022; 18:00	Report	Beckford 8/12 (67%); Fowler 32/33 (97%); Nelson 29/29 (100%); Robison 3/5 (60%)		Creak 22/27 (81%); Roberts 3/5 (60%); Rowe 18/19 (95%)	National Exhibition Centre; Umpires: Louise Travis; Ken Metekingi

31 July 2022; 20:00	Report	Scotland	42–48	Wales	National Exhibition Centre; Umpires: Ken Metekingi; Kate Wright
31 July 2022; 20:00	Report	Barrie 15/22 (68%); Goodwin 20/27 (74%); McCall 7/13 (54%)		Creak 12/16 (75%); Rowe 36/38 (95%)	National Exhibition Centre; Umpires: Ken Metekingi; Kate Wright

2 August 2022; 12:00	Report	Australia	79–33	Wales	National Exhibition Centre; Umpires: Gareth Fowler; Louise Travis
2 August 2022; 12:00	Report	Bueta 26/27 (96%); Koenen 49/54 (91%); Wood 4/4 (100%)		Creak 11/11 (100%); Roberts 6/11 (55%); Rowe 16/18 (89%)	National Exhibition Centre; Umpires: Gareth Fowler; Louise Travis

3 August 2022; 12:00	Report	South Africa	69–51	Wales	National Exhibition Centre; Umpires: Angela Armstrong-Lush; Bronwen Adams
3 August 2022; 12:00	Report	Taljaard 1/1 (100%) van der Berg 35/39 (90%); Venter 33/36 (92%)		Creak 26/37 (70%); Roberts 4/5 (80%); Rowe 21/25 (84%)	National Exhibition Centre; Umpires: Angela Armstrong-Lush; Bronwen Adams

4 August 2022; 11:00	Report	Wales	60–44	Barbados	National Exhibition Centre; Umpires: Louise Travis; Elizna Van Den Berg
4 August 2022; 11:00	Report	Creak 30/33 (91%); Roberts 9/14 (64%); Rowe 21/24 (88%)		Agard 4/5 (80%); Blackman 19/19 (100%); Wharton 21/27 (78%)	National Exhibition Centre; Umpires: Louise Travis; Elizna Van Den Berg

Seventh place match

5 August 2022; 14:30	Report	Wales	56–62	Malawi	National Exhibition Centre; Umpires: Ken Metekingi; Kate Wright
5 August 2022; 14:30	Report	Creak 8/10 (80%); Roberts 1/2 (50%); Rowe 47/49 (96%)		Chimaliro 3/4 (75%); Kumwenda 49/50 (98%); Simtowe 10/11 (91%)	National Exhibition Centre; Umpires: Ken Metekingi; Kate Wright

== Rugby sevens ==
Wales officially qualified for the men's tournament. They did so through their position in the 2018–19 / 2019–20 World Rugby Sevens Series.

The squad was confirmed on 13 July 2022.

Summary

Team	Event	Preliminary Round				Quarterfinal / CQ	Semifinal / CS	Final / BM / CF	
Team	Event	Opposition Result	Opposition Result	Opposition Result	Rank	Opposition Result	Opposition Result	Opposition Result	Rank
Wales men's	Men's tournament	Canada; L 0–31	Zambia; W 38–5	Fiji; L 24–38	3	CQ 9-16; Malaysia; W 33–14	CS 9-16; England; L 10–14	Did not advance	11

=== Men's tournament ===
Roster

- Luke Treharne
- Tyler Morgan
- Morgan Sieniawski
- Sam Cross
- Tom Brown
- Callum Williams
- Owen Jenkins
- Tom Williams
- Morgan Williams
- Cole Swannack
- Lloyd Lewis
- Ewan Rosser
- Callum Carson

Pool C

Pos	Team	Pld	W	D	L	PF	PA	PD	Pts	Qualification
1	Fiji	3	3	0	0	109	36	+73	9	Advance to Quarter-finals
2	Canada	3	2	0	1	67	31	+36	7	Advance to Quarter-finals
3	Wales	3	1	0	2	62	74	−12	5	Advance to classification Quarter-finals
4	Zambia	3	0	0	3	17	114	−97	3	Advance to classification Quarter-finals

Source: Birmingham2022
Rules for classification: 1) Points; 2) Head-to-head result; 3) Point difference; 4) Points scored.

29 July 2022
12:40

Canada	31–0	Wales
Try: Russell (2) 3' m, 8' c Coats 5' m Thiel 7' c Oworu 13' c Con: Coats (3/5) 7', 8', 13'; Cards: Morra (yellow card) 13'	Report	Cards: T. Williams (yellow card) 11'

Coventry Stadium, Coventry
Referee: Finlay Brown (Scotland)

29 July 2022
21:10

Wales	38–5	Zambia
Try: C. Williams 1' c Swannack 2' c Sieniawski 5' c Treharne 11' m Carson 13' c Smith 14' m Con: Treharne (3/3) 1', 3', 6'; T. Williams (1/3) 13'; Cards: C. Williams (yellow card) 9'	Report	Try: Kaushiku 9' m Con: Mwewa (0/1); Cards: Mukosa (yellow card) 11'; Banda (yellow card) 13'

Coventry Stadium, Coventry
Referee: Nick Hogan (New Zealand)

30 July 2022
13:02

Fiji	38–24	Wales
Try: Sauturaga (2) 1' c, 8' m Naduvalo (2) 3' c, 5' m Nacuqu 6' c Rasaku 12' c Con: Sauturaga (1/1) 1'; Nacuqu (2/4) 3', 7'; Rasaku (1/1) 13'	Report	Try: T. Williams 2' c Lewis (2) 10' c, 11' c M. Williams 14' m Con: T. Williams (3/3) 2', 10', 12'; Jenkins (0/1)

Coventry Stadium, Coventry
Referee: Adam Leal (England)

Classification Quarterfinals

30 July 2022
18:36

Wales	33–14	Malaysia
Try: C. Williams (3) 4' m, 8' c, 9' c Lewis 13' c Carson 14' c Con: T. Williams (3/4) 8', 9', 13'; Swannack (1/1) 14'	Report	Try: Sudin 2' c Nordin 7' c Con: Mat Zizi (2/2) 2', 7'

Coventry Stadium, Coventry
Referee: Talal-Azmat Chaudhry (Canada)

9th-12th Semifinals

31 July 2022
11:14

England	14–10	Wales
Try: Homer 1' c Bavadra 4' c Con: Roddick (2/2) 1', 4'	Report	Try: Williams (2) 12' m, 14' m Con: Swannack (0/2); Cards: Morgan (yellow card) 8'

Coventry Stadium, Coventry
Referee: Talal-Azmat Chaudhry (Canada)

== Squash ==
A squad of five players was officially selected on 8 June 2022.

Singles

Athlete	Event	Round of 64	Round of 32	Round of 16	Quarterfinals	Semifinals	Final	
Athlete	Event	Opposition Score	Opposition Score	Opposition Score	Opposition Score	Opposition Score	Opposition Score	Rank
Peter Creed	Men's singles	Othniel Bailey (SVG); W 3–0	David Baillargeon (CAN); L 1–3	Did not advance				
Emyr Evans	Men's singles	Luca Reich (IVB); W 3–0	Mohammad Syafiq Kamal (MAS); W 3–1	Paul Coll (NZL); L 1–3	Did not advance			
Joel Makin	Men's singles	Bye	Michael Kawooya (UGA); W 3–0	Alan Clyne (SCO); W 3–0	Ng Eain Yow (MAS); W 3–1	James Willstrop (ENG); W 3–0	Paul Coll (NZL); L 2–3	(silver)
Tesni Evans	Women's singles	Bye	Amanda Haywood (BAR); W 3–0	Rachel Arnold (MAS); L 0–3	Did not advance			
Emily Whitlock	Women's singles	Bye	Anahat Singh (IND); W 3–1	Donna Lobban (AUS); W 3–0	Sarah-Jane Perry (ENG); L 0–3	Did not advance		

Doubles

Athlete	Event	Round of 32	Round of 16	Quarterfinals	Semifinals	Final	
Athlete	Event	Opposition Score	Opposition Score	Opposition Score	Opposition Score	Opposition Score	Rank
Peter Creed; Emyr Evans	Men's doubles	Bye	Canada; L 0–2	Did not advance			
Peter Creed; Emily Whitlock	Mixed doubles	Guyana; W 2–0	India; L 0–2	Did not advance			
Tesni Evans; Joel Makin	Mixed doubles	Malta; W 2–0	Malaysia; W 2–0	England; L 1–2	Did not advance		

== Swimming ==
Wales selected four para swimmers (one man, three women) on 27 May 2022.

Sixteen swimmers were added to the squad on 8 June 2022, including Tokyo 2020 relay champions Calum Jarvis and Matt Richards.

Men

Athlete	Event	Heat		Semifinal		Final	
Athlete	Event	Time	Rank	Time	Rank	Time	Rank
Dan Jones	50 m freestyle	22.65	10 Q	22.76	13	Did not advance	
Dan Jones	100 m freestyle	DNS		Did not advance			
Matthew Richards	100 m freestyle	49.19	7 Q	49.13	9	Did not advance	
Kieran Bird	200 m freestyle	1:48.99	13	—N/a		Did not advance	
Calum Jarvis	200 m freestyle	1:48.22	6 Q	—N/a		1:47.84	7
Matthew Richards	200 m freestyle	1:47.59	5 Q	—N/a		1:47.19	5
Dylan Broom	200 m freestyle S14	—N/a				1:58.65	7
Kieran Bird	400 m freestyle	3:50.30	9	—N/a		Did not advance	
Daniel Jervis	400 m freestyle	3:50.13	8 Q	—N/a		3:51.19	8
Daniel Jervis	1500 m freestyle	DNS		—N/a		Did not advance	
Joe Small	50 m backstroke	25.60	10 Q	25.36	7 Q	25.44	8
Liam White	50 m backstroke	25.30	5 Q	25.48	10	Did not advance	
Joe Small	100 m backstroke	55.13	12 Q	55.22	11	Did not advance	
Liam White	100 m backstroke	55.90	15 Q	55.68	14	Did not advance	
Kyle Booth	50 m breaststroke	28.30	15 Q	28.35	15	Did not advance	
Bradley Newman	50 m breaststroke	28.71	19	Did not advance			
Kyle Booth	100 m breaststroke	1:02.00	14 Q	1:02.28	15	Did not advance	
Bradley Newman	100 m breaststroke	1:04.12	24	Did not advance			
Kyle Booth	200 m breaststroke	2:16.43	9	—N/a		Did not advance	
Tom Carswell	50 m butterfly	24.29	19	Did not advance			
Lewis Fraser	50 m butterfly	23.73	6 Q	23.56	6 Q	23.71	8
Tom Carswell	100 m butterfly	54.60	20	Did not advance			
Lewis Fraser	100 m butterfly	53.16	11 Q	52.81	10	Did not advance	
Tom Carswell; Lewis Fraser; Liam White; Dan Jones; Matthew Richards; Calum Jarvis	4 × 100 m freestyle relay	3:18.69	3 Q	—N/a		3:15.79	4
Calum Jarvis; Matthew Richards; Dan Jones; Kieran Bird	4 × 200 m freestyle relay	—N/a				7:10.64	4
Liam White; Bradley Newman; Tom Carswell; Dan Jones; Joe Small; Kyle Booth; Lewis Fraser; Matthew Richards	4 × 100 m medley relay	3:41.62	4 Q	—N/a		3:36.43	4

Women

Athlete	Event	Heat		Semifinal		Final	
Athlete	Event	Time	Rank	Time	Rank	Time	Rank
Rebecca Sutton	100 m freestyle	56.37	15 Q	56.02	12	Did not advance	
Medi Harris	50 m backstroke	28.03	3 Q	27.64	2 Q	27.62	5
Charlotte Evans	100 m backstroke	1:02.31	10 Q	1:02.76	12	Did not advance	
Medi Harris	100 m backstroke	1:00.02	3 Q	59.64	3 Q	59.62	3rd place, bronze medalist(s)
Lily Rice	100 m backstroke S8	—N/a				1:23.06	3rd place, bronze medalist(s)
Charlotte Evans	200 m backstroke	2:14.68	6 Q	—N/a		2:14.26	6
Harriet Jones	50 m butterfly	26.68	5 Q	26.39	7 Q	26.20	6
Alys Thomas	50 m butterfly	27.52	17	Did not advance			
Harriet Jones	100 m butterfly	59.25	8 Q	58.90	7 Q	59.02	6
Alys Thomas	100 m butterfly	59.11	7 Q	59.16	11	Did not advance	
Alys Thomas	200 m butterfly	2:11.43	8 Q	—N/a		2:10.42	6
Rebecca Lewis	200 m individual medley SM10	—N/a				2:54.07	8
Meghan Willis	200 m individual medley SM10	—N/a				2:44.52	7

Mixed

Athlete	Event	Heat		Final	
Athlete	Event	Time	Rank	Time	Rank
Dan Jones; Calum Jarvis; Matt Richards; Rebecca Sutton; Medi Harris	4 × 100 m freestyle relay	3:29.66	4 Q	3:26.58	4
Charlotte Evans; Kyle Booth; Harriet Jones; Liam White; Medi Harris; Matt Richards	4 × 100 m medley relay	3:53.05	6 Q	3:47.76	5

== Table tennis ==
Wales qualified for the women's team event. In addition, Callum Evans was picked for the men's singles event. The women's team was announced on 11 May 2022.

In addition, two parasport players were selected on 27 May 2022.

Singles

Athletes	Event	Group stage				Round of 32	Round of 16	Quarterfinal	Semifinal	Final / BM	
Athletes	Event	Opposition Score	Opposition Score	Opposition Score	Rank	Opposition Score	Opposition Score	Opposition Score	Opposition Score	Opposition Score	Rank
Callum Evans	Men's singles	Crea (SEY); W 4–0	Elia (CYP); W 4–0	—N/a	1 Q	Wang (CAN); L 1–4	Did not advance				
Charlotte Carey	Women's singles	Bye				Oribamise (NGR); W 4–2	Akula (IND); L 3–4	Did not advance			
Anna Hursey	Women's singles	Spicer (TTO); W 4–0	Jalim (MRI); W 4–0	—N/a	1 Q	Bello (NGR); W 4–0	Cummings (GUY); W 4–0	Liu (AUS); L 1–4	Did not advance		
Chloe Thomas	Women's singles	Maphanga (RSA); W 4–0	Ali (MDV); W 4–0	—N/a	1 Q	Hanffou (CMR); W 4–2	Zeng (SGP); L 1–4	Did not advance			

Doubles

Athletes	Event	Round of 64	Round of 32	Round of 16	Quarterfinal	Semifinal	Final / BM	
Athletes	Event	Opposition Score	Opposition Score	Opposition Score	Opposition Score	Opposition Score	Opposition Score	Rank
Charlotte Carey; Anna Hursey	Women's doubles	Bye	Bristol / Sinon (SEY); W 3–0	Fu / Zhang (CAN); W 3–0	Batra / Chitale (IND); W 3–1	Feng / Zeng (SGP); L 2–3	Wong / Zhou (SGP); W 3–1	3rd place, bronze medalist(s)
Lara Whitton; Chloe Thomas	Women's doubles	Bye	Gauthier / Morin (CAN); W 3–2	Akula / Tennison (IND); L 0–3	Did not advance			
Callum Evans; Charlotte Carey	Mixed doubles	Walker / Tsaptsinos (ENG); W 3–2	Wang / Zhang (CAN); L 0–3	Did not advance				

Team

Athletes	Event	Group stage				Quarterfinal	Semifinal	Final	Rank
Athletes	Event	Opposition Score	Opposition Score	Opposition Score	Rank	Opposition Score	Opposition Score	Opposition Score	Rank
Charlotte Carey; Anna Hursey; Chloe Thomas; Lara Whitton	Women's team	Vanuatu; W 3–0	Uganda; W 3–0	Canada; W 3–2	1 Q	England; W 3–0	Malaysia; L 2–3	Australia; L 0–3	4

Parasport

Athletes	Event	Group stage				Semifinal	Final	Rank
Athletes	Event	Opposition Score	Opposition Score	Opposition Score	Rank	Opposition Score	Opposition Score	Rank
Joshua Stacey	Men's singles C8–10	Chee (MAS); W 3–1	Agunbiade (NGR); W 3–1	Kailis (CYP); W 3–0	1 Q	Wilson (ENG); W 3–1	Ma (AUS); W 3–2	1st place, gold medalist(s)
Grace Williams	Women's singles C6–10	Lei (AUS); L 0–3	Olo (SOL); W 3–0	Pickard (ENG); L 1–3	3	Did not advance		

== Triathlon ==
One paratriathlete was officially selected on 27 May 2022, having qualified via the World Triathlon Para Rankings of 28 March 2022. Five triathletes and a guide were added on 8 June 2022.

Individual

Athlete	Event	Swim (750 m)	Trans 1	Bike (20 km)	Trans 2	Run (5 km)	Total	Rank
Dominic Coy	Men's	8:57	0:51	27:41	0:19	15:35	53:23	18
Iestyn Harrett	Men's	8:49	0:52	26:08	0:21	15:41	51:51	9
Olivia Mathias	Women's	9:30	0:57	29:27	0:20	17:05	57:19	7
Isabel Morris	Women's	9:49	0:57	31:04	0:24	18:02	1:00:16	19
Non Stanford	Women's	9:32	0:55	29:29	0:21	16:53	57:10	6

Mixed relay

Athlete	Event	Time						Rank
Athlete	Event	Swim (300 m)	Trans 1	Bike (5 km)	Trans 2	Run (2 km)	Total group	Rank
Iestyn Harrett	Mixed relay	3:41	0:50	6:41	0:18	6:40	18:10	—N/a
Olivia Mathias	Mixed relay	4:16	0:55	7:20	0:19	7:12	20:02	—N/a
Dominic Coy	Mixed relay	4:11	0:56	6:39	0:18	6:30	18:34	—N/a
Non Stanford	Mixed relay	4:38	0:57	7:40	0:19	7:06	20:40	—N/a
Total	Mixed relay	—N/a					1:17.26	2nd place, silver medalist(s)

Paratriathlon

Athlete	Event	Swim (750 m)	Trans 1	Bike (20 km)	Trans 2	Run (5 km)	Total	Rank
Rhys Jones; Guide: Rhys James	Men's PTVI	13:07	1:19	28:50	0:29	19:31	1:06:02	4

== Weightlifting ==
Courtesy of their positions on the IWF Commonwealth Ranking List (which was finalised on 9 March 2022), a squad of seven weightlifters (two men, five women) was officially selected on 19 April 2022.

Men

Athlete	Event	Snatch		Clean & jerk		Total	Rank
Athlete	Event	Result	Rank	Result	Rank	Total	Rank
Michael Farmer	73 kg	128	8	158	7	286	7
Jordan Sakkas	109 kg	146	7	182	7	328	7

Women

Athlete	Event	Snatch		Clean & jerk		Total	Rank
Athlete	Event	Result	Rank	Result	Rank	Total	Rank
Hannah Powell	49 kg	67	7	85	8	152	7
Catrin Jones	55 kg	–	–	Did not finish			
Christie-Marie Williams	64 kg	83	7	100	9	183	7
Faye Pittman	71 kg	81	10	108	7	189	9
Amy Salt	76 kg	86	9	–	–	Did not finish	

== Wrestling ==
Two wrestlers were officially selected on 8 June 2022.

Key:

- VT - Victory by Fall.
- PP - Decision by Points - the loser with technical points.
- PO - Decision by Points - the loser without technical points.

Athlete	Event	Round of 16	Quarterfinal	Semifinal	Repechage	Final / BM	
Athlete	Event	Opposition Result	Opposition Result	Opposition Result	Opposition Result	Opposition Result	Rank
Curtis Dodge	Men's -74 kg	van Zijl (RSA); L 0–10 PO	Did not advance				
Shannon Harry	Women's -57 kg	Symeonidis (AUS); L 12–12 VT	Did not advance				
