= Niue at the 2022 Commonwealth Games =

- Flag of Niue
- CG code: NIU
- CGA: Niue Island Sports and Commonwealth Games Association
- Website: www.facebook.com/NISCGA (Facebook)

in Birmingham, England 28 July 2022 – 8 August 2022
- Competitors: 15 (10 men and 5 women) in 3 sports
- Flag bearers: Travis Tapatuetoa; Olivia Buckingham
- Medals Ranked =40th: Gold 0 Silver 0 Bronze 1 Total 1

Commonwealth Games appearances (overview)
- 2002; 2006; 2010; 2014; 2018; 2022; 2026; 2030

Niue competed at the 2022 Commonwealth Games in Birmingham, England from 28 July to 8 August 2022. It was Niue's sixth appearance at the Games.

The Niue team of 15 athletes (ten men and five women), competing in three sports, was named on 20 June 2022.

Boxer Travis Tapatuetoa and lawn bowler Olivia Buckingham were the delegation's flagbearers during the opening ceremony.

Boxer Duken Tutakitoa-Williams became Niue's first ever Commonwealth Games medallist when he won a bronze medal in the men's heavyweight event.

== Competitors ==
The following is the list of number of competitors participating at the Games per sport/discipline.

Sport	Men	Women	Total
Boxing	4	0	4
Lawn bowls	5	5	10
Weightlifting	1	0	1
Total	10	5	15

== Medallists ==
Medal	Name	Sport	Event	Date
3rd place, bronze medalist(s)	Duken Tutakitoa-Williams	Boxing	Men's heavyweight	6 August 2022

== Boxing ==
A squad of four boxers was officially selected as of 20 June 2022.

Men

Athlete	Event	Round of 32	Round of 16	Quarterfinals	Semifinals	Final	
Athlete	Event	Opposition Result	Opposition Result	Opposition Result	Opposition Result	Opposition Result	Rank
De Niro Pao	Light welterweight	Sanford (CAN); L RSC	did not advance				
Xavier Mata'afa-Ikinofo	Welterweight	Bye	Onana Ngah (CMR); W 4–1	Tokas (IND); L 0–5	did not advance		
Travis Tapatuetoa	Light heavyweight	Bye	Kumar (IND); L 0–5	did not advance			
Duken Tutakitoa-Williams	Heavyweight	—N/a	Bye	Schuster (COK); W RSC	Plodzicki-Faoagali (SAM); L 0–5	Did not advance	3rd place, bronze medalist(s)

== Lawn bowls ==
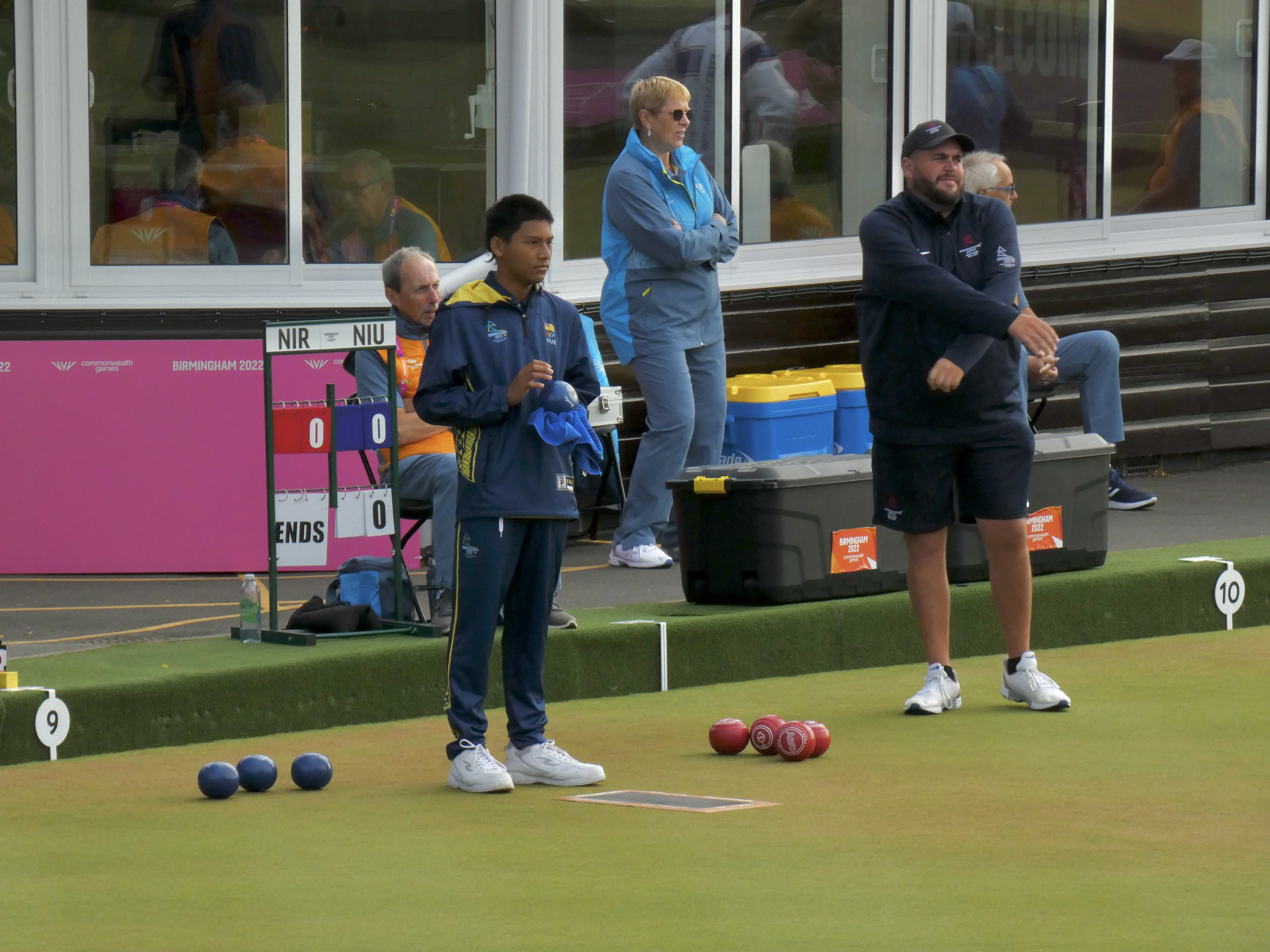
Tukala Matua Tagelagi (Niue) and Gary Kelly (Northern Ireland) before their lawn bowls singles match.

A squad of ten bowlers was officially selected as of 20 June 2022. It includes Dalton Tagelagi, who notably will compete during his tenure as the Premier of Niue.

Men

Athlete	Event	Group Stage					Quarterfinal	Semifinal	Final / BM	
Athlete	Event	Opposition Score	Opposition Score	Opposition Score	Opposition Score	Rank	Opposition Score	Opposition Score	Opposition Score	Rank
Tukala Matua Tagelagi	Singles	Bester (CAN); L 11–21	Dixon (NFK); L 13–21	Salmon (WAL); L 9–21	Kelly (NIR); L 14–21	5	did not advance			
Tukala Matua Tagelagi; Dalton Tagelagi	Pairs	New Zealand; L 14–23	Jersey; L 9–27	Scotland; L 10–23	Canada; L 9–20	5	did not advance			
Norman Mitimeti; Leslie Lagatule; Kolonisi Polima	Triples	Australia; L 7–29	Jersey; L 9–26	Cook Islands; L 17–24	—N/a	4	did not advance			
Norman Mitimeti; Leslie Lagatule; Kolonisi Polima; Dalton Tagelagi	Fours	Australia; L 8–18	Northern Ireland; L 7–21	Canada; L 4–18	—N/a	4	did not advance			

Women

Athlete	Event	Group Stage					Quarterfinal	Semifinal	Final / BM	
Athlete	Event	Opposition Score	Opposition Score	Opposition Score	Opposition Score	Rank	Opposition Score	Opposition Score	Opposition Score	Rank
Olivia Buckingham	Singles	Ahmad (MAS); L 7–21	Lim (SGP); L 19–21	Inch (NZL); L 10–21	Pharaoh (ENG); L 16–21	5	did not advance			
Hina Rereiti; Olivia Buckingham	Pairs	South Africa; L 9–26	India; L 6–23	New Zealand; L 16–19	—N/a	4	did not advance			
Selasiosiana Simpson; Liline Hewett; Tagaloa Tukuitoga	Triples	England; L 12–26	New Zealand; L 10–31	India; L 7–28	—N/a	4	did not advance			
Selasiosiana Simpson; Tagaloa Tukuitoga; Liline Hewett; Hina Rereiti	Fours	South Africa; L 7–24	New Zealand; L 3–29	Wales; L 6–28	—N/a	4	did not advance			

== Weightlifting ==
Niue accepted a Bipartite Invitation for the weightlifting competition and selected Giovanni Toimata to compete. Toimata travelled to Birmingham, but was excluded from competition by the Commonwealth Games Federation following a mix-up with paperwork.

Athlete	Event	Weight lifted		Total	Rank
Athlete	Event	Snatch	Clean & jerk	Total	Rank
Giovanni Toimata	Men's +109 kg	DNS			
