= Cook Islands at the 2022 Commonwealth Games =

- Flag of the Cook Islands
- CGF code: COK
- CGA: Cook Islands Sports and National Olympic Committee

in Birmingham, England 28 July 2022 – 8 August 2022
- Competitors: 18 (10 men and 8 women) in 5 sports
- Flag bearers (opening): Aidan Zittersteijn; Nooroa Mataio
- Flag bearer (closing): TBD
- Medals: Gold 0 Silver 0 Bronze 0 Total 0

Commonwealth Games appearances (overview)
- 1974; 1978; 1982; 1986; 1990; 1994; 1998; 2002; 2006; 2010; 2014; 2018; 2022; 2026; 2030

The Cook Islands competed at the 2022 Commonwealth Games at Birmingham, England from 28 July to 8 August 2022. It was the team's twelfth appearance at the Commonwealth Games.

Lawn bowlers Aidan Zittersteijn and Nooroa Mataio were the delegations's flagbearer during the opening ceremony.

== Competitors ==
The following is the list of number of competitors participating at the Games per sport/discipline.

Sport	Men	Women	Total
Athletics	1	0	1
Boxing	2	0	2
Lawn bowls	5	5	10
Swimming	2	2	4
Weightlifting	0	1	1
Total	10	8	18

== Athletics ==
One athlete was officially selected on 9 March 2022.

Men
Track and road events

Athlete	Event	Heat		Final	
Athlete	Event	Result	Rank	Result	Rank
Alex Beddoes	800 m	1:52.72	6	Did not advance	

== Boxing ==
Men

Athlete	Event	Round of 32	Round of 16	Quarterfinals	Semifinals	Final	
Athlete	Event	Opposition Result	Opposition Result	Opposition Result	Opposition Result	Opposition Result	Rank
Tawhiri Toheriri-Hallett	Light middleweight	Pafios (CYP); L 0 - 5	did not advance				
Michael Schuster	Heavyweight	—	Bye	T-Williams (NIU); L RSC	did not advance		

== Lawn bowls ==
A squad of ten bowlers was officially selected on 9 March 2022.

Men

Athlete	Event	Group Stage					Quarterfinal	Semifinal	Final / BM	
Athlete	Event	Opposition Score	Opposition Score	Opposition Score	Opposition Score	Rank	Opposition Score	Opposition Score	Opposition Score	Rank
Phillip Jim	Singles	Wilson (AUS); L 9 - 21	Kimani (KEN); W 21 - 17	Priaulx (GGY); L 17 - 21	Evans (RSA); L 9 - 21	4	did not advance			
Alex Kairua; Phillip Jim	Pairs	Falkland Islands; W 23–12	India; L 8–15	England; L 7–20	Malaysia; L 15–19	4	did not advance			
Aidan Zittersteijn; Royden Aperau; Jason Lindsay	Triples	Jersey; L 11–19	Australia; L 15–25	Niue; W 24–17	—	3	did not advance			
Jason Lindsay; Aidan Zittersteijn; Alex Kairua; Royden Aperau	Fours	England; L 10 - 25	India; L 10 - 20	Fiji; W 15 - 10	—	3	did not advance			

Women

Athlete	Event	Group Stage					Quarterfinal	Semifinal	Final / BM	
Athlete	Event	Opposition Score	Opposition Score	Opposition Score	Opposition Score	Rank	Opposition Score	Opposition Score	Opposition Score	Rank
Nooroa Mataio	Singles	Piketh (RSA); L 14–21	Wilson (NFK); L 13–21	Tikoisuva (FIJ); W 21–6	—	2 Q	Ahmad (MAS); L 14–21	did not advance		
Matapa Puia; Nooroa Mataio	Pairs	Norfolk Island; L 14 - 26	Guernsey; L 10 - 18	Malaysia; L 6 - 22	Malta; W 22 - 15	4	did not advance			
Tiare Jim; Teokotai Jim; Emily Jim	Triples	Wales; W 14-11	Scotland; W 24-13	Botswana; W 15-13	—	1 Q	Fiji; W 23-12	England; L 11-23	New Zealand; L 6-27	4
Matapa Puia; Emily Jim; Tiare Jim; Teokotai Jim	Fours	Canada; W 14–11	India; L 9–15	England; L 7–19	—	3	did not advance			

== Swimming ==
Four swimmers were officially selected on 9 March 2022.

Men

Athlete	Event	Heat		Semifinal		Final	
Athlete	Event	Time	Rank	Time	Rank	Time	Rank
Wesley Roberts	100 m freestyle	50.75	20	did not advance			
Wesley Roberts	200 m freestyle	1:49.83	19	—		did not advance	
Wesley Roberts	400 m freestyle	4:00.62	17	—		did not advance	
Bede Aitu	50 m backstroke	27.89	31	did not advance			
Bede Aitu	100 m backstroke	59.77	26	did not advance			
Bede Aitu	200 m backstroke	2:11.64	16	—		did not advance	

Women

Athlete	Event	Heat		Semifinal		Final	
Athlete	Event	Time	Rank	Time	Rank	Time	Rank
Lanihei Connolly	50 m freestyle	27.30	32	did not advance			
Lanihei Connolly	50 m breaststroke	32.77	13 Q	32.91	14	did not advance	
Lanihei Connolly	100 m breaststroke	1:11.90	15 Q	1:11.76	15	did not advance	
Lanihei Connolly	50 m butterfly	28.84	29	did not advance			
Kirsten Fisher-Marsters	50 m breaststroke	33.61	18	did not advance			
Kirsten Fisher-Marsters	100 m breaststroke	1:15.02	18	did not advance			

Mixed

Athlete	Event	Heat		Final	
Athlete	Event	Time	Rank	Time	Rank
Bede Aitu; Kirsten Fisher-Marsters; Lanihei Connolly; Wesley Roberts	4 × 100 m medley relay	4:13.09	12	did not advance	

== Weightlifting ==
One weightlifter qualified through their position in the IWF Commonwealth Ranking List (as of 9 March 2022).

Women

Athlete	Event	Weight lifted		Total	Rank
Athlete	Event	Snatch	Clean & jerk	Total	Rank
Manine Lynch	+87 kg	86	116	202	7
