= Cycling at the 2022 Commonwealth Games – Qualification =

There was a nominal total of 12 quota places available (in parasport events only) for cycling at the 2022 Commonwealth Games; 6 each for men and women.

== Rules ==
The top five Commonwealth Games Associations (CGAs) in each of the UCI Individual Tandem B – Track Para Rankings qualify one athlete each; however, if fewer than five CGAs make the top fifteen outright, the CGA with the highest-ranked second athlete also receives a second quota place. The last place in each gender group is reserved for a Bipartite Invitation.

All those who qualify must be accompanied by a pilot for the competition, which has no impact on quota allocation.

== Timeline ==
Event	Dates	Location
UCI Individual Tandem B Track Para Rankings	1 January 2021 – 18 April 2022	Various locations

== Events ==
Men's para-track

Means of qualification	Quotas	Qualified
UCI Track Para Ranking	4	Scotland; England; Wales; Ghana
Bipartite Invitation	3	Australia; Kenya; Wales
TOTAL	7	

Women's para-track

Means of qualification	Quotas	Qualified
UCI Track Para Ranking	4	Scotland; England; Scotland; Australia
Bipartite Invitation	1	Wales
TOTAL	5	
