= Gymnastics at the 2022 Commonwealth Games – Women's rhythmic individual ball =

Women's rhythmic individual ball at the 2022 Commonwealth Games
- Venue: Arena Birmingham
- Dates: 6 August 2022
- Competitors: 8 from 7 nations
- Winning score: 29.700

Medalists
gold medal	Ng Joe Ee	Malaysia
silver medal	Suzanna Shahbazian	Canada
bronze medal	Anna Sokolova	Cyprus

The women's rhythmic individual ball gymnastics competition at the 2022 Commonwealth Games in Birmingham, England were held on 6 August 2022 at the Arena Birmingham.

== Schedule ==
The schedule was as follows:

All times are British Summer Time (UTC+1)

Date	Time	Round
Thursday 4 August 2022	12:00	Qualification
Saturday 6 August 2022	10:42	Final

== Results ==
=== Qualification ===
Qualification for this apparatus final was determined within the team final.

=== Final ===
The results are as follows:

Rank	Gymnast	Difficulty	Execution	Penalty	Total
1st place, gold medalist(s)	Ng Joe Ee (MAS)	14.400	7.700		29.700
2nd place, silver medalist(s)	Suzanna Shahbazian (CAN)	12.900	7.900	-0.05	29.050
3rd place, bronze medalist(s)	Anna Sokolova (CYP)	13.100	7.800		28.800
4	Marfa Ekimova (ENG)	12.300	8.100		28.600
5	Alexandra Kiroi-Bogatyreva (AUS)	12.400	8.100		28.600
6	Tatiana Cocsanova (CAN)	12.500	8.000	-0.30	28.200
7	Elizabeth Petrova Popova (WAL)	12.300	6.900		26.600
8	Gemma Frizelle (WAL)	11.000	8.000		26.500
