= Norfolk Island at the 2018 Commonwealth Games =

- Flag of Norfolk Island
- CG code: NFK
- CGA: Norfolk Island Amateur Sports and Commonwealth Games Association

in Gold Coast, Australia 4 April 2018 – 15 April 2018
- Competitors: 18 in 2 sports
- Flag bearer: Hadyn Evans (opening)
- Medals Ranked 39th: Gold 0 Silver 0 Bronze 1 Total 1

Commonwealth Games appearances (overview)
- 1986; 1990; 1994; 1998; 2002; 2006; 2010; 2014; 2018; 2022; 2026; 2030

Norfolk Island competed at the 2018 Commonwealth Games in the Gold Coast, Australia from April 4 to April 15, 2018.

On March 18, 2018, lawn bowler Hadyn Evans was named as the nation's flag bearer at the opening ceremony.

Ryan Dixon, Hadyn Evans and Phillip Jones won the country's first Commonwealth Games medal since 1994, when they won bronze in the men's triples lawn bowls event.

== Medalists ==
Medal	Name	Sport	Event	Date
Bronze	Ryan Dixon; Hadyn Evans; Phillip Jones	Lawn bowls	Men's Triples	April 8

== Competitors ==
The following is the list of number of competitors participating at the Games per sport/discipline.

Sport	Men	Women	Total
Lawn bowls	5	5	10
Shooting	7	1	8
Total	12	6	18

== Lawn bowls ==
Norfolk Island is scheduled to compete in the lawn bowls competition.

Men

Athlete	Event	Group Stage						Quarterfinal	Semifinal	Final / BM	
Athlete	Event	Opposition Score	Opposition Score	Opposition Score	Opposition Score	Opposition Score	Rank	Opposition Score	Opposition Score	Opposition Score	Rank
Phillip Jones	Singles	Salmon (WAL); L 13-21	Paniani (COK); W 21-5	Wilson (AUS); L 18-21	Aquilina (MLT); L 15-21	Breitenbach (RSA); L 13-21	5	did not advance			
John Christian; Timothy Sheridan	Pairs	Samoa; W 23–6	Malaysia; L 7–21	Niue; W 25–9	Scotland; L 12–14	India; W 17–7	3	did not advance			
Ryan Dixon; Hadyn Evans; Phillip Jones	Triples	Northern Ireland; W 21–11	Cook Islands; W 23–10	Scotland; L 11–20	Malaysia; L 4–26	—N/a	2 Q	England; W 19–18	Scotland; L 8–20	Canada; W 19–16	3rd place, bronze medalist(s)
John Christian; Ryan Dixon; Hadyn Evans; Timothy Sheridan	Fours	South Africa; L 7-25	Botswana; W 11-8	Australia; L 10-24	India; L 7-25	—N/a	4	did not advance			

Women

Athlete	Event	Group Stage						Quarterfinal	Semifinal	Final / BM	
Athlete	Event	Opposition Score	Opposition Score	Opposition Score	Opposition Score	Opposition Score	Rank	Opposition Score	Opposition Score	Opposition Score	Rank
Carmen Anderson	Singles	Mataio (COK); W 21–9	Mbugua (KEN); W 21–7	Wimp (PNG); W 21–11	Senna (BOT); W 21–17	McKerihen (CAN); W 21–19	1 Q	Daniels (WAL); L 13–21	did not advance		
Carmen Anderson; Shae Wilson	Pairs	Tonga; W 21 - 10	Canada; W 14 - 12	Fiji; L 11 - 12	New Zealand; W 20 - 11	—N/a	2 Q	Canada; L 6 - 21	did not advance		
Tessie Evans; Christine Jones; Christine Pauling	Triples	Scotland; L 9-16	Malaysia; L 13-24	Cook Islands; L 11-25	—N/a		4	did not advance			
Tessie Evans; Christine Jones; Christine Pauling; Shae Wilson	Fours	South Africa; D 10–10	Jersey; W 21–13	New Zealand; L 5–28	Zambia; L 9–17	—N/a	4	did not advance			

== Shooting ==
Norfolk Island participated with 8 athletes (7 men and 1 woman).

Men

Athlete	Event	Qualification		Final	
Athlete	Event	Points	Rank	Points	Rank
Douglas Creek	50 metre pistol	508	17	did not advance	
Stephen Ryan	50 metre pistol	393	21	did not advance	
Graham Cock	25 metre rapid fire pistol	460	13	did not advance	
Kevin Coulter	10 metre air pistol	480	23	did not advance	
Douglas Creek	10 metre air pistol	523	20	did not advance	
Clinton Judd	Trap	100	31	did not advance	
Mitchell Meers	Trap	81	36	did not advance	
Clinton Judd	Double trap	91	21	did not advance	
Brancker South	Double trap	107	18	did not advance	
Mitchell Meers	Skeet	91	14	did not advance	
Brancker South	Skeet	86	15	did not advance	

Women

Athlete	Event	Qualification		Final	
Athlete	Event	Points	Rank	Points	Rank
Jacqueline Grundy	25 metre pistol	472	14	did not advance	
Jacqueline Grundy	10 metre air pistol	344	20	did not advance	
