= Gymnastics at the 2022 Commonwealth Games – Women's rhythmic individual clubs =

Women's rhythmic individual clubs at the 2022 Commonwealth Games
- Venue: Arena Birmingham
- Dates: 6 August 2022
- Competitors: 8 from 8 nations
- Winning score: 29.400

Medalists
gold medal	Alexandra Kiroi-Bogatyreva	Australia
silver medal	Carmel Kallemaa	Canada
bronze medal	Izzah Amzan	Malaysia

The Women's rhythmic individual clubs gymnastics competition at the 2022 Commonwealth Games in Birmingham, England was held on 6 August 2022 at the Arena Birmingham.

== Schedule ==
The schedule was as follows:

All times are British Summer Time (UTC+1)

Date	Time	Round
Thursday 4 August 2022	12:00	Qualification
Saturday 6 August 2022	11:22	Final

== Results ==
=== Qualification ===
Qualification for this apparatus final was determined within the team final.

=== Final ===
The results are as follows:

Rank	Gymnast	Difficulty	Execution	Penalty	Total
1st place, gold medalist(s)	Alexandra Kiroi-Bogatyreva (AUS)	13.400	7.800		29.400
2nd place, silver medalist(s)	Carmel Kallemaa (CAN)	12.900	8.200		29.100
3rd place, bronze medalist(s)	Izzah Amzan (MAS)	12.800	7.800		28.600
4	Havana Hopman (NZL)	12.300	7.900	-0.30	27.800
5	Elizabeth Petrova Popova (WAL)	12.200	7.600		27.700
6	Louise Christie (SCO)	11.600	7.900	-0.05	27.550
7	Anna Sokolova (CYP)	13.000	6.600		27.300
8	Saffron Severn (ENG)	10.400	7.200	-0.05	25.450
