= Boxing at the 2022 Commonwealth Games – Men's heavyweight =

Boxing competitions

Boxing – Men's heavyweight at the 2022 Commonwealth Games
- Venue: National Exhibition Centre Hall 4
- Dates: July 30 – 7 August 2022
- Competitors: 10 from 10 nations

Medalists
gold medal	Lewis Williams	England
silver medal	Ato Plodzicki-Faoagali	Samoa
bronze medal	Edgardo Coumi	Australia
bronze medal	Duken Tutakitoa-Williams	Niue

The Men's heavyweight boxing competitions at the 2022 Commonwealth Games in Birmingham, England took place between Juley 30 and August 7 at National Exhibition Centre Hall 4. Heavyweights were limited to those boxers weighing between 86 and 92 kilograms.

Like all Commonwealth boxing events, the competition was a straight single-elimination tournament. Both semifinal losers were awarded bronze medals, so no boxers competed again after their first loss. Bouts consisted of three rounds of three minutes each, with one-minute breaks between rounds.

== Schedule ==
The schedule is as follows:

Date	Round
Saturday 30 July	Preliminaries
Thursday 4 August	Quarter-finals
Saturday 6 August	Semi-finals
Sunday 7 August 2022	Final

== Results ==
The draw is as follows:

=== Bracket ===
Preliminaries
Lewis Williams (ENG)	5
Nazeer Khan (PAK)	0
Ato Plodzicki-Faoagali (SAM)	3
Sanjeet Sanjeet (IND)	2

Quarterfinals
Arthur Lavalou (PNG)
Lewis Williams (ENG)	RSC
Japheth Olton (AIA)
Edgardo Coumi (AUS)	RSC
Duken Tutakitoa-Williams (NIU)	RSC
Michael Schuster (COK)
Ato Plodzicki-Faoagali (SAM)	RSC
Andy Andall (GRN)

Semifinals
Lewis Williams (ENG)	5
Edgardo Coumi (AUS)	0
Duken Tutakitoa-Williams (NIU)	0
Ato Plodzicki-Faoagali (SAM)	5

Final
Lewis Williams (ENG)	5
Ato Plodzicki-Faoagali (SAM)	0
