= Lawn bowls at the 2018 Commonwealth Games – Men's triples =

Bowls event

Lawn bowls men's triples at the 2018 Commonwealth Games
- Venue: Broadbeach Bowls Club
- Dates: 5 – 8 April 2018
- Competitors: 60 from 20 nations

Medalists
gold medal	Darren Burnett; Derek Oliver; Ronnie Duncan	Scotland
silver medal	Aron Sherriff; Barrie Lester; Nathan Rice	Australia
bronze medal	Hadyn Evans; Phil Jones; Ryan Dixon	Norfolk Island

Lawn bowls men's triples at the 2018 Commonwealth Games was held at the Broadbeach Bowls Club in the Gold Coast, Australia from April 5 to 8. A total of 60 athletes from 20 associations participated in the event. Scotland won the gold medal, defeating Australia in the final. Norfolk Island the bronze medal.

== Sectional play ==
The top two from each section advance to the knockout stage.

=== Section A ===
Rank	Nation	Athletes	MP	MW	MT	ML	FR	AG	PD	PTS
1	England	David Bolt, Jamie Chestney, Robert Paxton	4	4	0	0	80	49	31	12
2	Wales	Jonathan Tomlinson, Ross Owen, Steve Harris	4	3	0	1	88	42	46	9
3	India	Chandan Singh, Dinesh Kumar, Sunil Bahadur	4	2	0	2	57	66	-9	6
4	South Africa	Gerry Baker, Morgan Muvhango, Rudi Jacobs	4	1	0	3	52	79	-27	0
5	Papua New Guinea	Fred Koesan, Manu Walo, Polin Pomaleu	4	0	0	4	42	83	-41	0

	England	Wales	India	South Africa	Papua New Guinea
England	—	17–16	15–14	24–13	24–6
Wales	16–17	—	23–9	22–6	27–10
India	14–15	9–23	—	18–17	16–11
South Africa	13–24	6–22	17–18	—	16–15
Papua New Guinea	6–24	10–27	11–16	15–16	—

=== Section B ===
Rank	Nation	Athletes	MP	MW	MT	ML	FR	AG	PD	PTS
1	Jersey	Derek Boswell, Malcolm De Sousa, Ross Davis	4	3	1	0	79	43	36	10
2	Australia	Aron Sherriff, Barrie Lester, Nathan Rice	4	3	0	1	108	32	76	9
3	Fiji	Arun Kumar, Kushal Pillay, Semesa Naiseruvati	4	2	0	2	46	71	-25	6
4	Botswana	John Gaborutwe, Kabo Gaboutloeloe, Nixon Senna	4	1	0	3	37	95	-58	3
5	Brunei	Abdul Rahman bin Haji Omar, Haji Naim Brahim, Mohd Israt	4	0	1	3	42	71	-29	1

	Jersey	Australia	Fiji	Botswana	Brunei
Jersey	—	21–18	20–10	27–4	11–11
Australia	18–21	—	28–3	33–4	29–4
Fiji	10–20	3–28	—	19–12	14–11
Botswana	4–27	4–33	12–19	—	17–16
Brunei	11–11	4–29	11–14	16–17	—

=== Section C ===
Rank	Nation	Athletes	MP	MW	MT	ML	FR	AG	PD	PTS
1	New Zealand	Ali Forsyth, Michael Nagy, Paul Girdler	4	4	0	0	110	35	75	12
2	Canada	Cam Lefresne, Chris Stadnyk, Greg Wilson	4	2	0	2	60	53	7	6
3	Namibia	Carel Olivier, Douw Calitz, Willem Esterhuizen	4	2	0	2	64	69	-5	6
4	Singapore	Anthony Loh, Foo Meng Yin, Pang Heng Heck	4	2	0	2	62	68	-6	6
5	Niue	Des Hipa, Hala Funaki, Keith Papani	4	0	0	4	37	108	-71	0

	New Zealand	Canada	Namibia	Singapore	Niue
New Zealand	—	18–13	28–8	28–6	36–8
Canada	13–18	—	11–16	13–12	23–7
Namibia	8–28	16–11	—	15–20	25–10
Singapore	6–28	12–13	20–15	—	24–12
Niue	8-36	7-23	10-25	12-24	—

=== Section D ===
Rank	Nation	Athletes	MP	MW	MT	ML	FR	AG	PD	PTS
1	Scotland	Darren Burnett, Derek Oliver, Ronnie Duncan	4	2	1	1	78	55	23	7
2	Norfolk Island	Hadyn Evans, Phil Jones, Ryan Dixon	4	2	0	2	59	67	-8	6
3	Cook Islands	Wichman-Rairoa, Lawrence Paniani, Munokokura Pita	4	2	0	2	55	77	-22	6
4	Malaysia	Syamil Syazwan Ramli, Soufi Rusli, Zulhilmie Redzuan	4	1	2	1	69	53	16	5
5	Northern Ireland	Andrew Kyle, Martin McHugh, Simon Martin	4	1	1	2	60	69	-9	4

	Scotland	Norfolk Island	Cook Islands	Malaysia	Northern Ireland
Scotland	—	20–11	27–11	17–17	14–16
Norfolk Island	11–20	—	23–10	4–26	21–11
Cook Islands	11–27	10–23	—	16–10	18–17
Malaysia	17–17	26–4	10–16	—	16–16
Northern Ireland	16–14	11–21	17–18	16–16	—

== Knockout stage ==
Quarterfinals
A1	England	18
D2	Norfolk Island	19
D1	Scotland	15
A2	Wales	13
B1	Jersey	7
C2	Canada	17
C1	New Zealand	10
B2	Australia	25

Semifinals
D2	Norfolk Island	8
D1	Scotland	20
C2	Canada	5
B2	Australia	20

Final
D1	Scotland	19
B2	Australia	14
Third place
D2	Norfolk Island	19
C2	Canada	16
