= Lawn bowls at the 2022 Commonwealth Games – Men's triples =

Bowls event

Lawn bowls men's triples at the 2022 Commonwealth Games
- Venue: Victoria Park
- Dates: 29 July – 1 August 2022
- Competitors: 48 from 16 nations

Medalists
gold medal	Louis Ridout; Nick Brett; Jamie Chestney	England
silver medal	Barrie Lester; Carl Healey; Ben Twist	Australia
bronze medal	Owain Dando; Ross Owen; Jonathan Tomlinson	Wales

Lawn bowls at the 2022 Commonwealth Games – Men's triples was held at the Victoria Park from July 29 to August 1. A total of 48 athletes from 16 associations participated in the event. England won the gold medal, defeating Australia in the final. Wales won the bronze medal.

== Sectional play ==
The top two from each section advance to the knockout stage.

=== Section A ===
Rank	Nation	Athletes	MP	MW	MT	ML	FR	AG	PD	PTS
1	Scotland	Stewart Anderson, Iain McLean, Darren Burnett	3	3	0	0	62	32	+32	9
2	Malta	Peter John Ellul, Troy Lorimer, Shaun Parnis	3	1	1	1	44	56	–12	4
3	New Zealand	Andrew Kelly, Mike Galloway, Ali Forsyth	3	1	0	2	49	43	+6	3
4	India	Navneet Singh, Mridul Borgohain, Chandan Kumar Singh	3	0	1	2	34	58	–24	1

	India	Malta	New Zealand	Scotland
India	—	16–16	6–23	12–19
Malta	16–16	—	22–12	6–28
New Zealand	23–6	12–22	—	14–15
Scotland	19–12	28–6	15–14	—

=== Section B ===
Rank	Nation	Athletes	MP	MW	MT	ML	FR	AG	PD	PTS
1	Australia	Barrie Lester, Carl Healey, Ben Twist	3	3	0	0	69	36	+33	9
2	Jersey	Scott Ruderham, Greg Davis, Malcolm De Sousa	3	2	0	1	59	35	+24	6
3	Cook Islands	Royden Aperau, Aidan Zittersteijn, Jason Lindsay	3	1	0	2	50	61	–11	3
4	Niue	Leslie Lagatule, Norman Mitimeti, Kolonisi Polima	3	0	0	3	33	79	–46	0

	Australia	Cook Islands	Jersey	Niue
Australia	—	25–15	15–14	29–7
Cook Islands	15–25	—	11–19	24–17
Jersey	14–15	19–11	—	26–9
Niue	7–29	17–24	9–26	—

=== Section C ===
Rank	Nation	Athletes	MP	MW	MT	ML	FR	AG	PD	PTS
1	Fiji	Martin Fong, David Aitcheson, Semesa Naiseruvati	3	3	0	0	53	39	+14	9
2	Wales	Owain Dando, Ross Owen, Jonathan Tomlinson	3	1	1	1	58	38	+20	4
3	Northern Ireland	Adam McKeown, Gary Kelly, Ian McClure	3	1	1	1	54	45	+11	4
4	Norfolk Island	Trevor Gow, Hadyn Evans, Ryan Dixon	3	0	0	3	32	75	–43	0

	Fiji	Norfolk Island	Northern Ireland	Wales
Fiji	—	20–12	20–15	13–12
Norfolk Island	12–20	—	10–24	10–31
Northern Ireland	15–20	24–10	—	15–15
Wales	12–13	31–10	15–15	—

=== Section D ===
Rank	Nation	Athletes	MP	MW	MT	ML	FR	AG	PD	PTS
1	England	Louis Ridout, Nick Brett, Jamie Chestney	3	3	0	0	71	34	+37	9
2	Malaysia	Izzat Dzulkeple, Syamil Syazwan Ramli, Soufi Rusli	3	1	0	2	39	44	–5	3
3	South Africa	Bradley Robinson, Petrus Breitenbach, Jason Evans	3	1	0	2	41	51	–10	3
4	Canada	Robert Law, Greg Wilson, Cam Lefresne	3	1	0	2	39	61	–22	3

	Canada	England	Malaysia	South Africa
Canada	—	8–36	14–15	17–10
England	36–8	—	13–12	22–14
Malaysia	15–14	12–13	—	12–17
South Africa	10–17	14–22	17–12	—

== Knockout stage ==
Quarterfinals
A1	Scotland	12
D2	Wales	17
D1	England	16
A2	Jersey	11
B1	Australia	24
C2	Malaysia	14
C1	Fiji	15
B2	Malta	14

Semifinals
D2	Wales	5
D1	England	15
B1	Australia	26
C1	Fiji	13

Final
D1	England	14
B1	Australia	12
Third place
D2	Wales	21
C1	Fiji	7
