= Pacific Subtropical Islands =

The Pacific Subtropical Islands is an interim Australian bioregion which includes Norfolk Island and Lord Howe Island. Its IBRA code is PSI.

Norfolk and Lord Howe Islands constitute the Norfolk Islands, a Level 3 biogeographic unit (aka botanical country) in the World Geographical Scheme for Recording Plant Distributions.

== Subregions ==
IBRA regions and subregions: IBRA7
IBRA region / subregion	IBRA code	Area	States	Location in Australia
Pacific Subtropical Islands	PSI	5,817 hectares (14,370 acres)		
Lord Howe Island	PSI01	1,909 hectares (4,720 acres)	NSW	
Norfolk Island	PSI02	3,908 hectares (9,660 acres)	Norfolk Island	

== See also ==
- Geography of Australia
