= Owain Dando =

Welsh bowls player

Personal information
- Nationality: British (Welsh)
- Born: 18 November 1990 (age 35) Abergavenny, Wales

Sport
- Sport: Lawn Bowls
- Club: RTB Ebbw Vale
Medal record
Representing Wales
Commonwealth Games
Bronze medal – third place	2022 Birmingham	triples
European Bowls Championships
Bronze medal – third place	2019 Guernsey	Pairs
Bronze medal – third place	2026 Wales	Fours
IIBC Championships
Gold medal – first place	2010	U25 mixed pairs
Welsh National Bowls Championships
Gold medal – first place	2026	Men’s open singles
Silver medal – second place	2024	Welsh National Bowling Championships Pairs
Silver medal – second place	2014	Welsh National Bowling Championships fours
British Isles Indoor Bowls Championships
Gold medal – first place	2012 Swansea	Pairs
Gold medal – first place	2014 Stanley	Fours

Owain Dando (born 18 November 1990) is a Welsh international lawn bowler. He has represented Wales at the Commonwealth Games and won a bronze medal.

== Biography ==
Dando a police office by trade won the silver medal in the Men's fours at the 2014 Welsh National Bowls Championships. Dando who bowls for the RTB Ebbw Vale BC was selected for the Welsh Elite squad in 2019. Dando won bronze medal in the men's pairs at the 2019 European Championships in Guernsey alongside Daniel Davies.

In 2022, he was selected for the 2022 Commonwealth Games in Birmingham where he competed in two events; the men's triples, where he won a bronze medal and the men's fours.

In 2023, he was selected as part of the team to represent Wales at the 2023 World Outdoor Bowls Championship. He participated in the men's triples and the men's fours events.

2024 Dando along with team mate Stephen Harris lost in the final of the Welsh National Outdoor Pairs Championship by 1 shot to Tenby pair coming away with a Silver Medal

Owain became the Welsh National Bowls Championships Outdoor Singles Champion in 2026, Dando will now represent Wales in the 2027 British Isles Singles and World Champion of Champions.
