= Phillip Jones (bowls) =

Norfolk Islander lawn bowler (born 1955)

Personal information
- Nationality: Norfolk Islander
- Born: 15 April 1955 (age 71) Young, New South Wales

Sport
- Sport: Lawn bowls
Medal record
Representing Norfolk Island
Commonwealth Games
Bronze medal – third place	2018 Gold Coast	Men's triples

Phillip Darrell Jones (born 15 April 1955) is a Norfolk Island international lawn bowler.

He was born in Young, New South Wales and represented Norfolk Island in the 2014 Commonwealth Games.

He was selected as part of the Norfolk Island team for the 2018 Commonwealth Games on the Gold Coast in Queensland where he took a bronze medal in the Triples with Hadyn Evans and Ryan Dixon.
