= Hadyn Evans =

Norfolk Island lawn bowler (born 1962)

Personal information
- Nationality: Norfolk Islander
- Born: 15 October 1962 (age 64) Hamilton, New Zealand

Sport
- Sport: Lawn bowls
Medal record
Representing Norfolk Island
Commonwealth Games
Bronze medal – third place	2018 Gold Coast	Men's triples

Hadyn Paul "Teddy" Evans (born 15 October 1962) is a Norfolk Island businessman, actor and local government politician. He is also an international lawn bowler.

== Biography ==
Evans was born in Hamilton, New Zealand, as an "eighth-generation descendant of the Bounty mutineers". He was educated at the Norfolk Island Central School. Evans runs a boutique piggery and market garden in Anson Bay. He took up acting relatively late in life and has appeared in a number of theatre productions both on the island and in mainland Australia. In March 2013, Evans was elected to the Norfolk Island Legislative Assembly as an independent candidate. He remained a member until the assembly's abolition in June 2015.

== Lawn bowls ==
Evans is a lawn bowls player, and was selected as part of the Norfolk Island team for the 2018 Commonwealth Games on the Gold Coast in Queensland. He won a bronze medal in the Triples with Phillip Jones and Ryan Dixon. He was also given the honour of being the Norfolk Island flag bearer at the opening ceremony.

In 2020, he was selected for the 2020 World Outdoor Bowls Championship in Australia but the event was cancelled due to the COVID-19 pandemic. In 2022, he competed in the men's triples and the men's fours at the 2022 Commonwealth Games.

In 2023, he was selected as part of the team to represent the Norfolk Islands at the 2023 World Outdoor Bowls Championship. He participated in the men's triples and the men's fours events.
