= Callum Carson =

Welsh rugby union player

- Born: Callum Iestyn Carson; 13 March 1999 (age 27) Aberdare, Wales
- Height: 175 cm (5 ft 9 in)
- Weight: 85 kg (187 lb; 13 st 5 lb)

Rugby union career
- Position: Centre
Amateur team(s)
Years	Team	Apps	(Points)
2022-	Aberavon		
Senior career
Years	Team	Apps	(Points)
2020–2022	Ospreys	3	(0)
- Correct as of 14 March 2021
International career
Years	Team	Apps	(Points)
2018	Wales U20s	5	(5)
2020	Wales Sevens	10	(5)
- Correct as of 2 November 2020

Callum Iestyn Carson (born 13 March 1999) is a Welsh rugby union player, currently playing for Welsh Premier Division side Aberavon. His preferred position is centre.

On 10 June 2022, Carson was announced by Aberavon to be the newest addition to their squad.

== Ospreys ==
Carson has represented Wales at both U20 level and more recently in Sevens, participating in two tournaments of the 2019–20 World Rugby Sevens Series. He was named in the Ospreys side for Round 4 of the 2020–21 Pro14 against Zebre.

On 1 July 2022, Carson was officially released by the Ospreys for the involvement in an incident revolving around the mocking of a rough sleeper.

== Wales sevens ==
Carson competed for Wales at the 2022 Rugby World Cup Sevens in Cape Town.
