= Duken Tutakitoa-Williams =

Niuean boxer (born 1998)

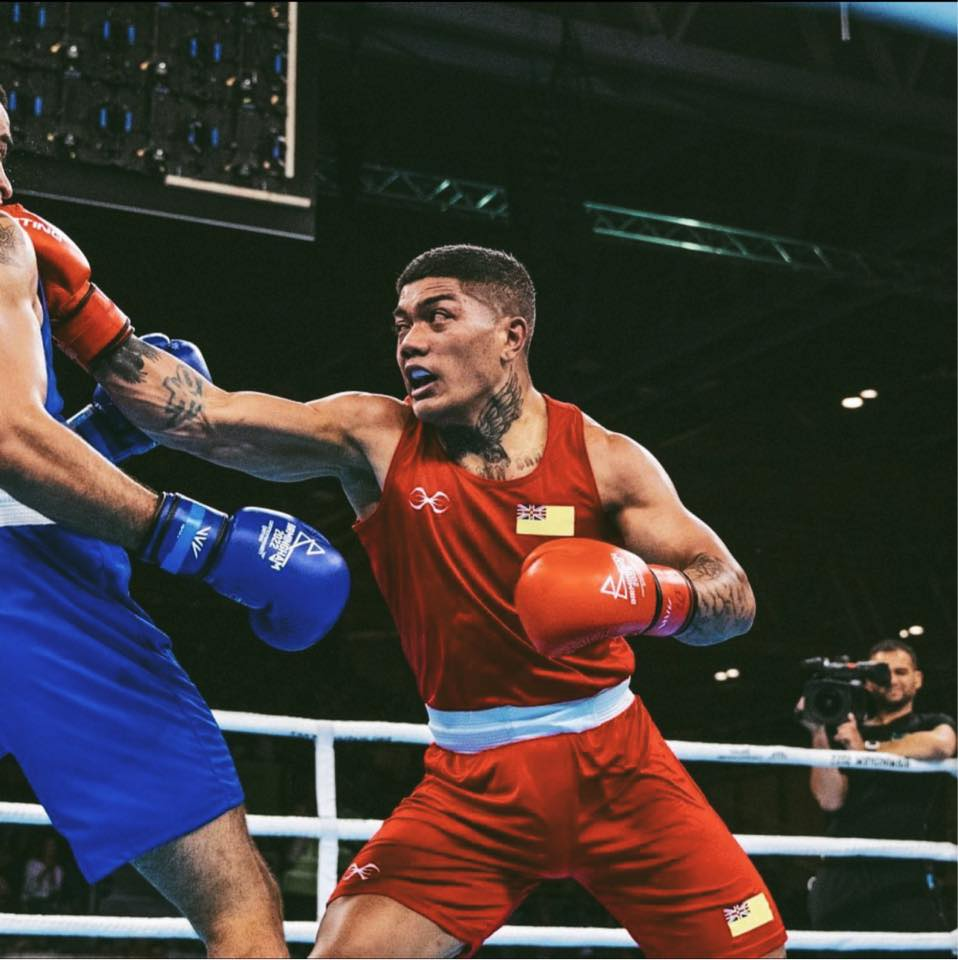
- Niue's first ever medal from the Commonwealth Games Birmingham 2022

Personal information
- Nationality: Niue; New Zealand
- Born: Duken Holo Tutakitoa-Williams; 17 August 1998 New Zealand
- Height: 185 cm (6 ft 1 in)
- Weight: 89.9 kg (198 lb)

Boxing career
- Weight class: Cruiserweight (Professional); Heavyweight(Amateur)

Boxing record
- Total fights: 2
- Wins: 2
- Win by KO: 0
- Losses: 0
- Draws: 0
Medal record
Men's Boxing
Representing Niue
Commonwealth Games
Bronze medal – third place	2022 Birmingham	Men's heavyweight
Pacific Games
Gold medal – first place	2023 Honiara	Men's cruiserweight

Duken Holo Tutakitoa-Williams (born 17 August 1998) is a Niuean boxer and the first Niuean athlete to win a medal in the Commonwealth Games.

== Personal life ==
Williams is from the village of Liku, Niue.

== Amateur boxing career ==
In April 2022, he won the New Zealand national cruiserweight title.

In June 2022, he was selected for Niue's team for the 2022 Commonwealth Games in Birmingham. At the games he defeated the Cook Islands' Michael Schuster to secure a place in the heavyweight semi-final. The victory guaranteed him at least the bronze, making him Niue's first Commonwealth games medalist.

In October 2023, he was announced for the Niue squad in the 2023 Pacific Games. Later that month, his house was raided by police and his assets were frozen. Due to his sponsors pulling out, he was forced to fundraiser money to pay for his own plane ticket to the games in Honiara. Williams won the gold medal in the 81–86 kg division after defeating Gabriel Dalphin in the final.
