= Ryan Dixon =

Norfolk Island lawn bowler (born 1978)

Personal information
- Nationality: Norfolk Islander
- Born: 2 December 1978 (age 47) Gosford, New South Wales, Australia

Sport
- Sport: Lawn bowls
- Club: Norfolk Island Bowling Club
Medal record
Men's lawn bowls
Representing Norfolk Island
Commonwealth Games
Bronze medal – third place	2018 Gold Coast	Men's triples

Ryan Dixon (born 2 December 1978) is a Norfolk Island international lawn bowler.

== Biography ==
He was born in Gosford, New South Wales and was selected as part of the Norfolk Island team for the 2018 Commonwealth Games on the Gold Coast in Queensland where he took a bronze medal in the Triples with Phil Jones and Hadyn Evans.

In 2020, he was selected for the 2020 World Outdoor Bowls Championship in Australia but the event was cancelled due to the COVID-19 pandemic. In 2022, he competed in the men's singles and the men's triples at the 2022 Commonwealth Games.

In 2023, he was selected as part of the team to represent the Norfolk Islands at the 2023 World Outdoor Bowls Championship. He participated in the men's triples and the men's fours events.
