= Boxing at the 2022 Commonwealth Games =

- Venue: National Exhibition Centre Hall 4
- Dates: 29 July – 7 August 2022
- Competitors: 231 from 55 nations

Boxing at the 2022 Commonwealth Games was the 22nd appearance of the Boxing at the Commonwealth Games. The boxing events were held in Birmingham, England, at the National Exhibition Centre Hall 4. It is one of the founding sports, having featured in every edition of the Games since the inaugural 1930 edition; the boxing competition took place in England for the third time.

The competition is scheduled to take place between 29 July and 7 August 2022, spread across sixteen events.

== Schedule ==
The competition schedule was as follows:

P	Preliminary matches	¼	Quarter-finals	½	Semi-finals	F	Final

Date Event	Fri 29		Sat 30		Sun 31		Mon 1		Tue 2		Wed 3		Thu 4		Sat 6			Sun 7		
Session →	A	E	A	E	A	E	A	E	A	E	A	E	A	E	M	A	E	M	A	E
Men's flyweight											¼		¼		½			F		
Men's bantamweight											¼		¼			½			F	
Men's featherweight											¼		¼				½			F
Men's light welterweight											¼		¼			½			F	
Men's welterweight											¼		¼				½			F
Men's light middleweight											¼		¼			½			F	
Men's middleweight											¼		¼		½			F		
Men's light heavyweight											¼		¼		½			F		
Men's heavyweight											¼		¼			½			F	
Men's super heavyweight											¼		¼				½			F
Women's minimumweight											¼		¼		½			F		
Women's light flyweight											¼		¼			½			F	
Women's featherweight											¼		¼				½			F
Women's lightweight											¼		¼			½			F	
Women's light middleweight											¼		¼		½			F		
Women's middleweight											¼		¼				½			F

== Venue ==
The boxing competition was held at the National Exhibition Centre in Solihull. Five other sports - badminton, netball, para powerlifting, table tennis, and weightlifting - also took place there.

== Medal summary ==
=== Medal table ===
* Host nation (England)

Rank	CGA	Gold	Silver	Bronze	Total
1	Northern Ireland	5	1	1	7
2	India	3	1	3	7
3	Scotland	3	0	2	5
4	England*	2	3	3	8
5	Wales	2	1	3	6
6	Canada	1	0	3	4
7	Australia	0	2	3	5
8	Ghana	0	2	1	3
8	Mozambique	0	2	1	3
10	Nigeria	0	1	3	4
11	Zambia	0	1	1	2
12	Mauritius	0	1	0	1
12	Samoa	0	1	0	1
14	South Africa	0	0	2	2
14	Tanzania	0	0	2	2
16	Botswana	0	0	1	1
16	New Zealand	0	0	1	1
16	Niue	0	0	1	1
16	Uganda	0	0	1	1
Totals (19 entries)		16	16	32	64

=== Men ===
Event	Gold	Silver	Bronze
Flyweight	Amit Panghal; India	Kiaran MacDonald; England	Patrick Chinyemba; Zambia
Flyweight	Amit Panghal; India	Kiaran MacDonald; England	Jake Dodd; Wales
Bantamweight	Dylan Eagleson; Northern Ireland	Abraham Mensah; Ghana	Matthew McHale; Scotland
Bantamweight	Dylan Eagleson; Northern Ireland	Abraham Mensah; Ghana	Owain Harris-Allan; Wales
Featherweight	Jude Gallagher; Northern Ireland	Joseph Commey; Ghana	Mohammad Hussamuddin; India
Featherweight	Jude Gallagher; Northern Ireland	Joseph Commey; Ghana	Keoma-Ali Al-Ahmadieh; Canada
Light welterweight	Reese Lynch; Scotland	Richarno Colin; Mauritius	Wyatt Sanford; Canada
Light welterweight	Reese Lynch; Scotland	Richarno Colin; Mauritius	Abdul Omar; Ghana
Welterweight	Ioan Croft; Wales	Stephen Zimba; Zambia	Tyler Jolly; Scotland
Welterweight	Ioan Croft; Wales	Stephen Zimba; Zambia	Rohit Tokas; India
Light middleweight	Aidan Walsh; Northern Ireland	Tiago Muxanga; Mozambique	Garan Croft; Wales
Light middleweight	Aidan Walsh; Northern Ireland	Tiago Muxanga; Mozambique	Kassim Mbundwike; Tanzania
Middleweight	Sam Hickey; Scotland	Callum Peters; Australia	Lewis Richardson; England
Middleweight	Sam Hickey; Scotland	Callum Peters; Australia	Simnikiwe Bongco; South Africa
Light heavyweight	Sean Lazzerini; Scotland	Taylor Bevan; Wales	Yusuf Changalawe; Tanzania
Light heavyweight	Sean Lazzerini; Scotland	Taylor Bevan; Wales	Aaron Bowen; England
Heavyweight	Lewis Williams; England	Ato Plodzicki-Faoagali; Samoa	Edgardo Coumi; Australia
Heavyweight	Lewis Williams; England	Ato Plodzicki-Faoagali; Samoa	Duken Tutakitoa-Williams; Niue
Super heavyweight	Delicious Orie; England	Sagar Ahlawat; India	Ifeanyi Onyekwere; Nigeria
Super heavyweight	Delicious Orie; England	Sagar Ahlawat; India	Leuila Mau'u; New Zealand

=== Women ===
Event	Gold	Silver	Bronze
Minimumweight	Nitu Ghanghas; India	Demie-Jade Resztan; England	Priyanka Dhillon; Canada
Minimumweight	Nitu Ghanghas; India	Demie-Jade Resztan; England	Lethabo Modukanele; Botswana
Light flyweight	Nikhat Zareen; India	Carly McNaul; Northern Ireland	Teddy Nakimuli; Uganda
Light flyweight	Nikhat Zareen; India	Carly McNaul; Northern Ireland	Savannah Stubley; England
Featherweight	Michaela Walsh; Northern Ireland	Elizabeth Oshoba; Nigeria	Phiwokuhle Mnguni; South Africa
Featherweight	Michaela Walsh; Northern Ireland	Elizabeth Oshoba; Nigeria	Tina Rahimi; Australia
Lightweight	Amy Broadhurst; Northern Ireland	Gemma Richardson; England	Jaismine Lamboria; India
Lightweight	Amy Broadhurst; Northern Ireland	Gemma Richardson; England	Cynthia Ogunsemilore; Nigeria
Light middleweight	Rosie Eccles; Wales	Kaye Scott; Australia	Alcinda Panguana; Mozambique
Light middleweight	Rosie Eccles; Wales	Kaye Scott; Australia	Eireann Nugent; Northern Ireland
Middleweight	Tammara Thibeault; Canada	Rady Gramane; Mozambique	Jacinta Umunnakwe; Nigeria
Middleweight	Tammara Thibeault; Canada	Rady Gramane; Mozambique	Caitlin Parker; Australia

== Participating nations ==
There were 55 participating Commonwealth Games Associations (CGAs) in boxing with a total of 231 athletes (172 men and 59 women). The number of athletes a nation entered is in parentheses.

- Anguilla (2)
- Antigua and Barbuda (1)
- Australia (11)
- Bahamas (2)
- Bangladesh (3)
- Barbados (3)
- Botswana (5)
- Cameroon (4)
- Canada (6)
- Cayman Islands (1)
- Cook Islands (2)
- Cyprus (2)
- England (14)
- Fiji (2)
- Eswatini (2)
- The Gambia (1)
- Ghana (9)
- Grenada (2)
- Guernsey (1)
- Guyana (3)
- India (12)
- Isle of Man (2)
- Jamaica (2)
- Jersey (1)
- Kenya (4)
- Kiribati (4)
- Lesotho (5)
- Malawi (3)
- Malaysia (2)
- Mauritius (6)
- Mozambique (5)
- Namibia (2)
- Nauru (2)
- New Zealand (8)
- Nigeria (9)
- Niue (4)
- Northern Ireland (12)
- Pakistan (4)
- Papua New Guinea (6)
- Saint Lucia (3)
- Samoa (3)
- Scotland (8)
- Seychelles (3)
- Sierra Leone (4)
- Solomon Islands (1)
- South Africa (3)
- Sri Lanka (8)
- Tanzania (3)
- Tonga (1)
- Trinidad and Tobago (3)
- Tuvalu (2)
- Uganda (6)
- Vanuatu (1)
- Wales (9)
- Zambia (4)
