= Ghana at the 2022 Commonwealth Games =

- Flag of Ghana
- CGF code: GHA
- CGA: Ghana Olympic Committee
- Website: ghanaolympic.org

in Birmingham, England 28 July 2022 – 8 August 2022
- Competitors: 99 (59 men and 40 women) in 13 sports
- Medals Ranked 28th: Gold 0 Silver 2 Bronze 3 Total 5

Commonwealth Games appearances (overview)
- 1954; 1958; 1962; 1966; 1970; 1974; 1978; 1982; 1986; 1990; 1994; 1998; 2002; 2006; 2010; 2014; 2018; 2022; 2026; 2030

Ghana took part in the 2022 Commonwealth Games in Birmingham, England between 28 July and 8 August 2022. It was Ghana's seventeenth appearance at the Games.

== Medalists ==
Medal	Name	Sport	Event	Date
Silver	Abraham Mensah	Boxing	Men's bantamweight	7 August
Silver	Joseph Commey	Boxing	Men's featherweight	7 August
Bronze	Joseph Amoah	Athletics	Men's 200 m	6 August
Bronze	Abdul Omar	Boxing	Men's light welterweight	6 August
Bronze	Deborah Acquah	Athletics	Women's long jump	7 August

== Competitors ==
Ghana received a quota of 40 open allocation slots from Commonwealth Sport. This quota is used to determine the overall team in sports lacking a qualifying system.

The following is the list of number of competitors participating at the Games per sport/discipline.

Sport	Men	Women	Total
Athletics	7	7	14
Badminton	3	2	5
Beach volleyball	0	2	2
Boxing	8	1	9
Cycling	7	2	9 (Note: Plus one guide.)
Hockey	18	18	36
Judo	5	0	5
Para powerlifting	1	1	2
Squash	2	0	2
Swimming	2	3	5
Table tennis	4	2	6
Triathlon	1	1	2
Weightlifting	1	1	2
Total	59	40	99

== Athletics ==
A squad of fourteen athletes was selected on 14 June 2022. Among those selected is 2014 Youth Olympic 800 metres champion Martha Bissah, who until recently was indefinitely banned from representing Ghana as punishment for accusing the GAA of extortion.

Men
Track and road events

Athlete	Event	Heat		Semifinal		Final	
Athlete	Event	Result	Rank	Result	Rank	Result	Rank
Benjamin Azamati-Kwaku	100 m	10.19	1 Q	10.18	3 q	10.16	4
Sean Safo-Antwi	100 m	10.33	4 q	10.36	5	did not advance	
Abdul-Rasheed Saminu	200 m	21.32	3	did not advance			
Joseph Amoah	200 m	20.58	1 Q	20.51	2 Q	20.49	3rd place, bronze medalist(s)
Alex Amankwah	800 m	1:48.26	3 q	—N/a		1:48.95	7
William Amponsah	5000 m	—N/a				13:51.63	13
Sean Safo-Antwi; Benjamin Azamati; Barnabas Aggerh; Joseph Amoah	4 × 100 m relay	DSQ		—N/a		did not advance	

Women
Track and road events

Athlete	Event	Heat		Final	
Athlete	Event	Result	Rank	Result	Rank
Mary Boakye; Latifa Ali; Gifty Oku; Halutie Hor	4 × 100 m relay	44.32	5 q	44.86	7

Field events

Athlete	Event	Qualification		Final	
Athlete	Event	Distance	Rank	Distance	Rank
Abigail Kwarteng	High jump	1.81	1 q	1.89	5
Rose Amoanimaa Yeboah	High jump	1.81	12 q	1.85	7
Deborah Acquah	Long jump	6.85	1 Q	6.94	3rd place, bronze medalist(s)

== Badminton ==
Singles

Athlete	Event	Round of 64	Round of 32	Round of 16	Quarterfinal	Semifinal	Final / BM	
Athlete	Event	Opposition Score	Opposition Score	Opposition Score	Opposition Score	Opposition Score	Opposition Score	Rank
Ahmad Abdul-Samad	Men's singles	Bangura (SLE); W (21–1, 21–1)	Rasheed (MDV); L (16–21, 14–21)	Did not advance				
Kelvin Alphous	Men's singles	Bye	Smith (SCO); L (6–21, 7–21)	Did not advance				
Aaron Tamakloe	Men's singles	Ali (PAK); L (9–21, 8–21)	Did not advance					
Prospera Nantuo	Women's singles	Bye	Kattirtzi (CYP); L (10–21, 8–21)	Did not advance				
Cindy Tornyenyor	Women's singles	Bye	Goh (MAS); L (3–21, 1–21)	Did not advance				

Doubles

Athlete	Event	Round of 64	Round of 32	Round of 16	Quarterfinal	Semifinal	Final / BM	
Athlete	Event	Opposition Score	Opposition Score	Opposition Score	Opposition Score	Opposition Score	Opposition Score	Rank
Kelvin Alphous; Ahmad Abdul-Samad	Men's doubles	—N/a	C Mulenga & K Mulenga (ZAM); L (8–21, 7–21)	Did not advance				
Prospera Nantuo; Cindy Tornyenyor	Women's doubles	—N/a	Chater & March (FLK); W (21–17, 22–20)	Richardson & Wynter (JAM); L (5–21, 6–21)	Did not advance			
Aaron Tamakloe; Cindy Tornyenyor	Mixed doubles	Bongout & Leung (MRI); L (5–21, 17–21)	Did not advance					
Kelvin Alphous; Prospera Nantuo	Mixed doubles	C Mulenga & Chipeleme (ZAM); W (21–19, 21–16)	Attama & Wanyana (UGA); L (17–21, 21–17, 14–21)	Did not advance				

== Beach volleyball ==
On 28 March 2022, Ghana qualified for the women's tournament. This was achieved by winning the African Qualifier in Accra.

Athletes	Event	Preliminary Round				Quarterfinals	Semifinals	Final / BM	Rank
Athletes	Event	Opposition Score	Opposition Score	Opposition Score	Rank	Opposition Score	Opposition Score	Opposition Score	Rank
Juliana Aryee; Rashaka Katadat	Women's	Melissa / Pavan (CAN); L 0 - 2	Zeimann / Polley (NZL); L 0 - 2	Khadambi / Makokha (KEN); L 1 - 2	4	did not advance			

=== Women's tournament ===
Group A

Pos	Team	Pld	W	L	Pts	SW	SL	SR	SPW	SPL	SPR	Qualification
1	Humana-Paredes – Pavan (CAN)	3	3	0	6	6	0	MAX	137	73	1.877	Quarterfinals
2	Zeimann – Polley (NZL)	3	2	1	5	4	2	2.000	124	105	1.181	Quarterfinals
3	Khadambi – Makokha (KEN)	3	1	2	4	2	5	0.400	101	134	0.754	Ranking of third-placed teams
4	Aryee – Katadat (GHA)	3	0	3	3	1	6	0.167	86	138	0.623	

Source: birmingham2022.com

Qualified for the Quarterfinals

30 July 2022; 14:30	Humana-Paredes – Pavan (CAN)	2–0	Aryee – Katadat (GHA)	Smithfield
30 July 2022; 14:30	(21–7, 21–6); Report			Smithfield

1 August 2022; 19:00	Zeimann – Polley (NZL)	2–0	Aryee – Katadat (GHA)	Smithfield
1 August 2022; 19:00	(21–10, 21–13); Report			Smithfield

3 August 2022; 14:30	Khadambi – Makokha (KEN)	2–1	Aryee – Katadat (GHA)	Smithfield
3 August 2022; 14:30	(16–21, 21–13, 15–12); Report			Smithfield

== Boxing ==
A squad of nine boxers was selected as of 21 June 2022.

Men

Athlete	Event	Round of 32	Round of 16	Quarterfinals	Semifinals	Final	
Athlete	Event	Opposition Result	Opposition Result	Opposition Result	Opposition Result	Opposition Result	Rank
Yaw Addo	Flyweight	—N/a	Paiva (NIR); L 2 - 3	did not advance			
Abraham Mensah	Bantamweight	—N/a	Bye	Prasanna (SRI); W 3 - 1	H-Allan (WAL); W 3 - 0	Eagleson (NIR); L 0 - 5	2nd place, silver medalist(s)
Joseph Commey	Featherweight	Aaree (KIR); W 5 - 0	Oaike (PNG); W RSC	Mukuka (NZL); W 5 - 0	Hussamuddin (IND); W 4 - 1	Gallagher (NIR); L WO	2nd place, silver medalist(s)
Abdul Omar	Light welterweight	Devine (IOM); W 4 - 1	Rokobuli (FIJ); W RSC	Ryan (ANT); W 4 - 1	Colin (MRI); L 0 - 5	Did not advance	3rd place, bronze medalist(s)
Alfred Kotey	Welterweight	Bye	Tokas (IND); L 0 - 5	did not advance			
Jessie Lartey	Light middleweight	Bye	Akbar (ENG); L 0 - 5	did not advance			
Abubakari Quartey	Middleweight	Bye	Benson (NGR); L 2 - 3	did not advance			
Shakul Samed	Light heavyweight	Rosalba (MRI); L WO	did not advance				

Women

Athlete	Event	Round of 16	Quarterfinals	Semifinals	Final	
Athlete	Event	Opposition Result	Opposition Result	Opposition Result	Opposition Result	Rank
Ornella Sathoud	Middleweight	Davis (ENG); L 0 - 4	did not advance			

== Cycling ==
=== Road ===
Men

Athlete	Event	Time	Rank
Abdul Rahman Abdul Samed	Road race	DNF	
Emmanuel Arthur	Road race	DNF	
Anthony Boakye Dankwa	Road race	DNF	
Henry Djangmah	Road race	DNF	
Henry Djangmah	Time trial	1:04:26.26	50
Christopher Symonds	Time trial	1:02:56.79	47

=== Track ===
Sprint

Athlete	Event	Qualification		Round 1	Quarterfinals	Semifinals	Final	
Athlete	Event	Time	Rank	Opposition Time	Opposition Time	Opposition Time	Opposition Time	Rank
Emmanuel Sackey	Men's sprint	12.729	26	did not advance				
Florence Heridor	Women's sprint	19.160	26	did not advance				
Erica Sedzro	Women's sprint	18.857	25	did not advance				
Frederick Assor; Mensah Rudolf (pilot)	Men's tandem sprint B	13.186	6	—N/a		did not advance		

Time trial

Athlete	Event	Time	Rank
Emmanuel Sackey	Men's time trial	1:20.526	20
Florence Heridor	Women's time trial	54.062	20
Erica Sedzeo	Women's time trial	49.452	19
Frederick Assor; Mensah Rudolf (pilot)	Men's tandem time trial B	1:25.240	7

== Hockey ==
By virtue of its position in the FIH World Rankings for men and women respectively (as of 1 February 2022), Ghana qualified for both tournaments.

Detailed fixtures were released on 9 March 2022.

Summary

Key:

- FT = After full time
- P = Match decided by penalty-shootout

Team	Event	Preliminary round					Semifinal	Final / BM / PM	
Team	Event	Opposition Result	Opposition Result	Opposition Result	Opposition Result	Rank	Opposition Result	Opposition Result	Rank
Ghana men	Men's tournament	England; L 0–6	India; L 0–11	Canada; D 1–1	Wales; L 1–6	5	Did not advance	Classification 9–10; Scotland; L 2–7	10
Ghana women	Women's tournament	India; L 0–5	England; L 0–12	Wales; L 0–4	Canada; L 2–8	5	Did not advance	Classification 9–10; Kenya; L 2–2 (PSO 2-3)	10

=== Men's tournament ===
Roster

- Alfred Ntiamoah
- Charles Abbiw
- Elikem Akaba
- Derick Owusu Lee
- Christopher Dogbe
- Eugene Acheampong
- Emmanuel Ankomah
- Mohammed Osumanu
- Matthew Damalie
- Samuel Afari
- Francis Tettey
- Michael Baiden
- Duisberg Offei
- Richard Adjei
- Kwofie Benjamin
- Luke Damalie
- Emmanuel Akaba
- Samuel Agbeli

Group play

Pos	Team	Pld	W	D	L	GF	GA	GD	Pts	Qualification
1	India	4	3	1	0	27	5	+22	10	Semi-finals
2	England (H)	4	3	1	0	25	8	+17	10	Semi-finals
3	Wales	4	2	0	2	14	10	+4	6	Fifth place match
4	Canada	4	0	1	3	4	25	−21	1	Seventh place match
5	Ghana	4	0	1	3	2	24	−22	1	Ninth place match

Source: Birmingham 2022
Rules for classification: 1) points; 2) number of wins; 3) goal difference; 4) goals scored; 5) head-to-head results.
(H) Hosts

29 July 2022
19:00

England	6–0	Ghana
Bandurak 8', 30', 45'; Roper 27'; Calnan 39'; Condon 51'	Report

Umpires:
Tim Bond (NZL)
Ilanggo Kanabathu (MAS)

31 July 2022
16:00

India	11–0	Ghana
Abhishek 2'; Harmanpreet 10', 36', 54'; Shamsher 14'; Akashdeep 20'; Jugraj 22', 45'; Nilakanta 39'; Varun 40'; Mandeep 48'	Report

Umpires:
Fraser Bell (SCO)
Tim Bond (NZL)

1 August 2022
19:00

Ghana	1–1	Canada
Kwofie 19'	Report	Pereira 60'

Umpires:
Deepak Joshi (IND)
Peter Kabaso (KEN)

3 August 2022
16:00

Wales	6–1	Ghana
Furlong 26', 38', 44'; Francis 48'; Kyriakides 58'; Dolan-Gray 58'	Report	Kwofie 21'

Umpires:
Tim Bond (NZL)
Nick Bennett (ENG)

Ninth place match

6 August 2022
09:00

Scotland	7–2	Ghana
Walker 7'; C. Golden 19'; J. Golden 36', 51'; Harwood 46'; Duke 47'; Morton 53'	Report	Ankomah 33'; Tettey 54'

Umpires:
Peter Kabaso (KEN)
Ilanggo Kanabathu (MAS)

=== Women's tournament ===
Roster

- Ernestina Coffie
- Dede Okine
- Vivian Narkuor
- Serwaa Baah
- Roberta Sarfo
- Racheal Bamfo
- Nafisatu Umaru
- Mavis Berko
- Martha Sarfoa
- Lydia Afriyie
- Hagiet Copson
- Elizabeth Opoku
- Cecilia Amoako
- Doris Antwi
- Bridget Azumah
- Adizatu Sulemana
- Abigail Boye
- Eleanor Otoo

Group play

Pos	Team	Pld	W	D	L	GF	GA	GD	Pts	Qualification
1	England (H)	4	4	0	0	21	1	+20	12	Semi-finals
2	India	4	3	0	1	12	6	+6	9	Semi-finals
3	Canada	4	2	0	2	14	5	+9	6	Fifth place match
4	Wales	4	1	0	3	5	12	−7	3	Seventh place match
5	Ghana	4	0	0	4	1	29	−28	0	Ninth place match

Source: Birmingham 2022
Rules for classification: 1) points; 2) number of wins; 3) goal difference; 4) goals scored; 5) head-to-head results.
(H) Hosts

29 July 2022
14:00

India	5–0	Ghana
Gurjit 3', 34'; Neha 28'; Sangita 36'; Salima 56'	Report

Umpires:
Wanri Venter (RSA)
Katrina Turner (NZL)

30 July 2022
16:00

England	12–0	Ghana
Balsdon 10', 19', 47'; Martin 15', 34', 48'; Ansley 27'; Hunt 28'; Howard 33'; Owsley 38'; Toman 48'; Unsworth 54'	Report

Umpires:
Wanri Venter (RSA)
Rhiannon Murrie (AUS)

1 August 2022
09:00

Wales	4–0	Ghana
Wilkinson 40'; Webb 50'; Holme 52'; Bingham 58'	Report

Umpires:
Binish Hayat (PAK)
Rebecca Woodcock (ENG)

2 August 2022
11:00

Ghana	1–8	Canada
Berko 51'	Report	Walton 7'; Delmotte 13', 47'; Thompson 14'; McManus 17', 17'; Stairs 49'; Secco 59'

Umpires:
Aleisha Neumann (AUS)
Rhiannon Murrie (AUS)

Ninth place match

5 August 2022
09:00

Ghana	2–2	Kenya
Umaru 26'; Berko 32'	Report	Bwire 5'; Mutiva 58'
Penalties
Umaru (penalty shoot-out scored); Opoku (penalty shoot-out missed); Berko (penalty shoot-out scored); Copson (penalty shoot-out missed); Narkuor (penalty shoot-out missed); Umaru (penalty shoot-out missed)	2–3	(penalty shoot-out missed) Okumu; (penalty shoot-out scored) Chebet; (penalty shoot-out missed) Okumu; (penalty shoot-out scored) Guchu; (penalty shoot-out missed) Owiti; (penalty shoot-out scored) Chebet

Umpires:
Rhiannon Murrie (AUS)
Rebecca Woodcock (ENG)

== Judo ==
Men

Athlete	Event	Round of 32	Round of 16	Quarterfinals	Semifinals	Repechage	Final/BM	
Athlete	Event	Opposition Result	Opposition Result	Opposition Result	Opposition Result	Opposition Result	Opposition Result	Rank
Zeo Agudoo	-60 kg	Rabbitt (WAL); L 00 - 10	did not advance					17
Sandor Iddris	-60 kg	Bangura (SLE); W 10 - 00	McKenzie (ENG); L 00 - 10	did not advance				9
Bismark Yartey	-66 kg	—N/a	Varey (WAL); L 00 - 10	did not advance				9
Rashid Alhassan	-81 kg	—N/a	G-Drapeau (CAN); L 00 - 10	did not advance				9
Victor Ahiavor	-100 kg	—N/a	L-Hewitt (ENG); L 00 - 10	did not advance				9

== Para powerlifting ==
Athlete	Event	Result	Rank
Emmanuel Oku	Men's lightweight	126.4	5
Vida Antwi	Women's heavyweight	74.4	7

== Squash ==
Athlete	Event	Round of 64	Round of 32	Round of 16	Quarterfinals	Semifinals	Final	
Athlete	Event	Opposition Score	Opposition Score	Opposition Score	Opposition Score	Opposition Score	Opposition Score	Rank
Clement Anafo	Men's singles	Jervis (CAY); L 0 - 3	did not advance					
Evans Ayih	Men's singles	Binnie (JAM); L 0 - 3	did not advance					
Clement Anafo; Evans Ayih	Men's doubles	—N/a	Aslam / Iqbal (PAK); L 0 - 2	did not advance				

== Swimming ==
Men

Athlete	Event	Heat		Semifinal		Final	
Athlete	Event	Time	Rank	Time	Rank	Time	Rank
Abeku Jackson	50 m freestyle	23.62	23	did not advance			
Kow Jackson	100 m freestyle	56.27	61	did not advance			
Kow Jackson	200 m freestyle	2:10.24	36	—N/a		did not advance	
Abeku Jackson	50 m butterfly	24.19	17	did not advance			
Abeku Jackson	100 m butterfly	53.60	12 Q	53.79	12	did not advance	

Women

Athlete	Event	Heat		Semifinal		Final	
Athlete	Event	Time	Rank	Time	Rank	Time	Rank
Unilez Takyi	50 m freestyle	28.12	44	did not advance			
Unilez Takyi	100 m freestyle	1:03.79	51	did not advance			
Zaira Forson	200 m freestyle	2:19.02	26	—N/a		did not advance	
Nubia Adjei	50 m backstroke	30.97	21	did not advance			
Nubia Adjei	100 m backstroke	1:09.12	23	did not advance			
Unilez Takyi	50 m breaststroke	37.68	29	did not advance			
Nubia Adjei	50 m butterfly	30.16	36	did not advance			
Zaira Forson	200 m butterfly	2:45.50	14	—N/a		did not advance	

== Table tennis ==
Singles

Athletes	Event	Group stage				Round of 32	Round of 16	Quarterfinal	Semifinal	Final / BM	
Athletes	Event	Opposition Score	Opposition Score	Opposition Score	Rank	Opposition Score	Opposition Score	Opposition Score	Opposition Score	Opposition Score	Rank
Derek Abrefa	Men's singles	Ahmed (MDV); W 4 - 0	Sabbir (BAN); W 4 - 0	—N/a	1 Q	Shetty (IND); L 0 - 4	did not advance				
Emanuel Asante	Men's singles	Choong (MAS); L 0 - 4	Chauhan (FIJ); W 4 - 0	—N/a	2	did not advance					
Emmanuel Commey	Men's singles	Daldleish (SCO); L 0 - 4	Nuopula (SOL); W 4 - 0	Wu (FIJ); W 4 - 0	2	did not advance					
Millicent Ankude	Women's singles	Kalam (RSA); L 1 - 4	Cummings (GUY); L 0 - 4	—N/a	3	did not advance					
Cynthia Kwabi	Women's singles	Plaistow (SCO); L 0 - 4	Lyne (MAS); L 0 - 4	—N/a	3	did not advance					

Doubles

Athletes	Event	Round of 64	Round of 32	Round of 16	Quarterfinal	Semifinal	Final / BM	
Athletes	Event	Opposition Score	Opposition Score	Opposition Score	Opposition Score	Opposition Score	Opposition Score	Rank
Emmanuel Commey; Derek Abrefa	Men's doubles	Bye	Lum / Liu (AUS); L 1 - 3	did not advance				
Emmanuel Asante; Emmanuel Ofori	Men's doubles	Bye	Chambers / Yan (AUS); L 0 - 3	did not advance				
Millicent Ankude; Cynthia Kwabi	Women's doubles	Ho / Lyne (MAS); L 0 - 3	did not advance					
Derek Abrefa; Cynthia Kwabi	Mixed doubles	Watson / Young (JAM); W 3 - 1	Aruna / Edem (NGR); W WO	Lum / Jee (AUS); L 0 - 3	did not advance			
Millicent Ankude; Emmanuel Commey	Mixed doubles	Pontoise / Desscann (MRI); W 3 - 2	Abiodun / Bello (NGR); L 0 - 3	did not advance				

Team

Athletes	Event	Group stage				Quarterfinal	Semifinal	Final / BM	
Athletes	Event	Opposition Score	Opposition Score	Opposition Score	Rank	Opposition Score	Opposition Score	Opposition Score	Rank
Derek Abrefa; Emmanuel Commey; Emmanuel Asante; Emmanuel Ofori	Men's team	Cyprus; L 1 - 3	Nigeria; L 0 - 3	South Africa; W 3 - 1	3	did not advance			

== Triathlon ==
Two triathletes have been selected to represent Ghana in Birmingham.

Individual

Athlete	Event	Swim (750 m)	Trans 1	Bike (20 km)	Trans 2	Run (5 km)	Total	Rank
Mark Ofosu	Men's	12:35	1:01	34:29	0:30	20:56	1:09:31	39
Mercy Pappoe	Women's	22:41	1:30	45:26	-	31:29	1:41:46	32

== Weightlifting ==
Two weightlifters qualified for the competition by virtue of their positions in the IWF Commonwealth Ranking List.

Athlete	Event	Weight lifted		Total	Rank
Athlete	Event	Snatch	Clean & jerk	Total	Rank
Forrester Osei	Men's 96 kg	NM	DNS	DNF	
Winnifred Ntumi	Women's 49 kg	63	76	139	9

== See also ==
- Ghana at the 2022 Winter Olympics
