= Mozambique at the 2022 Commonwealth Games =

- Flag of Mozambique
- CG code: MOZ
- CGA: National Olympic Committee of Mozambique
- Website: com-cga.co.mz (in Portuguese)

in Birmingham, England 28 July 2022 – 8 August 2022
- Competitors: 15 (9 men and 6 women) in 5 sports
- Flag bearers: Caio Lobo; Alcinda Panguana
- Medals Ranked 30th: Gold 0 Silver 2 Bronze 1 Total 3

Commonwealth Games appearances (overview)
- 1998; 2002; 2006; 2010; 2014; 2018; 2022; 2026; 2030

Mozambique competed at the 2022 Commonwealth Games at Birmingham, England from 28 July to 8 August 2022. It was Mozambique's seventh appearance at the Games.

Caio Lobo and Alcinda Panguana were the country's flagbearers during the opening ceremony.

== Medalists ==
Medal	Name	Sport	Event	Date
Silver	Tiago Muxanga	Boxing	Men's light middleweight	7 August
Silver	Rady Gramane	Boxing	Women's middleweight	7 August
Bronze	Alcinda Panguane	Boxing	Women's light middleweight	6 August

Medals by sport
Sport	Gold medal	Silver medal	Bronze medal	Total
Boxing	0	2	1	3
Total	0	2	1	3

Medals by date
Date	Gold medal	Silver medal	Bronze medal	Total
6 August	0	0	1	1
7 August	0	2	0	2
Total	0	2	1	3

Medals by gender
Gender	Gold medal	Silver medal	Bronze medal	Total
Male	0	1	0	1
Female	0	1	1	2
Mixed / open	0	0	0	0
Total	0	2	1	3

== Competitors ==
The following is the list of number of competitors participating at the Games per sport/discipline.

Sport	Men	Women	Total
Athletics	2	1	3
Boxing	2	3	5
Judo	2	1	3
Swimming	2	1	3
Triathlon	1	0	1
Total	9	6	15

== Athletics ==
Men
Track and road events

Athlete	Event	Heat		Semifinal		Final	
Athlete	Event	Result	Rank	Result	Rank	Result	Rank
Edio Mussacate	400 m	48.73	7	Did not advance			
Alex Macuacua	1500 m	3:57.48	10	—N/a		Did not advance	

Women
Track and road events

Athlete	Event	Heat		Semifinal		Final	
Athlete	Event	Result	Rank	Result	Rank	Result	Rank
Ancha Mandlate	100 m	12.14	6	Did not advance			
Ancha Mandlate	200 m	25.43	5	Did not advance			

== Boxing ==
Athlete	Event	Round of 32	Round of 16	Quarterfinals	Semifinals	Final	
Athlete	Event	Opposition Result	Opposition Result	Opposition Result	Opposition Result	Opposition Result	Rank
Armando Sigauque	Men's Bantamweight	—N/a	Bye	Eagleson (NIR); L 0 - 5	Did not advance		
Tiago Muxanga	Men's Light middleweight	Bye	Mengue (CMR); W 5 - 0	Stanley (NZL); W 3 - 0	Mbundwike (TAN); W 5 - 0	Walsh (NIR); L 0 - 5	2nd place, silver medalist(s)
Helena Bagão	Women's Light flyweight	—N/a	Zareen (IND); L RSC	Did not advance			
Alcinda Panguane	Women's Light middleweight	—N/a	Bye	Essiane (CMR); W 3 - 2	Scott (AUS); L 1 - 4	Did not advance	3rd place, bronze medalist(s)
Rady Gramane	Women's Middleweight	—N/a	Bye	Davis (ENG); W 5 - 0	Umunnakwe (NGR); W 5 - 0	Thibeault (CAN); L 0 - 5	2nd place, silver medalist(s)

== Judo ==
A squad of three judoka was entered as of 6 July 2022.

Athlete	Event	Round of 16	Quarterfinals	Semifinals	Repechage	Final/BM	
Athlete	Event	Opposition Result	Opposition Result	Opposition Result	Opposition Result	Opposition Result	Rank
Mauro Nassone	Men's -66 kg	Allan (SCO); L 00 - 10	Did not advance				9
Narciso Matos	Men's -73 kg	Pandabela (SOL); W 10 - 00	Powell (ENG); L 00 - 10	Did not advance	Majeed (MAS); L 00 - 10	Did not advance	7
Jacira Ferreira	Women's -52 kg	Bye	Baba Matia (CMR); L 00 - 01	Did not advance	Marsh (SCO); W 10 - 01	Javadian (NIR); L 00 - 01	5

== Swimming ==
Men

Athlete	Event	Heat		Semifinal		Final	
Athlete	Event	Time	Rank	Time	Rank	Time	Rank
Matthew Lawrence	50 m freestyle	24.23	35	Did not advance			
Matthew Lawrence	100 m freestyle	52.70	36	Did not advance			
Matthew Lawrence	50 m butterfly	25.00	23	Did not advance			
Matthew Lawrence	100 m butterfly	56.52	24	Did not advance			
Caio Lobo	50 m backstroke	28.65	36	Did not advance			
Caio Lobo	50 m breaststroke	30.53	31	Did not advance			
Caio Lobo	100 m breaststroke	1:05.92	29	Did not advance			
Caio Lobo	200 m breaststroke	2:28.22	16	—N/a		Did not advance	
Caio Lobo	200 m individual medley	2:13.46	21	—N/a		Did not advance	

Women

Athlete	Event	Heat		Semifinal		Final	
Athlete	Event	Time	Rank	Time	Rank	Time	Rank
Alicia Mateus	50 m freestyle	29.26	56	Did not advance			
Alicia Mateus	100 m freestyle	1:03.89	52	Did not advance			
Alicia Mateus	50 m butterfly	31.28	44	Did not advance			
Alicia Mateus	100 m butterfly	1:10.69	33	Did not advance			

== Triathlon ==
Individual

Athlete	Event	Swim (750 m)	Trans 1	Bike (20 km)	Trans 2	Run (5 km)	Total	Rank
Duncan Wyness	Men's	13:04	1:35	34:54	0:27	21:50	1:11:50	42
