= Mozambique at the 2026 Commonwealth Games =

- Flag of Mozambique
- CG code: MOZ
- CGA: National Olympic Committee of Mozambique
- Website: com-cga.co.mz

in Glasgow, Scotland 23 July 2026 – 2 August 2026
- Competitors: 6 in 3 sports
- Flag bearer: Matthew Lawrence
- Baton bearer: Cleyton Munguambe
- Medals: Gold 0 Silver 0 Bronze 0 Total 0

Commonwealth Games appearances (overview)
- 1998; 2002; 2006; 2010; 2014; 2018; 2022; 2026; 2030

Mozambique competed at the 2026 Commonwealth Games in Glasgow, Scotland. This marked Mozambique's eighth participation at the games, after making its debut at the 1998 Commonwealth Games.

The King's Baton relay stopped in Mozambique in September 2025.

The Mozambique team consisted of 12 athletes (six per gender) competing in four sports. On the eve of the games, the Mozambique boxing team was withdrawn due to not completing mandatory gender testing in time, reducing the team size to six athletes.

Swimmer Matthew Lawrence was the country's flagbearer during the opening ceremony. Meanwhile, fellow swimmer Cleyton Munguambe was the baton bearer during the opening ceremony.

The Mozambican team finished the games with no medals won.

== Competitors ==
The following is the list of number of competitors participating at the Games per sport/discipline.

Sport	Men	Women	Total
Athletics	1	1	2
Judo	1	1	2
Swimming	2	0	2
Total	4	2	6

== Athletics ==
Mozambique entered two track and field athletes (one per gender).

Track events

Athlete	Event	Round one		Final	
Athlete	Event	Result	Rank	Result	Rank
Edio Mussacate	Men's 400 m hurdles	53.59 SB	8	Did not advance	
Cecilia Francisco Guambe	Women's 100 m hurdles	13.65	6	Did not advance	

== Judo ==
Mozambique entered two judoka, one per gender.

Athlete	Event	Round of 32	Round of 16	Quarterfinals	Semifinals	Repechage	Final/BM	
Athlete	Event	Opposition Result	Opposition Result	Opposition Result	Opposition Result	Opposition Result	Opposition Result	Rank
Samuel Ribeiro	Men's 66 kg	Bye	Majgul (IND); L 000s1–100s1	Did not advance				
Cyntia Badru	Women's 52 kg	—N/a	Matia (CMR); L 000s2–100s1	Did not advance				

== Swimming ==
Mozambique entered two male swimmers into the competition.

Men

Athlete	Event	Heat		Semifinal		Final	
Athlete	Event	Time	Rank	Time	Rank	Time	Rank
Matthew Lawrence	50 m breaststroke	28.86	27	Did not advance			
Matthew Lawrence	100 m breaststroke	1:06.38	31	Did not advance			
Matthew Lawrence	50 m butterfly	25.08	33	Did not advance			
Cleyton Munguambe	50 m freestyle	24.07	37	Did not advance			
Cleyton Munguambe	100 m freestyle	51.95	34	Did not advance			
Cleyton Munguambe	50 m butterfly	26.11	47	Did not advance			
