= Mozambique at the 2014 Commonwealth Games =

- CG code: MOZ
- CGA: National Olympic Committee of Mozambique

in Glasgow, Scotland
- Competitors: 17 in 4 sports
- Flag bearer: Kurt Couto
- Medals Ranked =27th: Gold 0 Silver 1 Bronze 1 Total 2

Commonwealth Games appearances (overview)
- 1998; 2002; 2006; 2010; 2014; 2018; 2022; 2026; 2030

Mozambique competed in the 2014 Commonwealth Games in Glasgow, Scotland from July 23 to August 3, 2014.

== Medalists ==
Medal	Name	Sport	Event	Date
Silver	Maria Muchavo	Athletics	Women's 100 m (T12)	July 28
Bronze	Maria Machongua	Boxing	Women's Lightweight	August 2

== Athletics ==
Key

- Note–Ranks given for track events are within the athlete's heat only
- Q = Qualified for the next round
- q = Qualified for the next round as a fastest loser or, in field events, by position without achieving the qualifying target
- NR = National record
- N/A = Round not applicable for the event

Men
Track & road events

Athlete	Event	Heat		Semifinal		Final	
Athlete	Event	Result	Rank	Result	Rank	Result	Rank
Alberto Mamba	800 m	1:47.57	7 Q	1:47.73	8	Did not advance	
Alberto Mamba	1500 m	DNS		—N/a		Did not advance	
Kurt Couto	400 m hurdles	DSQ		—N/a		Did not advance	

Women
Track & road events

Athlete	Event	Heat		Final	
Athlete	Event	Result	Rank	Result	Rank
Maria Muchavo	100 m (T12)	13.40	2 Q	13.33	2nd place, silver medalist(s)
Silvia Panguana	100 m hurdles	14.98	20	Did not advance	

== Boxing ==
Men

Athlete	Event	Round of 32	Round of 16	Quarterfinals	Semifinals	Final	
Athlete	Event	Opposition Result	Opposition Result	Opposition Result	Opposition Result	Opposition Result	Rank
Juliano Máquina	Light flyweight	Bye	A Williams (WAL); L 0 - 3	Did not advance			
Bernado Marrime	Light welterweight	Lumbwe (ZAM); L 1 - 2	Did not advance				
Augusto Mathule	Welterweight	Jangra (IND); L 0 - 3	Did not advance				

Women

Athlete	Event	Round of 16	Quarterfinals	Semifinals	Final	Rank
Athlete	Event	Opposition Result	Opposition Result	Opposition Result	Opposition Result	Rank
Maria Machongua	Lightweight	Mathaha (LES); W 3 - 0	Rakhudu (BOT); W 2 - 1	Devi (IND); L 0 - 3	Did not advance	3rd place, bronze medalist(s)

== Judo ==
Men

Athlete	Event	Round of 32	Round of 16	Quarterfinal	Semifinal	Repechage	Final / BM	Rank
Athlete	Event	Opposition Result	Opposition Result	Opposition Result	Opposition Result	Opposition Result	Opposition Result	Rank
Neusa Sigaugue	−60 kg	—N/a	W Kalunga (ZAM); W 1002-0000	D Agudoo (GHA); W 1000-0002	A McKenzie (ENG); L 0000-1002	Bye	R Abugiri (GHA); L 0000-1101	5
Bruno Luzia	−66 kg	E Ndawu (MAW); W 1100-0000	R Ovinou (PNG); W w/o	S Mabulu (RSA); L 0000-1102	Did not advance	M Punza (ZAM); L 0010-1000	Did not advance	7
Edson Madeira	−73 kg	B Singh (IND); W 1010-0012	E Nartey (GHA); L 0002-0003	Did not advance				

== Swimming ==
Men

Athlete	Event	Heat		Semifinal		Final	
Athlete	Event	Time	Rank	Time	Rank	Time	Rank
Emidio Cuna	50 m freestyle	DNS		Did not advance			
Shakil Fakir	50 m freestyle	25.11	40	Did not advance			
Igor Mogne	50 m freestyle	24.87	37	Did not advance			
Emidio Cuna	100 m freestyle	DNS		Did not advance			
Shakil Fakir	100 m freestyle	55.08	=38	Did not advance			
Igor Mogne	100 m freestyle	54.10	36	Did not advance			
Igor Mogne	200 m freestyle	1:59.85	28	—N/a		Did not advance	
Igor Mogne	50 m backstroke	28.19	23	Did not advance			
Igor Mogne	100 m backstroke	1:00.74	25	Did not advance			
Shakil Fakir	50 m breaststroke	DNS		Did not advance			
Emidio Cuna	50 m butterfly	27.44	36	Did not advance			
Emidio Cuna	100 m butterfly	DNS		Did not advance			
Igor Mogne	100 m butterfly	58.56	24	Did not advance			
Igor Mogne	200 m individual medley	2:18.89	22	—N/a		Did not advance	

Women

Athlete	Event	Heat		Semifinal		Final	
Athlete	Event	Time	Rank	Time	Rank	Time	Rank
Jannah Sonnenschein	50 m butterfly	29.13	26	Did not advance			
Jannah Sonnenschein	100 m butterfly	1:03.98	19	Did not advance			
Jannah Sonnenschein	200 m butterfly	2:24.33	22	—N/a		Did not advance	
