= Mozambique at the 2006 Commonwealth Games =

Sporting event delegation

Mozambique at the Commonwealth Games
- CG code: MOZ
- CGA: National Olympic Committee of Mozambique
- Website: com-cga.co.mz (in Portuguese)
- Medals Ranked 38th: Gold 0 Silver 0 Bronze 1 Total 1

Commonwealth Games appearances (overview)
- 1998; 2002; 2006; 2010; 2014; 2018; 2022; 2026; 2030

Mozambique was represented at the 2006 Commonwealth Games in Melbourne from 15 to 26 March.

== Medals ==
	(gold)	(silver)	(bronze)	Total
Mozambique	0	0	1	1

=== Bronze ===
- Maria de Lurdes Mutola, Athletics, Women's 800m
