= Mozambique at the 2018 Commonwealth Games =

- Flag of Mozambique
- CG code: MOZ
- CGA: National Olympic Committee of Mozambique

in Gold Coast, Australia 4 April 2018 – 15 April 2018
- Competitors: 26 in 6 sports
- Medals: Gold 0 Silver 0 Bronze 0 Total 0

Commonwealth Games appearances (overview)
- 1998; 2002; 2006; 2010; 2014; 2018; 2022; 2026; 2030

Mozambique competed at the 2018 Commonwealth Games in the Gold Coast, Australia from 4 to 15 April 2018.

== Competitors ==
The following is the list of number of competitors participating at the Games per sport/discipline.

Sport	Men	Women	Total
Athletics	4	1	5
Basketball	0	12	12
Beach volleyball	2	0	2
Boxing	0	1	1
Cycling	1	0	1
Swimming	5	0	5
Total	12	14	26

== Athletics ==
Men
Track & road events

Athlete	Event	Heat		Final	
Athlete	Event	Result	Rank	Result	Rank
Jenito Guezane	800 m	DSQ		did not advance	
Alberto Mamba	800 m	1:48.19	5	did not advance	
Kurt Couto	400 m hurdles	49.56	3	did not advance	
Creve Armando Machava	400 m hurdles	51.60	6	did not advance	
Kurt Couto; Jenito Guezane; Creve Armando Machava; Alberto Mamba	4 × 400 m relay	DNS		did not advance	

Women
Field events

Athlete	Event	Qualification		Final	
Athlete	Event	Distance	Rank	Distance	Rank
Salomé Mugabe	Shot put	15.63	10 q	14.98	11
Salomé Mugabe	Discus throw	—N/a		45.72	11

== Basketball ==
Mozambique qualified a women's basketball teams of 12 athletes. The team qualified after being ranked in the top three in the Commonwealth (besides the host nation, Australia).

=== Women's tournament ===
Roster

The following is the Mozambique roster in the women's basketball tournament of the 2018 Commonwealth Games.

Mozambique women's national basketball team - 2018 Commonwealth Games roster
Players
Coaches

Pos.	No.	Name	Age – Date of birth	Height	Club	Ctr.
G	4	Iliana Ventura	28 – 14 February 1990	1.68 m (5 ft 6 in)	A'Politechnica	(Mozambique)
F	5	Ingvild Mucauro	25 – 12 September 1992	1.78 m (5 ft 10 in)	Ferroviário	(Mozambique)
G	6	Dulce Mabjaia	29 – 5 November 1988	1.65 m (5 ft 5 in)	Ferroviário	(Mozambique)
G	7	Anabela Cossa	31 – 7 April 1986	1.72 m (5 ft 8 in)	Ferroviário	(Mozambique)
F	8	Eliotéria Lhavanguane	20 – 12 November 1997	1.81 m (5 ft 11 in)	Ferroviário	(Mozambique)
G	9	Ana Jaime	27 – 6 December 1990	1.69 m (5 ft 7 in)	Ferroviário	(Mozambique)
G	10	Delma Zita	20 – 27 March 1998	1.63 m (5 ft 4 in)	Ferroviário	(Mozambique)
G	11	Aquila Mucubarique	22 – 20 November 1995	1.71 m (5 ft 7 in)
G	12	Elizabeth Pereira	26 – 8 November 1991	1.70 m (5 ft 7 in)	Ferroviário	(Mozambique)
G	13	Onélia Mutombene	27 – 24 October 1990	1.66 m (5 ft 5 in)	Campus Promete	(Spain)
F	14	Odélia Mafanela	28 – 14 April 1989	1.84 m (6 ft 0 in)	Ferroviário	(Mozambique)
F/C	15	Deolinda Gimo	30 – 15 August 1987	1.90 m (6 ft 3 in)	Ferroviário	(Mozambique)

Head coach

- (Mozambique) Deolinda Ngulela

Assistant coach(es)

- (Mozambique) Leonel Manhique

Legend

- (C) Team captain
- Club - describes last
  club before the tournament
- Age - describes age
  on 5 April 2018

Pool A

Pos	Team	Pld	W	L	PF	PA	PD	Pts	Qualification
1	Australia (H)	3	3	0	331	169	+162	6	Semi-finals
2	Canada	3	2	1	226	207	+19	5	Semi-finals
3	England	3	1	2	187	249	−62	4	Qualifying finals
4	Mozambique	3	0	3	157	276	−119	3	Qualifying finals

Source: GC2018
Rules for classification: 1) Points; 2) Head-to-head results; 3) Points difference; 4) Points scored.
(H) Hosts

6 April 2018
21:00

Boxscore

Australia	113–53	Mozambique
Scoring by quarter: 25–9, 25–11, 36–14, 27–19
Pts: Cambage 24; Rebs: George 11; Asts: George, Griffin 5		Pts: Gimo 18; Rebs: Mucauro 9 Asts: Zita 3

Townsville Entertainment and Convention Centre, Townsville
Referees: Joyce Muchenu (ZIM), Ho Shuet Mei (SGP), Matthew Bathurst (NZL)

8 April 2018
11:30

Boxscore

Mozambique	51–78	England
Scoring by quarter: 14–19, 13–17, 20–22, 4–20
Pts: Mafanela 13; Rebs: Mafanela 7 Asts: Cossa 6		Pts: Stewart 18; Rebs: Stewart 12; Asts: Jones 5

Townsville Entertainment and Convention Centre, Townsville
Referees: Jon Chapman (AUS), Joyce Muchenu (ZIM), Ho Shuet Mei (SGP)

9 April 2018
20:00

Boxscore

Canada	85–53	Mozambique
Scoring by quarter: 28–11, 15–17, 28–13, 14–12
Pts: Hamblin, Provo 13; Rebs: Hamblin 10; Asts: Nofuente 6		Pts: Gimo 13; Rebs: Lhavanguane 9 Asts: Mucauro 4

Townsville Entertainment and Convention Centre, Townsville
Referees: Matthew Beattie (AUS), Matthew Bathurst (NZL), Snehal Bendke (IND)

Qualifying finals

10 April 2018
21:00

Boxscore

Mozambique	63–79	New Zealand
Scoring by quarter: 7–18, 19–23, 15–19, 22–19
Pts: Mafanela 15; Rebs: Lhavanguane, Mucauro 7 Asts: Cossa, Mucauro 5		Pts: Taylor 25; Rebs: Taylor 8 Asts: Hunter 7

Townsville Entertainment and Convention Centre, Townsville
Referees: Takaki Kato (JPN), Jon Chapman (AUS), Joyce Muchenu (ZIM)

Finished in sixth place overall

== Beach volleyball ==
Mozambique received a wild card for a men's beach volleyball team of two athletes.

Athlete	Event	Preliminary round	Standing	Quarterfinals	Semifinals	Final / BM	
Athlete	Event	Opposition Score	Standing	Opposition Score	Opposition Score	Opposition Score	Rank
Carlos Acácio; Delcio Soares	Men's	Pool C Gregory – Sheaf (ENG); L 0–2 (13–21, 14–21); O'Dea – O'Dea (NZL); L 1–2 (21–19, 9–21, 11–15); Apostolou – Chrysostomou (CYP); L 0–2 (18–21, 17–21)	4	did not advance			

== Boxing ==
Mozambique participated with a team of 2 athletes (1 man and 1 woman). Carlos Mucamba who was originally on the team was not a part of the draw, and thus did not compete.

Athlete	Event	Round of 16	Quarterfinals	Semifinals	Final	Rank
Athlete	Event	Opposition Result	Opposition Result	Opposition Result	Opposition Result	Rank
Rady Gramane	Women's −75 kg	Bye	Price (WAL); L 0–5	did not advance		

== Cycling ==
Mozambique participated with 1 athlete (1 man).

=== Road ===
Men

Athlete	Event	Time	Rank
Miguel Duarte	Road race	DNF	

== Swimming ==
Mozambique participated with 5 athletes (5 men).

Men

Athlete	Event	Heat		Semifinal		Final	
Athlete	Event	Time	Rank	Time	Rank	Time	Rank
Denilson Da Costa	50 m freestyle	24.12	32	did not advance			
Igor Mogne	50 m freestyle	23.58	26	did not advance			
Denilson Da Costa	100 m freestyle	53.30	37	did not advance			
Igor Mogne	100 m freestyle	50.74	24	did not advance			
Érico Cuna	200 m freestyle	1:59.43	26	—N/a		did not advance	
Érico Cuna	50 m backstroke	28.03	13 Q	28.10	13	did not advance	
Érico Cuna	100 m backstroke	1:01.27	20	did not advance			
Ahllan Bique	50 m breaststroke	30.52	25	did not advance			
Ludovico Coursin	50 m breaststroke	28.56	13 Q	28.53	13	did not advance	
Ahllan Bique	100 m breaststroke	1:07.29	19	did not advance			
Ludovico Coursin	100 m breaststroke	1:05.83	16 Q	1:05.07	15	did not advance	
Ahllan Bique	200 m breaststroke			—N/a			
Érico Cuna	50 m butterfly	26.11	34	did not advance			
Igor Mogne	50 m butterfly	25.23	24	did not advance			
Igor Mogne	100 m butterfly	55.20	17	did not advance			
Érico Cuna; Ludovico Coursin; Igor Mogne; Denilson Da Costa	4 × 100 m medley relay	3:55.91	7 Q	—N/a		3:52.41	7

== See also ==
- Mozambique at the 2018 Summer Youth Olympics
