= Mozambique at the Commonwealth Games =

- CGF code: MOZ
- CGA: National Olympic Committee of Mozambique
- Website: com-cga.co.mz (in Portuguese)
- Medals Ranked 38th: Gold 2 Silver 4 Bronze 3 Total 9

Commonwealth Games appearances (overview)
- 1998; 2002; 2006; 2010; 2014; 2018; 2022; 2026; 2030

Mozambique have participated in six Commonwealth Games since joining the Commonwealth in 1995.

== Medals ==
Games	Gold	Silver	Bronze	Total
(Malaysia) 1998 Kuala Lumpur	1	1	0	2
(England) 2002 Manchester	1	0	0	1
(Australia) 2006 Melbourne	0	0	1	1
(India) 2010 Delhi	0	0	0	0
(Scotland) 2014 Glasgow	0	1	1	2
(Australia) 2018 Gold Coast	0	0	0	0
(England) 2022 Birmingham	0	2	1	3
Totals (7 entries)	2	4	3	9

== See also ==
- All-time medal tally of Commonwealth Games
- Mozambique
- Commonwealth Games Federation
