= Taylor Bevan =

Welsh boxer (born 2001)

Personal information
- Born: 17 January 2001 (age 25) Southampton, Hampshire, England
- Height: 5 ft 11 in (180 cm)
- Weight: Super-middleweight, Light-heavyweight

Boxing career

Boxing record
- Total fights: 10
- Wins: 10
- Win by KO: 9
Medal record
Men's amateur boxing
Representing Wales
Commonwealth Games
Silver medal – second place	2022 Birmingham	Light heavyweight

Taylor Bevan (born 17 January 2001) is an English-born Welsh professional boxer. As an amateur. he won the silver medal in the men's light heavyweight category at the 2022 Commonwealth Games.

== Career ==
Bevan won a silver medal in the men's light heavyweight category at the 2022 Commonwealth Games, losing to Sean Lazzerini from Scotland by split decision in the final.

Having failed to qualify for the 2024 Summer Olympics, he announced he had quit the GB Boxing set-up after two-and-a-half years on 2 August 2024.

In November 2024, Bevan signed a long-term promotional deal with Eddie Hearn’s Matchroom Boxing.

He made his professional debut on the undercard of Sunny Edwards vs Galal Yafai, at bp pulse LIVE Arena in Birmingham on 30 November 2024, stopping Greg O'Neill in the second round.

Bevan recorded an identical result in his next fight, stopping Szymon Kajda in the second round at The O2 Arena in London on 31 January 2025.

In his third pro-fight he had an even shorter night's work, stopping Aleš Makovec in the first round at Altrincham Ice Dome on 28 March 2025.

At the Copper Box Arena in London on 17 May 2025, Bevan made it four stoppages from four bouts when he defeated Juan Cruz Cacheiro via technical knockout in the second round.

He beat Zdenko Bule by third round stoppage at Bournemouth International Centre on 26 July 2025.

On 17 October 2025, Bevan defeated Lukas Ferneza via technical knockout in the fifth round at York Hall in London.

He then registered a seventh win inside the distance when Mickey Ellison's corner threw in the towel during the sixth of their scheduled eight-round contest at Indigo at The O2 in London on 17 December 2025.

Bevan maintained his perfect record of stoppages in his next fight when he knocked out Martin Ezequiel Bulacio with a punch to the body in the second round at the Copper Box Arena in London on 21 March 2026.

He faced Ryszard Lewicki in his first 10-round bout at St Mary's Stadium in Southampton on 20 June 2026. Bevan was taken the distance for the first time in his career, winning by majority decision with two of the ringside judges scoring the fight 97–94 in his favour, while the third had it a 95–95 draw.

Bevan fought previously unbeaten Irish boxer, Emmet Brennan, over 10 rounds at Croke Park in Dublin, Ireland, on 5 September 2026. He knocked his opponent to the canvas five times throughout the bout, eventually winning by technical knockout in the sixth round.

== Personal life ==
His father Lester Bevan is a boxing coach. Bevan qualifies for Welsh nationality through his mother. He is the brother of professional footballer Owen Bevan.

== Professional boxing record ==
10 fights	10 wins	0 losses
By knockout	9	0
By decision	1	0

No.	Result	Record	Opponent	Type	Round, time	Date	Location	Notes
10	Win	10–0	Emmet Brennan	TKO	6 (10), 0:36	5 Sep 2026	Croke Park, Dublin, Ireland	
9	Win	9–0	Ryszard Lewicki	MD	10	20 Jun 2026	St Mary's Stadium, Southampton, England	
8	Win	8–0	Martin Ezequiel Bulacio	KO	2 (8), 2:16	21 Mar 2026	Copper Box Arena, London, England	
7	Win	7–0	Mickey Ellison	TKO	6 (8), 1:01	17 Dec 2025	Indigo at The O2, London, England	
6	Win	6–0	Lukas Ferneza	TKO	5 (8), 1:17	17 Oct 2025	York Hall, Bethnal Green, England	
5	Win	5–0	Zdenko Bule	TKO	3 (6), 0:43	26 Jul 2025	Bournemouth International Centre, Bournemouth, England	
4	Win	4–0	Juan Cruz Cacheiro	TKO	2 (6), 1:33	17 May 2025	Copper Box Arena, London, England	
3	Win	3–0	Ales Makovec	TKO	1 (6), 2:15	28 Mar 2025	Altrincham Ice Dome, Altrincham, England	
2	Win	2–0	Szymon Kajda	TKO	2 (6), 1:31	31 Jan 2025	The O2 Arena, London, England	
1	Win	1–0	Greg O'Neill	TKO	2 (6), 2:40	30 Nov 2024	bp pulse LIVE Arena, Birmingham, England	
