= Billy Le Poullain =

Guernsey boxer (born 1995)

Personal information
- Nationality: Guernsey
- Born: William Le Poullain; 4 May 1995 (age 31) Birmingham, England
- Height: 176 cm (5 ft 9 in)

Sport
- Sport: Boxing
- Weight class: Welterweight, Middleweight
- Club: Guernsey Amalgamated Boxing Club

Billy Le Poullain (born 4 May 1995) is an amateur boxer who represents Guernsey. Born in Birmingham, England, he was raised in Alderney. Le Poullain was the first boxer to represent Guernsey at the Commonwealth Games when he did so at the 2018 Gold Coast Games although he lost to Gul Zaib of Pakistan in the welterweight round of 32. Four years later at the 2022 Birmingham Games he received a bye and then became the first boxer from Guernsey to win a fight at a Commonwealth Games when he beat Jake Tucker of Northern Ireland in the middleweight round of 16. He lost in the quarterfinals to Lewis Richardson of England.
