= Sachin Siwach =

Indian boxer (born 2002)

Personal information
- Born: 25 November 2002 (age 23) Bhiwani, Haryana, India
- Height: 1.67 m (5 ft 6 in) (2022)
- Relative: Vijender Singh (uncle)

Sport
- Sport: Boxing
- Weight class: 60 kg (130 lb)
Medal record
Men's amateur boxing
Representing India
World Boxing Cup
Gold medal – first place	2025 New Delhi	60 kg
Bronze medal – third place	2025 Foz do Iguaçu	60 kg
Commonwealth Games
Gold medal – first place	2026 Glasgow	60 kg
Asian Elite Championships
Silver medal – second place	2026 Ulaanbaatar	60 kg
Youth and Junior World Championships
Gold medal – first place	2021 Kielce	Bantamweight (56 kg)

Sachin Siwach (born 25 November 2002) is an Indian amateur boxer who competes in the bantamweight division. He won the gold medal in the 60 kg category at the 2026 Commonwealth Games at Glasgow and the 2025 World Boxing Cup finals at New Delhi. He had also won the gold medal in the bantamweight category at the 2021 AIBA Youth World Boxing Championships at Kielce.

== Life and career ==
Sachin Siwach was born on 25 November 2002, and hails from Bhiwani district in Haryana. He trains in boxing at the Sports Authority of India centre at Rohtak.

Siwach started competing in the global circuit in 2021. In his first international competition, the 2021 AIBA Youth World Boxing Championships at Kielce, he competed in the men's bantamweight category. He defeated Kazakhstan's Yerbolat Sabyr in the finals to win the gold medal. In the 2022 Asian Games at Hangzhou, he represented India in the men's 57 kg category. After winning his first two bouts, he lost to Lu Ping of China in the quarter-finals.

In the 2025 World Boxing Cup, Siwach won the bronze medal in the 60 kg category in the first stage in Foz do Iguaçu, and the gold medal in the finals in New Delhi. At the Asian Elite Boxing Championships in Ulaanbaatar held in April 2026, Siwach won the silver medal in the 60 kg category after losing to Kazakhstan's Orazbek Assylkulov in the final.

Siwach represented India in the men's 60 kg event at the 2026 Commonwealth Games in Glasgow. He defeated Canada's Keoma Al-Ahmadieh England's William Hewitt in the first two rounds to advance to the quarter-finals. In the quarter-finals, he defeated Treasure Moremi of Botswana in a unanimous decision to reach the semi-finals. In the semi-finals, he defeated Owain Harris-Allan of Wales to progress to the finals. In the finals, he defeated Tryagain Ndevelo of Northern Namibia by a narrow 3-2 margin, to win the gold medal.
