= Hamraoui =

Hamraoui is a Maghrebian surname. Notable people with the surname include:

- Kheira Hamraoui (born 1990), French footballer
- Lounès Hamraoui, French boxer

== See also ==
- Hamraoui case
