= Boxing at the 2015 Commonwealth Youth Games =

Boxing at the V Commonwealth Youth Games
- Host city: Apia
- Dates: September
- Main venue: Tuana’imato Sports Facility, Apia

Boxing was competed as one of the nine sports at the 2015 Commonwealth Youth Games in the Apia from September 5 to 11, 2015, in the Tuana’imato Sports Facility, Apia. The event is only open to boys. In the Games, the age limit for participating athletes has been set according to the youth category of the International Boxing Association, which is 17–18 years, means athletes born in 1997 or 1998 are only eligible to take part.

== Medal summary ==
Event	Gold	Silver	Bronze
Light flyweight	Stephen McKenna; Ireland (IRL)	Tyler Blizzard; Australia (AUS)	Leichombam Bhimchand Singh; India (IND)
Light flyweight	Stephen McKenna; Ireland (IRL)	Tyler Blizzard; Australia (AUS)	Rajab Otukile Mahommed; Botswana (BOT)
Flyweight	Jack Bowen; Australia (AUS)	Gaurav Solanki; India (IND)	Ioane Ioane; Samoa (SAM)
Flyweight	Jack Bowen; Australia (AUS)	Gaurav Solanki; India (IND)	Brandon Daord; England (ENG)
Bantamweight	James McGivern; Northern Ireland (NIR)	William Stuart; Scotland (SCO)	George Payne; Australia (AUS)
Bantamweight	James McGivern; Northern Ireland (NIR)	William Stuart; Scotland (SCO)	Emmanuel Ngoma; Zambia (ZAM)
Lightweight	Thadius Katua; Papua New Guinea (PNG)	Tieman Bradley; Northern Ireland (NIR)	Iosefo Folesi; Samoa (SAM)
Lightweight	Thadius Katua; Papua New Guinea (PNG)	Tieman Bradley; Northern Ireland (NIR)	Dalton Smith; England (ENG)
Light welterweight	Aidan Walsh; Northern Ireland (NIR)	Mathew Rennie; Isle of Man (IOM)	Prayag Chauhan; India (IND)
Light welterweight	Aidan Walsh; Northern Ireland (NIR)	Mathew Rennie; Isle of Man (IOM)	Kieran McMaster; Scotland (SCO)
Welterweight	Harris Akbar; England (ENG)	Brett McGinty; Northern Ireland (NIR)	Daniel Bonne; Seychelles (SEY)
Welterweight	Harris Akbar; England (ENG)	Brett McGinty; Northern Ireland (NIR)	Jack Gipp; Australia (AUS)
Middleweight	John Docherty; Scotland (SCO)	Benjamin Whittaker; England (ENG)	Christopher Alberte; Mauritius (MRI)
Middleweight	John Docherty; Scotland (SCO)	Benjamin Whittaker; England (ENG)	Antreas Kokkinos; Cyprus (CYP)
Light heavyweight	Sean Lazzerini; Scotland (SCO)	Kanongata'a Antonio; Tonga (TGA)	John Peneueta; Samoa (SAM)
