= Tuvalu at the Commonwealth Games =

- CG code: TUV
- CGA: Tuvalu Association of Sports and National Olympic Committee
- Website: oceaniasport.com/tuvalu
- Medals: Gold 0 Silver 0 Bronze 1 Total 1

Commonwealth Games appearances (overview)
- 1998; 2002; 2006; 2010; 2014; 2018; 2022; 2026; 2030

Tuvalu first participated in the Commonwealth Games in 1998, when a weightlifter attended the games held at Kuala Lumpur, Malaysia. Tuvalu has subsequently sent teams to compete in the Commonwealth Games.

== Medal tally ==
	(gold)	(silver)	(bronze)	Total
Tuvalu	0	0	1	1

Tuvalu is low-ranked on the all-time medal tally of the Commonwealth Games. Boxer Tarona Taafaki won Tuvalu's first ever Commonwealth Games medal, a bronze in the women's 75 kg event in 2026.

== History ==
Tuvalu first participated in the Commonwealth Games in 1998, when a weightlifter attended the games held at Kuala Lumpur, Malaysia.

At the 2002 Commonwealth Games in Manchester, England, Tuvalu was represented by two table tennis players - Alan Puga Resture and Teokila Maleko.

At the 2006 Commonwealth Games in Melbourne, Australia, Tuvalu were represented by Alan Puga Resture & Napetari Tioti, participating in table tennis events, and Geoffrey Ludbrook (50m Rifle Prone) and Logona Esau (men's 69 kg combined weightlifting).

At the 2010 Commonwealth Games in Delhi, India, Tuvaluan athletes participated in the discus, shot put and weightlifting events. Tuau Lapua Lapua finished in 15th position in the men's final for weightlifting (62 kg), with a lift of 220 kg. Fakepelu Sileti entered the discus throw and the shot put events and reached 14th position in the qualifying rounds of the men's shot put, with a distance of 12.62 metres.

Tuvalu sent a team of five to the 2014 Commonwealth Games in Glasgow, Scotland comprising Logona Esau, Tuau Lapua Lapua and Kaie Luenita in weightlifting; and Kaimalie Resture and Alan Resture in table tennis.

Tuvalu sent a team of four to the Gold Coast XXI Commonwealth Games in 2018, comprising Karalo Maibuca (men's 100 metres), Imo Fiamalua (men's javelin throw), Kalton Melton and Tulimanu Vaea (men's table tennis doubles).

Tuvalu sent a team of five to the Birmingham XXII Commonwealth Games in 2022, comprising Karalo Maibuca (men's 100 metres), Ampex Isaac and Saaga Malosa (men's beach volleyball), Leatialii Afoa (lightweight boxing) and Fiu Tui (middleweight boxing).

Tuvalu's team at the Glasgow XXIII Commonwealth Games in 2026, consisted of eight athletes (five men and three women) competing in three sports. Boxer Tarona Taafaki won Tuvalu's first ever Commonwealth Games medal, a bronze in the women's 75 kg event.
