= Abdul-Afeez Osoba =

Nigerian boxer (born 1995)

Personal information
- Nationality: Nigerian
- Born: Abdul-Afeez Ayoola Osoba; 31 October 1995 (age 30) Lagos, Nigeria
- Height: 175 cm (5 ft 9 in)

Boxing career
Medal record
Men's amateur boxing
Representing Nigeria
African Games
Silver medal – second place	2019 Morocco	Welterweight (69 kg)

Abdul-Afeez Ayoola Osoba (born 31 October 1995) is a Nigerian amateur boxer.

He competed for Nigeria at local and international boxing competitions.

== Achievements ==
Osoba's five times National Champion in Nigeria. Two times National Sports Festival Gold Medalist. Bronze Medalist at African Zone 3 Boxing Championship in Cameroon. He participated in the 2022 Commonwealth Games in boxing.

He defeated Carl Leviticus of Bahamas.

in the men's light-middleweight round of 32 match with a technical knockout.

He loss in the round of 16 by Unanimous decision to Garan Croft from Wales.

He was defeated by Mauritius Merven Clair in the men's 69 kg Welterweight final by split decision to emerge as a silver medalist for Nigeria at the 12th African Games in Morocco.

He signed a contract with Streetwise Management, a boxing management company in the United Kingdom.
