= Tuvalu at the 2022 Commonwealth Games =

- Flag of Tuvalu
- CGF code: TUV
- CGA: Tuvalu Association of Sports and National Olympic Committee
- Website: facebook.com/TASNOC (Facebook)

in Birmingham, England 28 July 2022 – 8 August 2022
- Competitors: 5 (5 men and 0 women) in 3 sports
- Medals: Gold 0 Silver 0 Bronze 0 Total 0

Commonwealth Games appearances (overview)
- 1998; 2002; 2006; 2010; 2014; 2018; 2022; 2026; 2030

Tuvalu was represented at the 2022 Commonwealth Games in Birmingham, England, United Kingdom by the Tuvalu Association of Sports and National Olympic Committee.

In total, five athletes – all men – represented Tuvalu in three different sports including athletics, beach volleyball and boxing.

Tuvalu's team at the games consisted of Karalo Maibuca (men's 100 metres), Ampex Isaac and Saaga Malosa (men's beach volleyball), Leatialii Afoa (lightweight boxing) and Fiu Tui (middleweight boxing).

== Preparation ==
Due to the lack of facilities and the size of the island being small, athletes trained on the runway of the Funafuti International Airport. The airport is the biggest open space available on the island.

== Competitors ==
In total, five athletes represented Tuvalu at the 2022 Commonwealth Games in Birmingham, England, United Kingdom across three different sports.

Sport	Men	Women	Total
Athletics	1	0	1
Beach volleyball	2	0	2
Boxing	2	0	2
Total	5	0	5

== Athletics ==
In total, one Tuvaluan athlete participated in the athletics events – Karalo Maibuca in the men's 100 m.

The athletics events took place at Alexander Stadium in Perry Bar, Birmingham between 30 July and 7 August 2022.

Track and road events

Athlete	Event	Heat		Semifinal		Final	
Athlete	Event	Result	Rank	Result	Rank	Result	Rank
Karalo Maibuca	Men's 100 m	11.39	6	did not advance			

== Beach volleyball ==
In total, two Tuvaluan athletes participated in the beach volleyball events – Saaga Malosa and Ampex Isaac in the men's tournament.

The beach volleyball events took place at Smithfield, Birmingham between 30 July and 7 August 2022.

Athletes	Event	Preliminary Round				Quarterfinals	Semifinals	Final / BM	Rank
Athletes	Event	Opposition Score	Opposition Score	Opposition Score	Rank	Opposition Score	Opposition Score	Opposition Score	Rank
Saaga Malosa; Ampex Isaac	Men's	England; L 0―2	New Zealand; L 0―2	Cyprus; L 0―2	4	did not advance			

== Boxing ==
In total, two Tuvaluan athletes participated in the boxing events – Leatialii Afoa in the men's light heavyweight category and Fiu Tui in the men's middleweight category.

The boxing events took place at National Exhibition Centre (NEC) in Marston Green between 29 July and 7 August 2022.

Athlete	Event	Round of 32	Round of 16	Quarterfinals	Semifinals	Final	
Athlete	Event	Opposition Result	Opposition Result	Opposition Result	Opposition Result	Opposition Result	Rank
Fiu Tui	Middleweight	Bye	Moses (GRN); L 0―5	did not advance			
Leatialii Afoa	Light heavyweight	Bye	Langelier (LCA); L WO	did not advance			
