= Boxing at the 2022 Commonwealth Games – Men's light middleweight =

Boxing competitions

Boxing – Men's light middleweight at the 2022 Commonwealth Games
- Venue: National Exhibition Centre Hall 4
- Dates: July 29 – 7 August 2022
- Competitors: 21 from 21 nations

Medalists
gold medal	Aidan Walsh	Northern Ireland
silver medal	Tiago Muxanga	Mozambique
bronze medal	Garan Croft	Wales
bronze medal	Kassim Mbundwike	Tanzania

The men's light middleweight boxing competitions at the 2022 Commonwealth Games in Birmingham, England took place between July 29 and August 7 at National Exhibition Centre Hall 4. Light middleweights were limited to those boxers weighing less than 71 kilograms.

Like all Commonwealth boxing events, the competition was a straight single-elimination tournament. Both semifinal losers were awarded bronze medals, so no boxers competed again after their first loss. Bouts consisted of three rounds of three minutes each, with one-minute breaks between rounds.

== Schedule ==
The schedule is as follows:

Date	Round
Sunday 31 July	Preliminaries
Tuesday 2 August	Preliminaries
Thursday 4 August	Quarter-finals
Saturday 6 August	Semi-finals
Sunday 7 August 2022	Final

== Results ==
The draw is as follows:

=== Finals ===
Final
Aidan Walsh (NIR)	5
Tiago Muxanga (MOZ)	0

=== Top half ===
Preliminaries
Isaac Ssenyange (UGA)	1
Arena Pakela (LES)	4
Carl Hield (BAH)
Abdul-Afeez Osoba (NGR)	KO
Merven Clair (MRI)	5
Shain Boniface (SEY)	0

Preliminaries
Aidan Walsh (NIR)	5
Arena Pakela (LES)	0
Jessie Lartey (GHA)	0
Harris Akbar (ENG)	5
Garan Croft (WAL)	5
Abdul-Afeez Osoba (NGR)	0
Merven Clair (MRI)	5
Taha Ahmad (AUS)	0

Quarterfinals
Aidan Walsh (NIR)	3
Harris Akbar (ENG)	2
Garan Croft (WAL)	5
Merven Clair (MRI)	0

Semifinals
Aidan Walsh (NIR)	4
Garan Croft (WAL)	1

=== Bottom half ===
Preliminaries
Rafail Pafios (CYP)	5
Tawhiri Toheriri-Hallett (COK)	0
Albert Mengue (CMR)	3
Stephen Newns (SCO)	2

Preliminaries
Kassim Mbundwike (TAN)	3
Rafail Pafios (CYP)	2
Mario Ah Tong (SAM)	5
Niklas Vittalis (SRI)	0
Wendell Stanley (NZL)	RSC
Thabiso Dlamini (SWZ)
Albert Mengue (CMR)	0
Tiago Muxanga (MOZ)	5

Quarterfinals
Kassim Mbundwike (TAN)	RSC
Mario Ah Tong (SAM)
Wendell Stanley (NZL)	0
Tiago Muxanga (MOZ)	3

Semifinals
Kassim Mbundwike (TAN)	0
Tiago Muxanga (MOZ)	5
