= Stephen McKenna (boxer) =

Irish boxer (born 1997)

Personal information
- Nickname: Hitman
- Born: 15 February 1997 (age 29) Monaghan, Ireland
- Height: 6 ft 1 in (185 cm)
- Weight: Welterweight; Super welterweight

Boxing career
- Stance: Orthodox

Boxing record
- Total fights: 18
- Wins: 17
- Win by KO: 16
- Losses: 1
Medal record
Men's amateur boxing
Representing Ireland
Haringey Box Cup
Gold medal – first place	2014 London	Light-flyweight
European Youth Championships
Silver medal – second place	2015 Kolobrzeg	Light-flyweight
Commonwealth Youth Games
Gold medal – first place	2015 Apia	Light-flyweight
Irish National Championships
Gold medal – first place	2015 Irish U-18s Dublin	Light-flyweight
Gold medal – first place	2015 Irish Elites Dublin	Light-flyweight
Silver medal – second place	2017 Dublin	Bantamweight

Stephen McKenna (born 15 February 1997) is an Irish professional boxer. As an amateur he won a gold medal at the 2015 Commonwealth Youth Games and silver at the European Youth Championships in the same year.

== Amateur career ==
As an amateur McKenna compiled a record of 155–24. In 2015 he won gold medals at the Irish National Championships and Commonwealth Youth Games, and silver at the European Youth Championships, all in the light-flyweight division. In 2017 he moved up to the bantamweight division, winning a silver medal at the Irish National Championships.

== Professional career ==
After signing a promotional contract with Oscar De La Hoya's Golden Boy Promotions, Mckenna made his professional debut on 6 April 2019 against Trey Branch at the Pico Rivera Sports Arena in Pico Rivera, California. McKenna forced his opponent to the canvas with a barrage of punches in the first round. Branch made it to his feet before the referee's count of ten, only to be stunned by a left hand. McKenna followed up with a four punch combination, prompting the referee to call a halt to the contest to award McKenna a first-round knockout (KO) victory.

He secured three more wins in 2019; first-round KOs against Keasen Freeman in June and Keahola Helm in August; and a second-round KO against Gonzalo Dallera in November.

McKenna's first fight of 2020 was his first in Europe, scoring a first-round KO against Gary McGuire in September at the Production Park Studios in South Kirkby, England.

He won the vacant WBC International Silver super-welterweight title with a third round stoppage win over Joe Lawes at Oakwell Stadium in Barnsley, English, on 3 August 2024.

McKenna lost the title and his unbeaten professional record to Lee Cutler at the Exhibition Centre in Liverpool, England, on 14 December 2024. He lost the fight by majority decision with two of the ringside judges scoring the contest 96–92 and 95–93 respectively in favour of his opponent, while the third had it a 94–94 draw.

Having signed a promotional deal with Zuffa Boxing, McKenna made his return to competitive boxing after almost 18 months away at the International Centre in Bournemouth, England, on 6 June 2026 stopping Casey James Streeter in the first of their scheduled eight-round contest.

In his next fight, McKenna defeated Owen O'Neill via first round technical knockout at 3Arena in Dublin on 8 August 2026.

== Personal life ==
His brother, Aaron, is also a professional boxer.

== Professional boxing record ==
17 fights	16 wins	1 loss
By knockout	16	0
By decision	1	1

No.	Result	Record	Opponent	Type	Round, time	Date	Location	Notes
18	Win	17–1	Owen O'Neill	TKO	1 (8), 1:05	8 Aug 2026	3Arena, Dublin, Ireland	
17	Win	16–1	Casey James Streeter	TKO	1 (8), 1:04	6 Jun 2026	Bournemouth International Centre, Bournemouth, England	
16	Loss	15–1	Lee Cutler	MD	10	14 Dec 2024	Exhibition Centre, Liverpool, England	Lost WBC International Silver super welterweight title
15	Win	15–0	Joe Laws	RTD	3 (10), 3:00	3 Aug 2024	Oakwell Stadium, Barnsley, England	Won vacant WBC International Silver super welterweight title
14	Win	14–0	Darren Tetley	RTD	6 (8), 3:00	30 Sep 2023	York Hall, London, England	
13	Win	13–0	Brendon Denes	RTD	4 (8), 3:00	11 Feb 2023	Wembley Arena, Wembley, England	
12	Win	12–0	Facundo Alberto Rojas	TKO	2 (8), 2:59	30 Jul 2022	Bournemouth International Centre, Bournemouth, England	
11	Win	11–0	Jack Ewbank	TKO	1 (6), 1:08	10 Dec 2021	National Sports Centre, Crystal Palace, England	
10	Win	10–0	Richmond Djarbeng	KO	1 (8), 0:42	13 Nov 2021	Skydome, Coventry, England	
9	Win	9–0	Moussa Gary	PTS	6	10 Sep 2021	Skydome, Coventry, England	
8	Win	8–0	Damian Haus	TKO	1 (6), 2:52	22 May 2021	Skydome, Coventry, England	
7	Win	7–0	Des Newton	TKO	3 (6), 0:36	18 Dec 2020	Fly By Nite Rehearsal Studios, Redditch, England	
6	Win	6–0	MJ Hall	TKO	5 (6), 1:54	11 Dec 2020	Fly By Nite Rehearsal Studios, Redditch, England	
5	Win	5–0	Gary McGuire	KO	1 (6), 1:13	5 Sep 2020	Production Park Studios, South Kirkby, England	
4	Win	4–0	Gonzalo Carlos Dallera	KO	2 (6), 0:29	9 Nov 2019	Gardens Casino, Hawaiian Gardens, California, U.S.	
3	Win	3–0	Kealoha Helm	KO	1 (4), 1:15	3 Aug 2019	Gardens Casino, Hawaiian Gardens, California, U.S.	
2	Win	2–0	Keasen Freeman	KO	1 (4), 1:33	13 Jun 2019	The Hangar, Costa Mesa, California, U.S.	
1	Win	1–0	Trey Branch	KO	1 (4), 2:54	6 Apr 2019	Pico Rivera Sports Arena, Pico Rivera, California, U.S.	
