= Tuvalu at the 2010 Commonwealth Games =

- CGF code: TUV
- CGA: Tuvalu Association of Sports and National Olympic Committee
- Website: oceaniasport.com/tuvalu

in Delhi, India
- Competitors: 3 in 3 sports
- Medals: Gold 0 Silver 0 Bronze 0 Total 0

Commonwealth Games appearances (overview)
- 1998; 2002; 2006; 2010; 2014; 2018; 2022; 2026; 2030

Tuvalu competed in the 2010 Commonwealth Games held in Delhi, India, from 3 to 14 October 2010. It sent three athletes to compete in the discus, shot put and weightlifting events.

Tuau Lapua Lapua finished in 15th position in men's final for weightlifting (62 kg), with a lift of 220 kg.

Fakepelu Sileti entered both the discus throw and the shot put events and reached 14th position in the qualifying rounds of the men's shot put, with a distance of 12.62 metres.

== See also ==
- 2010 Commonwealth Games
