= Brandon Daord =

English boxer (born 1997)

Personal information
- Nickname: The Don
- Born: Brandon Lee Daord; 21 April 1997 (age 29) Liverpool, England
- Height: 5 ft 6 in (168 cm)
- Weight: Super-flyweight, Flyweight

Boxing career
- Stance: Southpaw

Boxing record
- Total fights: 12
- Wins: 12
- Win by KO: 3
Medal record
Boxing
Representing England
Commonwealth Youth Games
Bronze medal – third place	2015 Samoa	Flyweight

Brandon Daord (born 4 March 1997) is an English professional boxer. He is a former British and English super-flyweight champion.

== Amateur career ==
Daord started boxing aged eight. Representing England, he won a bronze medal in the flyweight category at the 2015 Commonwealth Youth Games in Samoa. Daord was also an eight-time national amateur champion.

== Professional career ==
Unbeaten in his first nine professional fights, Daord faced Benn Norman for the vacant English super-flyweight title at the Winter Gardens in Blackpool on 2 December 2023. He won by unanimous decision.

After more than a year away from the ring, he returned to defeat Matty McHale via unanimous decision at the Caledonia Gladiators Arena in East Kilbride on 8 February 2025, to claim the vacant British super-flyweight title.

Following another 12 months of inactivity, Daord fought Keyvin Lara for the vacant WBC International flyweight title at Boxpark in Liverpool on 28 February 2026. He won by unanimous decision.

Daord was scheduled to return to the same venue to face fellow unbeaten boxer, Ndabezinhle Phiri, for the vacant IBO flyweight title on 12 September 2026. However, he suffered an injury and the fight was postponed until 21 November 2026 with the location remaining unchanged. Daord failed to make the required championship weight and the bout was subsequently cancelled.

== Professional boxing record ==
12 fights	12 wins	0 losses
By knockout	3	0
By decision	9	0

No.	Result	Record	Opponent	Type	Round, time	Date	Location	Notes
12	Win	12–0	Keyvin Lara	UD	10	28 Feb 2026	Boxpark, Liverpool, England	Won vacant WBC International flyweight title
11	Win	11–0	Matty McHale	UD	12	8 Feb 2025	Caledonia Gladiators Arena, East Kilbride, Scotland	Won vacant British super-flyweight title
10	Win	10–0	Benn Norman	UD	10	2 Dec 2023	Winter Garden, Blackpool, England	Won vacant English super-flyweight title
9	Win	9–0	Stephen Jackson	PTS	6	23 Sep 2023	Grand Central Hall, Liverpool, England	
8	Win	8–0	Alexander Taylor	PTS	6	24 Sep 2022	Olympia, Liverpool, England	
7	Win	7–0	Reiss Taylor	PTS	4	8 Apr 2022	Winter Gardens, Blackpool, England	
6	Win	6–0	Adam Yahaya	TKO	3 (6), 2:09	26 Nov 2021	Olympia, Liverpool, England	
5	Win	5–0	Marius Vysniauskas	TKO	4 (6), 2:43	15 Oct 2021	Olympia, Liverpool, England	
4	Win	4–0	Georgi Andonov	TKO	2 (4), 2:45	4 Nov 2017	Bowlers Exhibition Centre, Manchester, England	
3	Win	3–0	Anwar Alfadli	PTS	4	30 Jun 2017	Fusion Nightclub, Fleet Street, Liverpool, England	
2	Win	2–0	Stefan Slavchev	PTS	4	7 Oct 2016	Greenbank Sports Academy, Liverpool, England	
1	Win	1–0	Sergey Tasimov	PTS	4	18 Jun 2016	Guild Hall, Preston, England	
