= Matthew McHale =

Scottish boxer (born 1996)

Personal information
- Nationality: Scottish
- Born: 1 May 1996 (age 30)

Boxing career
Medal record
Men's amateur boxing
Representing Scotland
Commonwealth Games
Bronze medal – third place	2022 Birmingham	Bantamweight

Matthew McHale (born 1 May 1996) is a Scottish boxer. He competed at the 2022 Commonwealth Games in the boxing competition, winning the bronze medal in the men's bantamweight event. He previously competed at the 2021 AIBA World Boxing Championships in the bantamweight event.

McHale turned professional in November 2022. He fought Brandon Daord for the vacant British super-flyweight title at the Caledonia Gladiators Arena in East Kilbride on 8 February 2025, losing by unanimous decision.
