= 2022 European Amateur Boxing Championships =

Boxing competitions

- Host city: Yerevan
- Country: Armenia
- Nations: 39
- Athletes: 219
- Events: 13
- Dates: 23–30 May
- Main venue: Karen Demirchyan Complex

The Men's 2022 European Amateur Boxing Championships were held in the Yerevan, Armenia from 23 to 30 May 2022. It is the 44th edition of this biennial competition organised by the European governing body for amateur boxing, the EUBC.

== Schedule ==
Date	Round
23-26 May 2022	Preliminaries
27 May 2022	Quarterfinals
29 May 2022	Semifinals
30 May 2022	Finals

== Medal winners ==
Event	Gold	Silver	Bronze
Minimumweight (46–48kg)	Sakhil Alakhverdovi; Georgia	Ergyunal Sebahtin; Bulgaria	Jakub Słomiński; Poland
Minimumweight (46–48kg)	Sakhil Alakhverdovi; Georgia	Ergyunal Sebahtin; Bulgaria	Leonardo Esposito; Italy
Flyweight (48–51kg)	Martín Molina; Spain	Kiaran MacDonald; England	Dmytro Zamotayev; Ukraine
Flyweight (48–51kg)	Martín Molina; Spain	Kiaran MacDonald; England	Federico Serra; Italy
Bantamweight (51–54kg)	Billal Bennama; France	Dylan Eagleson; Ireland	Manuel Cappai; Italy
Bantamweight (51–54kg)	Billal Bennama; France	Dylan Eagleson; Ireland	Daniel Asenov; Bulgaria
Featherweight (54–57kg)	Vasile Usturoi; Belgium	Artur Bazeyan; Armenia	Michele Baldassi; Italy
Featherweight (54–57kg)	Vasile Usturoi; Belgium	Artur Bazeyan; Armenia	Javier Ibáñez; Bulgaria
Lightweight (57-60kg)	Artush Gomtsyan; Georgia	José Quiles; Spain	Roland Veres; Hungary
Lightweight (57-60kg)	Artush Gomtsyan; Georgia	José Quiles; Spain	Iurii Shestak; Ukraine
Light welterweight (60–63.5kg)	Hovhannes Bachkov; Armenia	Lounès Hamraoui; France	Richárd Kovács; Hungary
Light welterweight (60–63.5kg)	Hovhannes Bachkov; Armenia	Lounès Hamraoui; France	Adrián Thiam; Spain
Welterweight (63.5–67kg)	Vahid Abasov; Serbia	Lasha Guruli; Georgia	Alexandru Paraschiv; Moldova
Welterweight (63.5–67kg)	Vahid Abasov; Serbia	Lasha Guruli; Georgia	Ioan Croft; Wales
Light middleweight (67–71kg)	Harris Akbar; England	Garan Croft; Wales	Yurii Zakharieiev; Ukraine
Light middleweight (67–71kg)	Harris Akbar; England	Garan Croft; Wales	Magomed Schachidov; Germany
Middleweight (71–75kg)	Gabriel Dossen; Ireland	Lewis Richardson; England	Salvatore Cavallaro; Italy
Middleweight (71–75kg)	Gabriel Dossen; Ireland	Lewis Richardson; England	Sam Hickey; Scotland
Light heavyweight (75–80kg)	Artem Ageev; Serbia	Alfred Commey; Italy	Luka Plantić; Croatia
Light heavyweight (75–80kg)	Artem Ageev; Serbia	Alfred Commey; Italy	Ivan Sapun; Ukraine
Cruiserweight (80–86kg)	Georgii Kushitashvili; Georgia	Rafayel Hovhannisyan; Armenia	Andrei Arădoaie; Romania
Cruiserweight (80–86kg)	Georgii Kushitashvili; Georgia	Rafayel Hovhannisyan; Armenia	Tomasz Niedźwiecki; Poland
Heavyweight (86–92kg)	Aziz Abbes Mouhiidine; Italy	Enmanuel Reyes; Spain	Lewis Williams; England
Heavyweight (86–92kg)	Aziz Abbes Mouhiidine; Italy	Enmanuel Reyes; Spain	Narek Manasyan; Armenia
Super heavyweight (+92kg)	Nelvie Tiafack; Germany	Ayoub Ghadfa; Spain	Delicious Orie; England
Super heavyweight (+92kg)	Nelvie Tiafack; Germany	Ayoub Ghadfa; Spain	Ahmed Hagag; Austria

=== Medal table ===
* Host nation (Armenia)

Rank	Nation	Gold	Silver	Bronze	Total
1	Georgia	3	1	0	4
2	Serbia	2	0	0	2
3	Spain	1	3	1	5
4	England	1	2	2	5
5	Armenia*	1	2	1	4
6	Italy	1	1	5	7
7	France	1	1	0	2
7	Ireland	1	1	0	2
9	Germany	1	0	1	2
10	Belgium	1	0	0	1
11	Bulgaria	0	1	2	3
12	Wales	0	1	1	2
13	Ukraine	0	0	4	4
14	Hungary	0	0	2	2
14	Poland	0	0	2	2
16	Austria	0	0	1	1
16	Croatia	0	0	1	1
16	Moldova	0	0	1	1
16	Romania	0	0	1	1
16	Scotland	0	0	1	1
Totals (20 entries)		13	13	26	52

== Participating nations ==
219 boxers from 39 countries registered to compete at the 2022 European championships.

NOC	Men													Total
NOC	48 kg	51 kg	54 kg	57 kg	60 kg	63.5 kg	67 kg	71 kg	75 kg	80 kg	86 kg	92 kg	92+kg	Total
Albania								Yes						1
Armenia (host)	Yes	Yes	Yes	Yes	Yes	Yes	Yes	Yes	Yes	Yes	Yes	Yes	Yes	13
Austria									Yes				Yes	2
Belgium			Yes	Yes							Yes			3
Bosnia and Herzegovina				Yes								Yes	Yes	3
Bulgaria	Yes		Yes	Yes	Yes	Yes	Yes		Yes	Yes	Yes	Yes	Yes	11
Croatia						Yes	Yes	Yes		Yes	Yes			5
Czech Republic						Yes			Yes				Yes	3
Denmark					Yes									1
England		Yes		Yes		Yes		Yes	Yes	Yes		Yes	Yes	8
Estonia								Yes		Yes				2
Finland					Yes		Yes	Yes		Yes				4
France			Yes			Yes			Yes			Yes	Yes	5
Georgia	Yes	Yes			Yes		Yes	Yes	Yes	Yes	Yes	Yes	Yes	10
Germany		Yes	Yes		Yes	Yes	Yes	Yes	Yes	Yes			Yes	9
Greece		Yes			Yes				Yes	Yes		Yes		5
Hungary		Yes	Yes	Yes	Yes	Yes	Yes	Yes	Yes				Yes	9
Iceland													Yes	1
Ireland	Yes	Yes	Yes	Yes	Yes	Yes	Yes	Yes	Yes			Yes		10
Israel		Yes				Yes	Yes	Yes						4
Italy	Yes	Yes	Yes	Yes	Yes		Yes	Yes	Yes	Yes	Yes	Yes	Yes	12
Lithuania					Yes				Yes				Yes	3
Luxembourg											Yes			1
Moldova					Yes	Yes	Yes	Yes	Yes	Yes	Yes	Yes	Yes	9
Montenegro					Yes			Yes		Yes	Yes			4
Netherlands							Yes	Yes		Yes				3
Norway									Yes				Yes	2
Poland	Yes			Yes	Yes		Yes	Yes	Yes	Yes	Yes	Yes	Yes	10
Romania											Yes	Yes	Yes	3
Scotland		Yes	Yes			Yes	Yes	Yes	Yes					6
Serbia		Yes	Yes			Yes	Yes	Yes	Yes	Yes	Yes	Yes	Yes	10
Slovakia					Yes			Yes		Yes	Yes	Yes		5
Slovenia						Yes								1
Spain		Yes	Yes	Yes	Yes	Yes		Yes	Yes	Yes		Yes	Yes	10
Sweden				Yes					Yes	Yes				3
Switzerland								Yes						1
Turkey	Yes	Yes	Yes	Yes		Yes	Yes	Yes	Yes		Yes		Yes	10
Ukraine	Yes	Yes	Yes	Yes	Yes	Yes	Yes	Yes	Yes	Yes	Yes	Yes	Yes	13
Wales		Yes					Yes	Yes		Yes				4

Belarusian and Russian boxers are not allowed to compete at the event after a ban as a result of the Russian invasion of Ukraine.

Due ongoing tension between Azerbaijan and Armenia, Azerbaijan decided not to send any boxers to 2022 European championships.
