= Tuvalu at the 2026 Commonwealth Games =

- Flag of Tuvalu
- CG code: TUV
- CGA: Tuvalu Association of Sports and National Olympic Committee
- Website: facebook.com/TASNOC (Facebook)

in Glasgow, Scotland 23 July 2026 – 2 August 2026
- Competitors: 8 in 3 sports
- Flag bearer: Pasoni Taafaki
- Baton bearer: Malia Timo
- Medals Ranked =36th: Gold 0 Silver 0 Bronze 1 Total 1

Commonwealth Games appearances (overview)
- 1998; 2002; 2006; 2010; 2014; 2018; 2022; 2026; 2030

Tuvalu competed at the 2026 Commonwealth Games in Glasgow, Scotland. This marked Tuvalu's eighth participation at the games, after making its debut at the 1998 Commonwealth Games.

The King's Baton relay stopped in Tuvalu in February 2026. The Tuvalu team consisted of eight athletes (five men and three women) competing in three sports.

Boxer Pasoni Taafaki was the country's flagbearer during the opening ceremony. Meanwhile, weightlifter Malia Timo was the King's Baton Bearer during the opening ceremony. Boxer Tarona Taafaki won Tuvalu's first ever Commonwealth Games medal, a bronze in the women's 75 kg event.

== Competitors ==
The following is the list of number of competitors participating at the Games per sport/discipline.

Sport	Men	Women	Total
Athletics	4	1	5
Boxing	1	1	2
Weightlifting	0	1	1
Total	5	3	8

== Medalists ==
The following competitor won a medal at the games. In the by discipline sections below, medallists' names are bolded.

Medal	Name	Sport	Event	Date	Ref.
Bronze	Tarona Taafaki	Boxing	Women's 75 kg	31 July	

== Athletics ==
Tuvalu entered five track and field athletes (four men and one woman).

Track

Athlete	Event	Heat		Semifinal		Final	
Athlete	Event	Result	Rank	Result	Rank	Result	Rank
Usufono Eneli	Men's 100 m	11.48	70	Did not advance			
Maketi Faaniu Kesili	Men's 100 m	11.71	72	Did not advance			
Kanaee Malua	Men's 100 m	11.56	71	Did not advance			
Usufono Eneli	Men's 200 m	23.07	56	Did not advance			
Kanaee Malua	Men's 200 m	23.79	58	Did not advance			
Howard Tapuaiga Siila	Men's 400 m	55.96	56	Did not advance			
Howard Tapuaiga Siila	Men's 800 m	2:32.38	31	Did not advance			
Vaioleta Luka	Women's 100 m	13.56	51	Did not advance			
Vaioleta Luka	Women's 200 m	DSQ		Did not advance			

Field

Athlete	Event	Qualification		Final	
Athlete	Event	Distance	Rank	Distance	Rank
Usufono Eneli	Men's javelin throw	39.28	17	Did not advance	

== Boxing ==
Tuvalu entered two boxers, one of each sex. Siblings Pasoni Taafaki and Tarona Taafaki were the two boxers who represented the country. Boxer Tarona Taafaki won Tuvalu's first ever medal at the Commonwealth Games. Tarona Taafaki was also the first female boxer to represent Tuvalu at the Commonwealth Games.

Athlete	Event	Round of 32	Round of 16	Quarterfinals	Semifinals	Final	
Athlete	Event	Opposition Result	Opposition Result	Opposition Result	Opposition Result	Opposition Result	Rank
Pasoni Taafaki	Men's 70 kg	Bye	Clair (MRI); **L** 0–5	Did not advance			
**Tarona Taafaki**	Women's 75 kg	—N/a		Bye	Borgohain (IND); **L** 0–5	Did not advance	3rd place, bronze medalist(s)

== Weightlifting ==
Tuvalu qualified one female weightlifter.

Athlete	Event	Snatch (kg)		Clean & Jerk (kg)		Total (kg)	Rank
Athlete	Event	Result	Rank	Result	Rank	Total (kg)	Rank
Malia Timo	Women's +86 kg	84	10	110	9	194	8

== See also ==
- Tuvalu at the 2023 Pacific Games
