= Savannah Stubley =

English boxer (born 2001)

Personal information
- Born: Savannah Alfia Stubley; 18 July 2001 (age 24) Lynemouth, Northumberland, England
- Height: 160 cm (5 ft 3 in)
- Weight: Light-flyweight

Boxing career
Medal record
Women's amateur boxing
Representing England
Commonwealth Games
Bronze medal – third place	2022 Birmingham	Light Flyweight

Savannah Alfia Stubley (born 18 July 2001) is an English boxer who competed at the 2022 Commonwealth Games in Light Flyweight winning a bronze medal.
