= Tuvalu at the 2018 Commonwealth Games =

- Flag of Tuvalu
- CGF code: TUV
- CGA: Tuvalu Association of Sports and National Olympic Committee
- Website: oceaniasport.com/tuvalu

in Gold Coast, Australia 4 April 2018 – 15 April 2018
- Competitors: 7 in 4 sports
- Flag bearer: Manuila Raobu (opening)
- Medals: Gold 0 Silver 0 Bronze 0 Total 0

Commonwealth Games appearances (overview)
- 1998; 2002; 2006; 2010; 2014; 2018; 2022; 2026; 2030

Tuvalu competed at the 2018 Commonwealth Games in the Gold Coast, Australia from April 4 to April 15, 2018.

Weightlifter Manuila Raobu was the island's flag bearer during the opening ceremony.

== Competitors ==
The following is the list of number of competitors participating at the Games per sport/discipline.

Sport	Men	Women	Total
Athletics	2	0	2
Swimming	1	0	1
Table tennis	2	1	3
Weightlifting	1	0	1
Total	6	1	7

== Athletics ==
Tuvalu participated with 2 athletes (2 men).

Men
Track & road events

Athlete	Event	Heat		Semifinal		Final	
Athlete	Event	Result	Rank	Result	Rank	Result	Rank
Karalo Maibuca	100 m	11.98	8	did not advance			

Field events

Athlete	Event	Qualification		Final	
Athlete	Event	Distance	Rank	Distance	Rank
Imo Fiamalua	Javelin throw	52.84	22	did not advance	

== Swimming ==
Tuvalu participated with 1 athlete (1 man).

Men

Athlete	Event	Heat		Semifinal		Final	
Athlete	Event	Time	Rank	Time	Rank	Time	Rank
Faletiute Tinapa	50 m freestyle	DSQ		did not advance			
Faletiute Tinapa	50 m backstroke	34.94	20	did not advance			
Faletiute Tinapa	50 m breaststroke	38.44	33	did not advance			

== Table tennis ==
Tuvalu participated with 3 athletes (2 men and 1 woman).

Singles

Athletes	Event	Group Stage			Round of 64	Round of 32	Round of 16	Quarterfinal	Semifinal	Final	Rank
Athletes	Event	Opposition Score	Opposition Score	Rank	Opposition Score	Opposition Score	Opposition Score	Opposition Score	Opposition Score	Opposition Score	Rank
Kalton Melton	Men's singles	Shing (VAN); L 0 - 4	Wilson (TTO); L 0 - 4	3	did not advance						
Tulimanu Vaea	Men's singles	Wu (FIJ); L 0 - 4	Tumaini (TAN); L 0 - 4	3	did not advance						
Brenda Katepu	Women's singles	Tommy (VAN); L 0 - 4	Pazi (TAN); L 0 - 4	3	—	did not advance					

Doubles

Athletes	Event	Round of 64	Round of 32	Round of 16	Quarterfinal	Semifinal	Final	Rank
Athletes	Event	Opposition Score	Opposition Score	Opposition Score	Opposition Score	Opposition Score	Opposition Score	Rank
Kalton Melton; Tulimanu Vaea	Men's doubles	Bye	McCreery; Robinson (NIR); L 0 - 3	did not advance				
Brenda Katepu; Tulimanu Vaea	Mixed doubles	Beh KT; Zhang WL (SGP); L 0 - 3	did not advance					

== Weightlifting ==
Tuvalu participated with 1 athlete (1 man).

Athlete	Event	Snatch		Clean & Jerk		Total	Rank
Athlete	Event	Result	Rank	Result	Rank	Total	Rank
Manuila Raobu	Men's −62 kg	95	14	121	13	216	13

== See also ==
- Tuvalu at the 2018 Summer Youth Olympics
