= Jude Gallagher =

Irish boxer (born 2001)

Personal information
- Nationality: Irish
- Born: 5 October 2001 (age 25) Derry, Northern Ireland
- Height: 170 cm (5 ft 7 in)

Boxing career
Medal record
Men's amateur boxing
Representing Ireland
Youth World Championships
Bronze medal – third place	2018 Budapest	Light flyweight
Representing Northern Ireland
Commonwealth Games
Gold medal – first place	2022 Birmingham	Featherweight
Bronze medal – third place	2026 Glasgow	60 kg

Jude Gallagher (born 5 October 2001) is a boxer who represents Ireland and Northern Ireland. He competed at the 2022 Commonwealth Games, winning the gold medal in the men's featherweight event. Gallagher defeated Joseph Commey via walkover in the final match in the boxing competition.

Gallagher represented Ireland at the 2024 Summer Olympics, receiving a bye into the second round where he lost to Carlo Paalam from the Philippines by unanimous decision.

Representing Northern Ireland, he won a bronze medal at the 2026 Commonwealth Games in the 60 kg division.
