= Ioan Croft =

Welsh boxer

Personal information
- Born: 30 November 2001 (age 24) Crymych, Pembrokeshire, Wales
- Height: 186 cm (6 ft 1 in)
- Weight: Middleweight

Boxing career
- Stance: Southpaw

Boxing record
- Total fights: 5
- Wins: 5
- Win by KO: 3
- Losses: 0
- Draws: 0
- No contests: 0
Medal record
Men's amateur boxing
Representing Wales
Commonwealth Games
Gold medal – first place	2022 Birmingham	Welterweight
European Championships
Bronze medal – third place	2022 Yerevan	Welterweight

Ioan Croft (born 30 November 2001) is a Welsh amateur boxer who won a bronze medal at the 2022 European Championships. His twin brother, Garan, is also an amateur boxer.

Both twins, who come from Crymych, took up boxing at Cardigan ABC and are Welsh-speaking. They were featured in an S4C television documentary prior to the Commonwealth Games 2022, at which they both represented Wales. At the Games Ioan won a gold medal and Garan bronze.

Ioan fights at welterweight division, his brother Garan at light-middleweight. Their mother insists that they do not fight against one another in a competitive bout.
