= Tyler Jolly =

Scottish boxer (born 1999)

Personal information
- Nickname: Hotdog
- Nationality: Scottish
- Born: 29 July 1999 (age 26)
- Weight: Light middleweight

Boxing career

Boxing record
- Total fights: 6
- Wins: 6
- Win by KO: 4
Medal record
Men's amateur boxing
Representing Scotland
Commonwealth Games
Bronze medal – third place	2022 Birmingham	Welterweight

Tyler Jolly (born 29 July 1999) is a Scottish boxer, who is the current BBBoC Celtic Welterweight Champion. He competed at the 2022 Commonwealth Games in the boxing competition, winning the bronze medal in the men's welterweight event. He previously competed at the 2021 AIBA World Boxing Championships in the welterweight event, winning no medal.

== Professional boxing record ==
6 fights	6 wins	0 losses
By knockout	4	0
By decision	2	0

No.	Result	Record	Opponent	Type	Round, time	Date	Location	Notes
6	Win	6–0	Jake Tinklin	TKO	10, 0.00	Jun 20, 2025	Playsport Arena, East Kilbride, Scotland	Won vacant BBBoC Celtic welterweight title
5	Win	5–0	Nathan Darby	UD	4	Aug 22, 2008	Playsport Arena, East Kilbride, Scotland	
4	Win	4–0	Dmitri Protkunas	UD	4	Aug 22, 2008	Radisson Blu, Glasgow, Scotland	
3	Win	3–0	Damian Haus	TKO	1, 1:46	Nov 18, 2023	Aura Complex, Letterkenny, Ireland	
2	Win	2–0	Frank Madsen	TKO	4, 2:30	Sep 1, 2023	Braehead Arena, Glasgow, Scotland	
1	Win	1–0	Wojtech Majer	TKO	1	Jan 04, 2023	National Stadium, Dublin, Ireland	
