= Tuvalu at the 2014 Commonwealth Games =

- CGF code: TUV
- CGA: Tuvalu Association of Sports and National Olympic Committee
- Website: oceaniasport.com/tuvalu

in Glasgow, Scotland
- Competitors: 5 in 2 sports
- Flag bearer: Lapua Lapua
- Medals: Gold 0 Silver 0 Bronze 0 Total 0

Commonwealth Games appearances (overview)
- 1998; 2002; 2006; 2010; 2014; 2018; 2022; 2026; 2030

Tuvalu sent a team to the 2014 Commonwealth Games in Glasgow, Scotland from July 23 to August 3, 2014. It comprised five athletes in two sports: table tennis and weightlifting. The country remained medalless after its fifth Commonwealth Games.

== Table tennis ==
Singles

Athlete	Event	Group Stage			Round of 64	Round of 32	Round of 16	Quarterfinals	Semifinals	Final	Rank
Athlete	Event	Opposition Result	Opposition Result	Rank	Opposition Result	Opposition Result	Opposition Result	Opposition Result	Opposition Result	Opposition Result	Rank
Alan Resture	Men's Singles	P Mutambuze (UGA); L 0–4	M Chowdhury (BAN); L 0–4	3	did not advance						
Kaimalie Resture	Women's Singles	R Chung (TRI); L 0–4	N Mwaisyula (TAN); L 0–4	3	did not advance						

Doubles

Athlete	Event	Round of 64	Round of 32	Round of 16	Quarterfinals	Semifinals	Final	Rank
Athlete	Event	Opposition Result	Opposition Result	Opposition Result	Opposition Result	Opposition Result	Opposition Result	Rank
Kaimalie Resture; Alan Resture	Mixed Doubles	Malaysia; L 0–3	did not advance					

== Weightlifting ==
Athlete	Event	Snatch		Clean & Jerk		Total	Rank
Athlete	Event	Result	Rank	Result	Rank	Total	Rank
Lapua Lapua	Men's −62 kg	No Mark		did not finish			
Logona Esau	Men's −77 kg	113	16	154	12	267	12
Kaie Luenita	Women's −69 kg	45	12	50	12	95	12

== See also ==
- Tuvalu at the 2014 Summer Youth Olympics
