= Tuvalu at the 2006 Commonwealth Games =

- CGF code: TUV
- CGA: Tuvalu Association of Sports and National Olympic Committee
- Website: oceaniasport.com/tuvalu

in Melbourne, Australia
- Competitors: 4
- Officials: 1
- Medals: Gold 0 Silver 0 Bronze 0 Total 0

Commonwealth Games appearances (overview)
- 1998; 2002; 2006; 2010; 2014; 2018; 2022; 2026; 2030

Tuvalu was represented at the 2006 Commonwealth Games in Melbourne by a 5-member strong contingent comprising 4 sportspersons and 1 official. Tuvalu entered competitors in shooting, table tennis and weightlifting. 2006 marked Tuvalu's third participation in the Commonwealth Games.

== Medals and results ==
	(gold)	(silver)	(bronze)	Total
Tuvalu	0	0	0	0

Geoffrey Ludbrook competed in shooting, in the men's 50m rifle prone, and finished 32nd out of 38 competitors.

Alan Puga Resture & Napetari Tioti took part in the men's doubles in table tennis, and failed to reach the round of sixteen. In the men's Team Event, Tuvalu's table tennis players finished 26th out of 27 teams.

In weightlifting, Logona Esau finished twelfth out of fifteen in the men's 69 kg Combined.
