= Tuvalu at the 2002 Commonwealth Games =

- CG code: TUV
- CGA: Tuvalu Association of Sports and National Olympic Committee
- Website: oceaniasport.com/tuvalu

in Manchester, England
- Medals: Gold 0 Silver 0 Bronze 0 Total 0

Commonwealth Games appearances (overview)
- 1998; 2002; 2006; 2010; 2014; 2018; 2022; 2026; 2030

Tuvalu sent a small delegation of table tennis players only to the 2002 Commonwealth Games in Manchester. 2002 marked Tuvalu's second participation in the Commonwealth Games. The tiny Pacific nation did not win any medals.

== Medals ==
	Gold	Silver	Bronze	Total
Tuvalu	0	0	0	0

Tuvaluans took part in the men's doubles in table tennis, and failed to reach the round of sixteen.

In the men's singles, the country was represented by Alan Puga Resture and Teokila Maleko, who failed to win a medal.

== Sources ==
- Official results
