= Boxing at the 2026 Commonwealth Games – Men's 60 kg =

Boxing competitions

Boxing – Men's 60 kg at the 2026 Commonwealth Games
- Venue: SEC Centre
- Dates: July 25 – 1 August 2026
- Competitors: 23 from 23 nations

Medalists
gold medal	Sachin Siwach	India
silver medal	Tryagain Ndevelo	Namibia
bronze medal	Owain Harris-Allan	Wales
bronze medal	Jude Gallagher	Northern Ireland

The men's 60 kg boxing competitions at the 2026 Commonwealth Games in Glasgow, Scotland took place between July 25 and August 1 at the SEC Centre.

Like all Commonwealth boxing events, the competition was a straight single-elimination tournament. Both semifinal losers were awarded bronze medals, so no boxers competed again after their first loss. Bouts consisted of three rounds of three minutes each, with one-minute breaks between rounds.

== Schedule ==
The schedule was as follows:

Date	Round
Saturday 25 July	Preliminaries
Monday 27 July	Preliminaries
Wednesday 29 July	Quarter-finals
Friday 31 July	Semi-finals
Saturday 1 August	Final

== Results ==
The draw was as follows:

=== Bracket ===
Preliminaries
Nicholas Devlin (SCO)	5
Finbar O'Sullivan (NZL)	0
Phoenix Gataua (NIU)	0
Treasure Moremi (BOT)	5
Keoma Al-Ahmadieh (CAN)	1
Sachin Siwach (IND)	4
Ibrahim Kemis (UGA)	0
Albert Ngulube (ZAM)	5
Qudrat Ullah (PAK)	5
Jone Davule (FIJ)	0
Tryagain Ndevelo (NAM)	WO
Anthony Joseph (TTO)
Max Makana (SOL)	0
Ravindu Jayantha (SRI)	5

Round of 16
Ebenezer Ankrah (GHA)	2
Nicholas Devlin (SCO)	3
Owain Harris-Allan (WAL)	5
Niven Chemben (MRI)	0
Toka Litabe (LES)	2
Treasure Moremi (BOT)	3
Sachin Siwach (IND)	4
William Hewitt (ENG)	1
Mukelo Dlamini (SWZ)	0
Albert Ngulube (ZAM)	5
Qudrat Ullah (PAK)	0
Jude Gallagher (NIR)	4
Md Ruhin Reza (BAN)	0
Tryagain Ndevelo (NAM)	5
Ravindu Jayantha (SRI)	1
Niall Adams (GGY)	4

Quarterfinals
Nicholas Devlin (SCO)	0
Owain Harris-Allan (WAL)	5
Treasure Moremi (BOT)	0
Sachin Siwach (IND)	5
Albert Ngulube (ZAM)	2
Jude Gallagher (NIR)	3
Tryagain Ndevelo (NAM)	5
Niall Adams (GGY)	0

Semifinals
Owain Harris-Allan (WAL)	0
Sachin Siwach (IND)	5
Jude Gallagher (NIR)	2
Tryagain Ndevelo (NAM)	3

Final
Sachin Siwach (IND)	3
Tryagain Ndevelo (NAM)	2
