= Jake Dodd =

Welsh boxer (born 1995)

Personal information
- Nationality: Wales
- Born: 4 February 1995 (age 31)

Boxing career
Medal record
Boxing
Representing Wales
Commonwealth Games
| Bronze medal – third place | 2022 Birmingham | Men's flyweight |

Jake Dodd (born 4 February 1995) is a Welsh boxer. He competes in the men's flyweight event category. He competed in the 2022 Commonwealth Games, winning the bronze medal.
