= Lee Cutler =

English boxer (born 1995)

Personal information
- Nickname: Chaos
- Born: 28 December 1995 (age 30) Bournemouth, Dorset, England
- Weight: Super-welterweight

Boxing career
- Stance: Orthodox

Boxing record
- Total fights: 19
- Wins: 17
- Win by KO: 8
- Losses: 2

Lee Cutler (born 28 December 1995) is an English professional boxer. He is a former English and WBC International Silver super-welterweight champion.

== Career ==
Cutler stopped Casey Blair in the first round of his professional debut at the O2 Academy in Bournemouth on 15 September 2018.

At the same venue, he claimed his first pro-title by taking the vacant Southern Area super-welterweight championship thanks to a second round technical knockout success over Scott James on 5 March 2022.

Cutler became English super-welterweight champion by defeating Kingsley Egbunike for the vacant title via unanimous decision at Bournemouth International Centre on 10 December 2023. Injuries and proposed fights failing to take place led him to vacate the title without making any defenses.

In his next outing, Cutler dethroned previously unbeaten WBC International Silver super-welterweight champion Stephen McKenna at the Exhibition Centre in Liverpool on 14 December 2024. He won the fight by majority decision with two of the ringside judges scoring the contest 96–92 and 95–93 respectively in his favour, while the third had it a 94–94 draw.

He made the first defense of his title against Sam Eggington at Resorts World Arena in Birmingham on 20 April 2025. At the start of the ninth round the fight was stopped on the advice of the ringside doctor due to a cut and swelling near the challenger's eye caused by an accidental clash of heads. As a result the contest went to the judges' scorecards with Eggington ruled the winner by unanimous technical decision.

After more than a year away from the competitive boxing ring, Cutler returned to face Aaron Sutton at the International Centre in Bournemouth on 6 June 2026. His opponent suffered a dislocated shoulder when he was knocked to the canvas in the third round causing the referee to halt the fight and award Cutler a technical knockout win.

Cutler faced Louis Greene as part of Zuffa Boxing 11 at the Copper Box Arena in London on 26 September 2026. He won via unanimous decision.
