= Gabriel Dossen =

Irish boxer

Personal information
- Nickname: Black Assassin
- Nationality: Irish
- Born: 29 November 1999 (age 26) Ivory Coast
- Weight: Middleweight

Boxing career
- Stance: Southpaw
Medal record
Men's amateur boxing
Representing Ireland
European Championships
Gold medal – first place	2022 Yerevan	Middleweight

Gabriel Dossen (born 29 November 1999) is an Irish amateur boxer who won a gold medal at the 2022 European Championships.

== Boxing career ==
Dossen fights out of the southpaw stance. He currently fights under the Olympic Boxing Club in Galway having formerly fought with the Furbo Boxing Club in Spiddal.

Dossen won bronze in the 2016 AIBA Youth World Boxing Championships as a light welterweight and bronze at the 2017 EUBC European Youth Championships. On 30 May 2022, he won middleweight gold at the 2022 European Amateur Boxing Championships in Yerevan, Armenia.

== Criminal conviction ==
In November 2025, Dossen was sentenced to five and a half years in prison for dealing drugs, including cocaine. He had 18 previous convictions, of which 9 were related to drugs.

== Personal life ==
Dossen was born in Ivory Coast and moved to Ireland at a young age. He currently lives in the Knocknacarra area of Galway where he works at Tesco and is a business studies student at Technological University of the Shannon: Midlands Midwest.
