= Teddy Nakimuli =

Ugandan boxer (born 2003)

Personal information
- Nationality: Ugandan
- Born: 3 March 2003 (age 23)

Boxing career
Medal record
Women's amateur boxing
Representing Uganda
Commonwealth Games
Bronze medal – third place	2022 Birmingham	Light Flyweight

Teddy Nakimuli (born 3 March 2003) is a Ugandan boxer. She participated in the 2022 Commonwealth Games in Light Flyweight winning a bronze medal.
