= Prayag Chauhan =

Indian boxer (born 1997)

Prayag chauhan
Personal information
- Nationality: Indian
- Born: 24 February 1997 (age 29) Nangli village, Delhi
- Height: 172 cm (5 ft 8 in)
- Weight: light welterweight

Boxing career
Medal record
Men's amateur boxing
Representing India
Commonwealth Youth Games
Bronze medal – third place	2015 Apia	light welterweight

Prayag Chauhan (born 24 February 1997) is an Indian amateur boxer. He won a gold medal in 2013 at the Asian junior boxing championship held in Kazakhstan and a bronze medal at the Commonwealth Youth Games 2015.

== Early life ==
Prayag Chauhan was born on 24 February 1997 in Delhi. His father Mahesh Chauhan is a Karate player and mother Preeti is a Kabaddi player. Prayag Chauhan was a gymnast before joining boxing.

== Career ==
Prayag Chauhan started his boxing career by participating in Asian championship 2013 that was held at Kazakhstan and won gold Medal. He competed in Golden Glove Vojvodina, Serbia and won gold in 2014. In 2015 he won bronze in Youth Commonwealth Games, Samoa.
