= Boxing at the 2022 Commonwealth Games – Men's middleweight =

Boxing competitions

Boxing – Men's middleweight at the 2022 Commonwealth Games
- Venue: National Exhibition Centre Hall 4
- Dates: July 29 – 7 August 2022
- Competitors: 17 from 17 nations

Medalists
| gold medal | Sam Hickey | Scotland |
| silver medal | Callum Peters | Australia |
| bronze medal | Lewis Richardson | England |
| bronze medal | Simnikiwe Bongco | South Africa |

The men's middleweight boxing competitions at the 2022 Commonwealth Games in Birmingham, England took place between July 29 and August 7 at National Exhibition Centre Hall 4. Middleweights were limited to those boxers weighing less than 75 kilograms.

Like all Commonwealth boxing events, the competition was a straight single-elimination tournament. Both semifinal losers were awarded bronze medals, so no boxers competed again after their first loss. Bouts consisted of three rounds of three minutes each, with one-minute breaks between rounds.

== Schedule ==
The schedule is as follows:

| Date | Round |
|---|---|
| Friday 29 July | Preliminaries |
| Sunday 31 July | Preliminaries |
| Wednesday 3 August | Quarter-finals |
| Saturday 6 August | Semi-finals |
| Sunday 7 August 2022 | Final |

== Results ==
The draw is as follows:

=== Finals ===
| Final |
| Sam Hickey (SCO) | 3 |
| Callum Peters (AUS) | 2 |

=== Top half ===
Preliminaries
Lewis Richardson (ENG) | 5
Haaris Khan (WAL) | 0

Preliminaries
Yusuf Nkobeza (UGA) | 1
Lewis Richardson (ENG) | 4
Jake Tucker (NIR) | 2
Billy Le Poullain (GGY) | 3
Sam Hickey (SCO) | 5
Kyghan Mortley (LCA) | 0
Abubakari Quartey (GHA) | 2
Adeyinka Benson (NGR) | 3

Quarterfinals
Lewis Richardson (ENG) | 5
Billy Le Poullain (GGY) | 0
Sam Hickey (SCO) | RSC
Adeyinka Benson (NGR)

Semifinals
Lewis Richardson (ENG)
Sam Hickey (SCO) | RSC

=== Bottom half ===
Preliminaries

Preliminaries
Emile Richardson (NZL) | 2
Desmond Amsterdam (GUY) | 3
Sumit (IND) | 0
Callum Peters (AUS) | 5
Kemrond Moses (GRN) | 5
Fiu Tui (TUV) | 0
Simnikiwe Bongco (RSA) | 5
Foday Badjie (GAM) | 0

Quarterfinals
Desmond Amsterdam (GUY)
Callum Peters (AUS) | RSC
Kemrond Moses (GRN) | 0
Simnikiwe Bongco (RSA) | 5

Semifinals
Callum Peters (AUS) | 5
Simnikiwe Bongco (RSA) | 0
