= Boxing at the 2022 Commonwealth Games – Men's light heavyweight =

Boxing competitions

Boxing – Men's light heavyweight at the 2022 Commonwealth Games
- Venue: National Exhibition Centre Hall 4
- Dates: July 29 – 7 August 2022
- Competitors: 18 from 18 nations

Medalists
gold medal	Sean Lazzerini	Scotland
silver medal	Taylor Bevan	Wales
bronze medal	Yusuf Changalawe	Tanzania
bronze medal	Aaron Bowen	England

The men's light heavyweight boxing competitions at the 2022 Commonwealth Games in Birmingham, England took place between July 29 and August 7 at National Exhibition Centre Hall 4. Light heavyweights were limited to those boxers weighing less than 80 kilograms.

Like all Commonwealth boxing events, the competition was a straight single-elimination tournament. Both semifinal losers were awarded bronze medals, so no boxers competed again after their first loss. Bouts consisted of three rounds of three minutes each, with one-minute breaks between rounds.

== Schedule ==
The schedule is as follows:

Date	Round
Friday 29 July	Preliminaries
Monday 1 August	Preliminaries
Wednesday 3 August	Quarter-finals
Saturday 6 August	Semi-finals
Sunday 7 August 2022	Final

== Results ==
The draw is as follows:

=== Finals ===
Final
Sean Lazzerini (SCO)	4
Taylor Bevan (WAL)	1

=== Top half ===
Preliminaries
Jean Rosalba (MRI)	WO
Shakul Samed (GHA)

Preliminaries
Sean Lazzerini (SCO)	RSC
Jean Rosalba (MRI)
Keven Beausejour (CAN)	5
Charles Cox (BAR)	0
Arthur Langelier (LCA)	WO
Leatialii Afoa (TUV)
Curlun Richardson (AIA)	0
Yusuf Changalawe (TAN)	5

Quarterfinals
Sean Lazzerini (SCO)	5
Keven Beausejour (CAN)	0
Arthur Langelier (LCA)
Yusuf Changalawe (TAN)	RSC

Semifinals
Sean Lazzerini (SCO)	4
Yusuf Changalawe (TAN)	1

=== Bottom half ===
Preliminaries
Taylor Bevan (WAL)	KO
Onyx Lye (NZL)

Preliminaries
Travis Tapatuetoa (NIU)	0
Ashish Kumar Chaudhary (IND)	5
Innocent Ehwarieme (NGR)	0
Aaron Bowen (ENG)	5
Billy McAllister (AUS)	2
Jerone Ennis (JAM)	3
Taylor Bevan (WAL)	RSC
Jancen Poutoa (SAM)

Quarterfinals
Ashish Kumar Chaudhary (IND)	1
Aaron Bowen (ENG)	4
Jerone Ennis (JAM)	0
Taylor Bevan (WAL)	5

Semifinals
Aaron Bowen (ENG)	0
Taylor Bevan (WAL)	5
