= Lounès Hamraoui =

French boxer

Personal information
- Nationality: France

Boxing career
Medal record
Men's amateur boxing
Representing France
European Championships
Silver medal – second place	2022 Yerevan	Light welterweight

Lounès Hamraoui is a French boxer. He competed at the 2022 European Amateur Boxing Championships, winning the bronze medal in the light welterweight event.

== Biography ==
Lounès Hamraoui won a silver medal at the 2022 European Championships in Yerevan in the super-lightweight division (-63.5 kg).
