= Harris Akbar =

English boxer

Personal information
- Born: Mohammed Harris Akbar; December 9, 1998 (age 27) Bradford, England
- Height: 6 ft 0 in (183 cm)
- Weight: Light-middleweight

Boxing career
- Stance: Orthodox

Boxing record
- Total fights: 16
- Wins: 16
- Win by KO: 14
- Losses: 0
- Draws: 0
- No contests: 0
Medal record
Men's amateur boxing
Representing England
European Championships
| Gold medal – first place | 2022 Yerevan | Light-middleweight |
Youth World Championships
| Bronze medal – third place | 2016 St. Petersburg | Welterweight |
Commonwealth Youth Games
| Gold medal – first place | 2015 Apia | Welterweight |

Mohammed Harris Akbar is an English amateur boxer who won a gold medal at the 2022 European Championships.
