= Garan Croft =

Welsh boxer (born 2001)

Personal information
- Born: 30 November 2001 (age 24) Crymych, Pembrokeshire, Wales
- Height: 180 cm (5 ft 11 in)
- Weight: Light-middleweight

Boxing career
Medal record
Men's amateur boxing
Representing Wales
European Championships
Silver medal – second place	2022 Yerevan	Light-middleweight
Commonwealth Games
Bronze medal – third place	2022 Birmingham	Light middleweight

Garan Croft (born 30 November 2001) is a Welsh amateur boxer who won a silver medal at the 2022 European Championships. His twin brother, Ioan, is also an amateur boxer. The twins come from Crymych.

Garan Croft fights at light-middleweight, whilst his brother fights in the welterweight division. The brothers took up boxing together at Cardigan ABC. The Welsh-speaking brothers were featured in an S4C television documentary prior to the Commonwealth Games 2022, for which they were both selected to represent Wales. Although they are sparring partners, they fight at different weights partly because their mother insists that they do not fight against one another in a serious bout. On the same weekend that Garan was awarded a bronze medal at the Commonwealth Games 2022, his brother Ioan won a gold medal.
