= Boxing at the 2022 Commonwealth Games – Men's featherweight =

Boxing competitions

Boxing – Men's featherweight at the 2022 Commonwealth Games
- Venue: National Exhibition Centre Hall 4
- Dates: July 30 – 7 August 2022
- Competitors: 24 from 24 nations

Medalists
| gold medal | Jude Gallagher | Northern Ireland |
| silver medal | Joseph Commey | Ghana |
| bronze medal | Mohammad Hussamuddin | India |
| bronze medal | Keoma-Ali Al-Ahmadieh | Canada |

The men's featherweight boxing competitions at the 2022 Commonwealth Games in Birmingham, England took place between July 30 and August 7 at National Exhibition Centre Hall 4. Featherweights were limited to those boxers weighing less than 57 kilograms.

Like all Commonwealth boxing events, the competition was a straight single-elimination tournament. Both semifinal losers were awarded bronze medals, so no boxers competed again after their first loss. Bouts consisted of three rounds of three minutes each, with one-minute breaks between rounds.

== Schedule ==
The schedule is as follows:

| Date | Round |
|---|---|
| Saturday 30 July | Preliminaries |
| Monday 1 August | Preliminaries |
| Wednesday 3 August | Quarter-finals |
| Saturday 6 August | Semi-finals |
| Sunday 7 August 2022 | Final |

== Results ==
The draw is as follows:

=== Finals ===
| Final |
| Joseph Commey (GHA) |
| Jude Gallagher (NIR) | WO |

=== Top half ===
Preliminaries
George Molwantwa (BOT) | 4
Jonathan Kyobe (UGA) | 1
Betero Aaree (KIR) | 0
Joseph Commey (GHA) | 5
Amzolele Dyeyi (RSA) | 0
Mohammad Hussamuddin (IND) | 5
Niven Chemben (MRI) | 2
Jone Davule (FIJ) | 3

Preliminaries
Alex Mukuka (NZL) | 3
George Molwantwa (BOT) | 2
Joseph Commey (GHA) | RSC
Allan Oaike (PNG)
Md Salim Hossain (BAN) | 0
Mohammad Hussamuddin (IND) | 5
Jone Davule (FIJ)
Tryagain Ndevelo (NAM) | RSC

Quarterfinals
Alex Mukuka (NZL) | 0
Joseph Commey (GHA) | 5
Mohammad Hussamuddin (IND) | 4
Tryagain Ndevelo (NAM) | 1

Semifinals
Joseph Commey (GHA) | 4
Mohammad Hussamuddin (IND) | 1

=== Bottom half ===
Preliminaries
Moroke Mokhotho (LES)
Ilyas Hussain (PAK) | RSC
Zweli Dlamini (SWZ) | 0
Jude Gallagher (NIR) | 5
Charlie Senior (AUS) | 5
Christon Amram (NRU) | 0
Keevin Allicock (GUY) | 5
Nicholas Okoth (KEN) | 0

Preliminaries
Anthony Joseph (TTO) | 2
Ilyas Hussain (PAK) | 3
Jude Gallagher (NIR) | RSC
Niall Farrell (ENG)
Keoma-Ali Al-Ahmadieh (CAN) | 3
Charlie Senior (AUS) | 2
Keevin Allicock (GUY) | 5
Jeewantha Nisshanka (SRI) | 0

Quarterfinals
Ilyas Hussain (PAK) | 0
Jude Gallagher (NIR) | 5
Keoma-Ali Al-Ahmadieh (CAN) | 4
Keevin Allicock (GUY) | 1

Semifinals
Jude Gallagher (NIR) | W.O.
Keoma-Ali Al-Ahmadieh (CAN)
