= Kiaran MacDonald =

English boxer

Personal information
- Born: April 30, 1997 (age 29)
- Height: 5 ft 5 in (165 cm)
- Weight: Flyweight

Boxing career
- Stance: Southpaw
Medal record
Men's amateur boxing
Representing Great Britain
European Games
Bronze medal – third place	2023 Kraków-Małopolska	Flyweight
Representing England
European Championships
Silver medal – second place	2022 Yerevan	Flyweight
Commonwealth Games
Silver medal – second place	2022 Birmingham	Flyweight

Kiaran MacDonald is an English amateur boxer. He won a silver medal at the 2022 European Championships and competed at the 2021 World Championships.

He won silver medal in Commonwealth Games 2022 at Birmingham in 51 kg flyweight category. He lost to Amit Panghal from India.
