= Abraham Mensah =

Ghanaian boxer (born 2003)

Personal information
- Born: 3 April 2003 (age 23)

Sport
- Sport: Boxing
Medal record
Men's amateur boxing
Representing Ghana
Commonwealth Games
Silver medal – second place	2022 Birmingham	Men's bantamweight

Abraham Mensah (born 3 April 2003) is a Ghanaian boxer. He represented Ghana at the 2022 Commonwealth Games.

On 4 August 2022, Commey defeated Rukmal Prasanna of Sri Lanka to progress to the semifinals and automatically guarantees Ghana its third bronze medal at the 2022 Commonwealth Games if he loses the semi-final bout.
