= Boxing at the 2022 Commonwealth Games – Men's welterweight =

Boxing competitions

Boxing – Men's welterweight at the 2022 Commonwealth Games
- Venue: National Exhibition Centre Hall 4
- Dates: July 29 – 7 August 2022
- Competitors: 17 from 17 nations

Medalists
gold medal	Ioan Croft	Wales
silver medal	Stephen Zimba	Zambia
bronze medal	Tyler Jolly	Scotland
bronze medal	Rohit Tokas	India

The men's welterweight boxing competitions at the 2022 Commonwealth Games in Birmingham, England took place between July 29 and August 7 at National Exhibition Centre Hall 4. Welterweights were limited to those boxers weighing less than 67 kilograms.

Like all Commonwealth boxing events, the competition was a straight single-elimination tournament. Both semifinal losers were awarded bronze medals, so no boxers competed again after their first loss. Bouts consisted of three rounds of three minutes each, with one-minute breaks between rounds.

== Schedule ==
The schedule is as follows:

Date	Round
Friday 29 July	Preliminaries
Tuesday 2 August	Preliminaries
Thursday 4 August	Quarter-finals
Saturday 6 August	Semi-finals
Sunday 7 August 2022	Final

== Results ==
The draw is as follows:

=== Finals ===
Final
Ioan Croft (WAL)	5
Stephen Zimba (ZAM)	0

=== Top half ===
Preliminaries
Toaua Bangke (KIR)	2
Jordy Vadamootoo (MRI)	3

Preliminaries
Ioan Croft (WAL)	5
Jordy Vadamootoo (MRI)	0
Yusufu Deen Kargbo (SLE)	1
Luwis Mbewe (MAW)	4
Neville Warupi (PNG)	4
Pemberton Lele (SOL)	1
Tyler Jolly (SCO)	KO
Daniel Hylton (JAM)

Quarterfinals
Ioan Croft (WAL)	RSC
Luwis Mbewe (MAW)
Neville Warupi (PNG)	0
Tyler Jolly (SCO)	5

Semifinals
Ioan Croft (WAL)	4
Tyler Jolly (SCO)	1

=== Bottom half ===
Preliminaries

Preliminaries
Alfred Kotey (GHA)	0
Rohit Tokas (IND)	5
Jean Marie Onana Ngah (CMR)	1
Xavier Mata'afa-Ikinofo (NIU)	4
Stephen Zimba (ZAM)	RSC-I
Eugene McKeever (NIR)
Md Hossan Ali (BAN)	0
Owen Kibira (UGA)	5

Quarterfinals
Rohit Tokas (IND)	5
Xavier Mata'afa-Ikinofo (NIU)	0
Stephen Zimba (ZAM)	5
Owen Kibira (UGA)	0

Semifinals
Rohit Tokas (IND)	2
Stephen Zimba (ZAM)	3
