= Boxing at the 2022 Commonwealth Games – Men's flyweight =

Boxing competitions

Boxing – Men's flyweight at the 2022 Commonwealth Games
- Venue: National Exhibition Centre Hall 4
- Dates: 1–7 August 2022
- Competitors: 15 from 15 nations

Medalists
gold medal	Amit Panghal	India
silver medal	Kiaran MacDonald	England
bronze medal	Patrick Chinyemba	Zambia
bronze medal	Jake Dodd	Wales

The men's flyweight boxing competitions at the 2022 Commonwealth Games in Birmingham, England took place between July 31 and August 7 at National Exhibition Centre Hall 4. Flyweights were limited to those boxers weighing between 48 and 51 kilograms.

Like all Commonwealth boxing events, the competition was a straight single-elimination tournament. Both semifinal losers were awarded bronze medals, so no boxers competed again after their first loss. Bouts consisted of three rounds of three minutes each, with one-minute breaks between rounds.

== Schedule ==
The schedule is as follows:

Date	Round
Monday 1 August	Preliminaries
Thursday 4 August	Quarter-finals
Saturday 6 August	Semi-finals
Sunday 7 August 2022	Final

== Results ==
The draw is as follows:

=== Bracket ===
Preliminaries
Patrick Chinyemba (ZAM)	RSC
Charles Keama (PNG)
Amit Panghal (IND)	5
Namri Berri (VAN)	0
Eriu Temakau (KIR)	0
Lennon Mulligan (SCO)	5
Retselisitsoe Kolobe (LES)
Jake Dodd (WAL)	RSC
Yaw Addo (GHA)	2
Clepson Paiva (NIR)	3
Kiaran MacDonald (ENG)	5
Vidanalange Bandara (SRI)	0
Otukile Mahommed (BOT)	5
Qaiyum Ariffin (MAS)	0

Quarterfinals
Alex Winwood (AUS)
Patrick Chinyemba (ZAM)	KO
Amit Panghal (IND)	5
Lennon Mulligan (SCO)	0
Jake Dodd (WAL)	RSC
Clepson Paiva (NIR)
Kiaran MacDonald (ENG)	5
Otukile Mahommed (BOT)	0

Semifinals
Patrick Chinyemba (ZAM)	0
Amit Panghal (IND)	5
Jake Dodd (WAL)
Kiaran MacDonald (ENG)	RSC

Final
Amit Panghal (IND)	5
Kiaran MacDonald (ENG)	0
