= Boxing at the 2022 Commonwealth Games – Men's bantamweight =

Boxing competitions

Boxing – Men's bantamweight at the 2022 Commonwealth Games
- Venue: National Exhibition Centre Hall 4
- Dates: August 2 – 7 August 2022
- Competitors: 11 from 11 nations

Medalists
gold medal	Dylan Eagleson	Northern Ireland
silver medal	Abraham Mensah	Ghana
bronze medal	Matthew McHale	Scotland
bronze medal	Owain Harris-Allan	Wales

The men's bantamweight boxing competitions at the 2022 Commonwealth Games in Birmingham, England took place between August 2 and August 7 at National Exhibition Centre Hall 4. Bantamweights were limited to those boxers weighing between 51 and 54 kilograms.

Like all Commonwealth boxing events, the competition was a straight single-elimination tournament. Both semifinal losers were awarded bronze medals, so no boxers competed again after their first loss. Bouts consisted of three rounds of three minutes each, with one-minute breaks between rounds.

== Schedule ==
The schedule is as follows:

Date	Round
Tuesday 2 August	Preliminaries
Thursday 4 August	Quarter-finals
Saturday 6 August	Semi-finals
Sunday 7 August 2022	Final

== Results ==
The draw is as follows:

=== Bracket ===
Preliminaries
Matthew McHale (SCO)	3
Jabali Breedy (BAR)	2
Shaffi Hassan (KEN)	2
Rukmal Prasanna (SRI)	3
Phomolo Lengola (LES)	1
Owain Harris-Allan (WAL)	4

Quarterfinals
Imdad Ahmad Shaharom (MAS)
Matthew McHale (SCO)	RSC
Armando Sigauque (MOZ)	0
Dylan Eagleson (NIR)	5
Abraham Mensah (GHA)	3
Rukmal Prasanna (SRI)	1
Owain Harris-Allan (WAL)	5
Jamie Chang (PNG)	0

Semifinals
Matthew McHale (SCO)	2
Dylan Eagleson (NIR)	3
Abraham Mensah (GHA)	3
Owain Harris-Allan (WAL)	0

Final
Dylan Eagleson (NIR)	5
Abraham Mensah (GHA)	0
