= Boxing at the 2026 Commonwealth Games – Women's 75 kg =

Boxing competitions

Boxing – Women's 75 kg at the 2026 Commonwealth Games
- Venue: SEC Centre
- Dates: 28 July – 1 August 2026
- Competitors: 5 from 5 nations

Medalists
gold medal	Emma-Sue Greentree	Australia
silver medal	Lovlina Borgohain	India
bronze medal	Mary Kate Smith	England
bronze medal	Tarona Taafaki	Tuvalu

The women's 75 kg boxing competitions at the 2026 Commonwealth Games in Glasgow, Scotland took place between July 28 and August 1 at the SEC Centre.

Like all Commonwealth boxing events, the competition was a straight single-elimination tournament. Both semifinal losers were awarded bronze medals, so no boxers competed again after their first loss. Bouts consisted of three rounds of three minutes each, with one-minute breaks between rounds.

== Schedule ==
The schedule was as follows:

Date	Round
Tuesday 28 July	Quarter-finals
Friday 31 July	Semi-finals
Saturday 1 August	Final

== Results ==
The draw was as follows:

=== Bracket ===
Quarterfinals		Semifinals		Final
		Emma-Sue Greentree (AUS)	3
Mary Kate Smith (ENG)	3	Mary Kate Smith (ENG)	2
Patricia Mbata (NGR)	2			Emma-Sue Greentree (AUS)	4
				Lovlina Borgohain (IND)	1
		Lovlina Borgohain (IND)	5
		Tarona Taafaki (TUV)	0
