= Aaron Bowen =

English boxer (born 1999)

Personal information
- Born: 10 February 1999 (age 27) Coventry, England
- Height: 6 ft 3 in (191 cm)
- Weight: Middleweight

Boxing career

Boxing record
- Total fights: 9
- Wins: 8
- Win by KO: 6
- Losses: 1
Medal record
Boxing
Representing England
Commonwealth Games
Bronze medal – third place	2022 Birmingham	Men's light heavyweight

Aaron Bowen (born 10 February 1999) is an English professional boxer. As an amateur, he has represented England at the Commonwealth Games and is a double national champion.

== Biography ==
Bowen won gold at the Commonwealth Youth Games in 2017 and made his first appearance for Great Britain in North Macedonia during 2021, winning gold again. He is a double national champion winning the light-heavyweight title in 2019 and 2021.

In 2022, he was selected for the 2022 Commonwealth Games in Birmingham where he competed in men's light heavyweight division, and won a bronze medal.

== Professional boxing record ==
9 fights	8 wins	1 loss
By knockout	6	0
Draws	0	

No.	Result	Record	Opponent	Type	Round, time	Date	Location	Notes
9	Win	8–1	Troy Coleman	TKO	9 (10), 1:41	6 Jun 2026	Sheffield Arena, Sheffield, England	
8	Loss	7–1	Tom Cowling	SD	10	29 Nov 2025	bp pulse LIVE, Birmingham, England	For vacant BBBofC Midlands Area middleweight title
7	Win	7–0	Carlos Miguel Ronner	TKO	2 (8), 2:35	13 Sep 2025	Windsor Park, Belfast, Northern Ireland	
6	Win	6–0	Mykola Vovk	TKO	4 (8), 2:22	21 Jun 2025	bp pulse LIVE, Birmingham, England	
5	Win	5–0	Juan Cruz Cacheiro	PTS	6	1 Mar 2025	SSE Arena, Belfast, Northern Ireland	
4	Win	4–0	James Todd	KO	5 (6), 1:46	30 Nov 2024	bp pulse LIVE, Birmingham, England	
3	Win	3–0	Wilmer Baron	KO	2 (6), 0:52	19 Aug 2023	Utilita Arena, Birmingham, England	
2	Win	2–0	Aljaz Venko	PTS	6	27 May 2023	Manchester Arena, Manchester, England	
1	Win	1–0	Mathieu Gomes	KO	1 (6), 1:35	18 Feb 2023	Nottingham Arena, Nottingham, England	Professional debut
