= Boxing at the 2022 Commonwealth Games – Women's light flyweight =

Boxing competitions

Boxing – Women's light flyweight at the 2022 Commonwealth Games
- Venue: National Exhibition Centre Hall 4
- Dates: July 31 – 7 August 2022
- Competitors: 10 from 10 nations

Medalists
gold medal	Nikhat Zareen	India
silver medal	Carly McNaul	Northern Ireland
bronze medal	Teddy Nakimuli	Uganda
bronze medal	Savannah Stubley	England

The Women's light flyweight boxing competitions at the 2022 Commonwealth Games in Birmingham, England took place between July 29 and August 7 at National Exhibition Centre Hall 4. Light flyweights were limited to those boxers weighing between 48 and 50 kilograms.

Like all Commonwealth boxing events, the competition was a straight single-elimination tournament. Both semifinal losers were awarded bronze medals, so no boxers competed again after their first loss. Bouts consisted of three rounds of three minutes each, with one-minute breaks between rounds.

== Schedule ==
The schedule is as follows:

Date	Round
Sunday 31 July	Preliminaries
Wednesday 3 August	Quarter-finals
Saturday 6 August	Semi-finals
Sunday 7 August 2022	Final

== Results ==
The draw is as follows:

=== Bracket ===
Preliminaries
Carly McNaul (NIR)	3
Kristy Harris (AUS)	2
Nikhat Zareen (IND)	RSC
Helena Bagão (MOZ)

Quarterfinals
Keshani Hansika (SRI)	0
Carly McNaul (NIR)	5
Teddy Nakimuli (UGA)	WO
Sara Haghighat-Joo (SLE)
Yetunde Egunjobi (NGR)	0
Savannah Stubley (ENG)	5
Nikhat Zareen (IND)	5
Helen Jones (WAL)	0

Semifinals
Carly McNaul (NIR)	5
Teddy Nakimuli (UGA)	0
Savannah Stubley (ENG)	0
Nikhat Zareen (IND)	5

Final
Carly McNaul (NIR)	0
Nikhat Zareen (IND)	5
