= Fiu Tui =

Tuvaluan boxer (born 1988)

Personal information
- Born: 11 December 1988 (age 37)

Sport
- Country: Tuvalu
- Sport: Boxing
Medal record
Men's Boxing
Representing Tuvalu
Pacific Games
| Bronze medal – third place | 2019 Apia | Middleweight |

Fiu Tui (born 11 December 1988) is a Tuvaluan boxer who has represented Tuvalu at the Commonwealth Games and Pacific Games.

Tui is a police officer. He has previously worked as a sailor. In 2009 he was one of eleven Tuvaluan sailors held hostage by Somali pirates aboard the MV Hansa Stavanger. He was released after a ransom was paid.

He won a bronze medal in the middleweight class at the 2019 Pacific Games in Apia.

In 2022 he was selected as part of Tuvalu's team for the 2022 Commonwealth Games in Birmingham, England. He used the platform of the Commonwealth games to advocate for stronger action on climate change.
