= Rohit Tokas =

Indian boxer (born 1993)

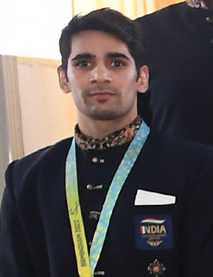
- Tokas in August 2022

Personal information
- Born: 1 August 1993 (age 32) Munirka, New Delhi
- Height: 179 cm (5 ft 10 in)
- Weight: 67 kg (148 lb)

Sport
- Sport: Boxing
- Weight class: Welterweight (63.5–67 kg)
Medal record
Boxing
Representing India
Commonwealth Games
Bronze medal – third place	2022 Birmingham	Men's welterweight

Rohit Tokas (born 1 August 1993) is an Indian boxer who competes in Welterweight category. He participated in the 2022 Commonwealth Games where he won a bronze medal in Men's welterweight category. Rohit hails from an urban village in Delhi by the name Munirka which lies in the South West District of Delhi. Rohit's father Preet Singh Tokas, was himself a wrestler.

== Coaching career ==
Tokas founded the Tokas boxing club. MMA fighter Anshul Jubli learnt boxing under him in this club. Later Jubli won the Road to UFC Season 1 tournament and got signed to Ultimate Fighting Championship, which is worlds' leading MMA promotion.
