= Owain Harris-Allan =

Welsh boxer (born 2003)

Personal information
- Nationality: Wales
- Born: 11 December 2003 (age 22)

Boxing career
Medal record
Men's amateur boxing
Representing Wales
Commonwealth Games
Bronze medal – third place	2022 Birmingham	Bantamweight
Bronze medal – third place	2026 Glasgow	60 kg

Owain Harris-Allan (born 11 December 2003) is a Welsh boxer. He competed at the 2022 Commonwealth Games, winning the bronze medal in the men's bantamweight event. He also competed at the 2026 Commonwealth Games, winning the bronze medal in the men's 60 kg event.
