= Joseph Commey =

Ghanaian boxer (born 2003)

Personal information
- Born: Joseph Nii Commey; 5 May 2003 (age 23)

Sport
- Sport: Boxing
- Weight class: Featherweight, Lightweight
Medal record
Men's amateur boxing
Representing Ghana
Commonwealth Games
Silver medal – second place	2022 Birmingham	Featherweight (-57 kg)
African Games
Gold medal – first place	2023 Accra	Lightweight (-60 kg)

Joseph Commey (born 5 May 2003) is a Ghanaian boxer. He represented Ghana at the 2022 Commonwealth Games.

On 3 August 2022, Commey defeated Alex Mukuka of Namibia to progress to the semifinals and automatically guaranteed Ghana its first bronze medal at the 2022 Commonwealth Games if he lost the semi-final bout. Commey went on to win his semi final match against India's Hassam Uddin Mohammed to make it to the finals against Jude Gallagher of Northern Ireland of which Gallagher won by a walkover due to Commey falling ill and declared unfit to box. He is a product of the Black Panthers Boxing Club in Accra headed by Ebenezer Adjei. Joseph Commey is a junior brother of John Commey, a very promising boxing star who died after short illness on Saturday August 22, 2020. Prior to the Commonwealth Games 2022 in Birmingham, Commey has never lost a fight in his amateur boxing career.
