= Dylan Eagleson =

Irish boxer

Personal information
- Born: Bangor, Northern Ireland
- Height: 5 ft 5 in (165 cm)
- Weight: Bantamweight

Boxing career
- Stance: Southpaw
Medal record
Men's amateur boxing
Representing Northern Ireland
Commonwealth Games
Gold medal – first place	2022 Birmingham	Bantamweight
Representing Ireland
European Championships
Silver medal – second place	2022 Yerevan	Bantamweight

Dylan Eagleson is an Irish amateur boxer. While representing the Republic of Ireland he won a silver medal at the 2022 European Championships, and while representing Northern Ireland he won a gold medal at the 2022 Commonwealth Games.
