= Sean Lazzerini =

Scottish boxer (born 1997)

Personal information
- Born: 13 July 1997 (age 28) Glasgow, Scotland
- Height: 5 ft 10 in (178 cm)
- Weight: Light-heavyweight

Boxing career
- Stance: Orthodox

Boxing record
- Total fights: 2
- Wins: 2
- Win by KO: 2
Medal record
Men's amateur boxing
Representing Scotland
Commonwealth Games
Gold medal – first place	2022 Birmingham	Men's light heavyweight

Sean Lazzerini (born 13 July 1997) is a Scottish professional boxer. As an amateur he won the gold medal in the men's light heavyweight category at the 2022 Commonwealth Games.

In August 2019, Lazzerini was selected to compete at the World Championships in Yekaterinburg, Russia.
