= Mozambique at the 2002 Commonwealth Games =

Sporting event delegation

Flag of Mozambique

Mozambique competed in its second Commonwealth Games in 2002. It sent six male athletes to the games and three females, competing in athletics, badminton, boxing and swimming. Maria Lurdes Mutola won the nation's only medal, a gold in the women's 800 meters, finishing over a second ahead of her nearest rival.

== Medals ==
	Gold	Silver	Bronze	Total
Mozambique	1	0	0	1

== Gold ==
Athletics:

(gold) Maria Lurdes Mutola, women's 800 meters
