= Mozambique at the 2010 Commonwealth Games =

Sporting event delegation

Flag of Mozambique

Mozambique competed in the 2010 Commonwealth Games held in Delhi, India, from 3 to 14 October 2010. It sent 10 players.

== See also ==
- 2010 Commonwealth Games
