= Jamaica at the 2022 Commonwealth Games =

- Flag of Jamaica
- CGF code: JAM
- CGA: Jamaica Olympic Association
- Website: joa.org.jm

in Birmingham, England 28 July 2022 – 8 August 2022
- Competitors: 102 (57 men and 45 women) in 16 sports
- Flag bearers (opening): Oshane Edie; Jhaniele Fowler
- Flag bearers (closing): Sydrell Williams; Zaneta Alvaranga
- Medals Ranked 12th: Gold 6 Silver 7 Bronze 2 Total 15

Commonwealth Games appearances (overview)
- 1934; 1938–1950; 1954; 1958; 1962; 1966; 1970; 1974; 1978; 1982; 1986; 1990; 1994; 1998; 2002; 2006; 2010; 2014; 2018; 2022; 2026; 2030

Jamaica competed at the 2022 Commonwealth Games at Birmingham, England from 28 July to 8 August 2022.

Rugby sevens athlete Oshane Edie and netballer Jhaniele Fowler were the flagbearers during the opening ceremony, while swimmers Sydrell Williams and Zaneta Alvaranga were the closing ceremony flagbearers.

== Medalists ==
Medal	Name	Sport	Event	Date
Gold	Elaine Thompson-Herah	Athletics	Women's 100 m	3 August
Gold	Rasheed Broadbell	Athletics	Men's 110 m hurdles	4 August
Gold	Shanieka Ricketts	Athletics	Women's triple jump	5 August
Gold	Elaine Thompson-Herah	Athletics	Women's 200 m	6 August
Gold	Janieve Russell	Athletics	Women's 400 m hurdles	6 August
Gold	Lamara Distin	Athletics	Women's high jump	6 August
Silver	Ebony Drysdale Daley	Judo	Women's -70 kg	2 August
Silver	Danniel Thomas-Dodd	Athletics	Women's shot put	3 August
Silver	Jaheel Hyde	Athletics	Men's 400 m hurdles	6 August
Silver	Shiann Salmon	Athletics	Women's 400 m hurdles	6 August
Silver	Kemba Nelson; Natalliah Whyte; Remona Burchell; Elaine Thompson-Herah; Roneisha McGregor	Athletics	Women's 4 × 100 m relay	7 August
Silver	Roneisha McGregor; Shiann Salmon; Junelle Bromfield; Natoya Goule	Athletics	Women's 4 × 400 m relay	7 August
Silver	Jamaica national netball team: Jhaniele Fowler; Shanice Beckford; Shamera Sterling; Shimona Nelson; Rebekah Robinson; Adean Thomas; Khadijah Williams; Shadian Hemmings; Latanya Wilson; Kadie-Ann Dehaney; Jodi-Ann Ward; Nicole Dixon-Rochester	Netball	Women's tournament	7 August
Bronze	Traves Smikle	Athletics	Men's discus throw	4 August
Bronze	Kimberly Williamson	Athletics	Women's high jump	6 August

== Competitors ==
The following is the list of number of competitors participating at the Games per sport/discipline.

Sport	Men	Women	Total
Athletics	22	19	41
Badminton	2	2	4
Boxing	2	0	2
Cycling	3	2	5
Diving	1	0	1
Gymnastics	1	1	2
Judo	1	2	3
Lawn bowls	2	0	2
Netball	—N/a	12	12
Rugby sevens	13	0	13
Squash	2	0	2
Swimming	4	3	7
Table tennis	1	1	2
Triathlon	1	0	1
Weightlifting	1	3	4
Wrestling	1	0	1
Total	57	45	102

== Athletics ==
Men
Track and road events

Athlete	Event	Heat		Semifinal		Final	
Athlete	Event	Result	Rank	Result	Rank	Result	Rank
Kemar Bailey-Cole	100 m	10.15	2 Q	10.25	4	Did not advance	
Conroy Jones	100 m	10.28	1 Q	10.33	5	Did not advance	
Nigel Ellis	100 m	10.41	3	Did not advance			
Jonathan Ferguson	100 m (T47)	11.67	4 q	—N/a		11.73	7
Shane Hudson	100 m (T47)	11.57 PB	4q	—N/a		11.72	6
Kadrian Goldson	200 m	21.19	2 Q	21.13	6	Did not advance	
Nathon Allen	400 m	45.18 SB	1 Q	45.99	2 Q	48.00	8
Anthony Cox	400 m	45.51	1 Q	45.98	3 q	46.17	6
Jevaughn Powell	400 m	46.14	2 Q	46.20	3	Did not advance	
Navasky Anderson	800 m	1:47.79	3 q	—N/a		1:48.75	5
Orlando Bennett	110 m hurdles	13.40	2 Q	—N/a		13.43	5
Rasheed Broadbell	110 m hurdles	13.33	1 Q	—N/a		13.08 =GR, PB	1st place, gold medalist(s)
Hansle Parchment	110 m hurdles	13.16	1 Q	—N/a		DNS	
Jaheel Hyde	400 m hurdles	49.60	1 Q	—N/a		49.78	2nd place, silver medalist(s)
Nathon Allen; Anthony Cox; Karayme Bartley; Javon Francis; Navasky Anderson	4 × 400 m relay	3:05.20	2 Q	—N/a		DSQ	

Field events

Athlete	Event	Qualification		Final	
Athlete	Event	Distance	Rank	Distance	Rank
Romaine Beckford	High jump	—N/a		2.19	8
Shawn-D Thompson	Long jump	7.85	4 q	8.05	4
Jordon Scott	Triple jump	—N/a		16.11	5
O'Dayne Richards	Shot put	—N/a		19.90	6
Traves Smikle	Discus throw	64.90	1 q	64.58	3rd place, bronze medalist(s)
Roje Stona	Discus throw	58.35	8 q	62.15	6

Women
Track and road events

Athlete	Event	Heat		Semifinal		Final	
Athlete	Event	Result	Rank	Result	Rank	Result	Rank
Natalliah Whyte	100 m	11.31	1 Q	11.17	4 q	11.32	8
Remona Burchell	100 m	11.46	2 Q	11.48	4	Did not advance	
Elaine Thompson-Herah	100 m	10.98	1 Q	11.05	1 Q	10.95	1st place, gold medalist(s)
Elaine Thompson-Herah	200 m	22.80	1 Q	22.63	1 Q	22.02 GR	1st place, gold medalist(s)
Natalliah Whyte	200 m	23.61	1 Q	23.09	2 Q	23.06	4
Roneisha McGregor	400 m	53.28	5	Did not advance			
Tiffany James	400 m	DNS		Did not advance			
Junelle Bromfield	400 m	52.04	2 Q	52.18	4 q	51.45	5
Natoya Goule	800 m	1:58.39	1 Q	—N/a		1:57.88 SB	4
Megan Tapper	100 m hurdles	12.68	1 Q	—N/a		12.67	4
Danielle Williams	100 m hurdles	12.80	2 Q	—N/a		12.69	6
Rushell Clayton	400 m hurdles	54.93	1 Q	—N/a		54.67	4
Janieve Russell	400 m hurdles	55.79	2 Q	—N/a		54.14	1st place, gold medalist(s)
Shiann Salmon	400 m hurdles	55.30	1 Q	—N/a		54.47	2nd place, silver medalist(s)
Kemba Nelson; Natalliah Whyte; Remona Burchell; Elaine Thompson-Herah; Roneisha McGregor*	4 × 100 m relay	43.66	1 Q	—N/a		43.08	3rd place, bronze medalist(s)
Roneisha McGregor; Shiann Salmon; Junelle Bromfield; Natoya Goule	4 × 400 m relay	—N/a				3:26.93	2nd place, silver medalist(s)

Field events

Athlete	Event	Qualification		Final	
Athlete	Event	Distance	Rank	Distance	Rank
Lamara Distin	High jump	1.81	11 q	1.95	1st place, gold medalist(s)
Kimberly Williamson	High jump	1.81	1 q	1.92	3rd place, bronze medalist(s)
Ackelia Smith	Long jump	6.35	11 q	6.55	6
Shanieka Ricketts	Triple jump	—N/a		14.95 GR	1st place, gold medalist(s)
Ackelia Smith	Triple jump	—N/a		13.83	6
Kimberly Williams	Triple jump	—N/a		14.25	4
Lloydricria Cameron	Shot put	16.61	8 q	17.62	4
Danniel Thomas-Dodd	Shot put	18.42	1 Q	18.98	2nd place, silver medalist(s)

== Badminton ==
A squad of four players (two per gender) was selected on 18 May 2022. Jamaica also qualified for the mixed team event (via the BWF World Rankings) as of 1 June 2022.

Singles

Athlete	Event	Round of 64	Round of 32	Round of 16	Quarterfinal	Semifinal	Final / BM	
Athlete	Event	Opposition Score	Opposition Score	Opposition Score	Opposition Score	Opposition Score	Opposition Score	Rank
Joel Angus	Men's singles	Bongout (MRI); L 0 - 2	Did not advance					
Samuel Ricketts	Men's singles	Schueler (AUS); W 2 - 0	Yang (CAN); W WO	Nibal (MDV); W 2 - 0	Teh (SGP); L 0 - 2	Did not advance		
Tahlia Richardsons	Women's singles	Bye	Siddique (PAK); W 2 - 0	Chen (AUS); L 0 - 2	Did not advance			
Katherine Wynter	Women's singles	Khan (SGP); L 0 - 2	Did not advance					

Doubles

Athlete	Event	Round of 64	Round of 32	Round of 16	Quarterfinal	Semifinal	Final / BM	
Athlete	Event	Opposition Score	Opposition Score	Opposition Score	Opposition Score	Opposition Score	Opposition Score	Rank
Samuel Ricketts; Joel Angus	Men's doubles	—N/a	Bongout / Pultoo (MRI); W 2 – 0	Tran / Yu (AUS); L 0 – 2	Did not advance			
Tahlia Richardsons; Katherine Wynter	Women's doubles	—N/a	Bye	Nantuo / Tornyenyor (GHA); W 2 – 0	Jolly / Gopichand (IND); L 0 – 2	Did not advance		
Katherine Wynter; Joel Angus	Mixed doubles	King / Williams (BAR); W 2 – 0	Hardy / Le Tissier (GGY); W 2 – 0	Hemming / Pugh (ENG); L 0 – 2	Did not advance			
Tahlia Richardsons; Samuel Ricketts	Mixed doubles	March / Harada (FLK); W 2 – 0	Yu / Ea (AUS); L 1 – 2	Did not advance				

Mixed team

Summary

Team	Event	Group stage				Quarterfinal	Semifinal	Final / BM	
Team	Event	Opposition Score	Opposition Score	Opposition Score	Rank	Opposition Score	Opposition Score	Opposition Score	Rank
Jamaica	Mixed team	South Africa; L 2 – 3	Malaysia; L 0 – 5	Zambia; W 4 – 1	3	Did not advance			

Squad

- Joel Angus
- Samuel Ricketts
- Tahlia Richardson
- Katherine Wynter

Group stage

Pos	Team	Pld	W	L	MF	MA	MD	GF	GA	GD	PF	PA	PD	Pts	Qualification
1	Malaysia	3	3	0	15	0	+15	30	0	+30	630	228	+402	3	Knockout stage
2	South Africa	3	2	1	7	8	−1	15	17	−2	509	540	−31	2	Knockout stage
3	Jamaica	3	1	2	6	9	−3	12	18	−6	457	546	−89	1	
4	Zambia	3	0	3	2	13	−11	5	27	−22	368	650	−282	0	

Source: BWF

South Africa
3
National Exhibition Centre, Court 3
29 July 2022, 09:00 UTC+1

Jamaica
2

			1	2	3
1	(South Africa) (Jamaica)	Jarred Elliot / Deidre Laurens Jordaan; Joel Angus / Katherine Wynter	21; 15	21; 15
2	(South Africa) (Jamaica)	Carden Kakora; Samuel Ricketts	14; 21	9; 21
3	(South Africa) (Jamaica)	Johanita Scholtz; Tahlia Richardson	21; 12	21; 16
4	(South Africa) (Jamaica)	Jarred Elliott / Robert Summers; Samuel Ricketts / Joel Angus	18; 21	17; 21
5	(South Africa) (Jamaica)	Deidre Laurens Jordaan / Johanita Scholtz; Tahlia Richardson / Katherine Wynter	21; 15	21; 16

Malaysia
5
National Exhibition Centre, Court 1
29 July 2022, 19:00 UTC+1

Jamaica
0

			1	2	3
1	(Malaysia) (Jamaica)	Chan Peng Soon / Cheah Yee See; Joel Angus / Katherine Wynter	21; 5	21; 12
2	(Malaysia) (Jamaica)	Ng Tze Yong; Samuel Ricketts	21; 12	21; 16
3	(Malaysia) (Jamaica)	Goh Jin Wei; Tahlia Richardson	21; 2	21; 5
4	(Malaysia) (Jamaica)	Aaron Chia / Soh Wooi Yik; Joel Angus / Samuel Ricketts	21; 7	21; 11
5	(Malaysia) (Jamaica)	Pearly Tan / Thinaah Muralitharan; Tahlia Richardson / Katherine Wynter	21; 8	21; 2

Jamaica
4
National Exhibition Centre, Court 3
30 July 2022, 14:00 UTC+1

Zambia
1

			1	2	3
1	(Jamaica) (Zambia)	Joel Angus / Katherine Wynter; Chongo Mulenga / Ogar Siamupangila	22; 24	14; 21
2	(Jamaica) (Zambia)	Samuel Ricketts; Kalombo Mulenga	21; 15	21; 16
3	(Jamaica) (Zambia)	Tahlia Richardson; Elizaberth Chipeleme	21; 6	21; 13
4	(Jamaica) (Zambia)	Joel Angus / Samuel Ricketts; Chongo Mulenga / Kalombo Mulenga	21; 17	21; 19
5	(Jamaica) (Zambia)	Tahlia Richardson / Katherine Wynter; Ogar Siamupangila / Elizaberth Chipeleme	21; 12	21; 9

== Boxing ==
Men

Athlete	Event	Round of 32	Round of 16	Quarterfinals	Semifinals	Final	
Athlete	Event	Opposition Result	Opposition Result	Opposition Result	Opposition Result	Opposition Result	Rank
Daniel Hylton	Welterweight	Bye	Jolly (SCO); L KO	Did not advance			
Jerone Ennis	Light heavyweight	Bye	McAllister (AUS); W 3 - 2	Bevan (WAL); L 0 - 5	Did not advance		

== Cycling ==
=== Road ===
Women

Athlete	Event	Time	Rank
Llori Sharpe	Road race	DNF	

=== Track ===
Sprint

Athlete	Event	Qualification		Round 1	Quarterfinals	Semifinals	Final	
Athlete	Event	Time	Rank	Opposition Time	Opposition Time	Opposition Time	Opposition Time	Rank
Zoe Boyd	Men's sprint	DNS		Did not advance				
Daniel Palmer	Men's sprint	11.128	24	Did not advance				
Malik Reid	Men's sprint	11.249	25	Did not advance				
Zoe Boyd; Malik Reid; Daniel Palmer	Men's team sprint	49.845	7	—N/a			Did not advance	
Dahlia Palmer	Women's sprint	11.678	21	Did not advance				

Keirin

Athlete	Event	1st Round	Repechage	Semifinals	Final
Athlete	Event	Rank	Rank	Rank	Rank
Zoe Boyd	Men's keirin	DNS	Did not advance		
Daniel Palmer	Men's keirin	6 R	4	Did not advance	
Malik Reid	Men's keirin	6 R	3	Did not advance	
Dahlia Palmer	Women's keirin	4 R	2	Did not advance	

Time trial

Athlete	Event	Time	Rank
Zoe Boyd	Men's time trial	1:13.681	19
Daniel Palmer	Men's time trial	1:11.307	17
Malik Reid	Men's time trial	1:11.944	18

== Diving ==
One diver (Yona Knight-Wisdom) was selected.

Athlete	Events	Semifinal		Final	
Athlete	Events	Points	Rank	Points	Rank
Yona Knight-Wisdom	Men's 1 m springboard	383.60	5 Q	383.10	5
Yona Knight-Wisdom	Men's 3 m springboard	446.85	2 Q	445.50	6

== Gymnastics ==
=== Artistic ===
Men
Individual Qualification

Athlete	Event	Apparatus						Total	Rank
Athlete	Event	F	PH	R	V	PB	HB	Total	Rank
Michael Reid	Qualification	—N/a	11.050	—N/a		13.350	—N/a		

Women
Individual Qualification

Athlete	Event	Apparatus				Total	Rank
Athlete	Event	V	UB	BB	F	Total	Rank
Danyella Richards	Qualification	12.300	9.900	10.250	11.150	43.600	24

== Judo ==
Athlete	Event	Round of 16	Quarterfinals	Semifinals	Repechage	Final/BM	
Athlete	Event	Opposition Result	Opposition Result	Opposition Result	Opposition Result	Opposition Result	Rank
Steven Moore	Men's +100 kg	Dugasse (SEY); L 0 - 10	Did not advance				
Lauren Semple	Women's -63 kg	—N/a	Etoua Biock (CMR); L 00 - 11	Did not advance	Rahming (BAH); W 10 - 00	Haecker (AUS); L 00 - 10	5
Ebony Drysdale Daley	Women's -70 kg	—N/a	Hawkes (NIR); W 10 - 00	P-Pollard (ENG); W 10 - 00	—N/a	Coughlan (AUS); L 00 - 10	2nd place, silver medalist(s)

== Lawn bowls ==
Athlete	Event	Group stage					Quarterfinal	Semifinal	Final / BM	
Athlete	Event	Opposition Score	Opposition Score	Opposition Score	Opposition Score	Rank	Opposition Score	Opposition Score	Opposition Score	Rank
Robert Simpson	Men's Singles	Abd Muin (MAS); L 4 - 21	Olivier (NAM); L 9 - 21	Walker (ENG); L 8 - 21	Naiseruvati (FIJ); L 4 - 21	5	Did not advance			
Robert Simpson; Mervyn Edwards	Men's Pairs	Norfolk Island; W 17 - 16	Namibia; L 4 - 33	Wales; L 8 - 33	Northern Ireland; L 7 - 26	5	Did not advance			

== Netball ==
Jamaica qualified for the netball at the 2022 Commonwealth Games via the World Netball Rankings. With a team coached by Connie Francis and captained by Jhaniele Fowler, Jamaica finished the tournament as silver medallists. Jamaica defeated Australia 57–55 during the pool stages and topped the pool. In the semi-finals they defeated New Zealand 67–51 and, as a result, qualified for their first major final. However, in the final, they lost 55–51 to Australia.

Roster

2022 Commonwealth Games roster
Players
Coaches

Name	Pos	DOB	Height	Club	Nat	Caps
Jhaniele Fowler (c)	GS	21 July 1989 (aged 33)	1.98 m (6 ft 6 in)	West Coast Fever	(Australia)
Shimona Nelson	GS	1 December 1998 (aged 23)	1.95 m (6 ft 5 in)	Melbourne Mavericks	(Australia)
Shanice Beckford	GA, WA	16 April 1995 (aged 27)	1.70 m (5 ft 7 in)	West Coast Fever	(Australia)
Rebekah Robinson	GA	23 January 1995 (aged 27)	1.78 m (5 ft 10 in)		(Jamaica)
Khadijah Williams	WA, C	29 December 1994 (aged 27)	1.68 m (5 ft 6 in)		(Jamaica)
Nicole Dixon-Rochester	C, WA	3 February 1995 (aged 27)	1.65 m (5 ft 5 in)		(Jamaica)
Adean Thomas	C, WA, WD	31 July 1994 (aged 27)	1.73 m (5 ft 8 in)		(Jamaica)
Shadian Hemmings	WD, C, WA	9 November 1990 (aged 31)	–		(Jamaica)
Jodi-Ann Ward	WD, GD	1 September 1994 (aged 27)	1.78 m (5 ft 10 in)	Giants Netball	(Australia)
Latanya Wilson	GD, WD	10 November 2000 (aged 21)	1.88 m (6 ft 2 in)	Adelaide Thunderbirds	(Australia)
Shamera Sterling	GK, GD	21 October 1995 (aged 26)	1.85 m (6 ft 1 in)	Adelaide Thunderbirds	(Australia)
Kadie-Ann Dehaney	GK, GD	4 September 1996 (aged 25)	1.92 m (6 ft 4 in)	West Coast Fever	(Australia)

Head coach

- Connie Francis

Assistant coach

- Shawn Murdock
  Specialist Coach:
  Rob Wright

Notes

- (c) – Captain
- (cc) – Co-captain
- (vc) – Vice-captain
- – Injury / maternity leave
- (TRP) – Temporary Replacement Player

Pool A

Pos	Team	Pld	W	D	L	GF	GA	GD	Pts	Qualification
1	Jamaica	5	5	0	0	378	205	+173	10	Semi-finals
2	Australia	5	4	0	1	386	187	+199	8	Semi-finals
3	South Africa	5	3	0	2	323	275	+48	6	Classification matches
4	Wales	5	2	0	3	235	306	−71	4	Classification matches
5	Scotland	5	1	0	4	224	302	−78	2	Classification matches
6	Barbados	5	0	0	5	150	421	−271	0	Classification matches

Source: Birmingham 2022

29 July 2022; 18:00	Report	Jamaica	72–43	Wales	National Exhibition Centre; Umpires: Louise Travis; Ken Metekingi
29 July 2022; 18:00	Report	Beckford 8/12 (67%); Fowler 32/33 (97%); Nelson 29/29 (100%); Robison 3/5 (60%)		Creak 22/27 (81%); Roberts 3/5 (60%); Rowe 18/19 (95%)	National Exhibition Centre; Umpires: Louise Travis; Ken Metekingi

30 July 2022; 18:00	Report	Jamaica	68–49	South Africa	National Exhibition Centre; Umpires: Angela Armstrong-Lush; Joshua Bowring
30 July 2022; 18:00	Report	Beckford 15/18 (83%); Fowler 33/33 (100%); Nelson 14/14 (100%); Robison 6/6 (100%)		Rademan 6/8 (75%) van der Berg 13/15 (87%); Venter 30/36 (83%)	National Exhibition Centre; Umpires: Angela Armstrong-Lush; Joshua Bowring

1 August 2022; 14:00	Report	Jamaica	103–24	Barbados	National Exhibition Centre; Umpires: Elizna Van Den Berg; Anso Kemp
1 August 2022; 14:00	Report	Beckford 12/13 (92%); Fowler 24/27 (89%); Nelson 58/60 (97%); Robison 9/9 (100%)		Agard 10/12 (83%); Blackman 3/3 (100%); Holder 1/3 (33%); Wharton 10/15 (67%)	National Exhibition Centre; Umpires: Elizna Van Den Berg; Anso Kemp

2 August 2022; 14:00	Report	Jamaica	78–34	Scotland	National Exhibition Centre; Umpires: Joshua Bowring; Alison Harrison
2 August 2022; 14:00	Report	Beckford 5/6 (83%); Fowler 37/37 (100%); Nelson 33/35 (94%); Robison 3/6 (50%)		Barrie 12/17 (71%); Goodwin 18/19 (95%); McCall 4/8 (50%)	National Exhibition Centre; Umpires: Joshua Bowring; Alison Harrison

4 August 2022; 09:00	Report	Australia	55–57	Jamaica	National Exhibition Centre; Umpires: Gareth Fowler; Angela Armstrong-Lush
4 August 2022; 09:00	Report	Bueta 36/39 (92%); Wood 19/22 (86%)		Beckford 10/10 (100%); Fowler 47/50 (94%)	National Exhibition Centre; Umpires: Gareth Fowler; Angela Armstrong-Lush

Semi-finals

6 August 2022; 09:00	Report	Jamaica	67–51	New Zealand	National Exhibition Centre; Umpires: Joshua Bowring; Bronwen Adams
6 August 2022; 09:00	Report	Beckford 10/10 (100%); Fowler 54/54 (100%); Nelson 3/3 (100%)		Nweke 24/24 (100%); Selby-Rickit 14/16 (88%); Wilson 13/15 (87%)	National Exhibition Centre; Umpires: Joshua Bowring; Bronwen Adams

Final

7 August 2022; 20:30	Report	Jamaica	51–55	Australia	National Exhibition Centre; Umpires: Gareth Fowler; Angela Armstrong-Lush
7 August 2022; 20:30	Report	Scoring by quarter: 12–14, 17–15, 10–16, 12–10			National Exhibition Centre; Umpires: Gareth Fowler; Angela Armstrong-Lush
7 August 2022; 20:30	Report	Beckford 5/5 (100%); Fowler 46/47 (98%)		Bueta 37/37 (100%); Koenen 15/15 (100%); Wood 3/5 (60%)	National Exhibition Centre; Umpires: Gareth Fowler; Angela Armstrong-Lush

== Rugby sevens ==
As of 24 April 2022, Jamaica qualified for the men's tournament. This was achieved through their position in the 2022 RAN Sevens Qualifiers.

Summary

team	Event	Preliminary round				Quarterfinal / CQ	Semifinal / CS	Final / BM / PF	
team	Event	Opposition Result	Opposition Result	Opposition Result	Rank	Opposition Result	Opposition Result	Opposition Result	Rank
Jamaica men	Men's tournament	Australia; L 0 - 62	Kenya; L 0 - 45	Uganda; L 0 - 40	4	England; L 7 - 45	Malaysia; W 28 - 7	Sri Lanka; W 26 - 24	13

=== Men's tournament ===
Roster

- Tyler Bush
- Ronaldeni Fraser
- Rhodri Adamson
- Oshane Edie
- Michael St. Claire
- Mason Caton-Brown
- Lucas Roy-Smith
- Gareth Stoppani
- Fabion Turner
- Dy'neal Fessal
- Conan Osborne
- Ashley Smith
- Omar Dixon

Pool D

Pos	Team	Pld	W	D	L	PF	PA	PD	Pts	Qualification
1	Australia	3	2	1	0	81	17	+64	8	Advance to Quarter-finals
2	Kenya	3	2	0	1	77	21	+56	7	Advance to Quarter-finals
3	Uganda	3	1	1	1	66	39	+27	6	Advance to classification Quarter-finals
4	Jamaica	3	0	0	3	0	147	−147	3	Advance to classification Quarter-finals

Updated to match(es) played on 29 July 2022. Source: Birmingham2022
Rules for classification: 1) Points; 2) Head-to-head result; 3) Point difference; 4) Points scored.

29 July 2022
10:28

Australia	62–0	Jamaica
Try: Kerevi (3) 1' m, 5' c, 6' c Lawson (2) 2' c, 12' c Toole 4' c Roache 9' m Malouf 10' c Longbottom 11' m Nawaqanitawase 14' m Con: Dowling (4/5) 2', 4', 6', 7'; Roache (2/5) 10', 12'	Report

Coventry Stadium, Coventry
Referee: Nick Hogan (New Zealand)

29 July 2022
18:58

Kenya	45–0	Jamaica
Try: Oyoo 1' m Onyala 2' c Taabu 6' c Ambaka 7' m Wekesa 9' c Mwale 11' c Otieno 14' c Con: Taabu (2/4) 3', 6'; Olindi (1/1) 9'; Amunga (2/2) 11', 14'	Report

Coventry Stadium, Coventry
Referee: Tevita Rokovereni (Fiji)

30 July 2022
10:28

Uganda	40–0	Jamaica
Try: Kasito 1' c Munyani 4' c Ofoyrowth (2) 6' m, 9' c Wokorach 8' c Nkore 12' c Con: Wokorach (5/6) 1', 5', 8', 9', 13'	Report

Coventry Stadium, Coventry
Referee: Jordan Way (Australia)

Classification Quarterfinals

30 July 2022
18:14

England	45–7	Jamaica
Try: Bowen (2) 1' m, 4' m Emery 6' c Roddick 7' c Hyde 8' c Bavadra 10' c Homer 12' c Con: Emery (4/6) 6', 7', 8', 11'; Homer (1/1) 12'	Report	Try: Bush 8' c Con: Adamson (1/1) 10'

Coventry Stadium, Coventry
Referee: Jordan Way (Australia)

13th-16th Semifinals

31 July 2022
10:30

Jamaica	28–7	Malaysia
Try: Bush 4' c Turner 9' c Caton-Brown (2) 9' c, 13' c Con: Stoppani (2/2) 4', 9'; Adamson (1/1) 10'; Roy-Smith (1/1) 13' c Cards: Adamson (red card) 11'	Report	Try: Nasarrudin 8' c Con: Mat Zizi (1/1) 8'

Coventry Stadium, Coventry
Referee: Finlay Brown (Scotland)

13th place match

31 July 2022
18:44

Jamaica	26–24	Sri Lanka
Try: Caton-Brown (2) 1' c, 8' c Smith 6' m Edie 10' c Con: Roy-Smith (3/4) 1', 8', 11'	Report	Try: N. Ratwatte 3' c Hettiarachchi 7' m Kudachchige 9' c Hapugoda 14' c Con: Hapugoda (1/2) 4'; N. Ratwatte (2/2) 9', 14'

Coventry Stadium, Coventry
Referee: Finlay Brown (Scotland)

== Squash ==
Athlete	Event	Round of 64	Round of 32	Round of 16	Quarterfinals	Semifinals	Final	
Athlete	Event	Opposition Score	Opposition Score	Opposition Score	Opposition Score	Opposition Score	Opposition Score	Rank
Christopher Binnie	Men's singles	Evans Ayih (GHA); W 3 - 0	Ramit Tandon (IND); W 3 - 0	Adrian Waller (ENG); L 0 - 3	Did not advance			
Julian Morrison	Men's singles	Nasir Iqbal (PAK); L 0 - 3	Did not advance					

== Swimming ==
Seven swimmers (four men, three women) were selected.

Men

Athlete	Event	Heat		Semifinal		Final	
Athlete	Event	Time	Rank	Time	Rank	Time	Rank
Nathaniel Thomas	50 m freestyle	23.89	27	Did not advance			
Sidrell Williams	50 m freestyle	23.94	28	Did not advance			
Nathaniel Thomas	100 m freestyle	52.64	35	Did not advance			
Sidrell Williams	100 m freestyle	53.54	44	Did not advance			
Nathaniel Thomas	50 m backstroke	27.60	28	Did not advance			
Keanan Dols	100 m backstroke	57.80	22	Did not advance			
Nathaniel Thomas	100 m backstroke	1:00.27	28	Did not advance			
Kito Campbell	50 m breaststroke	28.87	22	Did not advance			
Kito Campbell	100 m breaststroke	1:05.04	26	Did not advance			
Kito Campbell	200 m breaststroke	2:29.95	17	—N/a		Did not advance	
Sidrell Williams	50 m butterfly	25.32	27	Did not advance			
Keanan Dols	100 m butterfly	Did not start		Did not advance			
Sidrell Williams	100 m butterfly	56.84	30	Did not advance			
Keanan Dols	200 m butterfly	2:01.75	13	—N/a		Did not advance	
Keanan Dols	200 m individual medley	Did not start		—N/a		Did not advance	

Women

Athlete	Event	Heat		Semifinal		Final	
Athlete	Event	Time	Rank	Time	Rank	Time	Rank
Zaneta Alvaranga	50 m freestyle	26.49	18	Did not advance			
Kelsie Campbell	50 m freestyle	27.03	24	Did not advance			
Mackenzie Headley	50 m freestyle	25.95	15 Q	25.97	16	Did not advance	
Zaneta Alvaranga	100 m freestyle	58.80	28	Did not advance			
Mackenzie Headley	100 m freestyle	57.37	21	Did not advance			
Mackenzie Headley	50 m breaststroke	33.85	19	Did not advance			
Mackenzie Headley	100 m breaststroke	Did not start		Did not advance			
Zaneta Alvaranga	50 m butterfly	27.89	21	Did not advance			
Kelsie Campbell	50 m butterfly	Did not start		Did not advance			
Mackenzie Headley	50 m butterfly	28.12	24	Did not advance			
Kelsie Campbell	100 m butterfly	1:04.32	27	Did not advance			
Zaneta Alvaranga	100 m butterfly	1:03.02	26	Did not advance			

== Table tennis ==
Three players (two men, one woman) qualified for the competitions.

Singles

Athletes	Event	Group stage			Round of 32	Round of 16	Quarterfinal	Semifinal	Final / BM	
Athletes	Event	Opposition Score	Opposition Score	Rank	Opposition Score	Opposition Score	Opposition Score	Opposition Score	Opposition Score	Rank
Kane Watson	Men's singles	Calderon (LCA); L 2 - 4	Leong (MAS); L 0 - 4	3	Did not advance					
Solesha Young	Women's singles	Patel (RSA); L 0 - 4	Amadi (KEN); W 4 - 1	2	Did not advance					

Doubles

Athletes	Event	Round of 64	Round of 32	Round of 16	Quarterfinal	Semifinal	Final / BM	
Athletes	Event	Opposition Score	Opposition Score	Opposition Score	Opposition Score	Opposition Score	Opposition Score	Rank
Solesha Young; Kane Watson	Mixed doubles	Abrefa / Kwabi (GHA); L 1 - 3	Did not advance					

== Triathlon ==
Individual

Athlete	Event	Swim (750 m)	Trans 1	Bike (20 km)	Trans 2	Run (5 km)	Total	Rank
Phillip McCatty	Men's	12:35	01:12	32:53:00	00:25	19:38	01:06:43	37

== Weightlifting ==
Four weightlifters (one man, three women) were selected. Sientje Henderson qualified via the IWF Commonwealth Ranking List, whereas the other three were awarded Bipartite Invitations.

Athlete	Event	Snatch		Clean & jerk		Total	Rank
Athlete	Event	Result	Rank	Result	Rank	Total	Rank
Omarie Mears	Men's -81 kg	126	10	147	11	273	11
Sky Norris	Women's -55 kg	78	5	92	6	170	6
Chloe Whylie	Women's -76 kg	81	10	95	8	176	8
Sientje Henderson	Women's -87 kg	73	10	90	10	163	10

== Wrestling ==
Key:

- VT - Victory by Fall.
- PP - Decision by Points - the loser with technical points.
- PO - Decision by Points - the loser without technical points.

Athlete	Event	Round of 16	Quarterfinal	Semifinal	Repechage	Final / BM	
Athlete	Event	Opposition Result	Opposition Result	Opposition Result	Opposition Result	Opposition Result	Rank
Aaron Johnson	Men's -125 kg	Biswas (BAN); W 11 - 0	Dhesi (CAN); L 0 - 10	Did not advance	Bye	Grewal (IND); L 0 - 6	5

== See also ==
- Jamaica at the 2022 Winter Olympics
