= South Africa at the 2022 Commonwealth Games =

- Flag of South Africa
- CG code: RSA
- CGA: South African Sports Confederation and Olympic Committee
- Website: teamsa.co.za

in Birmingham, England 28 July 2022 – 8 August 2022
- Competitors: 217 (96 men and 121 women) in 18 sports
- Flag bearers (opening): Christian Sadie; Bongiwe Msomi
- Flag bearer (closing): Jovan van Vuuren
- Medals Ranked 9th: Gold 7 Silver 9 Bronze 11 Total 27

Commonwealth Games appearances (overview)
- 1930; 1934; 1938; 1950; 1954; 1958; 1962–1990; 1994; 1998; 2002; 2006; 2010; 2014; 2018; 2022; 2026; 2030

South Africa competed at the 2022 Commonwealth Games in Birmingham, England from 28 July to 8 August 2022. It was South Africa's 14th appearance at the Commonwealth Games.

Para-swimmer Christian Sadie and netballer Bongiwe Msomi were the country's flagbearers during the opening ceremony.

Durban initially secured the hosting rights after Edmonton withdrew from the bidding contest, which would have led to the Games being hosted on African soil for the first time. However, the South African government subsequently claimed it would not be possible to host the Games because of financial constraints; as a result, the CGF stripped Durban of their hosting rights in March 2017.

== Medalists ==
Medal	Name	Sport	Event	Date
1st place, gold medalist(s)	Lara van Niekerk	Swimming	Women's 50 metre breaststroke	30 July 2022
1st place, gold medalist(s)	Pieter Coetze	Swimming	Men's 100 metre backstroke	30 July 2022
1st place, gold medalist(s)	Tatjana Schoenmaker	Swimming	Women's 200 metre breaststroke	31 July 2022
1st place, gold medalist(s)	South Africa national rugby sevens team: Sako Makata; Impi Visser; Zain Davids; Angelo Davids; JC Pretorius; Selvyn Davids; Ronald Brown; Dewald Human; Siviwe Soyizwapi; Muller du Plessis; Mfundo Ndhlovu; Christie Grobbelaar; Shaun Williams	Rugby sevens	Men's tournament	31 July 2022
1st place, gold medalist(s)	Michaela Whitebooi	Judo	Women's 48 kg	1 August 2022
1st place, gold medalist(s)	Lara van Niekerk	Swimming	Women's 100 metre breaststroke	2 August 2022
1st place, gold medalist(s)	Ndodomzi Ntutu	Athletics	Men's 100 metres (T12)	4 August 2022
2nd place, silver medalist(s)	Chad le Clos	Swimming	Men's 200 metre butterfly	31 July 2022
2nd place, silver medalist(s)	Pieter Coetze	Swimming	Men's 50 metre backstroke	1 August 2022
2nd place, silver medalist(s)	Erin Gallagher	Swimming	Women's 50 metre butterfly	1 August 2022
2nd place, silver medalist(s)	Johanna Snyman; Esme Kruger; Bridget Calitz; Thabelo Muvhango	Lawn bowls	Women's fours	2 August 2022
2nd place, silver medalist(s)	Tatjana Schoenmaker	Swimming	Women's 100 metre breaststroke	2 August 2022
2nd place, silver medalist(s)	Akani Simbine	Athletics	Men's 100 metres	3 August 2022
2nd place, silver medalist(s)	Charl du Toit	Athletics	Men's 100 metres (T38)	3 August 2022
2nd place, silver medalist(s)	Nicolaas de Lange	Wrestling	Men's -97 kg	7 August 2022
2nd place, silver medalist(s)	Daryl Impey	Cycling	Men's road race	7 August 2022
3rd place, bronze medalist(s)	Kaylene Corbett	Swimming	Women's 200 metre breaststroke	31 July 2022
3rd place, bronze medalist(s)	Caitlin Rooskrantz	Gymnastics	Uneven bars	1 August 2022
3rd place, bronze medalist(s)	Charne Griesel	Judo	Women's -52 kg	1 August 2022
3rd place, bronze medalist(s)	Christian Sadie	Swimming	Men's 50 metre freestyle S7	1 August 2022
3rd place, bronze medalist(s)	Pieter Coetze	Swimming	Men's 200 metre backstroke	2 August 2022
3rd place, bronze medalist(s)	Candice Lill	Cycling	Women's cross-country	3 August 2022
3rd place, bronze medalist(s)	Desiree Levin; Victoria van der Merwe	Lawn bowls	Women's pairs B6-8	3 August 2022
3rd place, bronze medalist(s)	Jovan van Vuuren	Athletics	Men's long jump	4 August 2022
3rd place, bronze medalist(s)	Phiwokuhle Mnguni	Boxing	Women's 57kg	6 August 2022
3rd place, bronze medalist(s)	Simnikiwe Bongco	Boxing	Men's 75kg	6 August 2022
3rd place, bronze medalist(s)	Zenéy van der Walt	Athletics	Women's 400m hurdles	7 August 2022

Medals by sport
Sport	1st place, gold medalist(s)	2nd place, silver medalist(s)	3rd place, bronze medalist(s)	Total
Athletics	1	2	2	5
Boxing	0	0	2	2
Cycling	0	1	1	2
Gymnastics	0	0	1	1
Judo	1	0	1	2
Lawn bowls	0	1	1	2
Rugby sevens	1	0	0	1
Swimming	4	4	3	11
Wrestling	0	1	0	1
Total	7	9	11	27

Medals by date
Day	Date	1st place, gold medalist(s)	2nd place, silver medalist(s)	3rd place, bronze medalist(s)	Total
1	30 July	2	0	0	2
2	31 July	2	1	1	4
3	1 August	1	2	3	6
4	2 August	1	2	1	4
5	3 August	0	2	2	4
6	4 August	1	0	1	2
7	5 August	0	0	0	0
8	6 August	0	0	2	2
9	7 August	0	2	1	3
10	8 August	0	0	0	0
Total		7	9	11	27

Medals by gender
Gender	1st place, gold medalist(s)	2nd place, silver medalist(s)	3rd place, bronze medalist(s)	Total
Female	4	3	7	14
Male	3	6	4	13
Mixed	0	0	0	0
Total	7	9	11	27

== Competitors ==
The following is the list of number of competitors participating at the Games per sport/discipline.

Sport	Men	Women	Total
Athletics	14	13	27
Badminton	3	2	5
3x3 basketball	4	4	8
Beach volleyball	2	0	2
Boxing	2	1	3
Cricket	—N/a	15	15
Cycling	5	4	9
Gymnastics	1	6	7
Hockey	18	18	36
Judo	1	3	4
Lawn bowls	8	8	16 (Note: Plus two directors)
Netball	—N/a	12	12
Rugby sevens	13	13	26
Swimming	9	13	22
Table tennis	4	4	8
Triathlon	5	4	9 (Note: Plus three guides)
Weightlifting	3	1	4
Wrestling	4	0	4
Total	96	121	217

== Athletics ==
Having qualified through the World Para Athletics World Rankings (for performances registered between 31 December 2020 and 25 April 2022), seven para athletes were selected as of 8 June 2022.

Another two para athletes and twenty-six athletes were added to the squad on 4 July 2022. Luxolo Adams and Shaun Maswanganyi pulled out of the squad after suffering injuries in the World Athletics Championships. Sprinters Clarence Munyai and Emile Erasmus, pole vaulter Kyle Rademeyer and 400m runner Zakhiti Nene had to withdraw due to displaying COVID-19 symptoms. Some athletes also couldn't make it due to transportation errors.

Men
Track and road events

Athlete	Event	Heat		Semifinal		Final	
Athlete	Event	Result	Rank	Result	Rank	Result	Rank
Akani Simbine	100 m	10.10	1 Q	10.07	1 Q	10.13	2nd place, silver medalist(s)
Jonathan Ntutu	100 m (T12)	10.89	1 Q	—N/a		10.83	1st place, gold medalist(s)
Jaco Smit	100 m (T12)	11.32	2	—N/a		did not advance	
Charl du Toit	100 m (T38)	—N/a				11.54	2nd place, silver medalist(s)
Zakithi Nene	400 m	DNS		did not advance			
Tshepo Tshite	800 m	1:49.82	4	—N/a		did not advance	
Ryan Mphahlele	1500 m	3:42.92	7 q	—N/a		3:34.66	11
Adriaan Wildschutt	10,000 m	—N/a				27:41.04	5
Tiaan Bosch	Marathon (T54)	—N/a				2:05:57	8

Field events

Athlete	Event	Qualification		Final	
Athlete	Event	Distance	Rank	Distance	Rank
Jovan van Vuuren	Long jump	7.87	3 q	8.06	3rd place, bronze medalist(s)
Cheswill Johnson	Long jump	DNS		did not advance	
Kyle Blignaut	Shot put	—N/a		19.23	7
Allan Cumming	Hammer throw	—N/a		63.17	13
Tshepang Makhethe	Hammer throw	—N/a		68.76	7

Women
Track and road events

Athlete	Event	Heat		Final	
Athlete	Event	Result	Rank	Result	Rank
Sheryl James	100 m T38	13.53	4 q	13.68	7
Liezel Gouws	100 m T38	14.57	6	did not advance	
Prudence Sekgodiso	800 m	2:00.170	3	did not advance	
Dominique Scott-Efurd	5000 m	—N/a		15:07.50	5
Dominique Scott-Efurd	10,000 m	—N/a		31:25.18	7
Marione Fourie	100 m hurdles	13.04	3	did not advance	
Zenéy van der Walt	400 m hurdles	55.10	2 Q	54.47	3rd place, bronze medalist(s)
Miranda Coetzee; Taylon Bieldt; Shirley Nekhubui; Zenéy van der Walt	4 × 400 m relay	—N/a		3:30.25	4

Field events

Athlete	Event	Final	
Athlete	Event	Distance	Rank
Yolandi Stander	Discus throw	55.49	6
Mandilene Hoffmann	Discus throw F44/64	29.93	4
Yane van der Merwe	Discus throw F44/64	28.82	5
Jo-Ane van Dyk	Javelin throw	57.12	6

== Badminton ==
As of 1 June 2022, South Africa qualified for the mixed team event via the BWF World Rankings. A squad of five players was confirmed on 4 July 2022.

Singles

Athlete	Event	Round of 64	Round of 32	Round of 16	Quarterfinal	Semifinal	Final / BM	
Athlete	Event	Opposition Score	Opposition Score	Opposition Score	Opposition Score	Opposition Score	Opposition Score	Rank
Caden Kakora	Men's singles	Chater (FLK); W (21–10, 21–8)	Paul (MRI); L (6–21, 21–18, 3–21)	did not advance				
Robert Summers	Men's singles	Bye	Loh (SGP); L (16–21, 9–21)	did not advance				
Deidre Laurens Jordaan	Women's singles	Naluwooza (UGA); W (21–10, 21–8)	March (FLK); W (21–12, 21–1)	Darragh (NIR); L (13–21, 5–21)	did not advance			
Johanita Scholtz	Women's singles	Redfearn (ENG); L (11–21, 12–21)	did not advance					

Doubles

Athlete	Event	Round of 64	Round of 32	Round of 16	Quarterfinal	Semifinal	Final / BM	
Athlete	Event	Opposition Score	Opposition Score	Opposition Score	Opposition Score	Opposition Score	Opposition Score	Rank
Jarred Elliott; Robert Summers	Men's doubles	—N/a	Ali & Bhatti (PAK); L (19–21, 17–21)	did not advance				
Deidre Laurens Jordaan; Johanita Scholtz	Women's doubles	—N/a	Christodoulou & Kattirtzi (CYP); W (21–15, 21–14)	Tan & Thinaah (MAS); L (6–21, 4–21)	did not advance			
Jarred Elliott; Deidre Laurens Jordaan	Mixed doubles	Bye	Grimley & Donnell (SCO); L (8–21, 10–21)	did not advance				
Robert Summers; Johanita Scholtz	Mixed doubles	Bye	Lubah & Bodha (MRI); W (21–8, 21–14)	Dias & Hendahewa (SRI); L (18–21, 8–21)	did not advance			

Mixed team

Summary

Team	Event	Group stage				Quarterfinal	Semifinal	Final / BM	
Team	Event	Opposition Score	Opposition Score	Opposition Score	Rank	Opposition Score	Opposition Score	Opposition Score	Rank
South Africa	Mixed team	Jamaica; W 3–2	Zambia; W 4–1	Malaysia; L 0–5	2 Q	India; L 0–3	did not advance		

Squad

- Johanita Scholtz
- Jarred Elliott
- Robert Summers
- Deidre Laurens Jordaan
- Caden Kakora

Group stage

Pos	Team	Pld	W	L	MF	MA	MD	GF	GA	GD	PF	PA	PD	Pts	Qualification
1	Malaysia	3	3	0	15	0	+15	30	0	+30	630	228	+402	3	Knockout stage
2	South Africa	3	2	1	7	8	−1	15	17	−2	509	540	−31	2	Knockout stage
3	Jamaica	3	1	2	6	9	−3	12	18	−6	457	546	−89	1	
4	Zambia	3	0	3	2	13	−11	5	27	−22	368	650	−282	0	

Source: BWF

South Africa
3
National Exhibition Centre, Court 3
29 July 2022, 09:00 UTC+1

Jamaica
2

			1	2	3
1	(South Africa) (Jamaica)	Jarred Elliot / Deidre Laurens Jordaan; Joel Angus / Katherine Wynter	21; 15	21; 15
2	(South Africa) (Jamaica)	Carden Kakora; Samuel Ricketts	14; 21	9; 21
3	(South Africa) (Jamaica)	Johanita Scholtz; Tahlia Richardson	21; 12	21; 16
4	(South Africa) (Jamaica)	Jarred Elliott / Robert Summers; Samuel Ricketts / Joel Angus	18; 21	17; 21
5	(South Africa) (Jamaica)	Deidre Laurens Jordaan / Johanita Scholtz; Tahlia Richardson / Katherine Wynter	21; 15	21; 16

South Africa
4
National Exhibition Centre, Court 4
29 July 2022, 19:00 UTC+1

Zambia
1

			1	2	3
1	(South Africa) (Zambia)	Jarred Elliot / Deidre Laurens Jordaan; Chongo Mulenga / Ogar Siamupangila	21; 13	21; 10
2	(South Africa) (Zambia)	Carden Kakora; Kalombo Mulenga	17; 21	21; 15	21; 12
3	(South Africa) (Zambia)	Johanita Scholtz; Elizaberth Chipeleme	21; 3	21; 9
4	(South Africa) (Zambia)	Jarred Elliott / Robert Summers; Chongo Mulenga / Kalombo Mulenga	17; 21	21; 16	13; 21
5	(South Africa) (Zambia)	Deidre Laurens Jordaan / Johanita Scholtz; Elizaberth Chipeleme / Ogar Siamupangila	21; 8	21; 8

Malaysia
5
National Exhibition Centre, Court 2
30 July 2022, 14:00 UTC+1

South Africa
0

			1	2	3
1	(Malaysia) (South Africa)	Aaron Chia / Pearly Tan; Jarred Elliot / Deidre Laurens Jordaan	21; 7	21; 8
2	(Malaysia) (South Africa)	Ng Tze Yong; Carden Kakora	21; 11	21; 8
3	(Malaysia) (South Africa)	Goh Jin Wei; Johanita Scholtz	21; 5	21; 4
4	(Malaysia) (South Africa)	Tan Kian Meng / Chan Peng Soon; Jarred Elliot / Robert Summers	21; 6	21; 9
5	(Malaysia) (South Africa)	Lai Pei Jing / Cheah Yee See; Deidre Laurens Jordaan / Johanita Scholtz	21; 18	21; 13

Quarterfinals

South Africa
0
National Exhibition Centre, Court 2
31 July 2022, 17:30 UTC+1

India
3

			1	2	3
1	(South Africa) (India)	Jarred Elliot / Deidré Laurens; B. Sumeeth Reddy / Ashwini Ponnappa	9; 21	11; 21
2	(South Africa) (India)	Carden Kakora; Lakshya Sen	5; 21	6; 21
3	(South Africa) (India)	Johanita Scholtz; Aakarshi Kashyap	11; 21	16; 21
4	(South Africa) (India)	Jarred Elliot / Robert Summers; Satwiksairaj Rankireddy / Chirag Shetty				not played
5	(South Africa) (India)	Deidré Laurens / Johanita Scholtz; Treesa Jolly / Gayatri Gopichand				not played

== 3x3 basketball ==
On 9 October 2021, South Africa qualified for both the men's and women's wheelchair tournaments. This was achieved by both teams winning the IWBF Africa Zone Qualifiers.

Squad selections were announced on 8 June 2022.

Summary

Team	Event	Group stage			Semifinal	Final / BM / CM	
Team	Event	Opposition Score	Opposition Score	Rank	Opposition Score	Opposition Score	Rank
South Africa men's (WC)	Men's wheelchair tournament	England; L 2–17	Malaysia; L 6–13	3	—N/a	Northern Ireland; L 7-10	6
South Africa women's (WC)	Women's wheelchair tournament	Scotland; L 2–16	Australia; L 3–21	3	—N/a	Kenya; W 6-5	5

=== Men's wheelchair tournament ===
Roster

- Allen Mtatase
- Cecil Dumond
- Ayabonga Jim
- Simanga Mbhele

Group play

Pos	Team	Pld	W	L	PF	PA	PD	Qualification
1	England (H)	2	2	0	38	11	+27	Semi-finals
2	Malaysia	2	1	1	22	25	−3	Semi-finals
3	South Africa	2	0	2	8	30	−22	5th place match

Source: Birmingham 2022
Rules for classification: 1) Wins; 2) Head-to-head record; 3) Points scored.
(H) Hosts

29 July 2022
15:30

Report

England	17–2	South Africa
Pts: Manning 6		Pts: Mtatase 2

Smithfield

31 July 2022
15:30

Report

South Africa	6–13	Malaysia
Pts: Dumond 3		Pts: Hamzah 5

Smithfield

Fifth place match

2 August 2022
15:00

Report

Northern Ireland	10–7	South Africa
Pts: Macsorley 6		Pts: Mbhele 7

Smithfield

=== Women's wheelchair tournament ===
Roster

- Aviwe Ngoni
- Samkelisiwe Mbatha
- Michelle Moganedi
- Kelebogile Moeng

Group play

Pos	Team	Pld	W	L	PF	PA	PD	Qualification
1	Australia	2	2	0	33	8	+25	Semi-finals
2	Scotland	2	1	1	21	14	+7	Semi-finals
3	South Africa	2	0	2	5	37	−32	5th place match

Source: Birmingham 2022
Rules for classification: 1) Wins; 2) Head-to-head record; 3) Points scored.

30 July 2022
19:30

Report

Scotland	16–2	South Africa
Pts: Hamer 10		Pts: Moeng 2

Smithfield

31 July 2022
19:30

Report

South Africa	3–21	Australia
Pts: Moeng 2		Pts: Merritt 11

Smithfield

Fifth place match

2 August 2022
15:00

Report

South Africa	6–5	Kenya
Pts: Moeng 5		Pts: Alar 4

Smithfield

== Beach volleyball ==
As of 26 April 2022, South Africa qualified for the men's tournament. This was achieved through their position at the African Qualifier in Accra.

Two players were selected as of 8 June 2022.

Athlete	Event	Preliminary Round				Quarterfinals	Semifinals	Finals	Rank
Athlete	Event	Opposition Score	Opposition Score	Opposition Score	Rank	Opposition Score	Opposition Score	Opposition Score	Rank
Leo Williams; Grant Goldschmidt	Men's tournament	Rwanda; L 0-2	Australia; L 0-2	Maldives; W 2-1	3	did not advance			

=== Men's tournament ===
Group B

Pos	Team	Pld	W	L	Pts	SW	SL	SR	SPW	SPL	SPR	Qualification
1	Burnett – McHugh (AUS)	3	3	0	6	6	0	MAX	126	88	1.432	Quarterfinals
2	Ntagengwa – Gatsinze (RWA)	3	2	1	5	4	3	1.333	127	128	0.992	Quarterfinals
3	Williams – Goldschmidt (RSA)	3	1	2	4	2	5	0.400	109	132	0.826	Ranking of third-placed teams
4	Ismail – Naseem (MDV)	3	0	3	3	2	6	0.333	129	143	0.902	

Source: birmingham2022.com

Qualified for the Quarterfinals

30 July 2022; 14:30	Ntagengwa – Gatsinze (RWA)	2–0	Williams – Goldschmidt (RSA)	Smithfield
30 July 2022; 14:30	(21–19, 21–16); Report			Smithfield

1 August 2022; 14:30	Burnett – McHugh (AUS)	2–0	Williams – Goldschmidt (RSA)	Smithfield
1 August 2022; 14:30	(21–12, 21–12); Report			Smithfield

3 August 2022; 19:00	Williams – Goldschmidt (RSA)	2–1	Ismail – Naseem (MDV)	Smithfield
3 August 2022; 19:00	(21–16, 14–21, 15–11); Report			Smithfield

== Boxing ==
Three boxers were selected as of 8 June 2022.

Athlete	Event	Round of 32	Round of 16	Quarterfinals	Semifinals	Final	
Athlete	Event	Opposition Result	Opposition Result	Opposition Result	Opposition Result	Opposition Result	Rank
Amzolele Dyeyi	Men's Featherweight	Mohammed (IND); L 0–5	did not advance				
Simnikiwe Bongco	Men's Middleweight	—N/a	Badjie (GAM); W 5–0	Moses (GRN); W 5–0	Peters (AUS); L 0–5	Did not advance	3rd place, bronze medalist(s)
Phiwokuhle Mnguni	Women's Featherweight	—N/a	—N/a	Muthuthanthri (SRI); W 5–0	Walsh (NIR); L 0–5	Did not advance	3rd place, bronze medalist(s)

== Cricket ==
By virtue of its position in the ICC Women's T20I rankings (as of 1 April 2021), South Africa qualified for the tournament.

Fixtures were announced in November 2021.

Summary

Team	Event	Group stage				Semifinal	Final / BM	
Team	Event	Opposition Result	Opposition Result	Opposition Result	Rank	Opposition Result	Opposition Result	Rank
South Africa women	Women's tournament	New Zealand; L by 13 runs	England; L by 26 runs	Sri Lanka; W by 10 wickets	3	did not advance		

Roster

The final squad was announced on 15 July 2022.

- Suné Luus (c)
- Anneke Bosch
- Trisha Chetty
- Lara Goodall
- Sinalo Jafta
- Marizanne Kapp
- Ayabonga Khaka
- Masabata Klaas
- Nadine de Klerk
- Nonkululeko Mlaba
- Mignon du Preez
- Tumi Sekhukhune
- Shabnim Ismail
- Chloe Tryon
- Laura Wolvaardt

Group play

Pos	Team	Pld	W	L	NR	Pts	NRR
1	England	3	3	0	0	6	1.826
2	New Zealand	3	2	1	0	4	0.068
3	South Africa	3	1	2	0	2	1.118
4	Sri Lanka	3	0	3	0	0	−2.805

Source: ESPNcricinfo

30 July 2022
11:00
Scorecard

New Zealand; 167/2 (20 overs)	v	South Africa; 154/7 (20 overs)
Suzie Bates 91* (64); Nonkululeko Mlaba 1/33 (4 overs)		Chloe Tryon 39 (17); Sophie Devine 3/37 (4 overs)

New Zealand won by 13 runs
Edgbaston, Birmingham
Umpires: Claire Polosak (Aus) and Vrinda Rathi (Ind)
Player of the match: Suzie Bates (NZ)

- South Africa won the toss and elected to field.
- Eden Carson, Izzy Gaze and Fran Jonas (NZ) all made their WT20I debuts.
- Sophie Devine (NZ) took her 100th wicket in WT20Is.

2 August 2022
11:00
Scorecard

England; 167/5 (20 overs)	v	South Africa; 141/4 (20 overs)
Alice Capsey 50 (37); Shabnim Ismail 2/27 (4 overs)		Laura Wolvaardt 41* (33); Katherine Brunt 1/16 (3 overs)

England won by 26 runs
Edgbaston, Birmingham
Umpires: Claire Polosak (Aus) and Vrinda Rathi (Ind)
Player of the match: Alice Capsey (Eng)

- South Africa won the toss and elected to field.

4 August 2022
11:00
Scorecard

Sri Lanka; 46 (17.1 overs)	v	South Africa; 47/0 (6.1 overs)
Chamari Athapaththu 15 (29); Nadine de Klerk 3/7 (4 overs)		Tazmin Brits 21* (21)

South Africa won by 10 wickets
Edgbaston, Birmingham
Umpires: Claire Polosak (Aus) and Jacqueline Williams (WI)
Player of the match: Nadine de Klerk (SA)

- South Africa won the toss and elected to field.

== Cycling ==
Eleven cyclists were selected as of 8 June 2022.

=== Road ===
Men

Athlete	Event	Time	Rank
Gustav Basson	Road race	3:38:11	66
Daryl Impey	Road race	3:28:29	2nd place, silver medalist(s)
Callum Ormiston	Road race	3:37.08	37
Morne van Niekerk	Road race	3:28.55	12
Gustav Basson	Time trial	52:04.58	18
Daryl Impey	Time trial	DNS	
Reinardt Janse van Rensburg	Time trial	DNS	

Women

Athlete	Event	Time	Rank
Kerry Jonker	Road race	2:50.03	39
Ashleigh Moolman Pasio	Road race	2:44:46	11
Hayley Preen	Road race	2:44:46	12
Kerry Jonker	Time trial	DNS	
Ashleigh Moolman Pasio	Time trial	DNS	
Hayley Preen	Time trial	DNS	

=== Mountain bike ===
Athlete	Event	Time	Rank
Candice Lill	Women's cross-country	01:36:12	3rd place, bronze medalist(s)

== Gymnastics ==
A squad of five gymnasts was selected as of 8 June 2022. Two gymnasts were added to the squad on 4 July 2022.

=== Artistic ===
Men
Individual Qualification

Athlete	Event	Apparatus						Total	Rank
Athlete	Event	F	PH	R	V	PB	HB	Total	Rank
Muhammad Khaalid Mia	All-around	12.400	8.850	12.100	13.150	12.950	12.800	72.250	19 Q

Individual Final

Athlete	Event	Apparatus						Total	Rank
Athlete	Event	F	PH	R	V	PB	HB	Total	Rank
Muhammad Khaalid Mia	All-around	12.200	13.200	11.850	12.900	13.250	12.300	75.700	14

Women
Team Final & Individual Qualification

Athlete	Event	Apparatus				Total	Rank
Athlete	Event	V	UB	BB	F	Total	Rank
Caitlin Rooskrantz	Team	12.950	13.350 Q	11.100	12.500	49.900	10 Q
Naveen Daries	Team	12.950 Q	12.050	~~10.800~~	12.550 Q	48.350	12 Q
Mammule Rankoe	Team	—N/a	~~10.900~~	11.950	—N/a	—N/a	
Shante Koti	Team	~~11.800~~	—N/a	12.100 Q	11.750	—N/a	
Garcelle Napier	Team	13.000	11.500	—N/a	~~11.550~~	—N/a	
Total	Team	38.900	36.900	35.150	36.800	147.750	4

Individual Finals

Athlete	Event	Apparatus				Total	Rank
Athlete	Event	V	UB	BB	F	Total	Rank
Naveen Daries	All-around	12.95	12.8	11.4	12.7	49.85	6
Naveen Daries	Vault	12.550	—N/a			12.550	7
Naveen Daries	Women's floor	—N/a			12.200	12.200	7
Caitlin Rooskrantz	All-around	12.85	12.15	10.85	12.5	48.35	9
Caitlin Rooskrantz	Uneven bars	—N/a	13.433	—N/a		13.433	3rd place, bronze medalist(s)
Shante Koti	Balance beam	—N/a		10.366	—N/a	10.366	8

=== Rhythmic ===
Individual Qualification

Athlete	Event	Apparatus				Total	Rank
Athlete	Event	Hoop	Ball	Clubs	Ribbon	Total	Rank
Kayla Rondi	Qualification	22.100	21.950	24.400	23.800	92.250	20 Q

Individual Finals

Athlete	Event	Apparatus				Total	Rank
Athlete	Event	Hoop	Ball	Clubs	Ribbon	Total	Rank
Kayla Rondi	All-around	23.000	24.400	23.800	24.400	94.600	16

== Hockey ==
By virtue of their position in the FIH World Rankings for men and women respectively (as of 1 February 2022), South Africa qualified for both tournaments.

Detailed fixtures were released on 9 March 2022.

Summary

Key:

- FT = After full time
- P = Match decided by penalty-shootout

Team	Event	Preliminary round					Semi-final	Final / BM / PM	
Team	Event	Opposition Result	Opposition Result	Opposition Result	Opposition Result	Rank	Opposition Result	Opposition Result	Rank
South Africa men	Men's tournament	Pakistan; D 2–2	Scotland; W 5–4	Australia; L 0–3	New Zealand; W 4–3	2 Q	India; L 2–3	England; L 3–6	4
South Africa women	Women's tournament	Scotland; L 2–4	Australia; L 0–5	Kenya; W 15–0	New Zealand; L 1–4	4	—N/a	Wales; W 1–0	7

=== Men's tournament ===
Roster

A squad of eighteen players was selected as of 4 July 2022.

- Connor Beauchamp
- Gowan Jones
- Daniel Bell
- Ryan Julius
- Matt Guise-Brown
- Tevin Kok
- Dayaan Cassiem
- Peabo Lembethe
- Mustapha Cassiem
- Samkelo Mvimbi
- Timothy Drummond
- Siya Nolutshungu
- Jethro Eustice
- Nqobile Ntuli
- Keenan Horne
- Taine Paton
- Le-Neal Jackson
- Nicholas Spooner

Reserves: Sihle Ngubane, Matt de Sousa

Group play

Pos	Team	Pld	W	D	L	GF	GA	GD	Pts	Qualification
1	Australia	4	4	0	0	29	2	+27	12	Semi-finals
2	South Africa	4	2	1	1	11	12	−1	7	Semi-finals
3	New Zealand	4	1	1	2	14	17	−3	4	Fifth place match
4	Pakistan	4	1	1	2	6	15	−9	4	Seventh place match
5	Scotland	4	0	1	3	11	25	−14	1	Ninth place match

Source: Birmingham 2022
Rules for classification: 1) points; 2) number of wins; 3) goal difference; 4) goals scored; 5) head-to-head results.

30 July 2022
09:00

South Africa	2–2	Pakistan
Beauchamp 14'; Guise-Brown 54'	Report	R. Ali 25'; Hakeem 60'

Umpires:
Nick Bennett (ENG)
Bruce Bale (ENG)

1 August 2022
14:00

Scotland	4–5	South Africa
McConnell 33'; Forsyth 35'; C. Golden 38'; Walker 43'	Report	D. Cassiem 2'; Spooner 24'; Ntuli 43'; Guise-Brown 56'; Paton 60'

Umpires:
Nick Bennett (ENG)
Steve Rogers (AUS)

3 August 2022
21:00

South Africa	0–3	Australia
	Report	Whetton 4'; Zalewski 8'; Govers 55'

Umpires:
Fraser Bell (SCO)
Bruce Bale (ENG)

4 August 2022
19:00

South Africa	4–3	New Zealand
Guise-Brown 3', 18'; Horne 7'; Beauchamp 53'	Report	Lane 9'; Smith 39'; Inglis 47'

Umpires:
Dan Barstow (ENG)
Bruce Bale (ENG)

Semi-final

6 August 2022
18:00

India	3–2	South Africa
Abhishek 20'; Mandeep 28'; Jugraj 58'	Report	Julius 33'; M. Cassiem 59'

Umpires:
Dan Barstow (ENG)
Steve Rogers (AUS)

Bronze medal match

8 August 2022
09:00

England	6–3	South Africa
Smith 19'; Ansell 24'; Ward 25'; Roper 40', 50'; Wallace 59'	Report	Guise-Brown 18'; M. Cassiem 22'; Ntuli 30'

Umpires:
Tyler Klenk (CAN)
Steve Rogers (AUS)

=== Women's tournament ===
Roster

A squad of eighteen players was selected as of 8 June 2022.

- Bernadette Coston
- Bianca Wood
- Edith Molikoe
- Erin Christie
- Hannah Pearce
- Hanrie Louw
- Jean-Leigh du Toit
- Kristen Paton
- Lisa-Marie Deetlefs
- Lilian du Plessis
- Maboloke Serage
- Marizen Marais
- Onthatile Zulu
- Phumelela Mbande
- Quanita Bobbs
- Robyn Johnson
- Shirndré-Lee Simmons
- Tarryn Lombard

Reserves: Kayla de Waal, Charné Maddocks, Kirsty Adams, Sylvia van Jaarsveld & Mathaphelo Ramasimong

Group play

Pos	Team	Pld	W	D	L	GF	GA	GD	Pts	Qualification
1	Australia	4	4	0	0	16	0	+16	12	Semi-finals
2	New Zealand	4	3	0	1	21	2	+19	9	Semi-finals
3	Scotland	4	2	0	2	15	5	+10	6	Fifth place match
4	South Africa	4	1	0	3	18	13	+5	3	Seventh place match
5	Kenya	4	0	0	4	0	50	−50	0	Ninth place match

Source: Birmingham 2022
Rules for classification: 1) points; 2) number of wins; 3) goal difference; 4) goals scored; 5) head-to-head results.

29 July 2022
11:00

South Africa	2–4	Scotland
Deetlefs 8', 12'	Report	Watson 7'; S. Robertson 19'; Burnet 32'; Eadie 53'

Umpires:
Hannah Harrison (ENG)
Cathy Wright (WAL)

31 July 2022
21:00

South Africa	0–5	Australia
	Report	Squibb 3', 48'; Taylor 32'; Kershaw 36'; Nobbs 46'

Umpires:
Rachel Williams (ENG)
Amber Church(NZL)

2 August 2022
16:00

Kenya	0–15	South Africa
	Report	Du Toit 4', 27', 43', 46', 57'; Lombard 11', 56'; Du Plessis 12', 40', 51', 53'; Hunter 14', 27'; Paton 35'; Coston 60'

Umpires:
Rebecca Woodcock (ENG)
Binish Hayat (PAK)

4 August 2022
09:00

South Africa	1–4	New Zealand
Du Toit 50'	Report	Jopp 10'; Lench 11'; Ralph 12'; Cotter 49'

Umpires:
Rebecca Woodcock (ENG)
Lelia Sacre (CAN)

Seventh place match

5 August 2022
11:15

Wales	0–1	South Africa
	Report	Du Plessis 38'

Umpires:
Lelia Sacre (CAN)
Cookie Tan (SGP)

== Judo ==
A squad of four judoka was selected as of 8 June 2022.

Athlete	Event	Round of 16	Quarterfinals	Semifinals	Repechage	Final/BM	
Athlete	Event	Opposition Result	Opposition Result	Opposition Result	Opposition Result	Opposition Result	Rank
Thomas-Laszlo Breytenbach	Men's -90 kg	—N/a	Bye	Petgrave (ENG); L 00-10	—N/a	Shah (PAK); L 00-10	5
Michaela Whitebooi	Women's -48 kg	Bye	Barnikel (WAL); W 10-00	Platten (ENG); W 01-00	Bye	Likmabam (IND); W 01-00	1st place, gold medalist(s)
Charne Griesel	Women's -52 kg	Bye	Javadian (NIR); L 00-10	Did not advance	Asvesta (CYP); W 01-00	Baba Matia (CMR); W 11-00	3rd place, bronze medalist(s)
Dibbe Breytenbach	Women's -57 kg	Bye	Nairne (ENG); L 00-01	Did not advance	Tariyal (IND); L 00-11	Did not advance	7

== Lawn bowls ==
A squad of ten players and six parasport players (plus two directors) was officially selected on 8 June 2022.

Men

Athlete	Event	Group Stage					Quarterfinal	Semifinal	Final / BM	
Athlete	Event	Opposition Score	Opposition Score	Opposition Score	Opposition Score	Rank	Opposition Score	Opposition Score	Opposition Score	Rank
Jason Evans	Singles	Kimani (KEN); W 21–10	Priaulx (GGY); W 21–16	Jim (COK); W 21-9	Wilson (AUS); L 9–21	2 Q	Kelly (NIR); L 12–21	did not advance		
Wayne Rittmuller; Prince Neluonde	Pairs	Fiji; W 18–14	Guernsey; W 21–13	Australia; W 17–8	—N/a	1 Q	Wales; L 11–16	did not advance		
Jason Evans; Petrus Breitenbach; Bradley Robinson	Triples	Canada; L 10–17	England; L 14–22	Malaysia; W 17–12	—N/a	3	did not advance			
Wayne Rittmuller; Petrus Breitenbach; Prince Neluonde; Bradley Robinson	Fours	New Zealand; W 14–13	Malaysia; L 19–15	Scotland; L 15–10	—N/a	3	did not advance			

Women

Athlete	Event	Group Stage					Quarterfinal	Semifinal	Final / BM	
Athlete	Event	Opposition Score	Opposition Score	Opposition Score	Opposition Score	Rank	Opposition Score	Opposition Score	Opposition Score	Rank
Colleen Piketh	Singles	Mataio (COK); W 21–14	Tikoisuva (FIJ); L 13–21	Wilson (NFK); L 18–21	—N/a	3	did not advance			
Colleen Piketh; Bridget Calitz	Pairs	Niue; W 26–9	New Zealand; L 10–19	India; D 16–16	—N/a	3	did not advance			
Johanna Snyman; Esme Kruger; Thabelo Muvhango	Triples	Northern Ireland; L 14–15	Singapore; L 19–18	Australia; W 17–12	Falkland Islands; W 20–14	3	did not advance			
Johanna Snyman; Esme Kruger; Bridget Calitz; Thabelo Muvhango	Fours	Niue; W 24–7	Wales; W 16–15	New Zealand; T 14–14	—N/a	2 Q	England; W 12–11	Fiji; W 16–14	India; L 10–17	2nd place, silver medalist(s)

Parasport

Athlete	Event	Group Stage						Semifinal	Final / BM	
Athlete	Event	Opposition Score	Opposition Score	Opposition Score	Opposition Score	Opposition Score	Rank	Opposition Score	Opposition Score	Rank
Willem Viljoen; Deon van der Vyver	Men's pairs B6-8	England; L 13–16	New Zealand; L 7–17	Scotland; L 10–18	Australia; D 12–12	Wales; L 9–14	6	did not advance		
Desiree Levin; Victoria van der Merwe	Women's pairs B6-8	England; W 17–13	Scotland; W 23–11	Australia; L 7–18	New Zealand; W 25–8	—N/a	2 Q	Australia; L 12–19	England; W 16–7	3rd place, bronze medalist(s)
Herman Scholtz directed by Anna van Rooyen; Tracy Smith directed by Tommy Smith	Mixed pairs B2-3	Scotland; L 6–28	Wales; L 8–15	England; L 8–14	New Zealand; W 22–8	Australia; L 12–16	5	did not advance		

== Netball ==
By virtue of its position in the World Netball Rankings (as of 28 July 2021), South Africa qualified for the tournament.

Partial fixtures were announced in November 2021, then updated with the remaining qualifiers in March 2022.

Summary

Team	Event	Group stage						Semifinal	Final / BM / Cl.	
Team	Event	Opposition Result	Opposition Result	Opposition Result	Opposition Result	Opposition Result	Rank	Opposition Result	Opposition Result	Rank
South Africa women	Women's tournament	Jamaica; L 49–68	Barbados; W 91–36	Australia; L 49–74	Wales; W 69–51	Scotland; W 65–46	3	—N/a	Uganda; L 48–54	6

Roster

- Khanyisa Chawane
- Izette Griesel
- Phumza Maweni
- Tshinakaho Mdau
- Bongiwe Msomi (c)
- Lefébre Rademan
- Nicola Smith
- Nichole Taljaard
- Elmeré van der Berg
- Shadine van der Merwe
- Ine-Marí Venter
- Zanele Vimbela

Group play

Pos	Team	Pld	W	D	L	GF	GA	GD	Pts	Qualification
1	Jamaica	5	5	0	0	378	205	+173	10	Semi-finals
2	Australia	5	4	0	1	386	187	+199	8	Semi-finals
3	South Africa	5	3	0	2	323	275	+48	6	Classification matches
4	Wales	5	2	0	3	235	306	−71	4	Classification matches
5	Scotland	5	1	0	4	224	302	−78	2	Classification matches
6	Barbados	5	0	0	5	150	421	−271	0	Classification matches

Source: Birmingham 2022

30 July 2022; 18:00	Report	Jamaica	68–49	South Africa	National Exhibition Centre; Umpires: Angela Armstrong-Lush; Joshua Bowring
30 July 2022; 18:00	Report	Beckford 15/18 (83%); Fowler 33/33 (100%); Nelson 14/14 (100%); Robison 6/6 (100%)		Rademan 6/8 (75%) van der Berg 13/15 (87%); Venter 30/36 (83%)	National Exhibition Centre; Umpires: Angela Armstrong-Lush; Joshua Bowring

31 July 2022; 14:00	Report	South Africa	91–36	Barbados	National Exhibition Centre; Umpires: Gareth Fowler; Bronwen Adams
31 July 2022; 14:00	Report	Rademan 12/16 (75%); Taljaard 18/20 (90%) van der Berg 47/49 (96%); Venter 14/16 (88%)		Blackman 21/24 (88%); Wharton 15/21 (71%)	National Exhibition Centre; Umpires: Gareth Fowler; Bronwen Adams

1 August 2022; 12:00	Report	Australia	74–49	South Africa	National Exhibition Centre; Umpires: Gareth Fowler; Angela Armstrong-Lush
1 August 2022; 12:00	Report	Austin 12/14 (86%); Bueta 34/34 (100%); Koenen 14/14 (100%); Wood 14/14 (100%)		Rademan 4/5 (80%); Taljaard 4/5 (80%) van der Berg 10/10 (100%); Venter 31/38 (82%)	National Exhibition Centre; Umpires: Gareth Fowler; Angela Armstrong-Lush

3 August 2022; 12:00	Report	South Africa	69–51	Wales	National Exhibition Centre; Umpires: Angela Armstrong-Lush; Bronwen Adams
3 August 2022; 12:00	Report	Taljaard 1/1 (100%) van der Berg 35/39 (90%); Venter 33/36 (92%)		Creak 26/37 (70%); Roberts 4/5 (80%); Rowe 21/25 (84%)	National Exhibition Centre; Umpires: Angela Armstrong-Lush; Bronwen Adams

4 August 2022; 19:00	Report	South Africa	65–46	Scotland	National Exhibition Centre; Umpires: Ken Metekingi; Kate Wright
4 August 2022; 19:00	Report	Rademan 6/7 (86%) van der Berg 17/17 (100%); Venter 42/44 (95%)		Barrie 12/14 (86%); Goodwin 21/25 (84%); McCall 13/15 (87%)	National Exhibition Centre; Umpires: Ken Metekingi; Kate Wright

Fifth place match

5 August 2022; 17:00	Report	South Africa	48–54	Uganda	National Exhibition Centre; Umpires: Tara Warner; Gary Burgess
5 August 2022; 17:00	Report	Rademan 6/7 (86%) van der Berg 17/18 (94%); Venter 25/29 (86%)		Cholhok 31/35 (89%); Eyaru 21/24 (88%); Nassanga 2/2 (100%)	National Exhibition Centre; Umpires: Tara Warner; Gary Burgess

== Rugby sevens ==
As of 30 April 2022, South Africa qualified for both tournaments. The men qualified through their positions in the 2018–19 / 2019–20 World Rugby Sevens Series, whilst the women qualified by winning the 2022 Africa Women's Sevens in Jemmal, Tunisia.

The rosters of both squads were announced on 8 June 2022.

Summary

Team	Event	Preliminary Round				Quarterfinal / CQ	Semifinal / CS	Final / BM / CF	
Team	Event	Opposition Result	Opposition Result	Opposition Result	Rank	Opposition Result	Opposition Result	Opposition Result	Rank
South Africa men's	Men's tournament	Malaysia; W 46–0	Tonga; W 36–5	Scotland; W 34–0	1 Q	Canada; W 33–0	Australia; W 24–12	Fiji; W 31–7	1st place, gold medalist(s)
South Africa women's	Women's tournament	Australia; L 0–38	Fiji; L 0–41	Scotland; L 12–33	4	—N/a	England; L 0–36	Sri Lanka; W 52–0	7

=== Men's tournament ===
Squad

- Sako Makata
- Impi Visser
- Zain Davids
- Angelo Davids
- JC Pretorius
- Selvyn Davids
- Ronald Brown
- Dewald Human
- Siviwe Soyizwapi
- Muller du Plessis
- Mfundo Ndhlovu
- Christie Grobbelaar
- Shaun Williams

Pool B

Pos	Team	Pld	W	D	L	PF	PA	PD	Pts	Qualification
1	South Africa	3	3	0	0	116	5	+111	9	Advance to Quarter-finals
2	Scotland	3	2	0	1	91	46	+45	7	Advance to Quarter-finals
3	Tonga	3	1	0	2	36	84	−48	5	Advance to classification Quarter-finals
4	Malaysia	3	0	0	3	19	127	−108	3	Advance to classification Quarter-finals

Source: Birmingham2022
Rules for classification: 1) Points; 2) Head-to-head result; 3) Point difference; 4) Points scored.

29 July 2022
11:56

South Africa	46–0	Malaysia
Try: A. Davids (3) 1' m, 6' m, 11' m du Plessis 5' c S. Davids 7' m Soyizwapi 8' c Human 10' m S. Davids 14' c Con: Brown (2/6) 5', 9'; Williams (0/1); Human (1/1) 14'	Report

Coventry Stadium, Coventry
Referee: Tevita Rokovereni (Fiji)

29 July 2022
20:48

South Africa	36–5	Tonga
Try: Soyizwapi 1' m Grobbelaar (2) 3' c, 5' m Pretorius 8' m Makata 9' c Human 14' c Con: Brown (2/5) 4', 9'; Human (1/1) 14'	Report	Try: Asi 7' m Con: Asi (0/1); Cards: Ika (red card) 13'

Coventry Stadium, Coventry
Referee: Jordan Way (Australia)

30 July 2022
12:18

South Africa	34–0	Scotland
Try: S. Davids 4' m Pretorius 6' m A. Davids (3) 8' c, 10' m, 12' m Williams 14' c Con: Brown (0/2); S. Davids (1/1) 9'; Williams (0/1); Human (1/2) 14'	Report

Coventry Stadium, Coventry
Referee: Nick Hogan (New Zealand)

Quarter–finals

30 July 2022
20:48

South Africa	33–0	Canada
Try: Brown (2) 1' c, 9' m Grobbelaar 5' c A. Davids 7' c Ndhlovu 12' c Con: Brown (2/2) 1', 6'; S. Davids (1/2) 7'; Human (1/1) 12'; Cards: Brown (yellow card) 7'	Report

Coventry Stadium, Coventry
Referee: Finlay Brown (Scotland)

Semi–finals

31 July 2022
13:04

Australia	12–24	South Africa
Try: Nawaqanitawase 1' m Gonzalez 6' c Con: Roache (1/2) 6'; Cards: Hutchison (yellow card) 7'	Report	Try: A. Davids (3) 4' c, 7' m, 12' m S. Davids 8' c Con: Brown (1/1) 4'; A. Davids (0/1); S. Davids (1/1) 8'; Williams (0/1)

Coventry Stadium, Coventry
Referee: Adam Leal (England)

Gold medal match

31 July 2022
21:04

Fiji	7–31	South Africa
Try: Nacuqu 10' c Con: Nacuqu (1/1) 11'	Report	Try: du Plessis (2) 2' c, 8' c Pretorius 4' m Williams 6' m, Ndhlovu 13' c Con: Williams (2/3) 2', 8'; S. Davids (0/1); Human (1/1) 14'

Coventry Stadium, Coventry
Referee: Adam Leal (England)

=== Women's tournament ===
Squad

- Donelle Snyders
- Felicia Jacobs
- Bianca Augustyn
- Snenhlanhla Shozi
- Mathrin Simmers
- Asisipho Plaatjies
- Anacadia Minnaar
- Unathi Mali
- Liske Lategan
- Kemisetso Baloyi
- Kyla de Vries
- Nontuthuko Shongwe
- Zandile Masuku

Pool B

Pos	Team	Pld	W	D	L	PF	PA	PD	Pts	Qualification
1	Fiji	3	3	0	0	91	24	+67	9	Semi-finals
2	Australia	3	2	0	1	100	19	+81	7	Semi-finals
3	Scotland	3	1	0	2	45	93	−48	5	Classification semi-finals
4	South Africa	3	0	0	3	12	112	−100	3	Classification semi-finals

Updated to match(es) played on 29 July 2022. Source: Birmingham2022
Rules for classification: 1) Points; 2) Head-to-head result; 3) Point difference; 4) Points scored.

29 July 2022
09:00

Australia	38–0	South Africa
Try: Levi (2) 1' c, 6' c Nathan 2' m Caslick (2) 4' c, 8' c Ashby 14' m Con: Hinds (3/4) 1', 5', 6'; Williams (0/1)	Report

Coventry Stadium, Coventry
Referee: Hollie Davidson (Scotland)

29 July 2022
17:30

Fiji	41–0	South Africa
Try: Uluinisau (2) 2' c, 11' c Buleki 3' m Naimasi 6' c Donu (2) 8' m, 9' m Cavuru 13' m Con: Naimasi (2/4) 2', 7'; Riwai (0/1); Uluinisau (1/1) 11'; Cavuru (0/1)	Report

Coventry Stadium, Coventry
Referee: Tyler Miller (Australia)

30 July 2022
09:00

Scotland	33–12	South Africa
Try: Lloyd (3) 2' c, 4' m, 13' c McLachlan 3' c Orr 7' c Con: Thomson (3/4) 3', 4', 7'; Smith (1/1) 14'	Report	Try: Lategan 1' m Snyders 10' c Con: Shongwe (0/1); Snyders (1/1) 10'; Cards: Masuku (yellow card) 12'

Coventry Stadium, Coventry
Referee: Tyler Miller (Australia)

Classification semi-finals

30 July 2022
17:30

England	36–0	South Africa
Try: Cowell 2' c Uren 3' m Doidge 8' m Norman-Bell (2) 11' c, 12' m Wilson-Hardy 14' c Con: Maude (1/3) 2'; Norman-Bell (2/3) 11', 14'	Report

Coventry Stadium, Coventry
Referee: Selica Winiata (New Zealand)

Seventh place match

31 July 2022
18:00

South Africa	52–0	Sri Lanka
Try: Jacobs (3) 1' c, 12' c, 14' m Lategan (3) 2' c, 3' m, 5' c Masuku (2) 7' c, 11' c Con: Snyders (4/5) 1', 3', 5', 7'; Shongwe (2/3) 11', 12'	Report

Coventry Stadium, Coventry
Referee: Selica Winiata (New Zealand)

== Swimming ==
A squad of twenty-one swimmers and para swimmers, including Tokyo 2020 champion Tatjana Schoenmaker, was selected as of 8 June 2022. The para swimmers qualified through the World Para Swimming World Rankings (for performances registered between 31 December 2020 and 18 April 2022).

Two swimmers were added to the squad on 4 July 2022.

Men

Athlete	Event	Heat		Semifinal		Final	
Athlete	Event	Time	Rank	Time	Rank	Time	Rank
Clayton Jimmie	50 m freestyle	22.98	14 Q	22.62	11	did not advance	
Christian Sadie	50 m freestyle S7	—N/a				29.78	3rd place, bronze medalist(s)
Guy Brooks	100 m freestyle	50.68	19	did not advance			
Pieter Coetze	100 m freestyle	50.33	16 Q	Withdrew		did not advance	
Matthew Sates	100 m freestyle	DNS		did not advance			
Andrew Ross	200 m freestyle	1:49.75	18	—N/a		did not advance	
Matthew Sates	200 m freestyle	1:48.25	7 Q	—N/a		1:47.75	6
Andrew Ross	400 m freestyle	3:58.44	16	—N/a		did not advance	
Matthew Sates	400 m freestyle	3:49.69	6 Q	—N/a		3:50.070	7
Pieter Coetze	50 m backstroke	24.95	1 Q	24.81	1 Q	24.77	2nd place, silver medalist(s)
Pieter Coetze	100 m backstroke	53.91	1 Q	53.67	1 Q	53.78	1st place, gold medalist(s)
Guy Brooks	200 m backstroke	2:07.49	14	—N/a		did not advance	
Pieter Coetze	200 m backstroke	1:58.08	4 Q	—N/a		1:56.77	3rd place, bronze medalist(s)
Brenden Crawford	50 m breaststroke	27.77	9 Q	24.75	10	did not advance	
Michael Houlie	50 m breaststroke	27.10	6 Q	27.39	3 Q	27.36	4
Brenden Crawford	100 m breaststroke	1:01.11	8 Q	1:00.64	8 Q	1:01.980	8
Michael Houlie	100 m breaststroke	1:01.62	12 Q	1:01.24	12	did not advance	
Christian Sadie	100 m breaststroke SB8	—N/a				1:22.140	5
Clayton Jimmie	50 m butterfly	24.17	16 Q	24.09	15	did not advance	
Chad le Clos	50 m butterfly	23.80	8 Q	23.67	11	did not advance	
Chad le Clos	100 m butterfly	52.65	9 Q	51.64	2 Q	51.61	4
Andrew Ross	100 m butterfly	54.26	18	did not advance			
Matthew Sates	100 m butterfly	54.02	14 Q	Withdrew		did not advance	
Chad le Clos	200 m butterfly	1:56.85	2 Q	—N/a		1:55.890	2nd place, silver medalist(s)
Guy Brooks	200 m individual medley	DNS		—N/a		did not advance	
Andrew Ross	200 m individual medley	2:03.47	13	—N/a		did not advance	
Matthew Sates	200 m individual medley	2:01.99	12	—N/a		did not advance	
Matthew Sates	400 m individual medley	4:19.04	3 Q	—N/a		4:16.61	4
Guy Brooks; Clayton Jimmie; Andrew Ross; Brenden Crawford	4 × 100 m freestyle relay	3:24.68	6 Q	—N/a		3:23.41	6
Matthew Sates; Chad le Clos; Andrew Ross; Pieter Coetze	4 × 200 m freestyle relay	—N/a				7:13.76	6
Andrew Ross; Michael Houlie; Guy Brooks; Clayton Jimmie	4 × 100 m medley relay	DNS		—N/a		did not advance	

Women

Athlete	Event	Heat		Semifinal		Final	
Athlete	Event	Time	Rank	Time	Rank	Time	Rank
Emma Chelius	50 m freestyle	25.11	5 Q	24.94	5 Q	24.78	4
Erin Gallagher	50 m freestyle	25.54	10 Q	25.31	7 Q	25.39	8
Olivia Nel	50 m freestyle	25.40	8 Q	25.38	9	did not advance	
Alani Ferreira	50 m freestyle S13	—N/a				30.89	7
Cornelle Leach	50 m freestyle S13	—N/a				31.34	8
Aimee Canny	100 m freestyle	55.27	4 Q	54.78	7 Q	54.88	6
Emma Chelius	100 m freestyle	55.63	9 Q	55.8	11	did not advance	
Erin Gallagher	100 m freestyle	56.10	13 Q	Withdrew		did not advance	
Aimee Canny	200 m freestyle	2:00.10	9	—N/a		did not advance	
Michaela Pulford	200 m freestyle	2:01.21	12	—N/a		did not advance	
Dune Coetzee	400 m freestyle	4:14.92	8 Q	—N/a		4:15.53	8
Trinity Hearne	400 m freestyle	4:26.22	12	—N/a		did not advance	
Michaela Pulford	400 m freestyle	4:18.76	11	—N/a		did not advance	
Michaela Pulford	800 m freestyle	8:48.84	7 Q	—N/a		8:44.77	6
Rebecca Meder	50 m backstroke	29.55	13 Q	28.69	8 Q	28.66	8
Olivia Nel	50 m backstroke	28.79	8 Q	28.73	9	did not advance	
Rebecca Meder	100 m backstroke	1:01.78	7 Q	1:01.71	8 Q	1:02.060	7
Kaylene Corbett	50 m breaststroke	31.07	7 Q	31.43	8 Q	31.10	6
Tatjana Schoenmaker	50 m breaststroke	30.76	4 Q	30.94	5 Q	30.41	4
Lara van Niekerk	50 m breaststroke	29.82	1 Q	29.80	1 Q	29.73 GR	1st place, gold medalist(s)
Kaylene Corbett	100 m breaststroke	1:08.12	8 Q	1:07.960	7 Q	1:07.62	7
Tatjana Schoenmaker	100 m breaststroke	1:07.10	2 Q	1:06.430	2 Q	1:06.68	2nd place, silver medalist(s)
Lara van Niekerk	100 m breaststroke	1:06.40	1 Q	1:05.960	1 Q	1:05.47	1st place, gold medalist(s)
Kaylene Corbett	200 m breaststroke	2:25.08	4 Q	—N/a		2:23.670	3rd place, bronze medalist(s)
Tatjana Schoenmaker	200 m breaststroke	2:21.76	1 Q	—N/a		2:21.920	1st place, gold medalist(s)
Erin Gallagher	50 m butterfly	26.96	10 Q	26.17	2 Q	26.05	2nd place, silver medalist(s)
Trinity Hearne	50 m butterfly	27.83	20	did not advance			
Rebecca Meder	50 m butterfly	27.16	11 Q	26.84	11	did not advance	
Dune Coetzee	100 m butterfly	1:00.19	15 Q	1:00.51	15	did not advance	
Erin Gallagher	100 m butterfly	59.29	9 Q	59.02	9	did not advance	
Trinity Hearne	100 m butterfly	1:00.42	16 Q	1:00.60	16	did not advance	
Dune Coetzee	200 m butterfly	2:12.40	10	—N/a		did not advance	
Trinity Hearne	200 m butterfly	2:14.82	12	—N/a		did not advance	
Rebecca Meder	200 m individual medley	2:12.57	2 Q	—N/a		2:12.01	4
Rebecca Meder	400 m individual medley	4:51.65	9	—N/a		did not advance	
Aimee Canny; Emma Chelius; Olivia Nel; Erin Gallagher	4 × 100 m freestyle relay	—N/a				3:40.31	4
Aimee Canny; Duné Coetzee; Erin Gallagher; Michaela Pulford	4 × 200 m freestyle relay	—N/a				8:02.25	4
Rebecca Meder; Lara van Niekerk; Erin Gallagher; Aimee Canny	4 × 100 m medley relay	—N/a				3:59.63	4

Mixed

Athlete	Event	Heat		Final	
Athlete	Event	Time	Rank	Time	Rank
Clayton Jimmie; Guy Brooks; Emma Chelius; Olivia Nel	4 × 100 m freestyle relay	DSQ		did not advance	
Pieter Coetze; Lara van Niekerk; Chad le Clos; Aimee Canny; Rebecca Meder; Brenden Crawford; Matthew Sates; Emma Chelius	4 × 100 m medley relay	3:51.56	4 Q	3:44.38	4

== Table tennis ==
South Africa qualified for both the men's and women's team events via the ITTF World Team Rankings (as of 2 January 2020). Eight players (four per team) were selected as of 8 June 2022.

Singles

Athletes	Event	Group stage			Round of 32	Round of 16	Quarterfinal	Semifinal	Final / BM	
Athletes	Event	Opposition Score	Opposition Score	Rank	Opposition Score	Opposition Score	Opposition Score	Opposition Score	Opposition Score	Rank
Theo Cogill	Men's singles	Chambers (AUS); L 0 - 4	Sotomayor (FLK); W 4 - 0	2	did not advance					
Shaun Jones	Men's singles	Chen (CAN); L 0–4	Yiangou (CYP); L 0–4	3	did not advance					
Chetan Nathoo	Men's singles	Farley (BAR); L 3 - 4	Reilly (FIJ); W 4 - 0	2	did not advance					
Musfiquh Kalam	Women's singles	Ankude (GHA); W 4 - 1	Cummings (GUY); L 0 - 4	2	did not advance					
Zodwa Maphanga	Women's singles	Thomas Wu Zhang (WAL); L 0–4	Ali (MDV); L 0–4	3	did not advance					
Danisha Patel	Women's singles	Young (JAM); W 4 - 0	Amadi (KEN); W 4 - 0	1 Q	Zhang (CAN); L 0 - 4	did not advance				

Doubles

Athletes	Event	Round of 64	Round of 32	Round of 16	Quarterfinal	Semifinal	Final / BM	
Athletes	Event	Opposition Score	Opposition Score	Opposition Score	Opposition Score	Opposition Score	Opposition Score	Rank
Theo Cogill; Chetan Nathoo	Men's doubles	Bye	Pontoise / Yogarajah (MRI); W 3 - 2	Jarvis / Walker (ENG); L 0 - 3	did not advance			
Kirshwan Steyn; Shaun Jones	Men's doubles	Bye	Maxwell / Knight (BAR); L 1 - 3	did not advance				
Zodwa Maphanga; Danisha Patel	Women's doubles	Bye	Cummings / Edghill (GUY); L 1 - 3	did not advance				
Musfiquh Kalam; Lailaa Edwards	Women's doubles	Bye	Nakhumitsa / Seera (UGA); W 3 - 1	Bello / Edem (NGR); L 0 - 3	did not advance			
Chetan Nathoo; Danisha Patel	Mixed doubles	Bye	Choong / Lyne (MAS); L 0 - 3	did not advance				
Musfiquh Kalam; Shaun Jones	Mixed doubles	Quek / Zhou (SGP); L 0 - 3	did not advance					
Theo Cogill; Zodwa Maphanga	Mixed doubles	Hamza / Sultana (BAN); W WO	Lum / Jee (AUS); L 1 - 3	did not advance				

Team

Athletes	Event	Group Stage				Quarterfinal	Semifinal	Final	Rank
Athletes	Event	Opposition Score	Opposition Score	Opposition Score	Rank	Opposition Score	Opposition Score	Opposition Score	Rank
Theo Cogill; Shaun Jones; Cheetan Nathoo; Kirshwin Steyn	Men's team	Ghana; L 1–3	Cyprus; L 1–3	Nigeria; L 0–3	4	did not advance			
Danisha Patel; Musfiquh Kalam; Lailaa Edwards; Zodwa Maphanga	Women's team	Fiji; W 3–0	Guyana; L 2–3	India; L 0–3	3	did not advance			

== Triathlon ==
Six triathletes and three paratriathletes (plus three guides) were selected as of 8 June 2022. The paratriathletes qualified through the World Triathlon Para Rankings of 28 March 2022.

Individual

Athlete	Event	Swim (750 m)	Trans 1	Bike (20 km)	Trans 2	Run (5 km)	Total	Rank
Henri Schoeman	Men's	did not start						
Jamie Riddle	Men's	8:36	0:51	26:04	0:18	15:43	51:32	6
Dylan Nortje	Men's	8:59	0:54	27:36	0:21	16:22	54:12	21
Simone Ackermann	Women's	9:30	1:00	29:27	0:20	17:02	57:19	8
Shanae Williams	Women's	9:41	1:02	31:08	0:23	18:44	1:00:58	20
Hannah Newman	Women's	10:12	1:02	32:53	0:21	19:40	1:04:08	21

Paratriathlon

Athlete	Event	Comp.	Swim (750 m)	Trans 1	Bike (20 km)	Trans 2	Run (5 km)	Total	Rank
David Jones; Guide: Rohan Kennedy	Men's PTVI	did not start							
Gavin Kilpatrick; Guide: Casper Moodie	Men's PTVI	2:46	14:21	1:26	30:27	0:33	21:46	1:10:07	7
Linsay Engelbrecht; Guide: Trish Heimann	Women's PTVI	3:19	17:41	1:28	34:44	0:39	25:36	1:23:27	5

Mixed Relay

Athletes	Event	Total Times per Athlete (Swim 250 m, Bike 7 km, Run 1.5 km)	Total Group Time	Rank
Jamie Riddle; Simone Ackerman; Henri Schoeman; Shanae Williams	Mixed relay	18:10; 21:41; 19:20; 22:06	1:21:17	8

== Weightlifting ==
South Africa qualified four weightlifters (three men, one woman) via the IWF Commonwealth Ranking List, which was finalised on 9 March 2022.

Men

Athlete	Event	Snatch		Clean & Jerk		Total	Rank
Athlete	Event	Result	Rank	Result	Rank	Total	Rank
Jon-Antohein Phillips	73 kg	118 kg	11	162 kg	6	280 kg	10
Ruben Burger	96 kg	138 kg	8	165 kg	6	303 kg	6
Nathan Morris	+109 kg	141 kg	8	NM		DNF	

Women

Athlete	Event	Snatch		Clean & Jerk		Total	Rank
Athlete	Event	Result	Rank	Result	Rank	Total	Rank
Anneke Spies	59 kg	85 kg	4	105 kg	5	190 kg	4

== Wrestling ==
A squad of four wrestlers was confirmed on 4 July 2022.

Key:

- VT - Victory by Fall.
- PP - Decision by Points - the loser with technical points.
- PO - Decision by Points - the loser without technical points.

Athlete	Event	Round of 16	Quarterfinal	Semifinal	Repechage	Final / BM	
Athlete	Event	Opposition Result	Opposition Result	Opposition Result	Opposition Result	Opposition Result	Rank
Jakobo Tau	Men's -57 kg	Bye	Welson (NGR); L 0–10	Did not advance	Bye	Capellan (CAN); L 2–12	5
Arno van Zijl	Men's -74 kg	Dodge (WAL); W 10–0	Bowling (ENG); L 2–4	did not advance			
Edward Lessing	Men's -86 kg	Tamati (SAM); W 10–0	Eslami (ENG); W 10–0	Inam (PAK); L 3–5	—N/a	Lawrence (AUS); L 11–12	5
Nicolaas de Lange	Men's -97 kg	Bye	Barns (AUS); W 10–0	Alofipo (SAM); W 10–0	—N/a	Randhawa (CAN); L 3–9	2nd place, silver medalist(s)
