= Athletics at the 2022 Commonwealth Games – Men's 400 metres =

Men's 400 metres at the 2022 Commonwealth Games
- Venue: Alexander Stadium
- Dates: 3 August (first round); 5 August (semifinals); 7 August (final)
- Competitors: 48 from 29 nations
- Winning time: 44.66

Medalists
| gold medal | Muzala Samukonga | Zambia |
| silver medal | Matthew Hudson-Smith | England |
| bronze medal | Jonathan Jones | Barbados |

The men's 400 metres at the 2022 Commonwealth Games, as part of the athletics programme, took place in the Alexander Stadium on 3, 5 and 7 August 2022.

== Records ==
Prior to this competition, the existing world and Games records were as follows:

| World record | Wayde van Niekerk (RSA) | 43.03 | Rio de Janeiro, Brazil | 14 August 2016 |
| Commonwealth record | Wayde van Niekerk (RSA) | 43.03 | Rio de Janeiro, Brazil | 14 August 2016 |
| Games record | Kirani James (GRN) | 44.24 | Glasgow, Scotland | 30 July 2014 |

== Schedule ==
The schedule was as follows:

| Date | Time | Round |
|---|---|---|
| Wednesday 3 August 2022 | 12:20 | First round |
| Friday 5 August 2022 | 21:09 | Semifinals |
| Sunday 7 August 2022 | 10:34 | Final |

All times are British Summer Time (UTC+1)

== Results ==
=== First round ===
First 3 in each heat (Q) and the next 3 fastest (q) advance to the Semifinals.

| Rank | Heat | Lane | Name | Nation | Result | Notes |
|---|---|---|---|---|---|---|
| 1 | 5 | 6 | Muzala Samukonga | Zambia | 44.89 | Q, PB |
| 2 | 2 | 6 | Nathon Allen | Jamaica | 45.18 | Q, SB |
| 3 | 1 | 4 | Anthony Cox | Jamaica | 45.51 | Q |
| 4 | 2 | 5 | Leungo Scotch | Botswana | 45.75 | Q |
| 5 | 3 | 2 | Boniface Mweresa | Kenya | 45.91 | Q |
| 6 | 1 | 5 | Steven Solomon | Australia | 45.98 [.972] | Q |
| 7 | 2 | 7 | Asa Guevara | Trinidad and Tobago | 45.98 [.976] | Q |
| 8 | 5 | 7 | Jevaughn Powell | Jamaica | 46.14 | Q |
| 9 | 4 | 3 | Matthew Hudson-Smith | England | 46.26 | Q |
| 10 | 3 | 7 | Samson Oghenewegba Nathaniel | Nigeria | 46.31 | Q |
| 11 | 6 | 4 | Zibane Ngozi | Botswana | 46.34 | Q |
| 12 | 3 | 8 | Michael Francois | Grenada | 46.35 | Q, PB |
| 13 | 6 | 7 | Haron Adoli | Uganda | 46.38 | Q |
| 14 | 7 | 2 | Jonathan Jones | Barbados | 46.39 | Q |
| 15 | 5 | 4 | Alonzo Russell | Bahamas | 46.41 | Q |
| 16 | 1 | 2 | Ivan Geldenhuys | Namibia | 46.51 | Q |
| 17 | 1 | 6 | Kalinga Kumarage | Sri Lanka | 46.53 | q |
| 18 | 7 | 5 | Anthony Pesela | Botswana | 46.55 | Q |
| 19 | 5 | 5 | Sikiru Adeyemi | Nigeria | 46.63 | q |
| 20 | 3 | 4 | Kyle Gale | Barbados | 46.66 | q |
| 21 | 2 | 2 | Mahhad Bock | Namibia | 46.71 | |
| 22 | 7 | 6 | Kennedy Luchembe | Zambia | 46.74 | Q |
| 23 | 4 | 6 | Dubem Amene | Nigeria | 46.77 | Q |
| 24 | 4 | 2 | Joe Brier | Wales | 46.84 | Q |
| 25 | 7 | 7 | Andre Retief | Namibia | 46.95 | |
| 26 | 6 | 8 | Michael Joseph | Saint Lucia | 47.08 [.074] | Q |
| 27 | 7 | 8 | William Rayian | Kenya | 47.08 [.080] | |
| 28 | 2 | 3 | Alford Conteh | Sierra Leone | 47.12 | PB |
| 29 | 1 | 7 | Desroy Jordan | Saint Vincent and the Grenadines | 47.29 | PB |
| 30 | 4 | 5 | Cameron Chalmers | Guernsey | 47.49 | |
| 31 | 1 | 8 | Che Lara | Trinidad and Tobago | 47.51 | |
| 32 | 2 | 8 | Tan Zong Yang | Singapore | 47.55 | |
| 33 | 5 | 8 | Arinze Chance | Guyana | 47.63 | |
| 34 | 6 | 5 | Kashief King | Trinidad and Tobago | 48.08 | |
| 35 | 2 | 4 | Emmanuel Wanga | Papua New Guinea | 48.23 | |
| 36 | 4 | 7 | Aboubakar Tetndap Nsangou | Cameroon | 48.47 | |
| 37 | 5 | 3 | Derick St Jean | Dominica | 48.51 | |
| 38 | 7 | 3 | Thiruben Thana Rajan | Singapore | 48.67 | |
| 39 | 7 | 4 | Edio Mussacate | Mozambique | 48.73 | PB |
| 40 | 4 | 4 | Adriano Gumbs | British Virgin Islands | 48.87 | |
| 41 | 6 | 3 | Adain Peters | Grenada | 48.96 | |
| 42 | 5 | 2 | Farook Mponda | Malawi | 49.12 | =PB |
| 43 | 6 | 2 | Angelo Garland | Turks and Caicos Islands | 49.46 | SB |
| 44 | 4 | 8 | Va-Sheku Sheriff | Sierra Leone | 51.10 | |
| 45 | 1 | 3 | Obediah Timbaci | Vanuatu | 51.62 | SB |
| 46 | 3 | 5 | Ken Reyes | Turks and Caicos Islands | 52.92 | |
| | 6 | 6 | Emmanuel Korir | Kenya | DQ | TR 17.3.1 |
| | 3 | 3 | Shadrick Tansi | Papua New Guinea | DQ | TR 17.3.1 |
| | 3 | 6 | Zakithi Nene | South Africa | DNS | |

=== Semifinals ===
First 2 in each heat (Q) and the next 2 fastest (q) advance to the Final.

| Rank | Heat | Lane | Name | Nation | Result | Notes |
|---|---|---|---|---|---|---|
| 1 | 3 | 6 | Matthew Hudson-Smith | England | 45.77 | Q |
| 2 | 1 | 7 | Haron Adoli | Uganda | 45.80 | Q, PB |
| 3 | 2 | 7 | Jonathan Jones | Barbados | 45.82 | Q |
| 4 | 1 | 4 | Boniface Mweresa | Kenya | 45.85 | Q |
| 5 | 1 | 5 | Anthony Cox | Jamaica | 45.98 | q |
| 6 | 3 | 5 | Nathon Allen | Jamaica | 45.99 | Q |
| 7 | 2 | 6 | Muzala Samukonga | Zambia | 46.06 | Q |
| 8 | 1 | 6 | Steven Solomon | Australia | 46.30 | q |
| 9 | 3 | 7 | Leungo Scotch | Botswana | 46.33 | |
| 10 | 3 | 9 | Alonzo Russell | Bahamas | 46.40 [.392] | |
| 11 | 2 | 4 | Jevaughn Powell | Jamaica | 46.40 [.400] | |
| 12 | 3 | 8 | Asa Guevara | Trinidad and Tobago | 46.46 | |
| 13 | 2 | 8 | Ivan Geldenhuys | Namibia | 46.68 | |
| 14 | 1 | 2 | Kyle Gale | Barbados | 46.78 | |
| 15 | 3 | 4 | Samson Oghenewegba Nathaniel | Nigeria | 47.00 [.993] | |
| 16 | 3 | 2 | Kalinga Kumarage | Sri Lanka | 47.00 [.997] | |
| 17 | 1 | 3 | Michael Joseph | Saint Lucia | 47.03 | |
| 18 | 2 | 5 | Zibane Ngozi | Botswana | 47.06 | |
| 19 | 3 | 3 | Kennedy Luchembe | Zambia | 47.22 | |
| 20 | 2 | 2 | Sikiru Adeyemi | Nigeria | 47.40 | |
| 21 | 2 | 9 | Michael Francois | Grenada | 47.45 | |
| 22 | 2 | 3 | Joe Brier | Wales | 47.50 | |
| 23 | 1 | 8 | Anthony Pesela | Botswana | 47.63 | |
| | 1 | 9 | Dubem Amene | Nigeria | DNF | |

=== Final ===
The medals were determined in the final.

| Rank | Lane | Name | Result | Notes |
|---|---|---|---|---|
| 1st place, gold medalist(s) | 8 | Muzala Samukonga (ZAM) | 44.66 | NR |
| 2nd place, silver medalist(s) | 7 | Matthew Hudson-Smith (ENG) | 44.81 | |
| 3rd place, bronze medalist(s) | 5 | Jonathan Jones (BAR) | 44.89 | |
| 4 | 6 | Boniface Mweresa (KEN) | 44.96 | PB |
| 5 | 4 | Haron Adoli (UGA) | 45.62 | PB |
| 6 | 2 | Anthony Cox (JAM) | 46.17 | |
| 7 | 3 | Steven Solomon (AUS) | 46.22 | |
| 8 | 9 | Nathon Allen (JAM) | 48.00 | |
