= Cameroon at the 2022 Commonwealth Games =

- Flag of Cameroon
- CG code: CMR
- CGA: Cameroon Olympic and Sports Committee
- Website: cnosc.org (in French)

in Birmingham, England 28 July 2022 – 8 August 2022
- Competitors: 35 (17 men and 18 women) in 9 sports
- Flag bearers: Emmanuel Eseme; Ayuk Otay Arrey Sophina
- Medals Ranked =20th: Gold 1 Silver 1 Bronze 1 Total 3

Commonwealth Games appearances (overview)
- 1998; 2002; 2006; 2010; 2014; 2018; 2022; 2026; 2030

Cameroon competed at the 2022 Commonwealth Games at Birmingham, England from 28 July to 8 August 2022. It was their seventh appearance at the Commonwealth Games.

The Cameroon team consisted of 37 athletes.

Athlete Emmanuel Eseme and judoka Ayuk Otay Arrey Sophina were the country's flagbearers during the opening ceremony.

== Medalists ==
Medal	Name	Sport	Event	Date
Gold	Junior Ngadja Nyabeyeu	Weightlifting	Men's 109 kg	3 August
Silver	Arlette Mawe Fokoa	Athletics	Women's shot put (F57)	6 August
Bronze	Berthe Etane Ngolle	Wrestling	Women's freestyle 62 kg	5 August

== Competitors ==
The following is the list of number of competitors participating at the Games per sport/discipline.

Sport	Men	Women	Total
Athletics	5	3	8
Badminton	1	1	2
Boxing	3	1	4
Judo	2	3	5
Powerlifting	2	2	4
Swimming	1	1	2
Table tennis	0	1	1
Weightlifting	3	2	5
Wrestling	0	4	4
Total	17	18	35

== Athletics ==
Men
Track and road events

Athlete	Event	Heat		Semifinal		Final	
Athlete	Event	Result	Rank	Result	Rank	Result	Rank
Emmanuel Eseme	100 m	10.08	2 Q	10.14	2 Q	10.24	7
Raphael Ngaguele Mberlina	100 m	DQ		Did not advance			
Guillaume Atangana	100 m (T12)	11.46	3	—N/a		Did not advance	
Emmanuel Eseme	200 m	20.44	2 Q	20.69	6 Q	20.61	4
Raphael Ngaguele Mberlina	200 m	21.07	35	Did not advance			
Aboubakar Tetndap Nsangou	400 m	48.47	36	Did not advance			

Field events

Athlete	Event	Qualification		Final	
Athlete	Event	Distance	Rank	Distance	Rank
Appolinaire Yinra	Long jump	7.45	14	Did not advance	

Women
Track and road events

Athlete	Event	Heat		Semifinal		Final	
Athlete	Event	Result	Rank	Result	Rank	Result	Rank
Linda Angounou	200 m	24.14	21 q	24.32	21	Did not advance	
Linda Angounou	400 m hurdles	58.50	9	—N/a		Did not advance	

Field events

Athlete	Event	Final	
Athlete	Event	Distance	Rank
Veronique Kossenda Rey	Triple jump	12.46	13
Arlette Mawe Fokoa	Shot put (F57)	9.38 PB	2nd place, silver medalist(s)

== Badminton ==
Athlete	Event	Round of 64	Round of 32	Round of 16	Quarterfinal	Semifinal	Final / BM	
Athlete	Event	Opposition Score	Opposition Score	Opposition Score	Opposition Score	Opposition Score	Opposition Score	Rank
Michel Assembe	Men's singles	Bye	Bongout (MRI); L 0 - 2	Did not advance				
Madeleine Akoumba Ze	Women's singles	Kattirtzi (CYP); L 0 - 2	Did not advance					

== Boxing ==
Men

Athlete	Event	Round of 32	Round of 16	Quarterfinals	Semifinals	Final	
Athlete	Event	Opposition Result	Opposition Result	Opposition Result	Opposition Result	Opposition Result	Rank
Jean Marie Onana Ngah	Welterweight	Bye	Mata'afa-Ikinofo (NIU); L 1 - 4	Did not advance			
Albert Mengue Ayissi	Light middleweight	Newns (SCO); W 3 - 2	Muxanga (MOZ); L 0 - 5	Did not advance			
Maxime Yegnong Njieyo	Super heavyweight	—N/a	Ahlawat (IND); L 0 - 5	Did not advance			

Women

Athlete	Event	Round of 16	Quarterfinals	Semifinals	Final	
Athlete	Event	Opposition Result	Opposition Result	Opposition Result	Opposition Result	Rank
Clotilde Essiane	Light middleweight	Gittens (BAR); W 5 - 0	Panguana (MOZ); L 2 - 3	Did not advance		

== Judo ==
Athlete	Event	Round of 32	Round of 16	Quarterfinals	Semifinals	Repechage	Final/BM	
Athlete	Event	Opposition Result	Opposition Result	Opposition Result	Opposition Result	Opposition Result	Opposition Result	Rank
Bernadin Tsala Tsala	Men's -60 kg	Bye	Christodoulides (CYP); L 01 - 10	Did not advance				9
Eric Omgba Fouda	Men's -100 kg	—N/a	Deswal (IND); L 00 - 10	Did not advance				9
Marie Céline Baba Matia	Women's -52 kg	—N/a	Bye	Ferreira (MOZ); W 01 - 00	Deguchi (CAN); L 00 - 11	—N/a	Griesel (RSA); L 00 - 11	5
Audrey Etoua Biock	Women's -63 kg	—N/a	Bye	Semple (JAM); W 11 - 00	B-Pinard (CAN); L 00 - 10	—N/a	H-Jones (WAL); L 01 - 10	5
Ayuk Otay Arrey Sophina	Women's -78 kg	—N/a	—N/a	Godbout (CAN); L 00 - 01	Did not advance	Agathe (MRI); W 10 - 00	de Villiers (NZL); L 00 - 10	5

== Para powerlifting ==
Athlete	Event	Result	Rank
Conrat Atangana	Men's lightweight	122.8	7
Oscar Makoube Moussima	Men's heavyweight	59.5	8
Suzanne Menye Meto	Women's lightweight	80.3	6
Thamar Mengue	Women's heavyweight	85.6	4

== Swimming ==
Men

Athlete	Event	Heat		Semifinal		Final	
Athlete	Event	Time	Rank	Time	Rank	Time	Rank
Charly Ndjoume	50 m freestyle	27.39	63	Did not advance			
Charly Ndjoume	50 m butterfly	30.28	53	Did not advance			

Women

Athlete	Event	Heat		Semifinal		Final	
Athlete	Event	Time	Rank	Time	Rank	Time	Rank
Norah Milanesi	50 m freestyle	27.13	26	Did not advance			
Norah Milanesi	100 m freestyle	59.06	29	Did not advance			
Norah Milanesi	50 m butterfly	28.53	28	Did not advance			

== Table tennis ==
Athletes	Event	Group stage				Round of 32	Round of 16	Quarterfinal	Semifinal	Final / BM	
Athletes	Event	Opposition Score	Opposition Score	Opposition Score	Rank	Opposition Score	Opposition Score	Opposition Score	Opposition Score	Opposition Score	Rank
Sarah Hanffou	Women's singles	Bye				Thomas (WAL); L 2 - 4	Did not advance				

== Weightlifting ==
Junior Ngadja Nyabeyeu qualified for the competition by winning gold at the 2021 Commonwealth Weightlifting Championships in Tashkent, Uzbekistan.

Athlete	Event	Weight Lifted		Total	Rank
Athlete	Event	Snatch	Clean & jerk	Total	Rank
Guy Ngongang Tchuissi	Men's -81 kg	139	NM	DNF	
Denis Essama Owona	Men's -96 kg	145	180	325	4
Junior Ngadja Nyabeyeu	Men's 109 kg	160	201	361	1st place, gold medalist(s)
Jeanne Gaelle Eyenga Mboosi	Women's -76 kg	90	122	212	5
Clementine Meukeugni Noumbissi	Women's -87 kg	100	121	221	4

== Wrestling ==
Key:

- VT - Victory by Fall.
- PP - Decision by Points - the loser with technical points.
- PO - Decision by Points - the loser without technical points.

Repechage Format

Athlete	Event	Round of 16	Quarterfinal	Semifinal	Repechage	Final / BM	
Athlete	Event	Opposition Result	Opposition Result	Opposition Result	Opposition Result	Opposition Result	Rank
Joseph Essombe	Women's -57 kg	Bye	Poruthotage (SRI); L WO	Did not advance			DSQ
Berthe Etane Ngolle	Women's -62 kg	—N/a	Khatun (BAN); W 10 - 0	Malik (IND); L 0 - 10	—N/a	Barnes (ENG); W 9 - 4	3rd place, bronze medalist(s)
Blandine Ngiri	Women's -68 kg	Oborududu (NGR); L 0 - 10	Did not advance		Kakran (IND); L 0 - 4	Did not advance	9

Group stage Format

Athlete	Event	Group stage			Semifinal	Final / BM	
Athlete	Event	Opposition Result	Opposition Result	Rank	Opposition Result	Opposition Result	Rank
Rebecca Muambo	Women's -50 kg	Gehlot (IND); L VFO	Letchidjio (SCO); L VFO	3	Did not advance		
