= Athletics at the 2022 Commonwealth Games – Men's 100 metres (T12) =

Men's 100 metres (T12) at the 2022 Commonwealth Games
- Venue: Alexander Stadium
- Dates: 3 August (first round); 4 August (final)
- Competitors: 8 from 7 nations
- Winning time: 10.83

Medalists
gold medal	Jonathan Ntutu	South Africa
silver medal	Zac Shaw	England
bronze medal	Ananias Shikongo	Namibia

The Men's 100 metres (T12) at the 2022 Commonwealth Games, as part of the athletics programme, took place in the Alexander Stadium on 3 and 4 August 2022.

== Records ==
Prior to this competition, the existing world and Games records were as follows:

Records T11
World record	Athanasios Ghavelas (GRE)	10.82	Tokyo, Japan	2 September 2021
Games record	Ananias Shikongo (NAM)	11.26	Gold Coast, Australia	12 April 2018
Records T12
World record	Salum Ageze Kashafali (NOR)	10.43	Tokyo, Japan	29 August 2021
Games record	Jonathan Ntutu (RSA)	10.80	Gold Coast, Australia	12 April 2018

== Schedule ==
The schedule was as follows:

Date	Time	Round
Wednesday 3 August 2022	12:02	First round
Thursday 4 August 2022	20:10	Final

All times are British Summer Time (UTC+1)

== Results ==
=== First round ===
As the T12 was a combined class race, and T11 competitors' guides are allowed in the class, a maximum of four athletes can take part in each of two heats and the final.

First in each heat (Q) and the next 2 fastest (q) advance to the Final.

==== Heat 1 ====
Rank	Lane	Athlete	Nation	Sport class	Time	Notes
1	3	Jonathan Ntutu	South Africa	T12	10.89	Q, SB
2	7	Ananias Shikongo; Guide: Even Tjiuiju	Namibia	T11	11.12	q, GR, SB
3	5	Afiq Hanafiah	Malaysia	T12	11.29	q, SB
4	1	David Johnson	Canada	T12	11.80	
					Wind: +0.2 m/s	

==== Heat 2 ====
Rank	Lane	Athlete	Nation	Sport class	Time	Notes
1	5	Zac Shaw	England	T12	11.01	Q
2	1	Jaco Smit	South Africa	T12	11.32	
3	7	Guillaume Atangana; Guide: Donard Ndim Nyamjua	Cameroon	T11	11.46	
4	3	Fred Masisa	Uganda	T11	12.26	PB
					Wind: +0.8 m/s	

=== Final ===
The medals were determined in the final.

Rank	Lane	Athlete	Nation	Sport class	Time	Notes
1st place, gold medalist(s)	3	Jonathan Ntutu	South Africa	T12	10.83	
2nd place, silver medalist(s)	5	Zac Shaw	England	T12	10.90	
3rd place, bronze medalist(s)	7	Ananias Shikongo; Guide: Even Tjiuiju	Namibia	T12	10.95	
4	1	Afiq Hanafiah	Malaysia	T12	11.10	
					Wind: +3.7 m/s	
