= Rosemary Lenton =

Scottish para-bowler and wheelchair curler

Personal information
- Born: 21 August 1949 (age 76) Huddersfield, Yorkshire, England

Sport
- Country: Scotland
- Sport: Bowls
Medal record
Commonwealth Games
Gold medal – first place	2022 Birmingham	Women's pairs B6–8

Rosemary Lenton (born 21 August 1949) is a Scottish para lawn bowler and wheelchair curler.

== Life and career ==
Lenton was born in Huddersfield, Yorkshire on 21 August 1949. She has previously competed in sailing and cycling. Complications after routine surgery in 2002 led to her using a wheelchair. She took up bowls in 2005.

She competed at the 2022 Commonwealth Games where she won a gold medal in the Women's pairs B6–8 event alongside Pauline Wilson and became Scotland's oldest Commonwealth Games medallist. She has also competed at the World Bowls Championships 3 times, winning a silver medal in New Zealand in 2015.

As well as lawn bowls Lenton has also competed nine times at the World Wheelchair Curling Championships.
