= Badminton at the 2022 Commonwealth Games – Men's singles =

Badminton – Men's singles at the 2022 Commonwealth Games
- Venue: National Exhibition Centre, Solihull
- Dates: 3–8 August
- Competitors: 46 from 24 nations

Medalists
gold medal	Lakshya Sen	India
silver medal	Ng Tze Yong	Malaysia
bronze medal	Srikanth Kidambi	India

The men's singles badminton event at the 2022 Commonwealth Games was held from 3 to 8 August 2022 at the National Exhibition Centre on the Solihull, England. The defending gold medalist, Lee Chong Wei of Malaysia, had retired in 2019, so he didn't participate in the event.

The athletes were drawn into straight knockout stage. The draw for the competition was conducted on 28 July 2022.

== Seeds ==
The seeds for the tournament were:

1. Loh Kean Yew (SGP) (quarter-finals)
2. Lakshya Sen (IND) (champion, Gold medalist)
3. Srikanth Kidambi (IND) (semi-finals, Bronze medalist)
4. Brian Yang (CAN) (second round)

5. Ng Tze Yong (MAS) (final, silver medalist)
6. Toby Penty (ENG) (quarter-finals)
7. Jason Teh (SGP) (semi-finals, Fourth place)
8. Julien Paul (MRI) (quarter-finals)

Click on the seed number of a player to go to their draw section.

== Results ==
=== Finals ===
Semi-finals
5	Ng Tze Yong (MAS)	13	21	21
3	Srikanth Kidambi (IND)	21	19	10
7	Jason Teh (SGP)	10	21	16
2	Lakshya Sen (IND)	21	18	21

Gold medal match
5	Ng Tze Yong (MAS)	21	9	16
2	Lakshya Sen (IND)	19	21	21
Bronze medal match
3	Srikanth Kidambi (IND)	21	21
7	Jason Teh (SGP)	15	18

=== Top half ===
==== Section 1 ====
First Round
Joel Angus (JAM)	9	12
Alexandre Bongout (MRI)	21	21
Muhammad Irfan Saeed Bhatti (PAK)	21	21
Chongo Mulenga (ZAM)	6	19
Abdul Bangura (SLE)	1	1
Ahmad Abdul-Samad (GHA)	21	21

Second Round
1	Loh Kean Yew (SGP)	21	21
Robert Summers (RSA)	16	9
Michel Henri Assembe (CMR)	7	6
Alexandre Bongout (MRI)	21	21
5	Ng Tze Yong (MAS)	21	21
Muhammad Irfan Saeed Bhatti (PAK)	10	9
Ajfan Rasheed (MDV)	21	21
Ahmad Abdul-Samad (GHA)	16	14

Third Round
1	Loh Kean Yew (SGP)	21	21
Alexandre Bongout (MRI)	13	10
5	Ng Tze Yong (MAS)	21	21
Ajfan Rasheed (MDV)	7	9

Quarter-finals
1	Loh Kean Yew (SGP)	21	14	11
5	Ng Tze Yong (MAS)	15	21	21

==== Section 2 ====
First Round
Daniel Wanagaliya (UGA)	21	21
Kennie Maarten King (BAR)	13	10
Aatish Lubah (MRI)	7	22	11
Dumindu Abeywickrama (SRI)	21	20	21
Nathan Tang (AUS)	21	21
Sammy Mdogo Sikoyo (KEN)	10	13
Duane March (FLK)	3	4
Callum Smith (SCO)	21	21

Second Round
3	Srikanth Kidambi (IND)	21	21
Daniel Wanagaliya (UGA)	9	9
Samuel Cassar (MLT)	12	20
Dumindu Abeywickrama (SRI)	21	22
6	Toby Penty (ENG)	21	21
Nathan Tang (AUS)	11	7
Kelvin Alphous (GHA)	6	7
Callum Smith (SCO)	21	21

Third Round
3	Srikanth Kidambi (IND)	21	21
Dumindu Abeywickrama (SRI)	9	12
6	Toby Penty (ENG)	25	21
Callum Smith (SCO)	23	12

Quarter-finals
3	Srikanth Kidambi (IND)	21	21
6	Toby Penty (ENG)	19	17

=== Bottom half ===
==== Section 3 ====
First Round
Niluka Karunaratne (SRI)	21	21
Friday Attama (UGA)	6	6
Murad Ali (PAK)	21	21
Aaron Tamakloe (GHA)	9	8
Doug Clark (FLK)	10	11
Ahmed Nibal (MDV)	21	21
Jacob Schueler (AUS)	19	15
Samuel Ricketts (JAM)	21	21

Second Round
Niluka Karunaratne (SRI)	21	21
Shae Martin (BAR)	6	5
Murad Ali (PAK)	14	16
7	Jason Teh (SGP)	21	21
Ahmed Nibal (MDV)	21	21
Ibrahim Conteh (SLE)	4	3
Samuel Ricketts (JAM)	w	/	o
4	Brian Yang (CAN)

Third Round
Niluka Karunaratne (SRI)	13	11
7	Jason Teh (SGP)	21	21
Ahmed Nibal (MDV)	9	6
Samuel Ricketts (JAM)	21	21

Quarter-finals
7	Jason Teh (SGP)	22	21
Samuel Ricketts (JAM)	20	10

==== Section 4 ====
First Round
Zayan Zaki (MDV)	16	8
Kalombo Mulenga (ZAM)	21	21
Ben Chater (FLK)	10	8
Caden Kakora (RSA)	21	21
Matthew Abela (MLT)	16	9
Yingxiang Lin (AUS)	21	21

Second Round
Kalombo Mulenga (ZAM)	21	14	21
Brian Kasirye (UGA)	19	21	14
Caden Kakora (RSA)	6	21	3
8	Julien Paul (MRI)	21	18	21
Yingxiang Lin (AUS)	21	21
Narayan Ramdhani (GUY)	12	8
Vernon Smeed (SHN)	4	5
2	Lakshya Sen (IND)	21	21

Third Round
Kalombo Mulenga (ZAM)	9	11
8	Julien Paul (MRI)	21	21
Yingxiang Lin (AUS)	9	16
2	Lakshya Sen (IND)	21	21

Quarter-finals
8	Julien Paul (MRI)	12	11
2	Lakshya Sen (IND)	21	21
