= Athletics at the 2022 Commonwealth Games – Women's 400 metres hurdles =

Hurdling at the 2022 Commonwealth games

Women's 400 metres hurdles at the 2022 Commonwealth Games
- Venue: Alexander Stadium
- Dates: 4 August (first round); 6 August (final)
- Competitors: 11 from 8 nations
- Winning time: 54.14

Medalists
gold medal	Janieve Russell	Jamaica
silver medal	Shiann Salmon	Jamaica
bronze medal	Zenéy van der Walt	South Africa

The women's 400 metres hurdles at the 2022 Commonwealth Games, as part of the athletics programme, took place in the Alexander Stadium on 4 and 6 August 2022.

The winning margin was 0.33 seconds which as of 2024 is the narrowest winning margin for the women's 400 metres hurdles at these games.

== Records ==
Prior to this competition, the existing world and Games records were as follows:

World record	Sydney McLaughlin (USA)	50.68	Eugene, United States	22 July 2022
Commonwealth record	Melaine Walker (JAM)	52.42	Berlin, Germany	20 August 2009
Games record	Jana Pittman (AUS)	53.82	Melbourne, Australia	23 March 2006

== Schedule ==
The schedule was as follows:

Date	Time	Round
Thursday 4 August 2022	19:38	First round
Saturday 6 August 2022	19:30	Final

All times are British Summer Time (UTC+1)

== Results ==
=== First round ===
The first round consisted of two heats. The three fastest competitors per heat (plus two fastest non-automatic qualifiers) advanced to the final.

Rank	Heat	Lane	Name	Result	Notes
1	2	6	Rushell Clayton (JAM)	54.93	Q
2	2	3	Zenéy van der Walt (RSA)	55.10	Q
3	1	6	Shiann Salmon (JAM)	55.30	Q
4	1	3	Janieve Russell (JAM)	55.79	Q
5	2	5	Jessie Knight (ENG)	55.88	Q
6	2	7	Sarah Carli (AUS)	56.10	q
7	1	4	Portia Bing (NZL)	56.32	Q
8	1	5	Yanique Haye-Smith (TCA)	58.20	q
9	1	7	Linda Angounou (CMR)	58.50	
10	2	4	Noelle Montcalm (CAN)	58.68	
11	1	8	Lina Nielsen (ENG)	58.95	

=== Final ===
The medals were determined in the final.

Rank	Lane	Name	Result	Notes
1st place, gold medalist(s)	7	Janieve Russell (JAM)	54.14	
2nd place, silver medalist(s)	4	Shiann Salmon (JAM)	54.47(.462)	
3rd place, bronze medalist(s)	6	Zenéy van der Walt (RSA)	54.47(.464)	PB
4	5	Rushell Clayton (JAM)	54.67	
5	8	Jessie Knight (ENG)	55.11	
6	2	Sarah Carli (AUS)	55.82	
7	9	Portia Bing (NZL)	56.36	
8	3	Yanique Haye-Smith (TCA)	58.78	
