= Athletics at the 2022 Commonwealth Games – Men's long jump =

Men's long jump at the 2022 Commonwealth Games
- Venue: Alexander Stadium
- Dates: 2 August (qualifying round); 4 August (final)
- Competitors: 20 from 16 nations
- Winning distance: 8.08 m

Medalists
gold medal	LaQuan Nairn	Bahamas
silver medal	Murali Sreeshankar	India
bronze medal	Jovan van Vuuren	South Africa

The men's long jump at the 2022 Commonwealth Games, as part of the athletics programme, took place in the Alexander Stadium on 2 and 4 August 2022.

For the third time, the gold and silver medallists achieved the same distance in this competition. The previous two occasions occurred in 1958 and 1998.

== Records ==
Prior to this competition, the existing world and Games records were as follows:

World record	Mike Powell (USA)	8.95 m	Tokyo, Japan	30 August 1991
Commonwealth record	Tajay Gayle (JAM)	8.69 m	Doha, Qatar	28 September 2019
Games record	Luvo Manyonga (RSA)	8.41 m	Gold Coast, Australia	11 April 2018

== Schedule ==
The schedule was as follows:

Date	Time	Round
Tuesday 2 August 2022	10:00	Qualification
Thursday 4 August 2022	19:42	Final

All times are British Summer Time (UTC+1)

== Results ==
=== Qualifying round ===
Across two groups, those who jumped ≥8.00 m (Q) or at least the 12 best performers (q) advanced to the final.

Rank	Group	Name	#1	#2	#3	Result	Notes	Qual.
1	A	Murali Sreeshankar (IND)	8.05 +2.7 m/s			8.05 +2.7 m/s		Q
2	A	LaQuan Nairn (BAH)	7.80 +0.8 m/s	7.30 -4.0 m/s	7.90 -1.2 m/s	7.90 -1.2 m/s		q
3	A	Jovan van Vuuren (RSA)	7.87 -3.1 m/s	7.41 -0.8 m/s	× +0.8 m/s	7.87 -3.1 m/s		q
4	A	Shawn-D Thompson (JAM)	7.85 -0.6 m/s	× +2.0 m/s	7.77 +0.5 m/s	7.85 -0.6 m/s		q
5	A	Henry Frayne (AUS)	7.85 +2.2 m/s	―	―	7.85 +2.2 m/s		q
6	B	Emanuel Archibald (GUY)	7.59 +0.7 m/s	7.63 -2.0 m/s	7.83 +0.4 m/s	7.83 +0.4 m/s		q
7	B	Christopher Mitrevski (AUS)	7.10 -3.2 m/s	7.41 -1.0 m/s	7.76 -1.0 m/s	7.76 -1.0 m/s		q
8	B	Muhammed Yahiya (IND)	7.49; 0 m/s	7.68 -0.2 m/s	7.49 -3.8 m/s	7.68 -0.2 m/s		q
9	A	Tristan James (DMA)	7.65 +0.3 m/s	7.62 +1.8 m/s	7.44 -1.7 m/s	7.65 +0.3 m/s		q
10	A	Ifeanyichukwu Otuonye (TCA)	7.53 +0.5 m/s	7.49 -1.1 m/s	7.65 +0.6 m/s	7.65 +0.6 m/s	SB	q
11	B	Thapelo Monaiwa (BOT)	7.47 -1.8 m/s	7.65 -0.9 m/s	7.31 -1.3 m/s	7.65 -0.9 m/s		q
12	A	Andwuelle Wright (TTO)	7.58 -1.8 m/s	7.22 -2.4 m/s	7.41; 0.0 m/s	7.58 -1.8 m/s		q
13	B	Kelsey Daniel (TTO)	× +0.4 m/s	7.49 -2.1 m/s	× -1.0 m/s	7.49 -2.1 m/s	SB	
14	B	Appolinaire Yinra (CMR)	× -0.1 m/s	7.26 +1.3 m/s	7.45 -0.6 m/s	7.45 -0.6 m/s		
15	A	Louis Gordon (CAY)	7.43 -0.5 m/s	7.30 -0.5 m/s	7.36 -1.2 m/s	7.43 -0.5 m/s		
16	B	Kizan David (SKN)	7.00 -2.1 m/s	× -2.0 m/s	5.35 +0.4 m/s	7.00 -2.1 m/s		
17	B	Kelvin Masoe (SAM)	5.39 -4.3 m/s	6.62 +1.1 m/s	6.75 +0.2 m/s	6.75 +0.2 m/s	SB	
	A	Brandon Jones (BIZ)	× -1.1 m/s	× -2.5 m/s	× -0.1 m/s	NM		
	B	Cheswell Johnson (RSA)	DNS					
	B	Elstrom Wanemut (VAN)	DNS					

=== Final ===
The medals were determined in the final.

Rank	Name	#1	#2	#3	#4	#5	#6	Result	Notes
1st place, gold medalist(s)	LaQuan Nairn (BAH)	7.94	8.08	x	x	7.84	7.98	8.08	
2nd place, silver medalist(s)	Murali Sreeshankar (IND)	7.60 w	7.84	7.84	x	8.08	x	8.08	
3rd place, bronze medalist(s)	Jovan van Vuuren (RSA)	7.92	8.06	7.83	7.49	7.75	x	8.06	
4	Shawn-D Thompson (JAM)	7.62	x	8.05	7.75	7.73	7.70	8.05	SB
5	Muhammed Yahiya (IND)	x	7.65	7.72	7.74	7.58	7.97	7.97	
6	Henry Frayne (AUS)	7.89	x	x	x	7.94	x	7.94	
7	Tristan James (DMA)	7.85	7.79	x	x	7.80	7.69	7.85	
8	Ifeanyichukwu Otuonye (TCA)	7.53	7.80	x	7.65	7.52	7.67	7.80	SB
9	Christopher Mitrevski (AUS)	6.25 w	7.57	7.70				7.70	
10	Andwuelle Wright (TTO)	7.57 w	x	6.86				7.57	
11	Emanuel Archibald (GUY)	7.54	7.24	7.41				7.54	
12	Thapelo Monaiwa (BOT)	x	7.37	x				7.37	
