= Turks and Caicos Islands at the 2022 Commonwealth Games =

- Flag of the Turks and Caicos Islands
- CGF code: TCA
- CGA: Turks and Caicos Islands Commonwealth Games Association

in Birmingham, England 28 July 2022 – 8 August 2022
- Competitors: 11 (8 men and 3 women)
- Flag bearers (opening): Courtney Missick; Arleigha Hall
- Flag bearer (closing): TBD
- Medals: Gold 0 Silver 0 Bronze 0 Total 0

Commonwealth Games appearances (overview)
- 1978; 1982–1994; 1998; 2002; 2006; 2010; 2014; 2018; 2022; 2026; 2030

The Turks and Caicos Islands was represented at the 2022 Commonwealth Games in Birmingham, England, United Kingdom by the Turks and Caicos Islands Commonwealth Games Association.

In total, 11 athletes including eight men and three women represented the Turks and Caicos Islands in three different sports including athletics, cycling, and swimming.

Athlete Courtney Missick and swimmer Arleigha Hall were the country's flagbearers during the opening ceremony.

== Competitors ==
In total, 11 athletes represented Turks and Caicos Islands at the 2022 Commonwealth Games in Birmingham, England, United Kingdom across three different sports.

Sport	Men	Women	Total
Athletics	5	2	7
Cycling	2	0	2
Swimming	1	1	2
Total	8	3	11

== Athletics ==
In total, seven Turks and Caicos Islander athletes participated in the athletics events – Wilkinson Fenelon in the men's 100 m, the men's 4 × 100 m relay and the men's 4 × 400 m relay, Courtney Missick in the men's 100 m and the men's 4 × 100 m relay, Angelo Garland in the men's 400 m, the men's 4 × 100 m relay and the men's 4 × 400 m relay, Ken Reyes in the men's 400 m and the men's 4 × 400 m relay, Ifeanyichukwu Otuonye in the men's 4 × 100 m relay, the men's 4 × 400 m relay and the men's long jump, Rebecca Bernardin in the women's 800 m and Yanique Haye-Smith in the women's 400 m hurdles.

The athletics events took place at Alexander Stadium in Perry Bar, Birmingham between 30 July and 7 August 2022.

Men
Track and road events

Athlete	Event	Heat		Semifinal		Final	
Athlete	Event	Result	Rank	Result	Rank	Result	Rank
Wilkinson Fenelon	100 m	11.13	8	Did not advance			
Courtney Missick	100 m	10.87	5	Did not advance			
Angelo Garland	400 m	49.46	6	Did not advance			
Ken Reyes	400 m	52.92	6	Did not advance			
Courtney Missick; Ifeanyichukwu Otuonye; Angelo Garland; Wilkinson Fenelon	4 × 100 m relay	41.17	5	—N/a		Did not advance	
Angelo Garland; Ifeanyichukwu Otuonye; Wilkinson Fenelon; Ken Reyes	4 × 400 m relay	3:22.53	5	—N/a		Did not advance	

Field events

Athlete	Event	Qualification		Final	
Athlete	Event	Distance	Rank	Distance	Rank
Ifeanyichukwu Otuonye	Long jump	7.65	10 q	7.80	8

Women
Track and road events

Athlete	Event	Heat		Final	
Athlete	Event	Result	Rank	Result	Rank
Rebecca Bernardin	800 m	2:25.83	6	Did not advance	
Yanique Haye-Smith	400 m hurdles	58.20	4 q	58.78	8

== Cycling ==
In total, two Turks and Caicos Islander athletes participated in the cycling events – Sean Rodgers and De'vaughn Williams in the men's road race.

The men's road race took place at Myton Fields in Warwick on 7 August 2022.

Athlete	Event	Time	Rank
Sean Rodgers	Road race	DNF	
De'vaughn Williams	Road race	DNF	

== Swimming ==
In total, two Turks and Caicos Islander athletes participated in the swimming events – Rohan Shearer in the men's 50 m freestyle, the men's 100 m freestyle, the men's 50 m backstroke and the men's 100 m backstroke and Arleigha Hall in the women's 50 m freestyle, the women's 50 m backstroke and the women's 50 m butterfly.

The swimming events took place at the Sandwell Aquatics Centre in Londonderry, Smethwick between 29 July and 3 August 2022.

Athlete	Event	Heat		Semifinal		Final	
Athlete	Event	Time	Rank	Time	Rank	Time	Rank
Rohan Shearer	Men's 50 m freestyle	25.64	57	Did not advance			
Rohan Shearer	Men's 100 m freestyle	56.78	62	Did not advance			
Rohan Shearer	Men's 50 m backstroke	28.69	37	Did not advance			
Rohan Shearer	Men's 100 m backstroke	1:03.16	33	Did not advance			
Arleigha Hall	Women's 50 m freestyle	29.45	58	Did not advance			
Arleigha Hall	Women's 50 m backstroke	34.20	34	Did not advance			
Arleigha Hall	Women's 50 m butterfly	32.12	47	Did not advance			
