= Judo at the 2022 Commonwealth Games – Women's 63 kg =

Judo competition

Judo – Women's 63 kg at the 2022 Commonwealth Games
- Venue: Coventry Arena
- Dates: 2 August 2022
- Competitors: 9 from 9 nations

Medalists
gold medal	Catherine Beauchemin-Pinard	Canada
silver medal	Gemma Howell	England
bronze medal	Katharina Haecker	Australia
bronze medal	Jasmine Hacker-Jones	Wales

The women's 63 kg judo competitions at the 2022 Commonwealth Games in Birmingham, England took place on August 2 at the Coventry Arena. A total of nine competitors from nine nations took part.

== Results ==
The draw is as follows:

Round of 16
Cecilia Chineye James (NGR)	10
Taonga Soko (ZAM)	00

Quarter-finals
Catherine Beauchemin-Pinard (CAN)	10 (yellow card)
Cynthia Rahming (BAH)	00 (yellow card)
Audrey Etoua Biock (CMR)	11
Lauren Semple (JAM)	00
Katharina Haecker (AUS)	10
Cecilia Chineye James (NGR)	00
Gemma Howell (ENG)	10
Jasmine Hacker-Jones (WAL)	00

Semi-finals
Catherine Beauchemin-Pinard (CAN)	10
Audrey Etoua Biock (CMR)	00
Katharina Haecker (AUS)	00
Gemma Howell (ENG)	10 (yellow card)

Final
Catherine Beauchemin-Pinard (CAN)	10
Gemma Howell (ENG)	00

=== Repechages ===
Repechage
Cynthia Rahming (BAH)	00
Lauren Semple (JAM)	10
Cecilia Chineye James (NGR)	0
Jasmine Hacker-Jones (WAL)	10

Bronze medal
Lauren Semple (JAM)	00
Katharina Haecker (AUS)	10
Jasmine Hacker-Jones (WAL)	10
Audrey Etoua Biock (CMR)	01
