= Lawn bowls at the 2022 Commonwealth Games – Women's pairs B6–8 =

Bowls event

Lawn bowls men's pairs B6–8 at the 2022 Commonwealth Games
- Venue: Victoria Park
- Dates: 29 July – 3 August 2022
- Competitors: 10 from 5 nations

Medalists
gold medal	Rosemary Lenton; Pauline Wilson	Scotland
silver medal	Cheryl Lindfield; Serena Bonnell	Australia
bronze medal	Victoria van der Merwe; Desiree Levin	South Africa

Lawn bowls women's pairs B6–8 at the 2022 Commonwealth Games was held at the Victoria Park from July 29 to August 3. A total of 12 athletes from 6 associations participated in the event. Rosemary Lenton and Pauline Wilson of Scotland won the gold medal, defeating Cheryl Lindfield and Serena Bonnell from Australia in the final. South Africa's Victoria van der Merwe and Desiree Levin won the bronze medal.

== Sectional play ==
The top four advance to the knockout stage.

Rank	Nation	Athletes	MP	MW	MT	ML	FR	AG	PD	PTS
1	England	Michelle White, Gillian Platt	4	3	0	1	66	39	+27	9
2	South Africa	Victoria van der Merwe, Desiree Levin	4	3	0	1	72	50	+22	9
3	Australia	Cheryl Lindfield, Serena Bonnell	4	3	0	1	58	52	+6	9
4	Scotland	Rosemary Lenton, Pauline Wilson	4	1	0	3	48	70	-22	3
5	New Zealand	Lynda Bennett, Pam Walker	4	0	0	4	38	71	-33	0

	Australia	England	New Zealand	South Africa	Scotland
Australia	—	5–22	19–8	18–7	16–15
England	22–5	—	12–10	13–17	19–7
New Zealand	8–19	10–12	—	8–25	12–15
South Africa	7–18	17–13	25–8	—	23–11
Scotland	15–16	7–19	15–12	11–23	—

== Knockout stage ==
Semifinal
A1	England	10
A4	Scotland	16
A3	Australia	19
A2	South Africa	12

Final
A4	Scotland	17
A3	Australia	5
Bronze medal
A1	England	7
A2	South Africa	16
