= Athletics at the 2022 Commonwealth Games – Women's triple jump =

Women's triple jump at the 2022 Commonwealth Games
- Venue: Alexander Stadium
- Dates: 5 August
- Competitors: 13 from 11 nations
- Winning distance: 14.94

Medalists
gold medal	Shanieka Ricketts	Jamaica
silver medal	Thea LaFond	Dominica
bronze medal	Naomi Metzger	England

The women's triple jump at the 2022 Commonwealth Games, as part of the athletics programme, took place in the Alexander Stadium on 5 August 2022.

== Records ==
Prior to this competition, the existing world and Games records were as follows:

World record	Yulimar Rojas (VEN)	15.74 m	Belgrade, Serbia	20 March 2022
Commonwealth record	Françoise Mbango Etone (CMR)	15.39 m	Beijing, China	17 August 2008
Games record	Ashia Hansen (ENG)	14.86 m	Manchester, England	31 July 2002

== Schedule ==
The schedule was as follows:

Date	Time	Round
Friday 5 August 2022	20:35	Final

All times are British Summer Time (UTC+1)

== Results ==
=== Final ===
The medals were determined in the final.

Rank	Name	#1	#2	#3	#4	#5	#6	Result	Notes
1st place, gold medalist(s)	Shanieka Ricketts (JAM)	14.94	x	x	11.56	13.95	14.61	14.94	GR, SB
2nd place, silver medalist(s)	Thea LaFond (DMA)	14.39	13.70	14.19	14.25	14.04	x	14.39	
3rd place, bronze medalist(s)	Naomi Metzger (ENG)	14.32	14.23	14.37	x	14.36	x	14.37	PB
4	Kimberly Williams (JAM)	13.90	14.19	14.14	14.05	14.04	14.25	14.25	
5	Ruth Usoro (NGR)	14.02	13.72	x	13.50	x	x	14.02	
6	Ackelia Smith (JAM)	13.32	13.77	13.56	13.29	13.83	13.52	13.83	
7	Mikeisha Welcome (SVG)	12.94	13.22	13.16	x	12.53	12.86	13.22	
8	Liliane Potiron (MRI)	x	13.06	13.20	12.77	12.76	x	13.20	
9	Sandisha Antoine (LCA)	12.62	12.61	13.01				13.01	
10	Chantoba Bright (GUY)	12.97	12.83	x				12.97	SB
11	Annie Topal (PNG)	x	12.75	12.55				12.75	SB
12	Lerato Sechele (LES)	x	x	12.57				12.57	
13	Veronique Kossenda Rey (CMR)	x	12.26	12.46				12.46	
