= Jasmine Hacker-Jones =

British judoka (born 2000)

Personal information
- Nationality: British (Welsh)
- Born: 11 July 2000 (age 26) Wales
- Home town: Cardiff, Wales

Sport
- Sport: Judo
- Event: -63kg
- Club: Maesteg Judo Club
Medal record
Women's judo
Representing Wales
Commonwealth Games
Bronze medal – third place	2022 Birmingham	women's -63 kg

Jasmine Hacker-Jones (born 11 July 2000) is a Welsh international judoka.

== Biography ==
Hacker-Jones started judo aged 4 and was the leading British performer at the 2017 European Youth Olympics. In 2022, she was selected for the 2022 Commonwealth Games in Birmingham, where she competed in the women's -63 kg, winning the bronze medal.
