= Jovan van Vuuren =

South African Olympic Athlete

Personal information
- Born: Jovan Daniél van Vuuren; 17 July 1996 (age 29) Bloemfontein, Free State
- Height: 1.93m

Sport
- Country: South Africa
- Sport: Athletics
- Event: Long jump
- Coached by: Neil Cornelius (2018 - Present)

Achievements and titles
- Personal best: 8.30 m (27 ft 2 3/4 in) (2024)
Medal record
Representing South Africa
Commonwealth Games
Bronze medal – third place	2022 Birmingham	Long jump

Jovan Dániel van Vuuren (born 17 July 1996) is a South African Olympic athlete who competes as a long jumper.

A native of Bloemfontein, van Vuuren was a bronze medalist in long jump at the 2022 Commonwealth Games in Birmingham, England. It was a breakthrough year for van Vuuren as he also jumped a career best 8.16 metres that season, won his first national long jump title and appeared at the World Championships. In 2024, Jovan jumped an Olympic Qualifier and Personal Best of 8.30m.
