= Anthony Cox (sprinter) =

Jamaican sprinter (born 2000)

Personal information
- Born: 26 August 2000 (age 25) Jamaica

Sport
- Sport: Athletics
Medal record
Men's track and field
Representing Jamaica
World Championships
Silver medal – second place	2022 Eugene	4×400 m relay
IAAF World U18 Championships
Silver medal – second place	2017 Nairobi	4×400 metres relay
Pan American U20 Championships
Silver medal – second place	2019 San José	4×400 m relay
Caribbean Games
Gold medal – first place	2022 Basse-Terre	400 metres
Carifta Games Junior (U20)
Gold medal – first place	2019 George Town	4x400 meters relay
Silver medal – second place	2019 George Town	400 meters

Anthony Cox (born 26 August 2000) is a Jamaican sprinter. He represented Jamaica at the 2022 World Athletics Championships, competing in 4 × 400 metres relay.
