= Badminton at the 2022 Commonwealth Games =

- Venue: National Exhibition Centre
- Dates: 29 July – 8 August 2022
- Competitors: 151 from 29 nations

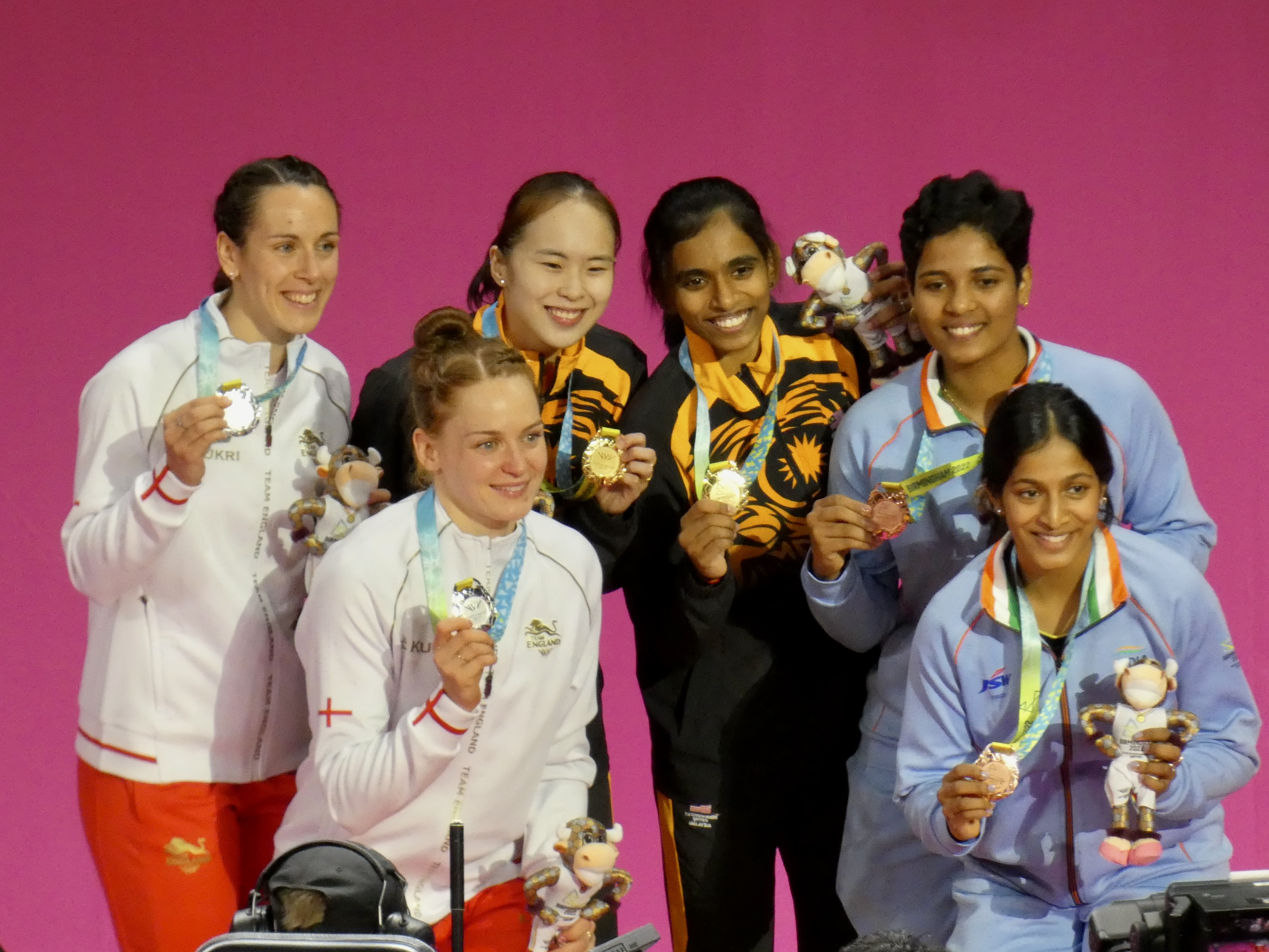
The six medallists in the women's doubles at the 2022 Commonwealth Games in Birmingham.

Badminton at the 2022 Commonwealth Games was the 15th appearance of Badminton at the Commonwealth Games. The badminton competition was one of the sports contested at the 2022 Commonwealth Games, held in Birmingham, England. This was the fifteenth staging since its inclusion in 1966, and the second staging within England specifically.

The competition took place between 29 July and 8 August 2022, spread across six events.

== Schedule ==
The competition schedule is as follows:

G	Preliminary matches (group)	P	Preliminary matches (knockout)	¼	Quarter-finals	½	Semi-finals	B	Bronze medal match	F	Gold medal match

Date Event	Fri 29			Sat 30			Sun 31		Mon 1		Tue 2		Wed 3		Thu 4		Fri 5		Sat 6		Sun 7		Mon 8
Session →	M	A	E	M	A	E	A	E	A	E	A	E	M	E	M	E	A	E	A	E	M	E	M
Men's singles													P		P		P		¼		½	B	F
Men's doubles															P		P			¼	½	B	F
Women's singles													P		P		P		¼		½	B	F
Women's doubles													P				P			¼	½	B	F
Mixed doubles													P		P		P		¼		½	B	F
Mixed team	G			G			¼		½		B	F											

== Venue ==
The badminton competition was held at the National Exhibition Centre in Solihull. Five other sports – boxing, netball, para powerlifting, table tennis, and weightlifting – also took place there.

== Qualification (mixed team) ==
All nations were able to enter whoever they wish (up to five men and five women overall) in the singles and doubles events.

In addition, sixteen nations were also entitled to contest the mixed team event; subject to at least four CGF regions being represented and a minimum entry of two men / two women per team, they qualify as follows:

- The host nation.
- The top 14 nations in the BWF World Ranking as of 1 February 2022, excluding the host nation. Their highest-ranked players in each of the five individual rankings are added together to determine the combined ranking.
- One nation not already qualified receives a CGF/BWF Bipartite Invitation.

Means of qualification	Date	Quotas	Qualified
Host nation	—N/a	1	England
BWF World Ranking	1 February 2022	14	India; Malaysia; Canada; Singapore; Scotland; Australia; ~~Nigeria~~ (Note: Quota place declined and reallocated to next team in the rankings.); ~~New Zealand~~; Sri Lanka; Mauritius; South Africa; Maldives; Uganda; Jamaica; Barbados; Zambia
Bipartite invitation	8 March 2022	1	Pakistan
TOTAL		16	

Note

In contrast to other sports with a qualifying system, all badminton player selections came from their nations' open allocation quotas regardless of mixed team qualification.

== Medal summary ==
=== Medal table ===
* Host nation (England)

Rank	Nation	Gold	Silver	Bronze	Total
1	India	3	1	2	6
2	Malaysia	2	1	2	5
3	Singapore	1	0	2	3
4	England*	0	3	0	3
5	Canada	0	1	0	1
Totals (5 entries)		6	6	6	18

=== Medalists ===
Event	Gold	Silver	Bronze
Men's singles	Lakshya Sen; India	Ng Tze Yong; Malaysia	Srikanth Kidambi; India
Men's doubles	India; Satwiksairaj Rankireddy; Chirag Shetty	England; Ben Lane; Sean Vendy	Malaysia; Aaron Chia; Soh Wooi Yik
Women's singles	P. V. Sindhu; India	Michelle Li; Canada	Yeo Jia Min; Singapore
Women's doubles	Malaysia; Pearly Tan; Thinaah Muralitharan	England; Chloe Birch; Lauren Smith	India; Treesa Jolly; Gayatri Gopichand
Mixed doubles	Singapore; Terry Hee; Tan Wei Han	England; Marcus Ellis; Lauren Smith	Malaysia; Tan Kian Meng; Lai Pei Jing
Mixed team	Malaysia; Ng Tze Yong; Aaron Chia; Soh Wooi Yik; Goh Jin Wei; Pearly Tan; Thinaah Muralitharan; Chan Peng Soon; Cheah Yee See; Tan Kian Meng; Lai Pei Jing	India; Lakshya Sen; Srikanth Kidambi; B. Sumeeth Reddy; Satwiksairaj Rankireddy; Chirag Shetty; P. V. Sindhu; Aakarshi Kashyap; Gayatri Gopichand; Treesa Jolly; Ashwini Ponnappa	Singapore; Loh Kean Yew; Jason Teh; Terry Hee; Tan Wei Han; Loh Kean Hean; Andy Kwek; Yeo Jia Min; Jin Yujia; Crystal Wong; Nur Insyirah Khan

== Participating nations ==
There were 29 participating Commonwealth Games Associations (CGA's) in badminton with a total of 151 (78 men and 73 women) athletes. The number of athletes a nation entered is in parentheses beside the name of the country.

- Australia (10)
- Barbados (4)
- Cameroon (2)
- Canada (8)
- Cyprus (2)
- England (10)
- Falkland Islands (9)
- Guernsey (4)
- Ghana (5)
- Guyana (2)
- India (10)
- Isle of Man (1)
- Jamaica (4)
- Kenya (2)
- Malaysia (10)
- Maldives (6)
- Malta (2)
- Mauritius (8)
- New Zealand (2)
- Northern Ireland (1)
- Pakistan (4)
- Saint Helena (1)
- Scotland (9)
- Sierra Leone (2)
- Singapore (10)
- South Africa (5)
- Sri Lanka (6)
- Uganda (8)
- Zambia (4)
