= Badminton at the Commonwealth Games =

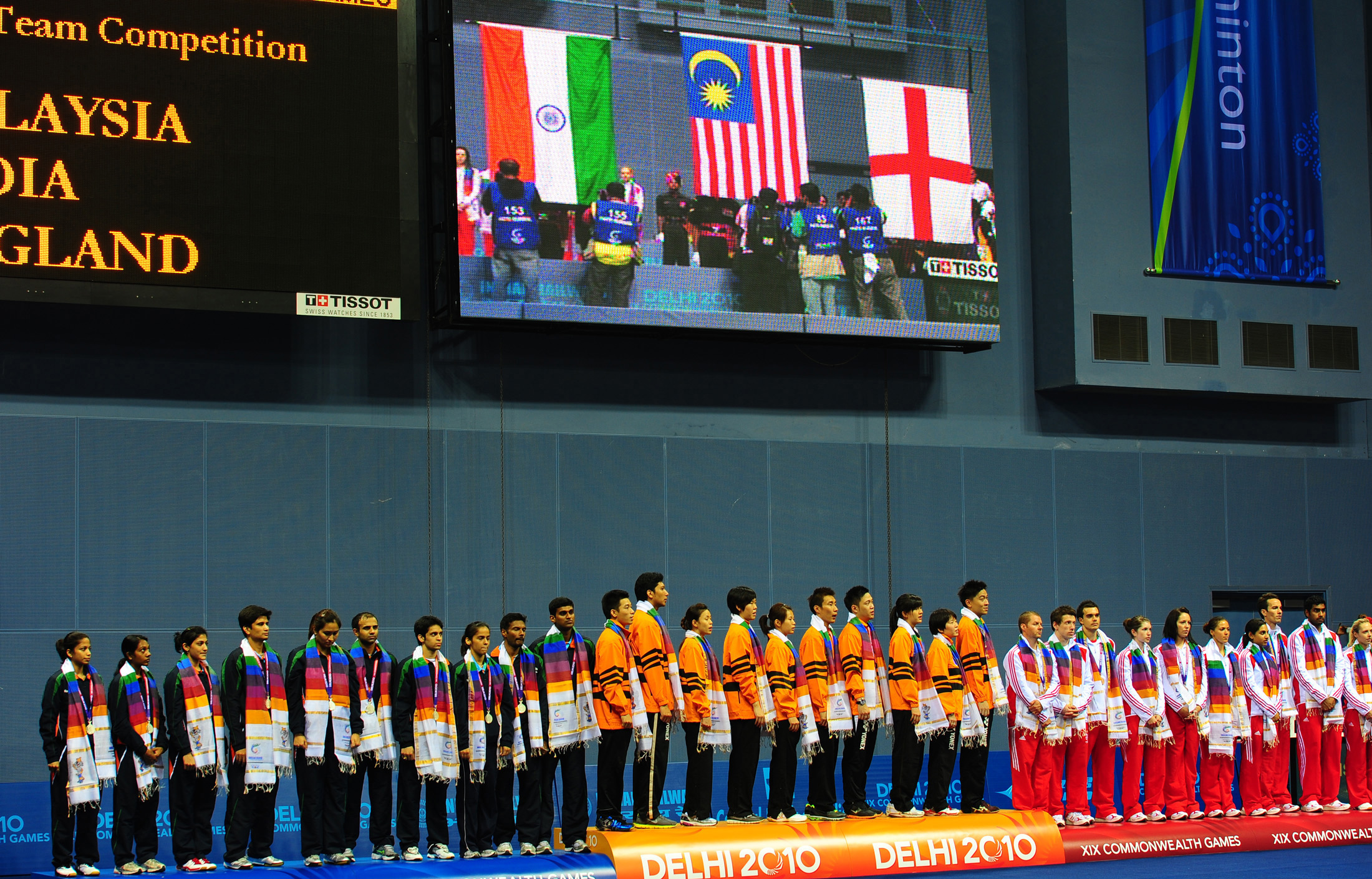
Medalists of the badminton mixed team at the 2010 Commonwealth Games.

Badminton had its debut at the 1966 Commonwealth Games and has been contested in 14 consecutive Commonwealth Games since.

== Editions ==
Games	Year	Host city
VIII	1966	Kingston, Jamaica
IX	1970	Edinburgh, Scotland
X	1974	Christchurch, New Zealand
XI	1978	Edmonton, Canada
XII	1982	Brisbane, Australia
XIII	1986	Edinburgh, Scotland
XIV	1990	Auckland, New Zealand
XV	1994	Victoria, Canada
XVI	1998	Kuala Lumpur, Malaysia
XVII	2002	Manchester, England
XVIII	2006	Melbourne, Australia
XIX	2010	New Delhi, India
XX	2014	Glasgow, Scotland
XXI	2018	Gold Coast, Australia
XXII	2022	Birmingham, England

== History ==
Badminton was added to the Commonwealth Games programme in 1966, as an optional sport. The sport was chosen to replace lawn bowls, due to the lack of facilities at Jamaica. Having this status until the 1994 edition, when it became a mandatory sport. In the first three editions, five events were played (men's and women's singles, men's and women's doubles and mixed doubles). Between 1978 and 1990 a sixth event was in the programme (the mixed team competition). Also between 1966 and 1990, one bronze medal was at stake. Between 1994 and 2002, the losers of the two semifinals also won two bronze medals. In 1998, the team events in both genres were introduced, but at the next edition the event was dropped and the mixed teams event returned. Later in 2002, the mixed team event returned. The last change to the programme was in 2006, when the format and events played were reverted to the format used until 1990.

=== Events ===
Current program
Event	66	70	74	78	82	86	90	94	98	02	06	10	14	18	22
Men's singles	X	X	X	X	X	X	X	X	X	X	X	X	X	X	X
Men's doubles	X	X	X	X	X	X	X	X	X	X	X	X	X	X	X
Women's singles	X	X	X	X	X	X	X	X	X	X	X	X	X	X	X
Women's doubles	X	X	X	X	X	X	X	X	X	X	X	X	X	X	X
Mixed doubles	X	X	X	X	X	X	X	X	X	X	X	X	X	X	X
Mixed team				X	X	X	X	X		X	X	X	X	X	X
Past program
Men's team									X						
Women's team									X						
Events	5	5	5	6	6	6	6	6	7	6	6	6	6	6	6

== Medal table ==
As of 2022 edition

Rank	Nation	Gold	Silver	Bronze	Total
1	England	37	37	38	112
2	Malaysia	31	22	16	69
3	India	10	8	13	31
4	Canada	3	11	6	20
5	Singapore	2	5	6	13
6	Australia	2	1	9	12
7	Scotland	1	2	7	10
8	Hong Kong	1	0	2	3
9	Wales	1	0	1	2
10	New Zealand	0	2	9	11
Totals (10 entries)		**88**	**88**	**107**	**283**

=== Successful national teams ===
Below is the gold medalists shown based by category and countries after the 2022 Commonwealth Games. England has been the most successful nation in the Commonwealth Games.

Rank	Country	66	70	74	78	82	86	90	94	98	02	06	10	14	18	22	Total
1	England	**3**	**3**	**4**	**4**	**3**	**4**	**4**	**3**	3^{1}	2	2		1	2^{2}		37
2	Malaysia	2	1	1	1	1		2	2	**3**^{1}	**3**	**4**	**4**	**3**	2^{2}	2	31
3	India				1	1							2	1	**2**^{2}	**3**	10
4	Canada		1			1								1			3
5	Australia						1		1								2
5	Singapore										1					1	2
7	Scotland						1										1
7	Hong Kong							1									1
7	Wales									1							1

BOLD means overall winner of badminton at Commonwealth Games

^1 England and Malaysia were tied with three gold medals. However, Malaysia won four silver medals and England won one, thus Malaysia became the overall winner.
^2 India, England, and Malaysia were tied with two gold medals. However, India won three silver medals, Malaysia won two, and England won one, thus India became the overall winner.

== Past winners ==
=== Individual competition ===
Year	Men's singles	Women's singles	Men's doubles	Women's doubles	Mixed doubles
1966	(Malaysia) Tan Aik Huang	(England) Angela Bairstow	(Malaysia) Tan Aik Huang (Malaysia) Yew Cheng Hoe	(England) Helen Horton (England) Ursula Smith	(England) Roger Mills (England) Angela Bairstow
1970	(Canada) Jamie Paulson	(England) Margaret Beck	(Malaysia) Punch Gunalan (Malaysia) Ng Boon Bee	(England) Margaret Boxall (England) Sue Whetnall	(England) Derek Talbot (England) Margaret Boxall
1974	(Malaysia) Punch Gunalan	(England) Gillian Gilks	(England) Elliot Stuart (England) Derek Talbot	(England) Margaret Boxall (England) Gillian Gilks	(England) Derek Talbot (England) Gillian Gilks
1978	(India) Prakash Padukone	(Malaysia) Sylvia Ng	(England) Ray Stevens (England) Mike Tredgett	(England) Nora Perry (England) Anne Statt	(England) Mike Tredgett (England) Nora Perry
1982	(India) Syed Modi	(England) Helen Troke	(Malaysia) Ong Beng Teong (Malaysia) Razif Sidek	(Canada) Claire Backhouse (Canada) Johanne Falardeau	(England) Martin Dew (England) Karen Chapman
1986	(England) Steve Baddeley	(England) Helen Troke	(Scotland) Billy Gilliland (Scotland) Dan Travers	(England) Gillian Clark (England) Gillian Gowers	(Australia) Michael Scandolera (Australia) Audrey Tuckey
1990	(Malaysia) Rashid Sidek	(England) Fiona Smith	(Malaysia) Jalani Sidek (Malaysia) Razif Sidek	(England) Sara Sankey (England) Fiona Smith	(Hong Kong) Chan Chi Choi (Hong Kong) Amy Chan
1994	(Malaysia) Rashid Sidek	(Australia) Lisa Campbell	(Malaysia) Cheah Soon Kit (Malaysia) Soo Beng Kiang	(England) Joanne Muggeridge (England) Joanne Wright	(England) Chris Hunt (England) Gillian Clark
1998	(Malaysia) Wong Choong Hann	(Wales) Kelly Morgan	(Malaysia) Choong Tan Fook (Malaysia) Lee Wan Wah	(England) Joanne Goode (England) Donna Kellogg	(England) Simon Archer (England) Joanne Goode
2002	(Malaysia) Muhammad Hafiz Hashim	(Singapore) Li Li	(Malaysia) Chan Chong Ming (Malaysia) Chew Choon Eng	(Malaysia) Ang Li Peng (Malaysia) Lim Pek Siah	(England) Simon Archer (England) Joanne Goode
2006	(Malaysia) Lee Chong Wei	(England) Tracey Hallam	(Malaysia) Chan Chong Ming (Malaysia) Koo Kien Keat	(Malaysia) Chin Eei Hui (Malaysia) Wong Pei Tty	(England) Nathan Robertson (England) Gail Emms
2010	(Malaysia) Lee Chong Wei	(India) Saina Nehwal	(Malaysia) Koo Kien Keat (Malaysia) Tan Boon Heong	(India) Jwala Gutta (India) Ashwini Ponnappa	(Malaysia) Koo Kien Keat (Malaysia) Chin Eei Hui
2014	(India) Parupalli Kashyap	(Canada) Michelle Li	(Malaysia) Tan Wee Kiong (Malaysia) Goh V Shem	(Malaysia) Vivian Hoo (Malaysia) Woon Khe Wei	(England) Chris Adcock (England) Gabby Adcock
2018	(Malaysia) Lee Chong Wei	(India) Saina Nehwal	(England) Marcus Ellis (England) Chris Langridge	(Malaysia) Chow Mei Kuan (Malaysia) Vivian Hoo	(England) Chris Adcock (England) Gabby Adcock
2022	(India) Lakshya Sen	(India) P. V. Sindhu	(India) Satwiksairaj Rankireddy (India) Chirag Shetty	(Malaysia) Pearly Tan (Malaysia) Thinaah Muralitharan	(Singapore) Terry Hee (Singapore) Tan Wei Han

=== Team competition ===
Year	Men	Women	Mixed
1966	—N/a	—N/a	—N/a
1970	—N/a	—N/a	—N/a
1974	—N/a	—N/a	—N/a
1978	—N/a	—N/a	England
1982	—N/a	—N/a	England
1986	—N/a	—N/a	England
1990	—N/a	—N/a	England
1994	—N/a	—N/a	England
1998	Malaysia	England	—N/a
2002	—N/a	—N/a	England
2006	—N/a	—N/a	Malaysia
2010	—N/a	—N/a	Malaysia
2014	—N/a	—N/a	Malaysia
2018	—N/a	—N/a	India
2022	—N/a	—N/a	Malaysia
