= Treesa Jolly =

Indian badminton player (born 2003)

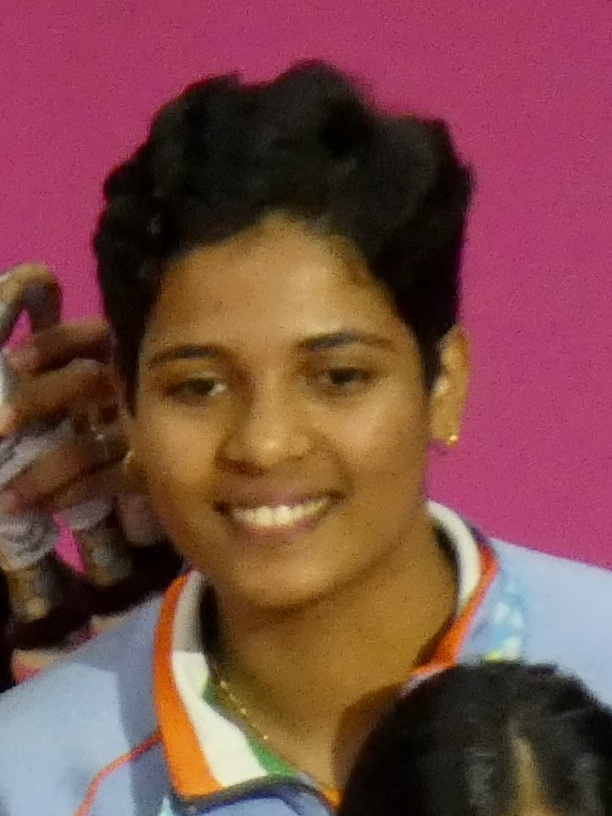
- Treesa at the 2022 Commonwealth Games

Personal information
- Born: 27 May 2003 (age 23) Cherupuzha, Kerala, India
- Height: 1.76 m (5 ft 9 in)
- Weight: 48 kg (106 lb)

Sport
- Country: India
- Sport: Badminton
- Handedness: Right
- Coached by: Pullela Gopichand; Arun Vishnu

Women's doubles
- Highest ranking: 9 (with Gayatri Gopichand, 14 January 2025)
- Current ranking: 19 (with Gayatri Gopichand, 17 November 2026)
- BWF profile
Medal record
Women's badminton
Representing India
World Championships
Bronze medal – third place	2026 New Delhi	Women's doubles
Commonwealth Games
Silver medal – second place	2022 Birmingham	Mixed team
Bronze medal – third place	2022 Birmingham	Women's doubles
Asian Mixed Team Championships
Bronze medal – third place	2023 Dubai	Mixed team
Asian Team Championships
Gold medal – first place	2024 Selangor	Women's team

Treesa Jolly (born 27 May 2003) is an Indian badminton player. With her doubles partner Gayatri Gopichand, she has won bronze medals at the 2026 World Championships and the 2022 Commonwealth Games. She was a member of the women's team that won the 2024 Asia Team Championships.

== Early life ==
Treesa was born on 27 May 2003 in Cherupuzha in Kannur district of Kerala. Her father, Jolly Mathew, was a physical education teacher and volleyball coach for a local school team. Her mother, Daisy Jolly, is a teacher. It was under her father that Treesa first started training in badminton. She started training in badminton at the age of five, and after winning various age-group championships, she left home at the age of 13 to undergo specialist training under Dr. Anil Ramachandran, Director of Sports, Kannur University. After a strong performance in the Khelo India Youth Games, Treesa joined the Gopichand Badminton Academy in early 2020 and switched to doubles with Gayatri Gopichand. She is part of the Target Olympic Podium Scheme (TOPS) of the Ministry of Youth Affairs and Sports.

== Achievements ==
=== World Championships ===
Women's doubles
Year	Venue	Partner	Opponent	Score	Result	Ref.
2026	Indira Gandhi Arena; New Delhi, India	(India) Gayatri Gopichand	(China) Liu Shengshu (China) Tan Ning	21–18, 13–21, 8–21	Bronze	

=== Commonwealth Games ===
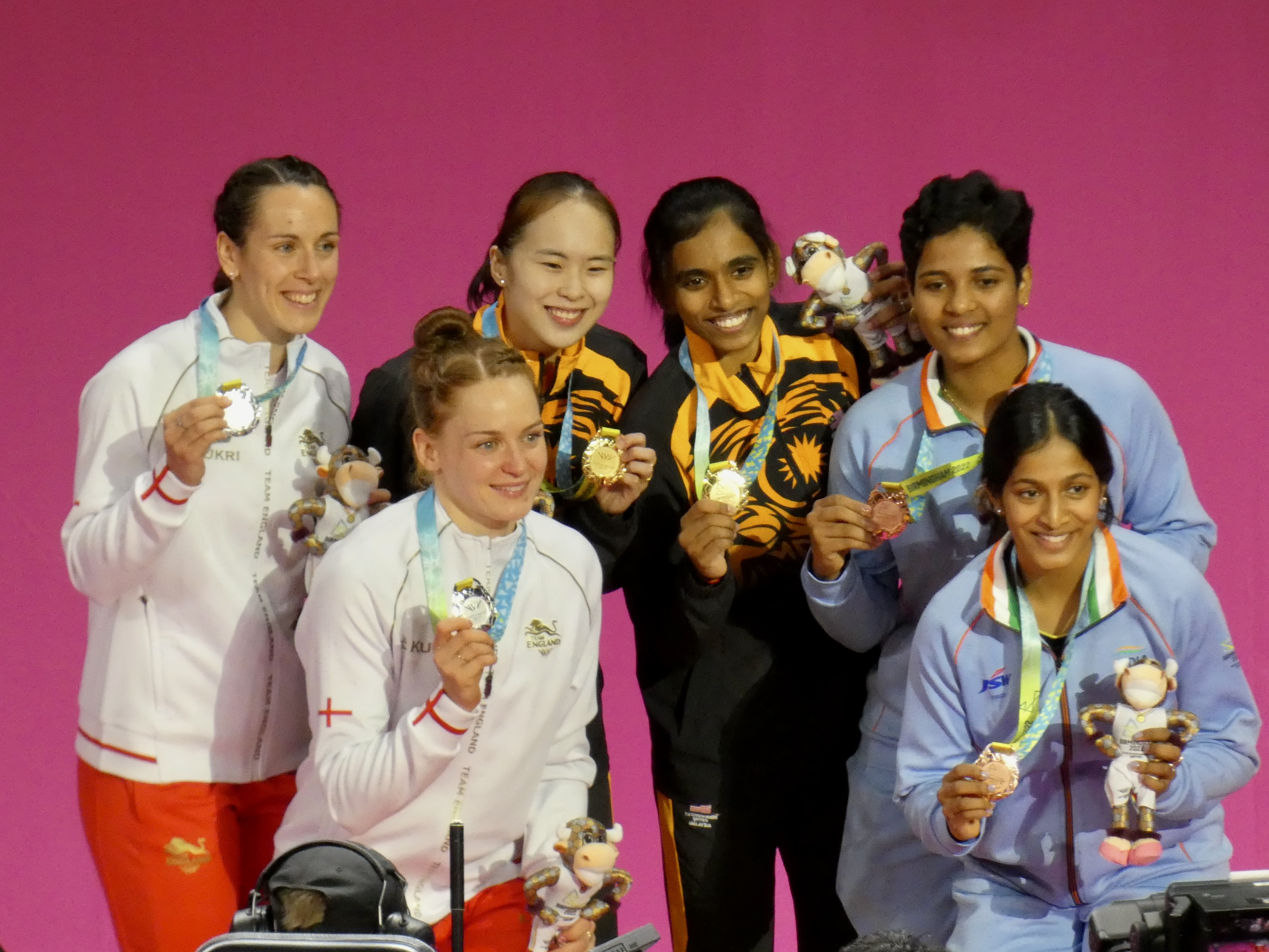
The six medallists in the women's badminton doubles at the 2022 Commonwealth Games in Birmingham. Left to right: Chloe Birch and Lauren Smith (England), Pearly Tan and Thinaah Muralitharan (Malaysia), Treesa Jolly and Gayatri Gopichand (India).

Women's doubles
Year	Venue	Partner	Opponent	Score	Result
2022	National Exhibition Centre; Birmingham, England	(India) Gayatri Gopichand	(Australia) Chen Hsuan-yu (Australia) Gronya Somerville	21–15, 21–18	Bronze

=== BWF World Tour (3 titles, 2 runners-up) ===
The BWF World Tour, which was announced on 19 March 2017 and implemented in 2018, is a series of elite badminton tournaments sanctioned by the Badminton World Federation (BWF). The BWF World Tour is divided into levels of World Tour Finals, Super 1000, Super 750, Super 500, Super 300 (part of the HSBC World Tour), and the BWF Tour Super 100.

Women's doubles
Year	Tournament	Level	Partner	Opponent	Score	Result
2022	Syed Modi International	Super 300	(India) Gayatri Gopichand	(Malaysia) Anna Cheong (Malaysia) Teoh Mei Xing	12–21, 13–21	(silver) Runner-up
2022	Odisha Open	Super 100	(India) Gayatri Gopichand	(India) Sanyogita Ghorpade (India) Shruti Mishra	21–12, 21–10	(gold) Winner
2024	Syed Modi International	Super 300	(India) Gayatri Gopichand	(China) Bao Lijing (China) Li Qian	21–18, 21–11	(gold) Winner
2025	Syed Modi International	Super 300	(India) Gayatri Gopichand	(Japan) Kaho Osawa (Japan) Mai Tanabe	17–21, 21–13, 21–15	(gold) Winner

Mixed doubles
Year	Tournament	Level	Partner	Opponent	Score	Result
2022	Odisha Open	Super 100	(India) Arjun M. R.	(Sri Lanka) Sachin Dias (Sri Lanka) Thilini Hendahewa	16–21, 20–22	(silver) Runner-up

=== BWF International Challenge / Series (3 titles, 3 runners-up) ===
Women's doubles
Year	Tournament	Partner	Opponent	Score	Result
2021	Polish International	(India) Gayatri Gopichand	(France) Margot Lambert (France) Anne Tran	10–21, 18–21	(silver) Runner-up
2021	India International Challenge	(India) Gayatri Gopichand	(India) Tanisha Crasto (India) Rutaparna Panda	23–21, 21–14	(gold) Winner
2021	Welsh International	(India) Gayatri Gopichand	(France) Margot Lambert (France) Anne Tran	20–22, 21–17, 14–21	(silver) Runner-up
2022	Bahrain International Challenge	(India) Gayatri Gopichand	(Indonesia) Lanny Tria Mayasari (Indonesia) Ribka Sugiarto	18–21, 16–21	(silver) Runner-up
2026	Philippine International	(India) Gayatri Gopichand	(Japan) Miki Kanehiro (Japan) Yuna Kato	16–21, 21–4, 21–17	(gold) Winner

Mixed doubles
Year	Tournament	Partner	Opponent	Score	Result
2025	Turkey International	(India) Hariharan Amsakarunan	(Indonesia) M. Nawaf Khoiriyansyah (Indonesia) Nahya Muhyifa	21–14, 18–21, 21–11	(gold) Winner

BWF International Challenge tournament
BWF International Series tournament
BWF Future Series tournament

=== BWF Junior International (2 titles, 2 runners-up) ===
Girls' singles
Year	Tournament	Opponent	Score	Result
2018	Bangladesh Junior International	(United States) Ruhi Raju	21–15, 21–11	(gold) Winner
2019	Dubai Junior International	(India) Tasnim Mir	15–21, 19–21	(silver) Runner-up

Girls' doubles
Year	Tournament	Partner	Opponent	Score	Result
2019	Dubai Junior International	(India) Varshini Vishwanath Sri	(India) Tanisha Crasto (India) Aditi Bhatt	17–21, 17–21	(silver) Runner-up

Mixed doubles
Year	Tournament	Partner	Opponent	Score	Result
2018	Bangladesh Junior International	(India) Manav Raj Sumith	(Bangladesh) Gourab Singha (Bangladesh) Urmi Akter	21–14, 21–14	(gold) Winner

BWF Junior International Grand Prix tournament
BWF Junior International Challenge tournament
BWF Junior International Series tournament
BWF Junior Future Series tournament

== Awards and nominations ==
Year	Award	Category	Result	Ref
2025	Times of India Sports Awards	Badminton Player of the Year Female	Nominated	
2026	Arjuna Award	Badminton (for 2025)	Won	
