= Zambia at the 2022 Commonwealth Games =

- Flag of Zambia
- CGF code: ZAM
- CGA: Commonwealth Games Association of Zambia
- Website: nocz.org

in Birmingham, England 28 July 2022 – 8 August 2022
- Competitors: 41 (30 men and 11 women) in 9 sports
- Flag bearers: Muzala Samukonga; Margret Tembo
- Medals Ranked =20th: Gold 1 Silver 1 Bronze 1 Total 3

Commonwealth Games appearances (overview)
- 1954; 1958; 1962–1966; 1970; 1974; 1978; 1982; 1986; 1990; 1994; 1998; 2002; 2006; 2010; 2014; 2018; 2022; 2026; 2030

Other related appearances
- Rhodesia and Nyasaland (1962)

Zambia competed at the 2022 Commonwealth Games in Birmingham, England between 28 July and 8 August 2022. It was Zambia's fifteenth appearance at the Games.

Muzala Samukonga and Margret Tembo were the country's opening ceremony flagbearers.

== Medalists ==
Medal	Name	Sport	Event	Date
Gold	Muzala Samukonga	Athletics	Men's 400 metres	7 August
Silver	Stephen Zimba	Boxing	Men's welterweight	7 August
Bronze	Patrick Chinyemba	Boxing	Men's flyweight	6 August

== Competitors ==
The following is the list of number of competitors participating at the Games per sport/discipline.

Sport	Men	Women	Total
Athletics	4	2	6
Badminton	2	2	4
Boxing	2	2	4
Cycling	2	0	2
Judo	3	2	5
Para powerlifting	1	0	1
Rugby sevens	13	0	13
Squash	1	1	2
Swimming	2	2	4
Total	30	11	41

== Athletics ==
A squad of six athletes was confirmed as of 2 July 2022.

Men
Track and road events

Athlete	Event	Heat		Semifinal		Final	
Athlete	Event	Result	Rank	Result	Rank	Result	Rank
Muzala Samukonga	400 m	44.89	1 Q	46.06	2 Q	44.66	1st place, gold medalist(s)
Kennedy Luchembe	400 m	46.74	3 Q	47.22	8	Did not advance	
Patrick Nyambe; Kennedy Luchembe; David Mulenga; Muzala Samukonga	4 × 400 m relay	3:06.02	3 Q	—N/a		3:04.76	5

Women
Track and road events

Athlete	Event	Heat		Semifinal		Final	
Athlete	Event	Result	Rank	Result	Rank	Result	Rank
Rhoda Njobvu	100 m	11.57	5	Did not advance			
Rhoda Njobvu	200 m	23.85	2 Q	23.72	4	Did not advance	
Niddy Mingilishi	400 m	54.30	7	Did not advance			

== Badminton ==
As of 1 June 2022, Zambia qualified for the mixed team event via the BWF World Rankings.

Singles

Athlete	Event	Round of 64	Round of 32	Round of 16	Quarterfinal	Semifinal	Final / BM	
Athlete	Event	Opposition Score	Opposition Score	Opposition Score	Opposition Score	Opposition Score	Opposition Score	Rank
Chongo Mulenga	Men's singles	Bhatti (PAK); L (6–21, 19–21)	Did not advance					
Kalombo Mulenga	Men's singles	Zaki (MDV); W (21–16, 21–8)	Kasirye (UGA); W (21–19, 14–21, 21–14)	Paul (MRI) (9–21, 11–21)	Did not advance			
Elizaberth Chipeleme	Women's singles	Li (IOM); L (15–21, 8–21)	Did not advance					
Ogar Siamupangila	Women's singles	Kobugabe (UGA); L (9–21, 8–21)	Did not advance					

Doubles

Athlete	Event	Round of 64	Round of 32	Round of 16	Quarterfinal	Semifinal	Final / BM	
Athlete	Event	Opposition Score	Opposition Score	Opposition Score	Opposition Score	Opposition Score	Opposition Score	Rank
Kalombo Mulenga; Chongo Mulenga	Men's doubles	—N/a	Abdul-Samad & Alphous (GHA); W (21–8, 21–7)	Kasirye & Wanagaliya (UGA); L (15–21, 15–21)	Did not advance			
Ogar Siamupangila; Elizaberth Chipeleme	Women's doubles	—N/a	Bodha & Dookhee (MRI); L (9–21, 7–21)	Did not advance				
Chongo Mulenga; Elizaberth Chipeleme	Mixed doubles	Alphous & Nantuo (GHA); L (19–21, 16–21)	Did not advance					
Kalombo Mulenga; Ogar Siamupangila	Mixed doubles	Bye	Hee & Tan (SGP); L (6–21, 4–21)	Did not advance				

Mixed team

Summary

Team	Event	Group stage				Quarterfinal	Semifinal	Final / BM	
Team	Event	Opposition Score	Opposition Score	Opposition Score	Rank	Opposition Score	Opposition Score	Opposition Score	Rank
Zambia	Mixed team	Malaysia; L 0–5	South Africa; L 1–4	Jamaica; L 1–4	4	Did not advance			

Squad

- Ogar Siamupangila
- Elizaberth Chipeleme
- Chongo Mulenga
- Kalombo Mulenga

Group stage

Pos	Team	Pld	W	L	MF	MA	MD	GF	GA	GD	PF	PA	PD	Pts	Qualification
1	Malaysia	3	3	0	15	0	+15	30	0	+30	630	228	+402	3	Knockout stage
2	South Africa	3	2	1	7	8	−1	15	17	−2	509	540	−31	2	Knockout stage
3	Jamaica	3	1	2	6	9	−3	12	18	−6	457	546	−89	1	
4	Zambia	3	0	3	2	13	−11	5	27	−22	368	650	−282	0	

Source: BWF

Malaysia
5
National Exhibition Centre, Court 4
29 July 2022, 09:00 UTC+1

Zambia
0

			1	2	3
1	(Malaysia) (Zambia)	Tan Kian Meng / Lai Pei Jing; Kalombo Mulenga / Ogar Siamupangila	21; 6	21; 3
2	(Malaysia) (Zambia)	Ng Tze Yong; Chongo Mulenga	21; 9	21; 8
3	(Malaysia) (Zambia)	Goh Jin Wei; Elizaberth Chipeleme	21; 1	21; 2
4	(Malaysia) (Zambia)	Aaron Chia / Soh Wooi Yik; Kalombo Mulenga / Chongo Mulenga	21; 13	21; 9
5	(Malaysia) (Zambia)	Pearly Tan / Thinaah Muralitharan; Ogar Siamupangila / Elizaberth Chipeleme	21; 3	21; 5

South Africa
4
National Exhibition Centre, Court 4
29 July 2022, 19:00 UTC+1

Zambia
1

			1	2	3
1	(South Africa) (Zambia)	Jarred Elliot / Deidre Laurens Jordaan; Chongo Mulenga / Ogar Siamupangila	21; 13	21; 10
2	(South Africa) (Zambia)	Carden Kakora; Kalombo Mulenga	17; 21	21; 15	21; 12
3	(South Africa) (Zambia)	Johanita Scholtz; Elizaberth Chipeleme	21; 3	21; 9
4	(South Africa) (Zambia)	Jarred Elliott / Robert Summers; Chongo Mulenga / Kalombo Mulenga	17; 21	21; 16	13; 21
5	(South Africa) (Zambia)	Deidre Laurens Jordaan / Johanita Scholtz; Elizaberth Chipeleme / Ogar Siamupangila	21; 8	21; 8

Jamaica
4
National Exhibition Centre, Court 3
30 July 2022, 14:00 UTC+1

Zambia
1

			1	2	3
1	(Jamaica) (Zambia)	Joel Angus / Katherine Wynter; Chongo Mulenga / Ogar Siamupangila	22; 24	14; 21
2	(Jamaica) (Zambia)	Samuel Ricketts; Kalombo Mulenga	21; 15	21; 16
3	(Jamaica) (Zambia)	Tahlia Richardson; Elizaberth Chipeleme	21; 6	21; 13
4	(Jamaica) (Zambia)	Joel Angus / Samuel Ricketts; Chongo Mulenga / Kalombo Mulenga	21; 17	21; 19
5	(Jamaica) (Zambia)	Tahlia Richardson / Katherine Wynter; Ogar Siamupangila / Elizaberth Chipeleme	21; 12	21; 9

== Boxing ==
A squad of four boxers was confirmed as of 2 July 2022.

Athlete	Event	Round of 32	Round of 16	Quarterfinals	Semifinals	Final	
Athlete	Event	Opposition Result	Opposition Result	Opposition Result	Opposition Result	Opposition Result	Rank
Patrick Chinyemba	Men's Flyweight	—N/a	Keama (PNG); W RSC	Winwood (AUS); W KO	Panghal (IND); L 0 - 5	Did not advance	3rd place, bronze medalist(s)
Stephen Zimba	Men's Welterweight	Bye	McKeever (NIR); W RSC	Kibira (UGA); W 5 - 0	Tokas (IND); W 3 - 2	Croft (WAL); L 0 - 5	2nd place, silver medalist(s)
Margaret Tembo	Women's Minimumweight	—N/a	—N/a	Resztan (ENG); L 0 - 5	did not advance		
Felistars Nkandu	Women's Lightweight	—N/a	Bye	Broadhurst (NIR); L RSC	did not advance		

== Cycling ==
A squad of two cyclists was confirmed as of 2 July 2022.

=== Road ===
Athlete	Event	Time	Rank
Davies Kawemba	Men's road race	DNF	
Obert Chembe	Men's road race	DNF	

=== Mountain bike ===
Athlete	Event	Time	Rank
Davies Kawemba	Men's cross-country	LAP	
Obert Chembe	Men's cross-country	LAP	

== Judo ==
A squad of five judoka was confirmed as of 2 July 2022.

Athlete	Event	Round of 32	Round of 16	Quarterfinals	Semifinals	Repechage	Final/BM	
Athlete	Event	Opposition Result	Opposition Result	Opposition Result	Opposition Result	Opposition Result	Opposition Result	Rank
Simon Zulu	Men's -60 kg	Bye	Charles (TTO); W 10 - 00	Christodoulides (CYP); L 00 - 01	Did not advance	Rabbitt (WAL); W 10 - 00	Katz (AUS); L 00 - 10	5
Steven Mungandu	Men's -66 kg	—N/a	Abdulla (TAN); W 10 - 00	Allan (SCO); L 00 - 10	Did not advance	Burns (NIR); L 00 - 01	Did not advance	7
Matthews Mwango	Men's -73 kg	—N/a	Njie (GAM); L 00 - 10	did not advance				9
Rita Kabinda	Women's -57 kg	—N/a	Tariyal (IND); L 01 - 10	did not advance				9
Taonga Soko	Women's -63 kg	—N/a	James (NGR); L 00 - 10	did not advance				9

== Para powerlifting ==
As of 23 May 2022, Zambia qualified one powerlifter.

Athlete	Event	Result	Rank
Richard Lubanza	Men's lightweight	100.9	8

== Rugby sevens ==
As of 24 April 2022, Zambia qualified for the men's tournament. This was achieved through their position in the 2022 Africa Men's Sevens.

The thirteen-man roster was officially named as of 2 July 2022.

Summary

Team	Event	Preliminary Round				Quarterfinal / CQ	Semifinal / CS	Final / BM / CF	
Team	Event	Opposition Result	Opposition Result	Opposition Result	Rank	Opposition Result	Opposition Result	Opposition Result	Rank
Zambia men's	Men's tournament	Fiji; L 0 - 52	Wales; L 5 - 38	Canada; L 12 - 24	4	Tonga; L 7 - 19	Sri Lanka; L 14 - 27	—N/a	=15

=== Men's tournament ===
Roster

- Israel Kalumba (c)
- Edmond Hamayuwa
- Laston Mukosa
- Davy Chimbukulu
- Larry Kaushiku
- Elisha Bwalya
- Mike Masabo
- Brian Mbalwe
- Rodgers Mukupa
- Alex Mwewa
- Chisanga Nkoma
- Michello Sheleni
- Melvin Banda

Pool C

Pos	Team	Pld	W	D	L	PF	PA	PD	Pts	Qualification
1	Fiji	3	3	0	0	109	36	+73	9	Advance to Quarter-finals
2	Canada	3	2	0	1	67	31	+36	7	Advance to Quarter-finals
3	Wales	3	1	0	2	62	74	−12	5	Advance to classification Quarter-finals
4	Zambia	3	0	0	3	17	114	−97	3	Advance to classification Quarter-finals

Source: Birmingham2022
Rules for classification: 1) Points; 2) Head-to-head result; 3) Point difference; 4) Points scored.

29 July 2022
13:02

Fiji	52–0	Zambia
Try: Mocenacagi 2' c Nacuqu 3' c Mocenacagi 5' m Canakaivata 7' c Tuimaba 8' c Naduvalo (2) 11' m, 14' c Kunatani 13' c Con: Nacuqu (4/4) 2', 4', 7', 8'; Rasaku (0/1); Sauturaga (2/3) 13', 14'	Report

Coventry Stadium, Coventry
Referee: Morné Ferreira (South Africa)

29 July 2022
21:10

Wales	38–5	Zambia
Try: C. Williams 1' c Swannack 2' c Sieniawski 5' c Treharne 11' m Carson 13' c Smith 14' m Con: Treharne (3/3) 1', 3', 6'; T. Williams (1/3) 13'; Cards: C. Williams (yellow card) 9'	Report	Try: Kaushiku 9' m Con: Mwewa (0/1); Cards: Mukosa (yellow card) 11'; Banda (yellow card) 13'

Coventry Stadium, Coventry
Referee: Nick Hogan (New Zealand)

30 July 2022
12:40

Canada	24–12	Zambia
Try: Morra 3' m Morra 7' c Bowen 8' c Allen 12' m Con: Coats (2/3) 7', 9'; Webster (0/1)	Report	Try: Banda 2' m Kaushiku 5' c Con: Mukosa (0/1); Mwewa (1/1) 5'; Cards: Bwalya (yellow card) 7' Banda (yellow card) 8'

Coventry Stadium, Coventry
Referee: Tevita Rokovereni (Fiji

Classification Quarterfinals

30 July 2022
19:20

Tonga	19–7	Zambia
Try: Tongotea 6' c Fualalo 8' m Sunia 8' c Con: Pakalani (2/3) 7', 9'	Report	Try: Mukosa 11' c Con: Mbalwe (1/1) 12'; Cards: Bwalya (yellow card) 6'; Nkoma (yellow card) 14'

Coventry Stadium, Coventry
Referee: Adam Leal (England)

13th-16th Semifinals

31 July 2022
10:52

Sri Lanka	27–14	Zambia
Try: N. Ratwatte (2) 3' m, 8' m Chandradas 7' m Kudachchige 10' m A. Ratwatte 13' c Con: N. Ratwatte (0/1); A. Ratwatte (0/1); Hapugoda (1/3) 13'	Report	Try: Mwewa 5' c Chimbukulu 12' c Con: Mukosa (1/1) 5'; Mbalwe (1/1) 12'; Cards: Bwalya (yellow card) 7'

Coventry Stadium, Coventry
Referee: Ben Breakspear (Wales)

== Squash ==
A squad of two players was confirmed as of 2 July 2022.

Athlete	Event	Round of 64	Round of 32	Round of 16	Quarterfinals	Semifinals	Final	
Athlete	Event	Opposition Score	Opposition Score	Opposition Score	Opposition Score	Opposition Score	Opposition Score	Rank
Kundanji Kalengo	Men's singles	Sachvie (CAN); L 1 - 3	did not advance					
Zulema Chisenga	Women's singles	Katse (BOT); L 0 - 3	did not advance					

== Swimming ==
A squad of four swimmers was confirmed as of 2 July 2022.

Men

Athlete	Event	Heat		Semifinal		Final	
Athlete	Event	Time	Rank	Time	Rank	Time	Rank
Kumaren Naidu	50 m breaststroke	31.31	35	Did not advance			
Zach Moyo	50 m breaststroke	32.78	37	Did not advance			
Kumaren Naidu	100 m breaststroke	1:11.79	32	did not advance			
Zach Moyo	100 m breaststroke	1:12.83	33	did not advance			
Zach Moyo	200 m breaststroke	2:44.35	18	—N/a		did not advance	
Kumaren Naidu	50 m butterfly	27.39	48	did not advance			

Women

Athlete	Event	Heat		Semifinal		Final	
Athlete	Event	Time	Rank	Time	Rank	Time	Rank
Jade Phiri	50 m freestyle	28.16	47	did not advance			
Tilka Paljk	50 m freestyle	27.94	39	did not advance			
Tilka Paljk	50 m breaststroke	34.20	22	did not advance			
Tilka Paljk	100 m breaststroke	1:15.26	19	Did not advance			
Jade Phiri	50 m butterfly	29.15	31	did not advance			

Mixed

Athlete	Event	Heat		Final	
Athlete	Event	Time	Rank	Time	Rank
Kumaren Naidu; Zach Moyo; Jade Phiri; Tilka Paljk	4 × 100 m medley relay	4:30.43	16	Did not advance	
