= Gayatri Gopichand =

Indian badminton player (born 2003)

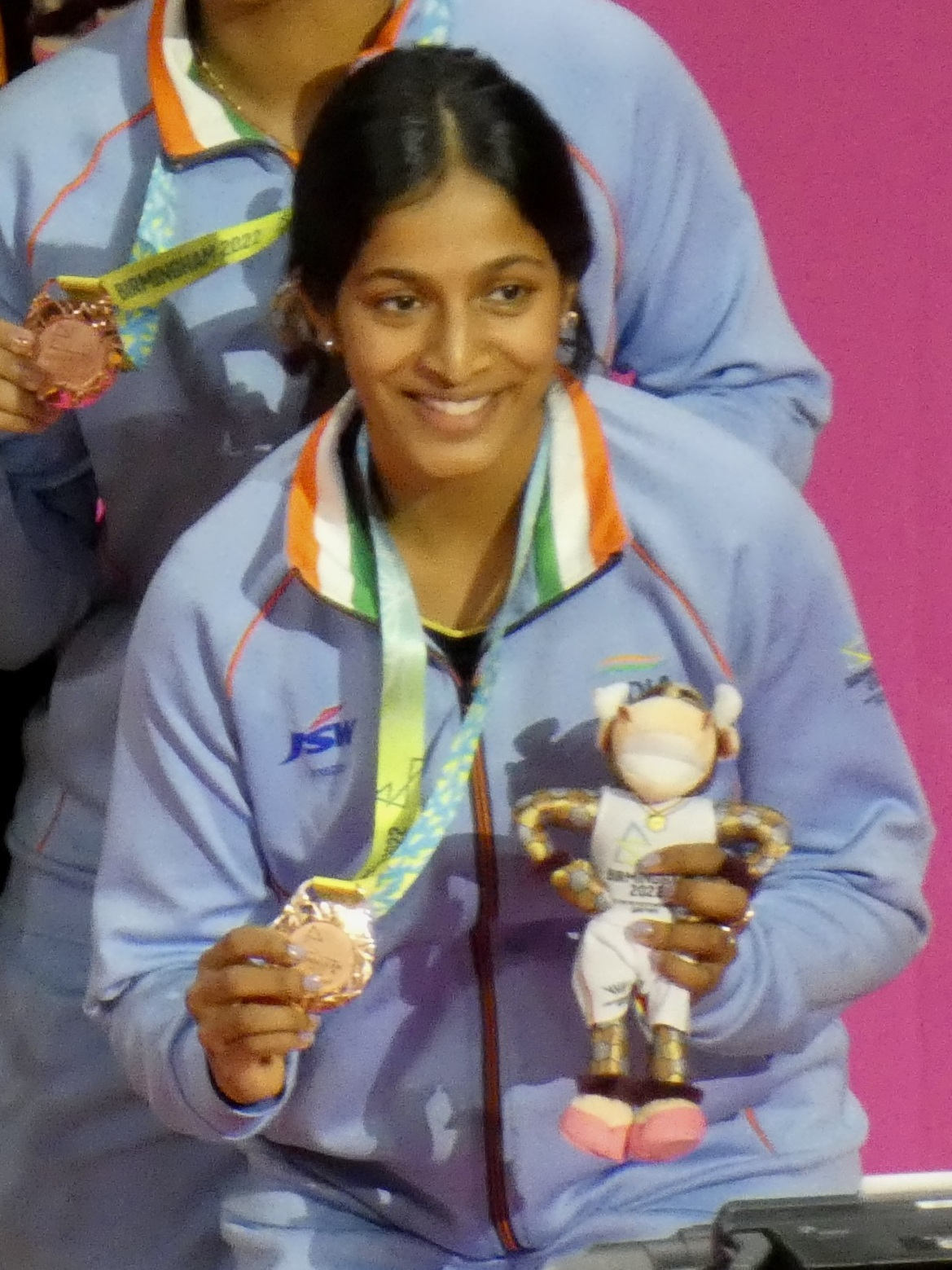
- Gayatri at the 2022 Commonwealth Games

Personal information
- Full name: Gayatri Gopichand Pullela
- Born: 4 March 2003 (age 23) Hyderabad, Andhra Pradesh (now Telangana), India
- Height: 1.62 m (5 ft 4 in)
- Weight: 56 kg (123 lb)

Sport
- Country: India
- Sport: Badminton
- Handedness: Right
- Coached by: Pullela Gopichand; Arun Vishnu

Women's doubles
- Highest ranking: 9 (with Treesa Jolly, 14 January 2025)
- Current ranking: 19 (with Treesa Jolly, 17 November 2026)
- BWF profile
Medal record
Women's badminton
Representing India
World Championships
Bronze medal – third place	2026 New Delhi	Women's doubles
Commonwealth Games
Silver medal – second place	2022 Birmingham	Mixed team
Bronze medal – third place	2022 Birmingham	Women's doubles
Asian Mixed Team Championships
Bronze medal – third place	2023 Dubai	Mixed team
Asian Team Championships
Gold medal – first place	2024 Selangor	Women's team
South Asian Games
Gold medal – first place	2019 Kathmandu–Pokhara	Women's team
Silver medal – second place	2019 Kathmandu–Pokhara	Women's singles

Gayatri Gopichand Pullela (born 4 March 2003) is an Indian badminton player. She is the daughter of former shuttlers P. V. V. Lakshmi and Pullela Gopichand. With her doubles partner Treesa Jolly, she has won bronze medals at the 2026 World Championships and the 2022 Commonwealth Games. She was a member of the women's team that medalled gold at the 2024 Asia Team Championships and the 2019 South Asian Games.

== Achievements ==
=== World Championships ===
Women's doubles
Year	Venue	Partner	Opponent	Score	Result	Ref.
2026	Indira Gandhi Arena; New Delhi, India	(India) Treesa Jolly	(China) Liu Shengshu (China) Tan Ning	21–18, 13–21, 8–21	Bronze	

=== Commonwealth Games ===
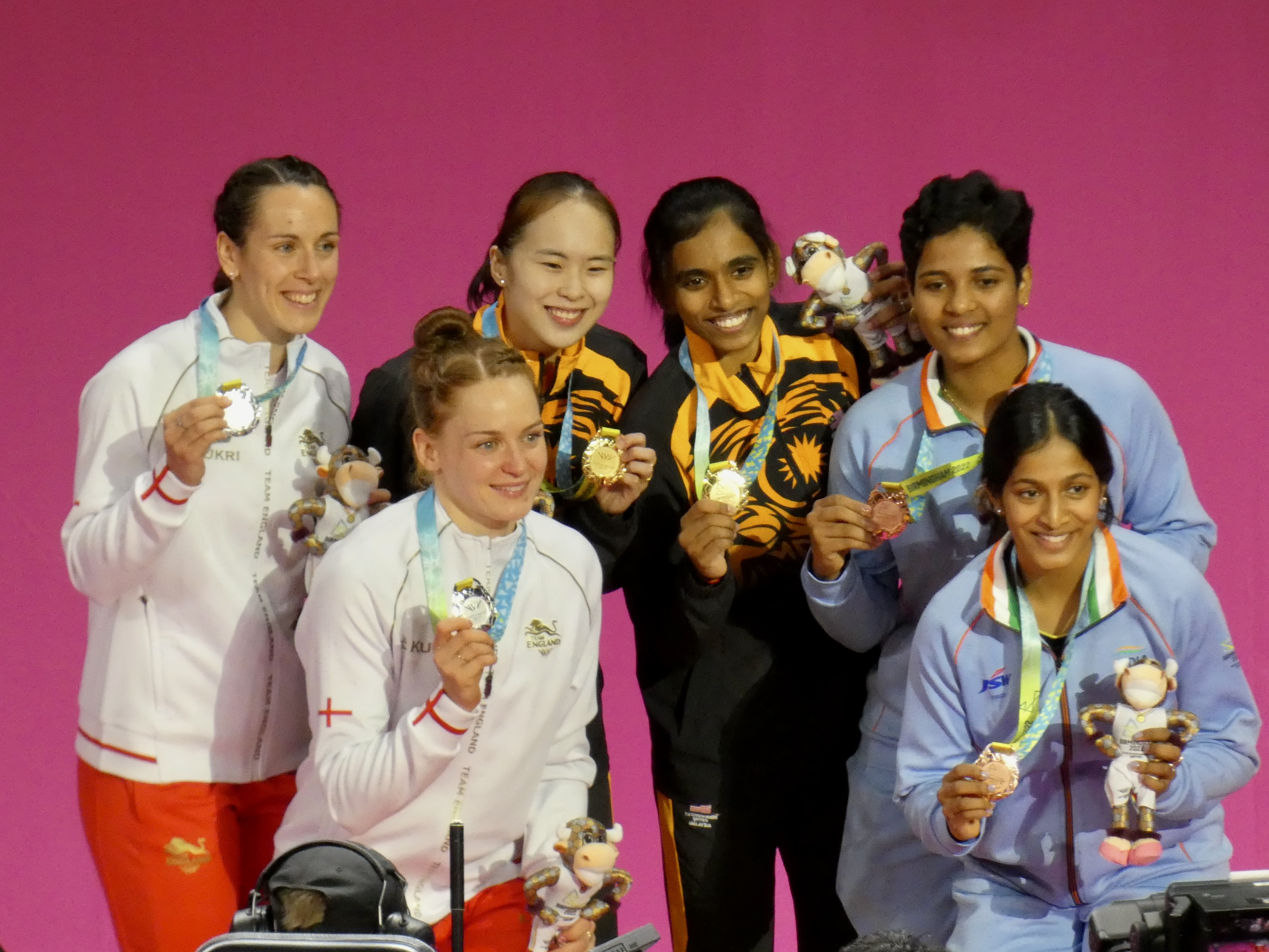
The six medallists in the women's badminton doubles at the 2022 Commonwealth Games in Birmingham. Left to right: Chloe Birch and Lauren Smith (England), Pearly Tan and Thinaah Muralitharan (Malaysia), Treesa Jolly and Gayatri Gopichand (India).

Women's doubles
Year	Venue	Partner	Opponent	Score	Result	Ref.
2022	National Exhibition Centre; Birmingham, England	(India) Treesa Jolly	(Australia) Chen Hsuan-yu (Australia) Gronya Somerville	21–15, 21–18	Bronze	

=== South Asian Games ===
Women's singles
Year	Venue	Opponent	Score	Result	Ref.
2019	Badminton Covered Hall; Pokhara, Nepal	(India) Ashmita Chaliha	18–21, 23–25	Silver	

=== BWF World Tour (3 titles, 1 runner-up) ===
The BWF World Tour, which was announced on 19 March 2017 and implemented in 2018, is a series of elite badminton tournaments sanctioned by the Badminton World Federation (BWF). The BWF World Tour is divided into levels of World Tour Finals, Super 1000, Super 750, Super 500, Super 300 (part of the HSBC World Tour), and the BWF Tour Super 100.

Women's doubles
Year	Tournament	Level	Partner	Opponent	Score	Result
2022	Syed Modi International	Super 300	(India) Treesa Jolly	(Malaysia) Anna Cheong (Malaysia) Teoh Mei Xing	12–21, 13–21	(silver) Runner-up
2022	Odisha Open	Super 100	(India) Treesa Jolly	(India) Sanyogita Ghorpade (India) Shruti Mishra	21–12, 21–10	(gold) Winner
2024	Syed Modi International	Super 300	(India) Treesa Jolly	(China) Bao Lijing (China) Li Qian	21–18, 21–11	(gold) Winner
2025	Syed Modi International	Super 300	(India) Treesa Jolly	(Japan) Kaho Osawa (Japan) Mai Tanabe	17–21, 21–13, 21–15	(gold) Winner

=== BWF International Challenge / Series (2 titles, 5 runners-up) ===
Women's singles
Year	Tournament	Opponent	Score	Result
2019	Nepal International	(India) Malvika Bansod	14–21, 18–21	(silver) Runner-up

Women's doubles
Year	Tournament	Partner	Opponent	Score	Result
2021	Polish International	(India) Treesa Jolly	(France) Margot Lambert (France) Anne Tran	10–21, 18–21	(silver) Runner-up
2021	India International Challenge	(India) Treesa Jolly	(India) Tanisha Crasto (India) Rutaparna Panda	23–21, 21–14	(gold) Winner
2021	Welsh International	(India) Treesa Jolly	(France) Margot Lambert (France) Anne Tran	20–22, 21–17, 14–21	(silver) Runner-up
2022	Bahrain International Challenge	(India) Treesa Jolly	(Indonesia) Lanny Tria Mayasari (Indonesia) Ribka Sugiarto	18–21, 16–21	(silver) Runner-up
2026	Philippine International	(India) Treesa Jolly	(Japan) Miki Kanehiro (Japan) Yuna Kato	16–21, 21–4, 21–17	(gold) Winner

Mixed doubles
Year	Tournament	Partner	Opponent	Score	Result
2021	India International Challenge	(India) Sai Pratheek K.	(India) Ishaan Bhatnagar (India) Tanisha Crasto	16–21, 19–21	(silver) Runner-up

BWF International Challenge tournament
BWF International Series tournament
BWF Future Series tournament

== Awards and nominations ==
Year	Award	Category	Result	Ref(s)
2024	BWF Awards	Best Dressed Female	Won	
2025	Times of India Sports Awards	Badminton Player of the Year Female	Nominated	
2026	Arjuna Award	Badminton (for 2025)	Won	

== See also ==
- Badminton in India
- India national badminton team
- List of Indian sportswomen
