= Philippine Badminton Association =

Sports governing body in the Philippines

- Formation: 1952
- Type: National Sport Association
- Headquarters: Pasig
- Affiliations: BAC, BWF
- Website: www.pbad.org.ph

The Philippine Badminton Association (PBAD) is the national governing body for badminton in the Philippines. The country joined International Badminton Federation in 1950 but it was not until 1952 the country organized its association.

In December 2022, the PBAD announced it would be national ranking system the following year in conjunction with the return of the Philippine Badminton Open.

== Tournaments ==
- Philippines Open Grand Prix Gold (2006–2009)
- Philippine International Challenge
- Philippine National Badminton Open

== See also ==
- Philippines national badminton team
