= Falkland Islands at the 2022 Commonwealth Games =

- Flag of the Falkland Islands
- CG code: FLK
- CGA: Falkland Islands Overseas Games Association

in Birmingham, England 28 July 2022 – 8 August 2022
- Competitors: 16 (8 men and 8 women) in 4 sports
- Flag bearers: Doug Clark; Daphne Arthur-Almond
- Medals: Gold 0 Silver 0 Bronze 0 Total 0

Commonwealth Games appearances (overview)
- 1982; 1986; 1990; 1994; 1998; 2002; 2006; 2010; 2014; 2018; 2022; 2026; 2030

The Falkland Islands was represented at the 2022 Commonwealth Games in Birmingham, England, United Kingdom by the Falkland Islands Overseas Games Association.

In total, 16 athletes including eight men and eight women represented the Falkland Islands in four different sports including badminton, cycling, lawn bowls and table tennis.

Badminton athlete Doug Clark and lawn bowler Daphne Arthur-Almond were the country's opening ceremony flagbearers.

== Competitors ==
In total, 16 athletes represented the Falkland Islands at the 2022 Commonwealth Games in Birmingham, England, United Kingdom across four different sports.

Sport	Men	Women	Total
Badminton	4	5	9
Cycling	1	0	1
Lawn bowls	2	3	5
Table tennis	1	0	1
Total	8	8	16

== Badminton ==
In total, nine Falkland Islander athletes participated in the badminton events – Ben Chater, Doug Clark and Duane March in the men's singles, the men's doubles and the mixed doubles, Vicky Chater in the women's singles, the women's doubles and the mixed doubles, Soraye March in the women's singles and the mixed doubles, Louise Williams in the women's singles and the women's doubles, Dwight Joshua in the men's doubles and the mixed doubles and Cheryl March and Laura Harada in the women's doubles and the mixed doubles.

The badminton events took place at the National Exhibition Centre (NEC) in Marston Green between 29 July and 8 August 2022.

Singles

Athlete	Event	First Round	Second Round	Third Round	Quarterfinal	Semifinal	Final / BM	
Athlete	Event	Opposition Score	Opposition Score	Opposition Score	Opposition Score	Opposition Score	Opposition Score	Rank
Ben Chater	Men's singles	Caden Kakora (RSA); L (10–21, 8–21)	did not advance					
Doug Clark	Men's singles	Ahmed Nibal (MDV); L (10–21, 11–21)	did not advance					
Duane March	Men's singles	Callum Smith (SCO); L (3–21, 4–21)	did not advance					
Vicky Chater	Women's singles	Ghazala Siddique (PAK); L (4–21, 3–21)	did not advance					
Soraye March	Women's singles	Bye	Deidre Laurens Jordaan (RSA); L (12–21, 1–21)	did not advance				
Louise Williams	Women's singles	Tamisha Williams (BAR); L (8–21, 10–21)	did not advance					

Doubles

Athlete	Event	First Round	Second Round	Third Round	Quarterfinal	Semifinal	Final / BM	
Athlete	Event	Opposition Score	Opposition Score	Opposition Score	Opposition Score	Opposition Score	Opposition Score	Rank
Ben Chater; Dwight Joshua	Men's doubles	—N/a	Ahmed Nibal & Ajfan Rasheed (MDV); L (14–21, 11–21)	did not advance				
Doug Clark; Duane March	Men's doubles	—N/a	Tran Hoang Pham & Jack Yu (AUS); L (5–21, 7–21)	did not advance				
Vicky Chater; Cheryl March	Women's doubles	—N/a	Prospera Nantuo & Cindy Tornyenyor (GHA); L (17–21, 20–22)	did not advance				
Laura Harada; Louise Williams	Women's doubles	—N/a	Julie MacPherson & Ciara Torrance (SCO); L (4–21, 5–21)	did not advance				
Ben Chater; Vicky Chater	Mixed doubles	Bye	Daniel Wanagaliya & Husina Kobugabe (UGA); L (13–21, 7–21)	did not advance				
Doug Clark; Cheryl March	Mixed doubles	Yingxiang Lin & Gronya Somerville (AUS); L (4–21, 3–21)	did not advance					
Duane March; Laura Harada	Mixed doubles	Samuel Ricketts & Tahlia Richardson (JAM); L (3–21, 4–21)	did not advance					
Dwight Joshua; Soraye March	Mixed doubles	Tran Hoang Pham & Angela Yu (AUS); L (2–21, 5–21)	did not advance					

== Cycling ==
In total, one Falkland Islander athlete participated in the cycling events – Jim Horton in the men's road race and the men's time trial.

The men's road race took place at Myton Fields in Warwick on 7 August 2022. The men's time trial took place at West Park in Wolverhampton on 4 August 2022.

Athlete	Event	Time	Rank
Jim Horton	Road race	DNF	
Jim Horton	Time trial	1:02:45.73	46

== Lawn bowls ==
In total, five Falkland Islander athletes participated in the lawn bowls events – Chris Locke in the men's singles and the men's doubles, Garry Tyrell in the men's doubles, Daphne Arthur-Almond in the women's singles and the women's triples and Andrea Stanworth and Trudi Clarke in the women's triples.

The lawn bowls events took place at Victoria Park in Leamington Spa between 29 July and 6 August 2022.

Men

Athlete	Event	Group Stage					Quarterfinal	Semifinal	Final / BM	
Athlete	Event	Opposition Score	Opposition Score	Opposition Score	Opposition Score	Rank	Opposition Score	Opposition Score	Opposition Score	Rank
Chris Locke	Singles	McLean (SCO); L 5―21	Borgohain (IND); L 5-21	Davis (JEY); L 7-21	McIlroy (NZL); L 5―21	5	did not advance			
Garry Tyrell; Chris Locke	Pairs	Cook Islands; L 12–23	India; L 4–36	England; L 5–47	Malaysia; L 6–35	5	did not advance			

Women

Athlete	Event	Group Stage					Quarterfinal	Semifinal	Final / BM	
Athlete	Event	Opposition Score	Opposition Score	Opposition Score	Opposition Score	Rank	Opposition Score	Opposition Score	Opposition Score	Rank
Daphne Arthur-Almond	Singles	Daniels (WAL); L 2–21	Choudhury (IND); W 21–20	O'Neill (NIR); L 2–21	Hoggan (SCO); L 5–21	5	did not advance			
Andrea Stanworth; Daphne Arthur-Almond; Trudi Clarke	Triples	Northern Ireland; L 10 - 22	Singapore; L 10 - 23	Australia; L 8 - 29	South Africa; L 14 - 20	5	did not advance			

== Table tennis ==
In total, one Falkland Islander athlete participated in the table tennis events – Javier Sotomayor in the men's singles.

The table tennis events took place at the NEC in Marston Green between 29 July and 8 August 2022.

Athletes	Event	Group stage			Round of 32	Round of 16	Quarterfinal	Semifinal	Final / BM	
Athletes	Event	Opposition Score	Opposition Score	Rank	Opposition Score	Opposition Score	Opposition Score	Opposition Score	Opposition Score	Rank
Javier Sotomayor	Men's singles	Cogill (RSA); L 0 - 4	Chambers (AUS); L 0 - 4	3	did not advance					
