= Swimming at the 2022 Commonwealth Games – Men's 200 metre breaststroke =

Men's 200 metre breaststroke at the 2022 Commonwealth Games
- Venue: Sandwell Aquatics Centre
- Dates: 29 July
- Competitors: 20 from 16 nations
- Winning time: 2:08.07

Medalists
gold medal	Zac Stubblety-Cook	Australia
silver medal	James Wilby	England
bronze medal	Ross Murdoch	Scotland

The men's 200 metre breaststroke event at the 2022 Commonwealth Games will be held on 29 July at the Sandwell Aquatics Centre.

== Records ==
Prior to this competition, the existing world, Commonwealth and Games records were as follows:

World record	Zac Stubblety-Cook (AUS)	2:05.95	Adelaide, Australia	19 May 2022
Commonwealth record	Zac Stubblety-Cook (AUS)	2:05.95	Adelaide, Australia	19 May 2022
Games record	Ross Murdoch (SCO)	2:07.30	Glasgow, United Kingdom	24 July 2014

== Schedule ==
The schedule is as follows:

All times are British Summer Time (UTC+1)

Date	Time	Round
Friday 29 July 2022	12:16	Heats
Friday 29 July 2022	21:07	Final

== Results ==
=== Heats ===
Rank	Heat	Lane	Name	Nationality	Time	Notes
1	3	4	Zac Stubblety-Cook	Australia	2:09.88	Q
2	3	5	Ross Murdoch	Scotland	2:11.35	Q
3	1	4	James Wilby	England	2:11.76	Q
4	2	4	Matthew Wilson	Australia	2:12.02	Q
5	1	5	Maximillian Ang Wei	Singapore	2:12.27	Q
6	2	4	James Dergousoff	Canada	2:14.36	Q
7	2	5	Greg Butler	England	2:15.01	Q
8	3	6	Ryan Maskelyne	Papua New Guinea	2:15.91	Q
9	1	3	Kyle Booth	Wales	2:16.43	R
10	3	3	Taichi Vakasama	Fiji	2:19.24	R
11	2	6	Robbie Jones	Jersey	2:20.11	
12	1	6	Brandon Schuster	Samoa	2:22.37	
13	3	2	Luis Sebastian Weekes	Barbados	2:22.71	
14	2	2	Charlie-Joe Hallett	Guernsey	2:24.01	
15	3	7	Ronny Hallett	Guernsey	2:26.46	
16	1	2	Caio Lobo	Mozambique	2:28.22	
17	2	7	Kito Campbell	Jamaica	2:29.95	
18	1	7	Zach Moyo	Zambia	2:44.35	
19	2	1	Omar Darboe	The Gambia	3:03.86	
20	3	1	Mohamed Rihan Shiham	Maldives	3:03.94	

=== Final ===
Rank	Lane	Name	Nationality	Time	Notes
1st place, gold medalist(s)	4	Zac Stubblety-Cook	Australia	2:08.07	
2nd place, silver medalist(s)	3	James Wilby	England	2:08.59	
3rd place, bronze medalist(s)	5	Ross Murdoch	Scotland	2:10.41	
4	6	Matthew Wilson	Australia	2:10.57	
5	1	Greg Butler	England	2:13.06	
6	2	Maximillian Ang Wei	Singapore	2:13.25	
7	7	James Dergousoff	Canada	2:13.85	
8	8	Ryan Maskelyne	Papua New Guinea	2:16.98	
