= Philippine International (badminton) =

Open tournament in Mandaluyong, Philippines

The Philippine International (officially registered as the Philippine International Challenge) is an open international badminton tournament held in Mandaluyong, Metro Manila, Philippines. Organized by the Philippine Badminton Association (PBAD), the event is sanctioned by the Badminton World Federation (BWF) and Badminton Asia. Classified as a Grade 3, Level 1 event on the BWF Continental Circuit, the tournament awards ranking points toward the official BWF World Rankings.

== History ==
The tournament was established in 2026 after PBAD submitted proposals to the BWF through Badminton Asia. Spearheaded by PBAD Secretary General Shawntel Nieto and Program Director Kennie Asuncion, the event was created to give domestic athletes international ranking exposure on home soil and promote badminton in the country. The tournament received backing from business executive Manny Pangilinan and presentation support from the Philippine Sports Commission (PSC).

The inaugural edition took place from 28 July to 2 August 2026, at the Gameville Central Park in Mandaluyong, Metro Manila, drawing competitors from 28 countries across five disciplines. Titles in the first edition were divided among three nations: India, Malaysia, and Thailand. The senior event was immediately followed by the country's hosting of the inaugural Philippine Junior International Series at the same venue.

== List of winners ==
Year	Men's singles	Women's singles	Men's doubles	Women's doubles	Mixed doubles	Ref
2026	(India) Ginpaul Sonna	(Thailand) Sarunrak Vitidsarn	(Malaysia) Choong Hon Jian (Malaysia) Wong Vin Sean	(India) Treesa Jolly (India) Gayatri Gopichand	(Malaysia) Goh Boon Zhe (Malaysia) Dania Sofea	

== Performances by nation ==
As of 2026 edition

No	Nation	MS	WS	MD	WD	XD	Total
1	India	1			1		2
1	Malaysia			1		1	2
3	Thailand		1				1
Total		1	1	1	1	1	5

== See also ==
- Philippines Open (badminton)
