= Maldives at the 2022 Commonwealth Games =

- Flag of Maldives
- CG code: MDV
- CGA: Maldives Olympic Committee

in Birmingham, England 28 July 2022 – 8 August 2022
- Competitors: 24 (11 men and 13 women) in 5 sports
- Flag bearers: Zayan Zaki; Fathimath Nimal
- Medals: Gold 0 Silver 0 Bronze 0 Total 0

Commonwealth Games appearances (overview)
- 1986; 1990; 1994; 1998; 2002; 2006; 2010; 2014; 2018; 2022; 2026; 2030

The Maldives was represented at the 2022 Commonwealth Games in Birmingham, England, United Kingdom by the Maldives Olympic Committee. It was the country's first appearance since it was re-admitted to the Commonwealth of Nations.

In total, 28 athletes including 13 men and 15 women represented the Maldives in five different sports including athletics, badminton, beach volleyball, swimming and table tennis.

Zayan Zaki and Fathimath Nimal were the country's flagbearers during the opening ceremony.

== Competitors ==
In total, 28 athletes represented the Maldives at the 2022 Commonwealth Games in Birmingham, England, United Kingdom across five different sports.

Sport	Men	Women	Total
Athletics	1	5	6
Badminton	4	2	6
Beach volleyball	2	0	2
Swimming	3	2	5
Table tennis	1	4	5
Total	11	13	24

== Athletics ==
In total, six Maldivian athletes participated in the athletics events – Hassan Saaid in the men's 100 m and the men's 200 m, Mariyam Ali in the women's 100 m, Aishath Hassan in the women's 100 m, the women's 400 m and the women's 4 × 100 m relay, Mariyam Hussain in the women's 100 m and the women's 4 × 100 m relay, Aminath Mohamed in the women's 200 m, the women's 400 m and the women's 4 × 100 m relay and Rifa Mohamed in the women's 200 m and the women's 4 × 100 m relay.

The athletics events took place at Alexander Stadium in Perry Bar, Birmingham between 30 July and 7 August 2022.

Men

Athlete	Event	Heat		Semifinal		Final	
Athlete	Event	Result	Rank	Result	Rank	Result	Rank
Hassan Saaid	100 m	10.75	49	did not advance			
Hassan Saaid	200 m	22.32	45	did not advance			

Women

Athlete	Event	Heat		Semifinal		Final	
Athlete	Event	Result	Rank	Result	Rank	Result	Rank
Mariyam Ali	100 m	12.80	45	did not advance			
Aishath Hassan	100 m	12.17	40	did not advance			
Mariyam Hussain	100 m	12.86	46	did not advance			
Aminath Mohamed	200 m	26.79	35	did not advance			
Rifa Mohamed	200 m	26.87	36	did not advance			
Aishath Hassan	400 m	58.70	28	did not advance			
Aminath Mohamed	400 m	1:01.49	30	did not advance			
Mariyam Hussain; Rifa Mohamed; Aishath Hassan; Aminath Mohamed	4 × 100 m relay	49.19	12	—N/a		did not advance	

== Badminton ==
In total, six Maldivian athletes participated in the badminton events – Ahmed Nibal in the men's singles, the mixed doubles and the mixed team, Ajfan Rasheed and Zayan Zaki in the men's singles, the men's doubles, the mixed doubles and the mixed team, Rishwan Shiyam in the men's doubles and Nabaaha Abdul Razzaq and Nabeeha Abdul Razzaq in the women's singles, the women's doubles, the mixed doubles and the mixed team.

The badminton events took place at the National Exhibition Centre (NEC) in Marston Green between 29 July and 8 August 2022.

Singles

Athlete	Event	Round of 64	Round of 32	Round of 16	Quarterfinal	Semifinal	Final / BM	
Athlete	Event	Opposition Score	Opposition Score	Opposition Score	Opposition Score	Opposition Score	Opposition Score	Rank
Ahmed Nibal	Men's singles	Clark (FLK); W (21–10, 21–11)	Conteh (SLE); W (21–4, 21–3)	Ricketts (JAM); L (9-21, 6-21)	did not advance			
Ajfan Rasheed	Men's singles	Bye	Abdul-Samad (GHA); W (21–16, 21–14)	Ng (MAS); L (7-21, 9-21)	did not advance			
Zayan Zaki	Men's singles	Mulenga (ZAM); L (16–21, 8–21)	did not advance					
Nabaaha Abdul Razzaq	Women's singles	Bye	Sindhu (IND); L (4-21, 11–21)	did not advance				
Nabeeha Abdul Razzaq	Women's singles	Bye	Khan (SGP); L (10–21, 12–21)	did not advance				

Doubles

Athlete	Event	Round of 64	Round of 32	Round of 16	Quarterfinal	Semifinal	Final / BM	
Athlete	Event	Opposition Score	Opposition Score	Opposition Score	Opposition Score	Opposition Score	Opposition Score	Rank
Ahmed Nibal; Ajfan Rasheed	Men's doubles	—N/a	Chater & Joshua (FLK); W (21–14, 21–11)	Dias & Goonethilleka (SRI); L (12–21, 8-21)	did not advance			
Zayan Zaki; Rishwan Shiyam	Men's doubles	—N/a	C Grimley & M Grimley (SCO); L (5-21, 7-21)	did not advance				
Nabeeha Abdul Razzaq; Nabaaha Abdul Razzaq	Women's doubles	—N/a	Ea & Yu (AUS); L (13–21, 15–21)	did not advance				
Ajfan Rasheed; Nabeeha Abdul Razzaq	Mixed doubles	Kwek & Jin (SGP); L (3–21, 12–21)	did not advance					
Zayan Zaki; Nabaaha Abdul Razzaq	Mixed doubles	C Grimley & O'Donnell (SCO); L (8–21, 9–21)	did not advance					

Mixed team

Team	Event	Group stage				Quarterfinal	Semifinal	Final / BM	
Team	Event	Opposition Score	Opposition Score	Opposition Score	Rank	Opposition Score	Opposition Score	Opposition Score	Rank
Maldives	Mixed team	Scotland; L 0–5	Canada; L 0–5	Uganda; L 1–4	4	did not advance			

== Beach volleyball ==
In total, two Maldivian athletes participated in the beach volleyball events – Sajid Ismail and Adam Naseem in the men's tournament.

The beach volleyball events took place at Smithfield, Birmingham between 30 July and 7 August 2022.

Athletes	Event	Preliminary Round				Quarterfinals	Semifinals	Final / BM	Rank
Athletes	Event	Opposition Score	Opposition Score	Opposition Score	Rank	Opposition Score	Opposition Score	Opposition Score	Rank
Sajid Ismail; Adam Naseem	Men's	Burnett / McHugh (AUS); L 0 - 2	Ntagengwa / Gatsinze (RWA); L 1 - 2	Williams / Goldschmidt (RSA); L 1 - 2	4	did not advance			

== Swimming ==
In total, five Maldivian athletes participated in the swimming events – Mubal Azzam Ibrahim in the men's 50 m breaststroke, the men's 100 m breaststroke, the men's 200 m individual medley, the mixed 4 × 100 m freestyle relay and the mixed 4 × 100 m medley relay, Aan Hussain in the men's 50 m freestyle, the men's 100 m freestyle, the men's 50 m backstroke, the men's 100 m backstroke, the men's 100 m butterfly, the mixed 4 × 100 m freestyle relay and the mixed 4 × 100 m medley relay, Rihan Shiham in the men's 50 m backstroke, the men's 100 m backstroke, the men's 200 m backstroke, the men's 200 m breaststroke, the men's 100 m butterfly, the men's 200 m butterfly and the men's 400 m individual medley, Hamna Ahmed in the women's 50 m freestyle, women's 50 m backstroke, the women's 100 m backstroke, the women's 50 m butterfly, the mixed 4 × 100 m freestyle relay and the mixed 4 × 100 m medley relay and Aishath Sausan in the women's 50 m freestyle, the women's 50 m backstroke, the women's 100 m backstroke, the women's 200 m backstroke, the women's 50 m butterfly, the mixed 4 × 100 m freestyle relay and the mixed 4 × 100 m medley relay.

The swimming events took place at the Sandwell Aquatics Centre in Londonderry, Smethwick between 29 July and 3 August 2022.

Men

Athlete	Event	Heat		Semifinal		Final	
Athlete	Event	Time	Rank	Time	Rank	Time	Rank
Mubal Azzam Ibrahim	50 m breaststroke	34.62	38	did not advance			
Mubal Azzam Ibrahim	100 m breaststroke	1:17.19	35	did not advance			
Mubal Azzam Ibrahim	200 m individual medley	2:23.69	22	—N/a		did not advance	
Aan Hussain	50 m freestyle	24.82	46	did not advance			
Aan Hussain	100 m freestyle	55.49	58	did not advance			
Aan Hussain	50 m backstroke	30.08	41	did not advance			
Aan Hussain	100 m backstroke	1:07.07	36	did not advance			
Aan Hussain	100 m butterfly	1:03.35	45	did not advance			
Rihan Shiham	50 m backstroke	32.41	44	did not advance			
Rihan Shiham	100 m backstroke	1:11.87	37	did not advance			
Rihan Shiham	200 m backstroke	2:37.33	20	—N/a		did not advance	
Rihan Shiham	200 m breaststroke	3:03.94	20	—N/a		did not advance	
Rihan Shiham	100 m butterfly	1:05.12	47	did not advance			
Rihan Shiham	200 m butterfly	2:37.81	20	—N/a		did not advance	
Rihan Shiham	400 m individual medley	5:35.70	10	—N/a		did not advance	

Women

Athlete	Event	Heat		Semifinal		Final	
Athlete	Event	Time	Rank	Time	Rank	Time	Rank
Hamna Ahmed	50 m freestyle	30.88	64	did not advance			
Hamna Ahmed	50 m backstroke	34.51	35	did not advance			
Hamna Ahmed	100 m backstroke	1:22.02	30	did not advance			
Hamna Ahmed	50 m butterfly	34.16	50	did not advance			
Aishath Sausan	50 m freestyle	30.81	63	did not advance			
Aishath Sausan	50 m backstroke	34.76	36	did not advance			
Aishath Sausan	100 m backstroke	1:20.49	29	did not advance			
Aishath Sausan	200 m backstroke	2:58.24	15	—N/a		did not advance	
Aishath Sausan	50 m butterfly	32.94	49	did not advance			

Mixed

Athlete	Event	Heat		Final	
Athlete	Event	Time	Rank	Time	Rank
Hamna Ahmed; Mubal Azzam Ibrahim; Aishath Sausan; Aan Hussain	4 × 100 m freestyle relay	4:14.91	17	did not advance	
Aishath Sausan; Aan Hussain; Mubal Azzam Ibrahim; Hamna Ahmed	4 × 100 m medley relay	4:57.22	17	did not advance	

== Table tennis ==
In total, five Maldivian athletes participated in the table tennis events – Moosa Ahmed in the men's singles and the mixed doubles, Fathimath Ali and Fathimath Nimal in the women's singles, the women's doubles and the women's team, Aishath Nazim in the women's singles, the women's doubles, the mixed doubles and the women's team and Muizzu Malaak in the women's doubles and the women's team.

The table tennis events took place at the NEC in Marston Green between 29 July and 8 August 2022.

Singles

Athletes	Event	Group stage				Round of 32	Round of 16	Quarterfinal	Semifinal	Final / BM	
Athletes	Event	Opposition Score	Opposition Score	Opposition Score	Rank	Opposition Score	Opposition Score	Opposition Score	Opposition Score	Opposition Score	Rank
Moosa Ahmed	Men's singles	Abrefa (GHA); L 0 - 4	Sabbir (BAN); L 3 - 4	—N/a	3	did not advance					
Fathimath Ali	Women's singles	Maphanga (RSA); W 4 - 0	Thomas (WAL); L 0 - 4	—N/a	2	did not advance					
Aishath Nazim	Women's singles	Sinon (SEY); W 4 - 0	Nakhumitsa (UGA); W 4 - 0	—N/a	1 Q	Jee (AUS); L 0 - 4	did not advance				
Fathimath Nimal	Women's singles	Fu (CAN); L 2 - 4	Li (FIJ); L 2 - 4	Qwea (VAN); W 4 - 1	3	did not advance					

Doubles

Athletes	Event	Round of 64	Round of 32	Round of 16	Quarterfinal	Semifinal	Final / BM	
Athletes	Event	Opposition Score	Opposition Score	Opposition Score	Opposition Score	Opposition Score	Opposition Score	Rank
Fathimath Ali; Aishath Nazim	Women's doubles	Bye	Cumberbatch / Velox (SVG); L WO	did not advance				
Fathimath Nimal; Muizzu Malaak	Women's doubles	Bye	Hosenally / Jalim (MRI); L 0 - 3	did not advance				
Aishath Nazim; Moosa Ahmed	Mixed doubles	Chan / Hosenally (MRI); L 2 - 3	did not advance					

Team

Athletes	Event	Group stage				Quarterfinal	Semifinal	Final / BM	
Athletes	Event	Opposition Score	Opposition Score	Opposition Score	Rank	Opposition Score	Opposition Score	Opposition Score	Rank
Muizza Malaak; Aishath Nazim; Fathimath Nimal; Fathimath Ali	Women's team	Mauritius; L 2 - 3	Malaysia; L 0 - 3	Australia; L 0 - 3	4	did not advance			
