= Table tennis at the 2022 Commonwealth Games – Men's singles =

Table tennis – Men's singles at the 2022 Commonwealth Games
- Venue: National Exhibition Centre
- Dates: 3 - 8 August 2022
- Competitors: 63 from 29 nations

Medalists
gold medal	Sharath Kamal	India
silver medal	Liam Pitchford	England
bronze medal	Sathiyan Gnanasekaran	India

Table tennis men's singles at the 2022 Commonwealth Games is held at the National Exhibition Centre at Birmingham, England from 3 to 8 August 2022.

== Seeds ==
The seeds for the tournament were:

1. Quadri Aruna (NGR) (quarterfinals)
2. Liam Pitchford (ENG) (final, Silver medalist)
3. Sathiyan Gnanasekaran (IND) (Semi-finals, Bronze medalist)
4. Sharath Kamal (IND) (champion, Gold medalist)
5. Eugene Wang (CAN) (round of 16)
6. Paul Drinkhall (ENG) (Semi-finals, Fourth place)
7. Sam Walker (ENG) (quarterfinals)
8. Bode Abiodun (NGR) (round of 16)

9. Olajide Omotayo (NGR) (round of 16)
10. Pang Yew En Koen (SGP) (round of 16)
11. Jeremy Hazin (CAN) (round of 16)
12. Clarence Chew (SGP) (round of 16)
13. Brian Chan Yook Fo (MRI) (round of 32)
14. Quek Yong Izaac (SGP) (quarterfinals)
15. Sanil Shetty (IND) (quarterfinals)
16. Nicholas Lum (AUS) (round of 16)

Click on the seed number of a player to go to their draw section.

== Main draw ==
=== Finals ===
Semifinals
6	Paul Drinkhall (ENG)	8	8	11	7	11	8
4	Sharath Kamal (IND)	11	11	8	11	9	11
3	Sathiyan Gnanasekaran (IND)	5	11	8	9	9
2	Liam Pitchford (ENG)	11	4	11	11	11

Gold medal match
4	Sharath Kamal (IND)	11	11	11	11	11
2	Liam Pitchford (ENG)	13	7	2	6	8
Bronze medal match
6	Paul Drinkhall (ENG)	9	3	5	11	11	12	9
3	Sathiyan Gnanasekaran (IND)	11	11	11	8	9	10	11

=== Top half ===
==== Section 1 ====
Round of 32
Gavin Rumgay (SCO)	11	11	11	11
13	Brian Chan Yook Fo (MRI)	8	5	3	9
12	Clarence Chew (SGP)	9	11	11	11	6	8	11
Dillon Chambers (AUS)	11	6	3	2	11	11	3
Fahad Khawaja (PAK)	6	5	3	4
6	Paul Drinkhall (ENG)	11	11	11	11

Round of 16
1	Quadri Aruna (NGR)	11	11	11	11
Gavin Rumgay (SCO)	2	8	3	9
12	Clarence Chew (SGP)	5	5	3	9
6	Paul Drinkhall (ENG)	11	11	11	11

Quarterfinals
1	Quadri Aruna (NGR)	10	11	7	4	6
6	Paul Drinkhall (ENG)	12	8	11	11	11

==== Section 2 ====
Round of 32
5	Eugene Wang (CAN)	8	11	11	11	11
Callum Evans (WAL)	11	6	6	3	6
Owen Cathcart (NIR)	6	12	7	6	7
14	Quek Yong Izaac (SGP)	11	10	11	11	11
9	Olajide Omotayo (NGR)	8	11	5	11	7	11	11
Leong Chee Feng (MAS)	11	8	11	8	11	5	5
Finn Luu (AUS)	10	8	7	6
4	Sharath Kamal (IND)	12	11	11	11

Round of 16
5	Eugene Wang (CAN)	5	5	11	11	11	9	6
14	Quek Yong Izaac (SGP)	11	11	8	6	6	11	11
9	Olajide Omotayo (NGR)	11	3	6	6	14	9
4	Sharath Kamal (IND)	8	11	11	11	12	11

Quarterfinals
14	Quek Yong Izaac (SGP)	6	7	4	7
4	Sharath Kamal (IND)	11	11	11	11

=== Bottom half ===
==== Section 3 ====
Round of 32
3	Sathiyan Gnanasekaran (IND)	11	11	12	13
Paul McCreery (NIR)	9	9	10	11
Choong Javen (MAS)	7	10	9	10
16	Nicholas Lum (AUS)	11	12	11	12
11	Jeremy Hazin (CAN)	11	11	12	11
Akhilen Yogarajah (MRI)	5	8	10	8
Kevin Farley (BAR)	7	7	4	10
7	Sam Walker (ENG)	11	11	11	12

Round of 16
3	Sathiyan Gnanasekaran (IND)	11	7	11	9	12	11
16	Nicholas Lum (AUS)	6	11	9	11	10	6
11	Jeremy Hazin (CAN)	6	6	4	6
7	Sam Walker (ENG)	11	11	11	11

Quarterfinals
3	Sathiyan Gnanasekaran (IND)	11	11	11	8	10	11
7	Sam Walker (ENG)	5	7	5	11	12	9

==== Section 4 ====
Round of 32
8	Bode Abiodun (NGR)	11	6	11	11	7	11
Colin Dalgleish (SCO)	8	11	6	5	11	7
Derek Abrefa (GHA)	10	12	4	5
15	Sanil Shetty (IND)	12	14	11	11
10	Pang Yew En Koen (SGP)	10	11	11	11	11
Hongtao Chen (CAN)	12	9	8	8	2
Wong Qi Shen (MAS)	10	5	11	5	7
2	Liam Pitchford (ENG)	12	11	9	11	11

Round of 16
8	Bode Abiodun (NGR)	11	8	8	11	13	8
15	Sanil Shetty (IND)	9	11	11	9	15	11
10	Pang Yew En Koen (SGP)	15	6	6	2
2	Liam Pitchford (ENG)	17	11	11	11

Quarterfinals
15	Sanil Shetty (IND)	11	6	8	8	4
2	Liam Pitchford (ENG)	9	11	11	11	11

== Preliminary stage ==
=== Group 1 ===
Name	Pld	MW	ML	GW	GL	Pts
Owen Cathcart (NIR)	2	2	0	8	0	4
Shemar Britton (GUY)	2	1	1	4	5	3
Ramhimlian Bawm (BAN)	2	0	2	1	8	2

Date	Time	Player 1	Score	Player 2	Set 1	Set 2	Set 3	Set 4	Set 5	Set 6	Set 7
3 August	10:05	Owen Cathcart (NIR)	4–0	Shemar Britton (GUY)	11–7	12–10	11–4	11–5			
3 August	11:50	Owen Cathcart (NIR)	4–0	Ramhimlian Bawm (BAN)	11–3	11–5	11–2	11–8			
3 August	13:35	Shemar Britton (GUY)	4–1	Ramhimlian Bawm (BAN)	11–6	11–8	11–3	8–11	11–3		

=== Group 2 ===
Name	Pld	MW	ML	GW	GL	Pts
Finn Luu (AUS)	2	2	0	8	0	4
Zak Wilson (NIR)	2	1	1	4	5	3
Jonathan van Lange (GUY)	2	0	2	1	8	2

Date	Time	Player 1	Score	Player 2	Set 1	Set 2	Set 3	Set 4	Set 5	Set 6	Set 7
3 August	10:05	Finn Luu (AUS)	4–0	Zak Wilson (NIR)	17–15	11–8	11–8	11–8			
3 August	11:50	Zak Wilson (NIR)	4–1	Jonathan van Lange (GUY)	11–8	8–11	11–5	14–12	11–6		
3 August	13:35	Finn Luu (AUS)	4–0	Jonathan van Lange (GUY)	11–4	11–6	11–3	11–4			

=== Group 3 ===
Name	Pld	MW	ML	GW	GL	Pts
Gavin Rumgay (SCO)	2	2	0	8	0	4
Jordan Wykes (JEY)	2	1	1	4	6	3
Muhammad Baboolall (MRI)	2	0	2	2	8	2

Date	Time	Player 1	Score	Player 2	Set 1	Set 2	Set 3	Set 4	Set 5	Set 6	Set 7
3 August	10:05	Gavin Rumgay (SCO)	4–0	Muhammad Baboolall (MRI)	12–10	11–8	11–6	11–9			
3 August	11:50	Gavin Rumgay (SCO)	4–0	Jordan Wykes (JEY)	11–5	11–9	11–3	11–8			
3 August	13:35	Jordan Wykes (JEY)	4–2	Muhammad Baboolall (MRI)	11–2	11–4	15–17	11–3	11–13	16–14	

=== Group 4 ===
Name	Pld	MW	ML	GW	GL	Pts
Derek Abrefa (GHA)	2	2	0	8	0	4
Md Rifat Sabbir (BAN)	2	1	1	4	7	3
Moosa Munsif Ahmed (MDV)	2	0	2	3	8	2

Date	Time	Player 1	Score	Player 2	Set 1	Set 2	Set 3	Set 4	Set 5	Set 6	Set 7
3 August	10:05	Derek Abrefa (GHA)	4–0	Moosa Munsif Ahmed (MDV)	11–7	11–4	11–9	11–8			
3 August	11:50	Md Rifat Sabbir (BAN)	4–3	Moosa Munsif Ahmed (MDV)	8–11	5–11	11–6	11–4	7–11	11–8	11–7
3 August	13:35	Derek Abrefa (GHA)	4–0	Md Rifat Sabbir (BAN)	11–9	11–7	11–8	11–4			

=== Group 5 ===
Name	Pld	MW	ML	GW	GL	Pts
Wong Qi Shen (MAS)	2	2	0	8	0	4
Tyrese Knight (BAR)	2	1	1	4	4	3
Geoffrey Loi (PNG)	2	0	2	0	8	2

Date	Time	Player 1	Score	Player 2	Set 1	Set 2	Set 3	Set 4	Set 5	Set 6	Set 7
3 August	10:05	Tyrese Knight (BAR)	4–0	Geoffrey Loi (PNG)	11–5	11–3	11–2	11–3			
3 August	11:50	Wong Qi Shen (MAS)	4–0	Geoffrey Loi (PNG)	11–2	11–4	11–1	11–3			
3 August	13:35	Wong Qi Shen (MAS)'	4–0	Tyrese Knight (BAR)	13–11	11–5	11–7	11–5			

=== Group 6 ===
Name	Pld	MW	ML	GW	GL	Pts
Callum Evans (WAL)	2	2	0	8	0	4
Sharpel Elia (CYP)	2	1	1	4	4	3
Mick Crea (SEY)	2	0	2	0	8	2

Date	Time	Player 1	Score	Player 2	Set 1	Set 2	Set 3	Set 4	Set 5	Set 6	Set 7
3 August	10:05	Callum Evans (WAL)	4–0	Mick Crea (SEY)	11–9	11–6	11–4	11–4			
3 August	11:50	Sharpel Elia (CYP)	4–0	Mick Crea (SEY)	11–5	11–5	11–5	11–6			
3 August	13:35	Callum Evans (WAL)	4–0	Sharpel Elia (CYP)	11–6	11–7	11–3	11–4			

=== Group 7 ===
Name	Pld	MW	ML	GW	GL	Pts
Akhilen Yogarajah (MRI)	2	2	0	8	2	4
Brian Mutua (KEN)	1	1	1	6	5	3
Ramon Maxwell (BAR)	2	0	2	1	8	2

Date	Time	Player 1	Score	Player 2	Set 1	Set 2	Set 3	Set 4	Set 5	Set 6	Set 7
3 August	10:05	Akhilen Yogarajah (MRI)	4–0	Ramon Maxwell (BAR)	11–2	11–3	11–2	11–3			
3 August	11:50	Akhilen Yogarajah (MRI)	4–2	Brian Mutua (KEN)	9–22	11–8	11–7	9–11	11–2	15–13	
3 August	13:35	Brian Mutua (KEN)	4–1	Ramon Maxwell (BAR)	11–9	11–7	11–8	8–11	11–6		

=== Group 8 ===
Name	Pld	MW	ML	GW	GL	Pts
Hongtao Chen (CAN)	2	2	0	8	2	4
Marios Yiangou (CYP)	2	1	1	6	4	3
Shaun Jones (RSA)	2	0	2	0	8	2

Date	Time	Player 1	Score	Player 2	Set 1	Set 2	Set 3	Set 4	Set 5	Set 6	Set 7
3 August	10:05	Hongtao Chen (CAN)	4–0	Shaun Jones (RSA)	11–2	11–4	11–4	11–8			
3 August	11:50	Marios Yiangou (CYP)	4–0	Shaun Jones (RSA)	11–4	11–6	11–2	11–4			
3 August	13:35	Hongtao Chen (CAN)	4–2	Marios Yiangou (CYP)	11–9	9–11	11–7	11–5	9–11	11–3	

=== Group 9 ===
Name	Pld	MW	ML	GW	GL	Pts
Dillon Chambers (AUS)	2	2	0	8	0	4
Theo Cogill (RSA)	2	1	1	4	4	3
Javier Sotomayor (FLK)	2	0	2	0	8	2

Date	Time	Player 1	Score	Player 2	Set 1	Set 2	Set 3	Set 4	Set 5	Set 6	Set 7
3 August	16:35	Dillon Chambers (AUS)	4–0	Theo Cogill (RSA)	11–5	11–3	11–7	11–6			
3 August	18:30	Theo Cogill (RSA)	4–0'	Javier Sotomayor (FLK)	11–5	11–3	11–5	11–9			
3 August	20:40	Dillon Chambers (AUS)	4–0	Javier Sotomayor (FLK)	11–4	11–2	11–3	11–0			

=== Group 10 ===
Name	Pld	MW	ML	GW	GL	Pts
Leong Chee Feng (MAS)	2	2	0	8	0	4
De Andre Calderon (LCA)	2	1	1	4	6	3
Kane Watson (JAM)	2	0	2	2	8	2

Date	Time	Player 1	Score	Player 2	Set 1	Set 2	Set 3	Set 4	Set 5	Set 6	Set 7
3 August	16:35	De Andre Calderon (LCA)	4–2	Kane Watson (JAM)	11–4	11–9	11–7	9–11	7–11	11–1	
3 August	18:20	Leong Chee Feng (MAS)	4–0	De Andre Calderon (LCA)	11–4	11–2	11–9	11–5			
3 August	20:40	Leong Chee Feng (MAS)	4–0	Kane Watson (JAM)	11–3	11–8	11–6	11–9			

=== Group 11 ===
Name	Pld	MW	ML	GW	GL	Pts
Kevin Farley (BAR)	2	2	0	8	3	4
Chetan Nathoo (RSA)	2	1	1	7	4	3
Stephen Reilly (FIJ)	2	0	2	0	8	2

Date	Time	Player 1	Score	Player 2	Set 1	Set 2	Set 3	Set 4	Set 5	Set 6	Set 7
3 August	16:35	Kevin Farley (BAR)	4–3	Chetan Nathoo (RSA)	6–11	8–11	12–10	6–11	11–9	12–10	11–9
3 August	18:55	Chetan Nathoo (RSA)	4–0	Stephen Reilly (FIJ)	11–4	11–8	11–3	11–6			
3 August	20:05	Kevin Farley (BAR)	4–0	Stephen Reilly (FIJ)	11–3	11–3	11–3	11–7			

=== Group 12 ===
Name	Pld	MW	ML	GW	GL	Pts
Paul McCreery (NIR)	2	2	0	8	2	4
Iosif Elia (CYP)	2	1	1	5	7	3
Godfrey Sultan (SEY)	2	0	2	4	8	2

Date	Time	Player 1	Score	Player 2	Set 1	Set 2	Set 3	Set 4	Set 5	Set 6	Set 7
3 August	16:35	Paul McCreery (NIR)	4–1	Godfrey Sultan (SEY)	10–12	11–4	12–10	11–5	11–6		
3 August	18:55	Paul McCreery (NIR)	4–1	Iosif Elia (CYP)	11–9	11–9	7–11	13–11	11–4		
3 August	20:40	Iosif Elia (CYP)	4–3	Godfrey Sultan (SEY)	11–13	11–4	7–11	11–7	11–4	7–11	11–8

=== Group 13 ===
Name	Pld	MW	ML	GW	GL	Pts
Javen Choong (MAS)	2	2	0	8	0	4
Emmanuel Asante (GHA)	2	1	2	4	5	3
Jai Chauhan (FIJ)	2	0	2	1	8	2

Date	Time	Player 1	Score	Player 2	Set 1	Set 2	Set 3	Set 4	Set 5	Set 6	Set 7
3 August	16:35	Javen Choong (MAS)	4–0	Emmanuel Asante (GHA)	11–5	11–6	11–5	11–4			
3 August	18:55	Javen Choong (MAS)	4–0	Jai Chauhan (FIJ)	12–6	11–2	11–1	11–4			
3 August	20:40	Emmanuel Asante (GHA)	4–0	Jai Chauhan (FIJ)	11–2	11–5	11–8	11–4			

=== Group 14 ===
Name	Pld	MW	ML	GW	GL	Pts
Colin Dalgleish (SCO)	3	3	0	12	0	6
Emmanuel Commey (GHA)	3	2	1	8	4	5
Vicky Wu (FIJ)	3	1	2	4	8	4
Gary Nuopula (SOL)	3	0	3	0	12	3

Date	Time	Player 1	Score	Player 2	Set 1	Set 2	Set 3	Set 4	Set 5	Set 6	Set 7
3 August	17:10	Colin Dalgleish (SCO)	4–0	Emmanuel Commey (GHA)	11–4	11–9	11–8	11–8			
3 August	17:10	Vicky Wu (FIJ)	4–0	Gary Nuopula (SOL)	11–7	11–9	11–7	11–6			
3 August	18:55	Emmanuel Commey (GHA)	4–0	Gary Nuopula (SOL)	11–5	11–4	11–4	11–6			
3 August	18:55	Colin Dalgleish (SCO)	4–0	Vicky Wu (FIJ)	11–6	11–7	11–1	11–3			
3 August	21:15	Emmanuel Commey (GHA)	4–0	Vicky Wu (FIJ)	11–4	11–5	11–4	11–2			
3 August	21:15	Colin Dalgleish (SCO)	4–0	Gary Nuopula (SOL)	11–4	11–2	11–5	11–4			

=== Group 15 ===
Name	Pld	MW	ML	GW	GL	Pts
Fahad Khawaja (PAK)	3	3	0	12	1	6
Christopher Franklin (GUY)	3	2	1	8	7	5
Mohutasin Ridoy (BAN)	3	1	2	6	10	4
Derron Douglas (TTO)	3	0	3	4	12	3

Date	Time	Player 1	Score	Player 2	Set 1	Set 2	Set 3	Set 4	Set 5	Set 6	Set 7
3 August	17:10	Fahad Khawaja (PAK)	4–0	Christopher Franklin (GUY)	11–5	11–9	11–7	11–6			
3 August	17:10	Mohutasin Ridoy (BAN)	4–2	Derron Douglas (TTO)	7–11	11–7	11–8	11–9	9–11	11–9	
3 August	18:55	Christopher Franklin (GUY)	4–2	Derron Douglas (TTO)	7–11	11–9	11–7	3–11	11–9	11–3	
3 August	18:55	Fahad Khawaja (PAK)	4–1	Mohutasin Ridoy (BAN)	9–11	11–5	11–2	17–15	11–5		
3 August	21:15	Christopher Franklin (GUY)	4–1	Mohutasin Ridoy (BAN)	11–9	11–9	8–11	11–8	12–10		
3 August	21:15	Fahad Khawaja (PAK)	4–0	Derron Douglas (TTO)	11–8	13–11	14–12	11–9			
