= Philippine National Badminton Open =

Badminton tournament in the Philippines

The Philippine National Badminton Open is the domestic open badminton tournament of the Philippines organized by the Philippine Badminton Association (PBAD).

The PBA has sanctioned two "National Opens" in the 2010s, the Bingo Bonanza National Open and the Smart National Badminton Open. Bingo Bonanza was last held in 2016 while Smart was last conducted in 2019 after which no tournament was held due to the COVID-19 pandemic.

The Philippine National Badminton Open was revived in 2023 under a non-corporate title.

== Background ==
The Philippine Badminton Association (PBAD) is the national sports association or governing body for badminton in the Philippines.

A similarly named tournament, known as the Yonex-Sunrise Philippine National Badminton Open was held from 2004 to 2011. The PBAD has issued a statement that it never sanctioned this tournament.

The PBAD, however has sanctioned the conduct of various tournaments as the "National Open". This includes the Bingo Bonanza National Open of AB Leisure Exponent Inc. and the Smart National Open Badminton Tournament of Smart Communications both of which were started in 2014. The last Bingo Bonanza Open was held in 2016.

Meanwhile the Smart Open was held until 2019.

The COVID-19 pandemic stopped the conduct of the Smart Open. After three years tournament was revived as the Philippine Badminton Open (PBO). Smart remains among the tournament's various corporate sponsors. The tournament has been held annually since 2023.

== Winners ==
=== Bingo Bonanza National Open ===
Year	Men's singles	Women's singles	Mixed doubles	Ref.
2014	Mark Alcala	Gelita Castilo	Paul Vivas; Christine Inlayo	
2015	Mark Alcala	Sarah Barredo	Ronel Estanislao; Marissa Vita (INA)	
2016	Ros Pedrosa	Bianca Carlos	Peter Magnaye; Devi Permatasari (INA)	

=== Smart National Open ===
Year	Men's singles	Women's singles	Men's doubles	Women's doubles	Mixed doubles	Ref.
2014	Mark Alcala	Wang Lili (CHN)	Peter Magnaye; Paul Vivas	Malvinne Alcala; Gelita Castilo	Ronel Estanislao; Joella Geva de Vera	
2015	Mark Alcala	Jessica Muljati (INA)	Philip Joper Escueta; Ronel Estanislao	Wang Lili (CHN); Aires Montilla	Peter Magnaye; Jessie Francisco	
2016	Shazwan Shahrul (MAS)	Bianca Carlos	Anton Cayanan; Joper Escueta	Alyssa Leonardo; Thea Pomar	John Pantig; Francesca Bermejo	
2017	No information					
2018	Ros Pedrosa	Sarah Barredo	Ariel Magnaye; Alvin Morada	Alyssa Leonardo; Thea Pomar	Alvin Morada; Alyssa Leonardo	
2019	Ros Pedrosa	Bianca Carlos	Ariel Magnaye; Alvin Morada	Thea Pomar; Alyssa Leonardo	Thea Pomar; Ariel Magnaye	

=== Philippine National Open (2023–present) ===
Year	Men's singles	Women's singles	Men's doubles	Women's doubles	Mixed doubles	Ref.
2023	Marc Velasco	Mika De Guzman	Solomon Padiz Jr. Julius Villabrille	Nicole Albo; Lea Inlayo	Julius Villabrille; Nicole Albo	
2024	Jelo Albo	Mika De Guzman	Ariel Magnaye; Christian Bernardo	Nicole Albo; Lea Inlayo	Christian Bernardo; Alyssa Leonardo	
2025	Jelo Albo	Mika De Guzman	Solomon Padiz Jr. Julius Villabrille	Nicole Albo; Lea Inlayo	Julius Villabrille; Nicole Albo	
