= Margret Tembo =

Zambian boxer

Margret Tembo (born 21 May 1999 ) is a Zambian boxer. Tembo represented Zambia at the 2024 Summer Olympics in Paris where she was defeated in the first round of the women's 50kg boxing event to Finland's Pihla Kaivo-oja. Tembo was the first female boxer to represent Zambia at the Olympics.
