= Badminton at the 2022 Commonwealth Games – Mixed doubles =

Badminton – Mixed doubles at the 2022 Commonwealth Games
- Venue: National Exhibition Centre, Solihull
- Dates: 3–8 August

Medalists
gold medal	Terry Hee; Tan Wei Han	Singapore
silver medal	Marcus Ellis; Lauren Smith	England
bronze medal	Tan Kian Meng; Lai Pei Jing	Malaysia

The mixed doubles badminton event at the 2022 Commonwealth Games was held from 3 to 8 August 2022 at the National Exhibition Centre on the Solihull, England. The defending gold medalists were Chris Adcock and Gabby Adcock of England. The Adcocks did not defend their title, due to their retirement.

The athletes were drawn into straight knockout stage. The draw for the competition was conducted on 28 July 2022.

== Seeds ==
The seeds for the tournament were:

1. Tan Kian Meng / Lai Pei Jing (MAS) (Semi-finals, Bronze medalists)
2. Marcus Ellis / Lauren Smith (ENG) (final, Silver medalists)
3. Terry Hee / Tan Wei Han (SGP) (champions, Gold medalists)
4. Adam Hall / Julie MacPherson (SCO) (Semi-finals, fourth place)

5. Chan Peng Soon / Cheah Yee See (MAS) (quarter-finals)
6. Callum Hemming / Jessica Pugh (ENG) (quarter-finals)
7. Sachin Dias / Thilini Hendahewa (SRI) (quarter-finals)
8. Oliver Leydon-Davis / Anona Pak (NZL) (quarter-finals)

Click on the seed number of a player to go to their draw section.

== Results ==
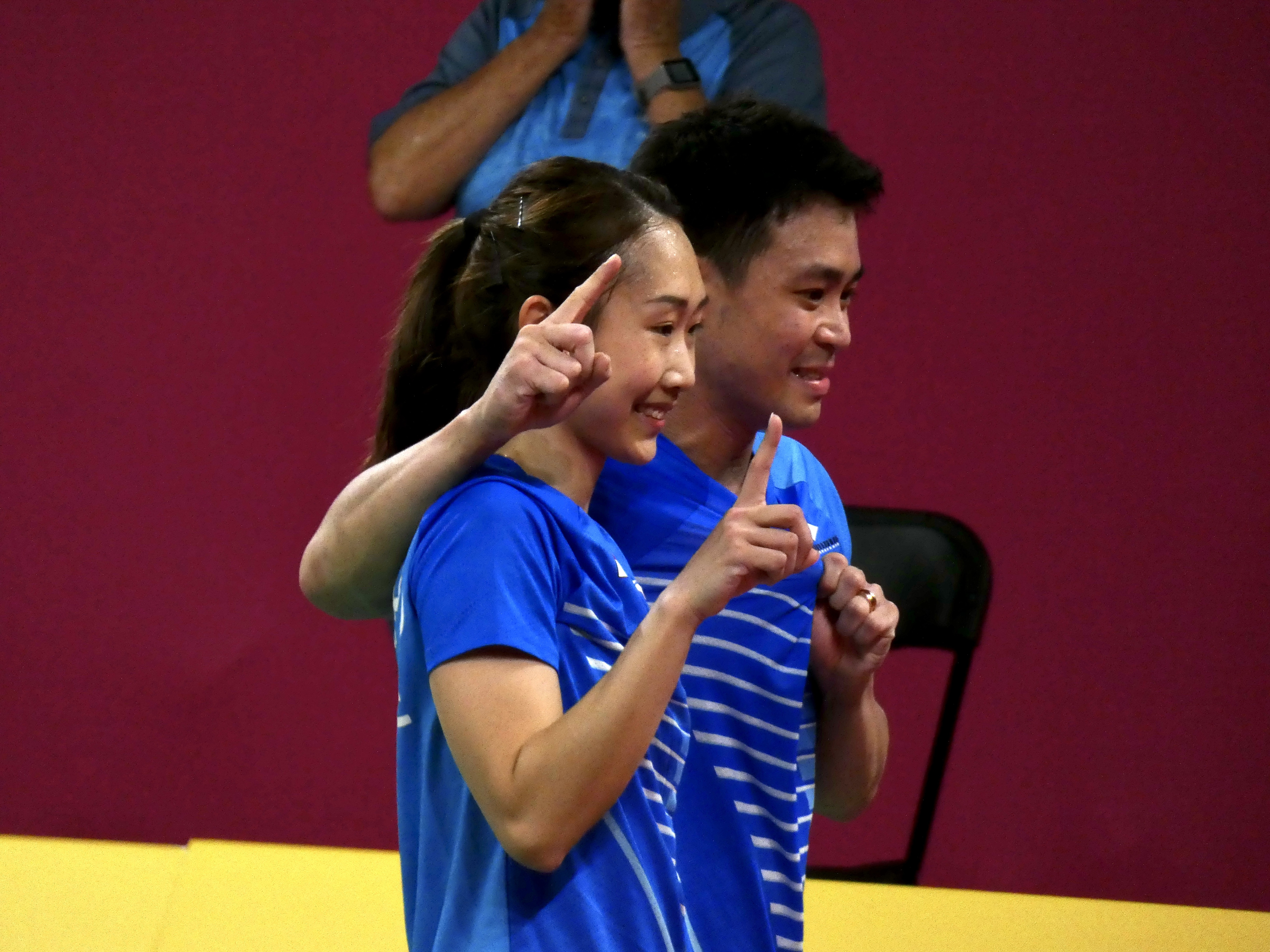
Terry Hee and Tan Wei Han of Singapore, gold medallists in the mixed doubles badminton at the 2022 Commonwealth Games, Birmingham

=== Finals ===
Semi-finals
1	Tan Kian Meng (MAS); Lai Pei Jing (MAS)	23	18
3	Terry Hee (SGP); Tan Wei Han (SGP)	25	21
4	Adam Hall (SCO); Julie MacPherson (SCO)	14	7
2	Marcus Ellis (ENG); Lauren Smith (ENG)	21	21

Gold medal match
3	Terry Hee (SGP); Tan Wei Han (SGP)	21	21
2	Marcus Ellis (ENG); Lauren Smith (ENG)	16	15
Bronze medal match
1	Tan Kian Meng (MAS); Lai Pei Jing (MAS)	21	21
4	Adam Hall (SCO); Julie MacPherson (SCO)	15	17

=== Top half ===
==== Section 1 ====
First Round
Yingxiang Lin (AUS); Gronya Somerville (AUS)	21	21
Doug Clark (FLK); Cheryl March (FLK)	4	3
Kennie Marteen King (BAR); Tamisha Williams (BAR)	12	19
Joel Angus (JAM); Katherine Wynter (JAM)	21	21

Second Round
1	Tan Kian Meng (MAS); Lai Pei Jing (MAS)	21	21
Tejraj Pultoo (MRI); Ganesha Mungrah (MRI)	5	8
Brian Kasirye (UGA); Fadilah Mohamed Rafi (UGA)	10	6
Yingxiang Lin (AUS); Gronya Somerville (AUS)	21	21
6	Callum Hemming (ENG); Jessica Pugh (ENG)	21	21
B. Sumeeth Reddy (IND); Ashwini Ponnappa (IND)	18	16
Stuart Hardy (GGY); Chloe Le Tissier (GGY)	17	11
Joel Angus (JAM); Katherine Wynter (JAM)	21	21

Third Round
1	Tan Kian Meng (MAS); Lai Pei Jing (MAS)	21	21
Yingxiang Lin (AUS); Gronya Somerville (AUS)	10	11
6	Callum Hemming (ENG); Jessica Pugh (ENG)	21	21
Joel Angus (JAM); Katherine Wynter (JAM)	11	7

Quarter-finals
1	Tan Kian Meng (MAS); Lai Pei Jing (MAS)	22	21
6	Callum Hemming (ENG); Jessica Pugh (ENG)	20	11

==== Section 2 ====
First Round
Christopher Grimley (SCO); Eleanor O'Donnell (SCO)	21	21
Zayan Zaki (MDV); Fathimath Nabaaha Abdul Razzaq (MDV)	8	9
Aaron Tamakloe (GHA); Cindy Tornyenyor (GHA)	5	17
Alexandre Bongout (MRI); Jemimah Leung (MRI)	21	21
Tran Hoang Pham (AUS); Angela Yu (AUS)	21	21
Dwight Joshua (FLK); Soraye March (FLK)	2	5

Second Round
3	Terry Hee (SGP); Tan Wei Han (SGP)	21	21
Kalombo Mulenga (ZAM); Ogar Siamupangila (ZAM)	6	4
Jarred Elliott (RSA); Deidre Laurens Jordaan (RSA)	8	10
Christopher Grimley (SCO); Eleanor O'Donnell (SCO)	21	21
8	Oliver Leydon-Davis (NZL); Anona Pak (NZL)	21	21
Alexandre Bongout (MRI); Jemimah Leung (MRI)	7	10
Kenneth Mwambu (UGA); Justine Naluwooza (UGA)	6	7
Tran Hoang Pham (AUS); Angela Yu (AUS)	21	21

Third Round
3	Terry Hee (SGP); Tan Wei Han (SGP)	21	21
Christopher Grimley (SCO); Eleanor O'Donnell (SCO)	15	11
8	Oliver Leydon-Davis (NZL); Anona Pak (NZL)	21	21
Tran Hoang Pham (AUS); Angela Yu (AUS)	12	15

Quarter-finals
3	Terry Hee (SGP); Tan Wei Han (SGP)	21	21
8	Oliver Leydon-Davis (NZL); Anona Pak (NZL)	11	11

=== Bottom half ===
==== Section 3 ====
First Round
Duane March (FLK); Laura Harada (FLK)	3	4
Samuel Ricketts (JAM); Tahlia Richardson (JAM)	21	21
Andy Kwek (SGP); Jin Yujia (SGP)	21	21
Ajfan Rasheed (MDV); Aminath Nabeeha Abdul Razzaq (MDV)	3	12
Kelvin Alphous (GHA); Prospera Nantuo (GHA)	21	21
Chongo Mulenga (ZAM); Elizaberth Chipeleme (ZAM)	19	16

Second Round
Samuel Ricketts (JAM); Tahlia Richardson (JAM)	13	21	8
Jack Yu (AUS); Kaitlyn Ea (AUS)	21	16	21
Andy Kwek (SGP); Jin Yujia (SGP)	8	13
5	Chan Peng Soon (MAS); Cheah Yee See (MAS)	21	21
Kelvin Alphous (GHA); Prospera Nantuo (GHA)	17	21	14
Friday Attama (UGA); Sharifah Wanyana (UGA)	21	17	21
Julien Paul (MRI); Kobita Dookhee (MRI)	7	8
4	Adam Hall (SCO); Julie MacPherson (SCO)	21	21

Third Round
Jack Yu (AUS); Kaitlyn Ea (AUS)	16	12
5	Chan Peng Soon (MAS); Cheah Yee See (MAS)	21	21
Friday Attama (UGA); Sharifah Wanyana (UGA)	5	6
4	Adam Hall (SCO); Julie MacPherson (SCO)	21	21

Quarter-finals
5	Chan Peng Soon (MAS); Cheah Yee See (MAS)	15	19
4	Adam Hall (SCO); Julie MacPherson (SCO)	21	21

==== Section 4 ====
First Round
Sammy Mdogo Sikoyo (KEN); Saumya Gupta (KEN)	4	10
Aatish Lubah (MRI); Lorna Bodha (MRI)	21	21
Daniel Wanagaliya (UGA); Husina Kobugabe (UGA)	21	21
Narayan Ramdhani (GUY); Priyanna Ramdhani (GUY)	18	10

Second Round
Aatish Lubah (MRI); Lorna Bodha (MRI)	8	14
Robert Summers (RSA); Johanita Scholtz (RSA)	21	21
Ty Alexander Lindeman (CAN); Josephine Wu (CAN)	11	18
7	Sachin Dias (SRI); Thilini Hendahewa (SRI)	21	21
Daniel Wanagaliya (UGA); Husina Kobugabe (UGA)	21	21
Ben Chater (FLK); Vicky Chater (FLK)	13	7
Shae Martin (BAR); Sabrina Scott (BAR)	8	8
2	Marcus Ellis (ENG); Lauren Smith (ENG)	21	21

Third Round
Robert Summers (RSA); Johanita Scholtz (RSA)	18	8
7	Sachin Dias (SRI); Thilini Hendahewa (SRI)	21	21
Daniel Wanagaliya (UGA); Husina Kobugabe (UGA)	5	7
2	Marcus Ellis (ENG); Lauren Smith (ENG)	21	21

Quarter-finals
7	Sachin Dias (SRI); Thilini Hendahewa (SRI)	12	19
2	Marcus Ellis (ENG); Lauren Smith (ENG)	21	21
