= Badminton at the 2022 Commonwealth Games – Men's doubles =

Badminton – Men's doubles at the 2022 Commonwealth Games
- Venue: National Exhibition Centre, Solihull
- Dates: 4–8 August
- Competitors: 26 from 20 nations

Medalists
gold medal	Satwiksairaj Rankireddy; Chirag Shetty	India
silver medal	Ben Lane; Sean Vendy	England
bronze medal	Aaron Chia; Soh Wooi Yik	Malaysia

The men's doubles badminton event at the 2022 Commonwealth Games was held from 4 to 8 August 2022 at the National Exhibition Centre on the Solihull, England. The defending gold medalists were Marcus Ellis and Chris Langridge of England. Ellis and Langridge did not defend their title.

The athletes were drawn into straight knockout stage. The draw for the competition was conducted on 28 July 2022.

== Seeds ==
The seeds for the tournament were:

1. Aaron Chia / Soh Wooi Yik (MAS) (semi-finals, Bronze medalists)
2. Satwiksairaj Rankireddy / Chirag Shetty (IND) (champions, Gold medalists)

3. Ben Lane / Sean Vendy (ENG) (final, Silver medalists)
4. Alexander Dunn / Adam Hall (SCO) (second round)

Click on the seed number of a player to go to their draw section.

== Results ==
=== Finals ===
Semi-finals
1	Aaron Chia (MAS); Soh Wooi Yik (MAS)	21	17	4
3	Ben Lane (ENG); Sean Vendy (ENG)	18	21	21
Chan Peng Soon (MAS); Tan Kian Meng (MAS)	6	15
2	Satwiksairaj Rankireddy (IND); Chirag Shetty (IND)	21	21

Gold medal match
3	Ben Lane (ENG); Sean Vendy (ENG)	15	13
2	Satwiksairaj Rankireddy (IND); Chirag Shetty (IND)	21	21
Bronze medal match
1	Aaron Chia (MAS); Soh Wooi Yik (MAS)	21	11	21
Chan Peng Soon (MAS); Tan Kian Meng (MAS)	19	21	11

=== Top half ===
==== Section 1 ====
Round of 32
Rishwan Shiyam (MDV); Zayan Zaki (MDV)	5	7
Christopher Grimley (SCO); Matthew Grimley (SCO)	21	21
Chongo Mulenga (ZAM); Kalombo Mulenga (ZAM)	21	21
Ahmad Abdul-Samad (GHA); Kelvin Alphous (GHA)	8	7

Round of 16
1	Aaron Chia (MAS); Soh Wooi Yik (MAS)	21	21
Christopher Grimley (SCO); Matthew Grimley (SCO)	19	16
Brian Kasirye (UGA); Daniel Wanagaliya (UGA)	21	21
Chongo Mulenga (ZAM); Kalombo Mulenga (ZAM)	15	15

Quarter-finals
1	Aaron Chia (MAS); Soh Wooi Yik (MAS)	21	21
Brian Kasirye (UGA); Daniel Wanagaliya (UGA)	6	12

==== Section 2 ====
Round of 32
Adam Dong (CAN); Nyl Yakura (CAN)	w	/	o
Terry Hee (SGP); Loh Kean Hean (SGP)
Tran Hoang Pham (AUS); Jack Yu (AUS)	21	21
Doug Clark (FLK); Duane March (FLK)	5	7
Joel Angus (JAM); Samuel Ricketts (JAM)	21	21
Alexandre Bongout (MRI); Tejraj Pultoo (MRI)	19	15

Round of 16
3	Ben Lane (ENG); Sean Vendy (ENG)	21	21
Adam Dong (CAN); Nyl Yakura (CAN)	13	19
Tran Hoang Pham (AUS); Jack Yu (AUS)	21	21
Joel Angus (JAM); Samuel Ricketts (JAM)	11	9

Quarter-finals
3	Ben Lane (ENG); Sean Vendy (ENG)	21	21
Tran Hoang Pham (AUS); Jack Yu (AUS)	10	14

=== Bottom half ===
==== Section 3 ====
Round of 32
Sachin Dias (SRI); Buwaneka Goonethilleka (SRI)	21	21
Kennie Maarten King (BAR); Shae Martin (BAR)	12	9
Ahmed Nibal (MDV); Ajfan Rasheed (MDV)	21	21
Ben Chater (FLK); Dwight Joshua (FLK)	14	11
Chan Peng Soon (MAS); Tan Kian Meng (MAS)	21	21
Aatish Lubah (MRI); Julien Paul (MRI)	12	11

Round of 16
Sachin Dias (SRI); Buwaneka Goonethilleka (SRI)	21	21
Ahmed Nibal (MDV); Ajfan Rasheed (MDV)	12	8
Chan Peng Soon (MAS); Tan Kian Meng (MAS)	18	25	21
4	Alexander Dunn (SCO); Adam Hall (SCO)	21	23	15

Quarter-finals
Sachin Dias (SRI); Buwaneka Goonethilleka (SRI)	16	12
Chan Peng Soon (MAS); Tan Kian Meng (MAS)	21	21

==== Section 4 ====
Round of 32
Matthew Abela (MLT); Samuel Cassar (MLT)	21	21
Friday Attama (UGA); Kenneth Mwambu (UGA)	10	18
Jarred Elliott (RSA); Robert Summers (RSA)	19	17
Murad Ali (PAK); Muhammad Irfan Saeed Bhatti (PAK)	21	21

Round of 16
Matthew Abela (MLT); Samuel Cassar (MLT)	15	9
Jacob Schueler (AUS); Nathan Tang (AUS)	21	21
Murad Ali (PAK); Muhammad Irfan Saeed Bhatti (PAK)	8	7
2	Satwiksairaj Rankireddy (IND); Chirag Shetty (IND)	21	21

Quarter-finals
Jacob Schueler (AUS); Nathan Tang (AUS)	9	11
2	Satwiksairaj Rankireddy (IND); Chirag Shetty (IND)	21	21
