= Badminton at the 2022 Commonwealth Games – Women's doubles =

Badminton – Women's doubles at the 2022 Commonwealth Games
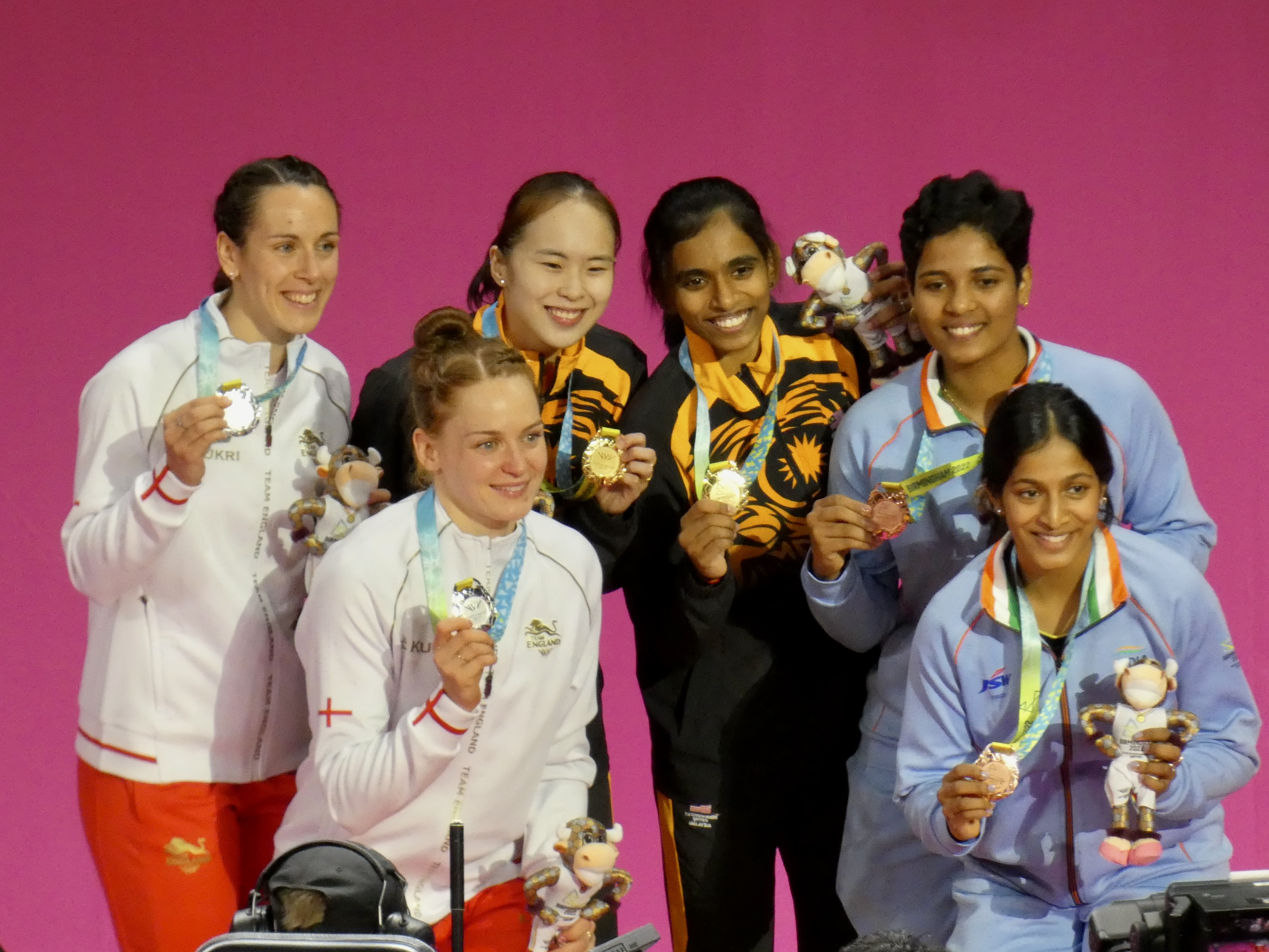
- The six medallists in the women's doubles at the 2022 Commonwealth Games in Birmingham
- Venue: National Exhibition Centre, Solihull
- Dates: 4–8 August

Medalists
gold medal	Pearly Tan; Thinaah Muralitharan	Malaysia
silver medal	Chloe Birch; Lauren Smith	England
bronze medal	Treesa Jolly; Gayathri Gopichand	India

The women's doubles badminton event at the 2022 Commonwealth Games was held from 4 to 8 August 2022 at the National Exhibition Centre on the Solihull, England. The defending gold medalists were Chow Mei Kuan and Vivian Hoo of Malaysia. Chow and Hoo did not defend their title.

The athletes were drawn into straight knockout stage. The draw for the competition was conducted on 28 July 2022.

== Seeds ==
The seeds for the tournament were:

1. Pearly Tan / Thinaah Muralitharan (MAS) (Champions, Gold medalists)
2. Chloe Birch / Lauren Smith (ENG) (final, silver medalists)
3. Rachel Honderich / Kristen Tsai (CAN) (quarter-finals)
4. Treesa Jolly / Gayathri Gopichand (IND) (semi-finals, bronze medalists)

Click on the seed number of a player to go to their draw section.

== Results ==
=== Finals ===
Semi-finals
1	Pearly Tan (MAS); Thinaah Muralitharan (MAS)	21	21
4	Treesa Jolly (IND); Gayathri Gopichand (IND)	13	16
Chen Hsuan-yu (AUS); Gronya Somerville (AUS)	14	22
2	Chloe Birch (ENG); Lauren Smith (ENG)	21	24

Gold medal match
1	Pearly Tan (MAS); Thinaah Muralitharan (MAS)	21	21
2	Chloe Birch (ENG); Lauren Smith (ENG)	5	8
Bronze medal match
4	Treesa Jolly (IND); Gayathri Gopichand (IND)	21	21
Chen Hsuan-yu (AUS); Gronya Somerville (AUS)	15	18

=== Top half ===
==== Section 1 ====
Round of 32
Deidre Laurens Jordaan (RSA); Johanita Scholtz (RSA)	21	21
Eleni Christodoulou (CYP); Eva Kattirtzi (CYP)	15	14
Aminath Nabeeha Abdul Razzaq (MDV); Fathimath Nabaaha Abdul Razzaq (MDV)	13	15
Kaitlyn Ea (AUS); Angela Yu (AUS)	21	21

Round of 16
1	Pearly Tan (MAS); Thinaah Muralitharan (MAS)	21	21
Deidre Laurens Jordaan (RSA); Johanita Scholtz (RSA)	6	4
Jin Yujia (SGP); Crystal Wong (SGP)	21	21
Kaitlyn Ea (AUS); Angela Yu (AUS)	12	13

Quarter-finals
1	Pearly Tan (MAS); Thinaah Muralitharan (MAS)	21	11	21
Jin Yujia (SGP); Crystal Wong (SGP)	15	21	15

==== Section 2 ====
Round of 32
Justine Naluwooza (UGA); Sharifah Wanyana (UGA)	21	18	15
Jemimah Leung (MRI); Ganesha Mungrah (MRI)	16	21	21
Prospera Nantuo (GHA); Cindy Tornyenyor (GHA)	21	22
Vicky Chater (FLK); Cheryl March (FLK)	17	20

Round of 16
4	Treesa Jolly (IND); Gayathri Gopichand (IND)	21	21
Jemimah Leung (MRI); Ganesha Mungrah (MRI)	2	4
Tahlia Richardson (JAM); Katherine Wynter (JAM)	21	21
Prospera Nantuo (GHA); Cindy Tornyenyor (GHA)	5	6

Quarter-finals
4	Treesa Jolly (IND); Gayathri Gopichand (IND)	21	21
Tahlia Richardson (JAM); Katherine Wynter (JAM)	8	6

=== Bottom half ===
==== Section 3 ====
Round of 32
Mahoor Shahzad (PAK); Ghazala Siddique (PAK)	10	13
Chen Hsuan-yu (AUS); Gronya Somerville (AUS)	21	21
Julie MacPherson (SCO); Ciara Torrance (SCO)	21	21
Laura Harada (FLK); Louise Williams (FLK)	4	5

Round of 16
Chen Hsuan-yu (AUS); Gronya Somerville (AUS)	21	21
Elena Johnson (GGY); Chloe Le Tissier (GGY)	9	7
Julie MacPherson (SCO); Ciara Torrance (SCO)	12	15
3	Rachel Honderich (CAN); Kristen Tsai (CAN)	21	21

Quarter-finals
Chen Hsuan-yu (AUS); Gronya Somerville (AUS)	18	21	21
3	Rachel Honderich (CAN); Kristen Tsai (CAN)	21	15	16

==== Section 4 ====
Round of 32
Lorna Bodha (MRI); Kobita Dookhee (MRI)	21	21
Elizaberth Chipeleme (ZAM); Ogar Siamupangila (ZAM)	9	7
Cheah Yee See (MAS); Lai Pei Jing (MAS)	21	21
Sabrina Scott (BAR); Tamisha Williams (BAR)	5	6

Round of 16
Lorna Bodha (MRI); Kobita Dookhee (MRI)	19	19
Husina Kobugabe (UGA); Fadilah Mohamed Rafi (UGA)	21	21
Cheah Yee See (MAS); Lai Pei Jing (MAS)	19	16
2	Chloe Birch (ENG); Lauren Smith (ENG)	21	21

Quarter-finals
Husina Kobugabe (UGA); Fadilah Mohamed Rafi (UGA)	6	4
2	Chloe Birch (ENG); Lauren Smith (ENG)	21	21
