= Badminton at the 2022 Commonwealth Games – Women's singles =

Badminton – Women's singles at the 2022 Commonwealth Games
- Venue: National Exhibition Centre, Solihull
- Dates: 3–8 August

Medalists
gold medal	P. V. Sindhu	India
silver medal	Michelle Li	Canada
bronze medal	Yeo Jia Min	Singapore

The women's singles badminton event at the 2022 Commonwealth Games was held from 3 to 8 August 2022 at the National Exhibition Centre on the Solihull, England. The defending gold medalist was Saina Nehwal of India. Nehwal did not defend her title.

The athletes were drawn into straight knockout stage. The draw for the competition was conducted on 28 July 2022.

== Seeds ==
The seeds for the tournament were:

1. P. V. Sindhu (IND) (champion, Gold medalist)
2. Michelle Li (CAN) (final, Silver medalist)
3. Kirsty Gilmour (SCO) (Semi-finals, fourth place)
4. Yeo Jia Min (SGP) (Semi-finals, Bronze medalist)

5. Aakarshi Kashyap (IND) (quarter-finals)
6. Goh Jin Wei (MAS) (quarter-finals)
7. Chen Hsuan-yu (AUS) (quarter-finals)
8. Rachael Darragh (NIR) (quarter-finals)

Click on the seed number of a player to go to their draw section.

== Results ==
=== Finals ===
Semi-finals
1	P. V. Sindhu (IND)	21	21
4	Yeo Jia Min (SGP)	19	17
3	Kirsty Gilmour (SCO)	23	21	18
2	Michelle Li (CAN)	21	23	21

Gold medal match
1	P. V. Sindhu (IND)	21	21
2	Michelle Li (CAN)	15	13
Bronze medal match
4	Yeo Jia Min (SGP)	21	22
3	Kirsty Gilmour (SCO)	14	20

=== Top half ===
==== Section 1 ====
First Round
Ogar Siamupangila (ZAM)	9	8
Husina Kobugabe (UGA)	21	21
Tamisha Williams (BAR)	21	21
Louise Williams (FLK)	8	10

Second Round
1	P. V. Sindhu (IND)	21	21
Fathimath Nabaaha Abdul Razzaq (MDV)	4	11
Saumya Gupta (KEN)	17	10
Husina Kobugabe (UGA)	21	21
6	Goh Jin Wei (MAS)	21	21
Cindy Tornyenyor (GHA)	3	1
Jemimah Leung (MRI)	17	21	19
Tamisha Williams (BAR)	21	10	21

Third Round
1	P. V. Sindhu (IND)	21	21
Husina Kobugabe (UGA)	10	9
6	Goh Jin Wei (MAS)	w	/	o
Tamisha Williams (BAR)

Quarter-finals
1	P. V. Sindhu (IND)	19	21	21
6	Goh Jin Wei (MAS)	21	14	18

==== Section 2 ====
First Round
Freya Redfearn (ENG)	21	21
Johanita Scholtz (RSA)	11	12
Emily Trebert (GGY)	7	13
Lorna Bodha (MRI)	21	21
Vicky Chater (FLK)	4	3
Ghazala Siddique (PAK)	21	21

Second Round
4	Yeo Jia Min (SGP)	21	21
Eleni Christodoulou (CYP)	12	8
Suhasni Vidanage (SRI)	11	14
Freya Redfearn (ENG)	21	21
7	Chen Hsuan-yu (AUS)	21	21
Lorna Bodha (MRI)	3	6
Tahlia Richardson (JAM)	21	21
Ghazala Siddique (PAK)	15	14

Third Round
4	Yeo Jia Min (SGP)	21	21
Freya Redfearn (ENG)	2	11
7	Chen Hsuan-yu (AUS)	21	21
Tahlia Richardson (JAM)	11	11

Quarter-finals
4	Yeo Jia Min (SGP)	21	21
7	Chen Hsuan-yu (AUS)	15	15

=== Bottom half ===
==== Section 3 ====
First Round
Madeleine Akoumba Ze (CMR)	10	11
Eva Kattirtzi (CYP)	21	21
Priyanna Ramdhani (GUY)	10	8
Mahoor Shahzad (PAK)	21	21
Elizaberth Chipeleme (ZAM)	15	8
Jessica Li (IOM)	21	21

Second Round
Eva Kattirtzi (CYP)	21	21
Prospera Nantuo (GHA)	10	8
Mahoor Shahzad (PAK)	20	1r
5	Aakarshi Kashyap (IND)	22	8
Jessica Li (IOM)	21	21
Sabrina Scott (BAR)	10	15
Tiffany Ho (AUS)	6	14
3	Kirsty Gilmour (SCO)	21	21

Third Round
Eva Kattirtzi (CYP)	2	7
5	Aakarshi Kashyap (IND)	21	21
Jessica Li (IOM)	8	12
3	Kirsty Gilmour (SCO)	21	21

Quarter-finals
5	Aakarshi Kashyap (IND)	10	7
3	Kirsty Gilmour (SCO)	21	21

==== Section 4 ====
First Round
Justine Naluwooza (UGA)	19	10
Deidre Laurens Jordaan (RSA)	21	21
Insyirah Khan (SGP)	21	21
Katherine Wynter (JAM)	7	4

Second Round
Deidre Laurens Jordaan (RSA)	21	21
Soraye March (FLK)	12	1
Kobita Dookhee (MRI)	10	8
8	Rachael Darragh (NIR)	21	21
Insyirah Khan (SGP)	21	21
Aminath Nabeeha Abdul Razzaq (MDV)	10	12
Abigail Holden (ENG)
2	Michelle Li (CAN)	w	/	o

Third Round
Deidre Laurens Jordaan (RSA)	13	5
8	Rachael Darragh (NIR)	21	21
Insyirah Khan (SGP)	10	9
2	Michelle Li (CAN)	21	21

Quarter-finals
8	Rachael Darragh (NIR)	14	14
2	Michelle Li (CAN)	21	21
