= Cycling at the Commonwealth Games =

Cycling is one of the sports at the quadrennial Commonwealth Games competition. It has been a Commonwealth Games sport since the second edition of the event's precursor, the 1934 British Empire Games. It is an optional sport and may, or may not, be included in the sporting programme of each edition of the Games, but has appeared in every edition of the Games to date. Australia have been the most successful nation in the event by a significant margin, with England and New Zealand closely matched for second place. Australia have led the medal table 16 times, one of which was shared by Canada, including every edition of the Games since 1990. England have led the table four times, but not since 1974. New Zealand have topped the table once, in their home Games of 1990.

== Editions ==
Games	Year	Host city	Host country	Best nation
II	1934	London (Cycling held in Manchester)	England	Australia, Canada
III	1938	Sydney, New South Wales	Australia	Australia
IV	1950	Auckland	New Zealand	Australia
V	1954	Vancouver, British Columbia	Canada	England
VI	1958	Cardiff	Wales	England
VII	1962	Perth, Western Australia	Australia	Australia
VIII	1966	Kingston	Jamaica	England
IX	1970	Edinburgh	Scotland	Australia
X	1974	Christchurch	New Zealand	England
XI	1978	Edmonton, Alberta	Canada	Australia
XII	1982	Brisbane, Queensland	Australia	Australia
XIII	1986	Edinburgh	Scotland	Australia
XIV	1990	Auckland	New Zealand	New Zealand
XV	1994	Victoria, British Columbia	Canada	Australia
XVI	1998	Kuala Lumpur	Malaysia	Australia
XVII	2002	Manchester	England	Australia
XVIII	2006	Melbourne, Victoria	Australia	Australia
XIX	2010	Delhi	India	Australia
XX	2014	Glasgow	Scotland	Australia
XXI	2018	Gold Coast	Australia	Australia
XXII	2022	Birmingham & London	England	Australia
XXIII	2026	Glasgow	Scotland	Australia

== Events ==
=== Track cycling events ===
Event	34	38	50	54	58	62	66	70	74	78	82	86	90	94	98	02	06	10	14	18	22	26	Games
Current program
Men's 1 km time trial	X	X	X	X	X	X	X	X	X	X	X	X	X	X	X	X	X	X	X	X	X	X	22
Men's 4000 m individual pursuit			X	X	X	X	X	X	X	X	X	X	X	X	X	X	X	X	X	X	X	X	20
Men's 4000 m team pursuit									X	X	X	X	X	X	X	X	X	X	X	X	X	X	14
Men's keirin																	X	X	X	X	X	X	6
Men's points race													X	X	X	X	X	X	X	X	X	X	10
Men's scratch race	X	X	X	X	X	X	X	X	X	X	X	X	X	X	X	X	X	X	X	X	X	X	22
Men's elimination race																						X	1
Men's sprint	X	X	X	X	X	X	X	X	X	X	X	X	X	X	X	X	X	X	X	X	X	X	22
Men's team sprint																X	X	X	X	X	X	X	7
Women's 500 m time trial																X	X	X	X	X	X		6
Women's 1 km time trial																						X	1
Women's 3000 m individual pursuit													X	X	X	X	X	X	X	X	X		9
Women's 4000 m individual pursuit																						X	1
Women's team pursuit																				X	X	X	3
Women's keirin																				X	X	X	3
Women's points race														X	X	X	X	X	X	X	X	X	9
Women's scratch race																		X	X	X	X	X	5
Women's elimination race																						X	1
Women's sprint													X	X	X	X	X	X	X	X	X	X	10
Women's team sprint																		X		X	X	X	4
Past events
Men's tandem								X	X	X													3
Events	3	3	4	4	4	4	4	5	6	6	5	5	8	9	9	11	12	14	13	16	16	18	

=== Road cycling events ===
Event	38	50	54	58	62	66	70	74	78	82	86	90	94	98	02	06	10	14	18	22	26	Games
Current program
Men's individual time trial														X	X	X	X	X	X	X		7
Men's road race	X	X	X	X	X	X	X	X	X	X	X	X	X	X	X	X	X	X	X	X		20
Women's individual time trial														X	X	X	X	X	X	X		7
Women's road race												X	X	X	X	X	X	X	X	X		9
Past events
Men's team time trial										X	X	X	X									4
Women's team time trial													X									1
Events	1	1	1	1	1	1	1	1	1	2	2	3	4	4	4	4	4	4	4	4	0	

=== Mountain biking events ===
Event	02	06	14	18	22	26	Games
Current program
Men's cross-country	X	X	X	X	X		5
Women's cross-country	X	X	X	X	X		5
Events	2	2	2	2	2	0	

=== Para-track ===
Event	14	18	22	26	Games
Current program
Men's tandem sprint B	X	X	X	X	4
Men's tandem 1 km time trial B	X	X	X	X	4
Men's 1 km time trial C				X	1
Men's individual pursuit C				X	1
Women's tandem sprint B	X	X	X	X	4
Women's tandem 1 km time trial B	X	X	X	X	4
Women's 1 km time trial C				X	1
Women's individual pursuit C				X	1
Events	4	4	4	8	

== All-time medal table ==
Updated after the 2026 Commonwealth Games

Rank	Nation	Gold	Silver	Bronze	Total
1	Australia	131	83	65	279
2	England	39	57	49	145
3	New Zealand	38	55	49	142
4	Canada	15	19	27	61
5	Scotland	12	17	18	47
6	Wales	11	11	18	40
7	Trinidad and Tobago	3	3	5	11
8	Isle of Man	3	1	2	6
9	South Africa	2	3	11	16
10	Malaysia	2	2	3	7
11	Northern Ireland	0	1	3	4
12	Jamaica	0	1	1	2
13	Barbados	0	0	1	1
13	Namibia	0	0	1	1
Totals (14 entries)		256	253	253	762

== Para-track Cycling All-time medal table ==
Updated after the 2026 Commonwealth Games

Rank	Nation	Gold	Silver	Bronze	Total
1	Scotland	7	5	2	14
2	England	5	3	1	9
3	Australia	4	5	10	19
4	New Zealand	3	0	2	5
5	Wales	1	5	1	7
Totals (5 entries)		20	18	16	54

== Mountain Bike All-time medal table ==
Updated after the 2022 Commonwealth Games

Rank	Nation	Gold	Silver	Bronze	Total
1	Canada	4	2	3	9
2	New Zealand	3	5	0	8
3	England	3	2	1	6
4	Australia	0	1	3	4
5	South Africa	0	0	2	2
6	Namibia	0	0	1	1
Totals (6 entries)		10	10	10	30
