= Chronological summary of the 2022 Commonwealth Games =

Commonwealth Games events summary

The 2022 Commonwealth Games (officially the XXII Commonwealth Games) were held in Birmingham, England, from 28 July to 8 August 2022.

This page contains a chronological summary of major events from the Games.

== Calendar ==
The schedule was as follows:

All times and dates use British Summer Time (UTC+1)

OC	Opening ceremony	●	Event competitions	1	Gold medal events	CC	Closing ceremony

July/August 2022		July				August								Events
July/August 2022		28th Thu	29th Fri	30th Sat	31st Sun	1st Mon	2nd Tue	3rd Wed	4th Thu	5th Fri	6th Sat	7th Sun	8th Mon	Events
Ceremonies		OC											CC	—
Aquatics	Diving								2	3	3	2	2	12
Aquatics	Swimming		7	10	8	8	10	9						52
Athletics				4			6	8	6	5	14	15		58
Badminton			●	●	●	●	1	●	●	●	●	●	5	6
3x3 basketball			●	●	●	●	4							4
Beach volleyball				●	●	●	●	●	●	●	●	2		2
Boxing			●	●	●	●	●	●	●		●	16		16
Cricket			●	●	●		●	●	●		●	1		1
Cycling
Cycling	Mountain biking							2						26
Cycling	Road cycling								2			2		26
Cycling	Track cycling		6	4	6	4								26
Gymnastics	Artistic		1	1	2	5	5							20
Gymnastics	Rhythmic								1	1	4			20
Hockey			●	●	●	●	●	●	●	●	●	1	1	2
Judo						5	4	5						14
Lawn bowls			●	●	●	2	3	1	●	2	3			11
Netball			●	●	●	●	●	●	●	●	●	1		1
Para powerlifting									4					4
Rugby sevens			●	●	2									2
Squash			●	●	●	●	●	2	●	●	●	1	2	5
Table tennis			●	●	●	1	1	●	●	●	3	4	2	11
Triathlon			2		3									5
Weightlifting				4	3	3	3	3						16
Wrestling										6	6			12
Daily medal events			16	23	24	28	37	30	15	17	33	45	12	280
Cumulative total			16	39	63	91	128	158	173	190	223	268	280	280
July/August 2022		28th Thu	29th Fri	30th Sat	31st Sun	1st Mon	2nd Tue	3rd Wed	4th Thu	5th Fri	6th Sat	7th Sun	8th Mon	Total events
July/August 2022		July				August								Total events

== Day 0 – Thursday 28 July ==
Opening ceremony

- The opening ceremony at Alexander Stadium, including the Parade of Nations, officially opened the Games.

== Day 1 – Friday 29 July ==
=== Detailed results (day 1) ===
3x3 basketball

- The first day of matches in the group stage of the men's, women's, men's wheelchair and women's wheelchair tournaments.

Aquatics – Swimming

- Lara van Niekerk (South Africa) set a new Commonwealth Games record time of 29.82 in the women's 50m breaststroke heats, before beating her own record by 0.02 seconds in the semi-finals to set another Commonwealth Games record.
- Australia completed a podium sweep in the men's 400 m freestyle. Elijah Winnington finish first in 3:43.06 to win the gold medal. Samuel Short finished in 3:45.07 to take home the silver medal, with Mack Horton in third with a time of 3:46.49.
- In the women's 400m individual medley, Canada's Summer McIntosh recorded a time of 4:29.01 to set a new Commonwealth Games record. Australia's Kiah Melverton finished second with a time of 4:36.78, with Katie Shanahan (Scotland) finishing in 4:39.37 to take the bronze medal.
- Australia completed their second podium sweep of the day in the women's 200m freestyle. Ariarne Titmus finished in a Commonwealth Games record time of 1:53.89. Mollie O'Callaghan finished 0.12 seconds behind to take the silver medal, while Madison Wilson finished third in 1:56.17.
- Australia's Timothy Hodge set a new Commonwealth Games record time in the final of the men's 100m backstroke S9, finishing in 1:01.88. Jesse Reynolds (New Zealand) finished second in 1:03.65, with Barry McClements (Northern Ireland) finishing third with a time of 1:05.09.
- In the women's 100m freestyle S9, New Zealand's Sophie Pascoe finished in a time of 1:02.95 to win the gold medal. Australia's Emily Beecroft finished second with a time of 1:03.74, just 0.01 seconds ahead of Toni Shaw (Scotland) in third.
- In the men's 200m breaststroke, Australia's Zac Stubblety-Cook finished with a time of 2:08.07 to win the gold medal. England's James Wilby finished second with a time of 2:08.59. The bronze medal was won by Ross Murdoch with a time of 2:10.41.
- In the mixed 4 x 100m freestyle relay, Australia won gold with a time of 3:21.18. England finished second with a time of 3:22.45 and Canada took the bronze medals in 3:24.86.

Artistic Gymnastics

- England won the men's team all-around, scoring the best in each of the individual apparatus for a total combined score of 254.550. Canada finished second with 241.200 points, while Cyprus won the bronze medal with a score of 239.650. The final also determined the qualification standings for the individual all-around and apparatus finals (being held later in the week).

Badminton

- The first day of matches in the group stage of the mixed team tournament.

Boxing

- The first day of the men's and women's preliminary round of 32.

Cricket

- The first day of matches in the group stage.

Cycling – Track

- The New Zealand team of Rebecca Petch, Olivia King and Ellesse Andrews set a new Commonwealth Games record time of 47.841 in the women's team sprint qualifying round, before beating it again to win the gold medals in the final with a time of 47.425. They beat Canada's Sarah Orban, Kelsey Mitchell and Lauriane Genest, who finished in 48.001 to win the silver medals. The Welsh team of Lowri Thomas, Rhian Edmunds and Emma Finucane finished with a time of 47.767 to beat Australia in the bronze medal race.
- The Australian team of Leigh Hoffman, Matthew Richardson and Matthew Glaetzer set a new Commonwealth Games record time of 42.222 in the men's team sprint qualifying round, before beating it again to win the gold medals in the final with a time of 42.040. They beat England's Ryan Owens, Hamish Turnbull and Joe Truman, who finished in 43.372 to win the silver medals. The New Zealand team of Bradly Knipe, Sam Dakin and Sam Webster finished with a time of 43.856 to win the bronze medal race against Canada.
- The Australian team of Georgia Baker, Sophie Edwards, Chloe Moran and Maeve Plouffe set a new Commonwealth Games record time of 4:12.234 to win the gold medals in the women's 4000m team pursuit final. New Zealand's Ellesse Andrews, Bryony Botha, Michaela Drummond and Emily Shearman finished in 4:17.984 to win silver. In the bronze medal final, England's Laura Kenny, Josie Knight, Maddie Leech and Sophie Lewis finished in 4:17.096 to finish third, beating the team from Wales.
- The New Zealand team of Aaron Gate, Jordan Kerby, Tom Sexton and Campbell Stewart set a new Commonwealth Games time of 3:47.575 in the men's 4000m team pursuit, beating England's Dan Bigham, Charlie Tanfield, Ethan Vernon and Oli Wood in the gold medal race. Australia's team of Joshua Duffy, Graeme Frislie, Conor Leahy, Lucas Plapp and reserve James Moriarty won the bronze medal race against Wales, with a time of 3:50.403.

Cycling – Para-track

- Australia's Jesica Gallagher beat Scotland's Aileen McGlynn within two races in the women's tandem sprint B final. In the bronze medal final, England's Sophie Unwin won both races against Scotland's Libby Clegg.
- Neil Fachie (Scotland) set a new Commonwealth Games record time of 59.938 in the men's tandem B 1000m time trial final. James Ball (Wales) finished second in a time of 1:00.053, with Stephen Bate (England) winning the bronze medal in a time of 1:02.276.

Hockey

- The first day of matches in the group stage of the men's and women's tournaments.

Lawn bowls

- The first day of matches in the group stage of the men's pairs, men's triples, women's singles, women's fours, men's pairs B6–8 and women's pairs B6–8.

Netball

- The first day of matches in the group stage.

Rugby sevens

- The first day of matches in the group stage of the men's and women's tournaments.

Squash

- The men's singles and women's singles preliminary round of 64.

Table tennis

- The first day of group matches in the men's team and women's team tournaments.

Triathlon

- England's Alex Yee won the first medal of the Games, finishing with a winning time of 50:34 in the men's race. Hayden Wilde (New Zealand) secured the silver medal with a time of 50:47, despite picking up one 10 second penalty. Australia's Matthew Hauser took the bronze medal in a time of 50:50.
- The women's race was won by Bermuda's Flora Duffy, who finished with a time of 55:25. England's Georgia Taylor-Brown won the silver medal with a time of 56:06, with Beth Potter (Scotland) finishing third in 56:46.

=== Summary table (day 1) ===
Sport	Event	Gold medalist(s)			Silver medalist(s)		Bronze medalist(s)		Ref
Sport	Event	Competitor(s)	CGA	Rec	Competitor(s)	CGA	Competitor(s)	CGA	Ref
Aquatics – Swimming	Men's 400m freestyle	Elijah Winnington	Australia		Samuel Short	Australia	Mack Horton	Australia	
Aquatics – Swimming	Women's 400m individual medley	Summer McIntosh	Canada	GR	Kiah Melverton	Australia	Katie Shanahan	Scotland	
Aquatics – Swimming	Women's 200m freestyle	Ariarne Titmus	Australia	GR	Mollie O'Callaghan	Australia	Madison Wilson	Australia	
Aquatics – Swimming	Men's 100m backstroke S9	Timothy Hodge	Australia	GR	Jesse Reynolds	New Zealand	Barry McClements	Northern Ireland	
Aquatics – Swimming	Women's 100m freestyle S9	Sophie Pascoe	New Zealand		Emily Beecroft	New Zealand	Toni Shaw	Scotland	
Aquatics – Swimming	Men's 200m breaststroke	Zac Stubblety-Cook	Australia		James Wilby	England	Ross Murdoch	Scotland	
Aquatics – Swimming	Mixed 4 x 100m freestyle relay	William Xu Yang; Kyle Chalmers; Mollie O'Callaghan; Emma McKeon	Australia		Lewis Burras; Tom Dean; Anna Hopkin; Freya Anderson	England	Javier Acevedo; Joshua Liendo Edwards; Rebecca Smith; Margaret MacNeil	Canada	
Gymnastics – Artistic	Men's team all-around	Joe Fraser; Jake Jarman; Courtney Tulloch; Giarnii Regini-Moran; James Hall	England		Felix Dolci; Mathys Jalbert; Chris Kaji; Jayson Rampersad; Kenji Tamane	Canada	Michalis Chari; Sokratis Pilakouris; Georgios Angonas; Ilias Georgiou; Marios Georgiou	Cyprus	
Cycling – Track	Women's tandem sprint B	Jessica Gallagher	Australia		Aileen McGlynn	Scotland	Sophie Unwin	England	
Cycling – Track	Men's tandem B 1000m time trial	Neil Fachie	Scotland		James Ball	Wales	Stephen Bate	England	
Cycling – Track	Women's 4000m team pursuit	Georgia Baker; Sophie Edwards; Chloe Moran; Maeve Plouffe	Australia	GR	Ellesse Andrews; Bryony Botha; Michaela Drummond; Emily Shearman	New Zealand	Laura Kenny; Josie Knight; Maddie Leech; Sophie Lewis	England	
Cycling – Track	Men's 4000m team pursuit	Aaron Gate; Jordan Kerby; Tom Sexton; Campbell Stewart	New Zealand	GR	Dan Bigham; Charlie Tanfield; Ethan Vernon; Oli Wood	England	Joshua Duffy; Graeme Frislie; Conor Leahy; Lucas Plapp; James Moriarty (reserve)	Australia	
Cycling – Track	Women's team sprint	Rebecca Petch; Olivia King; Ellesse Andrews	New Zealand	GR	Sarah Orban; Kelsey Mitchell; Lauriane Genest	Canada	Lowri Thomas; Rhian Edmunds; Emma Finucane	Wales	
Cycling – Track	Men's team sprint	Leigh Hoffman; Matthew Richardson; Matthew Glaetzer	Australia	GR	Ryan Owens; Hamish Turnbull; Joe Truman	England	Bradly Knipe; Sam Dakin; Sam Webster	New Zealand	
Triathlon	Men's	Alex Yee	England		Hayden Wilde	New Zealand	Matthew Hauser	Australia	
Triathlon	Women's	Flora Duffy	Bermuda		Georgia Taylor-Brown	England	Beth Potter	Scotland	
