= Cycling at the 2022 Commonwealth Games =

- (From left to right) Track, Mountain biking, Road time trials, Road racing
- Venue: Lee Valley VeloPark (track cycling); Cannock Chase Forest (mountain biking); West Park (road time trials); Myton Fields (road race)
- Dates: 29 July – 1 August 2022 (track cycling); 3 August 2022 (mountain biking); 4 August 2022 (road time trials); 7 August 2022 (road race)

Cycling at the 2022 Commonwealth Games was the 21st appearance of Cycling at the Commonwealth Games. The cycling competition at the 2022 Commonwealth Games was held between 29 July and 7 August 2022 at four different venues. There were 26 events altogether in cycling, making the sport third-highest in terms of number of medals available. There were 20 events in track cycling (including four for para-cycling), two in mountain biking, two in road time trials and two in road racing.

== Schedule ==
The competition schedule was as follows:

Qualifying / Heats / Repechage	¼	Quarter-finals	½	Semi-finals	F	Medal final(s)

Road cycling and mountain biking
Date Event	Wed 3	Thu 4	Fri 5	Sat 6	Sun 7
Road cycling
Men's road race					F
Men's time trial		F			
Women's road race					F
Women's time trial		F			
Mountain biking
Men's cross-country	F				
Women's cross-country	F				

Track and para-track cycling
Date Event	Fri 29			Sat 30					Sun 31				Mon 1		
Session →	M		A	M		A			M		A		A		
Track cycling
Men's sprint									Q/H	¼	½	F			
Men's keirin						H/R	½	F							
Men's 1 km time trial													F		
Men's team sprint	Q		F												
Men's individual pursuit				Q		F									
Men's points race													Q	F	
Men's scratch race									Q		F				
Men's team pursuit	Q		F												
Women's sprint				Q/H	¼	½	F								
Women's keirin													H/R	½	F
Women's 500 m time trial											F				
Women's team sprint	Q		F												
Women's individual pursuit				Q		F									
Women's points race									Q		F				
Women's scratch race													Q	F	
Women's team pursuit	Q		F												
Para-track cycling
Men's tandem sprint B									Q	½	F				
Men's tandem 1 km time trial B			F												
Women's tandem sprint B	Q	½	F												
Women's tandem 1 km time trial B											F				

== Venues ==
Three of the four cycling venues were located within the West Midlands region:

- Myton Fields was the start/finish location for a road race course that circulated through Warwick and Leamington Spa.
- West Park in Wolverhampton was the start/finish location for a road time trial course that stretched to Dudley.
- Cannock Chase Forest was the venue for mountain biking.

In addition, it was decided that the Lee Valley VeloPark in London, more than 100 miles away from Birmingham, would host the track cycling. This caused backlash amongst residents in the West Midlands, and even resulted in a petition that was signed by 6,000 locals that urged for a new velodrome to be built in the West Midlands instead of using one in London. Nonetheless, a new velodrome in the West Midlands was ruled out on grounds of cost.

== Qualification (parasport) ==
A total of 12 para-track cyclists (6 per gender) nominally qualified to compete at the Games. They qualify as follows:

- Athletes in the UCI Individual Tandem B – Track Para Rankings (for performances between 1 January 2021 and 18 April 2022).
- Recipient of a CGF / UCI Bipartite Invitation.

== Medal summary ==
=== Medal table ===
* Host nation (England)

Rank	Nation	Gold	Silver	Bronze	Total
1	Australia	11	3	4	18
2	New Zealand	10	5	2	17
3	England*	2	6	4	12
4	Scotland	1	6	4	11
5	Wales	1	1	5	7
6	Trinidad and Tobago	1	1	1	3
7	Canada	0	3	2	5
8	South Africa	0	1	1	2
9	Malaysia	0	0	1	1
9	Namibia	0	0	1	1
Totals (10 entries)		26	26	25	77

=== Medalists ===
==== Road cycling ====
Event	Gold		Silver		Bronze	
Men's road race	Aaron Gate; New Zealand	3:28:29	Daryl Impey; South Africa	3:28:29	Finn Crockett; Scotland	3:28:29
Men's time trial	Rohan Dennis; Australia	46:21.24	Fred Wright; England	46:47.82	Geraint Thomas; Wales	46:49.73
Women's road race	Georgia Baker; Australia	2:44:46	Neah Evans; Scotland	2:44:46	Sarah Roy; Australia	2:44:46
Women's time trial	Grace Brown; Australia	40:05.20	Anna Henderson; England	40:38.55	Georgia Williams; New Zealand	41:25.27

==== Mountain biking ====
Event	Gold		Silver		Bronze	
Men's cross-country	Sam Gaze; New Zealand	1:34:19	Ben Oliver; New Zealand	1:34:50	Alex Miller; Namibia	1:36:20
Women's cross-country	Evie Richards; England	1:34:59	Zoe Cuthbert; Australia	1:35:46	Candice Lill; South Africa	1:36:12

==== Track cycling ====
===== Men =====
Event	Gold	Silver	Bronze
Sprint	Matthew Richardson; Australia	Nicholas Paul; Trinidad and Tobago	Jack Carlin; Scotland
Team sprint	Australia; Leigh Hoffman; Matthew Richardson; Matthew Glaetzer	England; Ryan Owens; Hamish Turnbull; Joe Truman	New Zealand; Bradly Knipe; Sam Dakin; Sam Webster
Keirin	Nicholas Paul; Trinidad and Tobago	Jack Carlin; Scotland	Shah Sahrom; Malaysia
1 km time trial	Matthew Glaetzer; Australia	Thomas Cornish; Australia	Nicholas Paul; Trinidad and Tobago
Individual pursuit	Aaron Gate; New Zealand	Tom Sexton; New Zealand	Conor Leahy; Australia
Team pursuit	New Zealand; Aaron Gate; Jordan Kerby; Tom Sexton; Campbell Stewart	England; Dan Bigham; Charlie Tanfield; Ethan Vernon; Oli Wood	Australia; Joshua Duffy; Graeme Frislie; Conor Leahy; Lucas Plapp; James Moriarty
Points race	Aaron Gate; New Zealand	Campbell Stewart; New Zealand	Oli Wood; England
Scratch race	Corbin Strong; New Zealand	John Archibald; Scotland	William Roberts; Wales

1. Repecharge athlete

===== Women =====
Event	Gold	Silver	Bronze
Sprint	Ellesse Andrews; New Zealand	Kelsey Mitchell; Canada	Emma Finucane; Wales
Team sprint	New Zealand; Ellesse Andrews; Olivia King; Rebecca Petch	Canada; Lauriane Genest; Kelsey Mitchell; Sarah Orban	Wales; Rhian Edmunds; Emma Finucane; Lowri Thomas
Keirin	Ellesse Andrews; New Zealand	Sophie Capewell; England	Kelsey Mitchell; Canada
500 m time trial	Kristina Clonan; Australia	Kelsey Mitchell; Canada	Sophie Capewell; England
Individual pursuit	Bryony Botha; New Zealand	Maeve Plouffe; Australia	Neah Evans; Scotland
Team pursuit	Australia; Georgia Baker; Sophie Edwards; Chloe Moran; Maeve Plouffe	New Zealand; Ellesse Andrews; Bryony Botha; Michaela Drummond; Emily Shearman	England; Laura Kenny; Josie Knight; Maddie Leech; Sophie Lewis
Points race	Georgia Baker; Australia	Neah Evans; Scotland	Eluned King; Wales
Scratch race	Laura Kenny; England	Michaela Drummond; New Zealand	Maggie Coles-Lyster; Canada

==== Para-track cycling ====
Event	Gold	Silver	Bronze
Men's tandem sprint B	Wales; James Ball; Matt Rotherham (Pilot)	Scotland; Neil Fachie; Lewis Stewart (Pilot)	Australia; Beau Wootton; Luke Zaccaria (Pilot)
Men's tandem 1 km time trial B	Scotland; Neil Fachie; Lewis Stewart (Pilot)	Wales; James Ball; Matt Rotherham (Pilot)	England; Stephen Bate; Christopher Latham (Pilot)
Women's tandem sprint B	Australia; Jessica Gallagher; Caitlin Ward (Pilot)	Scotland; Aileen McGlynn; Ellie Stone (Pilot)	Not awarded.
Women's tandem 1 km time trial B	Australia; Jessica Gallagher; Caitlin Ward (Pilot)	England; Sophie Unwin; Georgia Holt (Pilot)	Scotland; Aileen McGlynn; Ellie Stone (Pilot)
