= Cycling at the 2022 Commonwealth Games – Men's points race =

Cycling Track – Men's points race at the 2022 Commonwealth Games
- Venue: Lee Valley VeloPark
- Dates: 1 August 2022
- Competitors: 23 from 11 nations
- Winning points: 45

Medalists
gold medal	Aaron Gate	New Zealand
silver medal	Campbell Stewart	New Zealand
bronze medal	Oli Wood	England

The men's points race at the 2022 Commonwealth Games, as part of the cycling programme, took place on 1 August 2022.

== Schedule ==
The schedule was as follows:

All times are British Summer Time (UTC+1)

Date	Time	Round
Monday 1 August 2022	17:03	Final

== Results ==
=== Final ===
160 laps (40 km) were raced with 16 sprints.

Rank	Rider	Lap points	Sprint points	Total points
1st place, gold medalist(s)	Aaron Gate (NZL)		45	45
2nd place, silver medalist(s)	Campbell Stewart (NZL)		38	38
3rd place, bronze medalist(s)	Oli Wood (ENG)		35	35
4	John Archibald (SCO)		16	16
5	Mark Stewart (SCO)		15	15
6	Lucas Plapp (AUS)		9	9
7	Joshua Tarling (WAL)		9	9
8	Corbin Strong (NZL)		5	5
9	William Perrett (ENG)		1	1
10	Jyme Bridges (ANT)	-40		DNF
10	Graeme Frislie (AUS)	-40		DNF
10	Conor Leahy (AUS)	-40	1	DNF
10	Jamol Eastmond (BAR)	-40		DNF
10	Michael Foley (CAN)	-40	2	DNF
10	Mathias Guillemette (CAN)	-40		DNF
10	Riley Pickrell (CAN)	-40		DNF
10	Red Walters (GRN)	-40		DNF
10	Naman Kapil (IND)	-40		DNF
10	Venkappa Kengalagutti (IND)	-40		DNF
10	Akil Campbell (TTO)	-60		DNF
10	Rhys Britton (WAL)		5	DNF
10	William Roberts (WAL)	-40	6	DNF
23	Kyle Gordon (SCO)			DNS
