= Cycling at the 2022 Commonwealth Games – Men's scratch race =

Men's scratch race at the 2022 Commonwealth Games
- Venue: Lee Valley VeloPark
- Dates: 31 July 2022
- Competitors: 26 from 13 nations

Medalists
gold medal	Corbin Strong	New Zealand
silver medal	John Archibald	Scotland
bronze medal	William Roberts	Wales

The men's scratch race at the 2022 Commonwealth Games, as part of the cycling programme, took place on 31 July 2022.

== Schedule ==
The schedule was as follows:

All times are British Summer Time (UTC+1)

Date	Time	Round
Sunday 31 July 2022	11:50	Qualification
Sunday 31 July 2022	16:28	Final

== Results ==
=== Qualification ===
Race distance: 30 laps (7.5km). First 10 riders in each heat qualify to final.

Heat 1

Rank	Rider	Laps down	Notes
1	Rhys Britton (WAL)		Q
2	Oliver Wood (ENG)		Q
3	Graeme Frislie (AUS)		Q
4	Corbin Strong (NZL)		Q
5	Campbell Stewart (NZL)		Q
6	Joe Holt (WAL)		Q
7	Michael Foley (CAN)		Q
8	Mark Stewart (SCO)		Q
9	James Moriarty (AUS)		Q
10	Akil Campbell (TTO)		Q
11	Naman Kapil (IND)		
12	Jyme Bridges (ANT)	DNF	
12	Stephen Belle (SEY)	DNF	

Heat 2

The second heat was abandoned after eight riders crashed on the final lap of the race. This included Matthew Bostock, who was carried off on a stretcher and treated onsite for 40 minutes. Mathias Guillemette was disqualified for causing the initial crash.

Rank	Rider	Laps down	Notes
1	Ethan Vernon (ENG)		Q
2	Red Walters (GRN)		Q
3	William Roberts (WAL)		Q
4	John Archibald (SCO)		Q
5	Vishavjeet Singh (IND)		Q
6	Joshua Duffy (AUS)		Q
7	Kyle Gordon (SCO)		Q
8	George Jackson (NZL)		Q
9	Jamol Eastmond (BAR)		Q
10	Derek Gee (CAN)	DNF	
10	Matt Walls (ENG)	DNF	
10	Matthew Bostock (IOM)	DNF	
	Mathias Guillemette (CAN)	DSQ	

=== Final ===
60 laps (15 km) were raced. Kyle Gordon was unable to start the Final due to injuries sustained during the crash in the heats.

Rank	Rider	Laps down
1st place, gold medalist(s)	Corbin Strong (NZL)	
2nd place, silver medalist(s)	John Archibald (SCO)	
3rd place, bronze medalist(s)	William Roberts (WAL)	
4	Ethan Vernon (ENG)	–1
5	Rhys Britton (WAL)	–1
6	Graeme Frislie (AUS)	–1
7	Campbell Stewart (NZL)	–1
8	Oliver Wood (ENG)	–1
9	Joe Holt (WAL)	–1
10	George Jackson (NZL)	–1
11	Mark Stewart (SCO)	–1
12	Michael Foley (CAN)	–1
13	Joshua Duffy (AUS)	DNF
13	James Moriarty (AUS)	DNF
13	Jamol Eastmond (BAR)	DNF
13	Red Walters (GRN)	DNF
13	Vishavjeet Singh (IND)	DNF
13	Akil Campbell (TTO)	DNF
19	Kyle Gordon (SCO)	DNS
