= New Zealand at the 2022 Commonwealth Games =

- Flag of New Zealand
- CG code: NZL
- CGA: New Zealand Olympic Committee
- Website: olympic.org.nz

in Birmingham, England 28 July 2022 – 8 August 2022
- Competitors: 233 (108 men and 125 women) in 19 sports
- Flag bearers (opening): Tom Walsh; Joelle King
- Flag bearer (closing): Aaron Gate
- Officials: Nigel Avery (chef de mission)
- Medals Ranked 5th: Gold 20 Silver 12 Bronze 18 Total 50

Commonwealth Games appearances (overview)
- 1930; 1934; 1938; 1950; 1954; 1958; 1962; 1966; 1970; 1974; 1978; 1982; 1986; 1990; 1994; 1998; 2002; 2006; 2010; 2014; 2018; 2022; 2026; 2030

New Zealand competed at the 2022 Commonwealth Games held in Birmingham, England, from 28 July to 8 August 2022. It is New Zealand's 22nd appearance at the Commonwealth Games, having competed at every Games since their inception in 1930. New Zealand finished fifth on the medal table, winning a total of 50 medals, 20 of which were gold. This makes these games New Zealand's best performance ever in terms of gold medals, beating the 17 won in Auckland at the 1990 Commonwealth Games, but third overall in terms of total medals, with 50, behind the 58 in 1990, and the 53 at the Games also in Auckland.

Tom Walsh and Joelle King served as the country's flagbearers during the opening ceremony. The flagbearer at the closing ceremony was cyclist Aaron Gate, who won four gold medals at the Games.

== Medal tables ==
Unless otherwise stated, all dates and times are in British Summer Time (UTC+1), 11 hours behind New Zealand Standard Time (UTC+12).

Medal	Name	Sport	Event	Date
Gold	Aaron Gate; Jordan Kerby; Tom Sexton; Campbell Stewart	Cycling – track	Men's team pursuit	29 July
Gold	Ellesse Andrews; Olivia King; Rebecca Petch	Cycling – track	Women's team sprint	29 July
Gold	Sophie Pascoe	Swimming	Women's 100 m freestyle S9	29 July
Gold	Bryony Botha	Cycling – track	Women's individual pursuit	30 July
Gold	Aaron Gate	Cycling – track	Men's individual pursuit	30 July
Gold	Ellesse Andrews	Cycling – track	Women's sprint	30 July
Gold	Lewis Clareburt	Swimming	Men's 400 m individual medley	30 July
Gold	Corbin Strong	Cycling – track	Men's scratch race	31 July
Gold	Lewis Clareburt	Swimming	Men's 200 m butterfly	31 July
Gold	Joshua Willmer	Swimming	Men's 100 m breaststroke SB8	31 July
Gold	Ellesse Andrews	Cycling – track	Women's keirin	1 August
Gold	Aaron Gate	Cycling – track	Men's points race	1 August
Gold	Andrew Jeffcoat	Swimming	Men's 50 m backstroke	1 August
Gold	Sam Gaze	Cycling – mountain bike	Men's cross-country	3 August
Gold	Hamish Kerr	Athletics	Men's high jump	3 August
Gold	Paul Coll	Squash	Men's singles	3 August
Gold	Tom Walsh	Athletics	Men's shot put	5 August
Gold	Aaron Gate	Cycling – road	Men's road race	7 August
Gold	Paul Coll; Joelle King	Squash	Mixed doubles	7 August
Gold	Joelle King; Amanda Landers-Murphy	Squash	Women's doubles	8 August
Silver	Hayden Wilde	Triathlon	Men's individual	29 July
Silver	Ellesse Andrews; Bryony Botha; Michaela Drummond; Emily Shearman	Cycling – track	Women's team pursuit	29 July
Silver	Jesse Reynolds	Swimming	Men's 100 m backstroke S9	29 July
Silver	Tom Sexton	Cycling – track	Men's individual pursuit	30 July
Silver	Tupou Neiufi	Swimming	Women's 100 m backstroke S8	31 July
Silver	Michaela Drummond	Cycling – track	Women's scratch race	1 August
Silver	Campbell Stewart	Cycling – track	Men's points race	1 August
Silver	Ben Oliver	Cycling – mountain bike	Men's cross-country	3 August
Silver	Kody Andrews	Judo	Men's +100 kg	3 August
Silver	David Liti	Weightlifting	Men's +109 kg	3 August
Silver	Jacko Gill	Athletics	Men's shot put	5 August
Silver	Julia Ratcliffe	Athletics	Women's hammer throw	6 August
Bronze	Sam Dakin; Bradly Knipe; Sam Webster	Cycling – track	Men's team sprint	29 July
Bronze	Cameron Gray	Swimming	Men's 50 m butterfly	30 July
Bronze	New Zealand women's rugby sevens team: Shiray Kaka; Sarah Hirini; Michaela Blyde; Tyla Nathan-Wong; Kelly Brazier; Theresa Fitzpatrick; Portia Woodman; Risi Pouri-Lane; Stacey Fluhler; Niall Williams; Alena Saili; Jazmin Hotham	Rugby sevens	Women's tournament	31 July
Bronze	New Zealand men's rugby sevens team: Tone Ng Shiu; Dylan Collier; Ngarohi McGarvey-Black; Sam Dickson; Caleb Tangitau; Leroy Carter; Joe Webber; Che Clark; Akuila Rokolisoa; Regan Ware; Sione Molia; Moses Leo	Rugby sevens	Men's tournament	31 July
Bronze	Tayla Bruce; Selina Goddard; Val Smith; Nicole Toomey	Lawn bowls	Women's fours	2 August
Bronze	Imogen Ayris	Athletics	Women's pole vault	2 August
Bronze	Moira de Villiers	Judo	Women's 78 kg	3 August
Bronze	Sydnee Andrews	Judo	Women's +78 kg	3 August
Bronze	Lewis Clareburt	Swimming	Men's 200 m individual medley	3 August
Bronze	Maddi Wesche	Athletics	Women's shot put	3 August
Bronze	Georgia Williams	Cycling – road	Women's time trial	4 August
Bronze	Tayla Ford	Wrestling	Women's 68 kg	5 August
Bronze	Tayla Bruce; Val Smith; Nicole Toomey	Lawn bowls	Women's triples	5 August
Bronze	Selina Goddard; Katelyn Inch	Lawn bowls	Women's pairs	6 August
Bronze	Suraj Singh	Wrestling	Men's 57 kg	6 August
Bronze	Uila Mau'u	Boxing	Men's super heavyweight	6 August
Bronze	New Zealand women's cricket team: Suzie Bates; Eden Carson; Sophie Devine; Izzy Gaze; Claudia Green; Maddy Green; Brooke Halliday; Hayley Jensen; Fran Jonas; Amelia Kerr; Rosemary Mair; Jess McFadyen; Georgia Plimmer; Hannah Rowe; Lea Tahuhu	Cricket	Women's tournament	7 August
Bronze	New Zealand women's netball team: Gina Crampton; Kate Heffernan; Kayla Johnson; Kelly Jury; Phoenix Karaka; Bailey Mes; Grace Nweke; Shannon Saunders; Te Paea Selby-Rickit; Whitney Souness; Sulu Tone-Fitzpatrick; Maia Wilson	Netball	Women's tournament	7 August

Medals by sport
Sport	Gold medal	Silver medal	Bronze medal	Total
Cycling	10	5	2	17
Swimming	5	2	2	9
Athletics	2	2	2	6
Squash	3	0	0	3
Judo	0	1	2	3
Triathlon	0	1	0	1
Weightlifting	0	1	0	1
Lawn bowls	0	0	3	3
Rugby sevens	0	0	2	2
Wrestling	0	0	2	1
Boxing	0	0	1	1
Cricket	0	0	1	1
Netball	0	0	1	1
Total	20	12	18	50

Medals by date
Date	Gold medal	Silver medal	Bronze medal	Total
29 July	3	3	1	7
30 July	4	1	1	6
31 July	3	1	2	6
1 August	3	2	0	5
2 August	0	0	2	2
3 August	3	3	4	10
4 August	0	0	1	1
5 August	1	1	2	4
6 August	0	1	3	4
7 August	2	0	2	4
8 August	1	0	0	1
Total	20	12	18	50

Medals by gender
Gender	Gold medal	Silver medal	Bronze medal	Total
Male	13	8	6	27
Female	6	4	12	22
Mixed / open	1	0	0	1
Total	20	12	18	50

== Administration ==
Nigel Avery is Chef de Mission.

== Competitors ==
The following is the list of number of competitors participating at the Games per sport/discipline.

Sport	Men	Women	Total
Athletics	7	10	17
Badminton	1	1	2
3x3 basketball	4	4	8
Beach volleyball	2	2	4
Boxing	5	3	8
Cricket	—N/a	15	15
Cycling	18	12	30
Diving	5	2	7
Gymnastics	5	2	7
Hockey	18	18	36
Judo	3	4	7
Lawn bowls	8	8	16 (Note: Plus 2 directors)
Netball	—N/a	12	12
Rugby sevens	13	13	26
Squash	3	4	7
Swimming	5	7	12
Triathlon	3	3	6
Weightlifting	4	3	7
Wrestling	4	2	6
Total	108	125	233

== Athletics ==
A squad of eighteen athletes (eight men, ten women) was officially selected on 20 May 2022.

=== Track and road ===
Athlete	Event	Heat		Semifinal		Final	
Athlete	Event	Result	Rank	Result	Rank	Result	Rank
Geordie Beamish	Men's 5000 m	—N/a				13:21.71	6
Portia Bing	Women's 400 m hurdles	56.32	3 Q	—N/a		56.36	7
Zoe Hobbs	Women's 100 m	11.09	2 Q	11.15	2 Q	11.19	6
Quentin Rew	Men's 10,000 m walk	—N/a				DQ	
Sam Tanner	Men's 1500 m	3:48.65	5 Q	—N/a		3:31.34	6

=== Field ===
Athlete	Event	Qualification		Final	
Athlete	Event	Result	Rank	Result	Rank
Imogen Ayris	Women's pole vault	—N/a		4.45	3rd place, bronze medalist(s)
Connor Bell	Men's discus throw	59.47	6 q	60.23	8
Nicole Bradley	Women's hammer throw	61.77	8 q	63.10	9
Lauren Bruce	Women's hammer throw	NM		did not advance	
Jacko Gill	Men's shot put	—N/a		21.90	2nd place, silver medalist(s)
Hamish Kerr	Men's high jump	—N/a		2.25	1st place, gold medalist(s)
Olivia McTaggart	Women's pole vault	—N/a		4.45	4
Keeley O'Hagan	Women's high jump	1.81	=8 q	1.89	6
Tori Peeters	Women's javelin throw	—N/a		57.86	5
Julia Ratcliffe	Women's hammer throw	68.73	2 Q	69.63	2nd place, silver medalist(s)
Tom Walsh	Men's shot put	—N/a		22.26	1st place, gold medalist(s)
Maddi Wesche	Women's shot put	18.08	3 Q	18.84	3rd place, bronze medalist(s)

== Badminton ==
Two players were officially selected on 27 May 2022.

Athlete	Event	Round of 64	Round of 32	Round of 16	Quarterfinal	Semifinal	Final / BM	Rank
Athlete	Event	Opposition Score	Opposition Score	Opposition Score	Opposition Score	Opposition Score	Opposition Score	Rank
Oliver Leydon-Davis; Anona Pak	Mixed doubles	Bye	Bongout / Leung (MRI); W 2–0	Pham / Yu (AUS); W 2–0	Hee / Tan (SGP); L 0–2	did not advance		=5

== 3x3 basketball ==
By virtue of its status as the top Commonwealth Oceanian nation in the respective FIBA 3x3 Federation Rankings for men and women (on 1 November 2021), New Zealand qualified for both tournaments.

The rosters for both tournaments were announced on 30 June 2022.

Summary

Team	Event	Preliminary round				Quarterfinal	Semifinal	Final / BM	Rank
Team	Event	Opposition Result	Opposition Result	Opposition Result	Rank	Opposition Result	Opposition Result	Opposition Result	Rank
New Zealand men	Men's tournament	England; L 10–21	Australia; L 11–21	Trinidad and Tobago; W 21–12	3 Q	Canada; L 18–21	did not advance		6
New Zealand women	Women's tournament	England; W 15–14	Canada; W 21–11	British Virgin Islands; W 19–5	1 Q	Bye	Canada; L 11–16	Australia; L 13–15	4

=== Men's tournament ===
Roster

- Jayden Bezzant
- Dominique Kelman-Poto
- Nikau McCullough
- Tai Wynyard

Group B

Pos	Team	Pld	W	L	PF	PA	PD	Qualification
1	England (H)	3	3	0	59	28	+31	Direct to semi-finals
2	Australia	3	2	1	54	34	+20	Quarter-finals
3	New Zealand	3	1	2	42	54	−12	Quarter-finals
4	Trinidad and Tobago	3	0	3	24	63	−39	

Source: Birmingham 2022
Rules for classification: 1) Wins; 2) Head-to-head record; 3) Points scored.
(H) Hosts

30 July 2022
15:30

Report

New Zealand	10–21	England
Pts: Bezzant 4		Pts: Jackman 9

Smithfield

30 July 2022
19:30

Report

Australia	21–11	New Zealand
Pts: Johnson 9		Pts: Bezzant 4

Smithfield

31 July 2022
19:30

Report

New Zealand	21–12	Trinidad and Tobago
Pts: Wynyard 8		Pts: Lewis 6

Smithfield

Quarter-final

1 August 2022
15:00

Report

Canada	21–18	New Zealand
Pts: Gill 8		Pts: Bezzant 14

Smithfield

=== Women's tournament ===
Roster

- Tiarna Clarke
- Ella Fotu
- Jillian Harmon
- Kalani Purcell

Group B

Pos	Team	Pld	W	L	PF	PA	PD	Qualification
1	New Zealand	3	3	0	55	30	+25	Direct to semi-finals
2	England (H)	3	2	1	57	37	+20	Quarter-finals
3	Canada	3	1	2	50	48	+2	Quarter-finals
4	British Virgin Islands	3	0	3	16	63	−47	

Source: Birmingham 2022
Rules for classification: 1) Wins; 2) Head-to-head record; 3) Points scored.
(H) Hosts

30 July 2022
15:30

Report

New Zealand	15–14	England
Pts: Harmon 7		Pts: Green 7

Smithfield

30 July 2022
19:30

Report

Canada	11–21	New Zealand
Pts: Te-Biasu 6		Pts: Clarke 9

Smithfield

31 July 2022
19:30

Report

New Zealand	19–5	British Virgin Islands
Pts: Harmon 10		Pts: Fahie 4

Smithfield

Semi-final

1 August 2022
19:30

Report

New Zealand	11–16	Canada
Pts: Harmon, Fotu 4		Pts: Wallack 8

Smithfield

Bronze medal match

2 August 2022
15:00

Report

Australia	15–13	New Zealand
Pts: Whittle 9		Pts: Harmon 7

Smithfield

== Beach volleyball ==
By virtue of their position in the extended FIVB Beach Volleyball World Rankings (based on performances between 16 April 2018 and 31 March 2022), New Zealand qualified for both tournaments.

Four players were selected on 9 June 2022.

Athlete	Event	Preliminary Round				Quarterfinals	Semifinals	Final / BM	Rank
Athlete	Event	Opposition Score	Opposition Score	Opposition Score	Rank	Opposition Score	Opposition Score	Opposition Score	Rank
Sam O'Dea; Brad Fuller	Men's tournament	Liotatis / Zorbis (CYP); W 2–0	Malosa / Issac (TUV); W 2–0	Bello / Bello (ENG); W 2–0	1 Q	Gatsinzi / Ntagengwa (RWA); L 0–2	did not advance		=5
Alice Zeimann; Shaunna Polley	Women's tournament	Khadambi / Makokha (KEN); W 2–0	Aryee / Katadat (GHA); W 2–0	Humana-Paredes / Pavan (CAN); L 0–2	2 Q	Grimson / Mumby (ENG); W 2–0	Humana-Paredes / Pavan (CAN); L 1–2	Pata / Toko (VAN); L 1–2	4

=== Men's tournament ===
Group C

Pos	Team	Pld	W	L	Pts	SW	SL	SR	SPW	SPL	SPR	Qualification
1	O'Dea – Fuller (NZL)	3	3	0	6	6	0	MAX	126	97	1.299	Quarterfinals
2	Bello – Bello (ENG)	3	2	1	5	4	2	2.000	119	93	1.280	Quarterfinals
3	Liotatis – Zorbis (CYP)	3	1	2	4	2	4	0.500	102	114	0.895	Ranking of third-placed teams
4	Malosa – Issac (TUV)	3	0	3	3	0	6	0.000	83	126	0.659	

Source: birmingham2022.com

Qualified for the Quarterfinals

30 July 2022; 19:00	O'Dea – Fuller (NZL)	2–0	Liotatis – Zorbis (CYP)	Smithfield
30 July 2022; 19:00	(21–18, 21–13); Report			Smithfield

1 August 2022; 19:00	O'Dea – Fuller (NZL)	2–0	Malosa – Issac (TUV)	Smithfield
1 August 2022; 19:00	(21–14, 21–17); Report			Smithfield

3 August 2022; 19:00	Bello – Bello (ENG)	0–2	O'Dea – Fuller (NZL)	Smithfield
3 August 2022; 19:00	(19–21, 16–21); Report			Smithfield

Quarter-final

5 August 2022; 11:00	O'Dea – Fuller (NZL)	0–2	Ntagengwa – Gatsinze (RWA)	Smithfield
5 August 2022; 11:00	(18–21, 19–21); Report			Smithfield

=== Women's tournament ===
Group A

Pos	Team	Pld	W	L	Pts	SW	SL	SR	SPW	SPL	SPR	Qualification
1	Humana-Paredes – Pavan (CAN)	3	3	0	6	6	0	MAX	137	73	1.877	Quarterfinals
2	Zeimann – Polley (NZL)	3	2	1	5	4	2	2.000	124	105	1.181	Quarterfinals
3	Khadambi – Makokha (KEN)	3	1	2	4	2	5	0.400	101	134	0.754	Ranking of third-placed teams
4	Aryee – Katadat (GHA)	3	0	3	3	1	6	0.167	86	138	0.623	

Source: birmingham2022.com

Qualified for the Quarterfinals

30 July 2022; 19:00	Zeimann – Polley (NZL)	2–0	Khadambi – Makokha (KEN)	Smithfield
30 July 2022; 19:00	(21–10, 21–19); Report			Smithfield

1 August 2022; 19:00	Zeimann – Polley (NZL)	2–0	Aryee – Katadat (GHA)	Smithfield
1 August 2022; 19:00	(21–10, 21–13); Report			Smithfield

3 August 2022; 19:00	Humana-Paredes – Pavan (CAN)	2–0	Zeimann – Polley (NZL)	Smithfield
3 August 2022; 19:00	(32–30, 21–10); Report			Smithfield

Quarter-final

5 August 2022; 20:00	Zeimann – Polley (NZL)	2–0	Grimson – Mumby (ENG)	Smithfield
5 August 2022; 20:00	(21–13, 21–15); Report			Smithfield

Semi-final

6 August 2022; 20:00	Humana-Paredes – Pavan (CAN)	2–1	Zeimann – Polley (NZL)	Smithfield
6 August 2022; 20:00	(29–31, 21–14, 19–17); Report			Smithfield

Bronze medal match

7 August 2022; 20:00	Zeimann – Polley (NZL)	1–2	Pata – Toko (VAN)	Smithfield
7 August 2022; 20:00	(21–10, 20–22, 10–15); Report			Smithfield

== Boxing ==
A squad of eight boxers (five men, three women) was officially selected on 23 June 2022. Emile Richardson was later called up to replace David Nyika, whose left hand injury ruled out the possibility of his boxing for a third consecutive gold medal.

Athlete	Event	Round of 32	Round of 16	Quarterfinals	Semifinals	Final	Rank
Athlete	Event	Opposition Result	Opposition Result	Opposition Result	Opposition Result	Opposition Result	Rank
Alex Mukuka	Men's featherweight	Bye	Molwantwa (BOT); W 3–2	Commey (GHA); L 0–5	did not advance		=5
Wendell Stanley	Men's light middleweight	Bye	Dlamini (SWZ); W RSC	Muxanga (MOZ); L 0–3	did not advance		=5
Emile Richardson	Men's middleweight	Bye	Amsterdam (GUY); L 2–3	did not advance			=9
Onyx Le	Men's light heavyweight	Bevan (WAL); L KO	did not advance				=17
Uila Mau'u	Men's super heavyweight	—N/a	Bye	Regis (LCA); W KO	Orie (ENG); L 0–5	Did not advance	3rd place, bronze medalist(s)
Erin Walsh	Women's featherweight	—N/a	Oshoba (NGR); L 0–5	did not advance			=9
Troy Garton	Women's lightweight	—N/a	Bye	Jaismine (IND); L 1–4	did not advance		=5
Ariane Nicholson	Women's light middleweight	—N/a	Borgohain (IND); L 0–5	did not advance			=9

== Cricket ==
By virtue of its position in the ICC Women's T20I rankings (as of 1 April 2021), New Zealand qualified for the tournament.

Fixtures were announced in November 2021.

Summary

Team	Event	Group stage				Semifinal	Final / BM	
Team	Event	Opposition Result	Opposition Result	Opposition Result	Rank	Opposition Result	Opposition Result	Rank
New Zealand women	Women's tournament	South Africa; W	Sri Lanka; W	England; L	2 Q	Australia; L	England; W	3rd place, bronze medalist(s)

Roster

Fifteen players were selected on 8 June 2022. Lauren Down and Jess Kerr have since withdrawn from the squad, with Claudia Green and Lea Tahuhu called up to replace them.

- Sophie Devine (c)
- Suzie Bates
- Eden Carson
- Izzy Gaze
- Claudia Green
- Maddy Green
- Brooke Halliday
- Hayley Jensen
- Fran Jonas
- Amelia Kerr
- Rosemary Mair
- Jess McFadyen
- Georgia Plimmer
- Hannah Rowe
- Lea Tahuhu

Group stage

Pos	Team	Pld	W	L	NR	Pts	NRR
1	England	3	3	0	0	6	1.826
2	New Zealand	3	2	1	0	4	0.068
3	South Africa	3	1	2	0	2	1.118
4	Sri Lanka	3	0	3	0	0	−2.805

Source: ESPNcricinfo

30 July 2022
11:00
Scorecard

New Zealand; 167/2 (20 overs)	v	South Africa; 154/7 (20 overs)
Suzie Bates 91* (64); Nonkululeko Mlaba 1/33 (4 overs)		Chloe Tryon 39 (17); Sophie Devine 3/37 (4 overs)

New Zealand won by 13 runs
Edgbaston, Birmingham
Umpires: Claire Polosak (Aus) and Vrinda Rathi (Ind)
Player of the match: Suzie Bates (NZ)

- South Africa won the toss and elected to field.
- Eden Carson, Izzy Gaze and Fran Jonas (NZ) all made their WT20I debuts.
- Sophie Devine (NZ) took her 100th wicket in WT20Is.

2 August 2022
18:00 (D/N)
Scorecard

New Zealand; 147/7 (20 overs)	v	Sri Lanka; 102/8 (20 overs)
Suzie Bates 34 (32); Inoka Ranaweera 3/30 (4 overs)		Nilakshi de Silva 36 (35); Hayley Jensen 3/5 (4 overs)

New Zealand won by 45 runs
Edgbaston, Birmingham
Umpires: Eloise Sheridan (Aus) and Jacqueline Williams (WI)
Player of the match: Hayley Jensen (NZ)

- New Zealand won the toss and elected to bat.

4 August 2022
18:00 (D/N)
Scorecard

New Zealand; 71/9 (20 overs)	v	England; 72/3 (11.4 overs)
Maddy Green 19 (24); Katherine Brunt 2/4 (3 overs)		Alice Capsey 23 (19); Amelia Kerr 2/27 (4 overs)

England won by 7 wickets
Edgbaston, Birmingham
Umpires: Vrinda Rathi (Ind) and Eloise Sheridan (Aus)
Player of the match: Katherine Brunt (Eng)

- New Zealand won the toss and elected to bat.

Semi-final

6 August 2022
18:00 (D/N)
Scorecard

New Zealand; 144/7 (20 overs)	v	Australia; 145/5 (19.3 overs)
Sophie Devine 53 (48); Megan Schutt 3/20 (4 overs)		Beth Mooney 36 (29); Lea Tahuhu 3/20 (4 overs)

Australia won by 5 wickets
Edgbaston, Birmingham
Umpires: Lauren Agenbag (SA) and Jacqueline Williams (WI)
Player of the match: Sophie Devine (NZ)

- Australia won the toss and elected to field.
- Georgia Plimmer (NZ) made her WT20I debut.

Bronze medal match

7 August 2022
10:00
Scorecard

England; 110/9 (20 overs)	v	New Zealand; 111/2 (11.5 overs)
Nat Sciver 27 (19); Hayley Jensen 3/24 (4 overs)		Sophie Devine 51* (40); Nat Sciver 1/8 (1 over)

New Zealand won by 8 wickets
Edgbaston, Birmingham
Umpires: Lauren Agenbag (SA) and Eloise Sheridan (Aus)
Player of the match: Sophie Devine (NZ)

- England won the toss and elected to bat.

== Cycling ==
A squad of thirty cyclists (eighteen men, twelve women) was officially selected on 10 June 2022. Ally Wollaston was unable to compete after injuring a wrist in a crash during stage 2 of the 2022 Tour de France Femmes.

=== Road ===
Road race

Athlete	Event	Time	Rank
Shane Archbold	Men's road race	3:37:08	30
Jack Bauer	Men's road race	3:36:46	17
Patrick Bevin	Men's road race	3:37:08	22
Aaron Gate	Men's road race	3:28:29	1st place, gold medalist(s)
Dion Smith	Men's road race	3:37:08	53
Campbell Stewart	Men's road race	3:37:20	59
Henrietta Christie	Women's road race	2:44:57	32
Niamh Fisher-Black	Women's road race	2:44:46	17
Ella Harris	Women's road race	2:44:57	31
Mikayla Harvey	Women's road race	2:44:57	30
Georgia Williams	Women's road race	2:44:46	13

Time trial

Athlete	Event	Time	Rank
Aaron Gate	Men's time trial	48:43.28	4
Tom Sexton	Men's time trial	49:41.52	9
Henrietta Christie	Women's time trial	DNS	
Mikayla Harvey	Women's time trial	44:55.84	20
Georgia Williams	Women's time trial	41:25.27	3rd place, bronze medalist(s)

=== Track ===
Sprint

Athlete	Event	Qualification		Round 1	Quarterfinals	Semifinals	Final / BM	
Athlete	Event	Time	Rank	Opposition Time	Opposition Time	Opposition Time	Opposition Time	Rank
Sam Dakin	Men's sprint	9.928	10 Q	Shah Firdaus (MAS); L	did not advance			
Callum Saunders	Men's sprint	10.060	17	Did not advance				
Sam Webster	Men's sprint	10.033	16 Q	Paul (TTO); L	did not advance			
Sam Webster; Sam Dakin; Bradly Knipe; Callum Saunders	Men's team sprint	43.974	3 QB	—N/a			Canada; W 43.856	3rd place, bronze medalist(s)
Ellesse Andrews	Women's sprint	10.869	6 Q	Hargrave (AUS); W 11.854	Genest (CAN); L, W 11.407, W 11.514	Capewell (ENG); W 11.144, W 11.033	Mitchell (CAN); W 11.175, W 11.172	1st place, gold medalist(s)
Olivia King	Women's sprint	11.175	14 Q	Genest (CAN); L	did not advance			
Rebecca Petch	Women's sprint	11.209	16 Q	Mitchell (CAN); L	did not advance			
Ellesse Andrews; Rebecca Petch; Olivia King	Women's team sprint	47.841 GR	1 QG	—N/a			Canada; W 47.425 GR	1st place, gold medalist(s)

Keirin

Athlete	Event	1st Round	Repechage	Semifinals	Final
Athlete	Event	Rank	Rank	Rank	Rank
Sam Dakin	Men's keirin	2 Q	Bye	4	10
Callum Saunders	Men's keirin	2 Q	Bye	2 Q	5
Sam Webster	Men's keirin	2 Q	Bye	4	7
Ellesse Andrews	Women's keirin	1 Q	Bye	1 Q	1st place, gold medalist(s)
Olivia King	Women's keirin	4 R	2	did not advance	

Time trial

Athlete	Event	Time	Rank
Nick Kergozou	Men's 1 km time trial	1:01.076	5
Rebecca Petch	Women's 500 m time trial	33.843	4

Pursuit

Athlete	Event	Qualification		Final	
Athlete	Event	Time	Rank	Opponent Results	Rank
Aaron Gate	Men's individual pursuit	4:07.129 GR	1 QG	Sexton (NZL); W 4:07.760	1st place, gold medalist(s)
Tom Sexton	Men's individual pursuit	4:08.689	2 QG	Gate (NZL); L 4:12.179	2nd place, silver medalist(s)
Aaron Gate; Campbell Stewart; Jordan Kerby; Nick Kergozou; Tom Sexton	Men's team pursuit	3:49.821	1 QG	England; W 3:47.575 GR	1st place, gold medalist(s)
Bryony Botha	Women's individual pursuit	3:19.836 GR	1 QG	Plouffe (AUS); W 3:18.456 GR	1st place, gold medalist(s)
Bryony Botha; Emily Shearman; Michaela Drummond; Ellesse Andrews	Women's team pursuit	4:18.434	2 QG	Australia; L 4:17.984	2nd place, silver medalist(s)

Points race

Athlete	Event	Points	Rank
Aaron Gate	Men's point race	45	1st place, gold medalist(s)
Campbell Stewart	Men's point race	38	2nd place, silver medalist(s)
Corbin Strong	Men's point race	5	8
Bryony Botha	Women's points race	55	8
Michaela Drummond	Women's points race	70	5
Emily Shearman	Women's points race	50	9

Scratch race

Athlete	Event	Qualification	Final
George Jackson	Men's scratch race	8 Q	10
Campbell Stewart	Men's scratch race	5 Q	7
Corbin Strong	Men's scratch race	4 Q	1st place, gold medalist(s)
Bryony Botha	Women's scratch race	—N/a	DNF
Michaela Drummond	Women's scratch race	—N/a	2nd place, silver medalist(s)
Emily Shearman	Women's scratch race	—N/a	16

=== Mountain bike ===
Anton Cooper was selected for the men's cross-country, but had to withdraw the day before the event after testing positive for COVID-19.

Athlete	Event	Time	Rank
Sam Gaze	Men's cross-country	1:34:19	1st place, gold medalist(s)
Ben Oliver	Men's cross-country	1:34:50	2nd place, silver medalist(s)

== Diving ==
A squad of eight divers (six men, two women) was officially selected on 1 June 2022. Anton Down-Jenkins withdrew from the squad on 12 July 2022.

Athlete	Event	Preliminaries		Final	
Athlete	Event	Points	Rank	Points	Rank
Nathan Brown	Men's 10 m platform	368.60	8 Q	397.35	9
Mikali Dawson	Women's 10 m platform	181.85	14	did not advance	
Luke Sipkes	Men's 10 m platform	311.15	12 Q	279.30	12
Maggie Squire	Women's 1 m springboard	208.65	9 Q	232.60	10
Maggie Squire	Women's 3 m springboard	190.00	13	did not advance	
Liam Stone	Men's 1 m springboard	362.35	7 Q	377.90	6
Liam Stone	Men's 3 m springboard	387.85	8 Q	397.90	8
Frazer Tavener	Men's 3 m springboard	326.40	12 Q	312.60	12
Arno Lee; Luke Sipkes	Men's synchronised 10 m platform	—N/a		328.71	6
Maggie Squire; Frazer Tavener	Mixed synchronised 3 m springboard	—N/a		244.89	9

== Gymnastics ==
A team of five artistic gymnasts and two rhythmic gymnasts was officially selected on 19 May 2022.

=== Artistic ===
Team final and individual qualification

Athlete	Event	Apparatus						Total	Rank
Athlete	Event	F	PH	R	V	PB	HB	Total	Rank
Ethan Dick	Men's team all-around	12.400	13.400	12.700	13.850	11.150	12.600	76.100	14
Sam Dick	Men's team all-around	12.500	—	13.200	13.850	12.450	12.150	—	—
William Fu-Allen	Men's team all-around	12.350	8.200	12.350	—	—	—	—	—
Mikhail Koudinov	Men's team all-around	12.750	11.550	13.150	13.900	13.750	11.650	76.750	13
Jorden O'Connell-Inns	Men's team all-around	—	13.200	—	13.850	12.550	10.600	—	—
Total	Men's team all-around	37.650	38.150	39.050	41.600	38.750	36.400	231.600	7

Individual all-around final

Mikhail Koudinov and Ethan Dick qualified for the men's individual all-around final.

Athlete	Event	Apparatus						Total	Rank
Athlete	Event	F	PH	R	V	PB	HB	Total	Rank
Ethan Dick	Men's individual all-around	11.450	13.850	12.550	13.450	13.800	12.400	77.500	9
Mikhail Koudinov	Men's individual all-around	Withdrew due to injury							

Apparatus finals

Ethan Dick qualified sixth for the men's pommel horse final, and Sam Dick qualified eighth for the men's vault final. Sam Dick was 14th in qualifying for the rings, but progressed to the final as third reserve.

Athlete	Event	Total	Rank
Ethan Dick	Men's pommel horse	13.666	4
Sam Dick	Men's rings	12.900	8
Sam Dick	Men's vault	13.783	5

=== Rhythmic ===
Individual qualification

Athlete	Event	Apparatus				Total	Rank
Athlete	Event	Hoop	Ball	Clubs	Ribbon	Total	Rank
Paris Chin	Qualification	24.400	25.600	26.500	24.400	100.900	17 Q
Havana Hopman	Qualification	26.200	23.400	27.000	25.250	101.850	16 Q

Individual finals

Athlete	Event	Apparatus				Total	Rank
Athlete	Event	Hoop	Ball	Clubs	Ribbon	Total	Rank
Paris Chin	All-around	26.400	20.400	26.800	23.600	97.200	14
Havana Hopman	All-around	26.700	25.300	27.300	25.800	105.100	9

Athlete	Apparatus	Score	Rank
Havana Hopman	Clubs	27.800	4

== Hockey ==
By virtue of their position in the FIH World Rankings for men and women respectively (as of 1 February 2022), New Zealand qualified for both tournaments.

Detailed fixtures were released on 9 March 2022. The women's squad was announced on 9 June 2022, followed by the men's squad on 30 June 2022.

=== Summary ===
Team	Event	Preliminary round					Semifinal	Final / BM / CM	
Team	Event	Opposition Result	Opposition Result	Opposition Result	Opposition Result	Rank	Opposition Result	Opposition Result	Rank
New Zealand men	Men's tournament	Scotland; D 5–5	Pakistan; W 4–1	Australia; L 2–7	South Africa; L 3–4	3	—N/a	Wales; W 2–1	5
New Zealand women	Women's tournament	Kenya; W 16–0	Scotland; W 1–0	Australia; L 0–1	South Africa; W 4–1	2 Q	England; 0–0 FT; L 0–2 P	India; 1–1 FT; L 1–2 P	4

=== Men's tournament ===
Roster

- David Brydon
- George Enersen
- Sean Findlay
- Leon Hayward
- Sam Hiha
- Hugo Inglis
- Sam Lane
- Dane Lett
- Harry Miskimmin
- Joe Morrison
- Hayden Phillips
- Kane Russell
- Aidan Sarikaya
- Jacob Smith
- Blair Tarrant
- Dylan Thomas
- Nic Woods
- Simon Yorston

Group play

Pos	Team	Pld	W	D	L	GF	GA	GD	Pts	Qualification
1	Australia	4	4	0	0	29	2	+27	12	Semi-finals
2	South Africa	4	2	1	1	11	12	−1	7	Semi-finals
3	New Zealand	4	1	1	2	14	17	−3	4	Fifth place match
4	Pakistan	4	1	1	2	6	15	−9	4	Seventh place match
5	Scotland	4	0	1	3	11	25	−14	1	Ninth place match

Source: Birmingham 2022
Rules for classification: 1) points; 2) number of wins; 3) goal difference; 4) goals scored; 5) head-to-head results.

29 July 2022
21:00

New Zealand	5–5	Scotland
Russell 26'; Lane 43'; Smith 47'; Inglis 49'; Hiha 51'	Report	Harwood 6'; Mackenzie 17'; J. Golden 20', 28'; C. Golden 24'

Umpires:
Tyler Klenk (CAN)
Peter Kabaso (KEN)

31 July 2022
09:00

New Zealand	4–1	Pakistan
Inglis 17', 18'; Thomas 43'; Lane 60'	Report	G. Ali 26'

Umpires:
Dan Barstow (ENG)
Tyler Klenk (CAN)

1 August 2022
19:00

New Zealand	2–7	Australia
Inglis 17'; Smith 44'	Report	Anderson 8'; Govers 22', 24'; Whetton 27'; Ephraums 37'; Zalewski 44', 48'

Umpires:
Dan Barstow (ENG)
Ilanggo Kanabathu (MAS)

4 August 2022
19:00

South Africa	4–3	New Zealand
Guise-Brown 3', 18'; Horne 7'; Beauchamp 53'	Report	Lane 9'; Smith 39'; Inglis 47'

Umpires:
Dan Barstow (ENG)
Bruce Bale (ENG)

Fifth place match

7 August 2022
18:00

New Zealand	2–1	Wales
Woods 7'; Findlay 41'	Report	Furlong 24'

Umpires:
Bruce Bale (ENG)
Nick Bennett (ENG)

=== Women's tournament ===
Roster

- Olivia Merry (co-c)
- Megan Hull (co-c)
- Kaitlin Cotter
- Anna Crowley
- Stephanie Dickins
- Katie Doar
- Alia Jaques
- Tyler Lench
- Alex Lukin
- Grace O'Hanlon
- Hope Ralph
- Brooke Roberts
- Olivia Shannon
- Rose Tynan
- Frances Davies
- Tarryn Davey
- Aniwaka Haumaha
- Tessa Jopp

Group play

Pos	Team	Pld	W	D	L	GF	GA	GD	Pts	Qualification
1	Australia	4	4	0	0	16	0	+16	12	Semi-finals
2	New Zealand	4	3	0	1	21	2	+19	9	Semi-finals
3	Scotland	4	2	0	2	15	5	+10	6	Fifth place match
4	South Africa	4	1	0	3	18	13	+5	3	Seventh place match
5	Kenya	4	0	0	4	0	50	−50	0	Ninth place match

Source: Birmingham 2022
Rules for classification: 1) points; 2) number of wins; 3) goal difference; 4) goals scored; 5) head-to-head results.

29 July 2022
09:00

New Zealand	16–0	Kenya
Jaques 8', 30+'; Dickins 12', 28'; Shannon 13', 29', 45+'; Hull 18', 30'; Lukin 25'; Davies 37'; Tynan 43'; Cotter 46', 50'; Merry 53', 56'	Report

Umpires:
Rachel Williams (ENG)
Lelia Sacre (CAN)

30 July 2022
21:00

New Zealand	1–0	Scotland
Tynan 9'	Report

Umpires:
Aleisha Neumann (AUS)
Rebecca Woodcock (ENG)

2 August 2022
09:00

New Zealand	0–1	Australia
	Report	Nobbs 9'

Umpires:
Rachel Williams (ENG)
Lelia Sacre (CAN)

4 August 2022
09:00

South Africa	1–4	New Zealand
Du Toit 50'	Report	Jopp 10'; Lench 11'; Ralph 12'; Cotter 49'

Umpires:
Rebecca Woodcock (ENG)
Lelia Sacre (CAN)

Semi-final

5 August 2022
18:00

England	0–0	New Zealand
	Report
Penalties
Howard (penalty shoot-out missed); Owsley (penalty shoot-out missed); Petter (penalty shoot-out scored); Martin (penalty shoot-out scored)	2–0	(penalty shoot-out missed) Ralph; (penalty shoot-out missed) Tynan; (penalty shoot-out missed) Doar; (penalty shoot-out missed) Shannon

Umpires:
Aleisha Neumann (AUS)
Wanri Venter (RSA)

Bronze medal match

7 August 2022
09:00

New Zealand	1–1	India
Merry 60'	Report	Salima 29'
Penalties
Hull (penalty shoot-out scored); Ralph (penalty shoot-out missed); Tynan (penalty shoot-out missed); Doar (penalty shoot-out missed); Shannon (penalty shoot-out missed)	1–2	(penalty shoot-out missed) Sangita; (penalty shoot-out scored) Sonika; (penalty shoot-out scored) Navneet; (penalty shoot-out missed) Neha

Umpires:
Rachel Williams (ENG)
Aleisha Neumann (AUS)

== Judo ==
A squad of seven judoka (three men, four women) was officially selected on 13 May 2022.

Athlete	Event	Round of 16	Quarterfinals	Semifinals	Repechage	Final / BM	Rank
Athlete	Event	Opposition Result	Opposition Result	Opposition Result	Opposition Result	Opposition Result	Rank
Elliott Connolly	Men's 81 kg	Pushpakumara (SRI); W IPP	Elnahas (CAN); L IPP	—N/a	Nikolic (AUS); L IPP	Did not advance	=7
Jason Koster	Men's 100 kg	Khan (PAK); W IPP	Reyes (CAN); L IPP	—N/a	Ozcicek-Takagi (AUS); L IPP	Did not advance	=7
Kody Andrews	Men's +100 kg	Bye	Dugasse (SEY); W IPP	Perrinne (MRI); W IPP	—N/a	Deschenes (CAN); L IPP	2nd place, silver medalist(s)
Qona Christie	Women's 57 kg	Bye	Legentil (MRI); L WAZ	—N/a	Wilson (SCO); L IPP	Did not advance	=7
Moira de Villiers	Women's 78 kg	—N/a	Mackey (NZL); W IPP	Reid (ENG); L WAZ	—N/a	Arrey Sophina (CMR); W IPP	3rd place, bronze medalist(s)
Hayley Mackey	Women's 78 kg	—N/a	De Villiers (NZL); L IPP	—N/a	Tytler (SCO); L IPP	Did not advance	=7
Sydnee Andrews	Women's +78 kg	Bye	Wood (TTO); W IPP	Maan (IND); L IPP	—N/a	Hawkes (NIR); W IPP	3rd place, bronze medalist(s)

== Lawn bowls ==
A squad of six parasport players (plus two directors) was officially selected on 15 March 2022.

Ten players were added to the squad on 22 June 2022. In addition, Deane Robertson was unable to satisfy international classification requirements and was replaced by Gerald Brouwers.

Men

Athlete	Event	Group stage					Quarterfinal	Semifinal	Final / BM	Rank
Athlete	Event	Opposition Score	Opposition Score	Opposition Score	Opposition Score	Rank	Opposition Score	Opposition Score	Opposition Score	Rank
Shannon McIlroy	Singles	Borgohain (IND); W 21–8	Davis (JEY); L 19–21	Locke (FLK); W 21–5	McLean (SCO); L 4–21	3	did not advance			10
Tony Grantham; Shannon McIlroy	Pairs	Niue; W 23–14	Canada; L 11–15	Jersey; D 15–15	Scotland; L 11–15	4	did not advance			13
Andrew Kelly; Mike Galloway; Ali Forsyth	Triples	India; W 23–6	Malta; L 12–22	Scotland; L 14–15	—N/a	3	did not advance			10
Tony Grantham; Andrew Kelly; Mike Galloway; Ali Forsyth	Fours	Jersey; W 22–9	South Africa; L 13–14	Malta; W 14–13	Scotland; L 10–18	2 Q	Wales; L 16–18	did not advance		8

Women

Athlete	Event	Group stage					Quarterfinal	Semifinal	Final / BM	Rank
Athlete	Event	Opposition Score	Opposition Score	Opposition Score	Opposition Score	Rank	Opposition Score	Opposition Score	Opposition Score	Rank
Katelyn Inch	Singles	Lim (SGP); W 21–17	Buckingham (NIU); W 21–10	Pharaoh (ENG); W 21–18	Ahmad (MAS); L 20–21	2 Q	Beere (GGY); L 16–21	did not advance		7
Selina Goddard; Katelyn Inch	Pairs	India; W 18–9	South Africa; W 19–10	Niue; W 19–16	—N/a	1 Q	Wales; W 16–15	England; L 12–19	Malaysia; W 20–15	3rd place, bronze medalist(s)
Nicole Toomey; Tayla Bruce; Val Smith	Triples	India; L 11–15	Niue; W 31–10	England; W 18–14	—N/a	2 Q	Australia; W 14–10	Malaysia; L 9–16	Cook Islands; W 27–6	3rd place, bronze medalist(s)
Nicole Toomey; Selina Goddard; Tayla Bruce; Val Smith	Fours	Wales; W 18–12	Niue; W 29–3	South Africa; D 14–14	—N/a	1 Q	Botswana; W 17–13	India; L 13–16	Fiji; W 17–6	3rd place, bronze medalist(s)

Parasport

Athlete	Event	Group stage						Semifinal	Final / BM	Rank
Athlete	Event	Opposition Score	Opposition Score	Opposition Score	Opposition Score	Opposition Score	Rank	Opposition Score	Opposition Score	Rank
Mark Noble; Graham Skellern	Men's pairs B6-8	Australia; L 7–17	England; L 11–19	Wales; W 20–12	South Africa; W 17–7	Scotland; L 5–25	4 Q	Scotland; L 10–18	England; L 4–13	4
Lynda Bennett; Pam Walker	Women's pairs B6-8	England; L 10–12	Scotland; L 12–15	Australia; L 8–19	South Africa; L 8–25	—N/a	5	did not advance		5
Sue Curran directed by Bronwyn Milne; Gerald Brouwers directed by Kevin Smith	Mixed pairs B2-3	Australia; L 9–25	Scotland; L 11–18	Wales; L 8–18	South Africa; L 8–22	England; W 19–8	6	did not advance		6

== Netball ==
By virtue of its position in the World Netball Rankings (as of 28 July 2021), New Zealand qualified for the tournament.

Partial fixtures were announced in November 2021, then updated with the remaining qualifiers in March 2022. The squad was announced on 27 June 2022.

Summary

Team	Event	Group stage						Semifinal	Final / BM	
Team	Event	Opposition Result	Opposition Result	Opposition Result	Opposition Result	Opposition Result	Rank	Opposition Result	Opposition Result	Rank
New Zealand women	Women's tournament	Northern Ireland; W 78–20	Uganda; W 53–40	Malawi; W 69–50	Trinidad and Tobago; W 80–24	England; L 44–54	2 Q	Jamaica; L 51–67	England; W 55–48	3rd place, bronze medalist(s)

Squad

- Maia Wilson
- Te Paea Selby-Rickit
- Grace Nweke
- Bailey Mes
- Gina Crampton (c)
- Shannon Saunders
- Whitney Souness
- Kate Heffernan
- Kayla Johnson
- Phoenix Karaka
- Kelly Jury
- Sulu Fitzpatrick (vc)

Group stage

Pos	Team	Pld	W	D	L	GF	GA	GD	Pts	Qualification
1	England (H)	5	5	0	0	321	169	+152	10	Semi-finals
2	New Zealand	5	4	0	1	325	188	+137	8	Semi-finals
3	Uganda	5	3	0	2	256	206	+50	6	Classification matches
4	Malawi	5	2	0	3	258	262	−4	4	Classification matches
5	Northern Ireland	5	1	0	4	155	299	−144	2	Classification matches
6	Trinidad and Tobago	5	0	0	5	136	327	−191	0	Classification matches

Source: Birmingham 2022
(H) Hosts

29 July 2022; 20:00	Report	New Zealand	79–20	Northern Ireland	National Exhibition Centre; Umpires: Anso Kemp; Joshua Bowring
29 July 2022; 20:00	Report	Mes 5/13 (38%); Nweke 29/31 (94%); Selby-Rickit 25/27 (93%); Wilson 20/22 (91%)		Bowman 4/7 (57%); Crosbie 9/16 (56%); Magee 6/10 (60%); McGrath 1/3 (33%)	National Exhibition Centre; Umpires: Anso Kemp; Joshua Bowring

30 July 2022; 20:00	Report	New Zealand	53–40	Uganda	National Exhibition Centre; Umpires: Gary Burgess; Bronwen Adams
30 July 2022; 20:00	Report	Nweke 32/37 (86%); Selby-Rickit 7/8 (88%); Wilson 14/15 (93%)		Cholhok 19/22 (86%); Eyaru 16/21 (76%); Proscovia 5/8 (63%)	National Exhibition Centre; Umpires: Gary Burgess; Bronwen Adams

1 August 2022; 20:00	Report	New Zealand	69–50	Malawi	National Exhibition Centre; Umpires: Gary Burgess; Joshua Bowring
1 August 2022; 20:00	Report	Nweke 52/55 (95%); Selby-Rickit 13/15 (87%); Wilson 4/5 (80%)		Chimaliro 5/6 (83%); Kumwenda 27/31 (87%); Mvula 14/17 (82%); Simtowe 4/4 (100%)	National Exhibition Centre; Umpires: Gary Burgess; Joshua Bowring

2 August 2022; 20:00	Report	New Zealand	80–24	Trinidad and Tobago	National Exhibition Centre; Umpires: Kate Wright; Elizna Van Den Berg
2 August 2022; 20:00	Report	Mes 8/10 (80%); Nweke 37/39 (95%); Selby-Rickit 19/22 (86%); Wilson 16/16 (100%)		Cooper 13/15 (87%); Noel 11/12 (92%)	National Exhibition Centre; Umpires: Kate Wright; Elizna Van Den Berg

4 August 2022; 21:00	Report	New Zealand	44–54	England	National Exhibition Centre; Umpires: Joshua Bowring; Bronwen Adams
4 August 2022; 21:00	Report	Nweke 23/29 (79%); Selby-Rickit 13/13 (100%); Wilson 8/9 (89%)		Cardwell 26/29 (90%); Harten 5/6 (83%); Housby 23/26 (88%)	National Exhibition Centre; Umpires: Joshua Bowring; Bronwen Adams

Semi-final

6 August 2022; 09:00	Report	Jamaica	67–51	New Zealand	National Exhibition Centre; Umpires: Joshua Bowring; Bronwen Adams
6 August 2022; 09:00	Report	Beckford 10/10 (100%); Fowler 54/54 (100%); Nelson 3/3 (100%)		Nweke 24/24 (100%); Selby-Rickit 14/16 (88%); Wilson 13/15 (87%)	National Exhibition Centre; Umpires: Joshua Bowring; Bronwen Adams

Bronze medal match

7 August 2022; 13:30	Report	New Zealand	55–48	England	National Exhibition Centre; Umpires: Joshua Bowring; Bronwen Adams
7 August 2022; 13:30	Report	Nweke 44/48 (92%); Selby-Rickit 11/14 (79%)		Cardwell 31/34 (91%); Harten 4/5 (80%); Housby 13/17 (76%)	National Exhibition Centre; Umpires: Joshua Bowring; Bronwen Adams

== Rugby sevens ==
New Zealand qualified for both the men's and women's tournaments. This was achieved through their positions in the 2018–19 / 2019–20 World Rugby Sevens Series and 2018–19 / 2019–20 World Rugby Women's Sevens Series respectively.

Both squads were announced on 29 June 2022.

Summary

Team	Event	Preliminary Round				Quarterfinal / CQ	Semifinal / CS	Final / BM / CF	
Team	Event	Opposition Result	Opposition Result	Opposition Result	Rank	Opposition Result	Opposition Result	Opposition Result	Rank
New Zealand men	Men's tournament	Sri Lanka; W 63–5	Samoa; W 19–17	England; W 20–0	1 Q	Kenya; W 31–0	Fiji; L 14–19	Australia; W 26–12	3rd place, bronze medalist(s)
New Zealand women	Women's tournament	Canada; W 45–7	Sri Lanka; W 60–0	England; W 38–7	1 Q	—N/a	Australia; L 12–17	Canada; W 19–12	3rd place, bronze medalist(s)

=== Men's tournament ===
Squad

- Leroy Carter
- Che Clark
- Dylan Collier (vc)
- Scott Curry
- Sam Dickson (c)
- Moses Leo
- Ngarohi McGarvey-Black
- Sione Molia
- Tone Ng Shiu
- Akuila Rokolisoa
- Caleb Tangitau
- Regan Ware
- Joe Webber (vc)

Pool A

Pos	Team	Pld	W	D	L	PF	PA	PD	Pts	Qualification
1	New Zealand	3	3	0	0	102	22	+80	9	Advance to Quarter-finals
2	Samoa	3	2	0	1	99	19	+80	7	Advance to Quarter-finals
3	England	3	1	0	2	47	77	−30	5	Advance to classification Quarter-finals
4	Sri Lanka	3	0	0	3	24	154	−130	3	Advance to classification Quarter-finals

Source: Birmingham2022
Rules for classification: 1) Points; 2) Head-to-head result; 3) Point difference; 4) Points scored.

29 July 2022
11:12

New Zealand	63–5	Sri Lanka
Try: Curry 1' c McGarvey-Black (2) 2' c, 8' c Molia (2) 4' c, 13' c Webber 5' c Collier 9' c Rokolisoa 10' c Tangitau 14' c Con: McGarvey-Black (5/5) 1', 2', 4', 6', 8'; Rokolisoa (4/4) 10', 11', 13', 14'	Report	Try: Ratwatte 6' m

Coventry Stadium, Coventry
Referee: Ben Breakspear (Wales)

29 July 2022
20:04

New Zealand	19–17	Samoa
Try: Dickson 7' c Webber 9' m Tangitau 12' c Con: McGarvey-Black (2/3) 7', 13'	Report	Try: Scanlan 1' c Niue 3' m Maliko 5' m Con: Matavao (1/3) 1'

Coventry Stadium, Coventry
Referee: Adam Leal (England)

30 July 2022
11:34

New Zealand	20–0	England
Try: Webber 6' m Tangitau 8' m Clark (2) 11' m, 14' m Con: Rokolisoa (0/2); McGarvey-Black (0/2)	Report

Coventry Stadium, Coventry
Referee: Morné Ferreira (South Africa)

Quarter-final

30 July 2022
21:10

New Zealand	31–0	Kenya
Try: McGarvey-Black 3' c Ware (2) 7' m, 8' c Curry 10' m Collier 12' c Con: McGarvey-Black (3/5) 4', 9', 13'	Report

Coventry Stadium, Coventry
Referee: Morné Ferreira (South Africa)

Semi-final

31 July 2022
12:42

New Zealand	14–19 (a.e.t.)	Fiji
Try: Ware 5' c Con: McGarvey-Black (1/1) 6'; Cards: Rokolisoa (yellow card) 14'; Carter (yellow card) 14'	Report	Try: Sauturaga 7' c Mocenacagi 10' c Nacuqu 15'; Con: Nacuqu (2/2) 7', 10'; Cards: Rasaku (yellow card) 3'

Coventry Stadium, Coventry
Referee: Jordan Way (Australia)

Bronze medal match

31 July 2022
20:12

New Zealand	26-12	Australia
Try: Carter (2) 0' c, 11' m Leo (2) 6' c, 9' c Con: McGarvey-Black (3/4) 1', 6', 9'	Report	Try: Turner 4' c Paterson 13' m Con: Roache (1/2) 4'

Coventry Stadium, Coventry
Referee: Ben Breakspear (Wales)

=== Women's tournament ===
Squad

- Michaela Blyde
- Kelly Brazier
- Theresa Fitzpatrick
- Sarah Hirini (c)
- Stacey Fluhler
- Jazmin Hotham
- Shiray Kaka
- Tyla Nathan-Wong
- Risi Pouri-Lane
- Alena Saili
- Niall Williams
- Tenika Willison
- Portia Woodman

Pool A

Pos	Team	Pld	W	D	L	PF	PA	PD	Pts	Qualification
1	New Zealand	3	3	0	0	143	14	+129	9	Semi-finals
2	Canada	3	2	0	1	107	64	+43	7	Semi-finals
3	England	3	1	0	2	83	64	+19	5	Classification semi-finals
4	Sri Lanka	3	0	0	3	0	191	−191	3	Classification semi-finals

Source: Birmingham2022
Rules for classification: 1) Points; 2) Head-to-head result; 3) Point difference; 4) Points scored.

29 July 2022
10:06

New Zealand	45–7	Canada
Try: Woodman 2' c Blyde (2) 4' m, 8' c Fluhler 7' m Brazier 11' c Pouri-Lane 12' c Saili 14' c Con: Nathan-Wong (2/4) 3', 8'; Pouri-Lane (3/3) 11', 13', 14'	Report	Try: Daniels 10' c Con: Apps (1/1) 10'; Cards: Gonzalez (yellow card) 2'

Coventry Stadium, Coventry
Referee: Tyler Miller (Australia)

29 July 2022
18:14

New Zealand	60–0	Sri Lanka
Try: Fluhler (2) 1' c, 3' c Blyde (6) 2' m, 5' m, 6' c, 7' m, 10' m, 13' m Hotham 8' c Nathan-Wong 9' c Con: Nathan-Wong (5/10) 1', 3', 6', 8', 9'	Report

Coventry Stadium, Coventry
Referee: Hollie Davidson (Scotland)

30 July 2022
10:06

New Zealand	38–7	England
Try: Blyde (2) 3' c, 6' c Hirini 4' c Kaka 10' m Hotham 12' c Pouri-Lane 14' m Con: Nathan-Wong (3/3) 3', 5', 7'; Pouri-Lane (1/3) 13'	Report	Try: Boatman 7' c Con: Norman-Bell (1/1) 7'

Coventry Stadium, Coventry
Referee: Hollie Davidson (Scotland)

Semi-final

30 July 2022
19:42

New Zealand	12–17	Australia
Try: Woodman 4' m Fitzpatrick 6' c Con: Nathan-Wong (1/2) 7'	Report	Try: Levi (3) 1' m, 9' m, 12' c Con: Williams (0/2); Du Toit (1/1) 12'; Cards: Levi (yellow card) 14'

Coventry Stadium, Coventry
Referee: Hollie Davidson (Scotland)

Bronze medal match

31 July 2022
19:50

New Zealand	19–12	Canada
Try: Blyde 1' m Brazier 4' c Saili 11' c Con: Nathan-Wong (1/2) 5'; Pouri-Lane (1/1) 11'	Report	Try: Logan 12' c Chown 14' m Con: Apps (1/2) 13'; Cards: Scurfield (yellow card) 1'

Coventry Stadium, Coventry
Referee: Tyler Miller (Australia)

== Squash ==
A squad of seven players (three men, four women) was officially selected on 31 May 2022.

Singles

Athlete	Event	Round of 64	Round of 32	Round of 16	Quarterfinals	Semifinals	Final / BM	Rank
Athlete	Event	Opposition Score	Opposition Score	Opposition Score	Opposition Score	Opposition Score	Opposition Score	Rank
Lwamba Chileshe	Men's singles	Siaguru (PNG); W 3–0	Sachvie (CAN); L 2–3	did not advance				=17
Temwa Chileshe	Men's singles	Snagg (SVG); W 3–0	Stewart (SCO); L 1–3	did not advance				=17
Paul Coll	Men's singles	Bye	Engerer (MLT); W 3–0	Evans (WAL); W 3–1	Waller (ENG); W 3–0	Ghosal (IND); W 3–0	Makin (WAL); W 3–2	1st place, gold medalist(s)
Joelle King	Women's singles	Bye	Katse (BOT); W 3–0	Adderley (SCO); W 3–0	Turmel (ENG); W 3–1	Naughton (CAN); L 1–3	Perry (ENG); L 2–3	4
Kaitlyn Watts	Women's singles	Bye	Fung-A-Fat (GUY); W 3–0	Chinappa (IND); L 1–3	did not advance			=9

Doubles

Athlete	Event	Round of 32	Round of 16	Quarterfinals	Semifinals	Final / BM	Rank
Athlete	Event	Opposition Score	Opposition Score	Opposition Score	Opposition Score	Opposition Score	Rank
Temwa Chileshe; Lwamba Chileshe	Men's doubles	Siaguru / Suari (PNG); W 2–0	Ng / Yuen (MAS); L 1–2	did not advance			=9
Kaitlyn Watts; Abbie Palmer	Women's doubles	Bye	Aitken / Adderley (SCO); L 0–2	did not advance			=9
Joelle King; Amanda Landers-Murphy	Women's doubles	Bye	Fung-a-Fat / Khalil (GUY); W 2–0	Kennedy / Turmel (ENG); W 2–0	Chan / Ampandi (MAS); W 2–0	Perry / Waters (ENG); W 2–0	1st place, gold medalist(s)
Joelle King; Paul Coll	Mixed doubles	Bye	Zafar / Iqbal (PAK); W 2–0	Stewart / Adderley (SCO); W 2–0	Pallikal Karthik / Ghosal (IND); W 2–0	Waters / Waller (ENG); W 2–0	1st place, gold medalist(s)

== Swimming ==
A squad of twelve swimmers (five men, seven women) was officially selected on 27 April 2022. The para swimmers qualified via the World Para Swimming World Rankings for performances registered between 31 December 2020 and 18 April 2022.

Athlete	Event	Heat		Semifinal		Final	
Athlete	Event	Time	Rank	Time	Rank	Time	Rank
Lewis Clareburt	Men's 200 m individual medley	2:01.12	6 Q	—N/a		1:57.59	3rd place, bronze medalist(s)
Lewis Clareburt	Men's 400 m individual medley	4:17.72	1 Q	—N/a		4:08.70 GR	1st place, gold medalist(s)
Lewis Clareburt	Men's 200 m butterfly	1:56.76	1 Q	—N/a		1:55.60	1st place, gold medalist(s)
Erika Fairweather	Women's 200 m freestyle	1:58.18	5 Q	—N/a		1:57.08	5
Erika Fairweather	Women's 400 m freestyle	4:07.27	1 Q	—N/a		4:03.84	4
Helena Gasson	Women's 50 m butterfly	26.52	2 Q	26.36	6 Q	26.24	7
Helena Gasson	Women's 100 m butterfly	59.37	11 Q	59.39	12	did not advance	
Helena Gasson	Women's 200 m individual medley	2:15.49	10	—N/a		did not advance	
Cameron Gray	Men's 50 m freestyle	23.00	15 Q	22.77	=14	did not advance	
Cameron Gray	Men's 100 m freestyle	50.21	=14 Q	49.89	12	did not advance	
Cameron Gray	Men's 200 m freestyle	1:50.35	20	—N/a		did not advance	
Cameron Gray	Men's 50 m backstroke	25.67	12 Q	25.76	13	did not advance	
Cameron Gray	Men's 50 m butterfly	24.02	14 Q	23.58	7 Q	23.27	3rd place, bronze medalist(s)
Andrew Jeffcoat	Men's 50 m backstroke	25.04	2 Q	24.82	2 Q	24.65	1st place, gold medalist(s)
Andrew Jeffcoat	Men's 100 m backstroke	54.79	6 Q	54.01	3 Q	54.13	4
Andrew Jeffcoat	Men's 200 m backstroke	2:03.57	11	—N/a		did not advance	
Tupou Neiufi	Women's 100 m freestyle S9	1:15.97	8 Q	—N/a		1:14.91	8
Tupou Neiufi	Women's 100 m backstroke S8	—N/a		—N/a		1:17.91	2nd place, silver medalist(s)
Hazel Ouwehand	Women's 50 m backstroke	29.05	9 Q	28.85	10	did not advance	
Hazel Ouwehand	Women's 100 m backstroke	1:03.86	14 Q	1:04.10	15	did not advance	
Hazel Ouwehand	Women's 50 m butterfly	27.38	15 Q	27.01	14	did not advance	
Hazel Ouwehand	Women's 100 m butterfly	1:01.03	18	did not advance			
Sophie Pascoe	Women's 100 m freestyle S9	1:03.38	1 Q	—N/a		1:02.95	1st place, gold medalist(s)
Mya Rasmussen	Women's 200 m breaststroke	2:33.62	10	—N/a		did not advance	
Mya Rasmussen	Women's 200 m individual medley	2:16.03	11	—N/a		did not advance	
Mya Rasmussen	Women's 400 m individual medley	4:43.87	6 Q	—N/a		4:41.81	7
Jesse Reynolds	Men's 100 m backstroke S9	—N/a		—N/a		1:03.65	2nd place, silver medalist(s)
Jesse Reynolds	Men's 100 m breaststroke SB8	—N/a		—N/a		1:20.93	4
Eve Thomas	Women's 200 m freestyle	2:00.27	10	—N/a		did not advance	
Eve Thomas	Women's 400 m freestyle	4:11.50	7 Q	—N/a		4:09.73	6
Eve Thomas	Women's 800 m freestyle	8:39.01	3 Q	—N/a		8:32.63	4
Joshua Willmer	Men's 100 m backstroke S9	—N/a		—N/a		1:15.80	7
Joshua Willmer	Men's 100 m breaststroke SB8	—N/a		—N/a		1:14.12	1st place, gold medalist(s)

== Triathlon ==
A squad of six triathletes (three per gender) was officially selected on 13 May 2022. Ainsley Thorpe withdrew from competition because of a COVID-19 infection.

Individual

Athlete	Event	Swim (750 m)	Trans 1	Bike (20 km)	Trans 2	Run (5 km)	Total	Rank
Dylan McCullough	Men's	8:44	0:51	26:15	0:19	15:26	51:35	7
Tayler Reid	Men's	8:34	0:57	25:59	0:18	15:57	51:45	8
Hayden Wilde	Men's	8:38	0:51	26:01	0:18	14:59	50:47	2nd place, silver medalist(s)
Nicole van der Kaay	Women's	9:40	1:04	29:12	0:20	17:08	57:24	9
Andrea Hansen	Women's	10:09	1:00	30:41	0:20	17:44	59:54	18

Mixed relay

Athlete	Event	Swim (300 m)	Trans 1	Bike (5 km)	Trans 2	Run (2 km)	Leg time	Total time	Rank
Hayden Wilde; Nicole van der Kaay; Dylan McCullough; Andrea Hansen	Mixed relay	3:35; 4:34; 4:03; 4:40	0:49; 0:58; 0:49; 0:55	6:37; 7:22; 6:50; 7:40	0:16; 0:20; 0:17; 0:19	6:30; 7:12; 6:34; 7:17	17:47; 20:26; 18:33; 20:51	1:17:37	4

== Weightlifting ==
A squad of seven weightlifters (four men, three women) was officially selected on 15 March 2022.

David Liti qualified by winning his category at the 2021 Commonwealth Weightlifting Championships in Tashkent, Uzbekistan. The other weightlifters qualified via the IWF Commonwealth Ranking List, which was finalised on 9 March 2022.

Athlete	Event	Snatch				Clean & jerk				Total	Rank
Athlete	Event	1	2	3	Result	1	2	3	Result	Total	Rank
Vester Villalon	Men's 73 kg	123	126	~~129~~	126	155	~~161~~	~~162~~	155	281	9
Cameron McTaggart	Men's 81 kg	135	138	~~141~~	138	165	~~170~~	~~170~~	165	303	6
Koale Junior Tasi Taala	Men's 109 kg	~~145~~	~~146~~	~~146~~	–	DNF					
David Liti	Men's +109 kg	166	170	~~174~~	170	218	224	~~232~~	224	394	2nd place, silver medalist(s)
Emma McIntyre	Women's 64 kg	81	84	~~88~~	84	100	103	~~106~~	103	187	5
Megan Signal	Women's 71 kg	~~88~~	88	~~92~~	88	108	~~111~~	~~112~~	108	196	6
Hayley Whiting	Women's 87 kg	93	~~97~~	~~98~~	93	~~116~~	116	~~121~~	116	209	5

== Wrestling ==
A squad of six wrestlers (four men, two women) was officially selected on 28 June 2022.

Athlete	Event	Round of 16	Quarterfinal	Semifinal	Repechage	Final / BM	
Athlete	Event	Opposition Result	Opposition Result	Opposition Result	Opposition Result	Opposition Result	Rank
Suraj Singh	Men's 57 kg	Bye	Ravi (IND); L 0–10	—N/a	Bye	Asad (PAK); L 0–11 (Note: Asad was subsequently disqualified for a doping violation, and Singh was upgraded to a bronze medal.)	3rd place, bronze medalist(s)
Brahm Richards	Men's 65 kg	Connelly (SCO); L 0–10	did not advance				11
Cole Hawkins	Men's 74 kg	Mahabila (KEN); W 8–3	Sesay (SLE); W 9–3	Tahir (PAK); L 0–11	—N/a	Phulka (CAN); L 1–11	=5
Matthew Oxenham	Men's 86 kg	Punia (IND); L 0–10	—N/a	—N/a	Kassegbama (SLE); W 3–1	Moore (CAN); L 0–10	=5
Tayla Ford	Women's 68 kg	Bye	Clossick (ENG); W 10–0	Morais (CAN); L 4–6	—N/a	Aza (MRI); W 4–0	3rd place, bronze medalist(s)
Michelle Montague	Women's 76 kg	—N/a	Sihag (IND); L 3–5	did not advance			7

== See also ==
- New Zealand at the 2022 Winter Olympics
- New Zealand at the 2022 Winter Paralympics
