= Namibia at the 2022 Commonwealth Games =

- Flag of Namibia
- CG code: NAM
- CGA: Namibia National Olympic Committee
- Website: olympic.org.na

in Birmingham, England 28 July 2022 – 8 August 2022
- Competitors: 32 (25 men and 7 women) in 7 sports
- Flag bearers: Ananias Shikongo; Christine Mboma
- Medals Ranked 39th: Gold 0 Silver 0 Bronze 4 Total 4

Commonwealth Games appearances (overview)
- 1994; 1998; 2002; 2006; 2010; 2014; 2018; 2022; 2026; 2030

Namibia competed at the 2022 Commonwealth Games in Birmingham, England between 28 July and 8 August 2022. It was Namibia's eighth appearance at the Games.

Ananias Shikongo and Christine Mboma were the country's flagbearers during the opening ceremony.

== Medalists ==
Medal	Name	Sport	Event	Date
Bronze	Helalia Johannes	Athletics	Women's marathon	30 July
Bronze	Alex Miller	Cycling	Men's cross-country	3 August
Bronze	Ananias Shikongo	Athletics	Men's 100 m T12	4 August
Bronze	Christine Mboma	Athletics	Women's 200 m	6 August

== Competitors ==
Namibia will send a delegation of fifty-five (including officials and other staff) to the Games.

The following is the list of number of competitors participating at the Games per sport/discipline.

Sport	Men	Women	Total
Athletics	10	3	13
Boxing	2	0	2
Cycling	6	2	8
Lawn bowls	2	0	2
Swimming	2	0	2
Triathlon	3	2	5
Wrestling	2	0	2
Total	25 (Note: Total adjusted as two competitors (Jean-Paul Burger and Drikus Coetzee) are competing in cycling and triathlon.)	7	32

== Athletics ==
A squad of twelve athletes and one guide were officially selected on 1 July 2022. The para athletes qualified via the World Para Athletics World Rankings (for performances registered between 31 December 2020 and 25 April 2022).

Men
Track and road events

Athlete	Event	Heat		Semifinal		Final	
Athlete	Event	Result	Rank	Result	Rank	Result	Rank
Gilbert Hainuca	100 m	10.31	3 q	10.29	6	did not advance	
Ananias Shikongo; Guide: Even Tjiviju	100 m (T12)	11.12	2 q	—N/a		10.95	3rd place, bronze medalist(s)
Bradley Murere	100 m (T47)	11.57	3 Q	—N/a		11.62	5
Mahhad Bock	400 m	46.71	4	did not advance			
Ivan Geldenhuys	400 m	46.51	4 q	46.68	4	did not advance	
Andre Retief	400 m	46.95	4	did not advance			
Daniel Paulus	5000 m	—N/a				13:53.12	14
Andre Retief	400 m hurdles	51.73	4	—N/a		did not advance	
Tomas Rainhold	Marathon	—N/a				2:24:30	13

Field events

Athlete	Event	Qualification		Final	
Athlete	Event	Distance	Rank	Distance	Rank
Ryan Williams	Discus throw	55.54	13	did not advance	

Women
Track and road events

Athlete	Event	Heat		Semifinal		Final	
Athlete	Event	Result	Rank	Result	Rank	Result	Rank
Christine Mboma	200 m	23.20	1 Q	22.93	1 Q	22.80	3rd place, bronze medalist(s)
Alina Armas	Marathon	—N/a				2:33:30	7
Helalia Johannes	Marathon	—N/a				2:28:39	(bronze)

== Boxing ==
Two boxers were officially selected on 1 July 2022.

Men

Athlete	Event	Round of 32	Round of 16	Quarterfinals	Semifinals	Final	
Athlete	Event	Opposition Result	Opposition Result	Opposition Result	Opposition Result	Opposition Result	Rank
Tryagain Ndevelo	Featherweight	Bye	Davule (FIJ); W RSC	Hussamuddin (IND); L 1 - 4	did not advance		
Jonas Jonas	Light welterweight	Caleb (NRU); W RSC	Williams (BAH); W 5 - 0	Lynch (SCO); L 0 - 5	did not advance		

== Cycling ==
Seven cyclists were officially selected on 1 July 2022.

=== Road ===
Men

Athlete	Event	Time	Rank
Jean-Paul Burger	Road race	DNF	
Dirk Coetzee	Road race	DNF	
Tristan de Lange	Road race	DNF	
Alex Miller	Road race	3:37:08	47
Xavier Papo	Road race	DNF	
Dirk Coetzee	Time trial	55:05.94	32

Women

Athlete	Event	Time	Rank
Anri Krugel	Road race	DNF	
Vera Looser	Road race	2:44:46	4
Anri Krugel	Time trial	49:46.28	29
Vera Looser	Time trial	45:18.14	22

=== Mountain Biking ===
Athlete	Event	Time	Rank
Hugo Hahn	Men’s cross-country	LAP	13
Alex Miller	Men’s cross-country	1:36:20	3rd place, bronze medalist(s)
Xavier Papo	Men’s cross-country	LAP	17

== Lawn bowls ==
Two bowlers were officially selected on 1 July 2022.

Athlete	Event	Group Stage					Quarterfinal	Semifinal	Final / BM	
Athlete	Event	Opposition Score	Opposition Score	Opposition Score	Opposition Score	Rank	Opposition Score	Opposition Score	Opposition Score	Rank
Carel Olivier	Men's Singles	Walker (ENG); L 12 - 21	Simpson (JAM); W 21 - 9	Naiseruvati (FIJ); W 21 - 15	Abd Muin (MAS); W 21 - 12	3	did not advance			
John-Pierre Fouche; Carel Olivier	Men's Pairs	Wales; L 14 - 16	Jamaica; W 33 - 4	Northern Ireland; L 6 - 27	Norfolk Island; W 19 - 3	3	did not advance			

== Swimming ==
As of 10 June 2022, two swimmers will take part in the competition.

Men

Athlete	Event	Heat		Semifinal		Final	
Athlete	Event	Time	Rank	Time	Rank	Time	Rank
Xander Skinner	100 m freestyle	50.40	17 R	50.06	15	did not advance	
Ronan Wantenaar	50 m breaststroke	28.27	14 Q	28.56	16	did not advance	
Ronan Wantenaar	100 m breaststroke	1:03.14	18	did not advance			

== Triathlon ==
As of 25 June 2022, five triathletes will take part in the competition.

Individual

Athlete	Event	Swim (750 m)	Trans 1	Bike (20 km)	Trans 2	Run (5 km)	Total	Rank
Divan Du Plooy	Men's	9:53	1:03	29:17	0:22	15:49	56:24	25
Anri Krugel	Women's	11:51	1:08	32:23	0:25	20:09	1:05:56	23
Imke Jagau	Women's	12:16	1:09	32:17	0:20	20:10	1:06:12	24

Mixed relay

Athletes	Event	Total Times per Athlete (Swim 300 m, Bike 5 km, Run 2 km)	Total Group Time	Rank
Dirkus Coetzee; Imke Jagau; Jean-Paul Burger; Anri Krugel	Mixed relay	20:44; 24:02; 20:57; 24:41	1:30:24	9

== Wrestling ==
Two wrestlers were officially selected on 1 July 2022.

Key:

- VT - Victory by Fall.
- PP - Decision by Points - the loser with technical points.
- PO - Decision by Points - the loser without technical points.

Athlete	Event	Round of 16	Quarterfinal	Semifinal	Repechage	Final / BM	
Athlete	Event	Opposition Result	Opposition Result	Opposition Result	Opposition Result	Opposition Result	Rank
Romio Goliath	Men's -57 kg	Bye	Asad (PAK); L 0 - 10	did not advance			10
Jason Afrikaner	Men's -65 kg	Bye	Ramm (ENG); L 0 - 3	did not advance			10
