= Sam Gaze =

New Zealand mountain bike racer

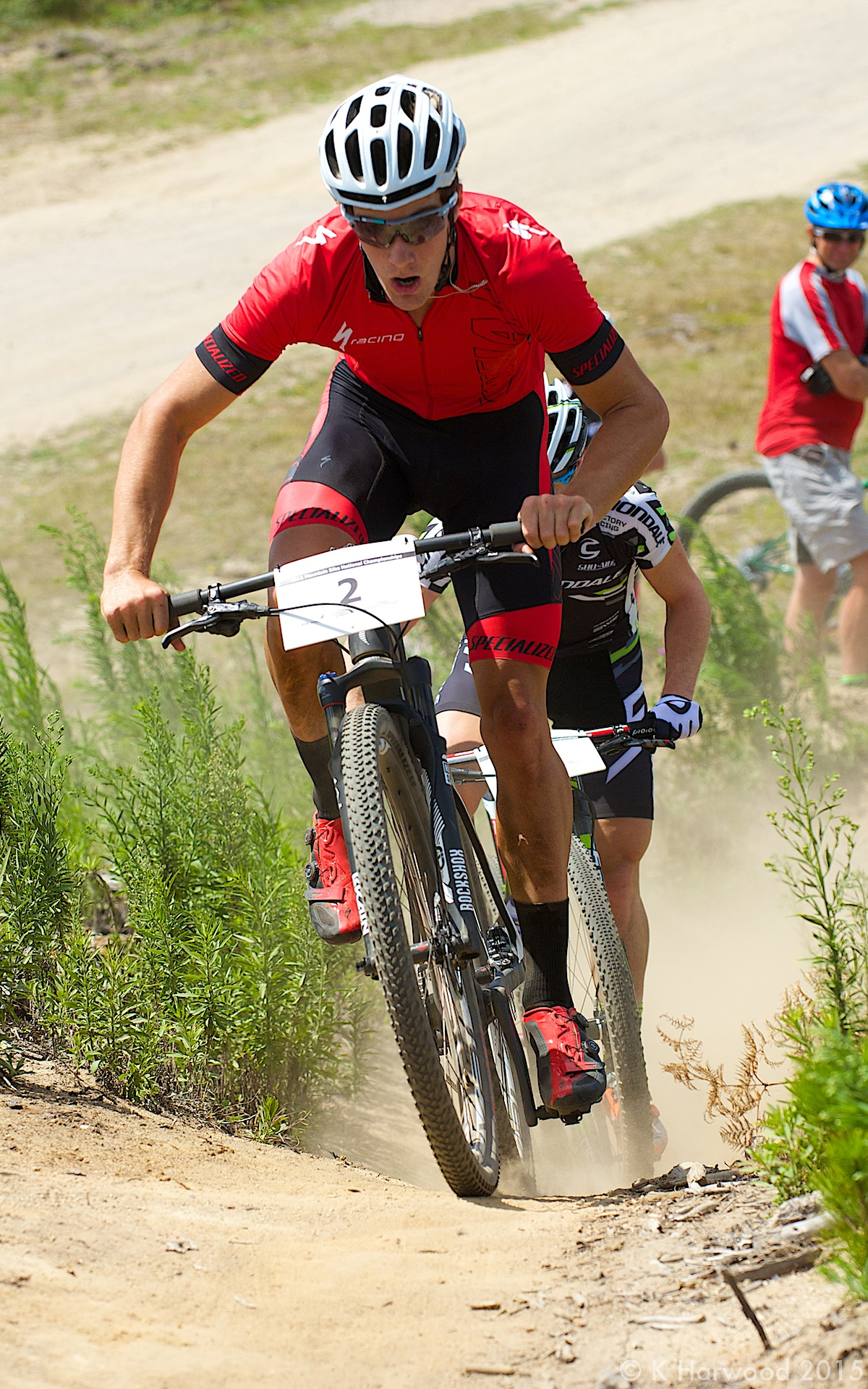
- Gaze at the National Championships in 2015 in Rotorua

Personal information
- Full name: Samuel William Gaze
- Born: 12 December 1995 (age 30) Tokoroa, New Zealand
- Height: 1.89 m (6 ft 2 in)
- Weight: 78 kg (172 lb)

Cycling career
- Sport: Cycling
- Current team: Alpecin–Premier Tech
- Disciplines: Mountain biking; Road
- Role: Rider
- Rider type: Cross-country

Professional teams
- 2015–2019: Specialized Racing (MTB)
- 2019: Deceuninck–Quick-Step (road; stagiaire)
- 2020: Alpecin–Fenix
- 2021: Alpecin–Fenix Development Team
- 2022–: Alpecin–Deceuninck

Major wins
- Mountain bike World Marathon Championships (2022) XC World Cup 1 individual win (2018)
Medal record
Men's cycle racing
Representing New Zealand
World Championships
Gold medal – first place	2023 Glasgow	Short track cross country
Gold medal – first place	2022 Haderslev	Mountain bike marathon
Gold medal – first place	2022 Les Gets	Short track cross-country
Gold medal – first place	2017 Cairns	Under 23 cross-country
Gold medal – first place	2016 Nové Město	Under 23 cross-country
Silver medal – second place	2023 Glasgow	Cross country olympic
Silver medal – second place	2015 Vallnord	Cross-country eliminator
Commonwealth Games
Gold medal – first place	2018 Gold Coast	Cross-country
Gold medal – first place	2022 Birmingham	Cross-country
Silver medal – second place	2014 Glasgow	Cross-country

Samuel William Gaze (born 12 December 1995) is a New Zealand cross-country and road cyclist, who currently rides for UCI WorldTeam Alpecin–Premier Tech. He won the under-23 Cross-Country at the 2016 UCI Mountain Bike & Trials World Championships and the 2017 UCI Mountain Bike World Championships. He also competes on occasion in road racing events, winning the National Criterium Championships in 2017 and 2018.

== Career ==
At the Men's cross-country event at the 2014 Commonwealth Games, Gaze won the silver medal behind fellow New Zealand rider Anton Cooper. Gaze was selected ahead of Cooper, who had medical conditions during 2016, to represent New Zealand at the 2016 Summer Olympics. He had two punctures in the Olympic race and his gears failed, and he pulled out when he got lapped.

In March 2018, Gaze became the first New Zealander to win an elite UCI Mountain Bike World Cup title, when he claimed the cross country event in the first round of the season in Stellenbosch, South Africa. In April 2018, Gaze won the gold medal in the cross country event at the 2018 Commonwealth Games. Despite his win, Gaze came under significant media attention for his perceived unsportsmanlike behaviour towards his compatriot and silver place winner Cooper. Gaze was fined CHF200 by the International Cycling Union for showing Cooper the finger during the race.

In August 2019, Gaze joined UCI WorldTeam Deceuninck–Quick-Step as a stagiaire for the second half of the season. For 2020, Gaze joined the Alpecin–Fenix team to contest road and mountain biking events.

== Personal life ==
Of Māori descent, Gaze affiliates to the Te Āti Awa iwi.

== Major results ==
=== Mountain bike ===
2014
2nd Cross-country, Commonwealth Games
2015
2nd Eliminator, UCI Urban World Championships
2016
1st Cross-country, National Championships
1st Cross-country, UCI World Under-23 Championships
UCI Under-23 XCO World Cup

1st Cairns
1st Albstadt
3rd La Bresse
3rd Lenzerheide

2017
1st Cross-country, UCI World Under-23 Championships
2018
1st Cross-country, Commonwealth Games
UCI XCO World Cup

1st Stellenbosch

UCI XCC World Cup

1st Nové Město
1st Mont-Sainte-Anne
2nd Albstadt

Copa Catalana Internacional

1st Girona

2nd Cross-country, Oceania Championships
2021
Swiss Bike Cup

1st Basel

Copa Catalana Internacional

1st Girona

1st Sittard
2022
UCI World Championships

1st Marathon
1st Short track

1st Cross-country, Commonwealth Games
UCI XCC World Cup

1st Albstadt

1st Wijster
Copa Catalana Internacional

2nd Vallnord

2023
UCI World Championships

1st Short track
2nd Cross-country

XCO French Cup

1st Guéret
2nd Marseille–Luminy

Shimano Super Cup

1st La Nucia

XCC French Cup

1st Guéret

UCI XCC World Cup

2nd Nové Město

2024
UCI XCC World Cup

1st Mairiporã
1st Val di Sole
3rd Les Gets

=== Road ===
2017
1st National Criterium Championships
4th Time trial, National Under-23 Championships
2018
1st National Criterium Championships
10th Road race, Commonwealth Games

==== Grand Tour general classification results timeline ====
Grand Tour	2023
Giro d'Italia	—
Tour de France	—
Vuelta a España	DNF
