= Cycling at the 2022 Commonwealth Games – Men's individual pursuit =

Men's Individual Pursuit competition

Cycling Track – Men's individual pursuit at the 2022 Commonwealth Games
- Venue: Lee Valley VeloPark
- Dates: 30 July
- Competitors: 19 from 8 nations
- Winning time: 4:07.760

Medalists
| gold medal | Aaron Gate | New Zealand |
| silver medal | Thomas Sexton | New Zealand |
| bronze medal | Conor Leahy | Australia |

The men's individual pursuit at the 2022 Commonwealth Games was part of the cycling programme, which took place on 30 July 2022, at the Lee Valley VeloPark, Stratford, London, England.

== Records ==
Prior to this competition, the existing world and Games records were as follows:

| World record | Ashton Lambie (USA) | 3:59.930 | Aguascalientes, Mexico | 18 August 2021 |
| Games record | Charlie Tanfield (ENG) | 4:11.455 | Brisbane, Australia | 6 April 2018 |

== Schedule ==
The schedule is as follows:

All times are British Summer Time (UTC+1)

| Date | Time | Round |
|---|---|---|
| Saturday 30 July 2022 | 12:22 | Qualifying |
| Saturday 30 July 2022 | 17:26 / 17:34 | Finals |

== Results ==
=== Qualifying ===
The two fastest riders advanced to the gold medal final. The next two fastest riders advanced to the bronze medal final.

| Rank | Riders | Time | Behind | Notes |
|---|---|---|---|---|
| 1 | Aaron Gate (NZL) | 4:07.129 | — | QG, GR |
| 2 | Thomas Sexton (NZL) | 4:08.689 | +1.560 | QG |
| 3 | Conor Leahy (AUS) | 4:09.023 | +1.894 | QB |
| 4 | Charlie Tanfield (ENG) | 4:09.776 | +2.647 | QB |
| 5 | Kyle Gordon (SCO) | 4:10.592 | +3.463 | |
| 6 | Daniel Bigham (ENG) | 4:11.078 | +3.949 | |
| 7 | John Archibald (SCO) | 4:12.541 | +5.412 | |
| 8 | Luke Plapp (AUS) | 4:14.015 | +6.886 | |
| 9 | James Moriarty (AUS) | 4:14.023 | +6.894 | |
| 10 | William Perrett (ENG) | 4:14.393 | +7.264 | |
| 11 | William Roberts (WAL) | 4:16.036 | +8.907 | |
| 12 | Joshua Tarling (WAL) | 4:16.873 | +9.744 | |
| 13 | Michael Foley (CAN) | 4:18.259 | +11.130 | |
| 14 | Mathias Guillemette (CAN) | 4:20.927 | +13.798 | |
| 15 | Jonny Wale (SCO) | 4:23.353 | +16.224 | |
| 16 | Riley Pickrell (CAN) | 4:26.385 | +19.256 | |
| 17 | Rhys Pilley (JEY) | 4:34.787 | +27.658 | |
| 18 | Vishavjeet Singh (IND) | 4:36.709 | +29.580 | |
| 19 | Dinesh Kumar (IND) | 4:37.066 | +29.937 | |

=== Finals ===
| Rank | Riders | Time | Gap | Notes |
|---|---|---|---|---|
Gold medal final
| 1st place, gold medalist(s) | Aaron Gate (NZL) | 4:07.760 | | |
| 2nd place, silver medalist(s) | Thomas Sexton (NZL) | 4:12.179 | +4.419 | |
Bronze medal final
| 3rd place, bronze medalist(s) | Conor Leahy (AUS) | 4:09.311 | | |
| 4 | Charlie Tanfield (ENG) | 4:10.423 | +1.112 | |
