= Cycling at the 2022 Commonwealth Games – Men's road race =

Men's road race at the 2022 Commonwealth Games
- Venue: Myton Fields
- Dates: 7 August
- Competitors: 122 from 37 nations
- Winning time: 3:28:29

Medalists
gold medal	Aaron Gate	New Zealand
silver medal	Daryl Impey	South Africa
bronze medal	Finn Crockett	Scotland

The men's road race at the 2022 Commonwealth Games in Birmingham, England was held on 7 August.

== Schedule ==
The schedule was as follows:

Date	Time	Round
Sunday 7 August 2022	12:30	Race

All times are British Summer Time (UTC+1)

== Results ==
The results were as follows:

Rank	Name	Time	Behind
1st place, gold medalist(s)	Aaron Gate (NZL)	3:28:29	–
2nd place, silver medalist(s)	Daryl Impey (RSA)	s.t.	+0
3rd place, bronze medalist(s)	Finn Crockett (SCO)	s.t.	"
4	Matthew Teggart (NIR)	s.t.	"
5	Fred Wright (ENG)	s.t.	"
6	Luke Plapp (AUS)	3:28:32	+3
7	Ben Turner (ENG)	3:28:47	+18
8	Geraint Thomas (WAL)	3:28:51	+22
9	Sam Culverwell (GGY)	3:28:53	+24
10	Sean Flynn (SCO)	s.t.	"
11	Sam Watson (ENG)	3:28:55	+26
12	Morné van Niekerk (RSA)	s.t.	"
13	Pier-André Côté (CAN)	3:31:50	+3:21
14	Kaden Hopkins (BER)	3:32:23	+3:54
15	Ben Swift (IOM)	s.t.	"
16	Miles Scotson (AUS)	3:36:46	+8:17
17	Jack Bauer (NZL)	s.t.	"
18	Mark Stewart (SCO)	s.t.	"
19	Alexandre Mayer (MRI)	3:37:00	+8:31
20	Ethan Vernon (ENG)	3:37:08	+8:39
21	Red Walters (GRN)	s.t.	"
22	Patrick Bevin (NZL)	s.t.	"
23	Byiza Uhiriwe (RWA)	s.t.	"
24	Alexandros Agrotis (CYP)	s.t.	"
25	William Roberts (WAL)	s.t.	"
26	John Archibald (SCO)	s.t.	"
27	Oscar Quiroz (BIZ)	s.t.	"
28	Rhys Hidrio (JEY)	s.t.	"
29	Riley Pickrell (CAN)	s.t.	"
30	Shane Archbold (NZL)	s.t.	"
31	Conor White (BER)	s.t.	"
32	Aurélien de Comarmond (MRI)	s.t.	"
33	Eric Muhoza (RWA)	s.t.	"
34	Yannick Lincoln (MRI)	s.t.	"
35	Darren Rafferty (NIR)	s.t.	"
36	Moise Mugisha (RWA)	s.t.	"
37	Callum Ormiston (RSA)	s.t.	"
38	Thomas Mazzone (IOM)	s.t.	"
39	Christopher McGlinchey (NIR)	s.t.	"
40	James Roe (GGY)	s.t.	"
41	Dean Robson (JEY)	s.t.	"
42	Mark Christian (IOM)	s.t.	"
43	Michael Serafin (GGY)	s.t.	"
44	Mark Cavendish (IOM)	s.t.	"
45	Charlie Aldridge (SCO)	s.t.	"
46	Luke Durbridge (AUS)	s.t.	"
47	Alexander Miller (NAM)	s.t.	"
48	Sam Fox (AUS)	s.t.	"
49	Connor Swift (ENG)	s.t.	"
50	Cory Williams (BIZ)	s.t.	"
51	Luke Rowe (WAL)	s.t.	"
52	Cameron Orr (NIR)	s.t.	"
53	Dion Smith (NZL)	s.t.	"
54	Eric Manizabayo (RWA)	3:37:15	+8:46
55	Michael Foley (CAN)	3:37:16	+8:47
56	Marc Cox (GGY)	3:37:18	+8:49
57	Mathias Guillemette (CAN)	3:37:20	+8:51
58	Owain Doull (WAL)	s.t.	"
59	Campbell Stewart (NZL)	s.t.	"
60	Aidan Buttigieg (MLT)	s.t.	"
61	Carson Miles (CAN)	s.t.	"
62	Jake Stewart (ENG)	3:37:50	+9:21
63	Samuel Brand (IOM)	3:38:11	+9:42
64	Nicholas Narraway (BER)	s.t.	"
65	Joe Holt (WAL)	s.t.	"
66	Gustav Basson (RSA)	s.t.	"
67	Charles Kagimu (UGA)	s.t.	"
68	Christopher Rougier-Lagane (MRI)	s.t.	"
69	Mark Lett (GIB)	3:39:10	+10:41
70	Hasani Hennis (AIA)	s.t.	"
71	Andreas Miltiadis (CYP)	3:42:43	+14:14
72	Zack Hamon (JEY)	3:43:19	+14:50
73	Gregory Mayer (MRI)	3:47:08	+18:39
	Jack Rebours (JEY)	DNF	
	Stephen Williams (WAL)	DNF	
	Matthew Bostock (IOM)	DNF	
	Tristan de Lange (NAM)	DNF	
	Samuel Mugisha (RWA)	DNF	
	Dirk Coetzee (NAM)	DNF	
	Michael Testori (CAY)	DNF	
	Juan Guzman (GIB)	DNF	
	Kohath Baron (DMA)	DNF	
	Xavier Papo (NAM)	DNF	
	Kabelo Makatile (LES)	DNF	
	Samuel O'Shea (GIB)	DNF	
	Sebastian Tremlett (GGY)	DNF	
	Gontse Lethokwe (BOT)	DNF	
	Teboho Khantsi (LES)	DNF	
	Byron Pope (BIZ)	DNF	
	Christopher Griffith (GUY)	DNF	
	Sam Talbot (IVB)	DNF	
	Mario Ernesta (SEY)	DNF	
	John Pratts (GIB)	DNF	
	Trevor Bailey (SVG)	DNF	
	Nathaniel Forbes (CAY)	DNF	
	Yohan Monthy (SEY)	DNF	
	Jyme Bridges (ANT)	DNF	
	Emmanuel Arthur (GHA)	DNF	
	Darel Christopher (IVB)	DNF	
	Abdul Rahman Abdul Samed (GHA)	DNF	
	Obert Chembe (ZAM)	DNF	
	Danny Laud (AIA)	DNF	
	Zambezi Richardson (AIA)	DNF	
	Matlhogonolo Botlhole (BOT)	DNF	
	Rhys Pilley (JEY)	DNF	
	Muzi Shabangu (SWZ)	DNF	
	Derek Barbara (GIB)	DNF	
	Kwanele Jele (SWZ)	DNF	
	Kevon Boyd (DMA)	DNF	
	Davies Kawemba (ZAM)	DNF	
	Victor Magalhães (CAY)	DNF	
	Jim Horton (FLK)	DNF	
	Delroy Carty (AIA)	DNF	
	Henry Djangmah (GHA)	DNF	
	Stephen Belle (SEY)	DNF	
	Giovanni Lovell (BIZ)	DNF	
	Felix Neely (BAH)	DNF	
	Lorin Sawyer (BAH)	DNF	
	Anthony Boakye (GHA)	DNF	
	Jean-Paul Burger (NAM)	DNF	
	Sean Rodgers (TCA)	DNF	
	De'vaughn Williams (TCA)	DNF	
	Rohan Dennis (AUS)	DNS	
	Justin Williams (BIZ)	DNS	
