= Lawn bowls at the 2022 Commonwealth Games – Men's pairs B6–8 =

Bowls event

Lawn bowls men's pairs B6–8 at the 2022 Commonwealth Games
- Venue: Victoria Park
- Dates: 29 July – 2 August 2022
- Competitors: 12 from 6 nations

Medalists
gold medal	Garry Brown; Kevin Wallace	Scotland
silver medal	Damien Delgado; Chris Flavel	Australia
bronze medal	Craig Bowler; Kieran Rollings	England

Lawn bowls Men's pairs B6–8 at the 2022 Commonwealth Games was held at the Victoria Park from July 29 to August 2. A total of 12 athletes from 6 associations participated in the event. Garry Brown and Kevin Wallace of Scotland won the gold medal, defeating Damien Delgado and Chris Flavel from Australia in the final. England's Craig Bowler and Kieran Rollings won the bronze medal.

== Sectional play ==
The top four advance to the knockout stage.

Rank	Nation	Athletes	MP	MW	MT	ML	FR	AG	PD	PTS
1	Scotland	Garry Brown, Kevin Wallace	5	4	0	1	100	57	+43	12
2	England	Craig Bowler, Kieran Rollings	5	4	0	1	72	70	+2	12
3	Australia	Damien Delgado, Chris Flavel	5	3	1	1	77	58	+19	10
4	New Zealand	Graham Skellern, Mark Noble	5	2	0	3	60	80	–20	6
5	Wales	Christopher Spriggs, Paul Brown	5	1	0	4	57	75	–18	3
6	South Africa	Deon van de Vyver, Willem Viljoen	5	0	1	4	51	77	–26	1

	Australia	England	New Zealand	South Africa	Scotland	Wales
Australia	—	12–13	17–7	12–12	21–15	15–11
England	13–12	—	19–11	16–13	12–23	12–11
New Zealand	7–17	11–19	—	17–7	5–25	20–12
South Africa	12–12	13–16	7–17	—	10–18	9–14
Scotland	15–21	23–12	25–5	18–10	—	19–9
Wales	11–15	11–12	12–20	14–9	9–19	—

== Knockout stage ==
Semifinal
A1	Scotland	18
A4	New Zealand	10
A2	England	4
A3	Australia	17

Final
A1	Scotland	16
A3	Australia	7
Bronze medal
A4	New Zealand	4
A2	England	13
