= Cycling at the 2022 Commonwealth Games – Women's scratch race =

Cycling Track – Women's scratch race at the 2022 Commonwealth Games
- Venue: Lee Valley VeloPark
- Dates: 1 August 2022
- Competitors: 20 from 10 nations

Medalists
gold medal	Laura Kenny	England
silver medal	Michaela Drummond	New Zealand
bronze medal	Maggie Coles-Lyster	Canada

The women's scratch race at the 2022 Commonwealth Games, as part of the cycling programme, took place on 1 August 2022.

== Schedule ==
The schedule was as follows:

All times are British Summer Time (UTC+1)

Date	Time	Round
Monday 1 August 2022	16:28	Final

== Results ==
=== Final ===
40 laps (10 km) were raced.

Rank	Rider	Laps down
1st place, gold medalist(s)	Laura Kenny (ENG)	
2nd place, silver medalist(s)	Michaela Drummond (NZL)	
3rd place, bronze medalist(s)	Maggie Coles-Lyster (CAN)	
4	Neah Evans (SCO)	
5	Alice Sharpe (NIR)	
6	Chloe Moran (AUS)	
7	Ella Barnwell (WAL)	
8	Anna Morris (WAL)	
9	Amber Joseph (BAR)	
10	Ariane Bonhomme (CAN)	
11	Devaney Collier (CAN)	
12	Megan Barker (WAL)	
13	Sophie Lewis (ENG)	
14	Grace Lister (ENG)	
15	Alexi Costa-Ramirez (TTO)	
16	Emily Shearman (NZL)	
17	Sophie Edwards (AUS)	
18	Alyssa Polites (AUS)	
	Meenakshi Meenakshi (IND)	DNF
	Bryony Botha (NZL)	DNF
