= Cycling at the 2022 Commonwealth Games – Men's team pursuit =

Cycling Track – Men's team pursuit at the 2022 Commonwealth Games
- Venue: Lee Valley VeloPark
- Dates: 29 July
- Competitors: 25 from 6 nations
- Winning time: 3:47.575

Medalists
gold medal	Aaron Gate; Jordan Kerby; Tom Sexton; Campbell Stewart	New Zealand
silver medal	Daniel Bigham; Charlie Tanfield; Ethan Vernon; Oliver Wood	England
bronze medal	Joshua Duffy; Graeme Frislie; Connor Leahy; Lucas Plapp; James Moriarty	Australia

The men's team pursuit at the 2022 Commonwealth Games was part of the cycling programme, and took place on 29 July 2022.

== Records ==
Prior to this competition, the existing world and Games records were as follows:

World record	Italy (Simone Consonni, Filippo Ganna, Francesco Lamon, Jonathan Milan)	3:42.032	Izu, Japan	4 August 2021
Games record	Australia (Leigh Howard, Jordan Kerby, Kelland O'Brien, Alex Porter)	3:49.804	Brisbane, Australia	5 April 2018

== Schedule ==
The schedule is as follows:

All times are British Summer Time (UTC+1)

Date	Time	Round
Friday 29 July 2022	10:55	Qualifying
Friday 29 July 2022	17:20	Finals

== Results ==
=== Qualifying ===
The two fastest teams advanced to the gold medal final. The next two fastest teams advanced to the bronze medal final.

Rank	Nation	Time	Behind	Notes
1	New Zealand; Aaron Gate; Jordan Kerby; Tom Sexton; Campbell Stewart	3:49.821		QG
2	England; Daniel Bigham; Charlie Tanfield; Ethan Vernon; Oliver Wood	3:50.796	+0.975	QG
3	Australia; Joshua Duffy; Connor Leahy; James Moriarty; Lucas Plapp	3:51.274	+1.453	QB
4	Wales; Rhys Britton; Joe Holt; Will Roberts; Joshua Tarling	3:54.613	+4.792	QB
5	Canada; Michael Foley; Derek Gee; Mathias Guillemette; Riley Pickrell	4:03.618	+13.797	
6	India; Venkappa Kengalagutti; Dinesh Kumar; Anantha Narayanan; Vishavjeet Singh	4:12.865	+23.044	

=== Finals ===
Rank	Nation	Time	Behind	Notes
Gold medal final
1st place, gold medalist(s)	New Zealand; Aaron Gate; Jordan Kerby; Tom Sexton; Campbell Stewart	3:47.575		GR
2nd place, silver medalist(s)	England; Daniel Bigham; Charlie Tanfield; Ethan Vernon; Oliver Wood	3:49.584	+2.009	
Bronze medal final
3rd place, bronze medalist(s)	Australia; Joshua Duffy; Graeme Frislie; Connor Leahy; James Moriarty; Lucas Plapp	3:50.403		
4	Wales; Rhys Britton; Joe Holt; Will Roberts; Joshua Tarling	3:53.525	+3.122	
