= Cycling at the 2022 Commonwealth Games – Women's road time trial =

Cycling – Women's road time trial at the 2022 Commonwealth Games
- Venue: West Park
- Dates: 4 August
- Competitors: 32 from 16 nations
- Winning time: 40:05.20

Medalists
gold medal	Grace Brown	Australia
silver medal	Anna Henderson	England
bronze medal	Georgia Williams	New Zealand

The women's road time trial at the 2022 Commonwealth Games in Birmingham, England was held on 4 August along the West Park.

== Schedule ==
The schedule was as follows:

Date	Time	Round
Thursday 4 August 2022	10:00	Race

All times are British Summer Time (UTC+1)

== Results ==
The results were as follows:

Rank	Name	Time	Behind
1st place, gold medalist(s)	Grace Brown (AUS)	40:05.20	–
2nd place, silver medalist(s)	Anna Henderson (ENG)	40:38.55	+33.35
3rd place, bronze medalist(s)	Georgia Williams (NZL)	41:25.27	+1:20.07
4	Georgia Baker (AUS)	41:44.85	+1:39.65
5	Lizzie Holden (IOM)	41:48.78	+1:43.58
6	Rebecca Storrie (IOM)	41:53.49	+1:48.29
7	Teniel Campbell (TTO)	42:07.99	+2:02.79
8	Elynor Bäckstedt (WAL)	42:15.16	+2:09.96
9	Sarah Roy (AUS)	42:26.44	+2:21.24
10	Anna Shackley (SCO)	42:48.77	+2:43.57
11	Alison Jackson (CAN)	42:53.07	+2:47.87
12	Joss Lowden (ENG)	42:54.91	+2:49.71
13	Leah Kirchmann (CAN)	42:55.62	+2:50.42
14	Simone Boilard (CAN)	43:08.73	+3:03.53
15	Leah Dixon (WAL)	43:16.80	+3:11.60
16	Anna Morris (WAL)	43:22.08	+3:16.88
17	Neah Evans (SCO)	43:45.34	+3:40.14
18	Abi Smith (ENG)	44:03.23	+3:58.03
19	Jo Patterson (NIR)	44:42.75	+4:37.55
20	Mikayla Harvey (NZL)	44:55.84	+4:50.64
21	Antri Christoforou (CYP)	45:08.55	+5:03.35
22	Vera Looser (NAM)	45:18.14	+5:12.94
23	Aurelie Halbwachs (MRI)	46:38.29	+6:33.09
24	Jessica Carridge (IOM)	46:42.04	+6:36.84
25	Diane Ingabire (RWA)	47:39.04	+7:33.84
26	Jacqueline Tuyishime (RWA)	48:04.33	+7:59.13
27	Elaine Pratts (GIB)	48:14.65	+8:09.45
28	Olivia Lett (GIB)	48:53.14	+8:47.94
29	Anri Krugel (NAM)	49:46.28	+9:41.08
30	Alicia Thompson (BIZ)	55:07.72	+15:02.52
31	Sarah Nanyanzi (UGA)	1:04:35.27	+24:30.07
	Ashleigh Moolman (RSA)	Did not start	
	Kerry Jonker (RSA)	Did not start	
	Hayley Preen (RSA)	Did not start	
	Caitlin Conyers (BER)	Did not start	
	Henrietta Christie (NZL)	Did not start	
