= Cycling at the 2022 Commonwealth Games – Men's cross-country =

Cycling – Men's cross-country at the 2022 Commonwealth Games
- Venue: Cannock Chase Forest
- Dates: 3 August
- Competitors: 26 from 15 nations

Medalists
gold medal	Sam Gaze	New Zealand
silver medal	Ben Oliver	New Zealand
bronze medal	Alex Miller	Namibia

The men's cross country mountain biking competition at the 2022 Commonwealth Games in Birmingham, England will be held on 3 August in the Cannock Chase Forest.

== Schedule ==
The schedule is as follows:

Date	Time	Round
Wednesday 3 August 2022	11:30	Race

All times are British Summer Time (UTC+1).

== Results ==
The results were as follows:

Rank	Name	Time	Behind
1st place, gold medalist(s)	Sam Gaze (NZL)	1:34:19	—
2nd place, silver medalist(s)	Ben Oliver (NZL)	1:34:50	+0:31
3rd place, bronze medalist(s)	Alex Miller (NAM)	1:36:20	+2:01
4	Cameron Orr (NIR)	1:36:29	+2:10
5	Joseph Blackmore (ENG)	1:36:29	+2:10
6	Sam Fox (AUS)	1:37:20	+3:01
7	Dan McConnell (AUS)	1:37:26	+3:07
8	Harry Birchill (ENG)	1:37:56	+3:37
9	Christopher McGlinchey (NIR)	1:40:19	+6:00
10	Rhys Hidrio (JEY)	1:41:29	+7:10
11	Alexandre Mayer (MRI)	-1 LAP	—
12	James Roe (GGY)	-1 LAP	—
13	Hugo Hahn (NAM)	-1 LAP	—
14	Tumelo Makae (LES)	-1 LAP	—
15	Yannick Lincoln (MRI)	-1 LAP	—
16	Charlie Aldridge (SCO)	-1 LAP	—
17	Xavier Papo (NAM)	-3 LAP	—
18	Gontse Lethokwe (BOT)	-3 LAP	—
19	Phetetso Monese (LES)	-3 LAP	—
20	Michael Serafin (GGY)	-3 LAP	—
21	Edwin Ndungu (KEN)	-4 LAP	—
22	Davies Kawemba (ZAM)	-4 LAP	—
23	Giles Cerisola (GIB)	-5 LAP	—
24	Karl Sciortino (GIB)	-5 LAP	—
25	Oberd Chembe (ZAM)	-5 LAP	—
—	Christos Philokyprou (CYP)	DNF	—
