= Josh Duffy =

Australian track cyclist (born 2000)

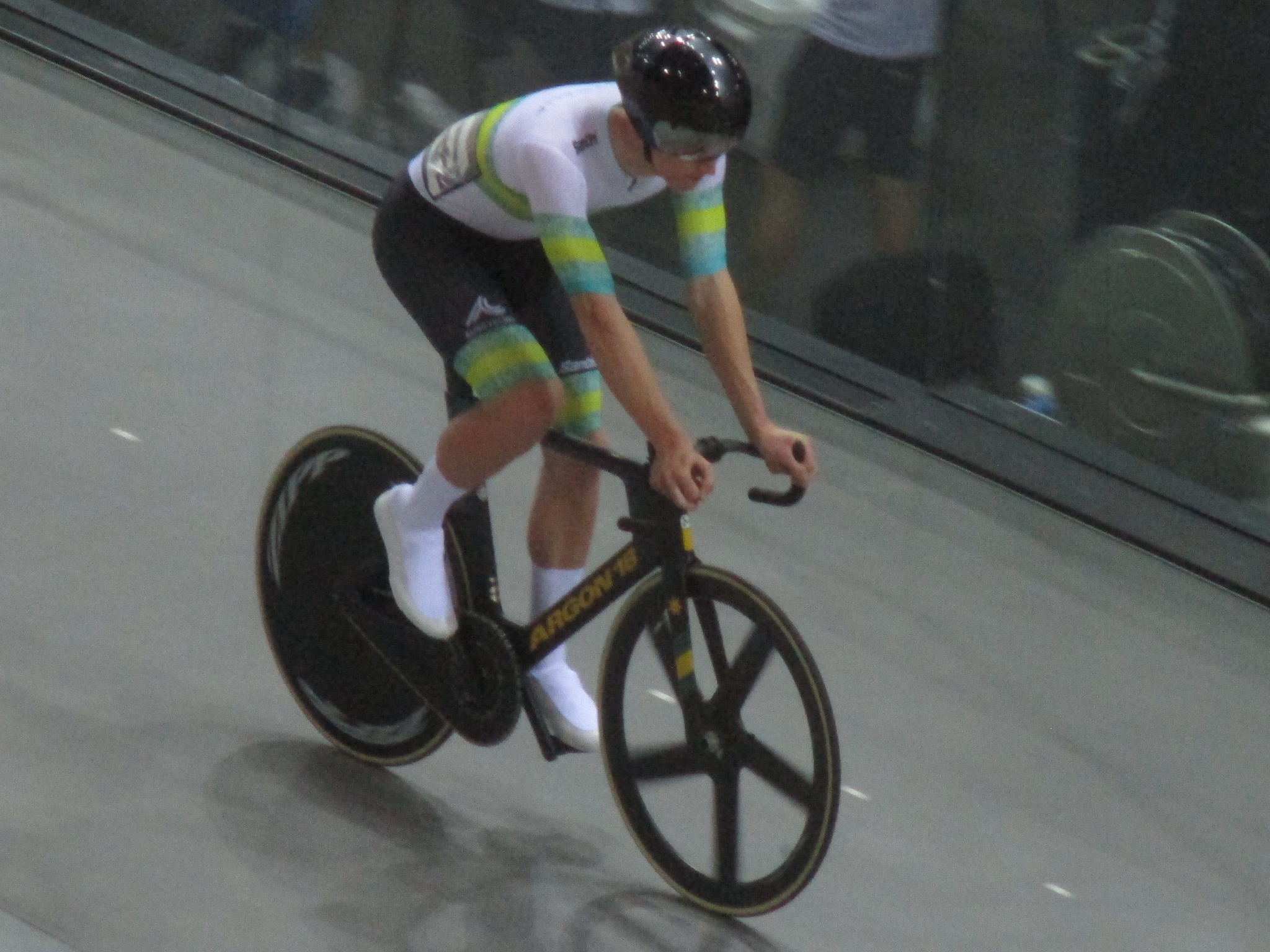
- Duffy in 2022

Personal information
- Born: 24 June 2000 (age 26) Brisbane, Australia

Cycling career
- Sport: Cycling
- Current team: Team BridgeLane
- Disciplines: Track; Road
- Role: Rider

Amateur teams
- 2017–2019: TIS Racing Team
- 2019: Campolina Racing and Breeding
- 2020–2022: InForm TM Insight MAKE

Professional team
- 2023–: Team BridgeLane
Medal record
Men's track cycling
Representing Australia
Commonwealth Games
Bronze medal – third place	2022 Birmingham	Team pursuit

Joshua Duffy (born 24 June 2000) is an Australian road and track cyclist, who currently rides for UCI Continental team Team BridgeLane. He won a bronze medal in the team pursuit at the 2022 Commonwealth Games.

== Major results ==
=== Track ===
2018
3rd Team pursuit, Oceanian Championships
2019
1st Team pursuit, Oceanian Championships
2nd Kilometer, National Championships
2020
National Championships

1st Scratch
2nd Kilometer

2021
National Championships

2nd Kilometer
3rd Scratch
3rd Omnium

2022
Oceanian Championships

1st Madison (with Conor Leahy)
1st Team pursuit
3rd Scratch

National Championships

1st Scratch
1st Madison (with Conor Leahy)
1st Kilometer

1st Team pursuit – Milton, UCI Nations Cup
3rd Team pursuit, Commonwealth Games

=== Road ===
2022
2nd Criterium, National Under-23 Road Championships
