= William Roberts (cyclist) =

British cyclist

Personal information
- Nickname: Will
- Born: 4 June 1998 (age 28) Wales
- Height: 1.78 m (5 ft 10 in)
- Weight: 69 kg (152 lb)

Cycling career
- Sport: Cycling
- Current team: Saint Piran
- Disciplines: Track; Road
- Role: Rider

Amateur teams
- 2016: Pro Vision SJ Junior Academy
- 2018–2022: Wales Racing Academy
- 2021: Velo Schils Interbike RT

Professional team
- 2023–: Saint Piran
Medal record
Representing Wales
Commonwealth Games
| Bronze medal – third place | 2022 Birmingham | scratch race |

William Roberts (born 4 June 1998) is a British and Welsh track cyclist, who currently rides for UCI Continental team Saint Piran. He has represented Wales at the Commonwealth Games and won a bronze medal.

== Cycling career ==
Roberts was part of the Wales Racing Academy when he became a British champion, after winning the team pursuit event at the 2022 British National Track Championships.

Later in 2022, he was selected for the 2022 Commonwealth Games in Birmingham where he competed in the men's scratch race and won a bronze medal. His success during 2022 continued as he won a silver medal in the inaugural Elimination race at the 2022 National Championships.

Roberts won his second title at the 2023 British Cycling National Track Championships, he won the team pursuit for the second time. The following year in 2024, he won the team pursuit, at the 2024 British Cycling National Track Championships.

== Major results ==
2022
1st Team pursuit, National Track Championships
3rd Scratch, Commonwealth Games
2023
National Track Championships

1st Team pursuit
3rd Individual pursuit

2024
National Track Championships

1st Team pursuit
2nd Individual pursuit
2nd Points race
3rd Scratch
