= Graeme Frislie =

Australian track cyclist

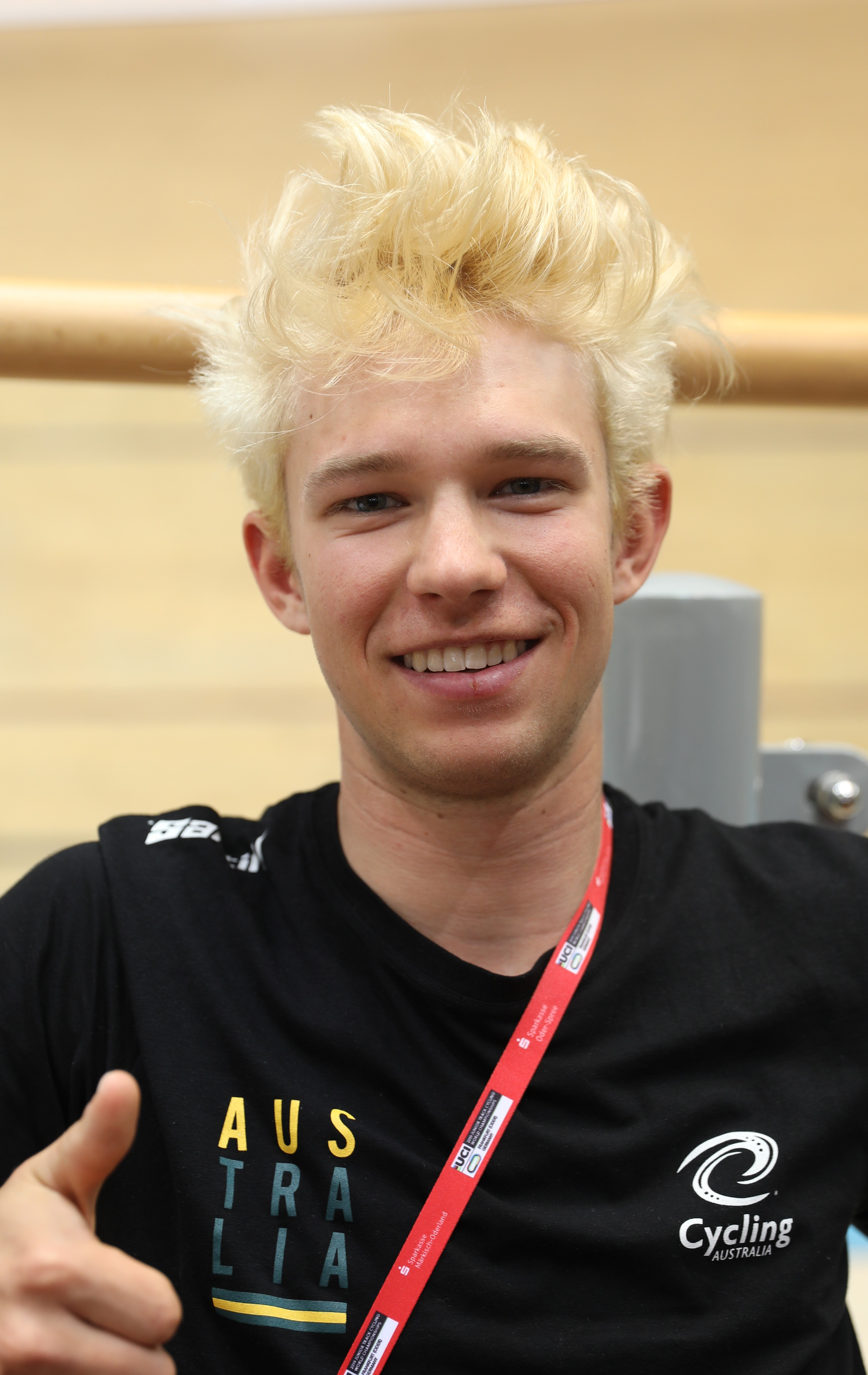
- Graeme Frislie (2019)

Personal information
- Born: 2 February 2001 (age 25) Kalispell, Montana, United States

Cycling career
- Sport: Cycling
- Current team: CCACHE x BODYWRAP
- Disciplines: Track; Road
- Role: Rider

Amateur teams
- 2020: Subaru–Giant Racing Team
- 2021–2022: InForm TM Insight MAKE

Professional team
- 2023–: CCACHE x Par Küp
Medal record
Men's track cycling
Representing Australia
World Junior Championships
Silver medal – second place	2019 Frankfurt	Omnium
Commonwealth Games
Bronze medal – third place	2022 Birmingham	Team pursuit

Graeme Frislie (born 2 February 2001) is an American road and track cyclist, who currently rides for UCI Continental team CCACHE x BODYWRAP. He won a bronze medal in the team pursuit competing for Australia at the 2022 Commonwealth Games. Frislie represented Australia until 2024, when changed his nationality to American; the country he was born in.

In March 2025 at the UCI Nations Cup, Frislie, alongside Ashlin Barry, Anders Johnson and David Domonoske, set the American record in the team pursuit in a time of 3:47.503, beating the previous record by five seconds. The team finished second in the process.

== Major results ==
=== Track ===
2019
Australian National Junior Championships

1st Team pursuit
1st Scratch
1st Madison
1st Kilometer

2nd Omnium, UCI Junior World Championships
2020
Australian National Championships

2nd Scratch
3rd Kilometer

2021
Australian National Championships

1st Team pursuit
1st Scratch
1st Elimination race

2022
Oceanian Championships

1st Elimination race
1st Team pursuit
3rd Omnium

Australian National Championships

1st Team pursuit
1st Omnium
1st Elimination race
2nd Scratch

UCI Nations Cup

1st Team pursuit, Milton

3rd Team pursuit, Commonwealth Games
2023
Oceanian Championships

2nd Madison
3rd Team pursuit

2024
Oceanian Championships

2nd Omnium
2nd Team pursuit
2nd Elimination race

UCI Nations Cup

3rd Elimination race, Hong Kong

2025
United States National Championships

1st Elimination race
1st Omnium
1st Team pursuit

UCI Nations Cup

2nd Team pursuit, Konya

=== Road ===
2019
2nd Criterium, Australian National Junior Championships
2022
1st Criterium, Australian National Under-23 Championships
1st Stage 2 Tour of Tasmania
2023
1st Criterium, Australian National Under-23 Championships
2nd Overall Bay Crits

1st Stage 2

2024
1st Overall Tour of Gippsland

1st Stages 1 & 3

1st Tour de Brisbane
1st Stage 8 Tour of Southland
