= England at the 2022 Commonwealth Games =

- Flag of England
- CG code: ENG
- CGA: Commonwealth Games England
- Website: teamengland.org

in Birmingham, England 28 July 2022 – 8 August 2022
- Competitors: 438 (209 men and 229 women) in 21 sports
- Flag bearers (opening): Jack Laugher; Emily Campbell
- Flag bearer (closing): Jake Jarman
- Medals Ranked 2nd: Gold 58 Silver 65 Bronze 53 Total 176

Commonwealth Games appearances (overview)
- 1930; 1934; 1938; 1950; 1954; 1958; 1962; 1966; 1970; 1974; 1978; 1982; 1986; 1990; 1994; 1998; 2002; 2006; 2010; 2014; 2018; 2022; 2026; 2030

England competed at the 2022 Commonwealth Games in Birmingham between 28 July and 8 August 2022. Having competed at every Games since their 1930 inauguration, it was England's twenty-second appearance (and third appearance as the host nation).

Following the CGF's decision to revoke Durban's hosting rights, Birmingham was chosen as the English host candidate and submitted its bid. Though originally deemed not fully compliant, adjustments to the bid ensured the city was awarded the hosting rights in December 2017.

Jack Laugher and Emily Campbell were the country's flagbearers during the opening ceremony, and Jake Jarman was the country's flagbearer at the closing ceremony.

England finished second in the medal table behind Australia with 58 gold medals, 65 silver medals and 53 bronze medals.

== Administration ==
On 19 September 2019, Commonwealth Games England announced that Mark England had been appointed Chef de Mission for the England team in Birmingham. He fulfilled the same role for Team GB at both the 2016 and 2020 Summer Olympics in Rio and Tokyo respectively.

== Competitors ==
The following is the list of number of competitors participating at the Games per sport/discipline.

Sport	Men	Women	Total
Athletics	44	48	92
Badminton	5	5	10
3x3 basketball	8	8	16
Beach volleyball	2	2	4
Boxing	8	6	14
Cricket	—N/a	15	15
Cycling	18	16	34
Diving	9	9	18
Gymnastics	6	8	13
Hockey	18	18	36
Judo	7	7	14
Lawn bowls	9	9	18
Netball	—N/a	12	12
Para powerlifting	3	3	6
Rugby sevens	13	13	26
Squash	5	4	9
Swimming	27	21	48
Table tennis	7	6	13
Triathlon	9	7	16
Weightlifting	7	8	15
Wrestling	5	4	9
Total	209	229	438

== Medal table (top three) ==
Rank	Nation	Gold	Silver	Bronze	Total
1	Australia	67	57	55	179
2	England	58	65	53	176
3	Canada	26	32	34	92
Totals (3 entries)		151	154	142	447

== Medallists ==
Medal	Name	Sport	Event	Date
Gold	Joe Fraser; James Hall; Jake Jarman; Giarnni Regini-Moran; Courtney Tulloch	Gymnastics	Men's artistic team all-around	29 July 2022
Gold	Alex Yee	Triathlon	Men's	29 July 2022
Gold	Alice Kinsella; Ondine Achampong; Georgia-Mae Fenton; Kelly Simm; Claudia Fragapane	Gymnastics	Women's artistic team all-around	30 July 2022
Gold	Ben Proud	Swimming	Men's 50 metre butterfly	30 July 2022
Gold	Johnboy Smith	Athletics	Men's marathon (T54)	30 July 2022
Gold	James Wilby	Swimming	Men's 100 metre breaststroke	31 July 2022
Gold	Alice Tai	Swimming	Women's 100 metre backstroke S8	31 July 2022
Gold	Alex Yee; Sophie Coldwell; Sam Dickinson; Georgia Taylor-Brown	Triathlon	Mixed relay	31 July 2022
Gold	Jake Jarman	Gymnastics	Men's artistic individual all-around	31 July 2022
Gold	Katie Crowhurst; Jessica Fullagar (guide)	Triathlon	Women's PTVI	31 July 2022
Gold	David Ellis; Luke Pollard (guide)	Triathlon	Men's PTVI	31 July 2022
Gold	Chris Murray	Weightlifting	Men's 81 kg	1 August 2022
Gold	Jamie Chestney; Louis Ridout; Nick Brett	Lawn Bowls	Men's triples	1 August 2022
Gold	Jake Jarman	Gymnastics	Men's floor	1 August 2022
Gold	Joe Fraser	Gymnastics	Men's pommel horse	1 August 2022
Gold	Courtney Tulloch	Gymnastics	Men's rings	1 August 2022
Gold	Georgia-Mae Fenton	Gymnastics	Women's uneven bars	1 August 2022
Gold	Laura Kenny	Cycling	Women's scratch race	1 August 2022
Gold	Ashley McKenzie	Judo	Men's 60 kg	1 August 2022
Gold	Sarah Davies	Weightlifting	Women's 71kg	1 August 2022
Gold	Maisie Summers-Newton	Swimming	Women's 100 metre breaststroke SB6	1 August 2022
Gold	Hannah Cockroft	Athletics	Women's 100 metres (T34)	2 August 2022
Gold	Emmanuel Oyinbo-Coker	Athletics	Men's 100 metres (T47)	2 August 2022
Gold	Adam Peaty	Swimming	Men's 50 metre breaststroke	2 August 2022
Gold	Brodie Williams	Swimming	Men's 200 metre backstroke	2 August 2022
Gold	Lachlan Moorhead	Judo	Men's 81 kg	2 August 2022
Gold	Daniel Powell	Judo	Men's 73 kg	2 August 2022
Gold	Alice Kinsella	Gymnastics	Women's floor	2 August 2022
Gold	Joe Fraser	Gymnastics	Men's parallel bars	2 August 2022
Gold	Jake Jarman	Gymnastics	Men's vault	2 August 2022
Gold	Orlan Jackman; Myles Hesson; Jamell Anderson; Jaydon Henry-McCalla	3x3 basketball	Men's tournament	2 August 2022
Gold	Evie Richards	Cycling	Women's cross-country	3 August 2022
Gold	Emily Campbell	Weightlifting	Women's +87 kg	3 August 2022
Gold	Jamal Petgrave	Judo	Men's 90 kg	3 August 2022
Gold	Emma Reid	Judo	Women's 78 kg	3 August 2022
Gold	Georgina Kennedy	Squash	Women's singles	3 August 2022
Gold	Ben Proud	Swimming	Men's 50 metre freestyle	3 August 2022
Gold	Katarina Johnson-Thompson	Athletics	Women's heptathlon	3 August 2022
Gold	Brodie Williams; James Wilby; James Guy; Tom Dean	Swimming	Men's 4 × 100 metre medley relay	3 August 2022
Gold	Jack Laugher	Diving	Men's 1 metre springboard	4 August 2022
Gold	Andrea Spendolini-Sirieix	Diving	Women's 10 metre platform	4 August 2022
Gold	Zoe Newson	Para powerlifting	Women's lightweight	4 August 2022
Gold	Nathan Maguire	Athletics	Men's 1500 metres (T54)	5 August 2022
Gold	Jack Laugher; Anthony Harding	Diving	Men's synchronised 3 metre springboard	5 August 2022
Gold	Marfa Ekimova	Gymnastics	Women's rhythmic individual all-around	5 August 2022
Gold	Natalie Chestney; Sian Honnor; Jamie-Lea Winch	Lawn Bowls	Women's triples	5 August 2022
Gold	Noah Williams; Matty Lee	Diving	Men's synchronised 10 metre platform	5 August 2022
Gold	Nick Miller	Athletics	Men's hammer throw	6 August 2022
Gold	Daniel Goodfellow	Diving	Men's 3 m springboard	6 August 2022
Gold	Jack Hunter Spivey	Table tennis	Men's singles C3–5	6 August 2022
Gold	Jona Efoloko; Zharnel Hughes; Nethaneel Mitchell-Blake; Ojie Edoburun; Harry Aikines-Aryeetey	Athletics	Men's 4 × 100 m relay	7 August 2022
Gold	Lewis Williams	Boxing	Men's heavyweight	7 August 2022
Gold	Delicious Orie	Boxing	Men's super heavyweight	7 August 2022
Gold	England women's national field hockey team: Giselle Ansley; Grace Balsdon; Fiona Crackles; Sophie Hamilton; Sabbie Heesh; Maddie Hinch; Tessa Howard; Holly Hunt; Hannah Martin; Shona McCallin; Lily Owsley; Hollie Pearne-Webb; Flora Peel; Izzy Petter; Ellie Rayer; Anna Toman; Laura Unsworth; Lily Walker	Hockey	Women's tournament	7 August 2022
Gold	Liam Pitchford; Paul Drinkhall	Table tennis	Men's doubles	7 August 2022
Gold	Asha Philip; Imani-Lara Lansiquot; Bianca Williams; Daryll Neita; Ashleigh Nelson	Athletics	Women's 4 × 100 m relay	7 August 2022
Gold	Noah Williams; Andrea Spendolini-Sirieix	Diving	Mixed 10 m synchronised platform	8 August 2022
Gold	James Willstrop; Declan James	Squash	Men's doubles	8 August 2022
Silver	Lewis Burras; Tom Dean; Anna Hopkin; Freya Anderson	Swimming	Mixed 4 × 100 metre freestyle relay	29 July 2022
Silver	James Wilby	Swimming	Men's 200 metre breaststroke	29 July 2022
Silver	Ryan Owens; Joseph Truman; Hamish Turnbull	Cycling	Men's team sprint	29 July 2022
Silver	Daniel Bigham; Charlie Tanfield; Ethan Vernon; Oliver Wood	Cycling	Men's team pursuit	29 July 2022
Silver	Georgia Taylor-Brown	Triathlon	Women's	29 July 2022
Silver	Edward Mildred; Joe Litchfield; Jamie Ingram; Cameron Kurle	Swimming	Men's 4 × 100 metre freestyle relay	30 July 2022
Silver	Anna Hopkin; Abbie Wood; Isabella Hindley; Freya Anderson	Swimming	Women's 4 × 100 metre freestyle relay	30 July 2022
Silver	Brodie Williams	Swimming	Men's 100 metre backstroke	30 July 2022
Silver	Hannah Russell	Swimming	Women's 50 metre freestyle S13	30 July 2022
Silver	Tom Dean	Swimming	Men's 200 metre freestyle	30 July 2022
Silver	Imogen Clark	Swimming	Women's 50 metre breaststroke	30 July 2022
Silver	Eden Rainbow-Cooper	Athletics	Women's marathon (T54)	30 July 2022
Silver	Ondine Achampong	Gymnastics	Women's artistic individual all-around	31 July 2022
Silver	Sophie Unwin; Georgia Holt (pilot)	Cycling	Women's tandem 1 km time trial B	31 July 2022
Silver	Jessica Gordon Brown	Weightlifting	Women's 59 kg	31 July 2022
Silver	James Hall	Gymnastics	Men's artistic individual all-around	31 July 2022
Silver	Sophie Capewell	Cycling	Women's keirin	1 August 2022
Silver	Samuel Hall	Judo	Men's 60 kg	1 August 2022
Silver	Tom Dean	Swimming	Men's 100 metre freestyle	1 August 2022
Silver	Grace Harvey	Swimming	Women's 100 metre breaststroke SB6	1 August 2022
Silver	Acelya Toprak	Judo	Women's 57 kg	1 August 2022
Silver	James Guy; Jacob Whittle; Joe Litchfield; Tom Dean	Swimming	Men's 4 × 200 metre freestyle relay	1 August 2022
Silver	Sam Tolchard; Jamie Walker	Lawn Bowls	Men's pairs	2 August 2022
Silver	Giarnni Regini-Moran	Gymnastics	Men's vault	2 August 2022
Silver	Giarnni Regini-Moran	Gymnastics	Men's parallel bars	2 August 2022
Silver	Ondine Achampong	Gymnastics	Women's floor	2 August 2022
Silver	Gemma Howell	Judo	Women's 63 kg	2 August 2022
Silver	Molly Caudery	Athletics	Women's pole vault	2 August 2022
Silver	Laura Stephens	Swimming	Women's 200 metre butterfly	2 August 2022
Silver	James Guy	Swimming	Men's 100 metre butterfly	2 August 2022
Silver	Sophie Hahn	Athletics	Women's 100 metres (T38)	2 August 2022
Silver	Jade Lally	Athletics	Women's discus throw	2 August 2022
Silver	Shanice Beckford-Norton; Hannah Jump; Chantelle Handy; Cheridene Green	3x3 basketball	Women's tournament	2 August 2022
Silver	Kare Adenegan	Athletics	Women's 100 metres (T34)	2 August 2022
Silver	Tom Dean	Swimming	Men's 200 metre individual medley	3 August 2022
Silver	Jessica-Jane Applegate	Swimming	Women's 200 metre freestyle S14	3 August 2022
Silver	Lewis Burras	Swimming	Men's 50 metre freestyle	3 August 2022
Silver	Lois Toulson	Diving	Women's 10 metre platform	4 August 2022
Silver	Olivia Broome	Para powerlifting	Women's lightweight	4 August 2022
Silver	Lawrence Okoye	Athletics	Men's discus throw	4 August 2022
Silver	Zac Shaw	Athletics	Men's 100 metres (T12)	4 August 2022
Silver	Mark Swan	Para powerlifting	Men's lightweight	4 August 2022
Silver	Fred Wright	Cycling	Men's time trial	4 August 2022
Silver	Anna Henderson	Cycling	Women's time trial	4 August 2022
Silver	Daniel Sidbury	Athletics	Men's 1500 metres (T54)	5 August 2022
Silver	Lizzie Bird	Athletics	Women's 3000 metres steeplechase	5 August 2022
Silver	Zharnel Hughes	Athletics	Men's 200 m	6 August 2022
Silver	Adam Hague	Athletics	Men's pole vault	6 August 2022
Silver	Keely Hodgkinson	Athletics	Women's 800 m	6 August 2022
Silver	Jordan Houlden	Diving	Men's 3 m springboard	6 August 2022
Silver	Eden Cheng; Andrea Spendolini-Sirieix	Diving	Women's 10 m synchronised platform	6 August 2022
Silver	Amy Pharaoh; Sophie Tolchard	Lawn bowls	Women's pairs	6 August 2022
Silver	Matthew Hudson-Smith	Athletics	Men's 400 m	7 August 2022
Silver	Victoria Ohuruogu	Athletics	Women's 400 m	7 August 2022
Silver	Kiaran MacDonald	Boxing	Men's flyweight	7 August 2022
Silver	Demie-Jade Resztan	Boxing	Women's minimumweight	7 August 2022
Silver	Gemma Richardson	Boxing	Women's lightweight	7 August 2022
Silver	Adrian Waller; Alison Waters	Squash	Mixed doubles	7 August 2022
Silver	Ben Lane; Sean Vendy	Badminton	Men's doubles	8 August 2022
Silver	Chloe Birch; Lauren Smith	Badminton	Women's doubles	8 August 2022
Silver	Marcus Ellis; Lauren Smith	Badminton	Mixed doubles	8 August 2022
Silver	Kyle Kothari; Lois Toulson	Diving	Mixed 10 m synchronised platform	8 August 2022
Silver	Adrian Waller; Daryl Selby	Squash	Men's doubles	8 August 2022
Silver	Sarah-Jane Perry; Alison Waters	Squash	Women's doubles	8 August 2022
Silver	Liam Pitchford	Table tennis	Men's singles	8 August 2022
Bronze	Laura Kenny; Josie Knight; Maddie Leech; Sophie Lewis	Cycling	Women's team pursuit	29 July 2022
Bronze	Stephen Bate; Christopher Latham (pilot)	Cycling	Men's tandem 1 km time trial B	29 July 2022
Bronze	Fraer Morrow	Weightlifting	Women's 55 kg	30 July 2022
Bronze	Simon Lawson	Athletics	Men's marathon (T54)	30 July 2022
Bronze	Freya Colbert; Tamryn van Selm; Abbie Wood; Freya Anderson	Swimming	Women's 4 × 200 metre freestyle relay	31 July 2022
Bronze	James Guy	Swimming	Men's 200 metre butterfly	31 July 2022
Bronze	Sophie Capewell	Cycling	Women's 500 m time trial	31 July 2022
Bronze	Giarnni Regini-Moran	Gymnastics	Men's floor	1 August 2022
Bronze	Amy Platten	Judo	Women's 48 kg	1 August 2022
Bronze	Oliver Wood	Cycling	Men's points race	1 August 2022
Bronze	Abbie Wood	Swimming	Women's 200 metre individual medley	1 August 2022
Bronze	Fabienne André	Athletics	Women's 100 metres (T34)	2 August 2022
Bronze	Alicia Wilson; Greg Butler; Edward Mildred; Abbie Wood	Swimming	Mixed 4 × 100 metre medley relay	2 August 2022
Bronze	Ola Abidogun	Athletics	Men's 100 metres (T47)	2 August 2022
Bronze	James Hollis	Swimming	Men's 100 metre butterfly S10	2 August 2022
Bronze	Kelly Petersen-Pollard	Judo	Women's 70 kg	2 August 2022
Bronze	Katie-Jemima Yeats-Brown	Judo	Women's 70 kg	2 August 2022
Bronze	Amy Conroy; Jade Atkin; Joy Haizelden; Charlotte Moore	3x3 basketball	Women's wheelchair tournament	2 August 2022
Bronze	Tyler Baines; Lee Manning; Abderrahim Taghrest; Charlie McIntyre	3x3 basketball	Men's wheelchair tournament	2 August 2022
Bronze	Kieran Rollings; Craig Bowler	Lawn bowls	Men's pairs B6–8	2 August 2022
Bronze	Liam Pitchford; Paul Drinkhall; Sam Walker; Tom Jarvis	Table Tennis	Men's team	2 August 2022
Bronze	Sarah-Jane Perry	Squash	Women's singles	3 August 2022
Bronze	Louise Fiddes	Swimming	Women's 200 metre freestyle S14	3 August 2022
Bronze	Rhys Thompson	Judo	Men's 100 kg	3 August 2022
Bronze	Harry Lovell-Hewitt	Judo	Men's 100 kg	3 August 2022
Bronze	Luke Turley	Swimming	Men's 1500 metre freestyle	3 August 2022
Bronze	Jade O'Dowda	Athletics	Women's heptathlon	3 August 2022
Bronze	Lauren Cox; Molly Renshaw; Laura Stephens; Anna Hopkin	Swimming	Women's 4 × 100 metre medley relay	3 August 2022
Bronze	Daryll Neita	Athletics	Women's 100 metres	3 August 2022
Bronze	Jordan Houlden	Diving	Men's 1 metre springboard	4 August 2022
Bronze	Andrew Pozzi	Athletics	Men's 110 metres hurdles	4 August 2022
Bronze	Alice Leaper; Marfa Ekimova; Saffron Severn	Gymnastics	Women's rhythmic team all-around	4 August 2022
Bronze	Alison Yearling; Chris Turnbull; Susan Wherry; Mark Wherry	Lawn Bowls	Mixed pairs B2–3	5 August 2022
Bronze	George Ramm	Wrestling	Men's freestyle 65 kg	5 August 2022
Bronze	Amy Rollinson	Diving	Women's 1 metre springboard	5 August 2022
Bronze	Scott Lincoln	Athletics	Men's shot put	5 August 2022
Bronze	Mandhir Kooner	Wrestling	Men's freestyle 125 kg	5 August 2022
Bronze	Naomi Metzger	Wrestling	Women's triple jump	5 August 2022
Bronze	Harry Coppell	Athletics	Men's pole vault	6 August 2022
Bronze	Lewis Richardson	Boxing	Men's middleweight	6 August 2022
Bronze	Aaron Bowen	Boxing	Men's light heavyweight	6 August 2022
Bronze	Savannah Stubley	Boxing	Women's light flyweight	6 August 2022
Bronze	Jack Laugher	Diving	Men's 3 m springboard	6 August 2022
Bronze	Robyn Birch; Emily Martin	Diving	Women's 10 m synchronised platform	6 August 2022
Bronze	Nick Brett; Jamie Chestney; Louis Ridout; Sam Tolchard	Lawn bowls	Men's fours	6 August 2022
Bronze	Georgina Nelthorpe	Wrestling	Women's -76 kg	6 August 2022
Bronze	Ben Pattison	Athletics	Men's 800 m	7 August 2022
Bronze	Jodie Williams	Athletics	Women's 400 m	7 August 2022
Bronze	Cindy Sember	Athletics	Women's 100 m hurdles	7 August 2022
Bronze	Javier Bello; Joaquin Bello	Beach volleyball	Men's tournament	7 August 2022
Bronze	Matthew Lee	Diving	Men's 10 m platform	7 August 2022
Bronze	Ross Wilson	Table tennis	Men's singles C8–10	7 August 2022
Bronze	England men's national field hockey team: James Albery; Liam Ansell; Nick Bandurak; Will Calnan; David Condon; Brendan Creed; David Goodfield; Chris Griffiths; James Mazarelo; Ollie Payne; Phil Roper; Stuart Rushmere; Ian Sloan; Rhys Smith; Tom Sorsby; Zachary Wallace; Jack Waller; Samuel Ward	Hockey	Men's tournament	8 August 2022

Medals by sport
Sport	1st place, gold medalist(s)	2nd place, silver medalist(s)	3rd place, bronze medalist(s)	Total
Athletics	8	14	12	34
Badminton	0	3	0	3
3x3 basketball	1	1	2	4
Beach volleyball	0	0	1	1
Boxing	2	3	3	8
Cricket	0	0	0	–
Cycling	2	6	4	12
Diving	6	4	5	15
Gymnastics	11	5	2	18
Hockey	1	0	1	2
Judo	5	3	5	13
Lawn bowls	2	2	3	7
Netball	0	0	0	–
Powerlifting	1	2	0	3
Rugby sevens	0	0	0	–
Squash	2	3	1	6
Swimming	8	16	8	32
Table tennis	2	1	2	5
Triathlon	4	1	0	5
Weightlifting	3	1	1	5
Wrestling	0	0	3	3
Total	58	65	53	176

Medals by day
Day	1st place, gold medalist(s)	2nd place, silver medalist(s)	3rd place, bronze medalist(s)	Total
29 July	2	5	2	9
30 July	3	7	2	12
31 July	6	4	3	13
1 August	10	6	4	20
2 August	10	12	10	32
3 August	8	3	8	19
4 August	3	7	3	13
5 August	5	2	6	13
6 August	3	6	8	17
7 August	6	6	6	18
8 August	2	7	1	10
Total	58	65	53	176

Medals by gender
Gender	1st place, gold medalist(s)	2nd place, silver medalist(s)	3rd place, bronze medalist(s)	Total
Female	20	32	23	75
Male	36	29	28	93
Mixed	2	4	2	8
Total	58	65	53	176

=== Multiple medallists ===
The following Team England competitors won multiple medals at the 2022 Commonwealth Games.

Name	Medal	Sport	Event
Jake Jarman	Gold; Gold; Gold; Gold	Gymnastics	Men's artistic team all-around Men's artistic individual all-around Men's floor Men's vault
Joe Fraser	Gold; Gold; Gold	Gymnastics	Men's artistic team all-around Men's pommel horse Men's parallel bars
James Wilby	Gold; Gold; Silver; Bronze	Swimming	Men's 100 metre breaststroke Men's 4 x 100 metre medley relay Men's 200 metre breaststroke Mixed 4 × 100 metre medley relay
Brodie Williams	Gold; Gold; Silver	Swimming	Men's 200 metre backstroke Men's 4 × 100 metre medley relay Men's 100 metre backstroke
Alice Kinsella	Gold; Gold	Gymnastics	Women's artistic team all-around Women's floor
Georgia-Mae Fenton	Gold; Gold	Gymnastics	Women's artistic team all-around Women's uneven bars
Jack Laugher	Gold; Gold	Diving	Men's 1 metre springboard Men's synchronised 3 metre springboard
Alex Yee	Gold; Gold	Triathlon	Men's; Mixed relay
Courtney Tulloch	Gold; Gold	Gymnastics	Men's artistic team all-around Men's rings
Tom Dean	Gold; Silver; Silver; Silver; Silver; Silver; Silver	Swimming	Men's 4 × 100 metre medley relay Mixed 4 × 100 metre medley relay Men's 200 metre freestyle Men's 4 × 100 metre freestyle relay Men's 100 metre freestyle Men's 4 × 200 metre freestyle relay Men's 200 metre individual medley
James Guy	Gold; Silver; Silver; Silver; Bronze; Bronze	Swimming	Men's 4 × 100 metre freestyle relay Mixed 4 × 100 metre freestyle relay Men's 4 × 200 metre freestyle relay Men's 100 metre butterfly Men's 200 metre butterfly Mixed 4 × 100 metre medley relay
Jacob Whittle	Gold; Silver; Silver; Silver	Swimming	Men's 4 × 100 metre medley relay Mixed 4 × 100 metre freestyle relay Men's 4 × 100 metre freestyle relay Men's 4 × 200 metre freestyle relay
Giarnni Regini-Moran	Gold; Silver; Silver; Bronze	Gymnastics	Men's artistic team all-around Men's floor Men's vault Men's parallel bars
Ondine Achampong	Gold; Silver; Silver	Gymnastics	Women's artistic team all-around Women's artistic individual all-around Women's floor
James Hall	Gold; Silver	Gymnastics	Men's artistic team all-around Men's artistic individual all-around
Zharnel Hughes	Gold; Silver	Athletics	Men's 4 x 100 metre relay Men's 200 metres
Greg Butler	Gold; Bronze	Swimming	Men's 4 × 100 metre medley relay Mixed 4 × 100 metre medley relay
Daryll Neita	Gold; Bronze	Athletics	Women's 4 x 100 metre relay Women's 100 metres
Laura Kenny	Gold; Bronze	Cycling	Women's scratch race Women's team pursuit
Freya Anderson	Silver; Silver; Bronze; Bronze	Swimming	Mixed 4 × 100 metre freestyle relay Women's 4 × 100 metre freestyle relay Women's 4 × 200 metre freestyle relay Mixed 4 × 100 metre medley relay
Anna Hopkin	Silver; Silver; Bronze	Swimming	Mixed 4 × 100 metre freestyle relay Women's 4 × 100 metre freestyle relay Women's 4 × 100 metre medley relay

== Athletics ==
On 5 May 2022, Team England selected two athletes for the marathons. Twenty-one para athletes were added on 19 May 2022, having qualified via the World Para Athletics World Rankings for performances registered between 31 December 2020 and 25 April 2022.

The full squad of ninety-three (with seventy athletes added) was announced on 22 June 2022. Abigail Irozuru was later added following an injury withdrawal from the cycling squad. Thomas Young withdrew from the Games due to an injury. On 24 July 2022, it was announced that Max Burgin had been forced to withdraw from the team after being diagnosed with DVT. It was announced that Jamie Webb and Bianca Williams would replace Burgin and Desiree Henry who had also been obliged to withdraw from the team due to injury. On 27 July, Dina Asher-Smith withdrew from the Games, after having injured herself at the 2022 World Athletics Championships.

Men
Track and road events

Athlete	Event	Heat		Semifinal		Final	
Athlete	Event	Result	Rank	Result	Rank	Result	Rank
Nethaneel Mitchell-Blake	100 m	10.14	2 Q	10.13	1 Q	11.10	8
Ojie Edoburun	100 m	10.27	1 Q	10.30	3	Did not advance	
Zac Shaw	100 m (T12)	11.01	1 Q	—N/a		10.90	2nd place, silver medalist(s)
Shaun Burrows	100 m (T38)	—N/a				11.69	4
Ola Abidogun	100 m (T47)	11.31	2 Q	—N/a		11.13	3rd place, bronze medalist(s)
James Arnott	100 m (T47)	11.50	2 Q	—N/a		11.45	4
Emmanuel Oyinbo-Coker	100 m (T47)	11.18	1 Q	—N/a		10.94	1st place, gold medalist(s)
Adam Gemili	200 m	20.92	1 Q	20.97	4	Did not advance	
Zharnel Hughes	200 m	20.30	1 Q	20.32	1 Q	20.12	2nd place, silver medalist(s)
Matthew Hudson-Smith	400 m	46.26	1 Q	45.77	1 Q	44.81	2nd place, silver medalist(s)
Ben Pattison	800 m	1:48.00	1 Q	—N/a		1:48.25	3rd place, bronze medalist(s)
Jamie Webb	800 m	1:48.86	1 Q	—N/a		1:48.60	4
Elliot Giles	1500 m	3:37.98	5 Q	—N/a		3:33.56	9
Matthew Stonier	1500 m	3:48.50	2 Q	—N/a		3:32.50	7
Nathan Maguire	1500 m (T54)	—N/a				3:11.83	1st place, gold medalist(s)
Daniel Sidbury	1500 m (T54)	—N/a				3:12.15	2nd place, silver medalist(s)
Sam Atkin	5000 m	—N/a				DNS	
Patrick Dever	5000 m	—N/a				13:22.10	7
Marc Scott	5000 m	—N/a				13:19.64	4
Sam Atkin	10,000 m	—N/a				DNF	
Patrick Dever	10,000 m	—N/a				DNS	
Marc Scott	10,000 m	—N/a				DNS	
Tade Ojora	110 m hurdles	13.76	9	—N/a		Did not advance	
Andrew Pozzi	110 m hurdles	13.41	3 Q	—N/a		13.37	3rd place, bronze medalist(s)
Joshua Zeller	110 m hurdles	13.35	2 Q	—N/a		13.39	4
Chris McAlister	400 m hurdles	DNS		—N/a		Did not advance	
Zak Seddon	3000 m steeplechase	—N/a				8:46.11	8
Jona Efoloko; Zharnel Hughes; Nethaneel Mitchell-Blake; Ojie Edoburun; Harry Aikines-Aryeetey	4 × 100 m relay	38.48	1 Q	—N/a		38.35	1st place, gold medalist(s)
Tom Bosworth	10,000 m walk	—N/a				40:58.64	7
Callum Wilkinson	10,000 m walk	—N/a				39:06.28	4
Jonathan Mellor	Marathon	—N/a				2:15.31	6
Simon Lawson	Marathon (T54)	—N/a				1:45.59	3rd place, bronze medalist(s)
Johnboy Smith	Marathon (T54)	—N/a				1:41.15	1st place, gold medalist(s)
David Weir	Marathon (T54)	—N/a				2:05.08	7

Field events

Athlete	Event	Qualification		Final	
Athlete	Event	Distance	Rank	Distance	Rank
Joel Clarke-Khan	High jump	—N/a		2.22	5
Harry Coppell	Pole vault	—N/a		5.50	3rd place, bronze medalist(s)
Adam Hague	Pole vault	—N/a		5.55	2nd place, silver medalist(s)
Owen Heard	Pole vault	—N/a		5.25	5
Ben Williams	Triple jump	—N/a		16.03	8
Scott Lincoln	Shot put	—N/a		20.57	3rd place, bronze medalist(s)
Lawrence Okoye	Discus throw	63.79	3 q	64.99	2nd place, silver medalist(s)
Dan Greaves	Discus throw F44/64	—N/a		54.66	4
Joseph Ellis	Hammer throw	—N/a		73.09	4
Nick Miller	Hammer throw	—N/a		76.43	1st place, gold medalist(s)
Craig Murch	Hammer throw	—N/a		68.42	8

Combined events – Decathlon

Athlete	Event	100 m	LJ	SP	HJ	400 m	110H	DT	PV	JT	1500 m	Final	Rank
Harry Kendall	Result	11.25	7.10	13.62	1.91	49.20	15.72	42.08	4.40	59.90	4:50.22	7480	6
Harry Kendall	Points	806	838	705	723	852	765	707	731	736	617	7480	6

Women
Track and road events

Athlete	Event	Heat		Semifinal		Final	
Athlete	Event	Result	Rank	Result	Rank	Result	Rank
Imani-Lara Lansiquot	100 m	11.15	2 Q	11.18	3	Did not advance	
Daryll Neita	100 m	11.02	1 Q	10.90	1 Q	11.07	3rd place, bronze medalist(s)
Asha Philip	100 m	11.27	3 Q	11.35	4	Did not advance	
Kare Adenegan	100 m (T34)	—N/a				17.79	2nd place, silver medalist(s)
Fabienne André	100 m (T34)	—N/a				18.58	3rd place, bronze medalist(s)
Hannah Cockroft	100 m (T34)	—N/a				16.84	1st place, gold medalist(s)
Hetty Bartlett	100 m (T38)	13.38	3 Q	—N/a		13.41	6
Sophie Hahn	100 m (T38)	12.80	1 Q	—N/a		13.09	2nd place, silver medalist(s)
Ali Smith	100 m (T38)	13.14	2 Q	—N/a		13.30	4
Daryll Neita	200 m	DNS		Did not advance			
Victoria Ohuruogu	400 m	51.34	1 Q	51.00	1 Q	50.72	2nd place, silver medalist(s)
Ama Pipi	400 m	52.48	1 Q	51.95	3 Q	51.36	4
Jodie Williams	400 m	52.47	3 Q	51.98	3 Q	51.26	3rd place, bronze medalist(s)
Alexandra Bell	800 m	1:59.76	3 q	—N/a		2:00.52	6
Keely Hodgkinson	800 m	2:00.18	1 Q	—N/a		1:57.40	2nd place, silver medalist(s)
Katie Snowden	1500 m	4:16.09	2 Q	—N/a		4:07.15	7
Jessica Judd	5000 m	—N/a				DNS	
Amy-Eloise Markovc	5000 m	—N/a				14:56.60	4
Calli Thackery	5000 m	—N/a				15:24.82	10
Samantha Harrison	10,000 m	—N/a				31:21.53	6
Jessica Judd	10,000 m	—N/a				31:18.47	5
Amy-Eloise Markovc	10,000 m	—N/a				DNS	
Cindy Sember	100 m hurdles	12.87	1 Q	—N/a		12.59	3rd place, bronze medalist(s)
Jessie Knight	400 m hurdles	55.88	3 Q	—N/a		55.11	5
Lina Nielsen	400 m hurdles	58.95	6	—N/a		Did not advance	
Lizzie Bird	3000 m steeplechase	—N/a				9:17.79	2nd place, silver medalist(s)
Aimee Pratt	3000 m steeplechase	—N/a				9:27.41	4
Asha Philip; Imani-Lara Lansiquot; Bianca Williams; Daryll Neita; Ashleigh Nelson	4 × 100 m relay	42.72	2 Q	—N/a		42.41	1st place, gold medalist(s)
Victoria Ohuruogu; Jodie Williams; Ama Pipi; Jessie Knight; Laviai Nielsen (Did not run)	4 × 400 m relay	—N/a				DQ	
Georgina Schwiening	Marathon	—N/a				2:40.09	11
Shelly Oxley-Woods	Marathon (T54)	—N/a				2:03.39	3
Eden Rainbow-Cooper	Marathon (T54)	—N/a				1:59.45	2nd place, silver medalist(s)

Field events

Athlete	Event	Qualification		Final	
Athlete	Event	Distance	Rank	Distance	Rank
Emily Borthwick	High jump	1.81	8 Q	1.76	11
Morgan Lake	High jump	1.81	1 Q	1.92	4
Laura Zialor	High jump	1.81	1 Q	1.85	8
Holly Bradshaw	Pole vault	—N/a		DNS	
Molly Caudery	Pole vault	—N/a		4.45	2nd place, silver medalist(s)
Sophie Cook	Pole vault	—N/a		4.25	8
Abigail Irozuru	Long jump	6.59	7 q	6.19	12
Jazmin Sawyers	Long jump	6.80	4 Q	6.84	4
Lorraine Ugen	Long jump	6.79	5 Q	6.60	5
Naomi Metzger	Triple jump	—N/a		14.37	3rd place, bronze medalist(s)
Sophie McKinna	Shot put	16.70	8 q	17.18	7
Divine Oladipo	Shot put	17.09	6 q	17.28	5
Amelia Strickler	Shot put	17.10	5 q	17.18	6
Jade Lally	Discus throw	—N/a		58.42	2nd place, silver medalist(s)
Stacie Gaston-Monerville	Discus throw F44/64	—N/a		27.37	6
Anna Purchase	Hammer throw	66.45	3 q	64.73	7

Combined events – Heptathlon

Athlete	Event	100H	HJ	SP	200 m	LJ	JT	800 m	Final	Rank
Katarina Johnson-Thompson	Result	13.83	1.84	12.94	23.70	6.33	44.33	2:13.93	6377	1st place, gold medalist(s)
Katarina Johnson-Thompson	Points	1003	1029	723	1010	953	751	908	6377	1st place, gold medalist(s)
Holly Mills	Result	13.52	1.78	12.98	25.12	6.19	42.15	2:11.42	6095	4
Holly Mills	Points	1047	953	726	876	908	709	944	6095	4
Jade O’Dowda	Result	13.60	1.75	13.29	25.04	6.52	38.63	2:14.00	6212	3rd place, bronze medalist(s)
Jade O’Dowda	Points	1036	916	747	883	1014	641	907	6212	3rd place, bronze medalist(s)

== Badminton ==
As host nation, England automatically qualified for the mixed team event. A full squad of ten players was selected on 20 April 2022. Badminton England announced that Abigail Holden withdrew from the competition due to the knee injury.

Singles

Athlete	Event	Round of 64	Round of 32	Round of 16	Quarterfinal	Semifinal	Final / BM	
Athlete	Event	Opposition Score	Opposition Score	Opposition Score	Opposition Score	Opposition Score	Opposition Score	Rank
Toby Penty	Men's singles	Bye	Tang (AUS); W (21–11, 21–7)	Smith (SCO); W 2–0	Kidambi (IND); L 0–2	Did not advance		
Abigail Holden	Women's singles	Bye	Li (CAN); Withdrew	Did not advance				
Freya Patel-Redfearn	Women's singles	Scholtz (RSA); W (21–11, 21–12)	Vidanage (SRI); W (21–11, 21–14)	Yeo (SGP); L 0–2	Did not advance			

Doubles

Athlete	Event	Round of 64	Round of 32	Round of 16	Quarterfinal	Semifinal	Final / BM	
Athlete	Event	Opposition Score	Opposition Score	Opposition Score	Opposition Score	Opposition Score	Opposition Score	Rank
Ben Lane; Sean Vendy	Men's doubles	—N/a	Bye	Dong & Yakura (CAN); W 2–0	Pham & Yu (AUS); W 2–0	Chia & Yik (MAS); W 2–1	Rankireddy & Shetty (IND); L 0–2	2nd place, silver medalist(s)
Chloe Birch; Lauren Smith	Women's doubles	—N/a	Bye	Cheah & Lai (MAS); W 2–0	Kobugabe & Rafi (UGA); W 2–0	Hsuan-yu & Somerville (AUS); W 2–0	Tan & Muralitharan (MAS); L 0–2	2nd place, silver medalist(s)
Jessica Pugh; Callum Hemming	Mixed doubles	Bye	Sumeeth Reddy & Ponnappa (IND); W (21–18, 21–16)	Angus & Wynter (JAM); W 2–0	Tan & Lai (MAS); L 0–2	Did not advance		
Marcus Ellis; Lauren Smith	Mixed doubles	Bye	Martin & Scott (BAR); W (21–8, 21–8)	Wanagaliya & Kobugabe (UGA); W 2–0	Dias & Hendahewa (SRI); W 2–0	Hall & MacPherson (SCO); W 2–0	Hee & Tan (SGP); L 0–2	2nd place, silver medalist(s)

Mixed team

Summary

Team	Event	Group stage				Quarterfinal	Semifinal	Final / BM	
Team	Event	Opposition Score	Opposition Score	Opposition Score	Rank	Opposition Score	Opposition Score	Opposition Score	Rank
England	Mixed team	Barbados; W 5–0	Mauritius; W 5–0	Singapore; L 1–4	2 Q	Canada; W 3–0	Malaysia; L 0–3	Singapore; L 0–3	4

Squad

- Marcus Ellis
- Callum Hemming
- Ben Lane
- Toby Penty
- Sean Vendy
- Chloe Birch
- Freya Patel-Redfearn
- Jessica Pugh
- Lauren Smith

Group stage

Pos	Team	Pld	W	L	MF	MA	MD	GF	GA	GD	PF	PA	PD	Pts	Qualification
1	Singapore	3	3	0	14	1	+13	29	2	+27	639	301	+338	3	Knockout stage
2	England	3	2	1	11	4	+7	22	9	+13	577	367	+210	2	Knockout stage
3	Mauritius	3	1	2	4	11	−7	9	22	−13	386	583	−197	1	
4	Barbados	3	0	3	1	14	−13	2	29	−27	296	647	−351	0	

Source: BWF

England
5
National Exhibition Centre, Court 1
29 July 2022, 09:00 UTC+1

Barbados
0

			1	2	3
1	(England) (Barbados)	Marcus Ellis / Lauren Smith; Shae Martin / Sabrina Scott	21; 5	21; 9
2	(England) (Barbados)	Toby Penty; Kennie Maarten King	21; 5	21; 9
3	(England) (Barbados)	Freya Patel-Redfearn; Tamisha Williams	21; 6	21; 3
4	(England) (Barbados)	Ben Lane / Sean Vendy; Kennie Maarten King / Shae Martin	21; 5	21; 10
5	(England) (Barbados)	Chloe Birch / Jessica Pugh; Sabrina Scott / Tamisha Williams	21; 6	21; 9

England
5
National Exhibition Centre, Court 2
29 July 2022, 19:00 UTC+1

Mauritius
0

			1	2	3
1	(England) (Mauritius)	Callum Hemming / Jessica Pugh; Aatish Lubah / Lorna Bodha	21; 1	21; 13
2	(England) (Mauritius)	Toby Penty; Julien Paul	21; 14	21; 7
3	(England) (Mauritius)	Ben Lane / Sean Vendy; Tejraj Pultoo / Alexandre Bongout	21; 9	21; 9
4	(England) (Mauritius)	Freya Patel-Redfearn; Ganesha Mungrah	21; 9	21; 7
5	(England) (Mauritius)	Lauren Smith / Chloe Birch; Kobita Dookhee / Lorna Bodha	21; 4	21; 8

England
1
National Exhibition Centre, Court 1
30 July 2022, 14:00 UTC+1

Singapore
4

			1	2	3
1	(England) (Singapore)	Marcus Ellis / Lauren Smith; Terry Hee / Tan Wei Han	9; 21	15; 21
2	(England) (Singapore)	Toby Penty; Loh Kean Yew	12; 21	12; 21
3	(England) (Singapore)	Freya Patel-Redfearn; Yeo Jia Min	4; 21	8; 21
4	(England) (Singapore)	Ben Lane / Sean Vendy; Terry Hee / Loh Kean Hean	19; 21	21; 12	21; 18
5	(England) (Singapore)	Chloe Birch / Lauren Smith; Jin Yujia / Crystal Wong	19; 21	17; 21

Knock-out stage

Canada
0
National Exhibition Centre, Court 1
31 July 2022, 11:00 UTC+1

England
3

			1	2	3
1	(Canada) (England)	Ty Alexander Lindeman / Josephine Wu; Marcus Ellis / Lauren Smith	12; 21	9; 21
2	(Canada) (England)	Brian Yang; Toby Penty	19; 21	19; 21
3	(Canada) (England)	Adam Dong / Nyl Yakura; Ben Lane / Sean Vendy	17; 21	12; 21
4	(Canada) (England)	Michelle Li; Freya Patel-Redfearn				not played
5	(Canada) (England)	Rachel Honderich / Kristen Tsai; Chloe Birch / Lauren Smith				not played

Malaysia
3
National Exhibition Centre, Court 1
1 August 2022, 11:00 UTC+1

England
0

			1	2	3
1	(Malaysia) (England)	Chan Peng Soon / Cheah Yee See; Marcus Ellis / Lauren Smith	12; 21	21; 18	21; 13
2	(Malaysia) (England)	Ng Tze Yong; Toby Penty	21; 13	21; 14
3	(Malaysia) (England)	Aaron Chia / Soh Wooi Yik; Ben Lane / Sean Vendy	21; 17	21; 18
4	(Malaysia) (England)	Goh Jin Wei; Freya Patel-Redfearn				not played
5	(Malaysia) (England)	Pearly Tan / Thinaah Muralitharan; Chloe Birch / Lauren Smith				not played

England
0
National Exhibition Centre, Court 1
2 August 2022, 11:00 UTC+1

Singapore
3

			1	2	3
1	(England) (Singapore)	Ben Lane / Lauren Smith; Terry Hee / Tan Wei Han	17; 21	23; 25
2	(England) (Singapore)	Toby Penty; Loh Kean Yew	25; 23	11; 21	23; 25
3	(England) (Singapore)	Freya Patel-Redfearn; Yeo Jia Min	18; 21	14; 21
4	(England) (Singapore)	Ben Lane / Marcus Ellis; Andy Kwek / Terry Hee				not played
5	(England) (Singapore)	Chloe Birch / Lauren Smith; Crystal Wong / Jin Yujia				not played

== 3x3 basketball ==
As host nation, England automatically qualified for all four tournaments.

Squad selections were announced on 13 July 2022.

Summary

Team	Event	Group stage				Quarterfinal	Semifinal	Final / BM / CM	
Team	Event	Opposition Score	Opposition Score	Opposition Score	Rank	Opposition Score	Opposition Score	Opposition Score	Rank
England men's	Men's tournament	New Zealand; W 21–10	Trinidad and Tobago; W 21–6	Australia; W 17–12	1 Q	Bye	Canada; W 13–12	Australia; W 17–16	1st place, gold medalist(s)
England women's	Women's tournament	New Zealand; L 14–15	British Virgin Islands; W 22–5	Canada; W 21–17	2 Q	Kenya; W 21–12	Australia; W 21–15	Canada; L 13–14	2nd place, silver medalist(s)
England men's (WC)	Men's wheelchair tournament	South Africa; W 17–2	Malaysia; W 19–9	—N/a	1 Q	—N/a	Australia; L 11–12	Malaysia; W 21–11	3rd place, bronze medalist(s)
England women's (WC)	Women's wheelchair tournament	Kenya; W 20–1	Canada; L 8–13	—N/a	2 Q	—N/a	Australia; L 6–8	Scotland; W 12–10	3rd place, bronze medalist(s)

=== Men's tournament ===
Roster

- Jamell Anderson
- Jaydon Henry-McCalla
- Myles Hesson
- Orlan Jackman

Group play

Pos	Team	Pld	W	L	PF	PA	PD	Qualification
1	England (H)	3	3	0	59	28	+31	Direct to semi-finals
2	Australia	3	2	1	54	34	+20	Quarter-finals
3	New Zealand	3	1	2	42	54	−12	Quarter-finals
4	Trinidad and Tobago	3	0	3	24	63	−39	

Source: Birmingham 2022
Rules for classification: 1) Wins; 2) Head-to-head record; 3) Points scored.
(H) Hosts

30 July 2022
15:30

Report

New Zealand	10–21	England
Pts: Bezzant 4		Pts: Jackman 9

Smithfield

30 July 2022
19:30

Report

England	21–6	Trinidad and Tobago
Pts: Hesson 9		Pts: Joseph 3

Smithfield

31 July 2022
19:30

Report

England	17–12	Australia
Pts: Hesson 8		Pts: Johnson 8

Smithfield

Semi-finals

1 August 2022
22:00

Report

England	13–12	Canada
Pts: Hesson 6		Pts: Johnson 9

Smithfield

Gold medal match

2 August 2022
19:30

Report

Australia	16–17	England
Pts: Johnson 7		Pts: Hesson 6

Smithfield

=== Women's tournament ===
Roster

- Shanice Beckford-Norton
- Cheridene Green
- Chantelle Handy
- Hannah Jump

Group play

Pos	Team	Pld	W	L	PF	PA	PD	Qualification
1	New Zealand	3	3	0	55	30	+25	Direct to semi-finals
2	England (H)	3	2	1	57	37	+20	Quarter-finals
3	Canada	3	1	2	50	48	+2	Quarter-finals
4	British Virgin Islands	3	0	3	16	63	−47	

Source: Birmingham 2022
Rules for classification: 1) Wins; 2) Head-to-head record; 3) Points scored.
(H) Hosts

30 July 2022
15:30

Report

New Zealand	15–14	England
Pts: Harmon 7		Pts: Green 7

Smithfield

30 July 2022
19:30

Report

England	22–5	British Virgin Islands
Pts: Jump 14		Pts: Victor 3

Smithfield

31 July 2022
19:30

Report

England	21–17	Canada
Pts: Jump 9		Pts: Te-Biasu 12

Smithfield

Quarter-finals

1 August 2022
17:30

Report

England	21–12	Kenya
Pts: Jump 8		Pts: Otieno 4

Smithfield

Semi-finals

1 August 2022
19:30

Report

Australia	15–21	England
Pts: Mansfield 8		Pts: Green 8

Smithfield

Gold medal match

2 August 2022
19:30

Report

England	13–14	Canada
Pts: Beckford-Norton 6		Pts: Te-Biasu 7

Smithfield

=== Men's wheelchair tournament ===
Roster

- Tyler Baines
- Lee Manning
- Charlie McIntyre
- Abderrahim Taghrest

Group play

Pos	Team	Pld	W	L	PF	PA	PD	Qualification
1	England (H)	2	2	0	38	11	+27	Semi-finals
2	Malaysia	2	1	1	22	25	−3	Semi-finals
3	South Africa	2	0	2	8	30	−22	5th place match

Source: Birmingham 2022
Rules for classification: 1) Wins; 2) Head-to-head record; 3) Points scored.
(H) Hosts

29 July 2022
15:30

Report

England	17–2	South Africa
Pts: Manning 6		Pts: Mtatase 2

Smithfield

30 July 2022
15:30

Report

Malaysia	9–19	England
Pts: Zakaria 5		Pts: Manning 9

Smithfield

Semi-finals

1 August 2022
19:30

Report

England	11–12	Australia
Pts: Manning 7		Pts: Pople, Kavanagh 4

Smithfield

Bronze medal match

2 August 2022
15:00

Report

England	21–11	Malaysia
Pts: McIntyre 8		Pts: Zakaria 6

Smithfield

=== Women's wheelchair tournament ===
Roster

- Jade Atkin
- Amy Conroy
- Joy Haizelden
- Charlotte Moore

Group play

Pos	Team	Pld	W	L	PF	PA	PD	Qualification
1	Canada	2	2	0	30	9	+21	Semi-finals
2	England (H)	2	1	1	28	14	+14	Semi-finals
3	Kenya	2	0	2	2	37	−35	5th place match

Source: Birmingham 2022
Rules for classification: 1) Wins; 2) Head-to-head record; 3) Points scored.
(H) Hosts

29 July 2022
15:30

Report

Kenya	1–20	England
Pts: Wanjira 1		Pts: Moore, Atkin 6

Smithfield

31 July 2022
15:30

Report

England	8–13	Canada
Pts: Haizelden 5		Pts: Steeves 7

Smithfield

Semi-finals

1 August 2022
15:00

Report

Australia	8–6	England
Pts: Merritt 4		Pts: Conroy 3

Smithfield

Bronze medal match

2 August 2022
15:00

Report

Scotland	10–12	England
Pts: Hamer 5		Pts: Conroy 4

Smithfield

== Beach volleyball ==
As host nation, England automatically qualified for both the men's and women's tournaments. On 29 May 2022, Team England announced the selection of their beach volleyball pairings.

Athlete	Event	Preliminary Round				Quarterfinals	Semifinals	Finals	Rank
Athlete	Event	Opposition Score	Opposition Score	Opposition Score	Rank	Opposition Score	Opposition Score	Opposition Score	Rank
Javier Bello; Joaquin Bello	Men's tournament	Malosa – Isaac (TUV); W 2–0	Liotatis – Zorbis (CYP); W 2–0	O'Dea – Fuller (NZL); L 0–2	2 Q	Jawo – Jarra (GAM); W 2–1	Dearing – Schachter (CAN); L 1–2	Gatsinzi – Ntagengwa (RWA); W 2–0	3rd place, bronze medalist(s)
Jessica Grimson; Daisy Mumby	Women's tournament	Gwali – Donga (SOL); W 2–0	Beattie – Coutts (SCO); W 2–0	Pata – Toko (VAN); L 0–2	2 Q	Zeimann – Polley (NZL); L 0–2	Did not advance		

=== Men's tournament ===
Group C

Pos	Team	Pld	W	L	Pts	SW	SL	SR	SPW	SPL	SPR	Qualification
1	O'Dea – Fuller (NZL)	3	3	0	6	6	0	MAX	126	97	1.299	Quarterfinals
2	Bello – Bello (ENG)	3	2	1	5	4	2	2.000	119	93	1.280	Quarterfinals
3	Liotatis – Zorbis (CYP)	3	1	2	4	2	4	0.500	102	114	0.895	Ranking of third-placed teams
4	Malosa – Issac (TUV)	3	0	3	3	0	6	0.000	83	126	0.659	

Source: birmingham2022.com

Qualified for the Quarterfinals

30 July 2022; 14:30	Bello – Bello (ENG)	2–0	Malosa – Issac (TUV)	Smithfield
30 July 2022; 14:30	(21–10, 21–12); Report			Smithfield

1 August 2022; 14:30	Bello – Bello (ENG)	2–0	Liotatis – Zorbis (CYP)	Smithfield
1 August 2022; 14:30	(21–11, 21–18); Report			Smithfield

3 August 2022; 19:00	Bello – Bello (ENG)	0–2	O'Dea – Fuller (NZL)	Smithfield
3 August 2022; 19:00	(19–21, 16–21); Report			Smithfield

Quarter-finals

5 August 2022; 16:30	Bello – Bello (ENG)	2–1	Jawo – Jarra (GAM)	Smithfield
5 August 2022; 16:30	(21–16, 20–22, 15–12); Report			Smithfield

Semi-finals

6 August 2022; 16:00	Dearing – Schachter (CAN)	2–1	Bello – Bello (ENG)	Smithfield
6 August 2022; 16:00	(15–21, 21–13, 15–7); Report			Smithfield

Bronze medal match

7 August 2022; 15:00	Bello – Bello (ENG)	2–0	Ntagengwa – Gatsinze (RWA)	Smithfield
7 August 2022; 15:00	(21–11, 21–12); Report			Smithfield

=== Women's tournament ===
Group C

Pos	Team	Pld	W	L	Pts	SW	SL	SR	SPW	SPL	SPR	Qualification
1	Pata – Toko (VAN)	3	3	0	6	6	0	MAX	126	67	1.881	Quarterfinals
2	Grimson – Mumby (ENG)	3	2	1	5	4	2	2.000	112	90	1.244	Quarterfinals
3	Beattie – Coutts (SCO)	3	1	2	4	2	4	0.500	98	106	0.925	Ranking of third-placed teams
4	Gwali – Donga (SOL)	3	0	3	3	0	6	0.000	53	126	0.421	

Source: birmingham2022.com

31 July 2022; 19:00	Grimson – Mumby (ENG)	2–0	Gwali – Donga (SOL)	Smithfield
31 July 2022; 19:00	(21–10, 21–6); Report			Smithfield

2 August 2022; 19:00	Grimson – Mumby (ENG)	2–0	Beattie – Coutts (SCO)	Smithfield
2 August 2022; 19:00	(21–17, 21–15); Report			Smithfield

4 August 2022; 19:00	Grimson – Mumby (ENG)	0–2	Pata – Toko (VAN)	Smithfield
4 August 2022; 19:00	(9–21, 19–21); Report			Smithfield

Quarter-finals

5 August 2022; 20:00	Zeimann – Polley (NZL)	2–0	Grimson – Mumby (ENG)	Smithfield
5 August 2022; 20:00	(21–13, 21–15); Report			Smithfield

== Boxing ==
On 5 July 2022, Team England announced its squad of fourteen boxers.

Men

Athlete	Event	Round of 32	Round of 16	Quarterfinals	Semifinals	Final	
Athlete	Event	Opposition Result	Opposition Result	Opposition Result	Opposition Result	Opposition Result	Rank
Kiaran MacDonald	Flyweight	—N/a	Bandara (SRI); W 5–0	Mahommed (BOT); W 5–0	Dodd (WAL); W RSC	Panghal (IND); L 0–5	2nd place, silver medalist(s)
Niall Farrell	Featherweight	Bye	Gallagher (NIR); L RSC	Did not advance			
Joe Tyers	Light welterweight	Bandara (SRI); W 5–0	Ume (PNG); W RSC-1	Colin (MRI); L 1–4	Did not advance		
Harris Akbar	Light middleweight	Bye	Lartey (GHA); W 5–0	Walsh (NIR); L 2–3	Did not advance		
Lewis Richardson	Middleweight	Khan (WAL); W 5–0	Nkobeza (UGA); W 4–1	Le Poullain (GGY); W 5–0	Hickey (SCO); L RSC	Did not advance	3rd place, bronze medalist(s)
Aaron Bowen	Light heavyweight	Bye	Ehwarieme (NGR); W 5–0	Kumar (IND); W 4–1	Bevan (WAL); L 0–5	Did not advance	3rd place, bronze medalist(s)
Lewis Williams	Heavyweight	—N/a	Khan (PAK); W 5–0	Lavalou (PNG); W RSC	Coumi (AUS); W 5–0	Plodzicki-Faoagali (SAM); W 5–0	1st place, gold medalist(s)
Delicious Orie	Super heavyweight	—N/a	Bye	Paul (TTO); W 5–0	Mau'u (NZL); W 5–0	Ahlawat (IND); W 5–0	1st place, gold medalist(s)

Women

Athlete	Event	Round of 16	Quarterfinals	Semifinals	Final	
Athlete	Event	Opposition Result	Opposition Result	Opposition Result	Opposition Result	Rank
Demie-Jade Resztan	Minimumweight	—N/a	Tembo (ZAM); W 5–0	Modukanele (BOT); W 5–0	Ghangas (IND); L 0–5	2nd place, silver medalist(s)
Savannah Stubley	Light flyweight	Bye	Egunjobe (NGR); W 5–0	Zareen (IND); L 0–5	Did not advance	3rd place, bronze medalist(s)
Sameenah Toussaint	Featherweight	Andrews (WAL); W 4–1	Rahimi (AUS); L 0–5	Did not advance		
Gemma Richardson	Lightweight	Reid (SCO); W 5–0	Burden (IOM); W 5–0	Lamboria (IND); W 3–2	Broadhurst (NIR); L 0–5	2nd place, silver medalist(s)
Jodie Wilkinson	Light middleweight	Shogbamu (NGR); W 4–1	Nugent (NIR); L 0–4	Did not advance		
Kerry Davis	Middleweight	Sathoud (GHA); W 4–0	Gramane (MOZ); L 0–5	Did not advance		

== Cricket ==
As host nation, England automatically qualified for the tournament.

Fixtures were announced in November 2021. The squad was announced on 16 July 2022.

Summary

Team	Event	Group stage				Semifinal	Final / BM	
Team	Event	Opposition Result	Opposition Result	Opposition Result	Rank	Opposition Result	Opposition Result	Rank
England women	Women's tournament	Sri Lanka; W by 5 wickets	South Africa; W by 26 runs	New Zealand; W by 7 wickets	1 Q	India; L by 4 runs	New Zealand; L by 8 wickets	4

Squad

- Maia Bouchier
- Katherine Brunt
- Alice Capsey
- Kate Cross
- Freya Davies
- Sophia Dunkley
- Sophie Ecclestone
- Sarah Glenn
- Amy Jones
- Freya Kemp
- Heather Knight (c)
- Nat Sciver
- Bryony Smith
- Issy Wong
- Danni Wyatt

Group stage

Pos	Team	Pld	W	L	NR	Pts	NRR
1	England	3	3	0	0	6	1.826
2	New Zealand	3	2	1	0	4	0.068
3	South Africa	3	1	2	0	2	1.118
4	Sri Lanka	3	0	3	0	0	−2.805

Source: ESPNcricinfo

30 July 2022
18:00 (D/N)
Scorecard

Sri Lanka; 106/9 (20 overs)	v	England; 109/5 (17.1 overs)
Nilakshi de Silva 25 (28); Sophie Ecclestone 3/25 (4 overs)		Alice Capsey 44 (45); Inoka Ranaweera 3/29 (4 overs)

England won by 5 wickets
Edgbaston, Birmingham
Umpires: Eloise Sheridan (Aus) and Jacqueline Williams (WI)
Player of the match: Alice Capsey (Eng)

- Sri Lanka won the toss and elected to bat.
- Katherine Brunt (Eng) played in her 100th WT20I.

2 August 2022
11:00
Scorecard

England; 167/5 (20 overs)	v	South Africa; 141/4 (20 overs)
Alice Capsey 50 (37); Shabnim Ismail 2/27 (4 overs)		Laura Wolvaardt 41* (33); Katherine Brunt 1/16 (3 overs)

England won by 26 runs
Edgbaston, Birmingham
Umpires: Claire Polosak (Aus) and Vrinda Rathi (Ind)
Player of the match: Alice Capsey (Eng)

- South Africa won the toss and elected to field.

4 August 2022
18:00 (D/N)
Scorecard

New Zealand; 71/9 (20 overs)	v	England; 72/3 (11.4 overs)
Maddy Green 19 (24); Katherine Brunt 2/4 (3 overs)		Alice Capsey 23 (19); Amelia Kerr 2/27 (4 overs)

England won by 7 wickets
Edgbaston, Birmingham
Umpires: Vrinda Rathi (Ind) and Eloise Sheridan (Aus)
Player of the match: Katherine Brunt (Eng)

- New Zealand won the toss and elected to bat.

Semi-finals

6 August 2022
11:00
Scorecard

India; 164/5 (20 overs)	v	England; 160/6 (20 overs)
Smriti Mandhana 61 (32); Freya Kemp 2/22 (3 overs)		Nat Sciver 41 (43); Sneh Rana 2/28 (4 overs)

India won by 4 runs
Edgbaston, Birmingham
Umpires: Kim Cotton (NZ) and Eloise Sheridan (Aus)
Player of the match: Smriti Mandhana (Ind)

- India won the toss and elected to bat.

Bronze medal match

7 August 2022
10:00
Scorecard

England; 110/9 (20 overs)	v	New Zealand; 111/2 (11.5 overs)
Nat Sciver 27 (19); Hayley Jensen 3/24 (4 overs)		Sophie Devine 51* (40); Nat Sciver 1/8 (1 over)

New Zealand won by 8 wickets
Edgbaston, Birmingham
Umpires: Lauren Agenbag (SA) and Eloise Sheridan (Aus)
Player of the match: Sophie Devine (NZ)

- England won the toss and elected to bat.

== Cycling ==
On 15 June 2022, Team England announced its squad of thirty-three cyclists and two pilots, which includes Tokyo 2020 champions Laura Kenny and Matt Walls. The para cyclists were awarded with quota places earned via the UCI Individual Tandem B Track Para Rankings (for performances registered between 1 January 2021 and 18 April 2022).

Lauren Bate later withdrew from the Games owing to injury. On 28 July 2022, it was announced that Ethan Hayter had withdrawn from the Games due to his professional commitments with Ineos Grenadiers and he will be replaced on the track by Will Perrett.

=== Road ===
Men

Athlete	Event	Time	Rank
Jake Stewart	Road race	3:37.50	62
Connor Swift	Road race	3:37.08	49
Ben Turner	Road race	3:28.47	7
Ethan Vernon	Road race	3:37.08	20
Sam Watson	Road race	3:28.55	11
Fred Wright	Road race	3:28.29	5
Daniel Bigham	Time trial	50:04.66	12
Fred Wright	Time trial	46:47.52	2nd place, silver medalist(s)

Women

Athlete	Event	Time	Rank
Alice Barnes	Road race	2:44.46	10
Anna Henderson	Road race	2:44.46	24
Maddie Leech	Road race	2:45.37	36
Joscelin Lowden	Road race	2:44.53	28
Josie Nelson	Road race	2:45.05	34
Abi Smith	Road race	2:45.37	37
Anna Henderson	Time trial	40:38.55	2nd place, silver medalist(s)
Joscelin Lowden	Time trial	42:52.91	12
Abi Smith	Time trial	44:03.23	18

=== Track ===
Sprint

Athlete	Event	Qualification		Round 1	Quarterfinals	Semifinals	Final	
Athlete	Event	Time	Rank	Opposition Time	Opposition Time	Opposition Time	Opposition Time	Rank
Hayden Norris	Men's sprint	10.129	19	Did not advance				
Ryan Owens	Men's sprint	10.026	15 Q	Richardson (AUS); L	Did not advance			
Hamish Turnbull	Men's sprint	9.790	6 Q	Rorke (CAN); W	Carlin (SCO); L 0–2	Did not advance		
Ryan Owens; Joseph Truman; Hamish Turnbull; Hayden Norris	Men's team sprint	43.296	2 QG	—N/a			Australia; L 43.372	2nd place, silver medalist(s)
Sophie Capewell	Women's sprint	10.625	2 Q	Moir (SCO); W	Orban (CAN); W 2–0	Andrews (NZL); L 0–2	Bronze medal match Finucane (WAL); L 1–2	4
Blaine Ridge-Davis	Women's sprint	11.125	12 Q	Clonan (AUS); L	Did not advance			
Milly Tanner	Women's sprint	11.310	19	Did not advance				
Blaine Ridge-Davis; Milly Tanner; Sophie Capewell	Women's team sprint	48.358	5	—N/a			Did not advance	
Stephen Bate; Christopher Latham (pilot)	Men's tandem sprint B	10.814	5	—N/a		Did not advance		
Sophie Unwin; Georgia Holt (pilot)	Women's tandem sprint B	11.386	3 Q	—N/a		Scotland; L 1–2	Scotland; W 2–0	3

Keirin

Athlete	Event	1st Round	Repechage	Semifinals	Final
Athlete	Event	Rank	Rank	Rank	Rank
Hayden Norris	Men's keirin	5 R	2	Did not advance	
Joseph Truman	Men's keirin	3 R	1 Q	DNF	DNS
Hamish Turnbull	Men's keirin	1 Q	–	5	9 B
Sophie Capewell	Women's keirin	1 Q	–	2 Q	2nd place, silver medalist(s)
Blaine Ridge-Davis	Women's keirin	5 R	3	Did not advance	
Milly Tanner	Women's keirin	4 R	1 Q	3 Q	5

Time trial

Athlete	Event	Time	Rank
Hayden Norris	Men's time trial	1:01.285	6
Joseph Truman	Men's time trial	DNS	
Ethan Vernon	Men's time trial	1:01.418	7
Sophie Capewell	Women's time trial	33.522	3rd place, bronze medalist(s)
Blaine Ridge-Davis	Women's time trial	34.956	11
Milly Tanner	Women's time trial	34.871	10
Stephen Bate; Christopher Latham (pilot)	Men's tandem time trial B	1:02.276	3rd place, bronze medalist(s)
Sophie Unwin; Georgia Holt (pilot)	Women's tandem time trial B	1:07.554	2nd place, silver medalist(s)

Pursuit

Athlete	Event	Qualification		Final	
Athlete	Event	Time	Rank	Opponent Results	Rank
Daniel Bigham	Men's individual pursuit	4:11.078	6	Did not advance	
Will Perrett	Men's individual pursuit	4:14.393	10	Did not advance	
Charlie Tanfield	Men's individual pursuit	4:09.776	4 QB	Leahy (AUS); L 4:10.423	4
Daniel Bigham; Ethan Vernon; Oliver Wood; Charlie Tanfield; Will Perrett	Men's team pursuit	3:50.796	2 QG	New Zealand; L 3:49.584	2nd place, silver medalist(s)
Josie Knight	Women's individual pursuit	3:25.496	5	Did not advance	
Maddie Leech	Women's individual pursuit	3:34.420	12	Did not advance	
Grace Lister	Women's individual pursuit	3:39.773	14	Did not advance	
Josie Knight; Laura Kenny; Maddie Leech; Sophie Lewis; Grace Lister	Women's team pursuit	4:19.841	3 QB	Wales; W 4:17.096	3rd place, bronze medalist(s)

Points race

Athlete	Event	Final	
Athlete	Event	Points	Rank
Will Perrett	Men's points race	1	9
Oliver Wood	Men's points race	35	3rd place, bronze medalist(s)
Laura Kenny	Women's points race	5	13
Josie Knight	Women's points race	26	6
Maddie Leech	Women's points race	1	14

Scratch race

Athlete	Event	Qualification	Final
Ethan Vernon	Men's scratch race	1 Q	4
Matthew Walls	Men's scratch race	DNF	Did not advance
Oliver Wood	Men's scratch race	2 Q	8
Laura Kenny	Women's scratch race	—N/a	1st place, gold medalist(s)
Sophie Lewis	Women's scratch race	—N/a	13
Grace Lister	Women's scratch race	—N/a	14

=== Mountain Biking ===
Athlete	Event	Time	Rank
Harry Birchill	Men's cross-country	1:37.56	8
Joseph Blackmore	Men's cross-country	1:36.29	5
Evie Richards	Women's cross-country	1:35.59	1st place, gold medalist(s)

== Diving ==
On 21 June 2022, Team England announced its squad of eighteen divers, including Rio 2016 champion Jack Laugher and Tokyo 2020 champion Matty Lee.

Men

Athlete	Events	Semifinal		Final	
Athlete	Events	Points	Rank	Points	Rank
Jordan Houlden	1 m springboard	384.10	3 Q	429.30	3rd place, bronze medalist(s)
Jack Laugher	1 m springboard	383.90	4 Q	447.05	1st place, gold medalist(s)
Daniel Goodfellow	3 m springboard	430.05	3 Q	484.45	1st place, gold medalist(s)
Jordan Houlden	3 m springboard	414.35	5 Q	465.15	2nd place, silver medalist(s)
Jack Laugher	3 m springboard	350.90	11 Q	462.30	3rd place, bronze medalist(s)
Matthew Dixon	10 m platform	316.20	11 Q	Withdrawn	
Matthew Lee	10 m platform	424.05	3 Q	477.00	3rd place, bronze medalist(s)
Noah Williams	10 m platform	427.40	2 Q	408.90	7
Jack Laugher; Anthony Harding	3 m synchronised springboard	—N/a		438.33	1st place, gold medalist(s)
Ben Cutmore; Kyle Kothari	10 m synchronised platform	—N/a		391.35	4
Noah Williams; Matthew Lee	10 m synchronised platform	—N/a		429.78	1st place, gold medalist(s)

Women

Athlete	Events	Semifinal		Final	
Athlete	Events	Points	Rank	Points	Rank
Yasmin Harper	1 m springboard	274.60	2 Q	254.50	7
Amy Rollinson	1 m springboard	237.50	6 Q	272.00	3rd place, bronze medalist(s)
Desharne Bent-Ashmeil	3 m springboard	294.30	3 Q	315.45	4
Yasmin Harper	3 m springboard	278.45	5 Q	306.40	6
Evie Smith	3 m springboard	228.15	12 Q	275.90	10
Eden Cheng	10 m platform	280.80	8 Q	302.85	4
Andrea Spendolini-Sirieix	10 m platform	360.60	1 Q	357.50	1st place, gold medalist(s)
Lois Toulson	10 m platform	332.00	2 Q	337.30	2nd place, silver medalist(s)
Amy Rollinson; Desharne Bent-Ashmeil	3 m synchronised springboard	—N/a		278.10	4
Eden Cheng; Andrea Spendolini-Sirieix	10 m synchronised platform	—N/a		298.86	2nd place, silver medalist(s)
Robyn Birch; Emily Martin	10 m synchronised platform	—N/a		287.88	3rd place, bronze medalist(s)

Mixed

Athlete	Events	Final	
Athlete	Events	Points	Rank
Ben Cutmore; Desharne Bent-Ashmeil	3 m synchronised springboard	297.30	4
Jordan Houlden; Yasmin Harper	3 m synchronised springboard	268.59	8
Noah Williams; Andrea Spendolini-Sirieix	10 m synchronised platform	333.06	1st place, gold medalist(s)
Kyle Kothari; Lois Toulson	10 m synchronised platform	318.54	2nd place, silver medalist(s)

== Gymnastics ==
On 23 June 2022, Team England announced its squad of thirteen gymnasts, including former world champion Joe Fraser and four-time Commonwealth Games gold medallist in 2014, Claudia Fragapane.

=== Artistic ===
Men
Team Final & Individual Qualification

Athlete	Event	Apparatus						Total	Rank
Athlete	Event	F	PH	R	V	PB	HB	Total	Rank
Joe Fraser	Team	–	14.650 Q	14.450 Q	–	14.600 Q	14.500 Q	DNF	
James Hall	Team	13.250	13.800 Q	13.700	14.350	~~13.450~~	14.000 Q	82.550	1 Q
Jake Jarman	Team	13.750 Q	~~13.100~~	~~13.250~~	14.750 Q	13.800	13.400	82.050	2 Q
Giarnni Regini-Moran	Team	13.850 Q	13.150	–	15.000 Q	14.850 Q	~~13.350~~	—N/a	
Courtney Tulloch	Team	–	–	14.700 Q	–	–	–	—N/a	
Total	Team	40.850	41.600	42.850	44.100	43.250	41.900	254.550	1st place, gold medalist(s)

Individual Finals

Athlete	Event	Apparatus						Total	Rank
Athlete	Event	F	PH	R	V	PB	HB	Total	Rank
James Hall	All-around	13.450	14.250	13.300	13.800	14.500	13.600	82.900	2nd place, silver medalist(s)
Jake Jarman	All-around	14.000	13.350	13.300	15.300	14.100	13.400	83.450	1st place, gold medalist(s)

Athlete	Apparatus	Score	Rank
Jake Jarman	Floor	14.666	1st place, gold medalist(s)
Giarnni Regini-Moran	Floor	13.966	3rd place, bronze medalist(s)
Joe Fraser	Pommel horse	14.833	1st place, gold medalist(s)
James Hall	Pommel horse	13.433	5
Joe Fraser	Rings	14.100	4
Courtney Tulloch	Rings	14.400	1st place, gold medalist(s)
Jake Jarman	Vault	14.916	1st place, gold medalist(s)
Giarnni Regini-Moran	Vault	14.633	2nd place, silver medalist(s)
Joe Fraser	Parallel bars	15.000	1st place, gold medalist(s)
Giarnni Regini-Moran	Parallel bars	14.733	2nd place, silver medalist(s)
Joe Fraser	Horizontal bar	12.266	7
James Hall	Horizontal bar	13.900	5

Women
Team Final & Individual Qualification

Athlete	Event	Apparatus				Total	Rank
Athlete	Event	V	UB	BB	F	Total	Rank
Ondine Achampong	Team	14.150	13.750 Q	13.300	12.550 Q	53.750	2 Q
Georgia-Mae Fenton	Team	13.150	14.000 Q	13.300 Q	12.450	52.900	4
Claudia Fragapane	Team	–	–	~~11.650~~	~~12.450~~	—N/a	
Alice Kinsella	Team	13.900	13.650	13.450 Q	13.450 Q	54.450	1 Q
Kelly Simm	Team	~~12.800~~	~~11.800~~	–	–	—N/a	
Total	Team	41.200	41.400	40.050	38.450	161.100	1st place, gold medalist(s)

Individual Finals

Athlete	Event	Apparatus				Total	Rank
Athlete	Event	V	UB	BB	F	Total	Rank
Ondine Achampong	All-around	13.900	13.250	12.500	13.350	53.000	2nd place, silver medalist(s)
Alice Kinsella	All-around	13.850	13.700	11.000	12.050	50.600	4

Athlete	Apparatus	Score	Rank
Ondine Achampong	Uneven bars	13.433	4
Georgia-Mae Fenton	Uneven bars	13.900	1st place, gold medalist(s)
Georgia-Mae Fenton	Balance beam	12.733	5
Alice Kinsella	Balance beam	12.933	4
Ondine Achampong	Floor	13.033	2nd place, silver medalist(s)
Alice Kinsella	Floor	13.366	1st place, gold medalist(s)

=== Rhythmic ===
Team Final & Individual Qualification

Athlete	Event	Apparatus				Total	Rank
Athlete	Event	Hoop	Ball	Clubs	Ribbon	Total	Rank
Marfa Ekimova	Team	28.950 Q	27.800 Q	26.000	26.000 Q	108.750	4 Q
Alice Leaper	Team	26.700 Q	26.300	26.700	25.600 Q	105.300	6 Q
Saffron Severn	Team	25.600	~~24.700~~	27.400 Q	~~25.400~~	103.100	12
Total	Team	81.250	54.100	80.100	51.600	267.050	3rd place, bronze medalist(s)

Individual Finals

Athlete	Event	Apparatus				Total	Rank
Athlete	Event	Hoop	Ball	Clubs	Ribbon	Total	Rank
Marfa Ekimova	All-around	28.850	28.000	28.350	27.100	112.300	1st place, gold medalist(s)
Alice Leaper	All-around	26.300	26.900	25.700	24.700	103.600	11

Athlete	Apparatus	Score	Rank
Marfa Ekimova	Hoop	27.750	4
Alice Leaper	Hoop	25.700	8
Marfa Ekimova	Ball	28.600	4
Saffron Severn	Clubs	25.450	8
Marfa Ekimova	Ribbon	25.700	6
Alice Leaper	Ribbon	25.300	7

== Hockey ==
As host nation, England automatically qualified for both the men's and women's tournaments.

Detailed fixtures were released on 9 March 2022. The women's squad was announced on 14 June 2022, followed by the majority of the men's squad on 12 July 2022. On 24 July, it was announced that Ian Sloan and Rhys Smith had been brought into the squad to replace the injured Nick Park and Liam Sanford.

Summary

Key:

- FT = After full time
- P = Match decided by penalty-shootout

Team	Event	Preliminary round					Semifinal	Final / BM / PM	
Team	Event	Opposition Result	Opposition Result	Opposition Result	Opposition Result	Rank	Opposition Result	Opposition Result	Rank
England men	Men's tournament	Ghana; W 6–0	Wales; W 4–2	India; D 4–4	Canada; W 11–2	2 Q	Australia; L 2–3	South Africa; W 6–3	3rd place, bronze medalist(s)
England women	Women's tournament	Ghana; W 12–0	Canada; W 1–0	India; W 3–1	Wales; W 5–0	1 Q	New Zealand; W 2–0^{P} FT: 0–0	Australia; W 2–1	1st place, gold medalist(s)

=== Men's tournament ===
Squad

- James Albery (co-vc)
- Liam Ansell
- Nick Bandurak
- Will Calnan
- David Condon
- Brendan Creed
- David Goodfield
- Chris Griffiths
- James Mazarelo (gk)
- Ollie Payne (gk)
- Phil Roper
- Stuart Rushmere
- Ian Sloan
- Rhys Smith
- Tom Sorsby
- Zachary Wallace (c)
- Jack Waller (co-vc)
- Samuel Ward

Group play

Pos	Team	Pld	W	D	L	GF	GA	GD	Pts	Qualification
1	India	4	3	1	0	27	5	+22	10	Semi-finals
2	England (H)	4	3	1	0	25	8	+17	10	Semi-finals
3	Wales	4	2	0	2	14	10	+4	6	Fifth place match
4	Canada	4	0	1	3	4	25	−21	1	Seventh place match
5	Ghana	4	0	1	3	2	24	−22	1	Ninth place match

Source: Birmingham 2022
Rules for classification: 1) points; 2) number of wins; 3) goal difference; 4) goals scored; 5) head-to-head results.
(H) Hosts

29 July 2022
19:00

England	6–0	Ghana
Bandurak 8', 30', 45'; Roper 27'; Calnan 39'; Condon 51'	Report

Umpires:
Tim Bond (NZL)
Ilanggo Kanabathu (MAS)

31 July 2022
14:00

England	4–2	Wales
Ward 2'; Bandurak 41', 57'; Roper 53'	Report	Prosser 19'; Carson 52'

Umpires:
Steve Rogers (AUS)
Sean Rapaport (RSA)

1 August 2022
16:00

England	4–4	India
Ansell 42'; Bandurak 47', 53'; Roper 51'	Report	Lalit 3'; Mandeep 13', 22'; Harmanpreet 46'

Umpires:
David Tomlinson (NZL)
Sean Rapaport (RSA)

4 August 2022
16:00

Canada	2–11	England
Guraliuk 11', 56'	Report	Roper 2', 45'; Bandurak 16', 38', 50', 59'; Ansell 19'; Wallace 24', 44'; Rushmere 54'; Ward 55'

Umpires:
Deepak Joshi (IND)
Steve Rogers (AUS)

Semi-finals

6 August 2022
20:15

Australia	3–2	England
Govers 27'; Anderson 44'; Beale 50'	Report	Roper 12'; Wallace 19'

Umpires:
Sean Rapaport (RSA)
David Tomlinson (NZL)

Bronze medal match

8 August 2022
09:00

England	6–3	South Africa
Smith 19'; Ansell 24'; Ward 25'; Roper 40', 50'; Wallace 59'	Report	Guise-Brown 18'; M. Cassiem 22'; Ntuli 30'

Umpires:
Tyler Klenk (CAN)
Steve Rogers (AUS)

=== Women's tournament ===
Squad

- Giselle Ansley
- Grace Balsdon
- Fiona Crackles
- Sophie Hamilton
- Sabbie Heesh (gk)
- Maddie Hinch (gk)
- Tessa Howard
- Holly Hunt
- Hannah Martin
- Shona McCallin
- Lily Owsley
- Hollie Pearne-Webb (c)
- Flora Peel
- Izzy Petter
- Ellie Rayer
- Anna Toman
- Laura Unsworth
- Lily Walker

Group play

Pos	Team	Pld	W	D	L	GF	GA	GD	Pts	Qualification
1	England (H)	4	4	0	0	21	1	+20	12	Semi-finals
2	India	4	3	0	1	12	6	+6	9	Semi-finals
3	Canada	4	2	0	2	14	5	+9	6	Fifth place match
4	Wales	4	1	0	3	5	12	−7	3	Seventh place match
5	Ghana	4	0	0	4	1	29	−28	0	Ninth place match

Source: Birmingham 2022
Rules for classification: 1) points; 2) number of wins; 3) goal difference; 4) goals scored; 5) head-to-head results.
(H) Hosts

30 July 2022
16:00

England	12–0	Ghana
Balsdon 10', 19', 47'; Martin 15', 34', 48'; Ansley 27'; Hunt 28'; Howard 33'; Owsley 38'; Toman 48'; Unsworth 54'	Report

Umpires:
Wanri Venter (RSA)
Rhiannon Murrie (AUS)

31 July 2022
19:00

Canada	0–1	England
	Report	Toman 20'

Umpires:
Cookie Tan (SGP)
Aleisha Neumann (AUS)

2 August 2022
14:00

India	1–3	England
Vandana 60'	Report	Ansley 3'; Howard 40'; Martin 52'

Umpires:
Wanri Venter (RSA)
Cookie Tan (SGP)

4 August 2022
11:00

England	5–0	Wales
Balsdon 18', 34', 58'; Martin 28'; Ansley 54'	Report

Umpires:
Wanri Venter (RSA)
Binish Hayat (PAK)

Semi-finals

5 August 2022
18:00

England	0–0	New Zealand
	Report
Penalties
Howard (penalty shoot-out missed); Owsley (penalty shoot-out missed); Petter (penalty shoot-out scored); Martin (penalty shoot-out scored)	2–0	(penalty shoot-out missed) Ralph; (penalty shoot-out missed) Tynan; (penalty shoot-out missed) Doar; (penalty shoot-out missed) Shannon

Umpires:
Aleisha Neumann (AUS)
Wanri Venter (RSA)

Gold medal match

7 August 2022
15:00

England	2–1	Australia
Hunt 22'; Howard 26'	Report	Malone 60'

Umpires:
Amber Church (NZL)
Wanri Venter (RSA)

== Judo ==
On 24 June 2022, Team England announced its squad of fourteen judoka. Lele Nairne was subsequently called up to replace Lucy Renshall, who withdrew owing to injury.

Men

Athlete	Event	Round of 32	Round of 16	Quarterfinals	Semifinals	Repechage	Final/BM		
Athlete	Event	Opposition Result	Opposition Result	Opposition Result	Opposition Result	Opposition Result	Opposition Result	Rank	
Samuel Hall	-60 kg	Bye	Solomon (NRU); W 10–0	Rabbitt (WAL); W 10–0	Christodoulides (CYP); W 10–0	—N/a		MacKenzie (ENG); L 0–10	2nd place, silver medalist(s)
Ashley Mackenzie	-60 kg	Bye	Iddris (GHA); W 10–0	Munro (SCO); W 1s1–0s2	Katz (AUS); W 1s2–0s1	—N/a		Hall (ENG); W 10–0	1st place, gold medalist(s)
Daniel Powell	-73 kg	—N/a	Munnings (BAH); W 10–0	Matos (MOZ); W 10–0	Bensted (AUS); W 10–0s1	—N/a		Njie (GAM); W 10–0	1st place, gold medalist(s)
Lachlan Moorhead	-81 kg	—N/a	Muritala (NGR); W 10–0s3	Nikolic (AUS); W 10s2–0s1	Elnahas (CAN); W 11s2–1s1	—N/a		Gauthier Drapeau (CAN); W 10s1–0	1st place, gold medalist(s)
Jamal Petgrave	-90 kg	—N/a		Metois (VAN); W 10–0	Breytenbach (RSA); W 10s1–0	—N/a		Feuillet (MRI); W 1s1–0s2	1st place, gold medalist(s)
Harry Lovell-Hewitt	-100 kg	—N/a	Ahiavor (GHA); W 10–0	Deswal (IND); W 10–0s3	Elnahas (CAN); L 0s3–10	—N/a		Ozcicek-Takagi (AUS); W 10–0s3	3rd place, bronze medalist(s)
Rhys Thompson	-100 kg	—N/a	Bezzina (MLT); W 1s1–0s2	Ozcicek-Takagi (AUS); W 10s1–1s3	Reyes (CAN); L 0–10	—N/a		Takayawa (FIJ); W 10-0s1	3rd place, bronze medalist(s)

Women

Athlete	Event	Round of 16	Quarterfinals	Semifinals	Repechage	Final/BM		
Athlete	Event	Opposition Result	Opposition Result	Opposition Result	Opposition Result	Opposition Result	Rank	
Amy Platten	-48 kg	Bye	Esposito (MLT); W 10–0	Whitebooi (RSA); L 0–1	—N/a	Boniface (MAW); W 10–0	3rd place, bronze medalist(s)	
Lele Nairne	-57 kg	Bye	Breytenbach (RSA); W 1–0s2	Deguchi (CAN); L 0–1	—N/a	Wilson (SCO); L 0s3–10s1	5	
Acelya Toprak	-57 kg	Bye	Wilson (SCO); W 10s1–0s3	Legentil (MRI); W 10s1–0s2	—N/a	Deguchi (CAN); L 0s2–10s2	2nd place, silver medalist(s)	
Gemma Howell	-63 kg	Bye	Hacker-Jones (WAL); W 10–0s2	Haecker (AUS); W 10s1–0s2	—N/a		Beauchemin-Pinard (CAN); L 0s2–10s2	2nd place, silver medalist(s)
Kelly Petersen-Pollard	-70 kg	—N/a	Bye	Drysdale Daley (JAM); L 0s2-10	—N/a		Asonye (NGR); W 10–0	3rd place, bronze medalist(s)
Katie-Jemima Yeats-Brown	-70 kg	—N/a	Takayawa (FIJ); W 10–0s1	Coughlan (AUS); L 0s3-10	—N/a		Hawkes (NIR); W 10–0s1	3rd place, bronze medalist(s)
Emma Reid	-78 kg	—N/a	Tytler (SCO); W 10–0	de Villiers (NZL); W 1s1–0	—N/a		Powell (WAL); W 1s1–0	1st place, gold medalist(s)

== Lawn bowls ==
On 28 January 2022, Team England announced the selection of the lawn bowls team (16 players, 2 directors) to compete in Birmingham. Amy Pharaoh competed at the 2002 Commonwealth Games in Manchester the last time the event was held in England and returns to the team after a twelve-year absence.

Men

Athlete	Event	Group Stage					Quarterfinal	Semifinal	Final / BM	
Athlete	Event	Opposition Score	Opposition Score	Opposition Score	Opposition Score	Rank	Opposition Score	Opposition Score	Opposition Score	Rank
Jamie Walker	Singles	Olivier (NAM); W 21–12	Simpson (JAM); W 21–8	Naiseruvati (FIJ); W 21–11	Muin (MAS); L 8–21	2 Q	Wilson (AUS); L 16–21	Did not advance		
Sam Tolchard; Jaime Walker	Pairs	Malaysia; W 21–10	Falkland Islands; W 47–5	Cook Islands; W 20–7	India; L 15–18	1 Q	Jersey; W 19–6	Scotland; W 19–13	Wales; L 18–19	2nd place, silver medalist(s)
Nick Brett; Jamie Chestney; Louis Ridout	Triples	Malaysia; W 13–12	South Africa; W 22–14	Canada; W 36–8	—N/a	1 Q	Jersey; W 16–11	Wales; W 15–5	Australia; W 14–12	1st place, gold medalist(s)
Nick Brett; Jamie Chestney; Louis Ridout; Sam Tolchard	Fours	Cook Islands; W 25–10	Fiji; W 23–8	India; W 20–11	—N/a	1 Q	Malaysia; W 16–10	India; L 12–13	Bronze medal match Wales; W 17–12	3rd place, bronze medalist(s)

Women

Athlete	Event	Group Stage					Quarterfinal	Semifinal	Final / BM	
Athlete	Event	Opposition Score	Opposition Score	Opposition Score	Opposition Score	Rank	Opposition Score	Opposition Score	Opposition Score	Rank
Amy Pharaoh	Singles	Ahmad (MAS); L 11–21	Lim (SGP); W 21–3	Inch (NZL); L 18–21	Buckingham (NIU); W 21–16	3	Did not advance			
Amy Pharaoh; Sophie Tolchard	Pairs	Northern Ireland; W 14–13	Fiji; W 19–13	Scotland; W 19–7	—N/a	1Q	India; W 18–14	New Zealand; W 19–12	Australia; L 18–19	2nd place, silver medalist(s)
Natalie Chestney; Sian Honnor; Jamie-Lea Winch	Triples	Niue; W 26–12	India; W 24–11	New Zealand; L 14–18	—N/a	1 Q	Northern Ireland; W 25–11	Cook Islands; W 23–11	Malaysia; W 17–9	1st place, gold medalist(s)
Natalie Chestney; Sian Honnor; Sophie Tolchard; Jamie-Lea Winch	Fours	India; W 18–9	Canada; W 23–16	Cook Islands; W 19–7	—N/a	1 Q	South Africa; L 11–12	Did not advance		

Para-sport

Athlete	Event	Group Stage						Semifinal	Final / BM	
Athlete	Event	Opposition Score	Opposition Score	Opposition Score	Opposition Score	Opposition Score	Rank	Opposition Score	Opposition Score	Rank
Craig Bowler; Kieran Rollings	Men's pairs B6–8	Scotland; L 12–23	New Zealand; W 19–11	Australia; W 13–12	Wales; W 12–11	South Africa; W 16–13	2 Q	Australia; L 4–17	Bronze medal match New Zealand; W 13–4	3rd place, bronze medalist(s)
Gill Platt; Michelle White	Women's pairs B6–8	South Africa; L 13–17	New Zealand; W 12–10	Scotland; W 19–7	Australia; W 22–5	—N/a	1 Q	Scotland; L 10–17	Bronze medal match South Africa; L 7–16	4
Chris Turnbull directed by Mark Wherry; Alison Yearling directed by Sue Wherry	Mixed pairs B2-3	Wales; W 18–9	Australia; L 11–14	South Africa; W 14–8	Scotland; L 9–17	New Zealand; L 8–19	4 Q	Scotland; L 6–21	Bronze medal match Australia; W 14–11	3rd place, bronze medalist(s)

== Netball ==
As host nation, England automatically qualified for the tournament.

Partial fixtures were announced in November 2021, then updated with the remaining qualifiers in March 2022. The squad was announced on 20 June 2022. On 17 July it was announced that Imogen Allison would replace the injured Beth Cobden.

Summary

Team	Event	Group stage						Semifinal	Final / BM / Cl.	
Team	Event	Opposition Result	Opposition Result	Opposition Result	Opposition Result	Opposition Result	Rank	Opposition Result	Opposition Result	Rank
England women	Women's tournament	Trinidad and Tobago; W 74–22	Malawi; W 66–41	Northern Ireland; W 71–27	Uganda; W 56–35	New Zealand; W 54–44	1 Q	Australia; L 51–60	New Zealand; L 48–55	4

Squad

- Imogen Allison
- Eleanor Cardwell
- Jade Clarke
- Sophie Drakeford-Lewis
- Stacey Francis-Bayman
- Layla Guscoth
- Jo Harten (vc)
- Helen Housby
- Laura Malcolm
- Geva Mentor
- Natalie Metcalf (c)
- Eboni Usoro-Brown

Group stage

Pos	Team	Pld	W	D	L	GF	GA	GD	Pts	Qualification
1	England (H)	5	5	0	0	321	169	+152	10	Semi-finals
2	New Zealand	5	4	0	1	325	188	+137	8	Semi-finals
3	Uganda	5	3	0	2	256	206	+50	6	Classification matches
4	Malawi	5	2	0	3	258	262	−4	4	Classification matches
5	Northern Ireland	5	1	0	4	155	299	−144	2	Classification matches
6	Trinidad and Tobago	5	0	0	5	136	327	−191	0	Classification matches

Source: Birmingham 2022
(H) Hosts

29 July 2022; 12:00	Report	England	74–22	Trinidad and Tobago	National Exhibition Centre; Umpires: Elizna Van Den Berg; Kate Wright
29 July 2022; 12:00	Report	Cardwell 30/30 (100%); Drakeford-Lewis 3/4 (75%); Harten 25/30 (83%); Housby 16/24 (67%)		Cooper 10/13 (77%); Noel 12/15 (80%)	National Exhibition Centre; Umpires: Elizna Van Den Berg; Kate Wright

30 July 2022; 14:00	Report	England	66–41	Malawi	National Exhibition Centre; Umpires: Tara Warner; Gareth Fowler
30 July 2022; 14:00	Report	Cardwell 31/33 (94%); Harten 21/25 (84%); Housby 14/18 (78%)		Chimaliro 4/5 (80%); Kumwenda 18/21 (86%); Mvula 19/22 (86%)	National Exhibition Centre; Umpires: Tara Warner; Gareth Fowler

1 August 2022; 18:00	Report	England	71–27	Northern Ireland	National Exhibition Centre; Umpires: Alison Harrison; Bronwen Adams
1 August 2022; 18:00	Report	Cardwell 40/45 (89%); Drakeford-Lewis 11/12 (92%); Housby 20/20 (100%)		Bowman 8/11 (73%); Crosbie 8/12 (67%); Magee 9/13 (69%); McGrath 2/2 (100%)	National Exhibition Centre; Umpires: Alison Harrison; Bronwen Adams

2 August 2022; 18:00	Report	England	56–35	Uganda	National Exhibition Centre; Umpires: Tara Warner; Ken Metekingi
2 August 2022; 18:00	Report	Cardwell 27/30 (90%); Harten 14/17 (82%); Housby 15/15 (100%)		Cholhok 6/7 (86%); Eyaru 12/14 (86%); Nassanga 9/12 (75%); Proscovia 8/9 (89%)	National Exhibition Centre; Umpires: Tara Warner; Ken Metekingi

4 August 2022; 21:00	Report	New Zealand	44–54	England	National Exhibition Centre; Umpires: Joshua Bowring; Bronwen Adams
4 August 2022; 21:00	Report	Nweke 23/29 (79%); Selby-Rickit 13/13 (100%); Wilson 8/9 (89%)		Cardwell 26/29 (90%); Harten 5/6 (83%); Housby 23/26 (88%)	National Exhibition Centre; Umpires: Joshua Bowring; Bronwen Adams

Semi-finals

6 August 2022; 14:30	Report	England	51–60	Australia	National Exhibition Centre; Umpires: Gareth Fowler; Angela Armstrong-Lush
6 August 2022; 14:30	Report	Cardwell 22/24 (92%); Harten 16/17 (94%); Housby 13/14 (93%)		Bueta 43/44 (98%); Wood 17/20 (85%)	National Exhibition Centre; Umpires: Gareth Fowler; Angela Armstrong-Lush

Bronze medal match

7 August 2022; 13:30	Report	New Zealand	55–48	England	National Exhibition Centre; Umpires: Joshua Bowring; Bronwen Adams
7 August 2022; 13:30	Report	Nweke 44/48 (92%); Selby-Rickit 11/14 (79%)		Cardwell 31/34 (91%); Harten 4/5 (80%); Housby 13/17 (76%)	National Exhibition Centre; Umpires: Joshua Bowring; Bronwen Adams

== Para powerlifting ==
On 25 May 2022, British Weight Lifting announced the seven para powerlifters who have been selected to represent England in Birmingham. On 27 July 2022, it was announced that Louise Sugden had withdrawn from the Games due to injury.

Athlete	Event	Result	Rank
Mark Swan	Men's lightweight	145.5	2nd place, silver medalist(s)
Matthew Harding	Men's lightweight	123.7	6
Liam McGarry	Men's heavyweight	116.4	5
Olivia Broome	Women's lightweight	100.0	2nd place, silver medalist(s)
Zoe Newson	Women's lightweight	102.2	1st place, gold medalist(s)
Rebecca Bedford	Women's heavyweight	80.8	6

== Rugby sevens ==
As host nation, England automatically qualified for both the men's and women's tournaments. Both squads were confirmed on 6 July 2022.

Summary

Team	Event	Preliminary Round				Quarterfinal / CQ	Semifinal / CS	Final / BM / CF	
Team	Event	Opposition Result	Opposition Result	Opposition Result	Rank	Opposition Result	Opposition Result	Opposition Result	Rank
England men's	Men's tournament	Samoa; L 0–34	Sri Lanka; W 47–19	New Zealand; L 0–20	3	Classification quarterfinal Jamaica; W 45–7	Classification semifinal Wales; W 14–10	9th place final Uganda; W 31–17	9
England women's	Women's tournament	Sri Lanka; W 57–0	Canada; L 19–26	New Zealand; L 7–38	3	—N/a	Classification semifinal South Africa; W 36–0	5th place final Scotland; W 29–5	5

=== Men's tournament ===
Squad

- Jamie Adamson
- Api Bavadra
- Tom Bowen
- Blake Boyland
- Jamie Barden
- Max Clementson
- Alex Davis (c)
- Tom Emery
- Will Homer
- Hayden Hyde
- Charlton Kerr
- Calum Randle
- Freddie Roddick

Pool A

Pos	Team	Pld	W	D	L	PF	PA	PD	Pts	Qualification
1	New Zealand	3	3	0	0	102	22	+80	9	Advance to Quarter-finals
2	Samoa	3	2	0	1	99	19	+80	7	Advance to Quarter-finals
3	England	3	1	0	2	47	77	−30	5	Advance to classification Quarter-finals
4	Sri Lanka	3	0	0	3	24	154	−130	3	Advance to classification Quarter-finals

Source: Birmingham2022
Rules for classification: 1) Points; 2) Head-to-head result; 3) Point difference; 4) Points scored.

29 July 2022
11:34

England	0–38	Samoa
	Report	Try: Onosai (3) 2' c, 6' m, 7' m Maliko 5' c Falaniko 12' m Con: Matavao (2/5) 3', 5'; Purcell (0/1); Cards: Leitufia (yellow card) 11'

Coventry Stadium, Coventry
Referee: Jordan Way (Australia)

29 July 2022
19:42

England	47–19	Sri Lanka
Try: Kerr (2) 1' m, 6' c Adamson (2) 4' c, 14' c Bowen 6' c Homer 8' c Emery 13' c Con: Roddick (5/6) 5', 6', 7', 9', 14'; Emery (1/1) 13'; Cards: Adamson (yellow card) 7'; Roddick (yellow card) 11'	Report	Try: Sooriyabandara 7' c A. Ratwatte 8' c Kudachchige 10' m Con: Sooriyabandara (1/2) 7'; N. Ratwatte (1/1) 8'

Coventry Stadium, Coventry
Referee: Finlay Brown (Scotland)

30 July 2022
11:34

New Zealand	20–0	England
Try: Webber 6' m Tangitau 8' m Clark (2) 11' m, 14' m Con: Rokolisoa (0/2); McGarvey-Black (0/2)	Report

Coventry Stadium, Coventry
Referee: Morné Ferreira (South Africa)

9-16 Quarterfinal

30 July 2022
18:14

England	45–7	Jamaica
Try: Bowen (2) 1' m, 4' m Emery 6' c Roddick 7' c Hyde 8' c Bavadra 10' c Homer 12' c Con: Emery (4/6) 6', 7', 8', 11'; Homer (1/1) 12'	Report	Try: Bush 8' c Con: Adamson (1/1) 10'

Coventry Stadium, Coventry
Referee: Jordan Way (Australia)

9-12 semifinal

31 July 2022
11:14

England	14–10	Wales
Try: Homer 1' c Bavadra 4' c Con: Roddick (2/2) 1', 4'	Report	Try: Williams (2) 12' m, 14' m Con: Swannack (0/2); Cards: Morgan (yellow card) 8'

Coventry Stadium, Coventry
Referee: Talal-Azmat Chaudhry (Canada)

9th place match

31 July 2022
18:44

England	31–17	Uganda
Try: Adamson (3) 3' c, 8' c, 9' m Emery 8' c Bowen 11' m Con: Roddick (1/1) 3'; Emery (2/4) 8', 8'	Report	Try: Ofoyrwoth 5' m Kisiga 12' c Arinaitwe 14' m Con: Wokorach (1/3) 12'

Coventry Stadium, Coventry
Referee: Tevita Rokovereni (Fiji)

=== Women's tournament ===
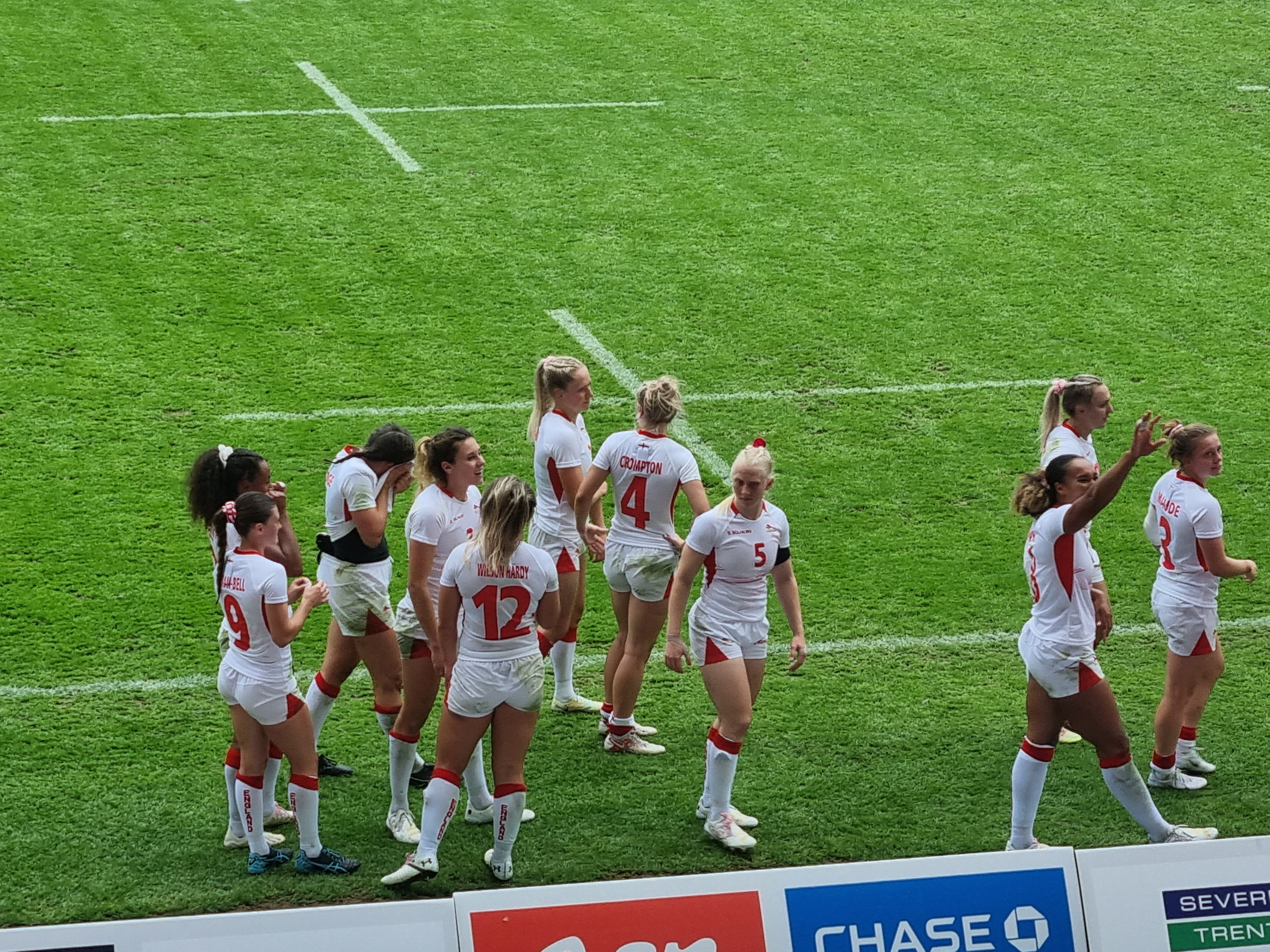
Team England at the 2022 Commonwealth Games.

Squad

- Ellie Boatman
- Abbie Brown (co-c)
- Heather Cowell
- Grace Crompton
- Merryn Doidge
- Megan Jones (co-c)
- Alicia Maude
- Isla Norman-Bell
- Celia Quansah
- Jade Shekells
- Lauren Torley
- Emma Uren
- Amy Wilson-Hardy

Pool A

Pos	Team	Pld	W	D	L	PF	PA	PD	Pts	Qualification
1	New Zealand	3	3	0	0	143	14	+129	9	Semi-finals
2	Canada	3	2	0	1	107	64	+43	7	Semi-finals
3	England	3	1	0	2	83	64	+19	5	Classification semi-finals
4	Sri Lanka	3	0	0	3	0	191	−191	3	Classification semi-finals

Source: Birmingham2022
Rules for classification: 1) Points; 2) Head-to-head result; 3) Point difference; 4) Points scored.

29 July 2022
09:44

England	57–0	Sri Lanka
Try: Boatman (4) 1' c, 2' c, 4' c, 7' m Wilson-Hardy 6' c Maude (2) 8' m, 10' c Torley 12' c Crompton 14' m Con: Maude (5/7) 1', 3', 5', 6', 11'; Torley (1/1) 12'; Norman-Bell (0/1)	Report

Coventry Stadium, Coventry
Referee: Selica Winiata (New Zealand)

29 July 2022
18:36

Canada	26–19	England
Try: Wardley 5' c Farella (2) 7', 8' c Scurfield 9' c Con: Apps (3/4) 5', 9', 10'	Report	Try: Boatman 1' m Crompton 11' c Cowell 14' c Con: Jones (1/2) 14'; Norman-Bell (1/1) 12'; Cards: Boatman (yellow card) 8'

Coventry Stadium, Coventry
Referee: Lauren Jenner (New Zealand)

30 July 2022
10:06

New Zealand	38–7	England
Try: Blyde (2) 3' c, 6' c Hirini 4' c Kaka 10' m Hotham 12' c Pouri-Lane 14' m Con: Nathan-Wong (3/3) 3', 5', 7'; Pouri-Lane (1/3) 13'	Report	Try: Boatman 7' c Con: Norman-Bell (1/1) 7'

Coventry Stadium, Coventry
Referee: Hollie Davidson (Scotland)

5-8 semifinal

30 July 2022
17:30

England	36–0	South Africa
Try: Cowell 2' c Uren 3' m Doidge 8' m Norman-Bell (2) 11' c, 12' m Wilson-Hardy 14' c Con: Maude (1/3) 2'; Norman-Bell (2/3) 11', 14'	Report

Coventry Stadium, Coventry
Referee: Selica Winiata (New Zealand)

5th place match

31 July 2022
18:22

England	29–5	Scotland
Try: Quansah 2' c Boatman 8' m Crompton (2) 10' m, 14' m Jones 12' c Con: Norman-Bell (1/2) 2'; Jones (1/3) 13'	Report	Con: Rollie 8' m Cards: Thomson (0/1)

Coventry Stadium, Coventry
Referee: Ashleigh Murray-Pretorius (South Africa)

== Squash ==
On 6 May 2022, Team England announced its squad of nine players.

Singles

Athlete	Event	Round of 64	Round of 32	Round of 16	Quarterfinals	Semifinals	Final	
Athlete	Event	Opposition Score	Opposition Score	Opposition Score	Opposition Score	Opposition Score	Opposition Score	Rank
Patrick Rooney	Men's singles	Bye	Jervis (CAY); W 3–0	Stewart (SCO); L 2–3	Did not advance			
Adrian Waller	Men's singles	Bye	Kelly (CAY); W 3–0	Binnie (JAM); W 3–0	Coll (NZL); L 0–3	Did not advance		
James Willstrop	Men's singles	Bye	Navas (GIB); W 3–0	Iqbal (PAK); W 3–0	Stewart (SCO); W 3–2	Makin (WAL); L 0–3	Bronze medal match Ghosal (IND); L 0–3	4
Georgina Kennedy	Women's singles	Bye	Kuruppa (SRI); W 3–0	Bunyan (CAN); W 3–0	Arnold (MAS); W 3–0	Perry (ENG); W 3–1	Naughton (CAN); W 3–1	1st place, gold medalist(s)
Sarah-Jane Perry	Women's singles	Bye	Pitcairn (CAY); W 3–0	Chan (MAS); W 3–0	Whitlock (WAL); W 3–0	Kennedy (ENG); L 1–3	Bronze medal match King (NZL); W 3–2	3rd place, bronze medalist(s)
Lucy Turmel	Women's singles	Bye	Alarcos (PNG); W 3–0	Turnbull (AUS); W 3–1	King (NZL); L 1–3	Did not advance		

Doubles

Athlete	Event	Round of 32	Round of 16	Quarterfinals	Semifinals	Final	
Athlete	Event	Opposition Score	Opposition Score	Opposition Score	Opposition Score	Opposition Score	Rank
Adrian Waller; Daryl Selby	Men's doubles	Bye	Hung & Kamal (MAS); W 2–1	Baillargeon & Sachvie (CAN); W 2–0	Lobban & Stewart (SCO); W 2–1	Willstrop & James (ENG); L 1–2	2nd place, silver medalist(s)
James Willstrop; Declan James	Men's doubles	Bye	Sultana & Engerer (MLT); W 2–0	Pilley & Dowling (AUS); W 2–0	Yow & Yuen (MAS); W 2–1	Waller & Selby (ENG); W 2–1	1st place, gold medalist(s)
Sarah-Jane Perry; Alison Waters	Women's doubles	Bye	Pitcairn & West (CAY); W 2–0	Aitken & Adderley (SCO); W 2–0	Arnold & Azman (MAS); W 2–1	King & Landers-Murphy (NZL); L 0–2	2nd place, silver medalist(s)
Georgina Kennedy; Lucy Turmel	Women's doubles	Bye	Haydon & Turnbull (AUS); W 2–0	King & Landers-Murphy (NZL); L 0–2	Did not advance		
Adrian Waller; Alison Waters	Mixed doubles	Bye	Best & Cumberbatch (BAR); W 2–0	Evans & Makin (WAL); W 2–1	Lobban & Pilley (AUS); W 2–0	Coll & King (NZL); L 0–2	2nd place, silver medalist(s)
Patrick Rooney; Georgina Kennedy	Mixed doubles	Sultana & Sultana (MLT); W 2–0	Grinham & Alexander (AUS); L 0–2	Did not advance			

== Swimming ==
On 27 January 2022, Team England announced its initial squad of ten swimmers, including double Tokyo 2020 champions Adam Peaty, James Guy and Tom Dean. With the addition of twenty-four swimmers and fourteen para-swimmers (the latter qualifying via the World Para Swimming World Rankings for performances between 31 December 2020 and 18 April 2022), the full squad of forty-eight competitors was confirmed on 11 May 2022.

On 13 July 2022 it was announced that Max Litchfield would be replaced by Toby Robinson.

Men

Athlete	Event	Heat		Semifinal		Final	
Athlete	Event	Time	Rank	Time	Rank	Time	Rank
Adam Barrett	50 m freestyle	22.89	13 Q	22.86	16	Did not advance	
Lewis Burras	50 m freestyle	22.09	1 Q	21.92	2 Q	21.68	2nd place, silver medalist(s)
Ben Proud	50 m freestyle	22.44	3 Q	21.63	1 Q	21.36	1st place, gold medalist(s)
Michael Jones	50 m freestyle S7	—N/a				30.95	4
William Perry	50 m freestyle S7	—N/a				33.18	8
Lewis Burras	100 m freestyle	49.70	8 Q	49.96	13	Did not advance	
Tom Dean	100 m freestyle	48.61	2 Q	47.83	2 Q	47.89	2nd place, silver medalist(s)
Jacob Whittle	100 m freestyle	49.26	12 Q	48.82	7 Q	48.61	6
Tom Dean	200 m freestyle	1:47.19	3 Q	—N/a		1:45.41	2nd place, silver medalist(s)
Cameron Kurle	200 m freestyle	1:48.94	12	—N/a		Did not advance	
Joe Litchfield	200 m freestyle	1:48.44	8 Q	—N/a		1:48.87	8
Jordan Catchpole	200 m freestyle S14	—N/a				1:56.37	4
Reece Dunn	200 m freestyle S14	—N/a				1:56.42	5
Thomas Hamer	200 m freestyle S14	—N/a				1:57.99	6
Toby Robinson	400 m freestyle	3:52.21	10	—N/a		Did not advance	
Luke Turley	400 m freestyle	3:49.61	5 Q	—N/a		3:48.50	5
Toby Robinson	1500 m freestyle	15:33.59	3 Q	—N/a		15:14.84	4
Luke Turley	1500 m freestyle	15:35.65	4 Q	—N/a		15:12.78	3rd place, bronze medalist(s)
Joe Litchfield	50 m backstroke	25.80	14 Q	25.44	9	Did not advance	
Luke Greenbank	100 m backstroke	54.55	4 Q	54.23	5 Q	54.29	5
James McFadzen	100 m backstroke	55.75	14 Q	55.50	12	Did not advance	
Brodie Williams	100 m backstroke	54.49	2 Q	54.00	2 Q	53.91	2nd place, silver medalist(s)
Luke Greenbank	200 m backstroke	1:56.33	1 Q	—N/a		1:56.98	5
Jay Lelliott	200 m backstroke	2:00.65	8 Q	—N/a		2:01.64	8
Brodie Williams	200 m backstroke	1:57.88	2 Q	—N/a		1:56.40	1st place, gold medalist(s)
Greg Butler	50 m breaststroke	27.80	10 Q	27.68	7 Q	27.98	7
Adam Peaty	50 m breaststroke	27.10	1 Q	27.03	2 Q	26.76	1st place, gold medalist(s)
James Wilby	50 m breaststroke	27.74	8 Q	27.65	5 Q	27.72	6
Greg Butler	100 m breaststroke	1:01.59	11 Q	1:00.90	11	Did not advance	
Adam Peaty	100 m breaststroke	59.82	1 Q	59.02	1 Q	59.88	4
James Wilby	100 m breaststroke	1:00.62	4 Q	59.85	3 Q	59.25	1st place, gold medalist(s)
Greg Butler	200 m breaststroke	2:15.01	7 Q	—N/a		2:13.06	5
James Wilby	200 m breaststroke	2:11.76	3 Q	—N/a		2:08.59	2nd place, silver medalist(s)
Adam Barrett	50 m butterfly	23.98	13 Q	23.59	8 Q	23.57	7
Jacob Peters	50 m butterfly	23.64	4 Q	23.51	4 Q	23.29	5
Ben Proud	50 m butterfly	23.46	2 Q	23.06	1 Q	22.81	1st place, gold medalist(s)
James Guy	100 m butterfly	52.49	6 Q	51.82	3	51.40	2nd place, silver medalist(s)
Jamie Ingram	100 m butterfly	52.17	2 Q	52.27	8	52.33	8
Jacob Peters	100 m butterfly	52.18	3 Q	52.23	7	52.18	6
James Hollis	100 m butterfly S10	—N/a				58.55	3rd place, bronze medalist(s)
James Guy	200 m butterfly	1:58.30	7 Q	—N/a		1:56.77	3rd place, bronze medalist(s)
Jay Lelliott	200 m butterfly	1:57.93	5 Q	—N/a		1:58.13	7
Mason Wilby	200 m butterfly	1:57.97	6 Q	—N/a		1:57.12	6
Tom Dean	200 m individual medley	1:59.86	1 Q	—N/a		1:57.01	2nd place, silver medalist(s)
James McFadzen	200 m individual medley	2:01.44	8 Q	—N/a		1:59.87	7
Brodie Williams	400 m individual medley	DNS		—N/a		Did not advance	
Lewis Burras; Jacob Whittle; James Guy; Tom Dean; Edward Mildred; Joe Litchfield; Jamie Ingram; Cameron Kurle	4 × 100 m freestyle relay	3:16.93	2 Q	—N/a		3:11.73	2nd place, silver medalist(s)
James Guy; Jacob Whittle; Joe Litchfield; Tom Dean	4 × 200 m freestyle relay	—N/a				7:07.50	2nd place, silver medalist(s)
Brodie Williams; James Wilby; James Guy; Tom Dean; Luke Greenbank; Greg Butler; Jacob Peters; Jacob Whittle	4 × 100 m medley relay	3:35.88	2 Q	—N/a		3:31.80	1st place, gold medalist(s)

Women

Athlete	Event	Heat		Semifinal		Final	
Athlete	Event	Time	Rank	Time	Rank	Time	Rank
Isabella Hindley	50 m freestyle	25.31	7 Q	25.36	8 Q	25.25	6
Anna Hopkin	50 m freestyle	24.77	4 Q	24.66	4 Q	24.83	5
Rebecca Redfern	50 m freestyle S13	—N/a				29.56	5
Hannah Russell	50 m freestyle S13	—N/a				27.67	2nd place, silver medalist(s)
Freya Anderson	100 m freestyle	54.83	2 Q	54.15	5 Q	54.00	5
Isabella Hindley	100 m freestyle	55.83	10 Q	55.60	9	Did not advance	
Anna Hopkin	100 m freestyle	55.50	7 Q	53.96	4 Q	53.57	4
Alice Tai	100 m freestyle S9	1:09.72	7 Q	—N/a		1:07.10	6
Freya Anderson	200 m freestyle	1:57.59	4 Q	—N/a		1:56.83	4
Tamryn van Selm	200 m freestyle	2:01.50	13	—N/a		Did not advance	
Jessica-Jane Applegate	200 m freestyle S14	—N/a				2:08.56	2nd place, silver medalist(s)
Louise Fiddes	200 m freestyle S14	—N/a				2:11.22	3rd place, bronze medalist(s)
Poppy Maskill	200 m freestyle S14	—N/a				2:13.54	4
Freya Anderson	400 m freestyle	DNS		—N/a		Did not advance	
Freya Colbert	400 m freestyle	4:16.31	10	—N/a		Did not advance	
Tamryn van Selm	400 m freestyle	DNS		—N/a		Did not advance	
Lauren Cox	50 m backstroke	28.30	6 Q	27.91	6 Q	27.61	4
Isabella Hindley	50 m backstroke	29.99	15 Q	29.75	13	Did not advance	
Lauren Cox	100 m backstroke	1:00.77	5 Q	1:00.36	4 Q	1:00.17	5
Alice Tai	100 m backstroke S8	—N/a				1:13.64	1st place, gold medalist(s)
Imogen Clark	50 m breaststroke	30.26	2 Q	30.24	2 Q	30.02	2nd place, silver medalist(s)
Sarah Vasey	50 m breaststroke	31.65	10 Q	31.47	10	Did not advance	
Imogen Clark	100 m breaststroke	1:08.99	9 Q	1;08.60	10	Did not advance	
Molly Renshaw	100 m breaststroke	1:07.54	3 Q	1:07.42	5 Q	1:07.36	4
Sarah Vasey	100 m breaststroke	1:09.62	12 Q	1:09,05	12	Did not advance	
Grace Harvey	100 m breaststroke SB6	—N/a				1:43.29	2nd place, silver medalist(s)
Maisie Summers-Newton	100 m breaststroke SB6	—N/a				1:32.72	1st place, gold medalist(s)
Molly Renshaw	200 m breaststroke	2:25.06	3 Q	—N/a		2:24.00	4
Abbie Wood	200 m breaststroke	2:26.80	6 Q	—N/a		Withdrawn	
Holly Hibbott	100 m butterfly	59.33	10 Q	58.97	8 Q	59.28	7
Holly Hibbott	200 m butterfly	2:10.49	4 Q	—N/a		2:09.92	5
Laura Stephens	200 m butterfly	2:09.60	2 Q	—N/a		2:07.90	2nd place, silver medalist(s)
Alicia Wilson	200 m individual medley	2:14.89	8 Q	—N/a		2:14.08	7
Abbie Wood	200 m individual medley	2:13.24	4 Q	—N/a		2:10.68	3rd place, bronze medalist(s)
Freya Colbert	400 m individual medley	4:42.64	4 Q	—N/a		4:39.80	4
Anna Hopkin; Abbie Wood; Isabella Hindley; Freya Anderson	4 × 100 m freestyle relay	—N/a				3:36.62	2nd place, silver medalist(s)
Freya Colbert; Tamryn van Selm; Abbie Wood; Freya Anderson	4 × 200 m freestyle relay	—N/a				7:57.11	3rd place, bronze medalist(s)
Lauren Cox; Molly Renshaw; Laura Stephens; Anna Hopkin	4 × 100 m medley relay	—N/a				3:59.44	3rd place, bronze medalist(s)

Mixed

Athlete	Event	Heat		Final	
Athlete	Event	Time	Rank	Time	Rank
Lewis Burras; Tom Dean; Freya Anderson; Anna Hopkin; Edward Mildred; Jacob Whittle; Isabella Hindley; Abbie Wood	4 × 100 m freestyle relay	3:28.03	2 Q	3:22.45	2nd place, silver medalist(s)
Lauren Cox; James Wilby; James Guy; Freya Anderson; Alicia Wilson; Greg Butler; Edward Mildred; Abbie Wood	4 × 100 m medley relay	3:51.08	2 Q	3:44.03	3rd place, bronze medalist(s)

== Table tennis ==
As host nation, England automatically qualified full teams for both the men's and women's events; parasport players had to qualify via the ITTF Para Table Tennis Rankings (as they were on 1 May 2022).

A team of thirteen players (including those in parasport events) was announced on 7 June 2022. On 22 July 2022, it was announced that Emily Bolton would replace the injured Mollie Patterson.

Singles

Athletes	Event	Group stage				Round of 32	Round of 16	Quarterfinal	Semifinal	Final / BM	
Athletes	Event	Opposition Score	Opposition Score	Opposition Score	Rank	Opposition Score	Opposition Score	Opposition Score	Opposition Score	Opposition Score	Rank
Paul Drinkhall	Men's singles	Bye				Khawaja (PAK); W 4–0	Chew (SGP); W 4–0	Aruna (NGR); W 4–1	Kamal (IND); L 2–4	Bronze medal match Gnanasekaran (IND); L 3–4	4
Liam Pitchford	Men's singles	Bye				Wong (MAS); W 4–1	Pang (SGP); W 4–0	Shetty (IND); W 4–1	Gnanasekaran (IND); W 4–1	Kamal (IND); L 1–4	2nd place, silver medalist(s)
Sam Walker	Men's singles	Bye				Farley (BAR); W 4–0	Hazin (CAN); W 4–0	Gnansekaran (IND); L 2–4	Did not advance		
Daniel Bullen	Men's singles C3–5	Ogunkunle (NGR); L 0–3	Wyndham (SLE); W 3–1	Alagar (IND); L 1–3	3	—N/a			Did not advance		
Jack Hunter Spivey	Men's singles C3–5	Chen (AUS); W 3–0	Sule (NGR); L 2–3	Mudassar (CAN); W 3–0	2 Q	—N/a			Ogunkunle (NGR); W 3–0	Suke (NGR); W 3–1	1st place, gold medalist(s)
Ross Wilson	Men's singles C8–10	Olufemi (NGR); W 3–0	Lin Ma (AUS); L 0–3	Syed (CAN); W 3–0	2 Q	—N/a			Stacey (WAL); L 1–3	Bronze medal match Agunbiade (NGR); W 3–2	3rd place, bronze medalist(s)
Charlotte Bardsley	Women's singles	Chung (TTO); W 4–0	Meletie (CYP); W 4–1	—N/a	1 Q	Tennison (IND); L 1–4	Did not advance				
Tin-Tin Ho	Women's singles	Bye				Silcock (JEY); W 4–2	Yangzi (AUS); L 0–4	Did not advance			
Maria Tsaptsinos	Women's singles	Nangonzi (UGA); W 4–0	Tee (MAS); L 3–4	—N/a	2	Did not advance					
Sue Bailey	Women's singles C3–5	Patel (IND); L 1–3	Obiora (NGR); W 3–2	Tscharke (AUS); W 3–0	2 Q	—N/a			Patel (IND); L 0–3	Bronze medal match Patel (IND); L 0–3	4
Felicity Pickard	Women's singles C6–10	Olo (SOL); W 3–0	Li Na Lei (AUS); L 0–3	Walker (WAL); W 3–1	2 Q	—N/a			Yang (AUS); L 0–3	Bronze medal match Obazuaye (NGR); L 1–3	4

Doubles

Athletes	Event	Round of 64	Round of 32	Round of 16	Quarterfinal	Semifinal	Final / BM	
Athletes	Event	Opposition Score	Opposition Score	Opposition Score	Opposition Score	Opposition Score	Opposition Score	Rank
Liam Pitchford; Paul Drinkhall	Men's doubles	Bye	Dalgleish & Rumgay (SCO); W 3–1	Knight & Maxwell (BAR); W 3–0	Omeh & Omotayo (NGR); W 3–0	Chew & Poh (SGP); W 3–1	Gnanasekaran & Kamal (IND); W 3–2	1st place, gold medalist(s)
Sam Walker; Tom Jarvis	Men's doubles	Bye	Farley & Riley (BAR); W 3–0	Coghill & Nathoo (RSA); W 3–0	Achanta & Gnanasekaran (IND); L 0–3	Did not advance		
Charlotte Bardsley; Emily Bolton	Women's doubles	Bye	Nakawala & Nangonzi (UGA); W 3–0	Feng & Zeng (SGP); L 0–3	Did not advance			
Tin-Tin Ho; Maria Tsaptsinos	Women's doubles	Bye	Mou & Sultana (BAN); W 3–0 (WO)	Jee & Lay (AUS); L 1–3	Did not advance			
Tom Jarvis; Charlotte Bardsley	Mixed doubles	Loi & Agari (PNG); W 3–0	Pang & Wong (SGP); W 3–2	Hazin & Fu (CAN); W 3–0	Lum & Jee (AUS); L 0–3	Did not advance		
Liam Pitchford; Tin-Tin Ho	Mixed doubles	Bye	Quek & Zhou (SGP); W 3–2	Ly & Gauthier (CAN); W 3–0	Achanta & Akula (IND); L 2–3	Did not advance		
Sam Walker; Maria Tsaptsinos	Mixed doubles	Evans & Carey (WAL); L 2–3	Did not advance					

Team

Athletes	Event	Group stage				Quarterfinal	Semifinal	Final / BM	
Athletes	Event	Opposition Score	Opposition Score	Opposition Score	Rank	Opposition Score	Opposition Score	Opposition Score	Rank
Liam Pitchford; Paul Drinkhall; Sam Walker; Tom Jarvis	Men's team	Guyana; W 3–0	Fiji; W 3–0	Bangladesh; W 3–0	1 Q	Cyprus; W 3–0	Singapore; L 2–3	Nigeria; W 3–0	3rd place, bronze medalist(s)
Tin-Tin Ho; Maria Tsaptsinos; Charlotte Bardsley; Emily Bolton	Women's team	Singapore; L 0–3	Saint Vincent and the Grenadines; W 3–0	Nigeria; W 3–2	2 Q	Wales; L 0–3	Did not advance		

== Triathlon ==
On 25 January 2022, Team England announced its initial squad of four triathletes, including three of the Tokyo 2020 mixed relay champions.

Based on the World Triathlon Para Rankings of 28 March 2022, a squad of four paratriathletes (plus two guides) was subsequently added. Two triathletes, one paratriathlete and three guides were added to the overall squad on 1 July 2022.

Jonny Brownlee later pulled out of the Games as the result of a wrist injury he sustained in a triathlon the previous month. On 17 July it was announced that Dan Dixon would replace Brownlee.

Individual

Athlete	Event	Swim (750 m)	Trans 1	Bike (20 km)	Trans 2	Run (5 km)	Total	Rank
Sam Dickinson	Men's	8:46	0:59	26:04	0:19	17:32	53:40	19
Dan Dixon	Men's	8:39	0:56	26:14	0:19	15:54	52:02	12
Alex Yee	Men's	8:49	0:50	26.07	0:17	14:31	50:34	1st place, gold medalist(s)
Sophie Coldwell	Women's	9:26	0:58	29:08	0:20	17:14	57:06	4
Sian Rainsley	Women's	9:37	0:55	29:23	0:19	17:40	57:54	12
Georgia Taylor-Brown	Women's	9:25	0:56	28:14	0:20	17:11	56:06	2nd place, silver medalist(s)

Mixed relay

Athlete	Event	Time						Rank
Athlete	Event	Swim (300 m)	Trans 1	Bike (5 km)	Trans 2	Run (2 km)	Total group	Rank
Alex Yee	Mixed relay	3:36	0:48	6:38	0:16	6:09	17:27	—N/a
Sophie Coldwell	Mixed relay	4:19	0:55	7:24	0:19	7:21	20:18	—N/a
Sam Dickinson	Mixed relay	4:04	0:51	6:44	0:17	6:49	18:45	—N/a
Georgia Taylor-Brown	Mixed relay	4:30	0:44	7:17	0:19	7:20	20:10	—N/a
Total	Mixed relay	—N/a					1:16.40	1st place, gold medalist(s)

Paratriathlon

Athlete	Event	Comp.	Swim (750 m)	Trans 1	Bike (20 km)	Trans 2	Run (5 km)	Total	Rank
Iain Dawson; Guide: Duncan Shea-Simonds	Men's PTVI	2:46	14:21	1:26	30:27	0:33	22:35	1:12.08	8
Dave Ellis; Guide: Luke Pollard	Men's PTVI	2:46	9:46	1:07	26:57	0:25	16:38	57.39	1st place, gold medalist(s)
Oscar Kelly; Guide: Charlie Harding	Men's PTVI	2:46	10:22	1:01	34:18	0:26	17:45	1:06.38	5
Katie Crowhurst; Guide: Jessica Fullagar	Women's PTVI	3:19	11:19	1:10	30:21	0:32	23:51	1:10.32	1st place, gold medalist(s)
Melissa Reid; Guide: Grace France	Women's PTVI	DNS							

== Weightlifting ==
As host nation, England automatically qualified 1 entry in each weight category (8 per gender). On 25 May 2022, British Weight Lifting announced the fourteen weightlifters who have been selected to represent England in Birmingham. On 17 July 2022, it was announced that Sarah Davies had been added to the England squad.

Men

Athlete	Event	Snatch (kg)		Clean & Jerk (kg)		Total (kg)	Rank
Athlete	Event	Result	Rank	Result	Rank	Total (kg)	Rank
Ben Hickling	55 kg	93	4	119	4	212	4
Jaswant Shergill	67 kg	114	6	146	4	260	4
Jack Oliver	73 kg	131	5	156	8	287	6
Chris Murray	81 kg	144	1	181	1	325 GR	1st place, gold medalist(s)
Cyrille Tchatchet	96 kg	158	2	~~188~~	NM	DNF	
Andrew Griffiths	109 kg	159	5	187	5	346	6
Gordon Shaw	+109 kg	167	3	195	7	362	5

Women

Athlete	Event	Snatch (kg)		Clean & Jerk (kg)		Total (kg)	Rank
Athlete	Event	Result	Rank	Result	Rank	Total (kg)	Rank
Noorin Gulam	49 kg	73	6	88	6	161	6
Fraer Morrow	55 kg	89	2	109	3	198	3rd place, bronze medalist(s)
Jessica Gordon Brown	59 kg	86	3	111	2	197	2nd place, silver medalist(s)
Zoe Smith	64 kg	88	4	122	2	210	4
Sarah Davies	71 kg	103 CR GR	1	126 GR	1	229 GR	1st place, gold medalist(s)
Deborah Alawode	76 kg	93	5	119	5	212	4
Emily Sweeney	87 kg	~~88~~	NM	–	–	DNF	
Emily Campbell	+87 kg	124 GR	1	162 CR GR	1	286 CR GR	1st place, gold medalist(s)

== Wrestling ==
On 28 April 2022, Team England announced its squad of nine wrestlers. Myroslav Dykun later withdrew and was replaced by Syerus Eslami as of 10 June 2022.

Key:

- VT - Victory by Fall.
- PP - Decision by Points - the loser with technical points.
- PO - Decision by Points - the loser without technical points.

Repechage Format

Athlete	Event	Round of 16	Quarterfinal	Semifinal	Repechage	Final / BM	
Athlete	Event	Opposition Result	Opposition Result	Opposition Result	Opposition Result	Opposition Result	Rank
Harvey Ridings	Men's -57 kg	Asad (PAK); L 0–10 (VSU)	Did not advance				
George Ramm	Men's -65 kg	Rezaeifar (AUS); W 3–0 (VPO)	Afrikaner (NAM); W 7–0 (VPO)	Punia (IND); L 0–10 (VSU)	—N/a	Bronze medsl match Bingham (NRU); W 11–0 (VSU)	3rd place, bronze medalist(s)
Charlie Bowling	Men's -74 kg	Demeritte (BAH); W 10–0 (VSU)	van Zijl (RSA); W 4–2 (VPO1)	Sihag (IND); L 1–12 (VSU2)	—N/a	Bronze medal match John (NGR); L 0–10 (VSU)	5
Syerus Eslami	Men's -86 kg	Choiras (CYP); W 6–4 (VPO1)	Lessing (RSA); L 0–10 (VSU)	Did not advance			
Mandhir Kooner	Men's -125 kg	Lehauli (TGA); W 13–3 (VSU)	Mohamed Bundu (SLE); W 4–1 (VFA)	Anwar (PAK); L 0–5 (VFA)	—N/a	Bronze medal match Marie (MRI); W 4–0 (VFA)	3rd place, bronze medalist(s)
Kelsey Barnes	Women's -62 kg	—N/a	Malik (IND); L 0–10 (VFA)	—N/a		Bronze medal match Etane Ngolle (CMR); L 4–9 (VPO1)	5
Sarah Clossick	Women's -68 kg	Bye	Ford (NZL); L 0–10 (VSU)	Did not advance			
Chloe Spiteri	Women's -68 kg	DNS	Did not advance				
Georgina Nelthorpe	Women's -76 kg	—N/a	Vilbrun (MRI); W 6–0 (VFA)	Rueben (NGR); L 1–6 (VPO1)	—N/a	Bronze medal match Koroma (SLE); W 4–0 (VFA)	3rd place, bronze medalist(s)
