= Athletics at the 2022 Commonwealth Games – Women's 100 metres (T34) =

Women's 100 metres (T34) at the 2022 Commonwealth Games
- Venue: Alexander Stadium
- Dates: 2 August
- Competitors: 6 from 2 nations
- Winning time: 16.84

Medalists
gold medal	Hannah Cockroft	England
silver medal	Kare Adenegan	England
bronze medal	Fabienne André	England

The women's 100 metres (T34) at the 2022 Commonwealth Games, as part of the athletics programme, took place in the Alexander Stadium on 2 August 2022.

== Records ==
Prior to this competition, the existing world and Games records were as follows:

Records T33
World record	Shelby Watson (GBR)	19.89	Nottwil, Switzerland	26 May 2016
Records T34
World record	Hannah Cockroft (GBR)	16.39	Tokyo, Japan	29 August 2021

== Schedule ==
The schedule was as follows:

Date	Time	Round
Tuesday 2 August 2022	21:54	Final

All times are British Summer Time (UTC+1)

== Results ==
=== Final ===
The medals were determined in the final.

Wind: +1.7m/s

Rank	Lane	Name	Sport class	Result	Notes
1st place, gold medalist(s)	2	Hannah Cockroft (ENG)	T34	16.84	GR
2nd place, silver medalist(s)	4	Kare Adenegan (ENG)	T34	17.79	SB
3rd place, bronze medalist(s)	6	Fabienne André (ENG)	T34	19.58	
4	3	Robyn Lambird (AUS)	T34	19.68	
5	5	Sarah Clifton-Bligh (AUS)	T33	22.71	GR
6	7	Rosemary Little (AUS)	T33	23.05	PB
