= Gymnastics at the 2022 Commonwealth Games – Men's floor =

Men's floor at the 2022 Commonwealth Games
- Venue: Arena Birmingham
- Dates: 29 July 2022 (qualification); 1 August 2022 (final)
- Competitors: 8 from 6 nations
- Winning score: 14.666

Medalists
gold medal	Jake Jarman	England
silver medal	Félix Dolci	Canada
bronze medal	Giarnni Regini-Moran	England

The Men's floor gymnastics competition at the 2022 Commonwealth Games in Birmingham, England was held on 1 August 2022 at Arena Birmingham.

== Schedule ==
The schedule was as follows:

All times are British Summer Time (UTC+1)

Date	Time	Round
Friday 29 July 2022	09:08	Qualification
Monday 1 August 2022	13:00	Final

== Results ==
=== Qualification ===
Qualification for this apparatus final was determined within the team final. The results are as follows:

Rank	Gymnast	Difficulty	Execution	Penalty	Total	Notes
1	Giarnni Regini-Moran (ENG)	5.900	8.050	-0.1	13.850	Q
2	Eamon Montgomery (NIR)	5.900	7.850		13.750	Q
3	Jake Jarman (ENG)	6.300	7.450		13.750	Q
4	Emil Barber (WAL)	5.700	7.950		13.650	Q
5	Félix Dolci (CAN)	6.000	7.750	-0.3	13.450	Q
6	Joe Cemlyn-Jones (WAL)	5.400	8.000		13.400	Q
7	Clay Mason Stephens (AUS)	5.700	7.700		13.400	Q
8	Frank Baines (SCO)	4.600	8.700		13.300	Q
9	James Hall (ENG)	5.900	7.350		13.250	–
10	Jacob Edwards (WAL)	5.700	7.500		13.200	–
11	Jesse Moore (AUS)	5.300	7.850	-0.3	12.850	R1
12	Daniel Lee (JEY)	5.100	7.750		12.850	R2
13	Terry Tay (SGP)	5.500	7.700	-0.4	12.800	R3
14	Mikhail Koudinov (NZL)	5.200	7.550		12.750	
15	Marios Georgiou (CYP)	5.400	7.300		12.700	
16	Kenji Tamane (CAN)	5.100	7.450		12.550	
17	Joshua Cook (WAL)	5.400	7.200		12.600	
18	Chris Kaji (CAN)	5.100	7.550		12.650	
19	Samuel Dick (NZL)	5.000	7.600	-0.1	12.500	
20	Ethan Dick (NZL)	4.900	7.500		12.400	
21	Muhammad Khaalid Mia (RSA)	5.100	7.300		12.400	
22	William Fu-Allen (NZL)	5.100	7.250		12.350	
23	Sokratis Pilakouris (CYP)	4.400	7.800		12.200	
24	James Bacueti (AUS)	5.800	6.400	-0.1	12.100	
25	David Weir (SCO)	5.100	6.750		11.850	
26	Georgios Angonas (CYP)	4.800	7.400	-0.4	11.800	
27	Ali Kader Haque (BAN)	4.500	7.400	-0.1	11.800	
28	Hamish Carter (SCO)	5.600	6.500	-0.3	11.800	
29	Pavel Karnejenko (SCO)	5.000	6.650		11.650	
30	Yogeshwar Singh (IND)	5.600	5.700		11.300	
31	Ruchira Fernando (SRI)	3.900	7.300		11.200	
32	Michalis Chari (CYP)	5.400	5.950	-0.3	11.050	
33	Muhammad Sharul Aimy (MAS)	5.300	5.600		10.900	
34	Karthik Adapa (CAY)	4.000	6.600		10.600	
35	Jayson Rampersad (CAN)	4.700	6.050	-0.3	10.450	
36	Igor Magalhães (CAY)	3.500	6.700		10.200	
37	Abu Saeed Rafi (BAN)	3.700	6.350		10.050	
38	Shishir Ahmed (BAN)	3.500	5.900	-0.3	9.100	
39	Muhammad Afzal (PAK)	2.900	5.500		8.400	
40	Satyajit Mondal (IND)	5.200	2.950	-0.3	7.850	
	Joe Fraser (ENG)	DNS				
	Hansa Kumarasinghege (SRI)	DNS				

=== Final ===
The results are as follows:

Rank	Gymnast	Difficulty	Execution	Penalty	Total
1st place, gold medalist(s)	Jake Jarman (ENG)	6.300	8.366		14.666
2nd place, silver medalist(s)	Félix Dolci (CAN)	5.900	8.266		14.166
3rd place, bronze medalist(s)	Giarnni Regini-Moran (ENG)	5.700	8.266		13.966
4	Emil Barber (WAL)	5.700	8.100		13.800
5	Eamon Montgomery (NIR)	5.900	7.766		13.666
6	Frank Baines (SCO)	4.600	8.966		13.566
7	Clay Mason Stephens (AUS)	5.600	6.766		12.366
8	Joe Cemlyn-Jones (WAL)	5.100	6.566	-0.3	11.366
