= Athletics at the 2022 Commonwealth Games – Men's pole vault =

Men's pole vault at the 2022 Commonwealth Games
- Venue: Alexander Stadium
- Dates: 6 August
- Competitors: 9 from 5 nations
- Winning height: 5.70

Medalists
| gold medal | Kurtis Marschall | Australia |
| silver medal | Adam Hague | England |
| bronze medal | Harry Coppell | England |

The men's pole vault at the 2022 Commonwealth Games, as part of the athletics programme, took place in the Alexander Stadium on 6 August 2022.

== Records ==
Prior to this competition, the existing world and Games records were as follows:

| World record | Armand Duplantis (SWE) | 6.21 m | Eugene, United States | 24 July 2022 |
| Commonwealth record | Dmitri Markov (AUS) | 6.05 m | Edmonton, Canada | 9 August 2001 |
| Games record | Steven Hooker (AUS) | 5.80 m | Melbourne, Australia | 24 March 2006 |

== Schedule ==
The schedule was as follows:

| Date | Time | Round |
|---|---|---|
| Tuesday 6 August 2022 | 19:10 | Final |

All times are British Summer Time (UTC+1)

== Results ==
=== Final ===
The medals were determined in the final.

| Rank | Name | 4.65 | 4.80 | 4.95 | 5.05 | 5.15 | 5.25 | 5.35 | 5.40 | 5.45 | 5.50 | 5.55 | 5.60 | 5.65 | 5.70 | 5.81 | Result | Notes |
|---|---|---|---|---|---|---|---|---|---|---|---|---|---|---|---|---|---|---|
| 1st place, gold medalist(s) | Kurtis Marschall (AUS) | – | – | – | – | – | – | – | o | – | xxo | – | o | – | xo | xxx | 5.70 | |
| 2nd place, silver medalist(s) | Adam Hague (ENG) | – | – | – | – | – | xo | o | – | o | – | xxo | – | xxx | | | 5.55 | =SB |
| 3rd place, bronze medalist(s) | Harry Coppell (ENG) | – | – | – | – | – | – | o | – | – | xo | – | x– | xx | | | 5.50 | |
| 4 | Nikandros Stylianou (CYP) | – | – | o | – | xo | o | xxx | | | | | | | | | 5.25 | |
| 5 | Owen Heard (ENG) | – | – | – | o | – | xxo | x– | xx | | | | | | | | 5.25 | |
| 6 | Christos Tamanis (CYP) | – | – | o | – | xxo | xxx | | | | | | | | | | 5.15 | |
| 7 | Angus Armstrong (AUS) | – | – | xo | xxx | | | | | | | | | | | | 4.95 | |
| 8 | Glen Quayle (IOM) | o | xo | xo | xxx | | | | | | | | | | | | 4.95 | |
| | Micky Ferdinand (LCA) | xxx | | | | | | | | | | | | | | | NM | |
