= Gymnastics at the 2022 Commonwealth Games – Men's vault =

Men's vault at the 2022 Commonwealth Games
- Venue: Arena Birmingham
- Dates: 29 July 2022 (qualification); 2 August 2022 (final)
- Competitors: 8 from 7 nations
- Winning score: 14.916

Medalists
gold medal	Jake Jarman	England
silver medal	Giarnni Regini-Moran	England
bronze medal	James Bacueti	Australia

The Men's vault gymnastics competition at the 2022 Commonwealth Games in Birmingham, England was held on 2 August 2022 at Arena Birmingham.

== Schedule ==
The schedule was as follows:

All times are British Summer Time (UTC+1)

Date	Time	Round
Friday 29 July 2022	09:08	Qualification
Tuesday 2 August 2022	13:00	Final

== Results ==
=== Qualification ===
Qualification for this apparatus final was determined within the team final. The results are as follows:

Rank	Gymnast	Vault 1	Vault 2	Total	Notes
1	Jake Jarman (ENG)	14.750	15.200	14.975	Q
2	Giarnni Regini-Moran (ENG)	15.000	14.350	14.675	Q
3	Félix Dolci (CAN)	14.250	14.450	14.350	Q
4	James Bacueti (AUS)	14.600	14.000	14.300	Q
5	Emil Barber (WAL)	14.150	14.200	14.175	Q
6	Ewan McAteer (NIR)	14.150	13.750	13.950	Q
7	Muhammad Sharul Aimy (MAS)	14.000	13.900	13.950	Q
8	Samuel Dick (NZL)	13.850	13.150	13.500	Q
9	Satyajit Mondal (IND)	13.400	13.550	13.475	R1
10	Georgios Angonas (CYP)	13.800	13.050	13.425	R2
11	Joe Cemlyn-Jones (WAL)	13.150	13.650	13.400	R3
12	Ali Kader Haque (BAN)	13.700	13.050	13.375	
13	Terry Tay (SGP)	13.750	12.950	13.350	
14	Yogeshwar Singh (IND)	13.000	12.900	12.950	
15	David Weir (SCO)	12.950	12.550	12.750	
16	Abu Saeed Rafi (BAN)	11.950	12.450	12.200	
17	Shishir Ahmed (BAN)	11.950	11.350	11.650	
18	Muhammad Afzal (PAK)	10.550	10.200	10.375	

=== Final ===
The results are as follows:

Rank	Name	D Score	E Score	Pen.	Score 1	D Score	E Score	Pen.	Score 2	Total
Rank	Name	Vault 1				Vault 2				Total
1st place, gold medalist(s)	Jake Jarman (ENG)	5.600	9.033		14.633	6.000	9.300	0.100	15.200	14.916
2nd place, silver medalist(s)	Giarnni Regini-Moran (ENG)	5.600	9.200		14.800	5.200	9.266		14.466	14.633
3rd place, bronze medalist(s)	James Bacueti (AUS)	5.600	8.866		14.466	5.600	8.800	0.300	14.100	14.283
4	Félix Dolci (CAN)	5.200	9.366		14.566	5.200	8.033		13.233	13.899
5	Samuel Dick (NZL)	4.800	9.100		13.900	5.200	8.466		13.666	13.783
6	Ewan McAteer (NIR)	5.200	9.000		14.200	5.200	8.100		13.300	13.750
7	Muhammad Sharul Aimy (MAS)	5.200	8.966	0.300	13.866	5.200	8.433	0.100	13.533	13.699
8	Emil Barber (WAL)	5.200	8.000	0.300	12.900	5.200	7.966		13.166	13.033
