= Daniel Dixon (triathlete) =

English triathlete (born 2002)

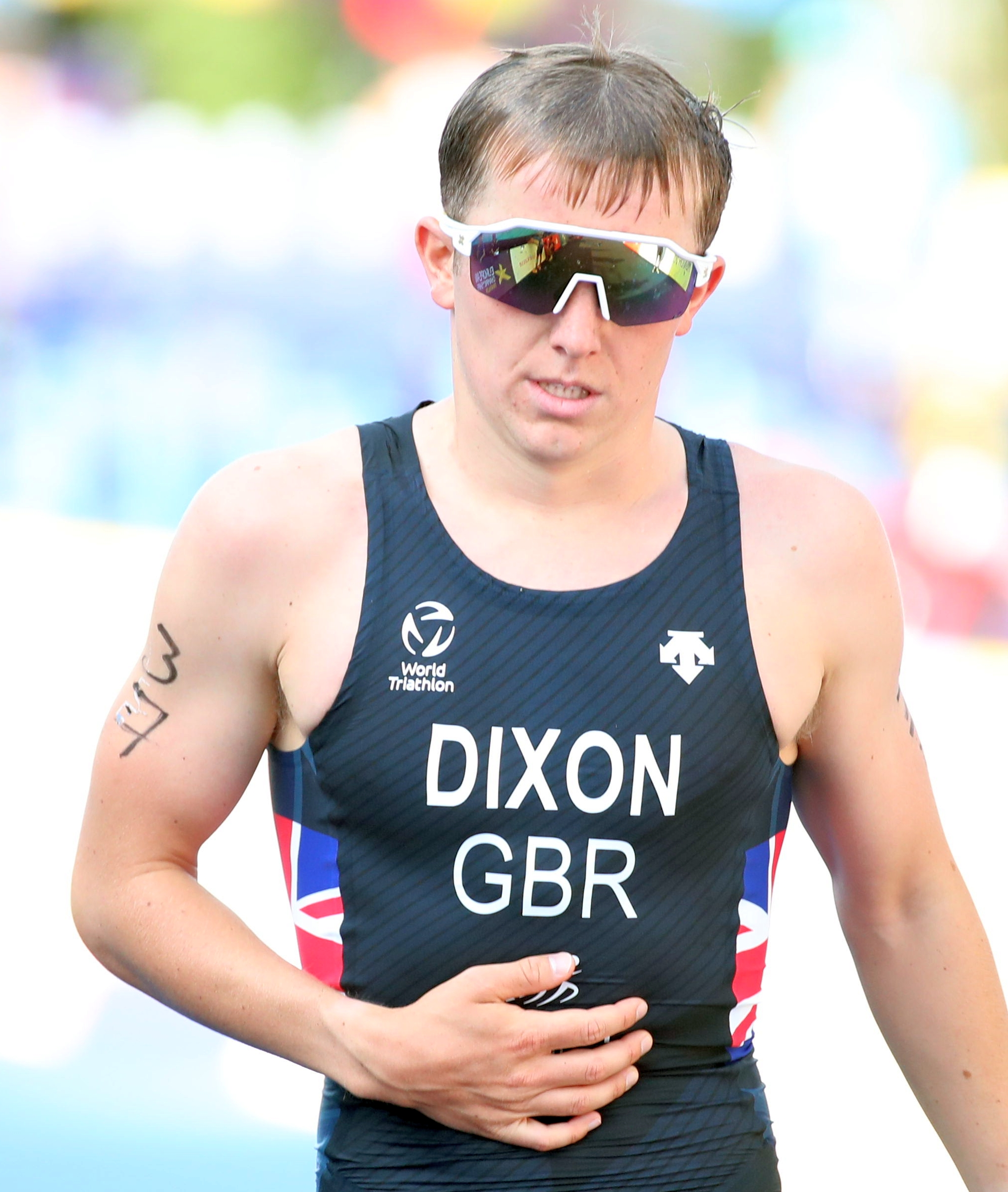
- Daniel Dixon finishing in 12th place at the common wealth games

Personal information
- Full name: Daniel Dixon
- Nickname: Dan
- Nationality: British (English)
- Born: 14 May 2002 (age 24) Ulgham, Morpeth

Sport
- Country: England
- Sport: Triathlon

Daniel Dixon (born 14 May 2002) is an English international triathlete and has represented England at the Commonwealth Games.

== Biography ==
Dixon was named British Elite Champion in 2021. In 2022, he was selected for the 2022 Commonwealth Games in Birmingham where he competed in men's event, finishing in 12th place. Dixon was born in Newcastle Upon Tyne on the 14th May 2002.
