= Joseph Ellis (hammer thrower) =

Athlete

Personal information
- Nationality: British (English)
- Born: 10 April 1996 (age 29) United States

Sport
- Sport: Athletics
- Event: hammer throw

Joseph Ellis (born 10 April 1996) is a United States born and based English international athlete. He has represented England at the Commonwealth Games.

== Biography ==
Ellis was educated at Eastlake High School and the University of Michigan. In May 2022, he recorded a personal best throw of 74.52 metres.

In 2022, he was selected for the men's hammer throw event at the 2022 Commonwealth Games in Birmingham.
