= Australia at the 2022 Commonwealth Games =

- Flag of Australia
- CG code: AUS
- CGA: Commonwealth Games Australia
- Website: commonwealthgames.com.au

in Birmingham, England 28 July 2022 – 8 August 2022
- Competitors: 430 (199 men and 231 women) in 21 sports
- Flag bearers (opening): Eddie Ockenden; Rachael Grinham
- Flag bearer (closing): Melissa Wu
- Medals Ranked 1st: Gold 67 Silver 57 Bronze 56 Total 180

Commonwealth Games appearances (overview)
- 1930; 1934; 1938; 1950; 1954; 1958; 1962; 1966; 1970; 1974; 1978; 1982; 1986; 1990; 1994; 1998; 2002; 2006; 2010; 2014; 2018; 2022; 2026; 2030

Australia competed at the 2022 Commonwealth Games held in Birmingham, England. It was Australia's 22nd appearance at the Commonwealth Games, having competed at every Games since their inception in 1930.

Olympic medallist in field hockey Eddie Ockenden and former squash world champion Rachael Grinham were the country's flagbearers during the Opening Ceremony. Five-time Commonwealth Games medalist Melissa Wu was the flagbearer at the Closing Ceremony after her gold medal in the Women’s 10m Platform Synchronised Diving.

== Administration ==
Chef de Mission - Petria Thomas

General Managers - Anna Meares, Sharelle McMahon, Katrina Webb

Chief Operating Officer - Tim Mahon

== Medallists ==
Medal	Name	Sport	Event	Date
1st place, gold medalist(s)	Leigh Hoffman; Matthew Richardson; Matthew Glaetzer	Cycling	Men's team sprint	29 July 2022
1st place, gold medalist(s)	Georgia Baker; Sophie Edwards; Chloe Moran; Maeve Plouffe	Cycling	Women's team pursuit	29 July 2022
1st place, gold medalist(s)	Jessica Gallagher; Caitlin Ward (pilot)	Cycling	Women's tandem sprint B	29 July 2022
1st place, gold medalist(s)	Elijah Winnington	Swimming	Men's 400 m freestyle	29 July 2022
1st place, gold medalist(s)	Ariarne Titmus	Swimming	Women's 200 m freestyle	29 July 2022
1st place, gold medalist(s)	Timothy Hodge	Swimming	Men's 100 m backstroke S9	29 July 2022
1st place, gold medalist(s)	Zac Stubblety-Cook	Swimming	Men's 200 m breastroke	29 July 2022
1st place, gold medalist(s)	Kyle Chalmers; William Yang; Emma McKeon; Mollie O'Callaghan; Zac Incerti (heat); Flynn Southam (heat); Meg Harris (heat); Madison Wilson (heat)	Swimming	Mixed 4 × 100 m freestyle relay	29 July 2022
1st place, gold medalist(s)	Madison de Rozario	Athletics	Women's marathon (T54)	30 July 2022
1st place, gold medalist(s)	Jessica Stenson	Athletics	Women's Marathon	30 July 2022
1st place, gold medalist(s)	Katja Dedekind	Swimming	Women's 50 m freestyle S13	30 July 2022
1st place, gold medalist(s)	Madison Wilson; Shayna Jack; Mollie O'Callaghan; Emma McKeon	Swimming	Women's 4 × 100 m freestyle relay	30 July 2022
1st place, gold medalist(s)	Flynn Southam; Zac Incerti; William Yang; Kyle Chalmers; Matthew Temple (heat); Cody Simpson (heat); Elijah Winnington (heat)	Swimming	Men's 4 × 100 m freestyle relay	30 July 2022
1st place, gold medalist(s)	Matthew Richardson	Cycling	Men's sprint	31 July 2022
1st place, gold medalist(s)	Kristina Clonan	Cycling	Women's 500m time trial	31 July 2022
1st place, gold medalist(s)	Georgia Baker	Cycling	Women's points race	31 July 2022
1st place, gold medalist(s)	Georgia Godwin	Gymnastics	Women's individual all-round	31 July 2022
1st place, gold medalist(s)	Jessica Gallagher; Caitlin Ward (pilot)	Cycling	Women's tandem time trial B	31 July 2022
1st place, gold medalist(s)	Australia women's national rugby sevens team: Charlotte Caslick; Lily Dick; Dominique Du Toit; Demi Hayes; Madison Ashby; Tia Hinds; Alysia Lefau-Fakaosilea; Maddison Levi; Teagan Levi; Faith Nathan; Sariah Paki; Jesse Southwell; Sharni Williams	Rugby sevens	Women's tournament	31 July 2022
1st place, gold medalist(s)	Emma McKeon	Swimming	Women's 50 m freestyle	31 July 2022
1st place, gold medalist(s)	Kaylee McKeown	Swimming	Women's 100 m backstroke	31 July 2022
1st place, gold medalist(s)	Madison Wilson; Kiah Melverton; Mollie O'Callaghan; Ariarne Titmus	Swimming	Women's 4 × 200 m freestyle relay	31 July 2022
1st place, gold medalist(s)	Matthew Glaetzer	Cycling	Men's 1km time trial	1 August 2022
1st place, gold medalist(s)	Georgia Godwin	Gymnastics	Women's vault	1 August 2022
1st place, gold medalist(s)	Ellen Ryan	Lawn bowls	Women's singles	1 August 2022
1st place, gold medalist(s)	Tinka Easton	Judo	Women's 52 kg	1 August 2022
1st place, gold medalist(s)	Emma McKeon	Swimming	Women's 50 m butterfly	1 August 2022
1st place, gold medalist(s)	Kyle Chalmers	Swimming	Men's 100 m freestyle	1 August 2022
1st place, gold medalist(s)	Matthew Levy	Swimming	Men's 50 m freestyle S7	1 August 2022
1st place, gold medalist(s)	Kaylee McKeown	Swimming	Women's 200 m backstroke	1 August 2022
1st place, gold medalist(s)	Elijah Winnington; Flynn Southam; Zac Incerti; Mack Horton	Swimming	Men's 4 × 200 m freestyle relay	1 August 2022
1st place, gold medalist(s)	Nina Kennedy	Athletics	Women's pole vault	2 August 2022
1st place, gold medalist(s)	Luke Pople; Lachlin Dalton; Kurt Thompson; Jake Kavanagh	3x3 Basketball	Men's Wheelchair	2 August 2022
1st place, gold medalist(s)	Kate McDonald	Gymnastics	Women's balance beam	2 August 2022
1st place, gold medalist(s)	Aoife Coughlan	Judo	Women's 70 kg	2 August 2022
1st place, gold medalist(s)	Col Pearse	Swimming	Men's 100 m butterfly S10	2 August 2022
1st place, gold medalist(s)	Mollie O'Callaghan	Swimming	Women's 100 m freestyle	2 August 2022
1st place, gold medalist(s)	Ariarne Titmus	Swimming	Women's 800 metre freestyle	2 August 2022
1st place, gold medalist(s)	Elizabeth Dekkers	Swimming	Women's 200 metre butterfly	2 August 2022
1st place, gold medalist(s)	Jasmine Greenwood	Swimming	Women's 200 metre individual medley SM10	2 August 2022
1st place, gold medalist(s)	Kaylee McKeown; Zac Stubblety-Cook; Matthew Temple; Emma McKeon; Mitchell Larkin (heat); Samuel Williamson (heat); Alexandria Perkins (heat); Madison Wilson (heat)	Swimming	Mixed 4 × 100 m medley relay	2 August 2022
1st place, gold medalist(s)	Eileen Cikamatana	Weightlifting	Women's 87 kg	2 August 2022
1st place, gold medalist(s)	Evan O'Hanlon	Athletics	Men's 100m T37/38	3 August 2022
1st place, gold medalist(s)	Ariarne Titmus	Swimming	Women's 400 metre freestyle	3 August 2022
1st place, gold medalist(s)	Samuel Short	Swimming	Men's 1500 metre freestyle	3 August 2022
1st place, gold medalist(s)	Kaylee McKeown; Chelsea Hodges; Emma McKeon; Mollie O'Callaghan	Swimming	Women's 4 × 100 m medley relay	3 August 2022
1st place, gold medalist(s)	Matthew Denny	Athletics	Men's discus throw	4 August 2022
1st place, gold medalist(s)	Madison de Rozario	Athletics	Women's 1500 m (T54)	4 August 2022
1st place, gold medalist(s)	Grace Brown	Cycling	Women's time trial	4 August 2022
1st place, gold medalist(s)	Rohan Dennis	Cycling	Men's time trial	4 August 2022
1st place, gold medalist(s)	Kristina Krstic; Ellen Ryan	Lawn bowls	Women's pairs	6 August 2022
1st place, gold medalist(s)	Jemima Montag	Athletics	Women's 10,000 m walk	6 August 2022
1st place, gold medalist(s)	Alexandra Kiroi-Bogatyreva	Gymnastics	Individual clubs	6 August 2022
1st place, gold medalist(s)	Maddison Keeney; Anabelle Smith	Diving	Women's synchronised 3 m springboard	6 August 2022
1st place, gold medalist(s)	Ollie Hoare	Athletics	Men's 1500 m	6 August 2022
1st place, gold medalist(s)	Yang Qian	Table tennis	Women's singles C6–10	6 August 2022
1st place, gold medalist(s)	Aaron Wilson	Lawn bowls	Men's singles	6 August 2022
1st place, gold medalist(s)	Charli Petrov; Melissa Wu	Diving	Women's synchronised 10 m platform	6 August 2022
1st place, gold medalist(s)	Kurtis Marschall	Athletics	Men's pole vault	6 August 2022
1st place, gold medalist(s)	Georgia Baker	Cycling	Women's road race	7 August 2022
1st place, gold medalist(s)	Kelsey-Lee Barber	Athletics	Women's javelin throw	7 August 2022
1st place, gold medalist(s)	Paul Burnett; Chris McHugh	Beach volleyball	Men's	7 August 2022
1st place, gold medalist(s)	Cassiel Rousseau	Diving	Men's 10 metre platform	7 August 2022
1st place, gold medalist(s)	Maddison Keeney	Diving	Women's 3 metre springboard	7 August 2022
1st place, gold medalist(s)	Australia women's national cricket team: Darcie Brown; Nicola Carey; Ashleigh Gardner; Grace Harris; Rachael Haynes; Alyssa Healy; Jess Jonassen; Alana King; Meg Lanning; Tahlia McGrath; Beth Mooney; Ellyse Perry; Megan Schutt; Annabel Sutherland; Amanda-Jade Wellington	Cricket	Women's tournament	7 August 2022
1st place, gold medalist(s)	Australia national netball team: Sunday Aryang; Kiera Austin; Ash Brazill; Courtney Bruce; Gretel Bueta; Paige Hadley; Sarah Klau; Cara Koenen; Kate Moloney; Liz Watson; Jo Weston; Steph Wood	Netball	Women's tournament	7 August 2022
1st place, gold medalist(s)	Australia men's national field hockey team: Jacob Anderson; Daniel Beale; Joshua Beltz; Tim Brand; Andrew Charter; Matthew Dawson; Johan Durst; Nathan Ephraums; Blake Govers; Jake Harvie; Jeremy Hayward; Tim Howard; Eddie Ockenden; Flynn Ogilvie; Joshua Simmonds; Jake Whetton; Tom Wickham; Aran Zalewski	Hockey	Men's tournament	8 August 2022
2nd place, silver medalist(s)	Samuel Short	Swimming	Men's 400 m freestyle	29 July 2022
2nd place, silver medalist(s)	Kiah Melverton	Swimming	Women's 400 m individual medley	29 July 2022
2nd place, silver medalist(s)	Mollie O'Callaghan	Swimming	Women's 200 m freestyle	29 July 2022
2nd place, silver medalist(s)	Emily Beecroft	Swimming	Women's 100 m freestyle S9	29 July 2022
2nd place, silver medalist(s)	Maeve Plouffe	Cycling	Women's individual pursuit	30 July 2022
2nd place, silver medalist(s)	Georgia Godwin; Emily Whitehead; Romi Brown; Breanna Scott; Kate McDonald	Gymnastics	Women's artistic team all-around	30 July 2022
2nd place, silver medalist(s)	Brendon Smith	Swimming	Men's 400 m individual medley	30 July 2022
2nd place, silver medalist(s)	Emma McKeon	Swimming	Women's 100 m butterfly	30 July 2022
2nd place, silver medalist(s)	Meg Harris	Swimming	Women's 50 m freestyle	31 July 2022
2nd place, silver medalist(s)	Jenna Strauch	Swimming	Women's 200 m breaststroke	31 July 2022
2nd place, silver medalist(s)	Zac Stubblety-Cook	Swimming	Men's 100 m breaststroke	31 July 2022
2nd place, silver medalist(s)	Timothy Hodge	Swimming	Men's 100 m breaststroke SB8	31 July 2022
2nd place, silver medalist(s)	Sam Harding; Luke Harvey (Guide)	Triathlon	Men's PTVI	31 July 2022
2nd place, silver medalist(s)	Thomas Cornish	Cycling	Men's 1km time trial	1 August 2022
2nd place, silver medalist(s)	Carl Healey; Barrie Lester; Benjamin Twist	Lawn bowls	Men's Triples	1 August 2022
2nd place, silver medalist(s)	Kaylee McKeown	Swimming	Women's 200 m individual medley	1 August 2022
2nd place, silver medalist(s)	Holly Barratt	Swimming	Women's 50 m butterfly	1 August 2022
2nd place, silver medalist(s)	Kyle Bruce	Weightlifting	Men's 81 kg	1 August 2022
2nd place, silver medalist(s)	Sarah Cochrane	Weightlifting	Women's 64 kg	1 August 2022
2nd place, silver medalist(s)	Jaydon Page	Athletics	Men's 100 m T47	2 August 2022
2nd place, silver medalist(s)	Greg Hire; Daniel Johnson; Jesse Wagstaff Thomas Wright	3x3 Basketball	Men's	2 August 2022
2nd place, silver medalist(s)	Hannah Dodd; Georgia Inglis; Amber Merritt; Ella Sabljak	3x3 Basketball	Women's Wheelchair	2 August 2022
2nd place, silver medalist(s)	Georgia Godwin	Gymnastics	Women's uneven bars	1 August 2022
2nd place, silver medalist(s)	Georgia Godwin	Gymnastics	Women's balance beam	2 August 2022
2nd place, silver medalist(s)	Tyson Bull	Gymnastics	Men's horizontal bar	2 August 2022
2nd place, silver medalist(s)	Damien Delgado; Chris Flavel	Lawn bowls	Men's pairs B6–8	2 August 2022
2nd place, silver medalist(s)	Bradley Woodward	Swimming	Men's 200 metre backstroke	2 August 2022
2nd place, silver medalist(s)	Matthew Temple	Swimming	Men's 100 metre butterfly	2 August 2022
2nd place, silver medalist(s)	Shayna Jack	Swimming	Women's 100 metre freestyle	2 August 2022
2nd place, silver medalist(s)	Kiah Melverton	Swimming	Women's 800 metre freestyle	2 August 2022
2nd place, silver medalist(s)	Alex Saffy	Swimming	Men's 100 metre butterfly S10	2 August 2022
2nd place, silver medalist(s)	Samuel Williamson	Swimming	Men's 50 metre breaststroke	2 August 2022
2nd place, silver medalist(s)	Brandon Starc	Athletics	Men's high jump	3 August 2022
2nd place, silver medalist(s)	Zoe Cuthbert	Cycling	Women's cross-country	3 August 2022
2nd place, silver medalist(s)	Cheryl Lindfield; Serena Bonnell	Lawn bowls	Women's pairs B6–8	3 August 2022
2nd place, silver medalist(s)	Benjamin Hance	Swimming	Men's 200 metre freestyle S14	3 August 2022
2nd place, silver medalist(s)	Mollie O'Callaghan	Swimming	Women's 50 metre backstroke	3 August 2022
2nd place, silver medalist(s)	Bradley Woodward; Zac Stubblety-Cook; Matthew Temple; Kyle Chalmers; Mitch Larkin (heat); Samuel Williamson (heat); Cody Simpson (heat); William Yang (heat)	Swimming	Men's 4 × 100 m medley relay	3 August 2022
2nd place, silver medalist(s)	Angie Ballard	Athletics	Women's 1500 m (T54)	4 August 2022
2nd place, silver medalist(s)	Sarah Edmiston	Athletics	Women's discus throw F44/64	4 August 2022
2nd place, silver medalist(s)	Li Shixin	Diving	Men's 1 metre springboard	4 August 2022
2nd place, silver medalist(s)	Ashari Gill; Lidiia Iakovleva; Alexandra Kiroi-Bogatyreva	Gymnastics	Women's rhythmic team all-around	4 August 2022
2nd place, silver medalist(s)	Daniel Golubovic	Athletics	Men's decathlon	5 August 2022
2nd place, silver medalist(s)	Brittany O'Brien	Diving	Women's 1 metre springboard	5 August 2022
2nd place, silver medalist(s)	Eleanor Patterson	Athletics	Women's high jump	6 August 2022
2nd place, silver medalist(s)	Lei Lina	Table tennis	Women's singles C6–10	6 August 2022
2nd place, silver medalist(s)	Kaye Scott	Boxing	Women's light middleweight	7 August 2022
2nd place, silver medalist(s)	Declan Tingay	Athletics	Men's 10,000 m walk	7 August 2022
2nd place, silver medalist(s)	Mackenzie Little	Athletics	Women's javelin throw	7 August 2022
2nd place, silver medalist(s)	Peter Bol	Athletics	Men's 800 metres	7 August 2022
2nd place, silver medalist(s)	Brooke Buschkuehl	Athletics	Women's long jump	7 August 2022
2nd place, silver medalist(s)	Mariafe Artacho; Taliqua Clancy	Beach volleyball	Women's	7 August 2022
2nd place, silver medalist(s)	Callum Peters	Boxing	Men's middleweight	7 August 2022
2nd place, silver medalist(s)	Australia women's national field hockey team: Jocelyn Bartram; Jane Claxton; Claire Colwill; Madison Fitzpatrick; Rebecca Greiner; Greta Hayes; Stephanie Kershaw; Amy Lawton; Ambrosia Malone; Kaitlin Nobbs; Aleisha Power; Karri Somerville; Penny Squibb; Grace Stewart; Renee Taylor; Shanea Tonkin; Mariah Williams; Georgia Wilson	Hockey	Women's tournament	7 August 2022
2nd place, silver medalist(s)	Ma Lin	Table tennis	Men's singles C8–10	7 August 2022
2nd place, silver medalist(s)	Jee Minhyung; Jian Fang Lay	Table tennis	Women's doubles	8 August 2022
2nd place, silver medalist(s)	Li Shixin; Maddison Keeney	Diving	Mixed synchronised 3 m springboard	8 August 2022
3rd place, bronze medalist(s)	Joshua Duffy; Connor Leahy; James Moriarty; Lucas Plapp	Cycling	Men's team pursuit	29 July 2022
3rd place, bronze medalist(s)	Mack Horton	Swimming	Men's 400 m freestyle	29 July 2022
3rd place, bronze medalist(s)	Madison Wilson	Swimming	Women's 200 m freestyle	29 July 2022
3rd place, bronze medalist(s)	Matthew Hauser	Triathlon	Men's	29 July 2022
3rd place, bronze medalist(s)	Conor Leahy	Cycling	Men's individual pursuit	30 July 2022
3rd place, bronze medalist(s)	Elijah Winnington	Swimming	Men's 200 m freestyle	30 July 2022
3rd place, bronze medalist(s)	Chelsea Hodges	Swimming	Women's 50 m breaststroke	30 July 2022
3rd place, bronze medalist(s)	Jacob Templeton	Swimming	Men's 50 m freestyle S13	30 July 2022
3rd place, bronze medalist(s)	Kirralee Hayes	Swimming	Women's 50 m freestyle S13	30 July 2022
3rd place, bronze medalist(s)	Brianna Throssell	Swimming	Women's 100 m butterfly	30 July 2022
3rd place, bronze medalist(s)	Bradley Woodward	Swimming	Men's 100 m backstroke	30 July 2022
3rd place, bronze medalist(s)	Beau Wootton; Luke Zaccaria (Pilot)	Cycling	Men's tandem sprint B	31 July 2022
3rd place, bronze medalist(s)	Shayna Jack	Swimming	Women's 50 m freestyle	31 July 2022
3rd place, bronze medalist(s)	Samuel Williamson	Swimming	Men's 100 m breaststroke	31 July 2022
3rd place, bronze medalist(s)	Blake Cochrane	Swimming	Men's 100 m breaststroke SB8	31 July 2022
3rd place, bronze medalist(s)	Jonathan Goerlach; David Mainwaring (Guide)	Triathlon	Men's PTVI	31 July 2022
3rd place, bronze medalist(s)	Jacob Birtwhistle; Natalie van Coevorden; Matthew Hauser; Sophie Linn	Triathlon	Mixed relay	31 July 2022
3rd place, bronze medalist(s)	Josh Katz	Judo	Men's 60 kg	1 August 2022
3rd place, bronze medalist(s)	Nathan Katz	Judo	Men's 66 kg	1 August 2022
3rd place, bronze medalist(s)	Jian Fang Lay; Yangzi Liu; Minhyung Jee; Chunyi Feng	Table tennis	Women's team	1 August 2022
3rd place, bronze medalist(s)	Rhiannon Clarke	Athletics	Women's 100 m T38	2 August 2022
3rd place, bronze medalist(s)	Lauren Mansfield; Lauren Scherf; Marena Whittle; Alex Wilson	3x3 Basketball	Women's	2 August 2022
3rd place, bronze medalist(s)	Emily Whitehead	Gymnastics	Women's floor	2 August 2022
3rd place, bronze medalist(s)	James Bacueti	Gymnastics	Men's vault	2 August 2022
3rd place, bronze medalist(s)	Katharina Haecker	Judo	Women's 63 kg	2 August 2022
3rd place, bronze medalist(s)	Jake Bensted	Judo	Men's 73 kg	2 August 2022
3rd place, bronze medalist(s)	Uros Nikolic	Judo	Men's 81 kg	2 August 2022
3rd place, bronze medalist(s)	Emma McKeon	Swimming	Women's 100 metre freestyle	2 August 2022
3rd place, bronze medalist(s)	Lani Pallister	Swimming	Women's 800 metre freestyle	2 August 2022
3rd place, bronze medalist(s)	Chelsea Hodges	Swimming	Women's 100 metre breaststroke	2 August 2022
3rd place, bronze medalist(s)	Brianna Throssell	Swimming	Women's 200 metre butterfly	2 August 2022
3rd place, bronze medalist(s)	Keira Stephens	Swimming	Women's 200 metre individual medley SM10	2 August 2022
3rd place, bronze medalist(s)	Liam Park	Judo	Men's + 100 kg	3 August 2022
3rd place, bronze medalist(s)	Harrison Cassar	Judo	Men's 90 kg	3 August 2022
3rd place, bronze medalist(s)	Abigail Paduch	Judo	Women's +78 kg	3 August 2022
3rd place, bronze medalist(s)	Charisma Amoe-Tarrant	Weightlifting	Women's +87 kg	3 August 2022
3rd place, bronze medalist(s)	Jack Ireland	Swimming	Men's 200 metre freestyle S14	3 August 2022
3rd place, bronze medalist(s)	Kaylee McKeown	Swimming	Women's 50 metre backstroke	3 August 2022
3rd place, bronze medalist(s)	Kiah Melverton	Swimming	Women's 400 metre freestyle	3 August 2022
3rd place, bronze medalist(s)	Hani Watson	Para powerlifting	Women's heavyweight	4 August 2022
3rd place, bronze medalist(s)	Ben Wright	Para powerlifting	Men's heavyweight	4 August 2022
3rd place, bronze medalist(s)	Cedric Dubler	Athletics	Men's decathlon	5 August 2022
3rd place, bronze medalist(s)	Sam Carter	Athletics	Men's 1500 metres T54	5 August 2022
3rd place, bronze medalist(s)	Li Shixin; Sam Fricker	Diving	Men's synchronised 3 metre springboard	5 August 2022
3rd place, bronze medalist(s)	Alexandra Kiroi-Bogatyreva	Gymnastics	Women's rhythmic individual all-around	5 August 2022
3rd place, bronze medalist(s)	Cassiel Rousseau; Domonic Bedggood	Diving	Men's synchronised 10 metre platform	5 August 2022
3rd place, bronze medalist(s)	Jayden Lawrence	Wrestling	Men's freestyle 86 kg	5 August 2022
3rd place, bronze medalist(s)	Thomas Barns	Wrestling	Men's freestyle 97 kg	6 August 2022
3rd place, bronze medalist(s)	Edgardo Coumi	Boxing	Men's heavyweight	6 August 2022
3rd place, bronze medalist(s)	Tina Rahimi	Boxing	Women's featherweight	6 August 2022
3rd place, bronze medalist(s)	Caitlin Parker	Boxing	Women's middleweight	6 August 2022
3rd place, bronze medalist(s)	Abbey Caldwell	Athletics	1500 metres	7 August 2022
3rd place, bronze medalist(s)	Ella Connolly; Bree Masters; Naa Anang; Jacinta Beecher; Mia Gross (heat)	Athletics	Women's 4 × 100 metres relay	7 August
3rd place, bronze medalist(s)	Sarah Roy	Cycling	Women's road race	7 August 2022
3rd place, bronze medalist(s)	Yangzi Liu	Table tennis	Women's singles	7 August 2022
3rd place, bronze medalist(s)	Emily Boyd; Cassiel Rousseau	Diving	Mixed synchronised 10 m platform	8 August 2022

Medals by sport
Sport	1st place, gold medalist(s)	2nd place, silver medalist(s)	3rd place, bronze medalist(s)	Total
Swimming	25	21	19	65
Cycling	11	3	4	18
Athletics	10	10	5	25
Gymnastics	4	5	3	12
Diving	4	3	3	10
Lawn bowls	3	3	0	6
Judo	2	0	8	10
Table tennis	1	3	2	6
3x3 basketball	1	2	1	4
Weightlifting	1	2	1	4
Hockey	1	1	0	2
Beach volleyball	1	1	0	2
Cricket	1	0	0	1
Netball	1	0	0	1
Rugby sevens	1	0	0	1
Boxing	0	2	3	5
Triathlon	0	1	3	4
Wrestling	0	0	2	2
Para powerlifting	0	0	2	1
Total	67	57	56	180

Para Medals by sport
Sport	1st place, gold medalist(s)	2nd place, silver medalist(s)	3rd place, bronze medalist(s)	Total
Swimming	5	4	5	14
Athletics	3	3	2	8
Cycling	2	0	1	3
3x3 basketball	1	1	0	2
Table tennis	1	2	0	3
Lawn bowls	0	2	0	2
Triathlon	0	1	1	2
Para powerlifting	0	0	2	2
Total	12	13	11	36

Medals by date
Day	Date	1st place, gold medalist(s)	2nd place, silver medalist(s)	3rd place, bronze medalist(s)	Total
1	29 July	8	4	4	16
2	30 July	5	4	7	16
3	31 July	9	5	6	20
4	1 August	9	7	3	19
5	2 August	11	12	12	35
6	3 August	4	6	7	17
7	4 August	4	4	2	10
8	5 August	0	2	6	8
9	6 August	9	2	4	15
10	7 August	7	9	4	20
11	8 August	1	2	1	4
Total		67	57	56	180

Medals by gender
Gender	1st place, gold medalist(s)	2nd place, silver medalist(s)	3rd place, bronze medalist(s)	Total
Male	22	25	27	74
Female	43	31	27	101
Mixed	2	1	2	5
Total	67	57	56	180

== Competitors ==
The following table shows which sports/disciplines the 429 Australian athletes were to compete in.

Sport	Men	Women	Total
Athletics	36	47	83
Badminton	5	5	10
3x3 Basketball	8	8	16
Beach volleyball	2	2	4
Boxing	7	4	11
Cricket	—N/a	15	15
Cycling	16	16	32
Diving	4	10	14
Field hockey	18	18	36
Gymnastics	5	8	13
Judo	7	4	11
Lawn bowls	10	8	18
Netball	—N/a	12	12
Para powerlifting	1	1	2
Rugby sevens	13	13	26
Squash	4	4	8
Swimming	38	35	73
Table tennis	6	8	14
Triathlon	9	5	14
Weightlifting	5	6	11
Wrestling	4	2	6
Total	198	231	429

== Athletics ==
32 athletes were selected on 16 May 2022. An additional 53 athletes were selected on 28 June 2022. Four athletes – Joseph Deng, Riley Day, Liz Clay and Ashley Moloney withdrew after selection. On 4 August 2022, Kathryn Mitchell and Stewart McSweyn withdrew due to illness. Alec Diamond and Mia Gross replaced Ash Moloney and Riley Day.

Men
Track & road events

Athlete	Event	Heat		Semifinal		Final	
Athlete	Event	Result	Rank	Result	Rank	Result	Rank
Rohan Browning	100 m	10.10	5 Q	10.17	6 Q	10.20	6
Jake Doran	100 m	10.39	24 Q	10.40	20	did not advance	
Anthony Jordan	100 m T47	11.85	9	—N/a		did not advance	
Jaydon Page	100 m T47	11.17	1 Q	—N/a		11.10	2nd place, silver medalist(s)
Evan O'Hanlon (T38)	100 m T37/38	—N/a				11.23 GR	1st place, gold medalist(s)
Steve Solomon	400 m	45.98	5 Q	46.30	8 q	46.22	7
Peter Bol	800 m	1:47.01	1 Q	—N/a		1:47.66	2nd place, silver medalist(s)
Charlie Hunter	800 m	1:49.94	13	—N/a		did not advance	
Oliver Hoare	1500 m	3:37.57	1 Q	—N/a		3:30.12 GR	1st place, gold medalist(s)
Matthew Ramsden	1500 m	3:48.98	15	—N/a		did not advance	
Jake Lappin	1500 m T54	—N/a				3:17.87	4
Sam Carter	1500 m T54	—N/a				3:12.82	3rd place, bronze medalist(s)
Jack Rayner	5000 m	—N/a				13:24.90	8
Matthew Ramsden	5000 m	—N/a				13:30.38	10
Ky Robinson	10000 m	—N/a				27:44.33	6
Nicholas Hough	110 m hurdles	13.62	9 q	—N/a		13.83	7
Ben Buckingham	3000 m steeplechase	—N/a				8:34.17	5
Edward Tippas	3000 m steeplechase	—N/a				8:37.42	7
Joshua Azzopardi; Jacob Despard; Jack Hale; Rohan Browning	4 x 100 m	DNF		did not advance			
Liam Adams	Marathon	—N/a				2:13:23	4
Andrew Buchanan	Marathon	—N/a				2:15:40	7
Jake Lappin	Marathon (T54)	—N/a				1:56:21	5
Kyle Swan	10,000 m walk	—N/a				40:49.79	6
Rhydian Cowley	10,000 m walk	—N/a				41:28.05	8
Declan Tingay	10,000 m walk	—N/a				38:42.33	2nd place, silver medalist(s)

Field events

Athlete	Event	Qualification		Final	
Athlete	Event	Distance	Rank	Distance	Rank
Henry Frayne	Long jump	7.85	5 Q	7.94	6
Chris Mitrevski	Long jump	7.76	7 Q	7.70	9
Julian Konle	Triple jump	—N/a		15.90	10
Brandon Starc	High jump	—N/a		2.25	2nd place, silver medalist(s)
Angus Amstrong	Pole vault	—N/a		4.95	7
Kurtis Marschall	Pole vault	—N/a		5.70	1st place, gold medalist(s)
Matthew Denny	Discus throw	64.63	2 q	67.26 PB	1st place, gold medalist(s)
Cameron McEntyre	Javelin throw	—N/a		79.89	7

Combined events – Decathlon

Athlete	Event	100 m	LJ	SP	HJ	400 m	110H	DT	PV	JT	1500 m	Final	Rank
Cedric Dubler	Result	10.92 (2)	7.61 (2)	12.83 (6)	2.06 (1)	48.47 (1)	14.20 (1)	44.01 (5)	5.00 (1)	51.84 (5)	4:58.81 (7)	8030	3rd place, bronze medalist(s)
Cedric Dubler	Points	878	962	657	859	886	949	746	910	616	567	8030	3rd place, bronze medalist(s)
Alec Diamond	Result	11.14 (5)	7.66 (1)	14.23 (4)	1.97 (4)	50.07 (7)	14.86 (4)	44.05 (4)	4.80 (3)	42.29 (8)	4:50.22 (3)	7689	5
Alec Diamond	Points	830	975	742	776	811	867	747	849	475	617	7689	5
Daniel Golubovic	Result	11.17 (6)	6.98 (7)	15.60 (1)	1.94 (5)	49.08 (3)	14.32 (2)	49.85 (1)	4.90 (2)	58.26 (4)	4:30.95 (1)	8197	2nd place, silver medalist(s)
Daniel Golubovic	Points	823	809	827	749	858	934	867	880	712	738	8197	2nd place, silver medalist(s)

Women
Track & road events

Athlete	Event	Heat		Semifinal		Final	
Athlete	Event	Result	Rank	Result	Rank	Result	Rank
Naa Anang	100 m	11.37	14 Q	11.39	14	did not advance	
Bree Masters	100 m	11.41	17 Q	11.36	13	did not advance	
Sarah Clifton-Bligh (T33)	100 m T34	—N/a				22.71 GR	5
Robyn Lambird (T34)	100 m T34	—N/a				19.68	4
Rosemary Little (T33)	100 m T34	—N/a				23.05	6
Rhiannon Clarke	100 m T38	13.08	3 Q	—N/a		13.13	3rd place, bronze medalist(s)
Indiana Cooper	100 m T38	13.77	8 Q	—N/a		13.88	8
Ella Pardy	100 m T38	13.26	5 Q	—N/a		13.38	5
Jacinta Beecher	200 m	23.13	5 Q	23.40	8	did not advance	
Ella Connolly	200 m	23.56	11 Q	23.41	9 Q	23.21	6
Catriona Bisset	800 m	2:00.40	10 Q	—N/a		1:59.41	5
Georgia Griffith	800 m	2:00.36	9	did not advance			
Abbey Caldwell	1500 m	4:13.59	2 Q	—N/a		4:04.79	3rd place, bronze medalist(s)
Linden Hall	1500 m	4:14.08	4 Q	—N/a		4:05.09	4
Jessica Hull	1500 m	4:16.13	10 Q	—N/a		4:07.31	8
Angie Ballard	1500 m T54	—N/a				3:53.30	2nd place, silver medalist(s)
Christie Dawes	1500 m T54	—N/a				4:00.25	5
Madison de Rozario	1500 m T54	—N/a				3:53.03	1st place, gold medalist(s)
Isobel Batt-Doyle	5000 m	—N/a				15:13.53	8
Rose Davies	5000 m	—N/a				15:41.23	17
Natalie Rule	5000 m	—N/a				15:51.31	18
Isobel Batt-Doyle	10000 m	—N/a				32:04.52	8
Ella Connolly; Bree Masters; Jacinta Beecher; Naa Anang; Mia Gross (heat)	4 x 100 m	43.47	3 Q	—N/a		43.16	3rd place, bronze medalist(s)
Sinead Diver	Marathon	—N/a				2:31:06	5
Jessica Stenson	Marathon	—N/a				2:27:31	1st place, gold medalist(s)
Eloise Wellings	Marathon	—N/a				2:30:51	4
Christie Dawes	Marathon T54	—N/a				2:07:02	4
Madison de Rozario	Marathon T54	—N/a				1:56:00 GR	1st place, gold medalist(s)
Michelle Jenneke	100 m hurdles	12.63	2 Q	—N/a		12.68	5
Celeste Mucci	100 m hurdles	12.96	8 q	—N/a		13.03	7
Sarah Cali	400 m hurdles	56.10	6 q	—N/a		55.82	6
Amy Cashin	3000 m steeplechase	—N/a				9:35.63	5
Brielle Erbacher	3000 m steeplechase	—N/a				10:59.64	8
Katie Hayward	10,000 m walk	—N/a				46:09.00	7
Rebecca Henderson	10,000 m walk	—N/a				44:44.00	4
Jemima Montag	10,000 m walk	—N/a				42:34.00 GR	1st place, gold medalist(s)

Field events

Athlete	Event	Qualification		Final	
Athlete	Event	Distance	Rank	Distance	Rank
Nicola Olyslagers	High jump	1.81	1 q	DNS	
Eleanor Patterson	High jump	1.81	1 q	1.92	2nd place, silver medalist(s)
Brooke Buschkuehl	Long jump	6.84	2 Q	6.95	2nd place, silver medalist(s)
Samantha Dale	Long jump	6.02	12 q	6.32	10
Nina Kennedy	Pole vault	—N/a		4.60	1st place, gold medalist(s)
Taryn Gollshewsky	Discus throw	—N/a		56.85	4
Sarah Edmiston	Discus throw F44/64	—N/a		34.96	2nd place, silver medalist(s)
Alexandra Hulley	Hammer throw	66.15	4 q	66.26	6
Kelsey-Lee Barber	Javelin	—N/a		64.43	1st place, gold medalist(s)
Mackenzie Little	Javelin	—N/a		64.27	2nd place, silver medalist(s)
Julie Charlton	Shot put F57	—N/a		6.26	9

Combined events – Heptathlon

Athlete	Event	100H	HJ	SP	200 m	LJ	JT	800 m	Final	Rank
Taneille Crase	Result	13.42 (1)	1.78 (3)	11.89 (5)	24.48 (2)	6.23 (3)	37.95 (5)	2:16.40 (5)	6026	5
Taneille Crase	Points	1062	953	654	935	921	628	873	6026	5

Australian women's 4 x 100m relay elevated to bronze medal due to the disqualification of Nigeria to an anti-doping violation.

== Badminton ==
Ten athletes were selected on 31 May 2022. As of 1 June 2022, Australia also qualified for the mixed team event via the BWF World Rankings.

Singles

Athlete	Event	Round of 64	Round of 32	Round of 16	Quarterfinal	Semifinal	Final / BM	
Athlete	Event	Opposition Score	Opposition Score	Opposition Score	Opposition Score	Opposition Score	Opposition Score	Rank
Ying Xiang Lin	Men's singles	Abela (MLT); W (21–16, 21–9)	N Ramdhani (GUY); W (21–12, 21–8)	Sen (IND); L 0-2 (8-21, 16-21)	did not advance			9
Jacob Schueler	Men's singles	Ricketts (JAM); L (19–21, 15–21)	did not advance					33
Nathan Tang	Men's singles	Mdogo Sikoyo (KEN); W (21–10, 21–13)	Penty (ENG); L (11–21, 7–21)	did not advance				17
Wendy Chen	Women's singles	Bye	Bodha (MRI); W (21–3, 21–6)	Richardson (JAM); W (21–11, 21–11)	Yeo (SGP); L (21–15, 21–15)	did not advance		5
Tiffany Ho	Women's singles	Bye	Gilmour (SCO); L (6–21, 14–21)	did not advance				17

Doubles

Athlete	Event	Round of 64	Round of 32	Round of 16	Quarterfinal	Semifinal	Final / BM	
Athlete	Event	Opposition Score	Opposition Score	Opposition Score	Opposition Score	Opposition Score	Opposition Score	Rank
Tran Hoang Pham; Jack Yu	Men's doubles	—N/a	Clark & D March (FLK); W (21–5, 21–7)	Angus & Ricketts (JAM); W (21–11, 21–9)	Lane & Vendy (ENG); L (10-21, 14-21)	did not advance		5
Jacob Schueler; Nathan Tang	Men's doubles	—N/a	Bye	Abela & Cassar (MLT); W 2-0 (21-15, 21-9)	Rankireddy & Shetty (IND); L (9-21, 11-21)	did not advance		5
Kaitlyn Ea; Angela Yu	Women's doubles	—N/a	A Abdul Razzaq & F Abdul Razzaq (MDV); W (21–13, 21–5)	Jin & Wong (SGP); L (12–21, 13–21)	did not advance			9
Wendy Chen; Gronya Somerville	Women's doubles	—N/a	Shahzad & Siddique (PAK); W (21–10, 21–13)	Johnson & Le Tissiere (GGY); W 2-0 (21-9, 21-7)	Honderich & Tsai (CAN); W 2-1 (18-21, 21-15, 21-16)	Birch & Smith (ENG); L 0-2 (14-21, 22-24)	Jolly & Gopichand (IND); L 0-2 (15-21, 18-21)	4
Tran Hoang Pham; Angela Yu	Mixed doubles	Joshua & S March (FLK); W (2-0 21–2, 21–5)	Mwambu & Naluwooza (UGA); W 2-0 (21–6, 21–7)	Leydon-Davis & Pak (NZL); L (12–21, 15–21)	did not advance			9
Yingxiang Lin; Gronya Somerville	Mixed doubles	Clark & C March (FLK); W (21–4, 21–3)	Kasiyre & Mohamed Rafi (UGA); W (21–10, 21–6)	Tan & Lai (MAS); L (10–21, 11–21)	did not advance			9
Jack Yu; Kaitlyn Ea	Mixed doubles	Bye	Ricketts & Richardson (JAM); W (21–13, 16–21, 21–8)	Chan & Cheah (MAS); L (16-21, 12-21)	did not advance			9

Mixed team

Summary

Team	Event	Group stage				Quarterfinal	Semifinal	Final / BM	
Team	Event	Opposition Score	Opposition Score	Opposition Score	Rank	Opposition Score	Opposition Score	Opposition Score	Rank
Australia	Mixed team	Sri Lanka; L 2–3	Pakistan; W 3–2	India; L 4–1	3	did not advance			9

Squad

- Yingxiang Lin
- Tran Hoang Pham
- Jacob Schueler
- Nathan Tang
- Jack Yu
- Wendy Chen
- Kaitlyn Ea
- Tiffany Ho
- Gronya Somerville
- Angela Yu

Group stage

Pos	Team	Pld	W	L	MF	MA	MD	GF	GA	GD	PF	PA	PD	Pts	Qualification
1	India	3	3	0	14	1	+13	28	2	+26	620	329	+291	3	Knockout stage
2	Sri Lanka	3	2	1	7	8	−1	14	16	−2	489	520	−31	2	Knockout stage
3	Australia	3	1	2	6	9	−3	12	18	−6	514	546	−32	1	
4	Pakistan	3	0	3	3	12	−9	6	24	−18	382	610	−228	0	

Source: BWF

Australia
2
National Exhibition Centre, Court 4
29 July 2022, 14:00 UTC+1

Sri Lanka
3

			1	2	3
1	(Australia) (Sri Lanka)	Yingxiang Lin / Gronya Somerville; Sachin Dias / Thilini Hendahewa	18; 21	14; 21
2	(Australia) (Sri Lanka)	Nathan Tang; Niluka Karunaratne	18; 21	12; 21
3	(Australia) (Sri Lanka)	Chen Hsuan-yu; Suhasni Vidanage	21; 10	21; 13
4	(Australia) (Sri Lanka)	Tran Hoang Pham / Jack Yu; Sachin Dias / Niluka Karunaratne	16; 21	14; 21
5	(Australia) (Sri Lanka)	Chen Hsuan-yu / Gronya Somerville; Thilini Hendahewa / Suhasni Vidanage	21; 18	21; 14

Australia
3
National Exhibition Centre, Court 1
30 July 2022, 09:00 UTC+1

Pakistan
2

			1	2	3
1	(Australia) (Pakistan)	Jack Yu / Kaitlyn Ea; Murad Ali / Ghazala Siddique	21; 17	21; 17
2	(Australia) (Pakistan)	Jacob Schueler; Muhammad Irfan Saeed Bhatti	18; 21	16; 21
3	(Australia) (Pakistan)	Tiffany Ho; Mahoor Shahzad	18; 21	19; 21
4	(Australia) (Pakistan)	Tran Hoang Pham / Jack Yu; Murad Ali / Muhammad Irfan Saeed Bhatti	21; 11	21; 19
5	(Australia) (Pakistan)	Angela Yu / Kaitlyn Ea; Mahoor Shahzad / Ghazala Siddique	21; 11	21; 6

India
4
National Exhibition Centre, Court 2
30 July 2022, 19:00 UTC+1

Australia
1

			1	2	3
1	(India) (Australia)	Srikanth Kidambi; Yingxiang Lin	21; 14	21; 13
2	(India) (Australia)	P. V. Sindhu; Chen Hsuan-yu	21; 10	21; 12
3	(India) (Australia)	B. Sumeeth Reddy / Chirag Shetty; Tran Hoang Pham / Jack Yu	21; 16	21; 19
4	(India) (Australia)	Treesa Jolly / Gayatri Gopichand; Chen Hsuan-yu / Gronya Somerville	13; 21	19; 21
5	(India) (Australia)	B. Sumeeth Reddy / Ashwini Ponnappa; Yingxiang Lin / Gronya Somerville	21; 14	21; 11

== 3x3 basketball ==
Australia qualified to compete in both the men's and women's tournaments, having done so as the highest-ranked nation not already qualified by regional rankings. As of 19 May 2022, they also accepted Bipartite Invitations for both wheelchair tournaments (awarded in lieu of the quotas from the abandoned IWBF Asia/Oceania Qualifiers). Sixteen players were selected on 13 July 2022.

Summary

Team	Event	Preliminary round				Quarterfinal	Semifinal	Final / BM / PM	
Team	Event	Opposition Result	Opposition Result	Opposition Result	Rank	Opposition Result	Opposition Result	Opposition Result	Rank
Australia men	Men's tournament	Trinidad and Tobago; W 21–6	New Zealand; W 21–11	England; L 12–17	2 Q	Kenya; W 20–15	Scotland; W 20–15	England; L 16–17	2nd place, silver medalist(s)
Australia women	Women's tournament	Scotland; W 21–9	Kenya; W 21–15	Sri Lanka; W 21–2	1 Q	—N/a	England; L 15–21	New Zealand; W 15–13	3rd place, bronze medalist(s)
Australia wheelchair men	Men's tournament	Canada; W 13–11	Northern Ireland; L 9–11	—N/a	2 Q	—N/a	England; W 12–11	Canada; W 11–9	1st place, gold medalist(s)
Australia wheelchair women	Women's tournament	Scotland; W 12–5	South Africa; W 21–3	—N/a	1 Q	—N/a	England; W 8–6	Canada; L 5–14	2nd place, silver medalist(s)

=== Men's tournament ===
Roster

- Jesse Wagstaff
- Greg Hire
- Tom Wright
- Daniel Johnson

Group B

Pos	Team	Pld	W	L	PF	PA	PD	Qualification
1	England (H)	3	3	0	59	28	+31	Direct to semi-finals
2	Australia	3	2	1	54	34	+20	Quarter-finals
3	New Zealand	3	1	2	42	54	−12	Quarter-finals
4	Trinidad and Tobago	3	0	3	24	63	−39	

Source: Birmingham 2022
Rules for classification: 1) Wins; 2) Head-to-head record; 3) Points scored.
(H) Hosts

30 July 2022
15:30

Report

Australia	21–6	Trinidad and Tobago
Pts: Johnson 11		Pts: Julien 3

Smithfield

30 July 2022
19:30

Report

Australia	21–11	New Zealand
Pts: Johnson 9		Pts: Bezzant 4

Smithfield

31 July 2022
19:30

Report

England	17–12	Australia
Pts: Hesson 8		Pts: Johnson 8

Smithfield

Quarter-final

1 August 2022
17:00

Report

Australia	20–15	Kenya
Pts: Wright 8		Pts: Omondi 6

Smithfield

Semi-final

1 August 2022
19:30

Report

Scotland	15–20	Australia
Pts: Jimenez 11		Pts: Wagstaff 9

Smithfield

Gold medal match

2 August 2022
19:30

Report

Australia	16–17	England
Pts: Johnson 7		Pts: Hesson 6

Smithfield

=== Women's tournament ===
Roster

- Lauren Scherf
- Lauren Mansfield
- Marena Whittle
- Alex Wilson

Group A

Pos	Team	Pld	W	L	PF	PA	PD	Qualification
1	Australia	3	3	0	63	26	+37	Direct to semi-finals
2	Scotland	3	2	1	45	40	+5	Quarter-finals
3	Kenya	3	1	2	50	44	+6	Quarter-finals
4	Sri Lanka	3	0	3	15	63	−48	

Source: Birmingham 2022
Rules for classification: 1) Wins; 2) Head-to-head record; 3) Points scored.

29 July 2022
15:30

Report

Australia	21–9	Scotland
Pts: Wilson 7		Pts: Leonard 5

Smithfield

29 July 2022
19:30

Report

Australia	21–15	Kenya
Pts: Scherf 9		Pts: Otieno 5

Smithfield

31 July 2022
15:30

Report

Sri Lanka	2–21	Australia
Pts: Morseth 2		Pts: Whittle 8

Smithfield

Semi-final

1 August 2022
19:30

Report

Australia	15–21	England
Pts: Mansfield 8		Pts: Green 8

Smithfield

Bronze medal match

2 August 2022
15:00

Report

Australia	15–13	New Zealand
Pts: Whittle 9		Pts: Harmon 7

Smithfield

=== Men's wheelchair ===
Roster

- Luke Pople
- Lachlin Dalton
- Jake Kavanagh
- Kurt Thomson

Group B

Pos	Team	Pld	W	L	PF	PA	PD	Qualification
1	Canada	2	1	1	24	18	+6	Semi-finals
2	Australia	2	1	1	24	24	0	Semi-finals
3	Northern Ireland	2	1	1	16	22	−6	5th place match

Source: Birmingham 2022
Rules for classification: 1) Wins; 2) Head-to-head record; 3) Points scored.

29 July 2022
19:30

Report

Canada	11–13	Australia
Pts: Higgins 7		Pts: Dalton 8

Smithfield

31 July 2022
19:30

Report

Australia	9–11	Northern Ireland
Pts: Dalton, Pople 5		Pts: Nagle 5

Smithfield

Semi-final

1 August 2022
19:30

Report

England	11–12	Australia
Pts: Manning 7		Pts: Pople, Kavanagh 4

Smithfield

Gold medal match

2 August 2022
19:30

Report

Australia	11–9	Canada
Pts: Pople 6		Pts: Higgins 5

Smithfield

=== Women's wheelchair ===
Roster

- Amber Merritt
- Georgia Inglis
- Hannah Dodd
- Ella Sabljak

Group B

Pos	Team	Pld	W	L	PF	PA	PD	Qualification
1	Australia	2	2	0	33	8	+25	Semi-finals
2	Scotland	2	1	1	21	14	+7	Semi-finals
3	South Africa	2	0	2	5	37	−32	5th place match

Source: Birmingham 2022
Rules for classification: 1) Wins; 2) Head-to-head record; 3) Points scored.

29 July 2022
19:30

Report

Australia	12–5	Scotland
Pts: Merrit 5		Pts: Hamer 5

Smithfield

31 July 2022
19:30

Report

South Africa	3–21	Australia
Pts: Moeng 2		Pts: Merritt 11

Smithfield

Semi-final

1 August 2022
15:00

Report

Australia	8–6	England
Pts: Merritt 4		Pts: Conroy 3

Smithfield

Gold medal match

2 August 2022
19:30

Report

Canada	14–5	Australia
Pts: Dandeneau 6		Pts: Dodd 3

Smithfield

== Beach volleyball ==
Four players selected on 13 May 2022.

Athlete	Event	Preliminary round				Quarterfinals	Semifinals	Final / GM	
Athlete	Event	Opposition Score	Opposition Score	Opposition Score	Rank	Opposition Score	Opposition Score	Opposition Score	Rank
Paul Burnett; Chris McHugh	Men's	Maldives; W 2–0 (21–13, 21–17)	South Africa; W 2–0 (21–12, 21–12)	Rwanda; W 2–0 (21–16, 21–18)	1	Sri Lanka; W 2–1 (16–21, 21–16, 15–9)	Rwanda; W 2–0 (21–18, 21–14)	Canada; W 2–1 (17-21, 21-17, 20-18)	1st place, gold medalist(s)
Mariafe Artacho; Taliqua Clancy	Women's	Sri Lanka; W 2–0 (21–10, 21–12)	Trinidad and Tobago; W 2–0 (21–7, 21–6)	Cyprus; W 2–0 (21–14, 21–13)	1	Scotland; W 2–0 (21–11, 21–11)	Vanuatu; W 2–0 (26–24, 21–16)	Canada; L 1-2 (24-22, 17-21, 12-15)	2nd place, silver medalist(s)

=== Men's tournament ===
Group B

Pos	Team	Pld	W	L	Pts	SW	SL	SR	SPW	SPL	SPR	Qualification
1	Burnett – McHugh (AUS)	3	3	0	6	6	0	MAX	126	88	1.432	Quarterfinals
2	Ntagengwa – Gatsinze (RWA)	3	2	1	5	4	3	1.333	127	128	0.992	Quarterfinals
3	Williams – Goldschmidt (RSA)	3	1	2	4	2	5	0.400	109	132	0.826	Ranking of third-placed teams
4	Ismail – Naseem (MDV)	3	0	3	3	2	6	0.333	129	143	0.902	

Source: birmingham2022.com

Qualified for the Quarterfinals

30 July 2022; 19:00	Burnett – McHugh (AUS)	2–0	Ismail – Naseem (MDV)	Smithfield
30 July 2022; 19:00	(21–13, 21–17); Report			Smithfield

1 August 2022; 14:30	Burnett – McHugh (AUS)	2–0	Williams – Goldschmidt (RSA)	Smithfield
1 August 2022; 14:30	(21–12, 21–12); Report			Smithfield

3 August 2022; 14:30	Burnett – McHugh (AUS)	2–0	Ntagengwa – Gatsinze (RWA)	Smithfield
3 August 2022; 14:30	(21–16, 21–18); Report			Smithfield

Quarter-final

5 August 2022; 11:00	O'Dea – Fuller (NZL)	0–2	Ntagengwa – Gatsinze (RWA)	Smithfield
5 August 2022; 11:00	(18–21, 19–21); Report			Smithfield

Semi-final

6 August 2022; 15:00	Ntagengwa – Gatsinze (RWA)	0–2	Burnett – McHugh (AUS)	Smithfield
6 August 2022; 15:00	(18–21, 14–21); Report			Smithfield

Gold medal match

7 August 2022; 16:00	Dearing – Schachter (CAN)	1–2	Burnett – McHugh (AUS)	Smithfield
7 August 2022; 16:00	(21–17, 17–21, 18–20); Report			Smithfield

=== Women's tournament ===
Group B

Pos	Team	Pld	W	L	Pts	SW	SL	SR	SPW	SPL	SPR	Qualification
1	Artacho – Clancy (AUS)	3	3	0	6	6	0	MAX	126	62	2.032	Quarterfinals
2	Konstantopoulou – Konstantinou (CYP)	3	2	1	5	4	2	2.000	111	84	1.321	Quarterfinals
3	Bandara – Weerasinghe (SRI)	3	1	2	4	2	4	0.500	40	84	0.476	Ranking of third-placed teams
4	Armstrong – Chase (TTO)	3	0	3	3	0	6	0.000	37	126	0.294	

Source: birmingham2022.com

Qualified for the Quarterfinals

31 July 2022; 14:30	Artacho – Clancy (AUS)	2–0	Bandara – Weerasinghe (SRI)	Smithfield
31 July 2022; 14:30	(21–10, 21–12); Report			Smithfield

2 August 2022; 14:30	Artacho – Clancy (AUS)	2–0	Armstrong – Chase (TTO)	Smithfield
2 August 2022; 14:30	(21–7, 21–6); Report			Smithfield

4 August 2022; 14:30	Artacho – Clancy (AUS)	2–0	Konstantopoulou – Konstantinou (CYP)	Smithfield
4 August 2022; 14:30	(21–14, 21–13); Report			Smithfield

Quarter-final

5 August 2022; 14:30	Beattie – Coutts (SCO)	0–2	Artacho – Clancy (AUS)	Smithfield
5 August 2022; 14:30	(11–21, 11–21); Report			Smithfield

Semi-final

6 August 2022; 21:00	Pata – Toko (VAN)	0–2	Artacho – Clancy (AUS)	Smithfield
6 August 2022; 21:00	(24–26, 16–21); Report			Smithfield

Gold medal match

7 August 2022; 21:00	Humana-Paredes – Pavan (CAN)	2–1	Artacho – Clancy (AUS)	Smithfield
7 August 2022; 21:00	(22–24, 21–17, 15–12); Report			Smithfield

== Boxing ==
Eleven boxers were selected on 26 April 2022.

Men

Athlete	Event	Round of 32	Round of 16	Quarterfinals	Semifinals	Final	
Athlete	Event	Opposition Result	Opposition Result	Opposition Result	Opposition Result	Opposition Result	Rank
Alex Winwood	51 kg	—N/a	Bye	Chinyemba (ZAM); L KO	did not advance		
Charlie Senior	57 kg	Amram (NRU); W 5–0	Al-Ahmadieh (CAN); L 2–3	did not advance			
Billy Polkinghorn	63.5 kg	Roselie (SEY); W KO	Tukamuhebwa (UGA); L KO	did not advance			
Taha Ahmad	71 kg	Bye	Clair (MRI); L 0–5	did not advance			
Callum Peters	75 kg	Bye	Sumit (IND); W 5–0	Amsterdam (GUY); W RSC	Bongco (RSA); W 5–0	Hickey (SCO); L 2–3	2nd place, silver medalist(s)
Billy McAllister	80 kg	Bye	Ennis (JAM); L 2–3	did not advance			
Edgardo Coumi	92 kg	—N/a	Bye	Oltons (AIA); W RSC	Williams (ENG); L 0-5	—N/a	3rd place, bronze medalist(s)

Women

Athlete	Event	Round of 16	Quarterfinals	Semifinals	Final	
Athlete	Event	Opposition Result	Opposition Result	Opposition Result	Opposition Result	Rank
Kristy Harris	50 kg	McNaul (NIR); L 2–3	did not advance			
Tina Rahimi	57 kg	Bye	Toussaint (ENG); W 5–0	Oshoba (NGR); L 1-4	—N/a	3rd place, bronze medalist(s)
Kaye Scott	70 kg	Bye	Keita (SLE); W 5–0	Panguane (MOZ); W 4–1	Eccles (WAL); L RSC	2nd place, silver medalist(s)
Caitlin Parker	75 kg	Bye	Andiego (KEN); W 5–0	Thibeault (CAN); L 0-5	—N/a	3rd place, bronze medalist(s)

== Cricket ==
By virtue of its position in the ICC Women's T20I rankings (as of 1 April 2021), Australia qualified for the tournament.

Fixtures were announced in November 2021.

Roster

Fifteen players were selected on 20 May 2022.

- Darcie Brown
- Nicola Carey
- Ashleigh Gardner
- Grace Harris
- Rachael Haynes
- Alyssa Healy
- Jess Jonassen
- Alana King
- Meg Lanning
- Tahlia McGrath
- Beth Mooney
- Ellyse Perry
- Megan Schutt
- Annabel Sutherland
- Amanda-Jade Wellington

Summary

Team	Event	Group stage				Semifinal	Final / BM	
Team	Event	Opposition Result	Opposition Result	Opposition Result	Rank	Opposition Result	Opposition Result	Rank
Australia women	Women's tournament	India; W by 3 wickets	Barbados; W by 9 wickets	Pakistan; W by 44 runs	1	New Zealand; W by 5 wickets	India; W by 9 runs	1st place, gold medalist(s)

Group stage

Pos	Team	Pld	W	L	NR	Pts	NRR
1	Australia	3	3	0	0	6	2.832
2	India	3	2	1	0	4	2.511
3	Barbados	3	1	2	0	2	−2.953
4	Pakistan	3	0	3	0	0	−1.768

Source: ESPNcricinfo

29 July 2022
11:00
Scorecard

India; 154/8 (20 overs)	v	Australia; 157/7 (19 overs)
Harmanpreet Kaur 52 (34); Jess Jonassen 4/22 (4 overs)		Ashleigh Gardner 52* (35); Renuka Singh Thakur 4/18 (4 overs)

Australia won by 3 wickets
Edgbaston, Birmingham
Umpires: Lauren Agenbag (SA) and Sue Redfern (Eng)
Player of the match: Ashleigh Gardner (Aus)

- India won the toss and elected to bat.
- Meghna Singh (Ind) made her WT20I debut.
- Alyssa Healy (Aus) became the first player, male or female, to take 100 dismissals as a wicket-keeper in T20I cricket.

31 July 2022
18:00 (D/N)
Scorecard

Barbados; 64 (20 overs)	v	Australia; 68/1 (8.1 overs)
Hayley Matthews 18 (13); Alana King 4/8 (4 overs)		Meg Lanning 36* (21); Shanika Bruce 1/7 (2 overs)

Australia won by 9 wickets
Edgbaston, Birmingham
Umpires: Shivani Mishra (Qat) and Sue Redfern (Eng)
Player of the match: Alana King (Aus)

- Australia won the toss and elected to field.
- Keila Elliott (Bar) made her WT20I debut.

3 August 2022
11:00
Scorecard

Australia; 160/2 (20 overs)	v	Pakistan; 116/8 (20 overs)
Tahlia McGrath 78* (51); Sadia Iqbal 1/28 (4 overs)		Fatima Sana 35* (26); Tahlia McGrath 3/13 (3 overs)

Australia won by 44 runs
Edgbaston, Birmingham
Umpires: Lauren Agenbag (SA) and Sue Redfern (Eng)
Player of the match: Tahlia McGrath (Aus)

- Australia won the toss and elected to bat.

Semi-final

6 August 2022
18:00 (D/N)
Scorecard

New Zealand; 144/7 (20 overs)	v	Australia; 145/5 (19.3 overs)
Sophie Devine 53 (48); Megan Schutt 3/20 (4 overs)		Beth Mooney 36 (29); Lea Tahuhu 3/20 (4 overs)

Australia won by 5 wickets
Edgbaston, Birmingham
Umpires: Lauren Agenbag (SA) and Jacqueline Williams (WI)
Player of the match: Sophie Devine (NZ)

- Australia won the toss and elected to field.
- Georgia Plimmer (NZ) made her WT20I debut.

Gold medal match

7 August 2022
17:00 (D/N)
Scorecard

Australia; 161/8 (20 overs)	v	India; 152 (19.3 overs)
Beth Mooney 61 (41); Renuka Singh Thakur 2/25 (4 overs)		Harmanpreet Kaur 65 (43); Ashleigh Gardner 3/16 (3 overs)

Australia won by 9 runs
Edgbaston, Birmingham
Umpires: Kim Cotton (NZ) and Jacqueline Williams (WI)
Player of the match: Beth Mooney (Aus)

- Australia won the toss and elected to bat.
- Yastika Bhatia (Ind) replaced Taniya Bhatia as a concussion substitute.

== Cycling ==
34 cyclists were selected on 16 June 2022. Michael Matthews and Kaden Groves withdrew due to trade team commitments and were replaced by Luke Durbridge and Sam Fox in the road race. Caleb Ewan withdrew due to surgery after the 2022 Tour de France.

=== Road ===
Men

Athlete	Event	Time	Rank
Luke Durbridge	Road race	3:37:08	46
Sam Fox	Road race	3:37:08	48
Lucas Plapp	Road race	3:28:32	6
Miles Scotson	Road race	3:36:46	16
Rohan Dennis	Time trial	46:21.24	1st place, gold medalist(s)
Lucas Plapp	Time trial	48:47.70	5

Women

Athlete	Event	Time	Rank
Georgia Baker	Road race	2:44:46	1st place, gold medalist(s)
Grace Brown	Road race	2:44:57	33
Brodie Chapman	Road race	2:45:08	35
Alexandra Manly	Road race	2:44:46	23
Ruby Roseman-Gannon	Road race	2:44:57	29
Sarah Roy	Road race	2:44:46	3rd place, bronze medalist(s)
Georgia Baker	Time trial	41:44.85	4
Grace Brown	Time trial	40:05.20	1st place, gold medalist(s)
Sarah Roy	Time trial	42:26.44	9

=== Track ===
Sprint

Athlete	Event	Qualification		Round 1	Quarterfinals	Semifinals	Final / BM	
Athlete	Event	Time	Rank	Opposition Time	Opposition Time	Opposition Time	Opposition Time	Rank
Thomas Cornish	Men's sprint	9.747	5 Q	Browne (TTO); W 10.506	Glaetzer (AUS); L 10.272, L10.173	did not advance		
Matthew Glaetzer	Men's sprint	9.652	4 Q	Laitonjam (IND); W 10.506	Cornish (AUS); W 10.272, W 10.173	Paul (TTO); W 10.018, L9.928, L9.816	Carlin (SCO); L 9.956, W 10.044, L 10.146 REL	4
Matthew Richardson	Men's sprint	9.598	2 Q	Owens (ENG); W 10.902	Sahrom (MAS); W 11.231, L 10.001, W10.229	Carlin (SCO); L 10.176, W 9.923, W 10.130	Paul (TTO); W 10.002, W 10.079	1st place, gold medalist(s)
Leigh Hoffman; Matthew Richardson; Matthew Glaetzer	Men's team sprint	42.222	1 QG	—N/a			42.040 GR	1st place, gold medalist(s)
Beau Wootton; Luke Zaccaria (pilot)	Men's tandem sprint B & VI	10.370	3 Q	—N/a		Ball (WAL); L 10.053, L10.514	Pope (WAL); W 10.743, W 10.680	3rd place, bronze medalist(s)
Kristina Clonan	Women's sprint	10.825	5 Q	Ridge Davis (ENG); W 11.382	Finucane (WAL); L 11.413, W 11.407, L11.514	did not advance		
Breanna Hargrave	Women's sprint	10.958	11 Q	Andrews (NZL); L 11.854	did not advance			
Alessia McCaig	Women's sprint	11.301	17	did not advance				
Alessia McCaig; Breanna Hargrave; Kristina Clonan	Women's team sprint	48.355	4 QB	—N/a			48.123	4
Jessica Gallagher; Caitlin Ward (pilot)	Women's tandem sprint B & VI	10.675	1	—N/a		Libby Clegg; Jenny Holl (pilot) (SCO); W, W	Aileen McGlynn; Ellie Stone (pilot) (SCO); W, W	1st place, gold medalist(s)

Keirin

Athlete	Event	Round 1	Repechage	Semifinals	Final
Thomas Cornish	Men's keirin	3	1 Q	6	8
Matthew Glaetzer	Men's keirin	1 Q	Bye	5	DNS
Matthew Richardson	Men's keirin	3	1 Q	3	4
Kristina Clonan	Women's keirin	2 Q	Bye	6	8
Breanna Hargrave	Women's keirin	2 Q	Bye	4	12
Alessia McCaig	Women's keirin	2 Q	Bye	6	11

Pursuit

Athlete	Event	Qualification		Final / BM	
Athlete	Event	Time	Rank	Opponent Results	Rank
Conor Leahy	Men's pursuit	4:09.023	3 QB	4:09.311	3rd place, bronze medalist(s)
Jame Moriarty	Men's pursuit	4:14.023	9	did not advance	
Lucas Plapp	Men's pursuit	4:14.015	8	did not advance	
Josh Duffy; Graeme Frislie; Conor Leahy; James Moriarty; Luke Plapp	Men's team pursuit	3:51.274	3 QB	3:50.403	3rd place, bronze medalist(s)
Sophie Edwards	Women's pursuit	3:33.079	10	did not advance	
Maeve Plouffe	Women's pursuit	3:21.995	2 QG	3:27.122	2nd place, silver medalist(s)
Sarah Roy	Women's pursuit	3:25.262	4 QB	3:28.079	4
Georgia Baker; Sophie Edwards; Chloe Moran; Maeve Plouffe	Women's team pursuit	4:14.605	1 QG GR	4:12.234 GR	1st place, gold medalist(s)

Time trial

Athlete	Event	Time	Rank
Thomas Cornish	Men's time trial	1:00.036	2nd place, silver medalist(s)
Matthew Richardson	Men's time trial	1:00.152	4
Matthew Glaetzer	Men's time trial	59.505	1st place, gold medalist(s)
Beau Wootton; Luke Zaccaria (pilot)	Men's tandem time trial B & VI	1:02.824	4
Kristina Clonan	Women's time trial	33.234 GR	1st place, gold medalist(s)
Breanna Hargrave	Women's time trial	33.995	7
Alessia McCaig	Women's time trial	34.382	8
Jessica Gallagher; Caitlin Ward (pilot)	Women's tandem time trial B & VI	1:07.138	1st place, gold medalist(s)

Points race

Athlete	Event	Final	
Athlete	Event	Points	Rank
Graeme Frislie	Men's points race	DNF	10
Conor Leahy	Men's points race	DNF	10
Lucas Plapp	Men's points race	9	6
Georgia Baker	Women's points race	55	1st place, gold medalist(s)
Maeve Plouffe	Women's points race	0	17
Chloe Moran	Women's points race	25	7

Scratch race

Athlete	Event	Qualification	Final
Joshua Duffy	Men's scratch race	6 Q	13
Graeme Frislie	Men's scratch race	3 Q	6
James Morarty	Men's scratch race	9 Q	13
Sophie Edwards	Women's scratch race	—N/a	17
Chloe Moran	Women's scratch race	—N/a	6
Alyssa Polites	Women's scratch race	—N/a	18

=== Mountain biking ===
Athlete	Event	Time	Rank
Sam Fox	Men's cross-country	1:37:20	6
Daniel McConnell	Men's cross-country	1:37:26	7
Zoe Cuthbert	Women's cross-country	1:35:46	2nd place, silver medalist(s)

== Diving ==
Fourteen divers – 10 women and 4 men selected on 7 June 2022.

Men

Athlete	Event	Preliminaries		Final	
Athlete	Event	Points	Rank	Points	Rank
Li Shixin	1 m springboard	388.70	1 Q	437.05	2nd place, silver medalist(s)
Sam Fricker	3 m springboard	356.90	10 Q	370.65	10
Li Shixin	3 m springboard	456.65	1 Q	448.50	5
Sam Fricker	10 m platform	301.60	13 R	390.35	10
Cassiel Rousseau	10 m platform	466.90	1 Q	501.30	1st place, gold medalist(s)
Sam Fricker; Li Shixin	3 m springboard synchronised	—N/a		374.52	3rd place, bronze medalist(s)
Domonic Bedggood; Cassiel Rousseau	10 m platform synchronised	—N/a		412.56	3rd place, bronze medalist(s)

Women

Athlete	Event	Preliminaries		Final	
Athlete	Event	Points	Rank	Points	Rank
Brittany O'Brien	1 m springboard	223.70	8 Q	279.60	2nd place, silver medalist(s)
Esther Qin	1 m springboard	266.95	3 Q	265.10	6
Georgia Sheehan	1 m springboard	266.00	4 Q	267.95	5
Maddison Keeney	3 m springboard	327.90	1 Q	348.95	1st place, gold medalist(s)
Brittany O'Brien	3 m springboard	271.50	7 Q	292.80	9
Georgia Sheehan	3 m springboard	271.50	7 Q	306.00	7
Emily Boyd	10 m platform	304.30	3 Q	296.60	7
Nikita Hains	10 m platform	259.50	11 Q	291.10	8
Emily Meaney	10 m platform	257.00	12 Q	299.35	5
Maddison Keeney; Anabelle Smith	3 m springboard synchronised	—N/a		316.53	1st place, gold medalist(s)
Brittany O'Brien; Esther Qin	3 m springboard synchronised	—N/a		268.80	5
Emily Boyd; Nikita Hains	10 m platform synchronised	—N/a		275.10	6
Charli Petrov; Melissa Wu	10 m platform synchronised	—N/a		306.00	1st place, gold medalist(s)

Mixed

Athlete	Event	Final	
Athlete	Event	Points	Rank
Maddison Keeney; Li Shixin	3 m springboard synchronised	304.02	2nd place, silver medalist(s)
Anabelle Smith; Domonic Bedggood	3 m springboard synchronised	294.06	5
Melissa Wu; Domonic Bedggood	10 m platform synchronised	295.20	6
Emily Boyd; Cassiel Rousseau	10 m platform synchronised	309.60	3rd place, bronze medalist(s)

== Gymnastics ==
Thirteen gymnasts selected on 20 June 2022.

=== Artistic ===
Men
Team Final and Individual Qualification

Athlete	Event	Apparatus						Total	Rank
Athlete	Event	F	PH	R	V	PB	HB	Total	Rank
James Bacueti	Team	12.100	11.150	—N/a	14.300 Q	—N/a			
Tyson Bull	Team	—N/a	12.800	—N/a		14.050 Q	13.250	—N/a	
Clay Stephens	Team	13.400 Q	11.050	12.850	14.250	13.550	13.450	78.550	7 Q
Jesse Moore	Team	12.850 Q	13.500 Q	13.400 Q	13.550	13.900	14.150 Q	81.350	4 Q
Mitchell Morgans	Team	—N/a		10.650	—N/a	14.500 Q	13.850 Q	—N/a	
Total		38.350 (4)	37.450 (7)	36.900 (7)	42.400 (2)	42.450 (2)	41.450 (2)	239.000	4

Individual Finals

Athlete	Event	Apparatus						Total	Rank
Athlete	Event	F	PH	R	V	PB	HB	Total	Rank
Clay Stephens	All-around	12.300	11.400	12.200	14.100	13.450	13.350	76.800	11
Jesse Moore	All-around	11.800	13.650	10.600	-	-	-	DNF	
Clay Stephens	Floor	12.366	—N/a					12.366	7
Jesse Moore	Pommel horse	—N/a	13.366	—N/a				13.366	6
James Bacueti	Vault	—N/a			14.283	—N/a		14.283	3rd place, bronze medalist(s)
Tyson Bull	Parallel bars bar	—N/a				13.133	—N/a	13.133	8
Mitchell Morgans	Parallel bars bar	—N/a				13.766	—N/a	13.766	5
Tyson Bull	Horizontal bar	—N/a					14.233	14.233	2nd place, silver medalist(s)
Mitchell Morgans	Horizontal bar	—N/a					14.100	14.100	5

Women
Team Final and Individual Qualification

Athlete	Event	Apparatus				Total	Rank
Athlete	Event	V	UB	BB	F	Total	Rank
Romi Brown	Team	13.400	12.750	—N/a	12.750 Q	—N/a	
Georgia Godwin	Team	13.750 Q	13.650 Q	13.600 Q	12.650	53.650	3 Q
Kate McDonald	Team	—N/a	13.500 Q	12.950 Q	—N/a		
Breanna Scott	Team	13.100	—N/a	12.450	12.600	—N/a	
Emily Whitehead	Team	13.000 Q	12.100	11.950	12.750 Q	50.200	8 Q
Total		40.300 (2)	40.550 (2)	39.000 (2)	38.150 (3)	158.000	2nd place, silver medalist(s)

Individual Finals

Athlete	Event	Apparatus				Total	Rank
Athlete	Event	V	UB	BB	F	Total	Rank
Georgia Godwin	All-around	13.300	13.550	13.750	12.950	53.550	1st place, gold medalist(s)
Emily Whitehead	All-around	12.450	10.950	12.400	11.850	47.650	12
Georgia Godwin	Vault	13.233	—N/a			13.233	1st place, gold medalist(s)
Emily Whitehead	Vault	11.899	—N/a			11.899	8
Georgia Godwin	Uneven bars	—N/a	13.500	—N/a		13.500	2nd place, silver medalist(s)
Kate McDonald	Uneven bars	—N/a	12.533	—N/a		12.533	7
Georgia Godwin	Balance beam	—N/a		13.433	—N/a	13.433	2nd place, silver medalist(s)
Kate McDonald	Balance beam	—N/a		13.466	—N/a	13.466	1st place, gold medalist(s)
Romi Brown	Floor	—N/a			11.766	11.766	8
Emily Whitehead	Floor	—N/a			13.000	13.000	3rd place, bronze medalist(s)

=== Rhythmic ===
Team Final and Individual Qualification

Athlete	Event	Apparatus				Total	Rank
Athlete	Event	Hoop	Ball	Clubs	Ribbon	Total	Rank
Ashari Gill	Team	25.700 (13)	26.300 (12)	25.800 (15)	25.200 (13)	103.000	13
Lidiia Iakovleva	Team	26.900 (7) Q	26.050 (15)	26.900 (9)	24.350 (15)	104.200	10 Q
Alexandra Kiroi-Bogatyreva	Team	26.000 (12)	29.100 (1) Q	29.300 (2) Q	26.600 (4) Q	111.000	3 Q
Total		78.600 (4)	81.450 (2)	82.000 (1)	76.150 (3)	268.650	2nd place, silver medalist(s)

Individual Finals

Athlete	Event	Apparatus				Total	Rank
Athlete	Event	Hoop	Ball	Clubs	Ribbon	Total	Rank
Lidiia Iakovleva	All-around	28.600	26.750	27.600	24.200	107.150	7
Alexandra Kiroi-Bogatyreva	All-around	28.000	28.200	28.300	26.600	111.100	3rd place, bronze medalist(s)
Lidiia Iakovleva	Hoop	26.000	—N/a			26.000	6
Alexandra Kiroi-Bogatyreva	Ball	—N/a	28.600	—N/a		28.600	5
Alexandra Kiroi-Bogatyreva	Clubs	—N/a		29.400	—N/a	29.400	1st place, gold medalist(s)
Alexandra Kiroi-Bogatyreva	Ribbon	—N/a			26.500	26.500	5

== Hockey ==
Australia qualified for both tournaments. The men qualified as defending champions, whereas the women qualified based on their position in the FIH Women's World Ranking (as of 1 February 2022).

Detailed fixtures were released on 9 March 2022.

Summary

Key:

- FT = After full time
- P = Match decided by penalty-shootout

Team	Event	Preliminary round					Semifinal	Final / BM / PM	
Team	Event	Opposition Result	Opposition Result	Opposition Result	Opposition Result	Rank	Opposition Result	Opposition Result	Rank
Australia men	Men's tournament	Scotland; W 12–0	New Zealand; W 7–2	South Africa; W 0–3	Pakistan; W 7–0	1	England; W 3-2	India; W 7-0	1st place, gold medalist(s)
Australia women	Women's tournament	Kenya; W 8–0	South Africa; W 5–0	New Zealand; W 1–0	Scotland; W 2–0	1	India; W 1–1; 3–0^{P}	England; L 1-2	2nd place, silver medalist(s)

=== Men's tournament ===
Eighteen players selected on 21 June 2022.

Roster

- Jacob Anderson
- Daniel Beale
- Joshua Beltz
- Tim Brand
- Andrew Charter
- Matthew Dawson
- Johan Durst
- Nathan Ephraums
- Blake Govers
- Jake Harvie
- Jeremy Hayward
- Tim Howard
- Eddie Ockenden
- Flynn Ogilvie
- Joshua Simmonds
- Jake Whetton
- Tom Wickham
- Aran Zalewski

Group play

Pos	Team	Pld	W	D	L	GF	GA	GD	Pts	Qualification
1	Australia	4	4	0	0	29	2	+27	12	Semi-finals
2	South Africa	4	2	1	1	11	12	−1	7	Semi-finals
3	New Zealand	4	1	1	2	14	17	−3	4	Fifth place match
4	Pakistan	4	1	1	2	6	15	−9	4	Seventh place match
5	Scotland	4	0	1	3	11	25	−14	1	Ninth place match

Source: Birmingham 2022
Rules for classification: 1) points; 2) number of wins; 3) goal difference; 4) goals scored; 5) head-to-head results.

31 July 2022
11:00

Australia	12–0	Scotland
Govers 9'; Brand 13', 32'; Hayward 13', 25', 37', 53'; Wickham 16', 18'; Simmonds 33'; Ephraums 35', 50'	Report

Umpires:
Deepak Joshi (IND)
Bruce Bale (ENG)

1 August 2022
19:00

New Zealand	2–7	Australia
Inglis 17'; Smith 44'	Report	Anderson 8'; Govers 22', 24'; Whetton 27'; Ephraums 37'; Zalewski 44', 48'

Umpires:
Dan Barstow (ENG)
Ilanggo Kanabathu (MAS)

3 August 2022
21:00

South Africa	0–3	Australia
	Report	Whetton 4'; Zalewski 8'; Govers 55'

Umpires:
Fraser Bell (SCO)
Bruce Bale (ENG)

4 August 2022
21:00

Australia	7–0	Pakistan
Govers 12'; Hayward 19', 40'; Wickham 42', 48'; Anderson 53'; Ephramus 59'	Report

Umpires:
Peter Kabaso (KEN)
David Tomlinson (NZL)

Semi-final

6 August 2022
20:15

Australia	3–2	England
Govers 27'; Anderson 44'; Beale 50'	Report	Roper 12'; Wallace 19'

Umpires:
Sean Rapaport (RSA)
David Tomlinson (NZL)

Gold medal match

8 August 2022
12:30

Australia	7–0	India
Govers 9'; Ephraums 14', 42'; Anderson 22', 27'; Wickham 26'; Ogilvie 46'	Report

Umpires:
Dan Barstow (ENG)
David Tomlinson (NZL)

=== Women's tournament ===
Eighteen players selected on 11 June 2022. Brooke Peris and Courtney Schonel withdrew due to injuries and were replaced by Rebecca Greiner and Grace Stewart.

Roster

- Jocelyn Bartram
- Jane Claxton
- Claire Colwill
- Madison Fitzpatrick
- Rebecca Greiner
- Greta Hayes
- Stephanie Kershaw
- Amy Lawton
- Ambrosia Malone
- Kaitlin Nobbs
- Aleisha Power
- Karri Somerville
- Penny Squibb
- Grace Stewart
- Renee Taylor
- Shanea Tonkin
- Mariah Williams
- Georgia Wilson

Group play

Pos	Team	Pld	W	D	L	GF	GA	GD	Pts	Qualification
1	Australia	4	4	0	0	16	0	+16	12	Semi-finals
2	New Zealand	4	3	0	1	21	2	+19	9	Semi-finals
3	Scotland	4	2	0	2	15	5	+10	6	Fifth place match
4	South Africa	4	1	0	3	18	13	+5	3	Seventh place match
5	Kenya	4	0	0	4	0	50	−50	0	Ninth place match

Source: Birmingham 2022
Rules for classification: 1) points; 2) number of wins; 3) goal difference; 4) goals scored; 5) head-to-head results.

30 July 2022
14:00

Australia	8–0	Kenya
Nobbs 5', 12', 60'; Tonkin 5', 32'; Kershaw 15'; Colwill 25'; Stewart 36'	Report

Umpires:
Cathy Wright (WAL)
Katrina Turner (NZL)

31 July 2022
21:00

South Africa	0–5	Australia
	Report	Squibb 3', 48'; Taylor 32'; Kershaw 36'; Nobbs 46'

Umpires:
Rachel Williams (ENG)
Amber Church(NZL)

2 August 2022
09:00

New Zealand	0–1	Australia
	Report	Nobbs 9'

Umpires:
Rachel Williams (ENG)
Lelia Sacre (CAN)

3 August 2022
09:00

Australia	2–0	Scotland
Stewart 28'; Tonkin 47'	Report

Umpires:
Cathy Wright (WAL)
Amber Church (NZL)

Semi-final

5 August 2022
20:15

Australia	1–1	India
Greiner 10'	Report	Vandana 49'
Penalties
Malone (penalty shoot-out scored); Nobbs (penalty shoot-out scored); Lawton (penalty shoot-out scored)	3–0	(penalty shoot-out missed) Lalremsiami; (penalty shoot-out missed) Neha; (penalty shoot-out missed) Navneet

Umpires:
Amber Church (NZL)
Hannah Harrison (ENG)

Gold medal

7 August 2022
15:00

England	2–1	Australia
Hunt 22'; Howard 26'	Report	Malone 60'

Umpires:
Amber Church (NZL)
Wanri Venter (RSA)

== Judo ==
Twelve judokas were selected on 18 May 2022.

Men

Athlete	Event	Round of 32	Round of 16	Quarterfinals	Semifinals	Repechage	Final/BM	
Athlete	Event	Opposition Result	Opposition Result	Opposition Result	Opposition Result	Opposition Result	Opposition Result	Rank
Joshua Katz	-60 kg	Bye	Bennett (WAL); W(10–0)	Yadav (IND); W(10s1 – 0s2)	McKenzie (ENG); L (0s1 – 1s2)	—N/a	Zulu (ZAM); W (0s3-10)	3rd place, bronze medalist(s)
Nathan Katz	-66 kg	Bye	Vidot (SEY); W(10 – 0s1)	Balarjishvili (CYP); L (0s1 – 1s1)	—N/a	Varey (WAL); W (10 – 0s3)	Singh (IND); W (10s2 – 0)	3rd place, bronze medalist(s)
Jake Bensted	-73 kg	Bye	Rodman (SCO); W (10s2 – 0)	Bin Abdul Majeed (MAS); W (10s1 – 0s3)	Powell (ENG); L (10 – 0s1)	—N/a	Green (NIR); W (0–10)	3rd place, bronze medalist(s)
Uros Nikolic	-81 kg	Bye	Cumbo (VAN); W (10 – 0s1)	Moorhead (ENG); L (10s2 – 0s1)	—N/a	Connolly (NZL); W (10 – 0s2)	Fleming (NIR); W (10s1 – 1s2)	3rd place, bronze medalist(s)
Harrison Cassar	-90 kg	Bye	Bye	Shah (PAK); W (10s2 – 0s3)	Feuillet (MRI); L(10 – 0s3)	—N/a	Metois (VAN); W (0–10)	3rd place, bronze medalist(s)
Kayhan Ozcicek-Takagi	-100 kg	Bye	Bye	Thompson (ENG); L (1s3 – 10s1)	—N/a	Koster (NZL); W (0–10)	Lovett-Hewitt (ENG); L (0s3 – 10)	5
Liam Park	+100 kg	Bye	Bye	McWatt (SCO); W(0–10)	Deschenes (CAN); L (10–0)'	—N/a	Dugasse (SEY); W (0s3 – 10s1)	3rd place, bronze medalist(s)

Women

Athlete	Event	Round of 32	Round of 16	Quarterfinals	Semifinals	Repechage	Final/BM	
Athlete	Event	Opposition Result	Opposition Result	Opposition Result	Opposition Result	Opposition Result	Opposition Result	Rank
Tinka Easton	-52 kg	Bye	Bye	Asvesta (CYP); W(10s1 – 0s3)	Javadian (NIR); W(1s2 – 0s2)	—N/a	Deguchi (CAN); W (0s1-1s2)	1st place, gold medalist(s)
Katharina Haecker	-63 kg	Bye	Bye	James (NGR); W (10s2 – 0s2)	Howell (ENG); L (0s2 – 10s1)	—N/a	Semple (JAM); W (0–10)	3rd place, bronze medalist(s)
Aoife Coughlan	-70 kg	—N/a	—N/a	Asonye (NGR); W (10 – 0s2)	Yeats-Brown (ENG); W (10 – 0s3)	—N/a	Daley (JAM); W (0s3 – 10s1)	1st place, gold medalist(s)
Abigail Paduch	+78 kg	Bye	Bye	Hawkes (NIR); W (0–10)	Adlington (SCO); L (1s2 – 0s1)	—N/a	Wood (TTO); W (0–10)	3rd place, bronze medalist(s)

== Lawn bowls ==
Eighteen bowlers were selected on 3 June 2022. Grant Fehlberg withdrew due to unforeseen family circumstances and was replaced by Matthew Northcott.

Men

Athlete	Event	Group Stage					Quarterfinal	Semifinal	Final / BM	
Athlete	Event	Opposition Score	Opposition Score	Opposition Score	Opposition Score	Rank	Opposition Score	Opposition Score	Opposition Score	Rank
Aaron Wilson	Singles	Cook Islands; W 21–9	Kenya; W 21–13	Guernsey; W 21–7	South Africa; W 21–9	1 Q	England; W 21–16	Scotland; W 21–9	Northern Ireland; W 21-3	1st place, gold medalist(s)
Corey Wedlock; Aaron Wilson	Pairs	Guernsey; W 29–7	Fiji; L 16–27	South Africa; L 8–17	—N/a	3	did not advance			12
Carl Healey; Barrie Lester; Benjamin Twist	Triples	Niue; W 29–7	Cook Islands; W 25–15	Jersey; W 15–14	—N/a	1 Q	Malaysia; W 24–14	Fiji; W 26–13	England; L 12–14	2nd place, silver medalist(s)
Carl Healey; Barrie Lester; Benjamin Twist; Corey Wedlock	Fours	Niue; W 18–8	Canada; L 6–19	Northern Ireland; L 8–12	—N/a	3	did not advance			11

Women

Athlete	Event	Group Stage					Quarterfinal	Semifinal	Final / BM	
Athlete	Event	Opposition Score	Opposition Score	Opposition Score	Opposition Score	Rank	Opposition Score	Opposition Score	Opposition Score	Rank
Ellen Ryan	Singles	Kenya; W 21–7	Guernsey; L 11–21	Canada; W 17–12	—N/a	2 Q	Scotland; W 21–9	Norfolk Island; W 21–17	Guernsey; W 21–17	1st place, gold medalist(s)
Kristina Krstic; Ellen Ryan	Pairs	Brunei; W 24–14	Wales; W 21–15	Canada; W 40–6	—N/a	1 Q	Norfolk Island; W 19–12	Malaysia; W 13–11	England; W 19–18	1st place, gold medalist(s)
Lynsey Clarke; Rebecca van Asch; Natasha van Eldik	Triples	Singapore; W 22–11	Falkland Islands; W 29–8	South Africa; L 12–17	Northern Ireland; W 19–9	1 Q	New Zealand; L 10–14	did not advance		12
Lynsey Clarke; Kristina Krstic; Rebecca van Asch; Natasha van Eldik	Fours	Botswana; T 15–15	Fiji; W 16–10	Scotland; L 9–16	—N/a	3	did not advance			9

Parasport

Athlete	Event	Group Stage						Semifinal	Final / BM	
Athlete	Event	Opposition Score	Opposition Score	Opposition Score	Opposition Score	Opposition Score	Rank	Opposition Score	Opposition Score	Rank
Damien Delgado; Chris Flavel	Men's pairs B6-8	New Zealand; L 7–17	South Africa; T 12–12	England; L 12–13	Scotland; W 21–15	Wales; W 15–11	3	England; W 17–4	Scotland; L7–17	2nd place, silver medalist(s)
Serena Bonnell; Cheryl Lindfield	Women's pairs B6-8	Scotland; W 16–15	South Africa; W 18–7	New Zealand; W 19–8	England; L 5–22	—N/a	3	South Africa; W 19–12	Scotland; L 5–17	2nd place, silver medalist(s)
Helen Boardman directed by Peter Doherty; Jake Fehlberg directed by Matthew Northcott	Mixed pairs B2-3	New Zealand; W 25―9	England; W 14―11	Scotland; L 8–10	Wales; W 18–13	South Africa; W 16–12	2	Wales; L 10–13	England; L 11–14	4

== Netball ==
By virtue of its position in the World Netball Rankings (as of 28 July 2021), Australia qualified for the tournament. Partial fixtures were announced in November 2021, then updated with the remaining qualifiers in March 2022. Twelve players were selected on 14 June 2022 with three travelling reserves – Donnell Wallam, Jamie-Lee Price, Ruby Bakewell-Doran.

Roster

- Sunday Aryang
- Kiera Austin
- Ash Brazill
- Courtney Bruce
- Gretel Bueta
- Paige Hadley
- Sarah Klau
- Cara Koenen
- Kate Moloney
- Liz Watson (c)
- Jo Weston
- Steph Wood (vc)

Summary

Team	Event	Group stage						Semifinal	Final / BM / Cl.	
Team	Event	Opposition Result	Opposition Result	Opposition Result	Opposition Result	Opposition Result	Rank	Opposition Result	Opposition Result	Rank
Australia women	Women's tournament	Barbados; W 95–18	Scotland; W 83–30	South Africa; W 74–49	Wales; W 79–33	Jamaica; L 55–57	2	England; W 60-51	Jamaica; W 55-51	1st place, gold medalist(s)

Group stage

Pos	Team	Pld	W	D	L	GF	GA	GD	Pts	Qualification
1	Jamaica	5	5	0	0	378	205	+173	10	Semi-finals
2	Australia	5	4	0	1	386	187	+199	8	Semi-finals
3	South Africa	5	3	0	2	323	275	+48	6	Classification matches
4	Wales	5	2	0	3	235	306	−71	4	Classification matches
5	Scotland	5	1	0	4	224	302	−78	2	Classification matches
6	Barbados	5	0	0	5	150	421	−271	0	Classification matches

Source: Birmingham 2022

29 July 2022; 14:00	Report	Australia	95–18	Barbados	National Exhibition Centre; Umpires: Gary Burgess; Alison Harrison
29 July 2022; 14:00	Report	Austin 6/6 (100%); Bueta 44/48 (92%); Koenen 35/38 (92%); Wood 10/15 (67%)		Agard 4/7 (57%); Blackman 6/8 (75%); Holder 2/3 (67%); Wharton 6/13 (46%)	National Exhibition Centre; Umpires: Gary Burgess; Alison Harrison

30 July 2022; 12:00	Report	Australia	83–30	Scotland	National Exhibition Centre; Umpires: Tracy-Ann Griffiths; Anso Kemp
30 July 2022; 12:00	Report	Austin 10/13 (77%); Bueta 33/34 (97%); Koenen 36/37 (97%); Wood 4/4 (100%)		Barrie 7/8 (88%); Goodwin 15/16 (94%); Love 2/4 (50%); McCall 6/10 (60%)	National Exhibition Centre; Umpires: Tracy-Ann Griffiths; Anso Kemp

1 August 2022; 12:00	Report	Australia	74–49	South Africa	National Exhibition Centre; Umpires: Gareth Fowler; Angela Armstrong-Lush
1 August 2022; 12:00	Report	Austin 12/14 (86%); Bueta 34/34 (100%); Koenen 14/14 (100%); Wood 14/14 (100%)		Rademan 4/5 (80%); Taljaard 4/5 (80%) van der Berg 10/10 (100%); Venter 31/38 (82%)	National Exhibition Centre; Umpires: Gareth Fowler; Angela Armstrong-Lush

2 August 2022; 12:00	Report	Australia	79–33	Wales	National Exhibition Centre; Umpires: Gareth Fowler; Louise Travis
2 August 2022; 12:00	Report	Bueta 26/27 (96%); Koenen 49/54 (91%); Wood 4/4 (100%)		Creak 11/11 (100%); Roberts 6/11 (55%); Rowe 16/18 (89%)	National Exhibition Centre; Umpires: Gareth Fowler; Louise Travis

4 August 2022; 09:00	Report	Australia	55–57	Jamaica	National Exhibition Centre; Umpires: Gareth Fowler; Angela Armstrong-Lush
4 August 2022; 09:00	Report	Bueta 36/39 (92%); Wood 19/22 (86%)		Beckford 10/10 (100%); Fowler 47/50 (94%)	National Exhibition Centre; Umpires: Gareth Fowler; Angela Armstrong-Lush

Semi-final

6 August 2022; 14:30	Report	England	51–60	Australia	National Exhibition Centre; Umpires: Gareth Fowler; Angela Armstrong-Lush
6 August 2022; 14:30	Report	Cardwell 22/24 (92%); Harten 16/17 (94%); Housby 13/14 (93%)		Bueta 43/44 (98%); Wood 17/20 (85%)	National Exhibition Centre; Umpires: Gareth Fowler; Angela Armstrong-Lush

Gold medal match

7 August 2022; 20:30	Report	Jamaica	51–55	Australia	National Exhibition Centre; Umpires: Gareth Fowler; Angela Armstrong-Lush
7 August 2022; 20:30	Report	Scoring by quarter: 12–14, 17–15, 10–16, 12–10			National Exhibition Centre; Umpires: Gareth Fowler; Angela Armstrong-Lush
7 August 2022; 20:30	Report	Beckford 5/5 (100%); Fowler 46/47 (98%)		Bueta 37/37 (100%); Koenen 15/15 (100%); Wood 3/5 (60%)	National Exhibition Centre; Umpires: Gareth Fowler; Angela Armstrong-Lush

== Para powerlifting ==
Two athletes selected on 15 June 2022.

Athlete	Event	Result	Rank
Ben Wright	Men's heavyweight	119.1	(bronze)
Hani Watson	Women's heavyweight	98.5	3rd place, bronze medalist(s)

== Rugby sevens ==
Australia qualified for both the men's and women's tournaments. This was achieved through their positions in the 2018–19 / 2019–20 World Rugby Sevens Series and 2018–19 / 2019–20 World Rugby Women's Sevens Series respectively.

Summary

team	Event	Preliminary round				Quarterfinal / CQ	Semifinal / CS	Final / BM / PF	
team	Event	Opposition Result	Opposition Result	Opposition Result	Rank	Opposition Result	Opposition Result	Opposition Result	Rank
Australia men	Men's tournament	Jamaica; W 62–0	Uganda; D 12–12	Kenya; W 7–5	1 Q	Samoa; W 7–0	South Africa; L 12–24	New Zealand; L 12–26	4
Australia women	Women's tournament	South Africa; W 38–0	Scotland; W 50–0	Fiji; L 12–19	2 Q	—N/a	New Zealand; W 17–12	Fiji; W 22–12	1st place, gold medalist(s)

=== Men's tournament ===
Thirteen players were selected on 5 July 2022.

Roster

- Ben Dowling
- Matthew Gonzalez
- Henry Hutchison
- Samu Kerevi
- Nathan Lawson
- Maurice Longbottom
- Nick Malouf
- Benn Marr
- Mark Nawaqanitawase
- Henry Paterson
- Dietrich Roache
- Corey Toole
- Josh Turner

Pool D

Pos	Team	Pld	W	D	L	PF	PA	PD	Pts	Qualification
1	Australia	3	2	1	0	81	17	+64	8	Advance to Quarter-finals
2	Kenya	3	2	0	1	77	21	+56	7	Advance to Quarter-finals
3	Uganda	3	1	1	1	66	39	+27	6	Advance to classification Quarter-finals
4	Jamaica	3	0	0	3	0	147	−147	3	Advance to classification Quarter-finals

Updated to match(es) played on 29 July 2022. Source: Birmingham2022
Rules for classification: 1) Points; 2) Head-to-head result; 3) Point difference; 4) Points scored.

29 July 2022
10:28

Australia	62–0	Jamaica
Try: Kerevi (3) 1' m, 5' c, 6' c Lawson (2) 2' c, 12' c Toole 4' c Roache 9' m Malouf 10' c Longbottom 11' m Nawaqanitawase 14' m Con: Dowling (4/5) 2', 4', 6', 7'; Roache (2/5) 10', 12'	Report

Coventry Stadium, Coventry
Referee: Nick Hogan (New Zealand)

29 July 2022
19:20

Australia	12–12	Uganda
Try: Malouf 4' m Hutchison 9' c Con: Longbottom (0/1); Roache (1/1) 10'; Cards: Longbottom (yellow card) 11'; Roache (yellow card) 12'	Report	Try: Ayera 7' c Wokorach 12' m Con: Wokorach (1/2) 7'; Cards: Wokorach (0/1)

Coventry Stadium, Coventry
Referee: Morné Ferreira (South Africa)

30 July 2022
10:50

Australia	7–5	Kenya
Try: Toole 10' c Con: Roache (1/1) 11'; Cards: Nawaqanitawase (yellow card) 1'; Lawson (yellow card) 8'	Report	Try: Otieno 2' m Cards: Mwale (yellow card) 4'

Coventry Stadium, Coventry
Referee: Finlay Brown (Scotland)

Quarter-final

30 July 2022
21:32

Australia	7–0	Samoa
Try: Gonzalez 8' c Con: Roache (1/1) 8'; Cards: Malouf (yellow card) 10'	Report

Coventry Stadium, Coventry
Referee: Nick Hogan (New Zealand)

Semi–finals

31 July 2022
13:04

Australia	12–24	South Africa
Try: Nawaqanitawase 1' m Gonzalez 6' c Con: Roache (1/2) 6'; Cards: Hutchison (yellow card) 7'	Report	Try: A. Davids (3) 4' c, 7' m, 12' m S. Davids 8' c Con: Brown (1/1) 4'; A. Davids (0/1); S. Davids (1/1) 8'; Williams (0/1)

Coventry Stadium, Coventry
Referee: Adam Leal (England)

Bronze medal match

31 July 2022
20:12

New Zealand	26-12	Australia
Try: Carter (2) 0' c, 11' m Leo (2) 6' c, 9' c Con: McGarvey-Black (3/4) 1', 6', 9'	Report	Try: Turner 4' c Paterson 13' m Con: Roache (1/2) 4'

Coventry Stadium, Coventry
Referee: Ben Breakspear (Wales)

=== Women's tournament ===
Thirteen players were selected on 5 July 2022.

Roster

- Charlotte Caslick
- Lily Dick
- Dominique Du Toit
- Demi Hayes
- Madison Ashby
- Tia Hinds
- Alysia Lefau-Fakaosilea
- Maddison Levi
- Teagan Levi
- Faith Nathan
- Sariah Paki
- Jesse Southwell
- Sharni Williams

Pool B

Pos	Team	Pld	W	D	L	PF	PA	PD	Pts	Qualification
1	Fiji	3	3	0	0	91	24	+67	9	Semi-finals
2	Australia	3	2	0	1	100	19	+81	7	Semi-finals
3	Scotland	3	1	0	2	45	93	−48	5	Classification semi-finals
4	South Africa	3	0	0	3	12	112	−100	3	Classification semi-finals

Updated to match(es) played on 29 July 2022. Source: Birmingham2022
Rules for classification: 1) Points; 2) Head-to-head result; 3) Point difference; 4) Points scored.

29 July 2022
09:00

Australia	38–0	South Africa
Try: Levi (2) 1' c, 6' c Nathan 2' m Caslick (2) 4' c, 8' c Ashby 14' m Con: Hinds (3/4) 1', 5', 6'; Williams (0/1)	Report

Coventry Stadium, Coventry
Referee: Hollie Davidson (Scotland)

29 July 2022
17:52

Australia	50–0	Scotland
Try: Levi (3) 1' c, 7' c, 9' m Paki (2) 3' c, 10' m Williams 6' c Nathan 8' m Southwell 13' c Con: Hinds (2/2) 2', 4'; Williams (2/5) 7', 7'; Southwell (1/1) 13'	Report

Coventry Stadium, Coventry
Referee: Selica Winiata (New Zealand)

30 July 2022
09:22

Australia	12–19	Fiji
Try: Levi 12' m Hayes 13' c Con: Williams (0/1); Southwell (1/1) 14'	Report	Try: Nagasau 1' m Donu 3' c Daveua 9' c Con: Naimasi (0/1); Riwai (2/2) 4', 9'; Cards: Uluinisau (yellow card) 13'

Coventry Stadium, Coventry
Referee: Lauren Jenner (New Zealand)

Semi-final

30 July 2022
19:42

New Zealand	12–17	Australia
Try: Woodman 4' m Fitzpatrick 6' c Con: Nathan-Wong (1/2) 7'	Report	Try: Levi (3) 1' m, 9' m, 12' c Con: Williams (0/2); Du Toit (1/1) 12'; Cards: Levi (yellow card) 14'

Coventry Stadium, Coventry
Referee: Hollie Davidson (Scotland)

Gold medal

31 July 2022
20:38

Australia	22–12	Fiji
Try: Nathan (2) 1' m, 3' m Ashby 6' c Levi 8' m Con: Williams (1/4) 6'; Cards: Caslick (yellow card) 13'	Report	Try: Naimasi 9' c Donu 14' m Con: Naimasi (1/1) 9'; Cavuru (0/1)

Coventry Stadium, Coventry
Referee: Hollie Davidson (Scotland)

== Squash ==
Eight players – four men and four women selected on 10 June 2022.

Singles

Athlete	Event	Round of 64	Round of 32	Round of 16	Quarterfinals	Semifinals	Final	
Athlete	Event	Opposition Score	Opposition Score	Opposition Score	Opposition Score	Opposition Score	Opposition Score	Rank
Rhys Dowling	Men's singles	Doyle (SVG); W 3–0	Yuen (MAS); L 1–3	did not advance				17
Rachael Grinham	Women's singles	—N/a	Lobban (AUS); L 1–3	did not advance				17
Donna Lobban	Women's singles	—N/a	Grinham (AUS); W 3–1	Whitlock (WAL); L 0–3	did not advance			9
Jessica Turnbull	Women's singles	—N/a	Sultana (MLT); W 3–1	Turmel (ENG); L 1–3	did not advance			9

Doubles

Athlete	Event	Round of 32	Round of 16	Quarterfinals	Semifinals	Final	
Athlete	Event	Opposition Score	Opposition Score	Opposition Score	Opposition Score	Opposition Score	Rank
Rhys Dowling; Cameron Pilley	Men's doubles	Bye	Laksiri / Wakeel (SRI); W 2–0	Willstrop / James (ENG); L 0–2	did not advance		5
Zac Alexander; Ryan Cuskelly	Men's doubles	Jervis / Kelly (CAY); W 2–0	Morrison / Binnie (JAM); W 2–0	Lobban / Stewart (SCO); L 0–2	did not advance		5
Rachael Grinham; Donna Lobban	Women's doubles	Bye	Kuruvilla / Singh (IND); W 2–0	Arnold / Azman (MAS); L 1–2	did not advance		5
Alex Haydon; Jessica Turnbull	Women's doubles	Bye	Kennedy / Termel (ENG); L 0–2	did not advance			9
Donna Lobban; Cameron Pilley	Mixed doubles	Alarcos / Siaguru (PNG); W 2–0	Chinappa / Sandhu (IND); W 2–0	Aitken / Lobban (SCO); W 2–1	Waters / Waller (ENG); L 0-2	Pallikal / Ghosal (IND); L 0-2	4
Rachael Grinham; Zac Alexander	Mixed doubles	Pitcairn / Kelly (CAY); W 2–0	Kennedy / Rooney (ENG); W 2–0	Pallikal / Ghosal (IND); L 0–2	did not advance		5

== Swimming ==
A squad of twenty-seven para swimmers was selected on 4 May 2022, all having qualified via the World Para Swimming World Rankings for performances registered between 31 December 2020 and 18 April 2022. Forty six able bodied swimmers were selected on 22 May 2022. Three additional Para swimmers selected on 7 July 2022. Two swimmers – Isaac Cooper and Timothy Disken were withdrawn from the team on 19 July 2022.

Athletes listed in events are subject to change up to the close of entries.

Men

Athlete	Event	Heat		Semifinal		Final	
Athlete	Event	Time	Rank	Time	Rank	Time	Rank
Grayson Bell	50 m freestyle	22.64	9 Q	22.55	8 Q	22.53	8
Thomas Nowakowski	50 m freestyle	22.42	2 Q	22.20	4 Q	22.37	6
Flynn Southam	50 m freestyle	22.79	12 Q	22.60	10	did not advance	
Matt Levy	50 m freestyle S7	—N/a				28.95	1st place, gold medalist(s)
Joel Mundie	50 m freestyle S7	—N/a				32.13	6
Braedan Jason	50 m freestyle S13	—N/a				24.56	4
Oscar Stubbs	50 m freestyle S13	—N/a				24.90	5
Jacob Templeton	50 m freestyle S13	—N/a				24.47	3rd place, bronze medalist(s)
Kyle Chalmers	100 m freestyle	48.98	6 Q	47.36 GR	1 Q	47.51	1st place, gold medalist(s)
Zac Incerti	100 m freestyle	48.84	3 Q	48.91	8 Q	49.09	8
William Yang	100 m freestyle	49.49	10 Q	48.38	3 Q	48.55	5
Mack Horton	200 m freestyle	1:47.37	4 Q	—N/a		1:46.78	4
Zac Incerti	200 m freestyle	1:49.54	15	—N/a		did not advance	
Elijah Winnington	200 m freestyle	1:46.87	1 Q	—N/a		1:45.62	3rd place, bronze medalist(s)
Benjamin Hance	200 m freestyle S14	—N/a				1:55.50	2nd place, silver medalist(s)
Jack Ireland	200 m freestyle S14	—N/a				1:56.15	3rd place, bronze medalist(s)
Liam Schluter	200 m freestyle S14	—N/a				1:59.17	8
Mack Horton	400 m freestyle	3:47.54	2 Q	—N/a		3:46.49	3rd place, bronze medalist(s)
Samuel Short	400 m freestyle	3:48.46	4 Q	—N/a		3:45.07	2nd place, silver medalist(s)
Elijah Winnington	400 m freestyle	3:48.32	3 Q	—N/a		3:43.06	1st place, gold medalist(s)
Kieren Pollard	1500 m freestyle	15:23.46	2 Q	—N/a		15:18.02	5
Samuel Short	1500 m freestyle	15:02.66	1 Q	—N/a		14:48.54	1st place, gold medalist(s)
Ben Armbruster	50 m backstroke	25.18	3 Q	25.21	3 Q	25.37	5
Mitch Larkin	50 m backstroke	25.52	8 Q	25.53	11	did not advance	
Bradley Woodward	50 m backstroke	25.39	6 Q	25.25	4 Q	25.08	4
Joshua Edwards-Smith	100 m backstroke	54.97	8 Q	54.78	8 Q	54.63	8
Mitch Larkin	100 m backstroke	54.85	7 Q	54.26	6 Q	54.30	6
Bradley Woodward	100 m backstroke	54.54	3 Q	54.02	4 Q	54.06	3rd place, bronze medalist(s)
Brenden Hall	100 m backstroke S9	—N/a				1:05.90	5
Timothy Hodge	100 m backstroke S9	—N/a				1:01.88 GR	1st place, gold medalist(s)
Harrison Vig	100 m backstroke S9	—N/a				1:05.40	4
Joshua Edwards-Smith	200 m backstroke	1:58.74	6 Q	—N/a		1:57.50	6
Mitch Larkin	200 m backstroke	1:59.59	7 Q	—N/a		1:56.91	4
Bradley Woodward	200 m backstroke	1:57.99	3 Q	—N/a		1:56.41	2nd place, silver medalist(s)
Grayson Bell	50 m breaststroke	27.63	5 Q	27.65	5 Q	28.31	8
Samuel Williamson	50 m breaststroke	27.20	3 Q	27.01	1 Q	26.97	2nd place, silver medalist(s)
Joshua Yong	50 m breaststroke	27.96	11 Q	27.85	12	did not advance	
Zac Stubblety-Cook	100 m breaststroke	1:00.18	3 Q	59.80	2 Q	59.52	2nd place, silver medalist(s)
Samuel Williamson	100 m breaststroke	1:00.16	2 Q	59.98	4 Q	59.82	3rd place, bronze medalist(s)
Josh Yong	100 m breaststroke	1:00.93	6 Q	59.99	5 Q	1:00.60	7
Blake Cochrane	100 m breaststroke SB8	—N/a				1:18.97	3rd place, bronze medalist(s)
Timothy Hodge	100 m breaststroke SB8	—N/a				1:14.19	2nd place, silver medalist(s)
Zac Stubblety-Cook	200 m breaststroke	2:09.88	1 Q	—N/a		2:08.07	1st place, gold medalist(s)
Matthew Wilson	200 m breaststroke	2:12.02	4 Q	—N/a		2:10.57	4
Kyle Chalmers	50 m butterfly	23.45	1 Q	23.65	10	did not advance	
Cody Simpson	50 m butterfly	23.84	10 Q	23.87	14	did not advance	
Matthew Temple	50 m butterfly	23.70	5 Q	23.63	9	did not advance	
Cody Simpson	100 m butterfly	52.47	5 Q	52.16	5 Q	52.06	5
Matthew Temple	100 m butterfly	52.28	4 Q	51.52	1 Q	51.40	3rd place, bronze medalist(s)
William Martin	100 m butterfly S10	—N/a				58.73	4
Col Pearse	100 m butterfly S10	—N/a				56.91	1st place, gold medalist(s)
Alex Saffy	100 m butterfly S10	—N/a				57.53	2nd place, silver medalist(s)
Bowen Gough	200 m butterfly	1:57.53	4 Q	—N/a		1:56.84	4
Kieren Pollard	200 m butterfly	1:58.99	9	—N/a		did not advance	
Brendon Smith	200 m butterfly	1:58.86	8 Q	—N/a		2:00.24	8
Se-Bom Lee	200 m individual medley	2:00.62	4 Q	—N/a		1:59.86	6
Mitch Larkin	200 m individual medley	2:01.59	9	—N/a		did not advance	
Brendon Smith	200 m individual medley	2:01.17	7	—N/a		1:59.57	5
Se-Bom Lee	400 m individual medley	4:19.66	6 Q	—N/a		4:16.68	5
Kieren Pollard	400 m individual medley	4:19.64	5 Q	—N/a		4:17.02	6
Brendon Smith	400 m individual medley	4:18.32	2 Q	—N/a		4:10.15	2nd place, silver medalist(s)
Flynn Southam; Zac Incerti; William Yang; Kyle Chalmers; Matthew Temple (heat); Cody Simpson (heat); Elijah Winnington (heat)	4 × 100 m freestyle relay	3:15.64	1 Q	—N/a		3:11.12 GR	1st place, gold medalist(s)
Elijah Winnington; Flynn Southam; Zac Incerti; Mack Horton	4 × 200 m freestyle relay	—N/a				7:04.96 GR	1st place, gold medalist(s)
Bradley Woodward; Zac Stubblety-Cook; Matthew Temple; Kyle Chalmers; Mitch Larkin (heat); Samuel Williamson (heat); Cody Simpson (heat); Willam Yang (heat)	4 × 100 m medley relay	3:34.35	1 Q	—N/a		3:31.88	2nd place, silver medalist(s)

Women

Athlete	Event	Heat		Semifinal		Final	
Athlete	Event	Time	Rank	Time	Rank	Time	Rank
Meg Harris	50 m freestyle	24.57	3 Q	24.41	2 Q	24.32	2nd place, silver medalist(s)
Shayna Jack	50 m freestyle	24.31	1 Q	24.33	1 Q	24.36	3rd place, bronze medalist(s)
Emma McKeon	50 m freestyle	24.52	2 Q	24.51	3 Q	23.99	1st place, gold medalist(s)
Katja Dedekind	50 m freestyle S13	—N/a				26.56 WR	1st place, gold medalist(s)
Kirralee Hayes	50 m freestyle S13	—N/a				28.24	3rd place, bronze medalist(s)
Jenna Jones	50 m freestyle S13	—N/a				29.08	4
Shayna Jack	100 m freestyle	55.20	3 Q	53.43	3	52.88	2nd place, silver medalist(s)
Emma McKeon	100 m freestyle	55.36	6 Q	53.12	1 Q	52.94	3rd place, bronze medalist(s)
Mollie O'Callaghan	100 m freestyle	54.28	1 Q	53.33	2 Q	52.63	1st place, gold medalist(s)
Emily Beecroft	100 m freestyle S9	1:05.93	4 Q	—N/a		1:03.74	2nd place, silver medalist(s)
Ellie Cole	100 m freestyle S9	1:04.87	3 Q	—N/a		1:04.21	5
Ashleigh McConnell	100 m freestyle S9	1:06.76	5 Q	—N/a		1:04.12	4
Mollie O'Callaghan	200 m freestyle	1:56.65	2 Q	—N/a		1:54.01	2nd place, silver medalist(s)
Ariarne Titmus	200 m freestyle	1:55.68	1 Q	—N/a		1:53.89 GR	1st place, gold medalist(s)
Madison Wilson	200 m freestyle	1:56.93	3 Q	—N/a		1:56.17	3rd place, bronze medalist(s)
Jade Lucy	200 m freestyle S14	—N/a				2:16.64	7
Madeleine McTernan	200 m freestyle S14	—N/a				2:13.89	5
Ruby Storm	200 m freestyle S14	—N/a				2:15.75	6
Kiah Melverton	400 m freestyle	4:11.04	6Q	—N/a		4:03.12	3rd place, bronze medalist(s)
Lani Pallister	400 m freestyle	4:09.77	4Q	—N/a		4:04.43	5
Ariarne Titmus	400 m freestyle	4:08.25	3Q	—N/a		3:58.06	1st place, gold medalist(s)
Kiah Melverton	800 m freestyle	8:40.29	4 Q	—N/a		8:16.79	2nd place, silver medalist(s)
Lani Pallister	800 m freestyle	8:32.67	1 Q	—N/a		8:19.16	3rd place, bronze medalist(s)
Ariarne Titmus	800 m freestyle	8:36.17	2 Q	—N/a		8:13.59 GR	1st place, gold medalist(s)
Kaylee McKeown	50 m backstroke	28.09	4 Q	27.75	3 Q	27.58	3rd place, bronze medalist(s)
Bronte Job	50 m backstroke	27.65	2 Q	27.79	5 Q	27.85	6
Mollie O'Callaghan	50 m backstroke	28.13	5 Q	27.76	4 Q	27.47	2nd place, silver medalist(s)
Minna Atherton	100 m backstroke	1:00.65	4 Q	1:00.50	5 Q	1:00.02	4
Kaylee McKeown	100 m backstroke	59.58	2 Q	59.08	2 Q	58.60 GR	1st place, gold medalist(s)
Isabella Vincent	100 m backstroke S8	—N/a				1:27.47	5
Ella Jones	100 m backstroke S8	—N/a				1:28.94	6
Minna Atherton	200 m backstroke	2:11.38	3 Q	—N/a		2:09.40	4
Kaylee McKeown	200 m backstroke	2:10.95	1 Q	—N/a		2:05.60 GR	1st place, gold medalist(s)
Abbey Harkin	50 m breaststroke	31.48	8 Q	31.39	7 Q	31.20	7
Chelsea Hodges	50 m breaststroke	30.66	3 Q	30.50	3 Q	30.05	3rd place, bronze medalist(s)
Jenna Strauch	50 m breaststroke	30.77	5 Q	30.89	4 Q	30.85	5
Abbey Harkin	100 m breaststroke	1:07.85	6 Q	1:07.61	6 Q	1:07.47	5
Chelsea Hodges	100 m breaststroke	1:07.68	4 Q	1:07.16	3 Q	1:07.05	3rd place, bronze medalist(s)
Jenna Strauch	100 m breaststroke	1:07.80	5 Q	1:07.30	4 Q	1:07.60	6
Ella Jones	100 m breaststroke SB6	—N/a				1:56.14	6
Isabella Vincent	100 m breaststroke SB6	—N/a				1:52.74	5
Abbey Harkin	200 m breaststroke	2:26.11	5 Q	—N/a		2:24.07	5
Taylor McKeown	200 m breaststroke	2:28.15	7 Q	—N/a		2:25.50	6
Jenna Strauch	200 m breaststroke	2:24.97	2 Q	—N/a		2:23.65	2nd place, silver medalist(s)
Holly Barratt	50 m butterfly	26.86	7 Q	26.28	4 Q	26.05	3rd place, bronze medalist(s)
Emma McKeon	50 m butterfly	26.65	4 Q	26.02	1 Q	25.90	1st place, gold medalist(s)
Alexandria Perkins	50 m butterfly	26.73	6 Q	26.29	5 Q	26.19	5
Emma McKeon	100 m butterfly	57.34	1 Q	57.49	1 Q	56.38	2nd place, silver medalist(s)
Alexandria Perkins	100 m butterfly	58.55	4 Q	58.22	4 Q	57.87	4
Brianna Throssell	100 m butterfly	58.40	3 Q	57.99	3 Q	57.50	3rd place, bronze medalist(s)
Abbey Connor	200 m butterfly	2:09.69	3 Q	—N/a		2:08.36	4
Elizabeth Dekkers	200 m butterfly	2:07.62	1 Q	—N/a		2:07.26	1st place, gold medalist(s)
Brianna Throssell	200 m butterfly	2:10.92	5 Q	—N/a		2:08.3	3rd place, bronze medalist(s)
Abbey Harkin	200 m individual medley	2:13.24	4 Q	—N/a		2:12.25	5
Kaylee McKeown	200 m individual medley	2:14.23	7 Q	—N/a		2:09.52	2nd place, silver medalist(s)
Ella Ramsay	200 m individual medley	2:14.03	6 Q	—N/a		2:14.71	8
Jasmine Greenwood	200 m individual medley SM10	—N/a				2:33.29	1st place, gold medalist(s)
Lakeisha Patterson	200 m individual medley SM10	—N/a				2:42.25	5
Keira Stephens	200 m individual medley SM10	—N/a				2:36.68	3rd place, bronze medalist(s)
Jenna Forrester	400 m individual medley	4:46.28	8 Q	—N/a		4:41.80	6
Kiah Melverton	400 m individual medley	4:41.44	2 Q	—N/a		4:36.78	2nd place, silver medalist(s)
Madison Wilson; Shayna Jack; Mollie O'Callaghan; Emma McKeon	4 × 100 m freestyle relay	—N/a				3:30.64	1st place, gold medalist(s)
Madison Wilson; Kiah Melverton; Mollie O'Callaghan; Ariarne Titmus	4 × 200 m freestyle relay	—N/a				7:39.29 WR	1st place, gold medalist(s)
Kaylee McKeown; Chelsea Hodges; Emma McKeon; Mollie O'Callaghan	4 × 100 m medley relay	—N/a				3:54.44	1st place, gold medalist(s)

Mixed

Athlete	Event	Heat		Semifinal		Final	
Athlete	Event	Time	Rank	Time	Rank	Time	Rank
Kyle Chalmers; William Yang; Emma McKeon; Mollie O'Callaghan; Zac Incerti (heat); Flynn Southam (heat); Meg Harris (heat); Madison Wilson (heat)	4 × 100 m freestyle relay	3:22.14	1 Q	—N/a		3:21.18 GR	1st place, gold medalist(s)
Kaylee McKeown; Zac Stubblety-Cook; Matthew Temple; Emma McKeon; Mitchell Larkin (heat) Samuel Williamson (heat) Alexandria Perkins (heat) Madison Wilson (heat)	4 × 100 m medley relay	3:45.34	1 Q	—N/a		3:41.30 GR	1st place, gold medalist(s)

== Table tennis ==
Team of six athletes was announced on 29 April 2022. Eight athletes select ed on 30 May 2022.

Singles

Athletes	Event	Group stage				Round of 32	Round of 16	Quarterfinal	Semifinal	Final / BM	
Athletes	Event	Opposition Score	Opposition Score	Opposition Score	Rank	Opposition Score	Opposition Score	Opposition Score	Opposition Score	Opposition Score	Rank
Dillon Chambers	Men's singles	Sotomayor (FLK); W 4–0	Cogill (RSA); W 4–0	—N/a	1	Chew (SGP); L 3–4	did not advance				17
Nicholas Lum	Men's singles	Bye				Choong (MAS); W 4–0	Gnanasekaran (IND); L 2–4	did not advance			9
Finn Luu	Men's singles	Wilson (NIR); W 4–0	van Lane (GUY); W 4–0	—N/a	1	Achanta (IND); L 0–4	did not advance				17
Junjian Chen	Men's singles C3–5	Hunter-Spivey (ENG); L 0–3	Mudassar (CAN); L 2–3	Sule (NGR); L 0–3	4	did not advance					
Lin Ma	Men's singles C8–10	Syed (CAN); W 3–0	Wilson (ENG); W 3–0	Olufemi (NGR); W 3–0	1	—N/a			Olufemi (NGR); W 3–0	Stacey (WAL); L 2-3	2nd place, silver medalist(s)
Minhyung Jee	Women's singles	Bye				Nazim (MDV); W 4–0	Batra (IND); L 0–4	did not advance			9
Jian Fang Lay	Women's singles	Bye				Moran (CAN); W 4–0	Edem (NGR); W 4–1	Feng (SGP); L 0–4	did not advance		5
Yangzi Liu	Women's singles	Bye				Ho (MAS); W 4–3	Ho (ENG); W 4–0	Hursey (WAL); W 4–1	Zeng (SGP); L 2–4	Akula (IND); W 4–3	3rd place, bronze medalist(s)
Daniela di Toro	Women's singles C3–5	Patel (IND); L 1–3	Latu (FIJ); W 3–0	Ikpeoyi (NGR); L 1–3	3	—N/a			did not advance		
Amanda Tscharke	Women's singles C3–5	Obiora (NGR); L 0–3	Patel (IND); L 0–3	Bailey (ENG); L 0–3	4	—N/a			did not advance		
Li Na Lei	Women's singles C6–10	Williams (WAL); W 3–0	Pickard (ENG); W 3–0	Olo (SOL); W 3–0	1	—N/a			Obazuaye (NGR); W 3–0	Qian Yang (AUS); L 1–3	2nd place, silver medalist(s)
Qian Yang	Women's singles C6–10	Sze (MAS); W 3–0	Obazuaye (NGR); W 3–1	Ravi (IND); W 3–0	1	—N/a			Pickard (ENG); W 3–0	Li Na Lei (AUS); W 3–1	1st place, gold medalist(s)

Doubles

Athletes	Event	Round of 64	Round of 32	Round of 16	Quarterfinal	Semifinal	Final / BM	
Athletes	Event	Opposition Score	Opposition Score	Opposition Score	Opposition Score	Opposition Score	Opposition Score	Rank
Dillon Chambers; Xin Yan	Men's doubles	Bye	Asante; Ofori (GHA); W 3–0	Harmeet Desai; Shetty (IND); L 1–3	did not advance			9
Nicholas Lum; Finn Luu	Men's doubles	Bye	Abrefa; Commey (GHA); W 3–1	Hazin; Ly (CAN); W 3–1	Abiodun; Aruna (NGR); W 3–2	Sharath; Gnanasekaran (IND); L 2–3	Chu; Po (SGP); L 1-3	4
Yangzi Liu; Chunyi Feng	Women's doubles	Bye	Delpesche; McCarter (SVG); W 3–0	Cummings; Edghill (GUY); W 3–0	Feng; Zeng (SGP); L 1–3	did not advance		5
Jian Fang Lay; Minhyung Jee	Women's doubles	Bye	Choong; Lyne (MAS); W 3–2	Ho; Tsaptsinos (ENG); W 3–1	Bello; Edem (NGR); W 3–0	Wong; Zhou (SGP); W 3-0	Feng; Zeng (SGP); L 0–3	2nd place, silver medalist(s)
Finn Luu; Yangzi Liu	Mixed doubles	Bye	Dalgleish; Plaistow (SCO); W 3–0	Abiodun; Bello (NGR); W 3–0	Chew; Zeng (SGP); L 0–3	did not advance		5
Jian Fang Lay; Xin Yan	Mixed doubles	Choong; Lyne (MAS); L 1–3	did not advance					33
Nicholas Lum; Minhyung Jee	Mixed doubles	Bye	Cogill; Maphanga (RSA); W 3–1	Abrefa; Kwani (GHA); W 3–0	Jarvis; Bardsley (ENG); W 3–0	Achanta; Akula (IND); L 2–3	Chew; Zeng (SGP); L 1-3	4

Team

Athletes	Event	Group stage				Quarterfinal	Semifinal	Final / BM	
Athletes	Event	Opposition Score	Opposition Score	Opposition Score	Rank	Opposition Score	Opposition Score	Opposition Score	Rank
Dillon Chambers; Nicholas Lum; Fin Luu; Xin Yan	Men's team	Malaysia; L 1–3	Canada; W 3–2	Mauritius; W 3–0	3	did not advance			
Jian Fang Lay; Yangzi Liu; Minhyung Jee; Chunyi Feng	Women's team	Malaysia; W 3–0	Mauritius; W 3–0	Maldives; W 3–0	1 Q	Canada; W 3–0	Singapore; L 0–3	Wales; W 3–0	3rd place, bronze medalist(s)

== Triathlon ==
Four vision impaired Para-Triathletes and their guides were announced on 11 May 2022. Six triathletes were selected on 13 June 2022.

Men

Athlete	Event	Swim (750 m)	Trans 1	Bike (20 km / 25 km paratriathlon)	Trans 2	Run (5 km)	Total	Rank
Jake Birtwhistle	Men's	8:51	0:49	26:08	0:18	14:59	51:06	4
Brandon Copeland	Men's	8:54	0:53	27:40	0:17	16:36	54:20	22
Matthew Hauser	Men's	8:41	0:56	26:10	0:17	14:46	50:50	3rd place, bronze medalist(s)
Jonathan Goerlach; David Mainwaring (guide)	Men's PTVI	13:00	1:24	28:46	0:31	18:54	1:05:21	3rd place, bronze medalist(s)
Gerrard Gosens; Hayden Armstrong (guide)	Men's PTVI	13:40	1:49	30:35	0:36	22:01	1:08:41	6
Sam Harding; Luke Harvey (guide)	Men's PTVI	10:52	1:02	28:46	0:35	18:08	1:02:09	2nd place, silver medalist(s)

Women

Athlete	Event	Swim (750 m)	Trans 1	Bike (20 km / 25 km paratriathlon)	Trans 2	Run (5 km)	Total	Rank
Sophie Linn	Women's	9:37	0:57	29:20	0:24	16:50	57:08	5
Charlotte McShane	Women's	9:36	0:57	29:23	0:19	17:27	57:42	11
Natalie Van Coevorden	Women's	9:28	0:59	29:29	0:20	17:45	58:01	14
Erica Burleigh; Felicity Cradick (guide)	Women's PTVI	14:28	1:40	37:12	0:36	29:34	1:26:49	6

Mixed Relay

Athletes	Event	Total Times per Athlete (Swim 250 m, Bike 7 km, Run 1.5 km)	Total Group Time	Rank
Jacob Birtwhistle; Natalie Van Coevorden; Matthew Hauser; Sophie Linn	Mixed relay	17:52 (3); 20:47 (6); 18:07 (1); 20:43 (3)	1:17:29	3rd place, bronze medalist(s)

== Weightlifting ==
A squad of eleven weightlifters (five men, six women) was officially selected on 19 April 2022.

Sarah Cochrane qualified by winning gold at the 2021 Commonwealth Weightlifting Championships in Tashkent, Uzbekistan, whereas the rest of the squad qualified via the IWF Commonwealth Ranking List.

Men

Athlete	Event	Weight lifted		Total	Rank
Athlete	Event	Snatch	Clean & jerk	Total	Rank
Brandon Wakeling	73 kg	127	163	290	5
Kyle Bruce	81 kg	143	180	323	2nd place, silver medalist(s)
Ridge Barredo	96 kg	136	180	316	5
Jackson Roberts-Young	109 kg	145	202	347	5
Suamili Nanai	+109 kg	160	201	361	6

Women

Athlete	Event	Weight lifted		Total	Rank
Athlete	Event	Snatch	Clean & jerk	Total	Rank
Brenna Kean	59 kg	83	106	189	5
Sarah Cochrane	64 kg	100	116	216	2nd place, silver medalist(s)
Kiana Elliott	71 kg	94	110	204	4
Ebony Gorincu	76 kg	93	113	206	6
Eileen Cikamatana	87 kg	110 GR	145 GR	255 GR	1st place, gold medalist(s)
Charisma Amoe-Tarrant	+87 kg	100	139	239	3rd place, bronze medalist(s)

== Wrestling ==
Six wrestlers selected on 1 July 2022.

Athlete	Event	Round of 16	Quarterfinal	Semifinal	Repechage	Final / BM	
Athlete	Event	Opposition Result	Opposition Result	Opposition Result	Opposition Result	Opposition Result	Rank
Justin Holland	Men's freestyle −57 kg	Giordmaina (MLT); L (4–8)	did not advance				8
Mustafa Rezaeifar	Men's freestyle −65 kg	Ramm (ENG); L (0–3)	did not advance				8
Jayden Lawrence	Men's freestyle −86 kg	Cho (SGP); W (10–0)	Inam (PAK); L (3–8)	—N/a	Malone (SCO); W (10–0)	Lessing (RSA); W (12–11)	3rd place, bronze medalist(s)
Thomas Barns	Men's freestyle −97 kg	—N/a	de Lange (RSA); L (0–10)	—N/a	—N/a	Alofipo (SAM); W (12–0)	3rd place, bronze medalist(s)
Irene Symeonidis	Women's freestyle −57 kg	Maik (IND); L (0–10)	Harry (WAL); W (12–12)	—N/a	—N/a	Poruthotage (SRI); L (0–10)	5
Naomi De Bruine	Women's freestyle −76 kg	—N/a	Di Stasio (CAN); L (0–10)	—N/a	—N/a	Sihag (IND); L (0–11)	5

== Facts ==
- Second largest Australian Commonwealth Games team ever, behind the 473 athletes at the Gold Coast 2018 Games
- Jian Fang Lay (table tennis) and Rachael Grinham (squash) became the first female athletes to attend six Commonwealth Games.
- Blake Cochrane and Angie Ballard (athletics) became the first Para-sport athletes to represent Australia at four Commonwealth Games.
- Ten indigenous athletes: Taliqua Clancy (beach volleyball), Indiana Cooper (athletics), Ashleigh Gardner (cricket), Maurice Longbottom (rugby 7s), Callum Peters (boxing), Ruby Storm (swimming) Brandon Wakeling (weightlifting), Mariah Williams (hockey), Alex Wilson (3x3 basketball), Alex Winwood (boxing)
- The netball team's win in the final was Australia's 1,000th gold medal in Commonwealth Games history.

== See also ==
- Australia at the 2022 Winter Olympics
- Australia at the 2022 Winter Paralympics
