= Swimming at the 2022 Commonwealth Games – Women's 100 metre backstroke S8 =

Women's 100 metre backstroke S8 at the 2022 Commonwealth Games
- Venue: Sandwell Aquatics Centre
- Dates: 31 July 2022
- Competitors: 7 from 6 nations
- Winning time: 1:13.64

Medalists
gold medal	Alice Tai	England
silver medal	Tupou Neiufi	New Zealand
bronze medal	Lily Rice	Wales

The Women's 100 metre backstroke S8 event at the 2022 Commonwealth Games was held on 31 July at the Sandwell Aquatics Centre.

== Schedule ==
The schedule is as follows:

All times are British Summer Time (UTC+1)

Date	Time	Round
Sunday 31 July 2022	19:35	Final

== Results ==
=== Final ===
Rank	Lane	Name	Nationality	Time	Notes
1st place, gold medalist(s)	1	Alice Tai	England	1:13.64	
2nd place, silver medalist(s)	4	Tupou Neiufi	New Zealand	1:17.91	
3rd place, bronze medalist(s)	5	Lily Rice	Wales	1:23.06	
4	3	Camille Bérubé	Canada	1:26.00	
5	6	Isabella Vincent	Australia	1:27.47	
6	2	Ella Jones	Australia	1:28.94	
7	7	Siomha Brady	Northern Ireland	1:34.08	
