= Athletics at the 2022 Commonwealth Games – Women's 1500 metres (T54) =

Women's 1500 metres (T54) at the 2022 Commonwealth Games
- Venue: Alexander Stadium
- Dates: 4 August
- Competitors: 8 from 4 nations
- Winning time: 3:53.03

Medalists
gold medal	Madison de Rozario	Australia
silver medal	Angie Ballard	Australia
bronze medal	Samantha Kinghorn	Scotland

The women's 1500 metres (T54) at the 2022 Commonwealth Games, as part of the athletics programme, took place in the Alexander Stadium on 4 August 2022.

== Records ==
Prior to this competition, the existing world and Games records were as follows:

Records T53 / T54
World record	Manuela Schär (SUI)	3:12.35	Nottwil, Switzerland	9 August 2020
Games record	Diane Roy (CAN)	3:36.97	Gold Coast, Australia	10 April 2018

== Schedule ==
The schedule was as follows:

Date	Time	Round
Thursday 4 August 2022	20:25	Final

All times are British Summer Time (UTC+1)

== Results ==
=== Final ===
The medals were determined in the final.

Rank	Name	Sport class	Result	Notes
1st place, gold medalist(s)	Madison de Rozario (AUS)	T53	3:53.03	
2nd place, silver medalist(s)	Angie Ballard (AUS)	T53	3:53.30	
3rd place, bronze medalist(s)	Samantha Kinghorn (SCO)	T53	3:53.38	
4	Mel Woods (SCO)	T54	3:56.52	
5	Christie Dawes (AUS)	T54	4:00.25	
6	Marie Alphonse (MRI)	T54	4:01.09	
7	Nandini Sharma (CAN)	T54	4:10.83	
8	Jessica Frotten (CAN)	T53	4:10.89	
