= Swimming at the 2022 Commonwealth Games – Women's 800 metre freestyle =

Women's 800 metre freestyle at the 2022 Commonwealth Games
- Venue: Sandwell Aquatics Centre
- Dates: 1 August (heats); 2 August (final)
- Competitors: 10 from 6 nations
- Winning time: 8:13.59

Medalists
| gold medal | Ariarne Titmus | Australia |
| silver medal | Kiah Melverton | Australia |
| bronze medal | Lani Pallister | Australia |

The women's 800 metre freestyle event at the 2022 Commonwealth Games was held on 1 and 2 August at the Sandwell Aquatics Centre.

== Records ==
Prior to this competition, the existing world, Commonwealth and Games records were as follows:

| World record | Katie Ledecky (USA) | 8:04.79 | Rio de Janeiro, Brazil | 12 August 2016 |
| Commonwealth record | Ariarne Titmus (AUS) | 8:13.83 | Tokyo, Japan | 31 July 2021 |
| Games record | Jazmin Carlin (WAL) | 8:18.11 | Glasgow, Scotland | 28 July 2014 |

The following records were established during the competition:

| Date | Event | Name | Nationality | Time | Record |
|---|---|---|---|---|---|
| 2 August | Final | Ariarne Titmus | Australia | 8:13.59 | GR, CR |

== Schedule ==
The schedule is as follows:

All times are British Summer Time (UTC+1)

| Date | Time | Round |
|---|---|---|
| Monday 1 August 2022 | 11:48 | Qualifying |
| Tuesday 2 August 2022 | 21:15 | Final |

== Results ==
=== Heats ===
| Rank | Heat | Lane | Name | Nationality | Time | Notes |
|---|---|---|---|---|---|---|
| 1 | 1 | 4 | Lani Pallister | Australia | 8:32.67 | Q |
| 2 | 2 | 4 | Ariarne Titmus | Australia | 8:36.17 | Q |
| 3 | 1 | 5 | Eve Thomas | New Zealand | 8:39.01 | Q |
| 4 | 2 | 5 | Kiah Melverton | Australia | 8:40.29 | Q |
| 5 | 1 | 3 | Mabel Zavaros | Canada | 8:40.31 | Q |
| 6 | 2 | 3 | Katrina Bellio | Canada | 8:42.42 | Q |
| 7 | 2 | 6 | Michaela Pulford | South Africa | 8:48.84 | Q |
| 8 | 2 | 2 | Harper Barrowman | Cayman Islands | 9:16.49 | Q |
| 9 | 1 | 6 | Lily Scott | Jersey | 9:27.99 | R |
| 10 | 1 | 2 | Raya Embury-Brown | Cayman Islands | 9:30.75 | R |

=== Final ===
| Rank | Lane | Name | Nationality | Time | Notes |
|---|---|---|---|---|---|
| 1st place, gold medalist(s) | 5 | Ariarne Titmus | Australia | 8:13.59 | GR |
| 2nd place, silver medalist(s) | 6 | Kiah Melverton | Australia | 8:16.79 | |
| 3rd place, bronze medalist(s) | 4 | Lani Pallister | Australia | 8:19.16 | |
| 4 | 3 | Eve Thomas | New Zealand | 8:32.63 | |
| 5 | 7 | Katrina Bellio | Canada | 8:42.07 | |
| 6 | 1 | Michaela Pulford | South Africa | 8:44.77 | |
| 7 | 2 | Mabel Zavaros | Canada | 8:53.50 | |
| 8 | 8 | Harper Barrowman | Cayman Islands | 9:13.97 | |
