= Swimming at the 2022 Commonwealth Games – Men's 50 metre freestyle S13 =

Event held on 30 July at the Sandwell Aquatics Centre

Men's 50 metre freestyle S13 at the 2022 Commonwealth Games
- Venue: Sandwell Aquatics Centre
- Dates: 30 July
- Competitors: 5 from 5 nations
- Winning time: 24.32

Medalists
gold medal	Nicolas-Guy Turbide	Canada
silver medal	Stephen Clegg	Scotland
bronze medal	Jacob Templeton	Australia

The men's 50 metre freestyle S13 event at the 2022 Commonwealth Games was held on 30 July at the Sandwell Aquatics Centre.

This marked the first time visually impaired swimming was held at the Commonwealth Games.

Nicolas-Guy Turbide of Canada won the event with a time of 24.32.

== Results ==
=== Final ===
Rank	Lane	Name	Nationality	Time
1st place, gold medalist(s)	3	Nicolas-Guy Turbide	Canada	24.32
2nd place, silver medalist(s)	6	Stephen Clegg	Scotland	24.33
3rd place, bronze medalist(s)	5	Jacob Templeton	Australia	24.47
4	4	Braedan Jason	Australia	24.56
5	2	Oscar Stubbs	Australia	24.90
