= Judo at the 2022 Commonwealth Games – Men's 90 kg =

Judo competition

Judo – Men's 90 kg at the 2022 Commonwealth Games
- Venue: Coventry Arena
- Date: 3 August 2022
- Competitors: 6 from 6 nations

Medalists
gold medal	Jamal Petgrave	England
silver medal	Rémi Feuillet	Mauritius
bronze medal	Shah Hussain Shah	Pakistan
bronze medal	Harrison Cassar	Australia

The Men's 90 kg judo competitions at the 2022 Commonwealth Games in Birmingham, England took place on August 3 at the Coventry Arena. A total of 6 competitors from 6 nations took part.

== Results ==
The draw is as follows:

Quarter-finals
Harrison Cassar (AUS)	10
Shah Hussain Shah (PAK)	00
Jamal Petgrave (ENG)	10
Marius Metois (VAN)	00

Semi-finals
Rémi Feuillet (MRI)	10
Harrison Cassar (AUS)	00
Thomas-Laszlo Breytenbach (RSA)	00
Jamal Petgrave (ENG)	10 (yellow card)

Final
Rémi Feuillet (MRI)	00
Jamal Petgrave (ENG)	01 (yellow card)

=== Repechages ===
Repechage
Shah Hussain Shah (PAK)	w/o
Marius Metois (VAN)	w/o

Bronze medal
Shah Hussain Shah (PAK)	10
Thomas-Laszlo Breytenbach (RSA)	00
Marius Metois (VAN)	00
Harrison Cassar (AUS)	10
