= Eli Templeton =

Australian rules footballer

Personal information
- Born: 19 August 1995 (age 31)
- Original team: Burnie Dockers (TSL)
- Draft: No. 3, 2014 rookie draft
- Height: 183 cm (6 ft 0 in)
- Weight: 73 kg (161 lb)
- Position: Forward

Playing career^{1}
Years	Club	Games (Goals)
2014–2016	St Kilda	14 (6)
- ^{1} Playing statistics correct to the end of 2016.

Career highlights
- VFL premiership player: 2017

Eli Templeton is a former professional Australian rules footballer who played for the St Kilda Football Club in the Australian Football League (AFL). Templeton was recruited from the Burnie Dockers with the third pick in the 2014 AFL Rookie Draft.

Templeton made his debut in Round 1 of the 2014 AFL season against Melbourne. At the conclusion of the 2016 season, he was delisted by St Kilda.

His cousin is Australian Paralympic swimmer, Jacob Templeton.

Templeton plays for Port Melbourne in the Victorian Football League.
