= Cecilia James =

Nigerian judoka

Personal information
- Full name: Cecilia Chineye James
- Nationality: Nigeria
- Born: 5 July 2000 (age 25)

Sport
- Country: Nigeria
- Sport: Judo
- Event: 63 kg

Cecilia Chineye James (born 5 July 2000) is a Nigerian judoka who competes in the half-heavyweight category (63 kg).

She has represented Nigeria in both local and international Judo competitions.

== Achievements ==
James represented Nigeria at the 2022 Commonwealth Games in England.

She defeated Zambia's Taonga Soko in the women's 63 kg round of 16 match.

However, she was knocked out in the quarterfinals by Australia's Katharina Haecker in the women's 63 kg weight division.
