= Harrison Cassar =

Australian Olympic judoka

Personal information
- Born: 26 September 1997 (age 28)
Medal record
Representing Australia
Commonwealth Games
Bronze medal – third place	2022 Birmingham	–90kg

Harrison Cassar (born 27 September 1997) is an Australian judoka. He won a bronze medal at the 2022 Commonwealth Games in Birmingham, England. He claimed a bronze medal at the Asian Open in Hong Kong in 2018.
