= Jacob Templeton =

Australian Paralympic swimmer

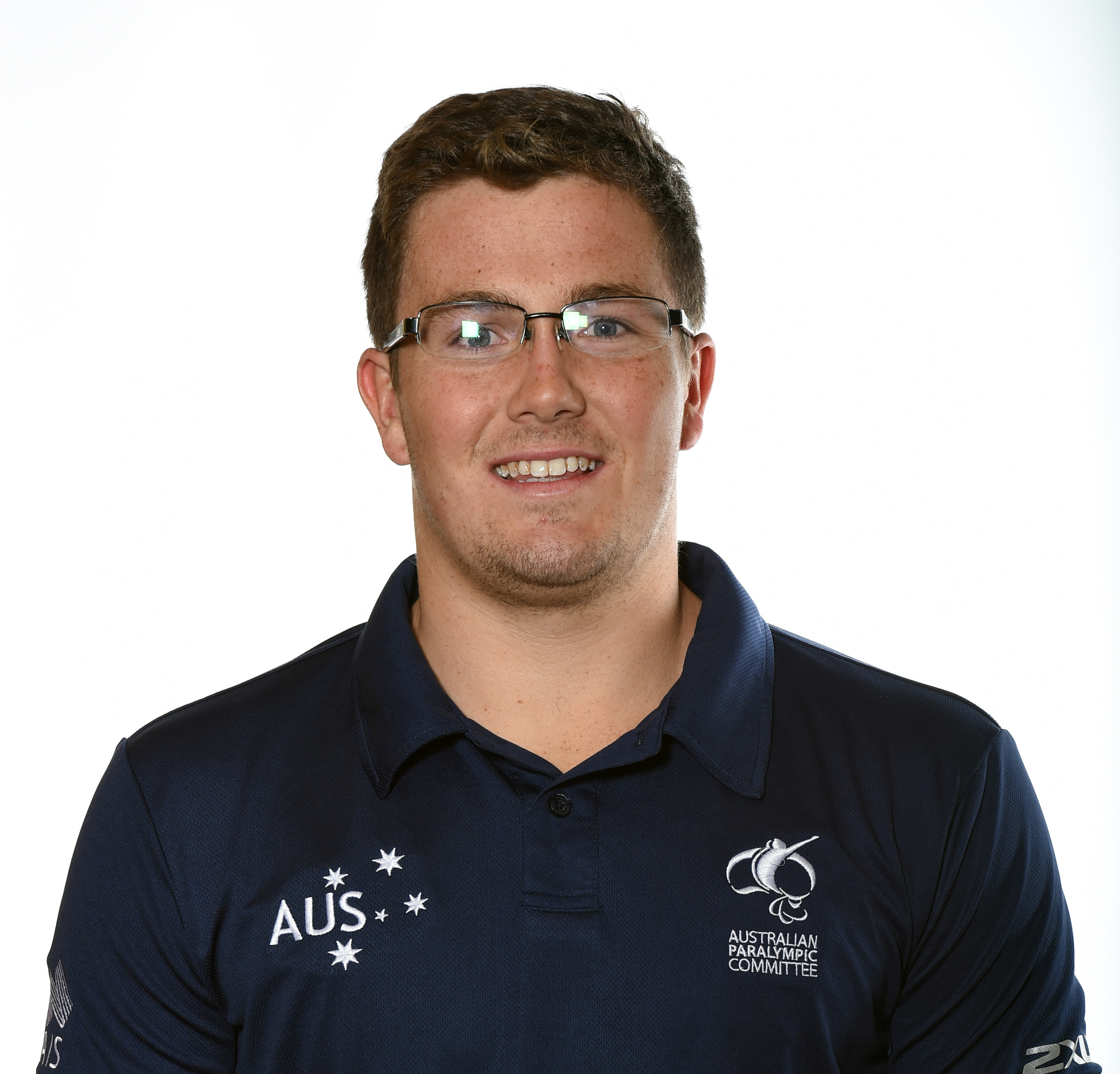
- 2016 Australian Paralympic team portrait

Personal information
- Nationality: Australia
- Born: 24 May 1995 (age 31) Devonport, Tasmania

Sport
- Sport: Swimming
- Club: USC Spartans
- Coach: Nathan Doyle
Medal record
Men's Paralympic swimming
Representing Australia
Commonwealth Games
| Bronze medal – third place | 2022 Birmingham | 100m freestyle S13 |

Jacob Templeton (born 24 May 1995) is an Australian Paralympic swimmer. He represented Australia at the 2016 Rio Paralympics.

== Personal ==
Templeton was born in Devonport, Tasmania with Retinitis Pigmentosa which is a degenerative disease of the eye. In 2016, he is studying a Bachelor of Sport and Exercise Science at the University of the Sunshine Coast. His cousin is St Kilda Football Club player Eli Templeton.

== Career ==
Templeton swims in the S13 classification as a visually impaired athlete. Templeton was born in Devonport, Tasmania and swam for Devonport throughout his youth. He now swims for the high performance para program at the University of the Sunshine Coast. Templeton describes this move as one that was to make him better as an athlete, "In Devonport I was having to travel to Burnie, Deloraine and Launceston to train for quite some time and did the majority of this alone and without a coach on deck. Now I live nearby the pool and have an amazing coach and team to train with. Our gym is at the pool complex and we have regular access to technical filming, massage, recovery equipment and much more."

At age 17, (2012) Templeton competed in his first multi-class event. In 2014, Templeton was selected for the Australian team to travel to Pasadena, California for the Para Pan Pacific Championships. Swimming well at the 2015 Australian Open Swimming Championships in Sydney saw him being selected to travel to Glasgow for the IPC world championships. Templeton said his preparation prior to the championships is one that consisted of, "nine swimming sessions with two to three gym sessions as well." Templeton swam competitively at the Championships finishing 8th for the Men’s 400m Freestyle (S13). He also finished 10th in the Men’s 50m Freestyle (S13), Men’s 200m Individual Medley (SM13) and the Men’s 100m Butterfly (S13).

At the 2016 Rio Paralympic Games, he competed in five events. He placed eighth in the Men's 200m Individual Medley SM13 and sixth in Men's 400m Freestyle S13. He also competed in Men's 50m Freestyle S13, Men's 100m Freestyle S13 and Men's 100m Butterfly S13 but didn't progress to the finals.

Templeton also attended the ‘Road to Rio’ development camp at the AIS.

At the 2022 Birmingham Commonwealth Games, he won the bronze medal in the Men's 50 m freestyle S13.
