= Ella Jones (swimmer) =

Australian Paralympic swimmer

Personal information
- Nationality: Australian
- Born: 12 October 2000 (age 24); Penrith, New South Wales

Sport
- Country: Australia
- Sport: Paralympic swimming
- Disability class: S8
- Club: Kincumber Pacific Dolphins
- Coached by: Hannah and Simon Watkins

Ella Jones (born 12 October 2000) is an Australian Paralympic swimmer. She competed at the 2024 Paris Paralympics. .

== Personal life ==
She was born in Penrith, New South Wales on 12 October 2000 with cerebral palsy. It affects her movement and posture. She is a triplet with brother Daniel and sister Georgia and also has an older brother Joshua.

== Swimming ==
Jones started swimming in a small backyard pool. She began to swim competitively when she was 15 with the Jones started swimming in a Springwood Swimming Club under Nick Robinson. She is classified as a S8 swimmer.

She was selected on the Australian team at the 2019 World Para Swimming Championships where she finished sixth in the Women's 100 m freestyle S6, seventh in the Women's 100 m backstroke S8 and fifth in the Women's 4 × 100 m freestyle 34pts.

At the 2022 Commonwealth Games, Birmingham, England, she finished sixth in the Women's 100 m backstroke para-sport S8 and Women's 100 m breaststroke para-sport SB6. At the 2023 World Para Swimming Championships, Manchester, England, she finished sixth in the Women's 100 m freestyle S8, fourth in the Women's 400 m freestyle S8 and fourth in the Mixed 4 × 100 m medley relay.

At the 2024 Paris Paralympics, she finished sixth in the Women's 400 m freestyle S8 and twelfth in the Women's 100 m backstroke S8.

In 2024, she is a New South Wales Institute of Sport scholarship athlete.
