= 3x3 basketball at the 2022 Commonwealth Games =

- Venue: Smithfield
- Dates: 29 July – 2 August 2022
- Competitors: 111 from 12 nations

3x3 basketball was among the sports contested at the 2022 Commonwealth Games, held in Birmingham, England. This variation of basketball and its wheelchair counterpart was staged at the Games for the first time. All four tournaments took place between 29 July and 2 August 2022.

It is a first time that 3x3 basketball was included in the Commonwealth Games programme with last being the 2020 Summer Olympics in Tokyo.

The discipline of wheelchair basketball made its sport debut at the Commonwealth Games.

== Schedule ==
The competition schedule was as follows:

G	Group stage	CM	Classification matches	¼	Quarter-finals	½	Semi-finals	B	Bronze medal match	F	Gold medal match

Date Event	Fri 29		Sat 30		Sun 31		Mon 1		Tue 2		
Session →	A	E	A	E	A	E	A	E	A		E
Men	G		G		G		¼	½	B		F
Women	G		G		G		¼	½	B		F
Men WC	G		G		G			½	CM	B	F
Women WC	G		G		G		½		CM	B	F

The wheelchair groups were drawn in May 2022; The running groups were drawn at a later date, August 2 Birmingham Time.

== Venue ==
The competitions were held in a temporary Games-time venue at the brownfield site in Smithfield, named after the market that once stood in its place.

The venue also played host to beach volleyball and the start of the marathon; After the Games, it will be dismantled and the site is subject to a redevelopment scheme.

== Medal summary ==
=== Medal table ===
* Host nation (England)

Rank	Nation	Gold	Silver	Bronze	Total
1	Canada	2	1	1	4
2	Australia	1	2	1	4
3	England*	1	1	2	4
Totals (3 entries)		4	4	4	12

=== Medallists ===
Event	Gold	Silver	Bronze
Men	England; Jamell Anderson; Kayne Henry; Myles Hesson; Orlan Jackman	Australia; Greg Hire; Daniel Johnson; Jesse Wagstaff; Thomas Wright	Canada; Bikramjit Gill; Alex Johnson; Jordan Jensen-Whyte; Adam Paige
Women	Canada; Taya Hanson; Rosalie Mercille; Sarah Te-Biasu; Tara Wallack	England; Shanice Beckford-Norton; Cheridene Green; Chantelle Handy; Hannah Jump	Australia; Lauren Mansfield; Lauren Scherf; Marena Whittle; Alex Wilson
Wheelchair men	Australia; Luke Pople; Lachlin Dalton; Kurt Thompson; Jake Kavanagh	Canada; Vincent Dallaire; Colin Higgins; Robert Hedges	England; Tyler Baines; Lee Manning; Charlie McIntyre; Abderrahim Taghrest
Wheelchair women	Canada; Kady Dandeneau; Tara Llanes; Tamara Steeves; Elodie Tessier	Australia; Hannah Dodd; Georgia Inglis; Amber Merritt; Ella Sabljak	England; Jade Atkin; Amy Conroy; Joy Haizelden; Charlotte Moore

== Qualification ==
=== Summary ===
CGA	Men		Women		Athletes
CGA	3x3	WC	3x3	WC	Athletes
Australia	Yes	Yes	Yes	Yes	16
British Virgin Islands			Yes		4
Canada	Yes	Yes	Yes	Yes	15
England	Yes	Yes	Yes	Yes	16
Kenya	Yes		Yes	Yes	12
Malaysia		Yes			4
New Zealand	Yes		Yes		8
Northern Ireland		Yes			4
Scotland	Yes		Yes	Yes	12
South Africa		Yes		Yes	8
Sri Lanka	Yes		Yes		8
Trinidad and Tobago	Yes				4
Total: 12 CGAs	8	6	8	6	111

=== 3x3 basketball ===
Eight nations qualify for each tournament at the 2022 Commonwealth Games:

- The host nation.
- The top nation in the FIBA 3x3 Federation Rankings from each of the six CGF regions.
- The highest-ranked nation not already qualified.

Men

Means of qualification	Date	Location	Quotas	Qualified
Host Nation	—N/a	—N/a	1	England
FIBA 3x3 Federation Rankings (Regional Qualification)	1 November 2021	—N/a	5	Kenya; Canada; Sri Lanka; Trinidad and Tobago; New Zealand
FIBA 3x3 Federation Rankings (Direct Qualification)	1 November 2021	—N/a	1	Australia
Home Nations Qualifier (Note: The Home Nations are affiliated with FIBA as a combined national federation (Great Britain). Since Great Britain was the top European men's nation, a qualifying tournament between the Home Nations (excluding England, who already qualified as hosts) was held to determine the recipient of the associated quota place.)	6 April 2022	(Scotland) Largs	1	Scotland
TOTAL			8	

Women

Means of qualification	Date	Location	Quotas	Qualified
Host Nation	—N/a	—N/a	1	England
FIBA 3x3 Federation Rankings (Regional Qualification)	1 November 2021	—N/a	5	Kenya; Canada; Sri Lanka; ~~Saint Lucia~~ (Note: Saint Lucia declined their invitation, citing inadequate preparation for the tournament. The Caribbean quota place was reallocated to the British Virgin Islands.); British Virgin Islands; New Zealand
FIBA 3x3 Federation Rankings (Direct Qualification)	1 November 2021	—N/a	1	Australia
Home Nations Qualifier (Note: The Home Nations are affiliated with FIBA as a combined national federation (Great Britain). Since Great Britain was the top European women's nation, a qualifying tournament between the Home Nations (excluding England, who already qualified as hosts) was held to determine the recipient of the associated quota place.)	6 April 2022	(Scotland) Largs	1	Scotland
TOTAL			8	

;Notes

=== 3x3 wheelchair basketball ===
Six nations qualify for each tournament at the 2022 Commonwealth Games:

- The host nation.
- The winners of the four IWBF Zonal Qualifiers.
- One nation not already qualified will receive a CGF/IWBF Bipartite Invitation.

Men

Means of qualification	Date	Location	Quotas	Qualified
Host Nation	—N/a	—N/a	1	England
IWBF Africa Qualifier	9 October 2021	(South Africa) Johannesburg	1	South Africa
IWBF Europe Qualifier	14 April 2022	(Scotland) Largs	1	Northern Ireland
Bipartite Invitation (Note: The men's IWBF Americas and Asia/Oceania Qualifiers were cancelled, so two additional invitations (one per Zone) were sent instead.)	22 April 2022	—N/a	3	Australia; Canada; Malaysia
TOTAL			6	

Women

Means of qualification	Date	Location	Quotas	Qualified
Host Nation	—N/a	—N/a	1	England
IWBF Africa Qualifier	9 October 2021	(South Africa) Johannesburg	1	South Africa
IWBF Europe Qualifier	14 April 2022	(Scotland) Largs	1	Scotland
Bipartite Invitation (Note: The women's IWBF Americas and Asia/Oceania Qualifiers were cancelled, so two additional invitations (one per Zone) were sent instead.)	22 April 2022	—N/a	3	Australia; Canada; Kenya
TOTAL			6	

;Qualifier scheduling issue
