= Canada at the 2022 Commonwealth Games =

- Flag of Canada
- CG code: CAN
- CGA: Commonwealth Sport Canada
- Website: commonwealthsport.ca

in Birmingham, England 28 July 2022 – 8 August 2022
- Competitors: 269 (127 men and 142 women) in 17 sports
- Flag bearers (opening): Josh Cassidy; Maude Charron
- Flag bearer (closing): Hollie Naughton
- Medals Ranked 3rd: Gold 26 Silver 32 Bronze 34 Total 92

Commonwealth Games appearances (overview)
- 1930; 1934; 1938; 1950; 1954; 1958; 1962; 1966; 1970; 1974; 1978; 1982; 1986; 1990; 1994; 1998; 2002; 2006; 2010; 2014; 2018; 2022; 2026; 2030

Other related appearances
- Newfoundland (1930, 1934)

Canada competed at the 2022 Commonwealth Games in Birmingham, England. This was Canada's 22nd appearance at the Commonwealth Games, having competed at every Games since their inception in 1930.

Benoît Huot was the original Chef de Mission. However, after Huot stepped down due to family commitments, 2018 Chef de Mission, Claire Carver-Dias and former sprinter and Commonwealth Games athlete Sam Effah were named as co-Chefs de Mission in April 2022.

On July 21, 2022 para-athlete Josh Cassidy and weightlifter Maude Charron were named as flagbearers for the opening ceremony. Meanwhile, the first Canadian female squash medalist at the Commonwealth Games, Hollie Naughton was the closing ceremony flagbearer.

Canada's team consisted of 268 athletes (126 men and 142 women) competing in 17 sports,, which consisted of a mix of top and next-gen athletes. Carson Miles was added to the team during the games, increasing the team size to 127 men and 269 total. Canada did not compete in cricket, netball and para-powerlifting.

Canada finished the games with 26 gold medals, placing it third on the medal table. This was 12 more gold medals then four years ago at the 2018 Commonwealth Games. Canada met its goals of placing third in the overall medal table with 92 medals (26 gold, 32 silver and 34 bronze), which was the most medals won by the country since the 2002 Commonwealth Games in Manchester, England. A total of 22 athletes won two or more medals, including 15 year old swimmer Summer McIntosh, who won six medals.

== Competitors ==
The following is the list of number of competitors participating at the Games per sport/discipline.

Sport	Men	Women	Total
3x3 basketball	7	8	15
Athletics (track and field)	14	24	38
Badminton	4	4	8
Beach volleyball	2	2	4
Boxing	4	2	6
Cycling	9	10	19
Diving	5	5	10
Field hockey	18	18	36
Gymnastics	5	8	13
Judo	5	4	9
Lawn bowls	5	5	10
Rugby sevens	13	13	26
Squash	2	2	4
Swimming	13	15	28
Table tennis	6	4	10
Triathlon	3	4	7*
Weightlifting	6	8	14
Wrestling	6	6	12
Total	127	142	269

- One guide is not included in the numbers.

== Medallists ==
Medal	Name	Sport	Event	Date
Gold	Summer McIntosh	Swimming	Women's 400 metre individual medley	July 29
Gold	Nicolas-Guy Turbide	Swimming	Men's 50 metre freestyle S13	July 30
Gold	Maggie Mac Neil	Swimming	Women's 100 metre butterfly	July 30
Gold	Maude Charron	Weightlifting	Women's 64 kg	August 1
Gold	Christa Deguchi	Judo	Women's 57 kg	August 1
Gold	Summer McIntosh	Swimming	Women's 200 metre individual medley	August 1
Gold	Maya Laylor	Weightlifting	Women's 76 kg	August 2
Gold	Catherine Beauchemin-Pinard	Judo	Women's 63 kg	August 2
Gold	Joshua Liendo	Swimming	Men's 100 metre butterfly	August 2
Gold	Kady Dandeneau; Tara Llanes; Tamara Steeves; Elodie Tessier	3x3 basketball	Women's wheelchair tournament	August 2
Gold	Taya Hanson; Rosalie Mercille; Sarah Te-Biasu; Tara Wallack	3x3 basketball	Women's tournament	August 2
Gold	Shady Elnahas	Judo	Men's 100 kg	August 3
Gold	Nicholas Bennett	Swimming	Men's 200 metre freestyle S14	August 3
Gold	Marc Deschenes	Judo	Men's +100 kg	August 3
Gold	Kylie Masse	Swimming	Women's 50 metre backstroke	August 3
Gold	Sarah Mitton	Athletics	Women's shot put	August 3
Gold	Tatiana Cocsanova; Carmel Kallemaa; Suzanna Shahbazian	Gymnastics	Women's rhythmic team all-around	August 4
Gold	Mia Vallée	Diving	Women's 1 metre springboard	August 5
Gold	Amar Dhesi	Wrestling	Men's freestyle 125 kg	August 5
Gold	Justina Di Stasio	Wrestling	Women's freestyle 76 kg	August 6
Gold	Camryn Rogers	Athletics	Women's hammer throw	August 6
Gold	Nishan Randhawa	Wrestling	Men's freestyle 97 kg	August 6
Gold	Evan Dunfee	Athletics	Men's 10,000 m walk	August 7
Gold	Tammara Thibeault	Boxing	Women's 75 kg	August 7
Gold	Kyra Constantine; Natassha McDonald; Micha Powell; Aiyanna Stiverne	Athletics	Women's 4 × 400 m relay	August 7
Gold	Melissa Humana-Paredes; Sarah Pavan	Beach volleyball	Women's tournament	August 7
Silver	Lauriane Genest; Kelsey Mitchell; Sarah Orban	Cycling	Women's team sprint	July 29
Silver	Chris Kaji; Félix Dolci; Jayson Rampersad; Mathys Jalbert; Kenji Tamane	Gymnastics	Men's artistic team all-around	July 29
Silver	Kelsey Mitchell	Cycling	Women's sprint	July 30
Silver	Kelsey Mitchell	Cycling	Women's 500 m time trial	July 31
Silver	Kylie Masse	Swimming	Women's 100 metre backstroke	July 31
Silver	Ella Jansen; Summer McIntosh; Katerine Savard; Mary-Sophie Harvey	Swimming	Women's 4 × 200 m freestyle relay	July 31
Silver	Felix Dolci	Gymnastics	Men's floor	August 1
Silver	Laurie Denommée	Gymnastics	Women's vault	August 1
Silver	Kelly Deguchi	Judo	Women's 52 kg	August 1
Silver	Kylie Masse	Swimming	Women's 200 metre backstroke	August 1
Silver	Alexis Ashworth	Weightlifting	Women's 71 kg	August 1
Silver	François Gauthier-Drapeau	Judo	Men's 81 kg	August 2
Silver	Vincent Dallaire; Colin Higgins; Robert Hedges	3x3 basketball	Men's wheelchair tournament	August 2
Silver	Kristel Ngarlem	Weightlifting	Women's 87 kg	August 2
Silver	Aurelie Rivard	Swimming	Women's 200 metre individual medley SM10	August 2
Silver	James Dergousoff; Ruslan Gaziev; Maggie Mac Neil; Kylie Masse; Javier Acevedo; Sophie Angus; Patrick Hussey; Rebecca Smith	Swimming	Mixed 4 × 100 m medley relay	August 2
Silver	Kyle Reyes	Judo	Men's 100 kg	August 3
Silver	Hollie Naughton	Squash	Women's singles	August 3
Silver	Summer McIntosh	Swimming	Women's 400 metre freestyle	August 3
Silver	Sophie Angus; Kylie Masse; Maggie Mac Neil; Summer McIntosh	Swimming	Women's 4 × 100 m medley relay	August 3
Silver	Lachlan McNeil	Wrestling	Men's freestyle 65 kg	August 5
Silver	Linda Morais	Wrestling	Women's freestyle 68 kg	August 5
Silver	Ana Godinez	Wrestling	Women's freestyle 62 kg	August 5
Silver	Rylan Wiens; Nathan Zsombor-Murray	Diving	Men's 10 metre synchronised platform	August 5
Silver	Suzanna Shahbazian	Gymnastics	Women's rhythmic individual clubs	August 6
Silver	Carmel Kallemaa	Gymnastics	Women's rhythmic individual ribbon	August 6
Silver	Ethan Katzberg	Athletics	Men's hammer throw	August 6
Silver	Madison Parks	Wrestling	Women's freestyle 50 kg	August 6
Silver	Samantha Stewart	Wrestling	Women's freestyle 53 kg	August 6
Silver	Daniel Dearing; Samuel Schachter	Beach volleyball	Men's tournament	August 7
Silver	Rylan Wiens	Diving	Men's 10 metre platform	August 7
Silver	Michelle Li	Badminton	Women's singles	August 8
Bronze	Javier Acevedo; Joshua Liendo; Rebecca Smith; Maggie Mac Neil; Ruslan Gaziev; Stephen Calkins; Ella Jansen; Mary-Sophie Harvey	Swimming	Mixed 4 × 100 m freestyle relay	July 29
Bronze	Hannah Kaminski	Weightlifting	Women's 49 kg	July 30
Bronze	Maggie Mac Neil; Summer McIntosh; Katerine Savard; Rebecca Smith	Swimming	Women's 4 × 100 m freestyle relay	July 30
Bronze	Laurie Denommée; Jenna Lalonde; Cassie Lee; Emma Spence; Maya Zonneveld	Gymnastics	Women's artistic team all-around	July 30
Bronze	Javier Acevedo; Jeremy Bagshaw; Eric Brown; Ruslan Gaziev; Joshua Liendo; Finlay Knox; Stephen Calkins	Swimming	Men's 4 × 100 m freestyle relay	July 30
Bronze	Jessica Tuomela; Emma Skaug (Guide)	Triathlon	Women's PTVI	July 31
Bronze	Tali Darsigny	Weightlifting	Women's 59 kg	July 31
Bronze	Emma Spence	Gymnastics	Women's artistic individual all-around	July 31
Bronze	Shad Darsigny	Weightlifting	Men's 73 kg	July 31
Bronze	Nicolas Vachon	Weightlifting	Men's 81 kg	August 1
Bronze	Jayson Rampersad	Gymnastics	Men's Pommel horse	August 1
Bronze	Chris Kaji	Gymnastics	Men's rings	August 1
Bronze	Maggie Coles-Lyster	Cycling	Women's scratch race	August 1
Bronze	Kelsey Mitchell	Cycling	Women's keirin	August 1
Bronze	Camille Berube	Swimming	Women's 100 m breaststroke SB6	August 1
Bronze	Javier Acevedo	Swimming	Men's 50 metre backstroke	August 1
Bronze	Emma Spence	Gymnastics	Women's balance beam	August 2
Bronze	Alex Johnson; Bikramjit Gill; Jordan Jensen-Whyte; Adam Paige	3x3 basketball	Men's tournament	August 2
Bronze	Mohab Elnahas	Judo	Men's 81 kg	August 2
Bronze	Joshua Liendo	Swimming	Men's 50 metre freestyle	August 3
Bronze	Zachary Gingras	Athletics	Men's 100 m (T38)	August 3
Bronze	Caeli McKay	Diving	Women's 10 metre platform	August 4
Bronze	Hannah Taylor	Wrestling	Women's freestyle 57 kg	August 5
Bronze	Alex Moore	Wrestling	Men's freestyle 86 kg	August 5
Bronze	Carmel Kallemaa	Gymnastics	Women's rhythmic individual ball	August 6
Bronze	Priyanka Dhillon	Boxing	Women's 48 kg	August 6
Bronze	Margo Erlam; Mia Vallée	Diving	Women's synchronised 3 metre springboard	August 6
Bronze	Carmel Kallemaa	Gymnastics	Women's rhythmic individual ribbon	August 6
Bronze	Wyatt Sanford	Boxing	Men's 63.5 kg	August 6
Bronze	Darthe Capellan	Wrestling	Men's freestyle 57 kg	August 6
Bronze	Jasmit Phulka	Wrestling	Men's freestyle 74 kg	August 6
Bronze	Keoma-Ali Al-Ahmadieh	Boxing	Men's 57 kg	August 6
Bronze	Jillian Weir	Athletics	Women's hammer throw	August 6
Bronze	Mia Vallée	Diving	Women's 3 metre springboard	August 7

Medals by sport
Sport	1st place, gold medalist(s)	2nd place, silver medalist(s)	3rd place, bronze medalist(s)	Total
Swimming	7	7	6	20
Judo	4	3	1	8
Athletics	4	1	2	7
Wrestling	3	5	4	12
Weightlifting	2	2	4	8
3x3 basketball	2	1	1	4
Gymnastics	1	5	7	13
Diving	1	2	3	6
Beach volleyball	1	1	0	2
Boxing	1	0	3	4
Cycling	0	3	2	5
Squash	0	1	0	1
Badminton	0	1	0	1
Triathlon	0	0	1	1
Total	26	32	34	92

Medals by day
Day	1st place, gold medalist(s)	2nd place, silver medalist(s)	3rd place, bronze medalist(s)	Total
July 29	1	2	1	4
July 30	2	1	4	7
July 31	0	3	4	7
August 1	3	5	7	15
August 2	5	5	3	13
August 3	5	4	2	11
August 4	1	0	1	2
August 5	2	4	2	8
August 6	3	5	9	17
August 7	4	2	1	7
August 8	0	1	0	1
Total	26	32	34	92

== 3x3 basketball ==
Canada has qualified to compete in both the men's and women's tournaments. On May 23, 2022, it was confirmed that Canada had earned a bipartie spot for each of the wheelchair tournaments. This meant team size overall for basketball was 16 (eight per gender), the maximum permitted. The 3x3 teams were officially named on July 18, 2022. The wheelchair teams were officially named on July 22, 2022.

Summary

Team	Event	Preliminary round				Quarterfinal	Semifinal	Final / BM / PM	
Team	Event	Opposition Result	Opposition Result	Opposition Result	Rank	Opposition Result	Opposition Result	Opposition Result	Rank
Canada men	Men's tournament	Kenya; W 15–12	Scotland; L 20–21	Sri Lanka; W 21–8	2 Q	New Zealand; W 21–18	England; L 12–13	Scotland; W 13–12	3rd place, bronze medalist(s)
Canada women	Women's tournament	British Virgin Islands; W 22–6	New Zealand; L 11–21	England; L 17–21	3 Q	Scotland; W 17–11	New Zealand; W 16–11	England; W 14–13	1st place, gold medalist(s)
Canada wheelchair men	Men's tournament	Australia; L 11–13	Northern Ireland; W 13–5	—N/a	1 Q	—N/a	Malaysia; W 14–9	Australia; L 9–11	2nd place, silver medalist(s)
Canada wheelchair women	Women's tournament	Kenya; W 17–1	England; W 13–8	—N/a	1 Q	—N/a	Scotland; W 12–5	Australia; W 14–5	1st place, gold medalist(s)

=== Men's tournament ===
Roster

- Bikramjit Gill
- Alex Johnson
- Jordan Jensen-Whyte
- Adam Paige

Group A

Pos	Team	Pld	W	L	PF	PA	PD	Qualification
1	Scotland	3	3	0	52	43	+9	Direct to semi-finals
2	Canada	3	2	1	56	41	+15	Quarter-finals
3	Kenya	3	1	2	47	48	−1	Quarter-finals
4	Sri Lanka	3	0	3	35	58	−23	

Source: Birmingham 2022
Rules for classification: 1) Wins; 2) Head-to-head record; 3) Points scored.

29 July 2022
15:30

Report

Canada	15–12	Kenya
Pts: Gill 5		Pts: Omondi 6

Smithfield

29 July 2022
19:30

Report

Scotland	21–20	Canada
Pts: Malcolm 9		Pts: Gill, Jensen-Whyte, Johnson 6

Smithfield

31 July 2022
15:30

Report

Canada	21–8	Sri Lanka
Pts: Gill 8		Pts: Yogananthan 6

Smithfield

Quarterfinals

1 August 2022
15:00

Report

Canada	21–18	New Zealand
Pts: Gill 8		Pts: Bezzant 14

Smithfield

Semifinals

1 August 2022
22:00

Report

England	13–12	Canada
Pts: Hesson 6		Pts: Johnson 9

Smithfield

Bronze medal match

2 August 2022
15:00

Report

Scotland	12–13	Canada
Pts: Jimenez 7		Pts: Gill 5

Smithfield

=== Women's tournament ===
Roster

- Taya Hanson
- Rosalie Mercille
- Sarah Te-Biasu
- Tara Wallack

Group A

Pos	Team	Pld	W	L	PF	PA	PD	Qualification
1	New Zealand	3	3	0	55	30	+25	Direct to semi-finals
2	England (H)	3	2	1	57	37	+20	Quarter-finals
3	Canada	3	1	2	50	48	+2	Quarter-finals
4	British Virgin Islands	3	0	3	16	63	−47	

Source: Birmingham 2022
Rules for classification: 1) Wins; 2) Head-to-head record; 3) Points scored.
(H) Hosts

30 July 2022
15:30

Report

British Virgin Islands	6–22	Canada
Pts: Pickering, Fahie 2		Pts: Mercille, Wallack 7

Smithfield

30 July 2022
19:30

Report

Canada	11–21	New Zealand
Pts: Te-Biasu 6		Pts: Clarke 9

Smithfield

31 July 2022
19:30

Report

England	21–17	Canada
Pts: Jump 9		Pts: Te-Biasu 12

Smithfield

Quarterfinals

1 August 2022
15:30

Report

Scotland	11–17	Canada
Pts: Paxton, Phillips, Leonard 3		Pts: Wallack 6

Smithfield

Semifinals

1 August 2022
19:30

Report

New Zealand	11–16	Canada
Pts: Harmon, Fotu 4		Pts: Wallack 8

Smithfield

Gold medal match

2 August 2022
19:30

Report

England	13–14	Canada
Pts: Beckford-Norton 6		Pts: Te-Biasu 7

Smithfield

=== Men's wheelchair ===
Garrett Ostepchuk was named to the team but did not compete.

Roster

- Vincent Dallaire
- Colin Higgins
- Robert Hedges

Group B

Pos	Team	Pld	W	L	PF	PA	PD	Qualification
1	Canada	2	1	1	24	18	+6	Semi-finals
2	Australia	2	1	1	24	24	0	Semi-finals
3	Northern Ireland	2	1	1	16	22	−6	5th place match

Source: Birmingham 2022
Rules for classification: 1) Wins; 2) Head-to-head record; 3) Points scored.

29 July 2022
19:30

Report

Canada	11–13	Australia
Pts: Higgins 7		Pts: Dalton 8

Smithfield

30 July 2022
19:30

Report

Northern Ireland	5–13	Canada
Pts: McCabe 3		Pts: Higgins 6

Smithfield

Semifinals

1 August 2022
19:30

Report

Canada	14–9	Malaysia
Pts: Hedges 5		Pts: Johari, Tan Yei Bing 3

Smithfield

Gold medal match

2 August 2022
19:30

Report

Australia	11–9	Canada
Pts: Pople 6		Pts: Higgins 5

Smithfield

=== Women's wheelchair ===
Roster

- Kady Dandeneau
- Tara Llanes
- Tamara Steeves
- Elodie Tessier

Group A

Pos	Team	Pld	W	L	PF	PA	PD	Qualification
1	Canada	2	2	0	30	9	+21	Semi-finals
2	England (H)	2	1	1	28	14	+14	Semi-finals
3	Kenya	2	0	2	2	37	−35	5th place match

Source: Birmingham 2022
Rules for classification: 1) Wins; 2) Head-to-head record; 3) Points scored.
(H) Hosts

30 July 2022
15:30

Report

Canada	17–1	Kenya
Pts: Dandeneau 7		Pts: Alar 1

Smithfield

31 July 2022
15:30

Report

England	8–13	Canada
Pts: Haizelden 5		Pts: Steeves 7

Smithfield

Semifinals

1 August 2022
15:00

Report

Canada	12–5	Scotland
Pts: Tessier, Dandeneau 5		Pts: Love 3

Smithfield

Gold medal match

2 August 2022
19:30

Report

Canada	14–5	Australia
Pts: Dandeneau 6		Pts: Dodd 3

Smithfield

== Athletics (track and field) ==
On May 13, 2022, Athletics Canada named an initial para-athletics team of six athletes. The later additions of Alex Dupont, Nandini Sharma, Thomas Normandeau and Natalie Thirsk raised the team size to ten athletes (six men and four women). Canada's able-bodied team was given a quota of 33 athletes by Commonwealth Sport Canada. The 33 member able-bodied team (13 men and 20 women) was officially named on June 21, 2022. On July 26, 2022, Andre De Grasse, Jerome Blake, Aaron Brown and Pierce LePage withdrew from the team citing difficulties encountered at the 2022 World Athletics Championships, which concluded the week before the games.

Men
Track and road events

Athlete	Event	Heat		Semifinal		Final	
Athlete	Event	Result	Rank	Result	Rank	Result	Rank
Malachi Murray	100 m	10.47	4	did not advance			
David Johnson	100 m (T12)	11.80	7	—N/a		did not advance	
Zachary Gingras	100 m (T38)	—N/a				11.65	3rd place, bronze medalist(s)
Thomas Normandeau	100 m (T47)	11.87	5	—N/a		Did not advance	
Brendon Rodney	200 m	20.84	8 Q	20.68	5 Q	20.65	5
William Paulson	1500 m	3:38.36	6 q	—N/a		3:33.97 PB	10
Josh Cassidy	1500 m (T54)	—N/a				3:25.20	5
Alex Dupont	1500 m (T54)	—N/a				3:29.80	6
John Gay	5000 m	—N/a				13:29.82 PB	9
Malik Metivier	400 m hurdles	51.54	3 Q	—N/a		DSQ	
John Gay	3000 m steeplechase	—N/a				8:30.26	4
Josh Cassidy	Marathon (T54)	—N/a				1:47:47	4
Evan Dunfee	10,000 metres walk	—N/a				38:36.37 GR, PB	1st place, gold medalist(s)

Field events

Athlete	Event	Final	
Athlete	Event	Distance	Rank
Rowan Hamilton	Hammer throw	67.76	9
Ethan Katzberg	Hammer throw	76.36 PB	2nd place, silver medalist(s)
Adam Keenan	Hammer throw	72.36	5

Women
Track and road events

Athlete	Event	Heat		Semifinal		Final	
Athlete	Event	Result	Rank	Result	Rank	Result	Rank
Natalie Thirsk	100 m (T38)	14.03	5	—N/a		Did not advance	
Natassha McDonald	200 m	23.45	9 Q	23.21 SB	6 Q	23.21 =SB	7
Zoe Sherar	200 m	did not start					
Kyra Constantine	400 m	52.03	4 Q	51.78 =SB	4	51.75 SB	7
Micha Powell	400 m	53.13	13 q	53.37	12	did not advance	
Aiyanna Stiverne	400 m	53.45	16 Q	53.52	13	did not advance	
Lindsey Butterworth	800 m	2:00.04	4 q	—N/a		2:00.79	7
Madeleine Kelly	800 m	2:02.99	5	—N/a		Did not advance	
Lucia Stafford	1500 m	4:16.15	11 Q	—N/a		4:13.83	11
Jessica Frotten	1500 m (T54)	—N/a				4:10.89	8
Nandini Sharma	1500 m (T54)	—N/a				4:10.83	7
Julie-Anne Staehli	5000 m	—N/a				15:39.23 SB	15
Michelle Harrison	100 m hurdles	12.85	7 q	—N/a		25.13	8
Noelle Montcalm	400 m hurdles	58.68	10	—N/a		did not advance	
Kyra Constantine; Natassha McDonald; Micha Powell; Aiyanna Stiverne	4 × 400 m relay	—N/a				3:25.84	1st place, gold medalist(s)

Field events

Athlete	Event	Qualification		Final	
Athlete	Event	Distance	Rank	Distance	Rank
Anicka Newell	Pole vault	—N/a		4.35	5
Alysha Newman	Pole vault	—N/a		4.25	6
Christabel Nettey	Long jump	6.45	9 q	6.41	9
Brittany Crew	Shot put	did not start			
Sarah Mitton	Shot put	18.24	2 Q	19.03	1st place, gold medalist(s)
Sarah Mickey	Shot put (F57)	—N/a		7.71 GR, PB	5
Kaila Butler	Hammer throw	63.34	6 q	64.22	8
Camryn Rogers	Hammer throw	74.68 GR	1 Q	74.08	1st place, gold medalist(s)
Jillian Weir	Hammer throw	60.96	10 q	67.35	3rd place, bronze medalist(s)
Elizabeth Gleadle	Javelin throw	—N/a		59.79	4

== Badminton ==
As of June 1, 2022, Canada qualified for the mixed team event via the BWF World Rankings. The team of eight athletes (four per gender) was named June 29, 2022.

Athlete	Event	Round of 64	Round of 32	Round of 16	Quarterfinal	Semifinal	Final / BM	
Athlete	Event	Opposition Score	Opposition Score	Opposition Score	Opposition Score	Opposition Score	Opposition Score	Rank
Brian Yang	Men's singles	Bye	Ricketts (JAM); L WO	did not advance				
Michelle Li	Women's singles	Bye	Holden (ENG); W WO	Khan (SGP); W 2–0 (21–10, 21–9)	Darragh (NIR); W 2–0 (21–14, 21–14)	Gilmour (SCO); W 2–1 (21–23, 23–21, 21–18)	Sindhu (IND); L 0–2 (15–21, 13–21)	2nd place, silver medalist(s)
Adam Dong; Nyl Yakura	Men's doubles	—N/a	Hee / Hean (SGP); W WO	Lane / Vendy (ENG); L 0–2 (13–21, 19–21)	did not advance			
Kristen Tsai; Rachel Honderich	Women's doubles	—N/a	Bye	MacPherson / Torrance (SCO); W 2–0 (21–12, 21–15)	Chen / Somerville (AUS); L 1–2 (21–18, 11–21, 16–21)	did not advance		
Ty Alexander Lindeman; Josephine Wu	Mixed doubles	Bye	Dias / Hendahewa (SRI); L 0–2 (11–21, 18–21)	did not advance				

Mixed team

Summary

Team	Event	Group stage				Quarterfinal	Semifinal	Final / BM	
Team	Event	Opposition Score	Opposition Score	Opposition Score	Rank	Opposition Score	Opposition Score	Opposition Score	Rank
Canada	Mixed team	Uganda; W 5–0	Maldives; W 5–0	Scotland; W 3–2	1 Q	England; L 0–3	did not advance		

Squad

All eight athletes listed above competed in the team event.

Group 3

Pos	Team	Pld	W	L	MF	MA	MD	GF	GA	GD	PF	PA	PD	Pts	Qualification
1	Canada	3	3	0	13	2	+11	26	4	+22	610	319	+291	3	Knockout stage
2	Scotland	3	2	1	11	4	+7	22	8	+14	562	365	+197	2	Knockout stage
3	Uganda	3	1	2	5	10	−5	11	21	−10	416	597	−181	1	
4	Maldives	3	0	3	1	14	−13	3	29	−26	344	651	−307	0	

Source: BWF

Canada
5
National Exhibition Centre, Court 3
29 July 2022, 14:00 UTC+1

Uganda
0

			1	2	3
1	(Canada) (Uganda)	Ty Alexander Lindeman / Josephine Wu; Daniel Wanagaliya / Fadilah Mohamed Rafi	21; 13	21; 5
2	(Canada) (Uganda)	Brian Yang; Brian Kasirye	21; 12	21; 14
3	(Canada) (Uganda)	Michelle Li; Husina Kobugabe	21; 8	21; 8
4	(Canada) (Uganda)	Adam Dong / Nyl Yakura; Brian Kasirye / Daniel Wanagaliya	21; 2	21; 9
5	(Canada) (Uganda)	Rachel Honderich / Kristen Tsai; Husina Kobugabe / Fadilah Mohamed Rafi	21; 6	21; 10

Canada
5
National Exhibition Centre, Court 2
30 July 2022, 09:00 UTC+1

Maldives
0

			1	2	3
1	(Canada) (Maldives)	Ty Alexander Lindeman / Josephine Wu; Ajfan Rasheed / Aminath Nabeeha Abdul Razzaq	21; 8	21; 16
2	(Canada) (Maldives)	Brian Yang; Ahmed Nibal	21; 6	21; 8
3	(Canada) (Maldives)	Michelle Li; Fathimath Nabaaha Abdul Razzaq	21; 4	21; 5
4	(Canada) (Maldives)	Adam Dong / Nyl Yakura; Ajfan Rasheed / Zayan Zaki	21; 9	21; 12
5	(Canada) (Maldives)	Kristen Tsai / Rachel Honderich; Fathimath Nabaaha Abdul Razzaq / Aminath Nabeeha Abdul Razzaq	21; 7	21; 3

Canada
3
National Exhibition Centre, Court 1
30 July 2022, 19:00 UTC+1

Scotland
2

			1	2	3
1	(Canada) (Scotland)	Ty Alexander Lindeman / Josephine Wu; Adam Hall / Julie MacPherson	12; 21	18; 21
2	(Canada) (Scotland)	Michelle Li; Kirsty Gilmour	21; 10	21; 15
3	(Canada) (Scotland)	Brian Yang; Callum Smith	21; 11	21; 9
4	(Canada) (Scotland)	Rachel Honderich / Kristen Tsai; Julie MacPherson / Ciara Torrance	21; 12	21; 13
5	(Canada) (Scotland)	Adam Dong / Nyl Yakura; Alexander Dunn / Adam Hall	16; 21	18; 21

Quarterfinals

Canada
0
National Exhibition Centre, Court 1
31 July 2022, 11:00 UTC+1

England
3

			1	2	3
1	(Canada) (England)	Ty Alexander Lindeman / Josephine Wu; Marcus Ellis / Lauren Smith	12; 21	9; 21
2	(Canada) (England)	Brian Yang; Toby Penty	19; 21	19; 21
3	(Canada) (England)	Adam Dong / Nyl Yakura; Ben Lane / Sean Vendy	17; 21	12; 21
4	(Canada) (England)	Michelle Li; Freya Patel-Redfearn				not played
5	(Canada) (England)	Rachel Honderich / Kristen Tsai; Chloe Birch / Lauren Smith				not played

== Beach volleyball ==
Canada qualified a men's and women's pair, after having the top ranked pair in the FIVB Beach Volleyball World Rankings as of March 31, 2022. The team was officially named on June 24, 2022.

Athletes	Event	Preliminary Round				Quarterfinals	Semifinals	Final / BM	Rank
Athletes	Event	Opposition Score	Opposition Score	Opposition Score	Rank	Opposition Score	Opposition Score	Opposition Score	Rank
Daniel Dearing; Samuel Schachter	Men's	Yapa / Rashmika (SRI); W 2–0 (21–13, 21–12)	Hodge / Seabrookes (SKN); W 2–0 (21–12, 21–7)	Jawo / Jarra (GAM); W 2–1 (17–21, 21–19, 15–12)	1 Q	Liotatis / Zorbis (CYP); W 2–0 (21–9, 21–11)	Bello / Bello (ENG); W 2–1 (15–21, 21–13, 15–7)	Burnett / McHugh (AUS); L 1–2 (21–17, 17–21, 18–20)	2nd place, silver medalist(s)
Melissa Humana-Paredes; Sarah Pavan	Women's	Aryee / Katadat (GHA); W 2–0 (21–7, 21–6)	Khadambi / Makokha (KEN); W 2–0 (21–15, 21–5)	Zeimann / Polley (NZL); W 2–0 (32–30, 21–10)	1 Q	Bandara / Weerasinghe (SRI); W 2–0 (21–9, 21–11)	Zeimann / Polley (NZL); W 2–1 (29–31, 21–14, 19–17)	Artacho / Clancy (AUS); W 2–1 (22–24, 21–17, 15–12)	1st place, gold medalist(s)

=== Men's tournament ===
Group A

Pos	Team	Pld	W	L	Pts	SW	SL	SR	SPW	SPL	SPR	Qualification
1	Dearing – Schachter (CAN)	3	3	0	6	6	1	6.000	137	96	1.427	Quarterfinals
2	Jawo – Jarra (GAM)	3	2	1	5	5	3	1.667	149	118	1.263	Quarterfinals
3	Yapa – Rashmika (SRI)	3	1	2	4	3	4	0.750	111	119	0.933	Ranking of third-placed teams
4	Hodge – Seabrookes (SKN)	3	0	3	3	0	6	0.000	62	126	0.492	

Source: birmingham2022.com

31 July 2022; 14:30	Dearing – Schachter (CAN)	2–0	Yapa – Rashmika (SRI)	Smithfield
31 July 2022; 14:30	(21–13, 21–12); Report			Smithfield

2 August 2022; 16:30	Dearing – Schachter (CAN)	2–0	Hodge – Seabrookes (SKN)	Smithfield
2 August 2022; 16:30	(21–12, 21–7); Report			Smithfield

4 August 2022; 14:30	Dearing – Schachter (CAN)	2–1	Jawo – Jarra (GAM)	Smithfield
4 August 2022; 14:30	(17–21, 21–19, 15–12); Report			Smithfield

Quarterfinals

5 August 2022; 19:00	Dearing – Schachter (CAN)	2–0	Liotatis – Zorbis (CYP)	Smithfield
5 August 2022; 19:00	(21–9, 21–11); Report			Smithfield

Semifinals

6 August 2022; 16:00	Dearing – Schachter (CAN)	2–1	Bello – Bello (ENG)	Smithfield
6 August 2022; 16:00	(15–21, 21–13, 15–7); Report			Smithfield

Gold medal match

7 August 2022; 16:00	Dearing – Schachter (CAN)	1–2	Burnett – McHugh (AUS)	Smithfield
7 August 2022; 16:00	(21–17, 17–21, 18–20); Report			Smithfield

=== Women's tournament ===
Group A

Pos	Team	Pld	W	L	Pts	SW	SL	SR	SPW	SPL	SPR	Qualification
1	Humana-Paredes – Pavan (CAN)	3	3	0	6	6	0	MAX	137	73	1.877	Quarterfinals
2	Zeimann – Polley (NZL)	3	2	1	5	4	2	2.000	124	105	1.181	Quarterfinals
3	Khadambi – Makokha (KEN)	3	1	2	4	2	5	0.400	101	134	0.754	Ranking of third-placed teams
4	Aryee – Katadat (GHA)	3	0	3	3	1	6	0.167	86	138	0.623	

Source: birmingham2022.com

Qualified for the Quarterfinals

30 July 2022; 14:30	Humana-Paredes – Pavan (CAN)	2–0	Aryee – Katadat (GHA)	Smithfield
30 July 2022; 14:30	(21–7, 21–6); Report			Smithfield

1 August 2022; 14:30	Humana-Paredes – Pavan (CAN)	2–0	Khadambi – Makokha (KEN)	Smithfield
1 August 2022; 14:30	(21–15, 21–5); Report			Smithfield

3 August 2022; 19:00	Humana-Paredes – Pavan (CAN)	2–0	Zeimann – Polley (NZL)	Smithfield
3 August 2022; 19:00	(32–30, 21–10); Report			Smithfield

Quarterfinals

5 August 2022; 21:00	Humana-Paredes – Pavan (CAN)	2–0	Bandara – Weerasinghe (SRI)	Smithfield
5 August 2022; 21:00	(21–9, 21–11); Report			Smithfield

Semifinals

6 August 2022; 20:00	Humana-Paredes – Pavan (CAN)	2–1	Zeimann – Polley (NZL)	Smithfield
6 August 2022; 20:00	(29–31, 21–14, 19–17); Report			Smithfield

Gold medal match

7 August 2022; 21:00	Humana-Paredes – Pavan (CAN)	2–1	Artacho – Clancy (AUS)	Smithfield
7 August 2022; 21:00	(22–24, 21–17, 15–12); Report			Smithfield

== Boxing ==
Canada's six member boxing team (four men and two women) was named on May 26, 2022.

Athlete	Event	Round of 32	Round of 16	Quarterfinals	Semifinals	Final	Rank
Athlete	Event	Opposition Result	Opposition Result	Opposition Result	Opposition Result	Opposition Result	Rank
Keoma-Ali Al-Ahmadieh	Men's 57 kg	Bye	Senior (AUS); W 3–2	Allicock (GUY); W 4–1	Gallagher (NIR); L WO	Did not advance	3rd place, bronze medalist(s)
Wyatt Sanford	Men's 63.5 kg	Pao (NIU); W RSC	Mohlerepe (LES); W 5–0	Tukamuhebwa (UGA); W 4–1	Lynch (SCO); L 0–5	Did not advance	3rd place, bronze medalist(s)
Keven Beausejour	Men's 80 kg	Bye	Cox (BAR); W 5–0	Lazzerini (SCO); L 0–5	did not advance		
Jerome Feujio	Men's +92 kg	—N/a	Bye	Onyekwere (NGR); L 0–5	did not advance		
Priyanka Dhillon	Women's 48 kg	—N/a		Ongare (KEN); W 4–1	Ghanghas (IND); L RSC	Did not advance	3rd place, bronze medalist(s)
Tammara Thibeault	Women's 75 kg	—N/a	Bye	Angel (CAY); W RSC	Parker (AUS); W 5–0	Gramane (MOZ); W 5–0	1st place, gold medalist(s)

== Cycling ==
Canada's cycling team was given a quota of 16 athletes by Commonwealth Sport Canada (eight per gender). Later, Canada received an additional two women's quotas to enter in the women's team pursuit in track cycling. Due to scheduling conflicts and a limited athlete quota, Canada will not compete in the mountain biking discipline. The team of 18 athletes (eight men and ten women) was announced on June 28, 2022. Carson Miles was a last minute addition to the team, to replace Derek Gee, who was injured during the track cycling competition.

=== Road ===
Men

Athlete	Event	Time	Rank
Pier-André Côté	Road race	3:31:50	13
Michael Foley	Road race	3:37:16	55
Mathias Guillemette	Road race	3:37:20	57
Carson Miles	Road race	3:37:20	61
Riley Pickrell	Road race	3:37:08	29
Pier-André Côté	Time trial	50:29.62	13
Michael Foley	Time trial	53:05.24	24

Women

Athlete	Event	Time	Rank
Simone Boilard	Road race	2:44:46	7
Ariane Bonhomme	Road race	2:50:30	43
Maggie Coles-Lyster	Road race	2:44:46	5
Alison Jackson	Road race	2:44:46	14
Leah Kirchmann	Road race	2:44:46	20
Simone Boilard	Time trial	43:08.73	14
Alison Jackson	Time trial	42:53.07	11
Leah Kirchmann	Time trial	42:55.62	13

=== Track ===
Keirin

Athlete	Event	1st Round	Repechage	Semifinals	Final
Athlete	Event	Rank	Rank	Rank	Rank
Ryan Dodyk	Men's keirin	3 R	3	did not advance	
Tyler Rorke	Men's keirin	6 R	4	did not advance	
Nick Wammes	Men's keirin	4 R	DSQ	did not advance	
Lauriane Genest	Women's keirin	1 Q	—N/a	5 FB	7
Kelsey Mitchell	Women's keirin	1 Q	—N/a	1 Q	3rd place, bronze medalist(s)
Sarah Orban	Women's keirin	3 R	1 Q	6 FB	9

Sprint

Athlete	Event	Qualification		Round 1	Quarterfinals	Semifinals	Final	
Athlete	Event	Time	Rank	Opposition Time	Opposition Time	Opposition Time	Opposition Time	Rank
Ryan Dodyk	Men's sprint	9.920	9 Q	Wammes (CAN); W	Paul (TTO); L	did not advance		
Tyler Rorke	Men's sprint	9.986	11 Q	Turnbull (ENG); L	did not advance			
Nick Wammes	Men's sprint	9.860	8 Q	Dodyk (CAN); L	did not advance			
Ryan Dodyk; Tyler Rorke; Nick Wammes	Men's team sprint	44.071	4 QB	—N/a			New Zealand; L 44.573–43.856	4
Lauriane Genest	Women's sprint	10.674	3 Q	King (NZL); W	Andrews (NZL); L	did not advance		
Kelsey Mitchell	Women's sprint	10.612	1 Q	Petch (NZL); W	Edmunds (WAL); W	Finucane (WAL); W	Andrews (NZL); L	2nd place, silver medalist(s)
Sarah Orban	Women's sprint	10.887	7 Q	Bell (SCO); W	Capewell (ENG); L	did not advance		
Lauriane Genest; Kelsey Mitchell; Sarah Orban	Women's team sprint	47.956	2 QG	—N/a			New Zealand; L 48.001–47.425	2nd place, silver medalist(s)

Time trial

Athlete	Event	Time	Rank
Ryan Dodyk	Men's time trial	1:01.786	11
Riley Pickrell	Men's time trial	1:03.627	15
Nick Wammes	Men's time trial	1:01.443	9
Devaney Collier	Women's time trial	36.595	17
Kelsey Mitchell	Women's time trial	33.294	2nd place, silver medalist(s)
Sarah Orban	Women's time trial	35.174	14

Points race

Athlete	Event	Final	
Athlete	Event	Points	Rank
Michael Foley	Men's point race	DNF	
Mathias Guillemette	Men's point race	DNF	
Riley Pickrell	Men's point race	DNF	
Ngaire Barraclough	Women's points race	DNF	
Ariane Bonhomme	Women's points race	5	12
Maggie Coles-Lyster	Women's points race	27	4

Pursuit

Athlete	Event	Qualification		Final	
Athlete	Event	Time	Rank	Opponent Results	Rank
Michael Foley	Men's individual pursuit	4:18.259	13	did not advance	
Mathias Guillemette	Men's individual pursuit	4:20.927	14	did not advance	
Riley Pickrell	Men's individual pursuit	4:26.385	16	did not advance	
Michael Foley; Derek Gee; Mathias Guillemette; Riley Pickrell	Men's team pursuit	4:03.618	5	did not advance	
Ariane Bonhomme	Women's individual pursuit	3:32.582	8	did not advance	
Devaney Collier	Women's individual pursuit	3:38.566	13	did not advance	
Maggie Coles-Lyster	Women's individual pursuit	3:28.218	7	did not advance	
Ngaire Barraclough; Ariane Bonhomme; Maggie Coles-Lyster; Devaney Collier	Women's team pursuit	4:24.701	5	did not advance	

Scratch race

Athlete	Event	Qualification	Final
Michael Foley	Men's scratch race	7 Q	12
Derek Gee	Men's scratch race	DNF	Did not advance
Mathias Guillemette	Men's scratch race	DSQ	Did not advance
Ariane Bonhomme	Women's scratch race	—N/a	10
Maggie Coles-Lyster	Women's scratch race	—N/a	3rd place, bronze medalist(s)
Devaney Collier	Women's scratch race	—N/a	11

== Diving ==
Canada's diving team of ten athletes (five per gender) was named on June 27, 2022.

Men

Athlete	Events	Semifinal		Final	
Athlete	Events	Points	Rank	Points	Rank
Cédric Fofana	1 m springboard	366.60	6 Q	357.70	7
Bryden Hattie	1 m springboard	344.15	8 Q	350.05	8
Cédric Fofana	3 m springboard	272.60	14	did not advance	
Bryden Hattie	3 m springboard	388.60	7 Q	373.70	9
Benjamin Tessier	10 m platform	402.65	2 Q	440.30	5
Rylan Wiens	10 m platform	404.00	4 Q	492.80	2nd place, silver medalist(s)
Nathan Zsombor-Murray	10 m platform	395.70	7 Q	447.85	4
Rylan Wiens; Nathan Zsombor-Murray	10 m synchronised platform	—N/a		413.85	2nd place, silver medalist(s)

Women

Athlete	Events	Semifinal		Final	
Athlete	Events	Points	Rank	Points	Rank
Margo Erlam	1 m springboard	229.75	7 Q	239.25	9
Mia Vallée	1 m springboard	292.20	1 Q	291.85	1st place, gold medalist(s)
Margo Erlam	3 m springboard	270.00	9 Q	309.65	5
Mia Vallée	3 m springboard	302.10	2 Q	329.25	3rd place, bronze medalist(s)
Renée Batalla	10 m platform	250.05	13	did not advance	
Caeli McKay	10 m platform	302.70	4 Q	317.50	3rd place, bronze medalist(s)
Celina Toth	10 m platform	297.30	5 Q	298.40	6
Margo Erlam; Mia Vallée	3 m synchronised springboard	—N/a		297.00	3rd place, bronze medalist(s)
Caeli McKay; Celina Toth	10 m synchronised platform	—N/a		286.08	5

Mixed

Athlete	Events	Final	
Athlete	Events	Points	Rank
Bryden Hattie; Margo Erlam	3 m synchronised springboard	288.60	6
Rylan Wiens; Celina Toth	10 m synchronised platform	296.46	5

== Field hockey ==
By virtue of their position in the FIH World Rankings for men and women respectively (as of 1 February 2022), Canada qualified for both tournaments.

Detailed fixtures were released on 9 March 2022.

Summary

Key:

- FT = After full time
- P = Match decided by penalty-shootout

Team	Event	Preliminary round					Semifinal	Final / BM / PM	
Team	Event	Opposition Result	Opposition Result	Opposition Result	Opposition Result	Rank	Opposition Result	Opposition Result	Rank
Canada men	Men's tournament	Wales; L 1–5	Ghana; D 1–1	India; L 0–8	England; L 2–11	4	—N/a	Pakistan; L 3–4; Seventh place match	8
Canada women	Women's tournament	Wales; W 4–0	England; L 0–1	Ghana; W 8–1	India; L 2–3	3	—N/a	Scotland; W 3–1; Fifth place match	5

=== Men's tournament ===
Roster

Canada's roster of 18 athletes was announced on July 4, 2022.

- Gavin Bains
- Alexander Bird
- Fin Boothroyd
- Tristan Burgoyne
- Taylor Curran
- Roopkanwar Dhillon
- Brendan Guraliuk
- Manveer Jhamat
- Ethan McTavish
- Devohn Noronha-Teixeira
- Balraj Panesar
- Keegan Pereira
- Matthew Sarmento
- Oliver Scholfield
- Harbir Sidhu
- Gurpreet Singh
- John Smythe
- Floris van Son

Pool B

Pos	Team	Pld	W	D	L	GF	GA	GD	Pts	Qualification
1	India	4	3	1	0	27	5	+22	10	Semi-finals
2	England (H)	4	3	1	0	25	8	+17	10	Semi-finals
3	Wales	4	2	0	2	14	10	+4	6	Fifth place match
4	Canada	4	0	1	3	4	25	−21	1	Seventh place match
5	Ghana	4	0	1	3	2	24	−22	1	Ninth place match

Source: Birmingham 2022
Rules for classification: 1) points; 2) number of wins; 3) goal difference; 4) goals scored; 5) head-to-head results.
(H) Hosts

30 July 2022
11:00

Canada	1–5	Wales
Sarmento 59'	Report	Furlong 8', 12', 14', 49'; Griffiths 45'

Umpires:
David Tomlinson (NZL)
Fraser Bell (SCO)

1 August 2022
19:00

Ghana	1–1	Canada
Kwofie 19'	Report	Pereira 60'

Umpires:
Deepak Joshi (IND)
Peter Kabaso (KEN)

3 August 2022
14:00

Canada	0–8	India
	Report	Harmanpreet 7', 56'; Amit 10'; Lalit 20'; Gurjant 27'; Akashdeep 37', 60'; Mandeep 58'

Umpires:
Peter Kabaso (KEN)
Ilanggo Kanabathu (MAS)

4 August 2022
16:00

Canada	2–11	England
Guraliuk 11', 56'	Report	Roper 2', 45'; Bandurak 16', 38', 50', 59'; Ansell 19'; Wallace 24', 44'; Rushmere 54'; Ward 55'

Umpires:
Deepak Joshi (IND)
Steve Rogers (AUS)

Seventh place match

6 August 2022
11:15

Pakistan	4–3	Canada
Rana 24'; Ali 25'; Umar Bhutta 52'; Shahid 60'	Report	Sarmento 26', 58'; Pereira 30'

Umpires:
Fraser Bell (SCO)
Tim Bond (NZL)

=== Women's tournament ===
Roster

Canada's roster of 18 athletes was announced on July 4, 2022.

- Alexis de Armond
- Grace Delmotte
- Jordyn Faiczak
- Sara Goodman
- Rowan Harris
- Hannah Haughn
- Karli Johansen
- Chloe Walton
- Marcia LaPlante
- Melanie Scholz
- Sara McManus
- Anna Mollenhauer
- Audrey Sawers
- Madeline Secco
- Natalie Sourisseau
- Brienne Stairs
- Madison Thompson
- Amanda Woodcroft

Pool A

Pos	Team	Pld	W	D	L	GF	GA	GD	Pts	Qualification
1	England (H)	4	4	0	0	21	1	+20	12	Semi-finals
2	India	4	3	0	1	12	6	+6	9	Semi-finals
3	Canada	4	2	0	2	14	5	+9	6	Fifth place match
4	Wales	4	1	0	3	5	12	−7	3	Seventh place match
5	Ghana	4	0	0	4	1	29	−28	0	Ninth place match

Source: Birmingham 2022
Rules for classification: 1) points; 2) number of wins; 3) goal difference; 4) goals scored; 5) head-to-head results.
(H) Hosts

29 July 2022
16:00

Canada	4–0	Wales
Haughn 21'; Stairs 33', 50'; McManus 45'	Report

Umpires:
Amber Church (NZL)
Binish Hayat (PAK)

31 July 2022
19:00

Canada	0–1	England
	Report	Toman 20'

Umpires:
Cookie Tan (SGP)
Aleisha Neumann (AUS)

2 August 2022
11:00

Ghana	1–8	Canada
Berko 51'	Report	Walton 7'; Delmotte 13', 47'; Thompson 14'; McManus 17', 17'; Stairs 49'; Secco 59'

Umpires:
Aleisha Neumann (AUS)
Rhiannon Murrie (AUS)

3 August 2022
11:00

Canada	2–3	India
Stairs 23'; Haughn 39'	Report	Salima 3'; Navneet 22'; Lalremsiami 51'

Umpires:
Katrina Turner (NZL)
Hannah Harrison (ENG)

Fifth place match

7 August 2022
11:15

Canada	3–1	Scotland
Haughn 4', 17'; Johansen 41'	Report	Costello 15'

Umpires:
Katrina Turner (NZL)
Hannah Harrison (ENG)

== Gymnastics ==
Canada's gymnastics team of 14 athletes (six men and eight women) was named on July 8, 2022.

=== Artistic ===
Canada's artistic gymnastics team consisted of five men and five women. René Cournoyer was injured and not replaced on the team.

Men
Team Final & Individual Qualification

Athlete	Event	Apparatus						Total	Rank
Athlete	Event	F	PH	R	V	PB	HB	Total	Rank
Chris Kaji	Team	12.550	—N/a	14.100 Q	14.350	13.900	12.800	—N/a	—N/a
Félix Dolci	Team	13.450 Q	~~10.600~~	14.400 Q	14.250 Q	14.400 Q	12.800	79.900	5 Q
Jayson Rampersad	Team	~~10.450~~	13.250 Q	—N/a	—N/a	—N/a	—N/a	—N/a	—N/a
Mathys Jalbert	Team	—N/a	12.050	~~11.200~~	~~13.000~~	~~12.700~~	12.450	—N/a	—N/a
Kenji Tamane	Team	12.650	13.300 Q	13.750	13.600	13.150	~~12.050~~	78.500	8 Q
Total	Team	38.650	38.600	42.250	42.200	41.450	38.050	241.200	2nd place, silver medalist(s)

Individual Finals

Athlete	Event	Apparatus						Total	Rank
Athlete	Event	F	PH	R	V	PB	HB	Total	Rank
Chris Kaji	Rings	—N/a		14.266	—N/a			14.266	3rd place, bronze medalist(s)
Félix Dolci	All-around	14.200	11.200	14.000	14.500	14.000	13.650	81.550	4
Félix Dolci	Floor	14.166	—N/a					14.166	2nd place, silver medalist(s)
Félix Dolci	Rings	—N/a		13.966	—N/a			13.966	5
Félix Dolci	Vault	—N/a			13.899	—N/a		13.899	4
Félix Dolci	Parallel bars	—N/a				14.200	—N/a	14.200	4
Jayson Rampersad	Pommel horse	—N/a	14.000	—N/a				14.000	3rd place, bronze medalist(s)
Kenji Tamane	All-around	13.100	13.200	12.700	12.750	13.200	13.200	78.150	8
Kenji Tamane	Pommel horse	—N/a	10.833	—N/a				10.833	8

Women
Team final & Individual Qualification

Athlete	Event	Apparatus				Total	Rank
Athlete	Event	V	UB	BB	F	Total	Rank
Laurie Denommée	Team	13.650 Q	12.450	~~11.700~~	12.650	50.450	7 Q
Jenna Lalonde	Team	13.050	12.950 Q	12.000	~~12.200~~	50.200	9
Cassie Lee	Team	—N/a	—N/a	12.100	13.000 Q	—N/a	—N/a
Emma Spence	Team	13.400 Q	12.550 Q	12.150 Q	12.750 Q	50.850	5 Q
Maya Zonneveld	Team	~~13.000~~	~~10.550~~	—N/a	—N/a	—N/a	—N/a
Total	Team	40.100	37.950	36.250	38.400	152.700	3rd place, bronze medalist(s)

Individual Finals

Athlete	Event	Apparatus				Total	Rank
Athlete	Event	V	UB	BB	F	Total	Rank
Laurie Denommée	All-around	13.200	12.450	10.900	13.150	49.700	7
Laurie Denommée	Vault	13.233	—N/a			13.233	2nd place, silver medalist(s)
Jenna Lalonde	Uneven bars	—N/a	13.333	—N/a		13.333	5
Cassie Lee	Floor	—N/a			12.900	12.900	5
Emma Spence	All-around	13.550	12.950d	13.050	12.800	52.350	3rd place, bronze medalist(s)
Emma Spence	Vault	13.050	—N/a			13.050	4
Emma Spence	Uneven bars	—N/a	12.733	—N/a		12.733	6
Emma Spence	Balance beam	—N/a		13.066	—N/a	13.066	3rd place, bronze medalist(s)
Emma Spence	Floor	—N/a			12.966	12.966	4

=== Rhythmic ===
Canada's rhythmic gymnastics team consisted of three women.

Team final & Individual Qualification

Athlete	Event	Apparatus				Total	Rank
Athlete	Event	Hoop	Ball	Clubs	Ribbon	Total	Rank
Tatiana Cocsanova	Team	28.300 Q	27.900 Q	~~25.100~~	~~21.200~~	102.500	14
Carmel Kallemaa	Team	28.300 Q	26.650	29.700 Q	27.000 Q	111.650	2 Q
Suzanna Shahbazian	Team	26.300	27.350 Q	26.000	25.450	105.100	7 Q
Total	Team	82.900	81.900	55.700	52.450	272.950	1st place, gold medalist(s)

Individual Finals

Athlete	Event	Apparatus				Total	Rank
Athlete	Event	Hoop	Ball	Clubs	Ribbon	Total	Rank
Tatiana Cocsanova	Hoop	27.100	—N/a			27.100	5
Tatiana Cocsanova	Ball	—N/a	28.200	—N/a		28.200	6
Carmel Kallemaa	All-around	27.300	26.350	27.100	27.000	107.750	6
Carmel Kallemaa	Hoop	28.200	—N/a			28.200	3rd place, bronze medalist(s)
Carmel Kallemaa	Clubs	—N/a		29.100	—N/a	29.100	2nd place, silver medalist(s)
Carmel Kallemaa	Ribbon	—N/a			27.500	27.500	3rd place, bronze medalist(s)
Suzanna Shahbazian	All-around	28.700	26.600	25.100	25.700	106.100	8
Suzanna Shahbazian	Ball	—N/a	29.050	—N/a		29.050	2nd place, silver medalist(s)

== Judo ==
Canada's nine member judo team (five men and four women) was announced on June 21, 2022. The team consisted of established athletes and younger athletes.

Men

Athlete	Event	Round of 16	Quarterfinal	Semifinal	Repechage	Final / BM	
Athlete	Event	Opposition Result	Opposition Result	Opposition Result	Opposition Result	Opposition Result	Rank
François Gauthier-Drapeau	81 kg	Alhassan (GHA); W 10–00	Weithers (BAR); W 10–0s2	Fleming (NIR); W 10s1–0s1	Bye	Moorhead (ENG); L 00–10s1	2nd place, silver medalist(s)
Mohab Elnahas	81 kg	Taleka (NRU); W 10–00	Connolly (NZL); W 10–00	Moorhead (ENG); L 01s1–11s1	Bye	Weithers (BAR); W 10–0s1	3rd place, bronze medalist(s)
Shady Elnahas	100 kg	Bye	Takayawa (FIJ); W 10–00	Lovell-Hewitt (ENG); W 10–0s3	Bye	Reyes (CAN); 1s1–0s2	1st place, gold medalist(s)
Kyle Reyes	100 kg	Bye	Koster (NZL); W 10–0s1	Thompson (ENG); W 10–00	Bye	Elnahas (CAN); 0s2–1s1	2nd place, silver medalist(s)
Marc Deschenes	+100 kg	Bye	Koster (CYP); W 10–0s1	Park (AUS); W 10–00	Bye	Andrews (NZL); W 10–00	1st place, gold medalist(s)

Women

Athlete	Event	Round of 16	Quarterfinal	Semifinal	Repechage	Final / BM	
Athlete	Event	Opposition Result	Opposition Result	Opposition Result	Opposition Result	Opposition Result	Rank
Kelly Deguchi	52 kg	Bye	Marsh (SCO); W 10s2–0s1	Matia (CMR); W 11–0	Bye	Easton (AUS); L 0s2–1s2	2nd place, silver medalist(s)
Christa Deguchi	57 kg	Bye	Tariyal (IND); W 11–0	Nairne (ENG); W 01–00	Bye	Toprak (ENG); W 10s2–0s2	1st place, gold medalist(s)
Catherine Beauchemin-Pinard	63 kg	Bye	Rahming (BAH); W 10s1–0s1	Rahming (CMR); W 10–00	Bye	Howell (ENG); 10s2–0s2	1st place, gold medalist(s)
Coralie Godbout	78 kg	—N/a	Sophina (CMR); W 10–0s2	Powell (WAL); L 00–10	Bye	Tytler (SCO); L 00–10	5

== Lawn bowls ==
Canada's lawn bowls team will consist of ten athletes (five per gender) competing in the able-bodied events, it was announced on June 9, 2022. The team was selected based on results at a training camp held in Windsor, Ontario during May 2022.

Men

Athlete	Event	Group Stage					Quarterfinal	Semifinal	Final / BM	
Athlete	Event	Opposition Score	Opposition Score	Opposition Score	Opposition Score	Rank	Opposition Score	Opposition Score	Opposition Score	Rank
Ryan Bester	Singles	Tagelagi (NIU); W 21–11	Dixon (NFK); W 21–8	Salmon (WAL); W 21–10	Kelly (NIR); L 13–21	2 Q	McLean (SCO); L 4–21	did not advance		
Ryan Bester; John Bezear	Pairs	New Zealand; W 15–11	Jersey; L 13–20	Scotland; L 11–18	Niue; W 20–9	3	did not advance			
Rob Law; Cam Lefresne; Greg Wilson	Triples	South Africa; W 17–10	Malaysia; L 14–15	England; L 8–36	—N/a	4	did not advance			
John Bezear; Rob Law; Cam Lefresne; Greg Wilson	Fours	Northern Ireland; W 13–12	Australia; W 19–6	Niue; W 18–4	—N/a	1 Q	India; L 10–14	did not advance		

Women

Athlete	Event	Group Stage				Quarterfinal	Semifinal	Final / BM	
Athlete	Event	Opposition Score	Opposition Score	Opposition Score	Rank	Opposition Score	Opposition Score	Opposition Score	Rank
Jordan Kos	Singles	Beere (GGY); L 7–21	Mbugua (KEN); L 16–21	Ryan (AUS); L 17–21	4	did not advance			
Jacqueline Foster; Jordan Kos	Pairs	Wales; D 16–16	Brunei; L 12–15	Australia; L 6–40	4	did not advance			
Leanne Chinery; Jennifer MacDonald; Kelly McKerihen	Triples	Norfolk Island; W 22–10	Fiji; L 10–19	Malaysia; L 17–18	3	did not advance			
Leanne Chinery; Jacqueline Foster; Jennifer MacDonald; Kelly McKerihen	Fours	Cook Islands; L 11–14	England; L 16–23	India; L 7–17	4	did not advance			

== Rugby sevens ==
Canada qualified for both the men's and women's tournaments, for a total of 26 athletes (13 per team). This was achieved through their positions in the 2018–19 / 2019–20 World Rugby Sevens Series and 2018–19 / 2019–20 World Rugby Women's Sevens Series respectively.

Summary

team	Event	Preliminary round				Quarterfinal / CQ	Semifinal / CS	Final / BM / PF	
team	Event	Opposition Result	Opposition Result	Opposition Result	Rank	Opposition Result	Opposition Result	Opposition Result	Rank
Canada men	Men's tournament	Wales; W 31–0	Fiji; L 12–19	Zambia; W 24–12	2 Q	South Africa; L 0–33	Samoa; L 17–19	—N/a	=7
Canada women	Women's tournament	New Zealand; L 7–45	England; W 26–19	Sri Lanka; W 74–0	2 Q	—N/a	Fiji; L 7–24	New Zealand; L 12–19	4

=== Men's tournament ===
Roster
Canada's 13 member team was announced on July 12, 2022.

- Nick Allen
- Phil Berna
- Ciaran Breen
- D’Shawn Bowen
- Cooper Coats
- Elias Hancock
- Lachlan Kratz
- Josiah Morra
- Anton Ngongo
- Matthew Oworu
- Alex Russell
- Jake Thiel
- Brock Webster

Preliminary round
Pool C

Pos	Team	Pld	W	D	L	PF	PA	PD	Pts	Qualification
1	Fiji	3	3	0	0	109	36	+73	9	Advance to Quarter-finals
2	Canada	3	2	0	1	67	31	+36	7	Advance to Quarter-finals
3	Wales	3	1	0	2	62	74	−12	5	Advance to classification Quarter-finals
4	Zambia	3	0	0	3	17	114	−97	3	Advance to classification Quarter-finals

Source: Birmingham2022
Rules for classification: 1) Points; 2) Head-to-head result; 3) Point difference; 4) Points scored.

29 July 2022
12:40

Canada	31–0	Wales
Try: Russell (2) 3' m, 8' c Coats 5' m Thiel 7' c Oworu 13' c Con: Coats (3/5) 7', 8', 13'; Cards: Morra (yellow card) 13'	Report	Cards: T. Williams (yellow card) 11'

Coventry Stadium, Coventry
Referee: Finlay Brown (Scotland)

29 July 2022
21:32

Fiji	19–12	Canada
Try: Mocenacagi 1' c Josua Vakurunabili 3' m Mocenacagi 4' c Con: Nacuqu (2/3) 1', 5'; Cards: Naduvalo (yellow card) 12'	Report	Try: Webster 7' m Penalty try 12'; Con: Coats (0/1)

Coventry Stadium, Coventry
Referee: Ben Breakspear (Wales)

30 July 2022
12:40

Canada	24–12	Zambia
Try: Morra 3' m Morra 7' c Bowen 8' c Allen 12' m Con: Coats (2/3) 7', 9'; Webster (0/1)	Report	Try: Banda 2' m Kaushiku 5' c Con: Mukosa (0/1); Mwewa (1/1) 5'; Cards: Bwalya (yellow card) 7' Banda (yellow card) 8'

Coventry Stadium, Coventry
Referee: Tevita Rokovereni (Fiji

Quarterfinals

30 July 2022
20:48

South Africa	33–0	Canada
Try: Brown (2) 1' c, 9' m Grobbelaar 5' c A. Davids 7' c Ndhlovu 12' c Con: Brown (2/2) 1', 6'; S. Davids (1/2) 7'; Human (1/1) 12'; Cards: Brown (yellow card) 7'	Report

Coventry Stadium, Coventry
Referee: Finlay Brown (Scotland)

5th–8th Semi-finals

31 July 2022
12:20

Samoa	19–17	Canada
Try: Onosai (2) 6' c, 11' c Sione 9' m Con: Matavao (2/3) 6', 11'; Cards: Afa (yellow card) 8'	Report	Try: Thiel (2) 1' c, 3' m Coats 14' m Con: Coats (1/3) 1'

Coventry Stadium, Coventry
Referee: Morné Ferreira (South Africa)

=== Women's tournament ===
Roster
Canada's 13 member team was announced on July 12, 2022.

- Olivia Apps
- Fancy Bermudez
- Pamphinette Buisa
- Emma Chown
- Chloe Daniels
- Olivia De Couvreur
- Bianca Farella
- Renee Gonzalez
- Nakisa Levale
- Piper Logan
- Breanne Nicholas
- Krissy Scurfield
- Keyara Wardley

Preliminary round
Pool A

Pos	Team	Pld	W	D	L	PF	PA	PD	Pts	Qualification
1	New Zealand	3	3	0	0	143	14	+129	9	Semi-finals
2	Canada	3	2	0	1	107	64	+43	7	Semi-finals
3	England	3	1	0	2	83	64	+19	5	Classification semi-finals
4	Sri Lanka	3	0	0	3	0	191	−191	3	Classification semi-finals

Source: Birmingham2022
Rules for classification: 1) Points; 2) Head-to-head result; 3) Point difference; 4) Points scored.

29 July 2022
10:06

New Zealand	45–7	Canada
Try: Woodman 2' c Blyde (2) 4' m, 8' c Fluhler 7' m Brazier 11' c Pouri-Lane 12' c Saili 14' c Con: Nathan-Wong (2/4) 3', 8'; Pouri-Lane (3/3) 11', 13', 14'	Report	Try: Daniels 10' c Con: Apps (1/1) 10'; Cards: Gonzalez (yellow card) 2'

Coventry Stadium, Coventry
Referee: Tyler Miller (Australia)

29 July 2022
18:36

Canada	26–19	England
Try: Wardley 5' c Farella (2) 7', 8' c Scurfield 9' c Con: Apps (3/4) 5', 9', 10'	Report	Try: Boatman 1' m Crompton 11' c Cowell 14' c Con: Jones (1/2) 14'; Norman-Bell (1/1) 12'; Cards: Boatman (yellow card) 8'

Coventry Stadium, Coventry
Referee: Lauren Jenner (New Zealand)

30 July 2022
09:44

Canada	74–0	Sri Lanka
Try: Scurfield (5) 1' m, 3' m, 5' c, 6' m, 8' m De Couvreur (2) 4' c, 7' c Farella 8' c Levale 10' c Logan 11' m Wardley (2) 12' c, 14' c Con: Nicholas (5/8) 4', 5', 7', 9', 10'; Apps (2/3) 13', 14'	Report

Coventry Stadium, Coventry
Referee: Ashleigh Murray-Pretorius (South Africa)

Semifinals

30 July 2022
20:04

Fiji	24–7	Canada
Try: Buleki 1' c Uluinisau (2) 2' m, 12' c Riwai 3' m Con: Uluinisau (1/1) 1'; Naimasi (0/2); Cavuru (1/1) 12'	Report	Try: Nicholas 7' c Con: Apps (1/1) 7'

Coventry Stadium, Coventry
Referee: Lauren Jenner (New Zealand)

Bronze medal match

31 July 2022
19:50

New Zealand	19–12	Canada
Try: Blyde 1' m Brazier 4' c Saili 11' c Con: Nathan-Wong (1/2) 5'; Pouri-Lane (1/1) 11'	Report	Try: Logan 12' c Chown 14' m Con: Apps (1/2) 13'; Cards: Scurfield (yellow card) 1'

Coventry Stadium, Coventry
Referee: Tyler Miller (Australia)

== Squash ==
Canada's four member squash team (two men and two women) was named on June 21, 2022. Hollie Naughton became the first Canadian women to win a Commonwealth Games medal in the sport of squash.

Individual

Athlete	Event	Round of 64	Round of 32	Round of 16	Quarterfinals	Semifinals	Final	
Athlete	Event	Opposition Score	Opposition Score	Opposition Score	Opposition Score	Opposition Score	Opposition Score	Rank
David Baillargeon	Men's singles	Mc Quan (TTO); W 3–0	Creed (WAL); W 3–1	Ghosal (IND); L 0–3	did not advance			
Nick Sachvie	Men's singles	Kalengo (ZAM); W 3–1	Chileshe (NZL); W 3–2	Ng (MAS); L 0–3	did not advance			
Nicole Bunyan	Women's singles	Bye	Sinaly (SRI); W 3–0	Kennedy (ENG); L 0–3	did not advance			
Hollie Naughton	Women's singles	Bye	Sultana (MLT); W 3–0	Azman (MAS); W 3–0	Chinappa (IND); W 3–0	King (NZL); W 3–1	Kennedy (ENG); L 1–3	2nd place, silver medalist(s)

Doubles

Athlete	Event	Round of 32	Round of 16	Quarterfinals	Semifinals	Final	
Athlete	Event	Opposition Score	Opposition Score	Opposition Score	Opposition Score	Opposition Score	Rank
David Baillargeon; Nick Sachvie	Men's doubles	Kadoma / Kawooya (UGA); W 2–0	Creed / Evans (WAL); W 2–0	Selby / Waller (ENG); L 1–2	did not advance		
Nicole Bunyan; Hollie Naughton	Women's doubles	Bye	Yiwen / Ampandi (MAS); L 0–2	did not advance			
David Baillargeon; Nicole Bunyan	Mixed doubles	West / Stafford (CAY); L 0–2	did not advance				
Nick Sachvie; Hollie Naughton	Mixed doubles	Knaggs / Mc Quan (TTO); W 2–0	Adderley / Stewart (SCO); L 0–2	did not advance			

== Swimming ==
Canada's able-bodied swimming team of 23 athletes (10 men and 13 women) was officially named on April 11, 2022, after the conclusion of the Canadian Swim Trials in Victoria, British Columbia. On May 9, 2022, the para-swimming team of eight athletes (three men and four women) was also named. The announcement also confirmed swimmer Stephen Calkins would replace Yuri Kisil due to the latter's injury. On June 15, 2022, Penny Oleksiak withdrew from the team, citing preparations for the 2023 season into the 2024 Summer Olympics. On June 17, 2022, Mabel Zavaros was named as Oleksiak's replacement. Sydney Pickrem also withdrew for personal reasons and was not replaced.

Men

Athlete	Event	Heat		Semifinal		Final	
Athlete	Event	Time	Rank	Time	Rank	Time	Rank
Stephen Calkins	50 m freestyle	23.01	16 Q	22.66	12	did not advance	
Joshua Liendo	50 m freestyle	22.49	5 Q	21.92	2 Q	22.02	3rd place, bronze medalist(s)
Nicolas-Guy Turbide	50 m freestyle S13	—N/a				24.32	1st place, gold medalist(s)
Stephen Calkins	100 m freestyle	48.96	5 Q	49.42	10	did not advance	
Ruslan Gaziev	100 m freestyle	48.84	3 Q	48.54	4 Q	48.54	4
Joshua Liendo	100 m freestyle	48.54	1 Q	48.69	5 Q	48.66	7
Jeremy Bagshaw	200 m freestyle	1:49.57	17	—N/a		did not advance	
Ruslan Gaziev	200 m freestyle	1:48.59	10	—N/a		did not advance	
Nicholas Bennett	200 m freestyle S14	—N/a				1:54.97 GR	1st place, gold medalist(s)
Jeremy Bagshaw	400 m freestyle	3:52.62	11	—N/a		did not advance	
Eric Brown	400 m freestyle	3:52.88	12	—N/a		did not advance	
Eric Brown	1500 m freestyle	15:38.83	6 Q	—N/a		15:25.48	6
Javier Acevedo	50 m backstroke	25.48	7 Q	25.29	=5 Q	24.97 NR	3rd place, bronze medalist(s)
Javier Acevedo	100 m backstroke	54.99	9 Q	54.81	9	did not advance	
James Dergousoff	50 m breaststroke	28.04	12 Q	27.83	11	did not advance	
James Dergousoff	100 m breaststroke	1:01.79	13 Q	1:00.86	10	did not advance	
James Dergousoff	200 m breaststroke	2:14.36	6 Q	—N/a		2:13.85	7
Finlay Knox	50 m butterfly	24.14	15 Q	23.77	13	did not advance	
Joshua Liendo	50 m butterfly	23.82	9 Q	23.51	=4 Q	23.42	6
Finlay Knox	100 m butterfly	52.97	10 Q	52.19	6 Q	52.20	7
Joshua Liendo	100 m butterfly	51.36	1 Q	51.85	4 Q	51.24	1st place, gold medalist(s)
Alec Elliot	100 m butterfly S10	—N/a				59.38	5
Patrick Hussey	200 m butterfly	1:59.41	12	—N/a		did not advance	
Javier Acevedo	200 m individual medley	did not start		—N/a		did not advance	
Collyn Gagne	200 m individual medley	2:01.82	11	—N/a		did not advance	
Finlay Knox	200 m individual medley	1:59.67	2 Q	—N/a		1:58.95	4
Collyn Gagne	400 m individual medley	4:19.63	4 Q	—N/a		4:19.32	7
Javier Acevedo; Joshua Liendo; Ruslan Gaziev; Finlay Knox; Eric Brown^{[a]} Jeremy Bagshaw^{[a]} Stephen Calkins^{[a]}	4 × 100 m freestyle relay	3:20.24	4 Q	—N/a		3:13.01	3rd place, bronze medalist(s)
Javier Acevedo; Jeremy Bagshaw; Ruslan Gaziev; Finlay Knox	4 × 200 m freestyle relay	—N/a				7:12.68	5
Javier Acevedo; Stephen Calkins; James Dergousoff; Patrick Hussey	4 × 100 m medley relay	DSQ		—N/a		did not advance	

Women

Athlete	Event	Heat		Semifinal		Final	
Athlete	Event	Time	Rank	Time	Rank	Time	Rank
Katerine Savard	100 m freestyle	55.61	8 Q	55.41	8 Q	55.22	8
Rebecca Smith	100 m freestyle	55.32	5 Q	55.03	7 Q	55.09	7
Katarina Roxon	100 m freestyle S9	1:07.26	6 Q	—N/a		1:07.13	7
Katrina Bellio	200 m freestyle	1:59.78	6 Q	—N/a		2:00.05	7
Mary-Sophie Harvey	200 m freestyle	2:00.35	11	—N/a		did not advance	
Katrina Bellio	400 m freestyle	4:15.37	9	—N/a		did not advance	
Ella Jansen	400 m freestyle	4:11.02	5 Q	—N/a		4:10.69	7
Summer McIntosh	400 m freestyle	4:07.36	2 'Q	—N/a		3:59.32 WJR	2nd place, silver medalist(s)
Katrina Bellio	800 m freestyle	8:42.42	6 Q	—N/a		8:42.07	5
Mabel Zavaros	800 m freestyle	8:40.31	5 Q	—N/a		8:53.50	7
Maggie Mac Neil	50 m backstroke	did not start					
Kylie Masse	50 m backstroke	27.57	1 Q	27.47 GR	1 Q	27.31 GR	1st place, gold medalist(s)
Mary-Sophie Harvey	100 m backstroke	1:00.98	6 Q	1:00.59	6 Q	1:00.72	6
Kylie Masse	100 m backstroke	58.93	1 Q	58.83	1 Q	58.73	2nd place, silver medalist(s)
Camille Berube	100 m backstroke S8	—N/a				1:26.00	4
Kylie Masse	200 m backstroke	2:11.27	2 Q	—N/a		2:07.81	2nd place, silver medalist(s)
Sophie Angus	50 m breaststroke	31.55	9 Q	31.45	9	did not advance	
Sophie Angus	100 m breaststroke	1:08.99	9 Q	1:08.63	11	did not advance	
Camille Berube	100 m breaststroke SB6	—N/a				1:43.81	3rd place, bronze medalist(s)
Danielle Kisser	100 m breaststroke SB6	—N/a				1:50.04	4
Tessa Cieplucha	200 m breaststroke	2:30.04	8 Q	—N/a		2:28.43	7
Maggie Mac Neil	50 m butterfly	26.24	1 Q	26.19	3 Q	26.17	4
Katerine Savard	50 m butterfly	26.57	3 Q	26.42	8 Q	26.43	8
Maggie Mac Neil	100 m butterfly	57.94	2 Q	57.72	2 Q	56.36 GR	1st place, gold medalist(s)
Katerine Savard	100 m butterfly	58.56	5 Q	58.57	5 Q	58.09	5
Rebecca Smith	100 m butterfly	58.89	6 Q	58.59	6 Q	59.54	8
Ella Jansen	200 m butterfly	2:11.51	9	—N/a		did not advance	
Mabel Zavaros	200 m butterfly	2:10.94	6 Q	—N/a		2:12.23	8
Mary-Sophie Harvey	200 m individual medley	2:13.18	3 Q	—N/a		2:12.48	6
Summer McIntosh	200 m individual medley	2:12.12	1 Q	—N/a		2:08.70 WJR	1st place, gold medalist(s)
Aurelie Rivard	200 m individual medley SM10	—N/a				2:34.26	2nd place, silver medalist(s)
Katarina Roxon	200 m individual medley SM10	—N/a				2:43.98	6
Tessa Cieplucha	400 m individual medley	4:42.99	5 Q	—N/a		4:42.27	8
Ella Jansen	400 m individual medley	4:42.02	3 Q	—N/a		4:40.17	5
Summer McIntosh	400 m individual medley	4:36.72	1 Q	—N/a		4:29.01 WJR, AR, CR	1st place, gold medalist(s)
Maggie Mac Neil; Summer McIntosh; Katerine Savard; Rebecca Smith	4 × 100 m freestyle relay	—N/a				3:37.25	3rd place, bronze medalist(s)
Ella Jansen; Summer McIntosh; Katerine Savard; Mary-Sophie Harvey	4 × 200 m freestyle relay	—N/a				7:51.98	2nd place, silver medalist(s)
Sophie Angus; Kylie Masse; Maggie Mac Neil; Summer McIntosh	4 × 100 m medley relay	—N/a				3:56.59	2nd place, silver medalist(s)

Mixed

Athlete	Event	Heat		Final	
Athlete	Event	Time	Rank	Time	Rank
Javier Acevedo; Joshua Liendo; Rebecca Smith; Maggie Mac Neil; Ruslan Gaziev^{[a]} Stephen Calkins^{[a]} Ella Jansen^{[a]} Mary-Sophie Harvey^{[a]}	4 × 100 m freestyle relay	3:28.20	3 Q	3:24.86	3rd place, bronze medalist(s)
Kylie Masse; James Dergousoff; Maggie Mac Neil; Ruslan Gaziev; Javier Acevedo^{[a]} Sophie Angus^{[a]} Patrick Hussey^{[a]} Rebecca Smith^{[a]}	4 × 100 m medley relay	3:51.43	3 Q	3:43.98	2nd place, silver medalist(s)

^{a} Swimmers who participated in the heats only and received medals.

== Table tennis ==
By virtue of its position in the ITTF World Team Rankings (as of 2 January 2020), Canada qualified both a men's and a women's team.

An initial squad of six was selected following their performances at the National Selection Team Tournament between 25 and 27 March 2022. The full squad of eight was later confirmed on 7 April 2022. Two Para-sport athletes were also named to the team.

Singles

Athletes	Event	Group stage				Round of 32	Round of 16	Quarterfinal	Semifinal	Final / BM	
Athletes	Event	Opposition Score	Opposition Score	Opposition Score	Rank	Opposition Score	Opposition Score	Opposition Score	Opposition Score	Opposition Score	Rank
Hongtao Chen	Men's singles	Jones (RSA); W 4−0	Yiangou (CYP); W 4−2	—N/a	1 Q	Pang (SGP); L 1−4	did not advance				
Jeremy Hazin	Men's singles	Bye				Yogarajah (MRI); W 4−0	Walker (ENG); L 0−4	did not advance			
Eugene Wang	Men's singles	Bye				Evans (WAL); W 4−1	Quek (SGP); L 3−4	did not advance			
Muhammad Mudassar	Men's singles C3–5	Sule (NGR); L 0−3	Chen (AUS); W 3−2	Hunter-Spivey (ENG); L 0−3	3	—N/a			did not advance		
Asad Hussain Syed	Men's singles C8–10	Ma (AUS); L 0−3	Olufemi (NGR); W 3−0 WO	Wilson (ENG); L 0−3	3	—N/a			did not advance		
Ching Nam Fu	Women's singles	Nimal (MDV); W 4−2	Qwea (VAN); W 4−0	Li (FIJ); W 4−1	1 Q	Batra (IND); L 0−4	did not advance				
Katherine Morin	Women's singles	Sifi (SOL); W 4−0	Sultana (BAN); W 4−0 WO	—N/a	1 Q	Lay (AUS); L 0−4	did not advance				
Mo Zhang	Women's singles	Bye				Patel (RSA); W 4−0	Earley (NIR); W 4−3	Akula (IND); L 3−4	did not advance		

Doubles

Athletes	Event	Round of 64	Round of 32	Round of 16	Quarterfinal	Semifinal	Final / BM	
Athletes	Event	Opposition Score	Opposition Score	Opposition Score	Opposition Score	Opposition Score	Opposition Score	Rank
Jeremy Hazin; Edward Ly	Men's doubles	Bye	Cathcart / Skelton (NIR); W 3−0	Lum / Liu (AUS); L 1−3	did not advance			
Eugene Wang; Hongtao Chen	Men's doubles	Bye	Mcreery / Wilson (NIR); W 3−0	Chew / Poh (SGP); L 1−3	did not advance			
Mo Zhang; Ching Nam Fu	Women's doubles	Bye	Chang / Tee (MAS); W 3−2	Carey / Hursey (WAL); L 0−3	did not advance			
Katherine Morin; Sophie Gauthier	Women's doubles	Bye	Wu Zhang / Whitton (WAL); L 2−3	did not advance				
Jeremy Hazin; Ching Nam Fu	Mixed doubles	Bye	Franklin / Cummings (GUY); W 3−0	Jarvis / Bardsley (ENG); L 2−3	did not advance			
Sophie Gauthier; Edward Ly	Mixed doubles	Bye	Wykes / Silcock (JER); W 3−0	Pitchford / Ho (ENG); L 0−3	did not advance			
Eugene Wang; Mo Zhang	Mixed doubles	Bye	Evans / Carey (WAL); W 3−0	Choong / Lyne (MAS); L 1−3	did not advance			

Team

Athletes	Event	Group stage				Quarterfinal	Semifinal	Final / BM	
Athletes	Event	Opposition Score	Opposition Score	Opposition Score	Rank	Opposition Score	Opposition Score	Opposition Score	Rank
Jeremy Hazin; Hongtao Chen; Eugene Wang; Edward Ly	Men's team	Mauritius; W 3–0	Australia; L 2–3	Malaysia; W 3–1	1 Q	Singapore; L 0–3	did not advance		
Sophie Gauthier; Mo Zhang; Katherine Morin; Ching Nam Fu	Women's team	Uganda; W 3–0	Vanuatu; W 3–0	Wales; L 2–3	2 Q	Australia; L 0–3	did not advance		

== Triathlon ==
Canada's team of eight triathletes (three men and five women) was announced on June 30, 2022. For the first time ever, Canada qualified an entry into paratriathlon.

Individual

Athlete	Event	Swim (750 m)	Trans 1	Bike (20 km)	Trans 2	Run (5 km)	Total	Rank
Tyler Mislawchuk	Men's	8:51	0:51	DNF				
Charles Paquet	Men's	8:44	0:58	26:07	0:22	15:47	51:58	10
Martin Sobey	Men's	8:45	0:52	26:09	0:16	15:56	51:58	11
Dominika Jamnicky	Women's	9:47	0:58	29:12	0:20	17:43	58:00	13
Amélie Kretz	Women's	9:40	1:04	29:11	0:18	17:50	58:03	15
Emy Legault	Women's	9:30	0:55	29:09	0:21	17:36	57:31	10
Jessica Tuomela; Emma Skaug (Guide)	Women's PTVI	13:39	1:38	31:35	0:48	27:32	1:15:12	3rd place, bronze medalist(s)

Mixed Relay

Athletes	Event	Total Times per Athlete (Swim 250 m, Bike 7 km, Run 1.5 km)	Total Group Time	Rank
Tyler Mislawchuk; Emy Legault; Charles Paquet; Dominika Jamnicky	Mixed relay	18:31; 20:56; 19:01; 21:33	1:20:01	6

== Weightlifting ==
Canada qualified 14 weightlifters (six men and eight women), all of whom were officially selected on 24 March 2022. Boady Santavy, Maya Laylor and Kristel Ngarlem qualified at the 2021 Commonwealth Weightlifting Championships in Tashkent, Uzbekistan. The other 11 qualified through their respective Commonwealth Weightlifting ranking as of 28 February 2022.

Men

Athlete	Event	Snatch		Clean & Jerk		Total	Rank
Athlete	Event	Result	Rank	Result	Rank	Total	Rank
Youri Simard	61 kg	119	3	149	4	268	4
Shad Darsigny	73 kg	135	3	163	4	298	3rd place, bronze medalist(s)
Nicolas Vachon	81 kg	140	4	180	3	320	3rd place, bronze medalist(s)
Boady Santavy	96 kg	did not start					
Pierre-Alexandre Besette	109 kg	163	3	186	6	349	4
Quinn Everett	+109 kg	157	7	201	=6	358	7

Women

Athlete	Event	Snatch		Clean & Jerk		Total	Rank
Athlete	Event	Result	Rank	Result	Rank	Total	Rank
Hannah Kaminski	49 kg	74	4	97	2	171	3rd place, bronze medalist(s)
Rachel Leblanc-Bazinet	55 kg	82	4	96	4	178	4
Tali Darsigny	59 kg	87	2	109	3	196	3rd place, bronze medalist(s)
Maude Charron	64 kg	101 GR	1	130 GR	1	231 GR	1st place, gold medalist(s)
Alexis Ashworth	71 kg	91	5	123	2	214	2nd place, silver medalist(s)
Maya Laylor	76 kg	100	1	128 GR	1	228 GR	1st place, gold medalist(s)
Kristel Ngarlem	87 kg	101	3	135	2	236	2nd place, silver medalist(s)
Emma Friesen	+87 kg	106	4	132	4	238	4

== Wrestling ==
Canada's wrestling team consisted of 12 athletes (six male and six female). The team was announced on June 14, 2022. All 12 members of the wrestling team won a medal each. The Canadian team won three gold, five silver and four bronze medals in total.

Freestyle
Men

Athlete	Event	Round of 16	Quarterfinal	Semifinal	Repechage	Final / BM	
Athlete	Event	Opposition Result	Opposition Result	Opposition Result	Opposition Result	Opposition Result	Rank
Darthe Capellan	57 kg	Bye	Giordmaina (MLT); W 12–2 (VSU1)	Welson (NGR); L 4–8 (VPO1)	—N/a	Jakobo Tau (RSA); W 12–2 (VSU1)	3rd place, bronze medalist(s)
Lachlan McNeil	65 kg	Bye	Connelly (SCO); W 10–0 (VSU)	Ullah (PAK); W 11–0 (VSU)	Bye	Punia (IND); L 2–9 (VPO1)	2nd place, silver medalist(s)
Jasmit Phulka	74 kg	Cojocaru (SCO); W 7–5 (VPO1)	Tahir (PAK); L 1–5 (VPO1)	Did not advance	Vake (TGA); W 11–0 (VSU)	Cole Hawkins (NZL); W 11–1 (VSU1)	3rd place, bronze medalist(s)
Alex Moore	86 kg	Agiomor (NGR); W 10–0 (VSU)	Fernando (SRI); W 10–0 (VSU)	Punia (IND); L 1–3 (VPO1)	Bye	Oxenham (NZL); W 10–0 (VSU)	3rd place, bronze medalist(s)
Nishan Randhawa	97 kg	Bye	Nehra (IND); W 8–6 VPO1	Raza (PAK); W 7–0 (VPO)	—N/a	de Lange (RSA); W 9–3 (VPO1)	1st place, gold medalist(s)
Amar Dhesi	125 kg	Bye	Johnson (JAM); W 10–0 (VSU)	Grewal (IND); W 12–2 (VSU1)	—N/a	Anwar (PAK); W 9–2 (VFA)	1st place, gold medalist(s)

Women

Athlete	Event	Group Stage			Semifinal	Final / BM	
Athlete	Event	Opposition Result	Opposition Result	Rank	Opposition Result	Opposition Result	Rank
Madison Parks	50 kg	Genesis (NGR); L 0–9 (VPO)	Pedige (SRI); W 12–0 (VSU	2 Q	Gehlot (IND); W 9–6 (VPO)	Genesis (NGR); L 1–3 (VFA)	2nd place, silver medalist(s)

Athlete	Event	Nordic Round Robin				Rank
Athlete	Event	Opposition Result	Opposition Result	Opposition Result	Record W/L	Rank
Samantha Stewart	53 kg	Phogat (IND); L 0–2 (VFA)	Maduravalage Don (SRI); W 12–2 (VSU1)	Adekuoroye (NGR); W 6–5 (VPO1)	2–1	2nd place, silver medalist(s)

Athlete	Event	Round of 16	Quarterfinal	Semifinal	Repechage	Final / BM	
Athlete	Event	Opposition Result	Opposition Result	Opposition Result	Opposition Result	Opposition Result	Rank
Hannah Taylor	57 kg	Bye	Lim (SGP); W 10–0 (VSU)	Adekuoroye (NGR); L 0–10 (VSU)	Bye	Ayieta (KEN); W 4–0 (VFA)	3rd place, bronze medalist(s)
Ana Godinez	62 kg	—N/a	Fountain (SCO); W 10–0 (VSU)	Kolawole (NGR); W 10–4 (VPO1)	—N/a	Malik (IND); L 4–4 (VFA)	2nd place, silver medalist(s)
Linda Morais	68 kg	Bye	Aza (MRI); W 6–0 (VFA)	Ford (NZL); W 6–4 (VPO1)	Bye	Oborududu (NGR); L 1–5 (VPO1)	2nd place, silver medalist(s)
Justina Di Stasio	76 kg	—N/a	de Bruine (AUS); W 10–0 (VSU)	Sihag (IND); W 6–0 (VPO)	—N/a	Rueben (NGR); W 4–2 (VPO)	1st place, gold medalist(s)

== See also ==
- Canada at the 2022 Winter Olympics
- Canada at the 2022 Winter Paralympics
- Canada at the 2022 World Aquatics Championships
- Canada at the 2022 World Athletics Championships
