= 3x3 basketball at the 2022 Commonwealth Games – Women's tournament =

Women's 3x3 basketball tournament at the 2022 Commonwealth Games
- Venue: Smithfield
- Dates: 29 July – 2 August 2022
- Competitors: 32 from 8 nations

Medalists
| gold medal | Taya Hanson; Rosalie Mercille; Sarah Te-Biasu; Tara Wallack | Canada |
| silver medal | Shanice Beckford-Norton; Cheridene Green; Chantelle Handy; Hannah Jump | England |
| bronze medal | Lauren Mansfield; Lauren Scherf; Marena Whittle; Alex Wilson | Australia |

The women's 3x3 basketball tournament at the 2022 Commonwealth Games was held in a temporary Games-time venue at the brownfield site in Smithfield between 29 July and 2 August 2022. Canada won the gold medal, defeating England in the final. Australia won the bronze medal.

== Qualification ==
England qualified as host nation and the other nations qualified by FIBA 3x3 Federation Ranking. Special arrangements were in place to ascertain the recipient of the quota place earned by Great Britain.

| Means of qualification | Date | Location | Quotas | Qualified |
|---|---|---|---|---|
| Host Nation | —N/a | —N/a | 1 | England |
| FIBA 3x3 Federation Rankings (Regional Qualification) | 1 November 2021 | —N/a | 5 | Kenya; Canada; Sri Lanka; ~~Saint Lucia~~ (Note: Saint Lucia declined their invitation, citing inadequate preparation for the tournament. The Caribbean quota place was reallocated to the British Virgin Islands.); British Virgin Islands; New Zealand |
| FIBA 3x3 Federation Rankings (Direct Qualification) | 1 November 2021 | —N/a | 1 | Australia |
| Home Nations Qualifier (Note: The Home Nations are affiliated with FIBA as a combined national federation (Great Britain). Since Great Britain was the top European women's nation, a qualifying tournament between the Home Nations (excluding England, who already qualified as hosts) was held to determine the recipient of the associated quota place.) | 6 April 2022 | (Scotland) Largs | 1 | Scotland |
| TOTAL | | | 8 | |

== Rosters ==
| CGA | Players | | | |
|---|---|---|---|---|
| Australia | Lauren Scherf | Lauren Mansfield | Marena Whittle | Alex Wilson |
| British Virgin Islands | Shauliqua Fahie | Mahkayla Pickering | Keithrece Smith | Joy Victor |
| Canada | Taya Hanson | Rosalie Mercille | Sarah Te-Biasu | Tara Wallack |
| England | Shanice Beckford-Norton | Cheridene Green | Chantelle Handy | Hannah Jump |
| Kenya | Victoria Reynolds | Madina Okot | Hilda Indasi | Melissa Otieno |
| New Zealand | Tiarna Clarke | Gabriella Fotu | Jillian Harmon | Kalani Purcell |
| Scotland | Kennedy Leonard | Claire Paxton | Sian Phillips | Hannah Robb |
| Sri Lanka | Nihari Perera | Chalani Perera | Fathima Morseth | Rashmi Perera |

== Competition format ==
Eight teams were drawn into two groups. Upon completion of the group stage, the top-ranked team in each group advances directly to the semi-finals; the two middle-ranked teams in each group progress to the quarter-finals.

== Group stage ==
All times based on British Summer Time (UTC+01:00)

=== Group A ===
| Pos | Team | Pld | W | L | PF | PA | PD | Qualification |
|---|---|---|---|---|---|---|---|---|
| 1 | Australia | 3 | 3 | 0 | 63 | 26 | +37 | Direct to semi-finals |
| 2 | Scotland | 3 | 2 | 1 | 45 | 40 | +5 | Quarter-finals |
| 3 | Kenya | 3 | 1 | 2 | 50 | 44 | +6 | Quarter-finals |
| 4 | Sri Lanka | 3 | 0 | 3 | 15 | 63 | −48 | |

Source: Birmingham 2022
Rules for classification: 1) Wins; 2) Head-to-head record; 3) Points scored.

29 July 2022
15:30

Report

| Australia | 21–9 | Scotland |
| Pts: Wilson 7 | | Pts: Leonard 5 |

Smithfield

29 July 2022
15:30

Report

| Kenya | 21–8 | Sri Lanka |
| Pts: Indasi, Okot 8 | | Pts: N.Perera, R.Perera 3 |

Smithfield

29 July 2022
19:30

Report

| Scotland | 21–5 | Sri Lanka |
| Pts: Leonard 8 | | Pts: R.Perera 3 |

Smithfield

29 July 2022
19:30

Report

| Australia | 21–15 | Kenya |
| Pts: Scherf 9 | | Pts: Otieno 5 |

Smithfield

31 July 2022
15:30

Report

| Sri Lanka | 2–21 | Australia |
| Pts: Morseth 2 | | Pts: Whittle 8 |

Smithfield

31 July 2022
15:30

Report

| Kenya | 14–15 | Scotland |
| Pts: Indasi 6 | | Pts: Leonard 9 |

Smithfield

=== Group B ===
| Pos | Team | Pld | W | L | PF | PA | PD | Qualification |
|---|---|---|---|---|---|---|---|---|
| 1 | New Zealand | 3 | 3 | 0 | 55 | 30 | +25 | Direct to semi-finals |
| 2 | England (H) | 3 | 2 | 1 | 57 | 37 | +20 | Quarter-finals |
| 3 | Canada | 3 | 1 | 2 | 50 | 48 | +2 | Quarter-finals |
| 4 | British Virgin Islands | 3 | 0 | 3 | 16 | 63 | −47 | |

Source: Birmingham 2022
Rules for classification: 1) Wins; 2) Head-to-head record; 3) Points scored.
(H) Hosts

30 July 2022
15:30

Report

| British Virgin Islands | 6–22 | Canada |
| Pts: Pickering, Fahie 2 | | Pts: Mercille, Wallack 7 |

Smithfield

30 July 2022
15:30

Report

| New Zealand | 15–14 | England |
| Pts: Harmon 7 | | Pts: Green 7 |

Smithfield

30 July 2022
19:30

Report

| Canada | 11–21 | New Zealand |
| Pts: Te-Biasu 6 | | Pts: Clarke 9 |

Smithfield

30 July 2022
19:30

Report

| England | 22–5 | British Virgin Islands |
| Pts: Jump 14 | | Pts: Victor 3 |

Smithfield

31 July 2022
19:30

Report

| New Zealand | 19–5 | British Virgin Islands |
| Pts: Harmon 10 | | Pts: Fahie 4 |

Smithfield

31 July 2022
19:30

Report

| England | 21–17 | Canada |
| Pts: Jump 9 | | Pts: Te-Biasu 12 |

Smithfield

== Knockout stage ==
Quarter-finals
1 August
England | 21
Kenya | 12
1 August
Scotland | 11
Canada | 17

Semi-finals
1 August
Australia | 15
England | 21
1 August
New Zealand | 11
Canada | 16

Gold medal match
2 August
England | 13
Canada | 14
Bronze medal match
2 August
Australia | 15
New Zealand | 13

=== Quarter-finals ===
1 August 2022
15:30

Report

| Scotland | 11–17 | Canada |
| Pts: Paxton, Phillips, Leonard 3 | | Pts: Wallack 6 |

Smithfield

1 August 2022
17:30

Report

| England | 21–12 | Kenya |
| Pts: Jump 8 | | Pts: Otieno 4 |

Smithfield

=== Semi-finals ===
1 August 2022
19:30

Report

| Australia | 15–21 | England |
| Pts: Mansfield 8 | | Pts: Green 8 |

Smithfield

1 August 2022
19:30

Report

| New Zealand | 11–16 | Canada |
| Pts: Harmon, Fotu 4 | | Pts: Wallack 8 |

Smithfield

=== Bronze medal match ===
2 August 2022
15:00

Report

| Australia | 15–13 | New Zealand |
| Pts: Whittle 9 | | Pts: Harmon 7 |

Smithfield

=== Gold medal match ===
2 August 2022
19:30

Report

| England | 13–14 | Canada |
| Pts: Beckford-Norton 6 | | Pts: Te-Biasu 7 |

Smithfield

== Final ranking ==
| Rank | Team |
|---|---|
| 1st place, gold medalist(s) | Canada |
| 2nd place, silver medalist(s) | England |
| 3rd place, bronze medalist(s) | Australia |
| 4 | New Zealand |
| 5 | Scotland |
| 6 | Kenya |
| 7 | British Virgin Islands |
| 8 | Sri Lanka |
