= British Virgin Islands at the 2022 Commonwealth Games =

- Flag of the British Virgin Islands
- CG code: IVB
- CGA: British Virgin Islands Olympic Committee
- Website: bviolympics.org

in Birmingham, England 28 July 2022 – 8 August 2022
- Competitors: 17 (9 men and 8 women) in 4 sports
- Flag bearers (opening): Rikkoi Brathwaite; Beyoncé Defreitas
- Flag bearer (closing): TBD
- Medals Ranked 26th: Gold 1 Silver 0 Bronze 0 Total 1

Commonwealth Games appearances (overview)
- 1990; 1994; 1998; 2002; 2006; 2010; 2014; 2018; 2022; 2026; 2030

The British Virgin Islands competed at the 2022 Commonwealth Games in Birmingham, England between 28 July – 8 August 2022. It was the team's ninth appearance at the Games.

The British Virgin Islands team consisted of 19 athletes (ten men and nine women) competing in four sports. Rikkoi Brathwaite and Beyoncé Defreitas were the country's flagbearers during the opening ceremony.

== Medalists ==
Medal	Name	Sport	Event	Date
Gold	Kyron McMaster	Athletics	Men's 400 m hurdles	6 August

== Competitors ==
The following is the list of number of competitors participating at the Games per sport/discipline.

Sport	Men	Women	Total
Athletics	5	4	9
3x3 basketball	0	4	4
Cycling	2	0	2
Squash	2	0	2
Total	9	8	17

== Athletics ==
A squad of eleven athletes was announced on 11 July 2022.

Men
Track and road events

Athlete	Event	Heat		Semifinal		Final	
Athlete	Event	Result	Rank	Result	Rank	Result	Rank
Rikkoi Brathwaite	100 m	10.28	2 Q	10.31	4	Did not advance	
Adriano Gumbs	400 m	48.87	6	Did not advance			
Kyron McMaster	400 m hurdles	49.78	2 Q	—N/a		48.93	1st place, gold medalist(s)

Field events

Athlete	Event	Qualification		Final	
Athlete	Event	Distance	Rank	Distance	Rank
Eldred Henry	Shot put	—N/a		19.97	5
Djimon Gumbs	Shot put	—N/a		17.18	10
Djimon Gumbs	Discus throw	53.32	14	Did not advance	

Women
Track and road events

Athlete	Event	Heat		Semifinal		Final	
Athlete	Event	Result	Rank	Result	Rank	Result	Rank
Beyoncé Defreitas	200 m	23.99	2 Q	23.81	6	Did not advance	
Deya Erickson	100 m hurdles	13.94	5	—N/a		Did not advance	

Field events

Athlete	Event	Qualification		Final	
Athlete	Event	Distance	Rank	Distance	Rank
Trevia Gumbs	Shot put	13.27	13	Did not advance	
Tynelle Gumbs	Hammer throw	46.90	16	Did not advance	

== 3x3 basketball ==
Saint Lucia, the top Commonwealth Caribbean federation in the FIBA 3x3 Federation Rankings for women (on 1 November 2021), declined their invitation to play in the women's tournament. As the next-highest ranked Caribbean federation, the British Virgin Islands received the reallocated invitation.

Four players were announced on 11 July 2022.

Summary

Team	Event	Group stage				Quarterfinal	Semifinal	Final / BM / CM	
Team	Event	Opposition Score	Opposition Score	Opposition Score	Rank	Opposition Score	Opposition Score	Opposition Score	Rank
British Virgin Islands women's	Women's tournament	Canada; L 6 - 22	England; L 5 - 22	New Zealand; L 5 - 19	4	Did not advance			

=== Women's tournament ===
Roster

- Shauliqua Fahie
- Mahkayla Pickering
- Keithrece Smith
- Joy Victor

Group play

Pos	Team	Pld	W	L	PF	PA	PD	Qualification
1	New Zealand	3	3	0	55	30	+25	Direct to semi-finals
2	England (H)	3	2	1	57	37	+20	Quarter-finals
3	Canada	3	1	2	50	48	+2	Quarter-finals
4	British Virgin Islands	3	0	3	16	63	−47	

Source: Birmingham 2022
Rules for classification: 1) Wins; 2) Head-to-head record; 3) Points scored.
(H) Hosts

30 July 2022
15:30

Report

British Virgin Islands	6–22	Canada
Pts: Pickering, Fahie 2		Pts: Mercille, Wallack 7

Smithfield

30 July 2022
19:30

Report

England	22–5	British Virgin Islands
Pts: Jump 14		Pts: Victor 3

Smithfield

31 July 2022
19:30

Report

New Zealand	19–5	British Virgin Islands
Pts: Harmon 10		Pts: Fahie 4

Smithfield

== Cycling ==
Two cyclists were announced on 11 July 2022.

=== Road ===
Men

Athlete	Event	Time	Rank
Darel Christopher	Road race	DNF	
Sam Talbot	Road race	DNF	
Darel Christopher	Time trial	58:06.36	41
Sam Talbot	Time trial	56:06.67	37

== Squash ==
Two players were announced on 11 July 2022.

Athlete	Event	Round of 64	Round of 32	Round of 16	Quarterfinals	Semifinals	Final	
Athlete	Event	Opposition Score	Opposition Score	Opposition Score	Opposition Score	Opposition Score	Opposition Score	Rank
Joe Chapman	Men's singles	Singh (IND); L 0 - 3	Did not advance					
Luca Reich	Men's singles	Evans (WAL); L 0 - 3	Did not advance					
Joe Chapman; Luca Reich	Men's doubles	—N/a	Senthikumar / Singh (IND); L 0 - 2	Did not advance				
