= Luke Pople =

Australian wheelchair basketball player

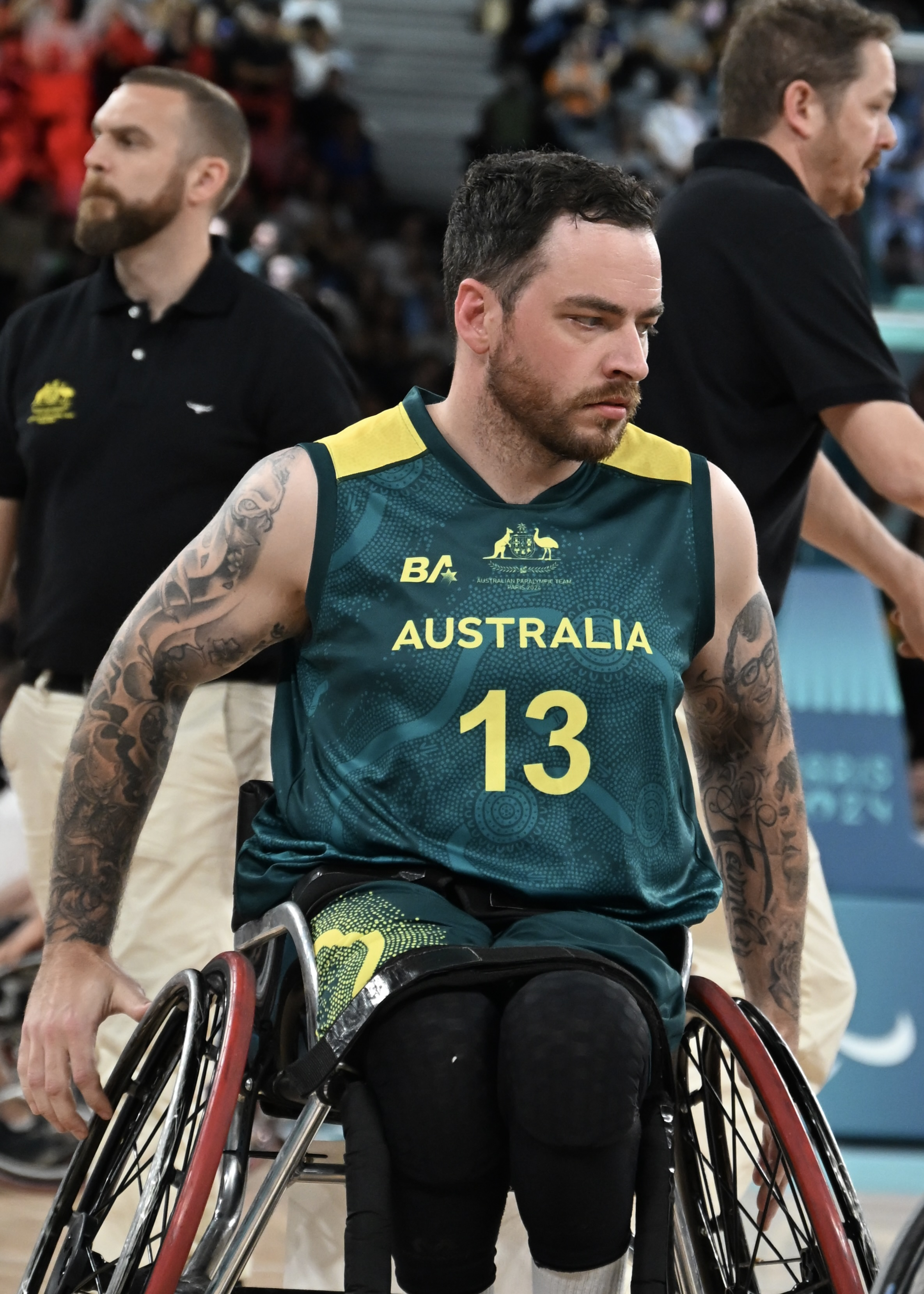
- Pople at the 2024 Summer Paralympics

Personal information
- Born: 6 June 1991 (age 35) Wollongong, NSW, Australia

Sport
- Position: Point guard
- Disability class: 2.5
Medal record
Representing Australia
Men's wheelchair basketball
World Championship
Gold medal – first place	2014 Incheon	Team
Gold medal – first place	2026 Ottawa	Team
Bronze medal – third place	2018 Hamburg	Team
Men's 3x3 wheelchair basketball
Commonwealth Games
Gold medal – first place	2022 Birmingham	Team
Gold medal – first place	2026 Glasgow	Team

Luke Pople (born 6 June 1991) is a wheelchair basketball player from Australia. He was a member of the Rollers team at the 2024 Summer Paralympics, his first Games.

== Early life ==
Pople was born on 6 June 1991 with spina bifida. He began using a wheelchair at eight. As of 2018, he lives in Dapto, New South Wales.

== Career ==
Pople started playing wheelchair basketball at age thirteen. He plays for the Wollongong Roller Hawks in the National Wheelchair Basketball League. In 2013, we was a member of the Australian Spinners that won to bronze at the International Wheelchair Basketball Federation Under 23 World Championships. He was a member of the Rollers that won the gold medal at the 2014 Men's World Wheelchair Basketball Championship in Incheon, Japan. In 2018, he was a member of the Rollers that won the bronze medal at 2018 Wheelchair Basketball World Championship in Hamburg, Germany. At the

Pople was a member of the Australian Team that won the gold medal in the 3x3 men's tournament at the 2022 Commonwealth Games.

At the 2024 Paris Paralympics, he was a member of the Rollers that finished fifth with a win/loss record of 4-4.

He was a member of the Rollers that defeated Italy 81 - 57 to win the gold medal at the 2026 Wheelchair Basketball World Championships in Ottawa, Canada.
