= 3x3 basketball at the 2022 Commonwealth Games – Men's wheelchair tournament =

Men's 3x3 wheelchair basketball tournament at the 2022 Commonwealth Games
- Venue: Smithfield
- Dates: 29 July – 2 August 2022
- Competitors: 23 from 6 nations

Medalists
gold medal	Luke Pople; Lachlin Dalton; Kurt Thompson; Jake Kavanagh	Australia
silver medal	Vincent Dallaire; Colin Higgins; Robert Hedges	Canada
bronze medal	Tyler Baines; Lee Manning; Charlie McIntyre; Abderrahim Taghrest	England

The men's 3x3 wheelchair basketball tournament at the 2022 Commonwealth Games were held in a temporary Games-time venue at the brownfield site in Smithfield between 29 July and 2 August 2022.

The discipline of wheelchair basketball made its sport debut at the Commonwealth Games. Australia won the gold medal, defeating Canada in the final. England won the bronze medal.

== Qualification ==
England qualified as host nation, two nations qualified by winning their respective IWBF zonal qualifiers, and the rest received Bipartite Invitations. Five of the six Commonwealth Games regions are represented.

Means of qualification	Date	Location	Quotas	Qualified
Host Nation	—N/a	—N/a	1	England
IWBF Africa Qualifier	9 October 2021	(South Africa) Johannesburg	1	South Africa
IWBF Europe Qualifier	14 April 2022	(Scotland) Largs	1	Northern Ireland
Bipartite Invitation (Note: The men's IWBF Americas and Asia/Oceania Qualifiers were cancelled, so two additional invitations (one per Zone) were sent instead.)	22 April 2022	—N/a	3	Australia; Canada; Malaysia
TOTAL			6	

Qualifier scheduling issue

== Rosters ==
CGA	Players			
Australia	Luke Pople	Lachlin Dalton	Kurt Thompson	Jake Kavanagh
Canada	Vincent Dallaire	Colin Higgins	Robert Hedges	—N/a
England	Tyler Baines	Lee Manning	Abderrahim Taghrest	Charlie McIntyre
Malaysia	Ahmad Nazri Hamzah	Muhammad Roozaimi Johari	Muhamad Atib Zakaria	Freday Tan Yei Bing
Northern Ireland	James MacSorley	Conn Nagle	Nathan McCabe	Matthew Rollston
South Africa	Allen Mtatase	Ayabonga Jim	Cecil Dumond	Simanga Mbhele

== Competition format ==
Six teams were drawn into two groups. Upon completion of the group stage, the top two teams in each group advance to the semi-finals; the remaining two teams contest a match for fifth / sixth place.

== Group stage ==
All times based on British Summer Time (UTC+01:00)

=== Group A ===
Pos	Team	Pld	W	L	PF	PA	PD	Qualification
1	England (H)	2	2	0	38	11	+27	Semi-finals
2	Malaysia	2	1	1	22	25	−3	Semi-finals
3	South Africa	2	0	2	8	30	−22	5th place match

Source: Birmingham 2022
Rules for classification: 1) Wins; 2) Head-to-head record; 3) Points scored.
(H) Hosts

29 July 2022
15:30

Report

England	17–2	South Africa
Pts: Manning 6		Pts: Mtatase 2

Smithfield

30 July 2022
15:30

Report

Malaysia	9–19	England
Pts: Zakaria 5		Pts: Manning 9

Smithfield

31 July 2022
15:30

Report

South Africa	6–13	Malaysia
Pts: Dumond 3		Pts: Hamzah 5

Smithfield

=== Group B ===
Pos	Team	Pld	W	L	PF	PA	PD	Qualification
1	Canada	2	1	1	24	18	+6	Semi-finals
2	Australia	2	1	1	24	24	0	Semi-finals
3	Northern Ireland	2	1	1	16	22	−6	5th place match

Source: Birmingham 2022
Rules for classification: 1) Wins; 2) Head-to-head record; 3) Points scored.

29 July 2022
19:30

Report

Canada	11–13	Australia
Pts: Higgins 7		Pts: Dalton 8

Smithfield

30 July 2022
19:30

Report

Northern Ireland	5–13	Canada
Pts: McCabe 3		Pts: Higgins 6

Smithfield

31 July 2022
19:30

Report

Australia	9–11	Northern Ireland
Pts: Dalton, Pople 5		Pts: Nagle 5

Smithfield

== Knockout stage ==
Semi-finals
1 August
England	11
Australia	12
1 August
Canada	14
Malaysia	9

Gold medal match
2 August
Australia	11
Canada	9
Bronze medal match
2 August
England	21
Malaysia	11

=== Fifth place match ===
2 August 2022
15:00

Report

Northern Ireland	10–7	South Africa
Pts: Macsorley 6		Pts: Mbhele 7

Smithfield

=== Semi-finals ===
1 August 2022
19:30

Report

England	11–12	Australia
Pts: Manning 7		Pts: Pople, Kavanagh 4

Smithfield

1 August 2022
19:30

Report

Canada	14–9	Malaysia
Pts: Hedges 5		Pts: Johari, Tan Yei Bing 3

Smithfield

=== Bronze medal match ===
2 August 2022
15:00

Report

England	21–11	Malaysia
Pts: McIntyre 8		Pts: Zakaria 6

Smithfield

=== Gold medal match ===
2 August 2022
19:30

Report

Australia	11–9	Canada
Pts: Pople 6		Pts: Higgins 5

Smithfield

== Final ranking ==
Rank	Team
1st place, gold medalist(s)	Australia
2nd place, silver medalist(s)	Canada
3rd place, bronze medalist(s)	England
4	Malaysia
5	Northern Ireland
6	South Africa
