= 3x3 basketball at the 2022 Commonwealth Games – Men's tournament =

Men's 3x3 basketball tournament at the 2022 Commonwealth Games
- Venue: Smithfield
- Dates: 29 July – 2 August 2022
- Competitors: 32 from 8 nations

Medalists
gold medal	Jamell Anderson; Kayne Henry; Myles Hesson; Orlan Jackman	England
silver medal	Greg Hire; Daniel Johnson; Jesse Wagstaff; Thomas Wright	Australia
bronze medal	Bikramjit Gill; Alex Johnson; Jordan Jensen-Whyte; Adam Paige	Canada

The men's 3x3 basketball tournament at the 2022 Commonwealth Games was held in a temporary Games-time venue at the brownfield site in Smithfield between 29 July and 2 August 2022. The first time a 3x3 basketball tournament was held as part of the Commonwealth Games, hosts England won the gold medal defeating Australia in the final. Canada won the bronze medal.

== Qualification ==
England qualified as host nation and the other nations qualified by FIBA 3x3 Federation Ranking. Special arrangements were in place to ascertain the recipient of the quota place earned by Great Britain.

Means of qualification	Date	Location	Quotas	Qualified
Host Nation	—N/a	—N/a	1	England
FIBA 3x3 Federation Rankings (Regional Qualification)	1 November 2021	—N/a	5	Kenya; Canada; Sri Lanka; Trinidad and Tobago; New Zealand
FIBA 3x3 Federation Rankings (Direct Qualification)	1 November 2021	—N/a	1	Australia
Home Nations Qualifier (Note: The Home Nations are affiliated with FIBA as a combined national federation (Great Britain). Since Great Britain was the top European men's nation, a qualifying tournament between the Home Nations (excluding England, who already qualified as hosts) was held to determine the recipient of the associated quota place.)	6 April 2022	(Scotland) Largs	1	Scotland
TOTAL			8	

== Rosters ==
CGA	Players			
Australia	Greg Hire	Daniel Johnson	Jesse Wagstaff	Thomas Wright
Canada	Alex Johnson	Bikramjit Gill	Jordan Jensen-Whyte	Adam Paige
England	Jamell Anderson	Kayne Henry	Myles Hesson	Orlan Jackman
Kenya	Faheem Juma	George Omondi	Larry Shavanga	John Wijass
New Zealand	Jayden Bezzant	Dominique Kelman-Poto	Nikau McCullough	Tai Wynyard
Scotland	Gareth Murray	Fraser Malcolm	Jonathan Bunyan	Kyle Jimenez
Sri Lanka	Simron Yogananthan	Janith Chathuranga	Supun Rukshan	Arnold Thevakumar
Trinidad and Tobago	Adrian Joseph	Kemrick Julien	Steven Lewis	Sheldon Christian

== Competition format ==
Eight teams were drawn into two groups. Upon completion of the group stage, the top-ranked team in each group advances directly to the semi-finals; the two middle-ranked teams in each group progress to the quarter-finals.

== Group stage ==
All times based on British Summer Time (UTC+01:00)

=== Group A ===
Pos	Team	Pld	W	L	PF	PA	PD	Qualification
1	Scotland	3	3	0	52	43	+9	Direct to semi-finals
2	Canada	3	2	1	56	41	+15	Quarter-finals
3	Kenya	3	1	2	47	48	−1	Quarter-finals
4	Sri Lanka	3	0	3	35	58	−23	

Source: Birmingham 2022
Rules for classification: 1) Wins; 2) Head-to-head record; 3) Points scored.

29 July 2022
15:30

Report

Canada	15–12	Kenya
Pts: Gill 5		Pts: Omondi 6

Smithfield

29 July 2022
15:30

Report

Sri Lanka	9–16	Scotland
Pts: Yogananthan 5		Pts: Malcolm 8

Smithfield

29 July 2022
19:30

Report

Scotland	21–20	Canada
Pts: Malcolm 9		Pts: Gill, Jensen-Whyte, Johnson 6

Smithfield

29 July 2022
19:30

Report

Kenya	21–18	Sri Lanka
Pts: Juma 9		Pts: Yogananthan 13

Smithfield

31 July 2022
15:30

Report

Kenya	14–15	Scotland
Pts: Omondi 6		Pts: Murray 7

Smithfield

31 July 2022
15:30

Report

Canada	21–8	Sri Lanka
Pts: Gill 8		Pts: Yogananthan 6

Smithfield

=== Group B ===
Pos	Team	Pld	W	L	PF	PA	PD	Qualification
1	England (H)	3	3	0	59	28	+31	Direct to semi-finals
2	Australia	3	2	1	54	34	+20	Quarter-finals
3	New Zealand	3	1	2	42	54	−12	Quarter-finals
4	Trinidad and Tobago	3	0	3	24	63	−39	

Source: Birmingham 2022
Rules for classification: 1) Wins; 2) Head-to-head record; 3) Points scored.
(H) Hosts

30 July 2022
15:30

Report

Australia	21–6	Trinidad and Tobago
Pts: Johnson 11		Pts: Julien 3

Smithfield

30 July 2022
15:30

Report

New Zealand	10–21	England
Pts: Bezzant 4		Pts: Jackman 9

Smithfield

30 July 2022
19:30

Report

England	21–6	Trinidad and Tobago
Pts: Hesson 9		Pts: Joseph 3

Smithfield

30 July 2022
19:30

Report

Australia	21–11	New Zealand
Pts: Johnson 9		Pts: Bezzant 4

Smithfield

31 July 2022
19:30

Report

New Zealand	21–12	Trinidad and Tobago
Pts: Wynyard 8		Pts: Lewis 6

Smithfield

31 July 2022
19:30

Report

England	17–12	Australia
Pts: Hesson 8		Pts: Johnson 8

Smithfield

== Knockout stage ==
Quarter-finals
1 August
Australia	20
Kenya	15
1 August
Canada	21
New Zealand	18

Semi-finals
1 August
Scotland	15
Australia	20
1 August
England	13
Canada	12

Gold medal match
2 August
Australia	16
England	17
Bronze medal match
2 August
Scotland	12
Canada	13

=== Quarter-finals ===
1 August 2022
15:00

Report

Canada	21–18	New Zealand
Pts: Gill 8		Pts: Bezzant 14

Smithfield

1 August 2022
17:00

Report

Australia	20–15	Kenya
Pts: Wright 8		Pts: Omondi 6

Smithfield

=== Semi-finals ===
1 August 2022
19:30

Report

Scotland	15–20	Australia
Pts: Jimenez 11		Pts: Wagstaff 9

Smithfield

1 August 2022
22:00

Report

England	13–12	Canada
Pts: Hesson 6		Pts: Johnson 9

Smithfield

=== Bronze medal match ===
2 August 2022
15:00

Report

Scotland	12–13	Canada
Pts: Jimenez 7		Pts: Gill 5

Smithfield

=== Gold medal match ===
2 August 2022
19:30

Report

Australia	16–17	England
Pts: Johnson 7		Pts: Hesson 6

Smithfield

== Final ranking ==
Rank	Team
1st place, gold medalist(s)	England
2nd place, silver medalist(s)	Australia
3rd place, bronze medalist(s)	Canada
4	Scotland
5	Kenya
6	New Zealand
7	Sri Lanka
8	Trinidad and Tobago
