= Patrick Hussey =

Canadian swimmer (born 2001)

Personal information
- National team: Canada
- Born: March 1, 2001 (age 25) Montreal, Quebec, Canada

Sport
- Sport: Swimming
- Strokes: Butterfly
- College team: University of North Carolina
Medal record
Men's swimming
Representing Canada
Commonwealth Games
Silver medal – second place	2022 Birmingham	4×100 m mixed medley

Patrick Hussey (born March 1, 2001) is a Canadian competitive swimmer, primarily competing in the butterfly events.

== Career ==
In April 2022, Hussey was named to Canada's 2022 Commonwealth Games team. At the games, Hussey won a silver medal in the Mixed 4 x 100 metre medley relay.

At the conclusion of the 2024 Canadian Swim trials, Hussey was named to Canada's 2024 Olympics team.

== Personal life ==
Hussey attends University of North Carolina.
