= Taya Hanson =

Canadian basketball player

Personal information
- Born: June 14, 2000 (age 26) Kelowna, British Columbia, Canada
- Listed height: 5 ft 11 in (1.80 m)

Career information
- High school: Kelowna Secondary School
- College: Arizona State (2018–2022); Oregon (2022–2023)
- Position: Guard
- Number: 0
Medals
Women's basketball
Representing Canada
FIBA AmeriCup
Bronze medal – third place	2023 León
FIBA Americas U16 Championship
Gold medal – first place	2015 Mexico	Team
FIBA Americas U18 Championship
Silver medal – second place	2018 Mexico	Team
Women's 3x3 basketball
Representing Canada
Commonwealth Games
Gold medal – first place	2022 Birmingham	Team

Taya Hanson (born June 14, 2000) is a Canadian former basketball player who played college basketball for Arizona State and Oregon. She was also a member of the Canada women's national basketball team.

== College career ==
Hanson began her collegiate career at Arizona State. On January 1, 2021, she tied the ASU program record with seven three-pointers made in a game against California. She was subsequently named Canada Basketball’s Player of the Week for the week ending January 3, 2021. During the 2020–21 season in her junior year, she Led ASU in scoring (12.6), 3-pointers (62), steals (1.4) and free throw percentage (84.8), and ranked third in rebounding (4.3 rpg) and fourth in assists (1.4). She was subsequently named All-Pac-12 honorable mention and Pac-12 All-Defense honorable mention.

On March 29, 2022, Hanson announced she would enter the transfer portal. During her career at ASU she appeared in all 114 games while making 62 starts. She recorded 739 career points, 296 rebounds and 144 three-pointers made. On April 5, 2022, she announced she was transferring to Oregon for the 2022–23 season.

== National team career ==
Hanson has been a member of the Canada women's national basketball team since 2015. She first competed at the 2015 FIBA Americas U16 Championship and won a gold medal. She represented Canada at the 2018 FIBA Under-18 Women's Americas Championship where she averaged 11.5 points, 4.8 rebounds and 1.7 steals in six games and won a silver medal. On July 12, 2019, she was named to team Canada for the 2019 FIBA Under-19 Women's Basketball World Cup. She averaged 10.7 points in seven games.

On July 18, 2022, she was named to team Canada to compete at the 3x3 basketball tournament at the 2022 Commonwealth Games. She recorded 20 points and 23 rebounds in six games during the tournament and won a gold medal. On September 19, 2022, she was named to team Canada for the 2022 FIBA Women's Basketball World Cup.

=== College ===
Year	Team	GP	GS	MPG	FG%	3P%	FT%	RPG	APG	SPG	BPG	TO	PPG
2018–19	Arizona State	33	0	13.3	27.4	24.3	36.4	1.2	1.0	0.5	0.2	0.8	2.4
2019–20	Arizona State	31	12	20.8	30.2	29.0	78.9	1.9	0.8	0.6	0.1	0.9	4.6
2020–21	Arizona State	24	24	31.4	33.1	34.4	84.8	4.3	1.4	1.4	0.0	2.3	12.6
2021–22	Oregon	26	26	29.8	31.1	28.9	88.7	3.7	2.1	1.2	0.6	2.5	8.3
2022–23	Oregon	35	5	19.3	38.9	38.3	77.8	2.1	1.2	0.6	0.1	0.9	6.1
Career		149	67	22.1	32.7	31.9	81.0	2.5	1.3	0.8	0.2	1.4	6.4
Statistics gathered from Sports-Reference.
