= Tamara Steeves =

Canadian wheelchair basketball player

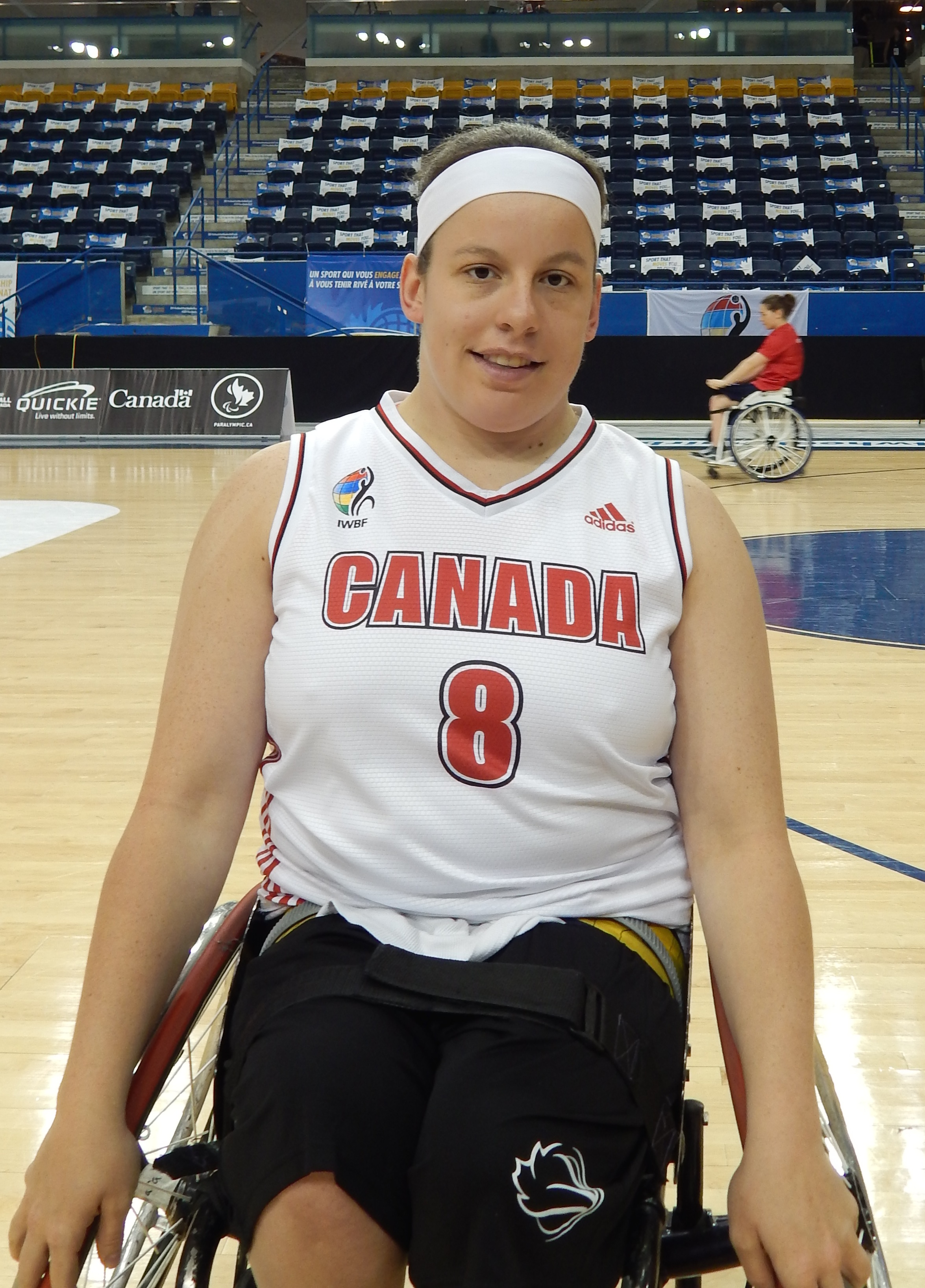
- Team Canada - No 8 - Tamara Steeves

Personal information
- Nationality: Canada
- Born: September 23, 1989 (age 36) Etobicoke, Ontario
- Height: 5 ft 2 in (1.57 m)

Sport
- Country: Canada
- Sport: Wheelchair basketball
- Disability class: 1.5
- Event: Women's team
Medal record
Women's wheelchair basketball
Representing Canada
World Championship
Gold medal – first place	2014 Toronto	Team
Silver medal – second place	2026 Ottawa	Team
Commonwealth Games
Gold medal – first place	2022 Birmingham	3x3
Parapan American Games
Gold medal – first place	2019 Lima	Team
Silver medal – second place	2023 Santiago	Team
Artland Open
Gold medal – first place	2009 Quakenbruck	Team
Osaka Cup
Bronze medal – third place	2011 Osaka	Team
Representing Ontario
Canada Games
Silver medal – second place	2011 Halifax	Team

Tamara Steeves (born September 23, 1989) is a Canadian 1.5 point wheelchair basketball player from Etobicoke, Ontario who won a gold medal in the 2009 Artland Open which was hosted in Quakenbruck, Germany and in 2011 bronze medal at Osaka Cup which was hosted in Osaka, Japan. She also won a silver medal at Canada Games in her home town Ontario the same year.

In 2013, she received the Queen Elizabeth II Diamond Jubilee Medal which was given to her by Minister of State Bal Gosal.

In 2016 she was chosen to represent Canada at the 2016 Summer Paralympics. She was also ranked as top athlete with a disability by the Mississauga Sports Council in 2012.
