= Smithfield, Birmingham =

Area in Birmingham, England, UK

Coordinates: 52.4759°N 1.8909°W

Smithfield was an inner-city area of Birmingham, England, southeast of the Bull Ring markets.

== Smithfield Market ==
The area was originally the site of the Birmingham Manor House in which the De Birmingham family had lived for centuries. The house had fallen into decay, a situation it had been in many times since the 16th century.

The manor house was purchased by the Birmingham Street Commissioners from Sir Thomas Gooch. The house was demolished and the moat filled in in 1816. Twelve feet of silt was removed from the moat. The establishment of a market in the area was made possible by the lack of density of the buildings and was described in 1848 as "a spacious area." It was built on the site of the ancient manor house moat.

The Smithfield Market was opened on Whitsun Fair Thursday, 29 May 1817 by the Birmingham Street Commissioners. The total cost of the development was £3,223 with the cost of construction being £2,449. A result of the opening of the market was the removal of farm animals from the streets and the increase in amount of space for retail trading. Due to the proximity to the markets, Smithfield also developed into a trading centre, establishing its own cattle and horse market which occasionally sold hay and straw on Michaelmas Day in 1817. An Act of Parliament passed in the same year forced the sheep and pig market, which had been held on New Street. The market was further extended in 1883 when a wholesale vegetable market opened on part of the Smithfield site. The pig market in Smithfield was moved to a new site on Montague Street in 1897 and the cattle market followed in 1898. The vegetable market took over the market by 1900, however, a weekly and bi-weekly second-hand market, known as the Rag Fair, was also held there from before 1912 until 1957. Smithfield market declined due to the increasing popularity in the dead meat market.

The market closed in the 1960s after being purchased by Birmingham City Council for the construction for the Inner Ring Road and the construction of new wholesale markets. The whole site was cleared in 1975. During the clearance work, several large sandstone blocks were removed which could have possibly formed the inner wall of the moat. In addition, other stonework was discovered but for reasons of time and money, no detailed excavations took place leading to the production of a floorplan. All recovered rocks were moved to Weoley Castle though nothing has been done to them since. The market gates, which had been made in the early twentieth century by the local foundry of Hart, Son, Peard and Co., were auctioned at Sotheby's on 25 May 1999, on behalf of an antique dealer who had had them in store for "years and years", and sold to an anonymous buyer for £11,000 (equivalent to £21,070 in 2025).

Smithfield Market had also been a popular public meeting area with a notable event at Christmas 1902, being the assembly of more than 5,000 children for the Birmingham Street Robins' winter treat. They proceeded to march to the Drill Hall in Thorpe Street, where they drank tea, ate cakes and received Christmas gifts of fruit, clothing, books and toys, provided by numerous charitable organisations and individuals; the presence of "a dozen coloured people and 80 Italian children" was noted in the press.

== Transport ==
Smithfield was also a tram terminus for the city. As congestion developed in Smithfield, it was decided that it should be moved to Station Street and in June 1885, work to do this commenced.

== The area at present ==
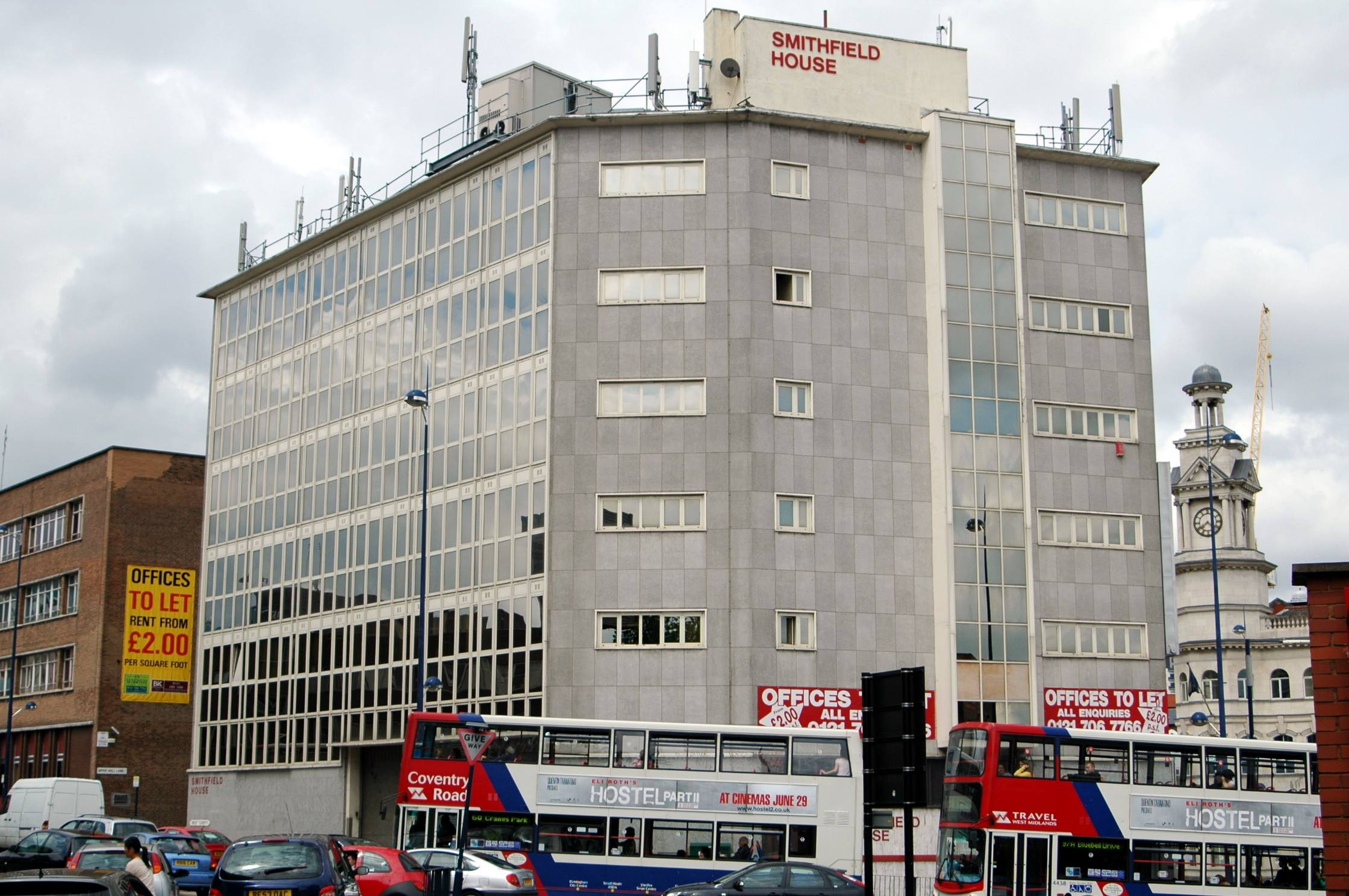
Smithfield House viewed from Moat Lane car park, the former site of the market and manor.

Today, the area has completely disappeared. Smithfield Markets expanded to become the Bull Ring Indoor Market was rebuilt and opened before the redevelopment of the Bullring Shopping Centre. Outdoor markets are held outside the entrance. The Bull Ring Rag Market was demolished as part of the development and a multi-storey car park was constructed. The markets adopted the name of the Bull Ring and lost the Smithfield name. The original site of the Smithfield market is now Moat Lane car park. Smithfield Street, which connected Bradford Street (then Moat Row) to Digbeth High Street was renamed Mill Lane.

There are very few reminders of the existence of Smithfield. Smithfield House, an office building with ground floor retail, once occupied by Reddingtons Rare Records, bounded by Upper Mill Lane, Moat Lane and Digbeth High Street is directly opposite the site of the old market. Inside the new multi-storey car park on Pershore Street is a walkway called Smithfield Passage.

The name of Moat Lane is a reference to the moat that once encircled the manor house on the site.

=== 2022 Commonwealth Games ===
For the 2022 Commonwealth Games, Smithfield hosted the 3X3 Basketball, Wheelchair Basketball and Beach Volleyball competitions, held within 2 bespoke arenas on the land.
