= Table tennis at the 2022 Commonwealth Games – Qualification =

Including the parasport events, there was a nominal total of 192 quota places available for table tennis at the 2022 Commonwealth Games; 96 each for men and women.

Such was the impact of the COVID-19 pandemic that key competitions (namely Regional Qualifiers and the 2021 Commonwealth Championships) did not take place. As a result, Commonwealth Sport (CGF) and the International Table Tennis Federation (ITTF) decided that where Olympic-style table tennis was concerned, qualification for the Commonwealth Games should primarily be determined by the most recent period in which the pandemic was not a factor in qualifying opportunities, i.e. 2019.

== Summary ==
NOC	Men				Women				Total
NOC	Singles	Team	Para C3–5	Para C8–10	Singles	Team	Para C3–5	Para C6–10	Total
Australia		4	1	1		4	2	2	14
Bangladesh		4			2				6
Barbados		4							4
Cameroon					1				1
Canada		4	1	1		4			10
Cyprus	1			1	1				3
England		4	2	1		4	1	1	13
Falkland Islands	1								1
Fiji		3				3	1		7
Ghana		4			2				6
Guyana		4				4			8
India		4	1			4	2	1	12
Jamaica	2				1				3
Jersey	1				1				2
Kenya	1				1				2
Malaysia		4		1		4		1	10
Maldives	1					4			5
Mauritius		4				4			8
Nigeria		4	2	2		4	2	1	15
Northern Ireland		4			1				5
Pakistan	1								1
Papua New Guinea	1				1				2
Saint Lucia	1								1
Saint Vincent and the Grenadines						4			4
Scotland	2				2				4
Seychelles	2				2				4
Sierra Leone			1						1
Singapore		4				4			8
Solomon Islands	1				1			1	3
South Africa		4				4			8
Trinidad and Tobago	1				2				3
Uganda						4			4
Vanuatu						3			3
Wales	1			1		4		1	7
Total: 34 CGAs	17	63	8	8	18	62	8	8	192

== Table tennis ==
There are 80 quota places per gender, of which 64 are distributed to 16 teams; the other 16 are awarded to individuals. Each Commonwealth Games Association (CGA) that qualifies a team of 4 players (or 3 if they so choose) may also enter 3 players per singles event and 2 pairs per doubles event (plus a third mixed doubles pair if they qualify a men's and women's team).

CGAs that qualify individuals (limit of 2 per gender) may enter 2 players per singles event and 1 pair per doubles event (plus a second mixed doubles pair if four individuals qualify).

=== Timeline ===
Event	Dates	Location
ITTF World Rankings	2 January 2019 – 1 January 2020	Various locations

=== Team qualification ===
- As the host CGA, England is guaranteed one place in the team event.
- The top eight CGAs on the ITTF World Team Rankings (as of 2 January 2020) earned one place each.
- One CGA from each of the six CGF regions received a CGF/ITTF Bipartite Invitation; determined in lieu of the abandoned Regional Qualifiers.
- The top-ranked CGA not already qualified was given the last place; determined in lieu of the abandoned 2021 Commonwealth Championships.

==== Men ====
Means of qualification	Team quotas	Qualified
Host Nation	1	England
ITTF World Team Rankings	8	India; Nigeria; Australia; Singapore; Canada; ~~New Zealand~~ (Note: Quota place declined and reallocated to next team in the rankings.); South Africa; Malaysia; Mauritius
Bipartite Invitation	6	Ghana; Guyana; Bangladesh; Barbados; Northern Ireland; Fiji
ITTF World Team Rankings (after invitations)	1	~~Vanuatu~~; ~~Sri Lanka~~; Cyprus
TOTAL	16	

==== Women ====
Means of qualification	Team quotas	Qualified
Host Nation	1	England
ITTF World Team Rankings	8	Singapore; India; Canada; Nigeria; Australia; Malaysia; South Africa; Mauritius
Bipartite Invitation	6	Uganda; Guyana; Maldives; Saint Vincent and the Grenadines; Wales; Fiji
ITTF World Team Rankings (after invitations)	1	Vanuatu
TOTAL	16	

=== Singles qualification ===
- Up to 48 quota places were nominally assigned to players belonging to CGAs already qualified (as above).
- Two players from each of the six CGF regions received a CGF/ITTF Bipartite Invitation; determined in lieu of the abandoned Regional Qualifiers.
- The top two players on the ITTF World Singles Rankings (as of 2 January 2020) earned one place each; determined in lieu of the abandoned 2021 Commonwealth Championships.
- A further two players received Bipartite Invitations.

==== Men ====
Means of qualification	Athlete quotas	Qualified
Qualified teams (up to 4 individuals per team)	47	England; India; Nigeria; Australia; Singapore; Canada; South Africa; Malaysia; Mauritius; Ghana; Guyana; Bangladesh; Barbados; Northern Ireland; Fiji; Sri Lanka
Qualified individuals only (including reallocations)	17	Mick Créa (SEY); Godfrey Sultan (SEY); Javier Sotomayor (FLK); Fahad Khawaja (PAK); Moosa Munsif Ahmed (MDV); Simon Tomlinson (JAM); Kane Watson (JAM); Callum Evans (WAL); Marios Yiangou (CYP); Geoffrey Loi (PNG); Gary Nuopula (SOL); Colin Dalgleish (SCO); D'Andre Calderon (LCA); Derron Douglas (TTO); Jordan Wykes (JEY); Brian Mutua (KEN); Gavin Rumgay (SCO)
TOTAL	64	

==== Women ====
Means of qualification	Athlete quotas	Qualified
Qualified teams (up to 4 individuals per team)	47	England; Singapore; India; Canada; Nigeria; Australia; Malaysia; South Africa; Mauritius; Uganda; Guyana; Maldives; Wales; Fiji; Vanuatu
Qualified individuals only (including reallocations)	18	Solesha Young (JAM); Christy Kilindo (SEY); Jenny Compell (KEN); Laura Sinon (SEY); Sadia Rahman Mou (BAN); Sonam Sultana (BAN); Lucy Elliott (SCO); Rebecca Plaistow (SCO); Foteini Meletie (CYP); Sophie Earley (NIR); Connie Sifi (SOL); Tammie Agari (PNG); Sarah Hanffou (CMR); Hannah Silcock (JEY); Rheann Chung (TTO); Millicent Ankude (GHA); Cynthia Kwabi (GHA); Catherine Spicer (TTO)
TOTAL	65	

=== Doubles qualification ===
Only those already qualified for team and/or singles events were eligible to enter doubles events (nominally 40 pairs in the men's and women's doubles, 64 pairs in the mixed doubles).

== Para table tennis ==
=== Timeline ===
Event	Dates	Location
ITTF Para Table Tennis Rankings List	1 January 2020 – 1 May 2022	Various locations

=== Rules ===
There are 32 quota places overall. Each Commonwealth Games Association (CGA) may qualify 2 players per event.

- Five places per event are determined by the ITTF Para Table Tennis Rankings List; one for the Americas/Caribbean regions combined, plus one for each of the other four CGF regions.
- Another place per event is determined by the aforementioned rankings directly.
- The last two places in each event are determined by CGF/ITTF Bipartite Invitations.

==== Men's singles C3–5 ====
Means of qualification	Date	Quotas	Qualified
ITTF Para Rankings (regional)	1 May 2022	5	Isau Ogunkunle (NGR); Muhammed Mudassar (CAN); Raj Aravindan (IND); Jack Hunter-Spivey (ENG); Chen Junjian (AUS)
ITTF Para Rankings (direct)	1 May 2022	1	Nasiru Sule (NGR)
Bipartite Invitation	6 May 2022	2	Daniel Bullen (ENG); George Wyndham (SLE)
TOTAL		8	

==== Men's singles C8–10 ====
Means of qualification	Date	Quotas	Qualified
ITTF Para Rankings (regional)	1 May 2022	5	Tajudeen Agunbiade (NGR); Asad Hussain Syed (CAN); Chee Chaoming (MAS); Ross Wilson (ENG); Ma Lin (AUS)
ITTF Para Rankings (direct)	1 May 2022	1	Joshua Stacey (WAL)
Bipartite Invitation	6 May 2022	2	Pantelis Kailis (CYP); Alabi Olabiyi Olufemi (NGR)
TOTAL		8	

==== Women's singles C3–5 ====
Means of qualification	Date	Quotas	Qualified
ITTF Para Rankings (regional)	1 May 2022	4	Ifechulwude Ikreoyi (NGR); Bhavina Patel (IND); Sue Bailey (ENG); Daniela Di Toro (AUS)
ITTF Para Rankings (direct)	1 May 2022	1	Chinenye Obiora (NGR)
Bipartite Invitation	6 May 2022	3	Akanisi Latu (FIJ); Amanda Tscharke (AUS); Sonalben Patel (IND)
TOTAL		8	

==== Women's singles C6–10 ====
Means of qualification	Date	Quotas	Qualified
ITTF Para Rankings (regional)	1 May 2022	4	Faith Obazuaye (NGR); Gloria Gracia Wong Sze (MAS); Felicity Pickard (ENG); Yang Qian (AUS)
ITTF Para Rankings (direct)	1 May 2022	1	Lei Lina (AUS)
Bipartite Invitation	6 May 2022	3	Grace Williams (WAL); Baby Sahana Ravi (IND); Noela Olo (SOL)
TOTAL		8	
