= Nigeria at the 2022 Commonwealth Games =

- Flag of Nigeria
- CG code: NGR
- CGA: Nigeria Olympic Committee
- Website: nigeriaolympic.org

in Birmingham, England 28 July 2022 – 8 August 2022
- Competitors: 92 (41 men and 51 women) in 7 sports
- Flag bearers: Nnamdi Chinecherem; Folashade Oluwafemiayo
- Medals Ranked 7th: Gold 12 Silver 8 Bronze 14 Total 34

Commonwealth Games appearances (overview)
- 1950; 1954; 1958; 1962; 1966; 1970; 1974; 1978; 1982; 1986; 1990; 1994; 1998; 2002; 2006; 2010; 2014; 2018; 2022; 2026; 2030

Nigeria competed at the 2022 Commonwealth Games held in Birmingham, England from 28 July to 8 August 2022. It was Nigeria's 15th appearance at the Commonwealth Games.

Nnamdi Chinecherem and Folashade Oluwafemiayo were the country's flagbearers during the opening ceremony.

== Medalists ==
Medal	Name	Sport	Event	Date
Gold	Adijat Olarinoye	Weightlifting	Women's -55 kg	30 July
Gold	Rafiatu Folashade Lawal	Weightlifting	Women's -59 kg	31 July
Gold	Chioma Onyekwere	Athletics	Women's discus throw	2 August
Gold	Goodness Nwachukwu	Athletics	Women's discus throw F44/64	4 August
Gold	Folashade Oluwafemiayo	Para Powerlifting	Women's heavyweight	4 August
Gold	Ikechukwu Obichukwu (Note: Sudhir initially won the gold medal in the event. However, he was later disqualified for doping violations, and Ikechukwu Obichukwu's silver was upgraded to gold.)	Para Powerlifting	Men's heavyweight	4 August
Gold	Odunayo Adekuoroye	Wrestling	Women's -57 kg	5 August
Gold	Blessing Oborududu	Wrestling	Women's -68 kg	5 August
Gold	Eucharia Iyiazi	Athletics	Women's shot put (F57)	6 August
Gold	Mercy Genesis	Wrestling	Women's -50 kg	6 August
Gold	Tobi Amusan	Athletics	Women's 100 m hurdles	7 August
Gold	Ese Brume	Athletics	Women's long jump	7 August
Silver	Taiwo Liadi	Weightlifting	Women's -76 kg	2 August
Silver	Bose Omolayo	Para Powerlifting	Women's heavyweight	4 August
Silver	Favour Ofili	Athletics	Women's 200 m	6 August
Silver	Nasiru Sule	Table tennis	Men's singles C3–5	6 August
Silver	Ifechukwude Ikpeoyi	Table tennis	Women's singles C3–5	6 August
Silver	Ebikewenimo Welson	Wrestling	Men's -57 kg	6 August
Silver	Hannah Rueben	Wrestling	Women's -76 kg	6 August
Silver	Elizabeth Oshoba	Boxing	Women's featherweight	7 August
Bronze	Edidiong Joseph Umoafia	Weightlifting	Men's -67 kg	31 July
Bronze	Islamiyat Yusuf	Weightlifting	Women's -64 kg	1 August
Bronze	Obiageri Amaechi	Athletics	Women's discus throw	2 August
Bronze	Mary Osijo	Weightlifting	Women's -87 kg	2 August
Bronze	Nnamdi Innocent	Para Powerlifting	Men's lightweight	4 August
Bronze	Esther Kolawole	Wrestling	Women's -62 kg	5 August
Bronze	Ugochi Alam	Athletics	Women's shot put (F57)	6 August
Bronze	Ifeanyi Onyekwere	Boxing	Men's super heavyweight	6 August
Bronze	Cynthia Ogunsemilore	Boxing	Women's lightweight	6 August
Bronze	Jacinta Umunnakwe	Boxing	Women's middleweight	6 August
Bronze	Isau Ogunkunle	Table tennis	Men's singles C3–5	6 August
Bronze	Faith Obazuaye	Table tennis	Women's singles C6–10	6 August
Bronze	Ogbonna John	Wrestling	Men's -74 kg	6 August
Bronze	Udodi Onwuzurike; Favour Ashe; Alaba Akintola; Raymond Ekevwo; Seye Ogunlewe	Athletics	Men's 4 × 100 m relay	7 August

== Competitors ==
The following is the list of number of competitors participating at the Games per sport/discipline.

Sport	Men	Women	Total
Athletics	17	20	37
Boxing	4	5	9
Judo	2	2	4
Para powerlifting	4	4	8
Table tennis	8	7	15
Weightlifting	2	7	9
Wrestling	4	6	10
Total	41	51	92

== Athletics ==
Men
Track and road events

Athlete	Event	Heat		Semifinal		Final	
Athlete	Event	Result	Rank	Result	Rank	Result	Rank
Favour Ashe	100 m	10.12	1 Q	10.24	3	did not advance	
Raymond Ekevwo	100 m	10.14	1 Q	10.36	7	did not advance	
Godson Oghenebrume	100 m	10.36	3 q	10.52	9	did not advance	
Suwaibidu Galadima	100 m (T47)	11.45	3 Q	—N/a		DSQ	
Alaba Akintola	200 m	21.28	3 q	21.16	5	did not advance	
Ifeanyi Emmanuel Ojeli	200 m	21.12	3 q	21.39	6	did not advance	
Udodi Onwuzurike	200 m	21.18	2 Q	20.59	1 Q	20.76	6
Sikiru Adeyemi	400 m	46.63	4 q	47.40	6	did not advance	
Dubem Amene	400 m	46.77	2 Q	DNF		did not advance	
Samson Nathaniel	400 m	46.31	2 Q	47.00	6	did not advance	
Ezekiel Nathaniel	400 m hurdles	50.38	2 Q	—N/a		51.38	6
Udodi Onwuzurike; Favour Ashe; Alaba Akintola; Raymond Ekevwo; Seye Ogunlewe	4 × 100 m relay	38.85	1 Q	—N/a		38.81	3rd place, bronze medalist(s)
Johnson Nnamani; Samson Nathaniel; Ifeanyi Emmanuel Ojeli; Sikiru Adeyemi; Ezekiel Nathaniel	4 × 400 m relay	3:06.36	4 q	—N/a		3:06.06	7

Field events

Athlete	Event	Final	
Athlete	Event	Distance	Rank
Mike Edwards	High jump	2.19	6
Chukwuebuka Enekwechi	Shot put	20.36	4
Kennedy Ezeji	Discus throw F44/64	38.76	6
Chinecherem Nnamdi	Javelin throw	76.46	9

Women
Track and road events

Athlete	Event	Heat		Semifinal		Final	
Athlete	Event	Result	Rank	Result	Rank	Result	Rank
Rosemary Chukwuma	100 m	11.02	1 Q	11.05	2 Q	11.17	4
Nzubechi Nwokocha	100 m	10.99	1 Q	11.06	2 Q	11.18	5
Joy Udo-Gabriel	100 m	11.43	3 Q	11.45	6	did not advance	
Nzubechi Nwokocha	200 m	25.34	7	did not advance			
Favour Ofili	200 m	22.71	1 Q	22.66	1 Q	22.51	2nd place, silver medalist(s)
Patience George	400 m	52.63	4 q	52.90	5	did not advance	
Patience Omovoh	400 m	54.40	5	did not advance			
Ella Onojuvwevwo	400 m	54.02	5	did not advance			
Tobi Amusan	100 m hurdles	12.40	1 Q	—N/a		12.30	1st place, gold medalist(s)
Tobi Amusan; Favour Ofili; Rosemary Chukwuma; Nzubechi Nwokocha; Joy Udo-Gabriel	4 × 100 m relay	42.57	1 Q	—N/a		DQ	DQ
Amarachukwu Obi; Ella Onojuvwevwo; Patience Omovoh; Patience George	4 × 400 m relay	—N/a				3:33.13	6

Field events

Athlete	Event	Qualification		Final	
Athlete	Event	Distance	Rank	Distance	Rank
Temitope Adeshina	High jump	1.81	1 q	1.81	10
Esther Isa	High jump	1.81	8 q	1.81	9
Ese Brume	Long jump	6.81	3 Q	7.00	1st place, gold medalist(s)
Ruth Usoro	Long jump	6.59	7 q	6.56	6
Ruth Usoro	Triple jump	—N/a		14.02	5
Orobosa Frank	Shot put	16.27	10 q	16.70	9
Ugochi Alam	Shot put (F57)	—N/a		9.30	3rd place, bronze medalist(s)
Eucharia Iyiazi	Shot put (F57)	—N/a		10.03	1st place, gold medalist(s)
Obiageri Amaechi	Discus throw	—N/a		56.99	3rd place, bronze medalist(s)
Chioma Onyekwere	Discus throw	—N/a		61.70	1st place, gold medalist(s)
Goodness Nwachukwu	Discus throw F44/64	—N/a		36.56	1st place, gold medalist(s)
Oyesade Olatoye	Hammer throw	61.74	9 q	66.80	4

== Boxing ==
Men

Athlete	Event	Round of 32	Round of 16	Quarterfinals	Semifinals	Final	
Athlete	Event	Opposition Result	Opposition Result	Opposition Result	Opposition Result	Opposition Result	Rank
Abdul-Afeez Osoba	Light middleweight	Hield (BAH); W KO	Croft (WAL); L 0 - 5	did not advance			
Adeyinka Benson	Middleweight	Bye	Quartey (GHA); W 3 - 2	Hickey (SCO); L RSC	did not advance		
Innocent Ehwarieme	Light heavyweight	Bye	Bowen (ENG); L 0 - 5	did not advance			
Ifeanyi Onyekwere	Super heavyweight	—N/a	Bye	Feujio (CAN); W 5 - 0	Ahlawat (IND); L 0 - 5	Did not advance	3rd place, bronze medalist(s)

Women

Athlete	Event	Round of 16	Quarterfinals	Semifinals	Final	
Athlete	Event	Opposition Result	Opposition Result	Opposition Result	Opposition Result	Rank
Yetunde Egunjobi	Light flyweight	Bye	Stubley (ENG); L 0 - 5	did not advance		
Elizabeth Oshoba	Featherweight	Walsh (NZL); W 5 - 0	Guy (TTO); W 3 - 2	Rahimi (AUS); W 4 - 1	Walsh (NIR); L 0 - 5	2nd place, silver medalist(s)
Cynthia Ogunsemilore	Lightweight	Bye	Kasemang (BOT); W RSC	Broadhurst (NIR); L 0 - 5	Did not advance	3rd place, bronze medalist(s)
Bolanle Shogbamu	Light middleweight	Wilkinson (ENG); L 1 - 4	did not advance			
Jacinta Umunnakwe	Middleweight	Bye	Ula (TGA); W WO	Gramane (MOZ); L 0 - 5	Did not advance	3rd place, bronze medalist(s)

== Judo ==
A squad of two judoka was entered as of 8 July 2022.

Athlete	Event	Round of 16	Quarterfinals	Semifinals	Repechage	Final/BM	
Athlete	Event	Opposition Result	Opposition Result	Opposition Result	Opposition Result	Opposition Result	Rank
Patrick Edwin	Men's -66 kg	Burns (NIR); L 00 - 10	did not advance				9
Fatai Muritala	Men's -81 kg	Moorhead (ENG); L 00 - 10	did not advance				9
Cecilia James	Women's -63 kg	Soko (ZAM); W 10 - 00	Haecker (AUS); L 00 - 10	Did not advance	H-Jones (WAL); L 00 - 10	Did not advance	7
Joy Asonye	Women's -70 kg	—N/a	Coughlan (AUS); L 00 - 10	Did not advance	Takayawa (FIJ); W 10 - 00	P-Pollard (ENG); L 00 - 10	5

== Para powerlifting ==
Athlete	Event	Result	Rank					
Thomas Kure	Men's lightweight	132.5	4					
Nnamdi Innocent	Men's lightweight	132.5	3rd place, bronze medalist(s)					
Abdulazeez Ibrahim	Men's heavyweight	No mark						
Ikechukwu Obichukwu	Men's heavyweight	Gold	Ikechukwu Obichukwu	Para Powerlifting	Men's heavyweight	4 August	133.6	1st place, gold medalist(s)
Onyinyechi Mark	Women's lightweight	DSQ						
Latifat Tijani	Women's lightweight	DSQ						
Folashade Oluwafemiayo	Women's heavyweight	123.4	1st place, gold medalist(s)					
Bose Omolayo	Women's heavyweight	115.2	2nd place, silver medalist(s)					

== Table tennis ==
Nigeria qualified for both team events via the ITTF World Team Rankings (as of 2 January 2020). Eight players were selected on 8 July 2022.

Singles

Athletes	Event	Group stage				Round of 32	Round of 16	Quarterfinal	Semifinal	Final / BM	
Athletes	Event	Opposition Score	Opposition Score	Opposition Score	Rank	Opposition Score	Opposition Score	Opposition Score	Opposition Score	Opposition Score	Rank
Bode Abiodun	Men's singles	Bye				Dalgleish (SCO); W 4 - 2	Shetty (IND); L 2 - 4	did not advance			
Quadri Aruna	Men's singles	Bye				Bye	Rumgay (SCO); W 4 - 0	Drinkhall (ENG); L 1 - 4	did not advance		
Olajide Omotayo	Men's singles	Bye				Leong (MAS); W 4 - 3	Kamal (IND); L 2 - 4	did not advance			
Isau Ogunkunle	Men's singles C3–5	Bullen (ENG); W 3 - 0	Alagar (IND); W 3 - 1	Wyndham (SLE); W 3 - 0	1 Q	—N/a			H-Spivey (ENG); L 0 - 3	Alagar (IND); W 3 - 0	3rd place, bronze medalist(s)
Nasiru Sule	Men's singles C3–5	Mudassar (CAN); W 3 - 0	H-Spivey (ENG); W 3 - 2	Chen (AUS); W 3 - 0	1 Q	—N/a			Alagar (IND); W 3 - 1	H-Spivey (ENG); L 1 - 3	2nd place, silver medalist(s)
Tajudeen Agunbiade	Men's singles C8–10	Kailis (CYP); W 3 - 0	Stacey (CYP); L 1 - 3	Chee (MAS); W 3 - 1	2 Q	—N/a			Ma (AUS); L 0 - 3	Wilson (ENG); L 2 - 3	4
Alabi Olufemi	Men's singles C8–10	Wilson (ENG); L WO	Syed (CAN); L WO	Ma (AUS); L WO	4	—N/a			did not advance		
Fatima Bello	Women's singles	Bye				Hursey (WAL); L 0 - 4	did not advance				
Offiong Edem	Women's singles	Bye				Edghill (GUY); W 4 - 2	Lay (AUS); L 1 - 4	did not advance			
Esther Oribamise	Women's singles	Abel (VAN); W 4 - 0	Mou (BAN); W 4 - 0	—N/a	1 Q	Carey (WAL); L 2 - 4	did not advance				
Ifechukwude Ikpeoyi	Women's singles C3–5	Latu (FIJ); W 3 - 0	Patel (IND); L 0 - 3	di Toro (AUS); W 3 - 1	2 Q	—N/a			Patel (IND); W 3 - 1	Patel (IND); L 0 - 3	2nd place, silver medalist(s)
Chinenye Obiora	Women's singles C3–5	Tscharke (AUS); W 3 - 0	Bailey (ENG); L 2 - 3	Patel (IND); L 1 - 3	3	—N/a			did not advance		
Faith Obazuaye	Women's singles C6–10	Ravi (IND); W 3 - 0	Yang (AUS); L 1 - 3	Wong (MAS); W 3 - 0	2 Q	—N/a			Lei (AUS); L 0 - 3	Pickard (ENG); W 3 - 1	3rd place, bronze medalist(s)

Doubles

Athletes	Event	Round of 64	Round of 32	Round of 16	Quarterfinal	Semifinal	Final / BM	
Athletes	Event	Opposition Score	Opposition Score	Opposition Score	Opposition Score	Opposition Score	Opposition Score	Rank
Olajide Omotayo; Amadi Omeh	Men's doubles	Bye	Hamza / Sabbir (BAN); W 3 – 0	Britton / Franklin (GUY); W 3 – 1	Pitchford / Drinkhall (ENG); L 0 – 3	did not advance		
Quadri Aruna; Bode Abiodun	Men's doubles	Bye	Yiangou / Elia (CYP); W 3 – 0	Koen / Quek (SGP); W 3 – 2	Lum / Liu (AUS); L 2 – 3	did not advance		
Esther Oribamise; Ajoke Ojomu	Women's doubles	Bye	Feng / Zeng (SGP); L 0 – 3	did not advance				
Offiong Edem; Fatima Bello	Women's doubles	Bye	Greaves / Thomas (GUY); W 3 – 0	Edwards / Kalam (RSA); W 3 – 0	Jee / Lay (AUS); L 0 – 3	did not advance		
Olajide Omotayo; Ajoke Ojomu	Mixed doubles	Bye	Yogarajah / Jalim (MRI); W 3 – 0	Gnanasekaran / Batra (IND); L 0 – 3	did not advance			
Bode Abiodun; Fatima Bello	Mixed doubles	Bye	Commey / Ankude (GHA); W 3 – 0	Luu / Liu (AUS); L 0 – 3	did not advance			
Offiong Edem; Quadri Aruna	Mixed doubles	Bye	Abrefa / Kwabi (GHA); L WO	did not advance				

Team

Athletes	Event	Group stage				Quarterfinal	Semifinal	Final / BM	
Athletes	Event	Opposition Score	Opposition Score	Opposition Score	Rank	Opposition Score	Opposition Score	Opposition Score	Rank
Quadri Aruna; Olajide Omotayo; Bode Abiodun; Amadi Omeh	Men's team	South Africa; W 3―0	Ghana; W 3―0	Cyprus; W 3―0	1 Q	Malaysia; W 3―2	India; L 0―3	England; L 0―3	4
Fatima Bello; Offiong Edem; Esther Oribamise; Ajoke Ojomu	Women's team	Saint Vincent and the Grenadines; W 3―0	Singapore; L 0―3	England; L 2―3	3	did not advance			

== Weightlifting ==
As of 16 March 2022, nine weightlifters (two men, seven women) qualified for the competition.

Stella Kingsley, Adijat Olarinoye, Rafiatu Folashade Lawal and Joy Ogbonne Eze qualified by winning gold at the 2021 Commonwealth Weightlifting Championships in Tashkent, Uzbekistan. The other five qualified via the IWF Commonwealth Ranking List, which was finalised on 9 March 2022.

Men

Athlete	Event	Snatch		Clean & Jerk		Total	Rank
Athlete	Event	Result	Rank	Result	Rank	Total	Rank
Emmanuel Appah	61 kg	110	5	135	5	245	5
Edidiong Joseph Umoafia	67 kg	130	2	160	3	290	3rd place, bronze medalist(s)

Women

Athlete	Event	Snatch		Clean & Jerk		Total	Rank
Athlete	Event	Result	Rank	Result	Rank	Total	Rank
Stella Kingsley	49 kg	75	3	95	5	170	4
Adijat Olarinoye	55 kg	92 GR	1	111	2	203 GR	1st place, gold medalist(s)
Rafiatu Folashade Lawal	59 kg	90 GR	1	116 GR	1	206 GR	1st place, gold medalist(s)
Islamiyat Yusuf	64 kg	93	3	119	3	212	3rd place, bronze medalist(s)
Joy Ogbonne Eze	71 kg	100	2	—	—	—	DNF
Taiwo Liadi	76 kg	96	2	120	2	216	2nd place, silver medalist(s)
Mary Osijo	87 kg	102	3	123	3	225	3rd place, bronze medalist(s)

== Wrestling ==
Key:

- VT - Victory by Fall.
- PP - Decision by Points - the loser with technical points.
- PO - Decision by Points - the loser without technical points.

Repechage Format

Athlete	Event	Round of 16	Quarterfinal	Semifinal	Repechage	Final / BM	
Athlete	Event	Opposition Result	Opposition Result	Opposition Result	Opposition Result	Opposition Result	Rank
Ebikewenimo Welson	Men's -57 kg	Bye	Tau (RSA); W 10 - 0	Capellam (CAN); W 8 - 4	—N/a	Dahiya (IND); L 0 - 10	2nd place, silver medalist(s)
Amas Daniel	Men's -65 kg	Vella (MLT); W 10 - 0	Ullah (PAK); L 0 - 4	did not advance			
Ogbonna John	Men's -74 kg	Malik (IND); L 3 - 13	did not advance		Hong (SGP); W 10 - 0	Bowling (ENG); W 10 - 0	3rd place, bronze medalist(s)
Ekerekeme Agiomor	Men's -86 kg	Moore (CAN); L 0 - 10	did not advance				
Odunayo Adekuoroye	Women's -57 kg	Ayo (UGA); W 2 - 0	Ayieta (KEN); W 10 - 0	Taylor (CAN); W 10 - 0	—N/a	Malik (IND); W 7 - 3	1st place, gold medalist(s)
Esther Kolawole	Women's -62 kg	—N/a	Weraduwage (SRI); W 10 - 0	Godinez (CAN); L 4 - 10	—N/a	Fountain (SCO); W 10 - 0	3rd place, bronze medalist(s)
Blessing Oborududu	Women's -68 kg	Ngiri (CMR); W 10 - 0	Kakran (IND); W 11 - 0	Lemalie (TGA); W 10 - 0	—N/a	Morais (CAN); W 5 - 1	1st place, gold medalist(s)
Hannah Rueben	Women's -76 kg	—N/a	Koroma (SLE); W 10 - 0	Nelthrope (ENG); W 6 - 1	—N/a	Di Stasio (CAN); L 2 - 4	2nd place, silver medalist(s)

Group Stage Format

Athlete	Event	Group Stage			Semifinal	Final / BM	
Athlete	Event	Opposition Result	Opposition Result	Rank	Opposition Result	Opposition Result	Rank
Mercy Genesis	Women's -50 kg	Parks (CAN); W 9 - 0	Pedige (SRI); W 12 - 1	1 Q	Letchidjio (SCO); W 10 - 0	Parks (CAN); W 3 - 1	1st place, gold medalist(s)

Nordic Format

Athlete	Event	Nordic Round Robin			Rank
Athlete	Event	Opposition Result	Opposition Result	Opposition Result	Rank
Mercy Adekuoroye	Women's -53 kg	Don (SRI); W 10 - 0	Phogat (IND); L 0 - 6	Stewart (CAN); L 5 - 6	3 (Note: Due to only 4 athletes competing, no bronze medal was awarded.)

== See also ==
- Nigeria at the 2022 Winter Olympics
