= India at the 2022 Commonwealth Games =

- Flag of India
- CG code: IND
- CGA: Indian Olympic Association
- Website: olympic.ind.in

in Birmingham, England 28 July 2022 – 8 August 2022
- Competitors: 210 (106 men and 104 women) in 16 sports
- Flag bearers (opening): Manpreet Singh; P. V. Sindhu
- Flag bearers (closing): Nikhat Zareen; Sharath Kamal
- Officials: 24
- Medals Ranked 4th: Gold 21 Silver 16 Bronze 23 Total 60

Commonwealth Games appearances (overview)
- 1934; 1938; 1950; 1954; 1958; 1962; 1966; 1970; 1974; 1978; 1982; 1986; 1990; 1994; 1998; 2002; 2006; 2010; 2014; 2018; 2022; 2026; 2030

India competed at the 2022 Commonwealth Games at Birmingham, England from 28 July to 8 August 2022. It was the country's 18th appearance at the Commonwealth Games.

The Indian contingent consisted of 210 athletes competing in 16 sports. Field hockey player Manpreet Singh and badminton athlete P. V. Sindhu served as the country's flagbearers during the opening ceremony. Boxer Nikhat Zareen and paddler Sharath Kamal served as the flagbearers during the closing ceremony.

Indian won 60 medals including 21 gold, 16 silver, and 23 bronze medals, and was ranked fourth in the overall medall table. Sharath Kamal was the most successful athlete, winning three gold and a silver medal in table tennis.

== Background ==
Following a decision by the executive board of the Commonwealth Games Federation (CGF) in June 2019 to back the Birmingham Organising Committee for the 2022 Commonwealth Games's proposal to exclude archery and shooting from the 2022 Commonwealth Games, Indian Olympic Association (IOA) President Narinder Batra proposed that India boycott the 2022 Games, claiming the CGF leadership had an "India bashing mindset" and that "people with a particular mindset" could not tolerate India's sporting prowess (as India had performed historically well in these sports).

The IOA later withdrew its boycott threat, and proposed hosting the archery and shooting events separately in Chandigarh in January 2022. The proposal was backed by the CGF on condition that India shall bear the entire cost of hosting the event, and the medals awarded in these events would be included in the overall medal table a week after the closing ceremony of the 2022 Games. However, the plan was scrapped due to the COVID-19 pandemic.

In October 2021, Hockey India withdrew the Indian men's and women's hockey teams from the Games, citing the risk of COVID-19 in the United Kingdom and the proximity of the 2022 Commonwealth Games to the 2022 Asian Games (which also served as the qualifiers for 2024 Summer Olympics). The decision was made in response to the UK's non-recognition of Indian COVID-19 vaccination certificates and England Hockey withdrawing from the 2021 Men's FIH Hockey Junior World Cup in Bhubaneswar. However, following discussions with the IOA and Sports Minister Anurag Thakur, the federation announced that India would, subject to qualification, participate in the Commonwealth hockey tournaments.

The 2022 Commonwealth Games is the 21st edition of the Commonwealth Games and was held in Birmingham, England, from 28 July to 8 August 2022. India made its Commonwealth Games debut at the 1934 edition, (Note: Prior to its independence in 1947, India competed as British India in the 1934 and 1938 editions.) and the 2026 Games marked the country's 18th appearance at the Commonwealth Games. Field hockey player Manpreet Singh and badminton athlete P. V. Sindhu served as the country's opening ceremony flagbearers. Boxer Nikhat Zareen and paddler Sharath Kamal served as the flagbearers during the closing ceremony.

== Competitors ==
In July 2022, IOA named an Indian contingent consisting of 210 athletes competing across 16 sports. The final Indian contingent consisted of 106 men and 104 women. Fourteen year old squash player Anahat Singh became the youngest Indian athlete to compete at the Commonwealth Games.

Sport	Men	Women	Total
Athletics	20	17	37
Badminton	5	5	10
Boxing	8	4	12
Cricket	—N/a	15	15
Cycling	9	4	13
Gymnastics	3	4	7
Hockey	18	18	36
Judo	3	3	6
Lawn bowls	5	5	10
Para powerlifting	2	2	4
Squash	5	4	9
Swimming	7	0	7
Table tennis	5	7	12
Triathlon	2	2	4
Weightlifting	8	7	15
Wrestling	6	6	12
Total	106	102	208

== Medals ==
=== Medals by sport ===
Medals by sport
Sport	Gold	Silver	Bronze	Total
Athletics	1	4	3	8
Badminton	3	1	2	6
Boxing	3	1	3	7
Cricket	0	1	0	1
Hockey	0	1	1	2
Judo	0	2	1	3
Lawn bowls	1	1	0	2
Squash	0	0	2	2
Table tennis	4	1	2	7
Weightlifting	3	3	4	10
Wrestling	6	1	5	12
Total	21	16	23	60

=== Medals by day ===
Medals by day
Day	Date	Gold	Silver	Bronze	Total
1	29 July	0	0	0	0
2	30 July	1	2	1	4
3	31 July	2	0	0	2
4	1 August	0	1	2	3
5	2 August	2	2	0	4
6	3 August	0	1	4	5
7	4 August	0	1	0	1
8	5 August	3	1	2	6
9	6 August	4	3	7	14
10	7 August	5	4	6	15
11	8 August	4	1	1	6
	Total	21	16	23	60

=== Medals by gender ===
Medals by gender
Gender	Gold	Silver	Bronze	Total
Male	12	9	13	35
Female	8	6	9	23
Mixed/Open	1	1	1	3
Total	21	16	23	60

== Medalists ==
Medal	Name	Sport	Event	Date
Gold	Saikhom Mirabai Chanu	Weightlifting	Women's 49 kg	30 July
Gold	Jeremy Lalrinnunga	Weightlifting	Men's 67 kg	31 July
Gold	Achinta Sheuli	Weightlifting	Men's 73 kg	31 July
Gold	Rupa Rani Tirkey; Nayanmoni Saikia; Lovely Choubey; Pinki Singh	Lawn bowls	Women's fours	2 August
Gold	Harmeet Desai; Sanil Shetty; Sharath Achanta; Sathiyan Gnanasekaran	Table tennis	Men's team	2 August
Gold	Bajrang Punia	Wrestling	Men's freestyle 65 kg	5 August
Gold	Sakshi Malik	Wrestling	Women's freestyle 62 kg	5 August
Gold	Deepak Punia	Wrestling	Men's freestyle 86 kg	5 August
Gold	Ravi Kumar Dahiya	Wrestling	Men's freestyle 57 kg	6 August
Gold	Vinesh Phogat	Wrestling	Women's freestyle 53 kg	6 August
Gold	Naveen Malik	Wrestling	Men's freestyle 74 kg	6 August
Gold	Bhavina Patel	Table tennis	Women's singles C3–5	6 August
Gold	Nitu Ghanghas	Boxing	Women's 48 kg	7 August
Gold	Amit Panghal	Boxing	Men's 51 kg	7 August
Gold	Eldhose Paul	Athletics	Men's triple jump	7 August
Gold	Nikhat Zareen	Boxing	Women's 50 kg	7 August
Gold	Sharath Achanta; Sreeja Akula	Table tennis	Mixed doubles	7 August
Gold	P. V. Sindhu	Badminton	Women's singles	8 August
Gold	Lakshya Sen	Badminton	Men’s singles	8 August
Gold	Chirag Shetty; Satwiksairaj Rankireddy	Badminton	Men’s doubles	8 August
Gold	Sharath Achanta	Table tennis	Men's singles	8 August
Silver	Sanket Sargar	Weightlifting	Men's 55 kg	30 July
Silver	Bindyarani Devi	Weightlifting	Women's 55 kg	30 July
Silver	Shushila Likmabam	Judo	Women's 48 kg	1 August
Silver	Vikas Thakur	Weightlifting	Men's 96 kg	2 August
Silver	India badminton team: Srikanth Kidambi; Satwiksairaj Rankireddy; B. Sumeeth Reddy; Lakshya Sen; Chirag Shetty; Gayathri Gopichand; Treesa Jolly; Aakarshi Kashyap; Ashwini Ponnappa; P. V. Sindhu	Badminton	Mixed team	2 August
Silver	Tulika Maan	Judo	Women's +78 kg	3 August
Silver	Murali Sreeshankar	Athletics	Men's long jump	4 August
Silver	Anshu Malik	Wrestling	Women's freestyle 57 kg	5 August
Silver	Priyanka Goswami	Athletics	Women's 10,000 m walk	6 August
Silver	Avinash Sable	Athletics	Men's 3000 m steeplechase	6 August
Silver	Sunil Bahadur; Navneet Singh; Chandan Singh; Dinesh Kumar	Lawn bowls	Men's fours	6 August
Silver	Abdulla Aboobacker	Athletics	Men's triple jump	7 August
Silver	Sathiyan Gnanasekaran; Sharath Achanta	Table tennis	Men's doubles	7 August
Silver	India women's cricket team: Harmanpreet Kaur; Smriti Mandhana; Taniya Bhatia; Yastika Bhatia; Harleen Deol; Rajeshwari Gayakwad; Sabbhineni Meghana; Sneh Rana; Jemimah Rodrigues; Deepti Sharma; Meghna Singh; Renuka Singh; Pooja Vastrakar; Shafali Verma; Radha Yadav	Cricket	Women's cricket	7 August
Silver	Sagar Ahlawat	Boxing	Men's +92 kg	7 August
Silver	India men's hockey team: P. R. Sreejesh; Krishan Pathak; Varun Kumar; Surender Kumar; Harmanpreet Singh; Amit Rohidas; Jugraj Singh; Jarmanpreet Singh; Manpreet Singh; Hardik Singh; Vivek Prasad; Shamsher Singh; Akashdeep Singh; Nilakanta Sharma; Mandeep Singh; Gurjant Singh; Lalit Upadhyay; Abhishek	Hockey	Men's tournament	8 August
Bronze	Gururaja Poojary	Weightlifting	Men's 61 kg	30 July
Bronze	Vijay Kumar Yadav	Judo	Men's 60 kg	1 August
Bronze	Harjinder Kaur	Weightlifting	Women's 71 kg	1 August
Bronze	Lovepreet Singh	Weightlifting	Men's 109 kg	3 August
Bronze	Saurav Ghosal	Squash	Men's singles	3 August
Bronze	Gurdeep Singh	Weightlifting	Men's +109 kg	3 August
Bronze	Tejaswin Shankar	Athletics	Men's high jump	3 August
Bronze	Divya Kakran	Wrestling	Women's freestyle 68 kg	5 August
Bronze	Mohit Grewal	Wrestling	Men's freestyle 125 kg	5 August
Bronze	Jaismine Lamboria	Boxing	Women's lightweight	6 August
Bronze	Pooja Gehlot	Wrestling	Women's freestyle 50 kg	6 August
Bronze	Pooja Sihag	Wrestling	Women's freestyle 76 kg	6 August
Bronze	Mohammad Hussamuddin	Boxing	Men's featherweight	6 August
Bronze	Deepak Nehra	Wrestling	Men's freestyle 97 kg	6 August
Bronze	Sonalben Patel	Table tennis	Women's singles C3–5	6 August
Bronze	Rohit Tokas	Boxing	Men's welterweight	6 August
Bronze	India women's hockey team: Savita Punia; Rajani Etimarpu; Deep Grace Ekka; Gurjit Kaur; Nikki Pradhan; Udita Duhan; Nisha Warsi; Sushila Chanu; Monika Malik; Neha Goyal; Jyoti; Sonika Tandi; Salima Tete; Vandana Katariya; Lalremsiami; Navneet Kaur; Sharmila Devi; Sangita Kumari	Hockey	Women's tournament	7 August
Bronze	Sandeep Kumar	Athletics	Men's 10,000 m walk	7 August
Bronze	Annu Rani	Athletics	Women's javelin throw	7 August
Bronze	Saurav Ghosal; Dipika Pallikal	Squash	Mixed doubles	7 August
Bronze	Srikanth Kidambi	Badminton	Men's singles	7 August
Bronze	Gayathri Gopichand; Treesa Jolly	Badminton	Women's doubles	7 August
Bronze	Sathiyan Gnanasekaran	Table tennis	Men's singles	8 August

== Athletics ==
Following the National Inter-State Athletics Championships in Chennai, a squad of thirty-seven athletes was selected on 16 June 2022.

Key

- Q = Qualified for the next round
- q = Qualified for the next round as a fastest loser or, in field events, by position without achieving the qualifying target

Men
Track & road events

Athlete	Event	Heat		Final	
Athlete	Event	Result	Rank	Result	Rank
Avinash Sable	5000 m	—N/a		DNF	
Avinash Sable	3000 m steeplechase	—N/a		8:11.20 NR	2nd place, silver medalist(s)
Noah Nirmal Tom; Amoj Jacob; Naganathan Pandi; Muhammed Anas; Muhammed Ajmal Variyathodi	4 × 400 m relay	3:06.97	2 Q	3:05.51	7
Nitendra Singh Rawat	Marathon	—N/a		2:19:22	12
Sandeep Kumar	10,000 m walk	—N/a		38:49.21 PB	3rd place, bronze medalist(s)
Amit Khatri	10,000 m walk	—N/a		43:04.97 SB	9

Field events

Athlete	Event	Qualification		Final	
Athlete	Event	Distance	Rank	Distance	Rank
Tejaswin Shankar	High jump	—N/a		2.22	3rd place, bronze medalist(s)
Muhammed Anees	Long jump	7.68	8 q	7.97	5
Murali Sreeshankar	Long jump	8.05	1 Q	8.08	2nd place, silver medalist(s)
Abdulla Aboobacker	Triple jump	—N/a		17.02	2nd place, silver medalist(s)
Eldhose Paul	Triple jump	—N/a		17.03	1st place, gold medalist(s)
Praveen Chithravel	Triple jump	—N/a		16.89	4
Devendra Gahlot	Discus throw F44/64	—N/a		42.13	5
Devender Kumar	Discus throw F44/64	—N/a		46.28	7
Aneesh Pillai	Discus throw F44/64	—N/a		DNS	
D. P. Manu	Javelin throw	—N/a		82.28	5
Rohit Yadav	Javelin throw	—N/a		82.22	6

Women
Track & road events

Athlete	Event	Heat		Semifinal		Final	
Athlete	Event	Result	Rank	Result	Rank	Result	Rank
Dutee Chand	100 m	11.55	4	Did not advance			
Hima Das	200 m	23.42	1 Q	23.42	3	Did not advance	
Jyothi Yarraji	100 m hurdles	13.18	4	—N/a		Did not advance	
Dutee Chand; Hima Das; Srabani Nanda; Jyothi Yarraji	4 × 100 m relay	44.45	2 Q	—N/a		43.81	5
Bhawna Jat	10,000 m walk	—N/a				47:14.13 PB	8
Priyanka Goswami	10,000 m walk	—N/a				43:38.83 PB	2nd place, silver medalist(s)

Field events

Athlete	Event	Qualification		Final	
Athlete	Event	Distance	Rank	Distance	Rank
Ancy Sojan	Long jump	6.25	13	Did not advance	
Manpreet Kaur	Shot put	16.78	7 q	15.59	12
Poonam Sharma	Shot put (F57)	—N/a		7.07 PB/GR	7
Santosh	Shot put (F57)	—N/a		6.53	8
Sharmila	Shot put (F57)	—N/a		8.43 PB	4
Navjeet Dhillon	Discus throw	—N/a		53.51	8
Seema Punia	Discus throw	—N/a		55.92	5
Manju Bala	Hammer throw	59.68	11 q	60.96	12
Sarita Singh	Hammer throw	57.48	13	Did not advance	
Annu Rani	Javelin throw	—N/a		60.00	3rd place, bronze medalist(s)
Shilpa Rani	Javelin throw	—N/a		54.62	7

== Badminton ==
By virtue of its position in the combined BWF World Ranking (as of 1 February 2022), India qualified for the mixed team event. Following the Senior Selection Trials, a full squad of ten players was selected on 20 April 2022.

Singles

Athlete	Event	Round of 64	Round of 32	Round of 16	Quarterfinal	Semifinal	Final / BM	
Athlete	Event	Opposition Score	Opposition Score	Opposition Score	Opposition Score	Opposition Score	Opposition Score	Rank
Lakshya Sen	Men's singles	Bye	Smeed (SHN); W (21–4, 21–5)	Lin Y X (AUS); W (21–9, 21–16)	Paul (MRI); W (21–12, 21–11)	Teh (SGP); W (21–10, 18–21, 21–16)	Ng T Y (MAS); W (19–21, 21–9, 21–16)	1st place, gold medalist(s)
Srikanth Kidambi	Men's singles	Bye	Wanagaliya (UGA); W (21–9, 21–9)	Abeywickrama (SRI); W (21–9, 21–12)	Penty (ENG); W (21–19, 21–17)	Ng T Y (MAS); L (21–13, 19–21, 10–21)	Teh (SGP); W (21–9, 21–18)	3rd place, bronze medalist(s)
P. V. Sindhu	Women's singles	Bye	Abdul Razzaq (MDV); W (21–4, 21–11)	Kobugabe (UGA); W (21–10, 21–9)	Goh J W (MAS); W (19–21, 21–14, 21–18)	Yeo J M (SGP); W (21–19, 21–17)	Li (CAN); W (21–15, 21–13)	1st place, gold medalist(s)
Aakarshi Kashyap	Women's singles	Bye	Shahzad (PAK); W (22–20, 8–1 ret.)	Kattirtzi (CYP); W (21–2, 21–7)	Gilmour (SCO); L (10–21, 7–21)	Did not advance		

Doubles

Athlete	Event	Round of 64	Round of 32	Round of 16	Quarterfinal	Semifinal	Final / BM	
Athlete	Event	Opposition Score	Opposition Score	Opposition Score	Opposition Score	Opposition Score	Opposition Score	Rank
Satwiksairaj Rankireddy; Chirag Shetty	Men's doubles	—N/a	Bye	Ali / Bhatti (PAK); W (21–8, 21–7)	Schueler / Tang (AUS); W (21–9, 21–11)	Chan P S / Tan K M (MAS); W (21–6, 21–15)	Lane / Vendy (ENG); W (21–15, 21–13)	1st place, gold medalist(s)
Gayatri Gopichand; Treesa Jolly	Women's doubles	—N/a	Bye	Leung / Mungrah (MRI); W (21–2, 21–4)	Richardson / Wynter (JAM); W (21–8, 21–6)	Tan / Muralitharan (MAS); L (13–21, 16–21)	Chen H-y / Somerville (AUS); W (21–15, 21–18)	3rd place, bronze medalist(s)
B. Sumeeth Reddy; Ashwini Ponnappa	Mixed doubles	Bye	Hemming / Pugh (ENG); L (18–21, 16–21)	Did not advance				

Mixed team

Summary

Team	Event	Group stage				Quarterfinal	Semifinal	Final / BM	
Team	Event	Opposition Score	Opposition Score	Opposition Score	Rank	Opposition Score	Opposition Score	Opposition Score	Rank
India	Mixed team	Pakistan; W 5–0	Sri Lanka; W 5–0	Australia; W 4–1	1 Q	South Africa; W 3–0	Singapore; W 3–0	Malaysia; L 1–3	2nd place, silver medalist(s)

Squad

- Srikanth Kidambi
- Satwiksairaj Rankireddy
- B. Sumeeth Reddy
- Lakshya Sen
- Chirag Shetty
- Gayatri Gopichand
- Treesa Jolly
- Aakarshi Kashyap
- Ashwini Ponnappa
- P. V. Sindhu

Group stage

Pos	Team	Pld	W	L	MF	MA	MD	GF	GA	GD	PF	PA	PD	Pts	Qualification
1	India	3	3	0	14	1	+13	28	2	+26	620	329	+291	3	Knockout stage
2	Sri Lanka	3	2	1	7	8	−1	14	16	−2	489	520	−31	2	Knockout stage
3	Australia	3	1	2	6	9	−3	12	18	−6	514	546	−32	1	
4	Pakistan	3	0	3	3	12	−9	6	24	−18	382	610	−228	0	

Source: BWF

India
5
National Exhibition Centre, Court 2
29 July 2022, 14:00 UTC+1

Pakistan
0

			1	2	3
1	(India) (Pakistan)	B. Sumeeth Reddy / Ashwini Ponnappa; Muhammad Irfan Saeed Bhatti / Ghazala Siddique	21; 9	21; 12
2	(India) (Pakistan)	Srikanth Kidambi; Murad Ali	21; 7	21; 12
3	(India) (Pakistan)	P. V. Sindhu; Mahoor Shahzad	21; 7	21; 6
4	(India) (Pakistan)	Satwiksairaj Rankireddy / Chirag Shetty; Murad Ali / Muhammad Irfan Saeed Bhatti	21; 12	21; 9
5	(India) (Pakistan)	Treesa Jolly / Gayatri Gopichand; Mahoor Shahzad / Ghazala Siddique	21; 4	21; 5

India
5
National Exhibition Centre, Court 3
30 July 2022, 09:00 UTC+1

Sri Lanka
0

			1	2	3
1	(India) (Sri Lanka)	Satwiksairaj Rankireddy / Ashwini Ponnappa; Sachin Dias / Thilini Hendahewa	21; 14	21; 9
2	(India) (Sri Lanka)	Lakshya Sen; Niluka Karunaratne	21; 18	21; 5
3	(India) (Sri Lanka)	Aakarshi Kashyap; Suhasni Vidanage	21; 3	21; 9
4	(India) (Sri Lanka)	Chirag Shetty / B. Sumeeth Reddy; Sachin Dias / Dumindu Abeywickrama	21; 10	21; 13
5	(India) (Sri Lanka)	Gayatri Gopichand / Treesa Jolly; Suhasni Vidanage / Thilini Hendahewa	21; 18	21; 6

India
4
National Exhibition Centre, Court 2
30 July 2022, 19:00 UTC+1

Australia
1

			1	2	3
1	(India) (Australia)	Srikanth Kidambi; Yingxiang Lin	21; 14	21; 13
2	(India) (Australia)	P. V. Sindhu; Chen Hsuan-yu	21; 10	21; 12
3	(India) (Australia)	B. Sumeeth Reddy / Chirag Shetty; Tran Hoang Pham / Jack Yu	21; 16	21; 19
4	(India) (Australia)	Treesa Jolly / Gayatri Gopichand; Chen Hsuan-yu / Gronya Somerville	13; 21	19; 21
5	(India) (Australia)	B. Sumeeth Reddy / Ashwini Ponnappa; Yingxiang Lin / Gronya Somerville	21; 14	21; 11

Quarter Finals

South Africa
0
National Exhibition Centre, Court 2
31 July 2022, 17:30 UTC+1

India
3

			1	2	3
1	(South Africa) (India)	Jarred Elliot / Deidré Laurens; B. Sumeeth Reddy / Ashwini Ponnappa	9; 21	11; 21
2	(South Africa) (India)	Carden Kakora; Lakshya Sen	5; 21	6; 21
3	(South Africa) (India)	Johanita Scholtz; Aakarshi Kashyap	11; 21	16; 21
4	(South Africa) (India)	Jarred Elliot / Robert Summers; Satwiksairaj Rankireddy / Chirag Shetty				not played
5	(South Africa) (India)	Deidré Laurens / Johanita Scholtz; Treesa Jolly / Gayatri Gopichand				not played

Semi-finals

Singapore
0
National Exhibition Centre
1 August 2022, 17:30 UTC+1

India
3

			1	2	3
1	(Singapore) (India)	Terry Hee / Andy Kwek; Satwiksairaj Rankireddy / Chirag Shetty	11; 21	12; 21
2	(Singapore) (India)	Yeo Jia Min; P. V. Sindhu	11; 21	12; 21
3	(Singapore) (India)	Loh Kean Yew; Lakshya Sen	18; 21	15; 21
4	(Singapore) (India)	Crystal Wong / Jin Yujia; Gayatri Gopichand / Treesa Jolly				not played
5	(Singapore) (India)	Terry Hee / Tan Wei Han; Satwiksairaj Rankireddy / Ashwini Ponnappa				not played

Final

Malaysia
3
National Exhibition Centre, Court 1
2 August 2022, 17:30 UTC+1

India
1

			1	2	3
1	(Malaysia) (India)	Aaron Chia / Soh Wooi Yik; Satwiksairaj Rankireddy / Chirag Shetty	21; 18	21; 15
2	(Malaysia) (India)	Goh Jin Wei; P. V. Sindhu	20; 22	17; 21
3	(Malaysia) (India)	Ng Tze Yong; Srikanth Kidambi	21; 19	6; 21	21; 16
4	(Malaysia) (India)	Pearly Tan / Thinaah Muralitharan; Treesa Jolly / Gayatri Gopichand	21; 18	21; 17
5	(Malaysia) (India)	Tan Kian Meng / Lai Pei Jing; Satwiksairaj Rankireddy / Ashwini Ponnappa				not played

== Boxing ==
Following the men's selection trials on 2 June 2022, eight boxers were selected for the competition. The women's trials and selection of four more boxers followed on 11 June 2022.

Men

Athlete	Event	Round of 32	Round of 16	Quarterfinals	Semifinals	Final	
Athlete	Event	Opposition Result	Opposition Result	Opposition Result	Opposition Result	Opposition Result	Rank
Amit Panghal	51 kg	—N/a	Berri (VAN); W 5–0	Mulligan (SCO); W 5–0	Chinyemba (ZAM); W 5–0	MacDonald (ENG); W 5–0	1st place, gold medalist(s)
Mohammad Hussamuddin	57 kg	Dyeyi (RSA); W 5–0	Hossain (BAN); W 5–0	Ndevelo (NAM); W 4–1	Commey (GHA); L 1–4	Did not advance	3rd place, bronze medalist(s)
Shiva Thapa	63.5 kg	Baloch (PAK); W 5–0	Lynch (SCO); L 1–4	Did not advance			
Rohit Tokas	67 kg	Bye	Kotey (GHA); W 5–0	Mata'afa-Ikinofo (NIU); W 5–0	Zimba (ZAM); L 2–3	Did not advance	3rd place, bronze medalist(s)
Sumit Kundu	75 kg	Bye	Peters (AUS); L 0–5	Did not advance			
Ashish Kumar	80 kg	Bye	Tapatuetoa (NIU); W 5–0	Bowen (ENG); L 1–4	Did not advance		
Sanjeet Kumar	92 kg	—N/a	Plodzicki-Faoagali (SAM); L 2–3	Did not advance			
Sagar Ahlawat	+92 kg	—N/a	Yegnong (CMR); W 5–0	Agnes (SEY); W 5–0	Onyekwere (NGR); W 5–0	Orie (ENG); L 0–5	2nd place, silver medalist(s)

Women

Athlete	Event	Round of 16	Quarterfinals	Semifinals	Final	
Athlete	Event	Opposition Result	Opposition Result	Opposition Result	Opposition Result	Rank
Nitu Ghanghas	48 kg	—N/a	Clyde (NIR); W ABD	Dhillon (CAN); W RSC	Resztan (ENG); W 5–0	1st place, gold medalist(s)
Nikhat Zareen	50 kg	Bagao (MOZ); W RSC	Jones (WAL); W 5–0	Stubley (ENG); W 5–0	McNaul (NIR); W 5–0	1st place, gold medalist(s)
Jaismine Lamboria	60 kg	Bye	Garton (NZL); W 4–1	Richardson (ENG); L 2–3	Did not advance	3rd place, bronze medalist(s)
Lovlina Borgohain	70 kg	Nicholson (NZL); W 5–0	Eccles (WAL); L 2–3	Did not advance		

== Cricket ==
By virtue of its position in the ICC Women's T20I rankings (as of 1 April 2021), India qualified for the tournament.

Fixtures were announced in November 2021.

Summary

Team	Event	Group stage				Semifinal	Final / BM	
Team	Event	Opposition Result	Opposition Result	Opposition Result	Rank	Opposition Result	Opposition Result	Rank
India women	Women's tournament	Australia; L by 3 wickets	Pakistan; W by 8 wickets	Barbados; W by 100 runs	2 Q	England; W by 4 runs	Australia; L by 9 runs	2nd place, silver medalist(s)

Roster

Fifteen players were officially selected on 11 July 2022.

- Harmanpreet Kaur (c)
- Smriti Mandhana (vc)
- Taniya Bhatia (wk)
- Yastika Bhatia (wk)
- Harleen Deol
- Rajeshwari Gayakwad
- Sabbhineni Meghana
- Sneh Rana
- Jemimah Rodrigues
- Deepti Sharma
- Meghna Singh
- Renuka Singh
- Pooja Vastrakar
- Shafali Verma
- Radha Yadav

Reserves: Simran Bahadur, Richa Ghosh, Poonam Yadav

Group play

Pos	Team	Pld	W	L	NR	Pts	NRR
1	Australia	3	3	0	0	6	2.832
2	India	3	2	1	0	4	2.511
3	Barbados	3	1	2	0	2	−2.953
4	Pakistan	3	0	3	0	0	−1.768

Source: ESPNcricinfo

29 July 2022
11:00
Scorecard

India; 154/8 (20 overs)	v	Australia; 157/7 (19 overs)
Harmanpreet Kaur 52 (34); Jess Jonassen 4/22 (4 overs)		Ashleigh Gardner 52* (35); Renuka Singh Thakur 4/18 (4 overs)

Australia won by 3 wickets
Edgbaston, Birmingham
Umpires: Lauren Agenbag (SA) and Sue Redfern (Eng)
Player of the match: Ashleigh Gardner (Aus)

- India won the toss and elected to bat.
- Meghna Singh (Ind) made her WT20I debut.
- Alyssa Healy (Aus) became the first player, male or female, to take 100 dismissals as a wicket-keeper in T20I cricket.

31 July 2022
11:00
Scorecard

Pakistan; 99 (18 overs)	v	India; 102/2 (11.4 overs)
Muneeba Ali 32 (30); Sneh Rana 2/15 (4 overs)		Smriti Mandhana 63* (42); Tuba Hassan 1/18 (2 overs)

India won by 8 wickets
Edgbaston, Birmingham
Umpires: Lauren Agenbag (SA) and Kim Cotton (NZ)
Player of the match: Smriti Mandhana (Ind)

- Pakistan won the toss and elected to bat.
- The match was reduced to 18 overs per side due to rain.

3 August 2022
18:00 (D/N)
Scorecard

India; 162/4 (20 overs)	v	Barbados; 62/8 (20 overs)
Jemimah Rodrigues 56* (46); Shanika Bruce 1/17 (2 overs)		Kyshona Knight 16 (20); Renuka Singh Thakur 4/10 (4 overs)

India won by 100 runs
Edgbaston, Birmingham
Umpires: Kim Cotton (NZ) and Shivani Mishra (Qat)
Player of the match: Renuka Singh Thakur (Ind)

- Barbados won the toss and elected to field.
- Shaunte Carrington (Bar) made her WT20I debut.

Semi-final

6 August 2022
11:00
Scorecard

India; 164/5 (20 overs)	v	England; 160/6 (20 overs)
Smriti Mandhana 61 (32); Freya Kemp 2/22 (3 overs)		Nat Sciver 41 (43); Sneh Rana 2/28 (4 overs)

India won by 4 runs
Edgbaston, Birmingham
Umpires: Kim Cotton (NZ) and Eloise Sheridan (Aus)
Player of the match: Smriti Mandhana (Ind)

- India won the toss and elected to bat.

Gold medal match

7 August 2022
17:00 (D/N)
Scorecard

Australia; 161/8 (20 overs)	v	India; 152 (19.3 overs)
Beth Mooney 61 (41); Renuka Singh Thakur 2/25 (4 overs)		Harmanpreet Kaur 65 (43); Ashleigh Gardner 3/16 (3 overs)

Australia won by 9 runs
Edgbaston, Birmingham
Umpires: Kim Cotton (NZ) and Jacqueline Williams (WI)
Player of the match: Beth Mooney (Aus)

- Australia won the toss and elected to bat.
- Yastika Bhatia (Ind) replaced Taniya Bhatia as a concussion substitute.

== Cycling ==
Thirteen cyclists (9 men and 4 women) have been officially selected to represent India at CWG 2022.

=== Track ===
Sprint

Athlete	Event	Qualification		Round 1	Quarterfinals	Semifinals	Final	
Athlete	Event	Time	Rank	Opposition Time	Opposition Time	Opposition Time	Opposition Time	Rank
Esow Alben	Men's individual	10.361	23	Did not advance				
Ronaldo Laitonjam	Men's individual	10.012	13 Q	Glaetzer (AUS); L +0.162	Did not advance			
David Elkatohchoongo	Men's individual	10.120	18	Did not advance				
Rojit Yanglem; Ronaldo Laitonjam; David Elkatohchoongo; Esow Alben	Men's team	44.702	6	—N/a			Did not advance	
Mayuri Lute	Women's individual	11.542	20	Did not advance				
Triyasha Paul	Women's individual	11.813	23	Did not advance				
Mayuri Lute; Triyasha Paul; Shushikala Agashe	Women's team	51.433	7	—N/a			Did not advance	

Keirin

Athlete	Event	First round	Repechage	Second round	Final
Athlete	Event	Rank	Rank	Rank	Rank
Esow Alben	Men	6 R	2	Did not advance	
David Elkatohchoongo	Men	4 R	2	Did not advance	
Shushikala Agashe	Women	6 R	4	Did not advance	
Triyasha Paul	Women	6 R	3	Did not advance	

Time trial

Athlete	Event	Time	Rank
Ronaldo Laitonjam	Men	1:02.500	12
Mayuri Lute	Women	36.868	18

Pursuit

Athlete	Event	Qualification		Final	
Athlete	Event	Time	Rank	Opponent Results	Rank
Dinesh Kumar	Men's individual	4:37.066	19	Did not advance	
Vishavjeet Singh	Men's individual	4:36.709	18	Did not advance	
Vishavjeet Singh; Naman Kapil; Venkappa Kengalagutti; Anantha Narayanan; Dinesh Kumar	Men's team	4:12.865	6	Did not advance	
Meenakshi Rohilla	Women's individual	3:49.596	15	Did not advance	

Points race

Athlete	Event	Final	
Athlete	Event	Points	Rank
Venkappa Kengalagutti	Men	—N/a	10 DNF
Naman Kapil	Men	—N/a	10 DNF

Scratch race

Athlete	Event	Qualification	Final
Vishavjeet Singh	Men	5 Q	13 DNF
Naman Kapil	Men	11	Did not advance
Meenakshi Rohilla	Women	—N/a	19 DNF

== Gymnastics ==
=== Artistic ===
Men
Team Final & Individual Qualification

Athlete	Event	Apparatus						Total	Rank
Athlete	Event	F	PH	R	V	PB	HB	Total	Rank
Yogeshwar Singh	Team	11.300	11.200	11.950	13.000	13.450	12.700	73.600	18 Q
Satyajit Mondal	Team	7.850	—N/a		13.400	—N/a			
Saif Tamboli	Team	—N/a				14.050	—N/a		
Total	Team	19.150	11.200	11.950	26.400	27.500	12.700	108.900	8

Individual Finals

Athlete	Event	Apparatus						Total	Rank
Athlete	Event	F	PH	R	V	PB	HB	Total	Rank
Yogeshwar Singh	All-around	11.500	12.900	12.350	13.200	12.050	12.700	74.700	15

Women
Team Final & Individual Qualification

Athlete	Event	Apparatus				Total	Rank
Athlete	Event	V	UB	BB	F	Total	Rank
Ruthuja Nataraj	Team	12.300	11.950	11.350	10.650	46.250	16 Q
Protistha Samanta	Team	12.900	—N/a				
Pranati Nayak	Team	13.600 Q	9.250	11.000	9.650	43.500	25
Total	Team	38.800	21.200	22.350	20.300	102.650	9

Individual events

Athlete	Event	Apparatus				Total	Rank
Athlete	Event	V	UB	BB	F	Total	Rank
Ruthuja Nataraj	All-around	12.950	10.000	10.250	9.800	43.000	17
Pranati Nayak	Vault	12.699	—N/a				5

=== Rhythmic ===
Individual Qualification

Athlete	Event	Apparatus				Total	Rank
Athlete	Event	Hoop	Ball	Clubs	Ribbon	Total	Rank
Bavleen Kaur	Qualification	18.100	18.750	18.450	17.400	72.700	29

== Hockey ==
By virtue of its position in the FIH World Rankings for men and women respectively (as of 1 February 2022), India qualified for both tournaments. Detailed fixtures were released on 9 March 2022.

Hockey India originally sought to send reserve squads to the Commonwealth Games; this was so the primary squads could focus on the Asian Games tournaments and attempt to qualify for the 2024 Summer Olympics at the first opportunity. Owing to the subsequent postponement of the 2022 Asian Games, a full-strength men's squad for the Commonwealth Games was confirmed on 20 June 2022; an experienced women's squad was also confirmed on 23 June 2022.

Summary

Key:

- FT = After full time
- P = Match decided by penalty-shootout

Team	Event	Preliminary round					Semifinal	Final / BM / PM	
Team	Event	Opposition Result	Opposition Result	Opposition Result	Opposition Result	Rank	Opposition Result	Opposition Result	Rank
India men	Men's tournament	Ghana; W 11–0	England; D 4–4	Canada; W 8–0	Wales; W 4–1	1 Q	South Africa; W 3–2	Australia; L 0–7	2nd place, silver medalist(s)
India women	Women's tournament	Ghana; W 5–0	Wales; W 3–1	England; L 1–3	Canada; W 3–2	2 Q	Australia; L 0–3^{P} FT: 1–1	New Zealand; W 2–1^{P} FT: 1–1	3rd place, bronze medalist(s)

=== Men's tournament ===
Roster

- P. R. Sreejesh (gk)
- Krishan Pathak (gk)
- Varun Kumar
- Surender Kumar
- Harmanpreet Singh (vc)
- Amit Rohidas
- Jugraj Singh
- Jarmanpreet Singh
- Manpreet Singh (c)
- Hardik Singh
- Vivek Prasad
- Shamsher Singh
- Akashdeep Singh
- Nilakanta Sharma
- Mandeep Singh
- Gurjant Singh
- Lalit Upadhyay
- Abhishek

Group play

Pos	Team	Pld	W	D	L	GF	GA	GD	Pts	Qualification
1	India	4	3	1	0	27	5	+22	10	Semi-finals
2	England (H)	4	3	1	0	25	8	+17	10	Semi-finals
3	Wales	4	2	0	2	14	10	+4	6	Fifth place match
4	Canada	4	0	1	3	4	25	−21	1	Seventh place match
5	Ghana	4	0	1	3	2	24	−22	1	Ninth place match

Source: Birmingham 2022
Rules for classification: 1) points; 2) number of wins; 3) goal difference; 4) goals scored; 5) head-to-head results.
(H) Hosts

31 July 2022
16:00

India	11–0	Ghana
Abhishek 2'; Harmanpreet 10', 36', 54'; Shamsher 14'; Akashdeep 20'; Jugraj 22', 45'; Nilakanta 39'; Varun 40'; Mandeep 48'	Report

Umpires:
Fraser Bell (SCO)
Tim Bond (NZL)

1 August 2022
16:00

England	4–4	India
Ansell 42'; Bandurak 47', 53'; Roper 51'	Report	Lalit 3'; Mandeep 13', 22'; Harmanpreet 46'

Umpires:
David Tomlinson (NZL)
Sean Rapaport (RSA)

3 August 2022
14:00

Canada	0–8	India
	Report	Harmanpreet 7', 56'; Amit 10'; Lalit 20'; Gurjant 27'; Akashdeep 37', 60'; Mandeep 58'

Umpires:
Peter Kabaso (KEN)
Ilanggo Kanabathu (MAS)

4 August 2022
14:00

India	4–1	Wales
Harmanpreet 18', 19', 41'; Gurjant 49'	Report	Furlong 55'

Umpires:
Nick Bennett (ENG)
Tyler Klenk (CAN)

Semi-final

6 August 2022
18:00

India	3–2	South Africa
Abhishek 20'; Mandeep 28'; Jugraj 58'	Report	Julius 33'; M. Cassiem 59'

Umpires:
Dan Barstow (ENG)
Steve Rogers (AUS)

Gold medal match

8 August 2022
12:30

Australia	7–0	India
Govers 9'; Ephraums 14', 42'; Anderson 22', 27'; Wickham 26'; Ogilvie 46'	Report

Umpires:
Dan Barstow (ENG)
David Tomlinson (NZL)

=== Women's tournament ===
Roster

- Savita Punia (c, gk)
- Rajani Etimarpu (gk)
- Deep Grace Ekka (vc)
- Gurjit Kaur
- Nikki Pradhan
- Udita Duhan
- Nisha Warsi
- Sushila Chanu
- Monika Malik
- Neha Goyal
- Jyoti
- Sonika Tandi
- Salima Tete
- Vandana Katariya
- Lalremsiami
- Navneet Kaur
- Sharmila Devi
- Sangita Kumari

Group play

Pos	Team	Pld	W	D	L	GF	GA	GD	Pts	Qualification
1	England (H)	4	4	0	0	21	1	+20	12	Semi-finals
2	India	4	3	0	1	12	6	+6	9	Semi-finals
3	Canada	4	2	0	2	14	5	+9	6	Fifth place match
4	Wales	4	1	0	3	5	12	−7	3	Seventh place match
5	Ghana	4	0	0	4	1	29	−28	0	Ninth place match

Source: Birmingham 2022
Rules for classification: 1) points; 2) number of wins; 3) goal difference; 4) goals scored; 5) head-to-head results.
(H) Hosts

29 July 2022
14:00

India	5–0	Ghana
Gurjit 3', 34'; Neha 28'; Sangita 36'; Salima 56'	Report

Umpires:
Wanri Venter (RSA)
Katrina Turner (NZL)

30 July 2022
19:00

India	3–1	Wales
Vandana 26', 48'; Gurjit 28'	Report	Hughes 45'

Umpires:
Cookie Tan (SGP)
Lelia Sacre (CAN)

2 August 2022
14:00

India	1–3	England
Vandana 60'	Report	Ansley 3'; Howard 40'; Martin 52'

Umpires:
Wanri Venter (RSA)
Cookie Tan (SGP)

3 August 2022
11:00

Canada	2–3	India
Stairs 23'; Haughn 39'	Report	Salima 3'; Navneet 22'; Lalremsiami 51'

Umpires:
Katrina Turner (NZL)
Hannah Harrison (ENG)

Semi-final

5 August 2022
20:15

Australia	1–1	India
Greiner 10'	Report	Vandana 49'
Penalties
Malone (penalty shoot-out scored); Nobbs (penalty shoot-out scored); Lawton (penalty shoot-out scored)	3–0	(penalty shoot-out missed) Lalremsiami; (penalty shoot-out missed) Neha; (penalty shoot-out missed) Navneet

Umpires:
Amber Church (NZL)
Hannah Harrison (ENG)

Bronze medal match

7 August 2022
09:00

New Zealand	1–1	India
Merry 60'	Report	Salima 29'
Penalties
Hull (penalty shoot-out scored); Ralph (penalty shoot-out missed); Tynan (penalty shoot-out missed); Doar (penalty shoot-out missed); Shannon (penalty shoot-out missed)	1–2	(penalty shoot-out missed) Sangita; (penalty shoot-out scored) Sonika; (penalty shoot-out scored) Navneet; (penalty shoot-out missed) Neha

Umpires:
Rachel Williams (ENG)
Aleisha Neumann (AUS)

== Judo ==
India announced a six-member judo team following selection trials held from May 23 to May 26.

Men

Athlete	Event	Round of 32	Round of 16	Quarterfinals	Semifinals	Repechage	Final / BM	
Athlete	Event	Opposition Result	Opposition Result	Opposition Result	Opposition Result	Opposition Result	Opposition Result	Rank
Vijay Kumar Yadav	60 kg	Bye	Gangaya (MRI); W 10–0s1	Katz (AUS); L 0s2–10s1	Did not advance	Munro (SCO); W 1s2–0s1	Christodoulides (CYP); W 10–0	3rd place, bronze medalist(s)
Jasleen Singh Saini	66 kg	—N/a	Cugola (VAN); W 10s1–0	Burns (NIR); W 10s1–0s3	Allan (SCO); L 0s1–10	Bye	Katz (AUS); L 0–10s2	5
Deepak Deswal	100 kg	—N/a	Omgba Fouda (CMR); W10s2–0s3	Lovell-Hewitt (ENG); L 0s3–10	Did not advance	Takayawa (FIJ); L 0–10	Did not advance	

Women

Athlete	Event	Round of 16	Quarterfinals	Semifinals	Repechage	Final / BM	
Athlete	Event	Opposition Result	Opposition Result	Opposition Result	Opposition Result	Opposition Result	Rank
Shushila Likmabam	48 kg	Bye	Boniface (MAW); W 10s1–0s1	Morand (MRI); W 10s2–0s2	—N/a	Whitebooi (RSA); L 0s2–1s2	2nd place, silver medalist(s)
Suchika Tariyal	57 kg	Kabinda (ZAM); W 10s1–1s1	Deguchi (CAN); L 0–11	Did not advance	Breytenbach (RSA); W 11s1–0	Legentil (MRI); L 0s1–1s2	5
Tulika Maan	+78 kg	Bye	Durhone (MRI); W 10–0s2	Andrews (NZL); W 10s1–1	—N/a	Adlington (SCO); L 1s2–10	2nd place, silver medalist(s)

== Lawn bowls ==
Men

Athlete	Event	Group stage					Quarterfinal	Semifinal	Final / BM	
Athlete	Event	Opposition Score	Opposition Score	Opposition Score	Opposition Score	Rank	Opposition Score	Opposition Score	Opposition Score	Rank
Mridul Borgohain	Singles	McIlroy (NZL); L 8–21	Locke (FLK); W 21–5	McLean (SCO); W 21–19	Davis (JEY); L 13–21	4	Did not advance			
Sunil Bahadur; Dinesh Kumar	Pairs	Malaysia; L 14–17	Falkland Islands; W 36–4	Cook Islands; W 13–10	England; W 18–15	2 Q	Northern Ireland; L 8–26	Did not advance		
Navneet Singh; Mridul Borgohain; Chandan Singh	Triples	New Zealand; L 6–23	Scotland; L 12–19	Malta; D 16–16	—N/a	4	Did not advance			
Sunil Bahadur; Navneet Singh; Chandan Singh; Dinesh Kumar	Fours	Fiji; W 14–11	Cook Islands; W 20–10	England; L 11–20	—N/a	2 Q	Canada; W 14–10	England; W 13–12	Northern Ireland; L 5–18	2nd place, silver medalist(s)

Women

Athlete	Event	Group stage					Quarterfinal	Semifinal	Final / BM	
Athlete	Event	Opposition Score	Opposition Score	Opposition Score	Opposition Score	Rank	Opposition Score	Opposition Score	Opposition Score	Rank
Tania Choudhury	Singles	Hoggan (SCO); L 10–21	Arthur-Almond (FLK); L 20–21	Daniels (WAL); L 10–21	O'Neill (NIR); W 21–12	4	Did not advance			
Nayanmoni Saikia; Lovely Choubey	Pairs	New Zealand; L 9–18	Niue; W 23–6	South Africa; D 16–16	—N/a	2 Q	England; L 14–18	Did not advance		
Tania Choudhury; Rupa Rani Tirkey; Pinki Singh	Triples	New Zealand; W 15–11	England; L 11–24	Niue; W 28–7	—N/a	3	Did not advance			
Rupa Rani Tirkey; Nayanmoni Saikia; Lovely Choubey; Pinki Singh	Fours	England; L 9–18	Cook Islands; W 15–9	Canada; W 17–7	—N/a	2 Q	Norfolk Island; W 17–9	New Zealand; W 16–13	South Africa; W 17–10	1st place, gold medalist(s)

== Para powerlifting ==
Athlete	Event	Weight Lifted	Points	Rank
Parmjeet Kumar	Men's lightweight	NM	DNF	
Sudhir	Men's heavyweight	~~212~~	~~134.5 GR~~	DQ (Note: Sudhir initially won the gold medal in the event. However, he was later disqualified for doping violations.)
Sakina Khatun	Women's lightweight	88	87.5	5
Manpreet Kaur	Women's lightweight	90	89.6	4

== Squash ==
As of 12 July 2022, a team of 9 athletes will represent India in the squash competition at the Games.

Singles

Athlete	Event	Round of 64	Round of 32	Round of 16/PR16	Quarterfinals/PQF	Semifinals/PSF	Final/BM/PF	
Athlete	Event	Opposition Score	Opposition Score	Opposition Score	Opposition Score	Opposition Score	Opposition Score	Rank
Saurav Ghosal	Men's singles	Bye	Wakeel (SRI); W 3–0	Baillargeon (CAN); W 3–0	Lobban (SCO); W 3–1	Coll (NZL); L 0–3	Willstrop (ENG); W 3–0	3rd place, bronze medalist(s)
Ramit Tandon	Men's singles	Bye	Binnie (JAM); L (w/o)	Did not advance				
Abhay Singh	Men's singles	Chapman (IVB); W 3–0	Clyne (SCO); L 0–1 RET	Did not advance				
Joshna Chinappa	Women's singles	Bye	Best (BAR); W 3–0	Watts (NZL); W 3–1	Naughton (CAN); L 0–3	Did not advance		
Sunayna Kuruvilla	Women's singles	Bye	Azman (MAS); L 0–3	Bye	Sinaly (SRI); W 3–0	Zafar (PAK); W 3–0	Fung-A-Fat (GUY); W 3–0	17
Anahat Singh	Women's singles	Ross (SVG); W 3–0	Whitlock (WAL); L 1–3	Did not advance				

Doubles

Athlete	Event	Round of 32	Round of 16	Quarterfinal	Semifinal	Final / BM	
Athlete	Event	Opposition Score	Opposition Score	Opposition Score	Opposition Score	Opposition Score	Rank
Velavan Senthilkumar; Abhay Singh	Men's doubles	Reich / Chapman (IVB); W 2–0	Kempsell / Clyne (SCO); W 2–1	Ng E Y / Yuen (MAS); L 0–2	Did not advance		
Anahat Singh; Sunayna Kuruvilla	Women's doubles	Kuruppu / Sinaly (SRI); W 2–0	Lobban / Grinham (AUS); L 0–2	Did not advance			
Joshna Chinappa; Dipika Pallikal	Women's doubles	Bye	Best / Haywood (BAR); W 2–0	Chan Yw / Ampandi (MAS); L 0–2	Did not advance		
Dipika Pallikal; Saurav Ghosal	Mixed doubles	Bye	Whitlock / Creed (WAL); W 2–0	Grinham / Alexander (AUS); W 2–0	King / Coll (NZL); L 0–2	Lobban / Pilley (AUS); W 2–0	3rd place, bronze medalist(s)
Joshna Chinappa; Harinder Pal Sandhu	Mixed doubles	Kuruppu / Laksiri (SRI); W 2–1	Lobban / Pilley (AUS); L 0–2	Did not advance			

== Swimming ==
India declared its four-member swimming team on 25 June 2022.

Men

Athlete	Event	Heat		Semifinal/SO		Final	
Athlete	Event	Time	Rank	Time	Rank	Time	Rank
Sajan Prakash	50 m butterfly	25.01	24	Did not advance			
Sajan Prakash	100 m butterfly	54.36	19	54.24	16	Did not advance	
Sajan Prakash	200 m butterfly	1:58.99	9	1:58.31	1	Did not advance	
Srihari Nataraj	50 m backstroke	25.52	8 Q	25.38	8 Q	25.23	5
Srihari Nataraj	100 m backstroke	54.68	5 Q	54.55	7 Q	54.31	7
Srihari Nataraj	200 m backstroke	2:00.84	9 NR	—N/a		Did not advance	
Kushagra Rawat	200 m freestyle	1:54.56	25	—N/a		Did not advance	
Kushagra Rawat	400 m freestyle	3:57.45	14	—N/a		Did not advance	
Kushagra Rawat	1500 m freestyle	15:47.77	8 Q	—N/a		15:42.67	8
Advait Page	1500 m freestyle	15:39.25	7 Q	—N/a		15:32.36	7
Suyash Jadhav	50 m freestyle S7	—N/a				31.30	5
Niranjan Mukundan	50 m freestyle S7	—N/a				32.55	7
Ashish Kumar	100 m backstroke S9	—N/a				1:18.21	8

== Table tennis ==
India qualified for both the men's and women's team events via the ITTF World Team Rankings (as of 2 January 2020). Seven players were selected on 31 May 2022; the women's selections were provisional and dependent on SAI approval since Archana Kamath was selected even though she did not satisfy the selection criteria.

The SAI returned responsibility for the decision back to the Committee of Administrators; (Note: The CoA manage the TTFI, which (as of 7 June 2022) is suspended.) Diya Chitale, who filed a writ petition to the Delhi High Court protesting her non-selection, replaced Kamath in the amended squad. Another player was also added to the men's squad.

Singles

Athletes	Event	Group stage				Round of 32	Round of 16	Quarterfinal	Semifinal	Final / BM	
Athletes	Event	Opposition Score	Opposition Score	Opposition Score	Rank	Opposition Score	Opposition Score	Opposition Score	Opposition Score	Opposition Score	Rank
Sharath Achanta	Men's singles	Bye				Luu (AUS); W 4–0	Omotayo (NGR); W 4–2	Quek (SGP); W 4–0	Drinkhall (ENG); W 4–2	Pitchford (ENG); W 4–1	1st place, gold medalist(s)
Sathiyan Gnanasekaran	Men's singles	Bye				McCreery (NIR); W 4–0	Lum (AUS); W 4–2	Walker (ENG); W 4–2	Pitchford (ENG); L 1–4	Drinkhall (ENG); W 4–3	3rd place, bronze medalist(s)
Sanil Shetty	Men's singles	Bye				Abrefa (GHA); W 4–0	Abiodun (NGR); W 4–2	Pitchford (ENG); L 1–4	Did not advance		
Sreeja Akula	Women's singles	Bye				Lyne (MAS); W 4–1	Carey (WAL); W 4–3	Zhang M (CAN); W 4–3	Feng Tw (SGP); L 3–4	Liu Yz (AUS); L 3–4	4
Manika Batra	Women's singles	Bye				Fu C N (CAN); W 4–0	Jee Mh (AUS); W 4–0	Zeng J (SGP); L 0–4	Did not advance		
Reeth Tennison	Women's singles	Bye				Bardsley (ENG); W 4–1	Feng Tw (SGP); L 1–4	Did not advance			

Para-Singles

Athletes	Event	Group stage				Semifinal	Final / BM	
Athletes	Event	Opposition Score	Opposition Score	Opposition Score	Rank	Opposition Score	Opposition Score	Rank
Raj Alagar	Men's singles C3–5	Wyndham (SLE); W 3–2	Ogunkunle (NGR); L 1–3	Bullen (ENG); W 3–1	2 Q	Sule (NGR); L 1–3	Ogunkunle (NGR); L 0–3	4
Bhavina Patel	Women's singles C3–5	Di Toro (AUS); W 3–1	Ikpeoyi (NGR); W 3–0	Latu (FIJ); W 3–0	1 Q	Bailey (ENG); W 3–0	Ikpeoyi (NGR); W 3–0	1st place, gold medalist(s)
Sonalben Patel	Women's singles C3–5	Bailey (ENG); W 3–1	Tscharke (AUS); W 3–0	Obiora (NGR); W 3–1	1 Q	Ikpeoyi (NGR); L 1–3	Bailey (ENG); W 3–0	3rd place, bronze medalist(s)
Sahana Ravi	Women's singles C6–10	Obazuaye (NGR); L 0–3	Gloria W S (MAS); L 2–3	Yang Qa (AUS); L 0–3	4	Did not advance		

Doubles

Athletes	Event	Round of 64	Round of 32	Round of 16	Quarterfinal	Semifinal	Final / BM	
Athletes	Event	Opposition Score	Opposition Score	Opposition Score	Opposition Score	Opposition Score	Opposition Score	Rank
Sanil Shetty; Harmeet Desai	Men's doubles	Bye	Elia / Savva (CYP); W 3–0	Chambers / Yan (AUS); W 3–1	Chew / Poh (SGP); L 0–3	Did not advance		
Sathiyan Gnanasekaran; Sharath Achanta	Men's doubles	Bye	Alleyne / Van Lange (GUY); W 3–0	Bawm / Ridoy (BAN); W 3–0	Jarvis / Walker (ENG); W 3–0	Lum / Luu (AUS); W 3–2	Drinkhall / Pitchford (ENG); L 2–3	2nd place, silver medalist(s)
Manika Batra; Diya Chitale	Women's doubles	Bye	Chung / Spicer (TTO); W 3–0	Hosenally / Jalim (MRI); W 3–0	Carey / Hursey (WAL); L 1–3	Did not advance		
Sreeja Akula; Reeth Tennison	Women's doubles	Bye	Elliott / Plaistow (SCO); W 3–0	Thomas W Z / Whitton (WAL); W 3–0	Wong Xr / Zhou Jy (SGP); L 1–3	Did not advance		
Sathiyan Gnanasekaran; Manika Batra	Mixed doubles	Bye	Crea / Sinon (SEY); W 3–0	Omotayo / Ojomu (NGR); W 3–0	Choong / Lyne (MAS); L 2–3	Did not advance		
Sanil Shetty; Reeth Tennison	Mixed doubles	Wong Q S / Tee A X (MAS); L 2–3	Did not advance					
Sharath Achanta; Sreeja Akula	Mixed doubles	Bye	Cathcart / Earley (NIR); W 3–0	Leong C F / Ho Y (MAS); W 3–1	Pitchford / Ho (ENG); W 3–2	Lum / Jee Mh (AUS); W 3–2	Choong / Lyne (MAS); W 3–1	1st place, gold medalist(s)

Team

Athletes	Event	Group stage				Quarterfinal	Semifinal	Final / BM	
Athletes	Event	Opposition Score	Opposition Score	Opposition Score	Rank	Opposition Score	Opposition Score	Opposition Score	Rank
Harmeet Desai; Sanil Shetty; Sharath Achanta; Sathiyan Gnanasekaran	Men's team	Barbados; W 3–0	Singapore; W 3–0	Northern Ireland; W 3–0	1 Q	Bangladesh; W 3–0	Nigeria; W 3–0	Singapore; W 3–1	1st place, gold medalist(s)
Diya Chitale; Manika Batra; Reeth Tennison; Sreeja Akula	Women's team	South Africa; W 3–0	Fiji; W 3–0	Guyana; W 3–0	1 Q	Malaysia; L 2–3	Did not advance		

== Triathlon ==
A squad of four triathletes (two per gender) was selected for the competition; the men will be named at a later date.

Individual

Athlete	Event	Swim (750 m)	Trans 1	Bike (20 km)	Trans 2	Run (5 km)	Total	Rank
Adarsh Nair	Men	9:51	1:02	31:14	0:27	18:04	1:00:38	30
Vishwanath Yadav	Men	10:55	1:05	32:24	0:22	18:06	1:02:52	33
Sanjana Joshi	Women	11:16	0:52	33:21	0:27	23:04	1:09:00	28
Pragnya Mohan	Women	11:26	1:11	32:53	0:25	21:32	1:07:27	26

Mixed Relay

Athlete	Event	Time						Rank
Athlete	Event	Swim (300 m)	Trans 1	Bike (5 km)	Trans 2	Run (2 km)	Total group	Rank
Adarsh Nair	Mixed relay	4:17	0:47	7:54	0:21	7:12	20:31	—N/a
Pragnya Mohan	Mixed relay	5:45	0:55	8:37	0:21	8:31	24:09	—N/a
Vishwanath Yadav	Mixed relay	5:08	0:51	7:54	0:24	7:54	22:11	—N/a
Sanjana Joshi	Mixed relay	5:24	0:52	8:46	0:24	9:26	24:52	—N/a
Total	Mixed relay	—N/a					1:31:43	10

== Weightlifting ==
A squad of 15 weightlifters was confirmed on 13 April 2022.

Jeremy Lalrinnunga, Achinta Sheuli, Ajay Singh and Purnima Pandey qualified for the competition by winning gold at the 2021 Commonwealth Weightlifting Championships in Tashkent, Uzbekistan. The other 11 qualified via the IWF Commonwealth Ranking List, which was finalised on 9 March 2022.

Men

Athlete	Event	Snatch		Clean & jerk		Total	Rank
Athlete	Event	Result	Rank	Result	Rank	Total	Rank
Sanket Sargar	55 kg	113	1	135	2	248	2nd place, silver medalist(s)
Gururaja Poojary	61 kg	118	4	151	3	269	3rd place, bronze medalist(s)
Jeremy Lalrinnunga	67 kg	140 GR	1	160	2	300 GR	1st place, gold medalist(s)
Achinta Sheuli	73 kg	143 GR	1	170	1	313 GR	1st place, gold medalist(s)
Ajay Singh	81 kg	143	3	176	4	319	4
Vikas Thakur	96 kg	155	3	191	2	346	2nd place, silver medalist(s)
Lovepreet Singh	109 kg	163 NR	2	192 NR	4	355 NR	3rd place, bronze medalist(s)
Gurdeep Singh	+109 kg	167	3	223 NR	3	390	3rd place, bronze medalist(s)

Women

Athlete	Event	Snatch		Clean & jerk		Total	Rank
Athlete	Event	Result	Rank	Result	Rank	Total	Rank
Saikhom Mirabai Chanu	49 kg	88 CR	1	113 GR	1	201 GR	1st place, gold medalist(s)
Bindyarani Devi	55 kg	86 PB	3	116 NR/GR	1	202 NR	2nd place, silver medalist(s)
Popy Hazarika	59 kg	81	7	102	7	183	7
Harjinder Kaur	71 kg	93 PB	4	119	3	212	3rd place, bronze medalist(s)
Punam Yadav	76 kg	98	2	NM		DNF	
Usha Kumara	87 kg	95	5	110	5	205	6
Purnima Pandey	+87 kg	103 PB	5	125	6	228	6

== Wrestling ==
Following the women's selection trials on 16 May 2022, six wrestlers were selected for the competition. The men's trials and selection of six more wrestlers followed on 17 May 2022.

Key:

- VFA – Victory by Fall.
- VPO1 – Decision by Points – the loser with technical points.
- VPO – Decision by Points – the loser without technical points.
- VSU – Technical superiority – the loser without technical points and a margin of victory of at least 10 points.
- VSU1 – Technical superiority – the loser with technical points and a margin of victory of at least 10 points.
- VB – Victory by Injury
- VFO - Victory by Forfeit - if an athlete does not show up on the mat

Men

Athlete	Event	Round of 16	Quarterfinal	Semifinal	Repechage	Final / BM	
Athlete	Event	Opposition Result	Opposition Result	Opposition Result	Opposition Result	Opposition Result	Rank
Ravi Kumar Dahiya	57 kg	Bye	Singh (NZL); W 10–0^{VSU}	Ali (PAK); W 14–4^{VSU1}	—N/a	Welson (NGR); W 10–0^{VSU}	1st place, gold medalist(s)
Bajrang Punia	65 kg	Bingham (NRU); W 4–0^{VFA}	Bandou (MRI); W 6–0^{VFA}	Ramm (ENG); W 10–0^{VSU}	—N/a	McNeil (CAN); W 9–2^{VPO1}	1st place, gold medalist(s)
Naveen Malik	74 kg	John (NGR); W 13–3^{VSU1}	Lou H Y (SGP); W 10–0^{VSU}	Bowling (ENG); W 12–1^{VSU1}	—N/a	Tahir (PAK); W 9–0^{VPO}	1st place, gold medalist(s)
Deepak Punia	86 kg	Oxenham (NZL); W 10–0^{VSU}	Kassegbama (SLE); W 10–0^{VSU}	Moore (CAN); W 3–1^{VPO1}	—N/a	Inam (PAK); W 3–0^{VPO}	1st place, gold medalist(s)
Deepak Nehra	97 kg	Bye	Randhawa (CAN); L 6–8^{VPO1}	Did not advance	Bye	Raza (PAK); W 10–2^{VPO1}	3rd place, bronze medalist(s)
Mohit Grewal	125 kg	Bye	Kaouslidis (CYP); W 10–1^{VPO1}	Dhesi (CAN); L 2–12^{VSU1}	Bye	Johnson (JAM); W 6–0^{VFA}	3rd place, bronze medalist(s)

Women

Group stage Format

Athlete	Event	Group stage			Semifinal	Final / BM	
Athlete	Event	Opposition Result	Opposition Result	Rank	Opposition Result	Opposition Result	Rank
Pooja Gehlot	50 kg	Letchidjio (SCO); W 12–2^{VSU1}	Muambo (CMR); W ^{VFO}	1 Q	Parks (CAN); L 6–9^{VPO1}	Letchidjio (SCO); W 12–2^{VSU1}	3rd place, bronze medalist(s)

Nordic Format

Athlete	Event	Nordic Round Robin			Rank
Athlete	Event	Opposition Result	Opposition Result	Opposition Result	Rank
Vinesh Phogat	53 kg	Stewart (CAN); W 2–0^{VFA}	Adekuoroye (NGR); W 6–0^{VPO1}	Maduravalage (SRI); W 4–0^{VFA}	1st place, gold medalist(s)

Repechage Format

Athlete	Event	Round of 16	Quarterfinal	Semifinal	Repechage	Final / BM	
Athlete	Event	Opposition Result	Opposition Result	Opposition Result	Opposition Result	Opposition Result	Rank
Anshu Malik	57 kg	Bye	Symeonidis (AUS); W 10–0^{VSU}	Poruthotage (SRI); W 10–0^{VSU}	—N/a	Adekuoroye (NGR); L 3–7^{VPO1}	2nd place, silver medalist(s)
Sakshi Malik	62 kg	—N/a	Barnes (ENG); W 10–0^{VFA}	Ngolle (CMR); W 10–0^{VSU}	—N/a	Godinez (CAN); W 4–4^{VFA}	1st place, gold medalist(s)
Divya Kakran	68 kg	Bye	Oborududu (NGR); L 0–11^{VSU}	Did not advance	Ngiri (CMR); W 4–0^{VFA}	Cocker-Lemalie (TGA); W 2–0^{VFA}	3rd place, bronze medalist(s)
Pooja Sihag	76 kg	—N/a	Montague (NZL); W 5–3^{VPO1}	Di Stasio (CAN); L 0–6^{VPO}	Bye	De Bruine (AUS); W 11–0^{VSU}	3rd place, bronze medalist(s)

== See also ==
- India at the 2022 Winter Olympics
- India at the 2022 Asian Games
