= Table tennis at the 2022 Commonwealth Games =

- Venue: National Exhibition Centre
- Location: Birmingham, England
- Dates: 29 July to 8 August 2022
- Competitors: 190 from 34 nations

Table tennis at the 2022 Commonwealth Games was the sixth appearance of Table tennis at the Commonwealth Games. The table tennis competition at the 2022 Commonwealth Games was held in Birmingham, England. This was the sixth edition since its inclusion in 2002, and the second staging within England specifically.

The competition took place between 29 July and 8 August 2022, spread across eleven events (including four parasport events).

== Schedule ==
The competition schedule is as follows:

G	Preliminary matches (group)	P	Preliminary matches (knockout)	¼	Quarter-finals	½	Semi-finals	B	Bronze medal match	F	Gold medal match

Date Event	Fri 29		Sat 30		Sun 31		Mon 1			Tue 2		Wed 3		Thu 4		Fri 5		Sat 6			Sun 7				Mon 8	
Session →	M	E	M	E	M	E	M		E	A		M	E	M	E	M	E	M	E		M		E		M	
Men's singles												G				P		¼					½		B	F
Men's doubles														P		P	¼	½			B	F				
Men's team	G		G		¼				½	B	F															
Women's singles												G			P	P	¼	½			B	F				
Women's doubles														P		P		P	¼				½		B	F
Women's team	G		G	¼		½	B	F																		
Mixed doubles														P		P	¼	½					B	F		
Parasport
Men's singles C3–5												G		G		½			B	F						
Men's singles C8–10												G		G		½					B	F				
Women's singles C3–5												G		G		½			B	F						
Women's singles C6–10												G		G		½			B	F						

== Venue ==
The table tennis competitions are being held at the National Exhibition Centre in Solihull. Five other sports - badminton, boxing, netball, para powerlifting, and weightlifting - will also take place there.

== Medal summary ==
=== Medal table ===
* Host nation (England)

Rank	CGA	Gold	Silver	Bronze	Total
1	India	4	1	2	7
2	Singapore	3	2	2	7
3	England*	2	1	2	5
4	Australia	1	3	2	6
5	Wales	1	0	1	2
6	Nigeria	0	2	2	4
7	Malaysia	0	2	0	2
Totals (7 entries)		11	11	11	33

=== Medallists ===
Event	Gold	Silver	Bronze
Men's singles	Sharath Kamal; India	Liam Pitchford; England	Sathiyan Gnanasekaran; India
Women's singles	Feng Tianwei; Singapore	Zeng Jian; Singapore	Liu Yangzi; Australia
Men's doubles	England; Paul Drinkhall; Liam Pitchford	India; Sharath Kamal; Sathiyan Gnanasekaran	Singapore; Poh Shao Feng Ethan; Clarence Chew
Women's doubles	Singapore; Feng Tianwei; Zeng Jian	Australia; Jee Minhyung; Jian Fang Lay	Wales; Charlotte Carey; Anna Hursey
Mixed doubles	India; Sharath Kamal; Sreeja Akula	Malaysia; Choong Javen; Karen Lyne	Singapore; Clarence Chew; Zeng Jian
Men's team	India; Harmeet Desai; Sathiyan Gnanasekaran; Sharath Kamal; Sanil Shetty	Singapore; Clarence Chew; Poh Shao Feng Ethan; Pang Yew En Koen; Izaac Quek	England; Paul Drinkhall; Tom Jarvis; Liam Pitchford; Sam Walker
Women's team	Singapore; Zeng Jian; Zhou Jing Yi; Feng Tianwei; Wong Xin Ru	Malaysia; Tee Ai Xin; Alice Chang; Karen Lyne; Ho Ying	Australia; Feng Chunyi; Jian Fang Lay; Jee Minhyung; Liu Yangzi

==== Para ====
Event	Gold	Silver	Bronze
Men's C3–5	Jack Hunter-Spivey; England	Nasiru Sule; Nigeria	Isau Ogunkunle; Nigeria
Men's C8–10	Joshua Stacey; Wales	Ma Lin; Australia	Ross Wilson; England
Women's C3–5	Bhavina Patel; India	Ifechukwude Ikpeoyi; Nigeria	Sonalben Patel; India
Women's C6–10	Yang Qian; Australia	Lei Lina; Australia	Faith Obazuaye; Nigeria

== Qualification ==
=== Table tennis ===
A total of 160 players (80 per gender) qualified to compete at the Games. The majority achieved team qualification as follows:

- The host nation.
- Nations on the ITTF World Team Rankings as of 2 January 2020.
- Recipients of CGF/ITTF Bipartite Invitations (one nation per CGF region).
- The highest-ranked nation not yet qualified.

In addition, players not in qualified teams were individually picked as follows:

- Region-specific invitations (2 per region).
- Players on the ITTF World Singles Rankings as of 2 January 2020.
- General invitations.

=== Para table tennis ===
A total of 32 players (16 per gender) will qualify to compete at the Games. They will qualify for each competition as follows:

- Players on the ITTF Para Table Tennis Rankings as of 1 May 2022 (one per CGF region).
- A player on the aforementioned ranking not already qualified.
- Recipients of CGF/ITTF Bipartite Invitations.

== Participating nations ==
There were 34 participating Commonwealth Games Associations (CGA's) in table tennis and para-table tennis with a total of 190 (94 men and 96 women) athletes. The number of athletes a nation entered is in parentheses beside the name of the country.

- Australia (14)
- Bangladesh (6)
- Barbados (4)
- Cameroon (1)
- Canada (10)
- Cyprus (6)
- England (13)
- Falkland Islands (1)
- Fiji (7)
- Ghana (6)
- Guyana (8)
- India (12)
- Jersey (2)
- Kenya (2)
- Malaysia (10)
- Maldives (5)
- Mauritius (8)
- Nigeria (15)
- Northern Ireland (5)
- Pakistan (1)
- Papua New Guinea (2)
- Saint Lucia (1)
- Saint Vincent and the Grenadines (4)
- Scotland (4)
- Seychelles (4)
- Sierra Leone (1)
- Singapore (8)
- Solomon Islands (3)
- South Africa (8)
- Trinidad and Tobago (3)
- Uganda (4)
- Vanuatu (3)
- Wales (7)
