= Wrestling at the 2022 Commonwealth Games – Women's freestyle 53 kg =

Wrestling competition

Wrestling – Women's freestyle 53 kg at the 2022 Commonwealth Games
- Venue: Coventry Arena
- Dates: 6 August 2022
- Competitors: 4 from 4 nations

Medalists
gold medal	Vinesh Phogat	India
silver medal	Samantha Stewart	Canada

The Women's freestyle 53 kg wrestling competitions at the 2022 Commonwealth Games in Birmingham, England took place on 6 August at the Coventry Arena. A total of four competitors from four nations took part.

As there were less than 6 competitors entered in this event, the competition was contested as a Nordic round with each athlete playing every other athlete. The medallists were determined by the standings after the completion of the Nordic round.

== Results ==
The draw is as follows:

Legend

- F — Won by fall

=== Nordic group ===
Pos	Athlete	Pld	W	L	CP	TP
1	Vinesh Phogat (IND)	3	3	0	13	12
2	Samantha Stewart (CAN)	3	2	1	7	18
3	Mercy Adekuoroye (NGR)	3	1	2	5	15
4	Chamodya Don (SRI)	3	0	3	1	2

Source: UWW

	Score		CP
Mercy Adekuoroye (NGR)	10–0	Chamodya Don (SRI)	4–0 VSU
Vinesh Phogat (IND)	2–0 Fall	Samantha Stewart (CAN)	5–0 VFA
Chamodya Don (SRI)	2–12	Samantha Stewart (CAN)	1–4 VSU1
Mercy Adekuoroye (NGR)	0–6	Vinesh Phogat (IND)	0–3 VPO
Mercy Adekuoroye (NGR)	5–6	Samantha Stewart (CAN)	1–3 VPO1
Chamodya Don (SRI)	0–4 Fall	Vinesh Phogat (IND)	0–5 VFA
