= Table tennis at the 2022 Commonwealth Games – Women's singles C6–10 =

Table tennis – Women's singles C6–10 at the 2022 Commonwealth Games
- Venue: National Exhibition Centre
- Dates: 3 - 6 August 2022
- Competitors: 8 from 7 nations

Medalists
gold medal	Yang Qian	Australia
silver medal	Lei Lina	Australia
bronze medal	Faith Obazuaye	Nigeria

Table tennis women's singles C6–10 at the 2022 Commonwealth Games is held at the National Exhibition Centre at Birmingham, England from 3 to 6 August 2022.

== Finals ==
Semifinals
Yang Qian (AUS)	11	11	11
Felicity Pickard (ENG)	4	1	3
Faith Obazuaye (NGR)	7	9	6
Lei Lina (AUS)	11	11	11

Gold medal match
Yang Qian (AUS)	12	16	7	11
Lei Lina (AUS)	10	14	11
Bronze medal match
Felicity Pickard (ENG)	11	7	6	8
Faith Obazuaye (NGR)	6	11	11	11

== Group stage ==
=== Group 1 ===
Name	Pld	MW	ML	GW	GL	Pts
Yang Qian (AUS)	3	3	0	9	1	6
Faith Obazuaye (NGR)	3	2	1	7	3	5
Gloria Gracia Wong Sze (MAS)	3	1	2	3	8	4
Baby Sahana Ravi (IND)	3	0	3	2	9	3

Date	Time	Player 1	Score	Player 2	Set 1	Set 2	Set 3	Set 4	Set 5
3 August	10:40	Yang Qian (AUS)	3–0	Gloria Gracia Wong Sze (MAS)	11–3	11–4	11–5		
3 August	10:40	Faith Obazuaye (NGR)	3–0	Baby Sahana Ravi (IND)	11–9	11–8	11–6		
3 August	17:10	Yang Qian (AUS)	3–1	Faith Obazuaye (NGR)	6–11	11–6	11–8	11–8	
3 August	17:10	Gloria Gracia Wong Sze (MAS)	3–2	Baby Sahana Ravi (IND)	8–11	7–11	11–5	11–8	11–9
4 August	11:15	Yang Qian (AUS)	3–0	Baby Sahana Ravi (IND)	11–4	11–4	11–4		
4 August	11:15	Faith Obazuaye (NGR)	3–0	Gloria Gracia Wong Sze (MAS)	11–7	11–8	11–9		

=== Group 2 ===
Name	Pld	MW	ML	GW	GL	Pts
Lei Lina (AUS)	3	3	0	9	0	6
Felicity Pickard (ENG)	3	2	1	6	4	5
Grace Williams (WAL)	3	1	2	4	6	4
Noela Olo (SOL)	3	0	3	0	9	3

Date	Time	Player 1	Score	Player 2	Set 1	Set 2	Set 3	Set 4	Set 5
3 August	10:40	Lei Lina (AUS)	3–0	Grace Williams (WAL)	11–3	11–2	11–1		
3 August	10:40	Felicity Pickard (ENG)	3–0	Noela Olo (SOL)	11–2	11–2	11–4		
3 August	17:10	Lei Lina (AUS)	3–0	Felicity Pickard (ENG)	11–1	11–3	11–2		
3 August	17:10	Grace Williams (WAL)	3–0	Noela Olo (SOL)	11–4	11–7	11–5		
4 August	11:50	Lei Lina (AUS)	3–0	Noela Olo (SOL)	11–1	11–1	11–1		
4 August	11:50	Felicity Pickard (ENG)	3–1	Grace Williams (WAL)	11–6	10–12	11–9	11–9	
