= Athletics at the 2022 Commonwealth Games – Women's shot put (F57) =

Women's shot put (F57) at the 2022 Commonwealth Games
- Venue: Alexander Stadium
- Dates: 6 August
- Competitors: 9 from 7 nations
- Winning distance: 10.03 m

Medalists
gold medal	Eucharia Iyiazi	Nigeria
silver medal	Arlette Mawe Fokoa	Cameroon
bronze medal	Ugochi Alam	Nigeria

The women's shot put (F57) at the 2022 Commonwealth Games, as part of the athletics programme, took place in the Alexander Stadium on 6 August 2022.

== Records ==
Prior to this competition, the existing world and Games records were as follows:

Records F55
World record	Marianne Buggenhagen (GER)	9.06 m	Athens, Greece	19 September 2004
Records F56
World record	Nadia Medjmedj (ALG)	9.95 m	Sharjah, United Arab Emirates	14 February 2019
Records F57
World record	Safia Djelal (ALG)	11.56 m	Dubai, United Arab Emirates	21 March 2022

== Schedule ==
The schedule was as follows:

Date	Time	Round
Saturday 6 August 2022	10:20	Final

All times are British Summer Time (UTC+1)

== Results ==
=== Final ===
The medals were determined in the final.

Rank	Name	Sport class	#1	#2	#3	#4	#5	#6	Result	Notes
1st place, gold medalist(s)	Eucharia Iyiazi (NGR)	F57	x	x	9.54	9.65	10.03	x	10.03	GR, SB
2nd place, silver medalist(s)	Arlette Mawe Fokoa (CMR)	F57	9.11	8.72	9.38	9.31	9.13	9.03	9.38	PB
3rd place, bronze medalist(s)	Ugochi Alam (NGR)	F57	9.25	9.20	8.17	9.30	x	8.51	9.30	
4	Sharmila (IND)	F57	8.20	7.54	8.43	8.26	8.25	8.29	8.43	PB
5	Sarah Mickey (CAN)	F55	6.85	7.21	7.71	6.99	7.31	7.54	7.71	GR, PB
6	Elie Enock (VAN)	F57	7.43	7.42	7.30	7.70	7.37	7.56	7.70	AR
7	Poonam Sharma (IND)	F56	7.07	7.04	6.82	6.94	6.84	6.99	7.07	GR, PB
8	Santosh (IND)	F57	6.44	6.26	6.34	6.53	6.20	5.77	6.53	
9	Julie Charlton (AUS)	F57	6.05	6.10	6.20	5.89	6.14	6.26	6.26	
