= Weightlifting at the 2022 Commonwealth Games – Men's 61 kg =

Weightlifting – Men's 61 kg at the 2022 Commonwealth Games
- Venue: National Exhibition Centre
- Dates: 30 July
- Competitors: 9 from 9 nations
- Winning total: 285 kg

Medalists
gold medal	Muhamad Aznil Bidin	Malaysia
silver medal	Morea Baru	Papua New Guinea
bronze medal	Gururaja Poojary	India

The Men's 61 kg weightlifting event at the 2022 Commonwealth Games took place at the National Exhibition Centre on 30 July 2022. The weightlifter from Malaysia won the gold, with a combined lift of 285 kg.

== Records ==
Prior to this competition, the existing world, Commonwealth and Games records were as follows:
When the previous records and weight classes were discarded following readjustment, the IWF defined "world standards" as the minimum lifts needed to qualify as world records (WR), CommonWealth Authority defined "Commonwealth standards" and "Commonwealth games standards" as the minimum lifts needed to qualify as Commonwealth record (CR) and Commonwealth games record (GR) in the new weight classes. Wherever World Standard/Commonwealth Standard/Commonwealth Games Standard appear in the list below, no qualified weightlifter has yet lifted the benchmark weights in a sanctioned competition.

World record	Snatch	Li Fabin (CHN)	145 kg	Pattaya, Thailand	19 September 2019
World record	Clean & Jerk	Eko Yuli Irawan (INA)	174 kg	Ashgabat, Turkmenistan	3 November 2018
World record	Total	Li Fabin (CHN)	318 kg	Pattaya, Thailand	19 September 2019
Commonwealth record	Snatch	Aznil Bidin (MAS)	128 kg	Tashkent, Uzbekistan	9 February 2020
Commonwealth record	Clean & Jerk	Morea Baru (PNG)	163 kg	Darwin, Australia	27 Apr 2019
Commonwealth record	Total	Aznil Bidin (MAS)	287 kg	Hanoi, Vietnam	20 May 2022
Games record	Snatch	Commonwealth Games Standard	123 kg		
Games record	Clean & Jerk	Commonwealth Games Standard	152 kg		
Games record	Total	Commonwealth Games Standard	272 kg		

The following records were established during the competition:

Snatch	127 kg	Muhamad Aznil Bidin (MAS)	GR
Clean & Jerk	158 kg	Muhamad Aznil Bidin (MAS)	GR
Total	285 kg	Muhamad Aznil Bidin (MAS)	GR

== Schedule ==
All times are British Summer Time (UTC+1)

Date	Time	Round
Saturday 30 July 2022	11:45	Final

== Results ==
Rank	Athlete	Body weight (kg)	Snatch (kg)				Clean & Jerk (kg)				Total
Rank	Athlete	Body weight (kg)	1	2	3	Result	1	2	3	Result	Total
1st place, gold medalist(s)	Muhamad Aznil Bidin (MAS)	60.93	123	127	~~130~~	127 GR	153	158	~~165~~	158 GR	285 GR
2nd place, silver medalist(s)	Morea Baru (PNG)	61.00	114	118	121	121	152	~~165~~	~~165~~	152	273
3rd place, bronze medalist(s)	Gururaja Poojary (IND)	60.94	115	118	~~120~~	118	144	148	151	151	269
4	Youri Simard (CAN)	61.00	110	115	119	119	140	145	149	149	268
5	Emmanuel Appah (NGR)	60.66	110	~~115~~	~~117~~	110	135	~~140~~	~~140~~	135	245
6	Nashrul Haji Abu Bakar (BRU)	60.65	95	~~100~~	~~100~~	95	123	127	132	132	227
7	Shadrach Cain (NRU)	59.82	85	~~90~~	90	90	110	116	~~120~~	116	206
8	Nkhahle Sebota (LES)	59.91	80	~~87~~	~~90~~	80	106	~~112~~	~~115~~	106	186
―	Thilanka Palangasinghe (SRI)	61.00	100	~~105~~	―	100	―	―	―	―	DNF
