= Table tennis at the 2022 Commonwealth Games – Women's singles C3–5 =

Table tennis – Women's singles C3–5 at the 2022 Commonwealth Games
- Venue: National Exhibition Centre
- Dates: 3 - 6 August 2022
- Competitors: 8 from 5 nations

Medalists
gold medal	Bhavina Patel	India
silver medal	Ifechukwude Ikpeoyi	Nigeria
bronze medal	Sonalben Patel	India

Table tennis women's singles C3–5 at the 2022 Commonwealth Games is held at the National Exhibition Centre at Birmingham, England from 3 to 6 August 2022.

== Finals ==
Semifinals
Bhavina Patel (IND)	11	11	11
Sue Bailey (ENG)	6	6	6
Ifechukwude Ikpeoyi (NGR)	8	11	11	11
Sonalben Patel (IND)	11	6	4	7

Gold medal match
Bhavina Patel (IND)	12	11	11
Ifechukwude Ikpeoyi (NGR)	10	2	9
Bronze medal match
Sue Bailey (ENG)	5	2	3
Sonalben Patel (IND)	11	11	11

== Group stage ==
=== Group 1 ===
Name	Pld	MW	ML	GW	GL	Pts
Bhavina Patel (IND)	3	3	0	9	1	6
Ifechukwude Ikpeoyi (NGR)	3	2	1	6	4	5
Daniela Di Toro (AUS)	3	1	2	5	6	4
Akanisi Latu (FIJ)	3	0	3	0	9	3

Date	Time	Player 1	Score	Player 2	Set 1	Set 2	Set 3	Set 4	Set 5
3 August	10:40	Bhavina Patel (IND)	3–1	Daniela Di Toro (AUS)	8–11	11–4	11–7	11–9	
3 August	10:40	Ifechukwude Ikpeoyi (NGR)	3–0	Akanisi Latu (FIJ)	11–2	11–3	11–7		
3 August	17:45	Bhavina Patel (IND)	3–0	Ifechukwude Ikpeoyi (NGR)	11–3	11–7	11–6		
3 August	17:45	Daniela Di Toro (AUS)	3–0	Akanisi Latu (FIJ)	11–2	11–6	11–4		
4 August	11:15	Bhavina Patel (IND)	3–0	Akanisi Latu (FIJ)	11–1	11–5	11–1		
4 August	11:15	Ifechukwude Ikpeoyi (NGR)	3–1	Daniela Di Toro (AUS)	11–3	14–16	11–1	11–4	

=== Group 2 ===
Name	Pld	MW	ML	GW	GL	Pts
Sonalben Patel (IND)	3	3	0	9	2	6
Sue Bailey (ENG)	3	2	1	7	5	5
Chinenye Obiora (NGR)	3	1	2	6	6	4
Amanda Tscharke (AUS)	3	0	3	0	9	3

Date	Time	Player 1	Score	Player 2	Set 1	Set 2	Set 3	Set 4	Set 5
3 August	10:40	Sue Bailey (ENG)	1–3	Sonalben Patel (IND)	7–11	5–11	11–6	7–11	
3 August	10:40	Chinenye Obiora (NGR)	3–0	Amanda Tscharke (AUS)	11–8	11–5			
3 August	17:45	Sue Bailey (ENG)	3–2	Chinenye Obiora (NGR)	11–6	8–11	9–11	11–8	11–3
3 August	17:45	Sonalben Patel (IND)	3–0	Amanda Tscharke (AUS)	11–2	11–8			
4 August	11:50	Sue Bailey (ENG)	3–0	Amanda Tscharke (AUS)	11–2	11–2	11–4		
4 August	11:50	Chinenye Obiora (NGR)	1–3	Sonalben Patel (IND)	11–8	5–11	7–11	5–11	
