= Table tennis at the 2022 Commonwealth Games – Men's singles C3–5 =

Table tennis – Men's singles C3–5 at the 2022 Commonwealth Games
- Venue: National Exhibition Centre
- Dates: 3 - 6 August 2022
- Competitors: 8 from 6 nations

Medalists
gold medal	Jack Hunter-Spivey	England
silver medal	Nasiru Sule	Nigeria
bronze medal	Isau Ogunkunle	Nigeria

Table tennis men's singles C3–5 at the 2022 Commonwealth Games is held at the National Exhibition Centre at Birmingham, England from 3 to 6 August 2022.

== Finals ==
Semifinals
Nasiru Sule (NGR)	7	11	11	11
Raj Alagar (IND)	11	8	4	7
Jack Hunter-Spivey (ENG)	11	13	11
Isau Ogunkunle (NGR)	4	11	9

Gold medal match
Nasiru Sule (NGR)	4	11	6	7
Jack Hunter-Spivey (ENG)	11	9	11	11
Bronze medal match
Raj Alagar (IND)	3	6	8
Isau Ogunkunle (NGR)	11	11	11

== Group stage ==
=== Group 1 ===
Name	Pld	MW	ML	GW	GL	Pts
Nasiru Sule (NGR)	3	3	0	9	2	6
Jack Hunter-Spivey (ENG)	3	2	1	8	3	5
Muhammad Mudassar (CAN)	3	1	2	3	8	4
Junjian Chen (AUS)	3	0	3	2	9	3

Date	Time	Player 1	Score	Player 2	Set 1	Set 2	Set 3	Set 4	Set 5
3 August	12:25	Jack Hunter-Spivey (ENG)	3–0	Junjian Chen (AUS)	11–7	11–5	11–9		
3 August	12:25	Nasiru Sule (NGR)	3–0	Muhammad Mudassar (CAN)	11–2	11–5	11–4		
3 August	19:30	Jack Hunter-Spivey (ENG)	2–3	Nasiru Sule (NGR)	11–9	10–12	7–11	11–9	9–11
3 August	19:30	Junjian Chen (AUS)	2–3	Muhammad Mudassar (CAN)	11–7	16–14	9–11	5–11	9–11
4 August	12:25	Jack Hunter-Spivey (ENG)	3–0	Muhammad Mudassar (CAN)	11–0	11–5	11–8		
4 August	12:25	Nasiru Sule (NGR)	3–0	Junjian Chen (AUS)	11–4	11–3	11–4		

=== Group 2 ===
Name	Pld	MW	ML	GW	GL	Pts
Isau Ogunkunle (NGR)	3	3	0	9	1	6
Raj Alagar (IND)	3	2	1	7	6	5
Dan Bullen (ENG)	3	1	2	4	7	4
George Wyndham (SLE)	3	0	3	3	9	3

Date	Time	Player 1	Score	Player 2	Set 1	Set 2	Set 3	Set 4	Set 5
3 August	12:25	Isau Ogunkunle (NGR)	3–0	Dan Bullen (ENG)	11–7	11–5	11–9		
3 August	12:25	Raj Alagar (IND)	3–2	George Wyndham (SLE)	9–11	11–8	11–0	10–12	11–3
3 August	19:30	Isau Ogunkunle (NGR)	3–1	Raj Alagar (IND)	11–9	4–11	11–6	11–8	
3 August	19:30	Dan Bullen (ENG)	3–1	George Wyndham (SLE)	14–12	7–11	11–5	11–9	
4 August	13:00	Isau Ogunkunle (NGR)	3–0	George Wyndham (SLE)	11–4	11–5	11–9		
4 August	13:00	Raj Alagar (IND)	3–1	Dan Bullen (ENG)	11–5	11–2	9–11	11–2	
