= Wrestling at the 2022 Commonwealth Games – Women's freestyle 57 kg =

Wrestling competition

Wrestling – Women's freestyle 57 kg at the 2022 Commonwealth Games
- Venue: Coventry Arena
- Dates: 5 August 2022
- Competitors: 11 from 11 nations

Medalists
gold medal	Odunayo Adekuoroye	Nigeria
silver medal	Anshu Malik	India
bronze medal	Hannah Taylor	Canada
bronze medal	Nethmi Poruthotage	Sri Lanka

The Women's freestyle 57 kg wrestling competitions at the 2022 Commonwealth Games in Birmingham, England took place on 5 August at the Coventry Arena. A total of 11 competitors from 11 nations took part.

This freestyle wrestling competition consists of a single-elimination tournament, with a repechage used to determine the winner of two bronze medals. The two finalists face off for gold and silver medals. Each wrestler who loses to one of the two finalists moves into the repechage, culminating in a pair of bronze medal matches featuring the semifinal losers each facing the remaining repechage opponent from their half of the bracket.

== Results ==
The draw is as follows:

Legend

- F — Won by fall
- WO — Won by walkover

=== Main bracket ===
Round of 16
Shannon Harry (WAL)	12
Irene Symeonidis (AUS)	12^{F}
Odunayo Adekuoroye (NGR)	2^{F}
Veronica Ayo (UGA)	0
Danielle Lim (SGP)	6^{F}
Zainab Barrie (SLE)	0

Quarterfinals
Anshu Malik (IND)	10
Irene Symeonidis (AUS)	0
Nethmi Poruthotage (SRI)	WO
~~Joseph Essombe (CMR)~~
Sophia Ayieta (KEN)	0
Odunayo Adekuoroye (NGR)	10
Danielle Lim (SGP)	0
Hannah Taylor (CAN)	10

Semifinals
Anshu Malik (IND)	10
Nethmi Poruthotage (SRI)	0
Odunayo Adekuoroye (NGR)	10
Hannah Taylor (CAN)	0

Final
Anshu Malik (IND)	3
Odunayo Adekuoroye (NGR)	7

=== Repechage ===
Repechage round
Veronica Ayo (UGA)	0
Sophia Ayieta (KEN)	11

Bronze medal match
Irene Symeonidis (AUS)	0
Nethmi Poruthotage (SRI)	10
Sophia Ayieta (KEN)	0
Hannah Taylor (CAN)	4^{F}
