= Sierra Leone at the 2022 Commonwealth Games =

- Flag of Sierra Leone
- CG code: SLE
- CGA: National Olympic Committee of Sierra Leone
- Website: facebook.com/nocsle (Facebook)

in Birmingham, England 28 July 2022 – 8 August 2022
- Competitors: 27 (17 men and 10 women) in 7 sports
- Flag bearers: Joshua Wyse; Hafsatu Kamara
- Medals: Gold 0 Silver 0 Bronze 0 Total 0

Commonwealth Games appearances (overview)
- 1958; 1962; 1966; 1970; 1974; 1978; 1982–1986; 1990; 1994; 1998; 2002; 2006; 2010; 2014; 2018; 2022; 2026; 2030

Sierra Leone competed at the 2022 Commonwealth Games held in Birmingham, England. This was Sierra Leone's 13th appearance at the Commonwealth Games.

Joshua Wyse and Hafsatu Kamara served as the country's opening ceremony flagbearers.

== Competitors ==
The following is the list of number of competitors participating at the Games per sport/discipline.

Sport	Men	Women	Total
Athletics	4	4	8
Badminton	2	0	2
Boxing	2	2	4
Judo	2	0	2
Swimming	2	2	4
Table tennis	1	0	1
Wrestling	3	2	5
Total	16	10	26

== Athletics ==
Men
Track and road events

Athlete	Event	Heat		Semifinal		Final	
Athlete	Event	Result	Rank	Result	Rank	Result	Rank
Karim Bangura	100 m	10.51	5	did not advance			
Julius Morie	100 m	10.88	7	did not advance			
Karim Bangura	200 m	21.28	4 q	21.62	8	did not advance	
Alford Conteh	400 m	47.12	5	did not advance			
Va-Sheku Sheriff	400 m	51.10	7	did not advance			

Women
Track and road events

Athlete	Event	Heat		Semifinal		Final	
Athlete	Event	Result	Rank	Result	Rank	Result	Rank
Hafsatu Kamara	100 m	11.80	4	did not advance			
Jenifer Bangura	100 m	12.00	5	did not advance			
Hafsatu Kamara	200 m	25.05	5	did not advance			
Kadiatu Kanu	200 m	24.76	6	did not advance			
Mary Thomas Tarawally	400 m	58.18	8	did not advance			

== Badminton ==
Athlete	Event	Round of 64	Round of 32	Round of 16	Quarterfinal	Semifinal	Final / BM	
Athlete	Event	Opposition Score	Opposition Score	Opposition Score	Opposition Score	Opposition Score	Opposition Score	Rank
Abdul Bangura	Men's singles	Abdul-Samad (GHA); L 0 - 2	did not advance					
Ibrahim Conteh	Men's singles	Bye	Nibal (MDV); L 0 - 2	did not advance				

== Boxing ==
Athlete	Event	Round of 32	Round of 16	Quarterfinals	Semifinals	Final	
Athlete	Event	Opposition Result	Opposition Result	Opposition Result	Opposition Result	Opposition Result	Rank
John Browne	Men's Light welterweight	Bye	Ryan (ANT); L 0 - 5	did not advance			
Yusufu Deen Kargbo	Men's Welterweight	Bye	Mbewe (MAW); L 1 - 4	did not advance			
Sara Haghighat-Joo	Women's Light flyweight	—N/a	Bye	Nakimuli (UGA); L WO	did not advance		
Zainab Keita	Women's Light middleweight	—N/a	Bye	Scott (AUS); L 0 - 5	did not advance		

== Judo ==
A squad of two judoka was entered as of 7 July 2022.

Men

Athlete	Event	Round of 32	Round of 16	Quarterfinals	Semifinals	Repechage	Final/BM	
Athlete	Event	Opposition Result	Opposition Result	Opposition Result	Opposition Result	Opposition Result	Opposition Result	Rank
Alfred Bangura	-60 kg	Iddris (GHA); L 01 - 10	did not advance					17
Kenny Williams	-60 kg	Christodoulides (CYP); L 00 - 10	did not advance					17

== Swimming ==
Men

Athlete	Event	Heat		Semifinal		Final	
Athlete	Event	Time	Rank	Time	Rank	Time	Rank
Mohamed Kamara	50 m freestyle	27.69	67	did not advance			
Mohamed Kamara	50 m breaststroke	36.22	40	did not advance			
Joshua Wyse	50 m freestyle	27.40	64	did not advance			
Joshua Wyse	50 m butterfly	29.71	52	did not advance			

Women

Athlete	Event	Heat		Semifinal		Final	
Athlete	Event	Time	Rank	Time	Rank	Time	Rank
Tity Dumbuya	50 m freestyle	31.27	66	did not advance			
Tity Dumbuya	50 m butterfly	34.17	51	did not advance			
Kanu Isha	50 m backstroke	44.57	38	did not advance			
Kanu Isha	50 m breaststroke	48.66	33	did not advance			

== Table tennis ==
Sierra Leone was awarded a bipartite quota in the men's C3–5 event in para-table tennis.

Parasport

Athletes	Event	Group Stage				Semifinal	Final	Rank
Athletes	Event	Opposition Score	Opposition Score	Opposition Score	Rank	Opposition Score	Opposition Score	Rank
George Wyndham	Men's singles C3–5	Alagar (IND); L 2 - 3	Bullen (ENG); L 1 - 3	Ogunkunle (NGR); L 0 - 3	4	did not advance		

== Wrestling ==
Key:

- VT - Victory by Fall.
- PP - Decision by Points - the loser with technical points.
- PO - Decision by Points - the loser without technical points.

Repechage Format

Athlete	Event	Round of 16	Quarterfinal	Semifinal	Repechage	Final / BM	
Athlete	Event	Opposition Result	Opposition Result	Opposition Result	Opposition Result	Opposition Result	Rank
Mohamed Sesay	Men's -74 kg	Ntuyo (UGA); W 10 - 0	Hawkins (NZL); L 3 - 9	did not advance			7
Sheku Kassegbama	Men's -86 kg	Hawladar (BAN); W 4 - 0	Punia (IND); L 0 - 10	Did not advance	Oxenham (NZL); L 1 - 3	Did not advance	7
Mohamed Bundu	Men's -125 kg	Bye	Kooner (ENG); L 1 - 4	did not advance			9
Zainab Barrie	Women's -57 kg	Lim (SGP); L 0 - 6	did not advance				9
Madusu Koroma	Women's -76 kg	—N/a	Ruben (NGR); L 0 - 10	Did not advance	—N/a	Nelthrope (ENG); L 0 - 4	5
