= Wrestling at the 2022 Commonwealth Games – Men's freestyle 86 kg =

Wrestling competition

Wrestling – Men's freestyle 86 kg at the 2022 Commonwealth Games
- Venue: Coventry Arena
- Dates: 5 August 2022
- Competitors: 16 from 16 nations

Medalists
gold medal	Deepak Punia	India
silver medal	Muhammad Inam	Pakistan
bronze medal	Alex Moore	Canada
bronze medal	Jayden Lawrence	Australia

The Men's freestyle 86 kg wrestling competitions at the 2022 Commonwealth Games in Birmingham, England took place on 5 August at the Coventry Arena. A total of 16 competitors from 16 nations took part.

This freestyle wrestling competition consists of a single-elimination tournament, with a repechage used to determine the winner of two bronze medals. The two finalists face off for gold and silver medals. Each wrestler who loses to one of the two finalists moves into the repechage, culminating in a pair of bronze medal matches featuring the semifinal losers each facing the remaining repechage opponent from their half of the bracket.

== Results ==
The draw is as follows:

Legend

- F — Won by fall

=== Main bracket ===
Round of 16
Matthew Oxenham (NZL)	0
Deepak Punia (IND)	10
Sheku Kassegbama (SLE)	4^{F}
Abdur Hawladar (BAN)	0
Alex Moore (CAN)	10
Ekerekeme Agiomor (NGR)	0
Suresh Fernando (SRI)	2^{F}
Jean Marianne (MRI)	0
Edward Lessing (RSA)	10
Taitaifono Tamati (SAM)	0
Charalampos Choiras (CYP)	4
Syerus Eslami (ENG)	6
Gary Chow (SGP)	0
Jayden Lawrence (AUS)	10
Kieran Malone (SCO)	0
Muhammad Inam (PAK)	11

Quarterfinals
Deepak Punia (IND)	10
Sheku Kassegbama (SLE)	0
Alex Moore (CAN)	10
Suresh Fernando (SRI)	0
Edward Lessing (RSA)	10
Syerus Eslami (ENG)	0
Jayden Lawrence (AUS)	3
Muhammad Inam (PAK)	8

Semifinals
Deepak Punia (IND)	3
Alex Moore (CAN)	1
Edward Lessing (RSA)	3
Muhammad Inam (PAK)	5

Final
Deepak Punia (IND)	3
Muhammad Inam (PAK)	0

=== Repechage ===
Repechage round
Matthew Oxenham (NZL)	3
Sheku Kassegbama (SLE)	1
Keiran Malone (SCO)	0
Jayden Lawrence (AUS)	10

Bronze medal match
Matthew Oxenham (NZL)	0
Alex Moore (CAN)	10
Jayden Lawrence (AUS)	12
Edward Lessing (RSA)	11
