= Athletics at the 2022 Commonwealth Games – Women's long jump =

Women's long jump at the 2022 Commonwealth Games
- Venue: Alexander Stadium
- Dates: 5 August (qualification); 7 August (final)
- Competitors: 18 from 14 nations
- Winning distance: 7.00

Medalists
gold medal	Ese Brume	Nigeria
silver medal	Brooke Buschkuehl	Australia
bronze medal	Deborah Acquah	Ghana

The women's long jump at the 2022 Commonwealth Games, as part of the athletics programme, took place in the Alexander Stadium on 5 and 7 August 2022.

== Records ==
Prior to this competition, the existing world and Games records were as follows:

World record	Galina Chistyakova (URS)	7.52 m	Leningrad, Soviet Union	11 June 1988
Commonwealth record	Ese Brume (NGR)	7.17 m	Chula Vista, United States	29 May 2021
Games record	Bronwyn Thompson (AUS)	6.97 m	Melbourne, Australia	24 March 2006

== Schedule ==
The schedule was as follows:

Date	Time	Round
Friday 5 August 2022	11:40	Qualification
Sunday 7 August 2022	19:05	Final

All times are British Summer Time (UTC+1)

== Results ==
=== Qualification ===
Qualifying performance 6.75 (Q) or at least 12 best performers (q) advance to the Final

Rank	Group	Name	#1	#2	#3	Result	Notes
1	B	Deborah Acquah (GHA)	6.85			6.85	Q
2	A	Brooke Buschkuehl (AUS)	6.63	6.84 w		6.84 w	Q
3	B	Ese Brume (NGR)	6.63	6.81		6.81	Q
4	B	Jazmin Sawyers (ENG)	x	6.53	6.80 w	6.80 w	Q
5	A	Lorraine Ugen (ENG)	x	6.79'		6.79	Q
6	B	Filippa Fotopoulou (CYP)	6.55 w	6.33 w	6.59	6.59	q
7	B	Abigail Irozuru (ENG)	x	x	6.59	6.59	q, SB
7	A	Ruth Usoro (NGR)	x	6.59		6.59	q
9	A	Christabel Nettey (CAN)	6.45 w	6.19	x	6.45 w	q
10	B	Sarangi Silva (SRI)	6.42 w	6.20	x	6.42 w	q
11	A	Ackelia Smith (JAM)	6.35 w	6.29	6.22 w	6.35 w	q
12	B	Samantha Dale (AUS)	x	6.35	6.02	6.35	q
13	A	Tyra Gittens (TTO)	6.18 w	x	6.28	6.28	qR
14	A	Ancy Sojan (IND)	6.17 w	6.25 w	x	6.25 w	
15	A	Rellie Kaputin (PNG)	x	5.87	5.95	5.95	SB
16	B	Claire Azzopardi (MLT)	5.75	x	5.76 w	5.76 w	
17	B	Ashantie Carr (BIZ)	x	5.54	5.04	5.54	PB
	A	Mariah Toussaint (DMA)	x	x	x	NM	

=== Final ===
The medals were determined in the final.

Rank	Name	#1	#2	#3	#4	#5	#6	Result	Notes
1st place, gold medalist(s)	Ese Brume (NGR)	x	6.99	6.81	6.99	6.96	7.00	7.00	GR
2nd place, silver medalist(s)	Brooke Buschkuehl (AUS)	6.88	6.87	6.92	x	6.95	x	6.95	
3rd place, bronze medalist(s)	Deborah Acquah (GHA)	6.94	x	–	6.79	6.45	6.68	6.94	NR
4	Jazmin Sawyers (ENG)	6.84	5.06	6.54	6.84	6.78	6.71	6.84	SB
5	Lorraine Ugen (ENG)	x	x	6.60	x	x	x	6.60	
6	Ruth Usoro (NGR)	6.56	x	x	3.43	6.01	x	6.56	
7	Ackelia Smith (JAM)	6.55	6.42	x	6.32	6.26	6.01	6.55	
8	Filippa Fotopoulou (CYP)	6.47	6.27	x	x	6.18	6.04	6.47	
9	Christabel Nettey (CAN)	6.41	6.36	6.30				6.41	
10	Samantha Dale (AUS)	6.02	x	6.32				6.32	
11	Tyra Gittens (TTO)	6.27	6.17	6.03				6.27	
12	Abigail Irozuru (ENG)	x	5.89	6.19				6.19	
13	Sarangi Silva (SRI)	x	6.00	6.07				6.07	
