= Boxing at the 2022 Commonwealth Games – Women's lightweight =

Boxing competitions

Boxing – Women's lightweight at the 2022 Commonwealth Games
- Venue: National Exhibition Centre Hall 4
- Dates: 1 – 7 August 2022
- Competitors: 9 from 9 nations

Medalists
gold medal	Amy Broadhurst	Northern Ireland
silver medal	Gemma Richardson	England
bronze medal	Jaismine Lamboria	India
bronze medal	Cynthia Ogunsemilore	Nigeria

The Women's lightweight boxing competitions at the 2022 Commonwealth Games in Birmingham, England took place between 1 and August 7 at National Exhibition Centre Hall 4. Lightweights were limited to those boxers weighing between 57 and 60 kilograms.

Like all Commonwealth boxing events, the competition was a straight single-elimination tournament. Both semifinal losers were awarded bronze medals, so no boxers competed again after their first loss. Bouts consisted of three rounds of three minutes each, with one-minute breaks between rounds.

== Schedule ==
The schedule is as follows:

Date	Round
Monday 1 August	Preliminaries
Thursday 4 August	Quarter-finals
Saturday 6 August	Semi-finals
Sunday 7 August 2022	Final

== Results ==
The draw is as follows:

=== Bracket ===
Preliminaries
Gemma Richardson (ENG)	5
Megan Reid (SCO)	0

Quarterfinals
Jade Burden (IOM)	0
Gemma Richardson (ENG)	5
Troy Garton (NZL)	1
Jaismine Lamboria (IND)	4
Felistus Nkandu (ZAM)
Amy Broadhurst (NIR)	RSC
Aratwa Kasemang (BOT)
Cynthia Ogunsemilore (NGR)	RSC

Semifinals
Gemma Richardson (ENG)	3
Jaismine Lamboria (IND)	2
Amy Broadhurst (NIR)	5
Cynthia Ogunsemilore (NGR)	0

Final
Gemma Richardson (ENG)	0
Amy Broadhurst (NIR)	5
