= Ugochi Alam =

Nigerian para-athlete

Medal record

Women's para-athletics

Representing Nigeria

Commonwealth Games
Bronze medal – third place	2022 Birmingham	Shot put - F57

Ugochi Constance Alam (born 4 May 1988) is a Paralympian athlete from Nigeria competing mainly in category F57/58 shot put and discus throw events.

Alam competed in the 2022 Commonwealth Games and placed third, winning the bronze medal in the women's shot put F57/F58 event.
