= Nasiru Sule =

Nigerian para table tennis player

Personal information
- Nationality: Nigerian
- Born: 4 December 1967 (age 58)

Sport
- Country: Nigeria
- Sport: Table Tennis
Medal record
Commonwealth Games
Silver medal – second place	2022 England	Men's singles C3-5

Nasiru Sule (born 4 December 1967) is a Nigerian table tennis player.

He competed for Nigeria at local and international table tennis competitions. Sule participated in the male para table tennis competition at the 2022 Commonwealth Games representing Nigeria.

== Achievements ==
Sule took part in the 2022 Commonwealth Games Table Tennis Mens single classes C3-5, where he was beaten by Jack Hunter-Spivey to settle for silver medal.

Sule also competed in the 1992 Summer Paralympics in Barcelona representing Nigeria.

Sule also featured for Nigeria at the Atlanta 1996, Sydney 2000 and Beijing 2008 competitions respectively.

== See also ==
- Nigeria at the 2022 Commonwealth Games
- Nigeria at the Paralympics
- Nigeria at the 1992 Summer Paralympics
