= Nethmi Ahinsa =

Sri Lankan freestyle wrestler

Personal information
- Full name: Nethmi Ahinsa Fernando Poruthotage
- Born: 17 June 2004 (age 22) Welpalla, Sri Lanka
- Height: 1.55 m (5 ft 1 in)
Medal record
Women's freestyle wrestling
Representing Sri Lanka
Commonwealth Games
Bronze medal – third place	2022 Birmingham	57kg
U23 Asian Championships
Bronze medal – third place	2025 Vung Tau	57kg
U20 World Championships
Bronze medal – third place	2024 Pontevedra	53kg
U20 Asian Championships
Bronze medal – third place	2024 Sriracha	53kg

Nethmi Ahinsa Fernando Poruthotage (born 17 June 2004) is a Sri Lankan freestyle wrestler. She won a bronze medal in the women's 57 kg event at the 2022 Commonwealth Games, becoming Sri Lanka's first-ever medalist in wrestling and the youngest Sri Lankan to win a medal at the Games.

== Career ==
- 2022: At the 2022 Commonwealth Games, she won the bronze medal in the 57 kg freestyle event, becoming Sri Lanka’s first-ever wrestling medallist at the Commonwealth Games and the youngest Sri Lankan to win a medal at the Games.
- 2023: Nethmi competed in the 53 kg freestyle event at the 2022 Asian Games (held in 2023), where she was eliminated in the first round.
- 2024: She competed at the 2024 Asian Wrestling Olympic Qualification Tournament hoping to qualify for the 2024 Paris Olympics.She was eliminated in her first match and she did not qualify for the Olympics. In July, she won the bronze medal in the 53 kg category at the U20 Asian Championships in Sriracha—Sri Lanka’s first-ever medal in U20 Asian Championships. In September, Poruthotage won the bronze medal at the 2024 U20 World Championships, becoming the first Sri Lankan wrestler to win a medal at any World Championships.
- 2025: In June, she won the bronze medal in the 57 kg category at the U23 Asian Championships in Vung Tau. Later in July, she attended a high-performance training camp at the Inspire Institute of Sport in India, where she trained alongside wrestling greats Kaori Icho, Blessing Oborududu, Afsoon Johnston and other international wrestlers to further develop her skills.
