= Cynthia Ogunsemilore =

Nigerian boxer (born 2002)

Personal information
- Nationality: Nigerian
- Born: Cynthia Temitayo Ogunsemilore; 14 May 2002 (age 24) Lagos, Nigeria
- Height: 1.86 m (6 ft 1 in)

Boxing career
Medal record
Women's amateur boxing
Representing Nigeria
Commonwealth Games
Bronze medal – third place	2022 Birmingham	Lightweight
African Games
Gold medal – first place	2023 Accra	Lightweight

Cynthia Temitayo Ogunsemilore (born 14 May 2002) is a Nigerian boxer. She participated in the 2022 Commonwealth Games in Lightweight, winning a bronze medal.

In the 2024 Summer Olympics, Ogunsemilore was seeded 4th in the Women's 60 kg event, but she was disqualified for failing a drug test before ever entering the ring.
