= Samantha Stewart =

Canadian freestyle wrestler (born 1989)

Personal information
- Full name: Samantha Leigh Stewart
- Born: 12 October 1989 (age 36) London, Ontario, Canada
- Height: 5 ft 2 in (157 cm)
- Weight: 53 kg (117 lb)

Sport
- Country: Canada
- Event: Freestyle
Medal record
Women's freestyle wrestling
Representing Canada
World Championships
Bronze medal – third place	2021 Oslo	53 kg
Commonwealth Games
Silver medal – second place	2022 Birmingham	53 kg
Jeux de la Francophonie
Bronze medal – third place	2017 Abidjan	53 kg
Grand Prix
Gold medal – first place	2024 Zagreb	55 kg
Gold medal – first place	2025 Tirana	57 kg
Silver medal – second place	2025 Zagreb	55 kg
Bronze medal – third place	2023 Zagreb	53 kg
Bronze medal – third place	2024 Madrid	53 kg

Samantha Leigh Stewart (born 12 October 1989) is a Canadian freestyle wrestler. She won one of the bronze medals in the women's 53 kg event at the 2021 World Wrestling Championships in Oslo, Norway. She won the silver medal in the women's 53 kg event at the 2022 Commonwealth Games held in Birmingham, England.

In 2022, Stewart won the bronze medal in her event at the Matteo Pellicone Ranking Series 2022 held in Rome, Italy. She competed in the 53 kg event at the 2022 World Wrestling Championships held in Belgrade, Serbia.

Stewart has a bachelor of recreation and sport studies, a bachelor of arts with honours in psychology, and a Master of education in counselling from the University of New Brunswick.

She has served as the executive director of Lutte New Brunswick Wrestling since 2021.

Stewart is a lesbian, and is an advocate for LGBTQ rights.

She lost to Helen Maroulis at RAF 02 on October 25, 2025, in a match that crowned the inaugural RAF Women's Flyweight Champion.
