= Ifechukwude Ikpeoyi =

Nigerian para table tennis player

Personal information
- Full name: Ifechukwude Christiana Ikpeoyi
- Nationality: Nigerian
- Born: 4 August 2002 (age 23)

Sport
- Country: Nigeria
- Sport: Table Tennis
Medal record
Commonwealth Games
Silver medal – second place	2022 England	Singles classes 3-5

Ifechukwude Christiana Ikpeoyi (born 4 August 2002) is a Nigerian para table tennis player.

She competed for Nigeria at local and international table tennis competitions. Ikpeoyi participated in the female para table tennis competition at the 2022 Commonwealth Games representing Nigeria.

== Achievements ==
Ikpeoyi is a Nigerian table tennis player. She took part in the 2022 Commonwealth Games Table Tennis Women's singles classes C3-5, where she was beaten by Bhavina Patel in straight games to settle for a silver medal.

As part of preparations for qualifiers of the Paris 2024 Paralympic games in France, Ikpeoyi was invited for the 4th Valuejet Para Table Tennis Open competition in Lagos.

== See also ==
- Nigeria at the 2022 Commonwealth Games
