= Baby Sahana Ravi =

Indian para table tennis player

Personal information
- Born: 27 June 2004 (age 22) Hosur, Tamil Nadu, India
Medal record
Women's para table tennis
Representing India
Asian Para Games
Bronze medal – third place	2026 Aichi-Nagoya	Class 9 singles
Asian Youth Para Games
Gold medal – first place	2025 Dubai	Class 9 singles

Baby Sahana Ravi (born 1994) is an Indian para table tennis player. She represented India at the 2026 Asian Para Games and won a bronze medal in the Women's class 9 singles.

== Personal life ==
Sahana hails from Hosur, Tamil Nadu. She took up table tennis in fifth class in 2014. She joined the Coronation Club and trained under her first coach, Raj Aravindan Alagar. She stopped regular schooling after ninth class and joined the National Institute of Open Schooling (NIOS). In September 2022, she joined the SDAT-AKG Table Tennis Development Centre in Chennai, where she trained under coach Muralidhar Rao. IndusInd supports her sports programme.

== Career ==
In 2024, Sahana won gold at the 2024 World Abilitysport Youth Games. In 2025, she won the title at the 2025 Asian Youth Para Games in Dubai.

In the 2026 Asian Para Games, Sahana lost to China's Mao Jingdian in the Class 9 semifinals by 8–11, 2–11, 4–11.
