= Faith Obazuaye =

Nigerian para table tennis player

Personal information
- Born: 4 March 1989 (age 37) Benin City Edo State, Nigeria
- Height: 165 cm (5 ft 5 in)
- Weight: 59 kg (130 lb)

Sport
- Country: Nigeria.
- Sport: Table Tennis
- Disability class: Class 10
- Coached by: Sunday Odebode

Achievements and titles
- Highest world ranking: 5
Medal record
Women's table tennis
Representing Nigeria
Commonwealth Games
Silver medal – second place	2018 Gold Coast	Singles TT6–10
Bronze medal – third place	2022 Birmingham	Singles C6-10

Faith Obazuaye (born 4 March 1989) is a Nigerian table tennis player. She competed for Nigeria at local and international table tennis competitions. Obazuaye participated in the para table tennis competition at the 2018 Commonwealth Games representing Nigeria.

== Table tennis ==
Obazuaye is a Nigerian class 10 table tennis player, she took part in the Women's Class 10 at the 2018 Commonwealth Games Para Table Tennis Championships in Gold Coast, Australia where she won silver medal. Obazuaye is the only Nigerian female to qualified for the 2020 Summer Paralympics after her results at the 2019 ITTF African Para Championships.

== Personal ==
Faith was born as Faith Oba-zuaye on 4 March 1989 in Benin City the capital of Edo State, Nigeria.

== Achievements ==
=== 2018 Commonwealth Games ===
Semifinals
Melissa Tapper (AUS)	6	11	11	11
Andrea McDonnell (AUS)	11	3	4	1
Felicity Pickard (ENG)	6	7	8
Faith Obazuaye (NGR)	11	11	11

Gold medal match
Melissa Tapper (AUS)	7	11	11	11
Faith Obazuaye (NGR)	11	2	6	3
Bronze medal match
Andrea McDonnell (AUS)	11	11	11
Felicity Pickard (ENG)	2	6	3
