= Isau Ogunkunle =

Nigerian para table tennis player

Personal information
- Nationality: Nigerian
- Born: 10 February 1986 (age 40) Ogun State, Nigeria

Sport
- Country: Nigeria
- Sport: Table Tennis
Medal record
Men's para table tennis
Representing Nigeria
Paralympic Games
Bronze medal – third place	2024 Paris	Singles C4
Commonwealth Games
Bronze medal – third place	2022 England	Singles C3-5

Isau Ogunkunle (born 10 February 1986) is a class four Nigerian table tennis player.

He competed for Nigeria at local and international table tennis competitions. Ogunkunle participated in the male para table tennis competition at the 2022 Commonwealth Games representing Nigeria.

== Achievements ==
Ogunkunle took part in the 2022 Commonwealth Games Table Tennis Mens single classes C3-5, where he beat Raj Aravindan Alagar 3–0 to win bronze medal.

Ogunkunle also competed in the 2020 Tokyo Paralympics in Tokyo representing Nigeria.

Ogunkunle and his counterpart Ahmed Koleosho were defeated by the French duo of Florian Merrien and Nicolas Savant in their quarter finals of the men's team class 4-5 event of the table tennis competition.

One of his major achievements was defeating African champion, Egypts Mohamed Sameh Eid in the first round at the 2019 Africa PTT Championships in Alexandria, Egypt.

== See also ==
- Nigeria at the 2022 Commonwealth Games
