= Jack Hunter-Spivey =

British para table tennis player

Personal information
- Born: 11 May 1995 (age 31) Liverpool, Great Britain
- Home town: Anfield, Great Britain

Sport
- Country: United Kingdom
- Sport: Para table tennis
- Disability: Cerebral palsy
- Disability class: C5
Medal record
Para table tennis
Representing Great Britain
Paralympic Games
Bronze medal – third place	2020 Tokyo	Individual C5
Representing England
Commonwealth Games
Gold medal – first place	2022 Birmingham	Individual C3-5

Jack Hunter-Spivey (born 11 May 1995) is a British Paralympic para table tennis player. He won gold at the 2022 Commonwealth Games in Birmingham, and bronze at the 2020 Summer Paralympics, both in the Men's individual class 5 event.

== Personal life ==
He grew up in the Anfield suburb of Liverpool and is a supporter of Liverpool F.C. He has appeared as a guest on The Anfield Wrap.
