= Sonalben Patel =

Indian Paralympic table tennis player

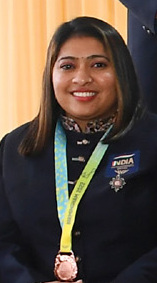
- Patel in August 2022

Personal information
- Full name: Sonalben Manubhai Patel
- Born: 15 September 1987 (age 39) Viramgam, Gujarat, India
- Spouse: Ramesh Chaudhary

Sport
- Country: India
- Sport: Athletics
- Event: Para Table Tennis C3
Medal record
Women's para table tennis
Representing India
Commonwealth Games
Bronze medal – third place	2022 Birmingham	Singles C3–5
Asian Para Games
Silver medal – second place	2018 Jakarta	Doubles WD3-5
Bronze medal – third place	2026 Aichi-Nagoya	Singles C3

Sonalben Manubhai Patel is an international Para table tennis player and Asian medalist from Viramgam, Gujarat, India.

== Career ==
She is participating in wheelchair class 3 para table tennis. She is making her Paralympic debut in Tokyo Paralympic 2020.

Ms. Lakhia from Blind People's Association, Ahmedabad encouraged her to take up Table Tennis and she soon began to train professionally under the guidance of her coach Nilay Vyas In the 2022 Birmingham Commonwealth Games, she won the bronze medal in the women's singles by defeating England's Sue Bailey.

== Personal life ==
She was diagnosed with polio when she was 6 months old, which later affected both her legs and right hand and left her with 90% disability.
