= Singapore at the 2022 Commonwealth Games =

- Flag of Singapore
- CG code: SGP
- CGA: Commonwealth Games Singapore
- Website: singaporeolympics.com

in Birmingham, England 28 July 2022 – 8 August 2022
- Competitors: 67 (33 men and 34 women) in 9 sports
- Flag bearers: Terry Hee; Nur Aini Yasli
- Medals Ranked 14th: Gold 4 Silver 4 Bronze 4 Total 12

Commonwealth Games appearances (overview)
- 1958; 1962; 1966; 1970; 1974; 1978; 1982; 1986; 1990; 1994; 1998; 2002; 2006; 2010; 2014; 2018; 2022; 2026; 2030

Singapore competed at the 2022 Commonwealth Games in Birmingham, England from 28 July to 8 August 2022. This was Singapore's seventeenth appearance at the twenty-second edition of the Games.

The Singapore team consisted of 67 athletes, 33 men and 34 women competing in 9 sports. Badminton athlete Terry Hee and powerlifter Nur Aini Yasli were the country's opening ceremony flagbearers.

== Competitors ==
Singapore received a quota of 51 open allocation slots from Commonwealth Sport. This quota is used to determine the overall team in sports lacking a qualifying system.

The following is the list of number of competitors participating at the Games per sport/discipline.

Sport	Men	Women	Total
Athletics	9	5	14
Badminton	5	5	10
Gymnastics	2	8	10
Lawn bowls	0	3	3
Para powerlifting	0	1	1
Swimming	7	4	11
Table tennis	4	4	8
Weightlifting	3	3	6
Wrestling	3	1	4
Total	33	34	67

== Medalists ==
At the closing ceremony, Feng Tianwei was awarded the David Dixon Award. This award is given to an athlete who demonstrates the highest level of performance, dedication and fair play. Feng is also the Games' most decorated Singapore athlete.

Medal	Athlete	Sport	Event	Date (based on UK time)
Gold	Feng Tianwei; Zeng Jian	Table Tennis	Women’s doubles	08 Aug
Gold	Terry Hee; Tan Wei Han	Badminton	Mixed doubles	08 Aug
Gold	Feng Tianwei	Table Tennis	Women’s singles	07 Aug
Gold	Feng Tianwei; Zeng Jian; Zhou Jingyi; Wong Xin Ru	Table Tennis	Women’s team	01 Aug
Silver	Zeng Jian	Table Tennis	Women’s singles	07 Aug
Silver	Clarence Chew; Ethan Poh; Koen Pang; Izaac Quek	Table Tennis	Men's team	02 Aug
Silver	Toh Wei Soong	Swimming	Men's 50m Freestyle S7	01 Aug
Silver	Teong Tzen Wei	Swimming	Men's 50m Butterfly	30 July
Bronze	Clarence Chew; Zeng Jian	Table Tennis	Mixed doubles	07 Aug
Bronze	Yeo Jia Min	Badminton	Women’s singles	07 Aug
Bronze	Clarence Chew; Ethan Poh	Table Tennis	Men’s doubles	07 Aug
Bronze	Loh Kean Yew; Yeo Jia Min; Jason Teh; Terry Hee; Tan Wei Han; Loh Kean Hean; Andy Kwek; Jin Yujia; Crystal Wong; Nur Insyirah Khan	Badminton	Mixed Team	02 Aug

== Athletics ==
Singapore selected fourteen athletes on 15 June 2022.

Men
Track and road events

Athlete	Event	Heat		Semifinal		Final	
Athlete	Event	Result	Rank	Result	Rank	Result	Rank
Ian Koe	100 m	10.91	7	Did not advance			
Joshua Chua	100 m	10.67	6	Did not advance			
Marc Brian Louis	100 m	10.51	4	Did not advance			
Xander Ho Ann Heng	200 m	22.37	5	Did not advance			
Reuben Rainer Lee	200 m	21.72	4	Did not advance			
Thiruben Thana Rajan	400 m	48.67	6	Did not advance			
Tan Zong Yang	400 m	47.55	6	Did not advance			
Calvin Quek	400 m hurdles	52.40	6	—N/a		Did not advance	
Marc Brian Louis; Joshua Chua; Xander Ho Ann Heng; Ian Koe	4 × 100 m relay	39.95	4 q	—N/a		40.24	7
Tan Zong Yang; Calvin Quek; Thiruben Thana Rajan; Reuben Rainer Lee	4 × 400 m relay	3:15.01	5	—N/a		Did not advance	

Field events

Athlete	Event	Final	
Athlete	Event	Distance	Rank
Kampton Kam	High jump	2.10	12

Women
Track and road events

Athlete	Event	Heat		Semifinal		Final	
Athlete	Event	Result	Rank	Result	Rank	Result	Rank
Shanti Pereira	100 m	11.48	5 Q	11.57	7	Did not advance	
Kugapriya Chandran	100 m	12.34	7	Did not advance			
Bernice Liew Yee Ling	100 m	12.12	5	Did not advance			
Shanti Pereira	200 m	23.46	4 Q	23.46	5	Did not advance	
Nur Izlyn Zaini	100 m hurdles	13.93	6	—N/a		Did not advance	
Shanti Pereira; Nur Izlyn Zaini; Kugapriya Chandran; Bernice Liew Yee Ling	4 × 100 m relay	45.58	4	—N/a		Did not advance	

Field events

Athlete	Event	Qualification		Final	
Athlete	Event	Distance	Rank	Distance	Rank
Michelle Sng	High jump	1.76	15	Did not advance	

== Badminton ==
As of 1 June 2022, Singapore qualified for the mixed team event via the BWF World Rankings. Singapore entered ten players in the Games.

Singles

Athlete	Event	Round of 64	Round of 32	Round of 16	Quarterfinal	Semifinal	Final / BM	
Athlete	Event	Opposition Score	Opposition Score	Opposition Score	Opposition Score	Opposition Score	Opposition Score	Rank
Loh Kean Yew	Men's singles	Bye	Summers (RSA); W (21–16, 21–9)	Bongout (MRI); W (21–13, 21–10)	Ng T Y (MAS); L (21-15, 14–21, 11-21)	Did not advance		
Jason Teh	Men's singles	Bye	Ali (PAK); W (21–14, 21–16)	Karunaratne (SRI); W (21–13, 21–11)	Ricketts (JAM); W (22–20, 21–10)	Sen (IND); L (10–21, 21–18, 16–21)	Kidambi (IND); L (15–21, 18–21)	4
Yeo Jia Min	Women's singles	Bye	Christodoulou (CYP); W (21–12, 21–8)	Redfearn (ENG); W (21–2, 21–11)	Chen (AUS); W (21–15, 21–15)	Sindhu (IND); L (19–21, 17–21)	Gilmour (SCO); W (21–14, 22–20)	3rd place, bronze medalist(s)
Insyirah Khan	Women's singles	Wynter (JAM); W (21–7, 21–4)	A N Abdul Razzaq (MDV); W (21–10, 21–12)	Li (CAN); L (10–21, 9–21)	Did not advance			

Doubles

Athlete	Event	Round of 64	Round of 32	Round of 16	Quarterfinal	Semifinal	Final / BM	
Athlete	Event	Opposition Score	Opposition Score	Opposition Score	Opposition Score	Opposition Score	Opposition Score	Rank
Terry Hee; Loh Kean Hean	Men's doubles	—N/a	Dong & Yakura (CAN); L (WO)	Did not advance				
Jin Yujia; Crystal Wong	Women's doubles	—N/a	Bye	Ea & Yu (AUS); W (21–12, 21–13)	Tan & Thinaah (MAS); L (15–21, 21–11, 15–21)	Did not advance		
Andy Kwek; Jin Yujia	Mixed doubles	Rasheed & A N Abdul Razzaq (MDV); W (21–3, 21–12)	Chan & Cheah (MAS); L (8–21, 13–21)	Did not advance				
Terry Hee; Tan Wei Han	Mixed doubles	Bye	K Mulenga & Siamupangila (ZAM); W (21–6, 21–4)	Grimley & Donnell (SCO); W (21–15, 21–11)	Oliver & Pak (NZL); W (21–11, 21–11)	Tan K M & Lai P J (MAS); W (25–23, 21–18)	Ellis & Smith (ENG); W (21–16, 21–15)	1st place, gold medalist(s)

Mixed team

Summary

Team	Event	Group stage				Quarterfinal	Semifinal	Final / BM	
Team	Event	Opposition Score	Opposition Score	Opposition Score	Rank	Opposition Score	Opposition Score	Opposition Score	Rank
Singapore	Mixed team	Mauritius; W 5–0	Barbados; W 5–0	England; W 4–1	1 Q	Scotland; W 3–0	India; L 0–3	England; W 3–0	3rd place, bronze medalist(s)

Squad

- Loh Kean Yew
- Jason Teh
- Loh Kean Hean
- Terry Hee
- Andy Kwek
- Yeo Jia Min
- Jin Yujia
- Tan Wei Han
- Insyirah Khan
- Crystal Wong

Group stage

Pos	Team	Pld	W	L	MF	MA	MD	GF	GA	GD	PF	PA	PD	Pts	Qualification
1	Singapore	3	3	0	14	1	+13	29	2	+27	639	301	+338	3	Knockout stage
2	England	3	2	1	11	4	+7	22	9	+13	577	367	+210	2	Knockout stage
3	Mauritius	3	1	2	4	11	−7	9	22	−13	386	583	−197	1	
4	Barbados	3	0	3	1	14	−13	2	29	−27	296	647	−351	0	

Source: BWF

Singapore
5
National Exhibition Centre, Court 2
29 July 2022, 09:00 UTC+1

Mauritius
0

			1	2	3
1	(Singapore) (Mauritius)	Andy Kwek / Tan Wei Han; Tejraj Pultoo / Kobita Dookhee	21; 8	21; 11
2	(Singapore) (Mauritius)	Yeo Jia Min; Jemimah Leung	21; 2	21; 2
3	(Singapore) (Mauritius)	Loh Kean Yew; Julien Paul	21; 10	21; 12
4	(Singapore) (Mauritius)	Crystal Wong / Jin Yujia; Kobita Dookhee / Lorna Bodha	21; 8	21; 6
5	(Singapore) (Mauritius)	Terry Hee / Loh Kean Hean; Alexandre Bongout / Tejraj Pultoo	21; 9	21; 10

Singapore
5
National Exhibition Centre, Court 3
29 July 2022, 19:00 UTC+1

Barbados
0

			1	2	3
1	(Singapore) (Barbados)	Terry Hee / Tan Wei Han; Shae Martin / Tamisha Williams	21; 5	21; 10
2	(Singapore) (Barbados)	Jason Teh; Kennie Maarten King	21; 9	21; 7
3	(Singapore) (Barbados)	Insyirah Khan; Sabrina Scott	21; 1	21; 4
4	(Singapore) (Barbados)	Loh Kean Hean / Andy Kwek; Kennie Maarten King / Shae Martin	21; 6	21; 10
5	(Singapore) (Barbados)	Crystal Wong / Jin Yujia; Tamisha Williams / Sabrina Scott	21; 5	21; 9

England
1
National Exhibition Centre, Court 1
30 July 2022, 14:00 UTC+1

Singapore
4

			1	2	3
1	(England) (Singapore)	Marcus Ellis / Lauren Smith; Terry Hee / Tan Wei Han	9; 21	15; 21
2	(England) (Singapore)	Toby Penty; Loh Kean Yew	12; 21	12; 21
3	(England) (Singapore)	Freya Patel-Redfearn; Yeo Jia Min	4; 21	8; 21
4	(England) (Singapore)	Ben Lane / Sean Vendy; Terry Hee / Loh Kean Hean	19; 21	21; 12	21; 18
5	(England) (Singapore)	Chloe Birch / Lauren Smith; Jin Yujia / Crystal Wong	19; 21	17; 21

Quarterfinals

Scotland
0
National Exhibition Centre, Court 1
31 July 2022, 17:30 UTC+1

Singapore
3

			1	2	3
1	(Scotland) (Singapore)	Adam Hall / Julie MacPherson; Terry Hee / Tan Wei Han	18; 21	17; 21
2	(Scotland) (Singapore)	Callum Smith; Loh Kean Yew	8; 21	5; 21
3	(Scotland) (Singapore)	Kirsty Gilmour; Yeo Jia Min	15; 21	21; 12	11; 21
4	(Scotland) (Singapore)	Alexander Dunn / Matthew Grimley; Terry Hee / Loh Kean Hean				not played
5	(Scotland) (Singapore)	Julie MacPherson / Ciara Torrance; Jin Yujia / Crystal Wong				not played

Semifinals

Singapore
0
National Exhibition Centre
1 August 2022, 17:30 UTC+1

India
3

			1	2	3
1	(Singapore) (India)	Terry Hee / Andy Kwek; Satwiksairaj Rankireddy / Chirag Shetty	11; 21	12; 21
2	(Singapore) (India)	Yeo Jia Min; P. V. Sindhu	11; 21	12; 21
3	(Singapore) (India)	Loh Kean Yew; Lakshya Sen	18; 21	15; 21
4	(Singapore) (India)	Crystal Wong / Jin Yujia; Gayatri Gopichand / Treesa Jolly				not played
5	(Singapore) (India)	Terry Hee / Tan Wei Han; Satwiksairaj Rankireddy / Ashwini Ponnappa				not played

Bronze medal match

England
0
National Exhibition Centre, Court 1
2 August 2022, 11:00 UTC+1

Singapore
3

			1	2	3
1	(England) (Singapore)	Ben Lane / Lauren Smith; Terry Hee / Tan Wei Han	17; 21	23; 25
2	(England) (Singapore)	Toby Penty; Loh Kean Yew	25; 23	11; 21	23; 25
3	(England) (Singapore)	Freya Patel-Redfearn; Yeo Jia Min	18; 21	14; 21
4	(England) (Singapore)	Ben Lane / Marcus Ellis; Andy Kwek / Terry Hee				not played
5	(England) (Singapore)	Chloe Birch / Lauren Smith; Crystal Wong / Jin Yujia				not played

== Gymnastics ==
A squad of ten gymnasts was announced on 28 June 2022.

=== Artistic ===
Men
Individual Qualification

Athlete	Event	Apparatus						Total	Rank
Athlete	Event	F	PH	R	V	PB	HB	Total	Rank
Terry Tay	Qualification	12.800	—N/a		13.750	—N/a			
Mikhail Haziq	Qualification	—N/a	11.750	—N/a					

Women
Team Final & Individual Qualification

Athlete	Event	Apparatus				Total	Rank
Athlete	Event	V	UB	BB	F	Total	Rank
Nadine Joy Nathan	Team	12.700	10.700	9.750	11.450	44.600	20 Q
Kaitlyn Lim	Team	12.400	—N/a	11.400	11.050	—N/a	
Cheong Yuet Yung	Team	12.050	~~9.500~~	—N/a			
Emma Yap	Team	~~11.250~~	10.250	11.050	12.000	44.550	21 Q
Shandy Poh	Team	—N/a	9.950	~~9.200~~	~~10.300~~	—N/a	
Total	Team	37.150	30.900	32.300	27.250	134.750	7

Individual Finals

Athlete	Event	Apparatus				Total	Rank
Athlete	Event	V	UB	BB	F	Total	Rank
Nadine Joy Nathan	All-around	12.850	12.050	11.600	11.400	47.900	11
Emma Yap	All-around	12.050	10.850	11.500	11.850	46.250	15

=== Rhythmic ===
Team Final & Individual Qualification

Athlete	Event	Apparatus				Total	Rank
Athlete	Event	Hoop	Ball	Clubs	Ribbon	Total	Rank
Katelin Heng	Team	23.300	22.500	22.700	21.950	90.450	23
Kaitlyn Chia	Team	19.400	22.050	21.600	19.300	82.350	25
Sophia Ho	Team	~~19.200~~	22.800	21.300	~~16.000~~	79.300	26
Total	Team	42.700	67.350	65.600	41.250	216.900	7

== Lawn bowls ==
Athlete	Event	Group stage					Quarterfinal	Semifinal	Final / BM	
Athlete	Event	Opposition Score	Opposition Score	Opposition Score	Opposition Score	Rank	Opposition Score	Opposition Score	Opposition Score	Rank
Shermeen Lim	Women's Singles	Inch (NZL); L 17–21	Buckingham (NIU); W 21–19	Pharaoh (ENG); L 3–21	Ahmad (MAS); L 17–21	4	Did not advance			
Shermeen Lim; Amira Goh; Lim Poh Eng	Women's Triples	Australia; L 11 - 22	Falkland Islands; W 23 - 10	South Africa; W 19 - 18	Northern Ireland; L 13 - 23	4	Did not advance			

== Para powerlifting ==
As of 27 May 2022, Singapore qualified one powerlifter through the World Para Powerlifting Commonwealth Rankings (for performances between 1 January 2020 and 25 April 2022).

Athlete	Event	Result	Rank
Nur'Aini Mohamad Yasli	Women's lightweight	74.7	7

== Swimming ==
Singapore selected eleven swimmers on 27 May 2022, plus one para swimmer who qualified through the World Para Swimming World Rankings (for performances between 31 December 2020 and 18 April 2022).

Men

Athlete	Event	Heat		Semifinal		Final	
Athlete	Event	Time	Rank	Time	Rank	Time	Rank
Mikkel Lee	50 m freestyle	22.69	11 Q	22.77	14	Did not advance	
Jonathan Tan	50 m freestyle	22.53	6 Q	22.57	9	Did not advance	
Teong Tzen Wei	50 m freestyle	22.62	8 Q	22.36	6 Q	22.26	5
Toh Wei Soong	50 m freestyle S7	—N/a				29.10	2nd place, silver medalist(s)
Darren Chua	100 m freestyle	51.38	26	Did not advance			
Mikkel Lee	100 m freestyle	50.21	14 Q	50.30	16	Did not advance	
Jonathan Tan	100 m freestyle	49.85	13 Q	50.03	14	Did not advance	
Quah Zheng Wen	50 m backstroke	25.78	13 Q	25.90	15	Did not advance	
Quah Zheng Wen	100 m backstroke	55.67	13 Q	56.41	16	Did not advance	
Maximillian Ang	50 m breaststroke	28.23	13 Q	28.29	14	Did not advance	
Maximillian Ang	100 m breaststroke	1:01.54	10 Q	1:01.42	13	Did not advance	
Maximillian Ang	200 m breaststroke	2:12.27	5 Q	—N/a		2:13.25	6
Mikkel Lee	50 m butterfly	23.79	7 Q	23.76	12	Did not advance	
Teong Tzen Wei	50 m butterfly	23.88	11 Q	23.24	2 Q	23.21	2nd place, silver medalist(s)
Quah Zheng Wen	100 m butterfly	52.65	8 Q	52.53	9	Did not advance	
Teong Tzen Wei	100 m butterfly	52.58	7 Q	52.88	11	Did not advance	
Jonathan Tan; Quah Zheng Wen; Mikkel Lee; Darren Chua	4 × 100 m freestyle relay	3:20.74	5 Q	—N/a		3:17.93	5
	4 × 100 m medley relay	Did not start		—N/a		Did not advance	

Women

Athlete	Event	Heat		Semifinal		Final	
Athlete	Event	Time	Rank	Time	Rank	Time	Rank
Amanda Lim	50 m freestyle	25.68	12 Q	25.62	11	Did not advance	
Quah Ting Wen	50 m freestyle	26.03	17	Did not advance			
Amanda Lim	100 m freestyle	57.08	20	Did not advance			
Quah Jing Wen	100 m freestyle	Did not start		Did not advance			
Quah Ting Wen	100 m freestyle	56.97	18	Did not advance			
Letitia Sim	50 m breaststroke	31.67	11 Q	31.56	11	Did not advance	
Letitia Sim	100 m breaststroke	1:09.29	11 Q	1:08.58	9	Did not advance	
Letitia Sim	200 m breaststroke	2:30.52	9 Q	—N/a		2:29.06	8
Quah Jing Wen	50 m butterfly	26.88	8 Q	26.80	10	Did not advance	
Quah Ting Wen	50 m butterfly	27.16	11 Q	27.00	13	Did not advance	
Quah Jing Wen	100 m butterfly	59.51	12 Q	59.09	10	Did not advance	
Quah Ting Wen	100 m butterfly	1:00.52	17	Did not advance			
Letitia Sim	100 m butterfly	1:01.05	19	Did not advance			
Quah Jing Wen	200 m butterfly	2:12.89	11	—N/a		Did not advance	
Quah Jing Wen	200 m individual medley	Did not start		—N/a		Did not advance	

Mixed

Athlete	Event	Heat		Final	
Athlete	Event	Time	Rank	Time	Rank
Jonathan Tan; Quah Jing Wen; Quah Zheng Wen; Quah Ting Wen; Darren Chua; Amanda Lim	4 × 100 m freestyle relay	3:33.71	6 Q	3:31.90	6
	4 × 100 m medley relay	Did not start		Did not advance	

== Table tennis ==
Singapore qualified for both the men's and women's team events via the ITTF World Team Rankings (as of 2 January 2020). Eight players were selected as of 1 July 2022.

Singles

Athletes	Event	Group stage				Round of 32	Round of 16	Quarterfinal	Semifinal	Final / BM	
Athletes	Event	Opposition Score	Opposition Score	Opposition Score	Rank	Opposition Score	Opposition Score	Opposition Score	Opposition Score	Opposition Score	Rank
Clarence Chew	Men's singles	Bye				Chambers (AUS); W 4 - 3	Drinkhall (ENG); L 0 - 4	Did not advance			
Koen Pang	Men's singles	Bye				Chen (CAN); W 4 - 1	Pitchford (ENG); L 0 - 4	Did not advance			
Izaac Quek	Men's singles	Bye				Cathcart (NIR); W 4 - 1	Wang (CAN); W 4 - 3	S Achanta (IND); L 0 - 4	Did not advance		
Feng Tianwei	Women's singles	Bye					Tennison (IND); W 4 - 1	Lay (AUS); W 4 - 0	S Akula (IND); W 4 - 3	Z Jian (SGP); W 4 - 3	1st place, gold medalist(s)
Zeng Jian	Women's singles	Bye				Tee (MAS); W 4 - 0	Thomas (WAL); W 4 - 1	M Batra (IND); W 4 - 0	Liu (AUS); W 4 - 2	F Tianwei (SGP); L 3 - 4	2nd place, silver medalist(s)
Zhou Jingyi	Women's singles	Bye				Sophie (NIR); L 3 - 4	Did not advance				

Doubles

Athletes	Event	Round of 64	Round of 32	Round of 16	Quarterfinal	Semifinal	Final / BM	
Athletes	Event	Opposition Score	Opposition Score	Opposition Score	Opposition Score	Opposition Score	Opposition Score	Rank
Koen Pang; Izaac Quek	Men's doubles	Bye	Mick & Godfrey (SEY); W 3 - 0	Bode & Aruna (NGR); L 2 - 3	Did not advance			
Clarence Chew; Ethan Poh	Men's doubles	Bye	Lee & Leong (MAS); W 3 - 1	Wang & Chen (CAN); W 3 - 1	Desai & Shetty (IND); W 3 - 0	Drinkhall & Pitchford (ENG); L 1 - 3	Lum & Liu (AUS); W 3 - 1	3rd place, bronze medalist(s)
Feng Tianwei; Zeng Jian	Women's doubles	Bye	Ojomu & Oribamise (NGR); W 3 - 0	Bardsley & Bolton (ENG); W 3 - 0	Feng & Liu (AUS); W 3 - 1	Carey & Hursey (WAL); W 3 - 2	Jee & Jian (AUS); W 3 - 0	1st place, gold medalist(s)
Zhou Jingyi; Wong Xin Ru	Women's doubles	Bye	Desscann & Ruqayyah (MRI); W 3 - 0	Cumberbatch & Unica (SVG); W 3 - 0	Akula & Tennison (IND); W 3 - 1	Jee & Jian (AUS); L 0 - 3	Carey & Hursey (WAL); L 1 - 3	4
Izaac Quek; Zhou Jingyi	Mixed doubles	Jones & Kalam (RSA); W 3 - 0	Pitchford & Ho (ENG); L 2 - 3	Did not advance				
Clarence Chew; Zeng Jian	Mixed doubles	Bye	Wu & Yee (FIJ); W 3 - 0	Wong & Tee (MAS); W 3 - 0	Luu & Liu (AUS); W 3 - 0	Choong & Lyne (MAS); L 1 - 3	Lum & Jee (AUS); W 3 - 1	3rd place, bronze medalist(s)
Koen Pang; Wong Xin Ru	Mixed doubles	Bye	Jarvis & Bardsley (ENG); L 2 - 3	Did not advance				

Team

Athletes	Event	Group stage				Quarterfinal	Semifinal	Final	Rank
Athletes	Event	Opposition Score	Opposition Score	Opposition Score	Rank	Opposition Score	Opposition Score	Opposition Score	Rank
Clarence Chew; Ethan Poh; Koen Pang; Izaac Quek	Men's team	Northern Ireland; W 3―0	India; L 0―3	Barbados; W 3―0	2 Q	Canada; W 3―0	England; W 3―2	India; L 1―3	2nd place, silver medalist(s)
Feng Tianwei; Zeng Jian; Wong Xin Ru; Zhou Jingyi	Women's team	England; W 3―0	Nigeria; W 3―0	Saint Vincent and the Grenadines; W 3―0	1 Q	Guyana; W 3―0	Australia; W 3―0	Malaysia; W 3—0	1st place, gold medalist(s)

== Weightlifting ==
Six weightlifters from Singapore (3 men & 3 women) qualified for the competition.

Men

Athlete	Event	Snatch (kg)	Clean & jerk (kg)	Total (kg)	Rank
Athlete	Event	Result	Result	Total (kg)	Rank
David Mok Pingwei	55 kg	81	100	181	8
Kester Loy	67 kg	109	128	237	9
Lim Kang Yin	81 kg	125	163	288	8

Women

Athlete	Event	Snatch (kg)	Clean & jerk (kg)	Total (kg)	Rank
Athlete	Event	Result	Result	Total (kg)	Rank
Chan Ying Ying	49 kg	61	76	137	10
Sarah Ang	59 kg	73	90	163	10
Nicole Heng	64 kg	76	93	169	10

== Wrestling ==
Singapore selected three wrestlers on 27 May 2022.

Key:

- VT - Victory by Fall.
- PP - Decision by Points - the loser with technical points.
- PO - Decision by Points - the loser without technical points.

Athlete	Event	Round of 16	Quarterfinal	Semifinal	Repechage	Final / BM	
Athlete	Event	Opposition Result	Opposition Result	Opposition Result	Opposition Result	Opposition Result	Rank
Lou Hong Yeow	Men's -74 kg	Bye	Sihag (IND); L 0 - 10	Did not advance	John (NGR); L 0 - 10	Did not advance	14
Gary Chow	Men's -86 kg	Lawrence (AUS); L 0 - 0	Did not advance				15
Danielle Lim	Women's -57 kg	Barrie (SLE); W 6 - 0	Taylor (CAN); L 0 - 10	Did not advance			7
