= Guyana at the 2022 Commonwealth Games =

- Flag of Guyana
- CG code: GUY
- CGA: Guyana Olympic Association
- Website: facebook.com/guy.olympic.association (Facebook)

in Birmingham, England 28 July 2022 – 8 August 2022
- Competitors: 32 (18 men and 14 women) in 6 sports
- Flag bearers (opening): Keevin Allicock; Aliyah Abrams
- Flag bearer (closing): TBD
- Medals: Gold 0 Silver 0 Bronze 0 Total 0

Commonwealth Games appearances (overview)
- 1930; 1934; 1938; 1950; 1954; 1958; 1962; 1966; 1970; 1974; 1978; 1982; 1986; 1990; 1994; 1998; 2002; 2006; 2010; 2014; 2018; 2022; 2026; 2030

Guyana competed at the 2022 Commonwealth Games at Birmingham, England from 28 July to 8 August 2022. It was the nineteenth time that Guyana is represented at the Commonwealth Games.

On 5 July 2022, a team of 32 athletes (18 men and 14 women) competing in six sports was announced. Keevin Allicock and Aliyah Abrams were the country's flagbearers during the opening ceremony.

== Competitors ==
The following is the list of number of competitors participating at the Games per sport/discipline.

Sport	Men	Women	Total
Athletics	5	5	10
Badminton	1	1	2
Boxing	3	0	3
Cycling	1	0	1
Squash	2	2	4
Swimming	2	2	4
Table tennis	4	4	8
Total	18	14	32

== Athletics ==
A squad of ten athletes was confirmed on 5 July 2022.

Men
Track and road events

Athlete	Event	Heat		Semifinal		Final	
Athlete	Event	Result	Rank	Result	Rank	Result	Rank
Emanuel Archibald	100 m	10.28	2 Q	10.43	6	did not advance	
Akeem Stewart	100 m	10.46	4	did not advance			
Noelex Holder	100 m	10.50	4	did not advance			
Arinze Chance	200 m	22.22	6	did not advance			
Akeem Stewart	200 m	21.42	5	did not advance			
Noelex Holder	200 m	21.77	5	did not advance			
Arinze Chance	400 m	47.63	5	did not advance			
Quamel Prince	800 m	1:50.82	6	—N/a		did not advance	
Akeem Stewart; Emanuel Archibald; Arinze Chance; Noelex Holder	4 × 100 m relay	39.82	3 Q	—N/a		40.05	4

Field events

Athlete	Event	Qualification		Final	
Athlete	Event	Distance	Rank	Distance	Rank
Emanuel Archibald	Long jump	7.83	6 q	7.54	11

Women
Track and road events

Athlete	Event	Heat		Semifinal		Final	
Athlete	Event	Result	Rank	Result	Rank	Result	Rank
Jasmine Abrams	100 m	11.41	3 Q	11.60	7	did not advance	
Kenisha Phillips	200 m	24.13	5 q	24.35	8	did not advance	
Aliyah Abrams	400 m	52.23	2 Q	52.82	6	did not advance	
Kenisha Phillips	400 m	54.08	6	did not advance			
Joanna Archer	800 m	2:07.24	6	did not advance			

Field events

Athlete	Event	Final	
Athlete	Event	Distance	Rank
Chantoba Bright	Triple jump	12.97	10

== Badminton ==
Two players were confirmed on 5 July 2022.

Athlete	Event	Round of 64	Round of 32	Round of 16	Quarterfinal	Semifinal	Final / BM	
Athlete	Event	Opposition Score	Opposition Score	Opposition Score	Opposition Score	Opposition Score	Opposition Score	Rank
Narayan Ramdhani	Men's singles	Bye	Lin (AUS); L 0 - 2	did not advance				
Priyanna Ramdhani	Women's singles	Shahzad (PAK); L 0 - 2	did not advance					
Narayan Ramdhani; Priyanna Ramdhani	Mixed doubles	Wanagaliya & Kobugabe (UGA); L 0 - 2	did not advance					

== Boxing ==
Three boxers were confirmed on 5 July 2022.

Men

Athlete	Event	Round of 32	Round of 16	Quarterfinals	Semifinals	Final	
Athlete	Event	Opposition Result	Opposition Result	Opposition Result	Opposition Result	Opposition Result	Rank
Keevin Allicock	Featherweight	Okoth (KEN); W 5 - 0	Nisshanka (SRI); W 5 - 0	Al-Ahmadieh (CAN); L 1 - 4	did not advance		
Colin Lewis	Light welterweight	Bye	Colin (MRI); L RSC	did not advance			
Desmond Amsterdam	Middleweight	Bye	Richardson (NZL); W 3 - 2	Peters (AUS); L RSC	did not advance		

== Cycling ==
One cyclist was confirmed on 5 July 2022.

=== Road ===
Athlete	Event	Time	Rank
Christopher Griffith	Men's road race	DNF	
Christopher Griffith	Men's time trial	1:04:38.91	51

== Squash ==
A squad of four players was confirmed on 5 July 2022.

Singles

Athlete	Event	Round of 64	Round of 32	Round of 16	Quarterfinals	Semifinals	Final	
Athlete	Event	Opposition Score	Opposition Score	Opposition Score	Opposition Score	Opposition Score	Opposition Score	Rank
Jason-Ray Khalil	Men's singles	Kadoma (UGA); W 3 - 2	Eain (MAS); L 0 - 3	did not advance				
Shomari Wiltshire	Men's singles	Laksiri (SRI); L 1 - 3	did not advance					
Mary Fung-A-Fat	Women's singles	Bye	Watts (NZL); L 0 - 3	did not advance				
Ashley Khalil	Women's singles	Kurrupu (SRI); L 2 - 3	did not advance					

Doubles

Athlete	Event	Round of 32	Round of 16	Quarterfinals	Semifinals	Final	
Athlete	Event	Opposition Score	Opposition Score	Opposition Score	Opposition Score	Opposition Score	Rank
Shomari Wiltshire; Jason-Ray Khalil	Men's doubles	Laksiri / Wakeel (SRI); L 0 - 2	did not advance				
Mary Fung-A-Fat; Ashley Khalil	Women's doubles	Bye	King / Landers-Murphy (NZL); L 0 - 2	did not advance			
Jason-Ray Khalil; Ashley Khalil	Mixed doubles	Whitlock / Creed (WAL); L 0 - 2	did not advance				
Shomari Wiltshire; Mary Fung-A-Fat	Mixed doubles	Idrakie / Ampandi (MAS); L 0 - 2	did not advance				

== Swimming ==
A squad of four swimmers was confirmed on 5 July 2022.

Men

Athlete	Event	Heat		Semifinal		Final	
Athlete	Event	Time	Rank	Time	Rank	Time	Rank
Paul Mahaica	50 m freestyle	25.15	54	did not advance			
Paul Mahaica	100 m freestyle	54.79	53	did not advance			
Paul Mahaica	50 m butterfly	26.88	47	did not advance			
Paul Mahaica	100 m butterfly	58.96	40	did not advance			
Sekhel Tzedeq	50 m freestyle	26.27	59	did not advance			
Sekhel Tzedeq	100 m freestyle	58.03	64	did not advance			
Sekhel Tzedeq	50 m backstroke	28.74	38	did not advance			
Sekhel Tzedeq	100 m backstroke	1:03.37	34	did not advance			

Women

Athlete	Event	Heat		Semifinal		Final	
Athlete	Event	Time	Rank	Time	Rank	Time	Rank
Patrice Mahaica	50 m freestyle	29.46	59	did not advance			
Patrice Mahaica	100 m freestyle	1:04.60	53	did not advance			
Patrice Mahaica	50 m backstroke	34.06	32	did not advance			
Aleka Persaud	50 m freestyle	27.81	37	did not advance			
Aleka Persaud	100 m freestyle	1:01.03	39	did not advance			
Aleka Persaud	50 m butterfly	30.23	38	did not advance			
Aleka Persaud	100 m butterfly	1:07.24	29	did not advance			

== Table tennis ==
Guyana qualified men's and women's teams for the table tennis competitions. Eight players were selected on 27 June 2022.

Singles

Athletes	Event	Group stage				Round of 32	Round of 16	Quarterfinal	Semifinal	Final / BM	
Athletes	Event	Opposition Score	Opposition Score	Opposition Score	Rank	Opposition Score	Opposition Score	Opposition Score	Opposition Score	Opposition Score	Rank
Shemar Britton	Men's singles	Cathcart (NIR); L 0 - 4	Bawm (BAN); W 4 - 1	—N/a	2	did not advance					
Christopher Franklin	Men's singles	Khawaja (PAK); L 0 - 4	Douglas (TTO); W 4 - 2	Ridoy (BAN); W 4 - 1	2	did not advance					
Jonathan van Lange	Men's singles	Wilson (NIR); L 1 - 4	Luu (AUS); L 0 - 4	—N/a	3	did not advance					
Natalie Cummings	Women's singles	Kalam (RSA); W 4 - 0	Ankude (GHA); W 4 - 0	—N/a	1 Q	Kinoo (MRI); W 4 - 3	Hursey (WAL); L 0 - 4	did not advance			
Chelsea Edghill	Women's singles	Agari (PNG); W 4 - 0	Titana (FIJ); W 4 - 0	—N/a	1 Q	Edem (NGR); L 2 - 4	did not advance				
Priscilla Greaves	Women's singles	Bristol (SEY); L 2 - 4	Earley (NIR); L 0 - 4	—N/a	3	did not advance					

Doubles

Athletes	Event	Round of 64	Round of 32	Round of 16	Quarterfinal	Semifinal	Final / BM	
Athletes	Event	Opposition Score	Opposition Score	Opposition Score	Opposition Score	Opposition Score	Opposition Score	Rank
Shemar Britton; Christopher Franklin	Men's doubles	Bye	Baboolall / Chan (MRI); W 3 - 1	Omeh / Omotayo (NGR); L 1 - 3	did not advance			
Jonathan van Lange; Joel Alleyne	Men's doubles	Bye	Kamal / Gnanasekaran (IND); L 0 - 3	did not advance				
Chelsea Edghill; Natalie Cummings	Women's doubles	Li / Yee (FIJ); W 3 - 1	Maphanga / Patel (RSA); W 3 - 1	Feng / Liu (AUS); L 0 - 3	did not advance			
Priscilla Greaves; Thuraia Thomas	Women's doubles	Bye	Bello / Edem (NGR); L 0 - 3	did not advance				
Shemar Britton; Chelsea Edghill	Mixed doubles	Nuopula / Sifi (SOL); W 3 - 1	Wong / Tee (MAS); L 1 - 3	did not advance				
Natalie Cummings; Christopher Franklin	Mixed doubles	Chauhan / Li (FIJ); W 3 - 0	Hazin / Fu (CAN); L 0 - 3	did not advance				
Jonathan van Lange; Thuraia Thomas	Mixed doubles	Leong / Ho (MAS); L 0 - 3	did not advance					

Team

Athletes	Event	Group stage				Quarterfinal	Semifinal	Final / BM	
Athletes	Event	Opposition Score	Opposition Score	Opposition Score	Rank	Opposition Score	Opposition Score	Opposition Score	Rank
Shemar Britton; Jonathan van Lange; Joel Alleyne; Christopher Franklin	Men's team	England; L 0 - 3	Bangladesh; L 2 - 3	Fiji; W 3 - 0	3	did not advance			
Thuraia Thomas; Priscilla Greaves; Natalie Cummings; Chelsea Edghill	Women's team	Fiji; W 3 - 0	South Africa; W 3 - 2	India; L 0 - 3	2 Q	Singapore; L 0 - 3	did not advance		
