= Table tennis at the 2022 Commonwealth Games – Women's singles =

Table tennis – Women's singles at the 2022 Commonwealth Games
- Venue: National Exhibition Centre
- Dates: 3 - 7 August 2022
- Competitors: 62 from 28 nations

Medalists
gold medal	Feng Tianwei	Singapore
silver medal	Zeng Jian	Singapore
bronze medal	Liu Yangzi	Australia

Table tennis women's singles at the 2022 Commonwealth Games was held at the National Exhibition Centre at Birmingham, England from 3 to 7 August 2022.

== Seeds ==
The seeds for the tournament were:

1. Feng Tianwei (SGP) (champion, gold medallist)
2. Manika Batra (IND) (quarterfinals)
3. Zhang Mo (CAN) (quarterfinals)
4. Fatima Atinuke Bello (NGR) (round of 32)
5. Zeng Jian (SGP) (final, silver medallist)
6. Liu Yangzi (AUS) (semifinals, bronze medallist)
7. Sreeja Akula (IND) (semifinals, fourth place)
8. Offiong Edem (NGR) (round of 16)

9. Reeth Tennison (IND) (round of 16)
10. Sarah Hanffou (CMR) (round of 32)
11. Zhou Jingyi (SGP) (round of 32)
12. Tin-Tin Ho (ENG) (round of 16)
13. Jian Fang Lay (AUS) (quarterfinals)
14. Ruqayyah Kinoo (MRI) (round of 32)
15. Charlotte Carey (WAL) (round of 16)
16. Jee Minhyung (AUS) (round of 16)

Click on the seed number of a player to go to their draw section.

== Main draw ==
=== Finals ===
Semifinals
1	Feng Tianwei (SGP)	11	8	6	11	11	8	12
7	Sreeja Akula (IND)	6	11	11	9	8	11	10
6	Liu Yangzi (AUS)	11	11	10	4	6	9
5	Zeng Jian (SGP)	7	9	12	11	11	11

Gold medal match
1	Feng Tianwei (SGP) (gold)	6	5	8	11	11	11	11
5	Zeng Jian (SGP) (silver)	11	11	11	4	6	8	5
Bronze medal match
7	Sreeja Akula (IND)	11	6	2	11	13	11	7
6	Liu Yangzi (AUS) (bronze)	3	11	11	7	15	9	11

=== Top half ===
==== Section 1 ====
Round of 32
Gr8	Charlotte Bardsley (ENG)	8	12	6	10	3
9	Reeth Tennison (IND)	11	10	11	12	11
13	Jian Fang Lay (AUS)	11	14	11	11
Gr6	Katherine Morin (CAN)	2	12	7	5
Gr2	Chelsea Edghill (GUY)	2	14	9	11	11	12
8	Offiong Edem (NGR)	11	12	11	13	3	14

Round of 16
1	Feng Tianwei (SGP)	11	11	9	11	11
9	Reeth Tennison (IND)	2	4	11	3	4
13	Jian Fang Lay (AUS)	13	11	11	9	11
8	Offiong Edem (NGR)	11	3	6	11	7

Quarterfinals
1	Feng Tianwei (SGP)	11	11	11	11
13	Jian Fang Lay (AUS)	6	7	9	3

==== Section 2 ====
Round of 32
7	Sreeja Akula (IND)	12	12	4	11	11
Gr4	Karen Lyne (MAS)	10	10	11	8	8
Gr3	Esther Oribamise (NGR)	4	7	4	11	11	9
15	Charlotte Carey (WAL)	11	11	11	9	9	11
11	Zhou Jingyi (SGP)	6	11	11	8	11	9	7
Gr9	Sophie Earley (NIR)	11	4	7	11	4	11	11
Gr10	Danisha Patel (RSA)	5	1	7	6
3	Zhang Mo (CAN)	11	11	11	11

Round of 16
7	Sreeja Akula (IND)	8	11	12	9	11	15	12
15	Charlotte Carey (WAL)	11	7	14	11	4	13	10
Gr9	Sophie Earley (NIR)	6	11	11	12	8	7	4
3	Zhang Mo (CAN)	11	5	7	10	11	11	11

Quarterfinals
7	Sreeja Akula (IND)	9	11	6	9	11	11	11
3	Zhang Mo (CAN)	11	4	11	11	5	4	8

=== Bottom half ===
==== Section 3 ====
Round of 32
4	Fatima Atinuke Bello (NGR)	4	3	6	5
Gr1	Anna Hursey (WAL)	11	11	11	11
Gr13	Natalie Cummings (GUY)	11	8	11	9	11	6	12
14	Ruqayyah Kinoo (MRI)	5	11	9	11	5	11	10
12	Tin-Tin Ho (ENG)	11	11	13	9	11	11
Gr12	Hannah Silcock (JEY)	4	6	15	11	3	4
Gr14	Ho Ying (MAS)	13	7	5	12	4	11	7
6	Liu Yangzi (AUS)	11	11	11	10	11	9	11

Round of 16
Gr1	Anna Hursey (WAL)	11	11	11	11
Gr13	Natalie Cummings (GUY)	4	3	4	7
12	Tin-Tin Ho (ENG)	8	12	6	6
6	Liu Yangzi (AUS)	11	14	11	11

Quarterfinals
Gr1	Anna Hursey (WAL)	11	6	6	10	8
6	Liu Yangzi (AUS)	8	11	11	12	11

==== Section 4 ====
Round of 32
5	Zeng Jian (SGP)	11	11	11	11
Gr5	Tee Ai Xin (MAS)	3	6	4	2
Gr7	Chloe Thomas Wu Zhang (WAL)	7	11	9	11	11	11
10	Sarah Hanffou (CMR)	11	8	11	4	7	5
16	Jee Minhyung (AUS)	11	11	11	11
Gr11	Aishath Rafa Nazim (MDV)	6	2	6	2
Gr15	Fu Ching Nam (CAN)	5	2	7	6
2	Manika Batra (IND)	11	11	11	11

Round of 16
5	Zeng Jian (SGP)	11	11	11	11	11
Gr7	Chloe Thomas Wu Zhang (WAL)	13	4	8	3	3
16	Jee Minhyung (AUS)	4	8	6	10
2	Manika Batra (IND)	11	11	11	12

Quarterfinals
5	Zeng Jian (SGP)	12	11	11	11
2	Manika Batra (IND)	10	9	4	7

== Preliminary stage ==
=== Group 1 ===
Name	Pld	MW	ML	GW	GL
Anna Hursey (WAL)	2	2	0	8	0
Nandeshwaree Jalim (MRI)	2	1	1	4	4
Catherine Spicer (TTO)	2	0	2	0	8

Date	Time	Player 1	Score	Player 2	Set 1	Set 2	Set 3	Set 4	Set 5	Set 6	Set 7
3 August	9:30	Nandeshwaree Jalim (MRI)	4–0	Catherine Spicer (TTO)	12–10	11–3	11–7	11–7			
3 August	11:15	Anna Hursey (WAL)	4–0	Catherine Spicer (TTO)	11–6	11–1	11–3	11–1			
3 August	13:07	Nandeshwaree Jalim (MRI)	0–4	Anna Hursey (WAL)	4–11	6–11	5–11	10–12			

=== Group 2 ===
Name	Pld	MW	ML	GW	GL
Chealsea Edghill (GUY)	2	2	0	8	0
Tousea Titana (FIJ)	2	1	1	4	7
Tammi Agari (PNG)	2	0	2	3	8

Date	Time	Player 1	Score	Player 2	Set 1	Set 2	Set 3	Set 4	Set 5	Set 6	Set 7
3 August	9:30	Chealsea Edghill (GUY)	4–0	Tammi Agari (PNG)	11–2	11–4	11–5	11–5			
3 August	11:15	Tousea Titana (FIJ)	4–3	Tammi Agari (PNG)	18–16	10–12	9–11	12–10	11–4	6–11	11–9
3 August	13:12	Tousea Titana (FIJ)	0–4	Chealsea Edghill (GUY)	2–11	1–11	2–11	0–11			

=== Group 3 ===
Name	Pld	MW	ML	GW	GL	Pts
Esther Oribamise (NGR)	2	2	0	8	0	4
Sadia Rahman Mou (BAN)	2	1	1	4	4	3
Roanna Abel (VAN)	2	0	2	0	8	2

Date	Time	Player 1	Score	Player 2	Set 1	Set 2	Set 3	Set 4	Set 5	Set 6	Set 7
3 August	9:23	Esther Oribamise (NGR)	4–0	Roanna Abel (VAN)	11–4	11–4	11–4	11–2			
3 August	11:15	Sadia Rahman Mou (BAN)	4–0	Roanna Abel (VAN)	11–7	11–5	11–6	11–2			
3 August	13:06	Esther Oribamise (NGR)	4–0	Sadia Rahman Mou (BAN)	11–2	11–7	11–3	11–5			

=== Group 4 ===
Name	Pld	MW	ML	GW	GL	Pts
Karen Lyne (MAS)	2	2	0	8	1	4
Rebecca Plaistow (SCO)	2	1	1	5	4	3
Cynthia Kwabi (GHA)	2	0	2	0	8	2

Date	Time	Player 1	Score	Player 2	Set 1	Set 2	Set 3	Set 4	Set 5	Set 6	Set 7
3 August	9:30	Rebecca Plaistow (SCO)	4–0	Cynthia Kwabi (GHA)	11–8	12–10	11–6	11–8			
3 August	11:20	Rebecca Plaistow (SCO)	1–4	Karen Lyne (MAS)	11–9	4–11	6–11	8–11	4–11		
3 August	13:06	Karen Lyne (MAS)	4–0	Cynthia Kwabi (GHA)	11–7	11–7	11–5	11–3			

=== Group 5 ===
Name	Pld	MW	ML	GW	GL	Pts
Tee Ai Xin (MAS)	2	2	0	8	3	4
Maria Tsaptsinos (ENG)	2	1	1	7	4	3
Judith Nangonzi (UGA)	2	0	2	0	8	2

Date	Time	Player 1	Score	Player 2	Set 1	Set 2	Set 3	Set 4	Set 5	Set 6	Set 7
3 August	9:24	Maria Tsaptsinos (ENG)	4–0	Judith Nangonzi (UGA)	11–2	11–5	11–5	11–3			
3 August	11:16	Tee Ai Xin (MAS)	4–0	Judith Nangonzi (UGA)	11–4	11–4	11–5	11–6			
3 August	13:07	Maria Tsaptsinos (ENG)	3–4	Tee Ai Xin (MAS)	10–12	7–11	11–8	7–11	11–8	11–6	4–11

=== Group 6 ===
Name	Pld	MW	ML	GW	GL	Pts
Katherine Morin (CAN)	2	2	0	8	0	4
Sonam Sultana (BAN)	2	1	1	4	4	2
Connie Sifi (SOL)	2	0	2	0	8	2

Date	Time	Player 1	Score	Player 2	Set 1	Set 2	Set 3	Set 4	Set 5	Set 6	Set 7
3 August	9:24	Katherine Morin (CAN)	4–0	Connie Sifi (SOL)	11–2	11–4	11–1	11–6			
3 August	11:16	Sonam Sultana (BAN)	4–0	Connie Sifi (SOL)	11–1	11–6	11–2	11–9			
3 August	13:00	Katherine Morin (CAN)	4–0	Sonam Sultana (BAN)	w/o						

=== Group 7 ===
Name	Pld	MW	ML	GW	GL	Pts
Chloe Thomas Wu Zhang (WAL)	2	2	0	8	0	4
Fathimath Dheema Ali (MDV)	1	1	1	4	4	3
Zodwa Maphanga (RSA)	2	0	2	0	8	2

Date	Time	Player 1	Score	Player 2	Set 1	Set 2	Set 3	Set 4	Set 5	Set 6	Set 7
3 August	9:25	Chloe Thomas Wu Zhang (WAL)	4–0	Zodwa Maphanga (RSA)	11–3	12–10	11–7	12–10			
3 August	11:16	Fathimath Dheema Ali (MDV)	4–0	Zodwa Maphanga (RSA)	11–4	11–6	11–7	11–4			
3 August	13:06	Fathimath Dheema Ali (MDV)	0–4	Chloe Thomas Wu Zhang (WAL)	7–11	10–12	4–11	7–11			

=== Group 8 ===
Name	Pld	MW	ML	GW	GL	Pts
Charlotte Bardsley (ENG)	2	2	0	8	1	4
Foteini Meletie (CYP)	2	1	1	5	7	3
Rheann Chung (TTO)	2	0	2	3	8	2

Date	Time	Player 1	Score	Player 2	Set 1	Set 2	Set 3	Set 4	Set 5	Set 6	Set 7
3 August	9:31	Charlotte Bardsley (ENG)	4–0	Rheann Chung (TTO)	11–4	11–9	11–7	11–8			
3 August	11:15	Foteini Meletie (CYP)	4–3	Rheann Chung (TTO)	3–11	11–9	8–11	5–11	12–10	12–10	11–7
3 August	13:07	Charlotte Bardsley (ENG)	4–1	Foteini Meletie (CYP)	10–12	11–6	11–8	11–1	11–2		

=== Group 9 ===
Name	Pld	MW	ML	GW	GL	Pts
Sophie Earley (NIR)	2	2	0	8	0	4
Christy Bristol (SEY)	2	1	1	4	6	3
Priscilla Greaves (GUY)	2	0	2	2	8	2

Date	Time	Player 1	Score	Player 2	Set 1	Set 2	Set 3	Set 4	Set 5	Set 6	Set 7
3 August	16:00	Sophie Earley (NIR)	4–0	Christy Bristol (SEY)	11–7	11–7	11–2	11–8			
3 August	17:45	Priscilla Greaves (GUY)	2–4	Christy Bristol (SEY)	11–8	5–11	12–14	9–11	12–10	8–11	
3 August	20:05	Sophie Earley (NIR)	4–0	Priscilla Greaves (GUY)	11–2	11–2	11–5	11–4			

=== Group 10 ===
Name	Pld	MW	ML	GW	GL	Pts
Danisha Jayavant Patel (RSA)	2	2	0	8	0	4
Solesha Young (JAM)	2	1	1	4	5	3
Jenny Compell Amadi (KEN)	2	0	2	1	8	2

Date	Time	Player 1	Score	Player 2	Set 1	Set 2	Set 3	Set 4	Set 5	Set 6	Set 7
3 August	16:00	Solesha Young (JAM)	0–4	Danisha Jayavant Patel (RSA)	4–11	4–11	3–11	8–11			
3 August	17:45	Jenny Compell Amadi (KEN)	0–4	Danisha Jayavant Patel (RSA)	3–11	2–11	6–11	3–11			
3 August	20:05	Solesha Young (JAM)	4–1	Jenny Compell Amadi (KEN)	11–8	11–9	10–12	11–6	11–8		

=== Group 11 ===
Name	Pld	MW	ML	GW	GL	Pts
Aishath Rafa Nazim (MDV)	2	2	0	8	0	4
Rita Nakhumitsa (UGA)	2	1	1	4	4	3
Laura Sinon (SEY)	2	0	2	0	8	2

Date	Time	Player 1	Score	Player 2	Set 1	Set 2	Set 3	Set 4	Set 5	Set 6	Set 7
3 August	16:00	Rita Nakhumitsa (UGA)	4–0	Laura Sinon (SEY)	11–5	11–5	12–10	11–7			
3 August	17:45	Aishath Rafa Nazim (MDV)	4–0	Laura Sinon (SEY)	11–3	11–3	11–3	11–1			
3 August	20:05	Rita Nakhumitsa (UGA)	0–4	Aishath Rafa Nazim (MDV)	4–11	6–11	7–11	9–11			

=== Group 12 ===
Name	Pld	MW	ML	GW	GL	Pts
Hannah Silcock (JEY)	2	2	0	8	2	4
Oumehani Hosenally (MRI)	2	1	1	5	6	3
Florence Seera (UGA)	2	0	2	3	8	2

Date	Time	Player 1	Score	Player 2	Set 1	Set 2	Set 3	Set 4	Set 5	Set 6	Set 7
3 August	16:00	Florence Seera (UGA)	2–4	Oumehani Hosenally (MRI)	4–11	6–11	11–4	5–11	11–7	5–11	
3 August	17:45	Hannah Silcock (JEY)	4–1	Oumehani Hosenally (MRI)	8–11	11–5	11–8	12–10	11–7		
3 August	20:05	Florence Seera (UGA)	1–4	Hannah Silcock (JEY)	8–11	9–11	11–7	5–11	9–11		

=== Group 13 ===
Name	Pld	MW	ML	GW	GL	Pts
Natalie Cummings (GUY)	2	2	0	8	0	4
Musfiquh Kalam (RSA)	2	1	2	4	5	3
Millicent Ankude (GHA)	2	0	2	1	8	2

Date	Time	Player 1	Score	Player 2	Set 1	Set 2	Set 3	Set 4	Set 5	Set 6	Set 7
3 August	16:00	Millicent Ankude (GHA)	1–4	Musfiquh Kalam (RSA)	12–14	11–8	8–11	4–11	6–11		
3 August	17:45	Natalie Cummings (GUY)	4–0	Musfiquh Kalam (RSA)	12–10	11–8	11–8	11–5			
3 August	20:05	Millicent Ankude (GHA)	0–4	Natalie Cummings (GUY)	1–11	2–11	2–11	7–11			

=== Group 14 ===
Name	Pld	MW	ML	GW	GL	Pts
Ho Ying (MAS)	3	3	0	12	1	6
Lucy Elliott (SCO)	3	2	1	8	5	5
Grace Rosi Yee (FIJ)	3	1	2	6	9	4
Tracey Mawa (VAN)	3	0	3	1	12	3

Date	Time	Player 1	Score	Player 2	Set 1	Set 2	Set 3	Set 4	Set 5	Set 6	Set 7
3 August	16:00	Ho Ying (MAS)	4–0	Lucy Elliott (SCO)	11–5	11–8	11–8	11–8			
3 August	16:00	Grace Rosi Yee (FIJ)	4–1	Tracey Mawa (VAN)	13–11	3–11	11–4	11–7	11–5		
3 August	18:20	Ho Ying (MAS)	4–0	Tracey Mawa (VAN)	11–5	11–0	11–3	11–1			
3 August	18:20	Grace Rosi Yee (FIJ)	1–4	Lucy Elliott (SCO)	4–11	12–10	6–11	9–11	8–11		
3 August	20:05	Ho Ying (MAS)	4–1	Grace Rosi Yee (FIJ)	9–11	11–4	11–2	11–0	11–4		
3 August	20:05	Lucy Elliott (SCO)	4–0	Tracey Mawa (VAN)	11–2	11–5	11–4	11–5			

=== Group 15 ===
Name	Pld	MW	ML	GW	GL	Pts
Fu Ching Nam (CAN)	3	3	0	12	3	6
Carolyn Li (FIJ)	3	2	1	9	8	5
Fathimath Jumana Nimal (MDV)	3	1	2	8	9	4
Stephanie Qwea (VAN)	3	0	3	3	12	3

Date	Time	Player 1	Score	Player 2	Set 1	Set 2	Set 3	Set 4	Set 5	Set 6	Set 7
3 August	16:00	Fu Ching Nam (CAN)	4–2	Fathimath Jumana Nimal (MDV)	8–11	7–11	12–10	11–7	11–6	12–10	
3 August	16:00	Carolyn Li (FIJ)	4–2	Stephanie Qwea (VAN)	14–12	11–6	8–11	11–4	9–11	11–9	
3 August	18:20	Fu Ching Nam (CAN)	4–0	Stephanie Qwea (VAN)	11–4	11–4	11–7	11–4			
3 August	18:20	Carolyn Li (FIJ)	4–2	Fathimath Jumana Nimal (MDV)	11–9	1–11	11–6	13–11	2–11	11–9	
3 August	20:05	Fu Ching Nam (CAN)	4–1	Carolyn Li (FIJ)	11–8	9–11	11–6	11–4	11–7		
3 August	20:05	Fathimath Jumana Nimal (MDV)	4–1	Stephanie Qwea (VAN)	11–8	8–11	11–2	11–5	11–7		
