= Mauritius at the 2022 Commonwealth Games =

- Flag of Mauritius
- CGF code: MRI
- CGA: Mauritius Olympic Committee
- Website: mauritiusolympic.org/en

in Birmingham, England 28 July 2022 – 8 August 2022
- Competitors: 60 (34 men and 26 women) in 10 sports
- Flag bearers: Merven Clair; Priscilla Morand; Noemi Alphonse
- Medals Ranked 27th: Gold 0 Silver 3 Bronze 2 Total 5

Commonwealth Games appearances (overview)
- 1958; 1962; 1966; 1970; 1974; 1978; 1982; 1986; 1990; 1994; 1998; 2002; 2006; 2010; 2014; 2018; 2022; 2026; 2030

Mauritius competed at the 2022 Commonwealth Games at Birmingham, England from 28 July to 8 August 2022. It was the team's 16th appearance at the Games.

Unlike prior editions, Mauritius will have three flagbearers (the first team to have three flagbearers) during the opening ceremony. Boxer Merven Clair, judoka Priscilla Morand and para-athlete Noemi Alphonse will be the flagbearers.

== Medalists ==
Medal	Name	Sport	Event	Date
Silver	Roilya Ranaivosoa	Weightlifting	Women's 49 kg	30 July
Silver	Remi Feuillet	Judo	Men's 90kg	3 August
Silver	Richarno Colin	Boxing	Men's light welterweight	7 August
Bronze	Christianne Legentil	Judo	Women's -57kg	1 August
Bronze	Sebastien Perrinne	Judo	Men's +100kg	3 August

Medals by sport
Sport	Gold medal	Silver medal	Bronze medal	Total
Boxing	0	1	0	1
Judo	0	1	2	3
Weightlifting	0	1	0	1
Total	0	3	2	5

Medals by date
Date	Gold medal	Silver medal	Bronze medal	Total
30 July	0	1	0	1
1 August	0	0	1	1
3 August	0	1	1	2
7 August	0	1	0	1
Total	0	3	2	5

Medals by gender
Gender	Gold medal	Silver medal	Bronze medal	Total
Male	0	2	1	3
Female	0	1	1	2
Mixed / open	0	0	0	0
Total	0	3	2	5

== Competitors ==
The following is the list of number of competitors participating at the Games per sport/discipline.

Sport	Men	Women	Total
Athletics	2	4	6
Badminton	4	4	8
Boxing	6	0	6
Cycling	5	3	8
Judo	4	4	8
Swimming	2	2	4
Table tennis	4	4	8
Triathlon	1	1	2
Weightlifting	3	2	5
Wrestling	3	2	5
Total	34	26	60

== Athletics ==
Men
Track and road events

Athlete	Event	Heat		Final	
Athlete	Event	Result	Rank	Result	Rank
Cedric Ravet	1500 m (T54)	—N/a		3:45.30	7
Jeremie Lararaudeuse	110 m hurdles	13.88	6	Did not advance	

Women
Track and road events

Athlete	Event	Heat		Final	
Athlete	Event	Result	Rank	Result	Rank
Anais Angeline	100 m (T38)	14.63	6	Did not advance	
Marie Alphonse	1500 m (T54)	—N/a		4:01.09	6
Katie Mauthoor	Marathon	—N/a		2:46:43	13

Field events

Athlete	Event	Final	
Athlete	Event	Distance	Rank
Liliane Potiron	Triple jump	13.20	8

== Badminton ==
As of 1 June 2022, Mauritius qualified for the mixed team event via the BWF World Rankings.

Singles

Athlete	Event	Round of 64	Round of 32	Round of 16	Quarterfinal	Semifinal	Final / BM	
Athlete	Event	Opposition Score	Opposition Score	Opposition Score	Opposition Score	Opposition Score	Opposition Score	Rank
Alexandre Bongout	Men's singles	Angus (JAM); W (21–9, 21–12)	Assembe (CMR); W (21–7, 21–6)	Loh (SGP); L (13–21, 10–21)	Did not advance			
Aatish Lubah	Men's singles	Abeywickrama (SRI); L (7–21, 22–20, 11–21)	Did not advance					
Julien Paul	Men's singles	Bye	Kakora (RSA); W (21–6, 18–21, 21–3)	Mulenga (ZAM); W (21–9, 21–11)	Sen (IND); L (12–21, 11–21)	Did not advance		
Lorna Bodha	Women's singles	Trebert (GGY); W (21–7, 21–13)	Chen (AUS); L (3–21, 6–21)	Did not advance				
Kobita Dookhee	Women's singles	Bye	Darragh (NIR); L (10–21, 8–21)	Did not advance				
Jemimah Leung	Women's singles	Bye	Williams (BAR); L (17–21, 21–10, 19–21)	Did not advance				

Doubles

Athlete	Event	Round of 64	Round of 32	Round of 16	Quarterfinal	Semifinal	Final / BM	
Athlete	Event	Opposition Score	Opposition Score	Opposition Score	Opposition Score	Opposition Score	Opposition Score	Rank
Julien Paul; Aatish Lubah	Men's doubles	—N/a	Chan & Tan (MAS); L (12–21, 11–21)	Did not advance				
Alexandre Bongout; Tejraj Pultoo	Men's doubles	—N/a	Angus & Ricketts (JAM); L (19–21, 15–21)	Did not advance				
Ganesha Mungrah; Jemimah Leung	Women's doubles	—N/a	Naluwooza & Wanyana (UGA); W (16–21, 21–18, 21–15)	Jolly & Gopichand (IND); L (2–21, 4–21)	Did not advance			
Lorna Bodha; Kobita Dookhee	Women's doubles	—N/a	Chipeleme & Siamupangila (ZAM); W (21–9, 21–7)	Kobugabe & Mohamed Rafi (UGA); L (19–21, 19–21)	Did not advance			
Aatish Lubah; Lorna Bodha	Mixed doubles	Mdogo Sikoyo & Gupta (KEN); W (21–4, 21–10)	Summers & Scholtz (RSA); L (8–21, 14–21)	Did not advance				
Alexandre Bongout; Jemimah Leung	Mixed doubles	Tamakloe & Tornyenyor (GHA); W (21–5, 21–17)	Leydon-Davis & Pak (NZL); L (7–21, 10–21)	Did not advance				
Tejraj Pultoo; Ganesha Mungrah	Mixed doubles	Bye	Tan & Lai (MAS); L (5–21, 8–21)	Did not advance				
Julien Paul; Kobita Dookee	Mixed doubles	Bye	Hall & MacPherson (SCO); L (7–21, 8–21)	Did not advance				

Mixed team

Summary

Team	Event	Group stage				Quarterfinal	Semifinal	Final / BM	
Team	Event	Opposition Score	Opposition Score	Opposition Score	Rank	Opposition Score	Opposition Score	Opposition Score	Rank
Mauritius	Mixed team	Singapore; L 0–5	England; L 0–5	Barbados; W 4–1	3	Did not advance			

Group stage

Pos	Team	Pld	W	L	MF	MA	MD	GF	GA	GD	PF	PA	PD	Pts	Qualification
1	Singapore	3	3	0	14	1	+13	29	2	+27	639	301	+338	3	Knockout stage
2	England	3	2	1	11	4	+7	22	9	+13	577	367	+210	2	Knockout stage
3	Mauritius	3	1	2	4	11	−7	9	22	−13	386	583	−197	1	
4	Barbados	3	0	3	1	14	−13	2	29	−27	296	647	−351	0	

Source: BWF

Singapore
5
National Exhibition Centre, Court 2
29 July 2022, 09:00 UTC+1

Mauritius
0

			1	2	3
1	(Singapore) (Mauritius)	Andy Kwek / Tan Wei Han; Tejraj Pultoo / Kobita Dookhee	21; 8	21; 11
2	(Singapore) (Mauritius)	Yeo Jia Min; Jemimah Leung	21; 2	21; 2
3	(Singapore) (Mauritius)	Loh Kean Yew; Julien Paul	21; 10	21; 12
4	(Singapore) (Mauritius)	Crystal Wong / Jin Yujia; Kobita Dookhee / Lorna Bodha	21; 8	21; 6
5	(Singapore) (Mauritius)	Terry Hee / Loh Kean Hean; Alexandre Bongout / Tejraj Pultoo	21; 9	21; 10

England
5
National Exhibition Centre, Court 2
29 July 2022, 19:00 UTC+1

Mauritius
0

			1	2	3
1	(England) (Mauritius)	Callum Hemming / Jessica Pugh; Aatish Lubah / Lorna Bodha	21; 1	21; 13
2	(England) (Mauritius)	Toby Penty; Julien Paul	21; 14	21; 7
3	(England) (Mauritius)	Ben Lane / Sean Vendy; Tejraj Pultoo / Alexandre Bongout	21; 9	21; 9
4	(England) (Mauritius)	Freya Patel-Redfearn; Ganesha Mungrah	21; 9	21; 7
5	(England) (Mauritius)	Lauren Smith / Chloe Birch; Kobita Dookhee / Lorna Bodha	21; 4	21; 8

Mauritius
4
National Exhibition Centre, Court 4
30 July 2022, 14:00 UTC+1

Barbados
1

			1	2	3
1	(Mauritius) (Barbados)	Tejraj Pultoo / Kobita Dookhee; Shae Martin / Sabrina Scott	17; 21	21; 16	19; 21
2	(Mauritius) (Barbados)	Alexandre Bongout; Kennie Maarten King	23; 21	21; 18
3	(Mauritius) (Barbados)	Aatish Lubah / Julien Paul; Kennie Maarten King / Shae Martin	21; 6	21; 15
4	(Mauritius) (Barbados)	Lorna Bodha; Tamisha Williams	21; 11	21; 12
5	(Mauritius) (Barbados)	Lorna Bodha / Kobita Dookhee; Sabrina Scott / Tamisha Williams	21; 14	21; 8

== Boxing ==
Men

Athlete	Event	Round of 32	Round of 16	Quarterfinals	Semifinals	Final	
Athlete	Event	Opposition Result	Opposition Result	Opposition Result	Opposition Result	Opposition Result	Rank
Niven Chemben	Featherweight	Davule (FIJ); L 2 - 3	Did not advance				
Louis Colin	Light welterweight	Frame (JEY); W 5 - 0	Lewis (GUY); W RSC	Tyers (ENG); W 4 - 1	Omar (GHA); W 5 - 0	Lynch (SCO); L 1 - 4	2nd place, silver medalist(s)
Jean Vadamootoo	Welterweight	Bangke (KIR); W 3 - 2	Croft (WAL); L 0 - 5	Did not advance			
Merven Clair	Light middleweight	Boniface (SEY); W 5 - 0	Ahmad (AUS); W 5 - 0	Croft (WAL); L 0 - 5	Did not advance		
Jean Luc Rosalba	Light heavyweight	Samed (GHA); W WO	Lazzerini (SCO); L RSC	Did not advance			
Jean Christophe Otendy	Super heavyweight	—N/a	Paul (TTO); L RSC	Did not advance			

== Cycling ==
A squad of eight cyclists was officially selected on 1 July 2022.

=== Road ===
Men

Athlete	Event	Time	Rank
Alexandre Mayer	Road race	3:37:00	19
Yannick Lincoln	Road race	3:37:08	34
Christopher Roughier Lagane	Road race	3:38:11	68
Aurélien de Comarmond	Road race	3:37:08	32
Gregory Mayer	Road race	3:47:08	73
Alexandre Mayer	Time trial	55:10.80	34
Christopher Roughier Lagane	Time trial	55:09.46	33

Women

Athlete	Event	Time	Rank
Aurélie Halbwachs-Lincoln	Road race	2:44:53	25
Kimberley Le Court	Road race	2:44:46	16
Raphaëlle Lamusse	Road race	2:50:03	40
Aurélie Halbwachs-Lincoln	Time trial	46:38.29	23

=== Mountain bike ===
Athlete	Event	Time	Rank
Alexandre Mayer	Men's cross-country	LAP	
Yannick Lincoln	Men's cross-country	LAP	
Kimberley Le Court	Women's cross-country	1:43:57	5

== Judo ==
A squad of six judoka was entered as of 13 July 2022.

Men

Athlete	Event	Round of 32	Round of 16	Quarterfinals	Semifinals	Repechage	Final/BM	
Athlete	Event	Opposition Result	Opposition Result	Opposition Result	Opposition Result	Opposition Result	Opposition Result	Rank
Winsley Gangaya	-60 kg	Bye	Yadav (IND); L 00 - 10	Did not advance				9
Remi Feuillet	-90 kg	—N/a	—N/a	Bye	Cassar (AUS); W 10 - 00	—N/a	Petgrave (ENG); L 00 - 01	2nd place, silver medalist(s)
Hansley Adonis	-100 kg	—N/a	Takayawa (FIJ); L 00 - 10	Did not advance				9
Sebastien Perrinne	+100 kg	—N/a	Bye	Afude (KEN); W 10 - 00	Andrews (NZL); L 00 - 10	—N/a	McWatt (SCO); W 01 - 00	3rd place, bronze medalist(s)

Women

Athlete	Event	Round of 16	Quarterfinals	Semifinals	Repechage	Final/BM	
Athlete	Event	Opposition Result	Opposition Result	Opposition Result	Opposition Result	Opposition Result	Rank
Priscilla Morand	-48 kg	Bye	Tari (VAN); W 10 - 00	Likmabam (IND); L 00 - 10	—N/a	Esposito (MLT); L 00 - 10	5
Christianne Legentil	-57 kg	Bye	Christie (NZL); W 01 - 00	Toprak (ENG); L 00 - 10	—N/a	Tariyal (IND); W 01 - 00	3rd place, bronze medalist(s)
Franceska Agathe	-78 kg	—N/a	Powell (WAL); L 00 - 10	Did not advance	Arrey Sophina (CMR); L 00 - 10	Did not advance	7
Tracy Durhone	+78 kg	Withana (SRI); W 10 - 00	Maan (IND); L 00 - 10	Did not advance	Wood (TTO); L 00 - 10	Did not advance	7

== Swimming ==
A squad of four swimmers was officially selected on 21 May 2022.

Men

Athlete	Event	Heat		Semifinal		Final	
Athlete	Event	Time	Rank	Time	Rank	Time	Rank
Gregory Anodin	50 m freestyle	24.33	36	Did not advance			
Gregory Anodin	100 m freestyle	52.76	37	Did not advance			
Gregory Anodin	50 m breaststroke	31.18	34	Did not advance			
Bradley Vincent	50 m freestyle	23.34	20	Did not advance			
Bradley Vincent	100 m freestyle	51.29	24	Did not advance			

Women

Athlete	Event	Heat		Semifinal		Final	
Athlete	Event	Time	Rank	Time	Rank	Time	Rank
Tessa Ip	50 m freestyle	28.30	49	Did not advance			
Tessa Ip	50 m breaststroke	34.45	23	Did not advance			
Tessa Ip	100 m breaststroke	1:13.99	17	Did not advance			
Alicia Kok Shun	50 m freestyle	27.29	30	Did not advance			
Alicia Kok Shun	100 m freestyle	1:00.80	37	Did not advance			

== Table tennis ==
Singles

Athletes	Event	Group stage			Round of 32	Round of 16	Quarterfinal	Semifinal	Final / BM	
Athletes	Event	Opposition Score	Opposition Score	Rank	Opposition Score	Opposition Score	Opposition Score	Opposition Score	Opposition Score	Rank
Muhammad Baboolall	Men's singles	Rumgay (SCO); L 0 - 4	Wykes (JEY); L 2 - 4	3	Did not advance					
Brian Chan Yook Fo	Men's singles	Bye			Rumgay (SCO); L 0 - 4	Did not advance				
Akhilen Yogarajah	Men's singles	Maxwell (BAR); W 4 - 0	Mutua (KEN); W 4 - 2	1 Q	Hazin (CAN); L 0 - 4	Did not advance				
Oumehani Hosenally	Women's singles	Seera (UGA); W 4 - 2	Silcock (JEY); L 1 - 4	2	Did not advance					
Nandeshwaree Jalim	Women's singles	Spicer (TTO); W 4 - 0	Hursey (WAL); L 0 - 4	2	Did not advance					
Ruqayyah Kinoo	Women's singles	Bye			Cummings (GUY); L 3 - 4	Did not advance				

Doubles

Athletes	Event	Round of 64	Round of 32	Round of 16	Quarterfinal	Semifinal	Final / BM	
Athletes	Event	Opposition Score	Opposition Score	Opposition Score	Opposition Score	Opposition Score	Opposition Score	Rank
Akhilen Yogarajah; Jason Pontoise	Men's doubles	Bye	Cogill / Nathoo (RSA); L 2 - 3	Did not advance				
Brian Chan Yook Fo; Muhammad Baboolall	Men's doubles	Bye	Britton / Franklin (GUY); L 1 - 3	Did not advance				
Oumehani Hosenally; Nandeshwaree Jalim	Women's doubles	Bye	Malaak / Minal (BAN); W 3 - 0	Batra / Chitale (IND); L 0 - 3	Did not advance			
Ruqayyah Kinoo; Sandhana Yogarajah	Women's doubles	Bye	Wong / Zhou (SGP); L 0 - 3	Did not advance				
Nandeshwaree Jalim; Akhilen Yogarajah	Mixed doubles	Ridoy / Mou (BAN); W 3 - 0	Omotayo / Ojumu (NGR); L 0 - 3	Did not advance				
Oumehani Hosenally; Brian Chan Yook Fo	Mixed doubles	Ahmed / Nazim (MDV); W 3 - 2	Leong / Ho (MAS); L 0 - 3	Did not advance				
Jason Pontoise; Sandhana Desscann	Mixed doubles	Commey / Ankude (GHA); L 2 - 3	Did not advance					

Team

Athletes	Event	Group stage				Quarterfinal	Semifinal	Final / BM	
Athletes	Event	Opposition Score	Opposition Score	Opposition Score	Rank	Opposition Score	Opposition Score	Opposition Score	Rank
Akhilen Yogarajah; Jason Pontoise; Brian Chan Yook Fo; Muhammad Baboolall	Men's team	Canada; L 0 - 3	Malaysia; L 0 - 3	Australia; L 0 - 3	4	Did not advance			
Sandhana Desscann; Ruqayyah Kinoo; Nandeshwaree Jalim; Oumehani Hosenally	Women's team	Maldives; W 3 - 2	Australia; L 0 - 3	Malaysia; L 0 - 3	3	Did not advance			

== Triathlon ==
Two triathletes were selected as of 23 April 2022.

Individual

Athlete	Event	Swim (750 m)	Trans 1	Bike (20 km)	Trans 2	Run (5 km)	Total	Rank
Laurent L'Entêté	Men's	9:42	1:01	28:08	0:25	18:48	58:04	26
Julie Staub	Women's	11:15	1:20	32:47	0:28	19:43	1:05:33	22

== Weightlifting ==
Three weightlifters initially qualified through their positions in the IWF Commonwealth Ranking List (as of 9 March 2022). By 30 March 2022, two additional weightlifters qualified by invitation or reallocation.

Men

Athlete	Event	Weight lifted		Total	Rank
Athlete	Event	Snatch	Clean & jerk	Total	Rank
Willem Emile	55 kg	83	103	186	7
Marc Jonathan Coret	67 kg	105	136	241	8
Cédric Coret	96 kg	141	160	301	7

Women

Athlete	Event	Weight lifted		Total	Rank
Athlete	Event	Snatch	Clean & jerk	Total	Rank
Roilya Ranaivosoa	49 kg	76	96	172	2nd place, silver medalist(s)
Ketty Lent	71 kg	87	107	194	7

== Wrestling ==
Key:

- VT - Victory by Fall.
- PP - Decision by Points - the loser with technical points.
- PO - Decision by Points - the loser without technical points.

Repechage Format

Athlete	Event	Round of 16	Quarterfinal	Semifinal	Repechage	Final / BM	
Athlete	Event	Opposition Result	Opposition Result	Opposition Result	Opposition Result	Opposition Result	Rank
Jean Guyliane Bandou	Men's -65 kg	Bye	Punia (IND); L 0 - 6	Did not advance	Bingham (NRU); L 4 - 6	Did not advance	7
Jean Frederic Marianne	Men's -86 kg	Fernando (SRI); L 0 - 2	Did not advance				11
Kensley Marie	Men's -125 kg	Bye	Anwar (PAK); L 0 - 12	Did not advance	Bye	Kooner (ENG); L 0 - 4	5
Amylee Aza	Women's -68 kg	Bye	Morais (CAN); L 0 - 6	Did not advance	Bye	Ford (NZL); L 0 - 4	5
Marie Vilbrun	Women's -76 kg	—N/a	Nelthorpe (ENG); L 0 - 6	Did not advance			8
