= Table tennis at the 2022 Commonwealth Games – Mixed doubles =

Table tennis – Mixed doubles at the 2022 Commonwealth Games
- Venue: National Exhibition Centre
- Dates: 4−7 August 2022
- Competitors: 100 from 25 nations

Medalists
gold medal	Sharath Kamal; Sreeja Akula	India
silver medal	Javen Choong; Karen Lyne	Malaysia
bronze medal	Clarence Chew; Zeng Jian	Singapore

Table tennis mixed doubles at the 2022 Commonwealth Games were held at the National Exhibition Centre at Birmingham, England from 4 to 7 August 2022. 100 competitors from 25 Commonwealth Nations competed.

== Finals ==
Semifinals
Javen Choong (MAS); Karen Lyne (MAS)	11	5	11	11
Zeng Jian (SGP); Clarence Chew (SGP)	7	11	7	7
Sharath Kamal (IND); Sreeja Akula (IND)	11	11	9	12	11
Nicholas Lum (AUS); Jee Minhyung (AUS)	9	8	11	14	7

Gold medal match
Javen Choong (MAS); Karen Lyne (MAS)	4	11	5	6
Sharath Kamal (IND); Sreeja Akula (IND)	11	9	11	11
Bronze medal match
Zeng Jian (SGP); Clarence Chew (SGP)	11	11	7	14
Nicholas Lum (AUS); Jee Minhyung (AUS)	8	6	11	12

== Top half ==
=== Section 1 ===
Round of 64
Stephen Reilly (FIJ); Touea Titana (FIJ)	11	12	11	5	10
Mick Crea (SEY); Laura Sinon (SEY)	9	14	3	11	12
5	Mohutasin Ahmed Ridoy (BAN); Sadia Rahman Mou (BAN)	4	8	7
Akhilen Yogarajah (MRI); Nandeshwaree Jalim (MRI)	11	11	11
Yan Xin (AUS); Jian Fang Lay (AUS)	7	11	6	6
Javen Choong (MAS); Karen Lyne (MAS)	11	9	11	11
Sam Walker (ENG); Maria Tsaptsinos (ENG)	7	10	11	13	4
Callum Evans (WAL); Charlotte Carey (WAL)	11	12	4	11	11

Round of 32
S Gnanasekaran (IND); Manika Batra (IND)	11	11	11
Mick Crea (SEY); Laura Sinon (SEY)	1	3	1
Akhilen Yogarajah (MRI); Nandeshwaree Jalim (MRI)	4	6	2
Olajide Omotayo (NGR); Ajoke Ojomu (NGR)	11	11	11
Chetan Ooka Nathoo (RSA); Danisha Jayavant Patel (RSA)	4	8	7
Javen Choong (MAS); Karen Lyne (MAS)	11	11	11
Callum Evans (WAL); Charlotte Carey (WAL)	8	6	6
Eugene Wang (CAN); Zhang Mo (CAN)	11	11	11

Round of 16
S Gnanasekaran (IND); Manika Batra (IND)	11	11	11
Olajide Omotayo (NGR); Ajoke Ojomu (NGR)	7	6	7
Javen Choong (MAS); Karen Lyne (MAS)	11	9	11	11
Eugene Wang (CAN); Zhang Mo (CAN)	2	11	6	7

Quarterfinals
S Gnanasekaran (IND); Manika Batra (IND)	10	11	11	7	7
Javen Choong (MAS); Karen Lyne (MAS)	12	9	8	11	11

=== Section 2 ===
Round of 64
Emmanuel Commey (GHA); Millicent Ankude (GHA)	9	11	11	2	11
Jason Pontoise (MRI); Sandhana Desscann (MRI)	11	9	4	11	9
Derron Douglas (TTO); Rheann Chung (TTO)	9	8	11	11	9
Colin Dalgeish (SCO); Rebecca Plaistow (SCO)	11	11	5	7	11
Sanil Shetty (IND); Reeth Tennison (IND)	6	10	13	11	8
Wong Qi Shen (MAS); Tee Ai Xin (MAS)	11	12	11	8	11
Shemar Britton (GUY); Chelsea Edghill (GUY)	7	11	11	11
Gary Nuopula (SOL); Connie Sifi (SOL)	11	4	2	4
Vicky Wu (FIJ); Grace Rosi Yee (FIJ)	11	11	5	14
Brian Mutua (KEN); Jenny Compell Amadi (KEN)	7	9	11	12

Round of 32
Bode Abiodun (NGR); Fatima Atinuke Bello (NGR)	11	11	11
Emmanuel Commey (GHA); Millicent Ankude (GHA)	5	5	5
Colin Dalgeish (SCO); Rebecca Plaistow (SCO)	5	6	10
Finn Luu (AUS); Liu Yangzi (AUS)	11	11	12
Shemar Britton (GUY); Chelsea Edghill (GUY)	4	4	11	2
Wong Qi Shen (MAS); Tee Ai Xin (MAS)	11	11	8	11
Vicky Wu (FIJ); Grace Rosi Yee (FIJ)	3	3	3
Zeng Jian (SGP); Clarence Chew (SGP)	11	11	11

Round of 16
Bode Abiodun (NGR); Fatima Atinuke Bello (NGR)	7	10	7
Finn Luu (AUS); Liu Yangzi (AUS)	11	12	11
Wong Qi Shen (MAS); Tee Ai Xin (MAS)	7	6	9
Zeng Jian (SGP); Clarence Chew (SGP)	11	11	11

Quarterfinals
Finn Luu (AUS); Liu Yangzi (AUS)	8	14	7
Zeng Jian (SGP); Clarence Chew (SGP)	11	16	11

== Bottom half ==
=== Section 3 ===
Round of 64
Izaac Quek Yong (SGP); Zhou Jingyi (SGP)	11	11	11
Shaun Jones (RSA); Musfiquh Kalam (RSA)	6	6	3
Marios Yiangou (CYP); Foteini Meletie (CYP)	9	11	11	9
Jordan Wykes (JEY); Hannah Silcock (JEY)	11	7	13	11
Jonathan van Lange (GUY); Thuraia Thomas (GUY)	7	5	7
Leong Chee Feng (MAS); Ho Ying (MAS)	11	11	11
Moosa Munsif Ahmed (MDV); Aishath Rafa Nazim (MDV)	5	11	3	11	6
Brian Chan Yook Fo (MRI); Oumehani Hosenally (MRI)	11	7	11	6	11
Owen Cathcart (NIR); Sophie Earley (NIR)	11	11	11
Godfrey Sultan (SEY); Christy Bristol (SEY)	4	4	6

Round of 32
Liam Pitchford (ENG); Tin-Tin Ho (ENG)	11	11	8	7	11
Izaac Quek Yong (SGP); Zhou Jingyi (SGP)	7	6	11	11	7
Jordan Wykes (JEY); Hannah Silcock (JEY)	8	7	8
Edward Ly (CAN); Sophie Gauthier (CAN)	11	11	11
Leong Chee Feng (MAS); Ho Ying (MAS)	11	11	11
Brian Chan Yook Fo (MRI); Oumehani Hosenally (MRI)	3	4	1
Owen Cathcart (NIR); Sophie Earley (NIR)	7	8	9
Sharath Kamal (IND); Sreeja Akula (IND)	11	11	11

Round of 16
Liam Pitchford (ENG); Tin-Tin Ho (ENG)	11	11	11
Edward Ly (CAN); Sophie Gauthier (CAN)	7	9	2
Leong Chee Feng (MAS); Ho Ying (MAS)	11	2	6	5
Sharath Kamal (IND); Sreeja Akula (IND)	5	11	11	11

Quarterfinals
Liam Pitchford (ENG); Tin-Tin Ho (ENG)	7	11	8	13	9
Sharath Kamal (IND); Sreeja Akula (IND)	11	8	11	11	11

=== Section 4 ===
Round of 64
Derek Abrefa (GHA); Cynthia Kwabi (GHA)	11	9	11	11
Kane Watson (JAM); Solesha Young (JAM)	7	11	8	1
Theo Cogill (RSA); Zodwa Maphanga (RSA)	w	/	o
Mufradul Hamza (BAN); Sonam Sultana (BAN)
Christopher Franklin (GUY); Natalie Cummings (GUY)	11	11	11
Jai Chauhan (FIJ); Carolyn Li (FIJ)	6	4	8
Tom Jarvis (ENG); Charlotte Bardsley (ENG)	12	11	11
Geoffrey Loi (PNG); Tammi Agari (PNG)	10	5	8

Round of 32
Derek Abrefa (GHA); Cynthia Kwabi (GHA)	w	/	o
Quadri Aruna (NGR); Offiong Edem (NGR)
Theo Cogill (RSA); Zodwa Maphanga (RSA)	11	0	1	7
Nicholas Lum (AUS); Jee Minhyung (AUS)	7	11	11	11
Jeremy Hazin (CAN); Fu Ching Nam (CAN)	11	11	11
Christopher Franklin (GUY); Natalie Cummings (GUY)	3	8	4
Tom Jarvis (ENG); Charlotte Bardsley (ENG)	8	8	11	11	11
Pang Yew En Koen (SGP); Wong Xin Ru (SGP)	11	11	6	9	6

Round of 16
Derek Abrefa (GHA); Cynthia Kwabi (GHA)	4	3	5
Nicholas Lum (AUS); Jee Minhyung (AUS)	11	11	11
Jeremy Hazin (CAN); Fu Ching Nam (CAN)	11	10	7	13	8
Tom Jarvis (ENG); Charlotte Bardsley (ENG)	8	12	11	11	11

Quarterfinals
Nicholas Lum (AUS); Jee Minhyung (AUS)	11	11	11
Tom Jarvis (ENG); Charlotte Bardsley (ENG)	6	7	9
