= Seychelles at the 2022 Commonwealth Games =

- Flag of Seychelles
- CG code: SEY
- CGA: Seychelles Olympic and Commonwealth Games Association

in Birmingham, England 28 July 2022 – 8 August 2022
- Competitors: 27 (20 men and 7 women) in 8 sports
- Flag bearers (opening): Keddy Agnes; Natasha Chetty
- Flag bearer (closing): TBD
- Medals: Gold 0 Silver 0 Bronze 0 Total 0

Commonwealth Games appearances (overview)
- 1990; 1994; 1998; 2002; 2006; 2010; 2014; 2018; 2022; 2026; 2030

Seychelles competed at the 2022 Commonwealth Games in Birmingham, England between 28 July and 8 August 2022. It was the ninth time that Seychelles competes at the Games.

Boxer Keddy Agnes and athlete Natasha Chetty were the country's flagbearers during the opening ceremony.

== Competitors ==
The following is the list of the number of competitors participating in the Games per sport/discipline.

Sport	Men	Women	Total
Athletics	5	1	6
Boxing	3	0	3
Cycling	3	0	3
Judo	2	0	2
Squash	1	0	1
Swimming	4	2	6
Table tennis	2	2	4
Weightlifting	0	2	2
Total	20	7	27

== Athletics ==
Men
Track and road events

Athlete	Event	Heat		Semi-final		Final	
Athlete	Event	Result	Rank	Result	Rank	Result	Rank
Denzel Adem	100 m	10.70	6	Did not advance			
Sharry Dodin	100 m	DNS		Did not advance			
Dylan Sicobo	100 m	10.74	4	Did not advance			
Denzel Adem	200 m	21.51	5	Did not advance			
Iven Moise	1500 m	3:57.73	10	—N/a		Did not advance	
Ned Azemia	400 m hurdles	51.27	5 q	—N/a		51.71	7

Women
Field events

Athlete	Event	Qualification		Final	
Athlete	Event	Distance	Rank	Distance	Rank
Natasha Chetty	High jump	1.76	13	Did not advance	

== Boxing ==
Men

Athlete	Event	Round of 32	Round of 16	Quarterfinals	Semi-finals	Final	
Athlete	Event	Opposition Result	Opposition Result	Opposition Result	Opposition Result	Opposition Result	Rank
Fabio Roselie	Light welterweight	Polkinghorn (AUS); L KO	Did not advance				
Shain Boniface	Light middleweight	Clair (MRI); L 0 – 5	Did not advance				
Keddy Agnes	Super heavyweight	—N/a	Bye	Ahlawat (IND); L 0 – 5	Did not advance		

== Cycling ==
=== Road ===
Men

Athlete	Event	Time	Rank
Stephen Belle	Road race	DNF	
Mario Ernesta	Road race	DNF	
Yohan Monthy	Road race	DNF	
Mario Ernesta	Time trial	1:04:43.81	52
Yohan Monthy	Time trial	1:03:41.19	49

=== Track ===
Scratch race

Athlete	Event	Qualification	Final
Stephen Belle	Men's scratch race	DNF	Did not advance

== Judo ==
A squad of two judoka was entered as of 7 July 2022.

Men

Athlete	Event	Round of 16	Quarterfinals	Semi-finals	Repechage	Final/BM	
Athlete	Event	Opposition Result	Opposition Result	Opposition Result	Opposition Result	Opposition Result	Rank
Jean Michel Vidot	-66 kg	Katz (AUS); L 00 – 10	Did not advance				9
Dominic Dugasse	+100 kg	Moore (JAM); W 10 – 00	Andrews (NZL); L 01 – 10	Did not advance	Afude (KEN); W 10 – 00	Park (AUS); L 00 – 10	5

== Squash ==
Athlete	Event	Round of 64	Round of 32	Round of 16	Quarterfinals	Semi-finals	Final	
Athlete	Event	Opposition Score	Opposition Score	Opposition Score	Opposition Score	Opposition Score	Opposition Score	Rank
Marcus Adela	Men's singles	Kawooya (UGA); L 0 – 3	Did not advance					

== Swimming ==
Men

Athlete	Event	Heat		Semi-final		Final	
Athlete	Event	Time	Rank	Time	Rank	Time	Rank
Mathieu Bachmann	50 m freestyle	24.71	45	Did not advance			
Adam Moncherry	50 m freestyle	24.10	30	Did not advance			
Mathieu Bachmann	100 m freestyle	53.72	46	Did not advance			
Tyler Fred	100 m freestyle	53.79	47	Did not advance			
Adam Moncherry	100 m freestyle	52.59	34	Did not advance			
Tyler Fred	200 m freestyle	1:58.46	30	—N/a		Did not advance	
Tyler Fred	50 m backstroke	28.05	33	Did not advance			
Tyler Fred	100 m backstroke	1:02.14	32	Did not advance			
Mathieu Bachmann	50 m butterfly	26.16	39	Did not advance			
Tyler Fred	50 m butterfly	25.84	32	Did not advance			
Adam Moncherry	50 m butterfly	25.67	30	Did not advance			
Mathieu Bachmann	100 m butterfly	57.55	35	Did not advance			
Adam Moncherry	100 m butterfly	57.22	34	Did not advance			
Simon Bachmann	200 m butterfly	2:09.25	15	—N/a		Did not advance	
Simon Bachmann	200 m individual medley	2:11.96	18	—N/a		Did not advance	
Adam Moncherry; Tyler Fred; Simon Bachmann; Mathieu Bachmann	4 × 100 m freestyle relay	3:35.78	11	—N/a		Did not advance	
	4 × 100 m medley relay	Did not start		—N/a		Did not advance	

Women

Athlete	Event	Heat		Semi-final		Final	
Athlete	Event	Time	Rank	Time	Rank	Time	Rank
Aaliyah Palestrini	50 m freestyle	28.98	54	Did not advance			
Aaliyah Palestrini	100 m freestyle	1:02.51	46	Did not advance			
Aaliyah Palestrini	400 m freestyle	4:59.62	21	—N/a		Did not advance	
Aaliyah Palestrini	50 m backstroke	32.02	23	Did not advance			
Aaliyah Palestrini	50 m butterfly	31.24	43	Did not advance			
Therese Soukup	50 m freestyle	28.60	50	Did not advance			
Therese Soukup	100 m freestyle	1:02.09	45	Did not advance			
Therese Soukup	200 m freestyle	2:17.89	25	—N/a		Did not advance	
Therese Soukup	50 m backstroke	32.95	27	Did not advance			

Mixed

Athlete	Event	Heat		Final	
Athlete	Event	Time	Rank	Time	Rank
Therese Soukup; Aaliyah Palestrini; Simon Bachmann; Adam Moncherry	4 × 100 m freestyle relay	3:54.21	16	Did not advance	

== Table tennis ==
Four players were selected. Godfrey Sultan qualified via the ITTF World Singles Rankings, whereas the other three players received Bipartite Invitations.

Singles

Athletes	Event	Group stage			Round of 32	Round of 16	Quarterfinal	Semi-final	Final / BM	
Athletes	Event	Opposition Score	Opposition Score	Rank	Opposition Score	Opposition Score	Opposition Score	Opposition Score	Opposition Score	Rank
Mick Crea	Men's singles	Evans (WAL); L 0 – 4	Elia (CYP); L 0 – 4	3	Did not advance					
Godfrey Sultan	Men's singles	McCreery (NIR); L 1 – 4	Elia (CYP); L 3 -4	3	Did not advance					
Christy Bristol	Women's singles	Earley (NIR); L 0 – 4	Greaves (GUY); W 4 – 2	2	Did not advance					
Laura Sinon	Women's singles	Nakhumitsa (UGA); L 0 – 4	Nazim (MDV); L 0 – 4	3	Did not advance					

Doubles

Athletes	Event	Round of 64	Round of 32	Round of 16	Quarterfinal	Semi-final	Final / BM	
Athletes	Event	Opposition Score	Opposition Score	Opposition Score	Opposition Score	Opposition Score	Opposition Score	Rank
Mick Crea; Godfrey Sultan	Men's doubles	Bye	Pang / Quek (SGP); L 0 – 3	Did not advance				
Laura Sinon; Christy Bristol	Women's doubles	Bye	Carey / Hursey (WAL); L 0 – 3	Did not advance				
Godfrey Sultan; Christy Bristol	Mixed doubles	Cathcart / Earley (NIR); L 0 – 3	Did not advance					
Mick Crea; Laura Sinon	Mixed doubles	Reilly / Titana (FIJ); W 3 – 2	Gnanasekaran / Batra (IND); L 0 – 3	Did not advance				

== Weightlifting ==
Two weightlifters were selected. Clementina Agricole qualified via the IWF Commonwealth Ranking List, whereas Romentha Larue was awarded a Bipartite Invitation.

Athlete	Event	Weight lifted		Total	Rank
Athlete	Event	Snatch	Clean & jerk	Total	Rank
Clementina Agricole	Women's 59 kg	No Mark	DNS	DNF	
Romentha Larue	Women's 87 kg	78	98	176	9
