= 2021 AIBA World Boxing Championships – Light welterweight =

Boxing competition in Belgrade, Serbia

Light welterweight at the 2021 AIBA World Boxing Championships
- Venue: Štark Arena
- Location: Belgrade, Serbia
- Dates: 26 October – 6 November
- Competitors: 44 from 44 nations

Medalists
gold medal	Andy Cruz	Cuba
silver medal	Kerem Özmen	Turkey
bronze medal	Reese Lynch	Scotland
bronze medal	Hovhannes Bachkov	Armenia

The Light welterweight competition at the 2021 AIBA World Boxing Championships was held between 26 October and 6 November.

== Results ==
=== Finals ===
Semifinals
(Turkey) Kerem Özmen	5
(Scotland) Reese Lynch	0
(Cuba) Andy Cruz	5
(Armenia) Hovhannes Bachkov	0

Final
(Turkey) Kerem Özmen	0
(Cuba) Andy Cruz	5

=== Top half ===
==== Section 1 ====
First round
(Germany) David Gkevorgkian	0
(Serbia) Pavel Fedorov	5
(Nepal) Bhupendra Thapa	0
(France) Lounes Hamraoui	5
(India) Shiva Thapa	5
(Kenya) Victor Nyadera	0

Second round
(Turkey) Kerem Özmen	4
(Serbia) Pavel Fedorov	0
(Hungary) Richárd Kovács	5
(Mexico) César Morales	0
(Slovenia) Nik Nikolov	0
(France) Lounes Hamraoui	5
(India) Shiva Thapa	5
(Sierra Leone) John Brown	0

Third round
(Turkey) Kerem Özmen	5
(Hungary) Richárd Kovács	0
(France) Lounes Hamraoui	1
(India) Shiva Thapa	4

Quarterfinals
(Turkey) Kerem Özmen	5
(India) Shiva Thapa	0

==== Section 2 ====
First round
(Estonia) Mark Andrejev	0
(Spain) Adrián Thiam	5
(Lithuania) Modestas Žmuidina	0
(Iran) Ashkan Rezaei	5
(South Korea) Lee Jong-seung	1
(Croatia) Matteo Komadina	4

Second round
(Cyprus) Alexandros Christodoulou	0
(Spain) Adrián Thiam	5
(Iran) Ashkan Rezaei	1
(Scotland) Reese Lynch	4
(Kazakhstan) Sanatali Toltayev	5
(Moldova) Vasile Cebotari	0
(Croatia) Matteo Komadina	0
(Ukraine) Denys Pesotskyy	5

Third round
(Spain) Adrián Thiam	0
(Scotland) Reese Lynch	5
(Kazakhstan) Sanatali Toltayev	5
(Ukraine) Denys Pesotskyy	0

Quarterfinals
(Scotland) Reese Lynch	3
(Kazakhstan) Sanatali Toltayev	2

=== Bottom half ===
==== Section 3 ====
First round
(Panama) Jonathan Miniel	0
(Cuba) Andy Cruz	5
(Kyrgyzstan) Zhantoro Tashiev	0
(Japan) Taiga Imanaga	5
(Mongolia) Battömöriin Misheelt	5
(Greece) Vasileios Makrygiannis	0

Second round
(Brazil) Nicollás de Jesús	0
(Cuba) Andy Cruz	5
(United States) Vershaun Lee	KO
(Trinidad and Tobago) Blessing Waldropt
(Uzbekistan) Mujibillo Tursunov	5
(Japan) Taiga Imanaga	0
(Mongolia) Battömöriin Misheelt	1
(Chinese Taipei) Lai Chu-en	4

Third round
(Cuba) Andy Cruz	5
(United States) Vershaun Lee	0
(Uzbekistan) Mujibillo Tursunov	3
(Chinese Taipei) Lai Chu-en	2

Quarterfinals
(Cuba) Andy Cruz	3
(Uzbekistan) Mujibillo Tursunov	2

==== Section 4 ====
First round
(Italy) Gianluigi Malanga	5
(Republic of Ireland) Brandon McCarthy	0
(Azerbaijan) Malik Hasanov	5
(Guatemala) Juan Reyes	0
(Israel) Ahmad Shtiwi	0
Somchay Wongsuwan	5

Second round
(Colombia) José Viáfara	1
(Italy) Gianluigi Malanga	4
(Azerbaijan) Malik Hasanov	1
(Armenia) Hovhannes Bachkov	3
(Tajikistan) Bakhodur Usmonov	3
Ilia Shakirov	2
Somchay Wongsuwan	5
Ali Reza Ahmadi	0

Third round
(Italy) Gianluigi Malanga	2
(Armenia) Hovhannes Bachkov	3
(Tajikistan) Bakhodur Usmonov	1
Somchay Wongsuwan	4

Quarterfinals
(Armenia) Hovhannes Bachkov	2 (Note: The original decision was 3:2 in favour of Somchay Wongsuwan. Upon appeal by the Armenian Boxing Federation, a bout review jury reviewed and overturned said decision.)
Somchay Wongsuwan	3
