= Bangladesh at the 2022 Commonwealth Games =

- Flag of Bangladesh
- CG code: BAN
- CGA: Bangladesh Olympic Association
- Website: nocban.org

in Birmingham, England 28 July 2022 – 8 August 2022
- Competitors: 30 (19 men and 11 women) in 7 sports
- Flag bearers: Sura Krishna Chakma; Mabia Akhter
- Medals: Gold 0 Silver 0 Bronze 0 Total 0

Commonwealth Games appearances (overview)
- 1978; 1982–1986; 1990; 1994; 1998; 2002; 2006; 2010; 2014; 2018; 2022; 2026; 2030

Bangladesh competed at the 2022 Commonwealth Games in Birmingham, England, but did not win any medals. It was the team's tenth appearance at the Commonwealth Games.

Boxer Sura Krishna Chakma and weightlifter Mabia Akhter were the country's flagbearers during the opening ceremony.

== Competitors ==
The following is the number of Bangladeshi competitors participating at the games per sport/discipline.

Sport	Men	Women	Total
Athletics	3	2	5
Boxing	3	0	3
Gymnastics	3	0	3
Swimming	3	2	5
Table tennis	4	2	6
Weightlifting	1	3	4
Wrestling	2	2	4
Total	19	11	30

== Athletics ==
Men
Track and road events

Athlete	Event	Heat		Semifinal		Final	
Athlete	Event	Result	Rank	Result	Rank	Result	Rank
Imranur Rahman	100 m	10.46	3	did not advance			
Rakibul Hasan	200 m	22.46	7	did not advance			

Field events

Athlete	Event	Final	
Athlete	Event	Distance	Rank
Mahfuzur Rahman	High jump	2.10 SB	11

Women
Track and road events

Athlete	Event	Heat		Semifinal		Final	
Athlete	Event	Result	Rank	Result	Rank	Result	Rank
Sumaya Dewan	100 m	12.42 PB	7	did not advance			

Field events

Athlete	Event	Qualification		Final	
Athlete	Event	Distance	Rank	Distance	Rank
Ummay Rumky	High jump	1.66	18	did not advance	

== Boxing ==
Men

Athlete	Event	Round of 32	Round of 16	Quarterfinals	Semifinals	Final	
Athlete	Event	Opposition Result	Opposition Result	Opposition Result	Opposition Result	Opposition Result	Rank
Salim Hossain	Featherweight	Bye	Hussamuddin (IND); L 0―5	did not advance			
Sura Krishna Chakma	Light welterweight	Rokobuli (FIJ); L WO	did not advance				
Hossan Ali	Welterweight	Bye	Kibira (UGA); L 0―5	did not advance			

== Gymnastics ==
=== Artistic ===
Team Final & Individual Qualification

Athlete	Event	Apparatus						Total	Rank
Athlete	Event	F	PH	R	V	PB	HB	Total	Rank
Shishir Ahmed	Team	9.100	2.100	4.600	11.950	6.500	2.950	37.200	23
Ali Kader Haque	Team	11.800	—N/a		13.700	—N/a			
Abu Rafi	Team	10.050	7.000	3.000	11.950	5.900	—N/a		
Total	Team	30.950	9.100	7.600	37.600	12.400	2.950	100.600	9

== Swimming ==
Men

Athlete	Event	Heat		Semi Final		Final	
Athlete	Event	Time	Rank	Time	Rank	Time	Rank
Asif Reza	50 m freestyle	24.67	44	did not advance			
Asif Reza	100 m freestyle	54.24	50	Did not advance			
Sukumar Rajbonashi	50 m breaststroke	29.96	30	Did not advance			
Sukumar Rajbonashi	100 m breaststroke	1:07.92	30	Did not advance			
Mahamudun Nobi Nahid	50 m butterfly	26.25	41	Did not advance			
Mahamudun Nobi Nahid	100 m butterfly	56.78	26	Did not advance			

Women

Athlete	Event	Heat		Semifinal		Final	
Athlete	Event	Time	Rank	Time	Rank	Time	Rank
Sonia Khatun	50 m freestyle	30.22	61	Did not advance			
Sonia Khatun	50 m butterfly	30.94	42	Did not advance			
Morium Akter	50 m breaststroke	37.90	30	Did not advance			
Morium Akter	100 m breaststroke	1:20.37	24	did not advance			

== Table tennis ==
Bangladesh qualified a men's team for the table tennis competitions.

Singles

Athletes	Event	Group stage				Round of 32	Round of 16	Quarterfinal	Semifinal	Final / BM	
Athletes	Event	Opposition Score	Opposition Score	Opposition Score	Rank	Opposition Score	Opposition Score	Opposition Score	Opposition Score	Opposition Score	Rank
Ramhimlian Bawm	Men's singles	Cathcart (NIR); L 0―4	Britton (GUY); L 1―4	—N/a	3	did not advance					
Mohutasin Ridoy	Men's singles	Douglas (TTO); W 4―2	Khawaja (PAK); L 1―4	Franklin (GUY); L 1―4	3	did not advance					
Rifat Sabbir	Men's singles	M.Ahmed (MDV); W 4―3	Abrefa (GHA); L 0―4	—N/a	2	did not advance					
Sadia Mou	Women's singles	Abel (VAN); W 4―0	Oribamise (NGR); L 0―4	—N/a	2	did not advance					
Sonam Sultana	Women's singles	Sifi (SOL); W 4―0	Morin (CAN); L 0―4	—N/a	2	did not advance					

Doubles

Athletes	Event	Round of 64	Round of 32	Round of 16	Quarterfinal	Semifinal	Final / BM	
Athletes	Event	Opposition Score	Opposition Score	Opposition Score	Opposition Score	Opposition Score	Opposition Score	Rank
Mufradul Hamza; Rifat Sabbir	Men's doubles	Bye	Omeh / Omotayo (NGR); L 0–3	did not advance				
Mohutasin Ridoy; Ramhimlian Bawm	Men's doubles	Bye	Chauhan / Wu (FIJ); W 3–0	Kamal / Gnanasekaran (IND); L 0–3	did not advance			
Sonam Sultana; Sadia Mou	Women's doubles	Bye	Ho / Maria (ENG); L 0–3	did not advance				
Mohutasin Ridoy; Sadia Mou	Mixed doubles	Akhilen / Jalim (MRI); L 0–3	did not advance					
Sonam Sultana; Mufradul Hamza	Mixed doubles	Theo / Zodwa (RSA); L 0–3	did not advance					

Team

Athletes	Event	Group stage				Quarterfinal	Semifinal	Final / BM	
Athletes	Event	Opposition Score	Opposition Score	Opposition Score	Rank	Opposition Score	Opposition Score	Opposition Score	Rank
Ramhimlian Bawm; Mufradul Hamza; Mohutasin Ridoy; Rifat Sabbir	Men's team	Fiji (FIJ); W 3―0	Guyana (GUY); W 3―2	England (ENG); L 0–3	2Q	India (IND); L 0–3	Did not advance		

== Weightlifting ==
Two weightlifters qualified through their positions in the IWF Commonwealth Ranking List (as of 9 March 2022).

Athlete	Event	Weight Lifted		Total	Rank
Athlete	Event	Snatch	Clean & jerk	Total	Rank
Ashikur Rahman Taj	Men's -55 kg	93 kg	118 kg	211 kg	5
Marjia Ekra	Women's -49 kg	58 kg	NM	DNF	
Mabia Akhter	Women's -64 kg	78 kg	103 kg	181 kg	8
Monira Kazi	Women's -76 kg	75 kg	95 kg	170 kg	9

== Wrestling ==
Key:

- VT - Victory by Fall.
- PP - Decision by Points - the loser with technical points.
- PO - Decision by Points - the loser without technical points.

Athlete	Event	Round of 16	Quarterfinal	Semifinal	Repechage	Final / BM	
Athlete	Event	Opposition Result	Opposition Result	Opposition Result	Opposition Result	Opposition Result	Rank
Abdur Roshid Hawladar	Men's -86 kg	S.Kessegbama (SLE); L 0-4 (VFA)	did not advance				
Liton Biswas	Men's -125 kg	A.Johnson (JAM); L 0-11 (VSU)	did not advance				
Dola Khatun	Women's -62 kg	—N/a	B.Ettane Ngolle (CMR); L 0-10 (VSU)	did not advance			
Tithy Roy	Women's -68 kg	Bye	T.Cocker Lemalie (TGA); L 0-10 (VSU)	did not advance			
