= Reese Lynch =

Scottish boxer (born 2001)

Personal information
- Nickname: Reecko
- Born: 20 July 2001 (age 25) Fauldhouse, Scotland
- Weight: Super lightweight

Boxing career

Boxing record
- Total fights: 3
- Wins: 3
- Win by KO: 1
Medal record
Men's amateur boxing
Representing Scotland
IBA World Championships
Bronze medal – third place	2021 Belgrade	Light welterweight
Commonwealth Games
Gold medal – first place	2022 Birmingham	Light welterweight

Reese Lynch (born 20 July 2001) is a Scottish professional boxer. As an amateur, he won a gold medal at the 2022 Commonwealth Games as well as winning a bronze medal at the 2021 AIBA World Boxing Championships.

== Amateur career ==
=== Commonwealth Games result ===
Birmingham 2022

- Preliminaries: Defeated Timon Aaree (Kiribati) RSC
- Round of 16: Defeated Shiva Thapa (India) 4–1
- Quarter finals: Defeated Jonas Jonas (Namibia) 5–0
- Semi finals: Defeated Wyatt Sanford (Canada) 5–0
- Final: Defeated Richarno Colin (Mauritius) 4–1

=== World Championship result ===
Belgrade 2021

- Second round: Defeated Ashkan Rezaei (Iran) 4–1
- Third round: Defeated Adrián Thiam (Spain) 5–0
- Quarter-final: Defeated Sanatali Toltayev (Kazakhstan) 3–2
- Semi-final: Defeated by Kerem Özmen (Turkey) 5–0

== Professional career ==
=== Early career ===
Lynch made his professional debut on 24 May 2025, in a bout against Jonatas Rodrigo Gomes de Oliveira. Lynch was able to secure the win after stopping his opponent in the second round.

In his second professional fight, Lynch defeated Jakub Laskowski on points over six rounds at Braehead Arena in Glasgow on 4 October 2025.

== Professional boxing record ==
3 fights	3 wins	0 losses
By knockout	1	0
By decision	2	0

No.	Result	Record	Opponent	Type	Round, time	Date	Location	Notes
3	Win	3–0	Dan Booth	PTS	6	28 Feb 2026	Valliant Live, Derby, England	
2	Win	2–0	Jakub Laskowski	PTS	6	4 Oct 2025	Braehead Arena, Glasgow, Scotland	
1	Win	1–0	Jonatas Rodrigo Gomes de Oliveira	KO	2 (4), 3:07	24 May 2025	OVO Hydro, Glasgow, Scotland	
