= Boxing at the 2022 Commonwealth Games – Men's light welterweight =

Boxing competitions

Boxing – Men's light welterweight at the 2022 Commonwealth Games
- Venue: National Exhibition Centre Hall 4
- Dates: July 29 – 7 August 2022
- Competitors: 29 from 29 nations

Medalists
gold medal	Reese Lynch	Scotland
silver medal	Richarno Colin	Mauritius
bronze medal	Wyatt Sanford	Canada
bronze medal	Abdul Omar	Ghana

The men's light welterweight boxing competitions at the 2022 Commonwealth Games in Birmingham, England took place between July 29 and August 7 at National Exhibition Centre Hall 4. Light welterweights were limited to those boxers weighing less than 63.5 kilograms.

Like all Commonwealth boxing events, the competition was a straight single-elimination tournament. Both semifinal losers were awarded bronze medals, so no boxers competed again after their first loss. Bouts consisted of three rounds of three minutes each, with one-minute breaks between rounds.

== Schedule ==
The schedule is as follows:

Date	Round
Friday 29 July	Preliminaries
Sunday 31 July	Preliminaries
Wednesday 3 August	Quarter-finals
Saturday 6 August	Semi-finals
Sunday 7 August 2022	Final

== Results ==
The draw is as follows:

=== Finals ===
Final
Reese Lynch (SCO)	4
Richarno Colin (MRI)	1

=== Top half ===
Preliminaries
Jonas Jonas (NAM)	RSC
Colan Caleb (NRU)
Timon Aaree (KIR)
Reese Lynch (SCO)	RSC
Shiva Thapa (IND)	5
Suleman Baloch (PAK)	0
De Niro Pau (NIU)
Wyatt Sanford (CAN)	RSC
Qhobosheane Mohlerepe (LES)	5
Odysseas Atmatzidis (CYP)	0
Joshua Tukamuhebwa (UGA)	3
John Paul Hale (NIR)	2
Fabio Roselie (SEY)
Billy Polkinghorn (AUS)	KO

Round of 16
Rashield Williams (BAH)	0
Jonas Jonas (NAM)	5
Reese Lynch (SCO)	4
Shiva Thapa (IND)	1
Wyatt Sanford (CAN)	5
Qhobosheane Mohlerepe (LES)	0
Joshua Tukamuhebwa (UGA)	4
Billy Polkinghorn (AUS)	1

Quarterfinals
Jonas Jonas (NAM)	0
Reese Lynch (SCO)	5
Wyatt Sanford (CAN)	4
Joshua Tukamuhebwa (UGA)	1

Semifinals
Reese Lynch (SCO)	5
Wyatt Sanford (CAN)	0

=== Bottom half ===
Preliminaries
Richarno Colin (MRI)	5
Tom Frame (JEY)	0
Joe Tyers (ENG)	5
Sanjeewa Bandara (SRI)	0
Elias Bonzo (MAW)	1
John Ume (PNG)	4
Elia Rokobuli (FIJ)	WO
Sura Chakma (BAN)
Abdul Omar (GHA)	4
Jamie Devine (IOM)	1
Alex Isendi (TAN)	0
Alston Ryan (ANT)	5

Round of 16
Colin Lewis (GUY)
Richarno Colin (MRI)	RSC
Joe Tyers (ENG)	RSC-I
John Ume (PNG)
Elia Rokobuli (FIJ)
Abdul Omar (GHA)	RSC
Alston Ryan (ANT)	5
John Browne (SLE)	0

Quarterfinals
Richarno Colin (MRI)	4
Joe Tyers (ENG)	1
Abdul Omar (GHA)	4
Alston Ryan (ANT)	1

Semifinals
Richarno Colin (MRI)	5
Abdul Omar (GHA)	0
