= Solomon Islands at the 2022 Commonwealth Games =

- Flag of Solomon Islands
- CGF code: SOL
- CGA: National Olympic Committee of Solomon Islands
- Website: facebook.com/NOCSI19 (Facebook)

in Birmingham, England 28 July 2022 – 8 August 2022
- Competitors: 20 (11 men and 9 women) in 8 sports
- Medals: Gold 0 Silver 0 Bronze 0 Total 0

Commonwealth Games appearances (overview)
- 1982; 1986; 1990; 1994; 1998; 2002; 2006; 2010; 2014; 2018; 2022; 2026; 2030

Solomon Islands competed at the 2022 Commonwealth Games in Birmingham, England between 28 July and 8 August 2022. It was the team's tenth appearance at the Games.

== Competitors ==
The following is the list of number of competitors participating at the Games per sport/discipline.

Sport	Men	Women	Total
Athletics	4	2	6
Beach volleyball	0	2	2
Boxing	1	0	1
Judo	1	0	1
Swimming	2	1	3
Table tennis	1	2	3
Triathlon	1	1	2
Weightlifting	1	1	2
Total	11	9	20

== Athletics ==
Men
Track and road events

Athlete	Event	Heat		Semifinal		Final	
Athlete	Event	Result	Rank	Result	Rank	Result	Rank
Paul Ma'Unikeni	100 m	DNS		did not advance			
James Mebupe	200 m	23.56	7	did not advance			
Rosefelo Siosi	5000 m	—				17:26.93	18
Martin Faeni	Marathon	—				2:50:40	18

Women
Track and road events

Athlete	Event	Final	
Athlete	Event	Result	Rank
Dianah Matekali	5000 m	19:06.80	22
Sharon Firisua	Marathon	3:02:07	15

== Beach volleyball ==
As of 26 April 2022, Solomon Islands qualified for the women's tournament. The intended Oceania qualifier was abandoned, so the quota allocation was determined by their position among other nations from Oceania in the women's FIVB Beach Volleyball World Rankings (for performances between 16 April 2018 and 31 March 2022).

Athletes	Event	Preliminary Round				Quarterfinals	Semifinals	Final / BM	Rank
Athletes	Event	Opposition Score	Opposition Score	Opposition Score	Rank	Opposition Score	Opposition Score	Opposition Score	Rank
Rose Gwali; Hannah Donga	Women's	Grimson / Mumby (ENG); L 0 - 2	Pata / Toko (VAN); L 0 - 2	Beattie / Coutts (SCO); L 0 - 2	4	did not advance			

=== Women's tournament ===
Group C

Pos	Team	Pld	W	L	Pts	SW	SL	SR	SPW	SPL	SPR	Qualification
1	Pata – Toko (VAN)	3	3	0	6	6	0	MAX	126	67	1.881	Quarterfinals
2	Grimson – Mumby (ENG)	3	2	1	5	4	2	2.000	112	90	1.244	Quarterfinals
3	Beattie – Coutts (SCO)	3	1	2	4	2	4	0.500	98	106	0.925	Ranking of third-placed teams
4	Gwali – Donga (SOL)	3	0	3	3	0	6	0.000	53	126	0.421	

Source: birmingham2022.com

31 July 2022; 19:00	Grimson – Mumby (ENG)	2–0	Gwali – Donga (SOL)	Smithfield
31 July 2022; 19:00	(21–10, 21–6); Report			Smithfield

2 August 2022; 15:30	Pata – Toko (VAN)	2–0	Gwali – Donga (SOL)	Smithfield
2 August 2022; 15:30	(21–8, 21–7); Report			Smithfield

4 August 2022; 14:30	Beattie – Coutts (SCO)	2–0	Gwali – Donga (SOL)	Smithfield
4 August 2022; 14:30	(21–6, 21–16); Report			Smithfield

== Boxing ==
Men

Athlete	Event	Round of 32	Round of 16	Quarterfinals	Semifinals	Final	
Athlete	Event	Opposition Result	Opposition Result	Opposition Result	Opposition Result	Opposition Result	Rank
Pemberton Lele	Welterweight	Bye	Warupi (PNG); L 1 - 4	did not advance			

== Judo ==
Men

Athlete	Event	Round of 16	Quarterfinals	Semifinals	Repechage	Final/BM	
Athlete	Event	Opposition Result	Opposition Result	Opposition Result	Opposition Result	Opposition Result	Rank
Leslie Pandabela	-73 kg	Matos (MOZ); L 00 - 10	did not advance				9

== Swimming ==
Men

Athlete	Event	Heat		Semifinal		Final	
Athlete	Event	Time	Rank	Time	Rank	Time	Rank
Edgar Iro	50 m freestyle	27.42	65	did not advance			
Edgar Iro	50 m butterfly	29.50	51	did not advance			
Matthew Tiako	50 m freestyle	32.29	71	did not advance			

Women

Athlete	Event	Heat		Semifinal		Final	
Athlete	Event	Time	Rank	Time	Rank	Time	Rank
Wendy Charles	50 m freestyle	34.02	68	did not advance			

== Table tennis ==
Singles

Athletes	Event	Group stage				Round of 32	Round of 16	Quarterfinal	Semifinal	Final / BM	
Athletes	Event	Opposition Score	Opposition Score	Opposition Score	Rank	Opposition Score	Opposition Score	Opposition Score	Opposition Score	Opposition Score	Rank
Gary Nuopula	Men's singles	Wu (FIJ); L 0 - 4	Commey (GHA); L 0 - 4	Dalgleish (SCO); L 0 - 4	4	did not advance					
Connie Sifi	Women's singles	Morin (CAN); L 0 - 4	Sultana (BAN); L 0 - 4	—	3	did not advance					
Noela Olo	Women's singles C6–10	Pickard (ENG); L 0 - 3	Williams (WAL); L 0 - 3	Lei (AUS); L 0 - 3	4	—			did not advance		

Doubles

Athletes	Event	Round of 64	Round of 32	Round of 16	Quarterfinal	Semifinal	Final / BM	
Athletes	Event	Opposition Score	Opposition Score	Opposition Score	Opposition Score	Opposition Score	Opposition Score	Rank
Gary Nuopula; Connie Sifi	Mixed doubles	Britton / Edghill (GUY); L 1 - 3	did not advance					

== Triathlon ==
Individual

Athlete	Event	Swim (750 m)	Trans 1	Bike (20 km)	Trans 2	Run (5 km)	Total	Rank
Timson Irowane	Men's	14:21	1:31	37:20	0:23	24:23	1:17:58	44
Andriana Tukuvia	Women's	14:59	1:19	45:34	0:28	29:33	1:31:53	31

== Weightlifting ==
One weightlifter qualified through their position in the IWF Commonwealth Ranking List (as of 9 March 2022).

Athlete	Event	Weight lifted		Total	Rank
Athlete	Event	Snatch	Clean & jerk	Total	Rank
Phillip Masi	Men's -55 kg	90	107	197	6
Jenly Tegu Wini	Women's -55 kg	79	No Mark	did not finish	
