= Weightlifting at the 2022 Commonwealth Games – Men's 55 kg =

Weightlifting – Men's 55 kg at the 2022 Commonwealth Games
- Venue: National Exhibition Centre
- Dates: 30 July
- Competitors: 11 from 11 nations
- Winning total: 249 kg

Medalists
gold medal	Aniq Kasdan	Malaysia
silver medal	Sanket Mahadev Sargar	India
bronze medal	Dilanka Isuru Kumara	Sri Lanka

The Men's 55 kg weightlifting event at the 2022 Commonwealth Games took place at the National Exhibition Centre on 30 July 2022. The weightlifter from Malaysia, Aniq Kasdan won the gold, with a combined lift of 249 kg.

== Records ==
Prior to this competition, the existing world, Commonwealth and Games records were as follows:
When the previous records and weight classes were discarded following readjustment, the IWF defined "world standards" as the minimum lifts needed to qualify as world records (WR), CommonWealth Authority defined "Commonwealth standards" and "Commonwealth games standards" as the minimum lifts needed to qualify as Commonwealth record (CR) and Commonwealth games record (GR) in the new weight classes. Wherever World Standard/Commonwealth Standard/Commonwealth Games Standard appear in the list below, no qualified weightlifter has yet lifted the benchmark weights in a sanctioned competition.

World record	Snatch	World Standard	135 kg		
World record	Clean & Jerk	Om Yun-chol (PRK)	166 kg	Pattaya, Thailand	18 September 2019
World record	Total	Om Yun-chol (PRK)	294 kg	Pattaya, Thailand	18 September 2019
Commonwealth record	Snatch	Commonwealth Standard	114 kg		
Commonwealth record	Clean & Jerk	Sanket Sargar (IND)	143 kg	Singapore	25 February 2022
Commonwealth record	Total	Sanket Sargar (IND)	256 kg	Singapore	25 February 2022
Games record	Snatch	Commonwealth Games Standard	114 kg		
Games record	Clean & Jerk	Commonwealth Games Standard	141 kg		
Games record	Total	Commonwealth Games Standard	255 kg		

The following records were established during the competition:

Clean & Jerk	142 kg	Aniq Kasdan (MAS)	GR

== Schedule ==
All times are British Summer Time (UTC+1)

Date	Time	Round
Saturday 30 July 2022	09:00	Final

== Results ==
Rank	Athlete	Body weight (kg)	Snatch (kg)				Clean & Jerk (kg)				Total
Rank	Athlete	Body weight (kg)	1	2	3	Result	1	2	3	Result	Total
1st place, gold medalist(s)	Aniq Kasdan (MAS)	54.72	107	~~111~~	~~111~~	107	138	~~142~~	142	142 GR	249
2nd place, silver medalist(s)	Sanket Mahadev Sargar (IND)	54.56	107	111	113	113	135	~~139~~	~~139~~	135	248
3rd place, bronze medalist(s)	Dilanka Isuru Kumara (SRI)	54.80	~~105~~	105	~~112~~	105	120	~~137~~	~~141~~	120	225
4	Ben Hickling (ENG)	54.79	~~93~~	93	~~97~~	93	112	116	119	119	212
5	Md Ashikur Rahman Taj (BAN)	54.65	90	93	~~96~~	93	110	~~115~~	118	118	211
6	Philip Masi (SOL)	54.50	82	~~90~~	90	90	102	107	~~110~~	107	197
7	Willem Gwendal Emile (MRI)	53.97	75	80	83	83	95	100	103	103	186
8	David Mok Pingwei (SGP)	54.67	81	~~86~~	~~87~~	81	100	~~103~~	~~103~~	100	181
9	Kgotla Alphius N Kgaswane (BOT)	54.55	70	~~75~~	~~77~~	70	95	~~100~~	101	101	171
10	Benjamin Osiemo Ochoma (KEN)	54.20	65	~~70~~	~~70~~	65	83	85	~~88~~	85	150
―	Davis Niyoyita (UGA)	55.00	~~100~~	~~100~~	~~100~~	―	―	―	―	―	DNF
