= Kerem Özmen =

Turkish boxer

Personal information
- Nationality: Turkey

Boxing career
Medal record
Men's amateur boxing
Representing Turkey
IBA World Championships
Silver medal – second place	2021 Belgrade	Light welterweight

Kerem Özmen is a Turkish boxer. He competed at the 2021 AIBA World Boxing Championships, winning the silver medal in the light welterweight event.
