= Guyanese =

Guyanese may refer to:

- Something of, from, or related to the country of Guyana
- A person from Guyana, or of Guyanese descent. For information about the Guyanese people, see:
  - Guyanese people
  - Demographics of Guyana
  - Culture of Guyana
- Guyanese cuisine
- Guyanese Creole

== See also ==
- Guianese, of from, or related to the country of French Guiana
