= Joe Tyers =

English boxer (born 2000)

Personal information
- Nationality: British (English)
- Born: 15 September 2000 (age 25) Ashington, Northumberland

Sport
- Sport: Boxing
- Event: light welterweight

Joseph Tyers (born 15 September 2000) is an English international boxer. He has represented England at the Commonwealth Games.

== Biography ==
Tyers sparred with fighters Pat McCormack and Luke McCormack at the 2020 Summer Olympics in Tokyo. He trains at GB Boxing's high-performance base in Sheffield. Tyers was the runner-up to Masood Abdulah in the 2019 England Boxing National Amateur Championships when boxing for Darlington BC.

In 2022, he was selected for the 2022 Commonwealth Games in Birmingham where he competed in men's light welterweight division.
