= Jonathan van Lange =

Guyanese cricketer (born 2006)

Personal information
- Full name: Jonathan Brayden van Lange
- Born: 30 December 2006 (age 19); Georgetown, Guyana
- Batting: Right-handed
- Bowling: Right-arm medium
- Role: Allrounder

Domestic team information
- Years: Team
- 2026: Guyana
- 2026: Guyana Amazon Warriors

Career statistics
Competition	FC
Matches	1
Runs scored	60
Batting average	30.00
100s/50s	0/1
Top score	50
Balls bowled	87
Wickets	-
Bowling average	-
5 wickets in innings	-
10 wickets in match	-
Best bowling	-
Catches/stumpings	1/–
- Source: Cricinfo, 21 July 2026

Jonathan Brayden van Lange (born 30 December 2006) is a Guyanese cricketer who has played for the Guyana national cricket team in West Indian domestic cricket. He was also part of the West Indies squad that participated in the 2026 Under-19 Men's Cricket World Cup.

== Background ==
He made his debut for Guyana during the final of the 2026 West Indies Championship, against Trinidad and Tobago.

In the players' draft for the 2026 CPL which was held in May 2026, he was selected by the Guyana Amazon Warriors. In June 2026, he was also selected to play for the Amazon Warriors for the third season of the Global Super League as a replacement player for Amir Jangoo.
