= Taiga Imanaga =

Japanese boxer (born 1999)

Personal information
- Nationality: Japanese
- Born: 今永虎雅; 9 August 1999 (age 27) Kawachinagano, Osaka, Japan
- Height: 5 ft 9 in (177 cm)
- Weight: Lightweight

Boxing career
- Reach: 71 in (180 cm)
- Stance: Southpaw

Boxing record
- Total fights: 12
- Wins: 11
- Win by KO: 5
- Losses: 1

Taiga Imanaga (born 9 August 1999) is a Japanese professional boxer who currently competes in the lightweight division.

== Amateur career ==
Imanaga had a record eight major amateur titles at a high school in Nara Prefecture. His overall amateur record is 113 wins which includes 23 RSCs and 13 losses

== Professional career ==
Imanaga made his debut against Takahiro Hamazaki at the Korakuen Hall. Imanaga dropped Hamazaki twice in the second round forcing his corner to throw in the towel. After winning five of his first six fights by stoppage Imanaga was forced to go the distance against Yoji Saito in the final of an Asian lightweight tournament. Imanaga dropped Saito in the third round and won by unanimous decision. In his eighth professional fight Imanaga also went the distance against Romer Pinili of the Philippines. The fight however was very one sided and Imanaga scored a knockdown in the fifth round.

== Professional boxing record ==
12 fights	11 wins	1 loss
By knockout	5	0
By decision	6	1

No.	Result	Record	Opponent	Type	Round, time	Date	Location	Notes
12	Win	11–1	(South Korea) Min Ho Jung	UD	10	8 Sep 2026	Korakuen Hall, Tokyo, Japan	Retained OPBF lightweight title
11	Win	10–1	(Japan) Shuma Nakazato	MD	10	7 Jun 2026	Sumiyoshi Ward Center, Osaka, Japan	Won OPBF lightweight title
10	Loss	9–1	(Dominican Republic) Eridson Garcia	SD	10	27 Dec 2025	Mohammed Abdo Arena, Riyadh, Saudi Arabia	
9	Win	9–0	(Japan) Yudai Murakami	UD	10	14 Sep 2025	IG Arena, Nagoya, Japan	Won vacant Japanese lightweight title
8	Win	8–0	(Philippines) Romer Pinili	UD	8	25 Mar 2025	Korakuen Hall, Tokyo, Japan	
7	Win	7–0	(Japan) Yoji Saito	UD	8	21 Nov 2024	Korakuen Hall, Tokyo, Japan	
6	Win	6–0	(Philippines) Marvin Esquierdo	KO	2 (8), 0:48	18 Jul 2024	Korakuen Hall, Tokyo, Japan	
5	Win	5–0	(China) Qiang Ma	TKO	1 (8), 2:35	25 Apr 2024	Korakuen Hall, Tokyo, Japan	
4	Win	4–0	(Indonesia) Hebi Marapu	SD	8	25 Jul 2023	Ariake Arena, Koto-Ku,, Tokyo, Japan	
3	Win	3–0	(Philippines) Roy Sumugat	KO	6 (8), 1:25	26 Dec 2022	Korakuen Hall, Tokyo, Japan	
2	Win	2–0	(Philippines) John Lawrence Ordonio	KO	4 (6), 1:03	26 Aug 2022	Korakuen Hall, Tokyo, Japan	
1	Win	1–0	(Japan) Takahiro Hamazaki	KO	2 (6) 2:49	29 Jun 2022	Korakuen Hall, Tokyo, Japan	
