= Sura Krishna Chakma =

Bangladeshi professional boxer

Personal information
- Native name: 𑄥𑄪𑄢𑄮 𑄇𑄳𑄢𑄨𑄥𑄴𑄚𑄧 𑄌𑄇𑄴𑄟
- Nickname: Jummo Rock
- Nationality: Bangladeshi
- Born: 12 February 1995 (age 31) Jurasuri, Rangamati district, Chattogram
- Height: 5 ft 6 in (168 cm)

Boxing career

Boxing record
- Total fights: 8
- Wins: 8
- Win by KO: 4
Medal record
Men's amateur boxing
Representing Bangladesh
South Asian Games
Bronze medal – third place	2019 Nepal	Lightweight

Sura Krishna Chakma (সুরকৃষ্ণ চাকমা) is a Bangladeshi professional boxer from Rangamati district. He is Bangladesh's first ever professional boxer.

== Career ==
Sura started boxing in 2007. He became Bangladesh games champion in 2013. In 2014, he became national champion of Bangladesh. Then he participated in the Glasgow Commonwealth Games in 2014. In 2015, he took higher boxing training at London about 6 month with sponsorship by Ali Jacko and matchroom sports. He became the first professional boxer of Bangladesh. He got a rio olympic scholarship award in 2016. In 2018, he fought 2 professional bout in India and won both fight by ko. Then in 2019, he participated in South Asian Games, held in Nepal. He got a bronze medal for Bangladesh. In 2020/21, he became Bangladesh's champion again and became first International pro boxing champion. He participated in the 2022 Commonwealth Games but could not fight because of health issues.
