= Charlotte Bardsley =

English table tennis player (born 2002)

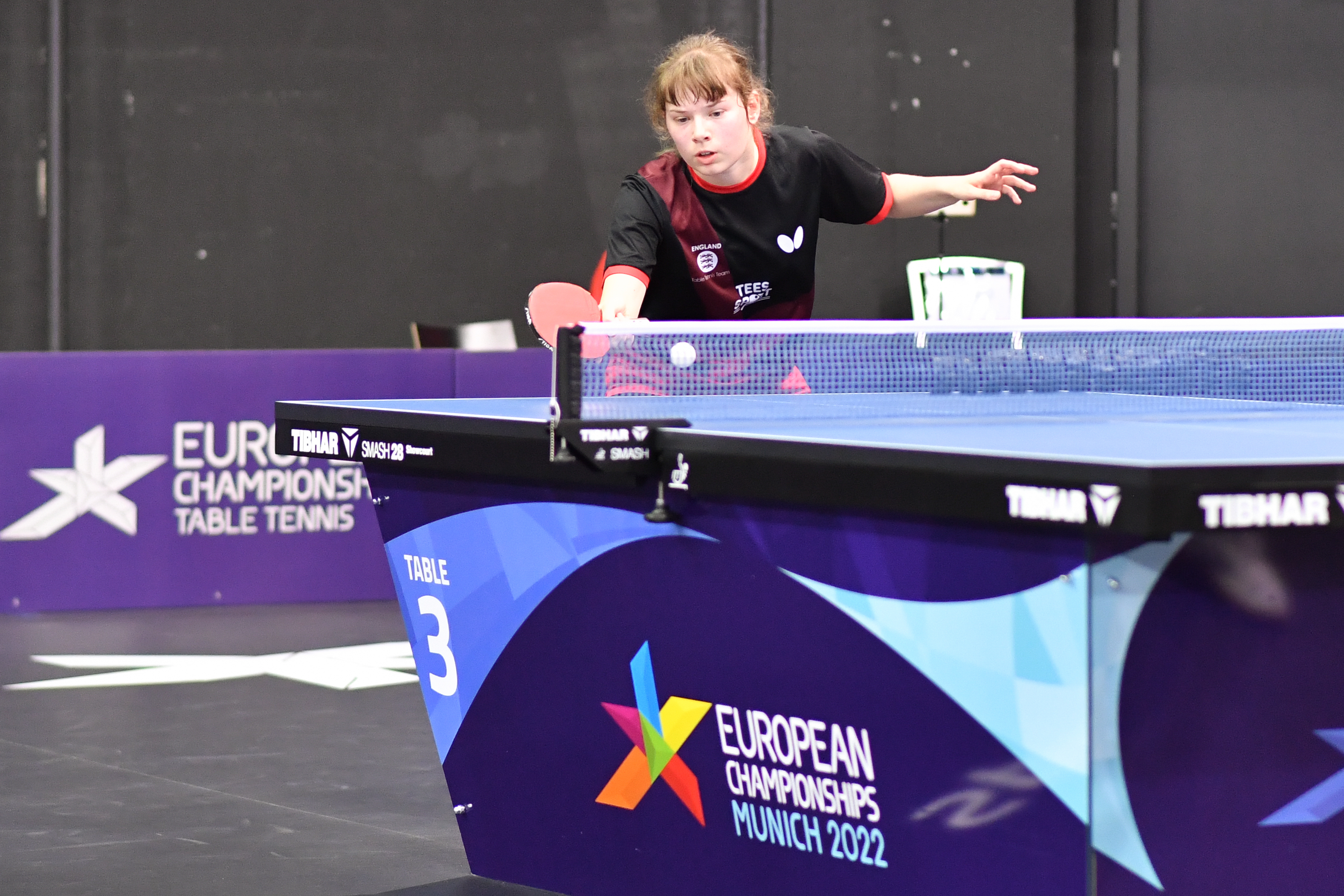

Personal information
- Nationality: British (English)
- Born: 8 March 2002 (age 24) Kobe, Japan

Sport
- Sport: Table tennis
- Club: SV Böblingen (Germany)

Charlotte Bardsley (born 8 March 2002) is an English international table tennis player. Though born in Kobe (Japan), she lives in the West Midlands of the UK. She is a junior national champion and has represented England at the Commonwealth Games.

== Biography ==
Bardsley joined the senior World Cup and European Championship squads and competed at the ITTF Team World Cup. She became the national junior champion in the women's singles at the 2021 English National Table Tennis Championships, and the U21 champion at the 2022 English National Table Tennis Championships.

In 2022, she was selected for the 2022 Commonwealth Games in Birmingham where she competed in four events; the women's singles, the women's doubles, the mixed doubles and the women's team events.
