= Sophie Earley =

Northern Irish table tennis player

Personal information
- Nationality: Northern Ireland
- Born: 13 May 2006 (age 20)
- Height: 1.65 m (5 ft 5 in)
- Weight: 55 kg (121 lb)

Sport
- Sport: Table tennis
- Playing style: Shakehand

Sophie Earley (born 13 May 2006) is a Northern Irish table tennis player who represents England. As of November 2021, she ranked twelfth in the world Under-15 division. She participated at the 2022 Commonwealth Games in the Women's singles and Mixed doubles. In singles, Earley reached the round of 16 before being knocked out and in the Mixed doubles she reached the round of 32 alongside Owen Cathcart before being knocked out.

== Biography ==
Sophie Earley is from Carryduff, Northern Ireland and was born on 13 May 2006. She attended secondary school at Malone College, Belfast. As of 2022, she was studying A-level biology and psychology online and living in Nottingham, England.

In October 2018, Earley became the first 12-year-old to win an adult ranking event in Ireland. She was part of the Ormeau Table Tennis Club before joining the a club in Nîmes, France. BBC Sport called Earley "one of the brighest table tennis prospects in the British Isles". Earley won bronze at the 2021 European Youth Championships in the Under 15s division in both singles and doubles (with Silvia Coll of Spain). This made her the first Irish player to achieve a medal at the tournament. She won the silver medal the ITTF Youth contender competition. Earley received £2,000 in funding from Bluewater Financial Planning bursary associated with the Mary Peters Trust. As of November 2021, she ranked twelfth in the world Under-15 division.

Earley participated at the 2022 Commonwealth Games in the Women's singles and Mixed doubles. In singles, in the preliminary stage she beat both Priscilla Greaves of Guyana and Christy Bristol of Seychelles 4–0. In the round of 32, she beat Zhou Jingyi of Singapore 4–3 before losing to Canada's Zhang Mo 3–4 in the round of 16. In the Mixed doubles, she played alongside Owen Cathcart and first won against Seychelles's Godfrey Sultan and Bristol 3–0 in the round of 64. In the round of 32, they lost to 0—3 India's Sharath Kamal and Sreeja Akula who ended up winning gold.

In January 2023, Earley and her family moved from Northern Ireland to England and in June she switched international teams from Ireland to England after it was confirmed by the ITTF. She is eligible to represent Team GB immediately but has to wait until 2028 to represent England at the World and European Championships (Team and Individual).

In September 2024, Earley won the women's title at the first Under-21 National Cup at the BATTS club in Harlow.
