= Sreeja Akula =

Indian table-tennis player

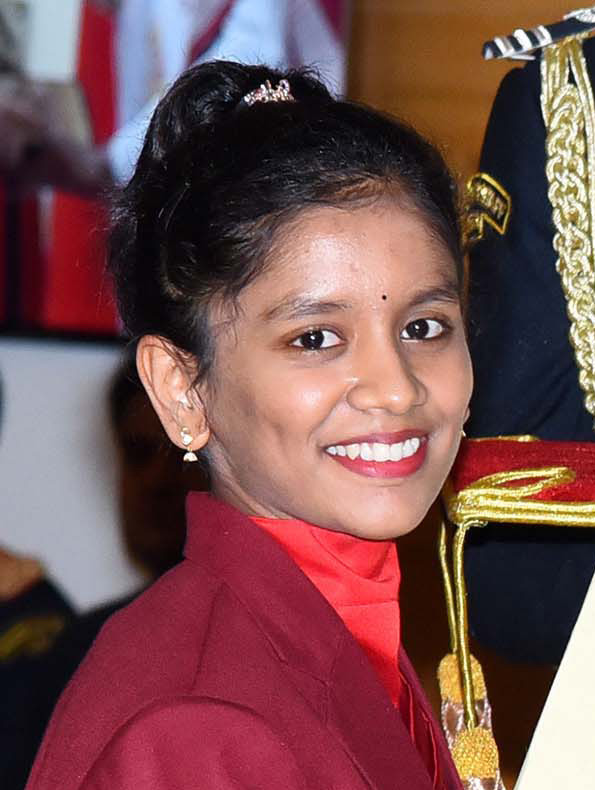
- Akula in 2022

Personal information
- Nationality: Indian
- Born: 31 July 1998 (age 28) Hyderabad, India

Sport
- Sport: Table tennis
- Playing style: Right-handed, shakehand grip
- Highest ranking: 22 (06 August 2024)
- Current ranking: 58 (28 September 2026)
Medal record
Women's table tennis
Representing India
Commonwealth Games
Gold medal – first place	2022 Birmingham	Mixed doubles
Asian Championships
Bronze medal – third place	2024 Astana	Women's team
South Asian Games
Gold medal – first place	2019 Kathmandu–Pokhara	Women's doubles
Gold medal – first place	2019 Kathmandu–Pokhara	Women's team

Sreeja Akula (born 31 July 1998) is an Indian table tennis player. She is a two-time Indian national champion. She is currently ranked India number one in women's singles. Akula received the Arjuna Award in 2022.

At the 2022 Commonwealth Games, Akula won the gold medal in the mixed doubles event with Sharath Kamal. In June 2024, she became the first Indian to win a singles title at the WTT Contender level by clinching the top spot at WTT Contender Lagos.

She also became the second ever Indian paddler to reach the Pre-Quarterfinals in the Olympics at the Paris Olympics 2024.

== Early life and education ==
She studied in Rosary Convent High School,Abids. Sreeja hails from Hyderabad. Both her father Praveen Kumar, a manager in a private insurance company, and elder sister Ravali are table tennis players. Ravali played at the university level. Sreeja trained under coach Somnath Ghosh, at his academy at Kukatpally, Hyderabad. Before that she learnt the basics at St Paul's Academy in Basheer Bagh when she was nine years and continued the game at YMCA in Narayanguda, She passed her intermediate (plus two) with 98.7 percent and then graduated in commerce. Telangana State Table Tennis Association (TSTTA) Secretary Nagendra Reddy was one of her first coaches.

== Career ==
Akula was the gold medalist in Women's Doubles and Women's Team events in Table tennis at the 2019 South Asian Games.

Akula won the women's singles and doubles table tennis titles at the 83rd Senior National and Inter-State Table Tennis Championships held in April 2022. She was the runner-up in national Women's singles in the previous edition, losing to Manika Batra. She was also a part of the Indian team at the 2022 Commonwealth Games where she won gold medal in mixed doubles event with Sharath Kamal.

In January 2024, Sreeja won her maiden WTT singles career title at the WTT Feeder Corpus Christi in Texas. This was followed by her second singles career title at the WTT Feeder Beirut II in March 2024 where she beat Luxembourg's Sarah De Nutte 3-1 (6–11, 12–10, 11–5, 11–9) in the final. Sreeja defeated WR2 Chinese paddler Wang Yidi in a group match at 2024 World Team Championships, although her team narrowly lost the tie as 2–3. At the WTT Contender Lagos in June 2024, Akula became the first Indian to win a title at the Contender level. She achieved this feat by beating China's Ding Yijie with a 4–1 score in the ultimate clash. At the same event, she also won the women's doubles title alongside Archana Kamath.

== Singles Titles ==
Year	Tournament	Final opponent	Score
2024	WTT Contender Lagos	(China) Ding Yijie	4–1
2024	WTT Feeder Corpus Christi	(United States) Lily Zhang	3–0
2024	WTT Feeder Beirut II	(Luxembourg) Sarah De Nutte	3–1

== Awards ==
Akula received the Arjuna Award in 2022.
