= 2022 Commonwealth Games medal table =

Ranking of participants by medal total

The 2022 Commonwealth Games (officially known as the XXII Commonwealth Games) was a multi-sport event held in Birmingham, England, from 28 July to 8 August 2022. It was the first time that Birmingham hosted the games and also marked England's third time hosting the Commonwealth Games after London 1934 and Manchester 2002, and the seventh Games in the United Kingdom after London and Manchester, Cardiff 1958, Edinburgh 1970 and 1986, and Glasgow 2014.

== Rules ==
The ranking in this table is consistent with International Olympic Committee convention in its published medal tables. By default, the table is ordered by the number of gold medals the athletes from a nation have won (in this context, a "nation" is an entity represented by a Commonwealth Games Association). The number of silver medals is taken into consideration next and then the number of bronze medals. If nations are still tied, equal ranking is given and they are listed alphabetically by their three-letter country code. The following award rule is enforced by the Commonwealth Games Federation (CGF).

The current rules approved in 2015, to have an event to be contested at the Commonwealth Games, there must be at least 3 athletes from two national associations competing. Thus, only the gold medal will be awarded to the first place. This rule expands to the case where only 4 athletes from at least 2 associations are registered. However, only the gold and silver medals will be given to the first and second place respectively. The bronze medal will be given when there are 5 athletes or teams registered in the event. In the case of those sports that are given two bronze medals, the minimum is 7 athletes from 3 countries. These rules do not apply for team sports in which at least 4 teams have to be entered.

Two bronze medals was awarded in boxing, judo and in 10 of 12 wrestling events.

No bronze medal was awarded in either the Women's Marathon T54 event, the Women's Tandem B Cycling and in the women's 53 kg freestyle wrestling event as there were only four entries in each event. As per current Commonwealth Games regulations, a bronze medal is not available if there are fewer than five entries from three countries. Only one bronze was awarded in the women's 50 kg freestyle wrestling event as there was only six entries.

Additionally, two silver medals were awarded in the Women's 50m butterfly and Men's 100m butterfly swimming events, as a result of a tie between two athletes in each respective event.

== Medals ==
On 4 May 2022 in a special ceremony that took place in the Boardroom of the Curzon Building, Birmingham 2022 organiser unveiled the official medals designed by three students from Birmingham’s School of Jewellery – Amber Alys, Francesca Wilcox (for ribbon) and the portuguese Catarina Rodrigues Caeiro (for medal case). The medal design took 15 months to complete and features embossed areas and features the Games edition and the Commonwealth Sport emblem on opposite sides. It was made to be textured and has tactile quality, so that all athletes including those with a visual impairment will be able to enjoy the design.

A total of 1,875 medals were manufactured by Toye, Kenning and Spencer Company in Birmingham’s Jewellery Quarter, located near Arena Birmingham and on the marathon route. The medals are 63 millimetres in diameter and 74.3 millimetres in length, with the Gold and silver medals weigh approximately 150 grams and the bronze 130 grams. Each medal also featured an adjustable ribbon to accommodate athletes of all sizes.

== Accomplishments ==
The Gambia got its first silver medal in the history of the Commonwealth Games, when the judoka Faye Njie won the silver medal in the men's 73 kg judo event, the country had won a single bronze medal previously at the 1970 Commonwealth Games.

Niue won its first medal ever when the boxer Duken Tutakitoa-Williams won one of the two bronze medals in the men's heavyweight boxing.

== Medal table ==
* Host nation (England)

2022 Commonwealth Games
Rank	CGA	Gold	Silver	Bronze	Total
1	Australia	67	57	56	180
2	England*	58	65	53	176
3	Canada	26	32	34	92
4	India	21	16	23	60
5	New Zealand	20	12	18	50
6	Scotland	13	12	26	51
7	Nigeria	12	8	14	34
8	Wales	8	6	14	28
9	South Africa	7	9	11	27
10	Malaysia	7	8	8	23
11	Northern Ireland	7	7	4	18
12	Jamaica	6	7	2	15
13	Kenya	6	5	10	21
14	Singapore	4	4	4	12
15	Trinidad and Tobago	3	2	1	6
16	Uganda	3	0	2	5
17	Cyprus	2	3	6	11
18	Pakistan	2	3	2	7
19	Samoa	1	4	0	5
20	Barbados	1	1	1	3
20	Cameroon	1	1	1	3
20	Zambia	1	1	1	3
23	Bahamas	1	1	0	2
23	Grenada	1	1	0	2
25	Bermuda	1	0	1	2
26	British Virgin Islands	1	0	0	1
27	Mauritius	0	3	2	5
28	Ghana	0	2	3	5
29	Fiji	0	2	2	4
30	Mozambique	0	2	1	3
31	Sri Lanka	0	1	3	4
32	Tanzania	0	1	2	3
33	Botswana	0	1	1	2
33	Guernsey	0	1	1	2
35	Dominica	0	1	0	1
35	Papua New Guinea	0	1	0	1
35	Saint Lucia	0	1	0	1
35	The Gambia	0	1	0	1
39	Namibia	0	0	4	4
40	Malta	0	0	1	1
40	Nauru	0	0	1	1
40	Niue	0	0	1	1
40	Vanuatu	0	0	1	1
Totals (43 entries)		280	282	315	877

On 14 July 2023, the Nigerian team was disqualified as winners of the women's 4x100 metre relay in athletics as Nzubechi Grace Nwokocha was found in violation of anti-doping measures. This promoted England to gold, Jamaica to silver, and Australia were awarded the bronze medal. Similarly, in the men's heavyweight category in the para powerlifting, gold medal winner Sudhir was later disqualified for doping violations, and stripped off his medal. Hence, Nigeria's Ikechukwu Obichukwu was upgraded to gold, Scotland's Micky Yule to silver, and Australia's Ben Wright was awarded the bronze medal.

== See also ==
- All-time Commonwealth Games medal table
