= Para powerlifting at the 2018 Commonwealth Games – Men's heavyweight =

Para powerlifting – Men's heavyweight at the 2018 Commonwealth Games
- Venue: Carrara Sports and Leisure Centre
- Dates: 10 April
- Competitors: 10 from 9 nations
- Winning points: 191.9

Medalists
gold medal	Abdulazeez Ibrahim	Nigeria
silver medal	Jong Yee Khie	Malaysia
bronze medal	Sachin Chaudhary	India

The Men's Heavyweight powerlifting event at the 2018 Commonwealth Games in Gold Coast, Australia, took place at Carrara Sports and Leisure Centre on 10 April 2018.

== Result ==
Rank	Athlete	Body weight	Attempt 1	Attempt 2	Attempt 3	Points
1st place, gold medalist(s)	Abdulazeez Ibrahim (NGR)	93.10	210	220	~~221~~	191.9
2nd place, silver medalist(s)	Jong Yee Khie (MAS)	96.80	205	213	220	188.7
3rd place, bronze medalist(s)	Sachin Chaudhary (IND)	86.50	~~201~~	~~201~~	201	181.0
4	Michael Yule (SCO)	72.10	~~170~~	172	174	169.9
5	Nathaniel Wilding (ENG)	72.20	168	171	173	152.4
6	Ben Wright (AUS)	89.80	163	168	172	152.4
7	Ricardo Fitzpatrick (RSA)	84.30	~~160~~	160	167	152.1
8	Leigh Skinner (AUS)	83.30	157	~~164~~	~~164~~	143.7
9	Kalai Vanen (SGP)	94.60	~~150~~	150	156	135.1
	Sean Gaffney (WAL)	102.50	~~120~~	~~120~~	~~120~~	–
