= Powerlifting at the 2010 Commonwealth Games – Men's Open bench press =

The Men's Open bench press weightlifting event was an event at the weightlifting competition The whole competition took place on 12 October at 16:50. The weightlifter from Nigeria won the gold.

== Results ==
Rank	Name	Country	Group	B.weight (kg)	1	2	3	Total (kg)
1st place, gold medalist(s)	Yakubu Adesokan	Nigeria	A	44.82	162.5	172.5	175.0	215.1
2nd place, silver medalist(s)	Anthony Ulonnam	Nigeria	A	52.20	170.0	180.0	185.0	210.6
3rd place, bronze medalist(s)	Ikechukwu Obichukwu	Nigeria	A	47.92	155.0	165.0	~~172.5~~	196
4	Rajinder Singh Rahelu	India	A	66.47	187.5	~~192.5~~	~~195.0~~	190.2
5	Ali Jawad	England	A	57.25	~~167.5~~	167.5	~~175.0~~	182.3
6	Abebe Fekadu	Australia	A	55.50	155.0	160.0	162.5	179.5
7	Samson Okutto	Kenya	A	57.53	~~160.0~~	160.0	165.0	179.2
8	Sachin Chaudhary	India	A	82.45	~~190.0~~	190.0	~~200.0~~	174.8
9	Mariappan Perumal	Malaysia	B	73.92	170.0	175.0	177.5	171.4
10	Ruben Soroseb	Namibia	B	92.87	180.0	185.0	190.0	165.9
11	Evgeni Popov	South Africa	B	71.29	165.0	~~175.0~~	~~180.0~~	162.1
12	Leigh Skinner	Australia	B	80.65	~~165.0~~	165.0	170.0	157.9
13	Mohd Saad	Malaysia	B	88.16	165.0	~~172.5~~	~~172.5~~	154.1
14	Timothy Harabe	Papua New Guinea	B	73.90	~~147.5~~	147.5	155.0	149.7
15	Chris Rattenbury	England	B	88.29	165.0	~~170.0~~	170.0	147.3
16	Cameron Whittington	Australia	B	102.27	170.0	175.0	~~177.5~~	146.7
17	Nasir Butt	Pakistan	C	69.10	130.0	~~140.0~~	145.0	144.4
18	Johannes Matthysen	South Africa	C	64.70	135.0	~~140.0~~	~~140.0~~	138.6
19	Ziggy Satkurin	Papua New Guinea	C	50.70	105.0	115.0	~~120.0~~	132.8
20	Pope Gazave	Papua New Guinea	C	41.29	97.5	~~105.0~~	~~105.0~~	125.1
21	Seif Chembela	Tanzania	B	65.81	110.0	115.0	120.0	122.2
22	Daniel Steward	Wales	B	63.14	95.0	102.5	~~107.5~~	146.7
23	Kyron Duke	Wales	C	51.92	77.5	82.5	87.5	99.9
24	Alfred Sowah	Ghana	C	48.88	70.0	72.5	75.0	88.2
–	Sandun Wasana Perera	Sri Lanka	B	49.00	–	–	–	–
–	Farman Basha	India	A	45.11	–	–	–	–

== See also ==
- 2010 Commonwealth Games
- Weightlifting at the 2010 Commonwealth Games
