= Commonwealth Esports Championships =

Gaming competition in the Commonwealth of Nations

The Commonwealth Esports Championship was an international esports competition for gamers from member states of the Commonwealth of Nations which was held concurrently with the quadrennial Commonwealth Games.

== History ==
In February 2022, the Commonwealth Games Federation announced that the inaugural Commonwealth Esports Championship would be held concurrently with the 2022 Commonwealth Games in Birmingham, England. The championships would have their own distinct branding, medals, and organisation and that men and women's Dota 2, eFootball, and Rocket League events would take place.

After the successful pilot in 2022 it was then dropped for the scaled-down 2026 Commonwealth Games for unknown reasons, potentially due to it being a smaller games or other internal reasons.

== Editions ==
Number	Year	Host	Games	Nations
1	2022	Birmingham, England	3	12

== All-time medals table ==
As of 2022:

Rank	Nation	Gold	Silver	Bronze	Total
1	Malaysia (MAS)	3	0	0	3
2	England (ENG)	1	3	1	5
3	Wales (WAL)	1	1	1	3
4	Northern Ireland (NIR)	1	0	0	1
5	Scotland (SCO)	0	2	0	2
6	Australia (AUS)	0	0	2	2
7	India (IND)	0	0	1	1
7	Singapore (SIN)	0	0	1	1
Totals (8 entries)		6	6	6	18

== See also ==
- List of esports leagues and tournaments
- British Esports
