= 2022 Commonwealth Games =

Multi-sport event in Birmingham, England

XXII Commonwealth Games
- Host city: Birmingham, England
- Motto: Games for Everyone
- Nations: 72 Commonwealth teams
- Athletes: 4,822
- Events: 283 in 20 sports
- Opening: 28 July 2022
- Closing: 8 August 2022
- Opened by: Charles, Prince of Wales
- Closed by: Prince Edward, Earl of Wessex and Forfar
- Athlete's Oath: Geva Mentor
- Queen's Baton Final Runner: Denise Lewis
- Anthem: Champion, UB40 featuring Dapz on the Map and Gilly G
- Main venue: Alexander Stadium
- Website: www.birmingham2022.com

The 2022 Commonwealth Games, officially known as the XXII Commonwealth Games and commonly known as Birmingham 2022, were an international multi-sport event for members of the Commonwealth of Nations that took place in Birmingham, England between 28 July and 8 August 2022. They were the 22nd edition of the Commonwealth Games. It was the third and seventh time England and the United Kingdom hosted the Commonwealth Games, respectively.

4,822 athletes, including 311 para athletes from 72 Commonwealth Games Associations took part in the event. The event took place at 15 venues across Birmingham, West Midlands and London and featured 19 Commonwealth sports. It was also the first major multi-sport event to have more events for women than men and had the largest integrated parasports programme in the history of the Commonwealth Games with eight parasports.

Australia topped the medal table by both total golds (67) and total medals (179), with host nation England finishing second with 58 golds and 176 total medals and Canada finishing third with 26 golds and 92 total medals. India finished fourth with 22 gold and 61 total medals, and New Zealand finished fifth with 20 gold and 49 total medals. Niue won its first ever Commonwealth Games medal.

Birmingham was announced as the host city on 21 December 2017. The event marked the last time that the Commonwealth Games were held under Queen Elizabeth II prior to her death one month after the conclusion of the Games. The event contributed £1.2 billion to the economy of the United Kingdom.

== Host selection ==
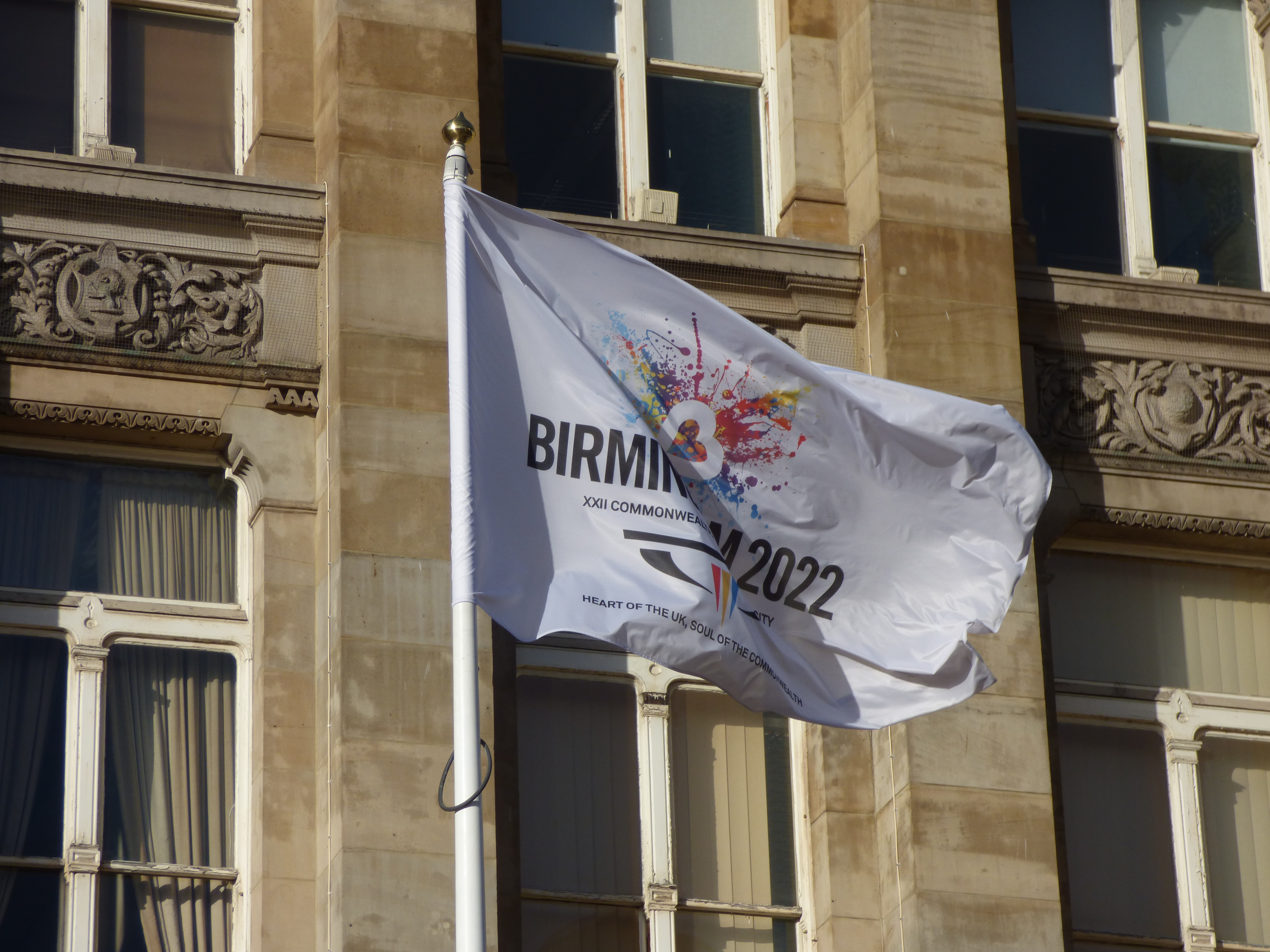
Birmingham 2022 flag (with bidding logo) in Victoria Square, Birmingham, January 2018

Two cities initially launched bids for the games: Durban, South Africa, and Edmonton, Canada. Edmonton withdrew its bid in February 2015, leaving Durban as the only bid to go forward to CGF General Assembly in September 2015. Durban initially secured the right to host the games, as they were the sole bidder for the event. The city previously considered bidding for the 2020 or 2024 Summer Olympics, but later dropped the idea as it wanted to focus on the 2022 Commonwealth Games. It would have marked the first time the games were held in Africa and the second time a Commonwealth republic would have hosted, following Delhi, India, in 2010. The games were set to open on 18 July 2022, coinciding with the birthday of the late South African president, Nelson Mandela. It was reported in February 2017 that Durban might be unable to host the games due to financial constraints. This was confirmed one month later on 13 March 2017 when the CGF stripped Durban of their rights to host the Games.

The bidding process for the 2022 Commonwealth Games was relaunched in March 2017 where English cities Birmingham and Liverpool expressed their interests in hosting the Games. On 14 March 2017, Manchester also expressed an interest in hosting the Games.

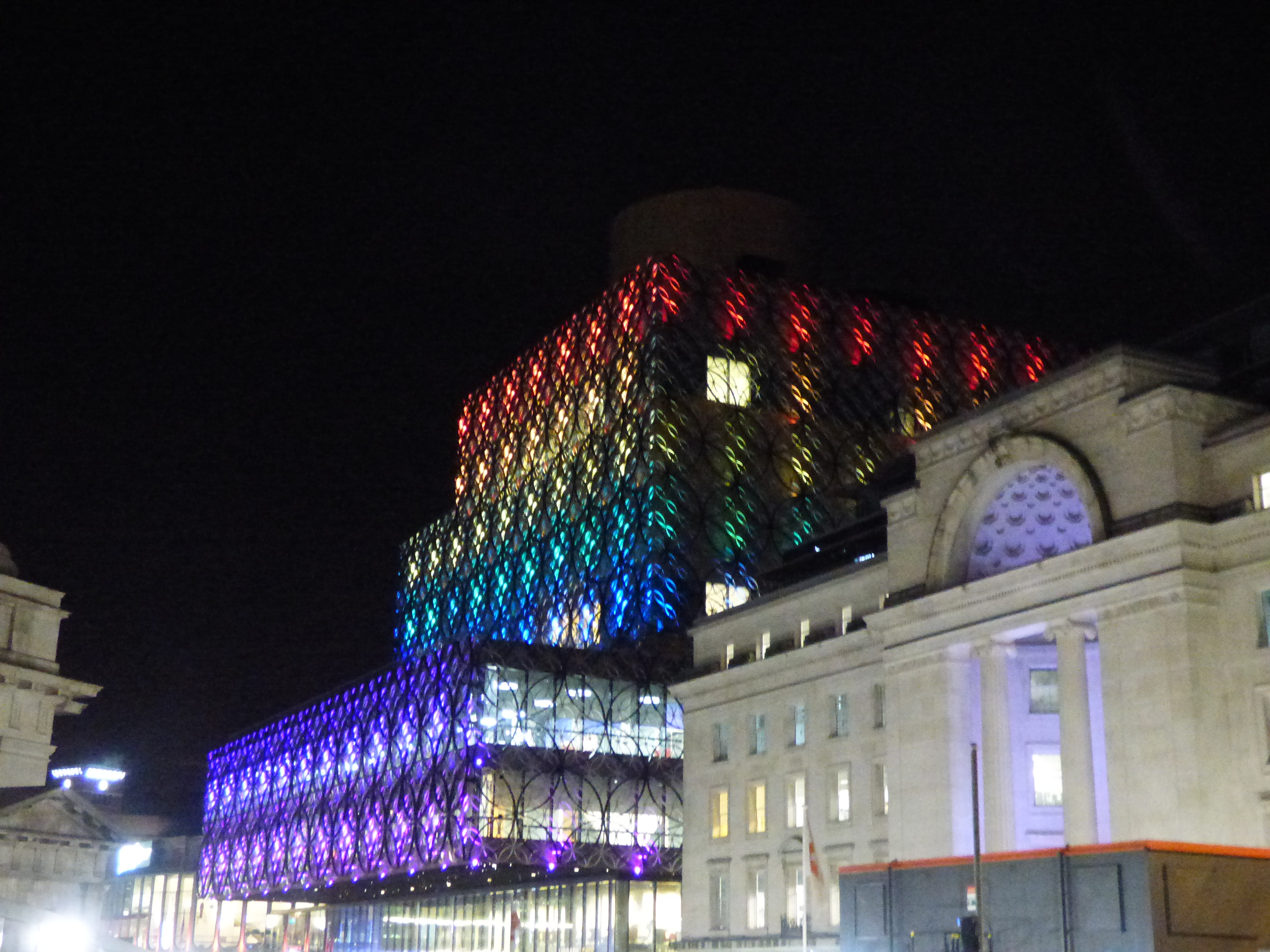
The Library of Birmingham was lit in different colours to celebrate the city being awarded the 2022 Commonwealth Games.

By April 2017, the British Government asked city councils to submit proposals for hosting the 2022 Games. Only Birmingham and Liverpool submitted official applications to the Department for Digital, Culture, Media and Sport. London declined to bid, as it was focusing its efforts on preparing for the World Athletics and Para Athletics Championships. On 27 April 2017, Manchester City Council announced that Manchester would not bid for the Games but could co-host the Games with other English cities. In early September 2017, Birmingham was selected over Liverpool for the recommended bid for England.

The CGF announced that the deadline for the submission of bids was 30 September 2017 and its executive board was expected to announce the host by the end of 2017. Commonwealth Games England submitted the Birmingham bid before the deadline to the CGF to host the 2022 Games. However, it was announced that the bid was not fully compliant, and the bidding process was extended until 30 November 2017. The CGF had 170 questions regarding Birmingham's bid. On 21 December 2017, Birmingham was awarded for the 2022 Games as Durban's replacement host. Louise Martin, president of the CGF, made the official announcement at a press conference at the Arena Academy in Birmingham.

2022 Commonwealth Games bidding results
City	Nation	Votes
Birmingham	England	Unanimous (2017)
Durban	South Africa	Sole Bidder (2015); Withdrew (2017)

== Development and preparation ==
The Birmingham Organising Committee for the 2022 Commonwealth Games (BOCCG) was responsible for the planning and operational delivery of the Games. This includes sport, venue and competition management, ticket sales, all ceremonies and the Queen's Baton Relay. The headquarters of the organising committee is located in One Brindleyplace building and has taken up the office until December 2022.

In March 2018, the BOCCG paid £25 million ($35 million) fee to the CGF for the right to host the 2022 Commonwealth Games. The fee included the £20 million ($28 million) for the Games hosting charges and £5 million ($7 million) for the development work in the Commonwealth.

Birmingham Commonwealth Games Act 2020
- Act of Parliament
- Parliament of the United Kingdom
- Long title: An Act to make provision about the Commonwealth Games that are to be held principally in Birmingham in 2022; and for connected purposes.
- Citation: 2020 c. 10
- Territorial extent: England and Wales; Scotland; Northern Ireland

Dates
- Royal assent: 25 June 2020

Status: Current legislation

History of passage through Parliament

Text of statute as originally enacted

Text of the Birmingham Commonwealth Games Act 2020 as in force today (including any amendments) within the United Kingdom, from legislation.gov.uk.

In July 2018, British Prime Minister Theresa May appointed John Crabtree as Chair of the BOCCG. In January 2019, Ian Reid was announced as chief executive officer of the BOCCG. On 6 June 2019, the British Government introduced the Commonwealth Games Bill which ensured the prohibition of unauthorised sales of Games tickets, effective flow of transport around Games venues, complete protection of commercial rights, and compliance with financial propriety rules by the government's funding of the BOCCG. The bill received royal assent and was passed into law as the Birmingham Commonwealth Games Act 2020 on 25 June 2020.

In June 2020, it was announced that the entire schedule of the Games would be offset by one day to reduce conflicts with sporting events rescheduled due to the COVID-19 pandemic, particularly the UEFA Euro 2020 (held from 11 June to 11 July 2021), the 2020 Summer Olympics (held from 23 July to 8 August 2021), the UEFA Women's Euro 2022 (held from 6 to 31 July in England; the opening ceremony time would have conflicted with one of the semifinal matches), and the final days of the 2022 World Athletics Championships (held from 15 to 24 July). All athletes and officials were required to test negative for COVID-19 on a PCR test before departure and upon arrival; infections during the Games would be handled on a case-by-case basis, with athletes not necessarily required to withdraw or publicly disclose their infection. Commonwealth Games Australia considered the protocols to be less stringent and more "relaxed" than expected, and stated that it planned to impose stricter biosecurity protocols on its athletes to ensure their safety.

=== Venues ===
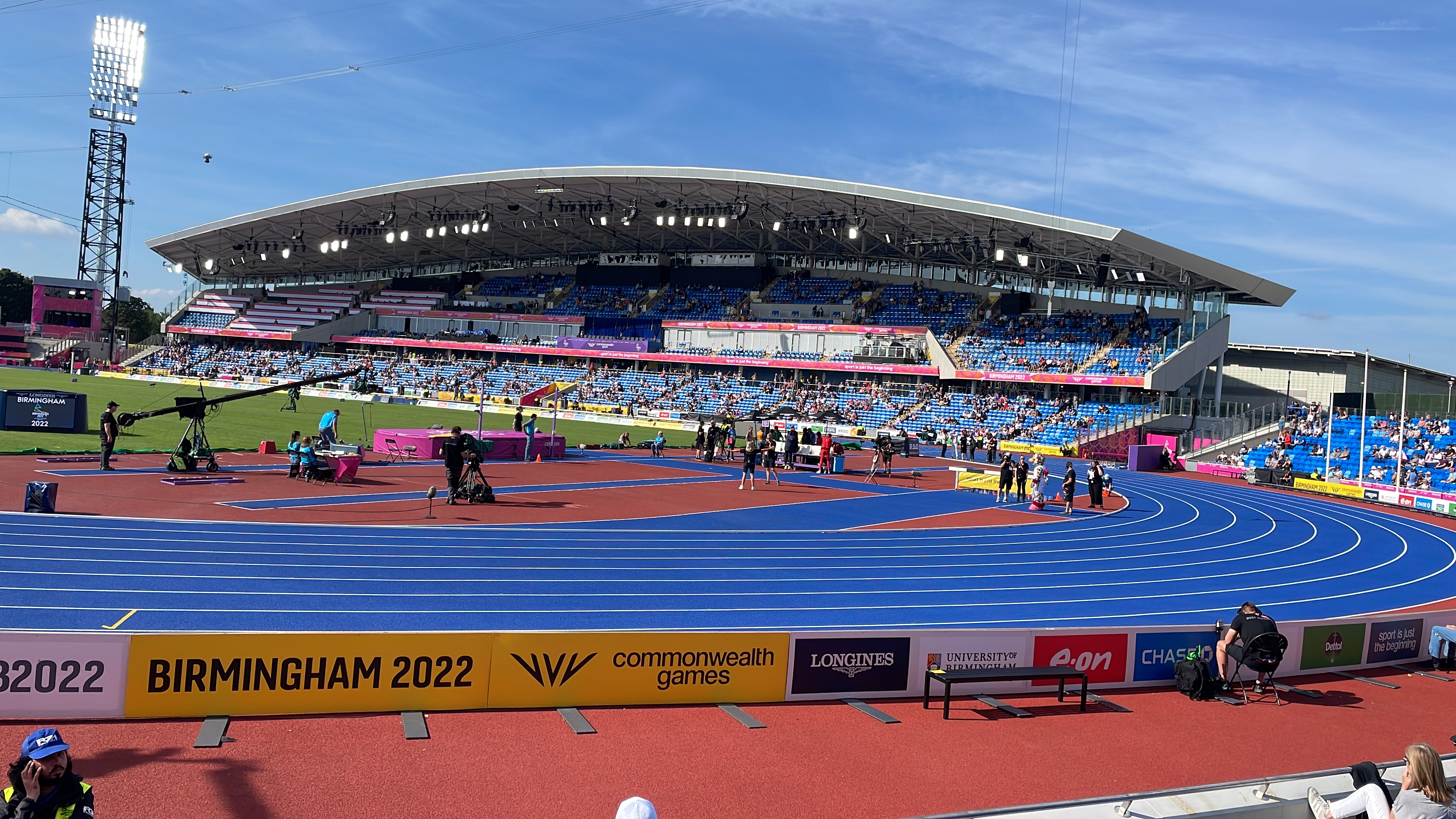
Alexander Stadium during Birmingham 2022

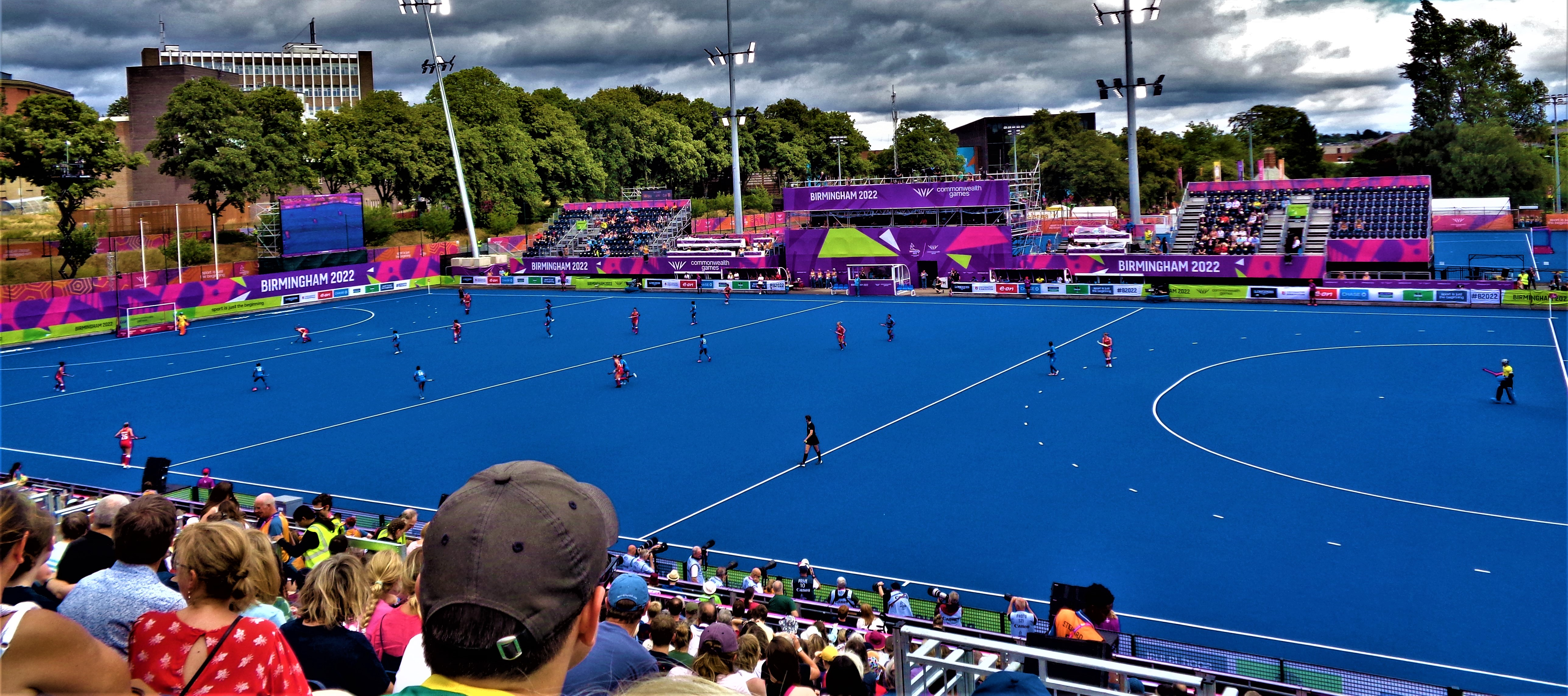
Hockey at Birmingham University during Birmingham 2022

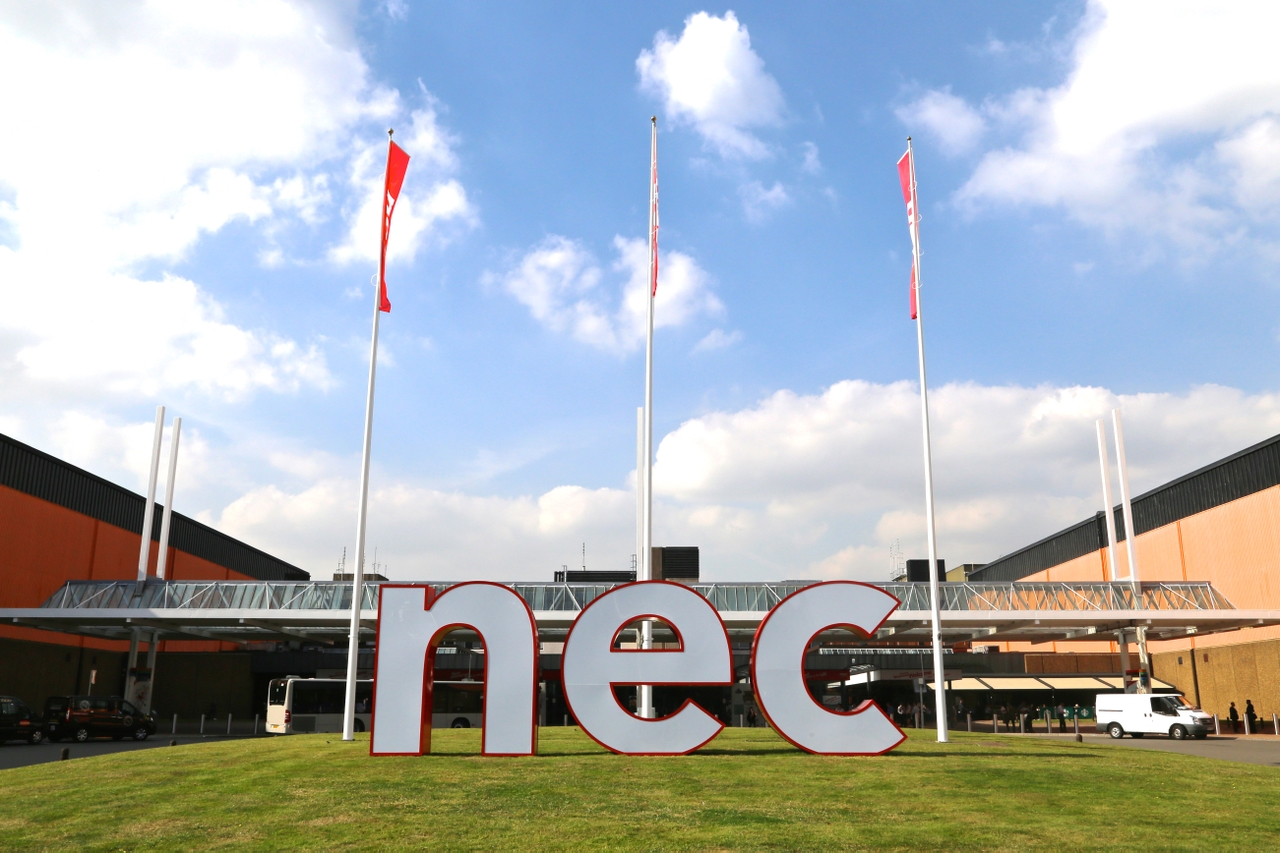
National Exhibition Centre

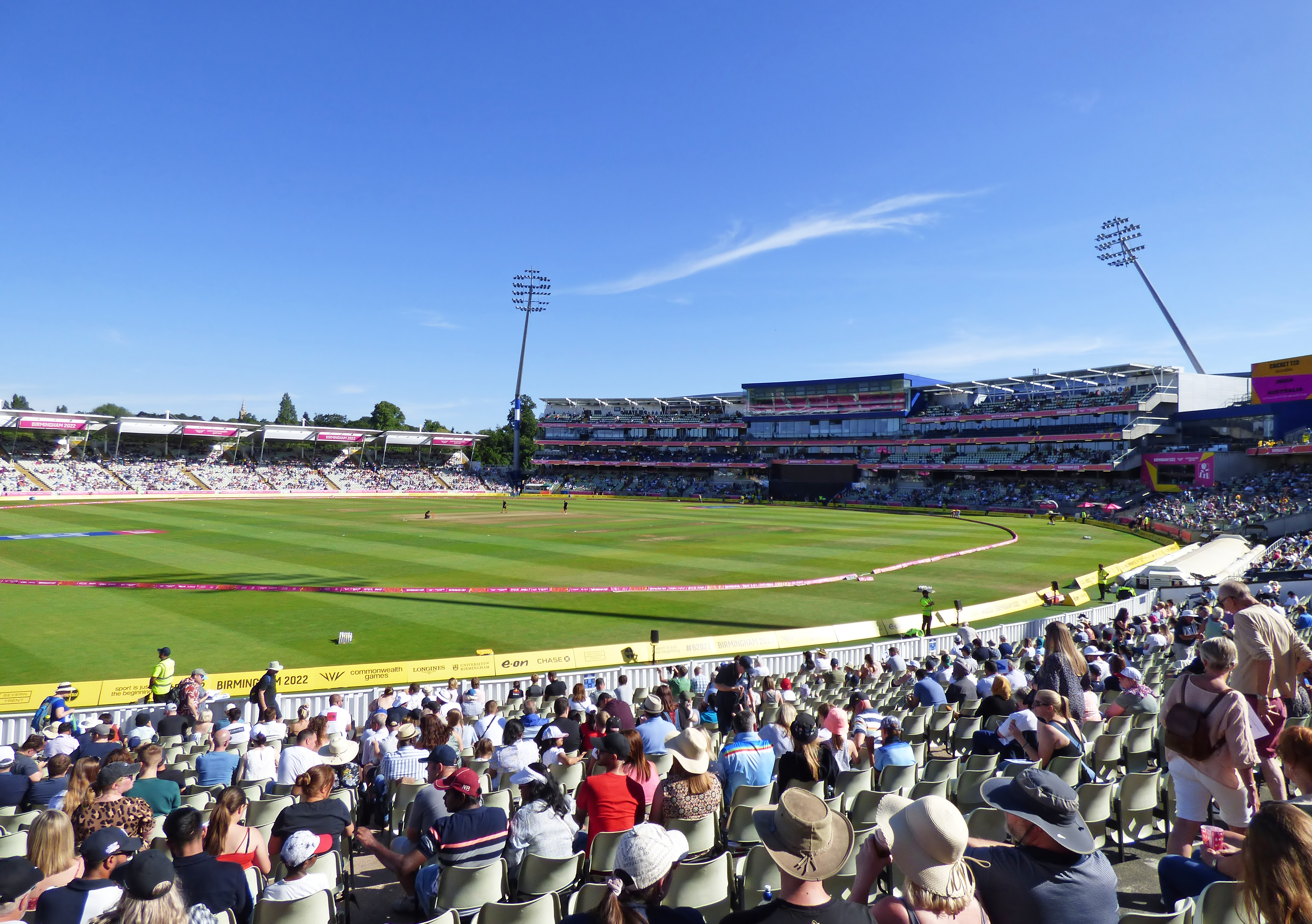
Edgbaston Cricket Ground

The 2022 Commonwealth Games took place in 15 venues spread across the West Midlands region, with seven of them, including the athletics stadium and marathon route, located in the city of Birmingham. The National Exhibition Centre complex, located on the fringes of the city in neighbouring Solihull, hosted events in its exhibition halls and at the Resorts World Arena. The six other regional hosts were Coventry, Cannock Chase, Royal Leamington Spa, Sandwell, Warwick and Wolverhampton. A sixteenth venue, the Lee Valley VeloPark in Stratford, East London, hosted the track cycling.

The following venues were used for the Games:

- Birmingham
  - Alexander Stadium (renovated) – Opening Ceremony, Closing Ceremony, Athletics
  - Utilita Arena Birmingham (existing) – Gymnastics
  - Edgbaston Cricket Ground (existing) – Cricket
  - Smithfield Market (purpose-built temporary stadia) – 3x3 Basketball, 3x3 Wheelchair Basketball, Beach Volleyball
  - Sutton Park (existing) – Triathlon
  - University of Birmingham Squash Centre (existing) – Hockey, Squash
  - Victoria Square (existing) – Marathon (finish)
- West Midlands Region
  - Cannock Chase, Staffordshire (existing) – Cycling (Mountain Bike)
  - Coventry Arena (existing) – Rugby Sevens, Judo, Wrestling
  - Victoria Park Bowling Greens, Leamington Spa (existing) – Lawn Bowls
  - Sandwell Aquatics Centre (purpose-built) – Aquatics
  - National Exhibition Centre, Solihull (existing)
    - Hall 1 – Weightlifting, Para Powerlifting
    - Hall 3 – Table Tennis, Para Table Tennis
    - Hall 4 – Boxing
    - Hall 5 – Badminton
    - Resorts World Arena – Netball
  - Myton Fields (existing) – Cycling (Road Race)
  - West Park, Wolverhampton (existing) – Cycling (Time Trials)
- London
  - Lee Valley VeloPark, London (existing) – Cycling (Track)

=== Athletes' village ===
Perry Barr was selected to be the site of the athlete's village, with plans made to demolish the former Birmingham City University campus after the university had moved to a new campus. The new village was supposed to house up to 6,500 athletes and officials during the games and then become 1,400 new homes after the games, as part of a wider regeneration effort. Because of the COVID-19 pandemic, construction of the village fell significantly behind schedule but the games' dates were not pushed back to accommodate this. Because the village would not be ready in time for the games, on 11 August 2020 the BOCCG announced that the athletes and team officials will be housed in three 'campus' villages close to competition venues at the University of Birmingham, the University of Warwick, and the NEC. Around 1,600 athletes and officials were set to be accommodated at the NEC campus, 1,900 at the University of Warwick campus, and 2,800 at the University of Birmingham campus. In 2023, a year after the games had taken place and the first of the village's housing had been finished, the site was still uninhabited and described as a 'ghost village'. In 2024, two years after the games, the council announced that it was going to sell a majority of the homes to a private developer, with a total loss of £320m expected. The large losses from the village will compound on the council's existing financial troubles.

=== Transport ===
The A34 flyover in Perry Barr was demolished in favour of a dual carriageway at ground level, cycle path and improved public transport services which were approved by Birmingham City Council in October 2019 under its £27.1 million scheme. Transport for West Midlands (TfWM) anticipated acute transport challenges across the region, including disruption from redistribution of traffic flows and therefore implemented intensive mobile CCTV monitoring and rapid response capabilities.

The city council announced in January 2020 that the existing National Express Bus Depot in Perry Barr would be demolished as the depot site would be used to construct the phase two of the athletes' village. A replacement depot will be constructed on a largely council-owned land on nearby Aston Lane, at a cost of £16 million, eight times the original estimate.

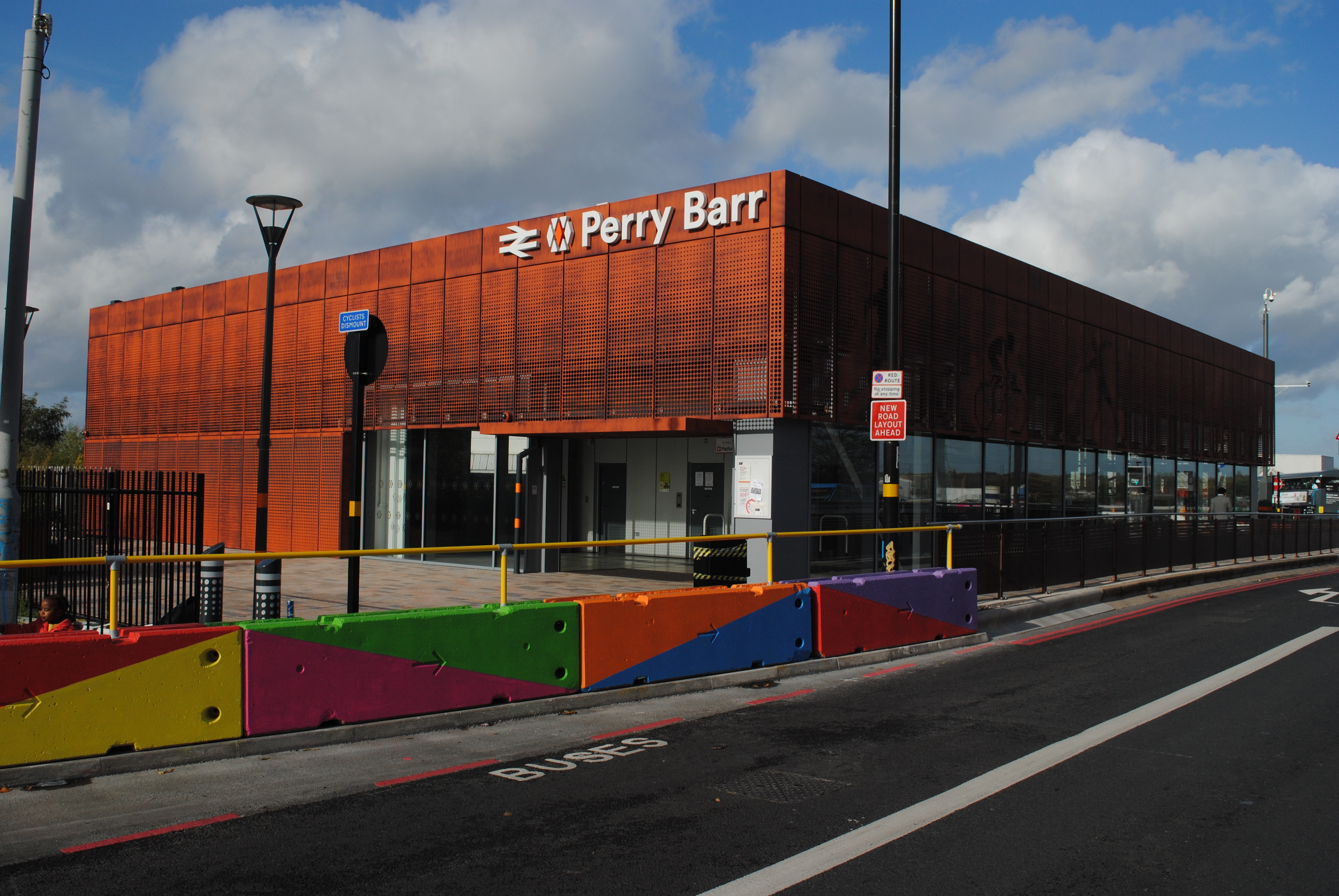
Perry Barr railway station after rebuilding

The University railway station, which serves the University of Birmingham, was planned to be renovated and was expected to be complete in time for the Games. The station would make way for the University of Birmingham, which was due to host hockey and squash events for the Games. The new station was not finished in time for the event. The Perry Barr railway station building was rebuilt and the platforms renovated as part of the £30.9 million project in Perry Barr and opened on 29 May 2022.

TfWM was scheduled to provide the city's first continuous cross-city bus route in time for the Games. The new Sprint bus route was to run an express service along the A34 and A45 between Walsall and Birmingham Airport and Solihull to Walsall via the city centre. The service will be zero-emission with priority signals and extended bus lanes, along with "a swift boarding experience" to improve journey times and reliability. In February 2020 it was announced that the West Midlands Combined Authority Board was planning to approve the £88 million funding and delivery schedule for Sprint in advance of the Games, to offer commuters and the Games visitors services to key venues including Alexander Stadium, Arena Birmingham and the Resorts World Arena. As of November 2023, the service has yet to commence running.

=== Cost and financing ===
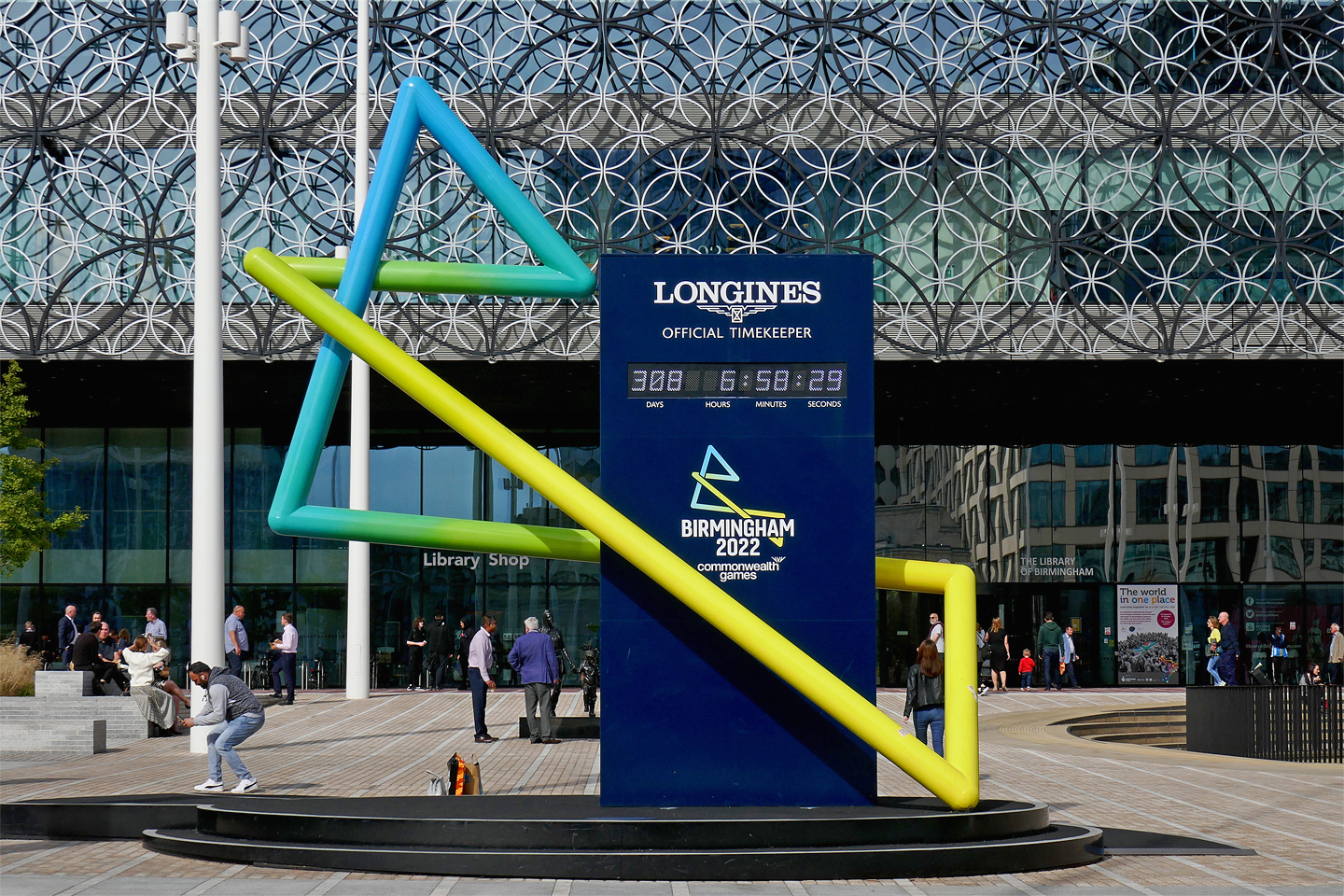
The official countdown clock for the Games in Centenary Square

At the time of submission of the bid to the CGF, the bid committee announced that the event would cost £750 million. On 25 June 2019, the British Government announced that the event costed £778 million. The British Government covered 75% (£594 million) and Birmingham City Council covered the remaining 25% (£184 million). The budget is lower than the £967 million spent on the Gold Coast 2018, but higher than the £543 million spent on the Glasgow 2014. It is set to be the most expensive sporting event in the UK since the 2012 Summer Olympics in London which cost £8.8 billion. The real cost will be published after completion.

=== Ticketing ===
Over 1.3 million tickets were sold for the 2022 Commonwealth Games, which made the event the most attended Commonwealth Games ever to take place in the United Kingdom. A ticket ballot for local residents opened on 14 July 2021, with the main public ticket ballot running from 8 to 30 September 2021.

=== Security ===
The West Midlands Police said around 3,000 officers would be deployed to patrol the 2022 Commonwealth Games. 1,000 of these were to come from West Midlands Police and 2000 from a "mutual aid" arrangement with other UK forces. Additionally, private drones were banned over a no-fly zone and 55 police dogs were also part of the security plan.

=== Festival ===
The 2022 Commonwealth Games was accompanied by a six-month long cultural event called the Birmingham 2022 Festival. It had been billed as "the biggest celebration of creativity ever seen in the region" and was taking place in the host city and throughout the West Midlands. With more than 200 events planned, it was one of the biggest cultural programmes ever hosted during the Commonwealth Games. Events took place before and after the 2022 Games (which took place between 28 July and 8 August 2022), from March to September 2022.

=== Queen's baton relay ===
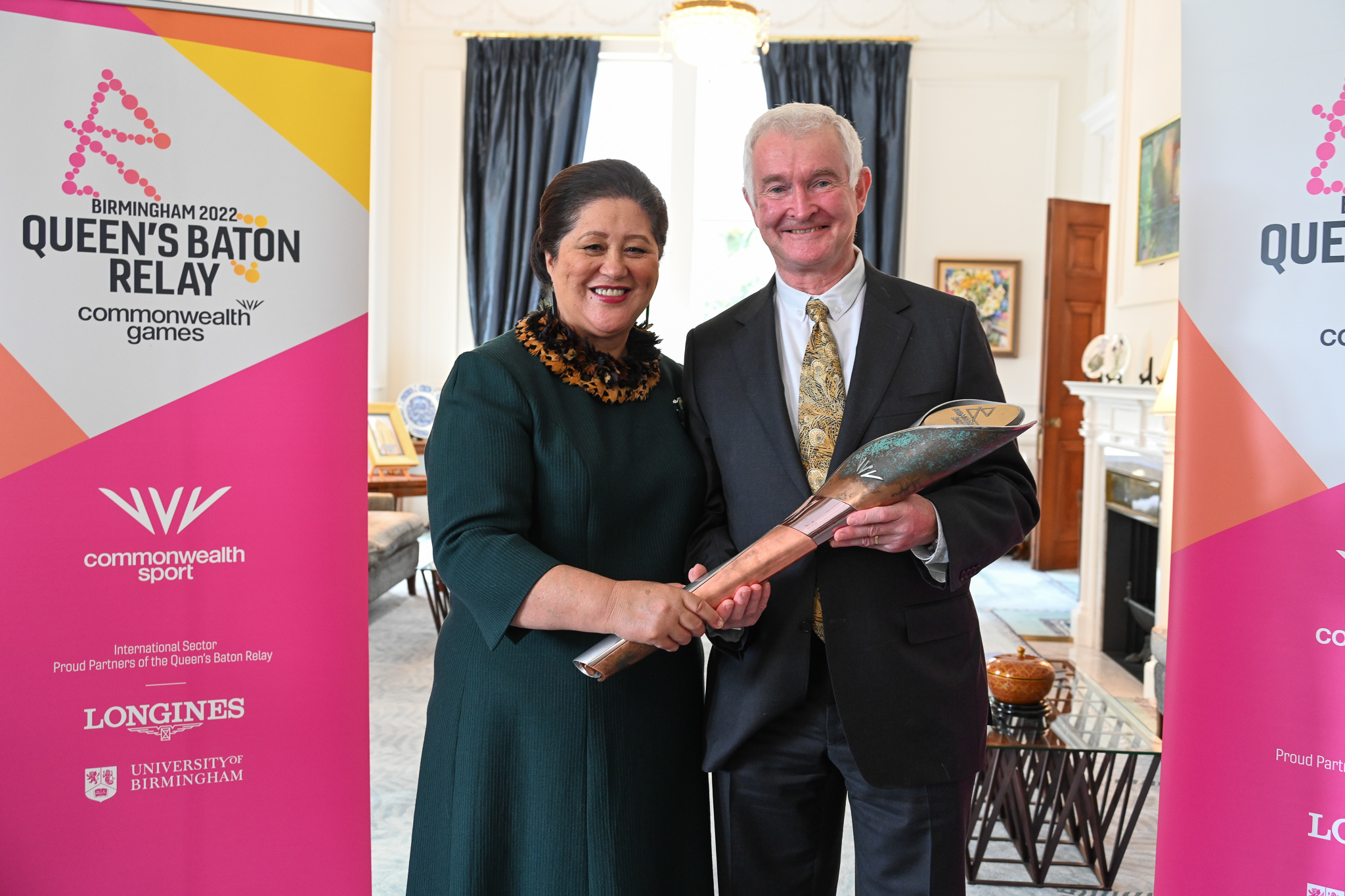
The baton being held by Governor-General of New Zealand Cindy Kiro and viceregal consort Richard Davies

The Queen's baton of the 2022 Commonwealth Games was unveiled on 29 September 2021. Designed as a collaboration between Birmingham Open Media, Raymont-Osman Product Design, Maokwo and Kajul, it is constructed using lost-wax casting, 3D Printing, copper plating and CNC machining. It incorporates copper, aluminium, and brass metals symbolising medals, and a strip of platinum in observance of the Queen's Platinum Jubilee. It also contains a 360-degree camera, an LED lighting system tied to a heart rate monitor (and displaying different effects when held by two people), and sensors to record environmental conditions—whose data will be analysed by a team at the University of Birmingham following the relay.

Laura Nyahuye, who led the team of five artists at Maokwo, stated that the baton was designed to "relate" to the countries and residents of the Commonwealth, and reflect the "authenticity and honesty" of its journey; these goals were met by avoiding the use of precious metals, and through its use of copper—which is designed to oxidise and develop a teal patina over the course of the relay.

The relay began on 7 October 2021 at Buckingham Palace in London, and lasted for 294 days—travelling through 72 Commonwealth nations and territories. After placing her message inside the baton, Queen Elizabeth II presented it to British Paralympic athlete and cyclist Kadeena Cox. During the opening ceremony, the baton was delivered to Charles, Prince of Wales, who read the Queen's message to officially open the Games.

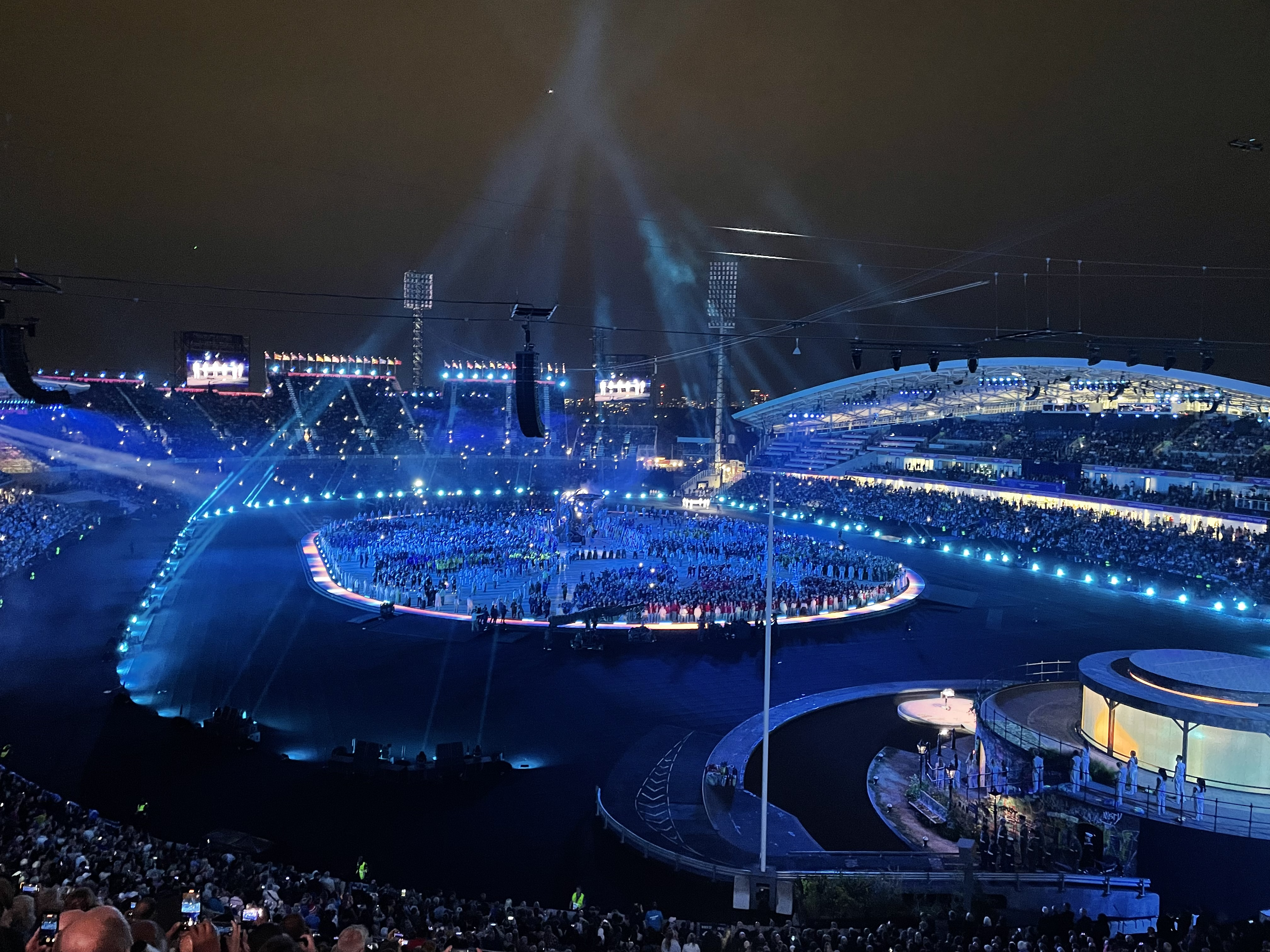
Opening Ceremony of the Birmingham 2022 Commonwealth Games

=== Opening ceremony ===
The opening ceremony of the 2022 Commonwealth Games were held at Alexander Stadium on the evening of 28 July 2022. Director Iqbal Khan stated that the ceremony would aim to showcase the "vivid and vibrant confidence" of Birmingham. It was headlined by Birmingham-based new wave band Duran Duran, while Tony Iommi of Black Sabbath–who is also a Birmingham native–performed alongside Soweto Kinch during a segment of the ceremony. The centrepiece of the ceremony was an eight-meter-tall animatronic bull, created by the London-based special effects company Artem. After the ceremony, the bull spent the duration of the games at Centenary Square.

=== Closing ceremony ===
The closing ceremony took place on 8 August 2022 at Alexander Stadium, and included the formal handover to the Australian state of Victoria, then host of the 2026 Commonwealth Games prior to its withdrawal nearly a year later before being replaced by Glasgow as the replacement host city, in a segment headlined by Vanessa Amorosi. The ceremony featured tributes to the industrial history of Birmingham, the Windrush generation and Birmingham TV show Peaky Blinders, and included performances from a number of famous West Midlands musicians and groups, including Dexys Midnight Runners, UB40, Panjabi MC, Musical Youth, Goldie, Beverley Knight, Apache Indian, Jorja Smith, the Selecter, and Laura Mvula. The grand finale featured a surprise appearance by Ozzy Osbourne in his first live performance in three years, joined by Tony Iommi and former touring members of Black Sabbath Tommy Clufetos and Adam Wakeman for a medley of "Iron Man" and "Paranoid".

== Participating associations ==
All 72 Commonwealth Games Associations sent athletes to the 2022 Commonwealth Games.

Participating Commonwealth Games Associations
- Anguilla (13)
- Antigua and Barbuda (13)
- Australia (427)
- Bahamas (28)
- Bangladesh (30)
- Barbados (65)
- Belize (13)
- Bermuda (17)
- Botswana (36)
- British Virgin Islands (19)
- Brunei (7)
- Cameroon (36)
- Canada (269)
- Cayman Islands (21)
- Cook Islands (18)
- Cyprus (53)
- Dominica (11)
- England (438) (Host)
- Eswatini (12)
- Falkland Islands (16)
- Fiji (64)
- The Gambia (16)
- Ghana (101)
- Gibraltar (23)
- Grenada (14)
- Guernsey (28)
- Guyana (32)
- India (210)
- Isle of Man (34)
- Jamaica (120)
- Jersey (28)
- Kenya (123)
- Kiribati (6)
- Lesotho (21)
- Malawi (22)
- Malaysia (103)
- Maldives (24)
- Malta (29)
- Mauritius (62)
- Montserrat (5)
- Mozambique (14)
- Namibia (33)
- Nauru (16)
- New Zealand (233)
- Nigeria (94)
- Niue (15)
- Norfolk Island (10)
- Northern Ireland (97)
- Pakistan (68)
- Papua New Guinea (34)
- Rwanda (16)
- Saint Helena (11)
- Saint Kitts and Nevis (6)
- Saint Lucia (13)
- Saint Vincent and the Grenadines (21)
- Samoa (38)
- Scotland (254)
- Seychelles (27)
- Sierra Leone (27)
- Singapore (67)
- Solomon Islands (19)
- South Africa (228)
- Sri Lanka (110)
- Tanzania (17)
- Tonga (28)
- Trinidad and Tobago (72)
- Turks and Caicos Islands (11)
- Tuvalu (6)
- Uganda (77)
- Vanuatu (17)
- Wales (201)
- Zambia (41)

The number of athletes from each association is:

Country	Athletes
England	438
Australia	427
Canada	269
Scotland	254
New Zealand	233
South Africa	228
India	210
Wales	201
Kenya	123
Jamaica	120
Sri Lanka	110
Malaysia	103
Ghana	101
Northern Ireland	97
Nigeria	94
Uganda	77
Trinidad and Tobago	72
Pakistan	68
Singapore	67
Barbados	65
Fiji	64
Mauritius	62
Cyprus	53
Zambia	41
Samoa	38
Botswana	36
Cameroon	36
Isle of Man	34
Papua New Guinea	34
Namibia	33
Guyana	32
Bangladesh	30
Malta	29
Bahamas	28
Guernsey	28
Jersey	28
Tonga	28
Seychelles	27
Sierra Leone	27
Maldives	24
Gibraltar	23
Malawi	22
Cayman Islands	21
Lesotho	21
Saint Vincent and the Grenadines	21
Solomon Islands	21
British Virgin Islands	19
Cook Islands	18
Bermuda	17
Tanzania	17
Vanuatu	17
Falkland Islands	16
The Gambia	16
Nauru	16
Rwanda	16
Niue	15
Grenada	14
Mozambique	14
Anguilla	13
Antigua and Barbuda	13
Belize	13
Saint Lucia	13
Eswatini	12
Dominica	11
Saint Helena	11
Turks and Caicos Islands	11
Norfolk Island	10
Brunei	7
Kiribati	6
Saint Kitts and Nevis	6
Tuvalu	6
Montserrat	5

== Sports ==
=== Commonwealth Games Charter ===
A new edition of the Commonwealth Games Charter came into effect for these Games. In addition to the ten core sports that were part of Gold Coast 2018 – athletics, badminton, boxing, hockey, lawn bowls, netball (for women), rugby sevens, squash, swimming and weightlifting – five new sports will be integrated into the core sports: road cycling, judo (previously optional), triathlon, table tennis, and wrestling. The charter also mandates that a number of parasports events (i.e. sports for elite athletes with disabilities) must be integrated within four core sports: athletics, lawn bowls, swimming and weightlifting (the lattermost is actually represented by a variation of powerlifting).

The charter also establishes the list of optional sports and disciplines that can be chosen by the organisation of each edition: archery (recurve), basketball (3x3 or 5x5), beach volleyball, cycling (mountain bike and track), rhythmic gymnastics, and shooting (clay target, full bore, small bore and pistol). This same rule also establishes that the following events for athletes with disabilities are optional: wheelchair basketball (3x3), para track-cycling, para-table tennis and para-triathlon. Including compulsory and optional sports (disciplines), there shall be no more than four team sports on the programme of a Commonwealth Games. If basketball (3x3) is selected from the pool of optional sports, basketball (wheelchair para 3x3) becomes an obligatory event (or vice versa), in which case the sport of basketball shall be considered as one team sport. In cases when cricket is selected from the pool of optional sports, wheelchair basketball also becomes a part of the programme and can be an exception to the four team sports limit. Respecting local demands, an extra sport or some extra events can be included in this list, but they have to be approved by the Commonwealth Games Federation two years before that edition is held. The current rules also determine gender parity, whereby men and women have an equal (or broadly equal) share of events.

=== Input to list of disciplines ===
On 22 December 2017, the BBC reported that the organisers of the games were in talks with the International Cricket Council (ICC) about the inclusion of women's cricket. In November 2018, the ICC confirmed that they have submitted a bid to include women's cricket in the Games. The bid was made in partnership with the England and Wales Cricket Board (ECB).

It was also reported that shooting was likely to be excluded from the games citing a lack of facilities around Birmingham. Shooting has been included at every Commonwealth Games since Christchurch 1974. In January 2018, the dropping of shooting from the games programme was confirmed by the then CEO of the CGF David Grevemberg. In December 2018, the International Shooting Sport Federation (ISSF) delegation including President of ISSF Vladimir Lisin and CEO of British Shooting (BS) Hamish McInnes visited Birmingham and discussed with the Birmingham organising committee to add shooting in the 2022 Commonwealth Games.

In December 2018, the World Archery Federation (WA) confirmed that they had delivered a proposal for archery's inclusion in the Games. The bid was made in partnership with Archery GB and included Aston Hall as a suggested competition venue.

In June 2019, after some time of popular searches and queries. Birmingham organising committee recommended the addition of two extra sports: para table tennis and beach volleyball. The proposal was approved by the CGF executive board.

The CGF officially announced on 13 August 2019 that the women's T20 cricket, beach volleyball and para table tennis have been included in the Games while due to infrastructure and logistics issues shooting had to be excluded and the proposal to add archery was rejected.

=== Birmingham 2022 list of disciplines ===
With the changes in the Charter, and the review of options, the major changes from Gold Coast 2018 include the addition of judo to the core sports and the local organizers' optional decision to hold a women's cricket tournament, taking advantage of local infrastructure. Returning to the Games for the first time in 24 years, due to various calendar issues, the cricket event was exclusively female for the first time.

First time events introduced at Birmingham 2022 are 3x3 basketball and its wheelchair counterpart. Birmingham will have the largest number of events available for women and athletes with disabilities in the history of the Games.

On 27 October 2020, the list of events to be held in Birmingham was revealed with 271 finals scheduled for 19 sports. However, due to the low number of athletes registered in 15 events in five sports, they were in risk to be dropped and could not yet be confirmed on that exact time. However, with the exception of the three relays planned in Paralympic sports, all were confirmed in 2021, giving a total of 283. The final program was completed with 283 finals scheduled across 20 sports. This includes 136 events for women and 134 for men, an unprecedented gender balance amongst major multi-sport events though falling short of the 2018 Commonwealth Games when a perfect gender split had been achieved. In addition, 10 mixed gender events and 35 parasport events were held.

The final list of disciplines, with the number of events in each discipline noted in the brackets, is:

- Aquatics
  - Diving (12)
  - Swimming (52)
- Athletics (58)
- Badminton (6)
- 3x3 basketball (4)
- Beach volleyball (2)
- Boxing (16)
- Cricket (1)
- Cycling
  - Mountain biking (2)
  - Road cycling (4)
  - Track cycling (20)
- Gymnastics
  - Artistic gymnastics (14)
  - Rhythmic gymnastics (6)
- Field hockey (2)
- Judo (14)
- Lawn bowls (11)
- Netball (1)
- Para powerlifting (4)
- Rugby sevens (2)
- Squash (5)
- Table tennis (11)
- Triathlon (5)
- Weightlifting (16)
- Wrestling (12)

=== Associated competitions ===
In January 2020, the Indian Olympic Association (IOA), which functions also as the Commonwealth Games Association (CGA) representing India, submitted a proposal to the CGF to host a combined archery and shooting championships in Chandigarh during January 2022. The proposal was endorsed by the National Rifle Association of India (NRAI), the Government of India, the ISSF and WA. The CGF Executive Board approved the proposal at their meeting in London which took place 21‍–‍23 February 2020, and also confirmed that the 2022 Commonwealth Shooting and Archery Championships and the 2022 Commonwealth Games will be two separately organised and funded Commonwealth Sport events. The CGF shall issue a medal table one week following the Birmingham 2022 closing ceremony that includes results from Chandigarh 2022 as a further and final ranking of competing nations and territories from the respective competitions. In July 2021, the CGF announced that the event had been cancelled due to the COVID-19 pandemic in India.

In February 2022, the CGF announced that esports would be included in the Games as a demonstration event and is in a possibility to be added at the games program at the future editions. The inaugural Commonwealth Esports Championships had separate branding, medals, and organisation and included both men and women's Dota 2, eFootball, and Rocket League events.

== Calendar ==
The schedule was as follows:

All times and dates use British Summer Time (UTC+1)

OC	Opening ceremony	●	Event competitions	1	Gold medal events	CC	Closing ceremony

July/August 2022		July				August								Events
July/August 2022		28th Thu	29th Fri	30th Sat	31st Sun	1st Mon	2nd Tue	3rd Wed	4th Thu	5th Fri	6th Sat	7th Sun	8th Mon	Events
Ceremonies		OC											CC	—N/a
Aquatics	Diving								2	3	3	2	2	12
Aquatics	Swimming		7	10	8	8	10	9						52
Athletics				4			6	8	6	5	14	15		58
Badminton			●	●	●	●	1	●	●	●	●	●	5	6
3x3 basketball			●	●	●	●	4							4
Beach volleyball				●	●	●	●	●	●	●	●	2		2
Boxing			●	●	●	●	●	●	●		●	16		16
Cricket			●	●	●		●	●	●		●	1		1
Cycling
Cycling	Mountain biking							2						26
Cycling	Road cycling								2			2		26
Cycling	Track cycling		6	4	6	4								26
Gymnastics	Artistic		1	1	2	5	5							20
Gymnastics	Rhythmic								1	1	4			20
Hockey			●	●	●	●	●	●	●	●	●	1	1	2
Judo						5	4	5						14
Lawn bowls			●	●	●	2	3	1	●	2	3			11
Netball			●	●	●	●	●	●	●	●	●	1		1
Para powerlifting									4					4
Rugby sevens			●	●	2									2
Squash			●	●	●	●	●	2	●	●	●	1	2	5
Table tennis			●	●	●	1	1	●	●	●	3	4	2	11
Triathlon			2		3									5
Weightlifting				4	3	3	3	3						16
Wrestling										6	6			12
Daily medal events			16	23	24	28	37	30	15	17	33	45	12	280
Cumulative total			16	39	63	91	128	158	173	190	223	268	280	280
July/August 2022		28th Thu	29th Fri	30th Sat	31st Sun	1st Mon	2nd Tue	3rd Wed	4th Thu	5th Fri	6th Sat	7th Sun	8th Mon	Total events
July/August 2022		July				August								Total events

== Medal table ==
* Host nation (England)

2022 Commonwealth Games
Rank	CGA	Gold	Silver	Bronze	Total
1	Australia	67	57	56	180
2	England*	58	65	53	176
3	Canada	26	32	34	92
4	India	21	16	23	60
5	New Zealand	20	12	18	50
6	Scotland	13	12	26	51
7	Nigeria	12	8	14	34
8	Wales	8	6	14	28
9	South Africa	7	9	11	27
10	Malaysia	7	8	8	23
11–43	Others	41	57	58	156
Totals (43 entries)		280	282	315	877

On 14 July 2023, the Nigerian team was disqualified as winners of the women's 4 × 100-metre relay in athletics as Nzubechi Grace Nwokocha was found in violation of anti-doping measures. This promoted England to gold, Jamaica to silver, and Australia were awarded the bronze medal. Similarly, in the men's heavyweight category in the para powerlifting, gold medal winner Sudhir was later disqualified for doping violations, and stripped off his medal. Hence, Nigeria's Ikechukwu Obichukwu was upgraded to gold, Scotland's Micky Yule to silver, and Australia's Ben Wright was awarded the bronze medal.

=== Podium sweeps ===
The podium sweeps, in which a single country won all the available medals in an event, were:

Date	Sport	Event	Team	Gold	Silver	Bronze
29 July	Swimming	Women's 200 metre freestyle	Australia	Ariarne Titmus	Mollie O'Callaghan	Madison Wilson
29 July	Swimming	Men's 400 metre freestyle	Australia	Elijah Winnington	Samuel Short	Mack Horton
31 July	Swimming	Women's 50 metre freestyle	Australia	Emma McKeon	Meg Harris	Shayna Jack
2 August	Swimming	Women's 100 metre freestyle	Australia	Mollie O'Callaghan	Shayna Jack	Emma McKeon
2 August	Swimming	Women's 800 metre freestyle	Australia	Ariarne Titmus	Kiah Melverton	Lani Pallister
2 August	Athletics	Women's 100 metres (T34)	England	Hannah Cockroft	Kare Adenegan	Fabienne André
6 August	Diving	Men's 3 metre springboard	England	Daniel Goodfellow	Jordan Houlden	Jack Laugher

== Marketing ==
=== Emblem ===
The official emblem was unveiled on 27 July 2019 at Centenary Square during the Commonwealth Social festival. It was designed by local agency RBL, based in Royal Leamington Spa, and is a jagged, triangular "B" shape formed by blue-yellow gradient lines representing the key venues of the Games in the West Midlands. The emblem is also the first to use the new branding for the CGF, as "Commonwealth Sport". It received a mainly positive reaction from locals in the city and on social media and some compared it to the emblem for the 2012 Summer Olympics and Paralympics.

=== Sponsors ===
The official sponsors of the 2022 Commonwealth Games were Longines, University of Birmingham, E.ON, Chase, Severn Trent and Reckitt.

=== Mascot ===
The official mascot for the Birmingham 2022 Commonwealth Games is Perry, a multi-coloured bull. Perry is named after an area of Birmingham, Perry Barr, within which Perry Park and the main athletics stadium, the Alexander Stadium, are located. The bull has a long history with being a symbol of Birmingham, and was positively received by the public on launch. Perry was designed by ten-year-old Emma Lou from Bolton. Perry was reproduced in coloured willow in a Birmingham 2022 display commemorating the games at the Chelsea Flower Show in 2022.

== Broadcasting ==
In July 2020, production company Sunset+Vine was appointed as the host broadcaster for the event. In October 2020, the BBC acquired the United Kingdom rights. A record 57.1 million streams were generated on the BBC's digital platforms by coverage of the 2022 Commonwealth Games, breaking the previous Commonwealth Games record. Additionally, the number of streams from the previous Commonwealth Games was more than six times higher than it was with this figure. The last event in 2018 took place in Australia, which is in a completely different time zone. 28.6 million people watched 2022 Commonwealth Games on the BBC's linear channels in total. Prior to the women's 100-metre backstroke and men's 100-metre breaststroke finals, viewership peaked at 6.6 million viewers, while the opening ceremony attracted a five-minute audience peak of 5.2 million. Audiences peaked at 5.1 million for the women's 4 × 400-metre relay final, while 4.8 million watched the closing ceremony. Other notable moments of the BBC's coverage included 4.2 million people watching the men's 200-metre final and 4.1 million people watching Adam Peaty win the 50-metre breaststroke final.

This was the last Commonwealth Games to be televised by the BBC after 68 years. Starting in 2026, TNT Sports will take over the broadcasting rights to show the 2026 Commonwealth Games in Glasgow.

== See also ==
- Commonwealth Youth Games held in the United Kingdom
  - 2000 Commonwealth Youth Games – Edinburgh (Scotland)
- Commonwealth Games held in the United Kingdom
  - 1934 British Empire Games – London (England)
  - 1958 British Empire and Commonwealth Games – Cardiff (Wales)
  - 1970 British Commonwealth Games – Edinburgh (Scotland)
  - 1986 Commonwealth Games – Edinburgh (Scotland)
  - 2002 Commonwealth Games – Manchester (England)
  - 2014 Commonwealth Games – Glasgow (Scotland)
  - 2026 Commonwealth Games – Glasgow (Scotland)

Preceded by Gold Coast	Commonwealth Games; Birmingham; XXII Commonwealth Games	Succeeded by Glasgow
