= List of esports leagues and tournaments =

The following is a list of recurring esports tournaments in alphabetical order, split between active and defunct tournaments.

== Active ==
| Name | Description | Location / Regions participating | Years active |
|---|---|---|---|
| Arena of Valor World Cup | The top competition for Arena of Valor. Teams based on regions to compete for the strongest region in AoV. | Hong Kong/Macau/Taiwan (2018–present); United States and Canada (2018–2019); Europe (2018); Thailand (2018–Present); Vietnam (2018–present); Malaysia/Singapore/Philippines (2018–2019, 2021–present); Indonesia (2018–present); South America (2018); South Korea (2018–present); China (2018–present); Japan (2019–present); Brazil (2021–present) | 2018–present |
| Arena of Valor International Championship | The top competition for Arena of Valor. Teams compete for the strongest team in AoV. | Hong Kong/Macau/Taiwan (2017–present); United States and Canada (2018); Europe (2018–2019); Thailand (2017–Present); Vietnam (2017–present); Malaysia/Singapore/Philippines (2018–2019, 2021–present); Indonesia (2017–present); South America (2018); South Korea (2017–present); China (2018–present); India (2018); Japan (2019, 2021–present) | 2017–present |
| Superliga | The Spanish official European Regional League of the League of Legends game. One of the oldest ones in Europe (named División de Honor in early years) and one of the biggest professional player incubators. | Spain | 2012–present |
| Amazon University Esports | European collegiate esports partnership sponsored by tech company Amazon, with member organisations in Spain, the United Kingdom and Italy. Main games include League of Legends, Teamfight Tactics, and Clash Royale. | Spain; United Kingdom; Italy | 2020–present |
| Battle.net World Championship Series (BlizzCon) | StarCraft II (SC2), World of Warcraft (WoW), Overwatch and Hearthstone world championship series run by Blizzard Entertainment | Worldwide | |
| Call of Duty League | A Call of Duty franchised based league that is slated to begin in January 2020 replacing the Call of Duty World League. It is played on Call of Duty: Modern Warfare for PlayStation 4 | Worldwide | 2020–present |
| Capcom Cup | Street Fighter tournament sponsored by Capcom | United States | 2013–present |
| COBX Masters | Dota 2 and Counter-Strike: Global Offensive competition held across several cities in India. | India | 2018–present |
| Code Wars | Inter-school technology event organized by Code Warriors, includes gaming event which features many games including FIFA. | India | 1997–present |
| Commonwealth Esports Championships | Esports competition held concurrently with the Commonwealth Games. | Member states of the Commonwealth of Nations and their overseas territories | 2022–present |
| CompeteLeague | An amateur esports leagues circuit and broadcast provider since January 2016. Currently operates the largest amateur League of Legends circuit on European and North American servers | Canada, Europe, Mexico, United States and other North American countries | 2016–present |
| CS:GO Majors | The series of Counter-Strike: Global Offensive premier tournaments sponsored by Valve, the game's developer. | Worldwide | 2013–present |
| Cybergamer | The premier esports leagues for the Oceania region. | Australia, New Zealand and other Oceanic countries | 2007–present |
| Dew Arena | Multiple Games Tournament, organised by Mountain Dew | Worldwide | 2016–present |
| Dragon Ball FighterZ World Tour | The Dragon Ball FighterZ World Tour is a global tournament series for the smash-hit fighting game by Bandai Namco Entertainment, Inc. | Worldwide | 2018–present |
| DreamHack | The world's largest computer festival, the event includes major esports competitions. | Sweden, Canada | 1994–present |
| eGames | Tournament between countries. | Worldwide | 2016–present |
| Electronic Sports League | | Worldwide | 2000–present |
| Electronic Sports World Cup | | Worldwide | 2003–present |
| ESL India Premiership | First Indian esports event with pool of $7000 took place in Mumbai, India | India | 2015–2020 |
| ESOGA Esports & Online Gaming Association | ESOGA provides an esports league for youth hosted by professional coaches. Players participate in weekly gameplay sessions featuring monthly challenges, tournaments, events, and prizes. Additional services and software are offered to organizations to host their own esports and online gaming experiences across the United States and Canada. | United States and Canada | 2019—present |
| European Gaming League | A competition that focuses on the United Kingdom and Europe | United Kingdom | 2007–present |
| Evolution Championship Series | The largest fighting games competition in the United States, the tournament is very important for competition in the genre. | United States | 1996–present |
| Apex Legends Global Series | A competition for the battle royale Apex Legends with a prize pool of US$3 million. It starts with the online tournaments, then goes to the premier tournaments, and ends with the major tournaments. | Worldwide | 2020– present |
| eXTREMESLAND | Asian Tournament for CS:GO players. The final event is held in China. | Australia, China, India, Indonesia, Japan, Malaysia, Mongolia, New Zealand, Philippines, Singapore South Korea, Taiwan, Thailand, Turkey, Vietnam along with qualifying Oceanic and Middle Eastern countries | 2016–present |
| FIFA Interactive World Cup (FIWC) | An annual video gaming competition officially organized by FIFA and its presenting partner EA Sports. | Worldwide | 2004–present |
| Fortnite Championship Series (FNCS), previously Fortnite World Cup | A series of quarterly Fortnite tournaments, usually ending with a year-end Global Championship. The prize pool of 2019’s Fortnite World Cup was $30,000,000. | Worldwide | 2019–present |
| GameBattles UK | GameBattles UK is a British esports League with daily competitions for major console games played in the UK is famous for its high value cash tournaments | Great Britain | 2017–present |
| Garena World (previously Garena Star League) | A tournament for all games in Garena esports, base in Bangkok, Thailand | Thailand ASEAN | 2013–present |
| Global Starcraft II League | Originally holding exclusive rights to broadcast Starcraft II in South Korea, the tournament has remained central to the Starcraft II competitions. | South Korea | 2010–present |
| Halo Championship Series | 343 industries own esports league for the Halo series. The prize pool for the 2016 series is currently 2 million. | Worldwide | 2014–present |
| Hero Pro League | Organised by Hero Entertainment and a flagship tournament for Crisis Action and King of Warship. Played mostly in China and South-East Asia. | Worldwide | 2019 |
| High School Esports League | The High School Esports League (HSEL) is a league of over 3,100 schools and 100,000 students. HSEL holds seasonal tournaments for high school students. Founded in 2012, they are the first and largest high school league. They offer competition in games such as Counter-Strike: Global Offensive, Minecraft, Overwatch, Rainbow 6: Siege, and Rocket League, as well as many more. | United States and Canada | 2012—Present |
| ISEA | The Interstate Scholastic Esports Alliance (ISEA) is a nationwide coalition of educator-run scholastic esports organizations serving students and schools in the K-12 space. They have over 65,000 students and 2000 schools in their 12 member scholastic league. Their members consist of IHSEA (Illinois), IAHSEA (Iowa), IEN (Indiana), MiHSEF (Michigan), MNLV (Minnesota), MOSEF (Missouri), NSESA (Nebraska), GSE (New Jersey), OKSE (Oklahoma), TEXSEF (Texas), WSSEA (Washington), and WIHSEA (Wisconsin). | United States | 2018–Present |
| Intel Extreme Masters | Organized by Turtle Entertainment, which also runs the Electronic Sports League, the Intel Extreme Masters was created to expand beyond the ESL's mostly European focus. | Worldwide | 2007–present |
| International Esports Federation | IeSF runs the only World Championships for official national teams. | Worldwide | 2009–present |
| King Pro League | Tournament for Arena of Valor based in Shanghai, China. | China | 2017–present |
| KO Fight Nights | This is an esports competition for the game title Street Fighter V with the finals held in New Delhi. | India | 2018–2020 |
| Konami Arcade Championship | An annual esports competition involved active Konami (and its subdivision Bemani) arcade titles. The finals were held in Japan in a conference area or Japan Amusement Expo (since 2015). | Japan (2011–present); Australia, Hong Kong, Macau, Malaysia, New Zealand, Philippines Singapore, South Korea, Taiwan, Thailand (2012-2020, 2022–present); United States (2016-2020, 2022–present); Canada and Mexico (2017-2020, 2022–present) | 2011–present |
| League of Legends Champions Korea | The primary League of Legends competition in South Korea. | South Korea | 2012 – present |
| League of Legends EMEA Championship | The primary League of Legends competition in Europe. | Europe | 2013 – present |
| League of Legends Pro League | The top level League of Legends competition in China. | China | 2013 – present |
| League of Legends Rift Rivals | Cross-regional game for League of Legends. | Australia, Brazil, China, Europe, Hong Kong, Japan, Macau, New Zealand, South Korea, Taiwan, Turkey, Vietnam, United States and remaining North American nations | 2017 – present |
| League of Legends World Championship | Flagship annual tournament of League of Legends, recently recognized as the most played video game in the world. Considered one of the, if not the most watched esports event in the world with the 2016 League of Legends World Championship achieving 43 million unique viewers and 14.7 million peak concurrent viewership. The final prize pool for 2016 League of Legends World Championship, which included fan contributions via purchase of in-game items, was worth $6.7 million. | Worldwide | 2011 – present |
| LeagueGaming.com NHL | EA Sports NHL 18 EASHL Competitive Free and Money League. For Xbox and PlayStation | Canada, United States, Europe | 2003–Present |
| Liga Mexicana de Videojuegos | The most relevant esports League in Mexico, the season 0 started on 2016 as a ranking cup. The pro tournaments began February 2017. The Master Cup has Halo and League of Legends as well as a Pro Cup which also includes FIFA, Pro Evolution Soccer, Street Fighter, Counter-Strike: Global Offensive and Overwatch. The prize pool for the first season was $1,000,000 MXN (US$50,000). | Mexico | 2016–present |
| Mid-Season Invitational | The annual League of Legends international tournament hosted by Riot Games in the middle of years. It is the second most important international League of Legends tournament aside from the World Championship. | Worldwide | 2015 – present |
| Military Gaming League | The only US military and veteran exclusive esport league. Competitions are held online, and across bases. | United States | 2018–present |
| Mind Sports South Africa | MSSA is an affiliate of IeSF. MSSA is the controlling authority for all esports in South Africa as per the Sport and Recreation Act. MSSA runs all official events in South Africa from School to National Championship level. Through MSSA gamers can achieve Protea Colours and bursaries to attend university. | South Africa | 1999–present |
| MLBB Professional League (MPL) | MPL is the national esports tournament for Mobile Legends: Bang Bang | Indonesia, Philippines, Malaysia, Singapore, Myanmar | 2017–present |
| Mobile Legends: Bang Bang Southeast Asia Cup | MSC is an annual esports tournament for Mobile Legends: Bang Bang in Southeast Asia | Southeast Asia | 2017–present |
| Mobile Legends: Bang Bang World Championship | The premier annual Mobile Legends: Bang Bang tournament hosted by the game's developer Moonton. | Worldwide | 2019–present |
| NAAGL | North American Amateur Gaming League | United States | 2020–present |
| NAOR | North American Online Racing is a stock car sim racing league on the IRacing platform | United States | 2015–present |
| NBA 2K League | This is NBA esports league, founded by Take-Two Interactive and NBA | United States, Canada, China, Mexico | 2017–present |
| NGWT | Neo Geo World Tour - officially supported by SNK, the global esports tour features games from The King of Fighters series, and a high score attack challenge from the Metal Slug series. Season 1 in 2018 covered 13 global stops, including a grand finals event in Hong Kong. In 2019's season 2, the event grew to 32 global stops, including the grand finals event in Taipei. | Worldwide | 2018–present |
| NGL Summer Tournament | This is a Bangladeshi esports tournament organized by the National Gaming League for League of Legends. | Bangladesh | 2018–present |
| NitroLeague | One of the largest Rocket League leagues for the "DACH"-region (Germany, Austria, Switzerland). | Germany, Austria, Switzerland | 2018–present |
| North East Championship | This is a month long-tournament with game titles including Clash Royale, Dota 2 and FIFA. The aim of the tournament is to promote esports in the Northeastern region of India which has been underrepresented in the Indian esports space. | India | 2018–present |
| Pacific Championship Series | A League of Legends competition held in Southeast Asia (excluding Vietnam), Taiwan, (Note: Taiwan is referred to as "Taipei" in official publications by the PCS.) Hong Kong, and Macau | Indonesia, Malaysia, Philippines, Singapore, Thailand, Hong Kong, Macau and Taiwan | 2019–present |
| Olympic Esports Week | A 3 day competition by the International Olympic Committee, with games inspired by the olympic games like Archery (Tic Tac Bow), Baseball (WBSC eBASEBALL™: POWER PROS), Chess (Chess.com), Cycling (Zwift), Dance (Just Dance 2023 Edition), Motor sport (Gran Turismo), Sailing (Virtual Regatta) and Shooting (ISSF Challenge featuring Fortnite) | Worldwide | 2023–present |
| Premier Gaming League | Premier Gaming League (PGL) is an online esports buy-in tournament hosting site. Buy-in tournaments with the winner taking all. Prizes range from hundreds to thousands of dollars. Mostly hosts Fortnite and Call of Duty tournaments. | United States | 2018–present |
| Pharaoh's Conclave | Pharaoh's Conclave (PCX) is the connector of the esports industry, helping the community identify entry points into and navigate pathways through the esports industry to move from amateur to professional (i.e., "pub to pro"). PCX hosts tournaments that feature an Olympic medley-style of play, where teams compete across a number of different games and the winner is the team with the highest score overall. | United States | 2017–present |
| PGL | PGL, otherwise known as Professional Gamers League, is one of the leading European companies in the field of esports events. It is based in Bucharest, Romania and it is headed by Silviu Stroie, who is also the vice-president of the International eSports Federation (IeSF). | Romania | 2002–present |
| Play It Forward eSports Tournament | The Play It Forward eSports Tournament is a live-streamed event where the worlds of eSports, professional athletes, online gamers, philanthropy, and cancer-fighting technology are coming together for a unique experience to raise hospital funds and help find a cure for cancer through gaming. Traditional professional athletes such as Michael Irvin will join eSports athletes to play video games along with children and family members who have had or are having medical treatment at Children's Health in Dallas, Texas. First tournament stream for the Play It Forward eSports Event is on May 18, 2019. Watch Live on Twitch. playitforwardesports.com | United States | 2019–present |
| PlayVS | PlayVS launched in 2018 as a high school esports platform and has since expanded to youth leagues as well. PlayVS is partnered with the National Federation of State High School Associations. Current title offerings across high school, youth leagues include League of Legends, Rocket League, Mario Kart, Super Smash Bros. Ultimate, Overwatch 2, NBA 2K and Madden. | United States, Canada | 2018–present |
| PUBG Mobile India Series | A tournament for PlayerUnknown's Battlegrounds in India with a prize pool of ₹10,000,000. It is believed to be the second biggest eSports tournament held in India as of February 2019. | India | 2019–2020 |
| Rocket League Championship Series | Official Rocket League tournament run by the game's developer | Worldwide | 2016–present |
| Six Invitational | The premier annual Rainbow Six Siege tournament hosted by the game's developer Ubisoft Entertainment. | Worldwide | 2017–present |
| SMITE World Championship | The flagship tournament for SMITE, a third-person MOBA developed by Hi-Rez Studios. The tournament (currently) involves 14 teams from 6 regions and US$1 million in prize money. | United States | 2014–present |
| SparKing Tournaments | Indie Game Publishing and Development Company in Winston - Salem, North Carolina. Creating proprietary games for local tournament play. Tournaments are held sporadically based upon demand and player availability in a given area. YUGA 2022, Apoloi | United States | 2014–present |
| Taiwan Excellence Gaming Cup | The Taiwan Excellence Cup has been one of the most consistent esports tournaments in India and features the games Dota 2 and CS:GO. | India | 2013–present |
| Tekken World Tour | The Tekken World Tour is an international tournament series for the iconic fighting franchise Tekken. Co-sponsored by the game's developer, Bandai Namco Entertainment. | Worldwide | 2017–present |
| The International | The premier annually held Dota 2 tournament. | Worldwide | 2011–present |
| Toribash Clan League | Official Toribash clan tournament, run by the game's developer, held irregularly | Worldwide | 2007–present |
| Toribash Single Player Cup | Official Toribash singleplayer tournament, run by the game's developer, held irregularly | Worldwide | 2015–present |
| Toribash World Championship | Official Toribash one-by-one tournament, run by the game's developer, held irregularly | Worldwide | 2011–present |
| U Cypher | Indian esports competition for Dota 2, CS:GO, Tekken and Real Cricket. The prize pool in the first edition was ₹51,00,000. | India | 2017 |
| UGC Events | The Ultimate Gaming Championship has specialized in running experiential events since 2006. Generally recognized for their Halo tournament offerings, the UGC has recently branched out into other top console titles including Gears of War and Super Smash Brothers. During a 6-month period in 2016, the UGC ran more events than any other organizer with prize pools totaling US$310,000. | United States | 2006–present |
| UMG Gaming | UMG Gaming has been holding gaming events mainly for the Call of Duty franchise since 2012, it has become a staple event for teams and events are considered major events where all professional teams compete. | United States | 2012–present |
| Valorant Champions Tour | International tier-1 tournament made up of teams in each of the 4 Valorant regional leagues. | Worldwide | 2021–present |
| VCT Americas | Regional league participating in the Valorant Champions Tour for teams in North, South, and Central America. | Teams are currently based in United States, Brazil, Argentina, Chile, includes entire Americas region | 2023–present |
| VCT EMEA | Regional league participating in the Valorant Champions Tour for teams in Europe, the Middle East, and Africa. | Teams are currently based in France, Netherlands, Spain, Turkey, United Kingdom, Ukraine, includes entire EMEA region | 2023–present |
| VCT Pacific | Regional league participating in the Valorant Champions Tour for teams in the Asia-Pacific region. | Teams are currently based in Hong Kong, Singapore, Japan, South Korea, Indonesia, India, Thailand, Philippines, includes entire APAC region | 2023–present |
| VCT China | Regional league participating in the Valorant Champions Tour for teams in China. | China | 2024–present |
| Wargaming.net League | Tournament flagships from World of Tanks. | Worldwide | 2013–present |
| World Cyber Games | Founded in South Korea, the WCG was one of the largest esports tournaments in existence, and was held annually. | Worldwide | 2000–2013, 2019–present |
| PUBG Mobile Global Open | PUBG Mobile Global Open is the official open global tournament for PUBG Mobile Esports For every year. Best teams from around the world plays here via regional qualification tournaments. | Worldwide | 2024–Present |
| PUBG Mobile World Cup | PUBG Mobile World Cup, abbreviated as PMWC (formerly known as PUBG Mobile World Invitational, PMWI) is the official mid-season world tournament for PUBG Mobile organized by Krafton and Level Infinite. | Worldwide | 2020–Present |
| PUBG Mobile Global Championship | PUBG Mobile Global Championship is the final major event of PUBG Mobile Esports For every year. Best teams from around the world were invited or qualified for the event. | Worldwide | 2020–Present |
| PUBG Mobile Campus Championship | PUBG Mobile Campus Championship (PMCC) 2021 is a Esport tournament by Tencent. It focuses on students side of its Player-Base. | Worldwide | 2018–Present |
| Free Fire World Series | The qualified 2 teams from India is out of Free Fire World Series 2021 due to COVID-19. | Worldwide | 2021 |
| Battlegrounds Mobile India Series | A tournament for Battlegrounds Mobile India in India, organised by Krafton. | India | 2021–Present |
| Battlegrounds Mobile Pro Series | Battlegrounds Mobile India Pro Series (BMPS) is India's highest level professional league for Battlegrounds Mobile India, Organised by Krafton | India | 2022–Present |

== Defunct ==
| Name | Description | Location | Years active |
|---|---|---|---|
| Apex | Super Smash Bros. tournament with side events for Pokémon, fighting games, etc. | United States | 2009–2016 |
| ClanBase | Online & Offline event, known for its ladders and cups. With the EuroCup being the most prominent | Europe | 1998–2013 |
| Cyberathlete Professional League | Originally running events in the United States, the CPL has been shut down and then reinstated as a competition in Shenyang, China. | China | 1997–2008 |
| GameArena | Original esports competition leader for Oceania before supplanted by Cybergamer in 2007. | Oceania | 2002–2014 |
| Tenkaichi Otogesai (天下一音ゲ祭) | A four-way collaboration arcade tournament between Bandai Namco, Konami, Sega and Taito, and organised by Japan Amusement Industry Association (JAIA) (previously Amusement Machine Operators' Union (AOU)) involving crossover songs from respective titles playable (and used for competition phases) to participating arcades. The finals are held in Japan Amusement Expo on the competition's succeeding year. | Japan | 2014-2019 |
| Pro Gaming League | Modeled after the Major League Gaming tournament, the league shut down after a few years due to lack of popularity. | Canada | 2007–2009 |
| Sri Lanka Cyber Games (SLCG) | The flagship Esports and competitive video games festival in Sri Lanka. Hosted since 2008, the event organized by Gamer.LK brings participants from across Sri Lanka together as they battle it out across the most popular Esports titles in the country. | Sri Lanka | 2008–2018 |
| Tougeki – Super Battle Opera | Based in Japan, the competition is among the most important fighting game tournaments. | Japan | 2003–2012 |
| Professional Gamers League | The PGL was early professional gamers league based in the United States formed in Nov 1997. The first world finals were hosted in Seattle in Jan 1998. Though short lived, they held one of the earliest professional Starcraft tournaments in Nov 1998. | United States | 1997–1998 |
| World e-Sports Masters | Originally known as the World e-Sports games and based in Seoul, the competition has since moved to China and been renamed the World e-Sports Masters. | China | 2005–2010 |
| World Series of Video Games | The tournament held events around the world featuring a variety of games until its cancellation. | Worldwide | 2006–2007 |
| Overwatch League | Premier professional esports league for Overwatch. Competition and team structure mimics North American sports league with city-based teams and regular season play. | United States, China, Canada, South Korea, United Kingdom, France | 2017-2023 |
| Major League Gaming | Among the largest competitions in the United States, the MLG has held competitions across the country featuring a variety of games. | United States | 2002–2024 |
