= Ozzy the Bull =

Animatronic bull sculpture in Birmingham, UK

Ozzy
- Ozzy at Birmingham New Street railway station in 2025
- Artist: Artem
- Year: 2023
- Medium: Glass-reinforced plastic
- Subject: Bull
- Dimensions: 10 m (33 ft)
- Location: Birmingham New Street railway station, Birmingham, UK; 52.47792°N 1.89888°W

Ozzy, more commonly known as Ozzy the Bull and previously informally named the Raging Bull, is a large steampunk-style animatronic bull sculpture originally created by special effects company Artem for the 2022 Commonwealth Games opening ceremony in Birmingham, United Kingdom. It measures 10 metres (33 ft) in height. It temporarily resided in Centenary Square following the ceremony until September 2022, before being redesigned for permanent indoor display. Renamed Ozzy after the Black Sabbath frontman Ozzy Osbourne in June 2023, it was unveiled at Birmingham New Street railway station in July that year and has remained there since, occasionally being dressed in various outfits for holidays and events.

== History ==
=== Commonwealth Games and Centenary Square ===
The mechanical sculpture was originally created by special effects company Artem for the opening ceremony of the 2022 Commonwealth Games in Birmingham. The company's team of 60 people took five months to build the animatronic.

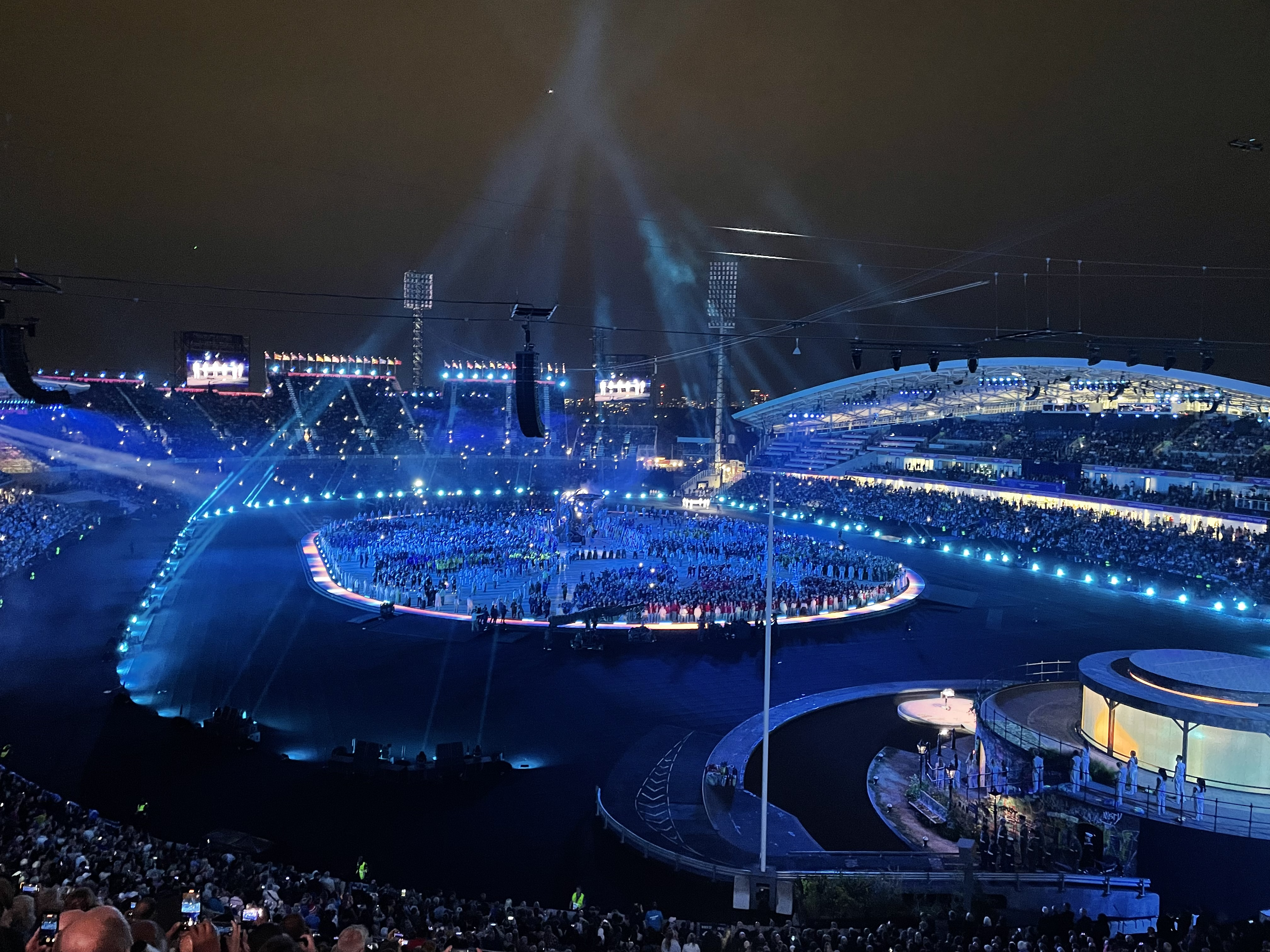
The animatronic could be seen in the centre of the stadium during the 2022 Commonwealth Games opening ceremony.

During the ceremony in Alexander Stadium, directly following a performance by Ginny Lemon, the sculpture entered the stadium pulled by chains which were intended to represent the chains used in the slave trade. It was adorned with a mask, upon which was written the names of the 21 people killed by the Birmingham pub bombings. It billowed steam, and its eyes glowed. The bull was then depicted being 'tamed' by the ceremony's main character, Stella, who then climbed atop the animatronic and rode it around the stadium. Later, the animatronic swayed its head to the beat during a performance by Duran Duran.

Ozzy, then known as the Raging Bull, rearing and snorting while on Centenary Square on the final day of the Games.

Following the ceremony, it was put on display in Centenary Square, initially only for the rest of the Games' 12-day duration. Here, it regularly had animated displays during which its eyes flashed red, accompanied by smoke. Quickly, it became one of the most popular attractions in the city. It was initially, informally, named the Raging Bull. As it was not intended to operate as a permanent outdoor sculpture, it was announced that following the end of the Games, the bull was to be dismantled, which led to public outcry. A petition to save the sculpture gained nearly 10,000 signatures. In response, Birmingham City Council confirmed that the sculpture would instead stay in Centenary Square until the end of September 2022, though council leader Ian Ward stated that it would need to be moved indoors prior to winter for its protection, and that parts of the sculpture would need replacement. On 22 September, by which time thousands of people had visited the bull, it was moved from Centenary Square.

=== Redesign and Birmingham New Street station ===
By 26 September, the animatronic had been taken to a derelict car park on Great Tindal Street, prompting a negative reaction from individuals on social media. Council members stated that the sculpture would be undergoing repairs and restoration. Artem gave the sculpture a significant redesign, allowing its use for permanent indoor display. A public vote was held which chose a new name for the bull, during which 2,000 names were put forward and over 28,000 votes were cast. Shortlisted yet unsuccessful names from the vote included Bostin (meaning 'excellent' in Midlands dialect), Brummie (after the name for people from Birmingham), and Boulton (after the 18th-century industrialist Matthew Boulton). The result with 70% of the votes, announced on 22 June 2023 on the television show BBC Breakfast, was Ozzy, after Black Sabbath singer Ozzy Osbourne. Birmingham native Osbourne had played at the 2022 Commonwealth Games' closing ceremony. He stated that he was "absolutely blown away" by the decision.

Having been acquired for the city as part of a joint project between Network Rail and the West Midlands Combined Authority, the sculpture arrived at Birmingham New Street railway station on 7 July 2023, being brought in through the doors of the station in pieces. Installation work began overnight. After being reassembled behind a set of screens and undergoing movement tests by Network Rail, the sculpture was unveiled at Birmingham New Street railway station on 26 July. This unveiling coincided with a cultural festival organised by Birmingham City Council. The wife of Ozzy Osbourne, Sharon Osbourne, as well as Mayor of Birmingham Andy Street and boxer Delicious Orie attended the unveiling.

On 23 September 2023, Black Sabbath: The Ballet premiered globally, and fans of the band took selfies at the bull, consolidating the sculpture as a place to do so. For December 2023, the bull was given large bauble earrings for Christmas. On 28 March 2024, a small part within the animatronic came loose and its head was kept still for around a month before repairs took place in April. Upon the bull's first anniversary of its existence in Birmingham New Street station in July 2024, a 'birthday' celebration was held. In 2026, Visit Birmingham and the West Midlands partnered with Network Rail to use the New Street Station concourse to depict 20th-century period-inspired scenic elements. In advance of the release of the film Peaky Blinders: The Immortal Man in March 2026, the bull was adorned with a large flat cap so as to appear as one of the franchise's characters, Tommy Shelby, and a red carpet was laid out beneath the sculpture. In response, a campaign was launched by Birmingham residents in opposition to dressing up the bull in "daft hats and silly outfits". A West Midlands Growth Company spokesperson said that the Peaky Blinders activation was intended to "instill pride among residents by reinforcing the West Midlands' role as the birthplace of the story and its characters." On the first anniversary of the death of Ozzy Osbourne on 22 July 2026, the bull was dressed as Osbourne. For both the Tommy Shelby and Ozzy Osbourne impersonations, an instant photo facility was added for visitors to obtain keepsake portraits with the bull.

== Design ==
The sculpture's eyes glow.

It is in a steampunk style. Prior to its redesign, the bull was 10 metres (33 ft) in height, 4.5 metres (15 ft) wide, and 15 metres (49 ft) long. its outer layer was made of a dense foam, and it was carried by a telehandler weighing 17 tonnes which was a part of its design, sourced from Europe. It weighed 2.5 tonnes in total. It was designed so that its legs, head and tail could be manually operated by a crew of technicians and puppeteers during and after the Commonwealth Games ceremony; the head required two puppeteers, whereas the legs were operated by a technician with a computer. Ropes and pulleys are used to operate the tail.

Following its redesign, its exterior "armour" is made of glass-reinforced plastic and the telehandler has been removed. At present, Ozzy remains 10 metres (33 ft) in height.

== See also ==
- Bullring, Birmingham
