= 2022 Commonwealth Games opening ceremony =

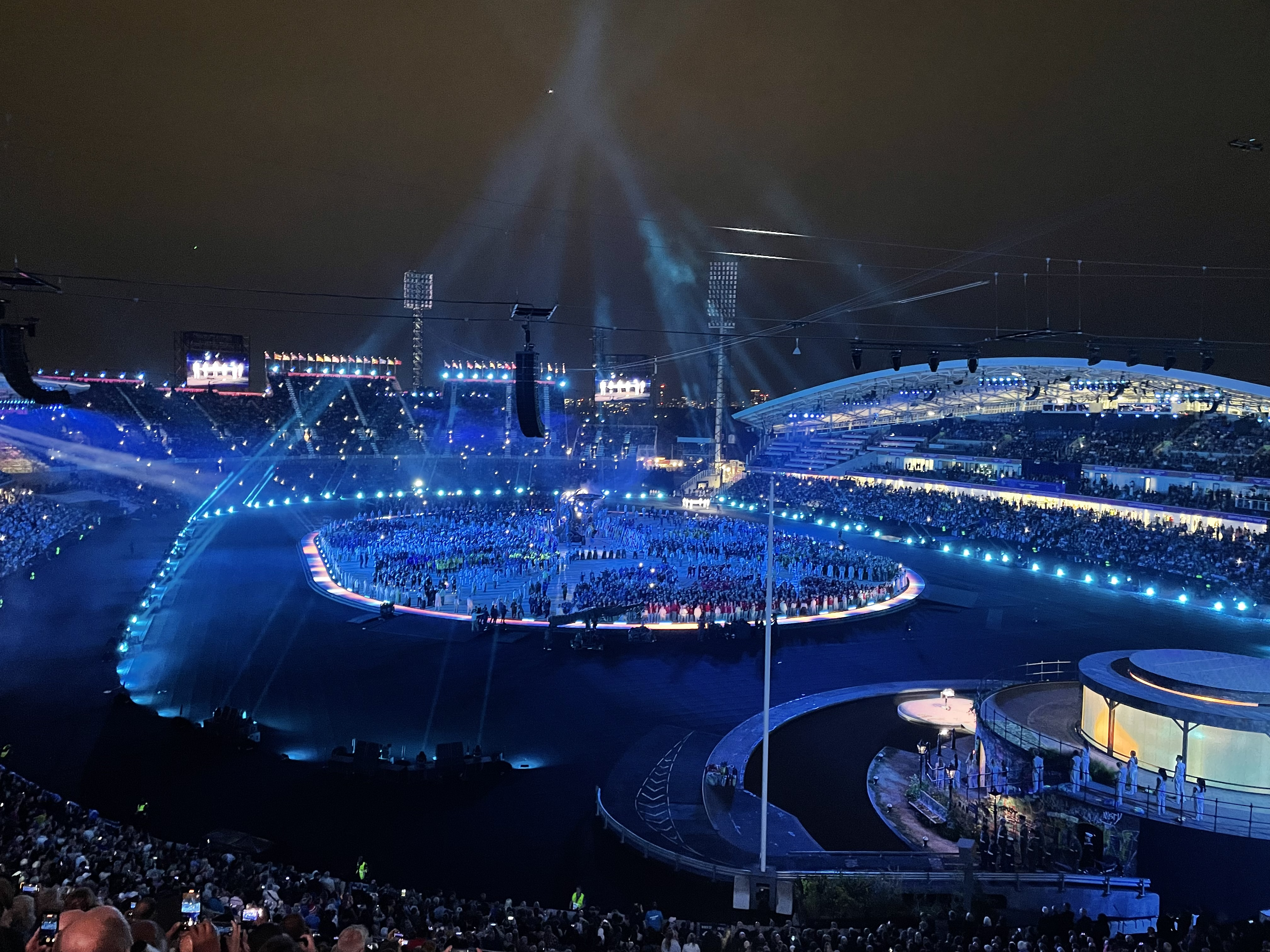
- Date: 28 July 2022
- Time: 20:00 – 22:32 BST
- Location: Birmingham, England; 52.53033°N 1.90561°W
- Filmed by: Sunset+Vine

The opening ceremony for the 2022 Commonwealth Games took place on the evening of Thursday 28 July in the Alexander Stadium, Birmingham. As mandated by the Commonwealth Games Charter, the proceedings of the ceremony combined the formal opening of the sporting event (including hoisting of the flags, parade of the athletes and welcome speeches) with an artistic performance to showcase the host nation's culture. The 2022 Games were formally opened by Charles, Prince of Wales. The centrepiece of the ceremony was an eight-meter-tall animatronic bull, created by the London-based special effects company Artem. The bull, nicknamed 'Ozzy' after Birmingham-born rockstar Ozzy Osbourne is now on permanent display inside Birmingham New Street train station.

== Preparations ==
On 25 August 2021, the Birmingham Organising Committee for the 2022 Commonwealth Games (BOCCG) announced that Birmingham Ceremonies Ltd, a joint venture formed by GBA (Gary Beestone Associates) and Done+Dusted, will produce and deliver the opening and closing ceremonies. The creative team consisted of artistic director Iqbal Khan, writer Maeve Clarke, music director Joshua ‘RTKal’ Holness, production designer Misty Buckley, broadcast director Hamish Hamilton and executive producer Steven Knight. The team was assembled by BOCCG chief creative officer Martin Green, who stated that the creative team was drawn from talents from across the UK in a diverse range of disciplines, from theatre to literature and TV to stage production. Corey Baker was the choreographer and movement director of the opening ceremony responsible for the many physical scenes.

== Proceedings ==
=== Call to Gather ===
The ceremony began with the introductory performance titled "Call to Gather", featuring main character Stella – a "dreamer", played by Lorell Boyce. She and 71 other performers carry shards of light, described as the fragments of the star that fall across the Commonwealth nations, which represent hopes and dreams. A combination of video footage and CGI imagery showed that as the athletes pack their shards of light into the bag, their houses floated into the sky and gather above the stadium, forming the "courtyard of the Commonwealth".

=== Welcome of dignitaries ===
After the video dedicated to the Queen Elizabeth II's life was shown, a trumpet fanfare was delivered by the Royal Marines. A convoy of 72 red, white and blue cars that had direct links to the car manufacturing heritage of Birmingham entered the stadium, forming the Union Jack – the flag of the United Kingdom. Prince Charles (now King Charles III) later arrived at the stadium driving his Aston Martin DB6, accompanied by his wife Camilla (now Queen Camilla).

Birmingham Conservatoire graduate and mezzo-soprano Samantha Oxborough performed the National Anthem – God Save the Queen, joined by community choirs from across the region, with music by the City of Birmingham Symphony Orchestra led by conductor Alpesh Chauhan. The performance of the national anthem was followed by a flypast from eight aircraft of the Red Arrows led by squadron leader Tom Bould, leaving smoke trails in the colours of the National Flag – Red, White and Blue.

=== Everything to Everybody ===
After the video footage of the Queen's Baton Relay, the creative segments continue where the introductory performance ended. The first segment was titled Everything to Everybody, telling about the history of Birmingham. Stella was seen coming out of her home on the stage, while the performers exit the cars at the stage centre, carrying with them their bags and shards of light from earlier. At the stage centre, they are surrounded by featured parkour artists, stunt cyclists and giant puppets that represented literary figures, scientists and musicians from Birmingham's history: Edward Elgar, the Lunar Men, Samuel Johnson and William Shakespeare. Charlie Chaplin accidentally sets fire to the city's first free public library, a reference to the destruction of the first Shakespeare Memorial Room in 1879. But with the shards of light crystals in hand, Stella and the performers put the fire out.

=== Hear My Voice ===
The second segment Hear My Voice recognised the arrival of newcomers to Birmingham and unsung heroes of the COVID-19 pandemic. Pakistani female education activist and the 2014 Nobel Peace Prize laureate Malala Yousafzai gave her speech, expressing hope for free children education, equal rights for women and a peaceful future. An animation about her life was displayed before she walked onto the stage. Dancers from Birmingham Royal Ballet, the Elmhurst Ballet School, 50 professional contemporary dancers and the Critical Mass project all choreographed by Corey Baker, Guitarist Tony Iommi, saxophonist Soweto Kinch and Birmingham-born R&B vocalists Indigo Marshall and Gambimi performed the segment.
