= 2022 Commonwealth Esports Championships =

- Host city: Birmingham, England
- Nations: 12
- Athletes: ~100
- Events: 6 in 3 games
- Opening: 6 August
- Closing: 7 August
- Main venue: ICC Birmingham

The 2022 Commonwealth Esports Championships were the 1st edition of the Commonwealth Esports Championships, an international esports competition for gamers from the member countries of the Commonwealth of Nations held concurrently with the 2022 Commonwealth Games. Over 100 gamers from 12 nations competed in six events across three games held on 6 and 7 August 2022 at the ICC Birmingham. The preliminary rounds, involving 29 nations, were held in Nottingham between 1 and 5 August 2022.

== Competitions ==
The following competitions took place:

2022 Commonwealth Esports Championships programme
- Dota 2
- eFootball
- Rocket League

== Medals table ==
2022 Commonwealth Esports Championship
Rank	Nation	Gold	Silver	Bronze	Total
1	Malaysia (MAS)	3	0	0	3
2	England (ENG)	1	3	1	5
3	Wales (WAL)	1	1	1	3
4	Northern Ireland (NIR)	1	0	0	1
5	Scotland (SCO)	0	2	0	2
6	Australia (AUS)	0	0	2	2
7	India (IND)	0	0	1	1
7	Singapore (SIN)	0	0	1	1
Totals (8 entries)		6	6	6	18

== Medalists ==
=== Dota 2 ===
Event	Gold	Silver	Bronze
Open			
Women			

=== eFootball ===
Event	Gold	Silver	Bronze
Open			
Women			

=== Rocket League ===
Event	Gold	Silver	Bronze
Open			
Women			
