= Para powerlifting at the 2022 Commonwealth Games – Men's heavyweight =

Para powerlifting – Men's heavyweight at the 2022 Commonwealth Games
- Venue: National Exhibition Centre
- Dates: 4 August
- Competitors: 9 from 8 nations
- Winning points: 133.6

Medalists
gold medal	Ikechukwu Obichukwu	Nigeria
silver medal	Micky Yule	Scotland
bronze medal	Ben Wright	Australia

The Men's heavyweight powerlifting event at the 2022 Commonwealth Games took place at the National Exhibition Centre on 4 August 2022.

Ikechukwu Obichukwu won gold for Nigeria after original champion Sudhir had the title removed for failing a doping test.

Scotland's Micky Yule was upgraded to silver and Australia's Ben Wright was moved up from fourth-place to bronze, with a new Oceania record.

== Schedule ==
All times are British Summer Time (UTC+1)

Date	Time	Round
Saturday 4 August 2022	21:00	Final

== Result ==
Rank	Athlete	Body weight (kg)	#1	#2	#3	Result
1st place, gold medalist(s)	Ikechukwu Obichukwu (NGR)	74.90	190	197	~~203~~	133.6 GR
2nd place, silver medalist(s)	Micky Yule (SCO)	74.10	190	192	~~197~~	130.9
3rd place, bronze medalist(s)	Ben Wright (AUS)	89.90	177	185	190	119.1
4	Liam McGarry (ENG)	139.80	205	210	215	116.4
5	Denis Mbaziira (UGA)	85.80	~~160~~	~~160~~	162	103.5
6	Modou Gamo (GAM)	106.50	150	155	~~160~~	91.3
7	Oscar Moussima (CMR)	79.30	90	~~100~~	~~101~~	59.5
DQ	Sudhir Lath (IND)	87.30	208	212	~~217~~	~~134.5 GR~~
	Abdulazeez Ibrahim (NGR)	92.50	~~190~~	~~190~~	―	NM
	Jong Yee Khie (MAS)	-	—N/a			DNS
