= Sachin Chaudhary =

Indian Paralympic powerlifter

Sachin Chaudhary (born 30 September 1983) is an Indian powerlifter. Chaudhary represented India at the 2012 Summer Paralympics in London, United Kingdom, and finished 9th in the men's -82.50 kg event. He took the silver medal at the 2017 Powerlifting World Cup in Dubai with a career-best lift of 200 kg. He competed at the 2018 Commonwealth Games where he won a bronze medal in the heavyweight event.
