= Sudhir (powerlifter) =

Indian Para powerlifter

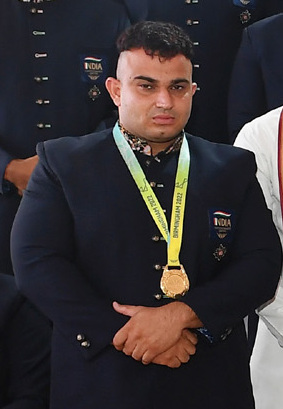

Personal information
- Born: 27 October 1994 (age 31) Sonipat, Haryana, India
- Height: 1.67 m (5 ft 6 in)
- Weight: 86 kg (190 lb)

Sport
- Sport: Para Powerlifting
- Event: Men's Heavyweight
Medal record
Men's Para Powerlifting
Representing India
Asian Para Games
Bronze medal – third place	2018 Jakarta	Up to 80 kg

Sudhir (born 27 October 1994) is an Indian Para powerlifter. He is a six-time Indian national champion in para powerlifting and was also a bronze medalist at the 2018 Asian Para Games.

Sudhir won the gold medal at the men's heavyweight in the 2022 Commonwealth Games. However, he was later disqualified and stripped of his medal, following doping violations.
