= Ikechukwu Obichukwu =

Nigerian Paralympic powerlifter

Personal information
- Full name: Ikechukwu Christian Obichukwu
- Born: 3 February 1993 (age 33) Nigeria

Sport
- Country: Nigeria
- Sport: Paralympic powerlifting
Medal record
Paralympic Games
Silver medal – second place	2012 London	52 kg
Commonwealth Games
Silver medal – second place	2022 Birmingham	Men's heavyweight
Bronze medal – third place	2010 Delhi	Men's open bench press

Ikechukwu Obichukwu(born 3 February 1993) is a Nigerian Paralympic powerlifter. He represented Nigeria at the 2012 Summer Paralympics held in London, United Kingdom and he won the silver medal in the men's 52 kg event.

He also competed at the Commonwealth Games in 2010, where he won the bronze medal in the men's open bench press event, and in 2022 where he won a silver medal in the men's heavyweight event.
