= Ben Wright (powerlifter) =

Australian Paralympic powerlifter

Personal information
- Nickname: The Hobbit
- Born: 23 April 1987 (age 39) Viveash, Western Australia

Sport
- Sport: Para powerlifting
Medal record
Representing Australia
Commonwealth Games
Bronze medal – third place	2022 Birmingham	Heavyweight

Ben Wright (born 23 April 1987) is an Australian para powerlifter. Wright was successful in securing a spot as Bipartisan invitee to compete at 2024 Summer Paralympics.

== Personal ==
Wright was born on 23 April 1987 at Viveash, Western Australia. He was born with spina bifida. In 2023, he works in Perth as a draftsman.

== Power lifting ==
Growing up he played wheelchair basketball and threw the shot put. In 2012, he took up powerlifting after attending a 2012 a “come-and-try day” where he pressed 80 kg . At the 2014 Commonwealth Games, Glasgow, he finished tenth in the Men's Bench Press Heavyweight with a press of 152.1 kg. At the 2018 Commonwealth Games, Gold Coast, he finished sixth in the Men's Bench Press Heavyweight with a press of 152.4 kg.

Ten weeks outs from the 2022 Commonwealth Games, Wright suffered a seizure that resulted in a broken back in four places. Placing fourth at Birmingham Commonwealth Games 2022, in 2023 he later elevated to the Bronze position following the disqualification of the Indian gold medallist due to an anti-doping violation.

Wright entered the 2024 Paris Paralympics with a personal best set at the Dubai World Championships in 2023 of 191 kg in the Men's Bench Press 88 kg. At the 2024 Paris Paralympics, he finished seventh in the Men's Bench Press 88 kg with a lift of 192 kg which was an Oceania record.
