= Micky Yule =

British Paralympic powerlifter

Michael Yule
- Yule after winning gold at the Invictus Games

Personal information
- Born: 24 December 1978 (age 47) Edinburgh, Scotland

Sport
- Coached by: Tom Whittaker (national); Neil Crosbie (personal)

Achievements and titles
- Paralympic finals: 2016 Rio - 2020 Tokyo
Medal record
Powerlifting
Representing Great Britain
European Championships
Gold medal – first place	2015 Eger	−80 kg
Summer Paralympics
Bronze medal – third place	2020 Tokyo	−72 kg

Michael Yule (born 24 December 1978) is a British Paralympic powerlifter competing in the -80 kg class. In 2021, he won the bronze medal in the men's 72 kg event at the 2020 Summer Paralympics in Tokyo, Japan.

In the 2022 Birmingham Commonwealth Games Micky won Bronze in the Men's Heavyweight category.

== Personal history ==
Yule was born in Edinburgh, Scotland in 1978. He grew up in Wallyford, East Lothian.

Yule joined the British Army at the age of 17 and in 2007 he was working as a diving instructor at the Defence Diving School on Horsea Island, Port Solent, for three years before being posted to Afghanistan. In Afghanistan he was a staff sergeant in the Royal Engineers and was posted to Helmand province. In March 2010, whilst on patrol, Yule stood on an IED.

== Powerlifting career ==
Yule was a member of the Army Powerlifting team before his injury, and took up powerlifting as part of his rehabilitation. In 2012 he attended his first competitive powerlifting games, representing Great Britain at an international event in Cardiff. He then took part in his first major international competition, the European Championships where he finished fourth in the 72 kg category. This was followed by a trip to Dubai to take part in the 2014 IPC Powerlifting World Championships, finishing fourth in his division. 2014 also saw Yule compete at the Commonwealth Games in Glasgow, competing for Scotland in the Men's +72 kg division. He was then selected for the 2018 Gold Coast Commonwealth Games. He finished fourth in both Games.

In the build-up to the 2016 Paralympic Games in Rio, Yule started to find competition success. At the 2015 European Championships in Eger, he took the gold medal in the men's 80 kg category. He followed this with another gold, this time at the 2016 Invictus Games, lifting a personal best of 190 kg to dominate the competition. His results saw him named as part of the Great Britain team that would compete in Rio that Summer. He is now multiple weight British Champion and 2 time European Champion.
