= Fiji at the 2022 Commonwealth Games =

- Flag of Fiji
- CG code: FIJ
- CGA: Fiji Association of Sports and National Olympic Committee
- Website: www.fasanoc.org.fj

in Birmingham, England 28 July 2022 – 8 August 2022
- Competitors: 64 (36 men and 28 women) in 10 sports
- Flag bearers: Semesa Naiseruvati; Naibili Vatunisolo
- Medals Ranked 29th: Gold 0 Silver 2 Bronze 2 Total 4

Commonwealth Games appearances (overview)
- 1938; 1950; 1954; 1958; 1962; 1966; 1970; 1974; 1978; 1982; 1986; 1990–1994; 1998; 2002; 2006; 2010; 2014; 2018; 2022; 2026; 2030

Fiji competed at the 2022 Commonwealth Games in Birmingham, England between 28 July and 8 August 2022. It was Fiji's seventeenth appearance at the Games.

Semesa Naiseruvati and Naibili Vatunisolo were the country's flagbearers during the opening ceremony.

== Medalists ==
Medal	Name	Sport	Event	Date
Silver	Fiji national rugby sevens team: Elia Canakaivata; Josua Vakurunabili; Tevita Daugunu; Sevuloni Mocenacagi; Jerry Matana; Semi Kunatani; Jerry Tuwai; Waisea Nacuqu; Filipe Sauturaga; Kaminieli Rasaku; Sireli Maqala; Aminiasi Tuimaba; Vuiviawa Naduvalo	Rugby sevens	Men's tournament	31 July
Silver	Fiji women's national rugby sevens team: Rusila Nagasau; Raijieli Daveua; Vani Buleki; Vasiti Solikoviti; Verenaisi Ditavutu; Ivamere Rokowati; Lavena Cavuru; Viniana Riwai; Reapi Uluinisau; Lavenia Tinai; Ana Naimasi; Sesenieli Donu; Laisana Moceisawana	Rugby sevens	Women's tournament	31 July
Bronze	Taniela Rainibogi	Weightlifting	Men's 96 kg	2 August
Bronze	Naibili Vatunisolo	Athletics	Women's discus throw F44/64	4 August

== Competitors ==
It is expected that Fiji will send a contingent of 70 to the Games. This was later revised to 64.

The following is the list of number of competitors participating at the Games per sport/discipline.

Sport	Men	Women	Total
Athletics	2	1	3
Boxing	2	0	2
Judo	2	1	3
Lawn bowls	5	5	10
Rugby sevens	13	13	26
Squash	1	0	1
Swimming	5	3	8
Table tennis	3	4	7
Triathlon	2	0	2
Weightlifting	1	1	2
Total	36	28	64

== Athletics ==
As of 17 June 2022, three athletes (including one para athlete) will take part in the competition.

Men
Track and road events

Athlete	Event	Heat		Semifinal		Final	
Athlete	Event	Result	Rank	Result	Rank	Result	Rank
Banuve Tabakaucoro	100 m	10.64	5	Did not advance			
Yeshnil Karan	1500 m	4:04.22	11	—N/a		Did not advance	
Yeshnil Karan	5000 m	—N/a				DNF	

Women
Field events

Athlete	Event	Final	
Athlete	Event	Distance	Rank
Naibili Vatunisolo	Discus throw F44/64	23.70	3rd place, bronze medalist(s)

== Boxing ==
Two boxers were selected.

Men

Athlete	Event	Round of 32	Round of 16	Quarterfinals	Semifinals	Final	
Athlete	Event	Opposition Result	Opposition Result	Opposition Result	Opposition Result	Opposition Result	Rank
Jone Davule	Featherweight	Chemben (MRI); W 3 - 2	Ndevelo (NAM); L RSC	Did not advance			
Elia Rokobuli	Light welterweight	Chakma (BAN); W WO	Omar (GHA); L RSC	Did not advance			

== Judo ==
As of 17 June 2022, three judoka will take part in the competition.

Athlete	Event	Round of 16	Quarterfinals	Semifinals	Repechage	Final/BM	
Athlete	Event	Opposition Result	Opposition Result	Opposition Result	Opposition Result	Opposition Result	Rank
Tevita Takayawa	Men's -100 kg	Adonis (MRI); W 10 - 00	El Nahas (CAN); L 00 - 10	Did not advance	Deswal (IND); W 10 - 00	Thompson (ENG); L 00 - 10	5
Gerard Takayawa	Men's +100 kg	Antoniou (CYP); L 00 - 10	Did not advance				9
Shanice Takayawa	Women's -70 kg	—N/a	Y-Brown (ENG); L 00 - 10	Did not advance	Asonye (NGR); L 00 - 10	Did not advance	7

== Lawn bowls ==
A squad of ten bowlers (five per gender) was officially selected on 1 March 2022. Elizabeth Moceiwai was later replaced by Radhika Prasad.

Men

Athlete	Event	Group stage					Quarterfinal	Semifinal	Final / BM	
Athlete	Event	Opposition Score	Opposition Score	Opposition Score	Opposition Score	Rank	Opposition Score	Opposition Score	Opposition Score	Rank
Semesa Naiseruvati	Singles	Abd Muin (MAS); L 14―21	Olivier (NAM); L 15―21	Walker (ENG); L 11―21	Simpson (JAM); W 21―4	4	Did not advance			
Kushal Pillay; Rajnesh Prasad	Pairs	South Africa; L 14–18	Australia; W 27–16	Guernsey; W 25–14	—N/a	2 Q	Scotland; L 7–20	Did not advance		
Martin Fong; David Aitcheson; Semesa Naiseruvati	Triples	Wales; W 13–12	Norfolk Island; W 20–12	Northern Ireland; W 20–15	—N/a	1 Q	Malta; W 15–14	Australia; L 13–26	Wales; L 7–21	4
Martin Fong; Kushal Pillay; Rajnesh Prasad; David Aitcheson	Fours	India; L 11―14	England; L 8―23	Cook Islands; L 10―15	—N/a	4	Did not advance			

Women

Athlete	Event	Group stage					Quarterfinal	Semifinal	Final / BM	
Athlete	Event	Opposition Score	Opposition Score	Opposition Score	Opposition Score	Rank	Opposition Score	Opposition Score	Opposition Score	Rank
Litia Tikoisuva	Singles	Wilson (NFK); L 16–21	Piketh (RSA); W 21–13	Mataio (COK); L 6–21	—N/a	4	Did not advance			
Losalini Tukai; Litia Tikoisuva	Pairs	Scotland; L 13―16	England; L 13―19	Northern Ireland; W 17―16	—N/a	3	Did not advance			
Radhika Prasad; Loreta Kotoisuva; Sheral Mar	Triples	Malaysia; W 17 - 14	Canada; W 19 - 10	Norfolk Island; L 13 - 16	—N/a	1 Q	Cook Islands; L 12 - 23	Did not advance		
Radhika Prasad; Losalini Tukai; Loreta Kotoisuva; Sheral Mar	Fours	Scotland; W 13–12	Australia; L 10–16	Botswana; W 17–16	—N/a	1 Q	Northern Ireland; W 15–12	South Africa; L 14–16	New Zealand; L 6–17	4

== Rugby sevens ==
As of 9 March 2022, Fiji qualified for both the men's and women's tournaments. The men achieved qualification through their positions in the 2018–19 / 2019–20 World Rugby Sevens Series, whereas the women achieved qualification via the 2019 Oceania Women's Sevens Championship (owing to the cancellation of an Oceania qualifier that was scheduled for April 2022).

Both squads were confirmed on 6 July 2022, including several members of the squad that won the Tokyo 2020 men's tournament.

Summary

Team	Event	Preliminary Round				Quarterfinal / CQ	Semifinal / CS	Final / BM / CF	
Team	Event	Opposition Result	Opposition Result	Opposition Result	Rank	Opposition Result	Opposition Result	Opposition Result	Rank
Fiji men's	Men's tournament	Zambia; W 52 - 0	Canada; W 19 - 12	Wales; W 38 - 24	1 Q	Scotland; W 34 - 7	New Zealand; W 19 - 14 (a.e.t.)	South Africa; L 7 - 31	2nd place, silver medalist(s)
Fiji women's	Women's tournament	Scotland; W 31 - 12	South Africa; W 41 - 0	Australia; W 19 - 12	1 Q	—N/a	Canada; W 24 - 7	Australia; L 12 - 22	2nd place, silver medalist(s)

=== Men's tournament ===
Roster

- Elia Canakaivata
- Josua Vakurunabili
- Tevita Daugunu
- Sevuloni Mocenacagi
- Jerry Matana
- Semi Kunatani
- Jerry Tuwai
- Waisea Nacuqu
- Filipe Sauturaga
- Kaminieli Rasaku
- Sireli Maqala
- Aminiasi Tuimaba
- Vuiviawa Naduvalo

Pool C

Pos	Team	Pld	W	D	L	PF	PA	PD	Pts	Qualification
1	Fiji	3	3	0	0	109	36	+73	9	Advance to Quarter-finals
2	Canada	3	2	0	1	67	31	+36	7	Advance to Quarter-finals
3	Wales	3	1	0	2	62	74	−12	5	Advance to classification Quarter-finals
4	Zambia	3	0	0	3	17	114	−97	3	Advance to classification Quarter-finals

Source: Birmingham2022
Rules for classification: 1) Points; 2) Head-to-head result; 3) Point difference; 4) Points scored.

29 July 2022
13:02

Fiji	52–0	Zambia
Try: Mocenacagi 2' c Nacuqu 3' c Mocenacagi 5' m Canakaivata 7' c Tuimaba 8' c Naduvalo (2) 11' m, 14' c Kunatani 13' c Con: Nacuqu (4/4) 2', 4', 7', 8'; Rasaku (0/1); Sauturaga (2/3) 13', 14'	Report

Coventry Stadium, Coventry
Referee: Morné Ferreira (South Africa)

29 July 2022
21:32

Fiji	19–12	Canada
Try: Mocenacagi 1' c Josua Vakurunabili 3' m Mocenacagi 4' c Con: Nacuqu (2/3) 1', 5'; Cards: Naduvalo (yellow card) 12'	Report	Try: Webster 7' m Penalty try 12'; Con: Coats (0/1)

Coventry Stadium, Coventry
Referee: Ben Breakspear (Wales)

30 July 2022
13:02

Fiji	38–24	Wales
Try: Sauturaga (2) 1' c, 8' m Naduvalo (2) 3' c, 5' m Nacuqu 6' c Rasaku 12' c Con: Sauturaga (1/1) 1'; Nacuqu (2/4) 3', 7'; Rasaku (1/1) 13'	Report	Try: T. Williams 2' c Lewis (2) 10' c, 11' c M. Williams 14' m Con: T. Williams (3/3) 2', 10', 12'; Jenkins (0/1)

Coventry Stadium, Coventry
Referee: Adam Leal (England)

Quarterfinals

30 July 2022
20:26

Fiji	34–7	Scotland
Try: Nacuqu (2) 2' m, 8' c Rasaku 5' c Mocenacagi 7' m Matana 10' m Maqala 12' m Con: Nacuqu (1/3) 8'; Rasaku (1/2) 5'; Sauturaga (0/1)	Report	Try: Edmunds 14' c Con: Davidson (1/1) 14'

Coventry Stadium, Coventry
Referee: Ben Breakspear (Wales)

Semifinals

31 July 2022
12:42

New Zealand	14–19 (a.e.t.)	Fiji
Try: Ware 5' c Con: McGarvey-Black (1/1) 6'; Cards: Rokolisoa (yellow card) 14'; Carter (yellow card) 14'	Report	Try: Sauturaga 7' c Mocenacagi 10' c Nacuqu 15'; Con: Nacuqu (2/2) 7', 10'; Cards: Rasaku (yellow card) 3'

Coventry Stadium, Coventry
Referee: Jordan Way (Australia)

Finals

31 July 2022
21:04

Fiji	7–31	South Africa
Try: Nacuqu 10' c Con: Nacuqu (1/1) 11'	Report	Try: du Plessis (2) 2' c, 8' c Pretorius 4' m Williams 6' m, Ndhlovu 13' c Con: Williams (2/3) 2', 8'; S. Davids (0/1); Human (1/1) 14'

Coventry Stadium, Coventry
Referee: Adam Leal (England)

=== Women's tournament ===
Roster

- Rusila Nagasau (c)
- Raijieli Daveua
- Vani Buleki
- Vasiti Solikoviti
- Verenaisi Ditavutu
- Ivamere Rokowati
- Lavena Cavuru
- Viniana Riwai
- Reapi Uluinisau
- Lavenia Tinai
- Ana Naimasi
- Sesenieli Donu
- Laisana Moceisawana

Pool B

Pos	Team	Pld	W	D	L	PF	PA	PD	Pts	Qualification
1	Fiji	3	3	0	0	91	24	+67	9	Semi-finals
2	Australia	3	2	0	1	100	19	+81	7	Semi-finals
3	Scotland	3	1	0	2	45	93	−48	5	Classification semi-finals
4	South Africa	3	0	0	3	12	112	−100	3	Classification semi-finals

Updated to match(es) played on 29 July 2022. Source: Birmingham2022
Rules for classification: 1) Points; 2) Head-to-head result; 3) Point difference; 4) Points scored.

29 July 2022
09:22

Fiji	31–12	Scotland
Try: Uluinisau 3' c Buleki 7' c Cavuru 8' c Donu 12' m Riwai 14' m Con: Cavuru (2/2) 3', 8'; Naimasi (1/2) 9'; Uluinisau (0/1)	Report	Try: Campbell 5' m Lloyd 10' c Con: Thomson (0/1); Nelson (1/1) 11'

Coventry Stadium, Coventry
Referee: Ashleigh Murray-Pretorius (South Africa)

29 July 2022
17:30

Fiji	41–0	South Africa
Try: Uluinisau (2) 2' c, 11' c Buleki 3' m Naimasi 6' c Donu (2) 8' m, 9' m Cavuru 13' m Con: Naimasi (2/4) 2', 7'; Riwai (0/1); Uluinisau (1/1) 11'; Cavuru (0/1)	Report

Coventry Stadium, Coventry
Referee: Tyler Miller (Australia)

30 July 2022
09:22

Australia	12–19	Fiji
Try: Levi 12' m Hayes 13' c Con: Williams (0/1); Southwell (1/1) 14'	Report	Try: Nagasau 1' m Donu 3' c Daveua 9' c Con: Naimasi (0/1); Riwai (2/2) 4', 9'; Cards: Uluinisau (yellow card) 13'

Coventry Stadium, Coventry
Referee: Lauren Jenner (New Zealand)

Semifinals

30 July 2022
20:04

Fiji	24–7	Canada
Try: Buleki 1' c Uluinisau (2) 2' m, 12' c Riwai 3' m Con: Uluinisau (1/1) 1'; Naimasi (0/2); Cavuru (1/1) 12'	Report	Try: Nicholas 7' c Con: Apps (1/1) 7'

Coventry Stadium, Coventry
Referee: Lauren Jenner (New Zealand)

Finals

31 July 2022
20:38

Australia	22–12	Fiji
Try: Nathan (2) 1' m, 3' m Ashby 6' c Levi 8' m Con: Williams (1/4) 6'; Cards: Caslick (yellow card) 13'	Report	Try: Naimasi 9' c Donu 14' m Con: Naimasi (1/1) 9'; Cavuru (0/1)

Coventry Stadium, Coventry
Referee: Hollie Davidson (Scotland)

== Squash ==
As of 17 June 2022, one player will take part in the competition.

Athlete	Event	Round of 64	Round of 32	Round of 16	Quarterfinals	Semifinals	Final	
Athlete	Event	Opposition Score	Opposition Score	Opposition Score	Opposition Score	Opposition Score	Opposition Score	Rank
Marika Matanatabu	Men's singles	Kelly (CAY); L 2 - 3	Did not advance					

== Swimming ==
As of 17 June 2022, eight swimmers will take part in the competition.

Men

Athlete	Event	Heat		Semifinal		Final	
Athlete	Event	Time	Rank	Time	Rank	Time	Rank
Epeli Rabua	50 m freestyle	24.88	48	Did not advance			
Hansel McCaig	50 m freestyle	23.29	18	Did not advance			
David Young	50 m freestyle	23.62	23	Did not advance			
Epeli Rabua	100 m freestyle	55.83	60	Did not advance			
Hansel McCaig	100 m freestyle	51.78	28	Did not advance			
David Young	100 m freestyle	52.47	31	Did not advance			
Temafa Yalimaiwai	200 m freestyle	2:00.87	34	—N/a		Did not advance	
Taichi Vakasama	50 m breaststroke	Did not start		Did not advance			
Epeli Rabua	50 m breaststroke	29.60	28	Did not advance			
David Young	50 m breaststroke	30.76	32	Did not advance			
Taichi Vakasama	100 m breaststroke	1:03.53	20	Did not advance			
Epeli Rabua	100 m breaststroke	1:05.25	27	Did not advance			
Taichi Vakasama	200 m breaststroke	2:19.24	10	—N/a		Did not advance	
Epeli Rabua	50 m butterfly	26.01	37	Did not advance			
Hansel McCaig	50 m butterfly	25.14	25	Did not advance			
Temafa Yalimaiwai	50 m butterfly	26.04	38	Did not advance			
Temafa Yalimaiwai	100 m butterfly	57.90	37	Did not advance			
Epeli Rabua; Hansel McCaig; Temafa Yalimaiwai; David Young	4×100 m freestyle relay	3:32.18	8 Q	—N/a		3:31.46	8
Epeli Rabua; Hansel McCaig; Temafa Yalimaiwai; David Young	4×100 m medley relay	3:57.43	6 Q	—N/a		3:55.31	6

Women

Athlete	Event	Heat		Semifinal		Final	
Athlete	Event	Time	Rank	Time	Rank	Time	Rank
Cheyenne Rova	50 m freestyle	28.03	41	Did not advance			
Rosemarie Rova	50 m freestyle	28.08	42	Did not advance			
Cheyenne Rova	100 m freestyle	1:01.81	44	Did not advance			
Rosemarie Rova	100 m freestyle	1:00.78	36	Did not advance			
Cheyenne Rova	50 m backstroke	32.34	25	Did not advance			
Kelera Mudunasoko	50 m breaststroke	34.14	21	Did not advance			
Kelera Mudunasoko	100 m breaststroke	1:16.23	22	Did not advance			
Kelera Mudunasoko	200 m breaststroke	2:53.40	14	—N/a		Did not advance	
Rosemarie Rova	50 m butterfly	29.90	35	Did not advance			
Rosemarie Rova	100 m butterfly	1:08.95	32	Did not advance			

Mixed

Athlete	Event	Heat		Final	
Athlete	Event	Time	Rank	Time	Rank
Hansel McCaig; David Young; Cheyenne Rova; Rosemarie Rova	4×100 m freestyle relay	3:49.95	12	Did not advance	
	4×100 m medley relay	Did not start		Did not advance	

== Table tennis ==
Fiji qualified both a men's and a women's team for the table tennis competitions. The selections for both teams and addition of a parasport player were confirmed as of 17 June 2022.

Singles

Athletes	Event	Group stage				Round of 32	Round of 16	Quarterfinal	Semifinal	Final / BM	
Athletes	Event	Opposition Score	Opposition Score	Opposition Score	Rank	Opposition Score	Opposition Score	Opposition Score	Opposition Score	Opposition Score	Rank
Vicky Wu	Men's singles	Nuopula (SOL); W 4 - 0	Dalgleish (SCO); L 0 - 4	Commey (GHA); L 0 - 4	3	Did not advance					
Stephen Reilly	Men's singles	Nathoo (RSA); L 0 - 4	Farley (BAR); L 0 - 4	—N/a	3	Did not advance					
Jai Chauhan	Men's singles	Choong (MAS); L 0 - 4	Asante (GHA); L 0 - 4	—N/a	3	Did not advance					
Grace Yee	Women's singles	Mawa (VAN); W 4 - 1	Elliott (SCO); L 1 - 4	Ho (MAS); L 1 - 4	3	Did not advance					
Carolyn Li	Women's singles	Qwea (VAN); W 4 - 2	Nimal (MDV); W 4 - 2	Fu (CAN); L 1 - 4	2	Did not advance					
Touea Titana	Women's singles	Agari (PNG); W 4 - 3	Edghill (GUY); L 0 - 4	—N/a	2	Did not advance					
Akanisi Latu	Women's singles C3–5	Ikpeoyi (NGR); L 0 - 3	di Toro (AUS); L 0 - 3	Patel (IND); L 0 - 3	4	—N/a			Did not advance		

Doubles

Athletes	Event	Round of 64	Round of 32	Round of 16	Quarterfinal	Semifinal	Final / BM	
Athletes	Event	Opposition Score	Opposition Score	Opposition Score	Opposition Score	Opposition Score	Opposition Score	Rank
Vicky Wu; Jai Chauhan	Men's doubles	Bye	Bawm / Ridoy (BAN); L 0 - 3	Did not advance				
Grace Yee; Carolyn Li	Women's doubles	Edghill / Cummings (GUY); L 1 - 3	Did not advance					
Jai Chauhan; Carolyn Li	Mixed doubles	Franklin / Cummings (GUY); L 0 - 3	Did not advance					
Vicky Wu; Grace Yee	Mixed doubles	Mutua / Amadi (KEN); W 3 - 1	Chew / Zeng (SGP); L 0 - 3	Did not advance				
Stephen Reilly; Touea Titana	Mixed doubles	Crea / Sinon (SEY); L 2 - 3	Did not advance					

Team

Athletes	Event	Group stage				Quarterfinal	Semifinal	Final	Rank
Athletes	Event	Opposition Score	Opposition Score	Opposition Score	Rank	Opposition Score	Opposition Score	Opposition Score	Rank
Vicky Wu; Stephen Reilly; Jai Chauhan	Men's team	Bangladesh; L 0 - 3	England; L 0 - 3	Guyana; L 0 - 3	4	Did not advance			
Grace Yee; Carolyn Li; Touea Titana	Women's team	Guyana; L 0 - 3	India; L 0 - 3	South Africa; L 0 - 3	4	Did not advance			

== Triathlon ==
As of 17 June 2022, two triathletes will take part in the competition.

Individual

Athlete	Event	Swim (750 m)	Trans 1	Bike (20 km)	Trans 2	Run (5 km)	Total	Rank
Rhys Cheer	Men's	9:56	1:13	33:36	0:24	26:41	1:11:50	41
Nikotimasi Croker	Men's	11:06	1:13	36:04	0:30	22:17	1:11:10	40

== Weightlifting ==
Two weightlifters were selected. Helen Seipua qualified via the IWF Commonwealth Ranking List, whereas Taniela Rainibogi was awarded a Bipartite Invitation.

Athlete	Event	Weight lifted		Total	Rank
Athlete	Event	Snatch	Clean & jerk	Total	Rank
Taniela Rainibogi	Men's 96 kg	155	188	343	3rd place, bronze medalist(s)
Helen Seipua	Women's +87 kg	85	108	193	9
