= Fiji at the 2018 Commonwealth Games =

- Flag of Fiji
- CG code: FIJ
- CGA: Fiji Association of Sports and National Olympic Committee
- Website: www.fijiolympiccommittee.com

in Gold Coast, Australia 4 April 2018 – 15 April 2018
- Competitors: 96 in 12 sports
- Flag bearer: Apolonia Vaivai
- Medals Ranked 23rd: Gold 1 Silver 1 Bronze 2 Total 4

Commonwealth Games appearances (overview)
- 1938; 1950; 1954; 1958; 1962; 1966; 1970; 1974; 1978; 1982; 1986; 1990–1994; 1998; 2002; 2006; 2010; 2014; 2018; 2022; 2026; 2030

Fiji competed at the 2018 Commonwealth Games in the Gold Coast, Australia from April 4 to April 15, 2018. It was Fiji's 16th appearance at the Commonwealth Games.

Fiji competed in 12 sports and made their first appearance in the Men’s rugby sevens tournament after a twelve year absence. Fiji announced a team of 97 athletes. Though only 96 competed.

Weightlifter Apolonia Vaivai was the country's flag bearer during the opening ceremony.

== Medalists ==
| Medal | Name | Sport | Event | Date |
|---|---|---|---|---|
| Gold | Eileen Cikamatana | Weightlifting | Women's −90 kg | April 9 |
| Silver | Fiji national rugby sevens team: Paula Dranisinukula; Mesulame Kunavula; Sevuloni Mocenecagi; Alasio Naduva; Amenoni Nasilasila; Kalione Nasoko; Vatemo Ravouvou; Eroni Sau; Jerry Tuwai; Ratu Vakurinabili; Jasa Veremalua; Sammi Viriviri | Rugby sevens | Men's tournament | April 15 |
| Bronze | Apolonia Vaivai | Weightlifting | Women's −69 kg | April 8 |
| Bronze | Winston Hill | Boxing | Men's −69 kg | April 14 |

== Competitors ==
The following is the list of number of competitors participating at the Games per sport/discipline.

| Sport | Men | Women | Total |
|---|---|---|---|
| Athletics | 8 | 4 | 12 |
| Badminton | 2 | 4 | 6 |
| Beach volleyball | 2 | 2 | 4 |
| Boxing | 2 | 0 | 2 |
| Lawn bowls | 5 | 5 | 10 |
| Netball | —N/a | 12 | 12 |
| Rugby sevens | 13 | 12 | 25 |
| Shooting | 4 | 0 | 4 |
| Squash | 3 | 1 | 4 |
| Swimming | 3 | 2 | 5 |
| Table tennis | 2 | 3 | 5 |
| Weightlifting | 3 | 4 | 7 |
| Total | 46 | 48 | 96 |

== Athletics ==
Fiji participated with 12 athletes (8 men and 4 women).

Men
Track & road events

| Athlete | Event | Heat | | Semifinal | | Final | |
| Athlete | Event | Result | Rank | Result | Rank | Result | Rank |
|---|---|---|---|---|---|---|---|
| Aaron Powell | 100 m | 11.03 | 6 | Did not advance | | | |
| Kolinio Radrudru | 100 m | 11.22 | 6 | Did not advance | | | |
| Aaron Powell | 200 m | 22.05 | 7 | Did not advance | | | |
| Samuela Railoa | 400 m | 48.11 | 5 | Did not advance | | | |
| Kameli Sauduadua | 400 m | 47.91 | 5 | Did not advance | | | |
| Petero Veitaqomaki | 800 m | 1:54.22 | 8 | —N/a | | Did not advance | |
| Aaron Powell; Samuela Railoa; Petero Veitaqomaki; Eugene Vollmer | 4 × 100 m relay | 42.09 | 6 | —N/a | | Did not advance | |
| Aaron Powell; Samuela Railoa; Kameli Sauduadua; Petero Veitaqomaki | 4 × 400 m relay | 3:19.19 | 3 Q | —N/a | | 3:15.10 | 5 |

Field events

| Athlete | Event | Qualification | | Final | |
| Athlete | Event | Distance | Rank | Distance | Rank |
|---|---|---|---|---|---|
| Eugene Vollmer | Long jump | 6.85 | 25 | Did not advance | |
| Eugene Vollmer | Triple jump | 15.32 | 16 | Did not advance | |
| Malakai Kaiwalu | High jump | NM | | Did not advance | |
| Mustafa Fall | Shot put | 15.72 | 14 | Did not advance | |
| Mustafa Fall | Discus throw | 39.68 | 12 q | 43.50 | 12 |

Women
Track & road events

| Athlete | Event | Heat | | Semifinal | | Final | |
| Athlete | Event | Result | Rank | Result | Rank | Result | Rank |
|---|---|---|---|---|---|---|---|
| Makereta Naulu | 100 m | 12.23 | 7 | Did not advance | | | |
| Miriama Senokonoko | 400 m | 58.31 | 8 | Did not advance | | | |
| Elenani Tinai | 400 m | 57.45 | 6 | Did not advance | | | |

Field events

| Athlete | Event | Final | |
| Athlete | Event | Distance | Rank |
|---|---|---|---|
| Shawntell Lockington | High jump | NM | |

== Badminton ==
Fiji participated with six athletes (2 men and 4 women).

Singles

| Athlete | Event | Round of 64 | Round of 32 | Round of 16 | Quarterfinal | Semifinal | Final / BM | |
| Athlete | Event | Opposition Score | Opposition Score | Opposition Score | Opposition Score | Opposition Score | Opposition Score | Rank |
|---|---|---|---|---|---|---|---|---|
| Burty Molia | Men's singles | Prakash Vijayanath (RSA); L 0-2 | Did not advance | | | | | |
| Liam Fong | Men's singles | BYE | Niluka Karunaratne (SRI); L 0-2 | Did not advance | | | | |
| Alissa Dean | Women's singles | Mahoor Shahzad (PAK); L 0-2 | Did not advance | | | | | |
| Andra Whiteside | Women's singles | BYE | P. V. Sindhu (IND); L 0-2 | Did not advance | | | | |
| Karyn Gibson | Women's singles | Yeo Jia Min (SGP); L 0-2 | Did not advance | | | | | |

Doubles

| Athlete | Event | Round of 64 | Round of 32 | Round of 16 | Quarterfinal | Semifinal | Final / BM | |
| Athlete | Event | Opposition Score | Opposition Score | Opposition Score | Opposition Score | Opposition Score | Opposition Score | Rank |
|---|---|---|---|---|---|---|---|---|
| Burty Molia; Liam Fong | Men's doubles | —N/a | Danny Bawa Chrisnanta (SGP); Terry Hee Yong Kai (SGP); L 0-2 | Did not advance | | | | |
| Karyn Gibson; Andra Whiteside | Women's doubles | —N/a | Rachel Honderich (CAN); Kristen Tsai (CAN); L 0-2 | Did not advance | | | | |
| Alissa Dean; Danielle Whiteside | Women's doubles | —N/a | Alana Bailey (JAM); Katherine Wynter (JAM); W 2-1 | Setyana Mapasa (AUS); Gronya Somerville (AUS); L 0 - 2 | Did not advance | | | |
| Karyn Gibson; Burty Molia | Mixed doubles | Brian Kasirye (UGA); Aisha Nakiyemba (UGA); W 2-1 | Pranaav Jerry Chopra (IND); N. Sikki Reddy (IND); L 0-2 | Did not advance | | | | |
| Andra Whiteside; Liam Fong | Mixed doubles | Emmanuel Donkor (GHA); Stella Koteikai Amasah (GHA); L 1-2 | Did not advance | | | | | |

== Beach volleyball ==
Fiji qualified a men's and women's beach volleyball team for a total of four athletes.

| Athlete | Event | Preliminary round | Standing | Quarterfinals | Semifinals | Final / BM | |
| Athlete | Event | Opposition Score | Standing | Opposition Score | Opposition Score | Opposition Score | Rank |
|---|---|---|---|---|---|---|---|
| Inia Korowale; Sairusi Cavula | Men's | Pool A McHugh – Schumann (AUS); L 0 - 2 (9 - 21, 8 - 21); Williams – Stewart (TTO); L 0 - 2 (9 - 21, 17 - 21); Seabrookes – Hodge (SKN); W 2 - 0 (21 - 16, 21 - 11) | 3 | Did not advance | | | |
| Iliseva Ratudina; Laite Nima | Women's | Pool B Humana-Paredes – Pavan (CAN); L 0 - 2 (5 - 21, 8 - 21); Grimson – Palmer (ENG); L 0 - 2 (9 - 21, 7 - 21); Blackman – Grant (TTO); L 0 - 2 (18 - 21, 22 - 24) | 4 | Did not advance | | | |

== Boxing ==
Fiji participated with two athletes (2 men).

Men

| Athlete | Event | Round of 32 | Round of 16 | Quarterfinals | Semifinals | Final | Rank |
| Athlete | Event | Opposition Result | Opposition Result | Opposition Result | Opposition Result | Opposition Result | Rank |
|---|---|---|---|---|---|---|---|
| Jone Davule | −64 kg | Louis Colin (MRI); L 0-5 | Did not advance | | | | |
| Winston Hill | −69 kg | BYE | Lyndel Marcellin (LCA); W 3-2 | Stephen Newns (SCO); W 5-0 | Aidan Walsh (NIR); L 0-5 | Did not advance | 3rd place, bronze medalist(s) |

== Lawn bowls ==
Fiji will compete in Lawn bowls.

Men

| Athlete | Event | Group stage | | | | | | Quarterfinal | Semifinal | Final / BM | |
| Athlete | Event | Opposition Score | Opposition Score | Opposition Score | Opposition Score | Opposition Score | Rank | Opposition Score | Opposition Score | Opposition Score | Rank |
|---|---|---|---|---|---|---|---|---|---|---|---|
| Arun Kumar | Singles | Paxton (ENG); L 13 - 21 | McIlroy (NZL); L 15 - 21 | Xalxo (IND); L 11 - 21 | Kimani (KEN); W 21 - 5 | Newell (JAM); W 21 - 3 | 3 | Did not advance | | | |
| David Aitcheson; Rajnesh Prasad | Pairs | Papua New Guinea; W 20 - 16 | England; D 22 - 22 | Botswana; W 25 - 11 | New Zealand; L 11 - 18 | Cook Islands; L 17 - 22 | 4 | Did not advance | | | |
| Arun Kumar; Semesa Naiseruvatu; Kushal Pillay | Triples | Brunei; W 14 - 11 | Jersey; L 10 - 20 | Australia; L 3 - 28 | Botswana; W 19 - 12 | —N/a | 3 | Did not advance | | | |
| David Aitcheson; Semesa Naiseruvatu; Kushal Pillay; Rajnesh Prasad | Fours | Malaysia; L 9 - 18 | Namibia; W 14 - 11 | Northern Ireland; L 4 - 24 | Niue; W 20 - 9 | —N/a | 3 | Did not advance | | | |

Women

| Athlete | Event | Group stage | | | | | | Quarterfinal | Semifinal | Final / BM | |
| Athlete | Event | Opposition Score | Opposition Score | Opposition Score | Opposition Score | Opposition Score | Rank | Opposition Score | Opposition Score | Opposition Score | Rank |
|---|---|---|---|---|---|---|---|---|---|---|---|
| Litia Tikoisuva | Singles | Blumsky (NIU); W 21 - 9 | Saroji (MAS); L 19 - 20 | Pinki (IND); W 21 - 12 | Edwards (NZL); L 10 - 21 | Rednall (ENG); W 21 - 20 | 4 | Did not advance | | | |
| Sheral Mar; Doreen O'Connor | Pairs | New Zealand; L 16–17 | Tonga; W 21–11 | Canada; L 7–30 | Norfolk Island; W 12–11 | —N/a | 4 | Did not advance | | | |
| Loreta Kotoisuva; Radhika Prasad; Litia Tikoisuva | Triples | India; W 23 - 15 | Canada; L 15 - 19 | Papua New Guinea; L 16 - 17 | Australia; L 9 - 24 | —N/a | 5 | Did not advance | | | |
| Loreta Kotoisuva; Sheral Mar; Doreen O'Connor; Radhika Prasad | Fours | Northern Ireland; W 17 - 16 | Malta; W 20 - 12 | England; L 11 - 19 | India; L 9 - 24 | —N/a | 3 | Did not advance | | | |

== Netball ==
Fiji qualified a netball team by virtue of being ranked in the top 11 (excluding the host nation, Australia) of the INF World Rankings on July 1, 2017.

Roster

- Nina Cirikisuva
- Episake Gaunavinaka
- Alisi Naqiri
- Merelita Radininaceva
- Lusiani Rokoura
- Maliana Rusivakula
- Unouna Rusivakula
- Verenaisi Sawana
- Aliso Wainidroa
- Alesi Waqa
- Laisani Waqa
- Alanieta Waqainabete

Pool A

| Pos | Team | Pld | W | D | L | GF | GA | GD | Pts | Qualification |
|---|---|---|---|---|---|---|---|---|---|---|
| 1 | Australia (H) | 5 | 5 | 0 | 0 | 413 | 162 | +251 | 10 | Semi-finals |
| 2 | Jamaica | 5 | 4 | 0 | 1 | 351 | 221 | +130 | 8 | Semi-finals |
| 3 | South Africa | 5 | 3 | 0 | 2 | 310 | 205 | +105 | 6 | Classification matches |
| 4 | Northern Ireland | 5 | 2 | 0 | 3 | 224 | 307 | −83 | 4 | Classification matches |
| 5 | Barbados | 5 | 1 | 0 | 4 | 185 | 333 | −148 | 2 | Classification matches |
| 6 | Fiji | 5 | 0 | 0 | 5 | 171 | 426 | −255 | 0 | Classification matches |

Updated to match(es) played on 11 April 2018. Source: GC2018
(H) Hosts

5 April 2018
13:00

Report
Jamaica
88–30
Fiji

Gold Coast Convention and Exhibition Centre
Umpires: Jackie Mizon
Angela Armonstrong-Lush
Reserve umpire: Marc Henning
Fowler-Reid 40/43 (93%)
Aiken 24/32 (75%)
Robinson 15/16 (94%)
Beckford 9/11 (82%)

M. Rusivakula 17/19 (89%)
Waqa 7/11 (64%)
Paul 3/7 (43%)
U. Rusivakula 3/5 (60%)

7 April 2018
20:30

Report
Fiji
44–65
Barbados

Gold Coast Convention and Exhibition Centre
Umpires: Maria van der Merwe
Theresa Prince
Reserve umpire: Michelle Phippard
M. Rusivakula 27/31 (87%)
U. Rusivakula 10/12 (83%)
Waqa 7/8 (88%)

Wharton 33/38 (87%)
Blackman 22/28 (79%)
Payne 10/12 (83%)

9 April 2018
15:00

Report
Fiji
23–108
Australia

Gold Coast Convention and Exhibition Centre
Umpires: Angela Armstrong-Lush
Kristie Simpson
Reserve umpire: Jackie Mizon
Waqa 15/19 (79%)
M. Rusivakula 8/14 (57%)

Bassett 40/41 (98%)
Thwaites 30/31 (97%)
Pettitt 23/23 (100%)
Wood 15/19 (79%)

10 April 2018
18:30

Report
South Africa
92–28
Fiji

Gold Coast Convention and Exhibition Centre
Umpires: Michelle Phippard
Jackie Mizon
Reserve umpire: Kate Stephenson
Burger 56/59 (95%)
Venter 20/22 (91%)
Stoltz 16/21 (76%)

Waqa 19/26 (73%)
M. Rusivakula 8/12 (67%)
U. Rusivakula 1/2 (50%)

11 April 2018
14:00

Report
Northern Ireland
73–46
Fiji

Gold Coast Convention and Exhibition Centre
Umpires: Kristie Simpson
Maria van der Merwe
Reserve umpire: Gary Burgess
L. Bowman 59/65 (91%)
McCullough 10/14 (71%)
K. Bowman 4/8 (50%)

M. Rusivakula 25/32 (78%)
Waqa 21/30 (70%)

Eleventh place match

12 April 2018
16:00

Report
Fiji
32–81
Wales

Gold Coast Convention and Exhibition Centre
Umpires: Angela Armstrong-Lush
Kate Stephenson
Reserve umpire: Lisa McPhail
Cirikisuva 10/12 (83%)
Waqa 9/12 (75%)
M. Rusivakula 7/10 (70%)
U. Rusivakula 6/6 (100%)

Lewis 35/39 (90%)
Rowe 25/26 (96%)
Moseley 12/12 (100%)
Llewelyn 9/12 (75%)

== Rugby sevens ==
=== Men's tournament ===
Fiji qualified a men's team of 12 athletes by being among the top nine ranked nations from the Commonwealth in the 2016–17 World Rugby Sevens Series ranking. Samisoni Viriviri was added to replace the injured Semi Kunatani.

Roster

- Paula Dranisinukula
- Semi Kunatani
- Mesulame Kunavula
- Sevuloni Mocenecagi
- Alasio Naduva
- Amenoni Nasilasila
- Kalione Nasoko
- Vatemo Ravouvou
- Eroni Sau
- Jerry Tuwai
- Ratu Vakurinabili
- Jasa Veremalua
- Samisoni Viriviri

Pool D

| Pos | Team | Pld | W | D | L | PF | PA | PD | Pts | Qualification |
|---|---|---|---|---|---|---|---|---|---|---|
| 1 | Fiji | 3 | 3 | 0 | 0 | 138 | 22 | +116 | 9 | Semi-finals |
| 2 | Wales | 3 | 2 | 0 | 1 | 90 | 38 | +52 | 7 | Classification semi-finals |
| 3 | Uganda | 3 | 1 | 0 | 2 | 38 | 95 | −57 | 5 | |
| 4 | Sri Lanka | 3 | 0 | 0 | 3 | 27 | 138 | −111 | 3 | |

Source: GC2018
Rules for classification: 1) Points; 2) Head-to-head result; 3) Point difference; 4) Points scored.

14 April 2018
11:21

| Fiji | 63–5 | Sri Lanka |
| Try: Naduva (2) 1' c, 10' c Mocenacagi (3) 4' c, 6' c, 8' c Kunatani 7' c Dranisinukula 11' c Nasilasila (2) 13' c, 14' c Con: Ravouvou (4/4) 2', 4', 6', 7'; Nasilasila (5/5) 8', 10', 12', 13', 14' | (Gold Coast 2018) | Try: Wijekoon 1' m Con: Ratwatte (0/1) |

Robina Stadium, Gold Coast
Referee: Rasta Rasivhenge (South Africa)

14 April 2018
17:53

| Fiji | 54–0 | Uganda |
| Try: Tuwai 1' c Sau 2' c Mocenacagi 4' c Ravouvou 6' m Nasilasila 10' c Nasoko 12' c Vakurinabili 13' c Dranisinukula 14' c Con: Ravouvou (3/4) 1', 2', 4'; Nasilasila (3/3) 10', 14', 14'; Naduva (1/1) 12' | (Gold Coast 2018) |

Robina Stadium, Gold Coast
Referee: Damon Murphy (Australia)

14 April 2018
21:33

| Fiji | 21–17 | Wales |
| | (Gold Coast 2018) |

Robina Stadium, Gold Coast
Referee: Sam Grove-White (Scotland)

Semi-finals

15 April 2018
12:05

| South Africa | 19–24 (a.e.t.) | Fiji |
| Try: Specman (2) 9' c, 11' m Sage 13' c Con: Geduld (1/1) 9'; Afrika (1/2) 13' | (Gold Coast 2018) | Try: Sau 1' c Tuwai 4' m Mocenacagi 8' c Nasilasila 15'; Con: Nasilasila (2/3) 1', 8' |

Robina Stadium, Gold Coast
Referee: Richard Kelly (New Zealand)

Gold medal match

15 April 2018
15:04

| New Zealand | 14–0 | Fiji |
| Try: Nanai-Seturo 1' c Ware 3' c Con: Koroi (2/2) 1', 3 Pen: Knewstubb (0/1) | (Gold Goast 2018) | Cards: Mocenacagi (yellow card) 5' to 7' |

Robina Stadium, Gold Coast
Referee: Damon Murphy (Australia)

=== Women's tournament ===
Roster

- Lavena Cavuru
- Rusila Nagasau
- Ana Naimasi
- Miriama Naiobasali
- Litia Naiqato
- Timaima Ravisa
- Viniana Riwai
- Ana Roqica
- Pricilla Siata
- Vasiti Solikoviti
- Lavenia Tinai
- Luisa Tisolo

Pool B

| Pos | Team | Pld | W | D | L | PF | PA | PD | Pts | Qualification |
|---|---|---|---|---|---|---|---|---|---|---|
| 1 | Australia | 3 | 3 | 0 | 0 | 80 | 27 | +53 | 9 | Semi-finals |
| 2 | England | 3 | 2 | 0 | 1 | 74 | 34 | +40 | 7 | Semi-finals |
| 3 | Fiji | 3 | 1 | 0 | 2 | 44 | 41 | +3 | 5 | Classification semi-finals |
| 4 | Wales | 3 | 0 | 0 | 3 | 12 | 108 | −96 | 3 | Classification semi-finals |

Source: GC2018
Rules for classification: 1) Points; 2) Head-to-head result; 3) Point difference; 4) Points scored.

13 April 2018
17:15

| Fiji | 5–17 | England |
| Try: Ravisa 6' m Con: Nagasau (0/1) | (Gold Coast 2018) | Try: Fleming 1' m Scarratt 11' c Thompson 13' m Con: Hunt (1/3) 11' |

Robina Stadium, Gold Coast
Referee: Aimee Barrett-Theron (South Africa)

13 April 2018
19:55

| Fiji | 29–7 | Wales |
| Try: Tinai (3) 1' c, 5' c, 8' m Riwai 3' m Naimasi 10' m Con: Tinai (2/4) 1', 5'; Riwai (0/1) | (Gold Coast 2018) | Try: Joyce 13' c Con: Packer (1/1) 13' |

Robina Stadium, Gold Coast
Referee: Rose LaBreche (Canada)

13 April 2018
19:21

| Australia | 17–10 | Fiji |
| Try: Tonegato 1' m Caslick (2) 8' m, 13' c Con: Sykes (1/2) 13'; Cherry (0/1) | (Gold Coast 2018) | Try: Naiobasali (2) 2' m, 9' m Con: Tinai (0/1); Nagasau (0/1); Cards: Siata (yellow card) 11' to 13' |

Robina Stadium, Gold Coast
Referee: Sara Cox (England)

Lower classification round

| 15 April 2018 | Fiji | 40–12 | South Africa | Gold Coast |
| 9:31 |

Match for fifth place

| 15 April 2018 | Fiji | 40–5 | Kenya | Gold Coast |
| 12:49 |

== Shooting ==
Fiji participated with four athletes (4 men).

Men

| Athlete | Event | Qualification | | Final | |
| Athlete | Event | Points | Rank | Points | Rank |
|---|---|---|---|---|---|
| Glenn Kable | Trap | 118 | 5 Q | 17 | 6 |
| Christian Stephen | Trap | 107 | 23 | Did not advance | |
| Swee Phua | Double trap | 97 | 20 | Did not advance | |
| Quintyn Stephen | Double trap | 84 | 23 | Did not advance | |

== Squash ==
Fiji participated with four athletes (3 men and 1 woman).

Individual

| Athlete | Event | Round of 64 | Round of 32 | Round of 16 | Quarterfinals | Semifinals | Final | |
| Athlete | Event | Opposition Score | Opposition Score | Opposition Score | Opposition Score | Opposition Score | Opposition Score | Rank |
|---|---|---|---|---|---|---|---|---|
| Stephen Henry | Men's singles | Rukunya (UGA); L 0 - 3 | Did not advance | | | | | |
| Romit Parshottam | Men's singles | Laksiri (SRI); L 0 - 3 | Did not advance | | | | | |
| Sailesh Pala | Men's singles | Makin (WAL); L 0 - 3 | Did not advance | | | | | |
| Alison Mua | Women's singles | Bye | Perry (ENG); L 0 - 3 | Did not advance | | | | |

Doubles

| Athlete | Event | Group stage | | | Round of 16 | Quarterfinals | Semifinals | Final | |
| Athlete | Event | Opposition Score | Opposition Score | Rank | Opposition Score | Opposition Score | Opposition Score | Opposition Score | Rank |
|---|---|---|---|---|---|---|---|---|---|
| Sailesh Pala; Romit Parshottam | Men's doubles | Cuskelly / Pilley (AUS); L 0 - 2 | Patrick / Wilson (TTO); L 0 - 2 | 3 | Did not advance | | | | |
| Alison Mua; Stephen Henry | Mixed doubles | Waters / Selby (ENG); L 0 - 2 | Best / Simpson (BAR); L 0 - 2 | 3 | Did not advance | | | | |

== Swimming ==
Fiji participated with five athletes (3 men and 2 women).

Men

| Athlete | Event | Heat | | Semifinal | | Final | |
| Athlete | Event | Time | Rank | Time | Rank | Time | Rank |
|---|---|---|---|---|---|---|---|
| Paul Elaisa | 50 m freestyle | 24.77 | 42 | Did not advance | | | |
| Paul Elaisa | 100 m freestyle | 53.96 | 39 | Did not advance | | | |
| Paul Elaisa | 50 m butterfly | 26.94 | 40 | Did not advance | | | |
| Epeli Rabua | 50 m freestyle | 24.38 | 38 | Did not advance | | | |
| Epeli Rabua | 100 m freestyle | 54.02 | 40 | Did not advance | | | |
| Epeli Rabua | 50 m breaststroke | 29.61 | 16 Q | 29.79 | 16 | Did not advance | |
| Epeli Rabua | 100 m breaststroke | 1:05.46 | 15 Q | 1:05.09 | 16 | Did not advance | |
| Epeli Rabua | 50 m butterfly | 26.33 | 36 | Did not advance | | | |
| Epeli Rabua | 100 m butterfly | 58.91 | 24 | Did not advance | | | |
| Taichi Vakasama | 50 m breaststroke | 29.79 | 17 | Did not advance | | | |
| Taichi Vakasama | 100 m breaststroke | 1:04.25 | 13 Q | 1:04.39 | 13 | Did not advance | |
| Taichi Vakasama | 200 m breaststroke | 2:21.07 | 12 | —N/a | | Did not advance | |
| Taichi Vakasama | 200 m individual medley | 2:12.35 | 20 | —N/a | | Did not advance | |

Women

| Athlete | Event | Heat | | Semifinal | | Final | |
| Athlete | Event | Time | Rank | Time | Rank | Time | Rank |
|---|---|---|---|---|---|---|---|
| Matelita Buadromo | 50 m freestyle | 27.19 | 20 | Did not advance | | | |
| Matelita Buadromo | 400 m freestyle | 4:31.60 | 17 | —N/a | | Did not advance | |
| Matelita Buadromo | 50 m butterfly | 29.12 | 19 | Did not advance | | | |
| Matelita Buadromo | 100 m butterfly | 1:04.43 | 19 | Did not advance | | | |
| Matelita Buadromo | 200 m individual medley | 2:24.76 | 14 | —N/a | | Did not advance | |
| Cheyenne Rova | 50 m freestyle | 27.08 | 18 | Did not advance | | | |
| Cheyenne Rova | 100 m freestyle | 59.94 | 24 | Did not advance | | | |
| Cheyenne Rova | 50 m butterfly | 29.70 | 21 | Did not advance | | | |

== Table tennis ==
Fiji participated with five athletes (2 men and 3 women).

Singles

| Athletes | Event | Group stage | | | Round of 64 | Round of 32 | Round of 16 | Quarterfinal | Semifinal | Final | Rank |
| Athletes | Event | Opposition Score | Opposition Score | Rank | Opposition Score | Opposition Score | Opposition Score | Opposition Score | Opposition Score | Opposition Score | Rank |
|---|---|---|---|---|---|---|---|---|---|---|---|
| Philip Wing | Men's singles | Katungu (ZAM); L 1 - 4 | McCreery (NIR); L 0 - 4 | 3 | Did not advance | | | | | | |
| Vicky Wu | Men's singles | Vaea (TUV); W 4 - 0 | Tumaini (TAN); L 2 - 4 | 2 | Did not advance | | | | | | |
| Xuan Li | Women's singles | Lyne (MAS); L 0 - 4 | Lowe (GUY); L 1 - 4 | 3 | —N/a | Did not advance | | | | | |
| Grace Yee | Women's singles | Bye | | | —N/a | Payet (ENG); L 0 - 4 | Did not advance | | | | |
| Sally Yee | Women's singles | Bye | | | —N/a | Chang (MAS); L 0 - 4 | Did not advance | | | | |

Doubles

| Athletes | Event | Round of 64 | Round of 32 | Round of 16 | Quarterfinal | Semifinal | Final | Rank |
| Athletes | Event | Opposition Score | Opposition Score | Opposition Score | Opposition Score | Opposition Score | Opposition Score | Rank |
|---|---|---|---|---|---|---|---|---|
| Philip Wing; Vicky Wu | Men's doubles | Bye | Dookram / Wilson (TTO); L 0 - 3 | Did not advance | | | | |
| Grace Yee; Sally Yee | Women's doubles | —N/a | Bye | Ho / Lyne (MAS); L 0 - 3 | Did not advance | | | |
| Sally Yee; Philip Wing | Mixed doubles | Sam / Baah-Danso (GHA); L 0 - 3 | Did not advance | | | | | |
| Grace Yee; Vicky Wu | Mixed doubles | Bye | Taucoory / Ho Wan Kau (MRI); L 0 - 3 | Did not advance | | | | |

Team

| Athletes | Event | Group stage | | | Quarterfinal | Semifinal | Final | Rank |
| Athletes | Event | Opposition Score | Opposition Score | Rank | Opposition Score | Opposition Score | Opposition Score | Rank |
|---|---|---|---|---|---|---|---|---|
| Xuan Li; Grace Yee; Sally Yee | Women's team | Singapore; L 0 - 3 | Malaysia; L 0 - 3 | 3 | Did not advance | | | |

== Weightlifting ==
Fiji qualified seven weightlifters (three men and four women).

Men

| Athlete | Event | Snatch | | Clean & jerk | | Total | Rank |
| Athlete | Event | Result | Rank | Result | Rank | Total | Rank |
|---|---|---|---|---|---|---|---|
| Manueli Tulo | −56 kg | 104 | 4 | 135 | 3 | 239 | 4 |
| Poama Qaqa | −62 kg | 113 | 7 | 142 | 9 | 255 | 9 |
| Taniela Rainibogi | −85 kg | 140 | 6 | 173 | 8 | 313 | 7 |

Women

| Athlete | Event | Snatch | | Clean & jerk | | Total | Rank |
| Athlete | Event | Result | Rank | Result | Rank | Total | Rank |
|---|---|---|---|---|---|---|---|
| Seruwaia Malani | −48 kg | 60 | 9 | 76 | 9 | 136 | 9 |
| Maria Mareta | −58 kg | 68 | 10 | 86 | 13 | 154 | 12 |
| Apolonia Vaivai | −69 kg | 100 | 1 | 116 | 3 | 216 | 3rd place, bronze medalist(s) |
| Eileen Cikamatana | −90 kg | 103 | 2 | 130 | 1 | 233 | 1st place, gold medalist(s) |

== See also ==
- Fiji at the 2018 Summer Youth Olympics
