= Fiji at the Commonwealth Games =

- CG code: FIJ
- CGA: Fiji Association of Sports and National Olympic Committee
- Website: www.fasanoc.org.fj
- Medals Ranked 32nd: Gold 5 Silver 7 Bronze 12 Total 24

Commonwealth Games appearances (overview)
- 1938; 1950; 1954; 1958; 1962; 1966; 1970; 1974; 1978; 1982; 1986; 1990–1994; 1998; 2002; 2006; 2010; 2014; 2018; 2022; 2026; 2030

Fiji have competed in all but three Commonwealth Games since 1938, missing only 1990, 1994 and 2010. For the first two of those games they were not members of the Commonwealth following the military coup and declaration of a republic in 1987, and for the third they were suspended. Fiji have won twenty-four Commonwealth medals across six sports.

The country was suspended from the Commonwealth, and was banned from taking part in the 2010 Games, but was again represented with a team at the 2014 Commonwealth Games in Glasgow, Scotland.

== Medals ==
	(gold)	(silver)	(bronze)	Total
Fiji	4	7	12	23

Games	Gold	Silver	Bronze	Total	Rank
1938 Sydney	0	0	0	0	-
1950 Auckland	1	2	2	5	8
1954 Vancouver	0	0	0	0	-
1958 Cardiff	0	0	0	0	-
1962 Perth	0	0	2	2	15
1966 Kingston	0	0	0	0	-
1970 Edinburgh	0	0	1	1	22
1974 Christchurch	0	0	0	0	-
1978 Edmonton	0	0	0	0	-
1982 Brisbane	1	0	0	1	14
1986 Edinburgh	0	0	0	0	-
1990 Auckland	did not attend				
1994 Victoria	did not attend				
1998 Kuala Lumpur	0	1	0	1	28
2002 Manchester	1	1	1	3	20
2006 Melbourne	0	0	1	1	35
2010 Delhi	suspended				
2014 Glasgow	0	0	1	1	35
2018 Gold Coast	1	1	2	4	23
2022 Birmingham	0	2	2	4	29
Total	4	7	12	23	32

== See also ==
- All-time medal tally of Commonwealth Games
