= Fiji at the 1978 Commonwealth Games =

- CGF code: FIJ
- CGA: Fiji Association of Sports and National Olympic Committee
- Website: www.fijiolympiccommittee.com

in Edmonton, Alberta, Canada
- Competitors: 7 in 1 sport
- Medals: Gold 0 Silver 0 Bronze 0 Total 0

Commonwealth Games appearances (overview)
- 1938; 1950; 1954; 1958; 1962; 1966; 1970; 1974; 1978; 1982; 1986; 1990–1994; 1998; 2002; 2006; 2010; 2014; 2018; 2022; 2026; 2030

Fiji competed in the 1978 Commonwealth Games in Edmonton, Alberta, Canada from August 3 to August 12, 1978. All of their entrants competed in the lawn bowls competitions.

== Lawn bowls ==
Seven lawn bowlers represented Fiji in 1978.
