= Fiji at the 2026 Commonwealth Games =

- Flag of Fiji
- CG code: FIJ
- CGA: Fiji Association of Sports and National Olympic Committee
- Website: www.fasanoc.org.fj

in Glasgow, Scotland 23 July 2026 – 2 August 2026
- Competitors: 36 in 7 sports
- Flag bearer: David Young
- Baton bearer: Anahira McCutcheon
- Medals Ranked =20th: Gold 1 Silver 0 Bronze 1 Total 2

Commonwealth Games appearances (overview)
- 1938; 1950; 1954; 1958; 1962; 1966; 1970; 1974; 1978; 1982; 1986; 1990–1994; 1998; 2002; 2006; 2010; 2014; 2018; 2022; 2026; 2030

Fiji competed at the 2026 Commonwealth Games in Glasgow, Scotland. This marked Fiji's 17th appearance at the Commonwealth Games after making its debut in 1938.

The Fijian team consisted of 36 athletes in seven sports. The team also consisted of 22 team officials, for a total team size of 58. The Fijian team was the largest among the Pacific nations.

Swimmer David Young was the country's opening ceremony flagbearer. Meanwhile, swimmer Anahira McCutcheon was the baton bearer during the opening ceremony.

Fiji completed the Games with two medals: one gold and one bronze.

== Competitors ==
The following is the list of number of competitors participating at the Games per sport/discipline.

| Sport | | Men | Women | Total |
|---|---|---|---|---|
| 3x3 basketball | | 4 | 4 | 8 |
| Athletics | Athletics | 3 | 3 | 6 |
| Athletics | Para-athletics | 1 | 0 | 1 |
| Bowls | | 3 | 3 | 6 |
| Boxing | | 4 | 1 | 5 |
| Judo | | 1 | 0 | 1 |
| Swimming | | 5 | 2 | 7 |
| Weightlifting | | 2 | 0 | 2 |
| Total | | 23 | 13 | 36 |

== Medalists ==
The following Fijian athletes won a medal at the games. In the by discipline sections below, medallists' names are bolded.

| Medal | Name | Sport | Event | Date | Ref. |
|---|---|---|---|---|---|
| Gold | Taniela Rainibogi | Weightlifting | Men's 110 kg | 30 July | |
| Bronze | Jasmine Daunakamakama | Boxing | Women's 57 kg | 31 July | |

== Athletics ==
Fiji entered seven athletes (four men and three women), including one para athlete.

Key

Ranks given for track events are within the athlete's heat only.

- **Q** = Qualified for the next round
- **q** = Qualified for the next round as a fastest loser or, in field events, by position without achieving the qualifying target

Track events
Men

| Athlete | Event | Heat | | Semifinal | | Final | |
| Athlete | Event | Result | Rank | Result | Rank | Result | Rank |
|---|---|---|---|---|---|---|---|
| Yeshnil Karan | Men's mile | 4:12.28 | 12 | —N/a | | Did not advance | |
| Yeshnil Karan | Men's 5000 m | —N/a | | | | 14:35.76 | 21 |
| Errol Qaqa | Men's 110 m hurdles | 14.66 | 7 | —N/a | | Did not advance | |
| Heleina Young | Women's 100 m | 11.76 | 4 | Did not advance | | | |
| Heleina Young | Women's 200 m | 24.45 | 6 | Did not advance | | | |
| Adi Ceva Sova Lutumailagi | Women's 800 m | 2:22.58 | 6 | Did not advance | | | |
| Glandness Simpson | Women's 800 m | DQ | | Did not advance | | | |

Field event

| Athlete | Event | Final | |
| Athlete | Event | Distance | Rank |
|---|---|---|---|
| Rusiate Matai | Men's high jump | 2.05 | 9 |

=== Para athletics ===
Field event

| Athlete | Event | Final | |
| Athlete | Event | Distance | Rank |
|---|---|---|---|
| Sitiveni Konataci | Men's discus throw (F44) | 27.54 | 9 |

== 3x3 basketball ==
Fiji qualified a men's and women's 3x3 basketball teams. This marked the country's debut in the sport at the Commonwealth Games. The full squads were announced on 13 June 2026.

Summary

| Team | Event | Group stage | | | | | | Play-ins | Semifinal | Final / BM / CM | |
| Team | Event | Opposition Score | Opposition Score | Opposition Score | Opposition Score | Opposition Score | Rank | Opposition Score | Opposition Score | Opposition Score | Rank |
|---|---|---|---|---|---|---|---|---|---|---|---|
| Fiji men | Men's tournament | Malaysia; **L** 16–21 | England; **L** 13–21 | Jamaica; **W** 21–15 | Singapore; **L** 7–21 | Kenya; **L** 9–22 | 5 | Did not advance | | | 10 |
| Fiji women | Women's tournament | Cayman Islands; **W** 16–6 | Kenya; **L** 14–16 OT | Australia; **L** 3–21 | Uganda; **L** 8–21 | Jamaica; **L** 15–17 | 5 | Did not advance | | | 10 |

=== Men's tournament ===
Squad

- Joshua Fox
- Filimone Waqabaca
- Keenan Hughes
- Issac Sewabu

Group B

| Pos | Team | Pld | W | L | PF | PA | PD | Qualification |
|---|---|---|---|---|---|---|---|---|
| 1 | England | 5 | 5 | 0 | 105 | 70 | +35 | Direct to semi-finals |
| 2 | Malaysia | 5 | 4 | 1 | 103 | 82 | +21 | Quarter-finals |
| 3 | Singapore | 5 | 2 | 3 | 88 | 86 | +2 | Quarter-finals |
| 4 | Kenya | 5 | 2 | 3 | 82 | 82 | 0 | |
| 5 | Fiji | 5 | 1 | 4 | 66 | 97 | −31 | |
| 6 | Jamaica | 5 | 1 | 4 | 77 | 104 | −27 | |

Source: Glasgow 2026
Rules for classification: 1) Wins; 2) Head-to-head record; 3) Points scored.

25 July 2026
10:50

Report

| **Malaysia** | **21**–16 | Fiji |
| Pts: Ting 7 | | Pts: Sewabu 7 |

SEC, Glasgow

25 July 2026
15:45

Report

| **England** | **21**–13 | Fiji |
| Pts: Lautier-Ogunleye 13 | | Pts: Waqabaca 5 |

SEC, Glasgow

25 July 2026
20:40

Report

| **Fiji** | **21**–15 | Jamaica |
| Pts: Waqabaca 10 | | Pts: McDonald 6 |

SEC, Glasgow

27 July 2026
11:55

Report

| **Singapore** | **21**–7 | Fiji |
| Pts: Ching 10 | | Pts: Sewabu 3 |

SEC, Glasgow

27 July 2026
19:05

Report

| **Kenya** | **22**–9 | Fiji |
| Pts: Gichohi 14 | | Pts: Sewabu 4 |

SEC, Glasgow

=== Women's tournament ===
Squad

- Estelle Kainamoli
- Moana Liebregts
- Ranadi Koroi
- Aulou Tuisue

Group A

| Pos | Team | Pld | W | L | PF | PA | PD | Qualification |
|---|---|---|---|---|---|---|---|---|
| 1 | Australia | 5 | 5 | 0 | 105 | 33 | +72 | Direct to semi-finals |
| 2 | Uganda | 5 | 4 | 1 | 90 | 58 | +32 | Quarter-finals |
| 3 | Jamaica | 5 | 3 | 2 | 89 | 75 | +14 | Quarter-finals |
| 4 | Kenya | 5 | 2 | 3 | 63 | 85 | −22 | |
| 5 | Fiji | 5 | 1 | 4 | 56 | 81 | −25 | |
| 6 | Cayman Islands | 5 | 0 | 5 | 29 | 100 | −71 | |

Source: Glasgow 2026
Rules for classification: 1) Wins; 2) Head-to-head record; 3) Points scored.

24 July 2026
11:15

Report

| **Fiji** | **16**–6 | Cayman Islands |
| Pts: Tuisue 7 | | Pts: O'Connor 4 |

SEC, Glasgow

24 July 2026
17:00

Report

| **Kenya** | **16**–14 (OT) | Fiji |
| Pts: Omondi 6 | | Pts: Kainamoli 6 |

SEC, Glasgow

24 July 2026
21:05

Report

| **Australia** | **21**–3 | Fiji |
| Pts: Clarke 10 | | Pts: Koroi 2 |

SEC, Glasgow

26 July 2026
13:35

Report

| **Uganda** | **21**–8 | Fiji |
| Pts: three players 7 | | Pts: Tuisue 5 |

SEC, Glasgow

26 July 2026
17:25

Report

| Fiji | 15–**17** | **Jamaica** |
| Pts: Kainamoli 7 | | Pts: Bryan 7 |

SEC, Glasgow

== Bowls ==
Fiji entered six bowlers (three per gender).

| Athlete | Event | Group Stage | | | | | | | Semifinal | Final / BM |
| Athlete | Event | Opposition Score | Opposition Score | Opposition Score | Opposition Score | Opposition Score | Rank | Opposition Score | Opposition Score | Rank |
|---|---|---|---|---|---|---|---|---|---|---|
| Rajnesh Prasad | Men's singles | Tolchard (ENG); **W** 1*–1 | Simpson (JAM); **W** 2–0 | Banks (SCO); **W** 1*–1 | Qureshi (PAK); **L** 0–2 | Owen (WAL); **L** 0–2 | 4 | Did not advance | | |
| Lal Prasad; Surendra Prasad | Men's pairs | New Zealand; **L** 1–1* | Australia; **L** 0–2 | Pakistan; **W** 1*–1 | Tonga; **L** 1–1* | Northern Ireland; **L** 0–2 | 5 | Did not advance | | |
| Elizabeth Moceiwai | Women's singles | McGrouther (SCO); **L** 0–2 | Nathan (TGA); **L** 0.5–1.5 | Wilson (NFK); **L** 0–2 | Viljoen (NAM); **L** 0.5–1.5 | Mbugua (KEN); **W** 1*–1 | 6 | Did not advance | | |
| Litia Tikoisuva; Losalini Tukai | Women's pairs | Botswana; **W** 1.5–0.5 | Wales; **L** 0–2 | Kenya; **W** 1.5–0.5 | New Zealand; **L** 0–2 | Canada; **L** 0–2 | 4 | Did not advance | | |

== Boxing ==
Fiji entered a team of five boxers (four men and one woman), announced on 13 June 2026. Jasmine Daunakamakama became the first women's boxer to win a medal for the country at the Commonwealth Games, when she won bronze in the women's 57 kg event.

| Athlete | Event | Round of 32 | Round of 16 | Quarterfinals | Semifinals | Final | |
| Athlete | Event | Opposition Result | Opposition Result | Opposition Result | Opposition Result | Opposition Result | Rank |
|---|---|---|---|---|---|---|---|
| Jone Davule | Men's 60 kg | Ullah (PAK); **L** 0–5 | Did not advance | | | | |
| Ben Maukakala | Men's 65 kg | Campbell (NZL); **L** RSC | Did not advance | | | | |
| Elijah Qiokata | Men's 70 kg | Bye | Nettey (GHA); **L** RSC | Did not advance | | | |
| Aminiasi Saratibau | Men's 80 kg | Bye | Ofori (CAN); **L** RSC | Did not advance | | | |
| **Jasmine Daunakamakama** | Women's 57 kg | —N/a | Djabatey (GHA); **W** 5–0 | Hansika (SRI); **W** 4–1 | Walsh (NIR); **L** 0–5 | Did not advance | 3rd place, bronze medalist(s) |

== Judo ==
Fiji entered one male judoka.

| Athlete | Event | Round of 16 | Quarterfinals | Semifinals | Repechage | Final/BM | |
| Athlete | Event | Opposition Result | Opposition Result | Opposition Result | Opposition Result | Opposition Result | Rank |
|---|---|---|---|---|---|---|---|
| Gerard Takayawa | Men's +100 kg | Adam Hall (NIR); **W** 101s1–000s2 | Bessong (CAN); **L** 000–100 | Did not advance | Miller (SCO); **L** 001s1–010s2 | Did not advance | 7 |

== Swimming ==
Fiji entered seven swimmers (five men and two women). David Young became the first Fijian swimmer to qualify for a Commonwealth Games final.

Men

| Athlete | Event | Heat | | Semifinal | | Final | |
| Athlete | Event | Time | Rank | Time | Rank | Time | Rank |
|---|---|---|---|---|---|---|---|
| Hansel McCaig | 50 m freestyle | 23.51 | 26 | Did not advance | | | |
| Hansel McCaig | 100 m freestyle | 52.47 | 39 | Did not advance | | | |
| Hansel McCaig | 50 m butterfly | 25.00 | 31 | Did not advance | | | |
| Reuben Taylor | 50 m freestyle | 23.99 | 34 | Did not advance | | | |
| Reuben Taylor | 100 m freestyle | 53.29 | 46 | Did not advance | | | |
| Reuben Taylor | 50 m butterfly | 26.18 | 48 | Did not advance | | | |
| David Young | 50 m freestyle | 22.16 | 6 **Q** | 22.09 | 6 **Q** | 22.18 | 6 |
| David Young | 100 m freestyle | 24.28 | 17 **R** | Did not advance | | | |
| David Young | 50 m butterfly | 50.84 | 26 | Did not advance | | | |
| Samuel Yalimaiwai | 50 m breaststroke | 28.11 | 15 **Q** | 28.23 | 14 | Did not advance | |
| Samuel Yalimaiwai | 100 m breaststroke | 1:05.60 | 28 | Did not advance | | | |
| Don Younger | 50 m breaststroke | 29.03 | 30 | Did not advance | | | |
| Don Younger | 100 m breaststroke | 1:08.18 | 35 | Did not advance | | | |
| Don Younger | 200 m breaststroke | 2:39.77 | 16 | —N/a | | Did not advance | |
| Hansel McCaig; Reuben Taylor; David Young; Don Younger | 4 × 100 m freestyle relay | 3:33.08 | 12 | —N/a | | Did not advance | |
| Hansel McCaig; Reuben Taylor; Samuel Yalimaiwai; David Young | 4 × 100 m medley relay | 4:02.77 | 13 | —N/a | | Did not advance | |

Women & Mixed

| Athlete | Event | Heat | | Semifinal | | Final | |
| Athlete | Event | Time | Rank | Time | Rank | Time | Rank |
|---|---|---|---|---|---|---|---|
| Anahira McCutcheon | Women's 50 m freestyle | 25.45 | 10 **Q** | 25.53 | 12 | Did not advance | |
| Anahira McCutcheon | Women's 100 m freestyle | 55.78 | 15 **Q** | 55.80 | 13 | Did not advance | |
| Anahira McCutcheon | Women's 50 m butterfly | 27.09 | 12 **Q** | 27.01 | 12 | Did not advance | |
| Kelera Mudunasoko | Women's 50 m breaststroke | 33.63 | 19 | Did not advance | | | |
| Kelera Mudunasoko | Women's 100 m breaststroke | 1:16.05 | 23 | Did not advance | | | |
| Kelera Mudunasoko | Women's 200 m breaststroke | 2:47.86 | 14 | —N/a | | Did not advance | |
| Hansel McCaig; David Young; Anahira McCutcheon; Kelera Mudunasoko | Mixed 4 × 100 m medley relay | 4:17.01 | 16 | —N/a | | Did not advance | |

== Weightlifting ==
On 18 May 2026, the IWF Commonwealth Games weightlifting ranking lists were finalised. The top eight ranked lifters, limited to one per CGA, and not including Scotland (who got automatic host spots) and the directly qualified reigning Commonwealth Weightlifting champions, gained a quota place for the games in their weight class. Fiji ultimately qualified two male weightlifters.

| Athlete | Event | Snatch (kg) | | Clean & Jerk (kg) | | Total (kg) | Rank |
| Athlete | Event | Result | Rank | Result | Rank | Total (kg) | Rank |
|---|---|---|---|---|---|---|---|
| Apakuki Wakanibua | Men's 65 kg | 95 | 10 | 120 | 8 | 215 | 9 |
| **Taniela Rainibogi** | Men's 110 kg | 170 **GR** | 1 | 208 **GR** | 1 | 378 **GR** | 1st place, gold medalist(s) |
