= Fiji at the 1962 British Empire and Commonwealth Games =

- CG code: FIJ
- CGA: Fiji Association of Sports and National Olympic Committee
- Website: www.fijiolympiccommittee.com

in Perth, Western Australia
- Flag bearers: Opening: Closing:
- Medals Ranked =15thth: Gold 0 Silver 0 Bronze 2 Total 2

British Empire and Commonwealth Games appearances
- 1938; 1950; 1954; 1958; 1962; 1966; 1970; 1974; 1978; 1982; 1986; 1990–1994; 1998; 2002; 2006; 2010; 2014; 2018; 2022; 2026; 2030

Fiji competed at the 1962 British Empire and Commonwealth Games in Perth, Western Australia, from 22 November to 1 December 1962.

== Medalists ==
Medal	Name	Sport	Event	Date
Bronze	Moses Evans	Boxing	Men's middleweight	
Bronze	Holgar Johansen	Boxing	Men's heavyweight	

== Athletics ==
Men
Track events

Athlete	Event	Round 1		Round 2		Semifinal		Final	
Athlete	Event	Result	Rank	Result	Rank	Result	Rank	Result	Rank
Sitiveni Moceidreke	100 yd	10.0	3 Q	10.2	6	did not advance			
Sitiveni Moceidreke	220 yd	22.3	4 Q	23.2	6	did not advance			

Field events

Athlete	Event	Final	
Athlete	Event	Distance	Rank
William Liga	Javelin throw	211 ft 5 in (64.44 m)	6

Women
Track events

Athlete	Event	Round 1		Semifinal		Final	
Athlete	Event	Result	Rank	Result	Rank	Result	Rank
Maca Vakalala	100 yd	11.6	5	did not advance			
Maca Vakalala	220 yd	27.1	5	did not advance			

== See also ==
- Fiji at the 1960 Summer Olympics
