= Fiji at the 1938 British Empire Games =

- CG code: FIJ

in Sydney, Australia
- Competitors: 6
- Medals Ranked =11th: Gold 0 Silver 0 Bronze 0 Total 0

British Empire Games appearances
- 1938; 1950; 1954; 1958; 1962; 1966; 1970; 1974; 1978; 1982; 1986; 1990–1994; 1998; 2002; 2006; 2010; 2014; 2018; 2022; 2026; 2030

Fiji made its British Empire Games début in 1938 in Sydney, Australia.

The colony competed only in lawn bowls, sending competitors to the men's doubles and the men's fours events. (Lawn bowls events at the 1938 Games were for men only.) Fiji's representatives did not win any medals.

== Medals ==
| | (gold) | (silver) | (bronze) | Total |
|---|---|---|---|---|
| Fiji | 0 | 0 | 0 | 0 |

== Sources ==
- Fiji results for the 1938 Games, Commonwealth Games Federation
