= Fiji at the 1950 British Empire Games =

- CGF code: FIJ

in Auckland, New Zealand
- Medals Ranked 8th: Gold 1 Silver 2 Bronze 2 Total 5

British Empire Games appearances
- 1938; 1950; 1954; 1958; 1962; 1966; 1970; 1974; 1978; 1982; 1986; 1990–1994; 1998; 2002; 2006; 2010; 2014; 2018; 2022; 2026; 2030

After first competing in 1938, Fiji returned to the British Empire Games in 1950 in Auckland, New Zealand. The colony sent only male competitors. They entered a total of six events in athletics, and three events in lawn bowls.

The 1950 Games have been Fiji's most successful to date. Fiji competitors won a total of 5 medals (including one gold), and finished 8th (out of 12) on the medal table.

== Medals ==
| | (gold) | (silver) | (bronze) | Total |
|---|---|---|---|---|
| Fiji | 1 | 2 | 2 | 5 |

=== Gold ===
==== Athletics ====
- Men's shot put: Mataika Tuicakau: 48 ft 0 1/4 in (14.637 m)

=== Silver ===
==== Athletics ====
- Men's discus throw: Mataika Tuicakau: 144 ft 2 1/2 in (43.955 m)
- Men's javelin: Luke Tunabuna: 183 ft 9 1/2 in (56.020 m)

=== Bronze ===
==== Lawn bowls ====
- Men's doubles: Leslie Brown and James Poulton: 41 points
- Men's singles: Lionel F. Garnett: 90 points

== Sources ==
- Fiji results for the 1950 Games, Commonwealth Games Federation
