= Waisea =

Waisea is a Fijian given name. Notable people with the name include:

- Waisea Luveniyali (born 1984), Fijian rugby union footballer
- Waisea Nacuqu (born 1993), Fijian rugby union footballer
- Waisea Nailago (born 1989), Fijian rugby union footballer
- Waisea Nayacalevu (born 1990), Fijian rugby union footballer
- Waisea Turaga, Fijian international lawn bowler

== See also ==
- Waisale
