= Waisale =

Waisale is a Fijian given name. Notable people with the name include:

- Waisale Dausoko (born 1996), Fijian long jumper
- Waisale Serevi (born 1968), Fijian rugby union footballer and coach
- Waisale Sovatabua (born 1973), Fijian rugby league footballer
- Waisale Sukanaveita (born 1984), Fijian rugby league and union footballer
- Waisale Vatubua, Fijian rugby league and union footballer
- Waisale Vatuvoka (born 1983), Fijian rugby union footballer
- Waisale Waqanivalu (born 1979), Fijian serial killer

== See also ==
- Waisea
