= Martin Fong (bowls) =

Fijian bowls player

Personal information
- Nationality: Fijian
- Born: 11 July 1983 (age 41)

Martin Fong (born 11 July 1983) is a Fijian international lawn bowler. He has represented Fiji at the Commonwealth Games.

In 2022, he was selected for the 2022 Commonwealth Games in Birmingham where he competed in two events; the men's triples (with David Aitcheson and Semesa Naiseruvati), where he reached the bronze medal play off and just missed out on a medal and the men's fours.
