= Table tennis at the 2017 Pacific Mini Games =

Table tennis at the 2017 Pacific Mini Games in Port Vila, Vanuatu was held on December 4–14, 2017.

== Medal summary ==
=== Medal table ===
Host nation

Rank	Nation	Gold	Silver	Bronze	Total
1	Vanuatu (VAN)*	6	2	3	11
2	Fiji (FIJ)	4	2	4	10
3	New Caledonia (NCL)	1	5	1	7
4	Papua New Guinea (PNG)	0	1	1	2
5	Tuvalu (TUV)	0	1	0	1
6	Solomon Islands (SOL)	0	0	1	1
Totals (6 entries)		11	11	10	32

=== Men's ===
Event	Gold	Silver	Bronze
Singles	Yoshua Jordan Shing (VAN)	Jeremy Dey (NCL)	Wang Qi (FIJ)
Doubles	Vanuatu (VAN); Frexly Ham Lulu, Yoshua Jordan Shing	Papua New Guinea (PNG); Geoffrey Loi, Gasika Sepa Simoi	New Caledonia (NCL); Jeremy Dey, Adrien Cerveaux
Team	Vanuatu; Frexly Ham Lulu; Yoshua Jordan Shing; Randy William; Alan Lam	New Caledonia; Jeremy Dey; Nolann Charles; Adrien Cerveaux; Arthur Mas	Fiji; Wang Qi; Philip Wing; Vicky Wu; Young Park

=== Men's Para ===
Event	Gold	Silver	Bronze
Ambulant Singles	John Christopher (FIJ)	Avelino Monteiro (NCL)	Haoda Agari (PNG)
Seated Singles	Iakoba Taubakoa (FIJ)	Ioane Hawaii (TUV)	Shadrack Timothy (SOL)

=== Women's ===
Event	Gold	Silver	Bronze
Singles	Priscilla Tommy (VAN)	Stephanie Qwea (VAN)	Anolyn Flyn Lulu (VAN)
Doubles	New Caledonia (NCL); Ornella Bouteille; La Lorie	Fiji (FIJ); Grace Yee; Sally Yee	Vanuatu (VAN); Anolyn Flyn Lulu; Liopa Liupekena Santhy
Team	Vanuatu (VAN); Anolyn Flyn Lulu; Stephanie Qwea; Liopa Liupekena Santhy; Priscilla Tommy	New Caledonia (NCL); Ornella Bouteille; La Lorie; Jade Pabouty; Anais Paul	Fiji (FIJ); Xuan Li; Grace Yee; Harvi Yee; Sally Yee

=== Women's Para ===
Event	Gold	Silver	Bronze
Ambulant Singles	Laniana Serukalou (FIJ)	Delphine Andre (NCL)	Mary Mall Ramel (VAN)
Seated Singles	Merewalesi Roden (FIJ)	Akanisi Latu (FIJ)	

=== Mixed ===
Event	Gold	Silver	Bronze
Doubles	Vanuatu (VAN); Yoshua Jordan Shing; Anolyn Flyn Lulu	Vanuatu (VAN); Frexly Ham Lulu; Priscilla Tommy	Fiji (FIJ); Wang Qi; Grace Yee

== Men's tournaments ==
=== Preliminary round ===
Team	Pld	W	D	L	Sets	Pts
1. Vanuatu	6	6	0	0	28–2	12
2. New Caledonia	6	4	0	1	25–5	11
3. Papua New Guinea	6	4	0	2	18–12	10
4. Fiji	6	3	0	3	18–12	9
5. Tuvalu	6	2	0	3	11–14	8
6. (Wallis and Futuna) Wallis & Futuna	6	1	0	5	5–25	7
7. Kiribati	6	0	0	6	0–30	0

	(New Caledonia) NCL	(Vanuatu) VAN	(Fiji) FIJ	(Papua New Guinea) PNG	(Kiribati) KIR	(Tuvalu) TUV	(Wallis and Futuna) WLF
New Caledonia	—	—	—	4–1	5–0	—	—
Vanuatu	3–2	—	—	5–0	5–0	5–0	—
Fiji	1–4	0–5	—	2–3	5–0	5–0	5–0
Papua New Guinea	—	—	—	—	5–0	—	—
Kiribati	—	—	—	—	—	—	—
Tuvalu	0–5	—	—	1–4	5–0	—	5–0
(Wallis and Futuna) Wallis & Futuna	0–5	0–5	—	0–5	5–0	—	—

=== Matches ===
4 December 2017; 9:00	Report	New Caledonia	4–1	Papua New Guinea
Score by game:
Jeremy Dey	3–0	Gasika Lahui Sepa Simoi
Arthur Mas	1–3	Geoffrey Loi
Adrien Cerveaux	3–0	Haoda Agari
Jeremy Dey	3–1	Geoffrey Loi
Arthur Mas	3–1	Gasika Lahui Sepa Simoi
–

4 December 2017; 9:00	Report	Vanuatu	W–O	Kiribati

4 December 2017; 9:00	Report	Fiji	5–0	Tuvalu
Score by game:
Wang Qi	3–0	Tulimanu Vaea
Philip Wing	3–0	Kalton Melton
Young Park	3–1	Moeaki Fapaologa
Wang Qi	3–0	Kalton Melton
Philip Wing	3–0	Tulimanu Vaea
–

4 December 2017; 12:30	Report	New Caledonia	W–O	Kiribati

4 December 2017; 12:30	Report	Vanuatu	5–0	Tuvalu
Score by game:
Frexly Ham Lulu	3–0	Kalton Melton
Yoshua Jordan Shing	3–0	Tulimanu Vaea
Randy William	3–0	Masoli Tom
Frexly Ham Lulu	3–0	Tulimanu Vaea
Yoshua Jordan Shing	3–0	Kalton Melton
–

4 December 2017; 12:30	Report	Fiji	5–0	Wallis and Futuna
Score by game:
Philip Wing	3–0	Setuli Paulo Masei
Vicky Wu	3–0	Pascal Seuru
Young Park	3–0	–
Philip Wing	3–0	Pascal Seuru
Vicky Wu	3–0	Setuli Paulo Masei
–

5 December 2017; 10:00	Report	Wallis & Futuna (Wallis and Futuna)	0–5	Vanuatu
Score by game:
Pascal Seuru	0–3	Frexly Ham Lulu
Setuli Paulo Masei	0–3	Randy William
–	0–3	Alan Lam
Pascal Seuru	0–3	Randy William
Setuli Paulo Masei	0–3	Frexly Ham Lulu
–

5 December 2017; 10:00	Report	Fiji	2–3	Papua New Guinea
Score by game:
Wang Qi	3–0	Gasika Lahui Sepa Simoi
Philip Wing	1–3	Geoffrey Loi
Vicky Wu	3–0	Haoda Agari
Wang Qi	2–3	Geoffrey Loi
Philip Wing	1–3	Gasika Lahui Sepa Simoi
–

5 December 2017; 10:00	Report	Tuvalu	W–O	Kiribati

5 December 2017; 14:00	Report	Tuvalu	0–5	New Caledonia
Score by game:
Tulimanu Vaea	0–3	Adrien Cerveaux
Kalton Melton	0–3	Nolann Charles
Moeaki Fapaologa	0–3	Arthur Mas
Tulimanu Vaea	0–3	Nolann Charles
Kalton Melton	0–3	Adrien Cerveaux
–

5 December 2017; 14:00	Report	Vanuatu	5–0	Papua New Guinea
Score by game:
Yoshua Jordan Shing	3–0	Gasika Lahui Sepa Simoi
Frexly Ham Lulu	3–1	Geoffrey Loi
Alan Lam	3–0	Haoda Agari
Yoshua Jordan Shing	3–0	Geoffrey Loi
Frexly Ham Lulu	3–1	Gasika Lahui Sepa Simoi
–

5 December 2017; 14:00	Report	Wallis & Futuna (Wallis and Futuna)	W–O	Kiribati

5 December 2017; 18:00	Report	Vanuatu	5–0	New Caledonia
Score by game:
Yoshua Jordan Shing	3–1	Nolann Charles
Frexly Ham Lulu	1–3	Jeremy Dey
Alan Lam	0–3	Adrien Cerveaux
Yoshua Jordan Shing	3–1	Jeremy Dey
Frexly Ham Lulu	3–1	Nolann Charles
–

5 December 2017; 14:00	Report	Fiji	W–O	Kiribati

5 December 2017; 14:00	Report	Wallis & Futuna (Wallis and Futuna)	0–5	Papua New Guinea
Score by game:
Pascal Seuru	0–3	Geoffrey Loi
Setuli Paulo Masei	0–3	Gasika Lahui Sepa Simoi
–	0–3	Haoda Agari
Pascal Seuru	0–3	Gasika Lahui Sepa Simoi
Setuli Paulo Masei	0–3	Geoffrey Loi
–

6 December 2017; 09:00	Report	Fiji	1–4	New Caledonia
Score by game:
Wang Qi	3–0	Nolann Charles
Philip Wing	1–3	Jeremy Dey
Vicky Dey	0–3	Arthur Mas
Wang Qi	2–3	Jeremy Dey
Philip Wing	2–3	Nolann Charles
–

6 December 2017; 09:00	Report	Papua New Guinea	W–O	Kiribati

6 December 2017; 09:00	Report	Tuvalu	5–0	Wallis and Futuna
Score by game:
Kalton Melton	3–0	Pascal Seuru
Tulimanu Vaea	3–0	Setuli Paulo Masei
Masoli Tom	3–0	–
Kalton Melton	3–0	Setuli Paulo Masei
Tulimanu Vaea	3–0	Pascal Seuru
–

6 December 2017; 13:30	Report	Wallis & Futuna (Wallis and Futuna)	0–5	New Caledonia
Score by game:
Pascal Seuru	0–3	Adrien Cerveaux
Setuli Paulo Masei	0–3	Arthur Mas
–	0–3	Jeremy Dey
Pascal Seuru	0–3	Arthur Mas
Setuli Paulo Masei	0–3	Adrien Cerveaux
–

6 December 2017; 13:30	Report	Fiji	0–5	Vanuatu
Score by game:
Philip Wing	0–3	Frexly Ham Lulu
Vicky Wu	0–3	Yoshua Jordan Shing
Young Park	1–3	Alan Lam
Philip Wing	1–3	Yoshua Jordan Shing
Vicky Wu	0–3	Frexly Ham Lulu
–

6 December 2017; 09:00	Report	Tuvalu	1–4	Papua New Guinea
Score by game:
Tulimanu Vaea	0–3	Geoffrey Loi
Kalton Melton	1–3	Gasika Lahui Sepa Simoi
Masoli Tom	3–2	Haoda Agari
Tulimanu Vaea	0–3	Gasika Lahui Sepa Simoi
Kalton Melton	1–3	Geoffrey Loi
–

=== Third place ===
6 December 2017; 18:30	Report	Fiji	3–1	Papua New Guinea
Score by game:
Wang Qi	3–0	Gasika Lahui Sepa Simoi
Philip Wing	1–3	Geoffrey Loi
Vicky Wu	3–0	Haoda Agari
Wang Qi	2–1	Geoffrey Loi
Philip Wing	–––	Gasika Lahui Sepa Simoi
–

=== Final ===
6 December 2017; 18:30	Report	Vanuatu	3–1	New Caledonia
Score by game:
Yoshua Jordan Shing	3–2	Jeremy Dey
Frexly Ham Lulu	3–1	Nolann Charles
Alan Lam	1–3	Adrien Cerveaux
Yoshua Jordan Shing	3–1	Nolann Charles
Frexly Ham Lulu	–––	Jeremy Dey
–

=== Preliminary round ===
Team	Pld	W	D	L	Sets	Pts
1. Vanuatu	4	4	0	0	19–1	8
2. Fiji	4	3	0	1	15–5	7
3. New Caledonia	4	3	0	1	14–6	5
4. Papua New Guinea	4	1	0	3	6–13	5
5. Solomon Islands	4	1	0	3	4–15	5
6. Tuvalu	4	0	0	4	0–18	4

	(New Caledonia) NCL	(Vanuatu) VAN	(Fiji) FIJ	(Solomon Islands) SOL	(Papua New Guinea) PNG	(Tuvalu) TUV
New Caledonia	—			5–0		
Vanuatu	4–1	—		5–0	5–0	5–0
Fiji	1–4		—	5–0	4–1	
Solomon Islands				—		
Papua New Guinea	1–4				—	4–0
Tuvalu			0–5	0–4		—

=== Matches ===
4 December 2017; 11:00	Report	New Caledonia	5–0	Solomon Islands
Score by game:
Lorie La	3–0	Connie Sifi
Ornella Bouteille	3–0	Lalmah Sifi
Anais Paul	3–0	–
Lorie La	3–0	Lalmah Sifi
Ornella Bouteille	3–0	Connie Sifi
–

4 December 2017; 11:00	Report	Vanuatu	5–0	Papua New Guinea
Score by game:
Priscila Tommy	3–0	Idau Boni Chris
Anolyn Lulu	3–0	Loa Mabel Chris
Liopa Santhy	3–0	–
Priscila Tommy	3–0	Loa Mabel Chris
Anolyn Lulu	2–1	Idau Boni Chris
–

4 December 2017; 11:00	Report	Tuvalu	0–5	Fiji
Score by game:
Sulami Resture	0–3	Grace Yee
Betty Resture	0–3	Sally Yee
–	0–3	Xuan Li
Sulami Resture	0–3	Sally Yee
Betty Resture	0–3	Grace Yee
–

5 December 2017; 09:00	Report	Papua New Guinea	1–4	New Caledonia
Score by game:
Idau Boni Chris	0–3	Lorie La
Loa Mabel Chris	0–3	Anais Paul
–	0–3	Jade Pabouty
Idau Boni Chris	3–2	Anais Paul
Loa Mabel Chris	0–3	Lorie La
–

5 December 2017; 09:00	Report	Vanuatu	5–0	Tuvalu
Score by game:
Liopa Santhy	3–0	Betty Resture
Stephanie Qwea	3–0	Sulami Resture
Priscila Tommy	3–0	–
Liopa Santhy	3–0	Sulami Resture
Stephanie Qwea	3–0	Betty Resture
–

5 December 2017; 09:00	Report	Fiji	5–0	Solomon Islands
Score by game:
Grace Yee	3–0	Connie Sifi
Xuan Li	3–1	Lalmah Sifi
Sally Yee	3–0	–
Grace Yee	3–1	Lalmah Sifi
Xuan Li	3–0	Connie Sifi
–

5 December 2017; 13:00	Report	Fiji	1–4	New Caledonia
Score by game:
Xuan Li	1–3	Ornella Bouteille
Grace Yee	1–3	Lorie La
Sally Yee	3–0	Anais Paul
Xuan Li	0–3	Lorie La
Grace Yee	0–3	Ornella Bouteille
–

5 December 2017; 13:00	Report	Vanuatu	W–O	Solomon Islands

5 December 2017; 13:00	Report	Papua New Guinea	4–0	Tuvalu
Score by game:
Loa Mabel Chris	3–1	Sulami Resture
Idau Boni Chris	3–1	Betty Resture
–	–––	–
Loa Mabel Chris	3–0	Betty Resture
Idau Boni Chris	3–1	Sulami Resture
–

== See also ==
- Table tennis at the Pacific Games
