= Waisea Turaga =

Personal information
- Nationality: Fijian

Sport
- Sport: Lawn bowls
Medal record
Representing Fiji
Asia Pacific Bowls Championships
Bronze medal – third place	2015 Christchurch	triples

Waisea Turaga is a Fijian international male lawn bowler.

== Biography ==
Turaga won a triples bronze medal (with Arun Kumar and David Aitcheson) at the 2015 Asia Pacific Bowls Championships in New Zealand.
