= Laisani Waqa =

Fijian netball player (born 2002)

Personal information
- Born: 1 January 2002 (age 24) Nausori, Fiji
- Occupation: netball player
- Height: 1.89 m (6 ft 2 in)

Netball career
- Playing positions: goal attack, goal shooter

Laisani Waqa (born 1 January 2002) is a Fijian netball player who plays for Fiji in the positions of goal attack or goal shooter. She was included in the Fijian squad for the 2019 Netball World Cup which was also her maiden appearance at a Netball World Cup.

She also represented Fiji at the 2018 Commonwealth Games, her maiden appearance at a Commonwealth Games event.
