= Waisale Waqanivalu =

Fijian serial killer (born 1979)

Waisale Waqnivalu
- Born: 1979 (age 46–47); Naisisili, Nacula, Ba, Fiji
- Years active: 2003
- Children: 1
- Convictions: Murder (x5); Attempted murder Robbery with violence
- Penalty: Life imprisonment

Details
- Country: Fiji
- State: Ba
- Target: Couples
- Killed: 5
- Injured: 1

Waisale Waqanivalu (born 1979) is a Fijian serial killer and mass murderer who murdered five people and injured another in Ba, Fiji, between March and December 2003. He first attacked a couple near a plantation with a rock, killing the woman and injuring the man. In December, he killed four more people at a cane field and drinking spot. He was caught soon after, and received five concurrent life terms plus 10 years. He is often regarded as the country's first serial killer.

== Murders ==
On 6 March 2003, Waqanivalu noticed a carrier parked near a cassava plantation in Nasoso, Nadi. As he crossed the plantation, he saw 35-year-old Sarita Devi and her boyfriend, Mohammed Iliaz, who were allegedly engaging in sexual intercourse. Waqanivalu then picked up a rock and knocked Iliaz unconscious. Immediately afterwards, he repeatedly struck Devi in the head, killing her.

Nine months later, on 8 December, Waqanivalu noticed a minibus parked near a cane field in Wavuwavu, a popular drinking spot. Armed with an iron bar, he approached the vehicle and fatally bludgeoned its occupants, 26-year-old Vonivate Kubu and Kubu's girlfriend, 26-year-old Saraseini Batiratu. He then bludgeoned 21-year-old Adrian Jotish Lal and 20-year-old Eleni McGoon, who were about 100 metres away.

== Legal proceedings ==
Waqanivalu was arrested in the same month as his final four murders and was quickly connected to Devi's murder as well. He initially pleaded not guilty, but changed his plea to avoid spending the rest of his life in prison. He was sentenced to five concurrent life terms in prison. Under Fijian law, a life sentence is usually equal to 10 years. He had already been found guilty of robbery with violence and sentenced to 10 additional years in prison. In total, he was sentenced to 29 years' imprisonment by the High Court, 19 for the murders, and 10 for robbery with violence.

The father of victim Vonivate Kubu said that justice had been served after hearing the verdict, but was concerned about what the Waqanivalu's wife, Miriama Adibocua, and six-year-old daughter would do to survive, stating: "The wife and child did not know what happened so I am really concerned about what they would do for the 29 years that Waisale would be in prison." Adibocua also expressed concern over her husband's sentence, but said she would rely on the "strength of God" to support her and her daughter. Since confessing to the murders, Waqanivalu was said to have changed a lot for the sake of his daughter, who he is close with.

== See also ==
- List of serial killers by country
- Violence against women in Fiji
