= Laisana Moceisawana =

- Born: 28 June 1998 (age 28)
- Height: 1.76 m (5 ft 9 in)
- Weight: 71 kg (157 lb)

Rugby union career
National sevens team
Years	Team	Comps
- Fiji
Medal record
Representing Fiji
Women's rugby sevens
Commonwealth Games
Silver medal – second place	2022 Birmingham	Team competition

Laisani Moceisawana (born 28 June 1998) is a Fijian rugby sevens player.

Moceisawana was named in the Fijiana sevens team for the 2022 Commonwealth Games in Birmingham. Her side won the silver medal.
