= 1978 Commonwealth Games =

Multi-sport event in Edmonton, Canada

XI Commonwealth Games
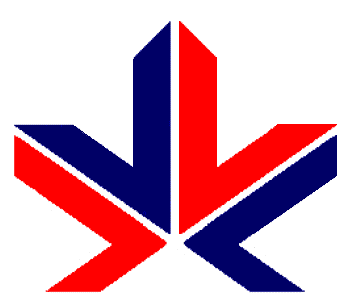
- Host city: Edmonton, Canada
- Nations: 47
- Athletes: 1,475
- Events: 128 events in 11 sports
- Opening: 3 August 1978
- Closing: 12 August 1978
- Opened by: Elizabeth II
- Athlete's Oath: Beverly Boys
- Queen's Baton Final Runner: Diane Jones Konihowski
- Main venue: Commonwealth Stadium

The 1978 Commonwealth Games were held in Edmonton, Alberta, Canada, from 3 to 12 August, two years after the 1976 Summer Olympics was held in Montreal, Quebec. They were boycotted by Nigeria, in protest at New Zealand's sporting contacts with apartheid-era South Africa, as well as by Uganda, in protest at alleged Canadian hostility towards the government of Idi Amin. The Bid Election was held at the 1972 Summer Olympics in Munich.

This was the first Commonwealth Games where a computerized system was used to handle ticket sales. This was the first Commonwealth Games to be named under the current title as Commonwealth Games, having dropped British. The Games were opened by Queen Elizabeth II for the first time since becoming Queen in 1952.

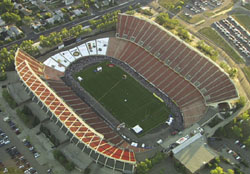
The Commonwealth Stadium

== Host selection ==
1978 Commonwealth Games bidding results
City	Round 1
(Canada) Edmonton	36
(England) Leeds	10

== Venues ==
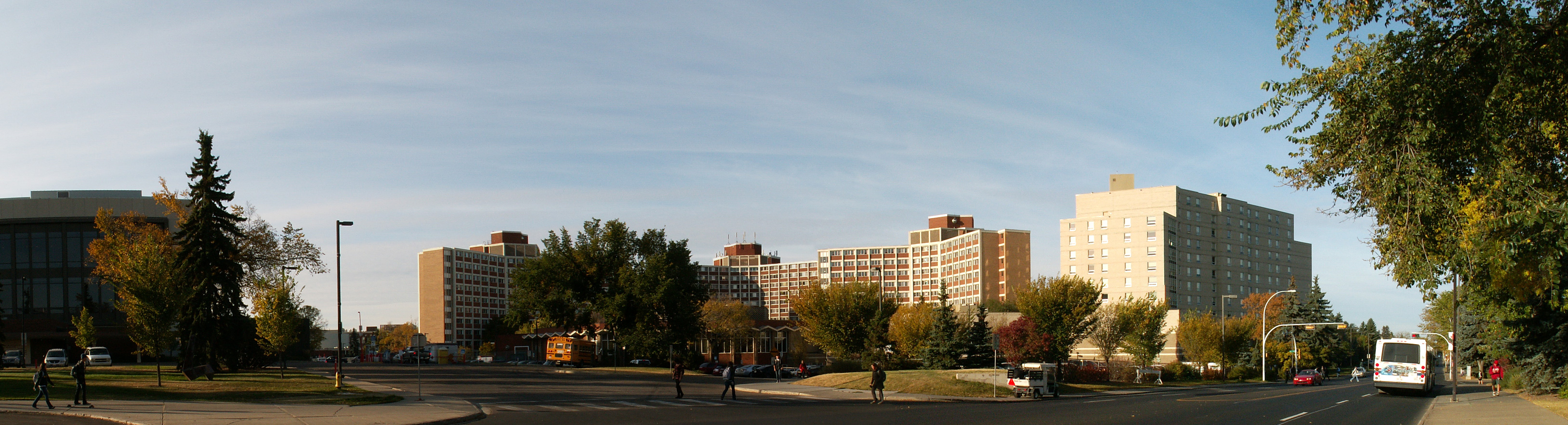
Lister Hall in the University of Alberta accommodated the athletes

The main stadium was the Commonwealth Stadium, constructed specifically for the Games at the cost of $42 million.

The athletes' village was located at the University of Alberta and had accommodation for 2,000 athletes (2 per room) in the Lister Hall Residential Complex. The dining hall could seat up to 1,000 and was open 24 hours a day. A shuttle bus ran from the University campus to the main stadium five miles away.

- Aquatics (diving and swimming) - Kinsmen Aquatic Centre
- Athletics - Commonwealth Stadium
- Badminton - University of Alberta Arena
- Boxing - Edmonton Gardens
- Cycling (track) - Argyll Velodrome
- Cycling (road) - North Saskatchewan River Valley.
- Gymnastics - Northlands Coliseum
- Lacrosse (demonstration event) - Edmonton Coliseum
- Lawn bowls - Coronation Park Greens
- Shooting - Strathcona Shooting Range
- Weightlifting - Northern Alberta Jubilee Auditorium
- Wrestling - University of Alberta main varsity gymnasium

== Participating teams ==
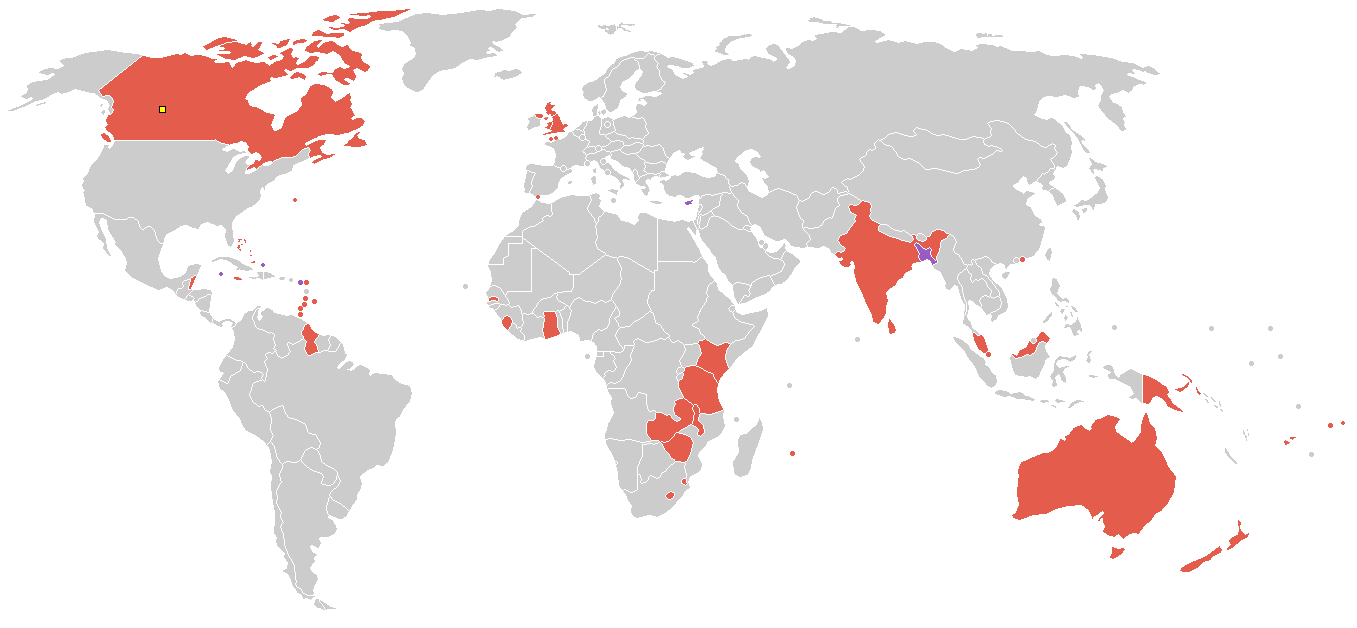
Participating countries

46 teams were represented at the 1978 Games.
(Teams competing for the first time are shown in bold).

Participating Commonwealth countries and territories
- Antigua
- Australia
- Bahamas
- **Bangladesh**
- Barbados
- Bermuda
- British Honduras
- Canada **(host)**
- **Cayman Islands**
- Cook Islands
- **Cyprus**
- England
- Fiji (7)
- Ghana
- Gibraltar
- Grenada
- Guernsey
- Guyana
- Hong Kong
- India
- Isle of Man
- Jamaica
- Jersey
- Kenya
- Lesotho
- Malawi
- Malaysia
- Mauritius
- New Zealand
- Northern Ireland
- Papua New Guinea
- **Saint Christopher-Nevis-Anguilla**
- Saint Lucia
- Saint Vincent and the Grenadines
- Scotland
- Sierra Leone
- Singapore
- Sri Lanka
- Swaziland
- Tanzania
- The Gambia
- Trinidad and Tobago
- **Turks and Caicos Islands**
- Wales
- Western Samoa
- Zambia

== Medal table ==
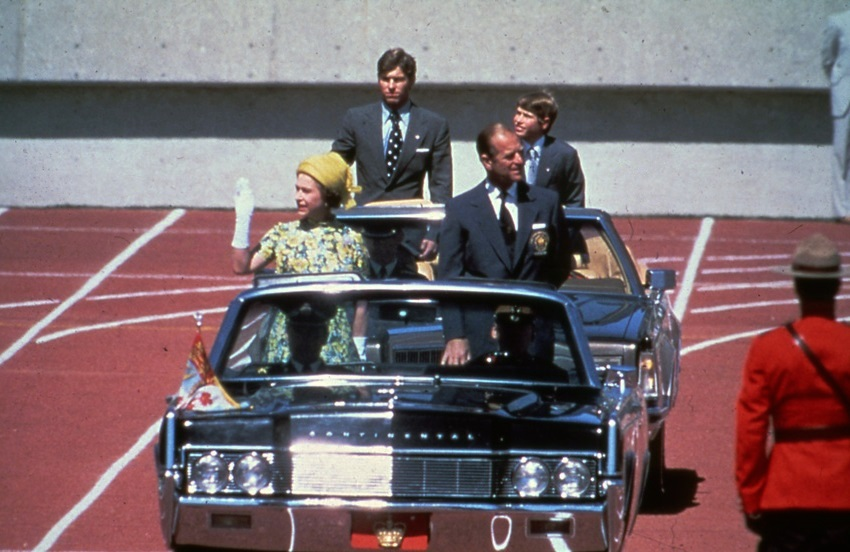
Queen Elizabeth II, Prince Philip, and their two younger sons, Andrew and Edward, at the opening of the 1978 Commonwealth Games, in Edmonton, Alberta

.

The host nation topped the medal table.

* Host nation (Canada)

Rank	Nation	Gold	Silver	Bronze	Total
1	Canada*	45	31	33	109
2	England	27	28	32	87
3	Australia	24	33	27	84
4	Kenya	7	6	5	18
5	New Zealand	5	6	9	20
6	India	5	4	6	15
7	Scotland	3	6	5	14
8	Jamaica	2	2	3	7
9	Wales	2	1	5	8
10	Northern Ireland	2	1	2	5
11	Hong Kong	2	0	0	2
12	Malaysia	1	2	1	4
13	Ghana	1	1	1	3
13	Guyana	1	1	1	3
15	Tanzania	1	1	0	2
16	Trinidad and Tobago	0	2	2	4
16	Zambia	0	2	2	4
18	Bahamas	0	1	0	1
18	Papua New Guinea	0	1	0	1
20	Western Samoa	0	0	3	3
21	Isle of Man	0	0	1	1
Totals (21 entries)		**128**	**129**	**138**	**395**

== Sports ==
- Aquatics
  - Diving ()
  - Swimming ()
- Athletics ()
- Badminton ()
- Boxing ()
- Cycling ()
- Gymnastics ()
- Lawn bowls ()
- Shooting ()
- Weightlifting ()
- Wrestling ()

Preceded by **Christchurch**	**Commonwealth Games**; Edmonton; **XI Commonwealth Games**	Succeeded by **Brisbane**
