= Tevita Daugunu =

- Born: 12 November 1992 (age 34)

Rugby union career
National sevens team
Years	Team	Comps
- Fiji
Medal record
Men's rugby sevens
Representing Fiji
Commonwealth Games
Silver medal – second place	2022 Birmingham	Team

Tevita Daugunu (born 12 November 1992) is a Fijian rugby sevens player. He was part of the Fiji sevens team that won a silver medal at the 2022 Commonwealth Games.
