= Arun Kumar (bowls) =

Fijian lawn bowler

Personal information
- Nationality: Fiji
- Born: 10 January 1961 (age 65) Nadi, Fiji

Sport
- Sport: Lawn bowls
Medal record
Representing Fiji
Asia Pacific Bowls Championships
Bronze medal – third place	2007 Christchurch	pairs
Bronze medal – third place	2015 Christchurch	triples

Arun Kumar (born 1961) is a Fijian international male lawn bowler.

== Biography ==
=== Commonwealth Games ===
Kumar has represented Fiji at both the 2014 Commonwealth Games and the 2018 Commonwealth Games.

=== World Championships ===
Kumar has competed in three World Championships Championships and in 2020 he was selected for his fourth, at the 2020 World Outdoor Bowls Championship in Australia.

=== Asia Pacific Championships ===
Kumar won a pairs bronze medal with Ratish Lal at the 2007 Asia Pacific Bowls Championships in New Zealand and another bronze with David Aitcheson and Waisea Turaga at the 2015 Asia Pacific Bowls Championships in New Zealand.
