= Vicky Wu =

Fijian table tennis player (born 2005)

Personal information
- Nationality: Fiji
- Born: April 8, 2005 (age 21)

Sport
- Sport: Table tennis
- Playing style: Right-handed shakehand
Medal record
Table Tennis
Representing Fiji
All Games
Bronze medal – third place	2017 Pacific Mini Games	Mix
Bronze medal – third place	2019 Pacific Games	Mix

Vicky Wu (born 8 April 2005) is a Fijian table tennis player. He competed in the men's table tennis event at the 2024 Summer Olympics in Paris, becoming the first male Fijian to represent the country in the sport. Wu was the youngest Fijian athlete at the 2018 Commonwealth Games. He also won bronze medals at the 2017 Pacific Mini Games and the 2019 Pacific Games.

Wu is a graduate of the Yat Sen Secondary School in Suva, and studies and trains at Monash University in Melbourne, Australia.
