= Radhika Prasad =

Fijian international female lawn bowler (born 1955)

Personal information
- Nationality: Fijian
- Born: 6 September 1955 (age 70)

Sport
- Sport: Lawn bowls
Medal record
Women's lawn bowls
Representing Fiji
World Outdoor Championships
Bronze medal – third place	1996 Leamington Spa	Women's Pairs
Asia Pacific Bowls Championships
Silver medal – second place	1991 Kowloon	pairs
Gold medal – first place	1991 Kowloon	fours
Bronze medal – third place	2001 Melbourne	fours
Silver medal – second place	2003 Brisbane	pairs
Bronze medal – third place	2003 Brisbane	fours

Radhika Usha Kiran Prasad MOF is a Fijian international female lawn bowler.

== Bowls career ==
Prasad won a pairs bronze medal with Litia Tikoisuva at the 1996 World Outdoor Bowls Championship in Victoria Park in Royal Leamington Spa, England.

She has won five medals at the Asia Pacific Bowls Championships including a gold medal in the 1991 fours, in Kowloon, Hong Kong.

In 2022, she competed in the women's triples and the Women's fours at the 2022 Commonwealth Games.

In 2023, she was selected as part of the team to represent Fiji at the 2023 World Outdoor Bowls Championship. She participated in the women's triples and the women's fours events.
