= Josua Vakurunabili =

Fijian rugby union player (born 1992)

- Full name: Ratu Josua Vakurunabili
- Born: 10 June 1992 (age 34)
- Height: 1.89 m (6 ft 2 in)
- Weight: 96 kg (212 lb)

Rugby union career
National sevens team
Years	Team	Comps
2017 -	Fiji	
Medal record
Men's rugby sevens
Representing Fiji
Olympic Games
Gold medal – first place	2020 Tokyo	Team competition
Rugby Sevens World Cup
Gold medal – first place	2022 Cape Town	Team competition
Commonwealth Games
Silver medal – second place	2022 Birmingham	Team competition
Silver medal – second place	2018 Gold Coast	Team competition

Ratu Josua Vakurunabili (born 10 June 1992) is a Fijian rugby union player.

== Biography ==
Vakurunabili is from Vatukarasa Village in the Nadroga Navosa Province. He made his senior international debut at the London Sevens in 2017. He was named in the Dream Team at the 2019 Singapore Sevens tournament. He was named in the winning Fiji squad for the Rugby sevens at the 2020 Summer Olympics.

Vakurunabili was part of the Fiji sevens team that won a silver medal at the 2022 Commonwealth Games. A month later, he won a gold medal at the 2022 Rugby World Cup Sevens in Cape Town.
