= David Aitcheson =

Fijian lawn bowler

Personal information
- Born: 15 October 1964 (age 61) Labasa, Colony of Fiji, British Empire

Sport
- Sport: Lawn bowls
Medal record
Representing Fiji
Asia Pacific Bowls Championships
Bronze medal – third place	2015 Christchurch	triples

David Robert Aitcheson (born 1964) is a Fijian international male lawn bowler.

== Biography ==
=== Commonwealth Games ===
Aitcheson represented Fiji at the 2018 Commonwealth Games. In 2022, he competed in the men's triples and the men's fours at the 2022 Commonwealth Games.

=== World Championships ===
In 2020 he was selected for the 2020 World Outdoor Bowls Championship in Australia.

=== Asia Pacific Championships ===
He won a triples bronze medal with Arun Kumar and Waisea Turaga at the 2015 Asia Pacific Bowls Championships in New Zealand.
