= Fiji at the 1982 Commonwealth Games =

Sporting event delegation

Flag of Fiji

Fiji competed for the tenth time at the 1982 Commonwealth Games in Brisbane, Australia. Fiji athletes competed in athletics, badminton, boxing, cycling, lawn bowls and swimming.

The country won its second ever Commonwealth gold medal - its first since 1950. Fine Sani, boxing in the men's light heavyweight division, was Fiji's only medal winner at the 1982 Games, defeating Jonathan Kirisa of Uganda.

== Medals ==
	(gold)	(silver)	(bronze)	Total
Fiji	1	0	0	1

=== Gold ===
==== Boxing ====
- Men's light heavyweight: Fine Sani

== Sources ==
- Fiji results for the 1982 Games, Commonwealth Games Federation
