= Fiji at the 1954 British Empire and Commonwealth Games =

Sporting event delegation

Flag of Fiji from 1924 to 1970

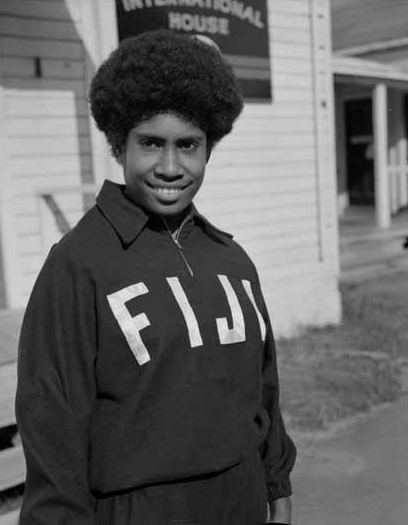
Long jumper Sainiana Sorwale at the Games. Attribution:Province newspaper

Fiji's participation in the 1954 British Empire and Commonwealth Games in Vancouver, British Columbia, Canada marked the colony's third appearance at the Games. It was the first time Fiji had participated in an edition of the Commonwealth Games held outside Oceania.

Fiji athletes competed only in athletics. The country took part in five male events, and, for the first time, sent a female athlete to the Games. Sainiana Sorowale, the first ever woman to represent Fiji at the Commonwealth Games, competed in the long jump.

Fiji won no medals - a sharp decline from the five medals it had won in 1950.

== Medals ==
	(gold)	(silver)	(bronze)	Total
Fiji	0	0	0	0

== Sources ==
- Fiji results for the 1954 Games, Commonwealth Games Federation
