= Fiji at the 1958 British Empire and Commonwealth Games =

Sporting event delegation

Flag of Fiji from 1924 to 1970

Fiji's participation in the 1958 British Empire and Commonwealth Games in Cardiff, Wales marked the colony's fourth appearance at the Games.

Fiji athletes competed only in athletics. The country sent three athletes to compete in four events. Mesulame Rakuro, in the men's discus throw, finished 5th out of 15 with a throw of 48.01m. Joseph "Joe" Tokana finished joint 20th (out of 27) in the men's high jump, with a jump of 1.85m, and 17th (out of 21) in the men's triple jump, with a jump of 14.07m. Viliame Bale Liga finished 5th out of 15 in the men's javelin, with a throw of 66.9m. The delegation contained no female athletes.

For the third time (and the second time running), Fiji won no medals.

== Medals ==
| | (gold) | (silver) | (bronze) | Total |
|---|---|---|---|---|
| Fiji | 0 | 0 | 0 | 0 |

== Sources ==
- Fiji results for the 1958 Games, Commonwealth Games Federation
