= Fiji at the 1974 British Commonwealth Games =

Sporting event delegation

Flag of Fiji

Fiji competed for the eighth time at the 1974 British Commonwealth Games in Christchurch, New Zealand. A team of thirty-six athletes (27 men and 9 women) and ten officials (9 men and 1 woman) was sent to the 1974 Games.

Fijian competitors competed in athletics (10 men & 5 women), boxing (8 men), lawn bowls (7 men), swimming (1 man & 4 women), and weightlifting (1 man). No medals were won.

Two swimmers representing Fiji were from New Zealand, sisters Jane and Rebecca Perrott; their father was Registrar at the University of the South Pacific. At 12½ Rebecca was the youngest competitor at the games. Lasarusa Waqa also represented Fiji in the 100 and 400 mtrs.

== Medals ==
	(gold)	(silver)	(bronze)	Total
Fiji	0	0	0	0

== Sources ==
- Fiji results for the 1974 Games, Commonwealth Games Federation
