= Fiji at the 2006 Commonwealth Games =

Sporting event delegation

Flag of Fiji

The Official Logo of the Fiji Commonwealth Games Association

Fiji was represented at the 2006 Commonwealth Games in Melbourne. They would win one bronze medal in Rugby 7s, the only medal they would win in 2006.

== Medals ==
	(gold)	(silver)	(bronze)	Total
Fiji	0	0	1	1

=== Bronze ===
- Rugby 7s

== Netball ==
Fiji finished 9th in the netball at the 2006 Commonwealth Games. In the 9th/10th playoff, they defeated Barbados 69–45.

Pool 1

Saturday 18 March; 13:00 (UTC+11)	Report; Stats	England	60–41	Fiji	Umpires: Chris Campbell; Bronwyn Meek; Reserve umpire: Christine Robinson
Saturday 18 March; 13:00 (UTC+11)	Report; Stats	Scoring by quarter: 18-9, 15-9, 10-14, 17-9			Umpires: Chris Campbell; Bronwyn Meek; Reserve umpire: Christine Robinson
Saturday 18 March; 13:00 (UTC+11)	Report; Stats	Rachel Dunn 30/36 (83%); Pamela Cookey 24/35 (69%); Abby Teare 6/9 (67%)		Matelita Shaw 24/30 (80%); Taraima Rara 17/23 (74%)	Umpires: Chris Campbell; Bronwyn Meek; Reserve umpire: Christine Robinson

Sunday 19 March; 18:30 (UTC+11)	Report; Stats	New Zealand	80–26	Fiji	Umpires: Marion Johnson-Hurley; Michelle Phippard; Reserve umpire: Anne Abraitis
Sunday 19 March; 18:30 (UTC+11)	Report; Stats	Scoring by quarter: 17-7, 24-4, 17-8, 22-7			Umpires: Marion Johnson-Hurley; Michelle Phippard; Reserve umpire: Anne Abraitis
Sunday 19 March; 18:30 (UTC+11)	Report; Stats	Irene van Dyk 32/35 (91%); Maria Tutaia 32/38 (84%); Jessica Tuki 9/13 (69%); Belinda Colling 7/8 (88%)		Taraima Rara 10/15 (67%); Matelita Shaw 9/12 (75%); Laniana Tuisasa 6/8 (75%); Maria Bereso 1/4 (25%)	Umpires: Marion Johnson-Hurley; Michelle Phippard; Reserve umpire: Anne Abraitis

Monday 20 March; 13:00 (UTC+11)	Stats	Fiji	52–53	Malawi	Umpires: Jackie Jashari; Bobbi Brown; Reserve umpire: Sharon Kelly
Monday 20 March; 13:00 (UTC+11)	Stats	Scoring by quarter: 12-13, 15-12, 14-16, 11-12			Umpires: Jackie Jashari; Bobbi Brown; Reserve umpire: Sharon Kelly
Monday 20 March; 13:00 (UTC+11)	Stats	Taraima Rara 28/35 (80%); Matelita Shaw 24/27 (89%)		Linda Magombo 33/35 (94%); Mary Waya 20/24 (83%)	Umpires: Jackie Jashari; Bobbi Brown; Reserve umpire: Sharon Kelly

Wednesday 22 March; 15:00 (UTC+11)	Stats	South Africa	56–51	Fiji	Umpires: Michelle Phippard; Marion Johnson-Hurley; Reserve umpire: Anne Abraitis
Wednesday 22 March; 15:00 (UTC+11)	Stats	Scoring by quarter: 14-7, 15-14, 12-12, 15-18			Umpires: Michelle Phippard; Marion Johnson-Hurley; Reserve umpire: Anne Abraitis
Wednesday 22 March; 15:00 (UTC+11)	Stats	Sindisiwe Gumede 40/46 (87%); Lizanne Helmand 10/13 (77%); Christine Markgraaff 6/6 (100%)		Matelita Shaw 29/35 (83%); Taraima Rara 20/23 (87%); Maria Bereso 2/4 (50%)	Umpires: Michelle Phippard; Marion Johnson-Hurley; Reserve umpire: Anne Abraitis

Thursday 23 March; 11:00 (UTC+11)	Stats	Fiji	58–44	Saint Vincent and the Grenadines	Umpires: Bobbi Brown; Stacey Campton; Reserve umpire: Pauline Sciascia
Thursday 23 March; 11:00 (UTC+11)	Stats	Scoring by quarter: 13-10, 15-12, 16-11, 14-11			Umpires: Bobbi Brown; Stacey Campton; Reserve umpire: Pauline Sciascia
Thursday 23 March; 11:00 (UTC+11)	Stats	Matelita Shaw 32/38 (84%); Laniana Tuisasa 26/28 (93%)		Galeine Gordon 26/33 (79%); Samathea Christopher 15/16 (94%); Nicole Sandy 3/5 (60%)	Umpires: Bobbi Brown; Stacey Campton; Reserve umpire: Pauline Sciascia

Table

Pos	Team	P	W	D	L	GF	GA	GD	Pts
1	New Zealand	5	5	0	0	374	173	+201	10
2	England	5	4	0	1	308	196	+112	8
3	Malawi	5	3	0	2	262	282	-20	6
4	South Africa	5	2	0	3	264	283	-19	4
5	Fiji	5	1	0	4	228	293	-65	2
6	Saint Vincent and the Grenadines	5	0	0	5	171	380	-209	0

Qualified for Semi-finals
Qualified for Classification

9th/10th playoff

Friday 24 March; 18:30 (UTC+11)	Report; Stats	Fiji	69–45	Barbados	Umpires: Amanda Nottingham; Jacqui Jashari; Reserve umpire: Bill Alexander
Friday 24 March; 18:30 (UTC+11)	Report; Stats	Scoring by quarter: 17-10, 17-6, 18-15, 17-14			Umpires: Amanda Nottingham; Jacqui Jashari; Reserve umpire: Bill Alexander
Friday 24 March; 18:30 (UTC+11)	Report; Stats	Taraima Rara 50/55 (91%); Matelita Shaw 19/24 (79%)		Lydia Bishop 24/31 (77%); Wanda Agard-Belgrave 16/20 (80%); Laurel Browne 4/5 (80%); Denise Alleyne 1/1 (100%)	Umpires: Amanda Nottingham; Jacqui Jashari; Reserve umpire: Bill Alexander

Squad

Fiji roster
Players
Coaches

Name	Pos	DOB	Height	Club	Nat	Caps
Maria Bereso	GS, GA	15 August 1983 (aged 22)	1.80 m (5 ft 11 in)	CBM Suva
Ana Erenavula	WA	20 January 1985 (aged 21)	1.70 m (5 ft 7 in)	Wailulu - Nadi
Venina Galuinadi	WD	25 May 1976 (aged 29)	1.76 m (5 ft 9 in)	Taileru - Suva
Mere Rambuka	GK, GD	28 May 1982 (aged 23)	1.82 m (6 ft 0 in)	Credit Corp - Lautoka
Taraima Rara	GS, GA	19 August 1982 (aged 23)	1.86 m (6 ft 1 in)	Grasshoppers (Nasinu)
Anasimeci Ratumaisala	GD, GK	14 April 1975 (aged 30)	1.74 m (5 ft 9 in)	Lomaiviti - Suva
Unaisi Rokoura (cc)	C, WA	7 December 1977 (aged 28)	1.63 m (5 ft 4 in)	CBM Suva
Matelita Shaw	GS, GA	16 October 1979 (aged 26)	1.79 m (5 ft 10 in)	Excelsior - Nasinu
Hannah Tuikoro	C, WA	8 March 1985 (aged 21)	1.79 m (5 ft 10 in)	Tailevu - Suva
Laniana Tuisasa	GS, GA	6 July 1987 (aged 18)	1.79 m (5 ft 10 in)	Nasinu
Mere Tuwai	GD, GK	22 December 1985 (aged 20)	1.82 m (6 ft 0 in)	CBM Suva
Matila Waqanidrola (cc)	GD, GK	31 March 1981 (aged 24)	1.82 m (6 ft 0 in)	Excelsior - Nasinu

Head coach

- Megan Simpson

Assistant coach

- Katarina Toga Ruru

Manager: Asenaca Waqanivavalagi

Notes

- (c) – Captain
- (cc) – Co-captain
- (vc) – Vice-captain
- – Injury / maternity leave
- (TRP) – Temporary Replacement Player
